= 2002–03 Terceira Divisão =

Terceira Divisão
- Season: 2002–03

The 2002–03 Terceira Divisão season was the 56th season of the competition and the 13th season of recognised fourth-tier football in Portugal.

== Overview ==
The league was contested by 117 teams in 7 divisions of 10 to 18 teams.

== Terceira Divisão – Série A ==
Pos	Team	Pld	W	D	L	GF	GA	GD	Pts	Promotion or relegation
1	GD Bragança	34	21	8	5	66	26	+40	71	Promotion to Segunda Divisão
2	CDA Valdevez	34	20	8	6	56	30	+26	68	Promotion to Segunda Divisão
3	GD Joane	34	17	9	8	53	38	+15	60	
4	Os Sandinenses	34	16	8	10	47	33	+14	56	
5	Vilaverdense FC	34	15	9	10	51	35	+16	54	
6	SC Maria da Fonte	34	12	13	9	45	41	+4	49	
7	SC Valenciano	34	13	10	11	31	29	+2	49	
8	SC Mirandela	34	13	7	14	51	52	−1	46	
9	CD Monção	34	11	12	11	45	46	−1	45	
10	Juventude Ronfe	34	13	5	16	48	63	−15	44	
11	ADC Montalegre	34	11	10	13	40	44	−4	43	
12	FC Amares	34	10	12	12	34	40	−6	42	
13	AD Valpaços	34	11	8	15	57	51	+6	41	
14	CD Cerveira	34	11	5	18	45	58	−13	38	
15	FC Marinhas	34	10	7	17	41	66	−25	37	Relegation to Distritais
16	GD Terras de Bouro	34	9	8	17	34	50	−16	35	Relegation to Distritais
17	Águias Graça	34	7	11	16	26	49	−23	32	Relegation to Distritais
18	SC Vila Pouca de Aguiar	34	7	8	19	37	56	−19	29	Relegation to Distritais

== Terceira Divisão – Série B ==
Pos	Team	Pld	W	D	L	GF	GA	GD	Pts	Promotion or relegation
1	Lixa FC	34	22	7	5	68	25	+43	73	Promotion to Segunda Divisão
2	CD Trofense	34	20	10	4	58	32	+26	70	Promotion to Segunda Divisão
3	FC Tirsense	34	16	14	4	57	36	+21	62	
4	AD Oliveirense	34	17	9	8	49	41	+8	60	
5	Fiães SC	34	16	8	10	54	39	+15	56	
6	FC Famalicão	34	13	12	9	43	33	+10	51	
7	Pedrouços AC	34	13	10	11	53	44	+9	49	
8	GD Torre de Moncorvo	34	13	9	12	51	45	+6	48	
9	AD São Pedro da Cova	34	13	9	12	49	47	+2	48	
10	GD Ribeirão	34	14	4	16	36	36	0	46	
11	Rebordosa AC	34	12	10	12	47	47	0	46	
12	SC Rio Tinto	34	11	12	11	57	44	+13	45	
13	Lusitânia Lourosa	34	13	5	16	51	49	+2	44	
14	CD Cinfães	34	10	11	13	41	45	−4	41	
15	SC Lamego	34	11	8	15	37	48	−11	41	Relegation to Distritais
16	GD Serzedelo	34	9	6	19	42	65	−23	33	Relegation to Distritais
17	GD Pevidém	34	2	8	24	28	86	−58	14	Relegation to Distritais
18	SC Cambres	34	2	6	26	30	89	−59	12	Relegation to Distritais

== Terceira Divisão – Série C ==
Pos	Team	Pld	W	D	L	GF	GA	GD	Pts	Promotion or relegation
1	CD Estarreja	34	19	5	10	62	37	+25	62	Promotion to Segunda Divisão
2	FC Pampilhosa	34	16	12	6	57	30	+27	60	Promotion to Segunda Divisão
3	GD Milheiroense	34	16	11	7	50	32	+18	59	
4	AD Valecambrense	34	17	7	10	54	48	+6	58	
5	FC Cesarense	34	16	9	9	46	37	+9	57	
6	GD Gafanha	34	14	8	12	47	42	+5	50	
7	AD Sátão	34	14	7	13	57	50	+7	49	
8	SC Penalva do Castelo	34	14	7	13	38	41	−3	49	
9	UD Tocha	34	13	7	14	54	46	+8	46	
10	União Coimbra	34	12	9	13	47	51	−4	45	
11	AD Fornos de Algodres	34	12	9	13	43	49	−6	45	
12	GD Mangualde	34	11	10	13	50	55	−5	43	
13	CD Arrifanense	34	10	13	11	35	37	−2	43	
14	Anadia FC	34	11	8	15	46	49	−3	41	
15	AA Avanca	34	11	7	16	54	58	−4	40	Relegation to Distritais
16	AD Estação	34	9	9	16	25	49	−24	36	Relegation to Distritais
17	Miléu SC	34	9	5	20	27	46	−19	32	Relegation to Distritais
18	CD Gouveia	34	7	7	20	28	63	−35	28	Relegation to Distritais

== Terceira Divisão – Série D ==
Pos	Team	Pld	W	D	L	GF	GA	GD	Pts	Promotion or relegation
1	CD Alcains	32	19	8	5	68	32	+36	65	Promotion to Segunda Divisão
2	AD Portomosense	32	17	11	4	66	32	+34	45	Promotion to Segunda Divisão
3	SC Lourinhanense	32	19	4	9	63	30	+33	61	
4	AD Fazendense	32	15	8	9	46	35	+11	53	
5	Beneditense CD	32	15	8	9	49	38	+11	53	
6	GD Sourense	32	14	10	8	50	34	+16	52	
7	UD Rio Maior	32	15	7	10	52	39	+13	52	
8	CA Riachense	32	12	14	6	60	48	+12	50	
9	GDR Bidoeirense	32	11	9	12	37	39	−2	42	
10	UDR Caranguejeira	32	11	8	13	38	48	−10	41	
11	CD Torres Novas	32	10	8	14	35	41	−6	38	
12	GD Peniche	32	9	10	13	37	50	−13	37	
13	União Mirense	32	8	12	12	35	43	−8	36	
14	União Almeirim	32	9	8	15	33	46	−13	35	
15	CA Mirandense	32	7	9	16	30	58	−28	30	Relegation to Distritais
16	Vitória Sernache	32	3	9	20	29	72	−43	18	Relegation to Distritais
17	Os Nazarenos	32	2	9	21	34	77	−43	15	Relegation to Distritais

== Terceira Divisão – Série E ==
Pos	Team	Pld	W	D	L	GF	GA	GD	Pts	Promotion or relegation
1	SU Sintrense	34	17	11	6	45	24	+21	62	Promotion to Segunda Divisão
2	CD Ribeira Brava	34	17	8	9	49	35	+14	59	Promotion to Segunda Divisão
3	S.L. Benfica B	34	14	14	6	47	25	+22	56	
4	AC Malveira	34	15	9	10	45	46	−1	54	
5	GS Loures	34	15	9	10	48	36	+12	54	
6	CD Portosantense	34	15	8	11	58	49	+9	53	
7	GD Alcochetense	34	14	9	11	49	40	+9	51	
8	O Elvas CAD	34	14	7	13	59	61	−2	49	
9	AD Carregado	34	14	6	14	43	44	−1	48	
10	1º Maio Sarilhense	34	11	11	12	34	38	−4	44	
11	AD Machico	34	11	11	12	43	34	+9	44	
12	RSC Queluz	34	11	9	14	42	44	−2	42	
13	SG Sacavenense	34	11	9	14	43	53	−10	42	
14	CSD Câmara de Lobos	34	11	8	15	44	44	0	41	
15	CD São Vicente	34	10	9	15	37	43	−6	39	Relegation to Distritais
16	SC Santacruzense	34	10	7	17	34	48	−14	37	Relegation to Distritais
17	Calipolense Vila Viçosa	34	8	12	14	37	49	−12	36	Relegation to Distritais
18	Águias Camarate	34	5	9	20	27	71	−44	24	Relegation to Distritais

== Terceira Divisão – Série F ==
Pos	Team	Pld	W	D	L	GF	GA	GD	Pts	Promotion or relegation
1	CD Pinhalnovense	34	20	8	6	76	33	+43	68	Promotion to Segunda Divisão
2	Estrela Vendas Novas	34	17	12	5	56	22	+34	63	Promotion to Segunda Divisão
3	Atlético CP	34	17	8	9	52	35	+17	59	
4	CD Beja	34	16	10	8	60	31	+29	58	
5	Silves FC	34	16	9	9	53	37	+16	57	
6	Vasco da Gama AC Sines	34	14	13	7	52	33	+19	55	
7	União Santiago	34	12	14	8	44	40	+4	50	
8	UD Messinense	34	14	6	14	53	53	0	48	
9	SR Almancilense	34	13	8	13	37	46	−9	47	
10	Juventude Évora	34	11	13	10	40	37	+3	46	
11	Esperança Lagos	34	12	7	15	53	46	+7	43	
12	GD Sesimbra	34	13	4	17	45	59	−14	43	
13	CD Montijo	34	12	6	16	42	45	−3	42	
14	CDR Quarteirense	34	11	9	14	44	54	−10	42	
15	Lusitano Évora	34	10	9	15	36	46	−10	39	Relegation to Distritais
16	CF Benfica	34	7	16	11	29	42	−13	37	Relegation to Distritais
17	SC Ferreirense	34	7	9	18	31	63	−32	30	Relegation to Distritais
18	Padernense Clube	34	2	3	29	27	108	−81	9	Relegation to Distritais

== Terceira Divisão – Série Açores ==
Série Açores – Preliminary League Table

Pos	Team	Pld	W	D	L	GF	GA	GD	Pts
1	SC Angrense	18	10	5	3	41	16	+25	35
2	Praiense SC	18	10	4	4	42	22	+20	34
3	GD Velense	18	10	3	5	30	17	+13	33
4	CD Santo António	18	9	5	4	41	21	+20	32
5	Santiago FC	18	8	4	6	36	22	+14	28
6	SC Ideal	18	6	6	6	20	22	−2	24
7	Boavista Ribeirinha	18	5	6	7	22	26	−4	21
8	FC Madalena	18	6	3	9	28	34	−6	21
9	FC Flamengos	18	6	3	9	27	34	−7	21
10	Angústias AC	18	0	1	17	6	79	−73	1

Série Açores – Promotion Group

Pos	Team	Pld	W	D	L	GF	GA	GD	BP	Pts	Promotion
1	CD Santo António	8	5	2	1	17	10	+7	32	49	Promotion to Segunda Divisão
2	SC Angrense	8	3	2	3	12	14	−2	35	46	
3	Praiense SC	8	2	5	1	15	8	+7	34	45	
4	Santiago FC	8	2	4	2	13	12	+1	28	38	
5	GD Velense	8	1	1	6	6	19	−13	33	37	

Terceira Divisão - Série Açores Relegation Group

Pos	Team	Pld	W	D	L	GF	GA	GD	BP	Pts	Relegation
1	FC Madalena	7	5	1	1	16	1	+15	21	37	
2	SC Ideal	7	4	1	2	12	6	+6	24	37	
3	Boavista Ribeirinha	7	3	2	2	17	13	+4	21	32	Relegation to Distritais
4	FC Flamengos	7	3	1	3	11	11	0	21	31	Relegation to Distritais
5	Angústias AC	8	0	1	7	4	29	−25	1	2	Relegation to Distritais
