= 2001–02 Terceira Divisão =

Terceira Divisão
- Season: 2001–02

The 2001–02 Terceira Divisão season was the 55th season of the competition and the 12th season of recognised fourth-tier football in Portugal.

== Overview ==
The league was contested by 117 teams in 7 divisions of 10 to 18 teams.

== Terceira Divisão – Série A ==
| Pos | Team | Pld | W | D | L | GF | GA | GD | Pts | Promotion or relegation |
|---|---|---|---|---|---|---|---|---|---|---|
| 1 | SC Vianense | 34 | 18 | 10 | 6 | 53 | 29 | +24 | 64 | Promotion to Segunda Divisão |
| 2 | AD Fafe | 34 | 18 | 9 | 7 | 60 | 30 | +30 | 63 | Promotion to Segunda Divisão |
| 3 | GD Pevidém | 34 | 17 | 9 | 8 | 45 | 29 | +16 | 60 | |
| 4 | GD Terras do Bouro | 34 | 15 | 11 | 8 | 49 | 43 | +6 | 56 | |
| 5 | SC Maria da Fonte | 34 | 16 | 8 | 10 | 52 | 40 | +12 | 56 | |
| 6 | Vilaverdense FC | 34 | 17 | 4 | 13 | 57 | 37 | +20 | 55 | |
| 7 | ADC Montalegre | 34 | 16 | 7 | 11 | 63 | 47 | +16 | 55 | |
| 8 | Juventude Ronfe | 34 | 14 | 7 | 13 | 50 | 50 | 0 | 49 | |
| 9 | SC Valenciano | 34 | 14 | 6 | 14 | 49 | 49 | 0 | 48 | |
| 10 | CD Monção | 34 | 14 | 4 | 16 | 49 | 51 | −2 | 46 | |
| 11 | Águias Graça | 34 | 13 | 6 | 15 | 40 | 46 | −6 | 45 | |
| 12 | AD Valpaços | 34 | 12 | 9 | 13 | 46 | 38 | +8 | 45 | |
| 13 | Valdevez | 34 | 12 | 8 | 14 | 64 | 55 | +9 | 44 | |
| 14 | FC Amares | 34 | 12 | 8 | 14 | 49 | 50 | −1 | 44 | |
| 15 | CA Macedo de Cavaleiros | 34 | 11 | 8 | 15 | 49 | 62 | −13 | 41 | Relegation to Distritais |
| 16 | CF Fão | 34 | 10 | 7 | 17 | 41 | 55 | −14 | 37 | Relegation to Distritais |
| 17 | AD Limianos | 34 | 10 | 5 | 19 | 42 | 68 | −26 | 35 | Relegation to Distritais |
| 18 | Merelinense FC | 34 | 1 | 6 | 27 | 24 | 103 | −79 | 9 | Relegation to Distritais |

== Terceira Divisão – Série B ==
| Pos | Team | Pld | W | D | L | GF | GA | GD | Pts | Promotion or relegation |
|---|---|---|---|---|---|---|---|---|---|---|
| 1 | Dragões Sandinenses | 32 | 21 | 4 | 7 | 61 | 30 | +31 | 67 | Promotion to Segunda Divisão |
| 2 | AD Lousada | 32 | 20 | 7 | 5 | 74 | 43 | +31 | 67 | Promotion to Segunda Divisão |
| 3 | Lusitânia Lourosa | 32 | 16 | 12 | 4 | 62 | 31 | +31 | 60 | |
| 4 | CD Trofense | 32 | 15 | 10 | 7 | 50 | 33 | +17 | 55 | |
| 5 | GD Torre de Moncorvo | 32 | 14 | 6 | 12 | 42 | 41 | +1 | 48 | |
| 6 | SC Lamego | 32 | 13 | 7 | 12 | 57 | 52 | +5 | 46 | |
| 7 | SC Rio Tinto | 32 | 13 | 6 | 13 | 62 | 59 | +3 | 45 | |
| 8 | GD Serzedelo | 32 | 12 | 8 | 12 | 41 | 41 | 0 | 44 | |
| 9 | GD Ribeirão | 32 | 12 | 8 | 12 | 46 | 46 | 0 | 44 | |
| 10 | SC Cambres | 32 | 11 | 10 | 11 | 42 | 41 | +1 | 43 | |
| 11 | FC Tirsense | 32 | 10 | 9 | 13 | 48 | 54 | −6 | 39 | |
| 12 | Pedrouços AC | 32 | 11 | 6 | 15 | 36 | 44 | −8 | 39 | |
| 13 | Rebordosa AC | 32 | 10 | 8 | 14 | 33 | 52 | −19 | 38 | |
| 14 | Amarante FC | 32 | 9 | 9 | 14 | 41 | 61 | −20 | 36 | |
| 15 | União Nogueirense | 32 | 7 | 10 | 15 | 41 | 53 | −12 | 31 | Relegation to Distritais |
| 16 | FC Avintes | 32 | 6 | 7 | 19 | 45 | 80 | −35 | 25 | Relegation to Distritais |
| 17 | UD Valonguense | 32 | 5 | 7 | 20 | 39 | 59 | −20 | 22 | Relegation to Distritais |

== Terceira Divisão – Série C ==
| Pos | Team | Pld | W | D | L | GF | GA | GD | Pts | Promotion or relegation |
|---|---|---|---|---|---|---|---|---|---|---|
| 1 | SC Esmoriz | 34 | 23 | 6 | 5 | 62 | 24 | +38 | 75 | Promotion to Segunda Divisão |
| 2 | RD Águeda | 34 | 18 | 8 | 8 | 65 | 36 | +29 | 62 | Promotion to Segunda Divisão |
| 3 | GD Mangualde | 34 | 19 | 5 | 10 | 53 | 42 | +11 | 62 | |
| 4 | GD Milheiroense | 34 | 16 | 9 | 9 | 45 | 32 | +13 | 57 | |
| 5 | CD Estarreja | 34 | 16 | 6 | 12 | 59 | 48 | +11 | 54 | |
| 6 | SC Penalva do Castelo | 34 | 15 | 8 | 11 | 48 | 39 | +9 | 53 | |
| 7 | FC Cesarense | 34 | 15 | 6 | 13 | 51 | 39 | +12 | 51 | |
| 8 | GD Gafanha | 34 | 14 | 6 | 14 | 50 | 46 | +4 | 48 | |
| 9 | AD Valecambrense | 34 | 13 | 9 | 12 | 53 | 47 | +6 | 48 | |
| 10 | AD Sátão | 34 | 13 | 8 | 13 | 48 | 50 | −2 | 47 | |
| 11 | Anadia FC | 34 | 14 | 5 | 15 | 41 | 50 | −9 | 47 | |
| 12 | Miléu SC | 34 | 13 | 5 | 16 | 51 | 62 | −11 | 44 | |
| 13 | AD Fornos de Algodres | 34 | 13 | 5 | 16 | 56 | 60 | −4 | 44 | |
| 14 | AA Avanca | 34 | 12 | 7 | 15 | 54 | 50 | +4 | 43 | |
| 15 | FC Arouca | 34 | 11 | 6 | 17 | 44 | 60 | −16 | 39 | Relegation to Distritais |
| 16 | AC Cucujães | 34 | 11 | 5 | 18 | 44 | 61 | −17 | 38 | Relegation to Distritais |
| 17 | GD São Roque | 34 | 8 | 5 | 21 | 36 | 65 | −29 | 29 | Relegation to Distritais |
| 18 | AD Ala Arriba | 34 | 5 | 5 | 24 | 28 | 77 | −49 | 20 | Relegation to Distritais |

== Terceira Divisão – Série D ==
| Pos | Team | Pld | W | D | L | GF | GA | GD | Pts | Promotion or relegation |
|---|---|---|---|---|---|---|---|---|---|---|
| 1 | Estrela Portalegre | 34 | 28 | 3 | 3 | 68 | 19 | +49 | 87 | Promotion to Segunda Divisão |
| 2 | Sertanense FC | 34 | 21 | 5 | 8 | 62 | 26 | +36 | 68 | Promotion to Segunda Divisão |
| 3 | CA Riachense | 34 | 20 | 8 | 6 | 61 | 26 | +35 | 68 | |
| 4 | SC Lourinhanense | 34 | 17 | 13 | 4 | 53 | 30 | +23 | 64 | |
| 5 | AD Portomosense | 34 | 16 | 12 | 6 | 64 | 28 | +36 | 60 | |
| 6 | União Almeirim | 34 | 12 | 13 | 9 | 40 | 34 | +6 | 49 | |
| 7 | GD Portalegrense | 34 | 14 | 4 | 16 | 45 | 49 | −4 | 46 | |
| 8 | CD Torres Novas | 34 | 11 | 13 | 10 | 40 | 31 | +9 | 46 | |
| 9 | GD Peniche | 34 | 13 | 7 | 14 | 34 | 31 | +3 | 46 | |
| 10 | GDR Bidoeirense | 34 | 11 | 10 | 13 | 36 | 45 | −9 | 43 | |
| 11 | União Mirense | 34 | 11 | 8 | 15 | 31 | 42 | −11 | 41 | |
| 12 | Vitória Sernache | 34 | 8 | 12 | 14 | 41 | 47 | −6 | 36 | |
| 13 | CA Mirandense | 34 | 9 | 9 | 16 | 25 | 48 | −23 | 36 | |
| 14 | UDR Caranguejeira | 34 | 9 | 9 | 16 | 43 | 54 | −11 | 36 | |
| 15 | GC Alcobaça | 34 | 9 | 9 | 16 | 36 | 52 | −16 | 36 | Relegation to Distritais |
| 16 | CR Alqueidão da Serra | 34 | 9 | 8 | 17 | 29 | 53 | −24 | 35 | Relegation to Distritais |
| 17 | GD Teixosense | 34 | 6 | 7 | 21 | 21 | 50 | −29 | 25 | Relegation to Distritais |
| 18 | UFCI Tomar | 34 | 4 | 6 | 24 | 29 | 93 | −64 | 18 | Relegation to Distritais |

== Terceira Divisão – Série E ==
| Pos | Team | Pld | W | D | L | GF | GA | GD | Pts | Promotion or relegation |
|---|---|---|---|---|---|---|---|---|---|---|
| 1 | CD Mafra | 34 | 24 | 7 | 3 | 71 | 22 | +49 | 79 | Promotion to Segunda Divisão |
| 2 | AD Pontassolense | 34 | 20 | 9 | 5 | 59 | 32 | +27 | 69 | Promotion to Segunda Divisão |
| 3 | CD Ribeira Brava | 34 | 21 | 5 | 8 | 57 | 24 | +33 | 68 | |
| 4 | Portosantense | 34 | 18 | 6 | 10 | 47 | 30 | +17 | 60 | |
| 5 | SU Sintrense | 34 | 17 | 8 | 9 | 44 | 33 | +11 | 59 | |
| 6 | CD São Vicente | 34 | 16 | 7 | 11 | 47 | 45 | +2 | 55 | |
| 7 | AD Carregado | 34 | 13 | 9 | 12 | 46 | 42 | +4 | 48 | |
| 8 | GD Alcochetense | 34 | 11 | 14 | 9 | 33 | 28 | +5 | 47 | |
| 9 | Águias Camarate | 34 | 12 | 9 | 13 | 49 | 38 | +11 | 45 | |
| 10 | AD Fazendense | 34 | 12 | 8 | 14 | 47 | 60 | −13 | 44 | |
| 11 | GS Loures | 34 | 12 | 7 | 15 | 44 | 52 | −8 | 43 | |
| 12 | CF Benfica | 34 | 12 | 6 | 16 | 38 | 39 | −1 | 42 | |
| 13 | 1º Maio Sarilhense | 34 | 11 | 5 | 18 | 36 | 48 | −12 | 38 | |
| 14 | SG Sacavenense | 34 | 9 | 9 | 16 | 32 | 50 | −18 | 36 | |
| 15 | Santana | 34 | 9 | 8 | 17 | 36 | 54 | −18 | 35 | Relegation to Distritais |
| 16 | CF Avisenses | 34 | 9 | 8 | 17 | 36 | 61 | −25 | 35 | Relegation to Distritais |
| 17 | GD Samora Correia | 34 | 6 | 6 | 22 | 27 | 58 | −31 | 24 | Relegation to Distritais |
| 18 | GD Coruchense | 34 | 6 | 5 | 23 | 36 | 69 | −33 | 23 | Relegation to Distritais |

== Terceira Divisão – Série F ==
| Pos | Team | Pld | W | D | L | GF | GA | GD | Pts | Promotion or relegation |
|---|---|---|---|---|---|---|---|---|---|---|
| 1 | Oriental Lisboa | 34 | 21 | 8 | 5 | 73 | 26 | +47 | 71 | Promotion to Segunda Divisão |
| 2 | Lusitano VRSA | 34 | 21 | 6 | 7 | 69 | 36 | +33 | 69 | Promotion to Segunda Divisão |
| 3 | Estrela Vendas Novas | 34 | 19 | 5 | 10 | 64 | 38 | +26 | 62 | |
| 4 | Vasco da Gama AC Sines | 34 | 18 | 5 | 11 | 64 | 41 | +23 | 59 | |
| 5 | CD Beja | 34 | 17 | 7 | 10 | 53 | 45 | +8 | 58 | |
| 6 | CD Pinhalnovense | 34 | 16 | 9 | 9 | 53 | 44 | +9 | 57 | |
| 7 | CD Montijo | 34 | 15 | 8 | 11 | 63 | 50 | +13 | 53 | |
| 8 | Silves FC | 34 | 13 | 9 | 12 | 55 | 48 | +7 | 48 | |
| 9 | SR Almancilense | 34 | 13 | 6 | 15 | 42 | 38 | +4 | 45 | |
| 10 | Esperança Lagos | 34 | 10 | 13 | 11 | 34 | 41 | −7 | 43 | |
| 11 | Sesimbra | 34 | 12 | 7 | 15 | 43 | 61 | −18 | 43 | |
| 12 | CDR Quarteirense | 34 | 11 | 9 | 14 | 42 | 41 | +1 | 42 | |
| 13 | Juventude Évora | 34 | 10 | 10 | 14 | 53 | 61 | −8 | 40 | |
| 14 | Lusitano Évora | 34 | 11 | 7 | 16 | 48 | 48 | 0 | 40 | |
| 15 | Pescadores | 34 | 8 | 12 | 14 | 43 | 66 | −23 | 36 | Relegation to Distritais |
| 16 | União Montemor | 34 | 9 | 6 | 19 | 43 | 73 | −30 | 33 | Relegation to Distritais |
| 17 | Ourique DC | 34 | 9 | 4 | 21 | 43 | 71 | −28 | 31 | Relegation to Distritais |
| 18 | CA Aldenovense | 34 | 5 | 5 | 24 | 59 | 116 | −57 | 20 | Relegation to Distritais |

== Terceira Divisão – Série Açores ==
Série Açores – Preliminary League Table

| Pos | Team | Pld | W | D | L | GF | GA | GD | Pts |
|---|---|---|---|---|---|---|---|---|---|
| 1 | União Micaelense | 18 | 15 | 3 | 0 | 43 | 5 | +38 | 48 |
| 2 | Madalena | 18 | 10 | 5 | 3 | 31 | 26 | +5 | 35 |
| 3 | Santiago FC | 18 | 8 | 7 | 3 | 29 | 23 | +6 | 31 |
| 4 | SC Angrense | 18 | 7 | 6 | 5 | 23 | 19 | +4 | 27 |
| 5 | Praiense SC | 18 | 7 | 4 | 7 | 25 | 17 | +8 | 25 |
| 6 | CD Santo António | 18 | 6 | 5 | 7 | 17 | 17 | 0 | 23 |
| 7 | Fayal SC | 18 | 6 | 2 | 10 | 19 | 25 | −6 | 20 |
| 8 | Boavista Ribeirinha | 18 | 5 | 3 | 10 | 18 | 27 | −9 | 18 |
| 9 | FC Flamengos | 18 | 3 | 4 | 11 | 27 | 46 | −19 | 13 |
| 10 | Águia DC | 18 | 2 | 3 | 13 | 8 | 35 | −27 | 9 |

Série Açores – Promotion Group

| Pos | Team | Pld | W | D | L | GF | GA | GD | BP | Pts | Promotion |
|---|---|---|---|---|---|---|---|---|---|---|---|
| 1 | União Micaelense | 8 | 6 | 0 | 2 | 16 | 10 | +6 | 48 | 66 | Promotion to Segunda Divisão |
| 2 | Madalena | 8 | 3 | 2 | 3 | 11 | 10 | +1 | 35 | 46 | |
| 3 | Praiense SC | 8 | 5 | 1 | 2 | 14 | 8 | +6 | 25 | 41 | |
| 4 | SC Angrense | 8 | 2 | 2 | 4 | 7 | 11 | −4 | 27 | 35 | |
| 5 | Santiago FC | 8 | 1 | 1 | 6 | 3 | 12 | −9 | 31 | 35 | |

Terceira Divisão - Série Açores Relegation Group

| Pos | Team | Pld | W | D | L | GF | GA | GD | BP | Pts | Relegation |
|---|---|---|---|---|---|---|---|---|---|---|---|
| 1 | CD Santo António | 8 | 2 | 3 | 3 | 4 | 5 | −1 | 23 | 32 | |
| 2 | FC Flamengos | 8 | 6 | 0 | 2 | 11 | 6 | +5 | 13 | 31 | |
| 3 | Boavista Ribeirinha | 8 | 3 | 3 | 2 | 8 | 5 | +3 | 18 | 30 | |
| 4 | Fayal SC | 8 | 0 | 4 | 4 | 3 | 9 | −6 | 20 | 24 | Relegation to Distritais |
| 5 | Águia DC | 8 | 2 | 4 | 2 | 8 | 8 | 0 | 9 | 19 | Relegation to Distritais |
