= 2000–01 Terceira Divisão =

Terceira Divisão
- Season: 2000–01

The 2000–01 Terceira Divisão season was the 54th season of the competition and the 11th season of recognised fourth-tier football in Portugal.

== Overview ==
The league was contested by 118 teams in 7 divisions of 10 to 18 teams.

== Terceira Divisão – Série A ==
Pos	Team	Pld	W	D	L	GF	GA	GD	Pts	Promotion or relegation
1	Caçadores das Taipas	34	21	7	6	65	30	+35	70	Promotion to Segunda Divisão
2	GD Joane	34	20	6	8	65	30	+35	66	Promotion to Segunda Divisão
3	SC Maria da Fonte	34	18	7	9	54	27	+27	61	
4	GD Serzedelo	34	18	4	12	50	44	+6	58	
5	AD os Limianos	34	15	7	12	57	47	+10	52	
6	Vilaverdense FC	34	14	9	11	41	36	+5	51	
7	SC Vianense	34	12	13	9	53	40	+13	49	
8	FC Amares	34	12	12	10	45	39	+6	48	
9	SC Valenciano	34	12	11	11	38	34	+4	47	
10	CF Fão	34	12	10	12	50	50	0	46	
11	ADC Montalegre	34	11	12	11	45	42	+3	45	
12	CD Monção	34	13	5	16	34	42	−8	44	
13	AD Terras de Bouro	34	11	10	13	41	45	−4	43	
14	Merelinense FC	34	12	6	16	39	57	−18	42	
15	Atlético Cabeceirense	34	10	8	16	40	53	−13	38	Relegation to Distritais
16	Neves FC	34	8	13	13	38	49	−11	37	Relegation to Distritais
17	GD Mirandês	34	6	10	18	28	67	−39	28	Relegation to Distritais
18	Juventude Pedras Salgadas	34	3	6	25	24	75	−51	15	Relegation to Distritais

== Terceira Divisão – Série B ==
Pos	Team	Pld	W	D	L	GF	GA	GD	Pts	Promotion or relegation
1	SC Vila Real	34	22	6	6	60	35	+25	72	Promotion to Segunda Divisão
2	FC Pedras Rubras	34	19	8	7	75	43	+32	65	Promotion to Segunda Divisão
3	Dragões Sandinenses	34	15	10	9	60	35	+25	55	
4	Pedrouços AC	34	15	6	13	52	49	+3	51	
5	GD Ribeirão	34	13	11	10	58	47	+11	50	
6	Rebordosa AC	34	13	11	10	41	41	0	50	
7	SC Esmoriz	34	13	10	11	46	40	+6	49	
8	SC Lamego	34	13	8	13	34	40	−6	47	
9	GD Torre de Moncorvo	34	12	11	11	53	50	+3	47	
10	FC Tirsense	34	12	10	12	41	41	0	46	
11	Amarante FC	34	12	9	13	44	47	−3	45	
12	SC Rio Tinto	34	11	11	12	52	43	+9	44	
13	FC Avintes	34	13	5	16	51	59	−8	44	
14	AD Lousada	34	13	5	16	48	51	−3	44	
15	Fiães SC	34	12	7	15	44	43	+1	43	Relegation to Distritais
16	AR São Martinho	34	9	5	20	34	69	−35	32	Relegation to Distritais
17	Lixa FC	34	8	7	19	32	52	−20	31	Relegation to Distritais
18	CD Paços de Brandão	34	7	8	19	44	64	−20	29	Relegation to Distritais

== Terceira Divisão – Série C ==
Pos	Team	Pld	W	D	L	GF	GA	GD	Pts	Promotion or relegation
1	Oliveira do Hospital	34	21	8	5	53	25	+28	71	Promotion to Segunda Divisão
2	GD Sourense	34	19	8	7	57	36	+21	65	Promotion to Segunda Divisão
3	FC Cesarense	34	18	9	7	62	40	+22	63	
4	CD Estarreja	34	14	12	8	51	35	+16	54	
5	AD Valecambrense	34	15	9	10	45	38	+7	54	
6	GD Gafanha	34	12	13	9	50	39	+11	49	
7	AD Sátão	34	13	9	12	36	37	−1	48	
8	GD Mangualde	34	12	11	11	39	32	+7	47	
9	Anadia FC	34	12	10	12	42	40	+2	46	
10	SC Penalva do Castelo	34	13	7	14	46	36	+10	46	
11	GD São Roque	34	13	6	15	43	51	−8	45	
12	AA Avanca	34	9	15	10	35	39	−4	42	
13	AD Fornos de Algodres	34	11	9	14	40	45	−5	42	
14	CA Mirandense	34	11	8	15	28	41	−13	41	
15	Oliveira de Frades	34	9	14	11	31	35	−4	41	Relegation to Distritais
16	GD Guarda	34	10	7	17	39	52	−13	37	Relegation to Distritais
17	CD Gouveia	34	5	8	21	28	62	−34	23	Relegation to Distritais
18	CD Lousanense	34	3	9	22	20	62	−42	18	Relegation to Distritais

== Terceira Divisão – Série D ==
Pos	Team	Pld	W	D	L	GF	GA	GD	Pts	Promotion or relegation
1	Benfica Castelo Branco	34	22	8	4	74	31	+43	74	Promotion to Segunda Divisão
2	Beneditense CD	34	20	10	4	64	29	+35	70	Promotion to Segunda Divisão
3	Estrela Portalegre	34	20	8	6	72	29	+43	68	
4	AD Portomosense	34	17	7	10	53	36	+17	58	
5	CD Portalegrense	34	15	10	9	51	35	+16	55	
6	GD Peniche	34	14	12	8	49	32	+17	54	
7	Vitória Sernache	34	15	8	11	54	47	+7	53	
8	AD Fazendense	34	15	6	13	55	47	+8	51	
9	GDR Bidoeirense	34	11	9	14	42	50	−8	42	
10	UD Caranguejeira	34	11	9	14	38	45	−7	42	
11	União Almeirim	34	10	9	15	36	52	−16	39	
12	Sertanense FC	34	10	9	15	44	58	−14	39	
13	UFCI Tomar	34	9	11	14	36	50	−14	38	
14	União Mirense	34	9	10	15	34	56	−22	37	
15	GD Ferroviários	34	9	10	15	35	57	−22	37	Relegation to Distritais
16	UD Santarém	34	8	8	18	54	74	−20	32	Relegation to Distritais
17	Escolar Bombarralense	34	6	8	20	37	71	−34	26	Relegation to Distritais
18	AC Alcanenense	34	5	8	21	33	62	−29	23	Relegation to Distritais

== Terceira Divisão – Série E ==
Pos	Team	Pld	W	D	L	GF	GA	GD	Pts	Promotion or relegation
1	CD Olivais e Moscavide	34	22	6	6	70	31	+39	72	Promotion to Segunda Divisão
2	Odivelas FC	34	21	9	4	63	21	+42	72	Promotion to Segunda Divisão
3	CD Mafra	34	20	7	7	77	38	+39	67	
4	GD Coruchense	34	16	8	10	45	29	+16	56	
5	Águias Camarate	34	15	5	14	49	59	−10	50	
6	CD Ribeira Brava	34	14	8	12	59	42	+17	50	
7	SU Sintrense	34	13	7	14	45	56	−11	46	
8	CD Portosantense	34	13	6	15	56	52	+4	45	
9	1º Maio Sarilhense	34	13	6	15	41	47	−6	45	
10	CD São Vicente	34	12	8	14	47	49	−2	44	
11	GD Samora Correia	34	12	8	14	42	51	−9	44	
12	SG Sacavenense	34	11	11	12	36	42	−6	44	
13	GD Alcochetense	34	11	10	13	47	47	0	43	
14	AD Pontassolense	34	11	9	14	45	43	+2	42	
15	Calipolense Vila Viçosa	34	11	6	17	41	68	−27	39	Relegation to Distritais
16	O Elvas CAD	34	10	7	17	47	58	−11	37	Relegation to Distritais
17	SC Lourel	34	9	5	20	42	83	−41	32	Relegation to Distritais
18	SL Fanhões	34	5	8	21	36	72	−36	23	Relegation to Distritais

== Terceira Divisão – Série F ==
Pos	Team	Pld	W	D	L	GF	GA	GD	Pts	Promotion or relegation
1	Amora FC	34	20	5	9	62	38	+24	65	Promotion to Segunda Divisão
2	Padernense Clube	34	19	7	8	67	40	+27	64	Promotion to Segunda Divisão
3	CD Pinhalnovense	34	19	5	10	57	33	+24	62	
4	Ourique DC	34	18	5	11	50	42	+8	59	
5	Vasco da Gama AC Sines	34	17	8	9	61	40	+21	59	
6	Esperança Lagos	34	16	5	13	44	39	+5	53	
7	Juventude Évora	34	14	9	11	59	46	+13	51	
8	Lusitano VRSA	34	14	7	13	38	38	0	49	
9	SR Almancilense	34	14	6	14	50	57	−7	48	
10	CDR Quarteirense	34	14	5	15	53	47	+6	47	
11	Estrela Vendas Novas	34	13	8	13	44	44	0	47	
12	CF Benfica	34	12	10	12	48	51	−3	46	
13	CD Beja	34	12	9	13	47	52	−5	45	
14	GD Pescadores	34	11	10	13	52	46	+6	43	
15	Fabril Barreiro	34	11	8	15	42	50	−8	41	Relegation to Distritais
16	FC Castrense	34	10	6	18	44	75	−31	36	Relegation to Distritais
17	Almada AC	34	7	4	23	44	69	−25	25	Relegation to Distritais
18	Palmelense FC	34	3	7	24	35	90	−55	16	Relegation to Distritais

== Terceira Divisão – Série Açores ==
Série Açores – Preliminary League Table

Pos	Team	Pld	W	D	L	GF	GA	GD	Pts
1	SC Lusitânia	18	12	4	2	33	8	+25	40
2	FC Madalena	18	12	2	4	31	15	+16	38
3	CD Santo António	18	9	6	3	29	15	+14	33
4	Praiense SC	18	9	5	4	25	15	+10	32
5	Santiago FC	18	8	4	6	20	19	+1	28
6	Angrense SC	18	6	4	8	17	26	−9	22
7	FC Flamengos	18	3	8	7	17	30	−13	17
8	SC Vilanovense	18	4	3	11	22	29	−7	15
9	CD Vila Franca	18	2	7	9	18	37	−19	13
10	Juventude Lajense	18	3	1	14	13	31	−18	10

Série Açores – Promotion Group

Pos	Team	Pld	W	D	L	GF	GA	GD	BP	Pts	Promotion
1	SC Lusitânia	8	4	2	2	17	10	+7	40	54	Promotion to Segunda Divisão
2	FC Madalena	8	3	1	4	11	20	−9	38	48	
3	CD Santo António	8	3	2	3	14	12	+2	33	44	
4	Praiense SC	8	2	2	4	11	10	+1	32	40	
5	Santiago FC	8	3	3	2	11	12	−1	28	40	

Terceira Divisão - Série Açores Relegation Group

Pos	Team	Pld	W	D	L	GF	GA	GD	BP	Pts	Relegation
1	Angrense SC	8	3	3	2	11	6	+5	22	34	
2	FC Flamengos	8	4	1	3	23	16	+7	17	30	
3	SC Vilanovense	8	3	3	2	14	9	+5	15	27	Relegation to Distritais
4	Juventude Lajense	8	3	2	3	8	18	−10	10	21	Relegation to Distritais
5	CD Vila Franca	8	1	3	4	10	17	−7	13	19	Relegation to Distritais
