= Taça AF Viseu =

- Founded: 16 July 1979; 47 years ago
- Region: Viseu
- Teams: 44 (2025–26)
- Current champions: Lamelas (1st title)
- Most championships: Mangualde (4 titles)
- Website: Taça AF Viseu

The Taça AF Viseu, generally known as the Taça Sócios de Mérito, is a men's football knockout cup competition held between the clubs of the Viseu Football Association and competed by semi-professional and amateur teams.

Winners receive the Taça AF Viseu trophy, qualify for the Taça de Portugal and a place in the Supertaça AF Viseu.

== Format ==
The cup is open to all clubs competing in the Viseu Football Association leagues. The competition is a knockout tournament with pairings drawn at random. Teams from Primeira Divisão enter at the preliminary round stage, those from Liga de Honra enter at the second qualifying round.

As of 2011, the third tier of the Viseu Football Association, Segunda Divisão was abolished after the restructure of the Portuguese football league system, drastically reducing the number of teams.

== History ==
The competition was instigated in 1979 with AF Viseu creating two cups: Taça Sócios de Mérito for clubs in the regional leagues and Taça Sócios Honorários for clubs in the national leagues. The first winners were Canas de Senhorim.

The vast majority of Taça Sócios de Mérito final matches have been in Viseu: most of these were played at Estádio do Fontelo, with other final being played at Estádios dos Trambelos and Mundão. Other venues used for the final were Estádio João Cardoso in Tondela, Parque Desportivo, in Oliveira de Frades, Estádio dos Remédios in Lamego, Complexo Desportivo Canas de Senhorim, in Nelas, Complexo Desporti, in Castro Daire, Parque Desportivo de Sant'Ana, in Penalva do Castelo, Estádio Dr. Orlando Mendes, in Santa Comba Dão, and the municipal stadiums in Nelas, Tarouca and Mangualde.

A penalty shoot-out has been required on seven occasions, in the 1989, 1998, 2004, 2007, 2013, 2015 and 2023 finals.

In 1984, Penalva do Castelo became the first club to achieve the double by winning the Taça Sócios de Mérito (beating Silgueiros 2–0) and the 1ª Divisão in the same season. Since then, 8 more clubes have completead the double, Lamego in 1992, Nelas in 1993, Tondela in 2005, Santacombadense in 2006, Mangualde in 2009, Sampedrense in 2010, Cinfães in 2024, and Mortágua have done it twice in 1988 and 2022.

In 1987, Sernancelhe became the first club outside the top division to win the Taça Sócios de Mérito, repeating the feat ten years later. In 1990, Ferreira de Aves also won the cup competing in a lower division. In 2012, Mangualde became the last side to date to win the competition from outside the top division. Six second-level clubs – Sátão in 1988, Santar in 1992, Parada de Gonta in 1995, UDC Sul in 1996, Tarouquense in 1999 and Mortágua in 2011 – have since reached the final, though all six lost.

There have been two local derbies played at the cup final: in 1993, Nelas defeated Canas de Senhorim and in 2026, Lamelas defeated Castro Daire.

As of 2026, 23 clubs have won the Taça Sócios de Mérito. The record for the most wins is held by Mangualde, with 4 victories. Silgueiros, Lamemgo, Santacombadense, Tondela, Mangualde, and Cinfães have successfully defended the title. Silgueiros have four consecutive finals between 1981 and 1984, becoming the first and only team to reach four consecutive finals. Silgueiros also have the most final appearances with seven. Lamelas are the current holders, having beaten Castro Daire 2–1 in the 2026 final.

== Finals ==
Key to list of winners
Match went to extra time
Match decided by a penalty shootout after extra time
Winning team won the Double
Team from outside the top tier of Viseu Football Association

Taça AF Viseu winners
Season	Winners	Score	Runners–up	Date	Venue
1979–80	Canas de Senhorim (1)	3–1	Oliveira de Frades	15 June 1980	Estádio do Fontelo
1980–81	Silgueiros (1)	2–1	Carvalhais	16 May 1981	Estádio dos Trambelos
1981–82	Silgueiros (2)	2–1	Oliveira de Frades	10 June 1982	Estádio dos Trambelos
1982–83	Briosa Pextrafil (1)	1–0	Silgueiros	4 June 1983	Estádio dos Trambelos
1983–84	Penalva do Castelo (1)	2–0	Silgueiros	20 May 1984	Estádio Municipal de Nelas
1984–85	Oliveira de Frades (1)	1–0	Paivense	19 May 1985	Parque Jogos Mundão
1985–86	Lusitano (1)	2–0	União Desportiva Cancela	1 June 1986	Estádio João Cardoso
1986–87	Sernancelhe (1)	3–1	Lamego	7 June 1987	Campo do Matão
1987–88	Mortágua (1)	1–0	Sátão	5 June 1988	Estádio Municipal de Nelas
1988–89	Moimenta da Beira (1)	0–0 (4–2)	Lamego	4 June 1989	Estádio Municipal de Tarouca
1989–90	Ferreira de Aves (1)	1–0	Carvalhais	17 June 1990	Estádio do Fontelo
1990–91	Lamego (1)	5–2	Santar	2 June 1991	Parque Desportivo Oliveira de Frades
1991–92	Lamego (2)	2–0	São João da Pesqueira	10 May 1992	Estádio dos Remédios (Note: Inicialy, the match was going to be played at Estádio Adriano Ferreira.)
1992–93	Nelas (1)	1–0	Canas de Senhorim	6 June 1993	Estádio João Cardoso
1993–94	Sernancelhe (2)	3–2	Moimenta da Beira	10 June 1994	Estádio do Fontelo
1994–95	Mangualde (1)	4–2	Parada de Gonta	4 June 1995	Complexo Desportivo Canas de Senhorim
1995–96	Lusitano (2)	5–1	UDC Sul	2 June 1996	Complexo Desportivo de Castro Daire
1996–97	Sernancelhe (3)	1–0	Oliveira de Frades	1 June 1997	Estádio Municipal de Mangualde
1997–98	Ferreira de Aves (2)	1–1 (3–2)	Cambres	7 June 1998	Complexo Desportivo de Castro Daire
1998–99	Souselo (1)	2–1	Tarouquense	6 June 1999	Estádio Municipal Fornelos
1999–2000	Cambres (1)	2–1	Paivense	4 June 2000	Estádio da Pedreira
2000–01	Santacombadense (1)	4–2	Canas de Senhorim	3 June 2001	Estádio João Cardoso
2001–02	Santacombadense (2)	2–1	Sampedrense	2 June 2002	Estádio do Fontelo
2002–03	Paivense (1)	4–1	Santar	1 June 2003	Parque Desportivo de Sant'Ana
2003–04	Tondela (1)	0–0 (4–2)	Nelas	30 May 2004	Estádio Dr. Orlando Mendes
2004–05	Tondela (2)	3–2	Lusitano	28 May 2005	Estádio do Fontelo
2005–06	Santacombadense (3)	6–0	Canas de Senhorim	4 June 2006	Estádio do Fontelo
2006–07	Cinfães (1)	3–3 (4–2)	Lamelas	3 June 2007	Estádio do Fontelo
2007–08	Mangualde (2)	2–1	Santacombadense	19 April 2008	Estádio do Fontelo
2008–09	Mangualde (3	2–0	Moimenta da Beira	31 May 2009	Estádio do Fontelo
2009–10	Sampedrense (2)	2–1	Lusitano	30 May 2010	Estádio do Fontelo
2010–11	Sátão (1)	1–0	Mortágua	22 May 2011	Estádio do Fontelo
2011–12	Mangualde (4)	3–1	Paivense	26 May 2012	Estádio do Fontelo
2012–13	Castro Daire (1)	1–1 (3–1)	Moimenta da Beira	25 May 2013	Estádio do Fontelo
2013–14	Paivense (2)	3–1	Moimenta da Beira	24 May 2014	Estádio do Fontelo
2014–15	Carregal do Sal (1)	2–2 (5–4)	Paivense	23 May 2015	Estádio do Fontelo
2015–16	Penalva do Castelo (2)	3–1	Moimenta da Beira	29 May 2016	Estádio João Cardoso
2016–17	Lamego (3)	3–0	Silgueiros	27 May 2017	Estádio Municipal Nossa Senhora dos Remédios
2017–18	Silgueiros (3)	3–2	Lamego	31 May 2018	Estádio do Fontelo
2018–19	Ferreira de Aves (3)	2–1	Silgueiros	26 May 2019	Estádio do Fontelo
2019–20	Abandoned due to COVID-19 pandemic				
2020–21	Abandoned due to COVID-19 pandemic				
2021–22	Mortágua (2)	3–0	Lamelas	21 May 2022	Estádio do Fontelo
2022–23	Cinfães (2)	0–0 (5–4)	Lusitano	29 May 2023	Estádio do Fontelo
2023–24	Cinfães (3)	2–0	Resende	2 June 2024	Estádio João Cardoso
2024–25	Carregal do Sal (2)	1–0	Oliveira de Frades	24 May 2025	Estádio do Fontelo
2025–26	Lamelas (1)	2–1	Castro Daire	23 May 2026	Estádio do Fontelo

== Total titles won ==
Club	Winners	Runners-up	Winning years	Runner-up years	Total final appearances
Mangualde	4	0	1995, 2008, 2009, 2012		4
Silgueiros	3	4	1981, 1982, 2018	1983, 1984, 2017, 2019	7
Lamego	3	3	1991, 1992, 2017	1987, 1989, 2018	6
Santacombadense	3	1	2001, 2002, 2006	2008	4
Sernancelhe	3	0	1987, 1994, 1997		3
Ferreira de Aves	3	0	1990, 1998, 2019		3
Cinfães	3	0	2007, 2023, 2024		3
Paivense	2	4	2003, 2014	1982, 2000, 2012, 2015	6
Lusitano	2	3	1986, 1996	2005, 2010, 2023	5
Mortágua	2	1	1988, 2022	2011	3
Tondela	2	0	2004, 2005		2
Penalva do Castelo	2	0	1984, 2016		2
Carregal do Sal	2	0	2015, 2025		2
Moimenta da Beira	1	5	1989	1994, 2009, 2013, 2014, 2016	6
Oliveira de Frades	1	4	1985	1980, 1982, 1997, 2025	5
Canas de Senhorim	1	3	1980	1993, 2001, 2006	4
Lamelas	1	2	2026	2007, 2022	3
Nelas	1	1	1993	2004	2
Cambres	1	1	2000	1998	2
Sampedrense	1	1	2010	2002	2
Sátão	1	1	2011	1988	2
Castro Daire	1	1	2013	2026	2
Briosa Pextrafil	1	0	1983		1
Souselo	1	0	1999		1
Carvalhais	0	2		1981, 1989	2
Santar	0	2		1991, 2003	2
União Desportiva Cancela	0	1		1986	1
São João da Pesqueira	0	1		1992	1
Parada de Gonta	0	1		1995	1
UDC Sul	0	1		1996	1
Tarouquense	0	1		1999	1
Resende	0	1		2024	1

=== Total titles won by council ===
City	Number of titles	Clubs
Viseu	6	Silgueiros (3), Lusitano (2), Briosa Pextrafil (1)
Cinfães	4	Cinfães (3), Souselo (1)
Mangualde	4	Mangualde (4)
Lamego	4	Lamego (3), Cambres (1)
Sátão	4	Ferreira de Aves (3), Sátão (1)
Santa Comba Dão	3	Santacombadense (3)
Sernancelhe	3	Sernancelhe (3)
Carregal do Sal	2	Carregal do Sal (2)
Castro Daire	2	Castro Daire (1), Lamelas (1)
Penalva do Castelo	2	Penalva do Castelo (2)
Tondela	2	Tondela (2)
Vila Nova de Paiva	2	Paivense (2)
Mortágua	2	Mortágua (2)
Canas de Senhorim	1	Canas de Senhorim (1)
Moimenta da Beira	1	Moimenta da Beira (1)
Nelas	1	Nelas (1)
Oliveira de Frades	1	Oliveira de Frades (1)
São Pedro do Sul	1	Sampedrense (1)
