= Licá =

Portuguese footballer (born 1988)

Personal information
- Full name: Luís Carlos Pereira Carneiro
- Date of birth: 8 September 1988 (age 38)
- Place of birth: Lamelas, Portugal
- Height: 1.81 m (5 ft 11 in)
- Position: Winger

Youth career
- 2001–2006: O Crasto

Senior career*
Years	Team	Apps	(Gls)
2006–2007	Social Lamas	2	(1)
2007–2011	Académica	16	(1)
2007–2008	→ Tourizense (loan)	34	(8)
2010–2011	→ Trofense (loan)	40	(9)
2011–2013	Estoril	59	(18)
2013–2016	Porto	25	(3)
2014–2015	→ Rayo Vallecano (loan)	21	(0)
2015–2016	→ Vitória Guimarães (loan)	29	(5)
2016–2017	Nottingham Forest	5	(0)
2017	→ Estoril (loan)	13	(1)
2017–2018	Granada	2	(0)
2018	Belenenses	14	(3)
2018–2020	B-SAD	67	(18)
2020–2021	Farense	23	(3)
2022	B-SAD	12	(0)
2023–2026	Lamelas	93	(61)
Total		455	(131)

International career
2009	Portugal U21	5	(1)
2013	Portugal	1	(0)
- * Club domestic league appearances and goals

Luís Carlos Pereira Carneiro (born 8 September 1988), known as Licá, is a Portuguese former professional footballer who played as a right winger.

He amassed Primeira Liga totals of 229 matches and 40 goals over 11 seasons, after starting his career with Académica. He represented six other top-flight clubs, mainly Estoril and B-SAD, and also had brief spells in Spain and England.

Licá won one cap for Portugal, in 2013.

== Club career ==
=== Early years ===
Born in Lamelas, Castro Daire, Licá joined Académica de Coimbra from the lower leagues in 2007, aged 19. He appeared rarely for the club over two Primeira Liga seasons, also being loaned to another modest side, G.D. Tourizense, during his contract; he scored his first goal in the top division on 22 February 2009, helping to a 3–1 home win against C.S. Marítimo.

In the 2010 January transfer window, Licá moved on loan to C.D. Trofense in the Segunda Liga, netting five goals in 27 games in his first full season as the Trofa team narrowly missed on promotion. From 2011 to 2013, he represented G.D. Estoril Praia; after finding the net on 12 occasions in his first year, being essential as his team returned to the top flight after seven years, he added six in all 30 matches in the second to help them overachieve for a final fifth position, with the subsequent qualification for the UEFA Europa League.

=== Porto ===
Licá signed for FC Porto on 29 May 2013, agreeing to a four-year contract. He scored his first official goal for his new team on 10 August, the first in a 3–0 victory over Vitória S.C. in the Supertaça Cândido de Oliveira.

On 1 August 2014, deemed surplus to requirements as practically all Portuguese players by new manager Julen Lopetegui, Licá was loaned to La Liga club Rayo Vallecano in a season-long move. He made his debut in the competition on 21 September, starting in a 4–2 away loss to Villarreal CF.

=== Nottingham Forest ===
On 31 August 2016, after a top-tier campaign with Vitória de Guimarães, Licá was released by Porto and signed for Nottingham Forest on a two-year deal, for a fee believed to be around £300,000. He first appeared in the EFL Championship on 14 September, featuring six minutes in a 2–2 draw at Rotherham United.

Licá returned to Portugal on 6 February 2017, joining former club Estoril on loan until the end of the season. Both he and the Cascais-based side wanted to make the deal permanent, but this never came to be because of wage demands.

=== Granada ===
On 31 August 2017, he mutually agreed to terminate his contract with Forest and signed with Segunda División side Granada CF later the same day. Having made only two substitute cameos in the league and started one Copa del Rey match, he was released on 31 January.

=== Belenenses ===
A free agent, Licá joined C.F. Os Belenenses on a four-month deal on 1 February 2018, extending his contract until 2020 that May. He scored a career-best in the Portuguese top division of 11 goals for the reorganised B-SAD in 2018–19, including March's goal of the month against Portimonense S.C. in a 2–2 draw.

=== Later career ===
On 14 November 2020, Licá joined S.C. Farense, again at zero cost until the end of the season. In a campaign that ended with relegation, he received the first red card of his career in a 3–1 home victory over Gil Vicente F.C. on 10 January.

Licá returned to last-placed Belenenses SAD on 10 February 2022, having been out of work since the summer. He returned to his hometown one year later, signing with amateurs ACDR Lamelas in the Viseu Football Association's district leagues.

Licá announced his retirement in May 2026, aged 37.

== International career ==
Licá was part of the Portugal under-21 team that took silver at the 2009 Lusofonia Games on home soil. He played all four matches, scoring in a 4–1 win over Angola on the final day.

On 10 September 2013, shortly after having moved to Porto, Licá made his debut for the senior national team, playing the last six minutes of a 3–1 friendly loss to Brazil at the Gillette Stadium in the United States.

== Personal life ==
Licá's father and his older brother Pedro Jorge were also footballers. While the latter spent a couple of youth years at Boavista FC, both mainly played for local amateur clubs.

== Career statistics ==
Appearances and goals by club, season and competition
Club	Season	League			National cup		League cup		Continental		Other		Total	
Club	Season	Division	Apps	Goals	Apps	Goals	Apps	Goals	Apps	Goals	Apps	Goals	Apps	Goals
Social Lamas	2006–07	Terceira Divisão	2	1	0	0	—		—		—		2	1
Académica	2007–08	Primeira Liga	0	0	0	0	0	0	—		—		0	0
Académica	2008–09	Primeira Liga	9	1	1	0	4	1	—		—		14	2
Académica	2009–10	Primeira Liga	7	0	0	0	3	0	—		—		10	0
Académica	Total		16	1	1	0	7	1	—		—		24	2
Tourizense (loan)	2007–08	Segunda Divisão	34	8	0	0	—		—		—		34	8
Trofense (loan)	2009–10	Liga de Honra	13	4	0	0	0	0	—		—		13	4
Trofense (loan)	2010–11	Liga de Honra	27	5	0	0	3	0	—		—		30	5
Trofense (loan)	Total		40	9	0	0	3	0	—		—		43	9
Estoril	2011–12	Liga de Honra	29	12	4	1	8	1	—		—		41	14
Estoril	2012–13	Primeira Liga	30	6	1	0	4	0	—		—		35	6
Estoril	Total		59	18	5	1	12	1	—		—		76	20
Porto	2013–14	Primeira Liga	25	3	1	0	1	0	8 (Note: Six appearances in UEFA Champions League, two appearances in UEFA Europa League)	0	1 (Note: Appearance in Supertaça Cândido de Oliveira)	1	36	4
Rayo Vallecano (loan)	2014–15	La Liga	21	0	2	0	—		—		—		23	0
Vitória Guimarães (loan)	2015–16	Primeira Liga	29	5	1	0	1	1	2 (Note: Appearances in UEFA Europa League)	0	—		33	6
Nottingham Forest	2016–17	Championship	5	0	1	0	1	0	—		—		7	0
Estoril (loan)	2016–17	Primeira Liga	13	1	2	0	0	0	—		—		15	1
Granada	2017–18	Segunda División	2	0	1	0	—		—		—		3	0
Belenenses	2017–18	Primeira Liga	14	3	0	0	0	0	—		—		14	3
B-SAD	2018–19	Primeira Liga	34	11	2	1	4	0	—		—		40	12
B-SAD	2019–20	Primeira Liga	33	7	2	1	1	0	—		—		36	8
B-SAD	Total		67	18	4	2	5	0	—		—		76	20
Farense	2020–21	Primeira Liga	23	3	1	0	—		—		—		24	3
B-SAD	2021–22	Primeira Liga	12	0	0	0	0	0	—		—		12	0
Lamelas	2022–23	Divisão de Honra	12	5	—		—		—		1 (Note: Appearance in Taça AF Viseu)	1	13	6
Lamelas	2023–24	Campeonato de Portugal	23	7	1	1	—		—		1 (Note: Appearance in Supertaça Viseu)	0	25	8
Lamelas	2024–25	Divisão de Honra	29	33	—		—		—		3	2	32	35
Lamelas	2025–26	Divisão de Honra	29	16	—		—		—		4	3	33	19
Lamelas	Total		93	61	1	1	—		—		9	6	103	68
Career total			455	131	20	4	30	3	10	0	10	7	525	145

== Honours ==
Estoril

- Segunda Liga: 2011–12

Porto

- Supertaça Cândido de Oliveira: 2013

Lamelas

- Divisão de Honra: 2022–23
- Supertaça AF Viseu: 2023
- Taça AF Viseu: 2025–26

Portugal U21

- Lusofonia Games: Silver medal 2009

Individual

- Segunda Liga Player of the Year: 2011–12
