= Sanussi Camará =

Bissau-Guinean footballer

Personal information
- Date of birth: 24 December 1979 (age 46)
- Height: 1.78 m (5 ft 10 in)
- Position: Midfielder

Senior career*
Years	Team	Apps	(Gls)
1997–1998	Rio Tinto		
1998–2002	União de Lamas	16	(1)
1999–2000	→ São João de Ver		
2001–2002	→ São João de Ver	21	(1)
2003	Benfica e Castelo Branco	18	(3)
2003	Estarreja	12	(0)
2004–2005	Penalva do Castelo		
2005–2006	Covilhã	31	(3)
2006–2008	Penalva do Castelo	46	(6)
2008–2009	Pinhalnovense	13	(1)
- CS Oberkorn
- Les Aiglons Dalheim

International career
2000–2007	Guinea-Bissau	5	(1)
- * Club domestic league appearances and goals

Sanussi Camará (born 24 December 1979) is a retired Bissau-Guinean football midfielder.
