= Pedro Ganhão =

Portuguese footballer

Personal information
- Full name: Pedro Miguel Oliveira Ganhão
- Date of birth: 10 April 1984 (age 42)
- Place of birth: Benavente, Portugal
- Height: 1.80 m (5 ft 11 in)
- Position: Midfielder

Team information
- Current team: Casa Pia
- Number: 7

Youth career
- 2002–2003: Vilafranquense

Senior career*
Years	Team	Apps	(Gls)
2002–2004	Vilafranquense		
2004–2014	Carregado		
2014–	Casa Pia	94	(5)
- * Club domestic league appearances and goals as of 9 April 2017

Pedro Miguel Oliveira Ganhão (born 10 April 1984) is a Portuguese football player who plays for Casa Pia.

== Club career ==
He made his professional debut in the Segunda Liga for Carregado on 26 September 2009 in a game against Desportivo Aves.
