= Kisley =

Cape Verdean footballer

Personal information
- Full name: António Crispino Lopes Tavares
- Date of birth: 22 November 1990 (age 35)
- Place of birth: Santo Amaro Abade, Cape Verde
- Height: 1.88 m (6 ft 2 in)
- Position: Right winger

Youth career
- 2007–2008: Tirsense
- 2008–2009: Freamunde

Senior career*
| Years | Team | Apps | (Gls) |
| 2009–2011 | Lamego | | |
| 2011–2013 | Pedras Rubras | 53 | (12) |
| 2013–2014 | Felgueiras 1932 | 27 | (6) |
| 2014–2016 | União da Madeira | 40 | (5) |
| 2016–2017 | Famalicão | 22 | (5) |
| 2017–2018 | Lusitanos Saint-Maur | 24 | (3) |
| 2018–2019 | Covilhã | 14 | (0) |
| 2020–2021 | Valadares Gaia | 11 | (2) |

International career^{‡}
| 2014– | Cape Verde | 0 | (0) |
- * Club domestic league appearances and goals as of 05:10, 20 April 2022 (UTC) ‡ National team caps and goals as of 19 November 2014

António Crispino Lopes Tavares (born 22 November 1990), commonly known as Kisley, is a Cape Verdean professional footballer who plays as a winger.
