= Terceira Divisão =

- Founded: 1948; 78 years ago
- Folded: 2013; 13 years ago
- Country: Portugal
- Confederation: UEFA
- Number of clubs: 82
- Level on pyramid: 3 (1948–1990); 4 (1990–2013)
- Promotion to: Segunda Divisão
- Relegation to: Portuguese District FA Leagues
- Domestic cup: Taça de Portugal
- Most championships: Benfica e Castelo Branco, Bragança (4 Titles)
- Website: www.fpf.pt

The Terceira Divisão Portuguesa (in English: Portuguese Third Division) was a football league in Portugal, situated at the fourth level of the Portuguese football league system. The Third Division was initially the third level of the Portuguese pyramid but with the creation of the Segunda Liga in 1990–91, it became the fourth level. The competition merged with the Segunda Divisão at the end of the 2012–13 to form a new enlarged third-level league, the Campeonato Nacional de Seniores.

== Competition ==
The Terceira Divisão was established in 1948 and in its last season had 7 Sections with the Championship of each being divided into two phases.

The 6 Sections (A, B, C, D, E, F) within Mainland Portugal each had 12 teams and played 22 matches in the first phase. This was followed by the second phase where the top 6 teams in each section competed in the Promotion Group and played 10 matches to determine the champion teams from each Group that would be promoted to the Segunda Divisão. The last 6 teams in each Section competed in the Relegation Group and played 10 matches to determine the last 3 teams to be relegated to the District Leagues.

In the Azores Section, there were 10 teams that played 18 matches in the first phase. This was followed by the second phase where the top 4 teams in the Section competed in the Promotion Group and played 6 matches to determine the champion team that would be promoted to Segunda Divisão. However, limitations were placed on promotion to the Segunda Divisão dependent upon the position of the 6 teams from Azores competing in the Second Division Championship. If no teams from Azores finished in a relegation position in Second Division then the lowest-placed team played a two-leg play-off with the winners of the Third Division Azores Section to determine the remaining team from Azores that would compete in the Second Division. The last 6 teams in the Section competed in the Relegation Group and played 10 matches to determine the last 3 teams to be relegated to the District Leagues.

== Seasons - League Tables ==
Decade										
1940s:								1947–48	1948–49	1949–50
1950s:	1950–51	1951–52	1952–53	1953–54	1954–55	1955–56	1956–57	1957–58	1958–59	1959–60
1960s:	1960–61	1961–62	1962–63	1963–64	1964–65	1965–66	1966–67	1967–68	1968–69	1969–70
1970s:	1970–71	1971–72	1972–73	1973–74	1974–75	1975–76	1976–77	1977–78	1978–79	1979–80
1980s:	1980–81	1981–82	1982–83	1983–84	1984–85	1985–86	1986–87	1987–88	1988–89	1989–90
1990s:	1990–91	1991–92	1992–93	1993–94	1994–95	1995–96	1996–97	1997–98	1998–99	1999–2000
2000s:	2000–01	2001–02	2002–03	2003–04	2004–05	2005–06	2006–07	2007–08	2008–09	2009–10
2010s:	2010–11	2011–12	2012–13							

== List of champions ==
=== Third-tier league: 1947–1990 ===
Season	Champions	Final score	Runners-up
1947–48	Cova da Piedade	5–2	Académico de Viseu
1948–49	Almada	2–0	Tirsense
1949–50	Ovarense	6–3	Operário Vilanfranquese
1950–51	Juventude de Évora	1–0	Sanjoanense
1951–52	Lusitano VRSA	2–2, 2–1	Caldas
1952–53	Vila Real		Farense
1953–54	Coruchense	3–1	Académico do Porto
1954–55	O Elvas	2–1	Chaves
1955–56	Almada	4–0	Marinhense
1956–57	Serpa	2–1	Vila Real
1957–58	Oliveirense		Benfica e Castelo Branco
1958–59	Beira-Mar	3–2	Olivais
1959–60	Benfica e Castelo Branco	2–1	Sacavenense
1960–61	Seixal	3–1	Vila Real
1961–62	Varzim	2–1	Luso
1962–63	Os Leões	3–2	Famalicão
1963–64	União de Lamas	2–1	Almada
1964–65	União de Tomar	3–1	Ovarense
1965–66	Montijo	3–1	Tirsense
1966–67	Vizela	4–3	Tramagal
1967–68	Seixal	2–1	Boavista
1968–69	União de Lamas	1–1, 1–0	Farense
1969–70	Olhanense	2–0	União de Coimbra
1970–71	Cova da Piedade	3–0	Gil Vicente
1971–72	Caldas	3–2	Oliveirense
1972–73	Lusitânia Lourosa	1–0	Lusitano de Évora
1973–74	Paços de Ferreira	2–1	Estrela de Portalegre
1974–75	União de Santarém	2–0	Sporting da Covilhã
1975–76	Portalegrense	4–0	União de Coimbra
1976–77	Rio Ave	3–2	Cova da Piedade
1977–78	Sacavenense	3–1	Desportivo das Aves
1978–79	Bragança	5–3	Oriental
1979–80	Vasco da Gama	1–0	Sanjoanense
1980–81	União de Coimbra	3–1	O Elvas
1981–82	Vizela	2–1	Atlético CP
1982–83	Esperança de Lagos	2–2 (3–1p)	Guarda
1983–84	Championship play-off canceled		
1984–85	União de Santarém	2–1	Académico de Viseu
1985–86	Bragança	3–2	União de Santiago
1986–87	Louletano	1–0	Marco
1987–88	Portalegrense	1–0	Luso
1988–89	Mirense	4–2	Famalicão
1989–90	Montijo	1–0	Lousada

=== Fourth-tier league: 1990–2013 ===
Season	Champions			Final score		Runners-up		
1990–91	Vasco da Gama			4–2		Lusitânia Lourosa		
1991–92	Trofense			3–1		Olivais e Moscavide		
1992–93	Odivelas			1–1p		União de Coimbra		
1993–94	Limianos			2–0		Lusitano de Évora		
1994–95	Desportivo de Beja			1–0		Lamego		
1995–96	Fafe			1–0		Alcanenense		
1996–97	Dragões Sandinenses			1–0		Lourinhanense		
1997–98	Vilafranquense			3–0		Freamunde		
1998–99	Vianense			3–0 (7–6p)		Lusitânia		
1999–2000	Paredes			1–1		Seixal		
Season	Serie A	Serie B	Serie C	Serie D	Serie E	Serie F	Serie Azores	Serie Madeira
2000–01	Caçadores das Taipas	Vila Real	Oliveira do Hospital	Benfica e Castelo Branco	Olivais e Moscavide	Amora	Lusitânia	Not Held
Season	Champions			Final score		Runners-up		
2001–02	Mafra			1–0		Dragões Sandinenses		
Season	Serie A	Serie B	Serie C	Serie D	Serie E	Serie F	Serie Azores	Serie Madeira
2002–03	Bragança	Lixa	Estarreja	Alcaíns	Sintrense	Pinhalnovense	Santo António	Not Held
2003–04	Valenciano	Ribeirão	Penalva do Castelo	Benfica e Castelo Branco	Casa Pia	Atlético CP	Operário	Not Held
2004–05	Os Sandinenses	Aliados de Lordelo	Nelas	Portomosense	Benfica B	Silves	Madalena	Not Held
2005–06	Maria da Fonte	Vila Meã	União de Lamas	Eléctrico	Atlético CP	Estrela de Vendas Novas	Lusitânia	Not Held
2006–07	Valdevez	Leça	Anadia	Caldas	Caniçal	Lagoa	Angrense	Not Held
2007–08	Mirandela	Amarante	Arouca	Monsanto	Oriental	Mineiro Aljustrelense	Praiense	Not Held
2008–09	Vieira	Paredes	Tondela	Sertanense	Camacha	Louletano	Vitória do Pico	Not Held
2009–10	Macedo de Cavaleiros	Oliveirense	Coimbrões	Anadia	Casa Pia	Juventude de Évora	Madalena	Andorinha
2010–11	Mirandela	Amarante	Cinfães	Monsanto	Caldas	Estrela de Vendas Novas	Angrense	Ribeira Brava
2011–12	Joane	Cesarense	Académico de Viseu	Benfica e Castelo Branco	Futebol Benfica	Farense	Lusitânia	Pontassolense
2012–13	Bragança	Felgueiras 1932	Grijó	Sourense	Lourinhanense	União Montemor	Praiense	Not held

=== Titles ===
- 4 titles: Benfica e Castelo Branco, Bragança
- 3 titles: Montijo, União de Lamas, Caldas, Lusitânia
- 2 titles: Almada, Seixal, Cova da Piedade, Vizela, Lusitânia Lourosa, União de Santarém, Portalegrense, Vasco da Gama, Vila Real, Estarreja, Atlético CP, Paredes, Louletano, Juventude de Évora, Anadia, Casa Pia, Madalena, Mirandela, Amarante, Monsanto, Estrela de Vendas Novas, Angrense, Praiense
- 1 title: Ovarense, Lusitano VRSA, Coruchense, O Elvas, Serpa, Oliveirense, Beira-Mar, Varzim, Os Leões, União de Tomar, Olhanense, Caldas, Paços de Ferreira, Rio Ave, Sacavenense, União de Coimbra, Esperança de Lagos, Desportivo das Aves, Estrela de Portalegre, Campinense, Mirense, Trofense, Odivelas, Limianos, Desportivo de Beja, Fafe, Dragões Sandinenses, Vilafranquense, Vianense, Caçadores das Taipas, Oliveira do Hospital, Olivais e Moscavide, Amora, Mafra, Lixa, Alcaíns, Sintrense, Pinhalnovense, Santo António, Valenciano, Ribeirão, Penalva do Castelo, Operário, Os Sandinenses, Aliados de Lordelo, Nelas, Portomosense, Benfica B, Silves, Maria da Fonte, Vila Meã, Eléctrico, Valdevez, Leça, Caniçal, Lagoa, Arouca, Oriental, Mineiro Aljustrelense, Vieira, Tondela, Sertanense, Camacha, Vitória do Pico, Macedo de Cavaleiros, Oliveirense, Coimbrões, Andorinha, Cinfães, Ribeira Brava, Cesarense, Académico de Viseu, Futebol Benfica, Farense, Pontassolense, Felgueiras 1932, Grijó, Sourense, Lourinhanense, União Montemor, Joane

Sporting positions
Preceded by –	Third tier of Portuguese football 1948–1990	Succeeded by Segunda Divisão
