= Piojo =

Piojo is Spanish for louse. Piojo may also refer to:

== Places ==
- Rancho El Piojo, Mexican land-grant in present-day California
- Isla Piojo, island in the Gulf of California
- Piojó, a municipality and town in the Colombian department of Atlántico

== People ==
- Los Piojos, Argentine rock band
- Miguel Herrera (born 1968), Mexican former football defender and manager known as Piojo
- Claudio López (footballer) (born 1974), Argentine football forward known as Piojo
- Roberto Alvarado (born 1998), Mexican football winger known as Piojo
- Piojo (footballer, born 1985), Argentine football striker
- Piojo (footballer, born 1989), Spanish football winger
