= Estádio João Cardoso =

Football stadium in Tondela, Portugal

Coordinates: 40°30′43.348″N 8°4′58.170″W

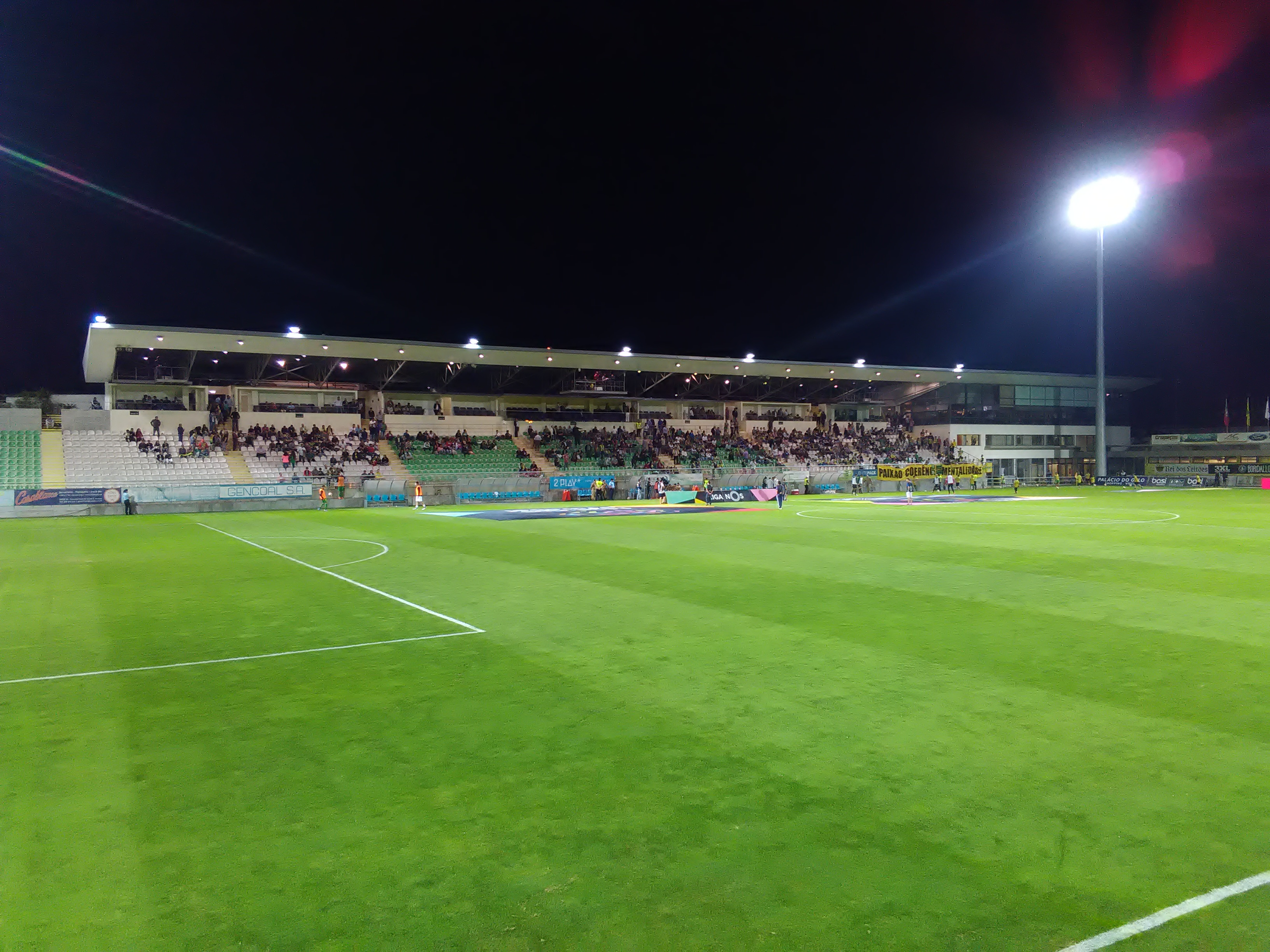
- Interactive map of Estádio João Cardoso
- Location: Tondela, Portugal
- Owner: Clube Desportivo de Tondela
- Operator: Clube Desportivo de Tondela
- Capacity: 5,000
- Surface: Grass
- Record attendance: 4,987 (11 March 2017); C.D. Tondela 1–4 Sporting CP
- Field size: 102 x 68 metres

Construction
- Built: 2008
- Renovated: 2015

Tenant
- Tondela

The Estádio João Cardoso is a football stadium in Tondela, Portugal, with a capacity for 5,000 spectators. It is the home stadium of C.D. Tondela, currently playing in the Portuguese Primeira Liga.

The stadium, built in 2008, initially held a capacity of 2,674 spectators but following Tondela's promotion to the top division in 2015, the club upgraded the facility by building two new stands, bringing the capacity up to 5,000. The newly expanded stadium was inaugurated on 13 December 2015.

The stadium hosted the 2015-16 Taça AF Viseu final.

On 11 March 2017, there were 4,987 spectators in the match against Sporting CP, a new record for the stadium.

== Portugal national football team ==
The following national team matches were held in the stadium.

#	Date	National Team	Score	Opponent	Competition
1.	20 October 1997	Portugal U18	2–1	Bulgaria	1998 European Under-18 qualification
2.	21 September 2006	Portugal U20	3–0	Poland	Friendly
3.	10 May 2007	Portugal U16	3–1	Poland	Friendly
4.	17 January 2008	Portugal U20	2–1	Slovakia	Friendly
5.	28 October 2009	Portugal Women's	0–1	Finland	2011 FIFA Women's World Cup qualification
6.	5 April 2011	Portugal U18	0–1	Switzerland	Friendly
7.	29 October 2011	Portugal U17	0–1	Romania	2012 European Under-17 qualifying
8.	23 March 2018	Portugal U21	7–0	Liechtenstein	2019 European Under-21 qualifying
