= C.D. Tondela =

Portuguese professional football club

CD Tondela
- Full name: Clube Desportivo de Tondela
- Nicknames: CDT; Auriverdes (Gold and Greens)
- Short name: Tondela
- Founded: 6 June 1933; 93 years ago
- Ground: Estádio João Cardoso, Tondela
- Capacity: 5,000
- Owner: Jiang Lizhang
- President: Gilberto Neves Coimbra
- Head coach: Ricardo Costa
- League: Liga Portugal 2
- 2025–26: Primeira Liga, 17th of 18 (relegated)
- Website: www.cdtondela.pt
Home colours	Away colours	Third colours

Clube Desportivo de Tondela (Portuguese pronunciation: [tõˈdɛlɐ]) is a Portuguese professional football club that plays in Liga Portugal 2, the second tier of Portuguese football, following their relegation in the 2025–26 Primeira Liga. They are based in the town of Tondela and play in the Estádio João Cardoso. Founded in 1933, the club predominantly played within Portugal's regional leagues until their gradual climb up the league pyramid since 2004.

== History ==
=== Foundation and early years (1933–1986) ===
On 6 June 1933, Clube Desportivo de Tondela was founded through a merger of two clubs in the village of Tondela: the Tondela Football Club, founded in 1925, and the Operário Atlético Clube, founded in 1932.

=== Third Division (1986–1988) ===
On the 1985–86 season, Tondela won the Divisão Honra title for the third time and achieved the promotion to the Terceira Divisão for the first time. They came in 10th in their first season on a competition ruled by the Portuguese Football Federation. They were relegated in the next season as they finished in 15th.

=== Lower divisions (1999–2005) ===
After the relegation from Terceira Divisão in 1999, Tondela went on to compete in the Viseu Regional Division.

In the 2003–04 season, Tondela won the Taça AF Viseu, also known as Taça Sócios de Mérito, the club's first piece of silverware since 1986. In the next season, Tondela became champion of the AF Viseu Liga de Honra. They ended the season eight points ahead of runners-up Tarouquense, and ensured the return to Terceira Divisão.

Days later, Tondela retained the Taça AF Viseu title thus sealing the season with the double.

=== Returning to Third Division (2005–2009) ===
During the 2005–08 seasons, Tondela consolidated its position as an upper mid table club, ending those three seasons always in the seventh place.

In the 2008–09 season, Tondela signed central defender Diego, midfielder Gomes and Argentine striker Piojo. On 6 June 2009, Tondela became Third Division champion, after a 4–2 win against Fiães, thus being promoted to Segunda Divisão.

=== Second Division Era (2009–2012) ===
After the promotion from the Third Division, and a fourth place in the 2009–10 season, Tondela aimed the promotion to Segunda Liga. During the 2010 summer transfer window, Tondela signed Portuguese under-17 European champion, playmaker Márcio Sousa, veteran goalkeeper Rui Marcos and midfielder Fernando Ferreira. The club finished third in the 2010–11 season with 55 points. Despite not reaching their objectives, Tondela supporters wanted the continuity of manager Filipe Moreira, but he eventually left to Oriental.

The following season, former Benfica and Portugal player, Vítor Paneira was appointed as the new manager. Paneira further increased the efforts to build a solid Tondela team, with such signings as midfielders Magano and Tiago Barros, and Brazilian striker Rafael Batatinha.

Tondela topped the table after a 4–2 win against Espinho on 7 April 2012 and never relinquished their lead. They were crowned champions of Segunda Divisão – Série Centro in Estádio do Bessa after a 1–0 win against Boavista. Their renewed defence, consisting of central defenders Daniel Materazzi, Pica, and the versatile Carlos André, fullbacks Hélder Lopes and Pedrosa, defensive midfielder Fábio Pacheco and former Portuguese under-20 international goalkeeper Nuno Avelino, conceded just 22 goals all season and kept 13 clean sheets.

Consequently, they took part in the promotion play-off against Varzim and Fatima, Serie Norte and Serie Sul champions respectively. On 3 June 2012, after a 1–1 draw against Fatima in Estádio João Cardoso, Tondela achieved their third promotion in eight years, and their first promotion to Segunda Liga. They were runners-up in the play-off, finishing five points behind Varzim.

=== Joining the Liga de Honra (2012–2015) ===
The 2012–13 season, the club's first at the professional level, ended with a mid-table finish. It was also Tondela's first appearance in the Taça da Liga.

On 8 November 2013, Paneira was sacked, being replaced three days later by his former teammate, Álvaro Magalhães. After a 9th place in the championship, Álvaro Magalhães left Tondela by "mutual consent" and Carlos Pinto (who had won the 2013–14 Campeonato Nacional with Freamunde) was appointed as the club's new manager. He took with him five players: goalkeeper Rui Nereu, defender Vítor Alves, midfielder Edu Machado and forwards Luís Machado and Joel Silva.

On 6 October 2014, Pinto left Tondela due to poor results. One day later, Quim Machado was announced as Pinto's successor.

The club spent most of the 2014–15 season near the top of the table, and by early April they were at first place. On 24 May 2015, on the final day of the season, a 1–1 draw away at Freamunde was enough to clinch the Championship title, and a first promotion to the top flight of Portuguese football. The goal was scored by André Carvalhas through a direct free kick in the last minute of the game.

=== Into the Primeira Liga (2015–2022) ===
On 30 May 2015, Tondela announced the return of Vítor Paneira as the club's manager on a one-year contract. As part of the pre-season friendlies, Tondela played its first two matches abroad: the first one was a 1–1 draw against Hamm Benfica, in Luxembourg; the second was a 3–2 win against Millwall, at their ground, The Den.

Since Tondela's home was undergoing reconstruction, the club debuted in the top flight of Portuguese football playing at the Estádio Municipal de Aveiro on 14 August 2015. The match ended in a controversial 1–2 defeat against Sporting CP. The club's first win in the competition came on the third-round, a 1–0 home win against Nacional da Madeira.

On 6 October 2015 manager Vítor Paneira left the club by mutual consent, with Rui Bento being appointed his successor on the same day. Bento was sacked two months later, following a succession of poor results, leaving the club on the last place with only 5 points. Petit was appointed the new manager on the next day.

At the end of the first half of the season, Tondela had only 8 points from 17 games. By 14 March 2016 they were 11 points adrift from safety. Between the 27th and the 33rd matchdays, the club made 14 points. In the last round, Tondela won against the relegated Académica de Coimbra by 2–0 and Rio Ave won 2–1 against União da Madeira, meaning that the Auriverdes finished the season in 16th place with 30 points, ahead of União da Madeira. Petit successfully led Tondela to safety from relegation with the feat being dubbed a miracle. Highlights included a 2–2 away draw against Sporting, an historic first time win at Estádio do Dragão by 1–0, and a 4–1 win at Paços de Ferreira.

On the first match of the 2016–17 season, Tondela lost 0–2 against Benfica in the first match that one of the Big Three played in Tondela's ground. On 9 January 2016, Petit left the club and was replaced by Pepa.

Tondela were relegated at the end of the 2021–22 season, but at the same time made history by reaching the 2022 Taça de Portugal final where they lost 3–1 to Porto. Tondela also qualified for the 2022 Supertaça Cândido de Oliveira as Taça de Portugal runners-up due to Porto winning the double that season. Porto won the Supertaça by 3–0.

== Crest and colours ==
Clube Desportivo de Tondela adopt the colors green and yellow of the city. Its home strip has been a yellow shirt, with multiple green stripes, black shorts and yellow socks.

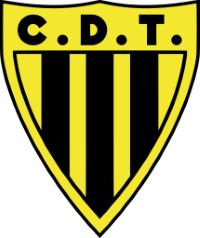
Tondela's first crest

== Stadium ==
The Estádio João Cardoso is a football stadium in Tondela, Portugal, the home of Tondela.

In 2004 began the remodeling and improvement of the stadium. The new João Cardoso Stadium Complex includes two playing fields for football, one pitch (field 1) and one training pitch (field 2) and also features a sports pavilion.

In 2008, the stadium underwent new requalification works. The official inauguration date was on 27 May 2008. The stadium hosted a Portugal national football team training match, while in their preparation for the UEFA Euro 2008.

Following Tondela's promotion to the top division in 2015, the club upgraded the facility by building two new stands, bringing the capacity up to 5,000, with an increased North Stand (formerly named Bancada CDT) and a renewed Top Stand. The new Top Stand was built from scratch, upgrading the capacity from 700 standing places to 1,500 seating places, while the new North Stand increased the seating capacity from 100 spectators to 2,000. It also has bars, bathrooms and a commercial space below. The newly expanded stadium was inaugurated on 13 December 2015, in a 0–1 defeat against SC Braga.

The stadium has also hosted some matches of Portugal's U-20, U-18, U-16 and Women squads.

== Supporters ==
Tondela has an organized group of supporters (claque, in Portugal) named Febre Amarela (Yellow Fever) founded in 2009.

== Players ==
=== Current squad ===
As of 18 September 2026

Note: Flags indicate national team as defined under FIFA eligibility rules; some limited exceptions apply. Players may hold more than one non-FIFA nationality.

No.	Pos.	Nation	Player
1	GK	ESP	Lucas Cañizares
2	DF	BRA	Bebeto
3	DF	ENG	Ian Kamga
4	DF	POR	Christian Marques
5	DF	POR	João Afonso
6	DF	ESP	Farru
7	FW	POR	Cascavel
8	MF	CPV	Hélder Tavares
9	FW	BRA	João Lima
10	FW	GHA	Henry Addo
11	FW	BRA	Richarllyson
12	DF	BRA	Zé Ricardo
13	MF	RSA	Yaya Sithole
14	MF	ESP	Xabi Huarte
15	DF	POR	Carraça

No.	Pos.	Nation	Player
17	FW	ARG	Gastón Novero
19	FW	POR	Tomané
20	MF	POR	Hugo Félix
21	DF	POR	Gabriel Alves
22	DF	CPV	Bruno Almeida
23	DF	COL	Brayan Medina
25	GK	ESP	Ruly García
26	FW	NED	Arjen van der Heide
28	GK	BRA	Carlão
37	MF	BRA	Mateus Sarará
77	FW	POR	Tiago Dias
92	MF	POR	Leonardo Silva
95	GK	POR	Rodrigo da Silva
97	MF	BRA	Cícero

=== Player of the Year ===
Year	Winner
2012–13	(Portugal) Fábio Pacheco
2013–14	(Portugal) Fábio Pacheco
2014–15	(Portugal) Tozé Marreco
2015–16	(Portugal) Cláudio Ramos
2016–17	(Portugal) Cláudio Ramos
2017–18	Not awarded
2018–19	(Portugal) Tomané
2019–20	(Honduras) Jonathan Toro
2020–21	(Spain) Mario González

== Managers ==
=== Managerial history ===
*	Caretaker manager

Name	Nationality	From	To	Record							Trophies	Notes
Name	Nationality	From	To	P	W	D	L	Win %	GF	GA	Trophies	Notes
Bernardino Mirita	Portugal	1971	1973									
Augusto Rocha	Portugal	1974	1975									
Vítor Correia	Portugal	1975	1978									
Mário Vasconcelos	Portugal	1978	1979	32	11	10	11	34.38	32	35		
João Augusto Alves	Brazil	1979	1981	68	23	16	29	33.82	80	89		
Arménio Gonçalves	Portugal	1981	1982	31	12	6	13	38.71	49	49		
Vítor Correia	Portugal	1982	1983	32	10	8	14	31.25	44	53		
João Maia	Portugal	1985	1986									
José Vítor Rodrigues	Portugal	1986	1987	33	13	7	13	39.39	38	41		
Álvaro Lima	Portugal	1987	1988	40	13	8	19	32.50	33	48		
Carlos Manuel Correia	Portugal	1990	1991	26	15	10	1	57.69	60	15		
João Cavaleiro	Portugal	1992	1994	72	29	22	21	40.28	66	58		
Luís Amaral	Portugal	1994	11 November 1994	12	2	3	7	16.67	10	19		
Luís Almeida	Portugal	11 November 1994	1996	58	21	13	24	36.21	66	83		
João Salcedas	Portugal	1 September 1996	16 February 1997	23	4	9	10	17.39	16	33		
Álvaro Lima	Portugal	23 February 1997	25 May 1997	12	3	2	7	25.00	9	20		
Joaquim Figueiredo	Portugal	1997	1998									
José Lobo	Portugal	1998	2000									
João Vinagre	Portugal	2000	2001									
José Marcelino	Portugal	2002	2002									
Celso Mendes	Portugal	2002	2003									
José Marcelino	Portugal	2003	2004									
Flávio Coimbra	Portugal	2004	2004								2003–04 Taça AF Viseu	
Diamantino Mocho	Portugal	2004	2005									
João Bento	Portugal	2005	2006	36	15	10	11	41.67	56	39	2004–05 Liga de Honra; 2004–05 Taça AF Viseu	
Luís Augusto Almeida	Portugal	10 September 2006	18 February 2007	16	8	5	3	50.00	23	15		
José Leal	Portugal	25 February 2007	13 May 2007	12	3	3	6	25.00	12	16		
Carlos Manuel Correia	Portugal	26 August 2007	9 September 2007	5	2	0	3	40.00	6	10		
Sérgio Freitas Abreu	Portugal	7 October 2007	11 November 2007	5	2	2	1	40.00	8	2		
João Bento	Portugal	25 November 2007	11 May 2008	23	9	7	7	39.13	27	18		
António Jesus Pereira	Portugal	2008	2010	70	34	16	20	48.57	124	77	2008–09 Terceira Divisão – Série C	
Filipe Moreira	Portugal	1 August 2010	13 May 2011	31	16	7	8	51.61	46	29		
Vítor Paneira	Portugal	24 May 2011	8 November 2013	104	49	25	30	47.12	157	125		
Paulo Cadete^{*}	Portugal	8 November 2013	11 November 2013	1	1	0	0	100.00	2	1		
Álvaro Magalhães	Portugal	11 November 2013	11 May 2014	27	9	7	11	33.33	18	19		
Carlos Pinto	Portugal	11 August 2014	6 October 2014	10	3	5	2	30.00	10	12		
Quim Machado	Portugal	7 October 2014	24 May 2015	36	18	13	5	50.00	57	39	2014–15 Segunda Liga	
Vítor Paneira	Portugal	30 May 2015	6 October 2015	7	1	1	5	14.29	3	7		
Rui Bento	Portugal	7 October 2015	8 December 2015	7	0	2	5	0.00	3	12		
Petit	Portugal	9 December 2015	9 January 2017	42	11	8	23	26.19	49	70		
Pepa	Portugal	10 January 2017	24 May 2019	95	29	22	44	30.53	116	137		
Natxo González	Spain	14 June 2019	5 August 2020	36	9	9	18	25.00	30	48		
Pako Ayestarán	Spain	10 August 2020	16 March 2022	68	22	9	37	32.35	81	115		
Nuno Campos	Portugal	16 March 2022	30 June 2022	10	1	5	4	10.00	12	19		
Tozé Marreco	Portugal	1 July 2022	10 April 2024	76	26	29	21	34.21	102	94		
Sérgio Gaminha	Portugal	11 April 2024	23 May 2024	6	1	1	4	16.67	5	8		
Luís Pinto	Portugal	30 May 2024	14 June 2025	34	17	13	4	50.00	58	35	2024–25 Liga Portugal 2	
Ivo Vieira	Portugal	14 June 2025	11 November 2025	13	2	3	8	15.38	11	24		
Cristiano Bacci	Italy	13 November 2025	29 March 2026	0	0	0	0	—	0	0		
Gonçalo Feio	Portugal	29 March 2026	26 May 2026									
Ricardo Costa	Portugal	1 July 2026										

== Honours ==
- Taça de Portugal
  - Runners-up: 2021–22
- Supertaça de Portugal
  - Runners-up: 2022
- Segunda Liga
  - Winners: 2014–15, 2024–25
- Terceira Divisão
  - Winners: 2008–09
- AF Viseu Liga de Honra
  - Winners: 1940–41, 1941–42, 1949–50, 1985–86, 2004–05
- AF Viseu Primeira Divisão
  - Winners: 1951–52, 1963–64, 1972–73
- Taça AF Viseu
  - Winners: 2003–04, 2004–05

== League and cup history ==
Key

- Pos = Final position
- Pld = Matches played
- W = Matches won
- D = Matches drawn
- L = Matches lost
- GF = Goals for
- GA = Goals against
- Pts = Points
- R1 = Round 1
- R2 = Round 2
- R3 = Round 3
- R4 = Round 4
- R5 = Round 5
- R6 = Round 6

Winners	Runners-up	Promoted	Relegated

Seasons

Correct as of the end of the 2020–21 season.

Season	Tier	Domestic League										Cup	League Cup	Viseu Cup	Top scorer	
Season	Tier	League	Division	Pos	Pld	W	D	L	GS	GA	Pts	Cup	League Cup	Viseu Cup	Name	Goals
1999–2000	5	Divisão de Honra		7th	30	13	5	12	54	51	44	—	—			
2000–01	5	Divisão de Honra		3rd	30	19	2	9	57	31	59	—	—			
2001–02	5	Divisão de Honra		3rd	30	15	9	6	59	28	54	—	—			
2002–03	5	Divisão de Honra		5th	30	12	9	9	44	32	45	—	—			
2003–04	5	Divisão de Honra		4th	30	14	10	6	48	27	52	—	—	W		
2004–05	5	Divisão de Honra		1st	30	22	3	5	77	25	69	R1	—	W		
2005–06	4	Terceira Divisão	Série C	7th	34	14	10	10	49	37	52	R3	—	—		
2006–07	4	Terceira Divisão	Série C	7th	28	11	8	9	35	31	41	R1	—	—		
2007–08	4	Terceira Divisão	Série C	9th	26	9	8	8	30	25	35	R1	—	—		
2007–08	4	Terceira Divisão	Play-Off	1st	6	4	1	1	11	3	31	R1	—	—		
2008–09	4	Terceira Divisão	Série C	4th	26	12	7	7	45	32	43	R1	—	—	(Brazil) Beré	24
2008–09	4	Terceira Divisão	Play-Off	1st	10	6	2	2	19	13	42	R1	—	—	(Brazil) Beré	24
2009–10	3	Segunda Divisão	Centro	4th	30	14	6	10	50	28	48	R3	—	—	(Argentina) Piojo	12
2010–11	3	Segunda Divisão	Centro	3rd	30	16	7	7	46	28	55	R2	—	—	(Argentina) Piojo	12
2011–12	3	Segunda Divisão	Centro	1st	30	19	6	5	49	22	63	R2	—	—	(Argentina) Piojo	14
2011–12	3	Segunda Divisão	Play-Off	2nd	4	1	2	1	5	6	5	R2	—	—	(Argentina) Piojo	14
2012–13	2	Segunda Liga		10th	42	16	11	15	55	60	59	R3	R1	—	(Argentina) Piojo	10
2013–14	2	Segunda Liga		9th	42	16	11	15	41	38	59	R3	R1	—	(Portugal) Tozé Marreco	11
2014–15	2	Segunda Liga		1st	46	21	18	7	67	51	81	R4	R2	—	(Portugal) Tozé Marreco	25
2015–16	1	Primeira Liga		16th	34	8	6	20	34	54	30	R4	R2	—	(Brazil) Nathan Júnior	13
2016–17	1	Primeira Liga		16th	34	8	8	18	29	52	32	R5	R2	—	(Venezuela) Jhon Murillo (Brazil) Wagner	5
2017–18	1	Primeira Liga		11th	34	10	8	16	41	50	38	R3	R2	—	(Portugal) Tomané	9
2018–19	1	Primeira Liga		15th	34	9	8	17	40	54	35	R5	R3	—	(Portugal) Tomané	14
2019–20	1	Primeira Liga		14th	34	9	9	16	30	44	36	R5	R2	—	(Brazil) Ronan	5
2020–21	1	Primeira Liga		12th	34	10	6	18	36	57	36	R4	—	—	(Spain) Mario González	15
2021–22	1	Primeira Liga		17th	34	7	7	20	41	67	28	RU	R1	—	(Uruguay) Juan Manuel Boselli	8
