= A.D. Carregado =

Portuguese football club

Carregado
- Full name: Associação Desportiva do Carregado
- Founded: 19 November 1950
- Ground: Campo José Lacerda Pinto Barreiros, Carregado, Alenquer
- Capacity: 1,000
- Chairman: José Aurélio Lameiras
- Manager: Sérgio Ricardo
- League: Portuguese Second Division
- 2012–13: Portuguese Second Division, 14th
- Website: http://www.adcarregado.com/

Associação Desportiva do Carregado, commonly known as just Carregado, is a Portuguese football club based in Carregado, a parish of Alenquer, Lisbon. Founded in 1950, it currently plays in the Portuguese third tier, holding home matches at Campo Lacerda Pinto Barreiros, which holds a capacity of 1,000.

== History ==
Carregado first reached the third division of Portuguese football in 2005.

Four years later, after losing in the playoff semi-final against C.D. Fátima, it benefitted from problems to top flight's C.F. Estrela da Amadora and Boavista F.C. in the second level, in affairs connected with the Apito Dourado scandals, as the Portuguese Football Federation subsequently invited the team to join the second-highest level, making it the first time a club from Alenquer participated in a professional football competition – it was also the only team from the Oeste Subregion in such conditions.

Carregado returned to division three at the end of the 2009–10 season, after finishing 16th and last in the league, with only six wins in 30 games.

== Current squad ==
Note: Flags indicate national team as defined under FIFA eligibility rules; some limited exceptions apply. Players may hold more than one non-FIFA nationality.

No.	Pos.	Nation	Player
1	GK	(Portugal) POR	Hugo Félix
2	DF	(Portugal) POR	Diogo Martins
3	DF	(Portugal) POR	João Pedro
5	DF	(Brazil) BRA	Ramon
6	DF	(Portugal) POR	Tó-Pê
8	DF	(Portugal) POR	Moisão
9	FW	(Portugal) POR	João Lemos
10	MF	(Brazil) BRA	Mário Sérgio
11	MF	(Portugal) POR	Cesário
12	GK	(Portugal) POR	André Trindade

No.	Pos.	Nation	Player
14	FW	(Portugal) POR	Carlos Gomes
15	MF	(Portugal) POR	Tomás Pereira
16	FW	(Portugal) POR	Tiago Rente
17	MF	(Portugal) POR	Pedro Dionísio
19	MF	(Portugal) POR	Marco Baixinho
22	GK	(Cape Verde) CPV	Ernesto
23	DF	(Portugal) POR	Sérgio Nunes
28	DF	(Brazil) BRA	Alan
33	GK	(Brazil) BRA	Thiago Santos
99	FW	(Brazil) BRA	Alexandre Matão

== League and cup history ==
Season		Pos.	Pl.	W	D	L	GS	GA	P	Cup	League Cup	Notes
1994–95	5DS	3	34	–	–	–	–	–	63			
1995–96	5DS	6	34	–	–	–	–	–	52			
1996–97	5DS	3	34	–	–	–	–	–	66			
1997–98	5DS	4	34	17	10	7	53	32	61			
1998–99	5DS	6	34	16	8	10	55	30	56			
1999–00	5DS	4	34	17	6	9	43	29	57			
2000–01	5DS	2	34	22	6	6	81	31	72			Promoted
2001–02	3DS	7	34	13	9	12	46	42	48	Round 3		
2002–03	3DS	9	34	14	6	14	43	44	48			
2003–04	3DS	12	34	13	6	15	51	50	45	Round 1		
2004–05	3DS	5	34	16	9	9	59	44	57	Round 2		
2005–06	3DS	3	34	19	9	6	56	30	66	Round 2		Relegated
2006–07	3DS	2	30	17	8	5	61	35	59	Round 1		Promoted
2007–08	2DS	3	26	12	7	7	30	28	43	Round 4		
2008–09	2DS	1	22	11	5	6	31	18	38	Round 2		Promoted
2009–10	2H	7	30	6	6	18	26	47	24	Round 3	Round 1	Relegated
2010–11	2DS	5	30	14	5	11	47	40	47	Round 4		
2011–12	2DS	4	30	15	8	7	57	38	38	Round 2		
2012–13	2DS	14	30	5	9	16	34	51	24	Round 1		

Last updated: 18 June 2013
2H = Liga de Honra; 2DS/2DN = Segunda Divisão; 3DS = Terceira Divisão; 5DS = Portuguese District Football Associations
Pos. = Position; Pl = Match played; W = Win; D = Draw; L = Lost; GS = Goal scored; GA = Goal against; P = Points
