= Anadia F.C. =

Portuguese association football club

Anadia
- Full name: Anadia Futebol Clube
- Founded: 19 November 1926; 99 years ago
- Ground: Municipal Engº Sílvio Henriques Cerveira; Anadia; Portugal
- Capacity: 6,500
- Chairman: Vasco Oliveira
- Head Coach: Nuno Pedro
- League: Campeonato de Portugal
- Website: anadiafc1926.blogspot.co.uk
Home colours

Anadia Futebol Clube (abbreviated as Anadia FC) is a Portuguese football club based in Anadia in the district of Aveiro. Anadia is also a club for field hockey and basketball.

== Background ==
Anadia FC currently plays in the Campeonato de Portugal which is the third tier of Portuguese football. The club was founded in 1926 and they play their home matches at the Municipal Engº Sílvio Henriques Cerveira in Anadia. The stadium is able to accommodate 6,500 spectators.

The club is affiliated to Associação de Futebol de Aveiro and has competed in the AF Aveiro Taça. The club has also entered the national cup competition known as Taça de Portugal on many occasions.

Anadia lost its president António Simões in a car crash on 20 November 2009. The situation created huge problems in its structure, which it was resolved with a constitution by the Administrative Commission (Comissão Administrativa). He was succeeded by Manuel Pinho.

== Appearances ==
- Second National Level: 2
- Segunda Divisão: 12
- Terceira Divisão: 34

== Current squad ==
As of 27 July 2025

Note: Flags indicate national team as defined under FIFA eligibility rules; some limited exceptions apply. Players may hold more than one non-FIFA nationality.

| No. | Pos. | Nation | Player |
|---|---|---|---|
| 1 | GK | POR | Manuel Gama |
| 3 | DF | POR | Afonso Simão |
| 4 | MF | NGA | Nwankwo Obiora |
| 6 | MF | POR | Diogo Izata |
| 7 | FW | BRA | Peterson |
| 8 | MF | POR | Erivaldo |
| 9 | FW | MAR | Mohcine Nader |
| 10 | FW | POR | Diogo Viana |
| 12 | FW | ANG | Daniel Liberal |
| 13 | GK | POR | Daniel Leitão |
| 16 | MF | GNB | Cláudio Mendes |
| 17 | FW | POR | Moisés Conceição |
| 20 | DF | POR | Miguel Vilela |
| 21 | DF | POR | Alpoim |

| No. | Pos. | Nation | Player |
|---|---|---|---|
| 22 | DF | GNB | Junilson Cá |
| 23 | MF | COL | Jean Sinisterra |
| 25 | DF | POR | Ruca Morgado |
| 26 | DF | POR | Pedro Gaio |
| 28 | FW | POR | Yazalde |
| 33 | GK | BRA | Nataniel Rodrigues |
| 45 | DF | POR | Vítor Bruno |
| 54 | MF | POR | Tiago Antunes |
| 72 | MF | BRA | Rafael Silva |
| 75 | MF | BRA | João Filipe |
| 84 | FW | POR | Bryan Alexandre |
| 88 | MF | BRA | Ulisses |
| 90 | DF | POR | Ruca |
| 99 | GK | POR | Lucas Silva |

== Season to season ==
| Season | Level | Division | Section | Place | Movements |
|---|---|---|---|---|---|
| 1990–91 | Tier 3 | Segunda Divisão | Série Centro | 18th | Relegated |
| 1991–92 | Tier 4 | Terceira Divisão | Série C | 2nd | Promoted |
| 1992–93 | Tier 3 | Segunda Divisão | Série Centro | 18th | Relegated |
| 1993–94 | Tier 4 | Terceira Divisão | Série C | 8th | |
| 1994–95 | Tier 4 | Terceira Divisão | Série C | 7th | |
| 1995–96 | Tier 4 | Terceira Divisão | Série C | 4th | |
| 1996–97 | Tier 4 | Terceira Divisão | Série C | 7th | |
| 1997–98 | Tier 4 | Terceira Divisão | Série C | 8th | |
| 1998–99 | Tier 4 | Terceira Divisão | Série C | 9th | |
| 1999–2000 | Tier 4 | Terceira Divisão | Série C | 12th | |
| 2000–01 | Tier 4 | Terceira Divisão | Série C | 9th | |
| 2001–02 | Tier 4 | Terceira Divisão | Série C | 11th | |
| 2002–03 | Tier 4 | Terceira Divisão | Série C | 14th | |
| 2003–04 | Tier 4 | Terceira Divisão | Série C | 4th | |
| 2004–05 | Tier 4 | Terceira Divisão | Série C | 4th | |
| 2005–06 | Tier 4 | Terceira Divisão | Série C | 8th | |
| 2006–07 | Tier 4 | Terceira Divisão | Série C | 1st | Promoted |
| 2007–08 | Tier 3 | Segunda Divisão | Série C – 1ª Fase | 9th | Relegation Group |
| | Tier 3 | Segunda Divisão | Série C – Sub-Série C1 | 3rd | Relegated |
| 2008–09 | Tier 4 | Terceira Divisão | Série C – 1ª Fase | 6th | Promotion Group |
| | Tier 4 | Terceira Divisão | Série C Fase Final | 3rd | |
| 2009–10 | Tier 4 | Terceira Divisão | Série D – 1ª Fase | 2nd | Promotion Group |
| | Tier 4 | Terceira Divisão | Série D Fase Final | 1st | Promoted |
| 2010–11 | Tier 3 | Segunda Divisão | Série Centro | 11th | |
| 2011–12 | Tier 3 | Segunda Divisão | Série Centro | 10th | |

== League and cup history ==
| Season | I | II | III | IV | V | Pts. | Pl. | W | L | T | GS | GA | Diff. | Portuguese Cup |
|---|---|---|---|---|---|---|---|---|---|---|---|---|---|---|
| 1990–91 | | | | 18 | | | | | | | | | | |
| 1991–92 | | | 2 (C) | | | | | | | | | | | |
| 1992–93 | | | | 18 | | | | | | | | | | |
| 1993–94 | | | 8 (C) | | | 35 pts | 34 | 13 | 9 | 12 | 50 | 43 | 7 | |
| 1994–95 | | | | 7 (C) | | 35 pts | 34 | 11 | 13 | 10 | 51 | 38 | 13 | |
| 1995–96 | | | | 4 (C) | | 57 pts | 34 | 15 | 12 | 7 | 59 | 39 | 20 | |
| 1996–97 | | | | 7 (C) | | | | | | | | | | |
| 1997–98 | | | | 8 (C) | | | | | | | | | | |
| 1998–99 | | | | 9 (C) | | | | | | | | | | |
| 1999–2000 | | | | 12 (C) | | | | | | | | | | |
| 2000–01 | | | | 9 (C) | | | | | | | | | | |
| 2001–02 | | | | 11 (C) | | | | | | | | | | |
| 2002–03 | | | | 14 (C) | | | | | | | | | | |
| 2003–04 | | | | 4 (C) | | | | | | | | | | |
| 2004–05 | | | | 4 (C) | | | | | | | | | | |
| 2005–06 | | | | 8 (C) | | | | | | | | | | |
| 2006–07 | | | | 1 (C) | | | | | | | | | | |
| 2007–08 | | | 9/3 (C) | | | | | | | | | | | |
| 2008–09 | | | | 6/3 (C) | | 40 pts | 36 | 16 | 3 | 7 | 47 | 28 | 19 | Round 1 |
| 2009–10 | | | | 2/1 (D) | | 40 pts | 32 | 17 | 10 | 5 | 53 | 40 | 13 | Round 1 |
| 2010–11 | | | 11 | | | 37 pts | 30 | 10 | 7 | 13 | 32 | 40 | −8 | Round 3 |
| 2011–12 | | | 10 | | | 40 pts | 30 | 1 | 7 | 12 | 45 | 42 | 3 | Round 3 |

== Honours ==
- Terceira Divisão: 2006/07, 2009/10
- AF Aveiro 1ª Divisão: 1969/70
