= Viseu Football Association =

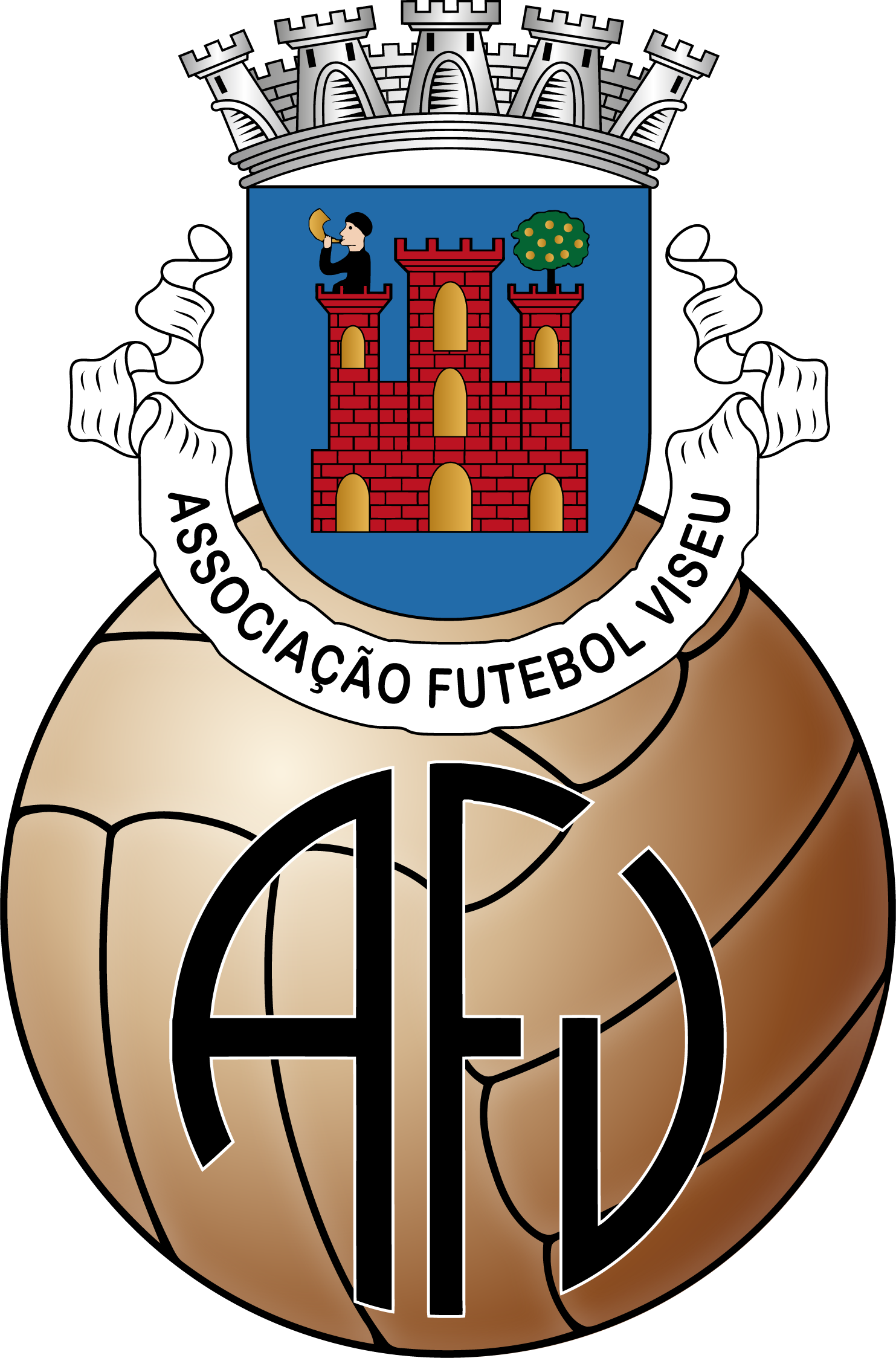
- Founded: 15 October 1926
- Country: Portugal
- Confederation: UEFA
- Number of clubs: 44; 16 (Divisão Honra); 12 (1ª Divisão)''; 16 (2ª Divisão)
- Level on pyramid: 5, 6
- Promotion to: Campeonato de Portugal
- Domestic cup(s): Taça de Portugal; Taça AF Viseu
- Website: afviseu.fpf.pt

The Associação de Futebol de Viseu (Viseu Football Association, abrv. AF Viseu) is the district governing body for all the football competitions in the Portuguese district of Viseu. It is also the regulator of the clubs registered in the district.

== Background ==
Initially called the Federação Desportiva de Viseu, it was officially founded on October 15, 1926.

The founding clubs were:

- Grupo União Futebol
- Sport Lisboa e Viseu
- Lusitano Futebol Clube
- Sporting Clube de Viseu
- Futebol Clube do Porto e Viseu
- Sport Ribeira Viriato
- Clube Académico de Futebol

Several Viseu clubs compete in the national levels of the Portuguese football league system in competitions run by the Portuguese League for Professional Football (Segunda Liga) and Portuguese Football Federation (Campeonato Nacional de Seniores).

Below the Campeonato Nacional de Seniores (Portuguese fourth level) the competitions are organised at a district level (known in Portuguese as Distritais), with each District Association organising its competitions according to geographical and other factors. AF Viseu runs a league competition with two divisions, at the fourth and fifth levels of the Portuguese football league system, two cup competition known as Taça AF Viseu and Taça da Primeira Divisão, and a Supercup between the Taça AF Viseu and the Liga de Honra winners.

AF Viseu currently organises District Championships for football and futsal for or all age groups including Senior, Junior, Youth, Beginners, Infants and Schools.

== Viseu FA clubs in national leagues (2025–26) ==
Currently there are 5 Viseu FA clubs playing in the national leagues (first, second and third levels of the Portuguese football league system).

Liga Portugal

- Académico de Viseu

Liga Portugal 2

- Tondela

Campeonato de Portugal

- Cinfães
- Mortágua
- Castro Daire

== Main Competitions ==
=== Leagues ===
The Divisão de Honra is the first tier of the Viseu Football Association. Between 1927 and 1947, it was a Regional Championship called 1ª Divisão. At the end of each season, the top-finishing team is promoted to the Campeonato de Portugal, and the lowest-ranked teams are relegated to the AF Viseu second tier.

Twenty different teams have won the division title; the most successful is Académico de Viseu, with seventeen wins. The inaugural champion was Lusitano.

The 1ª Divisão is the second tier in the Viseu district division and started in the 1951–52 season. In the past it was divided into two zones that divide the district: Zona Norte (North) and Zona Sul (South). The two winners from each zone played against each other in one play-off to crown the champion. Nowadays it is divided in three zones, the previous two and the new Zona Centro (Center). The final round is contested in a group stage format with the two best teams of each zone plus the two best third-placed teams.

The 2ª Divisão is the third tier of the Viseu Football Association. The first season was 1978–79 and Sernancelhe was the first champion. Following the 2010–11 season, the competition was abolished due to the restructure of the Portuguese football league system. The competition returned for the 2026-27 season, after being inactive for 15 years. 31 clubs have won the league with Nandufe and Sernancelhe having the most titles with 2.

==== List of Champions ====
Season	Divisão de Honra	1ª Divisão	2ª Divisão
Regional Championship (1926–1947)
1926–27	Lusitano (1)		
1927–28	Viseu e Benfica (1)		
1928–29	Lusitano (2)		
1929–30	Académico de Viseu (1)		
1930–31	Lusitano (3)		
1931–32	Lusitano (4)		
1932–33	Lusitano (5)		
1933–34	Viseu e Benfica (2)		
1934–35	Lusitano (6)		
1935–36	Lusitano (7)		
1936–37	Académico de Viseu (2)		
1937–38	Académico de Viseu (3)		
1938–39	Académico de Viseu (4)		
1939–40	Mortágua (1)		
1940–41	Tondela (1)		
1941–42	Tondela (2)		
1942–43	Viseu e Benfica (3)		
1943–44	Viseu e Benfica (4)		
1944–45	Académico de Viseu (5)		
1945–46	Académico de Viseu (6)		
1946–47	Viseu e Benfica (5)		
Viseu Championships (1947–)
1947–48	Académico de Viseu (7)		
1948–49	Viseu e Benfica (6)		
1949–50	Tondela (3)		
1950–51	Académico de Viseu (8)		
1951–52	Académico de Viseu (9)	Tondela (1)	
1952–53	Académico de Viseu (10)	Mortágua (1)	
1953–54	Lusitano (8)	Molelos (1)	
1954–55	Lamego (1)	Carregal do Sal (1)	
1955–56	Mortágua (2)	Mangualde (1)	
1956–57	Académico de Viseu (11)	Santacombadense (1)	
1957–58	Académico de Viseu (12)	Viseu e Benfica (1)	
1958–59	Académico de Viseu (13)	Lamego (1)	
1959–60	Lusitano (9)	Vale de Açores (1)	
1960–61	Académico de Viseu (14)	Vale de Açores (2)	
1961–62	Lamego (2)	Mangualde (2)	
1962–63	Mortágua (3)	Penalva do Castelo (1)	
1963–64	Académico de Viseu (15)	Tondela (2)	
1964–65	Académico de Viseu (16)	Sampedrense (1)	
1965–66	Lamego (3)	Molelos (2)	
1966–67	Lusitano (10)	Viseu e Benfica (2)	
1967–68	Lamego (4)	Canas Senhorim (1)	
1968–69	Penalva Castelo (1)	Besteiros (1)	
1969–70	Moimenta da Beira (1)	Mangualde (3)	
1970–71	Mortágua (4)	Resende (1)	
1971–72	Mangualde (1)	Vouzelenses (1)	
1972–73	Penalva Castelo (2)	Tondela (3)	
1973–74	Lusitano (11)	Viseu e Benfica (3)	
1974–75	Viseu e Benfica (7)	Travanca (1)	
1975–76	Mangualde (2)	Santacombadense (2)	
1976–77	Sampedrense (1)	Oliveira de Frades (1)	
1977–78	Lusitano (12)	Carregal do Sal (2)	
1978–79	Penalva Castelo (3)	Carvalhais (1)	Sernancelhe (1)
1979–80	Oliveira de Frades (1)	Silgueiros (1)	Ferreirós do Dão (1)
1980–81	Carvalhais (1)	Tabuaço (1)	S. João Pesqueira (1)
1981–82	Lamego (5)	Resende (2)	Cambres (1)
1982–83	Santacombadense (1)	Cabanas de Viriato (1)	Nandufe (1)
1983–84	Penalva Castelo (4)	Paivense (1)	Boassas (1)
1984–85	Lamego (6)	Cambres (1)	Pedreles (1)
1985–86	Tondela (4)	Moimenta da Beira (1)	Molelos (1)
1986–87	Lamego (7)	Carregal do Sal (3)	Queiriguenses (1)
1987–88	Mortágua (5)	Sátão (1)	Britiande (1)
1988–89	Cinfães (1)	Resende (3)	Abrunhosense (1)
1989–90	Penalva Castelo (5)	Armamar (1)	Santar (1)
1990–91	Lusitano (13)	Moimenta da Beira (2)	Nespereira (1)
1991–92	Lamego (8)	Canas Senhorim (2)	Campia (1)
1992–93	Nelas (1)	Vale de Açores (3)	Lobanense (1)
1993–94	Souselo (1)	Vouzelenses (2)	Repesenses (1)
1994–95	Cinfães (2)	Parada de Gonta (1)	Ranhados (1)
1995–96	Mangualde (3)	UDC Sul (1)	Travanca (1)
1996–97	Cinfães (3)	Vouzelenses (3)	Canas Santa Maria (1)
1997–98	Nelas (2)	Sátão (2)	Unidos de Resende (1)
1998–99	Vouzelenses (1)	Social Lamas (1)	Vale de Açores (1)
1999–2000	Penalva Castelo (6)	Lusitano (1)	Arguedeira (1)
2000–01	Cambres (1)	Mortágua (2)	Nandufe (2)
2001–02	Cinfães (4)	Castro Daire (1)	Carvalhais (1)
2002–03	Santacombadense (2)	Molelos (3)	GD Sul (1)
2003–04	Nelas (3)	Oliveira do Douro (1)	Riodades (1)
2004–05	Tondela (5)	Santar (1)	Parada (1)
2005–06	Santacombadense (3)	Carvalhais (2)	Pinheiro Lafões (1)
2006–07	Académico de Viseu (17)	Canas Senhorim (3)	Resende (1)
2007–08	Cinfães (5)	Molelos (4)	Silgueiros (1)
2008–09	Mangualde (4)	Carvalhais (3)	Castro Daire (1)
2009–10	Sampedrense (2)	Viseu e Benfica (4)	Sernancelhe (2)
2010–11	Lamego (9)	Castro Daire (2)	Mangualde (1)
2011–12	Mortágua (6)	Mangualde (4)	
2012–13	Lusitano (14)	Ferreira de Aves (1)	
2013–14	Moimenta da Beira (2)	Tarouquense (1)	
2014–15	Oliveira de Frades (2)	Alvite (1)	
2015–16	Moimenta da Beira (3)	Canas Senhorim (4)	
2016–17	Ferreira de Aves (1)	Molelos (5)	
2017–18	Lamego (10)	Tarouquense (2)	
2018–19	Castro Daire (1)	Molelos (6)	
2019–20	Not finished (Note: Due to the COVID-19 pandemic)		
2020–21	Ferreira de Aves (2)	Sampedrense (2)	
2021–22	Mortágua (7)	Vouzelenses (4)	
2022–23	Lamelas (1)	Vale de Açores (4)	
2023–24	Cinfães (6)	Carvalhais (4)	
2024–25	Resende (1)	Vale de Açores (5)	
2025–26	Castro Daire (2)	Molelos (7)	

=== Cups ===
On 1977, to commemorate the 50th anniversary of the Viseu Football Association, one Taça Cinquentenário was created for each division. Sampedrense won the 1ª Divisão by beating Carregal do Sal by 2-0 at Estádio do Fontelo. Oliveira de Frades won the 2º Divisão thrashing Silgueiros by 7-1, at Campo da Neusa, in Campo de Besteiros.

On 16 July 1979, two knockout competitions were established, with both first editions starting in the following season. The first cup, Taça Sócios de Mérito, is still active. As of 2026, 23 clubs have won the cup. The record for the most wins is held by Mangualde with 4. The second cup, Taça Sócios Honorários was terminated in 1999. 6 clubs won the cup with Académico de Viseu winning the first final and being the most decorated club with 12 wins.

==== List of Champions ====
Year	Taça Sócios de Mérito	Taça Sócios Honorários
1979–80	Canas de Senhorim (1)	Académico de Viseu (1)
1980–81	Silgueiros (1)	Académico de Viseu (2)
1981–82	Silgueiros (2)	Académico de Viseu (3)
1982–83	Briosa Pextrafil (1)	Lusitano (1)
1983–84	Penalva Castelo (1)	Viseu e Benfica (1)
1984–85	Oliveira de Frades (1)	Académico de Viseu (4)
1985–86	Lusitano (1)	Mangualde (1)
1986–87	Sernancelhe (1)	Académico de Viseu (5)
1987–88	Mortágua (1)	Lamego (1)
1988–89	Moimenta da Beira (1)	Mangualde (2)
1989–90	Ferreira de Aves (1)	Mangualde (3)
1990–91	Lamego (1)	Not held
1991–92	Lamego (2)	Penalva do Castelo (1)
1992–93	Nelas (1)	Académico de Viseu (6)
1993–94	Sernancelhe (2)	Académico de Viseu (7)
1994–95	Mangualde (1)	Académico de Viseu (8)
1995–96	Lusitano (2)	Académico de Viseu (9)
1996–97	Sernancelhe (3)	Académico de Viseu (10)
1997–98	Ferreira de Aves (2)	Not held
1998–99	Souselo (1)	Académico de Viseu (11)
1999–00	Cambres (1)	Académico de Viseu (12)
2000–01	Santacombadense (1)	
2001–02	Santacombadense (2)	
2002–03	Paivense (1)	
2003–04	Tondela (1)	
2004–05	Tondela (2)	
2005–06	Santacombadense (3)	
2006–07	Cinfães (1)	
2007–08	Mangualde (2)	
2008–09	Mangualde (3)	
2009–10	Sampedrense (2)	
2010–11	Sátão (1)	
2011–12	Mangualde (4)	
2012–13	Castro Daire (1)	
2013–14	Paivense (2)	
2014–15	Carregal do Sal (1)	
2015–16	Penalva Castelo (2)	
2016–17	Lamego (3)	
2017–18	Silgueiros (3)	
2018–19	Ferreira de Aves (3)	
2019–20	Not played (Note: Due to the COVID-19 pandemic)	
2020–21	Not played	
2021–22	Mortágua (2)	
2022–23	Cinfães (2)	
2023–24	Cinfães (3)	
2024–25	Carregal do Sal (2)	
2025–26	Lamelas (1)	

=== Taça 1ª Divisão ===
The Taça 1ª Divisão, created in 2020, is a cup contested by the teams in the 1ª Divisão.

The winners of the first tournament were Sezurense. The current holders are Tarouquense, who defeated Lamego in the 2026 final for their second win, having become the first team to win the cup more than once.

Taça 1ª Divisão finals
Season	Winners	Score	Runners-up	Venue	Ref.
2020–21	Sezurense (1)	3–1 (aet)	Boassas	Estádio Municipal de Moimenta da Beira	
2021–22	Besteiros (1)	1–0 (aet)	Oliveira do Douro	Estádio Municipal de Moimenta da Beira	
2022–23	Tarouquense (1)	4–1	Alvite	Complexo Desportivo de Castro Daire	
2023–24	Vila chã de Sá (1)	2–1	Santar	Complexo Desportivo de Castro Daire	
2024–25	Travanca (1)	1–0	Paivense	Complexo Desportivo de Castro Daire	
2025–26	Tarouquense (2)	1–1 (8–7 pen.)	Lamego	Estádio Municipal de Fornelos	

=== Supertaça AF Viseu ===
The Supertaça AF Viseu, created in 2011, is a match contested by the champions of the previous Divisão de Honra season and the holders of Taça AF Viseu.

The winners of the first tournament were Sátão. The current holders are Lamelas, who defeated Castro Daire in 2026 for their record third win.

Supertaça AF Viseu finals
Year	Winners	Score	Runners-up	Venue	Ref.
2011	Sátão (1)	1–0	Lamego	Estádio do Fontelo	
2012	Mortágua (1)	1–0	Mangualde	Estádio do Fontelo	
2013	Lusitano (1)	2–1	Castro Daire	Estádio do Fontelo	
2014	Moimenta da Beira (1)	2–1 (aet)	Paivense	Estádio do Fontelo	
2015	Oliveira de Frades (1)	5–0	Carregal do Sal	Estádio do Fontelo	
2016	Penalva Castelo (1)	4–3 (aet)	Moimenta da Beira	Estádio do Fontelo	
2017	Ferreira de Aves (1)	2–1	Lamego	Estádio do Fontelo	
2018	Silgueiros (1)	3–1	Lamego	Estádio do Fontelo	
2019	Castro Daire (1)	3–1	Ferreira de Aves	Estádio do Fontelo	
2020	Not played (Note: Due to the COVID-19 pandemic)				
2021	Not played				
2022	Lamelas (1)	2–1	Mortágua	Campo 1º de Maio	
2023	Lamelas (2)	1–0	Cinfães	Estádio do Fontelo	
2024	Resende (1)	1–1 (3–2 pen.)	Cinfães	Estádio do Fontelo	
2025	Resende (2)	4–3 (aet)	Carregal do Sal	Estádio do Fontelo	
2026	Lamelas (3)	2–2 (6–5 pen.)	Castro Daire	Estádio Municipal da Pedreira	

== Performances ==
=== Clubs ===
Below is listed every team to have won any domestic competitions organized by AF Viseu.

Bold denotes club with the most number of trophies in specified category.

#	Club	Trophies							
#	Club	DH	1D	2D	TSM	TSH	T1D	ST	Total
1	Académico Viseu	**17**				**12**			29
2	Lusitano	14	1		2	1		1	19
3	Mangualde	4	4	1	**4**	3			16
4	Lamego	10	1		3	1			15
5	Viseu e Benfica	7	4			1			12
5	Mortágua	7	2		2			1	12
7	Penalva Castelo	6	1		2	1		1	11
7	Tondela	5	3		2				10
9	Cinfães	6			3				9
10	Santacombadense	3	2		3				8
10	Molelos		**7**	1					8
12	Moimenta da Beira	3	2		1			1	7
12	Castro Daire	2	2	1	1			1	7
12	Ferreira de Aves	2	1		3			1	7
12	Resende	1	3	1				**2**	7
16	Carvalhais	1	4	1					6
16	Vale de Açores		5	1					6
16	Silgueiros		1	1	3			1	6
19	Sampedrense	2	2		1				5
19	Oliveira de Frades	2	1		1			1	5
19	Vouzelenses	1	4						5
19	Lamelas	1			1			**3**	5
19	Canas Senhorim		4		1				5
19	Carregal do Sal		3		2				5
19	Sernancelhe			**2**	3				5
26	Nelas	3			1				4
26	Cambres	1	1	1	1				4
26	Sátão		2		1			1	4
26	Tarouquense		2				**2**		4
30	Paivense		1		2				3
30	Travanca		1	1			1		3
32	Souselo	1			1				2
32	Santar		1	1					2
32	Besteiros		1				1		2
32	Nandufe			**2**					2
36	Armamar		1						1
36	Parada de Gonta		1						1
36	Cabanas de Viriato		1						1
36	UDC Sul		1						1
36	Social Lamas		1						1
36	Oliveira do Douro		1						1
36	Alvite		1						1
36	Tabuaço		1						1
36	Unidos Resende			1					1
36	Ferreirós do Dão			1					1
36	S. João Pesqueira			1					1
36	Boassas			1					1
36	Pedreles			1					1
36	Queiriguenses			1					1
36	Britiande			1					1
36	Campia			1					1
36	Lobanense			1					1
36	Repesenses			1					1
36	Ranhados			1					1
36	Canas Santa Maria			1					1
36	Arguedeira			1					1
36	GD Sul			1					1
36	Riodades			1					1
36	Parada Ester			1					1
36	Pinheiro Lafões			1					1
36	Nespereira			1					1
36	Abrunhosense			1					1
36	Briosa Pextrafil				1				1
36	Sezurense						1		1
36	Vila Chã de Sá						1		1

=== Total titles won by council ===
City	Number of titles	Clubs
Viseu	59	Lusitano (18), Académico de Viseu (17), Viseu e Benfica (11), Silgueiros (6), Travanca (3), Ranhados (1), Repesenses (1), Briosa Pextrafil (1), Vila Chã de Sá (1)
Tondela	26	Tondela (10), Molelos (8), Besteiros (2), Nandufe (2), Lobanense (1) Parada de Gonta (1), Canas Santa Maria (1), Ferreirós do Dão (1)
Lamego	19	Lamego (14), Cambres (4), Britiande (1)
Mortágua	18	Mortágua (12), Vale de Açores (6)
Mangualde	15	Mangualde (13), Pedreles (1), Abrunhosense (1)
São Pedro do Sul	14	Sampedrense (6), Carvalhais (6), GD Sul (1), UDC Sul (1)
Cinfães	14	Cinfães (9), Souselo (2), Boassas (1), Oliveira do Douro (13), Nespereira (1)
Castro Daire	12	Castro Daire (7), Lamelas (5), Parada Ester (1), Social Lamas (1)
Nelas	11	Nelas (4), Canas de Senhorim (5), Santar (2)
Sátão	11	Ferreira de Aves (7), Sátão (4)
Penalva do Castelo	11	Penalva do Castelo (10), Sezurense (1)
Moimenta da Beira	8	Moimenta da Beira (7), Alvite (1)
Santa Comba Dão	8	Santacombadense (8)
Oliveira de Frades	7	Oliveira de Frades (5), Campia (1), Pinheiro Lafões (1)
Resende	7	Resende (6), Unidos Resende (1)
Carregal do Sal	6	Carregal do Sal (5), Cabanas de Viriato (1)
Sernancelhe	5	Sernancelhe (5)
Vouzela	5	Vouzelenses (5)
Tarouca	5	Tarouquense (4), Arguedeira (1)
Vila Nova de Paiva	4	Paivense (3), Queiriguenses (1)
São João da Pesqueira	2	S. João Pesqueira (1), Riodades (1)
Armamar	1	Armamar (1)
Tabuaço	1	Tabuaço (1)

== Former clubs ==
The former member clubs of the AF Viseu are football clubs who lost their status in the by resigning, by becoming defunct, merging with another club, or expulsion.

Club	Founded	Last season	Council	Current status	Ref(s)
Grupo Desportivo de Abraveses	18 December 1962	2010–11	Viseu	Defunct	
Vitória Futebol Clube de Abraveses	1 January 1927		Viseu	Defunct	
Centro Recreativo e Desportivo Abrunhosense	1 November 1969	1989–90	Mangualde	Defunct	
Grupo Desportivo de Canas de Santa Maria	1 December 1938	2011–12	Tondela	Defunct	
Grupo Desportivo da Freguesia de Caparrosa	1 January 2000	2008–09	Tondela	Defunct	
Clube Desportivo Recreativo Serra Caramulo	25 March 1983	1999–2000	Tondela	Defunct	
Grupo Desportivo Farminhão	1 June 2005	2010–11	Viseu	Defunct	
Grupo Desportivo Ferreirós Dão	27 July 1930	2005–06	Tondela	Defunct	
Associação Recreativa e Desportiva de Fiais da Telha	23 April 1977	2006–07	Carregal do Sal	Defunct	
Casa do Povo de Lajeosa do Dão	2 June 1973	2015–16	Tondela	Defunct	
Clube Desportivo de Leomil	1 January 1983	2008–09	Viseu	Defunct	
Clube Cruz Maltina Lobanense	1 January 1936	2008–09	Tondela	Defunct	
Associação Desportiva Recreativa e Cultural de Parada de Gonta	1986	2009–10	Tondela	Defunct	
Associacao Cultural Recreativa Pinheiro de Lafões	1 January 1979	2010–11	Oliveira de Frades	Defunct	
Associação Cultural Recreativa e Desportiva de Riodades	1 January 1982	2008–09	São João da Pesqueira	Defunct.	
Casa do Povo de Santiago de Besteiros		2007–08	Tondela	Defunct. A new club, formed as Novo Capítulo Clube in 2008, was defunct in 2010.	
Associação de Solidariedade Social Recreativa e Desportiva da Freguesia de São Miguel do Outeiro		2001–02	Tondela	Defunct	
Clube Recreativo de Tonda	1946	2004–05	Tondela	Defunct	
Centro Social do Tourigo	13 January 1993	2001–02	Tondela	Defunct	
Grupo Desportivo Treixedense	24 January 1976		Santa Comba Dão	Defunct	
Associação Desportiva Cultural Recreativa Vilar de Besteiros	25 January 1978	2011–12	Tondela	Defunct	

== See also ==
- Taça AF Viseu
- Portuguese District Football Associations
- Portuguese football competitions
- List of football clubs in Portugal
