= Piojo (footballer, born 1985) =

Argentine footballer

Personal information
- Full name: Cristian Edgardo Amado
- Date of birth: 7 June 1985 (age 41)
- Place of birth: Puerto Iguazú, Argentina
- Height: 1.83 m (6 ft 0 in)
- Position: Striker

Youth career
- CP Crecer

Senior career*
Years	Team	Apps	(Gls)
2004–2006	Portimonense	20	(3)
2006	→ Silves (loan)	14	(5)
2006	Atlético	0	(0)
2006–2007	Imortal	15	(3)
2007–2008	Benfica Castelo Branco	15	(5)
2008–2016	Tondela	224	(69)
Total		288	(85)
- * Club domestic league appearances and goals

Cristian Edgardo Amado (born 7 June 1985), known as Piojo, is an Argentine former footballer who played as a striker.

He played professionally in Portugal, notably appearing for Tondela in all four major levels.

== Club career ==
Born in Puerto Iguazú, Misiones Province, Piojo spent his entire professional career in Portugal, starting out at Portimonense S.C. in the Segunda Liga in 2004. He went on to represent Silves FC, Atlético Clube de Portugal, Imortal DC, Sport Benfica e Castelo Branco and C.D. Tondela, achieving promotion to the Primeira Liga with the latter club at the end of the 2014–15 season and contributing 33 games and ten goals to the feat.

Piojo made his top-division debut on 23 August 2015, playing roughly 30 minutes in a 1–0 away loss against Boavista FC. He scored his only goal on 9 November, in the 2–1 defeat at C.F. Os Belenenses. The following June, having appeared sparingly as his team retained their status, the 31-year-old was released with 250 competitive appearances and 81 goals to his credit, only trailing Cláudio Ramos in an all-time list.

== Honours ==
Tondela

- Segunda Liga: 2014–15
- Terceira Divisão: 2008–09
