= S.L. Nelas =

Portuguese football club

Nelas
- Full name: Sport Lisboa e Nelas
- Founded: 25 August 1939; 86 years ago
- Ground: Estádio Municipal de Nelas, Nelas
- Capacity: 2,750
- Chairman: Abel Ferreira
- Manager: Jorge Ribeiro
- League: AF Viseu South Division
- 2011-12: 5th

Sport Lisboa e Nelas is a Portuguese football club located in the village of Nelas, Viseu. The club was founded on 25 August 1939. It is a branch club of both Benfica and Sporting CP. Nelas play at the Estádio Municipal de Nelas which holds a capacity of 2,750. The currently play in the AF Viseu South Division. The club's most recent season saw them finish fifth in the AF Viseu South Division.
