= S.C. Lamego =

Portuguese football club

Lamego
- Full name: Sporting Clube de Lamego
- Founded: 1934
- Ground: Estádio dos Remédios; Lamego; Portugal
- Capacity: 3,500
- Chairman: Filipe Ribeiro
- League: Terceira Divisão Série B
Home colours

Sporting Clube de Lamego (abbreviated as SC Lamego, Sporting de Lamego or Sp. Lamego) is a Portuguese football club based in Lamego in the district of Viseu. SC Lamego currently plays in the Terceira Divisão Série B which is the fourth tier of Portuguese football. The club was founded in 1934 and they play their home matches at the Estádio dos Remédios in Lamego. The stadium is able to accommodate 3,500 spectators.

== History ==
The club was established on 4 June 1934 as the branch number 63 of Sporting Clube de Portugal (Sporting CP). The club, which is affiliated to Associação de Futebol de Viseu, has competed in the AF Viseu Taça. The club has also entered the national cup competition known as Taça de Portugal on numerous occasions.

== Season to season ==
Season	Level	Division	Section	Place	Movements
1990–91	Tier 5	Distritais	AF Viseu – 1ª Divisão		
1991–92	Tier 5	Distritais	AF Viseu – 1ª Divisão		Promoted
1992–93	Tier 4	Terceira Divisão	Série B	3rd	
1993–94	Tier 4	Terceira Divisão	Série B	5th	
1994–95	Tier 4	Terceira Divisão	Série B	1st	Promoted
1995–96	Tier 3	Segunda Divisão	Série Norte	12th	
1996–97	Tier 3	Segunda Divisão	Série Norte	16th	Relegated
1997–98	Tier 4	Terceira Divisão	Série B	4th	
1998–99	Tier 4	Terceira Divisão	Série B	10th	
1999–2000	Tier 4	Terceira Divisão	Série B	9th	
2000–01	Tier 4	Terceira Divisão	Série B	8th	
2001–02	Tier 4	Terceira Divisão	Série B	6th	
2002–03	Tier 4	Terceira Divisão	Série B	15th	Relegated
2003–04	Tier 5	Distritais	AF Viseu – 1ª Divisão	4th	
2004–05	Tier 5	Distritais	AF Viseu – 1ª Divisão	10th	
2005–06	Tier 5	Distritais	AF Viseu – 1ª Divisão	3rd	
2006–07	Tier 5	Distritais	AF Viseu – Honra	2nd	
2007–08	Tier 5	Distritais	AF Viseu – Honra	3rd	
2008–09	Tier 5	Distritais	AF Viseu – Honra	13th	
2009–10	Tier 5	Distritais	AF Viseu – Honra	6th	
2010–11	Tier 5	Distritais	AF Viseu – Honra	1st	Promoted
2011–12	Tier 4	Terceira Divisão	Série B – 1ª Fase	12th	Relegation Group
	Tier 4	Terceira Divisão	Série B Últimos	5th	Relegated

== League and cup history ==
Season	I	II	III	IV	V	Pts.	Pl.	W	T	L	GS	GA	Diff.	
1969–70			4			36 pts	30	14	8	8	56	31	+25	
1991–92														
1992–93				3										
1993–94				5										
1994–95				1		50 pts	34	19	12	3	49	20	29	
1995–96			12			45 pts	34	12	9	13	36	31	+5	
1996–97			16	...			...	...	...	...	...	...	...	...
1997–98				4		61 pts	34	18	7	9	52	32	+20	
1998–99				10		42 pts	34	10	12	12	45	43	+2	
1999–2000				9										
2000–01				8										
2001–02				6										
2002–03				15										
2003–04					4									
2004–05					10									
2005–06					3	57 pts	30	17	6	7	48	26	+22	
2006–07					2	65 pts	30	20	5	5	56	29	+27	
2007–08					3	52 pts	30	16	4	10	58	35	+23	
2008–09					13	36 pts	30	9	9	12	23	44	−21	
2009–10					6	...	...	...	...	...	...	...	...	
2010–11					1									
2011–12				12 [5]										

== Honours ==
- AF Viseu Divisão Honra: 1954/55, 1961/62, 1965/66, 1967/68, 1981/82, 1984/85, 1986/87, 1991/92, 2010/11
- AF Viseu 1ª Divisão: 1958/59
- AF Viseu Taça: 1990/91, 1991/92
