= F.C. da Madalena =

Portuguese football club

Madalena
- Full name: Futebol Clube da Madalena
- Founded: 1974
- Ground: Estádio Municipal da Madalena
- Capacity: 2,500
- Chairman: (Portugal) Mário Nogueira de Castro
- Manager: (Portugal) Joaquim Mendes
- League: Terceira Divisão
- 2011–12: Segunda Divisão – Zona Centro, 16th (relegated)

Futebol Clube da Madalena or simply Madalena is a Portuguese football club based in Madalena. The club was founded in 1974. The team holds two Serie Azores championship titles, one for 2004–2005 and one for 2009–2010.

== Current squad ==
Note: Flags indicate national team as defined under FIFA eligibility rules; some limited exceptions apply. Players may hold more than one non-FIFA nationality.

No. / Pos. / Nation / Player	No. / Pos. / Nation / Player
