= C.F. Benfica =

Portuguese sports club

Coordinates: 38°44′57.15″N 9°12′25.35″W

Futebol Benfica
- Full name: Clube Futebol Benfica
- Nickname: Fofó
- Founded: 23 March 1933; 93 years ago
- Ground: Estádio Francisco Lázaro, Benfica, Lisbon, Portugal
- Capacity: 1,500
- President: Vasco Fernandes
- Manager: Pedro Barroca
- League: Campeonato Nacional
- 2013–14: Série G, 8th (relegated)
- Website: http://www.futebolbenfica.com/
Home colours	Away colours

Clube Futebol Benfica (Portuguese pronunciation: [bɐ̃jˈfikɐ]), commonly known as Futebol Benfica or simply as Fofó (Portuguese pronunciation: [fɔˈfɔ]), is a Portuguese sports club based in the Benfica neighborhood of Lisbon. The club was founded on 23 March 1933; however, the origins of the club can be traced back to 1895. Futebol Benfica is mostly known for its men's football, women's football, field hockey and roller hockey teams.

The men's football team competes in the Regional league. Previously it competed in the newly created Campeonato Nacional de Seniores, a competition created in 2013 after the merging of the Segunda Divisão and Terceira Divisão (third and fourth tiers of the Portuguese football league system).

The women's football team plays in the national top league, the Campeonato Nacional. Both teams play at the Estádio Francisco Lázaro, where they have been playing ever since the establishment of the club. The home colours are red and black.

Futebol Benfica is an independent club without any affiliation or connection with the better-known Sport Lisboa e Benfica, a neighboring club of much larger dimensions.

== History ==
The existence stretches back to around 1895, as the sports division of a philharmonic society in the parish of Benfica in Lisbon, adopting the name "Foot-Ball de Bemfica" in 1911. It was reorganized as an autonomous club on 23 March 1933. Futebol Benfica has won several national titles, principally in roller hockey and field hockey.

Their pitch is Estádio Francisco Lázaro, on Rua Olivério Serpa, in the parish of Benfica in Lisbon. It is named in honor of the Portuguese athlete, Francisco Lázaro, who died while running in the marathon at the 1912 Summer Olympics in Stockholm.

The club has 3,500 members and approximately 1150 athletes distributed through various sports, including football, women's football, athletics, field hockey, indoor hockey, gymnastics and swimming.

In the 2011–12 season, Futebol Benfica men's football team was promoted to the Segunda Divisão of the Portuguese football after winning the Serie E of the Terceira Divisão, having achieved one of the best results in recent years.

In the 2014–15 season, Futebol Benfica's women's football team won both the Portuguese national women's football league and the Portuguese women's football cup, and went on to also take the first women's supercup. It won both the national championship and cup again in 2015–16.

== Season to season ==
Season	Division	Section	Place	Notes
1994–95	Regional	AF Lisboa – 1st Division of Honour	1st	Promoted
1995–96	3rd	Série E	10th	
1996–97	3rd	Série E	11th	
1997–98	3rd	Série E	13th	
1998–99	3rd	Série E	13th	
1999–2000	3rd	Série E	10th	
2000–01	3rd	Série F	12th	
2001–02	3rd	Série E	12th	
2002–03	3rd	Série F	16th	Relegated
2003–04	Regional	AF Lisboa – 1st Division of Honour	3rd	
2004–05	Regional	AF Lisboa – 1st Division of Honour	1st	Promoted
2005–06	3rd	Série F	15th	Relegated
2006–07	Regional	AF Lisboa – 1st Division of Honour	2nd	
2007–08	Regional	AF Lisboa – 1st Division of Honour	2nd	Promoted
2008–09	3rd	Série E	10th	Relegated
2009–10	Regional	AF Lisboa – 1st Division of Honour	8th	
2010–11	Regional	AF Lisboa – 1st Division of Honour	2nd	Promoted
2011–12	3rd	Série E	1st	Promoted
2012–13	2nd B	Zona Sul	13th	
2013–14	CN	Série G	8th	Relegated
2014–15	Regional	AF Lisboa – 1st Division of Honour		

== Notable players ==
- (Portugal) Paulo Bento

== Honours ==
=== Football ===
- Terceira Divisão
  - Winner of Serie E: 2011–12
- AF Lisboa (Regional Leagues)
  - First Division of Honour (2): 1994–95, 2004–05
  - First Division: 1986–87
  - Second Division: 1977–78

=== Women's football ===
- Portuguese Women's national league
  - Champions (2): 2014–15, 2015–16
- Portuguese Women's Football Cup
  - Champions (2): 2014–15, 2015–16.
  - Runners-up: 2010–11, 2013–14
- Supertaça de Portugal de Futebol Feminino
  - Champions: 2014–15
  - Runners-up: 2015–16

=== Field Hockey ===
- Portuguese Field Hockey Championship (8): 1941–42, 1942–43, 1950–51, 1953–54, 1955–56, 1956–57, 1958–59, 1978–79

=== Roller Hockey ===
- Portuguese Roller Hockey First Division (3): 1939–40, 1940–41, 1942–43
