= G.D. Mangualde =

Portuguese sports club

- Full name: Grupo Desportivo Mangualde
- Founded: 1945
- Ground: Estádio Municipal de Mangualde, Mangualde
- Capacity: 1500
- League: Honra AF Viseu
- 2019–20: 12th

Grupo Desportivo Mangualde is a Portuguese sports club from Mangualde.

The men's football team played in the Honra AF Viseu. The team played in the second tier until the 1989–90 Segunda Divisão, being transferred to the new third tier 1990–91 Segunda Divisão B, whence it was relegated. A later promotion to the 1997–98 Segunda Divisão B was followed by relegation again, and a Terceira Divisão stint from 1998 to 2004.
