= C.D. Cinfães =

Portuguese sports club

- Full name: Clube Desportivo de Cinfães
- Founded: 1931{ ground = Estádio Municipal Cerveira Pinto, Cinfães
- Capacity: 4000
- Manager: Pedro Hipólito

Clube Desportivo de Cinfães is a Portuguese sports club from Cinfães, Viseu District.

The men's football team played on the third tier until being relegated from the 2018–19 Campeonato de Portugal, and plays regularly in the Taça de Portugal. The team notably reached the fifth round of the 2008–09 Taça de Portugal.
