= C.D. Estarreja =

Portuguese association football club

Estarreja
- Full name: Clube Desportivo de Estarreja
- Ground: Dr. Tavares da Silva
- Capacity: 2,000
- Chairman: Pedro Mendes
- Coach: Magno Grave

Clube Desportivo de Estarreja is a Portuguese club founded in 1944 and located in Estarreja.

== History ==
The club was founded in November 11 of 1944. The club the most number of presences in the District Championship of Aveiro. However, has already competed in the third-level of Portuguese football.
