= S.C. Penalva do Castelo =

Portuguese sports club

- Full name: Sport Clube de Penalva do Castelo
- Founded: 1945
- Ground: Parque Desportivo de Sant´Ana, Penalva do Castelo
- Capacity: 4000
- League: Honra AF Viseu
- 2020–21: 8th

Sport Clube de Penalva do Castelo is a Portuguese sports club from Penalva do Castelo, Viseu District.

The men's football team played on the third tier until being relegated from the 2018–19 Campeonato de Portugal. The team notably reached the 2006–07 Taça de Portugal fifth round, later the 2012–13 Taça de Portugal fourth round.
