= 2016–17 Taça de Portugal =

Taça de Portugal Placard

Tournament details
- Country: Portugal
- Dates: 3 September 2016 – 28 May 2017
- Teams: 155

Final positions
- Champions: Benfica (26th title)
- Runners-up: Vitória de Guimarães

Tournament statistics
- Matches played: 171
- Goals scored: 498 (2.91 per match)
- Top goal scorer(s): (Greece) Kostas Mitroglou (9 goals)

The 2016–17 Taça de Portugal was the 77th season of the Taça de Portugal, the premier knockout competition in Portuguese football. It was also known as Taça de Portugal Placard due to sponsorship by sports betting game Placard.

The competition was contested by a total of 155 clubs, including teams from the top-three tiers of the Portuguese football league system (Note: Reserve or B teams are not eligible to participate.) and representatives of the fourth-tier District leagues and cups. It began with the first-round matches on 3 September 2016 and concluded on 28 May 2017, with the final at the Estádio Nacional in Oeiras.

The title holders were Braga, who won the competition for the second time after beating Porto in the previous final, but were eliminated in the fifth round by Sporting da Covilhã.

== Format ==
As in the previous season, the competition format is organised in a knockout system consisting of seven rounds before the final match. The concept of repechage introduced in the previous edition was kept, meaning that teams eliminated in one round could still compete in later rounds, to provide an even number of teams necessary to avoid byes.

A total of 120 teams entered the tournament in the first round, 79 competing in the third-tier Campeonato de Portugal and 41 representatives from the District Football Associations. In the second round, the previous round winners will be joined by the 17 teams competing in the second-tier LigaPro. In the third round, the 18 top-tier Primeira Liga teams will enter the competition for the first time, playing against the 46 winners of the second round. In both second and third rounds, teams from higher tiers will play away against teams from lower tiers; after the third round, the draw will have no restrictions.

Unlike the earlier one-legged rounds, the semi-finals will be played as two-legged ties, with home and away matches. The final will be played as a one-off match at a neutral venue, traditionally the Estádio Nacional in Oeiras.

Round	Teams remaining	Teams involved	Teams from the previous round	New teams in this round	Leagues entering in this round (tier level)
First round	155	120	none	120	Campeonato de Portugal (3rd); District Football Associations (4th)
Second round	110	92	60+15	17	LigaPro (2nd)
Third round	64	64	46	18	Primeira Liga (1st)
Fourth round	32	32	32	none	none
Fifth round	16	16	16	none	none
Quarter-finals	8	8	8	none	none
Semi-finals	4	4	4	none	none
Final	2	2	2	none	none

== Teams ==
A total of 155 teams competing in the top-four tiers of Portuguese football plus the winners (or losing finalists) of the District Football Association Cups were considered eligible by the Portuguese Football Federation to participate in the competition:

2016–17 Taça de Portugal teams
Primeira Liga (18 teams)

- Arouca
- Belenenses
- Benfica
- Boavista
- Braga
- Chaves
- Estoril
- Feirense
- Marítimo
- Moreirense
- Nacional
- Paços de Ferreira
- Porto
- Rio Ave
- Sporting CP
- Tondela
- Vitória de Guimarães
- Vitória de Setúbal

LigaPro (17 teams)

- Académica
- Académico de Viseu
- Cova da Piedade
- Desportivo das Aves
- Fafe
- Famalicão
- Freamunde
- Gil Vicente
- Leixões
- Olhanense
- Penafiel
- Portimonense
- Santa Clara
- Sporting da Covilhã
- União da Madeira
- Varzim
- Vizela

Campeonato de Portugal (79 teams)

Series A (10 teams)

- AD Oliveirense
- Bragança
- Limianos
- Merelinense
- Mirandela
- Montalegre
- Pedras Salgadas
- Ponte da Barca
- Torcatense
- Vilaverdense

Series B (9 teams) (Note: Marítimo B, a reserve team which plays in the Series B, are ineligible to play in the competition.)

- Aliança de Gandra
- Amarante
- Camacha
- Caniçal
- Felgueiras 1932
- Pedras Rubras
- São Martinho
- Torre de Moncorvo
- Trofense

Series C (10 teams)

- Cesarense
- Cinfães
- Coimbrões
- Estarreja
- Gondomar
- Moimenta da Beira
- Oliveirense
- Salgueiros
- Sanjoanense
- Sousense

Series D (10 teams)

- Académica – SF (Note: Not to be confused with Associação Académica de Coimbra – O.A.F. (from LigaPro).)
- AD Nogueirense
- Anadia
- Gafanha
- Gouveia
- Lusitano de Vildemoinhos
- Mortágua
- Pampilhosa
- Recreio de Águeda
- Tourizense

Series E (10 teams)

- Benfica e Castelo Branco
- Carapinheirense
- Fátima
- Naval 1º de Maio
- Oleiros
- Operário
- Sertanense
- Sporting Ideal
- União de Leiria
- Vitória de Sernache

Series F (10 teams)

- Alcanenense
- Angrense
- Caldas
- Gafetense
- Ginásio de Alcobaça
- Lusitânia
- Mafra
- Praiense
- Torreense
- Vilafranquense

Series G (10 teams)

- 1º de Dezembro
- Atlético CP
- Atlético da Malveira
- Barreirense
- Casa Pia
- Loures
- Oriental
- Real
- Sacavenense
- Sintrense

Series H (10 teams)

- Almancilense
- Armacenenses
- Fabril do Barreiro
- Farense
- Louletano
- Lusitano VRSA
- Mineiro Aljustrelense
- Moura
- Pinhalnovense
- Sporting de Viana do Alentejo

District Football Associations (41 teams)
- Algarve FA: Quarteirense (2nd) & Lagoa (3rd)
- Angra do Heroísmo FA: None
- Aveiro FA: Beira-Mar (CW) & Sporting de Espinho (2nd)
- Beja FA: Praia de Milfontes (2nd) (Note: Piense, the cup runners-up, declined to participate.)
- Braga FA: Joane (CR), Santa Eulália (2nd) & Maria da Fonte (3rd)
- Bragança FA: Sendim (CW) & Águia de Vimioso (1st)
- Castelo Branco FA: Alcains (3rd) & Académico do Fundão (4th) (Note: Sporting da Covilhã B, the league champions and cup runners-up, are a reserve team, therefore ineligible to play in the competition.)
- Coimbra FA: Vinha da Rainha (CR) & Sourense (2nd)
- Évora FA: Lusitano de Évora (CW) & Redondense (2nd)
- Guarda FA: Aguiar da Beira (CW) & Trancoso (2nd)
- Horta FA: Flamengos (CW)
- Leiria FA: Beneditense (CW) & Marinhense (2nd)
- Lisboa FA: Santa Iria (CW) & Sporting de Lourel (CR)
- Madeira FA: Cruzado Canicense (CW)
- Ponta Delgada FA: None (Note: Both cup winners, Santa Clara and cup runners-up, Sporting Ideal, were qualified as they compete in the top-three tiers of Portuguese football.)
- Portalegre FA: Mosteirense (CW) & Gavionenses (CR)
- Porto FA: Barrosas (CW), Raimonda (CR) & Valadares Gaia (2nd)
- Santarém FA: Fazendense (CW) & Cartaxo (2nd)
- Setúbal FA: Amora (CW) & Beira-Mar de Almada (CR)
- Viana do Castelo FA: Atlético dos Arcos (CW) & Cerveira (2nd)
- Vila Real FA: Cerva (CW) & Vilar de Perdizes (2nd)
- Viseu FA: Penalva do Castelo (CW) & Sátão (2nd)
- Azores League: Rabo de Peixe (2nd) & São Roque (Açores) (7th)

CW – Cup winners; CR – Cup runners-up; nth – League spot.

== Schedule ==
All draws are held at the FPF headquarters at Cidade do Futebol, in Oeiras. Match kick-off times are in WET (UTC+0) from the fourth round to the semi-finals, and in WEST (UTC+1) during the rest of the competition.

Round	Draw date	Main date(s)	Fixtures	Teams	Prize money
First round	10 August 2016	4 September 2016	60	155 → 110	€2,000
Second round	8 September 2016	25 September 2016	46	110 → 64	€3,000
Third round	29 September 2016	16 October 2016	32	64 → 32	€4,000
Fourth round	21 October 2016	20 November 2016	16	32 → 16	€5,000
Fifth round	24 November 2016	13–15 December 2015	8	16 → 8	€7,500
Quarter-finals	20 December 2016	17–19 January 2017	4	8 → 4	€10,000
Semi-finals	20 December 2016	1 March 2017 (1st leg); 5 April 2017 (2nd leg)	4	4 → 2	€15,000
Final	20 December 2016	28 May 2017	1	2 → 1	€300,000 (winner) €150,000 (runner-up)

== First round ==
A total of 120 teams from the Campeonato de Portugal (CP) and the District Football Associations (D) entered the first round. The draw took place on Wednesday, 10 August 2016, at 15:00 WEST. The teams were divided into eight groups of 14 or 16 teams according to geographic criteria. Matches were played on 3 and 4 September 2016.

Number of teams per tier entering this round
Primeira Liga	LigaPro	Campeonato de Portugal	District FAs	Total
18 / 18	17 / 17	79 / 79	41 / 41	155 / 155

Fixtures

Series A

- Pedras Salgadas (CP) 1–0 Bragança (CP)
- Merelinense (CP) 3–0 Cerveira (D)
- Vilar de Perdizes (D) 0–3 Vilaverdense (CP) (Note: Vilar de Perdizes played their home match at Estádio Dr. Diogo Alves Vaz Pereira, Montalegre, instead of their regular stadium Campo da Lage, Vilar de Perdizes (Montalegre).)
- Ponte da Barca (CP) 1–0 Montalegre (CP)
- Mirandela (CP) 2–2 (a.e.t.) (2–3 p) Maria da Fonte (D)
- Atlético dos Arcos (D) 1–0 (a.e.t.) Torcatense (CP)
- Águia de Vimioso (D) 1–5 Limianos (CP)

Series B

- Cerva (D) 0–2 Amarante (CP) (Note: Cerva played their home matches at Estádio Municipal de Mondim de Basto, Mondim de Basto, instead of their regular stadium Campo de Futebol das Baraças, Cerva.)
- Trofense (CP) 5–0 Caniçal (CP)
- AD Oliveirense (CP) 8–1 Sendim (D)
- Joane (D) 0–0 (a.e.t.) (4–3 p) Barrosas (D)
- Cruzado Canicense (D) 1–4 Pedras Rubras (CP)
- Camacha (CP) 1–1 (a.e.t.) (4–2 p) Felgueiras 1932 (CP)
- Aliança de Gandra (CP) 0–1 Santa Eulália (D)
- São Martinho (CP) 6–0 Raimonda (D)

Series C

- Cinfães (CP) 4–0 Sporting de Espinho (D)
- Sanjoanense (CP) 4–2 (a.e.t.) Salgueiros (CP)
- Cesarense (CP) 1–1 (a.e.t.) (2–4 p) Moimenta da Beira (CP)
- Coimbrões (CP) 3–0 Gondomar (CP)
- Torre de Moncorvo (CP) 1–1 (a.e.t.) (4–2 p) Aguiar da Beira (D)
- Valadares Gaia (D) 2–0 Sousense (CP)
- Trancoso (D) 0–2 Oliveirense (CP)

Series D

- Lusitano de Vildemoinhos (CP) 3–1 Sátão (D)
- Estarreja (CP) 4–1 Pampilhosa (CP)
- Mortágua (CP) 1–0 AD Nogueirense (CP)
- Penalva do Castelo (D) 2–2 (a.e.t.) (4–3 p) Académica – SF (CP)
- Recreio de Águeda (CP) 3–2 (a.e.t.) Tourizense (CP)
- Gafanha (CP) 1–1 (a.e.t.) (6–5 p) Anadia (CP)
- Gouveia (CP) 0–4 Beira-Mar (D)

Series E

- Fátima (CP) 2–0 Carapinheirense (CP)
- Académico do Fundão (D) 0–1 Vitória de Sernache (CP)
- Vinha da Rainha (D) 1–4 Alcanenense (CP)
- Sertanense (CP) 1–0 Marinhense (D)
- Benfica e Castelo Branco (CP) 8–0 Naval 1º de Maio (CP)
- União de Leiria (CP) 10–0 Gavionenses (D) (Note: União de Leiria played their first round and second round home matches at Academia de Futebol da UD Leiria, Santa Eufémia (Leiria), instead of their regular stadium Estádio Dr. Magalhães Pessoa, Leiria.)
- Alcains (D) 2–0 Oleiros (CP)
- Ginásio de Alcobaça (CP) 1–0 Sourense (D)

Series F

- Loures (CP) 2–1 Vilafranquense (CP)
- Cartaxo (D) 2–2 (a.e.t.) (2–3 p) Mosteirense (D)
- Sporting de Lourel (D) 1–2 Beneditense (D) (Note: Sporting de Lourel played their home match at Campo Conde de Sucena, São Pedro de Sintra, instead of their regular stadium Complexo Desportivo Sargento Arménio, Lourel (Sintra).)
- Sintrense (CP) 0–1 Gafetense (CP)
- Torreense (CP) 1–0 Mafra (CP)
- Santa Iria (D) 2–1 Atlético da Malveira (CP) (Note: Santa Iria played their first round home match at Campo Conde de Mendia, Zambujal (Loures), and their third round home match at Campo do Sacavenense, Sacavém, instead of their regular stadium Campo de Jogos Tomaz Reynolds, Santa Iria de Azóia (Loures).)
- Fazendense (D) 0–3 Caldas (CP)

Series G

- Sporting Ideal (CP) 0–2 Praiense (CP)
- Sacavenense (CP) 4–0 Atlético CP (CP)
- Real (CP) 3–0 Rabo de Peixe (D)
- Lusitânia (CP) 2–3 1º de Dezembro (CP)
- Barreirense (CP) 2–1 (a.e.t.) Operário (CP)
- Angrense (CP) 1–0 São Roque (Açores) (D)
- Flamengos (D) 0–4 Oriental (CP) (Note: Flamengos played their home match at Estádio da Alagoa, Horta, Azores, instead of their regular stadium Campo do Vale, Flamengos, Azores.)
- Casa Pia (CP) 2–2 (a.e.t.) (6–7 p) Fabril do Barreiro (CP)

Series H

- Lusitano VRSA (CP) 3–0 Louletano (CP)
- Armacenenses (CP) 6–1 Redondense (D)
- Pinhalnovense (CP) 2–0 Lagoa (D)
- Almancilense (CP) 1–0 Amora (D)
- Sporting de Viana do Alentejo (CP) 3–0 Quarteirense (D)
- Moura (CP) 2–0 Beira-Mar de Almada (D)
- Praia de Milfontes (D) 1–4 Mineiro Aljustrelense (CP) (Note: Praia de Milfontes played their home match at Estádio Municipal Dr. Justino dos Santos, Odemira, instead of their regular stadium Campo Foz do Mira, Vila Nova de Milfontes.)
- Lusitano de Évora (D) 0–2 Farense (CP)

== Second round ==
A total of 92 teams participated in the second round, comprising the 60 winners of the previous round, the 17 non-reserve teams competing in the 2016–17 LigaPro (II), and 15 teams randomly drawn from among the first-round losers (repechage). The draw took place on Thursday, 8 September 2016, at 15:30 WEST. Matches were played on 24 and 25 September 2016. LigaPro sides played their matches away against lower division opponents.

Number of teams per tier entering this round
Primeira Liga	LigaPro	Campeonato de Portugal	District FAs	Total
18 / 18	17 / 17	56 / 79	19 / 41	110 / 155

Repechage

The following 15 first-round losing teams were selected to compete in the second round:

- Anadia (CP)
- Barrosas (D)
- Casa Pia (CP)
- Cerva (D)
- Gavionenses (D)
- Gouveia (CP)
- Lusitano de Évora (D)
- Naval 1º de Maio (CP)
- Pampilhosa (CP)
- Rabo de Peixe (D)
- São Roque (Açores) (D)
- Sendim (D)
- Sousense (CP)
- Sporting de Lourel (D)
- Vilafranquense (CP)

Fixtures

24 September 2016	Moimenta da Beira (CP)	0–0 (a.e.t.) (1–3 p)	(II) União da Madeira	Moimenta da Beira
14:30 WEST (UTC+01:00)				Stadium: Estádio Municipal Eduardo Requeijo Alves; Attendance: 200; Referee: André Neto
	Penalties
	Sorrilha (penalty missed); Eduardo (penalty missed); Kiko (penalty scored); Herculano (penalty missed)		(penalty scored) Tinoco; (penalty scored) Viveiros; (penalty scored) Carlos Manuel

24 September 2016	Sporting de Viana do Alentejo (CP)	1–2	(II) Cova da Piedade	Viana do Alentejo
15:00 WEST (UTC+01:00)	Freddy 80'		Robson 62'; Barros 87'	Stadium: Campo João de Sousa Faria e Melo; Attendance: 350; Referee: Miguel Silva

24 September 2016	Lusitano de Évora (D)	0–3	(II) Santa Clara	Évora
15:00 WEST (UTC+01:00)			Al-Gadi 7'; Ribeiro 69'; Reis 81'	Stadium: Campo da Estrela; Attendance: 400; Referee: Bruno Vieira

24 September 2016	São Roque (Açores) (D)	0–3	(CP) Caldas	Ponta Delgada, Azores
17:00 WEST (UTC+01:00)			Diogo Bento 47'; Alexander Cruz 51'; André Simões 81'	Stadium: Campo de Jogos de São Roque; Referee: Rui Soares

25 September 2016	União de Leiria (CP)	2–2 (a.e.t.) (4–3 p)	(II) Portimonense	Santa Eufémia (Leiria)
15:00 WEST (UTC+01:00)	Benny 51'; Antwi 81'		Ewerton 68'; Bruno Tabata 89'	Stadium: Academia de Futebol da UD Leiria; Attendance: 300; Referee: Tiago Antunes

25 September 2016	Pedras Rubras (CP)	0–1 (a.e.t.)	(II) Leixões	Pedras Rubras
15:00 WEST (UTC+01:00)			Bruno Henrique 108'	Stadium: Estádio Municipal de Pedras Rubras; Attendance: 1,400; Referee: Hélder Malheiro

25 September 2016	Anadia (CP)	0–0 (a.e.t.) (2–4 p)	(II) Varzim	Anadia
15:00 WEST (UTC+01:00)				Stadium: Estádio Municipal Eng. Sílvio Henriques Cerveira; Attendance: 600; Referee: Anzhony Rodrigues

25 September 2016	Mosteirense (D)	0–2	(II) Famalicão	Arronches
15:00 WEST (UTC+01:00)			Nailson 22'; Cunha 70'	Stadium: Estádio Municipal Francisco Palmeiro (Note: Mosteirense played their home match at Estádio Municipal Francisco Palmeiro, Arronches, instead of their regular stadium Campo de Jogos da Basteira, Mosteiros (Arronches).); Attendance: 200; Referee: João Carlos Bento

25 September 2016	Cerva (D)	0–5	(II) Freamunde	Mondim de Basto
15:00 WEST (UTC+01:00)			Miguel Pedro 19'; Nader 22', 54', 86'; Vieira 60'	Stadium: Estádio Municipal de Mondim de Basto; Attendance: 500; Referee: Carlos Macedo

25 September 2016	Gafetense (CP)	1–3	(II) Académico de Viseu	Crato
15:00 WEST (UTC+01:00)	Braz 31'		Zé Pedro 27', 56', 69' (pen.)	Stadium: Estádio Municipal do Crato (Note: Gafetense played their home match at Estádio Municipal do Crato, Crato, instead of their regular stadium Campo Dr. Armando Pequito, Gáfete.); Attendance: 200; Referee: António Nobre

25 September 2016	Joane (D)	0–1	(II) Sporting da Covilhã	Joane
15:00 WEST (UTC+01:00)			Davidson 47'	Stadium: Estádio de Barreiros; Attendance: 500; Referee: Gonçalo Martins

25 September 2016	Gouveia (CP)	1–2	(II) Académica	Gouveia
15:00 WEST (UTC+01:00)	Oumar 72'		Rui Miguel 40', 42'	Stadium: Estádio Municipal do Farvão; Attendance: 3,000; Referee: João Matos

25 September 2016	Oliveirense (CP)	1–1 (a.e.t.) (4–5 p)	(II) Penafiel	Oliveira de Azeméis
15:00 WEST (UTC+01:00)	Clayton 90+1'		Fidélis 74'	Stadium: Estádio Carlos Osório; Attendance: 600; Referee: Iancu Vasilica

25 September 2016	Naval 1º de Maio (CP)	3–2	(II) Fafe	Figueira da Foz
15:00 WEST (UTC+01:00)	Landim 48'; Grilo 52'; Cruz 90+2' (o.g.)		Xavi 35'; Brandão 65'	Stadium: Campo de Treinos do Estádio Municipal José Bento Pessoa (Note: Naval 1º de Maio played their home matches at Campo de Treinos do Estádio Municipal José Bento Pessoa, Figueira da Foz, instead of their regular stadium Estádio Municipal José Bento Pessoa, Figueira da Foz.); Attendance: 150; Referee: João Mendes

25 September 2016	Moura (CP)	0–4	(II) Desportivo das Aves	Moura
15:00 WEST (UTC+01:00)			Balogun 2', 16'; Ribeiro 55'; Tarcísio 62'	Stadium: Estádio do Moura AC; Attendance: 300; Referee: Carlos Cabral

25 September 2016	Ginásio de Alcobaça (CP)	0–2	(II) Vizela	Alcobaça
15:00 WEST (UTC+01:00)			Lamelas 45'; Kukula 77'	Stadium: Estádio Municipal de Alcobaça; Attendance: 300; Referee: Vítor Ferreira

25 September 2016	Sertanense (CP)	2–1 (a.e.t.)	(CP) Lusitano de Vildemoinhos	Sertã
15:00 WEST (UTC+01:00)	Grinood 25'; Martelo 96'		Rodrigues 42'	Stadium: Campo de Jogos Dr. Marques dos Santos; Referee: Carlos Espadinha

25 September 2016	Almancilense (CP)	0–2	(CP) Merelinense	Almancil
15:00 WEST (UTC+01:00)			Telmo Fernandes 27'; Torres 62'	Stadium: Estádio Municipal de Almancil; Referee: André Narciso

25 September 2016	Fátima (CP)	1–0	(CP) Pampilhosa	Fátima
15:00 WEST (UTC+01:00)	Caleb 38'			Stadium: Estádio Municipal de Fátima; Referee: Paulo Ferrás

25 September 2016	Casa Pia (CP)	2–1	(CP) Pinhalnovense	Lisbon
15:00 WEST (UTC+01:00)	João Coito 22'; Mário Costa 64'		Luís Leite 46'	Stadium: Estádio Pina Manique; Referee: Nélson Pereira

25 September 2016	Lusitano VRSA (CP)	2–0	(CP) Fabril do Barreiro	Vila Real de Santo António
15:00 WEST (UTC+01:00)	Hudson 6'; Juninho 48'			Stadium: Estádio Municipal de Vila Real de Santo António; Referee: Luís Catita

25 September 2016	Barrosas (D)	2–3	(CP) AD Oliveirense	Felgueiras
15:00 WEST (UTC+01:00)	Jorge Ferreira 19'; Bessa 24'		Adebanjo 54'; Vítor Hugo 63', 71'	Stadium: Estádio Dr. Machado de Matos (Note: Barrosas played their home match at Estádio Dr. Machado de Matos, Felgueiras, instead of their regular stadium Campo do CRPP Barrosas, Barrosas.); Referee: Rui Silva

25 September 2016	Loures (CP)	1–2	(CP) Oriental	Loures
15:00 WEST (UTC+01:00)	Ivo Miranda 43'		João Santos 36'; Mendes 90'	Stadium: Campo José da Silva Faria; Referee: Quitério Almeida

25 September 2016	Atlético dos Arcos (D)	0–2	(CP) Gafanha	Arcos de Valdevez
15:00 WEST (UTC+01:00)			Nádson 63'; Silvestre 67'	Stadium: Estádio Municipal da Coutada; Referee: Pedro Ferreira

25 September 2016	Alcains (D)	0–4	(CP) Limianos	Alcains
15:00 WEST (UTC+01:00)			Chiva 31'; Rafa Fontes 70'; Lane Nhaga 88' (pen.); Kiko 90+3'	Stadium: Campo de Jogos António Coelho Trigueiros de Aragão; Referee: Cláudio Durães

25 September 2016	Torre de Moncorvo (CP)	0–3	(CP) Cinfães	Torre de Moncorvo
15:00 WEST (UTC+01:00)			Pepe 32'; Vieira 50'; Nuninho 67'	Stadium: Estádio Eng. José Aires; Referee: Hélder Lamas

25 September 2016	Barreirense (CP)	3–0	(D) Valadares Gaia	Barreiro
15:00 WEST (UTC+01:00)	Luther King 79', 82'; David Pinto 90+2'			Stadium: Campo da Verderena; Referee: Bruno Rebocho

25 September 2016	Penalva do Castelo (D)	0–4	(CP) Amarante	Penalva do Castelo
15:00 WEST (UTC+01:00)			Ayongo 10', 20'; Rui Magalhães 82'; Badará 90'	Stadium: Parque Desportivo de Santa Ana; Referee: António Alves

25 September 2016	Sanjoanense (CP)	6–1	(CP) Pedras Salgadas	São João da Madeira
15:00 WEST (UTC+01:00)	Pardal 18', 38'; Pius 27'; Pereira 30'; Zé Pedro 76'; Neves 84'		Nuno Rodrigues 35'	Stadium: Estádio Conde Dias Garcia; Referee: Marco Cruz

25 September 2016	Estarreja (CP)	3–1	(CP) Ponte da Barca	Estarreja
15:00 WEST (UTC+01:00)	Gustavo Magalhães 22'; Alex Oliveira 26', 70'		Cortez 87'	Stadium: Estádio Dr. Tavares da Silva; Referee: Humberto Teixeira

25 September 2016	Maria da Fonte (D)	0–3	(CP) Torreense	Póvoa de Lanhoso
15:00 WEST (UTC+01:00)			Bonifácio 57', 70', 83'	Stadium: Campo dos Moinhos Novos; Referee: Diogo Pinto

25 September 2016	Coimbrões (CP)	2–5	(CP) Praiense	Coimbrões (Vila Nova de Gaia)
15:00 WEST (UTC+01:00)	Filipe Cardoso 26'; Miguel Gomes 89'		Vasco Goulart 2', 39'; Breno Freitas 51'; Filipe Andrade 70', 90'	Stadium: Parque Silva Matos; Referee: António Costa

25 September 2016	Benfica e Castelo Branco (CP)	3–1	(D) Santa Eulália	Castelo Branco
15:00 WEST (UTC+01:00)	Sá 28'; Adul Seidi 47'; Gilson 61'		Hélder Simão 35'	Stadium: Estádio Municipal Vale do Romeiro; Referee: Renato Gonçalves

25 September 2016	Vilafranquense (CP)	1–0	(CP) Vilaverdense	Vila Franca de Xira
15:00 WEST (UTC+01:00)	Ely 45'			Stadium: Campo do Cevadeiro; Referee: Paulo Raposo

25 September 2016	Alcanenense (CP)	4–2 (a.e.t.)	(D) Sendim	Alcanena
15:00 WEST (UTC+01:00)	Patrick Igwe 43'; Miguel Miguel 109'; Luís Tavares 115'; Ragner Paula 119'		Grilo 57'; Branquinho 104'	Stadium: Estádio Municipal Joaquim Maria Baptista; Referee: João Malheiro Pinto

25 September 2016	Trofense (CP)	6–1	(D) Beira-Mar	Trofa
15:00 WEST (UTC+01:00)	Viana 57'; Garcia 61'; Sousa 71' (pen.); Firmino 76', 87'; Carter 90+2'		Pirata 20'	Stadium: Estádio do CD Trofense; Referee: Bruno Nunes

25 September 2016	Beneditense (D)	0–3	(D) Santa Iria	Benedita (Alcobaça)
15:00 WEST (UTC+01:00)			Salvador Sá 37'; Diogo Soares 55'; Diogo Freitas 79'	Stadium: Parque de Jogos Fonte da Senhora; Referee: Rui Mendes

25 September 2016	Armacenenses (CP)	2–3	(CP) Mineiro Aljustrelense	Armação de Pêra
15:00 WEST (UTC+01:00)	Vítor Pestana 60'; George Jackson 84'		Tino 15' (pen.), 18'; Pedro Banana 71'	Stadium: Estádio Municipal de Armação de Pêra; Referee: João Letras

25 September 2016	Recreio de Águeda (CP)	2–1 (a.e.t.)	(CP) Sousense	Águeda
15:00 WEST (UTC+01:00)	Tiago Oliveira 44'; Marcelo 109'		Flávio Igor 70' (pen.)	Stadium: Estádio Municipal de Águeda; Referee: Pedro Campos

25 September 2016	Real (CP)	3–2	(CP) São Martinho	Queluz
15:00 WEST (UTC+01:00)	Thabo Cele 19'; Luís Mota 32'; Érico Castro 82'		Adílio Santos 85'; Moreno 90'	Stadium: Complexo Desportivo do Real SC; Referee: Paulo Barradas

25 September 2016	1º de Dezembro (CP)	2–0	(D) Sporting de Lourel	São Pedro de Sintra
15:00 WEST (UTC+01:00)	Diallo 42', 60'			Stadium: Campo Conde de Sucena; Referee: José Carlos Rodrigues

25 September 2016	Camacha (CP)	1–1 (a.e.t.) (2–4 p)	(CP) Vitória de Sernache	Camacha, Madeira
15:00 WEST (UTC+01:00)	David Macieira 76'		Marco Grilo 8'	Stadium: Complexo Desportivo da Camacha; Referee: Abel Silva

25 September 2016	Sacavenense (CP)	0–1	(II) Olhanense	Sacavém
16:00 WEST (UTC+01:00)			Cissé 72'	Stadium: Campo do Sacavenense; Attendance: 400; Referee: Luís Máximo

25 September 2016	Rabo de Peixe (D)	0–2	(II) Gil Vicente	Ribeira Grande, Azores
16:00 WEST (UTC+01:00)			Paulinho 80' (pen.); Rubio 83'	Stadium: Estádio Municipal da Ribeira Grande (Note: Rabo de Peixe played their home match at Estádio Municipal da Ribeira Grande, Ribeira Grande, Azores, instead of their regular stadium Campo de Jogos do Bom Jesus, Rabo de Peixe, Azores.); Attendance: 1,000; Referee: Pedro Vilaça

25 September 2016	Angrense (CP)	0–2 (a.e.t.)	(CP) Farense	Angra do Heroísmo, Azores
16:00 WEST (UTC+01:00)			Fábio 112'; Ribeiro 118'	Stadium: Estádio Municipal de Angra do Heroísmo; Referee: José Rodrigues

25 September 2016	Gavionenses (D)	2–3 (a.e.t.)	(CP) Mortágua	Gavião
16:00 WEST (UTC+01:00)	João Paulo 2'; Pedro Afonso 45'		Fábio Morais 40'; Castro 59'; Moacir Soares 102'	Stadium: Estádio do Salgueirinho; Referee: Pedro Ramalho

== Third round ==
A total of 64 teams participated in the third round, which included the 46 winners of the previous round and the 18 teams competing in the 2016–17 Primeira Liga (I). The draw took place on Thursday, 29 September 2016, at 17:30 WEST. Matches were played on 13, 14, 15 and 16 October 2016. Similarly to what occurred with LigaPro teams in the previous round, Primeira Liga sides played their matches away against lower division teams.

Number of teams per tier entering this round
Primeira Liga	LigaPro	Campeonato de Portugal	District FAs	Total
18 / 18	15 / 17	30 / 79	1 / 41	64 / 155

Fixtures

13 October 2016	Famalicão (II)	0–1	(I) Sporting CP	Vila Nova de Famalicão
20:15 WEST (UTC+01:00)			Marković 10'	Stadium: Estádio Municipal 22 de Junho; Attendance: 3,109; Referee: Manuel Mota

14 October 2016	Sporting da Covilhã (II)	1–0 (a.e.t.)	(II) Freamunde	Covilhã
15:00 WEST (UTC+01:00)	Soares 120'			Stadium: Estádio Municipal José dos Santos Pinto; Attendance: 300; Referee: António Nobre

14 October 2016	1º de Dezembro (CP)	1–2	(I) Benfica	Estoril
20:15 WEST (UTC+01:00)	Águas 62' (pen.)		Danilo 50'; Luisão 90+6'	Stadium: Estádio António Coimbra da Mota (Note: 1º de Dezembro played their third round home match at Estádio António Coimbra da Mota, Estoril, instead of their regular stadium Campo Conde de Sucena, São Pedro de Sintra.); Attendance: 5,349; Referee: Hélder Malheiro

15 October 2016	União de Leiria (CP)	0–2	(I) Boavista	Leiria
16:00 WEST (UTC+01:00)			Medeiros 9'; Lucas 16'	Stadium: Estádio Dr. Magalhães Pessoa; Attendance: 1,200; Referee: Manuel Oliveira

15 October 2016	Desportivo das Aves (II)	1–2 (a.e.t.)	(I) Paços de Ferreira	Vila das Aves
16:00 WEST (UTC+01:00)	Leandro 107'		Rodrigues 103'; Welthon 111'	Stadium: Estádio do CD Aves; Attendance: 1,500; Referee: Tiago Martins

15 October 2016	Penafiel (II)	1–0 (a.e.t.)	(CP) Amarante	Penafiel
16:00 WEST (UTC+01:00)	Wellington 118'			Stadium: Estádio Municipal 25 de Abril; Attendance: 600; Referee: Carlos Macedo

15 October 2016	Fátima (CP)	1–2	(II) Olhanense	Fátima
16:00 WEST (UTC+01:00)	Laranjeiro 55' (pen.)		Dibirgadzhiyev 11' (o.g.); González 37'	Stadium: Estádio Municipal de Fátima; Attendance: 150; Referee: Bruno Vieira

15 October 2016	AD Oliveirense (CP)	1–3	(I) Braga	Vila Nova de Famalicão
17:00 WEST (UTC+01:00)	Vítor Hugo 90+3'		Pedro Santos 17' (pen.), 84'; Fonte 38'	Stadium: Estádio Municipal 22 de Junho (Note: AD Oliveirense played their third round home match at Estádio Municipal 22 de Junho, Vila Nova de Famalicão, instead of their regular stadium Estádio de Ribes, Santa Maria de Oliveira (Vila Nova de Famalicão).); Attendance: 2,000; Referee: Luís Godinho

15 October 2016	Gafanha (CP)	0–3	(I) Porto	Aveiro
20:15 WEST (UTC+01:00)			Otávio 32'; Corona 70'; Depoitre 90'	Stadium: Estádio Municipal de Aveiro (Note: Gafanha played their third round home match at Estádio Municipal de Aveiro, Aveiro, instead of their regular stadium Complexo Desportivo da Gafanha da Nazaré, Gafanha da Nazaré.); Attendance: 8,000; Referee: Jorge Ferreira

16 October 2016	Santa Clara (II)	1–1 (a.e.t.) (4–2 p)	(I) Rio Ave	Ponta Delgada, Azores
12:00 WEST (UTC+01:00)	Batatinha 33'		Héldon 83'	Stadium: Estádio de São Miguel; Attendance: 2,493; Referee: Luís Ferreira
	Penalties
	Pacheco (penalty scored); D. Santos (penalty scored); Batatinha (penalty scored); Ribeiro (penalty scored)		(penalty missed) Héldon; (penalty scored) Rafa; (penalty scored) Krovinović; (penalty missed) Tarantini

16 October 2016	Estarreja (CP)	1–3	(I) Nacional	Estarreja
14:30 WEST (UTC+01:00)	Alex 67'		César 43'; Roniel 53'; Agra 55'	Stadium: Estádio Dr. Tavares da Silva; Attendance: 1,000; Referee: Bruno Esteves

16 October 2016	Sertanense (CP)	0–4	(I) Tondela	Sertã
15:00 WEST (UTC+01:00)			Wágner 8'; Moreno 16'; Murillo 53'; Crislan 90+2'	Stadium: Campo de Jogos Dr. Marques dos Santos; Attendance: 500; Referee: Vasco Santos

16 October 2016	Real (CP)	1–0	(I) Arouca	Queluz
15:00 WEST (UTC+01:00)	Nélson 85'			Stadium: Complexo Desportivo do Real SC; Attendance: 600; Referee: João Mendes

16 October 2016	Alcanenense (CP)	1–2	(I) Feirense	Alcanena
15:00 WEST (UTC+01:00)	Patrick 56'		Fabinho 26' (pen.); Etebo 77'	Stadium: Estádio Municipal Joaquim Maria Baptista; Attendance: 400; Referee: Gonçalo Martins

16 October 2016	Santa Iria (D)	1–2	(I) Vitória de Guimarães	Sacavém
15:00 WEST (UTC+01:00)	Flecha 90+2'		Bernard 29'; Soares 58'	Stadium: Campo do Sacavenense; Attendance: 3,000; Referee: Tiago Antunes

16 October 2016	Naval 1º de Maio (CP)	0–4	(I) Marítimo	Figueira da Foz
15:00 WEST (UTC+01:00)			Brito 61'; Ghazaryan 72', 76'; Sousa 88'	Stadium: Campo de Treinos do Estádio Municipal José Bento Pessoa; Attendance: 200; Referee: João Matos

16 October 2016	Caldas (CP)	0–1	(I) Estoril	Caldas da Rainha
15:00 WEST (UTC+01:00)			Paulo Henrique 63'	Stadium: Campo da Mata; Attendance: 1,500; Referee: Bruno Paixão

16 October 2016	Vizela (II)	1–0	(I) Moreirense	Vizela
15:00 WEST (UTC+01:00)	Boakye 82'			Stadium: Estádio do FC Vizela; Attendance: 3,000; Referee: João Capela

16 October 2016	União da Madeira (II)	0–1	(I) Chaves	Ribeira Brava, Madeira
15:00 WEST (UTC+01:00)			Perdigão 61'	Stadium: Centro Desportivo da Madeira; Attendance: 198; Referee: Hugo Miguel

16 October 2016	Mortágua (CP)	0–1	(II) Cova da Piedade	Mortágua
15:00 WEST (UTC+01:00)			Irobiso 62'	Stadium: Campo da Gandarada; Attendance: 500; Referee: Pedro Vilaça

16 October 2016	Gil Vicente (II)	0–0 (a.e.t.) (4–1 p)	(CP) Casa Pia	Barcelos
15:00 WEST (UTC+01:00)				Stadium: Estádio Cidade de Barcelos; Attendance: 386; Referee: Luís Máximo
	Penalties
	Reko (penalty scored); Paulinho (penalty scored); Luiz Eduardo (penalty scored); Rubio (penalty scored)		(penalty scored) Coito; (penalty missed) Sócrates; (penalty missed) Costa

16 October 2016	Mineiro Aljustrelense (CP)	1–0	(CP) Limianos	Aljustrel
15:00 WEST (UTC+01:00)	Banana 37'			Stadium: Estádio Municipal de Aljustrel; Referee: Nuno Alvo

16 October 2016	Cinfães (CP)	0–1	(CP) Benfica e Castelo Branco	Cinfães
15:00 WEST (UTC+01:00)			Matos 90+1'	Stadium: Estádio Municipal Prof. Cerveira Pinto; Referee: José Rodrigues

16 October 2016	Torreense (CP)	2–0	(II) Académico de Viseu	Torres Vedras
15:00 WEST (UTC+01:00)	Bonifácio 50'; Shang Jin 87'			Stadium: Estádio Manuel Marques; Attendance: 1,000; Referee: João Carlos Bento

16 October 2016	Oriental (CP)	2–0	(CP) Barreirense	Lisbon
15:00 WEST (UTC+01:00)	Yufeng Xiao 29'; Mota 44'			Stadium: Campo Eng. Carlos Salema; Referee: Rui Soares

16 October 2016	Varzim (II)	3–0	(CP) Recreio de Águeda	Póvoa de Varzim
15:00 WEST (UTC+01:00)	Costa 19', 78'; Cunha 36'			Stadium: Estádio do Varzim SC; Attendance: 400; Referee: Vítor Ferreira

16 October 2016	Merelinense (CP)	2–2 (a.e.t.) (6–7 p)	(II) Leixões	São Pedro de Merelim
15:00 WEST (UTC+01:00)	Tanela 32' (pen.); Canetas 85'		Manuel José 27' (pen.); Gregório 45'	Stadium: Estádio João Soares Vieira; Attendance: 1,500; Referee: André Neto
	Penalties
	Miguel (penalty scored); Torres (penalty scored); Luiz Alberto (penalty scored); Crespo (penalty scored); Canetas (penalty missed); Braga (penalty scored); Beck (penalty scored); Faria (penalty missed)		(penalty scored) Manuel José; (penalty scored) Lamas; (penalty scored) Bruno Henrique; (penalty scored) Fatai; (penalty missed) J. Silva; (penalty scored) Bruno China; (penalty scored) Cardoso; (penalty scored) Teixeira

16 October 2016	Sanjoanense (CP)	2–1	(CP) Lusitano VRSA	São João da Madeira
15:00 WEST (UTC+01:00)	Vinícius 2'; Zé Pedro 71'		López 3'	Stadium: Estádio Conde Dias Garcia; Referee: Pedro Ferreira

16 October 2016	Vitória de Sernache (CP)	0–1	(CP) Vilafranquense	Cernache do Bonjardim
15:00 WEST (UTC+01:00)			Wagner 47'	Stadium: Estádio Municipal D. Nuno Álvares Pereira; Referee: João Pinho

16 October 2016	Trofense (CP)	0–0 (a.e.t.) (2–4 p)	(I) Vitória de Setúbal	Trofa
16:00 WEST (UTC+01:00)				Stadium: Estádio do CD Trofense; Attendance: 1,500; Referee: Rui Costa
	Penalties
	Fernandes (penalty scored); Matos (penalty missed); Sousa (penalty scored); Mika (penalty missed)		(penalty scored) Meyong; (penalty scored) Zé Manuel; (penalty scored) Amaral; (penalty scored) Fernandes

16 October 2016	Praiense (CP)	3–1	(CP) Farense	Praia da Vitória, Azores
16:00 WEST (UTC+01:00)	Andrade 8'; Vieira 11' (o.g.); Marco Aurélio 90+3'		Pires 61'	Stadium: Estádio Municipal da Praia da Vitória; Referee: Cláudio Pereira

16 October 2016	Académica (II)	2–0	(I) Belenenses	Coimbra
19:15 WEST (UTC+01:00)	Marinho 37'; Almeida 64' (o.g.)			Stadium: Estádio Cidade de Coimbra; Attendance: 1,502; Referee: João Pinheiro

== Fourth round ==
A total of 32 teams participate in the fourth round, all of which advanced from the previous round. The draw took place on Friday, 21 October 2016, at 12:00 WEST, and unlike previous rounds, was free of restrictions. Matches were played on 13, 17, 18, 19 and 20 November 2016.

Number of teams per tier entering this round
Primeira Liga	LigaPro	Campeonato de Portugal	District FAs	Total
14 / 18	10 / 17	8 / 79	0 / 41	32 / 155

Fixtures

13 November 2016	Varzim (II)	0–1	(II) Sporting da Covilhã	Póvoa de Varzim
15:00 WET (UTC±00:00)			Harramiz 24'	Stadium: Estádio do Varzim SC; Attendance: 1,000; Referee: Miguel Silva

17 November 2016	Sporting CP (I)	5–1	(CP) Praiense	Lisbon
20:15 WET (UTC±00:00)	Oliveira 21'; Silva 47' (pen.); Bruno César 62'; André 79', 88'		Andrade 2'	Stadium: Estádio José Alvalade; Attendance: 13,895; Referee: Luís Ferreira

18 November 2016	Chaves (I)	0–0 (a.e.t.) (3–2 p)	(I) Porto	Chaves
20:15 WET (UTC±00:00)				Stadium: Estádio Municipal Eng. Manuel Branco Teixeira; Attendance: 7,900; Referee: João Capela
	Penalties
	Braga (penalty missed); Battaglia (penalty scored); Patrão (penalty scored); Lopes (penalty missed); Freire (penalty scored)		(penalty scored) Evandro; (penalty missed) Layún; (penalty scored) Telles; (penalty missed) Depoitre; (penalty missed) Silva

19 November 2016	Sanjoanense (CP)	1–0	(II) Gil Vicente	São João da Madeira
14:00 WET (UTC±00:00)	Ricardinho 28' (o.g.)			Stadium: Estádio Conde Dias Garcia; Attendance: 1,000; Referee: Ioan Vasilica

19 November 2016	Estoril (I)	2–0	(II) Cova da Piedade	Estoril
16:00 WET (UTC±00:00)	Ailton 21'; Gomes 90+1'			Stadium: Estádio António Coimbra da Mota; Attendance: 974; Referee: Gonçalo Martins

19 November 2016	Feirense (I)	0–0 (a.e.t.) (4–5 p)	(II) Académica	Santa Maria da Feira
16:00 WET (UTC±00:00)				Stadium: Estádio Marcolino de Castro; Attendance: 2,000; Referee: Artur Soares Dias
	Penalties
	Fabinho (penalty scored); Silva (penalty scored); Etebo (penalty scored); Ícaro (penalty missed); Platiny (penalty scored)		(penalty scored) Rui Miguel; (penalty scored) Traquina; (penalty scored) Plange; (penalty scored) Tom; (penalty scored) Real

19 November 2016	Benfica (I)	6–0	(I) Marítimo	Lisbon
20:15 WET (UTC±00:00)	Cervi 2'; Pizzi 38'; Mitroglou 43', 53'; Jiménez 69' (pen.); Guedes 88'			Stadium: Estádio da Luz; Attendance: 30,942; Referee: Carlos Xistra

20 November 2016	Real (CP)	2–0	(II) Olhanense	Queluz
14:00 WET (UTC±00:00)	Sabry 30'; Marques 47'			Stadium: Complexo Desportivo do Real SC; Attendance: 700; Referee: Anzhony Rodrigues

20 November 2016	Vizela (II)	0–1	(II) Penafiel	Vizela
14:00 WET (UTC±00:00)			João Paulo 83'	Stadium: Estádio do FC Vizela; Attendance: 750; Referee: Vasco Santos

20 November 2016	Benfica e Castelo Branco (CP)	0–2	(I) Vitória de Setúbal	Castelo Branco
15:00 WET (UTC±00:00)			Santana 25'; Claro 27' (pen.)	Stadium: Estádio Municipal Vale do Romeiro; Attendance: 2,200; Referee: João Matos

20 November 2016	Oriental (CP)	1–2 (a.e.t.)	(II) Leixões	Lisbon
15:00 WET (UTC±00:00)	Faísca 46'		Lamas 53'; Shihao 108'	Stadium: Campo Eng. Carlos Salema; Attendance: 300; Referee: Carlos Cabral

20 November 2016	Vilafranquense (CP)	1–0	(I) Paços de Ferreira	Vila Franca de Xira
15:00 WET (UTC±00:00)	Marocas 77'			Stadium: Campo do Cevadeiro; Attendance: 1,568; Referee: Hélder Malheiro

20 November 2016	Mineiro Aljustrelense (CP)	1–2	(I) Tondela	Aljustrel
15:00 WET (UTC±00:00)	Tino 14'		Cardoso 3'; Marcos 18' (o.g.)	Stadium: Estádio Municipal de Aljustrel; Attendance: 2,000; Referee: Nuno Almeida

20 November 2016	Torreense (CP)	1–0	(I) Nacional	Torres Vedras
15:00 WET (UTC±00:00)	Bonifácio 90+1'			Stadium: Estádio Manuel Marques; Attendance: 2,000; Referee: João Mendes

20 November 2016	Braga (I)	2–1	(II) Santa Clara	Braga
17:00 WET (UTC±00:00)	Fonte 86'; Stojiljković 90'		Castanheira 60'	Stadium: Estádio Municipal de Braga; Attendance: 3,514; Referee: Rui Oliveira

20 November 2016	Boavista (I)	1–2 (a.e.t.)	(I) Vitória de Guimarães	Porto
19:15 WET (UTC±00:00)	Schembri 56'		Soares 27' (pen.); Hurtado 118'	Stadium: Estádio do Bessa; Attendance: 10,000; Referee: Jorge Sousa

== Fifth round ==
A total of 16 teams participated in the fifth round, all of which advanced from the previous round. The draw took place on Thursday, 24 November 2016, at 15:00 WET. Matches were played on 14–15 December 2016.

Number of teams per tier entering this round
Primeira Liga	LigaPro	Campeonato de Portugal	District FAs	Total
8 / 18	4 / 17	4 / 79	0 / 41	16 / 155

Fixtures

14 December 2016	Leixões (II)	2–1	(I) Tondela	Matosinhos
15:00 WET (UTC±00:00)	Chiquinho 22'; Wellington 51'		Moreno 39'	Stadium: Estádio do Mar; Attendance: 1,500; Referee: Manuel Mota

14 December 2016	Torreense (CP)	2–3	(I) Chaves	Torres Vedras
15:00 WET (UTC±00:00)	Bonifácio 34'; Freire 90' (o.g.)		Perdigão 44'; Martins 58'; Battaglia 90+9' (pen.)	Stadium: Estádio Manuel Marques; Attendance: 2,000; Referee: Tiago Martins

14 December 2016	Estoril (I)	4–2 (a.e.t.)	(CP) Sanjoanense	Estoril
17:00 WET (UTC±00:00)	Gomes 57', 117'; Bazelyuk 80', 113'		Pereira 9'; Neves 67' (pen.)	Stadium: Estádio António Coimbra da Mota; Attendance: 597; Referee: Rui Oliveira

14 December 2016	Académica (II)	1–0	(II) Penafiel	Coimbra
18:00 WET (UTC±00:00)	Ohemeng 88'			Stadium: Estádio Cidade de Coimbra; Attendance: 1,425; Referee: Rui Costa

14 December 2016	Real (CP)	0–3	(I) Benfica	Lisbon
19:00 WET (UTC±00:00)			Mitroglou 47', 81' (pen.); Jiménez 85'	Stadium: Estádio do Restelo (Note: Real played their fifth round home match at Estádio do Restelo, Lisbon, instead of their regular stadium Complexo Desportivo do Real SC, Queluz.); Attendance: 6,000; Referee: Jorge Ferreira

14 December 2016	Braga (I)	1–2	(II) Sporting da Covilhã	Braga
20:00 WET (UTC±00:00)	Eduardo 3'		Diarra 28'; Davidson 65'	Stadium: Estádio Municipal de Braga; Attendance: 2,702; Referee: Fábio Veríssimo

14 December 2016	Vitória de Setúbal (I)	0–1	(I) Sporting CP	Setúbal
21:00 WET (UTC±00:00)			Dost 75'	Stadium: Estádio do Bonfim; Attendance: 4,993; Referee: Nuno Almeida

15 December 2016	Vitória de Guimarães (I)	1–0	(CP) Vilafranquense	Guimarães
18:00 WET (UTC±00:00)	Hurtado 61'			Stadium: Estádio D. Afonso Henriques; Attendance: 3,040; Referee: Luís Godinho

== Quarter-finals ==
A total of eight teams participated in the quarter-finals, all of which advanced from the previous round. The draw took place on Tuesday, 20 December 2016, at 15:00 WET. Matches were played on 17–18 January 2017.

Number of teams per tier entering this round
Primeira Liga	LigaPro	Campeonato de Portugal	District FAs	Total
5 / 18	3 / 17	0 / 79	0 / 41	8 / 155

Fixtures

17 January 2017	Estoril (I)	2–1	(II) Académica	Estoril
18:15 WET (UTC±00:00)	Alisson 31'; Kléber 85'		Traquina 58'	Stadium: Estádio António Coimbra da Mota; Attendance: 2,175; Referee: Rui Costa

17 January 2017	Chaves (I)	1–0	(I) Sporting CP	Chaves
20:15 WET (UTC±00:00)	Carlos Ponck 87'			Stadium: Estádio Municipal Eng. Manuel Branco Teixeira; Attendance: 5,320; Referee: Artur Soares Dias

18 January 2017	Sporting da Covilhã (II)	0–1	(I) Vitória de Guimarães	Covilhã
18:30 WET (UTC±00:00)			Hernâni 79'	Stadium: Complexo Desportivo da Covilhã (Note: Sporting da Covilhã played their quarter-final home match at Complexo Desportivo da Covilhã, Covilhã, instead of their regular stadium Estádio Municipal José dos Santos Pinto, Covilhã.); Attendance: 1,825; Referee: Manuel Oliveira

18 January 2017	Benfica (I)	6–2	(II) Leixões	Lisbon
20:30 WET (UTC±00:00)	Pizzi 21'; Almeida 31'; Jonas 38'; Mitroglou 60' (pen.), 71', 90+1'		Porcellis 44', 67'	Stadium: Estádio da Luz; Attendance: 19,048; Referee: Gonçalo Martins

== Semi-finals ==
The semi-final pairings were determined on Tuesday, 20 December 2016, at 15:00 WET, following the draw for the quarter-finals. This round was contested over two legs in a home-and-away system; the first legs were played on 1 March and the second legs were played on 5 April 2017.

Number of teams per tier entering this round
Primeira Liga	LigaPro	Campeonato de Portugal	District FAs	Total
4 / 18	0 / 17	0 / 79	0 / 41	4 / 155

Fixtures

28 February 2017
20:15 WET (UTC±00:00)

Estoril (I)	1–2	(I) Benfica
Kléber 41' (pen.)		Mitroglou 36', 89'

Estádio António Coimbra da Mota, Estoril
Attendance: 6,807
Referee: Jorge Ferreira (Braga)
5 April 2017
20:15 WEST (UTC+01:00)

Benfica (I)	3–3	(I) Estoril
Carrillo 33'; Živković 54'; Jonas 62'		Gomes 31', 78'; Carlinhos 46'

Estádio da Luz, Lisbon
Referee: Rui Costa (Porto)

Benfica won 5–4 on aggregate.

1 March 2017
20:15 WET (UTC±00:00)

Vitória de Guimarães (I)	2–0	(I) Chaves
Hernâni 10', 77'

Estádio D. Afonso Henriques, Guimarães
Attendance: 10,088
Referee: Bruno Esteves (Setúbal)
4 April 2017
20:15 WEST (UTC+01:00)

Chaves (I)	3–1	(I) Vitória de Guimarães
Perdigão 1'; Bressan 33'; Coelho 63'		Marega 65'

Estádio Municipal Eng. Manuel Branco Teixeira, Chaves
Referee: Fábio Veríssimo (Leiria)

3–3 on aggregate. Vitória de Guimarães won on away goals.

== Final ==
28 May 2017
17:15 WEST

Benfica	2–1	Vitória de Guimarães
Grimaldo (yellow card) 45+4'; Jiménez 48' (yellow card) 48'; Salvio 53'; Samaris (yellow card) 69'	Report	Gaspar (yellow card) 19'; Marega (yellow card) 21'; Zungu 78'; Sá (yellow card) 88'

Estádio Nacional, Oeiras
Attendance: 35,390
Referee: Hugo Miguel (Lisbon)
