= Ivan Silva (footballer, born 1990) =

Portuguese footballer

Personal information
- Full name: Ivan Eduardo Nóbrega da Silva
- Date of birth: 24 July 1990 (age 36)
- Place of birth: Faro, Portugal
- Height: 1.75 m (5 ft 9 in)
- Position: Defender

Team information
- Current team: Armacenenses

Youth career
- 2001–2002: Clube Desportivo Checul
- 2002–2003: Louletano
- 2003–2007: Internacional de Almancil
- 2008: Vålerenga
- 2008–2009: Internacional de Almancil

Senior career*
Years	Team	Apps	(Gls)
2009–2010	Quarteirense	5	(1)
2011	Benfica Luanda		
2011	Quarteira		
2012	Lagoa	9	(0)
2013	Anagennisi Epanomi	6	(0)
2013	Oppsal IF		
2013	Anagennisi Giannitsa		
2014	Louletano	7	(0)
2015	Quarteirense	14	(1)
2015–2016	Castrense	22	(0)
2016–2017	ÍF Huginn	14	(0)
2017–2018	Almancilense	10	(0)
2018	Armacenenses	14	(0)
2018	Olhanense	3	(0)
2018–2019	Oleiros	18	(0)
2019–	Armacenenses	0	(0)
- * Club domestic league appearances and goals as of 20:30, 19 July 2019 (UTC)

Ivan Eduardo Nóbrega da Silva (born 24 July 1990) is a Portuguese footballer who plays as a defender for Armacenenses.

== Career ==
Silva had youth stints with Clube Desportivo Checul, Louletano, Internacional de Almancil and Vålerenga. In 2009, Silva joined Quarteirense prior to joining Angolan Girabola team Benfica Luanda in 2011. He then returned to Portugal to play for Quarteira and Lagoa, before moving to Greece to sign for Anagennisi Epanomi of the Football League. He played six times for Anagennisi Epanomi, which included his professional debut on 27 January 2013 during a loss to Iraklis. Subsequent moves to Oppsal IF and Anagennisi Giannitsa followed. 2014 saw Silva join Campeonato de Portugal's Louletano, who he played for in 2002 and 2003.

He featured seven times for Louletano during the 2014–15 season. In January 2015, he joined fellow Campeonato de Portugal team Quarteirense; one of his ex-clubs. He scored in his third appearance back for Quarteirense, in a 3–1 win versus Aljustrelense on 1 March. For the 2015–16 Campeonato de Portugal, Silva played for Castrense and made twenty-two appearances as they were relegated. On 19 April 2016, Silva joined ÍF Huginn of Iceland's 1. deild karla. His debut arrived on 7 May in a win away to Fjarðabyggð. Silva returned to Portugal in 2017 to join Almancilense, which preceded a move to Armacenenses in 2018.

Olhanense signed Silva on 1 July 2018. After just three appearances in the following three months, he departed to sign for Oleiros. His first appearance came during a win over União de Leiria on 2 December. Silva left at the conclusion of 2018–19, subsequently rejoining Armacenenses in July 2019.

== Career statistics ==
As of 19 July 2019

Appearances and goals by club, season and competition
Club	Season	League			Cup		Continental		Other		Total	
Club	Season	Division	Apps	Goals	Apps	Goals	Apps	Goals	Apps	Goals	Apps	Goals
Armacenenses	2017–18	Campeonato de Portugal	14	0	0	0	—		0	0	14	0
Olhanense	2018–19	Campeonato de Portugal	3	0	0	0	—		0	0	3	0
Oleiros	2018–19	Campeonato de Portugal	18	0	0	0	—		0	0	18	0
Armacenenses	2019–20	Campeonato de Portugal	0	0	0	0	—		0	0	0	0
Career total			35	0	0	0	—		0	0	35	0
