= 2018–19 Campeonato de Portugal =

6th season of the Campeonato de Portugal football league

Campeonato de Portugal
- Season: 2018–19
- Champions: Casa Pia
- Promoted: Casa Pia; Vilafranquense
- Relegated: 20 teams
- Matches: 1,237
- Goals: 3,121 (2.52 per match)
- Top goalscorer: Gonçalo Gregório (22 goals)

The 2018–19 Campeonato de Portugal was the sixth season of Portuguese football's new third-tier league, since the merging of the Segunda Divisão and Terceira Divisão in 2013, the fourth season under the current Campeonato de Portugal title, and the 72nd season of recognised third-tier football in Portugal. A total of 72 teams competed in this division, which began in August 2018 and ended in June 2019.

== Format ==
The competition format consists of two stages. In the first stage, the 72 clubs will be divided in four series of 18 teams, according to geographic criteria. In each series, teams play against each other in a home-and-away double round-robin system.

In the second stage, the two best-placed teams of each of four Series will dispute a series of playoff matches to promote to the LigaPro. The two finalists will be promoted directly. The five bottom clubs of each series will be relegated.

== Teams ==
Location of teams of the 2018–19 Campeonato de Portugal (Mainland).
Red: Serie A; Green: Serie B; Blue: Serie C; Yellow: Serie D.
Location of teams of the 2018–19 Campeonato de Portugal (Madeira).
Green: Serie B.
Location of teams of the 2018–19 Campeonato de Portugal (Azores).
Yellow: Serie D.

Relegated from the 2017–18 LigaPro:

- União da Madeira
- ~~Sporting B~~
- Gil Vicente
- Real

From the 2017–18 Campeonato de Portugal:

- Vizela
- Vilaverdense
- Fafe
- Mirandela
- Merelinense
- São Martinho
- AD Oliveirense
- Pedras Salgadas
- Montalegre
- Torcatense
- Felgueiras 1932
- Sp. Espinho
- Gondomar
- Cesarense
- Cinfães
- Amarante
- Sanjoanense
- Pedras Rubras
- Trofense
- Coimbrões
- União de Leiria
- Lusitano Vildemoinhos
- Benfica Castelo Branco
- Sertanense
- Águeda
- Gafanha
- Anadia
- Marítimo B
- AD Nogueirense
- Oleiros
- Vilafranquense
- Praiense
- Torreense
- Sacavenense
- Fátima
- Loures
- Caldas
- 1.º Dezembro
- Sintrense
- Oriental
- Olhanense
- Casa Pia
- Pinhalnovense
- Louletano
- Armacenenses
- Moura
- Olímpico Montijo
- Sp. Ideal

Promoted from the 2017–18 District Championships:

- Algarve FA: Ferreiras
- Aveiro FA: Lusitânia Lourosa
- Beja FA: Vasco da Gama Vidigueira
- Braga FA: Maria da Fonte and Caçadores das Taipas
- Bragança FA: Mirandês
- Castelo Branco FA: Alcains
- Coimbra FA: Oliveira do Hospital
- Évora FA: Redondense
- Guarda FA: Sp. Mêda
- Leiria FA: Peniche
- Lisboa FA: Alverca and Santa Iria
- ~~Madeira FA: Pontassolense~~
- ~~Portalegre FA: Mosteirense~~
- Porto FA: Paredes and Leça
- Santarém FA: Mação
- Setúbal FA: Amora
- Viana do Castelo FA: Limianos
- Vila Real FA: Chaves B
- Viseu FA: ~~Sp. Lamego~~; Penalva do Castelo
- Liga Meo Azores: Angrense

Notes

Pontassolense and Mosteirense declined to be promoted. The teams that finished from second to fourth in the respective district championships declined invitations as well. They were substituted by Leça and Caçadores das Taipas, Porto FA and Braga FA's second-placed teams respectively. Sp. Lamego also declined to be promoted and were substituted by Penalva do Castelo, Viseu FA's second-placed team. Sporting B has declined to participate in Campeonato de Portugal 2018-19 and were substituted by Santa Iria, Lisbon FA's second-placed team.

== Group stage ==
=== Serie A ===
Pos	Team	Pld	W	D	L	GF	GA	GD	Pts	Qualification or relegation
1	Vizela (Q)	32	23	6	3	73	13	+60	75	Qualification to promotion play-offs
2	Fafe (Q)	32	21	7	4	59	24	+35	70	Qualification to promotion play-offs
3	São Martinho	32	20	9	3	51	20	+31	69	
4	Trofense	32	20	7	5	60	24	+36	67	
5	Felgueiras	32	20	4	8	55	33	+22	64	
6	Mirandela	32	14	7	11	49	41	+8	49	
7	Chaves B	32	13	8	11	55	41	+14	47	
8	Merelinense	32	10	12	10	38	38	0	42	
9	Montalegre	32	10	10	12	37	50	−13	40	
10	Pedras Salgadas	32	11	6	15	43	54	−11	39	
11	Maria da Fonte	32	9	10	13	41	50	−9	37	
12	AD Oliveirense	32	10	7	15	40	55	−15	37	
13	Limianos (R)	32	10	7	15	31	45	−14	37	Relegation to District Championship
14	Torcatense (R)	32	8	5	19	29	61	−32	29	Relegation to District Championship
15	Mirandês (R)	32	5	6	21	26	55	−29	21	Relegation to District Championship
16	Caçadores das Taipas (R)	32	4	6	22	27	64	−37	18	Relegation to District Championship
17	Vilaverdense (R)	32	4	3	25	30	83	−53	15	Relegation to District Championship
–	Gil Vicente	34	22	4	8	-	-	—	70 (Note: Gil Vicente will be promoted to the Primeira Liga next season so its matches are not accounted in the standings.)	Promotion to 2019-20 Primeira Liga

Updated to match(es) played on 13 May 2019. Source: FPF.pt
Rules for classification: 1) Points, 2) Head-to-head points, 3) Head-to-head goal difference, 4) Goal difference, 5) Matches won, 6) Goals scored
(Q) Qualified for the phase indicated; (R) Relegated

=== Serie B ===
Pos	Team	Pld	W	D	L	GF	GA	GD	Pts	Qualification or relegation
1	Sp. Espinho (Q)	34	20	9	5	52	20	+32	69	Qualification to promotion play-offs
2	Lusitânia Lourosa (Q)	34	19	12	3	52	27	+25	69	Qualification to promotion play-offs
3	Gondomar	34	18	10	6	40	17	+23	64	
4	Águeda	34	16	12	6	43	26	+17	60	
5	Lusitano Vildemoinhos	34	17	8	9	59	28	+31	59	
6	Sanjoanense	34	15	10	9	44	34	+10	55	
7	Amarante	34	15	9	10	45	28	+17	54	
8	Coimbrões	34	13	10	11	43	39	+4	49	
9	Marítimo B	34	12	13	9	53	40	+13	49	
10	Paredes	34	13	7	14	42	33	+9	46	
11	União da Madeira	34	12	8	14	28	32	−4	44	
12	Leça	34	12	7	15	34	41	−7	43	
13	Pedras Rubras	34	9	15	10	32	37	−5	42	
14	Cinfães (R)	34	11	8	15	33	40	−7	41	Relegation to District Championship
15	Gafanha (R)	34	11	4	19	46	69	−23	37	Relegation to District Championship
16	Penalva do Castelo (R)	34	7	7	20	25	57	−32	28	Relegation to District Championship
17	Cesarense (R)	34	4	13	17	37	55	−18	25	Relegation to District Championship
18	Sp. Mêda (R)	34	0	2	32	21	99	−78	2	Relegation to District Championship

Updated to match(es) played on 13 May 2019. Source: FPF.pt
Rules for classification: 1) Points, 2) Head-to-head points, 3) Head-to-head goal difference, 4) Goal difference, 5) Matches won, 6) Goals scored
(Q) Qualified for the phase indicated; (R) Relegated

=== Serie C ===
Pos	Team	Pld	W	D	L	GF	GA	GD	Pts	Qualification or relegation
1	União de Leiria (Q)	34	24	3	7	59	24	+35	75	Qualification to promotion play-offs
2	Vilafranquense (Q)	34	21	9	4	56	22	+34	72	Qualification to promotion play-offs
3	Anadia	34	20	11	3	52	23	+29	71	
4	Benfica Castelo Branco	34	17	11	6	45	23	+22	62	
5	Sintrense	34	15	9	10	49	41	+8	54	
6	Oliveira do Hospital	34	13	13	8	42	27	+15	52	
7	Alverca	34	14	9	11	39	33	+6	51	
8	Caldas	34	12	10	12	37	38	−1	46	
9	Oleiros	34	11	12	11	38	44	−6	45	
10	Torreense	34	11	11	12	36	36	0	44	
11	Fátima	34	12	7	15	38	46	−8	43	
12	Loures	34	11	8	15	33	31	+2	41	
13	Sertanense	34	8	17	9	32	36	−4	41	
14	AD Nogueirense (R)	34	11	8	15	32	39	−7	41	Relegation to District Championship
15	Santa Iria (R)	34	9	8	17	35	55	−20	35	Relegation to District Championship
16	Alcains (R)	34	5	8	21	21	48	−27	23	Relegation to District Championship
17	Peniche (R)	34	5	8	21	21	36	−15	23	Relegation to District Championship
18	Mação (R)	34	3	6	25	20	69	−49	15	Relegation to District Championship

Updated to match(es) played on 13 May 2019. Source: FPF.pt
Rules for classification: 1) Points, 2) Head-to-head points, 3) Head-to-head goal difference, 4) Goal difference, 5) Matches won, 6) Goals scored
(Q) Qualified for the phase indicated; (R) Relegated

=== Serie D ===
Pos	Team	Pld	W	D	L	GF	GA	GD	Pts	Qualification or relegation
1	Praiense (Q)	34	24	5	5	57	21	+36	77	Qualification to promotion play-offs
2	Casa Pia (Q)	34	23	1	10	69	28	+41	70	Qualification to promotion play-offs
3	Real	34	20	9	5	61	22	+39	69	
4	Oriental	34	18	10	6	44	22	+22	64	
5	Olhanense	34	19	6	9	68	32	+36	63	
6	Amora	34	18	6	10	49	36	+13	60	
7	1.º Dezembro	34	14	9	11	48	40	+8	51	
8	Armacenenses	34	13	12	9	42	44	−2	51	
9	Louletano	34	12	14	8	37	30	+7	50	
10	Olímpico Montijo	34	14	7	13	50	41	+9	49	
11	Sp. Ideal	34	12	11	11	40	39	+1	47	
12	Pinhalnovense	34	12	9	13	51	54	−3	45	
13	Sacavenense	34	10	9	15	50	49	+1	39	
14	Vasco da Gama Vidigueira (R)	34	9	6	19	37	61	−24	33	Relegation to District Championship
15	Moura (R)	34	7	9	18	45	65	−20	30	Relegation to District Championship
16	Angrense (R)	34	7	9	18	29	55	−26	30	Relegation to District Championship
17	Ferreiras (R)	34	3	8	23	22	77	−55	17	Relegation to District Championship
18	Redondense (R)	34	0	2	32	21	104	−83	2	Relegation to District Championship

Updated to match(es) played on 13 May 2019. Source: FPF.pt
Rules for classification: 1) Points, 2) Head-to-head points, 3) Head-to-head goal difference, 4) Goal difference, 5) Matches won, 6) Goals scored
(Q) Qualified for the phase indicated; (R) Relegated

== Promotion play-offs ==
Qualified Clubs to Play-offs
Qualified Clubs to Play-offs (Azores)

The winners and the runners-up of the 4 Series were qualified to the Promotion Play-offs, where the winning team and the runner-up were promoted to 2019–20 LigaPro.

=== Bracket ===
Quarter-finals
25 May/2 June 2019
Lusitânia Lourosa	2	0	2
Leiria	3	2	5
25 May/2 June 2019
Vilafranquense (a)	2	1	3
Vizela	0	3	3
25 May/2 June 2019
Casa Pia (p)	1	0	1 (4)
Sp. Espinho	0	1	1 (2)
25 May/2 June 2019
Fafe	0	1	1
Praiense	1	1	2

Semi-finals
9/16 June 2019
Leiria	1	1	2 (2)
Vilafranquense (p)	1	1	2 (4)
9/16 June 2019
Casa Pia (a)	1	1	2
Praiense	0	2	2

Final
23 June 2019 – Estádio Nacional
Vilafranquense	2 (2)
Casa Pia	2 (4)

=== Final ===
23 June 2019
17:00 WEST

Vilafranquense	2–2 (a.e.t.)	Casa Pia
Kelvin Medina 57'; Tocatins 92'	Report	João Coito 80', 111'
Penalties
Penalty missed Penalty scored	2–4	Penalty scored

Estádio Nacional, Oeiras
Attendance: 4,243
Referee: Rui Silva
