= Iván Silva =

Iván or Ivan Silva may refer to:

- Iván Silva (motorcyclist) (born 1982), Spanish motorcycle road racer
- Iván Felipe Silva (born 1996), Cuban judoka
- Ivan Silva (footballer, born 1990), Portuguese football defender
- Iván Silva (footballer, born 1993), Uruguayan football defender
- Iván Silva (footballer, born 1994), Argentine football midfielder
