= Pedro Bonifácio =

Portuguese footballer

Personal information
- Full name: Pedro João Luís Bonifácio
- Date of birth: 6 August 1985 (age 41)
- Place of birth: Mafra, Portugal
- Height: 1.80 m (5 ft 11 in)
- Position: Striker

Youth career
- 1996–2000: Ericeirense
- 2000–2003: Mafra

Senior career*
Years	Team	Apps	(Gls)
2003–2007	Mafra	43	(6)
2007–2008	Igreja Nova		
2008–2011	Mafra	80	(25)
2011–2012	Doxa	25	(8)
2012–2013	Anagennisi Deryneia	13	(4)
2013	Vardar	3	(0)
2013–2014	Mafra	26	(10)
2014–2016	Atlético Malveira	62	(28)
2016–2019	Torreense	86	(26)
2019–2020	Sintrense	16	(2)
Total		354	(109)
- * Club domestic league appearances and goals

Pedro João Luís Bonifácio (born 6 August 1985) is a Portuguese former professional footballer who played as a striker.

== Career ==
Bonifácio was born in Mafra, Lisbon District. He never played in higher than the third division in his country, representing mainly local club C.D. Mafra where he also acted as captain. in the 2015–16 season he scored a career-best 15 goals to help AC Malveira finish in fourth place in their group (among ten teams), also helping them to the fourth round of the Taça de Portugal whilst being crowned the competition's top scorer.

From summer 2011 until January 2013, Bonifácio competed in the Cypriot Second Division. Subsequently, the 27-year-old signed with FK Vardar from the Macedonian First Football League, making his professional debut on 12 March 2013 in a 6–1 home win against KF Shkëndija where he came on as a 72nd-minute substitute.

Bonifácio returned to Portugal in the 2016 off-season, joining S.C.U. Torreense. In his debut campaign, he netted six times in five games as his side reached the last-16 stage in the domestic cup – this included the only in a 1–0 defeat of Primeira Liga's C.D. Nacional, where he also missed a penalty kick.

== Honours ==
Vardar

- Macedonian First Football League: 2012–13

Individual

- Taça de Portugal top scorer: 2015–16
