= Tiago Mota (footballer, born 1985) =

Portuguese footballer

Personal information
- Full name: Tiago José Bico Mota
- Date of birth: 12 November 1985 (age 40)
- Place of birth: Lisbon, Portugal
- Height: 1.80 m (5 ft 11 in)
- Position: Midfielder

Team information
- Current team: Vilafranquense (staff)

Youth career
- 2001–2002: CAC
- 2002–2004: Porto
- 2004–2005: Lourinhanense

Senior career*
Years	Team	Apps	(Gls)
2005–2006	Loures		
2006–2007	Oeiras		
2007–2008	Atlético CP	15	(1)
2008–2009	Nea Salamis	21	(0)
2009–2017	Oriental	233	(16)
2017–2018	Malveira		
2018–2019	Vilafranquense	19	(1)
- * Club domestic league appearances and goals

Tiago José Bico Mota (born 12 November 1985) is a Portuguese retired football player.

== Career ==
=== Club career ===
He made his professional debut in the Segunda Liga for Oriental on 9 August 2014 in a game against Santa Clara.

=== Later career ===
After a prolonged injury, 34-year old Mota retired at the end of 2019 and immediately became a part of the technical team of his last club U.D. Vilafranquense.
