= André Matias (footballer) =

Portuguese footballer (born 1987)

Personal information
- Full name: André Gabriel Matias
- Date of birth: 11 September 1987 (age 39)
- Place of birth: Portimão, Portugal
- Height: 1.70 m (5 ft 7 in)
- Position: Forward

Team information
- Current team: Almancilense

Youth career
- 2005–2006: Belenenses

Senior career*
Years	Team	Apps	(Gls)
2006–2007	Atlético do Cacém		
2008	Messinense		
2008–2010	Louletano		
2010–2011	Olhanense	0	(0)
2011	→ Fátima (loan)	2	(0)
2011–2012	Atlético CP	9	(1)
2012	Portimonense	1	(0)
2013–2014	Farense	48	(6)
2014	Taranto		
2015	Louletano	1	(0)
2015–2016	Lusitano VRSA	7	(1)
2016–2017	Armacenenses	11	(4)
2017–	Almancilense	1	(0)
- * Club domestic league appearances and goals as of 5 December 2017

André Gabriel Matias (born 11 September 1987) is a Portuguese football player of Mozambican descent who plays for Almancilense.

== Club career ==
He made his professional debut in the Segunda Liga for Fátima on 22 January 2011 in a game against Gil Vicente.
