= Hugo Ventosa =

Portuguese footballer

Personal information
- Full name: Hugo Ricardo Lavinas Castro Mendonça Ventosa
- Date of birth: 8 May 1989 (age 37)
- Place of birth: Póvoa de Santa Iria, Portugal
- Height: 1.83 m (6 ft 0 in)
- Position: Right back

Team information
- Current team: Malveira

Youth career
- 1997–1999: Alhandra
- 1999–2001: Sporting CP
- 2001–2004: Alverca
- 2004–2005: Belenenses
- 2005–2008: Estrela Amadora

Senior career*
Years	Team	Apps	(Gls)
2008–2009	Sintrense	18	(1)
2009–2012	Sertanense	70	(0)
2012–2013	Torreense	16	(0)
2013–2014	Moura	32	(5)
2014–2016	Farense	57	(1)
2016–2017	Operário	29	(1)
2017–2020	Mafra	48	(6)
2020–2021	Alverca	15	(1)
2021–2022	Real Massamá	19	(0)
2022–2024	Atlético CP	50	(4)
2024–	Malveira	0	(0)
- * Club domestic league appearances and goals as of 10 June 2024

Hugo Ricardo Lavinas Castro Mendonça Ventosa (born 8 May 1989) is a Portuguese professional footballer who plays for Malveira as a right back.
