= 2017 Taça de Portugal final =

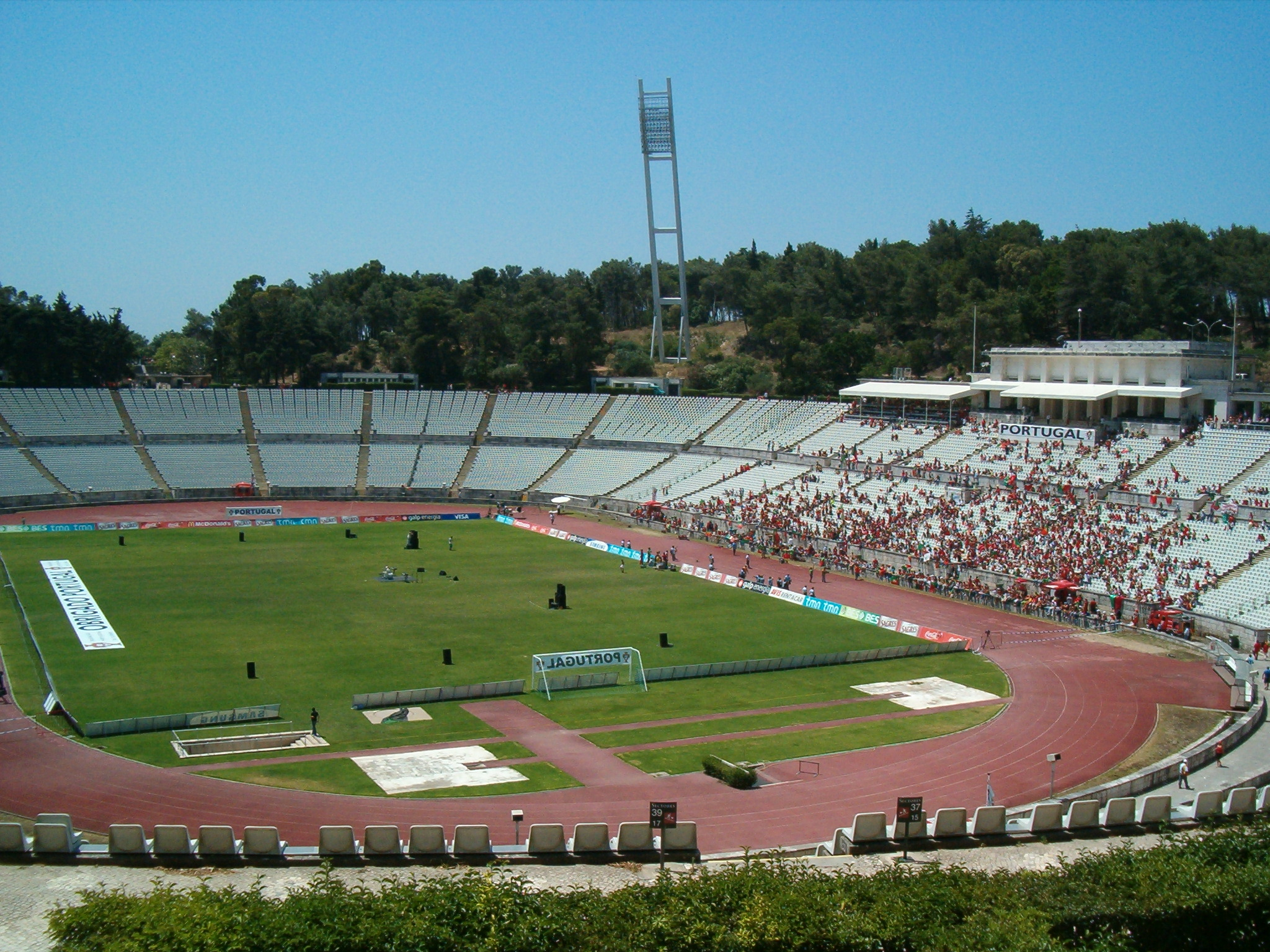
- Estádio Nacional
- Event: 2016–17 Taça de Portugal
Benfica	Vitória de Guimarães
2	1
- Date: 28 May 2017
- Venue: Estádio Nacional, Oeiras
- Man of the Match: Eduardo Salvio (Benfica)
- Fair Player of the Match: Pedro Henrique (Vitória de Guimarães)
- Referee: Hugo Miguel (Lisbon)
- Attendance: 35,390
- Weather: Overcast

The 2017 Taça de Portugal final was the final match of the 2016–17 Taça de Portugal, which decided the winner of the 77th season of the Taça de Portugal. It was played on 28 May 2017 at the Estádio Nacional in Oeiras, between Benfica and Vitória de Guimarães.

Benfica won the Portuguese Cup for a record 26th time and made its 11th double (record – previously in 2014) by also winning the League.

Vitória de Guimarães qualified for the 2017–18 UEFA Europa League by reaching the final, as Benfica had already qualified for the UEFA Champions League via their league result. As Benfica won the 2016–17 Primeira Liga, Vitória de Guimarães will play against them in the 2017 Supertaça Cândido de Oliveira as the Taça de Portugal representative.

The final was broadcast in Portugal on television by RTP (on RTP1), who holds the rights for several Portuguese Football Federation properties (which includes the Taça de Portugal final, the Supertaça Cândido de Oliveira and the Portugal national football team exhibition matches), and by SportTV (on SportTV 1) who holds the rights to broadcast the whole Taça de Portugal. RTP also broadcast the match worldwide, on RTP Internacional and on Portuguese-speaking Africa on RTP África.

== Final ==
Benfica	Vitória de Guimarães

28 May 2017
17:15 WEST

Benfica	2–1	Vitória de Guimarães
Grimaldo (yellow card) 45+4'; Jiménez 48' (yellow card) 48'; Salvio 53'; Samaris (yellow card) 69'	Report	Gaspar (yellow card) 19'; Marega (yellow card) 21'; Zungu 78'; Sá (yellow card) 88'

Estádio Nacional, Oeiras
Attendance: 35,390
Referee: Hugo Miguel (Lisbon)

== See also ==
- 2016–17 S.L. Benfica season
- 2016–17 Vitória S.C. season
- 2017 Taça da Liga final
