= Nadson =

Nadson can refer to:

- Alexander Nadson (1926–2015), Apostolic Visitor for the Belarusian Greek Catholic Church
- Georgii Nadson (1867–1939), Soviet biologist
- Semyon Nadson (1862–1887), Russian poet
- Nádson (footballer, born 1982), Nádson Rodrigues de Souza, Brazilian footballer
- Nadson (footballer, born 1984), José Nadson Ferreira, Brazilian footballer
- Nádson (footballer, born 1989), Nádson da Silva Almeida, Brazilian footballer
- Nádson (footballer, born 1992), Nádson Alves Viana, Brazilian footballer
- Nadson (footballer, born 2009), Nadson Juan Maia da Silva de Souza, Brazilian footballer
