= Pirata =

Pirata may refer to:

- Pirata (Litfiba album), 1989
- Pirata (Jão album), 2021
- Pirata (footballer) (born 1987), a Portuguese footballer
- Pirata (graphic novel), a graphic novel by Pol Medina, Jr
- Pirata (spider), a genus of wolf spiders
- Il pirata, an 1827 opera by Vincenzo Bellini
- Marco Pantani (1970–2004), Italian cyclist, nicknamed Il Pirata

- Il Pirata: Marco Pantani, a 2007 television film about the cyclist

- Pirate Party (Spain) (PIRATA), a political party in Spain
- Prediction and Research Moored Array in the Atlantic, an acronym for a network of buoys

== See also ==
- Pirate (disambiguation)
