= C.F. Santa Iria =

Portuguese sports club

- Full name: Clube de Futebol de Santa Iria
- Founded: 1941
- Ground: Campo Conde Mendia, São Julião do Tojal, Loures
- Capacity: 1500
- League: Pró-Nacional AF Lisboa
- 2020–21: 12th of 20

Clube de Futebol de Santa Iria is a Portuguese sports club from Santa Iria de Azoia, Loures. The men's football team competes in the Pró-Nacional AF Lisboa.

== History ==
The team played on the third-tier Campeonato de Portugal in 2018–19, but were instantly relegated.

In the Taça de Portugal, Santa Iria notably reached the third round in both 2016–17 and 2018–19.
