= Atabu =

Bissau-Guinean football player

Personal information
- Full name: Vlamecir Nunes Fernandes
- Date of birth: 20 June 1986 (age 40)
- Place of birth: Bissau, Guinea-Bissau
- Height: 1.87 m (6 ft 1 1/2 in)
- Positions: Midfielder; defender

Team information
- Current team: Olhanense
- Number: 5

Senior career*
Years	Team	Apps	(Gls)
2005–2008	Louletano		
2008–2009	Juventude Campinense		
2009–2011	Lagoa		
2011–2012	Farense	5	(1)
2012–2013	Lusitanos		
2013–2014	Farense	12	(0)
2014	Operário	12	(0)
2014–2015	Louletano	9	(0)
2015–2016	Almancilense	35	(2)
2017	Armacenenses	11	(0)
2017–2018	Almancilense	28	(2)
2018–	Olhanense	2	(0)
- * Club domestic league appearances and goals as of 5 December 2017

Vlamecir Nunes Fernandes, known as Atabu (born 20 June 1986) is a Bissau-Guinean football player who plays for Olhanense.

== Club career ==
He made his professional debut in the Segunda Liga for Farense on 10 August 2013 in a game against Portimonense.

== Honours ==
Lusitanos

- Primera Divisió: 2012–13
