= Marocas =

Portuguese footballer (born 1988)

Personal information
- Full name: Mário Jaime Raimundo Duarte
- Date of birth: 17 February 1988 (age 38)
- Place of birth: Albufeira, Portugal
- Height: 1.81 m (5 ft 11 in)
- Position: Forward

Team information
- Current team: Imortal

Youth career
- 1998–2006: Imortal
- 2006–2007: Louletano

Senior career*
Years	Team	Apps	(Gls)
2006–2007	Louletano		
2007–2008	Imortal		
2008–2009	Messinense		
2009–2010	Silves		
2010–2011	Esperança de Lagos		
2011–2012	Camacha	20	(2)
2012–2013	Fátima	16	(3)
2013–2014	Benfica e Castelo Branco	45	(31)
2014–2015	Santa Clara	1	(0)
2014–2015	→ Benfica e Castelo Branco (loan)	29	(17)
2015–2016	Oliveirense	22	(4)
2016–2018	Vilafranquense	59	(17)
2018–2019	Louletano	31	(7)
2019–2020	Armacenenses	21	(10)
2021	Lagos	9	(5)
2021–	Imortal	45	(16)
- * Club domestic league appearances and goals as of 10:37, 1 July 2023 (UTC)

Mário Jaime Raimundo Duarte (born 17 February 1988), known as Marocas, is a Portuguese footballer who plays as a forward for Imortal D.C.

He played 23 second-tier games and scored 4 goals for Santa Clara and Oliveirense, but spent the vast majority of his career in the lower leagues

== Club career ==
Born in Albufeira, Marocas passed through several amateur clubs in his native Algarve in his early career. In the 2013–14 Campeonato Nacional de Seniores he scored 23 goals for Sport Benfica e Castelo Branco, and added three more in other competitions. Halfway through the season, he and teammate Alvarinho trained with Zawisza Bydgoszcz of Poland, but only the latter made the move permanent.

Marocas then moved to Segunda Liga club C.D. Santa Clara, but was loaned back to Castelo Branco in September 2014 for the season. He made his one professional appearance for the Azorean team on 8 August 2015 in a 1–0 loss at Vitória S.C. B, playing the final 17 minutes in place of Paulo Clemente. Twenty days later, he terminated his contract by mutual consent with a year remaining.

After a season with U.D. Oliveirense, who were relegated from the second division, Marocas signed with U.D. Vilafranquense in the third tier in 2016. On 20 November that year, he scored the only goal of a home win against Primeira Liga club F.C. Paços de Ferreira in the fourth round of the Taça de Portugal.

On 7 June 2018, Marocas returned to his native region, signing a two-year deal with former club Louletano D.C. also in the third tier. A year later, he moved on to nearby C.F. Os Armacenenses in the same league. After a spell at C.F. Esperança de Lagos, he returned to his hometown club Imortal D.C. in July 2021, with the Campeonato de Portugal now the fourth tier.
