= Marcelo Vilela =

Brazilian footballer

Personal information
- Full name: Marcelo Machado Vilela
- Date of birth: 29 March 1999 (age 27)
- Place of birth: Passos, Brazil
- Height: 1.84 m (6 ft 0 in)
- Positions: Centre-back; defensive midfielder

Team information
- Current team: Anadia
- Number: 22

Youth career
- 2016–2017: Red Bull Brasil
- 2017–2018: Vizela

Senior career*
Years	Team	Apps	(Gls)
2018–2023	Vizela	9	(0)
2018–2019	→ Vitória SC (loan)	0	(0)
2019–2021	→ Pedras Salgadas (loan)	29	(1)
2021–2022	→ Oliveira do Hospital (loan)	18	(0)
2022–2023	→ Montalegre (loan)	21	(1)
2023–	Anadia	0	(0)
- * Club domestic league appearances and goals as of 25 July 2023

Marcelo Machado Vilela (born 29 March 1999) is a Brazilian professional footballer who plays as a centre-back or defensive midfielder for Portuguese club [FC.OH] [Fc Oliveira do Hospital].

== Professional career ==
A youth product of RB Brasil and Vizela, Vilela began his senior career on successive loans with Vitória SC and Pedras Salgadas before returning to Vizela. He made his professional debut with Vizela in a 4–1 LigaPro loss to Porto B on 19 September 2019.

On 22 September 2021, he joined Oliveira do Hospital on loan. Ahead of the 2022–23 season, Vilela was loaned out to Montalegre.

At 22 July 2023, Liga 3 side Anadia announced the permanent signing of Vilela.
