= Bruno Silva (footballer, born May 1991) =

Portuguese footballer

Personal information
- Full name: Bruno Gonçalo Fernandes Silva
- Date of birth: 4 May 1991 (age 35)
- Place of birth: Faro, Portugal
- Height: 1.78 m (5 ft 10 in)
- Position: Defender

Team information
- Current team: Almancilense

Senior career*
Years	Team	Apps	(Gls)
2013–2014	Moura	28	(1)
2014	Marítimo B	1	(0)
2015	Marítimo C	2	(0)
2015–2016	Almancilense	20	(2)
2016	Louletano	2	(0)
2016–	Almancilense	19	(0)
- * Club domestic league appearances and goals as of 5 December 2017

Bruno Gonçalo Fernandes Silva (born 4 May 1991) is a professional footballer who currently plays as a fullback for Almancilense in the Campeonato de Portugal.

== Career ==
Silva was born in Faro. On 30 November 2014, he made his professional debut with Marítimo B in a 2014–15 Segunda Liga match against Santa Clara. He joined Almancilense from Martimo as a free agent in the summer of 2015. Since then, he has played 18 games for the club, scoring 2 goals.
