= George Jackson (footballer, born 1987) =

Brazilian footballer

Personal information
- Full name: George Jackson dos Santos Souza
- Date of birth: 5 January 1987 (age 39)
- Place of birth: Rio de Janeiro, Brazil
- Height: 1.77 m (5 ft 10 in)
- Positions: Defender; forward

Youth career
- 2003: CFZ do Rio
- 2004: Olaria
- 2005–2006: Tigres do Brasil
- 2007: Vasco da Gama

Senior career*
Years	Team	Apps	(Gls)
2007–2011	Tocha		
2011–2012	Tondela	3	(1)
2012	→ Oliveira de Frades (loan)	11	(6)
2012–2013	Ayia Napa	13	(1)
2014–2015	Louletano	25	(0)
2015–2016	Castrense	23	(1)
2016–2017	Armacenenses	31	(5)
2017–2018	Esperança de Lagos		
2018–2020	Silves	39	(7)
- * Club domestic league appearances and goals as of 1 August 2020

George Jackson dos Santos Souza (born 5 January 1987), known as George Jackson, is a Brazilian football player.

== Club career ==
He made his professional debut in the Cypriot First Division for Ayia Napa on 2 September 2012 in a game against Omonia.
