= Semyon Nadson =

Russian poet (1862–1887)

Semyon Yakovlevich Nadson
- Семён Яковлевич Надсон
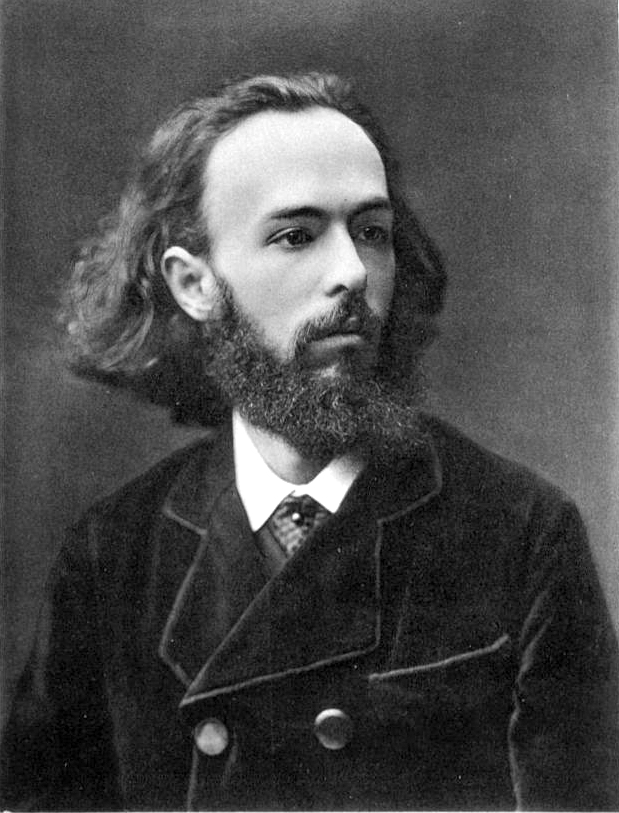
- Semyon Nadson in 1855
- Born: 14 December 1862; Saint Petersburg
- Died: 19 January 1887 (aged 24); Yalta
- Occupations: Poet; essayist

Semyon Yakovlevich Nadson (Russian: Семён Я́ковлевич На́дсон; 14 December 1862 – 19 January 1887) was a Russian poet and essayist. He is noted for being the first Jewish poet to achieve national fame in the Russian Empire.

== Biography ==
Nadson's father was a Jew who converted to Greek Orthodoxy, and was a civil servant in St. Petersburg. When Nadson was two years old, his father died in a lunatic asylum. His mother, Antonina Stepanovna Mamontova, was the offspring of an old noble Russian Orthodox family, the Mamontovs. She supported her family by working as a housekeeper and teacher. She later remarried and settled in Kiev. When she died of tuberculosis in 1873, Nadson became the ward of his uncle, I.S. Mamontov, an anti-Semite. According to his account, he suffered living under his household.

Nadson studied high school in a military school. After graduating in 1879, he joined a cadet school and became a lieutenant of the 148th Caspian Regiment in 1882. When he retired in 1884, he traveled to Europe with a female companion, Maria Vatson. Upon his return to Russia, Nadson settled in Ukraine. He died of tuberculosis in Yalta in 1887. He was 24 years old.

== Works ==
Despite publishing only one book of poems, Nadson enjoyed significant success, although he was underrated by critics for long time. His Poem "Pora" ("It Is Time" in English), was set to music by Sergei Rachmaninoff (Op.14, No. 12). Some of his other poems were also incorporated into songs by Sergei Rachmaninoff, César Cui, and others. A collection of his essays called Literary Sketches was published in 1887.

Nadson's popularity reached its height during the ascension and reign of Alexander III of Russia. After the assassination of Alexander II, members of the People's Will were arrested along with the monarch's killers. Nadson's works, which focused on decay, depression, sickness, and death resonated with their sympathizers and students with antimonarchistic convictions. It crystallized the dispirited atmosphere of the period and his emphasis on the impotence of his "weak voice" in his poetry was equated with the voice of his land. He was considered Russia's most popular poet in the three decades that preceded the Russian Revolution and was the first Jew to have achieved such national renown.

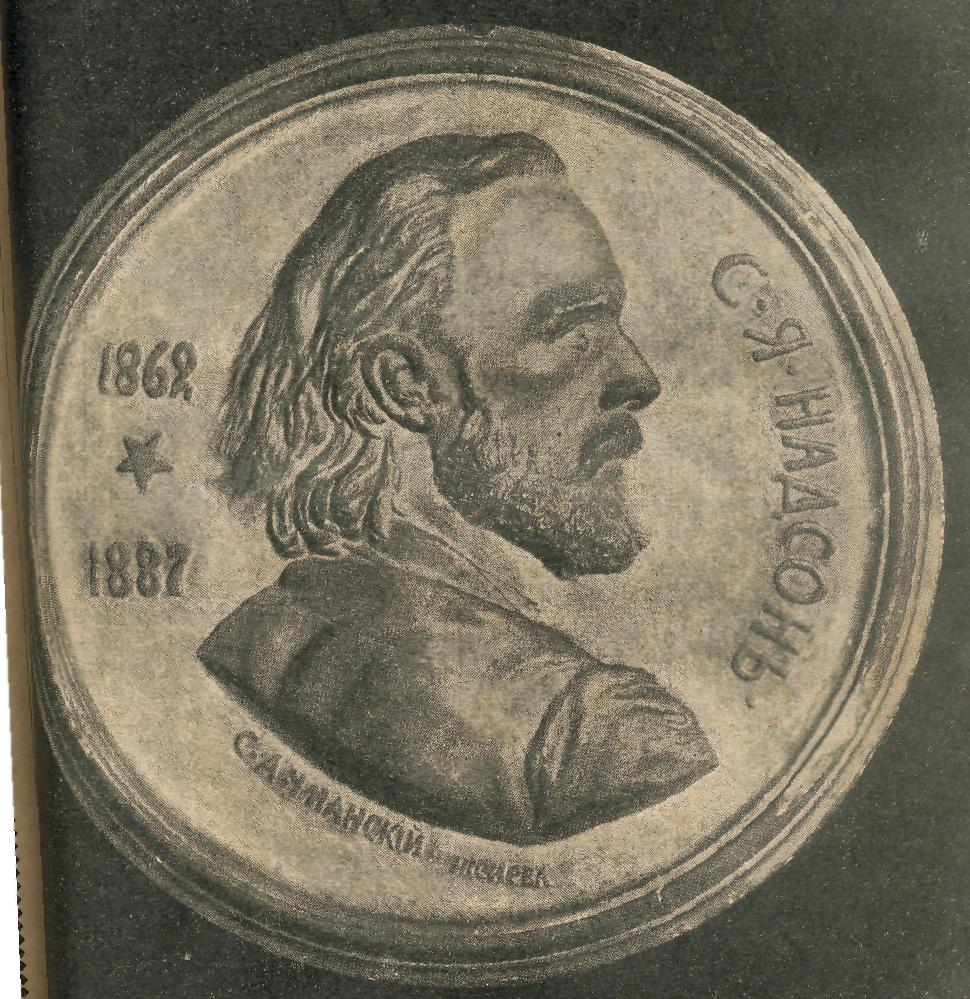
Nadson. Bas-relief-medallion by S. A. Umanskij (Geneva). The cover of "Neva"(journal) No.48-1916). 1916

== See also ==
- Nadson
