= Álex Grimaldo =

Spanish footballer (born 1995)

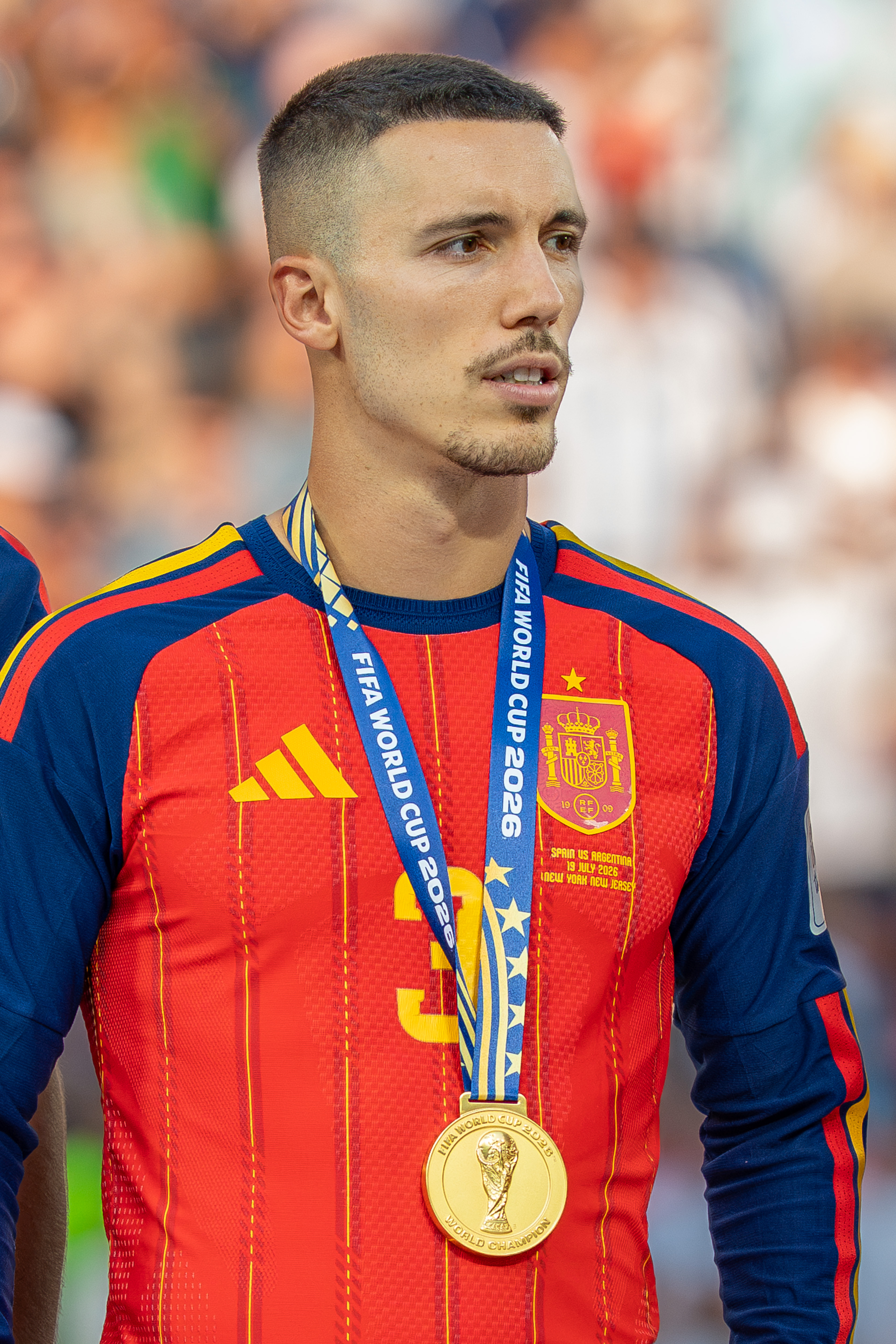
- Grimaldo with Spain in 2026

Personal information
- Full name: Alejandro Grimaldo García
- Date of birth: 20 September 1995 (age 31)
- Place of birth: Valencia, Spain
- Height: 1.71 m (5 ft 7 in)
- Positions: Left wing-back; left-back

Team information
- Current team: Atlético Madrid
- Number: 22

Youth career
- Atlético Valbonense
- 2006–2008: Valencia
- 2008–2012: Barcelona

Senior career*
Years	Team	Apps	(Gls)
2011–2015	Barcelona B	92	(6)
2016–2023	Benfica	197	(19)
2023–2026	Bayer Leverkusen	94	(20)
2026–	Atlético Madrid	12	(5)

International career^{‡}
2011	Spain U16	2	(0)
2011–2012	Spain U17	8	(1)
2012–2014	Spain U19	9	(0)
2013–2016	Spain U21	2	(0)
2023–	Spain	14	(0)
Medal record
Men's football
Representing Spain
FIFA World Cup
Winner	2026 Canada–Mexico–US
UEFA European Championship
Winner	2024 Germany
UEFA Nations League
Runner-up	2025 Germany
UEFA European Under-19 Championship
Winner	2012 Estonia
- * Club domestic league appearances and goals as of 17:10, 22 November 2026 (UTC) ‡ National team caps and goals as of 23:20, 9 June 2026 (UTC)

Alejandro "Álex" Grimaldo García (born 20 September 1995) is a Spanish professional footballer who plays as a left wing-back for La Liga club Atlético Madrid and the Spain national team.

== Club career ==
=== Barcelona ===
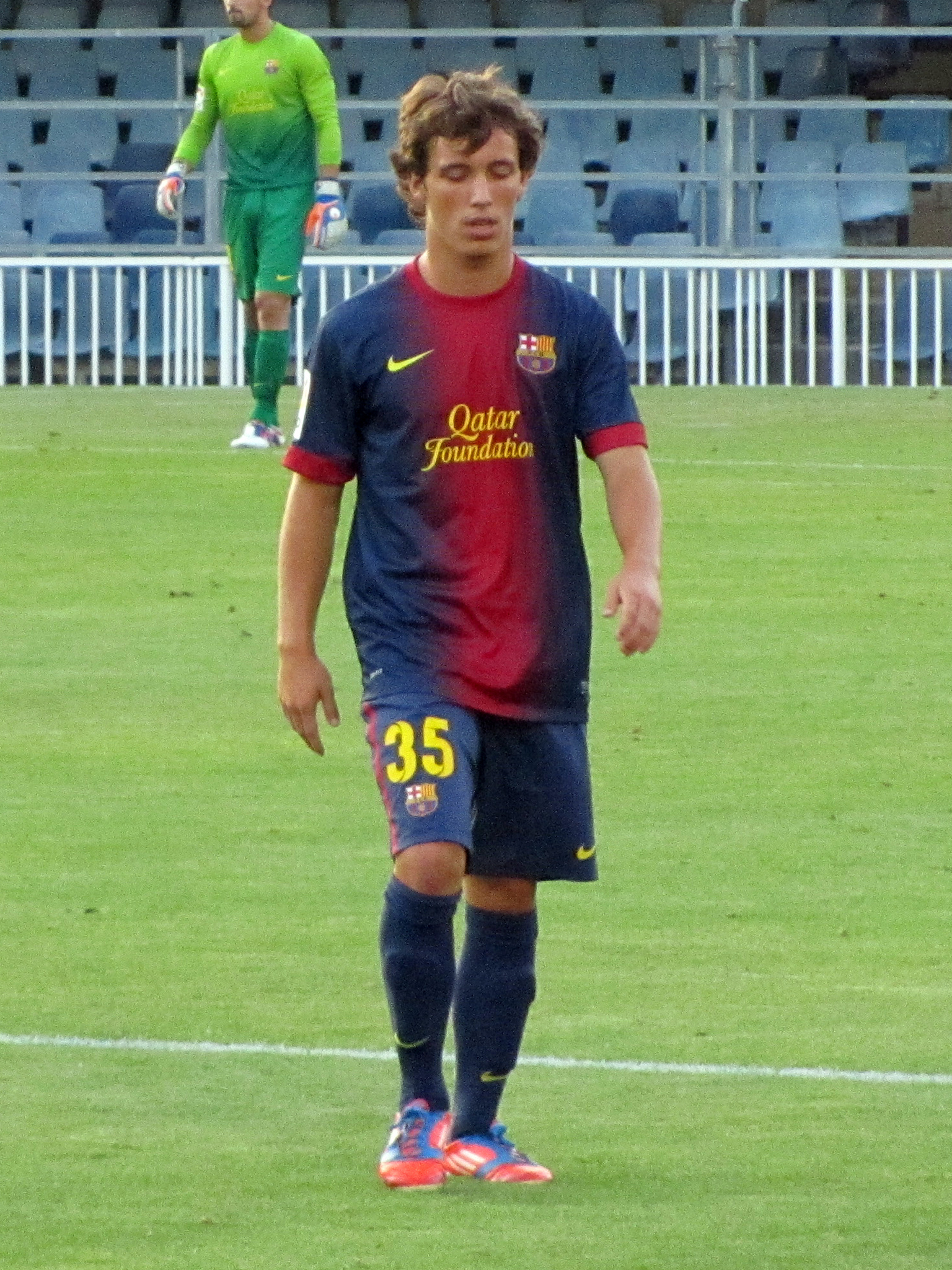
Grimaldo playing for Barcelona B in 2012

Born in Valencia, Valencian Community, Grimaldo joined Barcelona's youth system in 2008. He made his official debut for the B-team on 4 September 2011, starting in a 4–0 away win against Cartagena at the age of 15 years and 349 days and becoming the youngest player ever to appear in a Segunda División game, before he was surpassed by Lamine Yamal in 2023.

On 23 February 2013, Grimaldo suffered a serious knee injury, being ruled out for the remainder of the season. He returned to action in January of the following year, appearing in 14 matches to help his team finish in third position.

On 13 September 2014, Grimaldo scored his first professional goal, netting his side's last in a 3–2 success at Alavés. In a campaign which saw the team relegated, he netted four times in 36 matches; he and Sergi Palencia were sent off on 25 April 2015, in a 2–1 win over Ponferradina at the Mini Estadi.

=== Benfica ===
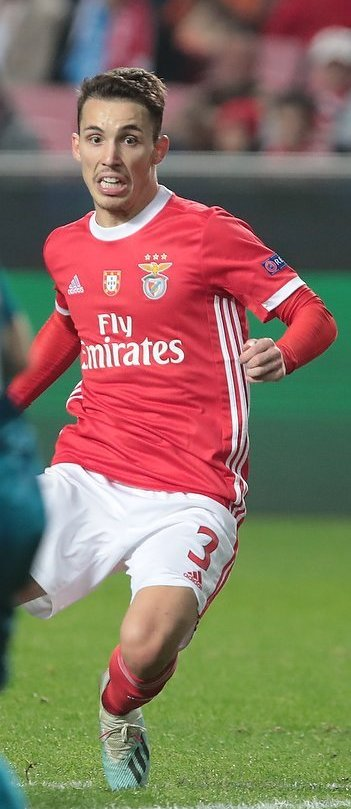
Grimaldo playing for Benfica in 2019

On 29 December 2015, as his contract was about to expire, Grimaldo signed with Primeira Liga champions Benfica until 2021, for €1.5 million. Barcelona has the right to a percentage of a future sale.

Grimaldo played his first game with his new team on 26 January 2016, coming in as a 62nd-minute substitute for Sílvio in a 6–1 away routing of Moreirense for the Taça da Liga. He debuted in the Primeira Liga on 29 February, featuring the full 90 minutes in a 2–0 home win against União da Madeira; he only appeared once more in the latter competition until the end of the season, filling in for suspended Eliseu in a 4–1 victory over Nacional also at the Estádio da Luz that sealed the club's third consecutive national championship. He remained in the team for the league cup final on 20 May, the 6–2 defeat of Marítimo at the Estádio Cidade de Coimbra.

Grimaldo's first full season began on 7 August 2016, as he started in a 3–0 win against Braga for the Supertaça Cândido de Oliveira in Aveiro, assisting Franco Cervi for the opening goal. On 2 October he scored his first goal for the club, a free kick to conclude a 4–0 home triumph over Feirense; on 28 May 2017, he played the full 90 minutes in the final of the Taça de Portugal, won after defeating Vitória de Guimarães 2–1.

Grimaldo's maiden appearance in the UEFA Champions League took place on 13 September 2016, when he played the entire 1–1 group stage home draw to Beşiktaş. His first goal in the competition came during the same stage but on 2 October 2018, in a 3–2 away win over AEK Athens; he repeated the feat against the latter opponent on 12 December in the return fixture, his 30-meter free-kick in the 88th minute helping to a 1–0 victory.

=== Bayer Leverkusen ===
On 21 May 2023, Grimaldo signed a four-year contract with Bundesliga club Bayer Leverkusen on a free transfer. On 12 August, he debuted in a DFB-Pokal match against FC Teutonia Ottensen. On 15 September, he scored his first goal for the club, a direct free kick from the edge of the box away at Bayern Munich in a 2–2 draw. On 14 April 2024, Leverkusen beat Werder Bremen 5-0 to secure the first Bundesliga title in the club's history. Grimaldo assisted the fifth goal of the game.

Grimaldo was named in the 2023–24 Bundesliga's team of the season, finishing as the top assist provider in the Bundesliga with 13 assists and being involved in more goals than any other Leverkusen player despite playing as a left-back. Grimaldo was later nominated for the 2024 Ballon d'Or for his performances in Leverkusen's unbeaten league and cup double.

On 13 September 2025, Grimaldo scored two free-kicks in a 3-1 win over Eintracht Frankfurt, in Kasper Hjulmand's first match as Leverkusen coach. This was the first time in over a decade that a player had scored two free-kicks in one Bundesliga game. On 18 October, Grimaldo scored another brace, in a 4-3 win over Mainz. He was nominated for the Bundesliga Player of The Month award for October.

=== Atlético Madrid ===
On 30 June 2026, Grimaldo signed for La Liga club Atlético Madrid, on a four-year contract worth £20 million plus add-ons.

== International career ==
Grimaldo won his first call-up for the Spain under-21 team on 5 February 2013 before he had turned 18, playing the second half of a 1–1 friendly draw in Belgium.

On 10 November 2023, Grimaldo received his first call-up to the Spain senior national team, for Euro 2024 qualifiers against Cyprus and Georgia. Six days later, he made his debut as a starter against Cyprus, assisting Mikel Oyarzabal for Spain's second goal in a 3–1 away victory.

In May 2024, Grimaldo was named in Spain's 26-man squad for the UEFA Euro 2024. He was widely expected to be a starter, but Marc Cucurella was ultimately preferred, though Grimaldo did feature in his side's 1–0 group stage win over Albania and 4–1 round of 16 victory against Georgia en route to Spain lifting the trophy.

On 25 May 2026, Grimaldo was named in Spain's squad for the 2026 FIFA World Cup. He remained an unused substitute as Spain went on to win the tournament.

== Career statistics ==
=== Club ===
As of match played 22 November 2026

Appearances and goals by club, season and competition
Club	Season	League			National cup (Note: Includes Taça de Portugal, DFB-Pokal, Copa del Rey)		League cup (Note: Includes Taça da Liga)		Europe		Other		Total	
Club	Season	Division	Apps	Goals	Apps	Goals	Apps	Goals	Apps	Goals	Apps	Goals	Apps	Goals
Barcelona B	2011–12	Segunda División	1	0	—		—		—		—		1	0
Barcelona B	2012–13	Segunda División	24	0	—		—		—		—		24	0
Barcelona B	2013–14	Segunda División	14	0	—		—		—		—		14	0
Barcelona B	2014–15	Segunda División	36	4	—		—		—		—		36	4
Barcelona B	2015–16	Segunda División B	17	2	—		—		—		—		17	2
Barcelona B	Total		92	6	—		—		—		—		92	6
Benfica	2015–16	Primeira Liga	2	0	—		3	0	0	0	—		5	0
Benfica	2016–17	Primeira Liga	14	2	2	0	0	0	4 (Note: Appearances in UEFA Champions League)	0	1 (Note: Appearance in Supertaça Cândido de Oliveira)	0	21	2
Benfica	2017–18	Primeira Liga	28	1	3	0	1	0	4	0	1	0	37	1
Benfica	2018–19	Primeira Liga	34	4	4	0	1	0	15 (Note: Ten appearances and two goals in UEFA Champions League, five appearances and one goal in UEFA Europa League)	3	—		54	7
Benfica	2019–20	Primeira Liga	26	0	6	0	0	0	8 (Note: Six appearances in UEFA Champions League, two appearances in UEFA Europa League)	0	1	1	41	1
Benfica	2020–21	Primeira Liga	31	2	4	0	0	0	7 (Note: One appearance in UEFA Champions League, six appearances in UEFA Europa League)	0	1	0	43	2
Benfica	2021–22	Primeira Liga	29	5	2	1	3	0	14	0	—		48	6
Benfica	2022–23	Primeira Liga	33	5	4	1	3	0	14	2	—		54	8
Benfica	Total		197	19	25	2	11	0	66	5	4	1	303	27
Bayer Leverkusen	2023–24	Bundesliga	33	10	6	0	—		12 (Note: Appearances in UEFA Europa League)	2	—		51	12
Bayer Leverkusen	2024–25	Bundesliga	32	2	5	0	—		10	2	1 (Note: Appearance in DFL-Supercup)	0	48	4
Bayer Leverkusen	2025–26	Bundesliga	29	8	5	2	—		12	4	—		46	14
Bayer Leverkusen	Total		94	20	16	2	—		34	8	1	0	145	30
Atlético Madrid	2026–27	La Liga	12	5	0	0	—		4	0	0	0	16	5
Career total			395	50	41	4	11	0	104	13	5	1	556	68

=== International ===
As of match played 8 June 2026

Appearances and goals by national team and year
National team	Year	Apps	Goals
Spain	2023	1	0
Spain	2024	9	0
Spain	2025	1	0
Spain	2026	3	0
Total		14	0

== Honours ==
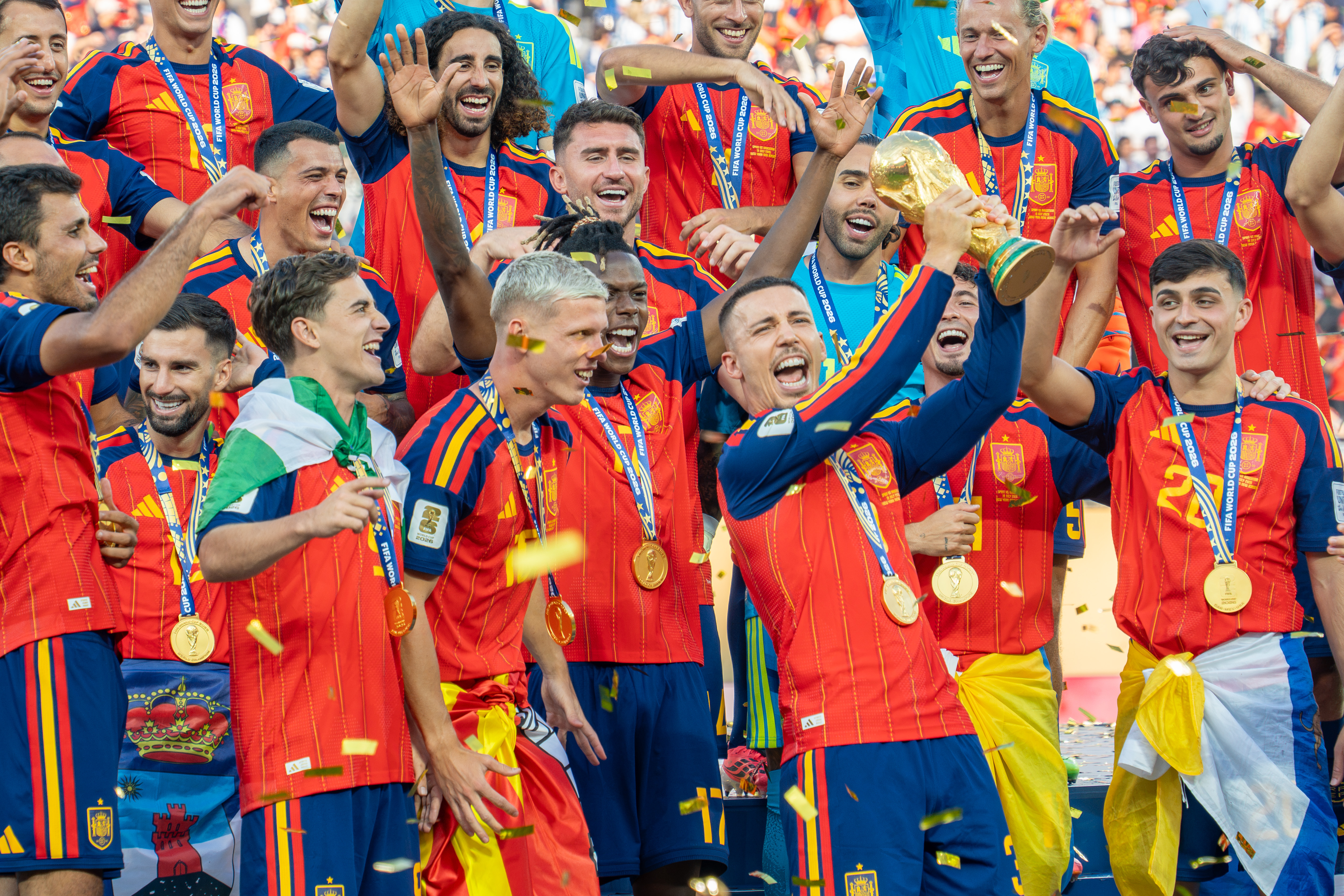
Grimaldo holding the FIFA World Cup Trophy after Spain won the 2026 final

Benfica

- Primeira Liga: 2015–16, 2016–17, 2018–19, 2022–23
- Taça de Portugal: 2016–17
- Taça da Liga: 2015–16
- Supertaça Cândido de Oliveira: 2016, 2017, 2019

Bayer Leverkusen

- Bundesliga: 2023–24
- DFB-Pokal: 2023–24
- DFL-Supercup: 2024

Spain

- FIFA World Cup: 2026
- UEFA European Championship: 2024
- UEFA Nations League runner-up: 2024–25

Spain U19

- UEFA European Under-19 Championship: 2012

Individual

- UEFA European Under-19 Championship Team of the Tournament: 2012
- UEFA Europa League Squad of the Season: 2018–19
- Primeira Liga Team of the Year: 2018–19, 2022–23
- Primeira Liga Defender of the Month: February 2019, December/January 2023, February 2023
- Primeira Liga Goal of the Month: January 2019, August 2021
- Bundesliga Team of the Season: 2023–24
- VDV Bundesliga Team of the Season: 2023–24, 2025–26
- Bundesliga Player of the Month: April 2024
- ESM Team of the Year: 2023–24
