= Rúben Neves (footballer, born 1991) =

Portuguese footballer

Personal information
- Full name: Rúben Flávio Santos das Neves
- Date of birth: 12 May 1991 (age 35)
- Place of birth: São João da Madeira, Portugal
- Height: 1.79 m (5 ft 10 1/2 in)
- Position: Midfielder

Youth career
- 1999–2010: Sanjoanense

Senior career*
Years	Team	Apps	(Gls)
2009–2012	Sanjoanense	40	(1)
2012−2013	Cinfães	29	(1)
2013–2015	Aves	45	(3)
2015–2017	Sanjoanense	46	(8)
2017	Salgueiros	8	(0)
2017	Freamunde	14	(0)
2018	Cinfães	13	(2)
2018–2019	Felgueiras 1932	23	(0)
2019–2024	Montalegre	127	(13)
2024–2025	Sanjoanense	19	(0)
Total		364	(28)
- * Club domestic league appearances and goals

Rúben Flávio Santos das Neves (born 12 May 1991) is a Portuguese former professional footballer who played as a midfielder.

== Club career ==
Born in São João da Madeira, Neves came through the ranks of hometown club A.D. Sanjoanense and made his senior debut with the team in the fourth division in 2009–10, in which his team was relegated. In 2012, he moved to C.D. Cinfães, helping them to second place in the third tier in his only season.

Afterwards, Neves enjoyed two campaigns as a professional with C.D. Aves in the Segunda Liga. He played his first match in the competition on 11 August 2013 in a 0–2 home loss against C.F. União where he featured the 90 minutes, and scored his first goal the following weekend, helping the visitors to a 1–1 draw at U.D. Oliveirense.

Neves dropped back to division three in the summer of 2015, by returning to Sanjoanense. He spent the rest of his career at that level, with S.C. Salgueiros, S.C. Freamunde, Cinfães again, F.C. Felgueiras 1932, C.D.C. Montalegre and Sanjoanense.
