= Sérgio Grilo =

Portuguese footballer

Personal information
- Full name: Sérgio Filipe Grilo das Neves
- Date of birth: 17 February 1983 (age 43)
- Place of birth: Figueira da Foz, Portugal
- Height: 1.87 m (6 ft 2 in)
- Positions: Defender; forward

Youth career
- 1992–2001: Naval

Senior career*
Years	Team	Apps	(Gls)
2000–2001	Naval	3	(0)
2001–2003	Sporting Pombal	53	(8)
2003	Sourense		
2004–2007	Pampilhosa	74	(23)
2007–2009	UD Oliveirense	28	(5)
2009–2010	Atromitos Yeroskipou	23	(3)
2010	Moreirense	0	(0)
2011	Othellos Athienou	8	(0)
2011–2012	Pampilhosa	26	(9)
2012–2013	AD Nogueirense	20	(5)
2013–2014	Carapinheirense	20	(3)
2014–2017	Naval	80	(4)

Managerial career
- 2016–2017: Naval
- * Club domestic league appearances and goals

Sérgio Filipe Grilo das Neves, known as Sérgio Grilo (born 17 February 1983) is a Portuguese retired football player. and coach.

== Career ==
He made his professional debut in the Segunda Liga for Naval on 10 December 2000 in a game against Marco.

== Personal ==
He is the older brother of Paulo Grilo.
