= Erik Moreno =

Colombian footballer (born 1991)

Personal information
- Full name: Erik Andrés Moreno Serna
- Date of birth: November 24, 1991 (age 34)
- Place of birth: Quibdó, Chocó, Colombia
- Height: 1.84 m (6 ft 1/2 in)
- Position: Forward

Team information
- Current team: St. Lucia F.C.

Youth career
- –2008: Deportivo Pereira

Senior career*
Years	Team	Apps	(Gls)
2009	Deportivo Pereira	8	(0)
2010–2013	Millonarios	78	(18)
2014–2017	Braga	8	(2)
2014	Braga B	1	(1)
2014–2015	→ Panetolikos (loan)	15	(6)
2015	→ Valladolid (loan)	1	(0)
2016	→ Tondela (loan)	25	(2)
2018	Cúcuta Deportivo	0	(0)
2018–2019	Oliveirense	18	(1)
2019	FCI Levadia II	2	(1)
2019	FCI Levadia	10	(1)
2021	Valledupar	12	(1)
2022	Cibao	3	(0)
2022–	St. Lucia	8	(0)
- * Club domestic league appearances and goals as of 18 July 2023

Erik Andrés Moreno Serna (born 24 November 1991) is a Colombian footballer who plays as a forward for Maltese side St. Lucia.

== Club career ==
Born in Quibdó, Chocó, Moreno finished his formation with Deportivo Pereira. He made his professional debut on 15 February 2009, starting in a 3–0 home triumph against Deportivo Cali.

In 2010, Moreno transferred to fellow first division side Millonarios. He only became a part of the first squad in the following year, being a key offensive unit during the year's Copa Colombia; he scored five goals in the tournament, as his side was crowned champions.

On 31 January 2014 Moreno moved abroad for the first time in his career, signing a 4 1/2-year contract with S.C. Braga. He scored his first goal for the club on 13 April, but in a 1–3 home loss against FC Porto.

On 2 September 2014 Moreno was loaned to Greek side Panetolikos, for one year. On 31 August of the following year he switched teams and countries again, after agreeing to a one-year loan deal with Real Valladolid.
