= Alexandre Cardoso =

Brazilian footballer (born 1992)

Personal information
- Full name: Alexandre Cardoso Garcia
- Date of birth: 30 April 1992 (age 34)
- Height: 1.82 m (6 ft 0 in)
- Position: Defensive midfielder

Youth career
- 2010: Vasco da Gama
- 2011: Palmeiras

Senior career*
Years	Team	Apps	(Gls)
2012–2013	Palmeiras B	23	(0)
2014	Nacional MG	4	(0)
2015	Beira-Mar	4	(0)
2015–2017	Vitória de Setúbal	0	(0)
2016–2017	Trofense (loan)	34	(3)
2017	Trofense	26	(2)
2018	Al-Nahda	17	(0)
2019	Damac	0	(0)
2019	Trofense	9	(0)
2019–2020	Al-Nahda	15	(0)
2022–2023	Boeung Ket	26	(0)
2023	UE Santa Coloma	7	(0)
2023	Nagaworld	5	(0)
- * Club domestic league appearances and goals as of 24 June 2023

Alexandre Cardoso Garcia (born 30 April 1992) is a Brazilian football player who plays for Cambodian Premier League club Nagaworld.

== Club career ==
He made his professional debut in the Campeonato Mineiro for Nacional on 22 February 2014 in a game against Tupi. In January 2015 he signed the contract with Sport Clube Beira-Mar (Portugal Second division). In summer 2015 Alexandre signed a two years contract with Vitoria de Setubal FC (Portugal Premier League). After that he played two seasons in C.D.Trofense (Campeonato de Portugal). On 25 July 2018 Alexandre joined Al-Nahda Club from Oman Professional Football League where he will work with his former coach in Portugal Mr. Bruno Pereira.
