= Clayton (footballer, born 1987) =

Brazilian footballer

Personal information
- Full name: Clayton Bezerra Leite
- Date of birth: 3 July 1987 (age 39)
- Place of birth: Diadema, Brazil
- Height: 1.87 m (6 ft 2 in)
- Position: Midfielder

Team information
- Current team: Benfica e Castelo Branco
- Number: 99

Senior career*
Years	Team	Apps	(Gls)
2008	Cambé		
2009	Hồ Chí Minh City		
2011	Ha Noi		
2012	Matsubara		
2012–2013	Feirense	11	(0)
2013–2014	Chaves	31	(2)
2014–2016	Académico de Viseu	69	(9)
2016–2018	UD Oliveirense	40	(0)
2018–2019	Mirandela	32	(5)
2019–	Benfica e Castelo Branco	8	(0)
- * Club domestic league appearances and goals as of 22:06, 11 November 2019 (UTC)

Clayton Bezerra Leite (born 3 July 1987), known as Clayton, is a Brazilian football player who plays for Sport Benfica e Castelo Branco.

== Club career ==
He made his professional debut in the Segunda Liga for Feirense on 11 August 2012 in a game against Belenenses.
