= Vítor Hugo (footballer, born 1985) =

Portuguese footballer

Personal information
- Full name: Vítor Hugo Ribeiro Costa
- Date of birth: 4 November 1985 (age 41)
- Place of birth: Vila Nova de Famalicão, Portugal
- Height: 1.77 m (5 ft 9 1/2 in)
- Position: Forward

Team information
- Current team: Pevidém SC
- Number: 9

Senior career*
Years	Team	Apps	(Gls)
2005–2007	Joane		
2007	Ribeirão		
2008	AD Oliveirense		
2008–2009	Tirsense		
2009–2010	Desportivo das Aves	4	(0)
2010–2012	Tirsense	28	(6)
2012–2013	Vizela	30	(6)
2013–2015	Varzim	47	(13)
2016	Vilaverdense	11	(1)
2016–2017	AD Oliveirense	30	(11)
2017–2018	Merelinense	24	(7)
2018–	Pevidén	64	(22)
- * Club domestic league appearances and goals as of 15 April 2017

Vítor Hugo Ribeiro Costa, known as Vítor Hugo (born 4 November 1985) is a Portuguese football player who plays for Pevidém SC.

== Club career ==
He made his professional debut in the Segunda Liga for Desportivo das Aves on 7 January 2010 in a game against Santa Clara.
