= Tino (footballer, born 1988) =

Cape Verdean footballer

Personal information
- Full name: Cesaltino Mendes Santos
- Date of birth: 18 April 1988 (age 38)
- Place of birth: Santa Cruz, Cape Verde
- Height: 1.85 m (6 ft 1 in)
- Position: Forward

Senior career*
Years	Team	Apps	(Gls)
2009–2010	Sintra Football		
2010–2011	1º Dezembro		
2011–2015	Sintra Football		
2015	Vitória de Sernache	5	(0)
2016	Aljustrelense	14	(10)
2017	Leixões	19	(2)
2017	Casa Pia	12	(5)
2018	Sintrense	9	(1)
2019–?	Sintra Football		
- * Club domestic league appearances and goals

Cesaltino Mendes Santos (born 18 April 1988), known as Tino, is a Cape Verdean football player.

== Club career ==
He made his professional debut in the Segunda Liga for Leixões on 8 January 2017 in a game against União da Madeira.
