= Xavi (Portuguese footballer) =

Portuguese footballer (born 1983)

Personal information
- Full name: Cristiano Xavier Gonçalves Carvalho
- Date of birth: 13 March 1983 (age 43)
- Place of birth: Fafe, Portugal
- Height: 1.83 m (6 ft 0 in)
- Position: Defender

Youth career
- 1994-1995: Desportivo Ases de São Jorge
- 1995-2002: Fafe

Senior career*
| Years | Team | Apps | (Gls) |
| 2002–2017 | Fafe | 172 | (13) |
- * Club domestic league appearances and goals

Cristiano Xavier Gonçalves Carvalho, known as Xavi (born 13 March 1983) is a Portuguese football player who played for Fafe as a defender.

== Club career ==
Xavi did not appear for Fafe until the 2010–11 season. He made his professional debut in the Segunda Liga on March 6, 2011 in a game against GD Ribeirão.
