= Vinícius (Portuguese footballer) =

Portuguese footballer

Personal information
- Full name: José Pedro Ferradeira dos Santos
- Date of birth: 24 January 1995 (age 31)
- Place of birth: Póvoa de Varzim, Portugal
- Height: 1.92 m (6 ft 3 1/2 in)
- Position: Centre back

Team information
- Current team: Anadia
- Number: 4

Youth career
- 2008–2012: Porto
- 2010–2011: → Padroense (loan)
- 2012–2014: Varzim

Senior career*
Years	Team	Apps	(Gls)
2013–2014	Varzim	19	(0)
2014−2016	Académico Viseu	2	(0)
2015–2016	→ AD Oliveirense (loan)	13	(0)
2016	→ Coimbrões (loan)	9	(0)
2016–2017	Sanjoanense	23	(2)
2017–2018	Vilaverdense	15	(0)
2018–2021	Penafiel	36	(3)
2021–	Anadia	1	(1)

International career
2011	Portugal U16	2	(0)
2012	Portugal U17	1	(0)
- * Club domestic league appearances and goals as of 28 August 2021

José Pedro Ferradeira dos Santos (born 24 January 1995) known as Vinícius, is a Portuguese footballer who plays for Anadia as a defender.

== Football career ==
On 23 August 2014, Vinícius made his professional debut with Académico Viseu in a 2014–15 Segunda Liga match against Benfica B.

== Personal ==
He is the younger brother of Tó Barbosa.
