= Rúben Silvestre =

Portuguese footballer (born 1994)

Personal information
- Full name: Rúben Filipe Quintano Silvestre
- Date of birth: 21 January 1994 (age 32)
- Place of birth: Tondela, Portugal
- Height: 1.85 m (6 ft 1 in)
- Position: Forward

Team information
- Current team: São João Ver

Youth career
- 2006–2007: Os Pestinhas
- 2007–2013: Tondela

Senior career*
Years	Team	Apps	(Gls)
2013–2015	Tondela	10	(0)
2013	→ Tourizense (loan)	13	(2)
2015	→ Tourizense (loan)	13	(2)
2015–2016	Sertanense	28	(3)
2016	Gafanha	10	(2)
2017–2018	Oțelul Galați	13	(4)
2018–2020	Anadia	52	(8)
2020–	São João Ver	24	(1)
- * Club domestic league appearances and goals as of 4 September 2021

Rúben Filipe Quintano Silvestre (born 21 January 1994) is a Portuguese footballer who plays as a forward.

== Club career ==
He made his professional debut in the Segunda Liga for Tondela on 12 January 2014 in a game against Sporting Covilhã.
