= U.D. Vilafranquense =

Portuguese association football club

- Full name: União Desportiva Vilafranquense
- Nickname(s): Piranhas do Tejo (Tagus Piranhas)
- Founded: 12 April 1957; 68 years ago
- Ground: Campo do Cevadeiro
- Capacity: 2,500
- Chairman: Elias Barquete Albarrello
- 2022–23: Liga Portugal 2, 7th of 18
- Website: www.udvfutsad.com
Home colours	Away colours

União Desportiva Vilafranquense is a Portuguese football club from Vila Franca de Xira, Lisbon District.

The team currently compete in the 3rd division of Lisbon Football Association, equivalent to the 7th Portuguese division. The team competed in Liga Portugal 2, the second tier of the Portuguese football league system, until 2023–24 but after suffered a split between U.D. Vilafranquense (club) and Vilafranquense SAD, the SAD relocated to Vila das Aves after the 2022-23 Liga Portugal 2, rebranding itself as AVS Futebol SAD and adopting the defunct Desportivo das Aves's facilities and colours.

The other only time when the club had played in the second tier was in 1987–88 season, when that level was still regionalised.

== History ==
The club was created on April 12, 1957, with the merger between four local sports clubs: Grupo de Foot-Ball Operário Vilafranquense, Águia Sport Club Vilafranquense, Hóquei Clube Vilafranquense and Ginásio Vilafranquense.

In the 2016–17 Taça de Portugal, Vilafranquense defeated G.S. Loures, Vilaverdense F.C. and G.D. Vitória de Sernache to reach a fourth-round tie at home to F.C. Paços de Ferreira of the Primeira Liga. They beat the top-flight team 1–0 on 20 November, with a goal by Marocas. In the next round (last 16), they lost by the same score at Vitória S.C., also of the Primeira.

In the 2018–19 Campeonato de Portugal, Vilafranquense came second in Serie C behind U.D. Leiria. In the play-offs, they dispatched Lusitânia F.C. and then Leiria on penalties to win promotion. This was the club's first time in a national second division. On 23 June in the final at the Estádio Nacional against Casa Pia A.C., the club drew 2–2 then lost 4–2 on penalties.

Due to the inadequate facilities of their Campo do Cevadeiro, Vilafranquense had to play their LigaPro home games 50 kilometres away at the Estádio Municipal in Rio Maior.

At end of 2022–23 season, UD Vilafranquense (club) and Vilafranquense SAD went their separate ways, the SAD relocate to Aves and became a new club, AVS Futebol SAD from 2023 to 2024, maintaining their place in the Liga Portugal 2, while UD Vilafranquense (club) restarted in the 3rd division of Lisbon Football Association, equivalent to the 7th Portuguese division, similar to what happened to C.F. Os Belenenses years before.
