= C.D.C. Montalegre =

Portuguese sport and football club

CDC Montalegre
- Full name: Centro Desportivo e Cultural de Montalegre
- Founded: 23 November 1964; 60 years ago
- Ground: Dr. Diogo Alves Vaz Pereira, Montalegre, Portugal
- Capacity: 5,000
- Chairman: Paulo Jorge Luís dos Reis Viage
- Manager: José Manuel Viage
- League: Campeonato de Portugal
- 2022–23: Liga 3: Relegated
Home colours	Away colours

Centro Desportivo e Cultural de Montalegre is a Portuguese sport and football club based in the parish of Montalegre in the Vila Real District. It was founded in 1964 and currently plays in the Liga 3, third tier of Portuguese football. They currently play at the Estádio Dr. Diogo Alves Vaz Pereira.

== Current squad ==
As of 15 January 2023

Note: Flags indicate national team as defined under FIFA eligibility rules; some limited exceptions apply. Players may hold more than one non-FIFA nationality.

No.	Pos.	Nation	Player
1	GK	(Portugal) POR	Nuno Rafael
2	DF	(Portugal) POR	Miguel Mota
3	DF	(Portugal) POR	Manu Ribeiro
4	MF	(Canada) CAN	Rohun Kawale
6	MF	(Brazil) BRA	Luan Sérgio
7	MF	(Portugal) POR	Lio
8	MF	(Brazil) BRA	Marcelo Vilela
9	FW	(Guinea-Bissau) GNB	Edmilson Mendes
10	MF	(Portugal) POR	Diogo Teixeira
11	FW	(Angola) ANG	Bruno Rodrigues
12	GK	(Brazil) BRA	Jeimes Menezes
20	MF	(Portugal) POR	Rodrigo Ferreira

No.	Pos.	Nation	Player
21	MF	(Portugal) POR	Rúben Neves
22	FW	(Portugal) POR	Bruninho
24	FW	(Portugal) POR	Didi
26	DF	(Portugal) POR	Kiko
27	FW	(Portugal) POR	Bruno Guimarães
29	FW	(Portugal) POR	André Dias
30	DF	(Senegal) SEN	Zack
33	MF	(Guinea-Bissau) GNB	Lassana Mané
38	DF	(Portugal) POR	Rui Bruno
65	GK	(Portugal) POR	Diogo Figueiredo
77	FW	(Portugal) POR	Guilherme Pio
92	DF	(Brazil) BRA	Victor Massaia
99	MF	(Senegal) SEN	Baba Sow
