= Nádson (footballer, born 1992) =

Brazilian footballer

Personal information
- Full name: Nádson Alves Viana
- Date of birth: 21 February 1992 (age 34)
- Place of birth: Salvador, Brazil
- Height: 1.79 m (5 ft 10 1/2 in)
- Position: Forward

Team information
- Current team: Gafanha

Senior career*
Years	Team	Apps	(Gls)
2014	Bahia	1	(0)
2014–2015	Beira-Mar	40	(7)
2015–2016	Atlético CP	24	(0)
2016–	Gafanha	14	(6)
- * Club domestic league appearances and goals as of 15 April 2017

Nádson Alves Viana, known as Nádson (born 21 February 1992) is a Brazilian football player who plays for Gafanha.

== Club career ==
He made his professional debut in the Segunda Liga for Beira-Mar on 12 August 2014 in a game against União da Madeira.
