= Pirata (footballer) =

Portuguese footballer

Personal information
- Full name: Sérgio Filipe Santos Oliveira
- Date of birth: 1 February 1987 (age 39)
- Place of birth: Ovar, Portugal
- Height: 1.88 m (6 ft 2 in)
- Position: Forward

Youth career
- 2005–2006: Ovarense

Senior career*
| Years | Team | Apps | (Gls) |
| 2006 | Ovarense | 5 | (1) |
| 2006–2007 | Tocha | | |
| 2007–2008 | Sanjoanense | | |
| 2008 | Joane | 11 | (2) |
| 2009 | Anadia | 11 | (0) |
| 2009–2010 | Avanca | 19 | (2) |
| 2010–2011 | Fiães | 26 | (5) |
| 2011–2013 | Mansores | | |
| 2013 | Bustelo | 6 | (1) |
| 2013–2014 | Mansores | 17 | (16) |
| 2014–2015 | Alvarenga | 22 | (19) |
| 2015 | União Lamas | 5 | (3) |
| 2015–2016 | Alvarenga | 3 | (5) |
| 2016–2017 | Beira-Mar | 21 | (7) |
| 2017–2018 | Lusitânia Lourosa | 16 | (2) |
| 2018 | Ovarense | 9 | (6) |
| 2019 | União Lamas | 11 | (3) |
- * Club domestic league appearances and goals

Sérgio Filipe Santos Oliveira (born 1 February 1987), known as Pirata, is a Portuguese former professional footballer who played as a forward.

== Career ==
Pirata made his professional debut in the Segunda Liga for Ovarense on 12 March 2006 in a game against Gondomar.
