= S.R. Almancilense =

Association football club in Portugal

Almancilense
- Full name: Sociedade Recreativa Almancilense
- Founded: 1935; 91 years ago
- Ground: Estádio Municipal de Almancil, Portugal
- Capacity: 1,500
- Chairman: Cesário Alcaria Vieira
- Head Coach: Felipe Sousa
- League: Campeonato de Portugal
- 2016–17: Campeonato de Portugal; First stage (Serie H): 6th Second stage - Relegation groups (Serie H): 5th
Home colours

Sociedade Recreativa Almancilense (abbreviated as SR Almancilense) is a Portuguese football club based in Almancil, Loulé.

== History ==
SR Almancilense currently play in the Campeonato de Portugal, which is the third tier of Portuguese football. The club was founded in 1935; they play their home matches at the Estádio Municipal de Almancil in Almancil.

The club is affiliated to Algarve Football Association.

== Players ==
=== Current squad ===
As of 5 December 2017

Note: Flags indicate national team as defined under FIFA eligibility rules; some limited exceptions apply. Players may hold more than one non-FIFA nationality.

No.	Pos.	Nation	Player
—	GK	CPV	Nelson Cruz
—	GK	BRA	Ravi Paschoa
—	DF	BRA	Anselmo
—	DF	BRA	Caíque Machado
—	DF	POR	Bruno Silva
—	DF	POR	Tiago Sousa
—	DF	POR	Ivan Silva
—	DF	POR	Nuno Pires
—	MF	BRA	Paulo Teixeira
—	MF	BRA	Carlos Henrique
—	MF	BRA	Erick

No.	Pos.	Nation	Player
—	MF	GBS	Atabu
—	MF	POR	Vila
—	MF	BRA	Mateus Júnior
—	FW	GHA	Isaac Boakye (on loan from Portimonense)
—	FW	POR	Cláudio Carvalho
—	FW	BRA	Fábio Martins
—	FW	POR	André Matias
—	FW	NGR	Adewele Sapara
—	FW	BRA	Luã Portugal
—	FW	POR	Edinho Junior

== Honours ==
=== League ===
- Algarve Football Association Division One
  - Winners (3): 1987–88, 1997–98, 2014–15
- Algarve Football Association Division Two
  - Winners (1): 1996–97

=== Cups ===
- Algarve Football Association Taça do Algarve
  - Winners (1): 2015–16

== See also ==
- S.R. Almancilense players
- S.R. Almancilense managers
