= Lisbon Football Association =

Governing body of football in Lisbon

- Sport: Football
- Jurisdiction: Lisbon, Portugal
- Membership: 93
- Founded: 1910

Official website
- www.afl.pt

The Lisbon Football Association (Associação de Futebol de Lisboa; abbr. AF Lisboa) is the district governing body for the all football competitions in the Portuguese district of Lisbon. It is also the regulator of the clubs registered in the district.

== Notable clubs in the Lisbon FA ==
=== Primeira Liga ===
- Benfica
- Sporting CP
- Casa Pia
- Estoril
- Estrela Amadora

=== Liga Portugal 2 ===
- Alverca
- Mafra
- Vilafranquense
- Torreense
- Belenenses

=== Liga 3 ===
- Real
- Atlético CP
- 1° de Dezembro
- Pêro Pinheiro

=== Campeonato de Portugal ===
- Real S.C.
- Sintrense

=== AF Lisboa ===
- Oriental

== All-time Primeira Liga table ==
These are the most successful Lisbon FA clubs in the history of Primeira Liga (as of 02/2021):

Pos	Team	S	Pts	GP	W	D	L	GF	GA	GD	1st	2nd	3rd	4th	5th	6th	T	Debut	Since/ Last App	Best
1	Benfica	86	5446	2432	1664	454	314	5882	2136	3746	37	29	15	4	–	1	86	1934–35	1934–35	1
2	Sporting CP	86	5011	2432	1501	508	423	5294	2320	2974	18	21	29	13	4	–	85	1934–35	1934–35	1
3	Belenenses	77	3158	2146	877	527	742	3352	2745	607	1	3	14	9	8	8	43	1934–35	2017–18	1
4	Estoril	26	912	772	239	195	338	1044	1231	-187	–	–	–	2	3	–	5	1944–45	2017–18	4
5	Atlético CP	24	710	632	192	134	306	976	1285	-309	–	–	2	1	1	3	7	1943–44	1976–77	3
6	Estrela da Amadora	16	608	540	144	176	220	521	680	-159	–	–	–	–	–	–	–	1988–89	2008–09	7
7	Oriental	7	187	190	50	37	103	224	438	-214	–	–	–	–	1	–	1	1950–51	1974–75	5
8	Alverca	5	181	170	48	37	85	192	266	-74	–	–	–	–	–	–	–	1998–99	2003–04	11
9	Torreense	6	163	164	44	31	89	183	316	-133	–	–	–	–	–	–	–	1955–56	1991–92	7
10	Belenenses SAD	2	78	68	19	21	28	69	105	-36	–	–	–	–	–	–	–	2018–19	2018–19	9
11	Carcavelinhos	5	69	82	19	12	51	103	223	-120	–	–	–	1	–	1	2	1935–36	1941–42	4
12	Unidos de Lisboa	3	62	54	18	8	28	151	145	6	–	–	–	1	–	–	1	1940–41	1942–43	4
13	União de Lisboa	1	11	14	3	2	9	30	49	-19	–	–	–	–	–	1	1	1934–35	1934–35	6
14	Casa Pia	1	3	14	1	0	13	12	56	-44	–	–	–	–	–	–	–	1938–39	1938–39	8

== See also ==
- Lisbon Championship
- Portuguese District Football Associations
- Portuguese football competitions
- List of football clubs in Portugal
