= AC Malveira =

Portuguese football club

- Full name: Atlético Clube da Malveira
- Founded: 1940; 86 years ago
- Ground: Estádio das Seixas; Mafra, Portugal
- Capacity: 4,000
- League: Campeonato de Portugal
- Website: www.acmalveira.pt/pt/

Atlético Clube da Malveira is a Portuguese football club located in Mafra, Portugal, that currently plays in the Campeonato de Portugal, in the fourth tier.

== History ==
AC da Malveira was formed in 1940 from the merger of Grupo Desportivo Recreativo Os Malveirenses and Orquestra Típica da Malveira.

For the 2022–23 season, Belenenses SAD who will play in the second tier Liga Portugal 2 after being relegated from the top tier Primeira Liga, reached an agreement to use Malveira's Estádio das Seixas as their home ground.
