= C.F. Os Armacenenses =

Portuguese association football club

CF Armacenenses
- Full name: Clube de Futebol Os Armacenenses
- Founded: 1935; 91 years ago
- Ground: Estádio Municipal de Armação de Pêra; Armação de Pêra, Silves; Portugal
- Capacity: 1,500
- Chairman: Carlos Serol
- Head Coach: Ivo Soares
- League: Campeonato de Portugal
- 2019–20: Campeonato de Portugal; Serie D: 12th
Home colours	Away colours

Clube de Futebol Os Armacenenses (abbreviated as CF Armacenenses) is a Portuguese professional football club based in Armação de Pêra, Silves in the Algarve.

== Background ==
CF Armacenenses currently plays in the Campeonato de Portugal which is the third tier of Portuguese football. The club was founded in 1935 and they play their home matches at the Campo Das Gaivotas in Armação de Pêra, Silves.

The club is affiliated to Associação de Futebol do Algarve and has competed in the AF Algarve Taça. The club has also entered the national cup known as Taça de Portugal and has completed 4 games in the competition.

== International players ==
- (Cape Verde) Yuran Fernandes
- (Guinea-Bissau) Rui Dabó
- (São Tomé and Príncipe) Auleocárcio

== Season to season ==
Season	Tier	Division	Section	Place	Movements
1990–91	5	Distritais	AF Algarve – 1ª Divisão		Relegated
1991–92	6	Distritais	AF Algarve – 2ª Barlavento		
1992–93	6	Distritais	AF Algarve – 2ª Barlavento		
1993–94	6	Distritais	AF Algarve – 2ª Barlavento		
1994–95	6	Distritais	AF Algarve – 2ª Barlavento		Promoted
1995–96	5	Distritais	AF Algarve – 1ª Divisão		
1996–97	5	Distritais	AF Algarve – 1ª Divisão		
1997–98	5	Distritais	AF Algarve – 1ª Divisão		
1998–99	5	Distritais	AF Algarve – 1ª Divisão	13th	
1999–00	5	Distritais	AF Algarve – 1ª Divisão	6th	
2000–01	5	Distritais	AF Algarve – 1ª Divisão	9th	
2001–02	5	Distritais	AF Algarve – 1ª Divisão	4th	
2002–03	5	Distritais	AF Algarve – 1ª Divisão	9th	
2003–04	5	Distritais	AF Algarve – 1ª Divisão	12th	
2004–05	5	Distritais	AF Algarve – 1ª Divisão	10th	
2005–06	5	Distritais	AF Algarve – 1ª Divisão	8th	
2006–07	5	Distritais	AF Algarve – 1ª Divisão	7th	
2007–08	5	Distritais	AF Algarve – 1ª Divisão	4th	
2008–09	5	Distritais	AF Algarve – 1ª Divisão	8th	
2009–10	5	Distritais	AF Algarve – 1ª Divisão	10th	
2010–11	5	Distritais	AF Algarve – 1ª Divisão	8th	
2011–12	5	Distritais	AF Algarve – 1ª Divisão	3rd	
2015–16	4				Promoted
2016–17	3	Campeonato de Portugal	Serie H	8th	
2017–18	3	Campeonato de Portugal	Serie E	7th	
2018–19	3	Campeonato de Portugal	Serie D	8th	
2019–20	3	Campeonato de Portugal	Serie D	12th	
2020–21	3	Campeonato de Portugal	Serie		
