= 1999 Taça de Portugal final =

- Event: 1998–99 Taça de Portugal
Beira-Mar	Campomaiorense
1	0
- Date: 19 June 1999
- Venue: Estádio Nacional, Oeiras
- Man of the Match: Fusco (Beira-Mar)
- Referee: Lucílio Batista (Setúbal)
- Attendance: 25,000

The 1999 Taça de Portugal final was the final match of the 1998–99 Taça de Portugal, the 59th season of the Taça de Portugal, the premier Portuguese football cup competition organized by the Portuguese Football Federation (FPF). The match was played on 19 June 1999 at the Estádio Nacional in Oeiras, and opposed two Primeira Liga sides Beira-Mar and Campomaiorense. Beira-Mar defeated Campomaiorense 1–0 to claim the Taça de Portugal for the first time in their history. In Portugal, the final was televised live on RTP África, RTP Internacional, Sport TV and TVI.

As a result of Beira-Mar winning the Taça de Portugal, the Auri-negros qualified for the 1st round of 1999-2000 UEFA Cup and for the 1999 Supertaça Cândido de Oliveira where they took on 1998–99 Primeira Divisão winners Porto.

== Match ==
=== Details ===
19 June 1999
17:00 WEST

Beira-Mar	1–0	Campomaiorense
Ricardo Sousa 70'

Estádio Nacional, Oeiras
Attendance: 25,000
Referee: Lucílio Batista (Setúbal)

Beira-Mar	Campomaiorense

GK	1	(France) Jérôme Palatsi
RB	2	(Portugal) Jorge Neves	(yellow card) 45' (yellow-red card) 79'
CB	4	(Brazil) Lobão
CB	3	(Portugal) Gila
LB	18	(Portugal) António Caetano	(yellow card) 31' (yellow-red card) 60'
CM	15	(Portugal) Fusco (c)	(yellow card) 60'
CM	20	(Portugal) Eusébio	(yellow card) 90+4'
RM	16	(Portugal) Paulo Sérgio	(yellow card) 82'	(substituted off) 82'
AM	28	(Portugal) Ricardo Sousa		(substituted off) 77'
LM	17	(Portugal) Fernando Pereira	(yellow card) 14'
CF	9	(Senegal) Fary Faye		(substituted off) 65'
Substitutes:
GK	24	(Portugal) Elísio
DF	5	(Brazil) Cristiano Roland
MF	8	(Federal Republic of Yugoslavia) Saša Simić		(substituted on) 65'
MF	10	(Portugal) Carlos André	(yellow card) 90+6'	(substituted on) 77'
FW	21	(Portugal) Quintas		(substituted on) 82'
Manager:
(Portugal) António Sousa

GK	24	(Federal Republic of Yugoslavia) Dragoslav Poleksić
RB	14	(Portugal) Quim Machado (c)
CB	21	(Portugal) Marco Almeida	(yellow card) 14'
CB	8	(Brazil) René Rivas	(yellow card) 90+2' (yellow-red card) 90+4'
LB	7	(Portugal) Basílio Marques		(substituted off) 61'
DM	22	(Brazil) Mauro Soares	(yellow card) 65'
CM	5	(Portugal) Nuno Campos
CM	10	(Brazil) Isaías		(substituted off) 55'
CM	20	(Portugal) Rogério Matias	(yellow card) 67'
CF	9	(Brazil) Demétrius	(yellow card) 88'
CF	11	(Brazil) Laelson Lima
Substitutes:
GK	1	(Portugal) Paulo Sérgio
DF	3	(Portugal) Luís Miguel
MF	6	(Portugal) Vítor Manuel		(substituted on) 61'
MF	18	(Angola) Fernando Sousa
FW	17	(Brazil) Welington		(substituted on) 55'
Manager:
(Portugal) José Pereira

1998–99 Taça de Portugal Winners
Beira-Mar
1st Title

Man of the match

- (Portugal) Fusco (Beira-Mar)

Match officials

- Assistant referees:
  - Luís Salgado (Setúbal)
  - João Esteves (Setúbal)
- Fourth official:

Match rules

- 90 minutes.
- Five named substitutes
- Maximum of three substitutions
