= 1998–99 in Portuguese football =

The 1998/99 season of the Portuguese First Division began on August 21 and ended on May 30. FC Porto became champions for the fifth time in a row.

== Promoted teams ==
These teams were promoted from the Portuguese Second Division of Honour at the start of the season:

- UD Leiria (2nd Division of Honour champions)
- SC Beira-Mar (2nd placed)
- FC Alverca (3rd placed)

== Relegated teams ==
These teams were relegated to the Portuguese Second Division of Honour at the end of the season:

- SC Beira-Mar (16th placed)
- GD Chaves (17th placed)
- A. Académica de Coimbra (18th placed)

== Primeira Divisão ==
Pos	Team	Pld	W	D	L	GF	GA	GD	Pts	Qualification or relegation
1	Porto (C)	34	24	7	3	85	26	+59	79	Qualification to Champions League group stage
2	Boavista	34	20	11	3	57	29	+28	71	Qualification to Champions League third qualifying round
3	Benfica	34	19	8	7	71	29	+42	65	Qualification to UEFA Cup first round
4	Sporting CP	34	17	12	5	64	32	+32	63	Qualification to UEFA Cup first round
5	Vitória de Setúbal	34	15	8	11	37	38	−1	53	Qualification to UEFA Cup first round
6	União de Leiria	34	14	10	10	36	29	+7	52	
7	Vitória de Guimarães	34	14	8	12	53	41	+12	50	
8	Estrela da Amadora	34	11	12	11	33	40	−7	45	
9	Braga	34	10	12	12	38	50	−12	42	
10	Marítimo	34	10	11	13	44	45	−1	41	
11	Farense	34	10	9	15	39	54	−15	39	
12	Salgueiros	34	7	17	10	45	55	−10	38	
13	Campomaiorense	34	10	7	17	41	51	−10	37	
14	Alverca	34	8	11	15	36	50	−14	35	
15	Rio Ave	34	8	11	15	26	47	−21	35	
16	Beira-Mar (R)	34	6	15	13	36	53	−17	33	UEFA Cup first round and relegation to Segunda Liga (Note: Beira-Mar qualified for the UEFA Cup as Portuguese Cup winners)
17	Chaves (R)	34	5	10	19	39	70	−31	25	Relegation to Segunda Liga
18	Académica (R)	34	4	9	21	30	70	−40	21	Relegation to Segunda Liga

Source: Primeira Divisão
Rules for classification: 1st points, 2nd head-to-head, 3rd goals average
(C) Champions; (R) Relegated

== Cup ==
The final of the Cup was surprisingly between two minnows, SC Beira-Mar – who had just been relegated – beating SC Campomaiorense 1–0, after the precocious elimination of all stronger clubs, with FC Porto and S.L. Benfica being eliminated in the round of 32 and Sporting CP in the round of 64.

== See also ==
- 1998–99 Primeira Liga
