= Vitinha =

Portuguese footballer (born 2000)

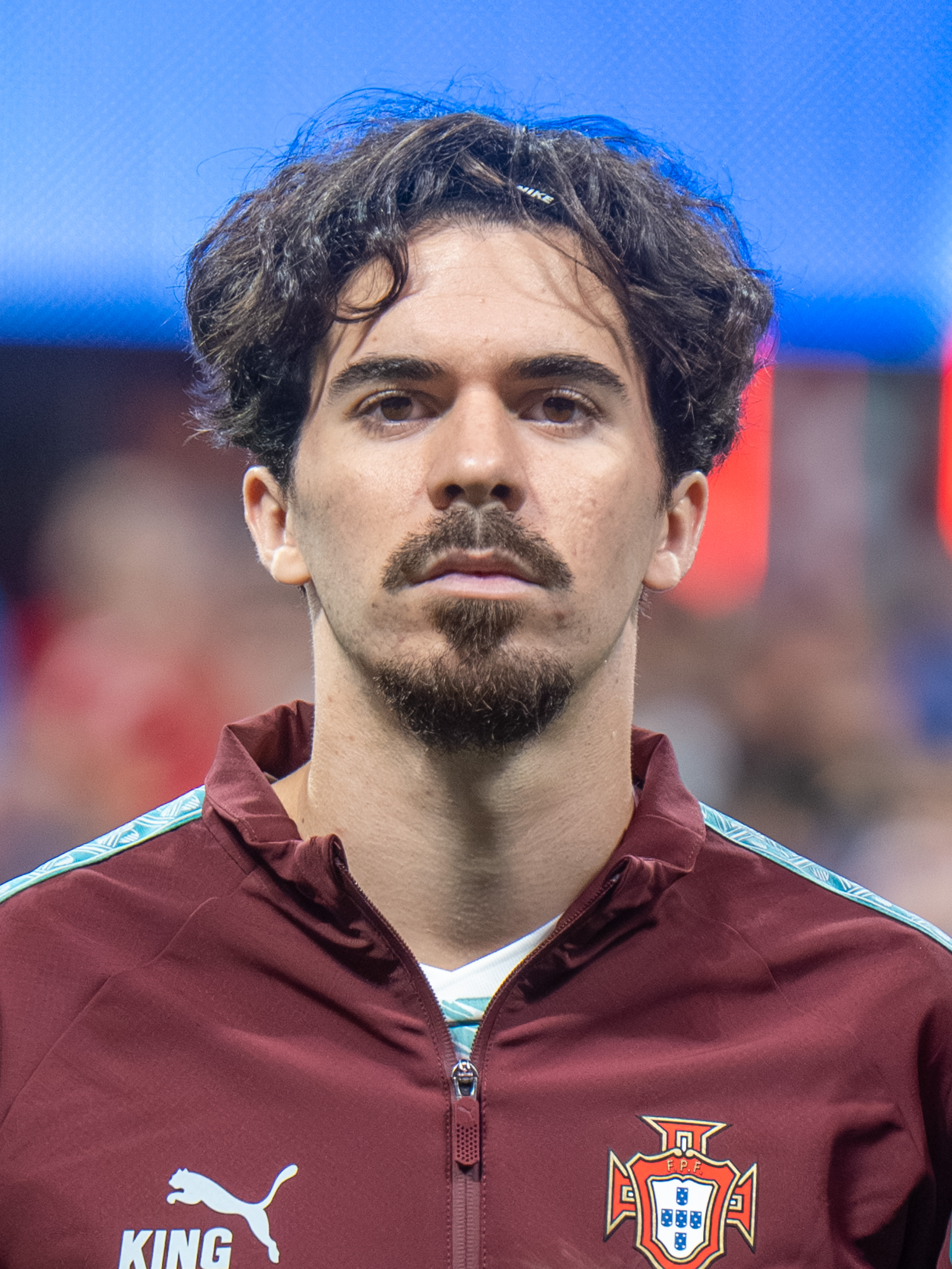
- Vitinha with Portugal in 2026

Personal information
- Full name: Vítor Machado Ferreira
- Date of birth: 13 February 2000 (age 26)
- Place of birth: Vila das Aves, Portugal
- Height: 1.72 m (5 ft 8 in)
- Position: Central midfielder

Team information
- Current team: Paris Saint-Germain
- Number: 17

Youth career
- 2006–2007: Aves
- 2008–2011: Póvoa Lanhoso
- 2011–2019: Porto
- 2015–2016: → Padroense (loan)

Senior career*
Years	Team	Apps	(Gls)
2019–2020	Porto B	14	(8)
2019–2022	Porto	38	(2)
2020–2021	→ Wolverhampton Wanderers (loan)	19	(0)
2022–	Paris Saint-Germain	131	(16)

International career^{‡}
2017	Portugal U17	1	(0)
2018	Portugal U18	7	(0)
2018–2019	Portugal U19	18	(3)
2019–2021	Portugal U21	22	(1)
2022–	Portugal	49	(1)
Medal record
Men's football
Representing Portugal
UEFA Nations League
Winner	2025 Germany
UEFA European U21 Championship
Runner-up	2021 Hungary–Slovenia
UEFA European U19 Championship
Runner-up	2019 Armenia
- * Club domestic league appearances and goals as of 21:24, 7 November 2026 (UTC) ‡ National team caps and goals as of 23:02, 17 November 2026 (UTC)

Vítor Machado Ferreira (born 13 February 2000), known as Vitinha (Portuguese pronunciation: [viˈtiɲɐ]), is a Portuguese professional footballer who plays as a defensive midfielder for Ligue 1 club Paris Saint-Germain and the Portugal national team. Considered one of the best midfielders in the world, he is known for his ball control, work rate, and playmaking abilities.

Coming through Porto's youth system, Vitinha was promoted to the first-team in 2020. He was loaned to Premier League club Wolverhampton Wanderers in September 2020, before returning the following season. He established himself as an integral player for Porto winning a domestic double, being named the league's Best Young Player of the Year. In June 2022, he joined Paris Saint-Germain. With PSG, he won four Ligue 1 titles, two Coupes de France, and was integral to the club winning their first UEFA Champions League titles back-to-back in 2025 and 2026, with the former being part of a continental treble. In 2025, Vitinha finished third in the voting for the Ballon d'Or award. He was also included in the FIFPRO World 11 in 2025 and 2026.

Vitinha is a former Portugal youth international, representing his country at various youth levels, being part of the under-19 and under-21 teams that finished as runners-up in the 2019 UEFA European Under-19 Championship and 2021 European Under-21 Championship, respectively. He made his senior international debut in 2022, representing Portugal at the 2022 FIFA World Cup, UEFA Euro 2024, and the 2026 World Cup. He also won the UEFA Nations League in 2025.

== Club career ==
=== Porto ===
==== 2019–20: Early career ====
Vitinha was born in Santo Tirso, Porto District. He started playing football at Aves, where his father formerly played for the club, before moving to Pinheirinhos de Ringe, where he played alongside goalkeeper and future international teammate Diogo Costa. After going through some training sessions with Benfica, he was integrated into one of Benfica's feeder club Póvoa de Lanhoso, where he stayed for three years. Despite Sporting CP being interested in him, Vitinha ended up joining the youth ranks of Porto two years later, aged eleven, being subsequently loaned to Padroense for a season.

He made his LigaPro debut for the reserve team on 11 August 2019 in a game against Covilhã. He was also part of Porto's squad that won the 2018–19 UEFA Youth League. On 28 January 2020, Vitinha made his first appearance for the first team, coming on as a substitute for Wilson Manafá in the 61st minute in a match against Gil Vicente. He made a total of eight appearances as the club won the league title.

==== 2020–21: Loan to Wolves ====
On 9 September 2020, Vitinha moved on a season-long loan to English Premier League club Wolverhampton Wanderers. The club held an option to make the loan into permanent deal at its conclusion for a fee of €20 million, as Porto were forced to loan him due to UEFA's Financial Fair Play regulations. He made his debut on 14 September away to Sheffield United as a second-half substitute, and his first start three days later in a home EFL Cup defeat to Stoke City.

Vitinha made his full Premier League debut away to Manchester United on 29 December 2020, a game which Wolves lost narrowly to a deflection in added time. On 22 January, he scored his first goal for the club with a 35-yard strike in a 1–0 away win over non-League team Chorley in the fourth round of the FA Cup. At the end of the season, the club declined to exercise his buy option.

==== 2021–22: Return and domestic double ====
Vitinha began the 2021–22 season on the bench, but following his impressive performances during the 2021 UEFA European Under-21 Championship, he began finding more and more space as a starter, scoring his first goal for the club in a 3–0 away win against Portimonense on 3 December. On 23 December, Vitinha impressed during the 3–0 home over rivals Benfica in O Clássico in the Taça de Portugal, scoring and assisting a goal, as he was named man of match.

Shortly after Sérgio Oliveira departed to Roma in January 2022, Vitinha further consolidated his place as starter, impressing Porto's manager Sérgio Conceição, with his performances without the ball and his pressing, being named the league's Player of the Month and Midfielder of the Month for two consecutive months in December and January, a feat which he repeated in March.

Vitinha would contribute to 47 appearances, with a goal in the 3–1 defeat of Tondela in the domestic cup final, to help Porto win the domestic double of the Primeira Liga and the Taça de Portugal, while also being named in the Primeira Liga Team of the Year and the Primeira Liga Best Young Player of the Year.

=== Paris Saint-Germain ===
==== 2022–23: Adaptation to France ====
On 30 June 2022, Vitinha signed a five-year contract with Ligue 1 side Paris Saint-Germain (PSG), for a fee of €41.5 million, after triggering the release clause of his contract.

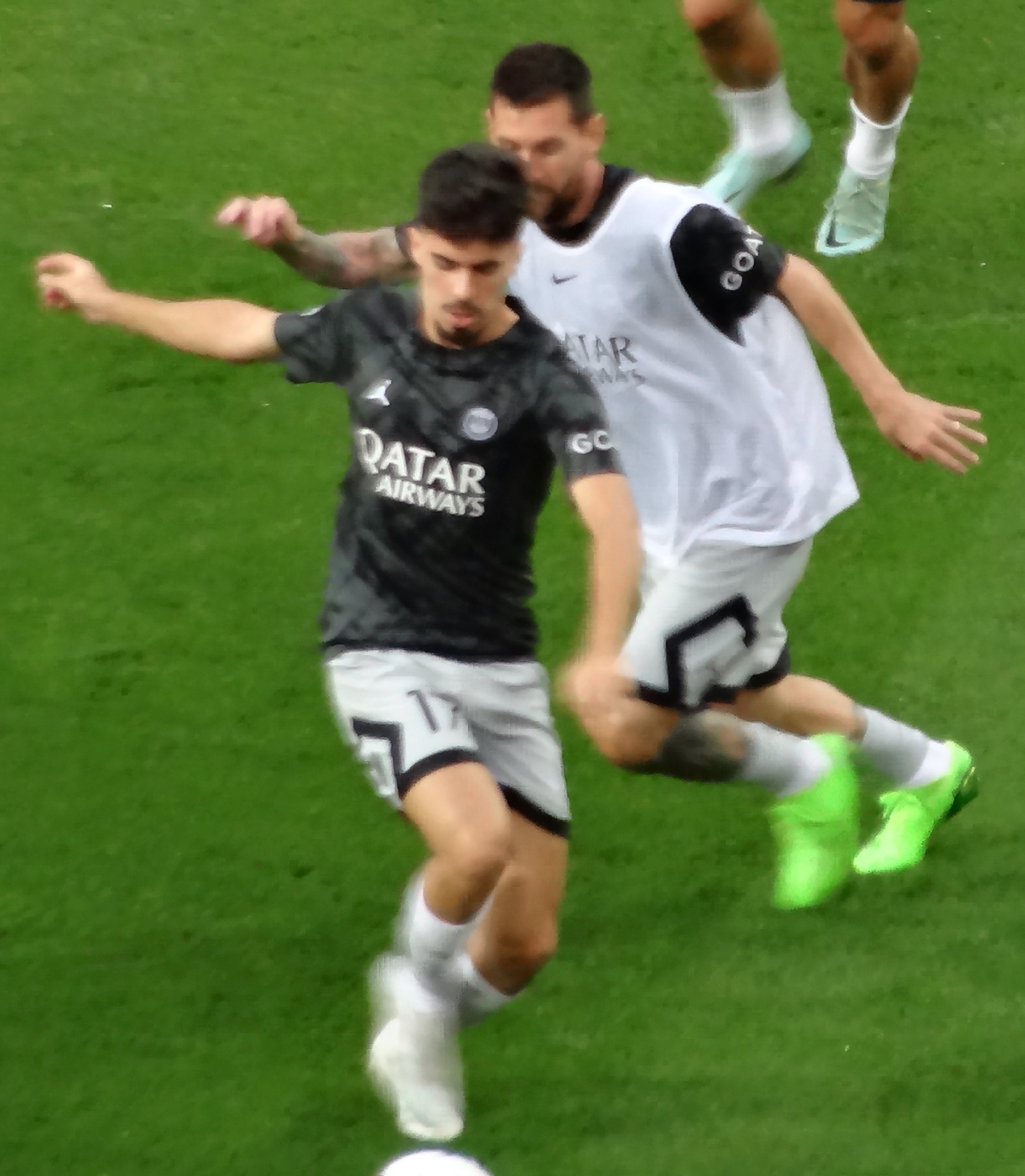
Vitinha warming up for Paris Saint-Germain in August 2022

Vitinha made his debut for the club on 31 July, starting in PSG's 4–0 victory over Nantes in the Trophée des Champions, registering a 100% passing rate, completing 43 out of his 43 passes, while also being booked in the match and winning his first trophy with the club. Brought in as a signing for the future, Vitinha was seen as a player that could grow and develop during his tenure with the club and quickly his performances throughout the start of the season were highly lauded, receiving various praises for the central midfield combination of him and Marco Verratti and his quick adaption into his new team, despite fierce competition from more experienced players like Carlos Soler, Renato Sanches and Fabián Ruiz.

However, the following months, proved to be difficult for him, due to having a complicated relationship with fellow team-mate Lionel Messi and those close to him in the team, after a reported training ground bust-up between them. He was reportedly the target of Neymar's outburst after a 3–1 loss to Monaco on 11 February 2023, who complained that the squad had been significantly weakened with the arrival of players such as Vitinha. Those incidents took a toll on him and his performances declined on the second half of the season, to the point where he lost his starting spot.

He scored his first goal for PSG, a long-range strike in a 3–1 home victory over Lens on 15 April. During the season, he was a key contributor to his team's record eleventh Ligue 1 title, despite his irregular form.

==== 2023–24: Domestic treble and breakthrough ====
The following season, despite the ire and consternations of the senior players, PSG kept their belief in Vitinha and after the departures of Messi and Neymar, his performances improved, gaining fully the trust of new manager Luis Enrique, with his attacking style being put to good use in his system. He also became a popular figure in the dressing room, with his grasp of multiple languages, making him a positive influence that helped unite various factions within the club. He was named man of the match in PSG's 2–0 win over Borussia Dortmund on matchday one of the group stage of the 2023–24 UEFA Champions League on 19 September. On 20 December, he scored his fifth league goal of the season, PSG's first in a 3–1 home victory over Metz, while also maintaining a 90% pass completion rate despite being assigned to a deeper midfield role.

On 10 April 2024, Vitinha scored his first Champions League goal in a 3–2 home defeat to Barcelona in the quarter-finals. He scored another goal against Barcelona in the second leg six days later, helping PSG to a 4–1 victory and qualification to the semi-finals. In the semi-finals, PSG was knocked out by Borussia Dortmund, after losing 2–0 on aggregate. Despite the defeat, Vitinha received praise for his performances over both legs, with critics arguing that he was "let down by his teammates".

After helping PSG win a domestic treble with record-extending successes in Ligue 1, the Coupe de France, and the Trophée des Champions, he achieved his most prolific season, finishing the campaign with 14 goal involvements (9 goals and five assists), leading Enrique to credit Vitinha as the club's player of the season. His performances throughout the season also saw him being included in Ligue 1's Team of the Year and the Champions League team of the tournament.

==== 2024–25: Continental treble and individual achievements ====
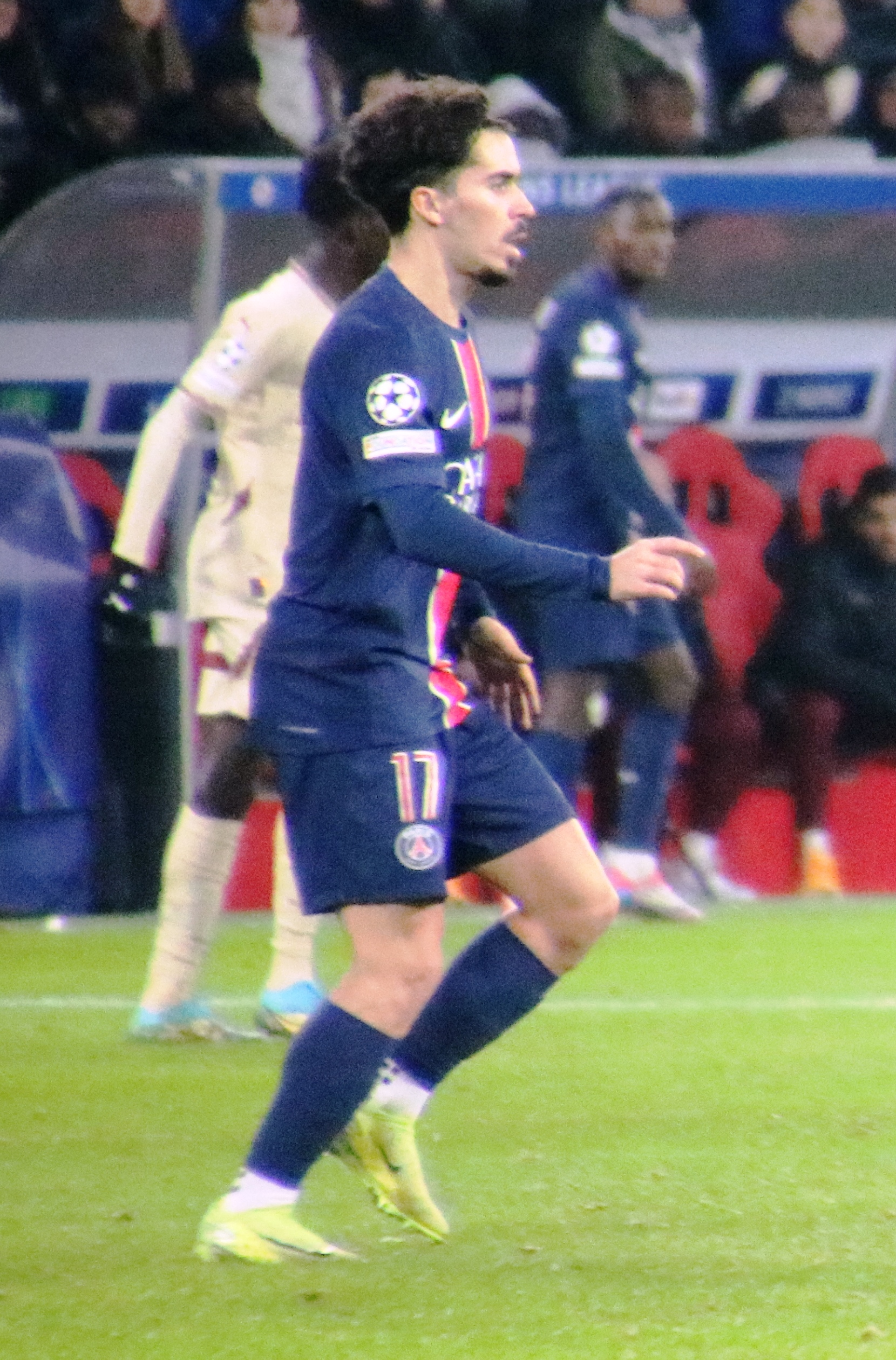
Vitinha playing for Paris Saint-Germain during the 2024–25 season

On 22 August, Vitinha was elected by manager Luis Enrique as one of the club's vice-captains, due to his status within the team. He also chose him as the club's main penalty-taker, despite some of his teammates not being pleased with the decision, leading him to rotate with Ousmane Dembélé on penalty duties. On 1 September, Vitinha opened the scoring from the penalty spot, netting his first goal of the season in a 3–1 away win over Lille.

On 9 February 2025, he extended his contract with the club until 2029. Ten days later, in the second leg of the Champions League knockout phase play-offs, Vitinha got on the scoresheet in a 7–0 win over fellow Ligue 1 side Brest, scoring PSG's third goal, and helping his side secure a 10–0 aggregate victory to advance to the Champions League round of 16. On 29 April, he was named man of the match in PSG's 1–0 away win over Arsenal in the Champions League semi-finals first leg. In the second leg, despite missing a penalty, PSG advanced to their second Champions League final, following a 2–1 home victory. Having helped PSG secure their 13th Ligue 1 title, he was one of the nominees for the Ligue 1 Player of the Year, and was included in the Ligue 1 Team of the Season.

On 31 May, he created PSG's first goal and provided an assist to Desire Doué's second goal in the Champions League final against Inter Milan, which PSG won 5–0, securing their first ever Champions League trophy and completing a continental treble. Additionally, his performances throughout the season also saw him being included in the Champions League team of the tournament. On 15 June, Vitinha scored the PSG's first goal in the FIFA Club World Cup, netting the opener in a 4–0 win against Atlético Madrid in the 2025 FIFA Club World Cup. He would help his team reach the final, where they were defeated 3–0 by Chelsea. He finished the tournament with one goal and two assists, earning the Silver Ball as the tournament's second best player.

==== 2025–26: Back-to-back Champions League titles and Ballon d'Or third place ====
On 7 August, Vitinha was one of nine PSG players included in the final 30-man shortlist for the 2025 Ballon d'Or. On 22 September, he finished third in the Ballon d'Or, behind winner and teammate Ousmane Dembélé and Lamine Yamal. On 5 October, he made his 100th Ligue 1 appearance for PSG in 1–1 draw against Lille. In the Champions League league phase, on 26 November, Vitinha scored his first career hat-trick in a 5–3 home win against Tottenham Hotspur. On 17 December, he helped PSG defeat Flamengo 2–1 on penalties, successfully converting his spot kick, in the FIFA Intercontinental Cup final after a 1–1 draw in regular time, securing his club's first title in the competition. With his performance, Vitinha received the Player of the Tournament and Golden Ball awards.

On 8 January 2026, Vitinha assisted the first goal and created the assist for the second in a 2–2 draw against Marseille, as part of Le Classique in the 2025 Trophée des Champions, an eventual victory on penalties for PSG. Over the following months, he was heavily speculated of a possible transfer to Real Madrid in the summer. However, on 6 March, in an interview with Canal 11, Vitinha ruled out any potential transfer move, reaffirming his intention to continue at PSG, based on the success achieved in the previous season at the club and his positive relationship with his teammates and manager Luis Enrique.

On 19 April, in a match against Lyon, he suffered an inflammation of his right heel, forcing him to miss PSG's next league matches against Nantes and Angers and with his availability for the Champions League semifinal first leg against Bayern Munich on 28 April also being in doubt. However, he managed to return in time for the tie, helping his team advance to their second consecutive Champions League final, following a 6–5 aggregate win against them on 6 May. On 13 May, PSG won 2–0 away against Lens, to secure their 12th league title in 14 years. Later that month, on 30 May, he was named Player of the Match in the Champions League final against Arsenal, which Paris Saint-Germain won 4–3 on penalties after a 1–1 draw following extra time, retaining their title.

== International career ==
=== Youth ===
Having played at various youth levels for Portugal, Vitinha was named captain for the under-19 squad at the 2019 UEFA European Under-19 Championship in Armenia, playing all five matches, scoring twice and assisting once as the team finished runners-up to Spain.

Vitinha was named in the under-21 squad for the 2021 UEFA European Under-21 Championship. He was named for the team of the tournament as Portugal finished as runners-up after losing in the final 1–0 to Germany, on 6 June 2021.

=== Senior ===
On 21 March 2022, Vitinha received his first call-up to the senior squad for the 2022 World Cup qualification play-offs, as a replacement for the injured Rúben Neves. Eight days later at his club ground, he made his senior national team debut, replacing João Moutinho in added time in a 2–0 victory over North Macedonia in the play-off final.

In October, he was named in Portugal's preliminary 55-man squad for the 2022 FIFA World Cup in Qatar, being included in the final 26-man squad for the tournament. He only started in the 2–1 loss to South Korea in Portugal's final group stage match, and appeared off the bench in two knockout-phase matches, in an eventual quarter-final exit.

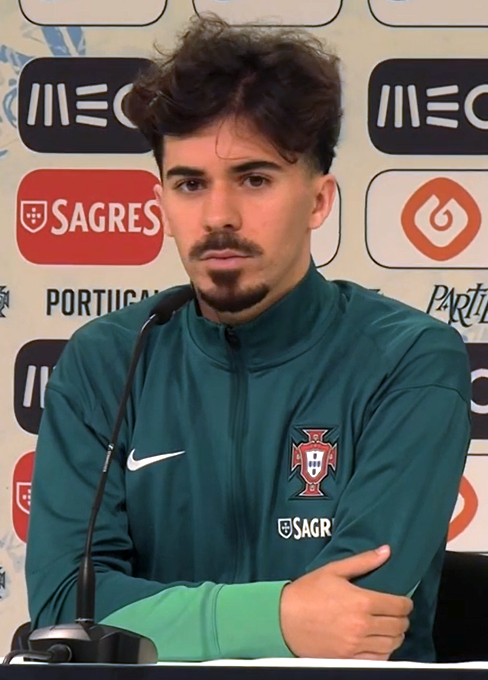
Vitinha with Portugal in 2024 Euros

On 21 May 2024, he was selected in the 26-man squad for the UEFA Euro 2024. In the opening match against the Czech Republic, on 18 June, after being one goal down, Vitinha created Robin Hranáč's own goal, following a cross to Nuno Mendes at the back post, in a 2–1 comeback victory for Portugal, being awarded player of the match. His performances earned him a spot in the starting eleven, despite fierce competition from teammates Bernardo Silva and Bruno Fernandes, leading him to start in Portugal's 3–0 win against Turkey on 22 June, helping his country secure qualification to the knockout phase. He made his third appearance of the tournament in Portugal's round of 16 match against Slovenia and played 65 minutes before being substituted for Diogo Jota as Portugal won 3–0 in a penalty shootout. Portugal were eliminated in the quarter-finals to France after losing 5–3 in another penalty shootout.

Vitinha playing for Portugal at the 2026 FIFA World Cup

In May 2025, Vitinha was selected for Portugal’s 2025 UEFA Nations League Finals squad. He and his team would go on to win the tournament 5–3 in a penalty shootout over rivals Spain, converting Portugal's second penalty in the shoot-out.

On 19 May 2026, Vitinha was selected in the 26-man squad for the 2026 FIFA World Cup. On June 17, in Portugal's group opener against Democratic Republic of Congo, Vitinha completed 121 passes, the most ever by a Portugal player in the World Cup.

== Style of play ==
"I played with similar players, of course, with all due respect, Iniesta and Xavi, [...] they are players who control the tempo and pace of the game whether in possession or out of possession. It is the player who will make small fouls when necessary. If he is high up (on the pitch), he is the player who will make the pass when necessary."

— Thierry Henry on Vitinha's playing style

Vitinha is best described as a deep-lying tempo-setting defensive midfielder who thrives at the base of possession phases. He often drops close to his centre-backs to receive the ball early in the build-up, sometimes even taking it directly off their feet before turning and progressing play. From these deeper zones, his priority is not just safe circulation but forward momentum — he looks to move the ball into more advanced areas with purpose, whether through short combinations or longer progressive passes. While he mainly operates centrally, he has the tactical flexibility to drift wider or push slightly higher depending on the structure, and under coaches like Luis Enrique, he has even been used in more advanced or wide midfield roles.

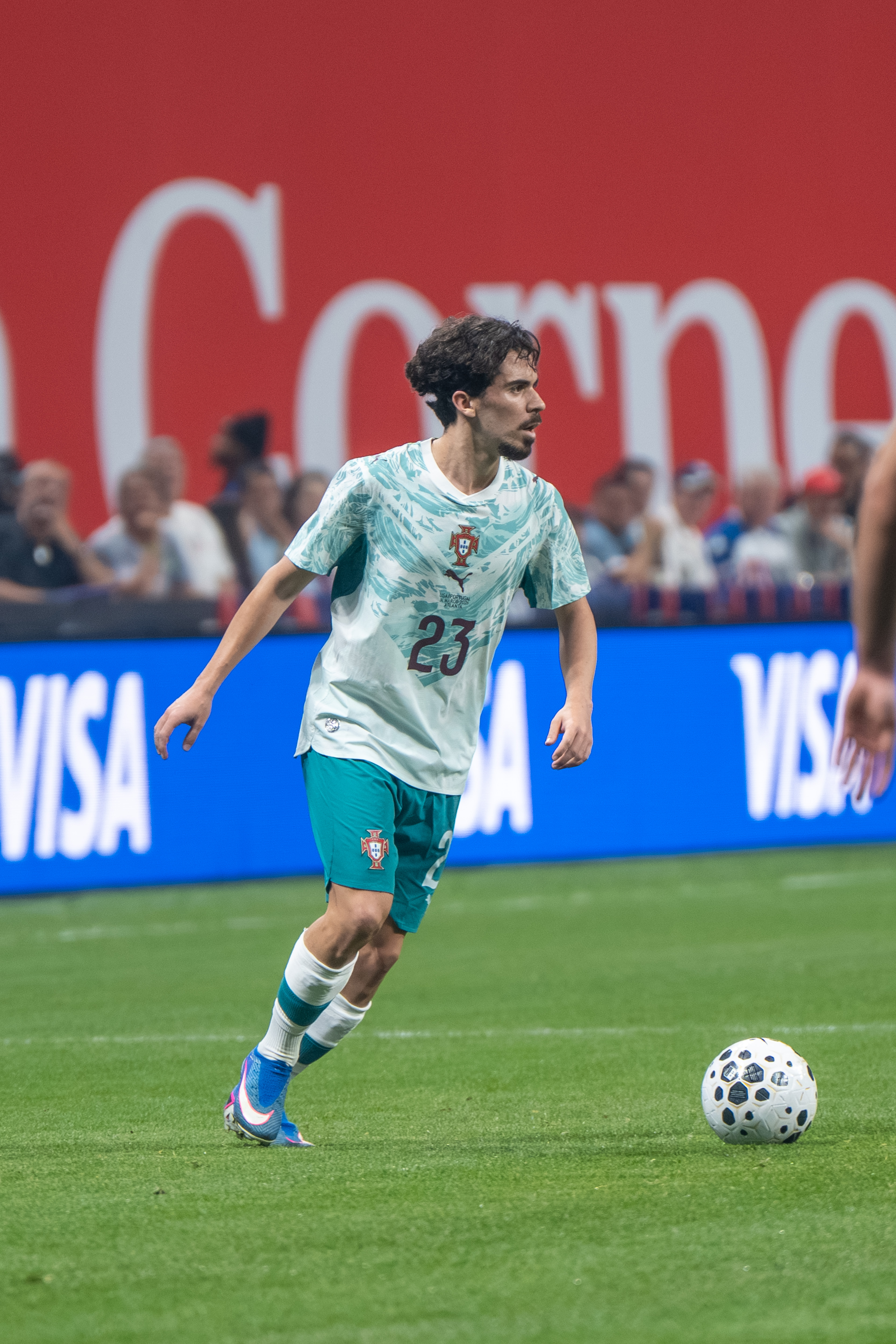
Vitinha playing for Portugal in 2026.

Vitinha stands out for his close control, balance, and composure under pressure. He is extremely press-resistant; opposition players often struggle to dispossess him because of how quickly he adjusts his body, releases the ball, or slips through tight spaces. His passing range is clean and efficient rather than flashy, but it is consistently progressive—he excels at moving the ball into dangerous areas and sustaining attacking sequences. He is also effective in transition moments, where his quick control and awareness allow him to either escape pressure or immediately turn defense into attack with a well-weighted pass. Defensively, he contributes through intelligence and anticipation rather than physical dominance. He is active in counter-pressing situations, often reacting quickly after losing possession to recover the ball or disrupt the opponent’s transition. His positioning helps block passing lanes and slow down attacks, making him a reliable presence in front of the defense. While not a classic ball-winning destroyer, he combines solid tackling with smart reading of the game, which allows him to contribute consistently without overcommitting.

== Personal life ==
Vitinha's father is Vítor Manuel, a former professional footballer who played as a midfielder for several clubs including his hometown's Aves for several years, and was a Taça de Portugal finalist with Campomaiorense in 1999.

Vitinha and his partner Tatiana Torres have two daughters as of 2025.

He is a distant cousin of the barons of Itamaracá, Tomás Antônio Maciel Monteiro and Antônio Peregrino Maciel Monteiro, on the maternal side, according to a genealogical study published by Observador.

== Career statistics ==
=== Club ===
As of match played 7 November 2026

Appearances and goals by club, season and competition
Club	Season	League			National cup (Note: Includes Taça de Portugal, FA Cup, Coupe de France)		League cup (Note: Includes Taça da Liga, EFL Cup)		Europe		Other		Total	
Club	Season	Division	Apps	Goals	Apps	Goals	Apps	Goals	Apps	Goals	Apps	Goals	Apps	Goals
Porto B	2019–20	LigaPro	14	8	—		—		—		—		14	8
Porto	2019–20	Primeira Liga	8	0	3	0	1	0	0	0	—		12	0
Porto	2021–22	Primeira Liga	30	2	7	2	0	0	10 (Note: Six appearances in UEFA Champions League, four appearances in UEFA Europa League)	0	—		47	4
Porto	Total		38	2	10	2	1	0	10	0	—		59	4
Wolverhampton Wanderers (loan)	2020–21	Premier League	19	0	2	1	1	0	—		—		22	1
Paris Saint-Germain	2022–23	Ligue 1	36	2	3	0	—		8 (Note: Appearances in UEFA Champions League)	0	1 (Note: Appearance in Trophée des Champions)	0	48	2
Paris Saint-Germain	2023–24	Ligue 1	28	7	5	0	—		12	2	1	0	46	9
Paris Saint-Germain	2024–25	Ligue 1	29	5	5	0	—		17	2	8 (Note: One appearance in Trophée des Champions, seven appearances and one goal in FIFA Club World Cup)	1	59	8
Paris Saint-Germain	2025–26	Ligue 1	29	1	1	0	—		17	6	3 (Note: One appearance in UEFA Super Cup, one appearance in FIFA Intercontinental Cup, one appearance in Trophée des Champions)	0	50	7
Paris Saint-Germain	2026–27	Ligue 1	9	1	0	0	—		4	2	2 (Note: One appearance in UEFA Super Cup, one appearance in Trophée des Champions)	0	15	3
Paris Saint-Germain	Total		131	16	14	0	—		58	12	15	1	218	29
Career total			202	26	26	3	2	0	68	12	15	1	313	42

=== International ===
As of match played 17 November 2026

Appearances and goals by national team and year
National team	Year	Apps	Goals
Portugal	2022	8	0
Portugal	2023	6	0
Portugal	2024	11	0
Portugal	2025	10	0
Portugal	2026	14	1
Total		49	1

As of match played 1 October 2026
Portugal score listed first, score column indicates score after each Vitinha goal.

List of international goals scored by Vitinha
No.	Date	Venue	Cap	Opponent	Score	Result	Competition
1	1 October 2026	Parken Stadium, Copenhagen, Denmark	46	Denmark	3–2	4–2	2026–27 UEFA Nations League A

== Honours ==
Porto Youth

- UEFA Youth League: 2018–19

Porto

- Primeira Liga: 2019–20, 2021–22
- Taça de Portugal: 2019–20, 2021–22

Paris Saint-Germain

- Ligue 1: 2022–23, 2023–24, 2024–25, 2025–26
- Coupe de France: 2023–24, 2024–25
- Trophée des Champions: 2022, 2023, 2024, 2025
- UEFA Champions League: 2024–25, 2025–26
- UEFA Super Cup: 2025, 2026
- FIFA Intercontinental Cup: 2025
- FIFA Club World Cup runner-up: 2025

Portugal U19

- UEFA European Under-19 Championship runner-up: 2019

Portugal U21

- UEFA European Under-21 Championship runner-up: 2021

Portugal

- UEFA Nations League: 2024–25

Individual

- Ballon d'Or third place: 2025
- Primeira Liga Young Player of the Year: 2021–22
- Primeira Liga Player of the Month: December 2021, January 2022, March 2022
- Primeira Liga Team of the Year: 2021–22
- UNFP Ligue 1 Team of the Year: 2023–24, 2024–25, 2025–26
- UEFA Champions League Team of the Season: 2023–24, 2024–25, 2025–26
- Toulon Tournament Breakthrough player: 2019
- Toulon Tournament Best XI: 2019
- UEFA European Under-21 Championship Team of the Tournament: 2021
- The Athletic Ligue 1 Team of the Season: 2023–24
- The Athletic European Men's Team of the Season: 2024–25
- FIFA Club World Cup Silver Ball: 2025
- FIFA Intercontinental Cup Player of the Tournament: 2025
- FIFPRO World 11: 2025, 2026
- FIFA Men's World 11: 2025
- IFFHS World's Best Playmaker: 2025
- IFFHS Men's World Team: 2025
- Globe Soccer Awards Midfielder of the Year: 2025
