= Vítor Ferreira (disambiguation) =

Vítor Ferreira is the birth name of Vitinha, a Portuguese footballer. Other notable people of the same name include:

- Vítor Manuel (born 1970), Portuguese footballer born Vítor Manuel Sousa Ferreira, father of Vitinha
- Vitó Ferreira (born 1997), Portuguese footballer born Vítor Emanuel Araújo Ferreira

== See also ==
- Víctor Ferreira (disambiguation)
