= Pedro Lavoura =

Venezuelan footballer (1974-2000)

Personal information
- Full name: Pedro Ricardo Bandarra Lavoura
- Date of birth: 29 June 1974
- Place of birth: Caracas, Venezuela
- Date of death: 13 August 2000 (aged 26)
- Place of death: Oliveira do Bairro, Portugal
- Height: 1.71 m (5 ft 7 in)
- Position: Midfielder

Youth career
- Aguim
- 1985–1993: Anadia

Senior career*
Years	Team	Apps	(Gls)
1993–1995	Anadia	15	(0)
1994	→ Aguinense (loan)		
1995–1999	Académica	82	(6)
1999–2000	Braga	31	(2)
Total		112	(8)
- * Club domestic league appearances and goals

Pedro Ricardo Bandarra Lavoura (29 June 1974 – 13 August 2000) was a Venezuelan footballer who played as a midfielder. He was killed in a car accident in 2000 - his second accident in three years.

== Career statistics ==
=== Club ===
Club	Season	League			Cup		Other		Total	
Club	Season	Division	Apps	Goals	Apps	Goals	Apps	Goals	Apps	Goals
Anadia	1992–93	Segunda Divisão B	15	0	0	0	0	0	15	0
Anadia	1993–94	Terceira Divisão	–		0	0	0	0	0	0
Anadia	1994–95	Terceira Divisão	–		1	0	0	0	1	0
Anadia	Total		15	0	1	0	0	0	16	0
Académica	1995–96	Segunda Divisão de Honra	13	3	2	1	0	0	15	4
Académica	1996–97	Segunda Divisão de Honra	15	2	3	0	0	0	18	2
Académica	1997–98	Primeira Divisão	20	1	0	0	0	0	20	1
Académica	1998–99	Primeira Divisão	24	0	0	0	0	0	24	0
Académica	Total		82	6	5	1	0	0	87	7
Braga	1999–00	Primeira Liga	31	2	1	0	0	0	32	2
Career total			112	8	7	1	0	0	119	9
