= Carlos André =

Carlos André may refer to:

- Carlos André (footballer, born 1971), Portuguese football player and coach
- Carlos André (footballer, born 1987), Brazilian football player
- Carlos André (footballer, born 1982), Portuguese football left winger
