= Vítor Manuel =

Portuguese footballer (born 1970)

Personal information
- Full name: Vítor Manuel Sousa Ferreira
- Date of birth: 9 September 1970 (age 56)
- Place of birth: Aves, Portugal
- Height: 1.73 m (5 ft 8 in)
- Position: Midfielder

Youth career
- 1983–1988: Aves

Senior career*
Years	Team	Apps	(Gls)
1988–1993	Aves	107	(19)
1993–1995	Belenenses	31	(3)
1995–1999	Campomaiorense	108	(12)
1999–2001	Farense	55	(0)
2001–2002	Varzim	15	(0)
2002–2007	Aves	124	(19)
Total		440	(53)
- * Club domestic league appearances and goals

Vítor Manuel Sousa Ferreira (born 9 September 1970), known as Vítor Manuel, is a Portuguese former footballer who played as a midfielder. He played 188 Primeira Liga games for Belenenses, Campomaiorense, Farense, Varzim and Aves, scoring 11 goals. With Campomaiorense, he won the second-tier title in 1997 and played in the Taça de Portugal final in 1999.

== Career ==
Born in Aves in Santo Tirso, Vítor Manuel was a youth player at local C.D. Aves, where he made his senior debut in 1988 in the Segunda Divisão. In 1993, he transferred to his first Primeira Liga club, C.F. Os Belenenses.

In 1995, Vítor Manuel was loaned to S.C. Campomaiorense. He played 25 games in his first season and scored once in a 3–1 loss away to Belenenses on 8 February as his team ended the campaign with relegation. The team achieved instant promotion back as champions in 1996–97 and over the next two top-flight seasons he scored six times in 49 games; he ranked fifth for first-division appearances for the club from the Alentejo. He helped them to the Taça de Portugal final in 1999, and came on as a 62nd-minute substitute for Basílio Marques in the 1–0 loss to S.C. Beira-Mar.

Campomaiorense's cup run led to interest in Vítor Manuel from UD Salamanca of Spain, but he instead joined S.C. Farense in 1999, where he stayed for two seasons. In July 2001, the 30-year-old joined Varzim S.C. due to his desire to return to his native northern Portugal for the first time in eight years, and first time with a top-flight club. After a year there, he returned to Aves for the remainder of his career, playing his last year of 2006–07 in a season that ended with relegation from the top league.

== Personal life ==
Vítor Manuel's son of the same first name, known as Vitinha, also became a professional footballer. He represented clubs including FC Porto, Paris Saint-Germain FC, and the Portugal national team.

== Honours ==
Campomaiorense

- Segunda Divisão da Honra: 1996–97
