= Fusco (footballer) =

Portuguese footballer

Personal information
- Full name: João Carlos Proença Filipe
- Date of birth: 15 December 1972 (age 53)
- Place of birth: Lisbon, Portugal
- Height: 1.71 m (5 ft 7 1/2 in)
- Position: Midfielder

Youth career
- 1984–1990: Seixal

Senior career*
Years	Team	Apps	(Gls)
1990–1994	Seixal		
1994–1995	Louletano	29	(0)
1995–2004	Beira-Mar	164	(7)
2004–2005	Pinhalnovense	11	(0)
2005–2007	Seixal		
2007–2009	Fabril	49	(0)
2009–2010	Paio Pires		
2013–2014	Paio Pires	3	(0)
- * Club domestic league appearances and goals

João Carlos Proença Filipe (born 15 December 1972), known as Fusco, is a Portuguese former professional footballer who played as a midfielder.

== Club career ==
Born in Lisbon, Fusco spent his entire professional career with S.C. Beira-Mar, amassing Primeira Liga totals of 54 games and one goal for the club over five seasons. He made his debut in the competition on 21 August 1998, starting and being sent off in a 2–1 away loss against S.C. Braga.

On 19 June 1999, Fusco played the full 90 minutes of the final of the Taça de Portugal, helping the Aveiro side to their first and only major title after the 1–0 defeat of S.C. Campomaiorense. He scored his only goal in the Portuguese top division on 25 February 2001, opening the 2–0 victory at the same adversary and later providing an assist.

== Honours ==
Beira-Mar

- Taça de Portugal: 1998–99
