= Víctor Ferreira =

Víctor Ferreira may refer to:

- Víctor Ferreira (footballer) (born 1986), Paraguayan footballer
- Victor Ferreira (basketball) (born 1986), Dutch former basketball player

== See also ==
- Victor Ferreyra (born 1964), Argentine former footballer
- Vítor Ferreira (disambiguation)
