= 1991–92 Segunda Divisão B =

Segunda Divisão
- Season: 1991–92
- Champions: SC Campomaiorense
- Promoted: SC Campomaiorense; FC Felgueiras; Amora FC
- Relegated: 12 teams

The 1991–92 Segunda Divisão season was the 58th season of the competition and the 45th season of recognised third-tier football in Portugal.

== Overview ==
The league was contested by 54 teams in 3 divisions with SC Campomaiorense, FC Felgueiras and Amora FC winning the respective divisional competitions and gaining promotion to the Liga de Honra. The overall championship was won by SC Campomaiorense.

== League standings ==
=== Segunda Divisão - Zona Norte ===
Pos	Team	Pld	W	D	L	GF	GA	GD	Pts	Promotion or relegation
1	FC Felgueiras	34	21	9	4	48	20	+28	51	Promotion to Liga de Honra
2	Varzim SC	34	18	9	7	43	22	+21	45	
3	FC Maia	34	17	11	6	47	27	+20	45	
4	Infesta FC	34	16	10	8	61	47	+14	42	
5	AD Fafe	34	15	7	12	42	35	+7	37	
6	FC Vizela	34	12	11	11	49	50	−1	35	
7	SC Vila Real	34	12	11	11	45	40	+5	35	
8	AD Lousada	34	12	10	12	49	45	+4	34	
9	Sport Club de Freamunde	34	8	17	9	42	37	+5	33	
10	FC Marco	34	13	7	14	44	41	+3	33	
11	Moreirense FC	34	10	12	12	36	40	−4	32	
12	AD Esposende	34	13	6	15	39	45	−6	32	
13	União Paredes	34	12	6	16	40	52	−12	30	
14	Ermesinde SC	34	13	4	17	37	51	−14	30	
15	GD Joane	34	9	11	14	40	54	−14	29	Relegation to Terceira Divisão
16	Neves FC	34	9	9	16	33	38	−5	27	Relegation to Terceira Divisão
17	Arsenal Braga	34	8	8	18	31	44	−13	24	Relegation to Terceira Divisão
18	Pedrouços AC	34	5	8	21	32	70	−38	18	Relegation to Terceira Divisão

=== Segunda Divisão - Zona Centro ===
Pos	Team	Pld	W	D	L	GF	GA	GD	Pts	Promotion or relegation
1	SC Campomaiorense	34	21	6	7	69	27	+42	48	Promotion to Liga de Honra
2	AD Sanjoanense	34	18	10	6	52	28	+24	46	
3	CD Lousanense	34	16	11	7	42	27	+15	43	
4	Oliveira do Hospital	34	17	8	9	47	28	+19	42	
5	Caldas SC	34	14	14	6	49	32	+17	42	
6	União Mirense	34	14	10	10	40	36	+4	38	
7	União Lamas	34	11	13	10	39	38	+1	35	
8	UFCI Tomar	34	13	9	12	30	33	−3	35	
9	UD Oliveirense	34	12	11	11	48	46	+2	35	
10	RD Águeda	34	11	12	11	30	36	−6	34	
11	CD Fátima	34	9	15	10	31	31	0	33	
12	Lusitânia Lourosa	34	9	14	11	32	34	−2	32	
13	CD Torres Novas	34	10	12	12	29	38	−9	32	
14	GD Mealhada	34	10	11	13	33	39	−6	31	
15	Naval 1º Maio	34	6	13	15	41	55	−14	25	Relegation to Terceira Divisão
16	SC Covilhã	34	6	10	18	31	47	−16	22	Relegation to Terceira Divisão
17	CA Mirandense	34	4	12	18	23	53	−30	20	Relegation to Terceira Divisão
18	União Santarém	34	7	5	22	31	69	−38	19	Relegation to Terceira Divisão

=== Segunda Divisão - Zona Sul ===
Pos	Team	Pld	W	D	L	GF	GA	GD	Pts	Promotion or relegation
1	Amora FC	34	22	9	3	60	15	+45	53	Promotion to Liga de Honra
2	CDR Quarteirense	34	15	8	11	48	35	+13	38	
3	União Santiago	34	13	12	9	47	36	+11	38	
4	Juventude de Évora	34	13	11	10	48	35	+13	37	
5	Lusitano VRSA	34	11	15	8	39	31	+8	37	
6	Lusitano Évora	34	13	11	10	33	32	+1	37	
7	FC Alverca	34	11	15	8	39	31	+8	37	
8	CD Montijo	34	12	12	10	42	38	+4	36	
9	O Elvas CAD	34	10	15	9	25	28	−3	35	
10	SL Fanhões	34	11	12	11	31	29	+2	34	
11	FC Barreirense	34	8	18	8	30	27	+3	34	
12	Esperança Lagos	34	10	14	10	32	38	−6	34	
13	Atlético CP	34	12	10	12	43	50	−7	34	
14	Vasco da Gama AC Sines	34	10	12	12	35	44	−9	32	
15	SG Sacavenense	34	8	15	11	36	40	−4	31	Relegation to Terceira Divisão
16	Imortal DC	34	9	9	16	30	40	−10	27	Relegation to Terceira Divisão
17	SC Lusitânia	34	6	14	14	21	43	−22	26	Relegation to Terceira Divisão
18	Silves FC	34	2	8	24	21	69	−48	12	Relegation to Terceira Divisão
