= Gila (footballer) =

Portuguese football coach and former player

Personal information
- Full name: Virgílio José Pereira do Nascimento
- Date of birth: 5 February 1967 (age 59)
- Place of birth: Alcobaça, Portugal
- Height: 1.81 m (5 ft 11 1/2 in)
- Position: Defender

Youth career
- 1981–1983: Concha Azul
- 1983–1985: Ginásio Alcobaça

Senior career*
Years	Team	Apps	(Gls)
1985–1990	Ginásio Alcobaça		
1990–1993	Caldas	93	(19)
1993–1996	Campomaiorense	70	(7)
1996–2000	Beira-Mar	108	(11)
2000–2001	União da Madeira	29	(1)
2001–2002	Beneditense	23	(1)
2002–2003	Caldas	27	(3)

Managerial career
- 2003–2004: Caldas
- 2005–2006: Pampilhosa
- 2007–2008: Bombarralense
- 2008–2011: Caldas
- * Club domestic league appearances and goals

Virgílio José Pereira do Nascimento, known as Gila (born 5 February 1967) is a Portuguese football coach and a former player.

== Club career ==
He made his Primeira Liga debut for Campomaiorense on 20 August 1995 in a game against Vitória Guimarães.

== Honours ==
Beira-Mar

- Taça de Portugal: 1998–99
