= Fernando Castro Santos =

Spanish footballer and manager

Personal information
- Full name: Fernando Castro Santos
- Date of birth: 20 February 1952 (age 74)
- Place of birth: Poio, Spain
- Position: Defender

Youth career
- 1966–1971: Pontevedra

Senior career*
Years	Team	Apps	(Gls)
1971–1981	Pontevedra	223	(6)

Managerial career
- 1983–1988: Pontevedra
- 1988–1989: Arenteiro
- 1989–1995: Compostela
- 1995–1997: Celta
- 1997–1998: Braga
- 1998–1999: Sevilla
- 1999–2000: Tenerife
- 2001–2002: Poli Ejido
- 2002–2003: Braga
- 2003: Córdoba
- 2004–2005: Almería
- 2006–2007: Vecindario
- 2008: Poli Ejido
- 2010: Leixões
- 2010–2011: Pontevedra
- * Club domestic league appearances and goals

Fernando Castro Santos (born 20 February 1952) is a Spanish former professional football defender and manager.

During his career, he worked in several clubs in his country as well as in Portugal.

== Playing career ==
Born in Poio, Province of Pontevedra. Santos spent his entire career with local club Pontevedra CF. His professional input consisted of 24 Segunda División matches in the 1976–77 season, being relegated.

== Coaching career ==
Santos began working as a manager at only 31 with Pontevedra, before moving to Galician neighbours SD Compostela in 1989. During his six-year spell at the latter club, he led it from Tercera División to La Liga.

After helping Compos to retain their top-division status in the 1994–95 campaign, Santos stayed in the region, signing with RC Celta de Vigo and remaining two years there. He started 1997–98 in Portugal with S.C. Braga, being fired in January 1998 (the side eventually reached the final of the Taça de Portugal) and returning to his country with Sevilla FC.

Santos left Sevilla in January 1999, as the team eventually promoted to the top flight with his successor Marcos Alonso at the helm. He spent the following years at CD Tenerife, Polideportivo Ejido, Córdoba CF, UD Almería and UD Vecindario, all in the Spanish second tier. He again was in charge of Braga in the 2002–03 season, meeting the same fate and later taking the club to court for unfounded dismissal.

Santos went back to Portugal on 9 February 2010, as a replacement for the sacked José Mota at Leixões SC. On 21 October, he took over from Ángel Viadero in a return to Pontevedra, not being able to prevent relegation from Segunda División B as third-bottom.

== Personal life ==
Santos' son, Diego Castro, was also a professional footballer. A winger, he represented with success Sporting de Gijón and Perth Glory FC.

== See also ==
- List of one-club men
