= 1997–98 Segunda Divisão de Honra =

64th season of second-tier football league in Portugal

Segunda Divisão de Honra
- Season: 1997–98
- Champions: UD Leiria
- Promoted: UD Leiria; SC Beira-Mar; FC Alverca
- Relegated: Académico Viseu; SCU Torreense; Nacional Funchal

The 1997–98 Segunda Divisão de Honra season was the eighth season of the competition and the 64th season of recognised second-tier football in Portugal.

== Overview ==
The league was contested by 18 teams with UD Leiria winning the championship and gaining promotion to the Primeira Liga along with SC Beira-Mar and FC Alverca. At the other end of the table Académico Viseu, SCU Torreense and Nacional Funchal were relegated to the Segunda Divisão.

== League standings ==
Pos	Team	Pld	W	D	L	GF	GA	GD	Pts	Promotion or relegation
1	União de Leiria (C, P)	34	20	10	4	73	32	+41	70	Promotion to Primeira Divisão
2	Beira-Mar (P)	34	18	10	6	41	26	+15	64	Promotion to Primeira Divisão
3	Alverca (P)	34	19	5	10	64	35	+29	62	Promotion to Primeira Divisão
4	Gil Vicente	34	16	12	6	44	23	+21	60	
5	Penafiel	34	17	8	9	63	48	+15	59	
6	Feirense	34	13	10	11	39	39	0	49	
7	Estoril	34	11	13	10	40	39	+1	46	
8	Felgueiras	34	11	12	11	38	42	−4	45	
9	Maia	34	13	6	15	50	47	+3	45	
10	Espinho	34	12	8	14	45	43	+2	44	
11	Moreirense	34	12	6	16	48	53	−5	42	
12	União da Madeira	34	11	8	15	36	48	−12	41	
13	Paços de Ferreira	34	8	17	9	34	39	−5	41	
14	União de Lamas	34	11	7	16	37	55	−18	40	
15	Desportivo das Aves	34	11	5	18	48	64	−16	38	
16	Académico de Viseu (R)	34	8	9	17	30	45	−15	33	Relegation to Segunda Divisão B
17	Torreense (R)	34	7	9	18	31	62	−31	30	Relegation to Segunda Divisão B
18	Nacional (R)	34	6	9	19	37	58	−21	27	Relegation to Segunda Divisão B

(C) Champions; (P) Promoted; (R) Relegated
