= 1999–2000 in Portuguese football =

1999-2000 Portuguese football season.

== Portuguese Liga ==
The 1999/2000 season of the Portuguese First Division began on August 20, 1999, and ended on May 14. Sporting CP became champions for the first time in eighteen years.

== Promoted teams ==
These teams were promoted from the Portuguese Second Division of Honour at the start of the season:

- Gil Vicente FC (2nd Division of Honour champions)
- CF «Os Belenenses» (2nd placed)
- CD Santa Clara (3rd placed)

== Relegated teams ==
These teams were relegated to the Portuguese Second Division of Honour at the end of the season:

- Vitória FC de Setúbal (16th placed)
- Rio Ave FC (17th placed)
- CD Santa Clara (18th placed)

== Primeira Liga ==
Pos	Team	Pld	W	D	L	GF	GA	GD	Pts	Qualification or relegation
1	Sporting CP (C)	34	23	8	3	57	22	+35	77	Qualification to Champions League group stage
2	Porto	34	22	7	5	66	26	+40	73	Qualification to Champions League third qualifying round
3	Benfica	34	21	6	7	58	33	+25	69	Qualification to UEFA Cup first round
4	Boavista	34	16	7	11	40	31	+9	55	Qualification to UEFA Cup qualifying round
5	Gil Vicente	34	14	11	9	48	34	+14	53	
6	Marítimo	34	13	11	10	42	36	+6	50	
7	Vitória de Guimarães	34	14	6	14	48	43	+5	48	
8	Estrela da Amadora	34	10	15	9	40	35	+5	45	
9	Braga	34	12	7	15	44	45	−1	43	
10	Leiria	34	10	12	12	31	35	−4	42	
11	Alverca	34	11	8	15	39	48	−9	41	
12	Belenenses	34	9	13	12	36	38	−2	40	
13	Campomaiorense	34	10	6	18	31	51	−20	36	
14	Farense	34	8	11	15	35	60	−25	35	
15	Salgueiros	34	9	7	18	30	49	−19	34	
16	Vitória de Setúbal (R)	34	9	6	19	25	49	−24	33 (Note: Vitória de Setúbal: 4 points)	Relegation to Segunda Liga
17	Rio Ave (R)	34	8	9	17	34	54	−20	33 (Note: Rio Ave: 1 point)	Relegation to Segunda Liga
18	Santa Clara (R)	34	7	10	17	35	50	−15	31	Relegation to Segunda Liga

Source: Infordesporto
Rules for classification: 1) points; 2) head-to-head points; 3) head-to-head goal difference; 4) goal difference; 5) number of goals scored
(C) Champions; (R) Relegated
