= Joaquim Nabuco =

Brazilian writer, abolitionist, and statesman

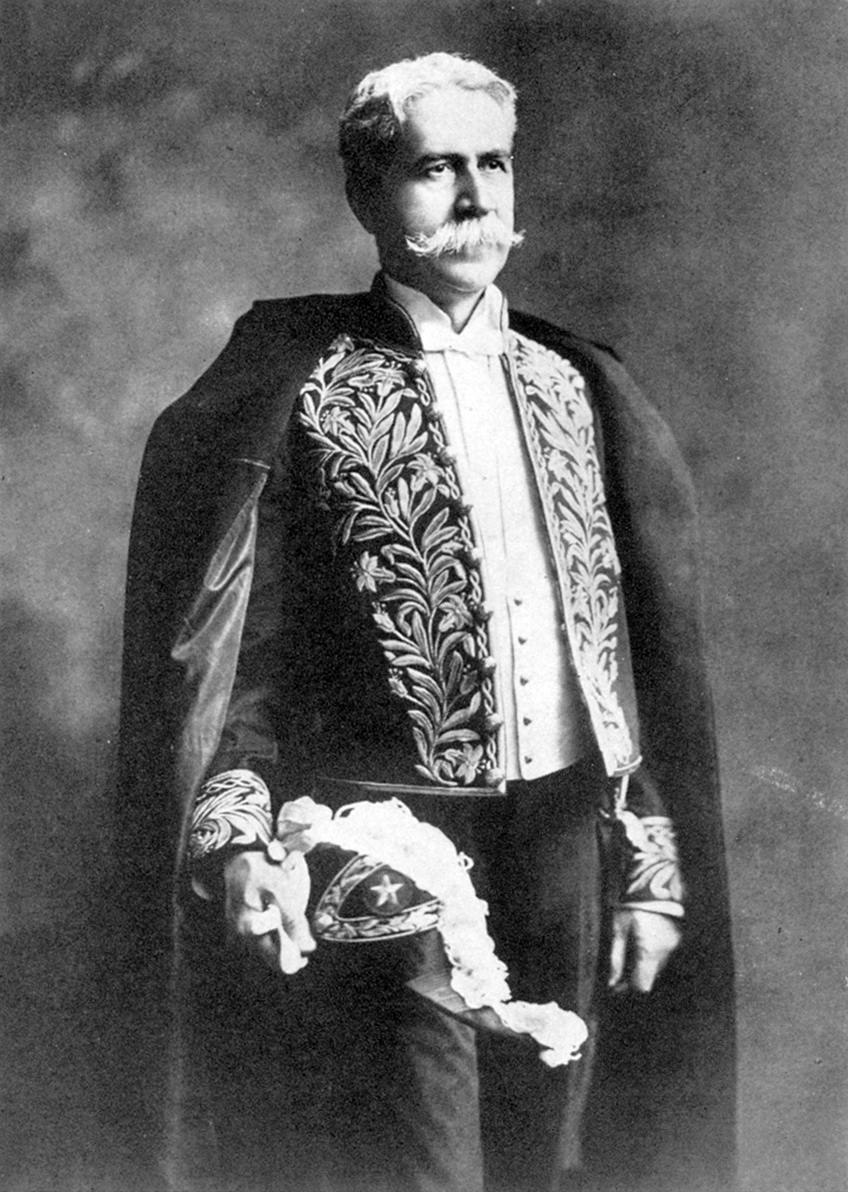
- Nabuco in 1902

Ambassador of Brazil to the United States
- In office May 23, 1905 – January 17, 1910
- Nominated by: Rodrigues Alves
- Preceded by: Alfredo de Morais Gomes Ferreira
- Succeeded by: Domício da Gama

Ambassador of Brazil to the United Kingdom
- In office February 4, 1901 – January 10, 1905
- Nominated by: Campos Sales
- Preceded by: João Artur de Sousa Correia
- Succeeded by: Francisco Régis de Oliveira

Member of the Chamber of Deputies
- In office July 3, 1885 – November 15, 1889
- Constituency: Pernambuco
- In office January 13, 1879 – January 17, 1882
- Constituency: Pernambuco

Personal details
- Born: Joaquim Aurélio Barreto Nabuco de Araújo; August 19, 1849 Recife, Pernambuco, Brazil
- Died: January 17, 1910 (aged 60) Washington, D.C., U.S.
- Spouse: Evelina Torres Soares Ribeiro (m. 1889)
- Children: Maurício; Joaquim; Carolina; Mariana; José Tomás
- Education: Faculty of Law of Recife
- Occupation: Diplomat and politician
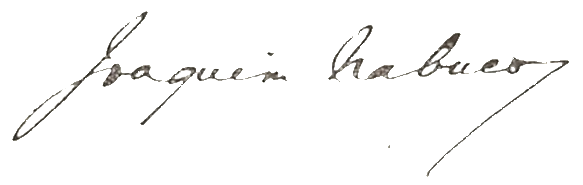
- Signature

Joaquim Aurélio Barreto Nabuco de Araújo (August 19, 1849 – January 17, 1910) was a Brazilian statesman, diplomat, a leading voice in the abolitionist movement of his country, historian, jurist, journalist, and one of the founders of the Brazilian Academy of Letters (Academia Brasileira de Letras).

He was one of the great diplomats of the Empire of Brazil, and also an orator, a poet, and a memoirist. Alongside O Abolicionismo (Abolitionism), Minha Formação (My Formation) stands as a memoir of the highest order, where one perceives the paradox of someone who grew up in a family of slaveholders but chose to fight for the abolition of slavery. Nabuco confessed to feeling a "nostalgia for the slaves" due to their generosity, which contrasted with the selfishness of their masters. "Slavery will remain for a long time as the national characteristic of Brazil," he affirmed.

== Early life and education ==
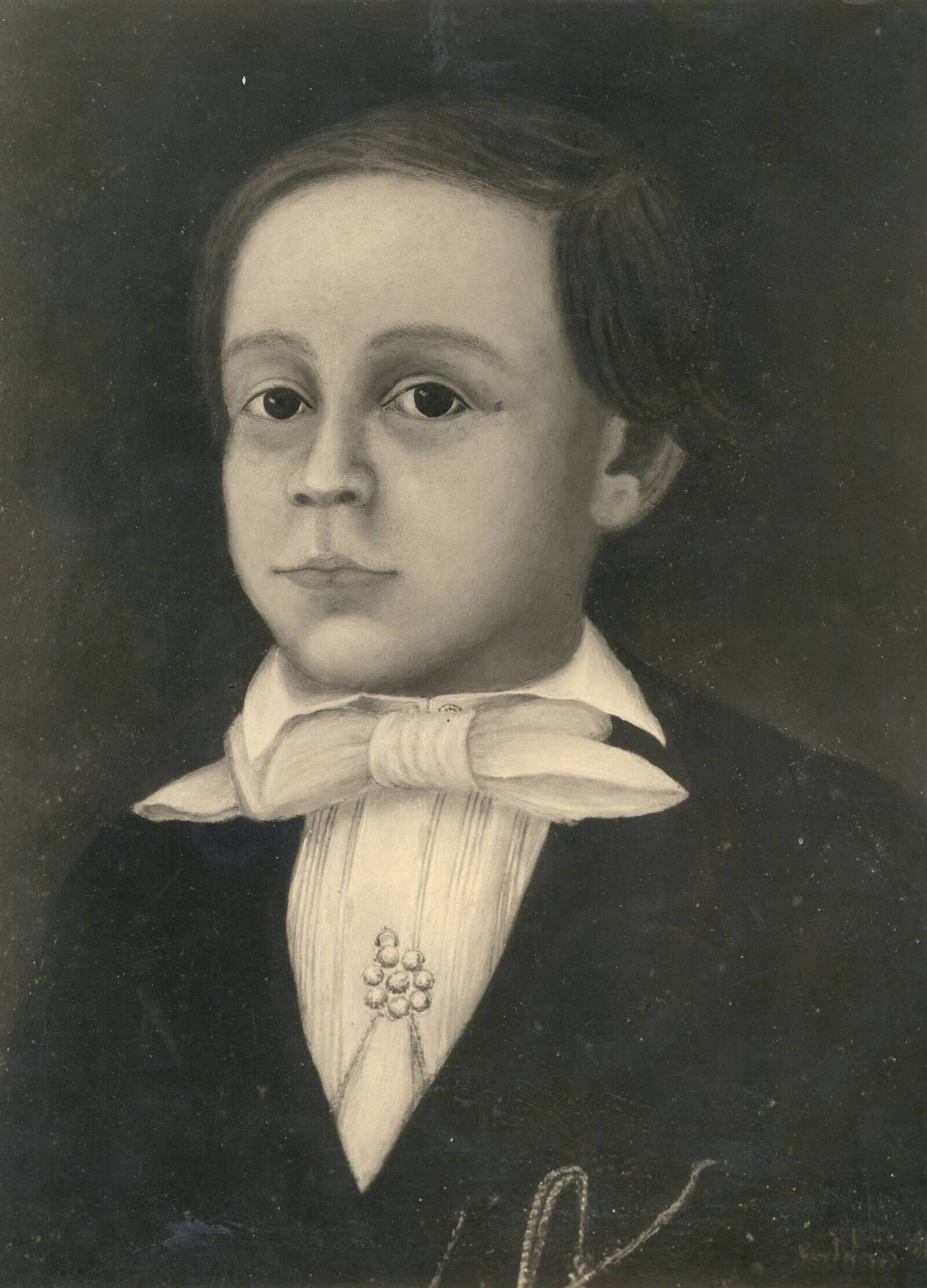
Portrait at the age of 7, 1856

Born in Brazil, Joaquim was the son of a major political figure in the Brazilian Empire, José Tomás Nabuco (1813–1878), a lifetime senator, counselor of state, and wealthy landowner. José made his move from conservativism to liberalism in the 1860s, establishing the Liberal Party in 1868, and supporting the reforms that would lead to the abolition of slavery in 1888.

== Personal life ==
Joaquim Nabuco spent most of his time traveling and living abroad between 1873-1878. As a young adult, Nabuco had a 14-year relationship with financier and philanthropist Eufrásia Teixeira Leite, who was one of the richest people in the world at the time. The romance with Nabuco began during a trip by ship to Europe, in 1873, and would last until 1887, when Eufrásia sent her last letter to Joaquim Nabuco. Two years later, at 38 years old, he married Evelina Torres Soares Ribeiro. Nabuco was a friend of the famous writer Machado de Assis.

== Career ==
After returning to Brazil in 1878, Nabuco began his public fight against slavery through his political activity and in his writings. He campaigned against slavery in the Chamber of Deputies from 1878, and he founded the Brazilian Anti-Slavery Society. In 1883, he wrote probably the most important work against slavery in the Portuguese language: O Abolicionismo. Although he was largely responsible for the abolition of slavery in 1888, historians have wondered if he feared that the number of enslaved people would "Africanize" Brazil. He is quoted as saying, "Free labor and slave labor cannot coexist, and neither can slavery and immigration". However, it is hard to explain, under this view, why Nabuco would want Africans to become free citizens when slave traffic had already been prohibited.

After the overthrow of the Brazilian monarchy he retired from public life for a period of time.

He later became the first ambassador from Brazil to the United States from 1905–1910, which marked a significant shift in his country's role in the world arena. Nabuco realized the importance for Brazil, and other South American nations, to develop a united relationship with the North American stage. In Washington, he worked with Elihu Root who also supported this idea of Pan-Americanism. He spent many years in both England and France, where he was a strong proponent of Pan-Americanism, presiding over the third Pan-American Conference which was held in Rio de Janeiro in 1906. Following Nabuco's death on January 17, 1910, the Pan-American Building in Washington, D.C. was finally completed. At the dedication ceremony the Secretary of State said the following words about him: “One voice that should have spoken here today is silent, but many of us cannot forget or cease to mourn and to honor our dear and noble friend, Joaquim Nabuco. Ambassador from Brazil, dean of the American diplomatic corps, respected, admired, trusted, loved and followed by all of us, he was a commanding figure in the international movement of which the creation of this building is part…”

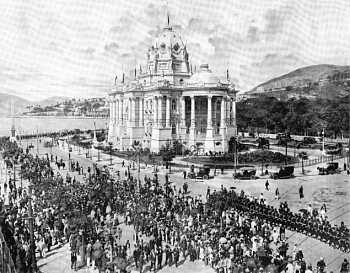
Funeral procession of Joaquim Nabuco in front of the Palácio Monroe, 1910

His best known work is his autobiography Minha formação, published in 1900. It vividly portrays the slave-holding society in 19th century Brazil.

Of his major works, Minha formação and O abolicionismo have been translated into English, as My Formative Years and Abolitionism respectively.

Preceded by Antônio Peregrino Maciel Monteiro (patron)	Brazilian Academy of Letters – occupant of the 27th chair 1897–1910	Succeeded by Dantas Barreto
Preceded by Alfredo de Morais Gomes Ferreira	Ambassador of Brazil to the United States; 1905–1910	Succeeded by Domício da Gama
