= Fernando Pereira (Portuguese footballer) =

Portuguese football manager and former player

Personal information
- Full name: Fernando Manuel Seixas Pereira
- Date of birth: 27 June 1968 (age 58)
- Place of birth: Vila Real, Portugal
- Height: 1.78 m (5 ft 10 in)
- Position: Midfielder

Team information
- Current team: Anadia (manager)

Youth career
- 1980–1981: Sanguinhedo
- 1981–1982: Bairro Latino
- 1982–1986: Vila Real

Senior career*
Years	Team	Apps	(Gls)
1986–1988	Vila Real		
1988–1989	Chaves	1	(0)
1989–1990	Recreio de Águeda		
1990–1991	Fafe		
1991–1993	Vila Real		
1993–1994	Penafiel	30	(0)
1994	Paços de Ferreira	3	(0)
1995	Leça	1	(0)
1995–1999	Beira-Mar	66	(4)
1999–2000	Maia	10	(0)
2000–2001	Recreio de Águeda	15	(0)

Managerial career
- 2005–2006: Beira-Mar (U-17)
- 2006–2007: Gafanha
- 2007–2008: Recreio de Águeda
- 2008–2009: Avanca
- 2009–2010: Nelas
- 2010–2013: Recreio de Águeda
- 2013–2014: Anadia
- 2014–2015: Braga B
- 2015–: Anadia
- * Club domestic league appearances and goals

Fernando Manuel Seixas Pereira (born 27 June 1968) is a Portuguese football manager and a former player. He is the manager of Anadia.

== Club career ==
He made his Primeira Liga debut for Chaves on 21 May 1989 in a game against Fafe.

== Honours ==
Beira-Mar

- Taça de Portugal: 1998–99
