= Eufrásia Teixeira Leite =

Brazilian businesswoman

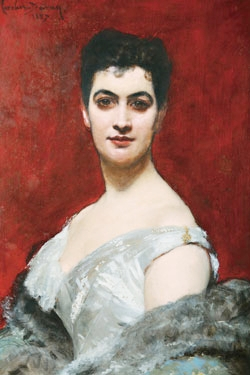
- Born: 15 April 1850; Vassouras, Rio de Janeiro, Empire of Brazil
- Died: 13 September 1930 (aged 80); Rio de Janeiro, Federal District, Brazil
- Education: Madame Grivet Girls' School
- Occupations: Financial investor and philanthropist

Eufrásia Teixeira Leite (5 April 1850 – 13 September 1930) was a Brazilian aristocrat, heiress, financial investor and philanthropist. She left in testament a fortune that could buy 1850 kg of gold, at the prices of the time, having been one of the richest people in the world that time, and whose greater part was bequeathed to assisting educational institutions of the city of Vassouras. Alone, Eufrásia multiplied the family fortune several times and would be a billionaire by today's standards.

== Early life ==
She was the youngest daughter of Dr. Joaquim José Teixeira Leite and Ana Esméria Correia e Castro, being the paternal granddaughter of the Baron of Itambé, maternal granddaughter of the Baron of Campo Belo, niece of Baron of Vassouras and grand-niece of Baron of Aiuruoca. She had a single sister, Francisca Bernardina Teixeira Leite (1845–1899), and a brother who died as a child.

Her paternal grandfather's family was already very wealthy when she moved from Conceição da Barra de Minas to Vassouras. Her father and uncle Baron of Vassouras established themselves as capitalists, founding in Rio de Janeiro the company "Casa Teixeira Leite & Sobrinhos", which lent money to interest and made financial intermediation with the prosperous coffee farmers. On the other hand, his mother's family was composed only of rich coffee planters, being a member of the traditional Correia e Castro family.

By Brazilian standards at the time, she received an aristocratic education, having studied at the Madame Grivet Girls' School, which existed in the locality of Comércio, today Sebastião Lacerda, in Vassouras. In addition to basic education, she learned good manners, speaking French and playing the piano.

== Heritage ==
On the death of her parents, in 1872, Eufrásia and her sister inherited a fortune of 767:937$876 réis (767 contos, nine hundred and thirty-seven thousand, eight hundred and seventy-six réis), which at the time was equivalent to the endowment Personnel of the Emperor Dom Pedro II or 5% of Brazilian exports. Soon after, in 1873, her grandmother, the Baroness of Campo Belo, died, and the sisters received as their inheritance another 106:844$886 (one hundred and six contos, eight hundred and forty-eight thousand, eight hundred and eighty-six réis) in form of titles and slaves.

At the time, the region of Vassouras fell into decay, due to the exhaustion of the soil and the aging of the slaves, but the sisters' assets were not coffee farms; They had public debt securities of the National Loan of 1868, Banco do Brasil shares, bank deposits, personal loans, only 12 slaves, a house in Rio de Janeiro and a large urban property in Vassouras, now known as Casa da Hera or Chácara da Hera, where they lived with their parents.

Young and unmarried, the sisters sold shares, titles and the house of Rio de Janeiro, collected credits, freed the slaves, closed the farmhouse, left two employees in charge of their conservation, and departed in 1873 to reside in Paris.

== Romance ==
Eufrásia, besides being intelligent and skilled with business, was a very beautiful woman, as shown by several pictures and portraits.

When she traveled to Europe, she met the diplomat Joaquim Nabuco on the ship and began a relationship with him. The amorous letters she received from Joaquim Nabuco were, tradition says, by her express instructions, enclosed in her coffin. The letters and tickets that she sent to Joaquim Nabuco, are stored in the Instituto Joaquim Nabuco de Pesquisas Sociais, in Recife. Some of these letters suggest that something very intimate, beyond the standards of the time, would have occurred between the two.

Most of the romance took place in Europe, where Eufrásia had financial and worldly interests. Joaquim Nabuco, however, had political ambitions in Brazil. The romance lasted from 1873 to 1887, when Eufrásia sent the last letter to Joaquim Nabuco. Two years later, he married Evelina Torres Soares Ribeiro. Eufrásia was never married.

== Life in Europe ==
Eufrásia had the entrepreneurial spirit of the family and invested her fortune and that of her sister in several European countries, buying shares of companies that produced with the new technologies of the Second Industrial Revolution and participating in the internationalization of capitals that happened at the time. She is said to have been the first woman to enter the Paris Stock Exchange.

She settled in Paris, residing after 1884 with her sister in a hôtel particulier of five floors, in the street Bassano 40, 8th arrondissement, next to the Arc de Triomphe, sophisticated address until the present day. The sisters lived a modest life, but participated in the social life of Paris. Eufrásia joined the circle of friends closest to Isabel, Princess Imperial of Brazil, when she was already in exile in France.

Her sister, Francisca Bernardina, had a serious deformation in the basin and died in Paris in 1899 without having been married. Thus, Eufrásia also inherited the fortune of the sister.

Between 1874 and 1928 she came only twice to Brazil, but traveled to several other countries. She saw World War I in Europe and lamented the damage to buildings.

== Return to Brazil and death ==
She returned to Brazil permanently in 1928 and spent several seasons at the Casa da Hera in Vassouras. She remained almost a recluse, so much so that she even bought, in 1924, the farm of Dr. Calvet, next to the Hera farm, only to keep away from the neighbors.

She lived her last years in Rio de Janeiro, in an apartment in Copacabana, surrounded by faithful, eccentric and solitary employees. She wanted to return to Paris, but she had kidney problems that prevented her from traveling.

Without "descendants or ascendants," her first will bequeathed all her fortune to the Institute of the Missionaries of the Sacred Heart of Jesus, a Catholic institution based in Rome, but which ran several educational establishments in Brazil. A second will, on the eve of her death, bequeathed practically all her fortune to works of charity, to be carried out by institutions of the city of Vassouras.

She was buried in Rio de Janeiro. Subsequently, her body was exhumed and buried in the mausoleum of her grandfather, the 1st Baron of Itambé, in Vassouras. In the place there is no tombstone that indicates the grave of Eufrásia.

== See also ==
- Vassouras
- Joaquim Nabuco
