= 1998–99 Taça de Portugal =

Tournament details
- Country: Portugal
- Dates: September 1998 – 19 June 1999

Final positions
- Champions: Beira-Mar (1st title)
- Runners-up: Campomaiorense

The 1998–99 Taça de Portugal was the 59th edition of the Portuguese football knockout tournament, organized by the Portuguese Football Federation (FPF). The 1998–99 Taça de Portugal began in September 1998. The final was played on 19 June 1999 at the Estádio Nacional.

Porto were the previous holders, having defeated Braga 3–1 in the previous season's final. Defending champions Porto were eliminated in the fifth round by third division side Torreense. Beira-Mar defeated Campomaiorense, 1–0 in the final to win their first Taça de Portugal. As a result of Beira-Mar winning the domestic cup competition, the Auri-negros faced 1998–99 Primeira Divisão winners Porto in the 1999 Supertaça Cândido de Oliveira.

== Fourth round ==
All fourth round cup ties were played on 10 January. Ties which ended in a draw were replayed at a later date. The fourth round saw teams from the Primeira Liga (I) enter the competition.

Home team	Score	Away team
Alverca (II)	2–1	Câmara de Lobos (III)
Beira-Mar (I)	4–2	Futebol Benfica (IV)
Benfica (I)	4–1	Académica de Coimbra (I)
Caçadores das Taipas (II)	1–0	Felgueiras (II)
Campomaiorense (I)	3–2	Braga (I)
Estrela da Amadora (I)	0–0 (aet)	Farense (I)
Estrela Vendas Novas (IV)	1–3	Marítimo (I)
Fafe (III)	1–2	Vitória de Setúbal (I)
Feirense II)	3–1	Oliveira do Bairro (IV)
Gil Vicente (II)	3–2	Sporting CP (I)
Gondomar (III)	2–0	Olhanense (III)
Juventude de Évora (III)	1–3	Boavista (I)
Leça (II)	3–0	Amora (III)
Loures (IV)	0–1	Esposende (III)
Maia (II)	3–0	Seixal (III)

Home team	Score	Away team
Nacional (III)	3–4	Rio Tinto (IV)
Naval (II)	3–0	Caldas (III)
Portimonense (III)	4–1	Águeda (IV)
Paços de Ferreira (II)	3–0	Sanjoanense (III)
Penafiel (II)	0–0 (aet)	Imortal (III)
Porto (I)	4–2 (aet)	Famalicão (III)
Portomosense (IV)	1–0	Sesimbra (IV)
São João de Ver (III)	2–1	Oriental (III)
Sporting da Covilhã (III)	2–4	Salgueiros (I)
Torreense (III)	2–0	Chaves (I)
União de Leiria (I)	2–1	Rio Ave (I)
Vilafranquense (III)	2–3 (aet)	Pevidém (IV)
Vilanovense (IV)	3–3 (aet)	Santa Clara (II)
Vitória de Guimarães (I)	2–3	Moreirense (II)

=== Replays ===
Home team	Score	Away team
Farense (I)	3–2	Estrela da Amadora (I)
Imortal (III)	0–1	Penafiel (II)

Home team	Score	Away team
Santa Clara (II)	3–1	Vilanovense (IV)

== Fifth round ==
Ties were played on 16 February. Due to the odd number of teams involved at this stage of the competition, Alverca qualified to the next round due to having no opponent to face at this stage of the competition.

16 February 1999	Beira-Mar (I)	7–0	Portomosense (IV)	Estádio Mário Duarte, Aveiro
	Quintas 35'; Carlos André 42'; Paulo Sérgio 51'; Gila 76'; Ricardo Sousa 77'; Fary 87'; Rakovič 90'

16 February 1999	Boavista (I)	2–1	Farense (I)	Estádio do Bessa, Porto
	Ayew 12'; Timofte 87' (pen.)		Paulo Sérgio 44'

16 February 1999	Esposende (II)	2–0	Naval (II)	Estádio Padre Sá Pereira, Esposende
	Petit 21'; Bambo 55'

16 February 1999	Feirense (II)	0–1	Pevidém (IV)	Estádio Marcolino de Castro, Santa Maria da Feira
			Pedro Fidalgo 86'

16 February 1999	Gil Vicente (II)	4–1	Santa Clara (II)	Estádio Adelino Ribeiro Novo, Barcelos
	Moreira 5', 79'; Casquilha 11'; Lemos 24'		Youssef 61'

16 February 1999	Gondomar (III)	3–4	Paços de Ferreira (II)	Estádio de São Miguel, Gondomar
	Bobó 8'; Adalberto 13' (o.g.); Armando 45'		Ricardo António 33'; Marco Ferreira 34', 66'; Carlos Miguel 58'

16 February 1999	Leça (II)	0–1	União de Leiria (I)	Estádio do Leça FC, Leça da Palmeira
			Artur Jorge Vicente 70'

16 February 1999	Maia (II)	5–0	São João de Ver (III)	Estádio José Vieira de Carvalho, Maia

16 February 1999	Marítimo (I)	3–2 (a.e.t.)	Salgueiros (I)	Estádio dos Barreiros, Funchal
	Alex 47', 78'; Herivelto 93'		Celso 33'; Abílio 88' (pen.)

16 February 1999	Penafiel (II)	0–1	Campomaiorense (I)	Estádio Municipal 25 de Abril, Penafiel
			Laelson 40'

16 February 1999	Portimonense (III)	1–2	Moreirense (II)	Estádio Municipal de Portimão, Portimão
	Emerson 89'		Orlando 1'; Altino 18'

16 February 1999	Porto (I)	0–1	Torreense (II)	Estádio das Antas, Porto
			Oeiras 85'

16 February 1999	Rio Tinto (IV)	0–1 (a.e.t.)	Caçadores das Taipas (III)	Estádio Cidade de Rio Tinto, Rio Tinto
			Zé Manel 120'

16 February 1999	Vitória de Setúbal (I)	2–0	Benfica (I)	Estádio do Bonfim, Setúbal
	Conde 16'; Chipenda 89'

== Sixth round ==
Ties were played between the 7 March to the 8 April. Due to the odd number of teams involved at this stage of the competition, Torreense qualified for the quarter-finals due to having no opponent to face at this stage of the competition.

7 March 1999	Alverca (I)	0–3	Campomaiorense (I)	Complexo Desportivo FC Alverca, Alverca do Ribatejo
			René Rivas 44'; Laelson 64'; Isaías 69'

7 March 1999	Beira-Mar (I)	1–1 (a.e.t.)	União de Leiria (I)	Estádio Mário Duarte, Aveiro
	Simić 5' (pen.)		Bilro 15'

7 March 1999	Caçadores das Taipas (III)	1–2	Esposende (II)	Estádio do Montinho, Caldas das Taipas
	Martinho 90'		Rui Peneda 7'; Telmo Pinto 41'

7 March 1999	Marítimo (I)	5–1	Pevidém (IV)	Estádio dos Barreiros, Funchal
	Toni 10', 67'; Tarik 37'; Herivelto 51', 83'		Armando 74'

7 March 1999	Vitória de Setúbal (I)	4–0	Paços de Ferreira (II)	Estádio do Bonfim, Setúbal
	Frechaut 1'; Hélio 11'; Gasimov 31', 60'

27 March 1999	Boavista (I)	3–2 (a.e.t.)	Gil Vicente (II)	Estádio do Bessa, Porto
	Quevedo 28'; Ayew 55', 100'		Ricardo Silva 38', 63'

28 March 1999 Replay	União de Leiria (I)	1–2	Beira-Mar (I)	Estádio Dr. Magalhães Pessoa, Leiria
	Ricardo Silva 74'		Fary 50'; Jorge Neves 88'

8 April 1999	Moreirense (II)	3–2	Maia (II)	Parque de Jogos Comendador Joaquim de Almeida Freitas, Moreira de Cónegos
	Fernando Jorge 5'; Armando 85'; Orlando 90'		Rui Miguel 12'; Fran Alonso 27'

== Quarter-finals ==
Ties were played on 11 April, whilst replays were played between the 21–28 April.

11 April 1999	Esposende (II)	1–0	Boavista (I)	Estádio Padre Sá Pereira, Esposende
	Nuno Sousa 23'

11 April 1999	Marítimo (I)	2–2 (a.e.t.)	Campomaiorense (I)	Estádio dos Barreiros, Funchal
	Romeu 49', 83'		Rivas 4', 34'

11 April 1999	Moreirense (II)	1–1 (a.e.t.)	Beira-Mar (I)	Parque de Jogos Comendador Joaquim de Almeida Freitas, Moreira de Cónegos
	Gomes 31'; Cristiano (yellow card) 104' (yellow-red card) 117'		Simić 47' (pen.); Eusébio (yellow card) 60' (yellow-red card) 91'

11 April 1999	Torreense (III)	0–0 (a.e.t.)	Vitória de Setúbal (I)	Campo Manuel Marques, Torres Vedras

21 April 1999 Replay	Beira-Mar (I)	1–0	Moreirense (II)	Estádio Mário Duarte, Aveiro
	Gila 69'

28 April 1999 Replay	Campomaiorense (I)	0–0 (a.e.t.) (6–5 p)	Marítimo (I)	Estádio Capitão Cesar Correia, Campo Maior
			Rui Óscar (yellow card) 91' (yellow-red card) 110'	Referee: Luís Miranda

28 April 1999 Replay	Vitória de Setúbal (I)	3–0	Torreense (III)	Estádio do Bonfim, Setúbal
	Pedro Henriques 6'; Chiquinho Conde 25'; Rui Carlos 31'

== Semi-finals ==
Ties were played on 5 May.

5 May 1999	Beira-Mar (I)	1–0	Vitória de Setúbal (I)	Estádio Mário Duarte, Aveiro
	Ricardo Sousa 33'

5 May 1999	Esposende (II)	0–2	Campomaiorense (I)	Estádio Padre Sá Pereira, Esposende
			Isaías 37'; Demétrius 69'

== Final ==
19 June 1999
17:00 WEST

Beira-Mar	1–0	Campomaiorense
Ricardo Sousa 70'

Estádio Nacional, Oeiras
Attendance: 25,000
Referee: Lucílio Batista (Setúbal)
