= Eusébio (footballer, born 1966) =

Portuguese footballer

Personal information
- Full name: Eusébio Amaro Lopes Guimarães
- Date of birth: 26 August 1966 (age 60)
- Place of birth: Santo Tirso, Portugal
- Height: 1.87 m (6 ft 1 1/2 in)
- Position: Midfielder

Youth career
- 1979–1981: São Martinho
- 1981–1982: Vitória Guimarães
- 1983–1985: Tirsense

Senior career*
Years	Team	Apps	(Gls)
1985–1991	Tirsense		
1991–1993	Braga	57	(1)
1993–1995	Beira-Mar	57	(0)
1995–1996	Tirsense	30	(2)
1996–1999	Beira-Mar	62	(1)
1999–2000	Freamunde	35	(4)
2001	Ovarense	4	(0)
2001–2002	Tirsense		
- * Club domestic league appearances and goals

Eusébio Amaro Lopes Guimarães, known as Eusébio (born 26 August 1966) is a former Portuguese football player.

He played 8 seasons and 232 games in the Primeira Liga for Tirsense, Beira-Mar and Braga.

== Club career ==
He made his Primeira Liga debut for Tirsense on 20 August 1989 in a game against Boavista.

== Honours ==
Beira-Mar

- Taça de Portugal: 1998–99
