= Victor Ferreira (basketball) =

Dutch basketball player

Personal information
- Born: 10 July 1986 (age 40)
- Listed height: 1.90 m (6 ft 3 in)

Career information
- Playing career: 2010–2011
- Position: Small forward

Career history
- 2010–2011: Rotterdam Challengers

Victor Ferreira (born 10 July 1986) is a Dutch former professional basketball player who played for the Dutch Basketball League club Rotterdam Challengers during the 2010–2011 season. He played in 3 DBL games in his career, in which he averaged 7 minutes and 1.7 points per game.
