= Saša Simić =

Serbian footballer and sports agent

Personal information
- Full name: Saša Simić
- Date of birth: 22 April 1969 (age 57)
- Place of birth: Loznica, SFR Yugoslavia
- Height: 1.67 m (5 ft 6 in)
- Position: Winger

Senior career*
Years	Team	Apps	(Gls)
1988–1993	Sloboda Užice	55	(1)
1993–1994	Borac Čačak		
1994–1996	União Madeira	52	(18)
1996–1998	Boavista	29	(3)
1998–1999	Beira-Mar	31	(8)
1999–2002	União Madeira	81	(26)
2002–2003	Machico		
Total		248	(56)
- * Club domestic league appearances and goals

Saša Simić (Serbian Cyrillic: Саша Симић; born 22 April 1969) is a Serbian retired footballer who played as a winger. He later became a sports agent.

== Career ==
Simić started out with Sloboda Užice in the Yugoslav Second League and was teammates with Ljubinko Drulović in the 1988–89 and 1989–90 seasons. He later played for Borac Čačak, alongside Damir Čakar and Ivica Dragutinović, helping the club win the Second League of FR Yugoslavia in the 1993–94 season.

In the summer of 1994, Simić moved abroad to Portugal and signed with União Madeira. He was later transferred to Boavista, helping the side win the Taça de Portugal in 1997. The team included such players as Jimmy Floyd Hasselbaink and Nuno Gomes, among others.

After spending two seasons at Boavista, Simić switched to fellow Primeira Liga club Beira-Mar. He helped them win the 1998–99 Taça de Portugal, before returning to União Madeira for another three seasons.

== Honours ==
Borac Čačak

- Second League of FR Yugoslavia: 1993–94

Boavista

- Taça de Portugal: 1996–97
- Supertaça Cândido de Oliveira: 1997

Beira-Mar

- Taça de Portugal: 1998–99
