= Antônio Peregrino Maciel Monteiro, 2nd Baron of Itamaracá =

Brazilian politician

Baron of Itamaracá
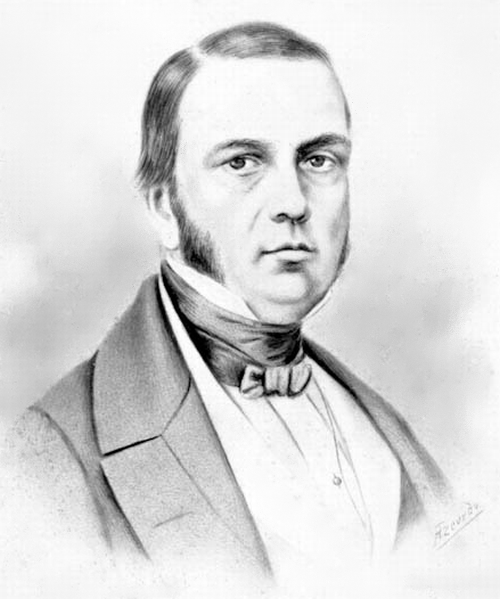

Minister of Foreign Affairs
- In office 19 September 1837 – 16 April 1839
- Preceded by: Francisco de Montezuma
- Succeeded by: Cândido Batista de Oliveira

Personal details
- Born: 30 April 1804 Recife, Pernambuco, Brazil
- Died: 5 January 1868 (aged 63) Lisbon, Portugal
- Education: University of Paris
- Occupation: Poet, orator, diplomat, politician, physician, journalist

Antônio Peregrino Maciel Monteiro, 2nd Baron of Itamaracá (April 30, 1804 – January 5, 1868) was a Brazilian poet, orator, diplomat, politician, physician and journalist. He is the patron of the 27th chair of the Brazilian Academy of Letters, patron of the 7th chair of the Pernambucan Academy of Letters, and of the 23rd chair of the National Academy of Medicine.

== Life ==
Monteiro was born in Recife, Pernambuco, to Manuel Francisco Maciel Monteiro (who was the brother of the previous Baron of Itamaracá, Tomás Antônio Maciel Monteiro) and Manuela Lins de Melo. After making preparatory studies in Olinda, he went to France in 1823, where he graduated in Medicine, Science and Letters at the University of Paris. In 1829, he returned to Recife, where he becomes a doctor for a short time — he would abandon his medical career to become a politician.

He was a provincial deputy in 1833 and a general deputy from 1834 to 1844, and again from 1850 to 1853. He was also the minister of Foreign Affairs from 1837 to 1839, and the headmaster of the Faculdade de Direito de Olinda from 1839 to 1844. As a journalist, he worked for journals O Lidador, A Carranca and A União. In 1853, following his diplomatic career, he went to Lisbon, where his diplomatic acting would give him the title of second Baron of Itamaracá, in a post that would last until his death, in 1868. His remains were brought to Pernambuco in 1870, and, in 1872, he was buried at a mausoleum built for him, in the bairro of Santo Amaro, in Recife.

== Works ==
Monteiro's poems were published posthumously, in 1905, under the name Poesias (Poetry).

| Preceded by Tomás Antônio Maciel Monteiro | Baron of Itamaracá; 1853 — 1868 | Succeeded by None |
| Preceded by New creation | Brazilian Academy of Letters - Patron of the 27th chair | Succeeded by Joaquim Nabuco (founder) |
