= Tomás Antônio Maciel Monteiro, 1st Baron of Itamaracá =

Brazilian magistrate and politician

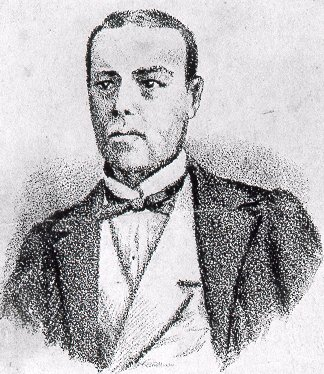
Tomás Antônio Maciel Monteiro

Tomás Antônio Maciel Monteiro, 1st Baron of Itamaracá (1780 – November 22, 1847) was a Brazilian politician and magistrate. He was born in Recife, Pernambuco, to Antônio Francisco Monteiro and Joana Ferreira Maciel Gouvim.

In 1804, he was sent to the University of Coimbra, where he graduated in law in 1809.

Returning to Brazil, he studied at the Faculdade de Direito de Recife. He married Ana Augusta Tavares Osório Maciel da Costa, daughter of João Severiano Maciel da Costa, the Marquess of Queluz.

He was the deputy and later vice-governor of Pernambuco from 1839 to 1840, and the minister of the Brazilian Supreme Federal Court in 1842.

He was proclaimed the Baron of Itamaracá in 1843, in a post that would last until his death, in 1847.

Monteiro had a brother, named Manuel Francisco Maciel Monteiro, who was the father of Antônio Peregrino Maciel Monteiro, who would be the 2nd Baron of Itamaracá.

Preceded by New creation	Baron of Itamaracá; 1843–1847	Succeeded by Antônio Peregrino Maciel Monteiro
