= Orlando Monteiro =

Portuguese footballer

Personal information
- Full name: Orlando Semedo Monteiro
- Date of birth: 18 May 1972 (age 54)
- Place of birth: Praia, Portuguese Cape Verde
- Height: 1.77 m (5 ft 9 1/2 in)
- Position: Forward

Youth career
- 1985–1986: Seixal
- 1987–1988: Paio Pires
- 1988–1989: Miratejo

Senior career*
Years	Team	Apps	(Gls)
1992–1994	Arrentela		
1994	Torreense	3	(0)
1994–1995	Beneditense	32	(10)
1995–1997	Estrela Amadora	18	(0)
1997–1998	Académico Viseu	13	(2)
1998–2000	Moreirense	55	(4)
2000–2003	Penafiel	65	(4)
2003	Lixa	6	(0)
2004	Covilhã	14	(0)
Total		206	(20)

International career
2000–2003	São Tomé and Príncipe	2	(0)
- * Club domestic league appearances and goals

Orlando Semedo Monteiro (born 18 May 1972) is a retired footballer who played as a forward.

== Club career ==
Born in Praia, Portuguese Cape Verde, Monteiro spent his entire professional career in Portugal, mostly in its Segunda Liga. His Primeira Liga input consisted of two seasons with Lisbon-based club C.F. Estrela da Amadora, his debut in the competition occurring on 30 September 1995 when he came on as a 72nd-minute substitute in a 1–1 home draw against C.S. Marítimo.

Monteiro retired in 2004 at the age of 32, after splitting the campaign with lower league club F.C. Lixa and S.C. Covilhã in the second division.
