= 1998–99 Primeira Divisão =

65th season of top-tier Portuguese football

Primeira Divisão
- Season: 1998–99
- Champions: Porto; 18th title
- Relegated: Beira-Mar; Chaves; Académica
- Champions League: Porto (group stage); Boavista (third qualifying round)
- UEFA Cup: Benfica (first round); Sporting CP (first round); Vitória de Setúbal (first round)
- Matches: 306
- Goals: 810 (2.65 per match)
- Top goalscorer: Mário Jardel (36 goals)
- Biggest home win: Porto 7–0 Beira-Mar (24 January 1999)
- Biggest away win: Campomaiorense 0–5 Benfica (29 November 1998); Académica 0–5 Alverca (3 April 1999)
- Highest scoring: Porto 7–1 Académica Coimbra (16 May 1999); Chaves 4–4 Farense (21 February 1999); Salgueiros4–4 Beira-Mar (30 May 1999)

The 1998–99 Primeira Divisão was the 65th edition of top flight of Portuguese football. It started on 23 August 1998 with a match between Chaves and Académica Coimbra, and ended on 30 May 1999. The league was contested by 18 clubs with Porto as the defending champions.

Porto won the league and qualified for the 1999–2000 UEFA Champions League group stage, along with Boavista, who qualified for the third round. With the extinction of the UEFA Cup Winners' Cup, the Taça de Portugal winner qualified for the UEFA Cup, so Beira-Mar joined Benfica, Sporting CP and Vitória de Setúbal in the 1999-2000 UEFA Cup. In the opposite direction, Beira-Mar, Chaves and Académica Coimbra were relegated to the Liga de Honra. Mário Jardel was the top scorer with 36 goals.

== Promotion and relegation ==
=== Teams relegated to Liga de Honra ===
- Leça
- Varzim
- Belenenses

Leça, Varzim and Belenenses were consigned to the Liga de Honra following their final classification in the 1997–98 season.

=== Teams promoted from Liga de Honra ===
- União de Leiria
- Beira-Mar
- Alverca

The other three teams were replaced by União de Leiria, Beira-Mar, Alverca from the Liga de Honra.

== Teams ==
=== Stadia and locations ===
Location of teams in Primeira Divisão 1998-99 (Mainland)
Location of teams in Primeira Divisão 1998-99 (Madeira)

Team	Head coach	City	Stadium	1997–98 finish
Académica Coimbra	(Portugal) Raul Águas	Coimbra	Estádio Cidade de Coimbra	15th
Alverca	(Mozambique) Mário Wilson	Alverca	Complexo do Alverca	3rd in Divisão de Honra
Beira-Mar	(Portugal) António Sousa	Aveiro	Estádio Mário Duarte	2nd in Divisão de Honra
Benfica	(Scotland) Graeme Souness	Lisbon	Estádio da Luz	2nd
Boavista	(Portugal) Jaime Pacheco	Porto	Estádio do Bessa	6th
Braga	(Portugal) Vítor Oliveira	Braga	Estádio Primeiro de Maio	10th
Campomaiorense	(Portugal) João Alves	Campo Maior	Estádio Capitão Cesar Correia	11th
Chaves	(Portugal) Horácio Gonçalves	Chaves	Estádio Municipal de Chaves	16th
Estrela da Amadora	(Portugal) Jorge Jesus	Amadora	Estádio José Gomes	7th
Farense	(Spain) Paco Fortes	Faro	Estádio de São Luís	14th
Marítimo	(Portugal) Augusto Inácio	Funchal	Estádio dos Barreiros	5th
Porto	(Portugal) Fernando Santos	Porto	Estádio das Antas	1st
Rio Ave	(Portugal) Carlos Brito	Vila do Conde	Estádio dos Arcos	9th
Salgueiros	(Portugal) Dito	Porto	Estádio Engenheiro Vidal Pinheiro	8th
Sporting CP	(Croatia) Mirko Jozic	Lisbon	Estádio José Alvalade	4th
União de Leiria	(Portugal) Mário Reis	Leiria	Estádio Dr. Magalhães Pessoa	1st in Divisão de Honra
Vitória de Guimarães	(Serbia and Montenegro) Zoran Filipovic	Guimarães	Estádio D. Afonso Henriques	3rd
Vitória de Setúbal	(Portugal) Carlos Cardoso	Setúbal	Estádio do Bonfim	13th

=== Managerial changes ===
Team	Outgoing manager	Date of vacancy	Position in table	Incoming manager	Date of appointment
Braga	(Portugal) Vítor Oliveira	25 October 1998	9th	(Portugal) Carlos Manuel	26 October 1998
Campomaiorense	(Portugal) João Alves	29 November 1998	18th	(Portugal) José Pereira	30 November 1998
Marítimo	(Portugal) Augusto Inácio	20 December 1998	16th	(Portugal) Nelo Vingada	21 December 1998
Chaves	(Portugal) Horácio Gonçalves	3 January 1999	17th	(Portugal) Augusto Inácio	4 January 1999
Vitória de Guimarães	(Serbia and Montenegro) Zoran Filipovic	3 January 1999	10th	(Portugal) Quinito	4 January 1999
Farense	(Spain) Paco Fortes	5 February 1999	14th	(Portugal) João Alves	6 February 1999
Académica Coimbra	(Portugal) Raul Águas	7 February 1999	18th	(Portugal) Gregório Freixo	8 February 1999
Braga	(Portugal) Carlos Manuel	26 February 1999	10th	(Portugal) Manuel Cajuda	27 February 1999
Alverca	(Mozambique) Mário Wilson	28 February 1999	17th	(Portugal) José Romão	1 March 1999
Chaves	(Portugal) Augusto Inácio	26 April 1999	17th	(Spain) Rodríguez Vaz	14 May 1999
Benfica	(Scotland) Graeme Souness	2 May 1999	3rd	(Portugal) Shéu	3 May 1999

== League table ==
Pos	Team	Pld	W	D	L	GF	GA	GD	Pts	Qualification or relegation
1	Porto (C)	34	24	7	3	85	26	+59	79	Qualification to Champions League group stage
2	Boavista	34	20	11	3	57	29	+28	71	Qualification to Champions League third qualifying round
3	Benfica	34	19	8	7	71	29	+42	65	Qualification to UEFA Cup first round
4	Sporting CP	34	17	12	5	64	32	+32	63	Qualification to UEFA Cup first round
5	Vitória de Setúbal	34	15	8	11	37	38	−1	53	Qualification to UEFA Cup first round
6	União de Leiria	34	14	10	10	36	29	+7	52	
7	Vitória de Guimarães	34	14	8	12	53	41	+12	50	
8	Estrela da Amadora	34	11	12	11	33	40	−7	45	
9	Braga	34	10	12	12	38	50	−12	42	
10	Marítimo	34	10	11	13	44	45	−1	41	
11	Farense	34	10	9	15	39	54	−15	39	
12	Salgueiros	34	7	17	10	45	55	−10	38	
13	Campomaiorense	34	10	7	17	41	51	−10	37	
14	Alverca	34	8	11	15	36	50	−14	35	
15	Rio Ave	34	8	11	15	26	47	−21	35	
16	Beira-Mar (R)	34	6	15	13	36	53	−17	33	UEFA Cup first round and relegation to Segunda Liga (Note: Beira-Mar qualified for the UEFA Cup as Portuguese Cup winners)
17	Chaves (R)	34	5	10	19	39	70	−31	25	Relegation to Segunda Liga
18	Académica (R)	34	4	9	21	30	70	−40	21	Relegation to Segunda Liga

Source: Primeira Divisão
Rules for classification: 1st points, 2nd head-to-head, 3rd goals average
(C) Champions; (R) Relegated

== Results ==
Home \ Away	ACA	ALV	BEM	BEN	BOA	BRA	CPM	CHA	EST	FAR	MAR	POR	RAV	SAL	SCP	ULE	VGU	VSE
Académica		0–5	1–0	0–3	2–3	1–1	1–5	1–2	2–2	2–1	1–3	0–2	1–1	0–1	2–2	0–1	1–1	2–0
Alverca	2–1		1–1	0–2	0–0	0–0	2–1	3–1	0–1	1–3	3–0	1–5	0–1	1–1	3–2	0–2	2–1	1–0
Beira-Mar	0–2	2–1		1–1	1–1	4–2	2–1	1–1	0–0	0–1	1–1	2–1	1–2	4–1	2–2	1–1	0–0	1–1
Benfica	3–0	2–2	3–0		0–3	4–1	1–1	4–1	2–0	5–0	3–1	1–1	3–1	5–0	3–3	0–0	3–1	2–0
Boavista	3–1	3–0	2–1	2–1		1–0	2–1	4–1	2–1	3–0	1–2	0–0	1–0	2–1	2–2	1–0	2–0	1–1
Braga	2–2	0–0	2–1	2–1	1–2		0–2	1–0	1–1	0–0	1–1	3–3	2–0	1–1	2–0	2–4	2–1	3–0
Campomaiorense	2–1	2–2	4–1	0–5	1–1	2–0		4–1	3–0	3–1	0–2	0–2	0–0	0–0	0–0	0–3	1–0	1–2
Chaves	1–0	1–1	1–0	0–4	1–1	1–2	3–2		4–1	4–4	1–1	0–4	0–0	1–1	2–2	1–2	2–3	1–2
Estrela da Amadora	2–1	1–0	1–2	0–1	2–1	0–0	1–0	2–1		2–1	1–0	1–1	1–0	1–1	0–1	1–1	1–1	5–0
Farense	2–0	1–0	2–1	1–0	2–2	0–2	2–1	2–1	1–1		0–0	0–3	0–1	2–1	1–3	1–1	1–2	1–1
Marítimo	4–1	3–3	1–1	1–0	3–0	3–0	0–1	2–2	1–1	1–3		0–1	2–0	2–2	1–3	3–2	1–0	0–1
Porto	7–1	3–1	7–0	3–1	0–2	1–0	2–0	1–0	2–0	2–0	1–0		4–0	4–1	3–2	3–1	2–0	6–0
Rio Ave	1–1	0–0	1–1	0–2	0–2	1–2	3–1	1–1	1–1	2–2	2–1	1–1		2–1	0–1	1–0	0–1	1–1
Salgueiros	1–1	0–0	4–4	1–1	0–0	1–1	1–1	2–0	1–1	4–2	2–2	1–3	5–1		2–1	0–0	3–2	1–0
Sporting CP	5–0	2–0	0–0	1–2	1–1	4–1	3–0	2–1	3–0	1–0	2–0	1–1	2–0	3–1		2–0	3–0	0–0
União de Leiria	1–0	1–0	1–0	1–1	0–0	0–0	3–1	3–1	0–1	2–1	1–0	2–2	2–0	1–0	0–3		0–1	0–1
Vitória de Guimarães	1–1	3–1	3–0	0–2	2–3	5–1	2–0	6–1	3–0	1–0	1–1	3–2	3–0	3–3	1–1	0–0		2–0
Vitória de Setúbal	1–0	4–0	0–0	1–0	1–3	3–0	2–0	1–0	2–0	1–1	3–1	1–2	1–2	3–0	1–1	1–0	1–0	

Source: Foradejogo (in Portuguese)
Legend: Blue = home team win; Yellow = draw; Red = away team win.

== Top goalscorers ==
Rank	Player	Club	Goals
1	(Brazil) Mário Jardel	Porto	36
2	(Portugal) Nuno Gomes	Benfica	24
3	(Brazil) Demétrius	Campomaiorense	16
3	(Brazil) Silva	Braga	16
5	(Ghana) Ayew	Boavista	15
5	(Romania) Timofte	Boavista	15
5	(Canada) Alex Bunbury	Marítimo	15
8	(Mozambique) Chiquinho Conde	Vitória Setúbal	14
8	(Slovenia) Zahovic	Porto	14
10	(Bulgaria) Yordanov	Sporting	13
10	(Brazil) Edmilson	Vitória de Guimarães	13

== Attendances ==
#	Club	Average
1	Benfica	27,941
2	Porto	24,342
3	Sporting	18,088
4	Vitória SC	6,676
5	Braga	5,765
6	Boavista	5,353
7	Vitória FC	5,065
8	Marítimo	4,794
9	Rio Ave	4,765
10	Farense	4,588
11	Beira-Mar	4,147
12	Académica	3,647
13	União de Leiria	3,588
14	Chaves	3,441
15	Salgueiros	3,265
16	Estrela da Amadora	2,759
17	Campomaiorense	2,735
18	Alverca	2,676

== See also ==
- 1998–99 in Portuguese football
