= 1996–97 Segunda Divisão de Honra =

63rd season of second-tier football league in Portugal

Segunda Divisão de Honra
- Season: 1996–97
- Champions: SC Campomaiorense
- Promoted: SC Campomaiorense; Varzim SC; Académica Coimbra
- Relegated: SC Covilhã; CD Beja; FC Tirsense

The 1996–97 Segunda Divisão de Honra season was the seventh season of the competition and the 63rd season of recognised second-tier football in Portugal.

== Overview ==
The league was contested by 18 teams with SC Campomaiorense winning the championship and gaining promotion to the Primeira Liga along with Varzim SC and Académica Coimbra. At the other end of the table SC Covilhã, CD Beja and FC Tirsense were relegated to the Segunda Divisão.

== League standings ==
Pos	Team	Pld	W	D	L	GF	GA	GD	Pts	Promotion or relegation
1	Campomaiorense (C, P)	34	18	8	8	51	32	+19	62	Promotion to Primeira Divisão
2	Varzim (P)	34	18	5	11	49	52	−3	59	Promotion to Primeira Divisão
3	Académica (P)	34	17	7	10	39	21	+18	58	Promotion to Primeira Divisão
4	Felgueiras	34	14	12	8	41	33	+8	54	
5	Penafiel	34	13	12	9	38	29	+9	51	
6	União de Lamas	34	13	8	13	37	32	+5	47	
7	Estoril	34	13	8	13	34	35	−1	47	
8	Desportivo das Aves	34	13	8	13	44	47	−3	47	
9	Paços de Ferreira	34	11	13	10	39	41	−2	46	
10	Beira-Mar	34	12	10	12	36	32	+4	46	
11	União da Madeira	34	11	10	13	40	45	−5	43	
12	Feirense	34	10	12	12	48	47	+1	42	
13	Moreirense	34	10	12	12	45	44	+1	42	
14	Académico de Viseu	34	11	9	14	34	38	−4	42	
15	Alverca	34	9	13	12	31	30	+1	40	
16	Sporting da Covilhã (R)	34	9	11	14	30	41	−11	38	Relegation to Segunda Divisão B
17	Beja (R)	34	9	10	15	44	55	−11	37	Relegation to Segunda Divisão B
18	Tirsense (R)	34	8	6	20	25	51	−26	30	Relegation to Segunda Divisão B

(C) Champions; (P) Promoted; (R) Relegated
