= Carlos André (footballer, born 1971) =

Portuguese football coach and former player

Personal information
- Full name: Carlos André Paulino de Oliveira
- Date of birth: 28 November 1971 (age 54)
- Place of birth: Lisbon, Portugal
- Height: 1.79 m (5 ft 10 1/2 in)
- Position: Midfielder

Youth career
- 1982–1988: Porto Salvo
- 1988–1990: Estoril

Senior career*
Years	Team	Apps	(Gls)
1990–1992	Estoril	1	(0)
1992–1999	Beira-Mar	101	(7)
1999	Penafiel	10	(0)
2000–2001	Gil Vicente	41	(5)
2001	Vitória Guimarães	4	(0)
2002	Walsall	5	(0)
2002–2003	Braga	8	(0)
2003–2004	Maia	17	(3)
2004–2005	Ahlen	11	(0)
2005–2006	Unirea Urziceni		
2008–2010	Sanjoanense		

Managerial career
- 2013–2014: Beira-Mar (assistant)
- * Club domestic league appearances and goals

Carlos André Paulino de Oliveira, known as Carlos André (born 28 November 1971) is a Portuguese football coach and a former player.

== Club career ==
He made his Primeira Liga debut for Estoril on 15 March 1992 in a game against Salgueiros.

== Honours ==
Beira-Mar

- Taça de Portugal: 1998–99
