= 1999–2000 Segunda Liga =

66th season of second-tier football league in Portugal

Segunda Divisão de Honra
- Season: 1999–2000
- Champions: FC Paços de Ferreira
- Promoted: FC Paços de Ferreira; SC Beira-Mar; CD Aves
- Relegated: Moreirense FC; AD Esposende; SC Covilhã

The 1999–2000 Segunda Liga season was the tenth season of the competition and the 66th season of recognised second-tier football in Portugal.

== Overview ==
The league was contested by 18 teams with FC Paços de Ferreira winning the championship and gaining promotion to the Primeira Liga along with SC Beira-Mar and CD Aves. At the other end of the table Moreirense FC, AD Esposende and SC Covilhã were relegated to the Segunda Divisão.

== League standings ==
Pos	Team	Pld	W	D	L	GF	GA	GD	Pts	Promotion or relegation
1	Paços de Ferreira (C, P)	34	19	8	7	56	31	+25	65	Promotion to Primeira Liga
2	Beira-Mar (P)	34	18	11	5	54	30	+24	65	Promotion to Primeira Liga
3	Desportivo das Aves (P)	34	18	7	9	33	24	+9	61	Promotion to Primeira Liga
4	Varzim	34	17	9	8	53	33	+20	60	
5	Académica	34	16	9	9	55	37	+18	57	
6	Penafiel	34	14	14	6	52	33	+19	56	
7	Felgueiras	34	14	9	11	42	36	+6	51	
8	União de Lamas	34	14	4	16	39	50	−11	46	
9	Espinho	34	13	6	15	51	48	+3	45	
10	Freamunde	34	11	12	11	42	37	+5	45	
11	Leça	34	13	6	15	41	49	−8	45	
12	Chaves	34	11	11	12	46	45	+1	44	
13	Naval 1º Maio	34	11	9	14	53	55	−2	42	
14	Maia	34	11	9	14	35	44	−9	42	
15	Imortal	34	8	9	17	43	64	−21	33	
16	Moreirense (R)	34	6	11	17	29	49	−20	29	Relegation to Segunda Divisão B
17	Esposende (R)	34	8	4	22	31	65	−34	28	Relegation to Segunda Divisão B
18	Sporting da Covilhã (R)	34	5	10	19	23	48	−25	25	Relegation to Segunda Divisão B

(C) Champions; (P) Promoted; (R) Relegated
