= S.C. Campomaiorense =

Campomaiorense
- Full name: Sporting Clube Campomaiorense
- Nickname: Os Galgos (The Greyhounds)
- Founded: 1 July 1926; 100 years ago
- Ground: Estádio Capitão Cesar Correia, Campo Maior, Portalegre
- Capacity: 7,500
- Chairman: João Nabeiro
- Manager: Luís Maia
- League: Portugal – Segunda Liga
- 2011–12: 1st
Home colours	Away colours

Sporting Clube Campomaiorense, more commonly known as Campomaiorense, was a Portuguese football club from Campo Maior, Portalegre District. The club was founded on the 1 July 1926. The club currently plays at the Estádio Capitão Cesar Correia which holds a seating capacity of 7500. The club has played in Portugal's top football division, the Primeira Liga, for five seasons and reached the 1999 Taça de Portugal final.

Campomaiorense is part of the Portalegre Football Association, which is the football association in charge of the Portalegre district's football matters. In its entire history, the club has won eight major trophies: the Portuguese Second Division in the 1991–92 season, the Liga de Honra in the 1996–97 season, the AF Portalegre First Division on four occasions (1962–63, 1969–70, 1971–72, 2011–12), the Campeonato de Portalegre in 1946 and the AF Portalegre Supertaça in the 2011–12 season.

== History ==
The club was founded on 1 July 1926 and became the branch number 27 of Sporting Clube de Portugal. Campomaiorense was promoted for the first time to Primeira Liga in 1995 under the guidance of former Sporting CP star striker Manuel Fernandes. The club was only the third club in the Alentejo region to reach the top division (the two others being Lusitano de Évora in the 1950s and 60s and O Elvas in the 1940s and 1980s). Their spell in the 1995–96 season resulted in a disappointing campaign, starting the championship with a 7–0 defeat away to Sporting CP and eventually leading to relegation. Further poor results eventually forced club chairman João Manuel Nabeiro to sack Fernandes. New players arrived in mid-season, among them Jimmy Floyd Hasselbaink, who had just left Dutch club AZ. Diamantino Miranda was given the job with the goal of bringing the club back into the first league. Campomaiorense finished in 17th position.

The 1996–97 season in the second division earned them a first ever national title, with former Chaves and Paços de Ferreira striker Rudi being the top goalscorer. However, Diamantino's first half of the season in top-tier football was no better than Campomaiorense's first spell and he was also sacked by Nabeiro mid-season. Christmas brought coach João Alves (former Taça de Portugal winner with Estrela da Amadora in 1990) along with Brazilian players such as Isaías (previously with Benfica and Coventry City) and Demétrios. Alves' efforts earned Campomaiorense the 11th place and another year among the elite. The club underwent an ambitious change of image via a marketing campaign, changing its symbol to the greyhound and the green colors to bordeaux.

Managers seemed to only be fortunate in Campo Maior at the end of the season, and João Alves faith was no different from its predecessors. José Pereira had the honour to lead the team to the Taça de Portugal final in 1999, against Beira-Mar. This season all three major clubs' had soon been eliminated: Porto's shock defeat at third division side Torreense, Sporting CP's loss to Gil Vicente, and Benfica's to Vitória de Setúbal. In the final, people from all over Alentejo descended on Estádio Nacional in Jamor, where a banquet was offered by entrepreneur Rui Nabeiro, father of Campomaiorense chairman João Manuel Nabeiro, whose coffee Delta company Delta Cafés was the club's main sponsor. However, a late dramatic goal by Porto's on-loan midfielder Ricardo Sousa ended the dream for Campomaiorense who lost the match 0–1.

The club managed to remain in the top division for two more seasons, but following relegation in 2001 and inability to return the following year led to the decision to abandon professional football. The club dedicated the next years to competing only in the youth championships while looking for new talents. In 2006–07, the club was revived and began competing at the regional level. In the 2011–12, Campomaiorense finally won promotion from the district leagues to the Terceira Divisão, but renounced their participation in the national league.

== Honours ==
- Taça de Portugal
  - Runners-up (1): 1998–99
- Segunda Liga
  - Winners (1): 1996–97
- Segunda Divisão B
  - Winners (1): 1991–92
- AF Portalegre First Division
  - Winners (4): 1962–63, 1969–70, 1971–72, 2011–12
- Campeonato de Portalegre
  - Winners (1): 1945–46
- AF Portalegre Supertaça
  - Winners (1): 2011–12

== Notable players ==
- (Netherlands) Jimmy Floyd Hasselbaink
- (Portugal) Paulo Torres
- (Portugal) Carlos Martins
- (Portugal) Beto
- (Bulgaria) Stanimir Stoilov
- (Portugal) Jordão
- (Angola) Lito Vidigal
- (Brazil) Isaías
- (Angola) Fernando Sousa
- (Portugal) Rogério Matias
- (North Macedonia) Srgjan Zaharievski

== Managerial history ==
- (Portugal) Manuel Fernandes (1994 – 1995)
- (Portugal) Diamantino Miranda (1995 – 1997)
- (Portugal) João Alves (1997 – 1998)
- (Portugal) Carlos Manuel (1999 – 2000)
- (Portugal) Diamantino Miranda (2001)
- (Portugal) José Pereira

== League and cup history ==
Season	Tier	Pos.	Pl.	W	D	L	GS	GA	Pts	Cup	Notes
1990–91	3	2	34	21	6	11	53	37	48	Round 3	
1991–92	3	1	34	21	6	7	69	27	48	Round 3	Promoted
1992–93	2	15	34	10	5	19	40	53	25	Round 5	
1993–94	2	9	34	13	7	14	43	46	33	Round 3	
1994–95	2	2	34	19	8	7	58	27	46	Round 4	Promoted
1995–96	1	17	34	10	13	11	32	69	33	Round 6	Relegated
1996–97	2	1	34	18	8	8	51	32	62	Round 4	Promoted
1997–98	1	11	34	11	7	16	53	58	40	Round 4	^{[A]}
1998–99	1	13	34	10	7	17	41	51	37	Runners-up	^{[B]}
1999–00	1	13	34	10	6	18	31	51	36	Round 5	
2000–01	1	16	34	7	11	16	29	58	32	Round 4	Relegated
2001–02	2	10	34	13	6	15	48	50	45	Round 4	^{[C]}
2006–07	5	2	26	19	6	2	81	25	62		^{[D]}
2007–08	5	6	28	15	6	7	59	31	51	Round 1	
2008–09	5	5	32	17	7	8	58	34	58		
2009–10	5	1	12	12	0	0	57	2	36		^{[E]}
2010–11	5	2	16	14	1	1	63	8	43		^{[F]}
2011–12	5	1	28	23	1	4	93	14	70		Promoted

A. ^A Best league classification finish in the club's history.
B. ^B Best cup run in the club's history.
C. ^C The club folded and abandoned the professional football tier.
D. ^D The club was reinstated and began in the AF Portalegre First Division.
E. ^E Reached the playoffs, finished fifth in the final phase.
F. ^F Reached the playoffs, finished second in the final phase.

Last updated: 25 October 2012
Div. = Division; 1 = Portuguese League; 2 = Liga de Honra; 3 = Portuguese Second Division; 5 = AF Portalegre First Division
Pos. = Position; Pl = Match played; W = Win; D = Draw; L = Lost; GS = Goal scored; GA = Goal against; P = Points
