= 2015–16 Taça da Liga =

Taça CTT

Tournament details
- Host country: Portugal
- Dates: 1 August 2015 – 20 May 2016
- Teams: 37

Final positions
- Champions: Benfica (7th title)
- Runners-up: Marítimo

Tournament statistics
- Matches played: 48
- Goals scored: 127 (2.65 per match)
- Top scorer(s): Raúl Jiménez; Talisca (4 goals each)

The 2015–16 Taça da Liga was the ninth edition of the Taça da Liga, a football cup competition organized by the Liga Portuguesa de Futebol Profissional (LPFP) and contested exclusively by clubs competing in the top two professional tiers of Portuguese football. The competition was sponsored by CTT and, therefore, was known as Taça CTT.

A total of 37 teams contested this tournament, including 18 teams from the 2015–16 Primeira Liga and 19 non-reserve teams from the 2015–16 LigaPro. The competition format suffered changes relative to the previous season, with the first round (round-robin group stage) and second round (two-legged ties) being converted into single-legged knockout rounds.

Trophy holders Benfica defeated previous runners-up Marítimo in the final to extend their record in the competition to seven wins.

== Format ==
The competition format for the 2015–16 season consisted of three rounds followed by a knockout phase (semi-finals and final), but presents changes relative to the previous season. Nineteen teams competing in the 2015–16 LigaPro (reserve teams from Primeira Liga clubs are excluded) took part in the first round; one-legged ties were played between eighteen teams, with the nineteenth team receiving a bye to the next round.

In the second round, the ten teams advancing from the previous round (nine winners plus the team with a bye) were joined by the twelve teams placed 5th–16th in the 2014–15 Primeira Liga and by the two teams promoted to 2015–16 Primeira Liga. Again, one-legged ties were played between the twenty-four teams, with the winners advancing to the third round.

The third round featured the twelve winners of the previous round and the four best-placed teams in the 2014–15 Primeira Liga. The sixteen teams were drawn into four groups that were contested in a single round-robin format, with each team playing at least one game at home. The four group winners qualified for the semi-finals, which were played as single-legged ties. The final was played at a neutral venue.

Round	Teams entering in this round	Teams advancing from previous round
First round (19 teams)	19 teams competing in the 2015–16 LigaPro	
Second round (24 teams)	12 teams ranked 5th–16th in the 2014–15 Primeira Liga; 2 teams promoted to the 2015–16 Primeira Liga	9 winners from the first round; 1 team that received a bye
Third round (16 teams)	4 teams ranked 1st–4th in the 2014–15 Primeira Liga	12 winners from the second round
Semi-finals (4 teams)		4 group winners from the third round
Final (2 teams)		2 winners from the semi-finals

=== Tiebreakers ===
In the third round, teams are ranked according to points (3 points for a win, 1 point for a draw, 0 points for a loss). If two or more teams are tied on points on completion of the group matches, the following criteria are applied to determine the rankings:

1. highest goal difference in all group matches;
2. highest number of scored goals in all group matches;
3. lowest average age of all players fielded in all group matches (sum of the ages of all fielded players divided by the number of fielded players).

In all other rounds, teams tied at the end of regular time contest a penalty shootout to determine the winner.

== Teams ==
Thirty-seven teams competing in the two professional tiers of Portuguese football for the 2015–16 season were eligible to participate in this competition. For Primeira Liga teams, the final league position in the previous season determined in which round they enter the competition.

Third round (Primeira Liga)
Benfica (1st)	Porto (2nd)	Sporting CP (3rd)	Braga (4th)
Second round (Primeira Liga)
Vitória de Guimarães (5th)	Belenenses (6th)	Nacional (7th)	Paços de Ferreira (8th)
Marítimo (9th)	Rio Ave (10th)	Moreirense (11th)	Estoril (12th)
Boavista (13th)	Vitória de Setúbal (14th)	Académica (15th)	Arouca (16th)
Tondela (P1)	União da Madeira (P1)		
First round (LigaPro)
Gil Vicente (R1)	Penafiel (R1)	Chaves (3rd)	Sporting da Covilhã (4th)
Feirense (7th)	Freamunde (8th)	Farense (11th)	Académico de Viseu (12th)
Portimonense (14th)	Oriental (15th)	Olhanense (16th)	Oliveirense (17th)
Desportivo das Aves (18th)	Santa Clara (19th)	Leixões (20th)	Atlético CP (22nd)
Mafra (P2)	Famalicão (P2)	Varzim (P2)	

Key

- Nth: League position in the 2014–15 season
- P1: Promoted to the Primeira Liga
- P2: Promoted to the LigaPro
- R1: Relegated to the LigaPro

== Schedule ==
All draws were held at the LPFP headquarters in Porto, except for the draw for the first and second rounds, which took place in Loulé.

Round		Draw date	Match date(s)	Teams	Fixtures
First round		4 July 2015	1–2 August 2015	37 → 28	9
Second round		4 July 2015	September – October 2015	28 → 16	12
Third round	Matchday 1	28 October 2015	29–30 December 2015	16 → 4	24
Third round	Matchday 2	28 October 2015	19–21 January 2016	16 → 4	24
Third round	Matchday 3	28 October 2015	26–28 January 2016	16 → 4	24
Knockout phase	Semi-finals	28 October 2015	9–11 February 2016	4 → 2	2
Knockout phase	Final	28 October 2015	20 May 2016	2 → 1	1

Source: LPFP

== First round ==
The 19 non-reserve teams competing in the 2015–16 LigaPro entered the competition in this round. Eighteen teams were paired against each other for nine single-legged ties, while the nineteenth team (Famalicão) was given a bye to the next round. The draw took place on 4 July 2015, and matches were played on 1–2 August 2015.

1 August 2015	Oliveirense	1–1 (5–3 p)	Farense	Oliveira de Azeméis
18:00 WEST (UTC+01:00)	Carlitos 90+3'	Report	Rashid 6' (pen.)	Stadium: Estádio Carlos Osório; Attendance: 547; Referee: Hélder Lamas
	Penalties
	Mendonça (penalty scored); Godinho (penalty scored); Renan (penalty scored); Carlitos (penalty scored); Carela (penalty scored)		(penalty missed) Gomes; (penalty scored) Rashid; (penalty scored) Edinho; (penalty scored) Irobiso

2 August 2015	Mafra	0–2	Leixões	Mafra
16:00 WEST (UTC+01:00)		Report	Lamas 85' (pen.), 90+3'	Stadium: Estádio Municipal de Mafra; Attendance: 420; Referee: João Bento

2 August 2015	Gil Vicente	1–1 (4–5 p)	Académico de Viseu	Barcelos
16:00 WEST (UTC+01:00)	Ebralidze 27'	Report	Carvalho 45'	Stadium: Estádio Cidade de Barcelos; Attendance: 501; Referee: Rui Silva
	Penalties
	S. Costa (penalty missed); Mahamat (penalty scored); João Pedro (penalty missed); Gonçalves (penalty scored); Cadú (penalty scored); Soares (penalty scored); Lemos (penalty missed)		(penalty missed) Carvalho; (penalty missed) Borges; (penalty scored) Porto; (penalty scored) Bura; (penalty scored) Fábio; (penalty scored) T. Costa; (penalty scored) Ferreira

2 August 2015	Feirense	2–1	Sporting da Covilhã	Santa Maria da Feira
16:00 WEST (UTC+01:00)	Erivaldo 58', 73'	Report	Mailó 7'	Stadium: Estádio Marcolino de Castro; Attendance: 706; Referee: Pedro Campos

2 August 2015	Santa Clara	1–1 (5–6 p)	Atlético CP	Ponta Delgada, Azores
17:00 WEST (UTC+01:00)	Clemente 11'	Report	Vouho 68'	Stadium: Estádio de São Miguel; Attendance: 382; Referee: Duarte Oliveira
	Penalties
	Carraça (penalty scored); Ronaldo (penalty scored); Marocas (penalty missed); Batatinha (penalty scored); Silva (penalty scored); Pacheco (penalty scored); Freitas (penalty missed)		(penalty missed) Mbemba; (penalty scored) Vouho; (penalty scored) Malele; (penalty scored) Pires; (penalty scored) Ribeiro; (penalty scored) Au Yeung; (penalty scored) Djikiné

2 August 2015	Penafiel	2–0	Olhanense	Penafiel
17:00 WEST (UTC+01:00)	Barros 40', 42'	Report		Stadium: Estádio Municipal 25 de Abril; Attendance: 434; Referee: Daniel Cardoso

2 August 2015	Portimonense	3–0	Desportivo das Aves	Portimão
17:00 WEST (UTC+01:00)	Clemente 13'; Candé 24'; Fabrício 44'	Report		Stadium: Estádio Municipal de Portimão; Attendance: 756; Referee: Bruno Rebocho

2 August 2015	Chaves	0–2	Varzim	Chaves
17:00 WEST (UTC+01:00)		Report	Mourão 50'; Nelsinho 71'	Stadium: Estádio Municipal Eng. Manuel Branco Teixeira; Attendance: 0 (Note: The match between Chaves and Varzim was played behind closed doors due to punishment by FPF.); Referee: João Matos

2 August 2015	Oriental	1–1 (4–2 p)	Freamunde	Lisbon
17:00 WEST (UTC+01:00)	Gomes 47'	Report	Ansumane 61'	Stadium: Campo Eng. Carlos Salema; Attendance: 437; Referee: João Mendes
	Penalties
	Grilo (penalty scored); T. Tavares (penalty scored); Firmino (penalty scored); Gomes (penalty scored)		(penalty scored) Raínho; (penalty missed) Pereira; (penalty missed) Bruno; (penalty scored) Cafú

== Second round ==
In the second round, the nine first-round winners and Famalicão, who were given a bye to this round, joined the 12 teams ranked 5th–16th in the 2014–15 Primeira Liga and the two teams promoted from the 2014–15 Segunda Liga. These 24 teams were paired against each other into 12 single-legged ties, with the winners advancing to the next round. The draw took place on 4 July 2015, and matches were played through September and October 2015.

16 September 2015	Marítimo	2–1	Académica	Funchal, Madeira
16:00 WEST (UTC+01:00)	Costa 47'; João Diogo 57'	Report	Lopes 35' (pen.)	Stadium: Estádio dos Barreiros; Attendance: 2,322; Referee: Vasco Santos

23 September 2015	Oliveirense	1–2	Famalicão	Oliveira de Azeméis
15:00 WEST (UTC+01:00)	Léléco 36'	Report	Silvério 5'; Feliz 76'	Stadium: Estádio Carlos Osório; Attendance: 529; Referee: Hélder Malheiro

23 September 2015	Oriental	3–2	Estoril	Lisbon
16:00 WEST (UTC+01:00)	Mendes 32'; Varela 35'; Gomes 50'	Report	Luiz Phellype 18'; Bonatini 72' (pen.)	Stadium: Campo Eng. Carlos Salema; Attendance: 422; Referee: André Moreira

23 September 2015	Leixões	1–1 (5–4 p)	Académico de Viseu	Matosinhos
16:00 WEST (UTC+01:00)	Guo 72'	Report	Carvalho 58' (pen.)	Stadium: Estádio do Mar; Attendance: 521; Referee: Bruno Jesus
	Penalties
	Cadinha (penalty scored); Pedras (penalty missed); Lamas (penalty scored); Graça (penalty scored); Barros (penalty scored); Tandjigora (penalty scored)		(penalty missed) Carvalho; (penalty scored) Kiko; (penalty scored) Gradíssimo; (penalty scored) Porto; (penalty scored) Bura; (penalty missed) Costa

23 September 2015	União da Madeira	0–1	Paços de Ferreira	Ribeira Brava, Madeira
16:00 WEST (UTC+01:00)		Report	Martins 82'	Stadium: Centro Desportivo da Madeira; Attendance: 443; Referee: João Pinheiro

23 September 2015	Penafiel	1–2	Portimonense	Penafiel
16:00 WEST (UTC+01:00)	Mbala 90+4' (pen.)	Report	Fidélis 8'; Fabrício 90+2'	Stadium: Estádio Municipal 25 de Abril; Attendance: 207; Referee: Gonçalo Martins

10 October 2015	Atlético CP	0–2	Belenenses	Lisbon
15:30 WEST (UTC+01:00)		Report	Silva 11' (pen.); Sturgeon 50'	Stadium: Estádio da Tapadinha; Referee: Luís Godinho

10 October 2015	Tondela	0–0 (6–7 p)	Nacional	Tondela
16:00 WEST (UTC+01:00)		Report		Stadium: Estádio João Cardoso; Attendance: 534; Referee: Bruno Esteves
	Penalties
	Monteiro (penalty scored); Wágner (penalty scored); L. Machado (penalty missed); Nascimento (penalty scored); Berger (penalty scored); E. Machado (penalty scored); Baldé (penalty scored); Menga (penalty missed)		(penalty scored) Sequeira; (penalty scored) Soares; (penalty scored) Agra; (penalty scored) Gustavo; (penalty missed) Washington; (penalty scored) L. Aurélio; (penalty scored) J. Aurélio; (penalty scored) Ghazal

10 October 2015	Rio Ave	3–2	Vitória de Guimarães	Vila do Conde
18:00 WEST (UTC+01:00)	Capela 25'; Guedes 74', 90+1'	Report	Licá 54'; Valente 86'	Stadium: Estádio do Rio Ave FC; Referee: Manuel Oliveira

11 October 2015	Varzim	0–0 (3–4 p)	Arouca	Póvoa de Varzim
16:00 WEST (UTC+01:00)		Report		Stadium: Estádio do Varzim SC; Attendance: 849; Referee: Sérgio Piscarreta
	Penalties
	Organista (penalty missed); Hernâni (penalty scored); Cunha (penalty scored); Coentrão (penalty scored); Sá (penalty missed)		(penalty scored) Simão; (penalty scored) Adilson; (penalty scored) Nildo Petrolina; (penalty scored) Nelsinho

12 October 2015	Feirense	1–1 (4–3 p)	Boavista	Santa Maria da Feira
20:00 WEST (UTC+01:00)	Fabinho 13'	Report	Luisinho 2'	Stadium: Estádio Marcolino de Castro; Attendance: 1,270; Referee: Nuno Almeida
	Penalties
	Cris (penalty scored); Ícaro (penalty scored); Platiny (penalty scored); Erivaldo (penalty scored); Porcellis (penalty missed)		(penalty scored) Tengarrinha; (penalty scored) Luisinho; (penalty missed) R. Santos; (penalty scored) Inkoom; (penalty missed) Figueiredo

21 October 2015	Moreirense	1–0	Vitória de Setúbal	Moreira de Cónegos
16:00 WEST (UTC+01:00)	Martins 90'	Report		Stadium: Parque de Jogos Comendador Joaquim de Almeida Freitas; Attendance: 518; Referee: Tiago Antunes

== Third round ==
In the third round, the 12 second-round winners joined the four top-ranked teams from the 2014–15 Primeira Liga: Benfica (1st), Porto (2nd), Sporting CP (3rd) and Braga (4th). These 16 teams were drawn into four groups of four, each group containing one of the four top-ranked Primeira Liga teams. Group matches are played in a single round-robin format, ensuring that each team plays at least one match at home. The draw took place on 28 October 2015, 12:00 WET, and matches were played on 15 November, 28–30 December 2015, 19–20 January and 26–27 January 2016.

=== Group A ===
Pos	Team	Pld	W	D	L	GF	GA	GD	Pts	Qualification
1	Marítimo	3	2	1	0	7	3	+4	7	Advance to knockout phase
2	Feirense	3	2	0	1	5	4	+1	6	
3	Famalicão	3	1	1	1	1	1	0	4	
4	Porto	3	0	0	3	1	6	−5	0	

Source: LPFP
Rules for classification: Tiebreakers

15 November 2015	Feirense	2–4	Marítimo	Santa Maria da Feira
17:30 WET (UTC±00:00)	Ícaro 20'; Porcellis 77'	Report	Fransérgio 18'; Rodrigues 24', 45' (pen.); Dirceu 79'	Stadium: Estádio Marcolino de Castro; Attendance: 836; Referee: Jorge Sousa

29 December 2015	Porto	1–3	Marítimo	Porto
18:00 WET (UTC±00:00)	Aboubakar 90+5'	Report	Fransérgio 48'; Soares 70'; Marega 90+3'	Stadium: Estádio do Dragão; Attendance: 31,219; Referee: Vasco Santos

30 December 2015	Famalicão	0–1	Feirense	Vila Nova de Famalicão
20:00 WET (UTC±00:00)		Report	Micael 50'	Stadium: Estádio Municipal 22 de Junho; Attendance: 650; Referee: Tiago Antunes

20 January 2016	Famalicão	1–0	Porto	Vila Nova de Famalicão
19:45 WET (UTC±00:00)	Alonso 58'	Report		Stadium: Estádio Municipal 22 de Junho; Attendance: 3,491; Referee: Luís Ferreira

27 January 2016	Feirense	2–0	Porto	Santa Maria da Feira
20:15 WET (UTC±00:00)	Castro 39' (pen.); Porcellis 81'	Report		Stadium: Estádio Marcolino de Castro; Attendance: 1,422; Referee: Cosme Machado

27 January 2016	Marítimo	0–0	Famalicão	Funchal, Madeira
20:15 WET (UTC±00:00)		Report		Stadium: Estádio dos Barreiros; Attendance: 3,072; Referee: Rui Oliveira

=== Group B ===
Pos	Team	Pld	W	D	L	GF	GA	GD	Pts	Qualification
1	Benfica	3	3	0	0	8	1	+7	9	Advance to knockout phase
2	Nacional	3	1	1	1	1	1	0	4	
3	Moreirense	3	1	1	1	5	8	−3	4	
4	Oriental	3	0	0	3	2	6	−4	0	

Source: LPFP
Rules for classification: Tiebreakers

29 December 2015	Oriental	2–4	Moreirense	Lisbon
15:00 WET (UTC±00:00)	T. Tavares 35'; Fernando 90+2'	Report	D. Tavares 6' (o.g.); Boateng 45+2'; Martins 86' (pen.), 90'	Stadium: Campo Eng. Carlos Salema; Attendance: 442; Referee: Bruno Paixão

29 December 2015	Benfica	1–0	Nacional	Lisbon
19:45 WET (UTC±00:00)	Jiménez 90'	Report		Stadium: Estádio da Luz; Attendance: 20,107; Referee: João Capela

19 January 2016	Oriental	0–1	Benfica	Lisbon
15:00 WET (UTC±00:00)		Report	Talisca 74'	Stadium: Campo Eng. Carlos Salema; Attendance: 3,409; Referee: Tiago Antunes

20 January 2016	Moreirense	0–0	Nacional	Moreira de Cónegos
15:00 WET (UTC±00:00)		Report		Stadium: Parque de Jogos Comendador Joaquim de Almeida Freitas; Attendance: 514; Referee: Jorge Ferreira

26 January 2016	Nacional	1–0	Oriental	Funchal, Madeira
16:00 WET (UTC±00:00)	Agra 90+4'	Report		Stadium: Estádio da Madeira; Attendance: 127; Referee: Luís Godinho

26 January 2016	Moreirense	1–6	Benfica	Moreira de Cónegos
20:30 WET (UTC±00:00)	Medeiros 25'	Report	Talisca 12' (pen.), 14', 83'; Gaitán 20', 90'; Jiménez 30'	Stadium: Parque de Jogos Comendador Joaquim de Almeida Freitas; Attendance: 4,206; Referee: Sérgio Piscarreta

=== Group C ===
Pos	Team	Pld	W	D	L	GF	GA	GD	Pts	Qualification
1	Portimonense	3	3	0	0	9	3	+6	9	Advance to knockout phase
2	Sporting CP	3	2	0	1	4	3	+1	6	
3	Paços de Ferreira	3	0	1	2	4	7	−3	1	
4	Arouca	3	0	1	2	2	6	−4	1	

Source: LPFP
Rules for classification: Tiebreakers

28 December 2015	Portimonense	4–1	Arouca	Portimão
18:00 WET (UTC±00:00)	Carvalhas 16' (pen.), 47', 57' (pen.); Nelsinho 39' (o.g.)	Report	Roberto 35'	Stadium: Estádio Municipal de Portimão; Attendance: 895; Referee: Luís Ferreira

29 December 2015	Sporting CP	3–1	Paços de Ferreira	Lisbon
20:00 WET (UTC±00:00)	Aquilani 8'; G. Martins 52'; Ruiz 72'	Report	Christian 45+2'	Stadium: Estádio José Alvalade; Attendance: 23,462; Referee: Manuel Mota

19 January 2016	Portimonense	2–0	Sporting CP	Portimão
19:45 WET (UTC±00:00)	Ewerton 36', 90+2' (pen.)	Report		Stadium: Estádio Municipal de Portimão; Attendance: 4,673; Referee: Manuel Oliveira

20 January 2016	Arouca	1–1	Paços de Ferreira	Arouca
16:00 WET (UTC±00:00)	Mateus 57'	Report	J. Silva 54'	Stadium: Estádio Municipal de Arouca; Attendance: 314; Referee: Tiago Martins

26 January 2016	Arouca	0–1	Sporting CP	Arouca
18:30 WET (UTC±00:00)		Report	Zeegelaar 81'	Stadium: Estádio Municipal de Arouca; Attendance: 956; Referee: Fábio Veríssimo

26 January 2016	Paços de Ferreira	2–3	Portimonense	Paços de Ferreira
18:30 WET (UTC±00:00)	Costa 6'; Manuel José 27'	Report	Fidélis 44'; Cícero 71' (o.g.); Fabrício 74'	Stadium: Estádio Capital do Móvel; Attendance: 419; Referee: Bruno Esteves

=== Group D ===
Pos	Team	Pld	W	D	L	GF	GA	GD	Pts	Qualification
1	Braga	3	2	1	0	6	1	+5	7	Advance to knockout phase
2	Rio Ave	3	1	2	0	3	2	+1	5	
3	Belenenses	3	1	1	1	6	3	+3	4	
4	Leixões	3	0	0	3	1	10	−9	0	

Source: LPFP
Rules for classification: Tiebreakers

28 December 2015	Braga	2–1	Belenenses	Braga
20:00 WET (UTC±00:00)	Pedro Santos 13'; Fonte 31'	Report	Caeiro 89'	Stadium: Estádio Municipal de Braga; Attendance: 4,863; Referee: Jorge Ferreira

29 December 2015	Leixões	1–2	Rio Ave	Matosinhos
15:00 WET (UTC±00:00)	Nunes 90+2'	Report	Kayembe 4'; Tarantini 38'	Stadium: Estádio do Mar; Attendance: 1,010; Referee: Rui Oliveira

20 January 2016	Leixões	0–4	Braga	Matosinhos
15:00 WET (UTC±00:00)		Report	Pedro Santos 10'; Hassan 53'; Fonte 84'; Eduardo 90+2' (pen.)	Stadium: Estádio do Mar; Attendance: 932; Referee: João Pinheiro

20 January 2016	Rio Ave	1–1	Belenenses	Vila do Conde
20:00 WET (UTC±00:00)	Krovinović 58'	Report	Silva 79'	Stadium: Estádio do Rio Ave FC; Attendance: 1,613; Referee: Artur Soares Dias

27 January 2016	Belenenses	4–0	Leixões	Lisbon
16:00 WET (UTC±00:00)	Tonel 9'; Betinho 69'; Juanto 78', 86'	Report		Stadium: Estádio do Restelo; Attendance: 584; Referee: André Moreira

27 January 2016	Rio Ave	0–0	Braga	Vila do Conde
18:15 WET (UTC±00:00)		Report		Stadium: Estádio do Rio Ave FC; Attendance: 2,493; Referee: João Capela

== Knockout phase ==
In the knockout phase, the four teams advancing from the third round contested one-legged semi-final matches for a place in the competition final. The winners of Groups A and B host the winners of Groups C and D, respectively. The semi-finals were played on 10 February and 2 May, and the final was played on 20 May at Estádio Cidade de Coimbra, in Coimbra.

Semi-finals
10 February – Estádio dos Barreiros
Marítimo	3
Portimonense	1
2 May – Estádio da Luz
Benfica	2
Braga	1

Final
20 May – Estádio Cidade de Coimbra
Marítimo	2
Benfica	6

=== Semi-finals ===
10 February 2016
17:45 WET (UTC±00:00)

Marítimo	3–1	Portimonense
Costa 17'; Bessa 31'; Diawara 90+4'	Report	Pires 4'

Estádio dos Barreiros, Funchal, Madeira
Attendance: 5,237
Referee: João Capela

2 May 2016
19:45 WEST (UTC+01:00)

Benfica	2–1	Braga
Jonas 58'; Jiménez 71'	Report	Silva 19'

Estádio da Luz, Lisbon
Attendance: 24,933
Referee: Tiago Martins

=== Final ===
20 May 2016
19:45 WEST (UTC+01:00)

Marítimo	2–6	Benfica
João Diogo 45+1'; Fransérgio 83' (pen.)	Report	Jonas 11'; Mitroglou 18', 38'; Gaitán 77'; Jardel 90+1'; Jiménez 90+3' (pen.)

Estádio Cidade de Coimbra, Coimbra
Attendance: 28,878
Referee: Fábio Veríssimo (Leiria)
