= Benvindo Moreno =

Bissau-Guinean footballer

Personal information
- Full name: Benvindo António dos Santos Moreno
- Date of birth: 10 November 1989 (age 36)
- Place of birth: Bissau, Guinea-Bissau
- Height: 1.76 m (5 ft 9 in)
- Position: Midfielder

Youth career
- 2005–2008: Boavista

Senior career*
Years	Team	Apps	(Gls)
2008–2009	Boavista	8	(0)
2009–2011	Desportivo das Aves	5	(0)
2010	→ Tirsense (loan)		
2010–2011	→ Chaves (loan)		
2011–2012	Padroense	18	(1)
2012–2013	Tondela	5	(1)
2013	AD Oliveirense		
2014	Tirsense	7	(1)
2014–2015	Lusitânia Lourosa	15	(0)
2015	Cesarense	4	(0)
2015–2016	Gondomar	17	(0)
2017	Mirandela	9	(1)
2017–2018	Leça	15	(1)
2018	Oliveira do Douro	14	(1)
- * Club domestic league appearances and goals as of 2 April 2017

Benvindo António dos Santos Moreno (born 10 November 1989) is a Bissau-Guinean footballer who plays as a midfielder.

== Career ==
Moreno made his professional debut in the Segunda Liga for Boavista on 24 August 2008 in a game against Vizela.
