= Diogo Pereira (Portuguese footballer) =

Portuguese footballer

Personal information
- Full name: Diogo João Nogueira Pereira
- Date of birth: 18 December 1995 (age 30)
- Place of birth: Matosinhos, Portugal
- Height: 1.75 m (5 ft 9 in)
- Position: Midfielder

Team information
- Current team: Leça
- Number: 33

Youth career
- 2004–2006: Boavista
- 2006–2007: Pasteleira
- 2007–2008: Boavista
- 2008–2009: Pasteleira
- 2009–2013: Boavista
- 2013–2014: Rio Ave

Senior career*
Years	Team	Apps	(Gls)
2014	AD Oliveirense	0	(0)
2014–2015	Cerveira	21	(0)
2015–2019	Cesarense	121	(16)
2019–2020	Anadia	22	(1)
2020–2021	Académica de Coimbra	13	(0)
2021–2023	São João de Ver	51	(7)
2023–2025	Lusitânia	59	(2)
2025–2026	Oliveirense	29	(0)
2026–	Leça	5	(0)
- * Club domestic league appearances and goals as of 12 September 2026

Diogo João Nogueira Pereira (born 18 December 1995) is a Portuguese footballer who plays for Liga 3 club Leça as a midfielder.

== Football career ==
He made his professional debut for Académica on 20 September 2020 in the Liga Portugal 2.
