= Rodrigo Ferreira =

Rodrigo Ferreira may refer to:

- Rodrigo Ferreira (footballer, born 1995), a Brazilian footballer
- Rodrigo Ferreira (footballer, born 2001), a Portuguese footballer
