= Edu Pinheiro =

Portuguese footballer

Personal information
- Full name: Eduardo Almeida Pinheiro
- Date of birth: 8 November 1997 (age 29)
- Place of birth: São João da Madeira, Portugal
- Height: 1.90 m (6 ft 3 in)
- Position: Midfielder

Team information
- Current team: Sanjoanense
- Number: 13

Youth career
- 2005–2007: Sanjoanense
- 2007–2008: Sporting
- 2008–2011: FC Porto
- 2011–2015: Sanjoanense
- 2015–2016: Paços de Ferreira

Senior career*
| Years | Team | Apps | (Gls) |
| 2016 | Paços de Ferreira | 1 | (0) |
| 2016–2022 | Sporting CP B | 61 | (1) |
| 2018–2019 | → Cesarense (loan) | 7 | (0) |
| 2019 | → Sintrense (loan) | 13 | (1) |
| 2019–2020 | → Olhanense (loan) | 9 | (0) |
| 2022–2023 | Anadia | 23 | (0) |
| 2023–2025 | Penafiel | 28 | (0) |
| 2025– | Sanjoanense | 25 | (3) |
- * Club domestic league appearances and goals as of 7 May 2026

Eduardo Almeida Pinheiro (born 8 November 1997) known simply as Edu Pinheiro, is a Portuguese professional footballer who plays as a midfielder for Liga 3 club Sanjoanense. His foot preference for playing ball is the right foot.

== Career ==
On 3 April 2016, Pinheiro made his professional debut with Paços Ferreira in a 2015–16 Primeira Liga match against Estoril Praia.
