= S.C. Vila Real =

Portuguese football club

Vila Real
- Full name: Sport Clube Vila Real
- Founded: 1920; 106 years ago
- Ground: Complexo Desportivo Monte Da Forca; Vila Real; Portugal
- Capacity: 5,000
- Chairman: Francisco Carvalho
- Head Coach: Fernando Pereira
- League: Champions league Liga Bwin
- 2018–19: Vila Real FA Divisão de Honra (promoted)
- Website: www.scvilareal.tk
Home colours

Sport Clube Vila Real (abbreviated as SC Vila Real) is a Portuguese football club based in Vila Real in the district of Vila Real.

== Background ==
SC Vila Real currently plays in the Terceira Divisão Série B which is the fourth tier of Portuguese football. The club was founded in 1920 and they play their home matches at the Complexo Desportivo Monte Da Forca in Vila Real. The stadium is able to accommodate 5,000 spectators.

The closest they ever came to play in Primeira Divisão/Liga was in 1944, when they won the Segunda Divisão Norte regional division but lost the Segunda Divisão Grand Final 2–3 to Estoril. Vila Real never again would compete for a top flight place, yo-yoing between Segunda and Terceira Divisão until 1978 when they were relegated from Segunda for the last time.

The club is affiliated to Associação de Futebol de Vila Real and has competed in the AF Vila Real Taça. The club has also entered the national cup competition known as Taça de Portugal on numerous occasions.

== Appearances ==
- II Divisão B: 35

== Season to season ==
| Season | Level | Division | Section | Place | Movements |
|---|---|---|---|---|---|
| 1990–91 | Tier 3 | Segunda Divisão | Série Norte | 6th | |
| 1991–92 | Tier 3 | Segunda Divisão | Série Norte | 7th | |
| 1992–93 | Tier 3 | Segunda Divisão | Série Norte | 5th | |
| 1993–94 | Tier 3 | Segunda Divisão | Série Norte | 15th | Relegated |
| 1994–95 | Tier 4 | Terceira Divisão | Série B | 2nd | Promoted |
| 1995–96 | Tier 3 | Segunda Divisão | Série Norte | 5th | |
| 1996–97 | Tier 3 | Segunda Divisão | Série Norte | 6th | |
| 1997–98 | Tier 3 | Segunda Divisão | Série Norte | 2nd | |
| 1998–99 | Tier 3 | Segunda Divisão | Série Norte | 16th | Relegated |
| 1999–2000 | Tier 4 | Terceira Divisão | Série B | 8th | |
| 2000–01 | Tier 4 | Terceira Divisão | Série B | 1st | Promoted |
| 2001–02 | Tier 3 | Segunda Divisão | Série Norte | 16th | |
| 2002–03 | Tier 3 | Segunda Divisão | Série Norte | 17th | Relegated |
| 2003–04 | Tier 4 | Terceira Divisão | Série B | 7th | |
| 2004–05 | Tier 4 | Terceira Divisão | Série B | 12th | |
| 2005–06 | Tier 4 | Terceira Divisão | Série B | 10th | |
| 2006–07 | Tier 4 | Terceira Divisão | Série B | 14th | Relegated |
| 2007–08 | Tier 5 | Distritais | AF Vila Real – Honra | 1st | Promoted |
| 2008–09 | Tier 4 | Terceira Divisão | Série B – 1ª Fase | 11th | Relegation Group |
| | Tier 4 | Terceira Divisão | Série B – Sub-Série B1 | 3rd | Relegated |
| 2009–10 | Tier 5 | Distritais | AF Vila Real – Honra | 2nd | |
| 2010–11 | Tier 5 | Distritais | AF Vila Real – Honra | 1st | Promoted |
| 2011–12 | Tier 4 | Terceira Divisão | Série B – 1ª Fase | 5th | Promotion Group |
| | Tier 4 | Terceira Divisão | Série B Fase Final | 5th | |

== League history ==
| | I | II | III | IV | V | Pts. | Pl. | W | L | T | GS | GA | Diff. |
|---|---|---|---|---|---|---|---|---|---|---|---|---|---|
| 1934–35 | | 2 | | | | 8 pts | 6 | 4 | 0 | 2 | 10 | 8 | +2 |
| 1935–36 | | 2 | | | | 10 pts | 6 | 5 | 0 | 1 | 28 | 11 | +17 |
| 1936–37 | | 1 | | | | 6 pts | 3 | 3 | 0 | 0 | 24 | 4 | +20 |
| 1937–38 | | 1 | | | | 4 pts | 2 | 2 | 0 | 0 | 12 | 1 | +11 |
| 1938–39 | | 1 | | | | 2 pts | 1 | 1 | 0 | 0 | 3 | 0 | +3 |
| 1941–42 | | 1 | | | | 14 pts | 8 | 7 | 0 | 1 | 49 | 12 | +37 |
| 1942–43 | | 2 | | | | 14 pts | 8 | 7 | 0 | 1 | 42 | 13 | +29 |
| 1943–44 | | 2 | | | | 16 pts | 12 | 7 | 2 | 3 | 39 | 25 | +14 |
| 1944–45 | | 3 | | | | 3 pts | 4 | 1 | 1 | 2 | 12 | 16 | −4 |
| 1945–46 | | 4 | | | | 10 pts | 10 | 4 | 2 | 4 | 45 | 31 | +14 |
| 1946–47 | | 1 | | | | 16 pts | 10 | 8 | 0 | 2 | 65 | 14 | +51 |
| 1947–48 | | 3 | | | | 18 pts | 14 | 9 | 0 | 5 | 50 | 35 | +15 |
| 1948–49 | | 6 | | | | 11 pts | 14 | 4 | 3 | 7 | 22 | 29 | −7 |
| 1949–50 | | 3 | | | | 4 pts | 6 | 2 | 0 | 4 | 8 | 15 | −7 |
| 1950–51 | | 4 | | | | 20 pts | 18 | 7 | 6 | 5 | 36 | 20 | +16 |
| 1951–52 | | 3 | | | | 6 pts | 6 | 3 | 0 | 3 | 13 | 15 | −2 |
| 1952–53 | | | 1 | | | 17 pts | 10 | 8 | 1 | 1 | 41 | 10 | +31 |
| 1953–54 | | 10 | | | | 24 pts | 26 | 9 | 6 | 11 | 41 | 42 | −1 |
| 1954–55 | | | 2 | | | 16 pts | 10 | - | - | - | 44 | 12 | +32 |
| 1955–56 | | | 1 | | | 16 pts | 10 | - | - | - | 32 | 13 | +19 |
| 1956–57 | | | 1 | | | 16 pts | 10 | - | - | - | 31 | 11 | +20 |
| 1957–58 | | 11 | | | | 21 pts | 26 | 7 | 7 | 12 | 32 | 43 | −9 |
| 1958–59 | | 8 | | | | 25 pts | 26 | 10 | 5 | 11 | 37 | 42 | −5 |
| 1959–60 | | 12 | | | | 22 pts | 26 | 8 | 6 | 12 | 51 | 54 | −3 |
| 1960–61 | | | 1 | | | 9 pts | 6 | 3 | 3 | 0 | 10 | 5 | +5 |
| 1961–62 | | 13 | | | | 19 pts | 26 | 9 | 1 | 16 | 36 | 41 | −5 |
| 1962–63 | | | 5 | | | 8 pts | 10 | 4 | 0 | 6 | 23 | 20 | +3 |
| 1963–64 | | | 1 | | | 15 pts | 10 | 7 | 1 | 2 | 42 | 14 | +28 |
| 1964–65 | | 14 | | | | 10 pts | 26 | 3 | 4 | 19 | 25 | 89 | −64 |
| 1965–66 | | | 4 | | | 9 pts | 10 | 4 | 1 | 5 | 16 | 22 | −6 |
| 1966–67 | | | 2 | | | 15 pts | 10 | 6 | 3 | 1 | 23 | 9 | +14 |
| 1967–68 | | | 3 | | | 13 pts | 10 | 6 | 1 | 3 | 20 | 13 | +7 |
| 1968–69 | | | 6 | | | 23 pts | 22 | 9 | 5 | 8 | 41 | 32 | +9 |
| 1969–70 | | | 11 | | | 26 pts | 30 | 10 | 6 | 14 | 38 | 42 | −4 |
| 1970–71 | | | 10 | | | 27 pts | 30 | 11 | 5 | 14 | 48 | 42 | +6 |
| 1971–72 | | | 9 | | | 29 pts | 30 | 11 | 7 | 12 | 33 | 35 | −2 |
| 1972–73 | | | 7 | | | 33 pts | 30 | 14 | 5 | 11 | 39 | 27 | +12 |
| 1973–74 | | | 5 | | | 43 pts | 36 | 17 | 9 | 10 | 49 | 38 | +9 |
| 1974–75 | | | 14 | | | 35 pts | 38 | 12 | 11 | 15 | 37 | 48 | −11 |
| 1975–76 | | | 2 | | | 55 pts | 38 | 25 | 5 | 8 | - | - | - |
| 1976–77 | | 12 | | | | 28 pts | 30 | 10 | 8 | 12 | 30 | 37 | −7 |
| 1977–78 | | 16 | | | | 18 pts | 30 | 6 | 6 | 18 | 24 | 52 | −28 |
| 1978–79 | | | 4 | | | 39 pts | 29 | 15 | 9 | 5 | 46 | 20 | +26 |
| 1979–80 | | | 7 | | | 35 pts | 30 | 13 | 9 | 8 | 41 | 23 | +18 |
| 1980–81 | | | 14 | | | 26 pts | 30 | 10 | 6 | 14 | 40 | 46 | −6 |
| 1982–83 | | | 15 | | | 23 pts | 30 | 9 | 5 | 16 | 26 | 47 | −21 |
| 1985–86 | | | 6 | | | 30 pts | 30 | 11 | 8 | 11 | 35 | 35 | 0 |
| 1986–87 | | | 9 | | | 31 pts | 30 | 11 | 9 | 10 | 39 | 35 | +4 |
| 1987–88 | | | 4 | | | 47 pts | 38 | 20 | 7 | 11 | 69 | 34 | +35 |
| 1988–89 | | | 3 | | | 44 pts | 34 | 17 | 10 | 7 | 54 | 26 | +28 |
| 1989–90 | | | 2 | | | 46 pts | 34 | 19 | 8 | 7 | 58 | 33 | +25 |
| 1990–91 | | | 6 | | | 42 pts | 38 | 17 | 8 | 13 | 52 | 39 | +13 |
| 1991–92 | | | 7 | | | 35 pts | 34 | 12 | 11 | 11 | 45 | 40 | +5 |
| 1992–93 | | | 5 | | | 35 pts | 32 | 14 | 7 | 11 | 42 | 35 | +7 |
| 1993–94 | | | 15 | | | 29 pts | 34 | 10 | 9 | 15 | 31 | 34 | −3 |
| 1994–95 | | | | 2 | | 47 pts | 34 | 18 | 11 | 5 | 49 | 21 | +28 |
| 1995–96 | | | 6 | | | 53 pts | 34 | 15 | 8 | 11 | 45 | 34 | +9 |
| 1996–97 | | | 6 | | | 48 pts | 34 | 12 | 12 | 10 | 40 | 30 | +10 |
| 1997–98 | | | 2 | | | 65 pts | 34 | 19 | 8 | 7 | 74 | 51 | +23 |
| 1998–99 | | | 16 | | | 35 pts | 34 | 10 | 5 | 19 | 27 | 40 | −13 |
| 1999–2000 | | | | 8 | | 51 pts | 34 | 15 | 6 | 13 | 55 | 45 | +10 |
| 2000–01 | | | | 1 | | 72 pts | 34 | 22 | 6 | 6 | 60 | 35 | +25 |
| 2001–02 | | | 16 | | | 45 pts | 38 | 12 | 9 | 17 | 58 | 61 | −3 |
| 2002–03 | | | 17 | | | 40 pts | 38 | 10 | 10 | 18 | 54 | 62 | −5 |
| 2003–04 | | | | 8 | | 51 pts | 34 | 14 | 9 | 11 | 35 | 33 | +2 |
| 2004–05 | | | | 12 | | 44 pts | 34 | 12 | 8 | 14 | 41 | 44 | −3 |
| 2005–06 | | | | 7 | | 48 pts | 32 | 13 | 9 | 10 | 43 | 32 | +9 |
| 2006–07 | | | | 14 | | 31 pts | 30 | 7 | 10 | 13 | 20 | 32 | −12 |
| 2007–08 | | | | | 1 | 78 pts | 30 | 24 | 6 | 0 | 62 | 12 | +50 |
| 2008–09 | | | | 11 | | 24 pts | 24 | 6 | 6 | 12 | 30 | 40 | −10 |
| 2009–10 | | | | | 2 | ... | ... | ... | ... | ... | ... | ... | ... |
| 2010–11 | | | | | 1 | ... | ... | ... | ... | ... | ... | ... | ... |
| 2011–12 | | | | 5 | | ... | ... | ... | ... | ... | ... | ... | ... |

== Honours ==
- Terceira Divisão: 1952–53, 2000–01
- Campeonato de Vila Real: 1924–25, 1925–26, 1926–27, 1927–28, 1928–29, 1929–30, 1930–31, 1931–32, 1932–33, 1933–34, 1934–35, 1935–36, 1936–37, 1937–38, 1938–39, 1939–40, 1940–41, 1941–42, 1942–43, 1943–44, 1944–45, 1945–46, 1946–47
- AF Vila Real Divisão de Honra: 2007–08, 2010–11, 2013–14

== Current squad ==
Updated 24 December 2021

Note: Flags indicate national team as defined under FIFA eligibility rules; some limited exceptions apply. Players may hold more than one non-FIFA nationality.

| No. | Pos. | Nation | Player |
|---|---|---|---|
| 1 | GK | POR | Nuno Silva |
| 3 | DF | POR | Fred Coelho |
| 4 | DF | BRA | Iago |
| 5 | MF | POR | Pedro Silva |
| 6 | MF | UKR | Serhiy Syzyi |
| 7 | FW | POR | Miguel Dias |
| 9 | FW | GNB | Ivanildo Nhaga |
| 10 | FW | POR | Paulo Rodrigues |
| 11 | MF | BRA | Bruno Furtado |
| 12 | GK | POR | Daniel Clemente |
| 13 | DF | POR | Gonçalo Paixão |

| No. | Pos. | Nation | Player |
|---|---|---|---|
| 17 | FW | POR | André Fontes |
| 18 | FW | POR | André Azevedo |
| 19 | GK | POR | Daniel Júnior |
| 21 | MF | POR | Zé Pedro |
| 23 | DF | POR | Miguel Carreira |
| 24 | MF | CMR | Jahfort Gueyap |
| 27 | DF | BRA | Davi |
| 30 | FW | POR | Iuri Gomes |
| 54 | DF | POR | Baltazar Paisana |
| 55 | MF | POR | Simão Ferreira |
| 99 | DF | BRA | Gustavo |

== Notable former managers ==
- (Portugal) Manuel Machado
- (Spain) Uni Emery
