= Henrique Gomes =

Henrique Gomes may refer to:

- Henrique Gomes (footballer, born 1991), Portuguese footballer
- Henrique Gomes (footballer, born 1995), Portuguese footballer
