= Rui Silva (footballer, born 1996) =

Portuguese footballer

Personal information
- Full name: Rui Pedro Oliveira da Silva
- Date of birth: 5 June 1996 (age 30)
- Place of birth: Lourosa, Portugal
- Height: 1.76 m (5 ft 9 in)
- Position: Right-back

Team information
- Current team: Sanjoanense
- Number: 19

Youth career
- 2004–2007: Lusitânia
- 2007–2015: Porto
- 2011–2012: → Padroense (loan)

Senior career*
Years	Team	Apps	(Gls)
2015–2017	Santa Clara	50	(1)
2017–2019	Braga B	12	(0)
2018–2019	→ Santa Clara (loan)	2	(0)
2019–2020	Leixões	12	(0)
2020	Académico Viseu	7	(0)
2020–2021	Varzim	10	(0)
2021	Lusitânia	8	(0)
2021–2023	Torreense	34	(0)
2023–2024	Alverca	20	(0)
2024–2025	Anadia	15	(0)
2025	1º Dezembro	11	(1)
2025–2026	União Santarém	11	(0)
2026	Caldas	5	(0)
2026–	Sanjoanense	4	(0)

International career
2013	Portugal U17	1	(0)
2014	Portugal U18	1	(0)
2016	Portugal U20	3	(0)
- * Club domestic league appearances and goals as of 13 September 2026

Rui Pedro Oliveira da Silva (born 5 June 1996) is a Portuguese professional footballer who plays as a right-back for Campeonato de Portugal club Sanjoanense.

== Club career ==
Born in Lourosa (Santa Maria da Feira), Silva began his youth career at Lusitânia F.C. in his village before eight full years in the ranks of FC Porto. In 2015 he moved to C.D. Santa Clara, where on 2 August he made his professional debut against Atlético Clube de Portugal in the second round of the Taça da Liga; he played the entirety of the 1–1 home draw, before a 6–5 penalty shootout defeat.

On 23 January 2016, Silva was sent off in the first half-hour of a goalless LigaPro draw against U.D. Oliveirense also at the Estádio de São Miguel. He scored his only goal for the club on 20 March in a 2–2 home draw with Clube Oriental de Lisboa.

In June 2017, Silva transferred to S.C. Braga on a three-year contract with the option of three more, being assigned to the reserve team. A year later, he was loaned for a year back to Santa Clara, now in the Primeira Liga. He played only two top-flight games, the first as a substitute in a 2–1 home loss to Sporting CP on 4 November 2018.

Silva returned to the Porto metropolitan area on 7 June 2019, when he signed for Leixões S.C. on a two-year deal. Six months later, he moved across the second division to Académico de Viseu F.C. for the rest of the season.

On 3 June 2020, Silva joined Varzim S.C. still in the second tier. Seven months later, he dropped down a level to return to Lusitânia, before making his way in July 2021 to S.C.U. Torreense in the new Liga 3.

Silva remained in division three subsequently, with F.C. Alverca, Anadia FC, S.U. 1º Dezembro and União de Santarém.
