= Faty =

Faty is both a given name and a surname. Notable people with the name include:

- Faty Papy (1990–2019), Burundian footballer
- Alioune Badara Faty (born 1999), Senegalese footballer
- Ansumane Faty (born 1991), Guinea-Bissauan footballer
- Jacques Faty (born 1984), French footballer
- Ricardo Faty (born 1986), French footballer
- Thierno Faty Sow (1941–2009), Senegalese filmmaker
