= Mika (footballer, born 1987) =

Portuguese footballer

Personal information
- Full name: Michael da Conceição Figueiredo
- Date of birth: 26 September 1987 (age 39)
- Place of birth: Lyon, France
- Height: 1.80 m (5 ft 11 in)
- Position: Centre-back

Team information
- Current team: Leça (manager)

Youth career
- 2002–2006: Feirense

Senior career*
Years	Team	Apps	(Gls)
2006–2012	Feirense	41	(0)
2007–2008	→ Fiães (loan)	10	(1)
2012–2014	Arouca	49	(3)
2014–2016	Feirense	21	(1)
2016–2017	Trofense	12	(0)
2017	Freamunde	13	(0)
2017–2021	Trofense	107	(8)
2021–2023	Lusitânia	26	(0)
2023–2025	Leça	22	(0)
Total		301	(13)
- * Club domestic league appearances and goals

Michael da Conceição Figueiredo (born 26 September 1987 in Lyon, France), known as Mika, is a Portuguese former professional footballer who played as a central defender.
