= João Gradíssimo =

Portuguese footballer

Personal information
- Full name: João Carlos Moura Gradíssimo
- Date of birth: 18 May 1992 (age 34)
- Place of birth: Porto, Portugal
- Height: 1.78 m (5 ft 10 in)
- Position: Midfielder

Youth career
- 2001–2005: Salgueiros
- 2005–2007: Porto
- 2007–2008: Padroense
- 2008–2009: Porto
- 2009–2010: Leixões
- 2010–2011: Académica

Senior career*
Years	Team	Apps	(Gls)
2011–2012	Vila Meã	7	(0)
2013–2014	Mirandela	22	(8)
2014–2015	Salgueiros 08	21	(4)
2015–2016	Académico Viseu	15	(0)
- * Club domestic league appearances and goals as of 31 May 2016

João Carlos Moura Gradíssimo (born 18 May 1992) is a Portuguese former footballer who played as a midfielder.

== Football career ==
On 2 August 2015, Gradíssimo made his professional debut with Académico Viseu in a 2015–16 Taça da Liga match against Gil Vicente.
