= Andrezinho (footballer, born 1995) =

Portuguese footballer

Personal information
- Full name: André Filipe Carneiro Leal
- Date of birth: 6 August 1995 (age 31)
- Place of birth: Paredes, Portugal
- Height: 1.74 m (5 ft 8 1/2 in)
- Position: Attacking midfielder

Team information
- Current team: Sanjoanense
- Number: 20

Youth career
- 2003–2012: Paredes
- 2012: Rio Ave
- 2012–2014: Paços Ferreira

Senior career*
Years	Team	Apps	(Gls)
2014–2018	Paços Ferreira	69	(5)
2019	Estoril	2	(0)
2019–2020	Spartak Subotica	10	(0)
2020–2021	União Leiria	26	(3)
2021–2023	Trofense	31	(2)
2023–2024	Anadia	26	(3)
2024–2025	São João Ver	22	(1)
2025–2026	Marco 09	14	(2)
2026–	Sanjoanense	8	(1)
- * Club domestic league appearances and goals as of 7 May 2026

André Filipe Carneiro Leal (born 6 August 1995), known as Andrezinho, is a Portuguese professional footballer who plays as an attacking midfielder for Liga 3 club Sanjoanense.

== Club career ==
Born in Paredes, Porto District, Andrezinho finished his youth career at F.C. Paços de Ferreira. He made his Primeira Liga debut for the club on 26 April 2015, playing 75 minutes in the 3–1 away win against F.C. Arouca; it was one of just five appearances during the season.

Andrezinho scored his first goal in the top division on 12 December 2015, in a 6–0 home rout of C.F. União. He played 15 matches (only two as a starter) during the 2017–18 campaign, which ended in relegation to the LigaPro.

On 11 January 2019, Andrezinho signed a one-and-a-half-year contract with second-tier side G.D. Estoril Praia. In August, however, he moved to FK Spartak Subotica of the Serbian SuperLiga on a two-year deal.
