= 1992–93 Segunda Divisão B =

Segunda Divisão
- Season: 1992–93
- Champions: Leça FC
- Promoted: Académico Viseu; Leça FC; Portimonense SC
- Relegated: 11 teams

The 1992–93 Segunda Divisão season was the 59th season of the competition and the 46th season of recognised third-tier football in Portugal.

== Overview ==
The league was contested by 53 teams in 3 divisions with Académico Viseu, Leça FC and Portimonense SC winning the respective divisional competitions and gaining promotion to the Liga de Honra. The overall championship was won by Leça FC.

== League standings ==
=== Segunda Divisão - Zona Norte ===
Pos	Team	Pld	W	D	L	GF	GA	GD	Pts	Promotion or relegation
1	Leça FC	32	18	8	6	35	21	+14	44	Promotion to Liga de Honra
2	FC Vizela	32	15	8	9	49	35	+14	38	
3	AD Fafe	32	12	12	8	43	27	+16	36	
4	FC Maia	32	15	6	11	43	29	+14	36	
5	SC Vila Real	32	14	7	11	42	35	+7	35	
6	FC Marco	32	13	8	11	41	29	+12	34	
7	AD Lousada	32	13	8	11	46	48	−2	34	
8	Moreirense FC	32	11	11	10	47	40	+7	33	
9	Infesta FC	32	13	6	13	63	63	0	32	
10	AD Esposende	32	10	11	11	32	34	−2	31	
11	Ermesinde SC	32	9	12	11	41	44	−3	30	
12	Varzim SC	32	9	11	12	20	29	−9	29	
13	União Paredes	32	10	9	13	34	50	−16	29	
14	Lusitânia Lourosa	32	11	6	15	33	41	−8	28	
15	CD Trofense	32	8	11	13	31	43	−12	27	Relegation to Terceira Divisão
16	SC Freamunde	32	8	10	14	32	41	−9	26	Relegation to Terceira Divisão
17	SC Vianense	32	6	10	16	24	47	−23	22	Relegation to Terceira Divisão

=== Segunda Divisão - Zona Centro ===
Pos	Team	Pld	W	D	L	GF	GA	GD	Pts	Promotion or relegation
1	Académico Viseu	34	21	8	5	54	25	+29	50	Promotion to Liga de Honra
2	Caldas SC	34	17	13	4	55	24	+31	47	
3	União Lamas	34	20	6	8	69	31	+38	46	
4	AD Sanjoanense	34	15	11	8	43	34	+9	41	
5	UD Oliveirense	34	14	12	8	60	43	+17	40	
6	RD Águeda	34	14	12	8	37	28	+9	40	
7	Oliveira do Hospital	34	13	11	10	40	34	+6	37	
8	CD Fátima	34	12	12	10	32	39	−7	36	
9	AD Guarda	34	12	11	11	44	39	+5	35	
10	CD Lousanense	34	12	10	12	33	30	+3	34	
11	GD Peniche	34	11	10	13	38	41	−3	32	
12	CD Torres Novas	34	9	14	11	36	38	−2	32	
13	AC Marinhense	34	9	14	11	36	37	−1	32	
14	GD Mealhada	34	9	12	13	38	55	−17	30	
15	UFCI Tomar	34	9	9	16	29	51	−22	27	Relegation to Terceira Divisão
16	AC Malveira	34	10	7	17	33	42	−9	27	Relegation to Terceira Divisão
17	União Mirense	34	2	11	21	30	68	−38	15	Relegation to Terceira Divisão
18	Anadia FC	34	2	7	25	25	73	−48	11	Relegation to Terceira Divisão

=== Segunda Divisão - Zona Sul ===
Pos	Team	Pld	W	D	L	GF	GA	GD	Pts	Promotion or relegation
1	Portimonense SC	34	20	11	3	62	27	+35	51	Promotion to Liga de Honra
2	CD Olivais e Moscavide	34	16	10	8	41	29	+12	42	
3	FC Barreirense	34	16	10	8	45	23	+22	42	
4	SL Fanhões	34	13	12	9	40	33	+7	38	
5	FC Alverca	34	12	14	8	36	33	+3	38	
6	CD Montijo	34	13	11	10	50	32	+18	37	
7	União Montemor	34	11	15	8	43	47	−4	37	
8	CDR Quarteirense	34	13	9	12	42	39	+3	35	
9	Juventude Évora	34	11	13	10	46	43	+3	35	
10	Atlético CP	34	12	10	12	38	39	−1	34	
11	SU Sintrense	34	10	14	10	37	35	+2	34	
12	SC Olhanense	34	10	13	11	37	42	−5	33	
13	O Elvas CAD	34	9	14	11	25	30	−5	32	
14	Esperança Lagos	34	11	9	14	37	39	−2	31	
15	Vasco da Gama AC Sines	34	11	8	15	33	36	−3	30	Relegation to Terceira Divisão
16	Lusitano VRSA	34	10	9	15	34	36	−2	29	Relegation to Terceira Divisão
17	Lusitano Évora	34	6	6	22	26	66	−40	18	Relegation to Terceira Divisão
18	União Santiago	34	4	8	22	29	74	−45	16	Relegation to Terceira Divisão
