= Vitinha (footballer, born 1999) =

Portuguese footballer (born 1999)

Personal information
- Full name: Vítor Hugo de Almeida Tavares
- Date of birth: 30 January 1999 (age 27)
- Place of birth: Vale de Cambra, Portugal
- Height: 1.70 m (5 ft 7 in)
- Position: Defender

Team information
- Current team: Sanjoanense
- Number: 12

Youth career
- 2007–2008: Macieira Cambra
- 2008–2009: Sanjoanense
- 2009–2012: Porto
- 2012–2013: Dragon Force
- 2013–2014: Porto
- 2014–2016: Sanjoanense
- 2016–2018: Paços Ferreira

Senior career*
Years	Team	Apps	(Gls)
2018–2019	Espinho	22	(0)
2019–2020	Lusitânia	24	(1)
2020–2022	Penafiel	23	(1)
2023	Amora	10	(1)
2023–2024	Académica de Coimbra	8	(0)
2024–	Sanjoanense	42	(4)
- * Club domestic league appearances and goals as of 7 May 2026

Vítor Hugo de Almeida Tavares (born 30 January 1999) known as Vitinha, is a Portuguese professional footballer who plays as a defender for Sanjoanense.

== Career ==
Vitinha made his professional debut for Penafiel on 14 September 2020 in the Liga Portugal 2.
