= Serhiy Syzyi =

Ukrainian footballer

Personal information
- Full name: Serhiy Oleksandrovych Syzyi
- Date of birth: 1 September 1995 (age 31)
- Place of birth: Kharkiv, Ukraine
- Height: 1.72 m (5 ft 7 1/2 in)
- Position: Midfielder

Team information
- Current team: Sanjoanense
- Number: 5

Youth career
- 2008–2010: FC Arsenal Kharkiv
- 2010–2012: UFK Kharkiv
- 2012–2014: FC Metalist Kharkiv

Senior career*
| Years | Team | Apps | (Gls) |
| 2014–2015 | FC Metalist Kharkiv | 1 | (0) |
| 2016 | Aves | 10 | (0) |
| 2016–2017 | Fafe | 6 | (0) |
| 2017– | Sanjoanense | 37 | (0) |

International career
| 2013–2014 | Ukraine U18 | 8 | (1) |
- * Club domestic league appearances and goals as of 00:33, 20 October 2019 (UTC)

Serhiy Syzyi (Ukrainian: Сергій Олександрович Сизий; born 1 September 1995 in Kharkiv, Ukraine) is a professional Ukrainian football midfielder who plays for Sanjoanense.

== Career ==
Syzyi is a product of the FC Arsenal Kharkiv and UFK Kharkiv School Systems.

He made his debut for FC Metalist in the match against FC Dynamo Kyiv on 1 March 2015 in the Ukrainian Premier League.
