= Rui Raínho =

Portuguese footballer

Personal information
- Full name: Rui Pedro Machado Bandeira Raínho
- Date of birth: 27 June 1989 (age 37)
- Place of birth: Aveiro, Portugal
- Height: 1.80 m (5 ft 11 in)
- Position: Left-back

Youth career
- 1997–2003: Beira-Mar
- 2003–2008: Boavista

Senior career*
Years	Team	Apps	(Gls)
2008–2010	Espinho	54	(2)
2010–2011	Madalena	30	(5)
2011–2012	Espinho	30	(3)
2012–2013	Chaves	12	(0)
2013–2017	Freamunde	153	(9)
2018	Cesarense	14	(0)
2018–2020	Anadia		

International career
2004	Portugal U16	2	(0)
2007–2008	Portugal U19	4	(0)
- * Club domestic league appearances and goals

Rui Pedro Machado Bandeira Raínho (born 27 June 1989) is a Portuguese former professional footballer who played as a left-back for Anadia F.C..

== Career ==
On 27 July 2014, Raínho made his professional debut with Freamunde in a 2014–15 Taça da Liga match against Covilhã.
