= Tiago Borges =

Portuguese footballer

Personal information
- Full name: Tiago Nuno Cordeiro Borges
- Date of birth: 6 June 1985 (age 41)
- Place of birth: Praia, Portugal
- Height: 1.78 m (5 ft 10 in)
- Position: Forward

Team information
- Current team: Anadia

Youth career
- 1995–1998: Marítimo Ponta Delgada
- 1998–1999: Lusitânia
- 1999–2004: Graciosa

Senior career*
Years	Team	Apps	(Gls)
2004–2006	Porto B	29	(3)
2006–2007	Marco	15	(3)
2007	Fiães	6	(0)
2007–2011	Anadia	96	(24)
2011–2013	Leixões	46	(9)
2011–2012	→ Fafe (loan)	22	(1)
2013–2014	Moreirense	21	(3)
2014–2017	Académico Viseu	108	(9)
2017	Salgueiros	12	(1)
2018	Sanjoanense	14	(2)
2018–2019	Mirandela	26	(2)
2019–	Anadia	6	(0)

International career
2005	Portugal U20	4	(1)
- * Club domestic league appearances and goals as of 14 December 2019

Tiago Nuno Cordeiro Borges (born 6 June 1985 in Praia (Santa Cruz da Graciosa), Azores) is a Portuguese footballer who plays for Anadia F.C. as a forward.
