= Godinho =

Portuguese footballer

Personal information
- Full name: Manuel Augusto Pinho Godinho
- Date of birth: 1 August 1985 (age 41)
- Place of birth: Oliveira de Azeméis, Portugal
- Height: 1.85 m (6 ft 1 in)
- Position: Midfielder

Team information
- Current team: Sanjoanense
- Number: 45

Youth career
- 1997–2003: Oliveirense

Senior career*
Years	Team	Apps	(Gls)
2003–2010	Oliveirense	135	(12)
2010–2012	Naval	25	(2)
2012–2013	Santa Clara	39	(3)
2013–2019	Oliveirense	151	(6)
2019–	Sanjoanense	0	(0)
- * Club domestic league appearances and goals as of 13:36, 29 July 2019 (UTC)

Manuel Augusto Pinho Godinho (born 1 August 1985), simply known as Godinho is a Portuguese professional footballer who plays for A.D. Sanjoanense as a midfielder.

== Career ==
=== Sanjoanense ===
On 3 July 2019 A.D. Sanjoanense announced, that Godinho had joined the club from UD Oliveirense.
