= Iago (footballer, born 1999) =

Brazilian footballer

Personal information
- Full name: Iago Fabrício Gonçalves dos Reis
- Date of birth: 2 November 1999 (age 27)
- Place of birth: Porteirinha, Minas Gerais, Brazil
- Height: 1.87 m (6 ft 2 in)
- Position: Centre-back

Team information
- Current team: Ferroviário

Youth career
- –2018: Palmeiras

Senior career*
| Years | Team | Apps | (Gls) |
| 2019 | Vitória Guimarães B | 1 | (0) |
| 2019–2020 | União Madeira | 15 | (0) |
| 2020–2021 | Oleiros | 12 | (0) |
| 2021–2022 | Vila Real | 18 | (0) |
| 2022–2025 | Oliveirense | 42 | (1) |
| 2025– | Ferroviário | 12 | (0) |
- * Club domestic league appearances and goals as of 27 July 2025

Iago Fabrício Gonçalves dos Reis (born 2 November 1999), commonly known as Iago, is a Brazilian professional footballer who plays as a centre-back for Ferroviário.

== Career statistics ==
=== Club ===
As of 20 June 2019

| Club | Season | League | | | National cup | | League cup | | Other | | Total | |
| Club | Season | Division | Apps | Goals | Apps | Goals | Apps | Goals | Apps | Goals | Apps | Goals |
|---|---|---|---|---|---|---|---|---|---|---|---|---|
| Vitória Guimarães B | 2018–19 | LigaPro | 1 | 0 | – | | – | | 0 | 0 | 1 | 0 |
| União Madeira | 2019–20 | Campeonato de Portugal | 6 | 0 | 0 | 0 | 0 | 0 | 0 | 0 | 6 | 0 |
| Career total | | | 7 | 0 | 0 | 0 | 0 | 0 | 1 | 0 | 7 | 0 |
