= Nicolas Bernardo =

Brazilian footballer

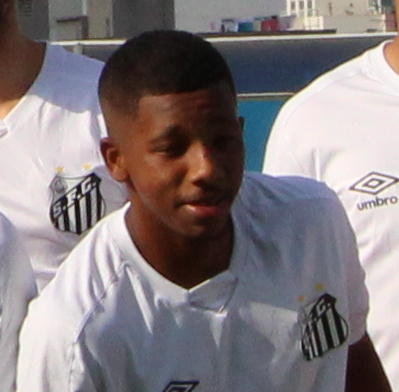

Personal information
- Full name: Nicolas Reis Bernardo
- Date of birth: 4 June 1999 (age 27)
- Place of birth: São Paulo, Brazil
- Height: 1.68 m (5 ft 6 in)
- Position: Forward

Team information
- Current team: Leça
- Number: 10

Youth career
- 2008–2019: Santos

Senior career*
Years	Team	Apps	(Gls)
2018–2019	Santos	0	(0)
2020–2023	Chaves	9	(0)
2021–2023	→ Pedras Salgadas (loan)	40	(1)
2023–	Leça	97	(17)
- * Club domestic league appearances and goals as of 12 September 2026

Nicolas Reis Bernardo (born 4 June 1999), sometimes known as just Nicolas, is a Brazilian footballer who plays as a forward for Portuguese Liga 3 club Leça.

He was included in The Guardian's "Next Generation 2016".

== Club career ==
=== Santos ===
Born in São Paulo, Nicolas Bernardo joined Santos' youth setup at the age of nine, and signed his first professional contract on 18 December 2015. In December 2018, after already featuring with the B-team in the Copa Paulista, he renewed his contract for a further year.

In March 2020, after failing to agree new terms and with his contract expired in December 2019, Nicolas Bernardo left Peixe.

=== Chaves ===
On 14 August 2020, Nicolas Bernardo moved abroad and signed a three-year contract with Portuguese LigaPro side GD Chaves. He made his professional debut on 18 September, coming on as a second-half substitute for José Gomes in a 0–0 home draw against Varzim SC.

== Career statistics ==
As of 2 November 2020.

Club	Season	League			State League		National Cup		League Cup		Continental		Other		Total	
Club	Season	Division	Apps	Goals	Apps	Goals	Apps	Goals	Apps	Goals	Apps	Goals	Apps	Goals	Apps	Goals
Santos	2018	Série A	0	0	—		0	0	—		—		3 (Note: Appearance(s) in Copa Paulista)	0	3	0
Chaves	2020–21	LigaPro	4	0	—		0	0	0	0	—		—		4	0
Career total			4	0	0	0	0	0	0	0	0	0	3	0	7	0
