= Filipe Maio =

Portuguese footballer

Personal information
- Full name: Filipe Bartolomeu Maio
- Date of birth: 6 January 1999 (age 27)
- Place of birth: Aveiro, Portugal
- Height: 1.85 m (6 ft 1 in)
- Position: Left-back

Team information
- Current team: Sanjoanense
- Number: 24

Youth career
- 2007–2010: Bom Sucesso
- 2010–2012: Recreativa Oiã
- 2012–2013: Gafanha
- 2013–2016: Sporting CP
- 2016–2017: Vitória Guimarães
- 2017–2018: Boavista
- 2018–2019: Portimonense

Senior career*
Years	Team	Apps	(Gls)
2019–2020	Cova da Piedade B	2	(1)
2020–2021	Cova da Piedade	13	(0)
2021–2022	Oliveirense	20	(1)
2022–2023	São João de Ver	26	(0)
2023–2024	Amora	27	(1)
2024–2025	Covilhã	23	(0)
2025–	Sanjoanense	23	(1)
- * Club domestic league appearances and goals as of 7 May 2026

Filipe Bartolomeu Maio (born 6 January 1999) is a Portuguese footballer who plays as a left-back for Sanjoanense.

== Football career ==
He made his professional debut for Cova da Piedade on 21 January 2021 in the Liga Portugal 2.
