= Pedro Lemos =

Portuguese footballer

PEDRO LEMOS
Personal information
- Full name: Pedro Jorge Pires Fernandes Lemos
- Date of birth: 17 March 1993 (age 33)
- Place of birth: São Torcato - Guimarães, Portugal
- Height: 1.80 m (5 ft 11 in)
- Position: Midfielder

Youth career
- 2004–2012: Vitória Guimarães

Senior career*
Years	Team	Apps	(Gls)
2012–2015	Vitória Guimarães B	48	(1)
2012–2013	Vitória Guimarães	1	(0)
2015–2017	Gil Vicente	45	(0)
2017–2018	Vilaverdense	30	(3)
2018–2020	Penafiel	30	(0)
2020–2021	Ermis Aradippou	15	(0)
- * Club domestic league appearances and goals as of 9 June 2021

Pedro Jorge Pires Fernandes Lemos (born 17 March 1993) is a Portuguese footballer who plays as a midfielder.

== Club career ==
He made his Primeira Liga debut for Vitória Guimarães on 17 February 2013 in a game against Moreirense.
