= Ansumane Faty =

Guinea-Bissauan footballer

Ansumane
Personal information
- Full name: Ansumane Faty Júnior
- Date of birth: 21 June 1991 (age 35)
- Place of birth: Bissau, Guinea-Bissau
- Height: 1.80 m (5 ft 11 in)
- Position: Striker

Youth career
- Sporting Bissau
- 2009–2010: Candal

Senior career*
Years	Team	Apps	(Gls)
2010–2011	Candal	31	(9)
2011–2012	Nogueirense	25	(7)
2012–2013	Ribeirão	28	(6)
2013–2016	Freamunde	90	(23)
2016	Oliveirense	15	(2)
2016	Felgueiras 1932	8	(1)
2017	Rebordosa	17	(1)
2017–2018	Oliveira Douro	27	(8)
2018	Cesarense	4	(0)
2018–2019	Coimbrões	20	(4)
2019–2020	Sousense	22	(3)
2020	Rio Tinto	2	(1)
2020	Aliados Lordelo	8	(1)
2021	Lousada	3	(0)
2021	São Pedro da Cova	7	(0)
2021–2022	Gens	5	(3)
2022–2023	Perosinho	24	(6)
2024–2025	Sanem	24	(14)

International career
2014–2016	Guinea-Bissau	6	(1)
- * Club domestic league appearances and goals as of 14:21, 16 April 2026 (UTC)

Ansumane Faty Júnior (born 21 June 1991 in Bissau), known simply as Ansumane, is a Guinea-Bissauan professional footballer who plays as a striker.
