= Leça F.C. =

Portuguese football club

Leça FC
- Full name: Leça Futebol Clube
- Founded: 1912
- Ground: Estádio do Leça FC
- Capacity: 4,529
- Chairman: António Pinho
- Manager: Mika
- League: Liga 3
- 2024–25: Campeonato de Portugal, Group B Champions
- Website: https://lecafutebolclube.com/
Home colours	Away colours

Leça Futebol Clube, better known as Leça FC or simply Leça, is a Portuguese football club located in the town of Leça da Palmeira, Matosinhos. Founded in 1912, it had a spell in the top-flight Primeira Liga in 1941–42 and between 1995 and 1998, when it was relegated for financial irregularities. In the 2025–26 season they played in the Campeonato de Portugal. The club currently play their home games at the Estádio do Leça FC, which holds a capacity of 4,529 spectators. The current chairman is António Pinho and their current manager is João Crespo. The club's shirt and socks are white while their shorts are green.

== History ==
Founded in 1912, Leca participated in the Portuguese championships, held in cup format, from the 1927–28 to 1931–32 season, reaching the quarter-finals in 1928–29.

In 1941, the team achieved promotion to the top division – Primeira Divisão, where they played for one season 1941-42. The next participation at this level occurred more than 50 years later.

Leca participated in the Portuguese Liga from 1995 to 1998 but a decision taken by the Portuguese Football Federation based on past acts of corruption decided to relegate Leça to the Liga de Honra for 1998–99 season. The team was expected to fight for promotion but the efforts were not enough to bring the team to the top level again. In the upcoming years, the club was affected by financial problems that cut some of the desire of wanting the team back to the top. Because of the team's lower budget, new goals were set. The main goal was now to make the club financially secure and then try to put the team back on the first division.

However, after a series of events of bad management of the financial status by the presidents, it has been related that some of the presidents stole money from the club to use for their own benefit, which was unpaid wages to the team professionals, unqualified team coaches and other sporting factors. Since then, they've been dubbed as strong candidates to promotion but never confirmed the expectations, finishing in mid-table and surprisingly sometimes near the bottom of the table.

In the 2002–03 season they were relegated from the Segunda Liga, a year later and from the third league (Segunda Divisão B). Since then they have made one appearance in the third tier of the league system - in the 2007/08 season, playing in the lower leagues, including at regional level. In the 2020–21 season of league Campeonato de Portugal they achieved promotion, but due to the inability to obtain a license due to debt to tax authorities, a place in the new Liga 3 was given to the team that took the next place.

Since June 7, 2021 registered as Leça Futebol SAD (Leça Futebol Clube - Futebol SAD)

In the 2022–23 season, the team finished 9th out of 14 in Serie B of the league Portuguese Championship, and since the last 6 teams were relegated, Leca moved to the Championship of Porto FA.

== Badge ==
The club's badge is in green and white, the club colours. The castle on top of it represents Leça da Palmeira, the city which the club was in on its foundation in 1912.

== Rivalries ==
- Leixões S.C.

== Notable players ==
- (Portugal) Ricardo Carvalho
- (Portugal) Sérgio Conceição

== Stadium ==
Leça play their games at the Estádio do Leça FC. The current stadium has played host to many matches down the years in the Portuguese Liga or in the Liga de Honra. It currently has a capacity of 4,529 spectators and has two big stands in green and white which symbolizes the club's colours. The stands also feature the name of the club on both sides of the pitch. The club built the stadium in 1992 as Leça were ready to go into the top flight of Portuguese football.

== Honours ==
- Segunda Liga (Tier 2)

- Winners (1): 1994–95

- Segunda Divisão (Tier 2)

- Runners-up (1): 1940–41

- Segunda Divisão B (Tier 3)

- Winners (1): 1992–93

- Terceira Divisão (Tier 4)

- Winners (1): 2006–07 (Série B)

- Campeonato de Portugal (league) (Tier 4)

- Winners (1): 2025–26

- Taça de Portugal

- Quarter-finals (2): 1994–95, 2021–22

- Campeonato de Portugal (1922–1938)

- Quarter-finals (1): 1928–29

=== League Cup and History ===
As of April 14, 2009

Season	Division	Pos.	Pl.	W	D	L	GS	Pts	Portuguese Cup	Notes
1968–69	II Divisão	7th	??	??	??	??	??	??	–	–
1969–70	II Divisão	14th	??	??	??	??	??	??	–	–
1970–71	II Divisão	7th	??	??	??	??	??	??	–	–
1971–72	II Divisão	5th	??	??	??	??	??	??	–	–
1972–73	II Divisão	8th	??	??	??	??	??	??	–	–
1973–74	III Divisão	9th	??	??	??	??	??	??	–	–
1974–75	III Divisão	12th	??	??	??	??	??	??	–	–
1975–76	III Divisão	9th	??	??	??	??	??	??	–	–
1976–77	III Divisão	14th	??	??	??	??	??	??	–	Relegated
1977–78	1º Escalão Dist.	1st	??	??	??	??	??	??	–	Promoted
1978–79	III Divisão	4th	??	??	??	??	??	??	–	–
1979–80	III Divisão	10th	??	??	??	??	??	??	–	–
1980–81	III Divisão	1st	??	??	??	??	??	??	–	Promoted
1981–82	II Divisão	10th	??	??	??	??	??	??	–	–
1982–83	II Divisão	14th	??	??	??	??	??	??	–	Relegated
1983–84	III Divisão	15th	??	??	??	??	??	??	–	Relegated
1984–85	Distritais – 1ª Divisão	8th	??	??	??	??	??	??	–	–
1985–86	Distritais – 1ª Divisão	2nd	??	??	??	??	??	??	–	Promoted
1986–87	III Div.	6th	??	??	??	??	??	??	–	Relegated
1987–88	III Div.	6th	??	??	??	??	??	??	–	Relegated
1988–89	III Div.	7th	??	??	??	??	??	??	–	Relegated
1989–90	III Div.	4th	??	??	??	??	??	??	–	Relegated
1990–91	II Divisão B	17th	??	??	??	??	??	??	–	
1991–92	II Divisão B	2nd	??	??	??	??	??	??	–	
1992–93	II Divisão B	1st	??	??	??	??	??	??	–	Promoted
1993–94	Liga de Honra	8th	??	??	??	??	??	??	–	
1994–95	Liga de Honra	1st	??	??	??	??	??	??	–	Promoted
1995–96	Primeira Liga	14th	??	??	??	??	??	??	–	–
1996–97	Primeira Liga	14th	??	??	??	??	??	??	–	Relegated
1997–98	Primeira Liga	12th	??	??	??	??	??	??	–	Relegated
1998–99	Liga de Honra	6th	??	??	??	??	??	??	–	
1999–2000	Liga de Honra	11th	??	??	??	??	??	??	–	
2000–01	Liga de Honra	13th	??	??	??	??	??	??	–	
2001–02	Liga de Honra	11th	??	??	??	??	??	??	–	
2002–03	Liga de Honra	17th	??	??	??	??	??	??	–	–
2003–04	II Div.	19th	??	??	??	??	??	??	–	Relegated
2004–05	III Div.	5th	??	??	??	??	??	??	–	–
2005–06	III Div.	9th	??	??	??	??	??	??	–	–
2006–07	III Div.	1st	??	??	??	??	??	??	–	Promoted
2007–08	III Div.	13th	??	??	??	??	??	??	–	Relegated
??	??	??	??	??	??	–				
2008–09	III Div.	7th	??	??	??	??	??	??	–	–
??	??	??	??	??	??	–				

== Current squad ==
As of 19 September 2026

Note: Flags indicate national team as defined under FIFA eligibility rules; some limited exceptions apply. Players may hold more than one non-FIFA nationality.

No.	Pos.	Nation	Player
1	GK	POR	Miguel Paiva
4	DF	POR	Fabio Baldé
5	DF	POR	Diogo Nunes
6	MF	POR	Berna
7	FW	BRA	Diego Fernandes
8	MF	POR	Nuno Pereira
9	FW	POR	Martim Fortes
10	FW	BRA	Nicolas Reis
11	FW	POR	Bernardo Mesquita
14	DF	POR	Duarte Maneta
16	DF	POR	Samu Sousa
17	FW	POR	Afonso Sousa
18	MF	POR	Manuel Miranda
20	MF	POR	Rodrigo Ferreira
21	MF	POR	Avelino

No.	Pos.	Nation	Player
22	DF	POR	André Coutinho
23	DF	POR	Diogo Ribeiro
24	GK	POR	Bruno Pinto
26	FW	POR	Nuno Barbosa
27	GK	BRA	Daniel Bruno
29	FW	COD	Jordi Kuange
31	FW	POR	David Rebelo
33	MF	POR	Diogo Pereira
41	DF	BRA	Cássio Scheid
57	DF	BRA	Richard
66	DF	LTU	Eduardas Jurjonas
71	MF	POR	Igor Real
99	FW	CUB	Romario Torres
75	FW	POR	Zé Domingos
88	MF	POR	Tiago Augusto (on loan from Torreense)

== Former players ==
- Wesley John – Saint Vincent and the Grenadines and Trinidad and Tobago international who played in Portugal for 23 years, including for clubs Ribeira Brava and Porto da Cruz, both below the Portuguese fourth tier)
