= Bruno Carvalho (footballer, born 1986) =

Portuguese footballer

Personal information
- Full name: Bruno Alexandre Silva Carvalho
- Date of birth: 10 March 1986 (age 40)
- Place of birth: Vila Franca de Xira, Portugal
- Height: 1.72 m (5 ft 7 1/2 in)
- Position: Forward

Team information
- Current team: 11 Esperanças
- Number: 7

Youth career
- 1996–1997: Vilafranquense
- 1997–2004: Benfica
- 2004–2005: Alverca

Senior career*
Years	Team	Apps	(Gls)
2005–2007	Carregado		
2007–2008	Operário	20	(1)
2008	Olivais e Moscavide	6	(1)
2009	Caniçal	18	(1)
2009	Sertanense	0	(0)
2009–2010	Caniçal	30	(6)
2010–2011	Farense	26	(2)
2011	Atlético CP	12	(2)
2012–2013	Antwerp	35	(2)
2013–2014	Heist	13	(0)
2014	Berchem Sport	9	(3)
2014–2015	Farense	34	(4)
2015–2016	Académico de Viseu	18	(2)
2016–2017	Farense	28	(0)
2017–2018	Louletano	16	(2)
2018	Armacenenses	8	(0)
2019	Moncarapachense	5	(1)
2020–	11 Esperanças	0	(0)
- * Club domestic league appearances and goals as of 1 August 2021

Bruno Alexandre Silva Carvalho (born 10 March 1986) is a Portuguese football player who plays for 11 Esperanças.

== Club career ==
He made his professional debut in the Segunda Liga for Atlético CP on 20 August 2011 in a game against Belenenses.
