= Alex Porto =

Brazilian footballer (born 1986)

Personal information
- Full name: Alexandre Pinheiro Porto Aquino
- Date of birth: 21 May 1986 (age 40)
- Place of birth: Tocantinópolis, Brazil
- Height: 1.77 m (5 ft 9 1/2 in)
- Position: Midfielder

Team information
- Current team: Vizela
- Number: 5

Youth career
- 2004–2005: Goiás

Senior career*
Years	Team	Apps	(Gls)
2006	Barra		
2007	CRAC		
2008	Trindade		
2008	Anápolis		
2008–2009	Penafiel		
2010	Boa	6	(1)
2011	Trindade	10	(1)
2012	Tocantins		
2012–2014	Felgueiras 1932	49	(7)
2014–2016	Académico de Viseu	52	(2)
2016–	Vizela	35	(0)
- * Club domestic league appearances and goals as of 15 March 2017

Alexandre Pinheiro Porto Aquino, known as Alex Porto (born 21 May 1986) is a Brazilian football player who plays for Vizela. He also holds Portuguese citizenship.

== Club career ==
He made his professional debut in the Campeonato Mineiro for Boa on 27 February 2010 in a game against Cruzeiro.
