= Carlitos (footballer, born July 1985) =

Portuguese footballer

Personal information
- Full name: João Carlos Dias Correia
- Date of birth: 23 July 1985 (age 41)
- Place of birth: Espinho, Portugal
- Height: 1.75 m (5 ft 9 in)
- Position: Forward

Youth career
- 1994–2004: Espinho

Senior career*
Years	Team	Apps	(Gls)
2004–2005	Riachense	?	(16)
2005	Espinho	1	(0)
2006	Fornos de Algodres		
2006–2007	Riachense	?	(18)
2007–2008	Monsanto	?	(38)
2008–2009	Arouca	26	(5)
2009	Monsanto	10	(1)
2010	Cesarense	21	(14)
2010	Espinho	9	(1)
2010–2011	Macedo Cavaleiros	20	(3)
2011–2012	Cesarense	32	(21)
2012–2016	Oliveirense	138	(16)
2016–2021	Espinho	132	(44)
2021–2024	Cesarense	97	(30)
Total		486+	(207)
- * Club domestic league appearances and goals

João Carlos Dias Correia (born 23 July 1985 in Espinho, Aveiro District), known as Carlitos, is a Portuguese former professional footballer who played as a forward.

His professional input consisted of 138 matches and 16 goals in the Segunda Liga, where he arrived at the age of 27 and where he represented solely U.D. Oliveirense.
