= Iuri Gomes =

Portuguese footballer

Personal information
- Full name: Iuri Queli Tomás Medeiros Almeida Gomes
- Date of birth: 11 October 1996 (age 30)
- Place of birth: Horta, Portugal
- Height: 1.73 m (5 ft 8 in)
- Position: Forward

Team information
- Current team: Vila Real

Youth career
- 2004–2007: Rio Mouro
- 2007–2012: Sporting
- 2012–2013: Benfica
- 2013–2015: Rio Ave

Senior career*
Years	Team	Apps	(Gls)
2015–2017	Rio Ave	0	(0)
2015	→ Farense (loan)	6	(0)
2016	→ Pedras Salgadas (loan)	14	(0)
2016–2017	→ Vilaverdense (loan)	26	(6)
2017–2018	Montalegre	23	(2)
2018	Caldas	9	(0)
2019	Bravos do Maquis		
2019–2020	Fabril Barreiro	8	(0)
2020–2021	União Santarém	21	(3)
2021–	Vila Real	3	(0)
- * Club domestic league appearances and goals as of 21 October 2021

Iuri Queli Tomás Medeiros Almeida Gomes (born 11 October 1996) is a Portuguese footballer who plays for Vila Real as a forward.

== Career ==
On 21 January 2015, Gomes made his professional debut with Rio Ave in a 2014–15 Taça da Liga match against Académica.

== Personal life ==
He is a nephew of Gil. Gil's son and Iuri's cousin Angel Gomes is in the Manchester United junior system.
