= Ícaro (footballer, born 1989) =

Brazilian footballer

Personal information
- Full name: Ícaro do Carmo Silva
- Date of birth: 16 April 1989 (age 37)
- Place of birth: Paracatu, Brazil
- Height: 1.81 m (5 ft 11 in)
- Position: Centre-back

Team information
- Current team: Santana

Senior career*
Years	Team	Apps	(Gls)
2010	Boavista (RJ)	0	(0)
2011	Cardoso Moreira		
2011	Legião		
2012–2013	Grêmio Anápolis	15	(0)
2013–2017	Feirense	92	(5)
2014–2015	→ Chaves (loan)	22	(1)
2017–2019	Tondela	21	(1)
2019–2022	Feirense	75	(5)
2022–2023	Académico de Viseu	16	(1)
2023–2025	Paços de Ferreira	25	(0)
2026–	Santana	0	(0)
- * Club domestic league appearances and goals as of 11 January 2026

Ícaro do Carmo Silva (born 16 April 1989) is a Brazilian professional footballer who plays as a centre-back for Campeonato Amapaense club Santana.

== Club career ==
On 13 June 2022, Ícaro signed a one-year deal with Académico de Viseu.

On 11 June 2023, Ícaro signed a two-year contract with recently-relegated to Liga Portugal 2 club Paços de Ferreira.
