= Feliz Vaz =

Portuguese footballer

Personal information
- Full name: Feliz Edgar Neto Vaz
- Date of birth: 9 April 1989 (age 37)
- Place of birth: Vizela, Portugal
- Height: 1.64 m (5 ft 5 in)
- Position: Forward

Team information
- Current team: Trofense
- Number: 30

Youth career
- 1999–2004: Porto
- 2004–2008: Vitória Guimarães

Senior career*
Years	Team	Apps	(Gls)
2008–2010	Serzedelo	48	(6)
2010–2011	Ribeirão	30	(7)
2011–2013	Rio Ave	1	(0)
2011–2012	→ Trofense (loan)	27	(2)
2013	→ Ribeirão (loan)	15	(2)
2014–2019	Famalicão	168	(27)
2019–2021	Feirense	54	(7)
2021–2023	Penafiel	57	(7)
2023–2026	Felgueiras	57	(6)
2026–	Trofense	11	(0)

International career
2007	Portugal U18	2	(1)
- * Club domestic league appearances and goals as of 15:34, 18 June 2026 (UTC)

Feliz Edgar Neto Vaz (born 9 April 1989 in Vizela, Braga District) is a Portuguese professional footballer who plays as a forward for Liga 3 club Trofense.
