= Mário Mendonça =

Portuguese footballer

Personal information
- Full name: Mário Albino Meira Mendonça
- Date of birth: 18 August 1991 (age 35)
- Place of birth: Esposende, Portugal
- Height: 1.82 m (6 ft 0 in)
- Position: Forward

Team information
- Current team: Vitória de Setúbal
- Number: 5

Youth career
- 2002–2003: Estrelas Faro
- 2003–2010: Esposende

Senior career*
Years	Team	Apps	(Gls)
2010–2012	Esposende	47	(15)
2012–2014	Chaves	25	(4)
2013–2014	→ Pedras Salgadas (loan)	8	(2)
2014–2016	Oliveirense	67	(5)
2016–2017	Vizela	16	(0)
2017–2018	Fátima	21	(0)
2018–2019	Merelinense	29	(1)
2019–2020	Loures	22	(0)
2020–2021	Beira-Mar	12	(4)
2021–2022	Torreense	11	(0)
2022–	Vitória de Setúbal	11	(1)
- * Club domestic league appearances and goals as of 12 February 2023

Mário Albino Meira Mendonça (born 18 August 1991) is a Portuguese footballer who plays for Vitória de Setúbal as a forward.

== Career ==
On 14 August 2013, Mendonça made his professional debut with Chaves in a 2013–14 Taça da Liga match against Oliveirense, when he replaced Arnold (80th minute).
