= Renan Soares =

Brazilian footballer

Personal information
- Full name: Renan Santos Soares
- Date of birth: 11 April 1989 (age 37)
- Place of birth: Aracajú, Brazil
- Height: 1.77 m (5 ft 10 in)
- Position: Midfielder

Senior career*
| Years | Team | Apps | (Gls) |
| 2009 | Colatinense | | |
| 2010 | Lagarto | | |
| 2010–2013 | Aguiar da Beira | | |
| 2013–2016 | Oliveirense | 104 | (9) |
| 2016–2017 | Gafanha | 29 | (5) |
| 2017–2018 | Fátima | 24 | (5) |
| 2018–2019 | Penalva Castelo | 3 | (1) |
| 2019–2020 | Lusitano FCV | 3 | (0) |
- * Club domestic league appearances and goals

Renan Santos Soares (born 11 April 1989) is a Brazilian former professional footballer who played as a midfielder. He played on the Portuguese second tier for Oliveirense.
