= Carela =

Portuguese footballer

Personal information
- Full name: João Tiago Oliveira Rodrigues
- Date of birth: 15 March 1988 (age 38)
- Place of birth: Ovar, Portugal
- Height: 1.76 m (5 ft 9 1/2 in)
- Position: Full back

Youth career
- 1999–2006: Ovarense
- 2006–2007: Espinho

Senior career*
| Years | Team | Apps | (Gls) |
| 2007–2011 | Espinho | 39 | (1) |
| 2011–2013 | Estarreja | 44 | (18) |
| 2013–2015 | Oliveirense | 94 | (1) |
| 2015–2017 | Estarreja | 37 | (2) |
| 2017 | Espinho | 19 | (1) |
| 2017–2019 | Pampilhosa | 53 | (4) |
| 2019–2020 | São João de Ver | 7 | (1) |
- * Club domestic league appearances and goals

João Tiago Oliveira Rodrigues (born 15 March 1988), simply known as Carela is a retired Portuguese footballer who played as a right back.
