= Rodrigo Ferreira (footballer, born 2001) =

Portuguese footballer

Personal information
- Full name: Rodrigo Filipe dos Santos Ferreira
- Date of birth: 4 November 2001 (age 25)
- Place of birth: Vinhais, Portugal
- Height: 1.78 m (5 ft 10 in)
- Position: Midfielder

Team information
- Current team: Leça
- Number: 20

Youth career
- 2009–2014: Monte de Vinhais
- 2014–2015: Futsal
- 2015–2019: Monte de Vinhais
- 2019–2020: Bragança

Senior career*
Years	Team	Apps	(Gls)
2019	Bragança	9	(0)
2020–2023	Leixões	19	(1)
2021–2022	→ Trofense (loan)	19	(0)
2022–2023	→ Montalegre (loan)	22	(0)
2023–2026	Covilhã	53	(1)
2026–	Leça	5	(1)
- * Club domestic league appearances and goals as of 12 September 2026

Rodrigo Filipe dos Santos Ferreira (born 4 November 2001) is a Portuguese professional footballer who plays as a midfielder for Liga 3 club Leça.

== Football career ==
He made his professional debut for Leixões on 30 December 2020 in the Liga Portugal 2.

On 15 July 2023, Ferreira signed for Liga 3 club Sporting da Covilhã.
