= Diogo Pires (Portuguese footballer) =

Portuguese footballer (born 1993)

Personal information
- Full name: Diogo Gonçalo Baptista Pires
- Date of birth: 7 May 1993 (age 33)
- Place of birth: Lisbon, Portugal
- Height: 1.82 m (5 ft 11 1/2 in)
- Position: Midfielder

Team information
- Current team: Ideal

Youth career
- 2001–2011: Belenenses
- 2011–2012: Atlético

Senior career*
Years	Team	Apps	(Gls)
2012–2013	Atlético	0	(0)
2012−2013	→ 1º Dezembro (loan)	19	(4)
2013–2015	Aves	21	(0)
2015	Ribeirão	12	(0)
2015–2016	Atlético	12	(0)
2016–2017	Oriental	21	(1)
2017–2018	Ideal	28	(1)
2018–2019	Sintrense	31	(6)
2019–	Ideal	5	(0)
- * Club domestic league appearances and goals as of 22:06, 17 November 2019 (UTC)

Diogo Gonçalo Baptista Pires (born 7 May 1993) is a Portuguese footballer who plays as a midfielder for S.C. Ideal.

== Football career ==
Born in Lisbon, Pires spent most of his youth career with local C.F. Os Belenenses. He made his professional debut on 5 August 2012 while at the service of Atlético Clube de Portugal, coming on as a late substitute in a 1–0 home win against S.C. Covilhã for the first round of the Taça da Liga.

On 15 May 2013, after a loan in the lower leagues at S.U. 1º de Dezembro, Pires signed a two-year contract with Segunda Liga club C.D. Aves. His first match in the competition occurred on 18 August, when he played 18 minutes in the 1–1 away draw to U.D. Oliveirense.

Pires competed in the third level in the following seasons, representing in quick succession G.D. Ribeirão, Clube Oriental de Lisboa, S.C. Ideal and S.U. Sintrense. The exception to this was 2015–16, when he appeared for former side Atlético in the second tier.
