= Micael Freire =

Portuguese footballer

Micael
Personal information
- Full name: Micael Héber Mendes Freire
- Date of birth: 18 November 1994 (age 31)
- Place of birth: Santa Maria da Feira, Portugal
- Height: 1.75 m (5 ft 9 in)
- Position: Right winger

Team information
- Current team: Gondomar
- Number: 20

Youth career
- 2005–2008: Olivais Moscavide
- 2008–2012: Alverca
- 2013: Feirense

Senior career*
Years	Team	Apps	(Gls)
2013–2017	Feirense	31	(1)
2013–2014	→ Esmoriz (loan)	28	(7)
2016–2017	→ Gafanha (loan)	18	(1)
2017–2018	Fafe	19	(1)
2018–	Gondomar	47	(1)
- * Club domestic league appearances and goals as of 20:24, 14 March 2020 (UTC)

Micael Héber Mendes Freire (born 20 November 1994) is a Portuguese footballer who plays for Gondomar SC as a right winger.

== Career ==
On 26 July 2014, Micael made his professional debut with Feirense in a 2014–15 Taça da Liga match against Beira-Mar.
