= Diogo Nunes =

Portuguese footballer

Personal information
- Full name: Diogo Guedes Nunes
- Date of birth: 10 November 1996 (age 30)
- Place of birth: Matosinhos, Portugal
- Height: 1.86 m (6 ft 1 in)
- Position: Centre back

Team information
- Current team: Leça
- Number: 5

Youth career
- 2006–2015: Leixões

Senior career*
Years	Team	Apps	(Gls)
2015–2016	Leixões	31	(1)
2016–2017	Sporting B	2	(0)
2017–2019	Boavista B	11	(1)
2019	→ Castelo Branco (loan)	6	(0)
2019–2020	Arouca	1	(0)
2020–2022	São Martinho	50	(2)
2022–2024	Felgueiras	2	(0)
2024	Marco 09	11	(0)
2024–	Leça	58	(0)
- * Club domestic league appearances and goals as of 12 September 2026

Diogo Guedes Nunes (born 10 November 1996) is a Portuguese footballer who plays for Liga 3 club Leça as a centre back.

== Football career ==
On 11 March 2015, Nunes made his professional debut with Leixões in a 2014–15 Segunda Liga match against Académico Viseu.
