= Henrique Gomes (footballer, born 1991) =

Portuguese footballer

Personal information
- Full name: Henrique Afonso Gomes
- Date of birth: 23 March 1991 (age 35)
- Place of birth: Seixal, Portugal
- Height: 1.81 m (5 ft 11 1/2 in)
- Position: Forward

Team information
- Current team: Oriental
- Number: 30

Youth career
- 2005–2010: Sporting

Senior career*
Years	Team	Apps	(Gls)
2010–2011	Real		
2011–2012	Moura	26	(1)
2012–2014	Carregado	34	(13)
2014–	Orienta	80	(12)
- * Club domestic league appearances and goals as of 9 April 2017

Henrique Afonso Gomes (born 23 March 1991) is a Portuguese footballer who plays for Oriental as a forward.

== Football career ==
On 20 August 2014, Gomes made his professional debut with Oriental in a 2014–15 Taça da Liga match against Olhanense.
