= A.D. Sanjoanense =

Portuguese association football club

Sanjoanense
- Full name: Associação Desportiva Sanjoanense
- Founded: 25 February 1924; 102 years ago
- Ground: Estádio Conde Dias Garcia, São João da Madeira, Portugal
- Capacity: 8,500
- Chairman: Joaquim Gonçalves
- Manager: Pedro Hipólito
- League: Campeonato de Portugal
- 2023–24: Liga 3 ,9th
- Website: www.ads.pt
Home colours	Away colours

Associação Desportiva Sanjoanense is a Portuguese football club based in São João da Madeira. Founded in 1924, it currently plays in the 4th division Campeonato de Portugal, holding home games at Estádio Conde Dias Garcia.

== Appearances ==
- Tier 1: 4
- Tier 2: 41
- Tier 3: 58 (approximate)
- Tier 4: 7 (approximate)

== Current squad ==
As of 24 March, 2026

Note: Flags indicate national team as defined under FIFA eligibility rules; some limited exceptions apply. Players may hold more than one non-FIFA nationality.

No.	Pos.	Nation	Player
1	GK	POR	João Monteiro
2	DF	POR	Janico
3	DF	POR	Nando
4	DF	POR	Rúben Cardoso
5	DF	POR	Rui Santos
6	DF	POR	André Serra
7	FW	POR	Tomás Rocha
8	MF	POR	Tomás Podstawski
10	MF	POR	Kiko Félix
11	FW	IRL	Olamide Shodipo
12	DF	POR	Vitinha
13	MF	POR	Edu Pinheiro
16	MF	POR	Vasco Gomes
17	FW	ESP	Elliot Gómez

No.	Pos.	Nation	Player
19	FW	ARG	Federico Cezar
20	MF	POR	Andrezinho
21	MF	POR	Rafa Gomes
23	MF	COL	Jhon Ordoñez
24	DF	POR	Filipe Maio
25	FW	POR	João Couto
27	DF	NGA	Kelechi John
30	FW	BRA	Talles Wander
33	DF	POR	Gonçalo Sá
36	GK	POR	André Duarte
57	MF	POR	Tiago Robalinho
73	MF	POR	Dinis Oliveira
76	DF	POR	Rodrigo Sousa

== Notable players ==
- (Portugal) António Sousa

== Managerial history ==
- (Portugal) António Sousa (1995 – 1997)

== League and Cup history ==
Season		Pos.	Pl.	W	D	L	GS	GA	-/+	P	Portuguese Cup	Notes
1936–37	Tier 2	3	6	1	2	3	9	18	-10	4		
1937–38	Tier 2	1	6	5	1	0	27	5	+22	11		
1939–40	Tier 2	1	6	4	1	1	26	7	+21	9		
1940–41	Tier 2	4	10	4	1	5	27	22	+5	9		
1941–42	Tier 2	3	14	6	2	6	41	26	+15	14		
1942–43	Tier 2	1	4	3	0	1	15	8	+7	6		
1943–44	Tier 2	1	10	9	1	0	35	12	+23	19		
1944–45	Tier 2	1	8	8	0	0	39	8	+31	16		
1945–46	Tier 2	2	8	4	1	3	25	20	+5	9		
1946–47	Premier Division	14	6	1	2	3	9	18	-10	4		
1947–48	Tier 2	5	14	5	2	7	26	26	0	12		
1948–49	Tier 2	5	14	4	2	7	22	27	-5	12		
1949–50	Tier 2	15	18	7	4	7	29	25	+4	18		
1950–51	Tier 3	1	10	8	1	1	37	8	+29	17	Promoted	
1951–52	Tier 2	4	18	10	2	6	41	25	+16	22		
1952–53	Tier 2	2	18	2	0	6	43	20	+23	24		
1953–54	Tier 2	6	26	13	2	11	51	47	+4	28		
1954–55	Tier 2	6	26	11	5	10	50	61	-11	27		
1955–56	Tier 2	4	26	15	3	8	53	42	-11	33		
1956–57	Tier 2	8	26	10	3	13	48	61	-13	3	1/16 final	
1957–58	Tier 2	9	26	10	3	13	50	55	-5	23		
1958–59	Tier 2	9	26	9	7	10	36	41	-5			
1959–60	Tier 2	8	26	12	1	13	52	50	+2	25	1/16 final	
1960–61	Tier 2	6	26	10	6	10	47	55	-8	26		
1961–62	Tier 2	6	26	12	3	11	42	47	-5	27		
1962–63	Tier 2	23	26	8	7	11	37	55	-18	23		
1963–64	Tier 2	11	26	8	5	13	42	54	-12	21		
1964–65	Tier 2	3	26	11	9	6	41	26	+15	31		
1965–66	Tier 2	1	26	16	4	6	55	21	+14	36		
1966–67	I Divisão	12	26	4	11	11	23	39	-16	19		
1967–68	I Divisão	10	26	7	7	12	22	40	-16	21	1/8 final	
1968–69	I Divisão	14	26	3	3	20	15	52	-37	9		
1969–70	Tier 2	2	26	12	8	6	46	27	+19	32	1/16 final	
1970–71	Tier 2	13	26	7	7	12	28	34	-6	21	1/128 final	
1971–72	Tier 2	5	30	12	9	9	41	33	+8	33	1/16 final	
1972–73	Tier 2	7	30	10	10	10	32	29	+3	30	1/128 final	
1973–74	Tier 2	4	38	18	10	10	46	32	+14	4	1/128 final	
1974–75	Tier 2	6	38	15	11	12	38	43	-5	41	1/128 final	
1975–76	II Divisão	11	38	14	9	15	35	46	-11	37	1/64 final	
1976–77	II Divisão	7	30	9	13	8	27	21	+6	31	1/16 final	
1977–78	II Divisão	15	30	8	7	15	24	30	-6	23		
1978–79	Tier 3	3	30	17	4	9	45	20	+23	38	1/128 final	
1979–80	Tier 3	1	30	18	7	5	53	23	+20	43	1/128 final	
1980–81	Tier 2	6	30	10	13	7	30	19	+11	33	1/64 final	
1981–82	Tier 2	3	30	14	11	5	40	19	+21	39	1/32 final	
1982–83	Tier 2	6	30	12	10	8	30	22	+8	34	1/32 final	
1983–84	Tier 2	3	30	14	8	8	52	25	+27	36	1/64 final	
1984–85	Tier 2	14	30	7	6	17	26	52	-27	20	1/32 final	
1985–86	II Divisão	14	30	7	9	14	27	49	-12	23	1/128 final	
1986–87	III Divisão	2	34	25	6	3	89	14	+75	90		
1989–90	II Divisão	4	34	17	7	10	54	38	+16	41	1/128 final	
1990–91	II Divisão	4	38	18	11	9	57	30	+27	47	1/32 final	
1991–92	II Divisão	2	34	18	10	6	52	28	+24	46	1/128 final	
1992–93	II Divisão	4	34	15	11	8	43	34	+9	41	1/128 final	
1993–94	II Divisão	8	34	12	10	12	41	30	+9	41	1/128 final	
1994–95	II Divisão	7	34	14	28	12	40	44	-4	35	1/16 final	
1995–96	II Divisão	14	34	11	8	15	39	52	-13	41	1/128 final	
1996–97	II Divisão	4	34	14	12	8	42	31	+11	54	1/128 final	
1997–98	II Divisão	3	34	17	11	6	46	19	+27	62	1/128 final	
1998–99	II Divisão	2	34	19	5	10	46	37	+9	62	1/32 final	
1999–2000	II Divisão	4	38	18	7	13	56	34	+21	61	1/64 final	
2000–01	II Divisão	3	36	20	6	10	66	45	+21	66	1/16 final	
2001–02	II Divisão	6	38	16	12	10	53	38	+15	60	1/16 final	
2002–03	II Divisão	9	36	13	12	11	49	41	+8	51	1/64 final	
2003–04	II Divisão	3	38	18	9	11	52	40	+12	63	1/16 final	
2004–05	II Divisão	5	36	14	11	11	46	40	+6	53	1/32 final	
2005–06	II Divisão	14	26	4	8	14	25	40	+15	20	1/64 final	
2006–07	III Divisão	3	28	15	3	10	34	28	+6	48	1/128 final	
2007–08	III Divisão	2	36	20	9	7	66	29	+37	47	1/64 final	
2008–09	II Divisão	12	32	4	11	17	23	47	-25	16	1/64 final	
2009–10	III Divisão	12	32	2	7	23	30	82	-52	17	1/256 final	
2010–11	Regional	1	34	23	6	5	70	26	44	75	1/256 final	
2011–12	III Divisão	9	32	11	8	13	41	48	-7	56	1/64 final	
2012–13	Regional	2	34	28	3	3	112	29	83	87	1/256 final	
2013–14	Regional	1	34	25	5	4	78	25	53	80	1/256 final	
2014–15	Seniores		0	0	0	0	0	0	0	0	1/64 final	
