= F.C. Cesarense =

Portuguese association football club

Cesarense
- Full name: Futebol Clube Cesarense
- Founded: 1932
- Ground: Estádio Mergulhão; Cesar, Oliveira de Azeméis, Portugal
- Capacity: 5,000
- Chairman: Pedro Rodrigues
- Head Coach: Miguel Oliveira
- League: Campeonato Sabseg (North Zone)
- 2020–21: Campeonato Sabseg (North Zone), 6th
- Website: www.fccesarense.com
Home colours	Away colours

Futebol Clube Cesarense (abbreviated as FC Cesarense) is a Portuguese football club based in Cesar, Oliveira de Azeméis in the district of Aveiro.

== Background ==
FC Cesarense currently plays in the Campeonato de Portugal which is the third tier of Portuguese football. The club was founded in 1932 and they play their home matches at the Estádio Mergulhão in Cesar, Oliveira de Azeméis. The stadium is able to accommodate 5,000 spectators.

The club is affiliated to Associação de Futebol de Aveiro and has competed in the AF Aveiro Taça. The club has also entered the national cup competition known as Taça de Portugal on occasions.

== Current squad ==
As of 28 November 2021

Note: Flags indicate national team as defined under FIFA eligibility rules; some limited exceptions apply. Players may hold more than one non-FIFA nationality.

No.	Pos.	Nation	Player
2	FW	POR	João Mota
3	DF	POR	Filipe Vieira
4	DF	POR	Daniel Santos
6	MF	POR	Pedro Portal
7	FW	POR	Carlitos
8	MF	POR	Filipe Leite
9	GK	POR	Pedro Justo
10	MF	POR	Dani Fernandes
11	MF	POR	Luís Vaz
12	GK	POR	André Moreira
13	DF	POR	André Cancela
16	FW	POR	Balelo

No.	Pos.	Nation	Player
17	FW	POR	Ricardo Catarino
18	MF	BRA	Matheus Santos
19	FW	POR	André Duarte
20	MF	POR	André Couto
21	FW	POR	Ricardo Tavares
22	DF	POR	Wilson Ferreira
23	DF	POR	Renato Moreira
26	DF	POR	Cabel
33	GK	POR	Gonçalo Gonçalves
77	FW	POR	Tintim
—	DF	POR	Miguel Pinho

== Season to season ==
Season	Level	Division	Section	Place	Movements
1990–91	Tier 5	Distritais	AF Aveiro – 1ª Divisão	5th	
1991–92	Tier 5	Distritais	AF Aveiro – 1ª Divisão Norte		
1992–93	Tier 5	Distritais	AF Aveiro – Honra Norte		
1993–94	Tier 5	Distritais	AF Aveiro – Honra Norte		
1994–95	Tier 5	Distritais	AF Aveiro – Honra Norte		
1995–96	Tier 5	Distritais	AF Aveiro – Honra Norte		
1996–97	Tier 5	Distritais	AF Aveiro – Honra Norte	1st	Promoted
1997–98	Tier 4	Terceira Divisão	Série C	10th	
1998–99	Tier 4	Terceira Divisão	Série C	4th	
1999–2000	Tier 4	Terceira Divisão	Série C	8th	
2000–01	Tier 4	Terceira Divisão	Série C	3rd	
2001–02	Tier 4	Terceira Divisão	Série C	7th	
2002–03	Tier 4	Terceira Divisão	Série C	5th	
2003–04	Tier 4	Terceira Divisão	Série C	3rd	
2004–05	Tier 4	Terceira Divisão	Série C	3rd	
2005–06	Tier 4	Terceira Divisão	Série C	11th	Relegated
2006–07	Tier 5	Distritais	AF Aveiro – 1ª Divisão	2nd	
2007–08	Tier 5	Distritais	AF Aveiro – 1ª Divisão	2nd	
2008–09	Tier 5	Distritais	AF Aveiro – 1ª Divisão	1st	Promoted
2009–10	Tier 4	Terceira Divisão	Série C – 1ª Fase	6th	Promotion Group
	Tier 4	Terceira Divisão	Série C Fase Final	2nd	Promoted
2010–11	Tier 3	Segunda Divisão	Série Centro	15th	Relegated
2011–12	Tier 4	Terceira Divisão	Série B – 1ª Fase	1st	Promotion Group
	Tier 4	Terceira Divisão	Série B Fase Final	1st	Promoted

== Honours ==
- Terceira Divisão: 2011/12
- AF Aveiro 1ª Divisão: 1982/83, 1984/85, 2008/09
- AF Aveiro 2ª Divisão: 1957/58, 1971/72, 1972/73
- AF Aveiro Taça: 2007/08
