= Matias Álvares Mourão =

Matias Álvares Mourão Knight of the Order of Christ

Fidalgo da Casa Real

Lord of Morgado da Prata

2nd Lord of Morgado de Mateus

Personal details
- Born: 28 May 1669 Sabrosa, Vila Real, Portugal
- Died: 1730
- Parents: Domingos Botelho Álvares Ribeiro (father); D. Joana Mourão (mother)
- Occupation: Noble, administrator

Matias Álvares Mourão, Morgado da Prata (28 May, 1669 – 1730), was the 2nd Morgado de Mateus. He was the son of Domingos Botelho Álvares Ribeiro and D. Joana Mourão.
