= Celeirós =

Celeirós may refer to:

- Celeirós (Braga), a civil parish in the municipality of Braga, Portugal
- Celeirós (Sabrosa), a civil parish in the municipality of Sabrosa, Portugal
