= São Martinho de Anta (Sabrosa) =

- Civil parish
- Location in Portugal
- Coordinates: 41°16′2″N 7°37′46″W
- Country: Portugal
- Region: Norte
- Intermunic. comm.: Douro
- District: Vila Real
- Municipality: Sabrosa
- Established: Settlement: 12th century Parish: c. 1258
- Disbanded: 2013

Area
  - Total: 15.95 km^{2} (6.16 sq mi)
- Elevation: 639 m (2,096 ft)

Population (2001)
  - Total: 870
  - Density: 55/km^{2} (140/sq mi)
- Time zone: UTC+00:00 (WET)
  - Summer (DST): UTC+01:00 (WEST)
- Postal code: 5060-432
- Area code: 259
- Patron: Nossa Senhora de Azinheira

São Martinho de Anta is a former civil parish in the municipality of Sabrosa, Portugal. In 2013, the parish merged into the new parish São Martinho de Antas e Paradela de Guiães. The small parish extends into an area of 15.95 km^{2}, and includes a minor population of 870 inhabitants (2001). It received its name, in the 20th century, but became more known, as the birthplace of the Portuguese poet and writer Miguel Torga, who lived in an isolated home in the parish.

== History ==
Greek coins were dated in this region by Dr. Rui de Serpa Pinto, who suggested that their existence in this area date back to 385 (they have since disappeared). The coins were accidentally found at the beginning of the 20th century.

Another remnant of its historical past was the Arrecada de S. Martinho, a golden lunula structure with hollow, triangular appendages and hanging double system, possibly dating from the 4th century, and connected with the Phoenicians.

São Martinho de Anta was part of the early settlements that were prescribed in the 12th and 13th century foral allocated to the lands of Panois, specifically the settlements of Souto Maior and Roalde. In addition to the place of Anta, São Martinho de Anta was characterized by an antique castro, which later was the base for their names.

The foral for Roalde mentions the locality, also referring to the residence of nobles and knights that lived in the area. The 1258 Inquirições referred to:

"they say that the King gave that royal land to his priest for a horse and mule and a falcon..."

The King mentioned was likely King Sancho I, and that Roalde pertained to the actual São Martinho de Anta ecclesiastical parish, which was dependent on the administration of the Sé in Braga.

It is unclear when São Martinho began being referred to with the suffix de Antas or d'Antas. It is clear that Portuguese (and early Brazilian) encyclopedias (such as the Luso-Brasileira, O Grande Dicionário da Verbo Universal) refers to São Martinho de Antas in 1406.

It was elevated to the status of vila (town) on 30 June 1999. Although there is a tendency to refer to the parish as São Martinho de Antas, in reality, the community was fixed by decree as São Martinho de Anta. Moreover, the decree-law 64/99, refers to the settlement as a villa in article one as:

The settlement of São Martinho de Anta, in the municipality of Sabrosa, district of Vila Real, is elevated to the category of town.

== Geography ==
São Martinho de Anta is situated five kilometres from the municipal seat, along the roadway that connects Sabrosa and Vila Real. It includes various hamlets and places including Anta, Garganta, Roalde, São Martinho de Anta, Queda and Fragas, occupying an area of approximately 16 km^{2}. It is the largest population in Sabrosa, after the municipal seat, but its population increases considerably during the month of August, due to returnee emigrants on their vacations.

In the location of Tenaria (Roalde), the Ceira River is known to spring, bring water to the Douro River.

In addition to recreational sites, as an autocross track and tennis courts, the parish is benefited by many local services, such as the daily trash collection, connected to public water supply and drainage, a day centre, an extension of the municipal health care centre, pharmacy, post office, primary school and mini-market.

== Architecture ==
- Chapel of Nossa Senhora da Azinheira (Our Lady Day of the Holmoak), dating from the 18th century, it includes an ornate retable and painted ceiling. It is the centre of annual pilgrimages in honour of the Virgin Mary on 15 August and on 11 November dedicated to Saint Martin.

== Notable citizens ==
- Adolfo Correia Rocha, more commonly known as Miguel Torga (12 August 1907 – Coimbra; 17 January 1995), a medic, poet and writer, receiving literary awards for his poetry, short stories, theater and a 16 volume diary, including "Os Contos da Montanha".
