= São Martinho de Antas e Paradela de Guiães =

- Civil parish
- Location in Portugal
- Coordinates: 41.25°N 7.63°W
- Country: Portugal
- Region: Norte
- Intermunic. comm.: Douro
- District: Vila Real
- Municipality: Sabrosa

Area
  - Total: 25.45 km^{2} (9.83 sq mi)

Population (2011)
  - Total: 1,013
  - Density: 39.80/km^{2} (103.1/sq mi)
- Time zone: UTC+00:00 (WET)
  - Summer (DST): UTC+01:00 (WEST)

São Martinho de Antas e Paradela de Guiães is a civil parish in the municipality of Sabrosa, Portugal. It was formed in 2013 by the merger of the former parishes São Martinho de Antas and Paradela de Guiães. The population in 2011 was 1,013, in an area of 25.45 km^{2}.
