= New Tales from the Mountain =

First edition (publ. Coimbra Editora)

New Tales from the Mountain (Portuguese: Novos Contos da Montanha) is a short story collection written by the Portuguese writer Miguel Torga and published in 1944.
