= Vítor Alves (footballer, born 1985) =

Portuguese footballer

Personal information
- Full name: Vítor Manuel Fernandes Alves
- Date of birth: 11 April 1985 (age 41)
- Place of birth: Sabrosa, Portugal
- Height: 1.90 m (6 ft 3 in)
- Position: Right back

Team information
- Current team: Montalegre
- Number: 37

Youth career
- 1996–1999: AD Sabro
- 1999–2002: Abambres
- 2002–2004: Porto

Senior career*
Years	Team	Apps	(Gls)
2004–2006	Porto B	42	(7)
2006–2007	União Madeira	15	(3)
2007–2008	Beira Mar	6	(0)
2007–2008	→ Avanca (loan)	11	(0)
2008–2009	Chaves	27	(2)
2009–2011	Santa Clara	34	(0)
2012–2013	Naval	25	(1)
2013–2014	Freamunde	27	(1)
2014–2015	Tondela	39	(1)
2015–2016	Aves	28	(0)
2016–2017	Pedras Salgadas	11	(0)
2017–2018	Santa Clara	47	(0)
2018–2019	Montalegre	26	(0)
2019	Loures	3	(0)
2020–	Montalegre	27	(1)

International career
2002–2003	Portugal U18	4	(0)
2003–2004	Portugal U19	13	(0)
2005–2006	Portugal U20	9	(0)
- * Club domestic league appearances and goals as of 1 August 2021

Vítor Manuel Fernandes Alves (born 11 April 1985), is a Portuguese footballer playing for C.D.C. Montalegre.

== Club career ==
Though Alves, played for the youth academy of Porto, he could not break into the first team and instead had to remain contended with 42 appearances between 2004 and 2006 for Porto B. After playing for clubs in the lower divisions, he signed with Santa Clara in 2009 and played there till 2011. His second season with the Segunda Liga club was hindered by injuries.

In July 2012, he signed for another club in the Segunda Liga, Naval. The following season, he stepped a division lower with Freamunde.
