= Mariana Coelho =

Brazilian writer

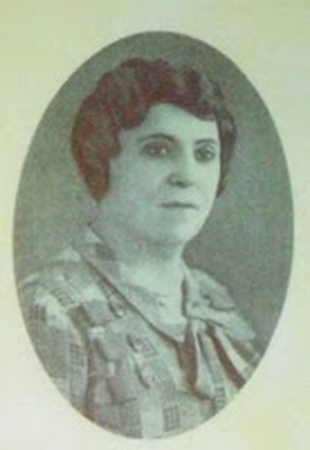
Professor Mariana Coelho

Mariana Coelho (10 September 1857 – 29 November 1954) was a Portuguese Brazilian educator, essayist and poet, and a feminist pioneer in Brazil.

== Early years ==
She was born in Sabrosa, a remote village in northern Portugal. She was the daughter Manoel Antônio Coelho Ribeiro and Maria do Carmo Teixeira Coelho, and a sister of Carlos Alberto Teixeira Coelho (a writer who migrated to Brazil with her) and Thomaz Alberto Teixeira Coelho (a Portuguese army captain).

== Career ==
She emigrated to Brazil in 1892 at the age of 35 years, and settled in Curitiba, Brazil. In early 1893, her first poems were published. The bond with her brother Carlos was a decisive factor in her rapid entry into the literary community of Curitiba. It assured her automatic access to the literary world.

In 1902, she founded the College Alberto Santos Dumont and ran it until 1917. In 1908, she was awarded the silver medal at the National Exhibition in Rio de Janeiro for her book Paraná mental. Later, in Curitiba, she was director of the Escuela Profesional Femenina República Argentina, founded in 1916, which was instrumental in the development of women's emancipation in the region. She initially served as a professor but in 1926, took up the post of Director, remaining until 1940.

She joined the Federación Brasileña para el Progreso Femenino (FBPF), participating in feminist conferences in 1922, 1933 and 1936. Her most notable work was La evolución del feminismo: subsidios para su historia. She was patron of the chair No. 30 of the Academia Paranaense de Poesía and No. 28 chair of the Academia Femenina de Letras de Paraná.

She died unmarried of a heart attack in Curitiba on 29 November 1954, at the age of 97 years.

== Selected works ==
- 1908: O Paraná mental
- 1933: A evolução do feminismo: subsídios para a sua historia
- 1934: Um brado de revolta contra a morte violenta
- 1937: Linguagem
- 1939: A primavera
- 1940: Cambiantes (contos e fantasías)
- 1956 (posthumous): Palestras educativas

== Bibliography ==
- Besse, Susan K.: Modernizando a desigualdade: reestruturação da ideología de gênero no Brasil (1914-1940). São Paulo: Editora da Universidade de São Paulo, 1999, págs. 173, 188, 198, 270, 278 y 312. (in Portuguese)
- Kamita, Rosana Cássia: Resgates e ressonâncias: Mariana Coelho. Florianópolis: Mulheres, 2005. (in Portuguese)
- Matos, María Izilda, et al.: Deslocamentos e historias: os portugueses. Bauru: EDUSC, 2008, pág. 276-278. (in Portuguese)
- Páginas Escolhidas - Literatura vol. II. Curitiba: Assembleia Legislativa do Paraná, 2003, pág. 189. (in Portuguese)
- Rocha Pombo, José Francisco: O Paraná no Centenário 1500-1900. Río de Janeiro: J. Olympio, 1980, pág. 133. (in Portuguese)
- Silva, Jacicarla Souza da: Vozes femininas na poesía latino-americana. São Paulo: Cultura Acadêmica, 2009. pág. 46. (in Portuguese)
- Sina, Amalia: Mulher e trabalho: o desafío de conciliar diferentes papéis na sociedade. São Paulo: Saraiva, 2005, págs. 45-46. (in Portuguese)
- Teixeira, Níncia Cecília Ribas Borges: Escritas de mulheres e a (des)construção do cânone literário na pósmodernidade: cenas paranaenses. Guarapuava: Unicentro, 2008, pág. 69. (in Portuguese)
- Vechia, Ariclê: (org) et al.: A escola secundária: modelos e planos (Brasil, séculos XIX e XX). São Paulo: Annablume, 2003, págs. 215 y 236. (in Portuguese)
