= Miguel Torga =

Portuguese writer (1907–1995)

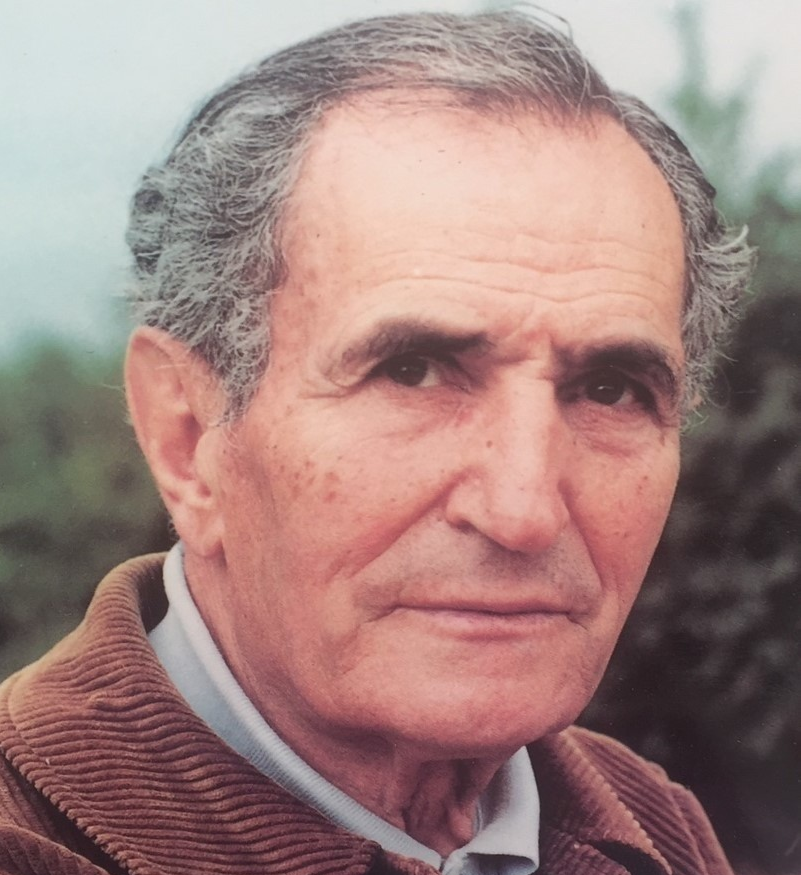
- Miguel Torga
- Born: Adolfo Correia da Rocha; 12 August 1907; São Martinho de Anta
- Died: 17 January 1995 (aged 87); Coimbra
- Occupations: Writer, physician
- Spouse: Andrée Crabée da Rocha
- Writing career
- Genres: short story, poetry, novel, play, essay, diary
- Notable works: Bichos, Contos da Montanha, Novos Contos da Montanha
- Literary movement: Modernism

Miguel Torga (Portuguese: [miˈɣɛl ˈtɔɾɣɐ]), pseudonym of Adolfo Correia da Rocha (São Martinho de Anta, Sabrosa, Vila Real district, 12 August 1907 – Coimbra, 17 January 1995), is considered one of the greatest Portuguese writers of the 20th century. He wrote poetry, short stories, a genre in which he is accounted a master, theater and a 16 volume diary, written from 1932 to 1993.

== Life ==
He was born on the 12th of August, 1907. In the village of São Martinho de Anta in the Trás-os-Montes e Alto Douro region (northern Portugal), to small-time farmer parents Francisco Correia da Rocha and wife Maria da Conceição de Barros. After a short spell as a student in a catholic seminary in Lamego, his father sent him to Brazil in 1920, where he worked on an uncle's coffee plantation. His uncle, finding him to be a clever student, decided to pay for his studies. Torga returned to Portugal in 1925 to complete high school and in 1933 graduated in Medicine at the University of Coimbra. After graduation he practiced in his village of São Martinho de Anta and in other places around the country. By this time, he started writing and self-publishing his books for a number of years. In 1941, he established himself as an otolaryngologist physician in Coimbra.

He married the academic and literary critic Andrée Crabbé Rocha; they had one daughter, Clara Crabée da Rocha (b. Coimbra, 1955), a literary academic who became the second wife in 1985 of Vasco Graça Moura.

== Literary work and recognition ==
He was a member of the literary movement Presença for a short period before founding two cultural magazines in the 1930s. After the publication of the book O Quarto Dia da Criação do Mundo he was arrested for two months, between December 1939 and February 1940.

His agnostic beliefs are reflected in his work, which deals mainly with the nobility of the human condition in a beautiful but ruthless world where God is either absent or nothing but a passive and silent, indifferent creator.

The recognition of his work earned him several important awards, as the Montaigne Prize, in 1981, and the first ever Prémio Camões in 1989. He was several times nominated for the Nobel Prize of Literature, from 1959 to 1994, and it was often believed that he would be the first Portuguese language writer to win it (José Saramago would eventually become the first Portuguese literary Nobel winner in 1998). Brazilian novelist Jorge Amado several times stated that Torga deserved that honour and the 1978 nomination had the support of Vicente Aleixandre, the winner of the previous years.

== Works ==
=== Poetry ===
- Ansiedade (1928)
- Rampa (1930)
- O Outro Livro de Job (1936)
- Lamentação (1943)
- Nihil Sibi (1948)
- Cântico do Homem (1950)
- Alguns Poemas Ibéricos (1952)
- Penas do Purgatório (1954)
- Orfeu Rebelde (1958)

=== Fiction ===
- Pão Arábio (1931)
- Farrusco. The Blackbird and other Stories from the Portuguese. Translated with an Introduction by Denis Brass. Illustrations by Gregorio Prieto. George Allen & Unwin Ltd.; London, 1950.
- Criação do Mundo. Os Dois Primeiros Dias (1937; autobiographic basis) (English: The Creation of the World - The First and Second Day)
- O Terceiro Dia da Criação do Mundo (1938; autobiographic basis)
- O Quarto Dia da Criação do Mundo (1939; autobiographic basis)
- O Quinto Dia da Criação do Mundo (1974; autobiographic basis)
- O Sexto Dia da Criação do Mundo (1981; autobiographic basis)
- Bichos (1940; short stories)
- Contos da Montanha (1941; short stories)
- O Senhor Ventura (1943; novel)
- Novos Contos da Montanha (1944; short stories) (English: New Tales from the Mountain)
- Vindima (1945) (English: Grape Harvest)
- Pedras lavradas (1951)
- Fogo Preso (1976)

=== Theatre ===
- Terra Firme e Mar (1941)
- O Paraíso (1949)
- Sinfonia (1947; dramatic poetry)

=== Travel notes ===
- Portugal (1950)
- Traço de União (1955)

=== Diary ===
- Diário (16 volumes, published from 1941 to 1994) (Diary)

=== Posthumously published work ===
- Poesia Completa (2000)

== Prizes ==
- Prémio Diário de Notícias (1969)
- Prémio Internacional de Poesia (1977)
- Montaigne Prize (1981)
- Prémio Camões (1989)
- Prémio Vida Literária da Associação Portuguesa de Escritores (1992)
- Prémio da Crítica, for his entire work (1993)

== See also ==
- Portuguese Poetry
