= Celeirós (Sabrosa) =

- Civil parish
- Location in Portugal
- Coordinates: 41.243°N 7.558°W
- Country: Portugal
- Region: Norte
- Intermunic. comm.: Douro
- District: Vila Real
- Municipality: Sabrosa

Area
  - Total: 5.25 km^{2} (2.03 sq mi)
- Elevation: 475 m (1,558 ft)

Population (2011)
  - Total: 222
  - Density: 42.3/km^{2} (110/sq mi)
- Time zone: UTC+00:00 (WET)
  - Summer (DST): UTC+01:00 (WEST)
- Postal code: 5060
- Area code: 259

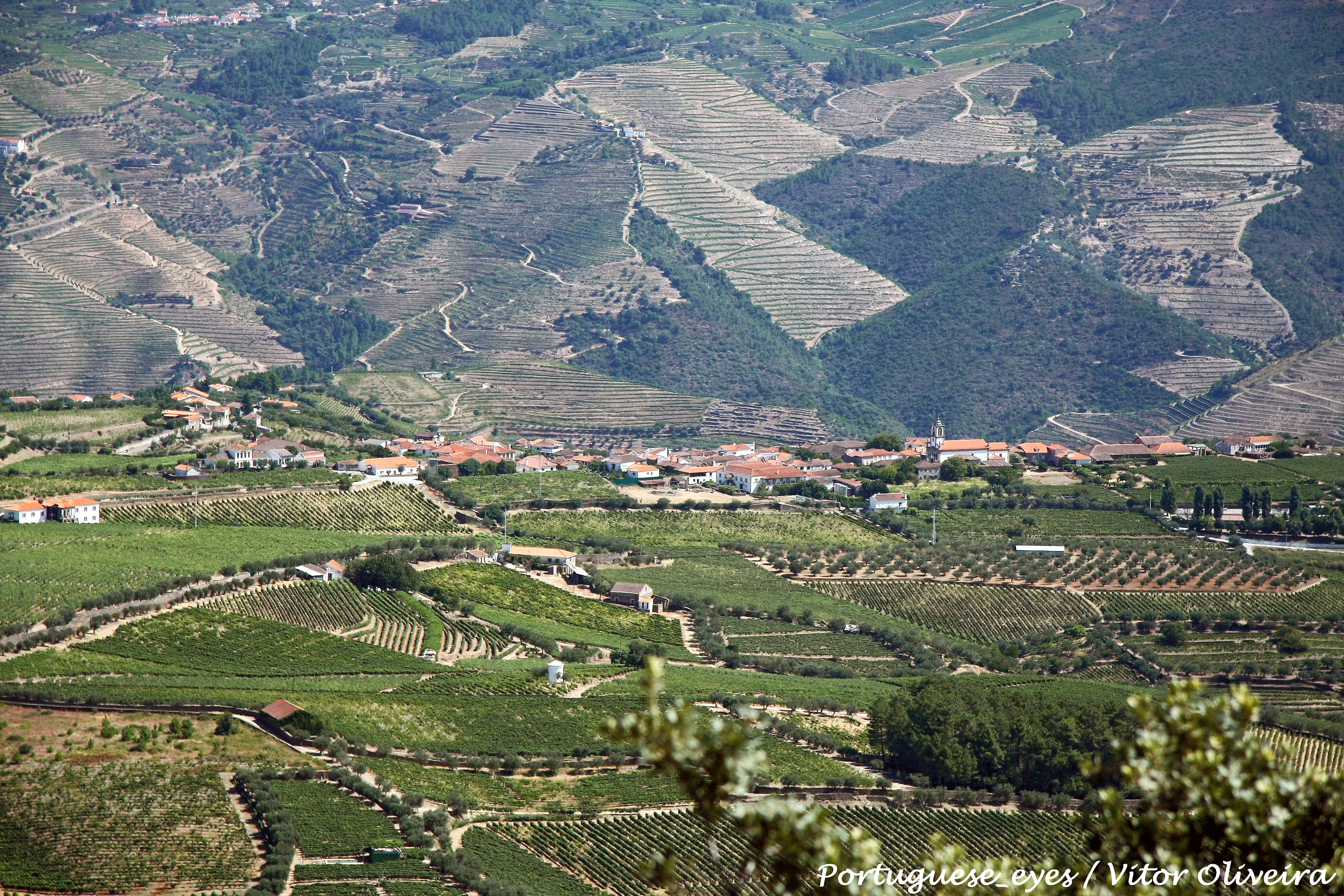
Celeirós

Celeirós is a civil parish in the Trás-os-Montes municipality of Sabrosa. The population in 2011 was 222, in an area of 5.25 km².

== History ==
Historically, the parish of Celeirós has its origins in a foral (charter) that was issued by Afonso Henriques on 4 December 1160.

The Casa dos Botelhos Pimenteis (House of the Botelho-Pimental Family) dates to the 19th century, and, along with the Casa da Fonte (House of the Fountain), with its richly -sculpted exterior and coat-of-arms, represent some of the older estates that permeated the Douro valley. Similarly, the Casa do Bucheiro (House of the Bucheiro Family), another family estate with noble crest, it was the home of one of the early founders of the community. Other examples include the Casa dos Vilares (House of the Vilar Family) erected in the 20th century, and the Casa do Padre Fausto (House of Father Fausto).

== Geography ==
It is located 5 kilometres (3.1 mi) from the municipal seat of Sabrosa and 12 kilometres (7.5 mi) from Pinhão, suspended over the valley of the Pinhão River.

The parish is serviced by garbage pickup, water supplies and sewage treatment, in addition to its local installations that include: day centre, health centre, post office, primary school (Portuguese: Escola do 1.º Ciclo do Ensino Básico), mini-market and other shops.

== Economy ==
Celeirós, is known locally for its Porto and table wines.

So known for its wines with fruity taste, in 1756 it was garland for its quality and excellence.

== Architecture ==
Apart from the classification of Celeiros, by the Instituto de Gestão do Património Arquitectónico e Arqueológico as a historical urban agglomeration, the parish is home to several culturally designated buildings and structures, that date back to the 16th-17th centuries:

=== Civic ===
- Residence of the Fountain and Chapel of Saint Francis (Portuguese: Casa da Fonte e Capela de São Francisco)
- Residence of the Butcher (Portuguese: Casa do Bucheiro)
- Residence of the Vilares (Portuguese: Casa dos Vilares)
- Celeiros Primary School (Portuguese: Escola Primário de Celeiros)
- (Old) Fountain of Celeiros (Portuguese: Fonte Velho de Celeiros)

=== Religious ===
- Chapel of Santo Amaro (Portuguese: Capela de Santo Amaro), its existence was first mentioned by Father António de Santa Marta Lobo, on 30 March 1758, a chapel in Paradelinha;
- Chapel of São Bento (Portuguese: Capela de São Bento)
- Church of São Pedro (Portuguese: Igreja Paroquial de Celeiros/Igreja de São Pedro)
