= Sabrosa =

- Municipality
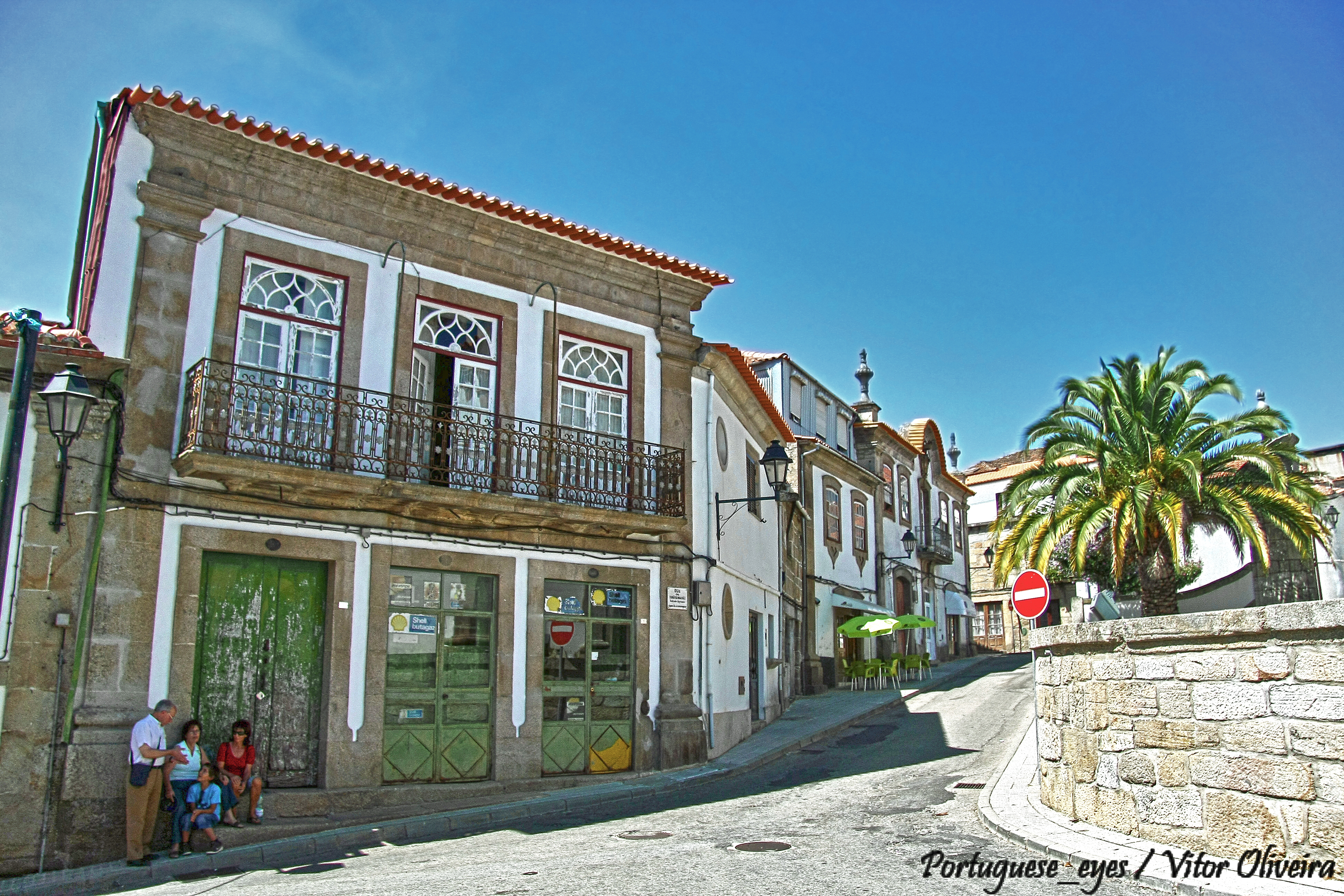
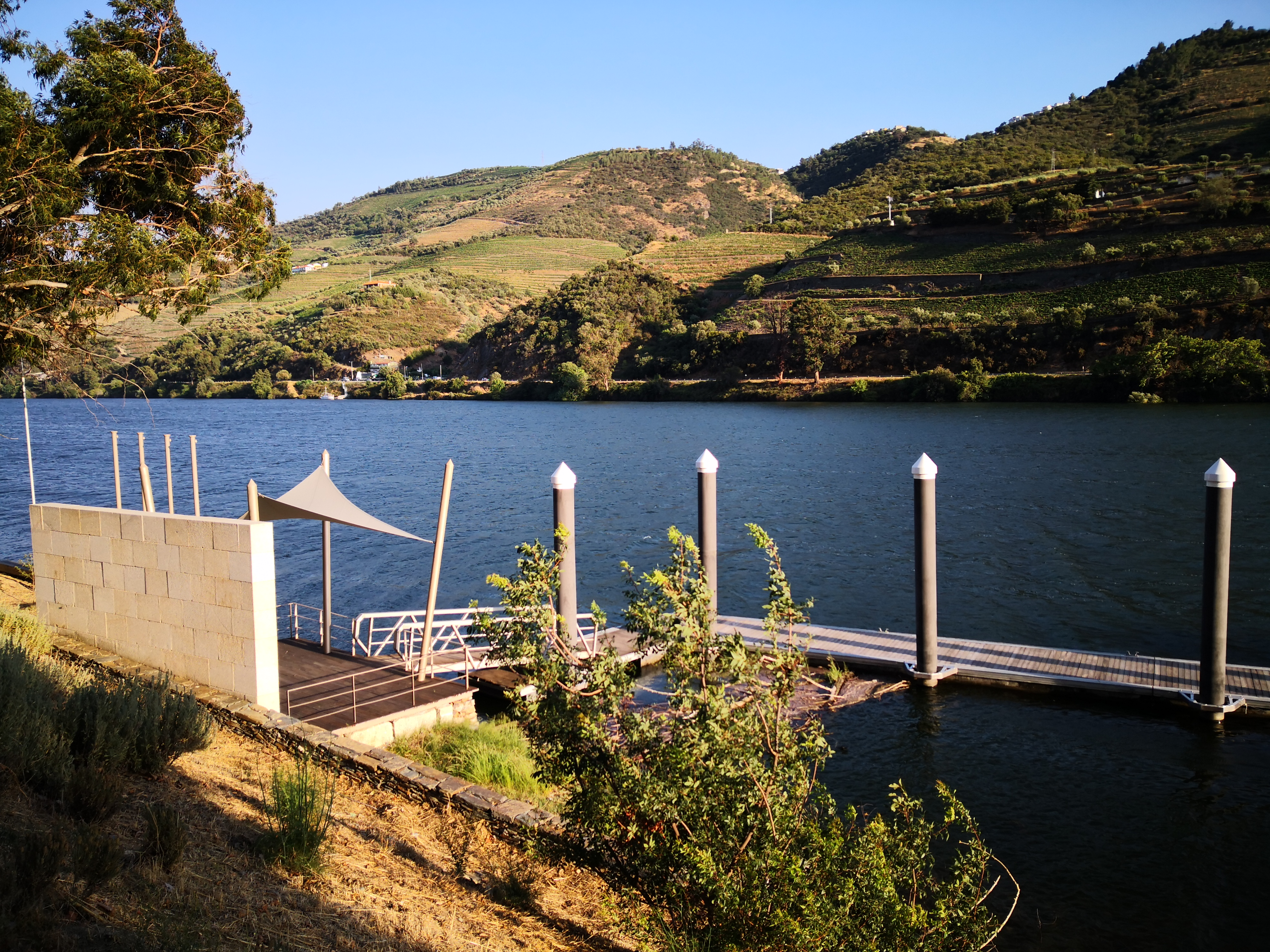
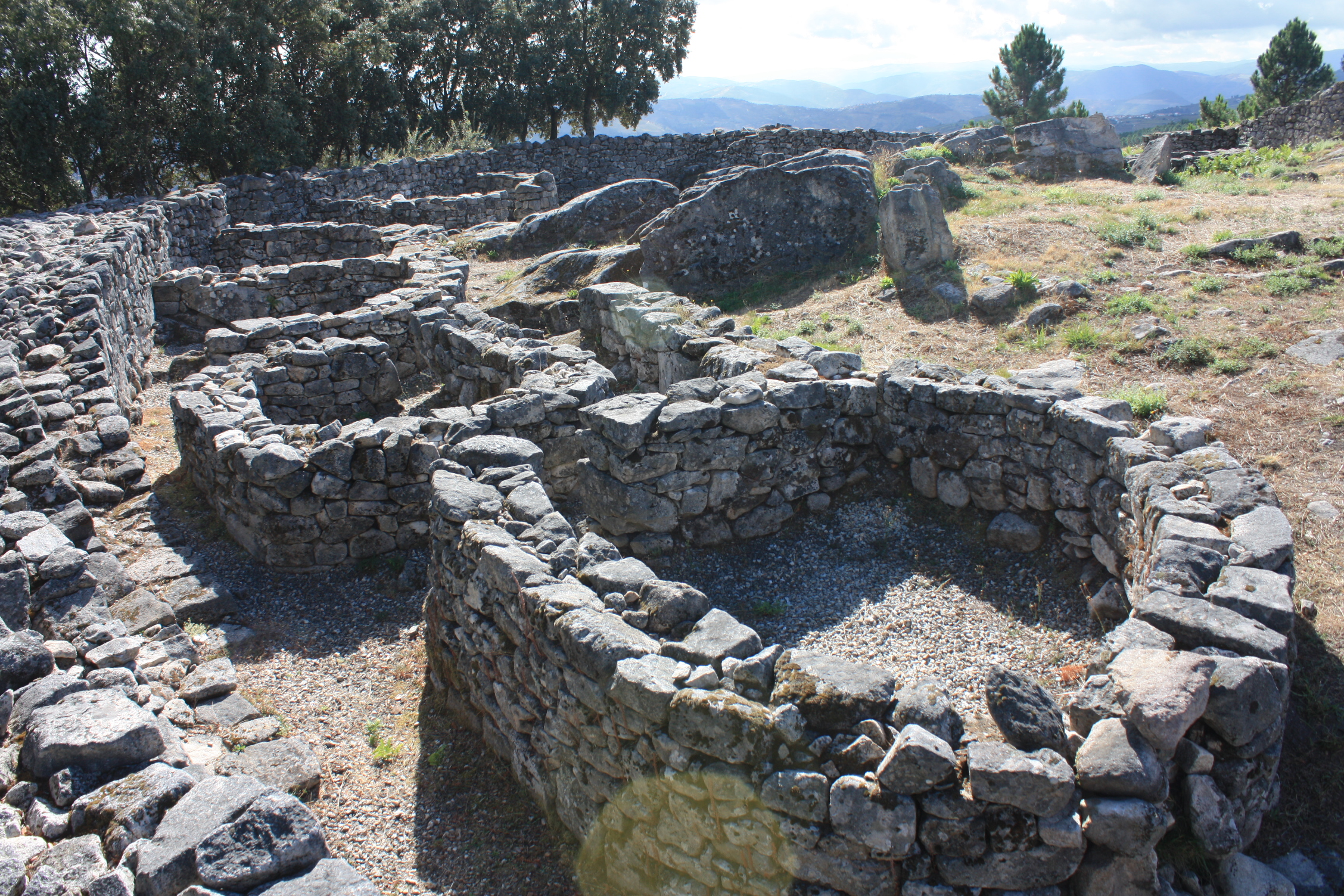
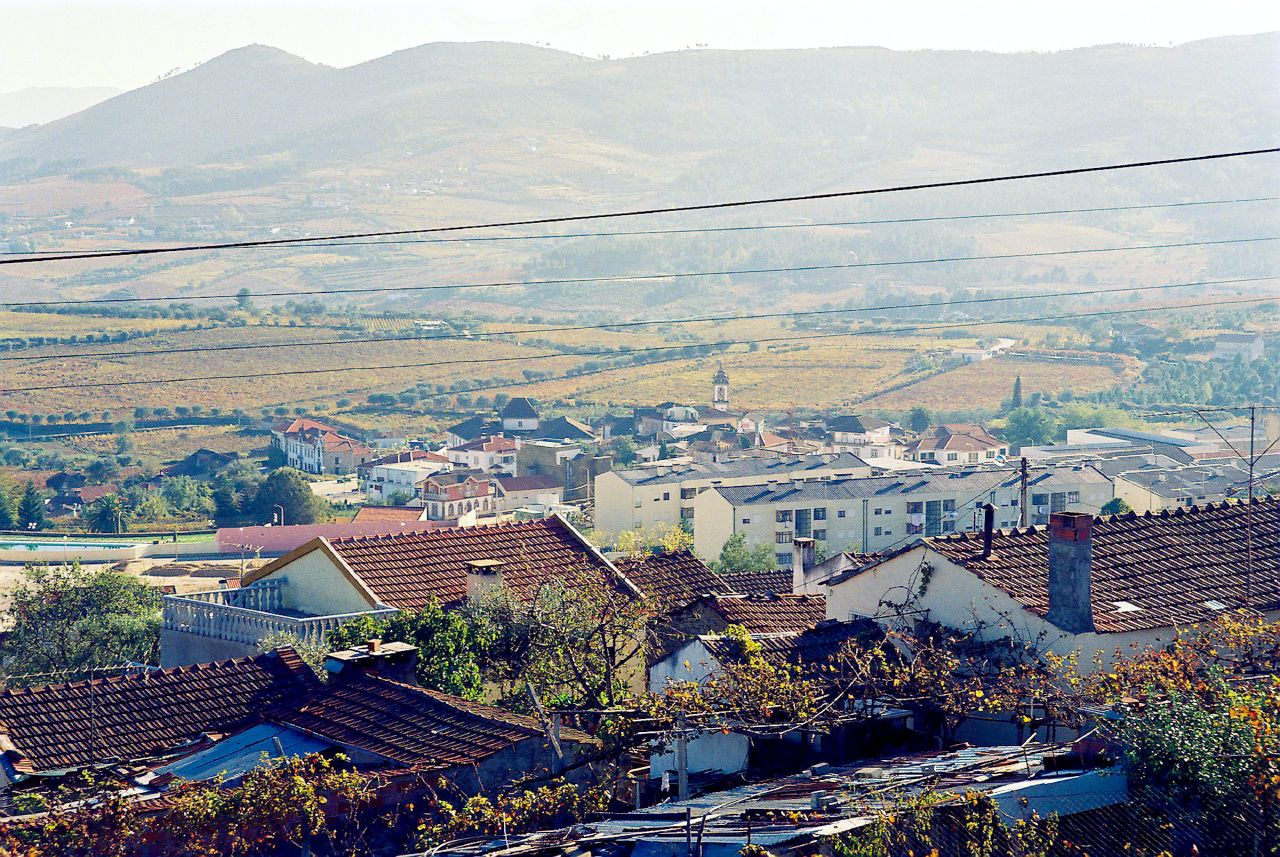
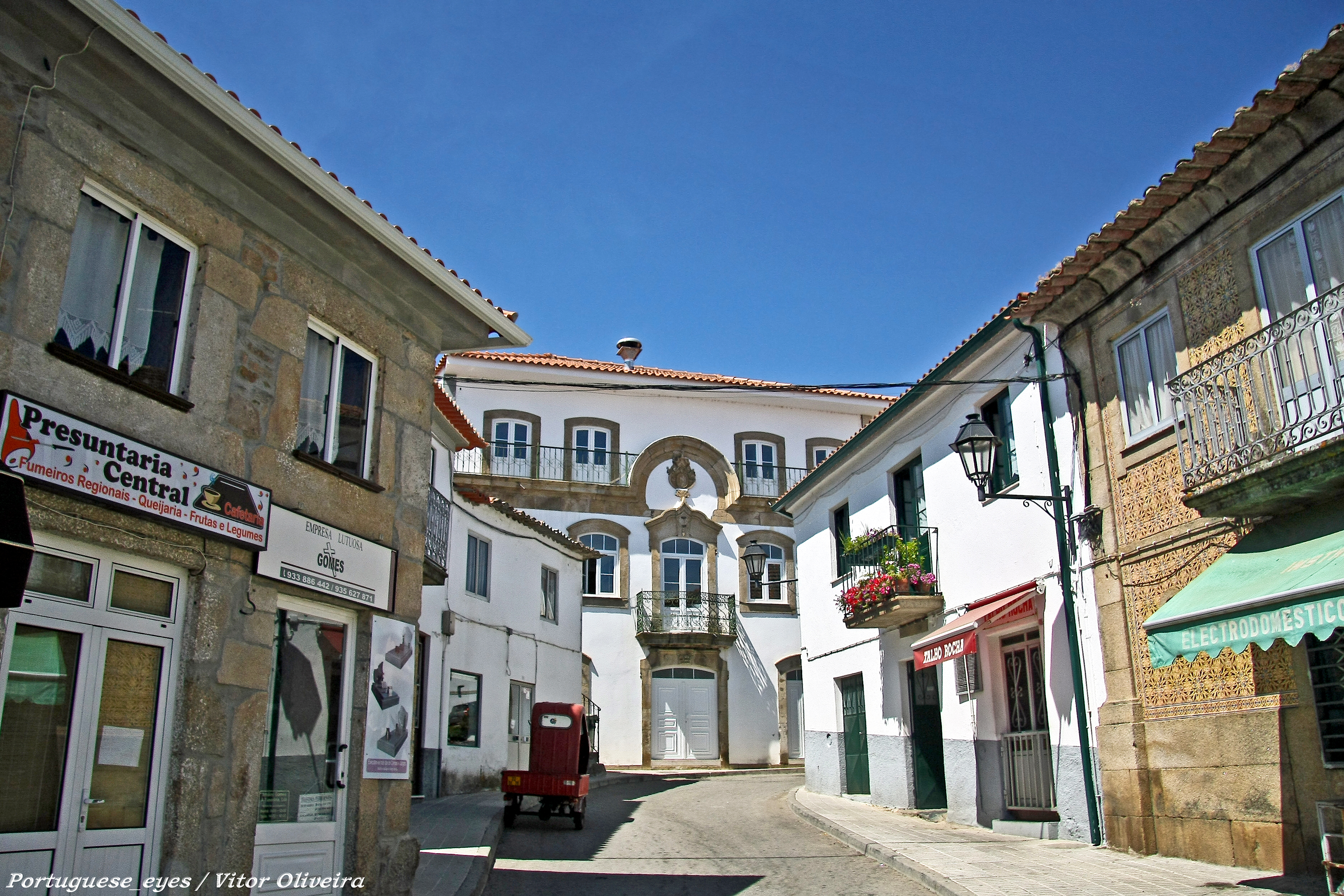
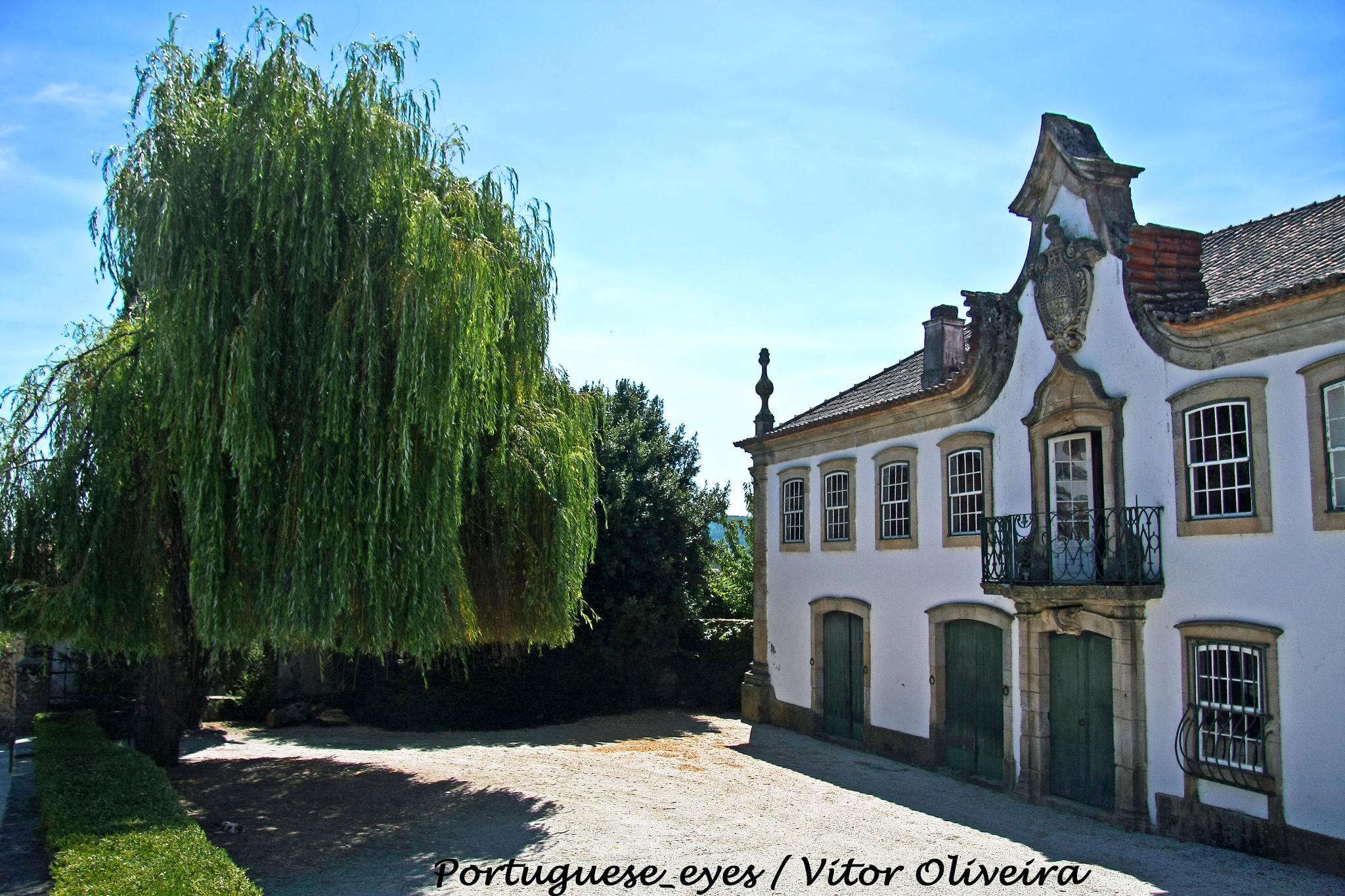

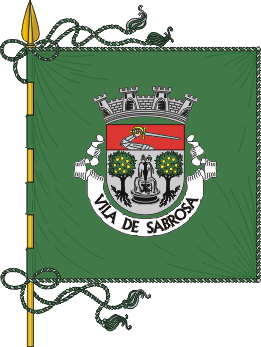
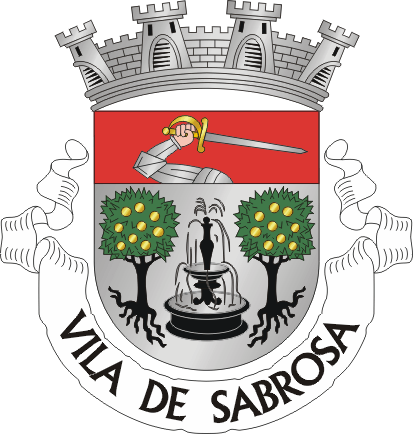
- Flag Coat of arms
- Interactive map of Sabrosa
- Coordinates: 41°17′4″N 7°35′42″W
- Country: Portugal
- Region: Norte
- Intermunic. comm.: Douro
- District: Vila Real
- Parishes: 12

Government
  - President: José Manuel de Carvalho Marques (PS)

Area
  - Total: 156.92 km^{2} (60.59 sq mi)
- Elevation: 544 m (1,785 ft)

Population (2011)
  - Total: 6,361
  - Density: 40.54/km^{2} (105.0/sq mi)
- Time zone: UTC+00:00 (WET)
  - Summer (DST): UTC+01:00 (WEST)
- Postal code: 5060
- Area code: 259
- Website: https://www.cm-sabrosa.pt

Sabrosa (Portuguese pronunciation: [sɐˈβɾɔzɐ]) is a municipality in the district of Vila Real in northern Portugal. The population in 2011 was 6,361, in an area of 156.92 km^{2}.

== History ==
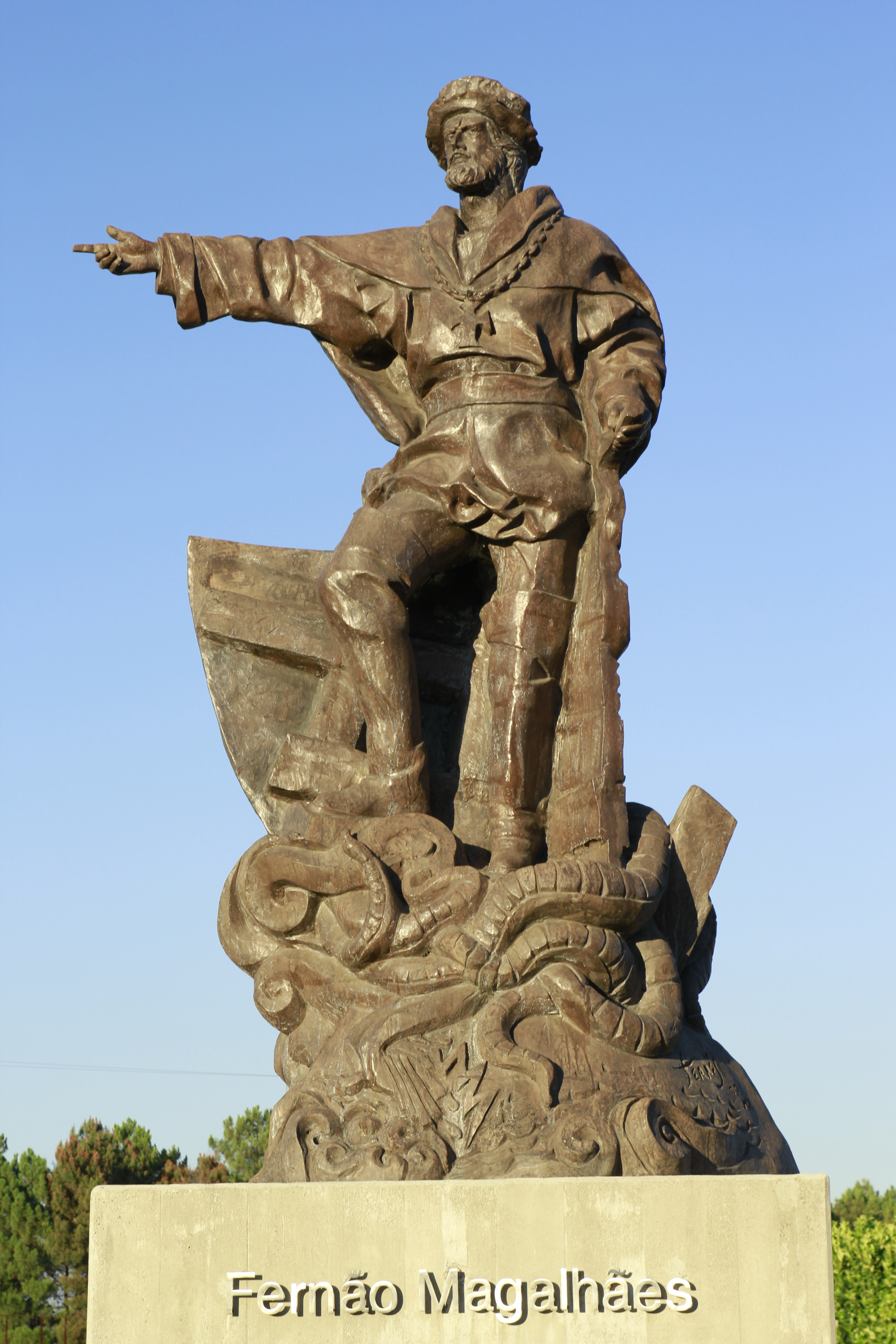
Statue of Ferdinand Magellan, allegedly born in the town around 1480

Although the municipality was established on 6 November 1945, the history of the region extends back to vestiges from different tribes and groups that lived in area, remoting to the pre-historic period. During this period ancient Neolithic tribes constructed dolmen funerary structures, such as the Mamoa 1 de Madorras in the Serra da Padrela (Arcã), a monumental, yet well-preserved tomb.

Also, the Castro culture of the Iron Age resulted in many of these stone fortifications scattered throughout the municipality; castros like the Castro of Sancha, Castelo dos Mouros or Castro de São Domingos de Provesende, are located in sights of good visibility and natural defences, reinforced by the construction of moats and walls. The Castro of Sabrosa was actually adopted by the Romans, who left behind coins and a stone inscription dedicated to Jupiter. A Luso-Roman cemetery was also discovered in the parish of Provesende (in Quinta da Relva), and classified as a patrimony of public interest, but it was destroyed in the 1950s when the land was re-purposed for vineyards.

The majority of the settlements in Sabrosa date back to the Middle Ages, and were formalized in forals bestowed by hereditary heirs of Afonso I of Portugal. Many of these settlements were actually established prior to 1143 (the establishment of the Kingdom of Portugal), such as Provesende, and have scattered paleo-Christian structures from this period, as in the cases of Arcã, Vilar de Celas, Paredes, Provesende and Donelo.

After the 15th century, records from the region began to become more detailed, identifying the residence of noblemen in the region, including the House of Pereira, where locals claim that Ferdinand Magellan (Portuguese: Fernão Magalhães) was born, even though this theory has been debunked as an eighteenth-century forgery. The life of these families were associated with the construction family estates distributed throughout the municipality. The prosperity of the region was due in part to the growth of Demarcated Region of the Douro, and through the exploitation by the Companhia Geral da Agricultura das Vinhas do Alto Douro, which was established by the Marquess of Pombal in 1756. By establishing a special wine region designation for the Douro region, he elevated the importance of the area, creating incentives to improve the production of Douro wines and improve quality exports. With the exception of Parada do Pinhão, São Lourenço de Ribapinhão and Torre do Pinhão all the parishes of Sabrosa fell within the demarcated region.

On 14 December 2001, UNESCO integrated the Alto Douro Vinhateiro on their list of World Heritage sites.

== Geography ==
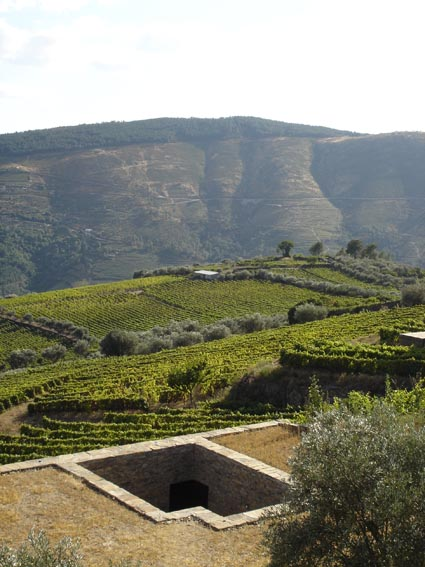
The landscape in the civil parish of Provesende

Population of the Municipality of Sabrosa (1849 - 2004)
Year	Pop.	±%
1849	5,412	—
1900	14,038	+159.4%
1930	12,576	−10.4%
1960	12,903	+2.6%
1981	9,050	−29.9%
1991	7,478	−17.4%
2001	7,032	−6.0%
2011	6,361	−9.5%

The municipality of Sabrosa, with an area of approximately 180 km^{2}, is located in the district of Vila Real, within the Tourist Region of the Serra do Marão. It is delimited in the north by the municipalities of Vila Pouca and Murça, in the east by Alijó, the west by Vila Real and Peso da Régua, and south by Douro River. Its configuration is reminiscent of an elongated tear-drop, oriented north-south.

Sabrosa is a municipality with a geology that has been shaped by ancient forces: in the north, the area is granitic, covered in pines and extraction of aggregates; while the southern portion of the municipality is dominated by schists, promoting the feasibility of vineyards.

Administratively, the municipality is divided into 12 civil parishes (freguesias):

- Celeirós
- Covas do Douro
- Gouvinhas
- Parada de Pinhão
- Paços
- Provesende, Gouvães do Douro e São Cristóvão do Douro
- Sabrosa
- São Lourenço de Ribapinhão
- São Martinho de Antas e Paradela de Guiães
- Souto Maior
- Torre do Pinhão
- Vilarinho de São Romão

== Culture ==
The municipality is known for its embroidery, tanneries, basket-weaving, carpentry and cheesemaking.

Sabrosa, which falls in the Trás-os-Montes culture, has many examples of traditional gastronomy, which includes oven-brazed goat in rice (Portuguese: Cabrito assado com arroz de forno), the Cozido à portuguesa, the bola de carne (English: ball of meat), the typical embutidos, pão-de-ló, cavacas altas and cavaquinhas, in addition to the rich tradition of Douro and Porto wines.

== Notable citizens ==
- Antonio Luís Álvares Pereira Coelho da Silva Castelo-Branco e Magalhães (1751 — 1802), aristocrat who forged documents to present himself as Ferdinand Magellan's heir and Sabrosa as the explorer's birthplace.
- Joaquim Pinheiro de Azevedo Leite Pereira, (PT Wiki) (Provesende, 1829 — 1918) a Douro winemaker, who saved the vineyards of the region from the phylloxera disease;
- Mariana Coelho (1857-1954), a Portuguese Brazilian educator, essayist, poet and feminist pioneer in Brazil.
- António Teixeira de Sousa (1857 in Celeirós – 1917) a medical doctor, politician & 54th Prime Minister of Portugal in 1910.
- Adolfo Correia Rocha, known as Miguel Torga, (São Martinho de Anta, 1907 – Coimbra, 1995), a distinguished poet, dramatist, essayist, whose works have been widely translated;
- José Loureiro dos Santos, (PT Wiki) (1936 - 2018), a military General, politician and writer;
- Jaime Alberto Gonçalves das Neves, (PT Wiki) (São Martinho de Anta, 1936 - 2013), a colonel, used moderating contributions during the Carnation Revolution and for subsequent return to military normalcy;
- Albertina Machado (born 1961) a long-distance runner, competed in the marathon at the 1996 Summer Olympics
- Vítor Alves (born 1985) a Portuguese footballer with over 330 club caps.

== Sister city ==
- Cebu City, Philippines
- Puerto San Julián, Argentina.
