= 2016–17 G.D. Chaves season =

Chaves
2016–17 season
- President: Bruno Carvalho
- Manager: Jorge Simão (July 2016 – December 2016); Carlos Pires (December 2016); Ricardo Soares (December 2016– May 2017)
- Stadium: Estádio Municipal Eng. Manuel Branco Teixeira
- Primeira Liga: 11th
- Taça de Portugal: Semi-finals
- Taça da Liga: Second round
- Top goalscorer: League: Fábio Martins (6); All: Fábio Martins (8)
- Highest home attendance: 8,000; Chaves 0–2 Benfica (24 September 2016)
- Lowest home attendance: 1,730; Chaves 2–0 Nacional (26 January 2017)
- Average home league attendance: 3,555
Home colours	Away colours
- All statistics correct as of 21 May 2017.

The 2016–17 season is Chaves' fourteenth season in the top flight of Portuguese football. This marked Chaves' return to the Portuguese top tier, after a seventeen-year absence.

== Squad ==
Note: Flags indicate national team as defined under FIFA eligibility rules; some limited exceptions apply. Players may hold more than one non-FIFA nationality.

No.	Pos.	Nation	Player
1	GK	POR	António Filipe
2	DF	POR	Paulinho
3	MF	MNE	Simon Vukčević
4	DF	POR	Fábio Santos
5	DF	SRB	Nemanja Petrović
6	MF	BRA	Rafael Assis
7	FW	GNB	João Mário
8	MF	POR	João Patrão
9	FW	POR	Rafael Lopes
10	FW	BRA	Perdigão
11	MF	BRA	Luís Alberto
12	MF	BLR	Bressan
13	GK	POR	Ricardo Nunes
14	DF	POR	Nuno André Coelho
15	MF	POR	Pedro Tiba
16	MF	ARG	Rodrigo Battaglia
17	FW	LBY	Hamdou Elhouni

No.	Pos.	Nation	Player
18	FW	SEN	Alioune Fall
20	DF	BRA	Rodrigo
21	DF	POR	Nélson Lenho
22	DF	CPV	Félix Mathaus
23	GK	POR	Emanuel Novo
24	DF	POR	Pedro Queirós
25	MF	POR	Braga
26	MF	CPV	Carlos Ponck
29	FW	BRA	Rafael Batatinha
31	FW	BRA	Gustavo Souza
33	DF	BRA	Felipe Lopes
44	DF	BRA	Freire
47	FW	POR	Fábio Martins
91	FW	BRA	Davidson
92	DF	BRA	Victor Massaia
99	FW	BRA	William

== Transfers ==
=== In ===
Pos.	Player	Signed from	Details	Date	Source
DF	(Portugal) Pedro Queirós	(Romania) Astra Giurgiu	Free Transfer	1 June 2016	
GK	(Portugal) Emanuel Novo	(Portugal) Famalicão	Undisclosed	1 June 2016	
DF	(Guinea-Bissau) Lamine Bá	(Portugal) Mirandela	Loan Return	1 June 2016	
MF	(Senegal) Latyr Fall	(Portugal) Mirandela	Loan Return	1 June 2016	
FW	(Portugal) Rafa Lopes	(Portugal) Académica	Free Transfer	20 June 2016	
MF	(Montenegro) Simon Vukčević	(Cyprus) Enosis Neon Paralimni	Undisclosed	22 June 2016	
MF	(Brazil) Luís Alberto	(Portugal) Tondela	Free Transfer	30 June 2016	
FW	(Senegal) Alioune Fall	(Portugal) Vizela	Loan Return	30 June 2016	
GK	(Portugal) Ricardo	(Portugal) FC Porto	Loan	1 July 2016	
DF	(Brazil) Freire	(Cyprus) Apollon Limassol	Free Transfer	3 July 2016	
DF	(Brazil) Felipe Lopes	(Germany) Wolfsburg	Free Transfer	4 July 2016	
FW	(Portugal) Fábio Martins	(Portugal) Braga	Loan	8 July 2016	
DF	(Serbia) Nemanja Petrović	(Serbia) Partizan	Free Transfer	8 July 2016	
MF	(Angola) Pana	(Portugal) Marítimo	Free Transfer	8 July 2016	
MF	(Portugal) Francisco Ramos	(Portugal) FC Porto	Loan	11 July 2016	
DF	(Portugal) Paulinho	(Portugal) União da Madeira	Free Transfer	15 July 2016	
FW	(Libya) Hamdou Elhouni	(Portugal) Benfica	Loan	19 July 2016	
MF	(Portugal) Rodrigo Battaglia	(Portugal) Braga	Loan	27 July 2016	
DF	(Cape Verde) Félix Mathaus	(Portugal) Académico de Viseu	Trade	3 August 2016	
FW	(Brazil) William	(Turkey) Kayserispor	Undisclosed	3 August 2016	
DF	(Cape Verde) Carlos Ponck	(Portugal) Benfica	Loan	31 August 2016	
FW	(Brazil) Rafael Batatinha	(Portugal) Santa Clara	€50,000	27 December 2016	
MF	(Brazil) Davidson	(Portugal) Sporting da Covilhã	Undisclosed	3 January 2017	
FW	(Portugal) José Xavier	(Portugal) Vitória de Guimarães	Undisclosed	10 January 2017	
MF	(Belarus) Bressan	(Cyprus) APOEL FC	Free Transfer	12 January 2017	
DF	(Portugal) Nuno André Coelho	(United States) Sporting Kansas City	Free Transfer	21 January 2017	
MF	(Portugal) Pedro Tiba	(Portugal) Braga	Loan	26 January 2017	
DF	(Brazil) Victor Massaia	(Portugal) Santa Clara	Undisclosed	30 January 2017	
DF	(Brazil) Rodrigo	(Portugal) FC Porto	Loan	30 January 2017	

=== Out ===
Pos.	Player	Signed by	Details	Date	Source
DF	(Portugal) Edu Machado	(Portugal) Boavista	Free Transfer	26 May 2016	
MF	(Portugal) João Reis	(Portugal) Santa Clara	Free Transfer	11 June 2016	
MF	(Portugal) Miguel Ângelo	(Portugal) Cova da Piedade	Free Transfer	30 June 2016	
MF	(Ivory Coast) Siaka Bamba	(Portugal) Cova da Piedade	Free Transfer	1 July 2016	
MF	(Portugal) Paulo Ribeiro	(Portugal) Vizela	Free Transfer	1 July 2016	
MF	(Portugal) Luís Silva	(Portugal) Nacional	Free Transfer	1 July 2016	
FW	(Portugal) Luís Pinto	(Portugal) S.C. Covilhã	Free Transfer	5 July 2016	
FW	(Portugal) Luís Barry	(Portugal) Mirandela	Free Transfer	6 July 2016	
FW	(Portugal) Diogo Cunha	(Portugal) Famalicão	Free Transfer	6 July 2016	
DF	(France) Mike Moura	(Portugal) Sporting da Covilhã	Free Transfer	8 July 2016	
FW	(Brazil) Sandro Lima	(Brazil) Anápolis	End of Loan	20 July 2016	
MF	(Portugal) Bruno Magalhães	(Portugal) C.D. Aves	Free Transfer	22 July 2016	
DF	(Burkina Faso) Stéphane Dasse	(Portugal) Académico de Viseu	Free Transfer	22 July 2016	
MF	(Portugal) André Fontes	(Portugal) Penafiel	Free Transfer	23 July 2016	
DF	(Portugal) Diogo Coelho	(Portugal) Nacional	End of Loan	30 June 2016	
FW	(Portugal) Tozé Marreco	(Belgium) Excel Mouscron	End of Loan	30 June 2016	
DF	(Guinea-Bissau) Lamine Bá	(Portugal) Oliveirense	Loan	1 August 2016	
MF	(Angola) Pana	(Portugal) Académico de Viseu	Loan	3 August 2016	
MF	(Senegal) Latyr Fall	(Portugal) Vilaverdense	Loan	3 August 2016	
DF	(Portugal) Miguel Oliveira	(Portugal) Vizela	Free Transfer	9 August 2016	
MF	(Portugal) Francisco Ramos	(Portugal) FC Porto	End of Loan	31 August 2016	
MF	(Argentina) Rodrigo Battaglia	(Portugal) Braga	End of Loan	23 December 2016	
MF	(Brazil) Luís Alberto	(Portugal) CD Aves	Rescind Contract	27 December 2016	
DF	(Portugal) Paulinho	(Portugal) Braga	€350,000	10 January 2016	
FW	(Portugal) José Xavier	(Portugal) Juventude de Pedras Salgadas	Loan	10 January 2017	
FW	(Brazil) Gustavo Souza	(Portugal) Juventude de Pedras Salgadas	Loan	12 January 2017	
MF	(Brazil) Rafael Assis	(Portugal) Braga	€1,000,000	26 January 2016	
DF	(Cape Verde) Félix Mathaus	(Portugal) Freamunde	Loan	26 January 2017	
DF	(Brazil) Freire	(Japan) Shimizu S-Pulse	€500,000	6 February 2017	
MF	(Montenegro) Simon Vukčević	Free Agent	Rescind Contract	4 May 2017	

== Pre-season and friendlies ==
Win Draw Loss

9 July 2016 Friendly	Chaves (Portugal)	6–0	(Portugal) Rebordelo	Vila Pouca de Aguiar, Portugal
10:30 WEST (UTC+01:00)				Stadium: Complexo Desportivo de Vila Pouca de Aguiar

13 July 2016 Friendly	Famalicão (Portugal)	1–0	(Portugal) Chaves	Melgaço, Portugal
18:00 WEST (UTC+01:00)	Torres 76'			Stadium: Centro Desportivo de Melgaço

16 July 2016 Torneio Centenário do Varzim	Chaves (Portugal)	0–0 (9–10 p)	(Portugal) Vitória de Guimarães	Póvoa de Varzim, Portugal
17:00 WEST (UTC+01:00)				Stadium: Estádio do Varzim SC

17 July 2016 Torneio Centenário do Varzim	Varzim (Portugal)	2–2 (5–3 p)	(Portugal) Chaves	Póvoa de Varzim, Portugal
17:00 WEST (UTC+01:00)	Romário 53' (pen.), 80' (pen.)	Report	Fall 7'; Freire 90+2'	Stadium: Estádio do Varzim SC

20 July 2016 Friendly	Chaves (Portugal)	1–1	(Portugal) Vitória de Guimarães	Vila Pouca de Aguiar, Portugal
18:00 WEST (UTC+01:00)	João Patrão 7'	Report	Areias 88'	Stadium: Complexo Desportivo de Vila Pouca de Aguiar

23 July 2016 Friendly	Vitória de Guimarães B (Portugal)	0–1	(Portugal) Chaves	Guimarães, Portugal
10:30 WEST (UTC+01:00)			Fall 77'	Stadium: Complexo Desportivo Dr. António Pimenta Machado

28 July 2016 Friendly	Chaves (Portugal)	1–1	(Portugal) Marítimo	Gondomar, Portugal
17:00 WEST (UTC+01:00)	Fábio Martins 15'	Report	Ghazaryan 88'	Stadium: Estádio de São Miguel

30 July 2016 Friendly	Chaves (Portugal)	0–0	(Portugal) Braga B	Póvoa de Varzim, Portugal
10:30 WEST (UTC+01:00)				Stadium: Estádio Municipal da Póvoa de Varzim

30 July 2016 Friendly	Montalegre (Portugal)	1–3	(Portugal) Chaves	Montalegre, Portugal
18:00 WEST (UTC+01:00)	Zach 66'	Report	Rafa Lopes 10'; João Mário 61'; Braga 90'	Stadium: Estádio Dr. Diogo Alves Vaz Pereira

3 August 2016 Torneo Internacional Eurocidade Chaves-Verín	Verín (Spain)	0–2 (4–5 p)	(Portugal) Chaves	Verín, Spain
19:00 CEST (UTC+02:00)		Report	Vukčević 20'; Rafael Assis 28'	Stadium: Campo de Fútbol José Arjiz

3 August 2016 Torneo Internacional Eurocidade Chaves-Verín	Deportivo de La Coruña (Spain)	0–1	(Portugal) Chaves	Verín, Spain
20:00 CEST (UTC+02:00)		Report	Braga 18'	Stadium: Campo de Fútbol José Arjiz

6 August 2016 Presentation	Chaves (Portugal)	3–0	(Portugal) Pedras Salgadas	Chaves, Portugal
18:00 WEST (UTC+01:00)	João Patrão 5'; Rafa Lopes 40'; Luís Alberto 88'			Stadium: Estádio Municipal Eng. Manuel Branco Teixeira

7 August 2016 Friendly	Mirandela (Portugal)	0–2	(Portugal) Chaves	Mirandela, Portugal
16:00 WEST (UTC+01:00)		Report	Fall (pen.); Fábio Martins	Stadium: Estádio de São Sebastião

== Competitions ==
=== Overall record ===
As of match played on 21 May 2017

Performance by competition
Competition	Starting round	Final position/round	First match	Last match
Primeira Liga	—N/a	11th	20 August 2016	21 May 2017
Taça de Portugal	Third round	Semi-finals	16 October 2016	4 April 2017
Taça da Liga	Second round	Second round	27 October 2016	27 October 2016

Statistics by competition
Competition	Pld	W	D	L	GF	GA	GD	Win%
Primeira Liga	34	8	14	12	34	42	−8	23.53
Taça de Portugal	6	4	1	1	8	5	+3	66.67
Taça da Liga	1	0	1	0	1	1	+0	0.00
Total	41	12	16	13	44	48	−4	29.27

=== Primeira Liga ===
==== League table ====
Pos	Team	Pld	W	D	L	GF	GA	GD	Pts
9	Boavista	34	10	13	11	33	36	−3	43
10	Estoril	34	10	8	16	36	42	−6	38 (Note: Estoril is ahead of Chaves and Vitória de Setúbal on head-to-head points: Estoril 6 pts, Chaves 5 pts, Vitória de Setúbal 5 pts. Chaves is ahead of Vitória de Setúbal on head-to-head goal difference.)
11	Chaves	34	8	14	12	35	42	−7	38
12	Vitória de Setúbal	34	10	8	16	30	39	−9	38
13	Paços de Ferreira	34	8	12	14	32	45	−13	36 (Note: Paços de Ferreira is ahead of Belenenses on head-to-head points: Paços de Ferreira 1–0 Belenenses, Belenenses 1–2 Paços de Ferreira.)

Source: Liga Portugal
Rules for classification: 1) Points; 2) Head-to-head points; 3) Head-to-head goal difference; 4) Head-to-head away goals scored; 5) Goal difference; 6) Matches won; 7) Goals scored; 8) Play-off.
(Note: The LPFP decided that only criteria 1, 5, 6 and 7 would be applied to establish the classification during the competition.)

==== Results by round ====
Round	1	2	3	4	5	6	7	8	9	10	11	12	13	14	15	16	17	18	19	20	21	22	23	24	25	26	27	28	29	30	31	32	33	34
Ground	A	H	A	H	A	H	H	A	H	A	H	A	H	A	H	A	H	H	A	H	A	H	A	A	H	A	H	A	H	A	H	A	H	A
Result	W	D	D	D	W	L	W	L	D	D	D	D	W	L	W	D	D	W	L	D	D	W	L	L	D	L	W	L	L	D	L	L	D	L
Position	8	11	8	8	6	8	5	6	6	6	6	8	7	8	7	7	7	6	8	7	7	7	7	8	8	9	8	8	8	8	10	10	10	11

Updated to match(es) played on 21 May 2017. Source: [[[Category:All articles with unsourced statements]]
A = Away; H = Home; W = Win; D = Draw; L = Loss

==== Matches ====
20 August 2016 2	Chaves	1–1	Tondela	Chaves
16:00 WEST (UTC+01:00)	João Mário 29'	Report	Murillo 81'	Stadium: Estádio Municipal Eng. Manuel Branco Teixeira; Attendance: 4,574; Referee: Rui Costa

28 August 2016 3	Boavista	2–2	Chaves	Porto
16:00 WEST (UTC+01:00)	Schembri 36'; Espinho 74' (pen.)	Report	Hamdou Elhouni 72'; Perdigão 83'	Stadium: Estádio do Bessa; Attendance: 5,021; Referee: Luís Godinho

4 September 2016 (Note: The match was originally to be played on 14 August 2016 but it was postponed because of several fires burning in Madeira, including in Funchal.) 1	Nacional	0–1	Chaves	Funchal, Madeira
16:00 WEST (UTC+01:00)		Report	Braga 18'	Stadium: Estádio da Madeira; Attendance: 1,705; Referee: Tiago Martins

11 September 2016 4	Chaves	0–0	Vitória de Setúbal	Chaves
20:15 WEST (UTC+01:00)		Report		Stadium: Estádio Municipal Eng. Manuel Branco Teixeira; Attendance: 1,885; Referee: Tiago Antunes

18 September 2016 5	Arouca	0–1	Chaves	Arouca
16:00 WEST (UTC+01:00)		Report	Perdigão 44'	Stadium: Estádio Municipal de Arouca; Attendance: 740; Referee: Luís Ferreira

24 September 2016 6	Chaves	0–2	Benfica	Chaves
18:15 WEST (UTC+01:00)		Report	Mitroglou 69'; Pizzi 84'	Stadium: Estádio Municipal Eng. Manuel Branco Teixeira; Attendance: 8,000; Referee: Tiago Martins

1 October 2016 7	Chaves	3–1	Belenenses	Chaves
16:00 WEST (UTC+01:00)	Braga 75' (pen.); Battaglia 83'; William 85'	Report	Domingos Duarte 30'	Stadium: Estádio Municipal Eng. Manuel Branco Teixeira; Attendance: 2,268; Referee: Fábio Veríssimo

24 October 2016 8	Braga	1–0	Chaves	Braga
20:00 WEST (UTC+01:00)	Pedro Santos 56' (pen.)	Report		Stadium: Estádio Municipal de Braga; Attendance: 9,058; Referee: Bruno Paixão

31 October 2016 9	Chaves	1–1	Feirense	Chaves
20:00 WET (UTC±00:00)	Battaglia 71'	Report	Karamanos 45'	Stadium: Estádio Municipal Eng. Manuel Branco Teixeira; Attendance: 3,053; Referee: Manuel Oliveira

5 November 2016 10	Paços de Ferreira	1–1	Chaves	Paços de Ferreira
16:00 WET (UTC±00:00)	Pedrinho 80'	Report	Battaglia 55'	Stadium: Estádio Capital do Móvel; Attendance: 2,794; Referee: Hugo Miguel

26 November 2016 11	Chaves	0–0	Marítimo	Chaves
11:45 WET (UTC±00:00)		Report		Stadium: Estádio Municipal Eng. Manuel Branco Teixeira; Attendance: 2,431; Referee: João Pinheiro

4 December 2016 12	Vitória de Guimarães	1–1	Chaves	Guimarães
20:15 WET (UTC±00:00)	Hernâni 3'	Report	João Patrão 83'	Stadium: Estádio D. Afonso Henriques; Attendance: 14,877; Referee: Bruno Esteves

10 December 2016 13	Chaves	2–1	Moreirense	Chaves
18:15 WET (UTC±00:00)	William 16'; Rafa Lopes 90+2'	Report	Boateng 33'	Stadium: Estádio Municipal Eng. Manuel Branco Teixeira; Attendance: 2,184; Referee: Artur Soares Dias

19 December 2016 14	Porto	2–1	Chaves	Porto
20:00 WET (UTC±00:00)	Depoitre 72'; Danilo 77'	Report	Rafa Lopes 12'	Stadium: Estádio do Dragão; Attendance: 35,210; Referee: Vasco Santos

22 December 2016 15	Chaves	1–0	Estoril	Chaves
21:00 WET (UTC±00:00)	Fábio Martins 68'	Report		Stadium: Estádio Municipal Eng. Manuel Branco Teixeira; Attendance: 2,457; Referee: Jorge Sousa

8 January 2017 16	Rio Ave	2–2	Chaves	Vila do Conde
16:00 WET (UTC±00:00)	Tarantini 18'; Hélder Guedes 80'	Report	Fábio Martins 54'; Rafa Lopes 75'	Stadium: Estádio dos Arcos; Attendance: 2,908; Referee: João Pinheiro

14 January 2017 17	Chaves	2–2	Sporting CP	Chaves
18:15 WET (UTC±00:00)	Rafa Lopes 4'; Fábio Martins 87'	Report	Dost 45+1', 74'	Stadium: Estádio Municipal Eng. Manuel Branco Teixeira; Attendance: 6,964; Referee: Nuno Almeida

23 January 2017 18	Chaves	2–0	Nacional	Chaves
20:00 WET (UTC±00:00)	Braga 30'; Davidson 45'	Report		Stadium: Estádio Municipal Eng. Manuel Branco Teixeira; Attendance: 1,730; Referee: Tiago Antunes

28 January 2017 19	Tondela	2-0	Chaves	Tondela
11:45 WET (UTC±00:00)	Yordan Osorio 22'; Heliardo 45'	Report		Stadium: Estádio João Cardoso; Attendance: 1,045; Referee: João Matos

4 February 2017 20	Chaves	0-0	Boavista	Chaves
16:00 WET (UTC±00:00)		Report		Stadium: Estádio Municipal Eng. Manuel Branco Teixeira; Attendance: 2,276; Referee: Carlos Xistra

11 February 2017 21	Vitória de Setúbal	0-0	Chaves	Setúbal
16:00 WET (UTC±00:00)		Report		Stadium: Estádio do Bonfim; Attendance: 2,746; Referee: Fábio Veríssimo

18 February 2017 22	Chaves	2-0	Arouca	Chaves
16:00 WET (UTC±00:00)	Bressan 9'; Fábio Martins 80'	Report		Stadium: Estádio Municipal Eng. Manuel Branco Teixeira; Attendance: 2,480; Referee: Luís Godinho

24 February 2017 23	Benfica	3-1	Chaves	Lisbon
20:30 WET (UTC±00:00)	Mitroglou 17' 89'; Rafa Silva 50'	Report	Bressan 44'	Stadium: Estádio da Luz; Attendance: 53,810; Referee: Nuno Almeida

5 March 2017 24	Belenenses	2-1	Chaves	Lisbon
18:00 WET (UTC±00:00)	Maurides 71'; Tiago Caeiro 90+1'	Report	Pedro Tiba 45'	Stadium: Estádio do Restelo; Attendance: 4,719; Referee: Manuel Mota

11 March 2017 25	Chaves	0-0	Braga	Chaves
18:15 WET (UTC±00:00)		Report		Stadium: Estádio Municipal Eng. Manuel Branco Teixeira; Attendance: 4,640; Referee: Vasco Santos

19 March 2017 26	Feirense	3-2	Chaves	Santa Maria da Feira
16:00 WET (UTC±00:00)	Tiago Silva 54'; Luís Machado 56'; Etebo 81'	Report	Bressan 44'; Fábio Martins 49'	Stadium: Estádio Marcolino de Castro; Attendance: 4,695; Referee: Gonçalo Martins

2 April 2017 27	Chaves	1-0	Paços de Ferreira	Chaves
19:00 WEST (UTC+01:00)	Gegé 41' (o.g.)	Report		Stadium: Estádio Municipal Eng. Manuel Branco Teixeira; Attendance: 2,558; Referee: João Matos

10 April 2017 28	Marítimo	2-1	Chaves	Funchal, Madeira
20:00 WEST (UTC+01:00)	Keita 37'; António Xavier 84'	Report	Perdigão 56'	Stadium: Estádio do Marítimo; Attendance: 8,361; Referee: Rui Oliveira

15 April 2017 29	Chaves	2-3	Vitória de Guimarães	Chaves
16:00 WEST (UTC+01:00)	Rafa Lopes 75'; William 77'	Report	David Texeira 11'; Hernâni 14'; Paolo Hurtado 35'	Stadium: Estádio Municipal Eng. Manuel Branco Teixeira; Attendance: 5,145; Referee: Artur Soares Dias

24 April 2017 30	Moreirense	0-0	Chaves	Moreira de Cónegos
20:00 WEST (UTC+01:00)		Report		Stadium: Parque Joaquim de Almeida Freitas; Attendance: 2,767; Referee: Hugo Miguel

29 April 2017 31	Chaves	0-2	Porto	Chaves
20:30 WEST (UTC+01:00)		Report	Soares 52'; André André 72'	Stadium: Estádio Municipal Eng. Manuel Branco Teixeira; Attendance: 6,550; Referee: Carlos Xistra

8 May 2017 32	Estoril	2-1	Chaves	Estoril
20:00 WEST (UTC+01:00)	André Claro 72'; Mattheus 87'	Report	Bressan 23'	Stadium: Estádio António Coimbra da Mota; Attendance: 1,609; Referee: Antonio Coimbra da Mota

14 May 2017 33	Chaves	2-2	Rio Ave	Chaves
16:00 WEST (UTC+01:00)	Fábio Martins 7'; Pedro Tiba 68'	Report	Hélder Guedes 58'; Tarantini 90+1'	Stadium: Estádio Municipal Eng. Manuel Branco Teixeira; Attendance: 2,356; Referee: Bruno Paixão

21 May 2017 34	Sporting CP	4-1	Chaves	Lisbon
20:15 WEST (UTC+01:00)	Bas Dost 11' (pen.), 15', 90+1' (pen.); Adrien Silva 30'	Report	William 60'	Stadium: Estádio José Alvalade; Attendance: 32,457; Referee: Jorge Ferreira

=== Taça de Portugal ===
==== Third round ====
16 October 2016	União da Madeira	0–1	Chaves	Ribeira Brava, Madeira
15:00 WEST (UTC+01:00)			Perdigão 61'	Stadium: Centro Desportivo da Madeira; Attendance: 198; Referee: Hugo Miguel

==== Fourth round ====
18 November 2016	Chaves	0–0 (a.e.t.) (3–2 p)	Porto	Chaves
20:15 WET (UTC±00:00)				Stadium: Estádio Municipal Eng. Manuel Branco Teixeira; Attendance: 7,900; Referee: João Capela
	Penalties
	Braga (penalty missed); Battaglia (penalty scored); Patrão (penalty scored); Felipe Lopes (penalty missed); Freire (penalty scored)		(penalty scored) Evandro; (penalty missed) Layún; (penalty scored) Telles; (penalty missed) Depoitre; (penalty missed) André Silva

==== Fifth round ====
14 December 2016	Torreense	2–3	Chaves	Torres Vedras
15:00 WET (UTC±00:00)	Bonifácio 34'; Freire 90' (o.g.)		Perdigão 44'; Fábio Martins 58'; Battaglia 90+9' (pen.)	Stadium: Estádio Manuel Marques; Attendance: 2,000; Referee: Tiago Martins

==== Quarter-finals ====
17 January 2017	Chaves	1–0	Sporting CP	Chaves
20:15 WET (UTC±00:00)	Carlos Ponck 87'			Stadium: Estádio Municipal Eng. Manuel Branco Teixeira; Attendance: 5,320; Referee: Artur Soares Dias

==== Semi-finals ====
1 March 2017 1st leg	Vitória de Guimarães	2-0	Chaves	Guimarães
20:15 WET (UTC±00:00)	Hernâni 10' 77'			Stadium: Estádio D. Afonso Henriques; Attendance: 10,088; Referee: Bruno Esteves

4 April 2017 2nd leg	Chaves	3-1 (3-3 agg.)	Vitória de Guimarães	Chaves
20:15 WEST (UTC+01:00)	Perdigão 1'; Bressan 33'; Nuno André Coelho 63'		Marega 65'	Stadium: Estádio Municipal Eng. Manuel Branco Teixeira; Attendance: 7,730; Referee: Fábio Verissimo

=== Taça da Liga ===
==== Second round ====
27 October 2016	Rio Ave	1–1 (3–1 p)	Chaves	Vila do Conde
18:30 WEST (UTC+01:00)	Ronan 82'	Report	Fábio Martins 43'	Stadium: Estádio dos Arcos; Attendance: 932; Referee: Rui Oliveira
	Penalties
	Novais (penalty scored); Pedrinho (penalty missed); Monte (penalty scored); Ronan (penalty scored)		(penalty missed) Battaglia; (penalty missed) Rafa Lopes; (penalty missed) Luís Alberto; (penalty scored) Hamdou Elhouni

== Player statistics ==
No.	Pos	Nat	Player	Total		Primeira Liga		Taça de Portugal		Taça da Liga	
No.	Pos	Nat	Player	Apps	Goals	Apps	Goals	Apps	Goals	Apps	Goals
Goalkeepers
1	GK	(Portugal) POR	António Filipe	17	0	10	0	6	0	1	0
13	GK	(Portugal) POR	Ricardo Nunes	24	0	24	0	0	0	0	0
23	GK	(Portugal) POR	Emanuel Novo	1	0	1	0	0	0	0	0
Defenders
4	DF	(Portugal) POR	Fábio Santos	7	0	6	0	1	0	0	0
5	DF	(Serbia) SRB	Nemanja Petrović	2	0	1	0	0	0	1	0
14	DF	(Portugal) POR	Nuno André Coelho	15	1	13	0	2	1	0	0
20	DF	(Brazil) BRA	Rodrigo	8	0	7	0	1	0	0	0
21	DF	(Portugal) POR	Nélson Lenho	40	0	34	0	6	0	0	0
24	DF	(Portugal) POR	Pedro Queirós	17	0	14	0	2	0	1	0
26	DF	(Cape Verde) CPV	Carlos Ponck	34	1	27	0	6	1	1	0
33	DF	(Brazil) BRA	Felipe	7	0	6	0	1	0	0	0
92	DF	(Brazil) BRA	Victor Massaia	9	0	9	0	0	0	0	0
Midfielders
8	MF	(Portugal) POR	João Patrão	22	1	19	1	3	0	0	0
12	MF	(Belarus) BLR	Bressan	18	5	15	4	3	1	0	0
15	MF	(Portugal) POR	Pedro Tiba	16	2	14	2	2	0	0	0
25	MF	(Portugal) POR	Braga	38	3	32	3	6	0	0	0
Forwards
7	FW	(Guinea-Bissau) GNB	João Mário	10	1	9	1	0	0	1	0
9	FW	(Portugal) POR	Rafa Lopes	35	5	29	5	5	0	1	0
10	FW	(Brazil) BRA	Perdigão	37	6	31	3	6	3	0	0
17	FW	(Libya) LBY	Hamdou Elhouni	15	1	12	1	2	0	1	0
18	FW	(Senegal) SEN	Alioune Fall	9	0	7	0	1	0	1	0
29	FW	(Brazil) BRA	Rafael Batatinha	13	0	10	0	3	0	0	0
47	FW	(Portugal) POR	Fábio Martins	36	8	29	6	6	1	1	1
91	FW	(Brazil) BRA	Davidson	18	1	15	1	3	0	0	0
99	FW	(Brazil) BRA	William	28	4	23	4	4	0	1	0
Players transferred out during the season
2	DF	(Portugal) POR	Paulinho	17	0	14	0	3	0	0	0
3	MF	(Montenegro) MNE	Simon Vukčević	12	0	11	0	0	0	1	0
44	DF	(Brazil) BRA	Freire	22	0	18	0	4	0	0	0
6	MF	(Brazil) BRA	Rafael Assis	21	0	17	0	4	0	0	0
11	MF	(Brazil) BRA	Luís Alberto	2	0	1	0	0	0	1	0
16	MF	(Argentina) ARG	Rodrigo Battaglia	18	4	14	3	3	1	1	0
22	DF	(Cape Verde) CPV	Félix Mathaus	1	0	0	0	0	0	1	0
31	FW	(Brazil) BRA	Gustavo Souza	0	0	0	0	0	0	0	0

Last updated: 21 May 2017
