= 2017–18 G.D. Chaves season =

Chaves
2017–18 season
- President: Bruno Miguel Esteves Carvalho
- Manager: Luís Castro
- Stadium: Estádio Municipal Eng. Manuel Branco Teixeira
- Primeira Liga: 6th
- Taça de Portugal: Fourth round
- Taça da Liga: Second round
- Top goalscorer: League: William (11); All: William (11)
- Highest home attendance: 8,480; Chaves 0–1 Benfica (14 August 2017)
- Lowest home attendance: 2,076; Chaves 4-2 Vitória de Setúbal (31 January 2018)
Home colours	Away colours	Third colours
- All statistics correct as of 11 May 2018.

The 2017–18 season is Chaves' fifteenth season in the top flight of Portuguese football.

== Squad ==
Note: Flags indicate national team as defined under FIFA eligibility rules; some limited exceptions apply. Players may hold more than one non-FIFA nationality.

No.	Pos.	Nation	Player
1	GK	POR	António Filipe
2	DF	POR	Paulinho
4	DF	BRA	Anderson Conceição
5	MF	POR	Filipe Melo
6	MF	BRA	Jefferson
7	FW	LBY	Hamdou Elhouni
8	MF	POR	João Patrão
9	FW	COL	Wilmar Jordán
10	FW	BRA	Perdigão
11	FW	BRA	William
12	MF	BLR	Renan Bressan
13	GK	POR	Ricardo
14	DF	POR	Nuno André Coelho
15	DF	POR	Domingos Duarte

No.	Pos.	Nation	Player
19	DF	SRB	Nikola Maraš
20	MF	BRA	Tiago Galvão
21	FW	GNB	Jorginho
23	GK	POR	Emanuel Novo
24	DF	POR	Pedro Queirós
25	MF	POR	Pedro Tiba
26	DF	BRA	Djavan
41	DF	POR	Rúben Ferreira
46	FW	POR	Stephen Eustáquio
73	FW	BRA	Matheus Pereira
91	FW	BRA	Davidson
92	DF	BRA	Victor Massaia
96	DF	BRA	Rafael Furlan
99	FW	BRA	Platiny

== Transfers ==
=== In ===
Pos.	Player	Signed from	Details	Date	Source
FW	(Colombia) Wilmar Jordán	(Bulgaria) CSKA Sofia	Free Transfer	May 16, 2017	
GK	(Portugal) Ricardo	(Portugal) Porto	Free Transfer	May 18, 2017	
DF	(Cape Verde) Félix Mathaus	(Portugal) Freamunde	Loan Return	June 1, 2017	
FW	(Brazil) Gustavo Souza	(Portugal) Juventude de Pedras Salgadas	Loan Return	June 1, 2017	
FW	(Portugal) José Xavier	(Portugal) Juventude de Pedras Salgadas	Loan Return	June 1, 2017	
MF	(Senegal) Latyr Fall	(Portugal) Vilaverdense	Loan Return	June 1, 2016	
MF	(Angola) Paná	(Portugal) Académico de Viseu	Loan Return	June 1, 2017	
DF	(Guinea-Bissau) Lamine Bá	(Portugal) Oliveirense	Loan Return	June 1, 2017	
FW	(Libya) Hamdou Elhouni	(Portugal) Benfica	Loan	June 1, 2017	
DF	(Brazil) Rafael Furlan	(Brazil) Grêmio Anápolis	Undisclosed	June 6, 2017	
MF	(Brazil) Foguinho	(Brazil) Grêmio Anápolis	Undisclosed	June 6, 2017	
FW	(Brazil) Platiny	(Portugal) Feirense	Free Transfer	June 20, 2017	
DF	(Brazil) Anderson Conceição	(Brazil) São Bernardo	Undisclosed	June 23, 2017	
FW	(Brazil) Tiago Galvão	(Serbia) Borac Čačak	Undisclosed	June 30, 2017	
DF	(Portugal) Paulinho	(Portugal) Braga	Undisclosed	June 30, 2017	
DF	(Portugal) Rúben Ferreira	(Portugal) Vitória de Guimarães	Undisclosed	July 3, 2017	
GK	(Brazil) João Paulo Kuspios	(Portugal) ARS Martinho	Undisclosed	July 4, 2017	
MF	(Brazil) Jefferson	(Croatia) Hajduk Split	€350K	July 5, 2017	
MF	(Portugal) Filipe Melo	(England) Sheffield Wednesday	Free Transfer	July 10, 2017	
DF	(Portugal) Domingos Duarte	(Portugal) Sporting CP	Loan	July 15, 2017	
FW	(Brazil) Matheus Pereira	(Portugal) Sporting CP	Loan	July 26, 2017	
FW	(Guinea-Bissau) Jorginho	(France) Saint-Étienne	Loan	July 31, 2017	
DF	(Brazil) Djavan	(Portugal) Braga	Free Transfer	August 31, 2017	
FW	(Serbia) Nikola Maraš	(Serbia) Rad	€400,000	August 31, 2017	
GK	(Brazil) João Paulo Kuspiosz	(Portugal) Cova da Piedade	Loan Return	January 26, 2018	
MF	(Portugal) Stephen Eustáquio	(Portugal) Leixões	€500,000	January 31, 2018	
DF	(Portugal) Hugo Basto	(Portugal) Arouca	Undisclosed	February 1, 2018	

|}

=== Out ===
Pos.	Player	Signed by	Details	Date	Source
FW	(Portugal) Fábio Martins	(Portugal) Braga	End of Loan	June 1, 2017	
DF	(Cape Verde) Carlos Ponck	(Portugal) Benfica	End of Loan	June 1, 2017	
FW	(Libya) Hamdou Elhouni	(Portugal) Benfica	End of Loan	June 1, 2017	
DF	(Brazil) Rodrigo Soares	(Portugal) Porto	End of Loan	June 1, 2017	
MF	(Angola) Paná	(Portugal) Académico de Viseu	Free Transfer	June 1, 2017	
MF	(Senegal) Latyr Fall	(Portugal) Vilaverdense	Free Transfer	June 1, 2017	
DF	(Guinea-Bissau) Lamine Bá	Free Agent	Rescind Contract	June 1, 2017	
MF	(Brazil) Gustavo Souza	Free Agent	Rescind Contract	June 1, 2017	
DF	(Brazil) Felipe Lopes	(Portugal) Nacional	Rescind Contract	June 1, 2017	
DF	(Serbia) Nemanja Petrović	(Serbia) Napredak Kruševac	Free Transfer	June 21, 2017	
FW	(Portugal) Rafael Lopes	(Portugal) Desportivo das Aves	Free Transfer	June 24, 2017	
DF	(Portugal) Fábio Santos	(Portugal) Académico de Viseu	Free Transfer	June 26, 2017	
MF	(Portugal) Bruno Braga	(Portugal) Desportivo das Aves	Free Transfer	June 29, 2017	
FW	(Senegal) Alioune Fall	(Portugal) Gil Vicente	Free Transfer	July 1, 2017	
DF	(Portugal) Nélson Lenho	(Portugal) Desportivo das Aves	Rescind Contract	July 3, 2017	
DF	(Cape Verde) Félix Mathaus	(Portugal) Oliveirense	Undisclosed	July 3, 2017	
FW	(Portugal) Rafael Lopes	(Cyprus) Omonia	Free Transfer	July 10, 2017	
FW	(Guinea-Bissau) João Mário	(Portugal) Académico de Viseu	Free Transfer	July 12, 2017	
GK	(Brazil) João Paulo Kuspiosz	(Portugal) Cova da Piedade	Loan	July 14, 2017	
FW	(Brazil) Rafael Batatinha	(Portugal) Gil Vicente	Loan	August 6, 2017	
FW	(Portugal) José Xavier	(England) Wolverhampton Wanderers	Rescind Contract	August 31, 2017	
MF	(Brazil) Foguinho	(Brazil) Cruzeiro-RS	Rescind Contract	August 31, 2017	
DF	(Portugal) Rúben Ferreira	(Portugal) Marítimo	Rescind Contract	December 15, 2017	
DF	(Brazil) Anderson Conceição	(Brazil) Clube de Regatas Brasil	Rescind Contract	December 31, 2017	
FW	(Brazil) Rafael Batatinha	(Portugal) Santa Clara	Rescind Contract	January 9, 2018	
FW	(Colombia) Wilmar Jordán	(Portugal) Famalicão	Loan	January 31, 2018	
FW	(Libya) Hamdou Elhouni	(Portugal) Benfica	Rescind Contract	January 31, 2018	
DF	(Brazil) Victor Massaia	(Portugal) Arouca	Rescind Contract	January 31, 2018	

== Pre-season and friendlies ==
Win Draw Loss

8 July 2017 Friendly	Chaves (Portugal)	3–0	(Portugal) SC Braga B	Chaves, Portugal
10:30 WEST (UTC+01:00)	Jefferson 6'; Tiba 27'; Ferreira 48'	Report		Stadium: Estádio Municipal Eng. Manuel Branco Teixeira

12 July 2017 Friendly	Chaves (Portugal)	1–1	(Portugal) Moreirense	Vila Pouca de Aguiar, Portugal
18:00 WEST (UTC+01:00)	Platiny 24'	Report	Costa 15'	Stadium: Complexo Desportivo de Vila Pouca de Aguiar

15 July 2016 Friendly	Tondela (Portugal)	2–2	(Portugal) Chaves	Tondela, Portugal
WEST (UTC+01:00)	Boyd 22'; Osorio 45'	Report	Davidson 48'; Jordán 90'	Stadium: Estádio João Cardoso

19 July 2017 Friendly	Chaves (Portugal)	1–0	(Portugal) Marítimo	Chaves, Portugal
18:00 WEST (UTC+01:00)	William 13'	Report		Stadium: Estádio Municipal Eng. Manuel Branco Teixeira

22 July 2017 Friendly	Chaves (Portugal)	2–0	(Portugal) Aves	Chaves, Portugal
18:00 WEST (UTC+01:00)	Melo 49'; Jordán 88'	Report		Stadium: Estádio Municipal Eng. Manuel Branco Teixeira

28 July 2017 Friendly	Chaves (Portugal)	1–0	(Portugal) Boavista	Melgaço, Portugal
19:00 WEST (UTC+01:00)	Jefferson 64'	Report		Stadium: Centro de estágios de Melgaço Melgaço, Portugal

2 August 2017 Friendly	Chaves (Portugal)	3–0	(Portugal) Porto B	Chaves, Portugal
WEST (UTC+01:00)	William 32'; Jorginho 67'; Elhouni 80'	Report		Stadium: Estádio Municipal Eng. Manuel Branco Teixeira

== Competitions ==
=== Overall record ===
As of match played on 11 May 2018

Performance by competition
Competition	Starting round	Final position/round	First match	Last match
Primeira Liga	—N/a	6th	10 August 2017	11 May 2018
Taça de Portugal	Third round	Fourth round	15 October 2017	19 November 2017
Taça da Liga	Second round	Second round	3 September 2017	3 September 2017

Statistics by competition
Competition	Pld	W	D	L	GF	GA	GD	Win%
Primeira Liga	34	13	8	13	47	58	−11	38.24
Taça de Portugal	2	1	0	1	3	2	+1	50.00
Taça da Liga	1	0	0	1	1	3	−2	0.00
Total	37	14	8	15	51	63	−12	37.84

=== Primeira Liga ===
==== League table ====
Pos	Team	Pld	W	D	L	GF	GA	GD	Pts	Qualification or relegation
4	Braga	34	24	3	7	74	29	+45	75	Qualification for the Europa League third qualifying round (Note: Desportivo das Aves qualified for the Europa league group stage by winning the 2017–18 Taça de Portugal. However, since they failed to obtain a license for European competitions, the spot awarded to the cup winners (Europa League group stage) was passed to the third-placed team, the spot awarded to the third-placed team (Europa League third qualifying round) was passed to the fourth-placed team, and the spot awarded to the fourth-placed team was passed to the fifth-placed team (Europa league second qualifying round).)
5	Rio Ave	34	15	6	13	40	42	−2	51	Qualification for the Europa League second qualifying round
6	Chaves	34	13	8	13	47	55	−8	47 (Note: Chaves finished ahead of Marítimo on head-to-head points: Chaves 4–1 Marítimo, Marítimo 1–2 Chaves.)	
7	Marítimo	34	13	8	13	36	49	−13	47	
8	Boavista	34	13	6	15	35	44	−9	45	

Source: Liga Portugal
Rules for classification: 1) Points; 2) Head-to-head points; 3) Head-to-head goal difference; 4) Head-to-head away goals scored; 5) Goal difference; 6) Matches won; 7) Goals scored; 8) Play-off. (Note: only criteria 1, 5, 6 and 7 are applied to establish the classification during the competition.)

==== Results by round ====
Round	1	2	3	4	5	6	7	8	9	10	11	12	13	14	15	16	17	18	19	20	21	22	23	24	25	26	27	28	29	30	31	32	33	34
Ground	A	H	A	H	A	H	A	H	A	A	H	A	H	A	H	A	H	H	A	H	A	H	A	H	A	H	H	A	H	A	H	A	H	A
Result	L	L	D	L	L	W	W	D	L	L	W	W	D	W	D	W	D	W	L	D	W	L	W	W	L	L	L	L	D	D	W	L	W	W
Position	12	18	17	17	18	17	11	11	15	15	14	11	11	8	9	8	8	7	8	8	6	7	6	6	6	7	8	8	8	8	7	8	6	6

Updated to match(es) played on 11 May 2018. Source:
A = Away; H = Home; W = Win; D = Draw; L = Loss

==== Matches ====
10 August 2017 1	Vitória de Guimarães	3–2	Chaves	Guimarães
21:00 WEST (UTC+01:00)	Zungu 23'; Hurtado 32'; Raphinha 57'	Report	William 80', 88'	Stadium: Estádio D. Afonso Henriques; Attendance: 19,753; Referee: Luís Godinho

14 August 2017 2	Chaves	0–1	Benfica	Chaves
21:00 WEST (UTC+01:00)		Report	Seferovic 90+3'	Stadium: Estádio Municipal Eng. Manuel Branco Teixeira; Attendance: 8,480; Referee: Jorge Sousa

20 August 2017 3	Vitória de Setúbal	1–1	Chaves	Setúbal
16:00 WEST (UTC+01:00)	Amaral 57'	Report	Tiba 78'	Stadium: Estádio do Bonfim; Attendance: 1,708; Referee: Manuel Mota

26 August 2017 4	Chaves	0–2	Feirense	Chaves
18:15 WEST (UTC+01:00)		Report	Ramos 26'; Silva 86'	Stadium: Estádio Municipal Eng. Manuel Branco Teixeira; Attendance: 4,513; Referee: Luís Ferreira

9 September 2017 5	Porto	3–0	Chaves	Porto
20:30 WEST (UTC+01:00)	Aboubakar 49'; Soares 86'; Marega 89'	Report		Stadium: Estádio do Dragão; Attendance: 43,109; Referee: Rui Oliveira

18 September 2017 6	Chaves	3–0	Moreirense	Chaves
21:00 WEST (UTC+01:00)	Tiba 49'; Bressan 61'; William 65'	Report		Stadium: Estádio Municipal Eng. Manuel Branco Teixeira; Attendance: 2,818; Referee: João Pinheiro

23 September 2017 7	Estoril	0–2	Chaves	Estoril
16:00 WEST (UTC+01:00)		Report	Bressan 40'; Djavan 67'	Stadium: Estádio António Coimbra da Mota; Attendance: 1,563; Referee: Artur Soares Dias

29 September 2017 8	Chaves	1–1	Tondela	Chaves
20:30 WEST (UTC+01:00)	William 14'	Report	Tavares 31'	Stadium: Estádio Municipal Eng. Manuel Branco Teixeira; Attendance: 3,200; Referee: Bruno Paixão

22 October 2017 9	Sporting CP	5–1	Chaves	Lisbon
20:15 WEST (UTC+01:00)	Dost 6', 15', 75'; Acuna 39', 58'	Report	Davidson 90+2'	Stadium: Estádio José Alvalade; Attendance: 42,285; Referee: Rui Costa

29 October 2017 10	Braga	1–0	Chaves	Braga
16:00 WEST (UTC+01:00)	Bruno Viana 58'	Report		Stadium: Estádio Municipal de Braga; Attendance: 11,620; Referee: Bruno Paixão

5 November 2017 11	Chaves	4–2	Paços de Ferreira	Chaves
16:00 WEST (UTC+01:00)	Maraš 34'; Platiny 49', 67'; Jorginho 84'	Report	Welthon 7'; Góis 70'	Stadium: Estádio Municipal Eng. Manuel Branco Teixeira; Attendance: 2,555; Referee: Vasco Santos

24 November 2017 12	Belenenses	0–1	Chaves	Lisbon
20:30 WEST (UTC+01:00)		Report	Pereira 45'	Stadium: Estádio do Restelo; Attendance: 2,713; Referee: João Capela

2 December 2017 13	Chaves	0–0	Boavista	Chaves
20:30 WET (UTC±01:00)		Report		Stadium: Estádio Municipal Eng. Manuel Branco Teixeira; Attendance: 2,786; Referee: Manuel Mota

10 December 2017 14	Portimonense	0–1	Chaves	Portimão
16:00 WEST (UTC+01:00)		Report	Tiba 90+3' (pen.)	Stadium: Estádio Municipal de Portimão; Attendance: 2,511; Referee: Fábio Veríssimo

17 December 2017 15	Chaves	1–1	Rio Ave	Chaves
16:00 WEST (UTC+01:00)	Bressan 72'	Report	Novais 6'	Stadium: Estádio Municipal Eng. Manuel Branco Teixeira; Attendance: 2,590; Referee: Bruno Paixão

3 January 2018 16	Marítimo	1–2	Chaves	Funchal
18:15 WEST (UTC+01:00)	Oliveira 83'	Report	Platiny 24'; Davidson 50'	Stadium: Estádio do Marítimo; Attendance: 4,533; Referee: Manuel Oliveira

7 January 2018 17	Chaves	1–1	Desportivo das Aves	Chaves
11:45 WEST (UTC+01:00)	William 79'	Report	Derley 45'	Stadium: Estádio Municipal Eng. Manuel Branco Teixeira; Attendance: 2,508; Referee: João Capela

12 January 2018 18	Chaves	4–3	Vitória de Guimarães	Chaves
20:30 WEST (UTC+01:00)	Tiba 35', 90+6' (pen.); Davidson 37', 43'	Report	Hurtado 10'; Raphinha 16'; Tallo 39'	Stadium: Estádio Municipal Eng. Manuel Branco Teixeira; Attendance: 3,436; Referee: Tiago Martins

20 January 2018 19	Benfica	3–0	Chaves	Lisbon
18:15 WET (UTC+01:00)	Jonas 13', 19'; Pizzi 47'	Report		Stadium: Estádio da Luz; Attendance: 57,383; Referee: Bruno Esteves

31 January 2018 20	Chaves	2–2	Vitória de Setúbal	Chaves
19:00 WEST (UTC+01:00)	William 10', 51'	Report	Edinho 16' (pen.); Fernandes 90+5'	Stadium: Estádio Municipal Eng. Manuel Branco Teixeira; Attendance: 2,076; Referee: António Nobre

4 February 2018 21	Feirense	1–2	Chaves	Santa Maria da Feira
16:00 WET (UTC+01:00)	Luís Rocha 34'	Report	William 24'; Pereira 87'	Stadium: Estádio Marcolino de Castro; Attendance: 3,613; Referee: Rui Costa

11 February 2018 22	Chaves	0–4	Porto	Chaves
16:00 WEST (UTC+01:00)		Report	Soares 15', 28'; Marega 57'; Oliveira 90'	Stadium: Estádio Municipal Eng. Manuel Branco Teixeira; Attendance: 6,900; Referee: Artur Soares Dias

18 February 2018 23	Moreirense	0–1	Chaves	Moreira de Cónegos
16:00 WEST (UTC+01:00)		Report	Bressan 74' (pen.)	Stadium: Parque Joaquim de Almeida Freitas; Attendance: 2,134; Referee: Nuno Almeida

25 February 2018 24	Chaves	2–0	Estoril	Chaves
WEST (UTC+01:00)	William 17'; Pereira 83'	Report		Stadium: Estádio Municipal Eng. Manuel Branco Teixeira; Attendance: 3,177; Referee: Rui Oliveira

4 March 2018 25	Tondela	2–0	Chaves	Tondela
11:45 WEST (UTC+01:00)	Costa 42'; Tomané 90+5'	Report		Stadium: Estádio João Cardoso; Attendance: 1,603; Referee: Carlos Xistra

12 March 2018 26	Chaves	1–2	Sporting CP	Chaves
19:00 WEST (UTC+01:00)	Platiny 90+1' (pen.)	Report	Dost 62', 86'	Stadium: Estádio Municipal Eng. Manuel Branco Teixeira; Attendance: 3,208; Referee: Hugo Miguel

18 March 2018 27	Chaves	1–4	Braga	Chaves
18:00 WEST (UTC+01:00)	Platiny 76'	Report	Bruno Viana 27'; Horta 38', 90+1'; Paulinho 73'	Stadium: Estádio Municipal Eng. Manuel Branco Teixeira; Attendance: 4,219; Referee: Bruno Paixão

31 March 2018 28	Paços de Ferreira	2–0	Chaves	Paços de Ferreira
16:00 WEST (UTC+01:00)	Luiz Phellype 28'; Mabil 74'	Report		Stadium: Estádio Capital do Móvel; Attendance: 2,688; Referee: Hélder Malheiro

8 April 2018 29	Chaves	1–1	Belenenses	Chaves
16:00 WEST (UTC+01:00)	William 66'	Report	Fredy 62'	Stadium: Estádio Municipal Eng. Manuel Branco Teixeira; Attendance: 2,198; Referee: António Nobre

14 April 2018 30	Boavista	3–3	Chaves	Porto
18:15 WEST (UTC+01:00)	Carraça 25'; Santos 42', 77'	Report	Davidson 11'; Eustáquio 80'; Platiny 88'	Stadium: Estádio do Bessa; Attendance: 4,215; Referee: Manuel Mota

22 April 2018 31	Chaves	2–1	Portimonense	Chaves
16:00 WEST (UTC+01:00)	Tiba 61', 67'	Report	Fabrício 77'	Stadium: Estádio Municipal Eng. Manuel Branco Teixeira; Attendance: 2,491; Referee: Bruno Esteves

29 April 2018 32	Rio Ave	2–1	Chaves	Vila do Conde
16:00 WET (UTC±01:00)	Pelé 66' (pen.), 80' (pen.)	Report	Pereira 90+4'	Stadium: Estádio dos Arcos; Attendance: 4,325; Referee: Hugo Miguel

6 May 2018 33	Chaves	4–1	Marítimo	Chaves
18:00 WET (UTC±00:00)	Tiba 37'; Bressan 45+8' (pen.); Pereira 52', 77' (pen.)	Report	Bebeto 26'	Stadium: Estádio Municipal Eng. Manuel Branco Teixeira; Attendance: 4,503; Referee: Artur Soares Dias

11 May 2018 34	Desportivo das Aves	2–3	Chaves	Vila das Aves
20:30 WEST (UTC+01:00)	Jorge Fellipe 5'; Baldé 22'	Report	Tiba 20' (pen.); William 89'; Pereira 90+3'	Stadium: Estádio do CD Aves; Attendance: 1,519; Referee: Luís Ferreira

=== Taça de Portugal ===
==== Third round ====
15 October 2017	Fátima	0–3	Chaves	Fátima
15:00 WEST (UTC+01:00)		Report	Pereira 9'; Tiba 43' (pen.); Platiny 53'	Stadium: Estádio Papa Francisco; Attendance: 680; Referee: Tiago Martins

==== Fourth round ====
19 November 2017	Santa Clara	2–0	Chaves	Ponta Delgada
16:00 WEST (UTC+01:00)	Fernando 19'; Alves 23'	Report		Stadium: Estádio de São Miguel; Attendance: 3,487; Referee: Hugo Miguel

=== Taça da Liga ===
==== Second round ====
3 September 2017	Portimonense	3–1	Chaves	Portimão
15:00 WEST (UTC+01:00)	Pessoa 4'; Paulinho 51'; Fabrício 73'	Report	Tiba 4' (pen.)	Stadium: Estádio Municipal de Portimão; Attendance: 1,257; Referee: Bruno Esteves

== Player statistics ==
No.	Pos	Nat	Player	Total		Primeira Liga		Taça de Portugal		Taça da Liga	
No.	Pos	Nat	Player	Apps	Goals	Apps	Goals	Apps	Goals	Apps	Goals
Goalkeepers
1	GK	(Portugal) POR	António Filipe	19	0	16	0	2	0	1	0
13	GK	(Portugal) POR	Ricardo	18	0	18	0	0	0	0	0
23	GK	(Portugal) POR	Emanuel Novo	1	0	1	0	0	0	0	0
Defenders
2	DF	(Portugal) POR	Paulinho	36	0	33	0	2	0	1	0
14	DF	(Portugal) POR	Nuno André Coelho	11	0	10	0	0	0	1	0
15	DF	(Portugal) POR	Domingos Duarte	32	0	30	0	1	0	1	0
19	DF	(Serbia) SRB	Nikola Maraš	31	1	29	1	2	0	0	0
24	DF	(Portugal) POR	Pedro Queirós	3	0	3	0	0	0	0	0
26	DF	(Brazil) BRA	Djavan	24	1	23	1	1	0	0	0
96	DF	(Brazil) BRA	Rafael Furlan	11	0	10	0	1	0	0	0
Midfielders
5	MF	(Portugal) POR	Filipe Melo	12	0	10	0	1	0	1	0
6	MF	(Brazil) BRA	Jefferson	27	0	26	0	1	0	0	0
8	MF	(Portugal) POR	João Patrão	15	0	12	0	2	0	1	0
12	MF	(Belarus) BLR	Renan Bressan	35	5	32	5	2	0	1	0
20	MF	(Brazil) BRA	Tiago Galvão	8	0	8	0	0	0	0	0
25	MF	(Portugal) POR	Pedro Tiba	34	11	31	9	2	1	1	1
46	MF	(Portugal) POR	Stephen Eustáquio	13	1	13	1	0	0	0	0
Forwards
10	FW	(Brazil) BRA	Perdigão	22	0	20	0	1	0	1	0
11	FW	(Brazil) BRA	William	29	11	28	11	0	0	1	0
21	FW	(Guinea-Bissau) GNB	Jorginho	22	1	20	1	2	0	0	0
73	FW	(Brazil) BRA	Matheus Pereira	30	8	27	7	2	1	1	0
91	FW	(Brazil) BRA	Davidson	34	6	33	6	0	0	1	0
99	FW	(Brazil) BRA	Platiny	23	7	21	6	2	1	0	0
Players transferred out during the season
4	DF	(Brazil) BRA	Anderson Conceição	3	0	2	0	1	0	0	0
7	FW	(Libya) LBY	Hamdou Elhouni	13	0	12	0	1	0	0	0
9	FW	(Colombia) COL	Wilmar Jordán	3	0	2	0	0	0	1	0
41	DF	(Portugal) POR	Rúben Ferreira	6	0	4	0	1	0	1	0
92	DF	(Brazil) BRA	Victor Massaia	1	0	1	0	0	0	0	0

Last updated: 11 May 2018
