= List of Portuguese football transfers summer 2017 =

This is a list of Portuguese football transfers for the summer of 2017. The summer transfer window will open 1 July and close at midnight on 22 September. Players may be bought before the transfer windows opens, but may only join their new club on 1 July. Only moves involving Primeira Liga clubs are listed. Additionally, players without a club may join a club at any time.

== Transfers ==
Date	Name	Moving from	Moving to	Fee
17 April 2017	(Germany) Hany Mukhtar	(Portugal) Benfica	(Denmark) Brøndby	Undisclosed fee
24 April 2017	(Brazil) Bruno Nascimento	(Cyprus) Omonia	(Portugal) Feirense	Free
28 April 2017	(Portugal) André Pinto	(Portugal) Braga	(Portugal) Sporting CP	Undisclosed fee
15 May 2017	(Brazil) Mattheus Oliveira	(Portugal) Estoril Praia	(Portugal) Sporting CP	€2m
15 May 2017	(Italy) Cristiano Piccini	(Spain) Real Betis	(Portugal) Sporting CP	€3m
16 May 2017	(Colombia) Wilmar Jordán	(Bulgaria) CSKA Sofia	(Portugal) Chaves	Free
16 May 2017	(Australia) Dylan McGowan	(Australia) Adelaide United	(Portugal) Paços de Ferreira	Undisclosed fee
18 May 2017	(Portugal) Ricardo	(Portugal) Porto	(Portugal) Chaves	Free
19 May 2017	(Brazil) Mattheus	(Portugal) Estoril Praia	(Portugal) Sporting CP	Undisclosed fee
31 May 2017	(Portugal) Pedro Nuno	(Portugal) Benfica	(Portugal) Tondela	Loan
2 June 2017	(France) Hadi Sacko	(Portugal) Sporting CP	(England) Leeds United	Undisclosed fee
2 June 2017	(Switzerland) Haris Seferovic	(Germany) Eintracht Frankfurt	(Portugal) Benfica	Free
4 June 2017	(Brazil) Patrick Vieira	(Portugal) Marítimo	(Portugal) Benfica	Free
6 June 2017	(Brazil) Foguinho	(Brazil) Grêmio Esportivo	(Portugal) Chaves	Undisclosed fee
6 June 2017	(Brazil) Rafael Furlan	(Brazil) Grêmio Esportivo	(Portugal) Chaves	Undisclosed fee
6 June 2017	(Portugal) Joãozinho	(Belgium) Kortrijk	(Portugal) Tondela	Undisclosed fee
6 June 2017	(Spain) Alex Rodriguez	(Australia) Wellington Phoenix	(Portugal) Boavista	Undisclosed fee
7 June 2017	(Portugal) Fábio Cardoso	(Portugal) Vitória de Setúbal	(Scotland) Rangers	Undisclosed fee
7 June 2017	(Portugal) Pité	(Portugal) Porto	(Portugal) Tondela	Free
7 June 2017	(Portugal) Rúben Semedo	(Portugal) Sporting CP	(Spain) Villarreal	€14m
8 June 2017	(Portugal) David Bruno	(Portugal) Porto	(Portugal) Tondela	Free
8 June 2017	(Brazil) Ederson	(Portugal) Benfica	(England) Manchester City	€40m
9 June 2017	(Portugal) Filipe Chaby	(Portugal) Sporting CP	(Portugal) Belenenses	Undisclosed fee
9 June 2017	(Portugal) Xeka	(Portugal) Braga	(France) Lille	€5m
10 June 2017	(Portugal) Fábio Pacheco	(Portugal) Vitória de Setúbal	(Portugal) Marítimo	Undisclosed fee
11 June 2017	(Portugal) Daniel Candeias	(Portugal) Benfica	(Scotland) Rangers	Undisclosed fee
12 June 2017	(Portugal) Tomás Podstawski	(Portugal) Porto	(Portugal) Vitória de Setúbal	Free
12 June 2017	(Portugal) Andre Silva	(Portugal) Porto	(Italy) Milan	€35m
13 June 2017	(Portugal) Ricardo Costa	(Switzerland) Luzern	(Portugal) Tondela	Undisclosed fee
13 June 2017	(Croatia) Filip Krovinović	(Portugal) Rio Ave	(Portugal) Benfica	€3m
13 June 2017	(Portugal) Roderick Miranda	(Portugal) Rio Ave	(England) Wolverhampton Wanderers	Undisclosed fee
13 June 2017	(Malta) André Schembri	(Portugal) Boavista	(Cyprus) Apollon Limassol	Free
14 June 2017	(Belgium) Joris Kayembe	(Portugal) Porto	(France) Nantes	Undisclosed fee
14 June 2017	(Sweden) Victor Lindelöf	(Portugal) Benfica	(England) Manchester United	€35m
14 June 2017	(Cameroon) Azongha Tembeng	(Algeria) El Eulma	(Portugal) Tondela	Undisclosed fee
15 June 2017	(Brazil) Anderson Correira	(Portugal) Boavista	(Cyprus) Nea Salamis	Undisclosed fee
15 June 2017	(Brazil) Marçal	(Portugal) Benfica	(France) Lyon	€4.5m
16 June 2017	(Portugal) Nuno Santos	(Portugal) Benfica	(Portugal) Rio Ave	Undisclosed fee
17 June 2017	(Argentina) Rodrigo Battaglia	(Portugal) Braga	(Portugal) Sporting CP	Undisclosed fee
17 June 2017	(Portugal) Ricardo Esgaio	(Portugal) Sporting CP	(Portugal) Braga	Undisclosed fee
17 June 2017	(Brazil) Jefferson	(Portugal) Sporting CP	(Portugal) Braga	Loan
19 June 2017	(Portugal) Bruno Gaspar	(Portugal) Vitória Guimarães	(Italy) Fiorentina	Undisclosed fee
19 June 2017	(France) Stéphane Sparagna	(France) Marseille	(Portugal) Boavista	Undisclosed fee
20 June 2017	(Australia) Nick Ansell	(Australia) Melbourne Victory	(Portugal) Tondela	Free
20 June 2017	(Brazil) Jander	(Portugal) Moreirense	(Cyprus) Apollon Limassol	Undisclosed fee
20 June 2017	(Portugal) Rúben Pinto	(Portugal) Belenenses	(Bulgaria) CSKA Sofia	Undisclosed fee
20 June 2017	(Brazil) Platiny	(Portugal) Feirense	(Portugal) Chaves	Free
20 June 2017	(Portugal) Pedro Rebocho	(Portugal) Moreirense	(France) EA Guingamp	Undisclosed fee
20 June 2017	(Brazil) Dyego Sousa	(Portugal) Marítimo	(Portugal) Braga	Undisclosed fee
20 June 2017	(Poland) Mateusz Zachara	(Poland) Wisła Kraków	(Portugal) Tondela	Undisclosed fee
21 June 2017	(Spain) Andrés Fernández	(Portugal) Porto	(Spain) Villarreal	€2m
21 June 2017	(Serbia) Nemanja Petrović	(Portugal) Chaves	(Serbia) Napredak Kruševac	Undisclosed fee
22 June 2017	(Chile) Igor Lichnovsky	(Portugal) Porto	(Mexico) Necaxa	€1.8m
23 June 2017	(Brazil) Anderson Conceição	(Brazil) Tombense	(Portugal) Chaves	Undisclosed fee
23 June 2017	(Belgium) Laurent Depoitre	(Portugal) Porto	(England) Huddersfield Town	Undisclosed fee
23 June 2017	(Angola) Núrio Fortuna	(Portugal) Braga	(Belgium) Charleroi	Undisclosed fee
26 June 2017	(Portugal) Fábio Santos	(Portugal) Chaves	(Portugal) Académico de Viseu	Free
27 June 2017	(Portugal) Bruno Fernandes	(Italy) Sampdoria	(Portugal) Sporting CP	€8.5m
27 June 2017	(Portugal) Fernando Ferreira	(Portugal) Tondela	(Portugal) Académico de Viseu	Undisclosed fee
27 June 2017	(Serbia) Luka Jović	(Portugal) Benfica	(Germany) Eintracht Frankfurt	Loan
27 June 2017	(Brazil) Iago Santos	(United Arab Emirates) Dibba Al-Hisn	(Portugal) Moreirense	Undisclosed fee
28 June 2017	(Brazil) Lucas Evangelista	(Italy) Udinese	(Portugal) Estoril Praia	Loan
28 June 2017	(Brazil) Ibson	(Cyprus) Ermis Aradippou	(Portugal) Marítimo	Undisclosed fee
29 June 2017	(Portugal) Bruno Braga	(Portugal) Chaves	(Portugal) Aves	Free
29 June 2017	(Brazil) Adriano Facchini	(Portugal) Nacional	(Portugal) Aves	Undisclosed fee
29 June 2017	(Brazil) Diego Galo	(Portugal) Moreirense	(Portugal) Aves	Undisclosed fee
29 June 2017	(Sweden) Viktor Lundberg	(Denmark) Randers	(Portugal) Marítimo	Undisclosed fee
29 June 2017	(Guinea-Bissau) Pelé	(Portugal) Benfica	(Portugal) Rio Ave	Undisclosed fee
29 June 2017	(Brazil) Nildo Petrolina	(Portugal) Moreirense	(Portugal) Aves	Undisclosed fee
29 June 2017	(Portugal) Francisco Ramos	(Portugal) Porto	(Portugal) Vitória Guimarães	Free
30 June 2017	(Czech Republic) Martin Chrien	(Czech Republic) Viktoria Plzeň	(Portugal) Benfica	Undisclosed fee
30 June 2017	(Ivory Coast) Seydou Doumbia	(Italy) Roma	(Portugal) Sporting CP	Loan
30 June 2017	(Brazil) Tiago Galvâo	(Serbia) Borac Čačak	(Portugal) Chaves	Undisclosed fee
30 June 2017	(Portugal) Paulinho	(Portugal) Braga	(Portugal) Chaves	Undisclosed fee
30 June 2017	(Brazil) Caio Rangel	(Italy) Cagliari	(Portugal) Estoril Praia	Undisclosed fee
30 June 2017	(Portugal) Yuri Ribeiro	(Portugal) Benfica	(Portugal) Rio Ave	Loan
1 July 2017	(Portugal) Salvador Agra	(Portugal) Nacional	(Portugal) Benfica	Undisclosed fee
1 July 2017	(Colombia) Cristian Arango	(Colombia) Envigado	(Portugal) Benfica	Undisclosed fee
1 July 2017	(Portugal) Arsénio	(Bulgaria) CSKA Sofia	(Portugal) Moreirense	Undisclosed fee
1 July 2017	(Brazil) Anderson Carvalho	(Portugal) Boavista	(Russia) Tosno	Undisclosed fee
1 July 2017	(Senegal) Alioune Fall	(Portugal) Chaves	(Portugal) Gil Vicente	Free
1 July 2017	(Austria) Kevin Friesenbichler	(Portugal) Benfica	Austria Wien	Undisclosed fee
1 July 2017	(Portugal) Tiago Rodrigues	(Portugal) Porto	(Bulgaria) CSKA Sofia	Free
1 July 2017	(England) Chris Willock	(England) Arsenal	(Portugal) Benfica	Undisclosed fee
2 July 2017	(Brazil) Philipe Sampaio	(Portugal) Boavista	(Russia) Akhmat Grozny	Undisclosed fee
2 July 2017	(Portugal) Bruno Varela	(Portugal) Vitória de Setúbal	(Portugal) Benfica	Undisclosed fee
3 July 2017	(Mexico) Antonio Briseño	(Mexico) UANL	(Portugal) Feirense	Undisclosed fee
3 July 2017	(Portugal) Rúben Ferreira	(Portugal) Vitória Guimarães	(Portugal) Chaves	Undisclosed fee
3 July 2017	(Portugal) Nélson Lenho	(Portugal) Chaves	(Portugal) Aves	Undisclosed fee
3 July 2017	(Mexico) Joao Maleck	(Mexico) Santos Laguna	(Portugal) Porto	Loan
3 July 2017	(Cape Verde) Félix Mathaus	(Portugal) Chaves	(Portugal) Oliveirense	Undisclosed fee
3 July 2017	(Guinea-Bissau) Leocísio Sami	(Portugal) Porto	(Portugal) Aves	Free
3 July 2017	(Portugal) Alex Soares	(Portugal) Marítimo	(Cyprus) Omonia	Undisclosed fee
4 July 2017	(Brazil) João Paulo Kuspiosz	(Portugal) Martinho	(Portugal) Chaves	Undisclosed fee
5 July 2017	(Nigeria) Chidozie Awaziem	(Portugal) Porto	(France) Nantes	Loan
5 July 2017	(Portugal) Fábio Coentrão	(Spain) Real Madrid	(Portugal) Sporting CP	Loan
5 July 2017	(Portugal) Edgar Ié	(Portugal) Belenenses	(France) Lille	Undisclosed fee
5 July 2017	(Brazil) Jefferson	(Croatia) Hajduk Split	(Portugal) Chaves	Undisclosed fee
5 July 2017	(Lithuania) Lukas Spalvis	(Portugal) Sporting CP	(Germany) 1. FC Kaiserslautern	Loan
6 July 2017	(Mexico) Omar Govea	(Portugal) Porto	(Belgium) Excel Mouscron	Loan
7 July 2017	(Australia) Awer Mabil	(Denmark) Midtjylland	(Portugal) Paços de Ferreira	Loan
7 July 2017	(France) Jérémy Mathieu	(Spain) Barcelona	(Portugal) Sporting CP	Free
7 July 2017	(Brazil) Bruno Viana	(Greece) Olympiacos	(Portugal) Braga	Loan
8 July 2017	(France) Willy Boly	(Portugal) Porto	(England) Wolverhampton Wanderers	Loan
8 July 2017	(Portugal) Rúben Neves	(Portugal) Porto	(England) Wolverhampton Wanderers	€18m
9 July 2017	(Portugal) João Afonso	(Portugal) Vitória de Guimarães	(Spain) Córdoba	Loan
10 July 2017	(Portugal) Rafael Lopes	(Portugal) Chaves	(Cyprus) Omonia	Undisclosed fee
10 July 2017	(Portugal) Filipe Melo	(England) Sheffield Wednesday	(Portugal) Chaves	Free
10 July 2017	(Brazil) Patrick Vieira	(Portugal) Benfica	(Portugal) Vitória de Setúbal	Loan
11 July 2017	(Portugal) Salvador Agra	(Portugal) Benfica	(Portugal) Aves	Loan
12 July 2017	(Guinea-Bissau) João Mário	(Portugal) Chaves	(Portugal) Académico de Viseu	Free
13 July 2017	(Portugal) André Moreira	(Spain) Atlético Madrid	(Portugal) Braga	Loan
13 July 2017	(Portugal) Nélson Semedo	(Portugal) Benfica	(Spain) Barcelona	€30m
14 July 2017	(Portugal) Alex	(Portugal) Vitória de Guimarães	(Italy) Salernitana	Undisclosed fee
14 July 2017	(Spain) José Ángel	(Portugal) Porto	(Spain) Eibar	Free
14 July 2017	(Brazil) João Paulo Kuspiosz	(Portugal) Chaves	(Portugal) Cova da Piedade	Loan
15 July 2017	(Brazil) Vaná	(Portugal) Feirense	(Portugal) Porto	Undisclosed fee
17 July 2017	(Turkey) Sinan Bolat	(Portugal) Porto	(Belgium) Royal Antwerp	Undisclosed fee
17 July 2017	(Portugal) Paulo Oliveira	(Portugal) Sporting CP	(Spain) Eibar	€3.5m
18 July 2017	(Portugal) Aníbal Capela	(Portugal) Rio Ave	(Italy) Carpi	Free
18 July 2017	(Portugal) Ricardo Horta	(Spain) Málaga	(Portugal) Braga	Free
18 July 2017	(Portugal) Ivo Rodrigues	(Portugal) Porto	(Belgium) Royal Antwerp	Loan
19 July 2017	(Spain) Juankar	(Portugal) Braga	(Spain) Málaga	Free
20 July 2017	(Brazil) César	(Portugal) Benfica	(Portugal) Vitória de Setúbal	Loan
20 July 2017	(Peru) Paolo Hurtado	(England) Reading	(Portugal) Vitória de Guimarães	Undisclosed fee
20 July 2017	(Portugal) Gonçalo Paciência	(Portugal) Porto	(Portugal) Vitória de Setúbal	Loan
21 July 2017	(Argentina) Marcos Acuña	(Argentina) Racing Club	(Portugal) Sporting CP	€9.6m
21 July 2017	(Colombia) Guillermo Celis	(Portugal) Benfica	(Portugal) Vitória de Guimarães	€1m
21 July 2017	(Brazil) Ewerton	(Portugal) Sporting CP	(Germany) 1. FC Nürnberg	Undisclosed fee
24 July 2017	(Portugal) Artur Jorge	(Portugal) Braga	(Belgium) Excel Mouscron	Loan
26 July 2017	(Serbia) Igor Stefanović	(Portugal) Moreirense	(Spain) Córdoba	Free
29 July 2017	(Venezuela) Jhon Murillo	(Portugal) Benfica	(Turkey) Kasımpaşa	Loan
29 July 2017	(France) Romain Salin	(France) EA Guingamp	(Portugal) Sporting CP	Undisclosed fee
31 July 2017	(Portugal) Jorginho	(France) Saint-Étienne	(Portugal) Chaves	Loan
3 August 2017	(Colombia) Cristian Arango	(Portugal) Benfica	(Portugal) Aves	Loan
6 August 2017	(Brazil) Rafael Batatinha	(Portugal) Chaves	(Portugal) Gil Vicente	Loan
7 August 2017	(Netherlands) Luc Castaignos	(Portugal) Sporting CP	(Netherlands) Vitesse	Loan
7 August 2017	(North Macedonia) Stefan Ristovski	(Croatia) Rijeka	(Portugal) Sporting CP	Loan
9 August 2017	(Nigeria) Mikel Agu	(Portugal) Porto	(Turkey) Bursaspor	Loan
11 August 2017	(Spain) Adrián López	(Portugal) Porto	(Spain) Deportivo La Coruña	Loan
11 August 2017	(Netherlands) Bruno Martins Indi	(Portugal) Porto	(England) Stoke City	Undisclosed fee
15 August 2017	(Portugal) Artur Jorge	(Portugal) Braga	(Romania) Steaua București	Loan
15 August 2017	(Croatia) Mato Miloš	(Croatia) Istra 1961	(Portugal) Benfica	€400.000
16 August 2017	(Ghana) Emmanuel Boateng	(Portugal) Moreirense	(Spain) Levante	Free
16 August 2017	(Portugal) Frederico Venâncio	(Portugal) Vitória de Setúbal	(England) Sheffield Wednesday	Loan
17 August 2017	(Portugal) Rui Fonte	(Portugal) Braga	(England) Fulham	Undisclosed fee
22 August 2017	(Portugal) Rafa Soares	(Portugal) Porto	(England) Fulham	Loan
24 August 2017	(Peru) André Carrillo	(Portugal) Benfica	(England) Watford	Loan
28 August 2017	(Belgium) Mile Svilar	(Belgium) Anderlecht	(Portugal) Benfica	€2.5M
29 August 2017	(Brazil) Victor Andrade	(Portugal) Benfica	(Portugal) Estoril Praia	Undisclosed fee
30 August 2017	(Senegal) Abdoulaye Ba	(Portugal) Porto	(Spain) Rayo Vallecano	Undisclosed fee
30 August 2017	(Portugal) André Horta	(Portugal) Benfica	(Portugal) Braga	Loan
30 August 2017	(South Korea) Suk Hyun-jun	(Portugal) Porto	(France) Troyes	Loan
31 August 2017	(Brazil) Gabriel Barbosa	(Italy) Inter Milan	(Portugal) Benfica	Loan
31 August 2017	(Brazil) Djavan	(Portugal) Braga	(Portugal) Chaves	Undisclosed fee
31 August 2017	(Brazil) Douglas	(Spain) Barcelona	(Portugal) Benfica	Loan
31 August 2017	(Serbia) Nikola Maraš	(Serbia) Rad	(Portugal) Chaves	€400.000
31 August 2017	(Croatia) Mato Miloš	(Portugal) Benfica	(Poland) Lechia Gdańsk	Loan
31 August 2017	(Germany) Lukas Raeder	(Portugal) Vitória de Setúbal	(England) Bradford City	Free
31 August 2017	(Italy) Ezequiel Schelotto	(Portugal) Sporting CP	(England) Brighton & Hove Albion	Undisclosed fee
31 August 2017	(Portugal) João Carlos Teixeira	(Portugal) Porto	(Portugal) Braga	Loan
31 August 2017	(Netherlands) Marvin Zeegelaar	(Portugal) Sporting CP	(England) Watford	Undisclosed fee
1 September 2017	(Colombia) Leonardo Acevedo	(Portugal) Sporting CP	(Portugal) Boavista	Loan
1 September 2017	(Guinea) Mama Baldé	(Portugal) Sporting CP	(Portugal) Aves	Loan
1 September 2017	(Portugal) Domingos Duarte	(Portugal) Sporting CP	(Portugal) Chaves	Loan
1 September 2017	(Scotland) Ryan Gauld	(Portugal) Sporting CP	(Portugal) Aves	Loan
1 September 2017	(Portugal) André Geraldes	(Portugal) Sporting CP	(Portugal) Belenenses	Loan
1 September 2017	(Portugal) Francisco Geraldes	(Portugal) Sporting CP	(Portugal) Rio Ave	Loan
1 September 2017	(Greece) Kostas Mitroglou	(Portugal) Benfica	(France) Marseille	€15m
1 September 2017	(Brazil) Matheus Pereira	(Portugal) Sporting CP	(Portugal) Chaves	Loan
1 September 2017	(Cape Verde) Héldon Ramos	(Portugal) Sporting CP	(Portugal) Vitória de Guimarães	Loan
1 September 2017	(Spain) Oriol Rosell	(Portugal) Sporting CP	(Portugal) Portimonense	Loan
1 September 2017	(Bulgaria) Simeon Slavchev	(Portugal) Sporting CP	(Poland) Lechia Gdańsk	Loan
