= List of Portuguese football transfers winter 2016–17 =

This is a list of Portuguese football transfers for the winter of 2016–17. The summer transfer window will open 1 January and close at midnight on 1 February. Players may be bought before the transfer windows opens, but may only join their new club on 1 January. Only moves involving Primeira Liga clubs are listed. Additionally, players without a club may join a club at any time.

== Transfers ==
Date	Name	Moving from	Moving to	Fee
28 November 2016	(Portugal) Pedro Nuno	(Portugal) Académica de Coimbra	(Portugal) Benfica	Undisclosed fee
7 December 2016	(Portugal) Pedro Nuno	(Portugal) Benfica	(Portugal) Tondela	Loan
22 December 2016	(Norway) Stian Ringstad	(Portugal) Braga	(Norway) Strømsgodset	Undisclosed fee
27 December 2016	(Brazil) Rafael Batatinha	(Portugal) Santa Clara	(Portugal) Chaves	Free
3 January 2017	(Brazil) Vagner	(Belgium) Royal Excel Mouscron	(Portugal) Boavista	Loan
4 January 2017	(Guinea-Bissau) Gerso	(Portugal) Belenenses	(United States) Sporting Kansas City	Undisclosed fee
7 January 2017	(Brazil) Marcelo Hermes	(Brazil) Grêmio	(Portugal) Benfica	Free
9 January 2017	(Brazil) Diego Lopes	(Portugal) Benfica	(Greece) Panetolikos	Loan
10 January 2017	(Morocco) Adel Taarabt	(Portugal) Benfica	(Italy) Genoa	Loan
10 January 2017	(Ghana) Alhassan Wakaso	(Portugal) Rio Ave	(France) Lorient	Undisclosed fee
12 January 2017	(Belarus) Renan Bressan	(Cyprus) APOEL	(Portugal) Chaves	Free
13 January 2017	(Brazil) Evandro	(Portugal) Porto	(England) Hull City	Undisclosed fee
13 January 2017	(Netherlands) Ola John	(Portugal) Benfica	(Spain) Deportivo La Coruña	Loan
18 January 2017	(Portugal) Filipe Melo	(England) Sheffield Wednesday	(Portugal) Paços de Ferreira	Loan
20 January 2017	(Egypt) Ahmed Sayed	(Belgium) Lierse	(Portugal) Nacional	Loan
21 January 2017	(Portugal) Nuno André Coelho	(United States) Sporting Kansas City	(Portugal) Chaves	Free
21 January 2017	(South Africa) Luther Singh	(Sweden) GAIS	(Portugal) Braga	Free
21 January 2017	(Portugal) Silvestre Varela	(Portugal) Porto	(Turkey) Kayserispor	Undisclosed fee
23 January 2017	(Spain) Adrián López	(Portugal) Porto	(Spain) Villarreal	Loan
23 January 2017	(Brazil) Francisco Soares	(Portugal) Vitória Guimarães	(Portugal) Porto	Undisclosed fee
24 January 2017	(Portugal) Luís Martins	(Spain) Granada	(Portugal) Marítimo	Loan
25 January 2017	(Senegal) Abdoulaye Ba	(Portugal) Porto	(Germany) 1860 Munich	Loan
25 January 2017	(Brazil) Danilo Barbosa	(Portugal) Braga	(Belgium) Standard Liège	Loan
25 January 2017	(Portugal) Gonçalo Guedes	(Portugal) Benfica	(France) Paris Saint-Germain	€35,000,000
27 January 2017	(Italy) Bryan Cristante	(Portugal) Benfica	(Italy) Atalanta	Loan
27 January 2017	(Portugal) João Teixeira	(Portugal) Benfica	(England) Nottingham Forest	Loan
30 January 2017	(Portugal) Hélder Costa	(Portugal) Benfica	(England) Wolverhampton Wanderers	€15,000,000
30 January 2017	(Serbia) Filip Đuričić	(Portugal) Benfica	(Italy) Sampdoria	Undisclosed fee
30 January 2017	(Portugal) Pedro Pereira	(Italy) Sampdoria	(Portugal) Benfica	Undisclosed fee
31 January 2017	(Brazil) Filipe Augusto	(Portugal) Rio Ave	(Portugal) Benfica	Undisclosed fee
31 January 2017	(Montenegro) Marko Bakić	(Portugal) Braga	(Spain) Alcorcón	Loan
31 January 2017	(Spain) Alberto Bueno	(Portugal) Porto	(Spain) Leganés	Loan
31 January 2017	(Argentina) Federico Cartabia	(Spain) Deportivo La Coruña	(Portugal) Braga	Loan
31 January 2017	(Portugal) Sérgio Oliveira	(Portugal) Porto	(France) Nantes	Loan
31 January 2017	(Senegal) Modou Sougou	(England) Sheffield Wednesday	(Portugal) Moreirense	Loan
31 January 2017	(Mali) Adama Traoré	(France) Monaco	(Portugal) Rio Ave	Loan
31 January 2017	(Portugal) Xeka	(Portugal) Braga	(France) Lille	Loan
1 February 2017	(Colombia) Guillermo Celis	(Portugal) Benfica	(Portugal) Vitória de Guimarães	Loan
2 February 2017	(Argentina) Oscar Benítez	(Portugal) Benfica	(Argentina) Boca Juniors	Loan
2 February 2017	(Uruguay) Sebastián Coates	(England) Sunderland	(Portugal) Sporting CP	Undisclosed fee
2 February 2017	(Lithuania) Lukas Spalvis	(Portugal) Sporting CP	(Norway) Rosenborg	Loan
3 February 2017	(Brazil) Kelvin	(Portugal) Porto	(Brazil) Vasco da Gama	Loan
6 February 2017	(Portugal) Licá	(England) Nottingham Forest	(Portugal) Estoril Praia	Loan

- ^1 A player who signed with a club before the opening of the winter transfer window, will officially join his new club on 1 January. While a player who joined a club after 1 January will join his new club following his signature of the contract.
