= Emanuel Novo =

Portuguese footballer (born 1992)

Personal information
- Full name: Emanuel Rodrigues Novo
- Date of birth: 26 August 1992 (age 34)
- Place of birth: Vila do Conde, Portugal
- Height: 1.91 m (6 ft 3 in)
- Position: Goalkeeper

Team information
- Current team: Yongin
- Number: 1

Youth career
- 2002–2006: Varzim
- 2006–2011: Rio Ave

Senior career*
Years	Team	Apps	(Gls)
2011–2012	Oliveirense	5	(0)
2012–2013	Melgacense	1	(0)
2013–2014	Balasar		
2014–2016	Famalicão	18	(0)
2016–2018	Chaves	2	(0)
2018–2019	Varzim	26	(0)
2019–2020	Hermannstadt	6	(0)
2020–2021	Penafiel	12	(0)
2021	Felgueiras 1932	0	(0)
2021–2022	Jeddah	37	(0)
2022–2023	Al-Riyadh	33	(0)
2023–2024	Al-Taraji	25	(0)
2024–2025	Al-Jandal	11	(0)
2025–2026	São João Ver	10	(0)
2026–	Yongin	6	(0)
- * Club domestic league appearances and goals as of 6 August 2026

Emanuel Rodrigues Novo (born 26 August 1992) is a Portuguese professional footballer who plays as a goalkeeper for K League 2 club Yongin FC.

== Club career ==
Born in Vila do Conde, Novo played as a youth for local clubs Varzim S.C. and Rio Ave FC. His early senior career was however spent at a lower level – including A.D.C. Balasar of the Porto Football Association's third district league in 2013–14 – though he won a national title in beach soccer with S.C. Braga in 2014.

After two years with F.C. Famalicão, the latter in the Segunda Liga, Novo signed a deal of the same length with G.D. Chaves in the Primeira Liga. Third choice to Ricardo Nunes and António Filipe, he made just one brief substitute appearance in each of his seasons with the team from Trás-os-Montes; the first was on 8 May 2017 in the final matchday (2–1 away loss against G.D. Estoril Praia), in which the latter was sent off with six minutes remaining and he was immediately beaten by a free kick from Mattheus.

On 14 June 2018, Novo returned to Varzim on a two-year deal. The following 1 July, he moved abroad for the first time, joining several compatriots at FC Hermannstadt in Romania. He made his debut in Liga I 18 days later, a 0–2 home defeat to local rivals CS Gaz Metan Mediaș.

Novo came back to his own country's second tier on 4 September 2020, on a one-year deal at F.C. Penafiel. At the end of the campaign, he was on the books of F.C. Felgueiras 1932 for a few weeks before agreeing to a contract at Jeddah Club in the Saudi First Division League.

Novo continued competing in the same country and league the following seasons, with Al-Riyadh SC, Al-Taraji Club and Al-Jandal SC. On 3 January 2026, he signed for K League 2 club Yongin FC; in the process, he became the first foreign goalkeeper to join the league system in 28 years.
