= Lamine Ba =

Lamine Ba may refer to:

- Lamine Bá (footballer, born 1994), Bissau-Guinean footballer
- Lamine Ba (footballer, born 1997), French-born Mauritanian footballer
