= Matheus Pereira (footballer, born 1996) =

Brazilian footballer

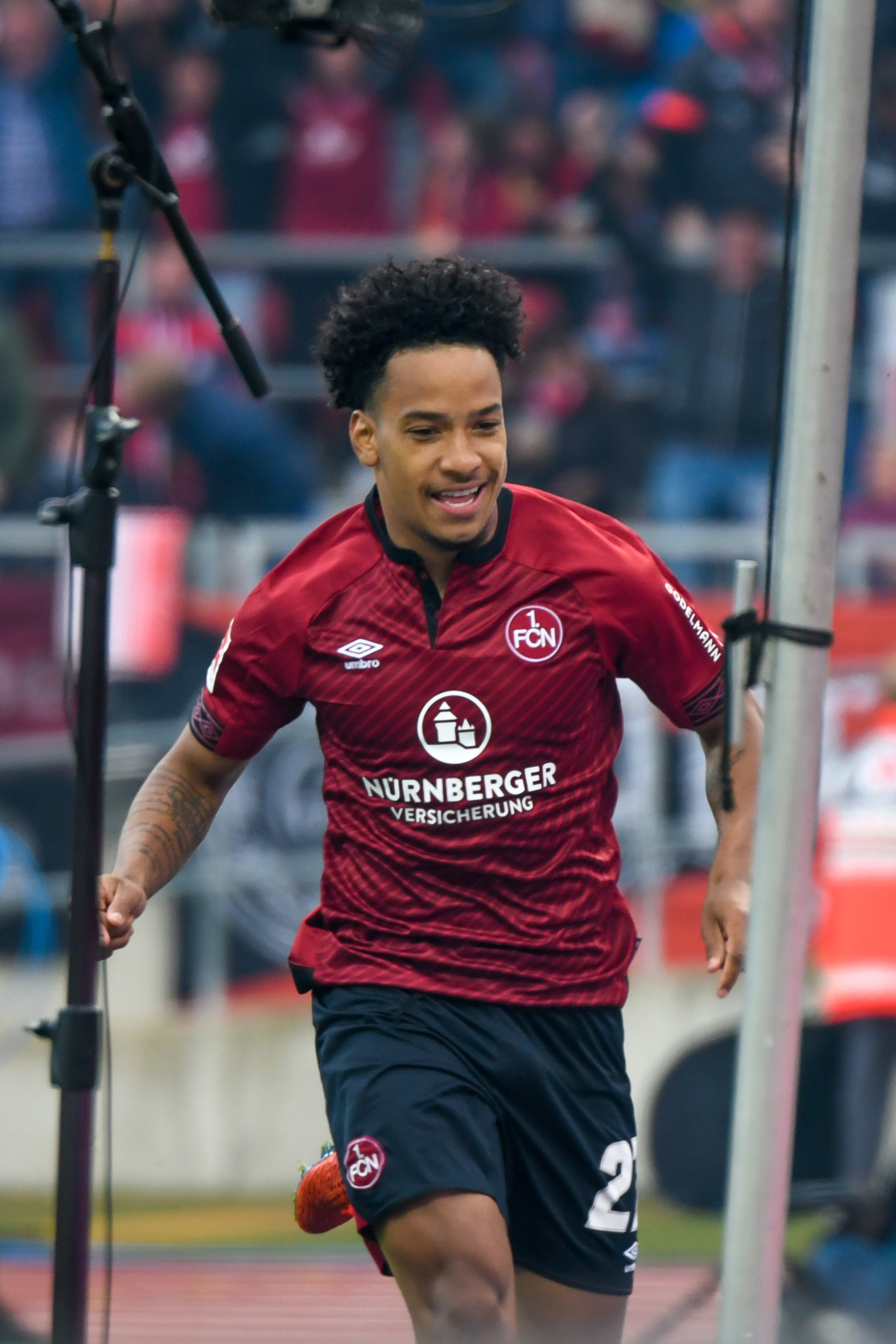
- Pereira with 1. FC Nürnberg in 2019

Personal information
- Full name: Matheus Fellipe Costa Pereira
- Date of birth: 5 May 1996 (age 30)
- Place of birth: Belo Horizonte, Brazil
- Height: 1.75 m (5 ft 9 in)
- Positions: Attacking midfielder; winger

Team information
- Current team: Cruzeiro
- Number: 10

Youth career
- 2007–2010: Trafaria
- 2010–2015: Sporting CP

Senior career*
Years	Team	Apps	(Gls)
2014–2017	Sporting CP B	42	(17)
2015–2020	Sporting CP	15	(1)
2017–2018	→ Chaves (loan)	27	(7)
2018–2019	→ 1. FC Nürnberg (loan)	19	(3)
2019–2020	→ West Bromwich Albion (loan)	42	(8)
2020–2021	West Bromwich Albion	33	(11)
2021–2024	Al Hilal	28	(2)
2023	→ Al Wahda (loan)	10	(1)
2023–2024	→ Cruzeiro (loan)	34	(5)
2024–	Cruzeiro	85	(15)

International career^{‡}
2024–	Brazil	1	(0)
- * Club domestic league appearances and goals as of 9 April 2026 ‡ National team caps and goals as of 12:15, 16 October 2024 (UTC)

Matheus Fellipe Costa Pereira (born 5 May 1996) is a Brazilian professional footballer who plays as an attacking midfielder or right winger for Campeonato Brasileiro Série A club Cruzeiro and the Brazil national team.

== Club career ==
=== Sporting CP ===
Born in Belo Horizonte, Minas Gerais, Pereira moved to Portugal at a young age, joining Sporting CP's youth system at the age of 14. On 18 January 2014, whilst still a junior, he made his debut as a senior with the B team, coming on as a 46th-minute substitute for Cristian Ponde in a 1–1 away draw against C.D. Trofense in the Segunda Liga. He scored his first goal in the competition on 7 March of the following year, contributing to a 4–3 home win over C.D. Tondela.

Early into the 2015–16 season, Pereira was first called to the main squad by newly appointed manager Jorge Jesus. His first competitive appearance took place on 1 October, as he started in a 1–1 draw at Beşiktaş J.K. in the UEFA Europa League. Late in the same month he scored his first goals as a professional, helping defeat U.D. Vilafranquense in the Taça de Portugal (4–0, away) and KF Skënderbeu Korçë in the Europa League (5–1, home), being subsequently selected for the latter competition's team of the week.

Pereira was loaned to fellow Primeira Liga club G.D. Chaves in the 2017–18 campaign. He scored seven league goals during his spell (eight overall), helping them to a sixth-place finish.

On 31 August 2018, the last day of the summer transfer window, Pereira joined 1. FC Nürnberg on loan until the end of the season after criticising José Peseiro's choice of not selecting him to the first match against Moreirense F.C. on social media. He made his Bundesliga debut 16 days later, playing 61 minutes in a 1–1 away draw against SV Werder Bremen.

Pereira scored his first league goal on 30 March 2019, helping the hosts defeat FC Augsburg 3–0. He was nominated for the Bundesliga Rookie of the Season award, but his team suffered relegation after finishing last.

=== West Bromwich Albion ===
On 8 August 2019, Pereira joined West Bromwich Albion on an initial season-long loan with a view to a permanent move. He scored his first goal in the Championship on 28 September, in a 2–0 away win against Queens Park Rangers.

On 20 June 2020, after the player had appeared in the required number of matches, a buyout clause was triggered, obligating the club into Pereira’s purchase. The following month, he won the Supporters’ Player of the Season award after collecting 65% of the votes.

Despite the buyout clause being met months earlier, it took until 17 August 2020 for Pereira to be officially announced as an Albion player, eventually signing a four-year contract. To ensure the player’s focus remained on the field, the board decided to leave the negotiations until after the season had ended.

Pereira made his Premier League debut on 13 September 2020, playing the entire 0–3 home loss against Leicester City. He scored his first goal six days later, through a direct free kick in a 5–2 away defeat to Everton.

On 3 April 2021, Pereira scored a brace in first-half stoppage time in an eventual 5–2 win at Chelsea; this sealed Albion's first victory at Stamford Bridge since 1978, and handed Thomas Tuchel his first loss as the opposition's head coach. On 9 May, his tenth goal of the season – becoming the first club player to get on double digits since Saido Berahino in 2014–15 – amounted to nothing because his team lost 3–1 at Arsenal and confirmed their relegation.

On 1 August 2021, recently appointed manager Valérien Ismaël announced that Pereira would leave the club before the end of the transfer window, accusing him of "not being committed". The following day, the latter released a statement on his social media accounts, confirming that he wished to leave but also expressing anger at the former's comments, branding them "disrespectful".

=== Al Hilal ===
On 6 August 2021, Pereira agreed to a deal with Al Hilal SFC for an undisclosed fee. He scored his first goal for the club the following 6 February, in a 6–1 rout of Al Jazira Club in the second round of the FIFA Club World Cup.

Pereira was loaned to Al Wahda FC of the UAE Pro League in January 2023, until June.

=== Cruzeiro ===
In July 2023, also on loan, Pereira joined Cruzeiro Esporte Clube. He made his Série A debut on 29 July aged 27, in a 3–3 draw at Club Athletico Paranaense. He scored his first goal on 30 November, in the reverse fixture against the same opposition (1–1).

On 17 June 2024, having totalled seven goals and ten assists from 40 appearances until that point, Pereira signed a permanent two-year contract for about €5.5 million. In December that year, he was voted Player of the Year at the Mineirão after leading his team in goals and decisive passes.

== International career ==
On 11 October 2024, Pereira was called up for the Brazil national team to replace Lucas Paquetá, who was suspended for the match against Peru in the 2026 FIFA World Cup qualifiers to be held four days later; he featured 15 minutes in the 4–0 win in Brasília to earn his first cap.

== Career statistics ==
As of 23 December 2025

Club	Season	League			State league (Note: Includes Campeonato Mineiro)		National cup (Note: Includes Taça de Portugal, DFB-Pokal, FA Cup, King's Cup and Copa do Brasil)		League cup (Note: Includes Taça da Liga and EFL Cup)		Continental		Other		Total	
Club	Season	Division	Apps	Goals	Apps	Goals	Apps	Goals	Apps	Goals	Apps	Goals	Apps	Goals	Apps	Goals
Sporting CP B	2013–14	Segunda Liga	4	0	—		—		—		—		—		4	0
Sporting CP B	2014–15	Segunda Liga	12	1	—		—		—		—		—		12	1
Sporting CP B	2015–16	Segunda Liga	12	8	—		—		—		—		—		12	8
Sporting CP B	2016–17	Segunda Liga	14	8	—		—		—		—		—		14	8
Sporting CP B	Total		42	17	—		—		—		—		—		42	17
Sporting CP	2015–16	Primeira Liga	8	0	—		2	2	3	0	5 (Note: Appearances in UEFA Europa League)	3	—		18	5
Sporting CP	2016–17	Primeira Liga	7	1	—		1	0	1	0	0	0	—		9	1
Sporting CP	Total		15	1	—		3	2	4	0	5	3	—		27	6
Chaves (loan)	2017–18	Primeira Liga	27	7	—		1	0	2	1	—		—		30	8
Nürnberg (loan)	2018–19	Bundesliga	19	3	—		2	0	—		—		—		21	3
West Bromwich Albion (loan)	2019–20	Championship	42	8	—		0	0	1	0	—		—		43	8
West Bromwich Albion	2020–21	Premier League	33	11	—		1	1	0	0	—		—		34	12
Al Hilal	2020–21	Saudi Pro League	—		—		—		—		4 (Note: Appearances in AFC Champions League)	0	—		4	0
Al Hilal	2021–22	Saudi Pro League	21	2	—		2	0	—		3	0	4 (Note: One appearance in Saudi Super Cup, three appearances and one goal in FIFA Club World Cup)	1	30	3
Al Hilal	2022–23	Saudi Pro League	7	0	—		1	0	—		0	0	—		8	0
Al Hilal	Total		28	2	—		3	0	—		7	0	4	1	42	3
Al Wahda (loan)	2022–23	UAE Pro League	10	1	—		0	0	0	0	0	0	1 (Note: Appearance in Arab Club Champions Cup)	1	11	2
Cruzeiro	2023	Série A	15	1	—		0	0	—		—		—		15	1
Cruzeiro	2024	Série A	34	8	11	1	1	0	—		13 (Note: Appearances in Copa Sudamericana)	2	—		59	11
Cruzeiro	2025	Série A	34	7	0	0	0	0	—		0	0	—		34	7
Cruzeiro	Total		83	16	11	1	1	0	—		13	2	—		108	19
Career total			299	66	11	1	11	3	7	1	25	5	5	2	324	78

== Honours ==
Al Hilal

- Saudi Pro League: 2021–22
- Saudi Super Cup: 2021
- AFC Champions League: 2021

Cruzeiro

- Campeonato Mineiro: 2026

Individual

- Bola de Prata: 2025
- Campeonato Brasileiro Série A Team of the Year: 2025
- Campeonato Mineiro Team of the Year: 2026
- Troféu Mesa Redonda Team of the Year: 2025
