= João Patrão =

Portuguese footballer

Personal information
- Full name: João Filipe Couto Patrão
- Date of birth: 22 January 1990 (age 36)
- Place of birth: Esposende, Portugal
- Height: 1.75 m (5 ft 9 in)
- Position: Midfielder

Youth career
- 1999–2006: Marinhas
- 2006–2009: Leixões

Senior career*
Years	Team	Apps	(Gls)
2009–2010	Leça	19	(1)
2010–2013	Leixões	23	(0)
2011–2012	→ Macedo Cavaleiros (loan)	27	(0)
2013–2014	Braga B	52	(4)
2014–2018	Chaves	106	(9)
2018–2019	Estoril	27	(0)
2020–2021	Cova Piedade	30	(3)
2021–2022	Lusitânia	12	(0)
2022–2024	Limianos	52	(2)
Total		348	(19)
- * Club domestic league appearances and goals

João Filipe Couto Patrão (born 22 January 1990) is a Portuguese former professional footballer who played as a midfielder.

== Club career ==
Born in Esposende, Braga District, Patrão joined Leixões SC's youth academy in 2006 at the age of 16. He made his senior debut with amateurs Leça F.C. but quickly returned to his previous club, his first appearance as a professional occurring on 15 May 2011 when he came on as a late substitute in a 3–1 home win against S.C. Freamunde in the Segunda Liga, in his only appearance of the season.

Subsequently, Patrão continued to compete in the second division, first with S.C. Braga B then G.D. Chaves. He helped the latter to return to the Primeira Liga in 2016 after a lengthy absence, contributing 34 matches and one goal to the feat and renewing his contract shortly after.

Patrão made his top-flight debut on 24 October 2016, starting the 1–0 away loss to S.C. Braga. He scored his only goal in the competition on 4 December, closing the 1–1 draw against Vitória de Guimarães. Fifteen days later, he was shown a straight red card in injury time of the 2–1 defeat at FC Porto.

After leaving the Estádio Municipal Eng. Manuel Branco Teixeira, Patrão resumed his career in the second tier, signing for G.D. Estoril Praia on 12 June 2018 and joining C.D. Cova da Piedade in December 2019.
