= Latyr Fall =

Senegalese footballer (born 1994)

Personal information
- Date of birth: 19 June 1994 (age 32)
- Place of birth: Saint-Louis, Senegal
- Height: 1.82 m (6 ft 0 in)
- Position: Midfielder

Team information
- Current team: Al-Hussein
- Number: 19

Youth career
- Chaves

Senior career*
Years	Team	Apps	(Gls)
2010–2017	Chaves	0	(0)
2013–2015	→ Pedras Salgadas (loan)	60	(0)
2015–2016	→ Mirandela (loan)	26	(2)
2016–2017	→ Vilaverdense (loan)	32	(11)
2017–2018	Vilaverdense	24	(7)
2018–2020	Académico de Viseu	48	(1)
2020–2022	Feirense	54	(1)
2022–2023	Estrela da Amadora	20	(0)
2023–2024	Kapaz	29	(3)
2024–2025	PSM Makassar	33	(2)
2025–	Al-Hussein	12	(0)
- * Club domestic league appearances and goals as of 2 February 2026

Latyr Fall (born 19 June 1994) is a Senegalese professional footballer who plays as a midfielder for Jordanian Pro League club Al-Hussein.

== Career ==
In 2024–25 season, he appeared with Indonesian club PSM Makassar.
