= José Xavier =

Portuguese footballer

Personal information
- Full name: José Nuno Rodrigues Xavier
- Date of birth: 7 March 1997 (age 29)
- Place of birth: Braga, Portugal
- Height: 1.82 m (5 ft 11 1/2 in)
- Position: Striker

Team information
- Current team: Merelinense (on loan from Braga)
- Number: 33

Youth career
- 2007–2008: Academia Lacatoni
- 2008–2012: Braga
- 2012: Padroense
- 2012–2013: Porto
- 2013–2016: Vitória Guimarães

Senior career*
Years	Team	Apps	(Gls)
2016–2017	Vitória Guimarães B	4	(0)
2017	Chaves	0	(0)
2017	→ Pedras Salgadas (loan)	16	(7)
2017–2018	Wolverhampton Wanderers	0	(0)
2018–2020	Braga	0	(0)
2020	→ Merelinense (loan)	7	(3)
2020–	Maria da Fonte	12	(4)

International career^{‡}
2012	Portugal U16	1	(0)
Medal record
Men's football
Representing Portugal
FIFA U-20 World Cup
Winner	1989 Saudi Arabia
- * Club domestic league appearances and goals as of 09:27, 9 June 2020 (UTC) ‡ National team caps and goals as of 22 November 2012

José Nuno Rodrigues Xavier (born 7 March 1997) is a Portuguese footballer who plays for Campeonato de Portugal league club Maria da Fonte as a forward.

== Football career ==
On 7 February 2016, Xavier made his professional debut with Vitória Guimarães B in a 2015–16 LigaPro match against Olhanense.

On 31 August 2017, he joined English Championship club Wolverhampton Wanderers on a one-year deal.
