= Victor Massaia =

Brazilian footballer

Personal information
- Full name: Victor Guilherme Massaia
- Date of birth: 9 February 1992 (age 34)
- Height: 1.90 m (6 ft 3 in)
- Position: Centre-back

Senior career*
Years	Team	Apps	(Gls)
2011	Goiás	0	(0)
2012–2013	Aparecidense	1	(0)
2013–2016	Sporting Covilhã	99	(0)
2016–2017	Santa Clara	22	(0)
2017–2018	Chaves	10	(0)
2018–2019	Arouca	35	(5)
2019–2020	Cova da Piedade	11	(0)
2020–2021	União Leiria	17	(1)
2021–2022	Motor Lublin	0	(0)
2022–2023	Montalegre	16	(3)
- * Club domestic league appearances and goals as of 18 October 2023

Victor Guilherme Massaia (born 9 February 1992) is a Brazilian professional footballer who plays as a centre-back.

== Club career ==
He made his professional debut in the Segunda Liga for Sporting Covilhã on 21 August 2013 in a game against Tondela. He made his Primeira Liga debut for Chaves on 18 February 2017, when he played the whole game in a 2–0 victory over Arouca.

On 1 September 2021, Victor Massaia signed for II liga club Motor Lublin. After suffering a major knee injury a few weeks after joining Motor, he failed to make an appearance before requesting for his contract to be terminated on 2 March 2022.
