= Perdigão (footballer, born 1991) =

Brazilian footballer

Personal information
- Full name: Jeferson Fernandes Macedo
- Date of birth: 17 July 1991 (age 35)
- Place of birth: São Miguel do Iguaçu, Paraná, Brazil
- Height: 1.80 m (5 ft 11 in)
- Position: Winger

Team information
- Current team: Régua
- Number: 7

Youth career
- 2011: Cianorte

Senior career*
Years	Team	Apps	(Gls)
2011−2013	Tourizense	41	(5)
2013	Braga B	7	(0)
2013−2014	Famalicão	28	(3)
2014−2016	Aves	37	(1)
2016–2019	Chaves	83	(8)
2019	Boavista	12	(1)
2020	Alashkert	5	(0)
2020–2021	Cuiabá	3	(0)
2021	Leiria	5	(0)
2021–2022	Birkirkara	23	(2)
2023	Żebbuġ Rangers	15	(1)
2023–2024	Anadia	25	(2)
2024–	Régua	8	(1)
- * Club domestic league appearances and goals as of 10 November 2024

Jeferson Fernandes Macedo (born 17 July 1991), known as Perdigão, is a Brazilian professional footballer who plays as a winger for Portuguese club Régua.

== Career ==
Born in São Miguel do Iguaçu, Perdigão started competing in Cianorte, from where he moved to Portugal in 2011; joining Tourizense in Portuguese third tier.

His performances led him to a move to S.C. Braga, signing on 30 January 2013, and briefly competing for their reserve squad, debuting on 3 February 2013, in a Segunda Liga match against Tondela.

He was released six months later, and returned to the third tier, signing with Famalicão, adding nearly thirty league caps in the sole season there. In May 2014, Perdigão moved to Desportivo Aves, returning to the Segunda Liga, debuting for his new team on 27 July 2014. After 1 1/2 seasons with Aves, he moved to Chaves and signed a six-month deal. In May 2016, he extended his contract with Chaves for another two seasons.

On 29 July 2020, FC Alashkert announced the signing of Perdigão.
