= Alioune Fall =

Senegalese footballer (born 1994)

Personal information
- Date of birth: 24 December 1994 (age 31)
- Place of birth: Dakar, Senegal
- Height: 1.82 m (6 ft 0 in)
- Positions: Winger; forward

Youth career
- 2011–2012: Étoile Lusitana
- 2012–2013: Chaves

Senior career*
| Years | Team | Apps | (Gls) |
| 2013–2017 | Chaves | 22 | (2) |
| 2013–2014 | → Pedras Salgadas (loan) | 26 | (7) |
| 2014–2015 | → Pedras Salgadas (loan) | 9 | (4) |
| 2015–2016 | → Vizela (loan) | 15 | (7) |
| 2017–2018 | Gil Vicente | 27 | (1) |
| 2018–2020 | Vizela | 48 | (22) |
| 2020–2022 | Beroe | 66 | (20) |
| 2022–2025 | Red Star | 36 | (2) |
- * Club domestic league appearances and goals as of 13 May 2025

Alioune Fall (born 30 August 1994) is a Senegalese professional footballer who plays as a winger and forward.

== Honours ==
Red Star

- Championnat National: 2023–24
