= Lamine Bá (footballer, born 1994) =

Bissau-Guinean footballer

Personal information
- Date of birth: 4 April 1994 (age 32)
- Place of birth: Guinea-Bissau
- Height: 1.91 m (6 ft 3 in)
- Position: Centre-back

Team information
- Current team: Moncarapachense

Youth career
- 2011–2012: Étoile Lusitana
- 2012–2013: Chaves

Senior career*
Years	Team	Apps	(Gls)
2013–2018	Chaves	14	(1)
2013–2014	→ Pedras Salgadas (loan)	4	(0)
2014–2015	→ Pedras Salgadas (loan)	19	(3)
2015–2016	→ Mirandela (loan)	24	(3)
2016–2017	→ AD Oliveirense (loan)	10	(1)
2017	→ Pedras Salgadas (loan)	11	(1)
2018–2019	Pedras Salgadas	25	(1)
2019–2020	SC Ideal	17	(0)
2020–2022	Oriental Dragon	31	(2)
2022–	Moncarapachense	16	(0)

International career^{‡}
2019	Guinea-Bissau	1	(0)
- * Club domestic league appearances and goals as of 15 March 2023 ‡ National team caps and goals as of 23 March 2019

Lamine Bá (born 4 April 1994) is a Bissau-Guinean professional footballer who plays as a centre-back for Portuguese Liga 3 club Moncarapachense. He was capped once for the Guinea-Bissau national team.

== Club career ==
On 4 August 2013, Bá made his professional debut with Chaves in a 2013–14 Taça da Liga match against Moreirense.

== International career ==
Bá made his debut for the Guinea-Bissau national team on 23 March 2019 in an Africa Cup of Nations qualifier against Mozambique, as a starter.
