= António Filipe (footballer, born 1985) =

Portuguese footballer

Personal information
- Full name: António Filipe Norinho de Carvalho
- Date of birth: 14 April 1985 (age 41)
- Place of birth: Foz do Sousa, Portugal
- Height: 1.87 m (6 ft 1 1/2 in)
- Position: Goalkeeper

Team information
- Current team: Malveira

Youth career
- 1996–1997: Crestuma
- 1997–2004: Gondomar

Senior career*
Years	Team	Apps	(Gls)
2004–2009	Gondomar	51	(0)
2009–2015	Paços Ferreira	25	(0)
2015–2019	Chaves	75	(0)
2019–2020	Estoril	2	(0)
2020	Al-Jabalain	19	(0)
2021–2022	Nacional	26	(0)
2022–2024	Estrela Amadora	4	(0)
2024–2025	Académica	28	(0)
2025–	Malveira	0	(0)
- * Club domestic league appearances and goals as of 20:47, 4 October 2025 (UTC)

António Filipe Norinho de Carvalho (born 14 April 1985), known as António Filipe, is a Portuguese professional footballer who plays as a goalkeeper for Campeonato de Portugal club Malveira.

== Club career ==
=== Paços Ferreira ===
Born in Foz do Sousa, Gondomar, Porto District, António Filipe began his career with hometown club Gondomar S.C. in the Segunda Liga. In August 2009, following their relegation, he signed a four-year contract with F.C. Paços de Ferreira. Almost exclusively a backup during his spell at the Estádio da Mata Real, he made his Primeira Liga debut on 12 September 2010 when starter Cássio was sent off shortly before the hour-mark of the 1–1 away draw against C.S. Marítimo.

=== Chaves ===
On 26 June 2015, António Filipe agreed to a one-year deal at second-tier G.D. Chaves. He played a career-best 30 matches (31 overall) in his first season, which ended in promotion, and then extended his link for another year.

In 2017, António Filipe renewed his contract until 30 June 2019. During his tenure, he constantly battled for first-choice status with Ricardo Nunes.

=== Estoril ===
Aged 34, António Filipe joined G.D. Estoril Praia on a one-year deal on 6 June 2019.
