= Fábio Santos (footballer, born 1988) =

Portuguese footballer

Personal information
- Full name: Fábio Manuel Matos dos Santos
- Date of birth: 22 May 1988 (age 38)
- Place of birth: Viseu, Portugal
- Height: 1.85 m (6 ft 1 in)
- Position: Centre back

Youth career
- 1998–2005: Académico Viseu
- 2005–2006: Benfica
- 2006–2007: Académica

Senior career*
Years	Team	Apps	(Gls)
2007–2010	Tourizense	73	(4)
2010−2011	Wohlen	28	(2)
2011–2012	Operário	21	(3)
2012–2013	Leixões	36	(2)
2013–2014	Marítimo B	25	(3)
2013–2014	Marítimo	3	(0)
2014−2015	Beira-Mar	42	(2)
2015−2017	Chaves	38	(1)
2017−2021	Académico Viseu	45	(1)
- * Club domestic league appearances and goals as of 12:20, 5 July 2021 (UTC)

Fábio Manuel Matos dos Santos (born 22 May 1988) is a Portuguese professional footballer who plays as a central defender.
