= Nuno André Coelho =

Portuguese footballer (born 1986)

Personal information
- Full name: Nuno André da Silva Coelho
- Date of birth: 7 January 1986 (age 40)
- Place of birth: Penafiel, Portugal
- Height: 1.93 m (6 ft 4 in)
- Position: Centre-back

Youth career
- 1997–1998: Paredes
- 1998–2004: Penafiel
- 2004–2005: Porto

Senior career*
Years	Team	Apps	(Gls)
2005–2006	Porto B	8	(1)
2006	→ Maia (loan)	14	(0)
2006–2010	Porto	1	(0)
2006–2007	→ Standard Liège (loan)	10	(0)
2007–2008	→ Portimonense (loan)	15	(0)
2008–2009	→ Estrela Amadora (loan)	28	(2)
2010–2011	Sporting CP	9	(0)
2011–2014	Braga	42	(2)
2014–2015	Balıkesirspor	10	(1)
2016	Sporting Kansas City	22	(1)
2017–2019	Chaves	27	(0)
Total		186	(7)

International career
2005–2007	Portugal U20	13	(1)
2006–2008	Portugal U21	14	(2)
2009	Portugal B	1	(0)
2009–2010	Portugal U23	2	(0)
- * Club domestic league appearances and goals

Nuno André da Silva Coelho (Portuguese: [ˈnunu ɐ̃ˈdɾɛ kuˈɐʎu]; born 7 January 1986) is a Portuguese former professional footballer who played as a central defender.

== Club career ==
Born in Penafiel, Coelho reached FC Porto from northern neighbours F.C. Penafiel aged 18, and spent his first professional months with the reserve side, being loaned shortly after to F.C. Maia of the second division. He spent the next three seasons out on loan, to Standard Liège, Portimonense SC, for which he played alongside namesake Nuno Miguel Coelho in the 2007–08 season also in the second tier, and C.F. Estrela da Amadora.

Coelho made his Primeira Liga debut with C.F. Estrela da Amadora on 24 August 2008, playing 90 minutes for C.F. Estrela da Amadora in a 1–0 home win against Académica de Coimbra. In July 2009, he returned to Porto following the retirement of veteran Pedro Emanuel, appearing only once during the league campaign, the 4–1 victory at U.D. Leiria in the last matchday (adding four Taça da Liga games and the first half of the 5–0 away loss to Arsenal in the UEFA Champions League's round-of-16 second leg).

On 4 July 2010, Coelho signed a four-year contract with Sporting CP for €1million, as João Moutinho moved in the opposite direction; the northerners retained 50% of the player's rights. His first official match came on 14 August in a 1–0 defeat at F.C. Paços de Ferreira. On the 26th he scored a rare goal, shooting from 40 metres as the Lions defeated Brøndby IF 3–0 after losing 0–2 at home, thus qualifying for the UEFA Europa League's group stage.

After the end of 2010–11 – where he was used sparingly, often not being selected for matches even when healthy – on 7 June 2011, Coelho was sold to S.C. Braga as an installment deduction on the transfers of João Pereira and Evaldo, agreeing to a four-year deal. His three-year spell in Minho was marred by several injury problems.

Coelho joined Balıkesirspor from Turkey on 5 July 2014, on a three-year deal. On 26 January 2016, after several months without a club, he moved to the Major League Soccer with Sporting Kansas City, scoring from 30 yards in his debut in a 1–0 away win over the Seattle Sounders FC.

On 21 January 2017, Coelho agreed to a short-term contract at G.D. Chaves. He retired two years later at the age of 33, after three seasons as a backup and relegation in his last.

== International career ==
Over roughly two years, Coelho played for the Portugal under-21 team. On 29 August 2010 he was first called to the senior side, for two UEFA Euro 2012 qualifiers against Cyprus and Norway, but did not make his debut.

== Honours ==
Porto

- Taça de Portugal: 2009–10

Braga

- Taça da Liga: 2012–13
