= Bruno Braga =

Portuguese footballer

Personal information
- Full name: Bruno Manuel Araújo Braga
- Date of birth: 17 June 1983 (age 43)
- Place of birth: Massarelos, Portugal
- Height: 1.81 m (5 ft 11 in)
- Position: Midfielder

Youth career
- 1991–1995: Porto
- 1995–2002: Salgueiros

Senior career*
Years	Team	Apps	(Gls)
2002–2004	Salgueiros	27	(0)
2004–2006	Tirsense		
2006–2008	Leça	28	(12)
2008–2010	Leixões	42	(5)
2010–2014	Rio Ave	103	(13)
2014	Benfica Luanda	13	(4)
2015	Penafiel	12	(1)
2015–2017	Chaves	74	(14)
2017–2019	Aves	33	(0)
2019–2020	Leixões	15	(0)
2020–2022	Salgueiros	40	(3)
Total		387	(52)
- * Club domestic league appearances and goals

Bruno Manuel Araújo Braga (born 17 June 1983) is a Portuguese former professional footballer who played as a midfielder.

== Club career ==
Born in Massarelos, Porto District, Braga began his career with his hometown club S.C. Salgueiros, being sparingly used over the course of two Segunda Liga seasons. In 2004, as the organisation was in the midst of a severe financial crisis – which eventually led to its liquidation – he left and signed for F.C. Tirsense, going on to spend several years in the lower leagues; in 2006–07, he helped Leça F.C. promote to the third tier.

Braga moved straight into the Primeira Liga in the summer of 2008, joining Leixões SC. He made his debut in the competition on 24 August by playing 20 minutes in a 1–3 home loss against C.D. Nacional, and finished his debut campaign with 27 matches (22 starts) and five goals as the Matosinhos side finished in sixth position, narrowly missing out on qualification for the UEFA Europa League; two of those came at the Estádio do Dragão in a 3–2 win over FC Porto, as he won the SJPF Player of the Month award for October 2008.

Mainly due to injuries, Braga appeared less in 2009–10, and Leixões suffered relegation. He continued in the top flight, however, signing a one-year contract with Rio Ave FC. He helped the latter team to reach the Taça de Portugal and Taça da Liga finals in 2014, both lost to S.L. Benfica.

== Honours ==
Leça

- Terceira Divisão: 2006–07

Rio Ave

- Taça de Portugal runner-up: 2013–14
- Taça da Liga runner-up: 2013–14

Aves

- Taça de Portugal: 2017–18
- Supertaça Cândido de Oliveira runner-up: 2018
