= Félix Mathaus =

Cape Verdean footballer (born 1990)

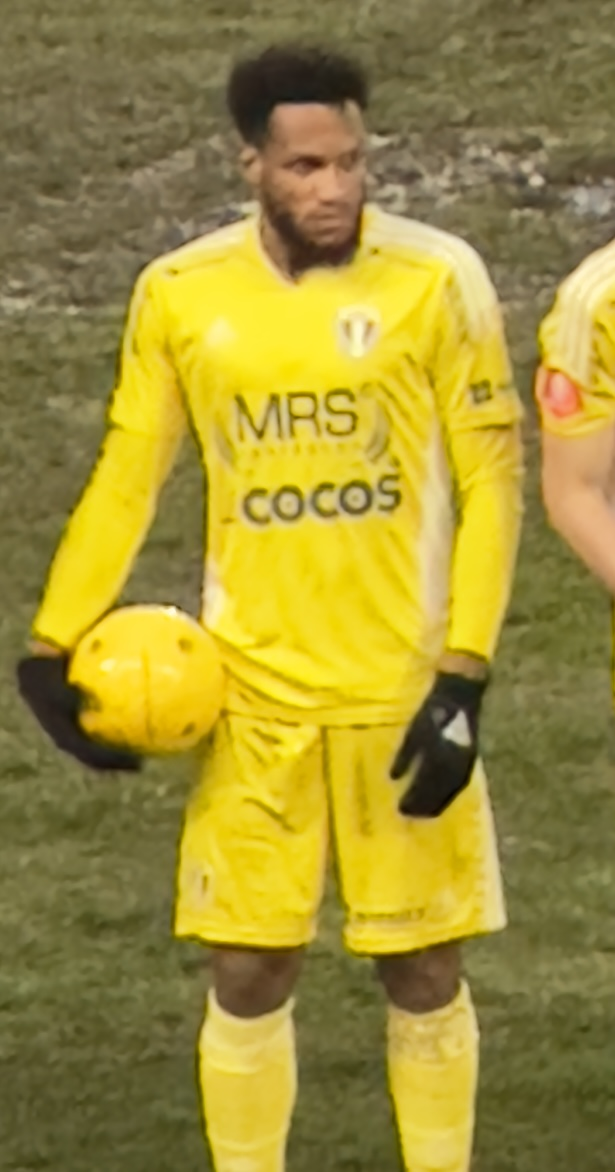
- Mathaus with Petrolul Ploiești in 2023

Personal information
- Full name: Félix Mathaus Lima Santos
- Date of birth: 28 November 1990 (age 35)
- Place of birth: Boa Vista, Cape Verde
- Height: 1.87 m (6 ft 2 in)
- Position: Centre-back

Team information
- Current team: Njarðvík
- Number: 2

Youth career
- Falcões do Norte
- Batuque
- –2013: Tourizense

Senior career*
| Years | Team | Apps | (Gls) |
| 2013–2015 | Tourizense | 28 | (1) |
| 2015–2016 | Académico Viseu | 25 | (2) |
| 2016–2017 | Chaves | 0 | (0) |
| 2017 | → Freamunde (loan) | 0 | (0) |
| 2017–2019 | Oliveirense | 60 | (2) |
| 2019–2021 | Académico Viseu | 53 | (2) |
| 2021–2022 | Gaz Metan Mediaș | 15 | (2) |
| 2022–2023 | Petrolul Ploiești | 25 | (2) |
| 2023–2024 | Chania | 6 | (0) |
| 2024–2025 | Niki Volos | 14 | (0) |
| 2026– | Njarðvík | 12 | (0) |

International career
| 2017–2020 | Cape Verde | 0 | (0) |
- * Club domestic league appearances and goals as of 14 October 2026

Félix Mathaus Lima Santos (born 28 November 1990) is a Cape Verdean professional footballer who plays as a centre-back for Icelandic 1. deild karla club Njarðvík.

== Club career ==
=== Early life and career ===
Hailing from a modest background in Cape Verde, Félix Mathaus began to play football to help provide for his family. He came up through the Tourizense youth academy and was promoted to the senior team in 2013, which played in the third-tier Campeonato de Portugal at the time. Over the next two seasons, Félix Mathaus made 28 league appearances for Tourizense, scoring one goal.

In July 2015, Félix Mathaus signed a one-year contract with second-tier club Académico Viseu. He then made his professional debut on 6 September by playing a full 90 minutes in a 1–0 win against Santa Clara, and scored his first professional goal in a 1–0 win against Varzim on 24 October. Félix Mathaus scored two goals in 25 league appearances for the club. His play attracted the attention of Chaves, who signed him to a three-year contract in 2016. Félix Mathaus was sidelined for several months with a serious injury. His lone appearance for Chaves was a Taça da Liga match against Rio Ave where he played 120 minutes and they lost on penalties. Félix Mathaus was subsequently loaned out to Freamunde in January 2017. However, he was found to have not sufficiently recovered from his injury and the loan was cancelled just a few days later.

In July 2017, Félix Mathaus signed a two-year deal with Oliveirense. He scored his maiden goal for Oliveirense in a 2–1 home win over his former club, Académico Viseu, on 7 October 2017. Félix Mathaus netted again against Académico Viseu on 28 January 2019, this time scoring his side's first goal via a header in a 5–3 home win. He made a total of 60 league appearances over two seasons with Oliveirense.

=== Académico Viseu ===
In June 2019, Félix Mathaus returned to his former club Académico Viseu, signing a two-year contract (with a player option for a third year). He helped the team reach the semifinals of the 2019–20 Taça de Portugal; his performance in the first leg of the semi-final, a 1–1 draw against Porto, was praised as an "impeccable" 90 minutes of defense by Cape Verdean newspaper A Nação. In the second leg, Félix Mathaus conceded a penalty after pushing fellow countryman Zé Luís, which was converted by Alex Telles, as Académico Viseu suffered a 0–3 loss.

On 27 September 2020, Félix Mathaus scored via a header in the opening minutes of a 1–1 draw at Arouca. He scored again that year on 19 December, netting in the 85th minute to spark a 2–1 comeback win over Chaves. Félix Mathaus scored two goals in 53 total league appearances over two seasons before announcing his departure from the club in July 2021.

=== Gaz Metan Mediaș ===
After parting ways with Académico Viseu, Félix Mathaus joined Romanian side Gaz Metan Mediaș on a free transfer in July 2021, marking his first time on a club outside Portugal. He made his club and Liga I debut the following week, coming on as a second-half substitute for Gabriel Moura in a 1–0 home win over Mioveni on 17 July. Félix Mathaus made his first start in their next game, a 0–2 loss at Farul Constanța on 25 July. However, he suffered a serious knee injury soon thereafter and underwent surgery in Bucharest, sidelining him for six months.

Financial mismanagement by the club led to a mass player exodus and the resignation of manager Ilie Poenaru on 17 February 2022. Félix Mathaus made his return from injury the following day, coming on as a second-half substitute for Raul Șteau in a 0–4 loss to Dinamo București. The player exodus left him as the only reserve player on the squad born before 2003, and he took over the captain's armband soon thereafter. Félix Mathaus scored his first goal for Gaz Metan Mediaș on 11 April, recording an 80th minute game-winner via a header for a 2–1 win over Mioveni. He scored another game-winning header the following month, netting a goal in the 87th minute for a 4–3 win over Academica Clinceni in their final play-out round game on 6 May to close out the season.

This would be the last game in the history of the club, which filed for bankruptcy after the season due to outstanding debts. Félix Mathaus was not paid for several months, causing him to file a complaint with the Romanian Football Federation (FRF), which ruled in his favor and released him from his contract with Gaz Metan Mediaș. In an interview with Romanian newspaper Gazeta Sporturilor, he later confirmed that he had to live off of previous wages saved from his time in Portugal. Félix Mathaus also joked that he would quit football and work in construction if he ever heard about another club bankruptcy, because "at least I work there and get paid a living wage".

=== Petrolul Ploiești ===
On 9 July 2022, Félix Mathaus joined newly-promoted Liga I side Petrolul Ploiești, just one week before the start of the 2022–23 season. The deal was subsequently finalized in late September and confirmed as being for two years. Félix Mathaus made his club debut on 28 September, starting in a 4–0 Cupa României win over 1599 Șelimbăr. He made his league debut three days later – starting in a 0–1 loss to CFR Cluj on 1 October – and scored his first goal for the club in a 1–4 loss to FCSB on 2 March 2023. Félix Mathaus netted again the following month, scoring his side's second goal via a header in a 2–0 win over Mioveni on 10 April. He made 25 league appearances, all as a starter, and scored two goals in the 2022–23 season.

== International career ==
In October 2017, Félix Mathaus received his first call-up to the Cape Verde national team from manager Lúcio Antunes ahead of a World Cup qualifying game against Burkina Faso. He remained an unused substitute on the bench. In May 2018, Félix Mathaus received another call-up, this time from manager Rui Águas, ahead of a pair of friendly matches against Algeria and Andorra. He did not appear in either game.

In November 2020, Félix Mathaus was again called up ahead of a pair of 2021 Africa Cup of Nations qualifying games against Rwanda. He was one of six players who received the last-minute call-up after the same amount were dropped from the squad due to injuries and COVID-19 pandemic-related issues. Félix Mathaus trained with the squad under manager Bubista, but failed to appear in either game against Rwanda.

== Personal life ==
Félix Mathaus was born on the island of Boa Vista, Cape Verde. Due to withheld wages from Gaz Metan Mediaș and Petrolul Ploiești, he borrowed money to build a house in his native country. Félix Mathaus is Muslim and learned Romanian during his recovery from injury in 2022 by speaking with the nurses.
