= Rafael Batatinha =

Brazilian footballer

Personal information
- Full name: Rafael Batatinha dos Santos
- Date of birth: 9 February 1990 (age 36)
- Place of birth: Senhor do Bonfim, Brazil
- Height: 1.82 m (5 ft 11 1/2 in)
- Position: Forward

Senior career*
| Years | Team | Apps | (Gls) |
| 2011 | Bahia | 0 | (0) |
| 2011–2012 | Anadia | 14 | (11) |
| 2012 | Tondela | 16 | (11) |
| 2012–2014 | Beira-Mar | 31 | (3) |
| 2014–2015 | Tondela | 18 | (2) |
| 2015–2016 | Santa Clara | 79 | (15) |
| 2017–2018 | Chaves | 10 | (0) |
| 2017–2018 | → Gil Vicente (loan) | 11 | (0) |
| 2018 | Santa Clara | 11 | (1) |
| 2019 | Cascavel | 5 | (2) |
| 2019–2020 | Loures | 15 | (0) |
- * Club domestic league appearances and goals as of 1 March 2020

Rafael Batatinha dos Santos (born 9 February 1990 in Senhor do Bonfim, Bahia), known as Rafael Batatinha, is a Brazilian professional footballer who plays as a forward.
