= Estádio Municipal Eng. Manuel Branco Teixeira =

Stadium in Chaves, Portugal

Coordinates: 41.7506°N 7.46499°W

Municipal Eng. Manuel Branco Teixeira
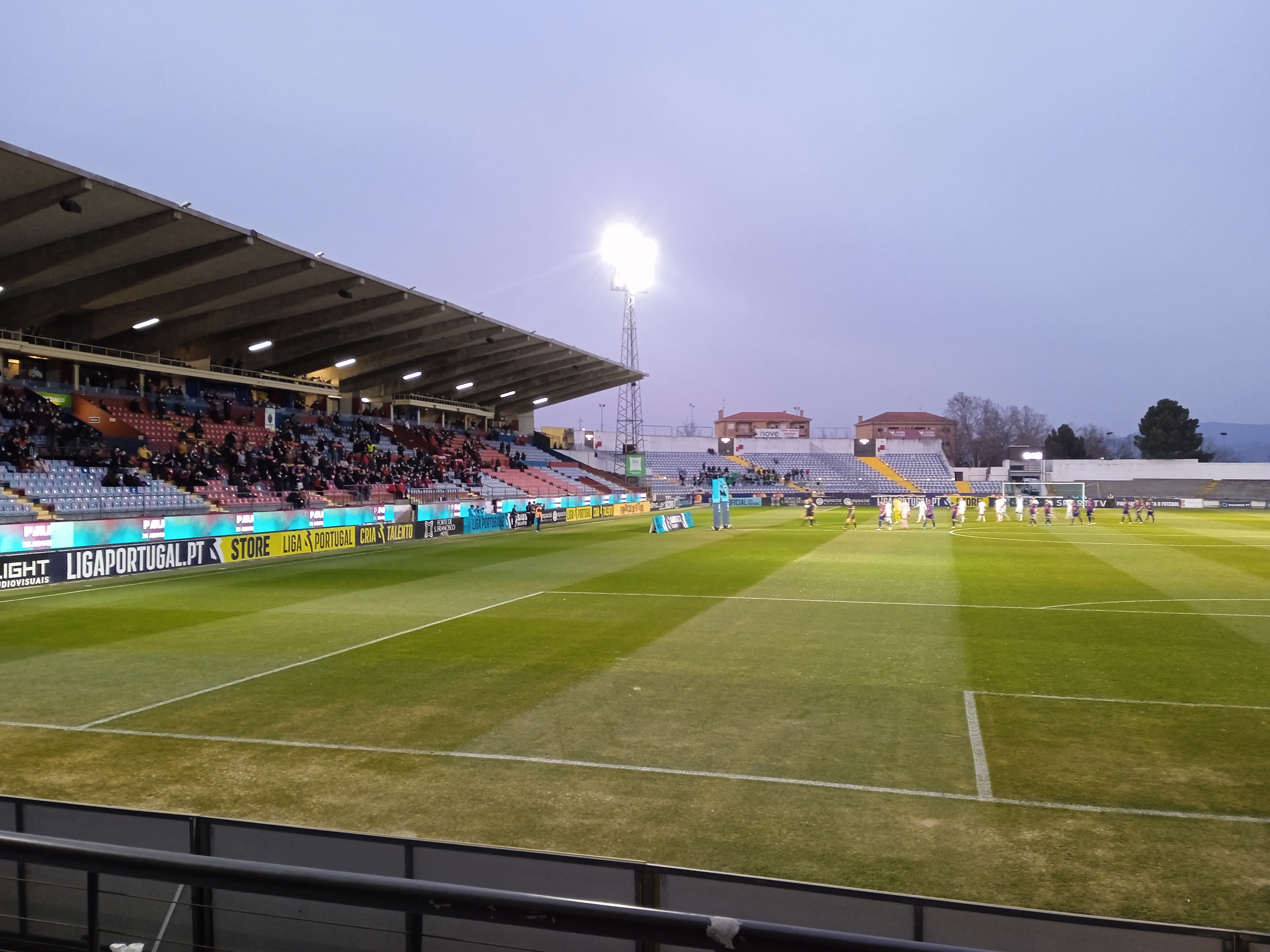
- Interactive map of Municipal Eng. Manuel Branco Teixeira
- Full name: Estádio Municipal Eng. Manuel Branco Teixeira
- Former names: Estádio Municipal de Chaves
- Location: Chaves, Portugal
- Owner: Chaves Municipality
- Capacity: 8,400
- Surface: Grass
- Record attendance: 25,000 (10 November 1985); G.D. Chaves 0–1 S.L. Benfica
- Field size: 105 x 68 metres

Construction
- Built: 1949
- Opened: 1949
- Architect: Nuno Magalhães

Tenant
- GD Chaves (1949–present)

The Estádio Municipal Eng. Manuel Branco Teixeira is a multi-use stadium in Chaves, Portugal. It is currently used mostly for football matches and is the home stadium of GD Chaves. The stadium is able to hold 8,400 people.

The stadium normally holds the national teams' youth games and also some U21 games and also the senior team but rarely. Cristiano Ronaldo made his debut for the Portugal national team against Kazakhstan in 2003, at the stadium.

== Portugal national team matches ==
The following national team matches were held in the stadium.

#	Date	Score	Opponent	Competition
1.	2 June 2000	3–0	Wales	Friendly
2.	20 August 2003	1–0	Kazakhstan	Friendly

== See also ==
- List of football stadiums in Portugal
