= Ricardo Nunes (footballer, born 1982) =

Portuguese footballer

Ricardo
Personal information
- Full name: Ricardo Jorge Novo Nunes
- Date of birth: 6 July 1982 (age 44)
- Place of birth: Póvoa de Varzim, Portugal
- Height: 1.90 m (6 ft 3 in)
- Position: Goalkeeper

Youth career
- 1992–2001: Varzim

Senior career*
Years	Team	Apps	(Gls)
2001–2003	Fradelos		
2003–2007	Varzim	46	(1)
2007–2014	Académica	77	(0)
2008–2009	→ União Leiria (loan)	15	(0)
2014–2015	Porto B	8	(0)
2014–2017	Porto	0	(0)
2015–2016	→ Vitória Setúbal (loan)	24	(0)
2016–2017	→ Chaves (loan)	24	(0)
2017–2020	Chaves	44	(0)
2020–2024	Varzim	112	(1)
Total		350	(2)
- * Club domestic league appearances and goals

Ricardo Jorge Novo Nunes (born 6 July 1982), known simply as Ricardo, is a Portuguese former professional footballer who played as a goalkeeper. He is the chairman of Varzim.

== Club career ==
Born in Póvoa de Varzim, Ricardo joined his local club Varzim SC's youth system at the age of 10. He made his senior debut with amateurs Grupo Desportivo Fradelos before returning in 2003, going on to compete four seasons in the Segunda Liga, the last two as first choice. In March 2006, during a match against Moreirense FC, he scored from goal to goal to give his team the win.

Ricardo moved to the Primeira Liga for 2007–08, with Académica de Coimbra. He played his first game in the competition on 24 November 2007 in a 1–3 home loss against S.L. Benfica, in what was his only appearance of the campaign. During his first years, he served as backup to Pedro Roma and Frenchman Romuald Peiser respectively, but, on 19 May 2012, started in the final of the Taça de Portugal against Sporting CP, helping to a 1–0 win for the Students' first in the competition in 73 years.

In 2012–13, Ricardo became the starter under manager Pedro Emanuel. He played 37 matches in all competitions, retaining his post under new boss Sérgio Conceição.

In late May 2014, free agent Ricardo signed a three-year contract with FC Porto in the same league. He was only third choice in his first season, and subsequently served top-tier loans at Vitória F.C. and G.D. Chaves.

Ricardo joined Chaves on a permanent three-year deal on 18 May 2017, after becoming a free agent. In August 2019, he announced he was putting his career on hold due to cancer. After surgery in September, he returned to work in December.

On 3 June 2020, Ricardo returned to Varzim after 13 years away. The following 20 March, he scored from a long clearance in a 2–0 home victory over C.D. Mafra.

Ricardo retired in April 2024, aged 41. On 25 May, he was elected president of his last club.

== Honours ==
Académica

- Taça de Portugal: 2011–12
- Supertaça Cândido de Oliveira runner-up: 2012
