= Juventude de Pedras Salgadas =

Portuguese sports club

- Founded: 1977; 48 years ago
- Ground: Estádio da Portelinha, Pedras Salgadas
- Capacity: 3500
- League: Campeonato de Portugal
- 2021–22: Campeonato de Portugal Serie A, 5th (First stage); Relegation Serie B, 1st (Second stage)

Juventude de Pedras Salgadas is a Portuguese sports club from Pedras Salgadas.

== History ==
Since 2021, the men's football team has acted, once again, as a farm team for G.D. Chaves, and plays in the Campeonato de Portugal, the fourth tier of Portuguese football. This was the third tier of Portuguese football in 2020–21, when Pedras Salgadas also played there. In the Taça de Portugal, Pedras Salgadas among others knocked Académica out of the 2018–19 edition.
