= G.D. Chaves =

Portuguese professional football club

Chaves
- Full name: Grupo Desportivo de Chaves
- Nicknames: Flavienses; Valentes; Trasmontanos
- Short name: GDC
- Founded: 27 September 1949; 77 years ago
- Stadium: Estádio Municipal Eng. Manuel Branco Teixeira
- Capacity: 8,400
- Owner: GLS Promotoría del Deporte
- President: Dante Elizalde
- Head coach: Vítor Martins
- League: Liga Portugal 2
- 2025–26: Liga Portugal 2, 9th of 18
- Website: gdchaves.pt
Home colours	Away colours	Third colours

Grupo Desportivo de Chaves (Portuguese pronunciation: [ˈʃavɨʃ]), commonly known as Chaves, is a Portuguese professional football club from Chaves, who are playing in the Liga Portugal 2. They were founded in 1949 and currently play at Estádio Municipal Eng. Manuel Branco Teixeira. Their home kit is red-and-blue striped shirt with blue shorts and socks, and the away kit is all white. Their current president is Bruno Carvalho and their manager is Moreno. Chaves have competed in the Portuguese First Division 18 times and had their best finish of fifth-place in the 1989–90 season. They went to Europe in the 1987–88 season, where they played in the UEFA Cup, beating Romanian side Universitatea Craiova in the first round and losing to Hungarian team Budapest Honvéd in the next round.

== History ==
Grupo Desportivo de Chaves was founded on 27 September 1949 and is one of the most experienced teams in the Portuguese Second Division, not just because of its old culture, but also many years in the top-flight Primeira Liga, doing quite well and playing in European tournaments, such as the UEFA Cup. Their best ever finish was in the Primeira Liga when they finished fifth in both 1986–87 and 1989–90. In the 1986–87 season, meanwhile, they had fantastic results, beating Sporting Clube de Portugal 2–1 at home in the Estádio Municipal de Chaves. After those seasons, they finished sixth, seventh and ninth before getting relegated in the 1992–93 season to the Liga de Honra. They returned for another few seasons but then again suffered relegation to the Liga de Honra until 2007, where they eventually got relegated to the Portuguese Second Division: Série A. In the previous season of 2007–08, they finished in fourth place, just missing out on promotion.

After a series of great results in 2008–09 that granted the team the lead of Série A, Chaves finally achieved promotion to the second-flight Liga de Honra with an aggregate 1–0 win over Penafiel, the winner of the Portuguese Second Division: Série B in a semi-final playoff. In the playoff final, it was between Chaves and Fátima, in which both were guaranteed promotion to the Liga de Honra, with the final set to determine the champions. Fátima won the match 2–1. Chaves spent the following three years in the third division before being crowned Segunda Divisão champions in 2012–13, thus gaining promotion back to the Segunda Liga. After missing out on promotion to the first division during a thrilling final day of the 2014–15 season, Chaves were promoted the following season back to the top-flight Primeira Liga for the first time in 17 years.

In September 2025, G.D. Chaves was purchased by the Mexican company GLS Promotoría del Deporte, owned by tequila entrepreneur Arturo Lomelí. This company also owns Atlético La Paz, club of the Liga de Expansión MX, the second tier of Mexican football. After the purchase, Francisco José Carvalho stepped down as club president, which was then taken over by Mexican lawyer Dante Elizalde, who had previously presided over Santos Laguna in Liga MX.

== Stadium ==
Estádio Municipal Eng. Manuel Branco Teixeira is a multi-use stadium in Chaves. It is currently used mostly for football matches and is the home stadium of G.D. Chaves. The stadium is able to hold 8,400 people. The stadium normally holds the Portugal national team youth games and also some under-21 games, and also very rarely the senior team. This stadium is famous because it is where Cristiano Ronaldo made his senior international debut with Portugal.

== Honours ==
- Portuguese Second Division
  - Champions (2): 2008–09, 2012–13
- Taça de Portugal
  - Runners-up (1): 2009–10

== Players ==
=== Current squad ===
As of 16 September 2026

Note: Flags indicate national team as defined under FIFA eligibility rules; some limited exceptions apply. Players may hold more than one non-FIFA nationality.

No.	Pos.	Nation	Player
1	GK	POR	João Valido
2	DF	PAN	Anthony Herbert (on loan from Árabe Unido)
3	DF	ESP	Aarón Romero
4	DF	POR	Bruno Rodrigues
5	DF	POR	Kiko
6	MF	CMR	Brice Eboudjé
7	FW	NED	Robyn Esajas
8	MF	POR	João Teixeira
9	FW	BRA	Marquinhos (on loan from Maguary)
10	MF	POR	André Rodrigues
11	MF	POR	Pedro Pelágio
13	DF	MEX	Ivo Vázquez
14	DF	MEX	Néstor Araujo
16	MF	ENG	Dru Yearwood
17	FW	POR	Roberto
18	FW	CPV	Wilson Tavares
19	MF	MEX	Gilberto García

No.	Pos.	Nation	Player
22	MF	MOZ	Keyns Abdala
23	DF	BRA	Léo Alaba
27	FW	ESP	Armando Jr
29	DF	MLI	Mamadou Tounkara
30	FW	POR	Costinha
31	GK	BRA	Rodrigo Moura
33	DF	POR	Tiago Simões
34	DF	POR	Ricardo Alves
42	MF	CPV	Aílson Tavares
50	MF	CAN	Lucas Lima
60	MF	COD	Divin Muteba
70	MF	POR	Di Cardoso
80	MF	CIV	Mohamed Fofana
88	GK	SRB	Marko Gudžulić
94	GK	POR	Thiago Pereira
99	FW	BRA	GB (on loan from Vasco da Gama)

=== Out on loan ===
Note: Flags indicate national team as defined under FIFA eligibility rules; some limited exceptions apply. Players may hold more than one non-FIFA nationality.

No. / Pos. / Nation / Player; — / MF / BRA / João Pedro (at Paredes until 30 June 2027)	No. / Pos. / Nation / Player; — / FW / BRA / Paulo Victor (at América Mineiro until 31 December 2026)

== Notable players ==
- (Portugal) Paulo Torres
- (Cape Verde) Vozinha

== Managerial history ==
Name	Nationality	Years
Raul Águas	Portugal	1984–1988
João Fonseca	Portugal	1988–1989
José Romão	Portugal	1989–1990
Manuel Barbosa	Portugal	1990–1991
José Romão	Portugal	1991–1992
Henrique Calisto	Portugal	1992–1993
Carlos Garcia	Portugal	1993
António Jesus	Portugal	1993–1994
Vítor Urbano	Portugal	1994–1995
José Romão	Portugal	1995–1996
Joaquim Teixeira	Portugal	1996
José Romão	Portugal	1996–1997
Manuel Correia	Portugal	1997–1998
Porfírio Amorim	Portugal	1998
Álvaro Magalhães	Portugal	1998
Horácio Gonçalves	Portugal	1998–1999
Augusto Inácio	Portugal	1999
Diamantino Bráz	Portugal	1999
Francisco Vital	Portugal	1999–2000
Dito	Portugal	2000
António Jesus	Portugal	2000–2001
António Borges	Portugal	2001–2002
Rogério Gonçalves	Portugal	2002–2003
José Alberto Costa	Portugal	2003
Manuel Correia	Portugal	2003–2004
Daniel Ramos	Portugal	2004
António Amaral	Portugal	2004–2005

Name	Nationality	Years
Vítor Maçãs	Portugal	2005
António Caldas	Portugal	2005–2006
Ricardo Formosinho	Portugal	2006
António Borges	Portugal	2006–2008
Leonardo Jardim	Portugal	2009
Emerson Carvalho	Brazil	2009
Ricardo Formosinho	Portugal	2009
Nuno Pinto	Portugal	2009–2010
Tulipa	Portugal	2010
Jorge Regadas	Portugal	2010
Luís Miguel	Portugal	2010–2011
João Eusébio	Portugal	2011
Filipe Casanova	Portugal	2011
Jorge Regadas	Portugal	2011–2012
Eduardo Oliveira	Portugal	2012
Hélder Fontes	Portugal	2012
Pedro Monteiro	Portugal	2012–2013
João Pinto	Portugal	2013
João Eusébio	Portugal	2013
Quim Machado	Portugal	2013–2014
Norton de Matos	Portugal	2014
Carlos Pinto	Portugal	2014–2015
Vítor Oliveira	Portugal	2015–2016
Jorge Simão	Portugal	2016
Ricardo Soares	Portugal	2016–2017
Luís Castro	Portugal	2017–2018
Daniel Ramos	Portugal	2018

Name	Nationality	Years
Tiago Fernandes	Portugal	2018–2019
José Mota	Portugal	2019
César Peixoto	Portugal	2019–2020
Carlos Pinto	Portugal	2020–2021
Vítor Campelos	Portugal	2021–2023
José Gomes	Portugal	2023
Moreno	Portugal	2023–2024
Filipe Martins	Portugal	2025–2026
Vítor Martins	Portugal	2026–

== Europe ==
Season	Cup	Round	Opponent	Result	(1st leg)	Result	(2nd leg)	Aggregate	Notes
1987–88	UEFA Cup	1st round	(Romania) Universitatea Craiova	2 – 3	Away (16/09)	2 – 1	Home (30/09)	4 – 4 (a)
1987–88	UEFA Cup	2nd round	(Hungary) Budapest Honvéd	1 – 2	Home (24/10)	1 – 3	Away (04/11)	2 – 5

== League and cup history ==
The football section has 13 presences at the top level of Portuguese football. Its best position was two fifth-place finished, in the 1986–87 and 1989–90 seasons, the first earning Chaves its only presence in the European cups.

=== Domestic results ===
6

5

7

13

5

8

9

18
↓

3
↑

14

15

10

16

17
↓

12

12

5

7

10

17

8

16
↓

4

1
↑

15
↓

3

3

1
↑

8

3

2
↑

11

6

16
↓

12

6

3
↑

7

18
↓

86
87
88
89
90
91
92
93
94
95
96
97
98
99
00
01
02
03
04
05
06
07
08
09
10
11
12
13
14
15
16
17
18
19
20
21
22
23
24

Primeira Liga*	Liga Portugal 2	Liga 3/Campeonato de Portugal

↓ relegation
↑ promotion

Season	Div	Pos	Pld	W	D	L	GF	GA	Pts	Portuguese Cup	Portuguese League Cup	Europe	Notes
1985–86	I	6	30	11	7	12	28	38	29	Quarter-Finals	—		
1986–87	I	5	30	13	7	10	39	38	33	Quarter-Finals	—		
1987–88	I	7	38	13	14	11	51	31	40	Third Round	—	Round 2	
1988–89	I	13	38	12	10	16	37	41	34	Quarter-Finals	—		
1989–90	I	5	34	12	14	8	38	38	38	Fifth Round	—		
1990–91	I	8	38	10	14	14	49	52	34	Third Round	—		
1991–92	I	9	34	10	10	14	36	45	30	Sixth Round	—		
1992–93	I	18	34	4	8	22	34	61	16	Fifth Round	—		Relegated
1993–94	II	3	34	19	7	8	44	25	45	Sixth Round	—		Promoted
1994–95	I	14	34	10	7	17	33	49	27	Fourth Round	—		
1995–96	I	15	34	9	7	8	38	56	34	Fourth Round	—		
1996–97	I	10	34	12	10	12	39	45	46	Fifth Round	—		
1997–98	I	16	34	10	5	19	31	55	35	Fifth Round	—		
1998–99	I	17	34	5	10	19	39	70	25	Fourth Round	—		Relegated
1999–00	II	12	34	11	11	12	46	45	44	Third Round	—		
2000–01	II	12	34	9	14	11	48	44	41	Third Round	—		
2001–02	II	5	34	16	4	14	52	44	52	Third Round	—		
2002–03	II	7	34	12	11	11	44	41	47	Sixth Round	—		
2003–04	II	10	34	11	11	12	37	45	44	Third Round	—		
2004–05	II	17	34	9	10	15	24	38	37	Fourth Round	—		
2005–06	II	8	34	13	11	10	40	36	50	Third Round	—		
2006–07	II	16	30	3	7	20	16	43	16	Third Round	—		Relegated
2007–08	III	4	26	12	8	6	44	17	44	Fourth Round	—		
2008–09	III	1	32	19	8	5	53	22	87	Third Round	—		Promoted
2009–10	II	15	30	6	10	14	28	37	28	Runners-up	First Round		Relegated
2010–11	III	3	30	13	12	5	34	21	51	First Round	—		
2011–12	III	3	30	15	9	6	41	26	54	Third Round	—		
2012–13	III	1	32	17	11	4	46	23	62	Second Round	—		Promoted
2013–14	II	8	42	19	10	13	58	56	67	Fourth Round	First Round		
2014–15	II	3	46	20	20	6	68	45	80	Fifth Round	Second Round		
2015–16	II	2	46	21	18	7	60	39	81	Fourth Round	First Round		Promoted
2016–17	I	11	34	8	14	12	35	42	38	Semi-finals	Second Round		
2017–18	I	6	34	13	8	13	47	55	47	Fourth Round	Second Round		
