= 2013–14 Vitória F.C. season =

In 2013–14, Vitória de Setúbal will compete in the Primeira Liga, Taça de Portugal and Taça da Liga.

== Primeira Liga ==
18 August 2013 Match 1	Vitória de Setúbal	1–3	Porto	Setúbal
21:00	Martins 14'; Bruninho (yellow card) 24'; Cardozo (yellow card) 37'; Dani (yellow card) 48'; Kieszek (red card) 49'; Pedroso (yellow card) 80'	Summary	Fernando (yellow card) 38'; Josué 49' (pen.), (yellow card) 49'; Quintero 61'; Alex Sandro (yellow card) 84'; Martínez 89'	Stadium: Estádio do Bonfim; Attendance: 6,219; Referee: (Portugal) João Capela

25 August 2013 Match 2	Rio Ave	2–0	Vitória de Setúbal	Vila do Conde
17:00	Lionn 9'; Braga (yellow card) 43'; Koka 50' (pen.); Edimar (yellow card) 74'	Summary	Martins (yellow card) 41'; Terroso (yellow card) 50'	Stadium: Estádio do Rio Ave FC; Attendance: 1,524; Referee: (Portugal) Cosme Cunha Machado

31 August 2013 Match 3	Vitória de Guimarães	1–4	Vitória de Setúbal	Guimarães
19:00	Addy (yellow card) 18'; Matias (yellow card) 20', (goal) 45'; Gomes (yellow card) 78'	Summary	Tavares 20' (pen.); Cohene 55'; Cardozo 59', 67'; Vezo (yellow card) 75' (yellow-red card) 84'	Stadium: Estádio D. Afonso Henriques; Attendance: 10,064; Referee: (Portugal) Marco Ferreira

15 September 2013 Match 4	Vitória de Setúbal	2–4	Marítimo	Setúbal
17:00	Terroso (yellow card) 45'; Cohene (yellow card) 53'; Danilo 56' (o.g.); Martins 90+1'	Summary	Héldon 50'; Derley 56', 88'; Sá (yellow card) 61'; Dias 65'; João Diogo (yellow card) 66'	Stadium: Estádio do Bonfim; Attendance: 3,304; Referee: (Portugal) Artur Soares Dias

23 September 2013 Match 5	Paços de Ferreira	1–1	Vitória de Setúbal	Paços de Ferreira
21:15	António Filipe (yellow card) 24'; Arnolin (yellow card) 25' (yellow-red card) 71'; Caetano (yellow card) 77'; Ricardo 82'	Summary	Queirós (yellow card) 15'; Cardozo 17', (yellow card) 85'; Dani (yellow card) 27'; Pedroso (yellow card) 66'	Stadium: Estádio da Mata Real; Attendance: 1,826; Referee: (Portugal) Jorge Ferreira

30 September 2013 Match 6	Vitória de Setúbal	2–2	Gil Vicente	Setúbal
21:15	Martins 2'; Tavares 23'; Queirós (yellow card) 35'; Dani (yellow card) 69'	Summary	Moraes 5'; Vilela 58'; Halisson (yellow card) 90'	Stadium: Estádio do Bonfim; Attendance: 1,212; Referee: (Portugal) Hugo Filipe Ferreira de Campos Moreira Miguel

5 October 2013 Match 7	Sporting CP	4–0	Vitória de Setúbal	Lisbon
21:15	Montero 40', 71'; Carrillo 58'; Adrien 74' (pen.)	Summary	Cohene (yellow card) 73'	Stadium: Estádio José Alvalade; Attendance: 32,573; Referee: (Portugal) Duarte Gomes

26 October 2013 Match 8	Vitória de Setúbal	0–0	Belenenses	Setúbal
21:15	Vezo (yellow card) 45+4'; Cohene (yellow card) 55'; Miguel Pedro (red card) 87'	Summary	Diakité (yellow card) 70'; Ferreira (yellow card) 90'	Stadium: Estádio do Bonfim; Attendance: 2,214; Referee: (Portugal) Cosme Cunha Machado

3 November 2013 Match 9	Estoril	0–2	Vitória de Setúbal	Estoril
17:00	João Pedro (yellow card) 64'	Summary	Miguel Pedro (yellow card) 22'; Queirós (yellow card) 33'; Bruninho (yellow card) 43'; Tavares 64' (pen.); Martins (yellow card) 83'; Terroso 90+2'; Horta (yellow card) 90+2'	Stadium: Estádio António Coimbra da Mota; Attendance: 2,317; Referee: (Portugal) Jorge de Sousa

24 November 2013 Match 10	Vitória de Setúbal	1–0	Arouca	Setúbal
17:00	Cardozo 34'; Pedroso (yellow card) 53'; Vezo (red card) 56'	Summary	Ceballos (yellow card) 33'; Bruno Amaro (yellow card) 66'	Stadium: Estádio do Bonfim; Attendance: 2,285; Referee: (Portugal) João Capela

1 December 2013 Match 11	Nacional	2–2	Vitória de Setúbal	Funchal
17:00	Rondón 14', 37'; Júnior (yellow card) 57'	Summary	Bruninho 7', (yellow card) 7'; Cohene (yellow card) 27' (goal) 82'; Dani (yellow card) 76'	Stadium: Estádio da Madeira; Attendance: 1,987; Referee: (Portugal) Olegário Benquerença

9 December 2013 Match 12	Vitória de Setúbal	1–0	Académica de Coimbra	Setúbal
21:15	Miguel Pedro (yellow card) 6'; Tiba (yellow card) 29'; Horta 73'; Santos (yellow card) 90+3'	Summary	Magique (yellow card) 28'; Halliche (red card) 90+3'	Stadium: Estádio do Bonfim; Attendance: 1,415; Referee: (Portugal) Manuel Mota

14 December 2013 Match 13	Braga	2–0	Vitória de Setúbal	Braga
19:00	Micael 13'; Vezo 89' (o.g.)	Summary	Vezo (yellow card) 31'; Dani (yellow card) 90'; Rosado (yellow card) 90'	Stadium: Estádio Municipal de Braga; Attendance: 8,064; Referee: (Portugal) Carlos Xistra

20 December 2013 Match 14	Vitória de Setúbal	0–2	Benfica	Setúbal
22:00	Tiba (yellow card) 36'; Dani (yellow card) 68'; Cardozo (yellow card) 86'; Pedroso (yellow card) 90+1'	Summary	Fejsa (yellow card) 45'; Rodrigo 54'; Lima 69' (pen.)	Stadium: Estádio do Bonfim; Attendance: 4,415; Referee: (Portugal) Paulo Baptista

12 January 2014 Match 15	Olhanense	2–1	Vitória de Setúbal	Olhão Municipality
17:00	Luís Filipe (yellow card) 29'; Mehmeti 38'; Celestino (yellow card) 65'; Dionisi 67'; Koné (yellow card) 90+1'	Summary	Cardozo 9'; Santos (yellow card) 76'	Stadium: Estádio Algarve; Attendance: 1,285; Referee: (Portugal) Jorge Joaquim Martins de Barros Tavares

19 January 2014 Match 16	Porto	3–0	Vitória de Setúbal	Porto
20:15	Martínez 10'; Helton (yellow card) 26'; Varela 34'; Carlos Eduardo 85'	Summary	Pedroso (yellow card) 23'; Miguel Pedro (yellow card) 52'; François (yellow card) 77'; Kieszek (yellow card) 80'	Stadium: Estádio do Dragão; Attendance: 24,209; Referee: (Portugal) Hugo Rodrigues Pacheco

1 February 2014 Match 17	Vitória de Setúbal	2–0	Rio Ave	Setúbal
19:00	Martins 1', 31' (pen.), (yellow card) 9'; Queirós (yellow card) 37'; Tiba (yellow card) 53'	Summary	Ribeiro (yellow card) 11'; Marcelo (yellow card) 30'; Edimar (yellow card) 35' (yellow-red card) 70'; Lopes (yellow card) 38' (yellow-red card) 69'	Stadium: Estádio do Bonfim; Attendance: 1,703; Referee: (Portugal) Marco Ferreira

8 February 2014 Match 18	Vitória de Setúbal	3–2	Vitória de Guimarães	Setúbal
21:00	Horta 6'; Venâncio (yellow card) 22'; Cardozo 65'; Martins 69'; François (yellow card) 72' (yellow-red card) 74'; Santos (yellow card) 79'; Kieszek (yellow card) 90+3'; Miguel Pedro (yellow card) 90+4'	Summary	Olímpio (yellow card) 15'; Addy (yellow card) 39'; Crivellaro 75'; Plange 83'; Douglas (yellow card) 89'	Stadium: Estádio do Bonfim; Attendance: 1,687; Referee: (Portugal) Jorge de Sousa

16 February 2014 Match 19	Marítimo	1–0	Vitória de Setúbal	Funchal
17:00	Rocha 68'; Gegé (yellow card) 79'	Summary	Venâncio (yellow card) 42'; Horta (yellow card) 66'; Santos (yellow card) 83'; Ozéia (yellow card) 90+4'	Stadium: Estádio dos Barreiros; Attendance: 2,400; Referee: (Portugal) Rui Silva

23 February 2014 Match 20	Vitória de Setúbal	4–0	Paços de Ferreira	Setúbal
17:00	Tony 46' (o.g.); Zequinha 57'; Martins 67', 74' (pen.)	Summary	Boaventura (yellow card) 45'; Valente (yellow card) 85'	Stadium: Estádio do Bonfim; Attendance: 2,190; Referee: (Portugal) Artur Soares Dias

2 March 2014 Match 21	Gil Vicente	1–0	Vitória de Setúbal	Barcelos, Portugal
17:00	Vinha (yellow card) 63'; Peixoto 73' (pen.); Danielson (yellow card) 85'; Mosquera (yellow card) 90'; Paulinho (yellow card) 90+4'	Summary	João Mário (yellow card) 45'; Pedroso (yellow card) 48'; Ozéia (yellow card) 72' (yellow-red card) 83'; Zequinha (yellow card) 74'; Tiba (yellow card) 87'	Stadium: Estádio Cidade de Barcelos; Attendance: 2,239; Referee: (Portugal) Carlos Miguel Taborda Xistra

9 March 2014 Match 22	Vitória de Setúbal	2–2	Sporting CP	Setúbal
18:00	Martins 51'; Horta 89' (pen.); François (yellow card) 90+2'	Summary	Slimani 34', (yellow card) 55'; Rojo (yellow card) 40'; Maurício (yellow card) 57'; Adrien 86' (pen.)	Stadium: Estádio do Bonfim; Attendance: 11,136; Referee: (Portugal) Vasco Santos

16 March 2014 Match 23	Belenenses	1–3	Vitória de Setúbal	Lisbon
17:00	Afonso (yellow card) 43'; Caeiro 66'	Summary	Dani (yellow card) 25'; Martins 33', 86'; Horta (yellow card) 49', (goal) 71'; Pedroso (yellow card) 57'; João Mário (yellow card) 63'; Rosado (yellow card) 89'	Stadium: Estádio do Restelo; Attendance: 1,654; Referee: (Portugal) Rui Manuel Gomes Costa

24 March 2014 Match 24	Vitória de Setúbal	1–1	Estoril	Setúbal
21:00	João Mário (yellow card) 22'; Horta 33'; Miguel Pedro (yellow card) 45+1'; Queirós (yellow card) 50'; François (yellow card) 53'; Martins (yellow card) 59'; Rosado (yellow card) 69'	Summary	Tavares (yellow card) 28'; Gomes (yellow card) 31'; Evandro (red card) 41'; Santos (yellow card) 69'; João Pedro 72'	Stadium: Estádio do Bonfim; Attendance: 2,100; Referee: (Portugal) Jorge Ferreira

30 March 2014 Match 25	Arouca	1–0	Vitória de Setúbal	Arouca Municipality
17:00	Tinoco (yellow card) 61'; Galo (yellow card) 65'; Nouioui 73'	Summary	Coronas (red card) 25'; João Mário (yellow card) 66'; Venâncio (yellow card) 85'	Stadium: Estádio Municipal; Attendance: 1,226; Referee: (Portugal) Artur Soares Dias

6 April 2014 Match 26	Vitória de Setúbal	3–0	Nacional	Setúbal
18:00	Martins 2' (pen.), 38'; Horta (yellow card) 65', (goal) 68'	Summary	Sousa (yellow card) 2'; Gomaa (yellow card) 30'; J. Aurélio (yellow card) 57'; Marçal (yellow card) 66'; Faife (yellow card) 74'; Candeias (red card) 75'; Rodrigues (yellow card) 90+1'	Stadium: Estádio do Bonfim; Attendance: 5,200; Referee: (Portugal) Hugo Rodrigues Pacheco

11 April 2014 Match 27	Académica de Coimbra	1–1	Vitória de Setúbal	Coimbra
21:00	Marcos Paulo 33' (pen.); Real (yellow card) 39'; Valente (yellow card) 70'; Ivanildo (yellow card) 76'	Summary	Martins 27'; Queirós (yellow card) 33'; Pedroso (yellow card) 36'; Miguel Pedro (yellow card) 54'; François (red card) 59'	Stadium: Estádio Cidade de Coimbra; Attendance: 3,489; Referee: (Portugal) Luís Ferreira

21 April 2014 Match 28	Vitória de Setúbal	1–1	Braga	Setúbal
19:00	Tiba 80'	Summary	Éder 12'; Eduardo (red card) 26'	Stadium: Estádio do Bonfim; Attendance: 2,124; Referee: (Portugal) Hugo Miguel

4 May 2014 Match 29	Benfica	1–1	Vitória de Setúbal	Lisbon
19:00	Gomes 60'; Pérez (yellow card) 73'; Pereira (yellow card) 75'; Gaitán (yellow card) 87'	Summary	Martins 75' (pen.); Tavares (yellow card) 82'; Ozéia (yellow card) 90'	Stadium: Estádio da Luz; Attendance: 52,325; Referee: (Portugal) Duarte Gomes

10 May 2014 Match 30	Vitória de Setúbal	3–1	Olhanense	Setúbal
17:00	Zequinha 2'; Venâncio (yellow card) 37' (goal) 67'; Horta (yellow card) 40'; Pedroso (yellow card) 45'; Tiba (yellow card) 79'; Martins 89'	Summary	Dioisi 14'; Krøldrup (yellow card) 29' (yellow-red card) 34'; Souza (yellow card) 31'	Stadium: Estádio do Bonfim; Attendance: 1,692; Referee: (Portugal) Pedro Proença

== League table ==
Pos	Team	Pld	W	D	L	GF	GA	GD	Pts	Qualification or relegation
5	Nacional	30	11	12	7	43	33	+10	45	Qualification to Europa League play-off round
6	Marítimo	30	11	8	11	40	44	−4	41	
7	Vitória de Setúbal	30	10	9	11	41	41	0	39	
8	Académica	30	9	10	11	25	35	−10	37 (Note: Académica ahead of Braga on head-to-head record; Académica–Braga 1–1, Braga–Académica 0–1)	
9	Braga	30	10	7	13	39	37	+2	37	

Source: LPFP (in Portuguese)
Rules for classification: 1) Points; 2) Head-to-head points; 3) Head-to-head goal difference; 4) Head-to-head away goals scored; 5) Goal difference; 6) Matches won; 7) Goals scored; 8) Play-off.
(Note: LPFP decided that only criteria 1, 5, 6 and 7 would be applied to establish the classification during the competition.)

== Taça da Liga ==
12 October 2012 Second Round 1st Leg	Portimonense	2–2	Vitória de Setúbal	Portimão
18:00	Semedo (yellow card) 25'; Pessoa 38' (pen.), 45+1' (pen.); Nicolau (yellow card) 42' (yellow-red card) 56'; Moreno (yellow card) 90+3'	Summary	Tavares 25' (pen.) 43' (pen.); Dani (yellow card) 51'; Rosado (yellow card) 66'	Stadium: Estádio Municipal de Portimão; Attendance: 990; Referee: (Portugal) Luís Ferreira

30 October 2012 Second Round 2nd Leg	Vitória de Setúbal	1–0 (3–2 agg.)	Portimonense	Setúbal
19:00	Vezo 6'; Horta (yellow card) 53'; Tiba (yellow card) 90+1'; Santos (yellow card) 90+3'	Summary	Gomes (yellow card) 26'; Luís Pedro (yellow card) 45+1'; Kanazaki (yellow card) 90+1'	Stadium: Estádio do Bonfim; Attendance: 930; Referee: (Portugal) Bruno Alexandre da Silva Esteves

=== Third round ===
==== Group A ====
Pos	Team	Pld	W	D	L	GF	GA	GD	Pts	Qualification
1	Rio Ave	3	2	1	0	6	2	+4	7	Advance to knockout phase
2	Paços de Ferreira	3	2	0	1	4	3	+1	6	
3	Vitória de Setúbal	3	1	1	1	2	3	−1	4	
4	Sporting da Covilhã	3	0	0	3	2	6	−4	0	

8 January 2014 Match 1	Vitória de Setúbal	1–0	Covilhã	Setúbal
19:00	Terroso (yellow card) 47'; Santos (yellow card) 53'; Pedroso (yellow card) 81' (yellow-red card) 83'; Venâncio 90'	Summary	Kakuba (yellow card) 15'; Lopes (yellow card) 60'; Carlos Manuel (red card) 90+3'	Stadium: Estádio do Bonfim; Attendance: 574; Referee: (Portugal) Nuno Miguel Serrano Almeida

15 January 2014 Match 2	Rio Ave	1–1	Vitória de Setúbal	Vila do Conde
19:30	Lopes (yellow card) 47'; Vilas Boas (yellow card) 84'; Joeano 84'	Summary	Pedroso 23'; Bruninho (yellow card) 30'; Venâncio (yellow card) 41'; Cardozo (yellow card) 57'; Horta (yellow card) 72' (red card) 84'; Dani (yellow card) 90+5'	Stadium: Estádio do Rio Ave FC; Attendance: 687; Referee: (Portugal) Rui Manuel Gomes Costa

26 January 2014 Match 3	Paços de Ferreira	2–0	Vitória de Setúbal	Paços de Ferreira
16:00	Buval 11'; Tony (yellow card) 29'; Lopes (yellow card) 58'; Oliveira 90+2'	Summary	François (yellow card) 28'; Cardozo (yellow card) 39'; Kiko (red card) 45'; Martins (yellow card) 70'; Dani (yellow card) 88'; Tiba (yellow card) 90+1'	Stadium: Estádio da Mata Real; Attendance: 1,233; Referee: (Portugal) Olegário Benquerença

== Taça de Portugal ==
20 October 2013 Round 3	Vitória de Setúbal	3–1	AC Alcanenense	Setúbal
16:00		Summary		Stadium: Estádio do Bonfim

10 November 2013 Round 4	Vitória de Setúbal	2–1	Santa Maria	Setúbal
17:00	Cohene 18', (yellow card) 74'; Cardozo 45'; Kiko (yellow card) 87'	Summary	Alex (yellow card) 70', (goal) 84'	Stadium: Estádio do Bonfim; Attendance: 1,600; Referee: (Portugal) Nuno Miguel Serrano Almeida

4 January 2014 Last 16	Rio Ave	1–0	Vitória de Setúbal	Vila do Conde
18:00	Lopes (yellow card) 26'; Ukra 90+2' (pen.)	Summary	Rosado (yellow card) 24'; Kiko (yellow card) 31'; Miguel Pedro (yellow card) 67'; Queirós (yellow card) 75'; Dani (yellow card) 81' (yellow-red card) 90+1'	Stadium: Estádio do Rio Ave FC; Attendance: 700; Referee: (Portugal) Luís Guimarães

== Current squad ==
As of 16 August 2013. Note: Flags indicate national team as defined under FIFA eligibility rules; some limited exceptions apply. Players may hold more than one non-FIFA nationality.

No.	Pos.	Nation	Player
1	GK	POL	Paweł Kieszek
2	DF	KOR	Kang Min-woo
3	DF	POR	Frederico Venâncio
4	DF	POR	Miguel Lourenço
5	DF	PAR	Javier Cohene
6	DF	POR	Rúben Vezo
7	MF	POR	Gonçalo Graça
8	MF	POR	Paulo Tavares
9	FW	POR	Jorginho
10	FW	POR	Miguel Pedro
11	FW	POR	Bruninho
15	DF	POR	Nélson Pedroso

No.	Pos.	Nation	Player
16	MF	POR	Tiago Terroso
17	MF	POR	Pedro Coronas
20	DF	POR	Kiko
22	GK	BRA	Adilson
24	DF	POR	Pedro Queirós
27	FW	PAR	Ramón Cardozo
28	MF	POR	Diogo Rosado
40	DF	SEN	François
66	MF	POR	Dani
68	MF	BRA	Ney Santos
89	FW	BRA	Bruninho
99	FW	BRA	Rafael Martins
