= List of Portuguese football transfers summer 2013 =

This is a list of Portuguese football transfers for the summer of 2013. The summer transfer window opened on 1 July and closed at midnight on 2 September. Players may be bought before the transfer windows opens, but may only join their new club on 1 July. Only moves involving Primeira Liga clubs are listed. Additionally, players without a club may join a club at any time.

== Transfers ==
Date	Name	Moving from	Moving to	Fee
17 December 2012	(Mexico) Diego Reyes	(Mexico) Club América	(Portugal) Porto	€7,000,000
9 January 2013	(Brazil) Hebert	(Brazil) Vasco da Gama	(Portugal) Braga	Undisclosed
15 January 2013	(Angola) Lunguinha	(Angola) Kabuscorp	(Portugal) Vitória de Setúbal	Loan
17 January 2013	(Mexico) Héctor Herrera	(Mexico) Pachuca	(Portugal) Porto	Undisclosed
31 January 2013	(Ivory Coast) Kódjo Alphonse	(Portugal) Mirandela	(Portugal) Gil Vicente	Free
6 February 2013	(Portugal) Hugo Basto	(Portugal) Varzim	(Portugal) Braga	Free
12 February 2013	(Portugal) Pedro Mendes	(Portugal) Sporting CP	(Italy) Parma	Free
15 February 2013	(Serbia) Miralem Sulejmani	(Netherlands) Ajax	(Portugal) Benfica	Free
23 February 2013	(Serbia) Filip Đuričić	(Netherlands) Heerenveen	(Portugal) Benfica	€6,000,000
1 March 2013	(Brazil) Rafael Porcellis	(Portugal) Santa Clara	(Portugal) Braga	Free
6 March 2013	(Portugal) Pedro Santos	(Portugal) Vitória Setúbal	(Portugal) Braga	Free
7 March 2013	(Portugal) Beto	(Portugal) Braga	(Spain) Sevilla	€1,000,000
12 March 2013	(Brazil) Luíz Carlos	(Portugal) Paços de Ferreira	(Portugal) Braga	Undisclosed
19 March 2013	(Portugal) Luís Silva	(Portugal) Leixões	(Portugal) Braga	Free
21 March 2013	(Portugal) Nuno Sequeira	(Portugal) Leixões	(Portugal) Nacional	Free
23 March 2013	(Netherlands) Ricky van Wolfswinkel	(Portugal) Sporting CP	(England) Norwich City	€10,000,000
4 April 2013	(Portugal) Romeu	(Portugal) Desportivo das Aves	(Portugal) Paços de Ferreira	Free
16 April 2013	(Colombia) Felipe Pardo	(Colombia) Independiente Medellín	(Portugal) Braga	Undisclosed
16 April 2013	(Portugal) Tiago Rodrigues	(Portugal) Vitória de Guimarães	(Portugal) Porto	Undisclosed
16 April 2013	(Portugal) Ricardo	(Portugal) Vitória de Guimarães	(Portugal) Porto	Undisclosed
29 April 2013	(Paraguay) Jorge Rojas	(Paraguay) Cerro Porteño	(Portugal) Benfica	€1,200,000
29 April 2013	(Portugal) Rafa	(Portugal) Penafiel	(Portugal) Nacional	Undisclosed
3 May 2013	(Portugal) Adilson	(Portugal) Atlético	(Portugal) Belenenses	Free
7 May 2013	(Serbia) Stefan Mitrović	(Belgium) Kortrijk	(Portugal) Benfica	€1,100,000
15 May 2013	(Brazil) Cássio	(Portugal) Paços de Ferreira	(Portugal) Braga	Free
21 May 2013	(Portugal) Edinho	(Spain) Málaga	(Portugal) Braga	Free
22 May 2013	(Brazil) Jefferson	(Portugal) Estoril	(Portugal) Sporting CP	€400,000
22 May 2013	(Portugal) Rúben Fernandes	(Portugal) Portimonense	(Portugal) Estoril	Free
22 May 2013	(Serbia) Uroš Matić	(Slovakia) Košice	(Portugal) Benfica	Free
23 May 2013	(Portugal) Vítor Gonçalves	(Portugal) Portimonense	(Portugal) Gil Vicente	Free
23 May 2013	(Brazil) Carlos Eduardo	(Portugal) Estoril	(Portugal) Porto	€800,000
23 May 2013	(Portugal) Hugo Viana	(Portugal) Braga	(United Arab Emirates) Al Ahli Dubai	Free
23 May 2013	(Brazil) Bruno Nascimento	(Portugal) Estoril	(Germany) 1. FC Köln	Undisclosed
24 May 2013	(Portugal) João Moutinho	(Portugal) Porto	(France) AS Monaco	€25,000,000
24 May 2013	(Colombia) James Rodríguez	(Portugal) Porto	(France) AS Monaco	€45,000,000
25 May 2013	(Algeria) El Arbi Soudani	(Portugal) Vitória de Guimarães	(Croatia) Dinamo Zagreb	€900,000
27 May 2013	(Nigeria) Simy	(Portugal) Portimonense	(Portugal) Gil Vicente	Free
27 May 2013	(Portugal) Filipe Gonçalves	(Portugal) Moreirense	(Portugal) Estoril Praia	Free
28 May 2013	(Brazil) Gabriel	(Portugal) Penafiel	(Portugal) Gil Vicente	Free
29 May 2013	(Brazil) Leandro Salino	(Portugal) Braga	(Greece) Olympiacos	Free
29 May 2013	(Portugal) Licá	(Portugal) Estoril	(Portugal) Porto	Undisclosed
29 May 2013	(Portugal) Josué	(Portugal) Paços de Ferreira	(Portugal) Porto	Undisclosed
30 May 2013	(Portugal) Ricardo Gomes	(Portugal) Vizela	(Portugal) Vitória de Guimarães	Free
30 May 2013	(Cape Verde) Ely Fernandes	(Portugal) Fátima	(Portugal) Gil Vicente	Free
31 May 2013	(Portugal) Ricardo Fernandes	(Portugal) Belenenses	(Portugal) Torreense	Loan
31 May 2013	(Portugal) Luís Gonçalves	(Portugal) Belenenses	(Portugal) Torreense	Loan
31 May 2013	(Portugal) Rodrigo Parreira	(Portugal) Belenenses	(Portugal) Torreense	Loan
31 May 2013	(Portugal) Ricardo Carvalho	(Portugal) Vitória de Guimarães	(Portugal) Benfica	Undisclosed
31 May 2013	(Portugal) Jota	(Portugal) Vitória de Guimarães	(Portugal) Benfica	Undisclosed
31 May 2013	(Portugal) Didi	(Portugal) Vitória de Guimarães	(Portugal) Benfica	Undisclosed
31 May 2013	(Portugal) Pedro Alves	(Portugal) Vitória de Guimarães	(Portugal) Benfica	Undisclosed
1 June 2013	(Portugal) Vitorino Antunes	(Portugal) Paços de Ferreira	(Spain) Málaga	€1,250,000
1 June 2013	(Burkina Faso) Djibril	(Portugal) Naval	(Portugal) Braga	Free
1 June 2013	(Portugal) Filipe Godinho	(Portugal) 1º de Dezembro	(Portugal) Olhanense	Free
2 June 2013	(Cape Verde) Babanco	(Portugal) Olhanense	(Portugal) Estoril	Free
2 June 2013	(Portugal) Rui Sacramento	(Portugal) Leixões	(Portugal) Arouca	Free
2 June 2013	(Portugal) Tinoco	(Portugal) Naval	(Portugal) Arouca	Free
2 June 2013	(São Tomé and Príncipe) Harramiz	(Portugal) União Montemor	(Portugal) Benfica	€15,000
3 June 2013	(Portugal) Marcos Valente	(Portugal) Penafiel	(Portugal) Benfica	Free
4 June 2013	(Brazil) Cristiano	(Portugal) Vitória de Setúbal	(Brazil) Nacional	Free
5 June 2013	(Portugal) Danilo Castro	(Portugal) Vitória de Guimarães	(Portugal) Varzim	Free
6 June 2013	(Brazil) Bruno Moraes	(Hungary) Újpest	(Portugal) Gil Vicente	Free
6 June 2013	(Portugal) Pedró	(Portugal) Freamunde	(Portugal) Gil Vicente	Free
6 June 2013	(Guinea-Bissau) Sancidino Silva	(Portugal) Benfica	(Portugal) Académico de Viseu	Loan
8 June 2013	(Portugal) Pintassilgo	(Portugal) Moreirense	(Portugal) Arouca	Free
9 June 2013	(Brazil) Rodrigo Antônio	(Portugal) Marítimo	(Portugal) Paços de Ferreira	Free
9 June 2013	(United States) Caleb Patterson-Sewell	(Portugal) Vitória de Setúbal	(Portugal) Gil Vicente	Free
9 June 2013	(Serbia) Lazar Marković	(Serbia) Partizan Belgrade	(Portugal) Benfica	Undisclosed
10 June 2013	(Portugal) Amido Baldé	(Portugal) Vitória de Guimarães	(Scotland) Celtic	€1,000,000
10 June 2013	(Portugal) Tiago Targino	(Portugal) Olhanense	(Cyprus) AEL Limassol	Free
10 June 2013	(Brazil) Welthon	(Brazil) Grêmio Anápolis	(Portugal) Braga	Loan
11 June 2013	(Portugal) Joãozinho	(Portugal) Beira-Mar	(Portugal) Braga	Free
11 June 2013	(France) Valentin Roberge	(Portugal) Marítimo	(England) Sunderland	Free
11 June 2013	(Serbia) Filip Marković	(Serbia) Partizan Belgrade	(Portugal) Benfica	Free
13 June 2013	(Portugal) Salvador Agra	(Spain) Real Betis	(Portugal) Braga	Loan
11 June 2013	(Portugal) Diogo Viana	(Portugal) Penafiel	(Portugal) Gil Vicente	Free
11 June 2013	(Cape Verde) João Vicente	(Portugal) Arouca	(Portugal) Tondela	Free
12 June 2013	(Portugal) Ricardo Fernandes	(Portugal) União da Madeira	(Portugal) Marítimo	Free
12 June 2013	(Portugal) Luciano Teixeira	(Portugal) Benfica	(France) Metz	Free
12 June 2013	(Portugal) Flávio Ferreira	(Portugal) Académica de Coimbra	(Spain) Málaga	€750,000
13 June 2013	(Ivory Coast) Amessan	(Portugal) Académica de Coimbra	(Cyprus) AEL Limassol	Free
14 June 2013	(France) Bédi Buval	(Denmark) Vejle Kolding	(Portugal) Académica de Coimbra	Free
14 June 2013	(Brazil) João Guilherme	(Portugal) Marítimo	(Cyprus) APOEL	Free
15 June 2013	(Nigeria) Chidi Osuchukwu	(Nigeria) Dolphins	(Portugal) Braga	Free
16 June 2013	(Portugal) Steven Vitória	(Portugal) Estoril	(Portugal) Benfica	Free
17 June 2013	(Portugal) Sandro	(Portugal) Gil Vicente	(Portugal) Moreirense	Free
17 June 2013	(Portugal) Daniel Gonçalves	(Portugal) Tourizense	(Portugal) Marítimo	Free
17 June 2013	(Angola) Pana	(Portugal) Tourizense	(Portugal) Marítimo	Free
17 June 2013	(Brazil) Alemão	(Portugal) Tourizense	(Portugal) Marítimo	Free
17 June 2013	(Portugal) João Pedro	(Portugal) Gil Vicente	(Portugal) Penafiel	Free
18 June 2013	(Portugal) Tiago Duque	(Portugal) Benfica	(Portugal) Belenenses	Free
18 June 2013	(Morocco) Issam El Adoua	(Portugal) Vitória de Guimarães	(Spain) Levante	Free
19 June 2013	(Portugal) Paulinho	(Portugal) Trofense	(Portugal) Gil Vicente	Free
19 June 2013	(Portugal) Miguel Ângelo	(Portugal) Arouca	(Portugal) Chaves	Free
19 June 2013	(Ghana) Wakaso	(Portugal) Portimonense	(Portugal) Rio Ave	Free
19 June 2013	(Portugal) Jorge Chula	(Portugal) Sporting CP	(Portugal) Marítimo	Free
19 June 2013	(United States) Tony Taylor	(Portugal) Estoril	(Cyprus) Omonia	Free
19 June 2013	(Portugal) Tiago Duque	(Portugal) Belenenses	(Portugal) Torreense	Loan
19 June 2013	(Cameroon) Gaël Etock	(Portugal) Sporting CP	(Belgium) Cercle Brugge	Free
19 June 2013	(Portugal) Artur	(Ukraine) Chornomorets Odesa	(Portugal) Marítimo	Loan
20 June 2013	(Portugal) Sérgio Oliveira	(Portugal) Porto	(Portugal) Paços de Ferreira	Free
20 June 2013	(Portugal) Igor Pita	(Portugal) Marítimo	(Portugal) União da Madeira	Free
20 June 2013	(Brazil) Roberto Dias	(Brazil) Campinense	(Portugal) Paços de Ferreira	Free
20 June 2013	(Portugal) Pedro Coronas	(Portugal) Penafiel	(Portugal) Vitória de Setúbal	Free
20 June 2013	(Brazil) Vinícius	(Portugal) Braga	(Portugal) Marítimo	Free
20 June 2013	(Guinea-Bissau) Ivanildo	(Portugal) Olhanense	(Portugal) Académica de Coimbra	Free
20 June 2013	(Brazil) Marcelo Goiano	(Brazil) Grêmio Anápolis	(Portugal) Académica de Coimbra	Loan
20 June 2013	(Portugal) Henrique	(England) Blackburn Rovers	(Portugal) Arouca	Loan
20 June 2013	(Portugal) Márcio Madeira	(Portugal) Nacional	(Portugal) Moreirense	Free
21 June 2013	(Portugal) Bruno Veríssimo	(Portugal) Olhanense	(Cyprus) APOEL	Free
21 June 2013	(Portugal) Rafa	(Portugal) Feirense	(Portugal) Braga	Undisclosed
21 June 2013	(Serbia) Aleksandar Miljković	(Serbia) Partizan	(Portugal) Braga	Free
21 June 2013	(Portugal) Romeu Ribeiro	(Portugal) Marítimo	(Portugal) Penafiel	Free
21 June 2013	(South Korea) Kang Min-Woo	(South Korea) Sangju Sangmu	(Portugal) Vitória de Setúbal	Free
21 June 2013	(Portugal) Fábio Vieira	(Portugal) Sporting de Espinho	(Portugal) Vitória de Guimarães	Free
21 June 2013	(Portugal) André Cunha	(Portugal) Gil Vicente	(Portugal) Ribeirão	Free
21 June 2013	(Equatorial Guinea) Javier Balboa	(Portugal) Beira-Mar	(Portugal) Estoril	Free
22 June 2013	(Somalia) Liban Abdi	(Portugal) Olhanense	(Germany) Eintracht Braunschweig	Free
24 June 2013	(Senegal) Ladji Keita	(Portugal) Nacional	(Angola) Petro de Luanda	Free
24 June 2013	(Brazil) Renato Neto	(Portugal) Sporting CP	(Belgium) Gent	Loan
24 June 2013	(Portugal) Miguel Vítor	(Portugal) Benfica	(Greece) PAOK	Free
24 June 2013	(Brazil) Bruno Lopes	(Japan) Albirex Niigata	(Portugal) Estoril	Loan
24 June 2013	(Portugal) Ricardo Pateiro	(Portugal) Rio Ave	(Portugal) Académico de Viseu	Free
24 June 2013	(Portugal) Clemente	(Portugal) Arouca	(Portugal) Chaves	Free
24 June 2013	(Portugal) Eurípedes Amoreirinha	(Portugal) Vitória de Setúbal	(India) Churchill Brothers	Free
25 June 2013	(Argentina) Matías Degra	(Cyprus) AEL Limassol	(Portugal) Paços de Ferreira	Free
25 June 2013	(Portugal) Gabi	(Portugal) Arouca	(Portugal) Penafiel	Free
25 June 2013	(Brazil) Danielson	(Cyprus) Omonia	(Portugal) Gil Vicente	Free
25 June 2013	(Portugal) Nélson Agra	(Portugal) Varzim	(Portugal) Gil Vicente	Free
25 June 2013	(Guinea-Bissau) Cícero	(Portugal) Paços de Ferreira	(Kazakhstan) Astana	Loan
26 June 2013	(Portugal) Dani Soares	(Greece) Skoda Xanthi	(Portugal) Vitória de Setúbal	Free
26 June 2013	(Portugal) David Simão	(Portugal) Benfica	(Portugal) Arouca	Free
26 June 2013	(Brazil) Sidney	(Brazil) Angra dos Reis	(Portugal) Marítimo	Free
26 June 2013	(Brazil) Thiago Carioca	(Brazil) Angra dos Reis	(Portugal) Marítimo	Free
27 June 2013	(Brazil) Luís Gustavo	(Brazil) Noroeste	(Portugal) Estoril	Free
27 June 2013	(Brazil) Diego Gonçalves	(Brazil) Fluminense	(Portugal) Olhanense	Free
27 June 2013	(Portugal) Rafinha	(Portugal) Paços de Ferreira	(Portugal) Trofense	Free
27 June 2013	(Serbia) Igor Stefanović	(Portugal) Porto	(Portugal) Arouca	Loan
27 June 2013	(Brazil) Mossoró	(Portugal) Braga	(Saudi Arabia) Al-Ahli Jeddah	€3,500,000
27 June 2013	(Switzerland) Gelson Fernandes	(Portugal) Sporting CP	(Germany) SC Freiburg	€500,000
28 June 2013	(Spain) Nolito	(Portugal) Benfica	(Spain) Celta Vigo	€2,600,000
28 June 2013	(Portugal) Hélder Lopes	(Portugal) Beira-Mar	(Portugal) Paços de Ferreira	Free
28 June 2013	(Portugal) João Paulo	(Portugal) Estoril	(Portugal) Desportivo das Aves	Free
28 June 2013	(Iceland) Helgi Daníelsson	(Sweden) AIK	(Portugal) Belenenses	Free
28 June 2013	(Portugal) Ricardo	(Portugal) Arouca	(Portugal) Salgueiros	Free
28 June 2013	(Cape Verde) Jimmy	(Portugal) Académica de Coimbra	(Portugal) União da Madeira	Loan
28 June 2013	(Portugal) Pedro Correia	(Italy) Crotone	(Portugal) Vitória de Guimarães	Free
28 June 2013	(Cameroon) Obama	(Portugal) Vizela	(Portugal) Vitória de Guimarães	Free
28 June 2013	(Portugal) Fábio Vieira	(Portugal) Sporting de Espinho	(Portugal) Vitória de Guimarães	Free
28 June 2013	(Portugal) João Ribeiro	(Portugal) Vitória de Guimarães	(Portugal) Olhanense	Free
28 June 2013	(Portugal) Soares	(Portugal) Rio Ave	(Portugal) Arouca	Loan
29 June 2013	(Denmark) Seejou King	(Denmark) Nordsjælland	(Portugal) Sporting CP	Free
29 June 2013	(Portugal) Luís Sousa	(Portugal) Paços de Ferreira	(Portugal) Desportivo das Aves	Loan
29 June 2013	(Portugal) Tiago Terroso	(Portugal) Olhanense	(Portugal) Vitória de Setúbal	Free
29 June 2013	(Colombia) Pajoy Ortiz	(Colombia) Atlético Nacional	(Portugal) Paços de Ferreira	Free
29 June 2013	(Portugal) Eurípedes Amoreirinha	(Portugal) Vitória	(India) Churchill Brothers	Free
30 June 2013	(Brazil) Jeferson	(Brazil) Grêmio Osasco	(Portugal) Braga	Free
30 June 2013	(Brazil) João Pedro	(Brazil) Santos	(Portugal) Estoril	Free
1 July 2013	(Brazil) Bruno Moura	(Brazil) Angra dos Reis	(Portugal) Nacional	Loan
1 July 2013	(Brazil) Alan Kardec	(Portugal) Benfica	(Brazil) Palmeiras	Loan
1 July 2013	(Brazil) Farley Rosa	(Portugal) Sporting CP	(Ukraine) Sevastopol	Free
1 July 2013	(Brazil) Califa	(Portugal) Mirandela	(Portugal) Gil Vicente	Free
2 July 2013	(Brazil) Luis Carlos	(Portugal) Gil Vicente	(Poland) Zawisza Bydgoszcz	Free
2 July 2013	(Brazil) Halisson	(Brazil) Noroeste	(Portugal) Gil Vicente	Loan
2 July 2013	(Portugal) Luís Cortez	(Portugal) Sporting CP	(Portugal) Belenenses	Free
2 July 2013	(Brazil) Gladestony	(Brazil) São Paulo	(Portugal) Estoril	Free
2 July 2013	(Brazil) Fabinho	(Portugal) Rio Ave	(France) AS Monaco	Loan
2 July 2013	(Brazil) Felipe Menezes	(Portugal) Benfica	(Brazil) Palmeiras	Undisclosed
2 July 2013	(France) Romain Salin	(Portugal) Marítimo	(Portugal) Rio Ave	Free
2 July 2013	(Ivory Coast) Bassalia Ouattara	(Portugal) Académica de Coimbra	(Portugal) Académico de Viseu	Loan
2 July 2013	(Ivory Coast) Issouf	(Portugal) Académica de Coimbra	(Portugal) Académico de Viseu	Loan
2 July 2013	(Brazil) Romário	(Brazil) Vasco da Gama	(Portugal) Arouca	Loan
3 July 2013	(Portugal) Edgar Costa	(Portugal) Nacional	(Portugal) Moreirense	Loan
3 July 2013	(Portugal) Esmaël Gonçalves	(Portugal) Rio Ave	(Cyprus) APOEL	Loan
3 July 2013	(Portugal) Moreno	(Portugal) Nacional	(Portugal) Vitória de Guimarães	Free
3 July 2013	(Portugal) Bruno Sabino	(Brazil) Lajeadense	(Portugal) Vitória de Setúbal	Loan
3 July 2013	(Portugal) Dani	(Portugal) Arouca	(Portugal) Penafiel	Free
3 July 2013	(Portugal) Alex	(Portugal) Santa Clara	(Portugal) Vitória de Guimarães	Free
3 July 2013	(Brazil) Maurício	(Brazil) Recife	(Portugal) Sporting CP	Free
4 July 2013	(Portugal) Tiaguinho	(Portugal) Braga	(Portugal) Lusitânia Lourosa	Loan
4 July 2013	(Portugal) Mário Palmeira	(Portugal) Braga	(Portugal) Tondela	Free
4 July 2013	(Portugal) Bruno Amaro	(Portugal) Vitória de Setúbal	(Portugal) Arouca	Free
4 July 2013	(Brazil) Diego Lopes	(Portugal) Benfica	(Portugal) Rio Ave	Loan
4 July 2013	(Portugal) Rui Miguel	(Cyprus) AEL Limassol	(Portugal) Paços de Ferreira	Free
4 July 2013	(Portugal) Edgar Costa	(Portugal) Nacional	(Portugal) Moreirense	Loan
4 July 2013	(Cape Verde) Nivaldo	(Portugal) Académica de Coimbra	(Czech Republic) Teplice	Free
4 July 2013	(Portugal) Fernando Alexandre	(Portugal) Olhanense	(Portugal) Académica de Coimbra	Free
4 July 2013	(Brazil) Manoel	(Brazil) Grêmio Anápolis	(Portugal) Académica de Coimbra	Loan
4 July 2013	(Argentina) Lisandro López	(Argentina) Arsenal de Sarandí	(Portugal) Benfica	Undisclosed
4 July 2013	(Portugal) Miguel Cardoso	(Portugal) Real	(Portugal) Rio Ave	Free
4 July 2013	(Portugal) Vítor Gomes	(Portugal) Rio Ave	(Hungary) Videoton	Free
5 July 2013	(Guinea) Salim Cissé	(Portugal) Académica de Coimbra	(Portugal) Sporting CP	€200,000
5 July 2013	(Portugal) Hugo Sousa	(Cyprus) AEP Paphos	(Portugal) Sporting CP	Free
5 July 2013	(Brazil) Paulo Henrique	(Brazil) Santos	(Portugal) Rio Ave	Free
5 July 2013	(Portugal) Nuno Coelho	(Portugal) Benfica	(Portugal) Arouca	Free
5 July 2013	(Portugal) Serginho	(Portugal) Beira-Mar	(Portugal) Arouca	Free
5 July 2013	(Portugal) Eduardo	(Italy) Genoa	(Portugal) Braga	Loan
5 July 2013	(South Korea) Dong-Wook Seo	(South Korea) Bucheon	(Portugal) Paços de Ferreira	Free
7 July 2013	(Paraguay) Javier Cohene	(Portugal) Paços de Ferreira	(Portugal) Vitória de Setúbal	Free
7 July 2013	(Brazil) Erick	(Portugal) Estoril	(United States) Dallas	Free
7 July 2013	(Portugal) Miguel Lopes	(Portugal) Sporting CP	(France) Lyon	Loan
7 July 2013	(Argentina) José Shaffer	(Portugal) Benfica	(Argentina) Talleres de Córdoba	Free
8 July 2013	(Portugal) Sílvio	(Spain) Atlético Madrid	(Portugal) Benfica	Loan
8 July 2013	(Algeria) Nabil Ghilas	(Portugal) Moreirense	(Portugal) Porto	Undisclosed
8 July 2013	(Brazil) Cláudio	(Portugal) Gil Vicente	(Portugal) Académico de Viseu	Free
9 July 2013	(Brazil) Adilson	(Brazil) Friburguense	(Portugal) Vitória de Setúbal	Free
9 July 2013	(France) Lionel Carole	(Portugal) Benfica	(France) Troyes	Free
9 July 2013	(Portugal) Emídio Rafael	(Portugal) Braga	(Greece) Platanias	Free
9 July 2013	(Portugal) Vasco Fernandes	(Portugal) Olhanense	(Greece) Platanias	Free
9 July 2013	(Cape Verde) Zé Luís	(Portugal) Braga	(Hungary) Videoton	Loan
9 July 2013	(Portugal) Serginho	(Portugal) Arouca	(Portugal) Santa Clara	Free
10 July 2013	(Brazil) Yuri Machado	(Brazil) Santacruzense	(Portugal) Olhanense	Free
10 July 2013	(Portugal) Vítor Bastos	(Portugal) Vitória de Guimarães	(Portugal) Olhanense	Free
10 July 2013	(Portugal) Pedro Celestino	(Romania) Cluj	(Portugal) Olhanense	Free
10 July 2013	(Portugal) Manuel Pedro	(Portugal) Vitória de Guimarães	(Portugal) Lixa	Free
10 July 2013	(Brazil) Yuri Machado	(Brazil) Santacruzense	(Portugal) Olhanense	Free
10 July 2013	(Mozambique) Zainadine Júnior	(Mozambique) Santacruzense	(Portugal) Nacional	Free
10 July 2013	(Senegal) Oumar Pouye	(France) Amiens	(Portugal) Olhanense	Free
10 July 2013	(France) Jean-Christophe Coubronne	(Italy) Novara	(Portugal) Olhanense	Free
10 July 2013	(Brazil) Vinicius	(Portugal) Braga	(Cyprus) APOEL	Free
11 July 2013	(Portugal) Rúben Ribeiro	(Portugal) Beira-Mar	(Portugal) Paços de Ferreira	Free
11 July 2013	(Brazil) Bruno Cortês	(Brazil) São Paulo	(Portugal) Benfica	Loan
11 July 2013	(South Korea) Suk Hyun-Jun	(Portugal) Marítimo	(Saudi Arabia) Al-Ahli	€3,000,000
11 July 2013	(Portugal) Luis Gustavo	(Spain) Barcelona	(Portugal) Rio Ave	Free
11 July 2013	(Brazil) Djavan	(Brazil) Corinthians Alagoano	(Portugal) Académica de Coimbra	Loan
11 July 2013	(Colombia) Juan Quintero	(Colombia) Atlético Nacional	(Portugal) Porto	€5,000,000
11 July 2013	(Peru) Gino Guerrero	(Peru) Alianza Lima	(Portugal) Paços de Ferreira	Undisclosed
11 July 2013	(Portugal) Ângelo Meneses	(Portugal) Famalicão	(Portugal) Rio Ave	Free
11 July 2013	(Brazil) Lionn	(Romania) Cluj	(Portugal) Rio Ave	Free
12 July 2013	(Spain) Juan Carlos	(Portugal) Braga	(Spain) Real Betis	Loan
12 July 2013	(Slovenia) Vid Belec	(Italy) Inter Milan	(Portugal) Olhanense	Loan
12 July 2013	(Brazil) Daniel Bessa	(Italy) Inter Milan	(Portugal) Olhanense	Loan
12 July 2013	(Brazil) Sebá	(Brazil) Cruzeiro	(Portugal) Estoril	€337,000
12 July 2013	(Portugal) Luís Pedro	(Portugal) Freamunde	(Portugal) Nacional	Free
12 July 2013	(Portugal) Pelé	(Italy) AC Milan	(Portugal) Olhanense	Loan
12 July 2013	(Portugal) Ricardo Ferreira	(Italy) AC Milan	(Portugal) Olhanense	Free
12 July 2013	(Portugal) Káká	(Portugal) Vitória de Guimarães	(Portugal) Belenenses	Free
13 July 2013	(Mali) Alphousseyni Keita	(Portugal) Académica de Coimbra	(Portugal) Gil Vicente	Free
13 July 2013	(Senegal) Adama François	(China) Beijing Guoan	(Portugal) Vitória de Setúbal	Free
13 July 2013	(Netherlands) Stijn Schaars	(Portugal) Sporting CP	(Netherlands) PSV Eindhoven	Undisclosed
13 July 2013	(Colombia) Santiago Arias	(Portugal) Sporting CP	(Netherlands) PSV Eindhoven	Undisclosed
14 July 2013	(Croatia) Tibor Čiča	(Croatia) NK Zagreb	(Portugal) Olhanense	Loan
15 July 2013	(Portugal) Carlos Manuel	(Portugal) Vitória de Guimarães	(Portugal) Felgueiras 1932	Free
15 July 2013	(Portugal) Aníbal Capela	(Portugal) Braga	(Portugal) Académica de Coimbra	Loan
15 July 2013	(Brazil) Sandro Lima	(Brazil) Grêmio Anápolis	(Portugal) Rio Ave	Free
16 July 2013	(Portugal) Paulo Jorge	(Portugal) Gil Vicente	(Portugal) Belenenses	Free
16 July 2013	(Niger) Moussa Maâzou	(Tunisia) Étoile du Sahel	(Portugal) Vitória de Guimarães	Free
16 July 2013	(Argentina) Agustín Vuletich	(Argentina) Vélez Sarsfield	(Portugal) Vitória de Guimarães	Loan
16 July 2013	(Iceland) Eggert Jónsson	(England) Wolverhampton Wanderers	(Portugal) Belenenses	Free
16 July 2013	(Venezuela) Eloy	(Portugal) Rio Ave	(Portugal) Desportivo de Ronfe	Free
17 July 2013	(Brazil) Luis Carlos	(Portugal) Gil Vicente	(Poland) Zawisza Bydgoszcz	Free
17 July 2013	(Portugal) Paulo Sérgio	(Cyprus) AEL Limassol	(Portugal) Arouca	Free
17 July 2013	(Portugal) Daniel Martins	(Portugal) Belenenses	(Italy) Palermo	Loan
17 July 2013	(Cape Verde) Djaniny	(Portugal) Benfica	(Portugal) Nacional	Free
17 July 2013	(Portugal) Leandro Pimenta	(Portugal) Benfica	(Portugal) Gil Vicente	Free
17 July 2013	(Brazil) Rodrigo Galo	(Portugal) Braga	(Greece) Panetolikos	Loan
17 July 2013	(Portugal) Diogo Tavares	(Portugal) Estoril	(Italy) Ancona	Free
18 July 2013	(Portugal) Diogo Figueiras	(Portugal) Paços de Ferreira	(Spain) Sevilla	Undisclosed
19 July 2013	(Paraguay) Ramón Cardozo	(Paraguay) Nacional	(Portugal) Vitória de Setúbal	Free
19 July 2013	(India) Sunil Chhetri	(Portugal) Sporting CP	(India) Bengaluru	Free
20 July 2013	(Portugal) Diogo Valente	(Romania) Cluj	(Portugal) Académica de Coimbra	Loan
21 July 2013	(Brazil) Weldinho	(Brazil) Palmeiras	(Portugal) Sporting CP	Loan
21 July 2013	(Colombia) Fredy Montero	(United States) Seattle Sounders FC	(Portugal) Sporting CP	Undisclosed
21 July 2013	(Nigeria) Femi	(Spain) Atlético Baleares	(Portugal) Olhanense	Free
21 July 2013	(Spain) Iván Balliu	(Spain) Barcelona B	(Portugal) Arouca	Free
21 July 2013	(Portugal) Ricardo Pateiro	(Portugal) Rio Ave	(Portugal) União de Leiria	Free
22 July 2013	(Portugal) Rafa	(Portugal) Vitória de Guimarães	(Portugal) Moreirense	Free
23 July 2013	(Portugal) Ukra	(Portugal) Porto	(Portugal) Rio Ave	Free
23 July 2013	(Portugal) Pizzi	(Spain) Atlético Madrid	(Portugal) Benfica	Undisclosed
24 July 2013	(Germany) Patrick Bauer	(Germany) VfB Stuttgart	(Portugal) Marítimo	Free
24 July 2013	(Argentina) Luis Fariña	(Argentina) Racing	(Portugal) Benfica	Undisclosed
24 July 2013	(Portugal) Nélson Oliveira	(Portugal) Benfica	(France) Rennes	Loan
24 July 2013	(Portugal) Quim	(Portugal) Braga	(Portugal) Desportivo das Aves	Free
25 July 2013	(Brazil) Diogo Bittencourt	(Portugal) Braga	(Portugal) Feirense	Free
25 July 2013	(Portugal) Filipe Oliveira	(Portugal) Benfica	(Portugal) Marítimo	Free
25 July 2013	(Italy) Mirko Bigazzi	(Italy) Livorno	(Portugal) Olhanense	Loan
26 July 2013	(Portugal) Ricardo Ribeiro	(Portugal) Moreirense	(Portugal) Estoril	Loan
26 July 2013	(Portugal) Cafú	(Portugal) Benfica	(Portugal) Vitória de Guimarães	Free
26 July 2013	(Portugal) Rui Coentrão	(Portugal) Varzim	(Portugal) Gil Vicente	Free
26 July 2013	(Portugal) Yohan Tavares	(Belgium) Standard Liège	(Portugal) Estoril	Free
26 July 2013	(Portugal) Nuno Lopes	(Portugal) Beira-Mar	(Portugal) Rio Ave	Free
26 July 2013	(Brazil) Edimar	(Romania) Cluj	(Portugal) Rio Ave	Free
26 July 2013	(Brazil) Ronny	(Romania) Cluj	(Portugal) Rio Ave	Loan
29 July 2013	(Brazil) Revson	(Portugal) Nacional	(Bulgaria) CSKA Sofia	Loan
29 July 2013	(Portugal) Pizzi	(Portugal) Benfica	(Spain) Espanyol	Loan
29 July 2013	(Brazil) Sidnei	(Portugal) Benfica	(Spain) Espanyol	Loan
29 July 2013	(Portugal) Rui Coentrão	(Portugal) Gil Vicente	(Portugal) Leixões	Free
29 July 2013	(Mali) Mahamadou N'Diaye	(Portugal) Vitória de Guimarães	(France) Troyes	Free
30 July 2013	(Turkey) Sinan Bolat	(Belgium) Standard Liège	(Portugal) Porto	Free
30 July 2013	(Romania) Sebastian Mladen	(Italy) Roma	(Portugal) Olhanense	Loan
30 July 2013	(Albania) Agon Mehmeti	(Italy) Palermo	(Portugal) Olhanense	Loan
30 July 2013	(Guinea-Bissau) Califo	(Portugal) Gil Vicente	(Portugal) Oliveirense	Loan
30 July 2013	(Angola) Valdinho	(Portugal) Gil Vicente	(Portugal) Oliveirense	Loan
31 July 2013	(Portugal) Paulo Arantes	(Portugal) Gil Vicente	(Portugal) Santa Clara	Free
31 July 2013	(Ghana) Haminu Draman	(France) Arles-Avignon	(Portugal) Gil Vicente	Free
1 August 2013	(Argentina) Valentín Viola	(Portugal) Sporting CP	(Argentina) Racing	Loan
1 August 2013	(Slovakia) Jakub Vojtuš	(Croatia) NK Zagreb	(Portugal) Olhanense	Free
2 August 2013	(Portugal) Miguel Rosa	(Portugal) Benfica	(Portugal) Belenenses	Free
3 August 2013	(Portugal) Roderick Miranda	(Portugal) Benfica	(Portugal) Rio Ave	Free
3 August 2013	(Portugal) Adilson	(Portugal) Belenenses	(Portugal) União da Madeira	Loan
4 August 2013	(Portugal) Ruca	(Portugal) Gil Vicente	(Portugal) Mirandela	Loan
4 August 2013	(Brazil) Douglão	(Portugal) Braga	Qatar SC	Loan
5 August 2013	(Brazil) Diego Lopes	(Portugal) Benfica	(Portugal) Rio Ave	Free
5 August 2013	(Senegal) Idrissa Mandiang	(Portugal) Arouca	(Portugal) Moreirense	Free
6 August 2013	(Brazil) Deyverson	(Portugal) Benfica	(Portugal) Belenenses	Free
6 August 2013	(Brazil) Rafael Bracalli	(Portugal) Porto	(Greece) Panetolikos	Free
6 August 2013	(Portugal) André Micael	(Portugal) Olhanense	(Poland) Zawisza Bydgoszcz	Free
7 August 2013	(Brazil) Michel	(Portugal) Benfica	(Qatar) Al-Wakrah	Loan
8 August 2013	(Argentina) Luis Fariña	(Portugal) Benfica	(United Arab Emirates) Baniyas	Loan
7 August 2013	(Uruguay) Rodrigo Mora	(Portugal) Benfica	(Argentina) River Plate	Free
8 August 2013	(Portugal) Rolando	(Portugal) Porto	(Italy) Inter Milan	Loan
8 August 2013	(Brazil) Carlão	(Portugal) Braga	(Portugal) Paços de Ferreira	Free
8 August 2013	(Brazil) Fernando Russi	(Brazil) Treze	(Portugal) Vitória de Guimarães	Free
9 August 2013	(Argentina) Rogelio Funes Mori	(Argentina) River Plate	(Portugal) Benfica	Free
9 August 2013	(Argentina) Franco Jara	(Portugal) Benfica	(Argentina) Estudiantes de La Plata	Loan
9 August 2013	(Portugal) Semedo	(Portugal) Marítimo	(Portugal) Portimonense	Loan
9 August 2013	(Portugal) Ricardo Ferreira	(Portugal) Marítimo	(Portugal) Portimonense	Loan
10 August 2013	(Portugal) Fábio Pala	(Portugal) Casa Pia	(Portugal) Vitória de Setúbal	Free
10 August 2013	(Portugal) Fábio Pala	(Portugal) Vitória de Setúbal	(Portugal) Casa Pia	Loan
10 August 2013	(Switzerland) Johnny Leoni	(Cyprus) Omonia	(Portugal) Marítimo	Free
12 August 2013	(Portugal) Rúben Oliveira	(Portugal) Rio Ave	(Portugal) Feirense	Free
14 August 2013	(Brazil) Luiz Phellype	(Portugal) Estoril	(Portugal) Beira-Mar	Loan
14 August 2013	(Portugal) Tó Barbosa	(Portugal) Gil Vicente	(Portugal) Varzim	Loan
16 August 2013	(China) Lei Tenglong	(China) Beijing Guoan	(Portugal) Marítimo	Loan
19 August 2013	(Portugal) Luisinho	(Portugal) Benfica	(Spain) Deportivo La Coruña	Free
19 August 2013	(Brazil) Dieguinho	(Portugal) Estoril	(Portugal) Beira-Mar	Loan
21 August 2013	(Brazil) Cássio	(Portugal) Braga	(Portugal) Arouca	Free
22 August 2013	(Togo) Francis Koné	(Thailand) PTT Rayong	(Portugal) Olhanense	Loan
23 August 2013	(Senegal) Oumar Diakhite	(United States) Orlando City	(Portugal) Olhanense	Free
24 August 2013	(Portugal) Hugo Vieira	(Portugal) Benfica	(Portugal) Braga	Free
24 August 2013	(Serbia) Ljubomir Fejsa	(Greece) Olympiacos	(Portugal) Benfica	Undisclosed
25 August 2013	(Portugal) Carlos Fortes	(Portugal) Nacional	(Spain) Racing de Santander	Free
28 August 2013	(Portugal) Hélder Barbosa	(Portugal) Braga	(Spain) Almería	Loan
29 August 2013	(Portugal) Henrique Sereno	(Portugal) Porto	(Turkey) Kayserispor	€1,000,000
29 August 2013	(Portugal) João Pedro	(Portugal) Braga	(Portugal) Belenenses	Loan
29 August 2013	(Portugal) Ricardo Alves	(Portugal) Belenenses	(Portugal) Portimonense	Loan
29 August 2013	(Croatia) Danijel Pranjić	(Portugal) Sporting CP	(Greece) Panathinaikos	Free
29 August 2013	(Brazil) Cláudio Pitbull	(Brazil) Bahia	(Portugal) Gil Vicente	Free
29 August 2013	(France) Atila Turan	(Portugal) Sporting CP	(France) Stade de Reims	Free
29 August 2013	(Portugal) André Santos	(Portugal) Sporting CP	(Portugal) Vitória de Guimarães	Free
30 August 2013	(Ivory Coast) Siaka Bamba	(Portugal) Vitória de Guimarães	(Portugal) Chaves	Free
30 August 2013	(Portugal) Rabiola	(Portugal) Braga	(Poland) Piast Gliwice	Loan
31 August 2013	(Paraguay) Lorenzo Melgarejo	(Portugal) Benfica	(Russia) Kuban Krasnodar	Undisclosed
1 September 2013	(Ivory Coast) Jean Seri	(Portugal) Porto	(Portugal) Paços de Ferreira	Free
1 September 2013	(Portugal) Tiago Ilori	(Portugal) Sporting CP	(England) Liverpool	€7,500,000
1 September 2013	(Cape Verde) Rambé	(Portugal) Belenenses	(Portugal) Farense	Loan
1 September 2013	(Burkina Faso) Nii Plange	(Portugal) Sporting CP	(Portugal) Vitória de Guimarães	Free
1 September 2013	(Ghana) Christian Atsu	(Portugal) Porto	(England) Chelsea	€4,000,000
1 September 2013	(Argentina) Lisandro López	(Portugal) Benfica	(Spain) Getafe	Loan
2 September 2013	(Brazil) Nikolas Mariano	(Brazil) Corinthians	(Portugal) Belenenses	Loan
2 September 2013	(Guinea-Bissau) Zézinho	(Portugal) Sporting CP	(Greece) Veria	Loan
2 September 2013	(Portugal) André Teixeira	(Portugal) Belenenses	(Portugal) Leixões	Loan
2 September 2013	(Portugal) Jaime Poulson	(Portugal) Paços de Ferreira	(Portugal) Desportivo das Aves	Loan
2 September 2013	(Argentina) Juan Iturbe	(Portugal) Porto	(Italy) Hellas Verona	Loan
2 September 2013	(Georgia (country)) Avtandil Ebralidze	(Portugal) Oliveirense	(Portugal) Gil Vicente	Free
2 September 2013	(Senegal) Kalidou Yéro	(Portugal) Gil Vicente	(Portugal) Oliveirense	Loan
2 September 2013	(Cape Verde) Ely	(Portugal) Gil Vicente	(Portugal) Oliveirense	Loan
2 September 2013	(Ivory Coast) Alphonse	(Portugal) Gil Vicente	(Portugal) Oliveirense	Loan
2 September 2013	(Brazil) Thales	(Brazil) Paulista	(Portugal) Braga	Loan
2 September 2013	(Portugal) Bébé	(England) Manchester United	(Portugal) Paços de Ferreira	Loan
2 September 2013	(Chile) Diego Rubio	(Portugal) Sporting CP	(Romania) Pandurii Târgu Jiu	Loan
2 September 2013	(Brazil) Rafael Porcellis	(Portugal) Braga	(Portugal) Feirense	Loan
2 September 2013	(Spain) Cristian Ceballos	(England) Tottenham Hotspur	(Portugal) Arouca	Loan
2 September 2013	(Brazil) Guilherme Siqueira	(Spain) Granada	(Portugal) Benfica	Loan
2 September 2013	(Montenegro) Nikola Vukčević	(Montenegro) Budućnost Podgorica	(Portugal) Braga	Free
2 September 2013	(France) Florent Hanin	(Portugal) Braga	(Portugal) Moreirense	Loan
2 September 2013	(Republic of the Congo) Chris Malonga	(France) AS Monaco	(Portugal) Vitória de Guimarães	Free
2 September 2013	(Portugal) Bruma	(Portugal) Sporting CP	(Turkey) Galatasaray	€10,000,000
2 September 2013	(Portugal) Vítor	(Portugal) Paços de Ferreira	(Portugal) Sporting CP	Undisclosed
2 September 2013	(Paraguay) Iván Piris	(Uruguay) Deportivo Maldonado	(Portugal) Sporting CP	Undisclosed
2 September 2013	(Senegal) Abdoulaye Ba	(Portugal) Porto	(Portugal) Vitória de Guimarães	Loan
2 September 2013	(Portugal) Tiago Rodrigues	(Portugal) Porto	(Portugal) Vitória de Guimarães	Loan
2 September 2013	(France) Frédéric Mendy	(Portugal) Estoril	(Portugal) Moreirense	Loan
2 September 2013	(Portugal) José Marafona	(Portugal) Marítimo	(Portugal) Moreirense	Free
2 September 2013	(Italy) Federico Dionisi	(Italy) Livorno	(Portugal) Olhanense	Loan
2 September 2013	(Brazil) Murilo Otávio Mendes	(Italy) Livorno	(Portugal) Olhanense	Free

- ^1 A player who signed with a club before the opening of the summer transfer window, will officially join his new club on 1 July. While a player who joined a club after 1 July will join his new club following his signature of the contract.
