= Hugo Gomes =

Hugo Gomes may refer to:

- Hugo Gomes (footballer, born 1979), Portuguese football right-back
- Hugo Gomes (footballer, born 1995), Brazilian football centre-back

== See also ==
- Hugo Gómez (born 1948), Colombian actor
