= Tiago Cintra =

Portuguese footballer

Personal information
- Full name: Tiago Manuel Pinto Cintra
- Date of birth: 5 July 1989 (age 37)
- Place of birth: Matosinhos, Portugal
- Height: 1.85 m (6 ft 1 in)
- Position: Forward

Youth career
- 1997–2000: Futsal
- 2000–2006: Leixões
- 2006–2008: Porto
- 2006–2007: → Leixões (loan)

Senior career*
Years	Team	Apps	(Gls)
2008–2012	Leixões	37	(3)
2008–2009	→ Amarante (loan)	29	(10)
2012–2014	Beira-Mar	31	(4)
2013	→ Aves (loan)	13	(1)
2014–2015	Freamunde	14	(1)
2015–2016	Varzim B	19	(7)
2016–2017	Pinhalnovense	14	(2)
2017–2018	Leixões B	8	(2)
2018–2019	Pedras Rubras	21	(1)
2019–2020	Maia Lidador	6	(0)
2021–2022	Grijó		

International career
2006	Portugal U17	7	(4)
2006–2007	Portugal U18	9	(2)
2009	Portugal U21	1	(0)
- * Club domestic league appearances and goals as of 11:52, 26 October 2022 (UTC)

Tiago Manuel Pinto Cintra (born 5 July 1989) is a Portuguese footballer who plays as a forward.

== Club career ==
Born in Matosinhos, Porto metropolitan area, Cintra played futsal before spending most of his youth career with hometown club Leixões SC, while also having a spell FC Porto. Loaned to Amarante F.C. of the third division in the 2008–09 season, he made his senior debut.

Cintra played 17 times and scored once in the Primeira Liga in the 2009–10 campaign, as Leixões were relegated. A year later, he moved to S.C. Beira-Mar also in the top flight, where he was a fringe player for his first two seasons and was loaned to Segunda Liga side C.D. Aves in January 2013.

In July 2014, Cintra signed a one-year deal with second-division S.C. Freamunde. Both he and fellow unemployed player Tiago Terroso were taken on by Varzim S.C. in November 2015, to play in the reserve team in the third tier. He later represented in that league C.D. Pinhalnovense and F.C. Pedras Rubras, as well as Leixões' reserves in amateur football.

== International career ==
Cintra won one cap for Portugal at under-21 level, coming on as a 60th-minute substitute in the 1–0 away loss against England for the 2011 UEFA European Championship qualifiers on 13 November 2009.
