= Rafael Martins (footballer, born 1989) =

Brazilian footballer

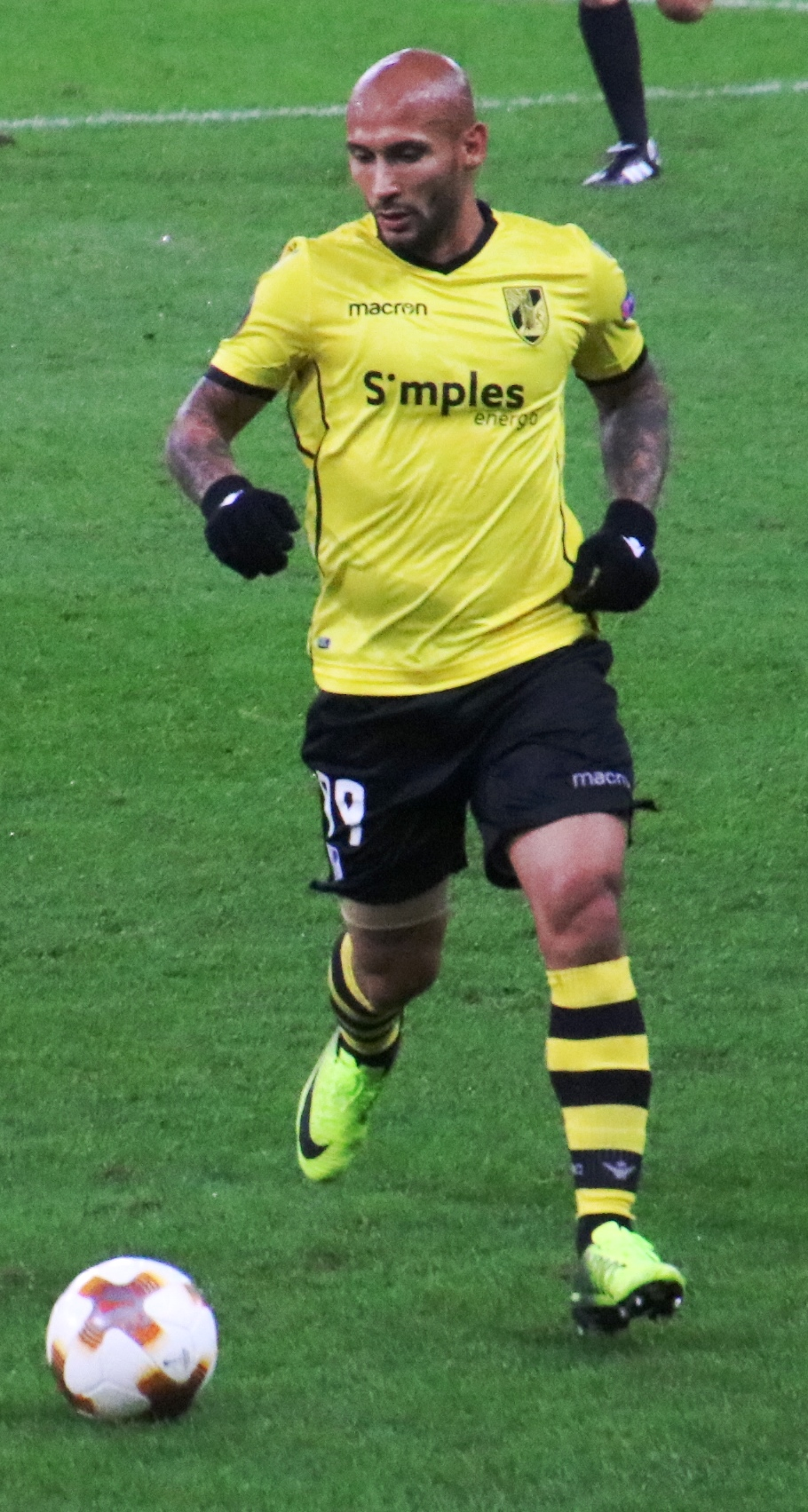

Personal information
- Full name: Clecildo Rafael Martins de Souza Ladislau
- Date of birth: 17 March 1989 (age 37)
- Place of birth: Santos, Brazil
- Height: 1.77 m (5 ft 10 in)
- Position: Striker

Team information
- Current team: Fafe
- Number: 7

Youth career
- 2003–2009: Audax
- 2005: → Juventus-SP (loan)
- 2006: → Internacional (loan)
- 2007–2009: → Grêmio (loan)

Senior career*
Years	Team	Apps	(Gls)
2009–2014	Audax	59	(36)
2009	→ Grêmio (loan)	2	(0)
2009–2010	→ Zaragoza B (loan)	28	(15)
2010	→ Grêmio Barueri (loan)	12	(1)
2011	→ ABC (loan)	4	(0)
2013	→ Chapecoense (loan)	19	(11)
2013–2014	→ Vitória Setúbal (loan)	28	(16)
2014–2017	Levante	22	(2)
2015–2016	→ Moreirense (loan)	27	(16)
2017–2018	Vitória Guimarães	36	(8)
2018–2020	Zhejiang Greentown	39	(20)
2021–2022	Moreirense	53	(14)
2022–2023	Casa Pia	28	(6)
2023–2024	Santa Clara	29	(4)
2024–2025	Leixões	29	(6)
2026–	Fafe	3	(0)
- * Club domestic league appearances and goals as of 22:04, 3 September 2026 (UTC)

Clecildo Rafael Martins de Souza Ladislau (born 17 March 1989), known as Martins, is a Brazilian professional footballer who plays as a striker for Liga 3 club Fafe.

== Club career ==
Born in Santos, São Paulo, Martins joined Audax São Paulo Esporte Clube's youth setup in 2003, aged 14. In December 2007, he signed with Grêmio Foot-Ball Porto Alegrense on loan, and was promoted to the latter's main squad in 2009.

Martins made his professional debut on 21 January 2009, coming on as a second-half substitute in a 1–1 draw at Esporte Clube Internacional. He returned to his parent club in September, and subsequently served loans at Deportivo Aragón and Grêmio Prudente Futebol before being assigned to Audax's first team.

Martins joined ABC Futebol Clube in March 2011 after impressing in the state leagues, but was rarely used by his new team, returning to Audax in December. He continued to find the net at an excellent rate in the following two years, and moved to Vitória F.C. on loan on 8 July 2013.

After ranking third in the goal charts for the Portuguese side to help them finish in seventh position in the Primeira Liga in his only season, Martins signed a three-year contract with La Liga's Levante UD on 18 July 2014. He made his debut in the competition on 24 August, replacing David Barral in the 71st minute of a 0–2 home loss against Villarreal CF.

On 25 August 2015, after being sparingly used by the Valencians, Martins returned to Portugal and its top division after agreeing to a one-year loan deal with Moreirense FC. He scored 16 goals in his only season, being essential as the Miguel Leal-led side finished 12th and avoided relegation while becoming the club's all-time scorer in the competition after surpassing Nabil Ghilas.

From January 2017 to June 2018, Martins represented Vitória S.C. also in the Portuguese top tier. On 3 July 2018, he moved to the China League One with Zhejiang Greentown FC.

Martins returned to Portugal in January 2021, joining Moreirense on a five-month contract. Having netted seven times until the end of the top-flight campaign, he was rewarded with a one-year extension.

On 27 July 2022, after suffering relegation to the Liga Portugal 2, Martins signed a two-year deal with Casa Pia A.C. who had in turn promoted. He made his debut on 7 August in a 0–0 draw away to C.D. Santa Clara, and scored his first goal two weeks later to open a 2–0 home win over Boavista FC.

Martins went back to the second tier on 30 August 2023, on a two-year contract at recently-relegated Santa Clara. He scored four goals for the league champions, five in all competitions.

For 2024–25, the 35-year-old Martins joined Leixões S.C. of the second division. Two weeks into the following season, he terminated his contract by mutual consent.

== Career statistics ==
As of match played 12 May 2024

Appearances and goals by club, season and competition
Club	Season	League			State league		National cup		League cup		Continental		Other		Total	
Club	Season	Division	Apps	Goals	Apps	Goals	Apps	Goals	Apps	Goals	Apps	Goals	Apps	Goals	Apps	Goals
Grêmio (loan)	2009	Série A	—		2 (Note: Appearances in Campeonato Gaúcho)	0	—		—		—		—		2	0
Grêmio Barueri (loan)	2010	Série A	12	1	—		—		—		2 (Note: Appearances in Copa Sudamericana)	0	—		14	1
Audax	2011	—	—		12 (Note: Appearances in Campeonato Paulista Série A2)	9	—		—		—		—		12	9
Audax	2012	—	—		23	17	—		—		—		—		23	17
Audax	2013	—	—		24	10	—		—		—		—		24	10
Audax	Total		—		59	36	—		—		—		—		59	36
ABC (loan)	2011	Série B	4	0	—		0	0	—		—		—		4	0
Vitória Setúbal (loan)	2013–14	Primeira Liga	28	16	—		2	0	3	0	—		—		33	16
Levante	2014–15	La Liga	13	1	—		4	0	—		—		—		17	1
Levante	2016–17	Segunda División	9	1	—		1	0	—		—		—		10	1
Levante	Total		22	2	—		5	0	—		—		—		27	2
Moreirense (loan)	2015–16	Primeira Liga	27	16	—		0	0	3	3	—		—		30	19
Vitória Guimarães	2016–17	Primeira Liga	9	2	—		1	0	0	0	—		—		10	2
Vitória Guimarães	2017–18	Primeira Liga	27	6	—		1	0	3	0	4 (Note: Appearances in UEFA Europa League)	1	1 (Note: Appearance in Supertaça Cândido de Oliveira)	0	36	7
Vitória Guimarães	Total		36	8	—		2	0	3	0	4	1	1	0	46	9
Zhejiang Greentown	2018	China League One	15	10	—		0	0	—		—		—		15	10
Zhejiang Greentown	2019	China League One	12	4	—		1	2	—		—		—		13	6
Zhejiang Greentown	2020	China League One	12	6	—		0	0	—		—		1 (Note: Appearance in China League One promotion play-offs)	0	13	6
Zhejiang Greentown	Total		39	20	—		1	2	—		—		1	0	41	22
Moreirense	2020–21	Primeira Liga	19	7	—		1	0	—		—		—		20	7
Moreirense	2021–22	Primeira Liga	34	7	—		2	1	1	0	—		2 (Note: Appearances in Primeira Liga relegation play-offs)	0	39	8
Moreirense	Total		53	14	—		3	1	1	0	—		2	0	59	15
Casa Pia	2022–23	Primeira Liga	26	6	—		4	3	2	0	—		—		32	9
Casa Pia	2023–24	Primeira Liga	2	0	—		0	0	2	0	—		—		4	0
Casa Pia	Total		28	6	—		4	3	4	0	—		—		36	9
Santa Clara	2023–24	Liga Portugal 2	29	4	—		3	1	0	0	—		0	0	32	5
Career total			278	87	64	37	17	6	14	3	6	1	4	0	383	134

== Honours ==
Santa Clara

- Liga Portugal 2: 2023–24
