= João Mário (footballer, born January 1993) =

Portuguese footballer

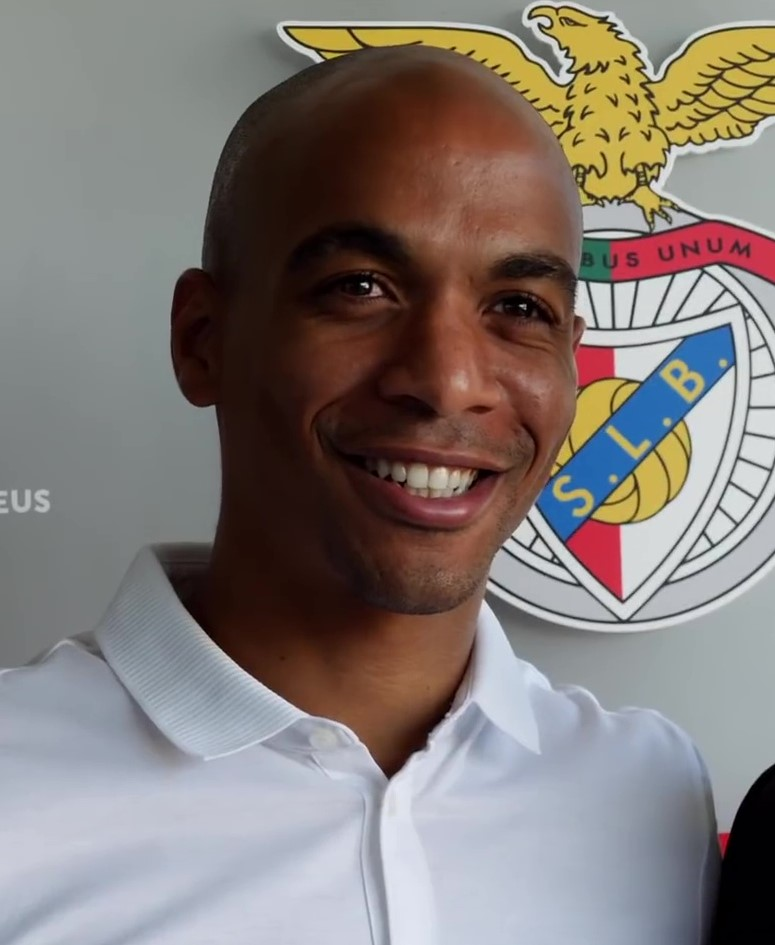
- João Mário with Benfica in 2021

Personal information
- Full name: João Mário Naval da Costa Eduardo
- Date of birth: 19 January 1993 (age 33)
- Place of birth: Porto, Portugal
- Height: 1.79 m (5 ft 10 in)
- Position: Midfielder

Team information
- Current team: AEK Athens
- Number: 23

Youth career
- 2002–2004: Porto
- 2004–2012: Sporting CP

Senior career*
Years	Team	Apps	(Gls)
2011–2016	Sporting CP	65	(11)
2012–2013	Sporting CP B	44	(2)
2014	→ Vitória Setúbal (loan)	15	(0)
2016–2021	Inter Milan	64	(4)
2018	→ West Ham United (loan)	13	(2)
2019–2020	→ Lokomotiv Moscow (loan)	18	(1)
2020–2021	→ Sporting CP (loan)	28	(2)
2021–2025	Benfica	94	(23)
2024–2025	→ Beşiktaş (loan)	27	(5)
2025–2026	Beşiktaş	2	(0)
2025–2026	→ AEK Athens (loan)	26	(2)
2026–	AEK Athens	2	(0)

International career
2007–2008	Portugal U15	3	(0)
2008–2009	Portugal U16	9	(3)
2009–2010	Portugal U17	17	(4)
2010–2011	Portugal U18	9	(1)
2010–2012	Portugal U19	17	(2)
2012–2013	Portugal U20	14	(1)
2013–2015	Portugal U21	13	(3)
2014–2023	Portugal	56	(3)
Medal record
Men's football
Representing Portugal
UEFA European Championship
Winner	2016 France
- * Club domestic league appearances and goals as of 15:10, 29 October 2026 (UTC)

João Mário Naval da Costa Eduardo ComM (born 19 January 1993), known as João Mário (Portuguese pronunciation: [ʒuˈɐ̃w ˈmaɾju, ˈʒwɐ̃w -]), is a Portuguese professional footballer who plays as a midfielder for Super League Greece club AEK Athens.

He started out at Sporting CP in whose youth system he developed, being loaned to Vitória de Setúbal in 2014 and subsequently returning to be an important part of the squads that won major trophies, including the 2015 Taça de Portugal. In 2016 he joined Inter Milan, having loan spells at West Ham United and Lokomotiv Moscow prior to rejoining Sporting, also on loan, in 2020, where he won the Primeira Liga title. He then spent three full seasons with Benfica, winning another league in 2022–23 while scoring 17 goals.

João Mário made his senior debut for Portugal in 2014. He was named in the squads for Euro 2016 and the 2018 and 2022 World Cups, winning the 2016 tournament.

== Club career ==
=== Sporting CP ===
Following a brief youth spell with local Porto in his hometown, where he was deployed as a central defender, João Mário moved to Sporting CP in 2004 at the age of 11, going on to complete his development with the Lisbon club. On 14 December 2011 he was called for a UEFA Europa League group stage game away against Lazio, alongside youth graduates Betinho, Ricardo Esgaio, Tiago Ilori and João Carlos, as the Lions had already secured the first place in its group: he entered the pitch in the 76th minute of the 2–0 away loss, after replacing Oguchi Onyewu.

João Mário's first full season as a senior was 2012–13, as he appeared in 31 games (30 as a starter) for Sporting CP B in the Segunda Liga, with the team finishing in fourth position. On 8 January 2014 he was loaned to Vitória de Setúbal for the remainder of the campaign, starting in all but one Primeira Liga matches he appeared in and being voted the league's best young player for January and February.

On 31 May 2015, again with Sporting' main squad, João Mário started in the final of the Taça de Portugal against Braga, but was substituted in the first half due to the dismissal of defender Cédric Soares, in order to bring on Miguel Lopes; Sporting eventually won in a penalty shootout.

=== Inter Milan ===
On 27 August 2016, João Mário signed with Inter Milan for €40 million plus €5 million in bonuses. His maiden appearance in Serie A occurred on 11 September when he played the full 90 minutes in a 2–1 victory at Pescara, and his first goal for the team opened a loss by the same score at home to Cagliari on 16 October.

Under new manager Luciano Spalletti, João Mário grew increasingly frustrated about the lack of playing time. On 25 January 2018, he signed on loan for Premier League team West Ham United– the contract included a €1.5 million loan fee, and an option for the club to buy the player for a sum in the region of €40 million. He made his debut two days later, replacing Pablo Zabaleta at half-time in a 2–0 away loss to Wigan Athletic in the fourth round of the FA Cup.

João Mário scored his first goal for West Ham on 31 March 2018, helping the hosts to defeat Southampton 3–0. He made 14 competitive appearances during his half-season spell, scoring twice, and was praised for his work rate.

On 27 August 2019, João Mário joined Russian club Lokomotiv Moscow on a season-long loan. On 6 October 2020, also on loan, he returned to Sporting. He scored his first goal in his second spell on 27 December, from a penalty to close a 2–1 away win against B-SAD. He contributed another until the end of the campaign (from 28 appearances), helping his team to win the league for the first time in 19 years.

On 12 July 2021, Inter announced they had reached an agreement to early terminate João Mário's contract by mutual consent.

=== Benfica ===
João Mário joined Benfica on 13 July 2021, on a five-year deal. He scored his first competitive goal on 10 August, opening the 2–0 home victory over Spartak Moscow in the third qualifying round of the UEFA Champions League.

In the following edition of that tournament, João Mário scored four times in the group stage; this included a first-half penalty in a 2–1 away defeat of Juventus on 14 September 2022, and the sixth goal in the 92nd minute of the 6–1 win at Maccabi Haifa on 2 November that qualified his team as group winners on away goal difference. He added a career-best 17 in the league for the champions.

João Mário scored his first career hat-trick on 29 November 2023, with all goals coming in the first half of an eventual 3–3 home draw against his former club Inter Milan in the Champions League group phase; he also became the first player to achieve the feat for Benfica in the competition's format.

=== Beşiktaş ===
On 4 September 2024, João Mário was loaned to Beşiktaş until the end of the season. He scored seven goals in all competitions, adding four assists.

In June 2025, the mandatory €2 million purchase clause was activated and João Mário signed a permanent contract.

=== AEK Athens ===
On 12 September 2025, João Mário was loaned to Super League Greece club AEK Athens. On 10 May 2026, he scored a stoppage-time goal in a 2–1 victory over Panathinaikos to secure a 14th league title.

In September 2026, having mutually terminated his contract with Beşiktaş, João Mário agreed to a permanent deal.

== International career ==
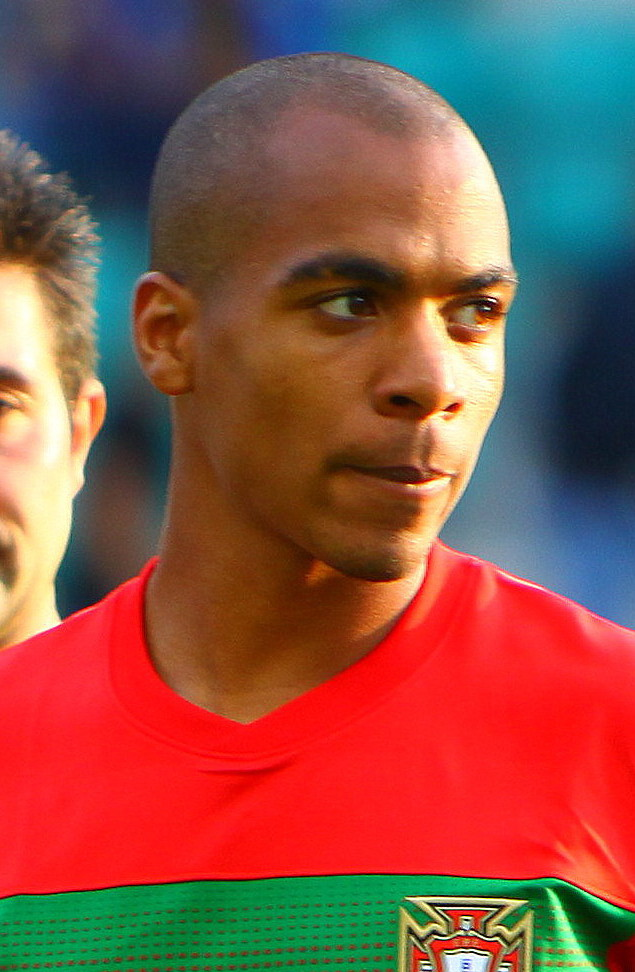
João Mário with the Portugal under-19 team in 2012

Of Angolan descent, João Mário earned 82 caps for Portugal at youth level, including 13 for the under-21 team. He made his senior debut on 11 October 2014, replacing Cristiano Ronaldo for the final 14 minutes of the friendly against France in Paris: soon after coming on, he was fouled by Paul Pogba for a penalty converted by Ricardo Quaresma, in an eventual 2–1 loss.

João Mário represented Portugal at the UEFA European Under-21 Championship in 2015, netting the only goal of their opening group win over England as the tournament ended with a runner-up finish. He was selected by the full side for their UEFA Euro 2016 campaign, starting in the first match, a 1–1 draw with Iceland in Saint-Étienne; he played in all of his team's seven games during Euro 2016, including the final against France which they won.

João Mário scored his first goal for the nation on 10 November 2017, closing the 3–0 friendly defeat of Saudi Arabia. Subsequently, he was included in the final squad for the 2018 FIFA World Cup.

In November 2022, João Mário was named in the squad for the 2022 World Cup in Qatar. On 28 May 2023, he announced his retirement from international play.

== Personal life ==
João Mário's older brother, Wilson, is also a footballer. He too graduated from Sporting's youth academy.

In June 2022, João Mário married Marta Branco Oliveira with whom he already had a 1-year-old daughter.

== Career statistics ==
=== Club ===
As of match played 28 October 2026

Appearances and goals by club, season and competition
Club	Season	League			National cup (Note: Includes Taça de Portugal, Coppa Italia, FA Cup, Turkish Cup, Greek Cup)		League cup (Note: Includes Taça da Liga)		Europe		Other		Total	
Club	Season	Division	Apps	Goals	Apps	Goals	Apps	Goals	Apps	Goals	Apps	Goals	Apps	Goals
Sporting CP	2011–12	Primeira Liga	0	0	0	0	0	0	1 (Note: Appearance(s) in UEFA Europa League)	0	—		1	0
Sporting CP	2012–13	Primeira Liga	1	0	0	0	0	0	0	0	—		1	0
Sporting CP	2014–15	Primeira Liga	30	5	6	2	0	0	8 (Note: Six appearances in UEFA Champions League, two appearances in UEFA Europa League)	0	—		44	7
Sporting CP	2015–16	Primeira Liga	33	6	2	0	2	0	7 (Note: Two appearances in UEFA Champions League, five appearances and one goal in UEFA Europa League)	1	1 (Note: Appearance in Supertaça Cândido de Oliveira)	0	45	7
Sporting CP	Total		64	11	8	2	2	0	16	1	1	0	91	14
Vitória Setúbal (loan)	2013–14	Primeira Liga	15	0	0	0	1	0	—		—		16	0
Inter Milan	2016–17	Serie A	30	3	2	0	—		0	0	—		32	3
Inter Milan	2017–18	Serie A	14	0	1	0	—		—		—		15	0
Inter Milan	2018–19	Serie A	20	1	2	0	—		0	0	—		22	1
Inter Milan	Total		64	4	5	0	—		0	0	—		69	4
West Ham United (loan)	2017–18	Premier League	13	2	1	0	—		—		—		14	2
Lokomotiv Moscow (loan)	2019–20	Russian Premier League	18	1	0	0	—		4 (Note: Appearances in UEFA Champions League)	0	—		22	1
Sporting CP (loan)	2020–21	Primeira Liga	28	2	3	0	3	0	0	0	—		34	2
Benfica	2021–22	Primeira Liga	28	3	2	0	3	0	12	1	—		45	4
Benfica	2022–23	Primeira Liga	33	17	4	0	0	0	14	6	—		51	23
Benfica	2023–24	Primeira Liga	31	3	6	2	3	1	10 (Note: Five appearances and three goals in UEFA Champions League, five appearances in UEFA Europa League)	3	1	0	51	9
Benfica	2024–25	Primeira Liga	2	0	—		—		—		—		2	0
Benfica	Total		94	23	12	2	6	1	36	10	1	0	149	36
Beşiktaş (loan)	2024–25	Süper Lig	27	5	4	1	—		6	1	—		37	7
Beşiktaş	2025–26	Süper Lig	2	0	—		—		6 (Note: Two appearances and one goal in UEFA Europa League, four appearances and two goals in UEFA Conference League)	3	—		8	3
Beşiktaş	Beşiktaş total		29	5	4	1	—		12	4	—		45	10
AEK Athens (loan)	2025–26	Super League Greece	26	2	5	1	—		—		—		31	3
AEK Athens	2026–27	Super League Greece	2	0	2	1	—		2	0	—		6	1
AEK Athens	AEK Athens total		28	2	7	2	—		2	0	—		37	4
Career total			353	50	40	7	12	1	70	15	2	0	477	73

=== International ===
Appearances and goals by national team and year
National team	Year	Apps	Goals
Portugal	2014	2	0
Portugal	2015	4	0
Portugal	2016	17	0
Portugal	2017	8	1
Portugal	2018	11	1
Portugal	2019	3	0
Portugal	2020	0	0
Portugal	2021	5	0
Portugal	2022	5	1
Portugal	2023	1	0
Total		56	3

Scores and results list Portugal's goal tally first, score column indicates score after each João Mário goal.

List of international goals scored by João Mário
No.	Date	Venue	Opponent	Score	Result	Competition
1	10 November 2017	Fontelo, Viseu, Portugal	Saudi Arabia	3–0	3–0	Friendly
2	28 May 2018	Estádio Municipal, Braga, Portugal	Tunisia	2–0	2–2	Friendly
3	17 November 2022	Estádio José Alvalade, Lisbon, Portugal	Nigeria	4–0	4–0	Friendly

== Honours ==
Sporting CP

- Primeira Liga: 2020–21
- Taça de Portugal: 2014–15
- Taça da Liga: 2020–21
- Supertaça Cândido de Oliveira: 2015

Benfica

- Primeira Liga: 2022–23
- Supertaça Cândido de Oliveira: 2023

AEK Athens

- Super League Greece: 2025–26

Portugal

- UEFA European Championship: 2016
- UEFA European Under-21 Championship runner-up: 2015

Individual

- Primeira Liga Team of the Year: 2022–23
- UEFA European Under-17 Championship Team of the Tournament: 2010

Orders

- Commander of the Order of Merit
