= Gonçalo Graça =

Portuguese footballer

Personal information
- Full name: Gonçalo Manuel Silva Graça
- Date of birth: 28 March 1990 (age 36)
- Place of birth: Vila do Conde, Portugal
- Height: 1.75 m (5 ft 9 in)
- Position: Winger

Youth career
- 2006–2009: Varzim

Senior career*
Years	Team	Apps	(Gls)
2009–2011	Varzim	26	(7)
2011–2014	Vitória Setúbal	4	(0)
2012–2013	→ Leixões (loan)	35	(2)
2014–2016	Leixões	77	(2)
2016–2017	Tirsense	34	(6)
2017	Rebordosa	8	(0)
2018	Tirsense	3	(0)
2018–2019	Esposende	21	(4)
- * Club domestic league appearances and goals as of 8 December 2019

Gonçalo Manuel Silva Graça (born 28 March 1990) is a Portuguese footballer who plays as a right winger.

== Football career ==
Born in Vila do Conde, Graça came through the youth ranks of nearby Varzim S.C. and made his professional debut on 1 August 2009 in the first round of the Taça da Liga away to C.D. Fátima, coming on as a last-minute substitute for Victor Júnior in a 2–0 loss. He was a regular in 2010–11 as the team from Póvoa de Varzim were relegated from the Liga de Honra, and scored seven goals including both in the first half of a 4–2 loss at C.F. Os Belenenses on 16 January 2011.

Graça then moved to Vitória de Setúbal, making his Primeira Liga debut on 23 October 2011 in a 1–0 loss at C.S. Marítimo as a substitute for Tengarrinha. He made only two more appearances off the bench over the season, and his only start was on 18 January 2012 in the league cup third round loss by a single goal at F.C. Paços de Ferreira. In August, he returned to the second tier on loan at Leixões SC.

From 2016, Graça dropped down to the district level, representing F.C. Tirsense, Rebordosa A.C. and A.D. Esposende.
