= Nuno Lopes (footballer, born 1986) =

Portuguese footballer

Personal information
- Full name: Nuno Miguel Almeida Costa Lopes
- Date of birth: 19 December 1986 (age 39)
- Place of birth: Lisbon, Portugal
- Height: 1.84 m (6 ft 0 in)
- Position: Right-back

Youth career
- 1995–1999: Oriental
- 1999–2002: Olivais Moscavide
- 2002–2005: Alverca

Senior career*
Years	Team	Apps	(Gls)
2005–2006	Sintrense		
2007	Lewes		
2007–2009	Operário	54	(8)
2009–2010	Boavista	27	(5)
2010–2012	Oliveirense	28	(2)
2012–2013	Beira-Mar	31	(0)
2013–2015	Rio Ave	20	(0)
2015–2017	Apollon Limassol	31	(1)
2017	Estoril	0	(0)
2018	União Madeira	11	(0)
2019–2022	Aris Limassol		
Total		202+	(16+)
- * Club domestic league appearances and goals

Nuno Miguel Almeida Costa Lopes (born 19 December 1986) is a Portuguese former professional footballer who played as a right-back.

== Club career ==
Born in Lisbon, Lopes spent until the age of 23 in lower league and amateur football. During that timeframe, he represented S.U. Sintrense, Lewes (English sixth division), CD Operário and Boavista FC.

Lopes made his professional debut in 2010–11, with U.D. Oliveirense, his first game in the competition occurring on 29 August 2010 as he played 68 minutes in a 1–0 home win against C.D. Fátima in the Segunda Liga. Late into the 2012 January transfer window he signed with Primeira Liga club S.C. Beira-Mar, contributing 19 matches in his first full season, which ended in relegation.

For the 2013–14 campaign, Lopes joined Rio Ave F.C. also in the top division on a two-year contract. During his tenure in Vila do Conde he played understudy to Brazilian Lionn and, in another winter transfer move, signed for Apollon Limassol FC of the Cypriot First Division.

Lopes then had brief spells with G.D. Estoril Praia – where he failed to appear in any matches due to a knee injury– and C.F. União. He returned to Cyprus on 2 August 2019, agreeing to a deal at Aris Limassol FC (Second Division).

== Personal life ==
Lopes' twin brother, Miguel, was also a footballer and a right-back. Both came through exactly the same youth system setup, with the exception of S.L. Benfica.

== Career statistics ==
As of 14 May 2016

Club	Season	League			Cup		Continental		Total	
Club	Season	Division	Apps	Goals	Apps	Goals	Apps	Goals	Apps	Goals
Operário	2007–08	Segunda Divisão	29	5	0	0	—		29	5
Operário	2008–09	Segunda Divisão	25	3	2	0	—		27	3
Operário	Total		54	8	2	0	—		56	8
Boavista	2009–10	Segunda Divisão	27	5	0	0	—		27	5
Oliveirense	2010–11	Segunda Liga	14	0	6	0	—		20	0
Oliveirense	2011–12	Segunda Liga	14	2	9	1	—		23	3
Oliveirense	Total		28	2	15	1	—		43	3
Beira-Mar	2011–12	Primeira Liga	12	0	0	0	—		12	0
Beira-Mar	2012–13	Primeira Liga	19	0	4	0	—		23	0
Beira-Mar	Total		31	0	4	0	—		35	0
Rio Ave	2013–14	Primeira Liga	13	0	2	0	—		15	0
Rio Ave	2014–15	Primeira Liga	7	0	5	0	3 (Note: Appearances in UEFA Europa League)	0	15	0
Rio Ave	Total		20	0	7	0	3	0	30	0
Apollon Limassol	2014–15	Cypriot First Division	15	1	0	0	0	0	15	1
Apollon Limassol	2015–16	Cypriot First Division	7	0	0	0	5	0	12	0
Apollon Limassol	Total		22	1	0	0	5	0	27	1
Career total			182	16	28	1	8	0	218	17
