= Bruninho (footballer, born 1988) =

Portuguese footballer

Personal information
- Full name: Bruno Filipe Lopes Correia
- Date of birth: 30 September 1988 (age 38)
- Place of birth: Vila Nova de Gaia, Portugal
- Height: 1.79 m (5 ft 10 1/2 in)
- Position: Winger

Youth career
- 1998−2005: Vilanovense
- 2005−2007: Candal

Senior career*
Years	Team	Apps	(Gls)
2007–2010	Candal		
2010–2012	Padroense	61	(28)
2012–2014	Vitória Setúbal	16	(2)
2014–2016	Penafiel	12	(0)
2016	Bragança	12	(1)
2016–2019	Mafra	96	(41)
2019–2021	Académico Viseu	26	(1)
2022	Leça	10	(1)
Total		233+	(74+)
- * Club domestic league appearances and goals

Bruno Filipe Lopes Correia (born 30 September 1988 in Vila Nova de Gaia, Porto District), known as Bruninho, is a Portuguese former professional footballer who played as a winger.
