= Javier Cohene =

Palestinian footballer (born 1987)

Personal information
- Full name: Javier Antonio Cohene Mereles
- Date of birth: 3 May 1987 (age 39)
- Place of birth: Pirayú, Paraguay
- Height: 1.87 m (6 ft 2 in)
- Position: Centre-back

Youth career
- 2004: Pirayu Sport

Senior career*
Years	Team	Apps	(Gls)
2005	General Díaz	–	(–)
2006	Gaúcho	–	(–)
2007	Passo Fundo	–	(–)
2007–2009	Olhanense	37	(2)
2009	River Plate	0	(0)
2010	Sportivo Luqueño	11	(0)
2010–2013	Paços Ferreira	58	(4)
2013–2014	Vitória Setúbal	18	(2)
2014–2015	Borac Čačak	6	(0)
2015–2016	Atlético CP	2	(0)

International career
2014	Palestine	1	(1)
- * Club domestic league appearances and goals

Javier Antonio Cohene Mereles (Arabic: خافيير كوهيني ميراليس; born 3 May 1987) is a professional footballer who played predominantly as a centre-back. Born in Paraguay, he played for the Palestine national team.

== Club career ==
After several short spells with General Díaz, and Brazilian clubs Gaúcho and Passo Fundo, Cohene moved to Europe to play in Portugal for second division side S.C. Olhanense, where he would remain for two seasons before moving back to South America to play for River Plate and Sportivo Luqueño.

In the summer of 2010, Cohene returned to Portugal to play for F.C. Paços de Ferreira. His first two, of his three seasons with Os Castores proved to be successful as he featured regularly in Paços' defense alongside Ricardo in the 2010–11 season, and Ozéia in the 2011–12 season. His first two seasons saw him make 60 appearances, and contributing six goals in the process. His first season with Paços de Ferreira would see Cohene help his side reach the 2011 Taça da Liga Final, where his side were defeated by Benfica.

The arrival of Paulo Fonseca at the Mata Real for the 2012–13 season saw Cohene feature less than previous seasons. He was primarily used as a back up to Ricardo and Tiago Valente, and would only feature regularly in domestic cup competitions. Despite Paços de Ferreira's historic third place league finish which granted qualification to the 2013–14 UEFA Champions League play-off round, Cohene left Paços in the summer of 2013.

Following his departure from Os Pacenses, Cohene signed for Vitória de Setúbal. He debuted for Os Sadinos on the 18 August against Porto. Cohene would score his first goal since arriving at Vitória on the 31 August, against Vitória de Guimarães in a 4–1 away win.

In Summer 2014, he moved for first time outside his comfort zone, which has been Latin America and the Iberian peninsula, and moved to South-eastern Europe, where he signed a contract with Serbian SuperLiga side FK Borac Čačak.

On following summer, he and Borac decided to terminate contract by mutual agreement, and Cohene left Serbia but did stayed in Europe, only hat this time he was back to Portugal, and, on 1 August 2015, Cohene joined Atlético CP.

== International career ==
Cohene committed to the Palestinian national team where he was eligible to play because of his Palestinian father. Known as Javier Mereles when playing for Palestine, he received his first call-up by Jamal Mahmoud for the Peace Cup taking place in September 2014. He scored his first goal on his debut against Chinese Taipei on 6 September 2014.

=== International goals ===
Scores and results list Palestine's goal tally first.

#	Date	Venue	Opponent	Score	Result	Competition	Refs
1.	6 September 2014	Rizal Memorial Stadium, Manila, Philippines	Chinese Taipei	1–0	7–3	2014 Philippine Peace Cup	
