= Ricardo Pateiro =

Portuguese footballer

Personal information
- Full name: Ricardo da Costa Pateiro
- Date of birth: 31 May 1980 (age 46)
- Place of birth: Palmela, Portugal
- Height: 1.78 m (5 ft 10 in)
- Position: Midfielder

Youth career
- 1990–1999: Vitória Setúbal

Senior career*
Years	Team	Apps	(Gls)
1999–2001	Lusitano Évora	19	(2)
2001–2004	Torreense	77	(13)
2004–2005	Pinhalnovense	36	(8)
2005–2008	Nacional	38	(1)
2008–2011	União Leiria	75	(2)
2011–2013	Rio Ave	11	(0)
2015	União Leiria	1	(0)
2015–2016	Pombal	13	(0)
Total		270	(24)
- * Club domestic league appearances and goals

Ricardo da Costa Pateiro (born 31 May 1980 in Palmela, Setúbal District) is a Portuguese retired footballer who played as a left midfielder.
