= Rafa Costa =

Portuguese footballer

Personal information
- Full name: Tiago Rafael Freitas Costa
- Date of birth: 27 January 1991 (age 35)
- Place of birth: Vizela, Portugal
- Height: 1.77 m (5 ft 10 in)
- Position: Winger

Team information
- Current team: Lixa

Youth career
- 2001–2010: Vitória Guimarães

Senior career*
Years	Team	Apps	(Gls)
2010−2013	Vitória Guimarães	3	(0)
2010−2011	→ Lousada (loan)	17	(7)
2011−2012	→ Portimonense (loan)	26	(3)
2012–2013	Vitória Guimarães B	24	(0)
2013−2015	Moreirense	0	(0)
2013–2015	→ Felgueiras 1932 (loan)	58	(0)
2015−2016	Cinfães	27	(1)
2016–2017	Amarante	26	(3)
2017–2019	Pedras Salgadas	55	(0)
2019–	Rebordosa	17	(0)
2020–	Lixa	10	(0)

International career
2007	Portugal U16	7	(0)
2008	Portugal U17	7	(2)
2009	Portugal U18	6	(0)
2010	Portugal U19	5	(0)
2011	Portugal U20	1	(0)
- * Club domestic league appearances and goals as of 1 August 2021

Tiago Rafael 'Rafa' Freitas Costa (born 27 January 1991) is a Portuguese footballer who plays as a winger for F.C. Lixa.
