= Nélson Pedroso =

Portuguese footballer

Personal information
- Full name: Nélson Miguel Martins Pedroso
- Date of birth: 18 June 1985 (age 41)
- Place of birth: Guimarães, Portugal
- Height: 1.80 m (5 ft 11 in)
- Position: Left-back

Team information
- Current team: Merelinense

Youth career
- 1993–1998: Aves
- 1998–2004: Vitória Guimarães
- 2000–2001: → Amigos Urgeses (loan)

Senior career*
Years	Team	Apps	(Gls)
2004–2006	Sandinenses	25	(3)
2006–2007	Oliveirense		
2007–2008	Ribeirão	29	(3)
2008–2009	Estrela Amadora	3	(0)
2009–2010	Portimonense	8	(0)
2010–2012	Aves	43	(6)
2012–2014	Vitória Setúbal	48	(0)
2014–2015	Paços Ferreira	10	(0)
2015–2017	Aves	73	(7)
2017–2019	Académica	41	(3)
2019–2020	Merelinense	18	(8)
2020–2021	Ribeirão	7	(1)
2021–	Merelinense	15	(1)
- * Club domestic league appearances and goals as of 14:26, 16 August 2022 (UTC)

Nélson Miguel Martins Pedroso (born 18 June 1985) is a Portuguese professional footballer who plays as a left-back for Merelinense.

== Club career ==
Pedroso was born in Guimarães. He started playing at the professional level at the age of 23, appearing in only three Primeira Liga games for C.F. Estrela da Amadora over one full season; the club was also relegated due to financial irregularities.

Pedroso subsequently competed in the Segunda Liga, where he represented C.D. Aves and Portimonense SC. Whilst at the service of the former team, he won the SJPF Player of the Month for October 2011.

On 1 August 2014, after two years as first choice with Vitória F.C. in the top division, Pedroso signed with F.C. Paços de Ferreira of the same league. The following 12 July, he returned to the second tier after agreeing to a two-year contract at Aves.

From 2017 to 2019, Pedroso also played in division two, with Académica de Coimbra.
