= Miguel Pedro =

Portuguese footballer

Personal information
- Full name: Miguel António Teixeira Ferreira Pedro
- Date of birth: 6 November 1983 (age 43)
- Place of birth: Porto, Portugal
- Height: 1.75 m (5 ft 9 in)
- Position: Attacking midfielder

Team information
- Current team: Maia Lidador

Youth career
- 1992–1994: Salgueiros
- 1994–1996: Boavista
- 1996–2002: Salgueiros

Senior career*
Years	Team	Apps	(Gls)
2002–2004	Salgueiros	50	(5)
2004–2006	Aves	53	(5)
2006–2009	Académica	82	(5)
2010–2011	Anorthosis	14	(0)
2010–2011	→ Ermis (loan)	21	(0)
2011–2012	Feirense	25	(2)
2012–2015	Vitória Setúbal	77	(2)
2015–2016	Panachaiki	26	(3)
2016–2018	Freamunde	42	(3)
2018–2019	Salgueiros	44	(5)
2019–	Maia Lidador		

International career
2003	Portugal U20	4	(0)
- * Club domestic league appearances and goals as of 5 May 2019

Miguel António Teixeira Ferreira Pedro (born 6 November 1983) is a Portuguese professional footballer who plays for F.C. Maia Lidador as an attacking midfielder.

== Club career ==
Born in Porto, Miguel Pedro began his professional career in the second division, playing two seasons each with S.C. Salgueiros and C.D. Aves, both in the north. In the summer of 2006 he moved to the Primeira Liga with Académica de Coimbra, making his competition debut on 28 August in a 1–1 away draw against Vitória F.C. and finishing his debut campaign with 26 games and two goals, as the Students maintained their division status.

In the following years, Miguel Pedro continued to be regularly played at Académica, although rarely as a starter. Also brought from the bench, he scored against FC Porto on 25 October 2009, but in a 2–3 away defeat; the following month he was sold to Anorthosis Famagusta F.C. in Cyprus, for three-and-a-half years and a €100,000 transfer fee.

However, Anorthosis did not pay the solidarity contribution tax to Salgueiros and Aves, and both clubs requested arbitration from the FIFA Dispute Resolution Chamber, eventually being ordered to pay. For 2010–11, Miguel Pedro was loaned to fellow First Division side Ermis Aradippou FC.

In July 2011, Miguel Pedro returned to his country, signing a two-year contract with C.D. Feirense who had just promoted to the top level.

== Club statistics ==
As of 12 May 2012

Club performance			League		Cup		League Cup		Continental		Total	
Season	Club	League	Apps	Goals	Apps	Goals	Apps	Goals	Apps	Goals	Apps	Goals
Portugal			League		Taça de Portugal		Taça da Liga		Europe		Total	
2002–03	Salgueiros	Segunda Liga	30	4	0	0	0	0	-	-	30	4
2003–04	Salgueiros	Segunda Liga	26	1	2	0	0	0	-	-	28	1
2004–05	Aves	Segunda Liga	22	1	2	1	0	0	-	-	24	2
2005–06	Aves	Segunda Liga	33	5	2	1	0	0	-	-	35	6
2006–07	Académica	Primeira Liga	29	2	2	1	0	0	-	-	31	3
2007–08	Académica	Primeira Liga	23	1	1	0	1	0	-	-	25	1
2008–09	Académica	Primeira Liga	26	0	0	0	4	1	-	-	30	1
2009–10	Académica	Primeira Liga	9	2	1	0	1	0	-	-	11	2
Cyprus			League		Cypriot Cup		League Cup		Europe		Total	
2009–10	Anorthosis	Cypriot First Division	14	0								
2010–11	Ermis	Cypriot First Division	21	0								
Portugal			League		Taça de Portugal		Taça da Liga		Europe		Total	
2011–12	Feirense	Primeira Liga	25	2	1	0	2	0	-	-	29	2
Total	Portugal		223	18	11	3	8	1	-	-	242	22
Total	Cyprus		35	0								
Total	Country		258	18								
