= Adama François Sene =

Senegalese footballer

François Sene
Personal information
- Full name: Adama François Sene
- Date of birth: 30 November 1989 (age 36)
- Place of birth: Dakar, Senegal
- Height: 1.94 m (6 ft 4 1/2 in)
- Position: Centre-back

Youth career
- 2007–2008: Boavista

Senior career*
Years	Team	Apps	(Gls)
2008–2009	Boavista	21	(0)
2009–2011	Vitória Setúbal	13	(0)
2011–2012	Beijing Guoan	13	(0)
2013−2016	Vitória Setúbal	37	(0)
2016	Hajer	12	(0)
2016−2017	Al-Khaleej	22	(2)
2017−2018	Al Shamal	0	(0)
2019−2020	US Gorée	0	(0)
2020−	Vitória Setúbal	0	(0)
- * Club domestic league appearances and goals as of 19:21, 25 August 2016 (UTC)

Adama François Sene (born 30 November 1989 in Dakar) is a Senegalese footballer who plays as a centre back for Al Shamal.

Sene previously played for Boavista F.C. in the Liga de Honra and Vitória F.C. in the Primeira Liga. In 2011, he moved to Beijing Guoan F.C. in the Chinese Super League. In July 2013, he returned to Portugal, joining his previous club Vitória Setúbal.

== Career statistics ==
Appearances and goals by club, season and competition
Club	Season	League			National Cup		League Cup		Continental		Other		Total	
Club	Season	Division	Apps	Goals	Apps	Goals	Apps	Goals	Apps	Goals	Apps	Goals	Apps	Goals
Boavista	2008–09	Segunda Divisão	21	0	1	0	0	0	—		—		22	0
Vitória Setúbal	2009–10	Primeira Liga	2	0	0	0	0	0	—		—		2	0
Vitória Setúbal	2010–11	Primeira Liga	11	0	2	0	0	0	—		—		13	0
Vitória Setúbal	Total		13	0	2	0	0	0	—		—		15	0
Beijing Guoan	2011	Chinese Super League	11	0	2	0	—		—		—		13	0
Beijing Guoan	2012	Chinese Super League	1	0	0	0	—		1	0	—		2	0
Beijing Guoan	Total		12	0	2	0	—		1	0	—		15	0
Vitória Setúbal	2013–14	Primeira Liga	10	0	0	0	4	0	—		—		14	0
Vitória Setúbal	2014–15	Primeira Liga	26	0	2	0	1	0	—		—		29	0
Vitória Setúbal	2015–16	Primeira Liga	1	0	1	1	1	0	—		—		3	1
Vitória Setúbal	Total		37	0	3	1	6	0	—		—		46	1
Hajer	2015–16	Saudi Pro League	12	0	0	0	—		—		—		12	0
Al-Khaleej	2016–17	Saudi Pro League	22	2	1	1	1	0	—		—		24	3
Al Shamal	2017–18	Qatari Second Division	0	0	0	0	—		—		—		0	0
US Gorée	2019–20	Senegal Premier League	0	0	0	0	—		—		—		0	0
Vitória Setúbal	2020–21	Campeonato de Portugal	8	0	0	0	—		—		—		8	0
Vitória Setúbal	2021–22	Liga 3	8	0	2	0	—		—		—		10	0
Vitória Setúbal	2022–23	Liga 3	16	0	3	1	—		—		—		19	1
Vitória Setúbal	Total		32	0	5	1	—		—		—		37	1
Ribeirão	2023–24	Campeonato de Portugal	6	0	1	0	—		—		—		7	0
Career total			155	2	15	3	7	0	1	0	0	0	178	5
