= Coronas (footballer) =

Portuguese footballer (born 1990)

Personal information
- Full name: Pedro Emanuel Moreira de Sousa
- Date of birth: 19 September 1990 (age 36)
- Place of birth: Rans, Portugal
- Height: 1.78 m (5 ft 10 in)
- Positions: Right-back; midfielder

Youth career
- 2001−2009: Penafiel

Senior career*
Years	Team	Apps	(Gls)
2009−2013	Penafiel	90	(8)
2013−2014	Vitória Setúbal	8	(0)
2014−2016	Moreirense	31	(0)
2016−2019	Marítimo	7	(0)
2017–2018	→ Académica (loan)	0	(0)
2018–2019	→ Cova Piedade (loan)	30	(0)
2019−2021	Penafiel	39	(1)
2021−2023	Leixões	26	(0)
2023−2024	Alpendorada	27	(1)
Total		258	(10)
- * Club domestic league appearances and goals

Pedro Emanuel Moreira de Sousa (born 19 September 1990 in Rans, Penafiel), commonly known as Coronas, is a Portuguese former professional footballer who played mainly as a right-back.
