= Ozéia =

Brazilian footballer

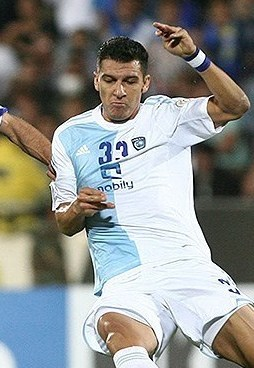

Personal information
- Full name: Ozéia de Paula Maciel
- Date of birth: January 2, 1982 (age 44)
- Place of birth: Nonoai (RS), Brazil
- Height: 1.91 m (6 ft 3 in)
- Position: Centre back

Team information
- Current team: Busaiteen Club
- Number: 3

Youth career
- 2000: Santa Cruz-RS

Senior career*
Years	Team	Apps	(Gls)
2005	Rio Branco	?	(?)
2006	Santo André	?	(?)
2007	Coritiba	?	(?)
2007	Ituano	?	(?)
2008	Gama	?	(?)
2008	→ Avaí (loan)	?	(?)
2008–2012	Paços de Ferreira	67	(3)
2010	→ Grêmio (loan)	21	(0)
2012–	Criciúma	22	(2)
2013	Al Hilal	8	(1)
2013	→ Vitoria de Setubal	8	(0)
2014	Bahrain Riffa Club	6	(2)
2015	Busaiteen Club	?	(?)
- * Club domestic league appearances and goals as of 12 March 2013 (UTC)

Ozéia de Paula Maciel (born January 2, 1982) is a Brazilian football player currently playing for Criciúma.

== Career ==
On 1 March 2010 Grêmio Porto Alegre made official his arrival at Paços de Ferreira, of the Brazilian defender, the footballer is tied to the Portuguese by a contract until 2012, and transfer on loan until December 2010.

== Honours ==
Al-Hilal

- Crown Prince Cup: 2013
