= Hugo Gomes (footballer, born 1979) =

Portuguese footballer

Personal information
- Full name: Hugo André Viriato Santos Gomes
- Date of birth: 11 October 1979 (age 47)
- Place of birth: Faro, Portugal
- Height: 1.75 m (5 ft 9 in)
- Position: Right back

Youth career
- 1987–1998: Farense

Senior career*
Years	Team	Apps	(Gls)
1998–2004	Farense	61	(0)
1998–1999	→ Desportivo Beja (loan)	19	(1)
1999–2000	→ Juventude Évora (loan)	19	(0)
2000–2001	→ Almancilense (loan)		
2004–2006	Portosantense	51	(0)
2006–2008	Pontassolense	57	(0)
2008–2009	Estrela Amadora	29	(0)
2009–2012	União Leiria	34	(0)
2012–2013	União Madeira	17	(0)
2013–2014	Portimonense	12	(0)
2014–2015	Quarteirense	8	(0)
2016–2017	11 Esperanças		
Total		307	(1)

International career
1999	Portugal U20	2	(0)
- * Club domestic league appearances and goals

Hugo André Viriato Santos Gomes (born 11 October 1979 in Faro, Algarve) is a Portuguese former professional footballer who played as a right back.
