= Tiago Terroso =

Portuguese footballer

Personal information
- Full name: Tiago André Ramos Terroso
- Date of birth: 13 January 1988 (age 38)
- Place of birth: Vila do Conde, Portugal
- Height: 1.78 m (5 ft 10 in)
- Position: Midfielder

Youth career
- 1999–2003: Rio Ave
- 2003–2004: Padroense
- 2004–2005: Porto
- 2005–2007: Rio Ave

Senior career*
Years	Team	Apps	(Gls)
2007–2010	Rio Ave	7	(1)
2008–2009	→ Pampilhosa (loan)	30	(4)
2010–2011	Varzim	29	(3)
2011–2012	União Leiria	15	(0)
2012	Chornomorets	7	(0)
2013	Olhanense	13	(0)
2013–2015	Vitória Setúbal	15	(1)
2015	Varzim B	3	(0)
Total		119	(9)
- * Club domestic league appearances and goals

Tiago André Ramos Terroso (born 13 January 1988) is a Portuguese former professional footballer who played as a midfielder.

== Club career ==
Born in Vila do Conde, Terroso spent most of his youth career with hometown club Rio Ave FC, as well as a year in the ranks of FC Porto. He made his first senior appearances (three games) for the former in the Liga de Honra in the 2006–07 season, and after a loan to F.C. Pampilhosa of the third division he added a further four matches in the Primeira Liga in 2009–10, three from the bench.

Terroso then moved up the road to Varzim S.C. of the second tier, and a year later U.D. Leiria in the first. In February 2012, he moved abroad for the first time to FC Chornomorets Odesa of the Ukrainian Premier League on a contract until June 2014.

Rarely used during his time in Eastern Europe, Terroso returned to his country's top flight in January 2013, signing for S.C. Olhanense on a 2 1/2-year deal. In June that year, he moved across the league to Vitória F.C. in a deal valid for two seasons.

After his contract with the club from Setúbal expired, Terroso was unemployed up to November 2015, when he and Tiago Cintra were taken on by Varzim. He made three appearances for the reserve team, in division three.
