= Ramón Cardozo =

Paraguayan footballer (born 1986)

Personal information
- Full name: Ramón Idalecio Cardozo
- Date of birth: 23 April 1986 (age 40)
- Place of birth: Villarrica, Paraguay
- Height: 1.90 m (6 ft 3 in)
- Position: Forward

Youth career
- Tacuary

Senior career*
Years	Team	Apps	(Gls)
2006–2016	Tacuary	92	(18)
2007	→ Penafiel (loan)	7	(1)
2010	→ Cerro Porteño (loan)	18	(4)
2012	→ León Huánuco (loan)	19	(6)
2013	→ Nacional (loan)	16	(2)
2013–2014	→ Vitória Setúbal (loan)	20	(6)
2014–2016	→ Moreirense (loan)	25	(3)
2016–2017	Deportivo Capiatá	4	(1)
2017	Independiente	18	(3)
2017–2018	Crucero Norte	25	(7)
2018	Independiente	8	(0)

International career
2011	Paraguay	1	(0)
- * Club domestic league appearances and goals as of 20 January 2019

Ramón Idalecio Cardozo (born 23 April 1986) is a Paraguayan professional footballer who plays as a forward.

== Club career ==
Born in Villarrica, Guairá Department, Cardozo played most of his professional career with Tacuary. In January 2007 he was loaned to F.C. Penafiel in Portugal, being sparingly used by the second division club during his five-month spell, in an eventual eighth-place finish.

Cardozo returned to Portugal in 2013, going on to represent, always in the Primeira Liga, Vitória F.C. and Moreirense FC. Three years later he moved back to his country, signing with Deportivo Capiatá.

== International career ==
Cardozo earned his only cap for Paraguay on 25 May 2011, coming on as a 77th-minute substitute for Pablo Zeballos in a 2–4 friendly loss against Argentina in Resistencia, Chaco.

== Personal life ==
In spite of the same surname, a similar nickname ("Tacuarita") and physical resemblance, Cardozo was not related to Óscar Cardozo, who was also a footballer and a forward who played with team and individual success with S.L. Benfica, and was also a longtime Paraguay international.
