= Sérgio Semedo =

Cape Verdean/Portuguese footballer

Personal information
- Full name: Sérgio Manuel Monteiro Semedo
- Date of birth: 23 February 1988 (age 38)
- Place of birth: Lisbon, Portugal
- Height: 1.84 m (6 ft 0 in)
- Position: Midfielder

Team information
- Current team: Esperança Lagos

Youth career
- 1996–2006: CAC Pontinha
- 2006–2007: Estrela Amadora

Senior career*
Years	Team	Apps	(Gls)
2007–2008	1º Dezembro		
2008–2009	Futebol Benfica	26	(4)
2009–2011	Pinhalnovense	51	(3)
2011–2012	Portimonense	27	(2)
2012–2015	Marítimo	10	(0)
2013	Marítimo B	4	(0)
2013–2014	→ Portimonense (loan)	36	(3)
2014–2015	→ Olhanense (loan)	20	(5)
2015	→ Gil Vicente (loan)	14	(0)
2015–2016	Feirense	42	(1)
2017	Apollon Limassol	12	(1)
2017	Sūduva	2	(0)
2018	Leixões	7	(0)
2019	Covilhã	11	(0)
2019–2020	Onisilos	16	(0)
2021	Vilaverdense	7	(0)
2021–2022	Olhanense	26	(2)
2022–	Esperança Lagos	22	(5)

International career
2014–2017	Cape Verde	6	(0)
- * Club domestic league appearances and goals as of 01:20, 19 April 2023 (UTC)

Sérgio Manuel Monteiro Semedo (born 23 February 1988) is a Cape Verdean professional footballer who plays for Portuguese club C.F. Esperança de Lagos as a midfielder.

== Club career ==
Born in Lisbon, Portugal, Semedo spent one decade in the youth system of local Clube Atlético e Cultural, then played lower league or amateur football until the age of 23 while working at a supermarket to make ends meet. In the summer of 2011, he signed with Portimonense S.C. of the Segunda Liga.

Semedo made his debut in the Primeira Liga in the 2012–13 season, with C.S. Marítimo, his first game in the competition occurring on 18 August 2012 by starting and playing 53 minutes in a 1–0 away win against Rio Ave FC. In the following years he competed in the second division, on loan to former side Portimonense and S.C. Olhanense.

Semedo returned to the top flight midway through the 2014–15 campaign, signing with Gil Vicente F.C. again on loan. He moved back to division two the following summer, joining C.D. Feirense and helping them promote in his first year – 30 matches, 24 starts – after which he renewed his contract.

In another winter transfer market move, Semedo switched to the Cypriot First Division with Apollon Limassol FC. He represented a further two clubs in less than one year, FK Sūduva Marijampolė in Lithuania and Leixões S.C. from the Portuguese second tier.

In January 2019, Semedo almost signed with FC Dunărea Călărași, recently promoted to the Romanian Liga I, but the deal eventually fell through. Safe for one year in the Cypriot Second Division, he remained in Portugal until his retirement.

== International career ==
Portuguese-born, Semedo opted to represent Cape Verde internationally through descent, his debut coming on 19 November 2014 in a 1–0 away defeat to Zambia for the 2015 Africa Cup of Nations qualifiers.

== Honours ==
Apollon Limassol

- Cypriot Cup: 2016–17

Sūduva

- A Lyga: 2017
