= 2013–14 Primeira Liga =

80th season of top-tier Portuguese football

Primeira Liga
- Season: 2013–14
- Dates: 16 August 2013 – 11 May 2014
- Champions: Benfica; 33rd title
- Relegated: Olhanense
- Champions League: Benfica; Sporting CP; Porto
- Europa League: Rio Ave; Nacional; Estoril
- Matches: 240
- Goals: 569 (2.37 per match)
- Best player: Enzo Pérez
- Top goalscorer: Jackson Martínez (20 goals)
- Best goalkeeper: Jan Oblak
- Biggest home win: Sporting CP 5–1 Arouca (18 August 2013); Sporting CP 4–0 V. Setúbal (5 October 2013); Sporting CP 4–0 Paços de Ferreira (1 December 2013); Porto 4–0 Olhanense (20 December 2013); V. Setúbal 4–0 Paços de Ferreira (23 February 2014); Estoril 4–0 Olhanense (1 March 2014); Benfica 4–0 Rio Ave (7 April 2014)
- Biggest away win: Paços de Ferreira 0–5 Nacional (19 April 2014)
- Highest scoring: Marítimo 3–4 Paços de Ferreira (28 September 2013)
- Longest winning run: 11 games Benfica
- Longest unbeaten run: 28 games Benfica
- Longest winless run: 11 games Gil Vicente
- Longest losing run: 5 games Braga; Olhanense; Gil Vicente; Marítimo
- Highest attendance: 63,982; Benfica 2–0 Olhanense (20 April 2014)
- Lowest attendance: 585; Olhanense 1–0 Arouca (26 October 2013); 0 (closed doors); Nacional 0–1 Arouca (15 September 2013)
- Total attendance: 2,451,968
- Average attendance: 10,217

The 2013–14 Primeira Liga (also known as Liga ZON Sagres for sponsorship reasons) was the 80th season of the Primeira Liga, the top professional league for Portuguese association football clubs. It began on 18 August 2013 and concluded on 11 May 2014. Sixteen teams contested the league, fourteen of which took part in the previous season and two of which were promoted from the Segunda Liga. On 20 April 2014, Benfica won the Primeira Liga for a record 33rd time with a 2–0 victory over Olhanense, with two matches to spare.

== Teams ==
=== Stadia and locations ===
Location of teams in Liga Zon Sagres 2013–14
Location of teams in Liga Zon Sagres 2013–14

Team	Home City	Stadium	Capacity	2012–13 finish	Head manager
Académica	Coimbra	Estádio Cidade de Coimbra	30,210	11th	Sérgio Conceição
Arouca	Arouca	Estádio Municipal de Arouca	5,000	2nd in Segunda Liga	Pedro Emanuel
Belenenses	Lisbon	Estádio do Restelo	19,300	1st in Segunda Liga	Lito Vidigal
Benfica	Lisbon	Estádio da Luz	65,647	2nd	Jorge Jesus
Braga	Braga	Estádio Municipal de Braga	30,154	4th	Jesualdo Ferreira
Estoril	Estoril	Estádio António Coimbra da Mota	5,015	5th	Marco Silva
Gil Vicente	Barcelos	Estádio Cidade de Barcelos	12,504	13th	João de Deus
Marítimo	Funchal	Estádio dos Barreiros	9,177	10th	Pedro Martins
Nacional	Funchal	Estádio da Madeira	5,142	8th	Manuel Machado
Olhanense	Olhão	Estádio José Arcanjo	5,661	14th	Abel Xavier
Paços de Ferreira	Paços de Ferreira	Estádio Capital do Móvel	5,255	3rd	Costinha
Porto	Porto	Estádio do Dragão	52,002	1st	Paulo Fonseca
Rio Ave	Vila do Conde	Estádio dos Arcos	12,820	6th	Nuno Espírito Santo
Sporting CP	Lisbon	Estádio José Alvalade	52,466	7th	Leonardo Jardim
Vitória de Guimarães	Guimarães	Estádio D. Afonso Henriques	30,146	9th	Rui Vitória
Vitória de Setúbal	Setúbal	Estádio do Bonfim	18,692	12th	José Mota

=== Personnel and kits ===
Note: Flags indicate national team as has been defined under FIFA eligibility rules. Players and Managers may hold more than one non-FIFA nationality.

Team	Head coach	Captain	Kit manufacturer	Shirt sponsor
Académica	Sérgio Conceição	Ricardo	Nike	EFAPEL
Arouca	Pedro Emanuel	Bruno Amaro	Macron	Banco BIC
Belenenses	Lito Vidigal	Fernando Ferreira	Nike	Metlife
Benfica	Jorge Jesus	Luisão	Adidas	MEO (H) / Moche (A)
Braga	Jorge Paixão	Alan	Macron	Banco BIC
Estoril	Marco Silva	Vagner	Hummel	Banco BIC
Gil Vicente	João de Deus	César Peixoto	Macron	Barcelos
Marítimo	Pedro Martins	Briguel	Lacatoni	Banif
Nacional	Manuel Machado	João Aurélio	Hummel	Banif
Olhanense	Giuseppe Galderisi	Rui Duarte	Lacatoni	OLX
Paços de Ferreira	Jorge Costa	Filipe Anunciação	Lacatoni	Banco BIC
Porto	Luís Castro	Helton	Nike	MEO (H) / Moche (A) / PT (Alt.)
Rio Ave	Nuno Espírito Santo	Tarantini	Lacatoni	ASC ENGENHARIA E CONSTRUÇÃO
Sporting CP	Leonardo Jardim	Rui Patrício	Puma	MEO (H) / Moche (A)
Vitória de Guimarães	Rui Vitória	Leonel Olímpio	Nike	BK
Vitória de Setúbal	José Couceiro	Pedro Queirós	Hummel	Kia

=== Managerial changes ===
Team	Outgoing manager	Manner of departure	Date of vacancy	Position in table	Incoming manager	Date of appointment
Arouca	Vítor Oliveira	Resigned	18 May 2013	Pre-season	Pedro Emanuel	6 June 2013
Sporting CP	Jesualdo Ferreira	Contract expired	19 May 2013	Pre-season	Leonardo Jardim	20 May 2013
Gil Vicente	Paulo Alves	Resigned	21 May 2013	Pre-season	João de Deus	28 May 2013
Braga	José Peseiro	Mutual agreement	28 May 2013	Pre-season	Jesualdo Ferreira	29 May 2013
Porto	Vítor Pereira	Contract expired	8 June 2013	Pre-season	Paulo Fonseca	10 June 2013
Paços de Ferreira	Paulo Fonseca	Resigned	10 June 2013	Pre-season	Costinha	11 June 2013
Olhanense	Bruno Saraiva	Resigned	29 June 2013	Pre-season	Abel Xavier	6 July 2013
Belenenses	Mitchell van der Gaag	Health issues	26 September 2013	15th	Marco Paulo	26 September 2013
Vitória de Setúbal	José Mota	Resigned	7 October 2013	14th	José Couceiro	8 October 2013
Olhanense	Abel Xavier	Resigned	28 October 2013	11th	Paulo Alves	29 October 2013
Paços de Ferreira	Costinha	Resigned	28 October 2013	16th	Henrique Calisto	30 October 2013
Olhanense	Paulo Alves	Resigned	7 January 2014	16th	Giuseppe Galderisi	7 January 2014
Braga	Jesualdo Ferreira	Mutual agreement	23 February 2014	7th	Jorge Paixão	25 February 2014
Paços de Ferreira	Henrique Calisto	Resigned	24 February 2014	16th	Jorge Costa	25 February 2014
Porto	Paulo Fonseca	Sacked	5 March 2014	3rd	Luís Castro	5 March 2014

== League table ==
Pos	Team	Pld	W	D	L	GF	GA	GD	Pts	Qualification or relegation
1	Benfica (C)	30	23	5	2	58	18	+40	74	Qualification to Champions League group stage
2	Sporting CP	30	20	7	3	54	20	+34	67	Qualification to Champions League group stage
3	Porto	30	19	4	7	57	25	+32	61	Qualification to Champions League play-off round
4	Estoril	30	15	9	6	42	26	+16	54	Qualification to Europa League group stage
5	Nacional	30	11	12	7	43	33	+10	45	Qualification to Europa League play-off round
6	Marítimo	30	11	8	11	40	44	−4	41	
7	Vitória de Setúbal	30	10	9	11	41	41	0	39	
8	Académica	30	9	10	11	25	35	−10	37 (Note: Académica ahead of Braga on head-to-head record; Académica–Braga 1–1, Braga–Académica 0–1)	
9	Braga	30	10	7	13	39	37	+2	37	
10	Vitória de Guimarães	30	10	5	15	30	35	−5	35	
11	Rio Ave	30	8	8	14	21	35	−14	32	Qualification to Europa League third qualifying round (Note: Since the 2013–14 Taça de Portugal winners Benfica qualified for the 2014–15 UEFA Champions League, runners-up Rio Ave took the 2014-15 UEFA Europa League third qualifying round spot.)
12	Arouca	30	8	7	15	28	42	−14	31 (Note: Arouca ahead of Gil Vicente on head-to-head record; Gil Vicente–Arouca 0–3, Arouca–Gil Vicente 1–0)	
13	Gil Vicente	30	8	7	15	23	37	−14	31	
14	Belenenses	30	6	10	14	19	33	−14	28	
15	Paços de Ferreira (O)	30	6	6	18	28	59	−31	24 (Note: Paços de Ferreira ahead of Olhanense on head-to-head record; Paços de Ferreira–Olhanense 3–1, Olhanense–Paços de Ferreira 1–0)	Qualification to relegation play-offs
16	Olhanense (R)	30	6	6	18	21	49	−28	24	Relegation to Segunda Liga

Source: LPFP (in Portuguese)
Rules for classification: 1) Points; 2) Head-to-head points; 3) Head-to-head goal difference; 4) Head-to-head away goals scored; 5) Goal difference; 6) Matches won; 7) Goals scored; 8) Play-off.
(Note: LPFP decided that only criteria 1, 5, 6 and 7 would be applied to establish the classification during the competition.)
(C) Champions; (O) Play-off winners; (R) Relegated

=== Positions by round ===
Team ╲ Round	1	2	3	4	5	6	7	8	9	10	11	12	13	14	15	16	17	18	19	20	21	22	23	24	25	26	27	28	29	30
Benfica	9	8	7	5	4	5	3	3	3	3	2	3	3	3	1	1	1	1	1	1	1	1	1	1	1	1	1	1	1	1
Sporting CP	1	1	2	2	3	2	2	2	2	2	1	1	1	1	2	2	2	3	3	2	2	2	2	2	2	2	2	2	2	2
Porto	3	2	1	1	1	1	1	1	1	1	3	2	2	2	3	3	3	2	2	3	3	3	3	3	3	3	3	3	3	3
Estoril	3	4	3	4	5	4	6	4	5	4	5	4	4	4	4	4	5	5	4	4	4	4	4	4	4	4	4	4	4	4
Nacional	10	11	8	11	9	6	4	6	6	6	6	6	5	6	5	6	4	4	5	5	5	5	5	5	5	5	5	5	5	5
Marítimo	8	10	11	6	8	9	10	13	15	12	11	11	11	10	11	11	10	11	8	8	8	8	8	9	10	7	8	6	6	6
Vitória de Setúbal	10	13	12	14	13	12	14	15	11	10	12	9	10	11	12	12	11	9	11	9	10	10	9	8	11	8	8	8	8	7
Académica	12	16	14	13	14	14	15	12	14	11	9	12	12	12	10	9	8	10	9	10	9	9	10	10	7	9	9	9	9	8
Braga	5	5	6	3	2	3	5	8	9	9	8	10	7	7	7	7	7	6	7	7	7	6	6	6	6	6	6	7	7	9
Vitória de Guimarães	5	6	9	7	10	10	9	7	7	7	7	7	6	5	6	5	6	7	6	6	6	7	7	7	8	10	10	10	10	10
Rio Ave	2	3	4	8	6	8	8	9	8	8	10	8	9	9	8	8	9	8	10	11	11	12	11	11	9	11	11	11	11	11
Arouca	16	15	13	10	11	11	12	14	13	16	15	14	14	14	13	13	13	13	13	12	13	13	13	13	13	13	13	12	12	12
Gil Vicente	5	7	5	9	7	7	7	5	4	5	4	5	8	8	9	10	12	12	12	13	12	11	12	12	12	12	12	13	13	13
Belenenses	15	13	16	15	15	15	11	10	10	13	13	13	13	13	14	14	14	14	14	14	14	14	15	16	15	15	14	14	14	14
Paços de Ferreira	12	12	15	16	16	16	16	16	16	15	16	16	16	15	16	16	15	16	16	16	16	16	14	14	14	14	15	15	16	15
Olhanense	12	9	10	12	12	13	13	11	12	14	14	15	15	16	15	15	16	15	15	15	15	15	16	15	16	16	16	16	15	16

Leader
2014–15 UEFA Champions League Group stage
2014–15 UEFA Champions League Play-off round
2014–15 UEFA Europa League Play-off round
2014–15 UEFA Europa League Third qualifying round
Relegation to 2014–15 Segunda Liga

== Results ==
Each team will play each other twice, once at home and once away. Giving a total of 30 matches per team to be played.

Home \ Away	ACA	ARO	BEL	BEN	ESP	GVI	MAR	NAC	OLH	PAÇ	POR	RAV	SCP	BRA	VGU	VSE
Académica		0–0	2–1	0–3	0–1	1–0	1–1	0–0	2–1	4–2	1–0	0–1	0–4	1–1	0–0	1–1
Arouca	0–3		2–0	0–2	1–2	1–0	1–2	1–1	2–0	0–0	1–3	1–0	1–2	0–1	0–2	1–0
Belenenses	0–0	1–0		0–1	0–0	0–0	1–0	2–3	2–0	1–1	1–1	0–3	0–1	2–1	3–1	1–3
Benfica	3–0	2–2	1–1		2–0	2–1	2–0	2–0	2–0	3–1	2–0	4–0	2–0	1–0	1–0	1–1
Estoril	1–1	1–1	1–1	1–2		2–0	1–0	3–1	4–0	1–0	2–2	0–1	0–0	2–1	0–2	0–2
Gil Vicente	2–0	0–3	0–1	1–1	0–0		1–1	1–0	1–1	2–1	1–2	1–2	0–2	1–0	1–0	1–0
Marítimo	3–1	1–0	2–0	2–1	1–3	3–2		2–2	1–1	3–4	1–0	1–0	1–3	2–2	2–1	1–0
Nacional	1–0	0–1	2–0	2–4	2–2	2–0	2–0		0–0	2–1	2–1	1–1	1–1	3–0	1–1	2–2
Olhanense	0–1	1–0	0–0	2–3	1–2	2–1	1–1	1–1		1–0	2–1	0–1	0–2	0–2	0–1	2–1
Paços de Ferreira	2–4	3–1	1–0	0–2	0–3	0–2	3–1	0–5	3–1		0–1	0–0	1–3	0–2	1–3	1–1
Porto	3–1	4–1	1–0	2–1	0–1	2–0	3–0	1–1	4–0	3–0		3–0	3–1	2–0	1–0	3–0
Rio Ave	0–0	1–1	1–0	1–3	0–2	0–1	1–1	0–3	1–2	0–0	1–3		1–2	1–1	0–1	2–0
Sporting CP	0–0	5–1	3–0	1–1	0–1	2–0	3–2	0–0	1–0	4–0	1–0	1–1		2–1	1–0	4–0
Braga	0–1	2–2	2–1	0–1	3–2	4–1	1–1	2–1	4–1	1–1	1–3	0–1	1–2		3–0	2–0
Vitória de Guimarães	3–0	2–3	0–0	0–1	1–3	0–0	1–0	1–2	2–0	1–2	2–2	1–0	0–1	1–0		1–4
Vitória de Setúbal	1–0	1–0	0–0	0–2	1–1	2–2	2–4	3–0	3–1	4–0	1–3	2–0	2–2	1–1	3–2	

Source: LPFP (in Portuguese)
Legend: Blue = home team win; Yellow = draw; Red = away team win.

== Relegation play-offs ==
Paços de Ferreira, who finished 15th, faced Desportivo das Aves, the fourth-placed side of the 2013–14 Segunda Liga (third-placed among non-reserve teams) for a two-legged play-off to decide the 18th team to compete in the expanded 2014–15 Primeira Liga. Paços de Ferreira defeated Desportivo das Aves 3–1 on aggregate to secure their presence in the next Primeira Liga season.

=== First leg ===
16 May 2014
20:15 UTC

Desportivo das Aves	0–0	Paços de Ferreira

Estádio do CD das Aves, Vila das Aves
Attendance: 5,504
Referee: Hugo Miguel

=== Second leg ===
21 May 2014
20:15 UTC

Paços de Ferreira	3–1	Desportivo das Aves
Bébé 25'; Seri 44'; Minhoca 84'		Martins 78'

Estádio Capital do Móvel, Paços de Ferreira
Attendance: 4,607
Referee: Duarte Gomes

== Season statistics ==
=== Scoring ===
- First goal: Paulo Vinícius for Braga against Paços de Ferreira (16 August 2013)
- Largest winning margin: 5 goals
  - Paços de Ferreira 0–5 Nacional (19 April 2014)
- Highest scoring game: 7 goals
  - Marítimo 3–4 Paços de Ferreira (28 September 2013)
- Most goals scored in a match by a single team: 5 goals
  - Sporting 5–1 Arouca (18 August 2013)
  - Paços de Ferreira 0–5 Nacional (19 April 2014)
- Most goals scored in a match by a losing team: 3 goals
  - Marítimo 3–4 Paços de Ferreira (28 September 2013)

=== Top goalscorers ===
Rank	Player	Club	Goals
1	(Colombia) Jackson Martínez	Porto	20
2	(Brazil) Derley	Marítimo	16
3	(Brazil) Rafael Martins	Vitória de Setúbal	15
4	(Brazil) Lima	Benfica	14
5	(Colombia) Fredy Montero	Sporting CP	13
6	(Venezuela) Mario Rondón	Nacional	12
7	(Spain) Rodrigo	Benfica	11
7	(Portugal) Bébé	Paços de Ferreira	11
7	(Brazil) Evandro	Estoril	11
10	(Cape Verde) Héldon	Sporting CP	10

Source: LPFP

==== Hat-tricks ====
Player	For	Against	Result	Date
(Colombia) Fredy Montero	Sporting CP	Arouca	5–1	18 August 2013
(Venezuela) Mario Rondón	Nacional	Paços de Ferreira	0–5	19 April 2014

=== Clean sheets ===
==== Player ====
Rank	Player	Club	Clean sheets
1	(Portugal) Rui Patrício	Sporting CP	15
2	(Slovenia) Jan Oblak	Benfica	14
3	(Brazil) Douglas	Vitória de Guimarães	12
4	(Brazil) Vagner	Estoril	11
4	(Portugal) Ricardo	Académica	11
6	(England) Matt Jones	Belenenses	10
6	(Brazil) Eduardo Gottardi	Nacional	10
6	(Brazil) Adriano Facchini	Gil Vicente	10
9	(Brazil) Cássio	Arouca	9
10	(Brazil) Helton	Porto	8

==== Club ====
- Most clean sheets: 17
  - Benfica
- Fewest clean sheets: 4
  - Paços de Ferreira
  - Olhanense

=== Discipline ===
==== Player ====
- Most yellow cards: 13
  - Nuno Coelho (Arouca)
- Most red cards: 2
  - Deyverson (Belenenses)

==== Club ====
- Most yellow cards: 109
  - Rio Ave
- Most red cards: 7
  - Marítimo
  - Estoril Praia

== Television ==
This was the first season that Sport TV did not broadcast any Benfica home matches. The club decided not to renew with rightsholders Olivedesportos and instead broadcast their home matches on their own channel, Benfica TV.

RTP Internacional and RTP África broadcast one match per week, via satellite.

== Awards ==
=== Monthly awards ===
==== SJPF Player of the Month ====
Month	Player	Club
August/September	(Colombia) Fredy Montero	Sporting CP
October/November	(Portugal) William Carvalho	Sporting CP
December	(Portugal) William Carvalho	Sporting CP
January/February	(Serbia) Lazar Marković	Benfica
March	(Portugal) William Carvalho	Sporting CP
April	(Brazil) Lima	Benfica

==== SJPF Young Player of the Month ====
Month	Player	Club
August/September	(Portugal) William Carvalho	Sporting CP
October/November	(Portugal) William Carvalho	Sporting CP
December	(Portugal) Paulo Oliveira	Vitória de Guimarães
January/February	(Portugal) João Mário	Vitória de Setúbal
March	(Portugal) William Carvalho	Sporting CP
April	(Portugal) William Carvalho	Sporting CP

== Attendances ==
#	Club	Average	Highest
1	Benfica	43,613	63,982
2	Sporting	33,703	46,109
3	Porto	28,685	48,108
4	Vitória SC	11,194	20,576
5	Braga	10,484	18,360
6	Académica	4,541	14,194
7	Os Belenenses	4,047	10,118
8	Gil Vicente	4,027	9,052
9	Arouca	3,660	28,200
10	Marítimo	3,550	7,075
11	Paços de Ferreira	3,248	6,218
12	Vitória FC	3,077	11,136
13	Estoril	2,775	5,020
14	Rio Ave	2,333	6,023
15	Olhanense	2,315	10,148
16	CD Nacional	2,212	5,142
