= Pedro Queirós =

Portuguese footballer

Personal information
- Full name: Pedro Miguel Barbosa Queirós
- Date of birth: 8 August 1984 (age 42)
- Place of birth: Santo Tirso, Portugal
- Height: 1.82 m (6 ft 0 in)
- Position: Right back

Team information
- Current team: Tirsense

Youth career
- 1997–2000: ARC Areias
- 2000–2003: Tirsense

Senior career*
Years	Team	Apps	(Gls)
2003–2005	Tirsense		
2005–2006	Braga B	22	(0)
2006–2008	Torre de Moncorvo		
2008–2009	Gloria Bistriţa	1	(0)
2009–2011	Paços Ferreira	4	(0)
2009–2010	→ Oliveirense (loan)	27	(0)
2011–2012	Feirense	28	(1)
2012–2015	Vitória Setúbal	87	(0)
2015–2016	Astra Giurgiu	32	(0)
2016–2018	Chaves	17	(0)
2018–2019	Estoril	16	(1)
2019–	Tirsense	41	(1)
- * Club domestic league appearances and goals as of 10:30, 3 May 2021 (UTC)

Pedro Miguel Barbosa Queirós (born 8 August 1984) is a Portuguese professional footballer who plays for F.C. Tirsense as a right back.

== Club career ==
Born in Santo Tirso, Porto District, Queirós played lower league or amateur football until the age of 24, when he signed for Romanian club AF Gloria Bistrița in summer 2008. He returned to his country in the following transfer window, joining F.C. Paços de Ferreira but being rarely played during his spell, which also included a loan to U.D. Oliveirense from the Segunda Liga.

Queirós returned to the Primeira Liga in the 2011–12 season, being first choice for C.D. Feirense but suffering relegation as second from last. He scored his first and only goal in the competition on 29 April 2012, in a 4–0 away win against U.D. Leiria who only fielded eight players in protest of their economic situation.

Queirós was also a starter in the next three top-flight campaigns, with Vitória de Setúbal where he was also team captain. In July 2015 the 30-year-old returned to Romania and its Liga I, signing with FC Astra Giurgiu and winning his first major trophy in his only season.

Queirós alternated between the Portuguese top division and the second tier in the following three years, with G.D. Chaves and G.D. Estoril Praia. On 10 July 2019 he returned to former side Tirsense, who now competed in the Porto regional leagues.

== Honours ==
Astra Giurgiu

- Liga I: 2015–16
