= 2014–15 F.C. Arouca season =

Arouca
2014–15 season
- President: Carlos Pinho
- Manager: Pedro Emanuel
- Stadium: Estádio Municipal de Arouca
- Primeira Liga: 16th
- Taça de Portugal: Third round
- Taça da Liga: Third round
- Top goalscorer: League: Roberto (6); All: Roberto (6)
- Highest home attendance: 6,960 vs Benfica (8 March 2015)
- Lowest home attendance: 252 vs Nacional (21 January 2015)
Home colours

The 2014–15 Arouca season was the club's 62nd competitive season, 2nd in the Primeira Liga, and 63rd year in existence as a football club.

Along with the club's participation in the Primeira Liga, the club also competed in the Taça de Portugal and Taça da Liga. The club finished 16th in the Primeira Liga, finishing five points above the relegation zone. In the Taça de Portugal, the club were eliminated in the third round by Vitória de Setúbal. Like in the Taça de Portugal, the Arouquenses were eliminated in the third round of the Taça da Liga. Arouca finished third in a group consisting of Benfica, Moreirense and Nacional.

== Club ==
=== Coaching staff ===
Position	Staff
Manager	(Portugal) Pedro Emanuel
Assistant Manager	(Portugal) Jorge Leitão
Goalkeeper Coach	(Portugal) Luís Miguel
Fitness Coach	(Portugal) João Brandão
Physio	(Portugal) André Barbosa
Scout	(Portugal) Virgílio Fernandes

=== Other information ===
President	(Portugal) Carlos Pinho
Ground (capacity and dimensions)	Estádio Municipal de Arouca (5,600 / 106 × 65 metres)
Training Ground	Estádio Municipal de Arouca

== First-team squad ==
Stats as of the end of the 2014–15 season. Games played and goals scored only refers to appearances and goals in domestic league campaigns.

No.	Name	Nationality	Position(s)	Since	Date of birth (age)	Signed from	Games	Goals
Goalkeepers
1	Mauro Goicoechea	(Uruguay)	GK	2014	27 March 1988 (aged 27)	(Romania) Oțelul Galați	33	0
13	Rui Sacramento	(Portugal)	GK	2013	31 January 1985 (aged 30)	(Portugal) Leixões	3	0
99	Igor Rocha	(Portugal)	GK	2012	March 4, 1993 (aged 22)	(Portugal) Nacional	2	0
Defenders
2	Iván Balliu	(Spain)	RB	2013	1 January 1992 (aged 23)	(Spain) Barcelona B	58	0
3	Hugo Basto	(Portugal)	CB	2015	14 May 1993 (aged 22)	(Portugal) Braga B	12	1
4	Miguel Oliveira	(Portugal)	CB	2012	18 August 1983 (aged 31)	(Portugal) Moreirense	63	3
5	Ustaritz Aldekoaotalora	(Spain)	CB	2013	16 February 1983 (aged 32)	(Georgia (country)) Dinamo Tbilisi	2	0
14	Diego Galo	(Brazil)	CB	2013	14 January 1984 (aged 31)	(Portugal) Oliveirense	61	1
16	Tomás Dabó	(Guinea-Bissau)	RB	2014	20 October 1993 (aged 21)	(Portugal) Braga	6	0
22	Luís Tinoco	(Portugal)	LB	2013	17 October 1986 (aged 28)	(Portugal) Naval	40	0
55	Nelsinho	(Brazil)	LB	2014	1 January 1988 (aged 27)	(Portugal) Portimonense	25	0
Midfielders
6	David Simão	(Portugal)	CM / LM	2013	15 May 1990 (aged 25)	(Portugal) Benfica	61	7
7	Artur	(Portugal)	AM / RM	2014	18 February 1984 (aged 31)	(Ukraine) Chornomorets Odesa	28	0
9	Bruno Amaro	(Portugal)	CM	2013	17 February 1983 (aged 32)	(Portugal) Vitória de Setúbal	44	3
10	Pintassilgo	(Portugal)	AM / CM / RM	2013	30 June 1985 (aged 29)	(Portugal) Moreirense	56	4
23	Hugo Monteiro	(Portugal)	LM / RM	2010	9 May 1985 (aged 30)	(Portugal) Gondomar	63	4
25	Fabrice Fokobo	(Cameroon)	CB / DM	2015	25 January 1994 (aged 21)	(Portugal) Sporting CP	6	0
30	Nildo Petrolina	(Brazil)	LM / RM	2014	1 May 1986 (aged 29)	(Hungary) Videoton	13	2
35	Rui Sampaio	(Portugal)	CM / DM	2014	29 May 1987 (aged 27)	(Italy) Cagliari	40	3
66	Nuno Coelho	(Portugal)	CM	2013	23 November 1987 (aged 27)	(Portugal) Benfica	55	1
Defenders
9	André Claro	(Portugal)	CF / LW	2012	31 March 1991 (aged 24)	(Portugal) Famalicão	81	8
11	Lucas Colitto	(Argentina)	LW	2014	1 June 1994 (aged 20)	(Argentina) Defensores de Belgrano	6	0
17	Ulysse Diallo	(Mali)	CF	2014	26 October 1992 (aged 22)	(Hungary) Ferencvárosi	4	1
21	Tucka	(Portugal)	CF	2014	15 February 1996 (aged 19)	(Portugal) Youth System	1	0
28	Joris Kayembe	(Belgium)	LW / RW	2015	8 August 1994 (aged 20)	(Portugal) Porto	15	1
45	Iuri Medeiros	(Portugal)	LW / RW	2015	10 July 1994 (aged 20)	(Portugal) Sporting CP	17	3
71	Roberto	(Portugal)	CF	2014	28 November 1988 (aged 26)	(Russia) Tosno	29	6
77	Serginho	(Portugal)	AM / LW / RW	2013	21 February 1991 (aged 24)	(Portugal) Beira-Mar	26	3
91	Agustín Vuletich	(Argentina)	CF	2014	3 November 1991 (aged 23)	(Argentina) Olimpo	10	2

== Competitions ==
=== Legend ===
Win Draw Loss

=== Overall ===
Competition	Started round	Final position / round	First match	Last match
Primeira Liga		16th	18 August 2014	23 May 2015
Taça de Portugal	3rd round		19 October 2014	
Taça da Liga	2nd round	3rd round	24 September 2014	21 January 2015

=== Competition record ===
Competition	Record							
Competition	G	W	D	L	GF	GA	GD	Win %
Primeira Liga	34	7	7	20	26	50	−24	20.59
Taça de Portugal	1	0	0	1	0	1	−1	0.00
Taça da Liga	5	2	1	2	3	7	−4	40.00
Total	40	9	8	23	29	58	−29	22.50

=== Primeira Liga ===
18 August 2014 Match 1	Arouca	1–1	Estoril	Arouca
21:00 CET	Pintassilgo 16'; Amaro (yellow card) 36'; Simão (yellow card) 56'	Summary	Kuca 31'; Tavares (yellow card) 53'; Amado (yellow card) 62'	Stadium: Estádio Municipal de Arouca; Attendance: 1,290; Referee: (Portugal) Marco Ferreira

23 August 2014 Match 2	Sporting CP	1–0	Arouca	Lisbon
21:30 CET	Nani (yellow card) 31'; A. Silva (yellow card) 52'; Jefferson (yellow card) 72'; Mané 90+3' (yellow card) 90+4'	Summary	Amaro (yellow card) 12'; Balliu (yellow card) 30'; Artur (yellow card) 53'; Pintassilgo (yellow card) 54'; Nelsinho (yellow card) 67'; Galo (yellow card) 89'	Stadium: Estádio José Alvalade; Attendance: 37,752; Referee: (Portugal) Nuno Miguel Serrano Almeida

31 August 2014 Match 3	Nacional	2–0	Arouca	Funchal
19:00 CET	Rondón 19' (pen.); Matias (yellow card) 56'; Suk 59'; Fofana (yellow card) 71'; Correia (yellow card) 85'	Summary	Galo (yellow card) 12'; Diallo (yellow card) 50'; Oliveira (yellow card) 78'	Stadium: Estádio da Madeira; Attendance: 11,000; Referee: (Portugal) Tiago Martins

13 September 2014 Match 4	Arouca	1–0	Braga	Arouca
19:00 CET	Claro 5'; Roberto (yellow card) 90+4'; Goicoechea (yellow card) 90+5'	Summary	Santos	Stadium: Estádio Municipal de Arouca; Attendance: 1,800; Referee: (Portugal) Pedro Proença
