= 2016–17 Sporting CP season =

Sporting CP
2016–17 season
- President: Bruno de Carvalho
- Manager: Jorge Jesus
- Stadium: Estádio José Alvalade
- Primeira Liga: 3rd
- Taça de Portugal: Quarter-finals
- Taça da Liga: Third round
- UEFA Champions League: Group stage
- Top goalscorer: League: Bas Dost (34); All: Bas Dost (36)
- Highest home attendance: 50,046 vs Real Madrid (22 November 2016, Champions League)
- Lowest home attendance: 10,698 vs Arouca (30 November 2016, Taça da Liga)
- Average home league attendance: 43,148
Home colours	Away colours	Third colours

This article shows Sporting Clube de Portugal's player statistics and all matches that the club played during the 2016–17 season.

== Pre-season and friendlies ==
Win Draw Loss

13 July 2016 Friendly	Monaco (France)	4–1	(Portugal) Sporting CP	Lausanne, Switzerland
20:30 CEST (UTC+02:00)	Germain 12'; Falcao 23', 66'; Carrillo 82'		Podence 21'	Stadium: Stade Juan Antonio Samaranch; Referee: Sébastien Pache (Switzerland)

14 July 2016 Friendly	Stade Nyonnais (Switzerland)	1–3	(Portugal) Sporting CP	Nyon, Switzerland
19:00 CEST (UTC+02:00)	Salihaj 47'		A. Ruiz 12' (pen.); J. Pereira 27'; Jefferson 37'	Stadium: Centre sportif de Colovray Nyon

16 July 2016 Friendly	Zenit Saint Petersburg (Russia)	4–2	(Portugal) Sporting CP	Montreux, Switzerland
19:00 CEST (UTC+02:00)	García 8'; Zhirkov 16'; A. Kerzhakov 17'; Đorđević 85'		Bruno César 9'; Martins 37'	Stadium: Stade de Chailly

18 July 2016 Friendly	PSV (Netherlands)	5–0	(Portugal) Sporting CP	Lausanne, Switzerland
20:30 CEST (UTC+02:00)	De Jong 5' (pen.), 55'; Locadia 21'; Hendrix 41'; Maher 50'			Stadium: Stade Juan Antonio Samaranch; Referee: Sascha Amhof (Switzerland)

23 July 2016 Presentation	Sporting CP (Portugal)	0–1	(France) Lyon	Lisbon, Portugal
20:00 WEST (UTC+01:00)			Lacazette 53'	Stadium: Estádio José Alvalade; Referee: Hugo Miguel (Portugal)

26 July 2016 Trofeo Ibérico	Villarreal (Spain)	0–0 (4–3 p)	(Portugal) Sporting CP	Badajoz, Spain
20:15 CEST (UTC+02:00)				Stadium: Nuevo Vivero; Referee: Francisco José Hernández Maeso (Spain)
	Penalties
	Costa (penalty scored); Guerra (penalty missed); González (penalty scored); Cantalapiedra (penalty scored); Suárez (penalty missed)		(penalty missed) Slimani; (penalty scored) Bruno César; (penalty scored) Medeiros; (penalty scored) M. Pereira; (penalty missed) Semedo

30 July 2016 Troféu Cinco Violinos	Sporting CP (Portugal)	2–1	(Germany) VfL Wolfsburg	Lisbon, Portugal
20:00 WEST (UTC+01:00)	Slimani 26'; A. Silva 34' (pen.)		Donkor 78'	Stadium: Estádio José Alvalade; Referee: Rui Rodrigues (Portugal)

4 August 2016 Ibérica Cup	Sporting CP (Portugal)	2–3	(Spain) Real Betis	Faro/Loulé, Portugal
20:00 WEST (UTC+01:00)	A. Ruiz 17'; Slimani 75'		Castro 27', 29', 58'	Stadium: Estádio Algarve; Referee: Nuno Almeida (Portugal)

5 August 2016 Algarve Summer Cup	Sporting CP (Portugal)	0–0	(France) Nice	Faro/Loulé, Portugal
20:30 WEST (UTC+01:00)				Stadium: Estádio Algarve; Referee: Luís Godinho (Portugal)

== Competitions ==
=== Overall record ===
As of match played on 13 May 2017

Performance by competition
Competition	Starting round	Current position/round	Final position/round	First match	Last match
Primeira Liga	—N/a	3rd	3rd	12 August 2016	21 May 2017
Taça de Portugal	Third round	—	Quarter-finals	13 October 2016	17 January 2017
Taça da Liga	Third round	—	Third round (2nd)	30 November 2016	4 January 2017
UEFA Champions League	Group stage	—	Group stage (4th)	14 September 2016	7 December 2016

Statistics by competition
Competition	Pld	W	D	L	GF	GA	GD	Win%
Primeira Liga	34	21	7	6	68	36	+32	61.76
Taça de Portugal	4	3	0	1	7	2	+5	75.00
Taça da Liga	3	2	0	1	3	2	+1	66.67
UEFA Champions League	6	1	0	5	5	8	−3	16.67
Total	47	27	7	13	83	48	+35	57.45

=== Primeira Liga ===
==== League table ====
Pos	Team	Pld	W	D	L	GF	GA	GD	Pts	Qualification or relegation
1	Benfica (C)	34	25	7	2	72	18	+54	82	Qualification for the Champions League group stage
2	Porto	34	22	10	2	71	19	+52	76	Qualification for the Champions League group stage
3	Sporting CP	34	21	7	6	68	36	+32	70	Qualification for the Champions League play-off round
4	Vitória de Guimarães	34	18	8	8	50	39	+11	62	Qualification for the Europa League group stage (Note: Since Benfica won the 2016–17 Taça de Portugal, the spot awarded to the cup winner (Europa League group stage) was passed to the fourth-placed team and the spot originally meant for the fourth-placed team (Europa League third qualifying round) was given to the sixth-placed team.)
5	Braga	34	15	9	10	51	36	+15	54	Qualification for the Europa League third qualifying round

Source: Liga Portugal
Rules for classification: 1) Points; 2) Head-to-head points; 3) Head-to-head goal difference; 4) Head-to-head away goals scored; 5) Goal difference; 6) Matches won; 7) Goals scored; 8) Play-off.
(Note: The LPFP decided that only criteria 1, 5, 6 and 7 would be applied to establish the classification during the competition.)
(C) Champions

==== Results by round ====
Round	1	2	3	4	5	6	7	8	9	10	11	12	13	14	15	16	17	18	19	20	21	22	23	24	25	26	27	28	29	30	31	32	33	34
Ground	H	A	H	H	A	H	A	H	A	H	A	H	A	H	A	H	A	A	H	A	A	H	A	H	A	H	A	H	A	H	A	H	A	H
Result	W	W	W	W	L	W	D	D	D	W	W	W	L	L	W	W	D	D	W	L	W	W	W	D	W	W	W	W	W	D	W	L	L	W
Position	5	2	1	1	2	2	3	3	4	3	2	2	3	4	4	4	4	4	3	3	3	3	3	3	3	3	3	3	3	3	3	3	3	3

Updated to match(es) played on 21 January 2017. Source:
A = Away; H = Home; W = Win; D = Draw; L = Loss

==== Matches ====
13 August 2016 1	Sporting CP	2–0	Marítimo	Lisbon
18:15 WEST (UTC+01:00)	Coates 21'; B. Ruiz 60'; A. Ruiz (yellow card) 75'	Report	Nepomuceno (yellow card) 33'; Patrick (yellow card) 51'	Stadium: Estádio José Alvalade; Attendance: 42,577; Referee: Carlos Xistra

20 August 2016 2	Paços de Ferreira	0–1	Sporting CP	Paços de Ferreira
18:15 WEST (UTC+01:00)	Welthon (yellow card) 90+2'	Report	Carvalho (yellow card) 35'; A. Silva 45'; Zeegelaar (yellow card) 77'	Stadium: Estádio Capital do Móvel; Attendance: 6,271; Referee: Hugo Miguel

28 August 2016 3	Sporting CP	2–1	Porto	Lisbon
18:00 WEST (UTC+01:00)	Slimani 15'; Martins 27', (yellow card) 27'; A. Silva (yellow card) 42'; Carvalho (yellow card) 60'; Bruno Paulista (yellow card) 77'; Bruno César (yellow card) 83'; J. Pereira (yellow card) 90+3'	Report	Felipe 8'; Casillas (yellow card) 27'; Corona (yellow card) 39'; D. Pereira (yellow card) 42'	Stadium: Estádio José Alvalade; Attendance: 49,399; Referee: Tiago Martins

10 September 2016 4	Sporting CP	3–0	Moreirense	Lisbon
18:15 WEST (UTC+01:00)	Martins 27'; Semedo (yellow card) 30'; Campbell 52'; Dost 56'; Coates (yellow card) 86'; Campbell (yellow card) 90+1'	Report	Neto (yellow card) 20' (yellow-red card) 34'; Schons (yellow card) 37'; Jander (yellow card) 89'	Stadium: Estádio José Alvalade; Attendance: 44,393; Referee: Nuno Almeida

18 September 2016 5	Rio Ave	3–1	Sporting CP	Vila do Conde
20:15 WEST (UTC+01:00)	Tarantini 29'; Guedes 36'; Dias 43'; Pedrinho (yellow card) 87'	Report	Dost (yellow card) 54', (goal) 82'; Marković (yellow card) 90+3'	Stadium: Estádio dos Arcos; Attendance: 8,315; Referee: João Pinheiro

23 September 2016 6	Sporting CP	4–2	Estoril	Lisbon
21:00 WEST (UTC+01:00)	Dost 13', 62'; Coates 59'; André 90+1'	Report	Gomes 85', 90+3'	Stadium: Estádio José Alvalade; Attendance: 41,994; Referee: João Capela

1 October 2016 7	Vitória de Guimarães	3–3	Sporting CP	Guimarães
18:15 WEST (UTC+01:00)	Ferreira (yellow card) 28'; Soares (yellow card) 45', (goal) 89'; Marega 74' (pen.), 75'; M. Silva (yellow card) 89'	Report	Schelotto (yellow card) 16'; Marković 29'; Coates 41', (yellow card) 50'; Martins (yellow card) 62'; Elias 71'	Stadium: Estádio D. Afonso Henriques; Attendance: 23,104; Referee: Artur Soares Dias

22 October 2016 8	Sporting CP	1–1	Tondela	Lisbon
18:15 WEST (UTC+01:00)	Elias (yellow card) 6'; Bruno César (yellow card) 88'; Carvalho (yellow card) 90+2'; Campbell 90+5', (yellow card) 90+6'	Report	Monteiro (yellow card) 48'; Ramos (yellow card) 71'; Murillo 73'	Stadium: Estádio José Alvalade; Attendance: 43,580; Referee: Rui Costa

28 October 2016 9	Nacional	0–0	Sporting CP	Funchal, Madeira
21:00 WEST (UTC+01:00)	Correia (yellow card) 8'; Silva (yellow card) 89'	Report	Coates (yellow card) 26'	Stadium: Estádio da Madeira; Attendance: 3,954; Referee: Vasco Santos

6 November 2016 10	Sporting CP	3–0	Arouca	Lisbon
20:15 WET (UTC±00:00)	Dost 9', 68'; Martins (yellow card) 15'; A. Silva (yellow card) 44'; Campbell (yellow card) 53', (goal) 55'	Report	Adilson (yellow card) 27'; Vítor (yellow card) 45' (yellow-red card) 50'	Stadium: Estádio José Alvalade; Attendance: 40,743; Referee: Carlos Xistra

26 November 2016 11	Boavista	0–1	Sporting CP	Porto
18:15 WET (UTC±00:00)	C. Santos (yellow card) 31'; Espinho (yellow card) 33'; Schembri (yellow card) 55'	Report	Dost 25', (yellow card) 44'; Bruno César (yellow card) 28'; Semedo (yellow card) 56' (yellow-red card) 80'; Zeegelaar (yellow card) 90+1'; B. Ruiz (yellow card) 90+2'	Stadium: Estádio do Bessa; Attendance: 9,958; Referee: Fábio Veríssimo

3 December 2016 12	Sporting CP	2–0	Vitória de Setubal	Lisbon
18:15 WET (UTC±00:00)	Carvalho 7', (yellow card) 59'; Bruno César 37'	Report	Pinto (yellow card) 23'; Agu (yellow card) 65'	Stadium: Estádio José Alvalade; Attendance: 43,467; Referee: Rui Costa

11 December 2016 13	Benfica	2–1	Sporting CP	Lisbon
18:00 WET (UTC±00:00)	Salvio 25'; Guedes (yellow card) 37'; Jiménez 48', (yellow card) 73'; Danilo (yellow card) 85'	Report	Bruno César (yellow card) 25'; Dost 69'; Zeegelaar (yellow card) 81'; Coates (yellow card) 82'	Stadium: Estádio da Luz; Attendance: 63,312; Referee: Jorge Sousa

18 December 2016 14	Sporting CP	0–1	Braga	Lisbon
20:15 WET (UTC±00:00)	J. Pereira (yellow card) 82'	Report	Marcelo Goiano (yellow card) 41'; Eduardo 70'; Fonte (yellow card) 80'; Matheus (yellow card) 87'	Stadium: Estádio José Alvalade; Attendance: 42,148; Referee: Hugo Miguel

22 December 2016 15	Belenenses	0–1	Sporting CP	Lisbon
21:00 WET (UTC±00:00)	Gomes (yellow card) 15'; G. Silva (yellow card) 65'; Sturgeon (yellow card) 74'; Gerso (yellow card) 80'; Camará (yellow card) 90+2'	Report	Esgaio (yellow card) 42'; Dost (yellow card) 50', (goal) 90+3'; A. Silva (yellow card) 55'	Stadium: Estádio do Restelo; Attendance: 8,268; Referee: Tiago Martins

8 January 2017 16	Sporting CP	2–1	Feirense	Lisbon
20:15 WET (UTC±00:00)	Dost 5', 16'; Elias (yellow card) 57' (yellow-red card) 90+2'; Esgaio (yellow card) 78'	Report	Aurélio (yellow card) 31'; Platiny 61', (yellow card) 81'	Stadium: Estádio José Alvalade; Attendance: 40,027; Referee: Bruno Esteves

14 January 2017 17	Chaves	2–2	Sporting CP	Chaves
18:15 WET (UTC±00:00)	R. Lopes 4'; Martins (yellow card) 34', (goal) 87'	Report	Semedo (yellow card) 33' (yellow-red card) 73'; Dost 45', 74'	Stadium: Estádio Municipal Eng. Manuel Branco Teixeira; Attendance: 6,964; Referee: Nuno Almeida

21 January 2017 18	Marítimo	2–2	Sporting CP	Funchal, Madeira
18:15 WET (UTC±00:00)	Bessa 8'; R. Silva 33'	Report	Dost 24'; Coates (yellow card) 57'; Martins 60'; A. Silva (yellow card) 80'	Stadium: Estádio do Marítimo; Attendance: 10,036; Referee: João Pinheiro

28 January 2017 19	Sporting CP	4–2	Paços de Ferreira	Lisbon
20:30 WET (UTC±00:00)	A. Silva 12'; Dost 32', 78'; Martins 35'; Carvalho (yellow card) 45'; A. Ruiz (yellow card) 60'; Palhinha (yellow card) 65'		Monteiro (yellow card) 11'; Christian (yellow card) 34'; Baixinho (yellow card) 45+1'; Welthon 50', 76'	Stadium: Estádio José Alvalade; Referee: Fábio Veríssimo

4 February 2017 20	Porto	2–1	Sporting CP	Porto
20:30 WET (UTC±00:00)	Soares 6', 40'; Corona (yellow card) 39'; M. Pereira (yellow card) 51'; Jota (yellow card) 78'; Felipe (yellow card) 85'	Report	Zeegelaar (yellow card) 29'; A. Ruiz 60', (yellow card) 85'; Coates (yellow card) 87'	Stadium: Estádio do Dragão; Attendance: 48,329; Referee: Hugo Miguel

12 February 2017 21	Moreirense	2–3	Sporting CP	Moreira de Cónegos
18:00 WET (UTC±00:00)	Micael (yellow card) 15'; Dramé 17', (yellow card) 81'; Cauê 43'; Sagna (yellow card) 47'	Report	A. Ruiz 40'; Patrício (yellow card) 42'; Dost 68'; A. Silva 73'; Schelotto (yellow card) 90+2'	Stadium: Parque de Jogos Comendador Joaquim de Almeida Freitas; Referee: Manuel Oliveira

18 February 2017 22	Sporting CP	1–0	Rio Ave	Lisbon
20:30 WET (UTC±00:00)	A. Ruiz 20', (yellow card) 58'; Carvalho (yellow card) 44'; A. Silva (yellow card) 44'; Martins (yellow card) 90+2'	Report	Rafa (yellow card) 26'; Tarantini (yellow card) 60'; Monte (yellow card) 73'	Stadium: Estádio José Alvalade; Attendance: 40,053; Referee: Bruno Esteves

25 February 2017 23	Estoril	0–2	Sporting CP	Estoril
20:30 WET (UTC±00:00)	Diakhite (yellow card) 85'	Report	B. Ruiz 22'; Dost 86' (pen.)	Stadium: Estádio António Coimbra da Mota; Attendance: 5,266; Referee: Rui Costa

5 March 2017 24	Sporting CP	1–1	Vitória de Guimarães	Lisbon
20:15 WET (UTC±00:00)	Bruno César (yellow card) 23'; A. Ruiz (yellow card) 33', (goal) 35'	Report	Zungu (yellow card) 24'; Raphinha (yellow card) 65'; Marega 75'; Rafael (yellow card) 90+3'	Stadium: Estádio José Alvalade; Attendance: 41,822; Referee: Jorge Sousa

11 March 2017 25	Tondela	1–4	Sporting CP	Tondela
20:30 WET (UTC±00:00)	Osorio (yellow card) 13'; Murillo 52', (yellow card) 69'; Gonçalves (yellow card) 90'	Report	Dost 32', 55', 71' (pen.), 77' (pen.); Oliveira (yellow card) 73'; Campbell (yellow card) 88'	Stadium: Estádio João Cardoso; Attendance: 4,987; Referee: Bruno Paixão

18 March 2017 26	Sporting CP	2–0	Nacional	Lisbon
18:15 WET (UTC±00:00)	Dost 13', 33'; Semedo (yellow card) 29'; Schelotto (yellow card) 44'	Report	Mezga (yellow card) 30'; César (yellow card) 55'; García (yellow card) 60'	Stadium: Estádio José Alvalade; Attendance: 43,167; Referee: Jorge Ferreira

2 April 2017 27	Arouca	1–2	Sporting CP	Arouca
18:00 WEST (UTC+01:00)	Mateus 9'; Vítor (yellow card) 25'; Adilson (yellow card) 45'; Anderson Luís (yellow card) 80'	Report	A. Ruiz (yellow card) 23', (goal) 34'; Bruno César 36'; Podence (yellow card) 80'; Carvalho (yellow card) 88'; Patrício (yellow card) 90+3'	Stadium: Estádio Municipal de Arouca; Attendance: 1,875; Referee: Luís Godinho

9 April 2017 28	Sporting CP	4–0	Boavista	Lisbon
20:30 WEST (UTC+01:00)	A. Ruiz 20'; Dost 29', 48' (pen.), 63'	Report	Machado (yellow card) 16'; Rochinha (yellow card) 73'	Stadium: Estádio José Alvalade; Attendance: 42,822; Referee: Manuel Mota

14 April 2017 29	Vitória de Setúbal	0–3	Sporting CP	Setúbal
20:30 WEST (UTC+01:00)	Pinto (yellow card) 22'; Fernandes (yellow card) 28'; Costinha (yellow card) 72'	Report	Martins 20'; Schelotto (yellow card) 30'; Zeegelaar (yellow card) 31'; A. Ruiz (yellow card) 51'; Carvalho 55'; Dost 61'	Stadium: Estádio do Bonfim; Attendance: 9,038; Referee: João Pinheiro

23 April 2017 30	Sporting CP	1–1	Benfica	Lisbon
18:00 WEST (UTC+01:00)	A. Silva 5' (pen.); A. Ruiz (yellow card) 64'	Report	Lindelöf 66'; Mitroglou (yellow card) 76'; Jiménez (yellow card) 81'; Luisão (yellow card) 90+2'	Stadium: Estádio José Alvalade; Attendance: 48,765; Referee: Artur Soares Dias

30 April 2017 31	Braga	2–3	Sporting CP	Braga
18:00 WEST (UTC+01:00)	Horta 13'; Baiano (yellow card) 23'; Rosić (yellow card) 30'; Marcelo Goiano (yellow card) 49'; Santos (yellow card) 61'; Fonte 79'	Report	Dost 50' (pen.), 75', 84', (yellow card) 62'; Podence (yellow card) 55'; Zeegelaar (yellow card) 70'; Martins (yellow card) 80'; Carvalho (yellow card) 89'; Oliveira (yellow card) 90+1'	Stadium: Estádio Municipal de Braga; Attendance: 14,907; Referee: Nuno Almeida

7 May 2017 32	Sporting CP	1–3	Belenenses	Lisbon
11:45 WEST (UTC+01:00)	Bruno César 52'	Report	Camará 65' (pen.); Almeida 84'; Silva 88'	Stadium: Estádio José Alvalade; Attendance: 45,864; Referee: Bruno Paixão

14 May 2017 33	Feirense	2–1	Sporting CP	Santa Maria da Feira
20:30 WEST (UTC+01:00)	Silva 25', 69' (pen.), (yellow card) 71'; Vítor Bruno (yellow card) 76'	Report	Martins 19', (yellow card) 55'; Carvalho (yellow card) 53'; Semedo (yellow card) 68'; Bruno César (yellow card) 71'; Jefferson (yellow card) 76'	Stadium: Estádio Marcolino de Castro; Attendance: 3,458; Referee: Vasco Santos

21 May 2017 34	Sporting CP	4–1	Chaves	Lisbon
20:15 WEST (UTC+01:00)	Dost 10' (pen.), 15', 90+1' (pen.); M. Pereira 30', (yellow card) 56'; A. Silva (yellow card) 38'; Coates (yellow card) 80'; Geraldes (yellow card) 81'	Report	William 60', (yellow card) 78'; Tiago (red card) 78'; Patrão (yellow card) 85'; Massaia (yellow card) 90'	Stadium: Estádio José Alvalade; Attendance: 32,457; Referee: Jorge Ferreira

=== Taça de Portugal ===
==== Third round ====
13 October 2016	Famalicão	0–1	Sporting CP	Vila Nova de Famalicão
20:15 WEST (UTC+01:00)			Marković 10'	Stadium: Estádio Municipal 22 de Junho; Attendance: 3,109; Referee: Manuel Mota

==== Fourth round ====
17 November 2016	Sporting CP	5–1	Praiense	Lisbon
20:15 WET (UTC±00:00)	Oliveira 21'; A. Silva 47' (pen.); Bruno César 62'; André 79', 88'		Andrade 2'	Stadium: Estádio José Alvalade; Attendance: 13,895; Referee: Luís Ferreira

==== Fifth round ====
14 December 2016	Vitória de Setúbal	0–1	Sporting CP	Setúbal
21:00 WET (UTC±00:00)			Dost 75'	Stadium: Estádio do Bonfim; Attendance: 4,993; Referee: Nuno Almeida

==== Quarter-finals ====
17 January 2017	Chaves	1–0	Sporting CP	Chaves
20:15 WET (UTC±00:00)	Ponck 87'			Stadium: Estádio Municipal Eng. Manuel Branco Teixeira; Attendance: 5,320; Referee: Artur Soares Dias

=== Taça da Liga ===
==== Third round ====
Pos	Team	Pld	W	D	L	GF	GA	GD	Pts	Qualification	VSE	SCP	ARO	VAR
1	Vitória de Setúbal	3	2	0	1	3	2	+1	6	Advance to knockout phase	—	2–1	1–0	—
2	Sporting CP	3	2	0	1	3	2	+1	6		—	—	1–0	1–0
3	Arouca	3	1	0	2	3	2	+1	3		—	—	—	3–0
4	Varzim	3	1	0	2	1	4	−3	3		1–0	—	—	—

Source: LPFP
Rules for classification: Tiebreakers

30 November 2016 1	Sporting CP	1–0	Arouca	Lisbon
18:15 WET (UTC±00:00)	A. Ruiz 44'	Report		Stadium: Estádio José Alvalade; Attendance: 10,698; Referee: Hugo Miguel

30 December 2016 2	Sporting CP	1–0	Varzim	Lisbon
21:15 WET (UTC±00:00)	Martins 19'	Report		Stadium: Estádio José Alvalade; Attendance: 24,752; Referee: Bruno Paixão

4 January 2017 3	Vitória de Setúbal	2–1	Sporting CP	Setúbal
20:15 WET (UTC±00:00)	Venâncio 19'; Edinho 90+4' (pen.)	Report	Elias 79'	Stadium: Estádio do Bonfim; Attendance: 4,231; Referee: Rui Oliveira

=== UEFA Champions League ===
==== Group stage ====
Pos	Team	Pld	W	D	L	GF	GA	GD	Pts	Qualification	DOR	RMA	LEG	SPO
1	(Germany) Borussia Dortmund	6	4	2	0	21	9	+12	14	Advance to knockout phase	—	2–2	8–4	1–0
2	(Spain) Real Madrid	6	3	3	0	16	10	+6	12	Advance to knockout phase	2–2	—	5–1	2–1
3	(Poland) Legia Warsaw	6	1	1	4	9	24	−15	4	Transfer to Europa League	0–6	3–3	—	1–0
4	(Portugal) Sporting CP	6	1	0	5	5	8	−3	3		1–2	1–2	2–0	—

Source: UEFA
Rules for classification: Group stage tiebreakers

14 September 2016 1	Real Madrid (Spain)	2–1	(Portugal) Sporting CP	Madrid, Spain
20:45 CEST (UTC+02:00)	Kroos (yellow card) 75'; Ronaldo 89'; Morata 90+4'	Report	A. Silva (yellow card) 39'; Bruno César 48'; Carvalho (yellow card) 57'; Zeegelaar (yellow card) 65'	Stadium: Santiago Bernabéu; Attendance: 72,179; Referee: Paolo Tagliavento (Italy)

27 September 2016 2	Sporting CP (Portugal)	2–0	(Poland) Legia Warsaw	Lisbon, Portugal
20:45 CEST (UTC+02:00)	B. Ruiz 28'; Dost 37'	Report	Guilherme (yellow card) 39'; Bereszyński (yellow card) 86'; Rzeźniczak (yellow card) 87'	Stadium: Estádio José Alvalade; Attendance: 40,094; Referee: Michael Oliver (England)

18 October 2016 3	Sporting CP (Portugal)	1–2	(Germany) Borussia Dortmund	Lisbon, Portugal
20:45 CEST (UTC+02:00)	Elias (yellow card) 54'; Bruno César 67', (yellow card) 86'; Schelotto (yellow card) 68'; Campbell (yellow card) 76'	Report	Aubameyang 9'; Weigl 43'; Passlack (yellow card) 49'; Rode (yellow card) 76'; Bürki (yellow card) 88'	Stadium: Estádio José Alvalade; Attendance: 46,609; Referee: Damir Skomina (Slovenia)

2 November 2016 4	Borussia Dortmund (Germany)	1–0	(Portugal) Sporting CP	Dortmund, Germany
20:45 CET (UTC+01:00)	Ramos 12'; Guerreiro (yellow card) 65'	Report	Semedo (yellow card) 11'; Castaignos (yellow card) 21'; Zeegelaar (yellow card) 75'	Stadium: Westfalenstadion; Attendance: 65,849; Referee: Danny Makkelie (Netherlands)

22 November 2016 5	Sporting CP (Portugal)	1–2	(Spain) Real Madrid	Lisbon, Portugal
20:45 CET (UTC+01:00)	B. Ruiz (yellow card) 57'; J. Pereira (red card) 64'; A. Silva 80' (pen.); Campbell (yellow card) 90'; André (yellow card) 90+2'	Report	Varane 29'; Marcelo (yellow card) 40'; Kovačić (yellow card) 64'; Benzema 87'	Stadium: Estádio José Alvalade; Attendance: 50,046; Referee: Willie Collum (Scotland)

7 December 2016 6	Legia Warsaw (Poland)	1–0	(Portugal) Sporting CP	Warsaw, Poland
20:45 CET (UTC+01:00)	Guilherme 30'; Kopczyński (yellow card) 36'; Rzeźniczak (yellow card) 74'; Odjidja-Ofoe (yellow card) 75'; Radović (yellow card) 79'; Pazdan (yellow card) 81'	Report	A. Silva (yellow card) 56'; Carvalho (yellow card) 81' (yellow-red card) 85'	Stadium: Polish Army Stadium; Attendance: 28,232; Referee: Gianluca Rocchi (Italy)

== Players ==
=== Squad statistics ===
As of match played 30 May 2017

No.	Pos	Nat	Player	Total		Primeira Liga		Taça de Portugal		Taça da Liga		Champions League	
No.	Pos	Nat	Player	Apps	Goals	Apps	Goals	Apps	Goals	Apps	Goals	Apps	Goals
1	GK	(Portugal)	Rui Patrício	38	0	31	0	1	0	0	0	6	0
26	GK	(Slovenia)	Ažbe Jug	0	0	0	0	0	0	0	0	0	0
34	GK	(Portugal)	Beto	9	0	3	0	3	0	3	0	0	0
2	DF	(Italy)	Ezequiel Schelotto	25	0	22+1	0	0	0	0	0	2	0
4	DF	(Brazil)	Jefferson	16	0	8+2	0	3	0	2	0	1	0
13	DF	(Uruguay)	Sebastián Coates	43	3	33	3	2	0	2	0	6	0
15	DF	(Portugal)	Paulo Oliveira	19	1	10+3	0	3	1	1	0	2	0
19	DF	(Netherlands)	Douglas	7	0	1+1	0	2	0	3	0	0	0
21	DF	(Portugal)	João Pereira	14	0	8+1	0	2	0	0	0	3	0
31	DF	(Netherlands)	Marvin Zeegelaar	26	0	18+2	0	1	0	0	0	5	0
35	DF	(Portugal)	Rúben Semedo	31	0	24	0	1	0	0	0	6	0
47	DF	(Portugal)	Ricardo Esgaio	13	0	5+3	0	2	0	3	0	0	0
8	MF	(Serbia)	Radosav Petrović	2	0	0	0	1	0	1	0	0	0
11	MF	(Brazil)	Bruno César	40	6	22+9	3	3	1	1	0	5	2
14	MF	(Portugal)	William Carvalho	42	2	31+1	2	2	0	2	0	6	0
18	MF	(Portugal)	Francisco Geraldes	14	0	0+4	0	2	0	2	0	6	0
22	MF	(Brazil)	Elias	13	2	1+7	1	2	0	2	1	1	0
23	MF	(Portugal)	Adrien Silva	35	6	26+1	4	3	1	1	0	4	1
25	MF	(Argentina)	Marcelo Meli	0	0	0	0	0	0	0	0	0	0
30	MF	(Brazil)	Bruno Paulista	3	0	0+3	0	0	0	0	0	0	0
66	MF	(Portugal)	João Palhinha	11	0	4+7	0	0	0	0	0	0	0
3	FW	(Serbia)	Lazar Marković	11	2	2+4	1	1	1	2	0	2	0
7	FW	(Costa Rica)	Joel Campbell	23	3	7+12	3	1	0	3	0	0	0
10	FW	(Costa Rica)	Bryan Ruiz	39	3	23+9	2	1	0	1	0	5	1
16	FW	(Brazil)	André	10	3	2+5	1	2	2	1	0	0	0
20	FW	(Netherlands)	Luc Castaignos	10	0	0+6	0	1	0	2	0	1	0
28	FW	(Netherlands)	Bas Dost	39	36	30+1	34	2	1	1	0	5	1
33	FW	(Lithuania)	Lukas Spalvis	0	0	0	0	0	0	0	0	0	0
56	FW	(Portugal)	Daniel Podence	13	0	4+9	0	0	0	0	0	0	0
73	FW	(Brazil)	Matheus Pereira	8	1	5+2	1	1	0	0	0	0	0
77	FW	(Portugal)	Gelson Martins	41	7	32	6	2	0	1	1	6	0
99	FW	(Argentina)	Alan Ruiz	26	7	19+4	6	2	0	1	1	0	0

=== In ===
Note: Flags indicate national team as defined under FIFA eligibility rules; some limited exceptions apply. Players may hold more than one non-FIFA nationality.

No.	Pos.	Nation	Player
34	GK	POR	Beto (from Sevilla, free)
13	DF	URU	Sebastián Coates (from Sunderland, loan until 30 June 2017)
19	DF	NED	Douglas (from Trabzonspor, €1M)
8	MF	SRB	Radosav Petrović (from Dynamo Kyiv, €2M)
25	MF	ARG	Marcelo Meli (from Boca Juniors, loan until 30 June 2017)
–	MF	BRA	Elias (from Corinthians, €2.5M)

No.	Pos.	Nation	Player
16	FW	BRA	André (from Corinthians, undisclosed)
3	FW	SRB	Lazar Marković (from Liverpool, loan until 30 June 2017)
7	FW	CRC	Joel Campbell (from Arsenal, loan until 30 June 2017)
20	FW	NED	Luc Castaignos (from Eintracht Frankfurt, €2.5M)
99	FW	ARG	Alan Ruiz (from Colón, €5.3M)
33	FW	LTU	Lukas Spalvis (from Aalborg BK, €1.6M)
28	FW	NED	Bas Dost (from VfL Wolfsburg, €10M+€2M variables)

=== Out ===
Note: Flags indicate national team as defined under FIFA eligibility rules; some limited exceptions apply. Players may hold more than one non-FIFA nationality.

No.	Pos.	Nation	Player
17	MF	POR	João Mário (at Internazionale, €40M+€5M variables)
9	FW	ALG	Islam Slimani (at Leicester City, €30M+€5M variables)
6	MF	ITA	Alberto Aquilani (at Pescara, undisclosed)
44	DF	BRA	Naldo (at Krasnodar, €4.5M)
28	MF	POR	André Martins (at Olympiacos, free, end of contract)
10	FW	PER	André Carrillo (at Benfica, free, end of contract)
20	FW	NED	Zakaria Labyad (free, end of contract)
81	DF	POR	André Geraldes (at Vitória de Setúbal, loan until 30 June 2017)
13	DF	POR	Miguel Lopes (at Akhisar Belediyespor, loan until 30 June 2017)
5	DF	BRA	Ewerton (at 1. FC Kaiserslautern, loan until 30 June 2017)
55	DF	POR	Tobias Figueiredo (at Nacional, loan until 30 June 2017)
40	DF	GNB	Sambinha (at New England Revolution, loan until 31 December 2016)

No.	Pos.	Nation	Player
33	DF	ARG	Jonathan Silva (at Boca Juniors, loan until 30 June 2017)
27	MF	SCO	Ryan Gauld (at Vitória de Setúbal, loan until 30 June 2017)
42	MF	BRA	Wallyson (at Standard Liège, loan until 30 June 2017)
24	MF	ESP	Oriol Rosell (at Belenenses, loan until 30 June 2017)
66	MF	POR	João Palhinha (at Belenenses, loan until 30 June 2017)
25	MF	BUL	Simeon Slavchev (at Lechia Gdańsk, loan until 30 June 2017)
36	MF	POR	Carlos Mané (at VfB Stuttgart, loan until 30 June 2018)
45	MF	POR	Iuri Medeiros (at Boavista, loan until 30 June 2017)
56	MF	POR	Daniel Podence (at Moreirense, loan until 30 June 2017)
19	FW	COL	Teófilo Gutiérrez (at Rosario Central, loan until 30 June 2017)
29	FW	ARG	Hernán Barcos (at Vélez Sarsfield, loan until 30 June 2017)
19	FW	JPN	Junya Tanaka (at Kashiwa Reysol, loan until 30 June 2017)
