= 2017 Taça da Liga final =

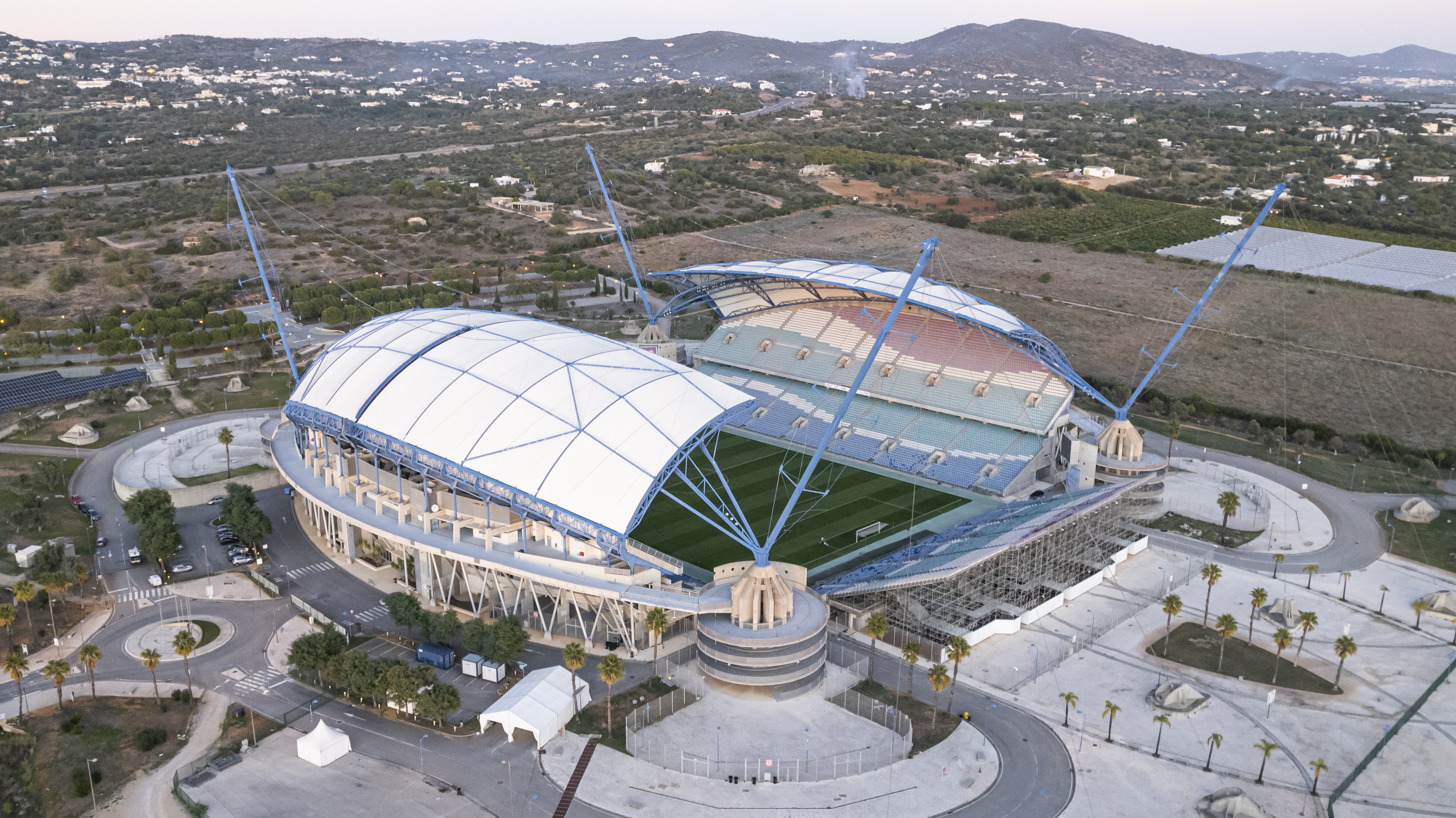
- Estádio Algarve
- Event: 2016–17 Taça da Liga
Braga	Moreirense
0	1
- Date: 29 January 2017
- Venue: Estádio Algarve, Faro/Loulé
- Man of the Match: Cauê (Moreirense)
- Referee: Artur Soares Dias (Porto)
- Attendance: 6,713

The 2017 Taça da Liga final was the final match of the 2016–17 Taça da Liga, the tenth season of the Taça da Liga. It was played on 29 January 2017 at Estádio Algarve.

The competition involved the 35 clubs playing in the top two tiers of the Portuguese football league system – 18 from Primeira Liga and 17 from Segunda Liga – during the 2016–17 season. Reserve sides of Primeira Liga teams which played in the 2016–17 Segunda Liga were excluded from the competition.

Moreirense defeated Braga 1–0 to win their first national cup in their first appearance in a national cup final.

== Background ==
On 19 June 2015, the Liga Portuguesa de Futebol Profissional ("LPFP") announced that the number of teams in the 2016–17 LigaPro season would be reduced to 22, thus reducing the number of teams that would play in the Taça da Liga from 37 to 35.

On 28 June 2016, the LPFP approved some changes in relation to the semi-finals matches. It was settled that both the semi-finals and final match were to be played in the same week and in the same stadium.

Braga made their second appearance in the Taça da Liga final after their first final in 2013, where they defeated Porto 1–0. Moreirense had their first appearance in any national competition final in the club's history. Both clubs are from Braga Football Association.

In Braga's and Moreirense's entire history, the two teams had played one another 15 times – Braga won eight matches, Moreirense won one match and the teams drew six matches. Before the final, the last meeting between both sides had been in the domestic league, on 22 December 2016, with hosts Braga defeating Moreirense 2–1.

== Route to the final ==
Note: In all results below, the score of the finalist is given first (H: home; A: away; N: neutral).

Braga			Round	Moreirense		
Opponent	Result	Stadium	First round	Opponent	Result	Stadium
Bye			First round	Bye		
Opponent	Result	Stadium	Second round	Opponent	Result	Stadium
Bye			Second round	Estoril	1–0 (H)	Parque de Jogos Almeida Freitas
Opponent	Result	Stadium	Third round	Opponent	Result	Stadium
Rio Ave	1–2 (H)	Estádio Municipal de Braga	Matchday 1	Feirense	1–2 (A)	Estádio Marcolino de Castro
Sporting da Covilhã	4–0 (H)	Estádio Municipal de Braga	Matchday 2	Belenenses	3–3 (H)	Parque de Jogos Almeida Freitas
Marítimo	0–1 (A)	Estádio do Marítimo	Matchday 3	Porto	1–0 (H)	Parque de Jogos Almeida Freitas
Group C winners: Team / Pld / W / D / L / GF / GA / GD / Pts; Braga / 3 / 2 / 0 / 1 / 6 / 2 / +4 / 6; Rio Ave / 3 / 2 / 0 / 1 / 4 / 2 / +2 / 6; Marítimo / 3 / 1 / 1 / 1 / 2 / 2 / 0 / 4; Sporting da Covilhã / 3 / 0 / 1 / 2 / 1 / 7 / −6 / 1			Final standings	Group B winners: Team / Pld / W / D / L / GF / GA / GD / Pts; Moreirense / 3 / 2 / 1 / 0 / 6 / 4 / +2 / 7; Belenenses / 3 / 0 / 3 / 0 / 5 / 5 / 0 / 3; Feirense / 3 / 0 / 2 / 1 / 4 / 5 / –1 / 2; Porto / 3 / 0 / 2 / 1 / 1 / 2 / –1 / 2		
Opponent	Result	Stadium	Knockout phase	Opponent	Result	Stadium
Vitória de Setúbal	0–3 (N)	Estádio Algarve	Semi-finals	Benfica	3–1 (N)	Estádio Algarve

=== Braga ===
Braga entered the 2016–17 Taça da Liga in the third round. The third round consisted of three group stage matches with the group winner progressing to the semi-finals. Braga were drawn in group B, alongside Primeira Liga sides Rio Ave, Marítimo and Segunda Liga's Sporting da Covilhã.

=== Moreirense ===
Moreirense entered the competition in the second round. They won a home match against Estoril 1–0, with Frédéric Maciel scoring the goal.

In the next stage, Moreirense were drawn into Group C together with Feirense, Belenenses and Porto. Moreirense's first match was away against Feirense on 1 December. Moreirense defeated the Santa Maria da Feira-based side 1–2 with goals from Ença Fati and Emmanuel Boateng, both in the first half. Moreirense's second group stage match was a home tie against Belenenses which ended 3–3. Moreirense took the lead on 34 minutes through Roberto, who then scored an own goal in the 20th minute of the second half. André Sousa and Miguel Rosa gave a 1–3 lead to Belenenses before Cauê converted a penalty. Roberto scored his second goal to seal a draw. Their third and final group stage match was a 1–0 victory against Porto on 3 January, with Francisco Geraldes scoring the only goal of the match.

In the semi-finals played on 26 January, Moreirense played Benfica. The first half saw Benfica dominate possession and score an early goal from Eduardo Salvio. In the first minute of second half, winger Ousmane Dramé scored to level the score. On the 54th minute, Boateng scored another goal for the Cónegos, assisted by Cauê. Eighteen minutes later, he scored again, this time assisted by Daniel Podence, becoming the first player to score two goals against Benfica in a Taça da Liga match. This result marked Benfica's first defeat in the competition since 31 October 2007 and put an end to a 42-match unbeaten run. This was also Moreirense's first ever win over Benfica in 20 matches.

== Pre-match ==
=== Broadcasting ===
The final was broadcast by RTP on TV (RTP1, RTP Internacional, RTP África) and Radio (Antena 1). TV coverage was shared with Sport TV.

=== Officials ===
Match officials were confirmed on 27 January, when Artur Soares Dias of Porto was named the referee for the final. Soares Dias was assisted by Rui Tavares (Porto) and Nuno Pereira (Coimbra). The fourth official was João Silva (Porto), while the additional assistant referees were Hélder Malheiro (Lisbon) and Luís Ferreira (Braga).

=== Ticketing ===
Tickets for the final four went on sale on 19 December. The LPFP allocated tickets for both finalist clubs with prices for the match varying between €5 and €15.

=== Venue ===
On 28 June 2016, the LPFP announced that both the semi-finals and final would be played at a neutral venue. On 15 July, the Estádio Algarve was selected to host the final four.

The Estádio Algarve had previously hosted the Taça da Liga final three times, in 2008, 2009 and 2010. The first one was won by Vitória de Setúbal (after a penalty shoot-out), while the last two were won by Benfica.

The Estádio Algarve holds a capacity for 30,002 spectators and was opened in 2004 ahead of UEFA Euro 2004.

== Match ==
=== Details ===
29 January 2017
20:45 WET (UTC±00:00)

Braga	0–1	Moreirense
	Report	Cauê 45+2' (pen.)

Estádio Algarve, Faro/Loulé
Attendance: 6,713
Referee: Artur Soares Dias (Porto)

Braga	Moreirense

GK	92	(Brazil) Matheus	(yellow card) 45'
RB	22	(Portugal) Paulinho
CB	44	(Portugal) Artur Jorge	(yellow card) 25'	(substituted off) 79'
CB	2	(Uruguay) Emiliano Velázquez
LB	15	(Brazil) Baiano
CM	5	(Argentina) Rodrigo Battaglia
CM	80	(Portugal) Xeka		(substituted off) 46'
RW	23	(Portugal) Pedro Santos (c)
LW	21	(Portugal) Ricardo Horta		(substituted off) 65'
CF	19	(Serbia) Nikola Stojiljković
CF	17	(Portugal) Rui Fonte	(yellow card) 90+5'
Substitutes:
GK	28	(Portugal) José Marafona
DF	3	(Serbia) Lazar Rosić
DF	82	(Belgium) Anthony D'Alberto
MF	14	(Brazil) Rafael Assis
MF	35	(Montenegro) Nikola Vukčević	(yellow card) 84'	(substituted in) 46'
FW	13	(Brazil) Rodrigo Pinho		(substituted in) 65'
FW	30	(Brazil) Alan		(substituted in) 79'
Manager:
(Portugal) Jorge Simão

GK	1	(Georgia (country)) Giorgi Makaridze	(yellow card) 63'
RB	95	(Senegal) Pierre Sagna	(yellow card) 89'
CB	3	(Portugal) André Micael (c)
CB	44	(Brazil) Diego Galo
LB	5	(Portugal) Pedro Rebocho
DM	18	(Brazil) Cauê
DM	65	(Portugal) Fernando Alexandre
CM	8	(Portugal) Francisco Geraldes	(yellow card) 28'
RW	56	(Portugal) Daniel Podence
LW	93	(France) Ousmane Dramé	(yellow card) 44'	(substituted off) 61'
CF	9	(Portugal) Roberto		(substituted off) 61'
Substitutes:
GK	99	(Portugal) Pedro Taborda
DF	6	(Brazil) Jander
DF	14	(Brazil) Diego Ivo
MF	16	(Brazil) Nildo Petrolina		(substituted in) 61'
MF	20	(Portugal) Tiago Morgado
FW	21	(Costa Rica) David Ramírez
FW	29	(Ghana) Emmanuel Boateng		(substituted in) 61'
Manager:
(Portugal) Augusto Inácio

Man of the Match:
Cauê (Moreirense)

Assistant referees:
Rui Tavares (Porto)
Nuno Pereira (Coimbra)
Fourth official:
João Silva (Porto)
Additional assistant referees:
Hélder Malheiro (Lisbon)
Luís Ferreira (Braga)

Match rules

- 90 minutes.
- Penalty shoot-out if scores still level.
- Seven named substitutes, of which up to three may be used.

== See also ==
- 2017 Taça de Portugal final
