= Igor Rocha =

Igor Rocha may refer to:

- Igor Rocha (footballer, born 1984), Portuguese football defender
- Igor Rocha (footballer, born 1993), Portuguese football goalkeeper
- Igor Rocha (footballer, born 1995), Brazilian football forward
