= Emmanuel Boateng (footballer, born 1996) =

Ghanaian footballer (born 1996)

Personal information
- Full name: Emmanuel Okyere Boateng
- Date of birth: 23 May 1996 (age 30)
- Place of birth: Accra, Ghana
- Height: 1.75 m (5 ft 9 in)
- Position: Striker

Team information
- Current team: Hapoel Tel Aviv
- Number: 9

Youth career
- 2004–2013: Charity Stars
- 2013–2014: Rio Ave

Senior career*
Years	Team	Apps	(Gls)
2014–2015	Rio Ave	13	(1)
2015–2017	Moreirense	55	(9)
2017–2019	Levante	41	(7)
2019–2022	Dalian Professional	41	(14)
2022–2024	Rio Ave	55	(13)
2024–2025	Al-Orobah	12	(2)
2025–2026	Gaziantep	25	(5)
2026–	Hapoel Tel Aviv	13	(1)

International career^{‡}
2013	Ghana U17		
2015	Ghana U20	3	(1)
2018–	Ghana	6	(1)
- * Club domestic league appearances and goals as of 29 November 2025 ‡ National team caps and goals as of 18 November 2019

Emmanuel Okyere Boateng (born 23 May 1996) is a Ghanaian footballer who plays as a striker for Israeli Premier League club Hapoel Tel Aviv and the Ghana national team.

== Club career ==
=== Rio Ave ===
Born in Accra, Boateng joined Rio Ave in 2013, after impressing on a trial, from hometown club Charity Stars FC. Initially assigned to the youth setup, he made his professional debut on 31 July 2014, coming on as a second-half substitute for Yonathan Del Valle in a 1–0 away win against IFK Göteborg for the season's UEFA Europa League.

Boateng made his Primeira Liga debut on 17 August 2014, starting in a 2–0 home win against Vitória de Setúbal. His first goal in the category occurred on 1 September, as he scored the last in a 4–0 home routing of Boavista.

=== Moreirense ===
On 7 July 2015, Boateng and his Rio Ave teammate Ernest Ohemeng made a permanent move to fellow league team Moreirense. Mainly used as a substitute during his first season, he started to feature more regularly during his second.

Boateng was also regularly used in the Taça da Liga, netting a brace in a 3–1 home success over Benfica on 26 January 2017. Three days later, he replaced Roberto in the final, a 1–0 win against S.C. Braga; it was Moreirense's first ever national title.

Boateng scored his first league double on 30 April 2017, in a 2–2 away draw against Arouca.

=== Levante ===
On 16 August 2017, Boateng signed a four-year deal with La Liga side Levante UD.

On 13 May 2018, he scored first career hat-trick against champions Barcelona. Levante won the match 5–4, ending the possibility of an unbeaten season for Barcelona.

=== Dalian Professional ===
On 20 February 2019, Boateng signed with Chinese Super League side Dalian Professional (then Dalian Yifang).

=== Return to Rio Ave ===
In 2022, Boateng left Dalian to rejoin Rio Ave.

=== Al-Orobah ===
On 12 August 2024, Boateng joined Saudi Pro League club Al-Orobah on a one-year contract.

=== Gaziantep F.K. ===
On January 13, 2025, Boateng left Al-Orobah and signed for Turkish Süper Lig club Gaziantep F.K. on a one and a half year contract.

=== Hapoel Tel Aviv F.C. ===
On February 1, 2026, Boateng left Gaziantep F.K. and signed for Israel Premier League club Hapoel Tel Aviv F.C. on a one and a half year contract.

On February 13, 2026, Boateng scored his first goal for Hapoel, in a 3–1 win against Hapoel Jerusalem.

== International career ==
He was part of the Ghana national under-20 football team, who played the 2015 FIFA U-20 World Cup in New Zealand. He scored one goal in the competition on 5 June 2015, in a 1–0 win against Panama. On 30 May 2018 he made his senior appearance for the Black Stars. He marked his debut with a goal when he scored a penalty in the 51st minute of the game.

== Career statistics ==
=== Club ===
As of match played 15 May 2026

Appearances and goals by club, season and competition
Club	Season	League			National Cup		League Cup		Continental		Other		Total	
Club	Season	Division	Apps	Goals	Apps	Goals	Apps	Goals	Apps	Goals	Apps	Goals	Apps	Goals
Rio Ave	2014–15	Primeira Liga	13	1	4	1	1	0	9	0	1 (Note: Appearances in Supertaça Cândido de Oliveira)	0	28	2
Moreirense	2015–16	Primeira Liga	27	2	3	1	1	0	—		—		31	3
Moreirense	2016–17	Primeira Liga	26	7	6	3	1	0	—		—		33	10
Moreirense	2017–18	Primeira Liga	2	0	1	0	0	0	—		—		3	0
Moreirense	Total		55	9	10	4	2	0	—		—		67	13
Levante	2017–18	La Liga	25	6	4	1	—		—		—		29	7
Levante	2018–19	La Liga	16	1	3	0	—		—		—		19	1
Levante	Total		41	7	7	1	—		—		—		48	8
Dalian Professional	2019	Chinese Super League	21	8	1	3	—		—		—		22	11
Dalian Professional	2020	Chinese Super League	7	2	1	0	—		—		—		8	2
Dalian Professional	2021	Chinese Super League	13	4	0	0	—		—		0 (Note: Appearance(s) in CSL Relegation play-offs)	0	13	4
Dalian Professional	Total		41	14	2	3	—		—		0	0	43	17
Rio Ave	2022–23	Primeira Liga	28	6	1	0	2	1	—		—		31	6
Rio Ave	2023–24	Primeira Liga	27	7	1	0	2	0	—		—		30	7
Rio Ave	Total		55	13	2	0	4	1	—		—		61	13
Al-Orobah	2024–25	Saudi Pro League	13	2	1	0	—		—		—		14	2
Gaziantep	2024–25	Süper Lig	16	4	2	0	—		—		—		18	4
Gaziantep	2025–26	Süper Lig	11	1	3	1	—		—		—		14	2
Gaziantep	Total		27	5	5	1	—		—		—		32	6
Hapoel Tel Aviv F.C.	2025–26	Israeli Premier League	13	1	—		—		—		—		13	1
Career total			258	52	30	10	7	1	9	0	1	0	305	63

=== International goals ===
Scores and results list Ghana's goal tally first.

No	Date	Venue	Opponent	Score	Result	Competition
1.	30 May 2018	International Stadium, Yokohama, Japan	Japan	2–0	2–0	Friendly

== Honours ==
Moreirense

- Taça da Liga: 2016–17
