= Tiago Morgado =

Portuguese footballer (born 1993)

Personal information
- Full name: Tiago Emanuel Jesus Morgado
- Date of birth: 28 July 1993 (age 33)
- Place of birth: Lisbon, Portugal
- Height: 1.74 m (5 ft 8 1/2 in)
- Position: Midfielder

Team information
- Current team: Belenenses
- Number: 21

Youth career
- 2001–2005: Carcavelos
- 2005–2009: Sporting CP
- 2009–2012: Real Massamá

Senior career*
Years	Team	Apps	(Gls)
2012–2016	Real Massamá	106	(14)
2016–2017	Moreirense	2	(0)
2017–2018	Real Massamá	29	(3)
2018–2019	Merelinense	29	(0)
2019–2020	Real Massamá	24	(2)
2020	Covilhã	2	(0)
2020–2021	Alverca	21	(1)
2021–2022	Real Massamá	25	(4)
2022–2023	Alverca	17	(0)
2023–2024	Atlético	32	(4)
2024–	Belenenses	58	(2)
- * Club domestic league appearances and goals as of 7 May 2026

Tiago Emanuel Jesus Morgado (born 28 July 1993) is a Portuguese professional footballer who plays for Belenenses as a midfielder.

== Club career ==
Born in Lisbon, Morgado played youth football with three local clubs, including Sporting CP from ages 12 to 16. He made his senior debut with Real SC, going on to represent them in three lower levels of Portuguese football.

In July 2016, Morgado moved straight to the Primeira Liga with Moreirense FC. He made his debut as a professional on 26 October at the age of 23, playing the full 90 minutes in a 1–0 home win against G.D. Estoril Praia in the second round of the Taça da Liga. He added a further two appearances in the competition, which was eventually won.

Morgado first appeared in the top division on 22 December 2016, coming on as a late substitute in a 2–1 away loss to S.C. Braga. In the summer of 2017 he rejoined his first club, recently promoted to the Segunda Liga.

Morgado scored his first goal as a professional on 3 September 2017, but the visitors lost 4–3 at Vitória de Guimarães B.

== Honours ==
Moreirense

- Taça da Liga: 2016–17
