= Frédéric Maciel =

Portuguese footballer (born 1994)

Personal information
- Full name: Frédéric Ferreira Maciel
- Date of birth: 15 March 1994 (age 32)
- Place of birth: Grenoble, France
- Height: 1.75 m (5 ft 9 in)
- Position: Winger

Team information
- Current team: CSKA 1948
- Number: 67

Youth career
- 2002–2005: Esposende
- 2005–2007: Varzim
- 2007–2008: Braga
- 2008–2009: Sporting CP
- 2009–2010: Padroense
- 2010–2013: Porto

Senior career*
Years	Team	Apps	(Gls)
2012–2015	Porto B	64	(14)
2015–2016	Mouscron-Péruwelz	15	(0)
2016–2018	Moreirense	11	(1)
2018–2019	Gil Vicente	16	(1)
2019–2020	Varzim	14	(0)
2020–2021	Lusitânia	25	(8)
2021–2023	Torreense	43	(5)
2023–2025	Oțelul Galați	73	(13)
2025–	CSKA 1948	40	(6)

International career
2009–2010	Portugal U16	10	(2)
2010–2011	Portugal U17	13	(1)
2011–2012	Portugal U18	10	(2)
2012–2013	Portugal U19	10	(1)
- * Club domestic league appearances and goals as of 19:49, 7 October 2026 (UTC)

Frédéric Ferreira Maciel (born 15 March 1994) is a Portuguese professional footballer who plays as a winger for First Professional Football League club CSKA 1948.

== Club career ==
Born in Grenoble, France of Portuguese descent, Maciel joined FC Porto's academy at the age of 16. He made his senior debut with the reserves, going on to spend several seasons in the Segunda Liga; in 2014–15, he scored a squad-best 13 goals in 43 games to help to a 13th-place finish.

On 13 July 2015, Maciel signed a three-year deal with Royal Mouscron-Péruwelz which was to be initially a one-year loan with option to buy. He was sparingly used during the campaign, with the side narrowly avoiding relegation from the Belgian Pro League.

Maciel returned to his country of adoption in summer 2016, agreeing to a two-year contract at Moreirense FC. His Primeira Liga debut occurred on 29 October, when he came on as a 62nd-minute substitute for Daniel Podence in a 2–1 away win against C.D. Tondela. In the final game of the season, he scored his only league goal in a 3–1 home victory over former club Porto. Though he was not involved in the final at all, he played his part in their conquest of the Taça da Liga by scoring the only goal of the second-round defeat of G.D. Estoril-Praia at the Parque de Jogos Comendador Joaquim de Almeida Freitas. On 19 November 2017, in the fourth round of the Taça de Portugal, he added two more in a 5–2 win over F.C. Felgueiras 1932 at the same venue.

On 10 January 2018, Maciel moved across the second division to Gil Vicente F.C. on a 2 1/2-year deal. He made ten starts as the team from Barcelos suffered relegation, and scored in a 2–1 loss at C.D. Santa Clara on 25 February; injury cost him the entire 2018–19, and new manager Vítor Oliveira informed him that he was not in his plans for the club now restored to the top flight.

On 2 September 2019, free agent Maciel joined Varzim S.C. on a one-year contract. He subsequently represented Lusitânia FC (third tier) and S.C.U. Torreense (second and third).

Maciel signed a one-year deal with ASC Oțelul Galați of the Romanian Liga I in July 2023. The following February, he agreed to an extension until June 2025.

On 18 June 2025, Maciel joined First Professional Football League club FC CSKA 1948 Sofia.

== Honours ==
Moreirense

- Taça da Liga: 2016–17

Torreense

- Liga 3: 2021–22

Oțelul Galați

- Cupa României runner-up: 2023–24
