= Daniel Podence =

Portuguese professional footballer (born 1995)

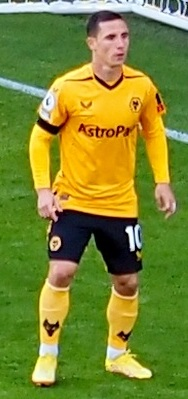
- Podence with Wolverhampton Wanderers in 2022

Personal information
- Full name: Daniel Castelo Podence
- Date of birth: 21 October 1995 (age 31)
- Place of birth: Oeiras, Portugal
- Height: 1.65 m (5 ft 5 in)
- Position: Winger

Team information
- Current team: Al Shabab
- Number: 11

Youth career
- 2003–2005: Belenenses
- 2005–2014: Sporting CP

Senior career*
| Years | Team | Apps | (Gls) |
| 2013–2016 | Sporting CP B | 79 | (9) |
| 2014–2018 | Sporting CP | 25 | (0) |
| 2016–2017 | → Moreirense (loan) | 14 | (4) |
| 2018–2020 | Olympiacos | 42 | (8) |
| 2020–2024 | Wolverhampton Wanderers | 93 | (12) |
| 2023–2024 | → Olympiacos (loan) | 31 | (11) |
| 2024– | Al Shabab | 25 | (2) |
| 2025–2026 | → Olympiacos (loan) | 21 | (2) |

International career
| 2011 | Portugal U16 | 2 | (0) |
| 2013 | Portugal U18 | 5 | (0) |
| 2014 | Portugal U19 | 3 | (0) |
| 2014 | Portugal U20 | 1 | (0) |
| 2016–2017 | Portugal U21 | 9 | (3) |
| 2020 | Portugal | 1 | (0) |
- * Club domestic league appearances and goals as of 21:20, 30 October 2026 (UTC)

Daniel Castelo Podence (born 21 October 1995) is a Portuguese professional footballer who plays as a winger for Saudi Pro League club Al Shabab.

He started his career with Sporting CP, appearing in 40 competitive matches and also being loaned to Moreirense, with whom he won the 2017 Taça da Liga. He then joined Olympiacos, winning the 2019–20 Super League Greece. In January 2020, he signed with Wolverhampton Wanderers. He returned to Olympiacos on loan for the 2023–24 season, winning the Conference League. He moved to Al-Shabab in September 2024, returning to Olympiacos for a third spell in 2025.

Podence made his full debut for Portugal in 2020.

== Club career ==
=== Sporting CP ===
Born in Oeiras, Lisbon, Podence joined Sporting CP's youth system shortly before his 10th birthday, arriving from neighbouring Belenenses. On 3 February 2013, whilst still a junior, he made his senior debut, appearing for the former's reserves in a Segunda Liga match against Marítimo B after coming on as a late substitute for Bruma.

Podence played his first official game for the first team on 29 December 2014, starting in a 2–0 away win over Vitória de Guimarães in the final stages of the Taça da Liga. He was then loaned to Moreirense in a season-long move. He made his debut in the Primeira Liga on 17 September 2016 in a 2–0 loss at Estoril, scoring his first goal in the competition on 29 October in another away fixture, against Tondela (a 2–1 victory). On 4 December 2016, his brace helped the hosts to a 3–1 win over Nacional, and he also made three appearances for the club in the League Cup campaign, which ended with them winning their first-ever trophy.

In late January 2017, Podence was recalled by Sporting manager Jorge Jesus. He terminated his contract on 1 June 2018, following a violent attack on the players by a number of their own supporters.

=== Olympiacos ===
On 9 July 2018, Podence joined Olympiacos on a five-year deal. His first competitive appearance took place on 9 August in a 4–0 home victory against Luzern in the third qualifying round of the UEFA Europa League, and he scored his first goal later that month in a 1–1 draw at Burnley in the same competition (4–2 aggregate win). He finished his first season in the Super League Greece with eight goals in all competitions, and the team finished in second place.

On 2 September 2019, after a litigation with Sporting, both clubs reached a €7 million settlement. Sixteen days later, in his first match in the group phase of the UEFA Champions League, Podence helped Olympiacos come back from a 2–0 home deficit to a 2–2 draw against Tottenham Hotspur, scoring in the 44th minute after an individual effort.

=== Wolverhampton Wanderers ===
On 30 January 2020, Podence moved to Wolverhampton Wanderers on a four-and-a-half-year contract for a £16.9 million transfer fee. He made his debut as a substitute, in a 0–0 draw with Manchester United at Old Trafford. His first start was on 27 February in the second leg of the Europa League's round of 32 away to Espanyol, providing two assists in the 3–2 loss.

Podence's first start in the English Premier League was on 12 July 2020, in a 3–0 home defeat of Everton in which he drew the foul that resulted in a penalty (converted by Raúl Jiménez) that put the side 1–0 up at the end of the first half; Sky Sports named him "Player of the match" for his performance. He scored his first league goal the following weekend, with a header to open the scoring against Crystal Palace in an eventual 2–0 home win.

Podence scored his first league goal of the 2020–21 campaign on 30 October 2020, also against Crystal Palace and at Molineux Stadium, in a 2–0 victory. He was BBC Sport's Player of the match in a league game at home to Chelsea on 15 December, in which he scored his team's opening goal as they came from behind to win 2–1.

On 9 January 2022, Podence scored a brace – one in each half – in Wolves's 3–0 home defeat of Sheffield United in the third round of the FA Cup. His first in the domestic league in that season arrived on 20 February, in the 2–1 home win over Leicester City.

On 26 December 2022, Podence opened an eventual 2–1 victory at Everton in Julen Lopetegui's debut as new head coach; in this match, the player also celebrated his 75th league appearance for the club. On 5 April 2023, the Football Association charged him for an alleged spitting offence against Brennan Johnson during his side's 1–1 draw at Nottingham Forest four days earlier in which he scored a late equaliser, and he faced a mandatory six-match suspension if found guilty; he denied the accusations, being cleared of any wrongdoing on 23 May.

Podence fell out of favour ahead of the 2023–24 campaign, being omitted from the preseason squad and sent to train with the under-21s. Manager Gary O'Neil stated about the player that "at the moment the squad's ambition – and where we're trying to get to – and Daniel's aren't aligned."

On 4 September 2023, Podence returned to Olympiacos on a season-long loan. He totalled 15 goals and 13 assists in all competitions, contributing one in eight appearances in the team's victorious run in the UEFA Conference League.

=== Al Shabab ===
On 3 September 2024, Podence joined Saudi Arabian club Al Shabab. One year later, he returned to Olympiacos on loan. He scored on his third debut for the latter on 13 September 2025, in a 5–0 home win over Panserraikos.

== International career ==
Podence scored in his first two appearances for the Portugal under-21 team, in October 2016 matches against Hungary (3–3) and Liechtenstein (7–1 rout) for the 2017 UEFA European Championship qualifying stage. Selected for the finals in Poland, he repeated the feat in the 4–2 group-phase victory over North Macedonia.

In September 2019, Podence was called up to the senior squad for UEFA Euro 2020 qualifiers with Serbia and Lithuania. He made his debut 13 months later, playing 15 minutes in place of João Félix in a 3–0 home win against Sweden in the Nations League.

== Career statistics ==
=== Club ===
As of match played 17 May 2026

Appearances and goals by club, season and competition
| Club | Season | League | | | National cup (Note: Includes Taça de Portugal, Greek Cup, FA Cup, King's Cup) | | League cup (Note: Includes Taça da Liga, EFL Cup) | | Continental | | Other | | Total | |
| Club | Season | Division | Apps | Goals | Apps | Goals | Apps | Goals | Apps | Goals | Apps | Goals | Apps | Goals |
|---|---|---|---|---|---|---|---|---|---|---|---|---|---|---|
| Sporting CP B | 2012–13 | Segunda Liga | 6 | 0 | — | | — | | — | | — | | 6 | 0 |
| Sporting CP B | 2013–14 | Segunda Liga | 4 | 0 | — | | — | | — | | — | | 4 | 0 |
| Sporting CP B | 2014–15 | Segunda Liga | 31 | 3 | — | | — | | — | | — | | 31 | 3 |
| Sporting CP B | 2015–16 | LigaPro | 38 | 6 | — | | — | | — | | — | | 38 | 6 |
| Sporting CP B | Total | | 79 | 9 | — | | — | | — | | — | | 79 | 9 |
| Sporting CP | 2014–15 | Primeira Liga | 0 | 0 | 2 | 0 | 4 | 0 | — | | — | | 6 | 0 |
| Sporting CP | 2015–16 | Primeira Liga | 0 | 0 | 0 | 0 | 1 | 0 | 0 | 0 | — | | 1 | 0 |
| Sporting CP | 2016–17 | Primeira Liga | 13 | 0 | 0 | 0 | 0 | 0 | 0 | 0 | — | | 13 | 0 |
| Sporting CP | 2017–18 | Primeira Liga | 12 | 0 | 4 | 0 | 3 | 0 | 1 (Note: Appearances in UEFA Champions League) | 0 | — | | 20 | 0 |
| Sporting CP | Total | | 25 | 0 | 6 | 0 | 8 | 0 | 1 | 0 | — | | 40 | 0 |
| Moreirense (loan) | 2016–17 | Primeira Liga | 14 | 4 | 1 | 0 | 3 | 0 | — | | — | | 18 | 4 |
| Olympiacos | 2018–19 | Super League Greece | 27 | 5 | 2 | 2 | — | | 12 (Note: Appearances in UEFA Europa League) | 1 | — | | 41 | 8 |
| Olympiacos | 2019–20 | Super League Greece | 15 | 3 | 0 | 0 | — | | 12 | 2 | — | | 27 | 5 |
| Olympiacos | Total | | 42 | 8 | 2 | 2 | — | | 24 | 3 | — | | 68 | 13 |
| Wolverhampton Wanderers | 2019–20 | Premier League | 9 | 1 | 0 | 0 | — | | 4 | 0 | — | | 13 | 1 |
| Wolverhampton Wanderers | 2020–21 | Premier League | 24 | 3 | 0 | 0 | 1 | 0 | — | | — | | 25 | 3 |
| Wolverhampton Wanderers | 2021–22 | Premier League | 26 | 2 | 2 | 2 | 2 | 2 | — | | — | | 30 | 6 |
| Wolverhampton Wanderers | 2022–23 | Premier League | 32 | 6 | 2 | 0 | 3 | 0 | — | | — | | 37 | 6 |
| Wolverhampton Wanderers | 2024–25 | Premier League | 2 | 0 | — | | 1 | 0 | — | | — | | 3 | 0 |
| Wolverhampton Wanderers | Total | | 93 | 12 | 4 | 2 | 7 | 2 | 4 | 0 | — | | 108 | 16 |
| Olympiacos (loan) | 2023–24 | Super League Greece | 31 | 11 | 2 | 0 | — | | 14 (Note: Six appearances and three goals in UEFA Europa League, eight appearances and one goal in UEFA Conference League) | 4 | — | | 47 | 15 |
| Al Shabab | 2024–25 | Saudi Pro League | 19 | 2 | 2 | 1 | — | | — | | — | | 21 | 3 |
| Olympiacos (Ioan) | 2025–26 | Super League Greece | 21 | 2 | 3 | 0 | — | | 8 | 0 | 1 (Note: Appearance in Greek Super Cup) | 0 | 33 | 2 |
| Career total | | | 324 | 48 | 20 | 5 | 18 | 2 | 51 | 7 | 1 | 0 | 414 | 62 |

=== International ===
Appearances and goals by national team and year
| National team | Year | Apps | Goals |
|---|---|---|---|
| Portugal | 2020 | 1 | 0 |
| Total | | 1 | 0 |

== Honours ==
Sporting CP

- Taça de Portugal: 2014–15
- Taça da Liga: 2017–18

Moreirense

- Taça da Liga: 2016–17

Olympiacos

- Super League Greece: 2019–20
- Greek Super Cup: 2025
- UEFA Conference League: 2023–24

Individual

- Super League Greece Team of the Season: 2018–19
- Super League Greece Goal of the Season: 2023–24
- UEFA Conference League Team of the Season: 2023–24
