= André Micael =

Portuguese footballer

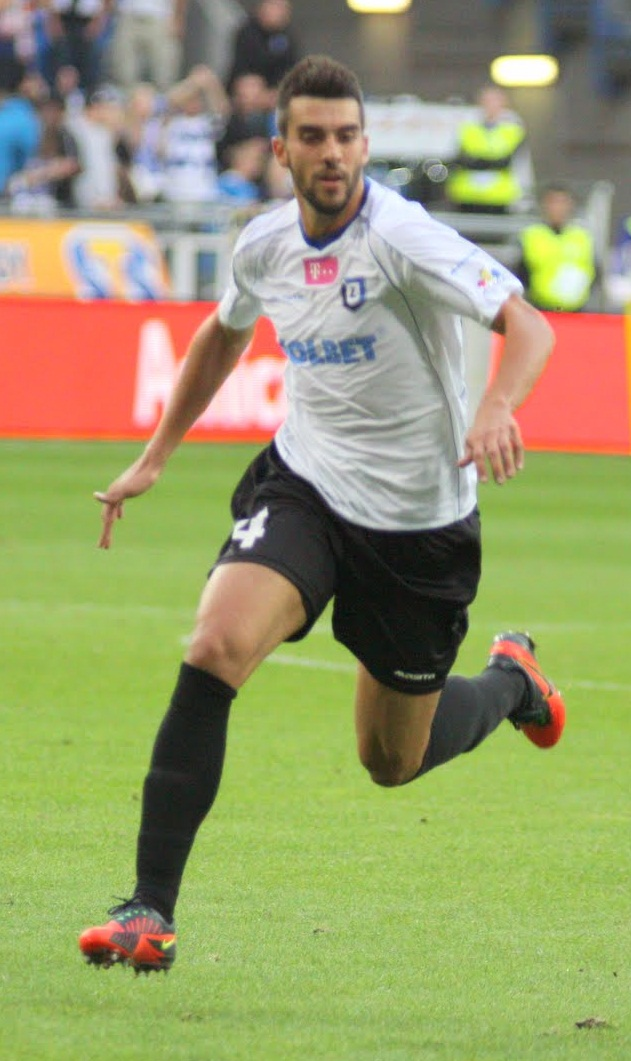
- Micael with Zawisza Bydgoszcz in 2013

Personal information
- Full name: André Micael Pereira
- Date of birth: 4 February 1989 (age 37)
- Place of birth: Guimarães, Portugal
- Height: 1.87 m (6 ft 2 in)
- Position: Centre-back

Youth career
- 1999−2006: Moreirense
- 2006−2008: Vitória Guimarães

Senior career*
Years	Team	Apps	(Gls)
2008−2011	Moreirense	56	(1)
2011−2013	Olhanense	32	(1)
2013−2015	Zawisza Bydgoszcz	64	(2)
2015−2018	Moreirense	51	(2)
2018	Al Faisaly	0	(0)
2018−2019	Gaz Metan Mediaș	12	(0)
2019–2020	Paços Ferreira	7	(0)
2020–2022	Varzim	60	(2)
Total		282	(8)
- * Club domestic league appearances and goals

André Micael Pereira (born 4 February 1989), known as Micael, is a Portuguese former professional footballer who played as a central defender.

== Club career ==
Born in Guimarães, Micael progressed through the ranks of local teams Moreirense F.C. and Vitória S.C. before making his senior debut with the former in the third division in September 2008; he was a regular as they won promotion to the Segunda Liga in the 2009–10 season. In January 2011, he transferred to Primeira Liga club S.C. Olhanense to replace Jardel, who had been sold to S.L. Benfica.

In 2013, Micael signed for Zawisza Bydgoszcz of Poland's Ekstraklasa. In his first season, he and his compatriots Alvarinho and Bernardo Vasconcelos won the Polish Cup on penalties against Zagłębie Lubin, and months later, under Portuguese manager Jorge Paixão and with Joshua Silva besides him in defence, the team beat Legia Warsaw 3–2 in the Polish Super Cup.

Micael returned to Moreirense, now in the top flight, on a three-year contract on 11 June 2015. On 29 January 2017, he played in their 1–0 victory over S.C. Braga in the final of the Taça da Liga at the Estádio Algarve, their first major honour.

After a year abroad with Saudi Arabian club Al Faisaly FC and CS Gaz Metan Mediaș of Romania's Liga I, Micael signed a one-year deal at newly promoted F.C. Paços de Ferreira on 8 July 2019. On his debut on 3 August, he scored in the 1–1 home draw with G.D. Estoril Praia in the second round of the league cup (advancing on penalties). In his second league fixture on 20 September, he was sent off in a 2–1 defeat of C.D. Aves that was the first victory of the campaign for the side.

Rarely used in his year at Paços, Micael dropped down a league and joined Varzim S.C. on 31 July 2020. On 4 April 2022, he scored a brace to help the hosts come from behind to defeat FC Porto B 2–1.

== Honours ==
Moreirense

- Taça da Liga: 2016–17
- Segunda Divisão: 2009–10

Zawisza Bydgoszcz

- Polish Cup: 2013–14
- Polish Super Cup: 2014
