= Igor Rocha (footballer, born 1993) =

Portuguese footballer

Personal information
- Full name: Igor Ferreira Rocha
- Date of birth: 4 March 1993 (age 33)
- Place of birth: Argoncilhe, Portugal
- Height: 1.84 m (6 ft 0 in)
- Position: Goalkeeper

Team information
- Current team: Valadares Gaia

Youth career
- 2001−2003: Espinho
- 2003−2008: Porto
- 2008−2009: Padroense
- 2009−2010: Porto
- 2010: Padroense
- 2010−2011: Braga
- 2011−2012: Nacional

Senior career*
Years	Team	Apps	(Gls)
2012–2018	Arouca	2	(0)
2018–2019	Coimbrões	28	(0)
2019–	Valadares Gaia	7	(0)

International career
2009	Portugal U16	2	(0)
2009	Portugal U17	2	(0)
2010	Portugal U18	1	(0)
- * Club domestic league appearances and goals as of 8 March 2020

Igor Ferreira Rocha (born 4 March 1993) is a Portuguese footballer who plays for Valadares Gaia Futebol Clube as a goalkeeper.

== Club career ==
Born in Argoncilhe, Santa Maria da Feira, Rocha played for a host of clubs as a youth, finishing his development with C.D. Nacional after joining in 2011. In the 2011–12 season he started training with the first team, but only managed five bench appearances during his one-year stint with the Madeirans.

In the summer of 2012, Rocha signed for F.C. Arouca of the second division. On 18 May 2013, the last day of the campaign, he made his debut as a professional, starting in a 2–4 away loss against C.D. Tondela.

Rocha's input in the Primeira Liga consisted of one minute in a 0–1 defeat at C.F. Belenenses, after coming on as a substitute for Rui Sacramento in the last matchday. He acted as third-choice during his spell at the Estádio Municipal de Arouca.
