= Igor Rocha (footballer, born 1984) =

Portuguese footballer

Personal information
- Full name: Igor Miguel Castro Rocha
- Date of birth: 3 May 1984 (age 42)
- Place of birth: Vila Nova de Gaia, Portugal
- Height: 1.86 m (6 ft 1 in)
- Position: Left back

Team information
- Current team: Valadares Gaia

Youth career
- 1995–1997: Avintes
- 1997–1999: Boavista
- 1999–2000: Pasteleira
- 2000–2003: Boavista

Senior career*
Years	Team	Apps	(Gls)
2003–2005	Boavista	0	(0)
2003–2004	→ Ribeirão (loan)		
2004–2005	→ União Lamas (loan)	18	(0)
2005–2006	Dragões Sandinenses	7	(0)
2006–2007	Ribeirão	24	(1)
2007–2009	Naval	10	(0)
2009–2011	Trofense	51	(0)
2011–2013	Vitória Setúbal	16	(0)
2013–2014	Santa Clara	39	(0)
2014–2015	Feirense	37	(0)
2015–2018	Santa Clara	89	(2)
2018–2019	Vizela	27	(1)
2019–2020	Fátima	17	(0)
2020–	Valadares Gaia	7	(0)
- * Club domestic league appearances and goals as of 8 March 2020

Igor Miguel Castro Rocha (born 3 May 1984) is a Portuguese professional footballer who plays for Valadares Gaia Futebol Clube as a left back.

== Club career ==
Born in Vila Nova de Gaia, Porto District, Rocha spent most of his career in the Segunda Liga after being formed at Boavista FC. He appeared in 216 matches at that level for C.D. Trofense, C.D. Santa Clara (two spells) and C.D. Feirense.

Rocha spent four seasons in the Primeira Liga, making a combined 26 appearances for Associação Naval 1º de Maio and Vitória de Setúbal. He made his debut in the competition while at the service of the former club, playing 63 minutes in a 0–2 home loss against S.L. Benfica on 17 February 2008.
