= Tucka =

Portuguese footballer (born 1996)

Personal information
- Full name: Artur Jorge dos Santos Soares
- Date of birth: 15 February 1996 (age 30)
- Place of birth: Arouca, Portugal
- Height: 1.82 m (6 ft 0 in)
- Position: Forward

Team information
- Current team: UD Mansores
- Number: 21

Youth career
- 2012–2014: Arouca

Senior career*
Years	Team	Apps	(Gls)
2015–2019	Arouca	1	(0)
2015–2016	→ AD Oliveirense (loan)	30	(3)
2017	→ Limianos (loan)	13	(4)
2018	→ Gafanha (loan)	11	(2)
2018	→ Águeda (loan)	3	(0)
2018–2019	→ Esmoriz (loan)	3	(0)
2019–2020	UD Mansores	11	(2)
2020–2021	JD Carregosense	6	(0)
2021-2022	UD Mansores	21	(5)
2022-	UD Mansores	10	(1)
- * Club domestic league appearances and goals as of 20:37, 25 January 2021 (UTC)

Artur Jorge dos Santos Soares (born 15 February 1996), better known simply as Tucka, is a Portuguese professional footballer who plays as a forward for Juventude Desportiva Carregosense.

== Club career ==
Tucka made his senior league debut for Arouca on 23 May 2015 in a Primeira Liga 1–2 home loss against Moreirense. He spent time on loan with a LigaPro side AD Oliveirense, making 30 league appearances and scoring 3 goals.
