= Zé Pedro (footballer, born 1991) =

Portuguese footballer

Personal information
- Full name: José Pedro Cepeda Espinhosa Teixeira
- Date of birth: 16 February 1991 (age 35)
- Place of birth: Braga, Portugal
- Height: 1.87 m (6 ft 1 1/2 in)
- Position: Centre-back

Youth career
- 2000–2001: Gondomar
- 2001–2009: Porto
- 2006–2007: → Padroense (loan)
- 2009–2010: Leixões

Senior career*
Years	Team	Apps	(Gls)
2010–2015	Leixões	104	(4)
2015–2017	Covilhã	64	(5)
2016	Covilhã B	1	(0)
2017–2018	Famalicão	24	(1)
2018–2021	Gondomar	70	(12)
2019	Gondomar B	1	(0)
2021–2022	Vilaverdense	24	(1)
2022–2023	Gondomar	20	(1)
2023	Espinho	5	(0)
Total		313	(24)
- * Club domestic league appearances and goals

José Pedro Cepeda Espinhosa Teixeira (born 16 February 1991), known as Zé Pedro, is a Portuguese former professional footballer who played as a centre-back.

== Club career ==
Zé Pedro was born in Braga. After spending the better part of his youth career at FC Porto, he went on to play 192 matches in the Segunda Liga over eight seasons, totalling ten goals for Leixões SC, S.C. Covilhã and F.C. Famalicão.

On 21 August 2011, Zé Pedro scored his first goal in the second tier, as a substitute for Leixões in a 1–0 away win against Associação Naval 1º de Maio. While a member of Covilhã, he netted a career-best five times in the 2015–16 campaign, including an injury-time brace in the 2–2 draw at his former club Leixões.
