= Nelsinho (footballer, born 1988) =

Brazilian footballer

Personal information
- Full name: Nélson Barbosa Conceição
- Date of birth: 1 January 1988 (age 38)
- Place of birth: Bahia, Brazil
- Height: 1.76 m (5 ft 9 in)
- Position: Left-back

Team information
- Current team: Jeunesse Canach
- Number: 84

Senior career*
Years	Team	Apps	(Gls)
2008	Corinthians Paranaense		
2010	Foz do Iguaçu		
2011	Corinthians Paranaense	4	(0)
2011	Toledo		
2012	Corinthians Paranaense	19	(0)
2012	Foz do Iguaçu		
2012–2014	Portimonense	67	(0)
2014–2018	Arouca	47	(1)
2018–2019	Doxa Katokopias	22	(0)
2019	Vilafranquense	2	(0)
2020	Doxa Katokopias	5	(0)
2020–2021	Xylotymbou		
2021–2022	Paris 13 Atletico	16	(0)
2023–	Jeunesse Canach	78	(2)
- * Club domestic league appearances and goals as of 25 May 2026

Nélson Barbosa Conceição (born 1 January 1988), simply known as Nelsinho, is a Brazilian professional footballer who plays as a left-back for Luxembourg National Division club Jeunesse Canach.

== Career ==
On 29 May 2014, Nelsinho signed for Arouca in the Primeira Liga for a free transfer.
