= Welthon =

Brazilian footballer

Personal information
- Full name: Welthon Fiel Sampaio
- Date of birth: 21 June 1992 (age 34)
- Place of birth: Belém, Brazil
- Height: 1.80 m (5 ft 11 in)
- Position: Forward

Team information
- Current team: Capitão Poço

Senior career*
Years	Team	Apps	(Gls)
2010	Tuna Luso	0	(0)
2011–2012	Atlético Goianiense	2	(0)
2013–2014	Grêmio Anápolis	12	(3)
2014	→ Braga B (loan)	9	(2)
2015	→ Independente (loan)	0	(0)
2015–2016	→ Remo (loan)	7	(1)
2016–2018	Paços de Ferreira	42	(15)
2018–2021	Vitória SC	23	(1)
2019–2020	→ Paços de Ferreira (loan)	7	(0)
2021	Vitória SC B	7	(3)
2022	Remo	3	(0)
2022	Castanhal	14	(4)
2022	Carajás	2	(0)
2023	Tuna Luso	10	(6)
2023–2024	Torreense	22	(7)
2024–2025	Kitchee	15	(8)
2026–	Capitão Poço	2	(1)
- * Club domestic league appearances and goals as of 19 March 2026

Welthon Fiel Sampaio (born 21 June 1992) is a Brazilian professional footballer who plays as a forward for Capitão Poço.

== Club career ==
Born in Belém, Welthon played once in the Campeonato Paraense for hometown club Tuna Luso in 2010 before moving to Atlético Goianense. Though he never took to the pitch in the Campeonato Brasileiro Série A for the team, he played twice in their Campeonato Goiano win in 2011.

In November 2012, Welthon moved to Grêmio Anápolis in the same state. The following July, he was loaned to Braga, a Portuguese club partnered with his employer. His loan at the reserve team from the Segunda Liga ended in January 2014.

In June 2016, Welthon returned to Portugal with Primeira Liga club Paços de Ferreira. He finished his first season in the top flight with 11 goals, joint-seventh best in the league; this included braces in home and away wins over Vitória FC. He was also top scorer of the season's Taça da Liga with four, in braces against Nacional and Vizela.

On 23 January 2018, Welthon transferred to neighbours Vitória SC on a four-year deal, with a release clause of €30 million. After six goalless games, his season ended with three matches to go due to a left thigh injury in training. He scored his only goal for the team on 5 March 2019, the sole one of a home win over Marítimo.

On 2 September 2019, Welthon returned to Paços on a season-long loan, after Ivo Vieira demoted him to Vitória's reserves. In November, he suffered a right knee injury in a win over Tondela, and played only once again thereafter.

Welthon was named as a surplus player on Vitória's squad for 2020–21. He made a substitute appearance for the B-team in the third tier on 14 February 2021, his first game in 13 months.

On 25 July 2024, Welthon joined Hong Kong Premier League club Kitchee.

== Honours ==
=== Club ===
Atlético Goianiense

- Campeonato Goiano: 2011

Remo

- Campeonato Paraense: 2022

=== Individual ===
- Taça da Liga top scorer: 2016–17 (4 goals)
- Liga Portugal 2 Player of the Month: September 2023
- Liga Portugal 2 Forward of the Month: August 2023, September 2023
