= Joel Vital =

Portuguese footballer

Personal information
- Full name: Joel Ângelo Couto Ferreiro Vital
- Date of birth: 7 December 1987 (age 38)
- Place of birth: Porto, Portugal
- Height: 1.84 m (6 ft 1/2 in)
- Position: Defender

Team information
- Current team: Sporting Covilhã
- Number: 13

Youth career
- 1996–1999: Bairro do Falcão
- 1999–2004: Salgueiros
- 2005–2006: Benfica

Senior career*
Years	Team	Apps	(Gls)
2004–2005	Salgueiros	34	(0)
2006–2007	Canedo	21	(0)
2007–2009	Madalena	22	(0)
2009–2010	Candal	30	(2)
2010–2013	Cinfães	83	(9)
2013–	Sporting Covilhã	102	(2)
- * Club domestic league appearances and goals as of 19 March 2017

Joel Ângelo Couto Ferreiro Vital, known as Joel Vital (born 7 December 1987) is a Portuguese football player who plays for Sporting Covilhã.

== Club career ==
He made his professional debut in the Segunda Liga for Sporting Covilhã on 11 August 2013 in a game against Marítimo B.
