= Éder Díez =

Spanish footballer (born 1987)

Personal information
- Full name: Éder Díez Sánchez
- Date of birth: 15 July 1987 (age 39)
- Place of birth: Barakaldo, Spain
- Height: 1.87 m (6 ft 2 in)
- Position: Forward

Team information
- Current team: La Almunia

Youth career
- Athletic Bilbao

Senior career*
Years	Team	Apps	(Gls)
2005–2008	Basconia	46	(16)
2007–2009	Bilbao Athletic	32	(1)
2009–2010	Sestao	24	(4)
2010–2011	Celta B	15	(1)
2011	→ Lemona (loan)	11	(2)
2011–2012	Ourense	31	(14)
2012–2014	Chaves	42	(9)
2014	→ Pedras Salgadas (loan)	5	(0)
2015	Mafra	9	(0)
2015–2016	Pedras Rubras	7	(4)
2016	Covilhã	24	(5)
2016–2017	Varzim	20	(2)
2016	Varzim B	4	(0)
2017–2018	Fafe	16	(3)
2018	Pontevedra	12	(5)
2018–2019	Badajoz	34	(10)
2019–2020	Lleida Esportiu	25	(6)
2020–2021	Melilla	21	(1)
2021–2023	Ebro	62	(7)
2023–2024	Brea	26	(5)
2024–	La Almunia	7	(0)
- * Club domestic league appearances and goals as of 20 October 2024

Éder Díez Sánchez (born 15 July 1987) is a Spanish professional footballer who plays as a forward for La Almunia.

He never played any higher than the Segunda División B in his own country, recording figures of 174 matches and 30 goals for eight clubs. He also spent several years in Portugal, where he made 59 professional appearances and scored eight goals in LigaPro for Chaves, Covilhã and Varzim.

== Club career ==
=== Early years ===
Born in Barakaldo in the Basque Country, Díez came through the youth ranks of Athletic Bilbao. He made his senior debut with farm team CD Basconia of the Tercera División, then rose to the reserves in Segunda División B. He spent the following seasons also in the third division, with Sestao River Club (relegated), Celta de Vigo B and SD Lemona (on loan).

In July 2011, Díez dropped down a division to play for CD Ourense.

=== Portugal ===
Díez moved abroad in 2012, joining G.D. Chaves in Portugal's third tier. The team from Trás-os-Montes won the league title in his first season, and the following campaign he had his first professional experience in the Segunda Liga; for 2014–15 he was loaned back down a division to satellite club Juventude de Pedras Salgadas, before terminating his contract in December 2014.

Díez then signed for C.D. Mafra of division three, now renamed the Campeonato de Portugal, and again won the league title in 2015. After a spell with F.C. Pedras Rubras, he returned to the second division in January 2016 when he moved to S.C. Covilhã until the end of the season with the option of another year.

On 31 August 2016, Díez rescinded his contract after five games of the season and moved across the league to Varzim SC. In July 2017, having become a free agent, he signed for AD Fafe of the third tier.

=== Return home ===
On 31 January 2018, Díez ended his spell abroad when he signed for Pontevedra CF in Spain's third division. In July that year, he transferred to CD Badajoz. He had his most prolific year representing the Extremadurans, scoring ten goals and reaching the play-offs for the first time in his career (quarter-final defeat to UD Logroñés).

In July 2019, Díez agreed to a one-year deal at Lleida Esportiu with the option for a second. Fourteen months later, he was added to UD Melilla for one season.

Having scored only once during his year in the North African exclave, Díez signed with CD Ebro of the new fourth tier, the Segunda División RFEF, on 18 July 2021.
