= Miguel Oliveira (footballer, born 1983) =

Portuguese footballer

Personal information
- Full name: Pedro Miguel dos Santos Oliveira
- Date of birth: 18 August 1983 (age 43)
- Place of birth: Braga, Portugal
- Height: 1.86 m (6 ft 1 in)
- Position: Centre-back

Youth career
- 1994–2002: Braga

Senior career*
Years	Team	Apps	(Gls)
2002–2006	Braga B	106	(2)
2004–2006	Braga	0	(0)
2006–2007	Gondomar	20	(2)
2007–2009	Estoril	48	(3)
2009–2011	Ermis	51	(2)
2011–2012	Moreirense	21	(0)
2012–2015	Arouca	63	(3)
2015–2016	Chaves	25	(0)
2016–2018	Vizela	37	(1)
2018	Vilaverdense	8	(0)
2018–2019	Gondomar B	24	(2)
2019	Dumiense	10	(1)
Total		413	(16)
- * Club domestic league appearances and goals

Pedro Miguel dos Santos Oliveira (born 18 August 1983 in Braga) is a Portuguese former professional footballer who played as a central defender.
