= Diego Galo (footballer, born 1984) =

Brazilian footballer (born 1984)

Personal information
- Full name: Diego Fortunato dos Santos Queiroz
- Date of birth: 14 January 1984 (age 42)
- Place of birth: Diadema, Brazil
- Height: 1.85 m (6 ft 1 in)
- Position: Centre-back

Team information
- Current team: Valadares Gaia

Senior career*
Years	Team	Apps	(Gls)
2006–2007	Atibaia		
2007	Flamengo		
2008	Flamengo de Arcoverde		
2008	Misto		
2009	Osvaldo Cruz		
2009–2011	Tondela	53	(5)
2011–2013	Oliveirense	61	(1)
2013–2015	Arouca	61	(1)
2015–2016	União da Madeira	34	(0)
2016–2017	Moreirense	31	(0)
2017–2019	Desportivo das Aves	52	(1)
2019–2020	Chaves	19	(2)
2020–2022	União Leiria	56	(6)
2023	Cesarense		
2024	Fiães		
2024	Pombal	2	(0)
2024–	Valadares Gaia		
- * Club domestic league appearances and goals as of 25 August 2024

Diego Fortunato dos Santos Queiroz (born 14 January 1984), known as Diego Galo, is a Brazilian professional footballer who plays for Portuguese club Valadares Gaia.

== Career ==
In June 2015, Galo left the Arouquenses for newly promoted União da Madeira.

On 11 July 2019, he signed a one-year contract with Portuguese club Chaves.

== Honours ==
Tondela

- Terceira Divisão: 2008–09

Moreirense

- Taça da Liga: 2016–17

Desportivo das Aves

- Taça de Portugal: 2017–18
