= 2016–17 Taça da Liga =

Taça CTT

Tournament details
- Host country: Portugal
- Dates: 30 July 2016 – 29 January 2017
- Teams: 35

Final positions
- Champions: Moreirense (1st title)
- Runners-up: Braga

Tournament statistics
- Matches played: 46
- Goals scored: 103 (2.24 per match)
- Top scorer: Welthon (4 goals)

The 2016–17 Taça da Liga was the tenth edition of the Taça da Liga, a football cup competition organized by the Liga Portuguesa de Futebol Profissional (LPFP) and contested exclusively by clubs competing in the top two professional tiers of Portuguese football. The competition was sponsored by CTT and, therefore, was known as Taça CTT for a second season.

A total of 35 teams contested the tournament, including 18 teams from the 2016–17 Primeira Liga and 17 non-reserve teams from the 2016–17 LigaPro. The competition format suffered changes for the second consecutive year, with the number of teams being reduced and the semi-finals being played on the same week of the final, in late January.

Benfica were the three-time defending holders but failed to defend their title, losing to Moreirense in the semi-finals. This result marked Benfica's first defeat in the competition since 31 October 2007 and put an end to a 42-game unbeaten run. Moreirense beat Braga 1–0 to win their first domestic cup in their first ever appearance in a cup final.

== Format ==
On 19 June 2015, the LPFP announced that the number of teams in the 2016–17 LigaPro season would be reduced to 22, thus reducing the number of teams that would play in the Taça da Liga from 37 to 35.

On 28 June 2016, the LPFP approved some changes in relation to the semi-finals matches. Both the semi-finals and final match will be played in the same week, and on the same stadium.

Seventeen teams competing in the 2016–17 LigaPro (reserve teams from Primeira Liga clubs are excluded) took part in the first round; one-legged ties were played between sixteen teams, with the seventeenth team receiving a bye to the next round.

In the second round, the nine teams advancing from the previous round (eight winners plus the team with a bye) were joined by the twelve teams placed 5th–16th in the 2015–16 Primeira Liga and by the two teams promoted to 2016–17 Primeira Liga. Again, one-legged ties were played between 22 teams, with the 23rd team receiving a bye to the next round.

The third round featured the twelve teams advancing from the previous round (eleven winners plus the team with a bye) and the four best-placed teams in the 2015–16 Primeira Liga. The sixteen teams were drawn into four groups that were contested in a single round-robin format, with each team playing at least one game at home. The four group winners qualified for the semi-finals, which were played as single-legged ties. The semi-finals and final were played at a neutral venue.

Round	Teams entering in this round	Teams advancing from previous round
First round (17 teams)	17 teams competing in the 2016–17 LigaPro	
Second round (23 teams)	12 teams ranked 5th–16th in the 2015–16 Primeira Liga; 2 teams promoted to the 2016–17 Primeira Liga	8 winners from the first round; 1 team that received a bye
Third round (16 teams)	4 teams ranked 1st–4th in the 2015–16 Primeira Liga	11 winners from the second round; 1 team that received a bye
Semi-finals (4 teams)		4 group winners from the third round
Final (2 teams)		2 winners from the semi-finals

=== Tiebreakers ===
In the third round, teams are ranked according to points (3 points for a win, 1 point for a draw, 0 points for a loss). If two or more teams are tied on points on completion of the group matches, the following criteria are applied to determine the rankings:

1. highest goal difference in all group matches;
2. highest number of scored goals in all group matches;
3. lowest average age of all players fielded in all group matches (sum of the ages of all fielded players divided by the number of fielded players).

In all other rounds, teams tied at the end of regular time contest a penalty shootout to determine the winner.

== Teams ==
Thirty-five teams competing in the two professional tiers of Portuguese football for the 2016–17 season are eligible to participate in this competition. For Primeira Liga teams, the final league position in the previous season determined in which round they enter the competition.

Third round (Primeira Liga)
Benfica (1st)	Sporting CP (2nd)	Porto (3rd)	Braga (4th)
Second round (Primeira Liga)
Arouca (5th)	Rio Ave (6th)	Paços de Ferreira (7th)	Estoril (8th)
Belenenses (9th)	Vitória de Guimarães (10th)	Nacional (11th)	Moreirense (12th)
Marítimo (13th)	Boavista (14th)	Vitória de Setúbal (15th)	Tondela (16th)
Chaves (P1)	Feirense (P1)		
First round (LigaPro)
União da Madeira (R1)	Académica (R1)	Portimonense (4th)	Freamunde (5th)
Famalicão (6th)	Olhanense (7th)	Desportivo das Aves (8th)	Varzim (9th)
Gil Vicente (11th)	Penafiel (12th)	Sporting da Covilhã (14th)	Santa Clara (16th)
Académico de Viseu (17th)	Leixões (18th)	Cova da Piedade (P2)	Vizela (P2)
Fafe (P2)			

Key

- Nth: League position in the 2015–16 season
- P1: Promoted to the Primeira Liga
- P2: Promoted to the LigaPro
- R1: Relegated to the LigaPro

== Schedule ==
All draws were held at the LPFP headquarters in Porto, except for the draw for the first and second rounds, which took place in Santa Maria da Feira.

Round		Draw date	Match date(s)	Teams	Fixtures
First round		15 July 2016	31 July 2016	35 → 27	8
Second round		15 July 2016	25–27 October 2016	27 → 16	11
Third round	Matchday 1	9 November 2016	30 November–1 December 2016	16 → 4	24
Third round	Matchday 2	9 November 2016	29–30 December 2016	16 → 4	24
Third round	Matchday 3	9 November 2016	3–5 January 2017	16 → 4	24
Final four	Semi-finals	9 November 2016	25–26 January 2017	4 → 2	2
Final four	Final	9 November 2016	29 January 2017	2 → 1	1

== First round ==
The 17 non-reserve teams competing in the 2016–17 LigaPro entered the competition in this round. Sixteen teams were paired against each other for eight single-legged ties, while the seventeenth team (Académico de Viseu) was given a bye to the next round. The draw took place on 15 July 2016, and matches were played on 30 and 31 July 2016.

30 July 2016	Gil Vicente	0–0 (5–4 p)	Académica	Barcelos
18:00 WEST (UTC+01:00)		Report		Stadium: Estádio Cidade de Barcelos; Attendance: 704; Referee: Pedro Vilaça
	Penalties
	Reko (penalty scored); Paulinho (penalty scored); Ricardinho (penalty scored); Avto (penalty scored); Luiz Eduardo (penalty scored)		(penalty scored) Makonda; (penalty scored) Rui Miguel; (penalty scored) Yuri; (penalty scored) Alexandre; (penalty missed) Marreco

30 July 2016	Portimonense	0–1	Santa Clara	Portimão
18:00 WEST (UTC+01:00)		Report	Clemente 27'	Stadium: Estádio Municipal de Portimão; Attendance: 980; Referee: Bruno Vieira

31 July 2016	Fafe	0–1	Vizela	Felgueiras
16:00 WEST (UTC+01:00)		Report	Cláudio 67' (pen.)	Stadium: Estádio Dr. Machado de Matos (Note: Fafe played their home match at Estádio Dr. Machado de Matos, Felgueiras, instead of their regular stadium Estádio Municipal de Fafe, Fafe, due to renovations.); Attendance: 994; Referee: Anzhony Rodrigues

31 July 2016	Olhanense	1–2	Varzim	Olhão
16:00 WEST (UTC+01:00)	Barros 31'	Report	Coentrão 18', 71'	Stadium: Estádio José Arcanjo; Attendance: 339; Referee: António Nobre

31 July 2016	Cova da Piedade	1–1 (4–3 p)	Leixões	Seixal
16:00 WEST (UTC+01:00)	Danielson 65'	Report	Lamas 42' (pen.)	Stadium: Caixa Futebol Campus (Note: Cova da Piedade played their home match at Caixa Futebol Campus, Seixal, instead of their regular stadium Estádio Municipal José Martins Vieira, Cova da Piedade, due to renovations.); Attendance: 595; Referee: Luís Máximo
	Penalties
	Miguel Ângelo (penalty scored); Danielson (penalty missed); Robson (penalty scored); Carvalhas (penalty scored); Chico (penalty scored)		(penalty scored) Lamas; (penalty scored) Manuel José; (penalty scored) Shihao; (penalty missed) Cadú; (penalty missed) Cardoso

31 July 2016	Famalicão	0–3	Penafiel	Vila Nova de Famalicão
17:00 WEST (UTC+01:00)		Report	Fortes 46'; Fernando 78', 90+5'	Stadium: Estádio Municipal 22 de Junho; Attendance: 2,154; Referee: Ioan Vasilica

31 July 2016	Desportivo das Aves	1–1 (4–5 p)	Sporting da Covilhã	Vila das Aves
17:00 WEST (UTC+01:00)	Pedró 3'	Report	Díez 68'	Stadium: Estádio do CD Aves; Attendance: 700; Referee: André Neto
	Penalties
	Pedroso (penalty scored); Guedes (penalty scored); Leandro (penalty missed); João Pedro (penalty scored); Pedró (penalty scored); Zé Tiago (penalty missed)		(penalty scored) Moura; (penalty missed) Aouacheria; (penalty scored) Davidson; (penalty scored) Díez; (penalty scored) Zé Pedro; (penalty scored) Zarabi

31 July 2016	Freamunde	0–1	União da Madeira	Freamunde
17:00 WEST (UTC+01:00)		Report	Breitner 5'	Stadium: Complexo Desportivo do SC Freamunde; Attendance: 616; Referee: Carlos Macedo

== Second round ==
In the second round, the eight first-round winners and Académico de Viseu, who were given a bye to this round, joined the 12 teams ranked 5th–16th in the 2015–16 Primeira Liga and the two teams promoted from the 2015–16 LigaPro. Twenty-two teams were paired against each other for eleven single-legged ties, while the 23rd team (Vitória de Guimarães) was given a bye to the next round. The draw took place on 15 July 2016, and matches were played on 8, 9, 25, 26 and 27 October 2016.

8 October 2016	Boavista	0–1	Belenenses	Porto
15:00 WEST (UTC+01:00)		Report	Almeida 62'	Stadium: Estádio do Bessa; Attendance: 2,720; Referee: Hélder Malheiro

9 October 2016	Feirense	3–0	Tondela	Santa Maria da Feira
16:00 WEST (UTC+01:00)	Fabinho 10' (pen.); Etebo 64'; Crislan 79' (o.g.)	Report		Stadium: Estádio Marcolino de Castro; Attendance: 1,195; Referee: Bruno Paixão

25 October 2016	Paços de Ferreira	4–0	Nacional	Paços de Ferreira
15:30 WEST (UTC+01:00)	Ricardo 15', 90+2'; Welthon 51', 75'	Report		Stadium: Estádio Capital do Móvel; Attendance: 679; Referee: Gonçalo Martins

26 October 2016	Vizela	1–0	Gil Vicente	Vizela
15:00 WEST (UTC+01:00)	Lamelas 51'	Report		Stadium: Estádio do FC Vizela; Attendance: 548; Referee: Anzhony Rodrigues

26 October 2016	Arouca	2–1	Cova da Piedade	Arouca
16:00 WEST (UTC+01:00)	Kuca 3'; Carleto 39' (pen.)	Report	Nunes 11' (pen.)	Stadium: Estádio Municipal de Arouca; Attendance: 286; Referee: Tiago Antunes

26 October 2016	Moreirense	1–0	Estoril	Moreira de Cónegos
16:00 WEST (UTC+01:00)	Maciel 53'	Report		Stadium: Parque de Jogos Comendador Joaquim de Almeida Freitas; Attendance: 345; Referee: João Matos

26 October 2016	Marítimo	3–1	União da Madeira	Funchal, Madeira
16:00 WEST (UTC+01:00)	Costa 41'; Sousa 47'; Ghazaryan 55'	Report	Nsor 1'	Stadium: Estádio do Marítimo; Attendance: 3,669; Referee: Jorge Ferreira

26 October 2016	Varzim	2–0	Académico de Viseu	Póvoa de Varzim
16:00 WEST (UTC+01:00)	Tomé 45+2' (o.g.); Díez 79'	Report		Stadium: Estádio do Varzim SC; Attendance: 650; Referee: Bruno Vieira

26 October 2016	Vitória de Setúbal	2–0	Santa Clara	Setúbal
16:00 WEST (UTC+01:00)	Cardoso 26'; Zé Manuel 27'	Report		Stadium: Estádio do Bonfim; Attendance: 864; Referee: João Mendes

26 October 2016	Penafiel	1–1 (2–4 p)	Sporting da Covilhã	Penafiel
16:00 WEST (UTC+01:00)	P. Ribeiro 24'	Report	Chaby 7'	Stadium: Estádio Municipal 25 de Abril; Attendance: 336; Referee: Pedro Vilaça
	Penalties
	P. Ribeiro (penalty missed); João Paulo (penalty scored); Wellington (penalty missed); Fernando (penalty scored)		(penalty scored) Zé Pedro; (penalty scored) Davidson; (penalty scored) Gilberto; (penalty scored) Joel

27 October 2016	Rio Ave	1–1 (3–1 p)	Chaves	Vila do Conde
18:30 WEST (UTC+01:00)	Ronan 82'	Report	Martins 43'	Stadium: Estádio dos Arcos; Attendance: 932; Referee: Rui Oliveira
	Penalties
	Novais (penalty scored); Pedrinho (penalty missed); Monte (penalty scored); Ronan (penalty scored)		(penalty missed) Battaglia; (penalty missed) Lopes; (penalty missed) Luís Alberto; (penalty scored) Elhouni

== Third round ==
In the third round, the 11 second-round winners and Vitória de Guimarães joined the four top-ranked teams from the 2015–16 Primeira Liga: Benfica (1st), Sporting CP (2nd), Porto (3rd) and Braga (4th). These 16 teams were drawn into four groups of four, each group containing one of the four top-ranked Primeira Liga teams. Group matches were played in a single round-robin format, ensuring that each team played at least one match at home. The draw took place on 9 November 2016, and matches were played on 29 November–1 December, 29–30 December 2016, 2–4 January and 10–11 January 2017.

=== Group A ===
Pos	Team	Pld	W	D	L	GF	GA	GD	Pts	Qualification
1	Vitória de Setúbal	3	2	0	1	3	2	+1	6	Advance to knockout phase
2	Sporting CP	3	2	0	1	3	2	+1	6	
3	Arouca	3	1	0	2	3	2	+1	3	
4	Varzim	3	1	0	2	1	4	−3	3	

Source: LPFP
Rules for classification: Tiebreakers

29 November 2016	Varzim	1–0	Vitória de Setúbal	Póvoa de Varzim
19:15 WET (UTC±00:00)	Jeferson 90+3'	Report		Stadium: Estádio do Varzim SC; Attendance: 682; Referee: Luís Ferreira

30 November 2016	Sporting CP	1–0	Arouca	Lisbon
18:15 WET (UTC±00:00)	A. Ruiz 44'	Report		Stadium: Estádio José Alvalade; Attendance: 10,698; Referee: Hugo Miguel

29 December 2016	Vitória de Setúbal	1–0	Arouca	Setúbal
16:00 WET (UTC±00:00)	Costa 20'	Report		Stadium: Estádio do Bonfim; Attendance: 1,641; Referee: Luís Ferreira

30 December 2016	Sporting CP	1–0	Varzim	Lisbon
21:15 WET (UTC±00:00)	Martins 19'	Report		Stadium: Estádio José Alvalade; Attendance: 24,752; Referee: Bruno Paixão

4 January 2017	Vitória de Setúbal	2–1	Sporting CP	Setúbal
20:15 WET (UTC±00:00)	Venâncio 19'; Edinho 90+4' (pen.)	Report	Elias 79'	Stadium: Estádio do Bonfim; Attendance: 4,231; Referee: Rui Oliveira

4 January 2017	Arouca	3–0	Varzim	Arouca
20:15 WET (UTC±00:00)	De Jesús 4'; Kuca 79'; Crivellaro 90'	Report		Stadium: Estádio Municipal de Arouca; Attendance: 410; Referee: Nuno Almeida

=== Group B ===
Pos	Team	Pld	W	D	L	GF	GA	GD	Pts	Qualification
1	Moreirense	3	2	1	0	6	4	+2	7	Advance to knockout phase
2	Belenenses	3	0	3	0	5	5	0	3	
3	Feirense	3	0	2	1	4	5	−1	2	
4	Porto	3	0	2	1	1	2	−1	2	

Source: LPFP
Rules for classification: Tiebreakers

29 November 2016	Porto	0–0	Belenenses	Porto
21:15 WET (UTC±00:00)		Report		Stadium: Estádio do Dragão; Attendance: 14,228; Referee: Nuno Almeida

1 December 2016	Feirense	1–2	Moreirense	Santa Maria da Feira
18:00 WET (UTC±00:00)	Platiny 49'	Report	Fati 22'; Boateng 45+2'	Stadium: Estádio Marcolino de Castro; Attendance: 1,175; Referee: Fábio Veríssimo

29 December 2016	Moreirense	3–3	Belenenses	Moreira de Cónegos
17:15 WET (UTC±00:00)	Roberto 38', 84'; Cauê 76' (pen.)	Report	Roberto 65' (o.g.); Sousa 70'; Rosa 74'	Stadium: Parque de Jogos Comendador Joaquim de Almeida Freitas; Attendance: 587; Referee: Carlos Xistra

29 December 2016	Porto	1–1	Feirense	Porto
19:15 WET (UTC±00:00)	Marcano 49'	Report	Flávio 73'	Stadium: Estádio do Dragão; Attendance: 41,305; Referee: João Pinheiro

3 January 2017	Moreirense	1–0	Porto	Moreira de Cónegos
21:15 WET (UTC±00:00)	Geraldes 49'	Report		Stadium: Parque de Jogos Comendador Joaquim de Almeida Freitas; Attendance: 2,534; Referee: Luís Godinho

3 January 2017	Belenenses	2–2	Feirense	Lisbon
21:15 WET (UTC±00:00)	Caeiro 64'; Rosa 86'	Report	Fabinho 12'; Karamanos 90+6'	Stadium: Estádio do Restelo; Attendance: 1,132; Referee: Vasco Santos

=== Group C ===
Pos	Team	Pld	W	D	L	GF	GA	GD	Pts	Qualification
1	Braga	3	2	0	1	6	2	+4	6	Advance to knockout phase
2	Rio Ave	3	2	0	1	4	2	+2	6	
3	Marítimo	3	1	1	1	2	2	0	4	
4	Sporting da Covilhã	3	0	1	2	1	7	−6	1	

Source: LPFP
Rules for classification: Tiebreakers

29 December 2016	Sporting da Covilhã	1–1	Marítimo	Covilhã
14:30 WET (UTC±00:00)	Moura 20'	Report	Djoussé 45'	Stadium: Estádio Municipal José dos Santos Pinto; Attendance: 668; Referee: Tiago Antunes

29 December 2016	Braga	1–2	Rio Ave	Braga
19:30 WET (UTC±00:00)	Fonte 10'	Report	Roderick 19' (pen.); Héldon 43'	Stadium: Estádio Municipal de Braga; Attendance: 6,967; Referee: Bruno Esteves

2 January 2017	Braga	4–0	Sporting da Covilhã	Braga
20:15 WET (UTC±00:00)	Horta 26', 81'; Fonte 55'; Pinho 66'	Report		Stadium: Estádio Municipal de Braga; Attendance: 3,464; Referee: Jorge Sousa

3 January 2017	Marítimo	1–0	Rio Ave	Funchal, Madeira
18:30 WET (UTC±00:00)	Sousa 89'	Report		Stadium: Estádio do Marítimo; Attendance: 5,834; Referee: João Capela

11 January 2017	Marítimo	0–1	Braga	Funchal, Madeira
20:15 WET (UTC±00:00)		Report	Velázquez 90+4'	Stadium: Estádio do Marítimo; Attendance: 9,812; Referee: Bruno Paixão

11 January 2017	Rio Ave	2–0	Sporting da Covilhã	Vila do Conde
20:15 WET (UTC±00:00)	Dias 4', 65'	Report		Stadium: Estádio dos Arcos; Attendance: 1,251; Referee: Manuel Mota

=== Group D ===
Pos	Team	Pld	W	D	L	GF	GA	GD	Pts	Qualification
1	Benfica	3	3	0	0	7	0	+7	9	Advance to knockout phase
2	Vitória de Guimarães	3	1	1	1	4	5	−1	4	
3	Paços de Ferreira	3	0	2	1	4	5	−1	2	
4	Vizela	3	0	1	2	3	8	−5	1	

Source: LPFP
Rules for classification: Tiebreakers

29 December 2016	Benfica	1–0	Paços de Ferreira	Lisbon
21:15 WET (UTC±00:00)	Cervi 39'	Report		Stadium: Estádio da Luz; Attendance: 32,945; Referee: Fábio Veríssimo

30 December 2016	Vizela	1–2	Vitória de Guimarães	Vizela
19:15 WET (UTC±00:00)	Elízio 26'	Report	Hernâni 31'; Hurtado 90+3'	Stadium: Estádio do FC Vizela; Attendance: 3,878; Referee: Artur Soares Dias

3 January 2017	Vitória de Guimarães	2–2	Paços de Ferreira	Guimarães
17:15 WET (UTC±00:00)	Texeira 59'; Zungu 90+3'	Report	Gleison 18'; Mateus 48'	Stadium: Estádio D. Afonso Henriques; Attendance: 3,962; Referee: Hélder Malheiro

3 January 2017	Benfica	4–0	Vizela	Lisbon
19:15 WET (UTC±00:00)	Mitroglou 27'; López 48'; Jonas 57', 60'	Report		Stadium: Estádio da Luz; Attendance: 18,472; Referee: Manuel Oliveira

10 January 2017	Paços de Ferreira	2–2	Vizela	Paços de Ferreira
19:15 WET (UTC±00:00)	Welthon 82', 86'	Report	Ronaldo 20'; Okoli 77'	Stadium: Estádio Capital do Móvel; Attendance: 286; Referee: Tiago Antunes

10 January 2017	Vitória de Guimarães	0–2	Benfica	Guimarães
21:15 WET (UTC±00:00)		Report	Guedes 34', 40'	Stadium: Estádio D. Afonso Henriques; Attendance: 15,151; Referee: Carlos Xistra

== Knockout phase ==
In the knockout phase, the four teams advancing from the third round contested one-legged semi-final matches for a place in the competition final. The winners of Groups A and B played the winners of Groups C and D, respectively. The semi-finals were played on 25 and 26 January, and the final was played on 29 January 2017. All knockout phase matches were played at Estádio Algarve, in Faro/Loulé.

Semi-finals
25 January – Estádio Algarve
Vitória de Setúbal	0
Braga	3
26 January – Estádio Algarve
Moreirense	3
Benfica	1

Final
29 January – Estádio Algarve
Braga	0
Moreirense	1

=== Semi-finals ===
25 January 2017
20:45 WET (UTC±00:00)

Vitória de Setúbal	0–3	Braga
	Report	Pedro Santos 13' (pen.); Stojiljković 66'; Pinho 87'

Estádio Algarve, Faro/Loulé
Attendance: 4,127
Referee: Carlos Xistra

26 January 2017
20:45 WET (UTC±00:00)

Moreirense	3–1	Benfica
Dramé 46'; Boateng 54', 71'	Report	Salvio 6'

Estádio Algarve, Faro/Loulé
Attendance: 8,935
Referee: Tiago Martins

=== Final ===
29 January 2017
20:45 WET (UTC±00:00)

Braga	0–1	Moreirense
	Report	Cauê 45+2' (pen.)

Estádio Algarve, Faro/Loulé
Attendance: 6,713
Referee: Artur Soares Dias (Porto)
