= Pedro Ribeiro (footballer, born 1983) =

Portuguese footballer

Personal information
- Full name: Pedro Manuel Mendes Ribeiro
- Date of birth: 25 January 1983 (age 43)
- Place of birth: Paredes, Portugal
- Height: 1.85 m (6 ft 1 in)
- Position: Centre-back

Youth career
- 1992–1995: Paços Ferreira
- 1995–2002: Porto

Senior career*
Years	Team	Apps	(Gls)
2002–2005	Porto B	95	(2)
2004–2006	Porto	1	(0)
2006	→ Marco (loan)	6	(0)
2006–2009	Gil Vicente	59	(3)
2009–2011	Trofense	47	(4)
2011–2012	Belenenses	29	(0)
2012–2013	Libolo	20	(0)
2013–2017	Penafiel	125	(3)
2017–2018	Rebordosa	30	(1)
Total		412	(13)

International career
2003–2004	Portugal U20	13	(0)
2004	Portugal B	2	(0)
2004–2005	Portugal U21	12	(0)
Medal record
Men's football
Representing Portugal
UEFA European Under-21 Championship
Third place	2004 Germany
UEFA European Under-17 Championship
Winner	2000 Israel
- * Club domestic league appearances and goals

Pedro Manuel Mendes Ribeiro (born 25 January 1983 in Paredes, Porto District) is a Portuguese former professional footballer who played as a central defender.
