= Rui Sacramento =

Portuguese footballer

Personal information
- Full name: Rui Miguel Ferreira Neto Sacramento
- Date of birth: 31 January 1985 (age 41)
- Place of birth: Matosinhos, Portugal
- Height: 1.84 m (6 ft 0 in)
- Position: Goalkeeper

Youth career
- 1994–2000: Leixões
- 2000–2004: Porto

Senior career*
Years	Team	Apps	(Gls)
2004–2006	Porto B	9	(0)
2005–2006	→ Valdevez (loan)	12	(0)
2006–2008	Valdevez	35	(0)
2008–2009	Gil Vicente	7	(0)
2009–2011	Esmoriz	43	(0)
2011	Feirense	0	(0)
2011–2012	Camacha	13	(0)
2012	Cinfães	16	(0)
2012–2013	Leixões	41	(0)
2013–2017	Arouca	7	(0)
2017–2018	Gil Vicente	25	(0)
2018–2019	Cinfães	13	(0)
2019	Oliveirense	14	(0)
2019	Cova Piedade	0	(0)
2019–2020	Pedras Rubras	23	(0)
Total		258	(0)

International career
2001	Portugal U15	1	(0)
2001–2002	Portugal U17	5	(0)
2002–2003	Portugal U18	4	(0)
2003–2004	Portugal U19	9	(0)

Managerial career
- 2021: Pedras Rubras
- 2021–2023: Marinhense
- 2023: Trofense
- 2023–2024: Portosantense
- 2024–2025: Petrolina
- 2025: Marinhense
- * Club domestic league appearances and goals

Rui Miguel Ferreira Neto Sacramento (born 31 January 1985) is a Portuguese former professional footballer who played as a goalkeeper, currently a manager.

Brought up at Porto, where he was only a reserve, he played seven Primeira Liga games for Arouca, and 73 in the Segunda Liga for Gil Vicente and Leixões.

== Playing career ==
Born in Matosinhos, Sacramento joined FC Porto's youth system at the age of 15. He went on to make his senior debut with FC Porto B and C.A. Valdevez, with both teams in the third division (he also spent the 2006–07 season with Valdevez in the fourth). He was second-choice to Bruno Vale in the reserve team but was registered for European competitions and called up to the main squad for the last two group games of the UEFA Champions League in 2004–05, with Nuno Espírito Santo playing in wins against PFC CSKA Moscow and Chelsea.

From 2008 to 2013, Sacramento alternated between the Segunda Liga and the third tier, representing Gil Vicente FC, S.C. Esmoriz, C.D. Feirense, A.D. Camacha, C.D. Cinfães and Leixões SC. With the latter club, he only missed one match out of a possible 42 in the 2012–13 campaign in a third-place finish in the latter league.

Sacramento signed for newly promoted Primeira Liga side F.C. Arouca in the summer of 2013. He made his debut in the competition on 25 August, in a 1–2 home loss against G.D. Estoril Praia. In his four years at the Estádio Municipal de Arouca he was always back-up to a succession of South American goalkeepers: Cássio, Mauro Goicoechea and Rafael Bracali; nonetheless, he renewed for two more years in May 2016.

Having played 21 times for Arouca – two thirds of those appearances in cup competitions – Sacramento returned to the second tier and Gil on 22 June 2017, signing a two-year deal. Following the Barcelos club's relegation in his first season, he dropped another level to C.D. Cinfães, and subsequently represented AD Oliveirense, C.D. Cova da Piedade and F.C. Pedras Rubras.

== Coaching career ==
Sacramento began working as a manager at his final team before moving to A.C. Marinhense of the fourth tier in the summer of 2021. On 20 March 2023, the 38-year-old left a campaign for promotion to Liga 3 to become the fourth coach of the season at C.D. Trofense, aiming to avoid dropping into that league. He won 2–1 at home to S.C. Farense on his debut 12 days later, but eventually was not able to prevent relegation.

Sacramento was dismissed on 15 August 2023, as the club was immersed in a severe financial crisis. Later that year, he was appointed at C.D. Portosantense in division four.

On 11 October 2024, Sacramento became the first foreign head coach in the history of Petrolina Social Futebol Clube, of the Campeonato Brasileiro Série D. In March 2025, he returned to Marinhense.

== Managerial statistics ==
As of match played 13 August 2023

Managerial record by club and tenure
Team	From	To	Record							
Team	From	To	M	W	D	L	GF	GA	GD	Win %
Trofense	21 March 2023	15 August 2023	11	4	3	4	12	12	+0	36.36
Total			11	4	3	4	12	12	+0	36.36
