= Ousmane Dramé =

French footballer (born 1992)

Personal information
- Date of birth: 25 August 1992 (age 34)
- Place of birth: Paris, France
- Height: 1.74 m (5 ft 9 in)
- Position: Winger

Team information
- Current team: Cova da Piedade

Youth career
- 2003–2007: CFF Paris
- 2007–2010: Guingamp
- 2010–2011: Padova

Senior career*
Years	Team	Apps	(Gls)
2010–2014	Padova	31	(1)
2012–2013	→ Ascoli (loan)	9	(0)
2013	→ Lecce (loan)	2	(0)
2013–2014	→ Unione Venezia (loan)	5	(0)
2014–2016	Sporting CP	0	(0)
2014–2016	Sporting CP B	13	(6)
2016–2018	Moreirense	34	(1)
2018–2019	Belenenses	6	(0)
2019–	Cova da Piedade	0	(0)
- * Club domestic league appearances and goals as of 18:37, 24 October 2019 (UTC)

Ousmane Dramé (born 25 August 1992) is a French footballer who plays as a winger for Portuguese club C.D. Cova da Piedade.

== Career ==
=== Early career ===
Of Malian descent, Dramé began his career playing for the Centre de Formation de Paris, a youth sporting club designed to cater only to football players under the age of 19. The center has produced the likes of Jérémy Ménez and Franck Tabanou, among many others. While at the academy, Dramé was teammates with Prince-Désir Gouano, as well as defender Willy Boly. He left the center in 2007 to sign with professional club Guingamp. After three years in the club's youth academy, he was released in 2010.

=== Padova ===
After failing to earn a professional contract in France, Dramé ventured to neighboring Italy eventually securing a contract with Serie B club Padova until June 2014. After spending the first half of the 2010–11 season playing in the Campionato Nazionale Primavera, he was called up to the senior team for the first time by new incoming manager Alessandro Dal Canto in April 2011 for a league match against Empoli. Dramé failed to appear in the match, but made his professional debut the following week in a 3–1 win over Portogruaro appearing as a substitute. He remained a regular in the team for the rest of the campaign appearing as a substitute in all of his appearances, which included both matches against Novara in the Serie B playoffs, which Padova lost 2–1 on aggregate.

Dramé became a starter in the 2011–12 season and made his first of the campaign on 21 August 2011 in the team's 2–1 defeat to Bologna in the Coppa Italia. On 30 August, he made his professional league start against Reggina. In the match, Dramé scored his first professional goal as Padova won the match 1–0. According to his agent, Dramé's performances at club level have led to interest from English club Arsenal, as well as Serie A clubs Fiorentina and Palermo.

=== Sporting ===
In 2014, Dramé signed a contract with Sporting Clube de Portugal to be a part of their B team.

== Personal life ==
On 22 April 2013, Dramé was charged by the Italian police for stealing a purse from a prostitute and for injuring a friend of the prostitute who tried to take the purse back from Dramé.

== Career statistics ==
Appearances and goals by club, season and competition
Club	Season	League		Cup (Note: Includes Coppa Italia)		Europe		Other (Note: Includes other competitive competitions, such as the Supercoppa Italiana and Serie B playoffs)		Total	
Club	Season	Apps	Goals	Apps	Goals	Apps	Goals	Apps	Goals	Apps	Goals
Padova	2010–11	8	0	0	0	—		2	0	10	0
Padova	2011–12	23	1	2	0	—		—		25	1
Padova	Total	31	1	2	0	0	0	2	0	35	1
Career total		31	1	2	0	0	0	2	0	35	1

=== International goals ===
Scores and results list Guinea's goal tally first.

No.	Date	Venue	Opponent	Score	Result	Competition
1.	2 September 2022	Stade du 26 Mars, Bamako, Mali	Senegal	1–0	1–0 (3–5 p)	2022 African Nations Championship qualification

== Honours ==
Moreirense

- Taça da Liga: 2016–17
