= Cauê (footballer, born 1989) =

Brazilian footballer

Personal information
- Full name: Cauê Cecilio da Silva
- Date of birth: 24 May 1989 (age 37)
- Place of birth: São Paulo, Brazil
- Height: 1.86 m (6 ft 1 in)
- Position: Central midfielder

Senior career*
Years	Team	Apps	(Gls)
2006–2008	Santo André-SP		
2008–2009	Corinthians-AL		
2009	Gama	1	(0)
2010–2011	Leixões	36	(1)
2011–2012	Olhanense	29	(5)
2012–2014	Vaslui	48	(3)
2014–2015	Neftchi Baku	43	(1)
2016	Hapoel Tel Aviv	7	(0)
2016–	Moreirense	33	(2)
2017–2018	Omiya Ardija	14	(1)
2018	→ Albirex Niigata (loan)	13	(3)
2019–2020	Albirex Niigata	35	(3)
2020–2021	Belenenses SAD	12	(0)
2021	Avispa Fukuoka	10	(1)
Total		281	(20)
- * Club domestic league appearances and goals

Cauê Cecilio da Silva (born 24 May 1989), commonly known as Cauê, is a Brazilian former professional footballer who played as a central midfielder.

== Career ==
In June 2014, Cauê signed a two-year contract with Azerbaijan Premier League team, Neftchi Baku.

In January 2017, Cauê scored in the 'Taça da Liga' final helping Moreirense achieve their first major Portuguese honour.

From 2017, Cauê played for the Japanese team Omiya Ardija with which he signed a contract for two seasons.

On 15 February 2021, he returned to Japan and signed with Avispa Fukuoka.

== Career statistics ==
As of match played 1 August 2020

Appearances and goals by club, season and competition
Club	Season	League			National cup		League cup		Continental		Other		Total	
Club	Season	Division	Apps	Goals	Apps	Goals	Apps	Goals	Apps	Goals	Apps	Goals	Apps	Goals
Olhanense	2011–12	Primeira Liga	29	4	3	1	2	0	–		–		34	5
Vaslui	2012–13	Liga I	30	1	0	0	–		2	0	–		32	1
Vaslui	2013–14	Liga I	18	2	2	0	–		2	0	–		22	2
Vaslui	Total		48	3	2	0	0	0	4	0	0	0	54	3
Neftchi Baku	2014–15	Azerbaijan Premier League	25	1	4	0	–		6	0	–		35	1
Neftchi Baku	2015–16	Azerbaijan Premier League	18	0	1	1	–		1	0	–		20	1
Neftchi Baku	Total		43	1	5	1	0	0	7	0	0	0	55	2
Hapoel Tel Aviv	2015–16	Israeli Premier League	7	0	0	0	0	0	–		–		7	0
Moreirense	2016–17	Primeira Liga	33	2	0	0	4	2	–		–		37	4
Omiya Ardija	2017	J1 League	14	1	0	0	0	0	–		–		14	1
Albirex Niigata (loan)	2018	J2 League	13	3	0	0	–		–		–		13	3
Albirex Niigata	2019	J2 League	35	3	0	0	0	0	–		–		35	3
Belenenses SAD	2020–21	Primeira Liga	0	0	0	0	0	0	–		–		0	0
Career total			222	17	10	1	6	2	11	0	0	0	248	20

== Honours ==
Moreirense

- Taça da Liga: 2016–17
