= Roberto Rodrigo =

Portuguese footballer (born 1988)

Roberto
Personal information
- Full name: Roberto Porfírio Maximiano Rodrigo
- Date of birth: 28 November 1988 (age 37)
- Place of birth: Porto, Portugal
- Height: 1.81 m (5 ft 11 1/2 in)
- Position: Forward

Team information
- Current team: Chaves
- Number: 17

Youth career
- 1999–2005: Bairro do Falcão
- 2005–2007: Porto

Senior career*
Years	Team	Apps	(Gls)
2006	Porto B	1	(0)
2007–2008	São Pedro Cova		
2008	Operário	9	(2)
2008–2009	Oliveira Douro	21	(12)
2009–2011	Tirsense	56	(28)
2011–2012	Naval	41	(6)
2013–2014	Arouca	37	(9)
2014	Tosno	0	(0)
2014–2017	Arouca	40	(8)
2016–2017	→ Moreirense (loan)	22	(4)
2017–2018	Salernitana	0	(0)
2017–2018	→ Arouca (loan)	31	(9)
2018–2020	Estoril	48	(25)
2020–2021	Chaves	27	(8)
2021–2023	Penafiel	61	(22)
2023–2025	Tondela	64	(20)
2025–	Chaves	32	(12)
- * Club domestic league appearances and goals as of 20 June 2026

Roberto Porfírio Maximiano Rodrigo (born 28 November 1988), known simply as Roberto, is a Portuguese professional footballer who plays as a forward for Liga Portugal 2 club Chaves.

Mainly associated with Arouca whom he represented in three spells, he played 88 Primeira Liga matches and scored 18 goals, also for Moreirense. In LigaPro, he surpassed 275 games and 100 goals in service of six teams.

== Club career ==
Born in Porto, Roberto arrived at FC Porto at the age of 16 and made one half-hour substitute appearance for their reserves in the third division on 7 May 2006, a goalless draw against S.C. Espinho. He carried on playing no higher than that level, for several clubs. After a breakthrough 2010–11 in which he scored 19 goals for F.C. Tirsense, he signed a four-year deal with Associação Naval 1º de Maio of the Segunda Liga.

After terminating his contract with Naval due to lack of payment at the end of 2012, Roberto moved across the second tier the following January to join F.C. Arouca. He contributed three goals in 11 matches as they earned a first-ever promotion to the Primeira Liga as runners-up to C.F. Os Belenenses, followed by six more in the top flight.

In July 2014, Roberto moved abroad to FC Tosno in the Russian First Division but did not play, returning a month later to Arouca on a three-year deal. He scored six goals as the team stayed up again, including two in a 3–3 home draw against C.D. Nacional on 8 February 2015.

Roberto was loaned to fellow top-division club Moreirense F.C. in July 2016. He played four games as they won the Taça da Liga for the first time in their history, netting twice on 29 December in a 3–3 home draw with Belenenses in the group stage.

In the summer of 2017, Roberto moved abroad again to US Salernitana 1919 of Italy's Serie B but again returned immediately to Arouca, this time on loan. He scored nine times in this spell, including a brace on 17 February 2018 in a 3–1 away victory over S.C. Braga B.

Roberto cut ties with Salernitana after his year in Arouca, signing a two-year contract with second-tier G.D. Estoril Praia on 1 July 2018. His first season as a Canary was the most prolific of his professional career with 13 goals in 26 games, fourth best in the league. He followed this with 12 in 22 in his second year, including a first professional hat-trick on 3 November 2019 in a 3–1 home defeat of Académico de Viseu FC.

On 7 July 2020, Roberto agreed to a one-year deal at G.D. Chaves. He remained in the second division subsequently, with F.C. Penafiel, C.D. Tondela and Chaves. As a member of the latter club, he scored once in the 3–2 away win over U.D. Oliveirense on 12 December 2025 to become the second player to reach 100 goals in the competition after Jorge Pires.

== Honours ==
Moreirense

- Taça da Liga: 2016–17

Tondela

- Liga Portugal 2: 2024–25
