= 2019–20 C.D. Aves season =

C.D. Aves
2019–20 season
- Manager: Augusto Inácio (until 21 October); Leandro Pires (from 21 October until 13 November); Nuno Manta Santos (from 13 November)
- Primeira Liga: 18th (relegated)
- Taça de Portugal: Third round
- Taça da Liga: Second round
- Top goalscorer: League: Mehrdad Mohammadi (8); All: Welinton Júnior (10)
- Biggest win: Aves 3–0 Portimonense
- Biggest defeat: Vitoria Guimaraes 5–1 Aves; Aves 0–4 Rio Ave; Braga 4–0 Aves; Aves 0–4 Benfica
Home colours

The 2019–20 season was C.D. Aves's 90th season in existence and third consecutive season in the Primeira Liga. They also competed in the Taça de Portugal and the Taça da Liga. The team ceased to exist after this season.

== Players ==
=== First-team squad ===
Note: Flags indicate national team as defined under FIFA eligibility rules; some limited exceptions apply. Players may hold more than one non-FIFA nationality.

No.	Pos.	Nation	Player
—	GK	FRA	Quentin Beunardeau
—	GK	BRA	Raphael Aflalo
—	GK	BUL	Dimitar Sheytanov
—	GK	BRA	Fábio Szymonek
—	DF	ANG	Jonathan Buatu
—	DF	BRA	Bruno Xavier
—	DF	SEN	Oumar Diakhité
—	DF	POL	Adam Dźwigała
—	DF	POR	Bruno Morais
—	DF	CRO	Andrej Šimunec
—	DF	BIH	Adi Mehremić
—	DF	POR	Hélder Baldé
—	DF	BRA	Bruno Jesus
—	DF	POR	Afonso Figueiredo
—	DF	POR	Ricardo Mangas

No.	Pos.	Nation	Player
—	DF	BRA	Bruninho
—	DF	LUX	Eric Veiga
—	DF	CRO	Mato Miloš
—	DF	BRA	Jaílson
—	DF	CPV	Cláudio Tavares
—	MF	BRA	Claudio Falcão
—	MF	ANG	Estrela
—	MF	POR	Rúben Oliveira
—	MF	POR	Reko Silva
—	MF	FRA	Kevin Yamga
—	MF	FRA	Enzo Zidane
—	MF	COD	Aaron Tshibola
—	MF	IRN	Mehrdad Mohammadi
—	FW	EGY	Kahraba
—	FW	BRA	Peu

== Transfers ==
=== In ===
Pos.	Player	Transferred from	Fee	Date	Source
FW	(Brazil) Peu	(Brazil) Fluminense	Free	1 July 2019	
DF	(Poland) Adam Dźwigała	(Poland) Wisła Płock	Free	1 July 2019	
MF	(Iran) Mehrdad Mohammadi	(Iran) Sepahan	Free	1 July 2019	
DF	(Bosnia and Herzegovina) Adi Mehremić	(Ukraine) Karpaty Lviv	Free	5 July 2019	
MF	(France) Enzo Zidane	(Switzerland) Lausanne-Sport	Free	15 July 2019	
MF	(France) Kevin Yamga	(Italy) AC ChievoVerona	Free	22 July 2019	
FW	(Egypt) Kahraba	(Egypt) Zamalek	Undisclosed	25 July 2019	
DF	(Senegal) Oumar Diakhité	(Romania) Sepsi OSK	Free	11 January 2020	
MF	(Democratic Republic of the Congo) Aaron Tshibola	(Belgium) Waasland Beveren	Free	31 January 2020	

=== Out ===
Pos.	Player	Transferred to	Fee	Date	Source
MF	(Argentina) Luis Fariña	(Paraguay) Cerro Porteño	Free	1 July 2019	
DF	(Brazil) Jorge Fellipe	(Saudi Arabia) Damac	Free	1 July 2019	
DF	(Brazil) Rodrigo Soares	(Greece) PAOK	Free	1 July 2019	
MF	(Portugal) Vítor Gomes	(Cyprus) Omonia	Free	2 July 2019	
MF	(Brazil) Luquinhas	(Poland) Legia Warsaw	€1,000,000	4 July 2019	
FW	(Egypt) Kahraba	(Egypt) Al Ahly	Free	1 January 2020	
MF	(France) Enzo Zidane	(Spain) Almería	Free	31 January 2020	

== Pre-season and friendlies ==
Win Draw Loss

The preseason program was unveiled on 6 June 2019 with eight games to be played. The team started preparations on 26 June.

6 July 2019 Friendly	Chaves (Portugal)	2–1	(Portugal) Aves	Chaves
18:00 WEST (UTC+1)				Stadium: Estádio Municipal Eng. Manuel Branco Teixeira

10 July 2019 Friendly	Vitória de Guimarães (Portugal)	1–0	(Portugal) Aves	Figueira da Foz
18:00 WEST (UTC+1)	Correia 24'			Stadium: Centro de Estágio Rosa Náutica

13 July 2019 Friendly	Aves (Portugal)	2–1	(Portugal) Tondela	Luso
10:30 WEST (UTC+1)				Stadium: Centro de Estágios do Luso

16 July 2019 Friendly	Aves (Portugal)	2–0	(Portugal) Águeda	Luso
18:00 WEST (UTC+1)	Rodrigues 82'; Bruno Xavier 85'			Stadium: Centro de Estágios do Luso

18 July 2019 Friendly	Aves (Portugal)	5–0	(Portugal) Anadia	Luso
10:00 WEST (UTC+1)				Stadium: Centro de Estágios do Luso

20 July 2019 Friendly	Aves (Portugal)	0–0	(Portugal) Académica	Luso
10:00 WEST (UTC+1)				Stadium: Centro de Estágios do Luso

24 July 2019 Friendly	Aves (Portugal)	0–1	(Portugal) Famalicão	Vila das Aves
20:00 WEST (UTC+1)			Martins 57'	Stadium: Estádio do CD Aves

25 July 2019 Friendly	Feirense (Portugal)	1–0	(Portugal) Aves	Santa Maria da Feira
WEST (UTC+1)	Tavares 20'			Stadium: Estádio Marcolino Castro

6 August 2019 Friendly	Lusitânia (Portugal)	2–1	(Portugal) Aves
WEST (UTC+1)

== Competitions ==
=== Overall record ===
Competition	First match	Last match	Starting round	Final position	Record							
Competition	First match	Last match	Starting round	Final position	Pld	W	D	L	GF	GA	GD	Win %
Primeira Liga	11 August 2019	26 July 2020	Matchday 1	18th	34	5	2	27	24	68	−44	14.71
Taça de Portugal	19 October 2019		Third round	Third round	1	0	0	1	2	5	−3	0.00
Taça da Liga	3 August 2019		Second round	Second round	1	0	0	1	2	3	−1	0.00
Total					36	5	2	29	28	76	−48	13.89

Source: [ Soccerway]

=== Primeira Liga ===
==== League table ====
Pos	Team	Pld	W	D	L	GF	GA	GD	Pts	Qualification or relegation
14	Tondela	34	9	9	16	30	44	−14	36	
15	Belenenses SAD	34	9	8	17	27	54	−27	35	
16	Vitória de Setúbal (R)	34	7	13	14	27	43	−16	34	Relegation to Campeonato de Portugal (Note: Vitória de Setúbal and Aves failed to produce valid licensing documentation to compete in the 2020–21 seasons of the Primeira Liga and LigaPro, respectively, so they were punished by the Portuguese Professional Football League with direct relegation to the Campeonato de Portugal. As a result, Portimonense (17th place) were invited to remain in the top tier for the 2020–21 season.)
17	Portimonense	34	7	12	15	30	45	−15	33	
18	Aves (R)	34	5	2	27	24	68	−44	17	Left the league system in May 2023

Source: Liga Portugal
Rules for classification: 1) Points; 2) Head-to-head points; 3) Head-to-head goal difference; 4) Head-to-head away goals scored; 5) Goal difference; 6) Matches won; 7) Goals scored; 8) Play-off.
(R) Relegated

==== Results summary ====
Overall								Home						Away					
Pld	W	D	L	GF	GA	GD	Pts	W	D	L	GF	GA	GD	W	D	L	GF	GA	GD
34	5	2	27	24	68	−44	17	4	1	12	12	26	−14	1	1	15	12	42	−30

==== Results by round ====
Round	1	2	3	4	5	6	7	8	9	10	11	12	13	14	15	16	17	18	19	20	21	22	23	24	25	26	27	28	29	30	31	32	33	34
Ground	A	H	A	H	A	A	H	A	H	A	H	A	H	A	H	A	H	H	A	H	A	H	H	A	H	A	H	A	H	A	H	A	H	A
Result	L	W	L	L	L	L	L	L	L	L	L	L	W	L	L	L	W	L	W	L	D	L	L	L	L	L	D	L	L	L	W	L	L	L
Position	14	7	14	15	17	18	18	18	18	18	18	18	18	18	18	18	18	18	18	18	18	18	18	18	18	18	18	18	18	18	18	18	18	18

A = Away; H = Home; W = Win; D = Draw; L = Loss

==== Matches ====
11 August 2019 1	Boavista	2–1	Aves	Porto
16:00 WEST (UTC+1)	Njie 6'; Costa 76' (pen.)		Mohammadi 41'	Stadium: Estádio do Bessa; Referee: Hélder Malheiro

18 August 2019 2	Aves	3–1	Marítimo	Vila das Aves
16:00 WEST (UTC+1)	Macedo 5'; Mohammadi 44' (pen.); Welinton Júnior 50'		Cley 38'	Stadium: Estádio do CD Aves; Referee: Jorge de Sousa

23 August 2019 3	Rio Ave	5–1	Aves	Vila do Conde
21:15 WEST (UTC+1)	Taremi 10', 22', 52'; Filipe Augusto 55'; Santos 75' (pen.)		Zidane 77'	Stadium: Estádio dos Arcos; Referee: Fábio Veríssimo

31 August 2019 4	Aves	2–3	Famalicão	Vila das Aves
16:30 WEST (UTC+1)	Mohammadi 31'; Fernando (yellow card) 45'; Welinton Júnior (yellow card) 47'; Zidane (yellow card) 66'; Macedo (yellow card) 66'; Figueiredo (red card) 82'; Xavier (yellow card) 90'; Kahraba 90+10'		Pérez 14'; Lionn (red card) 28'; Tymon (yellow card) 38'; Martins 58' (pen.), (yellow card) 90+1'; Assunção (yellow card) 82'; Silva 86'	Stadium: Estádio do CD Aves; Referee: Luís Godinho

14 September 2019 5	Vitória de Guimarães	5–1	Aves	Guimarães
21:30 WEST (UTC+1)	Pereira 11'; Tapsoba 40'; Rochinha 69'; Pêpê 77'; Guedes 90+4'		Zidane 18'	Stadium: Estádio D. Afonso Henriques; Referee: Nuno Miguel Serrano Almeida

20 September 2019 6	Paços de Ferreira	2–1	Aves	Paços de Ferreira
20:30 WEST (UTC+1)	Tanque 59'; André Micael (red card) 41'; Diaby 82'		Welinton Júnior 59'	Stadium: Estádio da Mata Real; Referee: Cláudio Pereira

30 September 2019 7	Aves	0–1	Sporting CP	Vila das Aves
20:15 WEST (UTC+1)			Fernandes 83' (pen.)	Stadium: Estádio do CD Aves; Referee: Carlos Xistra

5 October 2019 9	Aves	0–1	Tondela	Vila das Aves
15:30 WEST (UTC+1)			Beunardeau 77' (o.g.)	Stadium: Estádio do CD Aves; Referee: João Pedro Pinheiro

26 October 2019 8	Belenenses SAD	3–2	Aves	Oeiras
15:30 WEST (UTC+1)	Licá 6', 45+3'; Mehremić 66' (o.g.)		Welinton Júnior 1', 40'	Stadium: Estádio Nacional; Referee: Cláudio Pereira

3 November 2019 10	Porto	1–0	Aves	Porto
20:00 WET (UTC±0)	Marcano 13'			Stadium: Estádio do Dragão; Referee: Hélder Malheiro

8 November 2019 11	Aves	1–2	Gil Vicente	Vila das Aves
20:30 WET (UTC±0)	Yamga 45+1'		Baraye 35', 43'	Stadium: Estádio do CD Aves; Referee: Rui Costa

30 November 2019 12	Moreirense	3–2	Aves	Moreira de Cónegos
15:30 WET (UTC±0)	Abreu 28', 45'; Vitória 72' (pen.)		Mehremić 5'; Falcão (red card) 13'; Mohammadi 60' (pen.)	Stadium: Parque de Jogos Comendador Joaquim de Almeida Freitas; Referee: Manuel Mota

7 December 2019 13	Aves	1–0	Braga	Vila das Aves
20:30 WET (UTC±0)	Mohammadi 8'			Stadium: Estádio do CD Aves; Referee: Rui Costa

14 December 2019 14	Vitória de Setúbal	1–0	Aves	Setúbal
20:30 WET (UTC±0)	Hildeberto Pereira 59'		Mohammadi (penalty missed) 52'	Stadium: Estádio do Bonfim; Referee: Vitor Ferreira

4 January 2020 15	Aves	0–1	Santa Clara	Vila das Aves
15:30 WET (UTC±0)			Cardoso 64'	Stadium: Estádio do CD Aves; Referee: Iancu Vasilica

10 January 2020 16	Benfica	2–1	Aves	Lisbon
19:00 WET (UTC±0)	Pizzi 76' (pen.); André Almeida 89'		Mohammadi 20'	Stadium: Estádio da Luz; Attendance: 50,760; Referee: Carlos Xistra

18 January 2020 17	Aves	3–0	Portimonense	Vila das Aves
15:30 WET (UTC±0)	Welinton Júnior 54'; Banjaqui 74'; Mohammadi 79'			Stadium: Estádio do CD Aves; Referee: Jorge de Sousa

26 January 2020 18	Aves	0–1	Boavista	Vila das Aves
20:00 WET (UTC±0)			Cassiano 12'	Stadium: Estádio do CD Aves; Referee: Hugo Miguel

2 February 2020 19	Marítimo	1–2	Aves	Funchal
15:00 WET (UTC±0)	Pinho 37'		Mangas 18'; Silva 62'	Stadium: Estádio do Marítimo; Referee: Vitor Ferreira

9 February 2020 20	Aves	0–4	Rio Ave	Vila das Aves
20:00 WET (UTC±0)			Taremi 21' (pen.); Morais 48' (o.g.); Tarantini 76'; Diego Lopes 90+2' (pen.)	Stadium: Estádio do CD Aves; Referee: Manuel Oliveira

16 February 2020 21	Famalicão	1–1	Aves	Vila Nova de Famalicão
20:00 WET (UTC±0)	Riccieli 90+6'		Welinton Júnior 64' (pen.)	Stadium: Estádio Municipal 22 de Junho; Referee: Artur Soares Dias

21 February 2020 22	Aves	0–2	Vitória de Guimarães	Vila das Aves
20:30 WET (UTC±0)	Welinton Júnior (penalty missed) 57'		Davidson 65'; André André 78'	Stadium: Estádio do CD Aves; Referee: Rui Costa

1 March 2020 23	Aves	1–3	Paços de Ferreira	Vila das Aves
15:00 WET (UTC±0)	Welinton Júnior 44'		Pedrinho (footballer, born 1992) 27'; Hélder Ferreira 49'; Castanheira 72' (pen.)	Stadium: Estádio do CD Aves; Referee: João Pedro Pinheiro

8 March 2020 24	Sporting CP	2–0	Aves	Lisbon
17:30 WET (UTC±0)	Šporar 62'; Vietto 67' (pen.)		Macedo (red card) 11'; Luiz Fernando (yellow card) 12' (yellow-red card) 20'	Stadium: Estádio José Alvalade; Referee: Manuel Oliveira

5 June 2020 25	Aves	0–2	Belenenses SAD	Vila das Aves
21:15 WEST (UTC+1)			Szymonek 11' (o.g.); Varela 62'	Stadium: Estádio do CD Aves; Referee: João Pedro Pinheiro

11 June 2020 26	Tondela	2–0	Aves	Tondela
21:15 WEST (UTC+1)	Ronan 11', 57'		Mangas (yellow card) 36' (yellow-red card) 46'	Stadium: Estádio João Cardoso; Referee: Rui Oliveira

16 June 2020 27	Aves	0–0	Porto	Vila das Aves
21:15 WEST (UTC+1)			Zé Luís (penalty missed) 22'	Stadium: Estádio do CD Aves; Referee: Carlos Xistra

21 June 2020 28	Gil Vicente	3–0	Aves	Barcelos
21:00 WEST (UTC+1)	Henrique Gomes 10'; Rúben Ribeiro 36'; Lino 90'			Stadium: Estádio Cidade de Barcelos; Referee: André Narciso

29 June 2020 29	Aves	0–1	Moreirense	Vila das Aves
17:00 WEST (UTC+1)			Abreu 52'	Stadium: Estádio do CD Aves; Referee: Cláudio Pereira

4 July 2020 30	Braga	4–0	Aves	Braga
21:30 WEST (UTC+1)	Fonte 49'; Horta 54'; Ruiz 83'; Paulinho 90+3'			Stadium: Estádio Municipal de Braga; Referee: Manuel Mota

8 July 2020 31	Aves	1–0	Vitória de Setúbal	Vila das Aves
21:15 WEST (UTC+1)	Mohammadi 4' (pen.); Diakhité (yellow card) 6' (yellow-red card) 74'		Nuno Valente (penalty missed) 7'; Sílvio (yellow card) 41' (yellow-red card) 80'	Stadium: Estádio do CD Aves; Referee: João Carlos Bento

14 July 2020 32	Santa Clara	3–0	Aves	Oeiras
17:00 WEST (UTC+1)	Zé Manuel 21'; Cryzan 28'; Carlos 74'			Stadium: Cidade do Futebol; Referee: Gustavo Correia

21 July 2020 33	Aves	0–4	Benfica	Vila das Aves
21:15 WEST (UTC+1)			Rafa 4'; Pizzi 52' (pen.); Ramos 87', 90+3'	Stadium: Estádio do CD Aves; Referee: António Nobre

26 July 2020 34	Portimonense	2–0	Aves	Portimão
19:30 WEST (UTC+1)	Willyan Rocha 62'; Dener 89'			Stadium: Estádio Municipal de Portimão; Referee: Hugo Miguel

=== Taça de Portugal ===
19 October 2019 Third round	Farense	5–2	Aves	Faro
17:00 WEST (UTC+1)	Fabrício Simões 14', 37'; Scheid 45+1'; Dźwigała 54' (o.g.); Fabrício 64'		Welinton Júnior 48', 88'	Stadium: Estádio de São Luís

=== Taça de Portugal ===
3 August 2019 Second round	Gil Vicente	3–2	Aves	Vila das Aves
18:00 WEST (UTC+1)	Wellington Luís (yellow card) 33'; Lima 63'; Lourency 72'; Pinto (yellow card) 83'; Kraev 90'		Welinton Júnior 53'; Peu 75'; Estrela (yellow card) 90+4'	Stadium: Estádio do CD Aves; Referee: Iancu Vasilica
