= 2018–19 G.D. Chaves season =

Chaves
2018–19 season
- President: Bruno Miguel Esteves Carvalho
- Manager: Daniel Ramos (July 2018 – December 2018); Tiago Fernandes (December 2018 – March 2019); José Mota (March 2019 – )
- Stadium: Estádio Municipal Eng. Manuel Branco Teixeira
- Primeira Liga: 16th
- Taça de Portugal: Fifth round
- Taça da Liga: Third round
- Top goalscorer: League: William (5 goals); All: William (6 goals)
- Highest home attendance: 7,783; Chaves 0-1 Benfica (27 September 2018)
- Lowest home attendance: 2,170; Chaves 0-0 Feirense (3 January 2018)
| Home colours | Away colours | Third colours |
- All statistics correct as of 19 May 2019.

The 2018–19 season is Chaves' 16th season in the top flight of Portuguese football.

== Squad ==
Last updated on 19 January 2019

| No. | Nationality | Name | Position(s) | Date of birth (age) | Previous club | Notes |
Goalkeepers
| 1 | (Portugal) | António Filipe | GK | 14 April 1985 (age 41) | (Portugal) Paços de Ferreira | |
| 13 | (Portugal) | Ricardo | GK | 6 July 1982 (age 43) | (Portugal) Porto | |
| 50 | (Brazil) | João Kuspiosz | GK | 14 October 1994 (age 31) | (Portugal) Chaves B | |
Defenders
| 2 | (Portugal) | Paulinho | RB | 13 July 1991 (age 34) | (Portugal) Braga | |
| 3 | (Portugal) | Hugo Basto | CB | 14 May 1993 (age 33) | (Portugal) Arouca | |
| 4 | (Portugal) | Nuno André Coelho | CB | 7 January 1986 (age 40) | (United States) Sporting Kansas City | |
| 15 | (Portugal) | Luís Martins | LB | 10 June 1992 (age 33) | (Portugal) Marítimo | |
| 19 | (Serbia) | Nikola Maraš | CB | 19 December 1995 (age 30) | (Serbia) Rad | |
| 22 | (Argentina) | Gastón Campi | CB | 6 April 1991 (age 35) | (Argentina) Estudiantes | |
| 23 | (Brazil) | Marcão | CB | 5 June 1996 (age 29) | (Portugal) Rio Ave | |
| 26 | (Brazil) | Djavan | LB | 31 December 1987 (age 38) | (Portugal) Braga | |
| 28 | (Portugal) | Filipe Brigues | RB | 22 May 1990 (age 36) | (Portugal) União de Leiria | |
| 31 | (Serbia) | Nemanja Ćalasan | CB | 17 March 1996 (age 30) | (Serbia) FK Bačka | |
| 32 | (Brazil) | Marlon Rangel | RB | 22 May 1996 (age 30) | (Portugal) Chaves B | |
| 33 | (Brazil) | Lionn | RB | 29 January 1989 (age 37) | (Portugal) Rio Ave | |
Midfielders
| 5 | (Portugal) | Filipe Melo | DM/CM | 3 November 1989 (age 36) | (England) Sheffield Wednesday | |
| 6 | (Brazil) | Jefferson | DM | 14 April 1994 (age 32) | (Croatia) Hajduk Split | |
| 8 | (Portugal) | Stephen Eustáquio | DM | 21 December 1996 (age 29) | (Portugal) Leixões | |
| 9 | (Armenia) | Gevorg Ghazaryan | CAM | 5 April 1988 (age 38) | (Portugal) Marítimo | |
| 12 | (Belarus) | Renan Bressan | CAM | 3 November 1988 (age 37) | (Cyprus) APOEL | |
| 16 | (Turkey) | Erdem Şen | CM | 5 January 1989 (age 37) | (Turkey) Ankaragücü | |
| 17 | (Burkina Faso) | Faissal Zangre | CM | 5 May 1997 (age 29) | (Portugal) Chaves B | |
| 20 | (Portugal) | Costinha | CAM | 5 August 1992 (age 33) | (Portugal) Vitória de Setúbal | |
| 24 | (Portugal) | João Teixeira | CAM | 6 February 1994 (age 32) | (Portugal) Vitória de Setúbal | |
| 25 | (Brazil) | Bruno Gallo | CM | 7 May 1988 (age 38) | Qatar SC | |
Forwards
| 7 | (Georgia (country)) | Avtandil Ebralidze | LW | 3 October 1991 (age 34) | (Portugal) Académico de Viseu | |
| 10 | (Brazil) | Perdigão | RW/LW | 17 July 1991 (age 34) | (Portugal) Desportivo das Aves | |
| 11 | (Brazil) | William | ST | 7 December 1991 (age 34) | (Turkey) Kayserispor | |
| 14 | (Brazil) | André Luís | CF | 9 March 1994 (age 32) | (Brazil) Figueirense | |
| 30 | (Brazil) | Niltinho | LW | 11 September 1993 (age 32) | (Brazil) CSA | |
| 47 | (Portugal) | Rúben Macedo | LW | 9 March 1996 (age 30) | (Portugal) FC Porto B | |
| 77 | (Portugal) | Mika Borges | LW | 27 June 1997 (age 28) | (Portugal) Chaves B | |
| 99 | (Brazil) | Platiny | CF | 2 October 1990 (age 35) | (Portugal) Feirense | |

== Transfers ==
=== In ===
| Pos. | Player | Signed from | Details | Date | Source |
|---|---|---|---|---|---|
| DF | (Portugal) Filipe Brigues | (Portugal) União de Leiria | Free Transfer | 6 June 2018 | |
| DF | (Portugal) Luís Martins | (Spain) Granada | Free Transfer | 10 June 2018 | |
| MF | (Brazil) David Moura | (Portugal) Vilafranquense | Free Transfer | 11 June 2018 | |
| FW | (Georgia (country)) Avtandil Ebralidze | (Portugal) Académico de Viseu | Free Transfer | 29 June 2018 | |
| MF | (Portugal) João Teixeira | (Portugal) Benfica | Free Transfer | 1 July 2018 | |
| DF | (Brazil) Marcão | (Brazil) Atlético Paranaense | Undisclosed | 4 July 2018 | |
| MF | (Armenia) Gevorg Ghazaryan | (Portugal) Marítimo | Free Transfer | 14 July 2018 | |
| MF | (Brazil) Bruno Gallo | Qatar SC | Undisclosed | 18 July 2018 | |
| FW | (Portugal) João Paredes | (Portugal) Vizela | Undisclosed | 25 July 2018 | |
| FW | (Brazil) Niltinho | (Brazil) São Caetano | Undisclosed | 8 August 2018 | |
| FW | (Brazil) André Luís | (Brazil) Figueirense | Undisclosed | 31 August 2018 | |
| DF | (Brazil) Lionn | Free agent | Free transfer | 18 September 2018 | |
| MF | (South Africa) Luther Singh | (Portugal) Braga | Loan | 27 December 2018 | |
| DF | (Portugal) Rúben Macedo | (Portugal) Porto | Loan | 28 December 2018 | |
| DF | (Serbia) Ćalasan | (Serbia) Spartak Subotica | Undisclosed | 12 January 2018 | |
| MF | (Portugal) Costinha | (Portugal) Vitória de Setúbal | €150,000 | 15 January 2019 | |
| MF | (Belgium) Erdem Şen | (Turkey) Ankaragücü | Free transfer | 15 January 2019 | |
| DF | (Argentina) Gastón Campi | (Argentina) Estudiantes | Loan | 21 January 2019 | |

=== Out ===
| Pos. | Player | Signed by | Details | Date | Source |
|---|---|---|---|---|---|
| MF | (Brazil) Tiago Galvão | Free agent | Rescind contract | 10 June 2018 | |
| DF | (Portugal) Pedro Queirós | (Portugal) Estoril | Free transfer | 11 June 2018 | |
| MF | (Portugal) João Patrão | (Portugal) Estoril | Free transfer | 12 June 2018 | |
| GK | (Portugal) Emanuel Novo | (Portugal) Varzim | Undisclosed | 14 June 2018 | |
| DF | (Brazil) Rafael Furlan | (Portugal) Estoril | Free transfer | 14 June 2018 | |
| FW | (Brazil) Davidson | (Portugal) Vitória de Guimarães | €800,000 | 22 June 2018 | |
| DF | (Portugal) Domingos Duarte | (Portugal) Sporting CP | End of loan | 30 June 2018 | |
| FW | (Brazil) Matheus Pereira | (Portugal) Sporting CP | End of Loan | 30 June 2018 | |
| FW | (Guinea-Bissau) Jorginho | (France) Saint-Étienne | End of Loan | 30 June 2018 | |
| MF | (Portugal) Pedro Tiba | (Portugal) Braga | End of Loan | 2 July 2018 | |
| MF | (Brazil) David Moura | (Portugal) Farense | Loan | 15 August 2018 | |
| FW | (Georgia (country)) Avtandil Ebralidze | (Portugal) Nacional | Rescind contract | 10 January 2019 | |
| DF | (Portugal) Filipe Brigues | (Portugal) Olhanense | Rescind contract | 10 January 2019 | |
| DF | (Brazil) Marcão | (Turkey) Galatasaray | €4,000,000 | 9 January 2019 | |
| MF | (Portugal) Stephen Eustáquio | (Mexico) Cruz Azul | €3,500,000 | 16 January 2019 | |
| DF | (Portugal) João Paredes | (Portugal) Mafra | Loan | 16 January 2019 | |
| FW | (Brazil) Perdigão | (Portugal) Boavista | Undisclosed | 22 January 2019 | |

== Pre-season and friendlies ==
Win Draw Loss

| 11 July 2018 Friendly | (Portugal) Chaves | 1–0 | (Portugal) Chaves B | Chaves, Portugal |
| 18:00 WEST (UTC+01:00) | William 13' | | | Stadium: Estádio Municipal Eng. Manuel Branco Teixeira |

| 14 July 2018 Friendly | (Portugal) Rio Ave | 2–1 | (Portugal) Chaves | Vila do Conde, Portugal |
| 10:30 WEST (UTC+01:00) | Santos 57'; Borevković 81' | | Ebralidze 9' | Stadium: Estádio dos Arcos |

| 18 July 2018 Friendly | (Portugal) Chaves | 1–0 | (Portugal) Tondela | Figueira da Foz, Portugal |
| 17:00 WEST (UTC+01:00) | Ebralidze 89' | | | Stadium: Centro de Estágios Rosa Náutica de Quiaios |

| 21 July 2018 Friendly | (Portugal) Chaves | 0–0 | (Portugal) Feirense | Figueira da Foz, Portugal |
| 10:30 WEST (UTC+01:00) | | | | Stadium: Centro de Estágios Rosa Náutica de Quiaios |

| 26 July 2018 Friendly | (Portugal) Chaves | 0–1 | (Portugal) Braga | Chaves, Portugal |
| 19:30 WEST (UTC+01:00) | | | Ricardo 90' | Stadium: Estádio Municipal Eng. Manuel Branco Teixeira |

| 1 August 2018 Friendly | (Portugal) Chaves | 0–2 | (Portugal) Braga B | Chaves, Portugal |
| WEST (UTC+01:00) | | | Paulinho 60' (o.g.); Soares 79' | Stadium: Estádio Municipal Eng. Manuel Branco Teixeira |

| 4 August 2018 Friendly | (Portugal) Chaves | 0–0 | (Spain) Sporting Gijón | Chaves, Portugal |
| 19:00 WEST (UTC+01:00) | | | | Stadium: Estádio Municipal Eng. Manuel Branco Teixeira |

| 8 September 2018 Friendly | (Portugal) Chaves | 2–2 | (Portugal) Paços de Ferreira | Chaves, Portugal |
| WEST (UTC+01:00) | Gallo 41'; Platiny 76' | Report | Wágner 11'; Douglas Tanque 79' | Stadium: Estádio Municipal Eng. Manuel Branco Teixeira |

== Competitions ==
=== Overall record ===
As of match played on 19 May 2019

Performance by competition
| Competition | Starting round | Final position/round | First match | Last match | Top scorer |
|---|---|---|---|---|---|
| Primeira Liga | —N/a | 16th | 11 August 2018 | 19 May 2019 | William (5 goals) |
| Taça de Portugal | Third round | Fifth round | 21 October 2018 | 19 December 2018 | Niltinho (2 goals) |
| Taça da Liga | Second round | Third round | 29 July 2018 | 30 December 2018 | André Luís (2 goals) |

Statistics by competition
| Competition | Pld | W | D | L | GF | GA | GD | Win% |
|---|---|---|---|---|---|---|---|---|
| Primeira Liga | 34 | 8 | 8 | 18 | 34 | 57 | −23 | 23.53 |
| Taça de Portugal | 3 | 2 | 0 | 1 | 6 | 4 | +2 | 66.67 |
| Taça da Liga | 4 | 2 | 2 | 0 | 5 | 2 | +3 | 50.00 |
| Total | 41 | 12 | 10 | 19 | 45 | 68 | −23 | 29.27 |

=== Primeira Liga ===
==== League table ====
| Pos | Team | Pld | W | D | L | GF | GA | GD | Pts | Qualification or relegation |
|---|---|---|---|---|---|---|---|---|---|---|
| 14 | Desportivo das Aves | 34 | 10 | 6 | 18 | 35 | 49 | −14 | 36 (Note: Vitória de Setúbal finished ahead of Desportivo das Aves on head-to-head goal difference: Vitória de Setúbal 2–0 Desportivo das Aves, Desportivo das Aves 2–1 Vitória de Setúbal.) | |
| 15 | Tondela | 34 | 9 | 8 | 17 | 40 | 54 | −14 | 35 | |
| 16 | Chaves (R) | 34 | 8 | 8 | 18 | 34 | 57 | −23 | 32 | Relegation to LigaPro |
| 17 | Nacional (R) | 34 | 7 | 7 | 20 | 33 | 73 | −40 | 28 | Relegation to LigaPro |
| 18 | Feirense (R) | 34 | 3 | 11 | 20 | 27 | 64 | −37 | 20 | Relegation to LigaPro |

Source: Liga Portugal
Rules for classification: 1) Points; 2) Head-to-head points; 3) Head-to-head goal difference; 4) Head-to-head away goals scored; 5) Goal difference; 6) Matches won; 7) Goals scored; 8) Play-off.
(R) Relegated

==== Results by round ====
| Round | 1 | 2 | 3 | 4 | 5 | 6 | 7 | 8 | 9 | 10 | 11 | 12 | 13 | 14 | 15 | 16 | 17 | 18 | 19 | 20 | 21 | 22 | 23 | 24 | 25 | 26 | 27 | 28 | 29 | 30 | 31 | 32 | 33 | 34 |
|---|---|---|---|---|---|---|---|---|---|---|---|---|---|---|---|---|---|---|---|---|---|---|---|---|---|---|---|---|---|---|---|---|---|---|
| Ground | A | H | A | H | A | H | A | A | H | A | H | A | H | A | H | A | H | H | A | H | A | H | A | H | H | A | H | A | H | A | H | A | H | A |
| Result | L | W | L | L | W | D | L | L | L | L | L | L | L | L | D | D | W | L | W | W | L | D | L | D | D | W | L | L | D | W | W | D | L | L |
| Position | 18 | 12 | 14 | 14 | 10 | 10 | 14 | 14 | 17 | 18 | 18 | 18 | 18 | 18 | 18 | 18 | 18 | 18 | 17 | 17 | 17 | 17 | 17 | 17 | 17 | 17 | 17 | 17 | 17 | 16 | 15 | 15 | 15 | 16 |

Updated to match(es) played on 19 May 2019. Source:
A = Away; H = Home; W = Win; D = Draw; L = Loss

==== Matches ====
| 11 August 2018 1 | Porto | 5–0 | Chaves | Porto |
| 21:00 WEST (UTC+01:00) | Aboubakar 14', 20'; Brahimi 45'; Corona 71'; Mouandilmadji 88' | Report | | Stadium: Estádio do Dragão; Attendance: 46,509; Referee: Nuno Almeida |

| 18 August 2018 2 | Chaves | 2–0 | Portimonense | Chaves |
| 16:30 WEST (UTC+01:00) | Marcão 27' (pen.); Perdigão 31' | Report | | Stadium: Estádio Municipal Eng. Manuel Branco Teixeira; Attendance: 5,240; Referee: André Narciso |

| 26 August 2018 3 | Marítimo | 2–1 | Chaves | Funchal |
| WEST (UTC+01:00) | Barrera 90'; Lucas Áfrico 90+5' | Report | William 17' | Stadium: Estádio do Marítimo; Attendance: 5,398; Referee: Tiago Martins |

| 31 August 2018 4 | Chaves | 0–1 | Braga | Chaves |
| 19:00 WEST (UTC+01:00) | | Report | Pablo 43' | Stadium: Estádio Municipal Eng. Manuel Branco Teixeira; Attendance: 5,983; Referee: Luís Godinho |

| 21 September 2018 5 | Boavista | 1–2 | Chaves | Porto |
| 20:30 WEST (UTC+01:00) | Rochinha 59' | Report | Marcão 11' (pen.); Ghazaryan 48' | Stadium: Estádio do Bessa; Attendance: 4,765; Referee: João Pinheiro |

| 27 September 2018 6 | Chaves | 2–2 | Benfica | Chaves |
| 20:15 WEST (UTC+01:00) | Ghazaryan 75', 90+4' | Report | Silva 3', 84' | Stadium: Estádio Municipal Eng. Manuel Branco Teixeira; Attendance: 7,783; Referee: João Capela |

| 5 October 2018 7 | Santa Clara | 1–0 | Chaves | Ponta Delgada |
| 17:00 WEST (UTC+01:00) | Fernando 73' | Report | | Stadium: Estádio de São Miguel; Attendance: 3,431; Referee: Claúdio Pereira |

| 27 October 2018 8 | Rio Ave | 1–0 | Chaves | Vila do Conde |
| WET (UTC±00:00) | Galeno 66' | Report | | Stadium: Estádio dos Arcos; Attendance: 2,894; Referee: Hélder Malheiro |

| 5 November 2018 9 | Chaves | 1–2 | Desportivo das Aves | Chaves |
| 21:15 WEST (UTC+01:00) | André Luís 48' | Report | Baldé 19'; Amilton 56' | Stadium: Estádio Municipal Eng. Manuel Branco Teixeira; Attendance: 2,720; Referee: Rui Costa |

| 21 November 2018 10 | Sporting CP | 2–1 | Chaves | Lisbon |
| 20:00 WEST (UTC+01:00) | Dost 23', 86' (pen.) | Report | Niltinho 81' | Stadium: Estádio José Alvalade; Attendance: 20,359; Referee: Tiago Martins |

| 2 December 2018 11 | Chaves | 0–1 | Vitória de Guimarães | Chaves |
| 17:30 WEST (UTC+01:00) | | Report | Davidson 35' | Stadium: Estádio Municipal Eng. Manuel Branco Teixeira; Attendance: 5,980; Referee: João Capela |

| 15 December 2018 11 | Chaves | 1–2 | Moreirense | Chaves |
| 15:30 WEST (UTC+01:00) | Niltinho 76' | Report | Loum 60'; Aurélio 74' | Stadium: Estádio Municipal Eng. Manuel Branco Teixeira; Attendance: 2,780; Referee: Rui Costa |

| 23 December 2018 14 | Nacional | 2–0 | Chaves | Funchal, Madeira |
| 16:00 WEST (UTC+01:00) | Róchez 35', 75' | Report | | Stadium: Estádio da Madeira; Attendance: 2,127; Referee: Vítor Ferreira |

| 3 January 2019 15 | Chaves | 0–0 | Feirense | Chaves |
| 16:00 WEST (UTC+01:00) | | Report | | Stadium: Estádio Municipal Eng. Manuel Branco Teixeira; Attendance: 2,170; Referee: Artur Soares Dias |

| 6 January 2019 16 | Vitória de Setúbal | 0–0 | Chaves | Setúbal |
| 15:00 WEST (UTC+01:00) | | Report | | Stadium: Estádio do Bonfim; Attendance: 3,205; Referee: Hugo Miguel |

| 13 January 2019 17 | Chaves | 2–1 | Tondela | Chaves |
| 17:30 WEST (UTC+01:00) | André Luís 20'; Singh 57' | Report | Tomané 90+3' | Stadium: Estádio Municipal Eng. Manuel Branco Teixeira; Attendance: 2,666; Referee: António Nobre |

| 18 January 2019 18 | Chaves | 1–4 | Porto | Chaves |
| 19:00 WEST (UTC+01:00) | Gallo 76' (pen.) | Report | Soares 24', 42', 68'; Coelho 87' (o.g.) | Stadium: Estádio Municipal Eng. Manuel Branco Teixeira; Attendance: 5,950; Referee: Nuno Almeida |

| 29 January 2019 19 | Portimonense | 0–1 | Chaves | Portimão |
| 19:00 WEST (UTC+01:00) | | Report | Costinha 38' | Stadium: Estádio Municipal de Portimão; Attendance: 2,163; Referee: André Narciso |

| 2 February 2019 20 | Chaves | 1–0 | Marítimo | Chaves |
| 15:30 WET (UTC±00:00) | Bressan 70' | Report | | Stadium: Estádio Municipal Eng. Manuel Branco Teixeira; Attendance: 2,477; Referee: Luís Godinho |

| 2 February 2019 21 | Braga | 2-1 | Chaves | Braga |
| 15:00 WEST (UTC+01:00) | Dyego Sousa 64'; Claudemir 80' | Report | Luís Martins 51' | Stadium: Estádio Municipal de Braga; Attendance: 17,362; Referee: Hugo Miguel |

| 17 February 2019 22 | Chaves | 1-1 | Boavista | Chaves |
| 17:30 WET (UTC±01:00) | Bruno Gallo 44' | Report | Fábio Espinho 60' | Stadium: Estádio Municipal Eng. Manuel Branco Teixeira; Attendance: 4,836; Referee: Manuel Oliveira |

| 25 February 2019 23 | Benfica | 4–0 | Chaves | Lisbon |
| 21:15 WET (UTC±00:00) | Rafa 19'; João Félix 37'; Seferovic 44'; Jonas 89' | Report | | Stadium: Estádio da Luz; Attendance: 46,897; Referee: Manuel Mota |

| 3 March 2019 24 | Chaves | 0-0 | Santa Clara | Chaves |
| 15:00 WET (UTC±01:00) | | Report | | Stadium: Estádio Municipal Eng. Manuel Branco Teixeira; Attendance: 3,570; Referee: Claúdio Pereira |

| 8 March 2019 25 | Chaves | 1–1 | Rio Ave | Chaves |
| 20:30 WEST (UTC+01:00) | Niltinho 81' | Report | Rúben Semedo 27' | Stadium: Estádio Municipal Eng. Manuel Branco Teixeira; Attendance: 2,990; Referee: Rui Costa |

| 17 March 2019 26 | Desportivo das Aves | 0-1 | Chaves | Vila das Aves |
| 15:00 WEST (UTC+01:00) | | Report | Maraš 10' | Stadium: Estádio do CD Aves; Attendance: 3,491; Referee: Artur Soares Dias |

| 30 March 2019 27 | Chaves | 1–3 | Sporting CP | Chaves |
| 18:00 GMT (UTC+00:00) | André Luís 60' | Report | Luiz Phellype 23', 90+11'; Bruno Fernandes 80' | Stadium: Estádio Municipal Eng. Manuel Branco Teixeira; Attendance: 6,229; Referee: Manuel Mota |

| 6 April 2019 28 | Vitória de Guimarães | 4-0 | Chaves | Guimarães |
| 18:00 WEST (UTC+01:00) | Wakaso 4'; Tozé 11'; Rochinha 36'; Guedes 81' | Report | | Stadium: Estádio D. Afonso Henriques; Attendance: 12,606; Referee: João Capela |

| 12 April 2019 29 | Chaves | 1–1 | Belenenses | Chaves |
| 20:30 WEST (UTC+01:00) | Campi 15', 28' | Report | Sasso 37'; Licá 53' | Stadium: Estádio Municipal Eng. Manuel Branco Teixeira; Attendance: 4,280; Referee: Hélder Malheiro |

| 20 April 2019 30 | Moreirense | 0–1 | Chaves | Moreira de Cónegos |
| 15:30 WEST (UTC+01:00) | | Report | Maraš 72' | Stadium: Parque Joaquim de Almeida Freitas; Attendance: 1,654; Referee: Jorge Sousa |

| 28 April 2019 31 | Chaves | 4-1 | Nacional | Chaves |
| 15:00 WET (UTC±00:00) | William 10', 22', 86'; Singh 65' | Report | João Camacho 19' | Stadium: Estádio Municipal Eng. Manuel Branco Teixeira; Attendance: 4,045; Referee: Luís Godinho |

| 4 May 2019 32 | Feirense | 4-4 | Chaves | Santa Maria da Feira |
| 15:30 WET (UTC+01:00) | Djavan 13' (o.g.); Vítor Bruno 37'; Babanco 69'; Luís Machado 76' | Report | William 10'; Maraš 59'; Platiny 73', 90+5' | Stadium: Estádio Marcolino de Castro; Attendance: 2,183; Referee: Manuel Mota |

| 12 May 2019 33 | Chaves | 1–2 | Vitória de Setúbal | Chaves |
| 15:00 WEST (UTC+01:00) | Bruno Gallo 64' | Report | Allef 6'; Frédéric Mendy 15' | Stadium: Estádio Municipal Eng. Manuel Branco Teixeira; Attendance: 7,650; Referee: Artur Soares Dias |

| 19 May 2019 34 | Tondela | 5-2 | Chaves | Tondela |
| 17:30 WEST (UTC+01:00) | Ícaro Silva 3'; João Pedro 8'; Murillo 16', 77'; Delgado 28' | Report | Platiny 38'; Maraš 45+1' | Stadium: Estádio João Cardoso; Attendance: 4,985; Referee: João Pinheiro |

=== Taça de Portugal ===
==== Third round ====
| 21 October 2018 | Juventude de Pedras Salgadas | 1–4 | Chaves | Pedras Salgadas |
| 15:00 WEST (UTC+01:00) | Miguel Lima 55' | Report | Perdigão 5'; Teixeira 33'; André Luís 59'; Ebralidze 90+3' | Stadium: Estádio da Portelinha; Attendance: 2,000; Referee: João Pinheiro |

==== Fourth round ====
| 11 25 November 2018 | Santa Clara | 1–2 | Chaves | Ponta Delgada |
| 17:00 WEST (UTC+01:00) | Cardoso 57' | Report | Platiny 25'; André Luís 29' | Stadium: Estádio de São Miguel; Referee: Rui Costa |

==== Fifth round ====
| 19 December 2018 | Desportivo das Aves | 2–0 | Chaves | Vila das Aves |
| 16:00 WEST (UTC+01:00) | Baldé 46'; Gomes 63' | | | Stadium: Estádio do CD Aves; Referee: Manuel Mota |

=== Taça da Liga ===
==== Second round ====
| 29 July 2018 | Arouca | 0–0 (3-5 p) | Chaves | Arouca |
| 17:00 WEST (UTC+01:00) | | Report | | Stadium: Estádio Municipal de Arouca; Attendance: 760; Referee: João Matos |
| | Penalties |
| | Massaia (penalty scored); Sánchez Costa (penalty scored); Kiko (penalty scored); Bertaccini (penalty missed) | | (penalty scored) Marcão; (penalty scored) Gallo; (penalty scored) Maraš; (penalty scored) Eustáquio; (penalty scored) Ghazaryan |

==== Third round ====
| Pos | Team | Pld | W | D | L | GF | GA | GD | Pts | Qualification |
|---|---|---|---|---|---|---|---|---|---|---|
| 1 | Porto | 3 | 2 | 1 | 0 | 7 | 4 | +3 | 7 | Advanced to knockout phase |
| 2 | Chaves | 3 | 2 | 1 | 0 | 5 | 2 | +3 | 7 | |
| 3 | Varzim | 3 | 1 | 0 | 2 | 5 | 8 | −3 | 3 | |
| 4 | Belenenses | 3 | 0 | 0 | 3 | 2 | 5 | −3 | 0 | |

Updated to match(es) played on unknown. Source: LPFP
Rules for classification: Tiebreakers

| 14 September 2018 | Porto | 1–1 | Chaves | Porto |
| 20:30 WEST (UTC+01:00) | Hernâni 75' | Report | Eustáquio 83' | Stadium: Estádio do Dragão; Attendance: 37,708; Referee: Vítor Ferreira |

| 18 November 2018 | Belenenses | 0–1 | Chaves | Oeiras |
| 15:00 WET (UTC±00:00) | | Report | Niltinho 49' | Stadium: Estádio Nacional; Attendance: 360; Referee: Manuel Oliveira |

| 30 December 2018 | Chaves | 3–1 | Varzim | Chaves |
| 17:00 WET (UTC±00:00) | Niltinho 34'; William 70'; Marcão 76' | Report | Ruster 37' | Stadium: Estádio Municipal de Chaves; Attendance: 2,780; Referee: João Pinheiro |

== Player statistics ==
| No. | Pos. | Nationality | Name | Total | | Primeira Liga | | Taça de Portugal | | Taça da Liga | |
Goalkeepers
| 1 | GK | (Portugal) POR | António Filipe | 26 | 0 | 19 | 0 | 3 | 0 | 4 | 0 |
| 13 | GK | (Portugal) POR | Ricardo | 16 | 0 | 16 | 0 | 0 | 0 | 0 | 0 |
| 50 | GK | (Brazil) BRA | João Kuspiosz | 0 | 0 | 0 | 0 | 0 | 0 | 0 | 0 |
Defenders
| 2 | DF | (Portugal) POR | Paulinho | 26 | 0 | 22 | 0 | 3 | 0 | 1 | 0 |
| 3 | DF | (Portugal) POR | Hugo Basto | 7 | 0 | 4 | 0 | 2 | 0 | 1 | 0 |
| 4 | DF | (Portugal) POR | Nuno André Coelho | 6 | 0 | 4 | 0 | 1 | 0 | 1 | 0 |
| 15 | DF | (Portugal) POR | Luís Martins | 21 | 1 | 15 | 1 | 3 | 0 | 3 | 0 |
| 19 | DF | (Serbia) SRB | Nikola Maraš | 31 | 4 | 28 | 4 | 0 | 0 | 3 | 0 |
| 22 | DF | (Argentina) ARG | Gastón Campi | 16 | 2 | 16 | 2 | 0 | 0 | 0 | 0 |
| 26 | DF | (Brazil) BRA | Djavan | 25 | 0 | 23 | 0 | 1 | 0 | 1 | 0 |
| 31 | DF | (Serbia) SRB | Nemanja Ćalasan | 3 | 0 | 3 | 0 | 0 | 0 | 0 | 0 |
| 32 | DF | (Brazil) BRA | Marlon Rangel | 1 | 0 | 1 | 0 | 0 | 0 | 0 | 0 |
| 33 | DF | (Brazil) BRA | Lionn | 14 | 0 | 12 | 0 | 1 | 0 | 1 | 0 |
Midfielders
| 5 | MF | (Portugal) POR | Filipe Melo | 8 | 0 | 5 | 0 | 0 | 0 | 3 | 0 |
| 6 | MF | (Brazil) BRA | Jefferson | 23 | 0 | 20 | 0 | 2 | 0 | 1 | 0 |
| 12 | MF | (Belarus) BLR | Bressan | 28 | 1 | 24 | 1 | 2 | 0 | 2 | 0 |
| 16 | MF | (Turkey) TUR | Erdem Şen | 6 | 0 | 6 | 0 | 0 | 0 | 0 | 0 |
| 17 | MF | (Burkina Faso) BFA | Faissal Zangre | 2 | 0 | 2 | 0 | 0 | 0 | 0 | 0 |
| 20 | MF | (Portugal) POR | Costinha | 14 | 1 | 14 | 1 | 0 | 0 | 0 | 0 |
| 24 | MF | (Portugal) POR | João Teixeira | 13 | 1 | 11 | 0 | 1 | 1 | 1 | 0 |
| 25 | MF | (Brazil) BRA | Bruno Gallo | 35 | 3 | 30 | 3 | 2 | 0 | 3 | 0 |
Forwards
| 9 | MF | (Armenia) ARM | Gevorg Ghazaryan | 20 | 3 | 19 | 3 | 0 | 0 | 1 | 0 |
| 11 | FW | (Brazil) BRA | William | 38 | 6 | 33 | 5 | 2 | 0 | 3 | 1 |
| 14 | FW | (Brazil) BRA | André Luís | 20 | 5 | 16 | 3 | 2 | 2 | 2 | 0 |
| 30 | FW | (Brazil) BRA | Niltinho | 31 | 5 | 26 | 3 | 2 | 0 | 3 | 2 |
| 47 | FW | (Portugal) POR | Rúben Macedo | 0 | 0 | 0 | 0 | 0 | 0 | 0 | 0 |
| 55 | FW | (South Africa) RSA | Luther Singh | 17 | 2 | 17 | 2 | 0 | 0 | 0 | 0 |
| 99 | FW | (Brazil) BRA | Platiny | 21 | 4 | 15 | 3 | 3 | 1 | 3 | 0 |
| 77 | FW | (Portugal) POR | Mika Borges | 4 | 0 | 2 | 0 | 1 | 0 | 1 | 0 |
Players transferred out during the season
| 28 | DF | (Portugal) POR | Filipe Brigues | 4 | 0 | 2 | 0 | 0 | 0 | 2 | 0 |
| 23 | DF | (Brazil) BRA | Marcão | 24 | 3 | 17 | 2 | 3 | 0 | 4 | 1 |
| 8 | MF | (Portugal) POR | Stephen Eustáquio | 22 | 1 | 16 | 0 | 3 | 0 | 3 | 1 |
| 7 | FW | (Georgia (country)) GEO | Avtandil Ebralidze | 18 | 1 | 12 | 0 | 2 | 1 | 4 | 0 |
| 10 | FW | (Brazil) BRA | Perdigão | 18 | 2 | 12 | 1 | 3 | 1 | 3 | 0 |

Last updated: 19 May 2019
