= List of Portuguese football transfers winter 2018–19 =

This is a list of Portuguese football transfers for the 2018–19 winter transfer window. The winter transfer window opened 1 January 2019, although a few transfers may take place prior to that date. The window closed at midnight on 1 February 2019, although outgoing transfers could have still happened to leagues in which the window is still open. Only moves involving Primeira Liga clubs are listed. Additionally, players without a club may join a club at any time.

== Transfers ==
Date	Name	Moving from	Moving to	Fee	Ref
8 October 2018	Tucka	Arouca	Esmoriz	Loan	
22 October 2018	(South Africa) Kgaogelo Sekgota	(Lithuania) Stumbras	Vitória de Setúbal	Undisclosed	
24 October 2018	João Amorim	Oliveirense	Varzim	Free	
25 October 2018	(Guinea-Bissau) Sami	Aves	Cova Piedade	Free	
30 October 2018	Mica	União da Madeira	Sporting da Covilhã	Free	
6 December 2018	(Serbia) Lazar Rosić	Braga	Nacional	Loan	
12 December 2018	(South Africa) Kermit Erasmus	Vitória de Setúbal	(South Africa) Cape Town City	Undisclosed	
12 December 2018	(Serbia) Igor Stefanović	Unattached	Arouca	Free	
14 December 2018	(Brazil) Nenê Bonilha	(Brazil) Fortaleza	Vitória de Setúbal	Loan return	
14 December 2018	(Brazil) Nenê Bonilha	Vitória de Setúbal	(Mexico) Veracruz	Undisclosed	
15 December 2018	(Brazil) Magno	(Brazil) Anápolis	Leixões	Loan	
15 December 2018	(Brazil) Zé Paulo	Académica	Leixões	Free	
20 December 2018	(Brazil) Bruno César	Sporting CP	(Brazil) Vasco da Gama	Undisclosed	
20 December 2018	(Brazil) Marcelo	Sporting CP	(United States) Chicago Fire	€500,000	
24 December 2018	(Brazil) Luiz Phellype	Paços de Ferreira	Sporting CP	€500,000	
26 December 2018	(Argentina) Óscar Benítez	(Argentina) Argentinos Juniors	Benfica	Loan return	
26 December 2018	(Argentina) Óscar Benítez	Benfica	(Mexico) Atlético San Luis	Loan	
26 December 2018	(Brazil) Erik	(Brazil) Guarani	Aves	Undisclosed	
27 December 2018	Elves	Sporting CP B	Paços de Ferreira	Loan	
27 December 2018	Rafael Barbosa	Sporting CP B	Paços de Ferreira	Loan	
27 December 2018	(Sweden) Zackarias Faour	Unattached	Leixões	Free	
28 December 2018	Rúben Macedo	Porto B	Chaves	Loan	
28 December 2018	(South Africa) Luther Singh	Braga	Chaves	Loan	
29 December 2018	(Brazil) Carlos	(Brazil) Atlético Mineiro	Vitória de Setúbal	Undisclosed	
29 December 2018	Pedro Pinto	Vitória de Setúbal	Arouca	Loan	
30 December 2018	(Brazil) Inácio	Porto B	(Brazil) Guarani	Loan	
30 December 2018	(Brazil) Lucas Marques	(Brazil) Vitória	Santa Clara	Undisclosed	
31 December 2018	(Brazil) Michel	Aves	(Brazil) Vila Nova	Loan	
1 January 2019	(Spain) David Wang	(England) Wolverhampton Wanderers	Sporting CP	Loan	
2 January 2019	(Argentina) Alan Ruiz	(Argentina) Colón	Sporting CP	Loan return	
3 January 2019	(Brazil) André Clóvis	Portimonense	Leixões	Undisclosed	
3 January 2019	(Morocco) Issam El Adoua	Aves	Al-Kuwait	Undisclosed	
3 January 2019	(Brazil) Jatobá	Sporting CP	(Brazil) Atlético Goianiense	Loan	
3 January 2019	(Brazil) Matheus Cambuci	(India) Churchill Brothers	Varzim	Undisclosed	
4 January 2019	André Dias	Mafra	Alverca	Loan	
4 January 2019	Aydan Júnio	Paços de Ferreira	Fátima	Free	
4 January 2019	(Brazil) Diego Medeiros	Paços de Ferreira	Sporting da Covilhã	Loan	
4 January 2019	(Brazil) Fernando	Santa Clara	Porto	€1.5M	
4 January 2019	(Brazil) João Magno	Braga	Real	Loan	
4 January 2019	(Cape Verde) Kukula	Leixões	Sporting da Covilhã	Undisclosed	
4 January 2019	Miguel Lázaro	Vitória de Setúbal	Alverca	Free	
4 January 2019	Ricardo Barros	Leixões	Varzim	Free	
4 January 2019	Salvador Agra	(Spain) Cádiz	Benfica	Loan return	
4 January 2019	Salvador Agra	Benfica	(Poland) Legia Warsaw	€500,000	
4 January 2019	(Brazil) Samuel	(Brazil) Coritiba	Portimonense	Undisclosed	
4 January 2019	(Japan) Shūichi Gonda	(Japan) Sagan Tosu	Portimonense	Free	
4 January 2019	(Bulgaria) Steven Petkov	(Bulgaria) Botev Plovdiv	Feirense	€150,000	
4 January 2019	Tiago Moreira	Leixões	Sporting da Covilhã	Undisclosed	
5 January 2019	(Brazil) Douglas Grolli	(Brazil) Bahia	Marítimo	Free	
5 January 2019	Filipe Ferreira	(Austria) Sturm Graz	Nacional	Loan	
5 January 2019	(Brazil) Wesley	Estoril	(Brazil) Vitória	Loan	
6 January 2019	(Egypt) Ali Ghazal	(Canada) Vancouver Whitecaps	Feirense	Free	
7 January 2019	(Australia) Dylan McGowan	(South Korea) Gangwon	Paços de Ferreira	Loan return	
7 January 2019	(Australia) Dylan McGowan	Paços de Ferreira	(Denmark) Vendsyssel	Free	
7 January 2019	(Italy) Emiliano Viviano	Sporting CP	(Italy) SPAL	Loan	
8 January 2019	Pepe	(Turkey) Beşiktaş	Porto	Free	
9 January 2019	(Brazil) Ibson	Marítimo	(Thailand) Samut Prakan City	Free	
9 January 2019	(Brazil) Marcos Antônio	Estoril	(Ukraine) Shakhtar Donetsk	Undisclosed	
9 January 2019	(Brazil) Nildo Petrolina	Aves	(Saudi Arabia) Al-Taawoun	Free	
9 January 2019	(Lithuania) Vilius Armalas	(Lithuania) Stumbras	Benfica B	Undisclosed	
10 January 2019	Andrezinho	Paços de Ferreira	Estoril	Free	
10 January 2019	(Georgia (country)) Avtandil Ebralidze	Chaves	Estoril	Free	
10 January 2019	Guga	Benfica B	(Greece) Panetolikos	Loan	
10 January 2019	(Brazil) Marcão	Chaves	(Turkey) Galatasaray	£3.15M	
10 January 2019	(Argentina) Nicolás Vélez	(Malaysia) Negeri Sembilan	Belenenses	Free	
10 January 2019	Pedro Amaral	Benfica B	(Greece) Panetolikos	Loan	
10 January 2019	(Brazil) René	(Brazil) Paraná	Marítimo	Undisclosed	
10 January 2019	(Brazil) Ruan Teles	Varzim	Marítimo	Undisclosed	
11 January 2019	Filipe Chaby	Belenenses	Sporting CP	Undisclosed	
11 January 2019	Filipe Chaby	Sporting CP	Estoril	Loan	
11 January 2019	(Scotland) Ryan Gauld	Farense	Sporting CP	Loan return	
11 January 2019	(Scotland) Ryan Gauld	Sporting CP	(Scotland) Hibernian	Loan	
12 January 2019	(Brazil) Ewerton	Portimonense	Chaves	Loan return	
12 January 2019	(Brazil) Ewerton	Chaves	(Japan) Urawa Red Diamonds	Loan	
12 January 2019	Filipe Brigues	Chaves	Olhanense	Free	
13 January 2019	(Serbia) Nemanja Ćalasan	(Serbia) Spartak Subotica	Chaves	Undisclosed	
16 January 2019	(Guinea) Ibrahima Soumah	(Lithuania) Stumbras	Vitória de Setúbal	Undisclosed	
