= 2022–23 G.D. Chaves season =

G.D. Chaves
2022–23 season
- Chairman: Bruno Carvalho
- Manager: Vítor Campelos
- Stadium: Estádio Municipal Eng. Manuel Branco Teixeira
- Primeira Liga: 7th
- Taça de Portugal: Third round
- Taça da Liga: Group stage

The 2022–23 season was the 73rd in the history of G.D. Chaves and their first season back in the top flight since 2019. The club participated in the Primeira Liga, the Taça de Portugal, and the Taça da Liga.

== Players ==
As of 24 January 2023

Note: Flags indicate national team as defined under FIFA eligibility rules; some limited exceptions apply. Players may hold more than one non-FIFA nationality.

No.	Pos.	Nation	Player
1	GK	BRA	Paulo Vítor
3	DF	POR	Nélson Monte (on loan from Dnipro-1)
5	DF	MOZ	Bruno Langa
7	FW	RSA	Luther Singh (on loan from Copenhagen)
8	MF	POR	João Mendes
10	MF	POR	João Teixeira (captain)
12	DF	POR	Sandro Cruz (on loan from Benfica)
14	MF	SEN	Sidy Sarr
16	MF	BRA	Euller
17	FW	GHA	Abass Issah
19	DF	CAN	Steven Vitória
20	FW	BRA	Juninho
21	MF	POR	Guima

No.	Pos.	Nation	Player
23	FW	ESP	Héctor Hernández
24	DF	POR	Edu Borges
26	DF	CPV	Carlos Ponck
28	FW	ESP	Jonny Arriba (on loan from Villarreal)
30	GK	POR	Gonçalo Pinto
31	GK	BRA	Rodrigo Moura
40	MF	NGR	Nwankwo Obiora
44	DF	POR	João Queirós
73	MF	POR	Benny
77	DF	CPV	João Correia
83	MF	POR	João Pedro
95	FW	BRA	Jô

=== Out on loan ===
Note: Flags indicate national team as defined under FIFA eligibility rules; some limited exceptions apply. Players may hold more than one non-FIFA nationality.

No.	Pos.	Nation	Player
—	GK	POR	Samu (at Mafra until June 2023)
—	DF	CIV	Habib Sylla (at Pedras Salgadas until 30 June 2023)
—	DF	POR	Rúben Pereira (at Trofense until 30 June 2023)
—	MF	POR	Hélder Morim (at Trofense until 30 June 2023)

No.	Pos.	Nation	Player
—	MF	AUS	Manolis Pavlis (at Pedras Salgadas until 30 June 2023)
—	FW	ANG	Picas (at Torreense until 30 June 2024)
—	FW	POR	Pedro Ribeiro (at Fafe until 30 June 2024)
—	FW	BRA	Nicolas Bernardo (at Pedras Salgadas until 30 June 2023)

== Pre-season and friendlies ==
Win Draw Loss

13 July 2022 Friendly	Chaves (Portugal)	1–1	(Portugal) Académico de Viseu	Chaves
10:30 WEST (UTC+1)				Stadium: Estádio Municipal Eng. Manuel Branco Teixeira

23 July 2022 Friendly	Arouca (Portugal)	0–0	(Portugal) Chaves	Vila Meã
10:30 WEST (UTC+1)				Stadium: Estádio Municipal de Vila Meã

== Competitions ==
=== Overall record ===
Competition	First match	Last match	Starting round	Final position	Record							
Competition	First match	Last match	Starting round	Final position	Pld	W	D	L	GF	GA	GD	Win %
Primeira Liga	7 August 2022	May 2023	Matchday 1	7th	34	12	10	12	35	40	−5	35.29
Taça de Portugal	16 October 2022		Third round	Third round	1	0	0	1	2	3	−1	0.00
Taça da Liga	22 November 2022	16 December 2022	Group stage	Group stage	3	0	1	2	3	6	−3	0.00
Total					38	12	11	15	40	49	−9	31.58

Source: Soccerway

=== Primeira Liga ===
==== League table ====
Pos	Team	Pld	W	D	L	GF	GA	GD	Pts	Qualification or relegation
5	Arouca	34	15	9	10	36	37	−1	54	Qualification for the Europa Conference League third qualifying round
6	Vitória de Guimarães	34	16	5	13	34	39	−5	53	Qualification for the Europa Conference League second qualifying round
7	Chaves	34	12	10	12	35	40	−5	46	
8	Famalicão	34	13	5	16	39	47	−8	44	
9	Boavista	34	12	8	14	43	54	−11	44	

Source: Liga Portugal
Rules for classification: 1) Points; 2) Head-to-head points; 3) Head-to-head goal difference; 4) Goal difference; 5) Matches won; 6) Goals scored; 7) Play-off.

==== Results summary ====
Overall								Home						Away					
Pld	W	D	L	GF	GA	GD	Pts	W	D	L	GF	GA	GD	W	D	L	GF	GA	GD
9	3	3	3	8	9	−1	12	0	3	1	3	4	−1	3	0	2	5	5	0

Last updated: 9 October 2022.
Source: Liga Portugal

==== Results by round ====
Round	1	2	3	4	5	6	7	8	9	10	11	12	13	14	15	16	17
Ground	H	A	H	A	H	A	A	H	A	H							
Result	L	W	D	W	D	L	L	D	W								
Position	12	9	11	6	6	10	11	11	10								

Updated to match(es) played on 9 October 2022. Source: Liga Portugal
A = Away; H = Home; W = Win; D = Draw; L = Loss

==== Matches ====
The league fixtures were announced on 5 July 2022.

7 August 2022 1	Chaves	0–1	Vitória de Guimarães	Chaves
20:30 WEST (UTC+1)		Report	Silva 45+3'	Stadium: Estádio Municipal Eng. Manuel Branco Teixeira; Referee: Manuel Oliveira

15 August 2022 2	Marítimo	1–2	Chaves	Funchal
15:30 WEST (UTC+1)				Stadium: Estádio do Marítimo

18 March 2023 25	Estoril	0–2	Chaves	Estoril
20:30	Joãozinho (yellow card) 60' (red card) 69'		Vitória 31' (pen.); Teixeira 71' (pen.)	Stadium: Estádio António Coimbra da Mota; Referee: Rui Costa

2 April 2023 26	Chaves	1–2	Braga	Chaves
15:30	Juninho 42'		Medeiros 16'; Ruiz 59'	Stadium: Estádio Municipal Eng. Manuel Branco Teixeira; Referee: Artur Soares Dias

10 April 2023 27	Gil Vicente	0–0	Chaves	Barcelos
20:15				Stadium: Estádio Cidade de Barcelos; Referee: Manuel Mota

15 April 2023 28	Chaves	1–0	Benfica	Chaves
18:00	Abass 90+4'			Stadium: Estádio Municipal Eng. Manuel Branco Teixeira; Referee: João Pinheiro

23 April 2023 29	Santa Clara	1–1	Chaves	Ponta Delgada
17:00 AST (UTC±0)	Bruno Jordão 86'		Abass 83'; Guima (yellow card) 90+1' (red card) 90+1'	Stadium: Estádio de São Miguel; Referee: Ricardo Baixinho

29 April 2023 30	Chaves	1–0	Casa Pia	Chaves
18:00	Vitória 42'			Stadium: Estádio Municipal Eng. Manuel Branco Teixeira; Referee: Carlos Macedo

8 May 2023 31	Famalicão	1–2	Chaves	Vila Nova de Famalicão
19:00				Stadium: Estádio Municipal 22 de Junho

13 May 2023 32	Chaves	2–0	Paços de Ferreira	Chaves
15:30	Obiora 52'; Teixeira 79'		Bernardo (yellow card) 33' (yellow-red card) 42'; Ribeiro (yellow card) 90+4'; Antunes (yellow card) 90+4'	Stadium: Estádio Municipal Eng. Manuel Branco Teixeira; Referee: João Pinheiro

20 May 2023 33	Arouca	1–0	Chaves	Arouca
15:30	Sylla 63' (pen.)			Stadium: Estádio Municipal; Referee: Gustavo Correia

27 May 2023 34	Chaves	1–4	Boavista	Chaves
15:30	Langa (yellow card) 19'; Hernández 46'; Teixeira (yellow card) 64'; Guima (yellow card) 66' (red card) 66'; Benny (yellow card) 67' (yellow-red card) 69'; Abass (red card) 89'		Pérez 37', (yellow card) 67'; Boženík 42', 62'; Makouta 81'	Stadium: Estádio Municipal Eng. Manuel Branco Teixeira; Referee: Hélder Carvalho
