= Aflalo =

Aflalo is a Sephardi Jewish surname historically originating in the Jewish communities of Morocco and Algeria, and predominantly occurring today in countries with large North African Jewish migrant communities, such as Israel, France, and Canada. The surname is derived from the name of a Berber village Afelilou in the Central Atlas or the Tafilalet province in southeast Morocco.

Notable people with the surname include:

- Eli Aflalo (born 1952), Israeli politician
- Kobi Aflalo (born 1976), Israeli pop singer
- Raphael Aflalo (born 1996), Brazilian footballer
- Valerie Aflalo (born 1976), Swedish model, beauty pageant winner, and fashion designer

== See also ==
- Arron Afflalo (born 1985), American basketball player
- Alain Afflelou, (born 1948), French optometrist and businessman, born in Algeria

== Sources ==
- Eve H. and Heinrich Walter Guggenheimer - Jewish Family Names and Their Origin, Ktav Publishers House, 1992 p. 11

== Links ==
- Alexander Beider - Jews of Berber origin:Myth or Reality? Hamsa - Journal of Judaic and Islamic Studies 3/2017
