= Tarantino (disambiguation) =

Quentin Tarantino (born 1963) is an American filmmaker.

Tarantino may also refer to:

- Tarantino dialect, a transitional language associated with the Italian region of Apulia
- Tarantino (surname)
- "Tarantino" (song), a 2026 song by Lisa
