= Derner =

Derner is a German surname of multiple origins. Notable people with the surname include:

- Gordon Derner (1915–1983), American psychologist
- Lukáš Derner (born 1983), Czech ice hockey player

== See also ==
- Berner
- Dener
- Dermer
