= Platiny =

Brazilian footballer

Personal information
- Full name: Higor Inácio Platiny de Oliveira Rodrigues
- Date of birth: 2 October 1990 (age 36)
- Place of birth: Goiânia, Brazil
- Height: 1.78 m (5 ft 10 in)
- Position: Forward

Team information
- Current team: Paços de Ferreira
- Number: 99

Youth career
- 2008: Monte Cristo EC

Senior career*
Years	Team	Apps	(Gls)
2011	Inhumas EC		
2012	Grêmio Anápolis		
2012	Colinas		
2012−2013	Feirense	27	(9)
2013−2014	Braga B	18	(1)
2014−2015	Grêmio Anápolis	0	(0)
2014−2015	→ Aves (loan)	36	(8)
2015−2017	Feirense	63	(23)
2017−2020	Chaves	57	(13)
2020–2021	Casa Pia	13	(2)
2021	Feirense	17	(6)
2021–2022	Chaves	29	(6)
2022–2023	Moreirense	27	(7)
2023–2024	Marítimo	34	(8)
2024–2025	Chaves	19	(2)
2025–2026	Lusitânia	11	(1)
2026–	Paços de Ferreira	5	(2)
- * Club domestic league appearances and goals as of 13 September 2026

Higor Inácio Platiny de Oliveira Rodrigues (born 2 October 1990), known as Platiny, is a Brazilian professional footballer who plays as a forward for Portuguese Liga 3 club Paços de Ferreira.

== Career ==
Born in Goiânia, Platiny started in Monte Cristo EC, in the Brazilian regional leagues. After three seasons competing in Brazil, on 29 August 2012, Platiny joined Portuguese side Feirense on a one-year deal.

In his debut professional season, he scored 9 goals, being the team fourth highest goalscorer, with one less than the top three. His performances attracted interest from larger clubs, signing with S.C. Braga in late June 2013, spending one season competing in their B-team.

A year later, Platiny joined Aves, on a loan deal from Grêmio Anápolis, scoring eight goals in over 30 caps at Vila das Aves. On 21 July 2015, he returned to Feirense for a second-spell. His performances there, earned him accolades for Segunda Liga Player of the Month in February 2016, and with 17 goals, he finished runner-up in the scoring charts, helping Feirense return to the Primeira Liga. After two years with Feirense, Platiny moved to Chaves.

On 5 August 2022, Platiny signed a one-year contract with recently-relegated to the Liga Portugal 2 club Moreirense.

On 25 June 2023, he signed for Marítimo, who had just been relegated to the Liga Portugal 2, on a one-year deal. On 25 July 2024, Platiny returned to Chaves, now competing in Liga Portugal 2.

On 3 December 2025, after spending five months as a free agent, Platiny joined Liga Portugal 2 side Lusitânia de Lourosa. Four days later, on his debut for the club, he came off the bench to score an extra-time winner in a 3−2 league victory over Portimonense.

== Career statistics ==
As of match played 7 December 2025

Appearances and goals by club, season and competition
Club	Season	League			National cup		League cup		Other		Total	
Club	Season	Division	Apps	Goals	Apps	Goals	Apps	Goals	Apps	Goals	Apps	Goals
Feirense	2012–13	Segunda Liga	27	9	3	1	0	0	—		30	10
Braga B	2013–14	Segunda Liga	18	1	—		—		—		18	1
Aves (loan)	2014–15	Segunda Liga	36	8	3	2	2	1	—		41	11
Feirense	2015–16	LigaPro	41	17	3	1	3	0	—		47	18
Feirense	2016–17	Primeira Liga	22	6	2	0	4	1	—		28	7
Feirense	Total		63	23	5	1	7	1	—		75	25
Chaves	2017–18	Primeira Liga	21	6	2	1	0	0	—		23	7
Chaves	2018–19	Primeira Liga	15	3	3	1	3	0	—		21	4
Chaves	2019–20	Primeira Liga	21	4	2	0	4	2	—		27	6
Chaves	Total		57	13	7	2	7	2	—		71	17
Casa Pia	2020–21	Liga Portugal 2	13	2	2	0	—		—		15	2
Feirense	2020–21	Liga Portugal 2	17	6	0	0	—		—		17	6
Chaves	2021–22	Liga Portugal 2	29	6	1	0	1	0	2 (Note: Appearances in 2021–22 Liga Portugal 2 promotion play-offs)	0	33	6
Moreirense	2022–23	Liga Portugal 2	27	7	3	1	3	0	—		33	8
Marítimo	2023–24	Liga Portugal 2	34	8	3	1	1	0	—		38	9
Chaves	2024–25	Liga Portugal 2	19	2	1	0	—		—		20	2
Lusitânia	2025–26	Liga Portugal 2	1	1	0	0	—		—		1	1
Career total			341	86	28	8	21	4	2	0	392	98

== Honours ==
Moreirense

- Liga Portugal 2: 2022−23

Individual

- Liga Portugal 2 Goal of the Month: December 2023
