= Nikola Maraš =

Serbian footballer (born 1995)

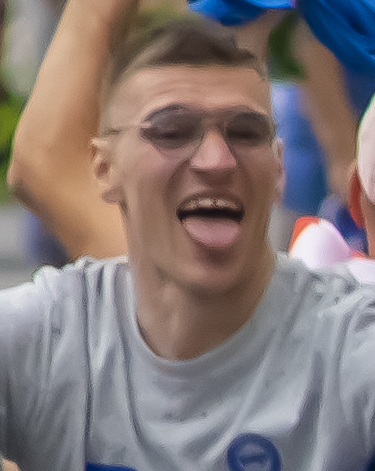
- Maraš in 2023

Personal information
- Date of birth: 19 December 1995 (age 30)
- Place of birth: Belgrade, FR Yugoslavia
- Height: 1.89 m (6 ft 2 in)
- Position: Centre-back

Youth career
- Partizan
- 2010–2013: Rad

Senior career*
Years	Team	Apps	(Gls)
2013–2017	Rad	104	(7)
2017–2020	Chaves	57	(5)
2019–2020	→ Almería (loan)	38	(2)
2020–2022	Almería	30	(1)
2021–2022	→ Rayo Vallecano (loan)	16	(0)
2022–2023	→ Alavés (loan)	20	(0)
2023–2026	Alavés	0	(0)
2024	→ Levante (loan)	8	(0)
2024–2025	→ Sporting Gijón (loan)	27	(0)
2026	→ Mirandés (loan)	7	(1)

International career^{‡}
2015	Serbia U20	3	(1)
2016–2017	Serbia U21	5	(2)
2015	Serbia U23	1	(0)
2016–	Serbia	2	(0)
- * Club domestic league appearances and goals as of 9 June 2026 ‡ National team caps and goals as of 26 June 2019

Nikola Maraš (Serbian Cyrillic: Никола Мараш, pronounced [nǐkola mǎraʃ]; born 19 December 1995) is a Serbian professional footballer who plays as a centre-back.

== Club career ==
=== Rad ===
On 26 May 2013, Maraš made his senior debut for Rad, coming on as a second-half substitute for Uroš Vitas in a 3–1 home league win over Radnički Niš. He scored his first goal for the club on 16 August 2014, giving his side a 2–1 win over Borac Čačak also at the Stadion Kralj Petar I. Over the course of the 2014–15 Serbian SuperLiga, Maraš established himself as a regular member of the team's defensive line, recording the full 90 minutes in all of his 23 appearances. He was subsequently named as the team's captain, being an undisputed starter in the following two seasons (2015–16 and 2016–17). On 5 August 2017, Maraš made his 100th league appearance for Rad in a 1–2 loss to Mladost Lučani.

=== Chaves ===
On 31 August 2017, Maraš was officially transferred to Portuguese club Chaves on a four-year deal.

=== Almería ===
On 15 August 2019, Maraš joined Spanish club Almería on a one-year loan. On 22 August of the following year, after being a regular starter, he signed a permanent four-year deal with the club.

On 31 August 2021, Maraš moved to La Liga side Rayo Vallecano on loan for the 2021–22 season.

=== Alavés ===
On 11 August 2022, Maraš moved to second division side Deportivo Alavés also in a temporary one-year deal. On 26 June 2023, after the club's promotion to the top tier, he signed a permanent four-year contract.

On 1 February 2024, after failing to make any league appearances for the first half of the 2023–24 campaign, Maraš returned to the second division after being loaned out to Levante UD. On 30 August, he moved to fellow league team Sporting de Gijón on a one-year loan deal.

On 30 January 2026, after again being without minutes at the Babazorros, Maraš was loaned to neighbouring CD Mirandés until June. On 13 August, he terminated his link with Alavés.

== International career ==
On 29 September 2016, Maraš played the full 90 minutes in Serbia's 0–3 friendly loss to Qatar. He also appeared in a 0–0 draw against the United States on 29 January 2017, playing the entire match.

== Career statistics ==
As of 26 June 2019

Appearances and goals by club, season and competition
Club	Season	League		National cup		League cup		Continental		Total	
Club	Season	Apps	Goals	Apps	Goals	Apps	Goals	Apps	Goals	Apps	Goals
Rad	2012–13	1	0	0	0	—		—		1	0
Rad	2013–14	5	0	0	0	—		—		5	0
Rad	2014–15	23	1	3	0	—		—		26	1
Rad	2015–16	34	4	0	0	—		—		34	4
Rad	2016–17	34	2	2	0	—		—		36	2
Rad	2017–18	7	0	0	0	—		—		7	0
Rad	Total	104	7	5	0	—		—		109	7
Chaves	2017–18	29	1	2	0	0	0	—		31	1
Chaves	2018–19	28	4	0	0	3	0	—		31	4
Chaves	Total	57	5	2	0	3	0	—		62	5
Almería (loan)	2019–20	38	2	1	1	0	0	—		39	3
Career total		199	14	8	1	3	0	—		210	15
