= Dejan Kerkez =

Serbian footballer

Personal information
- Date of birth: 20 January 1996 (age 30)
- Place of birth: Čelarevo, FR Yugoslavia
- Height: 1.90 m (6 ft 3 in)
- Position: Centre-back

Team information
- Current team: Ayutthaya United

Youth career
- ČSK Čelarevo

Senior career*
Years	Team	Apps	(Gls)
2012–2016	ČSK Čelarevo	66	(0)
2016–2018	Spartak Subotica	70	(4)
2016–2017	→ ČSK Čelarevo (loan)	12	(1)
2019–2021	Marítimo	18	(0)
2021	→ Mafra (loan)	0	(0)
2021–2023	Napredak Kruševac	57	(3)
2023–2025	Spartak Subotica	27	(0)
2025	FK Kauno Žalgiris	8	(0)
2026	HŠK Posušje	15	(0)
2026–	Ayutthaya United	0	(0)
- * Club domestic league appearances and goals as of 12 June 2026

Dejan Kerkez (Serbian Cyrillic: Дејан Керкез; born 20 January 1996) is a Serbian footballer who plays as a defender for Thai League 1 club Ayutthaya United.

== Club career ==
=== ČSK Čelarevo ===
Born in Novi Sad, Kerkez passed youth categories of ČSK Čelarevo and joined the first team at the age of 16. He made his first senior appearances during the 2013–14 season in the Serbian League Vojvodina. Playing for the team, Kerkez made 36 league and one cup match in a period between 2013 and 2015 and became the youngest captain in club history, promoting in the Serbian First League in summer 2015 under manager Dragan Ivanović. In 2015, he was also on trial at Eredivisie side Heerenveen. During the 2015–16 season, Kerkez made all 30 league matches, and also appeared in final match of the Vojvodina region cup. Shortly after he signed with Spartak, Kerkez returned to ČSK Čelarevo on one-year dual registration. He scored his first goal for the team in 26 fixture match of 2016–17 Serbian First League season, against Proleter Novi Sad.

=== Spartak Subotica ===
In June 2016, Kerkez signed a three-year professional contract with Serbian SuperLiga side Spartak Subotica. He made his debut for the new club in a cup match against Voždovac, played on 26 October 2016, under coach Andrey Chernyshov. He also made his SuperLiga debut replacing Đorđe Ivanović in 19 fixture match of the 2016–17 season against Novi Pazar. Kerkez scored his first senior goal in the first SuperLiga he started on the field, in 23 fixture match of the same season, against Javor Ivanjica. Kerkez started the 2017–18 Serbian SuperLiga season as a member of the first squad under coach Aleksandar Veselinović, pairing with Nemanja Ćalasan in defensive line. They also formed the youngest tandem of centre backs at the beginning of season in domestic league. Later, after Đorđe Ivanović left the club in the mid-season, Kerkez was named as a vice-captain behind club captain Vladimir Torbica. Kerkez scored his second goal for Spartak in 1–0 victory over Voždovac in the first match of the championship round in the 2017–18 Serbian SuperLiga campaign.

=== Marítimo ===
On 19 June 2019, Dejan Kerkez signed a contract with Marítimo.

==== Loan to Mafra ====
On 1 February 2021, Kerkez moved to Liga Portugal 2 side Mafra, on a loan deal until the end of the season.

=== Napredak Kruševac ===
In June 2021, he returned to Serbia and signed with Napredak Kruševac.

=== FK Kauno Žalgiris ===
On 20 February 2025 Kerkez signed with Lithuanian Kauno Žalgiris.

== Career statistics ==
As of 10 June 2019

Appearances and goals by club, season and competition
Club	Season	League			Cup		Continental		Other		Total	
Club	Season	Division	Apps	Goals	Apps	Goals	Apps	Goals	Apps	Goals	Apps	Goals
ČSK Čelarevo	2013–14	Serbian League Vojvodina	10	0	—		—		—		10	0
ČSK Čelarevo	2014–15	Serbian League Vojvodina	26	0	1 (Note: Including preliminary round match against Inđija)	0	—		—		27	0
ČSK Čelarevo	2015–16	Serbian First League	30	0	0	0	—		1 (Note: Including final round of the Vojvodina Cup against Dolina Padina)	0	31	0
ČSK Čelarevo	2016–17 (loan)	Serbian First League	12	1	1	0	—		—		13	1
ČSK Čelarevo	Total		78	1	2	0	—		1	0	81	1
Spartak Subotica	2016–17	Serbian SuperLiga	7	1	1	0	—		—		8	1
Spartak Subotica	2017–18	Serbian SuperLiga	32	1	2	0	—		—		34	1
Spartak Subotica	2018–19	Serbian SuperLiga	31	2	3	0	4	0	—		38	2
Spartak Subotica	Total		70	4	6	0	4	0	—		80	4
Career total			148	5	8	0	4	0	1	0	161	5

== Honours ==
ČSK Čelarevo

- Serbian League Vojvodina: 2014–15
