= Tarantino (surname) =

Tarantino is an Italian word meaning "originating from Taranto", a town in Apulia in Southern Italy. It is used, for example, as the demonym for Taranto and for the Tarantino dialect of the Sicilian language.

== List ==
Notable people with the surname include:

- Alexa Tarantino (born 1992), American jazz musician
- Ann Tarantino, American visual artist
- Giuseppe Tarantino (1857–1950), Italian philosopher
- Luigi Tarantino (born 1972), Italian Olympic fencer
- Javier Tarantino (born 1984), Spanish footballer
- Jevon Tarantino (born 1984), American springboard diver
- Massimo Tarantino (born 1971), Italian footballer
- Nazzareno Tarantino (born 1979), Italian footballer
- Quentin Tarantino (born 1963), American film director, screenwriter, and actor
- Ray Tarantino (born 1976), photographer and songwriter of Italian descent
- Tarina Tarantino (born 1969), American jewelry designer
- Tonette Walker (née Tarantino; born 1955), First Lady of Wisconsin
- Tony Tarantino (1940–2023), American actor, father of Quentin Tarantino

== See also ==
- Tarantini
- Tarantism
- Tarantella
- Tarantula
