= Dermer =

Dermer is a German and Yiddish surname of multiple origins. Notable people with the surname include:

- Brandon Dermer (born 1986), American film director
- Bob Dermer (born 1946), Canadian actor
- David Dermer (born 1963), American politician
- Ed Dermer (born 1957), Australian politician
- Lawrence Dermer (born 1962), American songwriter
- Richard Dermer (1939–2014), American restaurateur
- Ron Dermer (born 1971), American-born Israeli political consultant and diplomat
- Thomas Dermer (c. 1590–1620), American navigator and explorer

== See also ==
- Derner
