= João Teixeira (footballer, born 1994) =

Portuguese footballer

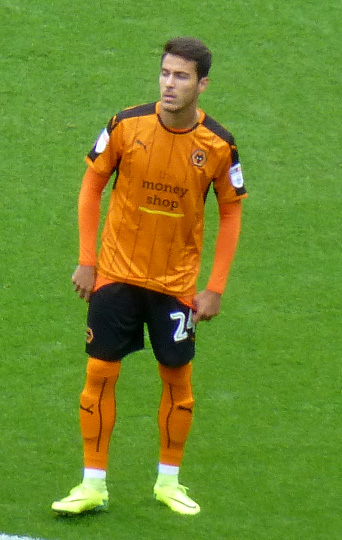
- Teixeira playing for Wolverhampton Wanderers in 2016

Personal information
- Full name: João Rafael de Brito Teixeira
- Date of birth: 6 February 1994 (age 32)
- Place of birth: Amora, Portugal
- Height: 1.78 m (5 ft 10 in)
- Position: Midfielder

Team information
- Current team: Chaves
- Number: 97

Youth career
- 2002–2005: Amora
- 2005–2013: Benfica

Senior career*
Years	Team	Apps	(Gls)
2012–2018	Benfica B	80	(6)
2014–2018	Benfica	0	(0)
2016	→ Vitória Guimarães (loan)	5	(1)
2016–2017	→ Wolverhampton Wanderers (loan)	17	(2)
2017	→ Nottingham Forest (loan)	0	(0)
2017–2018	→ Vitória Setúbal (loan)	23	(2)
2018–2023	Chaves	120	(17)
2023–2024	Al-Markhiya	12	(0)
2024	→ Rio Ave (loan)	13	(1)
2024–2025	Gil Vicente	17	(0)
2025–	Chaves	20	(1)

International career
2015	Portugal U15	2	(0)
2009	Portugal U16	9	(0)
2010	Portugal U17	14	(0)
2011	Portugal U18	6	(0)
2012	Portugal U19	17	(2)
2014	Portugal U20	5	(1)
2014–2016	Portugal U21	3	(0)
- * Club domestic league appearances and goals as of 20 June 2026

João Rafael de Brito Teixeira (born 6 February 1994) is a Portuguese professional footballer who plays as a midfielder for Liga Portugal 2 club Chaves.

He played over 150 games in Liga Portugal 2 for Benfica B and Chaves, as well as playing in the Primeira Liga for Vitória de Guimarães, Vitória de Setúbal and Chaves. He also had a brief spell in England with Wolverhampton Wanderers.

== Club career ==
=== Benfica ===
On 13 January 2013, Teixeira made his professional debut with Benfica B in a 2012–13 game against Braga B and played 84 minutes. He scored his first professional goal in a 2013–14 Segunda Liga game against Portimonense on 18 January 2014. He acted mainly as a back-up to Carlos Martins, amassing 28 games in total. He debuted for Benfica in a UEFA Champions League against Bayer Leverkusen on 9 December 2014. On 13 July 2015, he renewed his contract with Benfica until 2021.

==== Loans ====
In February 2016, Teixeira joined Vitória SC on loan for the rest of the season. He made his Primeira Liga debut on 6 March in a 2–0 loss at Académica de Coimbra as a 74th-minute substitute for Licá, and scored his first goal on 8 May in a 4–1 home win over neighbours Moreirense again from the bench. On 13 March, he was sent off before the end of the first half as his team lost by a goal to Paços de Ferreira.

On 2 August 2016, Teixeira joined Wolverhampton Wanderers of the Football League Championship on a season-long loan, making his debut four days later as a substitute in a 2–2 draw at Rotherham United. He scored his first two goals for the club on 24 September, in a 3–1 win against Brentford.

After falling out of favour with newly appointed Wolves manager Paul Lambert, Teixeira's loan with Wolves was cancelled and Benfica loaned him out to Nottingham Forest until the end of the season. He made 20 appearances and scored 2 goals in all competitions for Wolves.

For the 2017–18 season, Teixeira was loaned to Vitória FC in Portugal's top flight.

=== Chaves ===
In July 2018, Teixeira signed a permanent four-year contract with Chaves. He was sent off in the opening game of the season only six minutes after coming off the bench, for a high foot on Porto's Sérgio Oliveira in a 5–0 loss on the road; his penalty was upgraded from a yellow to red card by the video assistant referee.

Chaves were relegated in Teixeira's first season, which ended for him in April due to appendicitis. He scored his first goal for them in the second division on 21 September 2019, to open a 3–2 home loss to Covilhã. In December, he suffered a muscular injury in training, and missed some weeks of the season.

Teixeira scored twice on 26 August 2021 in a 3–0 win over Académico de Viseu and was the Liga Portugal 2 Player of the Month in January. Having scored and assisted eight goals each as Chaves won promotion in 2021–22, he made the league's Team of the Year and renewed his contract. He also scored in a 2–0 win over Moreirense in the playoffs on 21 May 2022.

=== Al-Markhiya ===
On 22 June 2023, Teixeira joined Al-Markhiya in the Qatar Stars League on a two-year contract.

==== Rio Ave (loan) ====
On 25 January 2024, Al-Markhiya sent Teixeira on loan to Primeira Liga club Rio Ave until the end of the 2023–24 season.

=== Gil Vicente ===
On 2 September 2024, Teixeira signed a one-season contract with Gil Vicente.

== International career ==
Teixeira earned 56 caps for Portugal at youth levels, starting with a 1–0 win for the under-15s against Bulgaria in Óbidos on 9 April 2009. His first goal was for the under-19s on 13 October 2012, in a 5–0 win over Israel in qualification for the 2013 UEFA European Championship; he was called up for the finals in Lithuania.

Teixeira went with the under-20s to the 2014 Toulon Tournament, in which the Portuguese came third. He scored the first goal of the tournament in a 2–0 win over Mexico on 21 May.

== Career statistics ==
As of match played 28 September 2023

Appearances and goals by club, season and competition
Club	Season	League			National cup		League cup		Continental		Other		Total	
Club	Season	Division	Apps	Goals	Apps	Goals	Apps	Goals	Apps	Goals	Apps	Goals	Apps	Goals
Benfica B	2012–13	Segunda Liga	2	0	—		—		—		—		2	0
Benfica B	2013–14	Segunda Liga	28	1	—		—		—		—		28	1
Benfica B	2014–15	Segunda Liga	37	4	—		—		—		—		37	4
Benfica B	2015–16	LigaPro	13	1	—		—		—		—		13	1
Benfica B	Total		80	6	—		—		—		—		80	6
Benfica	2014–15	Primeira Liga	0	0	0	0	0	0	1 (Note: Appearance in UEFA Champions League)	0	0	0	1	0
Benfica	2015–16	Primeira Liga	0	0	1	0	0	0	0	0	0	0	1	0
Benfica	Total		0	0	1	0	0	0	1	0	0	0	2	0
Vitória SC (loan)	2015–16	Primeira Liga	5	1	0	0	0	0	0	0	—		5	1
Wolverhampton Wanderers (loan)	2016–17	Championship	17	2	0	0	3	0	—		—		20	2
Nottingham Forest (loan)	2016–17	Championship	0	0	0	0	0	0	—		—		0	0
Vitória FC (loan)	2017–18	Primeira Liga	23	2	2	1	5	0	—		—		30	3
Chaves	2018–19	Primeira Liga	11	0	1	1	1	0	—		—		13	1
Chaves	2019–20	LigaPro	20	1	3	0	2	0	—		—		25	1
Chaves	2020–21	Liga Portugal 2	29	4	0	0	—		—		—		29	4
Chaves	2021–22	Liga Portugal 2	28	7	1	0	1	0	—		2 (Note: Appearances in Primeira Liga promotion play-offs)	1	32	8
Chaves	2022–23	Primeira Liga	32	5	1	0	2	0	—		—		35	5
Chaves	Total		120	17	6	1	6	0	—		2	1	134	19
Al-Markhiya	2023–24	Qatar Stars League	5	0	0	0	—		—		—		5	0
Career total			250	28	9	2	14	0	1	0	2	1	276	31

== Honours ==
Individual

- Cosme Damião Awards – Revelation of the Year: 2014
- Liga Portugal 2 Team of the Season: 2021–22
- Liga Portugal 2 Player of the Month: January 2022
- Liga Portugal 2 Midfielder of the Month: December 2021, January 2022, February 2022
