= Hélder Baldé =

Portuguese footballer (born 1998)

Personal information
- Full name: Hélder Bafodé Baldé
- Date of birth: 3 August 1998 (age 28)
- Place of birth: Bissau, Guinea-Bissau
- Height: 1.96 m (6 ft 5 in)
- Position: Centre back

Youth career
- 2007–2009: Sacavenense
- 2009–2012: Benfica
- 2012–2014: Sacavenense
- 2014–2015: União Leiria
- 2015: Belenenses
- 2015–2016: Casa Pia
- 2016–2017: Loures
- 2017: Benfica

Senior career*
Years	Team	Apps	(Gls)
2017–2019	Benfica B	6	(0)
2019–2021	Aves	1	(0)
2021–2022	Lugano U21	4	(0)
2023	Messina	10	(0)
2024–2025	Atlético CP	2	(0)
2025	Casarano	1	(0)

International career^{‡}
2017–2018	Portugal U19	2	(0)
2017	Portugal U20	1	(0)
- * Club domestic league appearances and goals as of 4 May 2025 ‡ National team caps and goals as of 29 April 2018

Hélder Bafodé Baldé (born 3 August 1998) is a Portuguese professional footballer who plays as a defender. Born in Bissau, he represents Portugal at international youth level.

== Club career ==
On 26 January 2023, Baldé signed with Messina in Italian third-tier Serie C.
