= Wellington Luís =

Brazilian footballer (born 1995)

Personal information
- Full name: Wellington Luís Farias da Silva
- Date of birth: 4 January 1995 (age 31)
- Place of birth: Porto Alegre, Brazil
- Height: 1.85 m (6 ft 1 in)
- Position: Goalkeeper

Youth career
- Internacional
- 2013: Novo Hamburgo
- 2013–2014: Marítimo

Senior career*
Years	Team	Apps	(Gls)
2014–2017	Marítimo B	11	(0)
2017–2018	Salgueiros	19	(0)
2018–2020	Gil Vicente	28	(0)
2021	Almería B	4	(0)
- * Club domestic league appearances and goals as of 25 April 2023

Wellington Luís Farias da Silva (born 4 January 1995) is a Brazilian footballer who plays as a goalkeeper. He previously played for Gil Vicente, Salgueiros and Marítimo.
