= Reko Silva =

Portuguese footballer

Personal information
- Full name: Miguel Gonçalves Silva
- Date of birth: 21 June 1999 (age 27)
- Place of birth: Barcelos, Portugal
- Height: 1.75 m (5 ft 9 in)
- Position: Midfielder

Team information
- Current team: Vianense
- Number: 10

Youth career
- 2007–2011: Gil Vicente
- 2011–2019: Braga
- 2014–2015: → Palmeiras (loan)

Senior career*
Years	Team	Apps	(Gls)
2019–2020	Aves	12	(1)
2020–2022	Portimonense	1	(0)
2021–2022	→ Estrela (loan)	14	(0)
2022–2023	Torreense	0	(0)
2023	Anadia	5	(0)
2023–2024	Limianos		
2024–2026	Trofense	47	(0)
2026–	Vianense	5	(1)
- * Club domestic league appearances and goals as of 12 September 2026

Miguel "Reko" Gonçalves Silva (born 21 June 1999) is a Portuguese professional footballer who plays for Liga 3 club Vianense.
