= Tarantini =

Tarantini is a surname. It may refer to:

- Alberto Tarantini (born 1955), Argentine footballer
- Gabriel Tarantini, American actor
- George Tarantini (1949–2019), American soccer coach
- Manlio Tarantini (1887–1963), Italian admiral
- Michele Massimo Tarantini (1942–2026), Italian film director
- Tarantini (Portuguese footballer), Ricardo José Vaz Alves Monteiro (born 1983)

== See also ==
- Tarantino (surname)
