= Mika Borges =

Portuguese footballer

Personal information
- Full name: Micael Filipe Correia Borges
- Date of birth: 27 June 1997 (age 29)
- Place of birth: Chaves, Portugal
- Height: 1.77 m (5 ft 9 1/2 in)
- Position: Winger

Team information
- Current team: Lusitânia Lourosa
- Number: 7

Youth career
- 2006–2014: Chaves
- 2014–2015: Casa Pia
- 2015–2016: Benfica

Senior career*
Years	Team	Apps	(Gls)
2016–2017	Varzim B	17	(5)
2017	Salgueiros	0	(0)
2017–2018	Chaves B	54	(15)
2018–2020	Chaves	2	(0)
2020–2021	Fafe	21	(3)
2021–2022	Real	23	(1)
2022–2024	Lusitânia Lourosa	58	(17)
2024–2025	Omonia Aradippou	31	(5)
2025–2026	Nea Salamis Famagusta	23	(3)
2026–	Lusitânia Lourosa	2	(1)
- * Club domestic league appearances and goals as of 14 September 2026

Micael Filipe Correia Borges (born 27 June 1997) is a Portuguese footballer who plays for Liga Portugal 2 club Lusitânia Lourosa as a forward.

== Football career ==
On 29 July 2018, Borges made his professional debut with Chaves in a 2018–19 Taça da Liga match against Arouca.
