= Pizzi =

Pizzi is a surname of Italian origin. The name refers to:

- Pizzi (Portuguese footballer), real name Luís Miguel Afonso Fernandes (born 1989), Portugal international footballer
- Angelo Pizzi (1775–1819), Italian sculptor, active in a Neoclassical style
- Antonio Pizzi (born 1946), Italian-born French chemist and wood scientist
- Becca Pizzi (born 1980), American marathon runner
- Carlo Pizzi (1842–1909), Italian painter
- Claudio E.A. Pizzi (born 1944), Italian philosopher
- Emilio Pizzi (1862–1940), Italian composer
- Fausto Pizzi (born 1967), Italian footballer
- Francesco Pizzi (born 2004), Italian racing driver
- Gabrielle Pizzi (1940–2004), Australian art dealer
- Italo Pizzi (1849–1920), Italian academic and scholar of Persian language and literature
- Ivano Pizzi (born 1982), Italian Paralympic cyclist, brother and guide of Luca Pizzi
- Juan Antonio Pizzi (born 1968), association football player and manager
- Luca Pizzi (born 1974), Italian Paralympic cyclist
- Nilla Pizzi (1919–2011), Italian singer
- Pier Luigi Pizzi (born 1930), Italian opera director and designer
- Ray Pizzi, nicknamed "Pizza Man" (1943–2021), American jazz saxophonist, bassoonist, and flautist
- Umberto Pizzi (1937–2026), Italian photojournalist
