= Luther Singh =

South African soccer player

Personal information
- Full name: Luther Wesley Singh
- Date of birth: 5 August 1997 (age 29)
- Place of birth: Noordgesig, South Africa
- Height: 1.71 m (5 ft 7 in)
- Position: Winger

Team information
- Current team: AEL Limassol
- Number: 11

Youth career
- 2008–2015: Stars of Africa

Senior career*
Years	Team	Apps	(Gls)
2015–2016	GAIS	36	(11)
2017–2021	Braga B	52	(14)
2019	→ Chaves (loan)	17	(2)
2019–2020	→ Moreirense (loan)	21	(3)
2020–2021	→ Paços Ferreira (loan)	29	(5)
2021–2023	Copenhagen	4	(0)
2022–2023	→ Chaves (loan)	22	(0)
2023–2024	Čukarički	10	(2)
2024–	AEL Limassol	65	(14)

International career^{‡}
2016–2017	South Africa U20	13	(9)
2018–2019	South Africa B	5	(2)
2019–2021	South Africa U23	9	(1)
2017–	South Africa	11	(2)
- * Club domestic league appearances and goals as of 7 November 2026 ‡ National team caps and goals as of 15 October 2026

Luther Wesley Singh (born 5 August 1997) is a South African professional soccer player who plays as a winger for Cypriot club AEL Limassol and the South Africa national team.

Prior to making his senior international debut in 2017, Singh represented the South Africa national under-20 team, with whom he won the Golden Boot award at the 2016 COSAFA Under-20 Championships and the 2017 Africa U-20 Cup of Nations.

== Club career ==
=== Early career ===
Singh is an academy graduate of the South Africa-based Stars of Africa football academy, which he joined at the age of 11 after being scouted by Farouk Khan. Through the academy, Singh was afforded the opportunity to train in Brazil at age 16, where he spent time with Vasco da Gama and Fluminense.

=== GAIS ===
Singh caught the attention of numerous clubs and in 2015 he signed with GAIS, a club based in Gothenburg, then competing in the Superettan. In his first season with GAIS, Singh was employed as a winger and netted two goals in eight league appearances before his season was cut short through injury. For the 2016 campaign, he was converted into a forward and scored the first professional hat-trick of his career on 22 May 2016, in a 7–0 win over Ängelholm. In July, the player confirmed that the Real Madrid B side and Swansea had previously been in contact with his agent, Nadim Mahmood, over a potential transfer. However, GAIS rejected these advances in a bid to hold on to Singh until his contract expired. In August 2016, Singh rejected a move to Serie A side Pescara, claiming better options would become available to him once he was a free-agent. He ultimately made 28 appearances in his final season with the club and scored 9 goals as GAIS ended the campaign in eighth place.

=== Braga ===
Following the expiration of his contract with GAIS, Singh signed with the Primeira Liga side Braga on 21 January 2017. At Braga, Singh played for the reserve side which played in the LigaPro. He scored his first goal on 15 February 2017, netting the fifth in a 5–0 win over Vizela, and ultimately scored 14 goals in 52 appearances over the next season and a half.

==== Loan to Chaves ====
In January 2019, Singh joined fellow Primeira Liga side Chaves on loan for the remainder of the season. On 3 January 2019, he made his debut for the club and was named man of the match for his performance in a 0–0 draw with Feirense. He scored his first goal in his third appearance for the club, netting the winner in a 2–1 league win over Tondela. He ultimately scored twice in seventeen appearances, but Chaves suffered relegation at the end of the campaign.

==== Loan to Moreirense ====
On 13 August 2019, he joined another Portuguese club, Moreirense, on a season-long loan.

==== Loan to Paços de Ferreira ====
On 21 September 2020, he joined another Portuguese club, Paços de Ferreira, on a loan.

=== Copenhagen ===
On 18 August 2021, Singh was picked up by perennial Danish frontrunner, F.C. Copenhagen, on a permanent transfer for an undisclosed fee. He made his debut on 22 August 2021, coming on as a substitute for Mohamed Daramy in the 80th minute of a 2–0 win over SønderjyskE. In the UEFA Europa Conference League game against PAOK on 21 October 2021, he came on as a half-time substitute but was subbed off again before the final whistle. He was heavily criticized for his performance, with Danish commentators during the game saying that "he looks like someone who ate three burgers before coming onto the pitch". He was hospitalised in November 2021 after falling ill, something his agent later attributed to depression after being subject to criticism.

Singh joined former club Chaves on a season-long loan on 24 August 2022.

Singh was released from his Copenhagen contract on 1 September 2023.

=== Čukarički ===
In 2023, Singh moved to Serbian SuperLiga side FK Čukarički. He departed the club in January 2024.

=== AEL Limassol ===
Singh signed with Cypriot First Division club AEL Limassol in 2024. He was named a vice-captain of the club for the 2026–27 season.

== International career ==
=== Under-20 ===
Singh represented South Africa at the 2016 COSAFA Under-20 Championships and scored in the nation's 8–0 win over Lesotho during the group stage. After winning all three of their group stage matches, South Africa progressed to the semi-finals, where they beat Angola 5–0, with Singh netting a hat-trick. However, South Africa lost in the final, where an assist from Singh was not enough to prevent South Africa from losing 2–1 to Zambia. At the conclusion of the tournament, Singh was awarded the Golden Boot award for his tally of five goals throughout the competition. He then represented South Africa at the 2017 Africa U-20 Cup of Nations and scored a hat-trick in the nation's opening match against Cameroon. He scored once more against Senegal before South Africa were eliminated from the competition in the semi-finals, losing out again to eventual champions Zambia. Singh's tally of four goals for the tournament, coupled with two assists, earned him the Golden Boot award and a spot in the CAF Best XI. In May 2017, Singh was named in South Africa's 21-man squad for the 2017 FIFA U-20 World Cup in South Korea.

=== South Africa B ===
In 2018, he was named in Stuart Baxter's provisional squad for the 2018 COSAFA Cup before taking part in the 2019 edition, where he scored his first international goals against Botswana and Uganda, respectively.

=== South Africa ===
Following his impressive performances at the Africa U-20 Cup of Nations, Singh was called up by interim manager Owen Da Gama to the senior national team in March 2017 for friendlies against Guinea-Bissau and Angola. Though an unused substitute in South Africa's 3–1 win over the former, he made his debut for the national team on 28 March 2017 against the latter, starting in a 0–0 draw. His first international goal for the senior national team was scored in a friendly against Namibia on 8 October 2020.

== Personal life ==
Singh is of black South African and partial Indian descent through his Punjabi Sikh grandfather. He was raised in the Noordgesig township in Soweto. His father, uncle, and cousins all played football at an amateur or semi-pro level.

== Career statistics ==
=== Club ===
As of match played 7 March 2025

Appearances and goals by club, season and competition
Club	Season	League			National cup (Note: Includes Svenska Cupen, Taça de Portugal)		League cup (Note: Includes Taça da Liga)		Europe		Other		Total	
Club	Season	League	Apps	Goals	Apps	Goals	Apps	Goals	Apps	Goals	Apps	Goals	Apps	Goals
GAIS	2015	Superettan	8	2	3	1	—		—		—		11	3
GAIS	2016	Superettan	28	9	1	0	—		—		—		29	9
GAIS	Total		36	11	4	1	—		—		—		40	12
Braga B	2016–17	Liga Portugal 2	9	1	—		—		—		—		9	1
Braga B	2017–18	Liga Portugal 2	35	11	—		—		—		—		35	11
Braga B	2018–19	Liga Portugal 2	8	2	—		—		—		—		8	2
Braga B	Total		52	14	—		—		—		—		52	14
Braga	2018–19	Primeira Liga	0	0	1	0	0	0	0	0	—		1	0
Chaves (loan)	2018–19	Primeira Liga	17	2	0	0	0	0	—		—		17	2
Moreirense (loan)	2019–20	Primeira Liga	21	3	1	0	0	0	—		—		22	3
Paços de Ferreira (loan)	2020–21	Primeira Liga	29	5	0	0	1	0	—		—		30	5
Copenhagen	2021–22	Danish Superliga	4	0	0	0	—		3 (Note: Appearance(s) in UEFA Conference League)	0	—		7	0
Chaves (loan)	2022–23	Primeira Liga	22	0	1	0	2	1	—		—		25	1
Čukarički	2023–24	Serbian SuperLiga	10	2	2	0	—		4	0	—		16	2
AEL Limassol	2024–25	Cypriot First Division	23	2	3	0	—		—		—		26	2
Career total			214	39	12	1	3	1	7	0	0	0	236	41

=== International ===
As of 30 September 2026

Appearances and goals by national team and year
National team	Year	Apps	Goals
South Africa	2017	1	0
South Africa B	2018	2	0
South Africa B	2019	3	2
South Africa	2020	4	1
South Africa	2021	3	0
South Africa	2026	3	1
Total		16	4

Scores and results list South Africa's goal tally first, score column indicates score after each Singh goal.

List of international goals scored by Luther Singh
No.	Date	Venue	Opponent	Score	Result	Competition
1	2 June 2019	Princess Magogo Stadium, KwaMashu, South Africa	Botswana	1–0	2–2 (4–5 p)	2019 COSAFA Cup
2	4 June 2019	Princess Magogo Stadium, KwaMashu, South Africa	Uganda	1–1	1–1 (4–2 p)	2019 COSAFA Cup
3	8 October 2020	Moses Mabhida Stadium, Durban, South Africa	Namibia	1–0	1–1	Friendly
4	30 October 2026	Al Salam Stadium, Cairo, Egypt	Eritrea	5–0	5–0	2027 Africa Cup of Nations qualification

== Honours ==
=== Copenhagen ===
- Danish Superliga: 2021–22

=== South Africa U23 ===
- Africa U-23 Cup of Nations third place: 2019

=== Individual ===
- 2016 COSAFA Under-20 Championships: Golden Boot
- 2017 Africa U-20 Cup of Nations: Golden Boot
- 2017 Africa U-20 Cup of Nations: Team of the Tournament
