= Bruninho (footballer, born 1993) =

Brazilian footballer

Personal information
- Full name: Bruno Felipe de Abreu Barbosa
- Date of birth: 16 December 1993 (age 32)
- Place of birth: Firminópolis, Goiás, Brazil
- Height: 1.74 m (5 ft 9 in)
- Position: Left back

Team information
- Current team: Aves
- Number: 6

Senior career*
Years	Team	Apps	(Gls)
2011	Vila Nova	2	(0)
2012–2013	Atlético Goianiense	5	(0)
2013–2014	Vila Nova	14	(0)
2014	Bragantino	2	(0)
2015	Paraná	13	(1)
2015–2016	Boa Esporte	36	(4)
2016–2017	Fortaleza	5	(0)
2018–2019	Tombense	43	(0)
2019–	Aves	4	(0)
- * Club domestic league appearances and goals as of 11 March 2021

Bruno Felipe de Abreu Barbosa (born 16 December 1993), commonly known as Bruninho, is a professional Brazilian footballer who currently plays as a left back for C.D. Aves.

== Career ==
=== Aves ===
On 28 June 2019, Bruninho joined Portuguese club C.D. Aves on a two-year contract.
