= Niltinho =

Brazilian footballer

Personal information
- Full name: Nilton Soares Rodrigues
- Date of birth: 11 September 1993 (age 33)
- Place of birth: São Paulo, Brazil
- Height: 1.71 m (5 ft 7 in)
- Positions: Left winger; left back

Youth career
- Portuguesa
- Pão de Açúcar
- Nacional-SP
- São Caetano

Senior career*
Years	Team	Apps	(Gls)
2013–2017	São Caetano	7	(0)
2014	→ União Barbarense (loan)	15	(1)
2015	→ Volta Redonda (loan)	13	(4)
2015	→ Joinville (loan)	5	(0)
2015	→ Daejeon Citizen (loan)	12	(0)
2016	→ Volta Redonda (loan)	15	(1)
2016	→ Criciúma (loan)	31	(3)
2017	→ Chapecoense (loan)	15	(3)
2017	Atlético Goianiense	19	(1)
2017–2018	São Caetano	10	(0)
2018	→ CSA (loan)	17	(2)
2018–2020	Chaves	55	(7)
2021–2022	Ponte Preta	36	(0)
2022	Náutico	10	(1)
2022–2023	Panachaiki	2	(0)
2023	Valletta	6	(0)
2023	Shkupi	11	(1)
2024	CSA	2	(0)
2024–2025	Kowloon City	10	(0)
- * Club domestic league appearances and goals as of 27 April 2025

Nilton Soares Rodrigues (born 11 September 1993), commonly known as Niltinho, is a Brazilian professional footballer who plays as a left winger.

== Club career ==
Niltinho signed for Daejeon Citizen in July 2015, and made his debut against Gwangju in a 2–1 win.

On 23 August 2024, Niltinho joined Hong Kong Premier League club Kowloon City.

== Career statistics ==
=== Club ===
As of 26 August 2017

Club	Season	League			State League		Cup		Continental		Other		Total	
Club	Season	Division	Apps	Goals	Apps	Goals	Apps	Goals	Apps	Goals	Apps	Goals	Apps	Goals
São Caetano	2013	Série B	0	0	—		0	0	—		6 (Note: Appearance(s) in Copa Paulista)	2	6	2
São Caetano	2014	Série C	7	0	—		0	0	—		—		7	0
São Caetano	Total		7	0	—		—		—		6	2	13	2
União Barbarense (loan)	2014	Paulista A2	—		15	1	—		—		—		15	1
Volta Redonda (loan)	2015	Série D	0	0	13	4	0	0	—		—		13	4
Joinville (loan)	2015	Série A	5	0	—		—		—		—		13	4
Daejeon Citizen (loan)	2015	K League Classic	12	0	—		—		—		—		13	4
Volta Redonda (loan)	2016	Série D	0	0	15	1	0	0	—		—		15	1
Criciúma (loan)	2016	Série B	31	3	—		—		—		—		31	3
Chapecoense (loan)	2017	Série A	2	0	12	3	0	0	2 (Note: Appearance(s) in Copa Libertadores)	0	2 (Note: One appearance in Primeira Liga, one appearance in Recopa Sudamericana)	0	18	3
Atlético Goianiense (loan)	2017	Série A	10	1	—		—		—		—		10	1
Career total			67	4	55	9	0	0	2	0	8	2	139	15

== Honours ==
=== Club ===
Chapecoense

- Campeonato Catarinense: 2017

=== Individual ===
- Primeira Liga Goal of the Month: October/November 2018
