= Ann Tarantino =

American visual artist

- Citizenship: American
- Occupation: Visual artist
- Known for: Abstract art
- Website: anntarantino.com

Ann Tarantino is an American visual artist known for her abstract paintings and public artwork.

Her work spans studio and public art practices, including drawing, painting, installation, and site-specific projects, with a focus on the relationship between the natural world and the built environment.

Tarantino has exhibited internationally in public settings, including installations on the streets of New York City in 2023 and at the Larnaca Biennial in Cyprus (2025). Her work has been reviewed by the The Washington Post and other media outlets. In 2017, she was awarded a Fulbright Scholar Award for artistic practice and research in Brazil.

== Early life and education ==
Tarantino was born in Massachusetts and grew up in New England. Tarantino graduated with a BA with honors in visual arts from Brown University and later earned an MFA in painting from painting from Pennsylvania State University.

From 2006 to 2022, Tarantino was a faculty member at Penn State's School of Visual Arts, and later in its Stuckeman School of Architecture and Landscape Architecture. From 2018 to 2020, she was co-lead on the Campus Arts Initiative.

== Public projects and commissions ==
- 2026: Field Trip, permanent stained glass installation for the University of Nebraska Medical Center College of Dentistry
- 2023: Terrain Park, 23 exterior streetscape murals for Downtown Brooklyn Partnership and New York City Department of Transit, Brooklyn, New York
- 2023: There You Are, permanent glass windscreens for City of Ogden, Utah Transit Authority bus rapid transit
- 2022: Whirlwinds, public mural located beneath the Westover Bridge adjacent to Hazel Ruby McQuain Park, Morgantown
- 2021: Color Block, exterior mural for Borough of State College
- 2021: Future Forward, exterior mural for State College Area School District, State College, PA
- 2019: Jump Cuts, window installation for Diamond District Association and Chashama, New York
- 2018: Flag Futures, installation for Satellite Art Show, Miami, FL
- 2018: Razzle Dazzle, traffic barrier mural for Metropolitan Transit Authority, New York, NY
- 2018: Cloud Countries, installation for Pittsburgh International Airport, Pittsburgh, PA
- 2017: Watermark, public art project commissioned by Neighborhood Allies in collaboration with the Office of Public Art, Millvale, PA

== Exhibitions (selection) ==
=== Solo ===
- 2025: Field Trip, Juniata College Museum of Art, Huntingdon, Pennsylvania
- 2020: Land Lines, Davis Editions, Phoenix, AZ
- 2020: Panoramas (with Paul Manlove), Ejecta Projects, Carlisle, PA
- 2015: Moon, Shine, Children's Museum of Pittsburgh, Pittsburgh, PA

=== Group ===
- 2025: Along Lines and Traces, Larnaca Bienniale, Larnaca, Cyprus
- 2023: Symposium, Mark Rothko Art Centre, Daugavpils, Latvia
- 2022: Outside In and Everything In Between, ArtPort Kingston, Kingston, NY
- 2018–20: Plastic Entanglements: Ecology, Aesthetics, Materials, first presented at the Palmer Museum of Art, the Pennsylvania State University, and later toured to Jordan Schnitzer Museum of Art, University of Oregon; Smith College Museum of Art; and the Chazen Museum of Art, University of Wisconsin–Madison
- 2017: Carte Blanche, Adah Rose Gallery, Kensington, Maryland
- 2016: Expanded Practice, Palmer Museum of Art, University Park, PA
