= Manolis Pavlis =

Australian association football player

Personal information
- Full name: Emmanuel Christos Pavlis
- Date of birth: 4 December 2002 (age 23)
- Place of birth: Sydney, Australia
- Height: 1.76 m (5 ft 9 in)
- Position: Forward

Team information
- Current team: Panserraikos
- Number: 27

Youth career
- 2014–2017: Sydney Olympic
- 2017–2018: Olympiacos
- 2018–2020: Panionios

Senior career*
Years	Team	Apps	(Gls)
2020–2021	Apollon Larissa	1	(0)
2021–2022	Kallithea	0	(0)
2022	Egaleo	5	(0)
2022–2023	Chaves	0	(0)
2022–2023	→ Pedras Salgadas (loan)	1	(0)
2024–2025	Leixões	1	(0)
2024–2025	Leixões U23	8	(0)
2025–2026	AEL	0	(0)
2026–	Panserraikos	0	(0)
- * Club domestic league appearances and goals as of 30 April 2025

Emmanuel Christos Pavlis (Greek: Εμμανουήλ Χρήστος Παυλής; born 4 December 2002) is an Australian professional soccer player who plays as a forward for Greek Super League club Panserraikos.
