= Jonny Arriba =

Spanish footballer

Personal information
- Full name: Jonathan Arriba Monroy
- Date of birth: 1 November 2001 (age 25)
- Place of birth: La Vall d'Uixó, Spain
- Height: 1.76 m (5 ft 9 in)
- Positions: Winger; second striker; attacking midfielder

Team information
- Current team: Feirense
- Number: 19

Youth career
- 2006–2012: Vall de Uxó
- 2012–2018: Villarreal
- 2018–2019: Roda
- 2019–2020: Villarreal

Senior career*
Years	Team	Apps	(Gls)
2019–2021	Roda	24	(6)
2021–2022	Villarreal C	33	(13)
2022–2023	Villarreal B	4	(0)
2022–2023	→ Chaves (loan)	13	(1)
2023–2025	Torreense	15	(1)
2024–2025	→ Unionistas (loan)	35	(5)
2025–	Feirense	13	(1)
- * Club domestic league appearances and goals as of 19 June 2026

Jonathan Arriba Monroy (born 1 November 2001) is a Spanish professional footballer who plays as a winger, second striker or attacking midfielder for Liga Portugal 2 club Feirense.

== Career ==
Arriba is a youth product of UD Vall de Uxó and Villarreal CF. He began his senior career with affiliate club CD Roda in Tercera División, appearing regularly before returning to Villarreal in 2021, being assigned to the C-team in Tercera División RFEF.

Arriba first appeared with the reserves on 9 January 2022, coming on as a late substitute for Diego Collado in a 2–1 Primera División RFEF away loss against Algeciras CF. Ten days later, he extended his contract with the club, and appeared in a further three matches for the B's during the campaign as they achieved promotion to Segunda División.

On 25 July 2022, Arriba moved abroad and joined Portuguese club GD Chaves on loan for the 2022–23 season. He made his professional debut on 7 August, replacing Bernardo Sousa in a 1–0 home loss to Vitória de Guimarães.

Arriba scored his first professional goal on 23 October 2022, netting Chaves' second in a 3–1 home win over Gil Vicente FC. He returned to the Yellow Submarine after his loan expired, but returned to Portugal on 31 August 2023, signing a two-year contract (with an option for a further year) for Liga Portugal 2 club Torreense.

On 30 August 2024, Arriba was loaned by Unionistas in the Spanish third tier.

On 30 June 2025, Arriba signed with Feirense in Liga Portugal 2.
