= Bruno Jesus =

Brazilian footballer (born 1997)

Personal information
- Full name: Bruno Wavzinkevicz Ribeiro
- Date of birth: 22 April 1997 (age 29)
- Place of birth: Porto Alegre, Brazil
- Height: 1.91 m (6 ft 3 in)
- Position: Defender

Youth career
- 2014–2015: São José
- 2015–2017: Grêmio

Senior career*
Years	Team	Apps	(Gls)
2017–2019	São José	30	(1)
2019–2020	Aves	1	(0)
2020–2023	São José	60	(1)
2022	→ Passo Fundo (loan)		
- * Club domestic league appearances and goals as of 8 October 2023

Bruno Wavzinkevicz Ribeiro (born 22 April 1997), known as Bruno Jesus, is a Brazilian professional footballer who plays as a defender.

== Career ==
Jesus made his professional debut with Esporte Clube São José in a 2–0 Campeonato Gaúcho win over Grêmio on 28 January 2018. On 2 August 2019, Jesus signed with Aves in the Portuguese Primeira Liga.

== Personal life ==
Born in Brazil, Bruno Jesus is of Polish descent.
