= Estádio do CD Aves =

Stadium in Vila das Aves, Portugal

Coordinates: 41.366932°N 8.411789°W

Estádio do CD das Aves
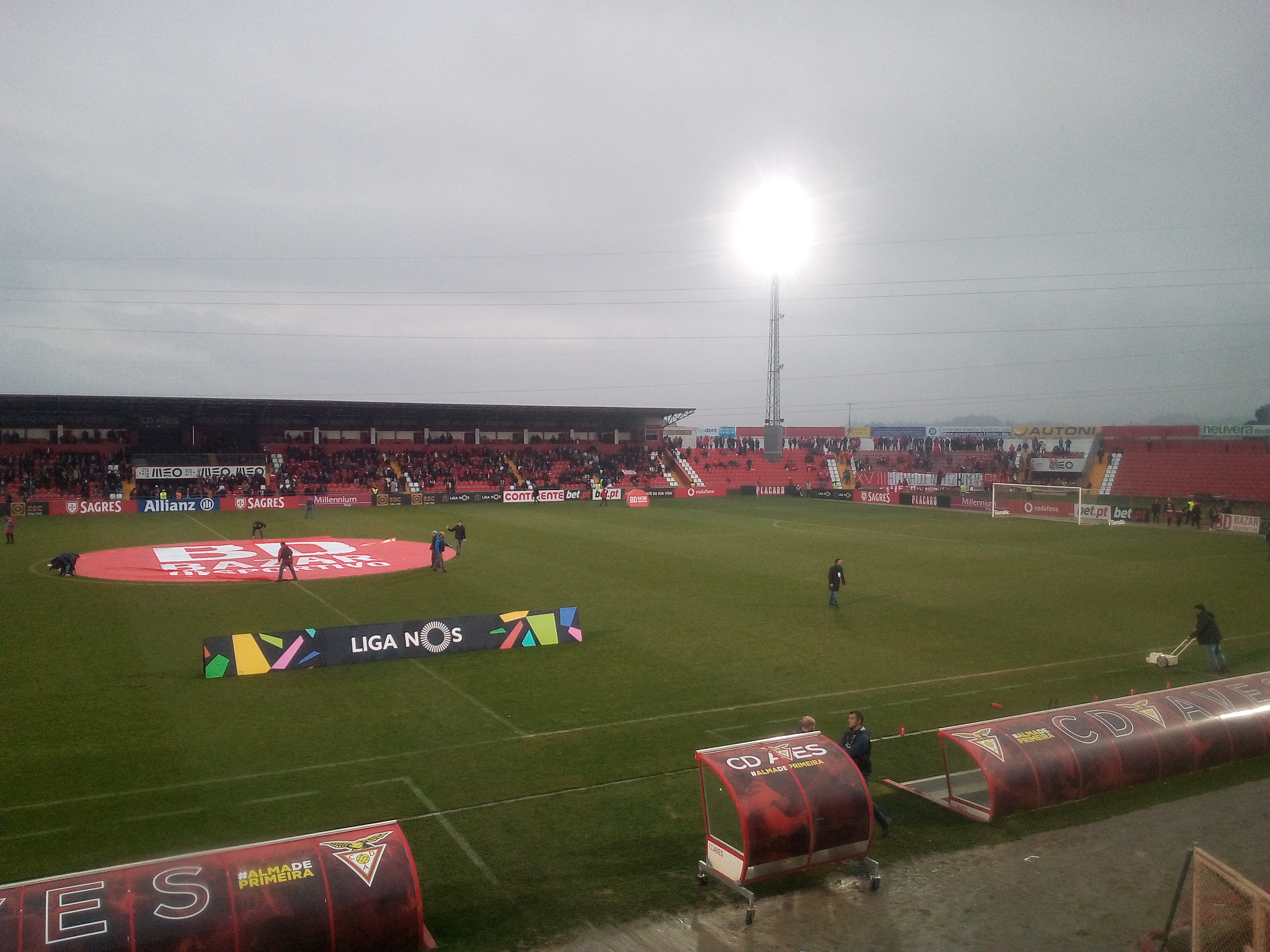
- Estádio do CD Aves
- Interactive map of Estádio do CD das Aves
- Full name: Estádio do Clube Desportivo das Aves
- Location: Vila das Aves, Portugal
- Owner: Desportivo das Aves
- Capacity: 6,230
- Surface: Grass
- Field size: 105 x 67 metres

Construction
- Built: 1981
- Opened: 8 December 1981
- Renovated: 2000

Tenants
- Desportivo das Aves (until 2021); AVS Futebol SAD (2023–present)

Estádio do CD das Aves is a multi-use stadium in Vila das Aves, Portugal. It is currently used mostly for football matches and is the home ground of previous C.D. Aves until 2021 and currently AVS Futebol SAD from 2023. The stadium holds 6,230 people and was built in 1981.

It underwent many renovations during the new millennium especially in the year 2000, when Desportivo das Aves gained promotion to the Primeira Liga for the second time in their history. When the stadium was built, it had a capacity of 8,560 available seats, but currently it has a capacity of only 6,230 people, after the club installed seats in the remaining stands.

The France national football team used the stadium as a training ground in preparation for UEFA Euro 2004.
