= Dener =

Male given name

Dener is a male given name. It may refer to:

- Dener (footballer, 1971–1994), Dener Augusto de Sousa, Brazilian football forward
- Dener Jaanimaa (born 1989), Estonian handball player
- Dener (footballer, 1991–2016), Dener Assunção Braz, Brazilian football left-back
- Dener (footballer, born 1992), Dener Gomes Clemente, Brazilian football attacking midfielder
- Dener (footballer, born 1995), Dener Gonçalves Pinheiro, Brazilian football midfielder
