= Raphael Aflalo =

Brazilian professional footballer

Personal information
- Full name: Raphael Aflalo Lopes Martins
- Date of birth: 8 July 1996 (age 30)
- Place of birth: São Paulo, Brazil
- Height: 1.90 m (6 ft 3 in)
- Position: Goalkeeper

Team information
- Current team: Felgueiras
- Number: 13

Youth career
- 2014–2017: Corinthians

Senior career*
Years	Team	Apps	(Gls)
2017–2018	Mirandela	3	(0)
2018–2020	Aves	5	(0)
2020–	Portimonense	0	(0)
2021–	→ Felgueiras (loan)	2	(0)
- * Club domestic league appearances and goals as of 21:01, 9 March 2022 (UTC)

Raphael Aflalo Lopes Martins (born 8 July 1996) is a Brazilian professional footballer who plays as a goalkeeper for Portuguese club Felgueiras on loan from Portimonense.

== Club career ==
Aflalo made his professional debut with Aves in a 1-0 Primeira Liga loss to Porto on 3 November 2019.

On 18 August 2021, he joined Felgueiras on loan.

== Personal life ==
On 20 April 2017, Aflalo fatally struck and killed a 17-year old in Brazil. In September 2019 Aflalo was not charged with homicide, his defense stating his vision was obstructed by another vehicle. Aflalo paid compensation to the victim's family to close the civil case. In March 2022, Aflalo received a suspended prison sentence for his role in the fatal accident and was required to carry out community service, as well as pay a fine. Police documents revealed that he had been speeding and his driving licence had expired.
