= Avtandil Ebralidze =

Georgian footballer

Personal information
- Date of birth: 3 October 1991 (age 35)
- Place of birth: Tbilisi, Georgia
- Height: 1.76 m (5 ft 9 in)
- Position: Winger

Team information
- Current team: Gonio

Youth career
- 2001–2008: Dinamo Tbilisi
- 2008–2009: Esperança de Lagos
- 2009–2010: Getafe

Senior career*
Years	Team	Apps	(Gls)
2010–2011	Esperança de Lagos	17	(4)
2011–2012	Juventude Évora	27	(2)
2012–2013	Oliveirense	46	(2)
2013–2017	Gil Vicente	102	(7)
2017–2018	Académico de Viseu	30	(7)
2018–2019	Chaves	12	(0)
2019	Nacional	3	(0)
2019–2020	Voluntari	14	(1)
2020–2021	Leixões	33	(0)
2021–2022	Doxa Katokopias	23	(4)
2022–2023	Anorthosis Famagusta	15	(1)
2023–2024	Leixões	19	(1)
2024–2025	Lusitânia	23	(0)
2025–	Gonio	0	(0)

International career
2013–2014	Georgia	3	(0)
- * Club domestic league appearances and goals as of 23:02, 25 December 2024 (UTC)

Avtandil "Avto" Ebralidze (Georgian: ავთანდილ ებრალიძე; born 3 October 1991) commonly known as Avto, is a Georgian footballer who plays as a winger for Erovnuli Liga 2 club Gonio.

== Club career ==
Avto began his professional career with fourth division side Esperança de Lagos in 2010 where he remained there one season. Following his spell with the Lagos side, Avto moved to third division side Juventude de Évora. His stay with Juventude de Évora saw him contribute two goals in 27 appearances.

In the summer of 2012, Avto moved to Segunda Liga side Oliveirense. Avto debuted for Oliveirense on 29 July 2012, in a 2012–13 Taça da Liga match against Belenenses where he played 76 minutes. Avto scored his first goal on 16 September 2012, in a 2012–13 Taça de Portugal match against Sintrense which helped his side win the tie 5–1.

=== Gil Vicente ===
On the 2 September 2013, the last day of the Portuguese transfer window, saw Avto move to Primeira Liga side Gil Vicente F.C. on a free transfer. Avto made his Gil Vicente debut on the 14 September, against Porto where he come on as a 77th minute.

=== Doxa Katokopias ===
On 15 July 2021, Ebralidze move to Cypriot First Division club Doxa Katokopia on a one-year contract until 2022.

=== Anorthosis Famagusta ===
On 28 June 2022, Ebralidze signed with Cypriot First Division club Anorthosis Famagusta on a two-year contract until 2024.

On 15 June 2023, Anorthosis announced that Ebralidze had left the team.

=== Return to Leixões ===
On 26 July 2023, Avto returned to Liga Portugal 2 club Leixões, signing a one-year contract with an option for a further two seasons.

=== Lusitânia ===
In July 2024 it was confirmed, that Avto had moved to Portuguese Liga 3 club Lusitânia.

=== Gonio ===
At age 33, Ebralidze returned home after an 18 year-long tenure abroad to sign his first contract with a Georgian club. A 1.5-year deal with 2nd division side Gonio was announced on 19 August 2025.

== International career ==
On the 6 October 2013, Ebralidze received his first call up to the Georgian national football team. He made his international debut on the 15 October against Spain, where he replaced Shota Grigalashvili in the 70th minute.
