= Lionn =

Brazilian footballer (born 1989)

Personal information
- Full name: José Lionn Barbosa de Lucena
- Date of birth: 29 January 1989 (age 37)
- Place of birth: Fortaleza, Brazil
- Height: 1.83 m (6 ft 0 in)
- Position: Right-back

Youth career
- 2003–2007: Ferroviário

Senior career*
Years	Team	Apps	(Gls)
2007	Ferroviário		
2007–2008	Torreense	27	(1)
2008–2011	Vitória Guimarães	11	(0)
2010	→ Olhanense (loan)	8	(0)
2011	→ Rio Ave (loan)	7	(0)
2011–2013	CFR Cluj	15	(1)
2012–2013	→ Rio Ave (loan)	25	(0)
2013–2018	Rio Ave	115	(1)
2018–2019	Chaves	12	(0)
2019–2020	Famalicão	11	(0)
2021–2022	Trofense	6	(0)
2022	Ferroviário	4	(0)
- * Club domestic league appearances and goals as of 19:56, 3 January 2023 (UTC)

José Lionn Barbosa de Lucena (born 29 January 1989), known as Lionn, is a Brazilian professional footballer who plays as a right-back.

== Club career ==
=== Early years and V. Guimarães ===
Born in Fortaleza, Ceará, Lionn spent his entire professional career in Portugal, signing with S.C.U. Torreense as an 18-year-old from Ferroviário Atlético Clube (CE). In 2008 he joined Vitória S.C. from the Primeira Liga, making his debut in the competition on 8 December in a 1–0 home win against Leixões S.C. where he played the full 90 minutes.

During his spell at the Estádio D. Afonso Henriques, Lionn was also loaned to fellow top-division teams S.C. Olhanense and Rio Ave FC.

=== Cluj and Rio Ave ===
Ahead of the 2011–12 season, Lionn moved to the Romanian Liga I with CFR Cluj. One year later, he was loaned to his former club Rio Ave.

Lionn scored his first goal in the Portuguese top division – and second as a professional – on 25 August 2013, helping the hosts to defeat Vitória F.C. 2–0. In the 2015–16 campaign, he started in 27 of his 28 league appearances as Rio Ave finished in sixth position, qualifying for the UEFA Europa League for the second time in its history. Subsequently, as his link was about to expire, he renewed his contract.

=== Later career ===
On 17 September 2018, Lionn signed a two-year deal with G.D. Chaves. After his team's relegation he continued in the Portuguese top tier, joining newly promoted F.C. Famalicão on a two-year contract.

== Honours ==
CFR Cluj

- Liga I: 2011–12
