= Filipe Brigues =

Portuguese footballer

Personal information
- Full name: Filipe Manuel Nunes Brigues
- Date of birth: 24 July 1990 (age 36)
- Place of birth: Alcácer do Sal, Portugal
- Height: 1.78 m (5 ft 10 in)
- Position: Right-back

Youth career
- 1999–2000: Alcacerense
- 2000–2009: Vitória Setúbal

Senior career*
| Years | Team | Apps | (Gls) |
| 2009–2011 | Vitória Setúbal | 3 | (0) |
| 2010–2011 | → Santa Clara (loan) | 8 | (0) |
| 2011–2012 | Marítimo B | 27 | (0) |
| 2013 | Farense | 13 | (0) |
| 2013–2014 | União Montemor | 31 | (3) |
| 2014–2015 | União Leiria | 16 | (2) |
| 2015 | Mafra | 1 | (0) |
| 2015–2018 | União Leiria | 91 | (7) |
| 2018 | Chaves | 2 | (0) |
| 2019 | Olhanense | 14 | (0) |
| 2019–2020 | Vilafranquense | 11 | (0) |
| 2020–2021 | Louletano | 24 | (0) |
| 2021–2023 | Alverca | 31 | (1) |
| Total | | 272 | (13) |
- * Club domestic league appearances and goals

Filipe Manuel Nunes Brigues (born 24 July 1990) is a Portuguese former professional footballer who played as a right-back.

== Club career ==
Born in Alcácer do Sal, Setúbal District, Brigues joined the youth system of local club Vitória F.C. at the age of 10. On 19 April 2009, he made the first of three Primeira Liga appearances with the team, coming on as a half-time substitute in a 4–0 home loss against S.L. Benfica.

Released in June 2011, Brigues competed exclusively in the third division for seven years. The 28-year-old returned to the top flight ahead of the 2018–19 season, signing a two-year contract with G.D. Chaves. After only four matches, however, he left to join Campeonato de Portugal side S.C. Olhanense on a one-and-a-half-year deal.

Until the end of his career, Brigues represented at the professional level U.D. Vilafranquense of Liga Portugal 2.
