= Nemanja Ćalasan =

Serbian footballer

Personal information
- Date of birth: 17 March 1996 (age 30)
- Place of birth: Subotica, FR Yugoslavia
- Height: 1.88 m (6 ft 2 in)
- Position: Centre back

Team information
- Current team: Andijon
- Number: 15

Youth career
- Spartak Subotica

Senior career*
Years	Team	Apps	(Gls)
2014–2015	Bačka 1901	12	(0)
2015–2018	Spartak Subotica	79	(2)
2015–2016	→ Bačka 1901 (loan)	26	(4)
2019–2021	Chaves	9	(0)
2021–2023	Leixões	44	(1)
2023	Čukarički	4	(0)
2023–2024	Spartak Subotica	40	(0)
2025	Elimai	26	(0)
2026–	Andijon	14	(1)

International career^{‡}
2016–2017	Serbia U20	5	(0)
2017–2019	Serbia U21	5	(0)
2017–	Serbia	1	(0)
- * Club domestic league appearances and goals as of 29 July 2026 ‡ National team caps and goals as of 27 March 2018

Nemanja Ćalasan (Serbian Cyrillic: Немања Ћаласан; born 17 March 1996) is a Serbian professional footballer who plays as a centre back for Uzbekistan Super League club Andijon.

== Club career ==
=== Spartak Subotica ===
Ćalasan started his career with Spartak Subotica, where he passed all youth selections. In 2014, he moved to local football club Bačka 1901, where he spent the 2014–15 season in the Serbian League Vojvodina. Next summer, he has joined the first team of Spartak Subotica, but shortly after he returned to Bačka 1901, this time as a loaned player until the end of 2015–16 season. At the beginning of 2016, Ćalasan signed his first professional contract with Spartak Subotica, and in summer of the same year, he became a regular member of the first squad. He started the 2016–17 season paired with Aleksandar Radovanović on the stopper places. After several goals for Bačka 1901 during the 2015–16 season in the Serbian League Vojvodina, Ćalasan scored his first SuperLiga goal in second fixture match, against Radnički Niš. During the 2016–17 season, Ćalasan made 32 matches at total in all competitions under coach Andrey Chernyshov.

During the 2017–18 season, Ćalasan made 31 appearances in both domestic competitions under coaches Aleksandar Veselinović and Vladimir Gaćinović, finishing at the 4th place of the SuperLiga table. Ćalasan made his first continental appearance in the first leg of the First qualifying round for 2018–19 UEFA Europa League campaign, against Coleraine, pairing with Dejan Kerkez as a centre-back. In the first match of the next round, played on 26 July 2018, Ćalasan scored for 2–0 win against Sparta Prague.

=== Chaves ===
On 12 January 2019, it was announced that Ćalasan signed a three-and-a-half-year contract with Primeira Liga club Chaves.

== International career ==
Ćalasan was called in Serbia U20 national squad by coach Nenad Lalatović, and made his debut for the team in a match against Montenegro in November 2016. At the beginning of 2017, he also received a call from Serbia national football team coach, Slavoljub Muslin, for a friendly match against United States on 29 January 2017, when he made a debut for the team. Ćalasan got his first call in Serbian under-21 team by coach Goran Đorović in September 2017. He made his debut for the team in away friendly against Qatar on 17 December 2017.

== Career statistics ==
=== Club ===
As of 1 January 2019

Appearances and goals by club, season and competition
Club	Season	League			Cup		Continental		Other		Total	
Club	Season	Division	Apps	Goals	Apps	Goals	Apps	Goals	Apps	Goals	Apps	Goals
Bačka 1901	2014–15	Serbian League Vojvodina	12	0	—		—		—		12	0
Bačka 1901	2015–16 (loan)	Serbian League Vojvodina	26	4	—		—		—		26	4
Bačka 1901	Total		38	4	—		—		—		38	4
Spartak Subotica	2015–16	Serbian SuperLiga	0	0	—		—		—		0	0
Spartak Subotica	2016–17	Serbian SuperLiga	31	1	1	0	—		—		32	1
Spartak Subotica	2017–18	Serbian SuperLiga	30	0	1	0	—		—		31	0
Spartak Subotica	2018–19	Serbian SuperLiga	18	1	2	0	5	1	—		25	2
Spartak Subotica	Total		79	2	4	0	5	1	—		88	3
Career total			117	6	4	0	5	1	—		126	7

=== International ===
As of 30 January 2017

Serbia
Year	Apps	Goals
2017	1	0
Total	1	0
