= Aves (Santo Tirso) =

- Civil parish
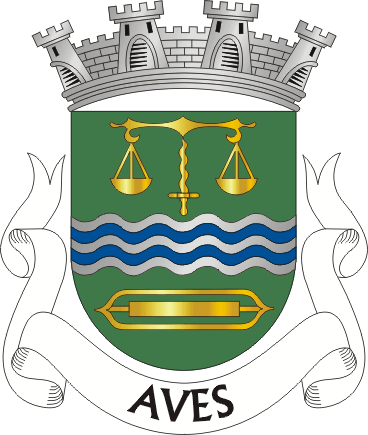
- Coat of arms

- Location in Portugal
- Coordinates: 41.364°N 8.407°W
- Country: Portugal
- Region: Norte
- Metropolitan area: Porto
- District: Porto
- Municipality: Santo Tirso

Area
  - Total: 6.16 km^{2} (2.38 sq mi)

Population (2011)
  - Total: 8,458
  - Density: 1,370/km^{2} (3,560/sq mi)
- Time zone: UTC+00:00 (WET)
  - Summer (DST): UTC+01:00 (WEST)
- Website: http://www.jf-viladasaves.pt/

Aves is an industrial town and civil parish (freguesia) in northern Portugal. The population in 2011 was 8,458, in an area of 6.16 km^{2}. It is located in the municipality of Santo Tirso, 6 km to the northeast of the municipality seat, the city of Santo Tirso proper, bordering the parish of Lordelo in the municipality of Guimarães. Aves is nowadays, after Santo Tirso itself, the most important town in the municipality of Santo Tirso.

== Sports ==
The local football team of Clube Desportivo das Aves played at the Portuguese Liga for six seasons, with three consecutive from 2016–17 to 2019–20. Also in that period they won the national cup in 2018. They folded in 2020 for financial reasons. The professional team AVS Futebol SAD moved into town in 2023, and also played at the top level in 2024–25 and 2025–26.
