= 2017–18 Taça de Portugal =

Taça de Portugal Placard

Tournament details
- Country: Portugal
- Dates: 3 September 2017 – 20 May 2018
- Teams: 153

Final positions
- Champions: Desportivo das Aves (1st title)
- Runners-up: Sporting CP

Tournament statistics
- Matches played: 171
- Goals scored: 539 (3.15 per match)
- Top goal scorer: Amilton (5 goals)

The 2017–18 Taça de Portugal (also known as Taça de Portugal Placard for sponsorship reasons) was the 78th season of the Taça de Portugal, the premier knockout competition in Portuguese football.

The competition was contested by 153 clubs, including teams from the top-three tiers of the Portuguese football league system (Note: Reserve or B teams are not eligible to participate.) and representatives of the fourth-tier District leagues and cups. It began with the first-round matches in September 2017 and was concluded in May 2018 with the final at the Estádio Nacional.

Desportivo das Aves defeated Sporting CP 2–1 and won their first Taça de Portugal, succeeding Benfica as trophy holders, but did not qualify for the 2018–19 UEFA Europa League group stage since they failed to obtain a license for European competitions.

== Format ==
Round	Teams remaining	Teams involved	Teams from the previous round	New teams in this round	Leagues entering in this round (tier level)
First round	153	120	none	120	Campeonato de Portugal (3rd); District Football Associations (4th)
Second round	110	92	60+17	15	LigaPro (2nd)
Third round	64	64	46	18	Primeira Liga (1st)
Fourth round	32	32	32	none	none
Fifth round	16	16	16	none	none
Quarter-finals	8	8	8	none	none
Semi-finals	4	4	4	none	none
Final	2	2	2	none	none

== Schedule ==
All draws are held at the FPF headquarters at Cidade do Futebol, in Oeiras. Match kick-off times are in WET (UTC±0) from the fourth round to the semi-finals, and in WEST (UTC+1) during the rest of the competition.

Round	Draw date	Date(s)	Fixtures	Teams	Prize money
First round	9 August 2017	3 September 2017	60	153 → 110	€2,000
Second round	11 September 2017	24 September 2017	46	110 → 64	€3,000
Third round	28 September 2017	15 October 2017	32	64 → 32	€4,000
Fourth round	19 October 2017	19 November 2017	16	32 → 16	€5,000
Fifth round	22 November 2017	12–14 December 2017	8	16 → 8	€7,500
Quarter-finals	18 December 2017	10–11 January 2018	4	8 → 4	€10,000
Semi-finals	18 December 2017	28 February 2018 (1st leg); 18 April 2018 (2nd leg)	4	4 → 2	€15,000
Final	18 December 2017	20 May 2018	1	2 → 1	€150,000 (losing finalist) €300,000 (winner)

== First round ==
A total of 120 teams from the Campeonato de Portugal (CP) and the District Football Associations (D) entered the first round. The draw took place on Wednesday, 9 August 2017, at 15:00 WEST. Teams were divided into eight series of 14 or 16 teams according to geographic criteria. Matches were played on 3 and 4 September 2017.

Number of teams per tier entering this round
Primeira Liga	LigaPro	Campeonato de Portugal	District FAs	Total
18 / 18	15 / 15	79 / 79	41 / 41	153 / 153

Fixtures

Series A

Team 1	Score	Team 2
Pedras Salgadas (CP)	2–0	(CP) Montalegre
A.D. Esposende (D)	1–2 (a.e.t.)	(CP) Torcatense
Merelinense (CP)	3–1 (a.e.t.)	(D) Cerveira
Águia de Vimioso (D)	1–0	(D) Desportivo de Monção
Vilaverdense (CP)	2–0	(CP) Bragança
Atlético dos Arcos (D)	3–5	(CP) Minas Argozelo
Maria da Fonte (D)	1–1 (a.e.t.) (4–3 p)	(CP) Mirandela

Series B

Team 1	Score	Team 2
Pedras Rubras (CP)	3–1	(CP) Camacha
Trofense (CP)	1–0	(CP) Arões S.C.
Sendim (D)	0–5	(CP) AD Oliveirense
Felgueiras 1932 (CP)	4–0	(D) Machico
Câmara de Lobos (CP)	0–2	(CP) Freamunde
Vizela (CP)	3–0 (a.e.t.)	(CP) Mondinense
Fafe (CP)	0–1 (a.e.t.)	(CP) Amarante
São Martinho (CP)	2–1 (a.e.t.)	(D) Vila Real

Series C

Team 1	Score	Team 2
Cinfães (CP)	2–2 (a.e.t.) (4–5 p)	(CP) Salgueiros
Resende (D)	1–0	(D) Lamego
Sousense (CP)	2–0	(D) Paredes
Canelas 2010 (CP)	3–2	(D) União Lamas
Coimbrões (CP)	1–0	(D) Rio Tinto
Régua(D)	1–3	(CP) Gondomar
Sporting de Espinho (CP)	0–0 (a.e.t.) (4–3 p)	(CP) Aliança de Gandra

Series D

Team 1	Score	Team 2
Tocha (D)	1–2	(D) Esmoriz
Sanjoanense (CP)	3–2	(D) Sabugal
Anadia (CP)	1–0	(CP) Recreio de Águeda
Lusitano de Vildemoinhos (CP)	4–1	(CP) Fornos de Algodres
Figueirense (D)	1–5	(CP) Mortágua
Ferreira de Aves (CP)	0–1	(CP) Cesarense
AD Nogueirense (CP)	0–1	(CP) Gafanha

Series E

Team 1	Score	Team 2
Fátima (CP)	4–0	(D) Mação
Alcanenense (CP)	0–0 (a.e.t.) (4–5 p)	(CP) Oleiros
Clube Condeixa (D)	3–0	(D) Pombal
Sertanense (CP)	0–2	(CP) Marinhense
Riachense (D)	0–2	(D) Idanhense
Benfica e Castelo Branco (CP)	5–1	(D) Leiria Marrazes
Alcains (D)	1–2	(CP) Águias do Moradal
União de Leiria (CP)	3–0	(CP) Sourense

Series F

Team 1	Score	Team 2
Lourinhanense (D)	0–2	(CP) Caldas
Mosteirense (D)	0–3	(CP) Eléctrico
Torreense (CP)	2–1	(CP) Loures
Sacavenense (CP)	2–0	(CP) 1º de Dezembro
Vilafranquense (CP)	1–2	(CP) Mafra
Crato (D)	1–2	(CP) Sintrense
Pêro Pinheiro (CP)	5–2	(CP) Coruchense

Series G

Team 1	Score	Team 2
Rabo de Peixe (D)	0–3	(CP) Sporting Ideal
Praiense (CP)	4–1	(D) Vale Formoso
Alta Lisboa (D)	4–0	(D) Flamengos
Charneca Caparica (D)	0–2	(CP) Operário
Casa Pia (CP)	2–0	(CP) Pinhalnovense
Vitória do Pico (D)	0–3	(D) Amora
Montijo (CP)	3–0	(CP) Lusitânia
Canaviais (D)	1–4	(CP) Guadalupe

Series H

Team 1	Score	Team 2
Farense (CP)	7–1	(CP) Estrela
Ferreiras (D)	2–5 (a.e.t.)	(CP) Moura
Lusitano Évora (D)	3–1	(CP) Vasco Gama
Almodôvar (D)	5–2	(D) Quarteirense
Olhanense (CP)	3–1	(CP) Almancilense
Louletano (CP)	1–1 (a.e.t.) (4–2 p)	(CP) Almancilense
Armacenenses (CP)	0–1	(CP) Moncarapachense
Oriental (CP)	1–2	(CP) Lusitano VRSA

== Second round ==
Number of teams per tier entering this round
Primeira Liga	LigaPro	Campeonato de Portugal	District FAs	Total
18 / 18	15 / 15	59 / 79	18 / 41	110 / 153

Repechage

The following 17 first-round losing teams were selected to compete in the second round:

- Alcains (D)
- Bragança (CP)
- Canaviais (D)
- Coruchense (CP)
- Crato (D)
- Lamego (D)
- Leiria Marrazes (D)
- Lourinhanense (D)
- Mirandela (CP)
- Mondinense (CP)
- Oriental (CP)
- Pinhalnovense (CP)
- Sertanense (CP)
- Sourense (CP)
- Vasco Gama (CP)
- Vila Real (D)
- Vilafranquense (CP)

Fixtures

23 September 2017	Mirandela (CP)	1–2	(II) Académica	Mirandela
15:00 WEST (UTC+01:00)	Yerson 51'		Djoussé 85'; Pedroso 90+3'	Stadium: Estádio São Sebastião; Referee: Jorge Sousa

23 September 2017	Gondomar (CP)	0–1	(II) Santa Clara	Gondomar
15:00 WEST (UTC+01:00)			Fernando 76'	Stadium: Estádio de São Miguel; Referee: Rui Costa

23 September 2017	Sporting Ideal (CP)	1–0	(D) Almodôvar	Ribeira Grande
15:00 WEST (UTC+01:00)	Bruno Fernandes 72' (o.g.)			Stadium: Estádio Municipal da Ribeira Grande; Referee: Tiago Mendes

24 September 2017	Vilafranquense (CP)	1–0	(II) Penafiel	Vila Franca de Xira
15:00 WEST (UTC+01:00)	Luís Pinto			Stadium: Campo do Cevadeiro; Referee: Bruno Paixão

24 September 2017	Clube Condeixa (D)	1–3	(II) Nacional	Condeixa-a-Nova
15:00 WEST (UTC+01:00)	André Gonçalo 56'		Rui Daniel 40' (o.g.); Murilo 58'; Witi 83'	Stadium: Municipal de Condeixa-a-Nova

24 September 2017	Coimbrões (CP)	1–3	(II) Famalicão	Vila Nova de Gaia
15:00 WEST (UTC+01:00)	Araújo 65'		Nuno Diogo 30'; Costa 83', 90+5'	Stadium: Parque Silva Matos; Referee: João Capela

24 September 2017	Vila Real (D)	1–0	(II) Oliveirense	Vila Real
15:00 WEST (UTC+01:00)	Okolie 83'			Stadium: Complexo Desportivo Monte Da Forca; Referee: Vítor Ferreira

24 September 2017	Amarante (CP)	1–0	(II) Varzim	Amarante
15:00 WEST (UTC+01:00)	Ayongo 72' (pen.)			Stadium: Estádio Municipal de Amarante; Referee: Cláudio Pereira

24 September 2017	Vizela (CP)	2–1	(II) Sporting da Covilhã	Vizela
15:00 WEST (UTC+01:00)	M. Oliveira 36'; Paredes 81'		Erivelto 90'	Stadium: Estádio do FC Vizela; Referee: Hélder Malheiro

24 September 2017	Lusitano de Vildemoinhos (CP)	0–1	(II) Académico de Viseu	Vildemoinhos, Viseu
15:00 WEST (UTC+01:00)			Sandro 78'	Stadium: Estádio dos Trambelos; Referee: Vasco Santos

24 September 2017	Moura (CP)	1–0	(II) Gil Vicente	Moura
15:00 WEST (UTC+01:00)	Drogba Camará 26'			Stadium: Estádio do Moura Atlético Clube; Referee: André Narciso

24 September 2017	Merelinense (CP)	3–1	(II) Real	Merelim
15:00 WEST (UTC+01:00)	Agdon 9', 52', 60'		M. Barbeiro 51'	Stadium: Estádio João Soares Vieira; Referee: Humberto Teixeira

24 September 2017	Minas Argozelo (CP)	0–4	(II) Cova da Piedade	Argozelo
11:00 WEST (UTC+01:00)			Robson 21'; Sampaio 61'; Dieguinho 81' (pen.), 90'	Stadium: Estádio Municipal de Vimioso; Referee: Gonçalo Martins

24 September 2017	Sourense (CP)	0–2 (a.e.t.)	(II) Leixões	Soure
15:00 WEST (UTC+01:00)			Jaime 110'; B. Lamas 120'	Stadium: Campo Dr. António Coelho Rodrigues; Referee: Carlos Espadinha

24 September 2017	Sertanense (CP)	0–2	(II) União da Madeira	Sertã
15:00 WEST (UTC+01:00)			Mica 41', 89'	Stadium: Estádio Dr. Marques dos Santos; Referee: Fábio Piló

24 September 2017	Sacavenense (CP)	0–1	(II) Arouca	Sacavém
15:00 WEST (UTC+01:00)			Coelho 40' (pen.)	Stadium: Campo do Sacavenense; Referee: Rui Oliveira

24 September 2017	Águia de Vimioso (D)	2–3	(CP) Vasco Gama	Vimioso
15:00 WEST (UTC+01:00)	H. Almeida 5'; Caio 80'		Calhau 3'; Pázinho 56'; J. Valente 58'	Stadium: Estádio Municipal de Vimioso; Referee: Ioan Vasilica

24 September 2017	Caldas (CP)	1–0	(CP) Montijo	Caldas da Rainha
15:00 WEST (UTC+01:00)	Santos 87'			Stadium: Campo da Mata; Referee: Rui Soares

24 September 2017	Pedras Rubras (CP)	0–4	(CP) Anadia	Pedras Rubras
15:00 WEST (UTC+01:00)			Tojó 29'; Mauro 45'; Jonathan 75'; B. Almeida 78'	Stadium: Estádio do FC Pederas Rubras; Referee: Fernando Cunha

24 September 2017	Idanhense (D)	0–4	(CP) São Martinho	Idanha-a-Nova
15:00 WEST (UTC+01:00)			Luther King 36'; Damien 69'; Bobô 86', 90'	Stadium: Estádio Municipal de Idanha-a-Nova; Referee: Sérgio Guelho

24 September 2017	Torcatense (CP)	2–0	(CP) Lusitano VRSA	São Torcato, Guimarães
15:00 WEST (UTC+01:00)	Pedro Rui 7', 29'			Stadium: Parque Desportivo do Arnado; Referee: José Rodrigues

24 September 2017	Felgueiras 1932 (CP)	2–1	(CP) Pedras Salgadas	Felgueiras
15:00 WEST (UTC+01:00)	Torres 86'; Adelaja 90'		Mota 53'	Stadium: Estádio Dr. Machado de Matos; Referee: Carlos Macedo

24 September 2017	Cesarense (CP)	3–2	(CP) Águias Moradal	Cesar
15:00 WEST (UTC+01:00)	Chapinha 35'; Júlio Alves 38'; Diogo Pereira 45'		Bouças 58'; Kuittinen 80'	Stadium: Estádio Mergulhão; Referee: André Neto

24 September 2017	Sporting de Espinho (CP)	1–0	(CP) Moncarapachense	Espinho
15:00 WEST (UTC+01:00)	Carlitos 90+2'			Stadium: Estádio Comendador Manuel Violas; Referee: António Alves

24 September 2017	Benfica e Castelo Branco (CP)	0–2	(CP) União de Leiria	Castelo Branco
15:00 WEST (UTC+01:00)			Diaby 47'; Antwi 78'	Stadium: Estádio Municipal Vale do Romeiro; Referee: José Laranjeira

24 September 2017	Trofense (CP)	0–1	(CP) Sintrense	Trofa
15:00 WEST (UTC+01:00)			Bamba 69'	Stadium: Estádio do CD Trofense; Referee: Hélder Lamas

24 September 2017	Freamunde (CP)	4–2	(D) Maria da Fonte	Freamunde
15:00 WEST (UTC+01:00)	Luizinho 1'; Miguel Pedro 31'; Fausto 45' (pen.); A. Sala 61'		H. Vieira 14'; B. Filipe 53'	Stadium: Complexo Desportivo do SC Freamunde; Referee: António Moreira

24 September 2017	Guadalupe (CP)	2–3	(CP) Operário	Guadalupe
16:00 WEST (UTC+01:00)	Diogo Conceição 72'; Mário Melo 90+4'		Chileno 42'; Mamadu Camará 45', 68'	Stadium: Campo de Jogos de Guadalupe; Referee: Miguel Silva

24 September 2017	Sanjoanense (CP)	3–0	(D) Crato	São João da Madeira
15:00 WEST (UTC+01:00)	Teles 4'; Prazeres 11'; Edema 38'			Stadium: Estádio Conde Dias Garcia; Referee: Gustavo Correia

24 September 2017	Canelas 2010 (CP)	3–0	(D) Resende	Canelas
15:00 WEST (UTC+01:00)	Andrés Cabrera 63'; Ofosu 84'; Ricardo Rodrigues 86'			Stadium: Estádio do Canelas Gaia Futebol Clube; Referee: Albano Correia

24 September 2017	Pinhalnovense (CP)	4–0	(D) Leiria Marrazes	Pinhal Novo
15:00 WEST (UTC+01:00)	Ely 12', 59', 65'; Sócrates 82'			Stadium: Campo de Jogos Santos Jorge; Referee: Gonçalo Nunes

24 September 2017	Fátima (CP)	4–2 (a.e.t.)	(CP) Eléctrico	Fátima
15:00 WEST (UTC+01:00)	M. Mendonça 39', 90'; Renan 104'; Hamza Jouini 117'		Cláudio Alves 83', 86'	Stadium: Estádio Papa Francisco; Referee: Paulo Ferrás

24 September 2017	Lusitano Évora (D)	4–1	(CP) Pêro Pinheiro	Évora
15:00 WEST (UTC+01:00)	Barbosa 53'; F. Serrano 58'; Jair 62'; R. Ferro 90+2'		Bruno Botas 68'	Stadium: Complexo Desportivo do Lusitano; Referee: Marcos Brazão

24 September 2017	Oleiros (CP)	3–0	(CP) Sousense	Oleiros
15:00 WEST (UTC+01:00)	Jackson 34', 69', 76'			Stadium: Estádio Municipal de Oleiros; Referee: Renato Gonçalves

24 September 2017	Lourinhanense (D)	2–3	(CP) Gafanha	Lourinhã
15:00 WEST (UTC+01:00)	J. Ferreira 11'; Ricardinho 26'		Lio 13' (pen.), 47'; Gledson 78'	Stadium: Estádio Municipal da Lourinhã; Referee: João Mendes

24 September 2017	Olhanense (CP)	4–1	(D) Lamego	Olhão
15:00 WEST (UTC+01:00)	T. Barros 43'; Hassan 45'; Januário 65'; Jefferson Encada 72'		Pedro Xarrato 90'	Stadium: Estádio José Arcanjo; Referee: Miguel Nogueira

24 September 2017	Amora (D)	2–3	(CP) Farense	Amora
15:00 WEST (UTC+01:00)	Sapo 37' (o.g.); França 59' (pen.)		F. Gomes 9', 22', 45'	Stadium: Estádio da Medideira; Referee: Pedro Ramalho

24 September 2017	Alta Lisboa (D)	3–2	(CP) Salgueiros	Lumiar
15:00 WEST (UTC+01:00)	Vítor Gregório 30'; Miguel Martinho 42'; Filipe Saraiva 76'		Yero 5', 18'	Stadium: Complexo Desportivo do Alto do Lumiar; Referee: José Gorjão

24 September 2017	Coruchense (CP)	5–2	(CP) Mondinense	Coruche
15:00 WEST (UTC+01:00)	Joel Simões 3', 49'; Romeu Pinto 55' (o.g.); Ricardo Henriques 72'; Serge Hermann 83'		João Padi 14'; Rui Jorge 67'	Stadium: Estádio Municipal Prof. José; Referee: Tiago Pinto

24 September 2017	Esmoriz (D)	0–1	(CP) Vilaverdense	Esmoriz
15:00 WEST (UTC+01:00)			Joel 35'	Stadium: Estádio da Barrinha; Referee: Marco Cruz

24 September 2017	AD Oliveirense (CP)	2–1	(CP) Mafra	Santa Maria de Oliveira, Famalicão
15:00 WEST (UTC+01:00)	Caleb Gomina 60', 72'		Antunes 66'	Stadium: Estádio da Ribes; Referee: João Pinho

24 September 2017	Bragança (CP)	1–1 (a.e.t.) (3–4 p)	(D) Alcains	Bragança
15:00 WEST (UTC+01:00)	Carvalho 86'		Fábio Brito 21'	Stadium: Estádio Municipal de Bragança; Referee: Rui Jorge Silva

24 September 2017	Praiense (CP)	2–0	(CP) Louletano	Praia da Vitória
15:00 WEST (UTC+01:00)	Magina 86'; André Azevedo 86'			Stadium: Estádio Municipal da Praia da Vitória; Referee: Hugo Silva

24 September 2017	Casa Pia (CP)	5–0	(CP) Canaviais	Lisbon
15:00 WEST (UTC+01:00)	Márcio Augusto 18'; Faísca 45'; Sérgio Nogueira 62', 75'; José Júnior 70'			Stadium: Estádio Pina Manique; Referee: Paulo Barradas

24 September 2017	Mortágua (CP)	0–2	(CP) Torreense	Mortágua
15:00 WEST (UTC+01:00)			P. Bonifácio 17'; Leandro Morais 58'	Stadium: Campo da Gandarada; Referee: Luís Máximo

24 September 2017	Marinhense (CP)	0–1	(CP) Oriental	Marinha Grande
15:00 WEST (UTC+01:00)			Victor Veloso 42'	Stadium: Estádio Municipal da Marinha Grande; Referee: Leonardo Marques

== Third round ==
A total of 64 teams participated in the third round, which included the 46 winners of the previous round and the 18 teams competing in the 2017–18 Primeira Liga (I). The draw took place on Thursday, 28 September 2017, at 15:00 WEST, and matches were played between 12 and 15 October 2017.

Number of teams per tier entering this round
Primeira Liga	LigaPro	Campeonato de Portugal	District FAs	Total
18 / 18	9 / 15	33 / 79	4 / 41	64 / 153

Fixtures

12 October 2017	Oleiros (CP)	2–4	(I) Sporting CP	Oleiros
20:15 WEST (UTC+01:00)	Jackson 80'; Djô Djô 90+3'		Palhinha 23', 62'; Mattheus 41'; Leão 86'	Stadium: Municipal de Oleiros; Attendance: 2,000; Referee: Gonçalo Martins

13 October 2017	Lusitano Évora (D)	0–6	(I) Porto	Lisbon
20:15 WEST (UTC+01:00)			Aboubakar 20', 21'; Marcano 49'; Otávio 55'; Galeno 59'; Hernâni 90'	Stadium: Estádio do Restelo; Referee: Hélder Malheiro

14 October 2017	Vasco Gama (CP)	1–6	(I) Vitória de Guimarães	Vidigueira
15:00 WEST (UTC+01:00)	Pázinho 30'		Moreno 5'; R. Martins 16'; Duarte 27'; Tallo 70'; Texeira 90', 90+2'	Stadium: Municipal da Vidigueira; Referee: Nuno Almeida

14 October 2017	Torcatense (CP)	0–1	(I) Marítimo	São Torcato, Guimarães
15:00 WEST (UTC+01:00)			Everton 5'	Stadium: Parque Desportivo do Arnado; Referee: Luís Ferreira

14 October 2017	São Martinho (CP)	2–3	(I) Braga	Aves
18:00 WEST (UTC+01:00)	Luther King 52'; D. Alves 56'		Dyego 11', 39'; F. Martins 53'	Stadium: Estádio do CD Aves; Referee: Manuel Oliveira

14 October 2017	Académico de Viseu (II)	0–0 (a.e.t.) (3–4 p)	(I) Feirense	Viseu
18:00 WEST (UTC+01:00)				Stadium: Estádio do Fontelo; Referee: Vítor Ferreira

14 October 2017	Olhanense (CP)	0–1	(I) Benfica	Faro/Loulé
19:00 WEST (UTC+01:00)			Gabriel 4'	Stadium: Estádio Algarve; Referee: Bruno Paixão

15 October 2017	Operário (CP)	2–4	(CP) Felgueiras 1932	Lagoa
12:00 WEST (UTC+01:00)	22'; 44' (pen.)		Porto 5'; Cuca 7'; Pape Mané 34'; Torres 41'	Stadium: Estádio João Gualberto Borges Arruda; Referee: André Gralha

15 October 2017	Cova da Piedade (II)	1–1 (a.e.t.) (4–3 p)	(CP) Anadia	Cova da Piedade
15:00 WEST (UTC+01:00)	Onyilo 21'		Vieira 66'	Stadium: Estádio Municipal José Martins Vieira; Referee: Fábio Veríssimo

15 October 2017	Sanjoanense (CP)	0–4	(I) Rio Ave	São João da Madeira
15:00 WEST (UTC+01:00)			Karamanos 17'; Geraldes 47'; N. Santos 81'; Yazalde 90+3'	Stadium: Estádio Conde Dias Garcia; Referee: Vasco Santos

15 October 2017	Pinhalnovense (CP)	1–2 (a.e.t.)	(I) Vitória de Setúbal	Pinhal Novo
15:00 WEST (UTC+01:00)	Alain 90+7'		Paciência 65'; J. Teixeira 113'	Stadium: Campo de Jogos Santos Jorge; Referee: Bruno Esteves

15 October 2017	Leixões (II)	3–2 (a.e.t.)	(I) Tondela	Matosinhos
15:00 WEST (UTC+01:00)	Lamas 70'; Kukula 84'; Breitner 96'		Tomané 14'; Murilo 47'	Stadium: Estádio do Mar; Referee: Jorge Sousa

15 October 2017	União da Madeira (II)	3–2	(CP) Oriental	Ribeira Brava
15:00 WEST (UTC+01:00)	Luan 24'; Orlandić 51'; Romaric 55'		Machado 4' (pen.); Veloso 45+3'	Stadium: Centro Desportivo da Madeira; Referee: Daniel Cardoso

15 October 2017	Vilafranquense (CP)	2–1 (a.e.t.)	(CP) Casa Pia	Vila Franca de Xira
15:00 WEST (UTC+01:00)	J. Oliveira 80' (o.g.); C. David 99'		J. Coito 90'	Stadium: Campo do Cevadeiro; Referee: Ricardo Baixinho

15 October 2017	Praiense (CP)	4–1	(D) Alcains	Praia da Vitória
15:00 WEST (UTC+01:00)	Stehb 3'; Fonseca 30'; Patrick 70'; F. Andrade 79'		F. Velho 84'	Stadium: Estádio Municipal da Praia da Vitória; Referee: Carlos Cabral

15 October 2017	Alta Lisboa (D)	0–2	(II) Famalicão	Lumiar
15:00 WEST (UTC+01:00)			Feliz 33'; Monteiro 90+2'	Stadium: Complexo Desportivo do Alto do Lumiar; Referee: Carlos Espadinha

15 October 2017	Fátima (CP)	0–3	(I) Chaves	Fátima
15:00 WEST (UTC+01:00)			M. Pereira 9'; Tiba 43' (pen.); Platiny 55'	Stadium: Estádio Papa Francisco; Referee: Tiago Martins

15 October 2017	Canelas 2010 (CP)	1–3	(I) Moreirense	Canelas
15:00 WEST (UTC+01:00)	V. Borges 72'		Tozé 33', 88'; Sayed 75'	Stadium: Estádio do Canelas Gaia Futebol Clube; Referee: Carlos Xistra

15 October 2017	Cesarense (CP)	1–2	(CP) Caldas	Cesar
15:00 WEST (UTC+01:00)	Â. Oliveira 29'		Juvenal 68'; J. Rodrigues 85' (pen.)	Stadium: Estádio Mergulhão; Referee: Pedro Maia

15 October 2017	Vizela (CP)	3–1	(CP) Sintrense	Vizela
15:00 WEST (UTC+01:00)	Mércio 45+1'; J. Cunha 87' (pen.); Boakye 90'		Érico 32'	Stadium: Estádio do FC Vizela; Referee: António Alves

15 October 2017	União de Leiria (CP)	2–0	(CP) Sporting de Espinho	Leiria
15:00 WEST (UTC+01:00)	Vieira 33', 88'			Stadium: Estádio Dr. Magalhães Pessoa; Referee: Hugo Silva

15 October 2017	AD Oliveirense (CP)	0–0 (a.e.t.) (5–4 p)	(CP) Torreense	Santa Maria de Oliveira, Vila Nova de Famalicão
15:00 WEST (UTC+01:00)				Stadium: Estádio da Ribes

15 October 2017	Gafanha (CP)	0–0 (a.e.t.) (3–4 p)	(CP) Freamunde	Gafanha da Nazaré
15:00 WEST (UTC+01:00)				Stadium: Complexo Desportivo da Gafanha da Nazaré; Referee: José Laranjeira

15 October 2017	Arouca (II)	3–0	(CP) Coruchense	Arouca
15:00 WEST (UTC+01:00)	Roberto 69' (pen.), 89'; Bukia 87'			Stadium: Estádio Municipal de Arouca; Referee: André Narciso

15 October 2017	Nacional (II)	4–2	(CP) Merelinense	Funchal
15:00 WEST (UTC+01:00)	Perre 8' (o.g.); Camacho 10'; Jota 18'; Vanílson 75' (pen.)		Perre 48'; Agdon 58' (pen.)	Stadium: Estádio da Madeira; Referee: Fábio Piló

15 October 2017	Vila Real (D)	0–1	(I) Desportivo das Aves	Vila Real
15:00 WEST (UTC+01:00)			Júnior 86' (o.g.)	Stadium: Complexo Desportivo Monte Da Forca; Referee: Rui Oliveira

15 October 2017	Santa Clara (II)	2–1	(I) Belenenses	Ponta Delgada
15:00 WEST (UTC+01:00)	Fernando 40'; Clemente 89'		Maurides 51'	Stadium: Estádio de São Miguel; Referee: Manuel Mota

15 October 2017	Farense (CP)	1–0	(I) Estoril	Faro
15:00 WEST (UTC+01:00)	Ribeiro 77' (pen.)			Stadium: Estádio de São Luís; Referee: António Nobre

15 October 2017	Moura (CP)	0–0 (a.e.t.) (6–7 p)	(I) Portimonense	Moura
15:00 WEST (UTC+01:00)				Stadium: Estádio do Moura Atlético Clube; Attendance: João Capela

15 October 2017	Amarante (CP)	1–1 (a.e.t.) (4–5 p)	(CP) Sporting Ideal	Amarante
15:00 WEST (UTC+01:00)	Ayongo 90' (pen.)		Santos 45+1'	Stadium: Estádio Municipal de Amarante

15 October 2017	Vilaverdense (CP)	1–0	(I) Boavista	Vila Verde
15:00 WEST (UTC+01:00)	Vieira 45+1'			Stadium: Campo Cruz do Reguengo; Referee: Rui Costa

15 October 2017	Académica (II)	2–1 (a.e.t.)	(I) Paços de Ferreira	Coimbra
19:00 WEST (UTC+01:00)	Pedroso 90+12'; Marinho 108'		Luiz Phellype 45+7'	Stadium: Estádio Cidade de Coimbra; Referee: João Pinheiro

== Fourth round ==
A total of 32 teams participated in the fourth round, all of which advanced from the previous round. The draw took place on Thursday, 19 October 2017, at 12:30 WEST, and unlike previous rounds, was free of restrictions. Matches were played between 16 and 19 November 2017.

Number of teams per tier entering this round
Primeira Liga	LigaPro	Campeonato de Portugal	District FAs	Total
13 / 18	8 / 15	11 / 79	0 / 41	32 / 153

Fixtures

16 November 2017	Sporting CP (I)	2–0	(II) Famalicão	Lisbon
20:30 WET (UTC±00:00)	Coates 65'; Dost 81'			Stadium: Estádio José Alvalade; Referee: Hélder Malheiro

17 November 2017	Porto (I)	3–2	(I) Portimonense	Porto
20:30 WET (UTC±00:00)	D. Pereira 4'; Aboubakar 90+1'; Brahimi 90+5'		Wellington 30'; Sá 69'	Stadium: Estádio do Dragão; Referee: Artur Soares Dias

18 November 2017	Benfica (I)	2–0	(I) Vitória de Setúbal	Lisbon
18:15 WET (UTC±00:00)	Cervi 25'; Krovinović 80'			Stadium: Estádio da Luz; Referee: João Capela

18 November 2017	Rio Ave (I)	1–0	(I) Braga	Vila do Conde
20:30 WET (UTC±00:00)	Guedes 36'			Stadium: Estádio do Rio Ave; Referee: Tiago Martins

19 November 2017	AD Oliveirense (CP)	2–3 (a.e.t.)	(I) Marítimo	Santa Maria de Oliveira, Vila Nova de Famalicão
14:30 WET (UTC±00:00)	Apolo 36', 83'		Pinho 41', 90+3', 105'	Stadium: Estádio da Ribes; Referee: Vasco Santos

19 November 2017	Caldas (CP)	1–1 (a.e.t.) (3–1 p)	(II) Arouca	Caldas da Rainha
15:00 WET (UTC±00:00)	J. Rodrigues 29'		Areias 75'	Stadium: Campo da Mata; Referee: João Pinto

19 November 2017	Praiense (CP)	3–2 (a.e.t.)	(CP) Vilafranquense	Praia da Vitória
15:00 WET (UTC±00:00)	Cristiano 6'; Dinamite 112'; Magina 116'		Izata 25'; Luquinhas 96'	Stadium: Estádio Municipal da Praia da Vitória; Referee: Rui Soares

19 November 2017	Farense (CP)	2–1	(II) Leixões	Faro
15:00 WET (UTC±00:00)	Tomé 37'; Irobiso 57'		Jaime 28'	Stadium: Estádio de São Luís; Referee: Fábio Veríssimo

19 November 2017	Moreirense (I)	5–2	(CP) Felgueiras 1932	Moreira de Cónegos
15:00 WET (UTC±00:00)	Zakpa 22' (o.g.); Arsénio 42'; Neto 45'; Maciel 82', 90+3'		Cláudio 79'; Fernandes 88' (pen.)	Stadium: Parque Joaquim Almeida Freitas; Referee: Manuel Oliveira

19 November 2017	Vizela (CP)	2–2 (a.e.t.) (2–4 p)	(CP) Vilaverdense	Vizela
15:00 WET (UTC±00:00)	Correia 25'; Yakubu 113'		Zé Pedro 13'; Lemos 120+1'	Stadium: Estádio do FC Vizela; Referee: Pedro Campos

19 November 2017	União da Madeira (II)	4–2	(CP) Freamunde	Ribeira Brava
15:00 WET (UTC±00:00)	Abreu 10', 43'; Luan 46', 57' (pen.)		Pedro 17'; Niang 26'	Stadium: Centro Desportivo da Madeira; Referee: Bruno Esteves

19 November 2017	Académica (II)	1–0	(II) Nacional	Coimbra
15:00 WET (UTC±00:00)	Marinho 62'			Stadium: Estádio Cidade de Coimbra; Referee: Luís Godinho

19 November 2017	Sporting Ideal (CP)	1–4	(II) Cova da Piedade	Ribeira Grande
15:00 WET (UTC±00:00)	Arruda 75'		Michael 11'; Willyan 28'; Firmino 35'; Ballack 40'	Stadium: Estádio Municipal da Ribeira Grande; Referee: Sérgio Piscarreta

19 November 2017	União de Leiria (CP)	0–3	(I) Desportivo das Aves	Leiria
15:00 WET (UTC±00:00)			Derley 27'; Gomes 66'; Amilton 83'	Stadium: Estádio Dr. Magalhães Pessoa; Referee: António Nobre

19 November 2017	Santa Clara (II)	2–0	(I) Chaves	Ponta Delgada
16:00 WET (UTC±00:00)	Fernando 19'; Alves 23'			Stadium: Estádio de São Miguel; Referee: Hugo Miguel

19 November 2017	Vitória de Guimarães (I)	2–1	(I) Feirense	Guimarães
20:15 WET (UTC±00:00)	Héldon 4'; Raphinha 58'		J. Silva 78'	Stadium: Estádio D. Afonso Henriques; Referee: Rui Costa

== Fifth round ==
A total of 16 teams participated in the fifth round, all of which advanced from the previous round. The draw took place on Wednesday, 22 November 2017, at 12:30 WET, and matches were played between 6 and 30 December 2017.

Number of teams per tier entering this round
Primeira Liga	LigaPro	Campeonato de Portugal	District FAs	Total
8 / 18	4 / 15	4 / 79	0 / 41	16 / 153

Fixtures

6 December 2017	Marítimo (I)	0–0 (a.e.t.) (2–4 p)	(II) Cova da Piedade	Funchal
16:00 WET (UTC±00:00)				Stadium: Estádio do Marítimo

13 December 2017	Moreirense (I)	2–2 (a.e.t.) (6–5 p)	(II) Santa Clara	Moreira de Cónegos
15:00 WET (UTC±00:00)	Tozé 34'; Abarhoun 53'		Rashid 8'; Santana 90+1'	Stadium: Parque Joaquim Almeida Freitas; Attendance: 444; Referee: Luís Godinho

13 December 2017	União da Madeira (II)	1–5	(I) Desportivo das Aves	Ribeira Brava
15:00 WET (UTC±00:00)	Flávio 67'		Machado 20' (pen.); Amilton 34', 49', 59'; Defendi 45'	Stadium: Centro Desportivo da Madeira; Referee: João Pinheiro

13 December 2017	Praiense (CP)	0–1	(CP) Farense	Praia da Vitória
15:30 WET (UTC±00:00)			Fabrício Isidoro 23'	Stadium: Estádio Municipal da Praia da Vitória; Referee: Hugo Pacheco

13 December 2017	Sporting CP (I)	4–0	(CP) Vilaverdense	Lisbon
19:00 WET (UTC±00:00)	Doumbia 45', 64', 74'; Martins 88'			Stadium: Estádio José Alvalade; Referee: Luís Ferreira

13 December 2017	Rio Ave (I)	3–2 (a.e.t.)	(I) Benfica	Vila do Conde
21:00 WET (UTC±00:00)	Lionn 47'; Ribeiro 62'; Guedes 94'		Jonas 36'; Luisão 86'	Stadium: Estádio do Rio Ave; Referee: Fábio Veríssimo

14 December 2017	Porto (I)	4–0	(I) Vitória de Guimarães	Porto
20:15 WET (UTC±00:00)	Aboubakar 12' (pen.); D. Pereira 58'; André 64', 83'			Stadium: Estádio do Dragão; Referee: Carlos Xistra

30 December 2017	Caldas (CP)	1–1 (a.e.t.) (4–2 p)	(II) Académica	Caldas da Rainha
15:00 WET (UTC±00:00)	João Tarzan 18'		Moura 68'	Stadium: Campo da Mata; Attendance: 8000
	Penalties
	João Tarzan (penalty scored); Clemente (penalty scored); Cruz (penalty scored); Januário (penalty missed); Simões (penalty scored)		(penalty missed) Pedroso; (penalty missed) Chiquinho; (penalty scored) Hwang; (penalty scored) Harramiz

== Quarter-finals ==
Eight teams participated in the quarter-finals, all having advanced from the previous round. The draw took place on Monday, 18 December 2017, at 12:00 WET, and matches were played on 10 and 11 January 2018.

Number of teams per tier entering this round
Primeira Liga	LigaPro	Campeonato de Portugal	District FAs	Total
5 / 18	1 / 15	2 / 79	0 / 41	8 / 153

Fixtures

10 January 2018	Caldas (CP)	3–2 (a.e.t.)	(CP) Farense	Caldas da Raínha
18:00 WET (UTC±00:00)	Januário 56'; Pedro Emanuel 70', 116'		Livramento 48', 61'	Stadium: Campo da Mata; Referee: António Moreira

10 January 2018	Rio Ave (I)	4–4 (a.e.t.) (4–5 p)	(I) Desportivo das Aves	Vila do Conde
19:00 WET (UTC±00:00)	Marcelo 17'; Tarantini 53'; Novais 74'; Gelson 114'		Defendi 49'; Amilton 88'; Arango 90', 105'	Stadium: Estádio do Rio Ave; Referee: Carlos Xistra
	Penalties
	Gabrielzinho (penalty scored); Novais (penalty scored); Monte (penalty scored); Ribeiro (penalty scored); Teles (penalty missed)		(penalty scored) Sami; (penalty scored) Arango; (penalty scored) Nildo Petrolina; (penalty scored) Falcone; (penalty scored) Falcão

10 January 2018	Cova da Piedade (II)	1–2	(I) Sporting CP	Setúbal
20:30 WET (UTC±00:00)	Cléo 58' (pen.)		Fernandes 54'; Dost 78'	Stadium: Estádio do Bonfim; Referee: Rui Costa

11 January 2018	Moreirense (I)	1–2	(I) Porto	Moreira de Cónegos
20:30 WET (UTC±00:00)	Edno 73'		Herrera 8'; Layún 20'	Stadium: Parque Joaquim Almeida Freitas; Referee: Manuel Moreira

== Semi-finals ==
The semi-final pairings were determined after the draw for the quarter-finals on Monday, 18 December 2017, at 12:00 WET. This round will be contested over two legs in a home-and-away system, with the first leg played on 7 and 28 February and the second leg played on 18 April 2018.

Number of teams per tier entering this round
Primeira Liga	LigaPro	Campeonato de Portugal	District FAs	Total
3 / 18	0 / 15	1 / 79	0 / 41	4 / 153

Fixtures

28 February 2018
20:15 WET (UTC±00:00)

Desportivo das Aves (I)	1–0	(CP) Caldas
Nildo Petrolina 32' (pen.)

Estádio do CD Aves, Vila das Aves
Referee: Gonçalo Martins
18 April 2018
18:30 WEST (UTC+01:00)

Caldas (CP)	1–2 (a.e.t.)	(I) Desportivo das Aves
Jorge Fellipe 55' (o.g.)		Gomes 97', 107'

Campo da Mata, Caldas da Rainha
Referee: Fábio Veríssimo

Desportivo das Aves won 3–1 on aggregate.

7 February 2018
20:15 WET (UTC±00:00)

Porto (I)	1–0	(I) Sporting CP
Soares 60'

Estádio do Dragão, Porto
Referee: João Pinheiro
18 April 2018
20:30 WEST (UTC+01:00)

Sporting CP (I)	1–0 (a.e.t.)	(I) Porto
Coates 85'
Penalties
Fernandes (penalty scored); B. Ruiz (penalty scored); Mathieu (penalty scored); Coates (penalty scored); Montero (penalty scored)	5–4	(penalty missed) Marcano; (penalty scored) Telles; (penalty scored) Felipe; (penalty scored) Reyes; (penalty scored) Oliveira

Estádio José Alvalade, Lisbon
Referee: Jorge Sousa

1–1 on aggregate. Sporting CP won 5–4 on penalties.

== Final ==
20 May 2018
17:15 WEST

Desportivo das Aves	2–1	Sporting CP
Guedes 16', 72'		Montero 85'

Estádio Nacional, Oeiras
Attendance: 35,890
Referee: Tiago Martins

== Bracket ==
Third Round
15 October 2017
Sanjoanense	0
Rio Ave	4
14 October 2017
São Martinho	2
Braga	3
14 October 2017
Olhanense	0
Benfica	1
15 October 2017
Pinhalnovense	1
Vitória de Setúbal (a.e.t.)	2
15 October 2017
União da Madeira	3
Oriental	2
15 October 2017
Gafanha	0 (3)
Freamunde (p)	0 (4)
15 October 2017
União de Leiria	2
Sporting de Espinho	0
15 October 2017
Vila Real	0
Desportivo das Aves	1
15 October 2017
Cesarense	1
Caldas	2
15 October 2017
Arouca	3
Coruchense	0
15 October 2017
Académica (a.e.t.)	2
Paços de Ferreira	1
15 October 2017
Nacional	4
Merelinense	2
15 October 2017
Praiense	4
Alcains	1
15 October 2017
Vilafranquense (a.e.t.)	2
Casa Pia	1
15 October 2017
Farense	1
Estoril	0
15 October 2017
Leixões (a.e.t.)	3
Tondela	2
15 October 2017
Canelas 2010	1
Moreirense	3
15 October 2017
Operário	2
Felgueiras 1932	4
15 October 2017
Santa Clara	2
Belenenses	1
15 October 2017
Fátima	0
Chaves	3
13 October 2017
Lusitano Évora	0
Porto	6
15 October 2017
Moura	0 (6)
Portimonense (p)	0 (7)
14 October 2017
Vasco Gama	1
Vitória de Guimarães	6
14 October 2017
Académico de Viseu	0 (3)
Feirense (p)	0 (4)
15 October 2017
AD Oliveirense (p)	0 (5)
Torreense	0 (4)
14 October 2017
Torcatense	0
Marítimo	1
15 October 2017
Amarante	1 (4)
Sporting Ideal (p)	1 (5)
15 October 2017
Cova da Piedade (p)	1 (4)
Anadia	1 (3)
12 October 2017
Oleiros	2
Sporting CP	4
15 October 2017
Alta Lisboa	0
Famalicão	2
15 October 2017
Vizela	3
Sintrense	1
15 October 2017
Vilaverdense	1
Boavista	0

Fourth Round
18 November 2017
Rio Ave	1
Braga	0
18 November 2017
Benfica	2
Vitória de Setúbal	0
19 November 2017
União da Madeira	4
Freamunde	2
19 November 2017
União de Leiria	0
Desportivo das Aves	3
19 November 2017
Caldas (p)	1 (3)
Arouca	1 (1)
19 November 2017
Académica	1
Nacional	0
19 November 2017
Praiense (a.e.t.)	3
Vilafranquense	2
19 November 2017
Farense	2
Leixões	1
19 November 2017
Moreirense	5
Felgueiras 1932	2
19 November 2017
Santa Clara	2
Chaves	0
17 November 2017
Porto	3
Portimonense	2
19 November 2017
Vitória de Guimarães	2
Feirense	1
19 November 2017
AD Oliveirense	2
Marítimo (a.e.t.)	3
19 November 2017
Sporting Ideal	1
Cova da Piedade	4
16 November 2017
Sporting CP	2
Famalicão	0
19 November 2017
Vizela	2 (2)
Vilaverdense (p)	2 (4)

Fifth Round
13 December 2017
Rio Ave (a.e.t.)	3
Benfica	2
13 December 2017
União da Madeira	1
Desportivo das Aves	5
30 December 2017
Caldas (p)	1 (4)
Académica	1 (2)
13 December 2017
Praiense	0
Farense	1
13 December 2017
Moreirense (p)	2 (6)
Santa Clara	2 (5)
14 December 2017
Porto	4
Vitória de Guimarães	0
6 December 2017
Marítimo	0 (2)
Cova da Piedade (p)	0 (4)
13 December 2017
Sporting CP	4
Vilaverdense	0

Quarter-finals
10 January 2018
Rio Ave	4 (4)
Desportivo das Aves (p)	4 (5)
10 January 2018
Caldas (a.e.t.)	3
Farense	2
11 January 2018
Moreirense	1
Porto	2
10 January 2018
Cova da Piedade	1
Sporting CP	2

Semi-finals
28 February/18 April 2018
Desportivo das Aves (a.e.t.)	1	2	3
Caldas	0	1	1
7 February/18 April 2018
Porto	1	0 (4)	5
Sporting CP (p)	0	1 (5)	15

Final
20 May 2018
Desportivo das Aves	2
Sporting CP	1
