= José Mota (footballer, born 1964) =

Portuguese football manager and former player (born 1964)

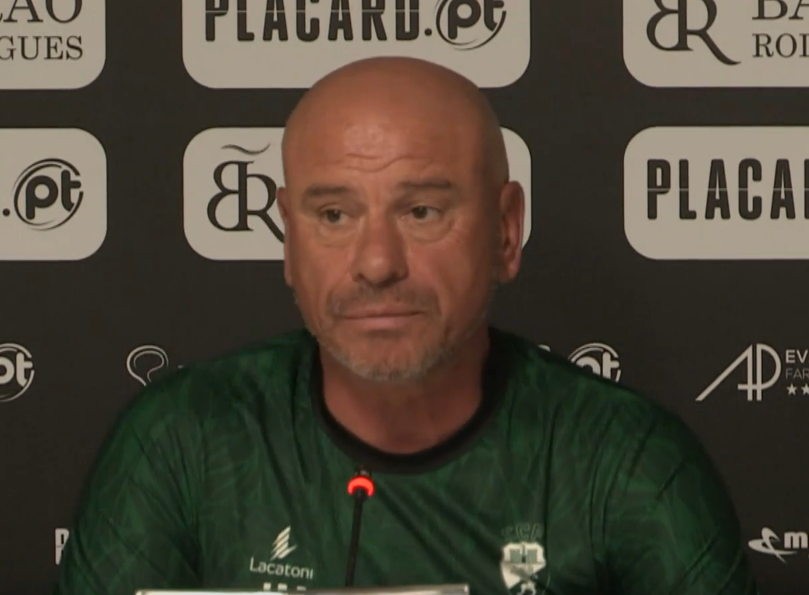
- Mota in 2023

Personal information
- Full name: José Albano Ferreira da Mota
- Date of birth: 25 February 1964 (age 62)
- Place of birth: Paredes, Portugal
- Height: 1.75 m (5 ft 9 in)
- Position: Defender

Youth career
- 1978–1980: Aliados Lordelo
- 1980–1982: Porto

Senior career*
Years	Team	Apps	(Gls)
1982–1987	Aliados Lordelo		
1987–1996	Paços Ferreira	196	(3)

Managerial career
- 1996–2000: Paços Ferreira (assistant)
- 1997: Paços Ferreira (caretaker)
- 2000–2003: Paços Ferreira
- 2003: Santa Clara
- 2003–2008: Paços Ferreira
- 2008–2010: Leixões
- 2010–2012: Belenenses
- 2012–2013: Vitória Setúbal
- 2014–2015: Gil Vicente
- 2016: Feirense
- 2017: Aves
- 2017: Sfaxien
- 2018–2019: Aves
- 2019: Chaves
- 2021–2022: Leixões
- 2022: Paços Ferreira
- 2023–2024: Farense
- 2025: Leixões
- 2025: AVS
- * Club domestic league appearances and goals

José Albano Ferreira da Mota (born 25 February 1964) is a Portuguese retired footballer who played mainly as a right-back, currently a manager.

He spent most of his playing career with Paços de Ferreira, where he also began working as a coach and won two Segunda Liga titles. In two decades as a manager, he led eight teams in the Primeira Liga, and won the Taça de Portugal for Aves in 2018.

== Football career ==
=== Playing career and first Paços stint ===
Mota was born in Paredes, Porto District. After humble beginnings with Aliados Lordelo F.C. in the outskirts of his birthplace, he went on to spend nearly a decade at F.C. Paços de Ferreira, often leading the club as its captain. After retiring, he immediately joined their coaching staff, being promoted to head manager in 2000. In 2003, he had a short stint with C.D. Santa Clara in the Azores, but returned to Paços shortly after.

In the 2006–07 season, Mota led Paços de Ferreira to the UEFA Cup for the first time after a sixth-place finish in the league. The northerners would subsequently lose in the first round of the European competition against AZ Alkmaar, 1–0 on aggregate.

=== Primeira Liga regular ===
In July 2008, Mota left Paços and joined Leixões S.C. also in the Primeira Liga. On 9 February 2010, with the Matosinhos team ranking second-bottom, he was sacked.

Mota returned to active in November 2010, being appointed at C.F. Os Belenenses who was struggling in the Segunda Liga and eventually narrowly avoided relegation. Between February 2012 and October of the following year, he coached Vitória F.C. in the top division.

On 2 September 2014, Mota was hired by Gil Vicente F.C. as a replacement to João de Deus, fired after three losses in as many top-flight games. On 25 March 2016, after a period of inactivity, he signed with second tier club C.D. Feirense, leading it to promotion after four years and being relieved of his duties in December of the same year.

Mota was appointed at C.D. Aves on 18 February 2017, achievement another promotion to the Portuguese top division but leaving subsequently by mutual consent. The 53-year-old moved abroad for the first time in late June, signing a two-year contract with CS Sfaxien from the Tunisian Ligue Professionnelle 1 and leading them to the quarter-finals of the CAF Confederation Cup.

=== Primeira return and Aves cup win ===
Mota returned to both Portugal and Aves on 24 January 2018, replacing the suspended Lito Vidigal as well as being appointed senior football and youth system coordinator. On 18 April, he took the club to its first-ever final of the Taça de Portugal after disposing of lowly Caldas S.C. 3–1 on aggregate, defeating Sporting CP 2–1 in the decisive match.

On 16 January 2019, Mota left Aves by mutual consent after their elimination from the quarter-finals of the cup by S.C. Braga. He returned to the league on 10 March at G.D. Chaves on a deal until 2020, and reiterated his commitment to the club after they were relegated on the last day of the season with a 5–2 defeat to C.D. Tondela; he managed his 400th game in Portugal's main tier on 21 April, a 2–2 draw against B-SAD.

On 19 December 2019, with the team in eighth, Mota's contract was terminated and he was replaced by César Peixoto. Thirteen months later, he was back at work at 16th-placed Leixões, after over a decade away.

Mota returned to Paços for a third stint on 18 October 2022, after Peixoto was dismissed with the side 17th and no wins from nine matches. He left by mutual consent within two months, having lost all four league games and drawn two of three in the Taça da Liga.

On 6 February 2023, Mota succeeded Vasco Faísca at S.C. Farense. He led the team to second place behind Moreirense FC; it was his fifth promotion to the top flight, second only to the ten by Vítor Oliveira, and he renewed his contract for one more year.

On 24 September 2024, after losing the first six fixtures of the new top-tier season, Mota left by mutual agreement.

== Managerial statistics ==
As of match played 22 September 2024

Managerial record by team and tenure
Team	Nat	From	To	Record				
Team	Nat	From	To	G	W	D	L	Win %
Paços Ferreira (caretaker)	(Portugal)	4 November 1997	24 November 1997	2	0	0	2	0.00
Paços Ferreira	(Portugal)	8 February 2000	29 June 2003	127	55	34	38	43.31
Santa Clara	(Portugal)	30 June 2003	21 October 2003	9	2	6	1	22.22
Paços Ferreira	(Portugal)	21 October 2003	16 May 2008	166	56	45	65	33.73
Leixões	(Portugal)	22 May 2008	9 February 2010	59	18	16	25	30.51
Belenenses	(Portugal)	2 November 2010	14 February 2012	51	18	15	18	35.29
Vitória Setúbal	(Portugal)	15 February 2012	7 October 2013	56	16	11	29	28.57
Gil Vicente	(Portugal)	2 September 2014	28 May 2015	40	7	13	20	17.50
Feirense	(Portugal)	25 March 2016	20 December 2016	27	9	7	11	33.33
Aves	(Portugal)	20 February 2017	22 May 2017	14	8	4	2	57.14
Sfaxien	(Tunisia)	24 June 2017	10 November 2017	9	6	2	1	66.67
Aves	(Portugal)	24 January 2018	16 January 2019	44	16	8	20	36.36
Chaves	(Portugal)	10 March 2019	19 December 2019	29	14	4	11	48.28
Leixões	(Portugal)	7 January 2021	30 June 2022	52	21	12	19	40.38
Paços Ferreira	(Portugal)	18 October 2022	15 December 2022	7	0	2	5	0.00
Farense	(Portugal)	6 February 2023	24 September 2024	60	23	9	28	38.33
Total				752	269	188	295	35.77

== Honours ==
=== Manager ===
Paços Ferreira

- Segunda Liga: 1999–2000, 2004–05

Aves

- Taça de Portugal: 2017–18
