= 2018 Taça de Portugal final =

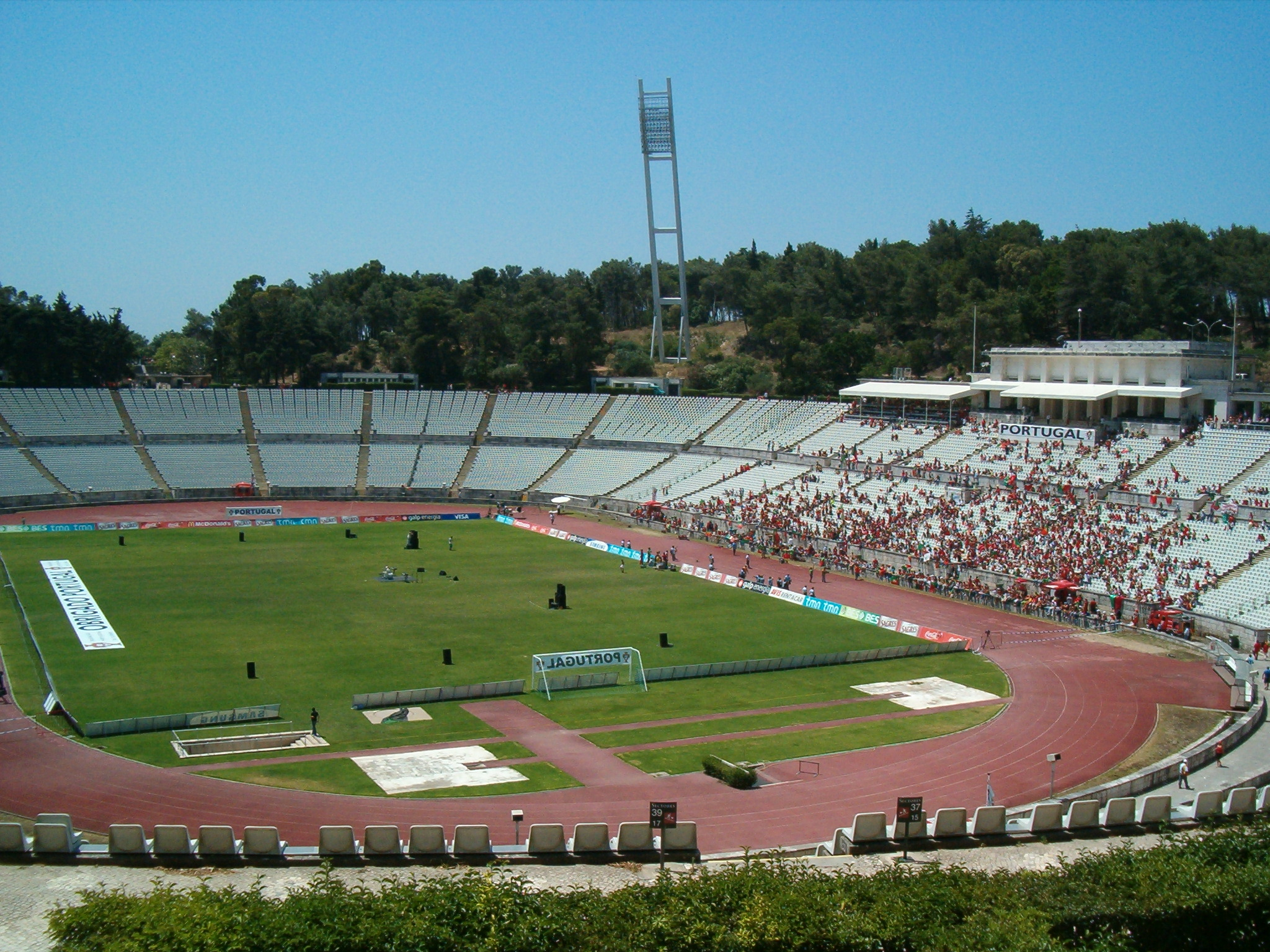
- Estádio Nacional
- Event: 2017–18 Taça de Portugal
Desportivo das Aves	Sporting CP
2	1
- Date: 20 May 2018
- Venue: Estádio Nacional, Oeiras
- Man of the Match: Alexandre Guedes (Desportivo das Aves)
- Fair Player of the Match: Quim (Desportivo das Aves)
- Referee: Tiago Martins
- Attendance: 35,890

The 2018 Taça de Portugal final was the last match of the 2017–18 Taça de Portugal, which decided the winner of the 78th season of the Taça de Portugal. It was played on 20 May 2018 at the Estádio Nacional in Oeiras, between Desportivo das Aves and Sporting CP. This was the first appearance for Desportivo das Aves in a Taça de Portugal final. The match was won by Desportivo das Aves.

== Route to the final ==
Desportivo das Aves		Round	Sporting CP
Opponent	Result	2017–18 Taça de Portugal	Opponent	Result
Vila Real	1–0 (A)	Third round	Oleiros	4–2 (A)
União de Leiria	3–0 (A)	Fourth round	Famalicão	2–0 (H)
União da Madeira	5–1 (A)	Fifth round	Vilaverdense	4–0 (H)
Rio Ave	4–4 (5–4 pen.) (A)	Quarter-finals	Cova da Piedade	2–1 (A)
Caldas	1–0 (H)	Semi-finals	Porto	0–1 (A)
Caldas	2–1 (a.e.t.) (A)	Semi-finals	Porto	1-0 (5–4 pen.) (H)

Note: H = home fixture, A = away fixture

== Match ==
=== Details ===
20 May 2018
17:15 WEST

Desportivo das Aves	2–1	Sporting CP
Guedes 16', 72'		Montero 85'

Estádio Nacional, Oeiras
Attendance: 35,890
Referee: Tiago Martins

Desportivo das Aves	Sporting CP

GK	1	(Portugal) Quim (c)
RB	2	(Brazil) Rodrigo Soares
CB	26	(Cape Verde) Carlos Ponck	(yellow card) 60'
CB	44	(Brazil) Diego Galo
LB	21	(Portugal) Nélson Lenho
DM	15	(Argentina) Fernando Tissone
CM	30	(Portugal) Vítor Gomes	(yellow card) 68'
AM	19	(Portugal) Bruno Braga		(substituted off) 71'
RW	23	(Brazil) Amilton	(yellow card) 43'	(substituted off) 75'
LW	16	(Brazil) Nildo Petrolina	(yellow card) 90'	(substituted off) 90+1'
CF	7	(Portugal) Alexandre Guedes
Substitutes:
GK	83	(Brazil) Adriano Facchini
MF	11	(Argentina) Luis Fariña
MF	29	(Brazil) Claudio Falcão		(substituted on) 71'
FW	33	(Brazil) Derley
DF	46	(Brazil) Jorge Fellipe		(substituted on) 90+1'
DF	50	(Guinea-Bissau) Mama Baldé	(yellow card) 82'	(substituted on) 75'
MF	73	(Libya) Hamdou Elhouni
Manager:
(Portugal) José Mota

GK	1	(Portugal) Rui Patrício (c)
RB	13	(North Macedonia) Stefan Ristovski
CB	4	(Uruguay) Sebastián Coates
CB	22	(France) Jérémy Mathieu
LB	5	(Portugal) Fábio Coentrão		(substituted off) 63'
DM	14	(Portugal) William Carvalho		(substituted off) 46'
CM	16	(Argentina) Rodrigo Battaglia
AM	8	(Portugal) Bruno Fernandes
RW	77	(Portugal) Gelson Martins
LW	9	(Argentina) Marcos Acuña	(yellow card) 82'
CF	28	(Netherlands) Bas Dost
Substitutes:
GK	18	(France) Romain Salin
MF	7	(Portugal) Rúben Ribeiro
DF	15	(Ghana) Lumor Agbenyenu
MF	25	(Serbia) Radosav Petrović
MF	27	(Croatia) Josip Mišić		(substituted on) 63'
MF	37	(Brazil) Wendel
FW	40	(Colombia) Fredy Montero		(substituted on) 46'
Manager:
(Portugal) Jorge Jesus

== See also ==
- 2017–18 Sporting CP season
- 2018 Taça da Liga final
