= André Santos (disambiguation) =

André Santos may refer to:

- André Santos (fighter) (born 1981), Brazilian mixed martial artist
- André Santos (footballer, born 1975), Brazilian footballer
- André Luís Alves Santos (born 1972), Brazilian football forward
- André Santos (born 1983), Brazilian footballer
- André Alves dos Santos (born 1983), Brazilian footballer
- André Santos (footballer, born 1988), Portuguese footballer
- André Bahia dos Santos Viana (born 1983), Brazilian footballer
- André Santos (footballer, born 1989), Portuguese footballer

== See also ==
- Santo André, São Paulo
