= Luther King =

Luther King may refer to:

- Martin Luther King Jr., an American Baptist minister and civil rights activist from 1954 through 1968
- Martin Simões, a Portuguese footballer

== See also ==
- Martin Luther King (disambiguation)
