= André Perre =

Portuguese footballer

Personal information
- Full name: André António Filipe Agostinho Perre
- Date of birth: 7 November 1989 (age 37)
- Place of birth: Alcobaça, Portugal
- Height: 1.80 m (5 ft 11 in)
- Position: Midfielder

Team information
- Current team: Beneditense

Youth career
- 2002–2006: Beneditense
- 2006–2007: União de Leiria
- 2007–2008: Rio Maior

Senior career*
Years	Team	Apps	(Gls)
2008–2009	Rio Maior		
2009–2012	Peniche		
2012–2013	Torreense	30	(4)
2013	Fátima	13	(4)
2014–2016	União de Leiria	71	(10)
2016–2018	Famalicão	30	(2)
2017–2018	→ Merelinense (loan)	29	(5)
2018–2019	Torreense	32	(1)
2019–2020	Marinhense	25	(2)
2020–2024	Caldas	97	(6)
2024–	Beneditense	0	(0)
- * Club domestic league appearances and goals as of 4 May 2024

André António Filipe Agostinho Perre (born 7 November 1989) is a Portuguese football player who plays for Beneditense.

== Career ==
He made his professional debut in the Segunda Liga for Famalicão on 6 August 2016 in a game against Leixões.
