= João Mário =

João Mário may refer to:

== Footballers ==
- João Mário (footballer, born 1966) (João Mário Ferreira Oliveira), Portuguese midfielder
- João Mário (footballer, born January 1993) (João Mário Naval da Costa Eduardo), Portuguese international midfielder
- João Mário (footballer, born October 1993) (João Mário Nunes Fernandes), Bissau-Guinean international forward
- João Mário (footballer, born 2000) (João Mário Neto Lopes), Portuguese international right-back/winger

== Others ==
- João Mário Grilo (born 1958), Portuguese film director
