= Vítor Gomes =

Portuguese footballer

Personal information
- Full name: Vítor Hugo Gomes da Silva
- Date of birth: 25 December 1987 (age 38)
- Place of birth: Vila do Conde, Portugal
- Height: 1.81 m (5 ft 11 in)
- Position: Defensive midfielder

Youth career
- 1998–2005: Rio Ave

Senior career*
Years	Team	Apps	(Gls)
2005–2013	Rio Ave	129	(4)
2008	→ Cagliari (loan)	0	(0)
2013	→ Videoton (loan)	11	(0)
2013–2014	Videoton	23	(1)
2014–2016	Moreirense	47	(6)
2015	→ Balıkesirspor (loan)	13	(0)
2016–2017	Belenenses	28	(0)
2017–2019	Aves	57	(5)
2019–2021	Omonia	34	(1)
2021–2025	Rio Ave	70	(2)
Total		412	(19)

International career
2006–2007	Portugal U20	8	(0)
2007	Portugal U21	1	(0)
- * Club domestic league appearances and goals

Vítor Hugo Gomes da Silva (born 25 December 1987), known as Gomes, is a Portuguese former professional footballer who played as a defensive midfielder.

He achieved Primeira Liga totals of 269 games and 15 goals over 14 seasons, for Rio Ave (two spells), Moreirense, Belenenses and Aves. He also played in Hungary, Turkey and Cyprus.

Gomes represented Portugal at the 2007 FIFA U-20 World Cup.

== Club career ==
Born in Vila do Conde and a product of hometown club Rio Ave FC's youth system, Gomes first appeared with the first team on 19 March 2006, starting in a 0–1 home loss against S.L. Benfica. In late January 2008, he began an unsuccessful loan spell at Serie A's Cagliari Calcio, making no appearances and returning to Rio Ave in July. During that season, he also played 13 matches (12 starts) as they returned to the Primeira Liga after an absence of two years.

In the following top-division campaigns, Gomes was regularly used by Rio Ave. He scored his first goals in 2009–10, against C.D. Nacional (2–0, home) and S.C. Olhanense (1–5 defeat, also at the Estádio dos Arcos).

In January 2013, Gomes joined a host of compatriots at Videoton FC, with the Hungarians making the deal permanent in early June. Two years later, he was loaned to Balıkesirspor in the Turkish Süper Lig by Moreirense FC.

Gomes continued to compete in the Portuguese top tier in the following years, with C.F. Os Belenenses and C.D. Aves. On 18 April 2018, he scored twice in a 2–1 away victory over Caldas S.C. in the semi-finals of the Taça de Portugal to take the latter club to its first ever final in the competition. He also played the full 90 minutes in the decisive match against Sporting CP, providing an assist to Alexandre Guedes in the 2–1 win in Lisbon.

On 1 October 2018, Gomes scored a hat-trick, his only goals of the season, in a 3–0 home defeat of Portimonense SC. He moved abroad again the following 2 July, on a free transfer to AC Omonia of the Cypriot First Division for two years. During his time in Nicosia, he won a league title in 2020–21.

Gomes returned to Rio Ave on 1 July 2021, signing a two-year deal with the option of a third. The team won promotion as champions in his first season back, and he scored the only goal of a home winner over title rivals Casa Pia A.C. with two games remaining.

Gomes announced his retirement on 10 August 2025, aged 37. He continued to work with his last club subsequently.

== International career ==
Gomes was a member of the Portugal under-20 squad at the 2007 FIFA World Cup. Later that year, in August, he received his first callup to the under-21s; he won his only cap for the latter on the 21st, playing the second half of the 3–0 friendly win against Malta held in his hometown.

== Personal life ==
Gomes' older brother, José, was also a footballer. A defender, he represented several clubs, and the pair shared teams in Rio Ave (2005–06, 2009–12).

== Career statistics ==
As of 17 May 2024

Club	Season	League			National Cup		League Cup		Continental		Other		Total	
Club	Season	Division	Apps	Goals	Apps	Goals	Apps	Goals	Apps	Goals	Apps	Goals	Apps	Goals
Rio Ave	2005–06	Primeira Liga	8	0	—		—		—		—		8	0
Rio Ave	2006–07	Segunda Liga	22	0	0	0	0	0	—		—		22	0
Rio Ave	2007–08	Segunda Liga	13	0	0	0	0	0	—		—		22	0
Rio Ave	2008–09	Primeira Liga	11	0	0	0	5	0	—		—		16	0
Rio Ave	2009–10	Primeira Liga	23	2	4	0	2	0	—		—		29	2
Rio Ave	2010–11	Primeira Liga	18	0	0	0	0	0	—		—		18	0
Rio Ave	2011–12	Primeira Liga	24	2	2	0	2	0	—		—		28	2
Rio Ave	2012–13	Primeira Liga	10	0	1	0	4	0	—		—		15	0
Rio Ave	Total		129	4	7	0	13	0	—		—		149	4
Cagliari (loan)	2007–08	Serie A	0	0	0	0	—		—		—		0	0
Videoton (loan)	2012–13	Nemzeti Bajnokság I	11	0	2	0	—		—		—		13	0
Videoton	2013–14	Nemzeti Bajnokság I	23	1	2	0	—		2	0	—		27	1
Moreirense	2014–15	Primeira Liga	16	3	2	0	2	0	—		—		20	3
Moreirense	2015–16	Primeira Liga	31	3	1	0	1	0	—		—		33	3
Moreirense	Total		47	6	3	0	3	0	—		—		53	6
Balıkesirspor (loan)	2014–15	Süper Lig	13	0	—		—		—		—		13	0
Belenenses	2016–17	Primeira Liga	28	0	0	0	3	0	—		—		31	0
Aves	2017–18	Primeira Liga	28	2	5	3	0	0	—		—		33	5
Aves	2018–19	Primeira Liga	29	3	4	1	4	0	—		1	0	38	4
Aves	Total		57	5	9	4	4	0	—		1	0	71	9
Omonia	2019–20	Cypriot First Division	19	1	2	0	—		—		—		21	1
Omonia	2020–21	Cypriot First Division	15	0	2	0	—		10	0	—		27	0
Omonia	Total		34	1	4	0	—		10	0	0	0	48	1
Rio Ave	2021–22	Liga Portugal 2	27	2	5	0	4	0	—		—		36	2
Rio Ave	2022–23	Primeira Liga	20	0	1	1	2	0	—		—		23	1
Rio Ave	2023–24	Primeira Liga	17	0	0	0	1	0	—		—		18	0
Rio Ave	Total		64	2	6	1	7	0	—		—		77	3
Career total			406	19	33	5	30	0	12	0	1	0	482	24

== Honours ==
Aves

- Taça de Portugal: 2017–18

Omonia

- Cypriot First Division: 2020–21

Rio Ave

- Liga Portugal 2: 2021–22
