= Isaac Monteiro =

Portuguese footballer (born 2000)

Personal information
- Full name: Isaac Bernardo Neto Monteiro
- Date of birth: 4 March 2004 (age 22)
- Place of birth: Lisbon, Portugal
- Height: 1.93 m (6 ft 4 in)
- Position: Centre-back

Team information
- Current team: Caldas

Youth career
- 2012–2013: U.D.R. Algés
- 2013–2014: Belenenses
- 2014–2016: Benfica
- 2016–2017: Belenenses
- 2017–2019: Sporting CP
- 2019–2022: Belenenses
- 2022–2023: Casa Pia

Senior career*
Years	Team	Apps	(Gls)
2023–2025	Casa Pia	1	(0)
2024	→ Covilhã (loan)	6	(0)
2025–2026	Anadia	4	(0)
2026–	Caldas	0	(0)

International career
2021	Portugal U18	3	(0)
- * Club domestic league appearances and goals as of 13 September 2026

Isaac Bernardo Neto Monteiro (born 4 March 2004) is a Portuguese footballer who plays as a centre-back for Liga 3 club Caldas.

== Club career ==
Monteiro is a youth product of U.D.R. Algés, Belenenses, Benfica, and Sporting CP. On 30 June 2022, he signed a professional contract with Casa Pia. He made his professional debut with Casa Pia in a 2–1 Taça da Liga win over C.D. Nacional on 28 September 2023. On 1 February 2024, he was loaned to Covilhã for the second half of the 2023–24 season in the Liga 3.

== International career ==
Born in Portugal, Monteiro is of Santomean descent. He was called up to the Portugal U18s in 2021.
