= Church of Nossa Senhora de Guadalupe =

Church of Nossa Senhora da Guadalupe
- Church of Our Lady of Guadalupe
- Igreja de Nossa Senhora da Guadalupe
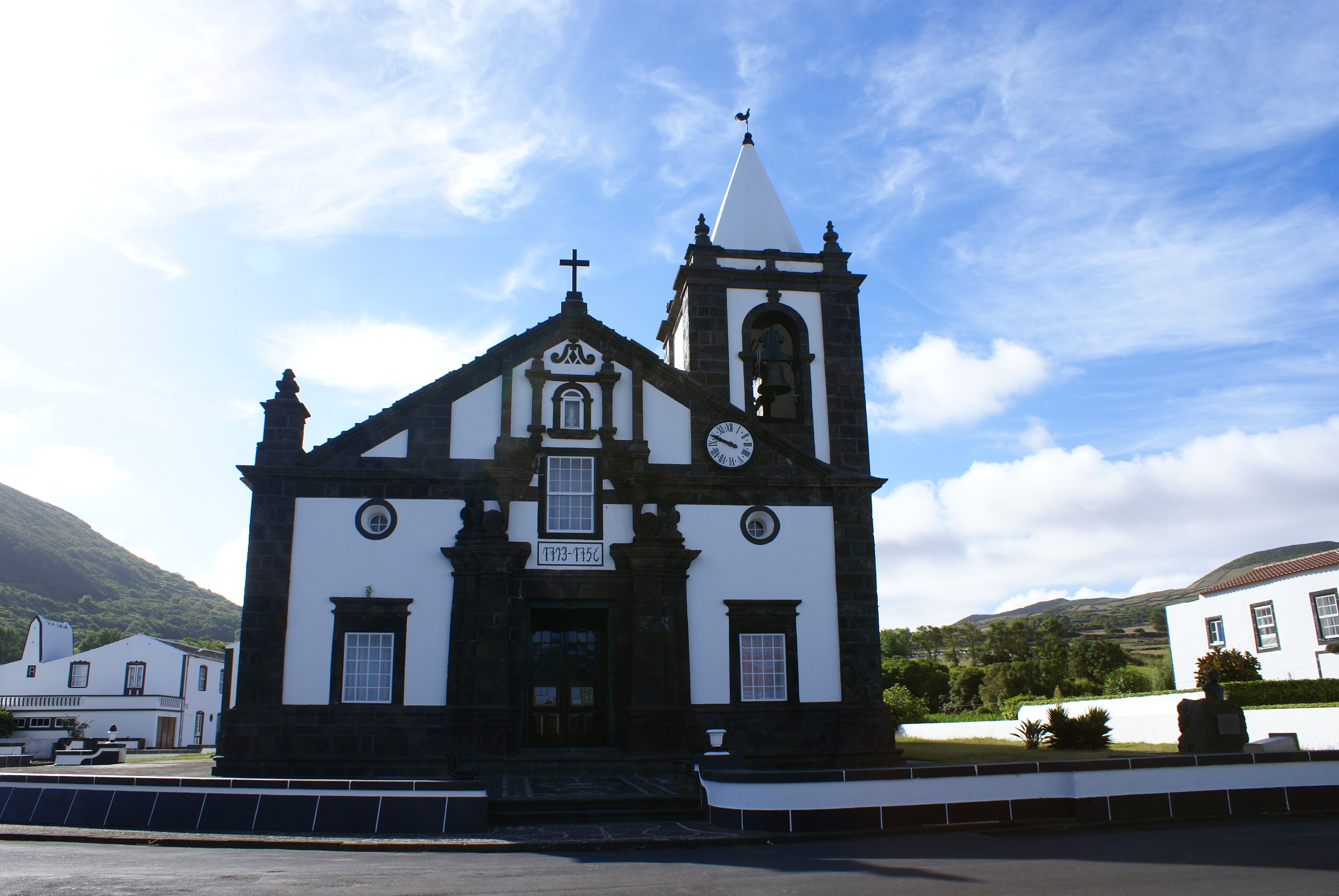
- The facade of the parochial church of Guadalupe
- Church of Nossa Senhora da Guadalupe
- 39°3′39.8″N 28°1′17.3″W
- Location: Graciosa, Central
- Country: Portugal

History
- Dedication: Virgin Mary

Architecture
- Style: Baroque, Mannerist

Administration
- Diocese: Diocese of Angra

The Church of Nossa Senhora do Guadalupe (Portuguese: Igreja de Nossa Senhora do Guadalupe), is a Portuguese church in the civil parish of Guadalupe, in the municipality of Santa Cruz da Graciosa, on the island of Graciosa in the archipelago of the Azores.

== History ==
In the 16th century, a hermitage was constructed to shelter an image brought from Mexico by Domingos Pires da Covilhã, one of the early settlers in the area.

By 1602, the area was elevated to the status of ecclesiastical parish, under the invocation of Nossa Senhora de Guadalupe (Our Lady of Guadalupe). It was in 1644, though, that the southwest corner of Santa Cruz da Graciosa was disaggregated to form the administrative parish territory.

Following decades of activity, and with the growth of the resident population, it was decided that a newer, larger temple was needed to support the community. On 15 May 1713, the church foundations were opened to the public, with the consecration of the cornerstone occurring on 22 May. As a consequence of the 1717 volcanic earthquake event, which destroyed much of the parish, the construction of the church was delayed, with worked resuming on the main nave around September 1754. The first mass was held on 5 August 1765, with the movement of the Holy Sacrament and many of the images.

The seismic crisis resulted in the popular decision to hold an annual Procissão dos abalos (Procession of the Concussion/Aftershocks), with the image of Our Lady of Guadalupe moved between the parochial church and mount overlooking the village of Santa Cruz. As a result, the patrons' celebrations occurred annually on the first week of August. On arrival there would be a mass, before the image would return to the parochial church by procession. Although diminishing over time, following the 1980 Azores earthquake on 1 January, the procession became a popular event.

The building was repaired in the late 20th century, through the investment of the regional government, which invested €42,408 into its restoration. The restoration was concluded in 2010.

== Architecture ==
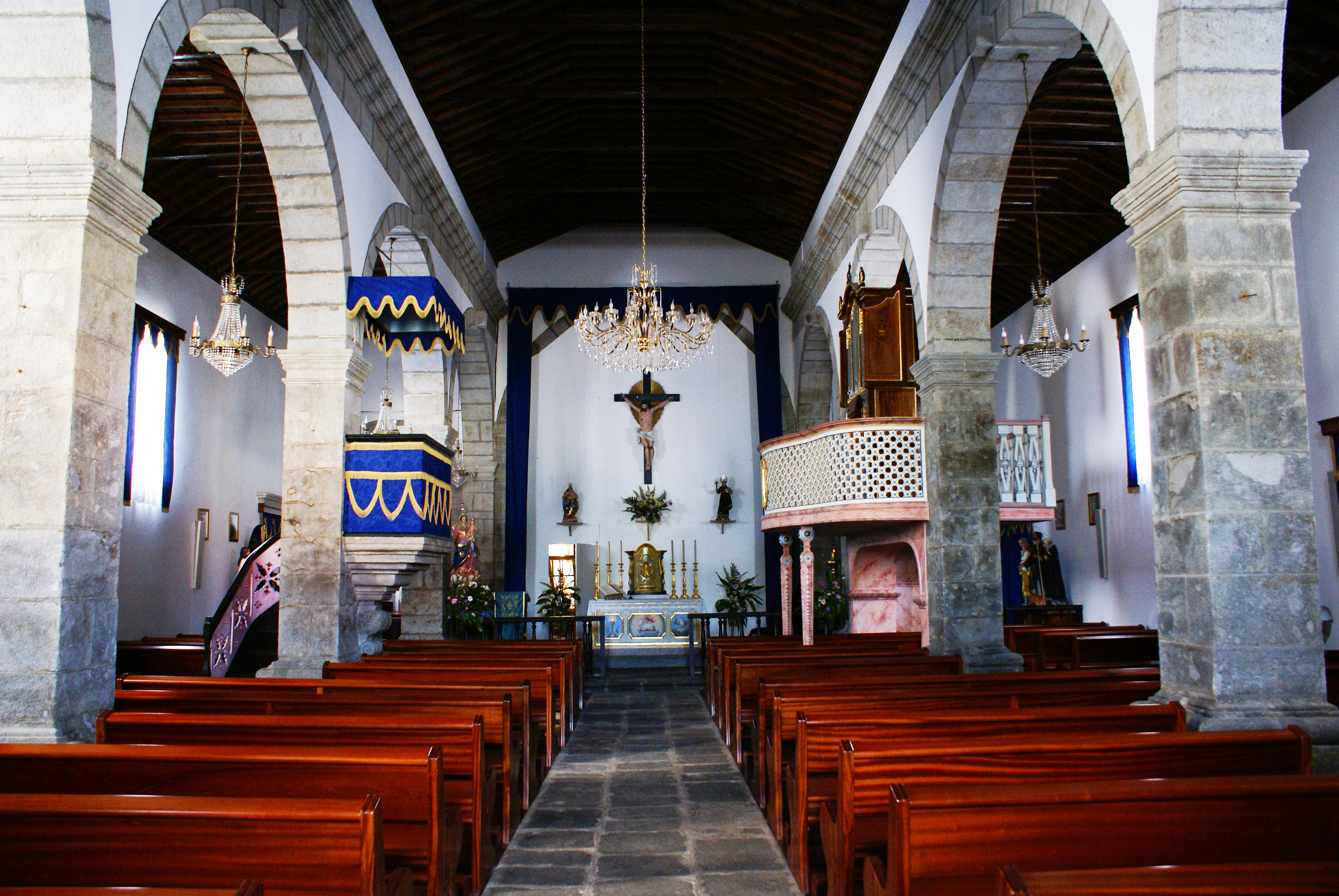
The central nave of the church of Guadalupe

The church is located in the middle of the settlement, implanted in the heart of the Courelas plain, a zone of fertile lands on the island. It is situated at the crossroads, within the walking distance of the main Império of Our Lady of Guadalupe, along the Caminho da Igreja.

The three-nave church is located on level churchyard ground and bordered by a murete accompanying the curve of an intersection. It is composed of a high, rectangular body, which corresponds to the principal nave and an inverted "T" body corresponding to the chapels at the head, the sacristy (on the side of the gospel) and the annex (in side of the epistle). There is another angle attachment in the chancel with the side and the attachment of the side of the epistle. The single tower is enclosed in the main body of the rectangle.

The facade of the parish includes a triangular pediment with clock.

The main altar is marked by the image of Our Lady of Guadalupe, flanked by Our Lady of Fatima (to the right) and Our Lady of Mount Carmel (to the left).

The temple includes an organ constructed by Portuguese artist José Leandros da Cunha, and dates from 1775, being the second oldest in the archipelago. It includes 360 tubes and 47 grades, and was restored in the offices of Manuel Dinarte Machado in Mafra.
