= Diogo Izata =

Portuguese footballer

Personal information
- Full name: Diogo Marques Izata Pereira
- Date of birth: 6 January 1997 (age 29)
- Place of birth: Alvaiázere, Portugal
- Height: 1.78 m (5 ft 10 in)
- Position: Midfielder

Team information
- Current team: Caldas
- Number: 6

Youth career
- 2006–2013: União Leiria
- 2014–2015: Porto
- 2015–2016: Braga

Senior career*
Years	Team	Apps	(Gls)
2016–2021	Vilafranquense	146	(2)
2021–2022	Gaz Metan Mediaș	12	(0)
2022	→ Koper (loan)	8	(0)
2022–2023	Brașov	18	(1)
2023	Gloria Buzău	9	(0)
2024	CSM Alexandria	8	(0)
2024–2025	Anadia	13	(0)
2025–2026	Anadia	7	(0)
2026–	Caldas	5	(0)

International career
2012–2013	Portugal U16	8	(0)
2013–2014	Portugal U17	11	(0)
- * Club domestic league appearances and goals as of 13 September 2026

Diogo Marques Izata Pereira (born 6 January 1997) is a Portuguese professional footballer who plays as a midfielder for Liga 3 club Caldas.

== Career ==
Izata made his Taça da Liga debut for Vilafranquense on 28 July 2019 in a game against Casa Pia.

== Honours ==
Koper

- Slovenian Cup: 2021–22
