= Pedro de Merelim =

Portuguese historian and ethnographer

- Born: Joaquim Gomes da Cunha; July 11, 1913; São Pedro de Merelim, Braga, Portugal
- Died: November 27, 2001 (aged 88); Angra do Heroísmo (Azores)
- Occupation: Historian/Ethnographer
- Writing career
- Language: Portuguese
- Period: 1948-2001
- Genres: History, Geography, Ethnography
- Subjects: Azores, history, ethnography

Pedro de Merelim was a pseudonym of the Portuguese historian and ethnographer Joaquim Gomes da Cunha (1913 in São Pedro de Merelim, Portugal – 2001 in Angra do Heroísmo, Azores).

He was born in the civil parish of São Pedro de Merelim in the municipality of Braga.

He signed-on with the Corpo Expedicionário (Expeditionary Corp) that travelled to the archipelago during the Second World War, and later settled in Angra do Heroísmo, where he became an important investigator, into works of history and local traditions/culture, publishing several volumes on these themes.

== Published works ==
- Guia Turístico da Terceira, Terceira Touristic Guide Agência Teles, Angra do Heroísmo, 1948.
- Subsídios para a história do futebol na ilha Terceira (Subsidiaries for the Soccer History of the Island of Terceira, Angra do Heroísmo, 1956.
- Asilo de Mendicidade, sumário histórico no 1.°centenário da fundação, Angra do Heroísmo, 1960.
- Notas sobre os conventos da ilha Terceira, 3 volumes, A União, 1960, 1963 e 1964.
- Memória histórica da edificação dos Paços do Conselho, Câmara Municipal de Angra do Heroísmo, 1966 (reeditado em 1973 e em 1984).
- Os Hebraicos na ilha Terceira, revista Atlântida (1968), reeditado pelo autor em 1995.
- Filarmónica recreio dos Artistas, edição da Filarmónica, Angra do Heroísmo, 1967.
- Caixa económica da Santa Casa da Misericórdia de Angra, Santa Casa da Misericórdia de Angra, 1971.
- Toiros e touradas na ilha Terceira, União Gráfica Angrense, 1970.
- Memória histórica do Salão Municipal, Câmara Municipal de Angra do Heroísmo, 1970.
- Rádio Clube de Angra, 192 pp., edição do Radio Clube de Angra, Angra do Heroísmo, 1972.
- As 18 paróquias de Angra (The 18 Parishes of Angra), 874 pp., Câmara Municipal de Angra do Heroísmo, 1974.
- Fernado Pessoa e a ilha Terceira (Fernando Pessoa and the Island of Terceira), 123 pp., Colecção Ínsula (Insular Collection), Angra do Heroísmo, 1975.
- A laranja na ilha Terceira (The Orange from the Island of Terceira), 91 pp., inserto em A União, 1976.
- Serviços Municipalizados de Angra (Municipalized Services in Angra), 201 pp., Câmara Municipal de Angra do Heroísmo, 1979.
- Cooperativas que houve na Terceira, Angra do Heroismo.
- Freguesias da Praia (Parishes of The Beach), 2 volumes, 797 pp., Direcção Regional de Orientação Pedagógica, Angra do Heroísmo, 1983.
- Merelim (São Pedro), 545 pp., Junta de Freguesia de Merelim, 1989.
- Adenda à Monografia de Merelim (São Pedro) Addenda of the Monograph of Merelim, Junta de Freguesia de Merelim, 1995.
- Açorianos ministros de Estado Azorean Ministers in the State, edição do autor, Angra do Heroísmo, 1996.
- Monografia da Agência Teles, Agência Teles, Angra do Heroísmo, 1996.
