= Miguel Ângelo (footballer, born 1995) =

Portuguese footballer

Personal information
- Full name: Miguel Ângelo da Costa Guimarães
- Date of birth: 3 May 1995 (age 31)
- Place of birth: Trofa, Portugal
- Height: 1.72 m (5 ft 8 in)
- Position: Right-back

Team information
- Current team: Merelinense
- Number: 17

Youth career
- 2002–2014: Trofense

Senior career*
Years	Team	Apps	(Gls)
2014–2015	Trofense	19	(0)
2015	Marítimo B	0	(0)
2015–2016	Trofense	24	(0)
2016–2017	Merelinense	19	(0)
2017–2018	AD Oliveirense	23	(0)
2018	Ideal	2	(0)
2018–2019	Cinfães	15	(1)
2019–2020	Trofense	1	(0)
2020–	Merelinense	20	(1)
- * Club domestic league appearances and goals as of 1 August 2021 (UTC)

Miguel Ângelo da Costa Guimarães (born 3 May 1995) commonly known as Miguel Ângelo, is a Portuguese footballer who plays for Merelinense, as a right-back.

== Career ==
On 30 July 2014, Miguel Ângelo made his professional debut with Trofense in a 2014–15 Taça da Liga match against Beira-Mar.
