= Amilton (footballer, born 1989) =

Brazilian footballer

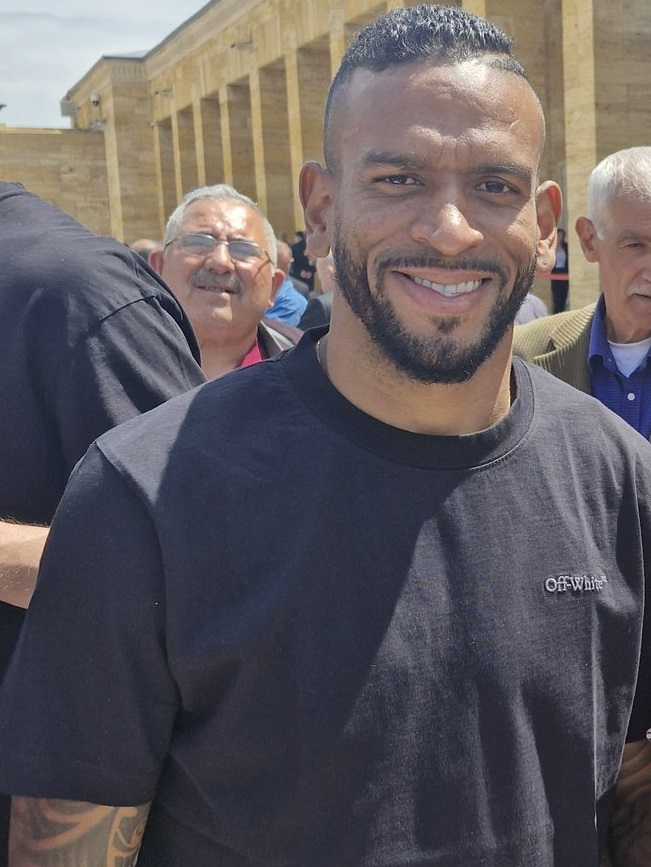
- Amilton with Gençlerbirliği in 2025

Personal information
- Full name: Amilton Minervino da Silva
- Date of birth: 12 August 1989 (age 37)
- Place of birth: Pernambuco, Brazil
- Height: 1.72 m (5 ft 8 in)
- Position: Winger

Team information
- Current team: Sivasspor
- Number: 89

Senior career*
| Years | Team | Apps | (Gls) |
| 2008–2009 | Peladeiros | | |
| 2009–2011 | Ourense B | | |
| 2012–2013 | Valenciano | 5 | (7) |
| 2013–2015 | Varzim | 64 | (13) |
| 2015–2016 | União da Madeira | 31 | (5) |
| 2016–2017 | Portimonense | 22 | (6) |
| 2017 | 1860 Munich | 14 | (0) |
| 2017–2019 | Aves | 44 | (5) |
| 2019 | → Antalyaspor (loan) | 14 | (1) |
| 2019–2022 | Antalyaspor | 81 | (7) |
| 2022–2023 | Konyaspor | 21 | (1) |
| 2023 | Çaykur Rizespor | 13 | (2) |
| 2023–2025 | Gençlerbirliği | 60 | (14) |
| 2025–2026 | Esenler Erokspor | 36 | (4) |
| 2026– | Sivasspor | 8 | (0) |
- * Club domestic league appearances and goals as of 17 October 2026

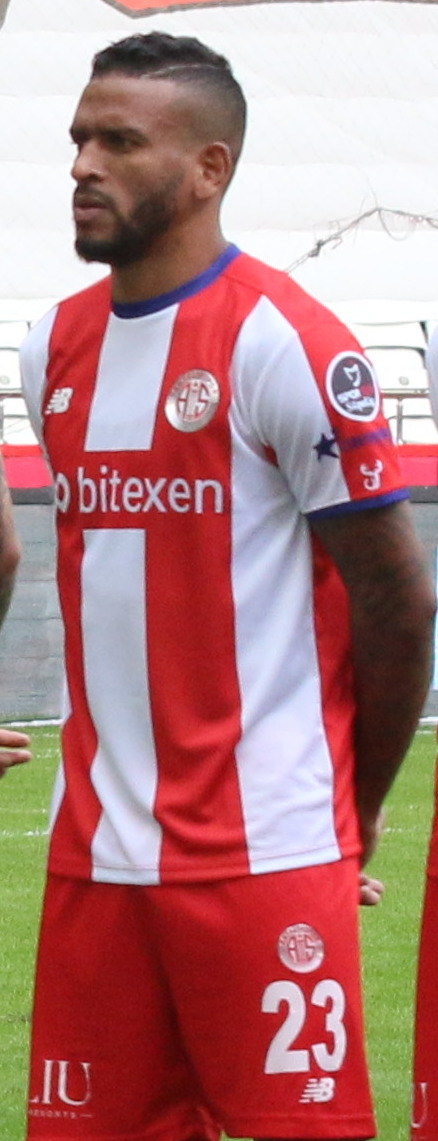
Amilton with Antalyaspor in 2021

Amilton Minervino da Silva (born 12 August 1989), known as Amilton, is a Brazilian professional footballer who plays as a winger for Turkish TFF 1. Lig club Sivasspor.

He spent most of his career in Portugal, where he achieved Primeira Liga totals of 75 games and 9 goals for União da Madeira and Aves, also lifting the Taça de Portugal with the latter in 2018.

== Career ==
Born in Pernambuco, Brazil, Amilton began his career with Sport Club Peladeiros in the Viana do Castelo Football Association's second district league in 2008–09. He then made the short journey over the border to play with CD Ourense B in Spain, then came back to the district's top tier to play for Valenciano. He played two seasons with Varzim S.C. and earned promotion from the third tier at the end of the latter, then signed a three-year deal with newly promoted Primeira Liga club C.F. União in July 2015.

Amilton scored five times as the Madeirans were instantly relegated, including two on 3 April 2016 as they held Vitória F.C. to a 2–2 home draw. He joined LigaPro club Portimonense S.C. that July. Manager Vítor Oliveira led the Algarve side to the title and Amilton contributed a career-best professional haul of six goals, including two on 17 December in a 3–0 home win over S.C. Freamunde.

In January 2017, Portuguese manager Vítor Pereira signed Amilton and Lumor Agbenyenu for 2. Bundesliga club 1860 Munich from Portimonense, with the Brazilian signing until 2020. He did not score as the team suffered relegation from the 2. Bundesliga via the play-offs, and returned to Portugal's top flight in July on a three-year deal at C.D. Aves.

In his debut season in Vila das Aves, Amilton was the top scorer with five goals as the side won the Taça de Portugal, their first major trophy. This included a hat-trick on 13 December 2017 in the last 16, in a 5–1 win at former club União.

In January 2019, after falling out with manager Augusto Inácio, he was loaned to Antalyaspor of the Turkish Süper Lig with an option to buy.

In January 2022, Amilton signed a one-and-a-half-year contract with Konyaspor.

== Honours ==
Aves

- Taça de Portugal: 2017–18
