= Luís Ferraz =

Portuguese footballer

Personal information
- Full name: Eduardo Luís Vieira Ferraz
- Date of birth: 1 April 1987 (age 39)
- Place of birth: Braga, Portugal
- Height: 1.83 m (6 ft 0 in)
- Position: Midfielder

Team information
- Current team: Merelinense

Youth career
- 2000–2006: Merelinense

Senior career*
Years	Team	Apps	(Gls)
2006–2012	Merelinense		
2012–2017	Vizela	159	(34)
2017–	Merelinense	78	(9)
- * Club domestic league appearances and goals as of 1 August 2021

Eduardo Luís Vieira Ferraz, known as Luís Ferraz (born 1 April 1987) is a Portuguese football player who plays for Merelinense.

== Club career ==
He made his professional debut in the Segunda Liga for Vizela on 6 August 2016 in a game against Académico de Viseu.
