= Zé Diogo =

Portuguese footballer

Personal information
- Full name: José Diogo Castro Ferradeira dos Santos
- Date of birth: 9 February 1994 (age 32)
- Place of birth: Póvoa de Varzim, Portugal
- Height: 1.71 m (5 ft 7 in)
- Position: Winger

Team information
- Current team: Marco 09

Youth career
- 2002–2013: Varzim
- 2013: Rio Ave

Senior career*
Years	Team	Apps	(Gls)
2011–2013	Varzim	17	(2)
2013–2014	Tirsense	20	(1)
2014–2015	Vianense	26	(5)
2015–2016	Fafe	31	(6)
2016–2019	Merelinense	48	(4)
2019–2020	Varzim	1	(0)
2020–2022	Merelinense	51	(1)
2022–2023	Fafe	26	(2)
2023–2024	Felgueiras 1932	9	(0)
2024–	Marco 09	9	(0)
- * Club domestic league appearances and goals as of 10 June 2024

José Diogo Castro Ferradeira dos Santos (born 9 February 1994), known as Zé Diogo, is a Portuguese footballer who plays for Marco 09 as a winger.

== Club career ==
Born in Póvoa de Varzim, Zé Diogo developed as a footballer at hometown club Varzim S.C. from the age of 8. He made his professional debut on 21 May 2011 towards the end of a season in which his team were relegated from the Liga de Honra, playing the final ten minutes of a 2–1 home loss against C.F. Os Belenenses as a substitute for Tiago Carneiro. He returned to youth football in January 2013, down the road at Rio Ave FC.

Zé Diogo spent the next few seasons in the third division in service of F.C. Tirsense, SC Vianense, AD Fafe and Merelinense FC. On 11 July 2019, he returned to second-tier Varzim on a two-year deal. Having played just five minutes, he was released in June 2020.
