= Merelinense F.C. =

Portuguese association football club

- Full name: Merelinense Futebol Clube
- Founded: 1938
- Ground: Estádio João Soares Vieira, Braga
- Capacity: 5,000
- Chairman: António Silva
- Manager: Micael Sequeira
- League: Campeonato de Portugal
- 2021–22: Campeonato de Portugal Serie A, 8th (First stage); Relegation Serie A, 2nd (Second stage)
- Website: merelinense.no.sapo.pt
Home colours	Away colours

Merelinense Futebol Clube also known as Merelinense FC is a Portuguese football club from São Pedro de Merelim in Braga and founded in 1938. Merelinense FC currently plays in the Campeonato de Portugal. They currently play their home games at Estádio João Soares Vieira in Braga with a capacity of 5000.

== Achievements ==
- Braga FA Cup – 3: 1977–78, 2013–14, 2015–16
- Braga FA Championship – 6: 1977–78^{^a}, 1981–82^{^a}, 1990–91^{^a}, 1997–98^{^b}, 2003–04^{^b}, 2015–16^{^c}
- Braga Supercup – 1: 2015–16
- Minho Champions Cup – 1: 2015–16

^a Designated as Primeira Divisão
^b Designated as Divisão de Honra
^c Designated as Pró-Nacional

=== Advancements ===
- Portuguese Cup: 1/4 final (2010–11 season), defeated Varzim 1–2, lost to Vitória de Guimarães 0–2 the following match.

== League and cup history ==
Season	I	II	III	IV	V	Pts.	Pl.	W	L	T	GS	GA	Diff.
1994–95				18		44 pts	17	10	7	48	29	27	21
2006–07			2										
2007–08				12 [1]									
2008–09			2 [7]										

== Current squad ==
As of 1 December 2020

Note: Flags indicate national team as defined under FIFA eligibility rules; some limited exceptions apply. Players may hold more than one non-FIFA nationality.

No.	Pos.	Nation	Player
—	GK	POR	Rui Rêgo
—	GK	POR	Pedro Costa
—	GK	POR	Daniel Marinho
—	DF	POR	Miguel Ângelo
—	DF	POR	Pedro Rodrigues
—	DF	POR	João Paulo Oliveira
—	DF	POR	João Gabriel
—	DF	BRA	Ricardo Bouças
—	DF	POR	Rui Sá
—	DF	POR	Rui Ferreira
—	DF	POR	Filipe Almeida
—	MF	POR	João Freitas
—	MF	NGA	Abdullahi Olatunji
—	MF	POR	Ivan Alves
—	MF	POR	Luís Ferraz
—	FW	BRA	Marcelo
—	FW	POR	Diogo Torres
—	FW	POR	Zé Diogo
—	FW	POR	Bruno Fernandes
—	FW	BRA	Joel Marques
—	FW	POR	Leonardo Costa
—	FW	POR	Flávio Barbosa

== Presidents ==
- (Portugal) Ántónio Ferreira da Sila (late-2000s)
- (Portugal) Paulo Rafael (late-2000s)
