= Hélder Mota =

Portuguese footballer

Personal information
- Full name: Hélder Nuno Almeida Pereira Mota Lopes
- Date of birth: 25 June 1992 (age 34)
- Place of birth: Guimarães, Portugal
- Height: 1.78 m (5 ft 10 in)
- Position: Midfielder

Team information
- Current team: Berço SC
- Number: 17

Youth career
- 2008−2009: ARC Fair Play
- 2009−2011: Penafiel

Senior career*
Years	Team	Apps	(Gls)
2012–2014	Penafiel	5	(0)
2012–2013	→ Rebordosa (loan)	14	(2)
2014–2015	Sobrado	30	(8)
2015–2016	Pedras Salgadas	32	(6)
2016–2017	Felgueiras	14	(1)
2017	São Martinho	10	(1)
2017–2018	Pedras Salgadas	25	(1)
2018–	Berço SC	36	(10)
- * Club domestic league appearances and goals as of 15:57, 20 October 2019 (UTC)

Hélder Nuno Almeida Pereira Mota Lopes (born 25 June 1992), known as Mota, is a Portuguese footballer who plays for Berço SC in the Campeonato Nacional de Seniores, as a midfielder.
