= Diogo Clemente =

Portuguese footballer

Personal information
- Full name: Diogo Mineiro Clemente
- Date of birth: 29 September 1995 (age 31)
- Place of birth: Óbidos, Portugal
- Height: 1.68 m (5 ft 6 in)
- Position: Right back

Team information
- Current team: Caldas
- Number: 8

Youth career
- 2003–2004: União Olho Marinho
- 2004–2013: Caldas
- 2003–2014: Torreense

Senior career*
| Years | Team | Apps | (Gls) |
| 2013–2014 | Torreense | 3 | (1) |
| 2014–2018 | Caldas | 81 | (4) |
| 2018–2020 | Oliveirense | 40 | (0) |
| 2020–2021 | Arouca | 3 | (0) |
| 2021 | → Estrela da Amadora (loan) | 15 | (0) |
| 2021– | Caldas | 124 | (2) |
- * Club domestic league appearances and goals as of 7 May 2026

Diogo Mineiro Clemente (born 29 September 1995) is a Portuguese professional footballer who plays for Caldas as a defender.

== Football career ==
On 28 July 2018, Clemente made his professional debut with Oliveirense in a 2018–19 Taça da Liga match against Belenenses.
