= João Mário (footballer, born 1966) =

Portuguese footballer

Personal information
- Full name: João Mário Ferreira Oliveira
- Date of birth: 28 December 1966 (age 59)
- Place of birth: Porto, Portugal
- Height: 1.78 m (5 ft 10 in)
- Position: Midfielder

Team information
- Current team: Olympiacos (assistant)

Youth career
- 1981–1985: Porto

Senior career*
Years	Team	Apps	(Gls)
1985–1987	Paços de Ferreira		
1987–1992	Braga	126	(1)
1992–1993	Tirsense	33	(1)
1993–1994	Famalicão	29	(1)
1994–1996	Tirsense	11	(0)
1996–1997	Beira-Mar	24	(0)
1997–1998	Moreirense	14	(0)
1998–1999	Gondomar		
1999–2000	Paredes		

Managerial career
- 2000–2002: Paredes (assistant)
- 2002: Paredes
- 2002–2003: Freamunde
- 2004–2005: Moreirense (youth)
- 2005–2007: Varzim (assistant)
- 2007–2008: Vitória Setúbal (assistant)
- 2008: Asteras Tripolis
- 2009: Marítimo (scout)
- 2009–2010: Sporting CP (assistant)
- 2011–2012: Beşiktaş (scout)
- 2012: İstanbul Başakşehir (assistant)
- 2013–2015: Shabab Al Ahli (youth)
- 2015–2017: Sheffield Wednesday (assistant)
- 2017–2018: Swansea City (assistant)
- 2019–2020: Rio Ave (assistant)
- 2020–2022: Braga (assistant)
- 2022: Al Wahda (assistant)
- 2022–2023: Celta (assistant)
- 2023–: Olympiacos (assistant)
- * Club domestic league appearances and goals

João Mário Ferreira Oliveira (born 28 December 1966), known as João Mário (Portuguese pronunciation: [ʒuˈɐ̃w ˈmaɾju, ˈʒwɐ̃w -]), is a Portuguese former professional footballer who played as a midfielder and is currently an assistant manager to Carlos Carvalhal at Super League Greece club Olympiacos.

== Career ==
João Mário made his Primeira Liga debut for Braga on 29 August 1987 as a starter in a 0–0 draw against Salgueiros.

He made 199 appearances during nine seasons in the Primeira Liga for Braga, Tirsense and Famalicão.

After the end of his playing career, João Mário remained active in the football world, being part of Carlos Carvalhal's coaching staff at Vitória de Setúbal, Asteras Tripolis, Marítimo, Sporting CP, Beşiktaş, İstanbul Başakşehir F.K., Sheffield Wednesday, Swansea City, Rio Ave, Braga, Al Wahda, Celta de Vigo and Olympiacos.

== Personal ==
His son João Cunha is a professional footballer.
