= Guadalupe (Santa Cruz da Graciosa) =

- Civil parish
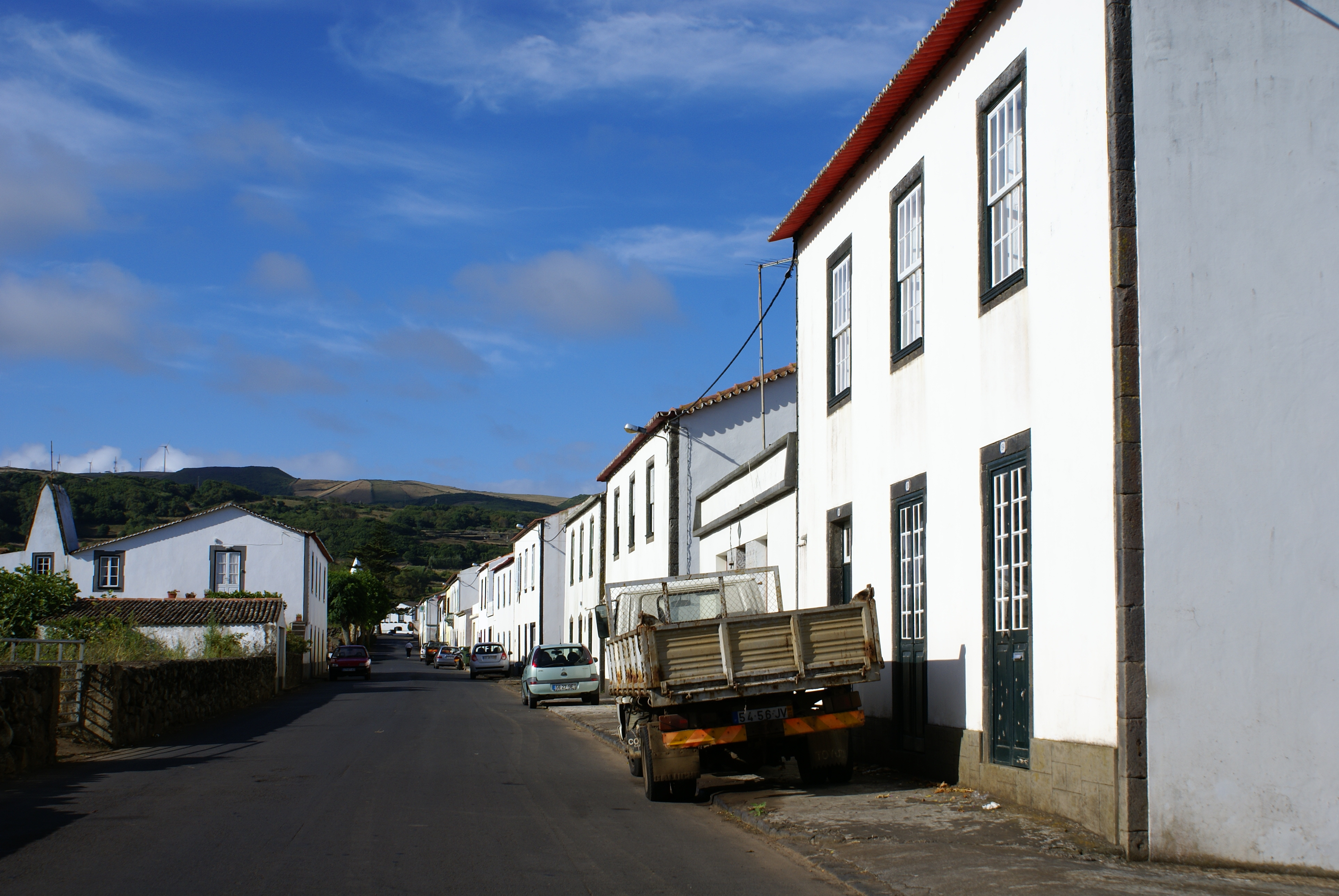
- Partial vista of the Ribeirinha, in Guadalupe, showing the windmill farm on the Serra Branca

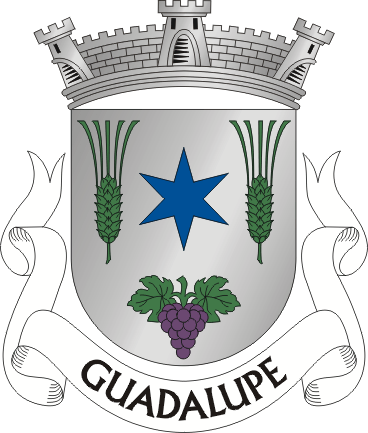
- Coat of arms

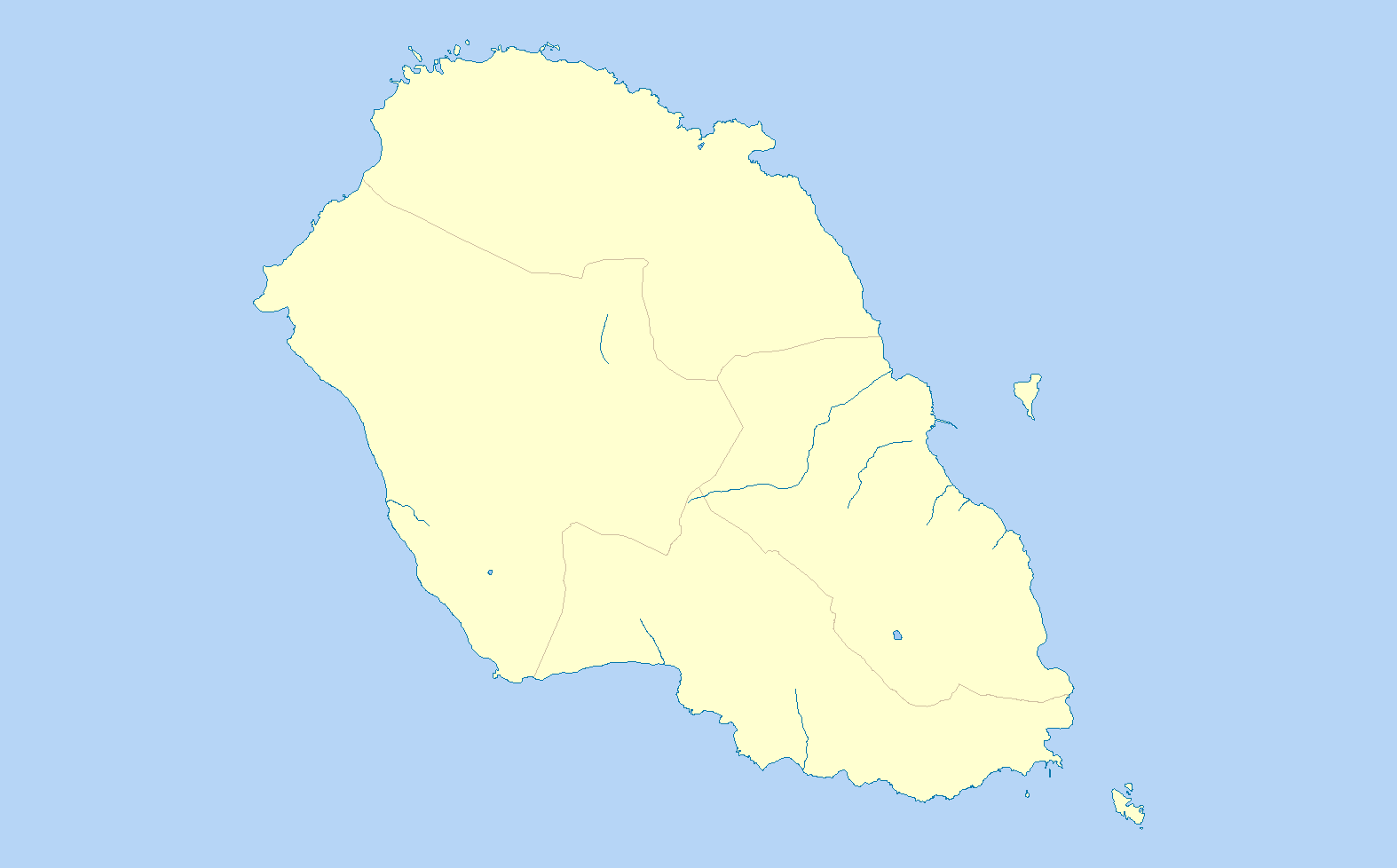
- Location in the Azores Guadalupe (Graciosa)
- Coordinates: 39°3′9″N 28°1′42″W
- Country: Portugal
- Auton. region: Azores
- Island: Graciosa
- Municipality: Santa Cruz da Graciosa
- Established: Parish: c.1644 Civil parish: 28 November 1684

Area
  - Total: 20.62 km^{2} (7.96 sq mi)
- Elevation: 166 m (545 ft)

Population (2011)
  - Total: 1,096
  - Density: 53.15/km^{2} (137.7/sq mi)
- Time zone: UTC−01:00 (AZOT)
  - Summer (DST): UTC+00:00 (AZOST)
- Postal code: 9880-021
- Area code: 292
- Patron: Nossa Senhora de Guadalupe

Guadalupe is a civil parish in the municipality of Santa Cruz da Graciosa, on the island of Graciosa in the Portuguese archipelago of the Azores. The population in 2011 was 1,096, occupying an area of 20.62 square kilometres (7.96 mi^{2}).

== History ==
Population of Guadalupe (1844 - 2011)
Year	Pop.	±%
1844	3,032	—
1864	2,690	−11.3%
1878	2,616	−2.8%
1890	2,676	+2.3%
1900	2,718	+1.6%
1911	2,485	−8.6%
1920	2,479	−0.2%
1930	2,732	+10.2%
1940	3,087	+13.0%
1950	3,223	+4.4%
1960	3,013	−6.5%
1970	2,562	−15.0%
1981	1,736	−32.2%
1991	1,554	−10.5%
2001	1,306	−16.0%
2011	1,096	−16.1%

The fertile lands were first settled in the early 16th century, resulting in narrow parcels radiating from north to south.

Guadalupe became the centre of cereal production on the island, with the lands acquired by many of the principal families of Santa Cruz. Consequently, many of the great houses obtained their wealth from the fields and pasturelands in the west.

The parish was created in 1644, following the disaggregation of the western half of the municipality of Santa Cruz da Graciosa, which was then part of the Vila da Praia) and the parish of Santa Cruz da Graciosa.

With a population exceeding 3000 inhabitants by the 19th century, for many years the parish was the most populous centre of the island, surpassing the populations in the principal urban centres: Praia and Santa Cruz.

== Geography ==
The parish of Guadalupe is constituted by several agglomerations, aligned in a dispersed-oriented form along the islands main roadways. It is a multi-polar structure, highlighted by isolated centres that include some residences, churches, schools and impérios, while the majority of homesteads are dispersed along the roadways. The parish is therefore an administrative entity, rather the a social construct; residents are adhere, therefore, more to their locality, rather than the parish.

The principal localities in the parish, include:

- Guadalupe, the parish centre and location of the parochial church, situated in the heart of the Courelas plain, a zone of fertile lands. With connection to the Santa Cruz, some 3 kilometres (1.9 mi) away, it is the point of convergence of the road network to the northwest and centre. The urban area includes the locations of Pontal, Cruz do Barro Branco (which had its own school until 2003), Pé de Ladeira and, partially, Feteira (sites linked along the axis that connected Guadalupe with Luz), locally known as Sul, owing to the valley formed between Serra das Fontes (in the north) and Serra Dormida (south);
- Vitória, a settlement that occupied the extreme northwest of the island, between the volcanic spatter cones of Pico das Bichas, Pico da Brasileira and Pico das Terças. Its hermitage, situated in Beira-Mar da Vitória, was dedicated to Our Lady of Victories, was constructed in 1623 in commemoration of the victory Graciosenses over the Barbary coast pirates on 19 May 1623, in Afonso do Porto (today Porto Afonso). The place had (until the late 20th century) two primary schools, constructed by former residents who had made their fortunes in Brazil, at the end of the 19th century. In addition to the Hermitage of Nossa Senhora da Vitória, the curate of Vitória, instituted in 1886, includes the Church of Santo António, constructed between 1904 and 1907, through contributions from the emigrante community in Brazil and North America, while two impérios were constructed, in Beira-Mar da Vitória (1918) and in Santo António da Vitória (1914). The area of Terra do Conde is celebrated for its wine production and vineyards.
- Ribeirinha, is a locality situated north of Serra Branca, between the localities of Brasileira and Almas, is constituted by five agglomerations, that correspond to the axis that converge (from the localities of Alto da Ribeirinha, Caldeiras, Pedreiras, Esperança Velha and Grotas). These roadways converge at the settlements centre, dominated by the Church of Nossa Senhora da Esperança, square and bandshelter (inaugurated on 30 July 1967), império and old primary school (closed in 2003). The Church of Nossa Senhora da Esperança was constructed in 1847 and expanded in 1898. The hall was constructed by the Brotherhood of the Holy Spirit, equipped with traditional kitchen, used by gatherings of seniors, functioning as community civic centre at times. In the area of Esperança Velha a cross identifies the place of the primitive 17th century church, long since destroyed.
- Brasileira, a small place situated in a valley fronting the sea, between Pico da Brasileira, Pico das Terças and Pico das Caldeiras, constituted by an urban area and locality of Jorge Gomes. Without its own hermitage or school, the zone is an extension of Ribeirinha. It was in this locality that, on 13 July 1929, an Amiot 123 titled Marszałek Piłsudski piloted by Ludwik Idzikowski crashed, killing the aviator. The plane became lost during the pilot's attempt at crossing the Atlantic, departing from France and destined for New York, the plane tried to land, lost control and crashed: the local is marked by a cross.
- Almas, is a locality along the axis linking Guadalupe to the Serra Dormida, marked by a school (closed in 1993), Hermitage of São Miguel Arcanjo (dedicated in the 18th century) and império (from 1963). The locality includes the place of Tanque and Manuel Gaspar. Tanque is marked by an interesting reservoir, associated with three springs, dating from the 17th century, encircled by a complex of washhouse.

This fertility and open space made settlement and population growth rapid, especially between the end of 15th century and 1550. With increased poverty, the population began to decrease, resulting in an exodus to the United States by the second half of the 20th century.

== Architecture ==
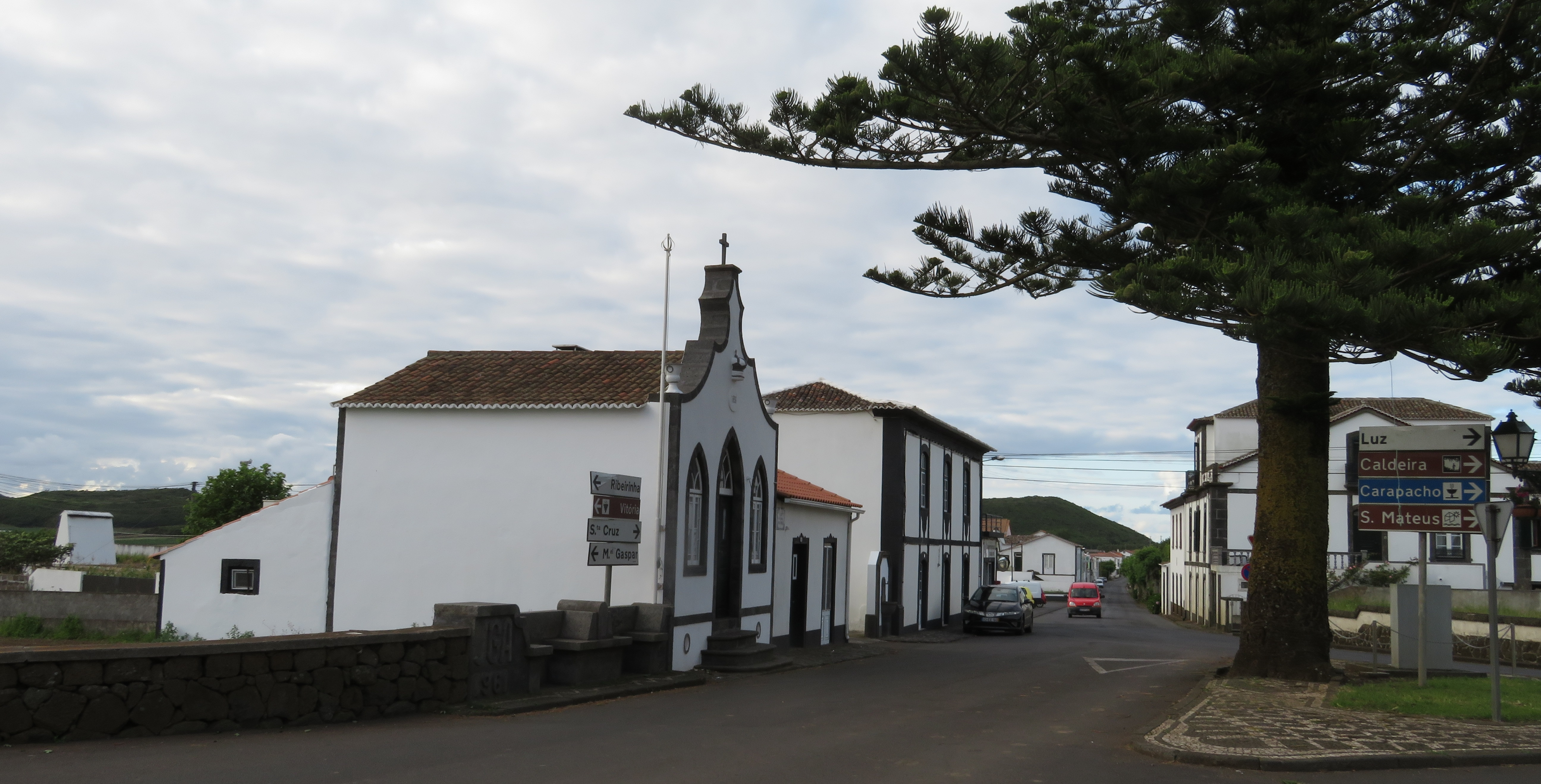
Main street of Guadalupe and Império of the Holy Spirit of Guadalupe

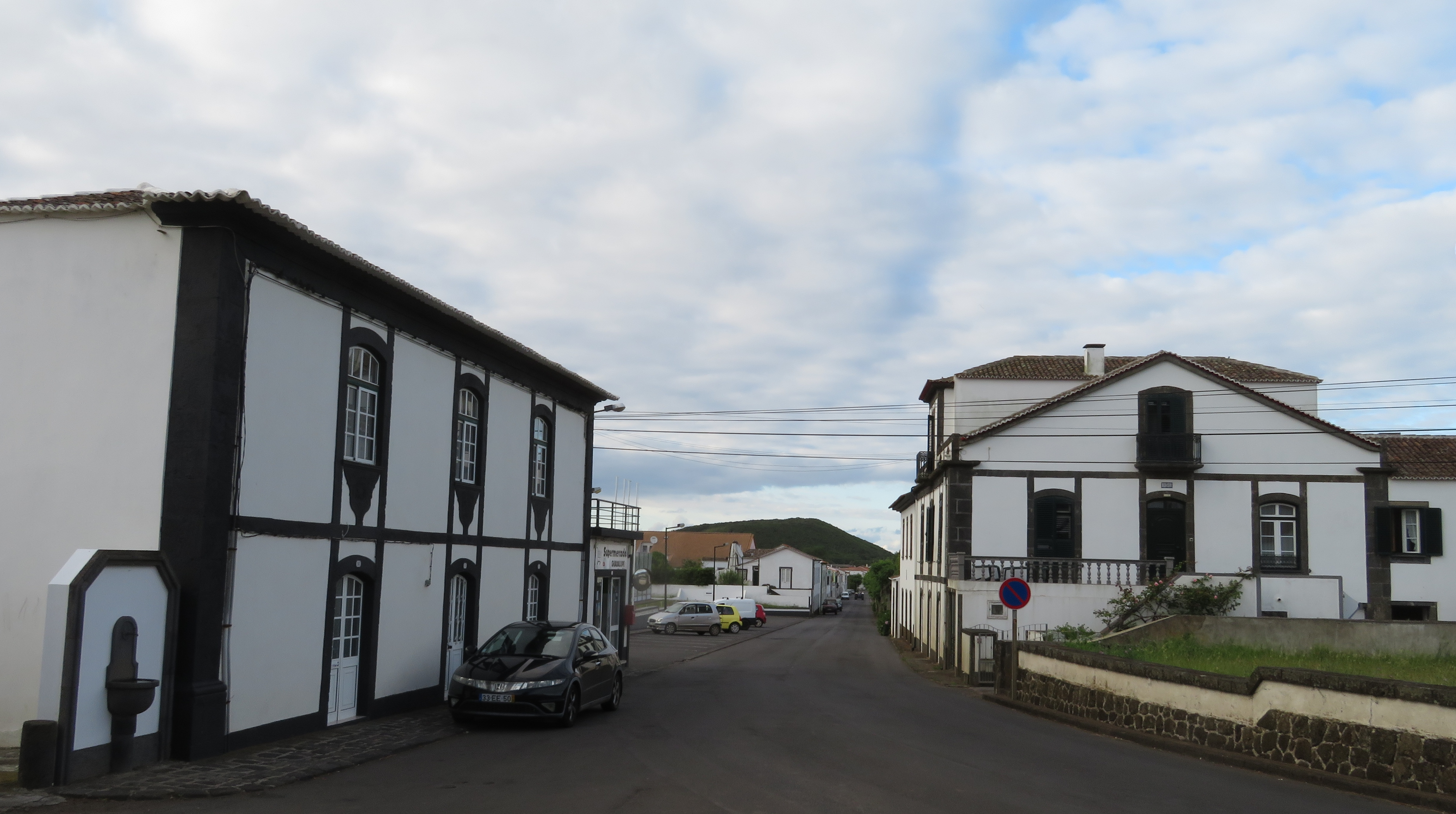
Houses built in the 18th and 19th century along the road

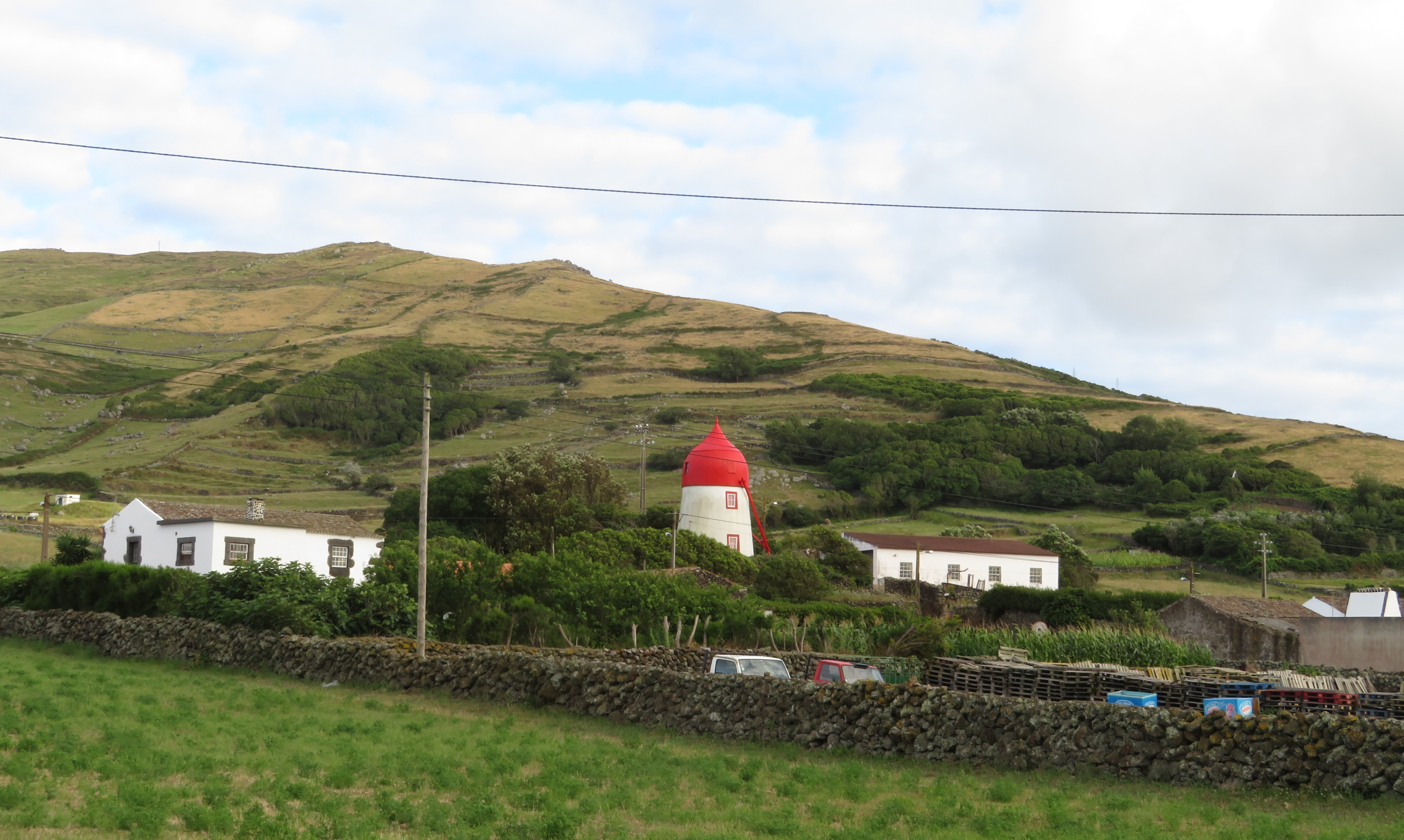
Windmill of Canada do Quarteiro as seen from the regional roadway

=== Civic ===
- Kindergraten of Guadalupe (Portuguese: Jardim de Infância de Guadalupe)
- Primary School Caminho da Igreja (Portuguese: Escola Primário do Caminho da Igreja)
- Windmill of Canada do Quarteiro (Portuguese: Moinho de vento da Canada do Quarteiro)

=== Religious ===
- Church of Nossa Senhora de Guadalupe (Portuguese: Igreja Paroquial de Guadalupe/Igreja de Nossa Senhora de Guadalupe)
- Church of Santo António da Vitória (Portuguese: Igreja de Santo António da Vitória)
- Hermitage of Nossa Senhora da Vitória (Portuguese: Ermida de Nossa Senhora da Vitória)
- Hermitage of São Miguel Arcanjo (Portuguese: Ermida de São Miguel Arcanjo)
- Império of the Holy Spirit of Beira-Mar da Vitória (Portuguese: Império do Espírito Santo da Beira-Mar da Vitória)
- Império of the Holy Spirit of Guadalupe (Portuguese: Império do Espírito Santo de Guadalupe)
- Império of the Holy Spirit of Santo António da Vitória (Portuguese: Império do Espírito Santo de Santo António da Vitória)
