= Leo Tomé =

Brazilian footballer

Personal information
- Full name: Leonardo di Mello Martins Tomé
- Date of birth: 17 September 1986 (age 40)
- Height: 1.70 m (5 ft 7 in)
- Position: Midfielder

Team information
- Current team: Farense
- Number: 25

Youth career
- 2003–2005: Farense

Senior career*
| Years | Team | Apps | (Gls) |
| 2003–2004 | Farense | | |
| 2005–2007 | Ferreiras | | |
| 2007–2008 | Almancilense | | |
| 2008–2009 | Juventude Campinense | | |
| 2009–2012 | Louletano | | |
| 2012–2016 | Mafra | 133 | (14) |
| 2016– | Farense | 23 | (1) |
- * Club domestic league appearances and goals as of 6 December 2017

Leonardo di Mello Martins Tomé, known as Leo Tomé (born 17 September 1986) is a Brazilian football player who plays for Farense. He also holds Portuguese citizenship.

== Club career ==
He made his professional debut in the Segunda Liga for Mafra on 8 August 2015 in a game against Gil Vicente.
