= Jonathan Oliveira =

Portuguese footballer

Personal information
- Full name: Jonathan da Silva Oliveira
- Date of birth: 10 July 1991 (age 35)
- Place of birth: Romariz, Portugal
- Height: 1.80 m (5 ft 11 in)
- Position: Striker

Team information
- Current team: Ovarense

Youth career
- 2002–2010: Feirense

Senior career*
Years	Team	Apps	(Gls)
2010–2014	Feirense	5	(0)
2010–2011	→ Lusitânia Lourosa (loan)	28	(11)
2012–2013	→ Trofense (loan)	23	(1)
2013	→ Lusitânia Lourosa (loan)	5	(0)
2014	→ Espinho (loan)	15	(9)
2014–2015	Espinho	17	(7)
2015	Sanjoanense	10	(4)
2015–2016	Gondomar	25	(4)
2016–2017	Estarreja	27	(10)
2017–2018	Anadia	26	(3)
2018	Ideal	3	(0)
2018–2019	Cinfães	19	(1)
2019	Fiães	12	(2)
2020	Bustelo	6	(1)
2020	Cucujães	4	(0)
2021–	Ovarense	0	(0)
- * Club domestic league appearances and goals ‡ National team caps and goals as of 1 August 2021

Jonathan da Silva Oliveira (born 10 July 1991) is a Portuguese footballer who played as a forward.
