= Tiago Martins (referee) =

Portuguese football referee

- Full name: Tiago Bruno Lopes Martins
- Born: 29 May 1980 (age 46); Portugal

Domestic
Years	League	Role
2013–	LigaPro	Referee
2014–	Primeira Liga	Referee

International
Years	League	Role
2015–	FIFA listed	Referee

Tiago Bruno Lopes Martins (born 29 May 1980) is a Portuguese football referee.

== Refereeing career ==
Martins began officiating in the LigaPro in 2013, refereeing his first match on 25 August 2013 between Sporting CP B and Trofense. The following season, he was appointed to referee in the Primeira Liga, and officiated his first match on 31 August 2014 between Nacional and Arouca.

In 2015, Martins became FIFA listed, and on 28 March 2015 he officiated his first youth international, the 2015 UEFA European Under-19 Championship qualification match between Russia and Lithuania. Martins officiated his first international club match on 2 July 2015 between Latvian club Jelgava and Bulgarian club Litex Lovech in the 2015–16 UEFA Europa League first qualifying round.

On 19 July 2017, Martins officiated his first UEFA Champions League match between Polish club Legia Warsaw and Finnish club IFK Mariehamn in the 2017–18 second qualifying round. On 6 October 2017, he officiated his first senior international, a World Cup qualification match between Italy and Macedonia. Martins officiated his first tournament proper match in the 2017–18 UEFA Europa League group stage on 7 December 2017 between German club Hertha BSC and Swedish club Östersund.

On 30 April 2018, Martins was selected by FIFA as one of the video assistant referees for the 2018 FIFA World Cup in Russia, the first FIFA World Cup to use the technology. Martins was appointed to officiate the 2018 Taça de Portugal Final on 20 May 2018 between Aves and Sporting CP.

Martins was appointed as the assistant VAR in his first World Cup match between France and Australia in Group C.
