= João Cunha (footballer) =

Portuguese footballer

Personal information
- Full name: João Tiago Oliveira da Cunha
- Date of birth: 4 February 1996 (age 30)
- Place of birth: Valongo, Portugal
- Height: 1.83 m (6 ft 0 in)
- Position: Centre-back

Team information
- Current team: Paredes

Youth career
- 2005–2011: Porto
- 2011–2012: Padroense
- 2012–2013: Porto
- 2013–2015: Rio Ave

Senior career*
Years	Team	Apps	(Gls)
2015–2016	Rio Ave	0	(0)
2015–2016	→ Vizela (loan)	28	(0)
2016–2018	Vizela	31	(1)
2018–2019	Covilhã	9	(0)
2019–2020	União de Leiria	18	(2)
2020	→ Mafra (loan)	0	(0)
2020–2021	Mafra	19	(0)
2021–2023	Felgueiras	43	(1)
2023–2024	Anadia	17	(0)
2024–	Paredes	6	(1)
- * Club domestic league appearances and goals as of 10 November 2024

João Tiago Oliveira da Cunha (born 4 February 1996) is a Portuguese footballer who plays as a centre-back for Paredes.

== Career ==
On 21 January 2015, Cunha made his professional debut with Rio Ave in a 2014–15 Taça da Liga match against Académica.

== Personal life ==
His father João Mário played 9 seasons in the Primeira Liga.
