= Jaime Simões =

Portuguese footballer

Jaime
Personal information
- Full name: Jaime Daniel Melão Simões
- Date of birth: 11 June 1989 (age 37)
- Place of birth: Santarém, Portugal
- Height: 1.88 m (6 ft 2 in)
- Position: Centre-back

Team information
- Current team: União Santarém
- Number: 14

Youth career
- 1997–2006: Académica Santarém
- 2006–2008: Beira-Mar

Senior career*
Years	Team	Apps	(Gls)
2008–2014	Beira-Mar	96	(4)
2008–2010	→ Avanca (loan)	24	(1)
2014–2015	CFR Cluj	0	(0)
2015–2017	União Madeira	39	(1)
2015–2016	→ Apollon Limassol (loan)	10	(0)
2017–2018	Leixões	28	(1)
2018–2023	Covilhã	106	(6)
2023–2024	Swift Hesperange	18	(1)
2024–	União Santarém	38	(1)
- * Club domestic league appearances and goals as of 23:50, 16 August 2026 (UTC)

Jaime Daniel Melão Simões (born 11 June 1989 in Santarém), known simply as Jaime, is a Portuguese professional footballer who plays as a central defender for União de Santarém.
