= Leo Araújo =

Brazilian footballer

Personal information
- Full name: Leonardo dos Santos Araújo
- Date of birth: 28 June 1992 (age 34)
- Height: 1.85 m (6 ft 1 in)
- Position: Centre-back

Team information
- Current team: Espinho
- Number: 56

Youth career
- 2011: Botafogo

Senior career*
Years	Team	Apps	(Gls)
2012	Náutico	3	(0)
2013	Cianorte	1	(0)
2014	Parnahyba	5	(1)
2015	Espírito Santo		
2015–2017	1º Dezembro	47	(2)
2017	Sintrense	14	(2)
2017–2018	SC Coimbrões	29	(3)
2018	Sanjoanense	6	(1)
2018–2019	Oliveira do Hospital	23	(3)
2019–2020	Benfica e Castelo Branco	25	(2)
2020–2023	Canelas	60	(0)
2023–2024	SC Coimbrões	27	(5)
2024–	Espinho	9	(2)
- * Club domestic league appearances and goals as of 21:56, 16 November 2024 (UTC)

Leonardo dos Santos Araújo (born 28 June 1992), known as Leo Araújo, is a Brazilian footballer who plays as a centre-back for S.C. Espinho.

== Career ==
Leo Araújo made his professional debut in the Campeonato Pernambucano for Náutico on 7 March 2012 in a game against Porto de Caruaru.
