= André Santos (footballer, born 1988) =

Portuguese footballer

Personal information
- Full name: André Antunes Santos
- Date of birth: 20 July 1988 (age 38)
- Place of birth: Torres Vedras, Portugal
- Height: 1.80 m (5 ft 11 in)
- Positions: Midfielder; right back

Team information
- Current team: Caldas

Youth career
- 1996–1999: Torreense
- 1999–2005: Benfica
- 2005–2007: Porto

Senior career*
Years	Team	Apps	(Gls)
2007–2009	Torreense	54	(2)
2009	Aljustrelense	6	(1)
2010	Monsanto	17	(0)
2010–2011	Sertanense	25	(0)
2011–2012	Torreense	27	(0)
2012–2013	Feirense	38	(0)
2014	Lourinhanense	12	(0)
2014–	Caldas	141	(15)

International career
2005	Portugal U17	2	(0)
2005–2006	Portugal U18	7	(0)
2006–2007	Portugal U19	7	(0)
- * Club domestic league appearances and goals as of 8 March 2020

André Antunes Santos (born 20 July 1988) is a Portuguese professional footballer who plays for Caldas S.C. as a midfielder or a right back.

== Club career ==
Born in Torres Vedras, Lisbon District, Santos spent the vast majority of his senior career in the third division after starting out at local club S.C.U. Torreense. In 2012, he signed with C.D. Feirense from the Segunda Liga.

Santos made his professional debut on 11 August 2012, playing 55 minutes in the 1–3 league loss away against C.F. Os Belenenses. During his one-and-a-half-year tenure at the Estádio Marcolino de Castro, he appeared in 46 competitive matches.

In the summer of 2014, Santos returned to the third level after joining Caldas SC.
