= Ricardo Bouças =

Portuguese footballer

Personal information
- Full name: Ricardo Gomes Lezón Bouças
- Date of birth: 16 December 1994 (age 31)
- Place of birth: Viana do Castelo, Portugal
- Height: 1.84 m (6 ft 1/2 in)
- Position: Centre back

Team information
- Current team: Merelinense
- Number: 15

Youth career
- 2002–2007: Luciano Sousa
- 2007–2009: Vianense
- 2009–2013: Sporting Braga

Senior career*
Years	Team	Apps	(Gls)
2013–2014	Valenciano	27	(2)
2013–2014	Melgacense (loan)	2	(0)
2014–2015	Vianense	22	(1)
2014	Vianense B	1	(0)
2015–2016	Sporting Covilhã B	18	(2)
2016–2017	Sporting Covilhã	0	(0)
2017	GD Águias Moradal	11	(0)
2018	Salgueiros	8	(0)
2019	AD Oliveirense	17	(3)
2019–	Merelinense	21	(0)
- * Club domestic league appearances and goals as of 19:48, 25 January 2021 (UTC)

Ricardo Gomes Lezón Bouças (born 16 December 1994) is a Portuguese footballer who plays for Merelinense, as a defender.

== Club career ==
On 3 January 2017, Bouças made his professional debut with Sporting Covilhã in a 2016–17 Taça da Liga match against Sporting Braga.
