= Merelim (São Pedro) e Frossos =

- Civil parish
- Location in Portugal
- Coordinates: 41.578°N 8.452°W
- Country: Portugal
- Region: Norte
- Intermunic. comm.: Cávado
- District: Braga
- Municipality: Braga

Area
  - Total: 3.15 km^{2} (1.22 sq mi)

Population (2011)
  - Total: 3,726
  - Density: 1,180/km^{2} (3,060/sq mi)
- Time zone: UTC+00:00 (WET)
  - Summer (DST): UTC+01:00 (WEST)

Merelim (São Pedro) e Frossos is a civil parish in the municipality of Braga, Portugal. It was formed in 2013 by the merger of the former parishes Merelim (São Pedro) and Frossos. The population in 2011 was 3,726, in an area of 3.15 km^{2} (1.22 sq mi).

== Persons ==
- Pedro de Merelim (1913-2002), pseudonym of the historian and ethnographer Joaquim Gomes da Cunha

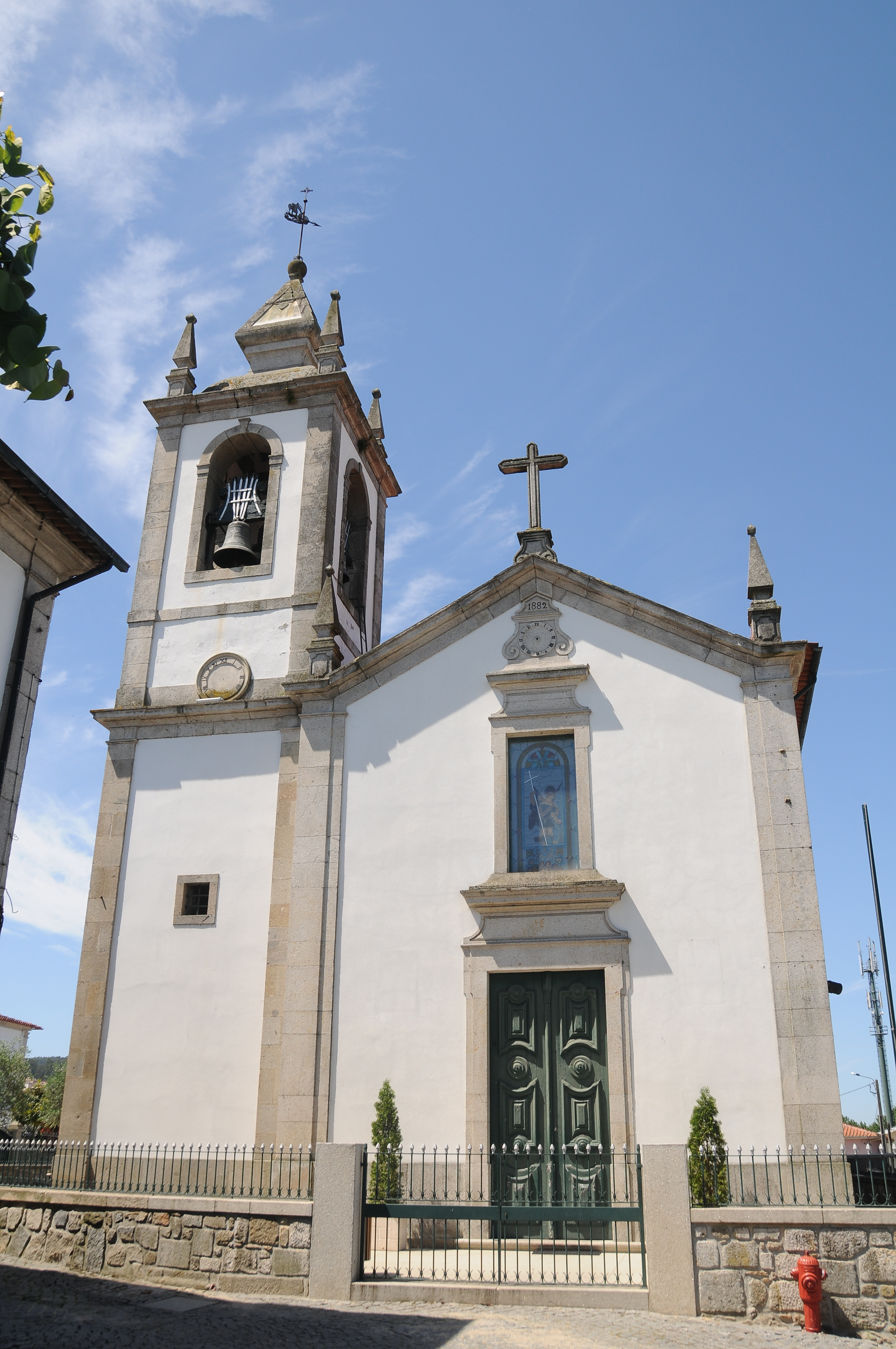
Frossos Church
