= Martin Simões =

Portuguese footballer (born 1996)

Luther King
Personal information
- Full name: Martin Luther King Junior Morais Simões
- Date of birth: 21 July 1996 (age 30)
- Place of birth: Viana do Castelo, Portugal
- Height: 1.88 m (6 ft 2 in)
- Position: Forward

Youth career
- 2006–2010: Benfica
- 2010–2011: Oeiras
- 2011–2012: Lourel
- 2012–2013: Real
- 2014: Sampdoria
- 2015: Olhanense

Senior career*
Years	Team	Apps	(Gls)
2015	Olhanense	4	(0)
2015	Tourizense	7	(0)
2016	1º Dezembro	3	(0)
2016–2017	Barreirense	31	(10)
2017	São Martinho	15	(4)
2018	AD Ceuta FC		
2018	Sacavanense	12	(2)
2019	Sertanense	12	(0)
- * Club domestic league appearances and goals as of 29 April 2019

Martin Luther King Junior Morais Simões, known as Luther King (born 21 July 1996) is a Portuguese footballer who plays as a forward.

== Career ==
Born in Viana do Castelo, Luther King was named after the famous African American activist, a hero of his father. He began his career in the youth ranks of S.L. Benfica, and also had a spell in Italy with U.C. Sampdoria in 2014 before joining S.C. Olhanense in February 2015 on a deal for the rest of the season. His transfer was one of several at the time between the two clubs. On 18 February, he made his professional debut in a 1–0 Segunda Liga loss at C.S. Marítimo B, replacing Adílson for the last 12 minutes.

Subsequently, Luther King played in the third tier of Portuguese football with G.D. Tourizense, S.U. 1º de Dezembro, F.C. Barreirense and A.R. São Martinho. In January 2018, he joined Spanish Tercera División club AD Ceuta FC, and received media attention for his name. He returned to his country's third level in June, with S.G. Sacavanense and six months later Sertanense FC.
