= Caldas S.C. =

Portuguese association football club

Caldas
- Full name: Caldas Sport Clube
- Nickname: Pelicanos
- Founded: 15 May 1916; 110 years ago
- Ground: Campo da Mata; Caldas da Rainha; Portugal
- Capacity: 5,700
- Chairman: Jorge Manuel Fortunato dos Reis
- Manager: João Aguiar
- League: Liga 3
- 2023–24: Relegation groups, Serie 2, 2nd
- Website: http://www.caldassportclube.pt
Home colours	Away colours

Caldas Sport Clube is a Portuguese professional football team based in Caldas da Rainha. Founded on 15 May 1916, the club competes in the Liga 3.

The team plays its home games at Campo da Mata with a capacity for 5,700 spectators.

== History ==
Between 1956 and 1959, Caldas participated in the Portuguese Liga, the top level of Portuguese football, but they currently play their matches in the Liga 3. In 2018, Caldas reached the semi-finals of Taça de Portugal, along with Desportivo das Aves, Sporting CP and FC Porto.Later in the 2023 season they beat Benfica.

== Current squad ==
As of 21 September 2026

Note: Flags indicate national team as defined under FIFA eligibility rules; some limited exceptions apply. Players may hold more than one non-FIFA nationality.

No.	Pos.	Nation	Player
1	GK	POR	Wilson Soares
3	DF	POR	Nando
4	MF	POR	Pipo
5	MF	POR	Rodrigo Correia
6	DF	POR	Diogo Izata
7	MF	POR	Ricky
8	MF	POR	Diogo Clemente
9	FW	POR	Gonçalo Chaves
11	MF	POR	Dani Fernandes
12	GK	POR	Duarte Almeida
16	MF	POR	Miguel Costa
17	FW	POR	Gonças
20	DF	POR	Guilherme Lopes
21	FW	MOZ	Edson Mucuana

No.	Pos.	Nation	Player
22	MF	POR	Tiago Serrazina
23	DF	POR	Miguel Rodeia
24	MF	POR	Filipe Oliveira
25	GK	POR	Luís Farinha
27	DF	POR	Mateus Magalhães
35	FW	POR	João Tarzan
56	DF	BRA	Caio Amaral (on loan from Torreense)
77	FW	POR	Guilherme Pio
80	MF	POR	Matheus Palmério
90	FW	POR	Renato Alexandre
94	FW	POR	João Vieira
—	DF	POR	Isaac Monteiro
—	DF	POR	Diogo Nascimento
—	MF	MOZ	Pepo
