= 2014–15 Taça de Portugal =

Tournament details
- Country: Portugal
- Dates: 6 September 2014 – 31 May 2015
- Teams: 135

Final positions
- Champions: Sporting CP (16th title)
- Runners-up: Braga

Tournament statistics
- Matches played: 103
- Goals scored: 343 (3.33 per match)
- Top goal scorer: Jonas (6 goals)

The 2014–15 Taça de Portugal was the 75th season of the Taça de Portugal, the premier Portuguese football knockout cup competition organised by the Portuguese Football Federation.

The competition was contested by a total of 135 clubs, comprising teams from the top three tiers of Portuguese football (Note: Reserve teams from Primeira Liga clubs (B teams) were ineligible to participate.) and the winners of the District Cups. It began with the first-round matches on 6 September 2014 and concluded on 31 May 2015 with the final at the Estádio Nacional in Oeiras, where Sporting CP defeated Braga 3–1 on penalties, after a 2–2 draw at the end of extra-time. This was the first time that the competition's final was decided by a penalty shootout. With this victory, Sporting CP secured their 16th title in the competition and ended a seven-year run without winning official competitions, following their win at the 2008 Supertaça Cândido de Oliveira.

The title holders were Benfica, who beat Rio Ave 1–0 in the 2014 final to win the competition for a record 25th time. They were not able to defend their title after being defeated 1–2 by eventual finalists Braga in the fifth round.

As the winners, Sporting CP earned the right to play in the 2015–16 UEFA Europa League group stage. However, since they qualified for the 2015–16 UEFA Champions League play-off round through their league placing, their cup winners place in the 2015–16 UEFA Europa League group stage was transferred directly to the highest-placed team in the league qualified for the UEFA Europa League (Braga) – instead of being given to the cup runners-up, as in previous seasons –, with the highest-placed team in the league that did not qualify to European competitions (Belenenses) receiving a place in the third qualifying round.

== Format ==
As in the previous season, the competition format was organised in a knockout system consisting of seven rounds before the final match. A total of 99 teams – 79 competing in the third-tier Campeonato Nacional de Seniores (excluding Marítimo C) and the 20 District Cup winners – enter the tournament in the first round, with 49 of them receiving a bye to the next round. In the second round, these teams are joined by the 18 teams competing in the second-tier Segunda Liga (excluding B teams) and the 25 winners of the first round. In the third round, the 18 top-tier Primeira Liga teams enter the competition for the first time, playing against the 46 winners of the second round. Unlike the previous rounds, which are contested as one-legged fixtures, the semi-finals are played over two legs in a home-and-away basis. The final is played at a neutral venue, traditionally the Estádio Nacional in Oeiras.

Round	Teams remaining	Teams involved	Winners from the previous round	New entries in this round	Leagues entering in this round
First round	135	99	none	99	Campeonato Nacional de Seniores; District Football Associations (District Cup winners)
Second round	110	92	74	18	Segunda Liga
Third round	64	64	46	18	Primeira Liga
Fourth round	32	32	32	none	none
Fifth round	16	16	16	none	none
Quarter-finals	8	8	8	none	none
Semi-finals	4	4	4	none	none
Final	2	2	2	none	none

== Teams ==
A total of 135 teams competing in the top three tiers of the Portuguese football plus the District FA Cups were considered eligible by FPF to participate in the competition:

2014–15 Taça de Portugal teams
Primeira Liga (18 teams)

- Académica de Coimbra
- Arouca
- Belenenses
- Benfica
- Boavista
- Estoril
- Gil Vicente
- Moreirense
- Marítimo
- Nacional
- Paços de Ferreira
- Penafiel
- Porto
- Rio Ave
- Sporting CP
- Braga
- Vitória de Guimarães
- Vitória de Setúbal

Segunda Liga (18 teams)

- Académico de Viseu
- Atlético
- Beira-Mar
- Chaves
- Desportivo das Aves
- Farense
- Feirense
- Freamunde
- Leixões
- Olhanense
- U.D. Oliveirense
- Oriental
- Portimonense
- Santa Clara
- Sporting da Covilhã
- Tondela
- Trofense
- União da Madeira

Campeonato Nacional de Seniores (79 teams)

Series A (10 teams)

- Bragança
- Cerveira
- Fafe
- Limianos
- Mirandela
- Pedras Salgadas
- Santa Maria
- Vianense
- Vieira
- Vilaverdense

Series B (10 teams)

- Amarante
- Famalicão
- Felgueiras 1932
- A.D. Oliveirense
- Ribeirão
- CCD Santa Eulália
- Tirsense
- Varzim
- Vila Real
- Vizela

Series C (10 teams)

- Cinfães
- Coimbrões
- Sporting de Espinho
- Gondomar
- Lusitânia Lourosa
- Moimenta da Beira
- Pedras Rubras
- Sobrado
- Salgueiros 08
- Sousense

Series D (9 teams) (Note: Marítimo C, a reserve team which plays in the Series D, is ineligible to play in the competition.)

- Anadia
- Camacha
- Cesarense
- Estarreja
- Gafanha
- Gouveia
- Lusitano Vildemoinhos
- Sanjoanense
- São João de Ver

Series E (10 teams)

- Benfica Castelo Branco
- Mortágua
- Naval
- Nogueirense
- Oliveira do Hospital
- Pampilhosa
- Sourense
- Sporting de Pombal
- Tourizense
- Vitória de Sernache

Series F (10 teams)

- Alcanenense
- Atlético Ouriense
- Atlético Riachense
- Caldas
- Eléctrico
- Fátima
- Mafra
- Sertanense
- Torreense
- União de Leiria

Series G (10 teams)

- 1º de Dezembro
- Atlético da Malveira
- Casa Pia
- Cova da Piedade
- Fabril Barreiro
- Loures
- Pinhalnovense
- Sacavenense
- Sintrense
- União de Montemor

Series H (10 teams)

- Aljustrelense
- Atlético de Reguengos
- Angrense
- Ferreiras
- Louletano
- Lusitano VRSA
- Moura
- Operário
- Praiense
- Quarteirense

District Football Associations (20 District Cup winners)

- Azores: Boavista Ribeirinha
- Algarve FA: Silves
- Aveiro FA: Águeda
- Beja FA: Piense
- Braga FA: Merelinense
- Bragança FA: Argozelo
- Castelo Branco FA: Alcains
- Coimbra FA: Febres
- Évora FA: Viana Alentejo
- Guarda FA: ACD Soito
- Leiria FA: Marinhense
- Lisboa FA: Real Massamá
- Madeira FA: Câmara de Lobos
- Portalegre FA: Mosteirense
- Porto FA: Serzedo
- Santarém FA: Fazendense
- Setúbal FA: Amora
- Viana do Castelo FA: ADC Correlhã
- Vila Real FA: Montalegre
- Viseu FA: Paivense

== Schedule ==
All draws are held at the FPF headquarters in Lisbon. Match kick-off times are in WET (UTC+0) from the fourth round to the first leg of the semi-finals, and in WEST (UTC+1) during the rest of the competition.

Round	Draw date	Main date(s)	Fixtures	Teams	Prize money
First round	29 July 2014	6–7 September 2014	25	135 → 110	€2,000
Second round	11 September 2014	27–28 September 2014	46	110 → 64	€3,000
Third round	2 October 2014	18–19 October 2014	32	64 → 32	€4,000
Fourth round	27 October 2014	23 November 2014	16	32 → 16	€5,000
Fifth round	27 November 2014	17 December 2014	8	16 → 8	€7,500
Quarter-finals	22 December 2014	7 January 2015	4	8 → 4	€10,000
Semi-finals	22 December 2014	4 March 2015 (1st leg); 8 April 2015 (2nd leg)	4	4 → 2	€15,000
Final	22 December 2014	31 May 2015	1	2 → 1	€300,000 (winner) €150,000 (runner-up)

== First round ==
A total of 99 teams from the Campeonato Nacional de Seniores (CN) and the District Football Associations (D) entered in the first round. The draw took place on Tuesday, 29 July 2014, at 12:00 WEST, and determined the 50 teams playing this round and the 49 teams receiving a bye to the second round. Matches were played on 6 and 7 September 2014.

Number of teams per tier entering this round
Primeira Liga	Segunda Liga	Camp. Nac. Seniores	District FAs	Total
18 / 18	18 / 18	79 / 79	20 / 20	135 / 135

Teams with a bye to the second round
  - AD Oliveirense (CN)
  - Sanjoanense (CN)
  - Amora (D)
  - Anadia (CN)
  - Alcanenense (CN)
  - Marinhense (D)
  - Boavista Ribeirinha (D)
  - Casa Pia (CN)
  - Cinfães (CN)
  - Cova da Piedade (CN)
  - CD Gouveia (CN)
  - Moimenta da Beira (CN)
  - Quarteirense (CN)
  - Argozelo (D)
  - Santa Eulália (CN)
  - Montalegre (D)
  - Câmara de Lobos (D)
  - Serzedo (D)
  - Operário (CN)
  - Eléctrico (CN)
  - Cesarense (CN)
  - Mosteirense (D)
  - Pedras Rubras (CN)
  - Tirsense (CN)
  - Gondomar (CN)
  - Ribeirão (CN)
  - Sourense (CN)
  - Vitória de Sernache (CN)
  - Pedras Salgadas (CN)
  - Louletano (CN)
  - Mortágua (CN)
  - Naval (CN)
  - Real Massamá (D)
  - Águeda (D)
  - Torreense (CN)
  - Silves (D)
  - Benfica Castelo Branco (CN)
  - Angrense (CN)
  - Aljustrelense (CN)
  - Paivense (D)
  - Praiense (CN)
  - Salgueiros 08 (CN)
  - Sacavenense (CN)
  - Sintrense (CN)
  - Coimbrões (CN)
  - Sporting de Pombal (CN)
  - União de Leiria (CN)
  - Vieira (CN)
  - Vilaverdense (CN)

Fixtures

- Amarante (CN) 0–1 Mafra (CN)
- Vizela (CN) 3–1 Cerveira (CN)
- Viana Alentejo (D) 0–2 Vianense (CN)
- Fafe (CN) 1–0 Pinhalnovense (CN)
- Santa Maria (CN) 2–1 Bragança (CN)
- ADC Correlhã (D) 0–2 (a.e.t.) Loures (CN)
- Sporting de Espinho (CN) 0–0 (3–1 p) Camacha (CN)
- Ferreiras (CN) 0–3 Famalicão (CN)
- Vila Real (CN) 2–1 1º de Dezembro (CN)
- Atlético Riachense (CN) 4–3 São João de Ver (CN)
- Lusitânia Lourosa (CN) 3–2 Fátima (CN)
- Atlético Malveira (CN) 4–1 (a.e.t.) Lusitano VRSA (CN)
- ACD Soito (D) 0–1 Atlético Ouriense (CN)
- Limianos (CN) 1–0 Fabril Barreiro (CN)
- Sobrado (CN) 2–2 (1–4 p) Moura (CN)
- Fazendense (D) 2–3 (a.e.t.) Caldas (CN)
- Atlético de Reguengos (CN) 5–3 Tourizense (CN)
- Febres SC (D) 5–3 (a.e.t.) Nogueirense (CN)
- Alcains (D) 2–2 (4–2 p) Piense (D)
- União de Montemor (CN) 4–1 Oliveira do Hospital (CN)
- Lusitano Vildemoinhos (CN) 2–0 Estarreja (CN)
- Varzim (CN) 2–1 (a.e.t.) Mirandela (CN)
- Sousense (CN) 2–0 Gafanha (CN)
- Pampilhosa (CN) 0–2 Sertanense (CN)
- Merelinense (D) 2–3 Felgueiras 1932 (CN)

== Second round ==
A total of 92 teams contested the second round: the 25 winners of the first round, the 49 teams given a bye to this round, and the 18 teams competing in the Segunda Liga (II). The draw took place on Thursday, 11 September, at 12:00 WEST, and matches were played on 27 and 28 September 2014.

Number of teams per tier entering this round
Primeira Liga	Segunda Liga	Camp. Nac. Seniores	District FAs	Total
18 / 18	18 / 18	59 / 79	15 / 20	110 / 135

Fixtures

- Chaves (II) 3–1 Louletano (CN)
- Pedras Salgadas (CN) 2–1 Atlético Ouriense (CN)
- Cinfães (CN) 1–1 (4–5 p) Coimbrões (CN)
- Marinhense (D) 0–6 Torreense (CN)
- Pedras Rubras (CN) 2–1 Anadia (CN)
- Cesarense (CN) 1–3 Sporting da Covilhã (II)
- Beira-Mar (II) 4–2 Sintrense (CN)
- Vianense (CN) 1–1 (1–3 p) Serzedo (D)
- Sporting Pombal (CN) 1–0 (a.e.t.) Limianos (CN)
- Argozelo (D) 0–1 Alcains (D)
- Moura (CN) 2–0 Montalegre (D)
- U.D. Oliveirense (II) 2–0 União de Montemor (CN)
- Sporting de Espinho (CN) 1–0 AD Sanjoanense (CN)
- Mosteirense (D) 0–4 Salgueiros 08 (CN)
- Aljustrelense (CN) 0–3 Desportivo das Aves (II)
- Mafra (CN) 1–1 (2–3 p) Feirense (II)
- Vilaverdense (CN) 1–2 Gondomar (CN)
- Naval (CN) 0–2 (a.e.t.) Fafe (CN)
- Académico de Viseu (II) 1–2 Famalicão (CN)
- Trofense (II) 6–0 Febres (D)
- Vizela (CN) 4–3 (a.e.t.) Sousense (CN)
- Vila Real (CN) 2–3 Casa Pia (CN)
- Sourense (CN) 2–1 Santa Clara (II)
- Câmara de Lobos (D) 0–2 Mortágua (CN)
- Angrense (CN) 0–1 Vitória de Sernache (CN)
- Caldas (CN) 1–1 (1–3 p) Santa Maria (CN)
- Tirsense (CN) 1–1 (5–3 p) União de Leiria (CN)
- Freamunde (II) 2–1 Águeda (D)
- Boavista Ribeirinha (D) 0–3 Felgueiras 1932 (CN)
- Sacavenense (CN) 0–0 (1–3 p) Vieira (CN)
- Ribeirão (CN) 4–0 CD Gouveia (CN)
- Eléctrico (CN) 2–3 Tondela (II)
- Cova da Piedade (CN) 1–0 Silves (D)
- Atlético CP (II) 4–0 Moimenta da Beira (CN)
- Alcanenense (CN) 2–0 Lusitânia Lourosa (CN)
- Atlético Riachense (CN) 2–2 (3–2 p) Praiense (CN)
- Operário (CN) 1–1 (3–1 p) Lusitano Vildemoinhos (CN)
- Oriental (II) 3–2 (a.e.t.) Farense (II)
- Santa Eulália (CN) 2–1 Leixões (II)
- Olhanense (II) 2–0 Quarteirense (CN)
- Atlético de Reguengos (CN) 3–1 Paivense (D)
- Loures (CN) 2–2 (1–3 p) AD Oliveirense (CN)
- Portimonense (II) 1–2 Real Massamá (D)
- Amora (D) 3–2 (a.e.t.) União da Madeira (II)
- Atlético da Malveira (CN) 1–5 Varzim (CN)
- Benfica Castelo Branco (CN) 0–0 (5–4 p) Sertanense (CN)

== Third round ==
A total of 64 teams contested the third round: the 46 winners of the second round and the 18 teams competing in the Primeira Liga (I). The draw took place on Thursday, 2 October, at 12:00 WEST, and matches were played on 17–19 October 2014.

Number of teams per tier entering this round
Primeira Liga	Segunda Liga	Camp. Nac. Seniores	District FAs	Total
18 / 18	12 / 18	30 / 79	4 / 20	64 / 135

Fixtures

17 October 2014	Atlético (II)	3–0	(II) Beira-Mar	Lisbon
14:30	Jajá 32'; Silas 40' (pen.); Palacios 43'			Stadium: Estádio da Tapadinha; Referee: Ricardo Lourenço

18 October 2014	Pedras Salgadas (CN)	1–3 (a.e.t.)	(II) Trofense	Vila Pouca de Aguiar
14:30	Baba 35'		Simãozinho 78'; Santos 100'; Dário Júnior 105' (pen.)	Stadium: Complexo Desportivo de Vila Pouca de Aguiar; Referee: João Pinheiro

18 October 2014	Varzim (CN)	2–1	(I) Estoril	Póvoa de Varzim
15:00	Nelsinho 26' (pen.); Coentrão 43'		Tozé 31'	Stadium: Estádio do Varzim Sport Club; Referee: Duarte Gomes

18 October 2014	Olhanense (II)	2–4	(II) Oriental	Olhão
16:00	Buval 13'; Celestino 30'		Bastos 6', 45+2', 64' (pen.); Tom 66'	Stadium: Estádio José Arcanjo; Referee: Bruno Esteves

18 October 2014	Desportivo das Aves (II)	4–1	(I) Boavista	Vila das Aves
16:00	Platiny 30', 45+2'; Pereira 55'; Tito 61'		Mandiang 6'	Stadium: Estádio do Clube Desportivo das Aves; Referee: Carlos Xistra

18 October 2014	Porto (I)	1–3	(I) Sporting CP	Porto
17:00	Martínez 35'		Marcano 31' (o.g.); Nani 39'; Carrillo 83'	Stadium: Estádio do Dragão; Attendance: 36,869; Referee: Jorge Sousa

18 October 2014	Feirense (II)	5–1	(D) Amora	Santa Maria da Feira
19:00	Fonseca 23'; Rodrigues 48'; Pedró 70'; Cafú 76'; Phellype 90'		Tavares 2'	Stadium: Estádio Marcolino de Castro; Referee: Cosme Machado

18 October 2014	Sporting da Covilhã (II)	2–3	(I) Benfica	Covilhã
19:45	Traquina 9'; Silva 43'		Jonas 2' (pen.), 54', 71'	Stadium: Complexo Desportivo da Covilhã; Attendance: 7,000; Referee: Rui Costa

18 October 2014	Famalicão (CN)	2–1	(CN) Sporting de Pombal	Vila Nova de Famalicão
20:30	Medeiros 6'; Luiz Alberto 90+2'		Pinto 57' (pen.)	Stadium: Estádio Municipal 22 de Junho; Referee: Pedro Maia

19 October 2014	Vitória de Sernache (CN)	1–1 (a.e.t.) (1–4 p)	(CN) Vieira	Cernache do Bonjardim
14:30	Ribeiro 26' (pen.)		Lopes 2'	Stadium: Estádio Municipal Nuno Álvares Pereira; Referee: Sandro Soares

19 October 2014	Sourense (CN)	0–1	(CN) Santa Eulália	Soure
14:30			Costinha 90+4'	Stadium: Campo Dr. António Coelho Rodrigues; Referee: Hugo Pacheco

19 October 2014	Casa Pia (CN)	1–4 (a.e.t.)	(CN) Vizela	Lisbon
14:30	Rente 88'		Martins 53'; Cláudio 90+3' (pen.); Rafinha 97', 103'	Stadium: Estádio Pina Manique; Referee: Luís Reforço

19 October 2014	Mortágua (CN)	1–3	(CN) Fafe	Mortágua
14:30	Alves 8' (pen.)		Nuninho 47' (pen.); Herculano 70'; Silvestre 90+2'	Stadium: Campo da Gandarada; Referee: Luís Máximo

19 October 2014	Freamunde (II)	3–2 (a.e.t.)	(CN) Felgueiras 1932	Freamunde
15:00	Ansumane 78'; Raínho 89' (pen.); Leão 95'		Neves 32'; Moreira 70'	Stadium: Complexo Desportivo do SC Freamunde; Referee: Pedro Vilaça

19 October 2014	Marítimo (I)	4–0	(CN) Gondomar	Machico, Madeira
15:00	Costa 7'; Vidales 56'; Gallo 75'; Sousa 76'			Stadium: Estádio Municipal de Machico; Referee: Jorge Ferreira

19 October 2014	Coimbrões (CN)	0–1	(I) Rio Ave	Vila Nova de Gaia
15:00			Del Valle 39'	Stadium: Parque Silva Matos; Referee: Jorge Tavares

19 October 2014	Salgueiros 08 (CN)	1–3	(II) U.D. Oliveirense	Matosinhos
15:00	Onyeka 80'		Bru 21'; Lima 27'; Zé Pedro 34'	Stadium: Estádio do Padroense F.C. Referee: Hugo Miguel

19 October 2014	Chaves (II)	7–0	(CN) Cova da Piedade	Chaves
15:00	Santos 2'; Bá 15'; Reis 47', 50', 63', 65'; Fall 53'			Stadium: Estádio Municipal de Chaves; Referee: Manuel Mota

19 October 2014	Serzedo (D)	1–1 (a.e.t.) (7–8 p)	(CN) Sporting de Espinho	Vila Nova de Gaia
15:00	Faria 75'		Dias 59'	Stadium: Complexo Desportivo da Rainha; Referee: Ricardo Moreira
	Penalties
	Joãozinho (penalty scored); Viana (penalty scored); João Pedro (penalty scored); Belo (penalty scored); Moreira (penalty scored); Pacheco (penalty scored); Faria (penalty scored); Santos (penalty missed); André (penalty missed)		Lopes (penalty scored); Pereira (penalty scored); Willams (penalty scored); Capela (penalty scored); Marcos (penalty scored); Frederico (penalty scored); Hélder (penalty scored); Lapa (penalty missed); Stéphane (penalty scored)

19 October 2014	Atlético Riachense (CN)	2–1	(CN) Benfica Castelo Branco	Riachos (Torres Novas)
15:00	Lemos 6' (pen.); Alves 87'		Matos 33'	Stadium: Campo Coronel Mário Cunha; Referee: Nuno Roque

19 October 2014	Paços de Ferreira (I)	4–0	(CN) Atlético de Reguengos	Paços de Ferreira
15:00	Moreira 15', 27'; Paraíba 58'; Diogo Jota 66'			Stadium: Estádio Capital do Móvel; Referee: Paulo Baptista

19 October 2014	Ribeirão (CN)	2–0 (a.e.t.)	(CN) Torreense	Ribeirão (Vila Nova de Famalicão)
15:00	Gomes 105' (pen.); Boa Morte 115'			Stadium: Estádio do Passal; Referee: João Lamares

19 October 2014	Gil Vicente (I)	2–1	(D) Real Massamá	Barcelos
15:00	Mohsen 67'; Viana 87'		Fati 80'	Stadium: Estádio Cidade de Barcelos; Referee: Manuel Oliveira

19 October 2014	Penafiel (I)	2–2 (a.e.t.) (4–3 p)	(II) Tondela	Penafiel
15:00	Aldair 72'; Guedes 84' (pen.)		Santos 23'; Marreco 76'	Stadium: Estádio Municipal 25 de Abril; Referee: Artur Soares Dias

19 October 2014	Santa Maria (CN)	1–0	(I) Académica de Coimbra	Galegos (Barcelos)
15:00	Veiga 26' (pen.)			Stadium: Estádio da Devesa; Referee: João Capela

19 October 2014	Nacional (I)	6–1	(CN) Alcanenense	Funchal, Madeira
15:00	Kelvin 8' (o.g.); Rondón 16', 53'; J. Aurélio 20'; Matias 39'; Suk 48'		Kelvin 45' (pen.)	Stadium: Estádio da Madeira; Referee: Luís Ferreira

19 October 2014	Moura (CN)	0–2	(I) Vitória de Guimarães	Moura
15:00			Almeida 66' (o.g.); André 82' (pen.)	Stadium: Estádio do Moura A.C. Referee: Bruno Paixão

19 October 2014	A.D. Oliveirense (CN)	2–3 (a.e.t.)	(I) Belenenses	Santa Maria de Oliveira (Vila Nova de Famalicão)
15:00	Mendy 38' (pen.); Rodrigues 81'		Rosa 9'; Meira 61'; Nunes 99'	Stadium: Estádio das Ribes; Referee: Marco Ferreira

19 October 2014	Operário (CN)	3–1	(CN) Tirsense	Lagoa, Azores
15:00	Cristiano 9'; Peixoto 76'; Pinto 85' (o.g.)		Carvalho 46'	Stadium: Estádio João Gualberto Borges Arruda; Referee: Quitério Almeida

19 October 2014	Braga (I)	4–1	(D) Alcains	Braga
16:00	Tiba 6'; Marcelo Goiano 34'; Éder 66'; Sami 72'		Kabi 30'	Stadium: Estádio Municipal de Braga; Referee: Nuno Almeida

19 October 2014	Moreirense (I)	2–1	(CN) Pedras Rubras	Moreira de Cónegos
16:00	Arsénio 33'; Cardozo 87'		Biscoito 58'	Stadium: Parque de Jogos Comendador Joaquim de Almeida Freitas; Referee: Vasco Santos

19 October 2014	Vitória de Setúbal (I)	1–0	(I) Arouca	Setúbal
19:00	Rolim 23'			Stadium: Estádio do Bonfim; Referee: Olegário Benquerença

== Fourth round ==
A total of 32 teams contested the fourth round. The draw took place on Monday, 27 October, at 12:00 WET, and matches were played on 21–23 November 2014.

Number of teams per tier entering this round
Primeira Liga	Segunda Liga	Camp. Nac. Seniores	District FAs	Total
13 / 18	8 / 18	11 / 79	0 / 20	32 / 135

Fixtures

21 November 2014	Sporting de Espinho (CN)	0–5	(I) Sporting CP	Santa Maria da Feira
20:30			João Mário 32'; Capel 61'; Montero 68', 81'; Tanaka 77' (pen.)	Stadium: Estádio Marcolino de Castro; Referee: Vasco Santos

22 November 2014	Atlético (II)	0–2	(I) Marítimo	Lisbon
14:00			Vidales 52'; Sousa 76'	Stadium: Estádio da Tapadinha; Referee: Bruno Paixão

22 November 2014	Famalicão (CN)	4–0	(CN) Fafe	Vila Nova de Famalicão
15:00	Mércio 38'; Chico 59', 70'; Torres 80'			Stadium: Estádio Municipal 22 de Junho; Referee: André Gralha

22 November 2014	Rio Ave (I)	2–0	(II) U.D. Oliveirense	Vila do Conde
16:00	Lopes 75'; Koka 78'			Stadium: Estádio do Rio Ave; Referee: Paulo Baptista

22 November 2014	Trofense (II)	0–5	(I) Belenenses	Trofa
18:00			Caeiro 2'; Jairo 16' (o.g.); Camará 41'; Deyverson 72'; Silva 83'	Stadium: Estádio do C.D. Trofense; Referee: Bruno Esteves

22 November 2014	Benfica (I)	4–1	(I) Moreirense	Lisbon
19:45	Jonas 3', 7'; Salvio 22', 57'		Cardozo 26'	Stadium: Estádio da Luz; Attendance: 22,447; Referee: Jorge Tavares

23 November 2014	Vieira (CN)	0–1	(II) Freamunde	Vieira do Minho
14:00			Gbale 85'	Stadium: Estádio Municipal de Vieira do Minho; Referee: João Pinto

23 November 2014	Vizela (CN)	2–2 (a.e.t.) (4–2 p)	(CN) Operário	Vizela
14:00	Talocha 90+2'; Ferraz 120'		Léléco 46', 98'	Stadium: Estádio do F.C. Vizela; Referee: Pedro Campos

23 November 2014	Paços de Ferreira (I)	9–0	(CN) Atlético Riachense	Paços de Ferreira
15:00	Moreira 3', 36'; Cícero 7', 58', 90+2'; Minhoca 19', 68'; Diogo Jota 71'; Lopes 86'			Stadium: Estádio Capital do Móvel; Referee: Rui Rodrigues

23 November 2014	Penafiel (I)	1–0	(II) Desportivo das Aves	Penafiel
15:00	Martins 16'			Stadium: Estádio Municipal 25 de Abril; Referee: Luís Ferreira

23 November 2014	Gil Vicente (I)	1–1 (a.e.t.) (3–1 p)	(CN) Varzim	Barcelos
15:00	Vilela 32'		Nelsinho 30'	Stadium: Estádio Cidade de Barcelos; Referee: Olegário Benquerença
	Penalties
	Batista (penalty missed); Valente (penalty scored); Caetano (penalty scored); Jander (penalty missed); Viana (penalty scored)		Bijou (penalty missed); Cervantes (penalty missed); Sá (penalty scored); Nelsinho (penalty missed)

23 November 2014	Nacional (I)	2–0	(CN) Ribeirão	Funchal, Madeira
15:00	Suk 4'; Rondón 23' (pen.)			Stadium: Estádio da Madeira; Referee: Tiago Martins

23 November 2014	Santa Maria (CN)	2–1	(CN) Santa Eulália	Galegos (Barcelos)
15:00	Zakpa 75'; Freitas 89'		Cunha 28'	Stadium: Estádio da Devesa; Referee: António Costa

23 November 2014	Feirense (II)	0–2	(II) Chaves	Santa Maria da Feira
15:00			Santos 2'; João Mário 63'	Stadium: Estádio Marcolino de Castro; Referee: Manuel Mota

23 November 2014	Oriental (II)	1–0	(I) Vitória de Setúbal	Lisbon
17:00	Sene 47' (o.g.)			Stadium: Estádio da Tapadinha; Referee: Marco Ferreira

23 November 2014	Vitória de Guimarães (I)	1–2	(I) Braga	Guimarães
19:15	André 72' (pen.)		Rafa 39'; Pardo 41'	Stadium: Estádio D. Afonso Henriques; Referee: Duarte Gomes

== Fifth round ==
A total of 16 teams contested the fifth round. The draw took place on Thursday, 27 November, at 12:30 WET, and matches were played on 16–18 December 2014.

Number of teams per tier entering this round
Primeira Liga	Segunda Liga	Camp. Nac. Seniores	District FAs	Total
10 / 18	3 / 18	3 / 79	0 / 20	16 / 135

Fixtures

16 December 2014	Belenenses (I)	2–0	(II) Freamunde	Lisbon
20:00	Camará 34'; Pelé 90+3'			Stadium: Estádio do Restelo; Referee: Fábio Veríssimo

17 December 2014	Gil Vicente (I)	2–1	(I) Penafiel	Barcelos
15:00	Mohsen 79'; Evaldo 90+4'		Guedes 63' (pen.)	Stadium: Estádio Cidade de Barcelos; Referee: Marco Ferreira

17 December 2014	Nacional (I)	2–1	(CN) Santa Maria	Funchal, Madeira
15:00	Matias 27'; Suk 51'		Veiga 80' (pen.)	Stadium: Estádio da Madeira; Referee: Rui Costa

17 December 2014	Marítimo (I)	1–1 (a.e.t.) (9–8 p)	(II) Oriental	Funchal, Madeira
16:00	Maâzou 28'		Alves 89'	Stadium: Estádio dos Barreiros; Referee: Cosme Machado
	Penalties
	Gallo (penalty scored); Maâzou (penalty scored); Ferreira (penalty missed); Soares (penalty scored); Danilo (penalty scored); Briguel (penalty scored); Gegé (penalty scored); Bauer (penalty scored); Weeks (penalty scored); Salin (penalty missed); Gallo (penalty scored)		Almeida (penalty scored); Bastos (penalty scored); Grilo (penalty scored); Alves (penalty scored); Aguiar (penalty missed); Leonel (penalty scored); Tom (penalty scored); Gomes (penalty scored); João Pedro (penalty scored); Janota (penalty missed); Almeida (penalty missed)

17 December 2014	Rio Ave (I)	2–0	(II) Chaves	Vila do Conde
16:00	Gonçalves 45+1'; Ukra 88' (pen.)			Stadium: Estádio dos Arcos; Referee: Luís Ferreira

17 December 2014	Paços de Ferreira (I)	1–2	(CN) Famalicão	Paços de Ferreira
20:00	Urretaviscaya 86' (pen.)		Ricardo 2' (o.g.); Torres 52'	Stadium: Estádio Capital do Móvel; Referee: Vasco Santos

17 December 2014	Vizela (CN)	2–3	(I) Sporting CP	Moreira de Cónegos
20:00	Talocha 37', 45+2'		Martins 34' (pen.); Oliveira 39'; Mané 59'	Stadium: Parque de Jogos Comendador Joaquim de Almeida Freitas; Attendance: 4,000; Referee: Nuno Almeida

18 December 2014	Benfica (I)	1–2	(I) Braga	Lisbon
20:00	Jonas 33'		Santos 48'; Pardo 58'	Stadium: Estádio da Luz; Attendance: 28,234; Referee: Artur Soares Dias

== Quarter-finals ==
The draw for the quarter-finals took place on Monday, 22 December, at 12:30 WET, and matches were played on 6–8 January 2015.

Number of teams per tier entering this round
Primeira Liga	Segunda Liga	Camp. Nac. Seniores	District FAs	Total
7 / 18	0 / 18	1 / 79	0 / 20	8 / 135

Fixtures

6 January 2015	Rio Ave (I)	5–2	(I) Gil Vicente	Vila do Conde
20:15	Lopes 5'; Ukra 54' (pen.); Moreira 76'; Lionn 78'; Hassan 89'		Vilela 65'; Simy 72'	Stadium: Estádio dos Arcos; Referee: Artur Soares Dias

7 January 2015	Braga (I)	7–1	(I) Belenenses	Braga
19:00	Santos 16'; Rafa 22'; Rúben Micael 42'; Pardo 48'; Éder 68'; Alan 77'; Tiba 89'		Nunes 57'	Stadium: Estádio Municipal de Braga; Referee: Vasco Santos

7 January 2015	Sporting CP (I)	4–0	(CN) Famalicão	Lisbon
21:00	Carrillo 34'; João Mário 48'; Oliveira 69'; Montero 75'			Stadium: Estádio José Alvalade; Attendance: 11,683; Referee: Tiago Martins

8 January 2015	Marítimo (I)	1–1 (a.e.t.) (5–6 p)	(I) Nacional	Funchal, Madeira
20:00	Gallo 20' (pen.)		Matias 47' (pen.)	Stadium: Estádio dos Barreiros; Referee: Hugo Miguel
	Penalties
	Gallo (penalty scored); Maâzou (penalty scored); Danilo (penalty missed); Fransérgio (penalty scored); Ferreira (penalty scored); Xavier (penalty missed); Bauer (penalty scored); Ramsteijn (penalty missed)		(penalty scored) Christian; (penalty scored) Rodrigues; (penalty missed) Rondón; (penalty scored) Willyan; (penalty scored) Marçal; (penalty missed) Correia; (penalty scored) João; (penalty scored) J. Aurélio

== Semi-finals ==
The semi-final pairings were determined on 22 December 2014, following the draw for the quarter-finals. This round was contested over two legs in a home-and-away system, with the first leg played on 4 March and 7 April 2015 and the second leg played on 8 and 30 April 2015.

Number of teams per tier entering this round
Primeira Liga	Segunda Liga	Camp. Nac. Seniores	District FAs	Total
4 / 18	0 / 18	0 / 79	0 / 20	4 / 135

=== First leg ===
5 March 2015	Nacional (I)	2–2	(I) Sporting CP	Funchal, Madeira
20:15	L. Aurélio 50'; João 59'		Figueiredo 55'; Mané 83'	Stadium: Estádio da Madeira; Attendance: 2,500; Referee: Carlos Xistra

7 April 2015	Braga (I)	3–0	(I) Rio Ave	Braga
20:15	Zé Luís 16', 27', 51'			Stadium: Estádio Municipal de Braga; Attendance: 7,665; Referee: Jorge Sousa

=== Second leg ===
8 April 2015	Sporting CP (I)	1–0 (3–2 agg.)	(I) Nacional	Lisbon
20:00	Ewerton 85'			Stadium: Estádio José Alvalade; Attendance: 16,315; Referee: Hugo Miguel

30 April 2015	Rio Ave (I)	1–1 (1–4 agg.)	(I) Braga	Vila do Conde
20:00	Jebor 46'		Éder 43'	Stadium: Estádio dos Arcos; Attendance: 3,164; Referee: Duarte Gomes

== Final ==
31 May 2015
17:15 WEST

Sporting CP	2–2 (a.e.t.)	Braga
Slimani 84'; Montero 90+3'		Eder 16' (pen.); R. Silva 25'
Penalties
A. Silva (penalty scored); Nani (penalty scored); Slimani (penalty scored)	3–1	(penalty scored) Alan; (penalty missed) Pinto; (penalty missed) Eder; (penalty missed) Agra

Estádio Nacional, Oeiras
Attendance: 35,890
Referee: Marco Ferreira (Madeira)

== See also ==
- 2014–15 Primeira Liga
- 2014–15 Segunda Liga
- 2014–15 Campeonato Nacional
- 2014–15 Taça da Liga
