= Alexsander (footballer, born 2003) =

Brazilian footballer

Personal information
- Full name: Alexsander Cristhian Gomes da Costa
- Date of birth: 8 October 2003 (age 23)
- Place of birth: Rio de Janeiro, Brazil
- Height: 1.78 m (5 ft 10 in)
- Position: Midfielder

Team information
- Current team: Atlético Mineiro
- Number: 5

Youth career
- Fluminense

Senior career*
Years	Team	Apps	(Gls)
2022–2024	Fluminense	48	(2)
2024–2025	Al-Ahli	10	(0)
2025–	Atlético Mineiro	17	(1)

International career^{‡}
2023	Brazil U20	8	(0)
Medal record
Men's football
Representing Brazil
South American U-20 Championship
Winner	2023 Colombia
- * Club domestic league appearances and goals as of 7 April 2026 ‡ National team caps and goals as of 20:27, 29 March 2023 (UTC)

Alexsander Cristhian Gomes da Costa (born 8 October 2003), simply known as Alexsander, is a Brazilian footballer who currently plays as a midfielder for Campeonato Brasileiro Série A club Atlético Mineiro.

== Club career ==
=== Fluminense ===
Coach Fernando Diniz named Alexsander for his professional debut against São Paulo on November 6, 2022, resulting in a 3–1 victory. He played as a left-back and was engaged in a sequence in which the opposing goalkeeper parried his shot, resulting in Germán Cano's rebound goal. Alexsander also helped to Rafinha's ejection and provided a strong defensive effort. In addition to this encounter, he participated in two additional games that year, both as a left-back.

In his eighth appearance for Fluminense, Alexsander scored his first professional goal in a 7–0 victory over Volta Redonda on March 8, during the tenth round of the 2023 Campeonato Carioca. He netted the third goal following a pass from Ganso. He also scored in the second leg of the Campeonato Carioca final, which Fluminense won 4–1, overcoming Flamengo's 2–0 lead from the first leg

Alexsander rapidly established himself as a defensive midfielder and left-back with Fernando Diniz, thanks to his steady performances. However, he suffered a left knee injury during a match against Cruzeiro on May 10, 2023. Nearing the conclusion of his recuperation, he sustained another injury on June 13, damaging his right thigh, delaying his return to the field by three months. An assessment revealed that the team's performance dropped from 78% to 47% without Alexsander, underscoring his importance to the squad.

Fully recovered from his injuries in August, and was scheduled to play against América Mineiro (3–1 win) in the 2023 Campeonato Brasileiro Série A eight days later, but did not play. He returned in the closing moments of Fluminense's quarterfinal encounter against Olimpia in the 2023 Copa Libertadores, which the team won 3–1. He was part of the squad that won the Copa Libertadores for Fluminense, the club's first-ever title in the competition, defeating Boca Juniors 2–1 at the Maracanã.

In December 2023, Alexsander was ranked by the CIES as one of the top U21 prospects in the world, placing sixth on the list. He concluded the season having made 36 appearances.

In April 2024, Fluminense banned Alexsander, along with teammates John Kennedy, Arthur, and Kauã Elias, for disciplinary difficulties. During the pre-match preparations for their encounter against Vasco da Gama, the four invited women to their hotel. They also scheduled a "inappropriate" party at the hotel. This conduct disturbed several of those there, and a hotel staff reported the incident to Fluminense. On April 30, Alexsander was reintegrated into the squad.

=== Al-Ahli ===
In August 2024, Alexsander was transferred from Fluminense to Al-Ahli in Saudi Arabia for €9 million (approximately BRL 54 million). The Saudi club acquired 85% of his rights, while Fluminense retained a 15% stake in the player.

=== Atlético Mineiro ===
On 30 July 2025, Alexsander joined Atlético Mineiro on a contract running until December 2029.

== Career statistics ==
As of match played 7 December 2025

Club	Season	League			State league (Note: Includes Campeonato Carioca)		National cup (Note: Includes Copa do Brasil)		Continental		Total	
Club	Season	Division	Apps	Goals	Apps	Goals	Apps	Goals	Apps	Goals	Apps	Goals
Fluminense	2022	Série A	3	0	—		0	0	0	0	3	0
Fluminense	2023	Série A	19	0	7	2	2	0	7 (Note: Appearances in Copa Libertadores)	0	35	2
Fluminense	2024	Série A	15	0	4	0	2	0	4	0	25	0
Fluminense	Total		37	0	11	2	4	0	11	0	63	2
Al-Ahli	2024–25	Saudi Pro League	10	0	—		0	0	7 (Note: Appearances in AFC Champions League Elite)	0	17	0
Atlético Mineiro	2025	Série A	14	1	—		4	0	6 (Note: Appearances in Copa Sudamericana)	1	24	2
Career total			61	1	11	2	8	0	24	1	104	4

== Honours ==
Fluminense

- Copa Libertadores: 2023
- Recopa Sudamericana: 2024
- Campeonato Carioca: 2023
- Taça Guanabara: 2023

Al-Ahli

- AFC Champions League Elite: 2024–25

Brazil U20

- South American U-20 Championship: 2023
