= Tiago Martins =

Tiago Martins may refer to:

- Tiago Martins (referee) (born 1980), Portuguese referee
- Tiago Martins (footballer, born 1987), Portuguese footballer
- Tiago Luís Martins (born 1989), Brazilian footballer
- Tiago Martins (footballer, born 1998), Portuguese footballer

== See also ==
- Thiago Martins (disambiguation)
