= 2015 Taça de Portugal final =

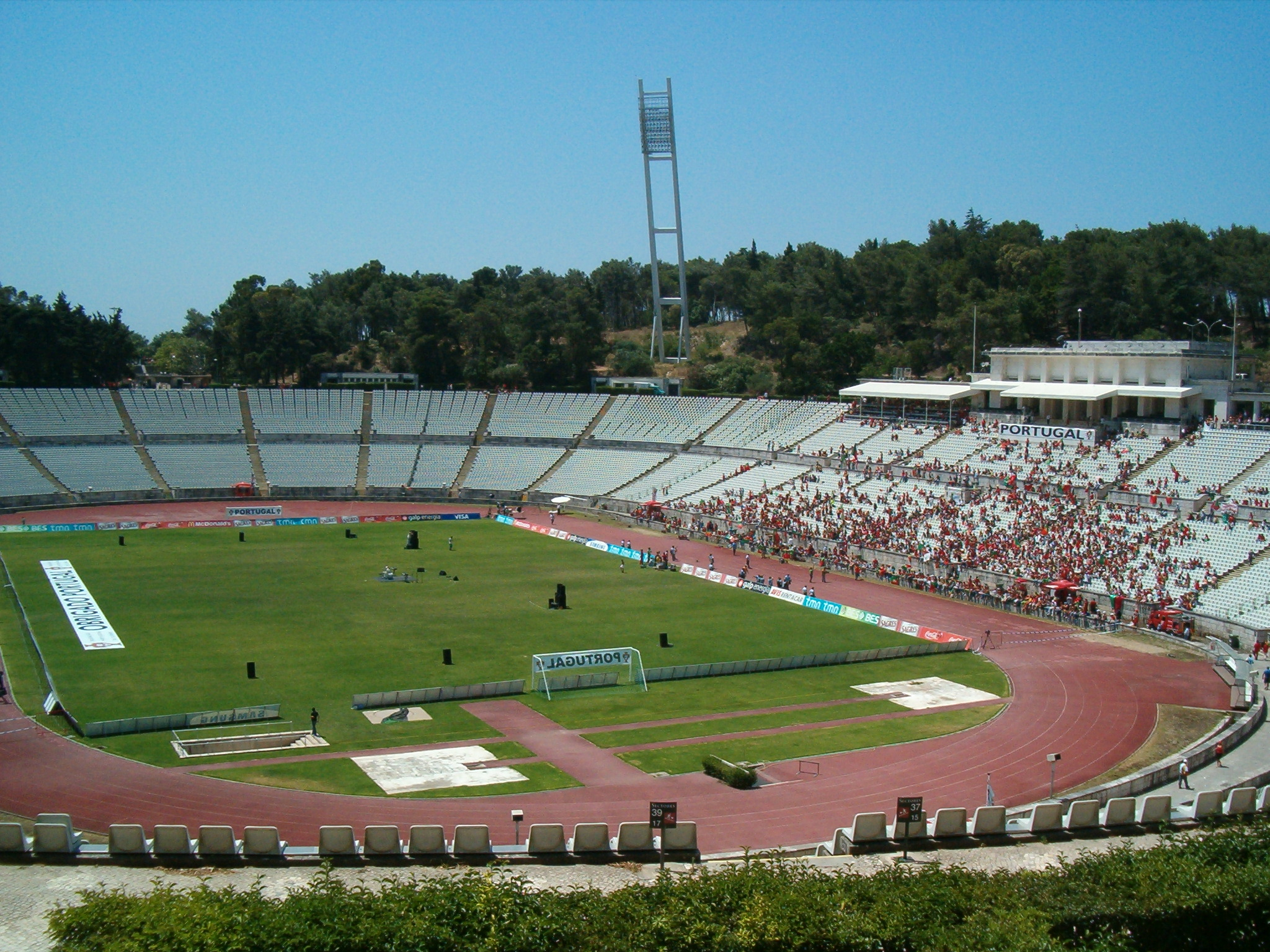
- Estádio Nacional
- Event: 2014–15 Taça de Portugal
Sporting CP	Braga
2	2
- After extra-time Sporting CP won 3–1 on penalties
- Date: 31 May 2015
- Venue: Estádio Nacional, Oeiras
- Man of the Match: Islam Slimani (Sporting CP)
- Fair Player of the Match: Rafa Silva (Braga)
- Referee: Marco Ferreira
- Attendance: 35,890

The 2015 Taça de Portugal final was the final match of the 2014–15 Taça de Portugal, the 75th season of the Taça de Portugal. It was played on 31 May 2015 at the Estádio Nacional in Oeiras between Sporting CP and Braga. Sporting CP won 3–1 on penalties following a 2–2 draw after extra-time to claim their 16th title in the competition and their first official trophy since the 2008 Supertaça Cândido de Oliveira. This was also the first time the Campeonato de Portugal/Taça de Portugal final was decided by a penalty shootout.

As the 2014–15 Taça de Portugal winners, Sporting CP earned the right to play in the 2015–16 UEFA Europa League group stage. However, since they qualified for the 2015–16 UEFA Champions League play-off round through their league placing, their cup winners place in the 2015–16 UEFA Europa League group stage is transferred to the highest-placed team in the league qualified for the UEFA Europa League (Braga), with the highest-placed team in the league that has not qualified to the European competitions (Belenenses) receiving a place in the third qualifying round.

Also, as cup winners, Sporting CP played against Benfica, the league winners, in the 2015 Supertaça Cândido de Oliveira, winning 1–0.

== Match ==
=== Details ===
31 May 2015
17:15 WEST

Sporting CP	2–2 (a.e.t.)	Braga
Slimani 84'; Montero 90+3'		Eder 16' (pen.); R. Silva 25'
Penalties
A. Silva (penalty scored); Nani (penalty scored); Slimani (penalty scored)	3–1	(penalty scored) Alan; (penalty missed) Pinto; (penalty missed) Eder; (penalty missed) Agra

Estádio Nacional, Oeiras
Attendance: 35,890
Referee: Marco Ferreira (Madeira)

Sporting	Braga

GK	1	(Portugal) Rui Patrício (c)
RB	41	(Portugal) Cédric	(red card) 14'
CB	5	(Brazil) Ewerton
CB	26	(Portugal) Paulo Oliveira
LB	4	(Brazil) Jefferson
DM	14	(Portugal) William Carvalho
CM	23	(Portugal) Adrien Silva
CM	17	(Portugal) João Mário		(substituted off) 21'
RW	18	(Peru) André Carrillo		(substituted off) 54'
CF	9	(Algeria) Islam Slimani
LW	77	(Portugal) Nani
Substitutes:
GK	22	(Brazil) Marcelo Boeck
DF	55	(Portugal) Tobias Figueiredo
MF	24	(Spain) Oriol Rosell
FW	36	(Portugal) Carlos Mané		(substituted on) 54'
DF	13	(Portugal) Miguel Lopes		(substituted on) 21' (substituted off) 74'
MF	8	(Portugal) André Martins
FW	10	(Colombia) Fredy Montero		(substituted on) 74'
Manager:
(Portugal) Marco Silva

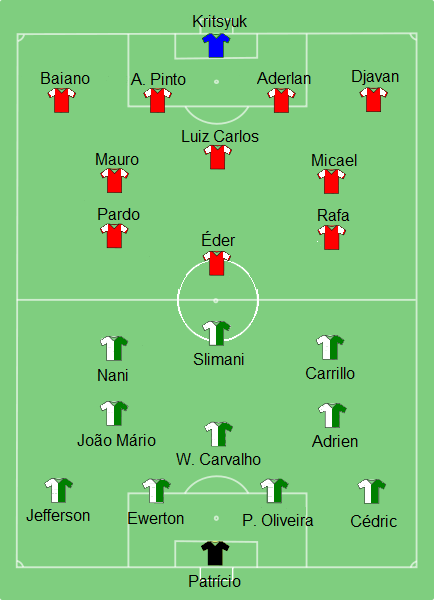

GK	1	(Russia) Stanislav Kritsyuk	(yellow card) 72'
RB	15	(Brazil) Baiano	(yellow card) 23'
CB	6	(Portugal) André Pinto
CB	33	(Brazil) Aderlan Santos
LB	16	(Brazil) Djavan		(substituted off) 82'
DM	8	(Brazil) Luíz Carlos	(yellow card) 48'
CM	63	(Brazil) Mauro	(yellow card) 38' (yellow-red card) 115'
CM	14	(Portugal) Rúben Micael		(substituted off) 61'
RW	90	(Colombia) Felipe Pardo		(substituted off) 75'
CF	17	(Portugal) Eder (c)	(yellow card) 54'
LW	18	(Portugal) Rafa Silva
Substitutes:
GK	92	(Brazil) Matheus
DF	2	(France) Vincent Sasso	(yellow card) 86'	(substituted on) 82'
MF	25	(Portugal) Pedro Tiba
FW	7	(Portugal) Salvador Agra		(substituted on) 75'
FW	23	(Portugal) Pedro Santos
FW	30	(Brazil) Alan		(substituted on) 61'
FW	20	(Cape Verde) Zé Luís
Manager:
(Portugal) Sérgio Conceição

Man of the match

- (Algeria) Islam Slimani (Sporting CP)

Match officials

- Assistant referees:
  - Tiago Trigo (Lisbon)
  - Sérgio Serrão (Madeira)
- Fourth official: Tiago Martins (Lisbon)

Match rules

- 90 minutes
- 30 minutes of extra-time if necessary
- Seven named substitutes
- Maximum of three substitutions

=== Statistics ===
First half
	Sporting CP	Braga
Goals scored	0	2
Total shots	9	3
Shots on target	3	3
Ball possession	60%	40%
Corner kicks	7	1
Fouls committed	4	15
Offsides	0	0
Yellow cards	0	2
Red cards	1	0

Second half
	Sporting CP	Braga
Goals scored	2	0
Total shots	10	5
Shots on target	6	5
Ball possession	46%	54%
Corner kicks	4	7
Fouls committed	7	8
Offsides	0	2
Yellow cards	0	4
Red cards	0	0

Extra time
	Sporting CP	Braga
Goals scored	0	0
Total shots	1	5
Shots on target	0	1
Ball possession	45%	55%
Corner kicks	1	1
Fouls committed	3	5
Offsides	0	0
Yellow cards	0	1
Red cards	0	1

Overall
	Sporting CP	Braga
Goals scored	2	2
Total shots	20	13
Shots on target	9	7
Ball possession	51%	49%
Corner kicks	12	9
Fouls committed	14	28
Offsides	0	2
Yellow cards	0	7
Red cards	1	1

== Broadcasting ==
The final was broadcast in Portugal on television by RTP (on RTP1), who holds the rights for several Portuguese Football Federation properties (which includes the Taça de Portugal final, the Supertaça Cândido de Oliveira and the Portugal national football team exhibition matches), and by SportTV (on SportTV 1) who holds the rights to broadcast the whole Taça de Portugal. RTP produced the broadcast, following FIFA guidelines for World Cup broadcasting. RTP also broadcast the match worldwide, on RTP Internacional.

== See also ==
- 2014–15 Sporting CP season
- 2015 Taça da Liga final
