= Rafinha =

Rafinha or Raphinha is the diminutive form of the given name Rafael. It can refer to:

== Brazilian footballers ==
- Rafinha (footballer, born 1982), Rafael Scapini de Almeida, midfielder and defender
- Rafinha (footballer, born 1983), Rafael da Silva Francisco, midfielder
- Rafinha (footballer, born 1985), Márcio Rafael Ferreira de Souza, right-back
- Rafinha (footballer, born 1987), Rafael dos Santos de Oliveira, striker
- Rafinha (footballer, born April 1988), Rafael Chagas Machado, left-back
- Rafinha (footballer, born 11 August 1988), Rafael Viana de Melo, left-back
- Rafinha (footballer, born 18 August 1988) (born 1988), Rafaela de Miranda Travalão, midfielder
- Rafinha (footballer, born 1989), Rafael Junior dos Santos Freire, midfielder
- Rafinha (footballer, born 1990), Rafael Gomes de Oliveira, midfielder
- Rafinha (footballer, born March 1992), Rafael de Sá Rodrigues, forward
- Rafinha (footballer, born June 1992), Rafael Diniz Alves e Silva, attacking midfielder
- Rafinha (footballer, born February 1993), Rafael Alcântara do Nascimento, midfielder
- Rafinha (footballer, born April 1993), Rafael Lima Pereira, winger
- Rafinha (footballer, born July 1993), Rafael Gimenes da Silva, defensive midfielder
- Rafinha (footballer, born 2006), Rafael Lima da Silva, defender
- Raphinha (born 1996), Raphael Dias Belloli, winger
- Raphinha (footballer, born 1993), Raphael David Thomaz, defender

== Other people ==
- Rafinha Cunha (born 1992), Sandro Rafael Veiga Cunha, Portuguese winger
- Rafael Rebello (born 1980), Brazilian mixed martial artist
