= 2015 Supertaça Cândido de Oliveira =

2015 Supertaça Cândido de Oliveira Vodafone
- Event: Supertaça Cândido de Oliveira (Portuguese Super Cup)
Benfica	Sporting CP
0	1
- Date: 9 August 2015
- Venue: Estádio Algarve, Faro/Loulé
- Man of the Match: André Carrillo (Sporting CP)
- Referee: Jorge Sousa
- Attendance: 28,717

The 2015 Supertaça Cândido de Oliveira was the 37th edition of the Supertaça Cândido de Oliveira. It took place on 9 August 2015, and it featured the winners of the 2014–15 Primeira Liga, Benfica, and the winners of the 2014–15 Taça de Portugal, Sporting CP. This edition was sponsored by Vodafone and was known as 2015 Supertaça Cândido de Oliveira Vodafone.

== Background ==
Benfica featured in their 17th Supertaça appearance. Their previous appearance was in 2014, where they defeated Rio Ave 3–2 on penalties at the Estádio Municipal de Aveiro. Benfica have won five Supertaças, in 1980, 1985, 1989, 2005 and 2014.

Sporting CP played in the fixture for the ninth time. Their last appearance was in 2008, where they defeated Porto 2–0 at the Estádio Algarve. Sporting CP have won seven Supertaças, in 1982, 1987, 1995, 2000, 2002, 2007 and 2008.

== Pre-match ==
=== Entry ===
Benfica qualified for their second consecutive Supertaça Cândido de Oliveira by clinching the league title. At matchday 33, Benfica drew 0–0 against Vitória de Guimarães at the Estádio D. Afonso Henriques to clinch the Primeira Liga for the 34th time.

Sporting CP qualified by winning the Taça de Portugal, defeating Braga 3–1 on penalties after a 2–2 draw. The 2015 victory was Sporting's 16th Taça de Portugal triumph.

=== Broadcasting ===
The final was once again broadcast by Rádio e Televisão de Portugal on RTP1 (and in HD on RTP HD).

== Match ==
=== Details ===
9 August 2015
20:45

Benfica	0–1	Sporting CP
	Report	Gutiérrez 53'

Estádio Algarve, Faro/Loulé
Attendance: 28,717
Referee: Jorge Sousa

Benfica	Sporting

GK	12	(Brazil) Júlio César
RB	50	(Portugal) Nélson Semedo
CB	2	(Argentina) Lisandro López
CB	33	(Brazil) Jardel
LB	28	(Portugal) Sílvio	(yellow card) 38'
DM	5	(Serbia) Ljubomir Fejsa	(yellow card) 50'
CM	7	(Greece) Andreas Samaris		(substituted off) 72'
RM	15	(Netherlands) Ola John		(substituted off) 81'
AM	30	(Brazil) Talisca		(substituted off) 56'
LW	10	(Argentina) Nico Gaitán (c)	(yellow card) 76'
CF	17	(Brazil) Jonas	(yellow card) 61'
Substitutes:
GK	1	(Brazil) Ederson
DF	34	(Portugal) André Almeida
DF	19	(Portugal) Eliseu
MF	21	(Portugal) Pizzi		(substituted in) 56'
FW	20	(Portugal) Gonçalo Guedes		(substituted in) 81'
FW	11	(Greece) Kostas Mitroglou		(substituted in) 72'
FW	25	(Uruguay) Jonathan Rodríguez
Manager:
(Portugal) Rui Vitória

GK	1	(Portugal) Rui Patrício
RB	21	(Portugal) João Pereira	(yellow card) 58'
CB	15	(Portugal) Paulo Oliveira
CB	44	(Brazil) Naldo
LB	4	(Brazil) Jefferson
DM	17	(Portugal) João Mário	(yellow card) 56'
CM	23	(Portugal) Adrien Silva (c)	(yellow card) 57'
CM	20	(Costa Rica) Bryan Ruiz		(substituted off) 86'
RW	18	(Peru) André Carrillo	(yellow card) 63'	(substituted off) 90+4'
LW	19	(Colombia) Teófilo Gutiérrez		(substituted off) 70'
CF	9	(Algeria) Islam Slimani	(yellow card) 17'
Substitutes:
GK	22	(Brazil) Marcelo Boeck
DF	35	(Portugal) Rúben Semedo		(substituted in) 86'
DF	55	(Portugal) Tobias Figueiredo
DF	3	(Argentina) Jonathan Silva
FW	60	(Portugal) Gelson Martins		(substituted in) 90+4'
FW	10	(Colombia) Fredy Montero
FW	36	(Portugal) Carlos Mané		(substituted in) 70'
Manager:
(Portugal) Jorge Jesus

== See also ==
- Derby de Lisboa
- 2015–16 Primeira Liga
- 2015–16 Taça de Portugal
- 2015–16 Taça da Liga
- 2015–16 S.L. Benfica season
- 2015–16 Sporting CP season
