= Thiago Martins =

Tiago Martins may refer to:

- Thiago Martins (actor), Brazilian actor
- Thiago Martins (footballer, born 1976), Brazilian football forward
- Thiago Martins (footballer, born 1995), Brazilian football centre-back

== See also ==
- Tiago Martins (disambiguation)
