= Pedro Tiba =

Portuguese footballer

Personal information
- Full name: Pedro Miguel Amorim Pereira Silva
- Date of birth: 31 August 1988 (age 38)
- Place of birth: Arcos de Valdevez, Portugal
- Height: 1.74 m (5 ft 9 in)
- Position: Attacking midfielder

Youth career
- 1997–1998: Ponte da Barca
- 1998–2000: ADECAS
- 2000–2005: ARC Paçô
- 2005–2007: Valdevez

Senior career*
Years	Team	Apps	(Gls)
2007–2009	Valdevez	41	(8)
2008	→ Kastoria (loan)	1	(0)
2009–2010	Valenciano	20	(3)
2010–2012	Limianos	57	(16)
2012–2013	Tirsense	30	(12)
2013–2014	Vitória Setúbal	24	(1)
2014–2018	Braga	41	(3)
2015–2016	→ Valladolid (loan)	28	(0)
2017–2018	→ Chaves (loan)	45	(11)
2018–2022	Lech Poznań	118	(11)
2019	Lech Poznań II	1	(0)
2022–2024	Gil Vicente	51	(4)
2024–2025	Chaves	20	(1)
Total		477	(70)
- * Club domestic league appearances and goals

Pedro Miguel Amorim Pereira Silva (born 31 August 1988), known as Pedro Tiba, is a Portuguese former professional footballer who played as an attacking midfielder.

== Club career ==
Born in Arcos de Valdevez, Viana do Castelo, Tiba played until the age of 25 in the Portuguese third division or lower. He represented during this timeframe C.A. Valdevez, S.C. Valenciano, A.D. Os Limianos and F.C. Tirsense. His professional debut was made, however, in the Greek second tier with Kastoria FC, for which he appeared from February to June 2008.

Tiba signed with Vitória F.C. in the Primeira Liga in summer 2013. He played his first game in the competition on 25 August, coming on as a second-half substitute in a 2–0 away loss against Rio Ave FC. He totalled 30 official appearances in his only season at the Estádio do Bonfim, scoring a late equaliser for a 1–1 home draw with S.C. Braga on 21 April 2014.

On 3 July 2014, Tiba joined Braga on a one-year contract for €500,000. He missed only two games in his debut campaign, one being for his dismissal for handball on 24 April 2015 after scoring in a 1–1 home draw against C.F. Os Belenenses. Previously, on 7 January, against the same opposition, he concluded a 7–1 win in the quarter-finals of the Taça de Portugal, but was an unused substitute in the final loss to Sporting CP.

On 31 August 2015, Tiba and teammate Erick Moreno were loaned to Spanish Segunda División club Real Valladolid in a season-long move. Subsequently, he spent the better part of the following two campaigns on loan at G.D. Chaves back in his homeland.

Tiba signed a three-year deal with Lech Poznań on 2 July 2018. He made his debut ten days later, against FC Gandzasar Kapan in the UEFA Europa League's first qualifying round. His maiden appearance in the Polish Ekstraklasa took place on the 22nd, and he scored in a 2–1 away victory over Wisła Płock.

In August 2020, Tiba agreed to an extension until 2022 with a one-year option. He won his first honour with the 2021–22 national championship, contributing 25 matches and two goals to the feat.

Tiba returned to Portugal on 24 June 2022, two months shy of his 34th birthday, on a two-year contract at Gil Vicente F.C. to replace Pedrinho who signed for a team in Turkey. He totalled 61 appearances during his tenure, scoring his first goal on 5 March 2023 in the 2–0 home defeat of C.S. Marítimo.

On 5 July 2024, Tiba returned to Chaves, recently relegated from the top division. In August 2025, he announced his retirement.

== International career ==
Tiba never played for Portugal at any youth level. In late August 2014, he was selected by full side manager Paulo Bento for a UEFA Euro 2016 qualifier against Albania to be played the following month in Aveiro, but did not take to the field in the 1–0 defeat.

== Career statistics ==
As of match played on 27 May 2023

Appearances and goals by club, season and competition
Club	Season	League			National cup (Note: Includes Taça de Portugal, Polish Cup)		Europe		Other		Total	
Club	Season	Division	Apps	Goals	Apps	Goals	Apps	Goals	Apps	Goals	Apps	Goals
Vitória Setúbal	2013–14	Primeira Liga	24	1	2	0	—		4 (Note: Appearances in Taça da Liga)	0	30	1
Braga	2014–15	Primeira Liga	32	3	3	1	—		—		35	4
Braga	2016–17	Primeira Liga	9	0	1	0	4 (Note: Appearances in UEFA Europa League)	0	4 (Note: Three appearances in Taça da Liga, one appearance in Supertaça Cândido de Oliveira)	0	18	0
Braga	Total		41	3	4	1	4	0	4	0	53	4
Valladolid	2015–16	Segunda División	28	0	1	0	—		—		29	0
Chaves	2016–17	Primeira Liga	14	2	2	0	—		—		16	2
Chaves	2017–18	Primeira Liga	31	9	1	0	—		1	1	33	10
Chaves	Total		45	11	3	0	—		1	1	49	12
Lech Poznań	2018–19	Ekstraklasa	33	4	2	0	5	0	—		40	4
Lech Poznań	2019–20	Ekstraklasa	32	2	4	0	—		—		36	2
Lech Poznań	2020–21	Ekstraklasa	28	3	3	0	8	3	—		39	6
Lech Poznań	2021–22	Ekstraklasa	25	2	2	0	—		—		27	2
Lech Poznań	Total		118	11	11	0	13	3	—		142	14
Lech Poznań II	2019–20	II liga	1	0	—		—		—		1	0
Gil Vicente	2022–23	Primeira Liga	26	1	2	0	3 (Note: Appearances in UEFA Europa Conference League)	0	2	0	33	1
Career total			282	27	22	1	20	3	11	1	335	32

== Honours ==
Lech Poznań

- Ekstraklasa: 2021–22
