= Paulo Oliveira =

Portuguese footballer (born 1992)

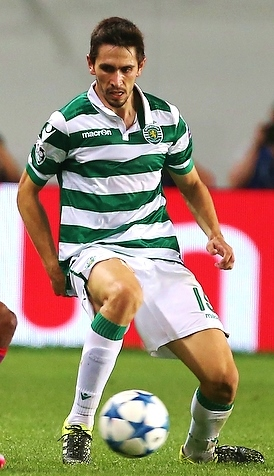
- Oliveira with Sporting CP in 2015

Personal information
- Full name: Paulo André Rodrigues Oliveira
- Date of birth: 8 January 1992 (age 34)
- Place of birth: Famalicão, Portugal
- Height: 1.87 m (6 ft 2 in)
- Position: Centre-back

Team information
- Current team: Al-Fayha
- Number: 15

Youth career
- 2000–2005: Famalicão
- 2005–2011: Vitória Guimarães

Senior career*
Years	Team	Apps	(Gls)
2010–2014	Vitória Guimarães	46	(1)
2011–2012	→ Penafiel (loan)	29	(0)
2012–2014	Vitória Guimarães B	22	(2)
2014–2017	Sporting CP	59	(1)
2016	Sporting CP B	2	(0)
2017–2021	Eibar	111	(1)
2021–2026	Braga	106	(2)
2026–	Al-Fayha	6	(0)

International career
2008	Portugal U17	1	(0)
2010	Portugal U18	5	(1)
2010–2011	Portugal U19	13	(1)
2012	Portugal U20	4	(1)
2012–2015	Portugal U21	23	(1)
2015	Portugal	1	(0)
Medal record
Men's football
Representing Portugal
UEFA European Under-21 Championship
Runner-up	2015 Czech Republic
- * Club domestic league appearances and goals as of 21:12, 15 October 2026 (UTC)

Paulo André Rodrigues Oliveira (born 8 January 1992) is a Portuguese professional footballer who plays as a centre-back for Saudi Pro League club Al-Fayha.

He made 211 Primeira Liga appearances for Vitória de Guimarães, Sporting CP and Braga, winning the Taça de Portugal with the first two clubs in 2013 and 2015 respectively. Abroad, he played regularly for four seasons with Eibar in La Liga.

Oliveira appeared in one match for Portugal, in 2015.

== Club career ==
=== Vitória Guimarães ===
Born in Vila Nova de Famalicão, Braga District, Oliveira was a youth product at Vitória de Guimarães, joining the club's ranks at the age of 13. He made his professional debut in the 2011–12 season, on loan to F.C. Penafiel in the Segunda Liga.

Oliveira returned for the 2012–13 campaign, but started with the reserves also in the second tier. His first official appearance with the main squad occurred on 5 January 2013, as he played the full 90 minutes in a 0–0 away draw against Gil Vicente F.C. in the Primeira Liga. He also contributed four appearances in the Minho team's successful campaign in the Taça de Portugal, including the final win over S.L. Benfica.

=== Sporting CP ===
On 19 May 2014, Oliveira signed a five-year deal with Sporting CP of the same league. He appeared in 40 competitive games in his first year and scored three goals, helping to a third-place finish and subsequent qualification for the UEFA Champions League; he made his debut in the competition on 30 September 2014, coming on as a 64th-minute substitute for Maurício in a 0–1 group stage home loss to Chelsea. The following 22 March, he was sent off in the 4–1 win over his previous club also at the Estádio José Alvalade.

Subsequently, Oliveira was only third or fourth-choice stopper for the Jorge Jesus-led side.

=== Eibar ===
On 17 July 2017, Oliveira moved to SD Eibar on a four-year contract; in the process, the €3.5 million transfer fee paid for his services became the Spanish club's highest ever, whilst Sporting remained entitled to 30% of his rights and a rebuy option after the first three years. He finished his first season in La Liga with 26 games, as his team finished in ninth place.

Oliveira scored his only goal in the Spanish top division on 17 August 2019, but he also put on past his own net in the 2–1 away defeat against RCD Mallorca. The following 4 January, he was dismissed at the end of a 1–0 loss at Valencia CF.

=== Braga ===
Oliveira returned to his country after Eibar's relegation, signing a four-year deal at S.C. Braga on 28 June 2021. He scored his first goal for the club on 26 September, opening a 1–1 draw at C.D. Santa Clara.

On 20 May 2025, aged 33, Oliveira renewed his expiring contract for a further season. He left in June 2026, with 165 appearances and five goals to his credit.

=== Later career ===
On 8 August 2026, Oliveira joined Saudi Pro League club Al-Fayha Club on a one-year contract.

== International career ==
Oliveira earned 46 caps for Portugal at youth level, including 23 for the under-21s. He made his only appearance for the full side on 31 March 2015, starting in a 2–0 friendly defeat against Cape Verde in Estoril.

== Personal life ==
Oliveira was cousin to fellow footballer Afonso Rodrigues.

== Career statistics ==
As of match played 16 May 2026

Appearances and goals by club, season and competition
Club	Season	League			National cup (Note: Includes Taça de Portugal, Copa del Rey)		League cup (Note: Includes Taça da Liga)		Continental		Other		Total	
Club	Season	Division	Apps	Goals	Apps	Goals	Apps	Goals	Apps	Goals	Apps	Goals	Apps	Goals
Penafiel (loan)	2011–12	Liga de Honra	29	0	2	0	8	0	0	0	0	0	39	0
Vitória Guimarães B	2012–13	Segunda Liga	20	1	0	0	0	0	—		0	0	20	1
Vitória Guimarães	2012–13	Primeira Liga	18	1	4	0	1	0	—		—		23	1
Vitória Guimarães	2013–14	Primeira Liga	28	0	2	0	0	0	6 (Note: Appearances in UEFA Europa League)	0	1 (Note: Appearance in Supertaça Cândido de Oliveira)	0	37	0
Vitória Guimarães	Total		46	1	6	0	1	0	6	0	1	0	60	1
Sporting CP	2014–15	Primeira Liga	27	1	6	2	0	0	7 (Note: Five appearances in UEFA Champions League, two appearances in UEFA Europa League)	0	0	0	40	3
Sporting CP	2015–16	Primeira Liga	19	0	3	0	3	0	5 (Note: Two appearances in UEFA Champions League, three appearances in UEFA Europa League)	0	1	0	31	0
Sporting CP	2016–17	Primeira Liga	13	0	3	1	1	0	2 (Note: Appearances in UEFA Champions League)	0	0	0	19	1
Sporting CP	Total		59	1	12	3	4	0	14	0	1	0	90	4
Sporting CP B	2015–16	Segunda Liga	2	0	—		—		—		—		2	0
Eibar	2017–18	La Liga	26	0	1	0	—		—		—		27	0
Eibar	2018–19	La Liga	28	0	1	0	—		—		—		29	0
Eibar	2019–20	La Liga	26	1	2	0	—		—		—		28	1
Eibar	2020–21	La Liga	31	0	0	0	—		—		—		31	0
Eibar	Total		111	1	4	0	0	0	0	0	0	0	115	1
Braga	2021–22	Primeira Liga	28	1	1	1	2	0	11	0	1	0	43	2
Braga	2022–23	Primeira Liga	20	0	6	1	2	0	8 (Note: Six appearances in UEFA Europa League, two appearances in UEFA Europa Conference League)	0	—		36	1
Braga	2023–24	Primeira Liga	20	0	2	0	3	0	3 (Note: One appearance in UEFA Champions League, two appearances in UEFA Europa League)	0	—		28	0
Braga	2024–25	Primeira Liga	21	1	1	0	1	0	6	0	—		29	1
Braga	2025–26	Primeira Liga	17	0	2	1	2	0	8	0	—		29	1
Braga	Total		106	2	12	3	10	0	36	0	1	0	165	5
Career total			373	6	36	6	23	0	56	0	3	0	491	12

== Honours ==
Vitória Guimarães

- Taça de Portugal: 2012–13

Sporting CP

- Taça de Portugal: 2014–15
- Supertaça Cândido de Oliveira: 2015

Braga

- Taça da Liga: 2023–24

Portugal U21

- UEFA European Under-21 Championship runner-up: 2015
