= Adrien Silva =

Portuguese footballer (born 1989)

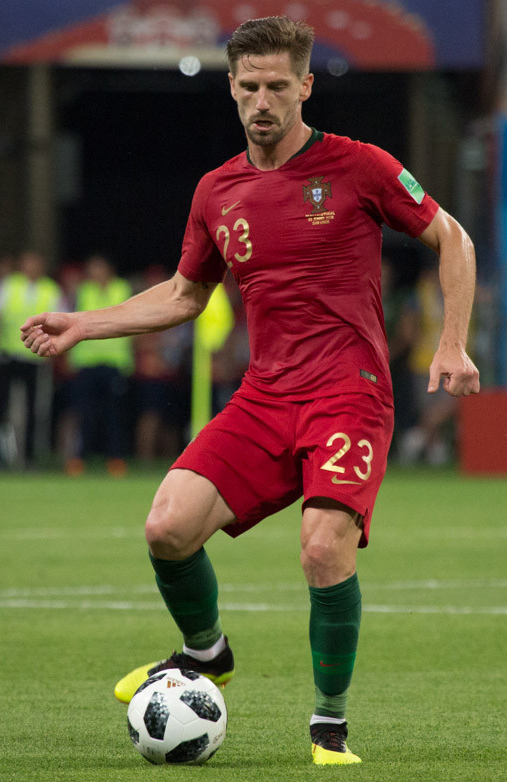
- Silva playing for Portugal at the 2018 World Cup

Personal information
- Full name: Adrien Sébastien Perruchet da Silva
- Date of birth: 15 March 1989 (age 37)
- Place of birth: Angoulême, France
- Height: 1.76 m (5 ft 9 in)
- Position: Midfielder

Youth career
- 1999–2000: Bordeaux
- 2000–2002: ARC Paçô
- 2002–2007: Sporting CP

Senior career*
Years	Team	Apps	(Gls)
2007–2017	Sporting CP	168	(32)
2010	→ Maccabi Haifa (loan)	6	(0)
2011–2012	→ Académica (loan)	34	(5)
2018–2020	Leicester City	14	(0)
2019–2020	→ Monaco (loan)	37	(0)
2020–2022	Sampdoria	41	(1)
2022–2023	Al Wahda	38	(7)
2024	Rio Ave	10	(0)
2024–2025	Dubai United	20	(3)
Total		368	(48)

International career
2004	Portugal U16	3	(0)
2005–2006	Portugal U17	17	(0)
2006–2007	Portugal U18	6	(2)
2007–2008	Portugal U19	7	(1)
2009–2010	Portugal U21	13	(1)
2013–2018	Portugal	26	(1)
Medal record
Men's football
Representing Portugal
UEFA European Championship
Winner	2016 France
FIFA Confederations Cup
Third place	2017 Russia
- * Club domestic league appearances and goals

Adrien Sébastien Perruchet da Silva ComM (French: [adʁijɛ̃ sebastjɛ̃ pɛʁyʃɛ da silva]; born 15 March 1989) is a former professional footballer who played as a midfielder.

He began his career with Sporting CP, making his first-team debut at the age of 18. In ten years with the club he played 241 games and scored 39 goals, and won the 2008 and 2015 Taça de Portugal trophies. He had loan spells with Maccabi Haifa and Académica, where he won the Portuguese Cup again. He signed with Leicester City in 2018, then served two loan stints at Monaco.

Born in France, Silva won 46 caps for Portugal at youth level, including 13 for the under-21 team. He made his senior debut in 2014 and played at Euro 2016 and the 2018 World Cup, winning the former tournament.

== Club career ==
=== Early years ===
Silva was born in Angoulême, Poitou-Charentes, France, to a Portuguese father and a French mother. He began his football career at the age of 10 with FC Girondins de Bordeaux, but after one year there his father, who worked in aeronautics, returned to Portugal and the family settled in Arcos de Valdevez. Silva spent two seasons with local Associação Recreativa e Cultural de Paçô, who later began to host a tournament in his honour, the A.R.C.Paçô–Adrien Silva Tournament, held every June.

Silva then spent six years in Sporting CP's academy, and won four national and three regional championships. At the age of 15 he was scouted by Chelsea, along with Portugal under-16 teammates Ricardo Fernandes and Fábio Ferreira, and the three players trained at the English club's facilities in January 2005. Sporting filed a complaint with FIFA that Chelsea had not followed the correct procedures, and Silva stayed with Sporting, although Fernandes and Ferreira did later move to the London club.

=== Sporting CP ===
In March 2007, Silva signed his first professional contract, agreeing to a five-year deal with Sporting. In July, after spending the final two months of the season playing with the reserve team, he was officially promoted to the main squad by manager Paulo Bento ahead of the upcoming campaign. He made his Primeira Liga debut on 17 August, taking the field as a late substitute in a 4–1 home win against Académica de Coimbra; on 12 December, after appearing as an unused substitute in several league and European matches, he made his first professional start and Champions League debut in a 3–0 victory over FC Dynamo Kyiv. Four days later, he made his first start in the league in a 2–1 win at C.S. Marítimo.

Silva featured in both legs of Sporting's round of 32 win against Bolton Wanderers in the 2007–08 UEFA Cup. On 16 April he started in the 5–3 win over S.L. Benfica in the semi-finals of the Taça de Portugal, being replaced after only 35 minutes in what was the last of his 15 appearances of the season.

As in his first year, Silva struggled for minutes in 2008–09. He played his first match on 22 November 2008 in a 1–0 league defeat of Associação Naval 1º de Maio, playing 16 minutes off the bench. He made his first start in a 3–0 home win against Marítimo in the Taça da Liga, and he also made Bento's starting XI three months later in the Lions' 7–1 loss to FC Bayern Munich in the Champions League last 16 second leg. He made 19 appearances in all competitions, notably playing the full 90 minutes in home wins against of C.F. Estrela da Amadora and C.D. Nacional.

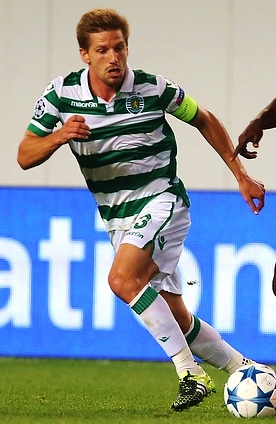
Silva with Sporting CP in August 2015

Silva scored his first career goal in a UEFA Europa League group stage match against Hertha BSC, the match-winner in a 1–0 win, when he also was sent off after collecting a second yellow card in injury time. On 28 November 2009, in the Lisbon derby, which ended 0–0, he made headlines in the Portuguese media because he covered the most distance of any Sporting player, having traveled over 10,049 metres (6.244 mi). Coach Carlos Carvalhal started him in 13 of the team's next 15 matches, but he eventually fell out of favour, as Sporting went on to finish in only fourth place with 48 points, the club's worst points total since the 1992–93 campaign.

On 27 June 2010, it was announced that Silva would be joining Israeli side Maccabi Haifa F.C. on a season-long loan deal. The move was facilitated by the player's agent Pini Zahavi, based in Tel Aviv. He made his debut for his new team on 29 July, in the first leg of the Europa League third qualifying round tie against FC Dinamo Minsk; he was rarely played in the Israeli Premier League, but was a regular in the campaign in the Toto Cup.

In January 2011, it was reported that Silva was considering going back to Portugal to regain match fitness. On the 16th, he spoke of his desire, telling daily sports newspaper A Bola: "Returning to Portugal is an option that I like a lot since I can be followed more closely. In Israel, I don't have great visibility"; Three days later, a six-month loan to Académica de Coimbra was confirmed.

Silva found the net in his first appearance with the Students, who were defeated 2–1 away against S.C. Olhanense. He was again used rarely, but now due to injury problems – he fractured the fifth metatarsal in his right foot in a game with U.D. Leiria in March, which sidelined him for the rest of the season.

On 5 July 2011, Sporting and Académica extended the loan for a further season. On 26 September, completely recovered from his injury, Silva scored his first career brace in a 4–0 home win against C.D. Feirense; on 19 November, in the fourth round of the Portuguese Cup, he scored his team's second in a 3–0 shock victory over Porto, adding another double in the next round against Leixões SC (5–2 after extra time). He played the full 90 minutes in the final, a 1–0 defeat of Sporting which saw the Coimbra side lift their first domestic cup in 73 years.

After returning to Sporting, Silva was awarded the club's Player of the Year award on 28 November 2013. He scored a career-best ten competitive goals in the 2014–15 season, while also helping the team reach and win the final of the Portuguese Cup.

In August 2016, Silva confirmed in an interview with Portuguese newspaper O Jogo that Leicester City were interested in signing him. However, a deal could not be agreed on deadline day as Sporting wanted the club to pay his £38.5 million release clause. After the move was finally completed, he returned to Lisbon on 1 October 2017 and wished his former fans an emotional farewell before the 0–0 draw with FC Porto.

=== Leicester City ===
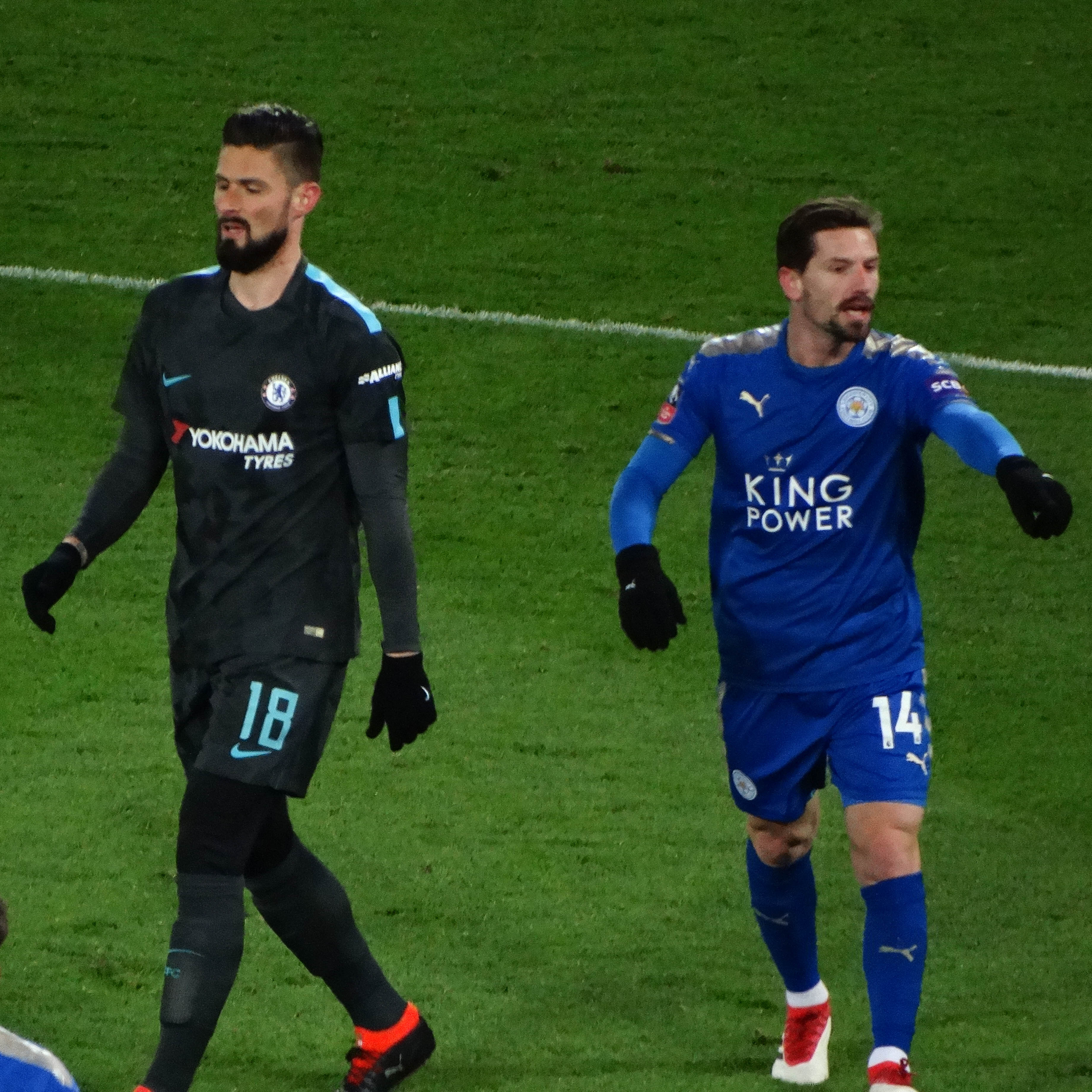
Silva (right) playing for Leicester City in an FA Cup match against Chelsea in March 2018

On 31 August 2017, Sporting agreed a £22 million fee for Silva to move to Leicester City, pending international clearance. The documents relating to his transfer did not reach FIFA until 14 seconds after the deadline; thus, he remained ineligible to play for the club until the next transfer window. In a statement on 24 October, Leicester chose not to appeal to the Court of Arbitration for Sport as it was made clear to them that "FIFA will not support an expedited process"; in an interview with The Guardian in March 2018, he said it was "a very poor decision" by FIFA, despite his appeals, to uphold his ban.

Silva was officially registered on 1 January 2018, and made his debut that same day as a late substitute in a 3–0 win at home to Huddersfield Town in the Premier League. He was given the number 14 jersey, referring to his transfer difficulties. In a 2–0 defeat of Watford on 20 January, he came on for Jamie Vardy in the 89th minute and provided the assist for Riyad Mahrez's goal in stoppage time.

Silva struggled for game time under manager Claude Puel, having not started a league match since 10 August 2018. He made only five appearances in all competitions, and was not included in the squad for a league match after 22 September. Puel's decision to leave Silva out of the first team and make him train with the under-23s was criticised by Silva's father, who accused Puel of unfairly "picking on his son".

On 31 January 2019, Silva joined AS Monaco FC – coached by his compatriot Leonardo Jardim – on loan until June, with Youri Tielemans moving in the opposite direction. He made his Ligue 1 debut on 2 February, playing 18 minutes in the 2–1 home victory over Toulouse FC after replacing fellow Portuguese Gelson Martins.

Despite a change of Leicester manager prior to 2019–20, Silva was still told that he was free to leave the club. On 23 August 2019, he rejoined Monaco on another loan. He contributed two assists in 22 appearances, before the season was abruptly concluded due to the COVID-19 pandemic.

=== Sampdoria ===
During a pre-match press conference ahead of the 2020–21 campaign, Leicester coach Brendan Rodgers said that Silva's future "will be outside of here". In October 2020, a financial agreement was reached to terminate the former's contract while he finalised a move to UC Sampdoria. Shortly after, the Italian club announced his signing on a two-year deal.

On 3 January 2022, Silva's contract was terminated by mutual consent.

=== Later career ===
Silva joined Al Wahda FC of the UAE Pro League on 4 January 2022, on a two-year deal. He returned to Portugal in January 2024, with the 34-year-old agreeing to a short-term contract at top-tier Rio Ave FC.

== International career ==
=== Youth ===
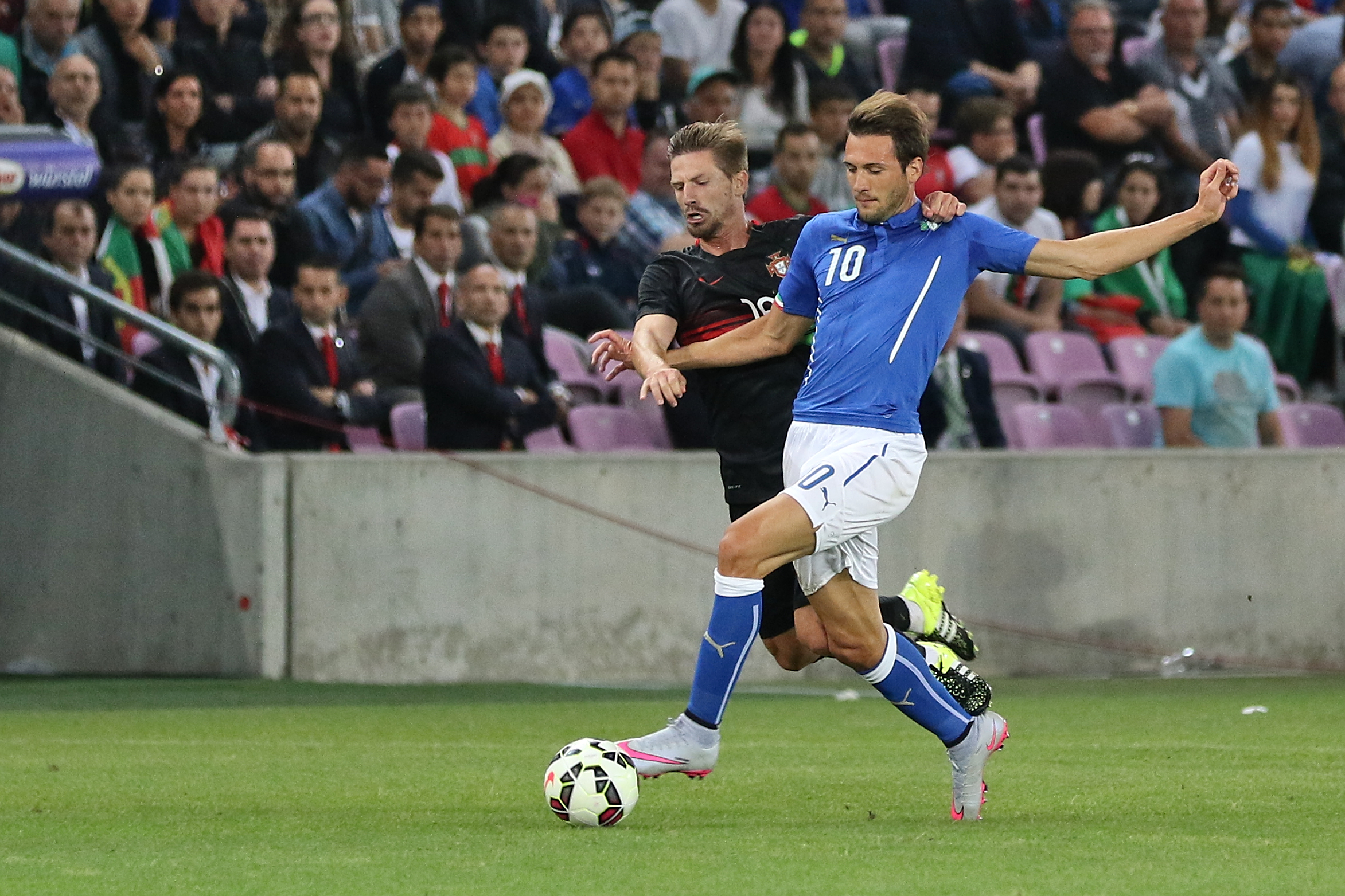
Silva contesting possession of the ball with Italy's Franco Vázquez in a June 2015 friendly

Though born in France, Silva elected to play for Portugal, and represented the country at every youth level. With the under-16s he appeared at the Tournoi du Val-de-Marne, featuring in all three group stage matches – however, after he was found to have done unauthorised training with Chelsea, he was suspended by the Portuguese Football Federation. He played with the under-17 team as they attempted to qualify for the 2007 UEFA European Championship, being a regular as the side eventually fell short in the elite round.

On 30 January 2007, the Portuguese Federation announced that Silva would be participating in the 2007 Meridian Cup (for under-18 players) as the country's only representative, and he declared that he was "very proud to represent Portugal in a European selection". However, prior to the start of the competition, he suffered an injury and was replaced by compatriot Romeu Ribeiro.

Silva was limited to only seven appearances with the Portuguese under-19s, due to his increased involvement with Sporting's first team. He scored his first goal in the age group on 6 November 2007, in the first round of qualification for the 2008 European Championship against the Republic of Ireland; despite a 2–1 victory, Portugal failed to progress past the elite stages.

On 5 February 2009, Silva earned his first call up to the under-21 team under coach Rui Caçador, for a friendly match with Switzerland that was played five days later. He started and played 78 minutes, before being substituted in a 3–1 win. He was a regular participant in the qualification campaign for the 2011 European Championships, appearing in five out of nine matches and scoring in a 1–1 draw to Macedonia.

=== Senior ===
Silva was called up by new Portugal coach Fernando Santos for a friendly in France on 11 October 2014, but did not play in the 1–2 defeat. He made his senior international debut in another friendly, replacing André Gomes midway through the second half of a 1–0 win over Argentina at Old Trafford on 18 November.

Silva was selected for the Euro 2016 squad. His first game in the tournament took place on 25 June, when he played the full 120 minutes in the round of 16 clash against Croatia, a 1–0 win after extra time.

Having also been picked for the 2017 FIFA Confederations Cup, Silva contributed four appearances as Portugal finished third. He scored his first goal for his country on 2 July, a 104th-minute penalty to help defeat Mexico 2–1 in the third place play-off.

Silva was selected for the 2018 World Cup.

== Style of play ==
Mainly a central midfielder, Silva was known for his dribbling and passing skills.

== Career statistics ==
=== Club ===
As of match played 17 May 2024

Appearances and goals by club, season and competition
Club	Season	League			Cup (Note: Includes Taça de Portugal, Taça da Liga, Israel State Cup, Toto Cup, FA Cup, EFL Cup and Coppa Italia matches)		Continental		Other (Note: Includes Supertaça Cândido de Oliveira, UEFA Super Cup and FIFA Club World Cup matches)		Total	
Club	Season	Division	Apps	Goals	Apps	Goals	Apps	Goals	Apps	Goals	Apps	Goals
Sporting CP	2007–08	Primeira Liga	6	0	5	0	4	0	0	0	15	0
Sporting CP	2008–09	Primeira Liga	13	0	4	0	2	0	0	0	19	0
Sporting CP	2009–10	Primeira Liga	13	0	7	0	4	1	—		24	1
Sporting CP	2012–13	Primeira Liga	19	3	3	0	4	0	—		26	3
Sporting CP	2013–14	Primeira Liga	28	8	5	1	0	0	—		33	9
Sporting CP	2014–15	Primeira Liga	30	8	4	0	8	2	—		42	10
Sporting CP	2015–16	Primeira Liga	29	8	3	1	8	0	1	0	41	9
Sporting CP	2016–17	Primeira Liga	27	4	3	1	5	1	1	0	36	6
Sporting CP	2017–18	Primeira Liga	3	1	0	0	2	0	—		5	1
Sporting CP	Total		168	32	34	3	37	4	2	0	241	39
Maccabi Haifa (loan)	2010–11	Israeli Premier League	6	0	0	0	2	0	—		8	0
Académica (loan)	2010–11	Primeira Liga	6	1	2	0	—		—		8	1
Académica (loan)	2011–12	Primeira Liga	28	4	9	3	—		—		37	7
Académica (loan)	Total		34	5	11	3	—		—		45	8
Leicester City	2017–18	Premier League	12	0	4	0	—		—		16	0
Leicester City	2018–19	Premier League	2	0	3	0	—		—		5	0
Leicester City	Total		14	0	7	0	—		—		21	0
Monaco (loan)	2018–19	Ligue 1	15	0	0	0	0	0	—		15	0
Monaco (loan)	2019–20	Ligue 1	22	0	3	0	—		—		25	0
Monaco (loan)	Total		37	0	3	0	—		—		40	0
Sampdoria	2020–21	Serie A	24	1	2	0	—		—		26	1
Sampdoria	2021–22	Serie A	17	0	1	0	—		—		18	0
Sampdoria	Total		41	1	3	0	—		—		44	1
Al Wahda	2021–22	UAE Pro League	13	3	—		—		—		13	3
Al Wahda	2022–23	UAE Pro League	25	4	3	0	—		—		28	4
Al Wahda	Total		38	7	3	0	—		—		41	7
Rio Ave	2023–24	Primeira Liga	10	0	—		—		—		10	0
Career total			348	43	61	6	39	4	2	0	450	53

=== International ===
Appearances and goals by national team and year
National team	Year	Apps	Goals
Portugal	2014	1	0
Portugal	2015	4	0
Portugal	2016	10	0
Portugal	2017	5	1
Portugal	2018	6	0
Total		26	1

Scores and results list Portugal's goal tally first, score column indicates score after each Silva goal.

List of international goals scored by Adrien Silva
No.	Date	Venue	Opponent	Score	Result	Competition
1	2 July 2017	Otkrytiye Arena, Moscow, Russia	Mexico	2–1	2–1 (a.e.t.)	2017 FIFA Confederations Cup

== Honours ==
Sporting CP

- Taça de Portugal: 2007–08, 2014–15
- Supertaça Cândido de Oliveira: 2007, 2008, 2015

Maccabi Haifa

- Israeli Premier League: 2010–11

Académica

- Taça de Portugal: 2011–12

Portugal

- UEFA European Championship: 2016
- FIFA Confederations Cup third place: 2017

Individual

- Sporting CP Footballer of the Year: 2013
- SJPF Primeira Liga Team of the Year: 2016

Orders

- Commander of the Order of Merit
