= Tobias Figueiredo =

Portuguese footballer

- Figueiredo with Jeju SK FC in 2026

Personal information
- Full name: Tobias Pereira Figueiredo
- Date of birth: 2 February 1994 (age 32)
- Place of birth: Sátão, Portugal
- Height: 1.88 m (6 ft 2 in)
- Position: Centre-back

Team information
- Current team: Jeju SK
- Number: 2

Youth career
- 2004–2006: Penalva
- 2006–2013: Sporting CP

Senior career*
Years	Team	Apps	(Gls)
2012–2016	Sporting CP B	49	(1)
2014–2018	Sporting CP	15	(2)
2014	→ Reus (loan)	13	(1)
2016–2017	→ Nacional (loan)	22	(1)
2018	→ Nottingham Forest (loan)	12	(0)
2018–2022	Nottingham Forest	101	(3)
2022–2023	Hull City	22	(0)
2023–2026	Fortaleza	4	(0)
2024	→ Criciúma (loan)	29	(2)
2025	→ Athletico Paranaense (loan)	9	(1)
2026–	Jeju SK	9	(2)

International career
2009	Portugal U15	2	(0)
2009–2011	Portugal U17	23	(3)
2012	Portugal U18	5	(1)
2012–2013	Portugal U19	10	(1)
2013–2014	Portugal U20	6	(0)
2014–2017	Portugal U21	16	(1)
2016	Portugal U23	4	(1)
Medal record
Men's football
Representing Portugal
UEFA European Under-21 Championship
Runner-up	2015 Czech Republic
- * Club domestic league appearances and goals as of 3 August 2026

Tobias Pereira Figueiredo (born 2 February 1994) is a Portuguese professional footballer who plays as a central defender for K League 1 club Jeju SK.

Formed at Sporting CP, where he made 30 first-team appearances, he had loans in Spain, Portugal and England before signing permanently for Nottingham Forest, where he played 113 EFL Championship games.

Figueiredo earned 66 caps for Portugal at youth level, scoring seven goals. He was part of their team at the 2016 Olympics.

== Club career ==
=== Sporting CP ===
Born in Sátão, Viseu District, Figueiredo joined Sporting CP's youth setup in 2006 at the age of 12, after starting out at S.C. Penalva do Castelo. He was promoted to the reserves in the summer of 2012, and made his professional debut on 11 August by starting in a 1–0 away loss against U.D. Oliveirense in the Segunda Liga.

On 29 January 2014, Figueiredo was loaned to Spanish club CF Reus Deportiu until June, alongside Sporting teammate Alexandre Guedes. An undisputed starter during his time in the Segunda División B, he returned to the Lions in June 2014 and was promoted to the main squad in January of the following year.

Figueiredo made his Primeira Liga debut on 18 January 2015, playing the full 90 minutes in a 4–2 home win against Rio Ave FC. He scored his first goal in the competition on 1 February, closing the 3–1 victory at F.C. Arouca. A month later, he added another in the first leg of the semi-finals of the Taça de Portugal against C.D. Nacional, as the latter tournament was eventually won with him as an unused substitute.

On 30 April 2015, Figueiredo extended his contract with Sporting until 2021. On 28 June of the following year, deemed surplus to requirements by manager Jorge Jesus, he was loaned to fellow top-division Nacional. He scored his only goal in a 1–3 home loss to S.L. Benfica, as the season ended in relegation in last place.

=== Nottingham Forest ===
On 30 January 2018, completely ostracised by manager Jorge Jesus, Figueiredo signed on loan with English Championship side Nottingham Forest until the end of the campaign. He made his debut on 17 February, playing the entire 0–0 away draw against Burton Albion.

On 20 April 2018, it was announced that Figueiredo would join Forest on a permanent four-year deal on 1 July, for an undisclosed fee. He was sent off on 28 November in a 5–5 draw at Aston Villa, for a bad foul on John McGinn while winning 4–3. The day before the anniversary of that match, he scored his first goal in English football to open a 4–0 victory away to Queens Park Rangers from Joe Lolley's corner kick.

In January 2022, Figueiredo was tracked for a transfer to Vitória de Guimarães, first as a loan and later as a free transfer pending the termination of his Forest contract. The deal collapsed as the City Ground club did not submit the documentation on time. He did not feature in May's playoffs as the Reds ended their 23-year absence from the Premier League with a 1–0 final win over Huddersfield Town.

Figueiredo left on 30 June 2022 as his contract expired.

=== Hull City ===
On 28 June 2022, Figueiredo signed a two-year contract with Hull City, with the club holding an option for an extra year. He made his debut on 30 July, starting in the 2–1 home win against Bristol City. On 17 September he made mistakes that led to two goals in a 3–0 loss at Swansea City; he took no part from January onwards as new manager Liam Rosenior preferred Alfie Jones and Sean McLoughlin in central defence.

=== Brazil ===
On 11 July 2023, Figueiredo signed a three-year contract with Fortaleza Esporte Clube; the Brazilian club acquired 70% of his economic rights for an undisclosed fee. In March 2024, he was loaned to fellow Série A side Criciúma Esporte Clube. He scored his first goal for the latter later that month, heading home from a corner kick in a 2–1 away win over Brusque Futebol Clube in the Campeonato Catarinense.

Figueiredo joined Club Athletico Paranaense of Série B in February 2025, also on loan. He left Fortaleza on 16 March 2026.

=== Later career ===
On 17 March 2026, aged 32, Figueiredo agreed to a deal at Jeju SK FC in the K League 1.

== International career ==
Figueiredo participated in two UEFA European Under-21 Championship editions with Portugal, playing twice in 2015 for the runners-up. He won his first cap at that level on 13 November 2014, in a 3–1 friendly defeat to England at Turf Moor.

Figueiredo was also picked by manager Rui Jorge for his squad that appeared at the 2016 Summer Olympics. He featured in all the matches in Rio de Janeiro, in an eventual quarter-final exit.

== Personal life ==
Figueiredo's older brother, Cristiano, was also a footballer. He played his youth football with S.C. Braga.

== Career statistics ==
As of match played 24 May 2025

Appearances and goals by club, season and competition
Club	Season	League			State league		National cup (Note: Includes Taça de Portugal, FA Cup, Copa do Brasil)		League cup (Note: Includes Taça da Liga, EFL Cup)		Continental		Other		Total	
Club	Season	Division	Apps	Goals	Apps	Goals	Apps	Goals	Apps	Goals	Apps	Goals	Apps	Goals	Apps	Goals
Sporting CP B	2012–13	Segunda Liga	18	0	—		—		—		—		—		18	0
Sporting CP B	2013–14	Segunda Liga	7	0	—		—		—		—		—		7	0
Sporting CP B	2014–15	Segunda Liga	17	1	—		—		—		—		—		17	1
Sporting CP B	2015–16	LigaPro	5	0	—		—		—		—		—		5	0
Sporting CP B	2017–18	LigaPro	2	0	—		—		—		—		—		2	0
Sporting CP B	Total		49	1	—		—		—		—		—		49	1
Reus (loan)	2013–14	Segunda División B	13	1	—		—		—		—		—		13	1
Sporting CP	2014–15	Primeira Liga	14	2	—		2	1	2	0	2 (Note: Appearances in UEFA Europa League)	0	—		20	3
Sporting CP	2015–16	Primeira Liga	1	0	—		1	0	0	0	4	1	0	0	6	1
Sporting CP	2016–17	Primeira Liga	0	0	—		0	0	0	0	0	0	—		0	0
Sporting CP	2017–18	Primeira Liga	0	0	—		2	0	1	0	1 (Note: Appearance in UEFA Champions League)	0	—		4	0
Sporting CP	Total		15	2	—		5	1	3	0	7	1	0	0	30	4
Nacional (loan)	2016–17	Primeira Liga	22	1	—		0	0	1	0	—		—		23	1
Nottingham Forest (loan)	2017–18	Championship	12	0	—		0	0	0	0	—		—		12	0
Nottingham Forest	2018–19	Championship	13	0	—		0	0	1	0	—		—		14	0
Nottingham Forest	2019–20	Championship	30	3	—		1	0	3	0	—		—		34	3
Nottingham Forest	2020–21	Championship	32	0	—		1	0	1	0	—		—		34	0
Nottingham Forest	2021–22	Championship	26	0	—		1	0	1	0	—		—		28	0
Nottingham Forest	Total		113	3	—		3	0	6	0	—		—		122	3
Hull City	2022–23	Championship	22	0	—		1	0	1	0	—		—		24	0
Fortaleza	2023	Série A	4	0	0	0	0	0	—		0	0	0	0	4	0
Fortaleza	2024	Série A	0	0	0	0	0	0	—		0	0	0	0	0	0
Fortaleza	2025	Série A	0	0	0	0	0	0	—		0	0	0	0	0	0
Fortaleza	Total		4	0	0	0	0	0	—		0	0	0	0	4	0
Criciúma (loan)	2024	Série A	25	1	4 (Note: Appearances in Campeonato Catarinense)	1	0	0	—		—		—		29	1
Athletico Paranaense (loan)	2025	Série B	4	0	5 (Note: Appearances in Campeonato Paranaense)	1	3	0	—		—		—		12	1
Career total			267	9	9	2	12	1	11	0	7	1	0	0	306	13

== Honours ==
Sporting CP

- Taça de Portugal: 2014–15
- Taça da Liga: 2017–18
- Supertaça Cândido de Oliveira: 2015

Nottingham Forest

- EFL Championship play-offs: 2022
