= Minhoca =

Portuguese footballer

Personal information
- Full name: Nélson Alexandre Farpelha Estrela
- Date of birth: 29 April 1988 (age 38)
- Place of birth: Ponta Delgada, Portugal
- Height: 1.75 m (5 ft 9 in)
- Position: Midfielder

Team information
- Current team: Santa Clara B

Youth career
- 1999–2004: Marítimo Ponta Delgada
- 2005: Oliveirenses
- 2005–2006: Marítimo Ponta Delgada

Senior career*
Years	Team	Apps	(Gls)
2006–2011	Micaelense	68	(14)
2011–2014	Santa Clara	80	(7)
2014–2017	Paços Ferreira	64	(2)
2017–2019	Santa Clara	37	(3)
2019–2020	Varzim	19	(0)
2020–2022	Torreense	25	(2)
2022–2024	Rabo de Peixe	41	(1)
2024–	Santa Clara B	5	(0)
- * Club domestic league appearances and goals as of 02:02, 12 March 2026 (UTC)

Nélson Alexandre Farpelha Estrela (born 29 April 1988), known as Minhoca, is a Portuguese footballer who plays as an attacking midfielder for Santa Clara B.

He achieved totals of 70 Primeira Liga games and two goals for Paços de Ferreira and Santa Clara, while adding 130 appearances and ten goals in the second tier for Santa Clara and Varzim.

== Club career ==
Born in Ponta Delgada, Azores, Minhoca earned his nickname meaning "earthworm" in his native language for his dribbling ability while a youth player at Marítimo Sport Clube in his hometown. He began his senior career with CU Micaelense in the fourth division and, in June 2011, he signed a three-year deal with C.D. Santa Clara of the Segunda Liga, again in his native islands.

In January 2014, Primeira Liga club F.C. Paços de Ferreira secured Minhoca on a 3 1/2-year contract. He scored his first goal on 21 May as a substitute confirming a 3–1 home win against C.D. Aves in the promotion/relegation play-off.

On 23 November 2014, Minhoca netted twice in a 9–0 rout of amateurs Clube Atlético Riachense in the fourth round of the Taça de Portugal. On 13 December, he was sent off before half-time of the 2–1 victory over F.C. Arouca at the Estádio da Mata Real. His first top-flight goal was on 17 April 2016, in a 4–3 away defeat of C.F. União.

Minhoca returned to Santa Clara in May 2017, on a two-year deal. In his first season in his second spell, he contributed three goals as they were promoted as runners-up to C.D. Nacional. On 17 September he received a straight red card after half an hour in a 2–1 victory at Gil Vicente FC.

In July 2019, released by Santa Clara, Minhoca agreed to a one-year contract at Varzim S.C. in division two. At its conclusion, he dropped down to the third tier and joined S.C.U. Torreense. After winning promotion to Liga 3, he signed for another season in Torres Vedras in July 2021.
