= Hugo Grilo =

Portuguese footballer

Personal information
- Full name: Hugo Miguel Grilo Francisco
- Date of birth: 28 July 1986 (age 40)
- Place of birth: Odivelas, Portugal
- Height: 1.82 m (5 ft 11 1/2 in)
- Position: Defender

Team information
- Current team: Oriental
- Number: 44

Youth career
- 1994–2002: CER Tenente Valdez
- 2002–2004: Benfica

Senior career*
Years	Team	Apps	(Gls)
2004–2005	Benfica B		
2005–2011	Operário	144	(11)
2011–	Oriental	91	(7)

International career^{‡}
2005	Portugal U19	2	(0)
- * Club domestic league appearances and goals as of 09:37, 12 August 2014 (UTC) ‡ National team caps and goals as of 2 June 2013

Hugo Miguel Grilo Francisco (born 28 July 1986), simply known as Hugo Grilo, is a Portuguese footballer who plays for Oriental as a defender.

== Club career ==
A product of Benfica's youth academy, he failed to break into the first team. Instead he had to be contended with a small stint with Benfica B between 2004 and 2005. After being released by the club he joined Operário in 2005. Though he struggled in his first season, he established himself as a first team starter in 2006. He made more than 25 appearances in each of the following seasons till 2011, when he left the club.

In 2011, he joined Oriental. He made 28 appearances in his first season with the club.
