= Kelvin Medina =

Cape Verdean footballer

Zimbabwe
Personal information
- Full name: Kelvin Monteiro Medina
- Date of birth: 3 January 1994 (age 32)
- Place of birth: Mindelo, Cape Verde
- Height: 1.74 m (5 ft 9 in)
- Position: Midfielder

Team information
- Current team: Sporting da Covilhã
- Number: 80

Youth career
- 2012–2013: AD Oeira

Senior career*
Years	Team	Apps	(Gls)
2013–2014	AD Oeira	15	(2)
2014–2015	AC Alcanense	12	(1)
2015–2017	Sertanense	64	(4)
2017–2019	Mirandela	46	(10)
2019	Vilafranquense	14	(2)
2019–2021	Académico Viseu	51	(0)
2021–2022	Rio Ave	8	(0)
2022–2023	Vilafranquense	8	(1)
2023–	Sporting da Covilhã	17	(0)

International career^{‡}
2018–	Cape Verde	1	(0)
- * Club domestic league appearances and goals as of 7 July 2018 ‡ National team caps and goals as of 26 June 2023

Kelvin Monteiro Medina, known as Zimbabwe (born 3 January 1994), is a Cape Verdean professional footballer who plays as a midfielder for the Portuguese club Sporting da Covilhã.

== Club career ==
On 2 July 2021, he signed a contract with Rio Ave for a term of one year with two optional years.

== International career ==
Medina made his debut for the Cape Verde national football team in a 0-0 (4-3) penalty shootout win over Andorra on 3 June 2018.
