= Pedro Alves (footballer, born 1983) =

Portuguese footballer

Personal information
- Full name: Pedro Rafael Félix Alves
- Date of birth: 27 May 1983 (age 43)
- Place of birth: Lisbon, Portugal
- Height: 1.71 m (5 ft 7 in)
- Positions: Midfielder; winger

Youth career
- 1993–1994: Vitória Lisboa
- 1994–1995: Olivais Moscavide
- 1995–1996: Sporting CP
- 1996–1997: Mem Martins
- 1997–1998: Estrela Amadora
- 1998: Louletano
- 1998–2000: Torres Novas
- 2000–2002: Louletano

Senior career*
Years	Team	Apps	(Gls)
2002–2003	Louletano	26	(1)
2003–2004	Oriental	32	(4)
2004	Pinhalnovense	12	(1)
2005	Estrela Vendas Novas	16	(0)
2005–2006	Operário	12	(1)
2006–2007	Carregado		
2007–2009	Sintrense	26	(6)
2009–2011	Pinhalnovense	50	(5)
2011–2012	Torreense	27	(2)
2012–2013	Aris Limassol	24	(8)
2013–2015	Oriental	56	(5)
Total		281	(33)

Managerial career
- 2015–2018: Braga (scout)
- 2018–2023: Estoril (sporting director)
- 2023–2024: Olympiacos (sporting director)
- * Club domestic league appearances and goals

Pedro Rafael Félix Alves (born 27 May 1983 in Lisbon) is a Portuguese former professional footballer who played as a midfielder or winger. He worked recently as a sporting director for Super League Greece club Olympiacos.
