= Hugo Santos (footballer, born 1983) =

Portuguese footballer

Personal information
- Full name: Hugo Eduardo Carvalho Ferreira dos Santos
- Date of birth: 17 January 1983 (age 43)
- Place of birth: Lisbon, Portugal
- Height: 1.82 m (6 ft 0 in)
- Positions: Winger; midfielder

Team information
- Current team: Operário Lagoa
- Number: 10

Youth career
- 1995–2002: Olivais e Moscavide

Senior career*
Years	Team	Apps	(Gls)
2002–2003	Olivais e Moscavide		
2003–2007	Operário Lagoa		
2007–2009	Naval		
2008–2009	→ Portimonense (loan)	24	(2)
2009–2010	Operário Lagoa		
2010–2011	União da Madeira		
2011–2012	Naval	25	(5)
2012–2014	Santa Clara	48	(11)
2014–2015	Chaves	35	(1)
2015–2017	Santa Clara	56	(4)
2017	Praiense	4	(2)
2017–2019	SC Ideal	45	(4)
2019	GD São Roque	10	(2)
2019–	Operário Lagoa	9	(2)
- * Club domestic league appearances and goals as of 13:13, 11 April 2020 (UTC)

Hugo Eduardo Carvalho Ferreira dos Santos (born 17 January 1983) is a Portuguese footballer who plays as a winger and midfielder who plays for Operário Lagoa.

== Career ==
Santos made his professional debut in the Segunda Liga for Portimonense on 24 August 2008 in a game against Varzim.
