= Cristiano Pascoal =

Portuguese footballer (born 1992)

Personal information
- Full name: Cristiano Filipe Marques Pascoal
- Date of birth: 8 June 1992 (age 34)
- Place of birth: Coimbra, Portugal
- Height: 1.86 m (6 ft 1 in)
- Position: Centre-back

Team information
- Current team: US Esch
- Number: 5

Youth career
- 2002–2007: Marialvas
- 2007–2008: Tourizense
- 2008–2011: Académica

Senior career*
Years	Team	Apps	(Gls)
2011–2013	Tourizense	59	(1)
2013–2015	Operário	48	(4)
2015–2016	Benfica Castelo Branco	25	(1)
2016	Santa Clara	1	(0)
2016–2019	Praiense	59	(1)
2019–	US Esch	8	(2)
- * Club domestic league appearances and goals as of 22:34, 21 October 2019 (UTC)

Cristiano Filipe Marques Pascoal (born 8 June 1992) is a Portuguese footballer who plays for US Esch as a centre-back.

== Career ==
On 26 October 2016, Pascoal made his professional debut with Santa Clara in a 2016–17 Taça da Liga match against Vitória Setúbal.
