= Diogo Torres =

Portuguese footballer

Personal information
- Full name: Diogo Alberto Carvalho Torres
- Date of birth: 22 April 1987 (age 39)
- Place of birth: Maia, Portugal
- Height: 1.71 m (5 ft 7 in)
- Position: Forward

Team information
- Current team: Merelinense
- Number: 27

Youth career
- 1999–2000: Coimbrões
- 2000–2001: Ermesinde
- 2001–2006: Maia

Senior career*
Years	Team	Apps	(Gls)
2005–2007	Maia	18	(0)
2007–2008	Pedras Rubras		
2008–2009	Gondomar	15	(0)
2009–2010	Lusitânia Lourosa	23	(10)
2010	Aliados Lordelo	12	(1)
2011	Tondela	17	(3)
2011–2013	Cinfães	49	(14)
2013–2014	Tirsense	28	(1)
2014–2015	Famalicão	22	(2)
2015–2016	US Lusitanos	21	(2)
2016	Famalicão	0	(0)
2017	Merelinense	31	(4)
2017	Felfueiras	12	(1)
2018	Aliança de Gandra	14	(1)
2018–	Merelinense	51	(5)
- * Club domestic league appearances and goals as of 20:04, 25 January 2021 (UTC)

Diogo Alberto Carvalho Torres (born 22 April 1987) is a Portuguese footballer who plays as a forward for Merelinense.

== Career ==
Torres made his professional debut in the Segunda Liga for Maia on 17 December 2005 in a game against Portimonense.
