= Nuninho =

Portuguese footballer

Personal information
- Full name: Nuno Filipe Ribeiro Teixeira
- Date of birth: 28 February 1998 (age 28)
- Place of birth: Pevidém, Portugal
- Height: 1.66 m (5 ft 5 in)
- Position: Forward

Team information
- Current team: Trofense
- Number: 89

Youth career
- 2006–2007: Moreirense
- 2007–2010: Vizela
- 2010–2013: Sporting
- 2013–2017: Vitória Guimarães

Senior career*
Years	Team	Apps	(Gls)
2017–2018	Salgueiros	20	(1)
2018–2020	Vitória Guimarães B	22	(6)
2020–2021	Felgueiras	22	(3)
2021–2022	União de Leiria	38	(8)
2023	Felgueiras	14	(2)
2023–2024	Lusitânia	19	(4)
2024–	Trofense	53	(5)
- * Club domestic league appearances and goals as of 7 May 2026

Nuno Filipe Ribeiro Teixeira (born 28 February 1998) known as Nuninho, is a Portuguese professional footballer who plays for Trofense as a forward.

== Club career ==
On 7 October 2018, Nuninho made his professional debut with Vitória Guimarães B in a 2018–19 LigaPro match against Varzim.
