= Pedro Cervantes (footballer) =

Portuguese footballer

Personal information
- Full name: Pedro Nuno Coelho Cervantes
- Date of birth: 13 July 1981 (age 45)
- Place of birth: Porto, Portugal
- Height: 1.75 m (5 ft 9 in)
- Position: Midfielder

Youth career
- 1991–1992: Boavista
- 1996–2000: Leça

Senior career*
Years	Team	Apps	(Gls)
2000–2002	Leça	29	(0)
2002–2003	Ovarense	34	(4)
2003–2005	Naval	41	(3)
2005–2008	Leixões	76	(11)
2008–2010	União Leiria	32	(2)
2010–2012	Aves	44	(0)
2012–2014	Santa Clara	68	(1)
2014–2016	Varzim	28	(2)
2015–2016	Varzim B	11	(1)
2016–2017	Pedras Rubras	23	(0)
Total		386	(24)
- * Club domestic league appearances and goals

Pedro Nuno Coelho Cervantes (born 13 July 1981) is a Portuguese former footballer who played as a midfielder.

== Club career ==
Born in Porto, Cervantes amassed Segunda Liga totals of 299 games and 21 goals over 13 seasons, representing Leça FC, A.D. Ovarense, Associação Naval 1º de Maio, Leixões SC, U.D. Leiria, C.D. Aves, C.D. Santa Clara and Varzim SC. He made his debut in the competition whilst at the service of the first club, playing 59 minutes in a 2–0 away win against Naval on 18 March 2001.

Cervantes' input in the Primeira Liga consisted of 32 matches, 21 with Leixões in the 2007–08 campaign and 11 with Leiria in 2009–10. His maiden appearance in the competition took place on 18 August 2007, when he started for the former in a 1–1 home draw with S.L. Benfica.
