= Sport Clube Salgueiros =

Salgueiros
- Full name: Sport Clube Salgueiros
- Short name: Salgueiros
- Founded: 2008
- Ground: Estádio do Padroense FC; Padrão da Légua, Portugal
- Capacity: 3,000
- League: Campeonato de Portugal
- 2015–16: 1st, Série C – Relegation
Home colours	Away colours

Sport Clube Salgueiros, commonly known as simply Salgueiros, was a Portuguese club from the city of Porto, in the northern region of the country. It was founded in 2008, to fill the void left by Sport Comércio e Salgueiros collapse, returning to its original name in 2016.

== History ==
After S.C. Salgueiros was prevented from competing due to severe financial issues, Sport Clube Salgueiros 08 was created in 2008. The emblem had to be different, but it kept the reference to Salgueiros, as well as red as the dominant color. The re-founded club's debut was in the 2nd District Division of the Porto F.A.

Salgueiros 08 had a trajectory primarily in Porto's district divisions, but in the 2011–12 season, it achieved promotion to the National 3rd Division. A year later, the club was promoted to the Campeonato Nacional de Seniores – the third tier of the Portuguese football pyramid at that time. It remained there for the following season fightiing for promotion in 2013–14, before turning Sport Clube Salgueiros for the 2015–16 season, with a crest similar to the original of S.C. Salgueiros.

That was the final season of the phoenix club. In 2016–17, it got back the name, flag, history and crest of Sport Comércio e Salgueiros. To do so, the purchase of the identity elements was negotiated with the bankruptcy administrator.

Without its own stadium after the demolition of Estádio Vidal Pinheiro, Salgueiros 08/S.C. Salgueiros played most frequently at the Estádio do Padroense FC, in Padrão da Légua.

== Seasons ==
Season	Level	Division	Section	Place	Movements
2008–09	Tier 7	Regional	AF Porto – 2nd Division	1st	Promoted
2009–10	Tier 6	Regional	AF Porto – 1st Division	2nd	Promoted
2010–11	Tier 5	Regional	AF Porto – Honour Division	7th	
2011–12	Tier 5	Regional	AF Porto – Honour Division	2nd	Promoted
2012–13	Tier 4	Terceira Divisão	Serie C – 1st Phase	2nd	
2012–13	Tier 4	Terceira Divisão	Serie C – Promotion	2nd	Promoted
2013–14	Tier 3	Campeonato Nacional	Serie C – 1st Phase	5th	
2013–14	Tier 3	Campeonato Nacional	Serie C – Relegation	1st	
2014–15	Tier 3	Campeonato Nacional	Serie C – 1st Phase	1st	
2014–15	Tier 3	Campeonato Nacional	North Zone – Promotion	6th	
2015–16	Tier 3	Campeonato de Portugal	Serie C – 1st Phase	3rd	
2015–16	Tier 3	Campeonato de Portugal	Serie C – Relegation	1st	

* As Salgueiros 08 until 2014–15 season.

== Honours ==
=== Regional competitions ===
- Porto FA Second Division (Note: The Porto FA Second Division was the second tier league from its creation in 1921–22 until the introduction of the Honor Division in 1992–93. It then became the third tier league in the Porto FA. It's now the fourth tier league after the creation of the Elite Division in 2013–14.)
  - Winners: 2008–09
