= Tito (footballer, born 1980) =

Portuguese footballer

Personal information
- Full name: Bruno Miguel Areias de Sousa
- Date of birth: 19 November 1980 (age 45)
- Place of birth: Póvoa de Varzim, Portugal
- Height: 1.75 m (5 ft 9 in)
- Position: Defensive midfielder

Youth career
- 1991–1999: Varzim

Senior career*
Years	Team	Apps	(Gls)
1999–2001	Bougadense		
2001–2003	Marinhas		
2003–2004	Famalicão		
2004–2011	Varzim	192	(2)
2011–2015	Aves	132	(2)
2015–2016	Tirsense	31	(1)
2016–2017	Ninense		
Total		355	(5)
- * Club domestic league appearances and goals

Bruno Miguel Areias de Sousa (born 19 November 1980 in Póvoa de Varzim), known as Tito, is a Portuguese former professional footballer who played as a defensive midfielder.
