= Silvestre Pinheiro =

Portuguese footballer (born 1984)

Silvestre
Personal information
- Full name: Silvestre João Freitas Pinheiro
- Date of birth: 17 February 1984 (age 42)
- Place of birth: Brito, Portugal
- Height: 1.75 m (5 ft 9 in)
- Position: Defender

Team information
- Current team: Fafe
- Number: 8

Youth career
- 1997–2003: Caç. Taipas

Senior career*
Years	Team	Apps	(Gls)
2003–2004	Caç. Taipas		
2004–2005	União de Leiria		
2005–2007	Tourizense		
2007–2008	Pampilhosa		
2008	Moreirense		
2009	Tourizense		
2009–2011	Fafe		
2011–2012	União da Madeira	4	(0)
2012–	Fafe	119	(22)
- * Club domestic league appearances and goals as of 19 March 2017

Silvestre João Freitas Pinheiro, known as Silvestre (born 17 February 1984) is a Portuguese football player who plays for Fafe.

== Club career ==
He made his professional debut in the Segunda Liga for União da Madeira on 23 October 2011 in a game against Belenenses.
