= João Peixoto =

Brazilian politician (1945–2020)

João Alves Peixoto (Campos dos Goytacazes, 16 February 1945 — Campos dos Goytacazes, 30 September 2020) was a Brazilian politician.

== Biography ==
Married and father of three children, Peixoto served as municipal secretary of Agriculture and councilor in his hometown, Campos dos Goytacazes, also chairing the Chamber's Works Commission. President of the Drivers' Union, he was a state deputy in Rio de Janeiro for the Christian Democracy (DC), for six terms, during which time he became president of the Committee on Agriculture, Livestock and Rural Policies, Agriculture and Fisheries of the Legislative Assembly of the State of Rio de Janeiro (ALERJ).

He was one of the parliamentarians to vote in favor of the appointment of Domingos Brazão to the Court of Auditors of the State of Rio de Janeiro, which was highly criticized at the time. He was one of 41 state deputies to vote in favor of the privatization of CEDAE. He voted for the revocation of detention for the deputies Jorge Picciani, Paulo Melo and Edson Albertassi, accused of integrating a criminal scheme that counted on the participation of public agents from the Executive and Legislative branches, including the Court of Auditors, and important businessmen in the civil construction and transportation sectors.

Peixoto died on 30 September 2020, in a hospital in Campos dos Goytacazes, of COVID-19 complications during the pandemic in Brazil.
