= Rafinha (footballer, born 2006) =

Brazilian footballer

Personal information
- Full name: Rafael Lima da Silva
- Date of birth: 17 April 2006 (age 20)
- Place of birth: Natal, Brazil
- Height: 1.80 m (5 ft 11 in)
- Positions: Centre-back; left-back

Team information
- Current team: Sport Recife
- Number: 53

Youth career
- 2022: Atlético Mineiro
- 2023: ABC
- 2024–: Sport Recife

Senior career*
Years	Team	Apps	(Gls)
2025–	Sport Recife	4	(0)
- * Club domestic league appearances and goals as of 14:39, 9 December 2025 (UTC)

Rafael Lima da Silva (born 17 April 2006), commonly known as Rafinha, is a Brazilian professional footballer who plays as either a centre-back or a left-back for Sport Recife.

== Career ==
Born in Natal, Rio Grande do Norte, Rafinha joined the youth categories of Sport Recife in 2023, from ABC. On 5 December 2024, he renewed his contract until 2027.

Rafinha made his first team debut on 11 January 2025, starting in a 1–1 Campeonato Pernambucano away draw against Afogados, as the club fielded an under-20 squad. Promoted to the main squad by head coach Daniel Paulista in July 2025, he made his Série A debut on 7 December, coming on as a half-time substitute for Luan Cândido in a 4–0 home loss to Grêmio, as the club was already relegated.

== Career statistics ==
As of 9 December 2025

Appearances and goals by club, season and competition
Club	Season	League			State League (Note: Includes Campeonato Pernambucano)		Cup (Note: Includes Copa do Brasil)		Other		Total	
Club	Season	Division	Apps	Goals	Apps	Goals	Apps	Goals	Apps	Goals	Apps	Goals
Sport Recife	2025	Série A	1	0	3	0	0	0	0	0	4	0
Career total			1	0	3	0	0	0	0	0	4	0
