= Hélder Rodrigues =

Portuguese footballer

Personal information
- Full name: Hélder Figueiredo Rodrigues
- Date of birth: 6 October 1989 (age 37)
- Place of birth: Canas de Senhorim, Nelas, Portugal
- Height: 1.72 m (5 ft 8 in)
- Position: Forward

Team information
- Current team: Lusitano FCV

Youth career
- 2001–2009: Canas de Senhorim

Senior career*
Years	Team	Apps	(Gls)
2009–2010	Penalva do Castelo	32	(10)
2010–2012	Covilhã	12	(0)
2012–2013	Académico de Viseu	32	(12)
2013–2015	Feirense	41	(3)
2015–	Lusitano FCV	168	(54)
- * Club domestic league appearances and goals ‡ National team caps and goals as of 6 September 2021

Hélder Figueiredo Rodrigues (born 6 October 1989) is a Portuguese footballer who plays for Lusitano FCV as a forward.
