= Carlos Mané =

Bissau-Guinean footballer

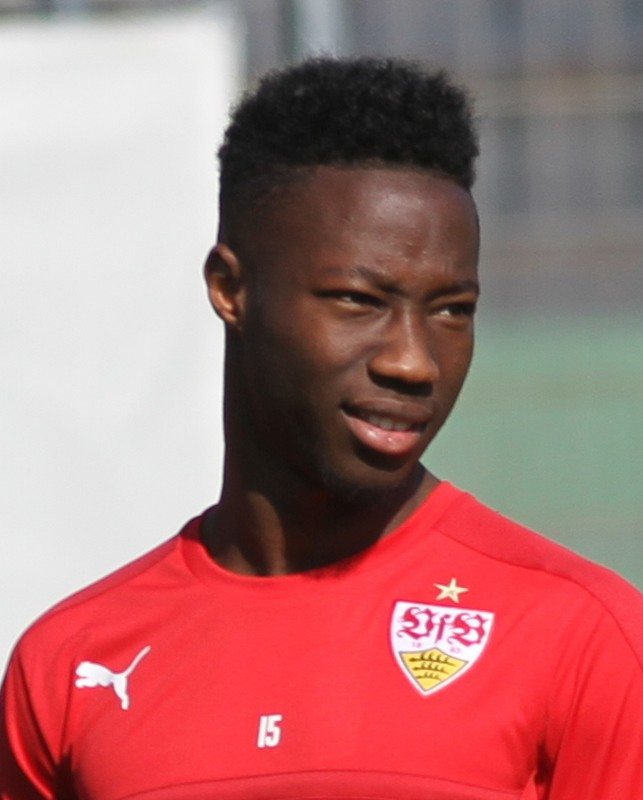
- Mané with VfB Stuttgart in 2016

Personal information
- Full name: Carlos Manuel Cardoso Mané
- Date of birth: 11 March 1994 (age 32)
- Place of birth: Lisbon, Portugal
- Height: 1.73 m (5 ft 8 in)
- Positions: Winger; forward

Youth career
- 2003–2013: Sporting CP

Senior career*
Years	Team	Apps	(Gls)
2012–2014	Sporting CP B	15	(1)
2013–2019	Sporting CP	62	(9)
2016–2018	→ VfB Stuttgart (loan)	19	(6)
2019	→ Union Berlin (loan)	8	(0)
2019–2021	Rio Ave	64	(7)
2021–2026	Kayserispor	131	(14)

International career^{‡}
2009	Portugal U15	2	(0)
2009–2010	Portugal U16	11	(4)
2010–2011	Portugal U17	15	(1)
2011–2012	Portugal U18	7	(2)
2012–2013	Portugal U19	17	(4)
2014–2017	Portugal U21	18	(5)
2016	Portugal U23	3	(0)
2023–	Guinea-Bissau	12	(2)
Medal record
Men's football
Representing Portugal
UEFA European Under-21 Championship
Runner-up	2015 Czech Republic
- * Club domestic league appearances and goals as of 20:58, 28 May 2026 (UTC) ‡ National team caps and goals as of 20:58, 28 May 2026 (UTC)

Carlos Manuel Cardoso Mané (born 11 March 1994) is a professional footballer who plays mainly as a right winger.

He began his career at Sporting CP, playing 92 competitive games and scoring 14 goals while winning four cup trophies. During loans at VfB Stuttgart and 1. FC Union Berlin, he won promotion from the 2. Bundesliga both times. Having signed in August 2021 from Rio Ave, he subsequently spent five seasons in the Turkish Süper Lig with Kayserispor.

Mané earned 73 caps for Portugal and scored 16 times across all youth levels, including representing the country at the 2016 Olympics. In September 2023, he switched allegiance to the Guinea-Bissau national team.

== Club career ==
=== Sporting CP ===
Born in Lisbon to Bissau-Guinean parents, Mané joined local Sporting CP at age 9. On 9 December 2012, he made his senior debut, appearing with the B team in a Segunda Liga match against C.D. Aves after coming on as a substitute for Jorge Chula in the 78th minute of a 2–2 home draw. Exactly one month later, in the same competition, he scored his first professional goal, at C.F. Os Belenenses (2–1 loss).

Mané played his first match in the Primeira Liga with the Lions on 5 October 2013, entering the pitch in the dying minutes of a 4–0 home win over Vitória de Setúbal. His first goal in the competition arrived on 15 February of the following year, when he started and scored in the 1–0 defeat of S.C. Olhanense also at the Estádio José Alvalade.

Mané scored his first goal in the UEFA Champions League in only his third appearance in the competition, opening an eventual 3–1 group stage home victory over NK Maribor on 25 November 2014 where he started and played 65 minutes. He played six games of the team's victorious run in the Taça de Portugal, netting the winner against F.C. Vizela in the fifth round and the equaliser away to C.D. Nacional in the first leg of the semi-final.

On 31 August 2016, Mané was loaned out to VfB Stuttgart until June 2018, with the German club having an option to buy. In his first match, he scored twice in the opening four minutes to help to a 4–0 home win over SpVgg Greuther Fürth, a new record for a debuting player in the German professional leagues. However, his overall stint at the Mercedes-Benz Arena was largely undermined by injury.

Mané returned to the German 2. Bundesliga in January 2019, joining 1. FC Union Berlin on loan until June with the option to make the move permanent. Hampered by a series of minor physical problems, he played eight games as the team from the capital were promoted to the Bundesliga for the first time, and they did not exercise the option.

=== Rio Ave ===
On 20 July 2019, Mané ended his 16-year association with Sporting by signing a three-year deal with Rio Ave F.C. of the same league, being presented at half-time in a pre-season friendly. He made his debut on 3 August in a 6–1 home rout of U.D. Oliveirense in the first round of the Taça da Liga, as a 46th-minute substitute for Gabrielzinho. On 21 November, also at the Estádio dos Arcos, he scored his first goal for the club, the only one against Vitória de Setúbal.

In his second season in Vila do Conde, Mané was his team's top scorer with six goals, including a late winner to avoid instant relegation on the last day at the expense of C.D. Nacional. Nonetheless, they went down following a playoff defeat by F.C. Arouca.

=== Kayserispor ===
On 13 August 2021, Mané joined Turkish club Kayserispor for an undisclosed transfer fee.

== International career ==
=== Portugal ===
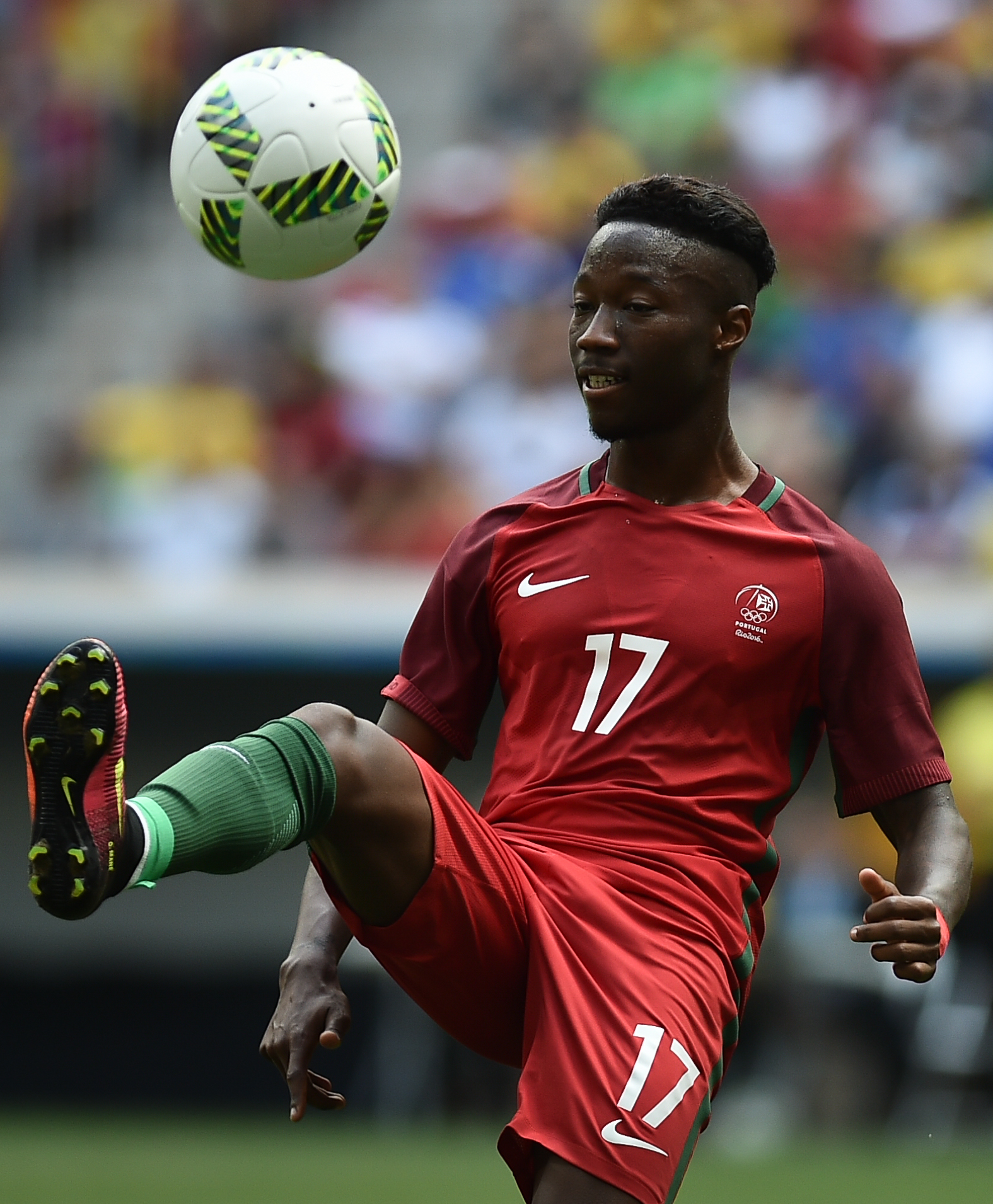
Mané playing for Portugal at the 2016 Olympics

Having already represented the Portugal national team at every level from under-15 onwards, Mané was part of the under-19 side that reached the semi-finals of the 2013 UEFA European Championship. During the tournament in Lithuania, he scored in a 4–2 victory over the hosts in the group stage.

Mané was also chosen in Rui Jorge's under-23 squad for the 2016 Olympics in Brazil, making two starts and a substitute appearance for the quarter-finalists.

=== Guinea-Bissau ===
On 6 September 2023, Mané was called up to the Guinea-Bissau national team for a set of 2023 Africa Cup of Nations qualification matches. He made his debut five days later, in a 2–1 win over Sierra Leone where he provided the assist to fellow debutant Nito Gomes' equaliser.

== Career statistics ==
=== Club ===
As of match played 25 May 2025

Appearances and goals by club, season and competition
Club	Season	League			National cup (Note: Includes Taça de Portugal, DFB Pokal and Turkish Cup)		League cup (Note: Includes Taça da Liga)		Continental		Other		Total	
Club	Season	Division	Apps	Goals	Apps	Goals	Apps	Goals	Apps	Goals	Apps	Goals	Apps	Goals
Sporting CP B	2012–13	Segunda Liga	6	1	—		—		—		—		6	1
Sporting CP B	2013–14	Segunda Liga	9	0	—		—		—		—		9	0
Sporting CP B	Total		15	1	—		—		—		—		15	1
Sporting CP	2013–14	Primeira Liga	18	2	1	0	2	2	—		—		21	4
Sporting CP	2014–15	Primeira Liga	29	6	6	2	0	0	6 (Note: Four appearances and one goal in UEFA Champions League, two appearances in UEFA Europa League)	1	—		41	9
Sporting CP	2015–16	Primeira Liga	11	1	0	0	2	0	8 (Note: Two appearances in UEFA Champions League, six appearances in UEFA Europa League)	0	1 (Note: Appearance in Supertaça Cândido de Oliveira)	0	22	1
Sporting CP	2016–17	Primeira Liga	2	0	0	0	0	0	0	0	—		2	0
Sporting CP	2017–18	Primeira Liga	0	0	0	0	0	0	0	0	—		0	0
Sporting CP	2018–19	Primeira Liga	2	0	0	0	1	0	3 (Note: Appearances in UEFA Europa League)	0	—		6	0
Sporting CP	Total		62	9	7	2	5	2	17	1	1	0	92	14
VfB Stuttgart (loan)	2016–17	2. Bundesliga	19	6	1	0	—		—		—		20	6
VfB Stuttgart (loan)	2017–18	Bundesliga	0	0	0	0	—		—		—		0	0
VfB Stuttgart (loan)	Total		19	6	1	0	—		—		—		20	6
Union Berlin (loan)	2018–19	2. Bundesliga	8	0	0	0	—		—		0	0	8	0
Rio Ave	2019–20	Primeira Liga	32	1	2	0	4	0	—		—		38	1
Rio Ave	2020–21	Primeira Liga	32	6	3	0	0	0	3	0	2 (Note: Appearances in Primeira Liga promotion/relegation play-offs)	0	40	6
Rio Ave	2021–22	Liga Portugal 2	0	0	0	0	2	0	—		—		2	0
Rio Ave	Total		64	7	5	0	6	0	3	0	2	0	80	7
Kayserispor	2021–22	Süper Lig	29	2	6	0	—		—		—		35	2
Kayserispor	2022–23	Süper Lig	25	4	5	0	—		—		—		30	4
Kayserispor	2023–24	Süper Lig	25	5	2	0	—		—		—		27	5
Kayserispor	2024–25	Süper Lig	30	3	0	0	—		—		—		30	3
Kayserispor	Total		109	14	13	0	—		—		—		122	14
Career total			277	37	26	2	11	2	20	1	3	0	337	42

=== International ===
As of match played 28 March 2026

Appearances and goals by national team and year
National team	Year	Apps	Goals
Guinea-Bissau	2023	2	0
Guinea-Bissau	2024	7	2
Guinea-Bissau	2025	2	0
Guinea-Bissau	2026	1	0
Total		12	2

Scores and results list Guinea-Bissau's goal tally first, score column indicates score after each Mané goal.

List of international goals scored by Carlos Mané
No.	Date	Venue	Opponent	Score	Result	Competition
1	6 January 2024	Stade du 26 Mars, Bamako, Mali	Mali	2–3	2–6	Friendly
2	15 November 2024	Mbombela Stadium, Mbombela, South Africa	Eswatini	1–1	1–1	2025 Africa Cup of Nations qualification

== Honours ==
Sporting CP

- Taça de Portugal: 2014–15, 2018–19
- Taça da Liga: 2018–19
- Supertaça Cândido de Oliveira: 2015

Portugal

- UEFA European Under-21 Championship runner-up: 2015
