= Nelsinho (footballer, born 1979) =

Portuguese footballer

Personal information
- Full name: Nélson Manuel Ribeiro da Silva
- Date of birth: 28 July 1979 (age 47)
- Place of birth: Felgueiras, Portugal
- Height: 1.70 m (5 ft 7 in)
- Position: Midfielder

Youth career
- 1989–1998: Vizela

Senior career*
Years	Team	Apps	(Gls)
1998–2002	Vizela	83	(9)
2002–2004	Fafe	70	(8)
2004–2005	Braga	0	(0)
2004–2005	Braga B	5	(1)
2005	→ Estrela Amadora (loan)	9	(1)
2005–2006	Fafe	19	(3)
2006–2007	Trofense	27	(2)
2007–2008	Gondomar	22	(1)
2008–2010	Varzim	55	(1)
2010–2011	Estoril	15	(1)
2011–2012	Varzim	42	(5)
2013	Ribeirão	28	(7)
2014–2019	Varzim	187	(25)
2019–2021	Leça	48	(4)
2021–2022	Salgueiros	22	(0)
2022–2024	Ribeirão	33	(6)
Total		665	(74)
- * Club domestic league appearances and goals

Nélson Manuel Ribeiro da Silva (born 28 July 1979), known as Nelsinho, is a Portuguese former professional footballer who played as a midfielder.

== Club career ==
Born in Felgueiras, Porto District, Nelsinho spent the better part of his career with Varzim S.C. since first arriving in 2008 from Gondomar SC. He went on to represent the club in both the second and third divisions, making 267 appearances in the former competition and retiring well in his 40s.

In late October 2018, 39-year-old Nelsinho suffered a knee injury during a league match against FC Porto B that sidelined him for two months. He returned to the lower leagues the following summer, joining Leça FC.
