= Mauro Bastos =

Portuguese footballer

Personal information
- Full name: Mauro Alexandre Rodrigues Sousa Carvalho Bastos
- Date of birth: 17 April 1979 (age 47)
- Place of birth: Lisbon, Portugal
- Height: 1.83 m (6 ft 0 in)
- Position: Striker

Team information
- Current team: Oțelul Galați (video analyst)

Youth career
- 1989–1994: Futsal
- 1994–1995: Ponte Frielas
- 1995–1998: Fanhões

Senior career*
Years	Team	Apps	(Gls)
1998–2000	Fanhões		
2000	Operário	8	(0)
2001–2002	Caldas	45	(20)
2002–2003	Schweinfurt 05	27	(3)
2003	Barreirense	20	(9)
2004–2005	Gil Vicente	12	(1)
2005–2006	Olivais Moscavide	28	(9)
2006–2007	Burgos	15	(3)
2007–2008	Mafra	25	(6)
2008–2009	Pinhalnovense	21	(4)
2009	Carregado	17	(5)
2010	Caála		
2010–2011	Fátima	22	(4)
2011	Chaves	10	(0)
2012	Tondela	17	(1)
2012	Sertanense	16	(8)
2013–2015	Oriental	78	(19)
2015–2016	Pinhalnovense	2	(1)
Total		363	(93)

Managerial career
- 2016: Pinhalnovense U19 (assistant)
- 2017: Pinhalnovense (assistant)
- 2018: América de Cali (assistant)
- 2019–2020: Loures U14
- 2020: Olímpico Montijo (assistant)
- 2021: Oriental (assistant)
- 2021: Oriental
- 2022: Cova Piedade (assistant)
- 2022–2023: Sacavenense
- 2024–2025: Oliveira Hospital (assistant)
- 2025–2026: Salgueiros
- 2026–: Oțelul Galați (video analyst)
- * Club domestic league appearances and goals

Mauro Alexandre Rodrigues Sousa Carvalho Bastos (born 17 April 1979) is a Portuguese former professional footballer who played as a striker, currently video analyst at Liga I club Oțelul Galați.

== Honours ==
=== Player ===
Olivais Moscavide

- Segunda Divisão: 2005–06
