= Tiago Martins (footballer, born 1987) =

Portuguese footballer

Personal information
- Full name: Tiago André Silva Martins
- Date of birth: 25 June 1987 (age 39)
- Place of birth: Guimarães, Portugal
- Height: 1.77 m (5 ft 10 in)
- Position: Midfielder

Team information
- Current team: Os Sandinenses
- Number: 14

Youth career
- 2004–2006: Moreirense

Senior career*
Years	Team	Apps	(Gls)
2006–2010	Moreirense		
2010–2012	Amarante		
2012–2013	Vizela	30	(3)
2013–2014	Sporting Covilhã	40	(0)
2014–2017	Vizela	57	(3)
2015	→ Trofense (loan)	18	(0)
2017–2018	Brito	21	(5)
2019–	Os Sandinenses	23	(5)
- * Club domestic league appearances and goals as of 17:02, 26 January 2021 (UTC)

Tiago André Silva Martins (born 25 June 1987) is a Portuguese football player who plays for Os Sandinenses.

== Club career ==
He made his professional debut in the Segunda Liga for Sporting Covilhã on 11 August 2013 in a game against Marítimo B.
