= Rafinha Cunha =

Portuguese footballer

Rafinha
Personal information
- Full name: Sandro Rafael Veiga Cunha
- Date of birth: 30 April 1992 (age 34)
- Place of birth: Paços de Ferreira, Portugal
- Height: 1.66 m (5 ft 5 in)
- Position: Winger

Team information
- Current team: Rebordosa
- Number: 21

Youth career
- 2008–2011: Paços de Ferreira

Senior career*
Years	Team	Apps	(Gls)
2011–2013	Paços de Ferreira	0	(0)
2011–2012	→ Ribeirão (loan)	12	(3)
2012–2013	→ Tirsense (loan)	30	(0)
2013–2014	Trofense	11	(0)
2014–2015	Vizela	18	(4)
2015–2016	Desportivo das Aves	21	(1)
2015–2016	→ Felgueiras 1932 (loan)	18	(0)
2016	Vizela	9	(0)
2016–2017	Amarante	28	(6)
2017–2019	Vitória Setúbal	3	(0)
2018–2019	→ Lusitânia (loan)	3	(1)
2019	→ Pedras Salgadas (loan)	13	(2)
2019	Louletano	7	(2)
2020–	Rebordosa	6	(1)
- * Club domestic league appearances and goals as of 21:09, 29 March 2020 (UTC)

Sandro Rafael Veiga Cunha (born 30 April 1992), known as Rafinha, is a Portuguese footballer who plays for Rebordosa as a winger.

== Career ==
On 27 July 2013, Rafinha made his professional debut with Trofense in a 2013–14 Taça da Liga match against União Madeira, when he started and played the full game. In the first match of the 2013–14 Segunda Liga season against Benfica B on 10 August, he replaced Paulo Monteiro (72nd minute) and made his league debut.
