= 2018–19 Taça de Portugal =

Taça de Portugal Placard

Tournament details
- Country: Portugal
- Dates: 8 September 2018 – 25 May 2019
- Teams: 144

Final positions
- Champions: Sporting CP (17th title)
- Runners-up: Porto

Tournament statistics
- Matches played: 167
- Goals scored: 529 (3.17 per match)
- Top goal scorer(s): Bruno Fernandes (7 goals)

The 2018–19 Taça de Portugal (also known as Taça de Portugal Placard for sponsorship reasons) was the 79th edition of the Taça de Portugal, the premier knockout competition in Portuguese football. The competition began with first-round matches on 8 September 2018 and concluded with the final on 25 May 2019.

This edition was contested by 144 clubs, including teams from the top three tiers of the Portuguese football league system (Note: Reserve or B teams are not eligible to participate.) and representatives of the fourth-tier District leagues and cups. This was the first season to allow a fourth substitution during extra time.

Primeira Liga side Desportivo das Aves were the defending champions, but they were eliminated by Braga in the quarter-finals.

== Format ==
Round	Clubs remaining	Clubs involved	Winners from previous round	New entries this round	Leagues entering at this round
First round	144	112	none	112	Campeonato de Portugal (3rd); District Football Associations (4th)
Second round	110	92	56+22	14	LigaPro (2nd)
Third round	64	64	46	18	Primeira Liga (1st)
Fourth round	32	32	32	none	none
Fifth round	16	16	16	none	none
Quarter-finals	8	8	8	none	none
Semi-finals	4	4	4	none	none
Final	2	2	2	none	none

== Teams ==
A total of 144 teams will compete in the 2018–19 Taça de Portugal: 18 teams from Primeira Liga, 14 teams from the LigaPro, 71 teams from the Campeonato de Portugal and 41 teams from the district championships. (Note: Reserve teams are not allowed to compete in cups. For this reason, Benfica B, Braga B, Porto B and Vitória de Guimarães B, who play in LigaPro, and Marítimo B, who play in Serie B of Campeonato de Portugal, do not compete in this tournament.)

=== Primeira Liga ===
- Belenenses SAD
- Benfica
- Boavista
- Braga
- Chaves
- Desportivo das Aves
- Feirense
- Marítimo
- Moreirense
- Nacional
- Portimonense
- Porto
- Rio Ave
- Santa Clara
- Sporting CP
- Tondela
- Vitória de Guimarães
- Vitória de Setúbal

=== LigaPro ===
- Académica
- Académico de Viseu
- Arouca
- Cova da Piedade
- Estoril
- Famalicão
- Farense
- Leixões
- Mafra
- Oliveirense
- Paços de Ferreira
- Penafiel
- Sp. Covilhã
- Varzim

=== Campeonato de Portugal ===
Series A

- AD Oliveirense
- Caçadores das Taipas
- Chaves Satélite
- Fafe
- Felgueiras 1932
- Gil Vicente
- Limianos
- Maria da Fonte
- Merelinense
- Mirandela
- Mirandês
- Montalegre
- Pedras Salgadas
- São Martinho
- Torcatense
- Trofense
- Vilaverdense
- Vizela

Series B

- Amarante
- Cesarense
- Cinfães
- Coimbrões
- Gafanha
- Gondomar
- Leça
- Lusitânia Lourosa
- Lusitano Vildemoinhos
- Paredes
- Pedras Rubras
- Penalva do Castelo
- Águeda
- Sanjoanense
- Sp. Espinho
- Sp. Mêda
- União da Madeira

Series C

- AD Nogueirense
- Alcains
- Alverca
- Anadia
- Benfica Castelo Branco
- Caldas
- Fátima
- Loures
- Mação
- Oleiros
- Oliveira do Hospital
- Peniche
- Santa Iria
- Sertanense
- Sintrense
- Torreense
- União de Leiria
- Vilafranquense

Series D

- 1.º Dezembro
- Amora
- Angrense
- Armacenenses
- Casa Pia
- Ferreiras
- Louletano
- Moura
- Olhanense
- Olímpico Montijo
- Oriental
- Pinhalnovense
- Praiense
- Real
- Redondense
- Sacavenense
- Sp. Ideal
- Vasco da Gama Vidigueira

=== District Championships ===
Algarve FA

- Silves (2nd)
- Almancilense (CW)

Angra do Heroísmo FA

- Graciosa
- Marítimo Graciosa

Aveiro FA

- Beira Mar (2nd)
- Pampilhosa (CR)

Beja FA

- Praia Milfontes (2nd)
- Mineiro Aljustrelense (CW)

Braga FA

- Vieira (3rd) (Note: The third placed team was qualified to the Taça de Portugal as two teams from Braga FA were promoted to Campeonato de Portugal.)
- Joane (CW)

Bragança FA

- Vila Flor (2nd)
- Vinhais (CW)

Castelo Branco FA

- Sernache (2nd)
- Idanhense (3rd)

Coimbra FA

- Clube Condeixa (2nd)
- Eirense (CR)

Évora FA

- Juventude Évora (2nd)
- Lusitano Évora (CW)

Guarda FA

- Trancoso (2nd)
- Gouveia (CW)

Horta FA

None

Leiria FA

- Amigos da Paz (2nd)
- Beneditense (CW)

Lisbon FA

- Lourinhanense (3rd) (Note: The third placed team was qualified to the Taça de Portugal as two teams from Lisbon FA were promoted to Campeonato de Portugal.)
- Coutada (CW)

Madeira FA

- Machico (2nd)

Ponta Delgada FA

- Rabo de Peixe
- Vale Formoso

Portalegre FA

- Gafetense (2nd)
- Portalegrense (CW)

Porto FA

- Valadares Gaia (3rd) (Note: The third placed team was qualified to the Taça de Portugal as two teams from Porto FA were promoted to Campeonato de Portugal.)
- Rio Tinto (CW)

Santarém FA

- União de Tomar (2nd)
- Torres Novas (3rd) (Note: The third placed team was qualified to the Taça de Portugal as the cup finalists were the first and second placed teams.)

Setúbal FA

- Barreirense (2nd)
- União Santiago (CR)

Viana do Castelo FA

- Vianense (2nd)
- Valenciano (CW)

Vila Real FA

- Régua (2nd)
- Vila Real (CW)

Viseu FA

- Sp. Lamego (1st) (Note: The first placed team was qualified to the Taça de Portugal as it refused the promotion for financial reasons, being the second placed team the one promoted.)
- Vila de Silgueiros (CW)

== Schedule ==
All draws are held at the FPF headquarters at Cidade do Futebol, in Oeiras. Match kick-off times are in WET (UTC±0) from the fourth round to the semi-finals, and in WEST (UTC+1) during the rest of the competition.

Round	Draw date	Date(s)	Fixtures	Teams	Prize money (Note: These values are for games without television transmission.)
First round	10 August 2018	8–9 September 2018	56	144 → 110	€3,000
Second round	11 September 2018	29–30 September 2018	46	110 → 64	€4,000
Third round	10 October 2018	18–21 October 2018	32	64 → 32	€5,000
Fourth round	26 October 2018	22, 24–25 November 2018	16	32 → 16	€6,000
Fifth round	30 November 2018	18–19 December 2018	8	16 → 8	€9,000
Quarter-finals	21 December 2019	15–17 January 2019	4	8 → 4	€12,000
Semi-finals	21 December 2019	5–7 February 2019 (1st leg); 2–4 April 2019 (2nd leg)	4	4 → 2	€17,500
Final	21 December 2019	25 May 2019	1	2 → 1	€150,000 (losing finalist) €300,000 (winner)

== First round ==
Times are WEST (UTC+1) (local times, if different, are in parentheses).

8 September 2018 Serie A	Limianos (CP)	4–0	(D) Valenciano	Ponte de Lima
17:00	Ricardo Silva 32'; Cláudio Dantas 45'; Francisco Cerqueira 55'; Imbeni 85'	Report		Stadium: Campo do Cruzeiro; Referee: José Rodrigues

9 September 2018 Serie A	Vianense (D)	0–1	(CP) Gil Vicente	Viana do Castelo
17:00		Report	Ahmed Isaiah 71'	Stadium: Estádio Dr. José de Matos; Referee: Hugo Pacheco

9 September 2018 Serie A	Vilaverdense (CP)	2–3	(CP) Caçadores das Taipas	Vila Verde
17:00	Pereira 13'; Aldair Ferreira 45'	Report	Carneiro 23', 64' (pen.); Miguel Pereira 90'	Stadium: Campo da Cruz do Reguengo; Referee: Bruno Costa

9 September 2018 Serie A	Maria da Fonte (CP)	4–0	(CP) Mirandês	Póvoa de Lanhoso
17:00	Telmo Fernandes 16'; Miguel Ribeiro 50'; João Marna 55', 71'	Report		Stadium: Estádio dos Moinhos Novos; Referee: Márcio Torres

9 September 2018 Serie A	Vinhais (D)	1–6	(CP) Chaves Satélite	Vinhais
17:00	Márcio Doreta 52'	Report	Nuno Fernandes 10' (o.g.); Gustavo Souza 27'; José Oliveira 75'; Marlon Almeida 82'; João Paredes 86' (pen.); Abdoul Zangre 87'	Stadium: Estádio Municipal de Vinhais; Referee: António Alves

9 September 2018 Serie A	Montalegre (CP)	2–3	(CP) Pedras Salgadas	Montalegre
17:00	Bonkat 38', 77'	Report	Luís Neves 26'; João Lima 71', 89'	Stadium: Campo Dr. Diogo Alves Vaz Pereira; Referee: Carlos Macedo

9 September 2018 Serie A	Merelinense (CP)	3–1	(D) Vieira	Merelim
17:00	Fábio Pimenta 42', 47'; Henrique Vieira 90'	Report	Rui Cruz 77'	Stadium: Estádio João Soares Vieira; Referee: Carlos Pizarro

9 September 2018 Serie B	Joane (D)	0–2	(CP) Fafe	Joane
17:00		Report	Nené 61' (pen.); Ferrinho 90'	Stadium: Estádio de Barreiros; Referee: Joel Vale

9 September 2018 Serie B	Trofense (CP)	1–0	(CP) Vizela	Trofa
17:00	Castanheira 26'	Report		Stadium: Estádio C.D. Trofense; Referee: Leonardo Marques

9 September 2018 Serie B	Amarante (CP)	6–0	(CP) AD Oliveirense	Amarante
17:00	Nélson Piquet 14'; Miguelito 18', 53'; Marquinhos 36'; Chukwunenye Ukachukwu 67'; André Fonseca 79'	Report		Stadium: Estádio Municipal de Amarante; Referee: André Castro

9 September 2018 Serie B	Vila Real (D)	2–1	(CP) Torcatense	Vila Real
17:00	Diogo Santos 46'; Eduardo Teixeira 49'	Report	Jussame Ribeiro 77'	Stadium: Complexo Desportivo do Monte da Forca; Referee: Pedro Viveiros

9 September 2018 Serie B	Pedras Rubras (CP)	1–2	(CP) Mirandela	Pedras Rubras
17:00	Nuno Pereira 25'	Report	Medina 38', 63'	Stadium: Estádio Municipal de Pedras Rubras; Referee: Bruno Nunes

9 September 2018 Serie B	São Martinho (CP)	6–1	(D) Machico	São Martinho do Campo
17:00	Pedro Rodrigues 21'; Nei 34', 55'; Costa 45', 83', 90'	Report	Hernâni 46'	Stadium: Estádio Comendador Abílio Ferreira de Oliveira; Referee: Albano Correia

9 September 2018 Serie B	Felgueiras 1932 (CP)	9–0	(D) Vila Flor	Felgueiras
17:00	Ayonfe Akinbule 17', 63', 71'; Digas 21', 30', 32', 36'; André Rodrigues 43', 75'	Report		Stadium: Estádio Municipal Dr. Machado Matos; Referee: Pedro Ferreira

9 September 2018 Serie C	Gondomar (CP)	2–0	(CP) Leça	Gondomar
17:00	Óscar Rojas 46'; Zé Pedro 82' (pen.)	Report		Stadium: Estádio de S. Miguel; Referee: Humberto Teixeira

9 September 2018 Serie C	Cesarense (CP)	1–0	(CP) Sp. Mêda	Oliveira de Azeméis
17:00	Adelcio Varela 39'	Report		Stadium: Estádio do Mergulhão; Referee: João Casegas Almeida

9 September 2018 Serie C	Cinfães (CP)	0–0 (a.e.t.) (4–5 p)	(CP) Sp. Espinho	Cinfães
17:00		Report		Stadium: Estádio Municipal Prof. Cerveira Pinto; Referee: Rui Silva

9 September 2018 Serie C	Coimbrões (CP)	0–2	(D) Rio Tinto	Santa Marinha
17:00		Report	Diogo Bonifácio 38'; Bruno Neves 63' (o.g.)	Stadium: Parque Silva Matos; Referee: João Pereira

9 September 2018 Serie C	União da Madeira (CP)	3–1 (a.e.t.)	(CP) Lusitânia Lourosa	Camacha
15:00	Viveiros 21'; Adelaja 96'; Vasconcelos 113'	Report	Castro 38'	Stadium: Complexo Desportivo do C.F. União; Referee: David Salvador

9 September 2018 Serie C	Valadares Gaia (D)	0–0 (a.e.t.) (4–2 p)	(CP) Paredes	Valadares
17:00		Report		Stadium: Complexo Desportivo de Valadares; Referee: Pedro Campos

9 September 2018 Serie C	Sp. Lamego (CP)	3–2 (a.e.t.)	(D) Régua	Lamego
17:00	Vítor Guedes 59'; Claudino Semedo 90'; José Pinto 104'	Report	Ivanísio Júnior 8'; Juslain Babele 57'	Stadium: Estádio dos Remédios; Referee: Marco Pereira

9 September 2018 Serie D	Águeda (CP)	2–1	(D) Trancoso	Águeda
17:00	Iafai Jancó 18'; Niang 29'		Bruno Fonseca 58'	Stadium: Estádio Municipal de Águeda; Referee: António Moreira

9 September 2018 Serie D	Anadia (CP)	3–1	(CP) Penalva do Castelo	Anadia
17:00	Michael dos Santos 4'; Santiago 25'; Santos 76'		Albert Kokora 53'	Stadium: Estádio Municipal Eng. Sílvio Henriques Cerveira

9 September 2018 Serie D	Pampilhosa (D)	0–0 (a.e.t.) (2–4 p)	(CP) Oliveira do Hospital	Pampilhosa, Aveiro
17:00				Stadium: Campo de Jogos Municipal Carlos Duarte; Referee: Fábio Piló

9 September 2018 Serie D	Lusitano Vildemoinhos (CP)	2–4	(D) Beira-Mar	Viseu
17:00	Diogo Braz 79'; Murilo Rosa 85' (pen.)		Bruno Henrique 2'; Letz 11'; Pedro Aparício 39'; Artur 43'	Stadium: Campo dos Trambelos

9 September 2018 Serie D	Vila de Silgueiros (D)	0–2	(CP) Gafanha	Mangualde
17:00			Diogo Tavares 36'; Bruno Fernandes 56'	Stadium: Estádio Municipal de Mangualde; Referee: Fábio Nunes

9 September 2018 Serie D	Eirense (D)	2–0	(D) Gouveia	Eiras, Coimbra
17:00	Carlos Lopes 49'; Bernardo Marques 84'			Stadium: Campo do Vale do Fôjo

9 September 2018 Serie D	Sanjoanense (CP)	2–0	(CP) AD Nogueirense	São João da Madeira
17:00	Martin Luther 86'; Rafa 90' (pen.)			Stadium: Estádio Conde Dias Garcia; Referee: Nélson Cunha

9 September 2018 Serie E	Benfica Castelo Branco (CP)	1–2	(CP) União de Leiria	Castelo Branco
17:00	Matos 85'		Antwi 15'; Vieira 18'	Stadium: Estádio Municipal Vale do Romeiro; Referee: Paulo Raposo

9 September 2018 Serie E	Oleiros (CP)	2–0	(CP) Fátima	Oleiros
17:00	Vilmar 18', 83'			Stadium: Municipal de Oleiros; Referee: Renato Gonçalves

9 September 2018 Serie E	Sertanense (CP)	2–0	(D) Beneditense	Sertã
17:00	Sócrates Pedro 18'; João Jesus 70'			Stadium: Campo de Jogos Dr. Marques dos Santos; Referee: Rui Mendes

9 September 2018 Serie E	Condeixa (D)	3–2	(CP) Mação	Condeixa-a-Nova
17:00	André Jorge 29'; Léo Teixeira 35'; Rui Pereira 90'		Sérgio Nogueira 13', 79' (pen.)	Stadium: Municipal de Condeixa-a-Nova; Referee: Daniel Cardoso

9 September 2018 Serie E	Vit. Sernache (D)	1–0	(CP) Alcains	Cernache do Bonjardim
17:00	Williams Júnior 43' (pen.)			Stadium: Municipal Nuno Álvares Pereira; Referee: Luís Máximo

9 September 2018 Serie E	Idanhense (D)	1–2	(D) União de Tomar	Idanha-a-Nova
17:00	Carlos Filipe 86'		Allan Peixoto 41'; João Pedro 56'	Stadium: Municipal de Idanha-a-Nova; Referee: Miguel Nogueira

9 September 2018 Serie E	Amigos da Paz (D)	2–0	(D) Torres Novas	Pousos, Leiria
17:00	Cedric Jorge 20'; Marques 30'			Stadium: Campo da Charneca; Referee: José Almeida

8 September 2018 Serie F	Sacavenense (CP)	2–1 (a.e.t.)	(CP) Alverca	Sacavém
17:00	Elvis Fernandes 80'; Simões 100'	Report	Elton Carvalho 70' (pen.)	Stadium: Campo do Sacavenense; Referee: Bruno Rebocho

9 September 2018 Serie F	1º de Dezembro (CP)	1–2	(CP) Sintrense	Sintra
17:00	Luisinho 90'		Filipe Pipas 31'; Pires 72' (pen.)	Stadium: Campo Conde de Sucena; Referee: Flávio Lima

9 September 2018 Serie F	Vilafranquense (CP)	0–0 (a.e.t.) (2–4 p)	(CP) Caldas	Vila Franca de Xira
17:00				Stadium: Campo do Cevadeiro; Referee: João Bernardo

9 September 2018 Serie F	Loures (CP)	6–1	(D) Portalegrense	Loures
17:00	Serginho 26', 49' (pen.), 54'; Jamil Rodríguez 32'; Ronan Rodrigues 66'; Liz 71'		Gonçalo Neves 65'	Stadium: Campo José da Silva Faria; Referee: Paulo Barradas

9 September 2018 Serie F	Torreense (CP)	2–0	(D) Coutada	Torres Vedras
17:00	Vaz 34'; Batalha 90'			Stadium: Estádio Manuel Marques; Referee: Gonçalo Nunes

9 September 2018 Serie F	Lourinhanense (D)	1–2	(CP) Peniche	Lourinhã
17:00	Flávio Santos 56'		Zílio 16' (pen.); Gonçalo Chaves 90+4'	Stadium: Municipal da Lourinhã; Referee: José Gorjão

9 September 2018 Serie F	Gafetense (D)	0–8	(CP) Santa Iria	Gáfete
17:00			João Costa 7', 90'; Vítor Hugo 27'; Flecha 58'; Hugo Ildefonso 64'; André Costa 74'; Bruno Santos 79' (pen.); Pedro Lobo 90+2'	Stadium: Municipal de Gáfete; Referee: João Mendes

8 September 2018 Serie G	Praiense (CP)	3–0	(D) Redondense	Praia da Vitória
12:00 (11:00 UTC±0)	Fonseca 45'; Cristiano Magina 65', 85'	Report		Stadium: Estádio Municipal da Praia da Vitória; Referee: Gonçalo Carreira

8 September 2018 Serie G	Pinhalnovense (CP)	5–0 (a.e.t.)	(D) Vale Formoso	Pinhal Novo
14:00	Tiago Feiteira 105'; Diego Zaporo 105', 119'; João Guilherme 112'; Ivan Reis 116'	Report		Stadium: Campo de Jogos Santos Jorge; Referee: Ricardo Baixinho

8 September 2018 Serie G	Rabo de Peixe (D)	0–0 (a.e.t.) (1–4 p)	(CP) Olímpico Montijo	Ribeira Grande
17:30 (16:30 UTC±0)		Report		Stadium: Estádio Municipal da Ribeira Grande; Referee: Diogo Pereira

8 September 2018 Serie G	Casa Pia (CP)	6–0	(D) Graciosa	Lisbon
17:00	Embaló 23', 51', 63'; Miguel Rodrigues 25'; Fonseca 40'; Roncatto 54' (pen.)	Report		Stadium: Estádio Pina Manique; Referee: Luís Reforço

8 September 2018 Serie G	Angrense (CP)	3–0	(D) Marítimo Graciosa	Angra do Heroísmo
18:00 (17:00 UTC±0)	Ivan Santos 55', 66'; Pedro Aguiar 86' (pen.)			Stadium: Municipal de Angra do Heróismo

9 September 2018 Serie G	Sp. Ideal (CP)	0–2	(CP) Real	Ribeira Grande
17:00 (16:00 UTC±0)			Gustavo Cazonatti 40'; Filipe Andrade 50'	Stadium: Municipal da Ribeira Grande; Referee: João Afonso

9 September 2018 Serie G	Oriental (CP)	3–1	(D) Barreirense	Lisbon
17:00	Nélson Landim 31'; Gomes 34'; Luís Lucas 64'		Rúben Guerreiro 22'	Stadium: Campo Engenheiro Carlos Salema; Referee: Rui Soares

== Second round ==
Number of teams per tier entering this round
Primeira Liga	LigaPro	Campeonato de Portugal	District FAs	Total
18 / 18	14 / 14	54 / 71	24 / 41	110 / 144

Repechage

The following 22 first-round losing teams were selected to compete in the second round:

- Alverca (CP)
- Beneditense (D)
- Coimbrões (CP)
- Fátima (CP)
- Joane (D)
- Leça (CP)
- Louletano (CP)
- Lourinhanense (D)
- Lusitano Vildemoinhos (CP)
- Mirandês (CP)
- Montalegre (CP)
- Paredes (CP)
- Praia Milfontes (D)
- Portalegrense (D)
- Sp. Ideal (CP)
- Torres Novas (D)
- União Santiago (D)
- Vale Formoso (D)
- Valenciano (D)
- Vila de Silgueiros (D)
- Vila Flor (D)
- Vilafranquense (CP)

Fixtures

Times are WEST (UTC+1) (local times, if different, are in parentheses).

29 September 2018	Gondomar (CP)	1–2	(II) Cova da Piedade	Gondomar
15:30	Óscar Rojas 79'		Rodrigo Martins 78'; Sori Mané 87'	Stadium: Estádio de São Miguel; Referee: Vítor Ferreira

29 September 2018	Leça (CP)	0–3	(II) Leixões	Leça da Palmeira
19:45			Pedro Henrique 2'; Kukula 85'; Erivaldo 90+3'	Stadium: Estádio do Leça FC; Referee: Cláudio Pereira

30 September 2018	Praiense (CP)	5–1	(CP) Pinhalnovense	Praia da Vitória
12:00 (11:00 UTC±0)	Danny Esteves 17', 35'; Dário 30', 43'; Breno 40'		Alain Pilar 48'	Stadium: Municipal da Praia da Vitória; Referee: José Almeida

30 September 2018	Anadia (CP)	3–1	(D) Mineiro Aljustrelense	Anadia
15:00	Mino 54', 63'; Santiago 76'		Pedro Seco 43'	Stadium: Estádio Municipal Engº Sílvio Henriques Cerveira; Referee: David Silva

30 September 2018	Merelinense (CP)	0–3	(CP) União da Madeira	Merelim
15:00			Luizinho 23', 30'; Aldair 86'	Stadium: Estádio João Soares Vieira; Referee: Sérgio Soares

30 September 2018	Eirense (D)	0–3	(CP) Torreense	Eiras, Coimbra
15:00 WEST (UTC+01:00)			Batalha 19', 82'; Bonifácio 90+1'	Stadium: Campo do Vale do Fôjo; Referee: André Castro

30 September 2018	Lusitano Évora (D)	1–3 (a.e.t.)	(CP) Oriental	Évora
15:00	Pedro Amendoeira 99'		Luís Lucas 94', 120'; Márcio Augusto 117'	Stadium: Complexo Desportivo do Lusitano; Referee: Hugo Silva

30 September 2018	Casa Pia (CP)	2–0	(CP) Olímpico Montijo	Lisbon
15:00	João Coito 30'; Gregório 52'			Stadium: Estádio Pina Manique; Referee: Fábio Piló

30 September 2018	Peniche (CP)	1–3	(CP) Montalegre	Peniche
15:00	Tiago Ferreira 76'		Ferrari 26'; Turé 63'; Anderson Zangão 69'	Stadium: Estádio do Peniche; Referee: Diogo Vicente

30 September 2018	Silves (D)	2–1	(CP) Paredes	Silves
15:00	Mica Duarte 46'; André Tonon 68' (pen.)		Shpitalny 78'	Stadium: Estádio Doutor Francisco Vieira; Referee: Paulo Barradas

30 September 2018	Santa Iria (CP)	3–1	(D) Lourinhanense	Santa Iria de Azoia, Loures
15:00	David Lourenço 45'; Maurício 84'; João Costa 87'		Rodrigo Pinto 42'	Stadium: Campo de Jogos Tomaz Reynolds; Referee: Miguel Nogueira

30 September 2018	Praia de Milfontes (D)	2–5	(D) Valenciano	Vila Nova de Milfontes
15:00	André Ribeiro 36', 41'		Bruno Moreira 14', 69'; Joel 31', 70'; Castro 56'	Stadium: Campo Foz do Mira; Referee: Nuno Alvo

30 September 2018	Oliveira do Hospital (CP)	1–1 (a.e.t.) (3–5 p)	(CP) Lusitano Vildemoinhos	Oliveira do Hospital
15:00	Trajceski 79'		Gonçalves 52'	Stadium: Municipal de Oliveira do Hospital; Referee: Luís Máximo

30 September 2018	Gil Vicente (CP)	0–1	(CP) Chaves Satélite	Barcelos
15:00			João Paredes 84' (pen.)	Stadium: Estádio Cidade de Barcelos; Referee: Fábio Nunes

30 September 2018	Amigos da Paz (D)	2–4	(D) União Santiago	Pousos, Leiria
15:00	Marques 55'; Cedric 65'		Ramião 7', 21', 23'; Vítor Reste 37'	Stadium: Campo da Charneca; Referee: Rui Mendes

30 September 2018	Mirandês (CP)	2–3	(CP) Coimbrões	Miranda do Douro
15:00	Amadi 45'; Litcha 58'		Mário Pereira 7'; Pedro Tavares 43'; Hélio 52'	Stadium: Estádio Municipal da Santa Luzia; Referee: Renato Gonçalves

30 September 2018	Felgueiras 1932 (CP)	2–0	(D) Joane	Felgueiras
15:00	Sunday 40' (pen.); André Rodrigues 69'			Stadium: Estádio Dr. Machado de Matos; Referee: Bruno Nunes

30 September 2018	Loures (CP)	1–0	(CP) Oleiros	Loures
15:00	Rodrigo Thompson 87'			Stadium: Campo José da Silva Faria; Referee: José Gorjão

30 September 2018	Valadares Gaia (D)	0–1	(CP) Louletano	Valadares
15:00			Marocas 81'	Stadium: Complexo Desportivo de Valadares; Referee: Daniel Cardoso

30 September 2018	Amora (CP)	8–0	(D) Sp. Lamego	Amora
15:00	Evanga Bienvenu 3', 44', 55'; Joca 22' (pen.); Ruben Fidalgo 42', 56', 81'; Tavares 84'			Stadium: Estádio da Medideira; Referee: Flávio Lima

30 September 2018	Real (CP)	0–0 (a.e.t.) (4–5 p)	(CP) Mirandela	Queluz
15:00				Stadium: Estádio do Real SC; Referee: David Salvador

30 September 2018	Sp. Espinho (CP)	0–0 (a.e.t.) (6–5 p)	(CP) Sintrense	Espinho
15:00				Stadium: Estádio Comendador Manuel Violas; Referee: Hugo Pacheco

30 September 2018	Torres Novas (D)	0–4	(CP) Maria da Fonte	Torres Novas
15:00			João Marna 44', 63'; Tanela 57'; Romário 76'	Stadium: Estádio Municipal Dr. Alves Vieira

30 September 2018	Beira-Mar (D)	0–1	(CP) São Martinho	Aveiro
15:00			Manuel Pedro 90'	Stadium: Estádio Mário Duarte; Referee: João Casegas Almeida

30 September 2018	Vila de Silgueiros (D)	0–2	(CP) Angrense	Viseu
15:00			Seidi 60'; Rodrigues 83'	Stadium: Estádio do Fontelo; Referee: José Laranjeira

30 September 2018	Rio Tinto (D)	1–4	(CP) Moura	Rio Tinto
15:00	Djaló 45'		Abreu 43', 90'; Leonardo Ceará 71'; Eduardo Nunes 90+2'	Stadium: Estádio Cidade de Rio Tinto; Referee: Duarte Oliveira

30 September 2018	Beneditense (D)	0–3	(CP) Armacenenses	Benedita
15:00			Wellington Júnior 31'; Bruno Torres 74'; Yaggo Gomes 90'	Stadium: Parque Jogos Fonte da Senhora; Referee: João Mendes

30 September 2018	Sacavenense (CP)	2–1	(II) Varzim	Sacavém
15:00	Joel Neves 8'; Iaquinta 18'		Haman 70'	Stadium: Campo do Sacavenense; Referee: Pedro Vilaça

30 September 2018	Condeixa (D)	1–3	(II) Paços de Ferreira	Condeixa-a-Nova
15:00	Rui Pereira 45'		Andrezinho 69' (pen.); Douglas Tanque 89'; Fatai 90+4'	Stadium: Municipal de Condeixa-a-Nova; Referee: João Pinho

30 September 2018	Cesarense (CP)	1–2 (a.e.t.)	(II) Sp. Covilhã	Cesar
15:00	Chapinha 15'		Onyeka 72'; Rick Sena 114'	Stadium: Estádio do Mergulhão; Referee: Rui Oliveira

30 September 2018	Trofense (CP)	2–3	(II) Penafiel	Trofa
15:00	João Paulo 54' (o.g.); Moraes 85' (pen.)		Areias 5', 50'; Yuri 75'	Stadium: Estádio do CD Trofense; Referee: Carlos Xistra

30 September 2018	Águeda (CP)	1–0	(II) Famalicão	Águeda
15:00	Niang 34'			Stadium: Estádio Municipal de Águeda; Referee: Rui Costa

30 September 2018	Alverca (CP)	0–3	(II) Académico de Viseu	Alverca do Ribatejo
15:00			Luisinho 63'; Rui Miguel 69'; Gasilin 80'	Stadium: Complexo Desportivo FC Alverca; Referee: André Narciso

30 September 2018	Pedras Salgadas (CP)	1–0	(II) Académica	Pedras Salgadas
15:00	Carlos Mendes 2'			Stadium: Estádio da Portelinha; Referee: Marco Cruz

30 September 2018	Portalegrense (D)	0–3	(II) Farense	Portalegre
15:00			Gomes 32' (pen.); Hélio Figueira 78' (o.g.); Alvarinho 81'	Stadium: Municipal de Portalegre; Referee: José Rodrigues

30 September 2018	Caçadores das Taipas (CP)	0–1	(II) Arouca	Caldas das Taipas
15:00			Kiko 59'	Stadium: Estádio do Montinho; Referee: Fábio Melo

30 September 2018	Limianos (CP)	2–1	(II) Mafra	Ponte de Lima
15:00	Ricardo Silva 10', 58'		Bruninho 56'	Stadium: Campo do Cruzeiro; Referee: Manuel Oliveira

30 September 2018	Fafe (CP)	1–0	(CP) Sp. Ideal	Fafe
15:00	Ferrinho 38'			Stadium: Estádio Municipal de Fafe; Referee: Márcio Torres

30 September 2018	Caldas (CP)	1–2	(CP) Gafanha	Caldas da Rainha
15:00	David Silva 83' (pen.)		Diogo Tavares 7', 18'	Stadium: Campo da Mata; Referee: Anzhony Rodrigues

30 September 2018	Vila Flor (D)	0–5	(CP) Amarante	Vila Flor
15:00			Miguelito 23' (pen.), 39'; Marquinhos 53' (pen.); Muacir 56', 28'	Stadium: Municipal de Vila Flor; Referee: António Moreira

30 September 2018	Vila Real (D)	2–2 (a.e.t.) (5–4 p)	(CP) Sanjoanense	Vila Real
15:00	Diogo Castro 48' (o.g.); Diogo Paixão 75'		Tisdell 41'; Kodisang 44'	Stadium: Complexo Desportivo Monte Da Forca; Referee: João Gonçalves

30 September 2018	União de Tomar (D)	0–3	(CP) Vilafranquense	Tomar
15:00			Pedro Garcia 57', 86'; Rosa 90'	Stadium: Municipal de Tomar; Referee: Pedro Viveiros

30 September 2018	Fátima (CP)	1–0	(II) Oliveirense	Fátima
15:00	Jeka 66'			Stadium: Estádio Papa Francisco; Referee: Tiago Martins

30 September 2018	Vasco da Gama Vidigueira (CP)	0–1	(II) Estoril	Vidigueira
15:00			Roberto 19'	Stadium: Municipal de Vidigueira; Referee: Pedro Ramalho

30 September 2018	Vit. Sernache (D)	1–3	(CP) Sertanense	Cernache do Bonjardim
15:00	Sandro Fernando 76'		Hugo Barbosa 39'; Kevin Pina 43'; Ricardo Pires 64'	Stadium: Municipal Nuno Álvares Pereira; Referee: Rui Soares

30 September 2018	Vale Formoso (D)	w/o	(CP) União de Leiria	Furnas
16:00 (15:00 UTC±0)			Antwi 22'; Vieira 34'; Carlos Daniel 89'	Stadium: Campo de Jogos de Santana; Referee: José Rodrigues
Note: União de Leiria won 0–3 but was later disqualified for using an unauthorized player.

== Third round ==
Number of teams per tier entering this round
Primeira Liga	LigaPro	Campeonato de Portugal	District FAs	Total
18 / 18	9 / 14	32 / 71	5 / 41	64 / 144

Times are WEST (UTC+1) (local times, if different, are in parentheses).

18 October 2018	Sertanense (CP)	0–3	(I) Benfica	Coimbra
20:45			Silva 35'; Fernandes 53'; Jonas 68'	Stadium: Estádio Municipal de Coimbra; Referee: Manuel Oliveira

19 October 2018	Vila Real (D)	0–6	(I) Porto	Vila Real
20:15			Adrián 7', 14', 45+2', 66'; Soares 49'; A. Pereira 61'	Stadium: Complexo Desportivo do Monte da Forca; Referee: António Nobre

20 October 2018	Valenciano (D)	0–7	(I) Vitória de Guimarães	Valença
15:00			Davidson 20'; Boyd 40'; Guedes 53'; Mattheus 66'; Estupiñán 71', 77'; Afonso 80'	Stadium: Estádio Dr. Lourenço Raymundo; Referee: Rui Oliveira

20 October 2018	Amora (CP)	3–4 (a.e.t.)	(I) Belenenses SAD	Amora
15:00	Duque 15'; Rúben Fidalgo 24'; Tavares 83'		Eduardo 69' (pen.); Dramé 73'; Licá 90+1'; Keita 104'	Stadium: Estádio da Medideira

20 October 2018	Cova da Piedade (II)	2–1	(I) Portimonense	Cova da Piedade
15:00	Firmino 9'; Rosa 33'		Dener 62'	Stadium: Estádio Municipal José Martins Vieira

20 October 2018	Sp. Espinho (CP)	3–3 (a.e.t.) (11–10 p)	(II) Académico de Viseu	Fiães
16:00	Paulinho 20'; Gustavo Souza 71'; Carlitos 100'		Nsor 45'; Gasilin 79'; Rui Miguel 113'	Stadium: Estádio do Bolhão

20 October 2018	Loures (CP)	1–2	(I) Sporting CP	Alverca do Ribatejo
20:45	Juninho 90+1'		Fernandes 42'; Nani 56'	Stadium: Complexo Desportivo FC Alverca

21 October 2018	Farense (II)	1–3	(II) Arouca	Faro
15:00	Irobiso 45+2'		Malele 1'; Adilio 69' (pen.); Massaia 78'	Stadium: Estádio de S. Luís

21 October 2018	Fafe (CP)	0–0 (a.e.t.) (2–4 p)	(II) Penafiel	Fafe
15:00				Stadium: Municipal de Fafe

21 October 2018	Limianos (CP)	0–2	(II) Sp. Covilhã	Ponte de Lima
15:00			Castanheira 7'; Makouta 20'	Stadium: Campo do Cruzeiro; Referee: Gustavo Correia

21 October 2018	Casa Pia (CP)	2–1	(CP) Angrense	Lisbon
15:00	Embaló 63'; Gregório 77' (pen.)		Pedro Aguiar 81' (pen.)	Stadium: Estádio Pina Manique; Referee: João Mendes

21 October 2018	Montalegre (CP)	2–1 (a.e.t.)	(CP) Oriental	Montalegre
15:00	Rogério Pinto 20'; Pereira 104'		João Damil 87'	Stadium: Campo Dr. Diogo Alves Vaz Pereira; Referee: Hugo Pacheco

21 October 2018	Paços de Ferreira (II)	2–0	(CP) Gafanha	Paços de Ferreira
15:00	Douglas Tanque 46', 56'			Stadium: Estádio Capital Do Móvel

21 October 2018	Silves (D)	2–1 (a.e.t.)	(CP) Chaves Satélite	Silves
15:00	Fua 119'; Tomás Seca 120'		Pedro Pedroso 102'	Stadium: Estádio Dr Francisco Vieira; Referee: José Gorjão

21 October 2018	Lusitano Vildemoinhos (CP)	4–3 (a.e.t.)	(I) Nacional	Viseu
15:00	Nuno Rodrigues 27'; Murilo Rosa 55' (pen.); Edgar Lopes 110'; Paulo Oliveira 114'		Jota 15'; Júlio César 45', 108'	Stadium: Campo Dos Trambelos; Referee: Artur Soares Dias

21 October 2018	Pedras Salgadas (CP)	1–4	(I) Chaves	Pedras Salgadas
15:00	Miguel Lima 55'		Perdigão 5'; Teixeira 44'; André Luís 59'; Avto 90+3'	Stadium: Estádio da Portelinha

21 October 2018	Vale Formoso (D)	4–3 (a.e.t.)	(CP) Coimbrões	Furnas
13:00 (12:00 UTC±0)	Alfredo Garcia 31' (pen.), 89', 104'; Rodrigo Rosa 114'		Diogo Mota 11'; Filipe Cardoso 25' (pen.); Hélio Moreira 119'	Stadium: Campo do Complexo Desportivo de Furnas; Referee: Marco Pereira

21 October 2018	Leixões (II)	3–1	(CP) Amarante	Matosinhos
15:00	Bura 37' (pen.); Brandão 64'; Monteiro 81'		Muacir 84'	Stadium: Estádio do Mar

21 October 2018	Mirandela (CP)	1–2 (a.e.t.)	(I) Feirense	Mirandela
15:00	Kelvin 14' (pen.)		Machado 27' (pen.); J. Silva 94'	Stadium: Estádio São Sebastião

21 October 2018	Moura (CP)	0–0 (a.e.t.) (3–4 p)	(I) Marítimo	Moura
15:00				Stadium: Estádio do Moura Atlético Clube; Referee: Hélder Malheiro

21 October 2018	Estoril (II)	1–1 (a.e.t.) (3–4 p)	(I) Tondela	Estoril
15:00	Aylton 53'		Tomané 59'	Stadium: Estádio António Coimbra da Mota; Referee: Nuno Almeida

21 October 2018	Santa Iria (CP)	0–2	(CP) Praiense	Santa Iria de Azoia, Loures
15:00			Itto Cruz 18'; Fonseca 57'	Stadium: Campo de Jogos Tomaz Reynolds; Referee: Paulo Barradas

21 October 2018	Torreense (CP)	1–5	(I) Rio Ave	Torres Vedras
15:00	Bonifácio 28'		Galeno 3'; Lopes 25'; Carlos Vinícius 55', 65'; Moreira 90'	Stadium: Estádio Manuel Marques

21 October 2018	Maria da Fonte (CP)	1–2	(I) Santa Clara	Póvoa de Lanhoso
15:00	João Paulo 71'		Clemente 69'; Lamas 75'	Stadium: Campo dos Moínhos Novos

21 October 2018	Vilafranquense (CP)	0–4	(CP) Anadia	Vila Franca de Xira
15:00			Silvestre 3'; Marcelo 65'; Michael dos Santos 75'; Mino 90'	Stadium: Campo do Cevadeiro; Referee: Gonçalo Carreira

21 October 2018	Águeda (CP)	1–0	(CP) Louletano	Águeda
15:00	Niang 14'			Stadium: Estádio Municipal de Águeda; Referee: João Casegas Almeida

21 October 2018	São Martinho (CP)	0–1	(I) Moreirense	São Martinho do Campo
15:00			Chiquinho 60'	Stadium: Estádio Comendador Abílio Ferreira de Oliveira

21 October 2018	Fátima (CP)	1–4	(I) Boavista	Fátima
15:00	Zé Miguel 42'		Mateus 15', 24'; Espinho 63'; Rochinha 80'	Stadium: Estádio Papa Francisco

21 October 2018	União da Madeira (CP)	2–0	(D) União Santiago	Ribeira Brava
15:00	Adelaja 4'; Luizinho 50'			Stadium: Centro Desportivo da Madeira; Referee: Duarte Oliveira

21 October 2018	Armacenenses (CP)	1–2	(I) Vitória de Setúbal	Parchal
15:00	Márcio Meira 50' (pen.)		Té 19'; Alex 67'	Stadium: Estádio Municipal da Bela Vista

21 October 2018	Sacavenense (CP)	1–3	(I) Desportivo das Aves	Sacavém
16:00	Ivo Braz 35'		Galo 33'; Derley 42'; Nildo Petrolina 90+5'	Stadium: Campo do Sacavenense; Referee: André Narciso

21 October 2018	Felgueiras 1932 (CP)	0–1	(I) Braga	Felgueiras
20:00			Sousa 86'	Stadium: Estádio Municipal Dr. Machado Matos; Referee: Fábio Veríssimo

== Fourth round ==
Number of teams per tier entering this round
Primeira Liga	LigaPro	Campeonato de Portugal	District FAs	Total
16 / 18	6 / 14	8 / 71	2 / 41	32 / 144

Times are WET (UTC±0) (local times, if different, are in parentheses).

22 November 2018	Benfica (I)	2–1	(II) Arouca	Lisbon
20:45	Jonas 42'; Silva 90+3'	Report	Bukia 19'	Stadium: Estádio da Luz; Referee: Hélder Malheiro

24 November 2018	Cova da Piedade (II)	0–3 (a.e.t.)	(I) Desportivo das Aves	Cova da Piedade
14:30		Report	Derley 97', 106'; Rodrigues 105'	Stadium: Estádio Municipal José Martins Vieira; Referee: Manuel Oliveira

24 November 2018	Lusitano Vildemoinhos (CP)	1–4	(I) Sporting CP	Viseu
15:00	Braz 44'	Report	Dost 41', 71'; Fernandes 64'; Diaby 73'	Stadium: Estádio do Fontelo; Referee: António Nobre

24 November 2018	Porto (I)	2–0	(I) Belenenses SAD	Porto
20:45	Soares 13'; Otávio 58'	Report		Stadium: Estádio do Dragão; Referee: Nuno Almeida

25 November 2018	Montalegre (CP)	1–0	(CP) Águeda	Montalegre
14:30	Hidelvis Jardim 31' (o.g.)	Report		Stadium: Campo Dr. Diogo Alves Vaz Pereira; Referee: José Rodrigues

25 November 2018	Sp. Covilhã (II)	0–3	(I) Moreirense	Covilhã
14:30		Report	Chiquinho 46'; Makouta 55' (o.g.); Texeira	Stadium: Estádio Municipal José Santos Pinto; Referee: João Pinheiro

25 November 2018	Rio Ave (I)	7–0	(D) Silves	Vila do Conde
15:00	Schmidt 6', 45'; Lopes 10'; Dala 26'; Carlos Vinícius 77', 89'; Oliveira 90' (o.g.)			Stadium: Estádio dos Arcos

25 November 2018	Leixões (II)	1–0	(CP) Anadia	Matosinhos
15:00				Stadium: Estádio do Mar

25 November 2018	Paços de Ferreira (II)	3–1	(CP) Casa Pia	Paços de Ferreira
15:00				Stadium: Estádio Capital Do Móvel

25 November 2018	Penafiel (II)	1–4	(I) Vitória de Setúbal	Penafiel
15:00				Stadium: Estádio Municipal 25 de Abril

25 November 2018	Sp. Espinho (CP)	0–4	(I) Boavista	Fiães
15:00				Stadium: Estádio do Bolhão

25 November 2018	União da Madeira (CP)	0–2	(I) Vitória de Guimarães	Ribeira Brava
15:00				Stadium: Centro Desportivo da Madeira

25 November 2018	Tondela (I)	7–0	(D) Vale Formoso	Tondela
15:00				Stadium: Estádio João Cardoso

25 November 2018	Marítimo (I)	0–3	(I) Feirense	Funchal
16:00		Report	J. Silva 10', 62'; Machado 38'	Stadium: Estádio do Marítimo; Referee: João Capela

25 November 2018	Santa Clara (I)	1–2	(I) Chaves	Ponta Delgada
17:00 (16:00 UTC−1)	Cardoso 57'	Report	Platiny 25'; André Aguiar 29'	Stadium: Estádio de São Miguel; Referee: Rui Costa

25 November 2018	Braga (I)	2–1	(CP) Praiense	Braga
19:30	Novais 47'; Paulinho 89'	Report	João Peixoto 29' (pen.)	Stadium: Estádio Municipal de Braga; Referee: João Pinto

== Fifth round ==
Number of teams per tier entering this round
Primeira Liga	LigaPro	Campeonato de Portugal	District FAs	Total
13 / 18	2 / 14	1 / 71	0 / 41	16 / 144

Times are WET (UTC±0).

18 December 2018	Vitória de Setúbal (I)	0–1 (a.e.t.)	(I) Braga	Setúbal
19:00		Report	Pablo 94'	Stadium: Estádio do Bonfim; Referee: Luís Godinho

18 December 2018	Leixões (II)	2–2 (a.e.t.) (4–2 p)	(I) Tondela	Matosinhos
20:00	Roniel 1' (pen.); Pedro Almeida 78'	Report	Delgado 20'; Tomané 25'	Stadium: Estádio do Mar; Referee: António Nobre
	Penalties
	Bura (penalty scored); Brandão (penalty scored); Pedro Almeida (penalty scored); Martins (penalty missed); Roniel (penalty scored)		(penalty missed) Xavier; (penalty scored) Alves; (penalty scored) Bruno; (penalty missed) Mendes

18 December 2018	Porto (I)	4–3	(I) Moreirense	Porto
20:45	Felipe 12'; Hernâni 16'; Marega 65', 89'	Report	Texeira 8'; Santos 45'; Tavares 90'	Stadium: Estádio do Dragão; Referee: Carlos Xistra

19 December 2018	Feirense (I)	1–1 (a.e.t.) (4–2 p)	(II) Paços de Ferreira	Santa Maria da Feira
15:00	T. Silva 113'	Report	Baixinho 97'	Stadium: Estádio Marcolino de Castro; Referee: André Narciso
	Penalties
	Edinho (penalty scored); T. Silva (penalty missed); Valencia (penalty scored); Crivellaro (penalty scored); Machado (penalty scored)		(penalty scored) Pedrinho; (penalty scored) Baixinho; (penalty missed) Rocha; (penalty missed) Wágner

19 December 2018	Desportivo das Aves (I)	2–0	(I) Chaves	Vila das Aves
16:00	Mama Baldé 46'; Gomes 63'			Stadium: Estádio do CD Aves; Referee: Manuel Mota

19 December 2018	Boavista (I)	0–1	(I) Vitória de Guimarães	Porto
18:00		Report	Dodô 49'	Stadium: Estádio do Bessa; Referee: Fábio Veríssimo

19 December 2018	Sporting CP (I)	5–2	(I) Rio Ave	Lisbon
19:30	Diaby 4', 78'; Dost 32', 62'; Fernandes 42'	Report	Gaspar 45' (o.g.); Carlos Vinícius 84' (pen.)	Stadium: Estádio José Alvalade; Referee: João Pinheiro

19 December 2018	Montalegre (CP)	0–1	(I) Benfica	Montalegre
20:45		Report	Conti 30'	Stadium: Campo Dr. Diogo Alves Vaz Pereira; Referee: Manuel Oliveira

== Quarter-finals ==
Number of teams per tier entering this round
Primeira Liga	LigaPro	Campeonato de Portugal	District FAs	Total
7 / 18	1 / 14	0 / 71	0 / 41	8 / 144

Times are WET (UTC±0).

15 January 2019	Desportivo das Aves (I)	1–2	(I) Braga	Vila das Aves
18:00	Falcão 70'	Report	Eduardo 11', 40'	Stadium: Estádio do CD Aves; Referee: Tiago Martins

15 January 2019	Leixões (II)	1–2 (a.e.t.)	(I) Porto	Matosinhos
19:30	Zé Paulo 78'	Report	Herrera 11'; Hernâni 118'	Stadium: Estádio do Mar; Referee: João Capela

15 January 2019	Vitória de Guimarães (I)	0–1	(I) Benfica	Guimarães
20:45		Report	Félix 14'	Stadium: Estádio D. Afonso Henriques; Referee: Hugo Miguel

16 January 2019	Feirense (I)	0–2	(I) Sporting CP	Santa Maria da Feira
20:45		Report	Wendel 64'; Fernandes 66'	Stadium: Estádio Marcolino de Castro; Referee: Fábio Veríssimo

== Semi-finals ==
Number of teams per tier entering this round
Primeira Liga	LigaPro	Campeonato de Portugal	District FAs	Total
4 / 18	0 / 15	0 / 79	0 / 41	4 / 153

Times are WET (UTC±0).

26 February 2019
20:15

Porto (I)	3–0	(I) Braga
Telles 37' (pen.); Soares 64'; Brahimi 90+4'	Report

Estádio do Dragão, Porto
Referee: João Pinheiro
2 April 2019
20:15

Braga (I)	1–1	(I) Porto
Paulinho 41'	Report	D. Pereira 71'

Estádio Municipal de Braga, Braga
Referee: Manuel Mota

Porto won 4–1 on aggregate.

6 February 2019
20:45

Benfica (I)	2–1	(I) Sporting CP
Gabriel 16'; Ilori 64' (o.g.)	Report	Fernandes 82'

Estádio da Luz, Lisbon
Attendance: 55,636
Referee: Luís Godinho
3 April 2019
20:45

Sporting CP (I)	1–0	(I) Benfica
Fernandes 75'	Report

Estádio José Alvalade, Lisbon
Attendance: 34,221
Referee: Hugo Miguel

2–2 on aggregate. Sporting CP won on away goals.

== Final ==
25 May 2019
17:15 WEST

Sporting CP	2–2 (a.e.t.)	Porto
D. Pereira 45' (o.g.); Dost 101'	Report	Soares 40'; Felipe 120+1'
Penalties
Dost (penalty missed); Fernandes (penalty scored); Mathieu (penalty scored); Raphinha (penalty scored); Coates (penalty scored); Luiz Phellype (penalty scored)	5–4	(penalty scored) Soares; (penalty scored) D. Pereira; (penalty missed) Pepe; (penalty scored) Adrián; (penalty scored) Hernâni; (penalty missed) Fernando

Estádio Nacional, Oeiras
Attendance: 38,000
Referee: Jorge Sousa

== Bracket ==
Third round
20 October 2018
Sp. Espinho (p)	3 (11)
Académico de Viseu	3 (10)
21 October 2018
Fátima	1
Boavista	4
21 October 2018
União da Madeira	2
União Santiago	0
20 October 2018
Valenciano	0
Vitória de Guimarães	7
21 October 2018
Montalegre (a.e.t.)	2
Oriental	1
21 October 2018
Águeda	1
Louletano	0
18 October 2018
Sertanense	0
Benfica	3
21 October 2018
Farense	1
Arouca	3
21 October 2018
Moura	0 (3)
Marítimo (p)	0 (4)
21 October 2018
Mirandela	1
Feirense (a.e.t.)	2
21 October 2018
Paços de Ferreira	2
Gafanha	0
21 October 2018
Casa Pia	2
Angrense	1
21 October 2018
Lusitano Vildemoinhos (a.e.t.)	4
Nacional	3
20 October 2018
Loures	1
Sporting CP	2
21 October 2018
Torreense	1
Rio Ave	5
21 October 2018
Silves (a.e.t.)	2
Chaves	1
21 October 2018
Leixões	3
Amarante	1
21 October 2018
Vilafranquense	0
Anadia	4
21 October 2018
Estoril	1 (3)
Tondela (p)	1 (4)
21 October 2018
Vale Formoso (a.e.t.)	4
Coimbrões	3
19 October 2018
Vila Real	0
Porto	6
20 October 2018
Amora	3
Belenenses SAD (a.e.t.)	4
21 October 2018
Limianos	0
Sp. Covilhã	2
21 October 2018
São Martinho	0
Moreirense	1
20 October 2018
Cova da Piedade	2
Portimonense	1
21 October 2018
Sacavenense	1
Desportivo das Aves	3
21 October 2018
Maria da Fonte	1
Santa Clara	2
21 October 2018
Pedras Salgadas	1
Chaves	4
21 October 2018
Fafe	0 (2)
Penafiel (p)	0 (4)
21 October 2018
Armacenenses	1
Vitória de Setúbal	2
21 October 2018
Felgueiras 1932	0
Braga	1
21 October 2018
Santa Iria	0
Praiense	2

Fourth round
25 November 2018
Sp. Espinho	0
Boavista	4
25 November 2018
União da Madeira	0
Vitória de Guimarães	2
25 November 2018
Montalegre	1
Águeda	0
22 November 2018
Benfica	2
Arouca	1
25 November 2018
Marítimo	0
Feirense	3
25 November 2018
Paços de Ferreira	3
Casa Pia	1
24 November 2018
Lusitano Vildemoinhos	1
Sporting CP	4
25 November 2018
Rio Ave	7
Silves	0
25 November 2018
Leixões	1
Anadia	0
25 November 2018
Tondela	7
Vale Formoso	0
24 November 2018
Porto	2
Belenenses SAD	0
25 November 2018
Sp. Covilhã	0
Moreirense	3
24 November 2018
Cova da Piedade	0
Desportivo das Aves (a.e.t.)	3
25 November 2018
Santa Clara	1
Chaves	2
25 November 2018
Penafiel	1
Vitória de Setúbal	4
25 November 2018
Braga	2
Praiense	1

Fifth round
19 December 2018
Boavista	0
Vitória de Guimarães	1
19 December 2018
Montalegre	0
Benfica	1
19 December 2018
Feirense (p)	1 (4)
Paços de Ferreira	1 (2)
19 December 2018
Sporting CP	5
Rio Ave	2
18 December 2018
Leixões (p)	2 (4)
Tondela	2 (2)
18 December 2018
Porto	4
Moreirense	3
19 December 2018
Desportivo das Aves	2
Chaves	0
18 December 2018
Vitória de Setúbal	0
Braga (a.e.t.)	1

Quarter-finals
15 January 2019
Vitória de Guimarães	0
Benfica	1
16 January 2019
Feirense	0
Sporting CP	2
15 January 2019
Leixões	1
Porto	2
15 January 2019
Desportivo das Aves	1
Braga	2

Semi-finals
6 February/3 April 2019
Benfica	2	0
Sporting CP (a)	1	1
26 February/2 April 2019
Porto	3	1
Braga	0	1

Final
25 May 2019
Sporting CP	2 (5)
Porto	2 (4)

== Television rights ==
The following matches were or broadcast live on Portuguese television:

Round	RTP	Sport TV	Value
Third round	Sertanense 0–3 Benfica; Loures 1–2 Sporting CP		€50,000
Third round		Vila Real 0–6 Porto; Felgueiras 1932 0–1 Braga	€50,000
Fourth round	Benfica 2–1 Arouca; Porto 2–0 Belenenses SAD		€75,000
Fourth round		Lusitano Vildemoinhos 1–4 Sporting CP; Braga 2–1 Praiense	€75,000
Fifth round	Porto 4–3 Moreirense; Montalegre 0–1 Benfica		€100,000
Fifth round		Vitória de Setúbal 0–1 Braga; Boavista 0–1 Vitória de Guimarães; Sporting CP 5–2 Rio Ave	€100,000
Quarter-finals	Vitória de Guimarães 0–1 Benfica; Feirense 0–2 Sporting CP		€125,000
Quarter-finals		Desportivo das Aves 1–2 Braga; Leixões 1–2 Porto	€125,000
Semi-finals	Benfica 2–1 Sporting CP; Sporting CP 1–0 Benfica		€150,000
Semi-finals		Porto 3–0 Braga; Braga 1–1 Porto	€150,000
Final	FC Porto 2–2 Sporting CP		€300,000
