= 2011–12 Segunda Divisão =

Segunda Divisão
- Season: 2011–12
- Champions: Varzim; 3rd D3 title

The 2011–12 Segunda Divisão season was the 78th season since its establishment and the 65th season of recognised third-tier football in Portugal. União da Madeira were the defending champions.

== Zona Norte ==
Pos	Team	Pld	W	D	L	GF	GA	GD	Pts	Qualification or relegation
1	Varzim (A)	30	20	8	2	48	12	+36	68	Qualification to championship play-offs
2	Fafe	30	16	6	8	46	29	+17	54	
3	Chaves	30	15	9	6	41	26	+15	54	
4	Mirandela	30	14	10	6	55	32	+23	52	
5	Tirsense	30	11	11	8	39	29	+10	44	
6	Limianos	30	11	11	8	34	25	+9	44	
7	Ribeirão	30	10	14	6	39	31	+8	44	
8	Ribeira Brava	30	12	6	12	33	37	−4	42	
9	Famalicão	30	10	9	11	29	32	−3	39	
10	Macedo de Cavaleiros	30	10	9	11	43	48	−5	39	
11	Vizela	30	9	11	10	40	42	−2	38	
12	Marítimo B	30	10	8	12	41	45	−4	38	
13	Camacha (R)	30	8	10	12	29	36	−7	34	Relegation to Terceira Divisão
14	Lousada (R)	30	8	8	14	30	45	−15	32	Relegation to Terceira Divisão
15	Merelinense (R)	30	3	7	20	33	68	−35	16	Relegation to Terceira Divisão
16	AD Oliveirense (R)	30	1	7	22	14	57	−43	10	Relegation to Terceira Divisão

Source: nifs.no
Rules for classification: 1) points; 2) goal difference; 3) number of goals scored.
(A) Advance to a further round; (R) Relegated

== Zona Centro ==
=== Stadia and locations ===
Club	City	Stadium	Capacity
Aliados Lordelo	Paredes	Estádio Cidade de Lordelo	2,350
Amarante	Amarante	Estádio Municipal de Amarante	16,800
Anadia	Anadia	Municipal Engº Sílvio Henriques Cerveira	6,500
Angrense	Angra do Heroísmo	Estádio Municipal de Angra do Heroísmo	2,050
Boavista	Porto	Estádio do Bessa	30,000
Cinfães	Cinfães	Municipal Prof. Cerveira Pinto	10,000
Coimbrões	Vila Nova de Gaia	Parque Silva Matos	1,800
Espinho	Espinho	Estádio Comendador Manuel Violas	7,500
Gondomar	Gondomar	Estádio de São Miguel	2,450
Madalena	Madalena, Azores	Municipal da Madalena	2,500
Padroense	Padrão da Légua, Matosinhos	Estádio do Padroense FC	3,000
Paredes	Paredes	Cidade Desportiva de Paredes	1,000
Oliveira do Bairro	Oliveira do Bairro	Estádio Municipal De Oliveira Do Bairro	1,500
Operário	Lagoa, Azores	João Gualberto Borges Arruda	2,500
S. João de Ver	Santa Maria da Feira	Estádio Sp. Clube São João De Ver	5,000
Tondela	Tondela	Estádio João Cardoso	7,500

=== League table ===
Pos	Team	Pld	W	D	L	GF	GA	GD	Pts	Qualification or relegation
1	Tondela (A)	30	19	6	5	49	22	+27	63	Qualification to championship play-offs
2	Espinho	30	19	5	6	50	32	+18	62	
3	Operário	30	15	7	8	34	26	+8	52	
4	Boavista	30	15	5	10	43	31	+12	50	
5	Amarante	30	13	10	7	48	30	+18	49	
6	S. João de Ver	30	15	4	11	43	46	−3	49	
7	Gondomar	30	13	5	12	27	31	−4	44	
8	Cinfães	30	12	7	11	35	40	−5	43	
9	Coimbrões	30	9	15	6	30	31	−1	42	
10	Anadia	30	11	7	12	45	42	+3	40	
11	Padroense	30	11	6	13	47	50	−3	39	
12	Aliados Lordelo	30	10	7	13	41	40	+1	37	
13	Oliveira do Bairro (R)	30	7	7	16	34	50	−16	28	Relegation to Terceira Divisão
14	Angrense (R)	30	5	8	17	36	49	−13	23	Relegation to Terceira Divisão
15	Paredes (R)	30	6	5	19	30	50	−20	23	Relegation to Terceira Divisão
16	Madalena (R)	30	5	6	19	32	54	−22	21	Relegation to Terceira Divisão

Source: nifs.no
Rules for classification: 1) points; 2) goal difference; 3) number of goals scored.
(A) Advance to a further round; (R) Relegated

== Zona Sul ==
Pos	Team	Pld	W	D	L	GF	GA	GD	Pts	Qualification or relegation
1	Fátima (A)	30	18	6	6	50	30	+20	60	Qualification to championship play-offs
2	Oriental	30	16	8	6	49	17	+32	56	
3	Torreense	30	15	11	4	47	27	+20	56	
4	Carregado	30	15	8	7	57	38	+19	53	
5	Pinhalnovense	30	16	5	9	47	32	+15	53	
6	Mafra	30	10	16	4	33	22	+11	46	
7	Louletano	30	13	7	10	28	33	−5	46	
8	Sertanense	30	11	10	9	37	32	+5	43	
9	Estrela Vendas Novas	30	11	5	14	35	34	+1	38	
10	Tourizense	30	8	11	11	30	34	−4	35	
11	1º Dezembro	30	8	10	12	28	29	−1	34	
12	Juventude	30	9	5	16	29	42	−13	32	
13	Monsanto (R)	30	6	11	13	28	41	−13	29	Relegation to Terceira Divisão
14	Atlético SC (R)	30	5	11	14	31	53	−22	26	Relegation to Terceira Divisão
15	Moura (R)	30	6	7	17	28	57	−29	25	Relegation to Terceira Divisão
16	Caldas (R)	30	3	9	18	17	53	−36	18	Relegation to Terceira Divisão

Source: nifs.no
Rules for classification: 1) points; 2) goal difference; 3) number of goals scored.
(A) Advance to a further round; (R) Relegated

== Play-offs ==
Pos	Team	Pld	W	D	L	GF	GA	GD	Pts	Promotion
1	Varzim (C, P)	4	3	1	0	10	2	+8	10	Promotion to Segunda Liga
2	Tondela (P)	4	1	2	1	5	6	−1	5	Promotion to Segunda Liga
3	Fátima	4	0	1	3	4	11	−7	1	

Rules for classification: 1) points; 2) goal difference; 3) number of goals scored.
(C) Champions; (P) Promoted

=== Top goalscorers ===
Rank	Player	Club	Goals
1	(Brazil) Rafael Porcellis	Fátima	3
2	(Portugal) André André	Varzim	2
2	(Brazil) Rafael Batatinha	Tondela	2
2	(Portugal) Marcelo	Tondela	2
2	(Portugal) Duarte Duarte	Varzim	2
2	(Portugal) Rui Coentrão	Varzim	2
7	(Portugal) Márcio Sousa	Tondela	1
7	(Portugal) João Faria	Varzim	1
7	(Portugal) Nelsinho	Varzim	1
7	(Brazil) Telmo	Varzim	1
7	(Brazil) Kaiser	Varzim	1
7	(Portugal) Helmut Ari	Fátima	1
