= Rafael Fonseca =

Rafael Fonseca may refer to:

- Rafael Fonseca (physician), Mexican-American physician and researcher
- Rafael Fonseca (footballer) (born 2001), Portuguese football defender
- Rafa Fonseca (born 1992), Portuguese football forward
