= 2019 Taça de Portugal final =

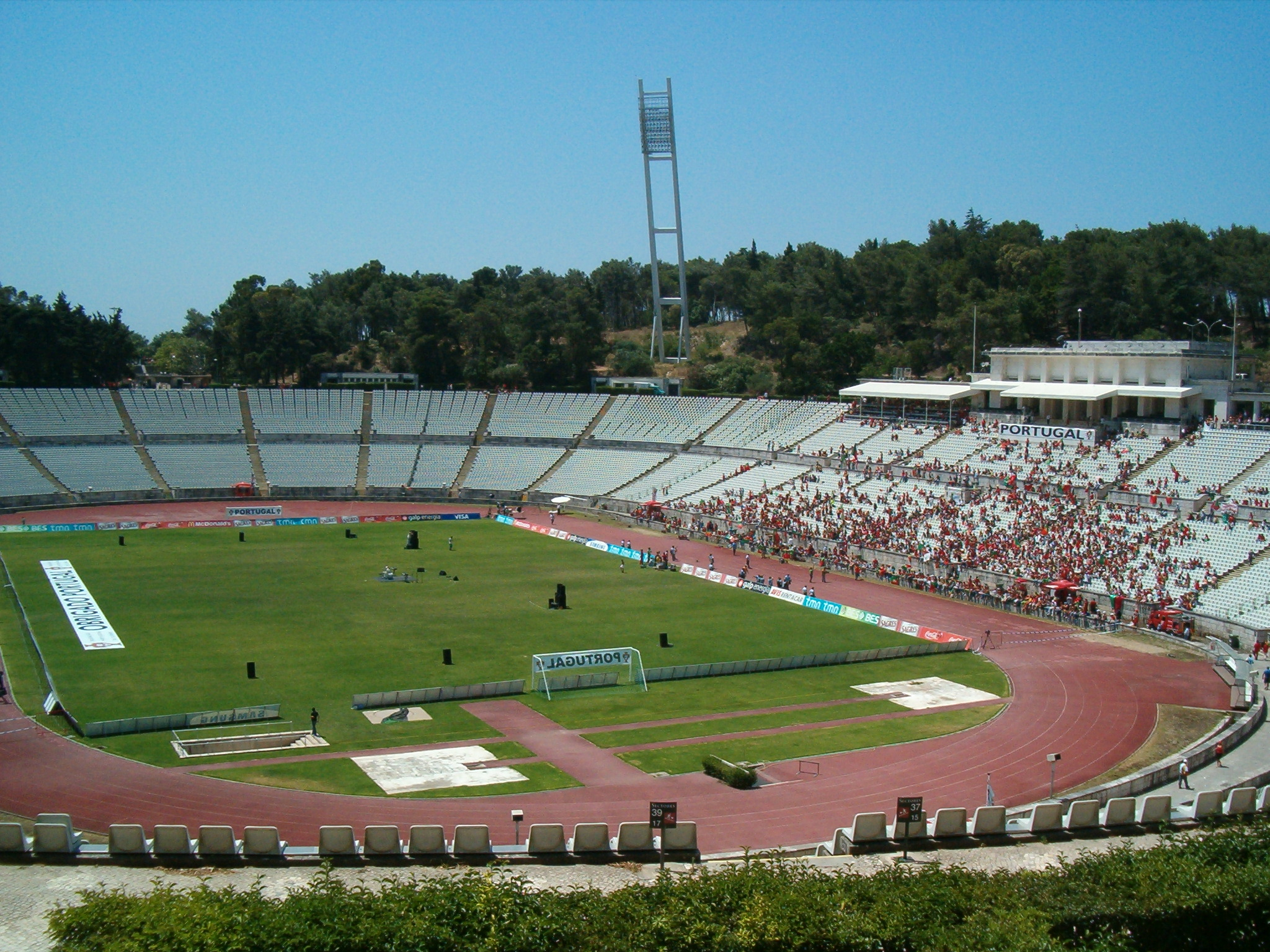
- Estádio Nacional
- Event: 2018–19 Taça de Portugal
Sporting CP	Porto
2	2
- After extra time Sporting won 5–4 on penalties
- Date: 25 May 2019
- Venue: Estádio Nacional, Oeiras
- Man of the Match: Jérémy Mathieu (Sporting CP)
- Fair Player of the Match: Renan Ribeiro (Sporting CP)
- Referee: Jorge Sousa
- Attendance: 38,000

The 2019 Taça de Portugal final was the last match of the 2018–19 Taça de Portugal, which decided the winners of the 79th season of the Taça de Portugal. It was played on 25 May 2019 at the Estádio Nacional in Oeiras, between Sporting CP and Porto.

The defending champions were Desportivo das Aves, however, they were knocked out in the quarter-finals by Braga.

== Route to the final ==
Sporting CP		Round	Porto
Opponent	Result	2018–19 Taça de Portugal	Opponent	Result
Loures	2–1 (A)	Third round	Vila Real	6–0 (A)
Lusitano Vildemoinhos	4–1 (A)	Fourth round	Belenenses SAD	2–0 (H)
Rio Ave	5–2 (H)	Fifth round	Moreirense	4–3 (H)
Feirense	2–0 (A)	Quarter-finals	Leixões	2–1 (A)
Benfica	1–2 (A)	Semi-finals	Braga	3–0 (H)
Benfica	1–0 (H)	Semi-finals	Braga	1–1 (A)

Note: H = home fixture, A = away fixture

== Broadcasting ==
The match will be broadcast in Portugal on television by both competition's broadcasting partners: RTP (on RTP1) and SportTV (on SportTV 1).

== Match ==
=== Details ===
25 May 2019
17:15 WEST

Sporting CP	2–2 (a.e.t.)	Porto
D. Pereira 45' (o.g.); Dost 101'	Report	Soares 40'; Felipe 120+1'
Penalties
Dost (penalty missed); Fernandes (penalty scored); Mathieu (penalty scored); Raphinha (penalty scored); Coates (penalty scored); Luiz Phellype (penalty scored)	5–4	(penalty scored) Soares; (penalty scored) D. Pereira; (penalty missed) Pepe; (penalty scored) Adrián; (penalty scored) Hernâni; (penalty missed) Fernando

Estádio Nacional, Oeiras
Attendance: 38,000
Referee: Jorge Sousa

Sporting CP	Porto

GK	40	(Brazil) Renan Ribeiro
RB	76	(Portugal) Bruno Gaspar	(yellow card) 25'	(substituted off) 65'
CB	4	(Uruguay) Sebastián Coates	(yellow card) 90+4'
CB	22	(France) Jérémy Mathieu
LB	9	(Argentina) Marcos Acuña
CM	86	(Serbia) Nemanja Gudelj	(yellow card) 39'	(substituted off) 90+3'
CM	37	(Brazil) Wendel		(substituted off) 106'
RW	21	(Brazil) Raphinha	(yellow card) 107'
AM	8	(Portugal) Bruno Fernandes (c)	(yellow card) 120'
LW	23	(Mali) Abdoulay Diaby		(substituted off) 74'
CF	29	(Brazil) Luiz Phellype	(yellow card) 113'
Substitutes:
GK	19	(France) Romain Salin
DF	3	(Portugal) Tiago Ilori		(substituted on) 65'
DF	5	(Brazil) Jefferson		(substituted on) 106'
DF	6	(Portugal) André Pinto
MF	98	(Ivory Coast) Idrissa Doumbia		(substituted on) 90+3'
FW	28	(Netherlands) Bas Dost		(substituted on) 74'
FW	77	(Portugal) Jovane Cabral
Manager:
(Netherlands) Marcel Keizer

GK	26	(Brazil) Vaná
RB	3	(Brazil) Éder Militão		(substituted off) 102'
CB	28	(Brazil) Felipe
CB	33	(Portugal) Pepe
LB	13	(Brazil) Alex Telles	(yellow card) 105+2'	(substituted off) 106'
CM	16	(Mexico) Héctor Herrera (c)
CM	22	(Portugal) Danilo Pereira	(yellow card) 99'
CM	25	(Brazil) Otávio		(substituted off) 77'
RW	11	(Mali) Moussa Marega		(substituted off) 99'
CF	29	(Brazil) Francisco Soares	(yellow card) 96'
LW	8	(Algeria) Yacine Brahimi
Substitutes:
GK	40	(Brazil) Fabiano
DF	2	(Uruguay) Maxi Pereira
DF	12	(Portugal) Wilson Manafá	(yellow card) 120'	(substituted on) 77'
MF	10	(Spain) Óliver Torres
FW	7	(Portugal) Hernâni		(substituted on) 102'
FW	20	(Spain) Adrián López		(substituted on) 99'
FW	37	(Brazil) Fernando		(substituted on) 106'
Manager:
(Portugal) Sérgio Conceição

Man of the Match:
Jérémy Mathieu (Sporting CP)
Fair Player of the Match:
Renan Ribeiro (Sporting CP)

Assistant referees:
António Godinho
Nuno Manso
Fourth official:
Carlos Xistra
Video assistant referee:
Rui Costa
Assistant video assistant referees:
Nuno Almeida
Paulo Soares

Match rules

- 90 minutes
- 30 minutes of extra time if necessary
- Penalty shoot-out if scores still level
- Seven named substitutes
- Maximum of three substitutions, with a fourth allowed in extra time

== See also ==
- FC Porto–Sporting CP rivalry
- 2018–19 FC Porto season
- 2018–19 Sporting CP season
- 2019 Taça da Liga final
