= Coentrão =

Coentrão is a Portuguese family name and can refer to the following people:

- Fábio Coentrão (born 1988), Portuguese former football defender
- José Carlos Coentrão Marafona (born 1987), Portuguese football goalkeeper
- Rui Coentrão (born 1992), Portuguese football defender
