= João Vieira (footballer, born 1991) =

Portuguese footballer

Personal information
- Full name: João André Ribeiro Vieira
- Date of birth: 19 December 1991 (age 34)
- Place of birth: Leiria, Portugal
- Height: 1.89 m (6 ft 2 1/2 in)
- Position: Striker

Team information
- Current team: Caldas
- Number: 94

Youth career
- 1999–2010: União de Leiria

Senior career*
Years	Team	Apps	(Gls)
2010–2011	União de Leiria	0	(0)
2010–2011	→ Atlético Reguengos (loan)	28	(4)
2011–2013	Marítimo	0	(0)
2011–2013	Marítimo B	52	(10)
2013–2014	Torreense	31	(26)
2014–2015	Chaves	38	(10)
2015–2017	Moreirense	0	(0)
2016	→ Feirense (loan)	9	(0)
2016–2017	→ Vizela (loan)	11	(2)
2017–2019	União de Leiria	46	(26)
2019–2020	Vilafranquense	45	(15)
2020–2021	Cova da Piedade	34	(13)
2021–2022	Casa Pia	29	(4)
2022–2023	Torreense	27	(3)
2023–2024	Varzim	20	(1)
2024–2025	Marinhense	15	(1)
2026–	Caldas	7	(2)
- * Club domestic league appearances and goals as of 7 May 2026

João André Ribeiro Vieira (born 19 December 1991) is a Portuguese professional footballer who plays as a striker for Liga 3 club Caldas.

== Club career ==
Born in Leiria, Vieira joined hometown União Leiria's youth system at the age of 8 where he completed his formation. He made his senior debuts in the Second Division at the third level of the league system, on loan to Atlético Reguengos in the 2010-11 season. In the 2011 summer he left União Leiria whiteout never appeared officially for its first team to spend two seasons at Marítimo B, the reserve team of Club Sport Marítimo.

The first season in the Second Division where he scored 7 goals in 19 Appearances. In the following campaign Vieira made his professional debut in a match against Leixões on 12 August 2012. He netted twice in the season's and his last match for the club – in a 2–0 away win against Aves.

For 2013-14, Vieira joined Torreense in the Campeonato Nacional, the newly created third-tier football league in Portugal after the merging of the Segunda Divisão and Terceira Divisão. He started impressively and was netting four times in five matches. At the end of the 2013-14 he finished with a career-high 26 goals in 31 matches, and ended as 2013–14 top scorer.

On 5 June 2015, Vieira signed a three-year deal with top league club Moreirense.

On 27 June 2022, Vieira joined Torreense. A year later, he moved to Varzim.
