= Guirassy =

Guirassy is a surname. Notable people with the surname include:

- Abdou Guirassy (born 1989), Senegalese footballer
- Fodé Guirassy (born 1996), Guinean footballer
- Ibrahima (footballer) (Ibrahima Kalil Guirassy, born 1998), French footballer
- Serhou Guirassy (born 1996), Guinean footballer
