= Bruno Ramírez =

Bissau-Guinean footballer (born 1994)

Personal information
- Full name: Bruno Correia Mendes
- Date of birth: 10 December 1994 (age 31)
- Place of birth: Cascais, Portugal
- Height: 1.80 m (5 ft 11 in)
- Position: Midfielder

Team information
- Current team: Rodange
- Number: 7

Youth career
- 2004–2005: SC Lavradiense
- 2005–2006: Barreirense
- 2006–2009: SC Lavradiense
- 2009–2010: Fabril
- 2010–2011: SC Lavradiense
- 2011–2012: GDR Portugal Moita

Senior career*
Years	Team	Apps	(Gls)
2012–2013	GDR Portugal Moita	1	(2)
2013–2014	União Banheirense	22	(2)
2014–2015	União Santiago	28	(5)
2015–2016	Sesimbra	5	(0)
2016	União Santiago	24	(4)
2016–2017	GD Alfarim	22	(3)
2017–2018	Loures	10	(0)
2018	Oriental Dragon	13	(5)
2018–2020	Etzella Ettelbruck	35	(4)
2020–2021	RM Hamm Benfica	25	(2)
2022–2023	Fola Esch	44	(7)
2023–2025	UNA Strassen	35	(3)
2025–	Rodange	24	(2)

International career^{‡}
2022–	Guinea-Bissau	1	(0)
- * Club domestic league appearances and goals as of 13 June 2026 ‡ National team caps and goals as of 07:04, 12 March 2023 (UTC)

Bruno Correia Mendes (born 10 December 1994), known as Bruno Ramírez, is a Bissau-Guinean professional footballer who plays as a midfielder for Rodange and the Guinea-Bissau national team.

== Club career ==
Ramírez is a youth product of SC Lavradiense, Barreirense, Fabril and GDR Portugal Moita. He began his senior career with Portugal Moita in 2012, and spent his early career with various semi-pro Portuguese clubs, including União Banheirense, União Santiago, União Santiago, Sesimbra, GD Alfarim, Loures, and Oriental Dragon FC. He transferred to the Luxembourgish club Etzella Ettelbruck in 2018, and after a couple of seasons there, moved to RM Hamm Benfica on 19 May 2021. He moved to Fola Esch in the summer of 2022, and helped them play matches in the UEFA Europa League.

== International career ==
Born in Portugal, Ramírez is of Bissau-Guinean descent. He made his international debut with the Guinea-Bissau national team in a friendly 1–1 tie with Martinique on 24 September 2022.
