= Bruno Costa =

Bruno Costa may refer to:

- Bruno Costa (footballer, born 1986), Portuguese footballer
- Bruno Costa (footballer, born 1997), Portuguese footballer
- Bruno Costa de Souza (born 1990), Brazilian footballer
- Bruno De Costa (born 1938), former Canadian sports shooter
- Bruno Sarpa Costa (born 1984), Brazilian footballer
- Bruno Tiago da Costa Araújo (born 1989), Brazilian footballer
- Bruno Costa, co-founder of Costa Coffee with his brother Sergio
