= Renan Ribeiro =

Brazilian footballer (born 1990)

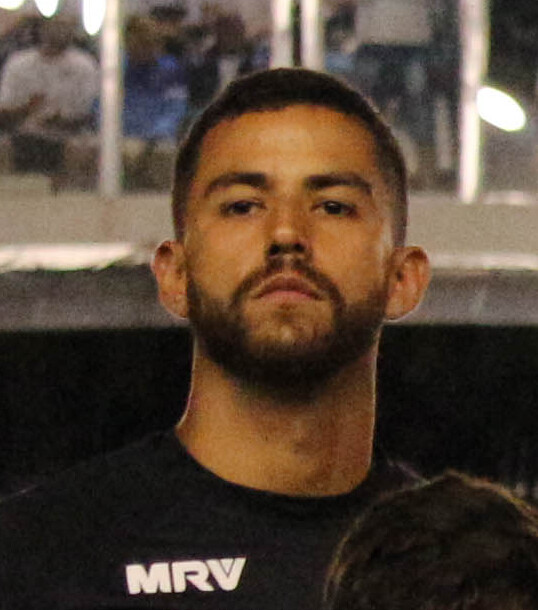
- Ribeiro with São Paulo in 2017

Personal information
- Full name: Renan Ribeiro
- Date of birth: 23 March 1990 (age 36)
- Place of birth: Ribeirão Preto, Brazil
- Height: 1.93 m (6 ft 4 in)
- Position: Goalkeeper

Youth career
- 2004–2005: Botafogo-SP
- 2005–2010: Atlético Mineiro

Senior career*
Years	Team	Apps	(Gls)
2009–2013	Atlético Mineiro	67	(0)
2013–2017	São Paulo	35	(0)
2017–2019	Estoril	17	(0)
2018–2019	→ Sporting CP (loan)	27	(0)
2019–2022	Sporting CP	11	(0)
2022	Al-Ahli	0	(0)
2024–2025	Hartford Athletic	27	(0)
2025–2026	Estrela da Amadora	33	(0)

International career
2009	Brazil U20	9	(0)
- * Club domestic league appearances and goals as of 25 May 2026

Renan Ribeiro (born 23 March 1990) is a Brazilian professional footballer who plays as a goalkeeper.

He began his career in the Campeonato Brasileiro Série A with Atlético Mineiro and São Paulo. In January 2018 he moved to Portugal, where he represented Estoril and Sporting CP in the Primeira Liga.

== Club career ==
=== Early career ===
Born in Ribeirão Preto, São Paulo state, Ribeiro began his career in the youth team of hometown club Botafogo-SP before joining Atlético Mineiro. He made his professional debut on 26 September 2010 in a 2–1 win at Grêmio in the Campeonato Brasileiro Série A, the first match under new manager Dorival Júnior.

In June 2013, Ribeiro transferred to São Paulo FC on a five-year contract at the end of his deal with Atlético Mineiro. Signed as back-up to club icon Rogério Ceni, he did not debut until 9 April 2015, in a 3–0 home win over Portuguesa in the Campeonato Paulista.

Ribeiro played just over the majority of games for the Tricolor in the 2017 national league, when he battled for his place with the experienced Sidão under manager Dorival Júnior.

=== Estoril ===
For the January 2018 transfer window, Ribeiro moved abroad for the first time, to Estoril of Portugal's Primeira Liga until June 2020. He debuted on 15 January in a home game against Porto that was abandoned at half-time for safety issues; his side ended the season relegated in last place.

=== Sporting ===
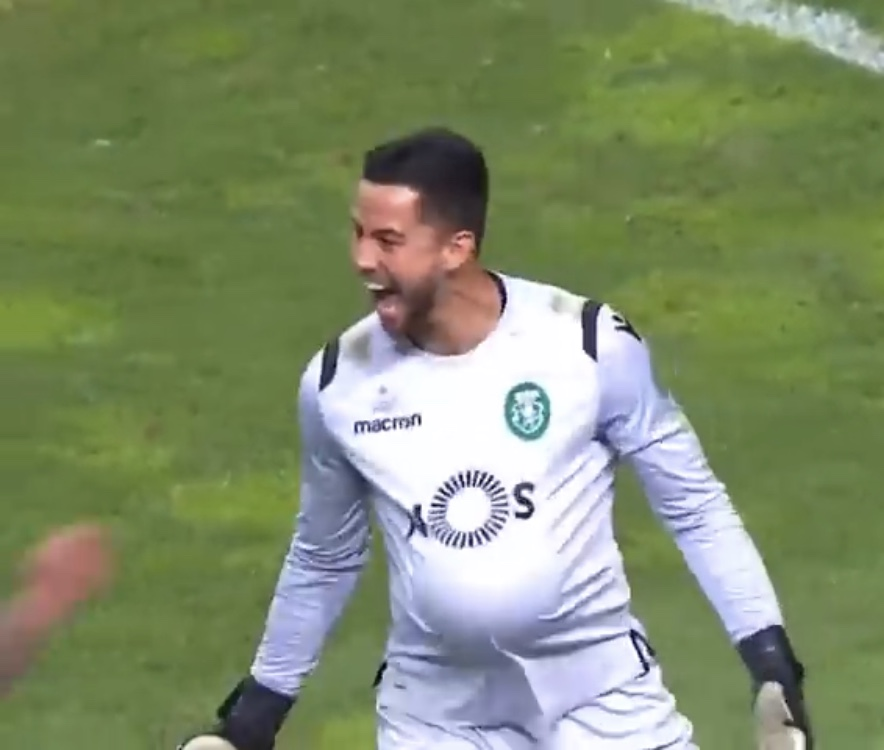
Ribeiro with Sporting CP in 2019

In August 2018, Ribeiro was loaned to Sporting CP in the same league, for a fee of €250,000 and the option to make the deal permanent. He made his debut for the team from Lisbon on 7 October as a half-time substitute for the injured Romain Salin in a 4–2 loss at Portimonense.

Ribeiro surpassed Salin and Emiliano Viviano as the first-choice goalkeeper at the Estádio José Alvalade, and in January 2019 the club activated the €1 million permanent transfer clause, tying him to them until 2023. Also that month, he helped them win the Taça da Liga with penalty shootout victories over S.C. Braga (semi-final) and Porto (final); he saved three times against the former and once more from Hernâni in the latter to lift the trophy on his mother's birthday.

On 13 April 2019, Ribeiro was sent off after four minutes for a foul on Luquinhas in a 3–1 win at C.D. Aves. On 25 May he again denied Porto on penalties in the Taça de Portugal final, saving from compatriot Fernando.

Ribeiro was sent off on 12 December 2019 in the UEFA Europa League, for conceding a penalty in the 34th minute of a 3–0 loss at Austria's LASK; the result meant that Sporting finished second in their group. Having spent the second half of that season benched for youth product Luís Maximiano, he announced in April 2020 that he wanted to leave the club.

Having not played since his red card against LASK, Ribeiro was released on 20 July 2022 with one year remaining on his contract, freeing up €1.3 million in Sporting's annual wages.

=== Al-Ahli ===
On 26 July 2022, Ribeiro joined Saudi Arabian club Al-Ahli on a one-year deal following his release from Sporting CP.

=== Hartford Athletic ===
On 7 November 2023, Ribeiro signed with the American USL Championship club, Hartford Athletic, pending league and federation approval.

His contract with the club was mutually terminated on 7 February 2025.

=== Estrela da Amadora ===
In June 2025, Ribeiro joined Portuguese club Estrela da Amadora.

== Career statistics ==
As of match played 16 May 2026

Appearances and goals by club, season and competition
Club	Season	League			State league		Cup		League cup		Continental		Other		Total	
Club	Season	Division	Apps	Goals	Apps	Goals	Apps	Goals	Apps	Goals	Apps	Goals	Apps	Goals	Apps	Goals
Atlético Mineiro	2010	Série A	0	0	—		—		—		0	0	—		0	0
Atlético Mineiro	2010	Série A	14	0	0	0	0	0	—		4	0	—		18	0
Atlético Mineiro	2011	Série A	28	0	15	0	4	0	—		1	0	—		48	0
Atlético Mineiro	2012	Série A	0	0	10	0	1	0	—		—		—		11	0
Atlético Mineiro	2013	Série A	0	0	0	0	0	0	—		0	0	—		0	0
Atlético Mineiro	Total		42	0	25	0	5	0	—		5	0	—		77	0
São Paulo	2013	Série A	0	0	—		0	0	—		0	0	0	0	0	0
São Paulo	2014	Série A	0	0	0	0	0	0	—		0	0	0	0	0	0
São Paulo	2015	Série A	9	0	0	0	1	0	—		0	0	1	0	11	0
São Paulo	2016	Série A	2	0	0	0	0	0	—		1	0	0	0	3	0
São Paulo	2017	Série A	20	0	4	0	2	0	—		1	0	3	0	30	0
São Paulo	Total		31	0	4	0	3	0	—		2	0	4	0	44	0
Estoril	2017–18	Primeira Liga	17	0	—		—		—		—		—		17	0
Sporting CP (loan)	2018–19	Primeira Liga	27	0	—		6	0	2	0	3	0	—		38	0
Sporting CP	2019–20	Primeira Liga	11	0	—		0	0	1	0	5	0	1	0	18	0
Sporting CP	Sporting total		38	0	—		6	0	3	0	8	0	1	0	56	0
Hartford Athletic	2024	USL Championship	27	0	—		0	0	—		—		—		27	0
Estrela da Amadora	2025–26	Primeira Liga	33	0	—		0	0	—		—		—		33	0
Career total			188	0	29	0	14	0	3	0	15	0	5	0	254	0

== Honours ==
Atlético Mineiro

- Campeonato Mineiro: 2010, 2012

Sporting CP

- Taça da Liga: 2018–19
- Taça de Portugal: 2018–19
