= Tiago Gonçalves =

Tiago Gonçalves may refer to:

- Tiago Gonçalves (footballer, born 1986), Portuguese football defender
- Tiago Gonçalves (footballer, born 2000), Portuguese football left-back for Újpest
- Tiago Gonçalves (footballer, born 2007), Portuguese football midfielder for Lyon
- Tiago Mayan Gonçalves (born 1977), Portuguese politician
