= António Xavier =

Portuguese footballer (born 1992)

Personal information
- Full name: António Manuel Pereira Xavier
- Date of birth: 6 July 1992 (age 34)
- Place of birth: Guimarães, Portugal
- Height: 1.80 m (5 ft 11 in)
- Position: Winger

Youth career
- 2002–2011: Vitória Guimarães

Senior career*
Years	Team	Apps	(Gls)
2011–2012	Tourizense	30	(1)
2012−2014	Braga B	25	(0)
2013−2014	→ Feirense (loan)	19	(0)
2014	→ Leixões (loan)	12	(0)
2014−2015	Marítimo B	18	(7)
2014–2017	Marítimo	67	(4)
2017–2018	Paços Ferreira	33	(0)
2018–2020	Tondela	56	(4)
2020–2023	Panathinaikos	7	(0)
2021–2022	→ Estoril (loan)	21	(0)
2023	→ Levadiakos (loan)	2	(0)
2023–2025	Tondela	45	(2)
2025–2026	Bnei Yehuda	0	(0)
2026	Académica	10	(1)
- * Club domestic league appearances and goals as of 12:12, 12 May 2026 (UTC)

António Manuel Pereira Xavier (born 6 July 1992) is a Portuguese professional footballer who plays as a winger.

He achieved Primeira Liga totals of 177 games and eight goals for Marítimo, Paços de Ferreira, Tondela and Estoril. Abroad, he played in Greece and Israel.

== Club career ==
Born in Guimarães, Xavier spent his youth at hometown club Vitória S.C. before making his senior debut in the third division with G.D. Tourizense. After spells in the second with S.C. Braga B, C.D. Feirense and Leixões SC, he signed a four-year contract with C.S. Marítimo in July 2014.

On 27 August 2014, Xavier scored his first professional goal as Marítimo's reserves drew 1–1 at home to G.D. Chaves. In December, manager Leonel Pontes called him up for his first Primeira Liga match at home to G.D. Estoril Praia, and he played the full 90 minutes of the goalless draw. A week later, he was sent off in a 1–0 away loss against F.C. Arouca, with both of his yellow cards being for simulation.

Xavier scored his first top-flight goal on 15 February 2015, a penalty in a 4–3 comeback win at F.C. Penafiel. He remained a first-team player more often than not during his time in Madeira, until joining F.C. Paços de Ferreira in June 2017 on a three-year deal with his previous employer keeping some economic rights.

On 30 July 2017, Xavier scored on his debut as the Castores won 2–1 at Arouca in the second round of the Taça da Liga. It was his only goal during his year in the Furniture Capital, and following their relegation he moved to C.D. Tondela on a two-year contract in June 2018. On 23 September, he scored both goals of a home defeat of Moreirense FC, and two months later he netted a hat-trick in a 7–0 win over F.C. Vale Formoso in the last 32 of the Taça de Portugal.

Xavier moved abroad for the first time on 30 July 2020, joining Super League Greece side Panathinaikos F.C. on a free transfer for three years. Having played rarely in Athens, he returned home on 31 August the following year on loan to Estoril. Unused since his return, he was lent out again on 31 January 2023 to Levadiakos F.C. in the same league.

On 13 July 2023, Xavier went back to Tondela, signing a two-year contract with the club. In June 2025, the 33-year-old moved to the Israeli Liga Leumit with Bnei Yehuda Tel Aviv FC.

Xavier returned to Portugal in January 2026, joining Liga 3 side Académica de Coimbra.

== Career statistics ==
As of 12 April 2026

Appearances and goals by club, season and competition
Club	Season	League			National cup (Note: Includes Taça de Portugal, Greek Football Cup)		League cup (Note: Includes Taça da Liga)		Continental		Other		Total	
Club	Season	Division	Apps	Goals	Apps	Goals	Apps	Goals	Apps	Goals	Apps	Goals	Apps	Goals
Braga B	2012–13	Liga Portugal 2	25	0	—		—		—		—		25	0
Feirense (loan)	2013–14	Liga Portugal 2	19	0	1	0	4	0	—		—		24	0
Leixões (loan)	2013–14	Liga Portugal 2	12	0	—		—		—		—		12	0
Marítimo B	2014–15	Liga Portugal 2	17	7	—		—		—		—		17	7
Marítimo	2014–15	Primeira Liga	21	2	2	0	4	0	—		—		27	2
Marítimo	2015–16	Primeira Liga	17	1	2	0	2	0	—		—		21	1
Marítimo	2016–17	Primeira Liga	29	1	1	0	4	0	—		—		34	1
Marítimo	Total		67	4	5	0	10	0	0	0	0	0	82	4
Paços Ferreira	2017–18	Primeira Liga	33	0	1	0	3	1	—		—		37	1
Tondela	2018–19	Primeira Liga	32	3	3	3	3	1	—		—		38	7
Tondela	2019–20	Primeira Liga	24	1	1	0	1	0	—		—		26	1
Tondela	Total		56	4	4	3	4	1	0	0	0	0	64	8
Panathinaikos	2020–21	Super League Greece	7	0	—		—		—		—		7	0
Panathinaikos	2022–23	Super League Greece	0	0	1	0	—		—		—		1	0
Panathinaikos	Total		7	0	1	0	0	0	0	0	0	0	8	0
Estoril (loan)	2021–22	Primeira Liga	21	0	2	0	—		—		—		23	0
Levadiakos (loan)	2022–23	Super League Greece	2	0	—		—		—		—		2	0
Tondela	2023–24	Liga Portugal 2	22	0	2	0	3	0	—		—		27	0
Tondela	2024–25	Liga Portugal 2	23	2	1	0	—		—		—		24	2
Tondela	Total		45	2	3	0	3	0	0	0	0	0	51	2
Académica	2025–26	Liga 3	10	1	—		—		—		—		10	1
Career total			314	18	17	3	24	2	0	0	0	0	355	23

== Honours ==
Tondela

- Liga Portugal 2: 2024–25
