= Pontevedra CF B =

Spanish football club

Pontevedra B
- Full name: Pontevedra Club de Fútbol B, S.A.D.
- Nicknames: Pontevedriña, Ponte, Granates
- Founded: 1965 (as Atlético Pontevedrés CF)
- Ground: Campo de Fútbol A Xunqueira; Pontevedra, Galicia, Spain
- Capacity: 500
- President: (Spain) Lupe Murillo
- Head coach: (Spain) Santiago Mariño
- League: Tercera Federación – Group 1
- 2025–26: Preferente Futgal – Group 2, 1st of 18 (champions)
Home colours	Away colours

Pontevedra Club de Fútbol B, S.A.D. is a Spanish football team based in Pontevedra, Galicia. It was founded in 1965 as Atlético Pontevedrés Club de Fútbol, and currently plays in Tercera Federación – Group 1. It is the reserve team of Pontevedra CF since 1995.

== Season to season ==
- As Atlético Pontevedrés CF

Season	Tier	Division	Place	Copa del Rey
1965–66	4	Serie A	3rd	
1966–67	4	Serie A	1st	
1967–68	3	3ª	6th	
1968–69	3	3ª	6th	
1969–70	3	3ª	15th	
1970–71	4	Serie A	16th	
1971–72	4	Serie A	9th	
1972–73	4	Serie A	15th	
1973–74	4	Serie A	17th	
1974–75	4	Serie A	20th	
1975–76	5	1ª Reg.	1st	
1976–77	5	1ª Reg.	1st	
1977–78	5	Serie A	13th	
1978–79	5	Reg. Pref.	7th	
1979–80	5	Reg. Pref.	18th	

Season	Tier	Division	Place	Copa del Rey
1980–81	5	Reg. Pref.	18th	
1981–82	5	Reg. Pref.	17th	
1982–83	5	Reg. Pref.	4th	
1983–84	5	Reg. Pref.	13th	
1984–85	5	Reg. Pref.	17th	
1985–86	5	Reg. Pref.	2nd	
1986–87	5	Reg. Pref.	11th	
1987–88	5	Reg. Pref.	3rd	
1988–89	5	Reg. Pref.	13th	
1989–90	5	Reg. Pref.	16th	
1990–91	6	1ª Reg.	8th	
1991–92	6	1ª Reg.	3rd	
1992–93	6	1ª Reg.	4th	
1993–94	6	1ª Reg.	2nd	
1994–95	5	Reg. Pref.	7th	

- As the reserve team of Pontevedra CF

Season	Tier	Division	Place
1995–96	5	Reg. Pref.	11th
1996–97	5	Reg. Pref.	7th
1997–98	5	Reg. Pref.	12th
1998–99	5	Reg. Pref.	5th
1999–2000	5	Reg. Pref.	5th
2000–01	5	Reg. Pref.	17th
2001–02	6	1ª Reg.	6th
2002–03	6	1ª Reg.	10th
2003–04	6	1ª Reg.	6th
2004–05	6	1ª Reg.	4th
2005–06	6	1ª Reg.	1st
2006–07	5	Pref. Aut.	1st
2007–08	4	3ª	17th
2008–09	4	3ª	17th
2009–10	4	3ª	15th
2010–11	4	3ª	16th
2011–12	5	Pref. Aut.	13th
2012–13	5	Pref. Aut.	13th
2013–14	5	Pref. Aut.	8th
2014–15	5	Pref. Aut.	20th

Season	Tier	Division	Place
2015–16	6	1ª Aut.	13th
2016–17	6	1ª Gal.	13th
2017–18	6	1ª Gal.	12th
2018–19	6	1ª Gal.	2nd
2019–20	5	Pref.	10th
2020–21	5	Pref.	3rd
2021–22	6	Pref.	3rd
2022–23	6	Pref.	2nd
2023–24	5	3ª Fed.	17th
2024–25	6	Pref. Futgal	9th
2025–26	6	Pref. Futgal	1st
2026–27	5	3ª Fed.	

- 7 seasons in Tercera División
- 1 season in Tercera Federación

== Notable former players ==
- (Equatorial Guinea) Kelvin Onosiughe
- (Portugal) Marcelo Santiago
- (Spain) Miguel Loureiro
