= Moía Mané =

Guinea-Bissauan footballer

Personal information
- Date of birth: 5 November 1987 (age 38)
- Place of birth: Bissau, Guinea-Bissau
- Height: 1.73 m (5 ft 8 in)
- Position: Defensive midfielder

Team information
- Current team: Serzedelo

Senior career*
Years	Team	Apps	(Gls)
2006–2008	Sporting Clube de Bissau		
2008–2010	Boavista Praia		
2010–2011	Sporting Covilhã	11	(0)
2011	Praiense	8	(0)
2011–2012	Atlético Reguengos	22	(0)
2012–	Serzedelo		

International career^{‡}
2010–2011	Guinea-Bissau	2	(0)
- * Club domestic league appearances and goals as of 18:15, 15 July 2015 (UTC) ‡ National team caps and goals as of 18:15, 15 July 2015 (UTC)

Moía Mané (born 5 November 1987) is a Guinea-Bissauan international footballer who plays for Portuguese team Serzedelo, as a defensive midfielder.

== Career ==
Born in Bissau, Mané has played club football in Guinea-Bissau, Cape Verde, and Portugal for Sporting Clube de Bissau, Boavista Praia, Sporting Covilhã, Praiense, Atlético Reguengos and Serzedelo.

He made his senior international debut for Guinea-Bissau in 2010.
