= Marco Aurélio (footballer, born 1989) =

Portuguese footballer

Personal information
- Full name: Marco Aurélio Silva Diogo
- Date of birth: 24 March 1989 (age 37)
- Place of birth: Lagoa, Portugal
- Height: 1.73 m (5 ft 8 in)
- Position: Forward

Team information
- Current team: Angrense
- Number: 80

Youth career
- 2004–2005: Santa Clara
- 2005–2006: Rabo de Peixe
- 2006–2008: Porto

Senior career*
Years	Team	Apps	(Gls)
2008–2009	Chaves		
2009–2010	Operário	2	(0)
2010–2011	União Micaelense		
2011	Espinho	7	(0)
2012	Rabo de Peixe		
2012–2013	Praiense	33	(28)
2014–2015	Tondela	28	(2)
2015–2016	Praiense	39	(13)
2017–	Angrense	12	(3)
- * Club domestic league appearances and goals as of 2 April 2017

Marco Aurélio Silva Diogo, known as Marco Aurélio (born 24 March 1989) is a Portuguese footballer who plays for Angrense as a forward.

== Club career ==
He made his professional debut in the Segunda Liga for Tondela on 22 January 2014 in a game against União da Madeira.
