= Kelvin Onosiughe =

Footballer (born 1992)

Personal information
- Date of birth: 2 May 1992 (age 34)
- Place of birth: Lagos, Nigeria
- Height: 1.87 m (6 ft 2 in)
- Position: Central midfielder

Youth career
- 2006: Pontevedra

Senior career*
| Years | Team | Apps | (Gls) |
| 2004–2005 | Julius Berger | 12 | (1) |
| 2006–2008 | Pontevedra B | 80 | (45) |
| 2008–2009 | Céltiga | 28 | (12) |
| 2009–2010 | Cerceda | 12 | (2) |
| 2011–2012 | Binéfar | 6 | (1) |
| 2013–2014 | Palloseura (OPS) | 4 | (0) |
| 2014–2015 | IFK Åmål | 7 | (1) |
| 2015–2016 | KF Turbina Cërrik | 11 | (0) |
| 2016–2017 | FC Finnkurd | 26 | (2) |

International career
| 2011 | Equatorial Guinea U23 | 1 | (1) |
| 2011 | Equatorial Guinea B | 2 | (0) |
| 2010 | Equatorial Guinea | 1 | (0) |
- * Club domestic league appearances and goals

Kelvin Onosiughe (born 2 May 1992) is a footballer who plays as a central midfielder. Born in Nigeria, he capped for the Equatorial Guinea national team.

== Biography ==
Onosiughe was born in Lagos, a port and the most populous conurbation in Nigeria.

== International career ==
In October 2010, Onosiughe received his first call for the Equatoguinean senior team and participated in a friendly lost against Botswana by 0–2 in Malabo on 12 October 2010, and he also participated and scored his first Goal for the Equatorial Guinea under 23 at the London 2011 Olympic qualification African zone against Nigeria the game ended 1–4 in Malabo on 10 April 2011.
