= Romain Salin =

French footballer (born 1984)

Personal information
- Full name: Romain Jules Salin
- Date of birth: 29 July 1984 (age 42)
- Place of birth: Mayenne, France
- Height: 1.86 m (6 ft 1 in)
- Position: Goalkeeper

Youth career
- 2001–2002: Le Mans
- 2002–2003: Rennes

Senior career*
Years	Team	Apps	(Gls)
2003–2004	Laval B		
2004–2008	Lorient	11	(0)
2006–2007	→ Libourne (loan)	21	(0)
2009–2010	Tours	34	(0)
2010–2011	Naval	27	(0)
2011–2013	Marítimo	25	(0)
2013–2014	Rio Ave	10	(0)
2014–2016	Marítimo	69	(0)
2016–2017	Guingamp	1	(0)
2016–2017	Guingamp II	4	(0)
2017–2019	Sporting CP	9	(0)
2019–2023	Rennes	20	(0)
2023	Rennes II	1	(0)
2023	Marítimo	2	(0)
Total		234	(0)
- * Club domestic league appearances and goals

Romain Jules Salin (born 29 July 1984) is a French former footballer who played as a goalkeeper.

He spent most of his professional career in Portugal's Primeira Liga, making 140 appearances for Naval, Marítimo, Rio Ave and Sporting CP, winning a Taça de Portugal and two Taça da Liga titles with the last of those clubs. He debuted in Ligue 1 at age 32, representing Guingamp and Rennes.

== Club career ==
=== Early career ===
Born in Mayenne, Pays de la Loire, Salin spent six of his first seven seasons as a senior in Ligue 2, in representation of Stade Lavallois, FC Lorient, FC Libourne and Tours FC. In 2007–08 he was part of the second club's Ligue 1 squad, but failed to make any competitive appearances.

=== Naval ===
In the 2010 off-season, Salin moved to Portugal where he would remain the following six years, signing with Associação Naval 1º de Maio who was coached by compatriot Victor Zvunka. He made his Primeira Liga debut on 14 August, in a 1–0 away loss against FC Porto.

=== Marítimo and Rio Ave ===
After his team's relegation, Salin signed for C.S. Marítimo of the same league on 15 July 2011, moving on a free transfer on a three-year deal as a replacement for Sporting CP-bound Marcelo Boeck. Having spent his first season as back-up to another Brazilian, Peterson Peçanha, he played 22 games in 2012–13, and ten in the that edition of the UEFA Europa League, which ended in group-stage elimination.

Salin signed for Rio Ave F.C. in July 2013 on a one-year deal with another season as an option, having been tracked by Sporting and S.C. Braga. He played the first ten matches of the league campaign before being dropped for youngster Ederson in November.

In January 2014, Salin returned to Marítimo on a deal until the summer of 2016. He said that he had left the Madeiran club because he thought he was going to sign for Braga on a salary four to five times higher than his previous one.

=== Guingamp ===
In July 2016, Salin returned to his homeland and joined En Avant Guingamp on a one-year contract. His maiden appearance in the French top division occurred on 21 September at the age of 32, in a 1–0 home win over Lorient. This was his one league appearance for the Breton side, though he played all three games in a run to the quarter-finals of the Coupe de la Ligue, winning penalty shootouts away to SC Bastia and Olympique Lyonnais.

=== Sporting CP ===
On 29 July 2017, Salin agreed to a two-year deal at Sporting, replacing the departed Beto as backup to Rui Patrício; it was the third time that the Lisbon club had been interested in him, after 2013 and 2016. His debut on 19 September was a goalless draw at home to his former side Marítimo, in the group stage of his team's eventual conquest of the Taça da Liga.

Salin began his second season as first choice after the departure of Patrício, but following injury against Portimonense S.C. in October 2018 he was surpassed by loanee Renan Ribeiro. The club completed a domestic cup double, with him playing all three league cup group fixtures, and the 2–0 victory at C.D. Feirense in the quarter-finals of the Taça de Portugal on 16 January 2019.

=== Rennes ===
Salin went back to his country's top flight in June 2019, signing for Stade Rennais F.C. for two years. In December 2020, having made seven appearances that season, he added another year to his contract; he subsequently tied himself to the Roazhon Park club until 2024.

Salin did not play at all in 2022–23, but was sent off on 21 August in a 2–1 home win against AC Ajaccio for two yellow cards for dissent while on the substitutes' bench. On 13 May 2023 he featured for the reserve team in the 3–0 victory over visiting US Granville in the Championnat National 2, as two of their goalkeepers had been moved into the main squad.

=== Marítimo return ===
On 13 July 2023, days before his 39th birthday, Salin returned to Marítimo. He signed a one-year deal, with the team now in the Liga Portugal 2. On 27 August, after his residence in France was robbed with his family inside, he asked the club to terminate his contract so he could return to his home country; a few days later, he announced his retirement.

== Career statistics ==
Appearances and goals by club, season and competition
Club	Season	League			Cup		League cup		Europe		Other		Total	
Club	Season	Division	Apps	Goals	Apps	Goals	Apps	Goals	Apps	Goals	Apps	Goals	Apps	Goals
Laval	2003–04	Ligue 2	0	0	0	0	0	0	—		—		0	0
Lorient	2004–05	Ligue 2	9	0	0	0	0	0	—		—		9	0
Lorient	2005–06	Ligue 2	2	0	1	0	0	0	—		—		3	0
Lorient	2007–08	Ligue 1	0	0	0	0	1	0	—		—		1	0
Lorient	Total		11	0	1	0	1	0	—		—		13	0
Libourne (loan)	2006–07	Ligue 2	21	0	0	0	3	0	—		—		24	0
Tours	2008–09	Ligue 2	10	0	0	0	—		—		—		10	0
Tours	2009–10	Ligue 2	24	0	0	0	1	0	—		—		25	0
Tours	Total		34	0	0	0	1	0	—		—		35	0
Naval	2010–11	Primeira Liga	27	0	0	0	2	0	—		—		29	0
Marítimo	2011–12	Primeira Liga	3	0	0	0	5	0	—		—		8	0
Marítimo	2012–13	Primeira Liga	22	0	0	0	0	0	10	0	—		32	0
Marítimo	Total		25	0	0	0	5	0	10	0	—		40	0
Rio Ave	2013–14	Primeira Liga	10	0	0	0	0	0	—		—		10	0
Marítimo	2013–14	Primeira Liga	14	0	—		—		—		—		14	0
Marítimo	2014–15	Primeira Liga	27	0	3	0	3	0	—		—		33	0
Marítimo	2015–16	Primeira Liga	28	0	0	0	3	0	—		—		31	0
Marítimo	Total		69	0	3	0	6	0	—		—		78	0
Guingamp	2016–17	Ligue 1	1	0	5	0	0	0	—		—		42	0
Sporting CP	2017–18	Primeira Liga	0	0	2	0	2	0	—		—		4	0
Sporting CP	2018–19	Primeira Liga	9	0	1	0	3	0	5	0	—		18	0
Sporting CP	Total		9	0	3	0	5	0	5	0	—		22	0
Rennes	2019–20	Ligue 1	4	0	0	0	1	0	2	0	0	0	7	0
Rennes	2020–21	Ligue 1	15	0	0	0	—		2	0	—		17	0
Rennes	2021–22	Ligue 1	1	0	1	0	—		2	0	—		4	0
Rennes	2022–23	Ligue 1	0	0	0	0	—		0	0	—		0	0
Rennes	Total		20	0	1	0	1	0	6	0	0	0	28	0
Marítimo	2023–24	Primeira Liga	2	0	0	0	1	0	—		—		3	0
Career total			234	0	13	0	25	0	21	0	0	0	293	0

== Honours ==
Sporting CP

- Taça de Portugal: 2018–19
- Taça da Liga: 2017–18, 2018–19
