= Lúcio Oliveira =

Santomean footballer

Personal information
- Full name: Lúcio Oliveira Pires
- Date of birth: 26 November 1992 (age 33)
- Place of birth: São Tomé and Príncipe
- Height: 1.85 m (6 ft 1 in)
- Position: Defender

Team information
- Current team: Ferreiras

Youth career
- Portimonense

Senior career*
| Years | Team | Apps | (Gls) |
| 2012–2016 | Lagoa | 24 | (0) |
| 2016–2018 | Castrense | 27 | (0) |
| 2018–2019 | Silves | 15 | (1) |
| 2019– | Ferreiras | 19 | (0) |

International career^{‡}
| 2019– | São Tomé and Príncipe | 3 | (0) |
- * Club domestic league appearances and goals as of 00:11, 26 March 2021 (UTC) ‡ National team caps and goals as of 00:11, 26 March 2021 (UTC)

Lúcio Oliveira Pires (born 26 November 1992) is a Santomean footballer who plays as a defender for Ferreiras and the São Tomé and Príncipe national team.

== International career ==
Oliveira made his professional debut with the São Tomé and Príncipe national team in a 1–0 2021 Africa Cup of Nations qualification loss to Ghana on 18 November 2019.
