= Abdou Guirassy =

Senegalese footballer (born 1989)

Personal information
- Full name: Abdou Khadre Guirassy
- Date of birth: April 12, 1989 (age 37)
- Place of birth: Pikine, Senegal
- Height: 1.70 m (5 ft 7 in)
- Position: Midfielder

Team information
- Current team: Atlético Reguengos

Youth career
- 2007–2008: Braga

Senior career*
Years	Team	Apps	(Gls)
2008–2009	Ribeirão	3	(0)
2009–2010	Nacional	4	(0)
2010–2011	Sertanense	6	(0)
2011–	Atlético Reguengos	13	(1)
- * Club domestic league appearances and goals

Abdou Guirassy (born January 12, 1989, in Pikine) is a Senegalese footballer of Guinean origin. He is under contract with Atlético Reguengos.
