= Rafael Fonseca (physician) =

Mexican-American physician and researcher

Rafael Fonseca is a Mexican-American physician and researcher. He is the Getz Family Professor of Medicine and Chief Innovation Officer at the Mayo Clinic in Arizona. Fonseca has served in numerous leadership capacities at the Mayo Clinic including as Director for the Mayo Clinic Comprehensive Cancer Center, Associate Director for the Center of Individualized Medicine in Arizona, and Chair of the Department of Internal Medicine in Arizona.

Fonseca is a Professor of Medicine at the Mayo Clinic College of Medicine and Science in Arizona and serves as a Clinical Investigator of the Damon Runyon Cancer Research Foundation.

He earned his medical degree at the Universidad Anáhuac México prior to completing his Residency (medicine) at the University of Miami. Following his time in Florida, Fonseca completed a Fellowship (medicine) at the Mayo Clinic Graduate School of Biomedical Sciences. Fonseca specializes in the treatment and investigation of Multiple myeloma.

He has received awards for his work including the Young Investigator Award in Hematology from Celgene and has published over 200 medical articles.

Fonseca is a member of the American Society of Hematology, American Society of Clinical Oncology, and American Association for Cancer Research. He is also a visiting healthcare fellow at the Goldwater Institute.
