= Silves F.C. =

Portuguese football club

Silves Futebol Clube is a Portuguese football club from Silves in the Algarve and playing in the Algarve Football Association's league in the Portuguese District Championships, in the fourth tier of the Portuguese football league system.

The team reached the fifth round (last 16) of the 1982–83 Taça de Portugal, where they lost 1–0 at home to Boavista F.C.

In the 2018–19 Taça de Portugal, Silves was one of two District FA teams to make it into the last 32 of the tournament, alongside F.C. Vale Formoso. They won all three rounds against Campeonato de Portugal (third-tier) teams: S.C. Olhanense, U.S.C. Paredes and G.D. Chaves Satélite.
