= Thierno Niang (footballer) =

Senegalese footballer

Personal information
- Date of birth: 18 January 1992 (age 34)
- Place of birth: Saint-Louis, Senegal
- Height: 1.87 m (6 ft 2 in)
- Position: Forward

Team information
- Current team: São João Ver

Senior career*
Years	Team	Apps	(Gls)
2014–2015	AS Pikine		
2015–2016	Leixões	4	(0)
2016–2017	Pedras Rubras	12	(10)
2017–2018	Freamunde	8	(4)
2018–2019	Águeda	34	(11)
2019–2020	Trofense	34	(11)
2020–2021	Gondomar	16	(6)
2021–	São João Ver	2	(2)
- * Club domestic league appearances and goals as of 4 September 2021

Thierno Niang (born 18 January 1992) is a Senegalese football player who plays for São João Ver.

== Club career ==
He made his professional debut in the Segunda Liga for Leixões on 12 September 2015 in a game against Vitória Guimarães B.
