= Nei (footballer, born 1991) =

Brazilian footballer

Personal information
- Full name: Jozinei João Machado Rodriguez
- Date of birth: 14 June 1991 (age 35)
- Place of birth: Cuiabá, Brazil
- Height: 1.75 m (5 ft 9 in)
- Position: Attacking midfielder

Team information
- Current team: Fafe
- Number: 10

Youth career
- –2012: Danubio

Senior career*
Years	Team	Apps	(Gls)
2012–2014	Danubio	5	(0)
2013	→ Miramar Misiones (loan)	11	(2)
2014	→ Noroeste (loan)	0	(0)
2014	Assisense		
2014	→ Dom Bosco (loan)		
2015–2016	CEOV Operário	7	(0)
2017	Guarani-VA		
2017	Cruzeiro-RS		
2017–2018	Fafe	28	(6)
2018–2019	AR São Martinho	27	(5)
2019–	Fafe	24	(6)
- * Club domestic league appearances and goals as of 20:31, 14 March 2020 (UTC)

Jozinei João Machado Rodriguez (born 14 June 1991 in Cuiabá), commonly known as Nei, is a Brazilian footballer for AD Fafe.

== Career ==
Nei has played for Danubio F.C. in Uruguay and had a brief spell with Esporte Clube Noroeste in 2014. Nei played for Clube Esportivo Dom Bosco in the Campeonato Mato-Grossense before joining Serie D side CE Operário Várzea-Grandense in June 2015.
