= Rodrigo Thompson =

Brazilian footballer (born 1993)

Personal information
- Full name: Rodrigo Thompson Rocha
- Date of birth: 1 June 1993 (age 33)
- Place of birth: Cambuci, Brazil
- Height: 1.89 m (6 ft 2 1/2 in)
- Position: Forward

Team information
- Current team: Lusitano VRSA
- Number: 9

Youth career
- 2009–2010: Cruzeiro
- 2011–2013: Bahia

Senior career*
Years	Team	Apps	(Gls)
2012	Bahia	0	(0)
2014	São João da Barra		
2015–2016	UD Oliveirense	24	(4)
2016	Tourizense	10	(5)
2017–	Lusitano VRSA	11	(4)
- * Club domestic league appearances and goals as of 9 April 2017

Rodrigo Thompson Rocha, known as Rodrigo Thompson (born 1 June 1993) is a Brazilian football player who plays for Lusitano VRSA.

== Club career ==
He made his professional debut in the Segunda Liga for UD Oliveirense on 15 August 2015 in a game against Farense.
