= Roniel (footballer) =

Brazilian footballer

Personal information
- Full name: Roniel da Silva Costa
- Date of birth: 2 June 1994 (age 32)
- Place of birth: Guadalajara, Brazil
- Height: 1.77 m (5 ft 9 1/2 in)
- Position: Forward

Team information
- Current team: Anápolis (on loan from Grêmio Anápolis)

Senior career*
Years	Team	Apps	(Gls)
2013	Morrinhos	0	(0)
2013	Rioverdense	0	(0)
2014–	Grêmio Anápolis	14	(2)
2014–2015	→ Porto B (loan)	25	(1)
2015–2016	→ Paços de Ferreira (loan)	21	(2)
2016–2017	→ Nacional (loan)	5	(0)
2017	→ União da Madeira (loan)	13	(0)
2018–2019	→ Leixões (loan)	22	(3)
2019	→ Morrinhos (loan)		
2020–	→ Anápolis (loan)	0	(0)
- * Club domestic league appearances and goals as of 23:50, 17 February 2020 (UTC)

Roniel da Silva Costa (born 2 June 1994), known as just Roniel, is a Brazilian footballer that plays as a forward for Anápolis Futebol Clube on loan from Grêmio Anápolis.

== Club career ==
Roniel started his career with Morrinhos in 2013. Later in the year he signed for Rioverdense. In 2014, he joined Grêmio Anápolis. He made 14 appearances for the club scoring 2 goals. On 30 June 2014, he was transferred to Porto B.

On 8 July 2015, Roniel was loaned to Paços de Ferreira. He made his debut in the Primeira Liga on 17 August 2015 in a game against Académica de Coimbra and scored on his debut.
