= Rui Coentrão =

Portuguese footballer

Personal information
- Full name: Rui Abel Maia Coentrão
- Date of birth: 25 July 1992 (age 34)
- Place of birth: Vila do Conde, Portugal
- Height: 1.65 m (5 ft 5 in)
- Positions: Left-back; winger

Youth career
- 2000–2005: Varzim
- 2005–2009: Sporting CP
- 2009–2011: Varzim

Senior career*
Years	Team	Apps	(Gls)
2011–2021	Varzim	225	(29)
2013–2014	→ Leixões (loan)	34	(1)
2021–2022	Tirsense	21	(0)
2022–2024	Ribeirão	39	(0)
Total		319	(30)

International career
2007–2008	Portugal U16	4	(0)
2008–2009	Portugal U17	9	(0)
2008–2010	Portugal U18	10	(0)
2012–2013	Portugal U21	4	(0)
- * Club domestic league appearances and goals

Rui Abel Maia Coentrão (born 25 July 1992) is a Portuguese former professional footballer who played as a left-back or a left winger.

== Club career ==
Born in Vila do Conde, Coentrão spent most of his youth career with nearby Varzim SC, while also having four years in Sporting CP's academy. He made his senior debut with the former in the third tier in the 2011–12 season, won by his team.

On 29 June 2013, Coentrão was loaned to Segunda Liga club Leixões S.C. for the upcoming campaign. He made 40 total appearances for the side from Matosinhos, and scored the only goal of an away win against Atlético Clube de Portugal on 27 October.

Upon returning to Varzim, Coentrão was a first-team regular, winning promotion to the second division in 2014–15 and playing several years at that level. On 31 July 2016, he scored twice in a 2–1 victory at S.C. Olhanense in the first round of the Taça da Liga. The following 21 May, in the last game of the season, he was sent off in a 3–0 home loss to relegated F.C. Vizela.

== International career ==
Coentrão won four caps for Portugal at under-21 level, in as many friendlies. His first arrived on 14 November 2012, in a 3–2 defeat of Scotland in Setúbal where he came on as a late substitute.

== Personal life ==
Coentrão's second cousin, Fábio, played in the same position. He was a long-time Portugal international, and his clubs included S.L. Benfica and Real Madrid.
