= Vítor Pereira (footballer, born 1985) =

Portuguese footballer

Personal information
- Full name: Vítor Manuel Ferreira Pereira
- Date of birth: 8 January 1985 (age 41)
- Place of birth: Chaves, Portugal
- Height: 1.84 m (6 ft 0 in)
- Position: Centre-back

Team information
- Current team: Verín (manager)

Youth career
- 1995–2001: Flaviense
- 2001–2003: Braga
- 2003–2004: Chaves

Senior career*
Years	Team	Apps	(Gls)
2004	Rebordelo		
2005–2006	Cabeceirense		
2006–2007	Bragança	14	(0)
2007–2008	Freamunde	11	(0)
2008–2010	Chaves	21	(2)
2010–2011	Tondela	9	(1)
2011–2013	Chaves	28	(0)
2013–2014	Bragança	30	(2)
2014–2018	Mirandela	99	(4)
2018–2022	Montalegre	83	(3)
2022–2023	Mirandela	15	(6)
2023–2025	Verín	38	(2)
Total		348	(20)

Managerial career
- 2025–: Verín
- * Club domestic league appearances and goals

Vítor Manuel Ferreira Pereira (born 8 January 1985) is a Portuguese former footballer who played as a centre-back, currently manager of Spanish club Verín.

== Club career ==
Pereira was born in Chaves, Vila Real District. He spent most of his career in the lower leagues of his country, appearing in the Segunda Liga for S.C. Freamunde (11 games in the 2007–08 season) and his hometown club G.D. Chaves (two matches in the 2009–10 campaign, team relegation).

In summer 2023, Pereira signed with Spanish amateurs Verín CF. He retired in March 2025 aged 40, being immediately appointed their manager.
