= Digas =

Portuguese footballer (born 1992)

Personal information
- Full name: Diogo Caldas Marques
- Date of birth: 31 December 1992 (age 33)
- Place of birth: Vila Nova de Gaia, Portugal
- Height: 1.90 m (6 ft 3 in)
- Position: Winger

Youth career
- 2001–2010: Candal

Senior career*
Years	Team	Apps	(Gls)
2010–2012	Candal	43	(9)
2012–2013	Infesta	24	(0)
2013–2014	Bragança	28	(5)
2014–2015	Salgueiros 08	29	(3)
2015–2016	Salgueiros	31	(8)
2016–2017	Boavista	7	(0)
2017	→ Fafe (loan)	20	(1)
2017–2018	Cinfães	30	(4)
2018–2019	Felgueiras 1932	24	(2)
2019–2020	Gondomar	20	(1)
2020–2021	Amarante	14	(2)
Total		270	(35)
- * Club domestic league appearances and goals

Diogo Caldas Marques (born 31 December 1992 in Vila Nova de Gaia, Porto District), known as Digas, is a Portuguese former professional footballer who played as a winger.
