= Jaime Seidi =

Portuguese footballer

Personal information
- Full name: Jaime Reis Simões Seidi
- Date of birth: 22 June 1989 (age 37)
- Place of birth: Angra do Heroísmo, Portugal
- Height: 1.84 m (6 ft 0 in)
- Position: Midfielder

Team information
- Current team: Angrense
- Number: 3

Youth career
- 1998–2008: Angrense

Senior career*
Years	Team	Apps	(Gls)
2008–2009	Lusitano	28	(0)
2009–2013	Atlético	81	(7)
2013–2015	Oriental	32	(0)
2015–2016	Pinhalnovense	19	(1)
2016–	Angrense	13	(1)
- * Club domestic league appearances and goals as of 12 February 2017

Jaime Reis Simões Seidi (born 22 June 1989) is a Portuguese professional footballer who plays for Angrense as a midfielder.

== Club career ==
Seidi kicked off his career with Lusitano in 2008. He then went on to play with Atlético before signing for Oriental in 2014. He made his professional debut against Vitória Guimarães B.
