= F.C. Vale Formoso =

Portuguese football club

Futebol Clube Vale Formoso is a Portuguese football club from Furnas, São Miguel Island, Azores. The team plays in the Ponta Delgada Football Association's league in the Portuguese District Championships, in the fifth tier of the Portuguese football league system.

The team qualified for the Taça de Portugal in 2018–19. On 8 September, they lost 5–0 at Campeonato de Portugal side C.D. Pinhalnovense, but were one of 22 losing teams selected to remain in the competition. On 30 September, the team hosted another third-tier opponent, U.D. Leiria in the second round. Although they lost 3–0, they advanced again as Leiria were disqualified for fielding a suspended player. On 21 October in the third round, Vale Formoso won 4–3 in overtime at home to third-tier S.C. Coimbrões. This made them one of only two District FA teams to make the last 32 teams in the cup that year, alongside Silves F.C.
