= União S.C. =

Portuguese sports club

- Full name: União Sport Clube
- Founded: 1938
- Ground: Estádio Municipal Miróbriga, Santiago do Cacém
- Capacity: 2,500
- League: I AF Setúbal
- 2020–21: 4th

União Sport Clube is a Portuguese sports club from Santiago do Cacém.

The men's football team plays in the I AF Setúbal. The team played on the third-tier Segunda Divisão B in the first half of the 1990s. Their last stint in the Terceira Divisão lasted from 2002 to 2005.

In the Taça de Portugal, União Santiago notably reached the fourth round in the 1992–93 and third round in 2018–19.
