= Ferrinho (footballer) =

Portuguese footballer

Personal information
- Full name: Nuno Daniel Nogueira Pereira
- Date of birth: 19 October 1985 (age 41)
- Place of birth: Fafe, Portugal
- Height: 1.76 m (5 ft 9 1/2 in)
- Position: Forward

Team information
- Current team: Fafe
- Number: 7

Senior career*
Years	Team	Apps	(Gls)
2005–2006	GDC Fornelos		
2006–2007	Atei		
2008–	Fafe	144	(16)
- * Club domestic league appearances and goals as of 11 September 2016

Nuno Daniel Nogueira Pereira, known as Ferrinho (born 19 October 1985) is a Portuguese football player who plays for Fafe.

== Club career ==
He made his professional debut in the Segunda Liga for Fafe on 6 August 2016 in a game against Braga B.
