= Pedro Santos (footballer, born 1996) =

Portuguese footballer

Personal information
- Full name: Pedro Rafael Barbosa Santos
- Date of birth: 18 January 1996 (age 30)
- Place of birth: Estarreja, Portugal
- Height: 1.86 m (6 ft 1 in)
- Position: Centre-back

Team information
- Current team: São João de Ver

Youth career
- 2004–2008: Estarreja
- 2008–2009: Beira-Mar
- 2009–2011: Benfica
- 2011–2014: Feirense

Senior career*
Years	Team	Apps	(Gls)
2013–2018	Feirense	19	(0)
2016–2017	→ Gafanha (loan)	34	(1)
2017–2018	→ Águeda (loan)	28	(0)
2018–2020	Anadia	49	(6)
2020–	São João de Ver	27	(3)
- * Club domestic league appearances and goals as of 4 September 2021

Pedro Rafael Barbosa Santos (born 18 January 1996) is a Portuguese footballer who plays for SC São João de Ver as a centre-back.

== Career ==
On 11 August 2013, Santos made his professional debut with Feirense in a 2013–14 Segunda Liga match against Leixões.
