= Bruno Costa (footballer, born 1986) =

Portuguese footballer

Personal information
- Full name: Bruno Miguel Guerreiro Costa
- Date of birth: 28 August 1986 (age 40)
- Place of birth: Ferreiras, Portugal
- Height: 1.87 m (6 ft 2 in)
- Position: Goalkeeper

Team information
- Current team: Lagoa

Youth career
- 1997–2002: Ferreiras
- 2002–2005: Benfica

Senior career*
Years	Team	Apps	(Gls)
2005–2006	Benfica B	17	(0)
2006–2010	Benfica	0	(0)
2006–2007	→ Odivelas (loan)	13	(0)
2008	→ Otopeni (loan)	1	(0)
2009–2010	→ Oriental (loan)	20	(0)
2010–2011	Badajoz	3	(0)
2011–2012	Atlético Reguengos	13	(0)
2012–2013	Fátima	20	(0)
2013–2014	Operário	3	(0)
2014–2016	Ferreiras	13	(0)
2016–2018	Armacenenses	42	(0)
2018	Farense	0	(0)
2018–2020	Armacenenses	29	(0)
2020–2022	Ferreiras	24	(0)
2022−	Lagoa	57	(0)

International career
2005–2007	Portugal U20	2	(0)
- * Club domestic league appearances and goals as of 16:16, 26 January 2026 (UTC)

Bruno Miguel Guerreiro Costa (born 28 August 1986) is a Portuguese footballer who plays for G.D. Lagoa as a goalkeeper.
