= Tiago Gonçalves (footballer, born 1986) =

Portuguese footballer

Personal information
- Full name: Tiago Filipe Martins Gonçalves
- Date of birth: 3 September 1986 (age 40)
- Place of birth: Viseu, Portugal
- Height: 1.83 m (6 ft 0 in)
- Position: Centre back

Team information
- Current team: Lusitano

Youth career
- 1997–2003: Académico Viseu
- 2003–2005: Braga

Senior career*
Years	Team	Apps	(Gls)
2005–2006	Braga B	2	(0)
2006–2007	Moreirense	6	(0)
2007–2008	Nelas	29	(0)
2008–2017	Académico Viseu	247	(13)
2017–	Lusitano	22	(0)

International career
2004	Portugal U18	4	(0)
2004–2005	Portugal U19	10	(0)
- * Club domestic league appearances and goals as of 06:44, 17 May 2018 (UTC)

Tiago Filipe Martins Gonçalves (born 3 September 1986) popularly known as Tiago Gonçalves is a Portuguese professional footballer playing for Lusitano as a defender.

== Club career ==
Born in Viseu, Gonçalves spend 6 years at the academy of local club Académico Viseu before joining Braga youth academy in 2003. After 2 years, he was promoted to the B-team. He only made 2 appearances for the club before playing for clubs like Moreirense and Nelas in the lower leagues. In 2008, he signed for Académico Viseu.

== Honours ==
- Académico Viseu

Portuguese First Division (1): 2012–13
