= S.C. Angrense =

Portuguese sports club

SC Angrense
- Full name: Sport Club Angrense
- Founded: 1 December 1929 (age 96)
- Ground: Municipal Field of Angra do Heroísmo
- Capacity: 950 (seated) 5000+ (standing on grass and other areas)
- Presidente Assem.: Avelino Luís Gonçalves
- Presidente Direção: Bruno Mão de Ferro
- Coach: Nuno Janeiro
- League: Campeonato de Portugal
- 2021–22: Portuguese District Championships, promoted
- Website: http://www.scangrense.pt

Sport Clube Angrense (also abbreviated as S.C. Angrense) is a multi-disciplinary sports club, located in the municipality of Angra do Heroísmo, on the island of Terceira, in the Portuguese archipelago of the Azores. The S.C. Angrense soccer team plays in the Campeonato de Portugal.

== History ==
The origins of the Sport Club have their origin in the beginning of the 20th century, when its football players first played with a ball that arrived from England (Europe), in the fields of Relvão, alongside the Bay of Angra near the walls of the Fort of São João Baptista. The first teams that developed in Terceira were unorganized, but slowly developed into a formal union of teams, leading to the creation of the Associação de Foot-Ball de Angra do Heroísmo on 4 August 1921. At that time the União Desportiva dos Empregados do Comércio (Sporting Union of Commercial Workers), one of the oldest football clubs on Terceira, that would form the nucleus of Sport Club Angrense. In the beginning this group only accepted enthusiasts linked with commerce, but later accepted a series of players who had difficulty in being recruited by other teams.

The growth in the interest in organized football increased markedly, resulting in the construction of the Campo de Jogos de Angra do Heroísmo (Angra do Heroísmo Game Field), inaugurated on 24 June 1924.

But, due to disagreements on the direction of the club, the Commercial Workers Union was dissolved, resulting in the appearance of several new teams, that included Club Desportivo Angrense (Angrense Sports Club), known locally as Os Caveiras (the skulls), and Sporting Club da Terceira.

=== Union ===
For many of its early years, the Terceira Sporting Club just practised physical education, with its seat in the old Convent of Graca, in Alto das Covas. On 22 November 1929, through the initiative of the members of the Terceira Sporting Club, these clubs merged to form Sport Club Angrense. Officially, the club was organized on 1 December 1929, and approved by the Governor of the Autonomous District of Angra do Heroísmo (on 16 January 1942). A letter from the Administrative Council, signed by President Lieutenant Gil Gonçalves and dated 2 December 1929, was published in the weekly publication A Pátria (14 December 1929) to the creation of the new club.

Apart from President Gil Gonçalves, the administrative council consisted of: Jacinto da Câmara Teixeira (vice-president), António Mendes Linhares (Tresurer), Armando Magalhães de Mendonça (first Secretary), José Elias do Amaral (second Secretary), António Lino dos Santos Ramos Moniz (Director) and José Correia Berbereia (Director). In addition to corresponding publications in O Pátria, acknowledge the teams training schedule in the city field on Tuesdays, Thursdays and Saturdays, with the season opener dated for 22 December 1929, against the Lusitânia Sport Club. This game, which would be the first of an ongoing rivalry between the two teams, was won by Angrense (4–3), and included the following players: José C. da Silva Freitas (José Baptista), Pedro José Pimentel (Pedro Brasileiro) and Mário Pereira de Aguiar; José Luís Gonçalves (José das Terras), Eugénio Pereira de Aguiar and Ildefonso Borges; Manuel Serpa Bulcão, Manuel Pereira, António Lino dos Santos Moniz, João Borges and José António Ávila. The goals were marked by Manuel Pereira, João Borges (captain of the team at the time) and António Lino (who scored twice). The first team was equipped with a red jersey, with black vertical stripes, taking on some of the characteristics of the former Sporting Club of Terceira (red jerseys and white shorts) and Club Desportivo Angrense (all black jerseys).

=== Champions ===
The importance of Angrense within Azorean football was consolidated between the 1930s and 1950s, with a total of eight district championships. By the time Angrense captured its first title, in the district championship of Angra do Heroísmo (1931–1932), the team had already adapted its recognizable red shirt, white shorts and red socks, that was comparable to the early Sporting Club of Terceira.

At the end of the 1933–1934 season, Angrense won the Azorean championship in Ponta Delgada, against rivals União Micaelense and Angústias da Horta. This championship was never recognized officially, because the Azorean tournament (which began to serve as the regional championship), for the Portuguese Cup, only began in the following season.

In the 1936–1937 season, Angrense was the first team from Terceira to capture the Azorean title, on home soil, in the Angra do Heroísmo. Game Field. In addition to winning this title, within the same epoch Angrense became a farm team of S.L. Benfica, based on Benfica's annual accounts and report (1936–37). From here Angrense began to use the same equipment and colors, including the eagle and motto E Pluribus Unum.

On 1 December 1954, Angrense commemorated its silver anniversary under the presidency of Major Miguel Cristovão de Araújo. Part of these celebrations included an honorary game with União Praiense, and solemn ceremony and speech by Lieutenant-Colonel Frederico Lopes Júnior, one of the early club players.

In May 1958, Angrense brought to Terceira the Senhor Santo Cristo do Milagres Cup, after winning a four-way tournament between Santa Clara, União Micaelense and Marítimo sport clubs.

It was in the 1960s, that Angrense achieved its highest point, when it won the insular, Azorean and district championships during the 1959–60 seasons. A large crowd was present on 3 May 1960, in the Angra do Heroísmo Game Field, to watch the game between Angrense and Marítimo of Madeira, during the quarter-finals of the Portuguese Cup. Angrense won this championship over Marítimo 2–1, while the secondary game was decided in a draw. For the first time in regional football history, an Azorean team participated in the Portuguese Cup, against the national champion and benefactor, Benfica. Benfica's first trip to the Azores for a championship, the team arrived on 4 June 1960, to the enthusiasm of local spectators and supporters, and members of the team travelled, not only to Terceira, but to the islands of Faial and São Miguel, where they were met was adulation. In the final, Benfica won 2–0 on 5 June 1960, and later soundly defeated Angrense 10–0 in the return engagement in the Estádio da Luz, Lisbon, on 12 June.

Two seasons later, after capturing the island title, Angrense once again captured the district title in Angra do Heroísmo, during the 1961–62 season.

== Current squad ==
As of 12 April 2017

Note: Flags indicate national team as defined under FIFA eligibility rules; some limited exceptions apply. Players may hold more than one non-FIFA nationality.

No.	Pos.	Nation	Player
1	GK	POR	David Dinis
2	DF	POR	Diogo Silva
3	MF	GBS	Jaime Seidi
4	MF	POR	Rúben Miranda
5	DF	POR	Gonçalo Valadão
6	DF	POR	Ivan Santos
7	MF	POR	Rui Silveira
8	DF	POR	Miguel Oliveira
9	FW	POR	Cristiano Magina
10	MF	POR	João Borges
11	DF	POR	Eugénio Fernandes
12	GK	POR	Rui Santos

No.	Pos.	Nation	Player
13	DF	POR	Vitor Miranda
14	FW	POR	Tiago Macedo
19	FW	POR	Wilson Dias
21	MF	POR	Jordanes Medeiros
22	DF	POR	Gustavo Mendonça
23	GK	POR	Délcio Azevedo
26	DF	POR	Ivanildo Reis
28	MF	POR	Pedro Aguiar
30	MF	POR	Nuno Graxinha
55	DF	POR	Pedro Ferreira
76	GK	POR	Filipe Soares
80	FW	POR	Marco Aurélio
