= Rafa Fonseca =

Portuguese footballer

Rafa
Personal information
- Full name: André Rafael Tavares Fonseca
- Date of birth: 11 March 1992 (age 34)
- Place of birth: Oliveira de Azeméis, Portugal
- Height: 1.85 m (6 ft 1 in)
- Position: Forward

Team information
- Current team: Louletano
- Number: 8

Youth career
- 2008–2011: UD Oliveirense

Senior career*
Years	Team	Apps	(Gls)
2011–2013	UD Oliveirense	4	(0)
2012	→ Bustelo (loan)	5	(0)
2013	→ Bustelo (loan)	16	(8)
2013–2014	Bustelo	19	(1)
2015–2018	UD Oliveirense	100	(7)
2018–2019	Sanjoanense	24	(7)
2019–	Louletano	5	(1)
- * Club domestic league appearances and goals as of 21:53, 17 October 2019 (UTC)

André Rafael Tavares Fonseca, known as Rafa (born 11 March 1992) is a Portuguese footballer who plays for Louletano DC as a forward.

== Club career ==
He made his professional debut in the Segunda Liga for UD Oliveirense on 22 January 2012 in a game against Freamunde.
