= Marcelo Santiago =

Portuguese footballer

Marcelo
Personal information
- Full name: Marcelo Daniel Marques Santiago
- Date of birth: March 18, 1988 (age 38)
- Place of birth: São João de Loure, Portugal
- Height: 1.87 m (6 ft 2 in)
- Position: Midfielder

Team information
- Current team: SC São João Ver
- Number: 88

Youth career
- 2004–2005: Beira-Mar
- 2005–2007: Porto
- 2007: Candal

Senior career*
Years	Team	Apps	(Gls)
2007–2008	Pontevedra B		
2008–2009	Sporting Espinho	4	(0)
2009–2010	Pampilhosa	30	(9)
2010–2011	Gondomar	21	(3)
2011–2012	Tondela	22	(3)
2012	Jagodina	0	(0)
2013	Naval	13	(2)
2013	Feirense	12	(0)
2014	AD Oliveirense	13	(2)
2014–2016	Estarreja	50	(22)
2016–2018	Águeda	54	(25)
2018–2019	Anadia	50	(19)
2020	Águeda	5	(1)
2020	LAAC	7	(1)
2020–2021	SC São João Ver	7	(0)
2021–	Beira-Mar		

International career
	Portugal U-17	1	(0)
	Portugal U-18	6	(1)
	Portugal U-19	2	(0)
- * Club domestic league appearances and goals as of 00:23, 3 November 2019 (UTC)

Marcelo Daniel Marques Santiago (born 18 March 1988) is a Portuguese football midfielder who plays for Beira-Mar.

== Club career ==
Born in São João de Loure, Albergaria-a-Velha Municipality, he played in the youth team of S.C. Beira-Mar before moving to F.C. Porto where he played in the youth teams (U-19) between 2005 and 2007. In the season 2007–08 he made his debut as a senior in Spain playing with Pontevedra CF B team in the Spanish Third League. The following season, he returned to Portugal and played the next 4 seasons in the Second Division B with 4 different clubs in each season, respectively S.C. Espinho, F.C. Pampilhosa, Gondomar S.C. and C.D. Tondela. In summer 2012 he moved abroad again, this time to Serbia, by signing with FK Jagodina. He failed to make any appearance in the Serbian SuperLiga and during the winter break he returns to Portugal and joins second level side Associação Naval 1º de Maio.

== International career ==
Marcelo represented Portugal at U-17, U-18 and U-19 levels.
