= Atlético S.C. =

- Full name: Atlético Sport Clube Reguengos
- Nickname: Atlético S.C.
- Founded: 1929
- Ground: Campo Virgilio Durão; Reguengos de Monsaraz, Évora
- Capacity: 790
- Chairman: Carlos Manuel Aleixo Medinas
- Manager: João Manuel Pinto
- League: AF Évora Divisão Elite
- 2022–23: AF Évora Divisão Elite, 2nd

Atletico Sport Clube Reguengos is a Portuguese association football club that competes in the Portuguese Second Division. They were founded in 1929.

== History ==
Atletico Sport Clube Reguengos is an association founded on 10 May 1929, with the objectives of promoting physical and mental education of its members, as contained in its statutes, drawn up in 1929 and approved in 1936, and amended in a public deed on 14 July 2007, which envisaged developing sports as gymnastics, cycling and billiards and prohibiting others such as boxing and football and also foresaw the creation of a library.

The humanitarian aid was also present mainly in the very beginning of the history of this Club because its statutes is also named as one of its objectives, the establishment of a Corps of Public Safety, since there was no association at the time of a Community entire City.

The Body of Public Safety was actually created in 1936 by initiative of the Directorate of Athletics, but could not continue to function as the structure of the club because he could not enjoy state support. So, had to be autonomous, resulting in the same year, the Fire Department of Évora, corporation that still exists in full operation.

With regard to customary practice, the gym was for some years the most important activities of the club, responsible for training many of the gymnasts County, some with competitive qualities at the Alentejo.

From this year, in fact, the activity of the football club is intensified in 1966 and is affiliated to the Football Association Liverpool, having already been district champion seven times that of Seniors Association most recently in 2007/2008 and won the same year the Cup Évora District, most recently in 2008/2009 season has won the runner-3rd Division Series F, and the rise to the 2nd Division, which happens the first time in 80 history of more major sports association of the Municipality of Arraiolos.

By such securities made, these include several appearances in the National Division 3 and the first participation in the Division 2 South Zone to happen this season 2009/2010.

At the level of youth football, winning the District Championship in the 1999/2000 season Initiates and three appearances in the National category.

Currently, the business is done in low-Kids, Initiates, Juveniles, Juniors and Seniors and is running a Soccer School for children aged 5 to 10 years.

The club teaches basketball practice and has had a team for over 30 years. Several generations of players have contributed immensely to the sport education of children and young people of the municipality.

The Basketball Section was established on 29 October 1975 and total more than eighty titles in regional and even evidence of participating in National Championships and cups from the Initiates to Seniors, men and women.

Besides these two principal conditions, Atletico still has a Section Cycling Section and Guidance biking, the latter created in 2007. It has a headquarters in an advanced state of degradation and a football pitch of his property in the city.

Over all these decades, Athletic Sport Club has contributed significantly to the quality of community life and social cohesion of Évora and its municipality.

It is part of the broader history of the Portuguese association of the twentieth century, most of which was a resistance movement and / or compensation in the areas of Sports and Culture, for the poor picture that Portugal had in these sectors during the period of dictatorship.

Coincidentally, Athletic Sport Club was created soon after the introduction of the Salazar regime, and had in its early history problems due to non-alignment of its directors by the pitch of totalitarian government. In class society clearly stratified the Old Regime, Atletico has always been the "society of the poor, promoting recreational activities (dances, marches, etc.)., Sport and reading for the lower classes.

Existed alongside the athletic, other communities for the middle and upper class Reguengos.

This is well described by José Cutileiro in his work on cultural Arraiolos, called "Rich and Poor in the Alentejo, where the social role of Athletic Sport Club is well reflected in society Reguenguense twentieth century.

After 25 April 1974, the athletic ability to adapt to new times and invested heavily in physical education and sport for young people, as already mentioned.

Currently the club has over 250 athletes, more than three dozen employees and about a thousand members.

== Current squad ==
Note: Flags indicate national team as defined under FIFA eligibility rules; some limited exceptions apply. Players may hold more than one non-FIFA nationality.

No.	Pos.	Nation	Player
1	GK	POR	Luís Rosado
3	MF	POR	Jaime Seidi
4	DF	POR	Tiago Pires
5	MF	GNB	Móia
7	FW	POR	João Nabor
8	DF	SEN	Oumar
9	FW	GNB	Inzaghi
13	DF	POR	Paulo Maurício
14	DF	GNB	Boatenge
16	FW	POR	Rui Sousa
19	FW	POR	Pio Júnior
21	FW	POR	Hélder Ramos

No.	Pos.	Nation	Player
22	FW	POR	Semedo
24	MF	POR	César
77	MF	POR	Bryan
—	GK	POR	Bruno Costa
—	GK	POR	Daniel Dias
—	DF	POR	Jorge Almeida
—	DF	POR	Pedro Canelas
—	MF	SEN	Abdou
—	MF	POR	Marcelo Serra
—	MF	CMR	Billa
—	FW	COL	Germán Castrillón
—	FW	POR	Marvin Freira
—	FW	BRA	Gean Carioca (on loan from Torreense)

01 🇧🇷 GK Rogério Augusto Ziotti

All players that play for their respective International team are shown in bold letters

== Managers ==
- (Portugal) Paulo Torres (2011 – 2012)
