= 2022–23 Liga 3 (Portugal) =

2nd season of the Liga 3 (Portugal)

Liga 3
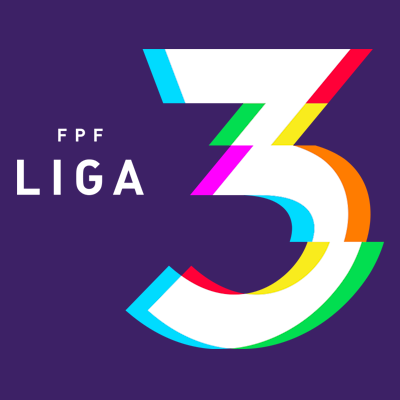
- Season: 2022–23
- Dates: 21 August 2022 – 21 May 2023
- Champions: União de Leiria
- Promoted: União de Leiria; Belenenses; Länk Vilaverdense
- Relegated: São João de Ver; Montalegre; Paredes; Vitória de Guimarães B Vitória de Setúbal; Real SC; Fontinhas; Moncarapachense

The 2022–23 Liga 3 is second season of Portuguese football's third-tier league and the 76th season of recognised third-tier football in Portugal. Second season, a total of 24 teams compete in this division for the final time, and reduced to 20 teams for next season.

== Format ==
This competition consists of a first stage with all the teams then proceed to a promotion or relegation series depending on their performance.

First Stage

In the first stage, the 24 clubs are divided in two series (Série A and B) of 12 teams, according to geographic criteria. In each series, teams play against each other in a home-and-away double round-robin system. The four best-placed teams of the two series will advance to the promotion series and bottom 8 teams will proceed to the relegation series.

Promotion Stage

The eight qualified teams are divided in two series of 4 teams, playing against each other in a home-and-away double round-robin system. The winners of each series will be automatically promoted to Liga Portugal 2 and will face each other in a neutral venue to determine the champion. The second best placed teams will face each other in a playoff, whose winner will face the 16th placed of Liga Portugal 2 for the last spot in Liga Portugal 2. On this stage teams will be divided as follows.

Promotion Series
Serie 1	Serie 2
1st A	1st B
2nd B	2nd A
3rd B	3rd A
4th A	4th B

Relegation Stage

The bottom 8 teams are divided in four series of 4 teams, playing against each other in a home-and-away double round-robin system. To account for their performance in the first stage, teams will start with bonification points, with 5th placed teams starting with 8 points and 12th placed teams starting with 1. The two bottom teams of each series will be relegated to Campeonato de Portugal for this season.

Relegation Series
Serie 1	Serie 2	Serie 3	Serie 4
5th A	6th A	5th B	6th B
7th A	8th A	7th B	8th B
9th A	10th A	9th B	10th B
11th A	12th A	11th B	12th B

== Teams ==
A total of 24 teams contested the league, including 2 teams relegated from the 2021–22 Liga Portugal 2, 17 teams that have been in 2021–22 Liga 3 (Portugal) and 5 teams promoted from the 2021–22 Campeonato de Portugal.

Cova da Piedade failed to produce valid licensing documentation to compete in the 2022–23 season of the Liga 3, so they had been relegated by the Portuguese Football Federation to District Championships. As a result, an additional team of (2021–22 Campeonato de Portugal) will be promoted to Liga 3 for the 2022–23 season.

=== Stadium and locations ===
Location of teams in 2022-23 Liga 3
Location of teams in 2022–23 Liga 3 (Azores)

Team	Location	Stadium	Capacity	2021–22 finish
Varzim	Póvoa de Varzim	Estádio do Varzim SC	7,280	17th (LP2)
Académica	Coimbra	Estádio Cidade de Coimbra	29,622	18th (LP2)
Alverca	Vila Franca de Xira	Complexo Desportivo do FC Alverca	7,705	2nd Promotion S1
União de Leiria	Leiria	Estádio Dr. Magalhães Pessoa	23,888	2nd Promotion S2
Felgueiras 1932	Felgueiras	Estádio Dr. Machado de Matos	7,540	3rd Promotion S1
Braga B	Braga	Complexo Desportivo de Fão	724	3rd Promotion S2
Vitória de Guimarães B	Guimarães	Pista de Atletismo; Gémeos Castro	1,200	4th Promotion S1
Vitória de Setúbal	Setúbal	Estádio do Bonfim	15,497	4th Promotion S2
Fafe	Fafe	Estádio Municipal de Fafe	4,000	1st Relegation S3
Sanjoanense	São João da Madeira	Estádio Conde Dias Garcia	8,500	1st Relegation S4
Amora	Seixal	Estádio da Medideira	1,500	1st Relegation S5
Oliveira do Hospital	Oliveira do Hospital	Estádio Municipal de Tábua	3,500	1st Relegation S6
Anadia	Anadia	Estádio Municipal Engº; Sílvio Henriques Cerveira	6,500	2nd Relegation S3
São João de Ver	Santa Maria da Feira	Estádio SC São João de Ver	5,000	2nd Relegation S4
Real SC	Sintra	Estádio do Real SC	1,200	2nd Relegation S6
Canelas 2010	Vila Nova de Gaia	Estádio do Canelas; Gaia Futebol Clube	7,000	3rd Relegation S3
Montalegre	Montalegre	Estádio Dr. Diogo; Alves Vaz Pereira	2,000	3rd Relegation S4
Caldas	Caldas da Rainha	Campo da Mata	5,700	3rd Relegation S5
Sporting B	Alcochete	Estádio Aurélio Pereira	1,180	3rd Relegation S6
Paredes	Paredes	Estádio Municipal das Laranjeiras	2,612	CP Champions; 1st CP Promotion; North Serie
Fontinhas	Praia da Vitória	Campo Municipal; Dr. Durval Monteiro	1,000	1st CP Promotion; South Serie
Länk Vilaverdense	Vila Verde	Campo Cruz do Reguengo	1,000	2nd CP Promotion; North Serie
Moncarapachense	Olhão	Estádio Dr. António; João Eusébio	1,000	2nd CP Promotion; South Serie
Belenenses	Lisbon	Estádio do Restelo	19,856	3rd CP Promotion; South Serie

== First stage ==
In the first stage, the 24 clubs will be divided in two series (Série A and B) of 12 teams, according to geographic criteria.

=== Série A ===
Pos	Team	Pld	W	D	L	GF	GA	GD	Pts	Qualification	FEL	LAN	SAN	BRA	VAR	CAN	SJV	PAR	FAF	ANA	MNT	VSC
1	Felgueiras 1932	22	13	5	4	32	22	+10	44	Advance to Promotion Series		1–1	1–1	1–3	2–0	2–1	1–0	1–0	1–0	2–4	0–2	3–0
2	Länk Vilaverdense	22	10	10	2	34	18	+16	40	Advance to Promotion Series	0–2		0–0	1–0	0–0	3–0	1–1	5–1	3–2	4–0	2–1	2–1
3	Sanjoanense	22	9	9	4	28	19	+9	36	Advance to Promotion Series	1–2	1–1		1–0	0–0	2–1	2–1	1–1	4–0	1–1	1–0	3–1
4	Braga B	22	9	8	5	29	18	+11	35	Advance to Promotion Series	1–1	0–0	1–1		1–1	2–1	1–0	0–1	0–1	4–1	1–2	3–0
5	Varzim	22	9	6	7	23	19	+4	33	Advance to Relegation Series	3–0	2–2	0–1	1–1		1–1	0–1	1–0	1–0	1–1	2–1	2–0
6	Canelas	22	8	6	8	27	27	0	30	Advance to Relegation Series	2–2	3–1	2–3	0–1	3–2		1–1	1–0	1–0	1–0	1–1	1–0
7	São João de Ver	22	6	11	5	22	19	+3	29	Advance to Relegation Series	0–1	0–0	0–0	0–1	1–0	1–1		1–1	2–1	0–0	2–0	2–1
8	Paredes	22	7	7	8	17	20	−3	28	Advance to Relegation Series	0–1	0–0	3–2	0–1	1–0	2–0	0–0		0–1	1–2	2–1	1–0
9	Fafe	22	7	4	11	18	31	−13	25	Advance to Relegation Series	1–1	0–3	1–1	1–4	0–1	0–2	1–1	0–0		2–1	2–1	1–0
10	Anadia	22	6	5	11	25	33	−8	23	Advance to Relegation Series	1–2	1–1	2–0	0–0	0–1	1–0	0–0	0–1	1–2		4–2	0–2
11	Montalegre	22	5	6	11	27	34	−7	21	Advance to Relegation Series	0–2	0–1	1–0	2–2	1–2	2–2	2–2	0–0	2–0	1–0		1–2
12	Vitória de Guimarães B	22	3	3	16	18	40	−22	12	Advance to Relegation Series	1–3	1–2	0–1	2–2	2–1	0–2	1–3	0–1	1–2	0–2	2–2	

Updated to match(es) played on 5 March 2023. Source: Liga 3
Legend: Blue = home team win; Yellow = draw; Red = away team win.
Rules for classification: 1) points, 2) head-to-head points, 3) head-to-head goal difference, 4) goal difference, 5) matches won, 6) goals scored

=== Série B ===
Pos	Team	Pld	W	D	L	GF	GA	GD	Pts	Qualification	AMO	UNI	ALV	BEL	SPO	CAL	OLI	ACA	VFC	FON	REA	MNC
1	Amora	22	15	3	4	42	22	+20	48	Advance to Promotion Series		2–1	2–3	2–1	2–1	4–2	1–0	3–4	2–0	2–0	1–0	6–0
2	União de Leiria	22	15	2	5	45	22	+23	47	Advance to Promotion Series	2–0		1–2	2–4	1–0	2–0	1–0	1–1	4–0	1–2	2–1	6–1
3	Alverca	22	11	7	4	30	18	+12	40	Advance to Promotion Series	1–1	0–1		1–0	0–1	0–0	1–1	4–0	2–0	0–0	2–1	2–0
4	Belenenses	22	10	5	7	38	27	+11	35	Advance to Promotion Series	3–3	1–2	1–2		0–1	1–1	4–1	2–0	2–1	6–0	1–2	2–1
5	Sporting B	22	11	1	10	28	26	+2	34	Advance to Relegation Series	0–1	0–1	1–0	0–1		3–2	2–1	1–2	1–0	2–2	1–0	2–3
6	Caldas	22	8	7	7	32	30	+2	31	Advance to Relegation Series	0–1	0–3	2–1	0–1	0–2		0–0	1–0	1–1	4–2	2–0	3–1
7	Oliveira do Hospital	22	6	8	8	29	36	−7	26	Advance to Relegation Series	0–2	3–4	1–1	1–1	3–2	2–2		2–2	3–1	3–2	3–4	1–0
8	Académica	22	7	5	10	22	32	−10	25 (Note: Académica were deducted 1 point for financial irregularities.)	Advance to Relegation Series	1–0	1–3	1–2	1–1	0–2	1–4	1–0		3–0	1–0	0–2	0–0
9	Vitória de Setúbal	22	6	5	11	31	42	−11	23	Advance to Relegation Series	0–0	0–3	1–1	5–2	3–2	1–2	5–1	0–0		2–1	3–5	2–3
10	Fontinhas	22	5	7	10	22	35	−13	22	Advance to Relegation Series	0–1	1–1	1–1	1–1	2–0	1–1	0–1	2–1	2–2		0–1	2–4
11	Real SC	22	6	2	14	27	30	−3	20	Advance to Relegation Series	0–1	1–0	1–2	0–1	0–1	1–2	2–2	1–2	1–2	1–2		0–1
12	Moncarapachense	22	5	2	15	25	51	−26	17	Advance to Relegation Series	2–4	1–2	1–2	0–2	2–3	1–1	1–2	1–0	1–2	0–1	1–6	

Updated to match(es) played on 12 March 2023. Source: Liga 3
Legend: Blue = home team win; Yellow = draw; Red = away team win.
Rules for classification: 1) points, 2) head-to-head points, 3) head-to-head goal difference, 4) goal difference, 5) matches won, 6) goals scored

== Second stage ==
In the second stage, the 24 clubs were divided in 2 promotion series (Serie 1 and 2) of 4 teams and 4 relegation series (Serie 1, 2, 3 and 4) of 4 teams.

=== Promotion series ===
==== Serie 1 ====
Pos	Team	Pld	W	D	L	GF	GA	GD	Pts	Promotion or qualification	UNI	BRA	ALV	FEL
1	União de Leiria (C, P)	6	5	0	1	12	4	+8	15	Promotion to Liga Portugal 2		1–0	3–1	4–1
2	Braga B	6	3	0	3	5	5	0	9	Advance to Playoff	1–0		2–0	1–0
3	Alverca	6	2	1	3	7	9	−2	7		1–2	2–1		2–0
4	Felgueiras 1932	6	1	1	4	4	10	−6	4		0–2	2–0	1–1	

Updated to match(es) played on 6 May 2023. Source: FPF.pt
Legend: Blue = home team win; Yellow = draw; Red = away team win.
Rules for classification: 1) points, 2) head-to-head points, 3) head-to-head goal difference, 4) goal difference, 5) matches won, 6) goals scored
(C) Champions; (P) Promoted

==== Serie 2 ====
Pos	Team	Pld	W	D	L	GF	GA	GD	Pts	Promotion or qualification	BEL	LAN	SAN	AMO
1	Belenenses (P)	6	3	2	1	8	4	+4	11 (Note: Belenenses were ranked ahead of Länk Vilaverdense on head-to-head points: Belenenses 2–0 Länk Vilaverdense, Länk Vilaverdense 0–0 Belenenses.)	Promotion to Liga Portugal 2		2–0	0–0	3–0
2	Länk Vilaverdense (O, P)	6	3	2	1	9	2	+7	11	Advance to Playoff	0–0		2–0	5–0
3	Sanjoanense	6	2	2	2	4	6	−2	8		1–3	0–0		1–0
4	Amora	6	1	0	5	4	13	−9	3		3–0	0–2	1–2	

Updated to match(es) played on 6 May 2023. Source: FPF.pt
Legend: Blue = home team win; Yellow = draw; Red = away team win.
Rules for classification: 1) points, 2) head-to-head points, 3) head-to-head goal difference, 4) goal difference, 5) matches won, 6) goals scored
(O) Play-off winners; (P) Promoted

=== Relegation series ===
==== Serie 1 ====
Pos	Team	Pld	W	D	L	GF	GA	GD	Pts	Relegation	VAR	FAF	SJV	MNT
1	Varzim	6	2	2	2	6	6	0	16			1–0	1–1	0–1
2	Fafe	6	3	2	1	9	6	+3	15		2–2		0–0	4–2
3	São João de Ver (R)	6	2	2	2	6	6	0	14	Relegation to Campeonato de Portugal	2–1	1–2		2–1
4	Montalegre (R)	6	2	0	4	5	8	−3	8	Relegation to Campeonato de Portugal	0–1	0–1	1–0	

Updated to match(es) played on 6 May 2023. Source: FPF.pt
Legend: Blue = home team win; Yellow = draw; Red = away team win.
Rules for classification: 1) points, 2) head-to-head points, 3) head-to-head goal difference, 4) goal difference, 5) matches won, 6) goals scored
(R) Relegated

==== Serie 2 ====
Pos	Team	Pld	W	D	L	GF	GA	GD	Pts	Relegation	CAN	ANA	PAR	VSC
1	Canelas 2010	6	4	2	0	11	6	+5	21			3–1	2–1	1–0
2	Anadia	6	2	2	2	10	10	0	11 (Note: Anadia were ranked ahead of Paredes on head-to-head points: Anadia 2–1 Paredes, Paredes 1–1 Anadia.)		1–2		2–1	2–0
3	Paredes (R)	6	1	3	2	6	7	−1	11	Relegation to Campeonato de Portugal	2–2	1–1		0–0
4	Vitória de Guimarães B (R)	6	0	3	3	4	8	−4	4	Relegation to Campeonato de Portugal	1–1	3–3	0–1	

Updated to match(es) played on 6 May 2023. Source: FPF.pt
Legend: Blue = home team win; Yellow = draw; Red = away team win.
Rules for classification: 1) points, 2) head-to-head points, 3) head-to-head goal difference, 4) goal difference, 5) matches won, 6) goals scored
(R) Relegated

==== Serie 3 ====
Pos	Team	Pld	W	D	L	GF	GA	GD	Pts	Relegation	SPO	OLI	VFC	REA
1	Sporting B	6	2	2	2	8	8	0	16			1–2	1–1	2–1
2	Oliveira do Hospital	6	3	0	3	8	8	0	15		1–3		2–0	1–0
3	Vitória de Setúbal (R)	6	3	2	1	7	6	+1	15	Relegation to Campeonato de Portugal	1–1	2–1		1–0
4	Real SC (R)	6	2	0	4	6	7	−1	8	Relegation to Campeonato de Portugal	2–0	2–1	1–2	

Updated to match(es) played on 6 May 2023. Source: FPF.pt
Legend: Blue = home team win; Yellow = draw; Red = away team win.
Rules for classification: 1) points, 2) head-to-head points, 3) head-to-head goal difference, 4) goal difference, 5) matches won, 6) goals scored
(R) Relegated

==== Serie 4 ====
Pos	Team	Pld	W	D	L	GF	GA	GD	Pts	Relegation	ACA	CAL	FON	MNC
1	Académica	6	4	1	1	8	3	+5	18			2–1	1–0	0–1
2	Caldas	6	2	1	3	9	8	+1	14		0–2		3–0	2–0
3	Fontinhas (R)	6	2	2	2	6	8	−2	11	Relegation to Campeonato de Portugal	1–1	3–2		0–0
4	Moncarapachense (R)	6	1	2	3	3	7	−4	6	Relegation to Campeonato de Portugal	0–2	1–1	1–2	

Updated to match(es) played on 6 May 2023. Source: FPF.pt
Legend: Blue = home team win; Yellow = draw; Red = away team win.
Rules for classification: 1) points, 2) head-to-head points, 3) head-to-head goal difference, 4) goal difference, 5) matches won, 6) goals scored
(R) Relegated

== Third stage ==
=== Third place playoff ===
==== First leg ====
14 May 2023
15:00

Braga B	0–2	Länk Vilaverdense

Complexo Desportivo do Fão, Apúlia e Fão

==== Second leg ====
21 May 2023
17:00

Länk Vilaverdense	2–1	Braga B

Campo Cruz do Reguengo
Vila Verde

Länk Vilaverdense advances to Promotion play-offs.

=== Championship final ===
20 May 2023
16:15

União de Leiria	1–0	Belenenses

Estádio Nacional, Jamor

== Number of teams by district ==
Rank	District Football Associations	Number	Teams
1	Braga	4	Braga B, Fafe, Länk Vilaverdense and Vitória de Guimarães B
1	Lisbon	4	Alverca, Belenenses, Real SC and Sporting B
1	Porto	4	Canelas 2010, Felgueiras 1932, Paredes and Varzim
4	Aveiro	3	Anadia, Sanjoanense and São João de Ver
5	Coimbra	2	Académica and Oliveira do Hospital
5	Leiria	2	Caldas and União de Leiria
5	Setúbal	2	Amora and Vitória de Setúbal
8	Angra do Heroísmo	1	Fontinhas
8	Faro	1	Moncarapachense
8	Vila Real	1	Montalegre

== Top scorers ==
As of 6 May 2023

Rank	Player	Club	Goals
1	(Portugal) Zequinha	Vitória de Setúbal	15
2	(Brazil) Edmilson	Länk Vilaverdense	12
2	(Brazil) Jair	União de Leiria	12
2	(Portugal) Fausto Lourenço	Anadia	12
4	(Portugal) Rui Batalha	Oliveira do Hospital	11
4	(Portugal) Gonçalo Gregório	União de Leiria	11
7	(Brazil) Paulo Marcelo	Amora	10
7	(Portugal) Adilson Silva	Real SC	10
7	(Portugal) Rui Areias	Varzim	10
10	(Portugal) João Costa	Belenenses	9
10	(Cape Verde) Clé	Belenenses	9
10	(Portugal) André Lacximicant	Braga B	9
10	(Brazil) Patrick	Vitória de Guimarães B Oliveira do Hospital	9
10	(Portugal) Bruninho	Montalegre	9
10	(Portugal) Joel Silva	Sanjoanense	9
