= Vítor Bastos =

Portuguese footballer (born 1990)

Personal information
- Full name: Vítor Manuel Santos Bastos
- Date of birth: 1 May 1990 (age 36)
- Place of birth: Gondar, Portugal
- Height: 1.90 m (6 ft 3 in)
- Position: Centre-back

Youth career
- 2003–2006: Vizela
- 2006–2009: Vitória Guimarães

Senior career*
Years	Team	Apps	(Gls)
2008–2013	Vitória Guimarães	1	(0)
2009–2010	→ Vizela (loan)	17	(0)
2010–2011	→ Freamunde (loan)	13	(0)
2011–2012	→ Atlético (loan)	24	(0)
2012–2013	Vitória Guimarães B	30	(0)
2013–2015	Olhanense	19	(0)
2015	Istra 1961	12	(0)
2015–2016	Red Star	1	(0)
2017–2018	Canelas	24	(1)
2018–2019	Sanjoanense	22	(1)
2019–2020	Oliveirense	22	(0)
2020–2024	Canelas	94	(0)
2024–2025	Valadares Gaia	27	(1)
Total		306	(3)

International career
2010	Portugal U20	3	(0)
2011–2012	Portugal U21	6	(0)
- * Club domestic league appearances and goals

Vítor Manuel Santos Bastos (born 1 May 1990) is a Portuguese former professional footballer who played as a centre-back.

== Club career ==
Born in the village of Gondar in Guimarães, Bastos appeared in one Primeira Liga during his spell with local club Vitória Sport Clube, the 2–0 away loss against Sporting CP on 30 November 2008 where he played the first 45 minutes as a last-year junior. He went on to serve three consecutive loan spells, with F.C. Vizela in the third division and S.C. Freamunde and Atlético Clube de Portugal in the Segunda Liga.

Returned to his parent club for 2012–13, Bastos was assigned to the reserves in the second tier. After his release in March 2013 he represented S.C. Olhanense, being sparingly used and being relegated from the top flight in his first season. In January 2015, he left the Algarve and signed a one-and-a-half-year contract with NK Istra 1961 from the Croatian Football League.

In the summer of 2015, Bastos joined French Ligue 2 team Red Star F.C. alongside compatriot Rui Sampaio. His competitive input consisted of the 5–1 league home defeat to Valenciennes FC on 28 August.

== International career ==
Bastos collected 18 caps for Portugal at youth level. He made his debut for the under-21s on 28 March 2011, playing the entire 1–1 friendly draw with Denmark at the Estádio Municipal Sérgio Conceição.
