= São Gião Radio Telescope =

Radio telescope in Portugal

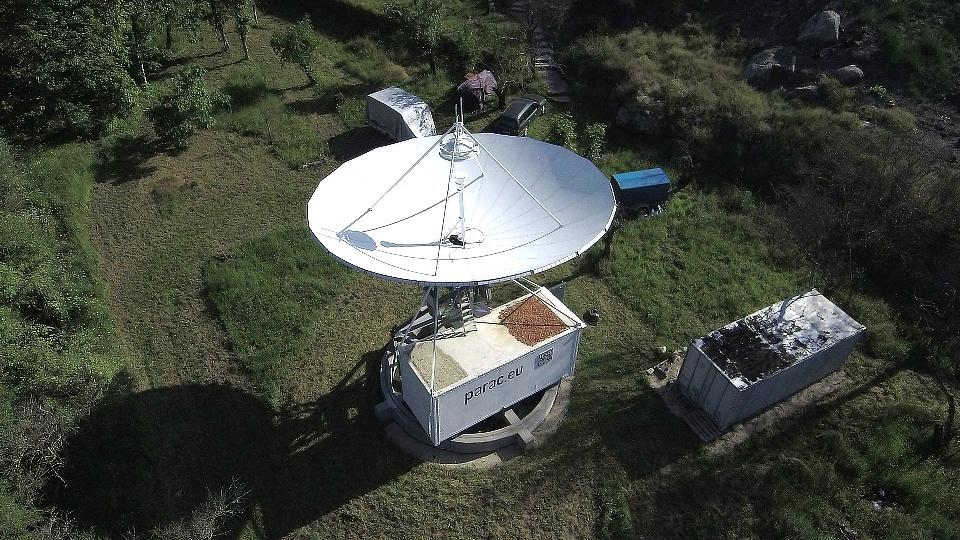
- São Gião Radio Telescope
- Location(s): São Gião, Oliveira do Hospital, Coimbra District, Portugal
- Coordinates: 40°19′49″N 7°48′47″W
- Altitude: 704 m (2,310 ft)
- Diameter: 9.3 m (30 ft 6 in)
- Website: www.parac.eu
- Location of São Gião Radio Telescope
- Related media on Commons

The São Gião Radio Telescope is situated in the parish of São Gião, Portugal. It was constructed in 2015, with first light in December 2015. The gregorian telescope has a diameter of 9.3 m. As of 2019 it is the biggest radio telescope in mainland Portugal. Two 3 phase motors drive the azimuth and elevation (or altitude) servo systems with an accuracy of 0.01 degree. The main reflector has a solid reflector surface that makes it suitable for observations of high frequencies up to 22 GHz.

It is used to observe the hydrogen line from our galaxy and maser signals from star-forming regions and late evolution AGB or OH/IR stars. The frequencies used for the hydrogen line is 1.42 GHz and maser signals are measured on 1.612, and 12 GHz The data results obtained with the telescope were presented on EUCARA 2016 Dwingeloo Netherlands and on the ASTROFESTA 2018 in Constancia Portugal. The telescope data and methods are also referenced by universities like the Western Kentucky University, and societies like Ofiuco and the Society of Amateur Radio Astronomers.

A report from the Correio da Beira Serra newspaper about the São Gião radio telescope, can be consulted here.
