= Vila Pouca da Beira =

Coordinates: 40°18′N 7°55′W

Vila Pouca da Beira is a village and former civil parish in the municipality of Oliveira do Hospital, Portugal. In 2013, the parish merged into the new parish Santa Ovaia e Vila Pouca da Beira. It has a surface area of 5.12 km^{2} and 383 inhabitants (2001). Its population density is 74,8 inhabitants/km^{2}.

Vila Pouca was an independent municipality until the beginning of the 19th century. In 1801, when it became a parish of Avô, it had 402 inhabitants. The municipality of Avô, and with it Vila Pouca, merged into the municipality of Oliveira do Hospital in 1855.

A historical landmark in Vila Pouca is an 18th-century former convent, the Convento do Desagravo do Santíssimo Sacramento ("Convent of the Soothing of the Blessed Sacrament"). When the last nun of the convent died in the beginning of the 19th century the convent became a military hospital. It ultimately became a pousada around the beginning of the 21st century.

Convento do Desagravo do Santíssimo Sacramento

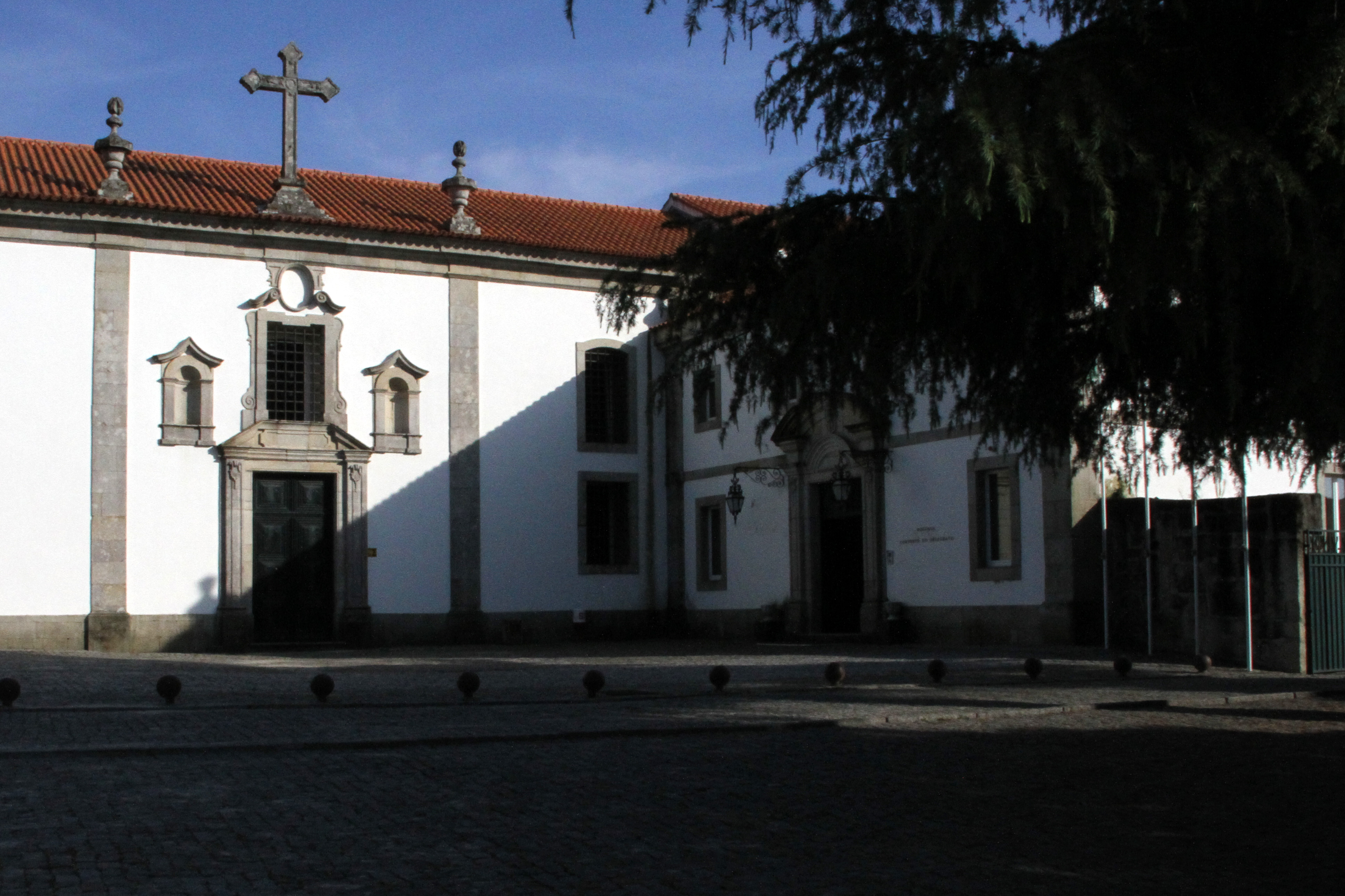
Convento

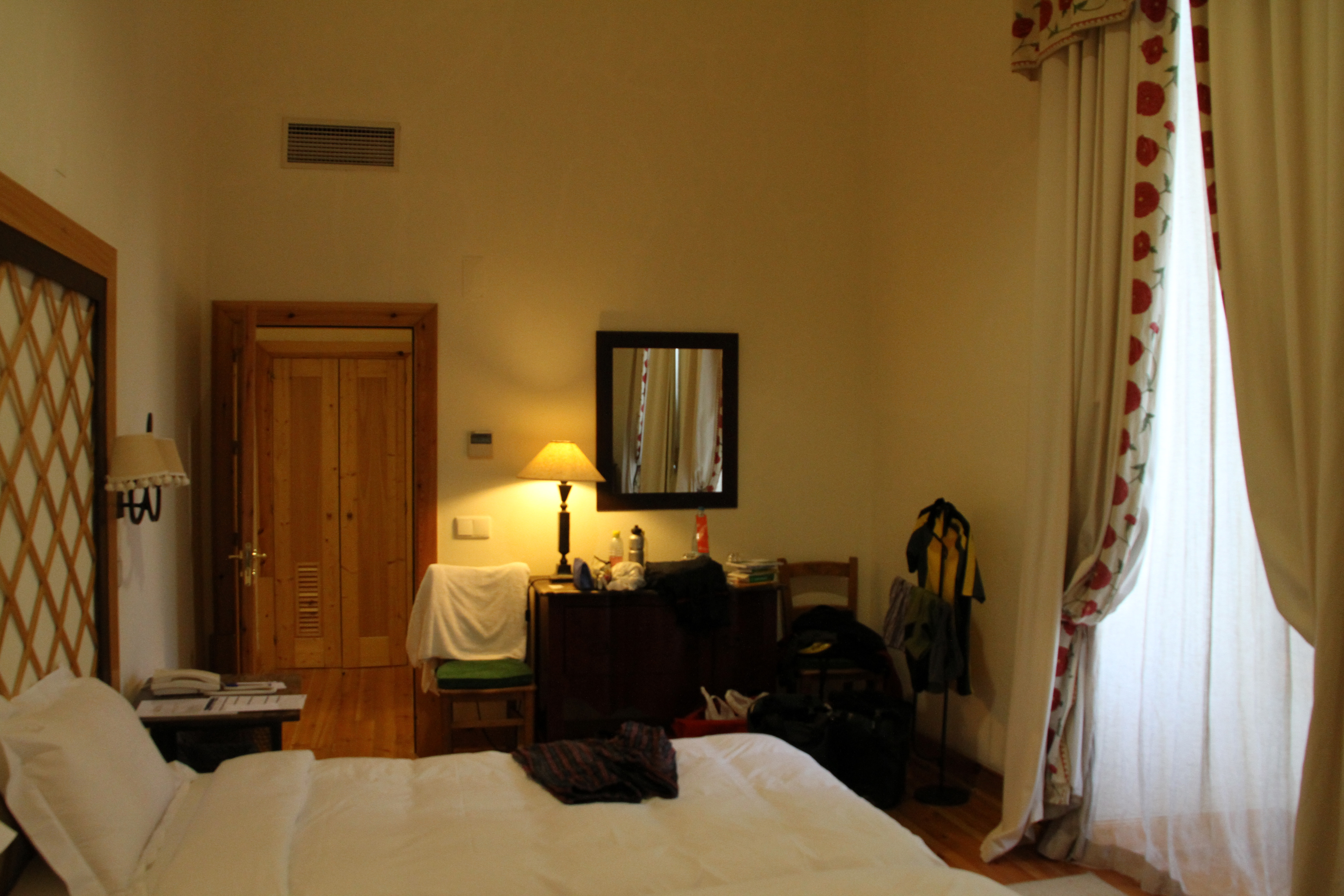
Room in Pousada

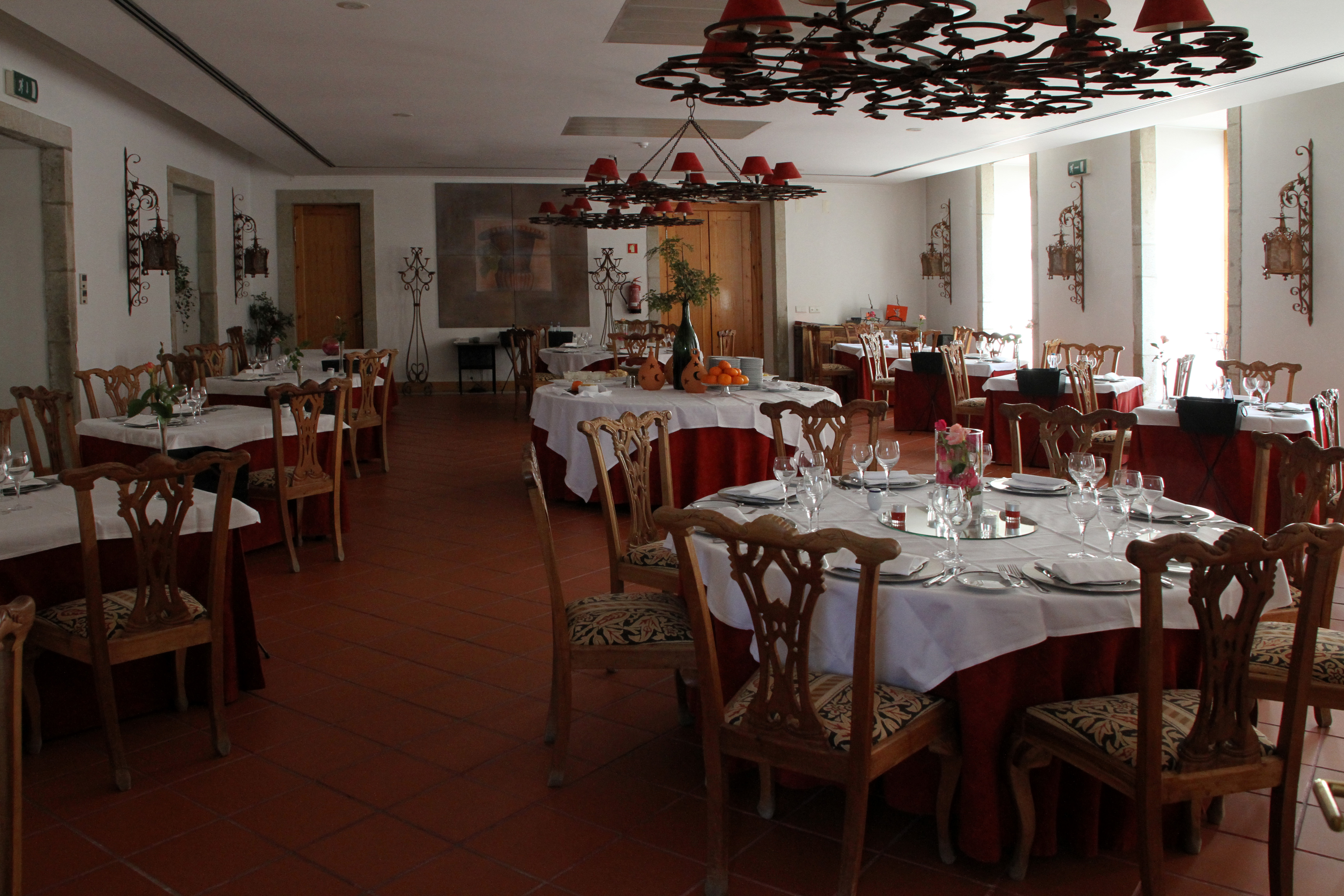
Restaurant of Pousada

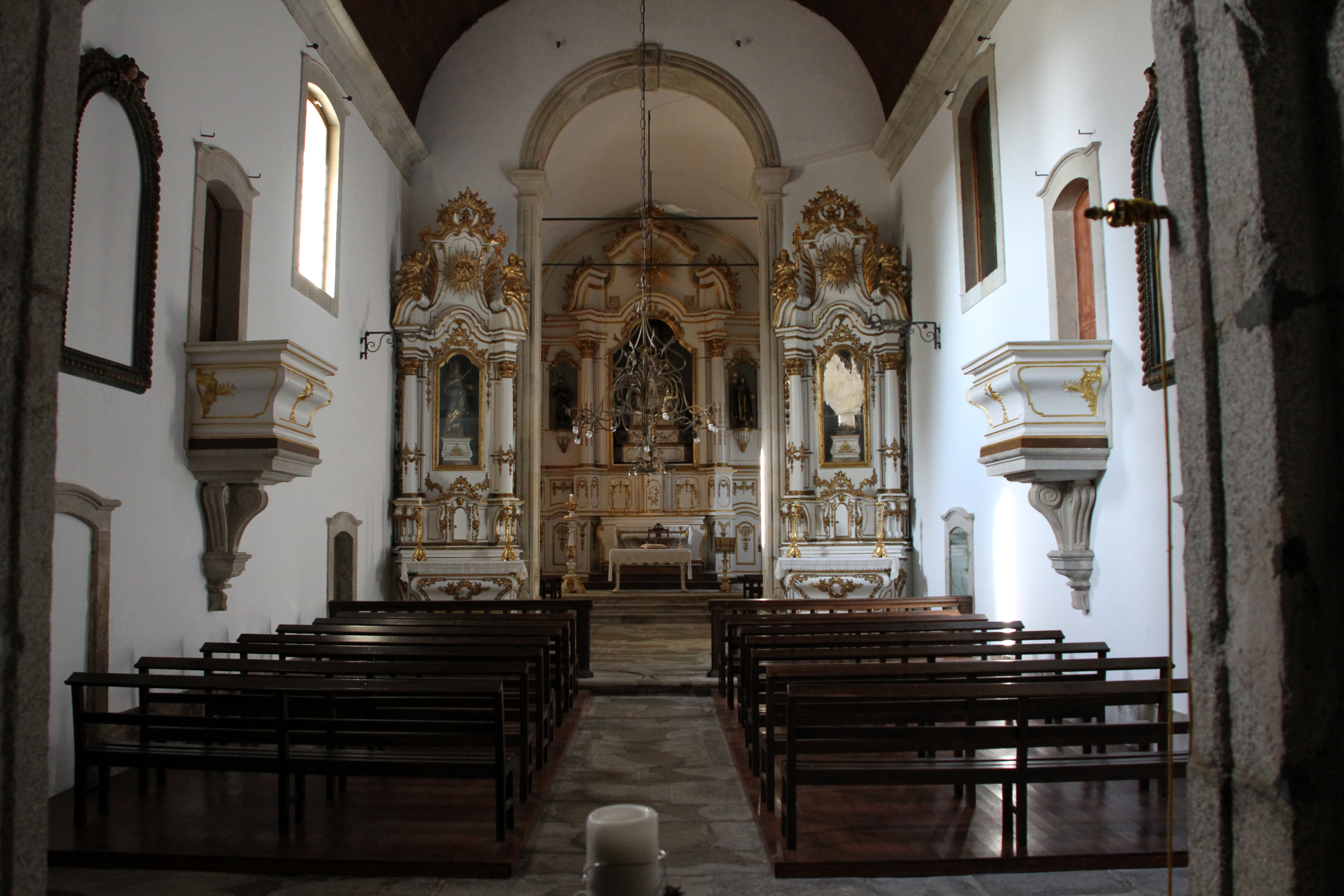
Church

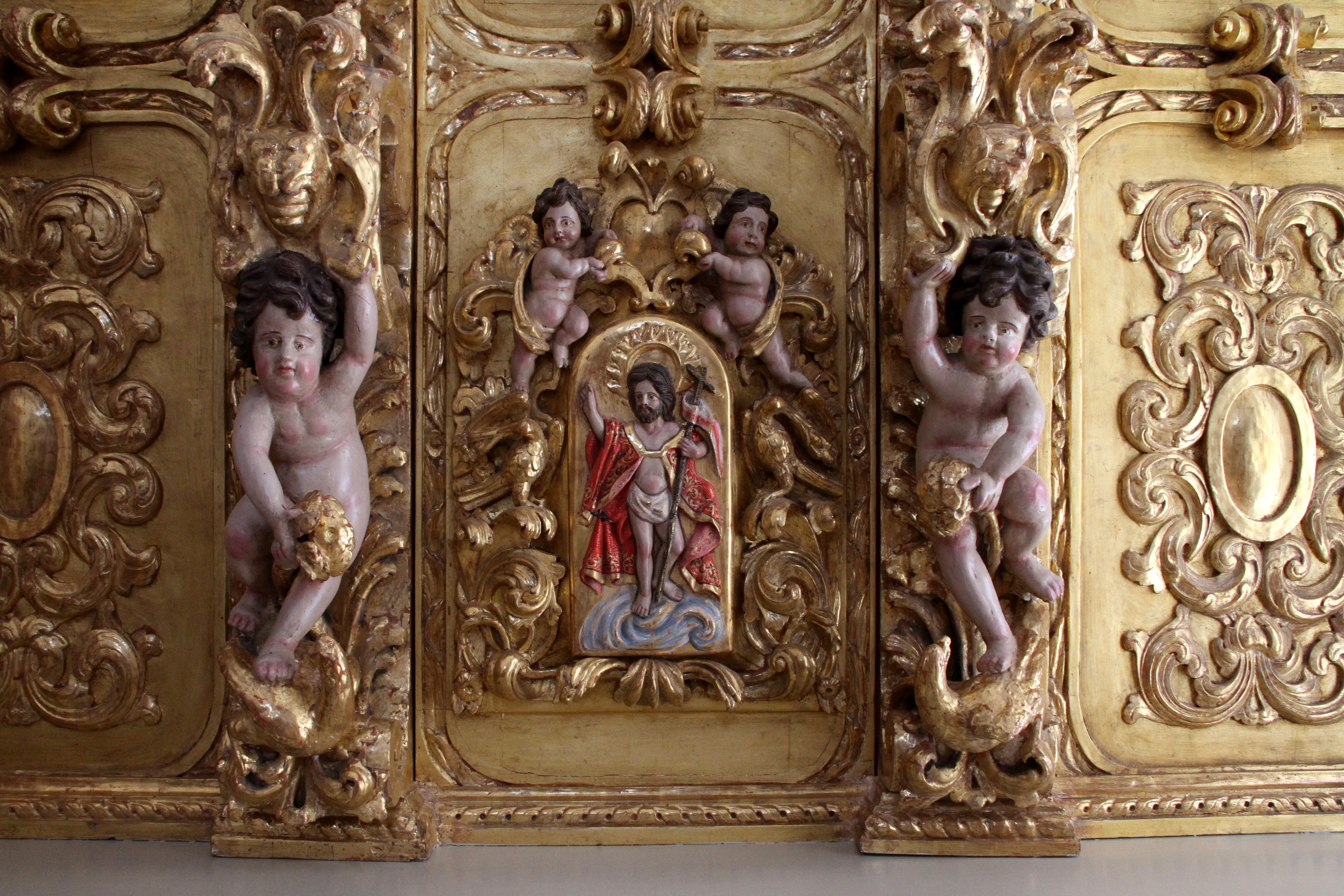
Part of an altar

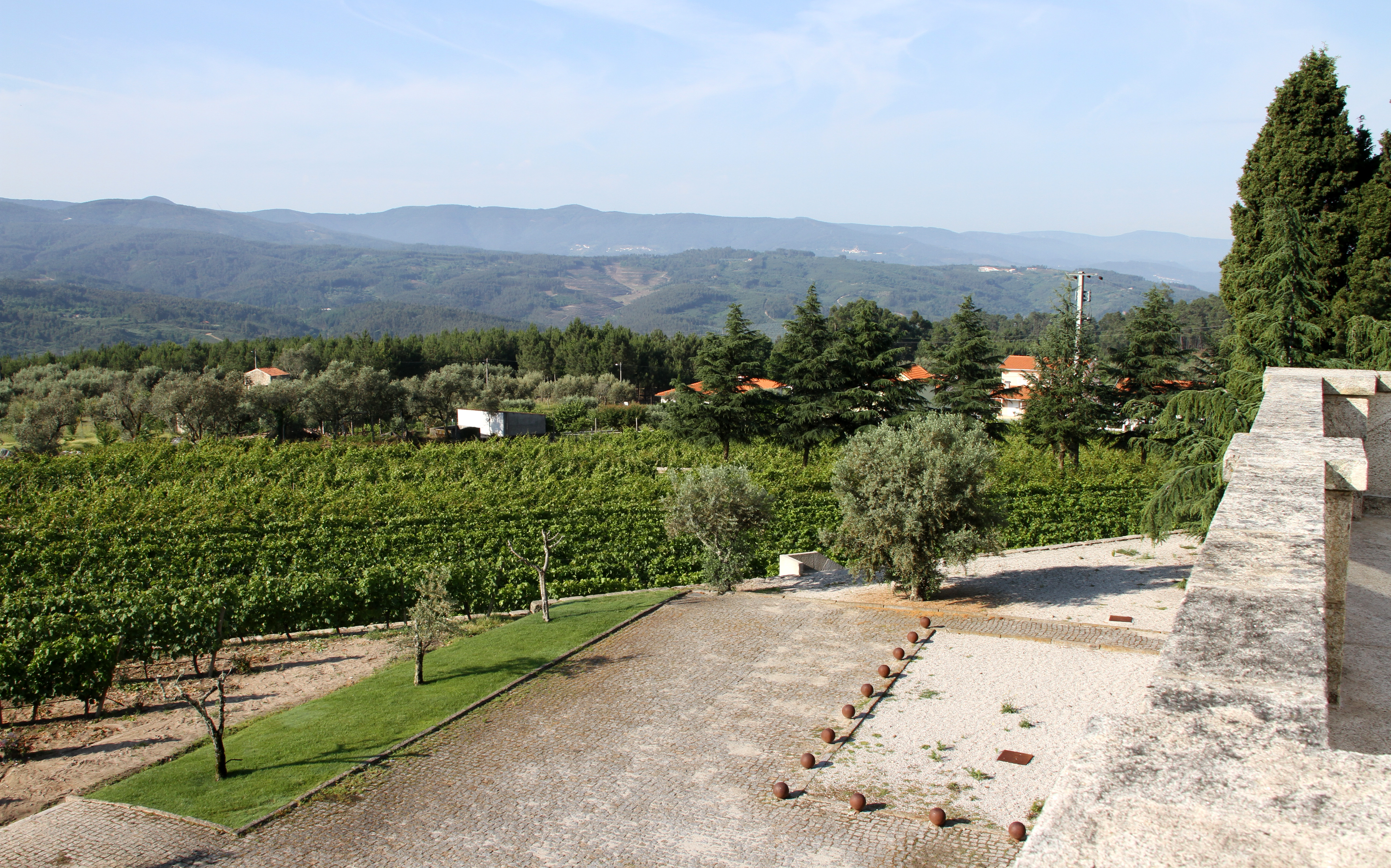
View from terrace

== Persons ==
Dutch writer Gerrit Komrij resided in the village.
