= Vila Pouca =

Vila Pouca may refer to the following places in Portugal:

- Vila Pouca da Beira, municipality in the district of Vila Real
- Vila Pouca de Aguiar, village and former civil parish in the municipality of Oliveira do Hospital
