= Onyeka Lucky =

Nigerian footballer

Personal information
- Full name: Onyeka Lucky Osemene
- Date of birth: 18 June 1995 (age 31)
- Height: 1.88 m (6 ft 2 in)
- Position: Forward

Team information
- Current team: SV Wilhelmshaven
- Number: 99

Youth career
- 2013–2014: Leixões

Senior career*
Years	Team	Apps	(Gls)
2014	Salgueiros	14	(9)
2015	Ribeirão	6	(0)
2015–2016	Braga B	1	(0)
2015–2016	→ Trofense (loan)	16	(4)
2017	Sporting Covilhã	9	(3)
2017	Teuta Durrës	9	(0)
2018	Sporting Covilhã	19	(0)
2019–2020	Leiria	29	(4)
2020–2022	Canelas	45	(12)
2022–2023	Varzim	16	(1)
2023	Paredes		
2024	Canelas 2010		
2024–2025	TSV Albeck		
2025–	SV Wilhelmshaven	9	(3)
- * Club domestic league appearances and goals as of 15 November 2025

Onyeka Lucky Osemene (born 18 June 1995) is a Nigerian football player who plays for German Oberliga Niedersachsen club SV Wilhelmshaven as a forward.

In a career spent mostly in Portugal, he played 29 games and scored three goals in the second tier with Braga B and Covilhã (two spells), but spent most of his seasons at a lower level. He also played briefly in the Albanian Kategoria Superiore with Teuta Durrës in 2017.

== Club career ==
Lucky played in the youth ranks of Leixões S.C. before starting his senior career in Portugal's third tier with S.C. Salgueiros and G.D. Ribeirão. He made his professional debut in the Segunda Liga for S.C. Braga B on 8 August 2015 in a 2–2 draw at G.D. Chaves, as a 73rd-minute substitute for Carlos Fortes.

After a loan in the third tier at C.D. Trofense, Lucky returned to the second level on 9 January 2017 by signing for Filipe Gouveia's S.C. Covilhã. On his debut five days later, he came on at half time for defender Zé Pedro and scored his first professional goal to equalise in a 3–2 home loss to F.C. Penafiel. After a brief spell at KF Teuta Durrës in the Albanian Kategoria Superiore, he returned to Covilhã in January 2018, and rescinded his contract a year later.

On 23 January 2019, Lucky signed for U.D. Leiria in the third-tier Campeonato de Portugal. Thirteen months later, he terminated his deal due to alleged unpaid wages and signed for CF Canelas 2010 in the same league. The team won promotion to the new Liga 3 in 2020–21, where he scored a career-best eight goals in 21 games in his first season, prompting a move to Varzim S.C. in July 2022.
