= Church of São Gião =

- Parochial Church of St. Julian
- Igreja de São Gião
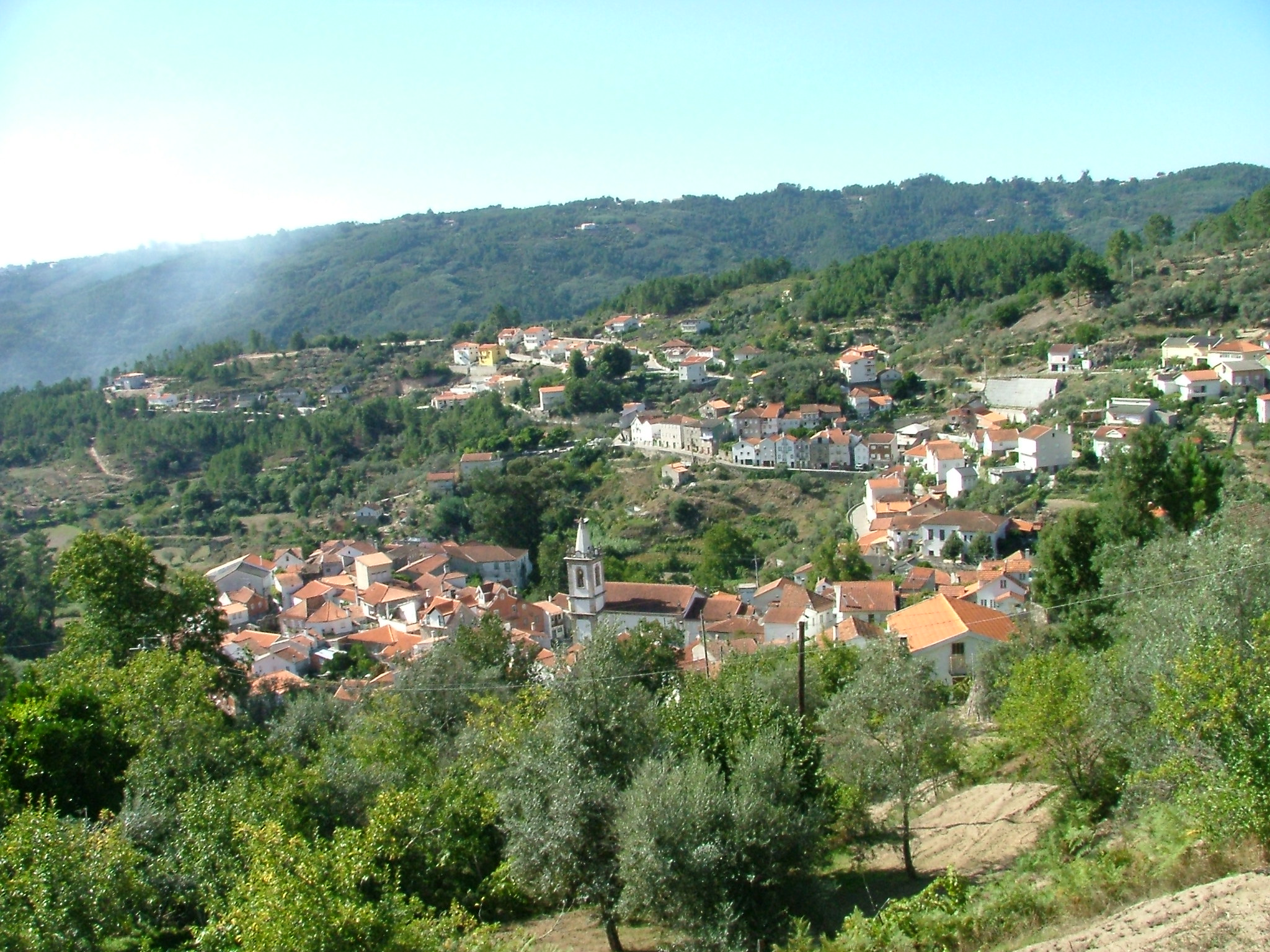
- A view of the town of São Gião, with the church peaking in the middle
- Church of São Gião
- 40°20′12.9″N 7°47′57.3″W
- Location: Coimbra, Pinhal Interior Norte, Centro
- Country: Portugal
- Denomination: Roman Catholic

History
- Dedication: Julian of Antioch

Architecture
- Style: Baroque, Roccoco

Administration
- Diocese: Diocese of Guarda

A Church of São Gião (Portuguese: Igreja Paroquial de São Gião/Igreja de São Gião) is an 18th-century church in the civil parish of São Gião, in the municipality of Oliveira do Hospital, in the Portuguese district of Coimbra. Classified as a national monument since 1910, it is locally known as the Cathedral das Beiras (Cathedral of Beiras), although unrecognized by IGESPAR or the Diocese of Guarda.

== History ==
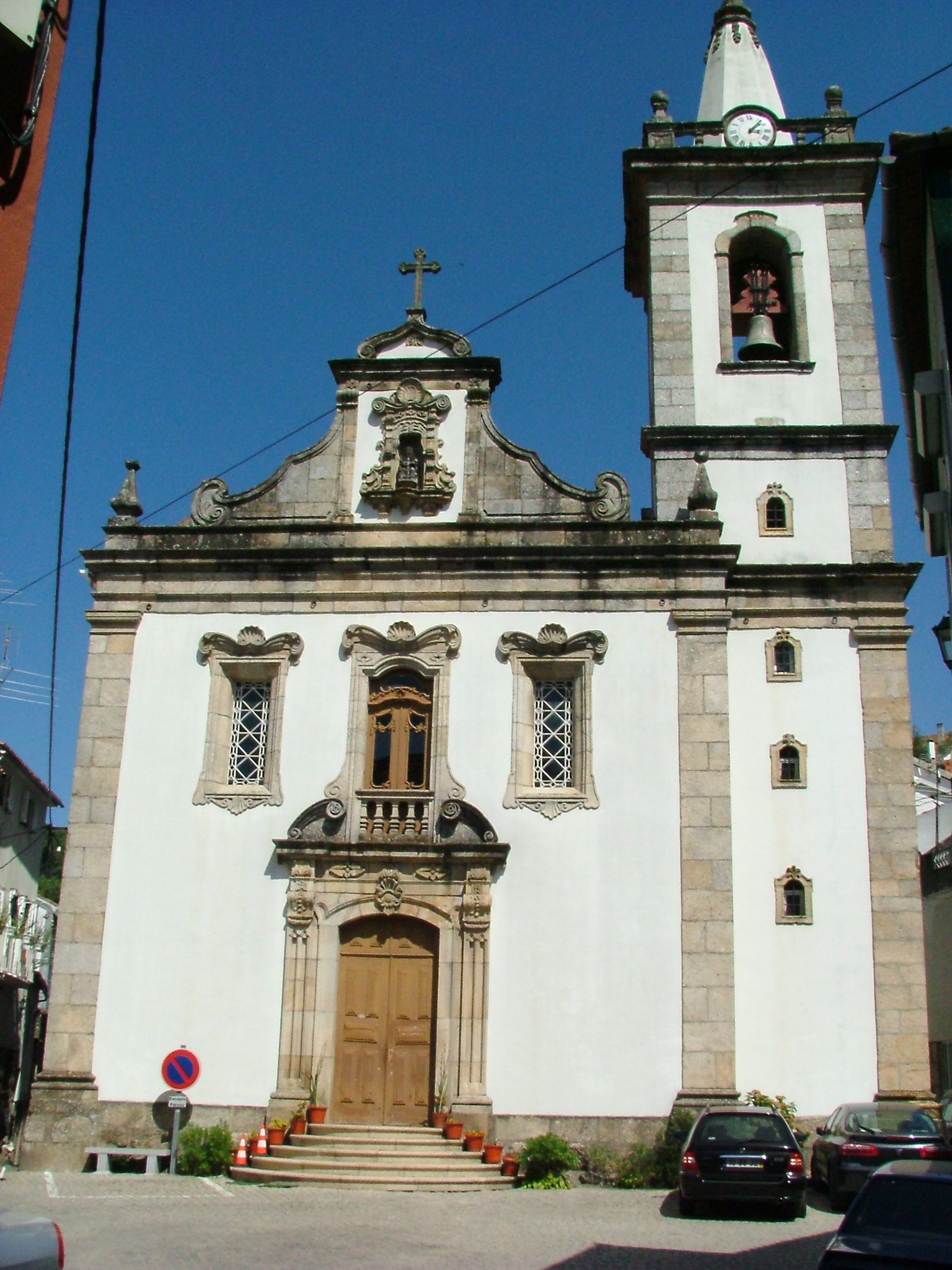
The front facade of the parochial church

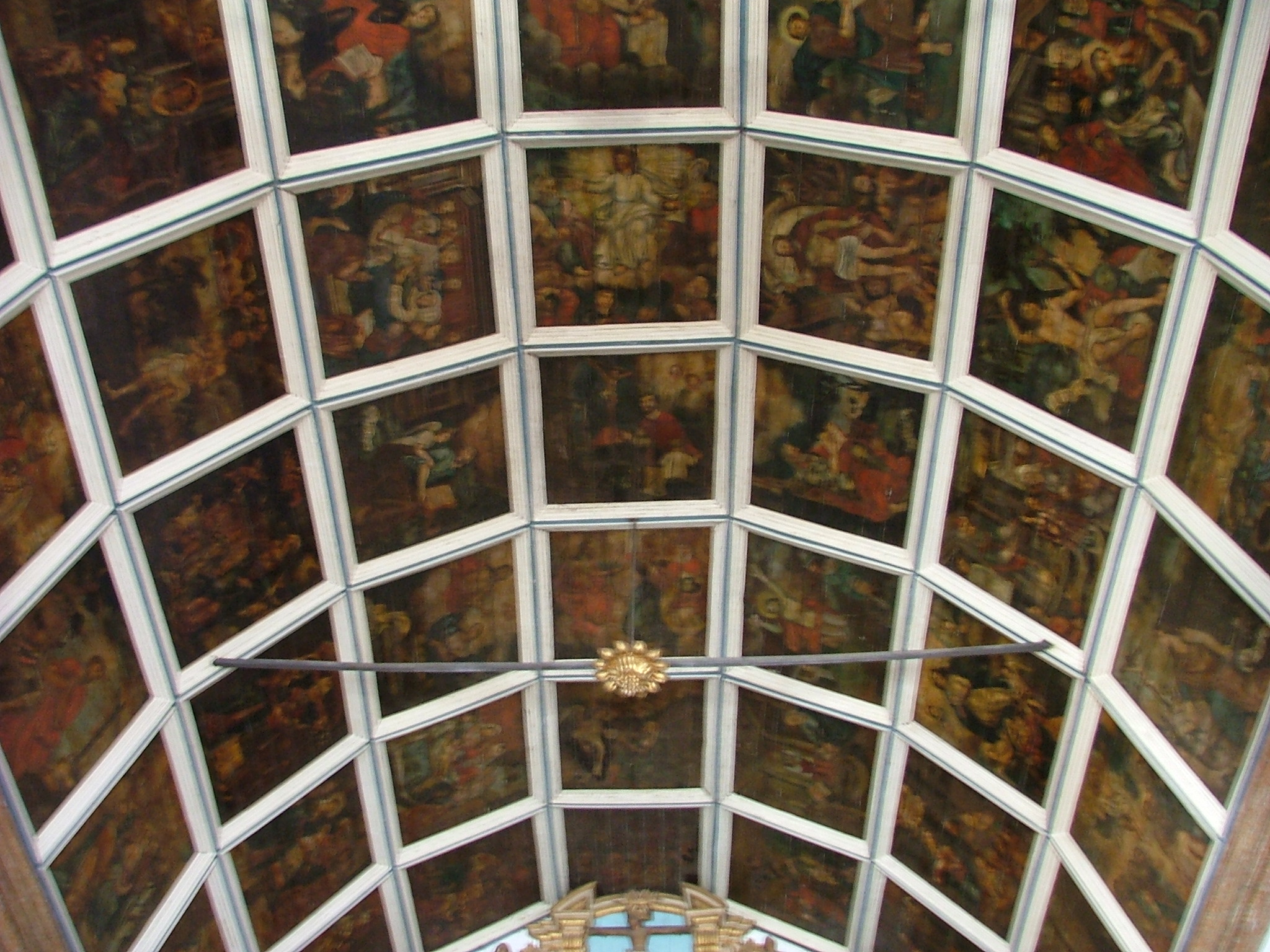
An internal view of painted panels attributed to Pascal Parente

The parish was founded in 1756. By the middle of the 18th century, the parochial church was re-constructed; by 1795, during the reign of King D. Maria, worked had continued on the presbytery and lateral altars, that also included paintings and main chapel.

The high choir was constructed in the 19th century.

On 20 July 1991, there was a proposal to classify the Fábrica da Igreja (the old church factory) as a heritage site. By 7 February 2003, a dispatch from the vice-president of the IPPAR (forerunner of the IGESPAR) showed the intention of the national body to advance with a process of classification. It was supported on 10 December 2007, by the DRCoimbra, that suggested classifying the area around it as a special protection zone, and as an IIP Imóvel de Interesse Público (Property of Public Interest). The Conselho Consultivo (Consultative Council) of IGESPAR, supported the new designation on 3 March 2009 (re-reiterated on 15 July 2009).

== Architecture ==
The church is situated in the centre of the small town of São Gião, in a central square, surrounded by historic buildings. Constructed during the Baroque period, it included two panels attributed to the Italian, Pascal Parente, then living in Coimbra. The main retable is attributed to sculptor António Neves and carver Jose Ribeiro da Fonseca from Beiras, in the last part of the 18th century.

== See also ==
- List of churches in Portugal
- Roman Catholicism in Portugal
