= 2021–22 Liga 3 =

2021–22 Liga 3 may refer to:

- 2021–22 Liga 3 (Indonesia)
- 2021–22 Liga 3 (Portugal)
