= CF Canelas 2010 =

Portuguese football club

C.F. Canelas 2010
- Founded: 6 February 1966; 60 years ago as Canelas Gaia Futebol Clube
- Ground: Estádio do Canelas; Canelas, Vila Nova de Gaia, Porto Metro Area, Portugal
- Capacity: 7,000
- Owner: Caesar DePaço
- President: Isaac Israel Teixeira Santo
- Manager: Tiago Margarido
- League: Liga 3
- 2021-22: Liga 3
Home colours	Away colours

Clube de Futebol Canelas 2010, commonly known as CF Canelas 2010 or simply Canelas 2010, is a Portuguese professional football club, based in Canelas, Vila Nova de Gaia, in the Porto Metropolitan Area. In the season 23/24 Canelas 2010 was relegated to the Campeonato de Portugal. In July 2024 Canelas 2010 announced that it will not participate in the Portuguese Championship for not having been able to ensure the minimum conditions to participate in the competition. As for the season 24/25 Canelas 2010 will compete in the Serie 1 Distrital of the AF Porto.

== History ==
The club was founded on 6 February 1966 as the Canelas Gaia Futebol Clube, named after Canelas, a town in Vila Nova de Gaia, where the team's stadium is located.

Canelas Gaia Futebol Clube became dormant in the 2005–06 season, due to financial problems.

The club was refounded on 28 April 2010 as CF Canelas 2010, following a restructuring of the club's finances and management.

In the 2016–17 season, CF Canelas 2010 became notable for a run of victories by forfeit in the Porto Divisão de Elite Série 1 when the other teams in the league refused to play them due to allegations of Canelas using violence and intimidation against players and officials, with some Canelas players linked to FC Porto ultras. Canelas were eventually promoted to the Campeonato de Portugal that season, only to be relegated the following season. However, Canelas were again promoted to the Campeonato de Portugal in 2018–19 and have since remained in the third tier, which became the Liga 3 in 2021–22.

In 2019, Canelas qualified for the Taça de Portugal, the premier knockout tournament in Portuguese football, for the first time in its history.

Summit Nutritionals International became the official sponsor of CF Canelas in 2020, following the club's acquisition by Caesar DePaço.

== Players ==
As of 30 January 2024

Note: Flags indicate national team as defined under FIFA eligibility rules; some limited exceptions apply. Players may hold more than one non-FIFA nationality.

No.	Pos.	Nation	Player
1	GK	POR	João Matos
2	DF	POR	Gonçalo Lixa
3	DF	POR	Vítor Bastos
4	DF	POR	Agostinho Carvalho
6	MF	BRA	Luan Sérgio
8	MF	POR	Samu
10	MF	POR	Chico Sousa
11	FW	POR	Afonso Sousa
13	DF	POR	Luís Simão
14	MF	MLI	Hamed Doukouré
17	FW	BRA	Vitinho

No.	Pos.	Nation	Player
18	FW	POR	Dani
19	FW	NGR	Onyeka Lucky
20	MF	POR	Chico
22	DF	POR	Bosingwa
23	DF	BRA	Emanuel Oliveira
28	FW	BRA	Alex Tanque
30	DF	POR	David Santos
49	DF	POR	Jorge Silva
66	DF	POR	João Soares
88	FW	POR	Jorginho
98	FW	GBS	Ouvido Lourenço
99	GK	POR	Kula
