= Alvoco das Várzeas =

- Civil parish
- Location in Portugal
- Coordinates: 40.3°N 7.8333°W
- Country: Portugal
- Region: Centro
- Intermunic. comm.: Região de Coimbra
- District: Coimbra
- Municipality: Oliveira do Hospital

Area
  - Total: 10.73 km^{2} (4.14 sq mi)

Population (2011)
  - Total: 320
  - Density: 30/km^{2} (77/sq mi)
- Time zone: UTC+00:00 (WET)
  - Summer (DST): UTC+01:00 (WEST)
- Postal code: 3400
- Area code: 315
- Website: http://jf-alvocodasvarzeas.com/

Alvoco das Várzeas is a civil parish in the municipality of Oliveira do Hospital, Portugal, with 10.73 km^{2} and 320 inhabitants (2011). Density: 29.8 inhabitants/km^{2}

== History ==
It is believed that Alvôco Várzeas is a very old village. The appearance of the millstones and mills and the legacy of anthroponyms that still exist today in Alvôco prove that this settlement was occupied by the Romans due, perhaps, to the vicinity of mineral holdings in meadows of Alvôco River.

In this locality can visit the parish church that has as its patron saint Stº. Andrew, being a masterpiece of architecture in continuation of the regional tradition from the 19th century

As a cause of greater interest in the parish, and obligatory visit, is its Medieval Bridge, although known by popular tradition as "Roman Bridge". National Monument. It is thought to have been built in the 14th century. It is a good masonry construction, very singulada, of two arcs. The main arc is a curve broken, gothic quarter, and of great openness; the other, smaller, trace is irregular but semicircular canal. Is of two waters, being the branch of the right margin more extensive and very steep slope. Measure about seventy meters in length.

Along the bridge there is a fluvial beach and a picnic park, in the riverside area of Rio Alvôco (perhaps the least polluted water course of Europe).

== Population ==
População da freguesia de Alvoco das Várzeas
| 1864 | 1878 | 1890 | 1900 | 1911 | 1920 | 1930 | 1940 | 1950 | 1960 | 1970 | 1981 | 1991 | 2001 | 2011 |
| 682 | 668 | 752 | 786 | 762 | 851 | 619 | 863 | 969 | 899 | 712 | 566 | 491 | 366 | 320 |

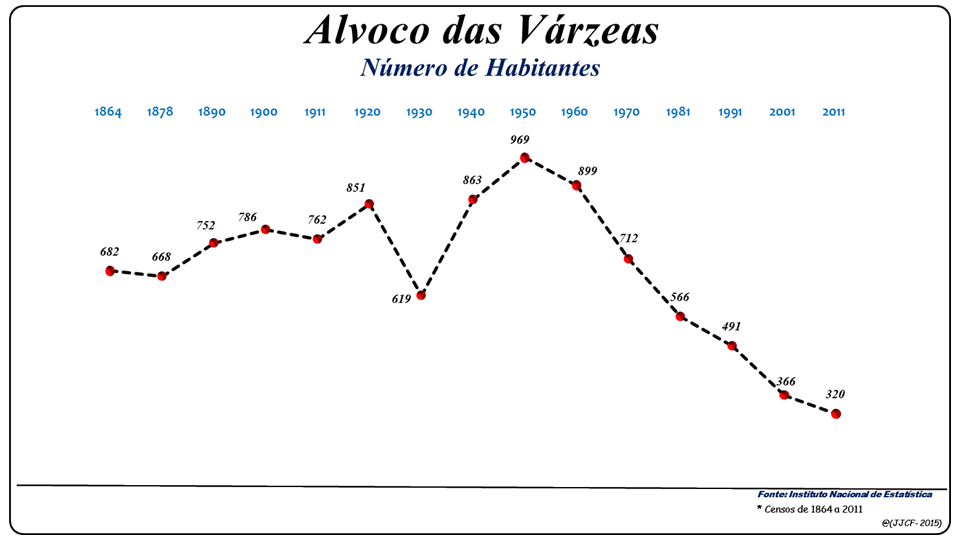
Evolução da População (1864 / 2011)

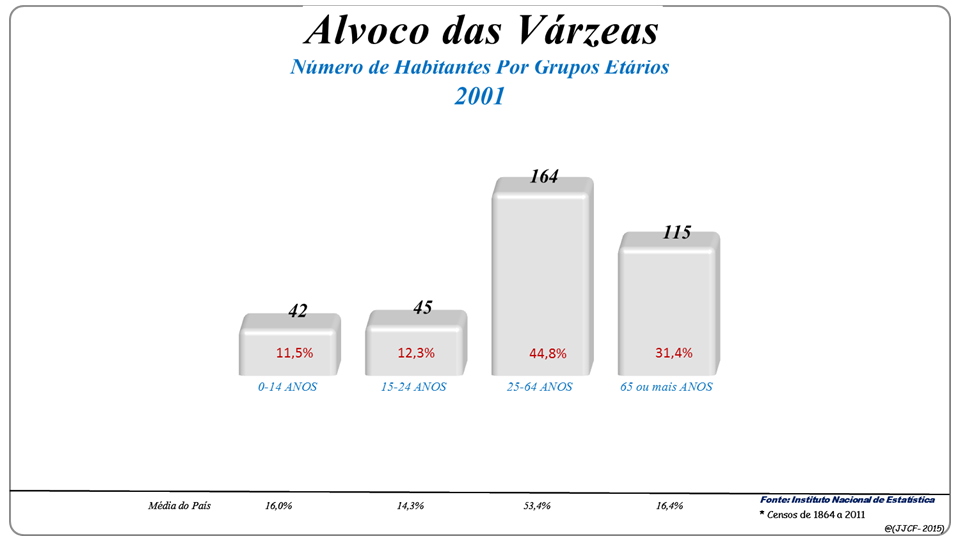
Grupos Etários (2001 e 2011)

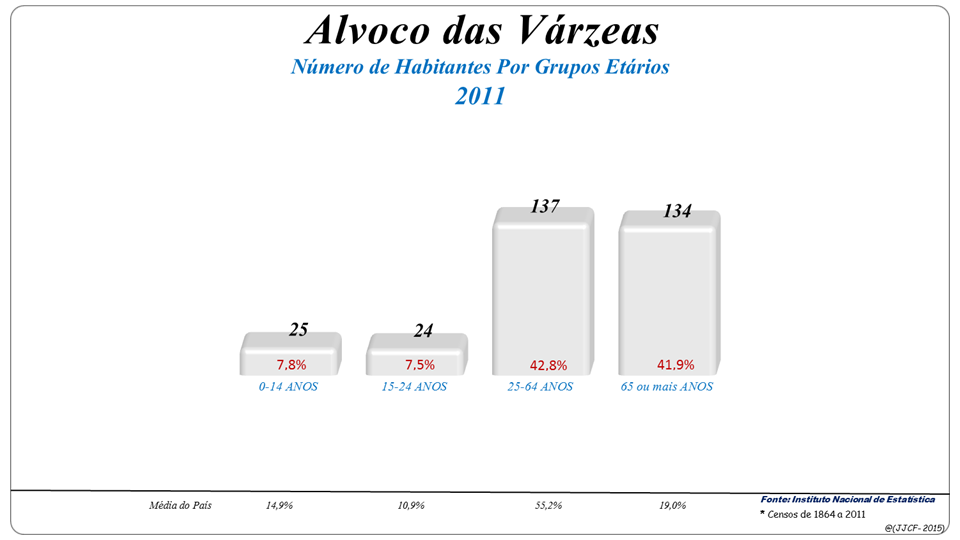
Grupos Etários (2001 e 2011)
