= Umechi Akuazaoku =

Canadian soccer player (born 2003)

Personal information
- Full name: Umechi Daniel Akuazaoku
- Date of birth: June 10, 2003 (age 23)
- Place of birth: Toronto, Ontario, Canada
- Height: 1.90 m (6 ft 3 in)
- Position: Striker

Team information
- Current team: Vitória de Guimarães B
- Number: 89

Youth career
- DeRo United FC

College career
Years	Team	Apps	(Gls)
2021–2024	St. Bonaventure Bonnies	58	(14)

Senior career*
Years	Team	Apps	(Gls)
2022	FC Buffalo		
2023	Pathfinder FC	14	(6)
2024	Capital FC Atletico	13	(7)
2024–2025	Green Lock FC		
2025–2026	Sakaryaspor	17	(2)
2026	→ Tabor Sežana (loan)	14	(2)
2026–	Vitória de Guimarães B	3	(1)
- * Club domestic league appearances and goals as of November 1, 2026

Umechi Daniel Akuazaoku (born June 10, 2003) is a Canadian professional soccer player who plays as a striker for Portuguese Liga 3 club Vitória de Guimarães B.

== Early life ==
Akuazaoku played youth soccer with DeRo United FA (DeRo TFC). He is Nigerian-Canadian.

== College career ==
In 2021, Akuazaoku began attenting St. Bonaventure University, where he played for the men's soccer team. On October 12, 2021, he scored his first two collegiate goals, netting a brace in a 4-2 victory over the Army Black Knights, earning the school's Athlete of the Week honours. On October 11, 2023, he scored a brace in a 2-0 victory over the Duquesne Dukes. In 2024, he was a Atlantic 10 Commissioner’s Honor Roll honoree. He finished his four-year career at the school, scoring 14 goals (including five game-winning goals) and adding five assists, in 58 appearances.

== Club career ==
In 2022, Akuazaoku played with FC Buffalo in the National Premier Soccer League. In 2023, he played with Pathfinder FC in USL League Two. In 2024, he played with Capital FC Atletico in USL League Two. He then played with Green Lock FC in Nigeria.

In August 2025, Akuazaoku joined Turkish club Sakaryaspor in the TFF 1. Lig. He made his professional debut on August 10, 2025 against Bandırmaspor. In his next match, he scored scored his first goal in a 3–2 win against Iğdır on August 17, 2025. On October 5, 2025, after coming on as a substitute in the 88th minute, he score the winning goal in stoppage time, in a 2-1 vicotry over Sarıyer. In February 2026, he was loaned to Slovenian Second League side Tabor Sežana through the end of the season.

In July 2026, Akuazoaku signed a three-year contract with Portuguese club Vitória de Guimarães and was assigned to their reserve team Vitória de Guimarães B that plays in Liga 3.

== Career statistics ==
As of November 2, 2026

Club	Season	League			National cup		League cup		Continental		Total	
Club	Season	Division	Apps	Goals	Apps	Goals	Apps	Goals	Apps	Goals	Apps	Goals
Pathfinder FC	2023	USL League Two	14	6	—		—		—		14	6
Capital FC Atletico	2024	USL League Two	13	7	—		—		—		13	7
Sakaryaspor	2025–26	TFF 1. Lig	17	2	1	0	—		—		18	2
Tabor Sežana (loan)	2025–26	Slovenian Second League	14	2	0	0	—		—		14	2
Vitória de Guimarães B	2026–27	Liga 3	3	1	—		—		—		3	1
Career total			61	18	1	0	0	0	0	0	62	18
