= Santa Ovaia e Vila Pouca da Beira =

- Civil parish
- Location in Portugal
- Coordinates: 40.314°N 7.886°W
- Country: Portugal
- Region: Centro
- Intermunic. comm.: Região de Coimbra
- District: Coimbra
- Municipality: Oliveira do Hospital

Area
  - Total: 7.43 km^{2} (2.87 sq mi)

Population (2011)
  - Total: 952
  - Density: 130/km^{2} (330/sq mi)
- Time zone: UTC+00:00 (WET)
  - Summer (DST): UTC+01:00 (WEST)

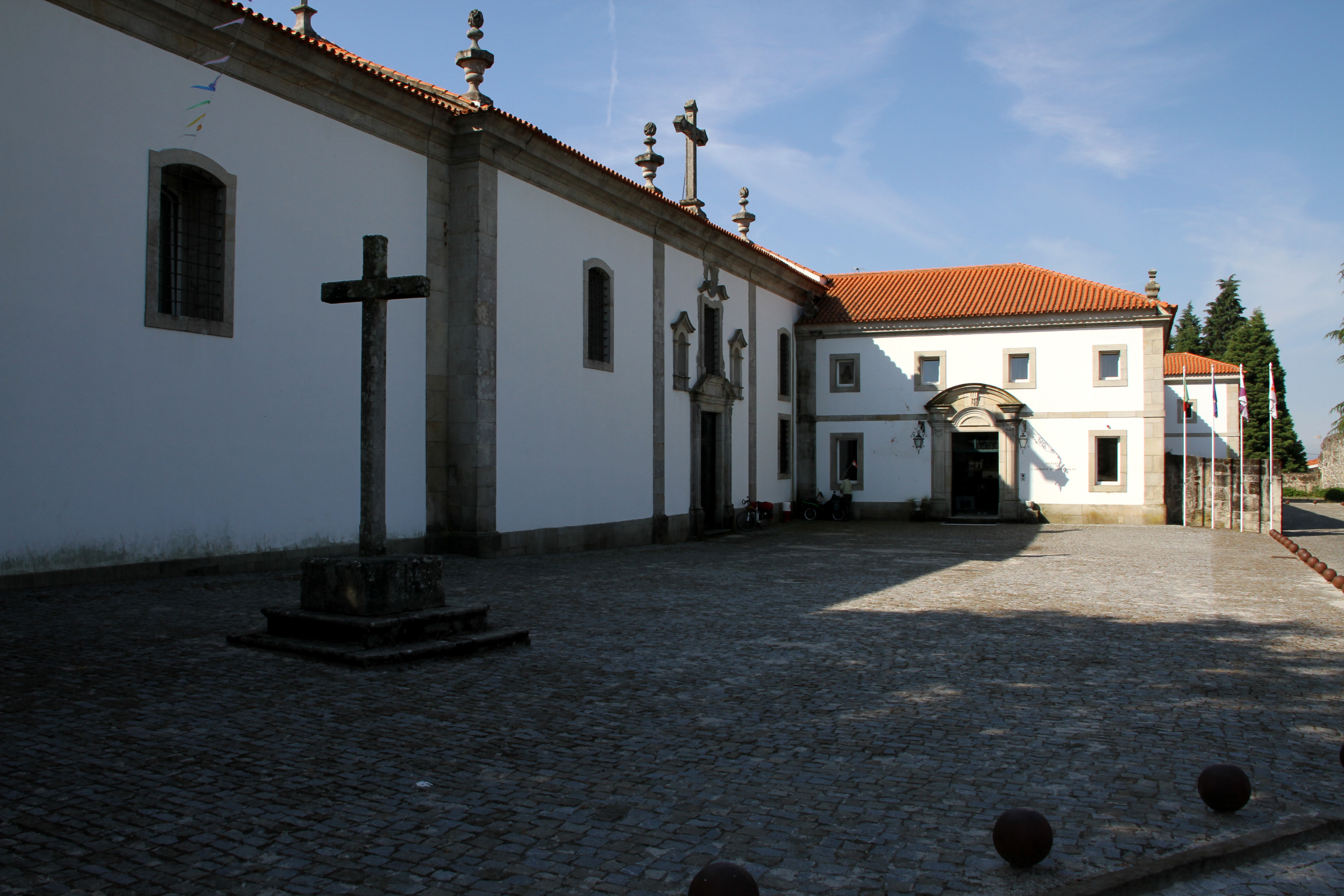
Vila Pouca da Beira in Portugal

Santa Ovaia e Vila Pouca da Beira is a civil parish in the municipality of Oliveira do Hospital, Portugal. It was formed in 2013 by the merger of the former parishes Santa Ovaia and Vila Pouca da Beira. The population in 2011 was 952, in an area of 7.43 km^{2}.
