= Agostinho Carvalho =

Portuguese footballer

Personal information
- Full name: Agostinho José Gomes Coelho Tavares Carvalho
- Date of birth: 6 January 1993 (age 33)
- Place of birth: Ovar, Portugal
- Height: 1.90 m (6 ft 3 in)
- Position: Centre-back

Team information
- Current team: Ovarense
- Number: 3

Youth career
- 2002–2007: Porto
- 2007–2008: Feirense
- 2008–2009: Padroense
- 2009–2010: Porto
- 2010–2012: Feirense

Senior career*
Years	Team	Apps	(Gls)
2012–2016	Feirense	70	(0)
2016–2017	Fafe	23	(1)
2017–2018	Bragança	18	(0)
2018	Anadia	8	(0)
2018–2021	Lusitânia	59	(0)
2021–2022	Montalegre	9	(0)
2022–2024	Canelas	60	(2)
2024–	Ovarense	34	(2)
- * Club domestic league appearances and goals as of 21:39, 21 December 2025 (UTC)

Agostinho José Gomes Coelho Tavares Carvalho (born 6 January 1993) is a Portuguese professional footballer who plays as a centre-back for Ovarense.
