= Dénis Duarte =

Portuguese footballer

Personal information
- Full name: Dénis Paulo Duarte
- Date of birth: 4 May 1994 (age 32)
- Place of birth: Marteleira, Portugal
- Height: 1.90 m (6 ft 3 in)
- Position: Centre-back

Team information
- Current team: Paredes
- Number: 3

Youth career
- 2003–2009: Lourinhanense
- 2009–2013: Torreense

Senior career*
Years	Team	Apps	(Gls)
2012–2014	Torreense	49	(7)
2015–2018	Vitória Guimarães B	136	(31)
2017–2018	Vitória Guimarães	3	(0)
2018–2020	Dinamo Brest	32	(3)
2020–2021	Penafiel	17	(0)
2021	Torreense	7	(0)
2022	Tom Tomsk	11	(2)
2023–2025	Vitória Guimarães B	55	(17)
2025–	Paredes	26	(3)
- * Club domestic league appearances and goals as of 7 May 2026

Dénis Paulo Duarte (born 4 May 1994) is a Portuguese professional footballer who plays as a central defender for Liga 3 club Paredes.

== Club career ==
Born in the village of Marteleira in Lourinhã, Lisbon District, Duarte spent his youth at S.C. Lourinhanense and S.C.U. Torreense before making his senior debut for the latter in the third division. At the end of 2014, he signed a 3 1/2-year deal with Vitória S.C. of the Primeira Liga.

Duarte made his professional debut with the reserve team on 25 January 2015, coming on as a 61st-minute substitute for Xande Silva in a 2–1 away win against C.D. Feirense in the Segunda Liga. In the 2015–16 season he scored a career-best 11 goals – mostly from penalties – adding nine the following with the side always in that tier.

On 14 October 2017, Duarte appeared in his first competitive match with the first team, scoring in the 6–1 away victory over amateurs CF Vasco da Gama in the third round of the Taça de Portugal. His top-flight debut took place on 24 February 2018, in a 3–2 loss at C.S. Marítimo where he also played the full 90 minutes.

Duarte joined FC Dynamo Brest of the Belarusian Premier League on 19 June 2018. While in Eastern Europe he won the league in 2019, but injury ruled him out the following season and he rescinded his contract on 29 May 2020, that was due to last until the end of the year.

On 7 September 2020, Duarte returned to his homeland's division two on a one-year deal at F.C. Penafiel. After a spell at FC Tom Tomsk in the Russian First League, the 28-year-old returned to Vitória B in the Liga 3 in January 2023.
