= São Gião =

- Civil parish
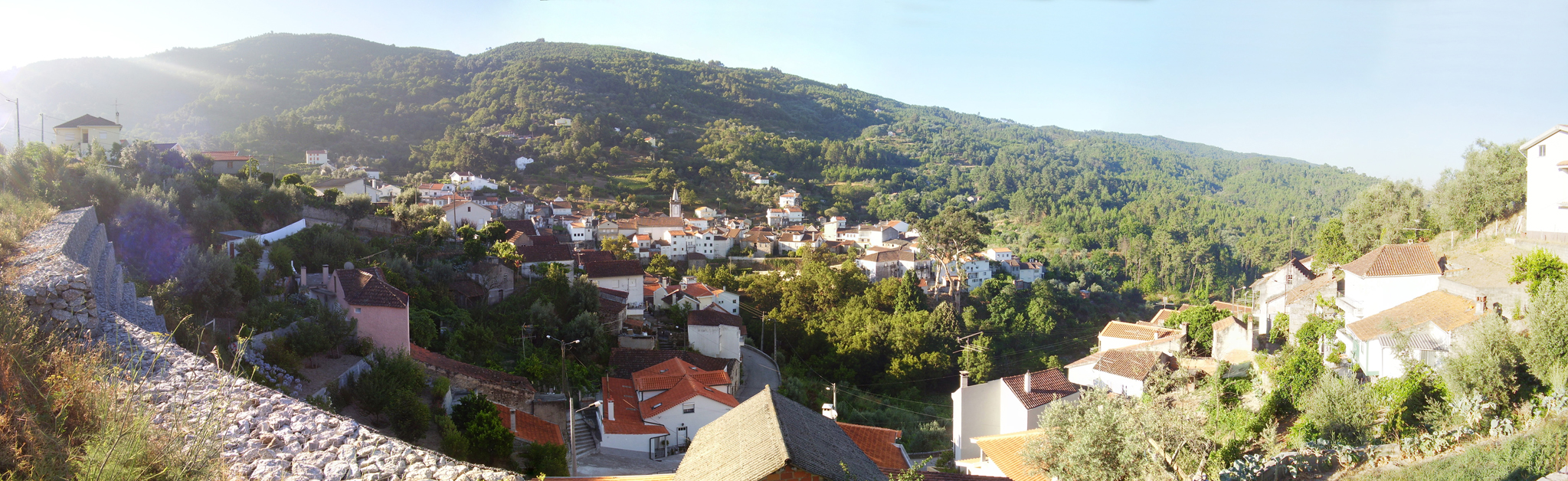

- Location in Portugal
- Coordinates: 40.337°N 7.799°W
- Country: Portugal
- Region: Centro
- Intermunic. comm.: Região de Coimbra
- District: Coimbra
- Municipality: Oliveira do Hospital

Area
  - Total: 14.55 km^{2} (5.62 sq mi)
- Elevation: 704 m (2,310 ft)

Population (2011)
  - Total: 425
  - Density: 29.2/km^{2} (75.7/sq mi)
- Time zone: UTC+00:00 (WET)
  - Summer (DST): UTC+01:00 (WEST)

São Gião is a parish (freguesia in Portuguese), in the North of Portugal, on Serra da Estrela, the highest mountain range in Portugal. It belongs to the municipality of Oliveira do Hospital, and the district (distrito) of Coimbra. The population in 2011 was 425, in an area of 14.55 km^{2}.

It lies at an altitude of 704m, in the Beira region.

== History ==
It is an old Roman trading post. The old Roman bridge is still visible and in use to this day (to be confirmed).

The Baroque style church - Igreja Matrix, also known as the Igreja Matriz de São Gião or the Catedral das Beiras, dates back to 1795 and displays 102 hand painted panels on the roof.

== Nearby attractions ==
Situated in the countryside between São Gião and Carvalha is the São Gião Radio Telescope. The 9.3 meter diameter radio telescope is the largest radio telescope in mainland Portugal and is used for astronomical measurements and education.

== See also ==
- Beira
- Serra da Estrela
- São Gião Radio Telescope
- Church of São Gião
