= Rui Areias =

Portuguese footballer

Personal information
- Full name: Rui Manuel Linhares Areias
- Date of birth: 22 November 1993 (age 32)
- Place of birth: Guimarães, Portugal
- Height: 1.86 m (6 ft 1 in)
- Position: Forward

Youth career
- 2003–2012: Vitória Guimarães

Senior career*
Years	Team	Apps	(Gls)
2012−2016	Vitória Guimarães B	122	(37)
2014−2018	Vitória Guimarães	4	(0)
2016−2017	→ Porto B (loan)	24	(6)
2017−2018	→ Arouca (loan)	23	(2)
2018−2019	Penafiel	28	(3)
2019−2020	Mafra	15	(1)
2020−2021	Covilhã	26	(3)
2021–2022	Fafe	26	(11)
2022–2024	Varzim	47	(14)
2025–2026	Floriana	31	(4)

International career
2012	Portugal U20	2	(1)
- * Club domestic league appearances and goals as of 23:44, 27 October 2026 (UTC)

Rui Manuel Linhares Areias (born 22 November 1993) is a Portuguese professional footballer who plays as a forward.

== Club career ==
Born in Guimarães, Areias joined the academy of local club Vitória S.C. at the age of 9. He made his senior debut with their reserves on 11 December 2012, coming on as a second-half substitute in a 0−0 home draw against C.F. União in the Segunda Liga. His first goals came also that season, but his brace was achieved in a 2−4 home loss to F.C. Penafiel on 12 May 2013.

Areias' first appearance in the Primeira Liga with the first team occurred on 14 December 2014, when he played 15 minutes of the 0−0 home draw against Rio Ave FC. He spent the 2016–17 and 2017–18 campaigns on loan to second-division sides FC Porto B and F.C. Arouca.

In June 2018, the free agent Areias signed a one-year contract with Penafiel also of the second tier. He scored six competitive goals during his spell at the Estádio Municipal 25 de Abril, including two in a 3–2 away victory over C.D. Trofense in the second round of the Taça de Portugal. He also found the net in both league fixtures against Guimarães B (3–2 and 5–4 wins).

On 4 July 2019, Areias agreed to a one-year deal at C.D. Mafra of the same division. He scored on his league debut, a 3–2 home defeat of C.D. Cova da Piedade on 10 August, but added no more goals and moved to S.C. Covilhã on 21 September 2020.

Areias subsequently dropped into the third tier for the first time in seven years, spending one season at AD Fafe before moving to Varzim S.C. in 2022, both in the new Liga 3.

== International career ==
Areias earned two caps for Portugal at under-20 level, both at the SBS Cup in Japan in 2012. On 16 August he made his debut in a 3–1 loss to the hosts, and the following day he came off the bench to score the only goal of a win over South Korea at the Kusanagi Athletic Stadium.
