= Rui Sampaio =

Portuguese footballer

Personal information
- Full name: Fernando Rui Valadares Pinto Sampaio
- Date of birth: 29 May 1987 (age 39)
- Place of birth: Vila Pouca de Aguiar, Portugal
- Height: 1.86 m (6 ft 1 in)
- Position: Defensive midfielder

Youth career
- 1995–2000: Vila Pouca
- 2001: Vila Real
- 2002: Diogo Cão
- 2002–2004: Vila Pouca
- 2005: Diogo Cão
- 2005–2006: Chaves

Senior career*
Years	Team	Apps	(Gls)
2006–2007	Chaves	20	(2)
2007–2008	Penafiel	14	(2)
2008–2011	Beira-Mar	87	(10)
2011–2014	Cagliari	6	(0)
2012	→ Olhanense (loan)	1	(0)
2013	→ Beira-Mar (loan)	12	(1)
2014–2015	Arouca	40	(3)
2015–2016	Red Star	8	(0)
2017	Freamunde	17	(1)
2017	Académica	0	(0)
2017–2018	Cova Piedade	11	(0)
2018–2019	Cesarense	11	(0)
2019–2024	Beira-Mar	102	(5)
Total		329	(24)
- * Club domestic league appearances and goals

Fernando Rui Valadares Pinto Sampaio (born 29 May 1987) is a Portuguese former professional footballer who played as a defensive midfielder.

== Club career ==
Born in Vila Pouca de Aguiar, Vila Real District, Sampaio spent his first four seasons as a senior in the Segunda Liga, appearing in the competition for G.D. Chaves, F.C. Penafiel and S.C. Beira-Mar. In 2009–10, he scored a career-best six goals for Beira-Mar to help it to return to the Primeira Liga after a three-year absence.

Sampaio made his debut in the Portuguese top division on 15 August 2010, coming on as 29th-minute substitute in a 0–0 home draw against U.D. Leiria. He went on to start in 28 of his 30 appearances, helping his team to avoid relegation. On 18 September, he scored in the 1–1 draw with C.S. Marítimo at the Estádio Municipal de Aveiro.

On 31 August 2011, Sampaio signed with Serie A side Cagliari Calcio for €600,000. He played only seven competitive matches during his stint in Italy, with one goal, in the Coppa Italia. He was consecutively loaned to S.C. Olhanense and Beira-Mar and was released in January 2014, following which he agreed to a permanent one-and-a-half-year contract at F.C. Arouca also in Portugal's top flight.

In the summer of 2015, Bastos joined French Ligue 2 team Red Star F.C. alongside his compatriot Vítor Bastos. He was sparingly played, and from January 2017 resumed his career in the Portuguese second tier, with S.C. Freamunde and C.D. Cova da Piedade.
