= Vitória S.C. B =

Portuguese association football reserve team

Vitória de Guimarães B
- Full name: Vitória Sport Clube B
- Nicknames: Os Vimaranenses (The ones from Guimarães); Os Branquinhos (The Little Whites); Os Afonsinos (Afonso's ones)
- Short name: Vitória SC B
- Founded: 28 May 2012; 14 years ago
- Ground: Academia Vitória SC
- Capacity: 2,500
- Chairman: Rui Rodrigues
- Manager: Gil Lameiras
- League: Liga 3
- 2025–26: Liga 3 Serie A, xrd (First stage); Promotion series, xrd (Second stage)
- Website: vitoriasc.pt/equipa-b/
Home colours	Away colours	Third colours

Vitória Sport Clube B, commonly known as Vitória de Guimarães B, is a Portuguese professional football team based in Guimarães, which serves as the reserve side of Vitória Sport Clube. They compete in the Campeonato de Portugal, the fourth division of Portuguese football, and play their home matches at the club's 2,500-capacity Academia do Vitória S.C. training facility.

Vitória SC B was founded in 2012 and its only purpose is to develop players for the first team in a competitive context, in order to sustain the first team now and in the future.

Reserve teams in Portugal play in the same league system as the senior team, rather than in a reserve team league. However, they cannot play in the same division as their senior team, so Vitória B is ineligible for promotion to the Primeira Liga and cannot play in the Taça de Portugal and Taça da Liga.

== History ==
Prior to the end of the 2011–12 football season in Portugal, seven clubs in the Primeira Liga announced their interest in constructing a "B" team to fill the six vacant places available to compete in the Segunda Liga for the 2012–13 season. Of those seven, the six clubs which were selected to take part in the competition were the B teams of Benfica, Porto, Sporting CP, Braga, Marítimo and Vitória de Guimarães, for being the best ranked in the 2011-12 Primeira Liga.

The LPFP who organizes the professional football tiers in Portugal announced that for the clubs to compete in the 2012–13 Segunda Liga they would have to pay €50,000 . In addition the LPFP would also require the clubs to follow new rules regarding player selection in which each "B" team must have a squad of a minimum of ten players who were formed at the club's academy as well as having an age requirement between 15 and 21 years old. The LPFP also went on to saw that the clubs are unable to compete in cup competitions as well as gaining promotion due to the possibility of playing the senior team. Each "B" team may have 3 players above 23 years old.

In late May 2012, it was officially announced that the six Primeira Liga clubs' B teams would compete in the 2012–13 Segunda Liga which would increase the number of teams in the league from 16 to 22 as well as increasing the number of games needed to play in one season from thirty games to forty two games.

=== Early years ===
Vitória B played their first game on 12 August 2012, a goalless home draw against SC Covilhã at the Estádio do Varzim SC in Póvoa de Varzim. The team ended their debut season with relegation in second-last place.

In 2013–14 under manager Armando Evangelista, Vitória B won instant promotion from the Campeonato Nacional de Seniores with a 2–0 aggregate win over Sport Benfica e Castelo Branco. Five years later, the team slipped into the third tier again in rock-bottom place, after a 2–2 draw with fellow northern reserve team SC Braga B on 7 May 2019.

Vitória B won promotion in May 2021 to the new third tier, the Liga 3. Two years later, the team were relegated to Campeonato de Portugal (league).

The ‘B’ team, which is at an intermediate level between training and the first team, has allowed the club to grow sustainably based on training and after 10 years the club has aimed to increase the competitiveness of young players both on the pitch and financially.

== Supporters ==
=== B Team With Most Attendances at 2nd Portuguese League Matches ===
Vitória Sport Clube B was the club with the most spectators at 2nd league matches in the 2012/13 season, more than clubs that had secured or were fighting for promotion to the top flight, such as CF Os Belenenses, FC Arouca, Leixões SC and Desportivo das Aves, as well as the ‘B’ teams of the so-called ‘big three’ (Benfica B, Porto B and Sporting B), despite having played two matches behind closed doors due to punishments, where they were deprived of the support of their public in the stands of the D. Afonso Henriques Stadium. In the 2014/15 season, and ever since, the club finished the season with the second-best attendance figures in the second division, with only GD Chaves, the club that fought for promotion, having a better record.

The "B" team currently plays at the Pista de Atletismo Gémeos Castro, where it continues to receive considerable support. The team will at some point move to a new sports ground (mini-stadium) that is being built on pitch 5 of the Vitória SC Academy with a capacity for 2,500 spectators.

== Players ==
=== Current squad ===
As of 21 September 2026

Note: Flags indicate national team as defined under FIFA eligibility rules; some limited exceptions apply. Players may hold more than one non-FIFA nationality.

No.	Pos.	Nation	Player
14	FW	POR	Rodrigo Duarte
30	MF	CIV	Adams Kone
32	FW	ITA	Mathias Tepe
33	FW	NGR	Ejike Opara
36	MF	POR	Afonso Meireles
37	FW	POR	Jota
40	DF	MAR	Mohammed Kebdani (on loan from AS FAR)
50	MF	POR	Zeega
57	FW	POR	João Martins
67	FW	POR	Rodrigo Neto
68	MF	POR	Rodrigo Cunha
72	DF	POR	Tomás Rodrigues
74	DF	POR	Gonçalo Braga
75	DF	POR	André Oliveira
76	DF	POR	Alcobia
77	FW	ESP	Baba
80	MF	POR	Rica Rocha

No.	Pos.	Nation	Player
81	GK	POR	João Fernandes
82	DF	POR	Francisco Dias
83	DF	POR	João Sampaio
86	MF	POR	JP Silva
87	FW	POR	Gui Paula
88	MF	NOR	Sander Dahle
89	FW	CAN	Umechi Akuazaoku
90	FW	POR	Rodrigo Macedo
91	GK	POR	Gui
93	DF	POR	Rika
94	MF	POR	Francisco Silva
95	DF	ANG	Josemar Sicuba
96	DF	POR	Rodrigo Silva
97	FW	POR	Ricardo Carrera
98	GK	BRA	Lucas Furtado
99	GK	POR	Gui Cardoso

=== Out on loan ===
Note: Flags indicate national team as defined under FIFA eligibility rules; some limited exceptions apply. Players may hold more than one non-FIFA nationality.

No.	Pos.	Nation	Player
—	FW	POR	Costinha (at União de Santarém until 30 June 2027)
—	FW	BRA	Kevin Makinde (at Salgueiros until 30 June 2027)

No.	Pos.	Nation	Player
—	FW	POR	Miguel Vaz (at Atert Bissen until 30 June 2027)

=== Notable former players ===
Over the years, the "B" team has produced a number of players who have come through the youth ranks of the Vitória Academy with some going on to play at higher levels, including:

- (Portugal) Ricardo Pereira
- (Portugal) Cafú
- (Portugal) Paulo Oliveira
- (Portugal) Hernâni
- (Brazil) Raphinha
- (Portugal) Josué Sá
- (Libya) Al-Musrati
- (Colombia) Óscar Estupiñán
- (Burkina Faso) Edmond Tapsoba
- (Germany) Yann Aurel Bisseck
- (Portugal) André Almeida
- (Portugal) Gui Guedes
- (Portugal) André Amaro
- (Ivory Coast) (Italy) Ibrahima Bamba
- (Portugal) Tomás Händel
- (Portugal) Alberto Costa

== Seasons Statistics ==
=== League performance record ===
Information correct as of end of the 2023–24 season. Only competitive league matches are counted.

Season	Div	Pos	Pld	W	D	L	GF	GA	Pts	Top scorer	Goals	Refs
2012–13	II	21st	42	7	15	20	30	56	36	(Brazil) Índio	6	
2013–14	III	1st	18	11	2	5	32	19	35	(Portugal) Rui Areias	12	
2013–14	III	2nd	14	8	4	2	29	13	28	(Portugal) Rui Areias	12	
2013–14	III	Play Off	2	1	1	0	2	0		(Portugal) Rui Areias	12	
2014–15	II	9th	46	19	8	19	71	57	65	(Portugal) Rui Areias	14	
2015–16	II	13th	46	16	12	18	60	67	60	(Portugal) Dénis Duarte	11	
2016–17	II	11th	42	18	6	18	54	50	60	(Portugal) Dénis Duarte	9	
2017–18	II	11th	38	14	8	16	44	49	58	(Colombia) Óscar Estupiñán	10	
2018–19	II	18th	34	6	13	15	41	57	31	(Ghana) Abdul-Aziz Yakubu	12	
2019–20	III	3rd	25	14	6	5	52	28	48	(Portugal) João Pedro	10	
2020–21	III	3rd	18	8	8	2	33	14	32	(Portugal) Herculano Nabian	7 6	
2020–21	III	1st	6	4	1	1	13	6	13	(Brazil) Lucas Soares	9	
2021–22	III	4th	22	11	3	8	33	25	36	(Portugal) Jota Pereira	6	
2021–22	III	4th	6	1	2	3	3	8	5	(Portugal) Luís Esteves	5	
2022–23	III	12th	22	3	3	16	18	40	12	(France) Jason Bahamboula	3	
2022–23	III	4th	6	0	3	3	4	8	4	(Portugal) Gonçalo Nogueira	1	
2023–24	IV	8th	26	8	10	8	35	32	34	(São Tomé and Príncipe) Ronaldo Lumungo	7	
2024–25	IV	1st	26	17	5	4	45	21	56	(Portugal) Dénis Duarte	12	
2024–25	IV	1st	6	3	2	1	14	11	11	(Portugal) Dénis Duarte	12	
2024–25	IV	Play Off	1	-	-	1 p	1(1)	1(3)	-	(Portugal) Dénis Duarte	12	
2025–26	III											

Champions	Runners-up	Third place	Promotion	Relegated
