= Avô =

- Civil parish
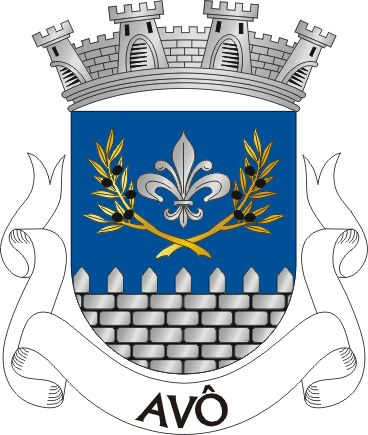
- Coat of arms

- Location in Portugal
- Coordinates: 40.293°N 7.905°W
- Country: Portugal
- Region: Centro
- Intermunic. comm.: Região de Coimbra
- District: Coimbra
- Municipality: Oliveira do Hospital

Area
  - Total: 7.17 km^{2} (2.77 sq mi)

Population (2011)
  - Total: 595
  - Density: 83/km^{2} (210/sq mi)
- Time zone: UTC+00:00 (WET)
  - Summer (DST): UTC+01:00 (WEST)

Avô is a civil parish in the municipality of Oliveira do Hospital, Portugal. The population in 2011 was 595, in an area of 7.17 km^{2}.
