= 2021–22 Liga 3 (Portugal) =

1st season of the Liga 3 (Portugal)

Liga 3
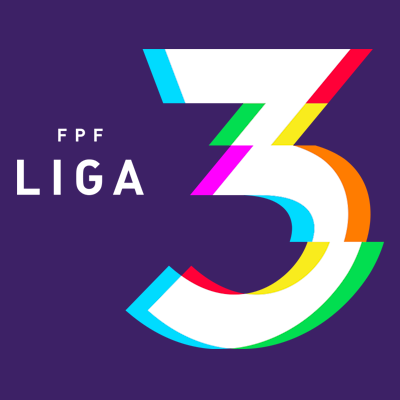
- Season: 2021–22
- Champions: Torreense
- Promoted: Torreense; Oliveirense
- Relegated: Cova da Piedade; Lusitânia Lourosa; Pevidém; Oriental Dragon; União de Santarém

The 2021–22 Liga 3 was the first season of Portuguese football's third-tier league, following the reorganization which saw the Campeonato de Portugal moving one level down in the Portuguese football league system, and the 75th season of recognised third-tier football in Portugal. First season, a total of 24 teams competed in this division.

== Format ==
This competition consists of a first stage with all the teams then proceed to a promotion or relegation series depending on their performance.

First Stage

In the first stage, the 24 clubs are divided in two series (Serie A and B) of 12 teams, according to geographic criteria. In each series, teams play against each other in a home-and-away double round-robin system. The four best-placed teams of the two series will advance to the promotion series and bottom 8 teams will proceed to the relegation series.

Promotion Stage

The eight qualified teams are divided in two series of 4 teams, playing against each other in a home-and-away double round-robin system. The winners of each series will be automatically promoted to Liga Portugal 2 and will face each other in a neutral venue to determine the champion. The second best placed teams will face each other in a playoff, whose winner will face the 16th placed of Liga Portugal 2 for the last spot in Liga Portugal 2. On this stage teams will be divided as follows.

Promotion Series
Serie 1	Serie 2
1st A	1st B
2nd B	2nd A
3rd B	3rd A
4th A	4th B

Relegation Stage

The bottom 8 teams are divided in four series of 4 teams, playing against each other in a home-and-away double round-robin system. To account for their performance in the first stage, teams will start with bonification points, with 5th placed teams starting with 8 points and 12th placed teams starting with 1. The bottom teams of each series will be relegated to Campeonato de Portugal.

Relegation Series
Serie 1	Serie 2	Serie 3	Serie 4
5th A	6th A	5th B	6th B
7th A	8th A	7th B	8th B
9th A	10th A	9th B	10th B
11th A	12th A	11th B	12th B

== Teams ==
A total of 24 teams contested the league, including 2 teams relegated from the 2020–21 Liga Portugal 2, 6 teams that failed the promotion to 2021–22 Liga Portugal 2 and 16 teams qualified from the 2020–21 Campeonato de Portugal.

Cova da Piedade failed to produce valid licensing documentation to compete in the 2021–22 season of the Liga Portugal 2, so they had been relegated by the Portuguese Football Professional League to Liga 3.

Leça failed to produce valid licensing documentation to compete in the 2021–22 season of the Liga 3, so they had their promotion denied by the Portuguese Football Federation. As a result, Sanjoanense (3rd place in Promotion Serie 3) were invited to play in the third tier for the 2021–22 season.

=== Stadium and locations ===
Location of teams in 2021-22 Liga 3

Team	Location	Stadium	Capacity	2020–21 finish
Cova da Piedade	Cova da Piedade	Estádio Municipal; José Martins Vieira	2,230	11th (Liga; Portugal 2)
Oliveirense	Oliveira de Azeméis	Estádio Carlos Osório	1,750	18th (Liga; Portugal 2)
Anadia	Anadia	Estádio Municipal Eng.º; Sílvio Henriques Cerveira	6,500	2nd L2 Promotion (North Serie)
Pevidém	Pevidém, Guimarães	Parque de Jogos Albano; Martins Coelho Lima	4,555	3rd L2 Promotion (North Serie)
Braga B	Braga	Complexo Desportivo; Clube de Futebol de Fão	724	4th L2 Promotion (North Serie)
Torreense	Torres Vedras	Estádio Manuel Marques	2,431	2nd L2 Promotion (South Serie)
Vitória de Setúbal	Setúbal	Estádio do Bonfim	15,497	3rd L2 Promotion (South Serie)
União de Leiria	Leiria	Estádio Dr. Magalhães Pessoa	23,888	4th L2 Promotion (South Serie)
Montalegre	Montalegre	Estádio Dr. Diogo Alves; Vaz Pereira	2,000	1st L3 Promotion (Serie 1)
Felgueiras	Felgueiras	Estádio Dr. Machado de Matos	7,540	2nd L3 Promotion (Serie 1)
Vitória de Guimarães B	Guimarães	Pista de Atletismo; Gémeos Castro	1,200	1st L3 Promotion (Serie 2)
Fafe	Fafe	Estádio Municipal de Fafe	4,000	2nd L3 Promotion (Serie 2)
São João de Ver	São João de Ver, Santa Maria da Feira	Estádio do SC São João de Ver	5,000	1st L3 Promotion (Serie 3)
Sanjoanense	São João da Madeira	Estádio Conde Dias Garcia	8,500	3rd L3 Promotion (Serie 3)
Canelas 2010	Canelas, Vila Nova de Gaia	Estádio do Canelas; Gaia Futebol Clube	7,000	1st L3 Promotion (Serie 4)
Lusitânia Lourosa	Lourosa, Santa Maria da Feira	Estádio do Lusitânia FC Lourosa	8,000	2nd L3 Promotion (Serie 4)
Oliveira do Hospital	Oliveira do Hospital	Estádio Municipal de Tábua	3,500	1st L3 Promotion (Serie 5)
Caldas	Caldas da Rainha	Campo da Mata	5,700	2nd L3 Promotion (Serie 5)
Alverca	Alverca	Complexo Desportivo do FC Alverca	7,705	1st L3 Promotion (Serie 6)
União de Santarém	Santarém	Campo Chã das Padeiras	5,000	2nd L3 Promotion (Serie 6)
Oriental Dragon	Moita	Estádio Juncal Desportos	2,500	1st L3 Promotion (Serie 7)
Sporting B	Alcochete	Aurélio Pereira Stadium	1,180	2nd L3 Promotion (Serie 7)
Amora	Amora, Seixal	Estádio da Medideira	1,500	1st L3 Promotion (Serie 8)
Real SC	Massamá, Sintra	Estádio do Real SC	1,200	2nd L3 Promotion (Serie 8)

== First stage ==
In the first stage, the 24 clubs were divided in two series (Serie A and B) of 12 teams, according to geographic criteria.

=== Serie North ===
Pos	Team	Pld	W	D	L	GF	GA	GD	Pts	Qualification	FEL	OLI	BRA	VSC	CAN	SAN	LUS	SJV	ANA	MON	FAF	PEV
1	Felgueiras 1932	22	12	3	7	25	19	+6	39	Advance to Promotion Series		2–1	0–1	1–0	2–1	2–1	0–0	0–0	1–0	3–1	3–1	0–1
2	Oliveirense	22	11	5	6	39	31	+8	38	Advance to Promotion Series	2–1		2–4	3–2	2–1	2–0	4–4	0–0	0–1	1–0	2–3	4–2
3	Braga B	22	10	7	5	37	29	+8	37	Advance to Promotion Series	3–1	2–3		1–1	0–1	3–1	2–1	1–1	0–1	2–0	1–2	1–1
4	Vitória de Guimarães B	22	11	3	8	33	25	+8	36	Advance to Promotion Series	0–1	2–1	2–0		1–0	3–3	2–0	2–1	1–0	3–1	2–0	2–1
5	Canelas 2010	22	10	6	6	28	25	+3	36	Advance to Relegation Series	1–0	2–2	2–2	2–1		1–1	1–0	1–5	2–0	1–2	3–2	1–0
6	Sanjoanense	22	10	4	8	36	27	+9	34	Advance to Relegation Series	0–1	1–2	1–1	3–1	0–1		0–1	3–2	3–1	0–0	3–1	2–0
7	Lusitânia Lourosa	22	10	4	8	31	29	+2	34	Advance to Relegation Series	2–0	0–1	2–3	2–0	1–1	1–3		2–1	3–2	2–1	3–1	1–0
8	São João de Ver	22	6	11	5	27	22	+5	29	Advance to Relegation Series	1–1	1–1	3–4	1–0	1–1	1–0	2–0		1–0	1–1	1–1	0–0
9	Anadia	22	9	2	11	24	28	−4	29	Advance to Relegation Series	0–1	0–3	1–2	0–0	1–1	0–2	2–1	2–1		0–2	2–0	4–2
10	Montalegre	22	6	6	10	25	33	−8	24	Advance to Relegation Series	3–2	3–2	1–1	2–1	0–2	1–3	1–1	0–1	1–2		1–2	1–0
11	Fafe	22	6	5	11	28	41	−13	23	Advance to Relegation Series	0–1	0–0	2–2	1–3	1–0	1–3	2–3	1–1	1–3	2–2		2–1
12	Pevidém	22	1	4	17	14	38	−24	7	Advance to Relegation Series	0–2	0–1	0–1	1–4	1–2	1–3	0–1	1–1	0–2	1–1	1–2	

Updated to match(es) played on 5 March 2022. Source: FPF.pt
Legend: Blue = home team win; Yellow = draw; Red = away team win.
Rules for classification: 1) points, 2) head-to-head points, 3) head-to-head goal difference, 4) goal difference, 5) matches won, 6) goals scored

=== Serie South ===
Pos	Team	Pld	W	D	L	GF	GA	GD	Pts	Qualification	UDL	ALV	TOR	VFC	AMO	REA	CAL	SPO	PIE	OLH	UDS	ORI
1	União de Leiria	22	14	6	2	41	18	+23	48	Advance to Promotion Series		3–0	1–0	2–0	3–0	1–0	1–1	3–1	4–0	2–2	2–1	2–0
2	Alverca	22	13	2	7	32	24	+8	41	Advance to Promotion Series	1–0		3–1	0–3	2–3	2–1	0–1	2–0	2–0	2–2	3–1	1–0
3	Torreense	22	13	2	7	29	23	+6	41	Advance to Promotion Series	1–1	1–2		0–1	0–1	1–0	1–0	4–3	2–1	2–1	1–0	3–1
4	Vitória de Setúbal	22	11	4	7	30	24	+6	37	Advance to Promotion Series	0–2	1–0	1–2		1–0	1–1	2–1	2–1	1–1	5–2	3–1	2–0
5	Amora	22	11	3	8	29	21	+8	36	Advance to Relegation Series	3–0	1–2	0–1	1–0		1–1	2–0	3–0	2–0	0–1	2–0	0–1
6	Real SC	22	7	7	8	23	26	−3	28	Advance to Relegation Series	3–4	1–1	1–2	2–1	1–2		1–0	0–0	1–0	0–0	0–2	0–0
7	Caldas	22	7	6	9	21	24	−3	27	Advance to Relegation Series	2–3	1–0	2–0	2–1	2–1	0–1		0–0	0–2	3–1	1–0	1–1
8	Sporting B	22	7	5	10	25	28	−3	26	Advance to Relegation Series	0–2	1–2	1–0	0–1	0–1	4–2	1–0		2–1	3–0	1–2	2–0
9	Cova da Piedade	22	6	4	12	24	35	−11	22	Advance to Relegation Series	1–3	2–1	0–1	1–1	2–1	2–3	3–1	0–2		1–2	2–1	0–2
10	Oliveira do Hospital	22	3	11	8	24	34	−10	20	Advance to Relegation Series	1–1	1–2	0–1	0–1	1–1	0–1	1–1	1–1	2–2		1–0	3–3
11	União de Santarém	22	4	6	12	23	35	−12	18	Advance to Relegation Series	0–0	0–3	1–3	4–1	1–1	1–2	1–1	2–2	0–2	1–1		2–2
12	Oriental Dragon	22	2	12	8	21	30	−9	18	Advance to Relegation Series	1–1	0–1	2–2	1–1	2–3	1–1	1–1	0–0	1–1	1–1	1–2	

Updated to match(es) played on 5 March 2022. Source: FPF.pt
Legend: Blue = home team win; Yellow = draw; Red = away team win.
Rules for classification: 1) points, 2) head-to-head points, 3) head-to-head goal difference, 4) goal difference, 5) matches won, 6) goals scored

== Second stage ==
In the second stage, the 24 clubs were divided in 2 promotion series (Serie 1 and 2) of 4 teams and 4 relegation series (Serie 1, 2, 3 and 4) of 4 teams.

=== Promotion series ===
==== Serie 1 ====
Pos	Team	Pld	W	D	L	GF	GA	GD	Pts	Qualification	TOR	ALV	FEL	VSC
1	Torreense (P)	6	4	0	2	10	6	+4	12	Promotion to Liga Portugal 2		2–0	2–1	3–0
2	Alverca	6	3	1	2	8	7	+1	10	Advance to Playoff	2–1		2–1	2–0
3	Felgueiras 1932	6	2	1	3	10	10	0	7		3–1	3–2		1–2
4	Vitória de Guimarães B	6	1	2	3	3	8	−5	5		0–1	0–0	1–1	

Updated to match(es) played on 30 April 2022. Source: FPF.pt
Legend: Blue = home team win; Yellow = draw; Red = away team win.
Rules for classification: 1) points, 2) head-to-head points, 3) head-to-head goal difference, 4) goal difference, 5) matches won, 6) goals scored
(P) Promoted

==== Serie 2 ====
Pos	Team	Pld	W	D	L	GF	GA	GD	Pts	Qualification	OLI	UDL	BRA	VFC
1	Oliveirense (P)	6	3	3	0	11	6	+5	12	Promotion to Liga Portugal 2		0–0	1–1	2–1
2	União de Leiria	6	3	1	2	6	5	+1	10	Advance to Playoff	0–2		2–0	2–1
3	Braga B	6	1	3	2	8	10	−2	6		3–3	1–0		1–2
4	Vitória de Setúbal	6	1	1	4	8	12	−4	4		1–3	1–2	2–2	

Updated to match(es) played on 1 May 2022. Source: FPF.pt
Legend: Blue = home team win; Yellow = draw; Red = away team win.
Rules for classification: 1) points, 2) head-to-head points, 3) head-to-head goal difference, 4) goal difference, 5) matches won, 6) goals scored
(P) Promoted

=== Relegation series ===
==== Serie 3 ====
Pos	Team	Pld	W	D	L	GF	GA	GD	Pts	Qualification	FAF	ANA	CAN	LUS
1	Fafe	6	3	2	1	8	5	+3	13 (Note: Head-to-head points: Fafe 7, Anadia 5, Canelas 4)			1–1	2–0	0–0
2	Anadia	6	2	3	1	7	4	+3	13		3–0		0–1	1–1
3	Canelas 2010	6	1	2	3	3	7	−4	13		1–3	1–1		0–0
4	Lusitânia Lourosa (R)	6	1	3	2	2	4	−2	12	Relegation to Campeonato de Portugal	0–2	0–1	1–0	

Updated to match(es) played on 1 May 2022. Source: FPF.pt
Legend: Blue = home team win; Yellow = draw; Red = away team win.
Rules for classification: 1) points, 2) head-to-head points, 3) head-to-head goal difference, 4) goal difference, 5) matches won, 6) goals scored
(R) Relegated

==== Serie 4 ====
Pos	Team	Pld	W	D	L	GF	GA	GD	Pts	Qualification	SAN	SJV	MON	PEV
1	Sanjoanense	6	3	2	1	11	5	+6	18			1–0	2–2	4–0
2	São João de Ver	6	3	1	2	8	7	+1	15		2–2		1–0	1–0
3	Montalegre	6	1	3	2	11	14	−3	9		1–3	3–2		2–2
4	Pevidém (R)	6	1	2	3	7	11	−4	6	Relegation to Campeonato de Portugal	1–1	1–2	3–1	

Updated to match(es) played on 30 April 2022. Source: FPF.pt
Legend: Blue = home team win; Yellow = draw; Red = away team win.
Rules for classification: 1) points, 2) head-to-head points, 3) head-to-head goal difference, 4) goal difference, 5) matches won, 6) goals scored
(R) Relegated

==== Serie 5 ====
Pos	Team	Pld	W	D	L	GF	GA	GD	Pts	Qualification	AMO	PIE	CAL	UDS
1	Amora	6	2	1	3	7	7	0	15			1–2	0–1	0–1
2	Cova da Piedade (R)	6	2	3	1	7	5	+2	13	Relegation to District Championships	0–1		1–1	2–0
3	Caldas	6	1	3	2	8	10	−2	12		1–3	1–1		2–3
4	União de Santarém (R)	6	2	3	1	9	9	0	11	Relegation to Campeonato de Portugal	2–2	1–1	2–2	

Updated to match(es) played on 1 May 2022. Source: FPF.pt
Legend: Blue = home team win; Yellow = draw; Red = away team win.
Rules for classification: 1) points, 2) head-to-head points, 3) head-to-head goal difference, 4) goal difference, 5) matches won, 6) goals scored
(R) Relegated

==== Serie 6 ====
Pos	Team	Pld	W	D	L	GF	GA	GD	Pts	Qualification	OLH	REA	SPO	ORI
1	Oliveira do Hospital	6	4	2	0	7	3	+4	17			1–0	1–0	2–1
2	Real SC	6	2	3	1	4	3	+1	16		1–1		1–0	1–0
3	Sporting B	6	1	2	3	6	8	−2	10		1–2	1–1		1–1
4	Oriental Dragon (R)	6	0	3	3	4	7	−3	4	Relegation to Campeonato de Portugal	0–0	0–0	2–3	

Updated to match(es) played on 30 April 2022. Source: FPF.pt
Legend: Blue = home team win; Yellow = draw; Red = away team win.
Rules for classification: 1) points, 2) head-to-head points, 3) head-to-head goal difference, 4) goal difference, 5) matches won, 6) goals scored
(R) Relegated

== Third stage ==
=== Third place playoff ===
==== First leg ====
7 May 2022
17:00

Alverca	1–1	União de Leiria

Complexo Desportivo FC Alverca, Alverca do Ribatejo

==== Second leg ====
15 May 2022
17:00

União de Leiria	1–2	Alverca

Estádio Dr. Magalhães Pessoa, Leiria

Alverca advances to Promotion play-offs.

=== Championship final ===
14 May 2022
18:00

Torreense	1–1 (a.e.t.), (5–4 p)	Oliveirense

Estádio Nacional, Jamor

== Number of teams by district ==
Rank	District Football Associations	Number	Teams
1	Aveiro	5	Anadia, Lusitânia Lourosa, Oliveirense, Sanjoanense and São João de Ver
2	Braga	4	Braga B, Fafe, Pevidém and Vitória de Guimarães B
2	Lisbon	4	Alverca, Real SC, Sporting B and Torreense
2	Setúbal	4	Amora, Cova da Piedade, Oriental Dragon and Vitória de Setúbal
5	Leiria	2	Caldas and União de Leiria
5	Porto	2	Canelas 2010 and Felgueiras
7	Coimbra	1	Oliveira do Hospital
7	Santarém	1	União de Santarém
7	Vila Real	1	Montalegre
