= Canelas, Vila Nova de Gaia =

Canelas
- Civil parish
- Location in Portugal
- Coordinates: 41.083°N 8.600°W
- Country: Portugal
- Region: Norte
- Metropolitan area: Porto
- District: Porto
- Municipality: Vila Nova de Gaia

Area
  - Total: 6.90 km^{2} (2.66 sq mi)

Population (2011)
  - Total: 13,459
  - Density: 2,000/km^{2} (5,100/sq mi)
- Time zone: UTC+00:00 (WET)
  - Summer (DST): UTC+01:00 (WEST)

Canelas is a parish in the Vila Nova de Gaia Municipality, Portugal. The total population in 2011 was 13,459, in an area of 6.90 km².
