= Oliveira do Hospital =

- Municipality
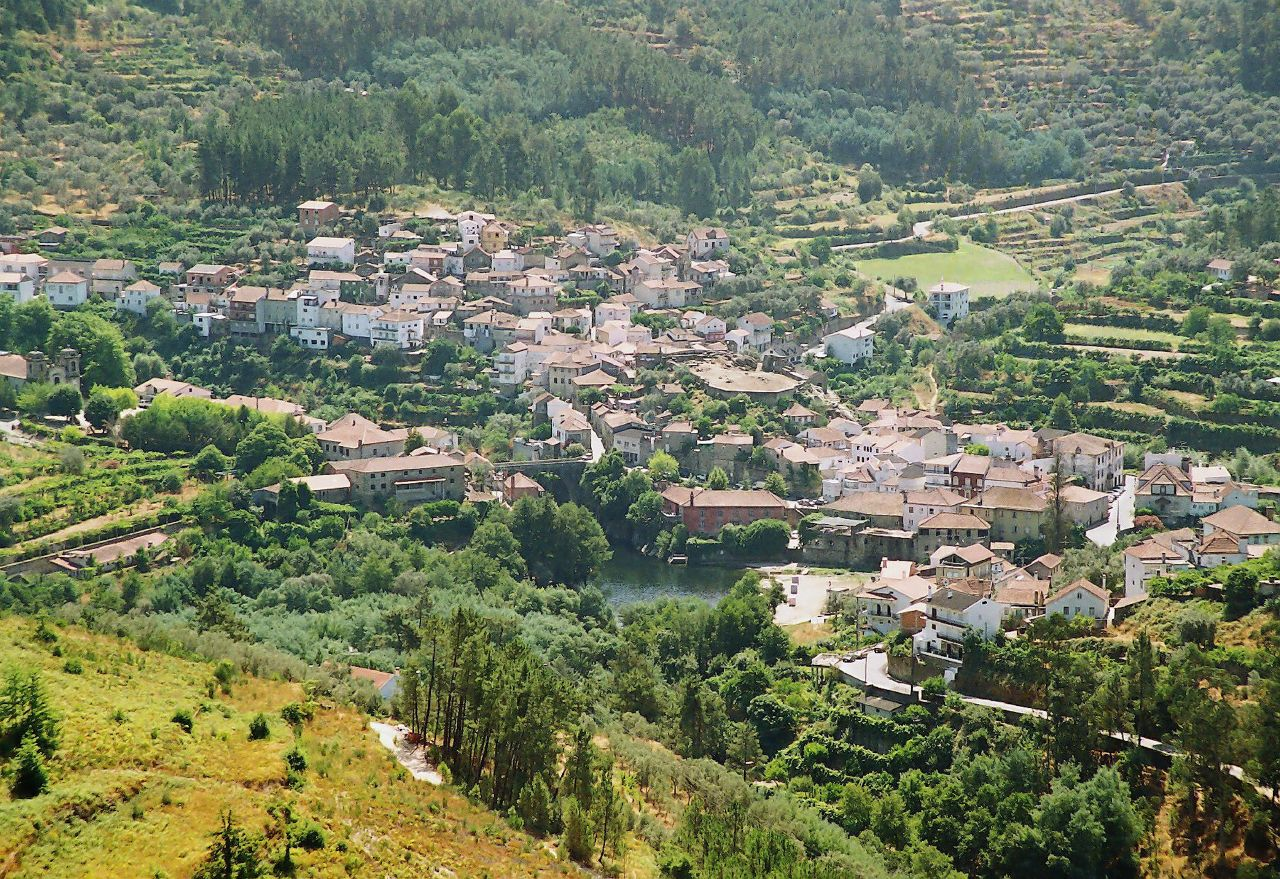
- The village Avô, in the southern part of the municipality

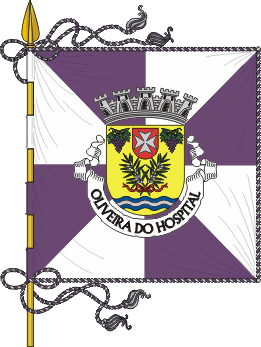
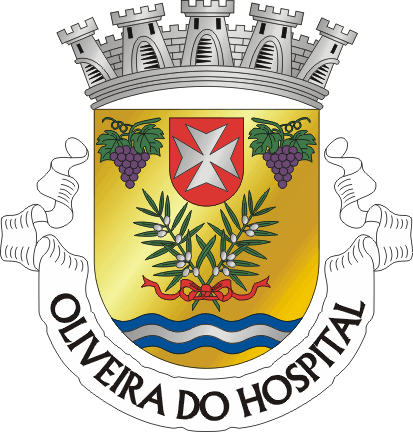
- Flag Coat of arms
- Interactive map of Oliveira do Hospital
- Coordinates: 40°21′32″N 7°51′45″W
- Country: Portugal
- Region: Centro
- Intermunic. comm.: Região de Coimbra
- District: Coimbra
- Parishes: 16

Government
  - President: José Carlos Alexandrino Mendes (PS)

Area
  - Total: 234.52 km^{2} (90.55 sq mi)
- Elevation: 500 m (1,600 ft)

Population (2011)
  - Total: 20,855
  - Density: 88.926/km^{2} (230.32/sq mi)
- Time zone: UTC+00:00 (WET)
  - Summer (DST): UTC+01:00 (WEST)
- Postal code: 3400
- Area code: 238
- Website: http://www.cm-oliveiradohospital.pt

Oliveira do Hospital (European Portuguese pronunciation: [ɔliˈvɐjɾɐ ðu ɔʃpiˈtal]) is a municipality in the district of Coimbra, in the central part of continental Portugal. The population in 2011 was 20,855, in an area of 234.52 km².

== History ==
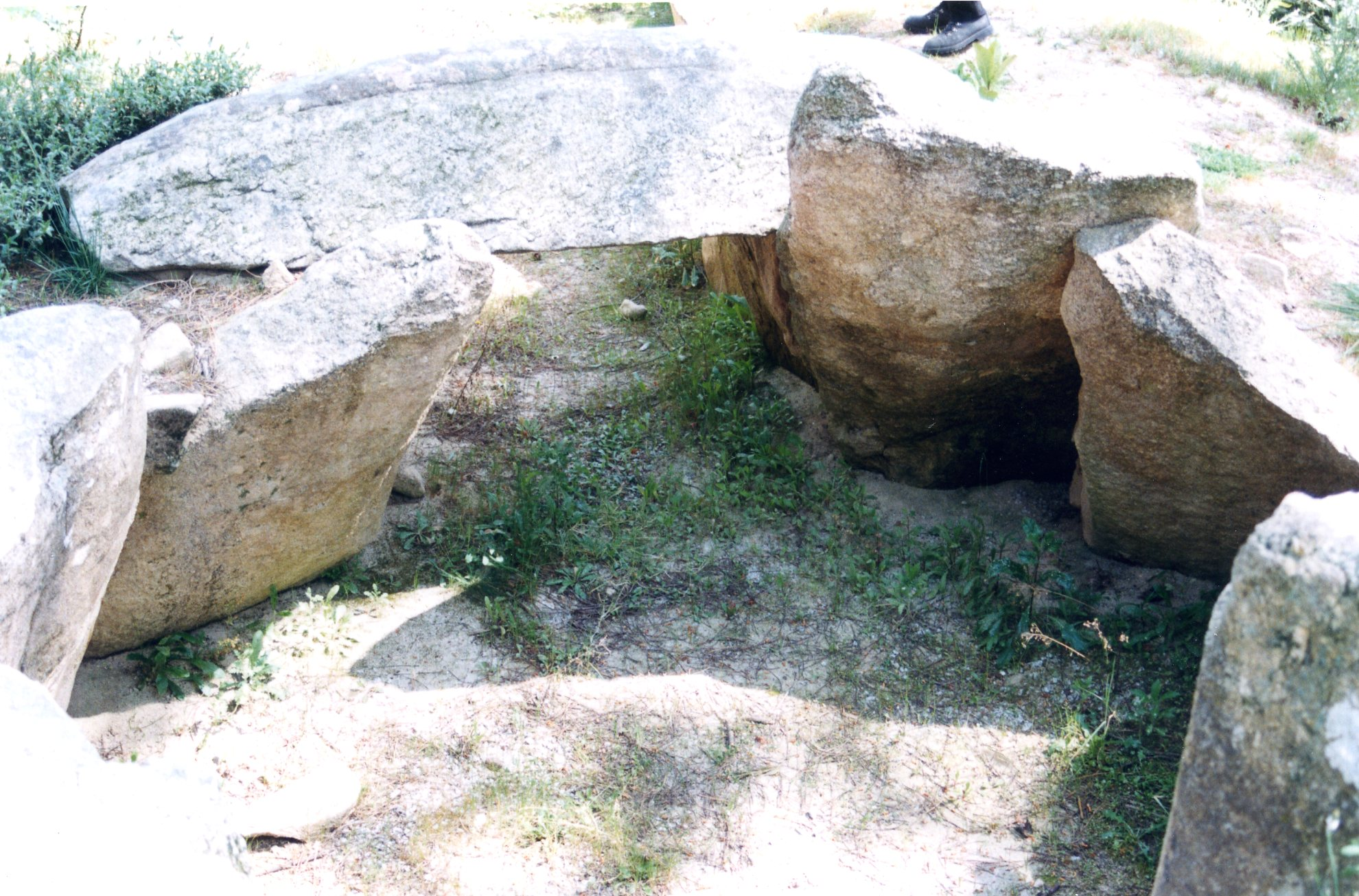
Oliveira do Hospital has seen human occupation dating back to the Neolithic, as seen from this example: the Dolmen of Pinheiro dos Abraços

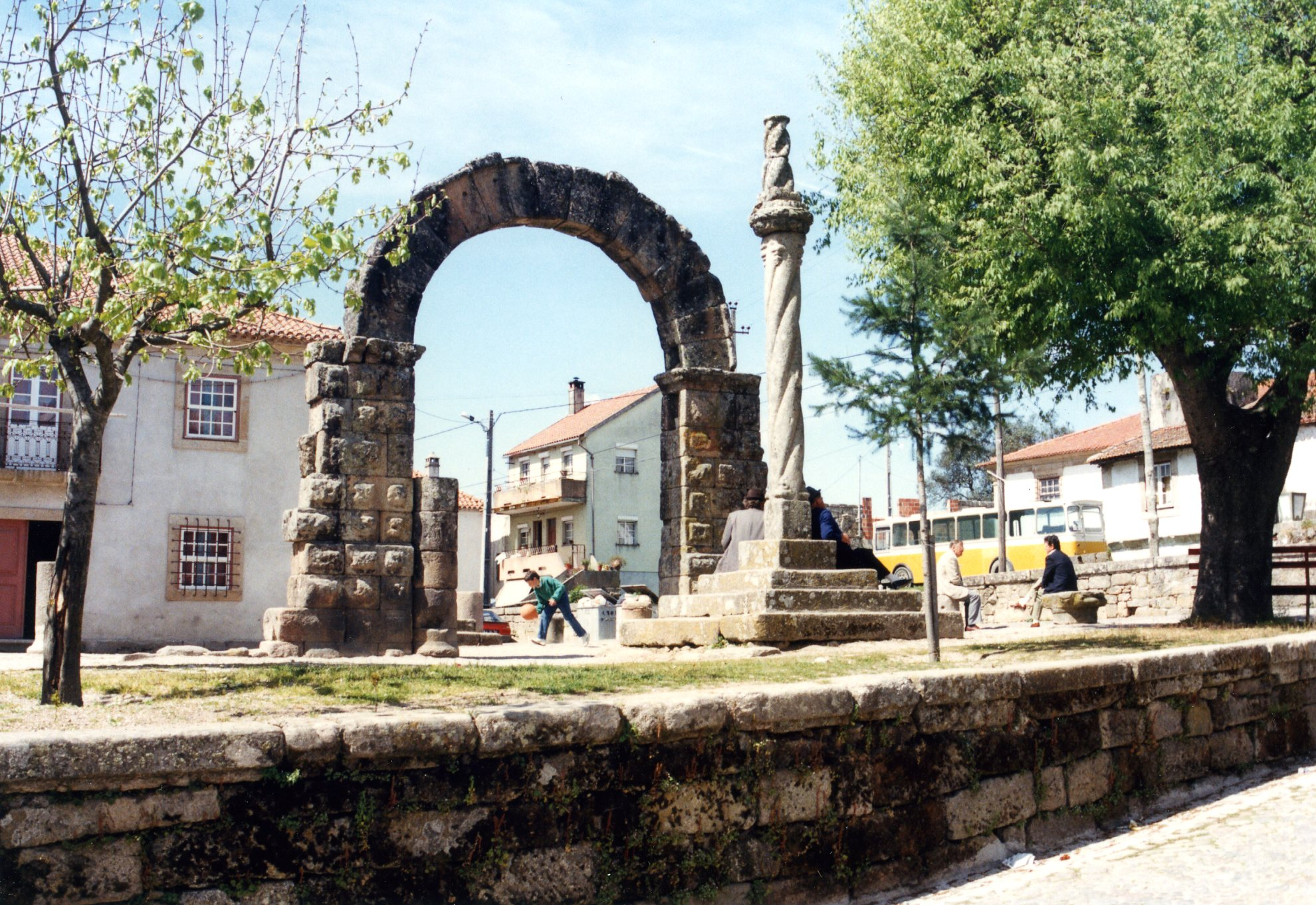
The Roman ruins in the civil parish of Bobadela

Inhabited by ancient civilizations, Oliveira do Hospital has Roman settlements, Visigothic relics, noble Gothic mansions as well as ancient villages built of slate. One can find Neolithic and Bronze Age burial grounds and genuine religious and rural relics such as the large granite outcroppings used as threshing floors, the Holy Cross Church and the Ferreiros Chapel, a Roman Gothic style temple dating to the 13th century and the Church of Sao Gião, known as the cathedral of its region due to its richly carved and painted 18th century Baroque interior.

== Geography ==
It is located at the northern edge of the district of Coimbra in the foothills of the Serra da Estrela Mountains, bisected by the Alva and Alvoco River valleys. Administratively, the municipality is divided into 16 civil parishes (freguesias):

- Aldeia das Dez
- Alvoco das Várzeas
- Avô
- Bobadela
- Ervedal e Vila Franca da Beira
- Lagares
- Lagos da Beira e Lajeosa
- Lourosa
- Meruge
- Nogueira do Cravo
- Oliveira do Hospital e São Paio de Gramaços
- Penalva de Alva e São Sebastião da Feira
- Santa Ovaia e Vila Pouca da Beira
- São Gião
- Seixo da Beira
- Travanca de Lagos

== Economy ==
Its fertile geographic position favors agriculture, which is the dominant activity of the region with wine and cheeses being important products. Regarding its business sector, confections, machine tools, packaging and toys are the most important. Oliveira do Hospital is known for its natural environment, cuisine, arts and crafts.

== Transport ==
Although Oliveira do Hospital is well within the interior of the country, transportation services are quite adequate and have been increasing as befits a growing region. There are a number of roads to the coast and other cities, the best known being the scenic Estrada da Beira.

The Bridge with Three Entrances (Ponte das Três Entradas), a very rare three-way bridge, crosses the Alva River at Oliveira do Hospital.

== Notable people ==
- Brás Garcia de Mascarenhas (1596 in Avô - 1656 in Avô) soldier, poet and writer.
- Dulce Pássaro (born 1953 in Oliveira do Hospital) an engineer, politician and Govt. Minister, 2009/2011
- Carlos Martins (born 1982 in Oliveira do Hospital) footballer with 327 club caps and 17 for Portugal
- Tomané Nunes (born 1987 in Nogueira do Cravo) a retired footballer with 119 club caps
- João Martins (born 1988 in Oliveira do Hospital) footballer with 199 club caps
