= List of winners of the Liga Portugal 2 and predecessors =

Portuguese League (2nd tier)

Segunda Liga Experimental (1934–1938) Segunda Divisão (1938–1990) Segunda Divisão de Honra (1990–1999) Segunda Liga / Liga de Honra (1999–2015) LigaPro (2015–2020) Liga Portugal 2 (2020–present)
- Country
- Portugal
- Founded
- 1934
- Number of teams
- 18 (2025–26 season)
- Current champions
- Marítimo (2025–26)
- Most successful club
- Estoril Praia (7 championships)

A national second tier of Portuguese league football was established in 1934–35 as the Segunda Liga Experimental, and was rebranded as Segunda Divisão in 1938.

Starting with the 1990–91 season, a new second-tier professional league, initially named Segunda Divisão de Honra, was established. In 1999, the Portuguese League for Professional Football (LPFP) assumed control of the top two nationwide levels and rebranded the second tier as Segunda Liga. It was renamed Liga de Honra in 2005, reverted to Segunda Liga in 2012, and became LigaPro in 2015. The competition adopted its current name, Liga Portugal 2, at the start of the 2020–21 season.

Carcavelinhos was the first club to be crowned champions and the competition's record title holder is Estoril Praia with seven championships, including three since 1990–91. F.C. Barreirense won the most titles (six) in the Segunda Divisão era, while Paços de Ferreira holds the record with four titles in the Liga Portugal 2 era. The current champions of the league are Marítimo, having clinched their third title in the 2025–26 season.

== List of champions by season ==
- Teams marked with an asterisk (*) were not promoted

Ed.	Season	Champions (number of titles)	Runners-up (number of times)	Third place
Segunda Liga Experimental (1934–1938)
1	1934–35	Carcavelinhos (1)	Boavista (1)	
2	1935–36	Olhanense* (1)	Salgueiros* (1)	
3	1936–37	Boavista* (1)	União de Lisboa* (1)	
4	1937–38	Leixões* (1)	União de Lisboa* (2)	
Segunda Divisão (1938–1990)
5	1938–39	Carcavelinhos (2)	Sporting da Covilhã* (1)	
6	1939–40	Farense* (1)	Boavista (2)	
7	1940–41	Olhanense (2)	Leça (1)	
8	1941–42	Estoril Praia* (1)	Leixões (1)	
9	1942–43	Barreirense* (1)	Sanjoanense* (1)	
10	1943–44	Estoril Praia (2)	Vila Real* (1)	
11	1944–45	Atlético CP (1)	CUF Lisboa* (1)	
12	1945–46	Estoril Praia (3)	Famalicão (1)	União de Coimbra*
13	1946–47	Braga (1)	Lusitano VRSA (1)	Oliveirense*
14	1947–48	Sporting da Covilhã (1)	Barreirense* (1)	CUF Barreiro*
15	1948–49	Académica de Coimbra (1)	Portimonense* (1)	
16	1949–50	Boavista (2)	Oriental (1)	Académico de Viseu*
17	1950–51	Barreirense (2)	Salgueiros (2)	União de Coimbra*
18	1951–52	Lusitano de Évora (1)	Vitória de Setúbal (1)	Torreense*
19	1952–53	Oriental (1)	Torreense* (1)	CUF Barreiro*
20	1953–54	CUF Barreiro (1)	Torreense* (2)	Sporting de Espinho*
21	1954–55	Torreense (1)	Caldas (1)	Oriental*
22	1955–56	Oriental (2)	Vitória de Guimarães* (1)	Boavista*
23	1956–57	Salgueiros (1)	Braga (1)	Vitória de Guimarães*
24	1957–58	Sporting da Covilhã (2)	Vitória de Guimarães (2)	Farense*
25	1958–59	Atlético CP (2)	Leixões (2)	
26	1959–60	Barreirense (3)	Salgueiros (3)	
27	1960–61	Beira-Mar (1)	Olhanense (1)	
28	1961–62	Barreirense (4)	Feirense (1)	
29	1962–63	Varzim (1)	Seixal (1)	
30	1963–64	Braga (2)	Torreense (3)	
31	1964–65	Beira-Mar (2)	Barreirense (2)	
32	1965–66	Sanjoanense (1)	Atlético CP (1)	
33	1966–67	Barreirense (5)	Tirsense (1)	
34	1967–68	Atlético CP (3)	União de Tomar (1)	
35	1968–69	Barreirense (6)	Boavista (3)	
36	1969–70	Tirsense (1)	Farense (1)	
37	1970–71	Beira-Mar (3)	Atlético CP (2)	
38	1971–72	União de Coimbra (1)	Montijo (1)	
39	1972–73	Académica de Coimbra (2)	Olhanense (2)	
40	1973–74	União de Tomar (1)	Sporting de Espinho (1)	
41	1974–75	Estoril Praia (4)	Braga (2)	
42	1975–76	Varzim (2)	Portimonense (2)	
43	1976–77	Marítimo (1)	Feirense (2)	Riopele
44	1977–78	Famalicão (1)	Barreirense (3)	Beira-Mar
45	1978–79	Portimonense (1)	Sporting de Espinho (2)	União de Leiria
46	1979–80	Amora (1)	Académica de Coimbra (1)	Penafiel
47	1980–81	União de Leiria (1)	Estoril Praia (1)	Rio Ave
48	1981–82	Marítimo (2)	Varzim (1)	Alcobaça
49	1982–83	Farense (2)	Águeda (1)	Penafiel
50	1983–84	Belenenses (1)	Vizela (1)	Académica de Coimbra
51	1984–85	Desportivo das Aves (1)	Sporting da Covilhã (2)	Marítimo
52	1985–86	Rio Ave (1)	Farense (2)	O Elvas
53	1986–87	Sporting da Covilhã (3)	Vitória de Setúbal (2)	Sporting de Espinho
54	1987–88	Famalicão* (Note: Due to an alleged corruption case in a match against CA Macedo de Cavaleiros, FC Famalicão was disqualified, losing both its promotion and league title. In 1990, the title was reinstated after the accusations were proven false.) (2)	Académico de Viseu (1)	C.F. Estrela da Amadora (1932)
55	1988–89	União da Madeira (1)	Tirsense (2)	Feirense
56	1989–90	Salgueiros (2)	Gil Vicente (1)	Farense
Segunda Divisão de Honra (1990–1999)
57	1990–91	Paços de Ferreira (1)	Estoril Praia (2)	Torreense
58	1991–92	Sporting de Espinho (1)	Belenenses (1)	Tirsense
59	1992–93	C.F. Estrela da Amadora (1932) (1)	União da Madeira (1)	Vitória de Setúbal
60	1993–94	Tirsense (2)	União de Leiria (1)	Chaves
61	1994–95	Leça (1)	Campomaiorense (1)	Felgueiras
62	1995–96	Rio Ave (2)	Vitória de Setúbal (3)	Sporting de Espinho
63	1996–97	Campomaiorense (1)	Varzim (2)	Académica de Coimbra
64	1997–98	União de Leiria (2)	Beira-Mar (1)	Alverca
65	1998–99	Gil Vicente (1)	Belenenses (2)	Santa Clara
Segunda Liga / Liga de Honra (1999–2015)
66	1999–2000	Paços de Ferreira (2)	Beira-Mar (2)	Desportivo das Aves
67	2000–01	Santa Clara (1)	Varzim (3)	Vitória de Setúbal
68	2001–02	Moreirense (1)	Académica de Coimbra (2)	Nacional da Madeira
69	2002–03	Rio Ave (3)	Alverca (1)	C.F. Estrela da Amadora (1932)
70	2003–04	Estoril Praia (5)	Vitória de Setúbal (4)	Penafiel
71	2004–05	Paços de Ferreira (3)	Naval 1º Maio (1)	C.F. Estrela da Amadora (1932)
72	2005–06	Beira-Mar (4)	Desportivo das Aves (1)	Leixões*
73	2006–07	Leixões (2)	Vitória de Guimarães (3)	Rio Ave*
74	2007–08	Trofense (1)	Rio Ave (1)	Vizela*
75	2008–09	Olhanense (3)	União de Leiria (1)	Santa Clara*
76	2009–10	Beira-Mar (5)	Portimonense (3)	Feirense*
77	2010–11	Gil Vicente (2)	Feirense (3)	Trofense*
78	2011–12	Estoril Praia (6)	Moreirense (1)	Desportivo das Aves*
79	2012–13	Belenenses (2)	Arouca (1)	Leixões*
80	2013–14	Moreirense (2)	Porto B* (1)	Penafiel
81	2014–15	Tondela (1)	União da Madeira (2)	Chaves*
LigaPro (2015–2020)
82	2015–16	Porto B* (1)	Chaves (1)	Feirense
83	2016–17	Portimonense (2)	Desportivo das Aves (2)	União da Madeira*
84	2017–18	Nacional da Madeira (1)	Santa Clara (1)	Académico de Viseu*
85	2018–19	Paços de Ferreira (4)	Famalicão (2)	Estoril Praia*
86	2019–20	Abandoned due to COVID-19 pandemic (Nacional and Farense promoted with 10 rounds left to play)		
Liga Portugal 2 (2020–present)
87	2020–21	Estoril Praia (7)	Vizela (2)	Arouca
88	2021–22	Rio Ave (4)	Casa Pia (1)	Chaves
89	2022–23	Moreirense (3)	Farense (3)	Estrela da Amadora
90	2023–24	Santa Clara (2)	Nacional da Madeira (1)	AVS
91	2024–25	Tondela (2)	Alverca (2)	Vizela*
92	2025–26	Marítimo (3)	Académico de Viseu (2)	Torreense*

== List of champion clubs by titles won ==
43 clubs have won the second-tier title, including 22 which have won in the professional league era (1990–). The most recent to join the list were Nacional da Madeira (2017–18).

Six teams have at some point held first or joint first place in the number of titles won: Carcavelinhos (1935–1945), Olhanense (1936–1938, 1941–1945), Boavista (1937–1938), Leixões (1938), Estoril Praia (1944–1961, 2012–), and Barreirense (1960–2020).

Where teams in the table are tied for championship wins, they are ordered by earliest title won and then number of runner-up seasons.

Rank	Club	Winners	Runners-up	Winning seasons
1	Estoril Praia	7	2	1941–42, 1943–44, 1945–46, 1974–75, 2003–04, 2011–12, 2020–21
2	Barreirense	6	3	1942–43, 1950–51, 1959–60, 1961–62, 1966–67, 1968–69
3	Beira-Mar	5	2	1960–61, 1964–65, 1970–71, 2005–06, 2009–10
4	Rio Ave	4	1	1985–86, 1995–96, 2002–03, 2021–22
5	Paços de Ferreira	4	0	1990–91, 1999–2000, 2004–05, 2018–19
6	Atlético CP	3	2	1944–45, 1958–59, 1967–68
6	Sporting da Covilhã	3	2	1947–48, 1957–58, 1986–87
6	Olhanense	3	2	1935–36, 1940–41, 2008–09
9	Moreirense	3	1	2001–02, 2013–14, 2022–23
10	Marítimo	3	0	1976–77, 1981–82, 2025–26
11	Boavista	2	3	1936–37, 1949–50
11	Varzim	2	3	1962–63, 1975–76
11	Farense	2	3	1939–40, 1982–83
11	Salgueiros	2	3	1956–57, 1989–90
11	Portimonense	2	3	1978–79, 2016–17
16	Braga	2	2	1946–47, 1963–64
16	Académica de Coimbra	2	2	1948–49, 1972–73
16	Famalicão	2	2	1977–78, 1987–88
16	Tirsense	2	2	1969–70, 1993–94
16	União de Leiria	2	2	1980–81, 1997–98
16	Leixões	2	2	1937–38, 2006–07
16	Belenenses	2	2	1983–84, 2012–13
23	Oriental	2	1	1952–53, 1955–56
23	Gil Vicente	2	1	1998–99, 2010–11
23	Santa Clara	2	1	2000–01, 2023–24
26	Carcavelinhos	2	0	1934–35, 1938–39
26	Tondela	2	0	2014–15, 2024–25
28	Torreense	1	3	1954–55
29	Desportivo das Aves	1	2	1984–85
29	União da Madeira	1	2	1988–89
29	Sporting de Espinho	1	2	1991–92
32	Sanjoanense	1	1	1965–66
32	União de Tomar	1	1	1973–74
32	Leça	1	1	1994–95
32	Campomaiorense	1	1	1996–97
32	Porto B	1	1	2015–16
32	Nacional da Madeira	1	1	2017–18
38	Lusitano de Évora	1	0	1951–52
38	CUF Barreiro	1	0	1953–54
38	União de Coimbra	1	0	1971–72
38	Amora	1	0	1979–80
38	C.F. Estrela da Amadora (1932)	1	0	1992–93
38	Trofense	1	0	2007–08

== Performance by district ==
Clubs from a total of 15 districts have won the second-tier title.

Rank	District Football Associations	Titles	Teams
1	Porto	22	Paços de Ferreira (4), Rio Ave (4), Boavista (2), Varzim (2), Salgueiros (2), Tirsense (2), Leixões (2), Desportivo das Aves (1), Leça (1), Trofense (1), Porto B (1)
2	Lisbon	18	Estoril Praia (7), Atlético CP (3), Carcavelinhos (2), Oriental (2), Belenenses (2), Torreense (1), C.F. Estrela da Amadora (1932) (1)
3	Braga	9	Moreirense (3), Braga (2), Famalicão (2), Gil Vicente (2)
4	Setúbal	8	Barreirense (6), CUF Barreiro (1), Amora (1)
5	Aveiro	7	Beira-Mar (5), Sanjoanense (1), Sporting de Espinho (1)
5	Faro	7	Olhanense (3), Farense (2), Portimonense (2)
7	Madeira	5	Marítimo (3), União da Madeira (1), Nacional da Madeira (1)
8	Coimbra	3	Académica de Coimbra (2), União de Coimbra (1)
8	Castelo Branco	3	Sporting da Covilhã (3)
10	Leiria	2	União de Leiria (2)
10	Ponta Delgada	2	Santa Clara (2)
10	Viseu	2	Tondela (2)
13	Évora	1	Lusitano de Évora (1)
13	Santarém	1	União de Tomar (1)
13	Portalegre	1	Campomaiorense (1)

== See also ==
- List of football clubs in Portugal by major honours won
- List of winners of the Liga 3 and predecessors
