= List of winners of the Liga 3 and predecessors =

Portuguese League (3rd tier)

Terceira Divisão (1947–1990) Segunda Divisão B (1990–2005) Segunda Divisão (2005–2013) Campeonato Nacional de Seniores (2013–2015) Campeonato de Portugal (2015–2021) Liga 3 (2021–present)
- Country
- Portugal
- Founded
- 1947
- Number of teams
- 20 (2025–26 season)
- Current champions
- Amarante (2025–26)
- Most successful club(s)
- Ovarense, Vizela, Sporting da Covilhã, Oliveirense, Varzim, Freamunde, and Cova da Piedade (3 titles each)

A national third tier of Portuguese league football was established in 1947–48 as the Terceira Divisão.

Starting with the 1990–91 season, a new second-tier professional league, initially named Segunda Divisão de Honra, was established. This moved the Terceira Divisão to the fourth tier of Portuguese league football, and Segunda Divisão B was established as the new third-tier league. It was renamed Segunda Divisão in 2005, returning to its previous name from when it was the second tier.

The Campeonato Nacional de Seniores was introduced in 2013 as the new third-level championship, replacing both Segunda Divisão and Terceira Divisão. On 22 October 2015, it was renamed Campeonato de Portugal. The current Liga 3 was created as the new third tier from the 2021–22 season onwards, and the Campeonato de Portugal was demoted one tier.

Cova da Piedade was the first club to be crowned champions, and the competition's record title holders are Ovarense, Vizela, Sporting da Covilhã, Oliveirense, Varzim, Freamunde, and Cova da Piedade with 3 championships each. Almada, Seixal, União de Lamas, Cova da Piedade, Vizela, União de Santarém, Bragança, Portalegrense, and Montijo won the most titles (2) in the Terceira Divisão era, Sporting da Covilhã holds the record with 3 titles in the Segunda Divisão era, while Mafra was the only repeat winner with 2 titles in the Campeonato de Portugal era. As of the 2025–26 season, no team has yet won more than one Liga 3 title.

The current champions of the league are Amarante, having clinched their 1st title in the 2025–26 season.

== List of champions by season ==
- Teams marked with an asterisk (*) were not promoted

Ed.	Season	Champions (number of titles)	Runners-up (number of times)	Third place
Terceira Divisão (1947–1990)
1	1947–48	Cova da Piedade (1)	Académico de Viseu (1)	
2	1948–49	Almada (1)	Tirsense (1)	
3	1949–50	Ovarense (1)	Operário Vilafranquense (1)	
4	1950–51	Juventude de Évora (1)	Sanjoanense (1)	
5	1951–52	Lusitano VRSA (1)	Caldas (1)	
6	1952–53	Vila Real (1)	Farense (1)	
7	1953–54	Coruchense (1)	Académico do Porto* (1)	
8	1954–55	O Elvas (1)	Chaves (1)	
9	1955–56	Almada (2)	Marinhense (1)	
10	1956–57	Serpa (1)	Vila Real (1)	
11	1957–58	Oliveirense (1)	Sacavenense (1)	
12	1958–59	Beira-Mar (1)	Olivais (1)	
13	1959–60	Benfica e Castelo Branco (1)	Sacavenense (2)	
14	1960–61	Seixal (1)	Vila Real (2)	
15	1961–62	Varzim (1)	Luso (1)	
16	1962–63	Os Leões (1)	Famalicão (1)	
17	1963–64	União de Lamas (1)	Almada (1)	
18	1964–65	União de Tomar (1)	Ovarense (1)	
19	1965–66	Montijo (1)	Tirsense (2)	
20	1966–67	Vizela (1)	Tramagal (1)	
21	1967–68	Seixal (2)	Boavista (1)	
22	1968–69	União de Lamas (2)	Farense (2)	
23	1969–70	Olhanense (1)	União de Coimbra (1)	
24	1970–71	Cova da Piedade (2)	Gil Vicente (1)	
25	1971–72	Caldas (1)	Oliveirense (1)	
26	1972–73	Lusitânia Lourosa (1)	Lusitano de Évora (1)	
27	1973–74	Paços de Ferreira (1)	Estrela de Portalegre (1)	
28	1974–75	União de Santarém (1)	Sporting da Covilhã (1)	
29	1975–76	Portalegrense (1)	União de Coimbra (2)	
30	1976–77	Rio Ave (1)	Cova da Piedade (1)	
31	1977–78	Sacavenense (1)	Desportivo das Aves (1)	
32	1978–79	Bragança (1)	Oriental (1)	
33	1979–80	Vasco da Gama (1)	Sanjoanense (2)	
34	1980–81	União de Coimbra (1)	O Elvas (1)	
35	1981–82	Vizela (2)	Atlético CP (1)	
36	1982–83	Esperança de Lagos (1)	Guarda (1)	
37	1983–84	Championship play-off was canceled		
38	1984–85	União de Santarém (2)	Académico de Viseu (2)	
39	1985–86	Bragança (2)	União de Santiago (1)	
40	1986–87	Louletano (1)	Marco (1)	
41	1987–88	Portalegrense (2)	Luso (2)	
42	1988–89	Mirense (1)	Famalicão (2)	
43	1989–90	Montijo (2)	Lousada (1)	
Segunda Divisão B (1990–2005)
44	1990–91	Ovarense (2)	Rio Ave (1)	Olhanense
45	1991–92	Campomaiorense (1)	Felgueiras (1)	Amora
46	1992–93	Leça (1)	Portimonense (1)	Académico de Viseu
47	1993–94	Amora (1)	Feirense (1)	União de Lamas
48	1994–95	Moreirense (1)	Alverca (1)	Académico de Viseu
49	1995–96	Varzim (2)	Sporting da Covilhã (2)	Beja
50	1996–97	Maia (1)	Torreense (1)	Nacional da Madeira
51	1997–98	Santa Clara (1)	Esposende (1)	Naval 1º Maio
52	1998–99	Freamunde (1)	No championship play-off took place, with each season's 3 regional winners being recognized joint league champions.	
52	1998–99	Sporting da Covilhã (1)	No championship play-off took place, with each season's 3 regional winners being recognized joint league champions.	
52	1998–99	Imortal (1)	No championship play-off took place, with each season's 3 regional winners being recognized joint league champions.	
53	1999–2000	Marco (1)	No championship play-off took place, with each season's 3 regional winners being recognized joint league champions.	
53	1999–2000	Ovarense (3)	No championship play-off took place, with each season's 3 regional winners being recognized joint league champions.	
53	1999–2000	Nacional da Madeira (1)	No championship play-off took place, with each season's 3 regional winners being recognized joint league champions.	
54	2000–01	Moreirense (2)	No championship play-off took place, with each season's 3 regional winners being recognized joint league champions.	
54	2000–01	Oliveirense (2)	No championship play-off took place, with each season's 3 regional winners being recognized joint league champions.	
54	2000–01	Portimonense (1)	No championship play-off took place, with each season's 3 regional winners being recognized joint league champions.	
55	2001–02	Marco (2)	No championship play-off took place, with each season's 3 regional winners being recognized joint league champions.	
55	2001–02	Sporting da Covilhã (2)	No championship play-off took place, with each season's 3 regional winners being recognized joint league champions.	
55	2001–02	União da Madeira (1)	No championship play-off took place, with each season's 3 regional winners being recognized joint league champions.	
56	2002–03	Leixões (1)	No championship play-off took place, with each season's 3 regional winners being recognized joint league champions.	
56	2002–03	Feirense (1)	No championship play-off took place, with each season's 3 regional winners being recognized joint league champions.	
56	2002–03	Estoril Praia (1)	No championship play-off took place, with each season's 3 regional winners being recognized joint league champions.	
57	2003–04	Gondomar (1)	No championship play-off took place, with each season's 3 regional winners being recognized joint league champions.	
57	2003–04	Sporting de Espinho (1)	No championship play-off took place, with each season's 3 regional winners being recognized joint league champions.	
57	2003–04	Olhanense (2)	No championship play-off took place, with each season's 3 regional winners being recognized joint league champions.	
58	2004–05	Vizela (3)	No championship play-off took place, with each season's 3 regional winners being recognized joint league champions.	
58	2004–05	Sporting da Covilhã (3)	No championship play-off took place, with each season's 3 regional winners being recognized joint league champions.	
58	2004–05	Barreirense (1)	No championship play-off took place, with each season's 3 regional winners being recognized joint league champions.	
Segunda Divisão (2005–2013)
59	2005–06	Olivais e Moscavide (1)	Trofense (1)	
60	2006–07	Freamunde (2)	Fátima (1)	
61	2007–08	Oliveirense (3)	Sporting da Covilhã (3)	
62	2008–09	Fátima (1)	Chaves (2)	
63	2009–10	Arouca (1)	Moreirense (1)	União da Madeira*
64	2010–11	União da Madeira (2)	Atlético CP (2)	Padroense*
65	2011–12	Varzim* (Note: Varzim was excluded from 2012–13 Segunda Liga for failing to meet the requirements to join professional competitions.) (3)	Tondela (1)	Fátima*
66	2012–13	Chaves (1)	Farense (3)	Académico de Viseu
Campeonato Nacional de Seniores (2013–2015)
67	2013–14	Freamunde (3)	Oriental (2)	
68	2014–15	Mafra (1)	Famalicão (3)	
Campeonato de Portugal (2015–2021)
69	2015–16	Cova da Piedade (3)	Vizela (1)	
70	2016–17	Real (1)	Oliveirense (2)	
71	2017–18	Mafra (2)	Farense (4)	
72	2018–19	Casa Pia (1)	Vilafranquense (1)	
73	2019–20	Abandoned due to COVID-19 pandemic (Vizela and Arouca were promoted for being the two teams with the most points at the time of the suspension)		
74	2020–21	Trofense (1)	Estrela da Amadora (1)	
Liga 3 (2021–present)
75	2021–22	Torreense (1)	Oliveirense (3)	
76	2022–23	União de Leiria (1)	Belenenses (1)	
77	2023–24	Alverca (1)	Felgueiras (2006) (1)	Lusitânia Lourosa*
78	2024–25	Lusitânia Lourosa (2)	Sporting B (1)	Belenenses*
79	2025–26	Amarante (1)	Académica de Coimbra (1)	Belenenses*

== List of champion clubs by titles won ==
64 clubs have won the third-tier title, including 38 which have won since professional leagues were introduced (1990–). The most recent to join the list were Amarante (2025–26).

19 teams have at some point held first or joint first place in the number of titles won: Cova da Piedade (1948–1955, 2016–), Almada (1949–1999), Ovarense (1950–1955, 1991–), Juventude de Évora (1951–1955), Lusitano VRSA (1952–1955), Vila Real (1953–1955), Coruchense (1954–1955), O Elvas (1955), Seixal (1968–1999), União de Lamas (1969–1999), Vizela (1982–1999, 2005–), União de Santarém (1985–1999), Bragança (1986–1999), Portalegrense (1988–1999), Montijo (1990–1999), Varzim (1996–1999, 2012–), Sporting da Covilhã (2005–), Oliveirense (2008–), and Freamunde (2014–).

Where teams in the table are tied for championship wins, they are ordered by earliest title won and then number of runner-up seasons.

Rank	Club	Winners	Runners-up	Winning seasons
1	Sporting da Covilhã	3	3	1998–99, 2001–02, 2004–05
1	Oliveirense	3	3	1957–58, 2000–01, 2007–08
3	Ovarense	3	1	1949–50, 1990–91, 1999–2000
3	Vizela	3	1	1966–67, 1981–82, 2004–05
3	Cova da Piedade	3	1	1947–48, 1970–71, 2015–16
6	Varzim	3	0	1961–62, 1995–96, 2011–12
6	Freamunde	3	0	1998–99, 2006–07, 2013–14
8	Almada	2	1	1948–49, 1955–56
8	Moreirense	2	1	1994–95, 2000–01
8	Marco	2	1	1999–2000, 2001–02
11	Seixal	2	0	1960–61, 1967–68
11	União de Lamas	2	0	1963–64, 1968–69
11	União de Santarém	2	0	1974–75, 1984–85
11	Bragança	2	0	1978–79, 1985–86
11	Portalegrense	2	0	1975–76, 1987–88
11	Montijo	2	0	1965–66, 1989–90
11	Olhanense	2	0	1969–70, 2003–04
11	União da Madeira	2	0	2001–02, 2010–11
11	Mafra	2	0	2014–15, 2017–18
11	Lusitânia Lourosa	2	0	1972–73, 2024–25
21	Vila Real	1	2	1952–53
21	Sacavenense	1	2	1977–78
21	União de Coimbra	1	2	1980–81
21	Chaves	1	2	2012–13
25	O Elvas	1	1	1954–55
25	Caldas	1	1	1971–72
25	Rio Ave	1	1	1976–77
25	Portimonense	1	1	2000–01
25	Feirense	1	1	2002–03
25	Fátima	1	1	2008–09
25	Trofense	1	1	2020–21
25	Torreense	1	1	2021–22
25	Alverca	1	1	2023–24
34	Juventude de Évora	1	0	1950–51
34	Lusitano VRSA	1	0	1951–52
34	Coruchense	1	0	1953–54
34	Serpa	1	0	1956–57
34	Beira-Mar	1	0	1958–59
34	Benfica e Castelo Branco	1	0	1959–60
34	Os Leões	1	0	1962–63
34	União de Tomar	1	0	1964–65
34	Paços de Ferreira	1	0	1973–74
34	Vasco da Gama	1	0	1979–80
34	Esperança de Lagos	1	0	1982–83
34	Louletano	1	0	1986–87
34	Mirense	1	0	1988–89
34	Campomaiorense	1	0	1991–92
34	Leça	1	0	1992–93
34	Amora	1	0	1993–94
34	Maia	1	0	1996–97
34	Santa Clara	1	0	1997–98
34	Imortal	1	0	1998–99
34	Nacional da Madeira	1	0	1999–2000
34	Leixões	1	0	2002–03
34	Estoril Praia	1	0	2002–03
34	Gondomar	1	0	2003–04
34	Sporting de Espinho	1	0	2003–04
34	Barreirense	1	0	2004–05
34	Olivais e Moscavide	1	0	2005–06
34	Arouca	1	0	2009–10
34	Real	1	0	2016–17
34	Casa Pia	1	0	2018–19
34	União de Leiria	1	0	2022–23
34	Amarante	1	0	2025–26

== Performance by district ==
Clubs from a total of 18 districts have won the second-tier title.

Rank	District Football Associations	Titles	Teams
1	Porto	16	Varzim (3), Freamunde (3), Marco (2), Paços de Ferreira (1), Rio Ave (1), Leça (1), Maia (1), Leixões (1), Gondomar (1), Trofense (1), Amarante (1)
2	Aveiro	14	Ovarense (3), Oliveirense (3), União de Lamas (2), Lusitânia Lourosa (2), Beira-Mar (1), Feirense (1), Sporting de Espinho (1), Arouca (1)
3	Setúbal	12	Cova da Piedade (3), Almada (2), Seixal (2), Montijo (2), Vasco da Gama (1), Amora (1), Barreirense (1)
4	Lisbon	9	Mafra (2), Sacavenense (1), Estoril Praia (1), Olivais e Moscavide (1), Real (1), Casa Pia (1), Torreense (1), Alverca (1)
5	Faro	7	Olhanense (2), Lusitano VRSA (1), Esperança de Lagos (1), Louletano (1), Imortal (1), Portimonense (1)
6	Braga	5	Vizela (3), Moreirense (2)
6	Santarém	5	União de Santarém (2), Coruchense (1), União de Tomar (1), Fátima (1)
8	Portalegre	4	Portalegrense (2), O Elvas (1), Campomaiorense (1)
8	Castelo Branco	4	Sporting da Covilhã (3), Benfica e Castelo Branco (1)
10	Madeira	3	União da Madeira (2), Nacional da Madeira (1)
10	Leiria	3	Caldas (1), Mirense (1), União de Leiria (1)
12	Bragança	2	Bragança (2)
12	Vila Real	2	Vila Real (1), Chaves (1)
14	Évora	1	Juventude de Évora (1)
14	Beja	1	Serpa (1)
14	Angra do Heroísmo	1	Os Leões (1)
14	Coimbra	1	União de Coimbra (1)
14	Ponta Delgada	1	Santa Clara (1)

== See also ==
- List of football clubs in Portugal by major honours won
- List of winners of the Liga Portugal 2 and predecessors
