= 1946–47 Segunda Divisão =

Portuguese Second Division season

Segunda Divisão
- Season: 1946–47
- Champions: Braga
- Promoted: Braga; Lusitano
- Relegated: Flaviense; Leça; Fafe; Espinho; Académico de Viseu; Marialvas; Torreense; Rossiense; Arroios; Covilhã; Atlético Reguengos

The 1946-47 Segunda Divisão is the 13th season of Segunda Divisão ~ Portuguese Second Division season

== Table ==
=== Group 1 ===
Pos	Team	Pld	W	D	L	GF	GA	GD	Pts	Qualification or relegation
1	Vila Real (P)	10	8	0	2	63	14	+49	16	Qualification to Championship Play-off
2	Celoricense	10	5	4	1	25	18	+7	14	
3	Flaviense	10	4	2	4	25	24	+1	10	Relegated to 1947-48 Segunda Divisão
4	Flávia	10	4	2	4	20	29	−9	10	
5	Mirandela	10	3	1	6	23	36	−13	7	
6	Lamego	10	1	1	8	8	43	−35	3	

Updated to match(es) played on unknown. Source: ZeroZero
(P) Promoted

=== Group 2 ===
Pos	Team	Pld	W	D	L	GF	GA	GD	Pts	Qualification or relegation
1	Leixões (P)	10	9	0	1	64	8	+56	18	Qualification to Championship Play-off
2	Vianense	10	7	0	3	21	10	+11	14	
3	Leça	10	7	0	3	31	21	+10	14	Relegated to 1947-48 Terceira Divisão
4	Monção	10	5	0	5	20	22	−2	10	
5	Ramaldense	10	1	1	8	17	31	−14	3	
6	Paredes	10	0	1	9	6	67	−61	1	

Updated to match(es) played on unknown. Source: ZeroZero
(P) Promoted

=== Group 3 ===
Pos	Team	Pld	W	D	L	GF	GA	GD	Pts	Qualification or relegation
1	Fafe (Note: Sporting Fafe play the playoffs, but are relegated to form Terceira Divisão) (P)	10	9	1	0	53	11	+42	19	Qualification to Championship Play-off/Relegated to 1947–48 Terceira Divisão
2	Avintes	10	6	0	4	25	25	0	12	
3	Aves	10	5	0	5	27	25	+2	10	
4	Salgueiros	10	3	2	5	28	24	+4	8	
5	Gaia	10	3	1	6	15	36	−21	7	
6	Oliveira do Douro	10	1	2	7	9	36	−27	4	

Updated to match(es) played on unknown. Source: ZeroZero
(P) Promoted

=== Group 4 ===
Pos	Team	Pld	W	D	L	GF	GA	GD	Pts	Qualification or relegation
1	Braga (P)	10	9	0	1	48	12	+36	18	Qualification to Championship Play-off
2	Académico	10	8	1	1	47	23	+24	17	
3	Candal	10	4	1	5	16	22	−6	9	
4	Gil Vicente	10	4	1	5	33	30	+3	9	
5	Ermesinde	10	2	1	7	19	37	−18	5	
6	Infesta	10	0	2	8	10	49	−39	2	

Updated to match(es) played on unknown. Source: ZeroZero
(P) Promoted

=== Group 5 ===
Pos	Team	Pld	W	D	L	GF	GA	GD	Pts	Qualification or relegation
1	Beira-Mar (P)	10	9	0	1	50	9	+41	18	Qualification to Championship Play-off
2	Espinho	10	6	1	3	39	14	+25	13	Relegation to 1947-48 Terceira Divisão
3	Ovarense	10	4	2	4	20	16	+4	10	
4	Académico de Viseu	10	4	2	4	15	35	−20	10	Relegation to 1947-48 Terceira Divisão
5	Conimbricense	10	3	1	6	15	34	−19	7	
6	Viseu e Benfica	10	1	0	9	10	41	−31	2	

Updated to match(es) played on unknown. Source: ZeroZero
(P) Promoted

=== Group 6 ===
Pos	Team	Pld	W	D	L	GF	GA	GD	Pts	Qualification or relegation
1	Oliveirense (P)	10	8	1	1	46	11	+35	17	Qualification to Championship Play-off
2	União de Coimbra	10	8	0	2	49	15	+34	16	
3	Naval	10	5	1	4	24	26	−2	11	
4	União de Lamas	10	4	0	6	24	27	−3	8	
5	Anadia	10	2	1	7	13	42	−29	5	
6	Marialvas	10	1	1	8	10	45	−35	3	Relegation to 1947-48 Terceira Divisão

Updated to match(es) played on unknown. Source: ZeroZero
(P) Promoted

=== Group 7 ===
Pos	Team	Pld	W	D	L	GF	GA	GD	Pts	Qualification or relegation
1	Oriental (P)	10	10	0	0	60	7	+53	20	Qualification to Championship Play-off
2	Ferroviários	10	5	2	3	34	20	+14	12	
3	Marinhense	10	5	1	4	17	22	−5	11	
4	Alcobaça	10	5	0	5	25	31	−6	10	
5	Leões Santarém	10	2	0	8	13	37	−24	4	
6	Operário de Santarém	10	1	1	8	14	46	−32	3	

Updated to match(es) played on unknown. Source: ZeroZero
(P) Promoted

=== Group 8 ===
Pos	Team	Pld	W	D	L	GF	GA	GD	Pts	Qualification or relegation
1	Sacavanense (P)	10	7	2	1	26	10	+16	16	Qualification to Championship Play-off
2	Operário Vilafranquense	10	6	1	3	20	7	+13	13	
3	Bombarralense	10	4	2	4	16	17	−1	10	
4	Matrena	10	3	2	5	21	25	−4	8	
5	Os Nazarenos	10	3	1	6	14	25	−11	7	
6	Alhandra	10	3	0	7	14	27	−13	6	

Updated to match(es) played on unknown. Source: ZeroZero
(P) Promoted

=== Group 9 ===
Pos	Team	Pld	W	D	L	GF	GA	GD	Pts	Qualification or relegation
1	Torreense (Note: Torreeense Play the play-offs, but in the final of league are relegated to make Terceira Divisão) (P)	8	6	1	1	20	8	+12	13	Qualification to Championship Play-off/Relegation to 1947-48 Terceira Divisão
2	Casa Pia	8	6	0	2	24	12	+12	12	
3	Águia Vilafranquense	8	4	1	3	17	16	+1	9	
4	Peniche	8	1	1	6	9	20	−11	3	
5	Rossiense	8	1	1	6	2	16	−14	3	Relegation to 1947-48 Terceira Divisão

Updated to match(es) played on unknown. Source: ZeroZero
(P) Promoted

=== Group 10 ===
Pos	Team	Pld	W	D	L	GF	GA	GD	Pts	Qualification or relegation
1	Onze Unidos (P)	8	8	0	0	38	10	+28	16	Qualification to Championship Play-off
2	Futebol Benfica	8	5	0	3	19	13	+6	10	
3	Seixal	8	3	0	5	18	21	−3	6	
4	Amora	8	2	0	6	11	20	−9	4	
5	Operário Lisboa	8	2	0	6	10	32	−22	4	

Updated to match(es) played on unknown. Source: ZeroZero
(P) Promoted

=== Group 11 ===
Pos	Team	Pld	W	D	L	GF	GA	GD	Pts	Qualification or relegation
1	C.U.F.	0	0	0	0	0	0	0	0	Qualification to Championship Play-off
2	Almada	8	4	4	0	25	13	+12	12	
3	Ginásio do Sul	8	2	2	4	9	23	−14	6	
4	Arroios	8	2	1	5	21	28	−7	5	Relegation to 1947-48 Terceira Divisão
5	União de Sesimbra	8	1	2	5	17	39	−22	4	

Updated to match(es) played on unknown. Source: ZeroZero

=== Group 12 ===
Pos	Team	Pld	W	D	L	GF	GA	GD	Pts	Qualification or relegation
1	Barreirense (P)	10	10	0	0	50	8	+42	20	Qualification to Championship Play-off
2	Palmelense	10	5	2	3	26	29	−3	12	
3	Luso F.C.	10	3	4	3	21	23	−2	10	
4	Aldegalense	10	4	1	5	24	20	+4	9	
5	União Montemor	10	2	3	5	16	34	−18	7	
6	Lusitano Évora	10	0	2	8	10	33	−23	2	

Updated to match(es) played on unknown. Source: ZeroZero
(P) Promoted

=== Group 13 ===
Pos	Team	Pld	W	D	L	GF	GA	GD	Pts	Qualification or relegation
1	Covilhã (Note: Covilhã play the play-offs, but in the final of league are relegated to make Terceira Divisão) (P)	8	7	0	1	37	8	+29	14	Qualification to Championship Play-off/Relegated to 1947-48 Terceira Divisão
2	Benfica Castelo Branco	8	5	1	2	23	10	+13	11	
3	Covilhanense	8	4	1	3	18	16	+2	9	
4	Egitaniense	8	1	2	5	24	20	+4	4	
5	Os Gouveenses	8	0	2	6	16	34	−18	2	
6	Os Pinhelenses	0	0	0	0	0	0	0	0	Pinhelenses was expelled of Segunda Divisão

Updated to match(es) played on unknown. Source:
(P) Promoted

=== Group 14 ===
Pos	Team	Pld	W	D	L	GF	GA	GD	Pts	Qualification or relegation
1	Os Elvenses (P)	6	6	0	0	27	1	+26	12	Qualification to Championship Play-off
2	Juventude de Évora	6	3	1	2	12	11	+1	7	
3	Portalegrense	6	2	1	3	12	16	−4	5	
4	Campomaiorense	6	0	0	6	4	27	−23	0	

Updated to match(es) played on unknown. Source:
(P) Promoted

=== Group 15 ===
Pos	Team	Pld	W	D	L	GF	GA	GD	Pts	Qualification or relegation
1	Barreiro (P)	10	9	1	0	85	11	+74	19	Qualification to Championship Play-off
2	Atlético Reguengos	10	4	3	3	22	23	−1	11	Relegation to 1947-48 Terceira Divisão
3	Moura	10	5	0	5	17	29	−12	10	
4	União de Santiago	10	3	2	5	22	29	−7	8	
5	Luso Beja	10	3	2	5	18	27	−9	8	
6	Piense	10	2	0	8	10	55	−45	4	

Updated to match(es) played on unknown. Source:
(P) Promoted

=== Group 16 ===
Pos	Team	Pld	W	D	L	GF	GA	GD	Pts	Qualification or relegation
1	Lusitano VRSA (P)	6	5	1	0	23	8	+15	11	Qualification to Championship Play-off
2	Portimonense	6	3	2	1	15	9	+6	8	
3	Desportivo Faro	6	2	1	3	12	19	−7	5	
4	Louletano	0	0	0	0	0	0	0	0	
5	Boa Esperança Portimonense	6	0	0	6	7	21	−14	0	

Updated to match(es) played on unknown. Source: ZeroZero
(P) Promoted

== Playoff phases ==
=== Group A ===
Team 1	Score	Team 2
(NO) Braga	2–0	Sporting Fafe (NO)
(NO) Vila Real	3–0	Leixões (NO)

=== Group B ===
Team 1	Score	Team 2
(LI) Oriental	4–0	Sacavanense (LI)
(NO) Oliveirense	3–1	Beira Mar (CE)

=== Group C ===
Team 1	Score	Team 2
(LI) C.U.F.	2–1	Barreirense (LI)
(LI) Onze Unidos	5–2	Torreense (CE)

=== Group D ===
Team 1	Score	Team 2
(AL) Lusitano VRSA	3–0	Barreirense (LI)
(CE) Covilhã	1–0	Os Elvenses (ALE)

=== Final ===
Team 1	Score	Team 2
(AL) Lusitano VRSA	2–1	Covilhã (CE)
(LI) Onze Unidos	2–1	CUF Barreiro (LI)
(NO) Oliveirense	2–1	Oriental (LI)
(NO) Braga	4–3	Vila Real (NO)

(NO) – Norte
(CE) – Centro
(LI) – Lisboa
(ALE) – Alentejo
(AL) – Algarve

== Final phase ==
Pos	Team	Pld	W	D	L	GF	GA	GD	Pts	Qualification or relegation
1	Braga (C, P)	6	4	0	2	11	3	+8	8	Promoted to 1947–48 Primeira Divisão
2	Lusitano (P)	6	4	0	2	10	7	+3	8	Promoted to 1947–48 Primeira Divisão
3	Oliveirense	6	3	0	3	8	12	−4	6	
4	Onze Unidos	6	1	0	5	10	17	−7	2	

Updated to match(es) played on unknown. Source: ZeroZero
(C) Champions; (P) Promoted
