= 1981–82 Segunda Divisão =

48th season of second-tier football league in Portugal

Segunda Divisão
- Season: 1981–82
- Champions: C.S. Marítimo
- Promoted: C.S. Marítimo; Varzim S.C.; G.C. Alcobaça

The 1981–82 Segunda Divisão season was the 48th season of recognised second-tier football in Portugal.

== Overview ==
The league was contested by 48 teams in 3 divisions with C.S. Marítimo, Varzim S.C. and G.C. Alcobaça winning the respective divisional competitions and gaining promotion to the Primeira Liga. The overall championship was won by C.S. Marítimo.

== League standings ==
=== Segunda Divisão - Zona Norte ===
Pos	Team	Pld	W	D	L	GF	GA	GD	Pts	Qualification or relegation
1	Varzim S.C.	30	17	8	5	59	18	+41	42	Championship Play-off
2	S.C. Salgueiros	30	16	9	5	42	18	+24	41	Promotion Play-off
3	A.D. Sanjoanense	30	14	11	5	40	19	+21	39	
4	F.C. Paços de Ferreira	30	13	12	5	39	23	+16	38	
5	C.D. Feirense	30	14	9	7	35	27	+8	37	
6	Leixões S.C.	30	11	9	10	36	35	+1	31	
7	GD Bragança	30	13	5	12	34	36	−2	31	
8	Gil Vicente F.C.	30	12	6	12	42	31	+11	30	
9	G.D. Chaves	30	12	6	12	38	43	−5	30	
10	Leça F.C.	30	11	7	12	34	35	−1	29	
11	F.C. Famalicão	30	10	9	11	33	34	−1	29	
12	C.A. Valdevez	30	11	6	13	34	40	−6	28	
13	C.F. União de Lamas	30	8	12	10	27	34	−7	27	Relegation to Terceira Divisão
14	AD Fafe	30	8	8	14	27	36	−9	24	Relegation to Terceira Divisão
15	Amarante FC	30	4	6	20	23	60	−37	14	Relegation to Terceira Divisão
16	Neves F.C.	30	1	7	22	15	69	−54	9	Relegation to Terceira Divisão

=== Segunda Divisão - Zona Centro ===
Pos	Team	Pld	W	D	L	GF	GA	GD	Pts	Qualification or relegation
1	G.C. Alcobaça	30	21	4	5	58	24	+34	46	Championship Play-off
2	Académica de Coimbra	30	18	10	2	59	13	+46	46	Promotion Play-off
3	R.D. Águeda	30	21	2	7	54	23	+31	44	
4	S.C. Beira-Mar	30	13	10	7	46	32	+14	36	
5	Oliveira do Bairro S.C.	30	12	11	7	50	30	+20	35	
6	G.D. Peniche	30	13	6	11	32	28	+4	32	
7	U.D. Rio Maior	30	11	9	10	27	28	−1	31	
8	U.D. Oliveirense	30	11	8	11	31	33	−2	30	
9	Sport Benfica e Castelo Branco	30	12	6	12	39	37	+2	30	
10	C.F. União de Coimbra	30	9	9	12	38	33	+5	27	
11	S.C. Covilhã	30	11	4	15	34	43	−9	26	
12	G.D. Nazarenos	30	8	10	12	28	31	−3	26	
13	A.D. Guarda	30	9	6	15	23	45	−22	24	Relegation to Terceira Divisão
14	C.D. Portalegrense	30	6	5	19	19	50	−31	17	Relegation to Terceira Divisão
15	União de Santarém	30	4	9	17	13	60	−47	17	Relegation to Terceira Divisão
16	S.L. Cartaxo	30	5	3	22	23	64	−41	13	Relegation to Terceira Divisão

=== Segunda Divisão - Zona Sul ===
Pos	Team	Pld	W	D	L	GF	GA	GD	Pts	Qualification or relegation
1	C.S. Marítimo	30	18	6	6	55	23	+32	42	Championship Play-off
2	S.C. Farense	30	16	7	7	46	25	+21	39	Promotion Play-off
3	Lusitano de Évora	30	15	6	9	42	29	+13	36	
4	S.G. Sacavenense	30	13	7	10	38	36	+2	33	
5	Vasco da Gama A.C.	30	14	5	11	45	41	+4	33	
6	Juventude de Évora	30	13	6	11	45	47	−2	32	
7	F.C. Barreirense	30	11	8	11	34	35	−1	30	
8	C.F. União	30	10	9	11	37	43	−6	29	
9	G.D. Quimigal	30	10	8	12	29	31	−2	28	
10	C.D. Nacional	30	9	10	11	24	28	−4	28	
11	O Elvas C.A.D.	30	7	13	10	22	31	−9	27	
12	C.D. Cova da Piedade	30	9	9	12	27	40	−13	27	
13	C.F. Estrela da Amadora	30	7	13	10	20	22	−2	27	Relegation to Terceira Divisão
14	S.C. Lusitânia	30	9	8	13	36	37	−1	26	Relegation to Terceira Divisão
15	CF Esperança de Lagos	30	10	4	16	36	47	−11	24	Relegation to Terceira Divisão
16	C.D. Montijo	30	6	7	17	27	48	−21	19	Relegation to Terceira Divisão

== Play-offs ==
=== Championship play-off ===
Pos	Team	Pld	W	D	L	GF	GA	GD	Pts	Promotion
1	C.S. Marítimo (C)	4	3	0	1	8	4	+4	6	Promotion to Primeira Divisão
2	Varzim S.C.	4	3	0	1	4	2	+2	6	Promotion to Primeira Divisão
3	G.C. Alcobaça	4	0	0	4	2	8	−6	0	Promotion to Primeira Divisão

(C) Champions

=== Promotion play-off ===
Pos	Team	Pld	W	D	L	GF	GA	GD	Pts	Promotion
1	S.C. Salgueiros (P)	6	3	1	2	8	9	−1	7	Promotion to Primeira Divisão
2	F.C. Penafiel (P)	6	2	2	2	5	4	+1	6	Promotion to Primeira Divisão
3	Académica de Coimbra	6	3	0	3	8	11	−3	6	
4	S.C. Farense	6	2	1	3	12	9	+3	5	

(P) Promoted
