= 1980–81 Segunda Divisão =

47th season of second-tier football league in Portugal

Segunda Divisão
- Season: 1980–81
- Champions: U.D. Leiria; 1st title
- Promoted: Rio Ave F.C.; U.D. Leiria; G.D. Estoril Praia
- Relegated: G.D. Riopele; F.C. Vizela; SC Mirandela; Ermesinde S.C.; Sport Viseu e Benfica; S.C.U. Torreense; Caldas S.C.; S.C. Estrela Portalegre; C.D. Beja; Odivelas F.C.; C. Oriental Lisboa; Silves F.C.

The 1980–81 Segunda Divisão season was the 47th season of recognised second-tier football in Portugal.

== Overview ==
The league was contested by 48 teams in 3 divisions with Rio Ave F.C., U.D. Leiria, and G.D. Estoril Praia winning the respective divisional competitions and gaining promotion to the Primeira Liga. The overall championship was won by U.D. Leiria.

== League standings ==
=== Segunda Divisão - Zona Norte ===
| Pos | Team | Pld | W | D | L | GF | GA | GD | Pts | Qualification or relegation |
|---|---|---|---|---|---|---|---|---|---|---|
| 1 | Rio Ave F.C. | 30 | 16 | 10 | 4 | 43 | 17 | +26 | 42 | Championship Play-off |
| 2 | Leixões S.C. | 30 | 17 | 6 | 7 | 58 | 29 | +29 | 40 | Promotion Play-off |
| 3 | F.C. Paços de Ferreira | 30 | 13 | 9 | 8 | 36 | 33 | +3 | 35 | |
| 4 | Gil Vicente F.C. | 30 | 11 | 11 | 8 | 30 | 26 | +4 | 33 | |
| 5 | G.D. Chaves | 30 | 11 | 11 | 8 | 31 | 24 | +7 | 33 | |
| 6 | A.D. Sanjoanense | 30 | 10 | 13 | 7 | 30 | 19 | +11 | 33 | |
| 7 | GD Bragança | 30 | 9 | 14 | 7 | 22 | 19 | +3 | 32 | |
| 8 | S.C. Salgueiros | 30 | 10 | 11 | 9 | 31 | 29 | +2 | 31 | |
| 9 | C.F. União de Lamas | 30 | 9 | 13 | 8 | 23 | 25 | −2 | 31 | |
| 10 | AD Fafe | 30 | 10 | 10 | 10 | 27 | 32 | −5 | 30 | |
| 11 | Amarante FC | 30 | 10 | 9 | 11 | 31 | 35 | −4 | 29 | |
| 12 | F.C. Famalicão | 30 | 9 | 10 | 11 | 28 | 28 | 0 | 28 | |
| 13 | G.D. Riopele | 30 | 9 | 9 | 12 | 25 | 27 | −2 | 27 | Relegation to Terceira Divisão |
| 14 | F.C. Vizela | 30 | 6 | 10 | 14 | 30 | 48 | −18 | 22 | Relegation to Terceira Divisão |
| 15 | SC Mirandela | 30 | 4 | 11 | 15 | 21 | 43 | −22 | 19 | Relegation to Terceira Divisão |
| 16 | Ermesinde S.C. | 30 | 3 | 9 | 18 | 19 | 51 | −32 | 15 | Relegation to Terceira Divisão |

=== Segunda Divisão - Zona Centro ===
| Pos | Team | Pld | W | D | L | GF | GA | GD | Pts | Qualification or relegation |
|---|---|---|---|---|---|---|---|---|---|---|
| 1 | U.D. Leiria | 30 | 19 | 7 | 4 | 56 | 21 | +35 | 45 | Championship Play-off |
| 2 | G.D. Nazarenos | 30 | 17 | 5 | 8 | 38 | 25 | +13 | 39 | Promotion Play-off |
| 3 | Oliveira do Bairro S.C. | 30 | 11 | 14 | 5 | 38 | 30 | +8 | 36 | |
| 4 | R.D. Águeda | 30 | 14 | 7 | 9 | 39 | 24 | +15 | 35 | |
| 5 | S.C. Beira-Mar | 30 | 13 | 8 | 9 | 45 | 32 | +13 | 34 | |
| 6 | G.C. Alcobaça | 30 | 13 | 8 | 9 | 50 | 34 | +16 | 34 | |
| 7 | S.C. Covilhã | 30 | 11 | 9 | 10 | 35 | 28 | +7 | 31 | |
| 8 | União de Santarém | 30 | 10 | 8 | 12 | 26 | 29 | −3 | 28 | |
| 9 | U.D. Oliveirense | 30 | 8 | 12 | 10 | 27 | 30 | −3 | 28 | |
| 10 | S.L. Cartaxo | 30 | 10 | 7 | 13 | 39 | 48 | −9 | 27 | |
| 11 | C.D. Portalegrense | 30 | 10 | 7 | 13 | 28 | 37 | −9 | 27 | |
| 12 | Sport Benfica e Castelo Branco | 30 | 8 | 10 | 12 | 26 | 37 | −11 | 26 | |
| 13 | Sport Viseu e Benfica | 30 | 6 | 13 | 11 | 22 | 38 | −16 | 25 | Relegation to Terceira Divisão |
| 14 | S.C.U. Torreense | 30 | 9 | 5 | 16 | 32 | 47 | −15 | 23 | Relegation to Terceira Divisão |
| 15 | Caldas S.C. | 30 | 6 | 10 | 14 | 27 | 40 | −13 | 22 | Relegation to Terceira Divisão |
| 16 | S.C. Estrela Portalegre | 30 | 7 | 6 | 17 | 18 | 46 | −28 | 20 | Relegation to Terceira Divisão |

=== Segunda Divisão - Zona Sul ===
| Pos | Team | Pld | W | D | L | GF | GA | GD | Pts | Qualification or relegation |
|---|---|---|---|---|---|---|---|---|---|---|
| 1 | G.D. Estoril Praia | 30 | 17 | 9 | 4 | 48 | 20 | +28 | 43 | Championship Play-off |
| 2 | Juventude de Évora | 30 | 17 | 5 | 8 | 43 | 27 | +16 | 39 | Promotion Play-off |
| 3 | C.D. Nacional | 30 | 13 | 8 | 9 | 35 | 34 | +1 | 34 | |
| 4 | C.D. Montijo | 30 | 10 | 14 | 6 | 21 | 17 | +4 | 34 | |
| 5 | Vasco da Gama A.C. | 30 | 14 | 6 | 10 | 42 | 29 | +13 | 34 | |
| 6 | S.C. Lusitânia | 30 | 11 | 10 | 9 | 26 | 25 | +1 | 32 | |
| 7 | C.F. Estrela da Amadora | 30 | 13 | 4 | 13 | 33 | 31 | +2 | 30 | |
| 8 | S.G. Sacavenense | 30 | 11 | 8 | 11 | 27 | 31 | −4 | 30 | |
| 9 | Lusitano de Évora | 30 | 10 | 10 | 10 | 31 | 26 | +5 | 30 | |
| 10 | G.D. Quimigal | 30 | 10 | 9 | 11 | 31 | 30 | +1 | 29 | |
| 11 | S.C. Farense | 30 | 8 | 12 | 10 | 29 | 29 | 0 | 28 | |
| 12 | C.D. Cova da Piedade | 30 | 9 | 9 | 12 | 27 | 28 | −1 | 27 | |
| 13 | C.D. Beja | 30 | 8 | 11 | 11 | 29 | 40 | −11 | 27 | Relegation to Terceira Divisão |
| 14 | Odivelas F.C. | 30 | 6 | 11 | 13 | 26 | 41 | −15 | 23 | Relegation to Terceira Divisão |
| 15 | C. Oriental Lisboa | 30 | 7 | 8 | 15 | 30 | 45 | −15 | 22 | Relegation to Terceira Divisão |
| 16 | Silves F.C. | 30 | 5 | 8 | 17 | 24 | 49 | −25 | 18 | Relegation to Terceira Divisão |

== Play-offs ==
=== Championship play-off ===
| Pos | Team | Pld | W | D | L | GF | GA | GD | Pts | Promotion |
|---|---|---|---|---|---|---|---|---|---|---|
| 1 | U.D. Leiria (C) | 4 | 2 | 1 | 1 | 4 | 3 | +1 | 5 | Promotion to Primeira Divisão |
| 2 | G.D. Estoril Praia | 4 | 2 | 0 | 2 | 4 | 5 | −1 | 4 | Promotion to Primeira Divisão |
| 3 | Rio Ave F.C. | 4 | 1 | 1 | 2 | 4 | 4 | 0 | 3 | Promotion to Primeira Divisão |

(C) Champions

=== Promotion play-off ===
| Pos | Team | Pld | W | D | L | GF | GA | GD | Pts | Promotion |
|---|---|---|---|---|---|---|---|---|---|---|
| 1 | Académico de Viseu F.C. (P) | 6 | 4 | 1 | 1 | 12 | 4 | +8 | 9 | Promotion to Primeira Divisão |
| 2 | Leixões S.C. | 6 | 2 | 2 | 2 | 9 | 13 | −4 | 6 | |
| 3 | G.D. Nazarenos | 6 | 2 | 2 | 2 | 7 | 5 | +2 | 6 | |
| 4 | Juventude de Évora | 6 | 1 | 1 | 4 | 6 | 12 | −6 | 3 | |

(P) Promoted
