= 1976–77 Segunda Divisão =

43rd season of second-tier football league in Portugal

Segunda Divisão
- Season: 1976–77
- Champions: C.S. Marítimo
- Promoted: C.S. Marítimo; C.D. Feirense; G.D. Riopele

The 1976–77 Segunda Divisão season was the 43rd season of recognised second-tier football in Portugal.

== Overview ==
The league was contested by 48 teams in 3 divisions with C.S. Marítimo, C.D. Feirense and G.D. Riopele winning the respective divisional competitions and gaining promotion to the Primeira Liga. The overall championship was won by C.S. Marítimo.

== League standings ==
=== Segunda Divisão - Zona Norte ===
Pos	Team	Pld	W	D	L	GF	GA	GD	Pts	Qualification or relegation
1	G.D. Riopele	30	19	7	4	57	25	+32	45	Championship Play-off
2	S.C. Espinho	30	16	9	5	46	21	+25	41	Promotion Play-off
3	F.C. Paços de Ferreira	30	16	5	9	45	26	+19	37	
4	AD Fafe	30	13	9	8	38	34	+4	35	
5	C.F. União de Lamas	30	12	10	8	40	39	+1	34	
6	Gil Vicente F.C.	30	13	6	11	38	30	+8	32	
7	F.C. Famalicão	30	14	2	14	47	34	+13	30	
8	G.D. Chaves	30	12	6	12	34	32	+2	30	
9	S.C. da Régua	30	13	3	14	35	50	−15	29	
10	F.C. Penafiel	30	11	6	13	32	34	−2	28	
11	Lusitânia F.C.	30	10	8	12	25	30	−5	28	
12	SC Vila Real	30	10	8	12	30	37	−7	28	
13	U. S. C. Paredes	30	10	7	13	29	32	−3	27	Relegation to Terceira Divisão
14	S.C. Salgueiros	30	9	8	13	30	33	−3	26	Relegation to Terceira Divisão
15	F.C. Tirsense	30	5	7	18	24	56	−32	17	Relegation to Terceira Divisão
16	Vilanovense F.C.	30	4	5	21	18	55	−37	13	Relegation to Terceira Divisão

=== Segunda Divisão - Zona Centro ===
Pos	Team	Pld	W	D	L	GF	GA	GD	Pts	Qualification or relegation
1	C.D. Feirense	30	21	1	8	59	30	+29	43	Championship Play-off
2	S.C. Estrela	30	19	5	6	59	19	+40	43	Promotion Play-off
3	C.D. Portalegrense	30	16	7	7	34	20	+14	39	
4	S.C. Covilhã	30	14	8	8	43	35	+8	36	
5	União de Santarém	30	12	9	9	33	30	+3	33	
6	G.D. Peniche	30	11	10	9	28	19	+9	32	
7	A.D. Sanjoanense	30	9	13	8	27	21	+6	31	
8	A.C. Marinhense	30	11	9	10	29	29	0	31	
9	Académico de Viseu FC	30	12	4	14	34	42	−8	28	
10	U.F.C.I. Tomar	30	12	4	14	39	42	−3	28	
11	U.D. Leiria	30	10	8	12	26	31	−5	28	
12	C.F. União de Coimbra	30	11	5	14	24	37	−13	27	
13	Caldas Sport Clube	30	10	6	14	29	34	−5	26	Relegation to Terceira Divisão
14	S.C.U. Torreense	30	7	10	13	26	41	−15	24	Relegation to Terceira Divisão
15	C.D. Torres Novas	30	4	10	16	25	51	−26	18	Relegation to Terceira Divisão
16	SC Alba	30	4	5	21	22	56	−34	13	Relegation to Terceira Divisão

=== Segunda Divisão - Zona Sul ===
Pos	Team	Pld	W	D	L	GF	GA	GD	Pts	Qualification or relegation
1	C.S. Marítimo	30	18	7	5	47	18	+29	43	Championship Play-off
2	CUF Barreiro	30	17	8	5	47	17	+30	42	Promotion Play-off
3	Vasco da Gama A.C.	30	14	11	5	43	27	+16	39	
4	Juventude de Évora	30	14	10	6	46	23	+23	38	
5	F.C. Barreirense	30	15	6	9	34	26	+8	36	
6	Almada A.C.	30	11	12	7	29	24	+5	34	
7	S.C. Farense	30	13	5	12	34	29	+5	31	
8	Odivelas F.C.	30	9	12	9	35	31	+4	30	
9	Lusitano de Évora	30	8	12	10	31	33	−2	28	
10	G.D. Sesimbra	30	9	10	11	22	27	−5	28	
11	S.C. Olhanense	30	9	10	11	22	29	−7	28	
12	S.U. Sintrense	30	10	7	13	35	34	+1	27	
13	G.D. Alcochetense	30	7	11	12	23	40	−17	25	Relegation to Terceira Divisão
14	C.F. Esperança de Lagos	30	5	10	15	23	42	−19	20	Relegation to Terceira Divisão
15	G.U.S. Montemor	30	3	12	15	13	50	−37	18	Relegation to Terceira Divisão
16	Clube Oriental de Lisboa	30	2	9	19	14	48	−34	13	Relegation to Terceira Divisão

== Play-offs ==
=== Championship play-off ===
Pos	Team	Pld	W	D	L	GF	GA	GD	Pts	Promotion
1	C.S. Marítimo (C)	4	3	0	1	8	5	+3	6	Promotion to Primeira Divisão
2	C.D. Feirense	4	1	2	1	6	6	0	4	Promotion to Primeira Divisão
3	G.D. Riopele	4	0	2	2	3	6	−3	2	Promotion to Primeira Divisão

(C) Champions

=== Promotion play-off ===
Pos	Team	Pld	W	D	L	GF	GA	GD	Pts	Promotion
1	S.C. Espinho (P)	4	3	0	1	8	2	+6	6	Promotion to Primeira Divisão
2	S.C. Estrela	4	2	0	2	7	11	−4	4	
3	CUF Barreiro	4	1	0	3	6	8	−2	2	

(P) Promoted
