= 1982–83 Segunda Divisão =

49th season of second-tier football league in Portugal

Segunda Divisão
- Season: 1982–83
- Champions: Farense
- Promoted: F.C. Penafiel; R.D. Águeda
- Relegated: Lusitânia F.C.; Leça F.C.; U.D. Oliveirense; GD Bragança; Estrela Portalegre; Oliveira do Bairro; CD Estarreja; Nazarenos; Odivelas; Juventude Évora; Atlético C.P.; GD Quimigal

The 1982–83 Segunda Divisão season was the 49th season of recognised second-tier football in Portugal.

== Overview ==
The league was contested by 48 teams in 3 divisions with Farense, F.C. Penafiel and R.D. Águeda winning the respective divisional competitions and gaining promotion to the Primeira Liga. The overall championship was won by Farense.

The winners of each zone were promoted directly to the 1st division, while the runners-up played in a playoff called the competence tournament with the thirteenth-placed team in the 1st division, S.C. Espinho.

This was the first time in the history of Portuguese football that Belenenses played in the second division, having been relegated for the first time ever in the previous season from the 1st division.

The promotion play-off was also marked by protests from Lusitano de Évora players over unpaid wages, which resulted in the permanent removal of five starting players from the team.

== League standings ==
=== Segunda Divisão - Zona Norte ===
Pos	Team	Pld	W	D	L	GF	GA	GD	Pts	Qualification or relegation
1	F.C. Penafiel	30	18	7	5	51	28	+23	43	Championship Play-off
2	F.C. Vizela	30	16	6	8	48	28	+20	38	Promotion Play-off
3	F.C. Paços de Ferreira	30	15	7	8	57	24	+33	37	
4	G.D. Chaves	30	16	5	9	61	33	+28	37	
5	Leixões S.C.	30	15	7	8	45	25	+20	37	
6	A.D. Sanjoanense	30	12	10	8	30	22	+8	34	
7	Gil Vicente F.C.	30	10	11	9	25	33	−8	31	
8	F.C. Famalicão	30	10	11	9	36	32	+4	31	
9	C.D. Feirense	30	12	7	11	32	22	+10	31	
10	C.A. Valdevez	30	12	6	12	31	36	−5	30	
11	G.D. Riopele	30	8	13	9	36	32	+4	29	
12	U.D. Valonguense	30	10	9	11	37	48	−11	29	
13	Lusitânia F.C.	30	11	7	12	26	34	−8	29	Relegation to Terceira Divisão
14	Leça F.C.	30	5	7	18	29	65	−36	17	Relegation to Terceira Divisão
15	U.D. Oliveirense	30	4	8	18	25	59	−34	16	Relegation to Terceira Divisão
16	GD Bragança	30	3	5	22	17	65	−48	11	Relegation to Terceira Divisão

=== Segunda Divisão - Zona Centro ===
Pos	Team	Pld	W	D	L	GF	GA	GD	Pts	Qualification or relegation
1	R.D. Águeda	30	21	7	2	62	17	+45	49	Championship Play-off
2	Académica de Coimbra	30	21	6	3	74	32	+42	48	Promotion Play-off
3	U.D. Leiria	30	17	10	3	45	17	+28	44	
4	C.F. União de Coimbra	30	12	9	9	34	26	+8	33	
5	S.C. Beira-Mar	30	10	11	9	32	37	−5	31	
6	S.C.U. Torreense	30	9	10	11	32	36	−4	28	
7	U.D. Rio Maior	30	10	8	12	31	41	−10	28	
8	S.C. Covilhã	30	11	5	14	38	42	−4	27	
9	Anadia F.C.	30	10	7	13	42	46	−4	27	
10	Sport Benfica e Castelo Branco	30	8	11	11	34	40	−6	27	
11	G.D. Peniche	30	10	6	14	35	43	−8	26	
12	Académico de Viseu F.C.	30	10	6	14	29	39	−10	26	
13	Est. Portalegre	30	8	8	14	51	52	−1	24	Relegation to Terceira Divisão
14	Oliveira do Bairro S.C.	30	9	4	17	32	49	−17	22	Relegation to Terceira Divisão
15	C.D. Estarreja	30	7	7	16	29	45	−16	21	Relegation to Terceira Divisão
16	G.D. Nazarenos	30	6	7	17	27	65	−38	19	Relegation to Terceira Divisão

=== Segunda Divisão - Zona Sul ===
Pos	Team	Pld	W	D	L	GF	GA	GD	Pts	Qualification or relegation
1	S.C. Farense	30	21	7	2	75	19	+56	49	Championship Play-off
2	Lusitano de Évora	30	13	10	7	44	31	+13	36	Promotion Play-off
3	S.C. Olhanense	30	13	9	8	49	36	+13	35	
4	C.F. Os Belenenses	30	12	10	8	35	19	+16	34	
5	C.D. Nacional	30	12	9	9	43	29	+14	33	
6	C.F. União	30	10	11	9	37	32	+5	31	
7	S.G. Sacavenense	30	12	7	11	31	35	−4	31	
8	O Elvas C.A.D	30	9	12	9	30	33	−3	30	
9	C.D. Cova da Piedade	30	12	6	12	33	39	−6	30	
10	F.C. Barreirense	30	10	9	11	37	39	−2	29	
11	G.D. Sesimbra	30	10	8	12	28	45	−17	28	
12	Vasco da Gama A.C.	30	9	8	13	35	39	−4	26	
13	Odivelas F.C.	30	9	8	13	40	54	−14	26	Relegation to Terceira Divisão
14	Juventude de Évora	30	8	9	13	20	37	−17	25	Relegation to Terceira Divisão
15	Atlético C.P.	30	6	10	14	25	37	−12	22	Relegation to Terceira Divisão
16	G.D. Quimigal	30	4	7	19	16	54	−38	15	Relegation to Terceira Divisão

== Play-offs ==
=== Championship play-off ===
Pos	Team	Pld	W	D	L	GF	GA	GD	Pts	Promotion
1	Farense (C)	4	3	1	0	8	4	+4	7	Promotion to Primeira Divisão
2	F.C. Penafiel	4	1	1	2	5	6	−1	3	Promotion to Primeira Divisão
3	R.D. Águeda	4	1	1	2	4	8	−4	3	Promotion to Primeira Divisão

(C) Champions

=== Promotion play-off ===
Pos	Team	Pld	W	D	L	GF	GA	GD	Pts	Promotion
1	S.C. Espinho (P)	6	6	0	0	13	3	+10	12	Promotion to Primeira Divisão
2	F.C. Vizela	6	2	1	3	10	9	+1	5	
3	Lusit. Évora	6	2	1	3	8	14	−6	5	
4	Académica de Coimbra	6	0	2	4	4	9	−5	2	

(P) Promoted
