= 1951–52 Segunda Divisão =

Portuguese Second Division season

Segunda Divisão
- Season: 1951–52
- Champions: Lusit. Évora
- Promoted: Lusit. Évora; Vitória F.C.
- Relegated: None
- Matches: 397
- Goals: 1,614 (4.07 per match)
- Biggest home win: CUF 16–0 F. Benfica (28 October 1951)
- Biggest away win: Luso Morense 0–11 Lusit. Évora (16 September 1951)

The 1951–52 Segunda Divisão was the 18th season of Portuguese Second Division season, organized by the Portuguese Football Association. For the first time in history a team from Alentejo, Lusitano de Évora, were crowned champions of the Second Division. Qualification for this championship was achieved through district championships held between September and November 1951, which determined the top-ranked teams to participate in the 1951–52 Second Division.

Another team promoted was Vitória de Setúbal, which had been administratively relegated due to the scandal involving the enticement of players from Oriental. Vitória de Setúbal needed to beat Oriental, which had already secured a brilliant 5th place, in the last round of the 1950–51 1st Division. Vitória was accused of bribing three Oriental players and was relegated. Ironically, in the following season, in the playoff between teams from the 1st and 2nd divisions, there was a match between Oriental and Vitória. This time, Oriental lost legitimately and was relegated.

Qualification for the II Phase was preceded by a regional qualification stage, which was in fact the first phase, held in the 18 districts/Football Associations of Portugal (Madeira and Azores islands excluded). The best classified team in each regional championship would qualify for the II Division and the others would qualify for the III Division. There were no relegations, as qualification for the 2nd division was determined by the results of the regional championships of each football association.

== Table ==
=== Final Phase ===
Pos	Team	Pld	W	D	L	GF	GA	GD	Pts	Qualification or relegation
1	Lusit. Évora (C, P)	6	4	1	1	16	6	+10	9	Promotion to 1st Division
2	Vitória F.C. (Q)	6	3	1	2	8	8	0	7	Relegation Playoff
3	S.C.U. Torreense	6	2	1	3	8	8	0	5	
4	C.F. União de Coimbra	6	1	1	4	7	17	−10	3	

Updated to match(es) played on unknown. Source:
(C) Champions; (P) Promoted; (Q) Qualified for the phase indicated

=== Relegation Playoff ===
Vitória F.C. 1-0 Clube Oriental de Lisboa, 8 June 1952, Bairro das Covas, Torres Vedras. Vitória was promoted back to the First Division and Oriental were relegated to the Second Division for the 1952/53 season.

=== III Phase ===
==== North Group ====
Pos	Team	Pld	W	D	L	GF	GA	GD	Pts	Qualification or relegation
1	União de Coimbra (Q)	6	3	1	2	14	8	+6	7	Qualification to Final Phase
2	S.C.U. Torreense (Q)	6	3	1	2	9	9	0	7	Qualification to Final Phase
3	S.C. Vila Real	6	3	0	3	13	15	−2	6	
4	S.C. Espinho	6	2	0	4	10	14	−4	4	

Updated to match(es) played on unknown. Source:
(Q) Qualified for the phase indicated

==== South Group ====
Pos	Team	Pld	W	D	L	GF	GA	GD	Pts	Qualification or relegation
1	Vitória F.C. (Q)	6	4	1	1	20	10	+10	9	Qualification to Final Phase
2	Lusit. Évora (Q)	6	3	2	1	11	9	+2	8	Qualification to Final Phase
3	C.U.F.	6	2	3	1	12	12	0	7	
4	Grupo União Sport	6	0	0	6	5	17	−12	0	

Updated to match(es) played on unknown. Source:
(Q) Qualified for the phase indicated

=== II Phase ===
==== Zone B ====
Pos	Team	Pld	W	D	L	GF	GA	GD	Pts	Qualification or relegation
1	União de Coimbra (Q)	18	14	2	2	57	7	+50	30	Qualification to III Phase
2	S.C.U. Torreense (Q)	18	14	1	3	69	19	+50	29	Qualification to III Phase
3	Académico de Viseu F.C.	18	13	1	4	60	26	+34	27	
4	G.C. Alcobaça	18	8	3	7	40	44	−4	19	
5	Associação Naval 1º de Maio	18	8	3	7	22	23	−1	19	
6	G.D. Peniche	18	5	2	11	26	50	−24	12	
7	C.F. Os Marialvas	18	4	3	11	22	50	−28	11	
8	U.D. Guarda	18	3	5	10	18	45	−27	11	
9	Lusitano FCV	18	5	1	12	23	50	−27	11	
10	G.D. Covilhanense	18	3	5	10	10	33	−23	11	

Updated to match(es) played on unknown. Source:
(Q) Qualified for the phase indicated

==== Zone C ====
Pos	Team	Pld	W	D	L	GF	GA	GD	Pts	Qualification or relegation
1	Vitória F.C. (Q)	18	15	3	0	57	9	+48	33	Qualification to III Phase
2	C.U.F. (Q)	18	12	2	4	56	21	+35	26	Qualification to III Phase
3	Almada A.C.	18	9	4	5	45	27	+18	22	
4	C.D. Montijo	18	10	1	7	42	23	+19	21	
5	Casa Pia A.C.	18	6	6	6	28	28	0	18	
6	Leões de Santarém	18	9	0	9	36	37	−1	18	
7	Ferroviários Entroncamento	18	6	3	9	30	44	−14	15	
8	Operário de Lisboa	18	7	1	10	30	49	−19	15	
9	S.L. Olivais	18	3	1	14	28	64	−36	7	
10	C.F. Benfica	18	2	1	15	18	68	−50	5	

Updated to match(es) played on unknown. Source:
(Q) Qualified for the phase indicated

==== Zone D ====
Pos	Team	Pld	W	D	L	GF	GA	GD	Pts	Qualification or relegation
1	Grupo União Sport (Q)	18	15	0	3	63	17	+46	30	Qualification to III Phase
2	Lusit. Évora (Q)	18	12	4	2	66	26	+40	28	Qualification to III Phase
3	Juv. Évora	18	13	2	3	64	21	+43	28	
4	O Elvas C.A.D.	18	10	3	5	42	28	+14	23	
5	Olhanense	18	8	3	7	43	28	+15	19	
6	G.D. Portalegrense	18	6	2	10	38	48	−10	14	
7	Farense	18	6	1	11	24	44	−20	13	
8	Portimonense	18	4	4	10	33	43	−10	12	
9	C.D. Beja	18	3	3	12	25	72	−47	9	
10	São Domingos Mértola	18	1	2	15	13	84	−71	4	

Updated to match(es) played on unknown. Source:
(Q) Qualified for the phase indicated
