= 1956–57 Segunda Divisão =

Segunda Divisão
- Season: 1956–57
- Champions: Salgueiros
- Promoted: Salgueiros; Braga
- Relegated: União de Coimbra; Olivais

The 1956-57 Segunda Divisão is the 23rd season of Segunda Divisão.

== Table ==
=== Segunda Divisão - Zona Norte ===
Pos	Team	Pld	W	D	L	GF	GA	GD	Pts	Qualification or relegation
1	Salgueiros (P)	26	18	4	4	83	40	+43	40	Qualification to Championship play-off
2	Braga (P)	26	18	2	6	81	25	+56	38	Qualification to Championship play-off
3	Vitória de Guimarães (P)	26	15	7	4	67	34	+33	37	Qualification to Championship play-off
4	Gil Vicente	26	14	5	7	56	33	+23	33	
5	Leixões	26	14	3	9	67	50	+17	31	
6	Boavista	26	13	3	10	54	45	+9	29	
7	Vianense	26	11	3	12	54	55	−1	25	
8	Marinhense	26	8	7	11	59	60	−1	23	
9	Sanjoanense	26	10	3	13	48	61	−13	23	
10	Peniche	26	8	2	16	43	54	−11	18	
11	Espinho	26	5	8	13	41	67	−26	18	
12	Tirsense	26	7	3	16	43	66	−23	17	
13	União de Coimbra (R)	26	6	4	16	39	89	−50	16	Relegated to Terceira Divisão
14	Chaves	26	8	0	18	36	92	−56	16	

Updated to match(es) played on unknown. Source: ZeroZero
(P) Promoted; (R) Relegated

=== Segunda Divisão - Zona Sul ===
Pos	Team	Pld	W	D	L	GF	GA	GD	Pts	Qualification or relegation
1	Farense (P)	26	16	6	4	58	32	+26	38	Qualification to Championship play-off
2	Montijo (P)	26	14	6	6	58	40	+18	34	Qualification to Championship play-off
3	Coruchense (P)	26	12	7	7	46	26	+20	31	Qualification to Championship play-off
4	Olhanense	26	14	2	10	53	37	+16	30	
5	Beja	26	12	4	10	32	33	−1	28	
6	Arroios	26	10	6	10	48	52	−4	26	
7	Portimonense	26	9	5	12	56	59	−3	23	
8	Os Leões Santarém	26	9	5	12	42	46	−4	23	
9	Montemor	26	10	3	13	40	69	−29	23	
10	Almada	26	8	6	12	38	37	+1	22	
11	Juventude	26	9	4	13	27	37	−10	22	
12	Estoril Praia	26	10	2	14	39	51	−12	22	
13	Portalegrense	26	8	6	12	48	62	−14	22	
14	Olivais (R)	26	9	2	15	50	54	−4	20	Relegated to Terceira Divisão

Updated to match(es) played on unknown. Source: ZeroZero
(P) Promoted; (R) Relegated

== Playoffs ==
Pos	Team	Pld	W	D	L	GF	GA	GD	Pts	Qualification or relegation
1	Salgueiros (C, P)	10	6	2	2	30	18	+12	14	Promotion to Primeira Divisão
2	Braga (P)	10	7	0	3	26	13	+13	14	Promotion to Primeira Divisão
3	Vitória de Guimarães	10	6	2	2	28	15	+13	14	
4	Farense	10	2	2	6	16	27	−11	6	
5	Montijo	10	3	0	7	19	32	−13	6	
6	Coruchense	10	2	2	6	15	29	−14	6	

Updated to match(es) played on unknown. Source: ZeroZero
(C) Champions; (P) Promoted
