= 1966–67 Segunda Divisão =

33rd season of second-tier football league in Portugal

Segunda Divisão
- Season: 1966–67
- Champions: Barreirense
- Promoted: Tirsense
- Relegated: Oliveirense; Os Leões Santarém; Ovarense; Seixal

The 1966–67 Segunda Divisão season was the 33rd season of the competition and the 33rd season of recognized second-tier football in Portugal.

== League standings ==
=== Segunda Divisão - Zona Norte ===
Pos	Team	Pld	W	D	L	GF	GA	GD	Pts	Qualification or relegation
1	Tirsense (P)	26	18	2	6	66	29	+37	38	Qualification to Championship play-off
2	Salgueiros	26	13	5	8	51	40	+11	31	
3	União de Lamas	26	12	5	9	40	40	0	29	
4	Sporting da Covilhã	26	10	8	8	39	28	+11	28	
5	Académico de Viseu	26	13	2	11	32	36	−4	28	
6	Leça	26	11	5	10	29	34	−5	27	
7	Famalicão	26	8	9	9	34	43	−9	25	
8	Sporting de Espinho	26	10	5	11	37	40	−3	25	
9	União de Tomar	26	11	3	12	50	48	+2	25	
10	Peniche	26	9	5	12	32	34	−2	23	
11	Penafiel	26	11	1	14	32	45	−13	23	
12	Torres Novas	26	9	5	12	39	41	−2	23	
13	Oliveirense (R)	26	7	6	13	28	42	−14	20	Relegation to Terceira Divisão
14	Ovarense (R)	26	7	5	14	34	43	−9	19	Relegation to Terceira Divisão

(P) Promoted; (R) Relegated

=== Segunda Divisão - Zona Sul ===
Pos	Team	Pld	W	D	L	GF	GA	GD	Pts	Qualification or relegation
1	Barreirense (P)	26	15	6	5	55	24	+31	36	Qualification to Championship play-off
2	Portimonense	26	15	4	7	40	31	+9	34	
3	Cova da Piedade	26	10	10	6	36	23	+13	30	
4	Luso	26	10	8	8	28	26	+2	28	
5	Torreense	26	12	4	10	52	51	+1	28	
6	Alhandra	26	11	6	9	40	39	+1	28	
7	Olhanense	26	11	5	10	36	29	+7	27	
8	Sintrense	26	8	9	9	35	43	−8	25	
9	Almada	26	8	8	10	33	29	+4	24	
10	Montijo	26	8	7	11	33	44	−11	23	
11	Lusitano de Évora	26	9	4	13	46	49	−3	22	
12	Oriental	26	6	8	12	25	38	−13	20	
13	Seixal (R)	26	7	6	13	27	40	−13	20	Relegation to Terceira Divisão
14	Os Leões Santarém (R)	26	6	7	13	33	53	−20	19	Relegation to Terceira Divisão

(P) Promoted; (R) Relegated

== Championship play-off ==
Barreirense	3 – 1	Tirsense
