= 1967–68 Segunda Divisão =

34th season of second-tier football league in Portugal

Segunda Divisão
- Season: 1967–68
- Champions: Atlético CP
- Promoted: União de Tomar
- Relegated: Cova da Piedade; Olhanense; União de Lamas; Vizela

The 1967–68 Segunda Divisão season was the 34th season of the competition and the 34th season of recognized second-tier football in Portugal.

== League standings ==
=== Segunda Divisão - Zona Norte ===
Pos	Team	Pld	W	D	L	GF	GA	GD	Pts	Qualification or relegation
1	União de Tomar (P)	26	17	4	5	52	25	+27	38	Qualification to Championship play-off
2	Torres Novas	26	12	7	7	52	40	+12	31	
3	Salgueiros	26	11	7	8	32	23	+9	29	
4	Beira-Mar	26	11	6	9	42	32	+10	28	
5	Tramagal	26	8	11	7	32	30	+2	27	
6	Sporting de Espinho	26	10	6	10	34	35	−1	26	
7	Académico de Viseu	26	10	6	10	34	37	−3	26	
8	Penafiel	26	12	2	12	37	37	0	26	
9	Gouveia	26	10	5	11	38	45	−7	25	
10	Sporting da Covilhã	26	10	4	12	26	32	−6	24	
11	Famalicão	26	5	12	9	26	35	−9	22	
12	Leça	26	7	8	11	34	36	−2	22	
13	Vizela (R)	26	10	2	14	40	58	−18	22	Relegation to Terceira Divisão
14	União de Lamas (R)	26	6	6	14	39	43	−4	18	Relegation to Terceira Divisão

(P) Promoted; (R) Relegated

=== Segunda Divisão - Zona Sul ===
Pos	Team	Pld	W	D	L	GF	GA	GD	Pts	Qualification or relegation
1	Atlético CP (P)	26	16	4	6	53	28	+25	36	Qualification to Championship play-off
2	Peniche	26	13	8	5	41	24	+17	34	
3	Torreense	26	15	3	8	54	29	+25	33	
4	Alhandra	26	11	7	8	46	47	−1	29	
5	Sesimbra	26	9	9	8	29	26	+3	27	
6	Lusitano de Évora	26	11	3	12	29	33	−4	25	
7	Sintrense	26	9	7	10	31	42	−11	25	
8	Portimonense	26	8	9	9	34	32	+2	25	
9	Luso	26	8	8	10	25	30	−5	24	
10	Montijo	26	9	5	12	28	40	−12	23	
11	Almada	26	7	8	11	33	35	−2	22	
12	Oriental	26	5	12	9	18	32	−14	22	
13	Olhanense (R)	26	6	9	11	21	25	−4	21	Relegation to Terceira Divisão
14	Cova da Piedade (R)	26	5	8	13	28	47	−19	18	Relegation to Terceira Divisão

(P) Promoted; (R) Relegated

== Championship play-off ==
Atlético CP	3 – 2	União de Tomar
