= 2002–03 Segunda Divisão B =

Segunda Divisão
- Season: 2002–03
- Champions: Leixões SC
- Promoted: CD Feirense; Leixões SC; GD Estoril Praia
- Relegated: 12 teams

The 2002–03 Segunda Divisão season was the 69th season of the competition and the 56th season of recognised third-tier football in Portugal.

== Overview ==
The league was contested by 59 teams in 3 divisions with CD Feirense, Leixões SC and GD Estoril Praia winning the respective divisional competitions and gaining promotion to the Liga de Honra. The overall championship was won by Leixões SC.

== League standings ==
=== Segunda Divisão – Zona Norte ===
Pos	Team	Pld	W	D	L	GF	GA	GD	Pts	Promotion or relegation
1	Leixões SC	38	29	7	2	73	27	+46	94	Promotion to Liga de Honra
2	AD Lousada	38	21	9	8	73	41	+32	72	
3	FC Porto B	38	20	9	9	70	39	+31	69	
4	FC Vizela	38	18	10	10	52	34	+18	64	
5	União Paredes	38	15	12	11	48	37	+11	57	
6	SC Braga B	38	16	9	13	58	41	+17	57	
7	Caçadores das Taipas	38	16	7	15	51	53	−2	55	
8	Gondomar SC	38	16	7	15	53	56	−3	55	
9	Dragões Sandinenses	38	14	12	12	49	45	+4	54	
10	SC Espinho	38	14	11	13	60	54	+6	53	
11	AD Fafe	38	14	9	15	47	50	−3	51	
12	FC Pedras Rubras	38	12	13	13	55	63	−8	49	
13	Vilanovense FC	38	12	12	14	56	62	−6	48	
14	Infesta FC	38	11	11	16	53	59	−6	44	
15	SC Freamunde	38	10	12	16	52	70	−18	42	
16	Ermesinde SC	38	10	12	16	59	64	−5	42	
17	SC Vila Real	38	10	10	18	54	62	−8	40	Relegation to Terceira Divisão
18	Canelas	38	9	9	20	36	71	−35	36	Relegation to Terceira Divisão
19	AD Esposende	38	10	5	23	43	85	−42	35	Relegation to Terceira Divisão
20	SC Vianense	38	3	14	21	33	62	−29	23	Relegation to Terceira Divisão

=== Segunda Divisão – Zona Centro ===
Pos	Team	Pld	W	D	L	GF	GA	GD	Pts	Promotion or relegation
1	CD Feirense	36	25	6	5	56	32	+24	81	Promotion to Liga de Honra
2	Estrela Portalegre	36	22	10	4	63	28	+35	76	
3	Académico Viseu	36	19	8	9	52	29	+23	65	
4	UD Oliveirense	36	17	10	9	55	40	+15	61	
5	SCU Torreense	36	14	13	9	57	51	+6	55	
6	Oliveira do Bairro	36	15	7	14	52	53	−1	52	
7	SC Pombal	36	13	12	11	45	36	+9	51	
8	CD Fátima	36	14	9	13	62	56	+6	51	
9	AD Sanjoanense	36	13	12	11	49	41	+8	51	
10	Académica Coimbra B	36	12	12	12	49	54	−5	48	
11	Caldas SC	36	13	9	14	57	52	+5	48	
12	UD Vilafranquense	36	12	9	15	49	56	−7	45	
13	Oliveira do Hospital	36	12	6	18	53	60	−7	42	
14	SC Esmoriz	36	11	8	17	42	56	−14	41	
15	RD Águeda	36	10	8	18	37	52	−15	38	
16	AC Marinhense	36	9	8	19	48	68	−20	35	
17	Sertanense FC	36	9	8	19	44	73	−29	35	Relegation to Terceira Divisão
18	Benfica Castelo Branco	36	7	11	18	40	61	−21	32	Relegation to Terceira Divisão
19	SC São João de Ver	36	5	14	17	38	60	−22	29	Relegation to Terceira Divisão

=== Segunda Divisão – Zona Sul ===
Pos	Team	Pld	W	D	L	GF	GA	GD	Pts	Promotion or relegation
1	GD Estoril Praia	38	25	8	5	74	29	+45	83	Promotion to Liga de Honra
2	CD Mafra	38	18	11	9	55	41	+14	65	
3	Louletano DC	38	17	11	10	55	39	+16	62	
4	CD Olivais e Moscavide	38	16	12	10	53	50	+3	60	
5	FC Barreirense	38	16	12	10	53	45	+8	60	
6	Amora FC	38	17	9	12	48	39	+9	60	
7	Odivelas FC	38	16	11	11	50	45	+5	59	
8	AD Pontassolense	38	17	6	15	58	57	+1	57	
9	Marítimo Funchal B	38	16	8	14	54	48	+6	56	
10	SC Olhanense	38	14	13	11	60	50	+10	55	
11	AD Camacha	38	15	6	17	52	53	−1	51	
12	União Micaelense	38	12	14	12	49	46	+3	50	
13	SC Lusitânia	38	13	10	15	61	58	+3	49	
14	Oriental Lisboa	38	13	8	17	36	44	−8	47	
15	Sporting CP B	38	11	13	14	46	46	0	46	
16	Imortal DC	38	12	9	17	47	60	−13	45	Relegation to Terceira Divisão
17	Operário Açores	38	11	10	17	46	61	−15	43	Relegation to Terceira Divisão
18	Casa Pia AC	38	8	10	20	46	65	−19	34	Relegation to Terceira Divisão
19	Lusitano VRSA	38	8	7	23	33	80	−47	31	Relegation to Terceira Divisão
20	Seixal FC	38	7	8	23	34	54	−20	29	Relegation to Terceira Divisão
