= Pedro Estrela =

Portuguese footballer (born 1973)

Personal information
- Full name: Pedro Miguel Estrela Duarte
- Date of birth: 22 March 1973 (age 53)
- Height: 1.79 m (5 ft 10 in)
- Position: Midfielder

Youth career
- –1986: Marítimo Olhanense
- 1986: Sporting
- 1987–1989: Marítimo Olhanense
- 1989–1990: Olhanense

Senior career*
Years	Team	Apps	(Gls)
1990–1994	Olhanense		
1995–1997	Braga		
1997–1998	Leça		
1998–2000	Belenenses		
2000–2001	Portimonense		
2003	Atlético		
2003	Lusitano		
2003	Farense		
2004	O Elvas		
2005	Messinense		
- * Club domestic league appearances and goals

Pedro Miguel Estrela Duarte (born 22 March 1973) is a retired Portuguese football midfielder.
