= 1982–83 Primeira Divisão =

49th season of top-tier Portuguese football

Primeira Liga
- Season: 1982–83
- Champions: Benfica; 25th title
- Relegated: Marítimo; Amora; Alcobaça
- European Cup: Benfica (first round)
- Cup Winners' Cup: F.C. Porto (first round)
- UEFA Cup: Sporting CP (first round); Vitória de Guimarães (first round)
- Matches: 240
- Goals: 570 (2.38 per match)
- Top goalscorer: Fernando Gomes (36 goals)

The 1982–83 Primeira Divisão was the 49th season of top-tier football in Portugal.

== Overview ==
It was contested by 16 teams, and S.L. Benfica won the championship.

== League standings ==
Pos	Team	Pld	W	D	L	GF	GA	GD	Pts	Qualification or relegation
1	Benfica (C)	30	22	7	1	67	13	+54	51	Qualification to European Cup first round
2	Porto	30	20	7	3	73	18	+55	47	Qualification to Cup Winners' Cup first round (Note: Porto qualified for the Cup Winners' Cup as the other finalist, Benfica, had qualified for the European Cup.)
3	Sporting CP	30	18	6	6	48	25	+23	42	Qualification to UEFA Cup first round
4	Vitória de Guimarães	30	11	10	9	35	24	+11	32	Qualification to UEFA Cup first round
5	Boavista	30	12	6	12	32	38	−6	30	
6	Braga	30	13	3	14	41	43	−2	29	
7	Vitória de Setúbal	30	12	5	13	29	33	−4	29	
8	Rio Ave	30	13	3	14	43	45	−2	29	
9	Portimonense	30	11	7	12	35	31	+4	29	
10	Salgueiros	30	9	9	12	26	36	−10	27	
11	Estoril	30	9	8	13	26	39	−13	26	
12	Varzim	30	8	10	12	23	39	−16	26	
13	Espinho	30	9	7	14	23	37	−14	25	
14	Marítimo (R)	30	8	9	13	26	38	−12	25	Relegation to Segunda Divisão
15	Amora (R)	30	6	6	18	23	55	−32	18	Relegation to Segunda Divisão
16	Alcobaça (R)	30	4	7	19	20	56	−36	15	Relegation to Segunda Divisão

Source: RSSSF
(C) Champions; (R) Relegated

== Results ==
Home \ Away	ALC	AMO	BEN	BOA	BRA	ESP	EST	MAR	PTM	POR	RAV	SAL	SCP	VAR	VGU	VSE
Alcobaça		2–1	1–1	1–1	0–1	3–0	3–1	0–0	1–1	1–5	1–1	0–1	0–1	0–2	0–1	1–0
Amora	2–0		1–3	0–1	1–0	1–0	0–0	1–2	3–0	2–1	3–2	0–1	0–2	0–0	1–1	0–0
Benfica	8–1	4–2		3–0	6–0	4–0	3–0	2–0	4–1	3–1	0–0	1–0	1–0	8–0	1–0	1–1
Boavista	1–0	3–0	2–2		0–2	2–0	0–1	0–0	2–0	0–1	2–1	4–1	1–0	2–0	1–0	2–0
Braga	3–0	1–0	0–2	1–3		4–0	0–0	4–1	2–0	1–2	1–0	3–0	3–0	3–1	1–2	3–0
Espinho	0–0	1–1	0–1	0–0	4–1		2–1	3–1	0–1	0–2	0–2	1–1	1–0	1–0	0–0	2–1
Estoril	3–1	3–0	0–1	1–0	2–0	1–2		2–1	1–1	1–1	0–0	1–0	0–0	3–0	1–2	3–1
Marítimo	3–0	3–0	0–1	1–0	1–0	0–0	2–0		0–0	0–0	3–0	1–1	1–1	0–1	0–0	2–1
Portimonense	3–1	3–1	0–1	1–0	0–0	1–0	6–0	3–0		1–2	3–0	1–1	0–1	1–1	2–1	1–0
Porto	2–1	4–0	0–0	6–0	5–0	2–0	6–0	3–0	2–0		4–0	5–1	0–0	4–0	3–1	4–0
Rio Ave	4–1	1–0	0–1	5–0	3–1	3–2	1–0	6–1	2–1	0–3		3–1	0–1	2–1	2–1	1–0
Salgueiros	2–0	4–1	0–1	1–1	1–3	1–0	1–0	1–1	0–0	0–0	3–1		1–1	0–1	0–1	1–0
Sporting CP	4–1	4–1	1–0	4–2	6–2	1–0	3–0	1–0	1–0	3–3	4–2	3–0		2–0	1–0	1–0
Varzim	0–0	0–0	1–1	3–0	0–0	0–1	0–0	3–2	3–2	0–1	2–1	1–1	2–1		0–0	0–1
Vitória de Guimarães	1–0	7–1	0–0	1–1	1–0	1–2	1–1	2–0	0–2	0–0	2–0	0–1	4–1	1–1		3–0
Vitória de Setúbal	3–0	2–0	1–3	2–1	2–1	1–1	1–0	2–0	1–0	3–1	3–0	1–0	0–0	1–0	1–1	

Legend: Blue = home team win; Yellow = draw; Red = away team win.

== Season statistics ==
=== Top goalscorers ===
Rank	Player	Club	Goals
1	(Portugal) Fernando Gomes	Porto	36
2	(Portugal) Nené	Benfica	21
3	(Portugal) N'Habola	Rio Ave	20
4	(Portugal) Rui Jordão	Sporting	18
5	(Republic of Ireland) Mickey Walsh	Porto	15
6	(Socialist Federal Republic of Yugoslavia) Zoran Filipović	Benfica	14
7	(Portugal) António Oliveira	Sporting	11
8	(Portugal) Diamantino	Benfica	10
8	(Portugal) Raul Águas	Portimonense	10
10	(Portugal) Vítor Madeira	Estoril	9
10	(Portugal) Reinaldo	Boavista	9
10	(Portugal) António Sousa	Porto	9
