= Rogério Matias =

Portuguese footballer

Personal information
- Full name: Rogério Pedro Campinho Marques Matias
- Date of birth: 22 October 1974 (age 52)
- Place of birth: Vila Franca de Xira, Portugal
- Height: 1.80 m (5 ft 11 in)
- Position: Left-back

Team information
- Current team: Raja CA (sporting director)

Youth career
- 1985–1987: Alhandra
- 1987–1993: Benfica

Senior career*
Years	Team	Apps	(Gls)
1993–1994	Fafe	11	(1)
1994–1995	Amora	16	(1)
1995–1996	Académica	1	(0)
1996–1997	União Coimbra	11	(1)
1997–1998	Maia	30	(1)
1998–2000	Campomaiorense	57	(1)
2000–2006	Vitória Guimarães	152	(3)
2006–2007	Standard Liège	4	(0)
2008–2009	Rio Ave	19	(1)
Total		301	(9)

International career
1992–1993	Portugal U18	3	(0)
2003	Portugal B	1	(0)
2003–2005	Portugal	5	(0)
- * Club domestic league appearances and goals

Rogério Pedro Campinho Marques Matias (born 22 October 1974) is a Portuguese former professional footballer who played as a left-back. He is the current sporting director of Botola Pro club Raja CA.

== Club career ==
Matias was born in Vila Franca de Xira, Lisbon, and finished his formative years at S.L. Benfica. During his career, he represented AD Fafe, Amora FC, Académica de Coimbra, C.F. União de Coimbra, F.C. Maia, S.C. Campomaiorense, Vitória de Guimarães – his most steady period as he appeared in six consecutive Primeira Liga seasons, starting in five of those– Standard Liège and Rio Ave FC, retiring at age 34.

Over nine seasons in his country's top division, Matias made 221 appearances and scored five goals. He played 166 games for Vitória in all competitions.

== International career ==
Matias earned five caps for the Portugal national team under manager Luiz Felipe Scolari. He made his debut on 2 April 2003, as a substitute in a 1–0 friendly win over Macedonia held in Lausanne, Switzerland.

== Post-retirement ==
In May 2022, Matias replaced Diogo Boa Alma as Vitória's new director of football; his former teammate Flávio Meireles had occupied the role for the majority of the previous decade. In his four-year tenure, the club won the 2025–26 Taça da Liga, achieved a historic run in the 2024–25 UEFA Conference League and generated over €100 million in transfer revenues.

On 9 July 2026, in the same capacity, Matias was appointed at Botola Pro side Raja CA.
