= Segunda Divisão =

Former non-professional competition

- Founded: 1934
- Folded: 2013 (renamed Campeonato de Portugal)
- Country: Portugal
- Confederation: UEFA
- Number of clubs: 48
- Level on pyramid: 2 (1934–1990); 3 (1990–2013)
- Promotion to: Primeira Liga (1934–1990); Segunda Liga (1990–2013)
- Relegation to: Terceira Divisão
- Domestic cup: Taça de Portugal
- Last champions: Chaves (2012–13)
- Most championships: Barreirense (7 titles)
- Website: Official Website

The Segunda Divisão Portuguesa (English: Portuguese Second Division) was a football league situated at the third level of the Portuguese football league system. The division had previously been the second level of the Portuguese pyramid but, with the creation of the Liga Portugal 2 in 1990–91, it became the third level. The competition merged with the Terceira Divisão at the end of the 2012–13 to form a new enlarged third level league, the Campeonato Nacional de Seniores.

== Format ==
In its last season, the league was split into three zonal divisions: Norte (North), Centro (Centre) and Sul (South). Each division was made up of 16 teams. The winners of each division were promoted.

The three regional divisions were the usual format of the league, but definition of the tier championship varied: Sometimes it was an elimination tournament with a final, and other times a final round-robin of the regional division winners. Other times there would be no single champion, and all three regional winners would be promoted without playing a final. This last option was used once the Segunda Divisão was no longer the actual second tier.

== Seasons - League Tables ==
Decade										
1930s:					1934–35	1935–36	1936–37	1937–38	1938–39	1939–40
1940s:	1940–41	1941–42	1942–43	1943–44	1944–45	1945–46	1946–47	1947–48	1948–49	1949–50
1950s:	1950–51	1951–52	1952–53	1953–54	1954–55	1955–56	1956–57	1957–58	1958–59	1959–60
1960s:	1960–61	1961–62	1962–63	1963–64	1964–65	1965–66	1966–67	1967–68	1968–69	1969–70
1970s:	1970–71	1971–72	1972–73	1973–74	1974–75	1975–76	1976–77	1977–78	1978–79	1979–80
1980s:	1980–81	1981–82	1982–83	1983–84	1984–85	1985–86	1986–87	1987–88	1988–89	1989–90
1990s:	1990–91	1991–92	1992–93	1993–94	1994–95	1995–96	1996–97	1997–98	1998–99	1999–2000
2000s:	2000–01	2001–02	2002–03	2003–04	2004–05	2005–06	2006–07	2007–08	2008–09	2009–10
2010s:	2010–11	2011–12	2012–13							

== List of champions ==
=== Second-tier League: 1935–1990 ===
Season	Champions	Final score	Runners-up
Segunda Liga (Experimental)
1934–35	Carcavelinhos	1–1 aet, 2–1	Boavista
1935–36	Olhanense	2–1	Salgueiros
1936–37	Boavista	5–1	União de Lisboa
1937–38	Leixões	2–1	União de Lisboa
Segunda Divisão
1938–39	Carcavelinhos	1–0	Sporting da Covilhã
1939–40	Farense	3–2	Boavista
1940–41	Olhanense	4–1	Leça
1941–42	Estoril Praia	4–4, 3–1	Leixões
1942–43	Barreirense	6–1	Sanjoanense
1943–44	Estoril Praia	3–2	Vila Real
1944–45	Atlético CP	2–0	CUF Lisboa
Season	Champions	Runners-up	Third place
1945–46	Estoril Praia	Famalicão	União de Coimbra
1946–47	Braga	Lusitano VRSA	Oliveirense
1947–48	Sporting da Covilhã	Barreirense	CUF Barreiro
Season	Champions	Final score	Runners-up
1948–49	Académica de Coimbra	2–1	Portimonense
Season	Champions	Runners-up	Third place
1949–50	Boavista	Oriental	Académico de Viseu
1950–51	Barreirense	Salgueiros	União de Coimbra
1951–52	Lusitano de Évora	Vitória de Setúbal	Torreense
1952–53	Oriental	Torreense	CUF Barreiro
1953–54	CUF Barreiro	Torreense	Sporting de Espinho
1954–55	Torreense	Caldas	Oriental
1955–56	Oriental	Vitória de Guimarães	Boavista
1956–57	Salgueiros	Braga	Vitória de Guimarães
1957–58	Sporting da Covilhã	Vitória de Guimarães	Farense
Season	Champions	Final score	Runners-up
1958–59	Atlético CP	3–0	Leixões
1959–60	Barreirense	1–0	Salgueiros
1960–61	Beira-Mar	2–1	Olhanense
1961–62	Barreirense	2–0	Feirense
1962–63	Varzim	4–2	Seixal
1963–64	Braga	2–1	Torreense
1964–65	Beira-Mar	2–1	Barreirense
1965–66	Sanjoanense	0–0, 2–1	Atlético CP
1966–67	Barreirense	3–1	Tirsense
1967–68	Atlético CP	3–2	União de Tomar
1968–69	Barreirense	3–3, 2–1	Boavista
1969–70	Tirsense	2–0	Farense
1970–71	Beira-Mar	3–1	Atlético CP
1971–72	União de Coimbra	2–1	Montijo
1972–73	Académica de Coimbra	1–0	Olhanense
1973–74	União de Tomar	4–3	Sporting de Espinho
1974–75	Estoril Praia	1–0	Braga
1975–76	Varzim	3–1	Portimonense
Season	Champions	Runners-up	Third place
1976–77	Marítimo	Feirense	Riopele
1977–78	Famalicão	Barreirense	Beira-Mar
1978–79	Portimonense	Sporting de Espinho	União de Leiria
1979–80	Amora	Académica de Coimbra	Penafiel
1980–81	União de Leiria	Estoril Praia	Rio Ave
1981–82	Marítimo	Varzim	Alcobaça
1982–83	Farense	Águeda	Penafiel
1983–84	Belenenses	Vizela	Académica de Coimbra
1984–85	Desportivo das Aves	Sporting da Covilhã	Marítimo
1985–86	Rio Ave	Farense	O Elvas
1986–87	Sporting da Covilhã	Vitória de Setúbal	Sporting de Espinho
1987–88	Famalicão	Académico de Viseu	Estrela da Amadora
1988–89	União da Madeira	Tirsense	Feirense
1989–90	Salgueiros	Gil Vicente	Farense

=== Third-tier League: 1990–2013 ===
Season	Champions	Runners-up	Third place
Segunda Divisão B
1990–91	Ovarense	Rio Ave	Olhanense
1991–92	Campomaiorense	Felgueiras	Amora
1992–93	Leça	Portimonense	Académico de Viseu
1993–94	Amora	Feirense	União de Lamas
1994–95	Moreirense	Alverca	Académico de Viseu
1995–96	Varzim	Sporting da Covilhã	Beja
1996–97	Maia	Torreense	Nacional
1997–98	Santa Clara	Esposende	Naval 1º de Maio
Segunda Divisão B (3 Zone Champions)
1998–99
1998–99	North Zone		
1998–99	Freamunde	Leixões	Fafe
1998–99	Center Zone		
1998–99	Sporting da Covilhã	Sanjoanense	Lourinhanense
1998–99	South Zone		
1998–99	Imortal	Barreirense	Portimonense
1999–2000
1999–2000	North Zone		
1999–2000	Marco	Famalicão	Porto B
1999–2000	Center Zone		
1999–2000	Ovarense	Vilafranquense	Oliveira do Bairro
1999–2000	South Zone		
1999–2000	Nacional	Portimonense	União da Madeira
2000–01
2000–01	North Zone		
2000–01	Moreirense	Famalicão	Porto B
2000–01	Center Zone		
2000–01	Oliveirense	Sporting da Covilhã	Sanjoanense
2000–01	South Zone		
2000–01	Portimonense	União da Madeira	Barreirense
2001–02
2001–02	North Zone		
2001–02	Marco	Leixões	Porto B
2001–02	Center Zone		
2001–02	Sporting da Covilhã	Sporting Pombal	Torreense
2001–02	South Zone		
2001–02	União da Madeira	Sporting B	Camacha
2002–03
2002–03	North Zone		
2002–03	Leixões	Lousada	Porto B
2002–03	Center Zone		
2002–03	Feirense	Estrela de Portalegre	Académico de Viseu
2002–03	South Zone		
2002–03	Estoril Praia	Mafra	Louletano
2003–04
2003–04	North Zone		
2003–04	Gondomar	Dragões Sandinenses	Vizela
2003–04	Center Zone		
2003–04	Sporting de Espinho	Torreense	Sanjoanense
2003–04	South Zone		
2003–04	Olhanense	Barreirense	União Micaelense
2004–05
2004–05	North Zone		
2004–05	Vizela	Dragões Sandinenses	Infesta
2004–05	Center Zone		
2004–05	Sporting da Covilhã	Mafra	Académico de Viseu
2004–05	South Zone		
2004–05	Barreirense	Pinhalnovense	União da Madeira
Season	Champions	Final score	Runners-up
Segunda Divisão
2005–06	Olivais e Moscavide	1–0	Trofense
2006–07	Freamunde	1–0	Fátima
2007–08	Oliveirense	1–0	Sporting da Covilhã
2008–09	Fátima	2–1	Desportivo de Chaves
Season	Champions	Runner-up	Third place
2009–10	Arouca	Moreirense	União da Madeira
2010–11	União da Madeira	Atlético CP	Padroense
2011–12	Varzim	Tondela	Fátima
2012–13	Desportivo de Chaves	Farense	Académico de Viseu

=== Performances by club ===
Note: Years in italics indicate that the team was one of three declared Segunda Divisão champions.

Club	Champions	Runners-up	Winning years and Runners-up years
Barreirense	7	4	1943, 1948, 1951, 1960, 1962, 1965, 1967, 1969, 1978, 2004, 2005
Sporting da Covilhã	5	6	1939, 1948, 1958, 1985, 1987, 1996, 1999, 2001, 2002, 2005, 2008
Estoril Praia	5	1	1942, 1944, 1946, 1975, 1981, 2003
Varzim	4	1	1963, 1976, 1982, 1996, 2012
Atlético CP	3	3	1945, 1959, 1966, 1968, 1971, 2011
Olhanense	3	2	1936, 1941, 1961, 1973, 2004
União da Madeira	3	1	1989, 2001, 2002, 2011
Beira-Mar	3	0	1961, 1965, 1971
Portimonense	2	4	1949, 1976, 1979, 1993, 2000, 2001
Boavista	2	3	1935, 1937, 1940, 1950, 1969
Salgueiros	2	3	1936, 1951, 1957, 1960, 1990
Leixões	2	3	1938, 1942, 1959, 2002, 2003
Farense	2	3	1940, 1970, 1983, 1986, 2013
Braga	2	2	1947, 1957, 1964, 1975
Famalicão	2	2	1978, 1988, 2000, 2001
Oriental	2	1	1950, 1953, 1956
Académica de Coimbra	2	1	1949, 1973, 1980
Moreirense	2	1	1995, 2001, 2010
Carcavelinhos	2	0	1935, 1939
Marítimo	2	0	1977, 1982
Amora	2	0	1980, 1994
Ovarense	2	0	1991, 2000
Marco	2	0	2000, 2002
Freamunde	2	0	1999, 2007
Oliveirense	2	0	2001, 2008
Torreense	1	5	1953, 1954, 1955, 1964, 1997, 2004
Feirense	1	3	1962, 1977, 1994, 2003
Tirsense	1	2	1967, 1970, 1989
Sporting de Espinho	1	2	1974, 1979, 2004
Sanjoanense	1	1	1943, 1966
União de Tomar	1	1	1968, 1974
Rio Ave	1	1	1986, 1991
Leça	1	1	1941, 1993
Vizela	1	1	1984, 2005
Fátima	1	1	2007, 2009
Desportivo de Chaves	1	1	2009, 2013
Lusitano de Évora	1	0	1952
CUF Barreiro	1	0	1954
União de Coimbra	1	0	1972
União de Leiria	1	0	1981
Belenenses	1	0	1984
Desportivo das Aves	1	0	1985
Felgueiras	1	0	1992
Maia	1	0	1997
Santa Clara	1	0	1998
Nacional	1	0	2000
Gondomar	1	0	2004
Olivais e Moscavide	1	0	2006
Arouca	1	0	2010
União de Lisboa	0	2	1937, 1938
Vitória de Guimarães	0	2	1956, 1958
Vitória de Setúbal	0	2	1952, 1987
Mafra	0	2	2003, 2005
Dragões Sandinenses	0	2	2004, 2005
Vila Real	0	1	1944
CUF Lisboa	0	1	1945
Lusitano VRSA	0	1	1947
Seixal	0	1	1963
Montijo	0	1	1972
Águeda	0	1	1983
Académico de Viseu	0	1	1988
Gil Vicente	0	1	1990
Campomaiorense	0	1	1992
Alverca	0	1	1995
Esposende	0	1	1998
Vilafranquense	0	1	2000
Sporting de Pombal	0	1	2002
Sporting B	0	1	2002
Lousada	0	1	2003
Estrela de Portalegre	0	1	2003
Pinhalnovense	0	1	2005
Trofense	0	1	2006
Tondela	0	1	2012

Sporting positions
Preceded by –	Second tier of Portuguese football 1934–1990	Succeeded by Liga Portugal 2

Sporting positions
Preceded by Terceira Divisão	Third tier of Portuguese football 1990–2013	Succeeded by Campeonato de Portugal
