= 2003–04 Segunda Divisão B =

Segunda Divisão
- Season: 2003–04
- Champions: SC Espinho
- Promoted: SC Espinho; Gondomar SC; SC Olhanense
- Relegated: 12 teams

The 2003–04 Segunda Divisão season was the 70th season of the competition and the 57th season of recognised third-tier football in Portugal.

== Overview ==
The league was contested by 59 teams in 3 divisions with SC Espinho, Gondomar SC and SC Olhanense winning the respective divisional competitions and gaining promotion to the Liga de Honra. The overall championship was won by SC Espinho.

== League standings ==
=== Segunda Divisão – Zona Norte ===
Pos	Team	Pld	W	D	L	GF	GA	GD	Pts	Promotion or relegation
1	Gondomar SC	36	27	5	4	69	25	+44	86	Promotion to Liga de Honra
2	Dragões Sandinenses	36	27	4	5	84	30	+54	85	
3	FC Vizela	36	19	10	7	57	35	+22	67	
4	FC Porto B	36	16	10	10	56	33	+23	58	
5	CD Trofense	36	15	10	11	51	46	+5	55	
6	S.C. Braga B	36	15	7	14	49	48	+1	52	
7	Valdevez	36	13	12	11	41	42	−1	51	
8	Infesta FC	36	15	5	16	55	52	+3	50	
9	SC Freamunde	36	14	7	15	55	45	+10	49	
10	União Paredes	36	11	13	12	40	43	−3	46	
11	Lixa FC	36	12	9	15	56	52	+4	45	
12	AD Fafe	36	9	16	11	33	37	−4	43	
13	AD Lousada	36	11	10	15	46	64	−18	43	
14	FC Pedras Rubras	36	12	6	18	46	60	−14	42	
15	Vilanovense FC	36	11	6	19	41	52	−11	39	
16	GD Bragança	36	10	9	17	42	59	−17	39	
17	Caçadores das Taipas	36	10	9	17	50	53	−3	39	Relegation to Terceira Divisão
18	Ermesinde SC	36	11	5	20	39	56	−17	38	Relegation to Terceira Divisão
19	Leça FC	36	5	5	26	36	114	−78	20	Relegation to Terceira Divisão

=== Segunda Divisão – Zona Centro ===
Pos	Team	Pld	W	D	L	GF	GA	GD	Pts	Promotion or relegation
1	SC Espinho	38	25	6	7	70	36	+34	81	Promotion to Liga de Honra
2	SCU Torreense	38	22	11	5	54	22	+32	77	
3	AD Sanjoanense	38	18	9	11	52	40	+12	63	
4	Académico Viseu	38	17	10	11	53	47	+6	61	
5	SC Esmoriz	38	16	12	10	52	44	+8	60	
6	CD Fátima	38	16	9	13	55	57	−2	57	
7	UD Oliveirense	38	14	13	11	57	44	+13	55	
8	Caldas SC	38	16	7	15	53	57	−4	55	
9	União Lamas	38	14	9	15	51	46	+5	51	
10	UD Vilafranquense	38	15	6	17	51	48	+3	51	
11	CD Alcains	38	11	15	12	52	55	−3	48	
12	Oliveira do Bairro	38	11	15	12	45	48	−3	48	
13	FC Pampilhosa	38	11	11	16	58	58	0	44	
14	CD Estarreja	38	12	7	19	49	56	−7	43	
15	Oliveira do Hospital	38	10	13	15	41	60	−19	43	
16	Sporting Clube de Pombal	38	11	9	18	42	60	−18	42	
17	Académica Coimbra B	38	11	9	18	47	62	−15	42	Relegation to Terceira Divisão
18	RD Águeda	38	10	11	17	44	63	−19	41	Relegation to Terceira Divisão
19	AD Portomosense	38	7	18	13	50	54	−4	39	Relegation to Terceira Divisão
20	AC Marinhense	38	9	8	21	33	52	−19	35	Relegation to Terceira Divisão

=== Segunda Divisão – Zona Sul ===
Pos	Team	Pld	W	D	L	GF	GA	GD	Pts	Promotion or relegation
1	SC Olhanense	38	26	8	4	77	29	+48	86	Promotion to Liga de Honra
2	FC Barreirense	38	25	7	6	60	26	+34	82	
3	União Micaelense	38	18	12	8	41	28	+13	66	
4	CD Olivais e Moscavide	38	17	13	8	49	33	+16	64	
5	AD Camacha	38	17	10	11	55	46	+9	61	
6	Odivelas FC	38	18	7	13	51	48	+3	61	
7	Marítimo Funchal B	38	14	10	14	57	53	+4	52	
8	CD Mafra	38	14	9	15	51	51	0	51	
9	Louletano DC	38	12	14	12	43	39	+4	50	
10	SC Lusitânia	38	14	8	16	51	53	−2	50	
11	AD Pontassolense	38	11	17	10	58	53	+5	50	
12	Oriental Lisboa	38	12	12	14	45	48	−3	48	
13	CD Ribeira Brava	38	12	11	15	39	42	−3	47	
14	CD Pinhalnovense	38	12	10	16	41	47	−6	46	
15	Estrela Vendas Novas	38	12	8	18	40	51	−11	44	
16	Amora FC	38	12	8	18	46	61	−15	44	
17	SC Farense	38	11	8	19	40	57	−17	41	Relegation to Terceira Divisão
18	Sporting CP B	38	8	15	15	51	58	−7	39	Relegation to Terceira Divisão
19	SU Sintrense	38	7	12	19	41	62	−21	33	Relegation to Terceira Divisão
20	CD Santo António	38	5	7	26	35	86	−51	22	Relegation to Terceira Divisão
