= GD Bragança =

Portuguese association football club

Bragança
- Full name: Grupo Desportivo de Bragança
- Nicknames: Canarinhos (Little Canaries), Brigantinos
- Founded: 1943
- Ground: Estádio Municipal de Bragança; Bragança
- Capacity: 7,000
- Chairman: Manuel Martins
- Coach: André David
- League: Campeonato de Portugal
- 2015–16: Promotion Group North, 3rd
Home colours	Away colours

Grupo Desportivo de Bragança (abbreviated as GD Bragança) is a Portuguese football club based in Bragança in the district of Bragança.

== Background ==
GD Bragança currently plays in the Terceira Divisão Série A which is the fourth tier of Portuguese football. The club was founded in 1943 and they play their home matches at the Municipal de Bragança in Bragança. The stadium can accommodate 7,000 spectators.

The club is affiliated to Associação de Futebol de Bragança and has competed in the Taça Federação Portuguesa Futebol 3ª Divisão. The club has also entered the national cup competition known as Taça de Portugal (Cup of Portugal) on many occasions. They reached the quarter-finals of the 2006/07 Taça de Portugal before being knocked out by Os Belenenses.

== Season to season ==
Season	Level	Division	Section	Place	Movements
1990–91	Tier 3	Segunda Divisão	Série Norte	16th	Relegated
1991–92	Tier 4	Terceira Divisão	Série A	11th	
1992–93	Tier 4	Terceira Divisão	Série A	7th	
1993–94	Tier 4	Terceira Divisão	Série A	3rd	
1994–95	Tier 4	Terceira Divisão	Série A	13th	
1995–96	Tier 4	Terceira Divisão	Série A	12th	
1996–97	Tier 4	Terceira Divisão	Série A	5th	
1997–98	Tier 4	Terceira Divisão	Série A	3rd	
1998–99	Tier 4	Terceira Divisão	Série A	10th	
1999–2000	Tier 4	Terceira Divisão	Série A	1st	Promoted
2000–01	Tier 3	Segunda Divisão	Série Norte	15th	
2001–02	Tier 3	Segunda Divisão	Série Norte	18th	Relegated
2002–03	Tier 4	Terceira Divisão	Série A	1st	Promoted
2003–04	Tier 3	Segunda Divisão	Série Norte	17th	Relegated
2004–05	Tier 4	Terceira Divisão	Série A	6th	
2005–06	Tier 4	Terceira Divisão	Série A	2nd	Promoted
2006–07	Tier 3	Segunda Divisão	Série A	13th	Relegated
2007–08	Tier 4	Terceira Divisão	Série A – 1ª Fase	6th	Promotion Group
	Tier 4	Terceira Divisão	Série A Fase Final	6th	
2008–09	Tier 4	Terceira Divisão	Série A – 1ª Fase	2nd	Promotion Group
	Tier 4	Terceira Divisão	Série A Fase Final	3rd	
2009–10	Tier 4	Terceira Divisão	Série A – 1ª Fase	3rd	Promotion Group
	Tier 4	Terceira Divisão	Série A Fase Final	2nd	Promoted
2010–11	Tier 3	Segunda Divisão	Série Norte	15th	Relegated
2011–12	Tier 4	Terceira Divisão	Série A – 1ª Fase	4th	Promotion Group
	Tier 4	Terceira Divisão	Série A Fase Final	4th	

== League and cup history ==
Season	I	II	III	IV	V	Pts.	Pl.	W	L	T	GS	GA	Diff.
1969–70			14			20 pts	30	6	8	16	28	54	−26
...	...	...	...	...	...	...	...	...	...	...	...	...	...
1990–91				16									
1991–92				17									
1992–93				7									
1993–94				3									
1994–95				13									
1995–96				12		44 pts	34	11	11	12	45	43	+2
1996–97				...		...	...	...	...	...	...	...	...
1997–98				3		66 pts	34	19	9	6	57	39	+18
1998–99				10		49 pts	34	13	10	11	56	61	−5
1999–2000			18			32 pts	34	7	11	16	26	43	−17
2000–01			15										
2001–02			18										
2002–03				1									
2003–04			17			39 pts	36	10	9	17	42	59	−17
2004–05				6		48 pts	34	12	12	10	42	38	+4
2005–06				2		76 pts	34	22	10	2	65	22	+43
2006–07			13			25 pts	26	5	10	11	32	43	−9
2007–08				6		42 pts	26	11	9	6	31	25	+6
2008–09				2 [3		48 pts	26	15	3	8	28	22	+6
2009–10				3 [2]		...	...	...	...	...	...	...	...
2010–11			15										
2011–12				4 [4]									

== Honours ==
- Terceira Divisão: 1978/79, 1985/86, 1999/00, 2002/03
- Taça Federação Portuguesa Futebol 3ª Divisão: 1976/77

== Notable former managers ==
- (Portugal) António Amaral
- (Portugal) Eduardo Luís
