= A.C. Marinhense =

Portuguese association football club

Marinhense
- Full name: Atlético Clube Marinhense
- Founded: 1923
- Ground: Municipal da Marinha Grande; Marinha Grande
- Capacity: 5,200
- Chairman: Hélder Fernandes
- Manager: Hugh Kelliher
- League: Campeonato de Portugal
- 2021–22: 1st, Serie H Relegation Group
| Home colours | Away colours |

A.C. Marinhense is a football team in the Campeonato de Portugal based in Marinha Grande. In 2011–12, it finished 6th in promotion playoff, failing promotion to Portuguese Second Division.

== Appearances ==
- Tier 2/Liga de Honra: 29
- Terceira Divisão: 25
- Portuguese Cup: 56

== League and cup history ==
| Season | I | II | III | IV | V | Pts. | Pl. | W | L | T | GS | GA | Diff. |
|---|---|---|---|---|---|---|---|---|---|---|---|---|---|
| 2000–01 | | | 12 | | 39 pts | 36 | 18 | 6 | 12 | 61 | 43 | 18 | |
| 2001–02 | | | 15 | | | 19 pts | | | | | | | |
| 2002–03 | | | 16 | | | 19 pts | | | | | | | |
| 2003–04 | | | 20 | | | | | | | | | | |
| 2004–05 | | | | 3 | | | | | | | | | |
| 2005–06 | | | | 12 | | | | | | | | | |
| 2006–07 | | | | 5 | | | | | | | | | |
| 2007–08 | | | | 5 | | | | | | | | | |
| 2008–09 | | | | 2 | | 39 pts | 36 | 18 | 6 | 12 | 61 | 43 | 18 |
| 2009–10 | | | 13 | | | 34 pts | 30 | 9 | 7 | 14 | 20 | 37 | −17 |
| 2010–11 | | | | | | 31 pts | 32 | 13 | 7 | 12 | 39 | 31 | 8 |
| 2011–12 | | | | | | 19 pts | | | | | | | |

== Honours ==
- AF Leiria – First Division: (5)
  - 1929–30, 1934–35, 1936–37, 1937–38, 1942–43

== Squads ==
As of the 2011–12 season

Note: Flags indicate national team as defined under FIFA eligibility rules; some limited exceptions apply. Players may hold more than one non-FIFA nationality.

| No. | Pos. | Nation | Player |
|---|---|---|---|
| 13 | MF | POR | André Amaro |
| 70 | MF | POR | Rúben Coelho |

== Managers ==
- José Pestana
