= Ermesinde S.C. =

Ermesinde
- Full name: Ermesinde Sport Clube
- Founded: 1936
- Dissolved: 2013
- Ground: Ermesinde
- League: AF Porto Liga Honra
- 2013–13: 17th

Ermesinde Sport Clube was a Portuguese sports club from Ermesinde.

== History ==
The men's football team had two stints in the third-tier Segunda Divisão B; from 1991 to 1994 and 1998 to 2004. Later they were also relegated from the 2006–07 Terceira Divisão into the regional leagues.

In the AF Porto Liga Honra, Ermesinde finished 17th of 18. After that, the club went extinct. A phoenix club Ermesinde S.C. 1936 was founded in its place.
