= União Montemor =

Portuguese football club

- Full name: Grupo União Sport de Montemor
- Founded: 17 November 1914; 111 years ago
- Ground: Estádio 1º de Maio, Montemor-o-Novo
- Capacity: 2,000
- League: Campeonato de Portugal
- 2020–21: Elite AF Evora, 1st
- Website: https://grupouniaosport.footeo.com/
Home colours	Away colours

Grupo União Sport de Montemor is a Portuguese football club located in Montemor-o-Novo, Portugal.

== Colours and badge ==
União de Montemor's badge and colors are black and white.
