= G.D. Riopele =

Portuguese football club

- Full name: Grupo Desportivo Riopele
- Founded: 1958
- Dissolved: 1985
- Ground: Vila Nova de Famalicão, Braga
Home colours	Away colours

Grupo Desportivo Riopele (G.D. Riopele) was a Portuguese football club founded in 1958 from Vila Nova de Famalicão, Braga District. It was the works team of the Riopele textile factory. The club played once in the Primeira Liga in the 1977–78 season. The club's most notable former players include Jorge Jesus and José Romão. It was dissolved in 1985. After the dissolution of G.D. Riopele, the textile company Riopele has supported financially and sponsored G.D. Joane.

== Notable former players ==
- (Portugal) Jorge Jesus
