= Lusitano F.C. (Portugal) =

Portuguese association football club

- Full name: Lusitano Futebol Clube Vila Real de Santo António
- Founded: 1919; 107 years ago
- Ground: Estádio Municipal de Vila Real de Santo António
- Capacity: 2,896
- League: AF Algarve 1ª Divisão

Lusitano Futebol Clube, often known as Lusitano VRSA, is a Portuguese football club from Vila Real de Santo António, in the Algarve region. The club was founded on 15 April 1916 and is the No. 1 delegation of S.L. Benfica, and has Miguel Ângelo Machado Vairinhos as its current president. In the 2016–2017 season they competed in Campeonato de Portugal (third tier of Portuguese football pyramid) and their head coach is Ricardo Sousa. The team played in the main Portuguese football competition, the Portuguese Liga, for three seasons, in 1947–48, 1948–49 and 1949–50.

== Stadium ==
The stadium where the club plays is called Campo de Jogos Francisco Gomes Socorro and has the capacity for 2,500 spectators but in certain games such as matches in the Algarve Cup, they play at Complexo Desportivo Municipal de Vila Real de Santo António, with capacity for 2,896 spectators.

== Current squad ==
As of 30 August 2020

Note: Flags indicate national team as defined under FIFA eligibility rules; some limited exceptions apply. Players may hold more than one non-FIFA nationality.

No.	Pos.	Nation	Player
1	GK	POR	Ruca
3	DF	POR	Calico
9	FW	POR	Diogo Braz
10	FW	POR	Hélder Rodrigues
20	DF	BRA	Ricardo Leal
—	DF	POR	Leonardo Dias

No.	Pos.	Nation	Player
—	DF	POR	Rafael Silva
—	DF	POR	Gonçalo Lixa
—	MF	POR	Tiago Almeida
—	MF	GNB	Serifo Djaló
—	MF	CMR	Landry Nkolo
—	FW	POR	Luís Almeida

== Notable players ==
- (Portugal) José Maria Pedroto

== Equipment and sponsorship ==
Lusitano Futebol Clube are currently sponsored by CPA - Companhia de Pescarias do Algarve and their kit is made by Strike.

== Honours ==
First Division – 3 Appearances – Best Result: 12th Place

Algarve Regional League – 9 Titles (1922/23, 1927/28, 1928/29, 1929/30, 1931/32, 1934/35, 1954/55, 1977/78, 2011/12)
