= G.C. Alcobaça =

Portuguese association football club

Alcobaça
- Full name: Ginásio Clube de Alcobaça
- Founded: 1946
- Ground: Estádio Municipal; Alcobaça; Portugal
- Capacity: 5,000
- Chairman: (Portugal) José Mateus Ferreira
- Manager: (Portugal) Filipe Faria
- League: Leiria Football Association
- 2015–16: Leiria Division of Honor, 1st (promoted)
Home colours	Away colours

Ginásio Clube Alcobaça is a Portuguese sports club from Alcobaça.

The club was founded in 1946. In the 2018–19 season, the senior football section plays in the tier 1 of the Leiria Football Association.

== Appearances ==
- Primeira Divisão: 1
- Segunda Divisão: 14
- Terceira Divisão: 34

== League history ==
The club has a single presence at the top level of Portuguese football, during the 1982–83 season.

Season		Pos.	Pl.	W	D	L	GS	GA	P	Notes
1982–1983	1D	16	30	4	7	19	20	56	15	relegated
2008–09	AF Leiria – Divisão de Honra	2	30	20	4	6	57	25	64	
2009–10	AF Leiria – Divisão de Honra	3	30	17	8	5	59	24	59	
2010–11	AF Leiria – Divisão de Honra	1	30	22	5	3	68	19	71	Promoted
2011–12	Série D	9	28	9	8	11	38	29	26	

== Honours ==
- AF Leiria First Division

- 1946-47, 1950–51, 1953–54, 1955–56, 1957–58, 1958–59, 1971–72, 1992–93, 1995–96, 2000–01, 2010–11

- AF Leiria Cup

- 2004-05

== Greatest Performances ==
- Primeira Liga: 16th (1982–83 season)
- Portuguese Cup: 1/2 (1981–82 season)

== Current squad ==
As of 12 April 2017

Note: Flags indicate national team as defined under FIFA eligibility rules; some limited exceptions apply. Players may hold more than one non-FIFA nationality.

No.	Pos.	Nation	Player
1	GK	POR	João Pedro
2	DF	POR	Diogo Santana
3	DF	POR	Ricardo Soares
4	DF	POR	André Oliveira
5	DF	POR	Miguel Jacinto
6	DF	POR	Paulo Brites
7	MF	POR	Tiago Figueiredo
8	MF	POR	Vasco Pontes
8	MF	POR	Bruno Daniel
9	FW	POR	Ricky Duarte
10	MF	POR	Miguel Pinheiro
11	MF	POR	Rui Rodrigues
12	GK	POR	Danilo Mota
13	MF	POR	Telmo Pereira

No.	Pos.	Nation	Player
14	MF	POR	João Pimentel
15	DF	POR	Carlos Marques
16	MF	POR	Ricardo Pontes
17	FW	POR	Vasco Gonçalves
18	MF	POR	Luís Vitorino
19	MF	POR	Fábio Rosado
20	MF	POR	João Candeias
21	MF	POR	Dinis Quitério
23	DF	POR	Sérgio Neves
34	DF	POR	Luís Silva
—	DF	POR	Francisco Graça
—	DF	GER	Bienvenue Basala-Mazana
—	MF	POR	Duarte Martins
—	FW	POR	Rafael Portela
