= C.F. União de Lamas =

Portuguese football club

CF União de Lamas
- Full name: Clube de Futebol União de Lamas
- Founded: 1932
- Ground: Comendador Henrique Amorim; Santa Maria de Lamas; Portugal
- Capacity: 9,000
- Chairman: José das Neves Alves (as of 2013)
- Head Coach: Jorge lima (as of 2013)
- League: AF Aveiro Campeonato Sabseg
- 2021-22: AF Aveiro Campeonato Sabseg Zona Norte, 2nd (did not achieve promotion in the next phase of the competition by finishing in 3rd place).
Home colours	Away colours

Clube de Futebol União de Lamas (abbreviated as CF União de Lamas) is a Portuguese football club based in Santa Maria de Lamas, Santa Maria da Feira.

== Background ==
CF União de Lamas currently plays in the AF Aveiro Campeonato Sabseg. The club was founded in 1932 and they play their home matches at the Comendador Henrique Amorim in Santa Maria de Lamas.

União de Lamas has won three Terceira Divisão titles and two Aveiro District titles. The club's most successful spell came in the mid-1990s, from 1995 to 2003, when they played in the Liga de Honra, Portugal's second-tier league. Their best classification overall was a 4th place in the Second Division North Zone in 1980, which at that time was the second-tier league in Portugal. Since the 2009–10 season the club has been competing in I Divisao of the AF Aveiro regional league.

The club is affiliated to Associação de Futebol de Aveiro and has competed in the AF Aveiro Cup. The club has also entered the national cup competition known as Taça de Portugal on many occasions.

== Appearances ==
- Tier 2: 9

== Season to season ==
Season	Level	Division	Section	Place	Movements
1980–81	Tier 2	Segunda Divisão		4th	
1990–91	Tier 3	Segunda Divisão	Serie Norte	8th	
1991–92	Tier 3	Segunda Divisão	Serie Centro	7th	
1992–93	Tier 3	Segunda Divisão	Serie Centro	3rd	
1993–94	Tier 3	Segunda Divisão	Serie Norte	1st	Promoted
1994–95	Tier 2	Liga de Honra		6th	
1995–96	Tier 2	Liga de Honra		14th	
1996–97	Tier 2	Liga de Honra		6th	
1997–98	Tier 2	Liga de Honra		14th	
1998–99	Tier 2	Liga de Honra		15th	
1999–2000	Tier 2	Liga de Honra		8th	
2000–01	Tier 2	Liga de Honra		10th	
2001–02	Tier 2	Liga de Honra		13th	
2002–03	Tier 2	Liga de Honra		18th	Relegated
2003–04	Tier 3	Segunda Divisão	Serie Centro	9th	
2004–05	Tier 3	Segunda Divisão	Serie Norte	17th	Relegated
2005–06	Tier 4	Terceira Divisão	Série C	1st	Promoted
2006–07	Tier 3	Segunda Divisão	Serie B	14th	Relegated
2007–08	Tier 4	Terceira Divisão	Série C – 1ª Fase	8th	Relegation Group
	Tier 4	Terceira Divisão	Sub-Série C2	2nd	
2008–09	Tier 4	Terceira Divisão	Série C – 1ª Fase	8th	Relegation Group
	Tier 4	Terceira Divisão	Sub-Série C2	3rd	Relegated
2009–10	Tier 5	Distritais	AF Aveiro – 1ª Divisão	5th	
2010–11	Tier 5	Distritais	AF Aveiro – 1ª Divisão	8th	
2011–12	Tier 5	Distritais	AF Aveiro – 1ª Divisão	2nd	

== Honours ==
- Terceira Divisão: 3
  - 1963–64, 1968–69, 2005–06
- AF Aveiro Championship: 2
  - 1941–42, 1942–43
- AF Aveiro First Division: 2
  - 1953–54, 1962–63

== Notable players ==
- (Portugal) Beto

== Notable former managers ==
- (Spain) Paco Fortes
