= S.C. Salgueiros =

Portuguese association football club

Salgueiros
- Full name: Sport Comércio e Salgueiros
- Short name: Salgueiros
- Founded: 8 December 1911 as Sport Grupo e Salgueiros
- Ground: Complexo Desportivo de Campanhã; Porto, Portugal
- Capacity: 1,000
- Chairman: Gil Soares Almeida
- Manager: Domingos Barros
- League: Campeonato de Portugal
- 2023–24: 7th, Serie B
- Website: scsalgueiros.com
Home colours	Away colours

Sport Comércio e Salgueiros (Portuguese pronunciation: [sɨˈpɔɾ kuˈmɛɾsi.u i salˈɣɐjɾuʃ]), commonly known as simply Salgueiros, is a Portuguese multi-sports club from the city of Porto, in the northern region of the country. Its most well-known department is its football department but the multi-sports club has also departments for other sports, such as American football, athletics, baseball, and esports.

Founded on 8 December 1911, in the parish of Paranhos, its main men's football team plays in the Campeonato de Portugal, which is the fourth tier of Portuguese football. Although they are based in Paranhos, they currently play their home matches at the neighboring parish of Campanhã's Complexo Desportivo de Campanhã which can accommodate 1,000 spectators.

The football department has a B reserve team, called S.C. Salgueiros B, which plays in lower leagues.

== History ==
=== Foundation ===
In 1911, a group of friends (João da Silva Almeida, Aníbal Jacinto and Antenor) decided to fund a football club after watching a game that opposed FC Porto and S.L. Benfica at the Campo da Rainha. The friends would gather after work and dinner at lamp 1047 between the streets of Constituição and Particular de Salgueiros to debate ideas and build their new club. Thus was formed Sport Grupo e Salgueiros.

The club had no money at the time, so the three founders decided to gather money by singing Christmas songs from door to door during the 1911 Christmas season. They collected a total of 2800 reis, which was enough to purchase their first football. They decided their jerseys should be red like Benfica's as a way to separate themselves from city rivals FC Porto. Their first pitch would be at the Arca D'Água, and the team's first matches were against Sport Progresso, Carvalhido Football Club, and others.

In the 1916–17 season, the team name was changed to Sport Porto e Salgueiros as a matter of local pride (and maybe also for its similarity with Sport Lisboa e Benfica). However, in 1920, after a profound economical crisis, Sport Porto e Salgueiros decided to join forces with another local club named Sport Comércio. This resulted in the name change of Sport Comércio e Salgueiros.

=== Golden years ===
From the 1930s, when the national leagues commenced, to the 1970s, Sport Comércio e Salgueiros was a mainstay of the Second Division, with the occasional participation in the First Division. That trend changed in the beginning of the 80's, with team being able to maintain respectable placings and playing for several consecutive years in the top tier. The highlight was a 5th place in the 1990–91 season that enabled the club to participate in European competitions for the first (and so far only) time. In the 1991–92 UEFA Cup, Salgueiros played Cannes in the first round and lost on penalties. Among the players in the French team was Zinedine Zidane. Salgueiros last participation in the first division was in the 2001–02 season.

=== Decline and resurgence ===
In 2004–05, facing perhaps its biggest economical crisis since its foundation, the senior football team was administratively relegated from the second division to the third-tier league. Due to the financial crisis, all the players in that season were non-professional, mostly promoted players from the youth teams. The club had also recently lost its emblematic stadium, (Estádio Engenheiro Vidal Pinheiro), which had been sold to the city hall in order to build a subway station at its location, and had no home arena in which to play their matches or to practice. Due to the dramatic financial situation and debts, with the club prevented from registering professional players, the senior team ceased to exist at end of the season.

=== Phoenix club ===
After three years dormant, a Salgueiros team made its comeback to senior football as a new club named Sport Clube Salgueiros 08 for the 2008–09 season. However, the youth teams remained using the Sport Comércio e Salgueiros name. Starting with a senior football team, the new club soon expanded to futsal and handball teams, also creating female sections for football and handball. In their first season in the district leagues in 2008–09, the football team averaged home attendances of over 2,200 people per game, the 15th highest average attendance nationally, proving that support for the charismatic club was as strong as ever. They started in the Porto FA Second Division (the 7th tier of Portuguese football). Three more promotions in four seasons led Salgueiros from the regional leagues to the Campeonato Nacional de Seniores (now Campeonato de Portugal).

Eventually, they changed the name Sport Club Salgueiros for the 2015–16. On 8 December 2015, the club announced it had regained the rights of the original Sport Comércio e Salgueiros and would return to its former name and symbols at the start of the 2016–17 season.

== Crest ==
1920–Present
as Sport Comércio e Salgueiros

== Honours ==
=== National competitions ===
- Segunda Divisão
  - Winners: 1956–57, 1989–90

=== Regional competitions ===
- Porto FA Championship/First Division
  - Winners: 1917–18, 1949–50
- Porto FA Second Division
  - Winners: 1921–22
- Porto FA Cup
  - Winners: 1976–77, 1979–80

== European competitions history ==
Season	Competition	Round	Opponent	Home	Away	Aggregate
1991–92	UEFA Cup	1R	(France) Cannes	1–0	0–1	1–1 (2–4 p)

== Recent seasons ==
Season	Level	Division	Section	Place	Movements
2016–17	Tier 3	Campeonato de Portugal	Serie C – 1st Phase	2nd	
2016–17	Tier 3	Campeonato de Portugal	North Zone – Promotion	3rd	
2017–18	Tier 3	Campeonato de Portugal	Serie B – 1st Phase	12th	Relegated
2018–19	Tier 4	Regional	AF Porto – Elite Division	5th	
2019–20	Tier 4	Regional	AF Porto – Elite Division	1st	Promoted
2020–21	Tier 3	Campeonato de Portugal	Serie C - 1st Phase	6th	
2021–22	Tier 4	Campeonato de Portugal	Serie C - 1st Phase	1st	
2021–22	Tier 4	Campeonato de Portugal	North Zone - Promotion	4th	
2022–23	Tier 4	Campeonato de Portugal	Serie B - 1st Phase	1st	
2022–23	Tier 4	Campeonato de Portugal	North Zone - Promotion	4th	
2023–24	Tier 4	Campeonato de Portugal	Serie B - 1st Phase	7th	

== Current squad ==
As of 29 May 2025

Note: Flags indicate national team as defined under FIFA eligibility rules; some limited exceptions apply. Players may hold more than one non-FIFA nationality.

No.	Pos.	Nation	Player
2	DF	POR	Luís Simão
7	FW	GHA	Baba Zakari
8	MF	CMR	Landry Nkolo
10	MF	POR	Diogo Rosado
13	DF	BRA	Daniel Ghiggino
16	FW	ARG	Joaquín Ponce
17	MF	POR	Afonso Couto
20	MF	POR	Miguel Ângelo
22	FW	PER	Zapata

No.	Pos.	Nation	Player
23	FW	POR	Diogo Valente (captain)
25	DF	CPV	Pecks
28	FW	POR	Pedro Prazeres
31	GK	POR	Gonçalo Ferreira
52	DF	BRA	Café
70	MF	POR	João Tentugal
77	GK	POR	José Chastre
90	FW	POR	Pedro Soares
99	FW	POR	Miguel Santos

== Other sports ==
Known mostly for its football section, the club has excelled at several other sports, such as water polo, handball and athletics. Despite the fact that Salgueiros doesn't have a swimming pool, the water polo team, coached by Nuno Mariani, won its 12th national title in a row in 2006. After being runner-up in the 2007 championship Salgueiros renewed the national title in 2008.

== Notable players ==
_{Played more than 50 league games, or gained national notability elsewhere}

- (Portugal) (Brazil) Deco
- (Portugal) Ricardo Sá Pinto
- (Hungary) Miklós Fehér
- (Brazil) Marcelo Moretto
- (Portugal) José Moreira
- (Portugal) Pedro Espinha
- (Portugal) Marco Caneira
- (Portugal) Jorge Madureira
- (Portugal) Rui França
- (Portugal) Ricardo Nascimento
- (Portugal) (Cape Verde) Nélson
- (Brazil) Edmilson
- (Angola) João Ricardo
- (Romania) Basarab Panduru
- (Bulgaria) Ilian Iliev
- (Portugal) Silvino
- (Portugal) José Fonte
- (Portugal) Fábio
- (Portugal) Madureira II
- (Portugal) Pedro Reis
- (Portugal) Chico Fonseca
- (Portugal) Basílio Almeida
- (Republic of Ireland) Mickey Walsh
- (Serbia) Ivan Litera
- (Portugal) Germano
- (Portugal) Alberto Augusto
- (Portugal) João Pedro
- (Portugal) Abílio
- (Libya) Djamal Mahamat
- (Portugal) Nandinho
