= C.F. União de Coimbra =

Portuguese sports club

União de Coimbra
- Full name: Clube de Futebol União de Coimbra
- Founded: 2 June 1919
- Ground: Campo da Arregaça, Coimbra
- Capacity: 1,500
- Chairman: Fernando Soares
- Manager: Tiago Felgar
- League: Campeonato de Portugal; Taça de Portugal
Home colours	Away colours

Clube União 1919, usually known as União de Coimbra (Portuguese pronunciation: [uniˈɐ̃w dɨ kuˈĩbɾɐ]), is a sports club in the city of Coimbra, Portugal. The club was founded on 2 June 1919 and has a large array of currently active or temporarily disbanded sports departments which includes football, futsal, basketball, aikido, volleyball, swimming, esports and billiards. The main men's football team currently plays in the Campeonato de Portugal. The club uses a stadium in Coimbra, the Campo da Arregaça, which has 1,500 seats and belongs to the municipality.

== History ==
The club was founded on 2 June 2, 1919 in Coimbra, Portugal, under the name União Foot-Ball Coimbra Club. Its founders were a group of young people linked to commerce and industry, including shop and workshop owners and employees, bricklayers, locksmiths, tinsmiths, shoemakers, etc., who set up their own "foot-ball" club in the heart of the city's downtown. The first talks took place in the shop of shoemaker Afonso Chato, in Largo do Romal, in October 1918. Subsequent meetings were held in Largo de Sansão, now Praça 8 de Maio, in the heart of downtown Coimbra. Later, the board of directors decided to change the name to Clube de Futebol União de Coimbra (CF União de Coimbra).

The club's traditional stadium in Coimbra city proper, the Campo da Arregaça, was inaugurated in 1928 and built by the Coimbra City Hall, but in the 21st century the club has also played for some periods of time in the Estádio Municipal Sérgio Conceição, another City Hall-owned 2,500-seat stadium in Taveiro, a civil parish of Coimbra Municipality located in the outskirts of the city proper, which is a municipal stadium built in 2002 and was named after Coimbra-born football player Sérgio Conceição.

The main football team of União de Coimbra played one single season in the Portuguese First Division, in the 1972-1973 season, among big clubs like FC Porto, Benfica and Sporting Clube de Portugal. However this season coincided with hometown big club Académica de Coimbra being in Segunda Divisão as a result of being relegated the previous season, so a top division Coimbra derby never took place.

In 2016, for legal reasons related to the club's financial distress and subsequent reorganization after its bankruptcy, the club was forced to change its name to Clube União 1919.

== Facilities ==
The sports club owns an indoor arena, the Pavilhão do Clube de Futebol União de Coimbra (Clube de Futebol União de Coimbra's Pavilion). The club is headquartered in this building in Santo António dos Olivais, located nearby the Coimbra City Stadium.

It uses City Hall-owned Campo da Arregaça, with 1,500 seats, and Estádio Municipal Sérgio Conceição, with 2,500 seats, for football matches. Historically, the Campo da Arregaça is considered the club's traditional stadium and it is operated by the club as its main training ground.

== Support ==
The official organized supporters group (claque in Portuguese) is called "Rambos da Arregaça" (Arregaça's Rambos) and is named after fictional character Rambo. One of its mottos is "Vai Tudo" (everybody/everything/it all goes).

== Rivalries ==
Historically, the Académica de Coimbra football team was considered an elitist club because it was made up of and supported by students from the University of Coimbra during a time when only the wealthiest people used to gain admission into the university, while those who had never attended the local university or any other, colloquially known as futricas, a derogatory term, played for and supported União de Coimbra. This has led to the emergence of a historic rivalry between the two clubs since the beginning of the city's football history.

== Football: league history ==
The club has a single presence at the top level of Portuguese football.

Season		Pos.	Pl.	W	D	L	GS	GA	P	Notes
1972–1973	1D	14	30	5	7	18	22	54	17	relegated
1992–93	3	1	34	21	13	0	62	15	55	Promoted

== In popular culture ==
Bruno Aleixo, a fictional character, popular in Portugal and Brazil, created by the comedy group GANA is a supporter of União de Coimbra.

== Honours ==
- Campeão Nacional 2ªDiv.: 1
- Campeão Nacional 3ªDiv.: 1
- Campeão Distrital da Associação de Futebol de Coimbra: 1
- Winner of the Taça da Associação de Futebol de Coimbra: 1

== Notable sportspeople ==
=== Football ===
- António José Seabra (1945–2024), team captain over the course of several years who played for the team when it reached top flight football in Portugal at the end of the 1971–72 season, and who was also a medical doctor
- Joaquim Melo (born 1949), former football goalkeeper with 368 club caps in his career who was both a youth and a senior player for the club
- Rogério Matias (born 1974), played for the team in the 1996–97 season and would later earn five caps for Portugal

=== Swimming ===
- Diogo Ribeiro (born 2004), world champion who as a youth was a swimmer for the club
