= C.D. Montijo =

Portuguese football club

Montijo
- Nickname: Aldeanos (People from Montijo)
- Founded: 1948
- Dissolved: 2007
- Ground: Campo da Liberdade, Montijo
- Capacity: 1,000
- Website: http://www.cdmontijo.com/

Clube Desportivo de Montijo commonly known as simply as Montijo was a football club from the city of Montijo, Setúbal. The club was founded in 1948 and folded in 2007 due to financial problems. As Clube Desportivo de Montijo, it played in the Primeira Liga on three occasions in the 1972–73, 1973–74, 1976–77 seasons. Former Portuguese international goalkeeper Ricardo played for the club between 1994 and 1995 before being transferred to Boavista.

After it folded in 2007 it restarted as Clube Olímpico do Montijo on the 11 July 2007. The current Montijo team plays at the Campo da Liberdade which holds a seating capacity of 1,000. As Clube Olímpico do Montijo it currently plays in the Campeonato de Portugal.

== Notable players ==
- (Portugal) Vítor Baptista
