= S.C. Espinho =

Portuguese association football club

Espinho
- Full name: Sporting Clube de Espinho
- Founded: 1914
- Ground: Parque de Jogos Joaquim Domingos Maia, Santa Maria da Feira, Portugal
- Capacity: 500
- Chairman: Bernardo Gomes de Almeida
- Manager: Pedro Tiago Paiva Leite
- League: AF Aveiro Campeonato Sabseg
- 2024–25: AF Aveiro Campeonato Sabseg, 3rd
- Website: http://www.scespinho.pt/
Home colours	Away colours

Sporting Clube de Espinho, also known as Sporting de Espinho, is a Portuguese sports club from the city of Espinho in the Aveiro district. Besides football, the club has volleyball and handball departments that usually compete in the major Portuguese top leagues. Other sport departments are those in athletics, swimming and futsal.

== History ==
Founded in 1914, it is one of the oldest clubs in Portugal. In 1925, SC Espinho's football team reached the semifinals of the Campeonato de Portugal, their highest round to date. The team also played 11 seasons in the Portuguese First Division between 1975 and 1997. They currently compete in AF Aveiro Campeonato Sabseg.

The football team played their home games at Estádio Comendador Manuel Violas in Espinho, until 2018. Since 2018, the team has been playing in temporary stadiums such as: Estadio do Bolhão (2018–2020), Estadio Marques da Silva and, currently, Parque de Jogos Joaquim Domingos Maia. The club is aiming is to play in the future municipal stadium of the city of Espinho.

== Notable players ==
- (Portugal) Fernando Couto (youth)

== Managerial history ==
- (Portugal) António Simões (1986)

== Honours ==
- Segunda Liga: 1
  - 1991–92
- Portuguese Second Division: 1
  - 2003–04
- Taça Ribeiro dos Reis: 1
  - 1966–67
- AF Aveiro Championship: 10
  - 1924–25, 1925–26, 1926–27, 1927–28, 1929–30, 1931–32, 1933–34, 1940–41, 1943–44, 1944–45
- AF Aveiro First Division: 4
  - 1947–48, 1950–51, 1960–61, 2016–17
- Taça de Honra do Porto: 1
  - 1917–18

== League and cup history ==
Season		Pos.	Pl.	W	D	L	GS	GA	P	Portuguese Cup	Notes
1974–1975	1D	16	30	4	7	19	25	64	15		Relegated
1977–1978	1D	14	30	8	6	16	30	52	22		Relegated
1979–1980	1D	7	30	11	6	13	29	42	28		
1980–1981	1D	9	30	9	9	12	26	35	27		
1981–1982	1D	10	30	7	11	12	32	42	25		
1982–1983	1D	13	30	9	7	14	23	37	25		
1983–1984	1D	16	30	5	7	18	19	45	17		Relegated
1987–1988	1D	6	38	13	14	11	42	38	40		Best Classification Ever
1988–1989	1D	17	38	12	8	18	45	57	32		Relegated
1992–1993	1D	17	34	9	10	15	38	55	28		Relegated
1996–1997	1D	16	34	9	6	19	27	56	33		Relegated
2007–2008	2DH	2	24	11	9	4	38	26	42	Round 3	
