= 2004–05 in Portuguese football =

The 2004–05 season in Portuguese football saw Benfica clinch the SuperLiga Galp Energia title after almost 11 years without the championship. The SuperLiga had one of the most competitive years, with both Braga and Boavista fighting for the title for a reasonable amount of time, closing the gap on the Big Three of Benfica, Porto and Sporting CP. The Big Three all managed to qualify for the 2005–06 UEFA Champions League, while Braga, Vitória de Guimarães and Vitória de Setúbal qualified for the 2005–06 UEFA Cup. Benfica did not manage to achieve the double, losing to Vitória de Setúbal in the 2004–05 Taça de Portugal final.

In the League of Honour, Paços de Ferreira won the title and alongside newcomers Naval 1º de Maio and former competitors Estrela da Amadora secured their place in the first level of Portuguese football for 2005–06.

The Portuguese teams that qualified for the UEFA competitions in the 2003–04 season were Porto and Benfica in the Champions League; Sporting CP, Braga, Martítimo and Nacional in the UEFA Cup; and União de Leiria in the 2003 UEFA Intertoto Cup. Early in the season, Porto lost the 2003 UEFA Super Cup to 2002–03 Champions League victors Milan. Porto would ultimately reach the round of 16 of the Champions League, where they were eliminated by Internazionale. In the middle of the season, Porto also won their second Intercontinental Cup against Once Caldas. Meanwhile, Sporting CP managed to reach the UEFA Cup Final (which was already chosen to be played at Sporting's Estádio José de Alvalade) where they lost to CSKA Moscow. The fact that Leiria reached the finals of the Intertoto Cup is also noteworthy.

Meanwhile, the Portugal national football team managed to secure a comfortable position that would prove decisive in the qualification for the FIFA World Cup 2006.

== Honours ==
Competition	Winner
Intercontinental Cup	Porto
SuperLiga Galp Energia	Benfica
Cup of Portugal	Vitória Setúbal
SuperCup Cândido de Oliveira	Porto
League of Honour	Paços de Ferreira
Second Division B	FC Vizela (North); Sporting Covilhã (Centre); FC Barreirense (South)
Terceira Divisão	«Os Sandinenses» GDRC (A); Aliados FC do Lordelo (B); SL Nelas (C); AD Portomosense (D); Benfica B (E); Silves FC (F); FC Madalena (Azores)

== SuperLiga ==
After almost 11 years, the longest "drought" period in Benfica's history comes to an end. It was an "awkward" season, mainly due to the inconsistency of the perennial title candidates. Never a team had won the championship with such a small number of points since victories awarded three points. The 65 points of Benfica would only be sufficient to manage a fourth-place finish the year before and, considering a percentage of points awarded, their score of 64% would not have been enough to place them in first or second in any other of the previous Portuguese championships. Inconsistency was present in Benfica's season, but their main rivals were no better. In the upper part of the table, Braga's season was noteworthy: it was fighting for the title only four games before the end of the season.

=== Promoted teams ===
These teams were promoted from the League of Honour at the start of the season:

- Estoril (champion)
- Vitória de Setúbal (2nd placed)
- Penafiel (3rd placed)

=== Final standings ===
Position	Team	Played	Won	Drawn	Lost	For	Against	Difference	Points
1	Benfica	34	19	8	7	51	31	+20	65
2	Porto	34	17	11	6	39	26	+13	62
3	Sporting CP	34	18	7	9	66	36	+30	61
4	Braga	34	16	10	8	45	28	+17	58
5	Vitória de Guimarães	34	15	9	10	38	29	+9	54
6	Boavista	34	13	11	10	39	43	-4	50
7	Marítimo	34	12	13	9	39	32	+7	49
8	Rio Ave	34	10	17	7	35	35	0	47
9	Belenenses	34	13	7	14	38	34	+4	46
10	Vitória de Setúbal	34	11	11	12	46	45	+1	44
11	Penafiel	34	13	4	17	39	53	-14	43
12	Nacional	34	12	5	17	46	48	-2	41
13	Gil Vicente	34	11	7	16	34	40	-6	40
14	Académica	34	9	11	14	29	41	-12	38
15	União de Leiria	34	8	14	12	29	36	-7	38
16	Moreirense	34	7	13	14	30	43	-13	34
17	Estoril	34	8	6	20	38	55	-17	30
18	Beira-Mar	34	6	12	16	30	56	-26	30

=== UEFA competitions and relegations ===
These teams were qualified for the UEFA competitions of 2005–06:

- UEFA Champions League
  - Champions Benfica (group stage)
  - 2nd placed Porto (group stage)
  - 3rd placed Sporting CP (third qualifying round)
- UEFA Cup
  - 4th placed Braga (first round)
  - 5th placed Vitória de Guimarães (first round)
  - Cup winner Vitória de Setúbal (first round)

These teams were relegated to the League of Honour at the end of the season:

- Relegations
  - 16th placed Moreirense
  - 17th placed Estoril
  - 18th placed Beira-Mar

=== Top scorers ===
- 1 Liédson (Sporting CP) 24
- =2 João Tomás (Braga) 15
- =2 Simão (Benfica) 15
- 4 Wesley (Penafiel) 14
- 5 Henry Antchouet (Belenenses) 12
- =6 Albert Meyong (Vitória de Setúbal) 11
- =6 Benni McCarthy (Porto) 11
- 8 Zé Manuel (Boavista) 10
- =9 Roberto (Penafiel) 9
- =9 Wender (Braga) 9
- =9 Jorginho (Vitória de Setúbal) 9

== UEFA competitions ==
=== UEFA Champions League ===
==== Porto ====
UEFA Champions League group H

Match One	14 September 2004	Porto 0–0 CSKA Moscow
Match Two	29 September 2004	Chelsea 3–1 Porto
Match Three	20 October 2004	Paris Saint-Germain 2–0 Porto
Match Four	2 November 2004	Porto 0–0 Paris Saint-Germain
Match Five	24 November 2004	CSKA Moscow 0–1 Porto
Match Six	7 December 2004	Porto 2–1 Chelsea

UEFA Champions League round of 16

1st leg	23 February 2005	Porto 1–1 Internazionale
2nd leg	15 March 2005	Internazionale 3–1 Porto

==== Benfica ====
UEFA Champions League third qualifying round

1st leg	10 August 2004	Benfica 1–0 Anderlecht
2nd leg	24 August 2004	Anderlecht 3–0 Benfica

UEFA Cup first round

1st leg	16 September 2004	Dukla Banská Bystrica 0–3 Benfica
2nd leg	30 September 2004	Benfica 2–0 Dukla Banská Bystrica

UEFA Cup group F

Match One	21 October 2004	Benfica 4–2 Heerenveen
Match Two	4 November 2004	VfB Stuttgart 3–0 Benfica
Match Three	25 November 2004	Benfica 2–0 Dinamo Zagreb
Match Four	2 December 2004	Beveren 0–3 Benfica

UEFA Cup round of 32

1st leg	17 February 2005	CSKA Moscow 2–0 Benfica
2nd leg	24 February 2005	Benfica 1–1 CSKA Moscow

==== Sporting CP ====
UEFA Cup first round

1st leg	16 September 2004	Sporting CP 2–0 Rapid Wien
2nd leg	30 September 2004	Rapid Wien 0–0 Sporting CP

UEFA Cup group D

Match Two	4 November 2004	Sporting CP 4–1 Panionios
Match Three	25 November 2004	Dinamo Tbilisi 0–4 Sporting CP
Match Four	1 December 2004	Sporting CP 0–1 Sochaux
Match Five	16 December 2004	Newcastle United 1–1 Sporting CP

UEFA Cup round of 32

1st leg	16 February 2005	Sporting CP 2–1 Feyenoord
2nd leg	24 February 2005	Feyenoord 1–2 Sporting CP

UEFA Cup round of 16

1st leg	10 March 2005	Middlesbrough 2–3 Sporting CP
2nd leg	17 March 2005	Sporting CP 1–0 Middlesbrough

UEFA Cup quarter-finals

1st leg	7 April 2005	Newcastle United 1–0 Sporting CP
2nd leg	14 April 2005	Sporting CP 4–1 Newcastle United

UEFA Cup semi-finals

1st leg	28 April 2005	Sporting CP 2–1 AZ Alkmaar
2nd leg	5 May 2005	AZ Alkmaar 3–2 Sporting CP (a.e.t.)

UEFA Cup final

Final	18 May 2005	Sporting CP 1–3 CSKA Moscow

==== Braga ====
UEFA Cup first round

1st leg	16 September 2004	Hearts 3–1 Braga
2nd leg	30 September 2004	Braga 2–2 Hearts

==== Marítimo ====
UEFA Cup first round

1st leg	16 September 2004	Marítimo 1–0 Rangers
2nd leg	30 September 2004	Rangers 1–0 Marítimo (a.e.t.; 4–2 on penalties)

==== Nacional ====
UEFA Cup first round

1st leg	16 September 2004	Sevilla 2–0 Nacional
2nd leg	30 September 2004	Nacional 1–2 Sevilla

==== União de Leiria ====
UEFA Intertoto Cup third round

1st leg	17 July 2004	Shinnik Yaroslavl 1–4 União de Leiria
2nd leg	24 July 2004	União de Leiria 2–1 Shinnik Yaroslavl

UEFA Intertoto Cup semi-finals

1st leg	28 July 2004	Genk 0–0 União de Leiria
2nd leg	24 July 2004	União de Leiria 2–0 Genk

UEFA Intertoto Cup finals

1st leg	10 August 2004	Lille 0–0 União de Leiria
2nd leg	24 July 2004	União de Leiria 0–2 Lille (a.e.t.)

== Taça de Portugal ==
Vitória de Setúbal won their third Cup after beating Benfica 2–1 at the final played 29 May in the Estádio do Jamor. Simão scored first for Benfica, a penalty in the fifth minute, but an own goal by Ricardo Rocha in the 26th minute and another by Albert Meyong for Setúbal turned the game around.

=== Round of 16 to Final ===
Round of 16
1	Vitória de Setúbal	3
1	Vitória de Guimarães	1
2B	Oliveira do Hospital	0
1	Braga	1
1	Académica	1
1	Marítimo	2
1	Nacional	1 (3)
3	Boavista (a.e.t.)	1 (4)
2	Estrela da Amadora	1
1	Penafiel	0
3	Pinhalnovense	1
1	Belenenses	2
1	Benfica (a.e.t., pen.)	2 (3) (7)
1	Sporting CP	2 (3) (6)
1	Beira-Mar	-
-	bye	-

Quarter-Finals
1	Vitória de Setúbal	3
1	Braga	2
1	Marítimo	0
1	Boavista	2
2	Estrela da Amadora (pen.)	0 (8)
1	Belenenses	0 (7)
1	Benfica	1
1	Beira-Mar	0

Semi-Finals
1	Vitória de Setúbal (a.e.t.)	1 (2)
1	Boavista	1 (1)
2	Estrela da Amadora	0
1	Benfica	3

Final
1	Vitória de Setúbal	2
1	Benfica	1

== League of Honour ==
=== Promoted teams ===
These teams were promoted from the Second Division B at the start of the season:

- Gondomar (North Zone champion)
- Espinho (Centre Zone champion)
- Olhanense (South Zone champion)

=== Final standings ===
Position	Team	Played	Won	Drawn	Lost	For	Against	Difference	Points
1	Paços de Ferreira	34	20	9	5	61	43	+18	69
2	Naval 1º de Maio	34	17	11	6	53	30	+23	62
3	Estrela da Amadora	34	17	9	8	47	30	+17	60
4	Marco	34	13	12	9	51	43	+8	51
5	Desportivo das Aves	34	15	6	13	45	35	+10	51
6	Leixões	34	14	8	12	40	33	+7	50
7	Feirense	34	14	7	13	45	48	-3	49
8	Maia	34	13	10	11	46	36	+10	49
9	Olhanense	34	11	11	12	32	32	0	44
10	Varzim	34	11	10	13	37	42	-5	43
11	Felgueiras	34	11	9	14	37	44	-7	42
12	Ovarense	34	11	8	15	40	51	-9	41
13	Alverca	34	11	6	17	28	40	-12	39
14	Portimonense	34	10	9	15	40	49	-9	39
15	Santa Clara	34	11	6	17	39	50	-11	39
16	Gondomar	34	11	6	17	38	45	-7	39
17	Chaves	34	9	10	15	24	38	-14	37
18	Espinho	34	9	9	16	37	51	-14	36

=== Promotions and relegations ===
The following teams were promoted to the SuperLiga (future Liga betandwin.com) for 2005–06:

- Promotions
  - Champions – Paços de Ferreira
  - 2nd placed – Naval 1º de Maio
  - 3rd – Estrela da Amadora

The following teams were relegated to the Second Division for 2005–06:

- Relegations
  - 11th placed – Felgueiras (due to economical problems)
  - 13th placed – Alverca (due to economical problems)
  - 18th placed – Espinho

=== Top scorers ===
Place	Scorer	Goals	Team
1.	(Brazil) Rincón	18	Paços de Ferreira
2.	(Brazil) Evandro	17	Maia
3.	(Brazil) Hermes	16	Marco
4.	(Brazil) Hugo Henrique	15	Santa Clara
4.	(Portugal) João Pedro	15	Leixões
6.	(Brazil) Wesley	14	Gondomar
7.	(Portugal) Rui Miguel	13	Desportivo das Aves
8.	(Brazil) Didi	12	Marco
9.	(Cape Verde) Mateus	11	Portimonense
9.	(Brazil) Serjão	11	Portimonense

== Portugal national team ==
Date	Venue	Opponents	Score	Comp	Portugal scorers
September 4, 2004	Stadionas Skonto, Riga	Latvia	0-2	WCQ3	Cristiano Ronaldo, Pauleta
September 8, 2004	Estádio Municipal de Leiria, Leiria	Estonia	4-0	WCQ3	Cristiano Ronaldo, Hélder Postiga (2), Pauleta
October 9, 2004	Rheinpark Stadion, Vaduz	Liechtenstein	2-2	WCQ3	Own goal, Pauleta
October 13, 2004	Estádio José Alvalade, Lisbon	Russia	7-1	WCQ3	Pauleta, Cristiano Ronaldo (2), Deco, Simão, Petit (2)
November 17, 2004	Stade Josy Barthel, Luxembourg	Luxembourg	0-5	WCQ3	Own goal, Cristiano Ronaldo, Maniche, Pauleta (2)
February 9, 2005	Lansdowne Road, Dublin	Rep. Ireland	1-0	F	-
March 26, 2005	Estádio Cidade de Barcelos, Barcelos	Canada	4-1	F	Manuel Fernandes, Pauleta, Hélder Postiga, Nuno Gomes
June 4, 2005	Estádio da Luz, Lisbon	Slovakia	2-0	WCQ3	Fernando Meira, Cristiano Ronaldo
June 8, 2005	A.Le Coq Arena, Tallinn	Estonia	0-1	WCQ3	Cristiano Ronaldo

KEY: WCQ3 = World Cup Qualification match - Group 3; F = Friendly
