= Toy (footballer, born 1977) =

Cape Verdean footballer

Personal information
- Full name: Vítor Manuel Andrade Gomes da Costa
- Date of birth: 15 June 1977 (age 49)
- Place of birth: Lisbon, Portugal
- Height: 1.72 m (5 ft 8 in)
- Position: Forward

Youth career
- 1991–1993: Algés
- 1993–1996: Vila Fria

Senior career*
| Years | Team | Apps | (Gls) |
| 1996–1997 | Coruchense | | |
| 1997–1998 | Samora Correia | | |
| 1998–1999 | Sintrense | 25 | (8) |
| 1999–2001 | Benfica B | 31 | (10) |
| 2000–2001 | Benfica | 4 | (0) |
| 2001–2003 | Salgueiros | 44 | (5) |
| 2003–2004 | Felgueiras | 32 | (14) |
| 2004–2005 | Olhanense | 42 | (7) |
| 2006 | Al-Hazem | ? | (2) |
| 2006–2007 | Al-Qadsiah | | |
| 2007–2012 | Olhanense | 111 | (16) |
| 2012–2013 | Doxa | 25 | (2) |
| 2014–2015 | 1º Dezembro | 23 | (4) |
| 2015–2016 | Futebol Benfica | | |
| Total | | 337 | (68) |

International career
| 2008 | Cape Verde | 5 | (0) |
- * Club domestic league appearances and goals

Vítor Manuel Andrade Gomes da Costa (born 15 June 1977), commonly known as Toy, is a Cape Verdean former footballer who played as a forward.

== Club career ==
Born in Lisbon, Toy spent the bulk of his professional career in his adopted country, Portugal, first starting in amateur football. In 1999 he signed with Primeira Liga giants S.L. Benfica, but played mainly with its reserves during his two-year spell.

Toy represented mainly S.C. Olhanense, first arriving at the Algarve club in 2004 then returning in summer 2007 after a spell in Saudi Arabia. In the 2008–09 season, in the second division, he contributed with six goals to help his team return to the top flight after a 34-year absence.

In the following three campaigns, Toy was relatively used by Olhanense, mainly as a substitute.

== International career ==
Toy opted to represent Cape Verde internationally, receiving his first callup in May 2008 at nearly 31 years of age.

== Club statistics ==
| Club | Season | League | | | Cup | | Other | | Total | |
| Club | Season | Division | Apps | Goals | Apps | Goals | Apps | Goals | Apps | Goals |
|---|---|---|---|---|---|---|---|---|---|---|
| Sintrense | 1998–99 | Portuguese Second Division | 25 | 8 | 0 | 0 | 0 | 0 | 25 | 8 |
| Sintrense | Total | | 24 | 8 | 0 | 0 | 0 | 0 | 24 | 8 |
| Benfica B | 1999–2000 | Portuguese Second Division | 20 | 7 | 0 | 0 | 0 | 0 | 20 | 7 |
| Benfica B | 2000–01 | Portuguese Second Division | 7 | 3 | 0 | 0 | 0 | 0 | 7 | 3 |
| Benfica B | Total | | 27 | 10 | 0 | 0 | 0 | 0 | 27 | 10 |
| Benfica | 1999–2000 | Primeira Liga | 0 | 0 | 0 | 0 | 0 | 0 | 0 | 0 |
| Benfica | 2000–01 | Primeira Liga | 4 | 0 | 0 | 0 | 0 | 0 | 4 | 0 |
| Benfica | Total | | 4 | 0 | 0 | 0 | 0 | 0 | 4 | 0 |
| Salgueiros | 2001–02 | Primeira Liga | 33 | 5 | 6 | 2 | 0 | 0 | 39 | 7 |
| Salgueiros | 2002–03 | Segunda Liga | 11 | 0 | 1 | 0 | 0 | 0 | 12 | 0 |
| Salgueiros | Total | | 44 | 5 | 7 | 2 | 0 | 0 | 51 | 7 |
| Felgueiras | 2003–04 | Segunda Liga | 32 | 14 | 2 | 2 | 0 | 0 | 34 | 16 |
| Felgueiras | Total | | 32 | 14 | 2 | 2 | 0 | 0 | 34 | 16 |
| Olhanense | 2004–05 | Segunda Liga | 29 | 4 | 1 | 0 | 0 | 0 | 30 | 4 |
| Olhanense | 2005–06 | Segunda Liga | 13 | 3 | 1 | 0 | 0 | 0 | 14 | 3 |
| Olhanense | 2007–08 | Segunda Liga | 30 | 5 | 2 | 1 | 0 | 0 | 32 | 6 |
| Olhanense | 2008–09 | Segunda Liga | 28 | 6 | 7 | 1 | 0 | 0 | 35 | 7 |
| Olhanense | 2009–10 | Primeira Liga | 21 | 3 | 3 | 0 | 0 | 0 | 24 | 3 |
| Olhanense | 2010–11 | Primeira Liga | 16 | 1 | 7 | 1 | 0 | 0 | 23 | 2 |
| Olhanense | 2011–12 | Primeira Liga | 16 | 1 | 4 | 1 | 0 | 0 | 20 | 2 |
| Olhanense | Total | | 153 | 23 | 25 | 4 | 0 | 0 | 178 | 27 |
| Doxa | 2012–13 | Cypriot First Division | 25 | 2 | 0 | 0 | 0 | 0 | 25 | 2 |
| Doxa | Total | | 25 | 2 | 0 | 0 | 0 | 0 | 25 | 2 |
| Career total | | | 310 | 62 | 34 | 8 | 0 | 0 | 344 | 70 |
