= 1990–91 Taça de Portugal =

Tournament details
- Country: Portugal
- Dates: September 1990 – 2 June 1991

Final positions
- Champions: Porto (7th title)
- Runners-up: Beira-Mar

The 1990–91 Taça de Portugal was the 52nd edition of the Portuguese football knockout tournament, organized by the Portuguese Football Federation (FPF). The 1990–91 Taça de Portugal began in September 1990. The final was played on 2 June 1991 at the Estádio Nacional.

Estrela da Amadora were the previous holders, having defeated S.C. Farense 2–0 in the previous season's final. Cup holders Estrela da Amadora were eliminated in the seventh round by cup finalists Beira-Mar. In the final, Porto defeated Beira-Mar 3–1 to claim a seventh Taça de Portugal trophy. As a result of Porto winning the domestic cup competition, the Portistas faced 1990–91 Primeira Divisão winners Benfica in the 1991 Supertaça Cândido de Oliveira.

== Sixth round ==
Ties were played between the 27 February and 13 March, whilst replays were played at a later date.

27 February 1991	Académica de Coimbra (II)	1–3	Boavista (I)	Estádio Municipal de Coimbra, Coimbra
	Coelho 7'		Alcântara 25', 39', 69'

27 February 1991	Arsenal de Braga (IV)	2–0	Mirandense (III)	Braga

27 February 1991	Beira-Mar (II)	3–0	União da Madeira (I)	Estádio Mário Duarte, Aveiro

27 February 1991	Braga (I)	2–0	Lousada (III)	Estádio Primeiro de Maio, Braga

27 February 1991	Estrela da Amadora (I)	2–2	Gil Vicente (I)	Estádio José Gomes, Amadora

27 February 1991	Famalicão (I)	3–0	Arsenal Bessa (IV)	Estádio Municipal 22 de Junho, Vila Nova de Famalicão

27 February 1991	Feirense (II)	1–0	Rio Ave (II)	Estádio Marcolino de Castro, Santa Maria da Feira

27 February 1991	Marítimo (I)	3–2	Trofense (III)	Estádio dos Barreiros, Funchal

27 February 1991	Ovarense (III)	4–2	Olhanense (III)	Estádio Marques da Silva, Ovar
16:00

27 February 1991	Portimonense (II)	1–0	Lusitano de Évora (III)	Estádio Municipal de Portimão, Portimão

27 February 1991	Sporting CP (I)	2–0	Farense (I)	Estádio José Alvalade, Lisbon
	Balakov 41'; Oceano 50'

27 February 1991	Tirsense (I)	2–0	Varzim (II)	Estádio Abel Alves de Figueiredo, Santo Tirso

27 February 1991	Vila Real (III)	0–1	Porto (I)	Complexo Desportivo Monte da Forca, Vila Real
			Paille 11'

27 February 1991	Vitória de Guimarães (I)	3–2	Águeda (II)	Estádio D. Afonso Henriques, Guimarães

27 February 1991	Vizela (III)	3–2	Atlético CP (III)	Estádio do Futebol Clube de Vizela, Vizela

13 March 1991	Vitória de Setúbal (I)	2–3	Benfica (I)	Estádio do Bonfim, Setúbal
			Magnusson 55', 71'; Paneira 73'	Referee: Bento Marques

Replay	Gil Vicente (I)	3–4	Estrela da Amadora (I)	Estádio Adelino Ribeiro Novo, Barcelos

== Seventh round ==
Ties were played on the 27 March, whilst replays where played at a later date.

27 March 1991	Beira-Mar (II)	1–0	Estrela da Amadora (I)	Estádio Mário Duarte, Aveiro

27 March 1991	Benfica (I)	1–0	Marítimo (I)	Estádio da Luz, Lisbon
	Magnusson 47'

27 March 1991	Boavista (I)	2–0	Sporting CP (I)	Estádio do Bessa, Porto
	J. Alves 79'; Bertollazzi 85'

27 March 1991	Braga (I)	3–0	Vizela (III)	Estádio Primeiro de Maio, Braga

27 March 1991	Famalicão (I)	0–1	Porto (I)	Estádio Municipal 22 de Junho, Vila Nova de Famalicão
			P. Pereira 17'

27 March 1991	Feirense (II)	1–0	Vitória de Guimarães (I)	Estádio Marcolino de Castro, Santa Maria da Feira

27 March 1991	Ovarense (I)	1–1	Arsenal de Braga (IV)	Estádio Marques da Silva, Ovar

27 March 1991	Tirsense (I)	2–1	Portimonense (II)	Estádio Abel Alves de Figueiredo, Santo Tirso

Replay	Arsenal de Braga (IV)	1–2	Ovarense (I)	Braga

== Quarter-finals ==
Ties were played on the 17 April.

17 April 1991	Beira-Mar (II)	3–0	Ovarense (I)	Estádio Mário Duarte, Aveiro

17 April 1991	Boavista (I)	1–0	Braga (I)	Estádio do Bessa, Porto

17 April 1991	Feirense (II)	1–0	Tirsense (I)	Estádio Marcolino de Castro, Santa Maria da Feira

17 April 1991	Porto (I)	2–1	Benfica (I)	Estádio das Antas, Porto
	Domingos 45', 80'		Águas 30'

== Semi-finals ==
Ties were played between the 1–9 May.

1 May 1991	Beira-Mar (I)	2–0	Boavista (I)	Estádio Mário Duarte, Aveiro

1 May 1991	Feirense (II)	1–1	Porto (I)	Estádio Marcolino de Castro, Santa Maria da Feira
	Manuel António 90'		Domingos 90'

9 May 1991 Replay	Porto (I)	2–0	Feirense (II)	Estádio das Antas, Porto
	João Pinto 6'; Domingos 30'

== Final ==
2 June 1991
17:00 WEST

Beira-Mar	1–3 (a.e.t.)	Porto
Abdelghani 30'		Domingos 5'; Kostadinov 96'; Magalhães 100'

Estádio Nacional, Oeiras
Referee: Vitor Correia (Santarém)
