= Sérgio Pedro =

Portuguese footballer

Personal information
- Full name: Sérgio Manuel Freitas Pedro
- Date of birth: 17 June 1969 (age 57)
- Place of birth: Luanda, Portuguese Angola
- Height: 1.79 m (5 ft 10 in)
- Position: Midfielder

Youth career
- Trafaria

Senior career*
Years	Team	Apps	(Gls)
1987–1988	Trafaria		
1988–1991	Vitória FC		
1989–1990	→ Rio Ave (loan)		
1991–1992	Montijo		
1992–1993	Maia		
1993–1994	União Torreense		
1994–1996	Nacional		
1996–1998	Leça		
1998–1999	Santa Clara		
2000	Marco		
2000	Trofense		
2001–2002	Leixões		
2003–2005	Silves		
- * Club domestic league appearances and goals

Sérgio Manuel Freitas Pedro (born 17 June 1969) is a retired Angolan-born, Portuguese football midfielder.
