= Igor (footballer, born 1980) =

Brazilian footballer

Personal information
- Full name: Igor de Souza Fonseca
- Date of birth: 19 February 1980 (age 46)
- Place of birth: Maceió, Brazil
- Height: 1.90 m (6 ft 3 in)
- Position: Forward

Youth career
- 1989–1991: Marialvas
- 1993–1995: Gondim
- 1995–1999: Maia

Senior career*
Years	Team	Apps	(Gls)
1998–2003	Maia	62	(29)
1999–2000	→ Pedrouços (loan)	3	(1)
2003–2007	Braga	22	(4)
2003–2004	Braga B	3	(3)
2004–2005	→ Vitória Setúbal (loan)	28	(5)
2005	→ Estrela Amadora (loan)	3	(0)
2006–2007	→ Pontevedra (loan)	50	(19)
2007–2011	Pontevedra	96	(32)
2008	→ Ipatinga (loan)	2	(0)
2009	→ Girona (loan)	15	(3)
2009	→ Levante (loan)	11	(3)
2011	→ Tenerife (loan)	7	(0)
2011–2013	Salamanca	57	(23)
2013–2016	Panthrakikos	77	(24)
2017–2018	Boiro	26	(11)
2018–2019	Maia Lidador	31	(18)
2019–2020	Virgen del Camino	19	(13)
2020–2022	Maia Lidador	44	(18)
Total		556	(206)
- * Club domestic league appearances and goals

Igor de Souza Fonseca (born 19 February 1980), known simply as Igor, is a Brazilian former professional footballer who played as a forward.

== Club career ==
Born in Maceió, Alagoas, Igor made his professional debut in Portugal, with lowly Maia of Liga de Honra. Subsequently, he played two full seasons in the Primeira Liga, with Braga and Vitória de Setúbal, contributing four league goals at the former club as they finished fifth and qualified for the UEFA Cup.

Halfway through the 2005–06 Portuguese League campaign, Braga relocated Igor's loan from Estrela da Amadora in the same league to Spain's Pontevedra, a side in the Segunda División B. The Galicians, in turn, after the move was made permanent in summer 2007, loaned the player several times during his contract, and he totalled 26 matches and six goals in the Segunda División for Girona and Levante, before returning to Pontevedra in January 2010 (also had a brief loan spell back in Brazil).

Igor suffered two relegations in 2010–11, one with Pontevedra and the other with Tenerife, joining the latter – in the second tier – in January 2011, on loan. In July 2011, he signed with another team in the country, Salamanca, moving to the Super League Greece with Panthrakikos in the summer of 2013 after the club folded.

== Personal life ==
Igor's younger brother Yuri was also a footballer and a forward. They shared teams at Maia (where they arrived at a young age) and Pontevedra.

His cousin, Charles, also played several seasons in Spain, and also represented Pontevedra.

== Honours ==
Vitória Setúbal

- Taça de Portugal: 2004–05
