= Leandro Almeida Silva =

Leandro Almeida Silva may refer to:

- Leandro Almeida Silva (footballer, born 1977), Brazilian footballer
- Leandro Almeida Silva (footballer, born 1987), Brazilian footballer
