= Mateus Lopes =

Cape Verdean footballer (born 1975)

Mateus
Personal information
- Full name: Mateus Henrique Fonseca Lopes
- Date of birth: 7 December 1975 (age 50)
- Place of birth: São Vicente, Cape Verde
- Height: 1.84 m (6 ft 0 in)
- Position: Striker

Youth career
- 1986–1992: Beira-Mar
- 1992–1994: Gafanha

Senior career*
Years	Team	Apps	(Gls)
1994–1995	Gafanha		
1995–1997	Oliveirense	52	(21)
1997–2000	Vizela	77	(25)
2000–2001	Felgueiras	22	(2)
2001–2002	Ovarense	30	(8)
2002–2003	Marco	29	(10)
2003–2004	Chaves	24	(2)
2004–2006	Portimonense	31	(10)
2005	→ Assyriska (loan)	4	(0)
2006	Petro Atlético	6	(0)
2006–2007	Santa Clara	30	(5)
2007–2008	Beira-Mar	13	(2)
2008–2009	Rio Ave	15	(1)
2009	Doxa	8	(0)
2009–2010	Frenaros 2000	22	(5)
2010–2011	Ayia Napa	11	(0)
2012	Ethnikos Assia	10	(2)
2012	Omonia Aradippou	12	(0)
2013	Farense	12	(1)
2013	Quarteirense	3	(0)
2013–2014	Alcanenense	13	(1)
2014–2015	Almancilense		
2015–2016	Paredes	13	(3)
2016–2018	Maia Lidador	38	(7)
2018–2019	União Nogueirense		
2020–2021	São Romão		
Total		475	(105)

International career
2003–2008	Cape Verde	8	(0)
- * Club domestic league appearances and goals

Mateus Henrique Fonseca Lopes (born 7 December 1975), known simply as Mateus, is a Cape Verdean former professional footballer who played as a striker. He also held a Portuguese passport, due to the many years he spent in the country.
