= 1990–91 Segunda Divisão de Honra =

57th season of second-tier football league in Portugal

Segunda Divisão de Honra
- Season: 1990–91
- Champions: F.C. Paços de Ferreira
- Promoted: F.C. Paços de Ferreira; G.D. Estoril Praia; S.C.U. Torreense
- Relegated: 7 teams

The 1990–91 Segunda Divisão de Honra season was the first season of the competition and the 57th season of recognised second-tier football in Portugal.

== Overview ==
The league was contested by 20 teams with Paços de Ferreira winning the championship and gaining promotion to the Primeira Diviasão along with Estoril Praia and Torreense. At the other end of the table O Elvas, Freamunde, Varzim, Maia, Águeda, Lusitano VRSA and Barreirense were relegated to the Segunda Divisão.

== League table ==
| Pos | Team | Pld | W | D | L | GF | GA | GD | Pts | Promotion or relegation |
|---|---|---|---|---|---|---|---|---|---|---|
| 1 | Paços de Ferreira (C, P) | 38 | 21 | 9 | 8 | 52 | 34 | +18 | 51 | Promotion to Primeira Divisão |
| 2 | Estoril (P) | 38 | 17 | 12 | 9 | 48 | 28 | +20 | 46 | Promotion to Primeira Divisão |
| 3 | Torreense (P) | 38 | 16 | 13 | 9 | 58 | 43 | +15 | 45 (Note: ACV 0–0 TOR; TOR 3–1 ACV) | Promotion to Primeira Divisão |
| 4 | Académico de Viseu | 38 | 16 | 13 | 9 | 43 | 34 | +9 | 45 | |
| 5 | Benfica Castelo Branco | 38 | 16 | 12 | 10 | 35 | 31 | +4 | 44 (Note: BCB 2–0 ACA; ACA 0–0 BCB) | |
| 6 | Académica | 38 | 17 | 10 | 11 | 41 | 32 | +9 | 44 | |
| 7 | Leixões | 38 | 15 | 13 | 10 | 49 | 41 | +8 | 43 | |
| 8 | Portimonense | 38 | 18 | 6 | 14 | 57 | 34 | +23 | 42 | |
| 9 | União de Leiria | 38 | 14 | 13 | 11 | 45 | 35 | +10 | 41 | |
| 10 | Feirense | 38 | 15 | 10 | 13 | 37 | 39 | −2 | 40 (Note: FEI 1–0 SCE; SCE 1–1 FEI) | |
| 11 | Espinho | 38 | 14 | 12 | 12 | 42 | 31 | +11 | 40 | |
| 12 | Desportivo das Aves | 38 | 14 | 11 | 13 | 44 | 41 | +3 | 39 | |
| 13 | Louletano | 38 | 14 | 10 | 14 | 47 | 44 | +3 | 38 (Note: ELV 1–5 LOU; LOU 2–1 ELV) | |
| 14 | O Elvas (R) | 38 | 14 | 10 | 14 | 45 | 45 | 0 | 38 | Relegation to Segunda Divisão B |
| 15 | Freamunde (R) | 38 | 13 | 7 | 18 | 55 | 69 | −14 | 33 (Note: VAR 2–2 FRM; FRM 2–1 VAR) | Relegation to Segunda Divisão B |
| 16 | Varzim (R) | 38 | 10 | 13 | 15 | 42 | 39 | +3 | 33 | Relegation to Segunda Divisão B |
| 17 | Maia (R) | 38 | 13 | 5 | 20 | 52 | 61 | −9 | 31 | Relegation to Segunda Divisão B |
| 18 | Águeda (R) | 38 | 10 | 5 | 23 | 41 | 73 | −32 | 25 | Relegation to Segunda Divisão B |
| 19 | Lusitano VRSA (R) | 38 | 4 | 13 | 21 | 16 | 45 | −29 | 21 (Note: BAR 0–0 LVR; LVR 0–0 BAR) | Relegation to Segunda Divisão B |
| 20 | Barreirense (R) | 38 | 4 | 13 | 21 | 26 | 76 | −50 | 21 | Relegation to Segunda Divisão B |

Rules for classification: 1) points; 2) head-to-head points; 3) head-to-head goal difference; 4) head-to-head goals scored; 5) goal difference; 6) number of goals scored.
(C) Champions; (P) Promoted; (R) Relegated
