= Marco Abreu =

Angolan footballer

Personal information
- Full name: Marco Paulo Coimbra de Abreu
- Date of birth: 8 December 1974 (age 51)
- Place of birth: Lubango, Angola
- Height: 1.80 m (5 ft 11 in)
- Position: Left back

Youth career
- Viseu e Benfica
- 1990–1991: Drizes
- 1991–1993: Oliveira Frades

Senior career*
Years	Team	Apps	(Gls)
1994	Sampedrense		
1994–1998	Académico Viseu	81	(1)
1998–1999	União Madeira	50	(3)
2000	Trofense	10	(0)
2000–2001	Varzim	6	(0)
2001–2003	Covilhã	58	(4)
2003–2004	Ovarense	47	(2)
2004–2005	Olhanense	14	(0)
2005–2007	Portimonense	34	(3)
2007–2010	Espinho	82	(12)
2010–2014	Avanca	58	(2)
Total		440	(27)

International career
2006	Angola	3	(0)
- * Club domestic league appearances and goals

Marco Paulo Coimbra de Abreu (born 8 December 1974) is an Angolan retired footballer who played as a left back.

== Football career ==
Abreu was born in Lubango, Huíla Province, to a White African-Portuguese family. He left for Portugal at the age of two and, during his professional career, represented Académico de Viseu FC, C.F. União, C.D. Trofense, Varzim SC, S.C. Covilhã, A.D. Ovarense, S.C. Olhanense, Portimonense S.C. and S.C. Espinho, playing mainly in the second division where he amassed totals of 204 games and nine goals over the course of nine seasons; he added 154/15 in the third level.

Internationally, Abreu appeared for Angola at the 2006 FIFA World Cup as a replacement for suspended Yamba Asha, but made no appearances in the tournament held in Germany. He had made his debut at the 2006 Africa Cup of Nations in Egypt, where he was also injured.
