= Cássio (footballer, born 1983) =

Brazilian footballer

Personal information
- Full name: Cássio Vargas Barbosa
- Date of birth: 25 November 1983 (age 42)
- Place of birth: Porto Alegre, Brazil
- Height: 1.86 m (6 ft 1 in)
- Position: Striker

Senior career*
Years	Team	Apps	(Gls)
2004–2005	Corinthians Alagoano		
2005	→ Maia (loan)	16	(9)
2006	→ Chaves (loan)	17	(12)
2006–2008	Nacional	27	(4)
2008–2010	União Leiria	52	(29)
2010–2012	Rapid București	30	(7)
2012	→ Beira-Mar (loan)	9	(1)
2012	Ettifaq FC	10	(0)
2013	Gwangju FC	2	(0)
2013	AEL Limassol	10	(1)
2014	São Caetano	4	(0)
2015	Fortaleza	0	(0)
2015	Aves	5	(0)
2016	Leixões	15	(2)
2017	Treze		
Total		197	(65)
- * Club domestic league appearances and goals as of 21 August 2019

Cássio Vargas Barbosa, also known as Cássio, (born 25 November 1983) is a Brazilian former professional footballer who played as a striker. He was born in Porto Alegre.
