= Humberto (footballer, born 1979) =

Portuguese footballer

Jorge Humberto
Personal information
- Full name: Jorge Humberto Rodrigues Cunha
- Date of birth: 21 August 1979 (age 47)
- Place of birth: Vila do Conde, Portugal
- Height: 1.83 m (6 ft 0 in)
- Position: Centre back

Youth career
- 1990–1998: Rio Ave

Senior career*
Years	Team	Apps	(Gls)
1998–2001	Rio Ave	35	(1)
2001–2002	Braga B	10	(0)
2002–2003	Covilhã	17	(0)
2003–2005	Ovarense	59	(4)
2005–2008	Santa Clara	20	(0)
2008–2009	Rio Ave	0	(0)
2009–2010	Oliveirense	22	(1)
2010–2011	Vianense	32	(10)
2011–2012	Varzim	12	(1)
2012–2013	Melgacense	15	(7)
2013–2014	Valenciano	14	(2)
2014–2015	Moreira do Lima	34	(14)
2015–2016	Ponte da Barca	29	(10)

International career
2000	Portugal U20	1	(0)
- * Club domestic league appearances and goals as of 4 December 2016

Jorge Humberto Rodrigues Cunha (born 21 August 1979), known as Humberto, is a Portuguese footballer who plays as a central defender.

== Football career ==
Born in Vila do Conde, Humberto emerged through local Rio Ave FC's youth system. He made his Primeira Liga debut on 18 January 1999, in a 1–1 home draw against FC Porto where he came on as a late substitute.

From 2001 onwards, Humberto would spend the following seven years with several teams, almost all in the second division. He represented S.C. Braga's reserves, S.C. Covilhã, A.D. Ovarense and C.D. Santa Clara, serving mostly as a backup.

For 2008–09, Humberto returned to the top level with his first club, but failed to appear in any league games during the entire season. Released in the ensuing summer, he returned to division two and signed with U.D. Oliveirense.
