= 2000–01 Segunda Liga =

67th season of second-tier football league in Portugal

Segunda Liga
- Season: 2000–01
- Champions: CD Santa Clara
- Promoted: CD Santa Clara; Varzim SC; Vitória Setúbal
- Relegated: Imortal DC; FC Marco; SC Freamunde
- Matches: 306
- Goals: 849 (2.77 per match)
- Top goalscorer: Brandão (Santa Clara) (24)

The 2000–01 Segunda Liga season was the 11th season of the competition and the 67th season of recognised second-tier football in Portugal. As the LPFP took over all nationwide professional leagues the competition was renamed from Segunda Divisão de Honra to Segunda Liga.

== Overview ==
The league was contested by 18 teams with CD Santa Clara winning the championship and gaining promotion to the Primeira Liga along with Varzim SC and Vitória Setúbal. At the other end of the table Imortal DC, FC Marco and SC Freamunde were relegated to the Segunda Divisão.

== League standings ==
Pos	Team	Pld	W	D	L	GF	GA	GD	Pts	Promotion or relegation
1	Santa Clara (C, P)	34	20	7	7	60	37	+23	67	Promotion to Primeira Liga
2	Vitória de Setúbal (P)	34	19	7	8	64	41	+23	64	Promotion to Primeira Liga
3	Varzim (P)	34	19	7	8	53	34	+19	64	Promotion to Primeira Liga
4	Maia	34	19	7	8	58	41	+17	64	
5	Rio Ave	34	17	9	8	68	35	+33	60	
6	Penafiel	34	17	7	10	45	31	+14	58	
7	Nacional	34	14	9	11	55	52	+3	51	
8	Académica	34	14	6	14	51	48	+3	48	
9	Naval 1º Maio	34	14	6	14	49	45	+4	48	
10	União de Lamas	34	11	8	15	43	56	−13	41	
11	Ovarense	34	12	5	17	42	53	−11	41	
12	Chaves	34	9	14	11	48	44	+4	41	
13	Leça	34	11	6	17	34	57	−23	39	
14	Espinho	34	9	11	14	39	41	−2	38	
15	FC Felgueiras	34	8	10	16	40	50	−10	34	
16	Imortal (R)	34	7	12	15	33	44	−11	33	Relegation to Segunda Divisão B
17	Marco (R)	34	9	6	19	39	66	−27	33	Relegation to Segunda Divisão B
18	Freamunde (R)	34	6	5	23	28	64	−36	23	Relegation to Segunda Divisão B

(C) Champions; (P) Promoted; (R) Relegated
