= Ivo Damas =

Portuguese footballer

Personal information
- Full name: Ivo Filipe Cerqueira Damas
- Date of birth: 3 June 1977 (age 49)
- Place of birth: Penafiel, Portugal
- Height: 1.71 m (5 ft 7 in)
- Position: Attacking midfielder

Youth career
- 1988–1991: Penafiel
- 1992–1995: Paredes

Senior career*
| Years | Team | Apps | (Gls) |
| 1995–1997 | Paredes | | |
| 1997–1998 | Maia | 5 | (1) |
| 1998–2002 | Sporting CP | 8 | (0) |
| 1998–2000 | → Lourinhanense (loan) | 20 | (8) |
| 2000–2001 | → Alverca (loan) | 6 | (1) |
| 2001–2002 | → Ovarense (loan) | 8 | (0) |
| 2002–2003 | Penafiel | 12 | (0) |
| 2003–2005 | Dragões Sandinenses | 45 | (9) |
| 2005–2006 | Vitória Pico | | |
| 2006 | Madalena | 8 | (0) |
| 2007 | Lousada | 13 | (0) |
| 2007–2008 | Anadia | 16 | (1) |
| 2008 | Olympiakos Nicosia | 2 | (0) |
| 2009–2010 | Vila Meã | 0 | (0) |
| Total | | 143 | (20) |

International career
| 1997–1998 | Portugal U20 | 3 | (0) |
| 1997–1998 | Portugal U21 | 2 | (0) |
- * Club domestic league appearances and goals

Ivo Filipe Cerqueira Damas (born 3 June 1977) is a Portuguese former professional footballer who played as an attacking midfielder.

== Club career ==
Born in Penafiel, Damas' claim to fame came at the age of 20 when he scored three goals for lowly F.C. Maia in a 5–4 home loss against giants FC Porto in the Taça de Portugal. He was immediately bought by Sporting CP on an eight-year contract in January 1998, but his career would never improve from there; he made his debut in the Primeira Liga with F.C. Alverca, and also served a two-year loan at S.C. Lourinhanense, Sporting's farm team, appearing very rarely for the main squad.

From his 2002 release from Sporting onwards, Damas played in almost every level of the Portuguese football league system, for instance representing F.C. Penafiel and A.D. Lousada. For a short period of time, in 2008, he had an unassuming abroad experience with Cypriot club Olympiakos Nicosia, but returned the following year to his country, joining amateurs AC Vila Meã (fourth division).

== International career ==
Damas won caps for Portugal at under-20 and under-21 levels. He represented the former at the 1998 Toulon Tournament.
