= Leandro de Almeida =

Leandro de Almeida may refer to:

- Leandro Almeida Silva (footballer born 1977) Brazilian footballer
- Leandro Almeida Silva (footballer born 1987) Brazilian footballer
- Leandro Marcolini Pedroso de Almeida (1982) Brazilian-Hungarian footballer
