= José Manuel Chevela =

Portuguese footballer

Personal information
- Full name: José Manuel Chevela de Souza
- Date of birth: 3 April 1979 (age 47)
- Place of birth: Montijo, Portugal
- Height: 1.87 m (6 ft 2 in)
- Position: Forward

Youth career
- 1990–1993: Montijo
- 1993–1994: Alcochetense
- 1994–1997: Montijo

Senior career*
Years	Team	Apps	(Gls)
1997–1999	Montijo		
1999–2003	Barreirense	119	(8)
2003–2004	Ovarense	32	(3)
2004–2005	Aves	26	(3)
2005	Dragões Sandinenses	9	(1)
2006	Pinhalnovense	12	(1)
2006	APEP	15	(9)
2007	BV Cloppenburg	14	(3)
2007–2008	AEP		
2008	Olympiakos Nicosia	4	(2)
2009	Sanjoanense	9	(1)
2009–2010	Olímpico Montijo		
2010	Praiense	10	(0)
2011	Caála		
Total		250	(31)
- * Club domestic league appearances and goals

José Manuel Chevela de Souza (born 3 April 1979 in Montijo, Setúbal) is a Portuguese retired professional footballer who played as a forward.
