= 2001–02 Segunda Liga =

68th season of second-tier football league in Portugal

Segunda Liga
- Season: 2001–02
- Champions: Moreirense FC
- Promoted: Moreirense FC; Académica Coimbra; Nacional Funchal
- Relegated: SC Espinho; UD Oliveirense; SC Campomaiorense (abandoned professional football)

The 2001–02 Segunda Liga season was the 12th season of the competition and the 68th season of recognised second-tier football in Portugal.

== Overview ==
The league was contested by 18 teams with Moreirense FC winning the championship and gaining promotion to the Primeira Liga along with Académica Coimbra and Nacional Funchal. At the other end of the table SC Espinho and UD Oliveirense were relegated to the Segunda Divisão and SC Campomaiorense abandoned professional football.

== League standings ==
Pos	Team	Pld	W	D	L	GF	GA	GD	Pts	Promotion or relegation
1	Moreirense (C, P)	34	19	7	8	55	35	+20	64	Promotion to Primeira Liga
2	Académica (P)	34	17	11	6	60	49	+11	62	Promotion to Primeira Liga
3	Nacional (P)	34	18	8	8	62	39	+23	62	Promotion to Primeira Liga
4	Estrela da Amadora	34	16	9	9	44	38	+6	57	
5	Chaves	34	16	4	14	52	44	+8	52	
6	Portimonense	34	13	13	8	44	37	+7	52	
7	Desportivo das Aves	34	14	5	15	50	51	−1	47	
8	Rio Ave	34	12	10	12	45	36	+9	46	
9	Maia	34	12	10	12	50	43	+7	46	
10	Campomaiorense (R)	34	13	6	15	48	50	−2	45	Abandoned professional football
11	Leça	34	11	11	12	38	37	+1	44	
12	Naval 1º Maio	34	10	12	12	54	50	+4	42	
13	União de Lamas	34	11	8	15	33	47	−14	41	
14	Ovarense	34	10	10	14	42	52	−10	40	
15	Penafiel	34	9	11	14	27	38	−11	38	
16	Felgueiras	34	10	8	16	36	52	−16	38	
17	Espinho (R)	34	9	7	18	31	49	−18	34	Relegation to Segunda Divisão B
18	Oliveirense (R)	34	6	10	18	44	68	−24	28	Relegation to Segunda Divisão B

(C) Champions; (P) Promoted; (R) Relegated
