= Brandão (footballer, born 1970) =

Brazilian footballer

Personal information
- Full name: Idebrando Dalsoto
- Date of birth: 14 May 1970 (age 56)
- Place of birth: São Borja, Brazil
- Height: 1.80 m (5 ft 11 in)
- Position: Forward

Senior career*
Years	Team	Apps	(Gls)
1990–1994	Caxias		
1995	Coritiba		
1996	Caxias		
1997–1999	Coritiba		
1999	Os Belenenses	8	(7)
1999–2000	Vitória de Guimarães	32	(16)
2000	Coritiba		
2000–2003	Santa Clara	71	(30)
2004	Criciúma		
- * Club domestic league appearances and goals

Idebrando Dalsoto, known as Brandão (born 14 May 1970) is a Brazilian former professional footballer who played as a forward. In 2000, he was one of the leading scorers in the Portuguese Primeira Liga, while playing for Vitoria de Guimarães.

== Career ==
Brandão made his professional debut in the Segunda Liga for Os Belenenses on 3 April 1999 in a game against Felgueiras.

He made his Primeira Liga debut for Vitória de Guimarães on 20 August 1999 as a late substitute in a 1–1 draw against Vitória de Setúbal.

== Honours ==
Individual'

- 2000–01 Segunda Liga top scorer: 24 goals
