= 1994–95 Segunda Divisão de Honra =

61st season of second-tier football league in Portugal

Segunda Divisão de Honra
- Season: 1994–95
- Champions: Leça FC
- Promoted: Leça FC; SC Campomaiorense; SC Espinho
- Relegated: Portimonense SC; Amora FC; SCU Torreense

The 1994–95 Segunda Divisão de Honra season was the fifth season of the competition and the 61st season of recognised second-tier football in Portugal.

== Overview ==
The league was contested by 18 teams with Leça FC winning the championship and gaining promotion to the Primeira Liga along with SC Campomaiorense and FC Felgueiras. At the other end of the table Portimonense SC, Amora FC and SCU Torreense were relegated to the Segunda Divisão.

== League standings ==
Pos	Team	Pld	W	D	L	GF	GA	GD	Pts	Promotion or relegation
1	Leça (C, P)	34	20	6	8	52	29	+23	46	Promotion to Primeira Divisão
2	Campomaiorense (P)	34	19	8	7	58	27	+31	46	Promotion to Primeira Divisão
3	Felgueiras (P)	34	17	10	7	45	24	+21	44	Promotion to Primeira Divisão
4	Paços de Ferreira	34	17	8	9	45	28	+17	42	
5	Estoril	34	16	9	9	39	20	+19	41	
6	União de Lamas	34	14	8	12	36	43	−7	36	
7	Académica	34	13	9	12	41	39	+2	35	
8	Ovarense	34	13	9	12	37	41	−4	35	
9	Espinho	34	11	11	12	39	39	0	33	
10	Penafiel	34	13	6	15	41	46	−5	32	
11	Rio Ave	34	12	8	14	47	46	+1	32	
12	Famalicão	34	13	6	15	32	33	−1	32	
13	Nacional	34	11	10	13	39	42	−3	32	
14	Feirense	34	11	9	14	45	48	−3	31	
15	Desportivo das Aves	34	10	9	15	38	40	−2	29	
16	Portimonense (R)	34	11	6	17	35	48	−13	28	Relegation to Segunda Divisão B
17	Amora (R)	34	7	13	14	30	42	−12	27	Relegation to Segunda Divisão B
18	Torreense (R)	34	3	5	26	18	72	−54	11	Relegation to Segunda Divisão B

(C) Champions; (P) Promoted; (R) Relegated
