= 1995–96 Segunda Divisão de Honra =

62nd season of second-tier football league in Portugal

Segunda Divisão de Honra
- Season: 1995–96
- Champions: Rio Ave FC
- Promoted: Rio Ave FC; Vitória Setúbal; SC Espinho
- Relegated: Nacional Funchal; FC Famalicão; AD Ovarense

The 1995–96 Segunda Divisão de Honra season was the sixth season of the competition and the 62nd season of recognised second-tier football in Portugal.

== Overview ==
The league was contested by 18 teams with Rio Ave FC winning the championship and gaining promotion to the Primeira Liga along with Vitória Setúbal and SC Espinho. At the other end of the table Nacional Funchal, FC Famalicão and AD Ovarense were relegated to the Segunda Divisão.

== League standings ==
Pos	Team	Pld	W	D	L	GF	GA	GD	Pts	Promotion or relegation
1	Rio Ave (C, P)	34	21	5	8	58	42	+16	68	Promotion to Primeira Divisão
2	Vitória de Setúbal (P)	34	18	8	8	55	22	+33	62	Promotion to Primeira Divisão
3	Espinho (P)	34	19	5	10	49	27	+22	62	Promotion to Primeira Divisão
4	Desportivo das Aves	34	17	7	10	53	41	+12	58	
5	Paços de Ferreira	34	16	9	9	44	38	+6	57	
6	Penafiel	34	15	7	12	57	44	+13	52	
7	União da Madeira	34	14	9	11	43	37	+6	51	
8	Feirense	34	15	5	14	52	48	+4	50	
9	Académico de Viseu	34	13	10	11	29	28	+1	49	
10	Beira-Mar	34	13	8	13	39	37	+2	47	
11	Moreirense	34	12	9	13	39	41	−2	45	
12	Estoril	34	12	8	14	52	42	+10	44	
13	Alverca	34	12	8	14	28	38	−10	44	
14	União de Lamas	34	11	8	15	36	42	−6	41	
15	Académica	34	11	8	15	38	48	−10	41	
16	Nacional (R)	34	11	6	17	39	43	−4	39	Relegation to Segunda Divisão B
17	Famalicão (R)	34	8	4	22	27	57	−30	28	Relegation to Segunda Divisão B
18	Ovarense (R)	34	3	6	25	25	88	−63	15	Relegation to Segunda Divisão B

(C) Champions; (P) Promoted; (R) Relegated
