= Wilson (Angolan footballer) =

Angolan footballer

Personal information
- Full name: Wilson Constantino Novo Estrela
- Date of birth: 13 March 1969 (age 57)
- Place of birth: Moçâmedes, Angola
- Height: 1.78 m (5 ft 10 in)
- Position: Centre-back

Youth career
- 1983–1985: Alcobaça
- 1985–1987: Caldas

Senior career*
Years	Team	Apps	(Gls)
1987–1990	Caldas	54	(10)
1990–1991	Olhanense	26	(0)
1991–1992	O Elvas	31	(3)
1992–1994	Caldas	60	(4)
1994–1999	Gil Vicente	149	(3)
1999–2005	Belenenses	161	(1)
2005	Ovarense		
2006–2008	Alcobaça	73	(9)
Total		554	(30)

International career
1988–2001	Angola		
- * Club domestic league appearances and goals

Wilson Constantino Novo Estrela (born 13 March 1969), known simply as Wilson, is an Angolan former footballer who played as a central defender.

He also possessed Portuguese nationality, due to the many years spent in the country.

== Club career ==
Wilson was born in Moçâmedes, Portuguese Angola. In a career which spanned exactly two decades, always in Portugal, he represented Caldas SC (twice), S.C. Olhanense, O Elvas CAD, Gil Vicente F.C., C.F. Os Belenenses (having a lengthy Primeira Liga spell with both), A.D. Ovarense and G.C. Alcobaça, the latter in the fourth division.

Wilson retired in 2008, at the age of 39.

== International career ==
Wilson was an Angolan international for 13 years, appearing at the 1996 African Cup of Nations in South Africa. On 14 November 2001, he was one of four Angolan players sent off during a 5–1 friendly loss in Portugal; the game was abandoned after 70 minutes after the Africans were reduced to six men due to injury.
