= 2001–02 Segunda Divisão B =

Segunda Divisão
- Season: 2001–02
- Champions: SC Covilhã
- Promoted: SC Covilhã; FC Marco; União Funchal
- Relegated: 12 teams

The 2001–02 Segunda Divisão season was the 68th season of the competition and the 55th season of recognised third-tier football in Portugal.

== Overview ==
The league was contested by 60 teams in 3 divisions with SC Covilhã, FC Marco and União Funchal winning the respective divisional competitions and gaining promotion to the Liga de Honra. The overall championship was won by SC Covilhã.

== League standings ==
=== Segunda Divisão – Zona Norte ===
| Pos | Team | Pld | W | D | L | GF | GA | GD | Pts | Promotion or relegation |
|---|---|---|---|---|---|---|---|---|---|---|
| 1 | FC Marco | 38 | 25 | 8 | 5 | 64 | 38 | +26 | 83 | Promotion to Liga de Honra |
| 2 | Leixões SC | 38 | 25 | 8 | 5 | 73 | 27 | +46 | 83 | Qualification to UEFA Cup qualifying round (Note: Leixões qualified for the UEFA Cup as Portuguese Cup runners-up) |
| 3 | FC Porto B | 38 | 19 | 13 | 6 | 67 | 33 | +34 | 70 | |
| 4 | Ermesinde SC | 38 | 13 | 14 | 11 | 61 | 52 | +9 | 53 | |
| 5 | Gondomar SC | 38 | 13 | 14 | 11 | 60 | 58 | +2 | 53 | |
| 6 | Infesta FC | 38 | 14 | 10 | 14 | 67 | 62 | +5 | 52 | |
| 7 | União Paredes | 38 | 15 | 7 | 16 | 56 | 54 | +2 | 52 | |
| 8 | SC Braga B | 38 | 13 | 11 | 14 | 46 | 49 | −3 | 50 | |
| 9 | AD Esposende | 38 | 13 | 10 | 15 | 55 | 60 | −5 | 49 | |
| 10 | Vilanovense FC | 38 | 13 | 10 | 15 | 57 | 57 | 0 | 49 | |
| 11 | Canelas Gaia FC | 38 | 13 | 9 | 16 | 49 | 64 | −15 | 48 | |
| 12 | FC Vizela | 38 | 12 | 12 | 14 | 42 | 49 | −7 | 48 | |
| 13 | FC Pedras Rubras | 38 | 12 | 12 | 14 | 52 | 62 | −10 | 48 | |
| 14 | Caçadores das Taipas | 38 | 13 | 8 | 17 | 51 | 55 | −4 | 47 | |
| 15 | SC Freamunde | 38 | 11 | 13 | 14 | 44 | 48 | −4 | 46 | |
| 16 | SC Vila Real | 38 | 12 | 9 | 17 | 58 | 61 | −3 | 45 | |
| 17 | Os Sandinenses | 38 | 12 | 8 | 18 | 42 | 53 | −11 | 44 | Relegation to Terceira Divisão |
| 18 | GD Bragança | 38 | 11 | 9 | 18 | 48 | 58 | −10 | 42 | Relegation to Terceira Divisão |
| 19 | GD Joane | 38 | 10 | 9 | 19 | 35 | 63 | −28 | 39 | Relegation to Terceira Divisão |
| 20 | FC Famalicão | 38 | 8 | 12 | 18 | 51 | 75 | −24 | 36 | Relegation to Terceira Divisão |

=== Segunda Divisão – Zona Centro ===
| Pos | Team | Pld | W | D | L | GF | GA | GD | Pts | Promotion or relegation |
|---|---|---|---|---|---|---|---|---|---|---|
| 1 | SC Covilhã | 38 | 23 | 11 | 4 | 64 | 26 | +38 | 80 | Promotion to Liga de Honra |
| 2 | SC Pombal | 38 | 22 | 11 | 5 | 57 | 24 | +33 | 77 | |
| 3 | SCU Torreense | 38 | 21 | 8 | 9 | 65 | 38 | +27 | 71 | |
| 4 | Odivelas FC | 38 | 20 | 9 | 9 | 63 | 42 | +21 | 69 | |
| 5 | Académico Viseu | 38 | 18 | 13 | 7 | 65 | 44 | +21 | 67 | |
| 6 | AD Sanjoanense | 38 | 16 | 12 | 10 | 53 | 38 | +15 | 60 | |
| 7 | CD Feirense | 38 | 17 | 8 | 13 | 50 | 43 | +7 | 59 | |
| 8 | Oliveira do Bairro | 38 | 15 | 11 | 12 | 58 | 50 | +8 | 56 | |
| 9 | SC São João de Ver | 38 | 14 | 13 | 11 | 50 | 47 | +3 | 55 | |
| 10 | UD Vilafranquense | 38 | 14 | 12 | 12 | 53 | 41 | +12 | 54 | |
| 11 | Caldas SC | 38 | 14 | 10 | 14 | 62 | 65 | −3 | 52 | |
| 12 | CD Fátima | 38 | 13 | 8 | 17 | 47 | 62 | −15 | 47 | |
| 13 | Benfica Castelo Branco | 38 | 12 | 9 | 17 | 60 | 65 | −5 | 45 | |
| 14 | Oliveira do Hospital | 38 | 11 | 11 | 16 | 49 | 55 | −6 | 44 | |
| 15 | AC Marinhense | 38 | 11 | 9 | 18 | 46 | 64 | −18 | 42 | |
| 16 | União Coimbra | 38 | 10 | 9 | 19 | 42 | 65 | −23 | 39 | |
| 17 | GD Sourense | 38 | 10 | 8 | 20 | 43 | 74 | −31 | 38 | Relegation to Terceira Divisão |
| 18 | Beneditense CD | 38 | 11 | 3 | 24 | 47 | 67 | −20 | 36 | Relegation to Terceira Divisão |
| 19 | CD Arrifanense | 38 | 8 | 6 | 24 | 36 | 72 | −36 | 30 | Relegation to Terceira Divisão |
| 20 | CD Alcains | 38 | 6 | 7 | 25 | 39 | 67 | −28 | 25 | Relegation to Terceira Divisão |

=== Segunda Divisão – Zona Sul ===
| Pos | Team | Pld | W | D | L | GF | GA | GD | Pts | Promotion or relegation |
|---|---|---|---|---|---|---|---|---|---|---|
| 1 | União da Madeira | 38 | 24 | 9 | 5 | 69 | 24 | +45 | 81 | Promotion to Liga de Honra |
| 2 | Sporting CP B | 38 | 21 | 9 | 8 | 65 | 36 | +29 | 72 | |
| 3 | AD Camacha | 38 | 20 | 9 | 9 | 60 | 41 | +19 | 69 | |
| 4 | Seixal FC | 38 | 16 | 11 | 11 | 61 | 39 | +22 | 59 | |
| 5 | Estoril Praia | 38 | 17 | 8 | 13 | 47 | 44 | +3 | 59 | |
| 6 | Casa Pia AC | 38 | 15 | 8 | 15 | 48 | 49 | −1 | 53 | |
| 7 | FC Barreirense | 38 | 13 | 13 | 12 | 48 | 43 | +5 | 52 | |
| 8 | CD Olivais e Moscavide | 38 | 15 | 6 | 17 | 51 | 53 | −2 | 51 | |
| 9 | Louletano DC | 38 | 13 | 10 | 15 | 41 | 54 | −13 | 49 | |
| 10 | Imortal DC | 38 | 12 | 12 | 14 | 42 | 43 | −1 | 48 | |
| 11 | Amora FC | 38 | 12 | 12 | 14 | 51 | 53 | −2 | 48 | |
| 12 | SC Olhanense | 38 | 13 | 9 | 16 | 40 | 44 | −4 | 48 | |
| 13 | Marítimo Funchal B | 38 | 11 | 15 | 12 | 39 | 43 | −4 | 48 | |
| 14 | Operário Açores | 38 | 12 | 12 | 14 | 38 | 46 | −8 | 48 | |
| 15 | SC Lusitânia | 38 | 13 | 9 | 16 | 50 | 60 | −10 | 48 | |
| 16 | CSD Câmara de Lobos | 38 | 11 | 12 | 15 | 42 | 49 | −7 | 45 | |
| 17 | Atlético CP | 38 | 12 | 9 | 17 | 41 | 53 | −12 | 45 | Relegation to Terceira Divisão |
| 18 | Benfica B | 38 | 11 | 11 | 16 | 35 | 42 | −7 | 44 | Relegation to Terceira Divisão |
| 19 | AD Machico | 38 | 8 | 13 | 17 | 26 | 41 | −15 | 37 | Relegation to Terceira Divisão |
| 20 | Padernense Clube | 38 | 9 | 7 | 22 | 36 | 73 | −37 | 34 | Relegation to Terceira Divisão |
