= 1992–93 Segunda Divisão de Honra =

59th season of second-tier football league in Portugal

Segunda Divisão de Honra
- Season: 1992–93
- Champions: Estrela Amadora
- Promoted: Estrela Amadora; União Funchal; Vitória Setúbal
- Relegated: CD Feirense; Amora FC; Benfica Castelo Branco

The 1992–93 Segunda Divisão de Honra season was the third season of the competition and the 59th season of recognised second-tier football in Portugal.

== Overview ==
The league was contested by 18 teams with Estrela Amadora winning the championship and gaining promotion to the Primeira Divisão along with União Funchal and Vitória Setúbal. At the other end of the table CD Feirense, Amora FC and Benfica Castelo Branco were relegated to the Segunda Divisão.

== League standings ==
Pos	Team	Pld	W	D	L	GF	GA	GD	Pts	Promotion or relegation
1	Estrela da Amadora (C, P)	34	17	14	3	59	28	+31	48	Promotion to Primeira Divisão
2	União da Madeira (P)	34	18	11	5	60	34	+26	47	Promotion to Primeira Divisão
3	Vitória de Setúbal (P)	34	17	13	4	69	30	+39	47	Promotion to Primeira Divisão
4	Académica	34	19	7	8	56	39	+17	45	
5	Rio Ave	34	14	10	10	39	36	+3	38	
6	Ovarense	34	11	14	9	42	37	+5	36	
7	Torreense	34	14	7	13	53	44	+9	35	
8	União de Leiria	34	13	8	13	36	37	−1	34	
9	Desportivo das Aves	34	10	13	11	43	44	−1	33	
10	Felgueiras	34	10	12	12	30	35	−5	32	
11	Louletano	34	11	9	14	32	45	−13	31	
12	Leixões	34	11	9	14	34	39	−5	31	
13	Nacional	34	10	10	14	32	42	−10	30	
14	Penafiel	34	12	6	16	35	48	−13	30	
15	Campomaiorense	34	10	5	19	40	53	−13	25	
16	Feirense (R)	34	7	11	16	32	44	−12	25	Relegation to Segunda Divisão B
17	Amora (R)	34	7	10	17	27	53	−26	24	Relegation to Segunda Divisão B
18	Benfica Castelo Branco (R)	34	7	7	20	27	58	−31	21	Relegation to Segunda Divisão B

(C) Champions; (P) Promoted; (R) Relegated
