= Edu Souza =

Brazilian footballer (born 1981)

Personal information
- Full name: Eduardo Godinho Felipe de Souza
- Date of birth: 8 March 1981 (age 45)
- Place of birth: São Paulo, Brazil
- Height: 1.85 m (6 ft 1 in)
- Position: Striker

Senior career*
Years	Team	Apps	(Gls)
2003–2004	Barueri		
2005	Ovarense	28	(4)
2005–2007	Nelas	41	(18)
2007–2009	Trofense	40	(5)
2010–2011	Arouca	27	(2)
2011–2012	Chaves	12	(1)
2012	Espinho	12	(1)
Total		160	(31)
- * Club domestic league appearances and goals

Eduardo Godinho Felipe de Souza (born 8 March 1981), known as Edu Souza, is a Brazilian retired footballer who played as a striker.

== Club career ==
Born in São Paulo, Souza spent the vast majority of his professional career in Portugal, amassing Primeira Liga totals of 15 games and one goal for C.D. Trofense in the 2008–09 season.
