= Svetislav Perduv =

Bosnia-Herzegovinian footballer (born 1959)

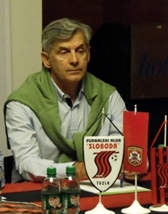

Personal information
- Date of birth: 8 March 1959 (age 67)
- Place of birth: Zenica, SFR Yugoslavia
- Position: Defender

Senior career*
Years	Team	Apps	(Gls)
1976–1980	Čelik Zenica	83	(4)
1980–1982	Olimpija		
1982–1986	Čelik Zenica	103	(7)
1986-1988	Chaumont	59	(5)
1988–1989	Fafe	25	(0)
1989–1990	União Madeira	23	(0)
1990–1991	Académico Viseu	33	(0)
1991–1992	Académica Coimbra	29	(3)
1992–1993	Ovarense	33	(2)

Managerial career
- 2014–2015: Sloboda Tuzla (asst.)
- * Club domestic league appearances and goals

Svetislav Perduv (born 8 March 1959) is a Bosnia-Herzegovinian former football player and manager who played as a defender.

== Playing career ==
Born in Zenica, Bosnia and Herzegovina, Socialist Federal Republic of Yugoslavia, Perduv played club football for NK Olimpija Ljubljana and NK Čelik Zenica in the Yugoslav First League. After that he moved to France and represent FC Chaumont in Division 3. At age 29, he moved to Portugal where he remained until his retirement, appearing for A.D. Fafe, Vitória de Guimarães, and C.F. União in the top division, and Académico de Viseu, Académica de Coimbra and A.D. Ovarense.

== Managerial career ==
In 1995, Perduv started his coaching and football manager career. He is also an official Fifa agent. He was named assistant to manager Alfredo Casimiro at Sloboda Tuzla in October 2014.
