= 1999–2000 Segunda Divisão B =

Season of football in Portugal

Segunda Divisão
- Season: 1999–2000
- Champions: FC Marco
- Promoted: AD Ovarense; FC Marco; Nacional Funchal
- Relegated: 12 teams

The 1999–2000 Segunda Divisão season was the 66th season of the competition and the 53rd season of recognised third-tier football in Portugal.

== Overview ==
The league was contested by 58 teams in 3 divisions with AD Ovarense, FC Marco and Nacional Funchal winning the respective divisional competitions and gaining promotion to the Liga de Honra. The overall championship was won by FC Marco.

== League standings ==
=== Segunda Divisão – Zona Norte ===
Pos	Team	Pld	W	D	L	GF	GA	GD	Pts	Promotion or relegation
1	FC Marco	34	21	6	7	71	42	+29	69	Promotion to Liga de Honra
2	FC Famalicão	34	18	6	10	60	48	+12	60	
3	FC Porto B	34	14	10	10	53	43	+10	52	
4	Leixões SC	34	14	8	12	52	46	+6	50	
5	Infesta FC	34	11	15	8	67	52	+15	48	
6	FC Vizela	34	13	9	12	33	46	−13	48	
7	Canelas Gaia FC	34	12	11	11	41	41	0	47	
8	AD Fafe	34	10	16	8	44	41	+3	46	
9	Ermesinde SC	34	11	11	12	38	34	+4	44	
10	CD Trofense	34	12	8	14	47	53	−6	44	
11	Os Sandinenses	34	10	13	11	38	38	0	43	
12	SC Braga B	34	11	10	13	40	47	−7	43	
13	Lusitânia Lourosa	34	12	6	16	36	47	−11	42	
14	Vilanovense FC	34	10	12	12	37	41	−4	42	
15	Lixa FC	34	11	8	15	37	45	−8	41	
16	Caçadores das Taipas	34	8	15	11	51	58	−7	39	
17	GD Joane	34	10	7	17	46	52	−6	37	Relegation to Terceira Divisão
18	SC Vianense	34	7	11	16	26	43	−17	32	Relegation to Terceira Divisão

=== Segunda Divisão – Zona Centro ===
Pos	Team	Pld	W	D	L	GF	GA	GD	Pts	Promotion or relegation
1	AD Ovarense	38	22	12	4	77	37	+40	78	Promotion to Liga de Honra
2	UD Vilafranquense	38	18	11	9	78	51	+27	65	
3	Oliveira do Bairro SC	38	18	10	10	56	45	+11	64	
4	AD Sanjoanense	38	18	7	13	56	34	+22	61	
5	CD Feirense	38	16	13	9	54	35	+19	61	
6	SC Pombal	38	16	12	10	56	43	+13	60	
7	Académico Viseu	38	16	10	12	45	35	+10	58	
8	UD Oliveirense	38	18	3	17	54	48	+6	57	
9	SC Lourinhanense	38	16	8	14	59	48	+11	56	
10	CD Arrifanense	38	15	10	13	50	47	+3	55	
11	CD Torres Novas	38	13	14	11	39	41	−2	53	
12	AC Marinhense	38	13	9	16	54	65	−11	48	
13	Caldas SC	38	13	9	16	47	55	−8	48	
14	AC Cucujães	38	12	10	16	40	62	−22	46	
15	SCU Torreense	38	11	12	15	49	44	+5	45	
16	RD Águeda	38	10	10	18	36	46	−10	40	
17	Beneditense CD	38	8	15	15	40	43	−3	39	Relegation to Terceira Divisão
18	Águias Camarate	38	9	11	18	44	68	−24	38	Relegation to Terceira Divisão
19	GD Peniche	38	10	7	21	42	79	−37	37	Relegation to Terceira Divisão
20	AD Guarda	38	8	7	23	26	76	−50	31	Relegation to Terceira Divisão

=== Segunda Divisão – Zona Sul ===
Pos	Team	Pld	W	D	L	GF	GA	GD	Pts	Promotion or relegation
1	CD Nacional	38	25	8	5	66	32	+34	83	Promotion to Liga de Honra
2	Portimonense SC	38	21	10	7	80	40	+40	73	
3	União da Madeira	38	21	9	8	65	37	+28	72	
4	GD Estoril Praia	38	18	13	7	67	40	+27	67	
5	FC Barreirense	38	19	9	10	56	34	+22	66	
6	SC Olhanense	38	17	13	8	57	34	+23	64	
7	AD Machico	38	17	12	9	51	46	+5	63	
8	CSD Câmara de Lobos	38	16	11	11	50	44	+6	59	
9	Marítimo B	38	15	13	10	50	40	+10	58	
10	Oriental Lisboa	38	15	11	12	44	43	+1	56	
11	Operário Açores	38	16	4	18	52	47	+5	52	
12	GD Sesimbra	38	15	4	19	57	53	+4	49	
13	S.L. Benfica B	38	14	6	18	53	49	+4	48	
14	Louletano DC	38	12	8	18	40	47	−7	44	
15	AD Camacha	38	9	15	14	41	56	−15	42	
16	SC Lusitânia	38	12	5	21	45	59	−14	41	
17	CD Ribeira Brava	38	9	10	19	45	60	−15	37	Relegation to Terceira Divisão
18	GD Alcochetense	38	9	8	21	39	72	−33	35	Relegation to Terceira Divisão
19	Amora FC	38	5	8	25	45	101	−56	23	Relegation to Terceira Divisão
20	Juventude Évora	38	4	5	29	28	97	−69	17	Relegation to Terceira Divisão
