= 2004–05 Segunda Liga =

71st season of second-tier football league in Portugal

Segunda Liga
- Season: 2004–05
- Champions: FC Paços de Ferreira
- Promoted: FC Paços de Ferreira; Naval 1º Maio; Estrela Amadora
- Relegated: SC Espinho; FC Felgueiras; FC Alverca (abandoned professional football)

The 2004–05 Segunda Liga season was the 15th season of the competition and the 71st season of recognised second-tier football in Portugal.

== Overview ==
The league was contested by 18 teams with FC Paços de Ferreira winning the championship and gaining promotion to the Primeira Liga along with Naval 1º Maio and Estrela Amadora. At the other end of the table SC Espinho were relegated to the Segunda Divisão along with FC Felgueiras who were relegated for financial reasons. Finally 13th placed FC Alverca gave up professional football.

== League standings ==
Pos	Team	Pld	W	D	L	GF	GA	GD	Pts	Promotion or relegation
1	Paços de Ferreira (C, P)	34	20	9	5	60	43	+17	69	Promotion to Primeira Liga
2	Naval 1º Maio (P)	34	17	11	6	52	30	+22	62	Promotion to Primeira Liga
3	Estrela da Amadora (P)	34	17	9	8	47	30	+17	60	Promotion to Primeira Liga
4	Marco	34	13	12	9	51	43	+8	51	
5	Desportivo das Aves	34	15	6	13	45	35	+10	51	
6	Leixões	34	14	8	12	40	33	+7	50	
7	Feirense	34	14	7	13	45	48	−3	49	
8	Maia	34	13	10	11	46	36	+10	49	
9	Olhanense	34	11	11	12	32	31	+1	44	
10	Varzim	34	11	10	13	37	42	−5	43	
11	Felgueiras (R)	34	11	9	14	37	44	−7	42	Relegation to Segunda Divisão
12	Ovarense	34	11	8	15	40	51	−11	41	
13	Alverca (R)	34	11	6	17	26	38	−12	39	Abandoned professional football
14	Portimonense	34	10	9	15	40	49	−9	39	
15	Santa Clara	34	11	6	17	39	49	−10	39	
16	Gondomar	34	11	6	17	36	43	−7	39	
17	Chaves	34	9	10	15	24	38	−14	37	
18	Espinho (R)	34	9	9	16	37	51	−14	36	Relegation to Segunda Divisão

(C) Champions; (P) Promoted; (R) Relegated
