= 2002–03 Segunda Liga =

69th season of second-tier football league in Portugal

Segunda Liga
- Season: 2002–03
- Champions: Rio Ave FC
- Promoted: Rio Ave FC; FC Alverca; Estrela Amadora
- Relegated: Leça FC; União Lamas; SC Farense

The 2002–03 Segunda Liga season was the 13th season of the competition and the 69th season of recognised second-tier football in Portugal.

== Overview ==
The league was contested by 18 teams with Rio Ave FC winning the championship and gaining promotion to the Primeira Liga along with FC Alverca and Estrela Amadora. At the other end of the table Leça FC and União Lamas were relegated to the Segunda Divisão along with SC Farense who were relegated for financial reasons.

== League standings ==
Pos	Team	Pld	W	D	L	GF	GA	GD	Pts	Promotion or relegation
1	Rio Ave (C, P)	34	19	6	9	49	36	+13	63	Promotion to Primeira Liga
2	Alverca (P)	34	16	12	6	47	24	+23	60	Promotion to Primeira Liga
3	Estrela da Amadora (P)	34	15	12	7	42	32	+10	57	Promotion to Primeira Liga
4	Naval 1º Maio	34	13	16	5	40	25	+15	55	
5	Portimonense	34	14	9	11	50	40	+10	51	
6	Desportivo das Aves	34	13	8	13	41	38	+3	47	
7	Chaves	34	12	11	11	44	41	+3	47	
8	Salgueiros	34	12	10	12	39	47	−8	46	
9	Ovarense	34	13	7	14	49	48	+1	46	
10	Maia	34	12	10	12	51	51	0	46	
11	Sporting da Covilhã	34	11	12	11	37	33	+4	45	
12	Farense (R)	34	11	11	12	32	32	0	44	Relegation to Segunda Divisão B
13	Marco	34	11	10	13	46	49	−3	43	
14	Penafiel	34	12	5	17	38	40	−2	41	
15	União da Madeira	34	10	10	14	31	38	−7	40	
16	Felgueiras	34	10	9	15	34	50	−16	39	
17	Leça (R)	34	8	15	11	35	42	−7	39	Relegation to Segunda Divisão B
18	União de Lamas (R)	34	4	7	23	21	60	−39	19	Relegation to Segunda Divisão B

(C) Champions; (P) Promoted; (R) Relegated
