= Estádio Marques da Silva =

Multi-use stadium in Ovar, Aveiro, Portugal

Coordinates: 40°41′53.59″N 8°37′34.26″W

- Interactive map of Estádio Marques da Silva
- Full name: Estádio Marques da Silva
- Location: Ovar, Aveiro, Portugal
- Owner: A.D. Ovarense
- Capacity: 3,200
- Surface: Grass
- Field size: 104 x 67 m

Construction
- Built: 1954
- Opened: 1954

Tenant
- A.D. Ovarense

Estádio Marques da Silva is a multi-use stadium in Ovar, Aveiro, Portugal. It is currently used mostly for football matches and is the home stadium of A.D. Ovarense. It is also the home to Ovarense's U19s, U17s, U15s and B teams. The stadium was built in 1954 and is able to hold a seating capacity of 3,200 people.
