= F.C. Famalicão =

Association football club

Famalicão
- Full name: Futebol Clube de Famalicão
- Nicknames: Famalicenses; Vila Nova; Azuis e Brancos; Fama
- Short name: FCF
- Founded: 21 August 1931; 95 years ago
- Stadium: Estádio Municipal 22 de Junho
- Capacity: 5,186
- Owner: Quantum Pacific Group
- President: Miguel Ribeiro
- Head coach: Ricardo (caretaker)
- League: Primeira Liga
- 2025–26: Primeira Liga, 5th of 18
- Website: www.fcfamalicao.pt
| Home colours | Away colours | Third colours |

Futebol Clube de Famalicão, commonly known as Famalicão, is a Portuguese professional football club from Vila Nova de Famalicão. Founded on 21 August 1931, its senior team currently plays in the Primeira Liga, the top tier of Portuguese football.

Since 1952, Famalicão have played their home matches at the Estádio Municipal 22 de Junho, which holds a 5,186-seat capacity. The Famalicenses' most successful period of their history occurred in the early 1990s, where the club played four seasons in the Primeira Liga, between 1990 and 1994, counting now with seven Primeira Liga appearances. The club is owned by Quantum Pacific Group which also has 30% share of Atlético de Madrid.

== History ==
Futebol Clube de Famalicão was founded on the 21 August 1931 by six friends. Their first match was the opening of their ground, the Campo da Berberia, with a match against FC Porto in 1932. Their first kit was green and white, however, they eventually changed it to blue and white in order to get affiliation from Porto. Famalicão started competing in 1932–33 in the Regional Promotion Championship which they won. In 1945–46, the club reached the semi-finals of the Taça de Portugal under Hungarian manager Janos Szabo, but were beaten 11–0 by a Sporting CP team led by Cândido de Oliveira.

The club have spent six years in the Primeira Liga in total - 1946–47, 1978–79, and four consecutively from 1990 to 1994. The 2000s brought a fast fall with the club dropping as far as the regional championships. Having fallen as low as the fifth-tier Braga Football Association district league in 2008–09, Famalicão returned to Segunda Liga for the first time in 19 years in May 2015 by winning their group in the Campeonato Nacional de Seniores. Even in that years, the club archived records from his supporters attendance, playing home or away. They lost the final on penalties to C.D. Mafra after a 1–1 draw at the Estádio Municipal da Marinha Grande on 10 June.

At the beginning of the 2018–19 season, 51% of the club share was bought by Quantum Pacific Group, a group led by Israeli businessman Idan Ofer that also holds 33% of Atlético de Madrid. On 28 April 2019, the club won promotion to the top flight for the first time in a quarter of a century.

On 11 September 2019, Quantum Pacific Group increased its share in the Sociedade Anónima Desportiva of the club from 51% to 85%, spearheaded by Israeli billionaire Idan Ofer. With a 1–0 win over F.C. Paços de Ferreira in January 2020, the club reached the semi-finals of the cup for the first time since 1946.

The club plays their home games at Estádio Municipal de Famalicão and have occupied the stadium since its opening in 1952. The club's previous grounds were Campo da Berberia, opened in 1932, and Campo do Freião, opened in 1946. Works on the stadium were planned for 2019 to increase the comfort and technology of the stadium, as well as expanding its capacity to 10,000.

== Players ==
=== Current squad ===
As of 10 September 2026

Note: Flags indicate national team as defined under FIFA eligibility rules; some limited exceptions apply. Players may hold more than one non-FIFA nationality.

| No. | Pos. | Nation | Player |
|---|---|---|---|
| 1 | GK | RUS | Ivan Zlobin (captain) |
| 2 | DF | BRA | Gustavo Garcia |
| 3 | DF | ECU | Leo Realpe |
| 4 | DF | NED | Finn van Breemen |
| 5 | DF | SUI | Leny Meyer |
| 6 | MF | NED | Tom van de Looi (3rd captain) |
| 7 | FW | BRA | Sorriso |
| 8 | MF | ESP | Marcos Peña |
| 9 | FW | NGR | Umar Abubakar |
| 10 | MF | POR | Pedro Santos |
| 11 | FW | ESP | Óscar Aranda |
| 14 | MF | POR | Mathias De Amorim |
| 15 | DF | GBS | Víctor Rofino |

| No. | Pos. | Nation | Player |
|---|---|---|---|
| 17 | DF | POR | Rodrigo Pinheiro (4th captain) |
| 18 | FW | SUI | Roméo Beney |
| 19 | MF | POR | Paulo Moreira |
| 21 | MF | HUN | Tamás Szűcs |
| 22 | GK | BRA | Gabriel Cabral |
| 23 | FW | POR | Gil Dias (vice-captain) |
| 24 | MF | FRA | Mathis Jangéal |
| 25 | GK | MNE | Lazar Carević |
| 28 | DF | ANG | Pedro Bondo |
| 30 | DF | SRB | Vojin Serafimović |
| 33 | FW | MEX | Patricio Salas (on loan from América) |
| 36 | DF | BRA | Matheus Mattara |
| 70 | FW | GRE | Georgios Koutsias |

=== Out on loan ===
Note: Flags indicate national team as defined under FIFA eligibility rules; some limited exceptions apply. Players may hold more than one non-FIFA nationality.

| No. | Pos. | Nation | Player |
|---|---|---|---|
| — | DF | BRA | Riccieli (at Vitória until 31 December 2026) |
| — | MF | GEO | Otar Mamageishvili (at Wolfsberger until 30 June 2027) |

| No. | Pos. | Nation | Player |
|---|---|---|---|
| — | MF | ESP | Gonzalo Pastor (at Unionistas until 30 June 2027) |
| — | FW | POR | Rúdi Almeida (at Amarante until 30 June 2027) |

== Competitions ==
=== Trophies ===
National
| Competition | Titles | Seasons |
|---|---|---|
| Segunda Divisão | 2 | 1977–78, 1987–88 |
Regional
| Competition | Titles | Seasons |
| Regional Promotion Championship | 1 | 1935–36 |
| Regional Opening Tournament | 3 | 1982–83, 1984–85, 1986–87 |
| Regional Honour Cup | 1 | 1986–87 |
| Primeira Divisão Regional | 2 | 1954–55, 1961–62 |

=== Participations ===
National
| Competition | Participations | Best finish |
|---|---|---|
| Primeira Liga | 11 | 5th |
| Liga Portugal 2 | 6 | 2nd |
| Segunda Divisão | 42 | 1st |
| Terceira Divisão | 9 | 2nd |
| Portuguese Cup | 60 | Semi-finals |
| Portuguese League Cup | 4 | Group stage |
Regional
| Competition | Participations | Best finish |
| Honour Division | 1 | 2nd |

=== Season by season ===
| Season | Tier | Competition | Classification | Portuguese Cup |
|---|---|---|---|---|
| 1989–90 | 2 | Segunda Divisão | 2nd | 1/32 |
| 1990–91 | 1 | Primeira Divisão | 15th | 1/8 |
| 1991–92 | 1 | Primeira Divisão | 14th | 1/8 |
| 1992–93 | 1 | Primeira Divisão | 14th | 4QR |
| 1993–94 | 1 | Primeira Divisão | 17th | 1/8 |
| 1994–95 | 2 | Segunda Divisão | 12th | 1/8 |
| 1995–96 | 2 | Segunda Divisão | 17th | 3QR |
| 1996–97 | 3 | Segunda Divisão B | 3rd | 2QR |
| 1997–98 | 3 | Segunda Divisão B | 10th | 2QR |
| 1998–99 | 3 | Segunda Divisão B | 10th | 4QR |
| 1999–2000 | 3 | Segunda Divisão B | 2nd | 4QR |
| 2000–01 | 3 | Segunda Divisão B | 2nd | 1/4 |
| 2001–02 | 3 | Segunda Divisão B | 20th | 2QR |
| 2002–03 | 4 | Terceira Divisão | 6th | 1QR |
| 2003–04 | 4 | Terceira Divisão | 10th | 3QR |
| 2004–05 | 4 | Terceira Divisão | 2nd | 3QR |
| 2005–06 | 3 | Segunda Divisão B | 7th | 2QR |
| 2006–07 | 3 | Segunda Divisão B | 12th | 4QR |
| 2007–08 | 4 | Terceira Divisão | 13th | 1QR |
| 2008–09 | 5 | Regional Honour League | 2nd | - |
| 2009–10 | 4 | Terceira Divisão | 3rd | 1QR |
| 2010–11 | 4 | Terceira Divisão | 2nd | 1QR |
| 2011–12 | 3 | Segunda Divisão B | 7th | 3QR |
| 2012–13 | 3 | Segunda Divisão B | 9th | 1QR |
| 2013–14 | 3 | Campeonato Nacional de Seniores | 8th | 4QR |
| 2014–15 | 3 | Campeonato Nacional de Seniores | 2nd | QF |
| 2015–16 | 2 | LigaPro | 6th | 3QR |
| 2016–17 | 2 | LigaPro | 15th | 3QR |
| 2017–18 | 2 | LigaPro | 14th | 4QR |
| 2018–19 | 2 | LigaPro | 2nd | 2QR |
| 2019–20 | 1 | Primeira Liga | 6th | SF |
| 2020–21 | 1 | Primeira Liga | 9th | 4QR |
| 2021–22 | 1 | Primeira Liga | 8th | 1/8 |
| 2022–23 | 1 | Primeira Liga | 8th | SF |
| 2023–24 | 1 | Primeira Liga | 8th | 4QR |
| 2024–25 | 1 | Primeira Liga | 7th | 4QR |
| 2025–26 | 1 | Primeira Liga | 5th | 5QR |

Promotion stage

Relegation stage CNS

== Crest ==
Crest evolution
| 1931–1965 | 1965–1988 | 1988–2011 | 2011–2018 | 2018–present |
