= 2003–04 Segunda Liga =

70th season of second-tier football league in Portugal

Segunda Liga
- Season: 2003–04
- Champions: GD Estoril Praia
- Promoted: GD Estoril Praia; Vitória Setúbal; FC Penafiel
- Relegated: SC Covilhã; União Funchal; SC Salgueiros

The 2003–04 Segunda Liga season was the 14th season of the competition and the 70th season of recognised second-tier football in Portugal.

== Overview ==
The league was contested by 18 teams with GD Estoril Praia winning the championship and gaining promotion to the Primeira Liga along with Vitória Setúbal and FC Penafiel. At the other end of the table SC Covilhã and União Funchal were relegated to the Segunda Divisão along with SC Salgueiros who were relegated for financial reasons.

== League standings ==
Pos	Team	Pld	W	D	L	GF	GA	GD	Pts	Promotion or relegation
1	Estoril (C, P)	34	20	7	7	63	40	+23	67	Promotion to Primeira Liga
2	Vitória de Setúbal (P)	34	18	10	6	66	41	+25	64	Promotion to Primeira Liga
3	Penafiel (P)	34	17	10	7	54	35	+19	61	Promotion to Primeira Liga
4	Varzim	34	16	10	8	44	36	+8	58	
5	Maia	34	15	6	13	52	56	−4	51	
6	Salgueiros (R)	34	13	8	13	47	46	+1	47	Relegation to Segunda Divisão B
7	Naval 1º Maio	34	12	10	12	46	42	+4	46	
8	Desportivo das Aves	34	13	6	15	42	53	−11	45	
9	Ovarense	34	11	11	12	51	54	−3	44	
10	Chaves	34	11	11	12	37	45	−8	44	
11	Felgueiras	34	12	6	16	39	42	−3	42	
12	Feirense	34	10	12	12	47	46	+1	42	
13	Santa Clara	34	11	9	14	41	44	−3	42	
14	Leixões	34	9	15	10	44	48	−4	42	
15	Marco	34	11	8	15	41	53	−12	41	
16	Portimonense	34	8	15	11	36	39	−3	39	
17	Sporting da Covilhã (R)	34	8	5	21	39	55	−16	29	Relegation to Segunda Divisão B
18	União da Madeira (R)	34	4	15	15	39	53	−14	27	Relegation to Segunda Divisão B

(C) Champions; (P) Promoted; (R) Relegated
