= S.C. Braga B =

Portuguese association football reserve team

Braga B
- Full name: Sporting Clube de Braga B
- Nicknames: Os Arcebispos (The Archbishops); Os Arsenalistas (The Arsenalists); Os Guerreiros do Minho (The Minho Warriors)
- Short name: Braga B
- Founded: 1999–2006, 2012–
- Ground: Estádio Amélia Morais
- Capacity: 2,500
- President: António Salvador
- Manager: Simão Freitas
- League: Liga 3
- 2025–26: Liga 3 Serie A, 5th (First stage); Relegation series, 1st (Second stage)
- Website: www.scbraga.pt
Home colours	Away colours

Sporting Clube de Braga B, commonly known as Sporting de Braga B or just Braga B, is a Portuguese football team. It is the reserve team of S.C. Braga. Reserve teams in Portugal play in the same league system as the senior team, rather than in a reserve team league. However, they cannot play in the same division as their senior team, therefore Braga B is ineligible for promotion to the Primeira Liga and also cannot play in the Taça de Portugal and Taça da Liga.

SC Braga had a B team until the 2005–06 season where it played in the Portuguese Second Division. Prior to the end of the 2005–06 season, it was announced that Braga B would fold from the Portuguese league system along with the B teams of Benfica, Porto and Sporting. The club refounded itself in the 2012–13 season, when a new set of rules regarding B teams was introduced in Portuguese football system. For 2012–13 season, another five B Teams, alongside Braga B, where refounded and established themselves in Segunda Liga.

SC Braga B plays its home games at the new 2,500-capacity Estádio Amélia Morais, which opened in 2025. This change resulted in the abandonment of the old and outdated Estádio Primeiro de Maio, where it had played until then, after inheriting it from the main team, which abandoned it in 2003 following the construction of the Estádio Municipal de Braga.

== History ==
=== Revival ===
Prior to the end of the 2011–12 football season in Portugal, seven clubs in the Primeira Liga announced there interest in constructing a B team to fill the six vacant places available to compete in the Segunda Liga for the 2012–13 season. Of those seven, the six clubs which were selected to take part in the competition were the B teams of Benfica, Porto, Sporting CP, Braga, Marítimo and Vitória de Guimarães, for being the best ranked in the 2011-12 Primeira Liga.

The Portuguese League for Professional Football (LPFP), which organizes the professional football tiers in Portugal, announced that for the clubs to compete in the 2012–13 Segunda Liga, they would have to pay a €50,000 fee. In addition, the LPFP would also require the clubs to follow new rules regarding player selection in which each 'B' team must have a squad of a minimum of ten players who were developed at the club's academy. The LPFP also went on to say that the clubs are unable to compete in cup competitions as well as gaining promotion due to the possibility of playing the senior team. Each 'B' team may have three players above 23 years old.

In late May 2012, it was officially announced that the six Primeira Liga clubs' B teams would compete in the 2012–13 Segunda Liga which would increase the number of teams in the league from 16 to 22 as well as increasing the number of games needed to play in one season from 30 games to 42 games.

== Players ==
=== Current squad ===
As of 1 March 2026

Note: Flags indicate national team as defined under FIFA eligibility rules; some limited exceptions apply. Players may hold more than one non-FIFA nationality.

No.	Pos.	Nation	Player
40	DF	BRA	João Matos
42	DF	POR	Yanis da Rocha
44	MF	POR	Dinis Gama
47	DF	POR	Matheus Araújo
53	DF	POR	Jonatás Noro
54	MF	POR	Gui Barbosa
58	FW	GNB	Flinto Costa
59	FW	POR	Yan Said
60	MF	POR	João Lomba
61	MF	POR	Tiago Ferreira
62	DF	POR	Nuno Matos
63	DF	POR	Rodrigo Beirão
66	GK	POR	Gonçalo Dias
70	FW	POR	Mordomo
71	MF	SEN	Mamadou Diop

No.	Pos.	Nation	Player
72	FW	POR	João Aragão
76	DF	POR	Tomás Marques
78	GK	POR	João Carvalho
79	FW	POR	Rúben Furtado
80	MF	POR	João Vasconcelos
81	DF	GNB	Fodé Pascoal
82	DF	BRA	Gui Costa
85	MF	GNB	Edgar Nanque
89	FW	POR	Afonso Duarte
90	MF	POR	Luisinho
92	MF	POR	António Gil
95	FW	POR	Sandro Vidigal
96	DF	POR	Afonso Sousa
99	FW	BRA	Kauan Kelvin

== Results history ==
Season	II	2ª B	LI	Pts	G	W	D	L	GF	GA	+/-
2014/15	21			49	46	12	15	19	48	62	−14
2013/14	20			44	42	12	8	22	47	60	−13
2012/13	16			47	42	12	13	17	39	51	−12
2009/10			11	20	14	6	1	7	25	31	−6
2007/08			2	-	20	9	3	8	32	29	+3
2005/06		9		34	26	9	7	10	24	23	−1
2004/05		7		62	38	18	8	12	68	48	+20
2003/04		6		52	36	15	7	14	49	48	+1
2002/03		6		57	38	16	9	13	57	41	+16
2001/02		8		51	38	13	12	13	46	46	0
2000/01		7		54	38	14	12	12	45	48	−3
1999/00		11		43	34	11	10	13	40	46	−6
II – II Liga; 2ª B – 2nd Division B/Campeonato Nacional; LI – Liga Intercalar;

== Notable former players ==
- (Portugal) Eduardo
- (Portugal) Emídio Rafael
- (Portugal) Hélder Sousa
- (Portugal) Jorge Humberto
- (Portugal) Luisinho
- (Portugal) Marco Silva
- (Portugal) Nuno Fonseca
- (Portugal) Paulo Jorge
- (Portugal) Pedro Queirós
- (Portugal) Ricardo Rocha
- (Portugal) Zé Gomes
- (Australia) Michael Curcija
- (Brazil) William Soares
- (Brazil) Manoel Lemes
- (Burkina Faso) Narcisse Yameogo
- (Canada) Jon Paul
- (Cape Verde) Puma
- (Cape Verde) Zé Luís
- (Equatorial Guinea) Luis Asué
- (Guinea-Bissau) Cícero Semedo
- (Nigeria) Abiodun Agunbiade
- (Nigeria) Elderson Echiéjilé

== Managerial history ==
- (Portugal) Toni Conceição (July 1999– June 2002)
- (Portugal) António Caldas (June 2002– November 2002)
- (Portugal) Toni Conceição (November 2002– December 2002)
- (Portugal) António Caldas (December 2002– October 2005)
- (Portugal) Micael Sequeira (October 2005– June 2006)
- (Portugal) Artur Jorge (May 2012– October 2012)
- (Portugal) Toni (October 2012– May 2013)
- (Portugal) José Alberto Costa (June 2013– February 2014)
- (Portugal) Bruno Pereira (February 2014– June 2014)
- (Portugal) Fernando Pereira (June 2014– February 2015)
- (Portugal) Abel Ferreira (February 2015– April 2017)
- (Portugal) João Aroso (April 2017– January 2018)
- (Brazil) Wender Said (January 2018– February 2019)
- (Portugal) Rui Santos (February 2019– September 2019)
- (Portugal) Ruben Amorim (September 2019– December 2019)
- (Portugal) Vasco Faísca (December 2019– June 2021)
- (Portugal) Artur Jorge (June 2021– May 2022)
- (Portugal) Custódio Castro (May 2022– )
