= 2005–06 Liga de Honra =

72nd season of second-tier football league in Portugal

Liga de Honra
- Season: 2005–06
- Champions: SC Beira-Mar
- Promoted: SC Beira-Mar; CD Aves
- Relegated: Moreirense FC; SC Covilhã; FC Barreirense; FC Marco; AD Ovarense; FC Maia

The 2005–06 Liga de Honra season was the 16th season of the competition and the 72nd season of recognised second-tier football in Portugal.

== Overview ==
The league was contested by 18 teams with SC Beira-Mar winning the championship and gaining promotion to the Primeira Liga along with CD Aves. At the other end of the table Moreirense FC, SC Covilhã, FC Barreirense, FC Marco, AD Ovarense and FC Maia were relegated to the Segunda Divisão.

== League standings ==
Pos	Team	Pld	W	D	L	GF	GA	GD	Pts	Promotion or relegation
1	Beira-Mar (C, P)	34	18	14	2	45	18	+27	68	Promotion to Primeira Liga
2	Desportivo das Aves (P)	34	18	10	6	47	30	+17	64	Promotion to Primeira Liga
3	Leixões	34	17	11	6	47	19	+28	62	
4	Varzim	34	13	13	8	47	39	+8	52	
5	Olhanense	34	13	13	8	41	28	+13	52	
6	Santa Clara	34	13	12	9	45	32	+13	51	
7	Gondomar	34	14	9	11	56	41	+15	51	
8	Chaves	34	13	11	10	40	36	+4	50	
9	Estoril	34	11	12	11	44	43	+1	45	
10	Feirense	34	12	8	14	44	44	0	44	
11	Vizela	34	11	11	12	42	48	−6	44	
12	Portimonense	34	10	13	11	36	36	0	43	
13	Moreirense (R)	34	11	9	14	36	37	−1	42	Relegation to Segunda Divisão
14	Sporting da Covilhã (R)	34	10	12	12	37	42	−5	42	Relegation to Segunda Divisão
15	Barreirense (R)	34	8	11	15	31	41	−10	35	Relegation to Segunda Divisão
16	Marco (R)	34	7	8	19	32	63	−31	29	Relegation to Segunda Divisão
17	Ovarense (R)	34	6	7	21	36	72	−36	25	Relegation to Segunda Divisão
18	Maia (R)	34	6	6	22	30	67	−37	24	Relegation to Segunda Divisão

(C) Champions; (P) Promoted; (R) Relegated
