= Leandro (footballer, born 1977) =

Brazilian footballer

Personal information
- Full name: Leandro Almeida da Silva
- Date of birth: 19 January 1977 (age 49)
- Place of birth: Volta Redonda, Brazil
- Height: 1.78 m (5 ft 10 in)
- Position: Striker

Senior career*
Years	Team	Apps	(Gls)
?–2000	Volta Redonda		
2000–2001	Vianense		
2001–2003	Paredes	74	(31)
2003–2004	Feirense	16	(1)
2004–2005	Gondomar	27	(4)
2005	Aliados Lordelo	8	(0)
2006	Ovarense	15	(3)
2006–2009	Estoril	66	(13)
2009	Chaves	0	(0)
2009–2010	Vizela	28	(11)
2010–2011	Ribeirão	1	(0)
2011–2012	Louletano	30	(8)
2012–2013	Tirsense	19	(0)
Total		284	(71)
- * Club domestic league appearances and goals

Leandro Almeida da Silva (born 19 January 1977 in Volta Redonda, Rio de Janeiro), known simply as Leandro, is a Brazilian retired footballer who played as a striker.
