= A.D. Ovarense =

Portuguese sports club

Ovarense
- Full name: Associação Desportiva Ovarense
- Nicknames: ADO, alvinegra
- Founded: 19 December 1921
- Ground: Estádio Marques da Silva, Ovar
- Capacity: 3,200
- Chairman: António Godinho
- Manager: Helder Castro
- League: Campeonato de Portugal
- 2025–26: AF Aveiro First Division, 1st
- Website: https://adovarense.pt/
Home colours	Away colours

Associação Desportiva Ovarense, commonly known as Ovarense, is a Portuguese sports club from the city of Ovar, Aveiro. The club was founded on 19 December 1921. It currently plays at the Estádio Marques da Silva which they have played in since 1954. The stadium also plays host to the club's reserve and youth teams. As a club it is well known for its basketball team who have won nineteen major trophies since their establishment in 1970. The club currently competes in the AF Aveiro Second Division following a seventh-place finish in the 2011–12 AF Aveiro Second Division season.

Ovarense was one of the founding members of the Aveiro Football Association along with Anadia, Beira-Mar, Bustelo, Clube dos Galitos, Espinho, Fogueirese, Paços Brandão, Sanjoanense, SC Oliveirense, Sociedade Recreio Artístico and UD Oliveirense. The association was founded on 22 September 1924. The club has played on various occasions in the Liga de Honra, Segunda Divisão and the Terceira Divisão. Their most recent Liga de Honra appearance came in the 2005–06 Liga de Honra season. Shortly after, serious financial problems led to the team's demotion to the fifth level of national football.

== Honours ==
- Segunda Divisão B: 2
  - 1990–91, 1999–2000
- Terceira Divisão: 1
  - 1949–50
- AF Aveiro Championship: 5
  - 1930–31, 1932–33, 1934–35, 1935–36, 1938–39
- AF Aveiro First Division: 4
  - 1949–50, 1954–55, 1970–71, 1980–81

== Notable former players ==
- (Portugal) António Sousa
- (Portugal) Carlos Marques
- (Portugal) Dito
- (Portugal) Eduardo Luís
- (Portugal) Gil
- (Portugal) Hélder Sousa
- (Portugal) Hugo Coelho
- (Portugal) Ivo Damas
- (Portugal) Jaime Mercês
- (Portugal) Jorge Humberto
- (Portugal) Jorge Silva
- (Portugal) José Chevela
- (Portugal) José Luís
- (Portugal) José Nunes
- (Portugal) José Pedro
- (Portugal) Luís Miguel
- (Portugal) Miguel Areias
- (Portugal) Paulo Teixeira
- (Portugal) Pedro Emanuel
- (Portugal) Pedro Mingote
- (Portugal) Pedro Pinheiro
- (Portugal) Rui Correia
- (Portugal) Rui Pataca
- (Portugal) Sérgio Leite
- (Portugal) Valdir
- (Portugal) Zé Gomes
- (Albania) Klevis Dalipi
- (Angola) Jaime Linares
- (Angola) Marco Abreu
- (Angola) Wilson
- (Bosnia and Herzegovina) Svetislav Perduv
- (Brazil) Edu
- (Brazil) Edu Sousa
- (Brazil) Leandro
- (Brazil) Leandro Netto
- (Brazil) Nei
- (Cape Verde) Caló
- (Cape Verde) Dário Furtado
- (Cape Verde) Mateus Lopes
- (Ghana) Emmanuel Duah
- (Guinea-Bissau) Adilson
- (Guinea-Bissau) Inzaghi Donígio
- (Mozambique) Jojó
- (Saint Kitts and Nevis) Tiquanny Williams
- (Serbia) Jovo Simanić

== Managers ==
- 2001–02: (Portugal) Pedro Miguel
- until 2012: António Tavares

== League and cup history ==
Season	Div.	Pos.	Pl.	W	D	L	GS	GA	P	Cup	Notes
1990–91	2DS	1	34	26	7	5	80	24	59	Quarter Finals	Promoted
1991–92	2H	13	34	9	13	12	38	42	31	Round 3	
1992–93	2H	7	34	11	14	9	42	37	36	Round 3	
1993–94	2H	7	34	11	11	12	43	43	33	Round 4	
1994–95	2H	8	34	13	9	12	37	41	35	Quarter Finals	
1995–96	2H	18	34	3	6	26	25	88	15	Round 3	Relegated
1996–97	2DS	7	34	12	14	8	39	34	50	Round 3	
1997–98	2DS	8	34	14	9	11	33	32	53	Round 3	
1998–99	2DS	6	34	15	8	11	42	35	53	Round 2	
1999–00	2DS	1	38	22	12	4	77	37	78	Round 3	Promoted
2000–01	2H	11	34	12	5	17	42	53	41	Round 4	
2001–02	2H	14	34	10	10	14	42	52	40	Round 4	
2002–03	2H	9	34	13	7	14	49	48	46	Round 4	
2003–04	2H	9	34	11	11	12	51	54	44	Round 4	
2004–05	2H	12	34	11	8	15	40	51	41	Round 3	
2005–06	2H	17	34	6	7	21	36	72	25	Round 4	
2008–09	2DA	1	30	25	4	1	66	23	79		
2009–10	1DA	1	23	18	4	1	66	23	58		
2011–12	2DA	7	24	12	4	8	50	26	40		^{[A]}

A. ^A Did not qualify for the 2011–12 Taça de Portugal. The club reached the third round of the 2011–12 AF Aveiro Cup.

Last updated: 18 July 2012
Div. = Division; 2H = Liga de Honra; 2DS = Portuguese Second Division; 2DA = AF Aveiro Second Division

Pos. = Position; Pl = Match played; W = Win; D = Draw; L = Lost; GS = Goal scored; GA = Goal against; P = Points
