= C.D. Aves =

Portuguese professional football club

Desportivo das Aves
- Full name: Clube Desportivo das Aves
- Founded: 12 November 1930; 95 years ago
- Dissolved: 8 October 2020; 5 years ago
- Ground: Estádio do Clube Desportivo das Aves
- Capacity: 6,230
- Chairman: Armando Silva
- 2020–21: Campeonato de Portugal, (Withdrew)
- Website: www.cdaves.pt
Home colours	Away colours	Third colours

Clube Desportivo das Aves (Portuguese pronunciation: [ˈkluβɨ ðɨʃpuɾˈtivu ðɐz ˈavɨʃ]), commonly known as Desportivo das Aves, or simply as Aves, was a Portuguese football club based in Vila das Aves, Santo Tirso. The club was founded on 12 November 1930 and played at the Estádio do Clube Desportivo das Aves, which holds a seating capacity of 6,230.

As a sports club, it has football schools for junior players and two futsal teams for both men and women, as well as a football trial system to help younger players come through the academy. The club's official supporters' group was the Força Avense.

== History ==
Aves have spent most of their history in the lower leagues, having their debut Primeira Liga season in 1985–86 after winning consecutively the second and third divisions. They returned to the top flight for 2000–01 and 2006–07, again for one season each.

Aves won promotion from LigaPro in 2016–17, finishing as runners-up to Portimonense under the management of José Mota. On 20 May 2018, the club defeated Sporting CP 2–1 and won their first Taça de Portugal. However, Aves did not qualify for the 2018–19 UEFA Europa League group stage because they failed to obtain a license for European competitions. The team were relegated in 2019–20, with five games to play, were marred by financial problems. For these reasons, they and Vitória de Setúbal were given a further relegation to the third tier.

On 23 September 2020, Aves withdrew before the start of the season. Due to unpaid debts to other clubs, the club received a transfer ban from FIFA, which it sidestepped by founding new entity Clube Desportivo das Aves 1930 in October. The Sociedade Anónima Desportiva, a separate legal entity to the club, was declared insolvent in April 2021 by the District Court of Santo Tirso.

The club's Taça de Portugal was put up for auction in October 2022 as part of the insolvency proceedings of the SAD. The trophy was bought by the municipality of Santo Tirso for €30,000.

== Stadium ==
Desportivo das Aves played at the Estádio do Clube Desportivo das Aves in Vila das Aves, Santo Tirso, holding a seating capacity of 6,230. The stadium also plays host to the reserve side's home games. It was inaugurated on 8 December 1981.

It underwent many renovations during the new millennium, especially in 2000, when Desportivo das Aves gained promotion to the Primeira Liga for the second time in their history. When the stadium was built, there were 12,500 seats available, but it currently seats only 6,230 after the club decided to remove chairs.

== Honours ==
- Taça de Portugal
  - Winners (1): 2017–18

== Players ==
=== Last squad ===
As of 12 September 2020

Note: Flags indicate national team as defined under FIFA eligibility rules; some limited exceptions apply. Players may hold more than one non-FIFA nationality.

No.	Pos.	Nation	Player
6	DF	BRA	Bruninho
13	DF	BRA	Jaílson
20	FW	GBS	Zidane Banjaqui
28	FW	POR	Bruno Lourenço

No.	Pos.	Nation	Player
31	MF	BRA	Luiz Fernando
—	GK	BRA	Guilherme
—	MF	BRA	Léo Murilo

== Managerial history ==
- (Portugal) Henrique Nunes (1992–1994)
- (Portugal) Manuel Barbosa (1994–1995)
- (Portugal) Eduardo Luís (1995–1996)
- (Portugal) Luís Campos (1996–1998)
- (Portugal) António Frasco (1998)
- (Portugal) Professor Neca (1998–2000)
- (Portugal) Carlos Carvalhal (2000–2001)
- (Portugal) Luís Agostinho (2001–2002)
- (Portugal) António Caetano (2002–2003)
- (Portugal) Carlos Garcia (June, 2003–29 Oct 2003)
- (Portugal) José Gomes (29 Oct 2003 – 9 May 2004)
- (Portugal) Manuel Correia (June, 2004–11 Jan 2005)
- (Portugal) Professor Neca (11 Jan 2005 – 20 May 2007)
- (Portugal) José Gomes (25 May 2007 – 5 Dec 2007)
- (Portugal) Henrique Nunes (5 Dec 2007 – 24 May 2009)
- (Portugal) Micael Sequeira (6 June 2009 – 6 Oct 2010)
- (Portugal) Vítor Oliveira (7 Oct 2010 – 29 May 2011)
- (Portugal) Paulo Fonseca (7 June 2011 – 28 May 2012)
- (Portugal) José Vilaça (22 June 2012 – 18 Feb 2013)
- (Portugal) Professor Neca (18 Feb 2013 – 18 May 2013)
- (Portugal) Fernando Valente (28 June 2014 – 6 January 2015)
- (Portugal) Emanuel Simões (6 January 2015 – 9 July 2015)
- (Portugal) Abel Xavier (9 July 2015 – 4 September 2015)
- (Portugal) Ulisses Morais (5 September 2015 – 17 May 2016)
- (Portugal) Ivo Vieira (26 May 2016 – 15 February 2017)
- (Portugal) José Mota (18 February 2017 – 22 May 2017)
- (Portugal) Ricardo Soares (27 May 2017 – 2 October 2017)
- (Angola) Lito Vidigal (2 October 2017 – 22 January 2018)
- (Portugal) José Mota (24 January 2018 – 16 January 2019)
- (Portugal) Augusto Inácio (16 January 2019 – 21 October 2019)
- (Portugal) Nuno Manta Santos (13 November 2019 – 17 August 2020)

== League and cup history ==
Season	Div.	Pos.	Pl.	W	D	L	GS	GA	P	Cup	League Cup	Notes
1985–86	1D	13	30	7	8	15	25	42	22	Round 4		Relegated
1986–87	2DS	8	34	13	8	13	44	47	47	Round 6		
1987–88
1988–89
1989–90	2DS	3	34	19	7	8	50	29	45	Round 4		Promoted
1990–91	2H	12	38	14	11	13	44	41	39	Round 3		
1991–92	2H	9	34	12	11	11	38	37	35	Round 4		
1992–93	2H	9	34	10	13	11	43	44	33	Round 3		
1993–94	2H	10	34	12	8	14	36	45	32	Quarter-finals		
1994–95	2H	15	34	10	9	16	38	40	29	Round 3		
1995–96	2H	4	34	17	7	10	53	41	58	Round 5		
1996–97	2H	8	34	13	8	13	44	47	47	Round 6		
1997–98	2H	15	34	11	5	18	48	64	38	Round 5		
1998–99	2H	4	34	14	9	11	46	43	51	Round 3		
1999–00	2H	3	34	18	7	9	33	24	61	Round 3		Promoted
2000–01	1D	17	34	4	10	20	31	68	22	Round 5		Relegated
2001–02	2H	7	34	14	5	15	50	51	47	Round 4		
2002–03	2H	6	34	13	8	13	41	38	47	Round 3		
2003–04	2H	8	34	13	6	15	42	53	45	Round 5		
2004–05	2H	5	34	15	6	13	45	35	51	Round 4		
2005–06	2H	2	34	18	10	6	47	30	64	Round 6		Promoted
2006–07	1D	16	30	5	7	18	22	42	22	Round 4		Relegated
2007–08	2H	8	30	10	9	11	43	39	39	Round 5	Round 1	
2008–09	2H	11	30	9	9	12	30	36	36	Round 4	Round 1	
2009–10	2H	9	30	9	11	10	33	33	38	Round 2	Round 1	
2010–11	2H	8	30	10	10	10	35	31	40	Round 2	Second Group Stage	
2011–12	2H	3	30	12	14	4	38	23	50	Quarter-finals	First Group Stage	
2012–13	2LP	5	42	16	17	9	47	42	65	Round 4	First Group Stage	
2013–14	2LP	4	42	20	11	11	46	35	71	Round 5	First Group Stage	
2014–15	2LP	18	46	12	17	17	52	58	53	Round 4	First Group Stage	
2015–16	2LP	8	46	19	10	17	58	48	67	Round 5	Round 1	
2016–17	2LP	2	42	23	12	7	63	38	81	Round 3	Round 1	Promoted
2017–18	1D	13	34	9	7	18	36	51	34	Winners	Second Round	First trophy in club's history.
2018–19	1D	14	34	10	6	18	35	49	36	Quarter-finals	Third Round	Lost in the 2018 Supercup
2019–20	1D	18	34	5	2	27	24	68	17	Third Round	Second Round	Withdrew from the league in May Relegated

Last updated: 27 Aug 2018
Div. = Division; LP = Liga Portugal; LP2 = Liga Portugal 2; 2DS = Portuguese Second Division; 2LP = Portuguese Segunda Liga
Pos. = Position; Pl = Match played; W = Win; D = Draw; L = Lost; GS = Goal scored; GA = Goal against; P = Points

== Futsal ==
Desportivo das Aves has a futsal team that has played top tier futsal in the Liga Sport Zone.
