= F.C. Marco =

Association football club

Marco
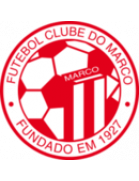
- Full name: Futebol Clube do Marco
- Founded: 1927
- Ground: Estádio Municipal, Marco de Canaveses, Portugal
- Capacity: 6,000
Home colours	Away colours

Futebol Clube do Marco was a Portuguese football team based in Marco de Canaveses, Porto District. Founded in 1927, it held home games at Estádio Municipal de Marco de Canaveses, which has a 6,000 seat capacity. It might return to its original name for the 2025–26 season.

== History ==
Futebol Clube do Marco was founded on 25 May 1927. In 2000, it reached the second division for only the second time, being relegated at the end of the season, but immediately gaining promotion back.

During four consecutive seasons, Marco competed in the second level. In 2004–05, it achieved its best ever classification in the category, finishing in fourth position, nine points behind last promotee C.F. Estrela da Amadora. In the following campaign, the club ended its Portuguese Cup run with a valiant display against eventual winners FC Porto, losing 0–1 away.

=== Decline and phoenix club ===
With Avelino Ferreira Torres distancing himself from the club, overdue salaries and financial difficulties began to be a constant issue. At the end of the 2005–06 season, F.C. Marco was relegated to the II Divisão B. Although they managed to stay in the league on the field, they missed four matches of the 2007–08 season.

On 27 September 2007, the Portuguese Football Federation punished the club with relegation, suspension from all activity during two years and a €2,500 fine, following failure to appear in four league games.

A new side was created in 2009–10 as Associação Desportiva de Marco de Canaveses 09 (AD Marco 09 for short), competing in the Porto Second Regional Division, and achieving promotion in the first season. However, it only returned to national competitions em 2024.

=== Ressurgence ===
In December 2024, with the club now stabilized in the Campeonato de Portugal, A.D. Marco 09 members approved the return of the name and emblem of F.C. Marco, refounding the old club. The board intends to make the change official starting from the 2025–26 season.

== Appearances ==
- Tier 2: 6
- Tier 3: 19
- Tier 4: 5
- Portuguese Cup: 27

== League and Cup history ==
Season	Ti.	Pos.	Pl.	W	D	L	GS	GA	P	Cup	Notes
1999–00	3	1	34	21	6	7	71	42	69	Round 2	Promoted
2000–01	2	17	34	9	6	19	39	66	33	Round 3	Relegated
2001–02	3	1	34	25	8	5	64	38	83	Round 2	Promoted
2002–03	2	13	34	11	11	12	46	49	33	Round 5	
2003–04	2	15	34	11	8	15	41	53	41	Round 6	
2004–05	2	4	34	13	12	9	51	43	51	Round 4	
2005–06	2	16	34	7	8	19	32	63	29	Round 4	Relegated
2006–07	3	9	26	7	10	9	31	37	31	Round 4	

Last updated: 25 June 2015
Ti. = Tier; 1 = Portuguese League; 2 = Liga de Honra; 3 = Segunda Divisão / Campeonato Nacional de Seniores
4 = Terceira Divisão; 5 = AF Porto First Division
Pos. = Position; Pl = Match played; W = Win; D = Draw; L = Lost; GS = Goal scored; GA = Goal against; P = Points
