= Liga Portugal 2 =

Association football league

- Organising body: Liga Portuguesa de Futebol Profissional (LPFP)
- Founded: 1990; 36 years ago (as Segunda Divisão de Honra)
- Country: Portugal
- Confederation: UEFA
- Number of clubs: 18
- Level on pyramid: 2
- Promotion to: Liga Portugal
- Relegation to: Liga 3
- Domestic cup: Taça de Portugal
- League cup: Taça da Liga
- Current champions: Marítimo (2025–26)
- Most championships: Paços de Ferreira (4 titles)
- Broadcasters: Sport TV; Benfica TV; Porto Canal
- Sponsor: Meu Super
- Website: www.ligaportugal.pt
- Current: 2026–27 Liga Portugal 2

The Liga Portugal 2 (Portuguese pronunciation: [ˈliɣɐ puɾtuˈɣal dojʃ]), currently known as Liga Portugal Meu Super for sponsorship reasons, or colloquially still as the Segunda Liga (Second League), is the second-highest division of the Portuguese football league system. At the end of each season, the two top-finishing teams are promoted to the top-tier Liga Portugal and the two lowest-ranked teams are relegated to the third-tier Liga 3. Prior to the 2021–22 season, relegated teams moved to the Campeonato de Portugal, which shifted from the third tier to the fourth tier.

The division began in 1990 as the Segunda Divisão de Honra (Second Division of Honour), a unified national tier, superseding the regionalized Segunda Divisão (Second Division) as the second tier of Portuguese football. When the division came under the auspices of the Liga Portuguesa de Futebol Profissional (LPFP) in 1999, it was renamed the Segunda Liga (Second League), a name that was kept until 2016, except between 2005 and 2012, when it was known as the Liga de Honra (League of Honour). Rebranded as LigaPro in 2016, the competition assumed its current naming in the early stages of the 2020–21 season.

As of the 2018–19 season, it is contested nationwide by 18 teams, including the reserve sides (B teams) of several top-flight clubs. Twenty different teams have won the division title; the most successful is Paços de Ferreira, with four wins, including the inaugural season and the most recently concluded 2018–19 season.

== History ==
Before 1990, there was only one professional nationwide football league in Portugal, the first-tier Primeira Divisão (First Division). Its lower placed teams were relegated to the Segunda Divisão (Second Division), a regionally-divided league, whose top teams were promoted to the first level. From the 1990–91 season onward, the Portuguese Football Federation (FPF) created a new second-tier professional league, taking the name Segunda Divisão de Honra. Similarly to what would happen in other countries in Europe in the 1990s, the moniker of the previous Segunda Divisão passed down to the level below, making it the third-tier league and was renamed Segunda Divisão B. While statistically,

In 1999, the Portuguese League for Professional Football (LPFP, Liga Portuguesa de Futebol Profissional) took control of the two nationwide levels and renamed the league Segunda Liga (Second League), while in 2005 it was renamed Liga de Honra and the Segunda Divisão B reverted to its original name. In 2012, the second tier of Portuguese football was renamed again Segunda Liga and in 2016 it was renamed LigaPro.

The Segunda Liga trophy, since 2011

Identity of the Portuguese second tier
Period	Name	Notes
1934-1936	Campeonato da Liga - Segunda Divisão	"Old" Tier 2
1936-1990	(Campeonato Nacional da); Segunda Divisão	"Old" Tier 2
1990-1999	Segunda Divisão de Honra	
1999-2006	Liga de Honra (Segunda Liga)	
2006-2010	Liga Vitalis	Sponsored
2010-2012	Liga Orangina	Sponsored
2012-13	Segunda Liga	
2013-14	Liga2 Cabovisão	Sponsored
2014-15	Segunda Liga	
2015-2019	Ledman LigaPro	Sponsored
2019-20	LigaPro	
2020-2024	Liga Portugal 2 SABSEG	Sponsored
2024-present	Liga Portugal MeuSuper	Sponsored

== Format ==
During the course of a season, each club plays every other team twice — once at their home stadium and once at their opponent's — for a total of 34 games. At the end of each season, the two top teams are promoted to the Liga Portugal and the two lowest ranked teams will be relegated to the new Liga 3 (previously they were relegated to Campeonato de Portugal). There will be also a two-legged promotion/relegation play-off involving the 16th placed teams of Primeira Liga and 3rd placed team from Liga Portugal 2., There is also a play-off in the same style between the 16th-placed Liga Portugal 2 team and the third-placed team of the lower Liga 3. The B teams cannot be promoted to Liga Portugal but can be demoted if they end the season in one of the relegation positions or if the main team is also relegated.

=== Format history ===
In the 1990-91 season, the new second division kicked-off as a 20-team round-robin league. This was in contrast to the 54-club 1989–90 Segunda Divisão, divided regionally into three groups of eighteen (North, Centre, South). The winner of each group (série) and Famalicão were promoted to the First Division due to a judicial decision forcing a temporary expansion to 20 sides and the new Divisão de Honra was thus composed of two relegated teams from the upper tier (Portimonense and Feirense), six teams from each of the three groups and Leixões, the winner of a play-off called the "Liguilha". Seven teams would be relegated at the end of the season to reduce the championship to 18 for 1991-92.

During this period, three teams would be promoted and relegated on either side of the table, before being reduced again in 2006-07 to 16 teams, forcing a promotion of only two to the Primeira Liga and a relegation of six to the Segunda Divisão «B», the season prior. From that season onwards, only two would be promoted or relegated from the second tier. In 2011-12 and in 2013-14 the league would be increased to 22 and 24 teams, respectively. The initial expansion to 22 would not be done through the lower division however, as the new format allowed the entry of six "B" teams representing Benfica, Braga, Porto, Sporting and Vitória SC into the pyramid as well as the promotion of Marítimo B. At time of approval in December 2011, the Primeira Liga was also meant to increase to 18 sides, allowing two teams to be promoted from the Segunda B. However, three teams (Nacional, Porto and Sporting) impugned the League General Assembly. FPF's Justice Council agreed - expansion without relegation would hurt sporting merit and the decision would therefore be void. Simultaneously, União de Leiria's double relegation (one on sporting merit, one by administration) and third-tier champions Varzim's financial crisis impeded their presence in the league. Aside the fifteen teams and six B teams, the final slot was filled by the lower level runners-up Tondela. Later, in 2013-14 and announced beforehand, relegation was in fact suspended allowing for the enlargement to 24. The latter season also experimented with a promotion playoff with the upper tier due to the administrative reintroduction of Boavista in the top tier, but was not repeated in the seasons directly after.

The excessive number of matches among other factors led the increase to be shortlived. Consequently, the number of teams was reduced every season until it reached 18 teams in the 2018–19 season. In 2016–17, four teams were directly relegated with two others going into a play-off with two of the Campeonato Nacional de Séniores and the following season four more with relegated to reach the intended eighteen-club league. The most recent change is the introduction of play-offs in the 2020-21, in which Liga Portugal created a play-offs between divisions.

== Broadcasting ==
Since 2018–19, all the matches are broadcast by Sport TV, though some of them are only broadcast through online streaming due to timetables. The exceptions are Benfica B, Porto B and Sporting B home games, broadcast by Benfica TV, Porto Canal and Sporting TV, respectively.

== Clubs ==
=== Stadia and locations ===
For 2026–27 season.

Team	Location	Stadium	Capacity	2025–26 finish
Académica	Coimbra	Estádio Cidade de Coimbra	29,622	2nd (L3)
Amarante	Amarante	Estádio Municipal de Amarante	5,000	1st (L3)
AVS	Vila das Avese	Estádio do Clube Desportivo das Aves	6,230	18th (PL)
Benfica B	Seixal	Benfica Campus	2,644	10th
Chaves	Chaves	Estádio Municipal Eng.º Manuel Branco Teixeira	8,400	9th
Farense	Faro	Estádio de São Luís	7,000	16th
Feirense	Santa Maria da Feira	Estádio Marcolino de Castro	5,401	8th
Felgueiras	Felgueiras	Estádio Dr. Machado de Matos [pt]	7,540	11th
Leixões	Matosinhos	Estádio do Mar	6,000	7th
Lusitânia Lourosa	Lourosa	Estádio do Lusitânia de Lourosa FC	4,900	12th
Penafiel	Penafiel	Estádio Municipal 25 de Abril	5,230	14th
Portimonense	Portimão	Estádio Municipal de Portimão	4,961	15th
Porto B	Vila Nova de Gaia	Estádio Luís Filipe de Menezes	3,800	5th
Sporting CP B	Alcochete	Estádio Aurélio Pereira	1,180	13th
Tondela	Tondela	Estádio João Cardoso	5,000	17th (PL)
Torreense	Torres Vedras	Estádio Manuel Marques	2,431	3rd
União de Leiria	Leiria	Estádio Dr. Magalhães Pessoa	23,888	6th
Vizela	Vizela	Estádio do FC Vizela	6,000	4th

== Champions ==
Season	Champion	Points	Runner-up	Points	Third place	Points	Teams	Top scorer	Club	Goals
1990–91	Paços de Ferreira	51	Estoril	46	Torreense	45	20	(Bulgaria) Eduard Eranosyan	Leixões	22
1991–92	Sporting de Espinho	50	Belenenses	48	Tirsense	45	18	(Nigeria) Rashidi Yekini	Vitória FC (Setúbal)	22
1992–93	Estrela da Amadora	48	União da Madeira	47	Vitória de Setúbal	47	18	(Nigeria) Rashidi Yekini	Vitória FC (Setúbal)	34
1993–94	Tirsense	46	União de Leiria	45	Chaves	45	18	(Brazil) Edinho	Portimonense	16
1994–95	Leça	46	Campomaiorense	46	Felgueiras	44	18	(Croatia) Tihomir Rudež	Campomaiorense	20
1995–96	Rio Ave	68	Vitória de Setúbal	62	Sporting de Espinho	62	18	(Portugal) Paulo Vida	Desportivo das Aves	21
1996–97	Campomaiorense	62	Varzim	59	Académica	58	18	(Portugal) Carlos Freitas	Desportivo de Beja	17
1997–98	União de Leiria	70	Beira-Mar	64	Alverca	62	18	(Portugal) Armando Santos	Moreirense	21
1998–99	Gil Vicente	68	Belenenses	61	Santa Clara	55	18	(Brazil) Marcão	Varzim	23
1999–2000	Paços de Ferreira (2)	65	Beira-Mar	65	Desportivo das Aves	61	18	(Brazil) Marcão	Varzim	27
2000–01	Santa Clara	67	Varzim	64	Vitória de Setúbal	64	18	(Brazil) Brandão	Santa Clara	24
2001–02	Moreirense	64	Académica	62	Nacional	62	18	(Spain) Ibón Pérez (Portugal) Paulo Vida (Brazil) Rômulo (Brazil) Serginho	Chaves; Paços de Ferreira; Nacional; Nacional	18
2002–03	Rio Ave (2)	63	Alverca	60	Estrela da Amadora	57	18	(Brazil) Igor	Maia	20
2003–04	Estoril	67	Vitória de Setúbal	64	Penafiel	61	18	(Brazil) Fábio Hempel	Salgueiros	25
2004–05	Paços de Ferreira (3)	69	Naval 1º de Maio	62	Estrela da Amadora	60	18	(Brazil) Rincón	Paços de Ferreira	18
2005–06	Beira-Mar	68	Desportivo das Aves	64	Leixões	62	18	(Brazil) Cássio (Portugal) Nuno Sousa	Maia/Chaves; Gondomar	20
2006–07	Leixões	60	Vitória de Guimarães	55	Rio Ave	53	16	(Brazil) Roberto Alcântara	Leixões	17
2007–08	Trofense	52	Rio Ave	51	Vizela	50	16	(Brazil) Júlio César	Santa Clara	13
2008–09	Olhanense	58	União de Leiria	53	Santa Clara	52	16	(Brazil) Djalmir	Olhanense	20
2009–10	Beira-Mar (2)	54	Portimonense	54	Feirense	52	16	(Portugal) Reguila	Trofense	15
2010–11	Gil Vicente (2)	55	Feirense	55	Trofense	54	16	(Portugal) Bock	Freamunde	15
2011–12	Estoril (2)	57	Moreirense	52	Desportivo das Aves	50	16	(Brazil) Joeano	Arouca	19
2012–13	Belenenses	94	Arouca	73	Leixões	68	22	(Brazil) Joeano	Arouca	24
2013–14	Moreirense (2)	79	Porto B	77	Penafiel	73	22	(Portugal) Pires	Moreirense	22
2014–15	Tondela	81	União da Madeira	80	Chaves	80	24	(Portugal) Tozé Marreco (Brazil) Erivelto	Tondela; Sporting da Covilhã	23
2015–16	Porto B	86	Chaves	81	Feirense	78	24	(Nigeria) Simy	Gil Vicente	20
2016–17	Portimonense	83	Desportivo das Aves	81	União da Madeira	64	22	(Portugal) Pires	Portimonense	23
2017–18	Nacional	71	Santa Clara	66	Académico de Viseu	64	20	(Cape Verde) Ricardo Gomes	Nacional	21
2018–19	Paços de Ferreira (4)	74	Famalicão	69	Estoril	54	18	(Portugal) Pires	Penafiel	16
2019–20	Abandoned due to COVID-19 pandemic (Nacional and Farense promoted in first and second place with 10 rounds left to play)						18	(Brazil) Agdon Menezes	Oliveirense	13
2020–21	Estoril (3)	70	Vizela	66	Arouca	65	18	(Brazil) Cassiano	Vizela	16
2021–22	Rio Ave (3)	70	Casa Pia	68	Chaves	64	18	(Brazil) João Carlos	Académica de Coimbra	17
2022–23	Moreirense (3)	79	Farense	69	Estrela da Amadora	63	18	(Brazil) André Clóvis	Académico de Viseu	28
2023–24	Santa Clara (2)	73	Nacional	71	AVS	64	18	(Brazil) Nenê	AVS	23
2024–25	Tondela (2)	64	Alverca	63	Vizela	62	18	(Australia) Anthony Carter (Brazil) Juan Muñoz	Alverca; União de Leiria	15
2025–26	Marítimo	66	Académico de Viseu	59	Torreense	59	18	(Brazil) André Clóvis	Académico de Viseu	23

== Statistics ==
=== Performance by club ===
Club	Winners	Runners-up	Winning seasons	Runner-up seasons
Paços de Ferreira	4	0	1990–91, 1999–2000, 2004–05, 2018–19	–
Estoril	3	1	2003–04, 2011–12, 2020–21	1990–91
Rio Ave	3	1	1995–96, 2002–03, 2021–22	2007–08
Moreirense	3	1	2001–02, 2013–14, 2022–23	2011–12
Beira-Mar	2	2	2005–06, 2009–10	1997–98, 1999–2000
Santa Clara	2	1	2000–01, 2023–24	2017–18
Gil Vicente	2	0	1998–99, 2010–11	–
Tondela	2	0	2014–15, 2024–25	–
União de Leiria	1	2	1997–98	1993–94, 2008–09
Belenenses	1	2	2012–13	1991–92, 1998–99
Campomaiorense	1	1	1996–97	1994–95
Porto B	1	1	2015–16	2013–14
Portimonense	1	1	2016–17	2009–10
Nacional	1	1	2017–18	2023–24
Espinho	1	0	1991–92	–
Estrela da Amadora	1	0	1992–93	–
Tirsense	1	0	1993–94	–
Leça	1	0	1994–95	–
Leixões	1	0	2006–07	–
Trofense	1	0	2007–08	–
Olhanense	1	0	2008–09	–
Marítimo	1	0	2025–26	–
Varzim	0	2	–	1996–97, 2000–01
Vitória de Setúbal	0	2	–	1995–96, 2003–04
União da Madeira	0	2	–	1992–93, 2014–15
Desportivo das Aves	0	2	–	2005–06, 2016–17
Alverca	0	2	–	2002–03, 2024–25
Académica	0	1	–	2001–02
Naval 1º de Maio	0	1	–	2004–05
Vitória de Guimarães	0	1	–	2006–07
Feirense	0	1	–	2010–11
Arouca	0	1	–	2012–13
Chaves	0	1	–	2015–16
Famalicão	0	1	–	2018–19
Vizela	0	1	–	2020–21
Casa Pia	0	1	–	2021–22
Farense	0	1	–	2022–23

== All-time table ==
The all-time Liga Portugal 2 table is an overall record of all match results, points, and goals of every team that has played in Liga Portugal 2 since its inception as a professional division in 1990. The table is accurate as of the end of the 2025–26 season. 2019–20 league standings are not attributed due to the competition being abandoned. For comparison, older seasons have been calculated according to the three-points-per-win rule.

Pos	Team	S	Pts	GP	W	D	L	GF	GA	GD	1st	2nd	3rd	4th	5th	6th	T	Debut	Since/ Last App	Best	Notes
1	Penafiel	30	1418	1030	378	294	358	1249	1203	46	–	–	2	–	5	2	8	1992–93	2015–16	3	
2	Feirense	27	1301	932	345	266	321	1125	1083	42	–	1	2	1	2	2	8	1990–91	2019–20	2	
3	Desportivo das Aves	25	1275	882	344	243	295	1093	1026	67	–	2	1	3	2	1	9	1990–91	2016–17	2	^{[A]}
4	Leixões	24	1127*	850	292	254	304	949	961	-12	1	–	2	–	–	2	5	1990–91	2010–11	1	^{[B]}
5	Portimonense	21	1009	746	264	217	265	914	919	-5	1	1	–	1	1	2	6	1990–91	2024–25	1	
6	Varzim	19	932	678	246	194	238	802	837	-35	–	2	–	3	–	–	5	1990–91	2021–22	2	
7	Santa Clara	18	930	640	249	183	208	770	698	72	2	1	2	2	–	1	8	1998–99	2023–24	1	
8	Chaves	18	904	626	239	183	204	763	709	54	–	1	3	–	1	1	6	1993–94	2024–25	2	
9	Académico de Viseu	19	890	694	231	197	256	752	814	-62	–	1	1	2	–	–	4	1990–91	2025–26	2	
10	Académica	16	834	560	235	129	186	709	598	111	–	1	1	3	3	3	11	1990–91	2026–27	2	
11	Sporting da Covilhã	21	828	716	204	216	286	742	871	-129	–	–	–	1	–	1	2	1996–97	2022–23	4	
12	Estoril	17	812	548	219	155	181	693	581	112	3	1	1	1	1	–	7	1990–91	2020–21	1	
13	Benfica B	14	739	518	203	130	185	785	704	81	–	–	–	3	2	1	6	2012–13	2012–13	4	
14	Porto B	14	724	518	197	133	188	702	670	32	1	1	–	–	2	–	4	2012–13	2012–13	1	
15	Oliveirense	17	679	596	172	163	261	684	875	-191	–	–	–	1	1	1	3	2001–02	2025–26	4	
16	Paços de Ferreira	12	651	412	177	120	115	529	443	86	4	–	–	1	2	–	7	1990–91	2023–24	1	
17	União da Madeira	13	633	478	163	144	171	580	572	8	–	2	1	–	–	–	3	1992–93	2017–18	2	^{[C]}
18	Rio Ave	11	621	366	177	90	96	528	379	149	3	1	1	2	2	–	9	1991–92	2021–22	1	
19	Nacional	13	616	436	164	124	148	583	537	46	1	1	1	–	–	1	4	1991–92	2023–24	1	
20	Moreirense	11	555	374	151	102	121	517	451	66	3	1	–	–	–	–	4	1995–96	2022–23	1	
21	Felgueiras	12	547	408	141	124	143	482	482	0	–	–	1	1	–	1	3	1992–93	2004–05	3	^{[D]}
22	Beira-Mar	10	538	348	143	109	96	418	333	85	2	2	–	–	–	1	5	1995–96	2014–15	1	
23	Freamunde	12	514	432	128	130	174	499	578	-79	–	–	–	–	1	1	2	1990–91	2016–17	5	
24	Sporting de Espinho	11	511	378	134	109	135	471	437	34	1	–	1	–	–	–	2	1990–91	2004–05	1	
25	Gil Vicente	9	499*	344	130	118	96	433	356	77	2	–	–	2	–	–	4	1997–98	2017–18	1	^{[E]}
26	União de Leiria	9	482	306	133	83	90	425	307	118	1	2	–	–	–	2	5	1990–91	2023–24	1	
27	Farense	9	458*	328	124	88	116	389	356	33	–	1	–	–	–	–	1	2002–03	2025–26	2	^{[H]}
28	Maia	10	457	344	126	79	139	477	496	-19	–	–	–	1	1	–	2	1990–91	2005–06	4	^{[F]}
29	Ovarense	11	431	374	110	101	163	446	582	-136	–	–	–	–	–	1	1	1991–92	2005–06	6	
30	Trofense	10	421	348	108	97	143	358	459	-101	1	–	1	–	–	–	2	2006–07	2021–22	1	
31	Naval 1º de Maio	10	419*	310	111	103	96	420	384	36	–	1	–	2	–	–	3	1998–99	2013–14	2	^{[G]}
32	Olhanense	9	419	326	109	92	125	345	379	-34	1	–	–	–	1	–	2	1991–92	2016–17	1	
33	Sporting B	7	418	290	116	70	104	401	373	28	–	–	–	1	1	1	3	2012–13	2025–26	4	
34	Torreense	9	397	310	107	76	127	361	408	-47	–	–	2	–	1	–	3	1990–91	2022–23	3	
35	Vizela	8	390	268	98	96	74	326	289	37	–	1	2	1	–	–	4	2005–06	2024–25	2	
36	Estrela da Amadora	7	382	238	100	82	56	319	253	66	1	–	3	1	–	–	5	1991–92	2022–23	1	
37	União de Lamas	9	362	306	98	68	140	310	433	-123	–	–	–	–	–	2	2	1994–95	2002–03	6	
38	Tondela	6	352	232	90	82	60	302	262	40	2	–	–	–	–	1	3	2012–13	2026–27	1	
39	Mafra	7	342	274	81	89	104	294	340	-46	–	–	–	–	–	1	1	2015–16	2024–25	6	
40	Braga B	7	337*	290	88	80	122	328	370	-42	–	–	–	–	–	–	–	2012–13	2018–19	7	^{[I]}
41	Leça	7	331	238	92	55	91	290	317	-27	1	–	–	–	–	1	2	1993–94	2002–03	1	
42	Belenenses	6	326	204	90	56	58	280	220	60	1	2	–	–	1	–	4	1991–92	2023–24	1	
43	Famalicão	6	315	228	87	54	87	273	274	-1	–	1	–	–	–	1	2	1994–95	2018–19	2	
44	Arouca	6	314	208	84	62	62	291	232	59	–	1	1	–	1	1	4	2010–11	2020–21	2	
45	Vitória de Setúbal	5	310	170	89	43	38	302	169	133	–	2	2	–	1	–	5	1991–92	2003–04	2	
46	Alverca	6	308	204	84	56	64	256	201	55	–	2	1	–	–	–	3	1995–96	2024–25	2	
47	Vitória de Guimarães B	6	302	248	80	62	106	300	336	-36	–	–	–	–	–	–	–	2012–13	2018–19	9	
48	Campomaiorense	5	253	170	73	34	63	240	208	32	1	1	–	–	–	–	2	1992–93	2001–02	1	^{[J]}
49	Atlético CP	5	219	206	53	60	93	211	279	-68	–	–	–	–	–	–	–	2011–12	2015–16	11	
50	Gondomar	5	200	158	53	41	64	193	188	5	–	–	–	–	1	–	1	2004–05	2008–09	5	
51	Marco	5	200	170	52	44	74	210	272	-62	–	–	–	1	–	–	1	2000–01	2005–06	4	^{[K]}
52	Cova da Piedade	5	200	172	51	47	74	171	237	-66	–	–	–	–	–	–	–	2016–17	2020–21	9	
53	Louletano	4	179	140	49	32	59	164	180	-16	–	–	–	–	–	–	–	1990–91	1993–94	10	
54	Marítimo	3	173	102	48	29	25	144	106	38	1	–	–	1	–	–	2	2023–24	2025–26	1	
55	Tirsense	3	154	102	41	31	30	98	88	10	1	–	1	–	–	–	2	1991–92	1996–97	1	
56	Vilafranquense	4	142	126	33	43	50	144	182	-38	–	–	–	–	–	–	–	2019–20	2022–23	7	
57	Marítimo B	3	130*	130	35	27	68	115	172	-57	–	–	–	–	–	–	–	2012–13	2014–15	16	^{[L]}
58	Casa Pia	3	122	92	33	23	36	110	115	-5	–	1	–	–	–	–	1	2019–20	2019–20	2	
59	Benfica Castelo Branco	3	118	106	29	31	46	90	140	-50	–	–	–	–	1	–	1	1990–91	1992–93	5	
60	Oriental	2	99	92	24	27	41	94	126	-32	–	–	–	–	–	–	–	2014–15	2015–16	15	
61	Salgueiros	2	93	68	25	18	25	86	93	-7	–	–	–	–	–	1	1	2002–03	2003–04	6	
62	Felgueiras (2006)	2	90	68	22	24	22	77	76	1	–	–	–	–	–	–	–	2024–25	2024–25	9	
63	Fátima	3	86	90	18	32	40	85	121	-36	–	–	–	–	–	–	–	2007–08	2010–11	8	
64	Esposende	2	66	68	16	18	34	55	99	-44	–	–	–	–	–	–	–	1998–99	1999–2000	14	
65	Imortal	2	66	68	15	21	32	76	108	-32	–	–	–	–	–	–	–	1999–2000	2000–01	15	
66	Amora	2	65	68	14	23	31	57	95	-38	–	–	–	–	–	–	–	1992–93	1994–95	17	
67	AFS	1	64	34	20	4	10	47	31	16	–	–	1	–	–	–	1	2023–24	2026–27	3	
68	Barreirense	2	60	72	12	24	36	57	117	-60	–	–	–	–	–	–	–	1990–91	2005–06	15	
69	Vitória de Guimarães	1	55	30	16	7	7	44	20	24	–	1	–	–	–	–	1	2006–07	2006–07	2	
70	O Elvas	1	52	38	14	10	14	45	45	0	–	–	–	–	–	–	–	1990–91	1990–91	14	
71	Fafe	1	45	42	11	12	19	52	65	-13	–	–	–	–	–	–	–	2016–17	2016–17	20	
72	Lusitânia Lourosa	1	43	34	11	10	13	44	52	-8	–	–	–	–	–	–	–	2025–26	2025–26	12	
73	Desportivo de Beja	1	37	34	9	10	15	44	55	-11	–	–	–	–	–	–	–	1996–97	1996–97	17	^{[M]}
74	B-SAD	1	35	34	9	8	17	41	59	-18	–	–	–	–	–	–	–	2022–23	2022–23	16	^{[N]}
75	Águeda	1	35	38	10	5	23	41	73	-32	–	–	–	–	–	–	–	1990–91	1990–91	18	
76	Boavista	1	32	30	9	5	16	28	44	-16	–	–	–	–	–	–	–	2008–09	2008–09	15	^{[O]}
77	Real	1	32	38	8	8	22	47	61	-14	–	–	–	–	–	–	–	2017–18	2017–18	20	
78	Olivais e Moscavide	1	27	30	7	6	17	26	42	-16	–	–	–	–	–	–	–	2006–07	2006–07	15	
79	Vilaverdense	1	27*	34	8	4	22	30	59	-29	–	–	–	–	–	–	–	2023–24	2023–24	17	^{[P]}
80	Lusitano VRSA	1	25	38	4	13	21	16	45	-29	–	–	–	–	–	–	–	1990–91	1990–91	19	
81	Carregado	1	24	30	6	6	18	26	47	-21	–	–	–	–	–	–	–	2009–10	2009–10	16	
82	Amarante	0	0	0	0	0	0	0	0	0	–	–	–	–	–	–	–	2026–27	2026–27	TBD	

A. Club ended football team in 2020. Successor club AVS was founded in 2023.
B. Was deducted 3 points in the 2011–12 season and 1 point in the 2022–23 season for financial irregularities.
C. Club folded in 2021. Successor club União da Bola was founded in 2022.
D. Club folded in 2005. Successor club Felgueiras (2006) was founded in 2006.
E. Was deducted 9 points in the 2006–07 season for fielding ineligible players.
F. Club folded in 2011. Successor club Maia Lidador was founded in 2009.
G. Club folded in 2017. Successor club Naval 1893 was founded in 2017. Was deducted 17 points for financial irregularities in the 2012–13 season.
H. Was deducted 2 points in the 2015–16 season for fielding ineligible players.
I. Was deducted 2 points in the 2012–13 season and 5 points in the 2014–15 season for fielding ineligible players.
J. Club ended football team in 2013.
K. Club folded in 2007. Successor club Marco 09 was founded in 2009.
L. Was deducted 3 points in the 2012–13 season for fielding ineligible players.
M. Club ended football team in 2018.
N. Merged with Portalegrense in 2024.
O. Club ended football team in 2026.
P. Was deducted 1 point in the 2023–24 season for financial irregularities.

Last updated: 17 May 2024

Primeira Liga
Liga Portugal 2
Liga 3
Campeonato de Portugal
Portuguese District Championships
Clubs no longer in competition

Sporting positions
Preceded by Segunda Divisão	Second tier of Portuguese football 1990–	Succeeded by Incumbent
