= F.C. Maia =

Association football club in Portugal

FC Maia
- Full name: Futebol Clube da Maia
- Founded: 1954
- Dissolved: 2011
- Ground: Dr. José Vieira de Carvalho, Maia, Portugal
- Capacity: 12,000
- League: III Divisão
- 2008–09: Banned and extinct
- Website: fcmaia.pt (archived)
| Home colours | Away colours |

Futebol Clube da Maia was a Portuguese football club based in Maia, Greater Metropolitan Area of Porto. Founded on 4 April 1954, it held its home matches at the Estádio Municipal Dr. José Vieira de Carvalho, which holds 12,000 spectators. It was dissolved in 2011 after several financial problems.

== History ==
Maia never competed in the top division, but had a nine-year spell in the second level from 1997 to 2006. In its first season in the category, it faced Porto in the Taça de Portugal, losing 4–5 at home in the round of 16 after eliminating Moreirense and Feirense in the previous rounds.

The highlight of the club's history was in 2001, when it narrowly missed promotion to the Primeira Liga.

=== Decline and phoenix club ===
After the historic performance in 2000–01, F.C. Maia still fought for the promotion in the following years. But financial troubles soon arrived, and in 2005–06 the team was relegated to the third tier, the II Divisão.

At the end of the 2006–07 season, Maia was relegated for the second consecutive time, thus falling into the fourth tier (III Divisão). It still competed in the 2007–08 season, but due to serious financial problems, the senior football team was excluded from the championship and then was shut down in 2008, keeping the youth football department.

In 2011, F.C. Maia was officially dissolved. Meanwhile, in 2009, the phoenix club F.C. Maia Lidador had born in its place starting from Porto F.A. district divisions.

== Last seasons ==
| Season | Level | Division | Section | Place | Movements |
|---|---|---|---|---|---|
| 2000–01 | Tier 2 | Liga de Honra | | 4th | |
| 2001–02 | Tier 2 | Liga de Honra | | 9th | |
| 2002–03 | Tier 2 | Liga de Honra | | 9th | |
| 2003–04 | Tier 2 | Liga de Honra | | 5th | |
| 2004–05 | Tier 2 | Liga de Honra | | 8th | |
| 2005–06 | Tier 2 | Liga de Honra | | 18th | Relegated |
| 2006–07 | Tier 3 | Segunda Divisão | Zona Norte | 14th | Relegated |
| 2007–08 | Tier 4 | Terceira Divisão | Série B – 1st Phase | 14th | |
| 2007–08 | Tier 4 | Terceira Divisão | Série B1 – Relegation | 2nd | |
| 2008–09 | Tier 4 | Terceira Divisão | Excluded from competition | | |

== Historic ==
| | No. of participations | Titles |
|---|---|---|
| Seasons in 1st Division | 0 | |
| Seasons in 2nd Division | 11 | |
| Seasons in 2nd Division (Level 3) / II B | 8 | 1 |
| Seasons in 3rd Division | 2 | |
| Seasons in 3rd Division (Level 4) | 1 | |
| Taça de Portugal | 23 | |

== Achievements ==
- Segunda Divisão Série Norte: 1996–97
