= 2005–06 in Portuguese football =

The 2005–06 season in Portuguese football saw Porto, led by Co Adriaanse, clinch their 21st title and win the Taça de Portugal. Sporting CP secured second place, which gave them a direct entrance into the next season's UEFA Champions League. Benfica had a disappointing season, although they returned to the spotlight of European football with a good run in the Champions League, reaching the quarter-finals.

Braga and Nacional challenged Sporting CP, Benfica and Porto for a major part of the season. Nacional, in particular, broke up "Big Three" for most of the season, defeating Sporting 2–1 at home in a memorable victory before ultimately falling away towards the end of the season. Braga finished the season in fourth place and Nacional finished fifth on the table after having slipped all the way to seventh at one point. Two famous Portuguese clubs, Vitória de Guimarães and Belenenses, were relegated.

Also of note was the suspension of Benfica midfielder Nuno Assis after testing positive for a banned substance in a league match . This positive test has been challenged very aggressively by Benfica's management, as the tests seem to have failed to follow proper procedures , as 72 hours passed between the collection of the sample and the tests.

Early in the season, Benfica won the SuperCup Cândido de Oliveira in a match against previous cup winner Vitória de Setúbal.

In European club competitions, Benfica reached the quarter-finals of the Champions League after eliminating Manchester United in the group phase and title-holders Liverpool in the last-32, only to be eliminated in the quarter-finals by eventual Champions Barcelona. Meanwhile, Porto had a relatively poor European season, failing to qualify through the group stage and finishing fourth in their group, missing out in a spot in the 2005–06 UEFA Cup final phase. Sporting was eliminated in the third qualifying round of the Champions League by Udinese and, after demotion to qualification for the UEFA Cup, was eliminated at the hands of Halmstads BK. All Portuguese teams failed to qualify for the group stage of the UEFA Cup save for Vitória de Guimarães, which surpassed Wisła Kraków but failed to progress past the group stages.

In international football, the Portugal national team secured a place in Germany's 2006 FIFA World Cup, where they were grouped alongside Mexico, Iran and newcomer Angola.

== Honours ==
Competition	Winner
Liga	Porto
Taça de Portugal	Porto
Portuguese SuperCup	Benfica
Liga de Honra	Beira-Mar
Segunda Divisão	Trofense (A); Lousada (B); Oliveirense (C); Olivais e Moscavide (D)
Terceira Divisão	Maria da Fonte (A); Vila Meã (B); União Lamas (C); Eléctrico(D); Atlético CP (E); Estrela (F); Lusitânia (Azores)

== Liga ==
=== Promoted teams ===
These teams were promoted from the Liga de Honra at the start of the season:

- Paços de Ferreira (champion)
- Naval 1° de Maio (2nd placed)
- Estrela da Amadora (3rd placed)

=== Final standings ===
Pos	Team	Pld	W	D	L	GF	GA	GD	Pts	Qualification or relegation
1	Porto (C)	34	24	7	3	54	16	+38	79	Qualification to Champions League group stage
2	Sporting CP	34	22	6	6	50	24	+26	72	Qualification to Champions League group stage
3	Benfica	34	20	7	7	51	29	+22	67	Qualification to Champions League third qualifying round
4	Braga	34	17	7	10	38	22	+16	58	Qualification to UEFA Cup first round
5	Nacional	34	14	10	10	40	32	+8	52	Qualification to UEFA Cup first round
6	Boavista	34	12	14	8	37	29	+8	50	
7	União de Leiria	34	13	8	13	44	42	+2	47	
8	Vitória de Setúbal	34	14	4	16	28	33	−5	46	Qualification to UEFA Cup first round (Note: Since the Taça de Portugal winners Porto qualified for the Champions League, their place in the UEFA Cup went to Vitória de Setúbal, who were the Taça de Portugal runners-up.)
9	Estrela da Amadora	34	12	9	13	31	33	−2	45	
10	Marítimo	34	10	14	10	38	37	+1	44	
11	Paços de Ferreira	34	11	9	14	38	49	−11	42	
12	Gil Vicente (R)	34	11	7	16	37	42	−5	40	Relegation to Liga de Honra (Note: Gil Vicente fielded an ineligible player, Angolan forward Mateus. Due to this they lost the right to participate in the 2006–07 Primeira Liga which as a result meant Belenenses remained in the league)
13	Académica	34	10	9	15	37	48	−11	39	
14	Naval 1º de Maio	34	11	6	17	35	48	−13	39	
15	Belenenses	34	11	6	17	40	42	−2	39	Spared from relegation
16	Rio Ave (R)	34	8	10	16	34	53	−19	34	Relegation to Liga de Honra
17	Vitória de Guimarães (R)	34	8	10	16	28	41	−13	34	Relegation to Liga de Honra
18	Penafiel (R)	34	2	9	23	21	61	−40	15	Relegation to Liga de Honra

Source: Foradejogo
Rules for classification: 1) points; 2) head-to-head points; 3) head-to-head goal difference; 4) goal difference; 5) number of goals scored
(C) Champions; (R) Relegated

=== UEFA competitions and relegations ===
These teams were qualified for the UEFA competitions of 2006-07:

- UEFA Champions League
  - Champions Porto (group stage)
  - 2nd place Sporting CP (group stage)
  - 3rd place Benfica (third qualifying round)
- UEFA Cup
  - 4th place Braga (first round)
  - 5th place Nacional (first round)
  - Cup finalist Vitória de Setúbal

These teams were relegated to the League of Honour at the end of the season:

- Relegations
  - 12th place Gil Vicente (relegated in sport courts)
  - 16th place Rio Ave
  - 17th place Vitória de Guimarães
  - 18th place Penafiel

The SuperLiga will be reduced from 18 to 16 teams for 2006–07. To accommodate this, four teams were relegated from the SuperLiga, with only two promoted from the Liga da Honra.

=== Top scorers ===
- 1 Albert Meyong (Belenenses) 17
- 2 João Tomás (Braga) 15
- 2 Liédson (Sporting CP) 15
- 2 Nuno Gomes (Benfica) 15
- 5 André Pinto (Nacional) 14
- 6 Joeano (Académica) 13
- 7 Marek Saganowski (Vitória de Guimarães) 12
- 8 Alexandre Goulart (Nacional) 11
- 9 Gaúcho (Rio Ave) 10
- 9 Lucho González (Porto) 10

== UEFA competitions ==
=== Sporting CP ===
UEFA Champions League third qualifying round

1st leg	10 August 2005	Sporting CP 0–1 Udinese
2nd leg	23 August 2005	Udinese 3–2 Sporting CP

UEFA Cup first round

1st leg	15 September 2005	Halmstad BK 1–2 Sporting Clube de Portugal
2nd leg	29 September 2005	Sporting CP 2–3 Halmstad BK (a.e.t.)

=== Porto ===
UEFA Champions League group H

Match One	13 September 2005	Rangers 3–2 Porto
Match Two	28 September 2005	Porto 2–3 Artmedia Bratislava
Match Three	19 October 2005	Porto 2–0 Internazionale
Match Four	1 November 2005	Internazionale 2–1 Porto
Match Five	23 November 2005	Porto 1–1 Rangers
Match Six	6 December 2005	Artmedia Bratislava 0–0 Porto

=== Benfica ===
UEFA Champions League group D

Match One	14 September 2005	Benfica 1–0 Lille
Match Two	27 September 2005	Manchester United 2–1 Benfica
Match Three	18 October 2005	Villarreal 1–1 Benfica
Match Four	2 November 2005	Benfica 0–1 Villarreal
Match Five	22 November 2005	Lille 0–0 Benfica
Match Six	7 December 2005	Benfica 2–1 Manchester United

UEFA Champions League first knockout round

1st leg	21 February 2006	Benfica 1–0 Liverpool
2nd leg	8 March 2006	Liverpool 0–2 Benfica

UEFA Champions League quarter-finals

1st leg	28 March 2006	Benfica 0–0 Barcelona
2nd leg	5 April 2006	Barcelona 2–0 Benfica

=== Braga ===
UEFA Cup first round

1st leg	15 September 2005	Red Star Belgrade 0–0 Braga
2nd leg	29 September 2005	Braga 1–1 Red Star Belgrade

=== Vitória de Setúbal ===
UEFA Cup first round

1st leg	15 September 2005	Vitória de Setúbal 1–1 Sampdoria
2nd leg	29 September 2005	Sampdoria 1–0 Vitória de Setúbal

=== Vitória de Guimarães ===
UEFA Cup first round

1st leg	15 September 2005	Vitória de Guimarães 3–0 Wisła Kraków
2nd leg	29 September 2005	Wisła Kraków 0–1 Vitória de Guimarães

UEFA Cup group H

Match One	20 October 2005	Zenit Saint Petersburg 2–1 Vitória de Guimarães
Match Three	24 November 2005	Vitória de Guimarães 1–1 Bolton Wanderers
Match Four	1 December 2005	Sevilla 3–1 Vitória de Guimarães
Match Five	14 December 2005	Vitória de Guimarães 1–3 Beşiktaş

== Cup of Portugal ==
Porto won their 17th Portuguese Cup after beating Vitória de Setúbal) 1–0 on 14 May 2006.

=== Round of 16 to Final ===
Round of 16
1	Marítimo	3
3	Vila Meã	0
1	Porto	-
-	bye	-
2	Desportivo das Aves	1
1	Académica	2
1	Sporting CP	2
2B	Paredes	1
2B	Lixa	0
1	Vitória de Setúbal	2
1	Estrela da Amadora	0
1	Boavista	1
1	Benfica (pen.)	0 (5)
1	Nacional	0 (3)
1	Vitória de Guimarães	2
2B	Oliveirense	0

Quarter-Finals
1	Marítimo	1 (1)
1	Porto (a.e.t.)	1 (2)
1	Académica	0
1	Sporting CP	2
1	Vitória de Setúbal (aet)	1 (2)
1	Boavista	1 (1)
1	Benfica	0
1	Vitória de Guimarães	1

Semi-Finals
1	Porto (PEN)	1 (5)
1	Sporting CP	1 (4)
1	Vitória de Setúbal (PEN)	1 (3)
1	Vitória de Guimarães	1 (2)

Final
1	Porto	1
1	Vitória de Setúbal	0

== Liga de Honra ==
=== Promoted and relegated teams ===
These teams were relegated from the Primeira Liga at the start of the season:

- Gil Vicente (12th placed, relegated in sport courts)
- Moreirense (16th placed)
- Estoril (17th placed)
- Beira-Mar (18th placed)

These teams were promoted from the Portuguese Second Division B at the start of the season:

- FC Vizela (Northern Zone champion)
- Sporting Covilhã (Central Zone champion)
- FC Barreirense (Southern Zone champion)

=== Final standings ===
Pos	Team	Pld	W	D	L	GF	GA	GD	Pts	Promotion or relegation
1	Beira-Mar (C, P)	34	18	14	2	45	18	+27	68	Promotion to Primeira Liga
2	Desportivo das Aves (P)	34	18	10	6	47	30	+17	64	Promotion to Primeira Liga
3	Leixões	34	17	11	6	47	19	+28	62	
4	Varzim	34	13	13	8	47	39	+8	52	
5	Olhanense	34	13	13	8	41	28	+13	52	
6	Santa Clara	34	13	12	9	45	32	+13	51	
7	Gondomar	34	14	9	11	56	41	+15	51	
8	Chaves	34	13	11	10	40	36	+4	50	
9	Estoril	34	11	12	11	44	43	+1	45	
10	Feirense	34	12	8	14	44	44	0	44	
11	Vizela	34	11	11	12	42	48	−6	44	
12	Portimonense	34	10	13	11	36	36	0	43	
13	Moreirense (R)	34	11	9	14	36	37	−1	42	Relegation to Segunda Divisão
14	Sporting da Covilhã (R)	34	10	12	12	37	42	−5	42	Relegation to Segunda Divisão
15	Barreirense (R)	34	8	11	15	31	41	−10	35	Relegation to Segunda Divisão
16	Marco (R)	34	7	8	19	32	63	−31	29	Relegation to Segunda Divisão
17	Ovarense (R)	34	6	7	21	36	72	−36	25	Relegation to Segunda Divisão
18	Maia (R)	34	6	6	22	30	67	−37	24	Relegation to Segunda Divisão

(C) Champions; (P) Promoted; (R) Relegated

=== Promotions and relegations ===
These teams were promoted to the Liga betandwin.com at the end of the season:

- Promotions
  - Champions Beira-Mar
  - 2nd placed Desportivo das Aves

These teams were relegated to the Second Division at the end of the season:

- Relegations
  - 13th placed Moreirense
  - 14th placed Sporting Covilhã
  - 15th placed Barreirense
  - 16th placed Marco
  - 17th placed Ovarense
  - 18th placed Maia

=== Top scorers ===
Only players with at least 10 goals

Place	Scorer	Goals	Team
1.	(Brazil) Cássio	20	Maia/Chaves
1.	(Portugal) Nuno Sousa	20	Gondomar
3.	(Portugal) Bock	19	Vizela
4.	(Mozambique) Fumo	14	Gondomar
5.	(Brazil) Cícero	13	Varzim
5.	(Brazil) Roma	13	Beira-Mar
7.	(Brazil) Nei	12	Moreirense
7.	(Brazil) Djalmir	12	Feirense
9.	(Portugal) Ricardo Silva	11	Olhanense
10.	(Portugal) Basílio Almeida	10	Santa Clara
10.	(Brazil) Brasília	10	Leixões

== Second Division ==
=== Promoted and relegated teams ===
The organization of the Second Division was changed for the 2005-06 season. The name was changed from Second Division B to Second Division, and the Northern, Central and Southern zones were abolished to be replaced by another geographical scheme with 4 alphabetically named series.

Only one team was relegated from the League of Honour at the start of the season:

- 18th placed Espinho

16th placed Gondomar and 17th placed Chaves that would normally be relegated to the Second Division, were allowed to play again in the League of Honour, since 11th placed Felgueiras and 13th placed Alverca closed their football sections.

These teams were promoted from the Terceira Divisão at the start of the season:

- Serie A champions GDRC «Os Sandinenses»
- Serie A runners-up GD União Torcatense
- Serie B champions Aliados Lordelo F.C.
- Serie B runners-up FC Famalicão
- Serie C champions SL Nelas
- Serie C runners-up CF União de Coimbra
- Serie D champions AD Portomosense
- Serie D runners-up UD Rio Maior
- Serie E champions S.L. Benfica B
- Serie E runners-up Real Sport Clube
- Serie F champions Silves FC
- Serie F runner-up Imortal DC
- Serie Azores champions (and winner of the playoff) FC Madalena

At the end of the 2004-05 season, the winner of the Third Division Serie Azores had to a playoff with the worst placed Azorean team in the Second Division B Southern Zone. 13th placed SC Lusitânia lost the first leg 1-2 to Serie Azores champions FC Madalena, but won the second leg 1-0. Because the Portuguese system doesn't apply the away goal rule, the teams went to penalties, in which Madalena won 5-4.

Meanwhile, Académico de Viseu, that was scheduled to play in the 2005-06 season in the Second Division Series C, decided to quit early in the season, and was accordingly relegated to the district championships. Another entrance in the division was the reserve team Vitória FC "de Setúbal" B.

=== Final standings ===
==== Série A ====
Pos	Team	Pld	W	D	L	GF	GA	GD	Pts	Qualification or relegation
1	CD Trofense	26	15	7	4	44	22	+22	52	Championship Playoffs
2	União Funchal	26	13	6	7	28	17	+11	45	
3	AD Camacha	26	12	6	8	47	29	+18	42	
4	GD Ribeirão	26	11	8	7	18	15	+3	41	
5	AD Fafe	26	10	8	8	26	27	−1	38	
6	FC Famalicão	26	9	10	7	30	29	+1	37	
7	Os Sandinenses	26	9	10	7	25	24	+1	37	
8	CD Portosantense	26	9	8	9	21	22	−1	35	
9	SC Braga B	26	9	7	10	24	23	+1	34	
10	Lixa FC	26	10	4	12	24	30	−6	34	
11	SC Freamunde	26	8	9	9	25	20	+5	33	
12	CDA Valdevez	26	9	6	11	28	35	−7	33	Relegation to Terceira Divisão
13	Vilaverdense	26	7	3	16	26	42	−16	24	Relegation to Terceira Divisão
14	União Torcatense	26	3	4	19	18	49	−31	13	Relegation to Terceira Divisão

Source: Portugal – Table of Honor – soccerlibrary.free.fr (PDF)

==== Série B ====
Pos	Team	Pld	W	D	L	GF	GA	GD	Pts	Qualification or relegation
1	AD Lousada	26	15	6	5	39	22	+17	51	Championship Playoffs
2	SC Espinho	26	12	11	3	31	16	+15	47	
3	Dragões Sandinenses	26	13	6	7	39	24	+15	45	
4	União Paredes	26	11	6	9	33	31	+2	39	
5	Infesta FC	26	10	9	7	32	32	0	39	
6	FC Porto B	26	10	8	8	28	27	+1	38	
7	CD Ribeira Brava	26	9	9	8	30	33	−3	36	
8	SC Esmoriz	26	9	7	10	32	34	−2	34	
9	AD Pontassolense	26	10	2	14	34	32	+2	32	
10	Marítimo Funchal B	26	9	5	12	34	34	0	32	
11	Fiães SC	26	7	9	10	30	32	−2	30	
12	Aliados Lordelo	26	7	8	11	26	39	−13	29	Relegation to Terceira Divisão
13	FC Pedras Rubras	26	7	4	15	20	37	−17	25	Relegation to Terceira Divisão
14	AD Sanjoanense	26	4	8	14	25	40	−15	20	Relegation to Terceira Divisão

Source: Portugal – Table of Honor – soccerlibrary.free.fr (PDF)

==== Série C ====
Pos	Team	Pld	W	D	L	GF	GA	GD	Pts	Qualification or relegation
1	UD Oliveirense	26	17	5	4	52	26	+26	56	Championship Playoffs
2	CD Fátima	26	14	8	4	41	18	+23	50	
3	GD Tourizense	26	14	5	7	38	22	+16	47	
4	FC Pampilhosa	26	12	8	6	36	29	+7	44	
5	Abrantes FC	26	13	5	8	38	33	+5	44	
6	SL Nelas	26	9	10	7	32	28	+4	37	
7	SC Pombal	26	9	7	10	34	29	+5	34	
8	UD Rio Maior	26	8	10	8	32	32	0	34	
9	SC Penalva do Castelo	26	9	6	11	30	40	−10	33	
10	Oliveira do Bairro	26	6	12	8	34	35	−1	30	
11	AD Portomosense	26	5	12	9	26	27	−1	27	
12	Benfica Castelo Branco	26	5	9	12	26	42	−16	24	Relegation to Terceira Divisão
13	União Coimbra	26	6	3	17	24	51	−27	21	Relegation to Terceira Divisão
14	Oliveira do Hospital	26	2	6	18	22	53	−31	12	Relegation to Terceira Divisão

Source: Portugal – Table of Honor – soccerlibrary.free.fr (PDF)

==== Série D ====
Pos	Team	Pld	W	D	L	GF	GA	GD	Pts	Qualification or relegation
1	CD Olivais e Moscavide	30	15	9	6	41	24	+17	54	Championship Playoffs
2	Louletano DC	30	15	7	8	55	32	+23	52	
3	CD Pinhalnovense	30	15	7	8	35	26	+9	52	
4	Operário Açores	30	15	6	9	42	32	+10	51	
5	FC Madalena	30	15	5	10	32	35	−3	50	
6	Odivelas FC	30	15	4	11	39	35	+4	49	
7	CD Mafra	30	13	8	9	45	38	+7	47	
8	SCU Torreense	30	13	4	13	37	35	+2	43	
9	Imortal DC	30	12	6	12	50	38	+12	42	
10	União Micaelense	30	11	8	11	32	30	+2	41	
11	S.L. Benfica B	30	11	8	11	40	40	0	41	
12	RSC Queluz	30	12	5	13	38	40	−2	41	
13	Casa Pia AC	30	12	5	13	45	50	−5	41	Relegation to Terceira Divisão
14	Vitória Setúbal B	30	10	6	14	36	42	−6	36	Relegation to Terceira Divisão
15	Silves FC	30	5	6	19	34	58	−24	21	Relegation to Terceira Divisão
16	Oriental Lisboa	30	1	6	23	19	65	−46	9	Relegation to Terceira Divisão

Source: Portugal – Table of Honor – soccerlibrary.free.fr (PDF)

=== Promotion and relegation ===
According to the Portuguese Football Federation, only two teams will be promoted to the League of Honour at the end of the season. The champions of Series A will play their Series B counterparts in a playoff, and the same will happen for the champions of Series D and C. The winners will be promoted to the League of Honour.

- Lousada (B) vs. Trofense (A)
- Olivais e Moscavide (D) vs. Oliveirense (C)

Also according to the Federation, the last 4 of every Series will be relegated to the Third Division. And, if a reserve "B" team is relegated or quits, another additional team will be relegated to the Third Division.

- Relegations
  - Series A
    - 11th placed S.C. Freamunde
    - 12th placed C. Atlético de Valdevez
    - 13th placed Vilaverdense FC
    - 14th placed GD União Torcatense
  - Series B
    - 11th placed Fiães SC
    - 12th placed Aliados Lordelo F.C.
    - 13th placed FC Pedras Rubras
    - 14th placed A.D. Sanjoanense
  - Series C
    - 11th placed AD Portomosense
    - 12th placed Sport Benfica e Castelo Branco
    - 13th placed CF União de Coimbra
    - 14th placed F.C. Oliveira do Hospital
  - Series D
    - 12th placed Real Sport Clube
    - 13th placed Casa Pia AC
    - 14th placed Vitória FC "de Setúbal" B
    - 15th placed Silves FC
    - 16th placed Oriental de Lisboa

== Portugal national team ==
Date	Venue	Opponents	Score	Comp	Portugal scorers
August 17, 2005	Estádio de São Miguel, Ponta Delgada	Egypt	2–0	F	Fernando Meira, Hélder Postiga
September 3, 2005	Estádio Algarve, Faro-Loulé	Luxembourg	6–0	WCQ3	Jorge Andrade, Ricardo Carvalho, Pauleta (2), Simão (2)
September 7, 2005	Lokomotiv Stadium, Moscow	Russia	0–0	WCQ3	-
October 8, 2005	Estádio Municipal de Aveiro, Aveiro	Liechtenstein	2–1	WCQ3	Pauleta, Nuno Gomes
October 10, 2005	Estádio do Dragão, Porto	Latvia	3–0	WCQ3	Pauleta (2), Hugo Viana
November 12, 2005	Estádio Cidade de Coimbra, Coimbra	Croatia	2–0	F	Petit, Pauleta
November 15, 2005	Windsor Park, Belfast	Northern Ireland	1–1	F	Own goal
March 1, 2006	LTU arena, Düsseldorf	Saudi Arabia	3–0	F	Cristiano Ronaldo (2), Maniche

KEY: WCQ3 = World Cup Qualification match - Group 3; F = Friendly
