= 2009–10 Liga de Honra =

76thseason of second-tier football league in Portugal

Liga de Honra
- Season: 2009–10
- Champions: Beira-Mar
- Promoted: Beira-Mar; Portimonense
- Relegated: Chaves; Carregado
- Matches: 240
- Goals: 569 (2.37 per match)
- Top goalscorer: Reguila (15)
- Biggest away win: Carregado 0–3 Penafiel

The 2009–10 Liga de Honra season (also known as Liga Vitalis due to sponsorship reasons) was the 20th season of the second-tier football in Portugal. It began on 13 August 2009 and ended on 9 May 2010. Olhanense were the defending champions.

== Teams ==
Trofense were relegated to the Liga de Honra after finishing 16th and last in the Portuguese Liga 2008–09 season. Trofense were to be accompanied by Belenenses, who finished in 15th place. Belenenses were ending a ten-year stretch in the Portuguese top-level league, while Trofense returned to the Liga da Honra after just one year in the top flight.

However, Estrela de Amadora, who finished in 11th place, were instead relegated to the Liga Vitalis for economic problems. The club was eventually relegated to the Second Division, the third-tier of Portuguese football due to the same problems, alongside Vizela, who had finished 10th last season but were relegated due to the Apito Dourado scandal.

Due to those relegations, Boavista and Gondomar, the 15th and 16th teams, respectively, should have remained in the Liga de Honra but both were still relegated due to economic difficulties for Boavista and involvement in the Apito Dourado case for Gondomar. To make up for the loss of four teams (instead of the regular two), Penafiel and Carregado, losers of the previous year's Second Division promotion play-offs, were invited to the Liga de Honra.

Location of teams in Liga Vitalis 2009–10
Location of teams in Liga Vitalis 2009–10

=== Stadia and locations ===
Club	City	Stadium	Capacity	2008 Season
Beira-Mar	Aveiro	Estádio Municipal de Aveiro	30,127	12th in Liga Vitalis
Carregado	Carregado	Campo Lacerda Pinto Barreiros	1,000	II Division runner-up
Chaves	Chaves	Estádio Municipal de Chaves	22,000	II Division playoff
Covilhã	Covilhã	Complexo Desportivo da Covilhã	3,000	7th in Liga Vitalis
Desportivo das Aves	Vila das Aves	Estádio do CD das Aves	10,250	11th in Liga Vitalis
Estoril Praia	Estoril	Estádio António Coimbra da Mota	8,000	4th in Liga Vitalis
Fátima	Fátima	Estádio Municipal de Fátima	1,545	II Division champion
Feirense	Santa Maria da Feira	Estádio Marcolino de Castro	4,667	5th in Liga Vitalis
Freamunde	Freamunde	Complexo Desportivo do SC Freamunde	5,000	6th in Liga Vitalis
Gil Vicente	Barcelos	Estádio Cidade de Barcelos	12,374	9th in Liga Vitalis
Oliveirense	Oliveira de Azeméis	Estádio Carlos Osório	9,100	14th in Liga Vitalis
Penafiel	Penafiel	Estádio Municipal 25 de Abril	7,000	II Division playoff
Portimonense	Portimão	Estádio Municipal de Portimão	9,544	13th in Liga Vitalis
Santa Clara	Ponta Delgada	Estádio de São Miguel	15,277	3rd in Liga Vitalis
Trofense	Trofa	Estádio do Clube Desportivo Trofense	3,164	16th in Liga Sagres
Varzim	Póvoa de Varzim	Estádio do Varzim SC	11,000	8th in Liga Vitalis

== League table ==
Pos	Team	Pld	W	D	L	GF	GA	GD	Pts	Promotion or relegation
1	Beira-Mar (C, P)	30	16	6	8	44	30	+14	54 (Note: BEM 2–0 PRM; PRM 2–1 BEM)	Promotion to Primeira Liga
2	Portimonense (P)	30	16	6	8	43	34	+9	54	Promotion to Primeira Liga
3	Feirense	30	14	10	6	37	24	+13	52	
4	Santa Clara	30	13	12	5	45	29	+16	51	
5	Oliveirense	30	14	7	9	38	27	+11	49	
6	Trofense	30	13	6	11	44	45	−1	45	
7	Penafiel	30	10	11	9	35	34	+1	41	
8	Fátima	30	8	14	8	31	31	0	38	
9	Desportivo das Aves	30	9	11	10	33	33	0	38	
10	Gil Vicente	30	9	11	10	36	32	+4	38	
11	Estoril	30	7	14	9	26	29	−3	35 (Note: FRM 0–2 ESP; ESP 0–0 FRM)	
12	Freamunde	30	9	8	13	43	50	−7	35	
13	Varzim	30	6	13	11	25	38	−13	31	
14	Sporting da Covilhã	30	7	9	14	35	49	−14	30	
15	Chaves (R)	30	6	10	14	28	37	−9	28	Relegation to Segunda Divisão
16	Carregado (R)	30	6	6	18	26	47	−21	24	Relegation to Segunda Divisão

Source: Liga Vitalis (Liga Honra)
Rules for classification: 1) points; 2) head-to-head points; 3) head-to-head goal difference; 4) head-to-head goals scored; 5) goal difference; 6) number of goals scored.
(C) Champions; (P) Promoted; (R) Relegated

== Results ==
Home \ Away	BEM	CAR	CHA	DAV	ESP	FAT	FEI	FRM	GVI	OLI	PEN	PTM	STC	SCO	TRO	VAR
Beira-Mar		1–0	2–1	3–2	3–1	0–1	1–0	1–3	2–1	1–0	1–2	2–0	1–1	0–1	1–2	3–0
Carregado	0–2		1–2	0–0	1–2	1–1	0–1	3–2	1–0	4–1	0–3	1–3	1–2	1–1	2–3	3–2
Chaves	1–1	2–0		0–1	1–1	0–1	0–1	1–1	1–1	0–0	2–0	1–1	0–3	3–1	1–1	0–1
Desportivo das Aves	1–3	2–1	2–2		0–1	0–1	1–1	1–2	2–2	2–1	3–2	1–1	0–0	3–0	1–0	2–0
Estoril Praia	2–0	1–1	2–2	1–0		0–1	1–2	0–0	0–2	0–1	0–0	1–3	0–0	1–0	1–1	1–1
Fátima	1–2	1–2	0–0	1–0	1–1		1–0	1–1	0–0	1–1	2–2	0–1	2–5	3–0	2–1	0–0
Feirense	0–2	1–0	1–0	1–0	1–1	1–1		1–1	0–1	2–1	1–1	2–1	2–1	3–2	3–0	4–0
Freamunde	1–2	3–0	2–0	0–0	0–2	1–1	1–2		3–2	1–2	1–3	0–3	1–2	3–2	2–3	2–1
Gil Vicente	1–1	0–1	0–3	0–2	0–2	1–1	1–1	1–1		1–0	3–1	0–2	0–0	3–0	4–0	1–2
Oliveirense	2–1	3–0	1–3	3–1	0–0	1–0	0–0	2–1	1–1		2–0	0–1	1–0	3–0	3–1	3–0
Penafiel	0–2	1–1	2–0	1–1	1–0	2–1	1–1	2–3	0–0	0–2		1–0	2–2	1–0	0–1	0–0
Portimonense	2–1	1–0	2–1	1–1	2–1	3–3	1–0	1–0	0–3	3–1	1–3		0–0	2–0	1–3	3–2
Santa Clara	1–1	1–0	3–0	2–0	1–1	1–0	1–1	3–2	0–0	1–2	0–1	3–0		1–1	3–1	2–1
Sporting da Covilhã	2–2	1–0	2–0	1–2	3–1	2–2	1–1	2–3	1–2	1–1	2–1	3–1	2–2		2–1	0–0
Trofense	0–1	3–0	2–1	2–2	1–1	1–0	0–2	4–0	2–4	1–0	0–0	0–3	5–2	2–2		2–1
Varzim	1–1	1–1	1–0	0–0	0–0	1–1	2–1	2–2	2–1	0–0	2–2	0–0	1–2	1–0	0–1	

Source: Liga Vitalis (Liga Honra)
Legend: Blue = home team win; Yellow = draw; Red = away team win.

== Top goalscorers ==
Position	Player	Club	Goals
1	(Portugal) Reguila	Trofense	15
2	(Portugal) João Silva	Desportivo das Aves	14
3	(Brazil) Leandro Tatu	Santa Clara	13
4	(Brazil) Michel	Penafiel	11
5	(Brazil) Cascavel	Freamunde	10
5	(Portugal) Carlos Pinto	Chaves	10
5	(Brazil) Roberto Alcântara	Feirense	10
5	(Portugal) Miguel Rosa	Carregado	10
9	(Portugal) Nuno Sousa	Fátima	8
9	(Portugal) Artur	Beira-Mar	8
9	(Portugal) Cícero	Oliveirense	8

Updated to games played on 2 May 2010
Source: Liga Vitalis – Match Statistics (in Portuguese)
