= Cascavel (footballer) =

Portuguese footballer

Personal information
- Full name: Guilherme Capra Bacinello
- Date of birth: 3 October 1986 (age 40)
- Place of birth: Guimarães, Portugal
- Height: 1.84 m (6 ft 1/2 in)
- Position: Striker

Youth career
- 2003–2005: Vitória Guimarães

Senior career*
Years	Team	Apps	(Gls)
2005–2006	Vitória Guimarães	0	(0)
2005–2006	→ Torcatense (loan)	25	(5)
2006	Bragança	11	(4)
2007	Vila Meã	14	(9)
2007–2009	Trofense	4	(0)
2008	→ Moreirense (loan)	15	(9)
2008–2009	→ Freamunde (loan)	19	(8)
2009–2010	Freamunde	23	(11)
2010–2011	Penafiel	25	(6)
2011–2012	AEP	13	(4)
Total		149	(56)
- * Club domestic league appearances and goals

Guilherme Capra Bacinello (born 3 October 1986), commonly known as Cascavel, is a Portuguese former professional footballer who played as a striker.

== Club career ==
A product of hometown Vitória de Guimarães's youth system, Guimarães-born Cascavel made his senior debut with G.D. União Torcatense in the third division, on loan. During his spell at the neighbouring side, he was involved in a lawsuit concerning the acquisition of his Portuguese nationality after his alleged irregular use in three matches. His team was relegated at the end of the season after ranking last, and his parent club also released him, with the player going on to resume his career in the same tier.

Cascavel signed with C.D. Trofense of the Segunda Liga ahead of the 2007–08 campaign, appearing rarely (only six competitive matches) as they achieved a first-ever Primeira Liga promotion. In January 2008, he returned to division three and joined Moreirense F.C. on loan.

On 3 August 2009, having already served a loan spell with the club, Cascavel moved to S.C. Freamunde on a permanent basis. He ranked fifth in the scoring charts, as they narrowly escaped relegation from the second division.

For 2010–11, Cascavel continued in the second tier, signing a one-year deal with F.C. Penafiel. In June 2011 he moved to Cyprus with AEP Paphos FC but, on 10 January of the following year, his contract was terminated by mutual consent.

== Personal life ==
Cascavel's father, Paulo Roberto, also nicknamed Cascavel, was also a footballer and a striker. He too played several seasons in Portugal, most notably with Guimarães and Sporting CP.
