= 2007–08 Liga de Honra =

74th season of second-tier football league in Portugal

Liga de Honra
- Season: 2007–08
- Champions: Trofense
- Promoted: Trofense; Rio Ave
- Relegated: Penafiel; Fátima

The 2007–08 Liga de Honra season was the 18th season of the competition and the 74th season of recognised second-tier football in Portugal. The season was started on 18 August 2007. The fixtures (or schedule of games to be played) were announced on 12 July 2007.

Fátima and Freamunde were promoted to the Liga Vitalis.

The first goalscorer of the season was Tatu, who scored a 4th-minute goal for Desportivo das Aves against Olhanense in, one of the four games, the kick-off that ended 1–2 for Olhanense. The first red card of the season was given to Desportivo das Aves' Sérgio Nunes in the same game.

== Teams ==
Club	Stadium, City	2006-2007 season	Manager
Sport Clube Beira-Mar	Estádio Municipal de Aveiro, Aveiro	15th in BWINLIGA (relegated)	Rogério Gonçalves
Grupo Desportivo Estoril-Praia	Estádio António Coimbra da Mota, Estoril	10th in 2006–07 Liga de Honra	Tulipa
Clube Desportivo das Aves	Estádio do CD das Aves, Vila das Aves	16th in BWINLIGA (relegated)	Manuel Gonçalves Gomes
Clube Desportivo de Fátima	Estádio Municipal de Fátima, Fátima	2nd in Portuguese Second Division (promoted)	Paulo Torres
Clube Desportivo Feirense	Estádio Marcolino de Castro, Santa Maria da Feira	6th in 2006–07 Liga de Honra	Henrique Nunes
Sport Clube Freamunde	Complexo Desportivo do SC Freamunde, Freamunde	Portuguese Second Division (promoted)	Jorge Regadas
Gil Vicente Futebol Clube	Estádio Cidade de Barcelos, Barcelos	12th in 2006–07 Liga de Honra	Paulo Alves
Gondomar Sport Clube	Estádio de São Miguel (Gondomar), Gondomar	5th in 2006–07 Liga de Honra	Nicolau Vaqueiro
Sporting Clube Olhanense	Estádio José Arcanjo, Olhão	9th in 2006–07 Liga de Honra	Álvaro Magalhães
Futebol Clube Penafiel	Estádio Municipal 25 de Abril, Penafiel	8th in 2006–07 Liga de Honra	António Sousa
Portimonense Sporting Clube	Estádio do Portimonense, Portimão	14th in 2006–07 Liga de Honra	Vítor Pontes
Rio Ave Futebol Clube	Estádio do Rio Ave FC, Vila do Conde	3rd in 2006–07 Liga de Honra	João Eusébio
Clube Desportivo Santa Clara	Estádio de São Miguel (Ponta Delgada), Açores	4th in 2006–07 Liga de Honra	Paulo Brito
Clube Desportivo Trofense	Estádio do Clube Desportivo Trofense, Trofa	11th in 2006–07 Liga de Honra	Daniel António Lopes Ramos
Varzim Sport Clube	Estádio do Varzim Sport Club, Póvoa de Varzim	7th in 2006–07 Liga de Honra	Diamantino Miranda
Futebol Clube de Vizela	Estádio do Futebol Clube de Vizela, Vizela	13th in 2006–07 Liga de Honra	Manuel Correia

== Final standings ==
Pos	Team	Pld	W	D	L	GF	GA	GD	Pts	Promotion or relegation
1	Trofense (C, P)	30	13	13	4	35	22	+13	52	Promotion to Primeira Liga
2	Rio Ave (P)	30	13	12	5	38	26	+12	51	Promotion to Primeira Liga
3	Vizela	30	13	11	6	40	22	+18	50	
4	Gil Vicente	30	13	11	6	43	34	+9	50	
5	Olhanense	30	12	9	9	33	33	0	45	
6	Beira-Mar	30	10	12	8	30	32	−2	42	
7	Estoril	30	11	8	11	41	38	+3	41	
8	Desportivo das Aves	30	10	9	11	43	39	+4	39	
9	Varzim	30	9	11	10	29	27	+2	38	
10	Santa Clara	30	10	7	13	31	50	−19	37	
11	Portimonense	30	8	13	9	26	30	−4	37	
12	Gondomar	30	8	11	11	37	37	0	35	
13	Freamunde	30	9	8	13	42	49	−7	35	
14	Feirense	30	8	9	13	25	27	−2	33	
15	Penafiel (R)	30	7	8	15	28	39	−11	29	Relegation to Segunda Divisão
16	Fátima (R)	30	5	10	15	25	41	−16	25	Relegation to Segunda Divisão

(C) Champions; (P) Promoted; (R) Relegated

== Results ==
Home \ Away	BEM	EST	DAV	FÁT	FEI	FRE	GVI	GON	OLH	PEN	PTM	RAV	STC	TRO	VAR	VIZ
Beira-Mar		3–2	1–0	2–1	0–0	1–1	0–0	1–1	2–0	1–0	2–0	1–1	1–2	1–0	1–1	0–3
Estoril	0–1		2–2	2–2	0–1	3–2	2–0	2–0	1–2	2–2	0–1	1–2	5–1	1–1	1–0	2–1
Desportivo das Aves	1–1	2–3		1–0	1–1	3–0	1–1	1–0	1–2	1–2	2–0	0–0	3–1	1–1	2–1	2–1
Fátima	2–2	0–1	2–1		0–2	1–1	1–1	3–2	0–1	0–3	0–3	1–1	1–0	2–0	1–2	1–0
Feirense	0–1	2–1	2–0	2–2		0–1	0–1	2–0	0–1	1–1	0–2	1–1	0–1	0–1	3–0	1–2
Freamunde	0–1	1–3	2–4	2–1	1–1		1–2	0–0	3–1	3–1	2–1	4–4	3–1	0–2	1–1	1–1
Gil Vicente	3–2	3–0	1–4	3–2	1–0	1–0		4–3	0–0	2–0	2–1	1–1	2–1	1–1	1–1	1–1
Gondomar	1–0	1–0	1–1	1–1	2–2	3–2	1–1		0–1	2–0	0–0	2–3	4–0	1–2	2–2	0–0
Olhanense	0–0	1–2	2–1	1–1	2–0	0–1	2–2	0–1		3–1	0–1	0–3	2–2	1–0	2–1	1–0
Penafiel	1–0	1–2	2–2	2–0	0–1	2–2	2–3	0–2	0–0		1–0	0–1	1–2	0–1	0–0	0–2
Portimonense	2–1	2–2	0–0	0–0	1–1	0–2	0–0	1–0	2–1	1–1		2–1	1–1	2–2	0–4	1–1
Rio Ave	1–1	1–0	2–1	1–0	0–1	3–1	1–0	2–2	1–1	4–1	0–0		1–0	1–1	0–1	1–0
Santa Clara	1–1	1–1	2–3	0–0	1–0	2–1	1–4	1–0	2–3	0–3	2–1	1–0		0–4	1–0	1–1
Trofense	1–1	2–0	2–1	1–0	2–1	1–2	1–0	1–1	2–2	1–0	1–0	0–0	1–1		1–0	0–0
Varzim	2–0	0–0	2–1	2–0	0–0	2–0	2–1	2–3	0–0	0–1	0–0	0–1	3–1	0–0		0–0
Vizela	5–1	0–0	2–0	1–0	1–0	3–2	2–1	2–1	3–1	0–0	1–1	2–0	0–1	2–2	3–0	

Legend: Blue = home team win; Yellow = draw; Red = away team win.
