= Leandro Pimenta =

Portuguese footballer (born 1990)

Personal information
- Full name: Leandro António Coelho Pimenta
- Date of birth: 9 July 1990 (age 36)
- Place of birth: Albufeira, Portugal
- Height: 1.79 m (5 ft 10 in)
- Position: Midfielder

Team information
- Current team: Imortal

Youth career
- 1999–2005: Imortal
- 2005–2009: Benfica

Senior career*
Years	Team	Apps	(Gls)
2009–2013	Benfica	0	(0)
2009–2010	→ Beira-Mar (loan)	10	(0)
2010–2011	→ Fátima (loan)	12	(0)
2011–2012	→ Atlético (loan)	27	(3)
2012–2013	Benfica B	34	(1)
2013–2015	Gil Vicente	14	(0)
2016–2017	Freamunde	30	(2)
2017–2018	Fafe	13	(1)
2019–2020	Covilhã	6	(0)
2021–2022	Imortal	11	(0)
2022–2025	Ferreiras	53	(6)
2025–	Imortal	24	(6)

International career
2005	Portugal U16	3	(0)
2006–2007	Portugal U17	13	(0)
2007–2008	Portugal U18	9	(0)
2008–2009	Portugal U19	11	(1)
2010	Portugal U20	5	(0)
2011–2012	Portugal U21	2	(0)
- * Club domestic league appearances and goals as of 00:55, 28 August 2026 (UTC)

Leandro António Coelho Pimenta (born 9 July 1990) is a Portuguese professional footballer who plays as a midfielder for Imortal.

== Club career ==
Born in Albufeira, Algarve, Pimenta joined S.L. Benfica's academy at the age of 15. He spent his first three seasons as a senior on loan in the Segunda Liga, representing in quick succession S.C. Beira-Mar, C.D. Fátima and Atlético Clube de Portugal. He scored his first goal as a professional while at the service of the latter club, the only in a 1–0 away win against Portimonense S.C. on 5 November 2011.

Pimenta returned to Benfica for the 2012–13 season, as part of the newly created reserve team who competed in the second division. On 11 December 2012, he renewed his contract until 2016 with a buyout clause of €30 million.

On 17 July 2013, Pimenta signed a three-year deal with Gil Vicente FC. He made his debut in the Primeira Liga on 18 August, starting the 2–0 home victory over Académica de Coimbra.

Pimenta returned to the second tier in January 2016, joining S.C. Freamunde as of 1 July. On 31 January 2019, he moved to S.C. Covilhã of the same league from lowly AD Fafe.

== International career ==
Pimenta won the first of two caps for Portugal at under-21 level on 9 August 2011, coming on as a late substitute in a 1–1 friendly draw with Slovakia held in Estoril.

== Honours ==
Beira-Mar

- Segunda Liga: 2009–10
