= Huguinho =

Huguinho is a diminutive nickname for the name Hugo. It may refer to:

- Huguinho (footballer, born 1988), Portuguese football defender
- Huguinho (footballer, born 2007), Brazilian football midfielder
