= Matías Morales =

Argentine professional footballer

Personal information
- Full name: Matías Omar Morales
- Date of birth: 5 July 1991 (age 35)
- Place of birth: Quilmes, Argentina
- Height: 1.82 m (6 ft 0 in)
- Position: Midfielder

Youth career
- Quilmes

Senior career*
Years	Team	Apps	(Gls)
2012–2016	Quilmes	41	(1)
2016–2017	Almagro	23	(1)
2017–2018	Berazategui	35	(4)
2018–2019	Atlanta	9	(0)
2019	Olimpia	3	(0)
2020–2022	Excursionistas	58	(10)
2022–2023	Nissa		
- * Club domestic league appearances and goals

Matías Omar Morales (born 5 July 1991) is an Argentine professional footballer who plays as a midfielder.

== Career ==
Morales got his career underway with Quilmes. His first appearance in senior football arrived in the Copa Argentina against Atlanta, as he played the final twenty-three minutes of a win away from home after replacing Sergio Hipperdinger. He featured again in the cup, versus Ferrocarril Midland, before appearing in the Primera División for the first time in May 2013 during a loss to Vélez Sarsfield. In total, Morales played forty-one times in the top-flight; also scoring once in a fixture with Banfield in 2016. Morales spent the 2016–17 season in Primera B Nacional with Almagro, prior to playing in Primera C Metropolitana for Berazategui in 2017–18.

Atlanta became Morales' fourth senior team on 30 June 2018. He made his debut after coming off the bench in a 4–0 victory over Tristán Suárez on 18 August, with his first start arriving in September versus Acassuso. June 2019 saw Morales, off a promotion with Atlanta, move abroad for the first time, signing with Olimpia of Honduras' Liga Nacional. He appeared in league matches with Platense, Real de Minas and Real Sociedad as they won the Apertura stage, as well as making three appearances in the CONCACAF League, prior to departing at the end of December.

In early December 2020, Morales signed with Excursionistas. In July 2023, Morales switched to the Italian Eccellenza club SSD Nissa FC.

== Career statistics ==
As of 21 October 2020.

Appearances and goals by club, season and competition
Club	Season	League			Cup		League Cup		Continental		Other		Total	
Club	Season	Division	Apps	Goals	Apps	Goals	Apps	Goals	Apps	Goals	Apps	Goals	Apps	Goals
Quilmes	2011–12	Primera B Nacional	0	0	1	0	—		—		0	0	1	0
Quilmes	2012–13	Primera División	2	0	1	0	—		—		0	0	3	0
Quilmes	2013–14	Primera División	18	0	0	0	—		—		0	0	18	0
Quilmes	2014	Primera División	4	0	0	0	—		—		0	0	4	0
Quilmes	2015	Primera División	2	0	0	0	—		—		1 (Note: Appearance(s) in the Primera División play-offs)	0	13	0
Quilmes	2016	Primera División	5	1	0	0	—		—		0	0	5	1
Quilmes	Total		41	1	2	0	—		—		1	0	44	1
Almagro	2016–17	Primera B Nacional	23	1	1	0	—		—		0	0	24	1
Berazategui	2017–18	Primera C Metropolitana	35	4	0	0	—		—		0	0	35	4
Atlanta	2018–19	Primera B Metropolitana	9	0	1	0	—		—		0	0	10	0
Olimpia	2019–20	Liga Nacional	3	0	0	0	—		3 (Note: Appearance(s) in the CONCACAF League)	0	0	0	6	0
Career total			112	6	4	0	—		3	0	0	0	119	6
