= Fábio Vieira =

Fábio Vieira may refer to:

- Fábio Vieira (footballer, born 1991), Portuguese footballer
- Fábio Vieira (footballer, born 2000), Portuguese footballer
