= Rodolfo Lourenço =

Portuguese footballer (born 1991)

Personal information
- Full name: Rodolfo Rafael Dias Lourenço
- Date of birth: 15 July 1991 (age 35)
- Place of birth: Miranda do Corvo, Portugal
- Height: 1.70 m (5 ft 7 in)
- Position: Defender

Youth career
- 2003–2004: ADFP Miranda do Corvo
- 2004–2006: Porto
- 2006–2010: Académica de Coimbra

Senior career*
Years	Team	Apps	(Gls)
2010–2011	Académica de Coimbra	0	(0)
2010–2011	→ Tourizense (loan)	1	(0)
2011–2012	Sertanense	22	(0)
2012–2015	Nogueirense	81	(2)
2015–2016	Olhanense	43	(0)
2016–2017	Freamunde	23	(0)
2017–2018	Sourense	21	(0)
2018–2019	Condeixa	11	(0)
- * Club domestic league appearances and goals as of 1 August 2019

Rodolfo Rafael Dias Lourenço (born 15 July 1991) is a retired Portuguese footballer who played as a defender.

== Football career ==
Rodolfo started his career at Sertanense, where he played a single season in the Campeanato de Portugal before transferring on a free deal to Associação Desportiva Nogueirense on 30 July 2012. He stayed at Nogueirense for 3 years, making over 75 appearances for the club between 2012 and 2015. On 30 July 2012 he made a free transfer to Segunda liga side S.C. Olhanense, for who he currently applies his trade. He made his debut for Olhanense in a 2015–16 Taça da Liga match versus F.C. Penafiel, which they ended up losing 2–0. He has been a regular starter in his initial season for S.C. Olhanense.

== Personal ==
He is the younger brother of Fausto Lourenço.
