= Jorge Regadas =

Portuguese football manager and former player

Ernesto Jorge Taipas Regadas (born 23 January 1957) is a Portuguese retired footballer who played as a midfielder, and is a manager.

His career was closely associated with Freamunde, as both a player and manager. He coached the club in four different decades.

== Playing career ==
Born in Porto, Regadas started playing football with S.C. Freamunde (1974–77), competing in the lower leagues. From then onwards he spent the remainder of his career – with the exception of the 1984–85 season – in the second division, representing Aliados Lordelo FC, F.C. Penafiel, F.C. Paços de Ferreira and Moreirense FC.

Regadas retired in June 1988 at the age of 31, after a spell with his first club.

== Coaching career ==
Regadas began working as a coach shortly after retiring, starting with precisely Freamunde where he had other spells in the 90s. His first experience at the professional level came during the 1998–99 campaign, being in charge of F.C. Penafiel for 17 matches (five wins, five draws and seven losses for an eventual ninth position).

In the following years, Regadas managed in every level in Portuguese football except for the Primeira Liga, working with C.D. Trofense, F.C. Tirsense, Gondomar SC, F.C. Maia and F.C. Marco. Early into 2006–07 he returned to Freamunde, leading the side to the division three national championship and the subsequent promotion.

From 2007 to 2010, Regadas managed to always lead his main club to safety – this included a best-ever sixth place in the 2008–09 season. Subsequently, he joined G.D. Chaves in the third tier, leaving his post after less than two months over a disagreement with the board of directors.

From 15 January 2011 and for roughly one year, Regadas acted as director of football to Romania's CFR Cluj. He subsequently returned to manager duties in his country, with former sides Chaves and Freamunde, not being able to prevent second division relegation with the latter.

During his career, Regadas was no stranger to controversy, often being involved in spats with directors, organizations and referees.
