= Leandro Albano =

Portuguese footballer (born 1992)

Personal information
- Full name: Leandro Micael Gomes Albano
- Date of birth: 26 May 1992 (age 34)
- Place of birth: Sintra, Portugal
- Height: 1.81 m (5 ft 11 in)
- Position: Right-back

Team information
- Current team: Pedras Salgadas

Youth career
- 2001–2003: Águias de Camarate
- 2004–2011: Sporting CP

Senior career*
Years	Team	Apps	(Gls)
2011–2012	Mafra	26	(0)
2012–2014	Braga B	23	(1)
2014–2015	Atlético CP	28	(0)
2015–2017	Freamunde	19	(0)
2017–2019	Trofense	52	(2)
2019–2020	AD Oliveirense	19	(0)
2020–	Pedras Salgadas	21	(0)
- * Club domestic league appearances and goals as of 5 September 2021

Leandro Micael Gomes Albano (born 26 May 1992) is a Portuguese footballer who plays for Pedras Salgadas as a right-back.

== Career ==
Born in Lisbon, Albano was formed at Sporting's youth system. He was not given a professional contract, so he signed with Mafra in August 2011. The next season, he moved to Braga, where he made his professional debut at 7 October 2012 in a match against Penafiel. After two seasons, he moved back to Lisbon, joining Atletico CP.
