= Miranda do Corvo =

- Municipality
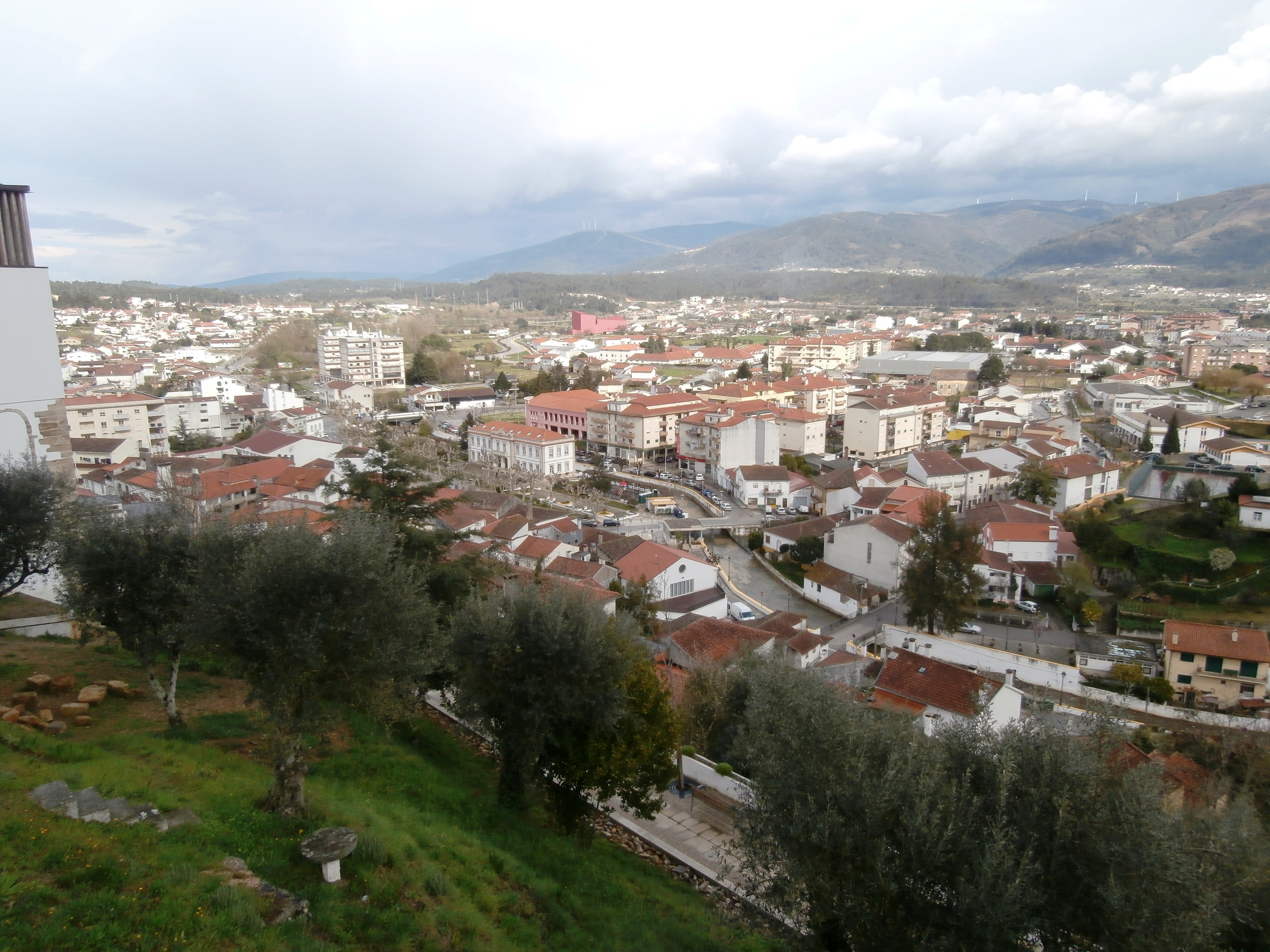
- A view of Miranda do Corvo from the Alto do Calvário

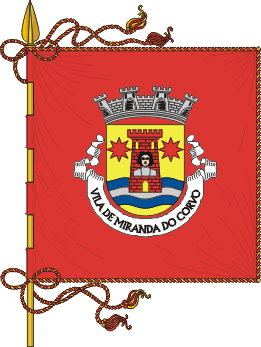
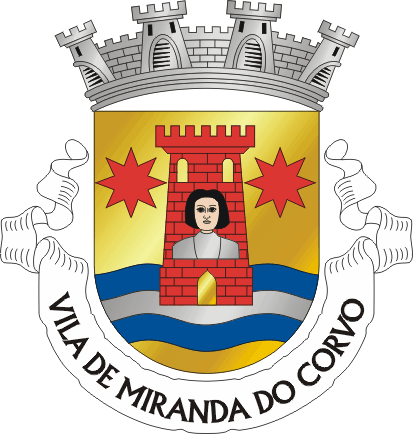
- Flag Coat of arms
- Interactive map of Miranda do Corvo
- Location in Portugal
- Coordinates: 40°06′N 8°20′W
- Country: Portugal
- Region: Centro
- Intermunic. comm.: Região de Coimbra
- District: Coimbra
- Parishes: 4

Area
  - Total: 126.38 km^{2} (48.80 sq mi)

Population (2011)
  - Total: 13,098
  - Density: 103.64/km^{2} (268.43/sq mi)
- Time zone: UTC+00:00 (WET)
  - Summer (DST): UTC+01:00 (WEST)
- Website: www.cm-mirandadocorvo.pt

Miranda do Corvo (Portuguese pronunciation: [miˈɾɐ̃dɐ ðu ˈkoɾvu]), officially the Town of Miranda do Corvo (Portuguese: Vila de Miranda do Corvo), is a town and a municipality in the Portuguese district of Coimbra, with an area of 126.38 square kilometres (48.80 mi^{2}) and 2011 population of 13,098 inhabitants.

== History ==
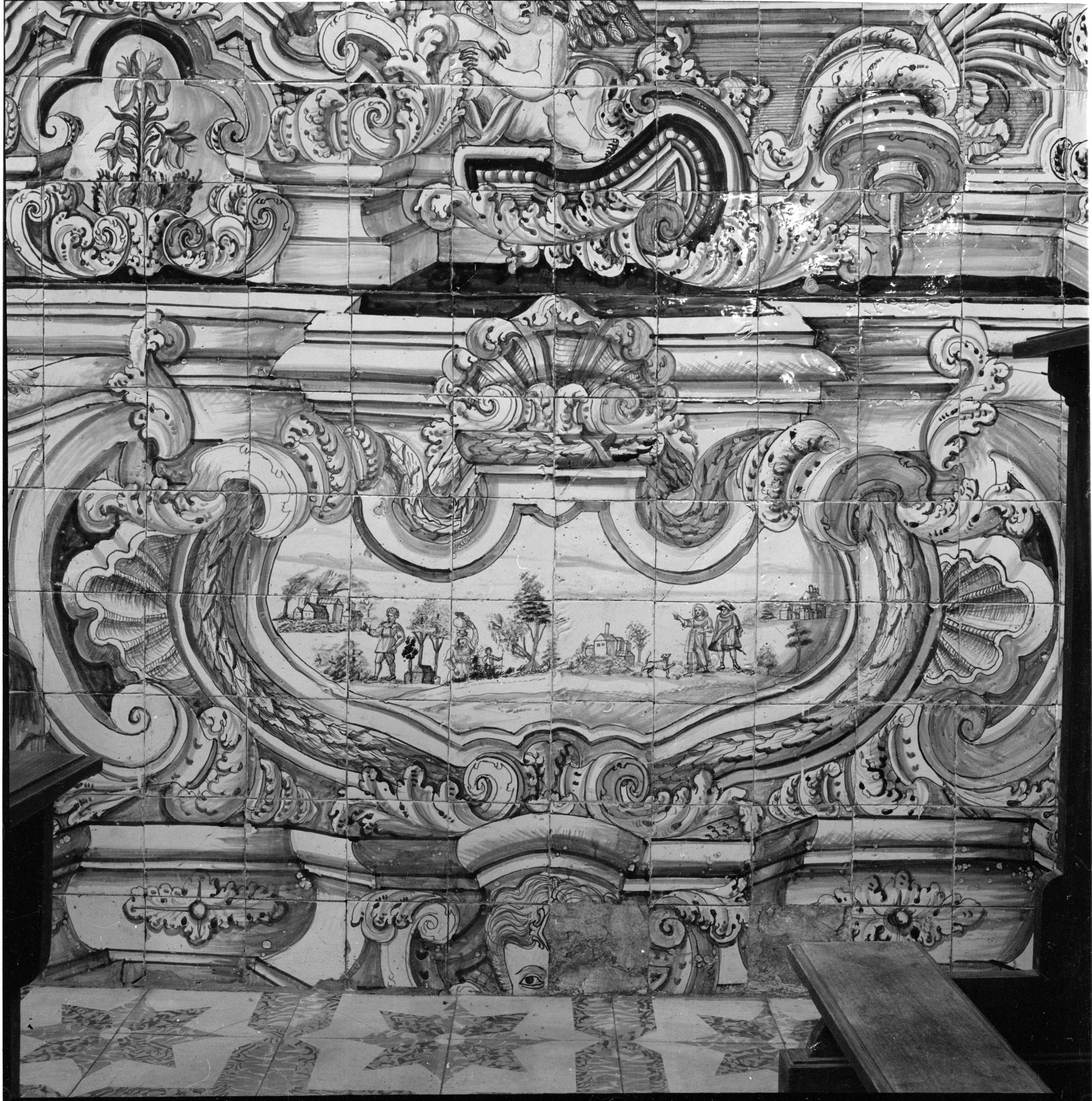
Detail in the monastery of Santa Maria

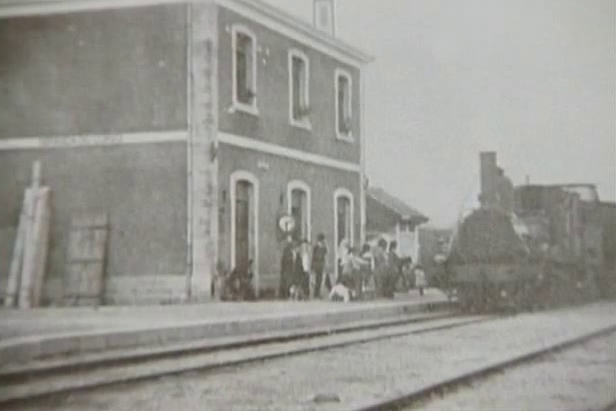
A turn of the century view of the train station in Miranda do Corvo

The first reference to the region of Miranda do Corvo arrived at the end of the 10th century, although evidence of archaeological evidence to human settlement extend further back in history. The 10th century document that referenced these lands were associated with the Monastery of Lorvão in 998, that identified a military structure in Miranda do Corvo, that included tower. Today there is recognition that the settlement of Vila Nova occurred in pre-history and that Chão de Lamas during a proto-historical interval. Archaeological excavations around the Roman settlement of Eira Velha in Lamas also unearthed the vestiges of the agricultural community important along Roman roadways.

The oldest settlement, in Alto do Calvário, suggests a period colonization dating to the Middle Ages, from dating of tombs and earthen burial excavation. Included in the discoveries were:

- a stone structure, from the end of the Middle Ages, that secured the access to the tower;
- a drop, composed of large ashlars slabs, dating to the 18th century (corresponding to part of the castle wall);
- a necropolis of graves dug into the rock, from the 12th century;
- the existence of two graves, located near the Cristo Rei statue, buried with the inscription that they were buries "in accordance with Islamic tradition, in right lateral decubitus, oriented to the East".

The primary settlement of Miranda do Corvo developed around its castle which, owing to location and defensibility, guarded the access along the old Roman roadway that crossed Corvo and connected Sellium (Tomar) to Aeminium (Coimbra), as well as the interior of the western interior peninsula. Its all-encompassing position and vantage resulted in its adopting of the name "Miranda", from the Latin Mirandus (meaning "watchtower").

The settlement was likely to have grown around the hilltop of Alto do Calvário. But, although important in the Mondego defensive line during the Christian reconquest of Coimbra, little information survives of Miranda's role. In 1116, the region was attacked by Almoravid raiders, but held back in Coimbra. The castle of Miranda do Corvo was destroyed in the 12th century, resulting in the destruction of the fortification walls, many deaths and peoples imprisoned. The castle remained in ruin for sometime, although it is unclear at what point it was reconstructed.

On 19 November 1136 Miranda received its first foral (charter) from D. Afonso Henriques, which was confirmed by King D. Afonso II.

In 1383, there was a reference to João Afonso Teles opening the gates to King D. João I of Castille when he travelled to Lisbon contest the Master of Aviz.

But along the centuries the ancient castle fell into ruin. The Livro das Posturas by the municipal council referred to the remains of the castle existing in May 1799. Other records showing the many stones were robbed from the castle, resulting in a prohibition by local authorities against those that would destroy the castle to building their own homes. But, ironically it was remodelling of the bridge of Corvo, over the Ribeira do Alhêda that resulted in the deconstruction of the structure.

During the third incursion by French forces, resulting from the Peninsular Wars, the region once again become a strategic point. Part of the battle of Casal Novo, which occurred on the morning of 14 March 1811, occurred in the parish of Lamas. A scorched earth policy by French forces resulted in the death of many, destruction of property, and the incubation of epidemics following the battle in many of the parishes.

== Geography ==
Population of Miranda do Corvo (1849–2004)
| Year | Pop. | ±% |
|---|---|---|
| 1801 | 6,412 | — |
| 1849 | 5,891 | −8.1% |
| 1900 | 12,751 | +116.4% |
| 1930 | 12,608 | −1.1% |
| 1960 | 12,810 | +1.6% |
| 1981 | 12,231 | −4.5% |
| 1991 | 11,674 | −4.6% |
| 2001 | 13,069 | +11.9% |
| 2004 | 13,400 | +2.5% |
| 2006 | 13,622 | +1.7% |
| 2011 | 13,098 | −3.8% |

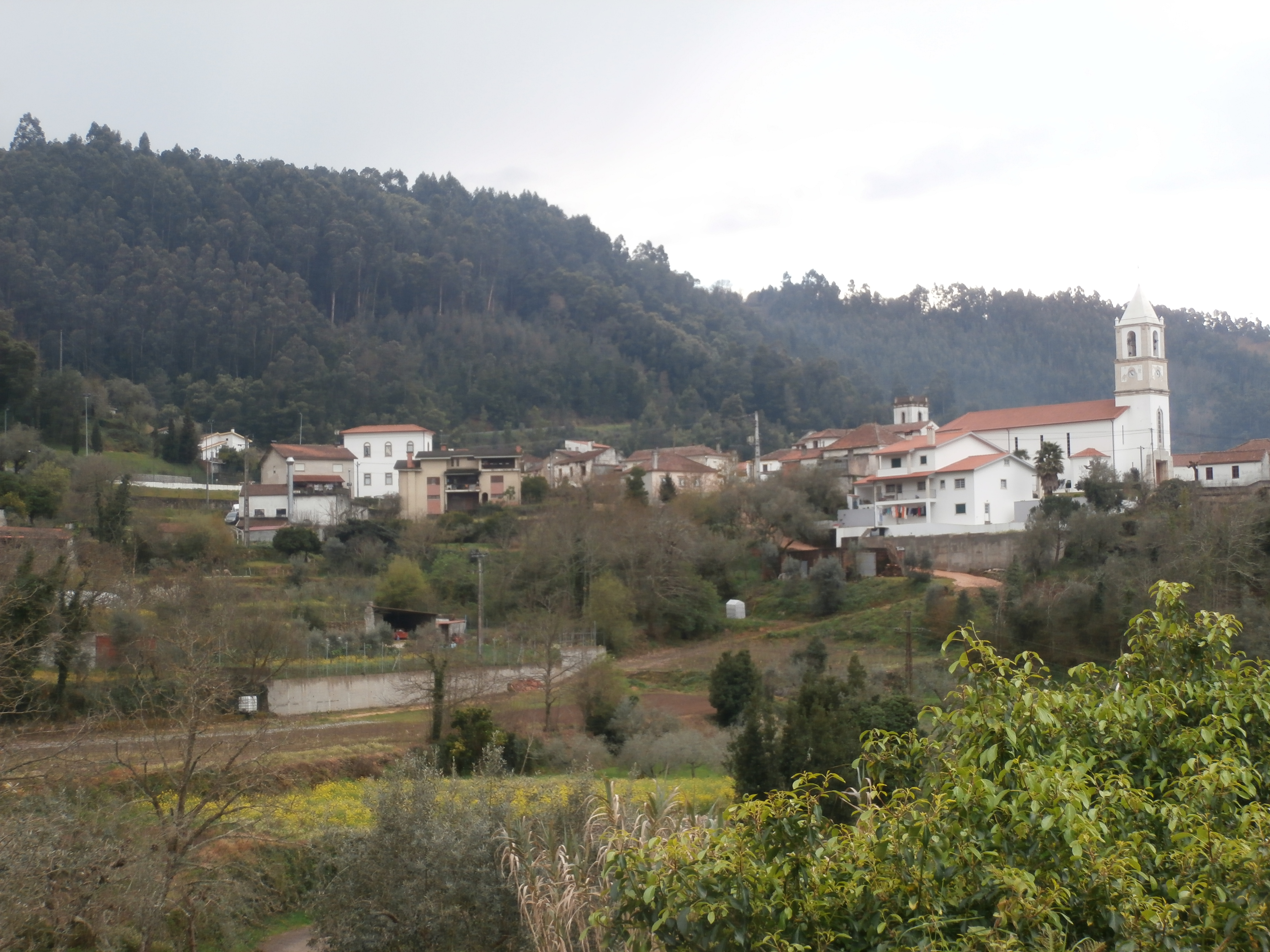
A view of Vila Nova

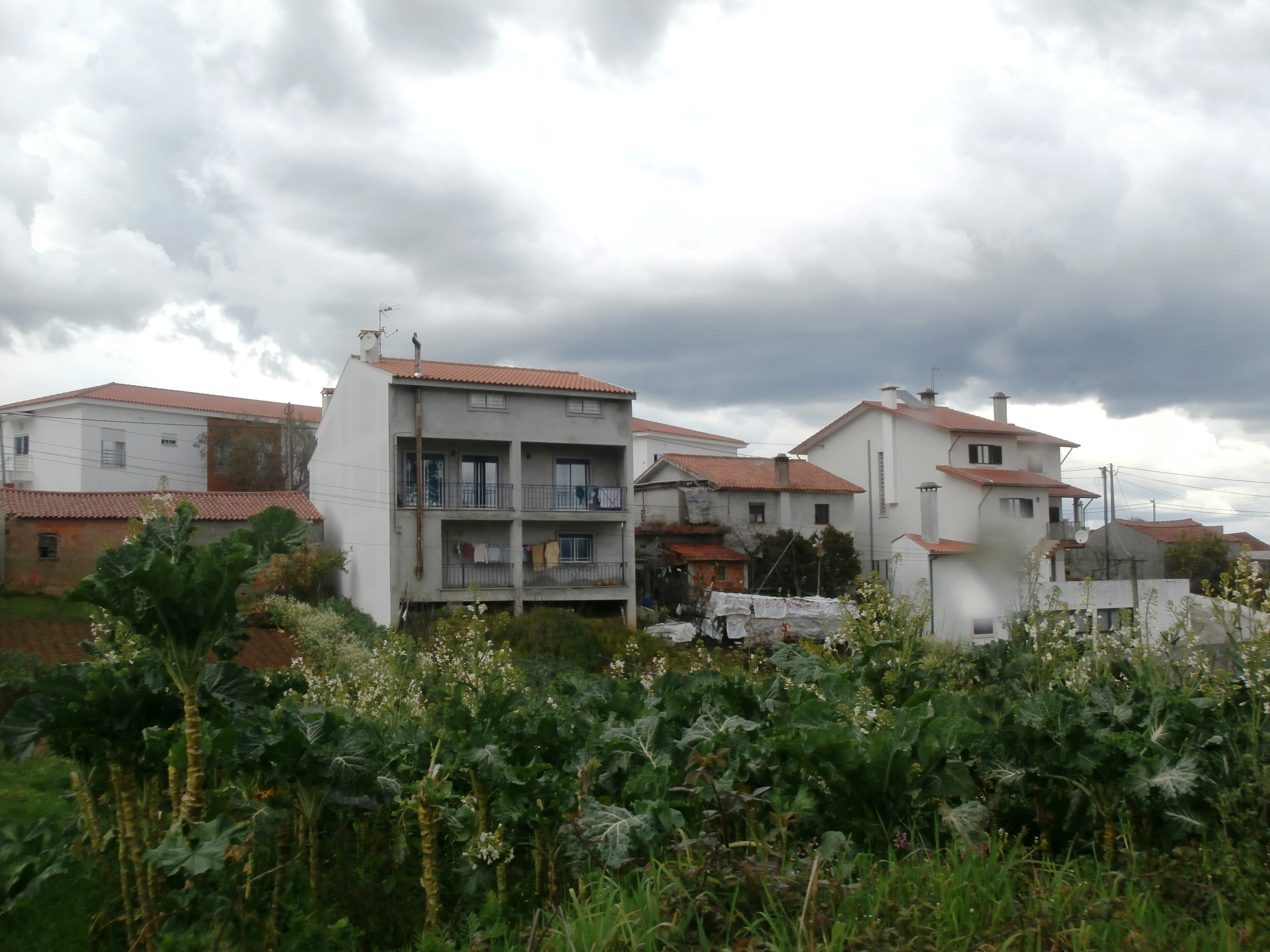
A distant view of Senhor da Serra

The municipality is limited in the northeast by Vila Nova de Poiares, east by Lousã, southeast by Figueiró dos Vinhos, southwest by Penela, west by Condeixa-a-Nova and northwest by Coimbra. The region is crossed by the Rio Ceira, Rio Dueça (also known as the Corvo River) and Rio Alheda. Miranda do Corvo is approximately 30 minutes (by bus) from the city centre of Coimbra. The municipality includes a vast area that includes Ceira, near Coimbra, until the Ribeira de Alje, along the southern mountain range, that includes the parishes of Miranda, Lamas, Vila Nova and Campelo (that became Figueiró dos Vinhos) at the beginning of the Liberal regime. Administratively, the municipality is divided into 4 civil parishes:

- Lamas
- Miranda do Corvo
- Semide e Rio Vide
- Vila Nova

== Economy ==
The floodlit cricket stadium of the Miranda do Corvo Cricket Club attracts foreign cricket teams per year to the municipality, which has resulted in a reciprocal growth in tourism (such as the volume of economic growth to the bars, hotels and restaurants). There is also a weekly market selling fresh local produce, and another market on the first Sunday of each month where mainly used items are sold.

== Architecture ==
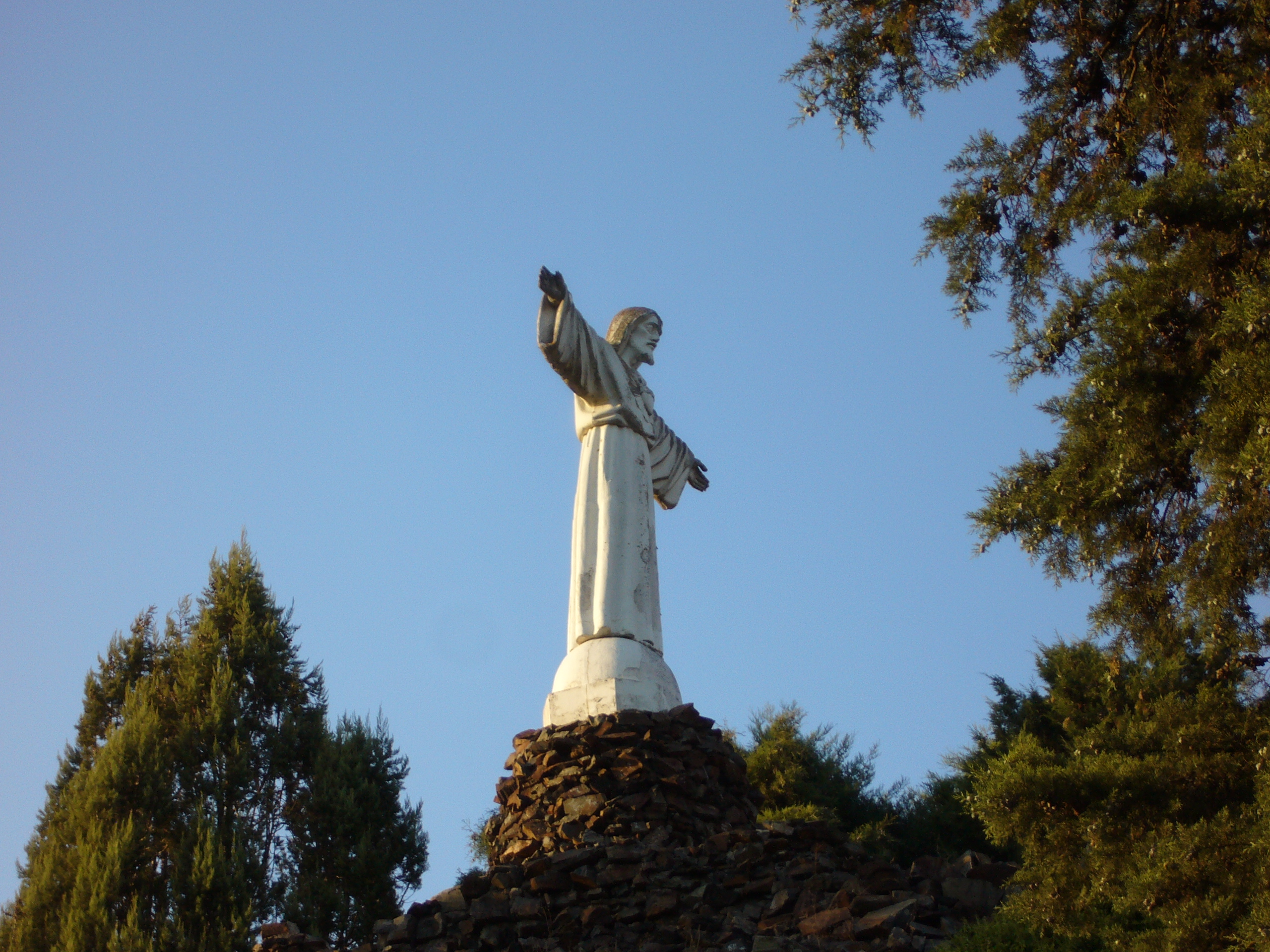
A view of the Christ the King statue on the hilltop of Alto do Calvário

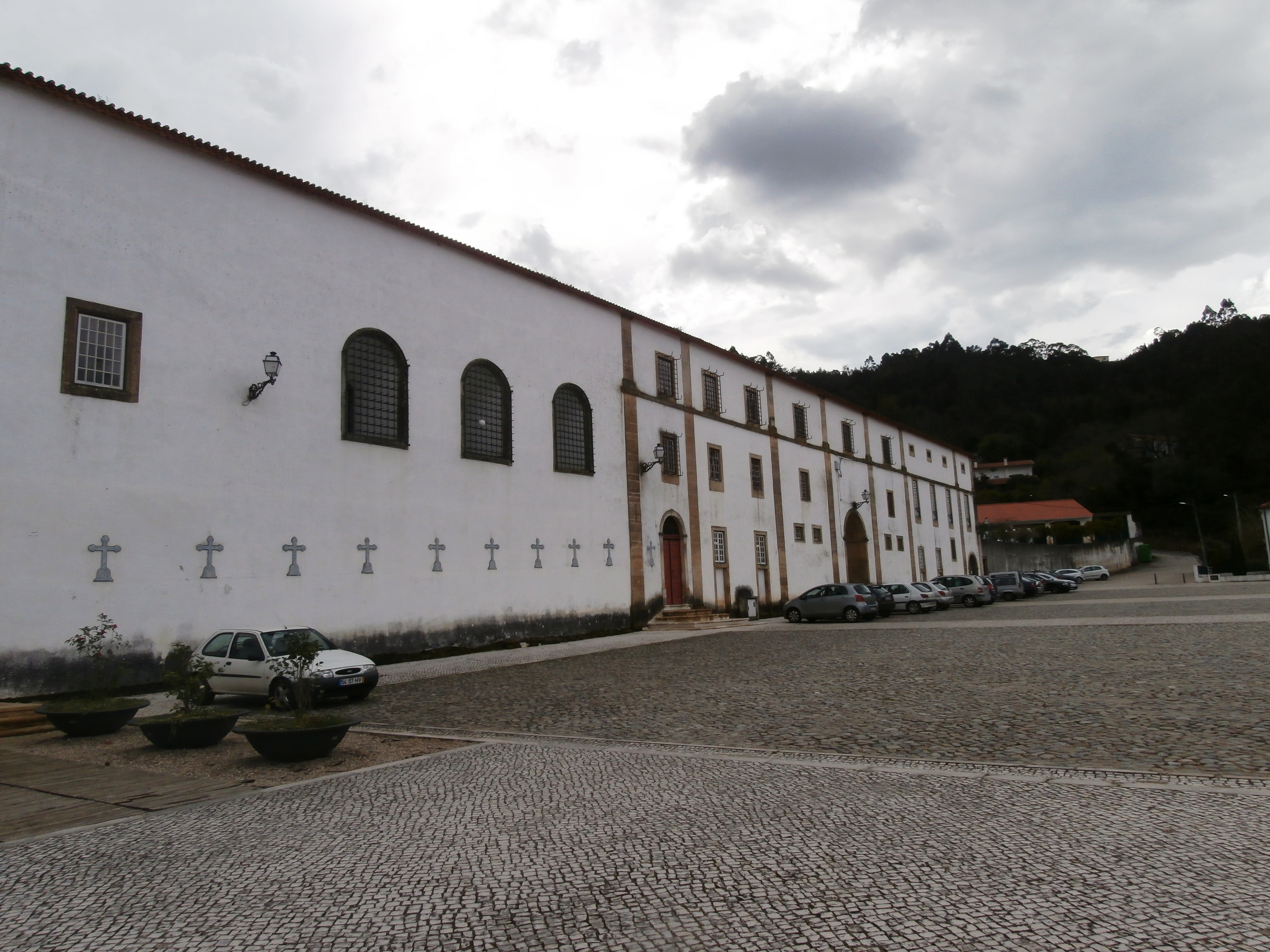
Exterior perspective of the Monastery of Nossa Senhora da Assunção

In addition to a skyline marked by a large statue of Christ the King, the town includes various architectural points of interest, including in Tabuas, an ancient pilgrimage destination dedicated to Senhora da Piedade, where young children were said to have seen visions of Our Lady of Mercy while walking in the hills. A church was constructed on the hilltop that provides a view of the entire valley.

=== Civic ===
- Municipal Palace/Hall of Miranda do Corvo (Portuguese: Câmara Municipal de Miranda do Corvo)
- Pillory of Miranda do Corvo (Portuguese: Pelourinho de Miranda do Corvo)

=== Religious ===
- Chapel of Calvário (Portuguese: Capela do Calvário)
- Chapel of Nossa Senhora da Boa Morte (Portuguese: Capela de Nossa Senhora da Boa Morte)
- Chapel of Nossa Senhora da Conceição (Portuguese: Capela de Nossa Senhora da Conceição/Capela dos Moinhos)
- Chapel of Nossa Senhora da Luz (Portuguese: Capela de Nossa Senhora da Luz)
- Chapel of Nossa Senhora da Nazaré (Portuguese: Capela de Nossa Senhora da Nazaré)
- Chapel of Santa Luzia (Portuguese: Capela de Santa Luzia)
- Chapel of Santo António da Carriceira (Portuguese: Capela de Santo António da Carriceira)
- Chapel of São Sebastião (Portuguese: Capela de São Sebastião)
- Chapel of São Silvestre (Portuguese: Capela de São Silvestre)
- Chapel of Senhor dos Passos (Portuguese: Capela do Senhor dos Passos)
- Church of the Divino Espírito Santo (Portuguese: Igreja Paroquial de Lamas/Igreja do Divino Espírito Santo)
- Church of São João Baptista (Portuguese: Igreja Paroquial de Vila Nova/Igreja de São João Baptista)
- Church of São Salvador (Portuguese: Igreja Paroquial de Miranda do Corvo/Igreja de São Salvador)
- Church of São Tiago (Portuguese: Igreja Paroquial de Rio de Vide/Igreja de São Tiago)
- Monastery of Nossa Senhora da Assunção (Portuguese: Mosteiro de Santa Maria de Semide/Mosteiro de Nossa Senhora da Assunção)
- Sanctuary of Nossa Senhora da Piedade (Portuguese: Santuário de Nossa Senhora da Piedade das Tábuas)
- Sanctuary of Senhor da Serra (Portuguese: Capela do Senhor da Serra/Santuário do Senhor da Serra)

== Notable people ==
- Tozé Marreco (born 1987 in Miranda do Corvo) a footballer with over 300 club caps
- Fausto Lourenço (born 1987 in Miranda do Corvo) a footballer with over 350 club caps (and his brother):
- Rodolfo Lourenço (born 1991 in Miranda do Corvo) a footballer with over 160 club caps

== Sport ==
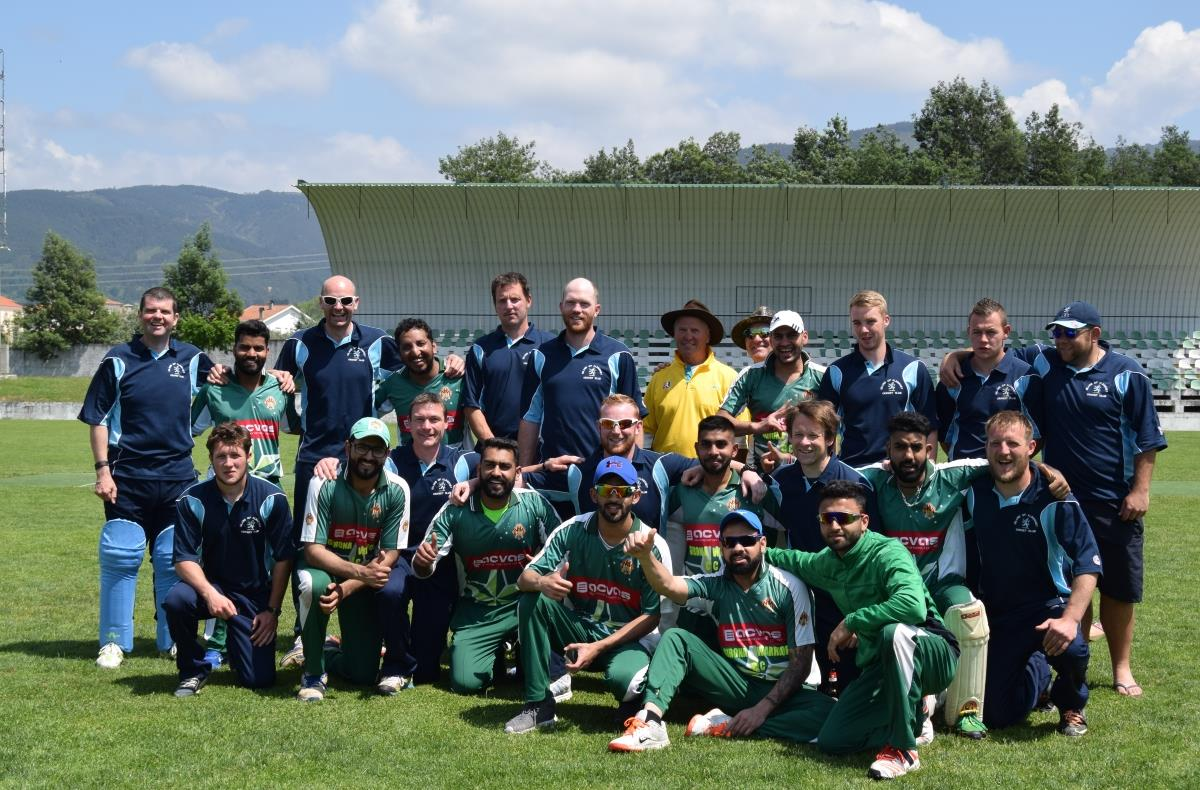
Competitors together during cricket tournament in Miranda do Corvo (2016)

The Town's cricket stadium hosted the 3rd 'Light of Faith Tour' of the Vatican Cricket Team in 2017.

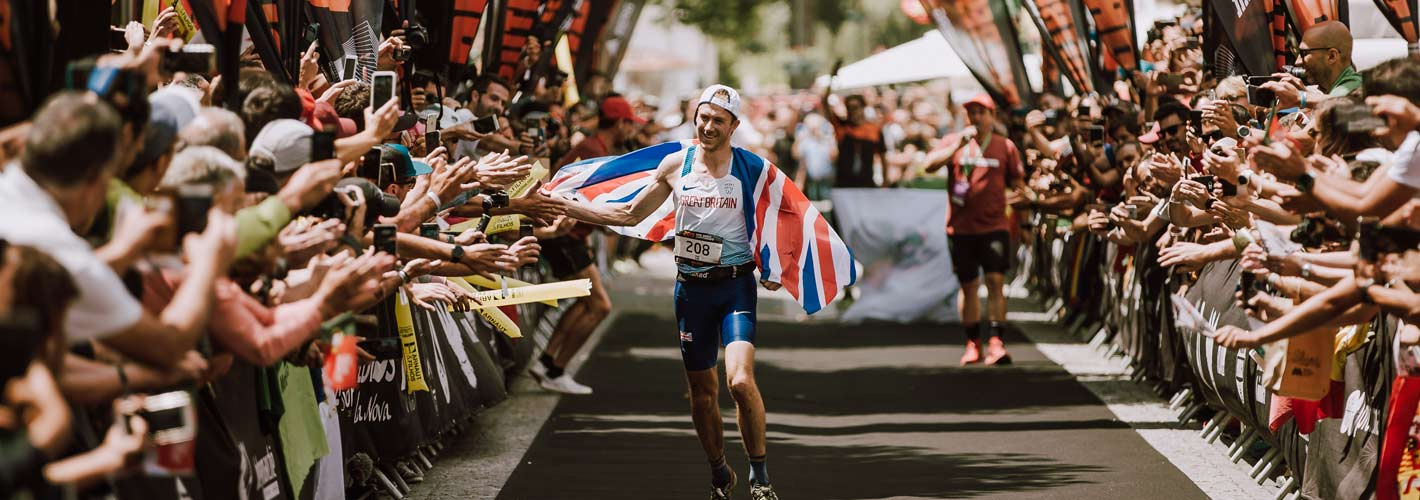
Jonathan Albon winning the 2019 Trail World Championships

The region is also the location of the popular Trilhos dos Abutres trail race, who organize the 2019 Trail World Championships, by the Local Committee Organization (Associação Abutrica).
