= 2008–09 Liga de Honra =

75th season of second-tier football league in Portugal

Liga de Honra
- Season: 2008–09
- Champions: Olhanense
- Promoted: Olhanense; União de Leiria
- Relegated: Vizela; Boavista; Gondomar

The 2008–09 Liga de Honra season is the 19th season of the competition and the 75th season of recognised second-tier football in Portugal. Trofense are the defending champions.

== Promotion and relegation ==
=== Teams promoted from Liga de Honra ===
- Trofense
- Rio Ave

=== Teams relegated to Liga de Honra ===
- Boavista
- União de Leiria

=== Teams relegated from Liga de Honra ===
- Penafiel
- Fátima

=== Teams promoted to Liga de Honra ===
- Oliveirense
- Sporting Covilhã

== League table ==
| Pos | Team | Pld | W | D | L | GF | GA | GD | Pts | Promotion or relegation |
|---|---|---|---|---|---|---|---|---|---|---|
| 1 | Olhanense (C, P) | 30 | 18 | 4 | 8 | 52 | 32 | +20 | 58 | Promotion to Primeira Liga |
| 2 | União de Leiria (P) | 30 | 15 | 9 | 6 | 46 | 29 | +17 | 54 | Promotion to Primeira Liga |
| 3 | Santa Clara | 30 | 15 | 7 | 8 | 45 | 32 | +13 | 52 | |
| 4 | Estoril | 30 | 12 | 8 | 10 | 41 | 37 | +4 | 44 | |
| 5 | Feirense | 30 | 11 | 9 | 10 | 37 | 34 | +3 | 42 | |
| 6 | Freamunde | 30 | 11 | 8 | 11 | 32 | 35 | −3 | 41 | |
| 7 | Sporting da Covilhã | 30 | 10 | 10 | 10 | 42 | 42 | 0 | 40 | |
| 8 | Varzim | 30 | 11 | 6 | 13 | 29 | 35 | −6 | 39 | |
| 9 | Gil Vicente | 30 | 8 | 14 | 8 | 36 | 37 | −1 | 38 | |
| 10 | Vizela (R) | 30 | 7 | 16 | 7 | 28 | 33 | −5 | 37 | Relegated due to a corruption case |
| 11 | Desportivo das Aves | 30 | 9 | 9 | 12 | 30 | 36 | −6 | 36 | |
| 12 | Beira-Mar | 30 | 8 | 11 | 11 | 32 | 32 | 0 | 35 | |
| 13 | Portimonense | 30 | 7 | 14 | 9 | 29 | 35 | −6 | 35 | |
| 14 | Oliveirense | 30 | 7 | 11 | 12 | 25 | 33 | −8 | 32 | |
| 15 | Boavista (R) | 30 | 9 | 5 | 16 | 28 | 44 | −16 | 32 | Relegation to Segunda Divisão |
| 16 | Gondomar (R) | 30 | 7 | 9 | 14 | 29 | 35 | −6 | 30 | Relegation to Segunda Divisão |

(C) Champions; (P) Promoted; (R) Relegated

== Results ==
| Home \ Away | BEM | BOA | DAV | EST | FEI | FRE | GVI | GON | OLH | OLI | PTM | STC | SCO | ULE | VAR | VIZ |
|---|---|---|---|---|---|---|---|---|---|---|---|---|---|---|---|---|
| Beira-Mar | | 3–1 | 4–0 | 3–1 | 2–2 | 1–0 | 0–0 | 2–1 | 1–1 | 2–1 | 0–0 | 0–0 | 0–1 | 2–3 | 1–1 | 1–1 |
| Boavista | 1–2 | | 1–1 | 2–0 | 2–2 | 2–1 | 0–1 | 1–2 | 1–4 | 1–0 | 0–1 | 3–1 | 1–4 | 2–0 | 2–0 | 2–1 |
| Desportivo das Aves | 1–0 | 2–0 | | 1–2 | 1–0 | 0–1 | 2–0 | 0–1 | 1–2 | 2–2 | 0–0 | 1–1 | 2–0 | 0–2 | 0–0 | 1–3 |
| Estoril | 2–0 | 1–2 | 3–2 | | 2–2 | 3–0 | 2–1 | 0–0 | 2–1 | 0–0 | 0–0 | 1–2 | 3–1 | 2–2 | 1–0 | 0–0 |
| Feirense | 2–0 | 2–0 | 2–1 | 1–0 | | 1–5 | 2–1 | 2–0 | 3–1 | 0–1 | 1–1 | 1–0 | 2–1 | 0–0 | 1–2 | 0–0 |
| Freamunde | 1–0 | 2–0 | 1–2 | 0–1 | 2–2 | | 1–0 | 2–0 | 1–3 | 1–0 | 0–0 | 2–1 | 0–0 | 1–0 | 2–1 | 1–1 |
| Gil Vicente | 2–2 | 2–0 | 1–1 | 2–2 | 2–1 | 0–0 | | 3–3 | 3–0 | 1–1 | 0–0 | 3–2 | 1–1 | 1–1 | 1–2 | 1–1 |
| Gondomar | 0–0 | 1–1 | 0–1 | 3–0 | 0–1 | 1–3 | 3–0 | | 0–1 | 0–0 | 0–0 | 1–2 | 1–1 | 0–1 | 2–1 | 2–0 |
| Olhanense | 2–0 | 1–1 | 2–0 | 3–2 | 2–1 | 5–0 | 1–0 | 2–0 | | 3–0 | 4–0 | 1–0 | 1–2 | 0–0 | 1–0 | 1–0 |
| Oliveirense | 0–0 | 2–0 | 0–0 | 0–2 | 2–1 | 2–1 | 1–1 | 1–1 | 1–0 | | 0–0 | 1–2 | 1–2 | 2–1 | 2–1 | 0–0 |
| Portimonense | 1–1 | 0–1 | 5–2 | 1–2 | 1–3 | 1–1 | 3–0 | 2–2 | 2–3 | 1–0 | | 1–1 | 1–0 | 0–1 | 2–1 | 2–2 |
| Santa Clara | 1–0 | 3–1 | 1–1 | 1–1 | 1–0 | 1–0 | 0–2 | 2–1 | 0–2 | 3–1 | 3–0 | | 1–1 | 2–0 | 1–0 | 5–1 |
| Sporting da Covilhã | 3–1 | 1–0 | 0–2 | 2–1 | 0–0 | 1–1 | 1–2 | 1–3 | 4–3 | 3–2 | 4–1 | 2–4 | | 2–3 | 1–1 | 1–1 |
| União de Leiria | 2–1 | 2–0 | 1–1 | 4–2 | 2–1 | 3–0 | 1–1 | 3–1 | 5–1 | 1–0 | 0–1 | 1–1 | 1–1 | | 1–0 | 1–1 |
| Varzim | 1–0 | 2–0 | 1–0 | 0–3 | 2–1 | 2–1 | 2–3 | 1–0 | 2–1 | 1–1 | 1–0 | 2–1 | 1–1 | 0–2 | | 0–2 |
| Vizela | 0–3 | 0–0 | 0–2 | 1–0 | 0–0 | 1–1 | 1–1 | 1–0 | 0–0 | 2–1 | 2–2 | 1–2 | 1–0 | 3–2 | 1–1 | |

Legend: Blue = home team win; Yellow = draw; Red = away team win.
