= Stéphane Madeira =

French footballer

Personal information
- Full name: Stéphane Madeira
- Date of birth: 4 January 1990 (age 36)
- Place of birth: Paris, France
- Height: 1.93 m (6 ft 4 in)
- Position: Center back

Team information
- Current team: Freamunde
- Number: 4

Youth career
- 2008–2009: Auxerre

Senior career*
Years	Team	Apps	(Gls)
2008–2012	Auxerre B	20	(2)
2009–2012	Auxerre C	32	(3)
2012–2014	Moreirense	13	(0)
2015	Chaves	17	(0)
2015–2016	Oliveirense	28	(1)
2016–	Freamunde	8	(2)
- * Club domestic league appearances and goals as of 6 November 2016

Stéphane Madeira (born 4 January 1994) is a French professional footballer who plays for Freamunde.

== Club career ==
Madeira, only played in the reserve teams of Auxerre and couldn't break into the first team. In 2012, he joined Segunda Liga team Moreirense for a 3 year contract. On 2 January 2015, his contract was cancelled by mutual consent.
