= Jorge Vilela =

Portuguese footballer

Personal information
- Full name: Jorge Daniel Abreu Vilela
- Date of birth: 16 March 1996 (age 30)
- Place of birth: Citânia, Portugal
- Height: 1.83 m (6 ft 0 in)
- Position: Midfielder

Team information
- Current team: Varzim
- Number: 8

Youth career
- 2006–2008: Leões de Citânia
- 2008–2015: Freamunde

Senior career*
Years	Team	Apps	(Gls)
2015–2018	Freamunde	42	(3)
2015–2016	→ Aliados Lordelo (loan)	30	(1)
2018–2019	Aves	0	(0)
2019–2022	Portimonense	0	(0)
2020–2022	→ Sporting da Covilhã (loan)	32	(0)
2022–	Varzim	12	(0)
- * Club domestic league appearances and goals as of 19 February 2023

Jorge Daniel Abreu Vilela (born 16 March 1996) is a Portuguese footballer who plays for Varzim as a midfielder.

== Club career ==
On 31 July 2016, Vilela made his professional debut with Freamunde in a 2016–17 Taça da Liga match against União Madeira.
