= 1998–99 Segunda Divisão B =

Segunda Divisão
- Season: 1998–99
- Champions: SC Freamunde
- Promoted: SC Covilhã; SC Freamunde; Imortal DC
- Relegated: 12 teams

The 1998–99 Segunda Divisão season was the 65th season of the competition and the 52nd season of recognised third-tier football in Portugal.

== Overview ==
The league was contested by 54 teams in 3 divisions with SC Covilhã, SC Freamunde and Imortal DC winning the respective divisional competitions and gaining promotion to the Liga de Honra. The overall championship was won by SC Freamunde.

== League standings ==
=== Segunda Divisão – Zona Norte ===
Pos	Team	Pld	W	D	L	GF	GA	GD	Pts	Promotion or relegation
1	SC Freamunde	34	23	6	5	60	28	+32	75	Promotion to Liga de Honra
2	Leixões SC	34	19	9	6	62	35	+27	66	
3	AD Fafe	34	19	6	9	66	37	+29	63	
4	CD Trofense	34	17	11	6	49	33	+16	62	
5	FC Vizela	34	15	9	10	58	40	+18	54	
6	FC Marco	34	15	7	12	39	40	−1	52	
7	Infesta FC	34	13	6	15	63	58	+5	45	
8	Os Sandinenses	34	12	8	14	36	50	−14	44	
9	Ermesinde SC	34	12	7	15	37	51	−14	43	
10	CD Arrifanense	34	11	9	14	35	54	−19	42	
11	FC Famalicão	34	11	9	14	48	52	−4	42	
12	Lixa FC	34	11	8	15	36	49	−13	41	
13	Lusitânia Lourosa	34	10	10	14	39	34	+5	40	
14	Caçadores das Taipas	34	10	10	14	51	52	−1	40	
15	GD Ribeirão	34	10	8	16	35	44	−9	38	Relegation to Terceira Divisão
16	SC Vila Real	34	10	5	19	27	42	−15	35	Relegation to Terceira Divisão
17	SC São João de Ver	34	9	7	18	35	56	−21	34	Relegation to Terceira Divisão
18	Gondomar SC	34	7	9	18	32	53	−21	30	Relegation to Terceira Divisão

=== Segunda Divisão – Zona Centro ===
Pos	Team	Pld	W	D	L	GF	GA	GD	Pts	Promotion or relegation
1	SC Covilhã	34	19	10	5	49	27	+22	67	Promotion to Liga de Honra
2	AD Sanjoanense	34	19	5	10	46	37	+9	62	
3	SC Lourinhanense	34	17	11	6	61	34	+27	62	
4	Caldas SC	34	15	11	8	66	53	+13	56	
5	Académico Viseu	34	16	7	11	45	29	+16	55	
6	AD Ovarense	34	15	8	11	42	35	+7	53	
7	GD Peniche	34	13	9	12	52	55	−3	48	
8	SCU Torreense	34	13	9	12	47	45	+2	48	
9	UD Oliveirense	34	12	12	10	48	41	+7	48	
10	Beneditense CD	34	10	13	11	46	49	−3	43	
11	AC Cucujães	34	12	7	15	36	50	−14	43	
12	CD Torres Novas	34	12	6	16	47	55	−8	42	
13	UD Vilafranquense	34	12	4	18	50	61	−11	40	
14	AD Guarda	34	10	8	16	38	49	−11	38	
15	Estrela Portalegre	34	8	13	13	40	46	−6	37	Relegation to Terceira Divisão
16	CD Fátima	34	8	11	15	38	46	−8	35	Relegation to Terceira Divisão
17	SL Fanhões	34	10	5	19	42	55	−13	35	Relegation to Terceira Divisão
18	O Elvas CAD	34	7	7	20	41	67	−26	28	Relegation to Terceira Divisão

=== Segunda Divisão – Zona Sul ===
Pos	Team	Pld	W	D	L	GF	GA	GD	Pts	Promotion or relegation
1	Imortal DC	34	18	9	7	51	32	+19	63	Promotion to Liga de Honra
2	FC Barreirense	34	17	11	6	45	24	+21	62	
3	Portimonense SC	34	15	14	5	58	30	+28	59	
4	SC Olhanense	34	15	13	6	51	34	+17	58	
5	AD Machico	34	15	12	7	51	38	+13	57	
6	Oriental Lisboa	34	14	12	8	40	34	+6	54	
7	Amora FC	34	14	9	11	49	49	0	51	
8	Juventude Évora	34	13	10	11	51	45	+6	49	
9	Nacional Funchal	34	15	4	15	42	39	+3	49	
10	AD Camacha	34	12	11	11	39	37	+2	47	
11	CSD Câmara de Lobos	34	12	9	13	37	36	+1	45	
12	Operário Açores	34	10	12	12	39	46	−7	42	
13	Louletano DC	34	10	10	14	45	51	−6	40	
14	Atlético CP	34	10	9	15	30	50	−20	39	
15	União Montemor	34	8	14	12	37	43	−6	38	Relegation to Terceira Divisão
16	Seixal FC	34	9	6	19	43	50	−7	33	Relegation to Terceira Divisão
17	SU Sintrense	34	8	5	21	41	59	−18	29	Relegation to Terceira Divisão
18	CD Beja	34	2	8	24	25	77	−52	14	Relegation to Terceira Divisão
