= Luís Timóteo =

Portuguese footballer

Personal information
- Full name: Luís Carlos Neto da Costa
- Date of birth: 4 September 1998 (age 28)
- Place of birth: Paços de Ferreira, Portugal
- Height: 1.83 m (6 ft 0 in)
- Position: Defender

Team information
- Current team: Tirsense

Youth career
- 2008–2017: Freamunde

Senior career*
Years	Team	Apps	(Gls)
2017–2018	Freamunde	8	(0)
2018–2019	Sobrado	26	(2)
2019–2020	Freamunde	22	(1)
2020–2021	Mirandela	26	(0)
2021–	Tirsense	3	(0)
- * Club domestic league appearances and goals as of 18 October 2021

Luís Carlos Neto da Costa (born 4 September 1998) known as Luís Timóteo, is a Portuguese professional footballer who plays for Tirsense as a defender.
