= José Amadeu =

Portuguese footballer

Personal information
- Full name: José Amadeu dos Santos Mendes
- Date of birth: 28 January 1995 (age 31)
- Place of birth: Gandra, Paredes, Portugal
- Height: 1.83 m (6 ft 0 in)
- Position: Centre-back

Team information
- Current team: Paredes

Youth career
- 2004–2012: Paredes
- 2012–2014: Freamunde
- 2018: Aves

Senior career*
Years	Team	Apps	(Gls)
2014–2018	Freamunde	35	(0)
2018–2019	Paredes	18	(0)
2019–2020	Espinho	23	(2)
2020	Gondomar	1	(0)
2020–	Paredes	19	(1)
- * Club domestic league appearances and goals as of 31 August 2021

José Amadeu dos Santos Mendes, known as Amadeu (born 28 January 1995) is a Portuguese footballer who plays for Paredes as a centre-back.

== Career ==
On 16 November 2014, Amadeu made his professional debut with Freamunde in a 2014–15 Segunda Liga match against Santa Clara.
