= Ricardo Silva (footballer, born 1977) =

Portuguese footballer

Personal information
- Full name: Ricardo Jorge Fernandes da Silva
- Date of birth: 29 March 1977 (age 49)
- Place of birth: Agualva-Cacém, Portugal
- Height: 1.72 m (5 ft 8 in)
- Position: Forward

Youth career
- 1985–1988: Atlético Cacém
- 1988–1992: Benfica
- 1992–1994: Aqualva
- 1994–1996: Estoril

Senior career*
Years	Team	Apps	(Gls)
1996–1997	Real Massamá	22	(8)
1997	Vitória Setúbal	5	(0)
1998	Olhanense	19	(5)
1998–1999	Gil Vicente	24	(4)
1999	Boavista	1	(0)
2000	Freamunde	19	(2)
2000–2001	Santa Clara	17	(0)
2001–2004	Olivais Moscavide	89	(33)
2004–2008	Olhanense	84	(26)
2009	Olivais Moscavide	12	(2)
2009	Igreja Nova	1	(0)
2010–2011	Atlético Cacém		
Total		293	(80)
- * Club domestic league appearances and goals

Ricardo Jorge Fernandes da Silva (born 29 March 1977) is a Portuguese former footballer who played as a forward.

== Club career ==
Fernandes was born in Agualva-Cacém, Sintra, Lisboa Region. During his career, spent most in the second and third divisions of Portuguese football, he represented Real SC, Vitória de Setúbal (his first Primeira Liga experience), S.C. Olhanense – two spells – Gil Vicente FC, Boavista FC (one more match in the top level), S.C. Freamunde, C.D. Santa Clara, C.D. Olivais e Moscavide – another two stints – G.D. Igreja Nova and Atlético Clube do Cacém (his very first youth club, to where he returned in January 2010 after nearly 25 years).

In 2011, Silva started his coaching career with his last team, still in the regional leagues.
