= Dani Carvalho =

Portuguese footballer

Personal information
- Full name: Daniel Jesus Moreira Carvalho
- Date of birth: 13 October 1995 (age 31)
- Place of birth: Paredes, Portugal
- Height: 1.85 m (6 ft 1 in)
- Position: Goalkeeper

Team information
- Current team: Rebordosa
- Number: 99

Youth career
- 2006–2011: Paredes
- 2011–2013: Freamunde

Senior career*
Years	Team	Apps	(Gls)
2014–2017	Freamunde	5	(0)
2017–2020	Paredes	92	(0)
2020–2022	Fafe	6	(0)
2022–2024	Paredes	28	(0)
2025	Cinfães	11	(0)
2025–2026	Marco 09	21	(0)
2026–	Rebordosa	3	(0)
- * Club domestic league appearances and goals as of 6 September 2026

Daniel Jesus Moreira Carvalho (born 13 October 1995 in) simply Dani Carvalho, is a Portuguese footballer who plays for Campeonato de Portugal club Rebordosa as a goalkeeper.

== Career ==
On 4 November 2015, Dani made his professional debut with Freamunde in a 2015–16 Segunda Liga match against Feirense.
