= Complexo Desportivo do SC Freamunde =

Multi-use stadium in Freamunde, Portugal

Coordinates: 41°16′35″N 8°20′22″W

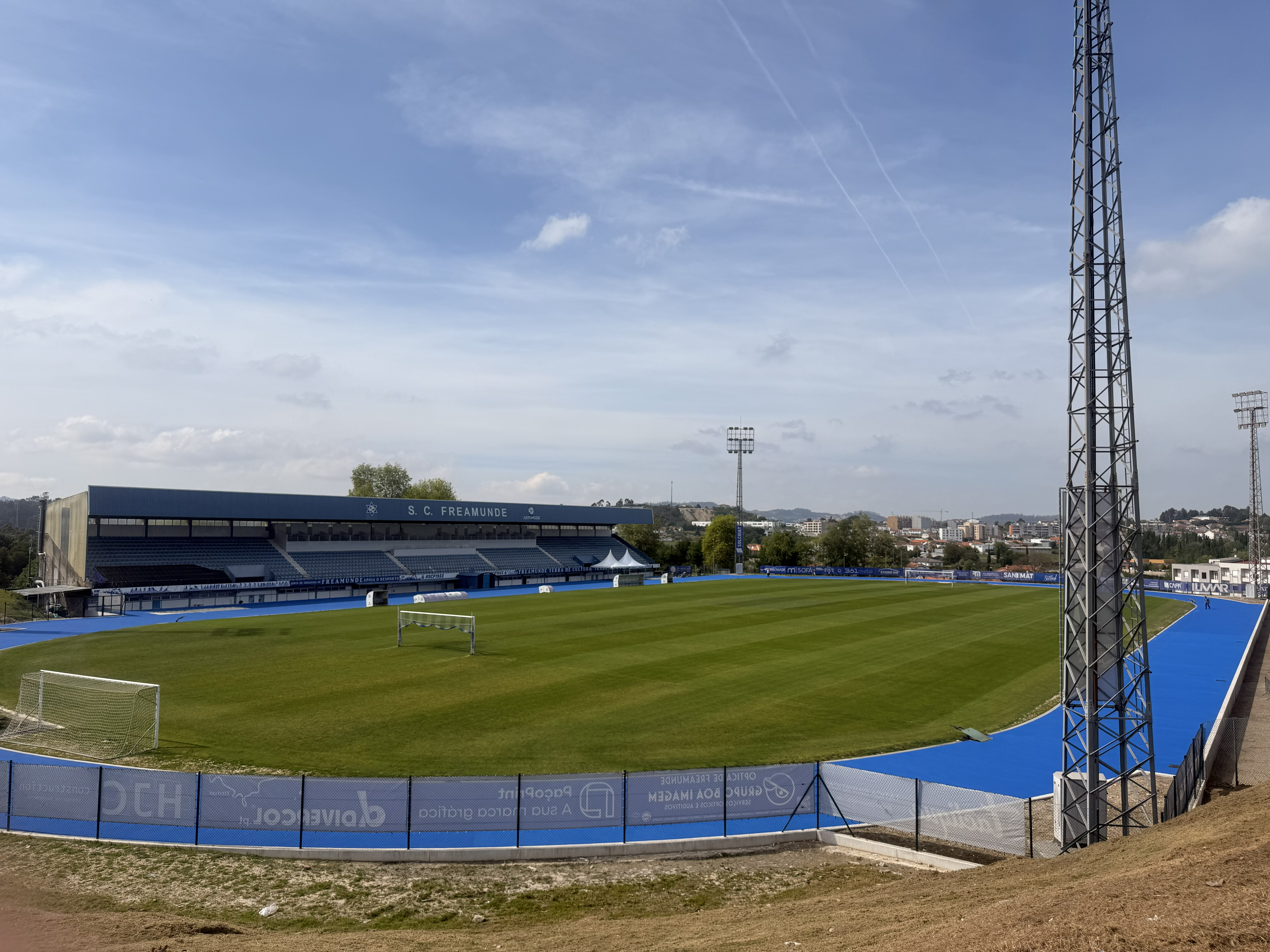
- Interactive map of Complexo Desportivo do SC Freamunde
- Address: Freamunde; Portugal
- Capacity: 3,919
- Type: Stadium
- Current use: Yes

Tenants
- S.C. Freamunde

Complexo Desportivo do Sport Clube Freamunde is a multi-use stadium in Freamunde, Portugal. It is currently used mostly for football matches and is the home stadium of S.C. Freamunde. The stadium is able to hold 3,919 seated people.
