= Fábio Vieira (footballer, born 1991) =

Portuguese footballer

Personal information
- Full name: Fábio da Rocha Vieira
- Date of birth: 12 June 1991 (age 35)
- Place of birth: Porto, Portugal
- Height: 1.81 m (5 ft 11 1/2 in)
- Position: Midfielder

Youth career
- 2004–2009: Boavista
- 2009–2010: Feirense

Senior career*
Years	Team	Apps	(Gls)
2010	Esmoriz	1	(0)
2011–2013	Espinho	37	(2)
2013–2016	Vitória Guimarães B	70	(7)
2016–2017	Freamunde	22	(0)
2017–2018	Anadia	14	(2)
2018	Felgueiras 1932	7	(1)
2018–2019	Olympiakos Nicosia	25	(8)
2019–2020	Beira-Mar	20	(1)
2020–2021	Valadares Gaia	17	(4)
2021–2022	Lusitânia	16	(0)
2022–2025	Florgrade	83	(14)
Total		312	(39)
- * Club domestic league appearances and goals

Fábio da Rocha Vieira (born 12 June 1991) is a Portuguese former professional footballer who played as a midfielder.

== Club career ==
Born in Porto, Vieira started his senior career in the lower leagues, with S.C. Esmoriz and S.C. Espinho. In 2013 he joined Vitória de Guimarães, being assigned to their reserves and helping them to promote to the Segunda Liga in his first season.

Vieira played his first match as a professional on 9 November 2014, coming on as a late substitute in a 3–2 away win against C.D. Tondela. He scored his only goal in the second division the following 1 February, closing the 5–0 home victory over U.D. Oliveirense.

Vieira's last season in the second tier was 2016–17, when he failed to find the net and was also relegated with S.C. Freamunde.
