= Nuno Sousa =

Portuguese footballer

Personal information
- Full name: Nuno Filipe Gonçalves de Sousa
- Date of birth: 17 January 1974 (age 52)
- Place of birth: Lisbon, Portugal
- Height: 1.82 m (5 ft 11 1/2 in)
- Position: Forward

Youth career
- 1985–1991: Oriental
- 1991–1992: Belenenses

Senior career*
Years	Team	Apps	(Gls)
1992	Belenenses	1	(0)
1992–1993	União Tomar	27	(8)
1993–1994	Sintrense	16	(3)
1994–1998	Vilafranquense		
1998–2001	Esposende	84	(31)
2001–2004	Rio Ave	40	(6)
2003–2004	→ Gondomar (loan)	25	(15)
2004–2006	Paços Ferreira	14	(0)
2005–2006	→ Gondomar (loan)	33	(20)
2006–2007	Feirense	26	(7)
2007–2008	Vizela	17	(8)
2008–2009	Estoril	17	(2)
2009–2011	Fátima	51	(13)
2011–2012	Mafra	23	(5)
Total		374	(118)
- * Club domestic league appearances and goals

Nuno Filipe Gonçalves de Sousa (born 17 January 1974 in Lisbon) is a Portuguese retired footballer who played as a forward.

Over 12 seasons, he amassed Segunda Liga totals of 246 matches and 67 goals. In the Primeira Liga, he appeared for Rio Ave FC (four games).
