= Huguinho (footballer, born 1988) =

Portuguese footballer

Personal information
- Full name: Hugo Fílipe Sousa Pereira
- Date of birth: 20 March 1988 (age 38)
- Place of birth: Vila Nova de Gaia, Portugal
- Height: 1.81 m (5 ft 11 1/2 in)
- Position: Defender

Team information
- Current team: Freamunde
- Number: 16

Youth career
- 2000–2006: Canelas Gaia
- 2006–2007: Coimbrões

Senior career*
Years	Team	Apps	(Gls)
2007–2013	Coimbrões	34	(0)
2011	→ Boavista (loan)	1	(0)
2013–2014	Leixões	20	(0)
2014–	Freamunde	55	(1)
- * Club domestic league appearances and goals as of 19 March 2017

Hugo Fílipe de Sousa Pereira (born 20 March 1988) known as Huguinho, is a Portuguese footballer who plays for Freamunde as a defender.

== Football career ==
On 4 May 2013, Huguinho made his professional debut with Leixões in a 2012–13 Segunda Liga match against Vitória Guimarães B.
