= Fausto Lourenço =

Portuguese footballer (born 1987)

Fausto
Personal information
- Full name: Fausto Jorge Dias Lourenço
- Date of birth: 19 January 1987 (age 39)
- Place of birth: Miranda do Corvo, Portugal
- Height: 1.77 m (5 ft 10 in)
- Position: Forward

Youth career
- 1997–1998: Lousanense
- 2000–2001: Mirandense
- 2001–2002: Académica
- 2002–2003: Padroense
- 2003–2005: Porto

Senior career*
Years	Team	Apps	(Gls)
2005–2008	Académica	0	(0)
2006–2007	→ Tourizense (loan)	16	(3)
2007–2008	→ Anadia (loan)	25	(8)
2008–2009	Lokomotiv Mezdra	15	(0)
2009–2010	Onisilos	9	(3)
2010–2011	Neuchâtel Xamax	9	(0)
2011–2012	Leixões	26	(2)
2012–2013	Atyrau	7	(0)
2013–2014	Tondela	9	(3)
2014	Académico Viseu	17	(2)
2014–2018	Freamunde	130	(16)
2018	Vilaverdense	15	(1)
2018–2019	Merelinense	31	(7)
2019–2020	Gondomar	23	(7)
2020–2023	Anadia	80	(36)
2023–2024	Académica	19	(1)
Total		431	(89)
- * Club domestic league appearances and goals

Fausto Jorge Dias Lourenço (born 19 January 1987), known simply as Fausto, is a Portuguese former professional footballer who played as a forward.

== Club career ==
Fausto was born in Miranda do Corvo, Coimbra District. An unsuccessful youth graduate at FC Porto, he began his professional career with Académica de Coimbra, but never appeared officially for the team in his first spell, going on to serve loans at third division sides G.D. Tourizense and Anadia FC.

In July 2008, Fausto moved to Bulgaria with FC Lokomotiv Mezdra in the First Professional Football League, failing to score as the club finished in eighth position. In the following years, he played in Cyprus and Switzerland.

Fausto then represented, in his country's Segunda Liga, Leixões SC, C.D. Tondela, Académico de Viseu F.C. and S.C. Freamunde. He also had a brief stint in the Kazakhstan Premier League with FC Atyrau.

On 3 April 2021, shortly after having become a father, the 34-year-old Fausto scored a hat-trick for Anadia in a 4–0 win against S.C. Beira-Mar in the third tier. He finished his career in that league at the end of the 2023–24 season with Académica, then worked with his last club as assistant and interim manager.
