= Sergio Hipperdinger =

Argentine footballer (born 1992)

Personal information
- Date of birth: January 14, 1991 (age 35)
- Place of birth: General José de San Martín, Argentina
- Height: 1.78 m (5 ft 10 in)
- Position: Forward

Team information
- Current team: Freamunde
- Number: 56

Senior career*
Years	Team	Apps	(Gls)
2011–2016	Quilmes	20	(1)
2016–	Freamunde	11	(0)
- * Club domestic league appearances and goals as of 19 March 2017

Sergio Hipperdinger (born 14 January 1992) is an Argentine footballer who plays for Freamunde as a forward.
