= 2006–07 Segunda Divisão =

Segunda Divisão
- Season: 2006–07
- Champions: SC Freamunde
- Promoted: SC Freamunde; CD Fátima
- Relegated: 13 teams

The 2006–07 Segunda Divisão season was the 73rd season of the competition and the 60th season of recognised third-tier football in Portugal.

== Overview ==
The league was contested by 56 teams in 4 divisions with SC Freamunde, União Funchal, CD Fátima and Real winning the respective divisional competitions and progressing to the championship playoffs. The overall championship was won by SC Freamunde and the runners-up CD Fátima were also promoted to the Liga de Honra.

== League standings ==
=== Série A ===
Pos	Team	Pld	W	D	L	GF	GA	GD	Pts	Qualification or relegation
1	SC Freamunde	26	16	4	6	38	24	+14	52	Championship Playoffs
2	AD Pontassolense	26	14	9	3	41	19	+22	51	
3	Moreirense FC	26	12	9	5	30	20	+10	45	
4	GD Ribeirão	26	11	6	9	34	29	+5	39	
5	AC Vila Meã	26	9	7	10	27	32	−5	34	
6	AD Fafe	26	7	12	7	39	36	+3	33	
7	Marítimo Funchal B	26	8	9	9	32	36	−4	33	
8	Lixa	26	8	9	9	21	26	−5	33	
9	Maria da Fonte	26	9	5	12	26	31	−5	32	
10	CD Ribeira Brava	26	6	12	8	26	26	0	30	
11	AD Lousada	26	7	9	10	29	34	−5	30	
12	FC Famalicão	26	7	9	10	31	35	−4	30	Relegation to Terceira Divisão
13	GD Bragança	26	5	10	11	32	43	−11	25	Relegation to Terceira Divisão
14	FC Maia	26	6	4	16	30	45	−15	22	Relegation to Terceira Divisão

=== Série B ===
Pos	Team	Pld	W	D	L	GF	GA	GD	Pts	Qualification or relegation
1	União da Madeira	26	17	3	6	53	21	+32	54	Championship Playoffs
2	Oliveirense	26	12	10	4	37	23	+14	46	
3	Camacha	26	13	6	7	42	27	+15	45	
4	Sporting de Espinho	26	12	8	6	44	30	+14	44	
5	Esmoriz	26	12	5	9	31	23	+8	41	
6	Infesta	26	10	8	8	45	42	+3	38	
7	Fiães	26	10	6	10	32	32	0	36	
8	Portosantense	26	8	11	7	24	23	+1	35	
9	Marco	26	7	10	9	31	37	−6	31	
10	Lourosa	26	8	5	13	26	36	−10	29	
11	Machico	26	7	7	12	33	45	−12	28	
12	Paredes	26	7	7	12	28	37	−9	28	Relegation to Terceira Divisão
13	Dragões Sandinenses	26	5	8	13	24	43	−19	23	Relegation to Terceira Divisão
14	União de Lamas	26	5	4	17	23	54	−31	19	Relegation to Terceira Divisão

=== Série C ===
Pos	Team	Pld	W	D	L	GF	GA	GD	Pts	Qualification or relegation
1	CD Fátima	26	18	5	3	50	17	+33	59	Championship Playoffs
2	Operário Açores	26	17	4	5	51	23	+28	55	
3	SL Nelas	26	16	4	6	38	22	+16	52	
4	SC Covilhã	26	12	7	7	40	25	+15	43	
5	GD Tourizense	26	11	8	7	36	30	+6	41	
6	SC Penalva do Castelo	26	8	10	8	23	18	+5	34	
7	FC Pampilhosa	26	9	6	11	33	34	−1	33	
8	AA Avanca	26	9	5	12	27	41	−14	32	
9	FC Madalena	26	8	6	12	25	31	−6	30	
10	Oliveira do Bairro	26	8	6	12	34	41	−7	30	
11	SC Lusitânia	26	7	6	13	31	48	−17	27	
12	SC Pombal	26	6	7	13	24	35	−11	25	Relegation to Terceira Divisão
13	AD Portomosense	26	4	10	12	21	44	−23	22	Relegation to Terceira Divisão
14	CA Mirandense	26	3	8	15	20	44	−24	17	Relegation to Terceira Divisão

=== Série D ===
Pos	Team	Pld	W	D	L	GF	GA	GD	Pts	Qualification or relegation
1	Real	26	13	7	6	46	34	+12	46	Championship Playoffs
2	Louletano DC	26	13	7	6	33	20	+13	46	
3	Atlético CP	26	12	9	5	43	24	+19	45	
4	Odivelas FC	26	12	7	7	34	27	+7	43	
5	CD Mafra	26	10	9	7	33	22	+11	39	
6	CD Pinhalnovense	26	9	11	6	34	31	+3	38	
7	Abrantes FC	26	9	8	9	25	25	0	35	
8	UD Messinense	26	9	8	9	25	30	−5	35	
9	Eléctrico	26	7	12	7	25	29	−4	33	
10	UD Rio Maior	26	8	8	10	34	31	+3	32	
11	SCU Torreense	26	8	7	11	23	27	−4	31	
12	Imortal DC	26	7	9	10	24	33	−9	30	Relegation to Terceira Divisão
13	FC Barreirense	26	6	7	13	21	33	−12	25	Relegation to Terceira Divisão
14	Estrela de Vendas Novas	26	3	3	20	10	44	−34	12	Relegation to Terceira Divisão

== Championship playoffs ==
=== Semi-finals ===
Tie no	Home team	Score	Away team
1st leg	Real	2–3	CD Fátima
2nd leg	CD Fátima	4–1	Real

Tie no	Home team	Score	Away team
1st leg	União Funchal	1–1	SC Freamunde
2nd leg	SC Freamunde	1–0	União Funchal

=== Final ===
The final was played on 26 May 2007 in Anadia.

Tie no	Team 1	Score	Team 2
Final	SC Freamunde	1–0	CD Fátima
