= Freamunde =

- Civil parish
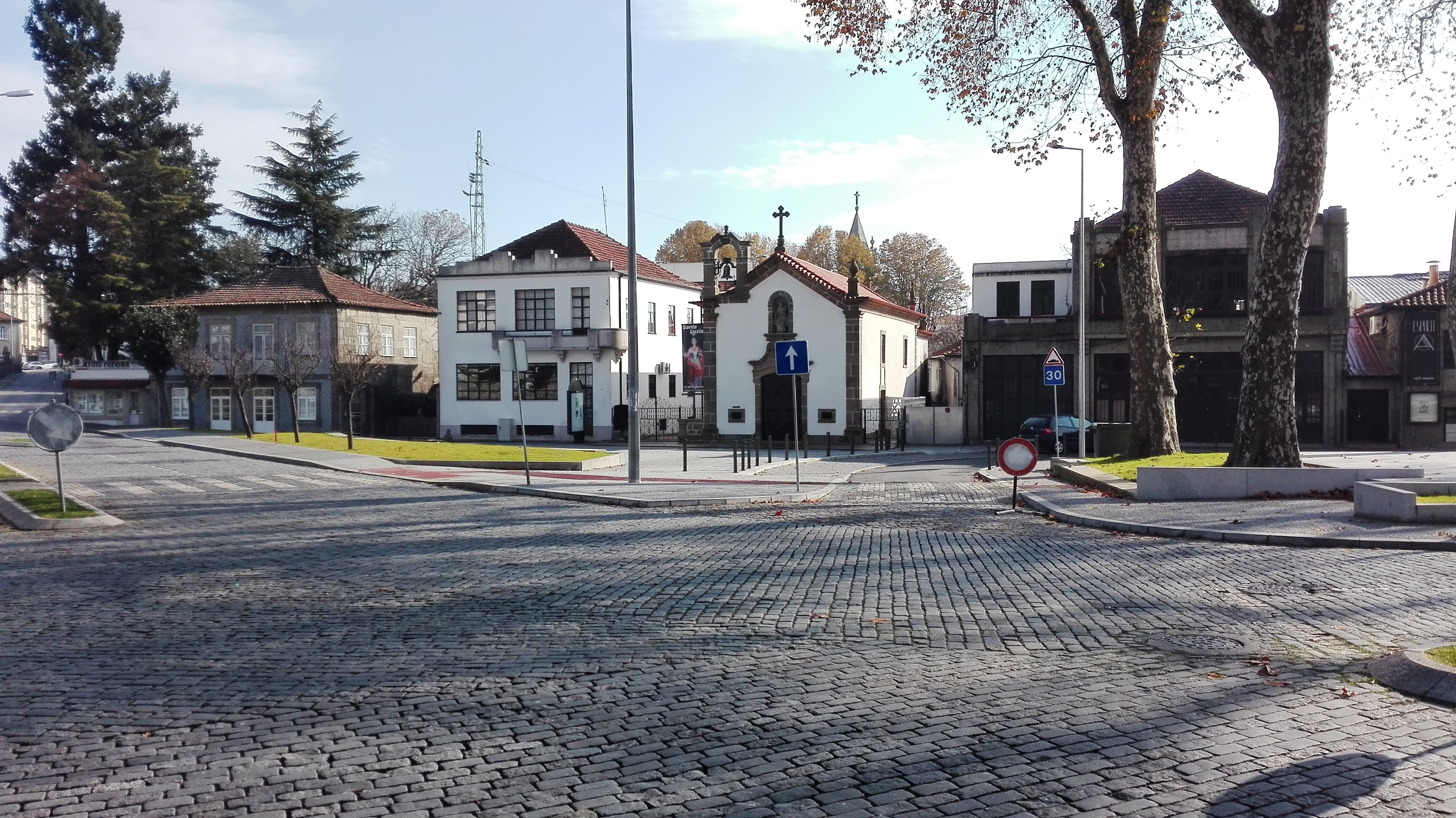

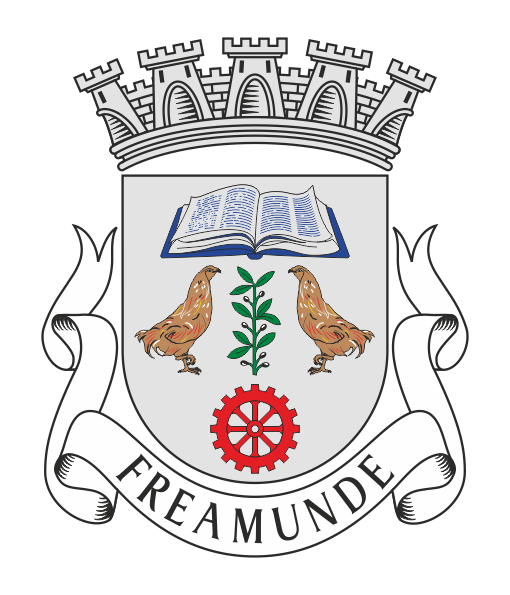
- Coat of arms

- Location in Portugal
- Coordinates: 41.289°N 8.340°W
- Country: Portugal
- Region: Norte
- Intermunic. comm.: Tâmega e Sousa
- District: Porto
- Municipality: Paços de Ferreira

Area
  - Total: 5.15 km^{2} (1.99 sq mi)

Population (2011)
  - Total: 7,789
  - Density: 1,510/km^{2} (3,920/sq mi)
- Time zone: UTC+00:00 (WET)
  - Summer (DST): UTC+01:00 (WEST)

Freamunde is a Portuguese parish in the municipality of Paços de Ferreira. The population in 2011 was 7,789, in an area of 5.15 km².

== Sports ==
The main sport in Freamunde is football, and the main team is S.C. Freamunde.
