= S.C. Freamunde =

Portuguese football club

Freamunde
- Full name: Sport Clube Freamunde
- Nickname: Os Capões (The Roosters)
- Founded: 1933; 93 years ago
- Stadium: Complexo Desportivo do SC Freamunde
- Capacity: 3,919
- Chairman: Miguel Pacheco
- Manager: Tonanha
- League: District Championship
- 2017–18: Campeonato de Portugal, 15th (relegated)
- Website: scfreamunde.com/pt/
Home colours	Away colours

Sport Clube Freamunde is a Portuguese football club based in Freamunde, Paços de Ferreira. Founded on 19 March 1933, it currently plays in the Campeonato de Portugal, holding home matches at the 3,919-capacity Complexo Desportivo do SC Freamunde.

José Bosingwa, who later achieved fame with Porto, Chelsea and the Portugal national team, began his professional career at Freamunde.

== History ==
Freamunde started when cardinal António Filipe watched a group of children playing in the streets of Freamunde, and decided to start a club, arranging for kits gratuitously. It was first called Freamunde Sport Clube.

Another clergyman, Padre Castro, was the main responsible for the club's early professional foundations. In 1933, the team started playing matches in a field owned by him, the Campo do Carvalhal. Two years later, the club started competing in Liga Invicta – known in later years as the second division – doning the colours which would last for the following decades: blue shirt and socks and white shorts. The league folded however two years later, and the team started playing in Campeonato da Promoção, after joining Porto's Football Association.

In 1944, Freamunde's first status were outlined – five years later, Castro died. In 1999, after two consecutive promotions, the club first reached the new second level, lasting two seasons, and returning again for the 2007–08 campaign after being crowned champions of the third division (Northern Zone); during the early 1990s and the 2000s, Jorge Regadas served as team manager for several seasons.

== Current squad ==
As of 27 January 2017

Note: Flags indicate national team as defined under FIFA eligibility rules; some limited exceptions apply. Players may hold more than one non-FIFA nationality.

No.	Pos.	Nation	Player
1	GK	POR	Dani
2	DF	POR	Rodolfo Lourenço
3	DF	POR	José Amadeu
4	DF	FRA	Stéphane Madeira
5	DF	POR	Rui Raínho
6	DF	GNB	Eridson
7	MF	POR	Paulo Grilo
8	FW	POR	Miguel Pedro
9	FW	POR	Diogo Ramos
10	FW	POR	Fausto
11	MF	ARG	Iván Pérez
13	GK	POR	Rui Nereu
14	FW	POR	Mohcine Hassan (on loan from Vitória de Setúbal)
15	FW	SEN	Kalidou Yero
16	DF	POR	Huguinho
17	MF	POR	Jorge Vilela

No.	Pos.	Nation	Player
18	DF	POR	João Moreira
19	FW	ARG	Claudio Salto (on loan from River Plate)
20	DF	POR	Luís Pedro
21	MF	POR	Fábio Vieira
22	DF	POR	Luís Costa
23	DF	POR	Leandro Albano
28	FW	POR	Diogo Valente
29	MF	ARG	Leandro Chaparro
30	MF	POR	Leandro Pimenta
31	DF	POR	Mika
32	MF	ARG	Maximiliano Laso
35	MF	POR	Rui Sampaio
56	FW	ARG	Sergio Hipperdinger
77	FW	CMR	Steve Ekedi (on loan from Desportivo das Aves)
99	GK	POR	Marco

== Notable players ==
- (Portugal) Pedro Barbosa

== Honours ==
- Third-tier leagues:
- Portuguese Second Division: 1998–99, 2006–07
- Campeonato Nacional de Seniores: 2013–14

== League and cup history ==
Season		Pos.	Pl.	W	D	L	GS	GA	P	Cup	League Cup	Notes
1989–90	2DS	6	34	14	12	8	45	35	40	Round 5		Promoted
1990–91	2H	15	38	13	7	18	55	69	33	Round 4		Relegated
1991–92	2DS	9	34	8	17	9	42	37	33	Round 6		
1992–93	2DS	16	32	8	10	14	32	41	26	Round 2		Relegated
1993–94	3DS	1	34	23	7	4	70	26	53	Round 3		Promoted
1994–95	2DS	12	34	11	10	13	41	45	32	Round 5		
1995–96	2DS	13	34	12	9	13	40	44	45	Round 2		
1996–97	2DS	15	34	10	10	14	32	38	40	Round 3		Relegated
1997–98	3DS	1	34	26	5	3	104	39	83	Quarter–finals		Promoted
1998–99	2DS	1	34	23	6	5	60	28	75	Round 3		Promoted
1999–00	2H	10	34	11	12	11	42	37	45	Round 4		
2000–01	2H	18	34	6	5	23	28	64	23	Round 4		Relegated
2001–02	2DS	15	38	11	13	14	44	48	46	Round 2		
2002–03	2DS	15	38	10	12	16	52	70	42	Round 6		
2003–04	2DS	9	36	14	7	15	55	45	49	Round 4		
2004–05	2DS	4	38	19	11	8	79	37	68	Round 2		
2005–06	2DS	11	26	8	9	9	25	20	33	Round 3		
2006–07	2DS	1	30	18	5	7	41	25	59	Round 3		Promoted
2007–08	2H	13	30	9	8	13	42	49	35	Round 4	Round 1	
2008–09	2H	6	28	10	7	11	30	34	37	Round 3	First Group Stage	
2009–10	2H	12	30	9	8	13	43	50	35	Round 5	Round 1	
2010–11	2H	11	30	8	13	9	37	39	37	Round 2	First Group Stage	
2011–12	2H	14	30	7	13	10	35	40	34	Round 2	First Group Stage	
2012–13	2H	22	42	7	12	23	46	76	33	Round 3	Round 2	Relegated
2013–14	CN	1	32	21	8	3	63	23	71	Round 3		Promoted
2014–15	2H	8	46	18	17	11	48	32	71	Round 5	Round 1	

Last updated: 30 July 2015
Div. = Division; 2H = Liga de Honra; 2DS = Segunda Divisão; 3DS = Terceira Divisão; CN = Campeonato Nacional
Pos. = Position; Pl = Match played; W = Win; D = Draw; L = Lost; GS = Goal scored; GA = Goal against; P = Points

== Managerial history ==
- (Portugal) Jorge Regadas (1989–1992)
- (Portugal) Jorge Regadas (1997–1998)
- (Portugal) Sá Pereira (1998)
- (Portugal) Jorge Regadas (1998–1999)
- (Portugal) Carlos Carvalhal (2000)
- (Portugal) Sá Pereira (2001–2002)
- (Portugal) João Mário (2002–2003)
- (Portugal) Nicolau Vaqueiro (2003–2004)
- (Portugal) Antero Nunes (2004–2005)
- (Portugal) Jorge Regadas (2006–2010)
- (Portugal) Nicolau Vaqueiro (2010 – June 2012)
- (Portugal) Nuno Sousa (June 2012 – October 2012)
- (Portugal) João Eusébio (October 2012 – February 2013)
- (Portugal) Jorge Regadas (February 2013 – May 2013)
- (Portugal) Carlos Pinto (June 2013– January 2016)
- (Portugal) Micael Sequeira (January 2017)
