= C.D. Fátima =

Portuguese association football club

Fátima
- Full name: Centro Desportivo de Fátima
- Nickname: The Bookings
- Founded: 1966; 60 years ago
- Ground: Estádio Papa Francisco
- Capacity: 1,545
- Chairman: (Portugal) Noel Gomes
- Manager: (Portugal) Gonçalo Carvalho
- League: Campeonato de Portugal
- 2024–25: Campeonato de Portugal, 2nd (Group C)
Home colours	Away colours

Centro Desportivo de Fátima, simply known as Fátima, is a Portuguese football club based in Fátima, in the municipality of Ourém. Founded in 1966, it holds home matches at Estádio Papa Francisco, with a capacity of 1,545 spectators.

Club's home kit is dark-red for shirt, shorts and socks, with the away one being all white.

== History ==
Former logo.

Founded on 24 January 1966, Fátima first reached the Liga de Honra in 2007, but only stayed one season there. During the season's Taça da Liga, it managed to oust FC Porto on penalties, before bowing out to another first divisioner, Sporting CP (4–4 on aggregate, and with a 2–1 away triumph).

In 2009, manager Rui Vitória led the side once again to the second level.

== Current squad ==
As of 16 June 2024

Note: Flags indicate national team as defined under FIFA eligibility rules; some limited exceptions apply. Players may hold more than one non-FIFA nationality.

No.	Pos.	Nation	Player
1	GK	POR	José Vieira
3	DF	POR	João Escoval
6	MF	POR	Gattuso
7	FW	POR	Ganso
8	MF	CPV	Marcelo Cunha
9	FW	POR	Lucas Russo
10	MF	POR	João Leal
13	FW	POR	Afonso Pereira
15	MF	POR	Rui Geadas
15	DF	POR	João Carlos
17	FW	POR	Vieirinha
19	MF	POR	Tomé Calado
20	MF	POR	Martim Santos

No.	Pos.	Nation	Player
21	FW	BRA	Yuri Martins
22	DF	POR	Rui Bento
23	DF	POR	Gui Mota
24	GK	POR	Rodrigo Belo
27	FW	POR	Tiago Rodrigues
31	GK	CMR	Evans Tetteh
33	DF	POR	Diogo Oliveira
38	MF	POR	Sandro Moço
52	MF	POR	Diogo Morgado
70	MF	POR	Afonso Castanheira
71	DF	POR	André Marques
77	DF	POR	Filipe Gabriel
80	DF	POR	Tomás Silva

== Managers ==
- (Portugal) Paulo Torres (2004 – 2006)
- (Portugal) Diamantino Miranda (2010)

== League and Cups history ==
Season	Ti.	Pos.	Pl.	W	D	L	GS	GA	P	Cup	League Cup	Notes
1997–98	4	2	38	22	12	4	69	23	78	Round 1		Promoted
1998–99	3	16	34	8	11	15	38	46	35	Round 2		Relegated
1999–00	4	1	34	23	5	6	82	26	74	Round 1		Promoted
2000–01	3	8	36	16	7	13	65	54	55	Round 4		
2001–02	3	12	38	13	8	17	47	62	47	Round 3		
2002–03	3	8	36	16	7	13	62	56	51	Round 4		
2003–04	3	6	38	16	9	13	55	57	57	Round 4		
2004–05	3	4	36	14	14	8	46	40	56	Round 4		
2005–06	3	2	26	14	8	4	41	18	50	Round 5		
2006–07	3	2	29	20	5	3	57	21	65	Round 2		Promoted
2007–08	2	16	30	5	10	15	25	41	25	Round 4	Round 4	Relegated
2008–09	3	1	20	12	6	2	33	18	42	Round 4		Promoted
2009–10	2	8	30	8	14	8	31	31	38	Round 4	Round 2	
2010–11	2	16	30	5	8	17	29	49	23	Round 3	Round 2	Relegated
2011–12	3	1	30	18	6	6	50	30	60	Round 2		
2012–13	3	8	30	13	4	13	36	31	43	Round 3		
2013–14	3	4	18	7	6	5	29	14	27	Round 3		^{[A]}
2014–15	3	8	18	3	8	7	19	27	17	Round 1		Relegated^{[B]}
2015–16	4	1	26	24	2	0	67	7	74			Promoted
2016–17	3	4 (South Promotion Group)										
2017–18	3	6 (Serie D)										
2018–19	3	11 (Serie C)										
2019–20	3	6 (Serie C)										
2020–21	3	(Withdrew)										

A. ^A Fátima's first stage fourth place finish saw them dispute a relegation playoff.
B. ^B Fátima's first stage eighth place finish saw them dispute a relegation playoff where they finished in the penultimate position and, thus, relegated.

Last updated: 18 July 2014
Div. = Division; 2 = LigaPro; 3 = Portuguese Second Division / Campeonato de Portugal; 4 = Terceira Divisão / AF Santarém First Division

Ti. = Tier; Pos. = Position; Pl = Match played; W = Win; D = Draw; L = Lost; GS = Goal scored; GA = Goal against; P = Points

== Honours ==
- Segunda Divisão: 2008–09
- Terceira Divisão: 1990–91, 1997–98, 1999–2000
- Regional League (2nd division): 1969–70
