= C.D. Trofense =

Portuguese association football club

CD Trofense
- Full name: Clube Desportivo Trofense
- Founded: 28 September 1930; 95 years ago
- Ground: Estádio CD Trofense
- Capacity: 5,017
- Chairman: Luís Lima
- Manager: Cristiano Brito
- League: Liga 3
- 2022–23: Liga Portugal 2, 17th of 18 (relegated)
- Website: www.cdtrofense.pt
Home colours	Away colours

Clube Desportivo Trofense (Portuguese pronunciation: [ˈkluβɨ ðɨʃpuɾˈtivu tɾuˈfẽsɨ]), commonly known as Trofense, is a Portuguese football club based in Trofa, Portugal. Founded in 1930, it plays in Liga 3, holding home games at Estádio do Clube Desportivo Trofense, with a capacity of 5,017 spectators.

Club colours are red and blue (related to the badge).

== History ==
In the 2005–06 season, Trofense played in the Portuguese Second Division, winning its group by six points. The club then progressed to a playoff that decided promotion to the second level, with Serie B winners A.D. Lousada; Trofense won in an emotional game, only decided on the 20th penalty, scored by goalkeeper Vítor.

In 2007–08 (having finished 11th in the league the previous season), Trofense achieved a first ever promotion to the top division, and conquered its second piece of silverware, winning by a small margin over Rio Ave FC (the first four teams were separated by just two points).

On 4 January 2009, Trofense managed a historical home win, beating S.L. Benfica 2–0, courtesy of Reguila and FC Porto loanee Hélder Barbosa, that then placed the side above the relegation zone. The following week, it achieved a 0–0 draw at the Estádio do Dragão against Porto, but the club would be eventually relegated.

== Current squad ==
As of 20 September 2026

Note: Flags indicate national team as defined under FIFA eligibility rules; some limited exceptions apply. Players may hold more than one non-FIFA nationality.

No.	Pos.	Nation	Player
1	GK	POR	Ricardo Moura
3	DF	BRA	Luccão
4	DF	POR	João Vale (on loan from Leixões)
6	MF	POR	Saná Ufala
7	DF	POR	Joel Oliveira (on loan from Leixões)
8	MF	POR	Pedro Teixeira
9	FW	BRA	Kevyn
11	FW	POR	Kiki
17	FW	BRA	Luis Miguel
21	DF	POR	Tomás Oliveira
22	MF	BRA	Matheus Claudino
23	FW	BRA	Juninho
25	DF	STP	Samuca
28	MF	POR	Diogo Nunes

No.	Pos.	Nation	Player
30	FW	POR	Feliz
31	GK	GBS	Manuel Baldé
32	FW	ANG	Jefer Gunjo (on loan from Leixões)
39	FW	BRA	Kauã Souza
50	DF	POR	Tiago Silva
65	MF	POR	André Gomes
70	DF	POR	Rafa Peixoto
83	DF	POR	Wilson Oliveira
89	FW	POR	Nuninho
—	DF	BRA	Emerson Buiu
—	DF	URU	Agustín Granja
—	MF	USA	Cristián Morán
—	FW	PAR	Jorge López

== Honours ==
- Segunda Liga
  - Champions (1): 2007–08
- Campeonato de Portugal
  - Champions (1): 2020–21
- Terceira Divisão
  - Champions (1): 1991–92

== Managerial history ==
- (Portugal) José Domingos (1993–1994)
- (Portugal) Nicolau Vaqueiro (1994)
- (Portugal) Sá Pereira (1995–1996)
- (Portugal) Nicolau Vaqueiro (1996–1999)
- (Portugal) Jorge Regadas (1999–2000)
- (Portugal) Maki (2003–2005)
- (Portugal) Daniel Ramos (2005–2007)
- (Portugal) Toni (2007–2008)
- (Portugal) Tulipa (2008–2009)
- (Portugal) Vítor Oliveira (2009–2010)
- (Portugal) Daniel Ramos (2010)
- (Portugal) Porfírio Amorim (2010–2011)
- (Portugal) António Sousa (2011)
- (Portugal) João Eusébio (2011–2012)
- (Portugal) Professor Neca (2012)
- (Portugal) Micael Sequeira (2012–2013)
- (Portugal) Luís Diogo (2013)
- (Portugal) Porfírio Amorim (2014–2015)
- (Portugal) Vítor Oliveira (2015–2016)
- (Portugal) Bruno Pereira (2016–2017)
- (Portugal) Hélder Pereira (2018–2019)
- (Portugal) Rui Matos (2019)
- (Portugal) Rui Duarte (2020–2021)
- (Portugal) Francisco Chaló (2021–2022)
- (Portugal) Jorge Casquilha (2022–)

== League and cup history ==
Season	Div.	Pos.	Pl.	W	D	L	GS	GA	P	Cup	League Cup	Notes
1990–91	2DS	15	38	13	12	13	45	46	38	Round 5		Relegated
1991–92	3DS	1	34	26	3	5	73	24	55	Round 3		Promoted
1992–93	2DS	15	32	8	11	13	31	43	27	Round 5		Relegated
1993–94	3DS	3	34	16	13	5	61	24	45	Quarter-finals		
1994–95	3DS	8	34	13	8	13	43	40	34	Round 2		
1995–96	3DS	4	34	16	5	13	47	37	53	Round 2		
1996–97	3DS	1	34	21	8	5	81	30	71	Round 4		Promoted
1997–98	2DS	3	34	16	9	9	53	34	57	Round 3		
1998–99	2DS	4	34	17	11	6	49	33	62	Round 2		
1999–00	2DS	10	38	12	8	14	47	53	44	Round 3		
2000–01	2DS	18	32	10	11	17	35	53	41	Round 2		Relegated
2001–02	3DS	4	34	15	10	7	50	33	55	Round 1		
2002–03	3DS	2	36	20	10	6	58	32	70	Round 4		Promoted
2003–04	2DS	5	36	15	10	11	51	46	55	Round 2		
2004–05	2DS	15	38	13	10	15	46	48	49	Round 3		
2005–06	2DS	1	26	15	7	4	44	22	52	Round 3		Promoted
2006–07	2H	11	30	9	9	12	27	26	36	Round 3		
2007–08	2H	1	30	13	13	4	35	22	52	Round 3	Round 2	Promoted
2008–09	1D	16	30	5	17	5	25	42	24	Round 5	Round 2	Relegated
2009–10	2H	6	30	13	11	6	44	45	45	Round 2	Second Group Stage	
2010–11	2H	3	30	15	6	9	41	27	54	Round 2	First Group Stage	
2011–12	2H	7	30	11	6	13	36	45	39	Round 3	First Group Stage	
2012–13	2H	19	42	9	13	20	41	60	40	Round 2	First Group Stage	
2013–14	2H	19	42	11	14	17	36	61	47	Round 3	First Group Stage	
2014–15	2H	24	46	9	9	28	35	81	36	Round 4	Round 2	Relegated
2015–16	CP	5	32	10	10	12	41	45	42	Round 4		
2016–17	CP	5	32	13	7	12	53	39	46	Round 3		
2017–18	CP	9	30	12	6	12	34	35	42	Round 2		
2018–19	CP	4	32	20	7	5	60	24	67	Round 2		
2019–20	CP	12	25	8	6	11	24	30	30	Round 1		Season unfinished
2020–21	CP	1	25	14	8	3	27	9	50	Round 3		Promoted
2021–22	2H	13	34	10	10	14	35	41	40	Round 3	Round 1	
2022–23	2H											

Last updated: 13 August 2022
Div. = Division; 1D = Portuguese League; 2H = Liga de Honra; CP = Campeonato de Portugal 2DS = Segunda Divisão; 3DS = Terceira Divisão
Pos. = Position; Pl = Match played; W = Win; D = Draw; L = Lost; GS = Goal scored; GA = Goal against; P = Points
