= Maia Municipal Chamber =

Legislative body of Maia

Coordinates: 41.23339°N 8.62239°W

Maia Municipal Chamber Câmara Municipal da Maia
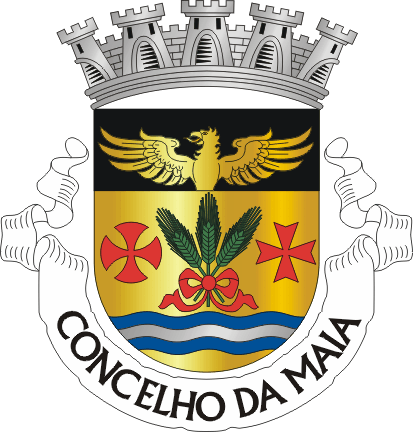
- Coat of arms of the municipality of Maia

Type
- Type: Câmara municipal
- Term limits: 3

History
- Founded: 15 December 1519; 506 years ago

Leadership
- President: António Silva Tiago, PSD since 20 October 2021
- Vice President: Emília de Fátima Moreira dos Santos, PSD since 20 October 2021

Structure
- Seats: 11
- Political groups: Municipal Executive (6) PSD (6) Opposition (5) PS (5)
- Length of term: Four years

Elections
- Last election: 26 September 2021
- Next election: Sometime between 22 September and 14 October 2025

Meeting place
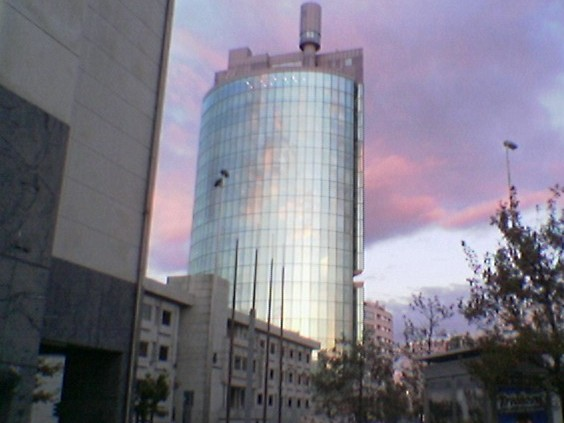
- Paços do Concelho da Maia

Website
- www.cm-maia.pt

The Maia Municipal Chamber (Portuguese: Câmara Municipal da Maia) is the administrative authority in the municipality of Maia. It has 10 freguesias in its area of jurisdiction and is based in the city of Maia, on the Porto District. These freguesias are: Águas Santas, Castêlo da Maia, Cidade da Maia, Folgosa, Milheirós, Moreira, Nogueira e Silva Escura, Pedrouços, São Pedro Fins and Vila Nova da Telha.

The Maia City Council is made up of 11 councillors, representing, currently, two different political forces. The first candidate on the list with the most votes in a municipal election or, in the event of a vacancy, the next candidate on the list, takes office as President of the Municipal Chamber.

== Heraldry ==
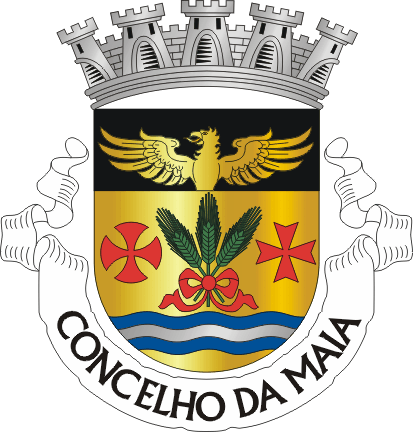
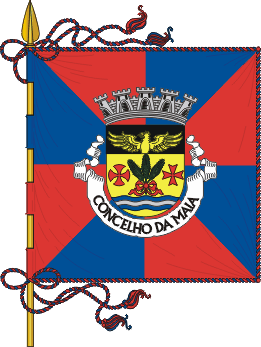
Coat of Arms and Flag of Maia

The coat of arms consists in a shield of gold, bundled by three ears of wheat in green tied in red between a Knights Templar cross and a Maltese cross, both in red, a chief in black with a gold eagle protruding and a small campaign wavy in blue charged with a silver wavy burette. In the top there’s a mural silver crown with five towers. In the bottom there’s a white stripe with the legend in black: "Concelho da Maia".

The flag of the municipality consists in an eight-piece gyronade in blue and red. The different designs might include a blue and red cord and tassels or an old shaft and spear.

== List of the Presidents of the Municipal Chamber of Maia ==
- Jorge da Costa Catarino – (1976–1979)
- José Vieira de Carvalho – (1979–2002)
- Bragança Fernandes – (2002–2017)
- António Silva Tiago – (2017–2025)

(The list is incomplete)
