= F.C. Pedras Rubras =

Portuguese association football club

Pedras Rubras
- Full name: Futebol Clube Pedras Rubras
- Nickname: Aviadores (Airmen)
- Founded: 1941; 85 years ago
- Ground: Estádio do FC Pedras Rubras
- Capacity: 5.000
- Chairman: Alfredo Santos
- Manager: Fernando Pereira
Home colours	Away colours

F.C. Pedras Rubras is a Portuguese football club based in the town of Pedras Rubras, a parish of Maia, in the region of Greater Porto.

== Brief history ==
Founded in 1942, the club is seen as a good formation center, and eventually signed protocols with Leixões S.C. and topflight club F.C. Porto. Normally a mid-table club in the country's third division, it dropped down a level in 2005–06.

After a very good year in the following campaign, albeit without promotion, Pederas Rubras were again relegated in 2007–08, to the Portuguese District Football Associations.

== Current squad ==
As of 27 August 2019

Note: Flags indicate national team as defined under FIFA eligibility rules; some limited exceptions apply. Players may hold more than one non-FIFA nationality.

No.	Pos.	Nation	Player
4	DF	POR	Filipe Relvas
5	DF	POR	Bernardo Fonseca
6	MF	POR	Tiago Moura
8	MF	POR	César Gomes
9	FW	CMR	Dibola Júnior
10	MF	POR	Ricardo Cardoso
11	FW	WAL	Danny Barrow
13	DF	POR	Carlos Mendes
12	GK	POR	Jorge Costa
20	FW	GNB	Aliu Ronaldo
21	FW	BRA	Erik
23	MF	POR	Rui Lima

No.	Pos.	Nation	Player
25	DF	POR	Ricardo Portilho
27	DF	POR	Esteves
30	MF	POR	Rui Jorge
31	GK	POR	André Fonseca
77	FW	BRA	Matheus
92	MF	MNE	Uroš Smolović
—	DF	POR	Kiko
—	DF	BRA	Fabricio Manoel
—	DF	POR	Gonçalo Pimenta
—	MF	BRA	Filipe Mello
—	FW	POR	Tiago Silva
—	FW	BRA	Matheus Gomes

== Notable players ==
- (Martinique) Grégory Arnolin
- (Cape Verde) Hernâni
- (Portugal) José Maria Pedroto (youth)
