= Gil Vicente F.C. =

Portugal association football team

Gil Vicente
- Full name: Gil Vicente Futebol Clube
- Nicknames: Gilistas (Gilists/Followers of Gil); Galos (Roosters)
- Founded: 3 May 1924; 102 years ago
- Stadium: Estádio Cidade de Barcelos
- Capacity: 12,046
- President: Rui Silva
- Head coach: Luís Pinto
- League: Primeira Liga
- 2025–26: Primeira Liga, 6th of 18
- Website: gilvicentefc.pt
Home colours	Away colours

Gil Vicente Futebol Clube (Portuguese pronunciation: [ˈʒil viˈsẽtɨ]), commonly known as Gil Vicente, founded in 1924, is a Portuguese professional football club that plays in Barcelos. It plays their home matches at the Estádio Cidade de Barcelos. It competes in the Primeira Liga, the top division of football in the country, and it is named after Portuguese playwright Gil Vicente.

The club's founding occurred near the city's theater named after playwright Vicente. It first played in Primeira Liga in 1990–91. Since then, the team has been relegated to the second tier three times, having won back promotion twice by winning the Segunda Liga and once by administrative decision. The highest league finishes were two fifth-places in 1999–2000 and 2021–22. A women's football team was created for the 2018–19 season. The team has participated in the top tier, and currently has played six straight seasons in it.

== History ==
=== Early years ===
Gil Vicente Futebol Clube was founded on 3 May 1924, after the creation of other short-lived clubs in Barcelos, such as Barcellos Sporting Club and União Foot-ball Club Barcellense. A group of friends who would gather in the theater square (Largo do Teatro, currently Largo Doutor Martins Lima), naming the club after the theater, itself named after the Portuguese playwright. The initial name of the club was Gil Vicente Football Barcelense, including a mention of its city that was lost through time. Despite the foundation in 1924, only in 1931 did the club register in the Braga Football Association, participating in the following year in the district league after the city cup against Barcelos Sporting Club.

In 1943 (possibly 1953), the club is promoted to the Second Division, and one year later stops participating in the regional championship to play in a national league starting.

The first record of a game abroad is in April 1953 against Tuy Racing Club.

Gil Vicente achieved a club record semi-final in the Portuguese Cup in 1976–77, losing against S.C. Braga only after a replay match. In the following edition, the club reached the quarter-finals, losing against FC Porto.

=== Ascent to top tier ===
In the 1980s Gil Vicente improved and reached two third places in the North section of the second division. In 1989–90 Segunda Divisão, led by Rodolfo Reis, the team finally achieved promotion to the top tier, winning the North Zone and obtaining a second place in the championship-playoff against Salgueiros and Farense. Despite the success, the season is marked by a controversial decision. An electrical failure in an away match at Maia during a 2–0 Gil Vicente lead with 16 minutes left led to the game being interrupted. The Portuguese Football Federation first awards Gil Vicente a 3–0 win and fines Maia, but the decision would later be changed and the clubs were ordered to repeat the entire match, something which the club claims was inconsistent with another decision in the same year.

In 1990-91, the first season in the top tier, Gil Vicente narrowly avoided relegation. There were 20 participants, with 5 relegation spots, due to a planned decreased to 18 clubs. Gil Vicente finished 13-th with 33 points, the same as relegated Tirsense. The compact Estádio Adelino Ribeiro Novo proved to be a tough spot for visitors, as only champions S.L. Benfica and runner-ups FC Porto able to win.

For 1991-92, the club hired former FC Porto and Sporting CP legend António Oliveira as a manager. The club finished 13th again, 2 points clear of relegation. Relegation was avoided with a 1–0 win over already-crowned champions FC Porto with a goal scored by Morato. Another highlight was reaching the quarter-finals of the Cup, losing to Boavista 1–0 at home.

Vítor Oliveira was hired to managed the team for the 1992-93 campaign. Gil Vicente had a tough start, losing three of the first four matches, including a 7–1 thrashing at Marítimo. The season recovered and the team went on to take a home win and an away draw against eventual third-placed Sporting CP and a home draw against runner-ups S.L. Benfica. The team finished a club record ninth, 3 points clear of relegation. Ljubinko Drulović was the team's star, scoring 10 goals. He would be transferred to Porto in the Winter of the following season, featuring in all of the teams who won the historic five consecutive league titles.

Oliveira was kept for the following two campaigns. In 1993-94, Gil Vicente finished tenth, 5 points of relegation. Highlights include one away and two home draws against the eventual top 3 teams. Home games were again a team strength, with only Porto and Benfica achieving fewer than 2 losses. In 1994-95, the team struggled more. It achieved only 7 wins, tied for third-worst in the league. Despite this, its league-leading 13 draws were enough to secure 13th, 3 points clear of relegation. Surprisingly, two of the seven wins came against runner-ups Benfica, both 1–0. The home win was ensured with a stoppage penalty scored by Tuck while the away win goal was scored by Congolese striker Makopoloka Mangonga.

For 1995-96, the club hired manager Bernardino Pedroto. The team struggled early, with only 4 points in the first 7 games in the first season where a win was worth 3 points. The form recovered and three well-time consecutive March wins helped achieve 12th place, 3 points clear of relegation. This was the season where hometown player Carlitos established himself in the first teamm, playing 33 league games and scoring 5 goals, both team-leading statistics.

=== Relegation and return ===
The 1996-97 was disastrous and the team finished bottom of the league with 19 points, 11 points behind the closest opponent. Pedroto was replaced after the a 1–0 away loss against Espinho in December, achieving only 4 points in the first 12 games. Incoming manager Fernando Festas achieved only one win before being replaced in March after a 4–1 away loss against Chaves. Assistant coach José Marconi led the team until the end of the season, taking two wins in the last 10 games, but coaching the team through its worst defeat in the top tier: a 7–0 away loss at Boavista.

In 1997-98, Henrique Nunes was hired to manage the team. Gil Vicente achieved the fourth position in the league, 2 points behind promoted Alverca. The club actually celebrated promotion at one point, as Alverca were a satellite club of S.L. Benfica, and thus forbidden from promotion to the top tier according to the relegation. As the season approached, Alverca, at the time led by future S.L. Benfica chairman Luís Filipe Vieira asked to be removed of the satellite status a few weeks before the end of the season. The request was approved by the Portuguese Football Federation and Gil Vicente would remain in the second tier for another season despite a court appeal.

In 1998-99 Gil Vicente finally obtained its first national silverware. The team won the Second Division with 68 points, 7 points clear of second place. Led by Álvaro Magalhães and with goal scoring forwards Almami Moreira and Diocleciano Tavares, both with 12 goals, the team also had a highlight 3–2 home win against Sporting CP in the fourth round of the Portuguese Cup. The club celebrated the promotion and its 75th birthday with a friendly against S.L. Benfica in June 1999.

Magalhães remained at the helm as Gil Vicente obtained a club record Primeira Liga fifth place in the 1999–2000 season, which would have been enough for a UEFA Cup spot in the previous season. The team was also a protagonist of the last matchday. Already out of contention for the fourth place, the team hosted FC Porto, who was 1 point behind leaders Sporting CP, who were on an 18-year spell without a league title. Gil Vicente beat FC Porto 2–1 with goals by Lemos, Carlitos and former player Drulović.

In the following two seasons, the club returned to more typical league finishes in the bottom half of the table. Vítor Oliveira returned to manage the club in December 2001, taking over the job of Luís Campos. In the 2002-03 season the team achieved eighth place with 44 points. The season included 2 wins against Sporting, including a 3–0 away win at Estádio José Alvalade, with goals from Manoel, Gaspar, and Paulo Alves. In February 2003, Luís Loureiro became the first squad player to be receive a call up to the Portugal national football team.

In the following two seasons, Gil Vicente achieved consecutive 12th and 13th places, with 40 points, both seasons marked by coaching changes: from Mário Reis to Luís Campos and then to Ulisses Morais.

In the 2005–06 Primeira Liga, Gil Vicente fielded an ineligible player being Angolan forward Mateus in the "Mateus Affair". They therefore lost the right to participate in the 2006–07 Primeira Liga, and Belenenses were allowed to stay up. Gil Vicente were accused by the special sports instances that rule Portuguese football of illegally resorting to regular courts on the dispute of Mateus, according to Gil Vicente, illegal contract with his former employer, FC Lixa.

Still convinced this is not a sports-related case but rather work-related, Gil Vicente continued in the courts. Along with the relegation, they were also suspended from the Taça de Portugal for one season.

On 29 May 2011, the club returned to the top flight as champions of the 2010–11 Liga de Honra with a 3–1 home win over C.D. Fátima in front of a club record crowd; manager Paulo Alves beat C.D. Feirense on goal difference to the title, and the key players were strikers Hugo Vieira and Zé Luís. The club finished as runners-up of the 2011–12 Taça da Liga, eliminating Sporting CP from the groups, S.C. Braga on penalties in the semi-final and losing 2–1 to S.L. Benfica in the final in Coimbra.

A four-year spell in the top flight ended in 2014–15, when Gil Vicente lost 2–1 at F.C. Penafiel in the penultimate round of matches. On 29 April 2018, the club slipped into the third tier for the first time since 1971, but had a place in the 2019–20 Primeira Liga secured as a result of the appeal against the "Matheus Affair". On May 8, 2022, Gil Vicente qualified for a European competition for the first time in their history, after finishing fifth in the 2021–22 Primeira Liga season. They played UEFA Europa Conference League, eliminating Riga FC from Latvia in the third round (5–1 overall), before being eliminated in the playoff by AZ Alkmaar from the Netherlands (1–6 overall).

=== Other sports ===
While today only the football section exists, Gil Vicente has had a roller hockey team, and athletes representing the club in cycling and pedestrianism.

== Stadium ==
The clubs that preceded Gil Vicente had their first games in Campo da Feira and in Campo Dom Carlos (today's Campo 25 de Abril). União Foot-ball Club Barcelense had its first field in Campo da Granja, next to the city's cemetery, playing its first game on April 30, 1922, against Desportivo Famalicense, 3 days before the official inauguration during the city festival (Festa das Cruzes) with a game between FC Porto and SC Salgueiros. Eleven years later, in May 1933, with the decline of its rival club, Gil Vicente took over the field. The first struggles of the young team were mainly about finding a pitch to play. Back then, the team would play in the Campo da Estação (Station Field), which belonged to another club, Triunfo Sport Club. On 3 May 1933, Gil Vicente played on its first field, Campo da Granja, against neighbours S.C. Braga.

On 16 September 1945, goalkeeper Adelino Ribeiro Novo died in Campo da Granja after a collision with an opponent during a match against CD Aves. In January 1946, the field was renamed after him as a tribute. On 8 November 1987, the city donated the stadium to Gil Vicente and the club inaugurates its new headquarters. It currently hosts the clubs youth squads, as well as training sessions and friendly games.

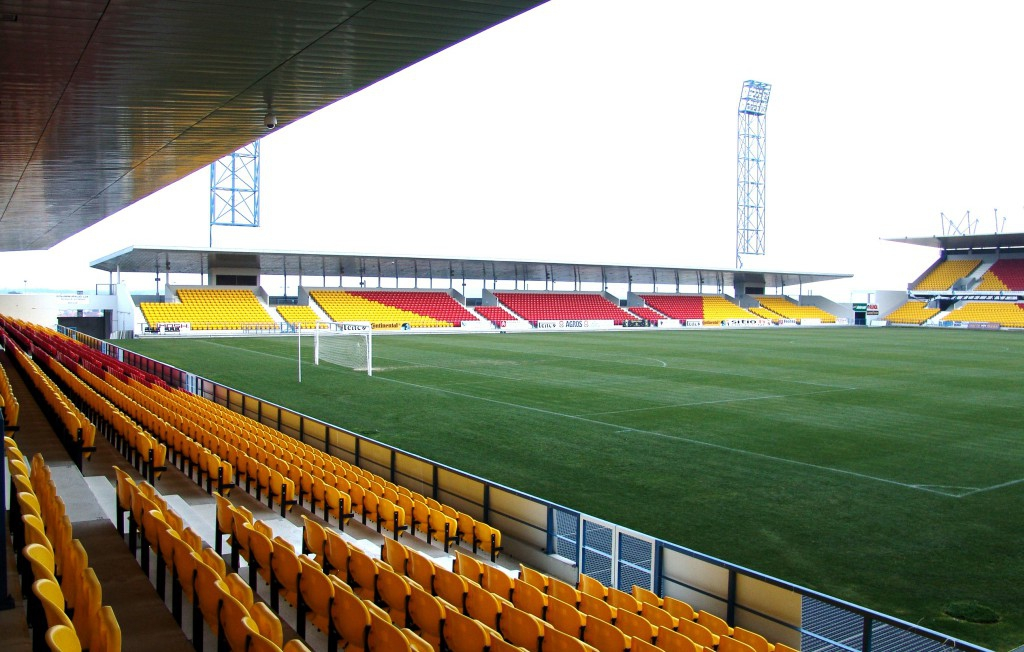
Estádio Cidade de Barcelos

In 1992, the city bought land in the parish of Vila Boa, Barcelos to build a new stadium. Construction for the new Estádio Cidade de Barcelos began in 2001 and in 2002 the first stand was built. The stadium cost 22 million euro. The stadium was inaugurated on 30 May 2004 with a friendly between Gil Vicente and Uruguayan club Club Nacional de Football, ending with a 2–1 loss for the home team, with goals by O.J. Morales, Chory Castro, and Paulo Alves. The first official match was a 0–1 loss against Boavista F.C. on 10 September 2004, with Zé Manel scoring the first official goal. The first Gil Vicente win came two weeks later on September 26, with a 3–1 win over Moreirense F.C., with hometown player Carlitos scoring the first official goal for Gil Vicente in the new stadium. Since then, the Cidade de Barcelos has hosted a friendly game between the Portugal and Canada, as well as 2 group stage games of the UEFA Under-21 European Championship. In 2022, the city contracted the construction of two training pitches adjacent to the stadium for 2.3 million Euro, one grass and another artificial turf, which were completed in 2024.

== Colours and crest ==
The club's first kit was red. Later kits were green and white horizontally striped, yellow and red (colours of the city), and blue. The club's modern main kit is usually red, while alternative kits vary, but are usually blue and white.

== Honours ==
- Segunda Liga
  - Winners (2): 1998–99, 2010–11

== League and cup history ==
Season	Div.	Pos.	Pl.	W	D	L	GS	GA	P	Cup	League Cup	Notes
1989–90	2D	1	34	22	5	7	51	25	49	Round 5		Promoted
1990–91	1D	13	38	11	11	16	34	46	33	Round 5		
1991–92	1D	13	34	11	7	16	26	42	29	Quarter-finals		
1992–93	1D	9	34	12	7	15	34	42	31	Round 4		
1993–94	1D	10	34	10	11	13	27	47	31	Round 4		
1994–95	1D	13	34	7	13	14	30	40	27	Round 4		
1995–96	1D	12	34	9	9	16	31	49	36	Round 4		
1996–97	1D	18	34	4	7	23	29	74	19	Round 4		Relegated
1997–98	2H	4	34	16	12	6	44	23	60	Quarter-finals		
1998–99	2H	1	34	20	8	6	58	24	68	Quarter-finals		Promoted
1999–00	1D	5	34	14	11	9	48	34	53	Quarter-finals		^{[A]}
2000–01	1D	14	34	10	7	17	34	41	37	Quarter-finals		
2001–02	1D	12	34	10	8	16	42	56	38	Round 4		
2002–03	1D	8	34	13	5	16	42	53	44	Round 5		
2003–04	1D	12	34	10	10	14	43	40	40	Round 4		
2004–05	1D	13	34	11	7	16	34	40	40	Round 4		
2005–06	1D	12	34	11	7	16	37	42	40	Round 4		^{[B]}
2006–07	2H	12	30	12	9	9	27	27	36			^{[C]}
2007–08	2H	4	30	13	11	6	43	34	50	Quarter-finals	Round 1	
2008–09	2H	9	30	8	14	8	36	37	38	Quarter-finals	Second Group Stage	
2009–10	2H	10	30	9	11	10	36	32	38	Round 4	First Group Stage	
2010–11	2H	1	30	15	10	5	55	38	55	Round 3	Second Group Stage	Promoted
2011–12	1D	9	30	8	10	12	31	42	34	Round 3	Runners-up	
2012–13	1D	13	30	6	7	17	31	54	25	Quarter-finals	Second round	
2013–14	1D	13	30	8	7	15	23	37	31	Fifth round	Third round	
2014–15	1D	17	34	4	11	19	25	60	23	Quarter-finals	Third round	Relegated
2015–16	2H	11	46	16	14	16	58	56	62	Semi-finals	First round	
2016–17	2H	13	42	13	17	12	47	49	56	Third round	Second round	
2017–18	2H	19	38	8	12	18	29	45	36	Second round	Second round	Relegated
2018–19	CP	10	34	22	4	8	—	—	—	Second round		Court ordered promotion to Primeira Liga
2019–20	1D	10	34	11	10	13	40	44	43	Fourth round	Group stage	
2020–21	1D	11	34	11	6	17	33	42	39	Quarter-finals		
2021–22	1D	5	34	13	12	9	47	42	48	Fourth round	Second round	
2022–23	1D	13	34	10	7	17	32	41	37	Fourth round	Quarter-finals	UEFA Europa Conference League Play-off round
2023–24	1D	12	34	9	9	16	42	52	36	Quarter-finals	First round	

A. ^A Best league classification finish in the club's history.
B. ^B Despite finishing twelfth, the club was relegated due to fielding an ineligible player during the 2005–06 Primeira Liga season.
C. ^C The team at the start of the season was docked nine points due to its involvement in fielding an ineligible player in the previous season. The team was also suspended from the Taça de Portugal for one season.

Last updated: 17 July 2012
Div. = Division; 1D = Portuguese League; 2H = Liga de Honra; 2D = Portuguese Second Division; CP = Campeonato de Portugal

Pos. = Position; Pl = Match played; W = Win; D = Draw; L = Lost; GS = Goal scored; GA = Goal against; P = Points

== European record ==
=== UEFA club competition record ===
Season	Tournament	Round	Opponent	Home	Away	Agg
2022–23	UEFA Europa Conference League	Third Qualification round	(Latvia) Riga FC	4–0	1–1	5–1
2022–23	UEFA Europa Conference League	Playoff round	(Netherlands) AZ Alkmaar	1–2	0–4	1–6

=== UEFA coefficient ===
Correct as of 21 May 2025.

Rank	Team	Points
128	(Finland) HJK Helsinki	12.500
129	(Portugal) F.C. Arouca	12.453
130	(Portugal) Gil Vicente F.C.	12.453
131	(Portugal) C.D. Santa Clara	12.453
132	(Portugal) F.C. Paços de Ferreira	12.453

== Players ==
=== Current squad ===
As of 10 September 2026

Note: Flags indicate national team as defined under FIFA eligibility rules; some limited exceptions apply. Players may hold more than one non-FIFA nationality.

No.	Pos.	Nation	Player
1	GK	SWE	André Picornell
2	DF	POR	José Silva
3	DF	ESP	Antonio Espigares
4	DF	FRA	Marvin Elimbi (captain)
6	MF	POR	Zé Carlos
7	FW	FRA	Tidjany Touré
8	MF	CIV	Mohamed Bamba
9	FW	BRA	Walace França
10	MF	ESP	Santi García
11	FW	POR	Joelson Fernandes
12	MF	DEN	Andreas Lausen
17	FW	ESP	Sergio Bermejo
19	MF	BRA	Guilherme Gomes
20	MF	POR	Gil Martins
23	FW	ESP	Héctor Hernández

No.	Pos.	Nation	Player
26	DF	BRA	Weverson
27	FW	URU	Agustín Moreira
30	GK	BRA	Lucão
32	MF	URU	Martín Fernández
39	DF	ANG	Jonathan Buatu (captain)
44	GK	POR	Tiago Ferreira
45	DF	CPV	David Moreira
47	DF	POR	Ricardo Esgaio
77	FW	BRA	Murilo Costa
82	MF	POR	Gonçalo Maia
86	MF	POR	Diogo Prioste (on loan from Benfica B)
88	MF	PER	Bassco Soyer
94	GK	BRA	Samuel Portugal
95	DF	FRA	Arthur Tchaptchet
99	FW	MLI	Mohamed Kaba

=== Out on loan ===
Note: Flags indicate national team as defined under FIFA eligibility rules; some limited exceptions apply. Players may hold more than one non-FIFA nationality.

No.	Pos.	Nation	Player
—	DF	POR	Diogo Costa (on loan at Amarante until 30 June 2027)
—	MF	POR	Rodrigo Melro (on loan at Vianense until 30 June 2027)

No.	Pos.	Nation	Player
—	FW	BRA	Carlos Eduardo (on loan at Sabah until 30 June 2027)

== Gil Vicente Managers ==
Position	Name
Global Sports Director	(Portugal) Pedro Albergaria
Director of Football	(Portugal) Manuel Ribeiro
Manager	(Portugal) César Peixoto
Assistant Manager	(England) Sá Pereira
First-Team Coach	(Portugal) Rui Santos (Portugal) Tiago Sousa
Goalkeeping Coach	(Portugal) César Gomes
Conditioning Coach	(Portugal) José Barbosa
Athletic Coach	(Portugal) José Mário Rocha
Match Analyst	(Portugal) Rafael Vieira

== Notable former players ==
As of 1 July 2024

List criteria

- player has played 100 games for the club in the Portuguese top flight,
- player has scored 15 goals for the club in the Portuguese top flight.
- played at least one top flight game for the club and won an international title while playing for the club
- played in a FIFA World Cup or senior continental competition while playing for the club
- played for the Portugal national football team while playing for the club

Player currently in the squad.

Positions key
GK	Goalkeeper
DF	Defender
MF	Midfielder
FW	Forward

Name	Nationality	Position	Gil Vicente Primeira Liga record (Note: Career years given in full seasons and may not be entirely correct if the player made a late season debut or an early season retirement. Includes only Primeira Liga seasons.)			Achievements
Name	Nationality	Position	Seasons	Apps	Goals	Achievements
Paulo Jorge	(Portugal) (Angola)	GK	1999–2006	200	0	Best result (5th, 1999–2000); 1998-99 Second division champion
Tuck	(Portugal)	MF	1990–1997	187	11	
Jorge Casquilha	(Portugal)	MF	1999–2005	176	11	Best result (5th, 1999–2000); 1998-99 Second division champion
Miguel	(Portugal)	DF	1991–1997	164	9	
Rúben Fernandes	(Portugal)	DF	2019–	151	4	Best result (5th, 2021–2022); Played in the 2022–23 UEFA Europa Conference League
Lemos	(Brazil) (Portugal)	DF	1994–1997; 1999–2002	149	8	Best result (5th, 1999–2000)
Carlitos	(Portugal)	MF	1994–1997; 1999–2000; 2004–2006	141	23	Best result (5th, 1999–2000)
Mangonga	(Democratic Republic of the Congo)	FW	1990–1995	132	27	Club former record top flight goalscorer
Kanya Fujimoto	(Japan)	MF	2020-	132	7	Best result (5th, 2021–2022); Played in the 2022–23 UEFA Europa Conference League
Adriano Facchini	(Brazil)	GK	2011–2015	119	0	2011–12 League Cup finalist
Luís Coentrão	(Portugal)	MF	2002–2006	118	7	
Fernando Rosado	(Portugal)	MF	1990–1994	115	6	
Paulo Alves	(Portugal)	FW	1990–1991; 2001–2005	111	28	Club former record top flight goalscorer 1989 FIFA World Youth Champion
Nuno Amaro	(Portugal)	DF	2000–2005	108	4	
Nandinho	(Portugal)	FW	2002–2006	104	13	
Braíma	(Guinea-Bissau)	MF	2002–2006	104	2	
Samuel Lino	(Brazil)	FW	2019–2022	87	23	Best result (5th, 2021–2022)
Luís Loureiro	(Portugal)	MF	2001–2004	85	10	First Portugal national team cap while club player
Wilson	(Angola) (Portugal)	DF	1994–1997	84	2	1998-99 Second division champion Played in the 1996 African Cup of Nations
Hugo Vieira	(Portugal)	FW	2011–2014; 2019–2020	67	18	2011–12 League Cup finalist 2010–11 Second League champion
Fran Navarro	(Spain)	FW	2021–2023	66	33	Club record top flight goalscorer Best result (5th, 2021–2022); Played in the 2022–23 UEFA Europa Conference League
Manoel	(Brazil)	FW	2001–2003	60	15	
Capucho	(Portugal)	MF	1990–1992	50	3	1991 FIFA World Youth Champion
Ljubinko Drulović	(Socialist Federal Republic of Yugoslavia)	FW	1992–1994	44	17	
Jorge Ribeiro	(Portugal)	DF	2004–2005	14	0	Portugal national team cap while club player
Mateus	(Angola)	FW	2005–2006	4	2	Played in the 2006 FIFA World Cup

== Managerial history ==
- (Portugal) José Maria Furtado (1974–75)
- (Portugal) Vieira Nunes (1 July 1981 –22 March 1982)
- (Portugal) Professor Neca (1 July 1983 – 30 June 1984)
- (Portugal) José Carlos (1986–88)
- (Portugal) Mário Reis (22 November 1988 – 30 June 1989)
- (Portugal) Rodolfo Reis (1 July 1989 – 30 June 1991)
- (Portugal) António Oliveira (1 July 1991 – 30 June 1992)
- (Portugal) Vítor Oliveira (1 July 1992 – 30 June 1995)
- (Portugal) Bernardino Pedroto (1 July 1995 – 2 December 1996)
- (Portugal) Fernando Festas (3 December 1996 – 24 March 1997)
- (Brazil) Marconi (25 March 1997 – 30 June 1997)
- (Portugal) Henrique Nunes (1 July 1997 – 8 March 1998)
- (Portugal) Diamantino Miranda (9 March 1998 – 30 June 1998)
- (Portugal) Álvaro Magalhães (1 July 1998 – 20 November 2000)
- (Portugal) Luís Campos (20 November 2000 – 23 December 2001)
- (Portugal) Vítor Oliveira (1 January 2002 – 30 June 2003)
- (Portugal) Mário Reis (1 July 2003 – 11 November 2003)
- (Portugal) Luís Campos (25 November 2003 – 28 October 2004)
- (Portugal) Ulisses Morais (28 October 2004 – 6 March 2006)
- (Portugal) Paulo Alves (8 March 2006 – 21 May 2008)
- (Portugal) Professor Neca (26 May 2008 – 17 November 2008)
- (Portugal) Manuel Ribeiro (18 November 2008 – 16 February 2009)
- (Portugal) João Eusébio (17 February 2009 – 25 May 2009)
- (Portugal) Rui Quinta (6 June 2009 – 27 February 2010)
- (Portugal) Paulo Alves (5 March 2010 –2 1 May 2013)
- (Portugal) João de Deus (1 July 2013 – 31 August 2014)
- (Portugal) José Mota (2 September 2014 – 30 June 2015)
- (Portugal) Nandinho (28 May 2015 – 30 June 2016)
- (Portugal) Álvaro Magalhães (1 July 2016 – 30 June 2017)
- (Portugal) Casquilha (1 July 2017 – 28 December 2017)
- (Portugal) Paulo Alves (28 December 2017 – 23 February 2018)
- (Portugal) Nandinho (1 July 2018 – 30 June 2019)
- (Portugal) Vítor Oliveira (1 July 2019 – 2 August 2020)
- (Portugal) Rui Almeida (3 August 2020 – 11 November 2020)
- (Portugal) Ricardo Soares (13 November 2020 – 30 June 2022)
- (Portugal) Ivo Vieira (1 July 2022 – 2 November 2022)
- (Portugal) Carlos Cunha (interim) (3 November 2022 – 15 November 2022)
- (Portugal) Daniel Sousa (16 November 2022 – 30 June 2023)
- (Portugal) Vítor Campelos (1 July 2023 – 8 April 2024)
- (Portugal) Carlos Cunha (interim) (9 April 2024 – 12 April 2024)
- (Portugal) Tozé Marreco (13 April 2024 – 8 August 2024)
- (Portugal) Carlos Cunha (interim) (9 August 2024 – 11 August 2024)
- (Portugal) Bruno Pinheiro (12 August 2024 – 18 February 2025)
- (Portugal) José Pedro Pinto (interim) (18 February 2025 – 2 March 2025)
- (Portugal) César Peixoto (2 March 2025 – present)
