= Castêlo da Maia =

Town and parish in Grande Porto, Portugal

Coordinates: 41°15′N 8°37′W

Castêlo da Maia is a town (vila) and parish in Maia Municipality, Grande Porto, Portugal. As of the 2021 Census, it has 18,587 inhabitants.
