= Malafaia =

Malafaia is a surname. Notable people with the surname include:

- Ricardo Malafaia (born 1981), Portuguese footballer
- Silas Malafaia (born 1958), Brazilian televangelist
