= Paulo Jorge (footballer, born 1970) =

Portuguese footballer

Personal information
- Full name: Paulo Jorge Carreira Nunes
- Date of birth: 16 June 1970 (age 56)
- Place of birth: Luanda, Angola
- Height: 1.75 m (5 ft 9 in)
- Position: Goalkeeper

Youth career
- 1986–1988: União Leiria

Senior career*
Years	Team	Apps	(Gls)
1988–1992	União Leiria	13	(0)
1992–1993	Fafe	28	(0)
1993–1995	Feirense	68	(0)
1995–1998	Vila Real	91	(0)
1998–2008	Gil Vicente	226	(0)
2012–2013	GRAP	2	(0)
Total		428	(0)
- * Club domestic league appearances and goals

Paulo Jorge Carreira Nunes (born 16 June 1970), known as Paulo Jorge, is a Portuguese former professional footballer who played as a goalkeeper.

== Club career ==
Paulo Jorge was born in Luanda to Portuguese parents. During his career, he represented U.D. Leiria, AD Fafe, C.D. Feirense, S.C. Vila Real and Gil Vicente FC; having signed from the lower leagues into the Segunda Liga in 1998, he contributed seven matches as the latter team promoted as champions.

For the next six Primeira Liga seasons, Paulo Jorge remained an undisputed starter, going on to make nearly 300 overall appearances for the Barcelos-based club and retiring at the age of 38 after a ten-year spell.
