= Pedrouços A.C. =

Portuguese football club

Pedrouços AC
- Full name: Pedrouços Atlético Clube
- Founded: 2 October 1929
- Ground: Complexo Municipal de Pedrouços, Maia
- Capacity: 20,000
- Chairman: (Portugal) José Barbosa Ramalho
- Head Coach: (Portugal) Manuel Pinheiro
- League: Divisão de Honra, A.F. Porto
- 2006–07: Divisão de Honra, A.F. Porto, 5th
Home colours	Away colours

Pedrouços Atlético Clube is a Portuguese football club from Pedrouços, Maia. It was founded on 2 October 1929 by the merger of some local neighbourhood clubs, and currently plays at regional level, disputing the Divisão de Honra, the highest level championship organized by A.F. Porto (Porto's football association), that grants access to the national championships.
