= Mohamed Bamba (disambiguation) =

Mohamed Bamba (born 1998) is an Ivorian-American basketball player.

Mohamed Bamba is may also refer to:

- Mohamed Bamba (footballer, born 2001), Ivorian football forward
- Mohamed Bamba (footballer, born 2004), Ivorian football midfielder

== See also ==
- Mo Bamba (song), 2017 single by Sheck Wes
