= Church of Santa Maria de Abade de Neiva =

- Abbey Church of Santa Maria
- Igreja de Santa Maria de Abade de Neiva
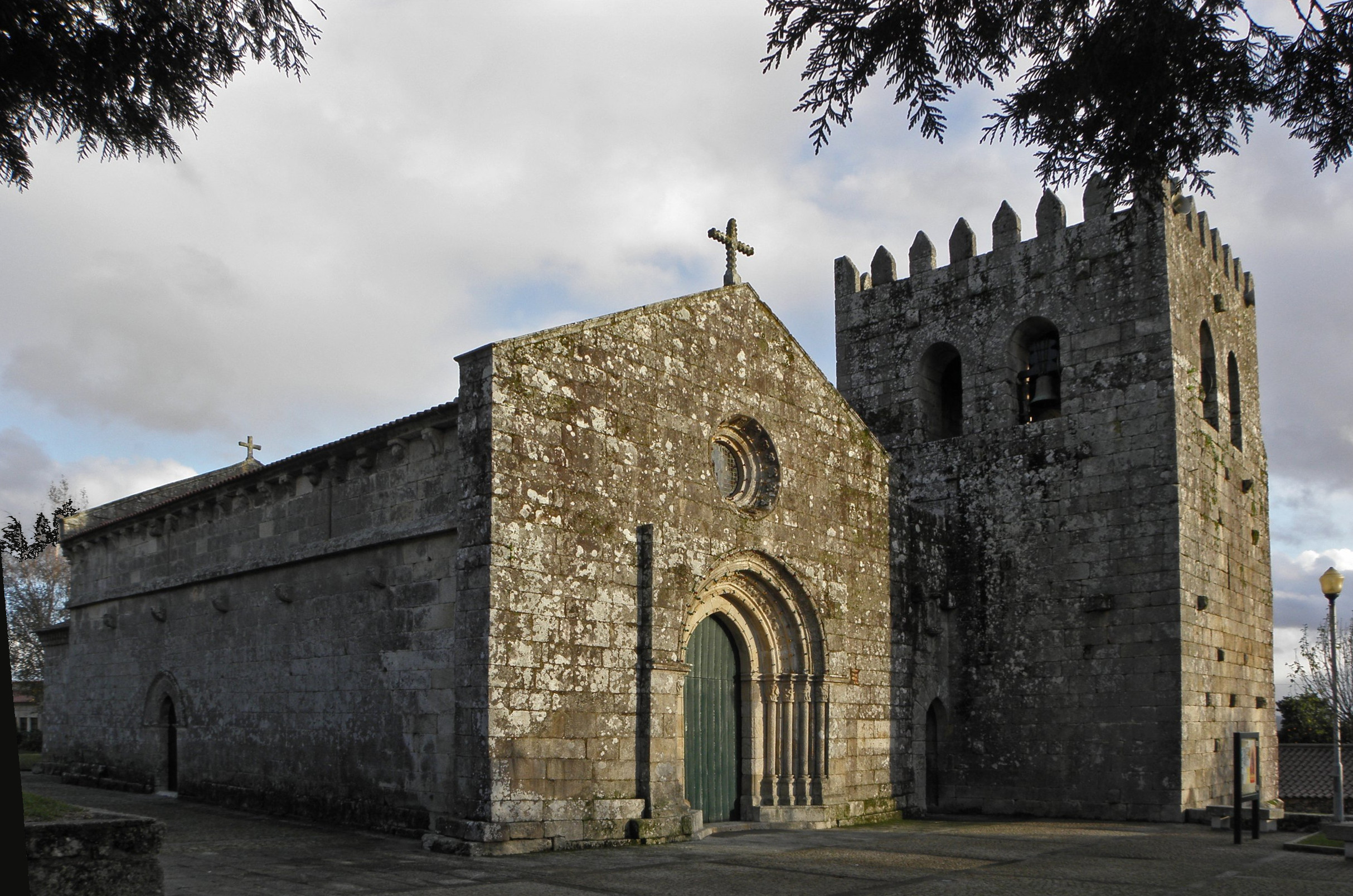
- An oblique view of the massive church/monastery of Santa Maria in Barcelos
- Church of Santa Maria de Abade de Neiva
- 41°33′18.5″N 8°38′21.3″W
- Location: Braga, Grande Porto, Norte
- Country: Portugal
- Denomination: Roman Catholic

History
- Dedication: Abade de Neiva

Architecture
- Style: Romanesque

The Church of Santa Maria de Abade de Neiva (Portuguese: Igreja Paroquial de Abade de Neiva/Igreja de Santa Maria/Igreja de Santa Maria do Abade de Neiva) is the parochial church of the civil parish of Abade de Neiva, in the municipality of Barcelos, Portuguese district of Braga.

== History ==
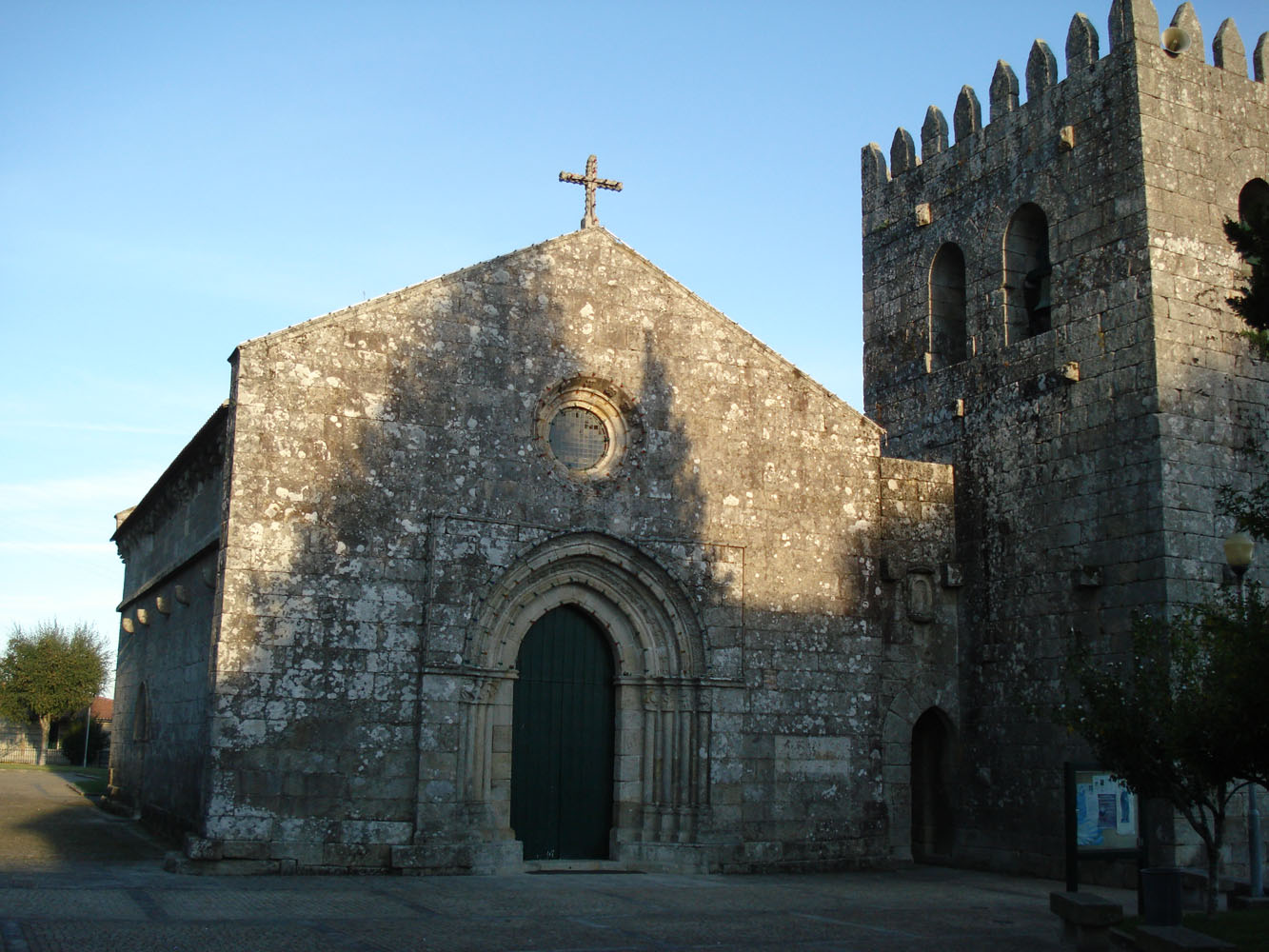
The church was initiated by D. Afonso Henrique's mother in the 12th century

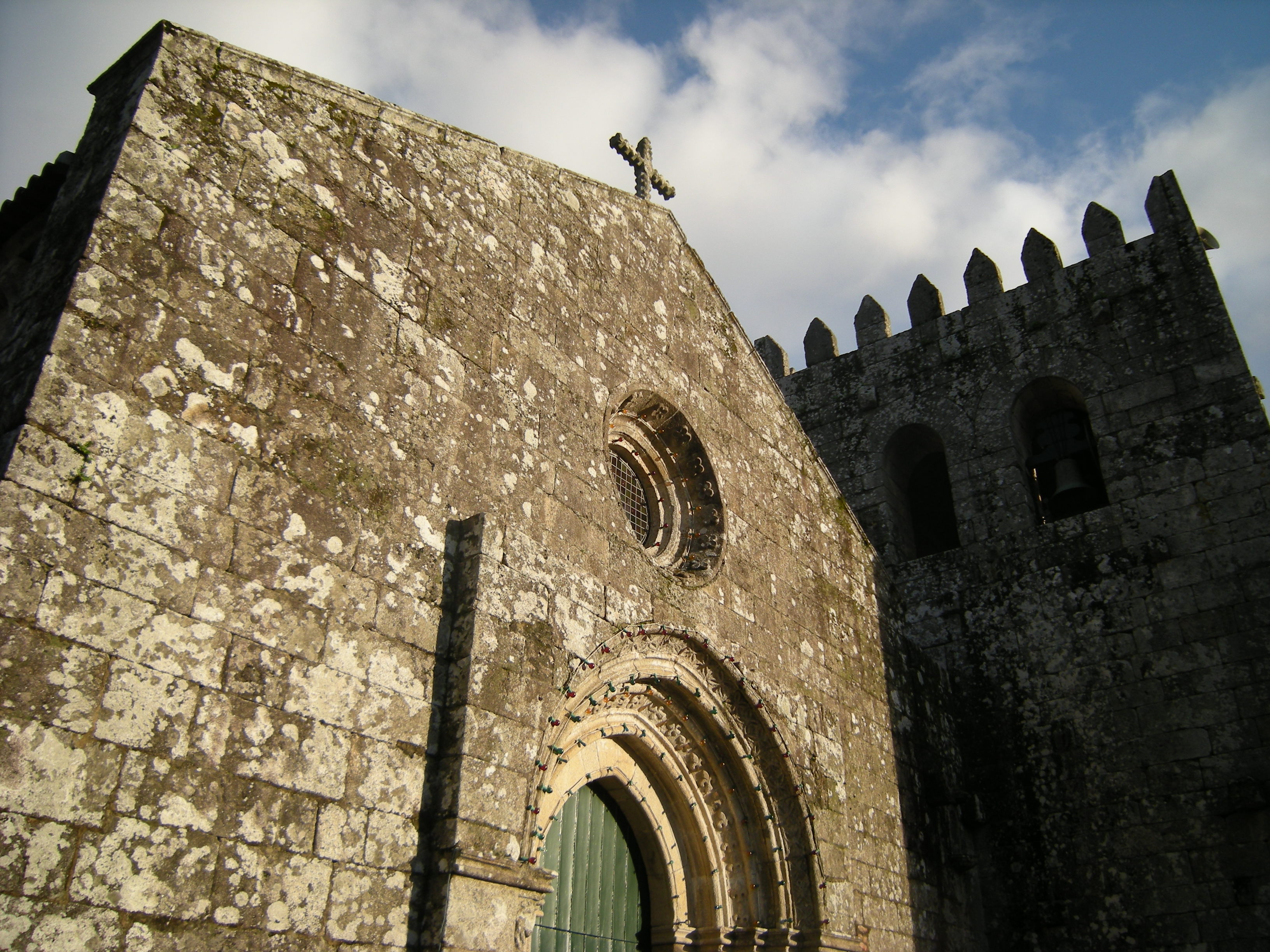
The front facade and belltower, showing the four archivolts over the portico

In 1152, Queen D. Mafalda, wife of D. Afonso Henriques, founded in the location of Neiva a monastery, a public construction that was incomplete at the time of her death. By 1220, the church was considered a royal church and continued to be operated as one of the monarchy's churches even by 1258.

King D. Dinis donated the territory of Neiva to master Martinho in 1301, the King's physician and deacon of the Sé Cathedral of Braga. Around 1310, by request of Martinho, the archbishop of D. Martinho de Oliveira, instituted a collegiate at the church, that consisted of a rector and three chaplains. By the beginning of the 14th century, the church factory begun to operate, as part of the founding of the collegiate, as suggested by Almeida (1978). But, shortly after (1410), the site was donated to D. Afonso, future Duke of Braganza, where it remained part of his possessions until 1833.

The tower was completed in the 15th century.

From the writings of Father Carvalho da Costa (dated 1706), who was vicar and archdeacon of Neiva, he received a stipend of 60$000 reís. At the same time, the monastery paid tithes to the Diocese of Braga.

In 1732, orders were given to repair the porch that existed over the principal facade. Two years later, work was undertaken to open-up two belfries in the tower and erect a choir. This was followed closely behind by painting of the ceilings and plastering of the walls in the main chapel and nave (in 1744). Similar public work on the walls of the churchyard was also undertaken in 1758. But, by 1831, the church was already in ruins.

Beginning in 1904, the first work to rebuild or reconstruct the church began with the front wall, which was in a state of ruin, while in the interior the wood floors were replaced.

== Architecture ==
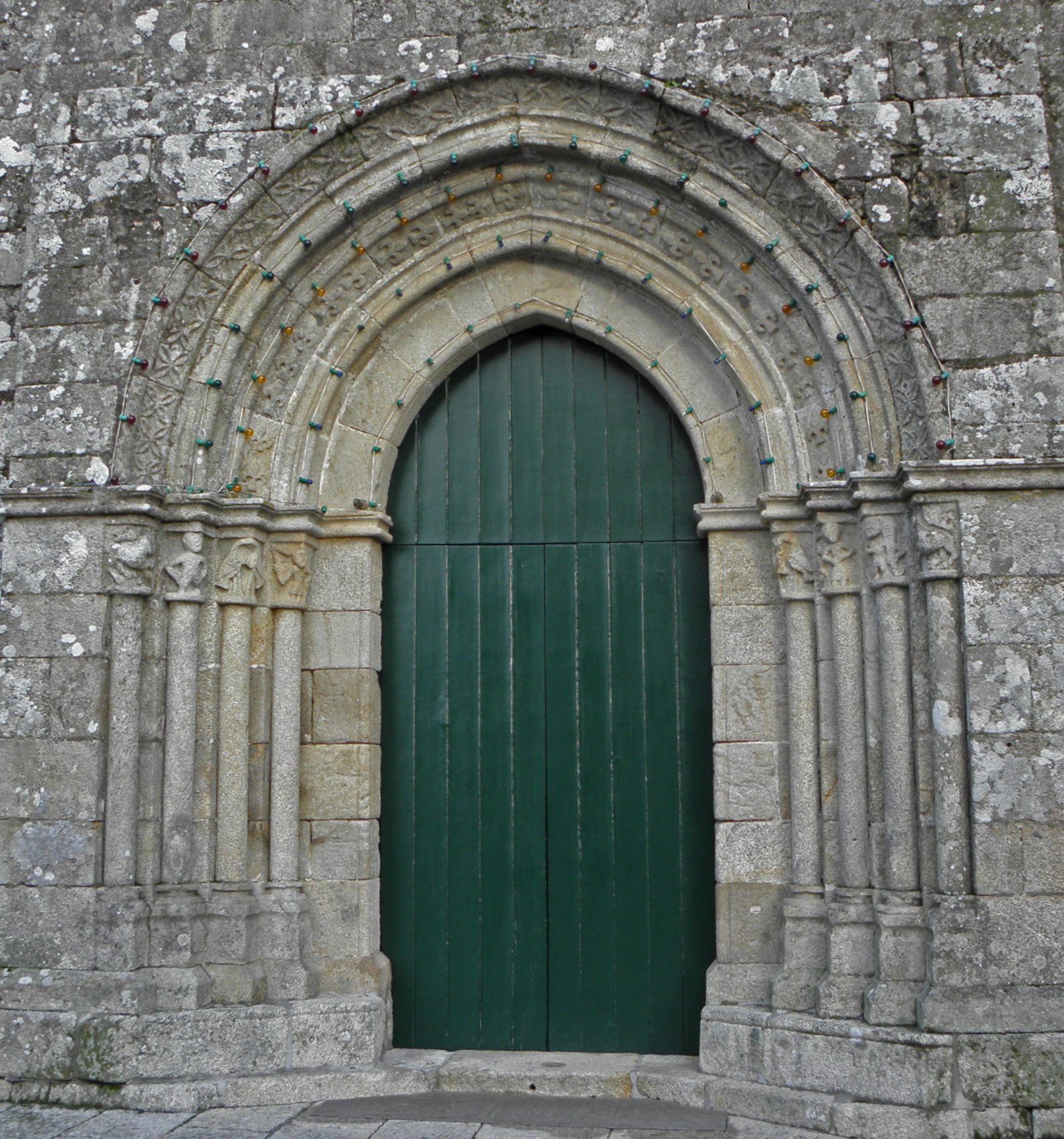
The Gothic portico with four archivolts

The church is located in a rural community, situated in an elevated area on the flank of a hilltop overlooking the national roadway (Barcelos to Viana do Castelo). It is encircled by churchyard, parochial cemetery, public gardens and small, short residential buildings.

The plan consists of a longitudinal nave and rectangular presbytery, with the areas covered in varying tiled ceiling. The principal facade includes a portico without tympanum, but tall Romanesque entranceway consisting of four archivolts, supported by 8 columns with plain shaft and capitals with anthropomorphic and zoomorphic elements. Over the main door is a round oculus.

The lateral doorways also have vaulted entranceways, but more in keeping with the Gothic style. At about halfway up the walls are small, simple slits, while along the lateral nave walls are Romanesque cantilevers, with sculptures of faces, fish, animal heads (including bulls and pigs), a series of balls and a post-Dionisic shield (on the north).

In the interior is a triumphal arch with supported by two simple columns. The head of the main chapel is illuminated by Gothic window with four-lobed oculus. The walls are covered in lettering, that is almost alphabetic. Along the southern part of the church is a low, imposing tower crowned by pyramidal merlons.
