= Pedras Rubras =

Coordinates: 41°14′N 8°40′W

A street of traditional houses in Pedras Rubras, near Porto Airport

Pedras Rubras (Portuguese for Reddish stones) is a Portuguese locality and suburb in the Moreira parish, in the Maia Municipality of the Greater Porto subregion. The Porto Airport (OPO) (Sá Carneiro International Airport, formerly known as Pedras Rubras Airport) terminal and part of runway is located in Pedras Rubras.
