= Ferbar =

Portuguese wholesaler of food products

Ferbar – Fernando Barros, Produtos Alimentares, Lda or simply Ferbar, is a Portuguese company specialized on wholesale of food products, including canned vegetables, sauces, tomato products and canned fruits. The company, headquartered in Maia, Greater Porto subregion, is the leading brand on its segment in Portugal. The company exports its wide range of products to several countries, including Angola and Mozambique.

== History ==
Ferbar was founded in 1971 by Fernando Nogueira de Barros Coelho, having started its operations as a small regional company, operating in Northern Portugal as a distributor of wholesale food products. Installed in a warehouse with 150 m2, then with the help of two employees.

In 1980, with the objective to expand the business into the entire country, the company moved their facilities to the Industrial Area of Maia, now occupying a total area of 28,000 m2.

During the 1990s the company turnover had a growth of 300%. Its marketing effort included sponsorship of several sports teams and events, involving also the Portuguese Football Championship's Sport Comércio e Salgueiros football team. Just before 2005, Ferbar's exports represented 5% of the total revenue. In 2007, and according to the INE, the company exported to Angola, Belgium, Brazil, Canada, Cape Verde, France, Germany, Italy, Luxembourg, Macau, Mozambique, Netherlands, S.Tomé and Principe, Spain, Switzerland, and the United Kingdom.
