= Corporação Industrial do Norte =

Paint and coating company in Portugal

CIN - Corporação Industrial do Norte, S.A.
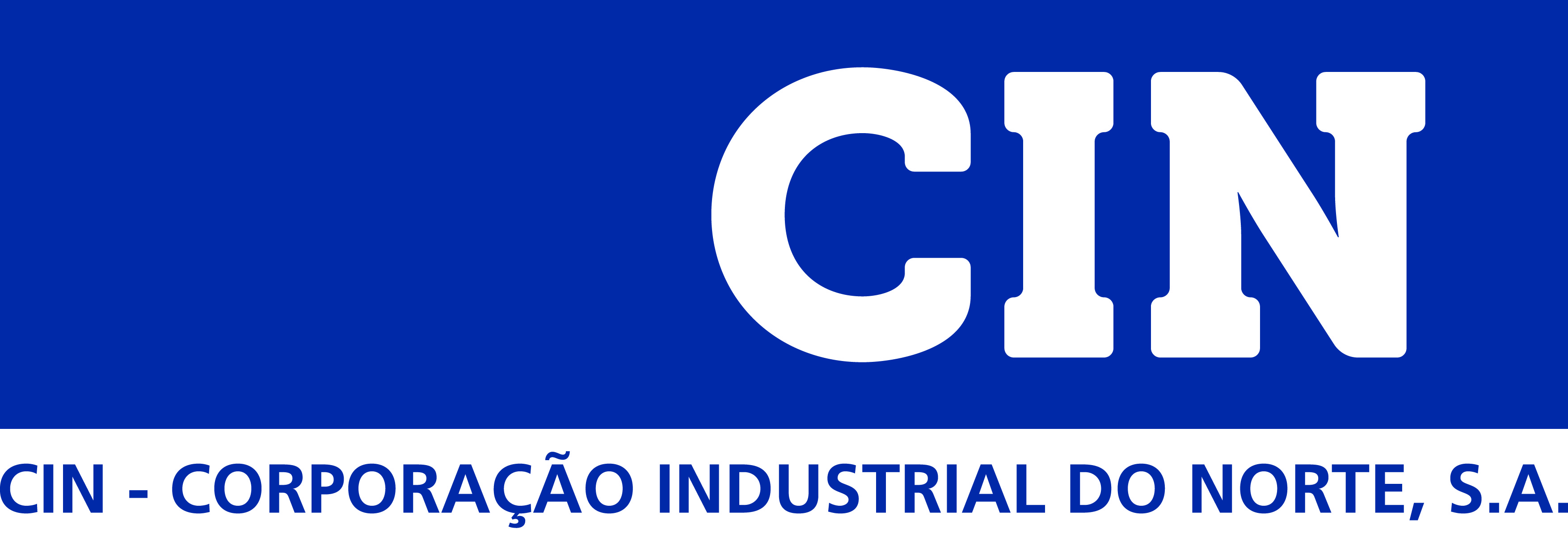
- Company type: Unlisted public company
- Industry: Paint & coating products
- Founded: 1917; 108 years ago in Maia, Portugal
- Headquarters: Maia, Portugal
- Key people: João Serrenho, CEO
- Website: cin.com/en

CIN - Corporação Industrial do Norte S.A. is a Portuguese company that is the Iberian market leader for paint & coating products. The company was established in 1926 and is headquartered in Maia, Norte Region.

In 1990 CIN became a member of the Coatings Research Group Inc. (CRGI) in Cleveland, Ohio, USA, a group that tests innovative prime materials, products and technology in the paint industry for the construction segment.

== Companies ==
The main companies in the CIN Group are:

- Nitin
- Lacose-Sotinco
- Tintas Cin Açores
- Tintas Cin Madeira
- Barnices Valentine
- Tintas Cin de Angola
- Pinturas Cin Canarias
- Boero Bartolomeo Spa
- Tintas Cin de Moçambique
