= Manoel (footballer, born 1978) =

Brazilian footballer

Personal information
- Full name: Manoel Lourenço da Silva Filho
- Date of birth: 2 February 1978 (age 48)
- Place of birth: Feira de Santana, Brazil
- Height: 1.86 m (6 ft 1 in)
- Position: Centre forward

Senior career*
Years	Team	Apps	(Gls)
1997–1998	Internacional	3	(0)
1999	PSV	0	(0)
1999–2000	Vitória	14	(4)
2000–2001	Vitória Guimarães	13	(2)
2001–2003	Gil Vicente	60	(15)
2003–2005	Moreirense	62	(13)
2005–2006	Sporting CP	0	(0)
2005–2006	→ Vitória Guimarães (loan)	19	(0)
2006	Belenenses	9	(0)
2007	CRB	3	(0)
2008	Nanchang Bayi	2	(0)
2009	Vihren	5	(0)
2010	Bahrain Riffa Club		
2011	América-SP	10	(3)
2011	Francana	7	(3)
2011	Palmeirinha		
2012	MS Saad		
2012	Legião		
- * Club domestic league appearances and goals

Manoel Lourenço da Silva Filho (born 2 February 1978), known simply as Manoel, is a Brazilian retired footballer who played as a centre forward.

== Football career ==
Born in Feira de Santana, Bahia, Manoel started his professional career with Sport Club Internacional. In January 1999 he moved abroad and signed for PSV Eindhoven in the Netherlands, but returned shortly after to his country.

Manoel would spend the following seven years in Portugal, playing for Vitória de Guimarães, Gil Vicente FC (scoring ten Primeira Liga goals in the 2002–03 season as the Barcelos club finished eighth) and Moreirense FC. In the 2005 summer he joined Sporting Clube de Portugal, but was immediately loaned to Vitória Guimarães and never appeared officially for the Lions; during his spell with the Minho side he failed to find the net in the league, in an eventual relegation-ending campaign.

After starting 2006–07 with C.F. Os Belenenses, also in the top flight, Manoel left Portugal and returned to his country, with lowly Clube de Regatas Brasil. In the following years he moved teams – and continents – constantly, playing for teams in Bulgaria, China and Bahrain.
