= Ricardo Malafaia =

Portuguese footballer

Personal information
- Full name: Ricardo Sousa Malafaia Fernandes
- Date of birth: 11 August 1981 (age 45)
- Place of birth: Maia, Portugal
- Height: 1.75 m (5 ft 9 in)
- Position: Midfielder

Team information
- Current team: Estrela Amadora (assistant)

Youth career
- 1990–1992: Maia
- 1992–1996: Porto
- 1996: Rio Ave
- 1997–2000: Maia

Senior career*
Years	Team	Apps	(Gls)
2000–2001	Maia	0	(0)
2001–2002	Pedrouços		
2002–2005	Maia	81	(3)
2005–2007	Leixões	42	(2)
2007–2009	Varzim	55	(0)
2009–2010	Racing Ferrol	27	(2)
2010–2011	Gondomar	21	(3)
2011–2012	Boavista	15	(1)
2012–2013	Leixões	28	(2)
2013–2014	Maia Lidador	7	(1)
2014–2015	Santa Clara	42	(2)
2015–2016	Leixões	26	(0)
Total		344	(16)

Managerial career
- 2016–2018: Leixões (youth)
- 2018: Leixões
- 2018–2019: Padroense
- 2019–2024: Porto (youth)
- 2024–: Estrela Amadora (assistant)
- * Club domestic league appearances and goals

Ricardo Sousa Malafaia Fernandes (born 11 August 1981 in Maia, Porto District), known as Malafaia, is a Portuguese former professional footballer who played as a midfielder, currently a manager.
