= César Gomes =

Portuguese footballer (born 1996)

Personal information
- Full name: César Joaquim Ferreira Gomes
- Date of birth: 17 April 1996 (age 30)
- Place of birth: Porto, Portugal
- Height: 1.85 m (6 ft 1 in)
- Position: Midfielder

Team information
- Current team: Vitória de Sernache

Youth career
- 2004–2015: Penafiel
- 2013: → Freamunde (loan)

Senior career*
Years	Team	Apps	(Gls)
2015–2019	Penafiel	22	(1)
2018–2019	→ Cinfães (loan)	28	(1)
2019–2020	Pedras Rubras	24	(3)
2020	São Martinho	5	(0)
2021	Pedras Rubras	11	(3)
2021–	Vitória de Sernache	4	(0)
- * Club domestic league appearances and goals as of 7 November 2021

César Joaquim Ferreira Gomes (born 17 April 1996) is a Portuguese footballer who plays for Vitória de Sernache as a midfielder.

== Career ==
On 3 January 2016, Gomes made his professional debut with Penafiel in a 2015–16 Segunda Liga match against Famalicão.
