= 1998–99 Segunda Divisão de Honra =

65th season of second-tier football league in Portugal

Segunda Divisão de Honra
- Season: 1998–99
- Champions: Gil Vicente FC
- Promoted: Gil Vicente FC; Os Belenenses; CD Santa Clara
- Relegated: CD Feirense; União Funchal; GD Estoril Praia

The 1998–99 Segunda Divisão de Honra season was the ninth season of the competition and the 65th season of recognised second-tier football in Portugal.

== Overview ==
The league was contested by 18 teams with Gil Vicente FC winning the championship and gaining promotion to the Primeira Liga along with Os Belenenses and CD Santa Clara. At the other end of the table CD Feirense, União Funchal and GD Estoril Praia were relegated to the Segunda Divisão.

== League standings ==
Pos	Team	Pld	W	D	L	GF	GA	GD	Pts	Promotion or relegation
1	Gil Vicente (C, P)	34	20	8	6	58	24	+34	68	Promotion to Primeira Liga
2	Belenenses (P)	34	17	10	7	55	28	+27	61	Promotion to Primeira Liga
3	Santa Clara (P)	34	14	13	7	53	37	+16	55	Promotion to Primeira Liga
4	Desportivo das Aves	34	14	9	11	46	43	+3	51	
5	Felgueiras	34	12	14	8	60	40	+20	50	
6	Leça	34	14	8	12	51	49	+2	50	
7	Espinho	34	13	11	10	45	37	+8	50	
8	Varzim	34	13	9	12	51	46	+5	48	
9	Penafiel	34	11	14	9	56	49	+7	47	
10	Maia	34	12	10	12	53	50	+3	46	
11	Paços de Ferreira	34	10	14	10	38	35	+3	44	
12	Moreirense	34	11	8	15	40	56	−16	41	
13	Naval 1º Maio	34	9	11	14	34	54	−20	38	
14	Esposende	34	8	14	12	24	34	−10	38	
15	União de Lamas	34	9	10	15	28	48	−20	37	
16	Feirense (R)	34	9	10	15	34	53	−19	37	Relegation to Segunda Divisão B
17	União da Madeira (R)	34	8	9	17	34	50	−16	33	Relegation to Segunda Divisão B
18	Estoril (R)	34	6	10	18	23	50	−27	28	Relegation to Segunda Divisão B

(C) Champions; (P) Promoted; (R) Relegated
