= Cerealis =

Portuguese food producer

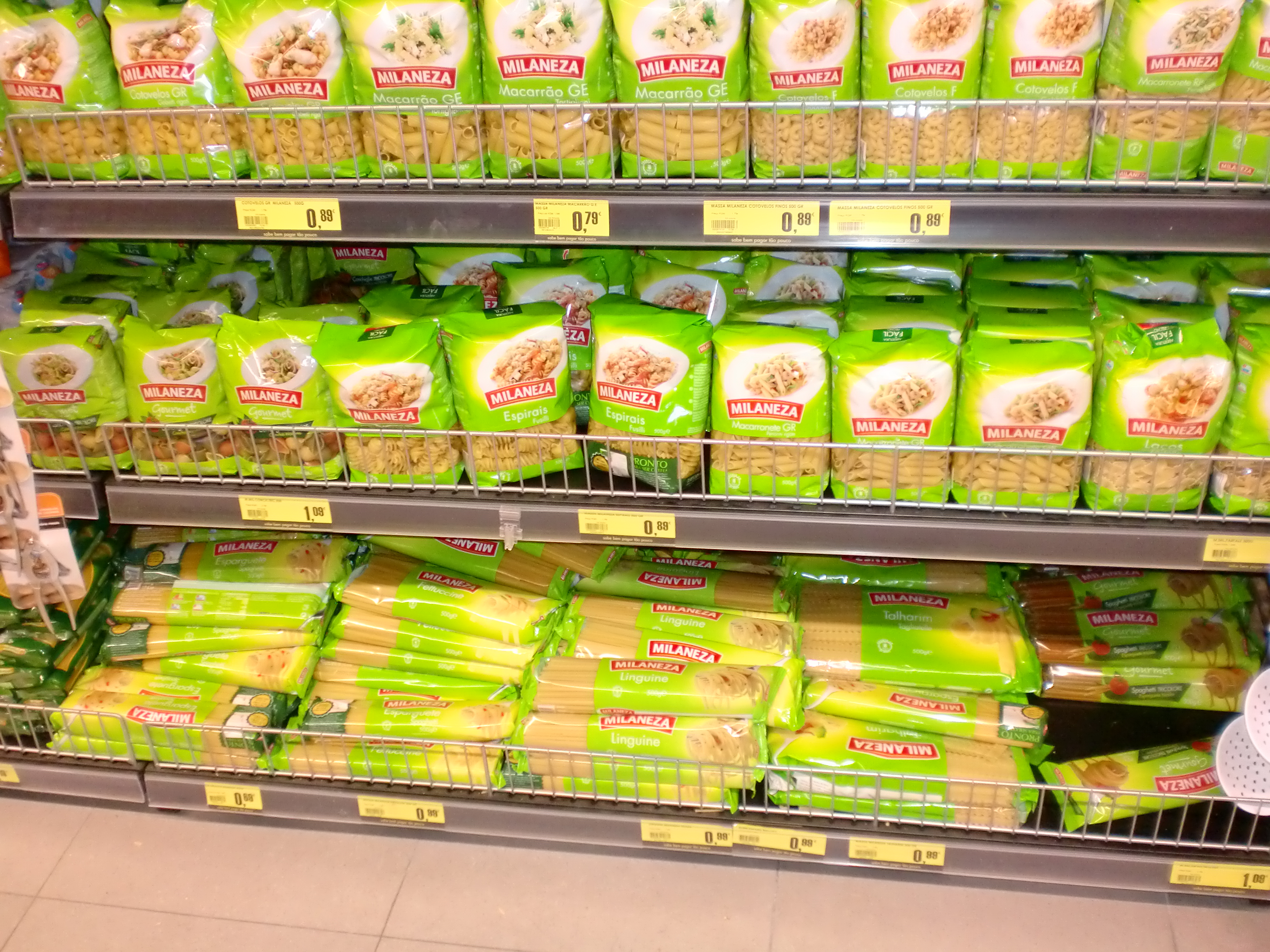
Milaneza brand products at a supermarket

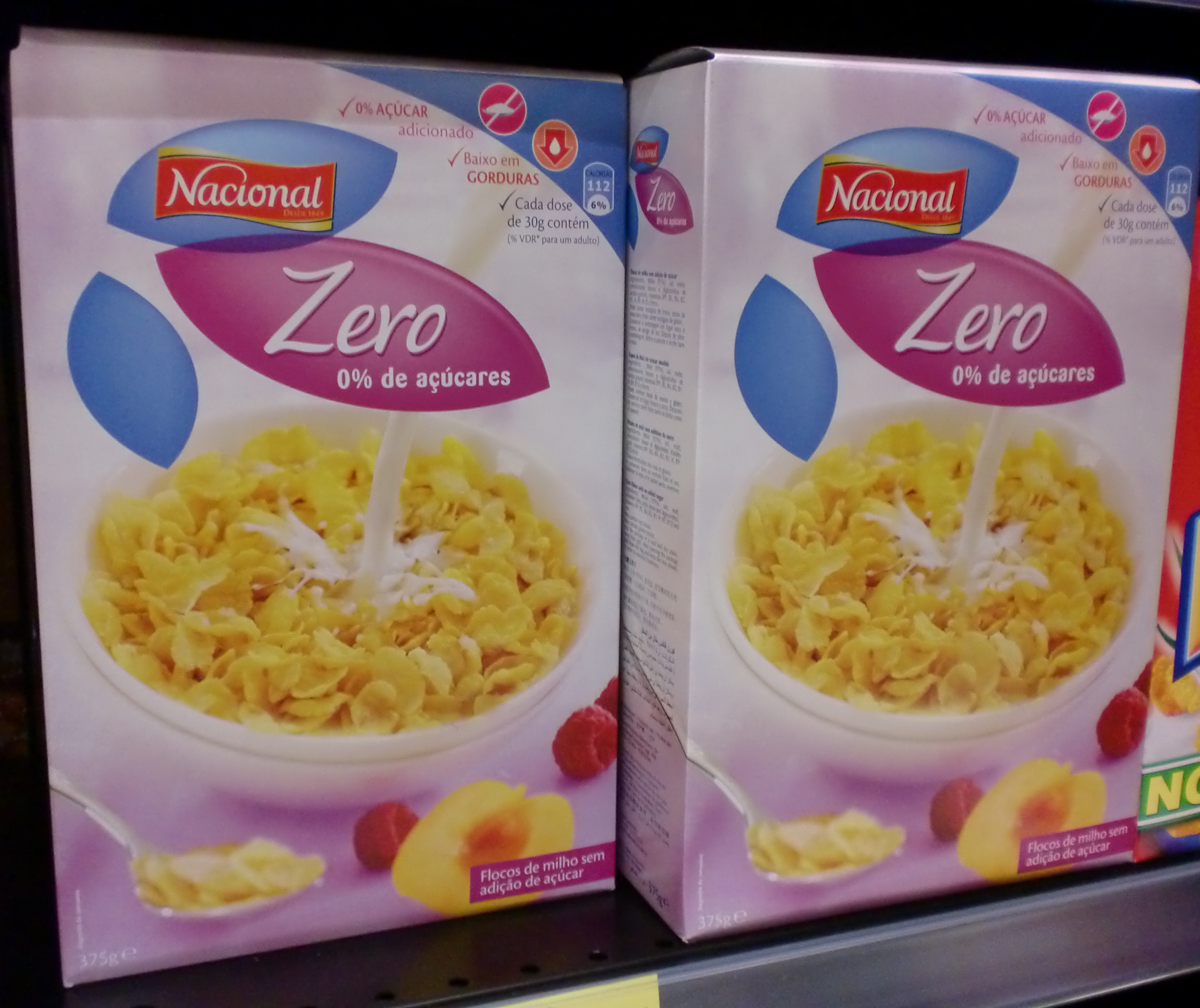
Nacional cereals

Cerealis is a Portuguese food producer and the biggest milling company in Portugal, headquartered in Maia, and founded in 1919 as a cereal processing company. Cerealis Group has two divisions, food producer Cerealis Produtos Alimentares and miller Cerealis Moagens which produce and commercialise a range of products including pasta, biscuits, cornflakes as well as providing milled wheat flour and rye flour to the food manufacturing sector. Cerealis Group is a privately owned company and owns the Portuguese well-known brands Milaneza and Nacional. The company's exporting branch, Cerealis Internacional, exports the groups's products, and has its main clients in the United Kingdom, France, Belgium, Luxembourg, Germany, Switzerland, United States, Canada, Angola, Mozambique, Cape Verde, São Tomé and Príncipe, Cuba, South Africa, and Libya. In 2007, about 200,000,000 euros of products were exported by Cerealis.

== History ==
Founded in 1919 by José Alves de Amorim and Manuel Gonçalves Lage, the company first started out in the milling business, supplying flour for bakeries. Spurred on by their initial success, the founders started diversifying. In 1933, they inaugurated a modern manufacturing plant to produce pastas, launching them on the market with the Milaneza brand name. Milaneza become the leading Pasta-maker on the Portuguese market, being the first one of its kind to be certified. The Grupo Amorim Lage ("Amorim Lage Group") become one of the largest Iberian companies in the sector and the oldest in continuous operation in Portugal.

Operating in a large number of markets, including the European Union, Portuguese-speaking African countries, the United States, and Canada, exports account for over 25% of the company's business turnover; the company continued to expand in the 2000s. In 2005, the Grupo Amorim Lage, affiliated with the Associação Empresarial de Portugal since 1930, with its subsidiaries Milaneza, Nacional, and Harmonia, was renamed and organized into a new company, Cerealis, SGPS, S.A., Cerealis Produtos Alimentares, S.A. In 2006, three companies (Spain's Ebro Puleva and Grupo Gallo and Italy's Barilla S.p.A.) all rumoured to be interested in sealing a deal to acquire Portugal's leading pasta maker Cerealis. The proposed sale, according to Dow Jones, was worth over €100 million ($121.12 million) but Cerealis management team refused the offers.
