= Mohamed Bamba (footballer, born 2004) =

Ivorian footballer (born 2004)

Personal information
- Full name: Mohamed Aboubakar Ben Mondesir Bamba
- Date of birth: 8 October 2004 (age 22)
- Place of birth: Vavoua, Ivory Coast
- Height: 1.88 m (6 ft 2 in)
- Position: Midfielder

Team information
- Current team: Gil Vicente
- Number: 8

Youth career
- –2023: ES Bafing

Senior career*
Years	Team	Apps	(Gls)
2023–2025	Reims B	24	(5)
2024–2025	Reims	2	(0)
2025–	Gil Vicente	15	(1)
- * Club domestic league appearances and goals as of 17 February 2026

Mohamed Aboubakar Ben Mondesir Bamba (born 8 October 2004) is an Ivorian professional footballer who plays as a midfielder for Primeira Liga club Gil Vicente.

== Club career ==
Bamba joined French club Reims from Ivorian club ES Bafing in July 2023. He played for the club's reserve side in the Championnat National 3 for a year and a half before making his Ligue 1 debut in a 1–0 defeat away to Toulouse on 3 November 2024.

On 4 February 2025, Bamba signed for Primeira Liga club Gil Vicente on a two-year contract. His first goal for the club was a stoppage time winner in a 1–0 victory over Farense on 26 April 2025, a game in which he was also recognized as the player of the match.

== Honours ==
Reims

- Coupe de France runner-up: 2024–25
