= Pedrouços =

- Civil parish
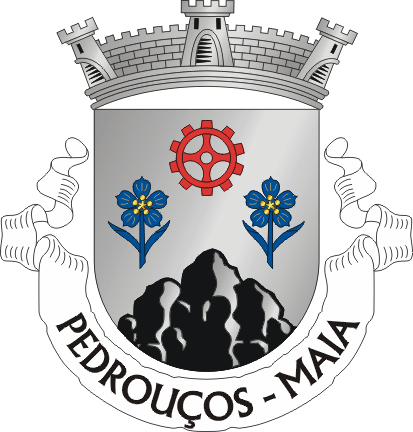
- Coat of arms

- Coordinates: 41.186°N 8.589°W
- Country: Portugal
- Region: Norte
- Metropolitan area: Porto
- District: Porto
- Municipality: Maia

Area
  - Total: 2.57 km^{2} (0.99 sq mi)

Population (2011)
  - Total: 12,149
  - Density: 4,700/km^{2} (12,000/sq mi)
- Time zone: UTC+00:00 (WET)
  - Summer (DST): UTC+01:00 (WEST)
- Postal code: 4425
- Website: http://www.jf-pedroucos.pt/

Pedrouços is a Portuguese parish located in the municipality of Maia. The population in 2011 was 12,149, in an area of 2.57 km².

The place of Pedrouços was the most important and populous of the Águas Santas parish. As an autonomous religious parish it has been in existence since 1928, but the civil parish status (Freguesia) was only given to it in 1985.
