= Pedro Albergaria =

Portuguese footballer (born 1980)

Personal information
- Full name: Pedro Nuno Alves Soares Albergaria
- Date of birth: 12 December 1980 (age 45)
- Place of birth: Maia, Portugal
- Height: 1.84 m (6 ft 0 in)
- Position: Goalkeeper

Youth career
- 1990–1999: Boavista

Senior career*
Years	Team	Apps	(Gls)
1999–2000	Boavista	0	(0)
1999–2000	→ Feirense (loan)	24	(0)
2000–2001	Gondomar	22	(0)
2001–2003	Estoril	40	(0)
2003–2004	Maia	2	(0)
2004–2005	União Lamas	17	(0)
2005–2006	Famalicão	15	(0)
2006–2007	Marco	22	(0)
2007–2012	Tirsense	114	(0)
2012–2013	Ribeirão	41	(0)
2014	São João Ver	10	(0)
2014–2019	Vizela	116	(0)
Total		423	(0)

International career
1996	Portugal U16	1	(0)
1997	Portugal U17	1	(0)
1998–1999	Portugal U18	7	(0)
- * Club domestic league appearances and goals

Pedro Nuno Alves Soares Albergaria (born 12 December 1980) is a Portuguese retired professional footballer who played as a goalkeeper.

== Club career ==
Born in Maia, Porto District, Albergaria appeared twice for F.C. Maia in the Segunda Liga in 2003–04 after competing solely in the lower leagues, to where he returned at the end of that season. His most steady spell was lived at F.C. Tirsense, with whom he signed in the summer of 2007 and where he remained five years.

At the end of the 2015–16 campaign, Albergaria helped F.C. Vizela return to the second division after an absence of seven years. His first game in the competition with the club – third overall, at the age of 35 – occurred on 6 August 2016, in a 1–0 away win against Académico de Viseu FC.

== International career ==
Albergaria was part of the Portugal U18 squad at the 1999 UEFA European Under-18 Championship, keeping a clean sheet in the final against Italy as the tournament ended in conquest.
