= Moreira (Maia) =

- Civil parish
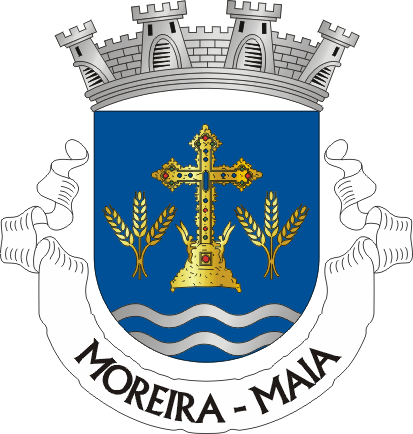
- Coat of arms

- Location in Portugal
- Coordinates: 41.249°N 8.650°W
- Country: Portugal
- Region: Norte
- Metropolitan area: Porto
- District: Porto
- Municipality: Maia

Area
  - Total: 8.67 km^{2} (3.35 sq mi)

Population (2011)
  - Total: 12,890
  - Density: 1,500/km^{2} (3,900/sq mi)
- Time zone: UTC+00:00 (WET)
  - Summer (DST): UTC+01:00 (WEST)

Moreira, also known as Moreira da Maia, is a Portuguese town (vila) and civil parish in the municipality of Maia, Greater Porto, Portugal. It was formed in 2013 by the merger of the former parishes Duas Igrejas, Rio Mau, Goães, Godinhaços, Pedregais, Azões and Portela das Cabras. The population in 2011 was 12,890, in an area of 8.67 km².
