= Águas Santas =

- Civil parish
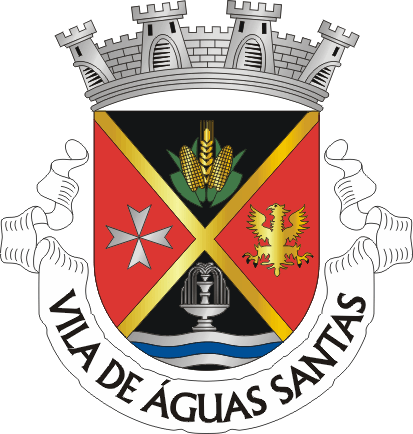
- Coat of arms

- Coordinates: 41.209°N 8.589°W
- Country: Portugal
- Region: Norte
- Metropolitan area: Porto
- District: Porto
- Municipality: Maia

Area
  - Total: 8.23 km^{2} (3.18 sq mi)

Population (2011)
  - Total: 27,470
  - Density: 3,300/km^{2} (8,600/sq mi)
- Time zone: UTC+00:00 (WET)
  - Summer (DST): UTC+01:00 (WEST)
- Website: www.jf-aguassantas.pt

Águas Santas is a Portuguese town and parish located in the municipality of Maia. The population in 2011 was 27,470, in an area of 8.23 km^{2}, making it one of the most densely populated towns in the Porto District. It is located about 3.5 kilometers north of the city of Porto, near river Leça.

== History ==
The first references to Águas Santas are found in a document dating from the year 1120, where Pope Callixtus II mentions the monastery of Aquis Sanctis.

The origin of the parish of Águas Santas predates the formation of the nationality, and there are even traces of its existence as far back as the 6th century. However, the oldest known document dates back to 1405, and the records of 1120 include a reference to Sancta Marya Aquis Sanctis in a charter donated by the city of Porto to Bishop Hugo.

Legend has it that the mother superior of a convent, hearing of the approach of the Romans, hid the image of the Virgin Mary near a fountain; when she unveiled it, she saw the image of Our Lady weeping. When the people heard the news, they called it the Fountain of Holy Water. Later, the church of the Convent of Águas Santas was built near the fountain. This would be the history of the name of the parish.

It was an important award from the Order of the Hospital of St. John of Jerusalem, Rhodes and Malta, or simply the Order of Malta, as it is better known today. For this reason, the cross of the Order of Malta[3] is included in the municipal coat of arms.

The seat of the parish, the village of Águas Santas, was promoted to town in 1986.

== See also ==
- Associação Atlética de Águas Santas - the local professional handball team
- Cerealis - a Portuguese food producer headquartered in Águas Santas
