= Cidade da Maia =

- Civil parish
- Location in Portugal
- Coordinates: 41.233°N 8.622°W
- Country: Portugal
- Region: Norte
- Metropolitan area: Porto
- District: Porto
- Municipality: Maia

Area
  - Total: 10.42 km^{2} (4.02 sq mi)

Population (2011)
  - Total: 40,134
  - Density: 3,900/km^{2} (10,000/sq mi)
- Time zone: UTC+00:00 (WET)
  - Summer (DST): UTC+01:00 (WEST)

Cidade da Maia is a civil parish in the municipality of Maia, Portugal. It was formed in 2013 by the merger of the former parishes Gueifães, Maia and Vermoim. The population in 2011 was 40,134, in an area of 10.42 km^{2}. The parish covers the central area of Maia. In 1902, Maia achieved the status of vila (town). Maia was granted city status (cidade) on 23 August 1986.

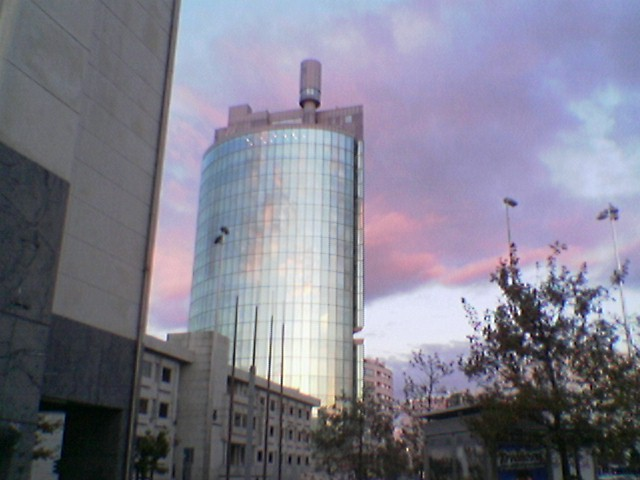
Maia City Hall's Lidador Tower

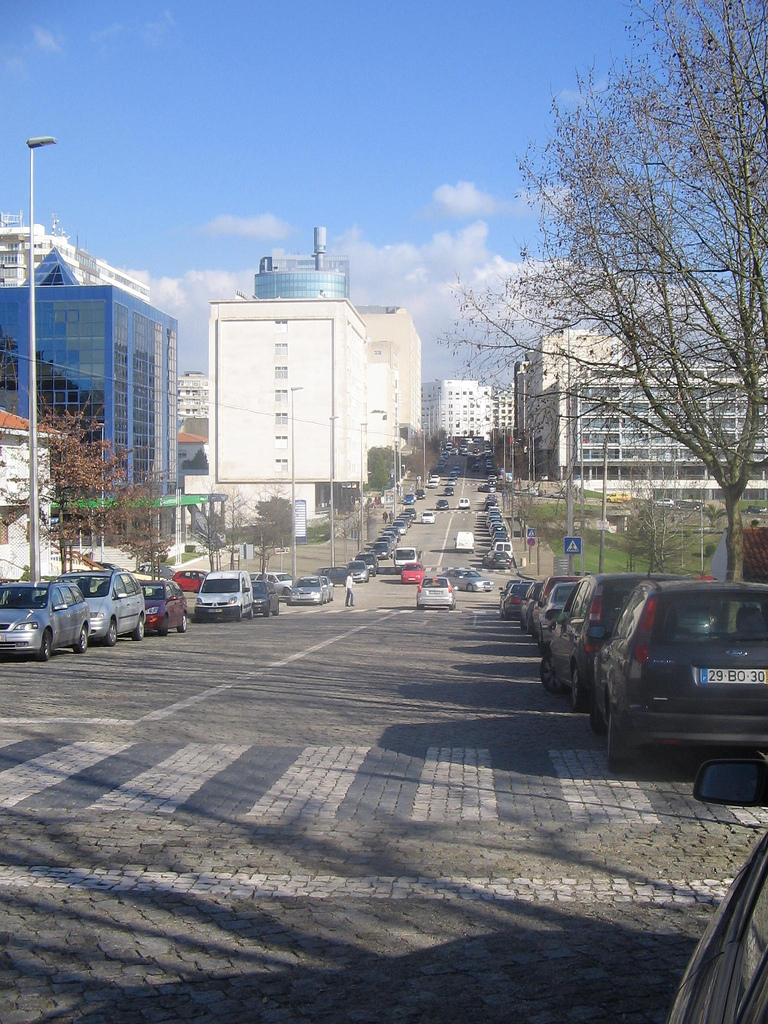
Visconde de Barreiros' Avenue, Maia.

== Sports ==
Maia is the hometown of two important sports organizations: the football club FC Maia, and the cycling team União Ciclista da Maia.
