= Maia, Portugal =

Maia
- Municipality
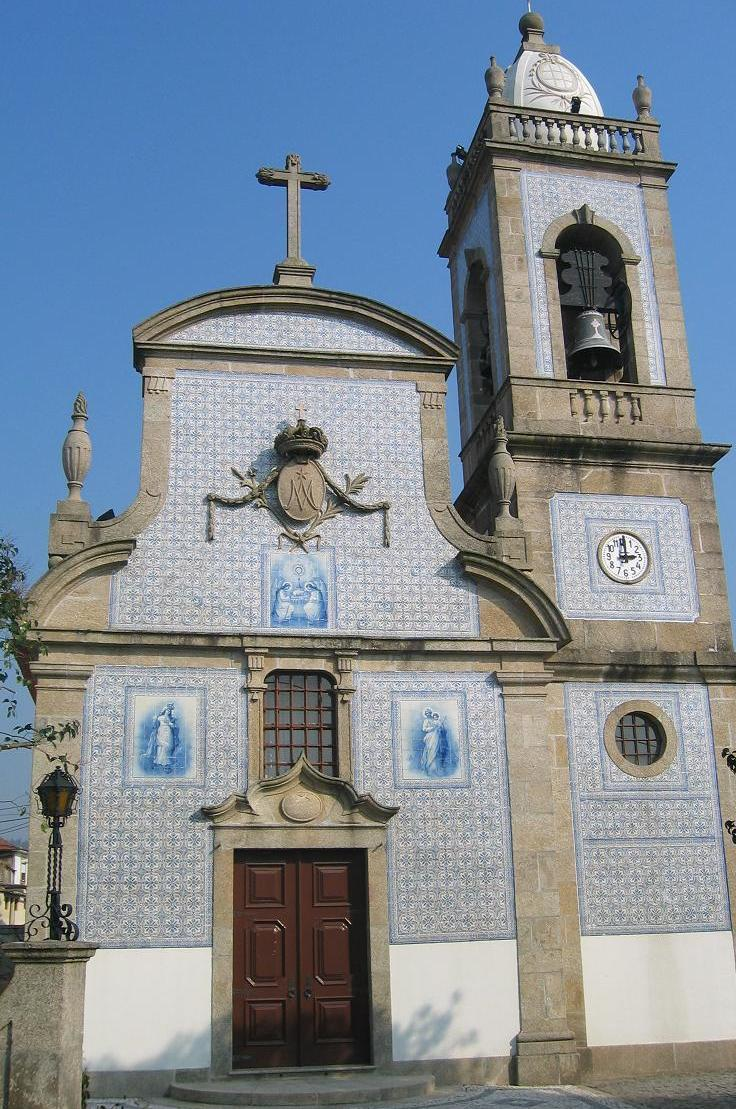
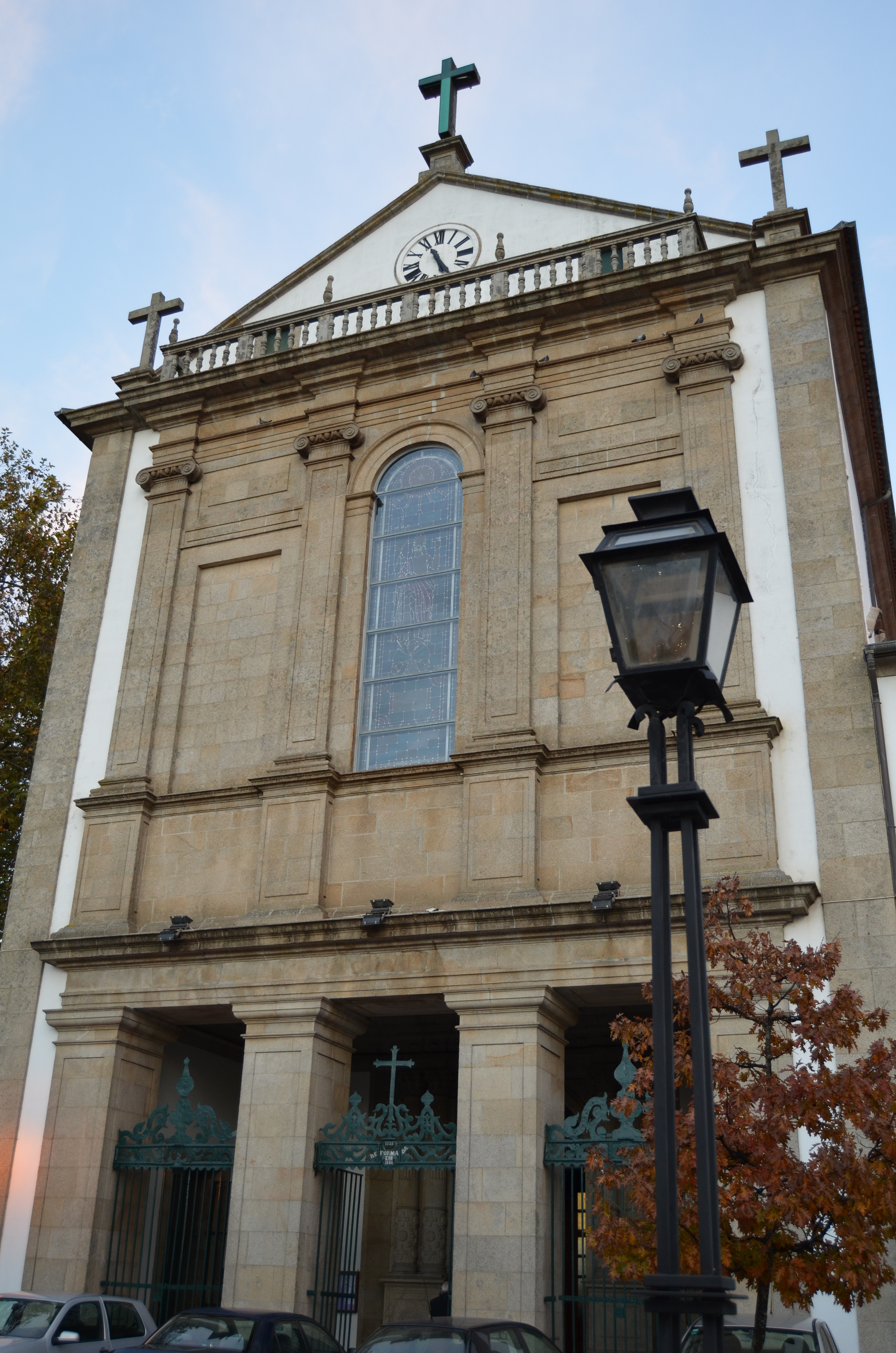
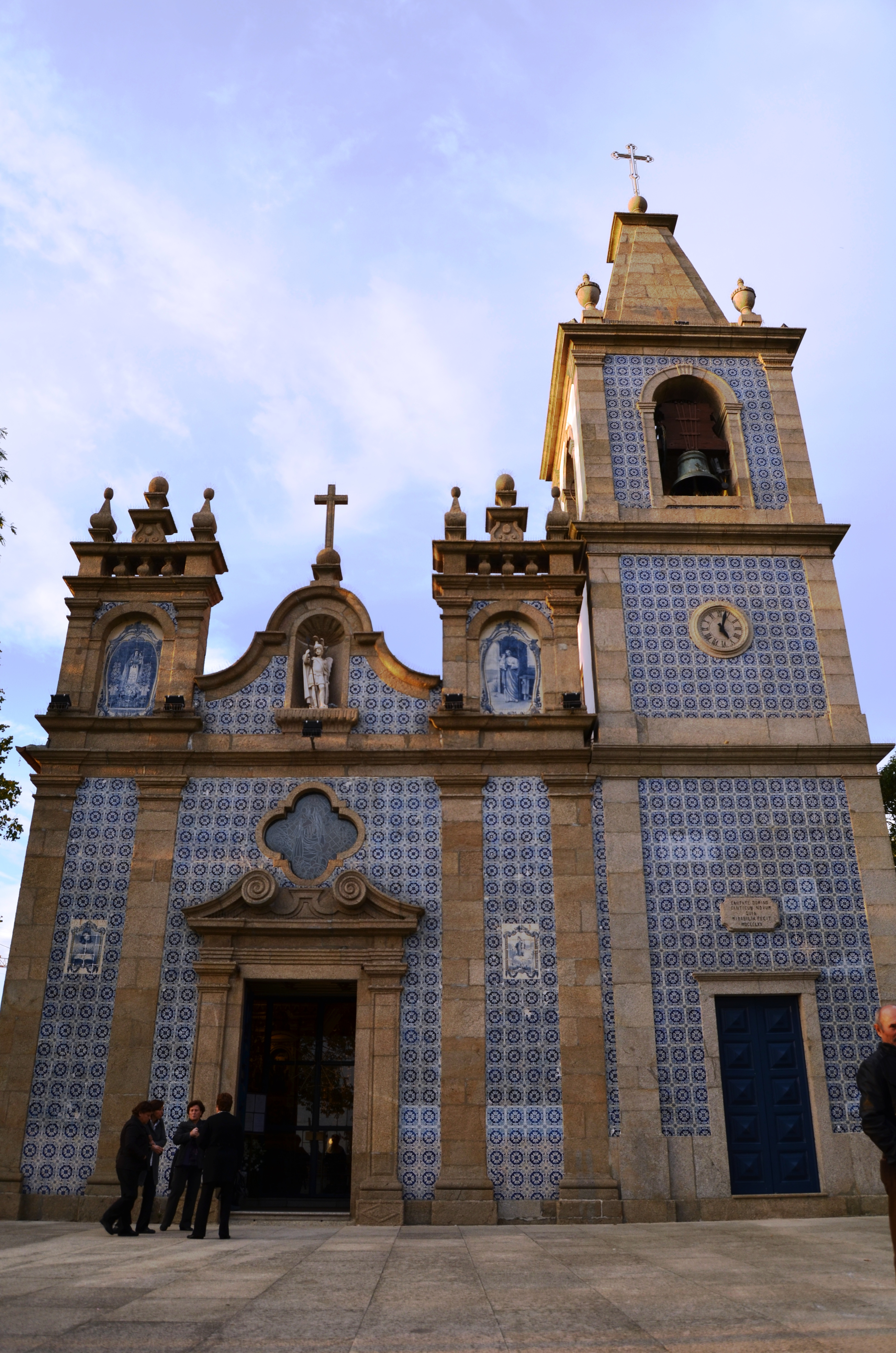
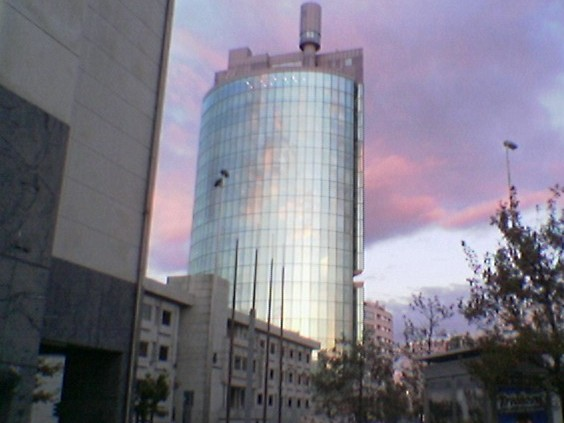
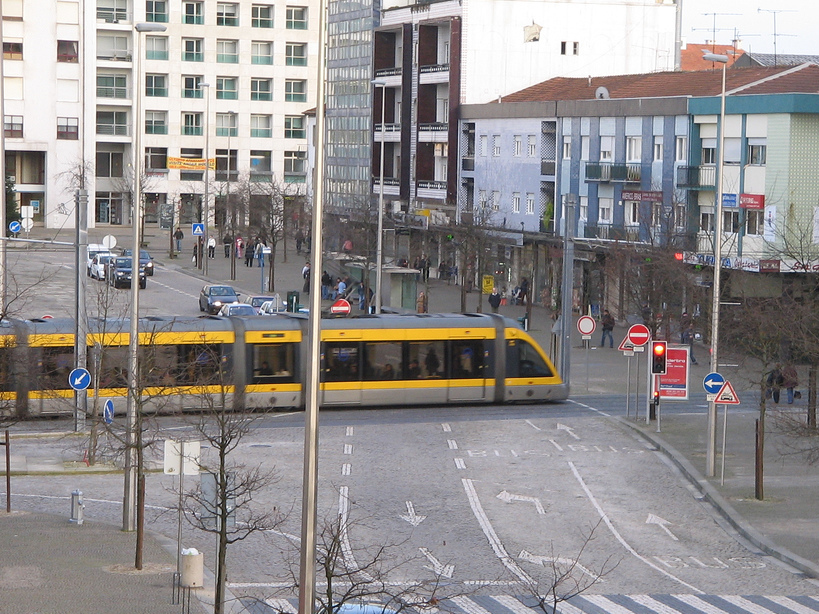

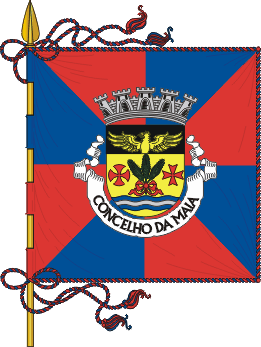
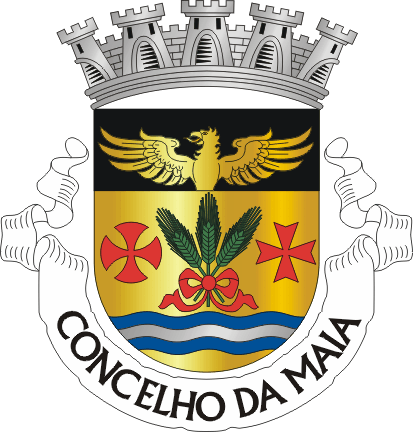
- Flag Coat of arms
- Interactive map of Maia
- Location in Portugal
- Coordinates: 41°14′N 8°37′W
- Country: Portugal
- Region: Norte
- Metropolitan area: Porto
- District: Porto
- Seat: Maia Municipal Chamber
- Parishes: 10

Government
  - President: António Silva Tiago (PSD)

Area
  - Total: 82.99 km^{2} (32.04 sq mi)

Population (2015)
  - Total: 135,678
  - Density: 1,635/km^{2} (4,234/sq mi)
- Time zone: UTC+00:00 (WET)
  - Summer (DST): UTC+01:00 (WEST)
- Website: www.cm-maia.pt

Maia (Portuguese pronunciation: [ˈmajɐ]) is a municipality in the Porto Metropolitan Area), Grande Porto subregion, in Norte Region, Portugal. It is located 11 km north of central Porto. The population in 2011 was 135,306, in an area of 82.99 km^{2} (32.04 sq mi). There is one city (Cidade da Maia) and three towns (Moreira, Castêlo da Maia and Águas Santas) in the municipality.

== History ==
The area of the current municipality (concelho) has been inhabited for millennia, with human occupation dating back to the Paleolithic period. In the many hills of the region, remains of villages from the Iron Age have been found. Attracted by the rich soil and abundance of resources, the Romans also left visible marks of their occupation in the area. In the middle of the thirteenth century, the Lands of Maia (Terras da Maia) extended from the city of Porto to the Ave river and from the sea to the mountains. In 1304 the Lands of Maia were incorporated into those of Porto, losing its political and administrative autonomy. In 1360, King Pedro I of Portugal gave the land of Azurara (current Vila do Conde), with land in Maia, to the then infant Denis, Lord of Cifuentes, his son.

The history of this municipality is also closely linked to the founding of the Portuguese nation. Some authors argue that even the Prince Afonso Henriques had been educated here, next to the family of Mendes da Maia, who belonged to the Arcebishop of Braga D. Paio Mendes and the famous warrior Gonçalo Mendes da Maia, the "Lidador" (today the hero of the city), named so for having entered into fearless struggle against the Saracens. In the Age of Discovery, the region of Maia produced sails and fabrics for use in the Portuguese caravels. At the beginning of the sixteenth century, the King Manuel I of Portugal granted the charter, which provided the rent to be paid to the donee Reguengos of Maia, and regulated how to carry out punishments and courts. Between 1700 and 1836, the county was composed of 44 parishes and encompassed the entire range between the sea and the Leça and Ave rivers.

With administrative reforms initiated in 1836, Maia became a separate municipality, but reduced both in area and number of parishes. In 1857, the municipality of Maia was no more, it was then restored in 1868. Maia municipality was crossed in 1809 by the Napoleonic army of the Duke of Dalmatia, the Marshal Soult, which was going from Braga to Porto. Between 1832 and 1834, in the turbulent years of struggles and civil war opposing Miguel of Portugal to Pedro IV of Portugal, it was the scene of bloody battles between the absolutist and the liberal factions.

== Economy ==
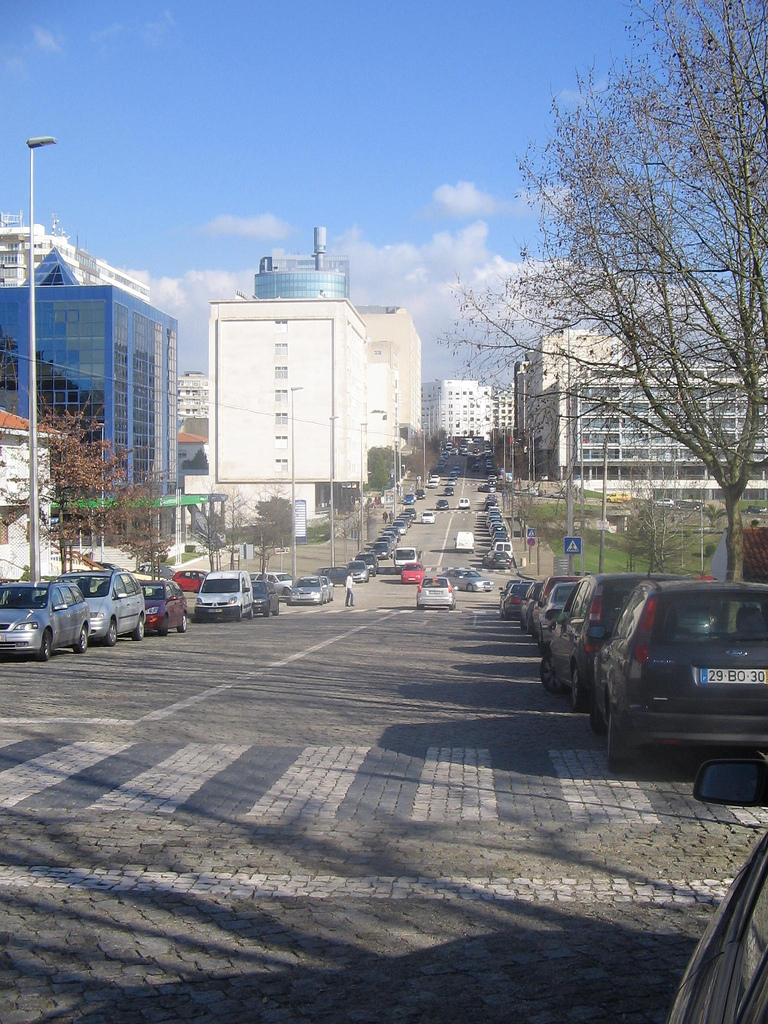
Visconde de Barreiros Avenue, Maia

The Maia municipality is one of the most industrialized in the Norte Region. Among its industries are Sonae Indústria, a leading wood-based products company; market leader for paint & coating products CIN; fruit processing company Frulact; and cereal processing company Cerealis, which are headquartered in there. Other industries include textiles, chemicals, mechanical equipment and food products (e.g. Ferbar - Fernando Barros Productos Alimentares, Lda., a major Portuguese wholesaler of food products). Sonae SGPS, owner of one of the largest hypermarket chains and the largest private employer in Portugal, is also headquartered in Maia. CEIIA - Centro para a Excelência e Inovação na Indústria Automóvel (auto industry innovation center), is located in TECMAIA (Parque de Ciência e Tecnologia da Maia complex), a science park situated in the Maia Industrial Zone. Prozis, a Portuguese multinational sports nutrition company, has a major research and development center in Maia.

== Demographics ==
Historical population

Year	Pop.	±%
1864	13,688	—
1878	15,810	+15.5%
1890	18,831	+19.1%
1900	20,367	+8.2%
1911	24,230	+19.0%
1920	26,112	+7.8%
1930	29,536	+13.1%
1940	37,026	+25.4%

Year	Pop.	±%
1950	43,906	+18.6%
1960	53,643	+22.2%
1970	63,980	+19.3%
1981	81,679	+27.7%
1991	93,151	+14.0%
2001	120,111	+28.9%
2011	135,306	+12.7%
2021	134,977	−0.2%

Source: INE

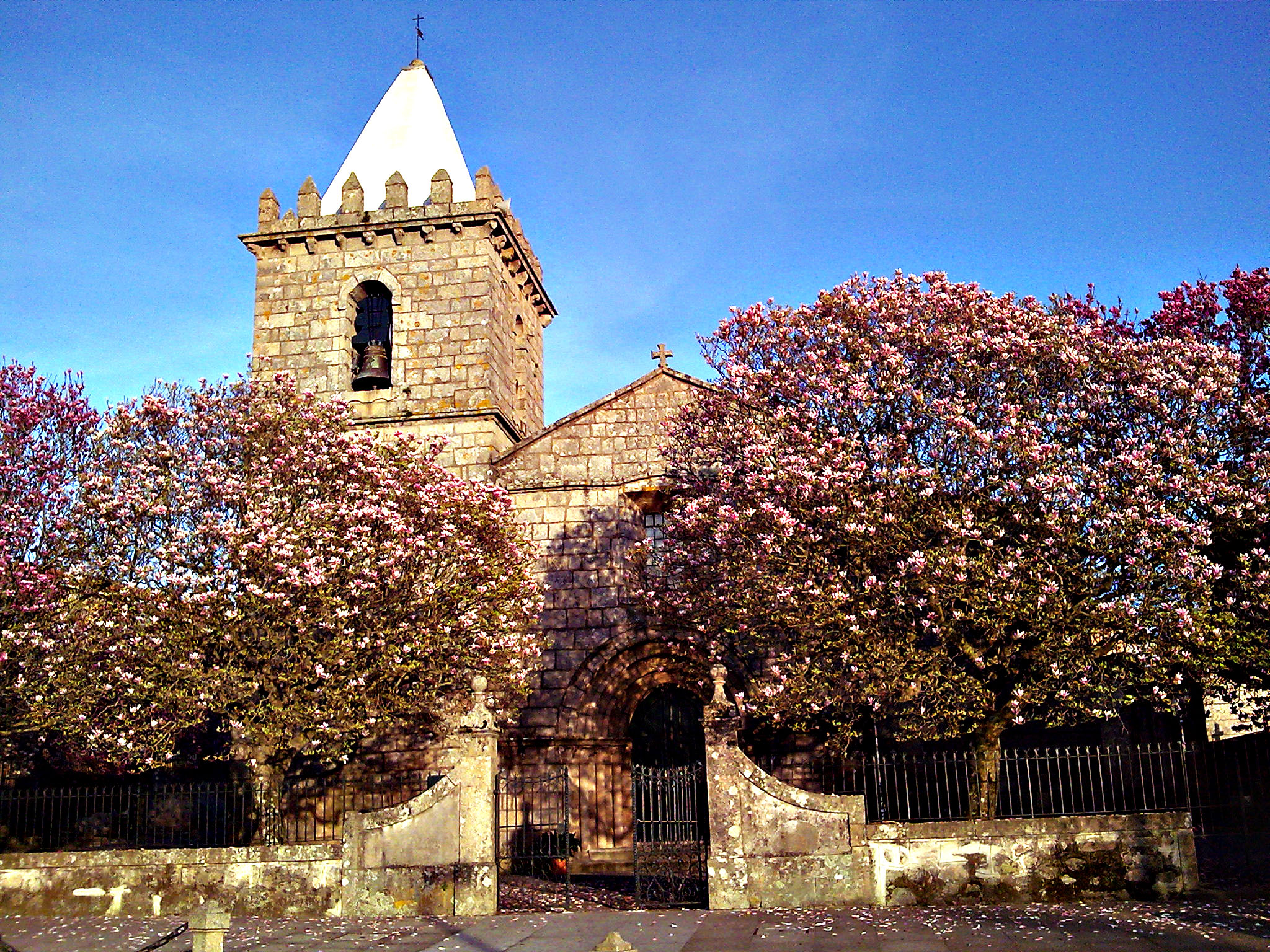
Nossa Senhora do Ó Church

== Education ==
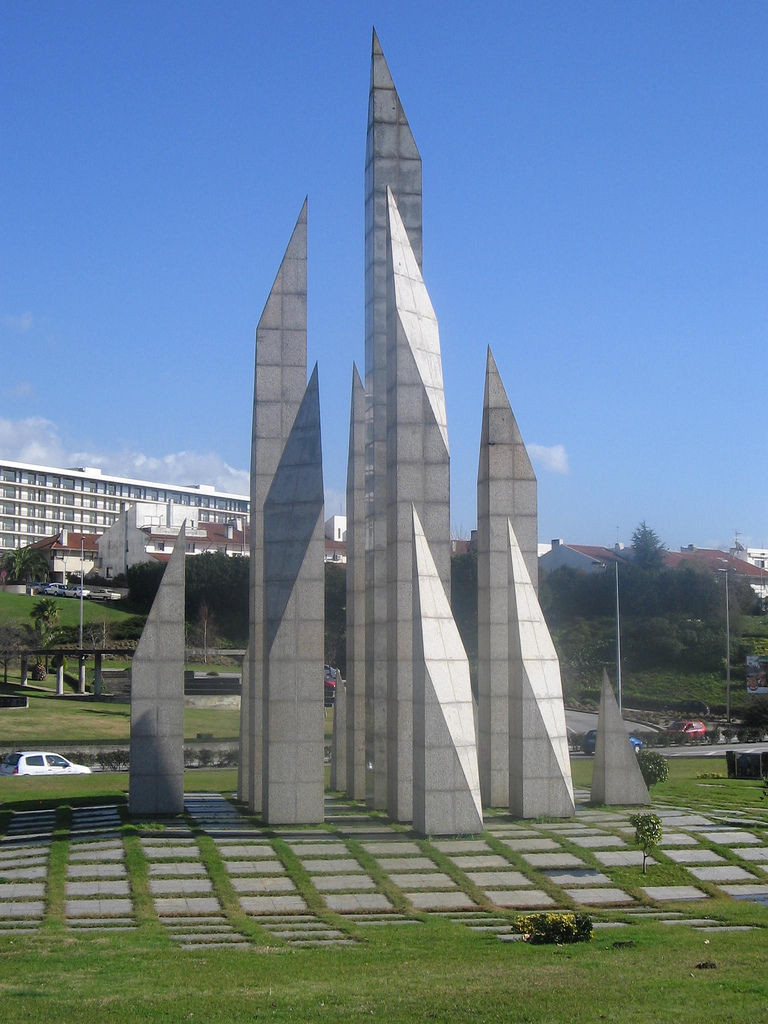
Monument to the People of Maia

Maia has a comprehensive network of pre-school, primary, and secondary education. In addition, Maia is home of ISMAI - Instituto Superior da Maia, a private institution of higher education awarding degrees in fields ranging from psychology to communication sciences to physical education & sports to accountancy to information systems & software. In addition, Maia's population is served by the major higher education institutions located in the neighbouring municipality of Porto, including the University of Porto.

== Transportation ==
The Porto International Airport, Francisco Sá Carneiro Airport (also known as Pedras Rubras Airport) is located in the parish of Moreira, in Pedras Rubras. The municipality is also served by Porto Metro (Porto's light rail network).

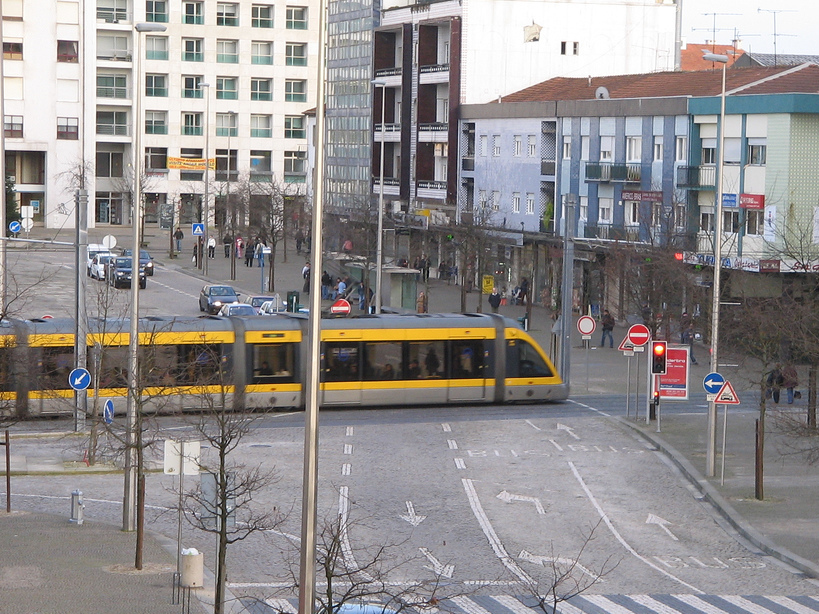
Porto Metro next to Maia's Forum.

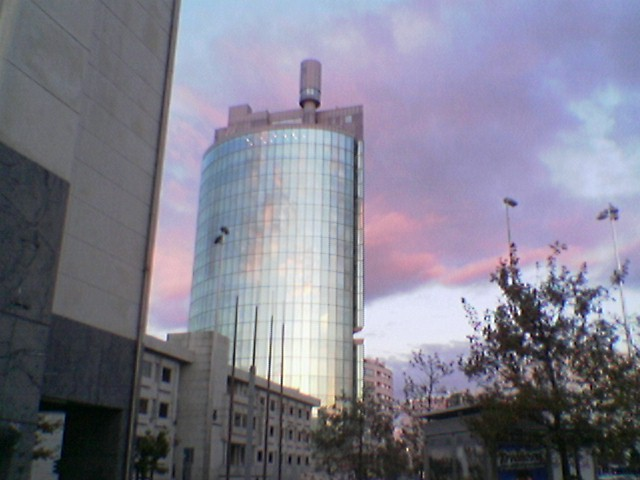
Maia's City Hall Lidador Tower

== International relations ==
The following places are sister cities to Maia:

- (Loire (department)) Andrézieux, Loire, Auvergne-Rhône-Alpes, France
- Mantes-La-Jolie, Yvelines, Île-de-France, France
- Portimão, Portugal
- Sault Ste. Marie, Ontario, Canada
- Mbombela, South Africa

== Sports ==
Maia is the hometown of two important sports organizations: the football club FC Maia, and the cycling team União Ciclista da Maia.

== Notable people ==
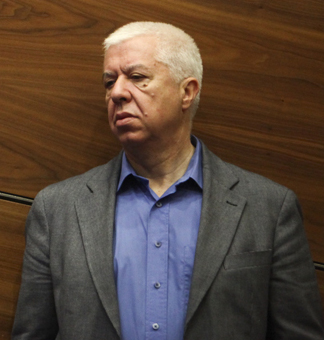
Teixeira dos Santos, 2009

- Gonçalo Mendes da Maia (ca.1079 — 1170), a Portuguese knight of the 12th century
- David Moreira da Silva (1909-2002) a Portuguese architect of the Porto School of Architecture
- Fernando Teixeira dos Santos (born 1951) a Portuguese economist and professor, former Minister of Finance of Portugal
- Sarah A. Hoyt (born 1962 in Águas Santas) an American science fiction, fantasy, mystery and historical fiction writer.
- João Torres (born 1986) a politician and Government Minister

=== Sport ===
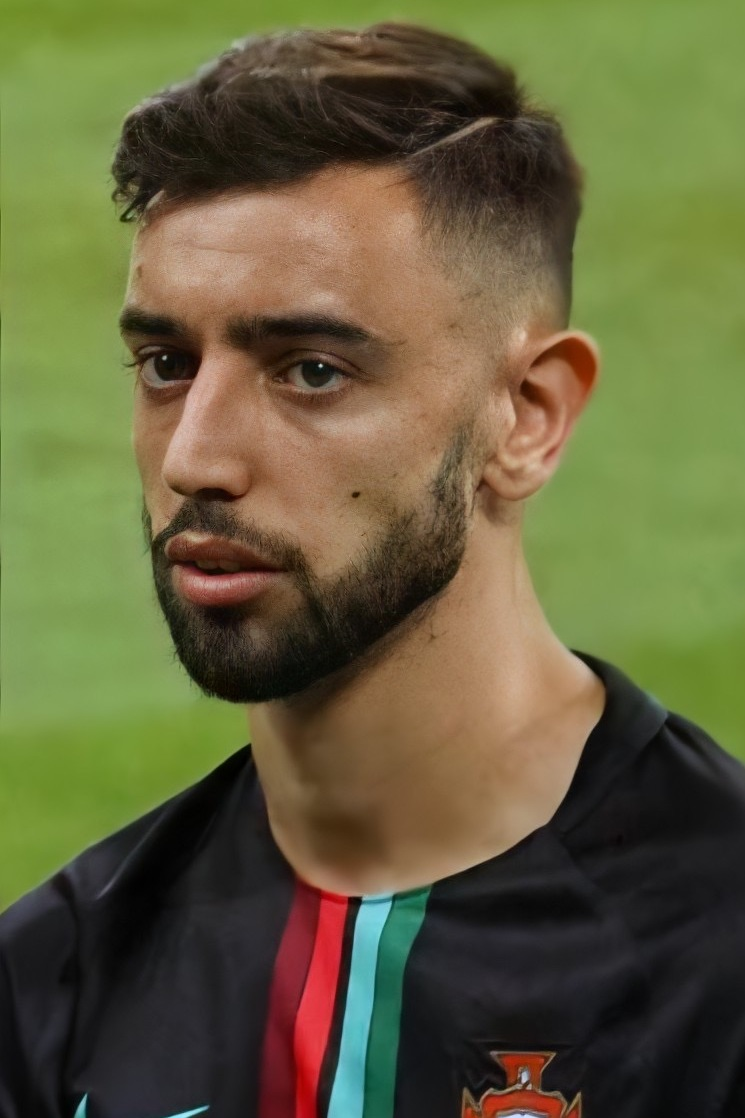
Bruno Fernandes, 2018

- Pedro Albergaria (born 1980), a Portuguese retired football goalkeeper with 423 club caps
- Ricardo Malafaia (born 1981), known as Malafaia, a Portuguese retired footballer with 344 club caps
- Hernâni Borges (born 1981), known as Hernâni, a former footballer with 255 club caps and 9 for Cape Verde
- Diogo Torres (born 1987), a Portuguese footballer with over 310 club caps
- Wilson Eduardo (born 1990), a footballer with over 250 club caps and 6 for Angola
- Bruno Fernandes (born 1994), a footballer who plays for Manchester United F.C. with over 270 club caps and 75 for Portugal
- Nuno Santos (born 1995), a footballer who plays for Sporting CP, with over 140 club caps and more than 400 caps on the Portuguese League
- Nuno Borges (born 1997), a Portuguese professional tennis player

== Parishes ==
Maia Municipality and its parishes before 2013.

Maia Municipality and its parishes after 2013.

Administratively, the municipality is divided into 10 civil parishes (freguesias):

- Águas Santas
- Castêlo da Maia
- Cidade da Maia
- Folgosa
- Milheirós
- Moreira
- Nogueira e Silva Escura
- Pedrouços
- São Pedro Fins
- Vila Nova da Telha
