= Grande Porto =

Former Portuguese sub region

Coordinates: 41.1500°N 8.6333°W

Map showing the location of the Grande Porto subregion

Grande Porto (Portuguese pronunciation: [ˈɡɾɐ̃dɨ ˈpoɾtu]) or Greater Porto is a former Portuguese NUTS3 subregion, integrating the NUTS2 region of Norte, in Portugal. It was abolished at the January 2015 NUTS 3 revision.

It corresponded to 11 municipalities out of 16, the other 5 in Entre Douro e Vouga Subregion that constitute the larger Greater Metropolitan Area of Porto, centered in the city of Porto. With a population of 2,181,805 inhabitants (INE 2011) and an area of 817 km^{2}. Highly industrialized, it is along with the neighbouring subregions the main source of the Portuguese exports and home to one of the busiest Portuguese harbours, located in Leixões. Grande Porto serves as the commercial, educational, cultural and economical centre of northern Portugal.

It covers an area of 817 km^{2} for a density of 2056 hab/km^{2}

== Municipalities ==
It is formed by 11 municipalities, on both sides of the Douro River.

- Espinho
- Gondomar
- Maia
- Matosinhos
- Porto
- Póvoa de Varzim
- Trofa (recently joined Grande Porto)
- Santo Tirso (recently joined)
- Valongo
- Vila do Conde
- Vila Nova de Gaia

All of the above municipalities are cities. Only Espinho and Gaia are located south of Douro River.

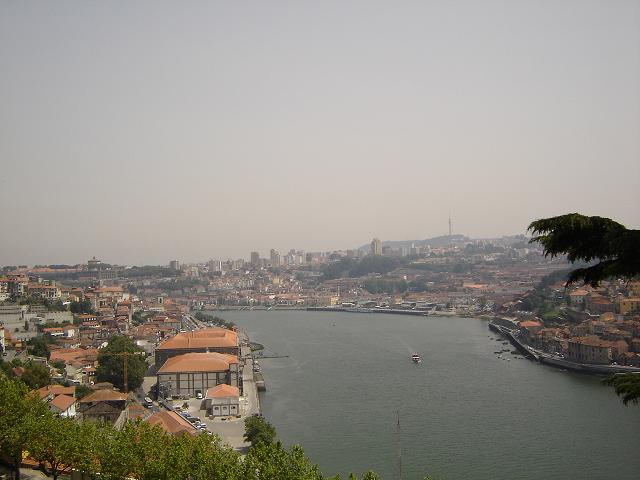
Douro River at Grande Porto, Portugal's second most populated subregion.

The conurbation, which includes the municipalities of Porto (pop. 240,000), Vila Nova de Gaia (pop. 330,000) and Matosinhos (pop. 175,000), are amongst the biggest urban centres in Portugal, although the subregion is considered a Metropolitan Area with a population of over a million.

== Transport ==
The subregion is served by an international airport: Porto/ Pedras Rubras / Maia (OPO), a harbour(Leixões/ Matosinhos), underground (Subway), intercity trains and a large network of highways and motorways. The industry is located in a crown around the city of Porto.
