= 2025–26 Amarante F.C. season =

Amarante
2025–26 season
- President: Ricardo Ribeiro
- Head coach: Eurico Couto (until 14 October); Alex Costa (from 17 October)
- Stadium: Estádio Municipal de Amarante
- Liga 3: 1st
- Taça de Portugal: Third round
- Top goalscorer: League: Tiago Ventura (6); All: Tiago Ventura; Daniel Rodrigues; Jordan Saint-Louis (8 each)
- Biggest win: Mafra 1–4 Amarante (19 April 2026)
- Biggest defeat: Fafe 3–0 Amarante (10 October 2025)
Home colours	Away colours	Third colours

The 2025–26 Amarante Futebol Clube season was the club's 103rd season in existence and 92nd season since joining official competitions. It was Amarante's 25th season in the third tier of Portuguese football and the 2nd in the Liga 3. Amarante also played in the Taça de Portugal.

Eurico Couto began the campaign as head coach but was dismissed in October after a spell of poor results which left the club second to last at the league table. Alex Costa was then appointed head coach for the remainder of the season.

Under Costa, Amarante recovered strongly and qualified for the promotion phase of Liga 3. On 10 May 2026, Amarante secured the club's first promotion to the professional leagues and its return to the second level of Portuguese football for the first time since 1988–89 by defeating União de Santarém 1–0. Six days later, it defeated Vitória de Guimarães B 3–1 away to win the Liga 3 title. In recognition of the 2025–26 campaign, four Amarante players were selected for the Liga 3 Team of the Year, while Tiago Ventura received the league's Revelation Player award. In July 2026, the Municipality of Amarante awarded the club the Municipal Medal of Merit in recognition of its Liga 3 title and historic promotion to Liga Portugal 2.

== Players ==
=== First-team squad ===
Note: Flags indicate national team as defined under FIFA eligibility rules; some limited exceptions apply. Players may hold more than one non-FIFA nationality.

No.	Pos.	Nation	Player
1	GK	POR	Martim Duarte
2	DF	POR	Obama Ribeiro
3	DF	GBS	Feliciano Mendes
4	DF	POR	João Filipe (captain)
5	MF	GHA	Harruna Iddriss (on loan from O Elvas)
6	MF	POR	Fernando Almeida
7	FW	POR	Moisés Conceição
8	MF	BFA	Faissal Zangré (on loan from Felgueiras)
9	FW	POR	Cardoso
10	MF	POR	Daniel Rodrigues
12	DF	NGR	Lawrence Adeniyi
13	GK	POR	Rafael Flores
17	MF	POR	Gonçalo Sousa
19	MF	POR	Gabriel Costa

No.	Pos.	Nation	Player
20	MF	CPV	Marcelo Cunha
22	DF	POR	Samuel Vivas
23	FW	USA	Jordan Saint-Louis
26	DF	POR	Diogo Nascimento
28	DF	POR	Rui Pedro (on loan from Paços de Ferreira)
30	MF	POR	Tiago Antunes
58	MF	POR	Afonso Meireles (on loan from Vitória de Guimarães B)
65	GK	POR	Rúben Pinto
71	MF	POR	Rúben Silva
80	FW	POR	Tiago Ventura
88	DF	POR	Eduardo Aguiar
90	FW	BRA	Roger Almeida
99	FW	NGR	Arome Idache

== Transfers ==
=== In ===
No.	Pos	Player	Transferred from	Fee	Date	Source
Summer transfers
10	MF	(Portugal) Daniel Rodrigues	(Portugal) Tirsense	Free	16 June 2025	
20	MF	(Cape Verde) Marcelo Cunha	(Portugal) Fátima	Free	16 June 2025	
22	DF	(Portugal) Samuel Vivas	(Portugal) Espinho	Free	25 June 2025	
6	MF	(Portugal) Fernando Almeida	(Portugal) Beira-Mar	Free	28 June 2025	
5	MF	(Ghana) Harruna Iddriss	(Portugal) O Elvas	Loan	6 July 2025	
3	DF	(Guinea-Bissau) Feliciano Mendes	(Portugal) Portimonense	Free	12 July 2025	
1	GK	(Portugal) Martim Duarte	(Portugal) Fátima	Free	16 July 2025	
80	FW	(Portugal) Tiago Ventura	(Portugal) Rebordosa	Free	16 July 2025	
28	DF	(Portugal) Rui Pedro	(Portugal) Paços de Ferreira	Loan	1 August 2025	
Winter transfers
7	FW	(Portugal) Moisés Conceição	(Portugal) Cinfães	Free	14 November 2025	
8	MF	(Burkina Faso) Faissal Zangré	(Portugal) Felgueiras	Loan	31 January 2026	
58	MF	(Portugal) Afonso Meireles	(Portugal) Vitória de Guimarães B	Loan	4 February 2026	
71	MF	(Portugal) Rúben Silva	(Romania) Politehnica Iasi	Free	5 March 2026	
Disclosed total
€0

=== Out ===
No.	Pos	Player	Transferred to	Fee	Date	Source
Summer transfers
12	MF	(Burkina Faso) Faissal Zangré	(Portugal) Felgueiras	Free	19 June 2025	
65	GK	(Portugal) Didi	(Portugal) Felgueiras	Free	19 June 2025	
10	FW	(Cape Verde) Ká Semedo	(Portugal) Fafe	Free	2 July 2025	
Winter transfers
8	MF	(Portugal) Hélder Pedro	(Portugal) Cinfães	Free	11 December 2025	
64	DF	(Portugal) Diogo Vila	(Portugal) Alpendorada	Free	7 January 2026	
Disclosed total
€0

== Pre-season and friendlies ==
Win Draw Loss

19 July 2025 Friendly	Amarante (Portugal)	0–2	(Portugal) Sporting CP B	Amarante, Portugal
		Report	19' Gabriel Silva; 77' Rafael Besugo	Stadium: Estádio Municipal de Amarante

23 July 2025 Friendly	Amarante (Portugal)	0–0	(Portugal) Feirense	Amarante, Portugal
		Report		Stadium: Estádio Municipal de Amarante

30 July 2025 Friendly	Chaves (Portugal)	0–2	(Portugal) Amarante	Freamunde, Portugal
		Report		Stadium: Complexo Desportivo do SC Freamunde

== Competitions ==
=== Overall record ===
Competition	First match	Last match	Starting round	Final position	Record							
Competition	First match	Last match	Starting round	Final position	Pld	W	D	L	GF	GA	GD	Win %
Liga 3	8 August 2025	16 May 2026	Matchday 1	1	32	17	9	6	41	28	+13	53.13
Taça de Portugal	31 August 2026	19 October 2026	First round	Third round	3	2	0	1	2	0	+2	66.67
Total					35	19	9	7	43	28	+15	54.29

Last updated: 16 May 2026
Source: Soccerway

=== Liga 3 ===
==== First stage ====
Pos	Team	Pld	W	D	L	GF	GA	GD	Pts	Qualification
1	Vitória SC B	18	8	5	5	20	16	+4	29	Qualification for Promotion Stage
2	Amarante	18	8	5	5	19	17	+2	29	Qualification for Promotion Stage
3	Trofense	18	7	7	4	23	15	+8	28	Qualification for Promotion Stage
4	Varzim	18	7	7	4	26	17	+9	28	Qualification for Promotion Stage
5	Paredes	18	6	9	3	22	12	+10	27	Qualification for Relegation Stage

Source: Liga 3

===== Results summary =====
Overall								Home						Away					
Pld	W	D	L	GF	GA	GD	Pts	W	D	L	GF	GA	GD	W	D	L	GF	GA	GD
18	8	5	5	19	17	+2	29	4	3	2	12	10	+2	4	2	3	7	7	0

Source: Liga 3

===== Results by round =====
Round	1	2	3	4	5	6	7	8	9	10	11	12	13	14	15	16	17	18
Ground	H	A	H	A	A	H	A	H	A	A	H	A	H	H	A	H	A	H
Result	L	W	D	L	L	D	L	W	W	D	L	W	W	W	W	W	D	D
Position	8	4	5	7	9	9	9	7	6	7	8	6	4	2	1	1	1	2
Points	0	3	4	4	4	5	5	8	11	12	12	15	18	21	24	27	28	29

Source: Liga 3
A = Away; H = Home; W = Win; D = Draw; L = Loss
Notes:
- Positions show the situation at the end of the corresponding Game Weeks (GW), not the position at the conclusion of matches or game days.

===== Matches =====
8 August 2025 1	Amarante	0–1	Varzim	Amarante
16:00 WEST (UTC+1)		Report	Oliveira 90'	Stadium: Estádio Municipal de Amarante

17 August 2025 2	Vitória de Guimarães B	2–3	Amarante	Guimarães
11:00 WEST (UTC+1)	Nogueira 42'; Nogueira 84' (pen.)	Report	Rodrigues 63'; Almeida 71' (pen.); Rui Pedro 90'	Stadium: Academia Vitória Sport Clube

24 August 2025 3	Amarante	0–0	Sanjoanense	Amarante
16:00 WEST (UTC+1)		Report		Stadium: Estádio Municipal de Amarante

14 September 2025 4	Marco 09	1–0	Amarante	Marco de Canaveses
15:30 WEST (UTC+1)	Agostinho 57'	Report		Stadium: Estádio Municipal do Marco de Canaveses

28 September 2025 6	Amarante	2–2	São João de Ver	Amarante
15:00 WEST (UTC+1)	Rodrigues 21'; Adeniyi 75'	Report	Serrão 3'; Oliveira 7'	Stadium: Estádio Municipal de Amarante

5 October 2025 7	Braga B	1–0	Amarante	Braga
11:00 WEST (UTC+1)	Vasconcelos 81' (pen.)	Report		Stadium: Estádio Amélia Morais

10 October 2025 5	Fafe	3–0	Amarante	Fafe
20:00 WEST (UTC+1)	Santos 12'; Santos 56'; Semedo 67'	Report		Stadium: Estádio Municipal de Fafe

26 October 2025 8	Amarante	1–0	Paredes	Amarante
20:00 WEST (UTC+1)	Brito 82' (o.g.)	Report		Stadium: Estádio Municipal de Amarante

2 November 2025 9	Trofense	0–1	Amarante	Trofa
15:00 WEST (UTC+1)		Report	Ventura 25'	Stadium: Estádio do CD Trofense

9 November 2025 10	Varzim	0–0	Amarante	Póvoa de Varzim
20:00 WEST (UTC+1)		Report		Stadium: Estádio do Varzim SC

29 November 2025 11	Amarante	1–2	Vitória de Guimarães B	Amarante
15:00 WEST (UTC+1)	Vivas 66'	Report	Nogueira 3'; Paula 19'	Stadium: Estádio Municipal de Amarante

6 December 2025 12	Sanjoanense	0–2	Amarante	São João da Madeira
15:00 WEST (UTC+1)		Report	Saint-Louis 11'; Cunha 90'	Stadium: Estádio Conde Dias Garcia

14 December 2025 13	Amarante	3–2	Marco 09	Amarante
15:00 WEST (UTC+1)	Rodrigues 19'; Saint-Louis 60'; Saint-Louis 80'	Report	Silva 38'; V. Sousa 68'	Stadium: Estádio Municipal de Amarante

21 December 2025 14	Amarante	3–2	Fafe	Amarante
15:00 WEST (UTC+1)	João Filipe 37'; Ventura 76'; Idache 90'	Report	Semedo 45' (pen.); Carlos Daniel 55'	Stadium: Estádio Municipal de Amarante

4 January 2026 15	São João de Ver	0–1	Amarante	Santa Maria da Feira
15:00 WEST (UTC+1)		Report	Ventura 24'	Stadium: Estádio Sporting Clube São João de Ver

11 January 2026 16	Amarante	1–0	Braga B	Amarante
15:00 WEST (UTC+1)	Rodrigues 60' (pen.)	Report		Stadium: Estádio Municipal de Amarante

18 January 2026 17	Paredes	0–0	Amarante	Paredes
15:00 WEST (UTC+1)		Report		Stadium: Estádio Municipal das Laranjeiras

25 January 2026 18	Amarante	1–1	Trofense	Amarante
15:00 WEST (UTC+1)	Aguiar 76'	Report	Oliveira 37'	Stadium: Estádio Municipal de Amarante

==== Promotion stage ====
Pos	Team	Pld	W	D	L	GF	GA	GD	Pts	Promotion or qualification
1	Amarante	14	9	4	1	22	11	+11	31	Promotion to Liga Portugal 2
2	Académica de Coimbra	14	8	4	2	23	13	+10	28	Promotion to Liga Portugal 2
3	Belenenses	14	7	5	2	25	16	+9	26	Qualification for the Promotion play-off
4	Mafra	14	5	2	7	17	24	−7	17	
5	Vitória SC B	14	4	5	5	16	17	−1	17	

Source: Liga 3

===== Results summary =====
Overall								Home						Away					
Pld	W	D	L	GF	GA	GD	Pts	W	D	L	GF	GA	GD	W	D	L	GF	GA	GD
14	9	4	1	22	11	+11	31	5	2	0	9	4	+5	4	2	1	13	7	+6

Source: Liga 3

===== Results by round =====
Round	1	2	3	4	5	6	7	8	9	10	11	12	13	14
Ground	A	H	H	A	H	A	H	H	A	A	H	A	H	A
Result	L	D	W	W	W	W	W	W	D	W	D	D	W	W
Position	6	6	5	2	2	2	2	1	1	1	1	1	1	1
Points	0	1	4	7	10	13	16	19	20	23	24	25	28	31

Source: Liga 3
A = Away; H = Home; W = Win; D = Draw; L = Loss
Notes:
- Positions show the situation at the end of the corresponding Game Weeks (GW), not the position at the conclusion of matches or game days.

===== Matches =====
7 February 2026 1	Varzim	2–1	Amarante	Póvoa de Varzim
15:00 WEST (UTC+1)	Alfandega 42'; Gunjo 90'	Report	Saint-Louis 70'	Stadium: Estádio do Varzim SC

21 February 2026 3	Amarante	1–0	Mafra	Amarante
15:00 WEST (UTC+1)	Ventura 21'	Report		Stadium: Estádio Municipal de Amarante

1 March 2026 4	Os Belenenses	1–2	Amarante	Lisbon
18:00 WEST (UTC+1)	Souza 42'	Report	Ventura 2'; Saint-Louis 70'	Stadium: Estádio do Restelo

8 March 2026 5	Amarante	1–0	Trofense	Amarante
15:00 WEST (UTC+1)	João Filipe 90'	Report		Stadium: Estádio Municipal de Amarante

14 March 2026 6	União de Santarém	1–2	Amarante	Santarém
16:00 WEST (UTC+1)	Nogueira 33'	Report	Rodrigues 80' (pen.); Saint-Louis 90'	Stadium: Campo Chã das Padeiras

22 March 2026 7	Amarante	2–1	Vitória de Guimarães B	Amarante
13:00 WEST (UTC+1)	Rodrigues 52'; Ventura 72'	Report	Verdi 45'	Stadium: Estádio Municipal de Amarante

29 March 2026 2	Amarante	1–1	Académica de Coimbra	Amarante
15:00 WEST (UTC+1)	Saint-Louis 66'	Report	Fragozo 88'	Stadium: Estádio Municipal de Amarante

4 April 2026 8	Amarante	1–0	Varzim	Amarante
15:00 WEST (UTC+1)	Ventura 19'	Report		Stadium: Estádio Municipal de Amarante

12 April 2026 9	Académica de Coimbra	1–1	Amarante	Coimbra
19:00 WEST (UTC+1)	Santos 16'	Report	Ventura 43'	Stadium: Estádio Cidade de Coimbra

19 April 2026 10	Mafra	1–4	Amarante	Mafra
15:00 WEST (UTC+1)	Iheanacho 83'	Report	Ventura 2'; Zangré 63'; Rodrigues 68'; Idache 90'	Stadium: Estádio Municipal de Mafra

26 April 2026 11	Amarante	2–2	Os Belenenses	Amarante
16:30 WEST (UTC+1)	Barros 45' (o.g.); Saint-Louis 90'	Report	Afonso 45'; Lopes 71' (pen.)	Stadium: Estádio Municipal de Amarante

1 May 2026 12	Trofense	0–0	Amarante	Trofa
15:00 WEST (UTC+1)		Report		Stadium: Estádio do CD Trofense

10 May 2026 13	Amarante	1–0	União de Santarém	Amarante
14:45 WEST (UTC+1)	Idache 83'	Report		Stadium: Estádio Municipal de Amarante

16 May 2026 14	Vitória de Guimarães B	1–3	Amarante	Guimarães
16:30 WEST (UTC+1)	Tepe 90'	Report	Rui Pedro 10'; João Filipe 19'; Idache 39'	Stadium: Academia Vitória Sport Clube

=== Taça de Portugal ===
31 August 2025 First round	Tirsense	1–2	Amarante	Santo Tirso
17:00 WEST (UTC+1)	Figueiredo 12' (pen.)	Report	Almeida 1'; Daniel Rodrigues 39' (pen.)	Stadium: Estádio Abel Alves de Figueiredo

21 September 2025 Second round	Amarante	2–0	União de Santarém	Amarante
15:00 WEST (UTC+1)	Reis 16' (o.g.); Adeniyi 55'	Report		Stadium: Estádio Municipal de Amarante

19 October 2025 Third round	Amarante	1–2	Leixões	Amarante
15:00 WEST (UTC+1)	Ribeiro 57'	Report	Valente 62'; Paulité 108'	Stadium: Estádio Municipal de Amarante

== Statistics ==
=== Appearances and goals ===
As of 16 of May.

No.	Pos	Nat	Player	Total		Liga 3		Taça de Portugal	
No.	Pos	Nat	Player	Apps	Goals	Apps	Goals	Apps	Goals
Goalkeepers
1	GK	(Portugal) POR	Martim Duarte	34	0	31	0	3	0
13	GK	(Portugal) POR	Rafael Flores	1	0	1	0	0	0
65	GK	(Portugal) POR	Rúben Pinto	0	0	0	0	0	0
Defenders
2	DF	(Portugal) POR	Obama Ribeiro	28	1	14+11	0	2+1	1
3	DF	(Portugal) POR	Feliciano Mendes	32	0	29	0	3	0
4	DF	(Portugal) POR	João Filipe	30	3	27	3	3	0
12	DF	(Nigeria) NGR	Lawrence Adeniyi	9	2	7	1	2	1
22	DF	(Portugal) POR	Samuel Vivas	27	1	24+2	1	1	0
26	DF	(Portugal) POR	Diogo Nascimento	1	0	1	0	0	0
28	DF	(Portugal) POR	Rui Pedro	34	2	31	2	3	0
88	DF	(Portugal) POR	Eduardo Aguiar	12	1	9+2	1	1	0
Midfielders
5	MF	(Ghana) GHA	Harruna Iddriss	33	0	22+8	0	1+2	0
6	MF	(Portugal) POR	Fernando Almeida	34	0	31	0	3	0
8	MF	(Burkina Faso) BFA	Faissal Zangré	14	1	10+4	1	0	0
10	MF	(Portugal) POR	Daniel Rodrigues	34	8	21+10	7	3	1
17	MF	(Portugal) POR	Gonçalo Sousa	1	0	0+1	0	0	0
19	MF	(Portugal) POR	Gabriel Costa	0	0	0	0	0	0
20	MF	(Cape Verde) CPV	Marcelo Cunha	29	1	15+11	1	2+1	0
30	MF	(Portugal) POR	Tiago Antunes	20	1	2+16	1	1+1	0
58	MF	(Portugal) POR	Afonso Meireles	10	0	1+9	0	0	0
71	MF	(Portugal) POR	Rúben Silva	1	0	0+1	0	0	0
Forwards
7	FW	(Portugal) POR	Moisés Conceição	20	0	3+17	0	0	0
9	FW	(Portugal) POR	Cardoso	1	0	0+1	0	0	0
23	FW	(United States) USA	Jordan Saint-Louis	33	8	28+2	8	1+2	0
80	FW	(Portugal) POR	Tiago Ventura	28	8	23+4	8	0+1	0
90	FW	(Brazil) BRA	Roger Almeida	14	2	6+5	1	3	1
99	FW	(Nigeria) NGR	Arome Idache	32	4	8+21	4	0+3	0
Players who made an appearance but left the team.
8	MF	(Portugal) POR	Hélder Pedro	14	0	3+8	0	0+3	0
42	DF	(Nigeria) NGR	Emmanuel Iroanya	1	0	0+1	0	0	0
64	DF	(Portugal) POR	Diogo Vila	6	0	5	0	1	0
