= List of football stadiums in Portugal =

The following is a list of football stadiums in Portugal, ranked in order of capacity, with the minimum capacity being 2,000. Stadiums in bold are part of the 2026–27 Primeira Liga.

== Current stadiums ==
#	Image	Stadium	Capacity	City	Home team	UEFA rank
1		**Estádio da Luz**	68,100	Lisbon	S.L. Benfica	4/4 stars
2		**Estádio José Alvalade**	52,095	Lisbon	Sporting CP	4/4 stars
3		**Estádio do Dragão**	50,033	Porto	FC Porto	4/4 stars
4		Estádio Nacional	37,593	Oeiras	Portugal national football team	
5		Estádio Municipal de Aveiro	32,830	Aveiro	S.C. Beira-Mar	4/4 stars
6		Estádio Algarve	30,305	Faro / Loulé	Louletano D.C. S.C. Farense	4/4 stars
7		**Estádio Municipal de Braga**	30,286	Braga	S.C. Braga	4/4 stars
8		**Estádio D. Afonso Henriques**	30,029	Guimarães	Vitória S.C.	4/4 stars
9		Estádio Cidade de Coimbra	29,622	Coimbra	Académica de Coimbra	4/4 stars
10		Estádio do Bessa Século XXI	28,263	Porto	Boavista F.C.	4/4 stars
11		Estádio 1º de Maio	28,000	Braga	No tenant	
12		Estádio Dr. Magalhães Pessoa	23,888	Leiria	U.D. Leiria	4/4 stars
13		Estádio Alfredo da Silva	21,498	Barreiro	G.D. Fabril	
14		Estádio do Restelo	19,856	Lisbon	C.F. Os Belenenses	3/4 stars
15		Estádio do Bonfim	15,497	Setúbal	Vitória F.C.	
16		**Estádio de São Miguel**	12,500	Ponta Delgada	C.D. Santa Clara	3/4 stars
17		**Estádio Cidade de Barcelos**	12,046	Barcelos	Gil Vicente F.C.	3/4 stars
18		Estádio Municipal Dr. José Vieira de Carvalho	12,000	Maia	F.C. Maia	
19		Estádio Municipal Dr. Alves Vieira	11,500	Torres Novas	C.D. Torres Novas	
20		**Estádio do Marítimo**	10,600	Funchal	C.S. Marítimo	3/4 stars
21		Estádio Municipal de Águeda	10,000	Águeda	R.D. Águeda	
22		Estádio do Mar	9,730; 6,000 (LP)	Matosinhos	Leixões S.C.	
23		**Estádio José Gomes**	9,288	Amadora	C.F. Estrela da Amadora	
24		Estádio Capital do Móvel	9,076	Paços de Ferreira	F.C. Paços de Ferreira	3/4 stars
25		Estádio Municipal José Bento Pessoa	9,000	Figueira da Foz	Associação Naval 1º de Maio	
26		Estádio Manuel Moreira	9,000	Rebordosa	Rebordosa A.C.	
27		Estádio Comendador Henrique Amorim	9,000	Santa Maria de Lamas	C.F. União de Lamas	
28		Estádio Dr. Jorge Sampaio	8,500	Pedroso, Vila Nova de Gaia	FC Porto B	
29		Estádio Conde Dias Garcia	8,500	São João da Madeira	A.D. Sanjoanense	
30		Estádio Municipal de Chaves	8,400	Chaves	G.D. Chaves	
31		**Estádio António Coimbra da Mota**	8,000; 5,094 (LP)	Estoril	G.D. Estoril Praia	
32		Estádio Abel Alves de Figueiredo	8,000	Santo Tirso	F.C. Tirsense	
33		Estádio Dr. Machado de Matos	7,540	Felgueiras	F.C. Felgueiras 1932	
34		Estádio Capitão César Correia	7,500	Campo Maior	S.C. Campomaiorense	
35		Estádio do Varzim SC	7,280	Póvoa de Varzim	Varzim S.C.	
36		Estádio de São Luís	7,000	Faro	S.C. Farense	
37		**Estádio Municipal de Rio Maior**	7,000	Rio Maior	U.D. Rio Maior	
38		Estádio Municipal de Alpendorada	7,000	Alpendorada	F.C. Alpendorada	
39		Estádio João Paulo II	7,000	Angra do Heroísmo	S.C. Lusitânia	
40		Estádio Municipal de Bragança	7,000	Bragança	G.D. Bragança	
41		Estádio do Canelas	7,000	Canelas, Vila Nova de Gaia	C.F. Canelas 2010	
42		**Complexo Desportivo do FC Alverca**	6,932	Alverca do Ribatejo	F.C. Alverca	
43		**Estádio do Fontelo**	6,912	Viseu	Académico de Viseu F.C.	
44		Estádio Municipal Eng. Sílvio Henriques Cerveira	6,500	Anadia	Anadia F.C.	
45		Estádio Municipal da Lavandeira	6,500	Oliveira do Douro, Vila Nova de Gaia	A.C. Gervide; C.D. Torrão	
46		Estádio do CD Aves	6,230	Vila das Aves, Santo Tirso	C.D. Aves	
47		Estádio Patalino	6,200	Elvas	O Elvas C.A.D.	
48		Estádio Municipal de Seia	6,177	Seia	Seia F.C.	
49		**Parque de Jogos Comendador Joaquim de Almeida Freitas**	6,150	Moreira de Cónegos, Guimarães	Moreirense F.C.	
50		Estádio do Futebol Clube de Vizela	6,000	Vizela	F.C. Vizela	
51		Estádio Municipal do Marco de Canaveses	6,000	Marco de Canaveses	F.C. Marco	
52		Estádio do G.D. Peniche	6,000	Peniche	G.D. Peniche	
53		Campo da Mata	5,700	Caldas da Rainha	Caldas S.C.	
54		Estádio do Bolhão	5,700	Fiães	Fiães S.C.	
55		Estádio José Arcanjo	5,661	Olhão	S.C. Olhanense	
56		**Estádio Municipal de Arouca**	5,600	Arouca	F.C. Arouca	
57		Estádio Marcolino de Castro	5,401	Santa Maria da Feira	C.D. Feirense	
58		**Estádio do Rio Ave FC**	5,300	Vila do Conde	Rio Ave F.C.	
59		Estádio Municipal 25 de Abril	5,230	Penafiel	F.C. Penafiel	
60		**Estádio da Madeira**	5,200	Funchal	C.D. Nacional	
61		Estádio Municipal da Marinha Grande	5,200	Marinha Grande	A.C. Marinhense	
62		**Estádio Municipal 22 de Junho**	5,186	Vila Nova de Famalicão	F.C. Famalicão	
63		Estádio Mário Wilson	5,097	Oeiras	A.D. Oeiras	
64		Estádio do Clube Desportivo Trofense	5,074	Trofa	C.D. Trofense	
65		Estádio João Cardoso	5,000	Tondela	C.D. Tondela	
66		Estádio Municipal de Amarante	5,000	Amarante	Amarante F.C.	
67		Estádio SC São João de Ver	5,000	São João de Ver	S.C. São João de Ver	
68		Campo Chã das Padeiras	5,000	Santarém	U.D. Santarém	
69		Estádio Municipal Monte da Forca	5,000	Vila Real	S.C. Vila Real	
70		Estádio Municipal Prof. Cerveira Pinto	5,000	Cinfães	C.D. Cinfães	
71		Campo Eng. José Carlos Macedo	5,000	Amares	F.C. Amares	
72		Estádio do Mergulhão	5,000	Cesar	F.C. Cesarense	
73		Estádio Joaquim Maria Baptista	5,000	Alcanena	A.C. Alcanenense	
74		Estádio Municipal de Portalegre	5,000	Portalegre	C.D. Portalegrense	
75		Estádio Municipal de Portimão	4,961	Portimão	Portimonense S.C.	
76		Estádio do Lusitânia de Lourosa FC	4,900	Lourosa	Lusitânia F.C.	
77		Estádio do Leça Futebol Clube	4,529	Leça da Palmeira	Leça F.C.	
78		Estádio da Tapadinha	4,000	Lisbon	Atlético Clube de Portugal	
79		Campo Estrela	4,000	Évora	Lusitano de Évora	
80		Estádio Municipal de Fafe	4,000	Fafe	A.D. Fafe	
81		Estádio das Seixas	4,000	Malveira	A.C. Malveira	
82		Complexo Desportivo do SC Freamunde	3,919	Freamunde	S.C. Freamunde	
83		Complexo Desportivo da Covilhã	3,000	Covilhã	S.C. Covilhã	
84		Estádio Manuel Marques	2,431	Torres Vedras	S.C.U. Torreense	

== Future stadiums ==
Stadiums with a capacity of at least 4,000 are included.

Stadium	Capacity	City	Home team	Opening	UEFA rank
Estádio Municipal de Famalicão	10,000	Vila Nova de Famalicão	F.C. Famalicão	2029	3/4 stars
Estádio do Moreirense FC	10,000	Moreira de Cónegos, Guimarães	Moreirense F.C.	2030	3/4 stars
Estádio Municipal de Espinho	5,201	Espinho	S.C. Espinho	2028	

== See also ==
- Football in Portugal
- List of European stadiums by capacity
- List of association football stadiums by capacity
- List of association football stadiums by country
- List of sports venues by capacity
- Lists of stadiums
