= 2025–26 Liga 3 (Portugal) =

3rd season of the Liga 3 (Portugal)

Liga 3
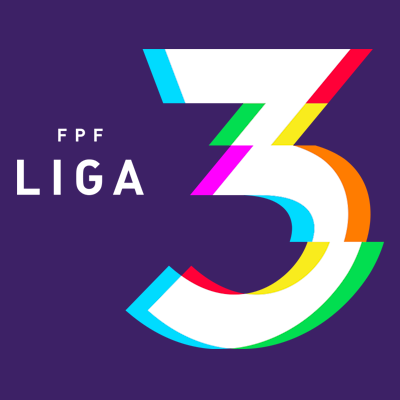
- Season: 2025–26
- Dates: 8 August 2025 – 18 May 2026
- Champions: Amarante
- Promoted: Académica de Coimbra; Amarante
- Relegated: 1.º Dezembro; Amora; Braga B Sanjoanense

The 2025–26 Liga 3 was the fifth season of Portuguese football's third-tier league, and the 79th season of recognised third-tier football in Portugal.

== Format ==
This competition consists of a first stage with all the teams then proceed to a promotion or relegation series depending on their performance.

== Teams ==
A total of 20 teams will contest the league, including 1 team relegated from the 2024–25 Liga Portugal 2, 14 teams from the 2024–25 Liga 3 and 5 teams promoted from the 2024–25 Campeonato de Portugal.

=== Team changes ===
Relegated from 2024–25 Liga Portugal 2

- Mafra

Promoted from 2024–25 Campeonato de Portugal

- Lusitano Évora
- Vitória SC B
- Paredes
- Amora
- Marco 09

Promoted to 2025–26 Liga Portugal 2

- Lusitânia Lourosa
- Sporting CP B

Relegated to 2025–26 Campeonato de Portugal

- Anadia
- Lusitânia
- Oliveira do Hospital
- Vilaverdense

=== Stadium and locations ===
Location of teams in 2025-26 Liga 3 (Mainland).
Yellow: Serie A;
Blue: Serie B.

| Team | Location | Stadium | Capacity | 2024–25 finish |
|---|---|---|---|---|
| Belenenses | Lisbon | Estádio do Restelo | 19,856 | 3rd Promotion |
| Braga B | Braga | Estádio Amélia Morais | 2,500 | 1st Relegation S1 |
| Académica | Coimbra | Estádio Cidade de Coimbra | 29,622 | 2nd Relegation S2 |
| Amora | Amora | Estádio da Medideira | 1,500 | 2nd CP Promotion Serie 2 |
| Varzim | Póvoa de Varzim | Estádio do Varzim Sport Club | 7,280 | 4th Promotion |
| Atlético CP | Lisbon | Estádio da Tapadinha | 4,000 | 7th Promotion |
| Sp. Covilhã | Covilhã | Estádio Municipal; José dos Santos Pinto | 3,500 | 4th Relegation S2 |
| Fafe | Fafe | Estádio Municipal de Fafe | 4,000 | 5th Promotion |
| Trofense | Trofa | Estádio do Clube Desportivo Trofense | 5,017 | 3rd Relegation S1 |
| Caldas | Caldas da Rainha | Campo da Mata | 5,700 | 3rd Relegation S2 |
| Sanjoanense | São João da Madeira | Estádio Conde Dias Garcia | 8,500 | 2nd Relegation S1 |
| USC Paredes | Paredes | Estádio Municipal das Laranjeiras | 2,612 | 2nd CP Promotion Serie 1 |
| 1.º Dezembro | Sintra | Complexo Desportivo do Real SC | 1,200 | 6th Promotion |
| Amarante | Amarante | Estádio Municipal de Amarante | 5,000 | 8th Promotion |
| Mafra | Mafra | Estádio Municipal de Mafra | 1,249 | 18th LP2 |
| São João de Ver | Santa Maria da Feira | Estádio Sporting Clube São João de Ver | 5,000 | 4th Relegation S1 |
| Marco 09 | Marco de Canaveses | Estádio Municipal do Marco de Canaveses | 6,000 | 3rd CP Promotion Serie 1 |
| Lusitano Évora | Évora | Campo Estrela | 4,000 | 1st CP Promotion Serie 2 |
| União de Santarém | Santarém | Campo Chã das Padeiras | 2,167 | 1st Relegation S2 |
| Vitória SC B | Guimarães | Academia Vitória Sport Clube | 2,500 | 1st CP Promotion Serie 1 |

== First stage ==
In the first stage, the 20 clubs will be divided in two series (Série A and B) of 10 teams, according to geographic criteria.

=== Série A ===
| Pos | Team | Pld | W | D | L | GF | GA | GD | Pts | Qualification | VIT | AMA | TRO | VAR | PAR | BRA | FAF | MAR | SJV | SAN |
|---|---|---|---|---|---|---|---|---|---|---|---|---|---|---|---|---|---|---|---|---|
| 1 | Vitória S.C. B | 18 | 8 | 5 | 5 | 20 | 16 | +4 | 29 | Qualification for Promotion Stage | | 2–3 | 1–2 | 1–2 | 1–3 | 0–0 | 1–0 | 1–0 | 2–0 | 1–0 |
| 2 | Amarante | 18 | 8 | 5 | 5 | 19 | 17 | +2 | 29 | Qualification for Promotion Stage | 1–2 | | 1–1 | 0–1 | 1–0 | 1–0 | 3–2 | 3–2 | 2–2 | 0–0 |
| 3 | Trofense | 18 | 7 | 7 | 4 | 23 | 15 | +8 | 28 | Qualification for Promotion Stage | 0–1 | 0–1 | | 2–1 | 0–0 | 2–0 | 5–1 | 0–1 | 1–1 | 1–2 |
| 4 | Varzim | 18 | 7 | 7 | 4 | 26 | 17 | +9 | 28 | Qualification for Promotion Stage | 1–1 | 0–0 | 0–1 | | 2–2 | 3–1 | 1–1 | 2–1 | 4–0 | 2–0 |
| 5 | Paredes | 18 | 6 | 9 | 3 | 22 | 12 | +10 | 27 | Qualification for Relegation Stage | 1–1 | 0–0 | 0–0 | 0–0 | | 2–0 | 1–1 | 2–0 | 0–0 | 3–0 |
| 6 | Braga B | 18 | 6 | 7 | 5 | 16 | 17 | −1 | 25 | Qualification for Relegation Stage | 0–0 | 1–0 | 0–0 | 1–0 | 1–0 | | 1–0 | 2–1 | 0–0 | 2–2 |
| 7 | Fafe | 18 | 6 | 6 | 6 | 23 | 21 | +2 | 24 | Qualification for Relegation Stage | 1–0 | 3–0 | 1–2 | 1–0 | 2–1 | 2–2 | | 0–0 | 2–0 | 0–2 |
| 8 | Marco 09 | 18 | 4 | 7 | 7 | 15 | 22 | −7 | 19 | Qualification for Relegation Stage | 0–0 | 1–0 | 1–1 | 1–3 | 0–3 | 2–2 | 1–1 | | 2–1 | 2–1 |
| 9 | São João de Ver | 18 | 2 | 8 | 8 | 11 | 26 | −15 | 14 | Qualification for Relegation Stage | 0–2 | 0–1 | 0–0 | 1–1 | 1–2 | 1–0 | 0–4 | 0–0 | | 2–1 |
| 10 | Sanjoanense | 18 | 2 | 7 | 9 | 20 | 32 | −12 | 13 | Qualification for Relegation Stage | 2–3 | 0–2 | 2–4 | 3–3 | 2–2 | 0–2 | 1–1 | 0–0 | 2–2 | |

Source: Liga 3
Legend: Blue = home team win; Yellow = draw; Red = away team win.
Rules for classification: 1) points, 2) head-to-head points, 3) head-to-head goal difference, 4) goal difference, 5) matches won, 6) goals scored

=== Série B ===
| Pos | Team | Pld | W | D | L | GF | GA | GD | Pts | Qualification | BEL | MAF | ACA | USA | ATL | LUE | AMO | CAL | 1DE | SPC |
|---|---|---|---|---|---|---|---|---|---|---|---|---|---|---|---|---|---|---|---|---|
| 1 | Belenenses | 18 | 12 | 2 | 4 | 27 | 16 | +11 | 38 | Qualification for Promotion Stage | | 2–1 | 1–1 | 0–2 | 1–0 | 1–0 | 3–1 | 0–2 | 1–0 | 3–0 |
| 2 | Mafra | 18 | 9 | 7 | 2 | 28 | 19 | +9 | 34 | Qualification for Promotion Stage | 1–1 | | 1–0 | 0–0 | 1–0 | 1–1 | 2–0 | 4–2 | 3–1 | 2–0 |
| 3 | Académica de Coimbra | 18 | 7 | 7 | 4 | 29 | 18 | +11 | 28 | Qualification for Promotion Stage | 4–1 | 3–3 | | 1–0 | 2–0 | 3–1 | 2–0 | 0–0 | 1–1 | 0–1 |
| 4 | União de Santarém | 18 | 6 | 7 | 5 | 15 | 14 | +1 | 25 | Qualification for Promotion Stage | 2–1 | 1–2 | 1–1 | | 1–1 | 1–0 | 0–0 | 0–1 | 1–0 | 1–1 |
| 5 | Atlético CP | 18 | 6 | 4 | 8 | 16 | 17 | −1 | 22 | Qualification for Relegation Stage | 1–2 | 1–2 | 1–4 | 1–2 | | 1–0 | 0–1 | 2–0 | 4–0 | 0–0 |
| 6 | Lusitano Évora | 18 | 6 | 4 | 8 | 19 | 19 | 0 | 22 | Qualification for Relegation Stage | 0–1 | 4–1 | 0–2 | 1–0 | 0–1 | | 3–1 | 1–0 | 2–0 | 2–1 |
| 7 | Amora | 18 | 5 | 6 | 7 | 19 | 22 | −3 | 21 | Qualification for Relegation Stage | 0–2 | 1–2 | 3–3 | 3–0 | 1–1 | 1–1 | | 0–1 | 1–1 | 2–0 |
| 8 | Caldas | 18 | 6 | 3 | 9 | 17 | 23 | −6 | 21 | Qualification for Relegation Stage | 1–2 | 1–1 | 1–0 | 0–2 | 0–1 | 2–1 | 1–2 | | 2–2 | 2–1 |
| 9 | 1.º Dezembro | 18 | 3 | 8 | 7 | 13 | 21 | −8 | 17 | Qualification for Relegation Stage | 0–1 | 1–1 | 2–1 | 0–0 | 0–1 | 1–1 | 0–0 | 2–0 | | 1–1 |
| 10 | Covilhã | 18 | 2 | 8 | 8 | 10 | 24 | −14 | 14 | Qualification for Relegation Stage | 0–4 | 0–0 | 1–1 | 1–1 | 0–0 | 1–1 | 0–2 | 2–1 | 0–1 | |

Source: Liga 3
Legend: Blue = home team win; Yellow = draw; Red = away team win.
Rules for classification: 1) points, 2) head-to-head points, 3) head-to-head goal difference, 4) goal difference, 5) matches won, 6) goals scored

== Second stage ==
=== Promotion stage ===
The eight qualified teams from the first stage play against each other in a home-and-away double round-robin system, with the winners and runners-up being promoted to Liga Portugal 2 and the third-placed team qualifying for a playoff against the 16th-placed team of Liga Portugal 2.

| Pos | Team | Pld | W | D | L | GF | GA | GD | Pts | Promotion or qualification | AMA | ACA | BEL | MAF | VIT | VAR | USA | TRO |
|---|---|---|---|---|---|---|---|---|---|---|---|---|---|---|---|---|---|---|
| 1 | Amarante (C, P) | 14 | 9 | 4 | 1 | 22 | 11 | +11 | 31 | Promotion to Liga Portugal 2 | | 1–1 | 2–2 | 1–0 | 2–1 | 1–0 | 1–0 | 1–0 |
| 2 | Académica de Coimbra (P) | 14 | 8 | 4 | 2 | 23 | 13 | +10 | 28 | Promotion to Liga Portugal 2 | 1–1 | | 2–1 | 2–0 | 1–0 | 1–0 | 3–1 | 3–0 |
| 3 | Belenenses | 14 | 7 | 5 | 2 | 25 | 16 | +9 | 26 | Qualification for the Promotion play-off | 1–2 | 3–2 | | 3–1 | 0–0 | 3–2 | 1–1 | 0–0 |
| 4 | Mafra | 14 | 5 | 2 | 7 | 17 | 24 | −7 | 17 | | 1–4 | 3–3 | 1–4 | | 1–2 | 1–0 | 2–1 | 1–0 |
| 5 | Vitória S.C. B | 14 | 4 | 5 | 5 | 16 | 17 | −1 | 17 | | 1–3 | 1–0 | 2–2 | 0–2 | | 3–0 | 1–1 | 1–2 |
| 6 | Varzim | 14 | 4 | 2 | 8 | 13 | 19 | −6 | 14 | | 2–1 | 0–1 | 1–2 | 0–2 | 2–2 | | 1–0 | 2–0 |
| 7 | União de Santarém | 14 | 2 | 4 | 8 | 13 | 20 | −7 | 10 | | 1–2 | 1–1 | 0–2 | 3–1 | 0–1 | 2–2 | | 0–1 |
| 8 | Trofense | 14 | 2 | 4 | 8 | 7 | 16 | −9 | 10 | | 0–0 | 1–2 | 0–1 | 1–1 | 1–1 | 0–1 | 1–2 | |

Source: Liga 3
Legend: Blue = home team win; Yellow = draw; Red = away team win.
Rules for classification: 1) points, 2) head-to-head points, 3) head-to-head goal difference, 4) goal difference, 5) matches won, 6) goals scored
(C) Champions; (P) Promoted

=== Relegation stage ===
The bottom 12 teams were divided in two series of 6 teams, playing against each other in a home-and-away double round-robin system and the bottom two teams of each series being relegated to Campeonato de Portugal. To account for their performance in the first stage, teams started with bonification points, as follows:

- The best-5th-placed team (Paredes) started with 9 points.
- The worst 5th-placed team (Atlético CP) and best 6th-placed team (Braga B) started with 8 points.
- The worst 6th-placed team (Lusitano Évora) started with 7 points.
- The 7th-placed teams (Amora and Fafe) started with 6 points.
- The best 8th-placed team (Caldas) started with 5 points.
- The worst 8th-placed team (Marco 09) started with 4 points.
- The best 9th-placed team (1.º Dezembro) started with 3 points.
- The worst 9th-placed team (São João de Ver) started with 2 points.
- The 10th-placed teams (Covilhã and Sanjoanense) started with 1 point.

==== Serie 1 ====
| Pos | Team | Pld | W | D | L | GF | GA | GD | Pts | Relegation | SJV | FAF | PAR | MAR | BRA | SAN |
|---|---|---|---|---|---|---|---|---|---|---|---|---|---|---|---|---|
| 1 | São João de Ver | 10 | 5 | 4 | 1 | 12 | 7 | +5 | 21 | | | 1–0 | 3–1 | 0–0 | 1–1 | 2–1 |
| 2 | Fafe | 10 | 4 | 3 | 3 | 11 | 10 | +1 | 21 | | 1–2 | | 1–0 | 1–1 | 2–1 | 3–2 |
| 3 | Paredes | 10 | 3 | 3 | 4 | 12 | 10 | +2 | 21 | | 0–0 | 0–0 | | 2–2 | 4–1 | 3–1 |
| 4 | Marco 09 | 10 | 3 | 5 | 2 | 8 | 9 | −1 | 18 | | 2–1 | 1–0 | 0–2 | | 1–0 | 0–0 |
| 5 | Braga B (R) | 10 | 2 | 3 | 5 | 9 | 13 | −4 | 17 | Relegation to Campeonato de Portugal | 0–1 | 0–0 | 1–0 | 2–0 | | 1–2 |
| 6 | Sanjoanense (R) | 10 | 2 | 4 | 4 | 13 | 16 | −3 | 11 | Relegation to Campeonato de Portugal | 1–1 | 2–3 | 1–0 | 1–1 | 2–2 | |

Source: Liga 3
Legend: Blue = home team win; Yellow = draw; Red = away team win.
Rules for classification: 1) points, 2) head-to-head points, 3) head-to-head goal difference, 4) goal difference, 5) matches won, 6) goals scored
(R) Relegated

==== Serie 2 ====
| Pos | Team | Pld | W | D | L | GF | GA | GD | Pts | Relegation | ATL | LUE | CAL | SPC | 1DE | AMO |
|---|---|---|---|---|---|---|---|---|---|---|---|---|---|---|---|---|
| 1 | Atlético CP | 10 | 6 | 0 | 4 | 16 | 8 | +8 | 26 | | | 3–0 | 2–0 | 1–2 | 0–1 | 1–2 |
| 2 | Lusitano Évora | 10 | 5 | 2 | 3 | 11 | 10 | +1 | 24 | | 0–1 | | 0–1 | 1–0 | 2–1 | 1–0 |
| 3 | Caldas | 10 | 4 | 2 | 4 | 10 | 11 | −1 | 19 | | 0–1 | 1–1 | | 1–1 | 2–1 | 2–1 |
| 4 | Covilhã | 10 | 5 | 2 | 3 | 13 | 11 | +2 | 18 | | 2–1 | 1–3 | 1–0 | | 0–2 | 1–1 |
| 5 | 1.º Dezembro (R) | 10 | 4 | 1 | 5 | 14 | 14 | 0 | 16 | Relegation to Campeonato de Portugal | 1–5 | 1–1 | 2–1 | 1–2 | | 0–1 |
| 6 | Amora (R) | 10 | 2 | 1 | 7 | 7 | 17 | −10 | 13 | Relegation to Campeonato de Portugal | 0–1 | 1–2 | 1–2 | 0–3 | 0–4 | |

Source: Liga 3
Legend: Blue = home team win; Yellow = draw; Red = away team win.
Rules for classification: 1) points, 2) head-to-head points, 3) head-to-head goal difference, 4) goal difference, 5) matches won, 6) goals scored
(R) Relegated
