= 2026–27 Liga 3 (Portugal) =

3rd season of the Liga 3 (Portugal)

Liga 3
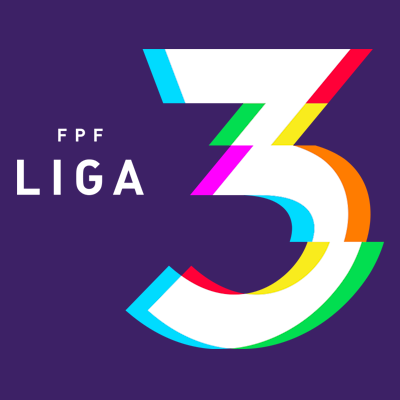
- Season: 2025–26
- Dates: August 2026 – May 2027

The 2026–27 Liga 3 is the sixth season of Portuguese football's third-tier league, and the 80th season of recognised third-tier football in Portugal.

== Format ==
This competition consists of a first stage with all the teams then proceed to a promotion or relegation series depending on their performance.

== Teams ==
A total of 20 teams will contest the league, including 2 teams relegated from the 2025–26 Liga Portugal 2, 14 teams from the 2025–26 Liga 3 and 4 teams promoted from the 2025–26 Campeonato de Portugal.

=== Changes ===
The following teams changed division since the 2025–26 season.

To Liga 3
▼ Relegated from Liga Portugal 2
- Paços de Ferreira
- Oliveirense
▲ Promoted from Campeonato de Portugal
- Leça
- Vitória de Sernache
- Vianense
- Louletano

From Liga 3
▲ Promoted to Liga Portugal 2
- Amarante
- Académica
▼ Relegated to Campeonato de Portugal
- 1.º Dezembro
- Amora
- Braga B
- Sanjoanense

=== Stadium and locations ===
Location of teams in 2026-27 Liga 3.
Red: Serie A;
Green: Serie B.

==== Serie A ====
Team	Location	Stadium	Capacity	2025–26 finish
Fafe	Fafe	Estádio Municipal de Fafe	4,000	2nd Relegation S1
Leça^{↑}	Leça da Palmeira	Estádio do Leça FC	4,529	1st CP Promotion S1
Marco 09	Marco de Canaveses	Estádio Municipal do Marco de Canaveses	6,000	4th Relegation S1
Paços de Ferreira^{↓}	Paços de Ferreira	Estádio Capital do Móvel	9,076	18th LP2
Paredes	Paredes	Estádio Municipal das Laranjeiras	2,612	3rd Relegation S1
São João de Ver	Santa Maria da Feira	Estádio Sporting Clube São João de Ver	5,000	1st Relegation S1
Trofense	Trofa	Estádio do Clube Desportivo Trofense	5,017	8th Promotion
Varzim	Póvoa de Varzim	Estádio do Varzim Sport Club	7,280	6th Promotion
Vianense^{↑}	Viana do Castelo	Estádio Dr. José de Matos	3,000	2nd CP Promotion S1
Vitória SC B	Guimarães	Academia Vitória Sport Clube	2,500	5th Promotion

==== Serie B ====
Team	Location	Stadium	Capacity	2025–26 finish
Atlético CP	Lisbon	Estádio da Tapadinha	4,000	1st Relegation S2
Belenenses	Lisbon	Estádio do Restelo	19,856	3rd Promotion
Caldas	Caldas da Rainha	Campo da Mata	5,700	3rd Relegation S2
Louletano^{↑}	Loulé	Estádio Algarve	22,000	2nd CP Promotion S2
Lusitano Évora	Évora	Campo Estrela	4,000	2nd Relegation S2
Mafra	Mafra	Estádio Municipal de Mafra	1,249	4th Promotion
Oliveirense^{↓}	Oliveira de Azeméis	Estádio Carlos Osório	1,750	18th LP2
Sp. Covilhã	Covilhã	Estádio Municipal; José dos Santos Pinto	3,500	4th Relegation S2
União de Santarém	Santarém	Campo Chã das Padeiras	2,167	7th Promotion
Vitória Sernache^{↑}	Cernache do Bonjardim	Estádio Municipal D. Nuno Álvares Pereira	2,500	1st CP Promotion S2

== First stage ==
In the first stage, the 20 clubs will be divided in two series (Serie A and B) of 10 teams, according to geographic criteria.

=== Serie A ===
==== League table ====
Pos	Team	Pld	W	D	L	GF	GA	GD	Pts	Qualification
1	Paredes	9	7	1	1	20	9	+11	22	Qualification for the Promotion Stage
2	Leça	9	4	2	3	11	9	+2	14	Qualification for the Promotion Stage
3	Marco 09	9	4	2	3	9	8	+1	14	Qualification for the Promotion Stage
4	Fafe	9	3	4	2	13	9	+4	13	Qualification for the Promotion Stage
5	Vitória S.C. B	9	3	3	3	12	10	+2	12	Qualification for the Relegation Stage
6	Varzim	9	4	0	5	13	13	0	12	Qualification for the Relegation Stage
7	Vianense	9	2	5	2	12	13	−1	11	Qualification for the Relegation Stage
8	Paços de Ferreira	9	3	2	4	12	16	−4	11	Qualification for the Relegation Stage
9	São João de Ver	9	2	3	4	9	12	−3	9	Qualification for the Relegation Stage
10	Trofense	9	1	2	6	7	19	−12	5	Qualification for the Relegation Stage

Updated to match(es) played on 8 November 2026. Source: Liga 3
Rules for classification: 1) Points; 2) Head-to-head points; 3) Head-to-head goal difference; 4) Goal difference; 5) Matches won; 6) Goals scored; 7) Play-off.

==== Results ====
Home \ Away	FAF	LEC	MAR	PAC	PAR	SJV	TRO	VAR	VIA	VSC
Fafe				3–1			2–2		0–0	1–1
Leça	0–3		2–0			1–1		2–0		
Marco 09	0–0			2–1	1–3				2–0	1–0
Paços de Ferreira		1–0			0–1	1–1	4–3	1–4		
Paredes	2–1	1–2				2–1	4–0			3–1
São João de Ver	1–3		0–0					2–1		0–2
Trofense		1–4	0–2			1–0		0–1		
Varzim	2–0		2–1		0–1				1–2	2–4
Vianense		0–0		2–2	3–3	1–3	2–0			
Vitória S.C. B		2–0		0–1			0–0		2–2	

Updated to match(es) played on 8 November 2026. Source: Liga 3
Legend: Blue = home team win; Yellow = draw; Red = away team win.

=== Serie B ===
==== League table ====
Pos	Team	Pld	W	D	L	GF	GA	GD	Pts	Qualification
1	Belenenses	9	6	3	0	18	6	+12	21	Qualification for the Promotion Stage
2	Atlético CP	9	6	2	1	18	7	+11	20	Qualification for the Promotion Stage
3	Oliveirense	9	3	4	2	11	11	0	13	Qualification for the Promotion Stage
4	União de Santarém	9	4	1	4	11	15	−4	13	Qualification for the Promotion Stage
5	Mafra	9	3	3	3	17	13	+4	12	Qualification for the Relegation Stage
6	Louletano	9	3	2	4	12	12	0	11	Qualification for the Relegation Stage
7	Caldas	9	3	2	4	10	13	−3	11	Qualification for the Relegation Stage
8	Vitória de Sernache	9	2	1	6	6	16	−10	7	Qualification for the Relegation Stage
9	Sp. Covilhã	9	1	4	4	5	10	−5	7	Qualification for the Relegation Stage
10	Lusitano Évora	9	1	4	4	6	11	−5	7	Qualification for the Relegation Stage

Updated to match(es) played on 8 November 2026. Source: Liga 3
Rules for classification: 1) Points; 2) Head-to-head points; 3) Head-to-head goal difference; 4) Goal difference; 5) Matches won; 6) Goals scored; 7) Play-off.

==== Results ====
Home \ Away	ATL	BEL	CAL	LOU	LUS	MAF	OLI	SPC	UDS	VDS
Atlético CP			4–1			1–1	3–1		3–1	
Belenenses	1–0		1–0		0–0			1–1	5–0	
Caldas				2–4	0–0	3–3	0–1			2–0
Louletano	2–2	1–3			1–0			2–0	1–2	
Lusitano Évora	0–1					2–1	2–2	2–2		0–1
Mafra		2–2		2–1				1–0		5–0
Oliveirense		1–2		0–0		2–1				3–2
Sp. Covilhã	0–3		0–1				0–0		2–0	
União de Santarém			0–1		3–0	2–1	1–1			2–1
Vitória de Sernache	0–1	1–3		1–0				0–0		

Updated to match(es) played on 8 November 2026. Source: Liga 3
Legend: Blue = home team win; Yellow = draw; Red = away team win.

== See also ==
- 2026–27 Primeira Liga
- 2026–27 Liga Portugal 2
- 2026–27 Campeonato de Portugal
- 2026–27 Taça da Liga
- 2026–27 Taça de Portugal
