= List of Amarante F.C. seasons =

Portuguese association football club

Amarante Futebol Clube is a Portuguese association football club based in Amarante, founded in 1923. The club affiliated with the Porto Football Association in 1934 and competed in regional leagues before first reaching the national divisions in 1965–66. After returning to regional football, Amarante re-entered the national leagues in 1977–78 and won promotion to the Segunda Divisão, then the second tier of Portuguese football, in 1979. The club spent five seasons at that level between 1979 and 1989, before a restructuring of the national leagues placed it in the third-tier Segunda Divisão B in 1990. During the 1990s and early 2000s, Amarante experienced repeated movement between the national divisions and the Porto district leagues.

Amarante returned to the national divisions in 2006 and won the Terceira Divisão in the 2007–08 and 2010–11 seasons. Following further restructuring of Portuguese football, the club competed in the third-tier Campeonato de Portugal from 2013, before the introduction of Liga 3 in 2021 made it the fourth tier. Amarante won the 2023–24 Campeonato de Portugal title and secured promotion to Liga 3, before winning the 2025–26 Liga 3 championship to earn promotion to Liga Portugal 2, the second tier, for the 2026–27 season. The club has also reached the round of 16 of the Taça de Portugal twice, in 2015–16 and 2023–24.

== Seasons ==
Table correct as of 8 November 2026. (Note: Attributed to multiple references:)

Champions	Runners-up	Division winners	Division runners-up	Promoted	Relegated	Current season

Season	League										Cup	League Cup	Super Cup	Notes
Season	Division	Tier	Pos.	Pld	W	D	L	GF	GA	Pts	Result	Result	Result	Notes
1934–35	Porto Championship – Second Division	4									DNP	n/a	n/a	
1935–36	Porto Championship – Second Division	4									DNP	n/a	n/a	
1936–37	Porto Championship – Second Division	4									DNP	n/a	n/a	
1937–38	Porto Championship – Second Division	4									DNP	n/a	n/a	
1938–39	No information available.													
1939–40	Porto Championship – Third Division	5									DNP	n/a	n/a	
1940–41	Porto Championship – Third Division	5									DNP	n/a	n/a	
1941–42	Porto Championship – Third Division	5									DNP	n/a	n/a	
No information available.
1944–45	Porto Championship – Promotion Series	6									DNP	n/a	n/a	
1945–46	Porto Championship – Promotion Series	6									DNP	n/a	n/a	
1946–47	Porto Championship – Promotion Series	6									DNP	n/a	n/a	
1947–48	AF Porto – Promotion Series	6	2nd	4	2	1	1	13	11	9	DNP	n/a	n/a	
1948–49	AF Porto – 3ª Divisão	6									DNP	n/a	n/a	
1949–50	AF Porto – 3ª Divisão	6	1st	6	5	1	0	17	8	17	DNP	n/a	n/a	
1949–50	AF Porto – 3ª Divisão	6	2R	2	0	1	1	4	6	-	DNP	n/a	n/a	Promotion playoff
1950–51	AF Porto – 3ª Divisão	6	1st	12	9	2	1	37	15	32	DNP	n/a	n/a	
1950–51	AF Porto – 3ª Divisão	6	1R	2	0	0	2	2	10	-	DNP	n/a	n/a	Promotion playoff
1951–52	AF Porto – 3ª Divisão	6									DNP	n/a	n/a	
1952–53	AF Porto – 3ª Divisão ↑	6	2nd	18	12	4	2	49	18	46	DNP	n/a	n/a	
1952–53	AF Porto – 3ª Divisão ↑	6	W								DNP	n/a	n/a	Promotion playoff
1953–54	AF Porto – 2ª Divisão	5	8th	30	11	8	11	59	49	60	DNP	n/a	n/a	
1954–55	AF Porto – 2ª Divisão	5	5th	30	16	3	11	67	54	35	DNP	n/a	n/a	
1955–56	AF Porto – 2ª Divisão	5	2nd	18	10	4	4	44	21	24	DNP	n/a	n/a	
1955–56	AF Porto – 2ª Divisão	5									DNP	n/a	n/a	Promotion stage
1956–57	AF Porto – 2ª Divisão	5									DNP	n/a	n/a	
1956–57	AF Porto – 2ª Divisão	5									DNP	n/a	n/a	Promotion stage
1957–58	AF Porto – 2ª Divisão	5									DNP	n/a	n/a	
1958–59	AF Porto – 2ª Divisão	5									DNP	n/a	n/a	
1959–60	AF Porto – 2ª Divisão	5									DNP	n/a	n/a	
1960–61	AF Porto – 2ª Divisão	5									DNP	n/a	n/a	
1961–62	AF Porto – 2ª Divisão	5									DNP	n/a	n/a	
1962–63	AF Porto – 2ª Divisão	5									DNP	n/a	n/a	
1963–64	AF Porto – 2ª Divisão ↑	5	1st								DNP	n/a	n/a	
1964–65	AF Porto – 1ª Divisão	4	6th	26	10	5	11	36	39	25	DNP	n/a	n/a	
1965–66	AF Porto – 1ª Divisão ↑	4	2nd	26	14	6	6	53	34	34	DNP	n/a	n/a	Qualified to Terceira Divisão
1965–66	Terceira Divisão ↓	3	1st	10	7	2	1	29	10	16	DNP	n/a	n/a	Qualified to Playoffs
1965–66	Terceira Divisão ↓	3	QF	2	0	0	2	0	3	-	DNP	n/a	n/a	Demoted to Regional
1966–67	AF Porto – 1ª Divisão	4	8th	26	10	6	10	40	32	26	DNP	n/a	n/a	
1967–68	AF Porto – 1ª Divisão	4	7th	26	14	0	2	44	41	28	DNP	n/a	n/a	
1968–69	AF Porto – 1ª Divisão	4	7th	34	14	9	11	50	46	37	DNP	n/a	n/a	
1969–70	AF Porto – 1ª Divisão	4	10th	32	13	7	12	62	51	33	DNP	n/a	n/a	
1970–71	AF Porto – 1ª Divisão	4	16th	34	9	8	17	50	61	26	DNP	n/a	n/a	
1970–71	AF Porto – 1ª Divisão	4	W	1	1	0	0	5	0	-	DNP	n/a	n/a	Relegation playoff
1971–72	AF Porto – 1ª Divisão	4	3rd	32	17	8	7	63	41	42	DNP	n/a	n/a	
1972–73	AF Porto – 1ª Divisão	4	4th	32	15	6	11	53	39	36	DNP	n/a	n/a	
1973–74	AF Porto – 1ª Divisão	4	3rd	32	18	7	7	66	41	43	DNP	n/a	n/a	
1974–75	AF Porto – 1ª Divisão	4	2nd	32	19	3	10	51	31	41	DNP	n/a	n/a	
1975–76	AF Porto – 1ª Divisão	4	4th	36	15	10	11	55	32	40	DNP	n/a	n/a	
1976–77	AF Porto – 1ª Divisão ↑	4	1st	32	18	10	4	60	23	46	DNP	n/a	n/a	
1977–78	Terceira Divisão	3	7th	30	12	6	12	41	39	30	3R	n/a	n/a	
1978–79	Terceira Divisão ↑	3	2nd	30	19	6	5	52	20	44	1R	n/a	DNP	
1979–80	Segunda Divisão	2	12th	30	13	3	14	29	40	29	2R	n/a	DNP	
1980–81	Segunda Divisão	2	11th	30	10	9	11	31	35	29	1R	n/a	DNP	
1981–82	Segunda Divisão ↓	2	15th	30	4	6	20	23	60	14	3R	n/a	DNP	
1982–83	Terceira Divisão	3	12th	30	9	10	11	28	33	28	2R	n/a	DNP	
1983–84	Terceira Divisão	3	9th	30	10	10	10	35	30	30	1R	n/a	DNP	
1984–85	Terceira Divisão ↑	3	1st	30	18	6	6	55	17	42	4R	n/a	DNP	
1984–85	Terceira Divisão ↑	3	3rd	4	1	1	2	4	5	3	4R	n/a	DNP	2nd Phase - Zone 1
1985–86	Segunda Divisão ↓	2	15th	30	4	8	18	27	56	16	4R	n/a	DNP	
1986–87	Terceira Divisão	3	7th	30	12	8	10	51	48	32	1R	n/a	DNP	
1987–88	Terceira Divisão ↑	3	2nd	38	23	8	7	55	26	54	4R	n/a	DNP	
1988–89	Segunda Divisão ↓	2	17th	34	4	9	21	26	63	17	2R	n/a	DNP	
1989–90	Terceira Divisão	3	5th	34	14	13	7	46	34	41	1R	n/a	DNP	
1990–91	Segunda Divisão B ↓	3	14th	38	15	8	15	51	50	38	3R	n/a	DNP	
1991–92	Terceira Divisão	4	4th	34	16	6	12	44	31	38	3R	n/a	DNP	
1992–93	Terceira Divisão	4	5th	34	18	6	10	54	40	42	4R	n/a	DNP	
1993–94	Terceira Divisão ↑	4	2nd	34	22	5	7	68	39	49	2R	n/a	DNP	
1994–95	Segunda Divisão B	3	13th	34	10	10	14	31	41	30	2R	n/a	DNP	
1995–96	Segunda Divisão B ↓	3	15th	34	10	10	14	42	51	40	3R	n/a	DNP	
1996–97	Terceira Divisão ↓	4	17th	34	8	9	17	45	56	33	2R	n/a	DNP	
1997–98	AF Porto – Divisão Honra ↑	5	2nd	34	21	7	6	71	25	70	DNP	n/a	DNP	
1998–99	Terceira Divisão	4	13th	34	11	8	15	45	45	41	2R	n/a	DNP	
1999–2000	Terceira Divisão	4	14th	34	10	7	17	33	53	37	1R	n/a	DNP	
2000–01	Terceira Divisão	4	11th	34	12	9	13	44	47	45	1R	n/a	DNP	
2001–02	Terceira Divisão ↓	4	14th	32	9	9	14	41	61	36	2R	n/a	DNP	
2002–03	AF Porto – Divisão Honra	5	10th	38	16	3	19	51	53	51	DNP	n/a	DNP	
2003–04	AF Porto – Divisão Honra	5	3rd	34	16	9	9	50	35	57	DNP	n/a	DNP	
2004–05	AF Porto – Divisão Honra	5	3rd	34	21	5	8	61	42	68	2R	n/a	DNP	
2005–06	AF Porto – Divisão Honra ↑	5	1st	34	22	8	4	70	21	74	1R	n/a	DNP	
2006–07	Terceira Divisão	4	9th	30	11	7	12	41	42	40	1R	n/a	DNP	
2007–08	Terceira Divisão ↑	4	2nd	26	15	5	6	43	26	50	3R	DNP	DNP	
2007–08	Terceira Divisão ↑	4	1st	10	8	1	1	27	12	50	3R	DNP	DNP	Promotion stage
2008–09	Segunda Divisão ↓	3	9th	22	6	5	11	24	41	23	1R	DNP	DNP	
2008–09	Segunda Divisão ↓	3	5th	10	3	3	4	12	11	24	1R	DNP	DNP	Relegation stage
2009–10	Terceira Divisão	4	2nd	22	9	9	4	29	23	36	1R	DNP	DNP	
2009–10	Terceira Divisão	4	6th	10	2	0	8	8	17	24	1R	DNP	DNP	Promotion stage
2010–11	Terceira Divisão ↑	4	2nd	22	13	5	4	30	15	44	2R	DNP	DNP	
2010–11	Terceira Divisão ↑	4	1st	10	5	2	3	11	8	39	2R	DNP	DNP	Promotion stage
2011–12	Segunda Divisão	3	5th	30	13	10	7	48	30	49	2R	DNP	DNP	
2012–13	Segunda Divisão	3	11th	30	7	12	11	30	33	33	2R	DNP	DNP	
2013–14	Campeonato Nacional de Seniores	3	4th	18	7	6	5	29	21	27	1R	DNP	DNP	
2013–14	Campeonato Nacional de Seniores	3	3rd	14	6	3	5	19	15	35	1R	DNP	DNP	Relegation stage
2014–15	Campeonato Nacional de Seniores	3	6th	18	5	5	8	19	25	20	1R	DNP	DNP	
2014–15	Campeonato Nacional de Seniores	3	4th	14	6	3	5	24	24	31	1R	DNP	DNP	Relegation stage
2015–16	Campeonato de Portugal	3	6th	18	5	6	7	23	24	21	L16	DNP	DNP	
2015–16	Campeonato de Portugal	3	4th	14	5	6	3	14	11	32	L16	DNP	DNP	Relegation stage
2016–17	Campeonato de Portugal	3	1st	18	12	5	1	33	9	41	3R	DNP	DNP	
2016–17	Campeonato de Portugal	3	6th	14	4	5	5	18	17	17	3R	DNP	DNP	Promotion stage
2017–18	Campeonato de Portugal	3	6th	30	12	9	9	42	33	45	3R	DNP	DNP	
2018–19	Campeonato de Portugal	3	7th	34	15	9	10	45	28	54	3R	DNP	DNP	
2019–20	Campeonato de Portugal	3	10th	25	8	9	8	31	29	33	2R	DNP	DNP	Season was cancelled due to COVID-19
2020–21	Campeonato de Portugal ↓	3	5th	18	7	3	8	15	17	24	1R	DNP	DNP	
2020–21	Campeonato de Portugal ↓	3	4th	6	1	2	3	4	7	5	1R	DNP	DNP	Liga 3 Qualification Series
2021–22	Campeonato de Portugal	4	5th	18	8	6	4	33	21	30	1R	DNP	DNP	
2021–22	Campeonato de Portugal	4	1st	6	4	1	1	15	5	13	1R	DNP	DNP	Relegation stage
2022–23	Campeonato de Portugal	4	2nd	26	14	9	3	43	25	51	1R	DNP	DNP	
2022–23	Campeonato de Portugal	4	3rd	6	1	3	2	2	4	6	1R	DNP	DNP	Promotion stage
2023–24	Campeonato de Portugal ↑	4	1st	26	17	8	1	40	15	59	L16	DNP	DNP	
2023–24	Campeonato de Portugal ↑	4	1st	6	4	1	1	9	4	13	L16	DNP	DNP	Promotion stage
2023–24	Campeonato de Portugal ↑	4	W	1	1	0	0	3	0	-	L16	DNP	DNP	Championship final
2024–25	Liga 3	3	4th	18	9	3	6	16	11	30	4R	DNP	DNP	
2024–25	Liga 3	3	7th	14	3	4	7	14	18	13	4R	DNP	DNP	Promotion stage
2025–26	Liga 3 ↑	3	2nd	18	8	5	5	19	17	29	3R	DNP	DNP	
2025–26	Liga 3 ↑	3	1st	14	9	4	1	22	11	31	3R	DNP	DNP	Promotion stage
2026–27	Liga Portugal 2	2	14th	10	2	3	5	9	13	9	3R	DNP	DNP	

=== Overall ===
- Seasons spent at Level 2 of the football league system: 6
- Seasons spent at Level 3 of the football league system: 25
- Seasons spent at Level 4 of the football league system: 32 (including 17 at regional divisions)
- Seasons spent at Level 5 of the football league system: 19 (all regional divisions)
- Seasons spent at Level 6 of the football league system: 9 (all regional divisions)
