= 2025–26 Campeonato de Portugal =

13th season of the Campeonato de Portugal football league

Campeonato de Portugal
- Season: 2025–26
- Dates: 10 August 2025 – 7 June 2026
- Top goalscorer: Ivo Nabais (8 goals)

The 2025–26 Campeonato de Portugal is the thirteenth season of Portuguese football's renovated fourth-tier league, since the merging of the Segunda Divisão and Terceira Divisão in 2013, and the tenth season under the current Campeonato de Portugal title. After the creation of Liga 3, the new third-tier league in 2021, this is the fifth season of Campeonato Portugal as the fourth-tier league in Portuguese football league system, the 28th overall at that level.

This edition is contested by 56 clubs: 4 clubs relegated from 2024–25 Liga 3, 24 clubs promoted by 2024–25 District Championships and 28 clubs from the 2024–25 Campeonato de Portugal.

== Group stage ==
=== Serie A ===
Pos	Team	Pld	W	D	L	GF	GA	GD	Pts	Qualification or relegation
1	Bragança	26	14	6	6	41	29	+12	48	Qualification to Promotion play-offs
2	Vianense	26	14	6	6	49	28	+21	48	Qualification to Promotion play-offs
3	Brito	26	14	4	8	36	24	+12	46	
4	Celoricense	26	11	9	6	35	23	+12	42	
5	Limianos	26	11	8	7	35	32	+3	41	
6	Tirsense	26	9	13	4	31	22	+9	40	
7	Camacha	26	9	9	8	34	26	+8	36	
8	Chaves B	26	9	9	8	40	29	+11	36	
9	Machico	26	10	6	10	28	30	−2	36	
10	Martinho (R)	26	10	4	12	22	31	−9	34	Relegation to District Championship
11	Mirandela (R)	26	10	2	14	21	29	−8	32	Relegation to District Championship
12	Vilaverdense (R)	26	4	10	12	16	29	−13	22	Relegation to District Championship
13	Ribeira Brava (R)	26	4	8	14	20	46	−26	20	Relegation to District Championship
14	Monção (R)	26	3	6	17	24	54	−30	15	Relegation to District Championship

Source: FPF.pt
Rules for classification: 1) Points, 2) Head-to-head points, 3) Head-to-head goal difference, 4) Goal difference, 5) Matches won, 6) Goals scored
(R) Relegated

=== Serie B ===
Pos	Team	Pld	W	D	L	GF	GA	GD	Pts	Qualification or relegation
1	Rebordosa	26	17	7	2	41	17	+24	58	Qualification to Promotion play-offs
2	Leça	26	14	9	3	50	23	+27	51	Qualification to Promotion play-offs
3	Cinfães	26	10	10	6	33	21	+12	40	
4	Beira-Mar	26	10	8	8	30	22	+8	38	
5	Alpendorada	26	9	11	6	30	22	+8	38	
6	Florgrade	26	9	10	7	28	28	0	37	
7	Vila Meã	26	7	13	6	29	28	+1	34	
8	União de Lamas	26	9	6	11	27	33	−6	33	
9	Salgueiros	26	7	11	8	20	19	+1	32	
10	Anadia (R)	26	7	9	10	27	33	−6	30	Relegation to District Championship
11	Aparecida (R)	26	9	4	13	36	51	−15	28 (Note: In March 2026, Aparecida was penalized with a 3-point deduction by the Portuguese Football Federation’s Discipline Council for failing to complete their match against Florgrade on December 14, 2025.)	Relegation to District Championship
12	Resende (R)	26	6	10	10	27	31	−4	28	Relegation to District Championship
13	Vila Real (R)	26	5	12	9	23	30	−7	27	Relegation to District Championship
14	Gouveia (R)	26	1	4	21	14	57	−43	7	Relegation to District Championship

Source: FPF.pt
Rules for classification: 1) Points, 2) Head-to-head points, 3) Head-to-head goal difference, 4) Goal difference, 5) Matches won, 6) Goals scored
(R) Relegated

=== Serie C ===
Pos	Team	Pld	W	D	L	GF	GA	GD	Pts	Qualification or relegation
1	Vitória de Sernache	26	16	7	3	33	12	+21	55	Qualification to Promotion play-offs
2	Oliveira do Hospital	26	14	8	4	39	13	+26	50	Qualification to Promotion play-offs
3	Naval 1893	26	14	6	6	36	23	+13	48	
4	Benfica Castelo Branco	26	14	4	8	43	26	+17	46	
5	Serra	26	12	8	6	38	27	+11	44	
6	Mortágua	26	11	6	9	23	26	−3	39	
7	Marialvas	26	10	6	10	33	28	+5	36	
8	Fátima	26	8	8	10	27	29	−2	32	
9	Lajense	26	8	8	10	37	37	0	32	
10	Peniche (R)	26	8	6	12	34	43	−9	30	Relegation to District Championship
11	Samora Correia (R)	26	8	5	13	27	35	−8	29	Relegation to District Championship
12	Marinhense (R)	26	5	9	12	20	38	−18	24	Relegation to District Championship
13	Eléctrico (R)	26	5	4	17	33	62	−29	19	Relegation to District Championship
14	S.C. Lusitânia (R)	26	4	5	17	24	48	−24	17	Relegation to District Championship

Source: FPF.pt
Rules for classification: 1) Points, 2) Head-to-head points, 3) Head-to-head goal difference, 4) Goal difference, 5) Matches won, 6) Goals scored
(R) Relegated

=== Serie D ===
Pos	Team	Pld	W	D	L	GF	GA	GD	Pts	Qualification or relegation
1	Louletano	26	14	8	4	36	15	+21	50	Qualification to Promotion play-offs
2	Malveira	26	13	8	5	38	23	+15	47	Qualification to Promotion play-offs
3	Alverca B	26	14	5	7	49	32	+17	47	
4	Juventude	26	12	10	4	36	23	+13	46	
5	Alcochetense	26	11	8	7	33	22	+11	41	
6	Sintrense	26	11	7	8	30	25	+5	40	
7	Lagoa	26	11	6	9	44	34	+10	39	
8	O Elvas	26	9	7	10	33	29	+4	34	
9	Serpa	26	9	7	10	28	34	−6	34	
10	Oriental de Lisboa (R)	26	7	11	8	29	35	−6	32	Relegation to District Championship
11	Moncarapachense (R)	26	7	10	9	21	21	0	31	Relegation to District Championship
12	Portimonense B (R)	26	6	4	16	19	42	−23	22	Relegation to District Championship
13	Comércio e Indústria (R)	26	2	8	16	20	45	−25	14	Relegation to District Championship
14	Vasco da Gama (R)	26	1	11	14	20	56	−36	14	Relegation to District Championship

Source: FPF.pt
Rules for classification: 1) Points, 2) Head-to-head points, 3) Head-to-head goal difference, 4) Goal difference, 5) Matches won, 6) Goals scored
(R) Relegated

== Promotion play-offs ==
The top two placing teams in each series are entered into a play-off competition of two groups of four teams. Each group plays a double round-robin and the top two teams in each group are automatically promoted to Liga 3. The top team in each series will compete in a championship final at Estádio Nacional.

=== Serie 1 ===
Pos	Team	Pld	W	D	L	GF	GA	GD	Pts	Qualification	LEC	VIA	BRA	REB
1	Leça (P)	6	4	1	1	12	8	+4	13	Promotion to Liga 3		4–2	1–0	1–0
2	Vianense (P)	6	3	0	3	11	9	+2	9	Promotion to Liga 3	3–4		1–0	2–0
3	Bragança	6	2	2	2	5	5	0	8		1–1	1–0		2–1
4	Rebordosa	6	1	1	4	4	10	−6	4		2–1	0–3	1–1	

Updated to match(es) played on unknown. Source: fpf.pt
Rules for classification: 1) points, 2) head-to-head points, 3) head-to-head goal difference, 4) goal difference, 5) matches won, 6) goals scored
(P) Promoted

=== Serie 2 ===
Pos	Team	Pld	W	D	L	GF	GA	GD	Pts	Qualification	VTS	LOU	OLI	MLV
1	Vitória de Sernache (P)	6	3	3	0	8	3	+5	12	Promotion to Liga 3		1–1	0–0	0–0
2	Louletano (P)	6	2	3	1	8	7	+1	9	Promotion to Liga 3	1–2		2–1	1–1
3	Oliveira do Hospital	6	1	3	2	6	6	0	6		1–2	1–1		1–1
4	Malveira	6	0	3	3	3	9	−6	3		0–3	1–2	0–2	

Updated to match(es) played on unknown. Source: fpf.pt
Rules for classification: 1) points, 2) head-to-head points, 3) head-to-head goal difference, 4) goal difference, 5) matches won, 6) goals scored
(P) Promoted
