= 2024–25 Liga 3 (Portugal) =

3rd season of the Liga 3 (Portugal)

Liga 3
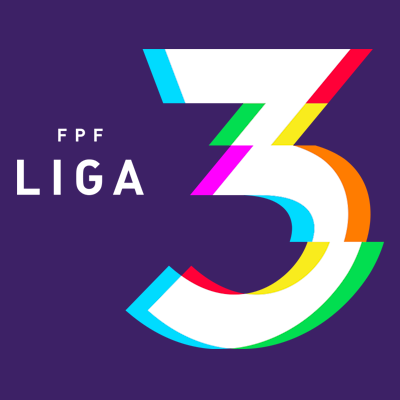
- Season: 2024–25
- Dates: 2 August 2024 – 17 May 2025
- Champions: Lusitânia Lourosa
- Promoted: Lusitânia Lourosa; Sporting CP B
- Relegated: Anadia; Lusitânia; Oliveira do Hospital; Vilaverdense
- Matches: 158
- Goals: 363 (2.3 per match)
- Top goalscorer: Tiago Leite (17 goals)
- Total attendance: 341,944 (296 matches)
- Average attendance: 1,155

The 2024–25 Liga 3 is the fourth season of Portuguese football's third-tier league, and the 78th season of recognised third-tier football in Portugal.

== Format ==
This competition consists of a first stage with all the teams then proceed to a promotion or relegation series depending on their performance.

== Teams ==
A total of 20 teams will contest the league, including 2 teams relegated from the 2023–24 Liga Portugal 2, 14 teams from the 2023–24 Liga 3 and 4 teams promoted from the 2023–24 Campeonato de Portugal.

=== Team changes ===
Relegated from 2023–24 Liga Portugal 2

- Belenenses
- Vilaverdense

Promoted from 2023–24 Campeonato de Portugal

- Amarante
- Lusitânia
- São João de Ver
- União Santarém

Promoted to 2024–25 Liga Portugal 2

- Alverca
- Felgueiras 1932

Relegated to 2024–25 Campeonato de Portugal

- Amora
- Canelas
- Pêro Pinheiro
- Vianense

=== Stadium and locations ===
Location of teams in 2024-25 Liga 3 (Mainland).
Yellow: Serie A;
Blue: Serie B.
Location of teams in 2024-25 Liga 3 (Azores).
Blue: Serie B.

Team	Location	Stadium	Capacity	2023–24 finish
Vilaverdense	Vila Verde	Campo da Cruz do Reguengo	1,000	17h LP2
Belenenses	Lisbon	Estádio do Restelo	19,856	18th LP2
Lusitânia Lourosa	Santa Maria da Feira	Estádio do Lusitânia de Lourosa FC	8,000	3rd Promotion
Braga B	Braga	Estádio Municipal 1° de Maio	28,000	4th Promotion
Académica	Coimbra	Estádio Cidade de Coimbra	29,622	5th Promotion
Varzim	Póvoa de Varzim	Estádio do Varzim Sport Club	7,280	6th Promotion
Atlético CP	Lisbon	Estádio da Tapadinha	4,000	7th Promotion
Sp. Covilhã	Covilhã	Estádio Municipal; José dos Santos Pinto	3,500	8th Promotion
Fafe	Fafe	Estádio Municipal de Fafe	4,000	1st Relegation S1
Sporting B	Alcochete	Estádio Aurélio Pereira	1,180	1st Relegation S2
Trofense	Trofa	Estádio Clube Desportivo Trofense	5,017	2nd Relegation S1
Caldas	Caldas da Rainha	Campo da Mata	5,700	2nd Relegation S2
Sanjoanense	São João da Madeira	Estádio Conde Dias Garcia	8,500	3rd Relegation S1
Oliveira do Hospital	Oliveira do Hospital	Estádio Municipal de Tábua	3,500	3rd Relegation S2
Anadia	Anadia	Estádio Municipal Eng.º; Sílvio Henriques Cerveira	6,500	4th Relegation S1
1.º Dezembro	Sintra	Complexo Desportivo do Real SC	1,200	4th Relegation S2
Amarante	Amarante	Estádio Municipal de Amarante	5,000	1st CP Promotion Serie 1
São João de Ver	Santa Maria da Feira	Estádio Sporting Clube São João de Ver	5,000	2nd CP Promotion Serie 1
Lusitânia	Angra do Heroísmo	Estádio João Paulo II	7,000	2nd CP Promotion Serie 2
União de Santarém	Santarém	Campo Chã das Padeiras	2,167	3rd CP Promotion Serie 2

== First stage ==
In the first stage, the 20 clubs will be divided in two series (Série A and B) of 10 teams, according to geographic criteria.

=== Série A ===
Pos	Team	Pld	W	D	L	GF	GA	GD	Pts	Qualification or relegation	VAR	LOU	FAF	AMA	BRA	TRO	SJV	ANA	SAN	VIL
1	Varzim	18	11	2	5	26	20	+6	35	Advance to Promotion Series		1–0	0–2	1–3	1–0	2–1	2–0	2–1	3–0	3–2
2	Lusitânia Lourosa	18	10	3	5	22	14	+8	33	Advance to Promotion Series	0–0		4–0	1–0	1–2	1–1	2–1	3–2	1–0	1–0
3	Fafe	18	9	4	5	24	20	+4	31	Advance to Promotion Series	2–0	1–2		4–1	1–0	1–0	2–1	1–1	1–1	1–0
4	Amarante	18	9	3	6	16	11	+5	30	Advance to Promotion Series	0–1	1–0	0–0		1–1	1–0	2–0	0–1	1–0	1–0
5	Braga B	18	6	9	3	19	13	+6	27	Advance to Relegation Series	0–0	1–2	2–0	0–0		0–0	2–0	1–0	2–2	2–1
6	Trofense	18	7	5	6	21	18	+3	26	Advance to Relegation Series	3–2	0–1	3–2	1–0	0–0		1–1	3–0	3–2	1–0
7	São João de Ver	18	6	5	7	27	27	0	23	Advance to Relegation Series	4–1	1–0	4–1	0–3	1–1	1–0		3–1	1–2	3–1
8	Anadia	18	6	4	8	23	28	−5	22	Advance to Relegation Series	0–2	2–0	1–1	1–0	1–3	4–2	2–2		2–1	1–2
9	Sanjoanense	18	2	6	10	17	28	−11	12	Advance to Relegation Series	1–2	1–1	0–1	0–1	2–2	0–2	2–2	1–2		1–0
10	Vilaverdense	18	1	5	12	11	27	−16	8	Advance to Relegation Series	1–3	0–2	0–3	0–1	0–0	0–0	2–2	1–1	1–1	

Updated to match(es) played on 26 January 2025. Source: Liga 3
Rules for classification: 1) points, 2) head-to-head points, 3) head-to-head goal difference, 4) goal difference, 5) matches won, 6) goals scored

=== Série B ===
Pos	Team	Pld	W	D	L	GF	GA	GD	Pts	Qualification	ATL	1DE	BEL	SPO	ACA	USA	CAL	SPC	OLI	LUS
1	Atlético CP	18	10	3	5	26	14	+12	33	Advance to Promotion Series		0–1	0–1	3–0	1–1	1–0	4–0	1–0	2–0	2–1
2	1º Dezembro	18	7	8	3	23	15	+8	29	Advance to Promotion Series	2–1		0–0	0–0	1–2	1–1	1–1	3–1	2–0	3–0
3	Belenenses	18	6	9	3	22	18	+4	27	Advance to Promotion Series	0–0	1–1		1–1	0–0	2–0	2–1	2–2	2–1	1–0
4	Sporting B	18	6	8	4	23	23	0	26 (Note: Head-to-head: Sporting B 2–1 Académica; Académica 0–0 Sporting B.)	Advance to Promotion Series	0–1	1–1	2–1		2–1	3–3	4–1	1–0	1–1	0–0
5	Académica	18	6	8	4	31	25	+6	26	Advance to Relegation Series	1–3	1–2	1–0	0–0		1–0	2–3	1–1	2–2	5–1
6	União Santarém	18	7	3	8	22	22	0	24	Advance to Relegation Series	2–0	1–0	1–2	3–0	0–3		0–1	0–1	2–2	1–0
7	Caldas	18	6	5	7	22	28	−6	23	Advance to Relegation Series	1–1	1–1	1–1	1–2	1–1	0–3		1–2	2–1	1–0
8	Sp. Covilhã	18	6	4	8	21	26	−5	22	Advance to Relegation Series	1–3	0–3	2–2	2–3	3–4	3–1	1–0		1–0	0–0
9	Oliveira do Hospital	18	3	7	8	21	26	−5	16	Advance to Relegation Series	3–2	3–0	2–2	2–1	1–1	1–2	1–2	0–1		1–1
10	Lusitânia	18	2	7	9	14	28	−14	13	Advance to Relegation Series	0–1	1–1	2–1	2–2	3–3	1–2	1–4	1–0	0–0	

Updated to match(es) played on 22 January 2025. Source: Liga 3
Rules for classification: 1) points, 2) head-to-head points, 3) head-to-head goal difference, 4) goal difference, 5) matches won, 6) goals scored

== Second stage ==
=== Promotion stage ===
The eight qualified teams of each series will playing against each other in a home-and-away double round-robin system. The winners and runner-ups of the series will be automatically promoted to Liga Portugal 2. The third placed team will face the 16th placed of Liga Portugal 2 for the last spot in Liga Portugal 2.

Pos	Team	Pld	W	D	L	GF	GA	GD	Pts	Promotion or qualification	LOU	SPO	BEL	VAR	FAF	1DE	AMA	ATL
1	Lusitânia Lourosa (C, P)	14	9	3	2	20	13	+7	30	Promotion to Liga Portugal 2		2–1	1–0	2–0	2–1	2–1	2–1	2–0
2	Sporting B (P)	14	7	5	2	18	10	+8	26	Promotion to Liga Portugal 2	1–0		1–3	2–0	0–0	3–0	2–0	2–1
3	Belenenses	14	5	7	2	19	13	+6	22	Advance to Playoff	1–1	1–1		0–0	3–2	2–0	0–0	1–1
4	Varzim	14	6	3	5	21	14	+7	21		4–0	1–1	0–0		5–3	2–0	1–2	2–1
5	Fafe	14	4	2	8	18	23	−5	14 (Note: Head-to-head: Fafe 3–1 1º Dezembro; 1º Dezembro 1–0 Fafe.)		1–2	1–2	0–1	1–0		3–1	1–1	2–0
6	1º Dezembro	14	4	2	8	13	24	−11	14		1–3	1–1	3–1	0–3	1–0		2–1	0–1
7	Amarante	14	3	4	7	14	22	−8	13 (Note: Head-to-head: Amarante 2–0 Atlético CP; Atlético CP 3–1 Amarante.)		1–1	0–1	1–4	2–1	1–3	1–1		2–0
8	Atlético CP	14	3	4	7	14	18	−4	13		0–0	0–0	2–2	0–2	4–0	1–2	3–1	

Updated to match(es) played on 17 May 2025. Source: Liga 3
Rules for classification: 1) points, 2) head-to-head points, 3) head-to-head goal difference, 4) goal difference, 5) matches won, 6) goals scored
(C) Champions; (P) Promoted

=== Relegation stage ===
The bottom 12 teams are divided in two series of 6 teams, playing against each other in a home-and-away double round-robin system. To account for their performance in the first stage, teams will start with bonification points, as follows:

- The 5th placed teams starting with 9 points.
- The best-6th placed team starting with 8 points, while the worst one starting with 7.
- The 7th placed teams starting with 6 points.
- The best-8th placed team starting with 5 points, while the worst one starting with 4.
- The best-9th placed team starting with 3 points, while the worst one starting with 2.
- The best-10th placed team starting with 1 points, while the worst one starting with 0.

The bottom two teams of each series will be relegated to Campeonato de Portugal.

==== Serie 1 ====
Pos	Team	Pld	W	D	L	GF	GA	GD	Pts	Relegation	BRA	SAN	TRO	SJV	ANA	VIL
1	Braga B	10	5	3	2	13	9	+4	27			0–1	1–0	3–3	0–0	3–2
2	Sanjoanense	10	6	3	1	18	11	+7	23		1–1		3–1	5–2	1–1	2–1
3	Trofense	10	4	1	5	10	10	0	21		0–2	2–0		3–0	2–0	0–2
4	São João de Ver	10	3	3	4	11	16	−5	18		1–0	2–2	0–1		0–1	1–1
5	Anadia (R)	10	3	3	4	7	8	−1	16	Relegation to Campeonato de Portugal	1–2	0–1	1–1	0–1		2–0
6	Vilaverdense (R)	10	2	1	7	8	13	−5	7	Relegation to Campeonato de Portugal	0–1	1–2	1–0	0–1	0–1	

Updated to match(es) played on 4 May 2025. Source: Liga 3
Rules for classification: 1) points, 2) head-to-head points, 3) head-to-head goal difference, 4) goal difference, 5) matches won, 6) goals scored
(R) Relegated

==== Serie 2 ====
Pos	Team	Pld	W	D	L	GF	GA	GD	Pts	Relegation	USA	ACA	CAL	SPC	OLI	LUS
1	União Santarém	10	6	3	1	14	3	+11	28			0–0	0–0	1–2	2–0	2–0
2	Académica	10	5	3	2	17	13	+4	27		0–4		1–2	2–1	2–1	4–2
3	Caldas	10	3	3	4	7	13	−6	18		0–1	0–4		0–1	2–1	2–1
4	Sp. Covilhã	10	2	3	5	8	12	−4	14		0–1	1–1	1–1		1–1	1–2
5	Oliveira do Hospital (R)	10	2	4	4	12	14	−2	13	Relegation to Campeonato de Portugal	0–2	2–2	3–0	1–0		1–1
6	Lusitânia (R)	10	2	4	4	11	14	−3	11	Relegation to Campeonato de Portugal	1–1	0–1	0–0	2–0	2–2	

Updated to match(es) played on 4 May 2025. Source: Liga 3
Rules for classification: 1) points, 2) head-to-head points, 3) head-to-head goal difference, 4) goal difference, 5) matches won, 6) goals scored
(R) Relegated

== Number of teams by district ==
Rank	District Football Associations	Number	Teams
1	Aveiro	4	Anadia, Lusitânia Lourosa, Sanjoanense and São João de Ver
1	Lisbon	4	1.º Dezembro, Atlético CP, Belenenses and Sporting B
3	Braga	3	Braga B, Fafe and Vilaverdense
3	Porto	3	Amarante, Trofense and Varzim
5	Coimbra	2	Académica and Oliveira do Hospital
6	Angra do Heroísmo	1	Lusitânia
6	Castelo Branco	1	Sp. Covilhã
6	Santarém	1	União de Santarém
6	Leiria	1	Caldas
