= Danny McGrath =

Irish footballer (born 2006)

Personal information
- Date of birth: 28 January 2006 (age 20)
- Height: 1.73 m (5 ft 8 in)
- Position: Midfielder

Team information
- Current team: São João de Ver

Youth career
- Balbriggan
- St. Kevin's Boys
- Bohemians

Senior career*
| Years | Team | Apps | (Gls) |
| 2023 | Bohemians | 0 | (0) |
| 2023–2025 | Lommel | 6 | (0) |
| 2026– | São João de Ver | 0 | (0) |

International career^{‡}
| 2021–2022 | Republic of Ireland U16 | 5 | (0) |
| 2022–2023 | Republic of Ireland U17 | 16 | (0) |
| 2024 | Republic of Ireland U19 | 7 | (0) |
- * Club domestic league appearances and goals as of 19:43, 9 December 2025 (UTC) ‡ National team caps and goals as of 17:08, 1 May 2025 (UTC)

Daniel Negry-McGrath (born 28 January 2006) is an Irish professional footballer who plays as a midfielder for Portuguese Liga 3 club São João de Ver.

== Club career ==
McGrath began playing football with Balbriggan FC, before moving to St. Kevin's Boys and then to the academy of Bohemians, where he turned professional and appeared in one Leinster Senior Cup game for the first-team. In September 2023 he signed for Belgian club Lommel. On 4 July 2025, Lommel confirmed that McGrath's contract had been terminated by mutual consent with immediate affect.

== International career ==
McGrath has represented Ireland at under-17 level, serving as vice captain.

== Personal life ==
McGrath has a Brazilian mother and is fluent in Portuguese.

== Career statistics ==
As of match played on 8 March 2025

Appearances and goals by club, season and competition
| Club | Season | League | | | National cup (Note: Includes FAI Cup & Belgian Cup) | | Other | | Total | |
| Club | Season | Division | Apps | Goals | Apps | Goals | Apps | Goals | Apps | Goals |
|---|---|---|---|---|---|---|---|---|---|---|
| Bohemians | 2023 | LOI Premier Division | 0 | 0 | 0 | 0 | 1 (Note: Appearance(s) in the Leinster Senior Cup) | 0 | 1 | 0 |
| Lommel | 2023–24 | Challenger Pro League | 1 | 0 | 0 | 0 | 0 | 0 | 1 | 0 |
| Lommel | 2024–25 | Challenger Pro League | 5 | 0 | 0 | 0 | – | | 5 | 0 |
| Lommel | Total | | 6 | 0 | 0 | 0 | 0 | 0 | 6 | 0 |
| Career total | | | 6 | 0 | 0 | 0 | 1 | 0 | 7 | 0 |
