= Ká Semedo =

Cape Verdean footballer

Personal information
- Full name: Carlos Manuel Lobo Pires Semedo
- Date of birth: 1 September 1994 (age 32)
- Place of birth: Santiago, Cape Verde
- Height: 1.83 m (6 ft 0 in)
- Position: Forward

Team information
- Current team: Marco 09
- Number: 9

Senior career*
Years	Team	Apps	(Gls)
2012–2014	Sporting Praia		
2014–2017	Vitória Guimarães B	13	(1)
2016	→ AD Oliveirense (loan)	14	(2)
2016–2017	→ Sertanense (loan)	27	(4)
2017–2018	Sertanense	29	(11)
2018–2019	Sanjoanense	14	(2)
2019	Vilafranquense	0	(0)
2019–2020	Sertanense	22	(4)
2020–2021	São João Ver	22	(3)
2021–2022	Idanhense	24	(7)
2022–2025	Amarante	83	(24)
2025–2026	Fafe	25	(3)
2026–	Marco 09	5	(3)
- * Club domestic league appearances and goals as of 12 September 2026

Carlos Manuel Lobo Pires Semedo (born 1 September 1994) known as Ká Semedo, is a Cape Verdean footballer who plays for Portuguese Liga 3 club Marco 09 as a forward.

== Career ==
On 11 April 2015, Ká Semedo made his professional debut with Vitória Guimarães B in a 2014–15 Segunda Liga match against Tondela.
