= José Carlos Chastre =

Portuguese footballer

José Chastre
Personal information
- Full name: José Carlos da Silva Fernandes Chastre
- Date of birth: 11 February 1993 (age 33)
- Place of birth: Matosinhos, Portugal
- Height: 1.85 m (6 ft 1 in)
- Position: Goalkeeper

Team information
- Current team: Salgueiros

Youth career
- 2002–2007: Porto
- 2007–2012: Leixões

Senior career*
Years	Team	Apps	(Gls)
2012–2015	Leixões	45	(0)
2015–2016	Famalicão	16	(0)
2016–2018	União Madeira	20	(0)
2018–2019	Rieti	13	(0)
2019–2020	Mafra	0	(0)
2021–2022	Salgueiros	26	(0)
2022–2023	Oliveira Hospital	27	(0)
2023–	Salgueiros	65	(1)
- * Club domestic league appearances and goals as of 22:20, 1 July 2026 (UTC)

José Carlos da Silva Fernandes Chastre (born 11 February 1993) is a Portuguese professional footballer who plays as a goalkeeper for S.C. Salgueiros.

== Club career ==
Born in Matosinhos, Chastre joined local Leixões SC's youth system in 2007, aged 14. On 4 August 2013, he made his competitive debut for the first team, appearing in a 3–2 home win against Atlético Clube de Portugal in the first round of the Taça da Liga. His first match in the Segunda Liga took place on 22 January of the following year, being one of seven players sent off in a 1–1 draw at Sporting CP B.

Chastre became first choice in the 2014–15 season, playing 30 of the first 34 league fixtures. However, in March 2015, he cut ties with the club claiming unpaid wages, going on to represent still in the second tier F.C. Famalicão and C.F. União.

On 2 August 2018, Chastre signed a three-year contract with Italian Serie C team F.C. Rieti. The following 10 May, he left by mutual consent.

Chaster joined second-division side C.D. Mafra in July 2019. His spell there was undermined by a scaphoid bone injury, and he left after only two Taça de Portugal appearances.

After one year of inactivity, Chastre resumed his career in the lower leagues, with S.C. Salgueiros and F.C. Oliveira do Hospital.
