= Abdul Ibrahim (footballer) =

Ghanaian footballer

Personal information
- Full name: Abdul Wahab Ibrahim
- Date of birth: 13 January 1999 (age 27)
- Place of birth: Ghana
- Height: 1.76 m (5 ft 9 in)
- Position: Leftback

Team information
- Current team: Vilaverdense
- Number: 17

Senior career*
Years	Team	Apps	(Gls)
2016–2017	WAFA	25	(0)
2017–2020	Chaves II	28	(2)
2020–2022	Famalicão	2	(0)
2022–2024	Real	39	(4)
2024–	Vilaverdense	23	(1)
- * Club domestic league appearances and goals as of 25 June 2025

Abdul Wahab Ibrahim (born 13 January 1999) is a Ghanaian professional footballer who plays as a leftback for Portuguese club Vilaverdense.

== Club career ==
A youth product of WAFA in Ghana, he moved to the reserves of Chaves in 2017. On 11 August 2020, Ibrahim joined Famalicão in the Primeira Liga. Ibrahim made his professional debut with Famalicão in a 5-1 league loss to Benfica on 18 September 2020.
