= Tiago Ventura =

Portuguese footballer

Personal information
- Full name: Tiago Ventura da Silva
- Date of birth: 19 June 2002 (age 24)
- Place of birth: Gondomar, Portugal
- Height: 1.75 m (5 ft 9 in)
- Position: Forward

Team information
- Current team: Felgueiras
- Number: 80

Youth career
- 2021–2024: Vizela

Senior career*
Years	Team	Apps	(Gls)
2022	Vizela	0	(0)
2024−2025	Rebordosa	3	(2)
2025−2026	Amarante	27	(8)
2026−	Felgueiras	6	(1)
- * Club domestic league appearances and goals as of 12 September 2026

Tiago Ventura da Silva (born 19 June 2002) is a Portuguese professional footballer who plays as a forward for Liga Portugal 2 club Felgueiras. During the 2025–26 season, he won the Liga 3 Player of the Month award in April.
