= José Macedo Vieira =

Portuguese politician

José Macedo Vieira (born 1949, in Beiriz) is the president of the city council of Póvoa de Varzim since 1993 by the PSD party.

He is also president of LIPOR (since 2001) Residues management body of Greater Porto, Council of Administration of Varzim Lazer E.M, vice-president of Metro do Porto, SA and of Águas do Cávado, S.A.
