= Eduardo Souza =

Eduardo Souza may refer to:

- Eduardo do Nascimento Souza (born 1980), Brazilian football manager
- Eduardo Godinho Felipe de Souza (born 1981), Brazilian footballer
- Eduardo Prieto Souza (1882–?), Mexican Olympic fencer
- Eduardo Rodrigues Souza (born 1991)
- Eduardo de Souza (born 1944), Brazilian Olympic sailor
