= 2026–27 Liga Portugal 2 =

Portuguese football season

Liga Portugal 2
- Season: 2026–27
- Dates: 8 August 2026 – 17 May 2027
- Matches: 297
- All statistics correct as of 18 May 2026.

The 2026–27 Liga Portugal 2 (also known as Liga Portugal 2 Meu Super for sponsorship reasons) is the 37th season of Portuguese football's second-tier league and the seventh season under the current Liga Portugal 2 title.

== Teams ==
=== Changes ===
The following teams changed division since the 2025–26 season.

To Liga Portugal 2
▼ Relegated from Primeira Liga
- Tondela
- AFS
▲ Promoted from Liga 3
- Amarante
- Académica

From Liga Portugal 2
▲ Promoted to Primeira Liga
- Marítimo
- Académico de Viseu
▼ Relegated to Liga 3
- Paços de Ferreira
- Oliveirense

=== Location and stadiums ===
Locations of teams in the 2026–27 Liga Portugal 2.

Team	Location	Stadium	Capacity	2025–26 season
Académica^{↑}	Coimbra	Estádio Cidade de Coimbra	29,622	2nd in Liga 3
AFS^{↓}	Vila das Aves	Estádio do Clube Desportivo das Aves	6,230	18th in PL
Amarante^{↑}	Amarante	Estádio Municipal de Amarante	5,000	1st in Liga 3
Benfica B	Seixal	Benfica Campus - Campo n.° 1	2,644	10th in LP 2
Chaves	Chaves	Estádio Municipal Eng.° Manuel Branco Teixeira	8,400	9th in LP 2
Farense	Faro	Estádio de São Luís	7,000	16th in LP 2
Feirense	Santa Maria da Feira	Estádio Marcolino Castro	5,401	8th in LP 2
Felgueiras	Felgueiras	Estádio Dr. Machado de Matos	7,540	11th in LP 2
Leixões	Matosinhos	Estádio do Mar	6,000	7th in LP 2
Lusitânia Lourosa	Lourosa	Estádio do Lusitânia de Lourosa FC	4,900	12th in LP 2
Penafiel	Penafiel	Estádio Municipal 25 de Abril	5,230	14th in LP 2
Portimonense	Portimão	Estádio Municipal de Portimão	4,961	15th in LP 2
Porto B	Vila Nova de Gaia	Estádio Luís Filipe Menezes	3,800	5th in LP 2
Sporting CP B	Alcochete	Estádio Aurélio Pereira	1,180	13th in LP 2
Tondela^{↓}	Tondela	Estádio João Cardoso	5,000	17th in PL
Torreense	Torres Vedras	Estádio Manuel Marques	2,431	3rd in LP 2
União de Leiria	Leiria	Estádio Dr. Magalhães Pessoa	23,888	6th in LP 2
Vizela	Vizela	Estádio do Futebol Clube de Vizela	6,000	4th in LP 2

== Standings ==
=== League table ===
Pos	Team	Pld	W	D	L	GF	GA	GD	Pts	Promotion, qualification or relegation
1	Penafiel	11	7	1	3	23	12	+11	22	Promotion to the Primeira Liga
2	Lusitânia Lourosa	11	6	4	1	17	10	+7	22	
3	Sporting CP B (Note: Ineligible for promotion)	10	7	1	2	16	8	+8	22	Promotion to the Primeira Liga
4	Benfica B	10	6	2	2	14	8	+6	20	
5	Tondela	11	6	1	4	15	11	+4	19	Qualification for the Promotion play-off
6	Académica	11	5	2	4	16	13	+3	17	
7	União de Leiria	10	5	2	3	16	13	+3	17	
8	Farense	11	4	3	4	17	16	+1	15	
9	Vizela	10	4	3	3	12	11	+1	15	
10	Portimonense	11	4	3	4	7	10	−3	15	
11	Leixões	11	4	2	5	15	17	−2	14	
12	AFS	10	3	4	3	13	12	+1	13	
13	Torreense	10	2	4	4	10	13	−3	10	
14	Amarante	11	2	4	5	10	14	−4	10	
15	Felgueiras	11	1	6	4	13	16	−3	9	
16	Porto B	10	2	2	6	8	18	−10	8	Qualification for the Relegation play-off
17	Chaves	11	2	2	7	11	23	−12	8	Relegation to the Liga 3
18	Feirense	10	1	2	7	3	11	−8	5	Relegation to the Liga 3

Updated to match(es) played on 15 November 2026. Source: Liga Portugal
Rules for classification: 1) Points; 2) Head-to-head points; 3) Head-to-head goal difference; 4) Goal difference; 5) Matches won; 6) Goals scored; 7) Play-off.

=== Fixtures and results ===
Home \ Away	ACA	AFS	AMA	BEN	CHA	FAR	FEI	FEL	LEX	LUS	PEN	PTM	POR	SPO	TON	TOR	UDL	VIZ
Académica			1–1	0–3			1–0		4–0	0–2								
AFS						0–0	2–0							0–1	2–1			2–2
Amarante				1–0						0–1		1–2	2–1				2–2	
Benfica B					3–1			1–0	1–0			1–1				0–2		
Chaves	1–4	2–2					1–0				2–3							2–1
Farense					4–0		2–1	1–1			1–4					2–1		
Feirense				0–0				0–0					0–1	1–3				
Felgueiras		1–1			2–1		3–3			2–2	1–2							
Leixões			3–1										1–2	1–2	1–0		2–4	
Lusitânia Lourosa		2–1			1–1	1–1							2–0			2–2		
Penafiel	4–1	1–2					1–0					0–1		2–0				
Portimonense									0–2						0–2	0–0		2–0
Porto B						1–3					0–3						1–1	2–2
Sporting CP B					1–0	2–1				1–2		3–0						
Tondela	0–2		2–1					3–2					3–0			1–0		
Torreense			1–0						0–0		2–2							0–3
União de Leiria	0–2	2–1		1–2								1–0			2–0			
Vizela	2–1		0–0					1–0						0–2			1–0	

Updated to match(es) played on 7 November 2026. Source: Liga Portugal 2
Legend: Blue = home team win; Yellow = draw; Red = away team win.
For upcoming matches, an "a" indicates there is an article about the rivalry between the two participants.

== Number of teams by district ==
Rank	District Football Associations	Number	Teams
1	Porto	6	AFS, Amarante, Felgueiras, Leixões, Penafiel and Porto B
2	Lisbon	3	Benfica B, Sporting CP B and Torreense
3	Algarve	2	Farense and Portimonense
3	Aveiro	2	Feirense and Lusitânia Lourosa
5	Braga	1	Vizela
5	Coimbra	1	Académica
5	Leiria	1	União de Leiria
5	Vila Real	1	Chaves
5	Viseu	1	Tondela

== See also ==
- 2026–27 Primeira Liga
- 2026–27 Liga 3
- 2026–27 Campeonato de Portugal
- 2026–27 Taça da Liga
- 2026–27 Taça de Portugal
