= Vilaverdense F.C. =

Portuguese association football club

Vilaverdense
- Full name: Vilaverdense Futebol Clube
- Founded: 1953; 73 years ago
- Ground: Campo Cruz do Reguengo; Vila Verde, Portugal
- Capacity: 1,000
- Chairman: Isidro Fernandes
- Manager: Sérgio Machado
- League: Campeonato de Portugal
- 2024–25: Liga 3 First stage Série A, 10th of 10; Second stage Relegation stage Série 1, 6th of 6 (relegated)

Vilaverdense F.C. (known for four years as Länk FC Vilaverdense) is a Portuguese football club based in Vila Verde in the district of Braga. They currently play in the Campeonato de Portugal, the fourth tier of Portuguese football after relegation from Liga 3 in 2024–25.

The club is affiliated to Associação de Futebol de Braga and has competed in the AF Braga Taça. The club has also entered the national cup competition known as Taça de Portugal on occasion.

It also competes in women's football, with a more successful team playing in the first tier, Campeonato Nacional de Futebol Feminino, using the 3,000-seat Municipal Stadium.

== History ==
The club was founded in 1953 as Vilaverdense F.C. and play their home matches at Campo da Cruz do Reguengo in Vila Verde. The stadium is a 1,000 spectator all-seater.

In 2020, the club's name and crest was changed following an acquisition of 90% of the club's SAD (Anonymous Shareholder Sport Association) by Länk. These changes caused some controversy.

On 11 June 2023, In the 2022–23 season, following a strong season that had the team in the top half of the table for the majority of the time, they managed to jump to second place in Série A, in the promotion rounds finish in second place at Série 2 and qualified for the promotion play-off against B-SAD. They drew the first leg at home with 1–1 and won the second leg in Rio Maior with 0–1 and thus with an aggregate score of 1–2, secured promotion to the 2023–24 Liga Portugal 2 for the first time in history from next season. They were relegated after one season following a 17th finish.

In 2024–25, Vilaverdense secure relegation to Campeonato de Portugal from next season after second successive from Liga Portugal 2.

== Involvement with Länk ==
In 2020, a Canadian group named Länk acquired 90% of Vilaverdense's SAD, promising to improve the club's stadium. With this they changed the club's name to Länk Vilaverdense and its badge to one in black and white, removing the green used to represent Vila Verde ("Green Town"). The team's kits, however, are still green. Although the acquisition was approved by the club's associates, the changes made by Länk came under heavy fire by the club's supporters and caused controversy.

== League history ==
Season	Level	Division	Section	Place	Movements
1990–91	Tier 5	Distritais	AF Braga – 1ª divisão B		
1991–92	Tier 5	Distritais	AF Braga – 1ª divisão A		
1992–93	Tier 5	Distritais	AF Braga – 1ª divisão B		
1993–94	Tier 5	Distritais	AF Braga – 1ª divisão B		
1994–95	Tier 5	Distritais	AF Braga – Honra		
1995–96	Tier 5	Distritais	AF Braga – Honra		
1996–97	Tier 5	Distritais	AF Braga – Honra		
1997–98	Tier 5	Distritais	AF Braga – Honra		Promoted
1998–99	Tier 4	Terceira Divisão	Série A	13th	
1999–2000	Tier 4	Terceira Divisão	Série A	8th	
2000–01	Tier 4	Terceira Divisão	Série A	5th	
2001–02	Tier 4	Terceira Divisão	Série A	6th	
2002–03	Tier 4	Terceira Divisão	Série A	5th	
2003–04	Tier 4	Terceira Divisão	Série A	2nd	Promoted
2004–05	Tier 3	Segunda Divisão	Série Norte	6th	
2005–06	Tier 3	Segunda Divisão	Série Norte	13th	Relegated
2006–07	Tier 4	Terceira Divisão	Série A	14th	Relegated
2007–08	Tier 5	Distritais	AF Braga – Honra	1st	Promoted
2008–09	Tier 4	Terceira Divisão	Série A – 1ª Fase	12th	Relegation Group
	Tier 4	Terceira Divisão	Série A – Sub-Série A2	3rd	Relegated
2009–10	Tier 5	Distritais	AF Braga – Honra	9th	
2010–11	Tier 5	Distritais	AF Braga – Honra	1st	Promoted
2011–12	Tier 4	Terceira Divisão	Série A – 1ª Fase	5th	Promotion Group
	Tier 4	Terceira Divisão	Série A Fase Final	2nd	Promoted
2012–13	Tier 3	Segunda Divisão	Série Norte	13th	
2013–14	Tier 3	Campeonato Nacional	Série A	3rd	
As Länk Vilaverdense
Season	Level	Division	Section	Place	Movements
2021–22	Tier 4	Campeonato de Portugal	Série A – 1st stage	1st	Promotion Group
2021–22	Tier 4	Campeonato de Portugal	North zone – 2nd stage	2nd	Promoted to Liga 3
2022–23	Tier 3	Liga 3	Série A – 1st stage	2nd	2nd stage
2022–23	Tier 3	Liga 3	Série 2 – 2nd stage	2nd	3rd stage
2022–23	Tier 3	Liga 3	3rd stage	3rd	Promotion play-off and promoted to Liga Portugal 2 via play-off
2023–24	Tier 2	Liga Portugal 2	17th		Relegated to Liga 3
2024–25	Tier 3	Liga 3	Série A – 1st stage	10th	2nd stage in Relegation stage
2024–25	Tier 3	Liga 3	Série 1 – 2nd stage	6th	Relegation to Campeonato de Portugal
2025–26	Tier 4	Campeonato de Portugal	Série TBD – 1st stage		

== Players ==
=== Current squad ===
As of 19 July 2024

Note: Flags indicate national team as defined under FIFA eligibility rules; some limited exceptions apply. Players may hold more than one non-FIFA nationality.

No.	Pos.	Nation	Player
1	GK	POR	Cajó
2	DF	POR	Vasco Coelho
3	DF	GHA	Daniel Robertson
4	DF	BRA	Luiz Neto
5	MF	MLI	Momo Sacko
6	MF	BRA	Weslei Ferreira
7	MF	POR	Eduardo Barbosa
8	DF	POR	Ivo Cláudio
9	FW	BRA	Neemias Barbosa
10	MF	POR	Hugo Alves
11	MF	POR	Danilo Monteiro
12	GK	POR	Diogo Santos

No.	Pos.	Nation	Player
13	DF	CIV	Badra Camara
14	MF	POR	Diogo Madaleno
15	DF	POR	Jota Rego
16	DF	POR	Gonçalo Zuzarte
17	DF	GHA	Abdul Ibrahim
18	FW	POR	Yemi Agbaoye
19	DF	MLI	Baissa Niambélé
20	FW	CPV	Dica
21	MF	USA	Jude Burst
22	MF	BRA	Hiago Bagarolo
23	FW	BRA	João Pedro

=== Out on loan ===
Note: Flags indicate national team as defined under FIFA eligibility rules; some limited exceptions apply. Players may hold more than one non-FIFA nationality.

No.	Pos.	Nation	Player

== Honours ==
- AF Braga Divisão de Honra: 2010–11
- AF Braga Taça: 1988/89, 1990/91, 1992/93, 1997/98, 2009/10
