= Diogo Vila =

Portuguese footballer

Personal information
- Full name: Antero Diogo da Silva Ferreira
- Date of birth: February 7, 1990 (age 36)
- Place of birth: Vila Meã, Portugal
- Height: 1.86 m (6 ft 1 in)
- Position: Centre back

Team information
- Current team: Amarante
- Number: 64

Youth career
- 2000–2006: Vila Meã
- 2006–2009: Leixões

Senior career*
Years	Team	Apps	(Gls)
2009–2010	Infesta	27	(1)
2010–2011	Padroense	30	(1)
2011–2012	AEK Larnaca	9	(0)
2012–2013	Naval	15	(1)
2013	Académico de Viseu	0	(0)
2013	Felgueiras 1932	1	(0)
2014	Freamunde	4	(0)
2014–2016	Cinfães	55	(3)
2016–2017	Amarante	26	(4)
2017–2018	Merelinense	19	(1)
2018–2019	Amarante	30	(3)
2019–2021	Etzella Ettelbruck	26	(4)
2021–2026	Amarante	108	(8)
2026	Alpendorada	9	(0)
2026-	Celoricense	7	(0)
- * Club domestic league appearances and goals as of 18 October 2026

Antero Diogo da Silva Ferreira (born 7 February 1990) known as Diogo Vila, is a Portuguese footballer who plays for Celoricense as a defender.
