= São João de Ver =

Civil parish in Portugal

- Civil parish
- Location in Portugal
- Coordinates: 40.954°N 8.551°W
- Country: Portugal
- Region: Norte
- Metropolitan area: Porto
- District: Aveiro
- Municipality: Santa Maria da Feira

Area
  - Total: 15.37 km^{2} (5.93 sq mi)

Population (2011)
  - Total: 10,579
  - Density: 690/km^{2} (1,800/sq mi)
- Time zone: UTC+00:00 (WET)
  - Summer (DST): UTC+01:00 (WEST)

São João de Ver is a Portuguese parish, located in the municipality of Santa Maria da Feira. The population in 2011 was 10,579, in an area of 15.37 km^{2}.

== Landmarks ==
- Casa da Torre or Quinta da Torre
- Traces of the royal road linking Lisbon - Porto in Airas
