= F.C. Oliveira do Hospital =

Portuguese football club

Oliveira do Hospital
- Full name: Futebol Clube de Oliveira do Hospital
- Founded: 1938; 88 years ago
- Ground: Estádio Municipal, Oliveira do Hospital, Portugal
- Capacity: 3,500
- Chairman: Mário Brito
- Manager: Leonardo Neiva
- League: Campeonato de Portugal
- 2024–25: Liga 3 First stage Série B, 9th of 10; Relegation stage Série 2, 5th of 6 (relegated)
Home colours	Away colours

Futebol Clube de Oliveira do Hospital is a professional Portuguese football and futsal club based in Oliveira do Hospital, Coimbra. Founded in 1938, it currently plays in the Campeonato de Portugal, the fourth tier of Portuguese football after relegation from Liga 3 in 2024–25, holding home matches at Estádio Municipal de Oliveira do Hospital, which holds 3,500 spectators.

== Appearances ==
=== Football ===
- Tier 3: 11
- Tier 4: 12

== League and Cup history ==
=== Football ===
Season		Pos.	Pl.	W	D	L	GS	GA	+/-	P	Portuguese Cup	Notes
2005–06	Segunda Divisão – Third Tier	14	26	2	6	18	22	53	–31	12p		Relegated
2006–07	Terceira Divisão – Fourth Tier	8	28	11	6	11	37	34	3	39p		
2007–08	Terceira Divisão – Fourth Tier	7	26	10	8	8	37	25	12	38p		
2007–08	Terceira Divisão – Relegation Group 1	3	6	1	1	4	3	6	–3	23p		Relegated
2008–09	AF Coimbra	-	-	-	-	-	-	-	-	-		
2009–10	AF Coimbra	-	-	-	-	-	-	-	-	-		
2010–11	AF Coimbra	1	-	-	-	-	-	-	-	-		

=== Futsal ===
==== Men's competition ====
- 2006–07: 7th (AF Coimbra)
- 2007–08: 1st (AF Coimbra)
- 2008–09: 8th (AF Coimbra)
