= Estádio do Varzim SC =

Stadium in Póvoa de Varzim, Portugal

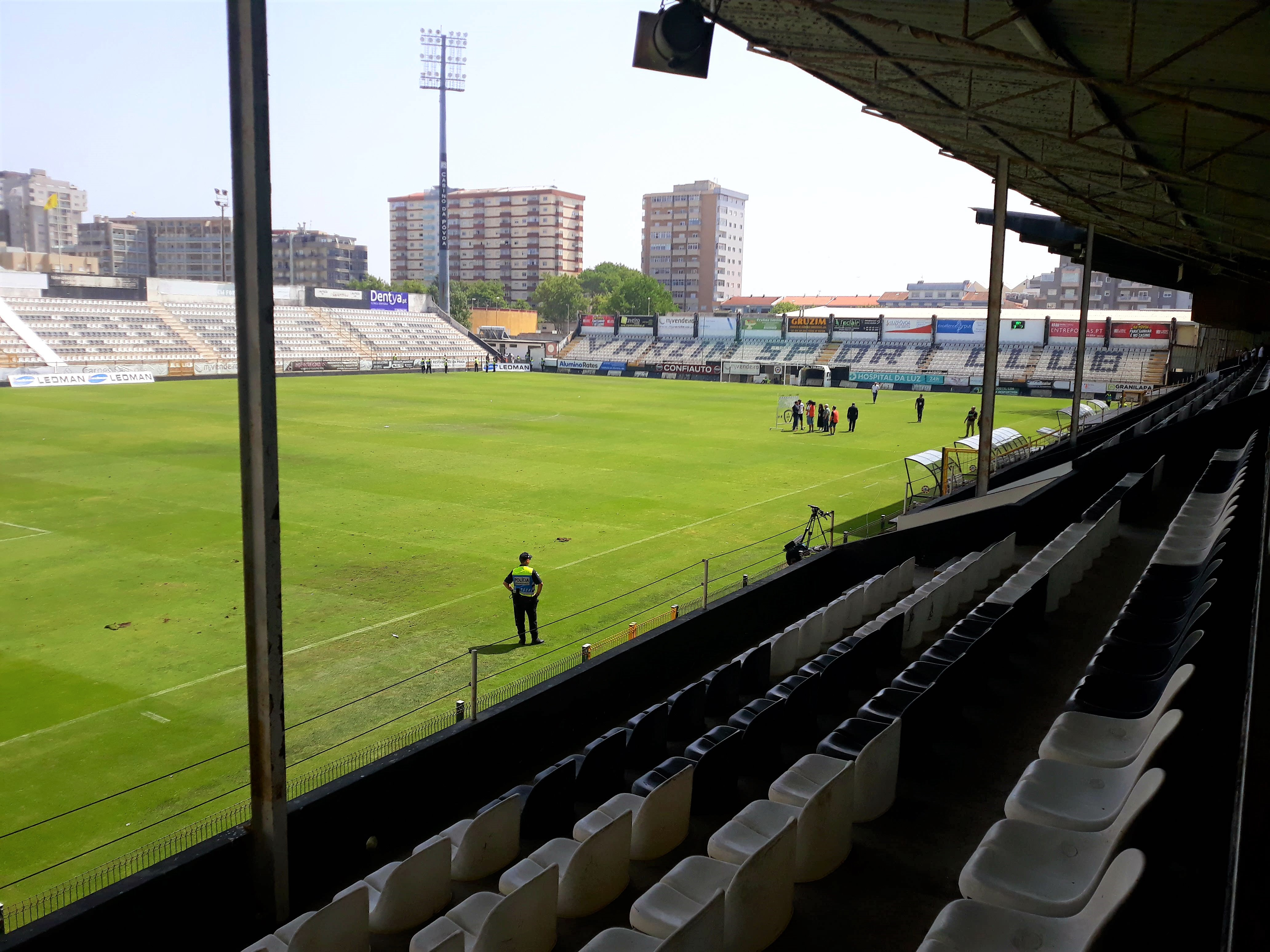
- Estádio do Varzim Sport Club, Póvoa de Varzim (Portugal)
- Interactive map of Estádio do Varzim SC
- Full name: Estádio do Varzim Sport Club
- Address: Póvoa de Varzim; Portugal
- Coordinates: 41°23′16.21″N 8°46′21.27″W
- Capacity: 7,280
- Type: Multi-Use

The Estádio do Varzim Sport Club is a multi-use stadium in Póvoa de Varzim, Portugal. It is used mostly for football matches, and is the home stadium of Varzim Sport Clube. Able to hold 7,280 people, it was built in 1929.

== New stadium ==
Varzim has its own old stadium, at Lagoa Beach, close to other sports equipment in the north area of the town. In 1999, the municipality approved construction rights for the terrain where it lies, and due to real estate speculation, it now has a huge value, between €20 and €29 million.

For years, a new stadium was under debate, but a financial crisis made it urgent. Just by signing the contract-promise for selling the terrain, the club could have its debts paid and still have enough for a new stadium on another location. The new stadium would be next to the city park, where already a municipal stadium and training fields existed.

Initially, it was the board's intention to adapt the existing stadium at the city park to be able for professional football venues (increasing capacity and improving its facilities), thus having it serve the needs of both Varzim and the municipality.

Mayor Macedo Vieira, however, stated that the existing stadium was not to be used by Varzim because it was not built with this purpose. The political opposition argued against this decision, stating that the use of the municipal stadium would prevent Varzim from having to buy terrain and build a new stadium from scratch, thus reducing the amount of construction to be allowed on the old stadium location, because its terrain could then be sold for much less.

The club was, therefore, forced to build a new stadium. The contract-promise was signed with a Portuguese-Spanish group in late 2006, with construction was expected to begin in 2009, but later postponed due to the international financial crisis.
