= Estádio Municipal do Marco de Canaveses =

Stadium in Marco de Canaveses, Portugal

Coordinates: 41.193°N 8.146°W

Estádio Municipal do Marco de Canaveses is a multi-use stadium in Marco de Canaveses, Portugal. It opened in 1988, and is able to hold 6,000 people. It is primarily used for football matches, and is the home stadium of Marco 09.

In 2007, the stadium previously known as Avelino Ferreira Torres, officially changed its name to Estádio Municipal do Marco de Canaveses.

It hosted the Concursos Nacionais de Manobras between the 15-16 June 2024.
