= Estádio Conde Dias Garcia =

Multi-use stadium in São João da Madeira, Portugal

Coordinates: 40°53′53.66″N 8°29′56.66″W

- Interactive map of Estádio Conde Dias Garcia
- Full name: Estádio Conde Dias Garcia
- Location: São João da Madeira, Portugal
- Owner: Sanjoanense
- Capacity: 8,500
- Surface: Grass
- Field size: 103 x 67 metres

Construction
- Opened: 1935

Tenant
- Sanjoanense

The Estádio Conde Dias Garcia is a multi-use stadium in São João da Madeira, Portugal. It is currently used mostly for football matches and is the home ground of A.D. Sanjoanense.

The stadium is one of the largest in the Aveiro District, with a capacity of 8,500 spectators. The venue has natural topography and stands all around, featuring an oval shape of the dirt athletics track, which is now quite degraded.
