= Estádio Municipal de Fafe =

Multi-use stadium in Fafe, Portugal

Coordinates: 41°26′49.78″N 8°10′05.51″W

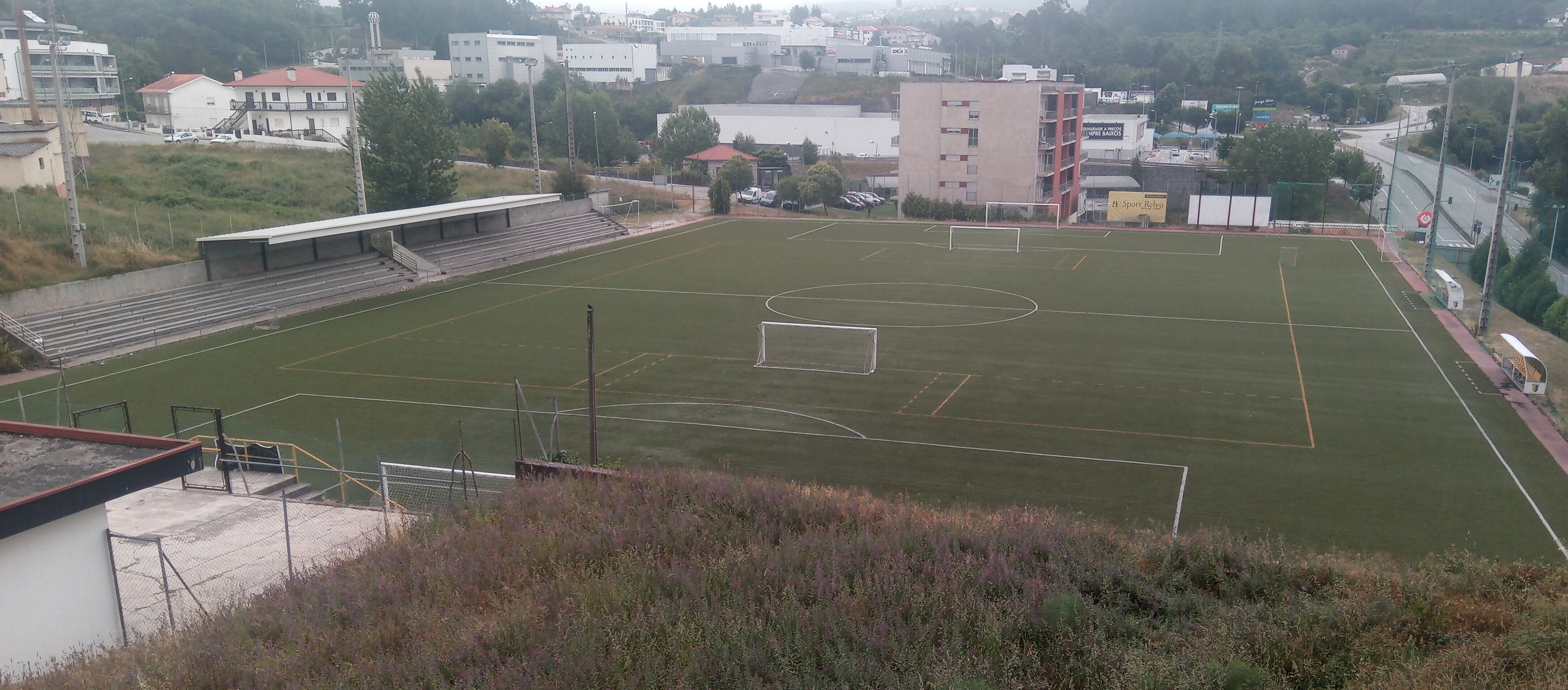
- Interactive map of Estádio Municipal de Fafe
- Former names: Parque Municipal dos Desportos de Fafe
- Location: Fafe, Portugal
- Owner: Fafe Municipality
- Capacity: 4,000
- Surface: Grass
- Field size: 105 x 68 metres

Construction
- Opened: 1968
- Renovated: 2016
- Architect: Mário Valente

Tenant
- AD Fafe

Estádio Municipal de Fafe is a multi-use stadium in Fafe, Portugal. It is currently used mostly for football matches and is the home stadium of AD Fafe. The stadium is able to hold 4,000 people. It was built in 1968 and it is used by AD Fafe which currently plays in the Portuguese Third Division.

The home of the Fafe team, named Parque Municipal dos Desportos de Fafe until the 2015/16 season, when they were promoted to the Segunda Liga, underwent renovations to make it suitable for hosting professional league matches, and has since been known as Estádio Municipal de Fafe.
