= Estádio Municipal de Amarante =

Stadium in Amarante, Portugal

- Interactive map of Estádio Municipal de Amarante
- Full name: Estádio Municipal de Amarante
- Location: Amarante, Portugal
- Coordinates: 41°16′56″N 8°4′33″W
- Owner: Amarante Municipality
- Capacity: 5,000
- Surface: Grass
- Field size: 105 x 66 m

Construction
- Opened: March 1981; 45 years ago
- Renovated: 2006, 2026
- Architect: Vasco da Cunha Arquitectos

Tenants
- Amarante F.C. (1981–present); Fafe (2017)

Estadio Municipal de Amarante is a multi-purpose stadium in Amarante, Portugal. It is owned by the Amarante Municipality, being primarily used for football matches as the home ground of Amarante F.C.

== History ==
The stadium first opened in March 1981 and has a seating capacity of 5,000. Natural turf was installed in 1991, with an inauguration match held on January 20, 1991, between Amarante and FC Porto. The stadium underwent a major renovation in 2006 to feature a main stand, press boxes, and training areas. The club was awarded a 4-star certification as a youth training entity in 2020 by the Portuguese Football Federation, in recognition for its logistical conditions and facilities necessary for the conduct of sports training activities.

During 2016–17 LigaPro season, AD Fafe played three home matches at Estádio Municipal de Amarante, due to renovations at their own stadium.

The stadium received significant upgrades in 2026, with an investment of nearly 1 million euros to meet the requirements for hosting Liga Portugal 2 matches. These improvements included replacing the natural turf, installing seats in the upper stand, constructing visitor restrooms, implementing a CCTV surveillance system, and making other technical adjustments as identified in official reports. Of this amount, 217,000 euros were allocated to upgrading youth team facilities, including the 11-a-side training pitch, where the synthetic turf and fencing were replaced.

== Facilities ==
Venue	Area (m^{2})	Field size (m x m)	Typology
Estádio Municipal de Amarante	6930	105 x 66	Stadium
7-a-side pitch	2600	65 x 40	Training ground
11-a-side pitch	5278	91 x 58	Training ground
Training pitch	4940	95 x 52	Training ground
