= SC São João de Ver =

Portuguese sports club

S.C. São João de Ver
- Full name: Sporting Clube São João de Ver
- Nickname: Malapeiros
- Founded: 1929
- Ground: Estádio Clube São João de Ver, São João de Ver
- Capacity: 5,000
- Owner: Dani Alves
- Manager: vacant
- League: Liga 3
- 2023–24: Serie B, 2nd Promotion play off, 2nd (Promoted)
- Website: scsaojoaodever.com

SC São João de Ver is a professional association football club based in the parish of São João de Ver, municipality of Santa Maria da Feira, District of Aveiro Portugal. The team competes in Liga 3, the third tier of the Portuguese football league system. The club was founded in on June 25, 1929.

The men's football team plays in the Liga 3.

== History ==
The club was founded in 1929 in the city of São João de Ver in the council of Santa Maria da Feira of the Aveiro district and much of its history has been spent in the regional leagues of Aveiro until in the 2000/01 season it manages to ascend to the leagues.

After they won the promotion to the now defunct Second Division of Portugal, in which they spent just two seasons.

They have participated in the Portuguese Cup on some occasions without much success to date.

== Stadium ==
SC SJV play their home games at the São João de Ver Sporting Club Stadium.

== Current squad ==
As of 20 September 2026

Note: Flags indicate national team as defined under FIFA eligibility rules; some limited exceptions apply. Players may hold more than one non-FIFA nationality.

No.	Pos.	Nation	Player
1	GK	POR	Pedro Virgínia
4	DF	POR	Bruno Morais
5	DF	POR	Miguel Ventura
6	MF	GBS	Malam Camará
7	FW	VEN	Jeremi Machado
8	MF	POR	Tiago Campas
10	FW	POR	Nuno Pereira
11	FW	BRA	Luan Capanni
16	MF	ANG	Jessé
17	FW	POR	Luisinho
19	FW	POR	Joel Carvalho
21	DF	POR	Rui Bruno

No.	Pos.	Nation	Player
25	DF	POR	Ruca Morgado
29	MF	POR	Rodrigo Valente
30	GK	GBS	João Júnior
33	DF	BRA	Washington
40	DF	BRA	João Matos
55	DF	POR	Miguel Vilela
61	DF	POR	Rafael Vilela
87	FW	POR	Zequinha
—	GK	BRA	Ezequiel
—	MF	IRL	Danny McGrath
—	FW	BRA	Guilherme Azevedo

=== Out on loan ===
Note: Flags indicate national team as defined under FIFA eligibility rules; some limited exceptions apply. Players may hold more than one non-FIFA nationality.

No. / Pos. / Nation / Player; — / DF / POR / Valter Gomes (at Sousense until 30 June 2027)	No. / Pos. / Nation / Player; — / FW / BRA / Deivid Kauan (at Benfica U23 until 30 June 2027)

== Honours and achievements ==
=== Leagues ===
- Liga Regional de Aveiro: 1

2019/20

- Primera División de Aveiro: 2

1963/64, 1973/74

Cups

- Copa de Aveiro: 1

2018/19
