= Estádio do CD Trofense =

Stadium in Trofa, Portugal

Coordinates: 41°19′58.20″N 8°33′51.72″W

Estádio do Clube Desportivo Trofense
- Interactive map of Estádio do Clube Desportivo Trofense
- Full name: Estádio do Clube Desportivo Trofense
- Location: Trofa, Portugal
- Owner: Trofense
- Capacity: 5,017
- Surface: Grass
- Field size: 105 x 64 metres

Construction
- Built: 1950
- Opened: 24 December 1950
- Renovated: 2008

Tenant
- Trofense

The Estádio do Clube Desportivo Trofense is a multi-use stadium in Trofa, Portugal. It is currently used mostly for football matches and is the home stadium of C.D. Trofense. The stadium was built on the 24 December 1950 and has a seating capacity of 5,017.

It underwent many renovations during the year 2008, when Clube Desportivo Trofense gained promotion to the Primeira Liga from the Liga de Honra for the first time in their history.
