= Liga 3 (Portugal) =

Third tier association football competition

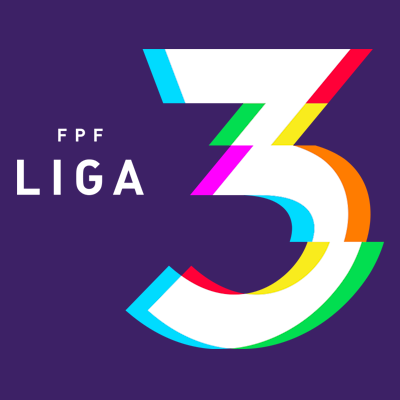
- Organising body: FPF
- Founded: 2021; 5 years ago
- Country: Portugal
- Confederation: UEFA
- Number of clubs: 20 (since 2023–24)
- Level on pyramid: 3
- Promotion to: Liga Portugal 2
- Relegation to: Campeonato de Portugal
- Domestic cup: Taça de Portugal
- Current champions: Amarante (1st title) (2025–26)
- Most championships: Torreense; União de Leiria; Alverca; Lusitânia Lourosa; Amarante (1 title)
- Current: 2026–27 Liga 3

The Liga 3, also known as Liga 3 Placard for sponsorship reasons, is the third-level football league in the Portuguese football league system, starting in 2021–22. It is a semi-professional national league organized by the Portuguese Football Federation (FPF).

The creation of this league is part of a restructuring of the Portuguese third tier, with Campeonato de Portugal, which saw the number of teams reduced, being relegated to fourth tier and the top teams competing there advancing to this new competition. In its first season, a total of 24 teams competed in the Liga 3, 2 of which were relegated from 2020–21 Liga Portugal 2 and 22 others which were promoted from 2020–21 Campeonato de Portugal. This number is set to be reduced to 20 teams from the 2023–24 season.

== History ==
In the 1990-1991 season, with the creation of the nationwide Liga de Honra (second professional division or D2), the regionalized Segunda Divisão (Second Division) championship, created in 1934, was relegated to the third division (D3). It was then renamed Segunda Divisão B (Second Division B).

From 1990 to 2005, the championship was divided into 3 groups by geographical division: Norte (North), Centro (Centre) and Sul (South). In 2005, the championship was split into 4 groups: Serie A, Serie B, Serie C and Serie D. But in 2009, the 3-group formula was reinstated.

In 2013, the championship underwent a major reorganisation, merging with the old Terceira Divisão (Third Division (D4)), and went from 48 to 80 teams. It was renamed the National Senior Championship and took place in eight 10-team series.

In the 2021-22 season, the Portuguese Football Federation created the Liga 3 to replace the former iteration of the third tier of Portugal's football league system (D3) which was at the time the Campeonato de Portugal (from then on D4). Both competitions (D3 and D4) remained two events organised by the federation. The Liga 3 was initially contested by 24 clubs in the first two seasons, and in the 2023–24 season the number of participants was reduced to 20.

== Format ==
This competition consists of a first stage with all the teams then proceed to a promotion or relegation series depending on their performance.

First Stage

In the first stage, the 20 clubs are divided in two series (Serie A and B) of 10 teams, according to geographic criteria. In each series, teams play against each other in a home-and-away double round-robin system. The four best-placed teams of the two series will advance to the promotion series and bottom six teams will proceed to the relegation series.

Promotion Stage

The eight qualified teams of each series will playing against each other in a home-and-away double round-robin system. The winners and runner-ups of the series will be automatically promoted to Liga Portugal 2. The third placed team will face the 16th placed of Liga Portugal 2 for the last spot in Liga Portugal 2. On this stage teams will be divided as follows.

Promotion Series
1st A
2nd A
3rd A
4th A
1st B
2nd B
3rd B
4th B

Relegation Stage

The bottom 12 teams are divided in two series of 6 teams, playing against each other in a home-and-away double round-robin system. To account for their performance in the first stage, teams will start with bonification points, with 5th placed teams starting with 8 points and 10th placed teams starting with 1. The bottom two teams of each series will be relegated to Campeonato de Portugal.

Relegation Series
| Serie 1 | Serie 2 |
|---|---|
| 5th A | 5th B |
| 6th B | 6th A |
| 7th B | 7th A |
| 8th A | 8th B |
| 9th A | 9th B |
| 10th B | 10th A |

== Seasons - league tables ==
| Decade | | 1st | 2nd | 3rd | 4th | 5th | 6th |
|---|---|---|---|---|---|---|---|
| 2020s: | — | 2021–22 | 2022–23 | 2023–24 | 2024–25 | 2025-26 | 2026-27 |

== List of champions ==
| Season | Championship Final | | | Promotion play-offs |
| Season | Champions | Score | Runners-up | Promotion play-offs |
|---|---|---|---|---|
| 2021–22 | Torreense | 1–1 (a.e.t.), (5–4 p) | Oliveirense | Alverca failed to obtain promotion. |
| 2022–23 | União de Leiria | 1–0 | Belenenses | Vilaverdense succeeded in obtaining promotion. |
| Season | League – Promotion Stage | | | Promotion play-offs |
| Season | Champions | Runners-up | Third place | Promotion play-offs |
| 2023–24 | Alverca | Felgueiras | Lusitânia Lourosa | Lusitânia Lourosa failed to obtain promotion. |
| 2024–25 | Lusitânia Lourosa | Sporting B | Belenenses | Belenenses failed to obtain promotion. |
| 2025–26 | Amarante | Académica de Coimbra | Belenenses | Belenenses failed to obtain promotion. |

=== Performance by club ===
| Club | Winners | Runners-up | Winning seasons | Runner-up seasons |
|---|---|---|---|---|
| Torreense | 1 | 0 | 2021–22 | – |
| União de Leiria | 1 | 0 | 2022–23 | – |
| Alverca | 1 | 0 | 2023–24 | – |
| Lusitânia Lourosa | 1 | 0 | 2024–25 | – |
| Amarante | 1 | 0 | 2025–26 | – |
| Oliveirense | 0 | 1 | – | 2021–22 |
| Belenenses | 0 | 1 | – | 2022–23 |
| Felgueiras | 0 | 1 | – | 2023–24 |
| Sporting B | 0 | 1 | – | 2024–25 |
| Académica de Coimbra | 0 | 1 | – | 2025–26 |

== All-time table ==
The all-time Liga 3 table is an overall record of all match results, points, and goals of every team that has played in Liga 3 since its inception in 2021. Championship/Third place playoff matches are included. Bonification points are not counted. The table is accurate as of the end of the 2025–26 season.

| Pos | Team | S | Pts | GP | W | D | L | GF | GA | GD | 1st | 2nd | 3rd | 4th | T | Debut | Since/ Last App | Notes |
|---|---|---|---|---|---|---|---|---|---|---|---|---|---|---|---|---|---|---|
| 1 | Braga B | 5 | 216 | 146 | 56 | 48 | 42 | 172 | 154 | 49 | – | – | – | 2 | 2 | 2021–22 | 2025–26 | |
| 2 | Fafe | 5 | 204 | 144 | 55 | 34 | 55 | 172 | 187 | -15 | – | – | – | – | – | 2021–22 | 2021–22 | |
| 3 | Caldas | 5 | 192 | 140 | 50 | 37 | 53 | 171 | 186 | -15 | – | – | – | – | – | 2021–22 | 2021–22 | |
| 4 | Académica | 4 | 186* | 120 | 69 | 40 | 31 | 172 | 137 | 35 | – | 1 | – | – | 1 | 2022–23 | 2025–26 | ^{[A]} |
| 5 | Sanjoanense | 5 | 182 | 140 | 45 | 45 | 50 | 180 | 189 | -9 | – | – | – | – | – | 2021–22 | 2025–26 | |
| 6 | Sporting B | 4 | 181 | 116 | 49 | 28 | 39 | 151 | 128 | 23 | – | 1 | – | – | 1 | 2021–22 | 2024–25 | |
| 7 | Varzim | 4 | 181 | 124 | 51 | 28 | 45 | 151 | 134 | 17 | – | – | – | 1 | 1 | 2022–23 | 2022–23 | |
| 8 | Alverca | 3 | 163 | 90 | 46 | 18 | 20 | 129 | 88 | 41 | 1 | – | 1 | – | 2 | 2021–22 | 2023–24 | |
| 9 | Belenenses | 3 | 159 | 93 | 43 | 30 | 20 | 139 | 95 | 44 | – | 1 | 2 | – | 3 | 2022–23 | 2024–25 | |
| 10 | Felgueiras | 3 | 159 | 88 | 47 | 18 | 23 | 127 | 83 | 44 | – | 1 | – | – | 1 | 2021–22 | 2023–24 | |
| 11 | Lusitânia Lourosa | 3 | 157 | 92 | 45 | 22 | 25 | 129 | 96 | 33 | 1 | – | 1 | – | 2 | 2021–22 | 2024–25 | |
| 12 | Amora | 4 | 156 | 112 | 44 | 21 | 47 | 140 | 143 | -3 | – | – | – | – | – | 2021–22 | 2025–26 | |
| 13 | São João de Ver | 4 | 144 | 112 | 33 | 45 | 34 | 124 | 130 | -6 | – | – | – | – | – | 2021–22 | 2024–25 | |
| 14 | Anadia | 4 | 138 | 112 | 37 | 24 | 51 | 127 | 153 | -26 | – | – | – | – | – | 2021–22 | 2024–25 | |
| 15 | Oliveira do Hospital | 4 | 133 | 112 | 30 | 39 | 43 | 130 | 154 | -24 | – | – | – | – | – | 2021–22 | 2024–25 | |
| 16 | Atlético CP | 3 | 128 | 92 | 35 | 24 | 34 | 111 | 100 | 11 | – | – | – | – | – | 2023–24 | 2023–24 | |
| 17 | União de Leiria | 2 | 124 | 59 | 38 | 10 | 11 | 107 | 52 | 55 | 1 | – | – | 1 | 2 | 2021–22 | 2022–23 | |
| 18 | Canelas 2010 | 3 | 123 | 84 | 31 | 24 | 29 | 98 | 108 | -10 | – | – | – | – | – | 2021–22 | 2023–24 | |
| 19 | Trofense | 3 | 117* | 88 | 30 | 26 | 32 | 95 | 90 | 5 | – | – | – | – | – | 2023–24 | 2023–24 | ^{[B]} |
| 20 | União de Santarém | 3 | 107 | 88 | 27 | 26 | 35 | 96 | 103 | -7 | – | – | – | – | – | 2021–22 | 2024–25 | |
| 21 | Amarante | 2 | 103 | 64 | 29 | 16 | 19 | 71 | 61 | 10 | 1 | – | – | – | 1 | 2024–25 | 2025–26 | |
| 22 | Vitória de Guimarães B | 3 | 102 | 88 | 27 | 21 | 40 | 94 | 114 | -20 | – | – | – | – | – | 2021–22 | 2025–26 | |
| 23 | Sporting da Covilhã | 3 | 101 | 88 | 24 | 29 | 35 | 94 | 114 | -20 | – | – | – | – | – | 2023–24 | 2023–24 | |
| 24 | 1º Dezembro | 3 | 101 | 88 | 25 | 25 | 38 | 84 | 111 | -27 | – | – | – | – | – | 2023–24 | 2025–26 | |
| 25 | Vitória de Setúbal | 2 | 75 | 56 | 21 | 12 | 23 | 76 | 84 | -8 | – | – | – | – | – | 2021–22 | 2022–23 | |
| 26 | Paredes | 2 | 73 | 56 | 17 | 22 | 17 | 57 | 49 | 8 | – | – | – | – | – | 2022–23 | 2025–26 | |
| 27 | Vilaverdense | 2 | 72 | 58 | 18 | 18 | 22 | 66 | 61 | 5 | – | – | 1 | – | 1 | 2022–23 | 2024–25 | |
| 28 | Real | 2 | 63 | 56 | 17 | 12 | 27 | 60 | 66 | -6 | – | – | – | – | – | 2021–22 | 2022–23 | |
| 29 | Montalegre | 2 | 57 | 56 | 14 | 15 | 27 | 68 | 89 | -21 | – | – | – | – | – | 2021–22 | 2022–23 | |
| 30 | Torreense | 1 | 54 | 29 | 17 | 3 | 9 | 40 | 30 | 10 | 1 | – | – | – | 1 | 2021–22 | 2021–22 | |
| 31 | Oliveirense | 1 | 51 | 29 | 14 | 9 | 6 | 51 | 38 | 13 | – | 1 | – | – | 1 | 2021–22 | 2026–27 | |
| 32 | Mafra | 1 | 51 | 32 | 14 | 9 | 7 | 45 | 43 | 2 | – | – | – | 1 | 1 | 2025–26 | 2025–26 | |
| 33 | Lusitano Évora | 2 | 43 | 31 | 12 | 7 | 12 | 32 | 31 | +1 | – | – | – | – | – | 2025–26 | 2025–26 | |
| 34 | Marco 09 | 1 | 33 | 28 | 7 | 12 | 9 | 23 | 31 | -8 | – | – | – | – | – | 2025–26 | 2025–26 | |
| 35 | Cova da Piedade | 1 | 31 | 28 | 8 | 7 | 13 | 31 | 40 | -9 | – | – | – | – | – | 2021–22 | 2021–22 | |
| 36 | Fontinhas | 1 | 30 | 28 | 7 | 9 | 12 | 28 | 43 | -15 | – | – | – | – | – | 2022–23 | 2022–23 | ^{[C]} |
| 37 | Lusitânia dos Açores | 1 | 23 | 28 | 4 | 11 | 13 | 25 | 42 | -17 | – | – | – | – | – | 2024–25 | 2024–25 | |
| 38 | Moncarapachense | 1 | 22 | 28 | 6 | 4 | 18 | 28 | 58 | -30 | – | – | – | – | – | 2022–23 | 2022–23 | |
| 39 | Vianense | 1 | 22 | 28 | 5 | 6 | 17 | 20 | 36 | -16 | – | – | – | – | – | 2023–24 | 2026–27 | |
| 40 | Oriental Dragon | 1 | 21 | 28 | 2 | 15 | 11 | 25 | 37 | -12 | – | – | – | – | – | 2021–22 | 2021–22 | ^{[D]} |
| 41 | Pêro Pinheiro | 1 | 21 | 28 | 5 | 4 | 19 | 24 | 57 | -33 | – | – | – | – | – | 2023–24 | 2023–24 | |
| 42 | Pevidém | 1 | 12 | 28 | 2 | 6 | 20 | 21 | 49 | -28 | – | – | – | – | – | 2021–22 | 2021–22 | |
| 43 | Leça | 0 | 0 | 0 | 0 | 0 | 0 | 0 | 0 | 0 | – | – | – | – | – | 2026–27 | 2026–27 | |
| 44 | Louletano | 0 | 0 | 0 | 0 | 0 | 0 | 0 | 0 | 0 | – | – | – | – | – | 2026–27 | 2026–27 | |
| 45 | Paços de Ferreira | 0 | 0 | 0 | 0 | 0 | 0 | 0 | 0 | 0 | – | – | – | – | – | 2026–27 | 2026–27 | |
| 46 | Vitória de Sernache | 0 | 0 | 0 | 0 | 0 | 0 | 0 | 0 | 0 | – | – | – | – | – | 2026–27 | 2026–27 | |

A. Was deducted 1 point in the 2022–23 season for financial irregularities.
B. Was deducted 3 points in the 2023–24 season for financial irregularities.
C. Club ended football team in 2024.
D. Club folded in 2024.

Last updated: 23 May 2026

| Primeira Liga |
| Liga Portugal 2 |
| Liga 3 |
| Campeonato de Portugal |
| Portuguese District Championships |
| Clubs no longer in competition |

== See also ==
- Portuguese Third Division, third tier of Portuguese football between 1948 and 1990
- Portuguese Second Division, third tier of Portuguese football between 1990 and 2013
- Campeonato de Portugal, third tier of Portuguese football between 2013 and 2021

Sporting positions
| Preceded by Campeonato de Portugal | Third tier of Portuguese football 2021– | Succeeded by Incumbent |
