= 2026–27 Amarante F.C. season =

Amarante
2026–27 season
- President: Ricardo Ribeiro
- Head coach: Jorge Pinto (until 12 October); Hélder Queirós (interim; 12–20 October); Renato Coimbra (from 20 October)
- Stadium: Estádio Municipal de Amarante
- Liga Portugal 2: 14th
- Taça de Portugal: Third round
- Top goalscorer: League: Mélvin; Simão Silva; Gonçalo Cunha (2 each); All: Simão Silva (4)
- Highest home attendance: 3,838 (v. Lusitânia Lourosa, 16 August 2026)
- Lowest home attendance: 1,593 (v. Portimonense, 10 October 2026)
- Average home league attendance: 2,592
- Biggest win: Ponte da Barca 0–2 Amarante (20 September 2026)
- Biggest defeat: Leixões 3–1 Amarante (6 September 2026)
Home colours	Away colours	Third colours

The 2026–27 season is the 104th season in the existence of Amarante Futebol Clube and its 93rd season since joining official competitions. It is the club's first season in professional football, its sixth in the second tier of Portuguese football and its first since 1988–89. Amarante competes in the Liga Portugal 2 and the Taça de Portugal.

== Background and pre-season ==
Amarante secured promotion to the Liga Portugal 2 on 10 May 2026, becoming the first team to achieve promotion from the 2025–26 Liga 3 championship phase. A 1–0 victory over União de Santarém confirmed the club's first-ever participation in professional competitions and its return to the second tier of Portuguese football for the first time since 1988–89.

Following promotion, the club began preparations for participation in professional football, including the establishment of a sports company. On 22 May 2026, members of Amarante approved the creation of a Sociedade Desportiva Unipessoal por Quotas (SDUQ), rather than a Sociedade Anónima Desportiva (SAD). The proposal received 252 votes in favour, 38 against and 10 abstentions, among 303 votes cast. The chosen structure would keep the senior football operation under the club's ownership and control.

On 1 July 2026, Amarante appointed Jorge Pinto as head coach for the 2026–27 season, replacing Alex Costa, who had led the club to promotion but opted not to continue. Pinto returned to Amarante after previously managing the club during the 2021–22 season, when it competed in the Campeonato de Portugal. The appointment marked his second experience in Liga Portugal 2, having begun the previous season as manager of U.D. Oliveirense. The squad underwent substantial changes ahead of the new campaign, with 20 players arriving and 18 departing during the summer transfer window.

Amarante played three friendly matches in preparation for its first professional campaign. It lost 2–1 away to Chaves on 22 July, defeated Oliveirense 1–0 on 25 July, and lost 2–0 away to Moreirense on 1 August.

== Season ==
=== August–October ===
Amarante made its debut in Liga Portugal 2 on 8 August 2026, away to Tondela. Despite taking the lead through Mélvin Costa in the 18th minute, the visitors lost 2–1 after goals from Cascavel and João Lima, the latter scoring from the penalty spot in first-half stoppage time. The club's preparations for professional football were still ongoing at the time of its debut. Amarante had registered only 20 players for the league and travelled to Tondela with five substitutes, just four of whom were outfield players. Pinto described the situation as "growing pains", explaining that the club had set a wage ceiling and was unwilling to recruit players who did not meet its requirements simply to increase squad numbers. He expected further players to be registered in the following week, although the squad was not yet complete.

Amarante subsequently lost at home to Lusitânia de Lourosa before earning its first point with a goalless draw away to Vizela. On 30 August, the club recorded its first victory in professional football, defeating Benfica B 1–0 at the Estádio Municipal de Amarante. Mélvin scored the only goal in the 15th minute, giving the club its first three points in the competition.

The team was unable to build on that result, losing 3–1 away to Leixões and drawing 2–2 at home against União de Leiria. During the subsequent break in the league schedule for international fixtures, Amarante played two further friendlies against Santa Clara and Vitória de Guimarães. The team lost 1–0 to Santa Clara on 30 September and 2–0 to Vitória on 2 October. The return of league competition followed with another defeat on 10 October, when Amarante lost 2–1 at home to Portimonense, despite scoring a late consolation goal through Gonçalo Cunha. After seven league matches, Amarante had recorded one win, two draws and four defeats, leaving it 16th in the table with five points.

Following the defeat to Portimonense, Jorge Pinto left the club on 12 October, bringing his second spell as Amarante manager to an end. He had returned at the beginning of the season after previously managing the club in 2021–22. His departure followed a run of three defeats and a draw in four league matches. Goalkeeping coach Hélder Queirós took charge on an interim basis for the club's subsequent Taça de Portugal match against Académica de Coimbra.

On 20 October, Amarante appointed Renato Coimbra as head coach. Coimbra returned to the club after previously managing it between 2022 and 2024, a period during which he led Amarante to the 2023–24 Campeonato de Portugal title and promotion to Liga 3. His first league match in charge ended in a 1–0 defeat away to Torreense on 26 October. Amarante ended October with a 2–1 home victory over Porto B on 31 October. Leandro Ferreira opened the scoring in the 21st minute before Rúdi Almeida secured the win with a goal in the final minute. The result was Amarante's second league victory of the season and lifted the club to 14th place with eight points after nine matches.

== Players ==
=== First-team squad ===
As of 6 September 2026

Note: Flags indicate national team as defined under FIFA eligibility rules; some limited exceptions apply. Players may hold more than one non-FIFA nationality.

No.	Pos.	Nation	Player
1	GK	POR	Rafael Flores
2	DF	POR	Gonçalo Cunha (on loan from Torreense)
3	DF	GBS	Feliciano
4	DF	POR	João Filipe (captain)
5	DF	POR	João Ricardo
6	MF	POR	Rodrigo Guedes
7	FW	POR	Leandro Ferreira (on loan from Louletano)
8	MF	BRA	Tokinho Dória
9	FW	POR	Cardoso
10	FW	POR	Mélvin Costa (on loan from Santa Clara)
11	DF	BRA	Alemão
12	DF	NGR	Lawrence Adeniyi
14	FW	NGR	Arome Idache
15	DF	POR	Rodrigo Beirão

No.	Pos.	Nation	Player
16	MF	POR	Rodrigo Carvalho
17	MF	POR	Rúben Silva
20	FW	POR	Luís Machado
23	FW	NGR	Kenneth Ikugar
26	MF	BFA	Faissal Zangré (on loan from Felgueiras)
28	DF	POR	Diogo Costa (on loan from Gil Vicente)
36	DF	BRA	Ian Custódio
51	GK	POR	Diogo Fernandes (on loan from Porto)
65	GK	POR	Didi
78	MF	POR	Simão Silva (on loan from Académico de Viseu)
85	MF	GBS	Nito Gomes
88	MF	POR	Rúben Alves
91	FW	POR	Rúdi Almeida (on loan from Famalicão)

== Transfers ==
=== In ===
No.	Pos	Player	Transferred from	Fee	Date	Source
Summer transfers
5	DF	(Portugal) João Ricardo	(Portugal) U. Santarém	Free	7 June 2026	
8	MF	(Brazil) Tokinho Dória	(Portugal) Lusitânia Lourosa	Free	17 June 2026	
65	GK	(Portugal) Didi	(Portugal) Felgueiras	Free	5 July 2026	
7	FW	(Portugal) Leandro Ferreira	(Portugal) Louletano	Loan	6 July 2026	
6	MF	(Portugal) Rodrigo Guedes	(Portugal) Académico de Viseu	Free	7 July 2026	
15	DF	(Portugal) Rodrigo Beirão	(Portugal) Vizela	Free	10 July 2026	
10	FW	(Portugal) Mélvin Costa	(Portugal) Santa Clara	Loan	14 July 2026	
2	DF	(Portugal) Gonçalo Cunha	(Portugal) Torreense	Loan	16 July 2026	
85	MF	(Guinea) Nito Gomes	(Portugal) Paços de Ferreira	Free	17 July 2026	
28	DF	(Portugal) Diogo Costa	(Portugal) Gil Vicente	Loan	18 July 2026	
26	MF	(Burkina Faso) Faissal Zangré	(Portugal) Felgueiras	Loan	1 August 2026	
11	DF	(Brazil) Alemão	(Armenia) Pyunik	Free	10 August 2026	
20	FW	(Portugal) Luís Machado	(Cyprus) Ethnikos Achna	Free	11 August 2026	
36	DF	(Brazil) Ian Custódio	(Portugal) Famalicão	Free	12 August 2026	
88	MF	(Portugal) Rúben Alves	(Portugal) Penafiel	Free	13 August 2026	
23	FW	(Nigeria) Kenneth Ikugar	(Lithuania) TransINVEST	Free	21 August 2026	
78	MF	(Portugal) Simão Silva	(Portugal) Académico de Viseu	Loan	27 August 2026	
51	GK	(Portugal) Diogo Fernandes	(Portugal) Porto	Loan	28 August 2026	
91	FW	(Portugal) Rúdi Almeida	(Portugal) Famalicão	Loan	4 September 2026	
16	MF	(Portugal) Rodrigo Carvalho	(Portugal) Vizela	Free	5 September 2026	
Disclosed total
€0

=== Out ===
No.	Pos	Player	Transferred to	Fee	Date	Source
Summer transfers
58	MF	(Portugal) Afonso Meireles	(Portugal) Vitória de Guimarães B	Loan return	End of 2025–26 season	
10	MF	(Portugal) Daniel Rodrigues	(Portugal) Paredes	Free	7 June 2026	
2	DF	(Portugal) Obama Ribeiro	(Portugal) Fafe	Free	22 June 2026	
23	FW	(United States) Jordan Saint-Louis	(Bulgaria) Dunav	Free	24 June 2026	
6	MF	(Portugal) Fernando Almeida	(Portugal) AFS	Free	24 June 2026	
20	MF	(Cape Verde) Marcelo Cunha	(Portugal) Varzim	Free	27 June 2026	
1	GK	(Portugal) Martim Duarte	(Portugal) Arouca	Free	30 June 2026	
8	MF	(Burkina Faso) Faissal Zangré	(Portugal) Felgueiras	Loan return	1 July 2026	
80	FW	(Portugal) Tiago Ventura	(Portugal) Felgueiras	Free	2 July 2026	
22	DF	(Portugal) Samuel Vivas	(Portugal) Felgueiras	Free	3 July 2026	
30	MF	(Portugal) Tiago Antunes	(Portugal) Salgueiros	Free	9 July 2026	
28	DF	(Portugal) Rui Pedro	(Spain) Pontevedra	Free	10 July 2026	
26	DF	(Portugal) Diogo Nascimento	(Portugal) Paços de Ferreira	Free	17 July 2026	
99	FW	(Brazil) Roger Almeida	(Portugal) Camacha	Free	17 July 2026	
17	MF	(Portugal) Gonçalo Sousa	(Portugal) Celoricense	Free	18 July 2026	
88	DF	(Portugal) Eduardo Aguiar	(Portugal) Vianense	Free	20 July 2026	
7	FW	(Portugal) Moisés Conceição	(Portugal) Vianense	Free	21 July 2026	
Disclosed total
€0

== Pre-season and friendlies ==
Win Draw Loss

22 July 2026 Friendly	Chaves (Portugal)	2–1	(Portugal) Amarante	Chaves, Portugal
	Marquinhos; Aarón Romero	Report	Rúben Silva	Stadium: Estádio Municipal Eng. Manuel Branco Teixeira

25 July 2026 Friendly	Oliveirense (Portugal)	0–1	(Portugal) Amarante	Oliveira de Azeméis, Portugal
		Report	João Filipe	Stadium: Estádio Carlos Osório

1 August 2026 Friendly	Moreirense (Portugal)	2–0	(Portugal) Amarante	Moreira de Cónegos, Portugal
	35' Yan Lincon (o.g.) Rodrigo Beirão	Report		Stadium: Parque de Jogos Comendador Joaquim de Almeida Freitas

30 September 2026 Friendly	Santa Clara (Portugal)	1–0	(Portugal) Amarante	Penafiel, Portugal
	75' Vasconcelos	Report

2 October 2026 Friendly	Vitória de Guimarães (Portugal)	2–0	(Portugal) Amarante	Guimarães, Portugal
	4' Mendes; 23' M. Nogueira	Report		Stadium: Academia Vitória SC; Attendance: 0

== Competitions ==
=== Overall record ===
Competition	First match	Last match	Starting round	Final position	Record							
Competition	First match	Last match	Starting round	Final position	Pld	W	D	L	GF	GA	GD	Win %
Liga Portugal 2	8 August 2026	16 May 2027	Matchday 1		9	2	2	5	8	12	−4	22.22
Taça de Portugal	20 September 2026	17 October 2026	Second round	Third round	2	1	0	1	4	3	+1	50.00
Total					11	3	2	6	12	15	−3	27.27

Last updated: 31 October 2026
Source: Soccerway

=== Liga Portugal 2 ===
==== League table ====
Pos	Team	Pld	W	D	L	GF	GA	GD	Pts	Promotion, qualification or relegation
12	Torreense	9	2	4	3	8	10	−2	10	
13	Leixões	9	3	1	5	10	14	−4	10	
14	Amarante	9	2	2	5	8	12	−4	8	
15	Chaves	9	2	2	5	9	18	−9	8	
16	Porto B (Note: Ineligible for promotion)	9	2	2	5	8	17	−9	8	Qualification for the Relegation play-off

Updated to match(es) played on 2 November 2026. Source: Liga Portugal
Rules for classification: 1) Points; 2) Head-to-head points; 3) Head-to-head goal difference; 4) Goal difference; 5) Matches won; 6) Goals scored; 7) Play-off.

==== Results summary ====
Overall								Home						Away					
Pld	W	D	L	GF	GA	GD	Pts	W	D	L	GF	GA	GD	W	D	L	GF	GA	GD
9	2	2	5	8	12	−4	8	2	1	2	6	6	0	0	1	3	2	6	−4

Source: Liga Portugal

==== Results by round ====
Round	1	2	3	4	5	6	7	8	9	10	11	12	13	14	15	16	17	18	19	20	21	22	23	24	25	26	27	28	29	30	31	32	33	34
Ground	A	H	A	H	A	H	H	A	H	A	H	A	H	A	H	A	H	H	A	H	A	H	A	A	H	A	H	A	H	A	H	A	H	A
Result	L	L	D	W	L	D	L	L	W																									
Position	11	15	16	13	15	15	16	17	14																									
Points	0	0	1	4	4	5	5	5	8																									

Source: Liga Portugal
A = Away; H = Home; W = Win; D = Draw; L = Loss
Notes:
- Positions show the situation at the end of the corresponding Game Weeks (GW), not the position at the conclusion of matches or game days.

==== Matches ====
8 August 2026 1	Tondela	2–1	Amarante	Tondela
18:00 WEST (UTC+1)	Cascavel 21'; Lima 45+1'	Report	18' Mélvin	Stadium: Estádio João Cardoso; Attendance: 2,077; Referee: Flávio Lima (Lisbon)

16 August 2026 2	Amarante	0–1	Lusitânia Lourosa	Amarante
14:00 WEST (UTC+1)		Report	29' Santos	Stadium: Estádio Municipal de Amarante; Attendance: 3,838; Referee: Diogo Araújo (Porto)

22 August 2026 3	Vizela	0–0	Amarante	Vizela
14:00 WEST (UTC+1)		Report		Stadium: Estádio do Futebol Clube de Vizela; Attendance: 1,651; Referee: Vítor Lopes (Viana do Castelo)

30 August 2026 4	Amarante	1–0	Benfica B	Amarante
11:00 WEST (UTC+1)	Mélvin 15'	Report		Stadium: Estádio Municipal de Amarante; Attendance: 3,534; Referee: Márcio Torres (Viana do Castelo)

6 September 2026 5	Leixões	3–1	Amarante	Matosinhos
15:30 WEST (UTC+1)	Cláudio 8'; Paraizo 45+7'; Róchez 52'	Report	64' Silva	Stadium: Estádio do Mar; Attendance: 3,910; Referee: Luís Filipe (Lisbon)

13 September 2026 6	Amarante	2–2	Leiria	Amarante
15:30 WEST (UTC+1)	Silva 45'; Cunha 82'	Report	51' Muñoz; 80' Matheus	Stadium: Estádio Municipal de Amarante; Attendance: 2,113; Referee: Anzhony Rodrigues (Madeira)

10 October 2026 7	Amarante	1–2	Portimonense	Amarante
15:00 WEST (UTC+1)	Cunha 90+5'	Report	65' Djassi; 75' Welinton Jr.	Stadium: Estádio Municipal de Amarante; Attendance: 1,593; Referee: Flávio Duarte (Lisbon)

26 October 2026 8	Torreense	1–0	Amarante	Torres Vedras
20:45 WEST (UTC+1)	Malik 9'	Report		Stadium: Estádio Manuel Marques; Attendance: 1,432; Referee: Miguel Fonseca (Porto)

31 October 2026 9	Amarante	2–1	Porto B	Amarante
11:00 WEST (UTC+1)	Ferreira 22'; Almeida 90'	Report	38' Rodrigues	Stadium: Estádio Municipal de Amarante; Attendance: 1,881; Referee: Daniel Pinto (Aveiro)

7 November 2026 10	Académica de Coimbra	v	Amarante	Coimbra
--:-- WEST (UTC+1)		Report		Stadium: Estádio Cidade de Coimbra

15 November 2026 11	Amarante	v	Felgueiras	Amarante
--:-- WEST (UTC+1)		Report		Stadium: Estádio Municipal de Amarante

30 November 2026 12	Sporting CP B	v	Amarante	Alcochete
--:-- WEST (UTC+1)		Report		Stadium: Estádio Aurélio Pereira

6 December 2026 13	Amarante	v	AFS	Amarante
--:-- WEST (UTC+1)		Report		Stadium: Estádio Municipal de Amarante

13 December 2026 14	Farense	v	Amarante	Faro
--:-- WEST (UTC+1)		Report		Stadium: Estádio de São Luís

20 December 2026 15	Amarante	v	Chaves	Amarante
--:-- WEST (UTC+1)		Report		Stadium: Estádio Municipal de Amarante

27 December 2026 16	Penafiel	v	Amarante	Penafiel
--:-- WEST (UTC+1)		Report		Stadium: Estádio Municipal 25 de Abril

10 January 2027 17	Amarante	v	Feirense	Amarante
--:-- WEST (UTC+1)		Report		Stadium: Estádio Municipal de Amarante

17 January 2027 18	Amarante	v	Tondela	Amarante
--:-- WEST (UTC+1)		Report		Stadium: Estádio Municipal de Amarante

24 January 2027 19	Lusitânia Lourosa	v	Amarante	Lourosa
--:-- WEST (UTC+1)		Report		Stadium: Estádio do Lusitânia de Lourosa FC

31 January 2027 20	Amarante	v	Vizela	Amarante
--:-- WEST (UTC+1)		Report		Stadium: Estádio Municipal de Amarante

7 February 2027 21	Benfica B	v	Amarante	Seixal
--:-- WEST (UTC+1)		Report		Stadium: Benfica Campus

14 February 2027 22	Amarante	v	Leixões	Amarante
--:-- WEST (UTC+1)		Report		Stadium: Estádio Municipal de Amarante

21 February 2027 23	Leiria	v	Amarante	Leiria
--:-- WEST (UTC+1)		Report		Stadium: Estádio Dr. Magalhães Pessoa

28 February 2027 24	Portimonense	v	Amarante	Portimão
--:-- WEST (UTC+1)		Report		Stadium: Estádio Municipal de Portimão

7 March 2027 25	Amarante	v	Torreense	Amarante
--:-- WEST (UTC+1)		Report		Stadium: Estádio Municipal de Amarante

14 March 2027 26	Porto B	v	Amarante	Vila Nova de Gaia
--:-- WEST (UTC+1)		Report		Stadium: Estádio Luis Filipe Menezes

21 March 2027 27	Amarante	v	Académica de Coimbra	Amarante
--:-- WEST (UTC+1)		Report		Stadium: Estádio Municipal de Amarante

4 April 2027 28	Felgueiras	v	Amarante	Felgueiras
--:-- WEST (UTC+1)		Report		Stadium: Estádio Dr. Machado de Matos

11 April 2027 29	Amarante	v	Sporting CP B	Amarante
--:-- WEST (UTC+1)		Report		Stadium: Estádio Municipal de Amarante

18 April 2027 30	AFS	v	Amarante	Aves
--:-- WEST (UTC+1)		Report		Stadium: Estádio do CD Aves

25 April 2027 31	Amarante	v	Farense	Amarante
--:-- WEST (UTC+1)		Report		Stadium: Estádio Municipal de Amarante

2 May 2027 32	Chaves	v	Amarante	Chaves
--:-- WEST (UTC+1)		Report		Stadium: Estádio Municipal Eng. Manuel Branco Teixeira

9 May 2027 33	Amarante	v	Penafiel	Amarante
--:-- WEST (UTC+1)		Report		Stadium: Estádio Municipal de Amarante

16 May 2027 34	Feirense	v	Amarante	Santa Maria da Feira
--:-- WEST (UTC+1)		Report		Stadium: Estádio Marcolino de Castro

=== Taça de Portugal ===
20 September 2026 Second round	Ponte da Barca	0–2	Amarante	Ponte da Barca
18:00 WEST (UTC+1)		Report	Mélvin 14' (pen.); Almeida 90+6'	Stadium: Estádio Municipal de Ponte da Barca; Referee: Diogo Araujo

17 October 2026 Third round	Académica de Coimbra	3–2	Amarante	Coimbra
20:15 WEST (UTC+1)	Cunha 25' (o.g.); Rodrigues 57'; Nunes 67'	Report	Silva 11'; Silva 54'	Stadium: Estádio Cidade de Coimbra; Attendance: 4,268; Referee: António Nobre (Leiria)

== Statistics ==
=== Appearances and goals ===
As of 31 October 2026

No.	Pos	Nat	Player	Total		Liga Portugal 2		Taça de Portugal	
No.	Pos	Nat	Player	Apps	Goals	Apps	Goals	Apps	Goals
Goalkeepers
1	GK	(Portugal) POR	Rafael Flores	0	0	0	0	0	0
51	GK	(Portugal) POR	Diogo Fernandes	2	0	0	0	2	0
65	GK	(Portugal) POR	Didi	9	0	9	0	0	0
Defenders
2	DF	(Portugal) POR	Gonçalo Cunha	8	2	7	2	1	0
3	DF	(Portugal) POR	Feliciano	10	0	9	0	1	0
4	DF	(Portugal) POR	João Filipe	9	0	7	0	2	0
5	DF	(Portugal) POR	João Ricardo	11	0	8+1	0	2	0
11	DF	(Brazil) BRA	Alemão	2	0	2	0	0	0
12	DF	(Nigeria) NGR	Lawrence Adeniyi	0	0	0	0	0	0
15	DF	(Portugal) POR	Rodrigo Beirão	5	0	3+1	0	1	0
28	DF	(Portugal) POR	Diogo Costa	10	0	7+1	0	2	0
36	DF	(Brazil) BRA	Ian Custódio	7	0	1+5	0	1	0
Midfielders
6	MF	(Portugal) POR	Rodrigo Guedes	4	0	0+3	0	0+1	0
8	MF	(Brazil) BRA	Tokinho Dória	11	0	8+1	0	2	0
16	MF	(Portugal) POR	Rodrigo Carvalho	0	0	0	0	0	0
17	DF	(Portugal) POR	Rúben Silva	1	0	0+1	0	0	0
26	MF	(Burkina Faso) BFA	Faissal Zangré	11	0	8+1	0	1+1	0
78	MF	(Portugal) POR	Simão Silva	7	4	4+2	2	1	2
85	MF	(Guinea-Bissau) GBS	Nito Gomes	10	0	7+1	0	2	0
88	MF	(Portugal) POR	Rúben Alves	9	0	2+5	0	2	0
Forwards
7	FW	(Portugal) POR	Leandro Ferreira	6	1	3+2	1	0+1	0
9	FW	(Portugal) POR	Cardoso	1	0	0+1	0	0	0
10	FW	(Portugal) POR	Mélvin Costa	7	3	6	2	1	1
14	FW	(Nigeria) NGR	Arome Idache	11	0	2+7	0	2	0
20	FW	(Portugal) POR	Luís Machado	8	0	5+1	0	1+1	0
23	FW	(Nigeria) NGR	Kenneth Ikugar	3	0	0+2	0	1	0
91	FW	(Portugal) POR	Rúdi Almeida	6	2	1+3	1	1+1	1
Players who made an appearance but left the team.
