= 2025–26 Liga Portugal 2 =

Portuguese football season

Liga Portugal 2
- Season: 2025–26
- Dates: 10 August 2025 – 17 May 2026
- Champions: Marítimo
- Promoted: Académico de Viseu; Marítimo
- Relegated: Oliveirense; Paços de Ferreira
- Europa League: Torreense (via Taça de Portugal)
- Matches: 306
- Goals: 748 (2.44 per match)
- Top goalscorer: André Clóvis (23 goals)
- All statistics correct as of 17 May 2026.

The 2025–26 Liga Portugal 2 (also known as Liga Portugal 2 Meu Super for sponsorship reasons) was the 36th season of Portuguese football's second-tier league and the sixth season under the current Liga Portugal 2 title.

== Overview ==
=== Promotion and relegation (pre-season) ===
18 teams are competing in this division, including three reserve sides from top-flight Primeira Liga teams – fifteen teams from previous season, one team relegated from Primeira Liga and two teams promoted from Liga 3.

==== Teams promoted to Primeira Liga ====
Tondela and Alverca secure promotion to Primeira Liga following the results of their respective matches on 17 May 2025. Tondela beat União de Leiria and Alverca beat Portimonense. Tondela promoted after three seasons in second division while Alverca successfully achieved a second consecutive promotion after one season in the second division.

==== Teams relegated from Primeira Liga ====
Farense were relegated on 17 May 2025 with suffered a defeat to Santa Clara and return to second division after spending two seasons in top division.

==== Teams promoted from Liga 3 ====
Lusitânia Lourosa became the first team to be promoted on 3 May 2025 by defeating 1º Dezembro in matchweek 12 of the promotion phase. The result saw them play in the second division for the first time in their history.

Sporting CP B became the second team to be promoted on 17 May 2025 by defeating Amarante in matchweek 14 of the promotion phase. The result saw them return to the second division after a seven-season absence.

==== Teams relegated to Liga 3 ====
Mafra were relegated on 3 May 2025 after suffering a defeat to Leixões and the result ended their time in the second division for five seasons.

=== Result from play-off ===
Vizela failed to gain promotion to the Primeira Liga and remained in the second division for the season after losing 2-5 on aggregate to AVS and Paços de Ferreira managed to retain their place in the second division after beating Belenenses 3-2 on aggregate in a two-legged promotion and relegation play-off.

=== Reprived team ===
Oliveirense, who finished 17th last season and should have been relegated managed to secure a place in the second division as a result of Boavista being demoted to the fifth division due to failing to register by the deadline set by the league operator.

== Teams ==
=== Changes ===
The following teams changed division since the 2024–25 season.

To Liga Portugal 2
▼ Relegated from Primeira Liga
- Farense
▲ Promoted from Liga 3
- Lusitânia Lourosa
- Sporting CP B

From Liga Portugal 2
▲ Promoted to Primeira Liga
- Tondela
- Alverca
▼ Relegated to Liga 3
- Mafra

=== Location and stadiums ===
Locations of teams in the 2025–26 Liga Portugal 2.
Locations of teams in the 2025–26 Liga Portugal 2 from Madeira.

Team	Location	Stadium	Capacity	2024–25 season
Académico de Viseu	Viseu	Estádio Municipal do Fontelo	6,912	10th in LP 2
Benfica B	Seixal	Benfica Campus - Campo n.° 1	2,644	4th in LP 2
Chaves	Chaves	Estádio Municipal Eng.° Manuel Branco Teixeira	8,400	7th in LP 2
Farense^{↓}	Faro	Estádio de São Luís	7,000	17th in PL
Feirense	Santa Maria da Feira	Estádio Marcolino Castro	5,401	8th in LP 2
Felgueiras	Felgueiras	Estádio Dr. Machado de Matos	7,540	9th in LP 2
Leixões	Matosinhos	Estádio do Mar	6,000	13th in LP 2
Lusitânia Lourosa^{↑}	Lourosa	Estádio do Lusitânia de Lourosa FC	4,900	1st in Liga 3
Marítimo	Funchal	Estádio do Marítimo	10,600	12th in LP 2
Oliveirense	Oliveira de Azeméis	Estádio Carlos Osório	1,750	17th in LP 2
Paços de Ferreira	Paços de Ferreira	Estádio Capital do Móvel	9,076	16th in LP 2
Penafiel	Penafiel	Estádio Municipal 25 de Abril	5,230	11th in LP 2
Portimonense	Portimão	Estádio Municipal de Portimão	5,050	15th in LP 2
Porto B	Vila Nova de Gaia	Estádio Luís Filipe Menezes	3,800	14th in LP 2
Sporting CP B^{↑}	Alcochete	Estádio Aurélio Pereira	1,180	2nd in Liga 3
Torreense	Torres Vedras	Estádio Manuel Marques	2,431	5th in LP 2
União de Leiria	Leiria	Estádio Dr. Magalhães Pessoa	23,888	6th in LP 2
Vizela	Vizela	Estádio do Futebol Clube de Vizela	6,000	3rd in LP 2

^{↓}	Relegated from the Primeira Liga
^{↑}	Promoted from the Liga 3

League notes:
- PL: Primeira Liga
- LP 2: Liga Portugal

=== Personnel and kits ===
Note: Flags indicate national team as has been defined under FIFA eligibility rules. Players and coaches may hold more than one non-FIFA nationality.

Team	Manager	Captain	Kit manufacturer	Main kit sponsor	Other kit sponsor(s)
Académico de Viseu	(Portugal national football team) Sérgio Fonseca	(Portugal national football team) Luís Silva	(Spain) Joma		List: Front: None; Back: None; Sleeves: None; Shorts: None
Benfica B	(Portugal national football team) Nélson Veríssimo	(Portugal national football team) Diogo Prioste	(Germany) Adidas		List: Front: None; Back: None; Sleeves: None; Shorts: None
Chaves	(Portugal national football team) Vítor Martins	(Portugal national football team) Carraça	(Portugal) Lacatoni		List: Front: None; Back: None; Sleeves: None; Shorts: None
Farense	(Portugal national football team) José Faria	(Portugal national football team) Marco Matias	(Portugal) Lacatoni		List: Front: None; Back: None; Sleeves: None; Shorts: None
Feirense	(Portugal national football team) Ricardo Costa	(Portugal national football team) Tiago Ribeiro	(Spain) Kelme		List: Front: None; Back: None; Sleeves: None; Shorts: None
Felgueiras	(Portugal national football team) Rui Ferreira	(Portugal national football team) Landinho	(Spain) G Sport		List: Front: None; Back: None; Sleeves: None; Shorts: None
Leixões	(Portugal national football team) Carlos Fangueiro	(Serbia national football team) Igor Stefanovic	(England) Umbro		List: Front: None; Back: None; Sleeves: None; Shorts: None
Lusitânia Lourosa	(Portugal national football team) Pedro Miguel	(Portugal national football team) Silvério	(Germany) Adidas		List: Front: None; Back: None; Sleeves: None; Shorts: None
Marítimo	(Portugal national football team) Miguel Moita	(Portugal national football team) Romain Correia	(Germany) Puma		List: Front: None; Back: None; Sleeves: None; Shorts: None
Oliveirense	(Portugal national football team) Ricardo Silva	(Brazil national football team) Filipe Alves	(Portugal) Lacatoni		List: Front: None; Back: None; Sleeves: None; Shorts: None
Paços de Ferreira	(Portugal national football team) Nuno Braga	(Portugal national football team) Tiago Ferreira	(Spain) Joma		List: Front: None; Back: None; Sleeves: None; Shorts: None
Penafiel	(Spain national football team) José Manuel Aira	(Portugal national football team) João Miguel	(Italy) Macron		List: Front: None; Back: None; Sleeves: None; Shorts: None
Portimonense	(Portugal national football team) Tiago Fernandes	(Portugal national football team) João Reis	(England) Umbro		List: Front: None; Back: None; Sleeves: None; Shorts: None
Porto B	(Portugal national football team) João Brandão	(Portugal national football team) João Costa	(United States) New Balance		List: Front: None; Back: None; Sleeves: None; Shorts: None
Sporting CP B	(Portugal national football team) João Gião	(Portugal national football team) Manuel Mendonça	(United States) Nike		List: Front: None; Back: None; Sleeves: None; Shorts: None
Torreense	(Portugal national football team) Luís Tralhão	(Cape Verde national football team) Stopira	(England) Umbro		List: Front: None; Back: None; Sleeves: None; Shorts: None
União de Leiria	(Portugal national football team) Fábio Pereira	(Portugal national football team) Diogo Amado	(Spain) CDT		List: Front: None; Back: None; Sleeves: None; Shorts: None
Vizela	(Venezuela national football team) Ronald Molina	(Portugal national football team) Jota Gonçalves	(Italy) Kappa		List: Front: None; Back: None; Sleeves: None; Shorts: None

=== Managerial changes ===
==== Pre-season ====
Team	Outgoing manager	Manner of departure	Date of vacancy	Replaced by	Date of appointment
Marítimo	(Portugal) Ivo Vieira	End of contract	8 May 2025	(Portugal) Vítor Matos	7 June 2025
Farense	(Portugal) Tozé Marreco	Mutual termination	29 May 2025	(Portugal) Silas	18 June 2025
Portimonense	(Portugal) Ricardo Pessoa	End of contract	30 June 2025	(Portugal) Tiago Fernandes	1 July 2025
Torreense	(Portugal) Tiago Fernandes	End of contract	15 May 2025	(Portugal) Vítor Martins	1 July 2025
Oliveirense	(Portugal) António Torres Campos	End of contract	30 June 2025	(Portugal) Jorge Pinto	3 July 2025
União de Leiria	(Portugal) Silas	Signed by Farense	18 June 2025		

==== During the season ====
Team	Outgoing manager	Manner of departure	Date of vacancy	Week	Position in table	Replaced by	Date of appointment
Marítimo	(Portugal) Vítor Matos	Signed by Swansea City	24 November 2025	11	3rd	(Portugal) Miguel Moita	25 November 2025

== Standings ==
=== League table ===
Pos	Team	Pld	W	D	L	GF	GA	GD	Pts	Promotion, qualification or relegation
1	Marítimo (C, P)	34	20	6	8	50	29	+21	66	Promotion to the Primeira Liga
2	Académico de Viseu (P)	34	17	8	9	58	33	+25	59 (Note: Head-to-head points: Académico de Viseu 3, Torreense 3; Head-to-head goal difference: Académico de Viseu 0, Torreense 0; Goal difference: Académico de Viseu +25, Torreense +13.)	Promotion to the Primeira Liga
3	Torreense	34	18	5	11	46	33	+13	59	Qualification for the Promotion play-offs and Europa League league phase (Note: Torreense qualified for the Europa League league phase as the 2025–26 Taça de Portugal winners.)
4	Vizela	34	14	9	11	39	40	−1	51 (Note: Head-to-head points: Vizela 3, Porto B 3; Head-to-head goal difference: Vizela +3, Porto B -3.)	
5	Porto B (Note: Ineligible for promotion)	34	15	6	13	41	42	−1	51	
6	União de Leiria	34	13	11	10	52	46	+6	50 (Note: Head-to-head points: União de Leiria 3, Leixões 3; Head-to-head goal difference: União de Leiria +1, Leixões -1.)	
7	Leixões	34	15	5	14	46	55	−9	50	
8	Feirense	34	12	10	12	37	40	−3	46	
9	Chaves	34	13	6	15	42	40	+2	45	
10	Benfica B	34	11	11	12	43	44	−1	44 (Note: Head-to-head points: Benfica B 3, Felgueiras 3; Head-to-head goal difference: Benfica B +1, Felgueiras -1.)	
11	Felgueiras	34	11	11	12	34	38	−4	44	
12	Lusitânia Lourosa	34	11	10	13	44	52	−8	43	
13	Sporting CP B	34	13	3	18	41	34	+7	42	
14	Penafiel	34	11	8	15	37	39	−2	41	
15	Portimonense	34	11	7	16	39	49	−10	40 (Note: Head-to-head points: Portimonense 6, Farense 0.)	
16	Farense (O)	34	10	10	14	31	37	−6	40	Qualification for the Relegation play-off
17	Paços de Ferreira (R)	34	9	12	13	34	48	−14	39	Relegation to the Liga 3
18	Oliveirense (R)	34	8	10	16	34	49	−15	34	Relegation to the Liga 3

Source: Liga Portugal 2
Rules for classification: 1) Points; 2) Head-to-head points; 3) Head-to-head goal difference; 4) Goal difference; 5) Matches won; 6) Goals scored; 7) Play-off.
(C) Champions; (O) Play-off winners; (P) Promoted; (R) Relegated

=== Position by round ===
Team ╲ Round	1	2	3	4	5	6	7	8	9	10	11	12	13	14	15	16	17	18	19	20	21	22	23	24	25	26	27	28	29	30	31	32	33	34
Académico de Viseu	13	13	15	12	14	14	15	11	7	6	6	3	3	3	3	3	2	2	2	2	2	2	2	2	2	2	2	2	2	2	2	2	2	2
Benfica B	9	11	13	15	15	16	17	17	13	15	18	17	12	15	12	8	10	7	9	12	11	9	10	10	9	11	9	8	8	8	11	8	9	10
Chaves	7	10	12	9	7	5	4	5	5	8	8	7	4	4	6	4	4	5	7	9	10	13	11	12	10	9	10	11	10	11	10	11	11	9
Farense	8	16	10	14	10	13	9	8	9	7	7	8	8	9	10	12	13	13	16	17	16	17	17	15	15	16	16	17	15	15	15	14	15	16
Feirense	11	3	8	4	5	8	11	14	10	12	11	11	13	10	14	11	11	10	8	8	9	6	9	9	11	10	11	10	9	9	8	6	8	8
Felgueiras	18	18	17	13	9	12	8	7	8	10	13	14	16	14	11	10	9	11	11	10	12	12	13	13	14	13	13	13	14	13	13	13	14	11
Leixões	1	4	2	5	8	11	14	10	15	17	9	12	15	12	16	17	18	15	17	16	14	11	12	11	12	12	12	12	12	10	6	9	7	7
Lusitânia Lourosa	5	5	6	11	13	7	10	13	14	16	16	10	9	8	8	7	7	9	10	7	6	7	6	8	7	8	8	9	11	12	7	10	10	12
Marítimo	16	8	4	3	3	2	3	4	6	4	3	2	2	2	1	1	1	1	1	1	1	1	1	1	1	1	1	1	1	1	1	1	1	1
Oliveirense	10	12	7	10	12	10	13	16	11	13	12	9	11	16	13	15	17	17	14	14	13	15	15	16	17	17	18	18	18	18	18	18	18	18
Paços de Ferreira	14	14	14	16	16	17	16	15	17	11	15	15	17	17	17	16	14	16	13	15	18	18	18	17	16	14	14	15	16	16	16	17	17	17
Penafiel	15	15	16	17	17	15	12	12	16	9	10	13	10	13	9	14	16	18	18	18	17	14	14	14	13	15	15	14	13	14	14	15	13	14
Portimonense	4	9	11	7	11	6	7	9	12	14	14	16	18	18	18	18	15	12	15	13	15	16	16	18	18	18	17	16	17	17	17	16	16	15
Porto B	12	17	18	18	18	18	18	18	18	18	17	18	14	11	15	13	12	14	12	11	7	8	7	5	8	6	7	6	6	6	9	7	6	5
Sporting CP B	6	2	5	2	1	3	1	1	1	1	1	1	1	1	2	2	3	3	3	3	3	3	3	4	6	7	6	7	7	7	12	12	12	13
Torreense	17	6	3	8	6	9	6	3	2	2	2	5	7	7	7	9	8	6	4	5	4	4	4	6	4	3	3	3	3	3	3	3	3	3
União de Leiria	2	7	9	6	4	4	5	6	4	3	5	6	6	6	5	6	6	8	6	4	5	5	5	3	3	4	4	4	4	4	4	4	5	6
Vizela	3	1	1	1	2	1	2	2	3	5	4	4	5	5	4	5	5	4	5	6	8	10	8	7	5	5	5	5	5	5	5	5	4	4

Promotion to the Primeira Liga
Qualification for the Promotion play-off
Qualification for the Relegation play-off
Relegation to the Liga 3

Source: Liga Portugal 2

== Results ==
=== Fixtures and results ===
Home \ Away	AVF	SLB	GDC	SCF	CDF	FLG	LSC	LLF	CSM	UDO	FPF	PEN	PSC	FCP	SCP	SCU	UDL	FCV
Académico de Viseu		1–2	1–0	3–0	3–0	0–1	3–1	3–2	3–1	4–1	0–0	2–0	2–3	2–0	0–0	1–0	2–0	0–0
Benfica B	0–2		1–0	1–0	3–0	4–2	1–1	1–2	1–2	2–0	2–1	0–2	1–2	1–1	1–0	3–3	2–2	1–2
Chaves	1–0	1–1		2–0	1–1	1–1	1–2	2–2	2–3	2–1	2–0	0–1	0–1	0–1	0–0	2–0	0–2	1–0
Farense	0–0	4–3	0–2		0–1	0–0	1–2	2–1	0–2	0–0	1–1	0–0	0–1	2–3	2–1	0–3	0–1	2–0
Feirense	0–0	0–2	1–0	0–0		0–0	2–0	1–2	1–1	1–2	0–1	1–0	4–1	2–1	1–2	0–0	2–2	1–0
Felgueiras	1–3	2–1	1–0	1–1	2–0		0–1	3–1	0–1	1–0	0–0	0–0	1–1	2–0	0–2	0–3	2–1	0–1
Leixões	1–5	0–0	0–1	0–2	2–1	3–0		2–1	1–4	2–0	3–2	3–2	2–0	2–4	0–4	1–0	1–4	1–2
Lusitânia Lourosa	0–3	1–1	2–2	1–2	1–0	2–1	2–2		0–4	0–1	2–0	0–0	3–2	1–1	1–0	1–2	1–1	1–1
Marítimo	2–2	1–1	1–3	0–1	1–0	1–1	3–2	0–1		1–0	2–0	2–1	1–0	2–1	1–0	2–0	1–3	1–1
Oliveirense	2–2	3–0	2–3	1–1	3–4	1–5	2–0	0–0	0–2		2–2	2–1	1–2	1–0	1–0	0–3	2–4	3–0
Paços de Ferreira	2–1	1–0	4–3	0–0	1–2	1–1	3–1	1–5	0–0	0–0		2–1	4–1	2–2	0–3	0–0	0–0	1–2
Penafiel	4–3	1–1	0–2	1–1	1–2	2–0	0–0	2–0	1–0	0–0	1–2		0–2	3–0	1–1	1–0	1–0	0–1
Portimonense	0–1	1–1	3–2	1–0	0–1	0–0	1–2	3–2	0–2	1–1	2–3	2–1		2–1	1–2	0–1	1–1	1–1
Porto B	3–1	2–0	3–0	0–2	0–0	1–0	0–3	1–2	1–0	0–0	1–0	1–0	1–0		2–1	2–3	1–2	1–0
Sporting CP B	1–2	0–1	0–1	3–1	3–2	0–1	0–1	4–0	0–1	2–0	3–0	1–2	4–3	0–1		1–2	1–0	0–1
Torreense	2–1	1–0	0–2	2–1	2–3	2–0	1–1	0–1	1–0	3–2	0–0	3–2	1–0	0–3	0–1		3–1	4–0
União de Leiria	3–2	2–2	2–1	0–3	2–2	2–3	1–3	0–0	1–2	0–0	2–0	4–2	1–0	2–2	3–1	1–0		2–2
Vizela	0–0	1–2	3–2	0–2	1–1	2–2	2–0	4–3	0–3	1–0	3–0	1–3	1–1	4–0	1–0	0–1	1–0	

Source: Liga Portugal 2
Legend: Blue = home team win; Yellow = draw; Red = away team win.
For upcoming matches, an "a" indicates there is an article about the rivalry between the two participants.

=== Results by round ===
Team ╲ Round	1	2	3	4	5	6	7	8	9	10	11	12	13	14	15	16	17	18	19	20	21	22	23	24	25	26	27	28	29	30	31	32	33	34
Académico de Viseu	L	D	L	W	D	L	D	W	W	W	W	W	D	W	D	L	W	W	L	W	L	W	W	W	L	W	W	L	L	W	D	D	W	D
Benfica B	D	D	D	L	L	D	L	W	W	L	L	D	W	D	W	W	D	W	D	L	D	W	L	D	W	L	W	W	D	L	L	W	L	L
Chaves	D	D	D	W	D	W	W	L	L	L	W	D	W	W	W	L	L	L	D	L	L	L	W	L	W	W	L	L	W	L	W	L	L	W
Farense	D	L	W	L	W	L	W	D	W	D	D	L	W	L	L	D	L	D	L	L	W	L	L	W	D	D	L	L	W	W	D	W	D	L
Feirense	D	W	L	W	D	L	L	W	L	L	D	D	D	W	L	D	W	W	W	D	L	W	L	D	L	W	L	W	W	L	D	W	L	D
Felgueiras	L	L	D	W	W	L	W	D	L	L	D	D	L	W	W	W	D	L	D	W	L	L	D	D	L	D	L	W	D	W	W	L	D	W
Leixões	W	D	W	L	L	L	L	W	L	L	W	L	L	L	W	L	D	W	D	D	W	W	L	W	L	L	W	D	W	W	W	L	W	W
Lusitânia Lourosa	W	D	D	L	D	W	L	L	D	L	D	W	W	W	L	W	D	L	D	W	W	L	W	L	W	L	L	D	D	L	W	D	L	L
Marítimo	L	W	W	W	D	W	D	L	L	W	W	W	W	W	D	W	W	W	D	D	L	W	W	L	W	W	W	D	W	L	W	W	L	L
Oliveirense	D	D	W	L	D	D	D	L	W	L	D	W	L	L	W	L	L	D	W	L	W	L	L	D	L	D	L	L	L	W	L	D	W	L
Paços de Ferreira	L	D	D	L	D	D	D	W	L	W	L	D	L	L	W	D	W	L	W	L	D	L	D	W	W	L	L	D	D	W	L	L	D	W
Penafiel	L	D	L	L	D	W	W	L	D	W	D	L	L	W	L	W	L	L	L	D	W	W	D	D	D	L	L	W	W	L	W	L	W	L
Portimonense	W	L	D	W	L	W	D	L	L	D	L	L	L	L	W	W	D	W	L	D	D	L	L	L	L	L	W	W	L	W	L	W	D	W
Porto B	D	L	L	L	L	D	L	W	L	W	W	L	W	W	L	D	W	L	W	W	W	D	W	W	L	D	L	W	D	L	L	W	W	W
Sporting CP B	W	W	L	W	W	L	W	W	W	D	D	W	W	L	L	L	L	L	L	W	W	W	L	L	L	L	W	L	L	L	L	L	L	D
Torreense	L	W	W	L	D	D	W	W	W	W	L	L	L	L	L	L	W	W	W	L	W	D	W	L	W	W	W	D	L	W	D	W	W	W
União de Leiria	W	L	D	W	W	D	D	L	W	W	D	D	L	L	W	D	L	D	W	L	D	W	W	W	L	W	W	D	D	W	L	L	L	D
Vizela	W	W	D	W	D	W	L	D	D	L	W	D	L	W	D	L	W	D	L	D	L	L	W	W	W	W	W	L	L	L	W	D	W	L

Source: Liga Portugal 2

== Relegation play-off ==
The 16th-placed team (Farense) faces the 3rd-placed team of the Liga 3 (Belenenses) for the final place in the 2026–27 Liga Portugal 2.

=== Summary ===
Team 1	Agg.	Team 2	1st leg	2nd leg
Farense	1–0	Belenenses	1–0	0–0

=== Matches ===
First leg

23 May 2026	Farense	1–0	Belenenses	Faro
20:30 UTC+1	Candeias 30'			Stadium: Estádio de São Luís

Second leg

30 May 2026	Belenenses	0–0	Farense	Lisbon
20:30 UTC+1				Stadium: Estádio do Restelo

== Attendances ==
=== Overall ===
Pos	Team	Total	High	Low	Average	Change
1	Académico de Viseu	0	0	0	0	n/a
2	Benfica B	0	0	0	0	n/a
3	Chaves	0	0	0	0	n/a
4	Farense	0	0	0	0	n/a^{†}
5	Feirense	0	0	0	0	n/a
6	Felgueiras	0	0	0	0	n/a
7	Leixões	0	0	0	0	n/a
8	Lusitânia Lourosa	0	0	0	0	n/a^{‡}
9	Marítimo	0	0	0	0	n/a
10	Oliveirense	0	0	0	0	n/a
11	Paços de Ferreira	0	0	0	0	n/a
12	Penafiel	0	0	0	0	n/a
13	Portimonense	0	0	0	0	n/a
14	Porto B	0	0	0	0	n/a
15	Sporting CP B	0	0	0	0	n/a^{‡}
16	Torreense	0	0	0	0	n/a
17	União de Leiria	0	0	0	0	n/a
18	Vizela	0	0	0	0	n/a
	League total	0	0	0	0	n/a

Source: Liga Portugal 2
Notes:
^{†} Teams played previous season in Primeira Liga
^{‡} Teams played previous season in Liga 3

=== Home match played ===
As of future

Team \ Match played	1	2	3	4	5	6	7	8	9	10	11	12	13	14	15	16	17	Total
Académico de Viseu	2,765	1,820	1,363	671	1,589	874	1,571	3,691	1,434	1,634	1,799	5,236	2,953	6,312	4,828	5,850	6,384	50,774
Benfica B	852	1,020	569	522	351	763	683	1,259	1,280	980	395	817	456	994	890	2,231	1,664	15,726
Chaves	3,689	2,819	1,515	2,085	1,258	855	1,312	1,115	1,352	748	627	1,098	0	0	911	922	773	21,079
Farense	1,838	1,807	2,149	1,769	2,971	2,229	1,406	1,402	1,337	1,853	1,782	1,603	2,020	1,570	2,091	2,197	4,071	34,095
Feirense	1,422	2,329	3,503	1,477	890	1,091	1,168	1,133	1,345	1,561	1,062	1,114	1,617	1,623	1,464	1,191	1,524	25,514
Felgueiras	1,580	1,890	1,759	1,510	1,180	700	670	1,080	1,300	1,025	850	1,430	2,190	1,210	2,455	1,840	1,325	23,994
Leixões	3,152	3,114	2,557	3,212	2,987	2,987	1,675	1,432	1,765	1,876	1,853	1,852	1,832	2,517	2,031	1,182	4,213	40,237
Lusitânia Lourosa	2,288	2,710	1,081	1,062	498	73	845	1,042	635	1,248	666	1,892	914	1,061	550	1,242	1,165	18,972
Marítimo	8,148	7,483	7,504	6,726	6,210	7,308	5,989	7,655	5,114	8,728	7,298	9,034	9,255	7,817	8,827	10,023	7,058	130,177
Oliveirense	304	804	810	910	621	1,285	651	408	1,004	619	399	820	351	1,088	1,219	841	519	12,653
Paços de Ferreira	2,755	1,873	1,606	1,353	1,477	2,988	1,989	2,071	892	1,246	1,329	2,579	2,132	2,216	1,952	1,833	4,121	34,412
Penafiel	1,010	932	981	762	753	268	1,597	2,099	727	681	1,262	2,030	1,368	1,510	1,213	2,300	1,837	21,330
Portimonense	1,807	1,995	1,489	1,232	747	680	644	548	848	696	677	1,075	691	775	911	1,246	3,656	19,717
Porto B	868	525	443	449	547	379	988	275	872	204	479	624	424	579	588	466	549	9,259
Sporting CP B	625	433	515	410	296	506	424	574	315	272	486	461	388	350	237	684	451	7,427
Torreense	1,367	1,163	993	735	1,312	1,483	625	1,011	708	948	1,513	1,427	1,614	1,083	2,068	1,607	2,088	21,745
União de Leiria	7,138	8,320	5,127	2,124	4,320	10,738	1,109	1,109	1,612	375	1,168	1,782	782	434	5,247	6,346	1,278	59,009
Vizela	2,275	2,438	1,980	2,331	1,694	1,992	1,565	1,357	1,523	1,383	1,592	1,783	2,427	1,631	1,647	2,143	1,332	31,093
League total																		577,213

Source: Liga Portugal 2

== Number of teams by district ==
Rank	District Football Associations	Number	Teams
1	Porto	5	Felgueiras, Leixões, Paços de Ferreira, Penafiel and Porto B
2	Aveiro	3	Feirense, Lusitânia Lourosa, and Oliveirense
2	Lisbon	3	Benfica B, Sporting CP B and Torreense
4	Algarve	2	Farense and Portimonense
5	Braga	1	Vizela
5	Leiria	1	União de Leiria
5	Madeira	1	Marítimo
5	Vila Real	1	Chaves
5	Viseu	1	Académico de Viseu

== See also ==
- 2025–26 Primeira Liga
- 2025–26 Liga 3
- 2025–26 Campeonato de Portugal
- 2025–26 Taça da Liga
- 2025–26 Taça de Portugal
