= Vlad (footballer) =

Portuguese footballer (born 2009)

Personal information
- Full name: Vladimir Henrique Silva
- Date of birth: 19 March 2009 (age 17)
- Place of birth: Bissau, Guinea-Bissau
- Height: 1.75 m (5 ft 9 in)
- Position: Winger

Team information
- Current team: Celta B (on loan from Paços Ferreira)
- Number: 28

Youth career
- 2021–2025: Paços Ferreira

Senior career*
| Years | Team | Apps | (Gls) |
| 2025– | Paços Ferreira | 26 | (1) |
| 2026– | → Celta B (loan) | 6 | (0) |
| 2026– | → Celta (loan) | 0 | (0) |

International career
| 2025– | Portugal U17 | 12 | (2) |
- * Club domestic league appearances and goals as of 7 November 2026

Vladimir Henrique Silva (born 19 March 2009), commonly known as Vlad, is a professional footballer who plays as a winger for Segunda División club Celta Fortuna, on loan from Paços de Ferreira. Born in Guinea-Bissau, he represents Portugal at youth international level.

== Club career ==
Born in Bissau, Vlad moved to Portugal at early age and joined Paços de Ferreira's youth sides in 2021, aged 12. He played with the under-19 squad in the 2024–25, aged 15, and signed his first professional contract with the club on 6 August 2025.

Vlad made his professional debut on 9 August 2025, starting in a 2–1 home loss to Vizela. Regularly used, he scored his first goal on 18 April 2026, netting his side's third in a 4–3 home win over Chaves.

On 4 August 2026, after suffering relegation, Vlad was loaned to Celta de Vigo, being initially assigned to the reserves in Segunda División. He made his first team debut on 13 November, coming on as a second-half substitute for Hugo González in a 5–0 away routing of Salamanca CF UDS, for the season's Copa del Rey.

== International career ==
Eligible to play for Guinea-Bissau and Portugal, Vlad was called up to the latter's under-17 team in October 2025.
