= Nuno Braga =

Portuguese football manager (born 1988)

Personal information
- Full name: Nuno Ribeiro Ramos Braga
- Date of birth: 24 November 1988 (age 37)

Managerial career
- Years: Team
- 2018–2019: Aliados Lordelo
- 2025–2026: Paços de Ferreira

Nuno Ribeiro Ramos Braga (born 24 November 1988) is a Portuguese football manager.

== Career ==
Braga was a youth team manager at Porto, Rio Ave and Leixões. In 2018–19, he managed a senior team for the first time, Aliados Lordelo in the Porto Football Association's district leagues. He was subsequently under-23 manager at Vizela and Académico de Viseu.

On 12 December 2025, 37-year-old Braga was appointed for the first time to the first team of a professional club, being hired at Paços de Ferreira. He succeeded Filipe Cândido at the team who were second-from-bottom after 13 games, and he signed a contract until the end of the season with the option of one more. His debut two days later was a 5–1 home loss to Lusitânia Lourosa. The club ended the season relegated to Liga 3, their first time in the third tier since 1974. On 25 June 2026, having won seven of 21 games, his contract was not renewed.
