= Diogo Costa (disambiguation) =

Diogo Costa (Diogo Meireles da Costa, born 1999) is a Portuguese footballer.

Diego Costa may also refer to:

- Diogo Costa (footballer, born May 2003) (Diogo Miguel Pereira Costa), Portuguese football defender.
- Diogo Costa (footballer, born July 2003) (Diogo Filipe Pinto Costa), Portuguese football full-back.
- Diogo Costa (sailor) (Diogo Eurico Vaz de Bacelar da Fonseca e Costa, born 1997), Portuguese sailor.
- Diogo Pinto (footballer, born 1999) (Diogo Costa Pinto), Portuguese football midfielder.

== See also ==
- Diogo (footballer, born 1988) (Diogo da Costa Oliveira), Portuguese football full-back and winger.
- Diego Costa (born 1988), former professional footballer.
