= Tiago Cerveira =

Portuguese footballer (born 1992)

Personal information
- Full name: Tiago Ramos Cerveira
- Date of birth: 7 July 1992 (age 34)
- Place of birth: Coimbra, Portugal
- Height: 1.73 m (5 ft 8 in)
- Position: Left-back

Team information
- Current team: Paços de Ferreira
- Number: 29

Youth career
- 2000–2003: Mealhada
- 2003–2005: Academica
- 2005–2009: Sporting
- 2009–2011: Academica

Senior career*
Years	Team	Apps	(Gls)
2011–2012	Sertanense	18	(2)
2012–2013	Naval	4	(0)
2013–2014	Atlético	15	(0)
2014–2015	Cinfães	13	(2)
2015	Lusitano Vildemoínhos	12	(0)
2015–2016	Tirsense	29	(3)
2016–2017	Salgueiros	32	(1)
2017–2018	Vilafranquense	24	(0)
2018–2019	União Leiria	34	(2)
2019–2023	Varzim	76	(2)
2023–2026	Lusitânia	60	(0)
2026–	Paços de Ferreira	5	(0)
- * Club domestic league appearances and goals as of 13 September 2026

Tiago Ramos Cerveira (born 7 July 1992) is a Portuguese professional footballer who plays as a left-back for Liga 3 club Paços de Ferreira.

== Football career ==
Born in Coimbra, Cerveira spent most of his youth career with hometown club Académica de Coimbra, with four years at Sporting CP in between. He began his senior career in the third tier with Sertanense F.C. in 2011–12, and in July 2012 he signed a two-year deal with Associação Naval 1º de Maio of the Segunda Liga. On 23 January 2013, he made his professional debut against S.L. Benfica B and played 75 minutes.

For 2013–14, after Naval were relegated for administrative reasons, Cerveira joined Atlético C.P. who met the same fate. He then returned to the third tier, playing regularly in one-season spells at C.D. Cinfães, Lusitano FCV, F.C. Tirsense, S.C. Salgueiros, U.D. Vilafranquense and U.D. Leiria. With the last of these, he lost on penalties to former club Vilafranquense in the 2019 playoffs.

Cerveira returned to the professional game in June 2019, signing a two-year deal with Varzim S.C. of the second tier. In his second match on 18 August, he scored his first goal at the level, to equalise in a 1–1 draw at FC Porto B. On 1 September, both he and teammate Alan Henrique were given straight red cards in added time at the end of a 3–1 loss at G.D. Estoril-Praia.

On 28 June 2023, Cerveira signed a one-year contract with Liga 3 club Lusitânia de Lourosa.
