= Marco Sousa =

Portuguese footballer

Personal information
- Full name: Marco Aurélio Ribeiro Sousa
- Date of birth: 29 January 1995 (age 31)
- Place of birth: Porto, Portugal
- Height: 1.85 m (6 ft 1 in)
- Position: Goalkeeper

Team information
- Current team: Lusitânia
- Number: 23

Youth career
- 2008–2013: Salgueiros 08
- 2013–2014: Paços Ferreira

Senior career*
Years	Team	Apps	(Gls)
2013	Salgueiros 08	1	(0)
2014–2020	Paços Ferreira	2	(0)
2016–2017	→ Gondomar (loan)	4	(0)
2020–2022	Paredes	25	(0)
2022–	Lusitânia	4	(0)
- * Club domestic league appearances and goals as of 25 June 2025

Marco Aurélio Ribeiro Sousa (born 29 January 1995 in Porto) is a Portuguese professional footballer who plays as a goalkeeper for Liga Portugal 2 club Lusitânia.
