= Jorge Miguel =

Portuguese footballer

Personal information
- Full name: Jorge Miguel Machado Almeida
- Date of birth: 22 September 1990 (age 36)
- Place of birth: Vila Nova de Famalicão, Portugal
- Height: 1.76 m (5 ft 9 1/2 in)
- Position: Defender

Team information
- Current team: Paredes

Youth career
- 2003–2009: Famalicão

Senior career*
Years	Team	Apps	(Gls)
2009–2019	Famalicão	129	(1)
2012–2013	→ Lousada (loan)	31	(0)
2019–2021	Académico Viseu	40	(1)
2021–2022	Lusitânia	21	(0)
2022–2024	Fafe	45	(1)
2024–	Paredes	9	(1)
- * Club domestic league appearances and goals as of 10 November 2024

Jorge Miguel Machado Almeida, known as Jorge Miguel (born 22 September 1990) is a Portuguese footballer who plays for Paredes as a defender.

== Football career ==
On 16 September 2015, Jorge Miguel made his professional debut with Famalicão in a 2015–16 Segunda Liga match against Oliveirense.

On 16 July 2021, he signed with Lusitânia.
