= Sérgio Gaminha =

Portuguese football manager (born 1980)

Personal information
- Full name: Sérgio Miguel Seiça Rebelo Ferreira Gaminha
- Date of birth: 12 November 1980 (age 45)
- Place of birth: Coimbra, Portugal
- Position: Midfielder

Youth career
- 1990–1999: Académica

Senior career*
Years	Team	Apps	(Gls)
1999–2000	Mealhada		
2000–2001	Febres		
2001–2004	Académica SF		

Managerial career
- 2004–2005: Académica SF
- 2006–2007: Académica SF
- 2014–2016: Sertanense
- 2018: Sertanense
- 2018–2019: BC Branco
- 2019: Loures
- 2023: Oliveira Hospital
- 2024: Tondela
- 2024–2025: Sertanense
- * Club domestic league appearances and goals

Sérgio Miguel Seiça Rebelo Ferreira Gaminha (born 12 November 1980) is a Portuguese football manager. His career was spent mostly as an assistant or in the lower leagues, with a brief spell at Tondela in Liga Portugal 2 in 2024.

== Career ==
In June 2016, after two years as manager of Sertanense FC, Gaminha was hired as Costinha's assistant at Académica de Coimbra. He had worked alongside the former Portugal international at S.C. Beira-Mar and F.C. Paços de Ferreira, and in April 2017, he briefly filled in for him at Académica.

Following a brief return to Sertanense, Gaminha was hired by Sport Benfica e Castelo Branco in May 2018. On 1 October 2023, he left Liga 3 side F.C. Oliveira do Hospital, who were in 7th place after nine games.

On 10 April 2024, Gaminha joined Liga Portugal 2 club C.D. Tondela for the rest of the season. He had been an assistant manager at the club from 2020 to 2022, under Pako Ayestarán and Natxo González. Three days later, he lost 1–0 on his debut at home to F.C. Penafiel; his six games were all defeats except one draw and a 1–0 win at AVS Futebol SAD on the final day.

For the 2024–25 season, Gaminha signed for Sertanense in the Campeonato de Portugal. He left on 22 January with the team second from bottom, having won once and drawn eight times in 15 games.
