= António Amaral =

Portuguese footballer and manager

Personal information
- Full name: António Jorge Rodrigues Amaral
- Date of birth: 20 June 1955 (age 71)
- Place of birth: Lisbon, Portugal
- Height: 1.99 m (6 ft 6 1/2 in)
- Position: Goalkeeper

Youth career
- 1970–1971: Dramático Cascais
- 1971–1974: Benfica

Senior career*
Years	Team	Apps	(Gls)
1975–1976	Sintrense		
1976–1979	Marítimo	18	(0)
1979–1982	Vitória Setúbal	56	(0)
1982–1984	Porto	13	(0)
1984–1985	Farense	30	(0)
1985–1987	Porto	0	(0)
1987–1989	Penafiel	42	(0)
1989–1990	Varzim	34	(0)
1990–1991	Águeda	21	(0)
1991–1993	Louletano	22	(0)
1993–1994	Tirsense	0	(0)
Total		236	(0)

International career
1981	Portugal	2	(0)

Managerial career
- 1995–1996: Vizela
- 1997–1998: Penafiel
- 1998: Maia
- 1998–1999: Feirense
- 1999–2000: Oriental
- 2000: Paredes
- 2001: Vila Real
- 2001–2002: Bragança
- 2002–2003: Penafiel
- 2004–2005: Chaves
- 2005–2006: Lousada
- 2006: South China
- 2007: Maia
- 2007–2008: Lousada
- 2009: Amarante
- * Club domestic league appearances and goals

António Jorge Rodrigues Amaral (born 20 June 1955 in Lisbon) is a Portuguese former football goalkeeper and manager.
