= Gabriel Souza =

Brazilian footballer (born 1997)

Personal information
- Full name: Gabriel Eugénio Souza
- Date of birth: 1 January 1997 (age 29)
- Place of birth: São Paulo, Brazil
- Height: 1.93 m (6 ft 4 in)
- Position: Goalkeeper

Team information
- Current team: Lusitânia Lourosa
- Number: 1

Youth career
- 2014: Paulista
- 2014: Ribeirão

Senior career*
Years	Team	Apps	(Gls)
2015	Ribeirão	2	(0)
2016–2018	CA Diadema		
2016–2018	→ Famalicão (loan)	35	(0)
2018–2021	Famalicão	1	(0)
2020–2021	→ Beira-Mar (loan)	14	(0)
2021–2023	Sanjoanense	8	(0)
2023–2024	Fafe	19	(0)
2024–2026	Tondela	0	(0)
2026–	Lusitânia Lourosa	0	(0)
- * Club domestic league appearances and goals as of 14 September 2026

Gabriel Eugénio Souza (born 1 January 1997), known as Gabriel Souza, Gabriel or simply Gabi, is a Brazilian professional footballer who plays as a goalkeeper for Liga Portugal 2 club Lusitânia Lourosa.

== Club career ==
He made his professional debut in the Segunda Liga for Famalicão on 9 October 2016 in a game against Sporting Covilhã.
