= Nito Gomes =

Bissau-Guinean association football player

Personal information
- Full name: Fernando de Lacerda Gomes
- Date of birth: 3 February 2002 (age 24)
- Place of birth: Bissau, Guinea-Bissau
- Height: 1.84 m (6 ft 0 in)
- Position: Centre-back

Team information
- Current team: Paços de Ferreira
- Number: 19

Youth career
- 2018–2020: Academia Vitalaise

Senior career*
Years	Team	Apps	(Gls)
2020	Benfica Bissau	1	(2)
2020–2021	Talavera B	5	(0)
2021–2022	Trujillo	4	(0)
2022–2025	Marítimo B	45	(1)
2023–2025	Marítimo	2	(0)
2025–2026	Paços de Ferreira	22	(0)
2026–	Amarante	3	(0)

International career^{‡}
2020	Guinea-Bissau U20	4	(0)
2023–	Guinea-Bissau	1	(1)
- * Club domestic league appearances and goals as of 29 August 2026 ‡ National team caps and goals as of 22:10, 11 September 2023 (UTC)

Fernando "Nito" de Lacerda Gomes (born 3 February 2002) is a Bissau-Guinean footballer who plays as a centre-back for Liga Portugal 2 club Amarante and the Guinea-Bissau national team.

== Professional career ==
Gomes began his senior career with the reserves of the Spanish club Talavera in 2021, followed by a stint with Trujillo in the Tercera División. He transferred to Marítimo B side on 23 October 2022. He was promoted to their senior team on 19 January 2023. He made his professional debut with Marítimo a couple of days later as a late substitute in a 1–0 Primeira Liga win over Estoril on 22 January 2023.

On 15 July 2025, Nito signed a two-season contract with Paços de Ferreira.

== International career ==
Gomes represented the Guinea-Bissau U20s at the 2020 WAFU Zone B U-20 Tournament. He was called up to the senior Guinea-Bissau national team for a set of 2023 Africa Cup of Nations qualification matches in September 2023.
