= Paulinho (footballer, born August 2000) =

Portuguese footballer

Paulité
Personal information
- Full name: Paulo Miguel Gomes Ferreira
- Date of birth: 24 August 2000 (age 26)
- Place of birth: Lisbon, Portugal
- Height: 1.69 m (5 ft 7 in)
- Position: Winger

Team information
- Current team: Lusitânia Lourosa
- Number: 21

Youth career
- 2005–2007: EAS Alta de Lisboa
- 2007–2010: Benfica
- 2010–2011: CAC
- 2011–2012: Águias Musgueira
- 2012–2014: Sacavenense
- 2014–2016: CAC
- 2016–2017: Académica
- 2017–2018: Sacavenense
- 2018–2019: Marítimo
- 2019–2020: Vitória Guimarães
- 2020: Estoril

Senior career*
Years	Team	Apps	(Gls)
2020–2021	Estoril	3	(0)
2021–2022	Grasshoppers	0	(0)
2022–2023	Felgueiras 1932	36	(6)
2023–2026	Leixões	76	(9)
2026–	Lusitânia Lourosa	6	(0)

International career
2019	Portugal U20	2	(0)
- * Club domestic league appearances and goals as of 14 September 2026

Paulo Miguel Gomes Ferreira (born 24 August 2000) known as Paulité, is a Portuguese footballer who plays as a winger for Liga Portugal 2 club Lusitânia Lourosa.

== Football career ==
He made his professional debut for Estoril on 10 September 2020 in the Liga Portugal 2.
