= Renato Coimbra =

Portuguese football manager

Personal information
- Full name: Renato Júlio Pinto Coimbra
- Date of birth: 1 August 1976 (age 50)
- Place of birth: Amarante, Portugal

Team information
- Current team: Amarante

Managerial career
- Years: Team
- 2010–2011: Mondinense
- 2011–2014: Padronelo
- 2014–2015: Vila Caiz
- 2015–2017: Baião
- 2017–2019: Vila Caiz
- 2019–2022: Alpendorada
- 2022–2024: Amarante
- 2024: Lusitânia Lourosa
- 2024–2026: Trofense
- 2026–: Amarante

Renato Coimbra (born 1 August 1976) is a Portuguese football manager who manages Amarante.

== Coaching career ==
Coimbra began his coaching career at Mondinense, later working at Padronelo, Vila Caiz and Baião. In 2019, he joined Alpendorada, where he spent four seasons and won the Porto Football Association's top district tier Divisão de Elite, securing promotion to the Campeonato de Portugal.

Coimbra was appointed manager of Amarante in 2022. In the 2023–24 season, he led the club to the Campeonato de Portugal title and promotion to Liga 3. On 10 June 2024, Amarante defeated Vitória de Setúbal 3–0 in the championship final at the Estádio Nacional. He left the club that June and was appointed manager of Lusitânia Lourosa on 15 June.

After five matches with Lusitânia Lourosa, Coimbra took charge of Trofense in October 2024. He remained at the club through the 2025–26 season, guiding the team to the promotion phase of Liga 3.

On 20 October 2026, Coimbra returned to Amarante as manager, succeeding Jorge Pinto. The appointment marked his first managerial role in Liga Portugal 2.

== Honours ==
=== Manager ===
Amarante

- Campeonato de Portugal: 2023–24

Alpendorada

- AF Porto - Divisão de Elite: 2021–22
