= Miguel Moita =

Portuguese football manager

Personal information
- Full name: Miguel Ribeiro Moita
- Date of birth: 7 August 1983 (age 43)
- Place of birth: Vieira do Minho, Portugal

Managerial career
- Years: Team
- 2008–2009: Chaves (assistant)
- 2009–2011: Beira-Mar (assistant)
- 2011–2012: Braga (assistant)
- 2013–2014: Sporting CP (assistant)
- 2014–2018: Monaco (assistant)
- 2019: Monaco (assistant)
- 2021–2022: Al Hilal (assistant)
- 2022–2023: Shabab Al Ahli (assistant)
- 2023–2024: Al-Rayyan (assistant)
- 2025–2026: Marítimo

Miguel Ribeiro Moita (born 7 August 1983) is a Portuguese football manager.

== Career ==
Born in Vieira do Minho in the Braga District, Moita graduated in physical education from the University of Porto. From 2008 to 2024, he was part of the coaching staff of Leonardo Jardim at G.D. Chaves, S.C. Beira-Mar, S.C. Braga, Olympiacos FC, Sporting CP, AS Monaco FC, Al Hilal SFC, Shabab Al Ahli Club and Al-Rayyan SC.

In January 2025, Moita told Mais Futebol that he was planning on becoming a head coach. On 25 November 2025, after Vítor Matos departed for Swansea City, Moita was given his first such job, at C.S. Marítimo of Liga Portugal 2. He signed until the end of the season with the option of one more, and had a release clause of €2 million. Eight people made up his coaching staff, including former club captain Edgar Costa. He made his debut five days later in a 2–0 win away to Portimonense S.C. to put his club level on points with Sporting CP B at the top of the table.

After a winning start - the best by a Marítimo coach in the 21st century - he also won the “Coach of the Month” award for January 2026. On 26 April of the same year, he secured promotion to the Primeira Liga with Marítimo after a 2–1 away victory over S.L. Benfica B, but still departed the club by mutual consent on 18 May 2026.
