= Kenneth Ikugar =

Nigerian footballer

Personal information
- Full name: Kenneth Tig - Ishor Ikugar
- Date of birth: 27 October 2000 (age 26)
- Place of birth: Calabar, Nigeria
- Height: 1.93 m (6 ft 4 in)
- Position: Forward

Team information
- Current team: Sigma Olomouc B
- Number: 99

Senior career*
Years	Team	Apps	(Gls)
–2016	Pythagorean FC		
2016–2020	FootyFanz United		
2021	Ústí nad Labem	7	(0)
2022–2023	Spartak Trnava	0	(0)
2022	→ Trebišov (loan)	17	(5)
2023	→ Zlaté Moravce (loan)	14	(1)
2024	Zlín	14	(1)
2024–2025	Sigma Olomouc B	17	(2)
2025	TransINVEST	8	(1)
2026–	Amarante	0	(0)
- * Club domestic league appearances and goals as of 29 August 2026

Kenneth Tig - Ishor Ikugar (born 27 October 2000) is a Nigerian professional footballer who plays as a forward for Liga Portugal 2 club Amarante.

== Club career ==
=== FC ViOn Zlaté Moravce ===
Ikugar made his professional Fortuna Liga debut for FC ViOn Zlaté Moravce against FK Železiarne Podbrezová on 11 February 2023.

=== SK Sigma Olomouc ===
On 4 July 2024, Ikugar signed a contract with Czech First League club Sigma Olomouc. He started playing for the reserve B team playing in Czech National Football League.
