= Diogo Fernandes (Portuguese footballer) =

Portuguese footballer (born 2005)

Personal information
- Full name: Diogo Dias Fernandes
- Date of birth: 17 February 2005 (age 21)
- Place of birth: Braga, Portugal
- Height: 1.85 m (6 ft 1 in)
- Position: Goalkeeper

Team information
- Current team: Amarante (on loan from Porto B)
- Number: 51

Youth career
- 2013–2014: Adaúfe
- 2014–2018: Braga
- 2018–2024: Porto

Senior career*
Years	Team	Apps	(Gls)
2024–	Porto B	26	(0)
2026–	→ Amarante (loan)	0	(0)

International career^{‡}
2021	Portugal U16	2	(0)
2021–2022	Portugal U17	14	(0)
2022–2023	Portugal U18	8	(0)
2023–2024	Portugal U19	4	(0)
2023–	Portugal U20	8	(0)
- * Club domestic league appearances and goals as of 15:37, 19 December 2025 (UTC) ‡ National team caps and goals as of 16:37, 2 July 2026 (UTC)

Diogo Dias Fernandes (born 17 February 2005) is a Portuguese footballer who plays as a goalkeeper for Amarante, on loan from Porto B.

== Club career ==
Born in Braga, Fernandes played as a youth for G.D. Adaúfe and S.C. Braga before joining Porto's academy in 2018. In July 2021, after completing a season in the under-17 team, he signed his first professional contract, of three years' length; in April 2024, his deal was extended to 2028.

In the 2023–24 edition of the UEFA Youth League, Porto reached the semi-finals. Fernandes received praise in the Portuguese media for saving two shots in the penalty shootout that decide the last-16 tie after a 1–1 draw away to reigning champions AZ Alkmaar in the Netherlands.

On 24 February 2024, Fernandes made his senior debut in Liga Portugal 2, a 2–0 home loss for Porto B to nearby Leixões. First-team manager Martín Anselmi called him up in the 28-man squad for the 2025 FIFA Club World Cup in the United States.

On 28 August 2026, Fernandes was loaned to Amarante, in the same division.

== International career ==
Fernandes made his international debut for the Portugal under-16 team on 5 June 2021, a 1–1 friendly draw with Denmark. He played for the under-17 team at the 2022 UEFA European Under-17 Championship in Israel, where they were eliminated from the semi-finals by France in a penalty shootout. In October 2025, he was called up for the first time to the under-21 team by Luís Freire.
