= Ricardo Silva (football manager) =

Portuguese football manager (born 1982)

Personal information
- Full name: Ricardo Salvador Macedo e Silva
- Date of birth: 3 June 1982 (age 44)
- Place of birth: Guimarães, Portugal

Team information
- Current team: Lusitânia Lourosa

Managerial career
- Years: Team
- 2009–2011: Caçadores das Taipas
- 2011–2012: Torcatense
- 2014: Vianense
- 2015–2016: Pedras Salgadas
- 2016–2017: Felgueiras
- 2017–2019: Pedras Salgadas
- 2019–2021: Fafe
- 2021–2023: Vilaverdense
- 2023–2025: Paços de Ferreira
- 2026: Oliveirense
- 2026–: Lusitânia Lourosa

Ricardo Salvador Macedo e Silva (born 3 June 1982) is a Portuguese football manager. He is the manager of Liga Portugal 2 club Lusitânia Lourosa, and has also managed Paços de Ferreira and Oliveirense in the same league. At Vilaverdense, he achieved two consecutive promotions from the fourth to second tiers.

== Career ==
Born in Guimarães, Silva won the Braga Football Association district title in 2009–10, with Clube Caçadores das Taipas. He was hired at AD Fafe in the then third-tier Campeonato de Portugal in 2019, and was dismissed on 9 February 2021 with the team in fourth place.

In June 2021, Silva was hired at Vilaverdense F.C. in the same division, albeit now the fourth tier. He achieved two consecutive promotions, taking the club to Liga Portugal 2. In the Taça de Portugal in 2022–23, his team reached the last 16, eliminating 7th-placed Primeira Liga club Portimonense S.C. in the third round.

Silva moved to F.C. Paços de Ferreira in Liga Portugal 2 in June 2023. He finished fifth in his first season, and left by mutual accord on 14 January 2025 with the club in 15th.

On 21 February 2026, Silva returned to the second tier, at 15th-placed U.D. Oliveirense. He oversaw the last 11 games of the season, as the club from Oliveira de Azeméis were relegated to Liga 3; his last game was a 5–1 home loss to his former club F.C. Felgueiras.

Silva remained in the same league for the 2026–27 season, being hired at Lusitânia Lourosa, who had finished 12th the season before. He won five and drew the other of his first six games, as his team became the last to remain unbeaten.
