= Ronald Molina =

Venezuelan football manager (born 1989)

Personal information
- Full name: Ronald Steve Ramírez Molina
- Date of birth: 29 December 1989
- Place of birth: Mérida, Venezuela
- Position: Midfielder

Team information
- Current team: Vizela (manager)

Senior career*
Years	Team	Apps	(Gls)
2008–2012	Estudiantes de Mérida	75	(5)
2013	Trujillanos	18	(4)
2014–2016	Deportivo Anzoátegui		
2015	→ Estudiantes de Mérida (loan)		
2016	Atlético Los Andes		
2017	Boyacá Chicó		
2017–2019	Operário	40	(1)
2019	Carvalhais	6	(0)
2020	ULA		

Managerial career
- 2026–: Vizela
- * Club domestic league appearances and goals

Ronald Steve Ramírez Molina (born 29 December 1989), known in Portugal as Ronald Molina, is a Venezuelan football manager and former player. He is the manager of Vizela in Liga Portugal 2.

== Playing career ==
Born in Mérida, Molina played as a midfielder for Estudiantes de Mérida, Trujillanos and Deportivo Anzoátegui in the Liga FUTVE. In June 2015, he played in pre-season with Boyacá Chicó of Colombia, and joined the Categoría Primera B club in January 2017.

== Managerial career ==
Molina joined Vizela in 2022, and was assistant manager and under-23 manager. On 17 February 2026, he was appointed interim manager in place of Nuno Silva, with reports that José Mota would come in permanently. His debut three days later was a 2–1 win away to Leixões. He was voted the league's Manager of the Month for March, having won all three fixtures. Having taken the team from 10th to 4th with seven wins and a draw in the last 12 games of the season, he was retained.
