= Ian Custódio =

Brazilian footballer

Personal information
- Full name: Ian Custódio dos Anjos
- Date of birth: 16 April 2003 (age 23)
- Place of birth: São Paulo, Brazil
- Height: 1.80 m (5 ft 11 in)
- Position: Left-back

Team information
- Current team: Famalicão U-23

Youth career
- 2014–2015: Portuguesa
- 2015–2023: Palmeiras

Senior career*
| Years | Team | Apps | (Gls) |
| 2023–2024 | Palmeiras | 1 | (0) |
| 2024–2026 | Famalicão | 0 | (0) |
| 2026– | Amarante | 1 | (0) |
- * Club domestic league appearances and goals as of 29 August 2026

Ian Custódio dos Anjos (born 16 April 2003), known as Ian Custódio or just Ian, is a Brazilian professional footballer who plays as a left-back for the Liga Portugal 2 club Amarante.

== Career ==
Ian was born in São Paulo, and joined Palmeiras' youth setup in 2015, from Portuguesa. In April 2023, he started to feature regularly in first team trainings, due to the injury of Joaquín Piquerez.

Ian made his first team debut for Verdão on 5 April 2023, coming on as a late substitute for fellow youth graduate Kaiky Naves in a 3–1 away loss to Bolívar, for the year's Copa Libertadores. On 7 August, he renewed his contract until 2025.

On 31 January 2024, Ian moved to Portugal, signing a three-and-a-half-year contract with Primeira Liga club Famalicão.

== Career statistics ==
As of 30 October 2023.

Appearances and goals by club, season and competition
| Club | Season | League | | | State league | | Cup | | Continental | | Other | | Total | |
| Club | Season | Division | Apps | Goals | Apps | Goals | Apps | Goals | Apps | Goals | Apps | Goals | Apps | Goals |
|---|---|---|---|---|---|---|---|---|---|---|---|---|---|---|
| Palmeiras | 2023 | Série A | 1 | 0 | — | | 0 | 0 | 1 (Note: Appearance(s) in Copa Libertadores) | 0 | — | | 2 | 0 |
| Career total | | | 1 | 0 | 0 | 0 | 0 | 0 | 1 | 0 | 0 | 0 | 2 | 0 |

== Honours ==
Palmeiras

- Copa São Paulo de Futebol Júnior: 2022, 2023
