= Luccas Paraizo =

Brazilian footballer

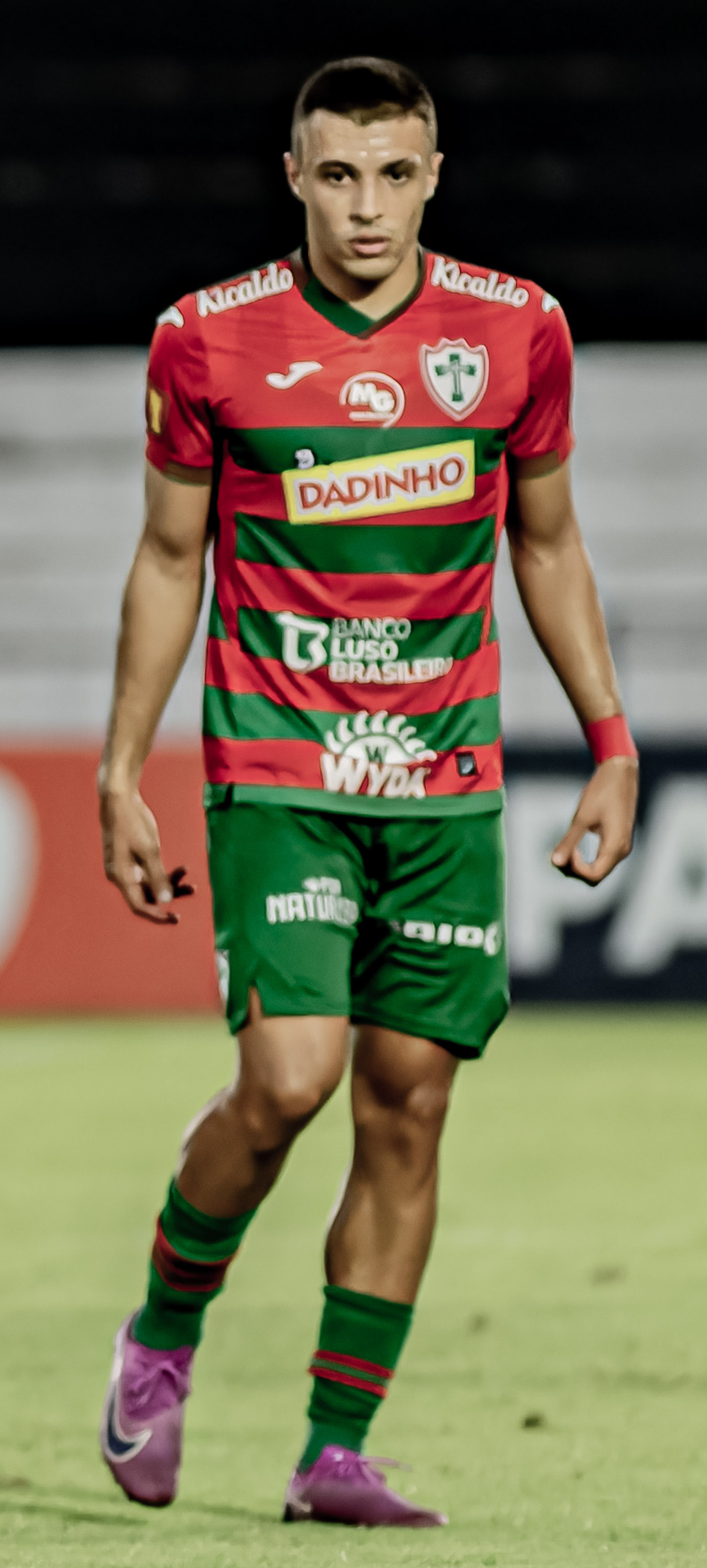
- Paraizo with Portuguesa in 2024

Personal information
- Full name: Luccas Paraizo Feitosa
- Date of birth: 5 July 2002 (age 24)
- Place of birth: São Paulo, Brazil
- Height: 1.78 m (5 ft 10 in)
- Position: Forward

Team information
- Current team: Leixões
- Number: 33

Youth career
- 2018–2022: Noroeste
- 2022: → Matonense (loan)
- 2022: Portuguesa

Senior career*
Years	Team	Apps	(Gls)
2021–2022	Noroeste	4	(0)
2022–2024	Portuguesa	23	(2)
2024–2025	Guarani	15	(2)
2024–2025	→ Torreense (loan)	10	(1)
2025–2026	Maccabi Netanya	9	(1)
2026–	Leixões	16	(7)
- * Club domestic league appearances and goals as of 11 September 2026

Luccas Paraizo Feitosa (born 5 July 2002), known as Luccas Paraizo or just Paraizo, is a Brazilian footballer who plays as a forward for Liga Portugal 2 club Leixões.

== Club career ==
=== Noroeste ===
Born in São Paulo, Paraizo moved to Americana when his mother emigrated to Germany. He began his career with Noroeste in 2018, and was also approved on a trial at SV Sandhausen in the following year, when visiting his mother; the move, however, did not came true.

After progressing through the youth setup, Paraizo signed his first professional contract with Noroeste on 21 January 2021, and made his senior debut on 7 March of that year, coming on as a second-half substitute in a 2–1 Campeonato Paulista Série A3 away win over Bandeirante.

Paraizo scored his first senior goal on 12 October 2021, netting the winner in a 1–0 home success over Rio Claro, for the year's Copa Paulista. In November, he was loaned to the under-20 side of Matonense for the 2022 Copa São Paulo de Futebol Júnior.

=== Portuguesa ===
In April 2022, Paraizo joined Portuguesa, being initially assigned to the under-20s. He renewed his contract with the club until November 2024 on 23 June, and made his debut for the club on 3 July, in a 1–0 Copa Paulista home loss against Água Santa.

Paraizo finished the 2022 Campeonato Paulista Sub-20 as the top scorer with 22 goals in 25 matches, and was definitely promoted to the main squad for the 2023 campaign. He scored his first goal for Lusa on 21 January of that year, netting his side's second in a 3–0 home win over Red Bull Bragantino.

On 18 January 2024, Paraizo renewed his contract with Portuguesa until 2026.

=== Guarani ===
On 18 April 2024, Série B side Guarani announced the signing of Paraizo on a contract until December 2027.

On 28 August 2024, Paraizo joined Liga Portugal 2 club Torreense on a season-long loan deal with the option to buy.

== Career statistics ==
As of 6 June 2026

Club	Season	League			State League		Cup		Continental		Other		Total	
Club	Season	Division	Apps	Goals	Apps	Goals	Apps	Goals	Apps	Goals	Apps	Goals	Apps	Goals
Noroeste	2021	Paulista A3	—		4	0	—		—		5 (Note: Appearance(s) in Copa Paulista)	1	9	1
Portuguesa	2022	Paulista A2	—		0	0	—		—		3	0	3	0
Portuguesa	2023	Paulista	—		13	2	—		—		8	1	21	3
Portuguesa	2024	Paulista	—		10	0	—		—		—		10	0
Portuguesa	Total		—		23	2	—		—		11	1	34	3
Guarani	2024	Série B	0	0	—		—		—		—		0	0
Career total			0	0	27	2	0	0	0	0	16	2	43	4

== Honours ==
=== Individual ===
- Campeonato Paulista Sub-20 top scorer: 2022
