= Rúben Alves =

Portuguese footballer (born 1995)

Personal information
- Full name: Rúben Manuel Pereira Alves
- Date of birth: 19 March 1995 (age 31)
- Place of birth: Vila Nova de Gaia, Portugal
- Height: 1.68 m (5 ft 6 in)
- Positions: Attacking midfielder; winger

Team information
- Current team: Penafiel
- Number: 88

Youth career
- 2004–2006: Vilanovense
- 2006–2007: Pasteleira
- 2007–2008: Boavista
- 2008–2009: Pasteleira
- 2009–2013: Boavista
- 2013–2014: FC Porto

Senior career*
| Years | Team | Apps | (Gls) |
| 2012–2013 | Boavista | 20 | (1) |
| 2014–2015 | FC Porto B | 0 | (0) |
| 2014–2015 | → Famalicão (loan) | 8 | (1) |
| 2015–2016 | Sanjoanense | 32 | (3) |
| 2016–2019 | Braga B | 20 | (3) |
| 2017–2019 | → Anadia (loan) | 9 | (0) |
| 2019–2020 | Felgueiras | 39 | (7) |
| 2020–2021 | Salgueiros | 16 | (3) |
| 2021–2023 | Sanjoanense | 51 | (7) |
| 2023–2025 | Feirense | 64 | (4) |
| 2025–2026 | Penafiel | 27 | (0) |
| 2026– | Amarante | 2 | (0) |

International career
| 2014 | Portugal U19 | 4 | (0) |
- * Club domestic league appearances and goals as of 29 August 2026

Rúben Manuel Pereira Alves (born 19 March 1995) is a Portuguese professional footballer who plays as an attacking midfielder or winger for Liga Portugal 2 club Amarante.
