= Luís Machado (footballer, born 1992) =

Portuguese footballer

Personal information
- Full name: Luís Miguel Vieira Babo Machado
- Date of birth: 4 November 1992 (age 33)
- Place of birth: Lamego, Portugal
- Height: 1.71 m (5 ft 7 1/2 in)
- Position: Winger

Team information
- Current team: Amarante
- Number: 20

Youth career
- 1999–2010: Paredes
- 2010–2011: Freamunde

Senior career*
Years	Team	Apps	(Gls)
2009–2010	Paredes	2	(0)
2011–2014	Freamunde	60	(5)
2014–2015	Tondela	33	(2)
2016–2019	Feirense	85	(7)
2019–2020	Moreirense	21	(1)
2020–2021	NorthEast United	22	(7)
2021–2024	Radomiak	81	(7)
2024–2025	Kitchee	22	(6)
2025–2026	Ethnikos Achna	27	(1)
2026–	Amarante	2	(0)
- * Club domestic league appearances and goals as of 16:17, 31 August 2026 (UTC)

Luís Miguel Vieira Babo Machado (born 4 November 1992) is a Portuguese professional footballer who plays as a left winger for Liga Portugal 2 club Amarante.

== Club career ==
Born in Lamego, Viseu District, Machado joined Paredes in 1999, aged only six. In 2009, while still a junior, he made his senior debut, playing two fourth-division games with the club.

In the summer of 2010, Machado signed for Freamunde, where he completed his development. He was promoted to the first team for the 2011–12 season, playing his first match in the Segunda Liga on 25 September 2011, a 1–0 away loss against Belenenses.

On 5 July 2014, Machado agreed to a two-year contract at another second-tier side, Tondela. He scored two goals in 26 matches in his first year, as they reached the Primeira Liga for the first time in 82 years of history.

Machado made his debut in the Portuguese top flight on 14 August 2015, starting in a 1–2 home defeat to Sporting CP. In the following transfer window, however, he returned to division two after joining Feirense on a short-term deal. After achieving promotion and renewing his contract, he went on to spend a further three campaigns with the team, being relegated at the end of 2018–19 and subsequently released.

In the 2019 off-season, Machado signed a three-year contract with Moreirense. He moved abroad for the first time in his career in September 2020, joining NorthEast United of the Indian Super League. In his only season, he scored braces in the 2–2 draw at Bengaluru and the 3–1 home win over Odisha.

Machado joined Polish Ekstraklasa club Radomiak Radom in summer 2021. On 5 July 2024, he moved to the Hong Kong Premier League with Kitchee.

In the 2025–26 campaign, Machado represented Ethnikos Achna in the Cypriot First Division. The 33-year-old returned to Portugal in August 2026 after six years abroad, signing with second-division newcomers Amarante.
