= Tiago Fernandes (Portuguese footballer) =

Portuguese football manager

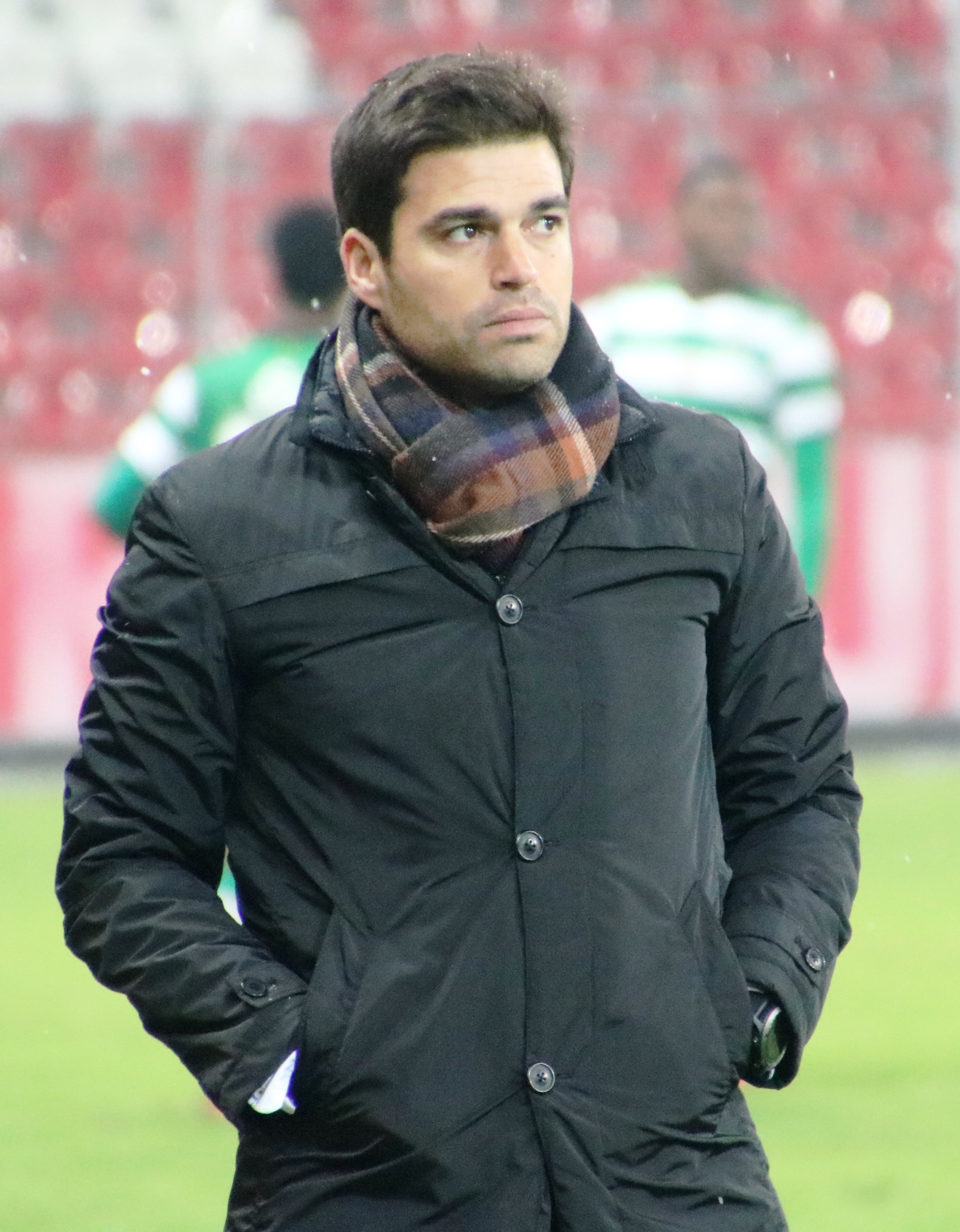
- Tiago Fernandes managing Sporting CP (youth) in 2018.

Personal information
- Full name: Tiago Manuel Matos Fernandes
- Date of birth: 17 August 1981 (age 45)
- Place of birth: Montijo, Portugal
- Height: 1.75 m (5 ft 9 in)
- Position: Midfielder

Team information
- Current team: Sporting CP B (manager)

Youth career
- 1991–1995: Montijo
- 1995–1997: Barreirense
- 1997–1998: Samouquense
- 1998–2000: Barreirense

Senior career*
Years	Team	Apps	(Gls)
2000–2001	Alcochetense		
2001–2002	1º Maio Sarilhense		
2002–2004	Alcacerense		
2004–2006	Alcochetense		
2006–2007	Vitória Setúbal B		
2007–2008	Pinhalnovense	5	(0)
2008–2010	Alcochetense		
2010–2011	Olímpico Montijo	8	(0)
2012–2013	Alcochetense		
2013	Olímpico Montijo	3	(0)
2014–2015	Juventude Sarilhense	11	(9)

Managerial career
- 2009–2011: Vitória Setúbal (assistant)
- 2011–2018: Sporting CP (youth)
- 2018–2019: Sporting CP (assistant)
- 2018: Sporting CP (interim)
- 2018–2019: Chaves
- 2019–2020: Estoril
- 2020: Leixões
- 2023–2024: Torreense U23
- 2024–2025: Torreense
- 2025–2026: Portimonense
- 2026–: Sporting CP B
- 2026: Sporting CP (interim)
- * Club domestic league appearances and goals

Tiago Manuel Matos Fernandes (born 17 August 1981) is a Portuguese football manager and former player who played as a midfielder. He is the manager of Sporting CP B in Liga Portugal 2.

After a lower-league playing career, he began coaching in 2009, leading Sporting CP (interim) and Chaves in the Primeira Liga and Estoril, Leixões, Torreense and Portimonense in the second tier.

== Playing career ==
Born in Montijo, Fernandes represented C.D. Montijo, F.C. Barreirense and A.D. Samouquense as a youth. He made his senior debut with G.D. Alcochetense in the 2000–01 season, in Terceira Divisão.

Fernandes never played in any higher than Segunda Divisão B in his career, representing 1º de Maio F.C. Sarilhense, Atlético Clube Alcacerense, Alcochetense (three spells), Vitória F.C. B, C.D. Pinhalnovense, Clube Olímpico do Montijo (two spells) and Juventude F.C. Sarilhense, where he retired in 2015 at the age of 34.

== Coaching career ==
In 2008, Fernandes started working as a scout at U.D. Leiria. He then worked as an assistant of his father at Vitória de Setúbal before joining Sporting CP's youth setup in 2011, initially as an assistant of the under-15s.

In 2013, Fernandes was named manager of the Lions' under-14 squad. He was named in charge of the under-19s in 2015, before being named assistant of José Peseiro in the main squad in July 2018. On 2 November of that year, he was named interim manager after Peseiro was sacked.

On his professional management debut two days later, Fernandes' side won 2–1 at C.D. Santa Clara. He won his only other Primeira Liga game by the same score at home to G.D. Chaves on 11 November, with a goalless UEFA Europa League draw at Arsenal inbetween.

Fernandes returned to his assistant role after the appointment of Marcel Keizer. On 10 December 2018, however, he was named manager of Chaves.

After leaving Chaves on a mutual agreement on 9 March 2019, Fernandes took over G.D. Estoril Praia on 4 June. He was dismissed the following 7 January, after four consecutive defeats.

On 3 July 2020, Fernandes was named at the helm of fellow second division side Leixões S.C. He left the club on 4 October, after five winless matches.

Fernandes did not return to work until 7 June 2023, at S.C.U. Torreense's under-23 team. The following 28 May, he succeeded Tulipa as head coach. Having achieved the club aim of finishing in the top five by coming fourth in the second tier, he left on 15 May 2025.

On 1 July 2025, Fernandes was hired by Portimonense S.C. in the same league.

On 24 June 2026, Fernandes returned to Sporting and signed a two-year contract to manage their reserve squad Sporting CP B in Liga Portugal 2.

== Personal life ==
Fernandes' father Manuel Fernandes was also a footballer and manager.
