= Rúdi Almeida =

Portuguese footballer

Personal information
- Full name: Rúdi Daniel Silva Almeida
- Date of birth: 19 March 2005 (age 21)
- Place of birth: Fátima, Portugal
- Height: 1.85 m (6 ft 1 in)
- Position: Forward

Team information
- Current team: Amarante
- Number: 91

Youth career
- 2012–2018: Fátima
- 2016–2018: Sporting CP
- 2018–2021: Benfica
- 2021–2024: Famalicão

Senior career*
Years	Team	Apps	(Gls)
2023–2026	Famalicão U23		
2025–2026	Famalicão		
2026–	→ Amarante (loan)		
- * Club domestic league appearances and goals as of 7 November 2026

Rúdi Daniel Silva Almeida (born 19 March 2005) is a Portuguese professional footballer who plays as a forward for Liga Portugal 2 club Amarante, on loan from Famalicão.

== Career ==
=== Youth career ===
Almeida began playing football at a young age, representing Fátima before joining the youth ranks of Sporting CP. He subsequently moved to Benfica, where he continued his development.

In 2021, Almeida joined Famalicão, initially representing the club's under-17 side. He progressed through the club's youth structure and became an important player for its under-19 and under-23 teams.

During the 2022–23 season, he represented the club's under-19 team, scoring 15 goals in 35 appearances. He subsequently featured regularly for Famalicão's under-23 side in the Liga Revelação.

=== Famalicão ===
Almeida progressed to Famalicão's senior team after several seasons in the club's academy. During the 2025–26 season, he scored 13 goals in 23 appearances for the under-23 team in the Liga Revelação, earning recognition as the competition's best player.

Almeida made his debut for Famalicão's first team on 9 February 2026, coming on as a substitute in a 3–1 Primeira Liga victory against AVS. He subsequently made another appearance against Sporting CP on 15 February.

On 23 June 2026, Famalicão announced that Almeida had renewed his contract with the club until the end of the 2028–29 season.

=== Amarante ===
On 4 September 2026, Almeida joined Amarante on loan from Famalicão for the 2026–27 season. The move was intended to provide him with regular playing opportunities at senior level in Liga Portugal 2.
