= Diogo Costa (footballer, born May 2003) =

Portuguese footballer

Personal information
- Full name: Diogo Miguel Pereira Costa
- Date of birth: 4 May 2003 (age 23)
- Place of birth: Barcelos, Portugal
- Position: Defender

Team information
- Current team: Amarante
- Number: 28

Youth career
- Aveleda
- Barroselas
- Carapeços

Senior career*
Years	Team	Apps	(Gls)
2020–2023	Roriz		
2023–2026	Gil Vicente		
2026–	→ Amarante (loan)		
- * Club domestic league appearances and goals as of 7 November 2026

Diogo Miguel Pereira Costa (born 4 May 2003) is a Portuguese professional footballer who plays as a defender for Liga Portugal 2 club Amarante, on loan from Gil Vicente.

== Club career ==
=== Youth career ===
Costa began his football development at Aveleda, before continuing his youth career at Barroselas and Carapeços. He subsequently represented Roriz before joining Gil Vicente.

=== Gil Vicente ===
Costa joined Gil Vicente in 2023, initially representing the club's under-23 team in the Liga Revelação.

He made his first-team debut on 4 May 2025, coming on as a substitute in the 75th minute of a 2–1 defeat against Sporting CP at Estádio José Alvalade. He made a second Primeira Liga appearance against Rio Ave on 16 May 2025, finishing the 2024–25 season with two league appearances.

During his time at Gil Vicente, Costa established himself in the club's under-23 side. Across three seasons, he made 66 appearances for the team. In the 2025–26 campaign, he featured in 28 matches and played every minute across both legs of the Taça Revelação final, which Gil Vicente won.

On 26 June 2026, Gil Vicente announced that Costa had signed a new two-year contract with the club.

=== Amarante ===
On 18 July 2026, Costa joined Amarante on a season-long loan from Gil Vicente ahead of the 2026–27 season.
