= Jorge Pinto (footballer) =

Portuguese football manager (born 1977)

Personal information
- Full name: Jorge Manuel Freitas Pinto
- Date of birth: 5 October 1977 (age 49)
- Place of birth: Porto, Portugal
- Height: 1.78 m (5 ft 10 in)
- Position: Wing-back

Senior career*
Years	Team	Apps	(Gls)
1996–2000	Salgueiros		
2000–2001	Maia		
2001–2002	Oliveirense		
2002–2004	Ovarense		
2005–2007	Vilanovense		
2007–2009	Amarante		
2009–2010	Pedrouços		
2011–2014	Infesta		

Managerial career
- 2013–2019: Infesta
- 2019–2021: Salgueiros
- 2021–2022: Amarante
- 2022–2024: Lusitânia Lourosa
- 2024–2025: Fafe
- 2025–2026: Oliveirense
- 2026: Amarante
- * Club domestic league appearances and goals

Jorge Manuel Freitas Pinto (born 5 October 1977), also known as Jorginho, is a Portuguese footballer manager and former professional player. He played mainly as a right-back, including for Salgueiros in the Primeira Liga. He most recently was manager of Liga Portugal 2 club Amarante.

== Club career ==
Pinto started his career with Salgueiros, playing for the Porto-based club in the Primeira Liga. In 2001–02, he played for Oliveirense.

Pinto ended his professional career with Infesta.

== Coaching career ==
After starting his coaching with Infesta, Pinto came back to Salgueiros as a manager in 2019, guiding the team back to national competitions with a promotion to the third-tier Campeonato de Portugal. Despite ambitions for promotion to Liga Portugal 2, the club struggled and a three-match losing streak led to Pinto's dismissal in January 2021.

After spending 2021-22 season at Amarante, Pinto joined Lusitânia Lourosa in 2022-23, leading the Leões to third-tier Liga 3 promotion. In the next season, he led Lourosa to the Promotion playoff for Liga Portugal 2, losing to rival neighbours Feirense.

Pinto was announced as the new manager of Liga 3 side Fafe for the 2024–25 season on 13 June 2024. He guided Fafe to the 3rd place during regular phase, however, a string of poor results during Promotion stage led to Pinto's dismissal on 8 April 2025.

Pinto returned in 2025-26 as manager of Oliveirense. He made his debut in Liga Portugal 2 with a draw against Farense. After a string of results that led to fan protests, Pinto was dismissed in January from his position.

Pinto was hired by Amarante to return as manager and led the club to its first participation in 37 years in Liga Portugal 2. He was released from his duties on 12 October after leading the club to two wins in their first 8 matches.
