= Amarante F.C. =

Portuguese association football club

Amarante
- Full name: Amarante Futebol Clube
- Nicknames: Alvinegros (Black and whites)
- Short name: Amarante
- Founded: 4 March 1923; 103 years ago
- Ground: Estádio Municipal de Amarante
- Capacity: 5,000
- President: Ricardo Ribeiro
- Head coach: Renato Coimbra
- League: Liga Portugal 2
- 2025–26: Liga 3 Serie A, 2nd (First stage); 1st (Promotion Stage)
- Website: amarantefc.pt
Home colours	Away colours	Third colours

Amarante Futebol Clube (Portuguese pronunciation: [ɐmɐˈɾɐ̃tɨ futɨˈβɔl ˈkluβɨ]), commonly known as Amarante F.C. or simply Amarante, is a Portuguese football club based in Amarante, Porto District. It currently competes in the Liga Portugal 2, the second tier of Portuguese football.

Founded in 1923, Amarante has spent most of its history in regional and lower national divisions. It has spent six seasons in the national second tier, including five seasons between 1979 and 1989 before returning to the level in 2026. The club has won four national minor titles – one at the third tier (2025–26) and three at the fourth tier (2007–08, 2010–11, and 2023–24) – and has twice reached the Round of 16 in the Taça de Portugal (2015–16 and 2023–24).

== History ==
=== Early years (1923–1977) ===
Amarante Futebol Clube was founded on 4 March 1923 by Pompeu da Cunha Brochado. The club played its first football match on 31 May 1923, defeating Stª. Natália 4–0. It affiliated with the Porto Football Association (AF Porto) in 1934, entering official regional competitions.

Amarante won its first regional title in 1935, becoming champions of the AF Porto championship in the 1934–35 season. The club subsequently progressed through the district divisions, winning promotion from the 3ª Divisão Distrital to the 2ª Divisão Distrital in 1953 and from the latter to the 1ª Divisão Distrital in 1964. In 1966, Amarante competed in the Terceira Divisão for the first time, after winning its regional series. The competition was then contested by the leading teams from the regional championships, with the winner gaining access to the Segunda Divisão. Amarante won its group and reached the quarter-finals, losing to Tirsense 0–1.

In 1977, Amarante won the AF Porto 1ª Divisão Distrital and returned to the Terceira Divisão, which by then operated as a national third-tier competition. This marked the beginning of the club's presence in the national divisions, where it would remain continuously until 1997.

=== Rise to the second tier (1977–1990) ===
Amarante established itself in the national divisions in the late 1970s. After finishing second in its Terceira Divisão series in 1978–79, the club earned promotion to the Segunda Divisão, then the second tier of Portuguese football, for the first time. It spent three consecutive seasons at that level from 1979–80 to 1981–82.

During its first spell in the second tier, Amarante also recorded one of the most notable results in its history. On 1 December 1979, it held Sporting CP to a 1–1 draw at Campo da Barroca in the Taça de Portugal, before losing 5–0 in the replay at Estádio José Alvalade.

After returning to the Terceira Divisão, Amarante won promotion back to the Segunda Divisão in 1985 and again in 1988. In total, the club spent five seasons in the second tier during the period, before its last appearance at that level in 1988–89.

A restructuring of the national championships in 1990 placed Amarante in the newly established Segunda Divisão B, then the third tier of Portuguese football. Amarante entered the competition at that level in 1990–91.

=== Between the national divisions and the district leagues (1990–2006) ===
The 1990s and early 2000s were marked by repeated movement between the national and district competitions. After being relegated from the Segunda Divisão B in 1990–91, Amarante returned to the third tier in 1993–94 but was relegated again in 1995–96. Following another relegation in 1996–97, the club spent the 1997–98 season in the AF Porto district competitions before winning promotion back to the national fourth tier for 1998–99. Amarante remained in the national divisions until 2002, when it was relegated to district football again. After finishing third in the AF Porto Divisão de Honra in 2004–05, the club won the competition in 2005–06 and returned to the national divisions.

=== Return to national prominence (2006–2023) ===
Amarante's return to the national divisions in 2006 began a period of renewed success. In 2007–08, the club won the Terceira Divisão, securing its first national championship at the fourth tier. It repeated the achievement in 2010–11.

In 2013, the Segunda Divisão and Terceira Divisão were merged to form the Campeonato Nacional de Seniores, with Amarante competing in the new third tier from the 2013–14 season. In 2015–16, the club reached the Round of 16 of the Taça de Portugal for the first time, defeating Primeira Liga side Marítimo 1–0 before losing 2–1 to Arouca. In June 2019, the Portuguese Football Federation certified Amarante as a four-star training entity, recognising its youth-development structures and organisation. Amarante continued to compete in the Campeonato de Portugal through the late 2010s and early 2020s.

In 2021, Amarante reached the promotion phase for the newly established Liga 3 after finishing among the qualifying teams in the 2020–21 Campeonato de Portugal. Although it did not secure promotion to Liga 3, the subsequent restructuring of the national leagues placed the Campeonato de Portugal and Amarante at the fourth tier for 2021–22.

=== Recent success (2023–present) ===
In 2023–24, Amarante secured promotion to Liga 3 in May 2024 before winning the Campeonato de Portugal title in June, defeating Vitória de Setúbal 3–0 in the final at the Estádio Nacional. The title was Amarante's third national championship at the fourth tier, following its victories in 2007–08 and 2010–11. During the same season, Amarante reached the Round of 16 of the Taça de Portugal for the second time, where it was eliminated by Gil Vicente.

In its first Liga 3 campaign in 2024–25, Amarante reached the promotion phase, finishing seventh. The following season began under manager Eurico Couto, who was dismissed in October 2025 after a difficult start to the campaign. Alex Costa was appointed as his replacement on 17 October 2025.

Under Costa, Amarante recovered strongly and qualified for the promotion phase of Liga 3. On 10 May 2026, Amarante secured the club's first promotion to the professional leagues and its return to the second level of Portuguese football for the first time since 1988–89 by defeating União de Santarém 1–0. Six days later, it defeated Vitória de Guimarães B 3–1 away to win the Liga 3 title. In recognition of the 2025–26 campaign, four Amarante players were selected for the Liga 3 Team of the Year, while Tiago Ventura received the league's Revelation Player award. In July 2026, the Municipality of Amarante awarded the club the Municipal Medal of Merit in recognition of its Liga 3 title and historic promotion to Liga Portugal 2.

Ahead of the 2026–27 season, Costa left the club and was replaced by Jorge Pinto, who returned to Amarante after previously managing the club in 2021–22. Pinto was dismissed from his duties on 12 October after leading the club to two wins in their first 8 matches. On 20 October, Renato Coimbra returned as head coach, having previously led the club to the 2023–24 Campeonato de Portugal title and promotion to Liga 3.

== Grounds ==
Amarante Futebol Clube has played at several grounds throughout its history. In its early years, the club used Campo da Praça (1923–1925), Campo da Florestal (1925–1926), Campo da Feira (1931–1933), and Campo da Barroca (1934–1981). The current Estádio Municipal de Amarante was opened in 1981, replacing Campo da Barroca, and underwent significant refurbishment in 2006. With a seating capacity of 5,000, the stadium is owned by the Amarante Municipality, serves as the club’s home ground and includes a main stand, press boxes and training facilities.

== Players ==
=== Current squad ===
As of 6 September 2026

Note: Flags indicate national team as defined under FIFA eligibility rules; some limited exceptions apply. Players may hold more than one non-FIFA nationality.

No.	Pos.	Nation	Player
1	GK	POR	Rafael Flores
2	DF	POR	Gonçalo Cunha (on loan from Torreense)
3	DF	GBS	Feliciano
4	DF	POR	João Filipe
5	DF	POR	João Ricardo
6	MF	POR	Rodrigo Guedes
7	FW	POR	Leandro Ferreira (on loan from Louletano)
8	MF	BRA	Tokinho Dória
9	FW	POR	Cardoso
10	FW	POR	Melvin Costa (on loan from Santa Clara)
11	DF	BRA	Alemão
12	DF	NGR	Lawrence Adeniyi
14	FW	NGR	Arome Idache
15	DF	POR	Rodrigo Beirão

No.	Pos.	Nation	Player
16	MF	POR	Rodrigo Carvalho
17	MF	POR	Rúben Silva
20	FW	POR	Luís Machado
23	FW	NGR	Kenneth Ikugar
26	MF	BFA	Faissal Zangré (on loan from Felgueiras)
28	DF	POR	Diogo Costa (on loan from Gil Vicente)
36	DF	BRA	Ian Custódio
51	GK	POR	Diogo Fernandes (on loan from Porto)
65	GK	POR	Didi
78	MF	POR	Simão Silva (on loan from Académico de Viseu)
85	MF	GBS	Nito Gomes
88	MF	POR	Rúben Alves
91	FW	POR	Rúdi Almeida (on loan from Famalicão)

=== Former notable players ===
Including only players who have appeared for their international team.

- (Angola) Carlos Fernandes
- (Portugal) Cláudio Ramos
- (Portugal) Delfim Teixeira (youth)
- (Angola) Luís Miguel
- (Cape Verde) Nando
- (Portugal) Nuno Gomes (youth)
- (Portugal) Ricardo Carvalho (youth)
- (Guinea) Salim Cissé
- (Portugal) Taí

== Recent seasons ==
Amarante's season-by-season performance over the last full ten seasons: (Note: Attributed to multiple references:)

Champions	Runners-up	Division winners	Division runners-up	Promoted	Relegated

Season	League										Cup	League Cup	Super Cup	Notes
Season	Division	Tier	Pos.	Pld	W	D	L	GF	GA	Pts	Result	Result	Result	Notes
2016–17	Campeonato de Portugal	3	1st	18	12	5	1	33	9	41	3R	DNP	DNP	
2016–17	Campeonato de Portugal	3	6th	14	4	5	5	18	17	17	3R	DNP	DNP	Promotion stage
2017–18	Campeonato de Portugal	3	6th	30	12	9	9	42	33	45	3R	DNP	DNP	
2018–19	Campeonato de Portugal	3	7th	34	15	9	10	45	28	54	3R	DNP	DNP	
2019–20	Campeonato de Portugal	3	10th	25	8	9	8	31	29	33	2R	DNP	DNP	Season was cancelled due to COVID-19
2020–21	Campeonato de Portugal ↓	3	5th	18	7	3	8	15	17	24	1R	DNP	DNP	
2020–21	Campeonato de Portugal ↓	3	4th	6	1	2	3	4	7	5	1R	DNP	DNP	Liga 3 Qualification Series
2021–22	Campeonato de Portugal	4	5th	18	8	6	4	33	21	30	1R	DNP	DNP	
2021–22	Campeonato de Portugal	4	1st	6	4	1	1	15	5	13	1R	DNP	DNP	Relegation stage
2022–23	Campeonato de Portugal	4	2nd	26	14	9	3	43	25	51	1R	DNP	DNP	
2022–23	Campeonato de Portugal	4	3rd	6	1	3	2	2	4	6	1R	DNP	DNP	Promotion stage
2023–24	Campeonato de Portugal ↑	4	1st	26	17	8	1	40	15	59	L16	DNP	DNP	
2023–24	Campeonato de Portugal ↑	4	1st	6	4	1	1	9	4	13	L16	DNP	DNP	Promotion stage
2023–24	Campeonato de Portugal ↑	4	W	1	1	0	0	3	0	-	L16	DNP	DNP	Championship final
2024–25	Liga 3	3	4th	18	9	3	6	16	11	30	4R	DNP	DNP	
2024–25	Liga 3	3	7th	14	3	4	7	14	18	13	4R	DNP	DNP	Promotion stage
2025–26	Liga 3 ↑	3	2nd	18	8	5	5	19	17	29	3R	DNP	DNP	
2025–26	Liga 3 ↑	3	1st	14	9	4	1	22	11	31	3R	DNP	DNP	Promotion stage

== Honours ==
=== National competitions ===
- Liga 3 (tier 3) (Note: Terceira Divisão from 1948 to 1990, Segunda Divisão from 1990 to 2013, Campeonato de Portugal from 2013 to 2021, Liga 3 since 2021)
  - Winners (1): 2025–26
- Terceira Divisão / Campeonato de Portugal (tier 4) (Note: Terceira Divisão from 1990 to 2013, no national competition at tier 4 from 2013 to 2021, Campeonato de Portugal since 2021)
  - Winners (3): 2007–08, 2010–11, 2023–24

=== Regional competitions ===
- AF Porto – 1ª Divisão / Divisão Honra (tier 1)
  - Winners (2): 1976–77, 2005–06
  - Runners-up (3): 1965–66, 1974–75, 1997–98
- AF Porto – 2ª Divisão (tier 2)
  - Winners (1): 1963–64
- AF Porto – 3ª Divisão (tier 3)
  - Winners (1): 1952–53

== Managers ==
Managers of Amarante F.C., their statistics and honours
Name	Nat.	From	To	Duration (Note: The durations of tenure displayed here are not entirely precise, as presidents typically do not take office on election day or the day election results are announced. Therefore, the dates shown refer to the day they assume office, or to election days if the former is not available.)	Honours	Ref.
Acácio Casimiro	(Portugal)	July 1980	June 1981	364 days		
Mário Nunes	(Portugal)	July 1988	June 1989	364 days		
António Borges	(Portugal)	July 1991	June 1993	1 year, 364 days		
Ferreira Pinto	(Portugal)	July 1993	June 1994	364 days		
Ferreira Pinto	(Portugal)	July 1998	June 1999	364 days		
Jorge Amaral	(Portugal)	January 2009	March 2009	89 days		
Arlindo Gomes	(Portugal)	July 2009	May 2012	2 years, 335 days	1 Terceira Divisão	
Adalberto Ribeiro	(Portugal)	31 May 2012	June 2013	1 year, 1 day		
Pedro Pinto	(Portugal)	5 June 2013	5 November 2018	5 years, 153 days		
Mauro Silva	(Portugal)	5 November 2018	November 2019	361 days		
Pedro Reis	(Portugal)	19 November 2019	14 September 2021	1 year, 299 days		
Jorge Pinto	(Portugal)	17 September 2021	May 2022	226 days		
Renato Coimbra	(Portugal)	20 May 2022	15 June 2024	2 years, 26 days	1 Campeonato de Portugal	
Álvaro Madureira	(Portugal)	25 June 2024	2 June 2025	342 days		
Eurico Couto	(Portugal)	2 July 2025	14 October 2025	104 days		
Alex Costa	(Portugal)	17 October 2025	30 June 2026	256 days	1 Liga 3	
Jorge Pinto	(Portugal)	1 July 2026	12 October 2026	103 days		
Hélder Queirós (interim)	(Portugal)	12 October 2026	20 October 2026	8 days		
Renato Coimbra	(Portugal)	20 October 2026	Present	18 days		

== Presidents ==
The following chronological list comprises all those who have held the position of president of Amarante F.C. since its inception. Each president's entry includes dates and duration of his tenure, as well as the club's men's football honours won under their management. Interim presidents are marked in italics.

Overview of Amarante F.C. presidents
No.	Name	Nat.	From	To	Duration	Honours	Ref.
1	Pompeu da Cunha Brochado	(Portugal)	4 March 1923	1923	302 days		
2	Adelino Bacelar Furtado	(Portugal)	1924	1924	365 days		
3	António Vahia	(Portugal)	1925	1926	1 year, 364 days		
4	Manuel Pereira	(Portugal)	1931	1933	2 years, 0 days		
—	António Vahia	(Portugal)	1933	1935	2 years, 0 days		
5	Abelámio Augusto da Silva	(Portugal)	1935	1936	1 year, 0 days		
—	Manuel Pereira	(Portugal)	1936	1937	1 year, 0 days		
6	José Martins Branco	(Portugal)	1937	1938	1 year, 0 days		
—	Manuel Pereira	(Portugal)	1938	1939	1 year, 0 days		
7	António Vieira	(Portugal)	1939	1940	1 year, 0 days		
8	Olímpio Saraiva	(Portugal)	1940	1941	1 year, 0 days		
9	Manuel Lobo da Silveira	(Portugal)	1944	1944	365 days		
10	Amadeu Faria	(Portugal)	1945	1946	1 year, 364 days		
11	Manuel van Zeller Macedo	(Portugal)	1947	1948	1 year, 365 days		
12	Teófilo da Mota Freitas	(Portugal)	1949	1949	364 days		
13	Luís van Zeller Macedo	(Portugal)	1950	1950	364 days		
14	José Soares de Queiroz	(Portugal)	1951	1951	364 days		
—	José Soares de Queiroz	(Portugal)	1952	1953	1 year, 0 days	1 AF Porto – 3ª Divisão	
15	José Bernardino Monteiro de Moura Basto	(Portugal)	1953	1954	1 year, 0 days		
16	Amadeu Cerqueira da Silva	(Portugal)	1954	1955	1 year, 0 days		
17	Joaquim Guedes de Magalhães	(Portugal)	1955	1957	2 years, 0 days		
18	Alberto Mário Coelho Marinho de Faria	(Portugal)	1957	1958	1 year, 0 days		
19	António Cerqueira Vahia	(Portugal)	1958	1959	1 year, 0 days		
20	Pedro da Silva e Sousa	(Portugal)	1959	1960	1 year, 0 days		
21	António Bento Soares	(Portugal)	1960	1961	1 year, 0 days		
22	José Nisolino Ribeiro Pinto Leite	(Portugal)	1961	1962	1 year, 0 days		
—	Pedro da Silva e Sousa	(Portugal)	1962	1963	1 year, 0 days		
—	António Vieira	(Portugal)	1963	1964	1 year, 0 days	1 AF Porto – 2ª Divisão	
23	Felisberto Augusto Gonçalves de Abreu	(Portugal)	1964	1967	3 years, 0 days		
24	Américo António	(Portugal)	1967	1968	1 year, 0 days		
—	Pedro da Silva e Sousa	(Portugal)	1968	1969	1 year, 0 days		
25	Amílcar Lopes Machado	(Portugal)	1969	1970	1 year, 0 days		
26	Ilídio Torres Teixeira	(Portugal)	1970	1971	1 year, 0 days		
—	Amílcar Lopes Machado	(Portugal)	1971	1973	2 years, 0 days		
27	José Cândido Ribeiro da Silva	(Portugal)	1973	1974	1 year, 0 days		
—	Amílcar Lopes Machado	(Portugal)	1974	1975	1 year, 0 days		
28	Ramiro Vieira Pinto	(Portugal)	1975	1981	6 years, 0 days	1 AF Porto – 1ª Divisão	
29	Jaime Magalhães	(Portugal)	1981	1982	1 year, 0 days		
30	Artur Pereira	(Portugal)	1982	1984	2 years, 0 days		
31	A. Teixeira da Silva	(Portugal)	1984	1987	3 years, 0 days		
32	Alexandre Machado	(Portugal)	1987	1988	1 year, 0 days		
33	José Manuel Pinto Moreira	(Portugal)	1988	1990	2 years, 0 days		
34	Maximino Pinheiro da Silva	(Portugal)	1990	1991	1 year, 0 days		
35	António Jorge Pereira da Silva	(Portugal)	1991	1992	1 year, 0 days		
36	Jorge Queirós	(Portugal)	1992	1997	5 years, 0 days		
37	José Morais Clemente Teixeira	(Portugal)	1997	November 2005	8 years, 304 days		
38	Joaquim Moreira Ferreira	(Portugal)	November 2005	November 2008	3 years, 0 days	1 AF Porto – Divisão Honra; 1 Terceira Divisão	
39	António Mendes Cardoso	(Portugal)	November 2008	June 2009	212 days		
40	Eduardo Jorge Medeiros Pinto	(Portugal)	June 2009	25 May 2013	3 years, 358 days	1 Terceira Divisão	
41	António Augusto Magalhães Duarte	(Portugal)	25 May 2013	1 July 2019	6 years, 37 days		
42	António Joaquim Silva Pinto Costa	(Portugal)	1 July 2019	3 July 2023	4 years, 2 days		
43	Ricardo Jorge da Silveira Ribeiro	(Portugal)	3 July 2023	Present	3 years, 127 days	1 Campeonato de Portugal; 1 Liga 3	

== Bibliography ==
- Alves Pinto, Pedro (1999). Amarante F.C. - 75 anos [Amarante F.C. - 75 years] (in Portuguese). Amarante, Portugal: Gráfica do Norte.
