= F.C. Vizela =

Portuguese association football club

Vizela
- Full name: Futebol Clube de Vizela
- Nickname: Vizelenses
- Founded: 1 January 1939; 87 years ago
- Ground: Estádio do Futebol Clube de Vizela, Vizela, Portugal
- Capacity: 6,000
- Chairman: Eduardo Guimarães
- Manager: Ronald Molina
- League: Liga Portugal 2
- 2025–26: Liga Portugal 2, 4th of 18
- Website: www.fcvizela.pt
Home colours	Away colours

Futebol Clube de Vizela is a Portuguese professional football club that plays in Liga Portugal 2, the second tier of Portuguese football. They are based in the town of Vizela and play in the Estádio do Futebol Clube de Vizela, with a capacity of 6,000.

== Brief history ==
Vizela joined the Braga Football Association on 1 August 1940. Twenty-six years later, the first trophy came, with the conquest of the Taça de Campeão Nacional after defeating Tramagal Sport União (5–3). The club spent the vast majority of its early years in the Campeonato de Portugal.

In 1984, Vizela were promoted for the first time in its history to the Primeira Liga, but this spell only lasted one season, with the club ranking last. Shortly after, the team was again in the third level, only returning in the 2000s.

Again in the "silver category" of Portuguese football, Vizela finished third in the 2007–08 season, falling just one point short of a promotion. In the following year, it finished in 10th position, but was relegated due to the Apito Dourado scandal; for several years, the club acted as S.C. Braga's farm team.

In May 2021, the club were placed 2nd in the 2020–21 Liga Portugal 2 to get promoted into the Primeira Liga for the second time in the club's history since 1985 after a 36-year absence.

== Players ==
=== Current squad ===
As of 19 September 2026

Note: Flags indicate national team as defined under FIFA eligibility rules; some limited exceptions apply. Players may hold more than one non-FIFA nationality.

No.	Pos.	Nation	Player
1	GK	ESP	Antonio Gomis
4	DF	PER	Jean-Pierre Rhyner
6	MF	SUI	Giovani Bamba
8	MF	BUL	Angel Bastunov
9	FW	ESP	Manu Garrido
11	FW	FRA	Natanael Ntolla
12	GK	FRA	Tim Guillou
13	DF	POR	Luís Rocha
16	MF	POR	Miguel Pires
17	FW	POR	Miguel Tavares
19	GK	SRB	Aleksandar Vulić
20	DF	NGR	Bright Godwin
21	MF	POR	Rodrigo Ramos
22	FW	ESP	Lucas Antañón
23	FW	HAI	Yassin Fortuné
24	MF	DOM	Heinz Mörschel

No.	Pos.	Nation	Player
26	DF	COL	Luis Mina
31	MF	BRA	Ângelo Neto
33	DF	ECU	Alfred Caicedo
36	MF	VEN	Matías Lacava
37	DF	POR	José Sampaio
39	DF	CIV	Ismaël Diallo
55	DF	BUL	Andrea Hristov
70	FW	COL	Cristian Cañozales
77	DF	CPV	Jójó
92	GK	POR	Pedro Souza
95	MF	FRA	Aliou Traoré
96	FW	NGR	Augustine Adamu
98	MF	CIV	Moustapha Sanogo
99	FW	AUS	Anthony Carter
—	FW	GHA	Abdul Awudu

=== Out on loan ===
Note: Flags indicate national team as defined under FIFA eligibility rules; some limited exceptions apply. Players may hold more than one non-FIFA nationality.

No.	Pos.	Nation	Player
—	DF	SRB	Stefan Obradović (at Železničar Pančevo until 30 June 2027)

== Coaching staff ==
Position	Staff
Manager	(Venezuela) Ronald Molina
Sporting Director	(Spain) Toni Dovale
Assistant Manager	(Portugal) João Rocha
Goalkeeper Coach	(Spain) Chon
Fitness Coach	(Portugal) Rui Fonseca
Fitness Coach	(Spain) Rodrigo Rivera
Analyst	(Portugal) Nuno Costa

== Appearances ==
- Primeira Liga: 3
- Second Level: 4
- Segunda Divisão: 28
- Terceira Divisão: 14
- Taça de Portugal: 38
- Taça da Liga (League Cup): 1

== League and Cup history ==
Season		Pos.	Pl.	W	D	L	GS	GA	P	Cup	Notes
1942–43	2D	5	14	4	4	6	27	46	14		
1943–44	2D	7	12	1	3	8	13	35	5		
1962–63	3D	4	10	4	1	5	28	25	9		
1984–85	1D	16	30	4	7	19	31	71	15		Relegated
1992–93	2D	2	32	15	8	9	49	35	38		
1996–97	2DB	10	34	11	12	11	35	37	45		
1998–99	2DB	5	34	15	9	10	58	40	54		
1999–2000	2DB	6	34	13	9	12	33	46	48		
2000–01	2DB	5	38	16	12	10	71	47	60		
2001–02	2DB	12	38	12	12	14	42	49	48		
2002–03	2DB	4	38	18	10	10	52	34	64		
2003–04	2DB	3	36	19	10	7	56	35	67		
2004–05	2DB	1	38	23	7	6	74	32	82		Promoted
2005–06	2H	11	34	11	11	12	42	48	44	Round 5	
2006–07	2H	13	30	9	7	14	29	32	34	Round 4	
2007–08	2H	3	30	13	11	6	40	22	50	Round 4	
2008–09	2H	11	16	4	7	5	15	22	19	Round 4	
2010–11	2DB	7	—	—	—	—	—	—	—		

=== Other statistics ===
- Primeira Liga:
  - Highest ranking: 11th (2022–23 season)
  - Lowest ranking: 16th (1984–85 season)
- Liga Portugal 2:
  - Highest ranking: 2nd (2020–21 season)
  - Lowest ranking: 13th (2006–07 season)
