= Lusitânia F.C. =

Portuguese association football club

Lusitânia
- Full name: Lusitânia de Lourosa Futebol Clube
- Nickname: Lusitanistas
- Founded: 14 April 1924; 102 years ago
- Stadium: Estádio do Lusitânia de Lourosa FC
- Capacity: 4,900
- President: Pedro Tomé
- Head coach: Ricardo Silva
- League: Liga Portugal 2
- 2025–26: Liga Portugal 2, 12nd of 18
- Website: llourosafc.pt
Home colours	Away colours	Third colours

Lusitânia Futebol Clube is a Portuguese football club from Lourosa in Santa Maria da Feira, Aveiro District. The club was founded in 1924 and competes in Liga Portugal 2, the second tier of the Portuguese football league system.

After winning the Terceira Divisão in 1973, the club reached the semi-finals of the Taça de Portugal in 1993–94. They defeated Argus, Praiense, Académica Coimbra, Beira-Mar, Chaves and Belenenses to reach the semi-final, where they lost 6–0 away to Sporting on 2 April 1994.

== History ==
In 2024–25, Lusitânia Lourosa secure promotion to Liga Portugal 2 for the first time in their history from next season. The club secure champions of Liga 3 in 2024–25.

== Stadium ==
The team played its home games at the Estádio do Lusitânia de Lourosa FC, which until the 2024/25 season had a capacity of approximately 8,000 spectators, mostly standing and unmarked. However, with promotion to the Second Division, the club was forced to undertake major renovations to the venue to host professional matches, which were achieved by reducing the capacity to 4,900 seats.

== Honours ==
- Liga 3
  - Champions: 2024–25

== Current squad ==
As of 16 September 2026

Note: Flags indicate national team as defined under FIFA eligibility rules; some limited exceptions apply. Players may hold more than one non-FIFA nationality.

No.	Pos.	Nation	Player
1	GK	BRA	Gabriel Souza
3	DF	POR	Josué Sá
4	DF	MRI	Dylan Collard
5	DF	POR	Silvério
6	MF	POR	António Montez
7	FW	POR	Mika Borges
9	FW	POR	João Silva
10	MF	POR	André Ricardo
11	FW	VEN	Moisés Tablante
12	MF	POR	Arsénio
16	DF	POR	Luís Rocha
17	FW	POR	João Santos
19	FW	SEN	Saliou Mandiang
20	MF	POR	Diogo Paulo

No.	Pos.	Nation	Player
21	FW	POR	Paulité
22	DF	POR	Bruno Faria
23	GK	POR	Marco Sousa
24	DF	POR	Ricardinho
27	MF	POR	Fabinho
29	GK	POR	Brian Araújo
40	DF	POR	Leonardo Paiva
42	DF	POR	Guilherme Soares
46	MF	POR	Francisco Reis
52	DF	POR	Francisco Machado
60	DF	BRA	Danny
80	FW	POR	Manel
88	MF	POR	Miguel Teixeira
90	FW	POR	Iuri Moreira

== Notable players ==
- (Portugal) Fernando Couto (youth)

== Coaches ==
- (Portugal) Álvaro Magalhães (26 April 1994 – 30 June 1997)
- (Portugal) Vasco Coelho (9 December 2004 – 7 March 2005)
- (Portugal) Pedro Martins (1 October 2007 – 2 June 2009)
- (Portugal) Vasco Coelho (1 July 2010 – 1 May 2011)
- (Portugal) Martelinho (23 December 2011 – 27 January 2014)
- (Portugal) Frederico Oliveira (1 July 2015 – 30 June 2016)
- (Portugal) Miguel Oliveira (1 July 2016 – December 2016)
- (Portugal) Martelinho (13 December 2016 – 20 February 2017)
- (Portugal) Tonel (1 March 2017 – 21 June 2017)
- (Portugal) António Caetano (21 June 2017 – 23 October 2017)
- (Portugal) Luís Miguel (25 October 2017 – 4 September 2018)
- (Portugal) André Ribeiro (5 September 2018 – 30 June 2019)
- (Portugal) Rui Quinta (10 June 2019 – 9 November 2020)
- (Portugal) Henrique Nunes (10 November 2020 – 30 June 2021)
- (Portugal) Filipe Moreira (1 July 2021 – 3 February 2022)
- (Portugal) André Canedo (caretaker) (3 February 2022 – 5 February 2022)
- (Portugal) Hélder Pereira (6 February 2022 – June 2022)
- (Portugal) Luís Pinto (11 June 2022 – 19 December 2022)
- (Portugal) Jorge Pinto (27 December 2022 – 5 June 2024)
- (Portugal) Renato Coimbra (15 June 2024 – 31 August 2024)
- (Portugal) Pedro Miguel (3 September 2024 – 20 May 2026)
- (Portugal) Ricardo Silva (24 May 2026 – present)
