= F.C. Paços de Ferreira =

Paços de Ferreira
- Full name: Futebol Clube Paços de Ferreira
- Nicknames: Pacenses (Those from Paços); Castores (Beavers)
- Founded: 5 April 1950; 76 years ago
- Ground: Estádio Capital do Móvel
- Capacity: 9,076
- President: Paulo Meneses
- Head coach: Vítor Paneira
- League: Liga 3
- 2025–26: Liga Portugal 2, 17th of 18 (relegated)
- Website: www.fcpf.pt
Home colours	Away colours	Third colours

Futebol Clube Paços de Ferreira (Portuguese pronunciation: [ˈpasuʒ ðɨ fɨˈʁɐjɾɐ]) is a Portuguese professional football club based in Paços de Ferreira, Porto District. Founded in 1950, the club competes in Liga 3, holding home games at the 9,076 seat Estádio Capital do Móvel The club's colours are yellow and green. The club is owned 100% by its members ("sócios").

They have won four Segunda Liga titles (now Liga Portugal 2), and in 2007 they qualified for the UEFA Cup for the first time. In the 2012–13 Primeira Liga, the team finished third and qualified for the 2013–14 UEFA Champions League play-offs for the first time in their history. They were also runners-up of the 2008–09 Taça de Portugal, the 2009 Supertaça Cândido de Oliveira and the 2010–11 Taça da Liga.

== History ==
=== Early history ===
The origin of the club dates back to the 1930s, when it was named Sport Club Pacense. They played for two decades without any official recognition until they entered the lower divisions in 1950, under the name Futebol Clube Vasco da Gama. The club then changed their kit colours to the current ones and renamed themselves Futebol Clube Paços de Ferreira.

Their first match under the current name came on 19 November 1950, beating Lousada 2–1. Agostinho Alves was the first goal scorer in the history of the Pacenses. The club then played in Portugal's third regional division until the 1956–57 season, where they were crowned champions. The club crest was created in 1961–62, and was used ever since.

The club was relegated and then promoted again and supporters hit the streets of the city on 17 June 1973 when they defeated Perosinho 3–0. One year later, they won the Terceira Divisão on 14 June 1974, after defeating Estrela de Portalegre. The hero of the match was the goalscorer Mascarenhas.

=== Recent history ===
After establishing themselves in the first division during the 1990s, and suffering a relegation in 2003–04, the club finished sixth in the first division in 2006–07, thus qualifying for the UEFA Cup, their first ever European competition, under manager José Mota. They lost 1–0 on aggregate to AZ of the Netherlands in the first round.

Having finished last in the league in 2007–08, Paços would have normally been relegated to the second level, but were readmitted after Boavista's confirmed irregularities. In the following year, already without Mota, the team finished tenth in the league and a second Europa League qualification spot after losing the Taça de Portugal final 1–0 to eventual league champions Porto on 31 May. The two clubs met again on 9 August in the Supertaça Cândido de Oliveira, which Porto won 2–0.

Paços entered the 2009–10 UEFA Europa League in the second qualifying round, where they defeated Zimbru Chișinău of Moldova before being eliminated by Bnei Yehuda Tel Aviv of Israel in the third. The club reached the 2011 Taça da Liga Final under Rui Vitória, losing 2–1 to S.L. Benfica at the Estádio Cidade de Coimbra.

In the 2012–13 season, Paços surprisingly qualified for the 2013–14 UEFA Champions League play-offs for the first time in their history after achieving third place in the league by passing favourites Braga and Sporting CP, making it their highest finish ever. The club were managed that season by Paulo Fonseca, who left at the end to join Porto, and was replaced by Costinha, who lost the Champions League playoff to Russians Zenit Saint Petersburg.

Paços' 13-year spell in the Primeira Liga ended in 2018, though they immediately returned as champions of the 2018–19 LigaPro under promotion specialist Vítor Oliveira. His successor Pepa took them to the UEFA Europa Conference League with a fifth-place finish in 2020–21, then left for Vitória de Guimarães. Their first European campaign in eight years ended in the playoff, with 3–1 aggregate defeat to Tottenham Hotspur despite winning the first game. A four-year spell in the top flight ended with relegation in 2022–23, a season in which manager César Peixoto was sacked and then hired again in under three months, either side of José Mota's winless return to the club.

== League and cup history ==
=== Recent seasons ===
Season	League									Cup	League Cup	Europe		Notes
Season	Div.	Pos.	Pl	W	D	L	GS	GA	Pts	Result	Result	Competition	Result	Notes
2001–02	1st	8th	34	12	10	12	41	44	46	Last 16	n/a	–	–	–
2002–03	1st	6th	34	12	9	13	40	47	45	SF	n/a	–	–	–
2003–04	1st	17th	34	8	4	22	27	53	28	Last 32	n/a	–	–	^{[A]}
2004–05	2nd	1st	34	20	9	5	61	43	69	Last 64	n/a	–	–	^{[B]}
2005–06	1st	11th	34	11	9	14	38	49	42	Last 64	n/a	–	–	–
2006–07	1st	6th	30	10	12	8	31	36	42	Last 64	n/a	–	–	–
2007–08	1st	15th	30	6	7	17	31	49	25	Last 16	R3	UEFA Cup	R1	^{[C]}
2008–09	1st	10th	30	9	7	14	37	42	34	RU	R3	–	–	–
2009–10	1st	10th	30	8	11	11	32	37	35	QF	R2	UEFA Europa League	3rd QR	–
2010–11	1st	7th	30	10	11	9	35	42	41	Last 32	RU	–	–	–
2011–12	1st	10th	30	8	7	15	35	53	31	Last 32	R3	–	–	–
2012–13	1st	3rd	30	14	12	4	42	29	54	SF	R3	–	–	^{[D]}
2013–14	1st	15th	30	6	6	18	28	59	24	Last 16	R3	UEFA Champions League; UEFA Europa League	PO; Gr. E	^{[E]}
2014–15	1st	8th	34	12	11	11	40	45	47	Last 16	R2	–	–	–
2015–16	1st	7th	34	13	10	11	43	42	49	Last 32	R3	–	–	–
2016–17	1st	13th	34	8	12	14	32	45	36	Last 32	R3	–	–	–
2017–18	1st	17th	34	7	9	18	33	59	30	Last 64	R3	–	–	–
2018–19	2nd	1st	34	23	5	6	50	21	74	Last 16	R3	–	–	–
2019–20	1st	13th	34	11	6	17	36	52	39	QF	R3	–	–	–
2020–21	1st	5th	34	15	8	11	40	41	53	Last 32	QF	–	–	–
2021–22	1st	11th	34	9	11	14	29	44	38	Last 32	R3	–	–	–
2022–23	1st	17th	34	6	5	23	26	62	23	Last 64	GS	–	–	^{[F]}
2023–24	2nd	5th	34	14	10	10	42	35	52	Last 128	R1	–	–	–

A. Relegated.
B. Promoted.
C. Not relegated due to Boavista scandal (Apito Dourado).
D. Best league finish.
E. Qualification to relegation play-offs. Paços beat D. Aves 3–1 and secured the presence in Primeira Liga.
F. Relegated.

Last updated: 22 September 2024

== Honours ==
- Taça de Portugal
  - Runners-up: 2008–09
- Taça da Liga
  - Runners-up: 2010–11
- Supertaça Cândido de Oliveira
  - Runners-up: 2009
- Segunda Liga/LigaPro
  - Winners (4) – record: 1990–91, 1999–2000, 2004–05, 2018–19
- Terceira Divisão
  - Winners: 1973–74

== Youth honours ==
- AF Porto Jun.B 1ª Divisão (U17)
  - Winners: 2013–14
- AF Porto Jun.D 1ª Divisão (U13)
  - Winners: 2011–12

== European record ==
=== UEFA club competition record ===
Season	Competition	Round	Opponent	Home	Away	Aggregate
2007–08	UEFA Cup	First round	(Netherlands) AZ	0–1	0–0	0–1
2009–10	UEFA Europa League	Second qualifying round	(Moldova) Zimbru Chișinău	1–0	0–0	1–0
2009–10	UEFA Europa League	Third qualifying round	(Israel) Bnei Yehuda Tel Aviv	0–1	0–1	0–2
2013–14	UEFA Champions League	Play-off round	(Russia) Zenit Saint Petersburg	1–4	2–4	3–8
2013–14	UEFA Europa League	Group E	(Italy) Fiorentina	0–0	0–3	3rd place
2013–14	UEFA Europa League	Group E	(Ukraine) Dnipro Dnipropetrovsk	0–2	0–2	3rd place
2013–14	UEFA Europa League	Group E	(Romania) Pandurii Târgu Jiu	1–1	0–0	3rd place
2021–22	UEFA Europa Conference League	Third qualifying round	(Northern Ireland) Larne	4–0	0−1	4−1
2021–22	UEFA Europa Conference League	Play-off round	(England) Tottenham Hotspur	1–0	0–3	1−3

=== UEFA coefficient ===
Correct as of 21 May 2025.

Rank	Team	Points
130	(Portugal) Gil Vicente F.C.	12.453
131	(Portugal) C.D. Santa Clara	12.453
132	(Portugal) F.C. Paços de Ferreira	12.453
133	(Portugal) Rio Ave F.C.	12.453
134	(Kazakhstan) FC Astana	12.000

== Players ==
=== Current squad ===
As of 20 September 2026

Note: Flags indicate national team as defined under FIFA eligibility rules; some limited exceptions apply. Players may hold more than one non-FIFA nationality.

No.	Pos.	Nation	Player
1	GK	POR	Rafa
2	DF	POR	Tiago Mesquita
3	DF	BRA	Diegão
5	DF	BRA	Marcão (on loan from Atlético Goianiense)
6	MF	POR	Tomás Podstawski
7	FW	BRA	Jotta (on loan from Londrina)
8	MF	POR	Nuno Cunha
10	MF	BRA	João Neto (on loan from Red Bull Bragantino)
11	FW	POR	Sacra
15	DF	POR	Leandro Dias
19	MF	POR	Tomás Castro
20	MF	POR	Tiago Queiroz (on loan from Santa Clara)
22	DF	BRA	Wesley
25	MF	POR	Bubacar Djaló

No.	Pos.	Nation	Player
29	DF	POR	Tiago Cerveira
31	GK	POR	Cristiano
33	DF	POR	Rafael Vieira
34	MF	POR	Anunciação
37	MF	ROU	Ianis Vulpe
38	MF	POR	Gabi
43	DF	POR	João Sidónio
70	FW	BRA	Vitinho
80	MF	BRA	Caio Rafael (on loan from Londrina)
85	DF	POR	Diogo Castro
88	MF	POR	Chico Ramos
96	FW	POR	Miguel Falé
99	FW	BRA	Platiny

=== Out on loan ===
Note: Flags indicate national team as defined under FIFA eligibility rules; some limited exceptions apply. Players may hold more than one non-FIFA nationality.

No. / Pos. / Nation / Player; — / GK / POR / Zé Pedro (at Rebordosa until 30 June 2027)	No. / Pos. / Nation / Player; — / FW / POR / Vlad (at Celta Fortuna until 30 June 2027)

== Staff ==
Position	Staff
Managing Director	(Portugal) Jaime Sousa
Sporting Director	(Portugal) Carlos Carneiro
Manager	(Portugal) Ricardo Silva
Assistant Manager	(Portugal) Luís Monteiro
First-Team Coach	(Portugal) Nuno Fonseca
Analyst	(Portugal) Vasco Silva
Goalkeeper Coach	(Portugal) Filipe Moreira
Physiologist	(Portugal) Gustavo Dunkel
Data Scientist	(Portugal) Prof. Paulo Roriz
Scouting	(Portugal) Cadú
Club Doctor	(Portugal) André Maia Silva
Nurse	(Portugal) Ricardo Neves
Physiotherapist	(Portugal) Rui Dias
Physiotherapist	(Portugal) João Bastos
Kit Manager	(Portugal) Paulo Neto

== Former managers ==
- (Portugal) Vítor Oliveira (1988–92)
- (Portugal) Neca (1992–93)
- (Portugal) Jaime Pacheco (1993–94)
- (Portugal) Raul Águas (1994–95)
- (Portugal) José Rachão (1995–96)
- (Portugal) Henrique Calisto (1996–97)
- (Portugal) Eurico Gomes (1 July 1997 – 30 June 1999)
- (Portugal) Henrique Calisto (1999)
- (Portugal) José Mota (8 Jan 2000 – 30 June 2003)
- (Portugal) José Manuel Gomes (July 2003 – 3 Oct)
- (Portugal) José Mota (22 Oct 2003 – 16 May 2008)
- (Portugal) Paulo Sérgio (22 May 2008 – 14 Oct 2009)
- (Portugal) Manuel Sousa (interim) (15 Oct 2009 – 18 Oct 2009)
- (Portugal) Ulisses Morais (19 Oct 2009 – 20 May 2010)
- (Portugal) Rui Vitória (3 June 2010 – 30 Aug 2011)
- (Portugal) Luís Miguel (31 Aug 2011 – 27 Nov 2011)
- (Portugal) Henrique Calisto (1 Dec 2011 – 27 May 2012)
- (Portugal) Paulo Fonseca (28 May 2012 – 9 June 2013)
- (Portugal) Costinha (17 June 2013 – 28 Oct 2013)
- (Portugal) Henrique Calisto (29 Oct 2013 – 24 Feb 2014)
- (Portugal) Jorge Costa (26 Feb 2014 – 30 June 2014)
- (Portugal) Paulo Fonseca (1 July 2014 – 26 May 2015)
- (Portugal) Jorge Simão (25 June 2015 – 21 May 2016)
- (Portugal) Carlos Pinto (1 July 2016 – 28 November 2016)
- (Portugal) Vasco Seabra (29 November 2016 – 23 October 2017)
- (Portugal) Petit (23 October 2017 – 9 January 2018)
- (Portugal) João Henriques (12 January 2018 – 21 May 2018)
- (Portugal) Pepa (2019–2021)
- (Portugal) Jorge Simão (2021)
- (Portugal) César Peixoto (2021–2022)
- (Portugal) José Mota (2022)
- (Portugal) Marco Paiva (2022–2023)
- (Portugal) César Peixoto (2023)
- (Portugal) Ricardo Silva (2023–2025)
- (Portugal) Carlos Fangueiro (2025)
- (Portugal) Filipe Cândido (2025–)

== Supporters ==
The supporters' club, "Ultras Yellow Boys," was founded in 1996, then disbanded but returning afterwards in 2001. Two previous groups, however extinct, existed: "Febre Amarela" and "Yellowmania".
