= 2024–25 Taça de Portugal =

Taça de Portugal Generali Tranquilidade

Tournament details
- Country: Portugal
- Dates: 7 September 2024 – 25 May 2025
- Teams: 147

Final positions
- Champions: Sporting CP (18th title)
- Runners-up: Benfica

The 2024–25 Taça de Portugal (also known as Taça de Portugal Generali Tranquilidade for sponsorship reasons) was the 85th edition of the Taça de Portugal, the premier knockout competition in Portuguese football. The winners qualified for the 2025–26 UEFA Europa League league stage should they have not qualified via the league.

A total of 147 teams entered the cup. All teams from the top four tiers of the Portuguese football league system competed in this edition – excluding reserve or B teams, which were not eligible – together with representatives of the fifth-tier District leagues and cups. The competition began on 7 September 2024 with the first-round matches involving teams from the third, fourth and fifth tiers, and concluded on 25 May 2025 with the final at the Estádio Nacional in Oeiras.

Primeira Liga side Porto were the three-time defending champions, however they were eliminated in the fourth round as they lost to Moreirense 2–1. Sporting CP secured their 18th cup by defeating Benfica 3–1 in extra time, on the 25th May 2025.

== Format ==
Round	Clubs remaining	Clubs involved	Winners from previous round	New entries this round	Leagues entering at this round (tier)
First round	147	113	none	113	Liga 3 (3rd): 18 teams Campeonato de Portugal (4th): 52 teams District Football Associations (5th): 43 teams
Second round	110	92	37+39	16	Liga Portugal 2 (2nd): 16 teams
Third round	64	64	46	18	Primeira Liga (1st): 18 teams
Fourth round	32	32	32	none	none
Fifth round	16	16	16	none	none
Quarter-finals	8	8	8	none	none
Semi-finals	4	4	4	none	none
Final	2	2	2	none	none

== Teams ==
A total of 147 teams competed in the 2024–25 edition, comprising 18 teams from the Primeira Liga (tier 1), 16 teams from the Liga Portugal 2 (tier 2), 18 teams from the Liga 3 (tier 3), 52 teams from the Campeonato de Portugal (tier 4) and 43 teams from the District championships and cups (tier 5).

=== Primeira Liga ===
- Arouca
- AVS
- Benfica
- Boavista
- Braga
- Casa Pia
- Estoril
- Estrela da Amadora
- Famalicão
- Farense
- Gil Vicente
- Moreirense
- Nacional
- Porto
- Rio Ave
- Santa Clara
- Sporting CP
- Vitória de Guimarães

=== Liga Portugal 2 ===
- Académico de Viseu
- Alverca
- Chaves
- Feirense
- Felgueiras
- Leixões
- Mafra
- Marítimo
- Oliveirense
- Paços de Ferreira
- Penafiel
- Portimonense
- Tondela
- Torreense
- União de Leiria
- Vizela

=== Liga 3 ===
Série A

- Amarante
- Anadia
- Fafe
- Lusitânia Lourosa
- Sanjoanense
- São João de Ver
- Trofense
- Varzim
- Vilaverdense

Série B

- 1º Dezembro
- Académica
- Atlético CP
- Belenenses
- Caldas
- Lusitânia
- Oliveira do Hospital
- Sp. Covilhã
- União de Santarém

=== Campeonato de Portugal ===
Série A

- Atlético dos Arcos
- Bragança
- Brito
- Dumiense
- Joane
- Limianos
- Os Sandinenses
- Paredes
- Pevidém
- Rebordosa
- Tirsense
- Vianense
- Vila Real

Série B

- Alpendorada
- Beira-Mar
- Camacha
- Cinfães
- Coimbrões
- Gondomar
- Guarda
- Leça
- Machico
- Marco 09
- Régua
- Salgueiros
- União de Lamas

Série C

- Alcains
- Arronches
- Benfica Castelo Branco
- Fátima
- Marialvas
- Marinhense
- Mortágua
- O Elvas
- Peniche
- Pêro Pinheiro
- Sertanense
- Sp. Pombal
- União 1919

Série D

- Amora
- Barreirense
- Comércio e Indústria
- Estrela de Vendas Novas
- Fabril do Barreiro
- Lagoa
- Louletano
- Lusitano Évora
- Moncarapachense
- Moura
- Operário
- Serpa
- Sintrense

=== District Championships ===
Algarve FA

- Esperança de Lagos
- Ferreiras

Angra do Heroísmo FA

- Juventude Lajense
- Velense

Aveiro FA

- Estarreja
- Ovarense

Beja FA

- Castrense
- Praia Milfontes

Braga FA

- Maria da Fonte
- Vieira

Bragança FA

- Macedo de Cavaleiros
- Vinhais

Castelo Branco FA

- Académico do Fundão
- Pedrógão

Coimbra FA

- Académica-SF
- Tocha

Évora FA

- GD Portel
- Sp. Viana Alentejo

Guarda FA

- Ginásio Figueirense
- Vila Cortez

Horta FA

- Desportivo Lajense
- Madalena

Leiria FA

- Vieirense
- União Serra

Lisbon FA

- Fut. Benfica
- Sacavenense

Madeira FA

- Juventude de Gaula

Ponta Delgada FA

- Rabo de Peixe
- São Roque

Portalegre FA

- Eléctrico
- Gavionenses

Porto FA

- Aliança de Gandra
- Maia Lidador

Santarém FA

- Abrantes e Benfica
- Ferreira do Zêzere

Setúbal FA

- O Grandolense
- Olímpico Montijo

Viana do Castelo FA

- Cardielense
- Desportivo Monção

Vila Real FA

- Pedras Salgadas
- Valpaços

Viseu FA

- Oliveira de Frades
- GD Resende

Notes

2R: 39 teams receive bye to Second round

== First round ==
The draw was made on the 2 August 2024, on the Federação Portuguesa de Futebol official You-Tube channel. 39 teams received byes to the 2nd round. The matches was played on 7-15 September 2024.

Number of teams per tier entering this round
Primeira Liga (1)	Liga Portugal 2 (2)	Liga 3 (3)	Campeonato de Portugal (4)	District Championships (5)	Total
18 / 18	16 / 16	18 / 18	52 / 52	43 / 43	147 / 147

Team 1	Score	Team 2
7 September 2024
União de Santarém (3)	2–0	Sacavenense (5)
Ovarense (5)	1–1 (6–7 p)	São João de Ver (3)
Rebordosa (4)	3–0	Juventude de Gaula (5)
Machico (4)	3–0	Macedo de Cavaleiros (5)
Ginásio Figueirense (5)	0–5	Sanjoanense (3)
Guarda (4)	5–4 (a.e.t.)	Estarreja (5)
Lusitânia Lourosa (3)	2–1	União de Lamas (4)
Académica (3)	2–0	Benfica Castelo Branco (4)
8 September 2024
Leça (4)	2–2 (1–3 p)	Marco 09 (4)
Abrantes e Benfica (5)	0–2	Operário (4)
União 1919 (4)	2–2 (4–2 p)	Beira-Mar (4)
Valpaços (5)	3–5	Limianos (4)
Fafe (3)	1–4	Amarante (3)
Vila Cortez (5)	2–4 (a.e.t.)	Anadia (3)
Vieirense (5)	1–4	Sertanense (4)
Vieira (5)	2–0	Pedras Salgadas (5)
Sp. Viana Alentejo (5)	1–2	Belenenses (3)
Vila Real (4)	0–0 (3–1 p)	Joane (4)
Vianense (4)	2–1	Vinhais (5)
São Roque (5)	1–2 (a.e.t.)	Lusitânia (3)
Praia Milfontes (5)	0–5	Serpa (4)
Pedrógão (5)	1–3	Sp. Pombal (4)
Oliveira de Frades (5)	0–3	Mortágua (4)
Moura (4)	1–0	GD Portel (5)
Moncarapachense (4)	3–0	O Grandolense (5)
Maria da Fonte (5)	2–1	Cardielense (5)
Louletano (4)	3–0	Esperança de Lagos (5)
Ferreira do Zêzere (5)	2–0	Académico do Fundão (5)
Madalena (5)	0–2	Estrela de Vendas Novas (4)
Dumiense (4)	2–3	Vilaverdense (3)
Cinfães (4)	3–0	GD Resende (5)
Gavionenses (5)	0–3	Arronches (4)
Caldas (3)	1–0	União Serra (5)
Fut. Benfica (5)	4–3 (a.e.t.)	Comércio e Indústria (4)
Brito (4)	2–1	Maia Lidador (5)
Aliança de Gandra (5)	2–1 (a.e.t.)	Salgueiros (4)
15 September 2024
Velense (5)	1–2	Régua (4)

== Second round ==
The draw was made on the 2 August 2024 (after the first round draw was finished), on the Federação Portuguesa de Futebol official YouTube channel. 37 winners from the first round were joined to 39 teams (which received byes). Sixteen clubs from Liga Portugal 2 also started from this stage. The winners proceeded to the third round. The matches were played on 20-22 September 2024.

Number of teams per tier entering this round
Primeira Liga (1)	Liga Portugal 2 (2)	Liga 3 (3)	Campeonato de Portugal (4)	District Championships (5)	Total
18 / 18	16 / 16	17 / 18	44 / 52	15 / 43	110 / 147

Team 1	Score	Team 2
20 September 2024
1º Dezembro (3)	2–1	Oliveirense (2)
21 September 2024
Vianense (4)	1–3	Portimonense (2)
Anadia (3)	3–0	Rabo de Peixe (5)
Pevidém (4)	2–1 (a.e.t.)	Marítimo (2)
Olímpico Montijo (5)	1–2	Mafra (2)
Desportivo Lajense (5)	0–1	Maria da Fonte (5)
Tirsense (4)	2–0	Vieira (5)
Camacha (4)	0–2	União de Leiria (2)
Tocha (5)	1–4	Penafiel (2)
Académica (3)	0–1 (a.e.t.)	Torreense (2)
22 September 2024
Varzim (3)	3–0	Ferreiras (5)
Peniche (4)	0–2	Paços de Ferreira (2)
Lagoa (4)	2–0	União 1919 (4)
Juventude Lajense (5)	2–1	Fabril do Barreiro (4)
Amora (4)	1–0	Felgueiras (2)
Sintrense (4)	2–1	Estrela de Vendas Novas (4)
São João de Ver (3)	1–0	Serpa (4)
Rebordosa (4)	2–1	Bragança (4)
Pêro Pinheiro (4)	1–0	Feirense (2)
Paredes (4)	3–2	Vilaverdense (3)
Marialvas (4)	2–1	Tondela (2)
Oliveira do Hospital (3)	2–0	Machico (4)
Moura (4)	4–2	Castrense (5)
Moncarapachense (4)	2–1	Louletano (4)
Marinhense (4)	0–0 (2–4 p)	Caldas (3)
Lusitano Évora (4)	1–1 (3–2 p)	Académico de Viseu (2)
Guarda (4)	0–1	Leixões (2)
Gondomar (4)	1–0	Aliança de Gandra (5)
Ferreira do Zêzere (5)	1–2 (a.e.t.)	Os Sandinenses (4)
Alpendorada (4)	3–0	Sertanense (4)
Eléctrico (5)	0–2	Amarante (3)
Sp. Covilhã (3)	4–0	Sp. Pombal (4)
Coimbrões (4)	2–3	Alverca (2)
Cinfães (4)	3–2 (a.e.t.)	Barreirense (4)
Brito (4)	0–0 (6–5 p)	Operário (4)
Atlético CP (3)	3–0	Mortágua (4)
Arronches (4)	0–1	Vila Real (4)
Alcains (4)	4–1	Fut. Benfica (5)
Marco 09 (4)	0–0 (1–4 p)	O Elvas (4)
Limianos (4)	0–2	Chaves (2)
Académica-SF (5)	1–2 (a.e.t.)	Atlético dos Arcos (4)
Lusitânia (3)	2–1	Régua (4)
União de Santarém (3)	2–1	Desportivo Monção (5)
Lusitânia Lourosa (3)	4–3 (a.e.t.)	Vizela (2)
Fátima (4)	0–0 (2–4 p)	Sanjoanense (3)
Belenenses (3)	3–0	Trofense (3)

== Third round ==
The draw was made on 25 September 2024 on the Federação Portuguesa de Futebol official YouTube channel. 46 winners from the second round joined to 18 clubs from Primeira Liga, which started from this stage. The winners proceeded to the fourth round. The matches were played 18-21 October 2024.

Number of teams per tier entering this round
Primeira Liga (1)	Liga Portugal 2 (2)	Liga 3 (3)	Campeonato de Portugal (4)	District Championships (5)	Total
18 / 18	9 / 16	14 / 18	21 / 52	2 / 43	64 / 147

Team 1	Score	Team 2
18 October 2024
Portimonense (2)	1–2	Sporting CP (1)
19 October 2024
Belenenses (3)	0–2	Gil Vicente (1)
Atlético CP (3)	1–3 (a.e.t.)	Rio Ave (1)
União de Santarém (3)	1–2	Moreirense (1)
Gondomar (4)	0–1	Santa Clara (1)
Amora (4)	0–5	Casa Pia (1)
Amarante (3)	6–1	Juventude Lajense (5)
Oliveira do Hospital (3)	1–0	Mafra (2)
Caldas (3)	1–2	Tirsense (4)
Paços de Ferreira (2)	1–3	Vitória de Guimarães (1)
Anadia (3)	1–3 (a.e.t.)	Estrela da Amadora (1)
1º Dezembro (3)	1–2	Braga (1)
Pevidém (4)	0–2	Benfica (1)
20 October 2024
Sanjoanense (3)	2–4	Farense (1)
Vila Real (4)	2–0	Atlético dos Arcos (4)
São João de Ver (3)	4–1	Paredes (4)
Marialvas (4)	1–2	Rebordosa (4)
O Elvas (4)	3–2 (a.e.t.)	Torreense (2)
Maria da Fonte (5)	0–5	Arouca (1)
Lusitano Évora (4)	0–0 (4–3 p)	Estoril (1)
Leixões (2)	2–1	Alcains (4)
União de Leiria (2)	2–1	Nacional (1)
Lagoa (4)	0–2	Famalicão (1)
Alpendorada (4)	1–2 (a.e.t.)	Cinfães (4)
Sp. Covilhã (3)	3–2	Moncarapachense (4)
Brito (4)	1–0	Moura (4)
Alverca (2)	3–0	Pêro Pinheiro (4)
Chaves (2)	2–0	Lusitânia Lourosa (3)
Sintrense (4)	0–3	Porto (1)
Os Sandinenses (4)	0–2	AVS (1)
Varzim (3)	1–0	Boavista (1)
21 October 2024
Penafiel (2)	2–3 (a.e.t.)	Lusitânia (3)

== Fourth round ==
The draw for the fourth round was made on the 23 October 2024 on the Federação Portuguesa de Futebol official You-Tube channel. The winners proceed to Fifth round. The matches was played on 23-24 November 2024.

Number of teams per tier entering this round
Primeira Liga (1)	Liga Portugal 2 (2)	Liga 3 (3)	Campeonato de Portugal (4)	District Championships (5)	Total
15 / 18	4 / 16	6 / 18	7 / 52	0 / 43	32 / 147

Team 1	Score	Team 2
22 November 2024
Sporting CP (1)	6–0	Amarante (3)
23 November 2024
Lusitânia (3)	0–2	São João de Ver (3)
Alverca (2)	2–2 (2–4 p)	Rio Ave (1)
Arouca (1)	1–2	Farense (1)
Lusitano Évora (4)	3–2	AVS (1)
Vitória de Guimarães (1)	2–0	União de Leiria (2)
Leixões (2)	0–2	Braga (1)
Casa Pia (1)	3–0	Chaves (2)
Benfica (1)	7–0	Estrela da Amadora (1)
24 November 2024
Tirsense (4)	1–0	Brito (4)
Vila Real (4)	0–2	Gil Vicente (1)
Sp. Covilhã (3)	2–3	Rebordosa (4)
Oliveira do Hospital (3)	4–2	Cinfães (4)
Famalicão (1)	0–1	Santa Clara (1)
Moreirense (1)	2–1	Porto (1)
Varzim (3)	1–2	O Elvas (4)

== Fifth round ==
Number of teams per tier entering this round
Primeira Liga (1)	Liga Portugal 2 (2)	Liga 3 (3)	Campeonato de Portugal (4)	District Championships (5)	Total
10 / 18	0 / 16	2 / 18	4 / 52	0 / 43	16 / 147

18 December 2024	Sporting CP (1)	2–1 (a.e.t.)	Santa Clara (1)	Lisbon
20:45	Harder 74'; Gyökeres 113'	Report	Ferreira 90+8'	Stadium: Estádio José Alvalade

21 December 2024	Tirsense (4)	1–0	Rebordosa (4)	Santo Tirso
11:00	Mesquita 57'	Report		Stadium: Estádio Abel Alves de Figueiredo

21 December 2024	Oliveira do Hospital (3)	1–3	São João de Ver (3)	Tábua
14:00	Nascimento 42'	Report	Daniel 20'; Tavares 40'; Victor 71'	Stadium: Estádio Municipal de Tábua

12 January 2025	O Elvas (4)	2–1	Vitória de Guimarães (1)	Elvas
14:00	Lucão 50'; Nketia 75'	Report	Michel 2'	Stadium: Campo Domingos Carrilho Patalino

12 January 2025	Casa Pia (1)	1–3	Rio Ave (1)	Rio Maior
16:45	Pereira 42'	Report	Bondoso 6'; Clayton 15'; Morais 81'	Stadium: Estádio Municipal de Rio Maior

12 January 2025	Gil Vicente (1)	1–0	Moreirense (1)	Barcelos
19:45	Correia 70'	Report		Stadium: Estádio Cidade de Barcelos

14 January 2025	Farense (1)	1–3	Benfica (1)	Faro
20:15	Tomané 7'	Report	Schjelderup 56'; Cabral 58'; Bah 62'	Stadium: Estádio de São Luís

15 January 2025	Braga (1)	2–1	Lusitano Évora (4)	Braga
20:15	A. Horta 22'; R. Horta 44'	Report	Sousa 85'	Stadium: Estádio Municipal de Braga

== Quarter-finals ==
Number of teams per tier entering this round
Primeira Liga (1)	Liga Portugal 2 (2)	Liga 3 (3)	Campeonato de Portugal (4)	District Championships (5)	Total
5 / 18	0 / 16	1 / 18	2 / 52	0 / 43	8 / 147

6 February 2025	Rio Ave (1)	2–1	São João de Ver (3)	Vila do Conde
20:45	Clayton 34', 90+8'	Report	Ruca 19' (pen.)	Stadium: Estádio dos Arcos

25 February 2025	O Elvas (4)	0–2	Tirsense (4)	Elvas
20:00		Report	Franco 45+2'; Rodrigues 53'	Stadium: Campo Domingos Carrilho Patalino; Referee: João Pinto

26 February 2025	Benfica (1)	1–0	Braga (1)	Lisbon
20:45	V. Pavlidis 39'	Report		Stadium: Estádio da Luz

27 February 2025	Gil Vicente (1)	0–1	Sporting CP (1)	Barcelos
20:45		Report	Debast 68'	Stadium: Estádio Cidade de Barcelos

== Semi-finals ==
Number of teams per tier entering this round
Primeira Liga (1)	Liga Portugal 2 (2)	Liga 3 (3)	Campeonato de Portugal (4)	District Championships (5)	Total
3 / 18	0 / 16	0 / 21	1 / 54	0 / 43	4 / 154

3 April 2025
20:15

Sporting CP (1)	2–0	(1) Rio Ave
Catamo 12'; Gyökeres 45+1' (pen.)	Report

Estádio José Alvalade, Lisbon
Attendance: 30,038
Referee: António Nobre
22 April 2025
20:45

Rio Ave (1)	1–2	(1) Sporting CP
André 66'	Report	Inácio 11'; Gyökeres 50'

Estádio Capital do Móvel, Paços de Ferreira
Attendance: 3,703
Referee: Hélder Carvalho

Sporting CP won 4–1 on aggregate.

9 April 2025
20:45

Tirsense (4)	0–5	(1) Benfica
	Report	João Pedro 16' (o.g.); Rego 26'; Prestianni 67'; Cabral 72'; Schjelderup 84'

Estádio Cidade de Barcelos, Barcelos
Attendance: 11,950
Referee: David Silva
23 April 2025
20:15

Benfica (1)	4–0	(4) Tirsense
A. Silva 45+3'; Bajrami 74'; Belotti 78'; Barreiro 90+1'	Report

Estádio da Luz, Lisbon
Referee: Bruno Costa

S.L Benfica won 9–0 on aggregate.

== Final ==
25 May 2025
17:15

Benfica	1–3 (a.e.t.)	Sporting CP
Kökçü 47'	Report	Gyökeres 90+11' (pen.); Harder 99'; Trincão 120+1'

Estádio Nacional, Oeiras
Attendance: 37,393
Referee: Luís Godinho

== Bracket ==
Fifth round
12 January 2025
O Elvas	2
Vitória de Guimarães	1
21 December 2024
Tirsense	1
Rebordosa	0
14 January 2025
Farense	1
Benfica	3
15 January 2025
Braga	2
Lusitano Évora	1
12 January 2025
Gil Vicente	1
Moreirense	0
18 December 2024
Sporting CP (a.e.t.)	2
Santa Clara	1
12 January 2025
Casa Pia	1
Rio Ave	3
21 December 2024
Oliveira do Hospital	1
São João de Ver	3

Quarter-finals
25 February 2025
O Elvas	0
Tirsense	2
26 February 2025
Benfica	1
Braga	0
27 February 2025
Gil Vicente	0
Sporting CP	1
6 February 2025
Rio Ave	2
São João de Ver	1

Semi-finals
9 and 23 April 2025
Tirsense	0	0	0
Benfica	5	4	9
3 and 22 April 2025
Sporting CP	2	2	4
Rio Ave	0	1	1

Final
25 May 2025
Benfica	1
Sporting CP (a.e.t.)	3
