= Balotelli (footballer, born 1997) =

Bissau-Guinean footballer (born 1997)

Personal information
- Full name: João Pereira Albertine
- Date of birth: 3 February 1997 (age 29)
- Place of birth: Bissau, Guinea-Bissau
- Height: 1.87 m (6 ft 2 in)
- Position: Forward

Team information
- Current team: Madura United
- Number: 77

Senior career*
Years	Team	Apps	(Gls)
2018	Benfica de Bissau	18	(5)
2018–2019	Limianos	7	(0)
2020	Ferreira Aves	13	(4)
2021–2022	Lusitânia	2	(0)
2022	→ Pevidém (loan)	12	(2)
2022–2023	Amarante	32	(14)
2023–2025	Atlético CP	39	(9)
2025	PSM Makassar	14	(5)
2025–	Madura United	17	(2)
2026	→ Hong Linh Ha Tinh (loan)	4	(1)
- * Club domestic league appearances and goals as of 6 September 2026

João Pereira Albertine (born 3 February 1997), commonly known as Balotelli, is a Bissau-Guinean professional footballer who plays as a forward for Super League club Madura United.

== Career ==
Balotelli began his career at Benfica de Bissau and finally decided to go abroad for the first time to Portugal and joined Limianos in the 2018–19 season.

=== Amarante ===
Balotelli was signed for Amarante to play in Campeonato de Portugal in the 2022–23 season. He made his league debut on 18 September 2022 in a 2–0 win against São Martinho. On 9 October 2022, he scored his first league goal for the club, in a 1–1 draw over Maria da Fonte. On 4 December 2022, Balotelli scored a brace in a 3–2 win over Vilar de Perdizes. A week later, Balotelli scored the winning goal in a 1–0 away win over Tirsense. On 29 January 2023, Balotelli scored his eighth goal for Amarante in a 3–2 win over Maria da Fonte, in week 16 of the Campeonato de Portugal. During the 2022–23 season, Balotelli helped his team finish 3rd in the promotion play-offs with 32 appearances and 14 goals. He left the club at July 2023.

=== Atlético CP ===
Balotelli signed for Atlético CP to play in Liga 3 (Portugal) in the 2023–24 season. He made his league debut on 9 August 2023 in a 3–3 draw against Caldas. Five days later, Balotelli scored his first goal for the club with scored a brace in Liga 3, earning them a 2–0 win over Pero Pinheiro. On 17 December 2023, he scored another brace for Atlético CP in a 2–1 away win against 1º Dezembro. After extending his contract until 2025, he scored his first goal of 2024 on 7 January for the club in a 3–1 win over Alverca in Week 15 of Liga 3.

=== PSM Makassar ===
On 12 January 2025, Balotelli decided to move to Asia and signed a contract with Liga 1 club PSM Makassar. Balotelli chose 87 as his squad number. The following day, Balotelli scored his first league goal for the club in his debut match against Persis Solo in a 1–0 win. On 18 January 2025, Balotelli scored equalizer in injury time of a 1–1 draw over PSBS Biak. On 10 February 2025, he was sent off with a red card in the 80th minute in a match against Arema in a 1–1 draw.

=== Madura United ===
On 25 June 2025, Balotelli officially signed for Madura United.
