= 2022–23 Campeonato de Portugal =

10th season of the Campeonato de Portugal football league

Campeonato de Portugal
- Season: 2022–23
- Dates: 18 September 2022 – 11 June 2023
- Champions: Atlético CP
- Promoted: 1º Dezembro; Atlético; Lusitânia Lourosa; Pêro Pinheiro; Vianense
- Relegated: Alcains; Alpendorada; Angrense; Arronches; Bragança; Castro Daire; Coruchense; Esperança de Lagos; Ferreiras; Guarda Desportiva; Leça; Loures; Machico; Maria da Fonte; Merelinense; Monção; Olhanense; Oriental Dragon; Pedras Salgadas; Praiense; Resende; Rio Maior (withdrew); São Martinho; União da Serra

The 2022–23 Campeonato de Portugal is the tenth season of Portuguese football's renovated fourth-tier league, since the merging of the Segunda Divisão and Terceira Divisão in 2013, and the seventh season under the current Campeonato de Portugal title. After the creation of Liga 3, the new third-tier league in 2021, this is the second season of Campeonato Portugal as the fourth-tier league in Portuguese football league system, the 25th overall at that level.

This edition is contested by 56 clubs (55 after Rio Maior withdrew): 4 clubs relegated from 2021–22 Liga 3, 21 clubs promoted by 2021–22 District Championships and 31 clubs from the 2021–22 Campeonato de Portugal.

== Teams ==
Location of teams in 2022-23 Campeonato de Portugal
Location of teams in 2022-23 Campeonato de Portugal (Azores)
Location of teams in 2022-23 Campeonato de Portugal (Madeira)

Team	Location	2021–22 finish
Lusitânia Lourosa	Santa Maria da Feira	4th Liga 3 Relegation Serie 3
Pevidém	Guimarães	4th Liga 3 Relegation Serie 4
União de Santarém	Santarém	4th Liga 3 Relegation Serie 5
Oriental Dragon	Moita	4th Liga 3 Relegation Serie 6
Leça	Matosinhos	3rd CP Promotion North Serie
Salgueiros	Porto	4th CP Promotion North Serie
Sertanense	Sertã	4th CP Promotion South Serie
São Martinho	Santo Tirso	5th CP Promotion North Serie
Olhanense	Olhão	5th CP Promotion South Serie
Marítimo B	Funchal	6th CP Promotion North Serie
Pêro Pinheiro	Sintra	6th CP Promotion South Serie
Vianense	Viana do Castelo	1st CP Relegation Serie A
Pedras Salgadas	Vila Pouca de Aguiar	1st CP Relegation Serie B
Amarante	Amarante	1st CP Relegation Serie C
Camacha	Santa Cruz	1st CP Relegation Serie D
Valadares	Vila Nova de Gaia	1st CP Relegation Serie E
Castro Daire	Castro Daire	1st CP Relegation Serie F
Benfica Castelo Branco	Castelo Branco	1st CP Relegation Serie G
Marinhense	Marinha Grande	1st CP Relegation Serie H
Loures	Loures	1st CP Relegation Serie I
Praiense	Praia da Vitória	1st CP Relegation Serie J
Juventude de Évora	Évora	1st CP Relegation Serie K
Imortal	Albufeira	1st CP Relegation Serie L
Merelinense	Braga	2nd CP Relegation Serie A
Maria da Fonte	Póvoa de Lanhoso	2nd CP Relegation Serie B
Tirsense	Santo Tirso	2nd CP Relegation Serie C
Vila Meã	Amarante	2nd CP Relegation Serie D
Gondomar	Gondomar	2nd CP Relegation Serie E
Ferreira de Aves	Sátão	2nd CP Relegation Serie F
Oleiros	Oleiros	2nd CP Relegation Serie G
Coruchense	Coruche	2nd CP Relegation Serie H
Sintrense	Sintra	2nd CP Relegation Serie I
Rabo de Peixe	Ribeira Grande	2nd CP Relegation Serie J
Serpa	Serpa	2nd CP Relegation Serie K
Esperança de Lagos	Lagos	2nd CP Relegation Serie L
Ferreiras	Albufeira	1st Algarve FA District
Beira-Mar	Aveiro	1st Aveiro FA District
Angrense	Angra do Heroísmo	1st Azores Champ.
Vasco da Gama Vidigueira	Vidigueira	1st Beja FA District
Dumiense	Braga	1st Braga FA District
Bragança	Bragança	1st Bragança FA District
Alcains	Castelo Branco	2nd Castelo Branco FA District
Vigor da Mocidade	Coimbra	1st Coimbra FA District
Lusitano de Évora	Évora	1st Évora FA District
Guarda Desportiva	Guarda	1st Guarda FA District
União da Serra	Leiria	1st Leiria FA District
Atlético CP	Lisbon	1st Lisboa FA District
Pontassolense	Ponta do Sol	1st Madeira FA Champ.
Arronches	Arronches	1st Portalegre FA District
Alpendorada	Marco de Canaveses	1st Porto FA District
Rio Maior	Rio Maior	1st Santarém FA District
Fabril	Barreiro	1st Setúbal FA District
Monção	Monção	1st Viana do Castelo FA District
Vilar de Perdizes	Montalegre	1st Vila Real FA District
Mortágua	Mortágua	1st Viseu FA District
Rebordosa	Paredes	2nd Porto FA District

== Group stage ==
=== Serie A ===
Pos	Team	Pld	W	D	L	GF	GA	GD	Pts	Qualification or relegation	AMA	VIA	PEV	TIR	VIM	VIP	BRI	DUM	MER	PED	MON	MAF	SAO	BRA
1	Amarante (Q)	26	14	9	3	43	25	+18	51	Qualification to Promotion play-offs		2–4	3–2	1–3	2–0	3–2	0–0	4–1	2–1	0–1	4–2	1–1	2–0	5–0
2	Vianense (Q)	26	15	5	6	34	23	+11	50	Qualification to Promotion play-offs	1–2		3–1	0–1	1–1	1–1	1–0	0–0	2–1	1–0	2–1	1–0	2–1	2–0
3	Pevidém	26	14	4	8	41	27	+14	46		0–1	4–0		1–3	2–0	0–0	0–1	3–1	2–2	3–1	1–0	1–0	4–1	0–1
4	Tirsense	26	14	2	10	39	25	+14	44		0–1	1–0	1–2		1–1	0–2	0–1	1–2	1–0	1–0	2–0	2–0	0–1	2–0
5	Vila Meã	26	11	6	9	39	30	+9	39		0–1	0–1	2–1	0–1		2–2	2–0	0–0	1–1	3–2	5–1	4–0	2–1	2–1
6	Vilar de Perdizes	26	8	12	6	33	32	+1	36		1–1	3–1	2–2	1–6	1–0		2–2	1–1	1–1	1–1	0–2	2–0	1–1	1–0
7	Brito	26	9	8	9	21	28	−7	35		1–1	0–0	0–3	1–0	0–2	0–0		1–0	1–1	0–0	2–0	2–0	2–1	1–0
8	Dumiense	26	9	7	10	34	35	−1	34		1–1	0–1	0–1	2–3	3–2	0–2	2–1		1–0	4–2	2–1	2–0	2–2	3–0
9	Merelinense (R)	26	8	9	9	32	32	0	33	Relegation to District Championship	1–1	0–2	0–1	1–0	2–1	1–2	1–2	2–1		2–1	2–1	1–1	1–0	3–0
10	Pedras Salgadas (R)	26	8	8	10	27	28	−1	32	Relegation to District Championship	0–0	1–0	1–1	1–2	1–0	3–1	2–0	1–1	3–1		0–1	3–1	1–1	0–2
11	Monção (R)	26	7	6	13	34	45	−11	27	Relegation to District Championship	1–1	0–0	1–2	1–4	2–4	0–0	4–0	2–1	2–2	1–0		0–3	1–1	2–2
12	Maria da Fonte (R)	26	6	7	13	27	45	−18	25	Relegation to District Championship	2–3	2–3	3–2	2–1	2–2	1–0	2–1	2–2	0–2	0–0	2–6		0–3	0–0
13	São Martinho (R)	26	5	9	12	24	34	−10	24	Relegation to District Championship	0–0	1–2	0–1	1–0	0–1	0–4	3–1	1–2	0–0	1–1	3–1	0–0		0–0
14	Bragança (R)	26	5	6	15	20	39	−19	21	Relegation to District Championship	0–1	0–3	0–1	2–2	1–2	3–0	1–1	1–0	2–2	0–1	0–1	1–3	3–1	

Updated to match(es) played on 16 April 2023. Source: FPF.pt
Legend: Blue = home team win; Yellow = draw; Red = away team win.
Rules for classification: 1) Points, 2) Head-to-head points, 3) Head-to-head goal difference, 4) Goal difference, 5) Matches won, 6) Goals scored
(Q) Qualified for the phase indicated; (R) Relegated

=== Serie B ===
Pos	Team	Pld	W	D	L	GF	GA	GD	Pts	Qualification or relegation	SAL	LUS	REB	BEI	MAR	VGA	GON	CAM	LEC	MAC	ALP	CAS	RES	GUA
1	Salgueiros (Q)	26	15	7	4	39	25	+14	52 (Note: Salgueiros are ranked ahead of Lusitânia Lourosa on head-to-head points: Salgueiros 1–1 Lusitânia Lourosa, Lusitânia Lourosa 0–1 Salgueiros.)	Qualification to Promotion play-offs		1–1	1–1	1–0	1–1	1–1	0–0	0–2	2–1	2–0	5–4	1–1	3–1	2–0
2	Lusitânia Lourosa (Q)	26	15	7	4	49	23	+26	52	Qualification to Promotion play-offs	0–1		2–0	2–2	3–1	1–1	4–0	2–1	1–0	2–0	2–1	2–1	3–3	4–1
3	Rebordosa	26	14	9	3	42	23	+19	51		2–2	2–1		0–0	2–0	1–0	2–0	2–0	1–1	2–1	2–1	2–0	3–1	2–0
4	Beira-Mar	26	13	9	4	34	21	+13	48		2–1	1–2	1–3		2–1	1–1	0–0	2–2	1–0	3–3	2–1	1–0	0–0	2–1
5	Marítimo B	26	12	7	7	39	26	+13	43		2–1	1–1	1–1	0–0		2–1	2–2	2–0	3–0	1–1	1–1	5–1	1–0	3–0
6	Valadares Gaia	26	10	10	6	39	29	+10	40		0–1	2–0	1–1	0–2	2–1		3–2	3–0	2–2	2–1	2–0	0–0	2–2	1–1
7	Gondomar	26	10	8	8	33	32	+1	38		1–2	0–0	0–1	0–2	1–0	2–2		2–1	2–0	3–2	3–1	3–1	3–2	2–2
8	Camacha	26	9	7	10	30	34	−4	34		2–1	1–1	0–2	0–1	3–2	2–2	0–2		1–0	1–1	0–1	0–0	2–1	4–1
9	Leça (R)	26	10	3	13	29	29	0	33	Relegation to District Championship	1–2	1–2	1–0	1–0	0–3	3–1	0–2	1–1		4–0	0–1	1–0	0–1	2–0
10	Machico (R)	26	7	8	11	31	40	−9	29 (Note: Machico are ranked ahead of Alpendorada on head-to-head away goals: Machico 0–0 Alpendorada, Alpendorada 2–2 Machico.)	Relegation to District Championship	0–2	1–0	2–2	1–1	0–2	0–2	2–0	0–1	0–1		0–0	2–2	3–2	3–0
11	Alpendorada (R)	26	8	5	13	30	43	−13	29	Relegation to District Championship	0–1	1–6	0–3	0–4	2–0	1–3	0–1	2–2	2–1	2–2		1–0	2–0	0–0
12	Castro Daire (R)	26	4	8	14	23	34	−11	20	Relegation to District Championship	1–2	0–2	2–2	0–1	0–1	0–1	0–0	1–1	0–2	0–1	1–0		3–1	4–0
13	Resende (R)	26	4	5	17	30	50	−20	17	Relegation to District Championship	1–2	0–3	2–2	0–1	1–2	2–1	2–1	0–1	0–1	1–2	0–3	2–2		2–4
14	Guarda Desportiva (R)	26	2	5	19	21	60	−39	11	Relegation to District Championship	0–1	0–2	3–1	1–2	0–1	0–3	1–1	1–2	1–5	2–3	2–2	0–3	0–3	

Updated to match(es) played on 16 April 2023. Source: FPF.pt
Legend: Blue = home team win; Yellow = draw; Red = away team win.
Rules for classification: 1) Points, 2) Head-to-head points, 3) Head-to-head goal difference, 4) Goal difference, 5) Matches won, 6) Goals scored
(Q) Qualified for the phase indicated; (R) Relegated

=== Serie C ===
Pos	Team	Pld	W	D	L	GF	GA	GD	Pts	Qualification or relegation	1DE	PPI	USA	BCB	MAR	SIN	SER	MOR	COR	UDS	LOU	ARR	ALC	RIO
1	1º Dezembro (Q)	24	14	5	5	35	19	+16	47	Qualification to Promotion play-offs		4–0	0–0	0–1	1–0	3–1	0–1	1–0	2–1	2–0	3–0	3–1	2–1	ANU
2	Pêro Pinheiro (Q)	24	13	7	4	33	24	+9	46	Qualification to Promotion play-offs	0–0		1–0	3–1	1–0	2–2	2–3	2–2	2–1	3–1	2–0	1–0	1–0	ANU
3	União Santarém	24	12	9	3	35	13	+22	45		1–1	2–1		1–1	4–0	1–1	2–0	4–1	0–0	3–0	3–0	3–0	1–0	ANU
4	Benfica Castelo Branco	24	10	9	5	32	26	+6	39 (Note: Benfica Castelo Branco are ranked ahead of Marinhense on head-to-head away goals: Benfica Castelo Branco 1–0 Marinhense, Marinhense 1–2 Benfica Castelo Branco.)		1–2	0–1	1–0		1–0	1–1	1–1	0–0	2–1	4–3	3–1	2–0	1–1	ANU
5	Marinhense	24	11	6	7	29	23	+6	39		2–0	2–3	1–0	1–2		2–2	0–0	3–1	2–1	1–0	0–0	3–1	3–0	ANU
6	Sintrense	24	9	8	7	32	23	+9	35		0–1	0–1	0–0	0–0	2–0		1–0	2–4	2–0	3–1	1–0	5–0	4–1	ANU
7	Sertanense	24	8	9	7	28	25	+3	33 (Note: Sertanense are ranked ahead of Mortágua on goal difference, due to equal head-to-head: Sertanense 1–1 Mortágua, Mortágua 1–1 Sertanense.)		0–1	1–1	0–0	1–1	0–2	1–0		1–1	1–1	1–0	2–1	0–1	1–3	ANU
8	Mortágua	24	8	9	7	40	38	+2	33		2–0	1–1	1–2	2–2	2–2	2–1	1–1		1–2	3–3	4–0	1–1	0–4	ANU
9	Coruchense (R)	24	6	9	9	29	28	+1	27 (Note: Coruchense are ranked ahead of União da Serra on goal difference, due to equal head-to-head: Coruchense 2–1 União da Serra, União da Serra 2–1 Coruchense.)	Relegation to District Championship	2–2	1–1	1–1	2–0	0–0	0–1	2–2	2–4		2–1	1–1	1–0	4–0	ANU
10	União da Serra (R)	24	8	3	13	29	39	−10	27	Relegation to District Championship	1–2	2–1	1–2	1–1	1–2	0–1	2–1	1–0	2–1		2–1	1–2	5–4	ANU
11	Loures (R)	24	6	6	12	25	40	−15	24	Relegation to District Championship	1–1	2–2	1–1	1–3	1–2	2–1	1–3	1–2	1–0	0–0		2–1	1–0	ANU
12	Arronches (R)	24	5	4	15	15	38	−23	19	Relegation to District Championship	2–1	0–1	0–2	3–1	0–0	1–1	0–3	0–2	0–0	0–1	1–2		1–0	ANU
13	Alcains (R)	24	3	2	19	21	47	−26	11	Relegation to District Championship	0–2	0–1	1–2	0–2	0–1	0–0	0–3	2–3	0–3	0–1	2–5	2–0		ANU
14	Rio Maior	0	0	0	0	0	0	0	0	Withdrew	ANU	ANU	ANU	ANU	ANU	ANU	ANU	ANU	ANU	ANU	ANU	ANU	ANU	

Updated to match(es) played on 16 April 2023. Source: FPF.pt
Legend: Blue = home team win; Yellow = draw; Red = away team win.
Rules for classification: 1) Points, 2) Head-to-head points, 3) Head-to-head goal difference, 4) Goal difference, 5) Matches won, 6) Goals scored
(Q) Qualified for the phase indicated; (R) Relegated

=== Serie D ===
Pos	Team	Pld	W	D	L	GF	GA	GD	Pts	Qualification or relegation	ATL	LUE	JUE	RDP	IMO	FAB	VGV	SER	ORD	PRA	ESP	ANG	OLH	FER
1	Atlético (Q)	26	15	7	4	43	22	+21	52	Qualification to Promotion play-offs		2–2	1–1	1–0	1–1	1–0	1–0	4–3	2–2	3–0	5–1	2–0	2–1	1–0
2	Lusitano Évora (Q)	26	15	6	5	35	22	+13	51	Qualification to Promotion play-offs	1–0		0–1	1–0	2–0	2–1	1–3	2–1	0–0	3–1	1–1	1–0	2–1	1–0
3	Juventude Évora	26	13	7	6	37	16	+21	46		0–0	1–2		2–1	1–0	3–0	1–0	0–0	3–1	3–2	1–0	6–0	4–0	0–0
4	Rabo de Peixe	26	13	6	7	33	19	+14	45		0–0	1–0	1–0		0–1	2–0	4–0	2–1	2–0	2–1	1–1	1–0	0–1	4–1
5	Imortal	26	9	12	5	31	22	+9	39 (Note: Imortal are ranked ahead of Fabril do Barreiro and Vasco da Gama Vidigueira on head-to-head points: Imortal - 6 pts, Fabril do Barreiro - 5 pts, Vasco da Gama Vidigueira - 2 pts.)		0–1	0–1	1–1	3–3		0–0	0–0	1–1	2–2	2–2	2–2	3–0	2–0	1–0
6	Fabril do Barreiro	26	11	6	9	31	26	+5	39		2–0	1–1	2–0	1–0	0–2		3–0	2–1	1–1	1–2	3–0	3–2	2–0	2–0
7	Vasco da Gama Vidigueira	26	10	9	7	35	31	+4	39		4–1	2–2	0–1	0–0	1–1	0–0		1–1	1–1	2–0	4–1	1–0	1–0	3–1
8	Serpa	26	10	6	10	44	36	+8	36 (Note: Serpa are ranked ahead of Oriental Dragon on head-to-head away goals: Serpa 0–1 Oriental Dragon, Oriental Dragon 0–3 Serpa.)		1–1	2–2	2–0	2–2	0–1	2–0	5–3		0–1	1–2	2–4	4–2	2–1	2–1
9	Oriental Dragon (R)	26	10	6	10	33	34	−1	36	Relegation to District Championship	2–1	0–2	1–0	3–0	0–1	1–2	3–1	0–3		2–1	0–2	3–0	1–0	0–1
10	Praiense (R)	26	9	7	10	31	32	−1	34	Relegation to District Championship	0–2	1–0	1–1	0–1	1–1	2–2	0–1	2–0	1–1		0–1	1–1	5–0	1–0
11	Esperança de Lagos (R)	26	7	10	9	28	38	−10	31	Relegation to District Championship	0–2	0–2	0–0	0–0	3–2	1–0	1–1	1–3	2–1	0–1		0–0	0–1	1–1
12	Angrense (R)	26	4	5	17	17	46	−29	17 (Note: Angrense are ranked ahead of Olhanense on goal difference, due to equal head-to-head: Angrense 1–0 Olhanense, Olhanense 1–0 Angrense.)	Relegation to District Championship	0–2	0–2	1–0	0–3	0–0	1–0	1–3	1–0	2–3	1–2	1–1		1–0	2–2
13	Olhanense (R)	26	5	2	19	18	50	−32	17	Relegation to District Championship	0–5	1–2	0–2	0–2	0–2	1–2	2–3	0–3	3–2	1–1	2–3	1–0		1–1
14	Ferreiras (R)	26	3	7	16	17	39	−22	16	Relegation to District Championship	1–2	2–0	0–5	0–1	0–2	1–1	0–0	0–2	1–2	0–1	2–2	2–1	0–1	

Updated to match(es) played on 19 April 2023. Source: FPF.pt
Legend: Blue = home team win; Yellow = draw; Red = away team win.
Rules for classification: 1) Points, 2) Head-to-head points, 3) Head-to-head goal difference, 4) Goal difference, 5) Matches won, 6) Goals scored
(Q) Qualified for the phase indicated; (R) Relegated

== Promotion play-offs ==
=== Serie 1 ===
Pos	Team	Pld	W	D	L	GF	GA	GD	Pts	Qualification	VIA	LUS	AMA	SAL
1	Vianense (P)	6	3	2	1	8	6	+2	11	Promotion to Liga 3		2–1	0–0	3–2
2	Lusitânia Lourosa (P)	6	1	4	1	6	6	0	7	Promotion to Liga 3	0–0		1–0	2–2
3	Amarante	6	1	3	2	2	4	−2	6		1–3	0–0		1–0
4	Salgueiros	6	1	3	2	8	8	0	6		2–0	2–2	0–0	

Updated to match(es) played on 28 May 2023. Source: fpf.pt
Legend: Blue = home team win; Yellow = draw; Red = away team win.
Rules for classification: 1) points, 2) head-to-head points, 3) head-to-head goal difference, 4) goal difference, 5) matches won, 6) goals scored
(P) Promoted

=== Serie 2 ===
Pos	Team	Pld	W	D	L	GF	GA	GD	Pts	Qualification	ATL	1DE	PPI	LUE
1	Atlético (P)	6	3	3	0	10	4	+6	12	Promotion to Liga 3		0–0	2–2	5–1
2	1º Dezembro (P)	6	2	4	0	6	3	+3	10	Promotion to Liga 3	0–0		1–0	3–1
3	Pêro Pinheiro (P)	6	2	2	2	8	7	+1	8	Promotion to Liga 3	1–2	1–1		2–1
4	Lusitano Évora	6	0	1	5	4	14	−10	1		0–1	1–1	0–2	

Updated to match(es) played on 28 May 2023. Source: fpf.pt
Legend: Blue = home team win; Yellow = draw; Red = away team win.
Rules for classification: 1) points, 2) head-to-head points, 3) head-to-head goal difference, 4) goal difference, 5) matches won, 6) goals scored
(P) Promoted

== Third stage ==
=== Championship final ===
11 June 2023
16:00

Atlético	3–0	Vianense
Luisinho 49'; Pipas 60'; Lénio Neves 66'

Estádio Nacional, Oeiras
