= Rui Cardoso =

Rui Cardoso may refer to:

- Rui Cardoso Martins (born 1967), Portuguese writer
- Rui Cardoso (footballer, born May 1994), Portuguese footballer who played as a forward
- Rui Cardoso (politician) (born 2002), Portuguese politician
