= João Sousa (disambiguation) =

João Sousa (born 1989) is a Portuguese tennis player.

João Sousa may also refer to:

- João Sousa (footballer), Portuguese footballer
- João Souza (fencer), Brazilian fencer
