= Nuno Silva =

Nuno Silva may refer to:

- Nuno Silva (footballer, born 1975), Portuguese football player
- Nuno Silva (footballer, born 1986), Portuguese football player
- Nuno Silva (footballer, born 1997), Portuguese football player
