= Espadanedo =

Espadanedo may refer to the following places in Portugal:

- Espadanedo (Cinfães), a parish in the municipality of Cinfães
- Espadanedo (Macedo de Cavaleiros), a parish in the municipality of Macedo de Cavaleiros
