= Joel Sousa =

Portuguese footballer

Personal information
- Full name: Carlos Joel Castro de Sousa
- Date of birth: 17 March 2000 (age 26)
- Place of birth: Tondela, Portugal
- Height: 1.88 m (6 ft 2 in)
- Position: Goalkeeper

Team information
- Current team: Castro Daire
- Number: 99

Youth career
- 2009–2013: Escola Pestinhas
- 2013–2020: Tondela
- 2019–2020: → Molelos (loan)

Senior career*
Years	Team	Apps	(Gls)
2020–2025	Tondela	2	(0)
2021–2022	→ ARC Oleiros (loan)	7	(0)
2025–2026	Lusitano de Évora	0	(0)
2026–	Castro Daire	3	(0)
- * Club domestic league appearances and goals as of 13 September 2026

Carlos Joel Castro de Sousa (born 17 March 2000) is a Portuguese footballer who plays as a goalkeeper for Campeonato de Portugal club Castro Daire.

== Professional career ==
On 10 September 2020, Sousa signed his first professional contract with Tondela, and immediately joined Molelos on loan for the 2019-20 season. He made his professional debut with Tondela in a 1-0 win against Felgueiras for the Taça de Portugal he then played for the first time in the league in a 2-0 Primeira Liga loss to Vitória de Guimarães on 27 November 2020.
