= Estádio da Nora =

Portuguese football stadium

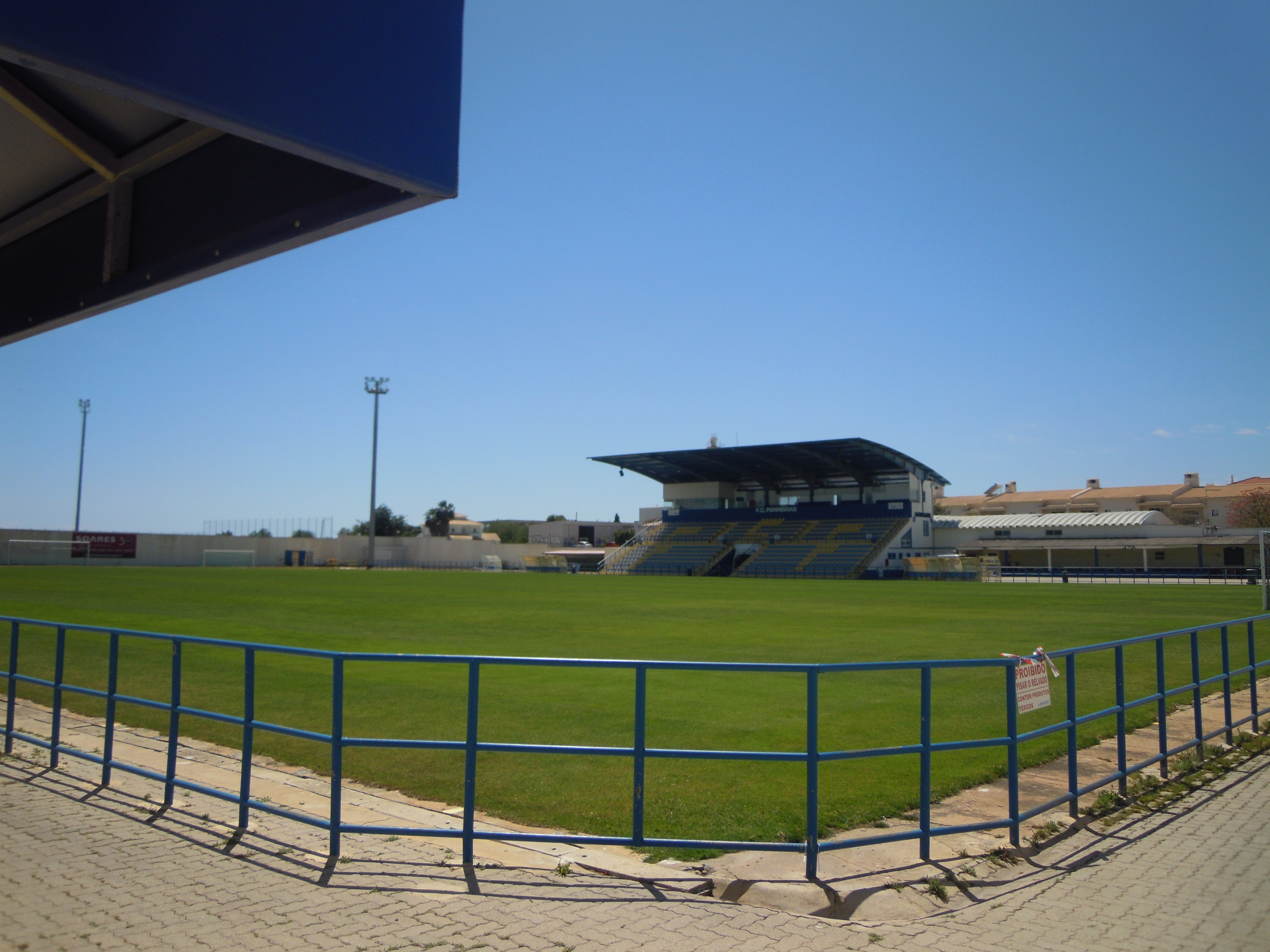
- Interactive map of Estádio da Nora
- Coordinates: 37.124444°N 8.243333°W
- Owner: City of Albufeira
- Capacity: 2,000

Construction
- Built: 1988
- Renovated: 2001

Tenant
- F.C. Ferreiras

Estádio da Nora is a football stadium located in the parish of Ferreiras, municipality of Albufeira, Portugal. It is currently managed and used by FC Ferreiras, which competes in the Algarve 1st District Division championship.

== History ==
In 1986, the Albufeira City Council purchased a plot of land in the Ferreiras area, which was transferred to the newly formed Ferreiras Football Club, to allow for a new stadium to be built on the site. Construction was completed in 1988.

During the following years, several improvements were carried out to upgrade the quality of the stadium, including a wall around the field to enclose the stadium area, new change rooms, a pavilion in the sports grounds, benches and a bar.

On November 15, 2015, the region of the Algarve was hit by bad weather, especially in the Albufeira area. Heavy rainfall caused the stadium field to flood, with the water level reaching 1 meter. The damage was valued at around 100,000 euros, and affected the change rooms, laundry equipment, snack bar, medical station and multiple club cars.
