= João Faria =

Portuguese footballer

Personal information
- Full name: João Carlos Silva Faria
- Date of birth: 12 July 1990 (age 36)
- Place of birth: Barcelos, Portugal
- Height: 1.85 m (6 ft 1 in)
- Position: Centre-back

Team information
- Current team: Vianense
- Number: 12

Youth career
- 2000–2009: Gil Vicente

Senior career*
Years	Team	Apps	(Gls)
2009–2011	Ribeirão	47	(1)
2011–2012	Varzim	32	(7)
2012–2013	Benfica B	1	(0)
2013	Salamanca	3	(0)
2013–2015	Ribeirão	9	(0)
2015–2016	Vilaverdense	25	(4)
2016–2017	Merelinense	33	(6)
2017–2018	Famalicão	35	(1)
2018–2020	Vizela	45	(1)
2020–2021	Trofense	29	(1)
2022	Oliveirense	12	(2)
2022–2023	Varzim	27	(1)
2023–2024	Dumiense	22	(2)
2024–2025	Leixões B	13	(1)
2025	Vilaverdense	14	(1)
2025–	Vianense	27	(1)

International career
2010	Portugal U20	4	(0)
2011	Portugal U21	2	(0)
- * Club domestic league appearances and goals as of 12 September 2026

João Carlos Silva Faria (born 12 July 1990) is a Portuguese professional footballer who plays as a centre-back for Liga 3 club Vianense.

He played 47 games in Portugal's second tier for Benfica B, Famalicão and Trofense, but spent most of his career at a lower level, winning the third division with Varzim in 2012 and Trofense in 2021.

== Club career ==
Born in Barcelos, Faria spent his first three years as a senior in the third division, with G.D. Ribeirão (two seasons) and Varzim SC. In the summer of 2012 he signed with S.L. Benfica, being assigned to the reserve team in the Segunda Liga.

Faria made his debut as a professional on 26 August 2012, appearing in a 2–1 away loss against Associação Naval 1º de Maio. On 28 January of the following year he moved to Spain, agreeing to a three-and-a-half-year contract with Segunda División B club UD Salamanca.

Having played only three games in Spain, Faria returned to Portugal in the summer of 2013 to play in the third tier with Ribeirão, Vilaverdense FC and Merelinense FC. In June 2017 he stepped back up to division two on a two-year deal at F.C. Famalicão. He scored his one goal at the level on 25 November, opening a 6–0 home win over Sporting CP B.

After two years with F.C. Vizela, Faria joined fellow third-tier side C.D. Trofense on 17 May 2020. He won the league title in his first season, and scored the equaliser on 23 August 2021 as they came from behind to defeat F.C. Penafiel 2–1 at home near the start of the new campaign.

On 31 January 2022, Faria signed for U.D. Oliveirense of Liga 3. The season ended in promotion, despite a penalty shootout loss to S.C.U. Torreense in the final.

Faria remained in the third division, returning to Varzim after a decade away on 22 June 2022. On 16 October, at his hometown's Estádio Cidade de Barcelos, he scored the only goal of a victory over Sporting CP in the third round of the Taça de Portugal.

== International career ==
Faria earned six caps for Portugal at under-20 and under-21 level, all in friendly matches on home soil. The first was on 28 January 2010 in a 2–2 draw with China in Óbidos, and the last was on 25 March 2011 in a 2–0 win against the Republic of Ireland.
