= 2023–24 Liga 3 (Portugal) =

3rd season of the Liga 3 (Portugal)

Liga 3
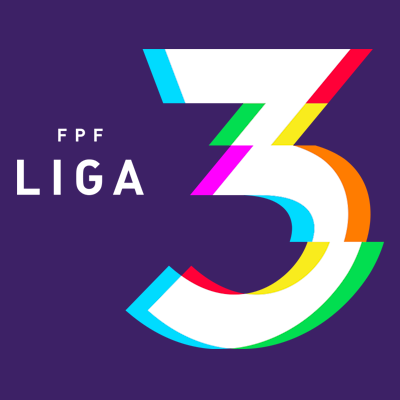
- Season: 2023–24
- Dates: 7 August 2023 – 19 May 2024
- Champions: Alverca
- Promoted: Alverca; Felgueiras
- Relegated: Pêro Pinheiro; Amora; Vianense; Canelas 2010
- Total attendance: 310,805 (296 matches)
- Average attendance: 1,050

The 2023–24 Liga 3 was the third season of Portuguese football's third-tier league, and the 77th season of recognised third-tier football in Portugal. First season with a total of 20 teams compete in this division, after the reduction in the previous edition.

== Format ==
This competition consists of a first stage with all the teams then proceed to a promotion or relegation series depending on their performance.

== Teams ==
A total of 20 teams contested the league, including 3 teams relegated from the 2022–23 Liga Portugal 2, 13 teams that have been in 2022–23 Liga 3 and 4 teams promoted from the 2022–23 Campeonato de Portugal.

B-SAD sports society's licence was relocated to Cova da Piedade, as a result of a fusion. On 13 July 2023, the Portuguese Football Federation informed that Cova da Piedade failed to obtain a licence to play in Liga 3, being replaced by the best placed team in 2022–23 Campeonato de Portugal that wasn't promoted: Pêro Pinheiro.

=== Team changes ===
Relegated from 2022–23 Liga Portugal 2

- ~~Cova da Piedade (B-SAD licence)~~
- Sp. Covilhã
- Trofense

Promoted from 2022–23 Campeonato de Portugal

- 1.º Dezembro
- Atlético CP
- Lusitânia Lourosa
- Pêro Pinheiro
- Vianense

Promoted to 2023–24 Liga Portugal 2

- Belenenses
- Länk Vilaverdense
- União de Leiria

Relegated to 2023–24 Campeonato de Portugal

- Fontinhas
- Moncarapachense
- Montalegre
- Paredes
- Real SC
- São João de Ver
- Vitória de Setúbal
- Vitória de Guimarães B

=== Stadium and locations ===
Location of teams in 2023-24 Liga 3

Team	Location	Stadium	Capacity	2022–23 finish
Trofense	Trofa	Estádio do CD Trofense	5,017	17th LP2
Sp. Covilhã	Covilhã	Estádio Municipal; José dos Santos Pinto	3,500	18th LP2
Braga B	Braga	Complexo Desportivo de Fão	724	2nd Promotion S1
Alverca	Vila Franca de Xira	Complexo Desportivo do FC Alverca	7,705	3rd Promotion S1
Sanjoanense	São João da Madeira	Estádio Conde Dias Garcia	8,500	3rd Promotion S2
Felgueiras	Felgueiras	Estádio Dr. Machado de Matos	7,540	4th Promotion S1
Amora	Seixal	Estádio da Medideira	1,500	4th Promotion S2
Varzim	Póvoa de Varzim	Estádio do Varzim SC	7,280	1st Relegation S1
Canelas	Vila Nova de Gaia	Estádio do Canelas; Gaia Futebol Clube	7,000	1st Relegation S2
Sporting B	Alcochete	Estádio Aurélio Pereira	1,180	1st Relegation S3
Académica	Coimbra	Estádio Cidade de Coimbra	29,622	1st Relegation S4
Fafe	Fafe	Estádio Municipal de Fafe	4,000	2nd Relegation S1
Anadia	Anadia	Estádio Municipal Eng.º; Sílvio Henriques Cerveira	6,500	2nd Relegation S2
Oliveira do Hospital	Oliveira do Hospital	Estádio Municipal de Tábua	3,500	2nd Relegation S3
Caldas	Caldas da Rainha	Campo da Mata	5,700	2nd Relegation S4
Atlético CP	Lisbon	Estádio da Tapadinha	4,000	CP Champions; 1st CP Promotion S2
Vianense	Viana do Castelo	Estádio Dr. José de Matos	3,000	1st CP Promotion S1
Lusitânia Lourosa	Santa Maria da Feira	Estádio do Lusitânia FC Lourosa	8,000	2nd CP Promotion S1
1.º Dezembro	Sintra	Campo Conde de Sucena	1,000	2nd CP Promotion S2
Pêro Pinheiro	Sintra	Parque de Jogos Pardal Monteiro	3,000	3rd CP Promotion S2

== First stage ==
In the first stage, the 20 clubs will be divided in two series (Série A and B) of 10 teams, according to geographic criteria.

=== Série A ===
Pos	Team	Pld	W	D	L	GF	GA	GD	Pts	Qualification	FEL	LUS	VAR	BRA	CAN	FAF	TRO	ANA	SAN	VIA
1	Felgueiras 1932	18	13	2	3	35	11	+24	41	Advance to Promotion Series		2–1	2–0	1–0	1–0	1–0	1–0	2–3	3–0	2–0
2	Lusitânia Lourosa	18	8	7	3	32	15	+17	31	Advance to Promotion Series	0–0		1–1	5–0	4–0	2–3	1–1	4–0	1–1	2–1
3	Varzim	18	8	4	6	19	17	+2	28	Advance to Promotion Series	1–0	3–0		1–0	1–1	0–1	1–2	2–1	2–1	2–0
4	Braga B	18	8	3	7	26	22	+4	27	Advance to Promotion Series	3–3	0–1	2–0		1–0	0–0	2–0	4–0	4–1	0–3
5	Canelas 2010	18	7	4	7	21	28	−7	25	Advance to Relegation Series	0–8	0–2	2–0	1–3		3–1	1–0	3–2	1–2	2–1
6	Fafe	18	6	6	6	13	19	−6	24	Advance to Relegation Series	0–3	0–3	0–0	0–0	0–0		2–1	1–2	1–1	0–1
7	Trofense	18	6	5	7	18	20	−2	20 (Note: Trofense was deducted 3 points for financial irregularities.)	Advance to Relegation Series	2–0	1–3	0–0	1–0	1–1	0–1		1–0	1–0	1–1
8	Anadia	18	6	2	10	25	32	−7	20	Advance to Relegation Series	0–1	0–0	3–0	3–1	1–4	0–1	3–3		1–2	2–0
9	Sanjoanense	18	5	4	9	20	34	−14	19	Advance to Relegation Series	0–3	1–1	0–3	2–4	0–3	1–1	3–2	2–1		2–1
10	Vianense	18	3	3	12	14	25	−11	12	Advance to Relegation Series	1–2	1–1	1–2	0–2	0–0	0–1	0–1	1–2	2–1	

Updated to match(es) played on 28 January 2024. Source: Liga 3
Rules for classification: 1) points, 2) head-to-head points, 3) head-to-head goal difference, 4) goal difference, 5) matches won, 6) goals scored

=== Série B ===
Pos	Team	Pld	W	D	L	GF	GA	GD	Pts	Qualification	ACA	ATL	ALV	SPC	SPO	CAL	OLI	AMO	PER	1DE
1	Académica	18	9	5	4	27	17	+10	32	Advance to Promotion Series		2–2	2–0	0–2	0–0	0–1	1–0	1–1	3–0	1–1
2	Atlético CP	18	8	7	3	28	19	+9	31 (Note: Ranked on head-to-head: Atlético CP 3–1 Alverca, Alverca 1–1 Atlético CP.)	Advance to Promotion Series	2–1		3–1	1–1	0–2	0–2	1–0	1–0	2–0	3–0
3	Alverca	18	9	4	5	27	19	+8	31	Advance to Promotion Series	1–2	1–1		2–2	1–0	1–1	1–0	1–0	3–0	2–0
4	Sp. Covilhã	18	8	6	4	32	21	+11	30 (Note: Ranked on head-to-head: Sp. Covilhã 3–0 Sporting B, Sporting B 2–2 Sp. Covilhã.)	Advance to Promotion Series	3–2	1–1	1–2		3–0	4–3	0–3	2–0	2–0	0–0
5	Sporting B	18	9	3	6	24	20	+4	30	Advance to Relegation Series	1–2	2–1	2–1	2–2		1–3	2–0	1–0	2–0	2–0
6	Caldas	18	8	5	5	31	26	+5	29	Advance to Relegation Series	1–2	3–3	1–0	2–1	1–0		1–1	2–2	1–2	2–0
7	Oliveira do Hospital	18	5	5	8	15	21	−6	20	Advance to Relegation Series	1–1	0–3	1–1	2–1	0–1	2–1		0–4	1–1	1–1
8	Amora	18	4	6	8	21	24	−3	18	Advance to Relegation Series	0–2	1–1	1–3	1–1	3–2	2–2	0–1		3–0	0–2
9	Pêro Pinheiro	18	3	4	11	16	37	−21	13	Advance to Relegation Series	1–4	1–1	1–2	0–4	3–3	1–2	1–0	2–3		2–0
10	1º Dezembro	18	2	5	11	11	28	−17	11	Advance to Relegation Series	0–1	1–2	1–4	0–2	0–1	3–2	0–2	0–0	1–1	

Updated to match(es) played on 27 January 2024. Source: Liga 3
Rules for classification: 1) points, 2) head-to-head points, 3) head-to-head goal difference, 4) goal difference, 5) matches won, 6) goals scored

== Second stage ==
=== Promotion stage ===
The eight qualified teams of each series will playing against each other in a home-and-away double round-robin system. The winners and runner-ups of the series will be automatically promoted to Liga Portugal 2. The third placed team will face the 16th placed of Liga Portugal 2 for the last spot in Liga Portugal 2.

Pos	Team	Pld	W	D	L	GF	GA	GD	Pts	Promotion or qualification	ALV	FEL	LUS	BRA	ACA	VAR	ATL	SPC
1	Alverca (C, P)	14	9	3	2	22	9	+13	30	Promotion to Liga Portugal 2		1–1	3–1	1–0	2–1	1–0	2–0	1–0
2	Felgueiras 1932 (P)	14	6	6	2	21	11	+10	24	Promotion to Liga Portugal 2	1–1		2–0	1–1	1–1	1–0	3–0	2–0
3	Lusitânia Lourosa	14	7	2	5	22	21	+1	23 (Note: Ranked on head-to-head: Lusitânia CP 3–2 Braga B, Braga B 2–2 Lusitânia.)	Advance to Playoff	3–2	1–0		3–2	2–1	1–0	3–1	2–2
4	Braga B	14	6	5	3	19	14	+5	23		2–1	2–1	2–2		1–1	2–1	0–0	0–0
5	Académica	14	3	7	4	15	16	−1	16		0–0	1–1	1–0	0–3		2–3	1–1	0–0
6	Varzim	14	4	2	8	17	22	−5	14		0–1	2–4	4–3	2–0	0–2		1–1	2–0
7	Atlético CP	14	2	5	7	11	24	−13	11		0–4	1–1	1–0	0–2	1–3	2–0		1–2
8	Sp. Covilhã	14	1	6	7	10	20	−10	9		0–2	0–2	0–1	1–2	1–1	2–2	2–2	

Updated to match(es) played on 19 May 2024. Source: Liga 3
Rules for classification: 1) points, 2) head-to-head points, 3) head-to-head goal difference, 4) goal difference, 5) matches won, 6) goals scored
(C) Champions; (P) Promoted

=== Relegation stage ===
The bottom 12 teams are divided in two series of 6 teams, playing against each other in a home-and-away double round-robin system. To account for their performance in the first stage, teams will start with bonification points, with 5th placed teams starting with 6 points and 10th placed teams starting with 1. The bottom two teams of each series will be relegated to Campeonato de Portugal.

==== Serie 1 ====
Pos	Team	Pld	W	D	L	GF	GA	GD	Pts	Relegation	FAF	TRO	SAN	ANA	CAN	VIA
1	Fafe	10	7	0	3	20	11	+9	26			2–3	0–2	1–0	2–1	2–0
2	Trofense	10	4	4	2	16	11	+5	20		1–3		1–2	0–0	4–1	1–0
3	Sanjoanense	10	4	4	2	13	11	+2	18		4–2	0–3		0–0	1–1	1–1
4	Anadia	10	3	3	4	6	10	−4	15		0–4	1–1	1–2		1–0	2–0
5	Canelas (R)	10	1	4	5	8	15	−7	13	Relegation to District Championships	0–2	1–1	1–1	2–0		1–3
6	Vianense (R)	10	2	3	5	6	11	−5	10	Relegation to Campeonato de Portugal	0–2	1–1	1–0	0–1	0–0	

Updated to match(es) played on 4 May 2024. Source: Liga 3
Rules for classification: 1) points, 2) head-to-head points, 3) head-to-head goal difference, 4) goal difference, 5) matches won, 6) goals scored
(R) Relegated

==== Serie 2 ====
Pos	Team	Pld	W	D	L	GF	GA	GD	Pts	Relegation	SPO	CAL	OLI	1DE	AMO	PER
1	Sporting B	10	6	2	2	19	5	+14	26			3–0	1–1	0–0	5–0	1–0
2	Caldas	10	5	2	3	14	13	+1	22		1–0		1–1	2–1	1–2	4–1
3	Oliveira do Hospital	10	4	2	4	14	12	+2	18		0–2	3–1		1–0	4–0	2–0
4	1º Dezembro	10	5	1	4	10	9	+1	17		1–4	0–1	2–0		1–0	1–0
5	Amora (R)	10	4	1	5	11	17	−6	16	Relegation to Campeonato de Portugal	1–3	1–1	2–0	0–1		4–1
6	Pêro Pinheiro (R)	10	2	0	8	8	20	−12	8	Relegation to Campeonato de Portugal	1–0	1–2	3–2	1–3	0–1	

Updated to match(es) played on 4 May 2024. Source: Liga 3
Rules for classification: 1) points, 2) head-to-head points, 3) head-to-head goal difference, 4) goal difference, 5) matches won, 6) goals scored
(R) Relegated

== Number of teams by district ==
Rank	District Football Associations	Number	Teams
1	Lisbon	5	1.º Dezembro, Atlético CP, Alverca, Pêro Pinheiro and Sporting B
2	Porto	4	Canelas, Felgueiras, Trofense and Varzim
3	Aveiro	3	Anadia, Lusitânia Lourosa and Sanjoanense
4	Braga	2	Braga B and Fafe
4	Coimbra	2	Académica and Oliveira do Hospital
6	Castelo Branco	1	Sp. Covilhã
6	Leiria	1	Caldas
6	Setúbal	1	Amora
6	Viana do Castelo	1	Vianense
