= Santiago de Piães =

- Civil parish
- Coat of arms

- Location in Portugal
- Coordinates: 41.065°N 8.155°W
- Country: Portugal
- Region: Norte
- Intermunic. comm.: Tâmega e Sousa
- District: Viseu
- Municipality: Cinfães

Area
  - Total: 17.59 km^{2} (6.79 sq mi)
- Elevation: 464 m (1,522 ft)

Population (2011)
  - Total: 1,797
  - Density: 102.2/km^{2} (264.6/sq mi)
- Time zone: UTC+00:00 (WET)
  - Summer (DST): UTC+01:00 (WEST)
- Postal code: 4690
- Area code: 255
- Patron: Santiago Maior

Santiago de Piães is a Portuguese civil parish (freguesia) in the municipality of Cinfães. The population in 2011 was 1,797, in an area of 17.59 km^{2} (6.79 sq mi). The parish contains the localities Cosconhe, Crasto, Lage, Santiago de Piães, Santo António, Sanfins, Ventoselas and Vilar d'Arca.

== History ==
The presence of primitive tribes in this region is reflected in the local toponymy (such as Castro, Cristelo, Cabruela and Concela). Similarly, the Roman occupation is reflected in nuclei such as Vilar de Arca, Cimo de Vila, Cabo de Vila, Vila Verde, Vila de Antomil, Casal Joane, Casal Seco a Póvoa, while Moorish influence is reflected in Outeiro do Mouro and Lapa da Moura, and Christian influences in Sanfins (São Felix), Santa Comba and São Pedro a São Martinho (reflecting the influences of these groups). Before the 12th century, Santiago de Piães was the centre of the medieval magistrium in Sanfins(San Fiiz or Sancti Felicis).

The castro and the civitas (dating to the 9th century) was not linked to the castro of Castelo de S. Paio (located in the neighbouring parish of São Cristovão de Nogueira), and medieval centre of São Salvador. Sanfins was the seat of the medieval municipality, even as Casconha attracted most of the nobility, after Egas Moniz raised Afonso Henriques in the municipality. The zone was the site of the Casa da Câmara e de Audiências, but also aldermen of many of the nearby parishes had homes in this parish (as was typical in the Nespereira valley).
