= Henrique Brito =

Portuguese footballer

Personal information
- Full name: Henrique Jorge Pereira Brito
- Date of birth: 21 April 1997 (age 29)
- Place of birth: Braga, Portugal
- Height: 1.76 m (5 ft 9 1/2 in)
- Position: Left back

Team information
- Current team: Vianense
- Number: 21

Youth career
- 2008–2009: Maximinense
- 2009–2010: Bragafut
- 2010–2012: Braga
- 2012: FC Ferreirense
- 2012–2014: Sporting Braga
- 2014–2016: Gil Vicente

Senior career*
| Years | Team | Apps | (Gls) |
| 2016–2019 | Gil Vicente | 66 | (3) |
| 2020–2021 | Amora | 17 | (0) |
| 2021–2024 | Felgueiras | 47 | (1) |
| 2024 | Paredes | 11 | (0) |
| 2025– | Vianense | 30 | (0) |
- * Club domestic league appearances and goals as of 12 September 2026

Henrique Jorge Pereira Brito (born 21 April 1997) is a professional footballer who plays as a defender for Liga 3 club Vianense. Born in Portugal, he represents Cape Verde internationally.

== Football career ==
On 30 July 2016, Brito made his professional debut with Gil Vicente in a 2016–17 Taça da Liga match against Académica.

== International career ==
Born in Portugal, Brito is of Cape Verdean descent. He was called up to represent the Cape Verde national team for 2022 FIFA World Cup qualification matches in September 2021. In the match against Nigeria, he is part of the substitution.
