= Vítor São Bento =

Portuguese footballer

Personal information
- Full name: Vítor Emanuel Gonçalves São Bento
- Date of birth: 9 August 1992 (age 34)
- Place of birth: Galegos, Portugal
- Height: 1.90 m (6 ft 3 in)
- Position: Goalkeeper

Team information
- Current team: Vianense
- Number: 16

Youth career
- 2001–2008: Santa Maria
- 2008–2009: Braga
- 2009–2010: Aves
- 2010–2011: Varzim

Senior career*
Years	Team	Apps	(Gls)
2011–2012	Varzim	1	(0)
2012–2013	Stª Eulália Vizela	6	(0)
2013–2016	Farense	64	(0)
2016–2017	Nacional	2	(0)
2017–2019	Covilhã	40	(0)
2019–2021	Xanthi	12	(0)
2021	Estrela Amadora	5	(0)
2022	Trofense	1	(0)
2022–2023	Covilhã	5	(0)
2023–2024	Felgueiras 1932	5	(0)
2024–2025	Marco 09	30	(0)
2025–2026	Leça	3	(0)
2026–	Vianense	0	(0)
- * Club domestic league appearances and goals as of 12 September 2026

Vítor Emanuel Gonçalves São Bento (born 9 August 1992) is a Portuguese professional footballer who plays as a goalkeeper for Liga 3 club Vianense.

== Club career ==
=== Portugal ===
Born in Galegos (Santa Maria), Barcelos, São Bento played youth football with four clubs, including local Santa Maria F.C. from ages 9 to 16. His senior debut was made with Varzim SC, in the third division.

São Bento signed with S.C. Farense of the Segunda Liga in 2013. His first match in the competition occurred on 11 May 2014, in a 2–1 away loss against S.C. Beira-Mar which was his only appearance of the season.

In the 2015–16 campaign, São Bento only missed three games in 46 but the Algarve side finished in 20th position and were relegated. In January 2016, he was voted Best Young Player for the previous month.

On 31 May 2016, São Bento joined C.D. Nacional on a four-year contract. Nearly one year later, as his team had already been relegated, he made his Primeira Liga debut, replacing the habitual starter Adriano Facchini midway through the second half of the 2–2 away draw with Boavista FC.

São Bento returned to the second tier for 2017–18, agreeing to a deal at S.C. Covilhã.

=== Xanthi ===
On 14 June 2019, São Bento moved abroad for the first time in his career, signing a contract with Xanthi FC. His maiden Super League Greece appearance took place on 31 August, in a 2–1 away win over Panetolikos FC; he and his compatriot Fábio Sturgeon were relegated at the end of the season, as the club had been deducted 12 points for joint ownership.

São Bento totalled 18 games in his two-year spell in Western Thrace.

=== Later career ===
São Bento competed in the Portuguese second division from 2021 to 2023, with C.F. Estrela da Amadora, C.D. Trofense and Covilhã. Subsequently, he returned to the lower leagues.
