= Gabi Faria =

Portuguese footballer

Personal information
- Full name: Gabriel José Gomes Faria
- Date of birth: 1 August 1994 (age 32)
- Place of birth: Barcelos, Portugal
- Height: 1.79 m (5 ft 10 in)
- Position: Right-back

Team information
- Current team: Vianense
- Number: 19

Youth career
- 2004–2013: Gil Vicente

Senior career*
Years	Team	Apps	(Gls)
2013–2016	Gil Vicente	0	(0)
2013–2014	→ Salgueiros (loan)	12	(0)
2014–2015	→ Vilaverdense (loan)	19	(0)
2016–2017	Vilaverdense	13	(1)
2017–2018	Vizela	10	(1)
2018–2019	Vilaverdense	30	(1)
2019–2020	Merelinense	17	(2)
2020–2021	Valadares Gaia	10	(0)
2021–2022	Vilaverdense	29	(0)
2022–	Vianense	110	(6)
- * Club domestic league appearances and goals as of 12 September 2026

Gabriel José Gomes Faria (born 1 August 1994) known as Gabi Faria, is a Portuguese footballer who plays for Liga 3 club Vianense as a defender.

== Football career ==
On 2 August 2015, Gaby made his professional debut with Gil Vicente in a 2015–16 Taça da Liga match against Académico Viseu.
