= Khalid Hachadi =

Moroccan footballer

Personal information
- Date of birth: 3 March 1998 (age 28)
- Place of birth: Morocco
- Height: 1.90 m (6 ft 3 in)
- Position: Striker

Team information
- Current team: Vianense
- Number: 17

Senior career*
| Years | Team | Apps | (Gls) |
| 2017–2019 | OKG | 39 | (13) |
| 2019–2020 | Vitória FC | 18 | (1) |
| 2020–2023 | Chabab Mohammedia | 22 | (0) |
| 2021–2022 | → El Gaish (loan) | 8 | (0) |
| 2023–2024 | Alverca | 28 | (3) |
| 2024–2025 | Académica de Coimbra | 28 | (7) |
| 2025–2026 | Trofense | 20 | (0) |
| 2026– | Vianense | 5 | (1) |

International career
| 2017 | Morocco U20 | 2 | (0) |
| 2018–2019 | Morocco U23 | 3 | (0) |
- * Club domestic league appearances and goals as of 12 September 2026

Khalid Hachadi (Arabic: خالد حشادي; born 3 May 1998) is a Moroccan professional footballer who plays as a striker for Portuguese Liga 3 club Vianense.

== Professional career ==
On 14 June 2019, Hachadi signed a professional contract with Vitória FC in the Primeira Liga.

== International career ==
Hachadi is a youth international for Morocco.
