= Pedro Soares (footballer, born 1999) =

Brazilian footballer

Personal information
- Full name: Pedro Augusto Ferreira Soares
- Date of birth: 30 March 1999 (age 27)
- Place of birth: Penafiel, Portugal
- Height: 1.84 m (6 ft 0 in)
- Position: Forward

Team information
- Current team: Vianense
- Number: 9

Youth career
- 2007–2014: Penafiel
- 2014–2015: Palmeiras FC
- 2015–2017: Braga
- 2017–2018: Leixões

Senior career*
Years	Team	Apps	(Gls)
2018–2019	Leixões	0	(0)
2018–2019	→ Benfica B (loan)	18	(2)
2019–2020	Aves B	31	(3)
2020	Aves	9	(0)
2020–2021	Penafiel	24	(2)
2021–2022	Vitória Guimarães B	18	(0)
2022–2023	Real	13	(0)
2023	Fafe	9	(2)
2023–2024	Amarante	30	(4)
2024–2025	Salgueiros	33	(9)
2026	Marco 09	14	(1)
2026–	Vianense	5	(2)
- * Club domestic league appearances and goals as of 12 September 2026

Pedro Augusto Ferreira Soares (born 30 March 1999) is a Portuguese professional footballer who plays as a forward for Liga 3 club Vianense.

== Career ==
On 1 August 2019, Soares signed a professional contract with Aves. Soares made his professional debut with Aves in a 2–0 Primeira Liga loss to C.D. Tondela on 11 June 2020.

On 24 August 2021, he joined Vitória Guimarães B on a two-year deal.
