= Rui Cardoso (footballer, born 1994) =

Portuguese footballer

Personal information
- Full name: Rui Filipe Costa Cardoso
- Date of birth: 11 May 1994 (age 32)
- Place of birth: Cinfães, Portugal
- Height: 1.83 m (6 ft 0 in)
- Position: Forward

Team information
- Current team: Castro Daire
- Number: 88

Youth career
- 2002–2008: Cinfães
- 2008–2009: Leixões
- 2009–2010: Padroense
- 2010–2012: Porto
- 2012: Leixões

Senior career*
| Years | Team | Apps | (Gls) |
| 2013–2017 | Leixões | 59 | (2) |
| 2017–2018 | São Martinho | 24 | (2) |
| 2018–2019 | Cinfães | 28 | (2) |
| 2019–2020 | Sanjoanense | 0 | (0) |
| 2020– | Castro Daire | 8 | (0) |
- * Club domestic league appearances and goals as of 26 January 2021

Rui Filipe da Costa Cardoso (born 11 May 1994) is a Portuguese footballer who plays for A.D. Castro Daire as a forward.

== Career ==
On 6 November 2013, Cardoso made his professional debut with Leixões in a 2013–14 Segunda Liga match against Santa Clara, when he replaced Mailó (79th minute).
