= João Sousa (footballer) =

Portuguese footballer

Personal information
- Full name: João Guilherme Gonçalves de Sousa
- Date of birth: 13 May 1994 (age 32)
- Place of birth: Belas, Portugal
- Height: 1.90 m (6 ft 3 in)
- Position: Centre-back

Team information
- Current team: Arronches e Benfica

Youth career
- 2004–2013: Real Massamá

Senior career*
Years	Team	Apps	(Gls)
2013–2015	Real Massamá	42	(2)
2015–2018	Moreirense	3	(0)
2016–2017	→ Vizela (loan)	28	(1)
2018	→ Oliveirense (loan)	2	(0)
2018–2019	Fafe	33	(2)
2019–2020	Louletano	24	(1)
2020–2021	Amora	25	(3)
2021–2022	Alverca	20	(0)
2022–2023	Belenenses	15	(0)
2023–2024	Amora	21	(0)
2024	Barreirense	12	(0)
2025	Arronches e Benfica	14	(0)
2025	Eléctrico	3	(0)
2025–	Arronches e Benfica	3	(0)
- * Club domestic league appearances and goals as of 11:11, 9 December 2025 (UTC)

João Guilherme Gonçalves de Sousa (born 13 May 1994) is a Portuguese footballer who plays as a central defender for Sport Arronches e Benfica.

== Club career ==
Born in Belas, Sintra, Lisbon District, Sousa moved straight into the Primeira Liga from amateur football in the 2015 January transfer window, when he signed with Moreirense F.C. from Real SC. He made his debut in the former competition on 23 May of that year, coming on as a 78th-minute substitute in a 2–1 away win against F.C. Arouca that was his only appearance of the season.
