= Cinfães =

- Municipality
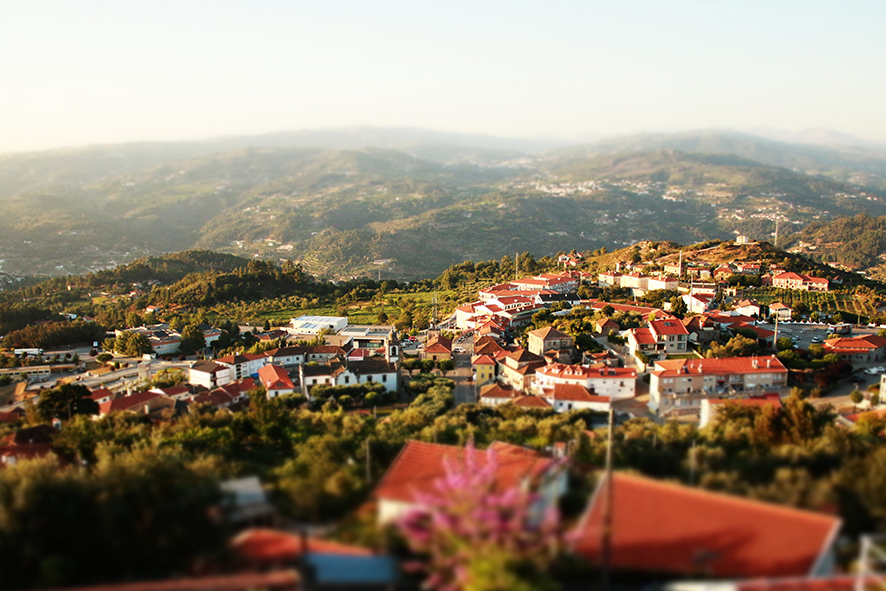
- View of Cinfães

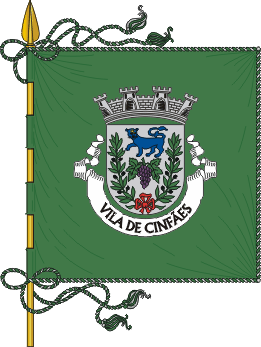
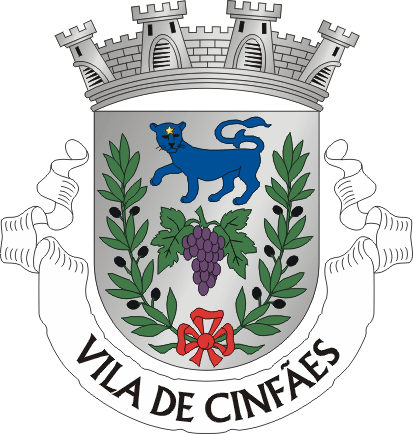
- Flag Coat of arms
- Interactive map of Cinfães
- Location in Portugal
- Coordinates: 41°06′N 8°08′W
- Country: Portugal
- Region: Norte
- Intermunic. comm.: Tâmega e Sousa
- District: Viseu
- Parishes: 14

Government
  - President: Carlos Cardoso (PS)

Area
  - Total: 239.29 km^{2} (92.39 sq mi)

Population (2024)
  - Total: 17,293
  - Density: 72.268/km^{2} (187.17/sq mi)
- Time zone: UTC+00:00 (WET)
  - Summer (DST): UTC+01:00 (WEST)
- Website: www.cm-cinfaes.pt

Cinfães (European Portuguese pronunciation: [sĩˈfɐ̃jʃ]) is a town and municipality on the southern bank of the Douro in the District of Viseu, in Northern Portugal. The town proper had 3,080 inhabitants as of 2021, while the municipality had a population of 17,293 as of 2024, across an area of 239.29 square kilometres (92.39 mi^{2}). Cinfães occupies a predominantly rural territory, and its landscape is marked by rugged and uneven relief, such as the Montemuro mountain range.

The present mayor is Carlos Cardoso, elected by the Socialist Party. The municipal holiday is June 24 (St. John's day).

== History ==
Cinfães' history is linked to the first king of Portugal, Afonso Henriques and several noblemen of his entourage, like the server Egas Moniz. Cinfães received its foral (royal charter) from Manuel I in 1513. In Cinfães existed several fortified houses or towers like "Torre da Chã" destroyed during the first half of the 20th century.

The village of Sanfins in the modern day municipality of Cinfães, received a foral in 1514 and was its own municipality until 1855.

In 1941, a winter storm in Portugal caused significant damages in Cinfães and led to two recorded deaths in the village of Gralheira.

== Geography ==
Cinfães is located in northern Portugal, approximately 75 kilometres (47 mi) east of Porto, within the District of Viseu and the Tâmega e Sousa subregion. The municipality covers an area of 239.29 square kilometres (92.39 mi^{2}) and it is bounded by the Douro River to the north, the Paiva to the west and the Cabrum to the east. Administratively, it is bordered by Baião and Marco de Canaveses to the north, Resende to the east, Castro Daire to the southeast, Arouca to the southwest and Castelo de Paiva to the west.

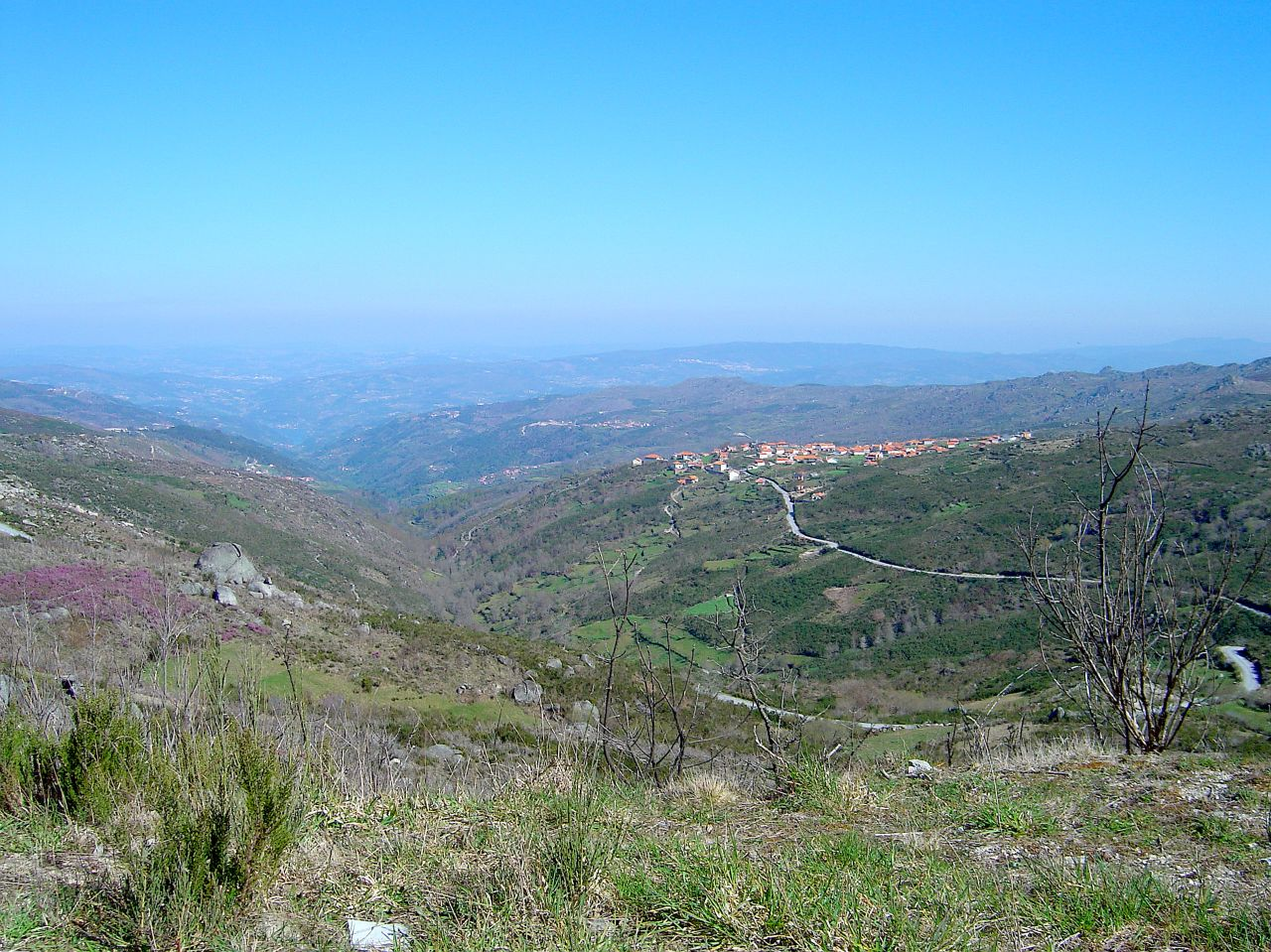
Montemuro mountain range

The landscape of Cinfães is predominantly rural and marked by a rugged and uneven relief, composed of steep slopes and narrow, linear valleys shaped by long-term tectonic activity. In the southeast of the municipality, lies the Montemuro mountain range, reaching 1,381 metres (4,531 ft), near the border with Castro Daire.

The town of Cinfães lies near the confluence of the Douro and Bestança rivers. The later flows through the municipality in a north-northwest to south-southeast direction and its valley hosts agricultural fields and vineyards.

=== Parishes ===
Administratively, the municipality is divided into 14 civil parishes (freguesias):

- Alhões, Bustelo, Gralheira e Ramires
- Cinfães
- Espadanedo
- Ferreiros de Tendais
- Fornelos
- Moimenta
- Nespereira
- Oliveira do Douro
- Santiago de Piães
- São Cristóvão de Nogueira
- Souselo
- Tarouquela
- Tendais
- Travanca

=== Climate ===
Climate conditions vary with altitude and exposure. Average annual temperatures are around 12.5 °C (54.5 °F), with colder conditions on the higher slopes of Montemuro and warmer summers along the Douro Valley. Precipitation ranges from roughly 1,200 millimetres (47 in) per year in the lower river basins to more than 2,500 millimetres (98 in) in the mountains.

== Landmarks ==
It has an important heritage resource, especially the Romanesque churches such as St. Cristóvão de Nogueira; Santa Maria Maior de Tarouquela, Igreja do Escamarão, Ermida do Douro among many important others churches, specially dated to the Baroque period, like the one of São Pedro of Ferreiros de Tendais, and Santa Cristina of Tendais.

== Sport ==
Cinfães is home to the football team Cinfães, who play at the Estádio Municipal Cerveira Pinto.

== Notable people ==
- Alexandre de Serpa Pinto (1846 at the castle of Polchras in Tendais – 1900) Viscount of Serpa Pinto, a Portuguese explorer of southern Africa and a colonial administrator; Governor of Cape Verde, 1894/8.
- Jorge Leitão (born 1974) a former footballer with 479 club appearances.
- Rui Cardoso (born 1994) a footballer with over 100 club caps.
