= Brito (Guimarães) =

- Civil parish
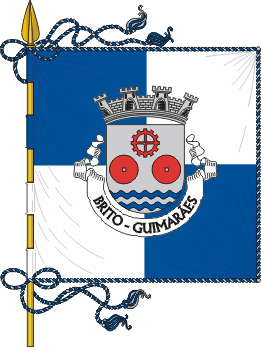
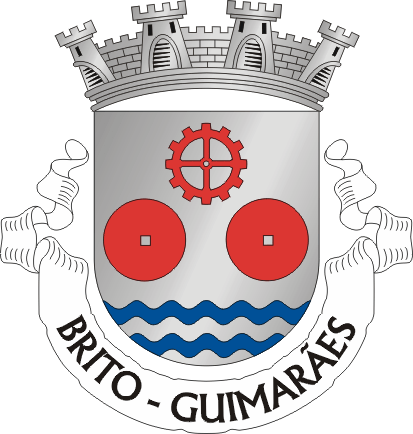
- Flag Coat of arms

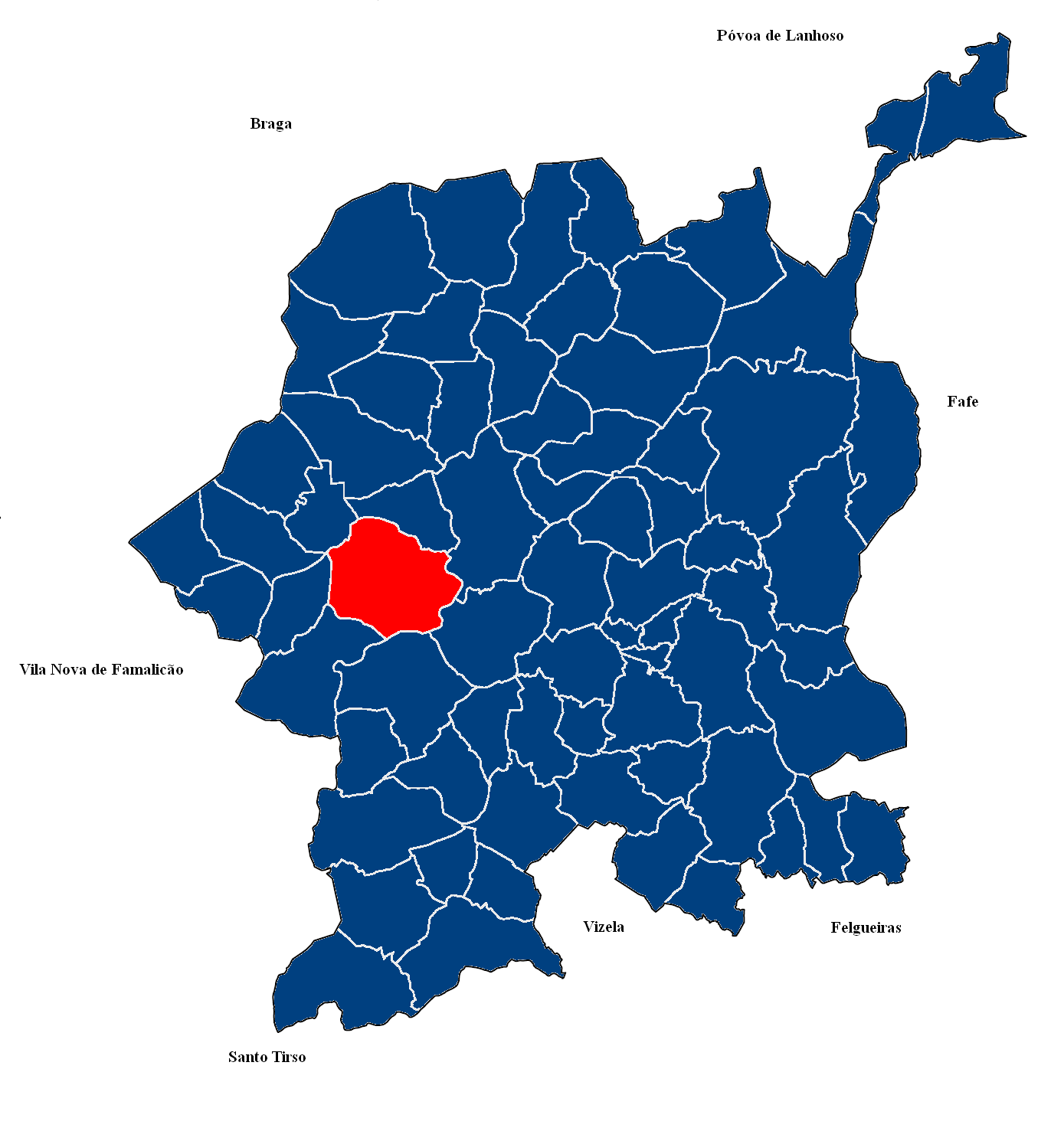
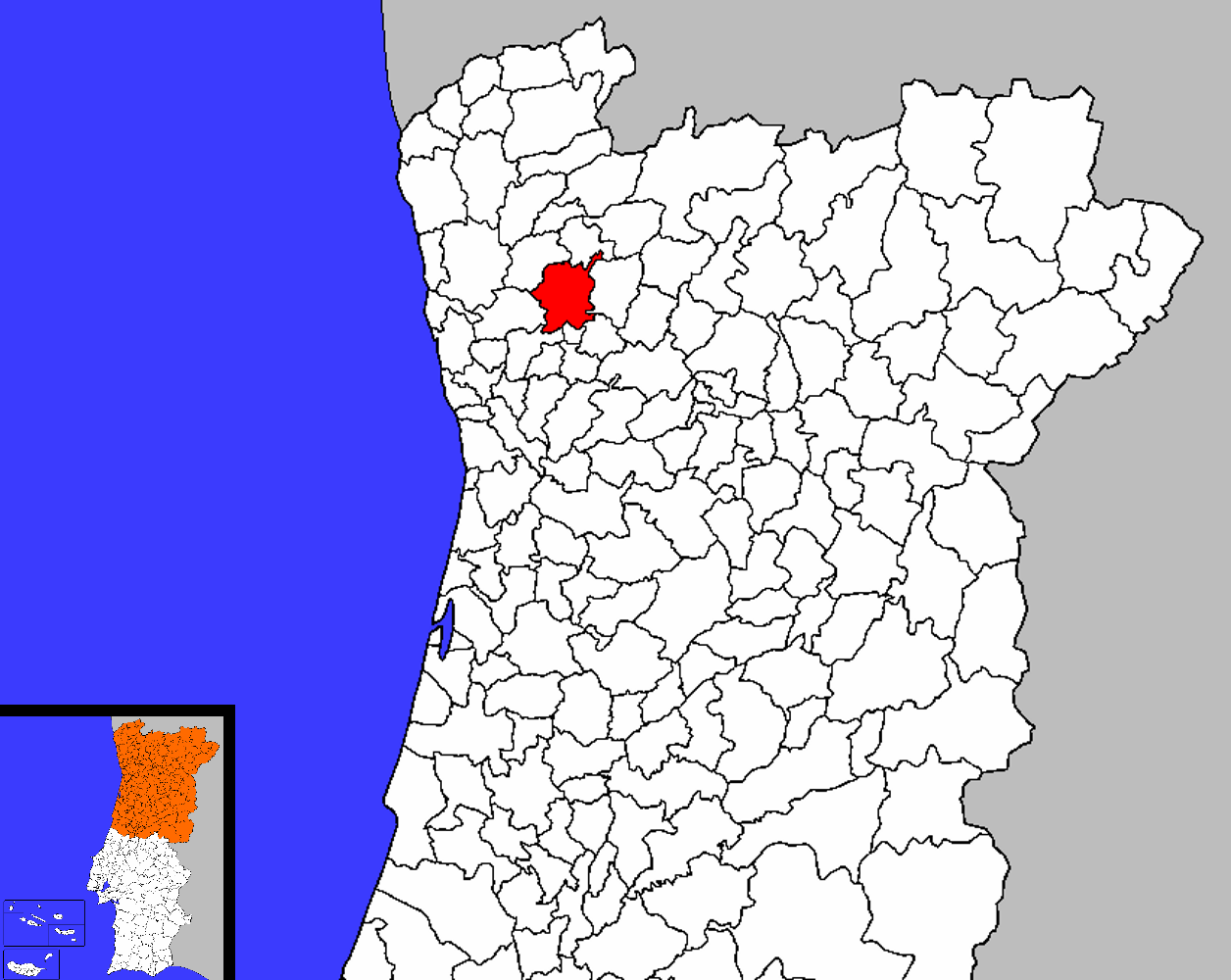
- Coordinates: 41.453°N 8.366°W
- Country: Portugal
- Region: Norte
- Intermunic. comm.: Ave
- District: Braga
- Municipality: Guimarães

Area
  - Total: 5.90 km^{2} (2.28 sq mi)

Population (2021)
  - Total: 4,775
  - Density: 810/km^{2} (2,100/sq mi)
- Time zone: UTC+00:00 (WET)
  - Summer (DST): UTC+01:00 (WEST)
- Website: Junta de freguesia de Brito

Brito is a civil parish in the municipality of Guimarães in the Braga District of Portugal. The population in 2021 was 4,775, in an area of 5.90 km².
