= SC Vianense =

Portuguese football club

Vianense
- Full name: Sport Clube Vianense
- Founded: 1898
- Ground: Estádio Dr. José de Matos; Viana do Castelo
- Capacity: 3,000
- Owner: Gary Raulino
- Head Coach: Filipe Mesquita
- League: Liga 3
- 2022–23: Campeonato de Portugal Serie A, 2nd Place (Group stage); Serie 1, 1st Place (Promotion play-offs); Championship final, Lost (Third stage)
Home colours	Away colours

Sport Clube Vianense, commonly known as Vianense, is a Portuguese football club based in Viana do Castelo in the district of Viana do Castelo. SC Vianense currently plays in the Liga 3. The club was founded in 1898 and is one of the oldest clubs in Portugal. They play their home matches at the Estádio do Dr. José de Matos in Viana do Castelo. The stadium has a capacity of 3,000 spectators.

The club is affiliated with Associação de Futebol de Viana do Castelo and has competed in the Viana do Castelo championship. The club has also entered the national cup competition known as Taça de Portugal on many occasions. It reached the semifinals of its forerunner, the Campeonato de Portugal in 1924, its third edition.

The football team is run by their SAD, which was purchased in 2022 by Gary Raulino, owner of Canadian team Scrosoppi FC of League1 Ontario, who owns 80% of the SAD, with the club retaining the remaining 20%.

== Season to season ==
Season	Level	Division	Section	Place	Movements
1990–91	Tier 4	Terceira Divisão	Série A	4th	
1991–92	Tier 4	Terceira Divisão	Série A	1st	Promoted
1992–93	Tier 3	Segunda Divisão	Série Norte	17th	Relegated
1993–94	Tier 4	Terceira Divisão	Série A	2nd	Promoted
1994–95	Tier 3	Segunda Divisão	Série Norte	9th	
1995–96	Tier 3	Segunda Divisão	Série Norte	9th	
1996–97	Tier 3	Segunda Divisão	Série Norte	12th	
1997–98	Tier 3	Segunda Divisão	Série Norte	14th	Relegated
1998–99	Tier 4	Terceira Divisão	Série A	1st	Promoted
1999–2000	Tier 3	Segunda Divisão	Série Norte	18th	Relegated
2000–01	Tier 4	Terceira Divisão	Série A	8th	
2001–02	Tier 4	Terceira Divisão	Série A	1st	Promoted
2002–03	Tier 3	Segunda Divisão	Série Norte	20th	Relegated
2003–04	Tier 4	Terceira Divisão	Série A	6th	
2004–05	Tier 4	Terceira Divisão	Série A	9th	
2005–06	Tier 4	Terceira Divisão	Série A	12th	
2006–07	Tier 4	Terceira Divisão	Série A	9th	
2007–08	Tier 4	Terceira Divisão	Série A – 1ª Fase	3rd	Promotion Group
	Tier 4	Terceira Divisão	Série A Fase Final	2nd	Promoted
2008–09	Tier 3	Segunda Divisão	Série A – 1ª Fase	9th	Relegation Group
	Tier 3	Segunda Divisão	Série A Últimos	2nd	
2009–10	Tier 3	Segunda Divisão	Série Norte	13th	Relegated
2010–11	Tier 4	Terceira Divisão	Série A – 1ª Fase	4th	Promotion Group
	Tier 4	Terceira Divisão	Série A Fase Final	3rd	
2011–12	Tier 4	Terceira Divisão	Série A – 1ª Fase	3rd	Promotion Group
	Tier 4	Terceira Divisão	Série A Fase Final	5th	

== League and cup history ==
Season	I	II	III	IV	V	Pts.	Pl.	W	T	L	GS	GA	Diff.
1960–61		12				23 pts	26	10	3	13	36	38	−2
1961–62		4				29 pts	26	13	3	10	28	31	−3
1962–63		12				20 pts	26	7	6	13	36	55	−19
1963–64		13				20 pts	26	8	4	14	37	59	−22
1964–65			2			15 pts	10	7	1	2	22	13	+8
1965–66			2			10 pts	10	2	6	2	11	10	+1
1966–67			3			11 pts	10	4	3	3	12	10	+2
1967–68			3			11 pts	10	5	1	4	14	12	+2
1968–69			2			29 pts	22	12	5	5	41	13	+28
1969–70			8			33 pts	30	13	7	10	46	31	+15
1990–91				4									
1991–92				1									
1992–93			17										
1993–94				2									
1994–95			9										
1995–96			9			49 pts	34	15	4	15	46	41	+5
1996–97			12										
1997–98			14			42 pts	34	12	6	17	38	47	−9
1998–99				1		73 pts	34	22	7	5	82	35	+47
1999–2000			18			32 pts	34	7	11	16	26	43	−17
2000–01				8									
2001–02				1									
2002–03			12										
2003–04				6		53 pts	34	15	8	11	49	43	+6
2004–05				10		46 pts	34	12	10	12	40	37	+3
2005–06				12		38 pts	34	10	8	16	33	49	−16
2006–07				9		42 pts	30	11	9	10	37	34	+3
2007–08				3		44 pts	26	13	5	8	46	23	+23
2008–09			9 [2]			21 pts	22	4	9	9	21	34	−13
2009–10			13			...	...	...	...	...	...	...	...
2010–11				4 [3]									
2011–12				3 [5]									

The second ranking on the recent seasons represents rankings from the playoffs/final phase competitions.

== Honours ==
- Terceira Divisão
  - Champions (1): 1998–99 (Série A)
- Campeonato de Viana do Castelo
  - Champions (17): 1923–24, 1924–25, 1925–26, 1926–27, 1927–28, 1928–29, 1929–30, 1930–31, 1931–32, 1932–33, 1933–34, 1934–35, 1935–36, 1936–37, 1939–40, 1940–41, 1941–42

== Current squad ==
As of 20 September 2026

Note: Flags indicate national team as defined under FIFA eligibility rules; some limited exceptions apply. Players may hold more than one non-FIFA nationality.

No.	Pos.	Nation	Player
1	GK	POR	Gonçalo Lopes
3	DF	BRA	Laércio
7	FW	POR	Moisés Conceição
8	MF	POR	Bruno Silva
9	FW	POR	Pedro Soares
10	MF	POR	Reko
11	FW	POR	Rashid
12	DF	POR	João Faria
13	GK	POR	Nuno Silva
14	MF	MLI	Hamed Doukouré
16	GK	POR	Vítor São Bento
17	FW	MAR	Khalid Hachadi
19	DF	POR	Gabi Faria
20	DF	POR	Joaquim Marques

No.	Pos.	Nation	Player
21	DF	CPV	Henrique Brito
22	MF	POR	Alex Rolo
23	FW	FRA	Lowen Nsonga
30	FW	SLE	Alieson Kamara
46	DF	BRA	Yuri
48	MF	GBS	Dionísio
68	MF	POR	Diogo Maga
70	MF	POR	João Castro
80	MF	POR	Rodrigo Melro (on loan from Gil Vicente)
88	DF	POR	Edu
90	FW	MLI	Sekou Diancoumba
—	DF	POR	Tiago Lima
—	MF	POR	João Carvalho

== Notable former managers ==
- (Portugal) Rogério Gonçalves

== See also ==
- Scrosoppi FC
- Official website (in Portuguese)
