= Nuno Silva (footballer, born 1997) =

Portuguese footballer

Personal information
- Full name: Nuno Miguel Gomes Silva
- Date of birth: 3 August 1997 (age 29)
- Place of birth: Braga, Portugal
- Height: 1.86 m (6 ft 1 in)
- Position: Goalkeeper

Team information
- Current team: Vianense
- Number: 13

Youth career
- 2007–2009: Maximinense
- 2009–2012: Braga
- 2012–2013: FC Ferreirense
- 2013–2014: Braga
- 2014–2015: Vilaverdense
- 2016–2016: Gil Vicente

Senior career*
Years	Team	Apps	(Gls)
2016–2018	Trofense	16	(0)
2018–2019	Gafanha	18	(0)
2019	Mafra	3	(0)
2019–2020	Onisilos Sotira	11	(0)
2020–2021	Praiense		
2021–2023	Oliveirense	13	(0)
2023–2026	Trofense	73	(0)
2026–	Vianense	5	(0)
- * Club domestic league appearances and goals as of 12 September 2026

Nuno Miguel Gomes Silva (born 3 August 1997) is a Portuguese professional footballer who plays for Liga 3 club Vianense as a goalkeeper.

== Club career ==
He made his LigaPro debut for Mafra on 16 March 2019 in a game against Académico Viseu.
