= Brito S.C. =

Portuguese sports club

- Full name: Brito Sport Clube
- Founded: 7 July 1956; 70 years ago
- Ground: Parque de Jogos do Brito SC, Brito
- Capacity: 700
- League: Campeonato de Portugal
- 2021–22: Portuguese District Championships (promoted)

Brito Sport Clube is a Portuguese sports club from Brito, Guimarães.

The men's football team plays in the Campeonato de Portugal. Earlier they also had a stint in the Terceira Divisão from 2005 to 2008.
