= F.C. Ferreiras =

Portuguese football club

FC Ferreiras
- Full name: Futebol Club Ferreiras
- Founded: 1983
- Ground: Estádio da Nora, Ferreiras; Albufeira; Portugal
- Capacity: 2,000
- Head Coach: Ricardo Moreira
- League: Campeonato Nacional de Seniores
- 2017–18: 1ª Divisão AF Algarve, 1st
Home colours	Away colours

Futebol Club Ferreiras is football team located in the town of Ferreiras, within the municipality of Albufeira, Algarve, Portugal. They participate in Serie 'H' of the Campeonato Nacional de Seniores (Seniors National Championship) which is the third league of football in Portugal.

== History ==
The football club was formed on 1 December 1983 and for the first 29 years the first team played in the regional league in the Algarve. In the 2013–14 season, the club was promoted to the Seniors National Championship. This was the first time the club had spent a season at a national level in its history.

== Stadium ==
The club plays all its home matches at the Estádio da Nora which in the town of Ferreiras. The stadium has a capacity of 2,000.

== Current squad ==
Note: Flags indicate national team as defined under FIFA eligibility rules; some limited exceptions apply. Players may hold more than one non-FIFA nationality.

No.	Pos.	Nation	Player
—	GK	POR	Nélio
—	GK	POR	Joao Correia
—	DF	GNB	Mamadu Balde
—	DF	POR	Joao Bonifacio
—	DF	GNB	Sekou Cámara
—	DF	POR	Luís Cavaco
—	DF	POR	David Monteiro
—	DF	POR	André Filipe Ramires Piçarra
—	DF	GNB	Nico Djaló
—	DF	POR	Ricardo José Rodrigues Mestre
—	DF	POR	Diogo Gonçalo Santos Afonso
—	DF	POR	Pedro Colaço

No.	Pos.	Nation	Player
—	MF	POR	Rodrigo Simoes
—	MF	POR	Filipe Alexandre Bessa Barros
—	MF	POR	Flávio Pereira
—	MF	POR	Flávio Manuel
—	MF	POR	André Filipe Silva Rocha Vieira
—	MF	POR	Filipe Soares Caveleira
—	FW	POR	Ricardo Pires
—	FW	POR	Luís Viegas
—	FW	POR	Micael Jacinto Duarte
—	FW	POR	Luis Filipe Jacinto Lamy
—	FW	POR	Joao Antonio Moita Romero

== Gallery ==
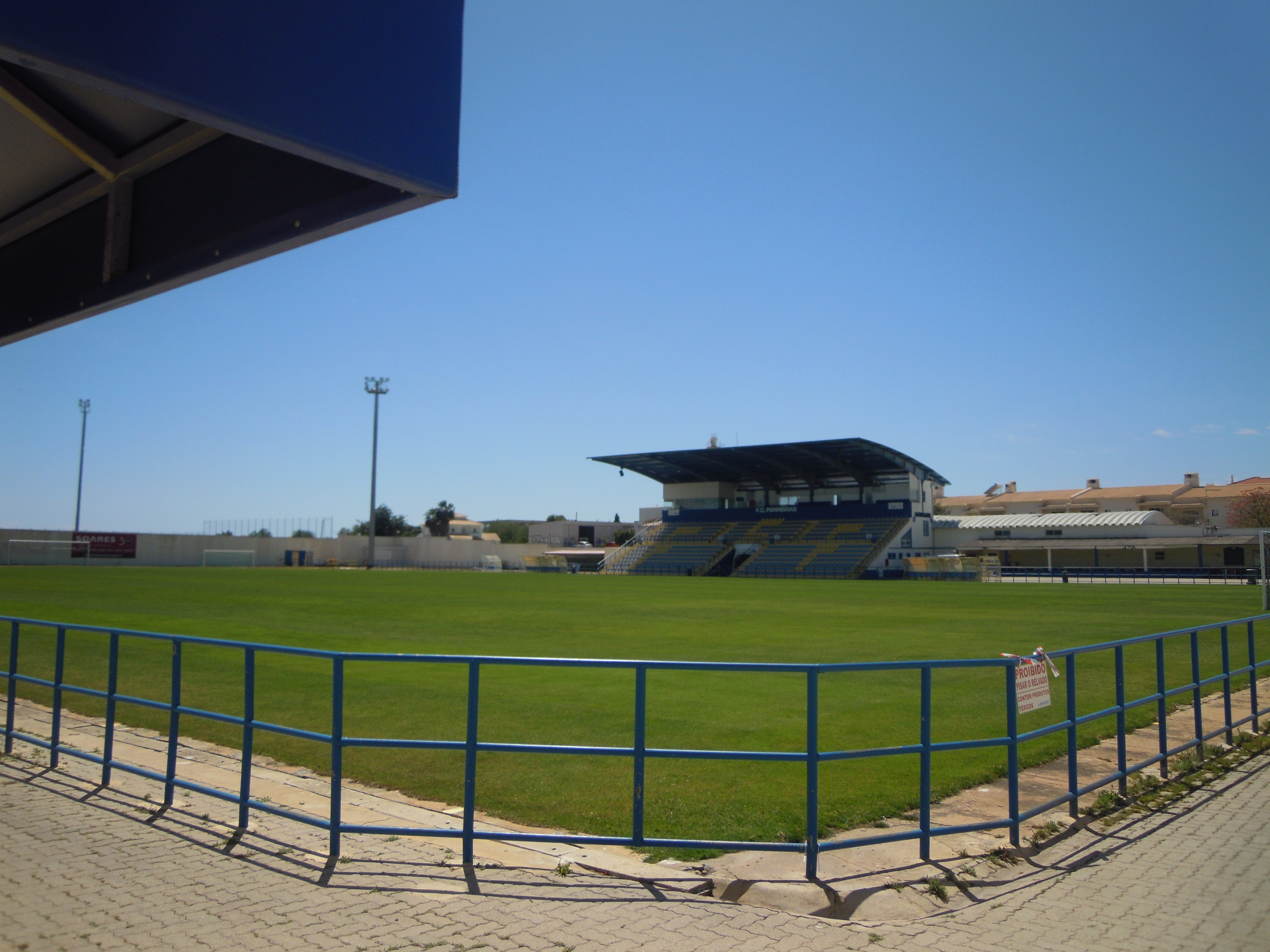
The Estádio da Nora is the home ground of Futebol Club Ferreiras.

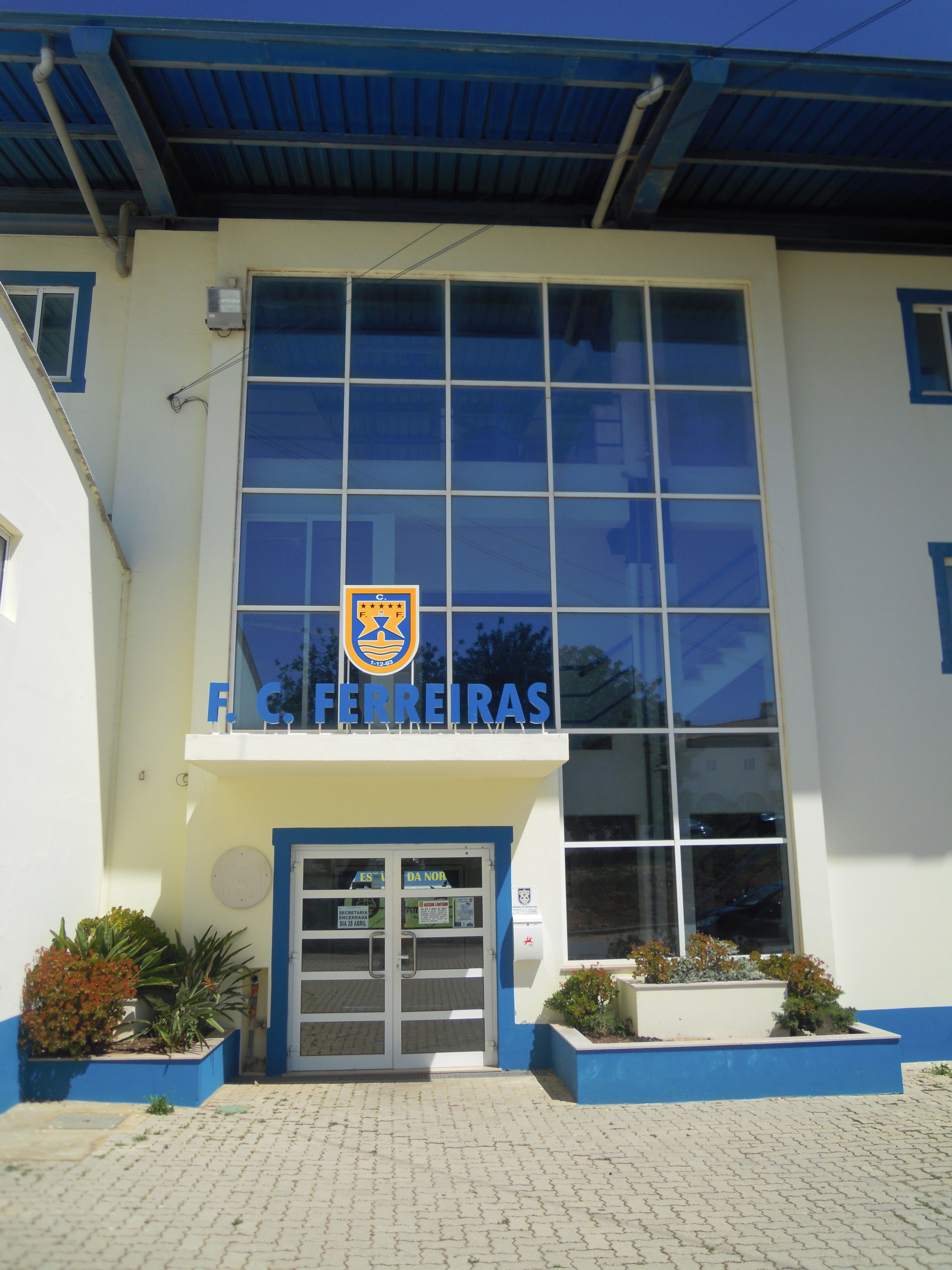
The main entrance to the football ground.

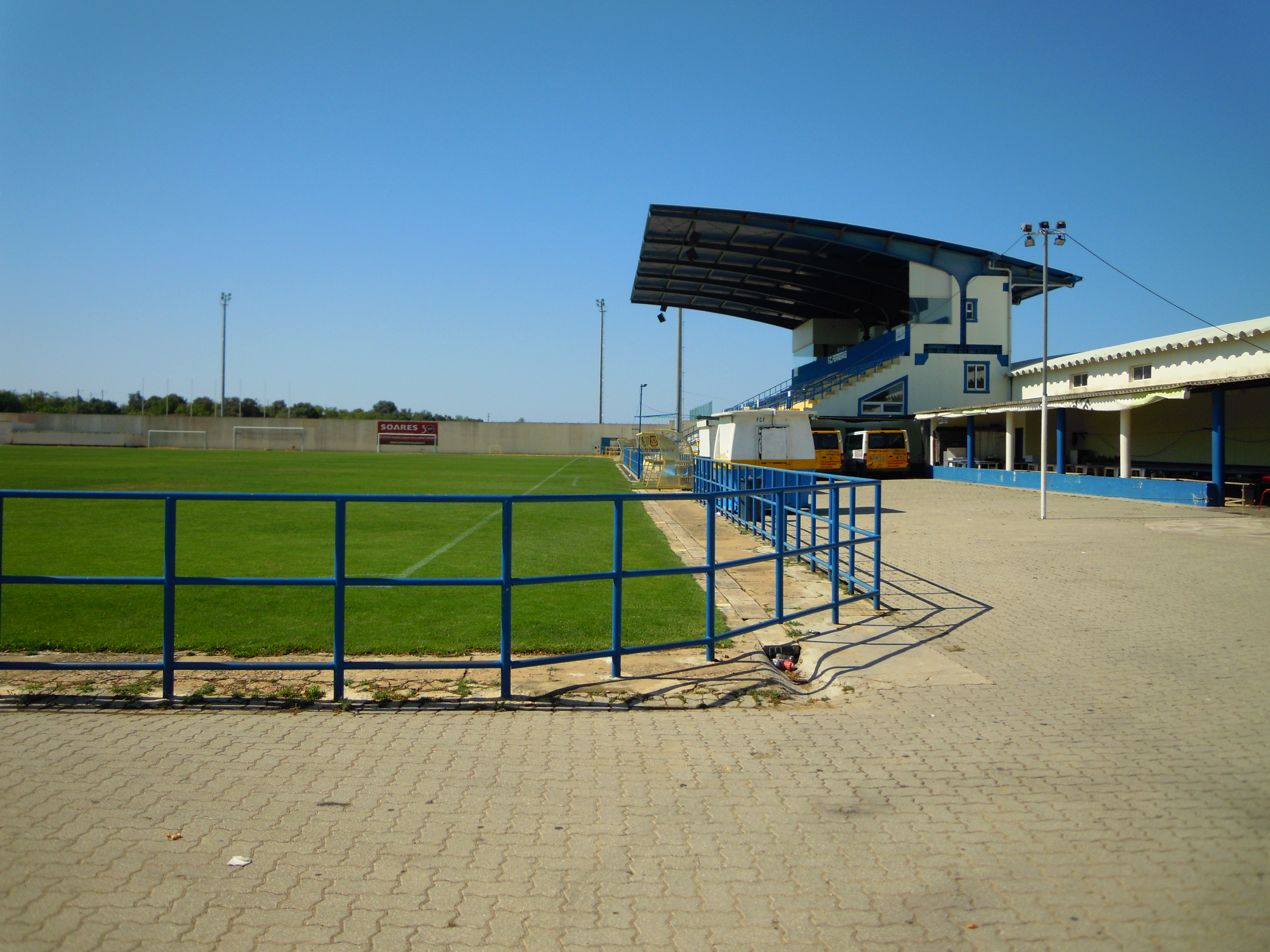
The main stand

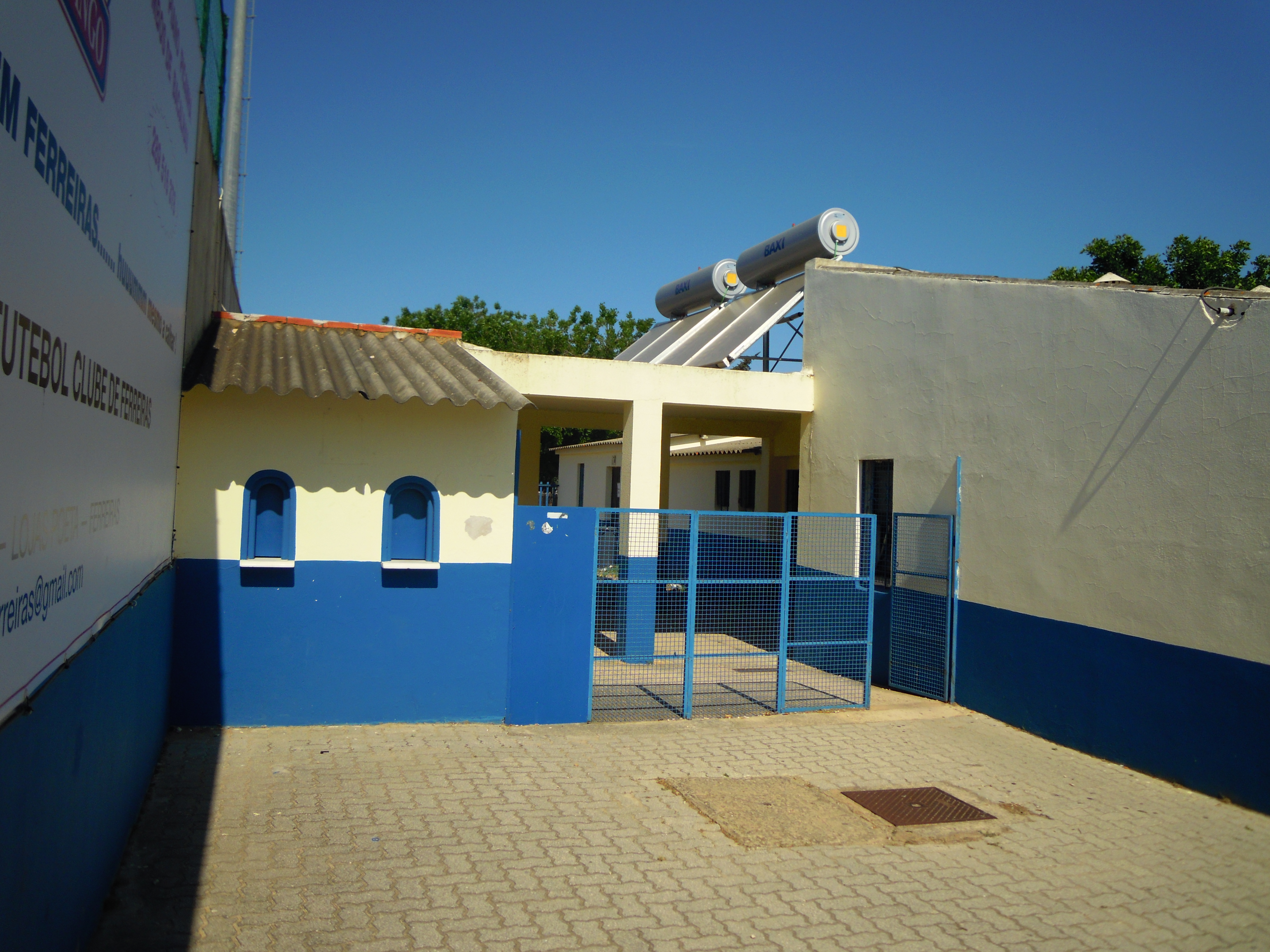
Turnstiles

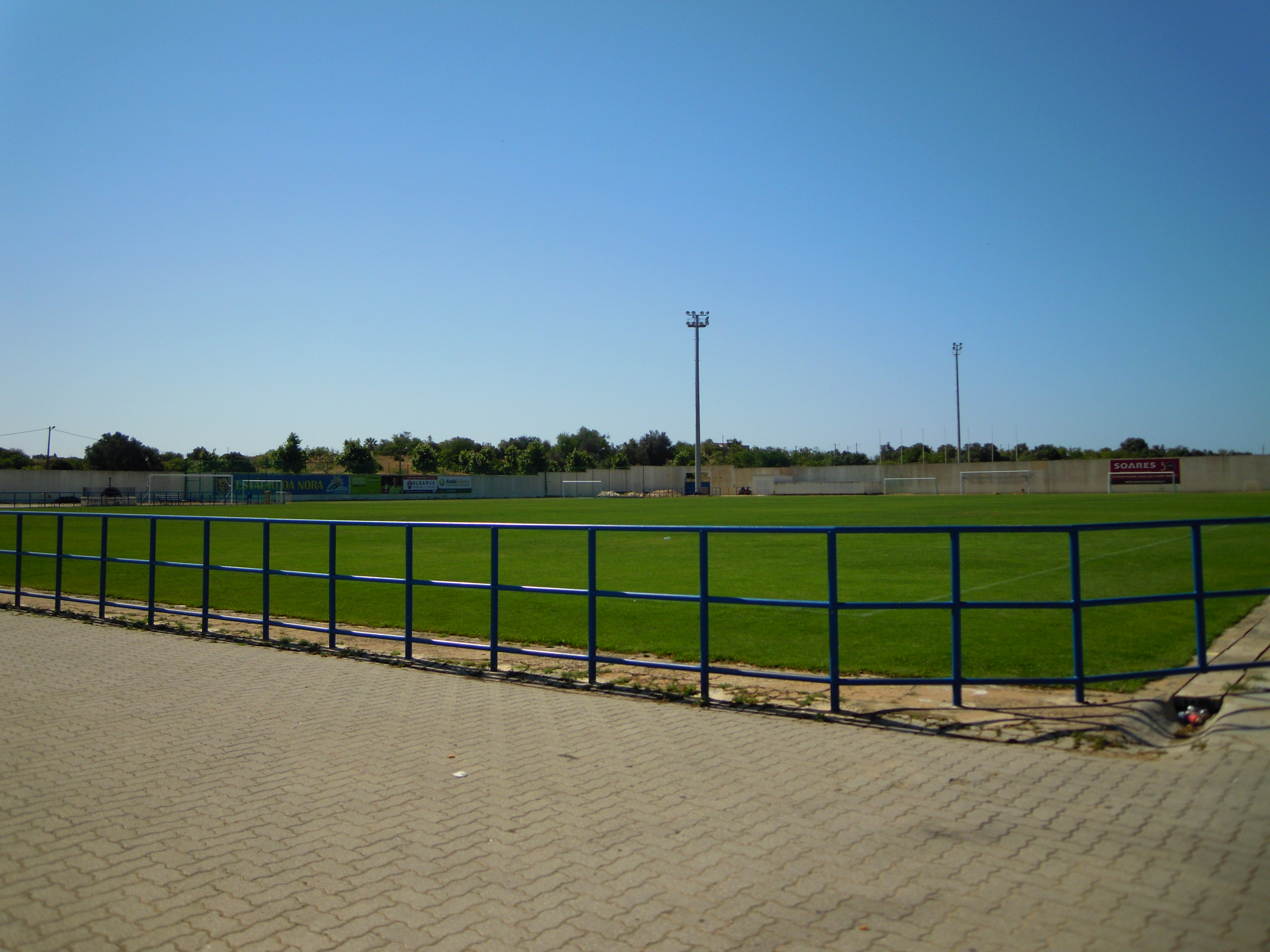
The Pitch

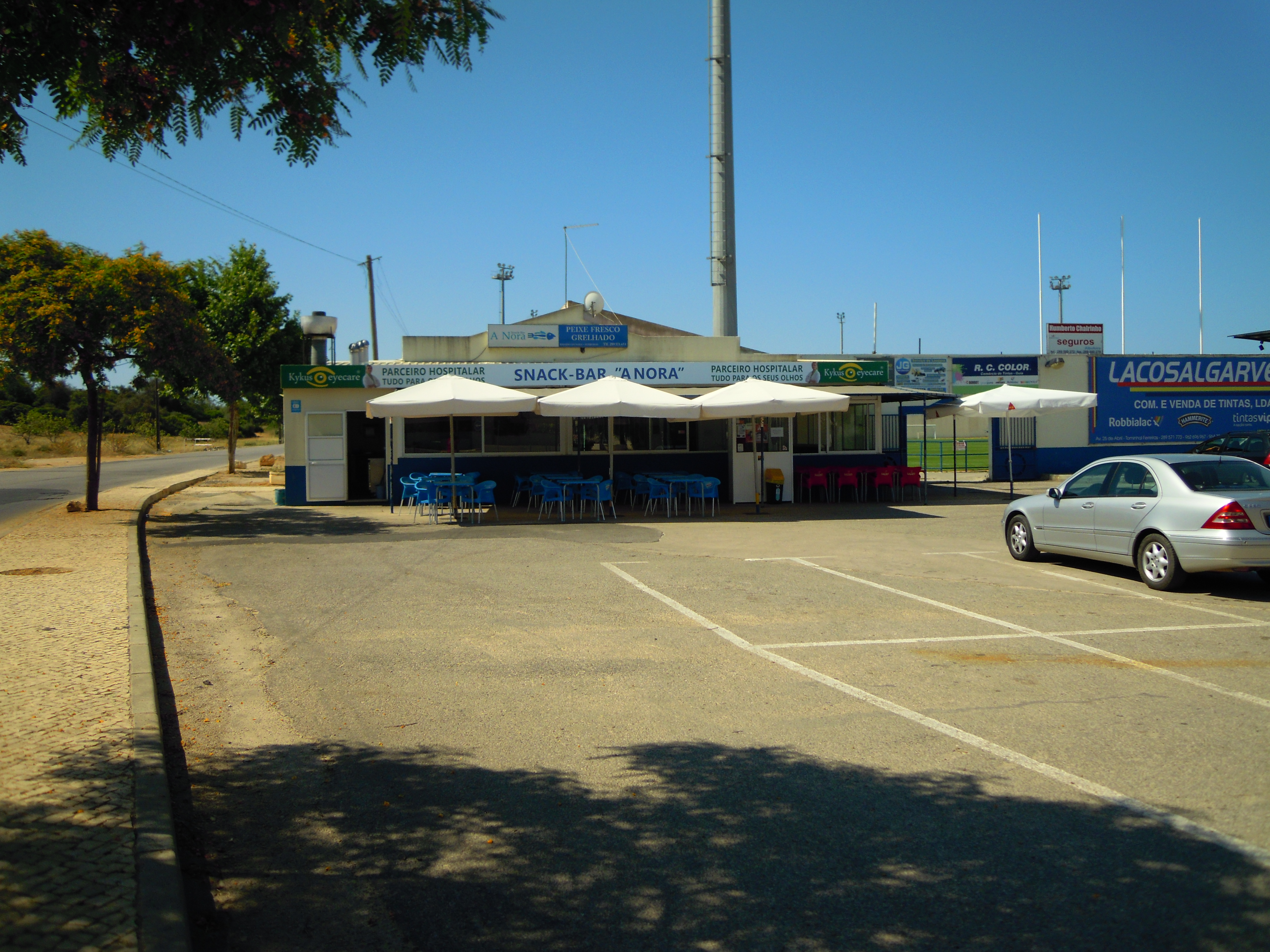
Sporting Club House and Bar

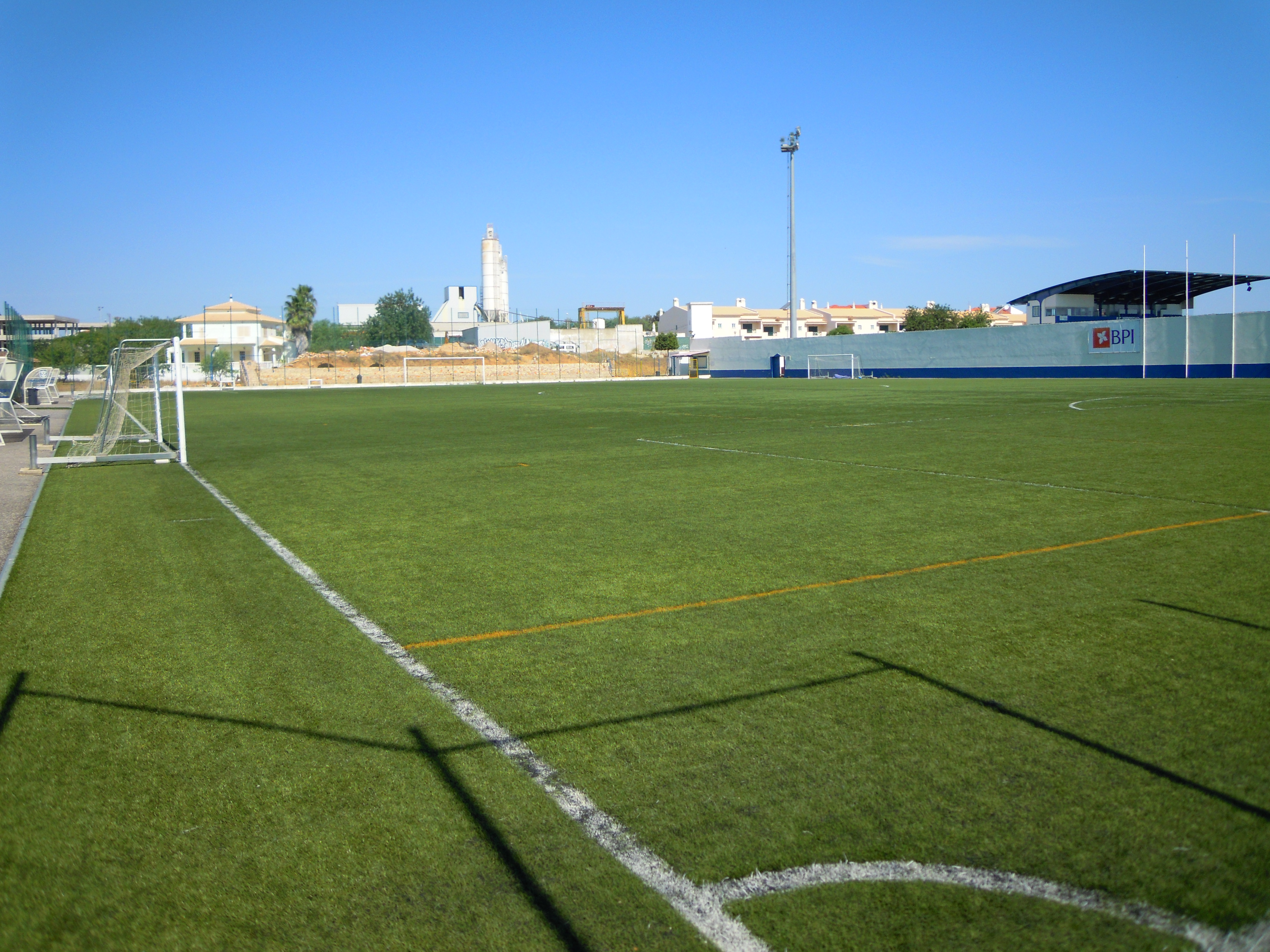
The Training pitch
