= C.A. Pero Pinheiro =

Portuguese sports club

- Full name: Clube Atlético Pero Pinheiro
- Founded: October 7, 1945; 81 years ago
- Ground: Parque de Jogos Pardal Monteiro, Sintra
- Capacity: 3,000
- Chairman: Cristóvão Meireles
- Manager: Rúben Gouveia
- League: Liga 3
- 2022–23: Campeonato de Portugal; 2nd of 14, Group stage of Serie C 3rd of 4, Promotion Play-off Serie 2 (promoted)

Clube Atlético Pero Pinheiro is a Portuguese sports club from Pero Pinheiro, Sintra. The men's football team plays in the Liga 3, the third tier of Portuguese football.

== History ==
Pero Pinheiro also had a stint on the former fourth tier, competing in the 2011–12 and 2012–13 Terceira Divisão. Later, the team won promotion to the 2017–18 Campeonato de Portugal after winning the AF Lisboa Pró-Nacional in 2016–17. The Campeonato de Portugal was the third tier until 2021, when it dropped to being the fourth tier.

On 13 July 2023, Pero Pinheiro promoted to Liga 3 for the first time in history from 2023 to 2024 after finishing third place of promotion play-offs serie 2 due to B-SAD/Cova de Piedade relegation to Distrital championship fail obtaining a license by FPF.

== League and cup history ==
Season	Div.	Pos.	Pl.	W	D	L	GS	GA	P	Cup	League Cup	Notes
2022–23	Campeonato de Portugal	2nd (Group stage of Serie C); 3rd (Promotion play-offs of Serie 2)	30	15	9	6	39	31	54	Fourth round	Ineligible	Promoted to Liga 3 due to Cova de Piedade fail obtain a licence by FPF
2023–24	Liga 3										Ineligible	
