= GD Resende =

Portuguese football club

- Full name: Grupo Desportivo Resende
- Founded: 13 May 1929; 97 years ago
- Ground: Estádio Municipal de Fornelos; Resende
- Capacity: 960
- Manager: Paulo Amor
- League: Campeonato de Portugal
- 2021–22: Divisão de Honra, 2nd
- Website: https://gdresende.wixsite.com/oficial

Grupo Desportivo Resende is a Portuguese football club located in Resende, Portugal. Resende was founded on 13 May 1929.

== Colours and badge ==
Resende's colours are blue and white.
