= A.D. Castro Daire =

Association football club in Portugal

Castro Daire
- Full name: Associação Desportiva Castro Daire
- Nickname: Castrenses
- Founded: 18 October 1975; 50 years ago
- Ground: Complexo Desportivo de Castro Daire, Castro Daire
- Capacity: 2,000
- Chairman: Eduardo Bebiano
- Manager: Vasco Almeida
- League: AF Viseu - Divisão de Honra
- 2022-23: 12° - Group B(Relegated)
- Website: Official website
Home colours	Away colours

Associação Desportiva Castro Daire, commonly known as Castro Daire, is a Portuguese sports club from Castro Daire, Viseu. The club was founded on 18 October 1975. It currently plays at the Estádio Municipal de Castro Daire, which also hosts youth teams of O Crasto.

== Current Squad ==
Note: Flags indicate national team as defined under FIFA eligibility rules; some limited exceptions apply. Players may hold more than one non-FIFA nationality.

No.	Pos.	Nation	Player
3	DF	POR	Pica
4	DF	POR	Rodrigo Teixeira
5	DF	POR	Leandro Gomes
6	MF	CPV	Fred Lopes
7	FW	POR	Marcel Ribeiro
8	MF	POR	Simão Marques
9	FW	POR	Luís Paiva
10	MF	POR	Pedro Marado
11	FW	POR	Gustavo Carvalho
13	FW	POR	Fernando Matias
16	GK	POR	Henrique Silva

No.	Pos.	Nation	Player
17	DF	BRA	Lucas Alvarenga
18	DF	POR	Daniel Oliveira
19	MF	BRA	Denner
26	MF	POR	Guilherme Andrade
49	MF	POR	Matias
66	DF	POR	Henrique Cardoso
69	MF	POR	Tiago Almeida
70	FW	POR	Afonso Correia
75	FW	POR	Nuno Binaia
79	GK	POR	Tomás Correia

== Honours ==
- AF Viseu Divisão de Honra

- 2018-19

- AF Viseu 1°Divisão - Nível II

- 2001-02, 2010-11

- AF Viseu Taça Sócios de Mérito

- 2012-13

- AF Viseu 2°Divisão - Nível III

- 2008-09

- AF Viseu Supertaça

- 2019
