= Sport Arronches e Benfica =

Association football club in Portugal

Arronches e Benfica
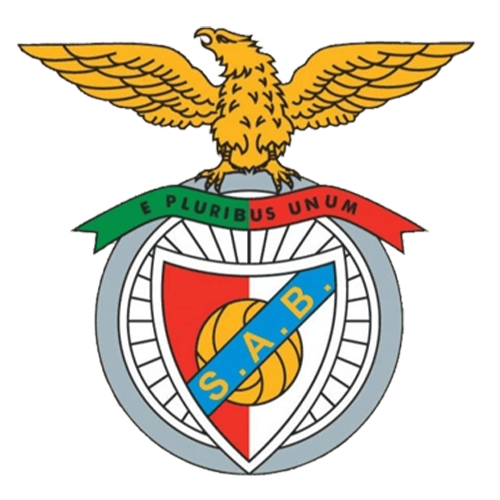
- Full name: Sport Arronches e Benfica
- Nickname: Maravilha
- Founded: 1 April 1939; 86 years ago
- Ground: Estádio Municipal Francisco Palmeiro, Arronches
- Capacity: 3,000
- Chairman: José Júlio Feiteira
- Manager: João Trindrade
- League: AF Portalegre - 1°Divisão
- 2022-23: 12° of 14° - Group C(Relegated)
- Website: http://www.arronchesebenfica.pt/
Home colours	Away colours

Sport Arronches e Benfica, commonly known as Arronches e Benfica, is a Portuguese sports club from Arronches, Portalegre District, and an affiliated club of Benfica. The club was founded on 1 April 1939. It currently plays at the Estádio Municipal Francisco Palmeiro, which also hosts youth teams and the AC Arronches.

== Current Squad ==
Note: Flags indicate national team as defined under FIFA eligibility rules; some limited exceptions apply. Players may hold more than one non-FIFA nationality.

No.	Pos.	Nation	Player
2	MF	POR	Oleg Deliana
4	DF	BRA	Allan Santos
5	DF	UGA	Alex Kakuba
7	FW	POR	Admilson Graça
8	DF	POR	Rafael Gaita
9	FW	POR	João Carlos Lopes
10	FW	ESP	Jorge Perera
11	MF	POR	Pedro Marado
12	GK	BRA	Brendon Santos
13	FW	GNB	M'Buli Nhaga
14	MF	GNB	Jorgito Jumpe

No.	Pos.	Nation	Player
15	DF	CMR	Franck Mouteng
16	MF	GAB	Franck Meye
16	FW	GHA	Sheriff Mohammed
18	DF	POR	Rodrigo Sanhudo
19	DF	POR	Rafael Andrade
21	MF	POR	Gonçalo Compadrinho
22	DF	BRA	Paulo Oliveira
24	GK	POR	Martim Remédios
25	FW	POR	Bernardo Coelho
30	FW	BRA	Bernardo Cunali
45	MF	POR	Bernardo Carapinha

== Honours ==
- AF Portalegre - 1°Divisão

- 2021-22

- AF Portalegre Taça de Honra

- 2023-24 e 2021-22

- AF Portalegre Supertaça

- 2021-22
