= 2025–26 S.C.U. Torreense season =

S.C.U. Torreense
2025–26 season
- Manager: Vítor Martins (until 1 January); Luís Tralhão (from 1 January)
- Stadium: Estádio Manuel Marques
- Liga Portugal 2: 3rd
- Promotion play-offs: Runners-up
- Taça de Portugal: Winners
- Top goalscorer: League: Musa Drammeh (8); All: Musa Drammeh (8)

The 2025–26 season was the 109th season in the history of Sport Clube União Torreense and the fourth consecutive season in Liga Portugal 2. Torreense won their first Taça de Portugal title ever, defeating Sporting CP 2–1 in the final.

== Transfers ==
=== In ===
| Pos. | Player | Transferred to | Fee | Date | Source |
|---|---|---|---|---|---|
| MF | (Spain) Álex Alfaro | (Spain) Deportivo Fabril | | 1 July 2025 | |
| MF | (Spain) Arnau Casas | (Netherlands) SC Cambuur | | 1 July 2025 | |
| MF | (Portugal) Costinha | (Portugal) Tondela | | 1 July 2025 | |
| GK | (Spain) Unai Pérez | (Spain) Barakaldo CF | | 1 July 2025 | |
| FW | (Spain) Javirro | (Spain) Cádiz B | | 31 July 2025 | |
| FW | (France) Ismaïl Seydi | (Austria) Rapid Wien | Loan | 2 August 2025 | |
| FW | (Mali) Kévin Zohi | (France) Stade Lavallois | | 2 August 2025 | |
| DF | (Mauritania) Mohamed Ali Diadié | (France) Reims | | 1 September 2025 | |
| FW | (The Gambia) Musa Drammeh | (Scotland) Heart of Midlothian | | 1 September 2025 | |
| MF | (Brazil) Guilherme Liberato | (Portugal) Moreirense | Loan | 1 September 2025 | |
| MF | (Colombia) Luis Quintero | (Spain) Villarreal CF B | | 20 January 2026 | |

=== Out ===
| Pos. | Player | Transferred to | Fee | Date | Source |
|---|---|---|---|---|---|
| FW | (Comoros) Aboubacar Ali Abdallah | (France) RC Strasbourg | Loan return | 30 June 2025 | |
| DF | (Portugal) Vasco Oliveira | (Portugal) União de Leiria | Loan return | 30 June 2025 | |
| FW | (Brazil) Talles Wander | (Portugal) AVS | Loan return | 30 June 2025 | |
| MF | (Colombia) Juan Balanta | FC Ararat-Armenia | | 1 July 2025 | |
| DF | (Brazil) Dani Bolt | (Azerbaijan) Qarabağ | | 1 July 2025 | |
| MF | (France) Né Lopes | (Belgium) SL16 FC | | 1 July 2025 | |
| DF | (France) Julien Lomboto | (Portugal) Rio Ave | | 1 July 2025 | |
| DF | (Portugal) Né Lopes | (Romania) Oțelul Galați | | 3 July 2025 | |
| MF | (Portugal) Rúben Pinto | (Portugal) Mafra | | 4 July 2025 | |
| GK | (Brazil) Thiago | (Brazil) Joinville | | 1 August 2025 | |
| MF | (Ghana) Yaw Moses | (Azerbaijan) İmişli FK | | 6 August 2025 | |
| FW | (Portugal) Mathys Jean-Marie | (Portugal) Felgueiras | | 25 August 2025 | |
| DF | (Ivory Coast) N'Tamon Elie Ahouonon | (France) Reims | | 27 August 2025 | |
| FW | (Spain) Ethyan González | (Qatar) Muaither SC | | 27 August 2025 | |
| GK | (Brazil) Leandro Matheus | | | 1 January 2026 | |
| MF | (Cape Verde) David Costa | (Portugal) Paços de Ferreira | Loan | 27 January 2026 | |
| FW | (Brazil) Arielson | (Saudi Arabia) Damac | | 28 January 2026 | |
| FW | (Spain) Javirro | (Spain) Bergantiños FC | Loan | 2 February 2026 | |

== Pre-season and friendlies ==
| 19 July 2025 Friendly | Casa Pia | 4–4 | Torreense |

| 26 July 2025 Friendly | Paços de Ferreira | 2–1 | Torreense |

| 26 July 2025 Friendly | Torreense | 1–1 | (Spain) Celta Vigo B |

| 2 August 2025 Toinha Cup | Torreense | 2–1 | (Spain) Mérida |
| | Pozo 16'; Elie 30' | Report | Raúl Beneit 59' |

== Competitions ==
=== Overall record ===
| Competition | First match | Last match | Starting round | Final position | Record | | | | | | | |
| Competition | First match | Last match | Starting round | Final position | Pld | W | D | L | GF | GA | GD | Win % |
|---|---|---|---|---|---|---|---|---|---|---|---|---|
| Liga Portugal 2 | 9 August 2025 | 16 May 2026 | Matchday 1 | 3rd | 34 | 18 | 5 | 11 | 46 | 33 | +13 | 52.94 |
| Promotion play-offs | 20 May 2026 | 28 May 2026 | First leg | Runners-up | 2 | 0 | 1 | 1 | 0 | 2 | −2 | 0.00 |
| Taça de Portugal | 21 September 2025 | 24 May 2026 | Second round | Winners | 8 | 6 | 2 | 0 | 14 | 6 | +8 | 75.00 |
| Total | | | | | 44 | 24 | 8 | 12 | 60 | 41 | +19 | 54.55 |

Source: Competitions

=== Liga Portugal 2 ===
| Pos | Team | Pld | W | D | L | GF | GA | GD | Pts | Promotion, qualification or relegation |
|---|---|---|---|---|---|---|---|---|---|---|
| 1 | Marítimo (C, P) | 34 | 20 | 6 | 8 | 50 | 29 | +21 | 66 | Promotion to the Primeira Liga |
| 2 | Académico de Viseu (P) | 34 | 17 | 8 | 9 | 58 | 33 | +25 | 59 (Note: Head-to-head points: Académico de Viseu 3, Torreense 3; Head-to-head goal difference: Académico de Viseu 0, Torreense 0; Goal difference: Académico de Viseu +25, Torreense +13.) | Promotion to the Primeira Liga |
| 3 | Torreense | 34 | 18 | 5 | 11 | 46 | 33 | +13 | 59 | Qualification for the Promotion play-off and Europa League league phase (Note: Torreense qualified for the Europa League league phase as the 2025–26 Taça de Portugal winners.) |
| 4 | Vizela | 34 | 14 | 9 | 11 | 39 | 40 | −1 | 51 (Note: Head-to-head points: Vizela 3, Porto B 3; Head-to-head goal difference: Vizela +3, Porto B -3.) | |
| 5 | Porto B (Note: Ineligible for promotion) | 34 | 15 | 6 | 13 | 41 | 42 | −1 | 51 | |

Source: Liga Portugal 2
Rules for classification: 1) Points; 2) Head-to-head points; 3) Head-to-head goal difference; 4) Goal difference; 5) Matches won; 6) Goals scored; 7) Play-off.
(C) Champions; (P) Promoted

==== Results summary ====
| Overall | | | | | | | | Home | | | | | | Away | | | | | |
| Pld | W | D | L | GF | GA | GD | Pts | W | D | L | GF | GA | GD | W | D | L | GF | GA | GD |
|---|---|---|---|---|---|---|---|---|---|---|---|---|---|---|---|---|---|---|---|
| 34 | 18 | 5 | 11 | 46 | 33 | +13 | 59 | 10 | 2 | 5 | 25 | 18 | +7 | 8 | 3 | 6 | 21 | 15 | +6 |

==== Results by round ====
| Round | 1 | 2 | 3 | 4 | 5 | 6 | 7 | 8 | 9 | 10 | 11 | 12 | 13 | 14 | 15 | 16 | 17 | 18 | 19 | 20 | 21 | 22 | 23 | 24 | 25 | 26 | 27 | 28 | 29 | 30 | 31 | 32 | 33 | 34 |
|---|---|---|---|---|---|---|---|---|---|---|---|---|---|---|---|---|---|---|---|---|---|---|---|---|---|---|---|---|---|---|---|---|---|---|
| Ground | H | A | H | A | H | A | A | H | A | H | A | H | A | H | A | H | A | A | H | A | H | A | H | H | A | H | A | H | A | H | A | H | A | H |
| Result | L | W | W | L | D | D | W | W | W | W | L | L | L | L | L | L | W | W | W | L | W | D | W | L | W | W | W | D | L | W | D | W | W | W |
| Position | 16 | 6 | 3 | 9 | 7 | 8 | 6 | 3 | 2 | 2 | 2 | 4 | 5 | 6 | 7 | 9 | 8 | 6 | 4 | 5 | 4 | 4 | 4 | 6 | 4 | 3 | 3 | 3 | 4 | 4 | 3 | 3 | 3 | 3 |

Source: Worldfootball
A = Away; H = Home; W = Win; D = Draw; L = Loss

==== Matches ====
| 9 August 2025 1 | Torreense | 0–1 | Sporting CP B | Torres Vedras |
| | | | | Stadium: Estádio Manuel Marques |

| 17 August 2025 2 | Farense | 0–3 | Torreense |

| 23 August 2025 3 | Torreense | 2–1 | Académico de Viseu | Torres Vedras |
| | | | | Stadium: Estádio Manuel Marques |

| 29 August 2025 4 | União de Leiria | 1–0 | Torreense |

| 14 September 2025 5 | Torreense | 0–0 | Paços de Ferreira | Torres Vedras |
| | | | | Stadium: Estádio Manuel Marques |

| 27 September 2025 6 | Benfica B | 3–3 | Torreense |

| 5 October 2025 7 | Porto B | 2–3 | Torreense |

| 24 October 2025 8 | Torreense | 3–2 | Oliveirense | Torres Vedras |
| | | | | Stadium: Estádio Manuel Marques |

| 30 October 2025 9 | Portimonense | 0–1 | Torreense |

| 4 November 2025 10 | Torreense | 2–0 | Felgueiras | Torres Vedras |
| | | | | Stadium: Estádio Manuel Marques |

| 9 November 2025 11 | Leixões | 1–0 | Torreense |

| 30 November 2025 12 | Torreense | 0–2 | Chaves | Torres Vedras |
| | | | | Stadium: Estádio Manuel Marques |

| 6 December 2025 13 | Marítimo | 2–0 | Torreense |

| 12 December 2025 14 | Torreense | 2–3 | Feirense | Torres Vedras |
| | | | | Stadium: Estádio Manuel Marques |

| 21 December 2025 15 | Penafiel | 1–0 | Torreense |

| 30 December 2025 16 | Torreense | 0–1 | Lusitânia de Lourosa | Torres Vedras |
| | | | | Stadium: Estádio Manuel Marques |

| 5 January 2026 17 | Vizela | 0–1 | Torreense |

| 19 January 2026 18 | Sporting CP B | 1–2 | Torreense |

| 25 January 2026 19 | Torreense | 2–1 | Farense | Torres Vedras |
| | | | | Stadium: Estádio Manuel Marques |

| 31 January 2026 20 | Académico de Viseu | 1–0 | Torreense |

| 8 February 2026 21 | Torreense | 3–1 | União de Leiria | Torres Vedras |
| | | | | Stadium: Estádio Manuel Marques |

| 15 February 2026 22 | Paços de Ferreira | 0–0 | Torreense |

| 21 February 2026 23 | Torreense | 1–0 | Benfica B | Torres Vedras |
| | | | | Stadium: Estádio Manuel Marques |

| 28 February 2026 24 | Torreense | 0–3 | Porto B | Torres Vedras |
| | | | | Stadium: Estádio Manuel Marques |

| 7 March 2026 25 | Oliveirense | 0–3 | Torreense |

| 16 March 2026 26 | Torreense | 1–0 | Portimonense | Torres Vedras |
| | | | | Stadium: Estádio Manuel Marques |

| 22 March 2026 27 | Felgueiras | 0–3 | Torreense |

| 6 April 2026 28 | Torreense | 1–1 | Leixões | Torres Vedras |
| | | | | Stadium: Estádio Manuel Marques |

| 11 April 2026 29 | Chaves | 2–0 | Torreense |

| 18 April 2026 30 | Torreense | 1–0 | Marítimo | Torres Vedras |
| | | | | Stadium: Estádio Manuel Marques |

| 28 April 2026 31 | Feirense | 0–0 | Torreense |

| 4 May 2026 32 | Torreense | 3–2 | Penafiel | Torres Vedras |
| | | | | Stadium: Estádio Manuel Marques |

| 9 May 2026 33 | Lusitânia de Lourosa | 1–2 | Torreense |

| 16 May 2026 34 | Torreense | 4–0 | Vizela | Torres Vedras |
| | Quintero 40'; Zohi 63'; Costinha 74' (pen.); Drammeh 90+4' | | | Stadium: Estádio Manuel Marques |

==== Promotion play-offs ====
| 20 May 2026 First leg | Torreense | 0–0 | Casa Pia | Torres Vedras |
| | | | | Stadium: Estádio Manuel Marques |

| 28 May 2026 Second leg | Casa Pia | 2–0 | Torreense | Lisbon |
| 20:00 UTC+1 | Larrazabal 38'; Ofori 77' |

=== Taça de Portugal ===
| 21 September 2025 Second round | ADC Correlhã | 1–3 | Torreense |

| 18 October 2025 Third round | Torreense | 1–1 (5–4 p) | Oliveirense |

| 23 November 2025 Fourth round | Lusitânia de Lourosa | 0–1 | Torreense |

| 17 December 2025 Fifth round | Casa Pia | 1–2 | Torreense |

| 11 January 2026 Quarter-finals | Torreense | 3–1 | União de Leiria |

| 4 February 2026 Semi-finals First leg | Fafe | 1–1 | Torreense | Fafe |
| 20:15 WET | Oliveira 43' | Report | Pozo 59' | Stadium: Estádio Municipal de Fafe; Attendance: 3,112; Referee: Miguel Nogueira |

| 23 April 2026 Semi-finals Second leg | Torreense | 2–0 (3–1 agg.) | Fafe | Torres Vedras |
| 20:45 WEST | Bruno 84'; Stopira 90+13' (pen.) | Report | | Stadium: Estádio Manuel Marques; Attendance: 4,084; Referee: Gustavo Correia |

| 24 May 2026 Final | Sporting CP | 1–2 (a.e.t.) | Torreense | Lisbon |
| 17:15 UTC+1 | Inácio (yellow card) 15'; Suárez 54', (yellow card) 120+6'; Araújo (red card) 109' | Report | Zohi 4'; Alfaro (yellow card) 100'; Stopira 113' (pen.), (yellow card) 114'; Pité (yellow card) 119' | Stadium: Estádio Nacional; Attendance: 35,000; Referee: António Nobre |
