= 2026 Taça de Portugal final =

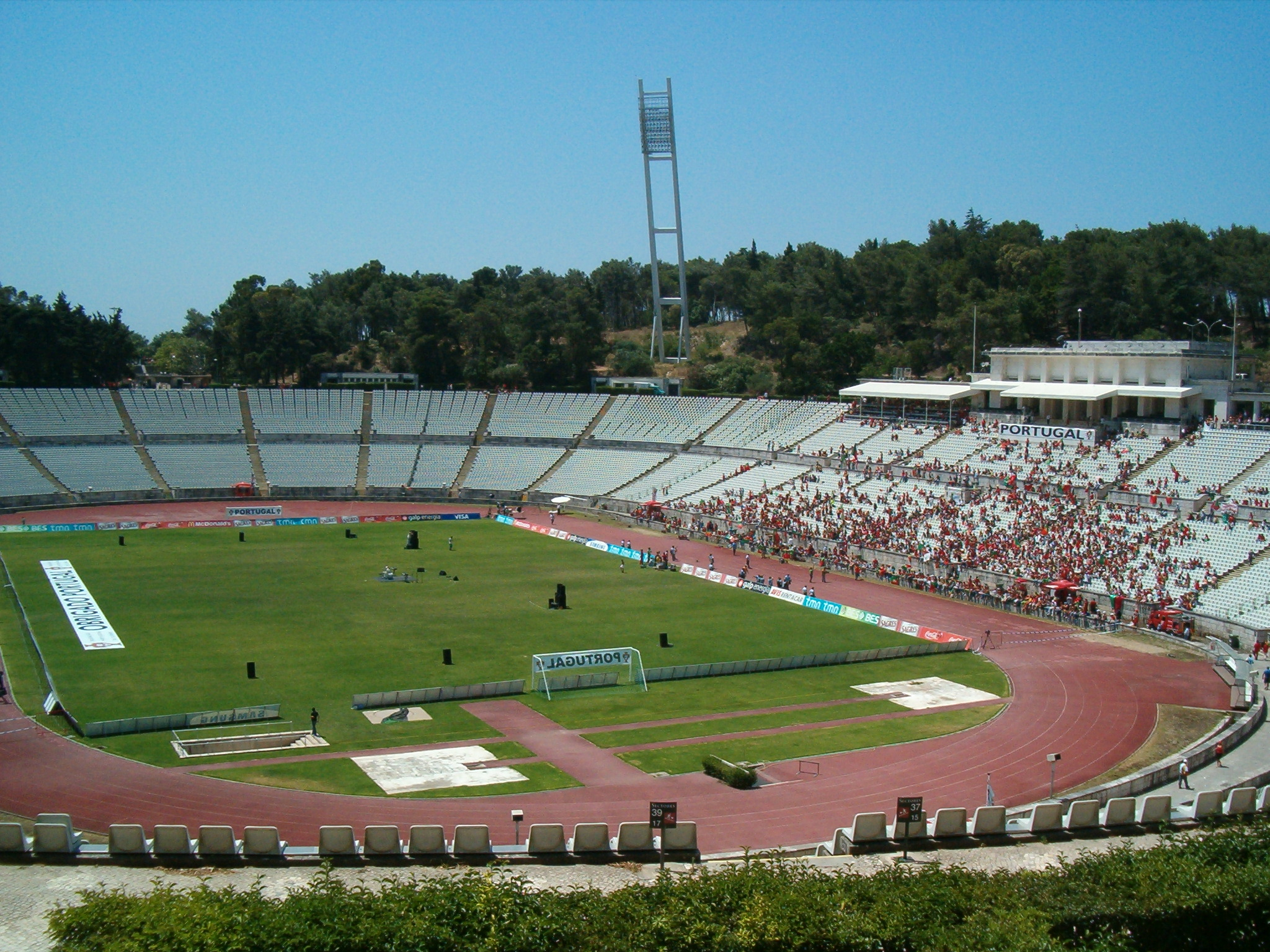
- Estádio Nacional
- Event: 2025–26 Taça de Portugal
Sporting CP	Torreense
1	2
- After extra time
- Date: 24 May 2026
- Venue: Estádio Nacional, Oeiras
- Man of the Match: Stopira
- Fair Player of the Match: Francisco Trincão
- Referee: António Nobre
- Attendance: 35,000

The 2026 Taça de Portugal final was the last match of the 2025–26 Taça de Portugal, which decided the winner of the 86th season of the Taça de Portugal, the premier knockout cup competition in Portuguese football. It was played on 24 May 2026 at the Estádio Nacional in Oeiras.

== Route to the final ==
Sporting CP		Round	Torreense	
Opponent	Result		Opponent	Result
Bye	—	Second round	Correlhã	3–1 (A)
Paços de Ferreira	3–2 (A) (a.e.t.)	Third round	Oliveirense	1–1 (H) (a.e.t.) (5–4 p)
Marinhense	3–0 (H)	Fourth round	Lusitânia de Lourosa	1–0 (A)
Santa Clara	3–2 (A) (a.e.t.)	Fifth round	Casa Pia	2–1 (A)
AVS	3–2 (H) (a.e.t.)	Quarter-finals	União de Leiria	3–1 (H)
Porto	1–0 (H)	Semi-finals	Fafe	1–1 (A)
Porto	0–0 (A)	Semi-finals	Fafe	2–0 (H)
Key: (H) = Home fixture; (A) = Away fixture

== Match ==
=== Summary ===
Torreense took the lead in the 4th minute when Zohi scored following a corner kick, recording the fastest goal in a Taça de Portugal final since 2012. Shortly afterwards, Gonçalo Inácio was booked for a foul on Zohi as the forward advanced toward goal. Sporting CP responded by controlling possession and creating several chances, with Pedro Gonçalves hitting the post in the 33rd minute. Despite Sporting registering 16 shots in the first half, only two were on target, and Torreense held a 1–0 lead at the break.

Sporting equalised in the 54th minute after Maxi Araújo recovered possession high up the pitch and assisted Luis Suárez, who scored with a low right-footed shot. Both teams continued to create opportunities throughout the second half, but neither side managed to score again in normal time, sending the final to extra time. Early in the additional period, Diadié had a goal ruled out for offside for Torreense.

In the second half of extra time, Maxi Araújo fouled Ismaïl Seydi inside the penalty area following a defensive error by Sporting. After a VAR review, the referee awarded a penalty and sent Araújo off. Stopira converted the resulting spot kick to give Torreense a 2–1 lead. Despite Seydi missing an opportunity to make it 3–1 in the fourth minute of added time, Torreense still secured their first Taça de Portugal title.

=== Details ===
24 May 2026
17:15 WEST (UTC+01:00)

Sporting CP	1–2 (a.e.t.)	Torreense
Suárez 54'	Report	Zohi 4'; Stopira 113' (pen.)

Estádio Nacional, Oeiras
Attendance: 35,000
Referee: António Nobre

GK	1	(Portugal) Rui Silva
RB	13	(Greece) Georgios Vagiannidis		(substituted off) 69'
CB	72	(Portugal) Eduardo Quaresma		(substituted off) 100'
CB	25	(Portugal) Gonçalo Inácio	(yellow card) 15'	(substituted off) 114'
LB	20	(Uruguay) Maximiliano Araújo	(red card) 109'
CM	42	(Denmark) Morten Hjulmand (c)
CM	5	(Japan) Hidemasa Morita		(substituted off) 70'
RW	10	(Mozambique) Geny Catamo		(substituted off) 90+2'
AM	17	(Portugal) Francisco Trincão
LW	8	(Portugal) Pedro Gonçalves		(substituted off) 90+2'
CF	97	(Colombia) Luis Suárez	(yellow card) 120+6'
Substitutes:
GK	12	(Portugal) João Virgínia
DF	26	(Ivory Coast) Ousmane Diomande		(substituted on) 69'
DF	91	(Portugal) Ricardo Mangas	(yellow card) 98'
MF	14	(Georgia (country)) Giorgi Kochorashvili
MF	23	(Portugal) Daniel Bragança		(substituted on) 90+2'
FW	7	(Portugal) Geovany Quenda		(substituted on) 90+2'
FW	15	(Senegal) Souleymane Faye		(substituted on) 114'
FW	31	(Brazil) Luis Guilherme		(substituted on) 70'
FW	90	(Portugal) Rafael Nel		(substituted on) 100'
Manager:
(Portugal) Rui Borges

GK	1	(Brazil) Lucas Paes
RB	22	(Portugal) David Bruno
CB	93	(Mauritania) Mohamed Ali Diadié
CB	2	(Cape Verde) Stopira (c)	(yellow card) 114'
LB	23	(Spain) Javi Vázquez		(substituted off) 104'
CM	65	(Brazil) Guilherme Liberato		(substituted off) 81'
CM	6	(Brazil) Léo Azevedo
RW	29	(Colombia) Luis Quintero		(substituted off) 69'
AM	10	(Portugal) Costinha		(substituted off) 91'
LW	7	(Haiti) Dany Jean		(substituted off) 57'
CF	9	(Mali) Kévin Zohi		(substituted off) 57'
Substitutes:
GK	13	(Spain) Unai Pérez
DF	46	(Cameroon) Brian Agbor
DF	57	(Brazil) Danilo		(substituted on) 104'
MF	4	(Spain) Arnau Casas
MF	8	(Spain) Álex Alfaro	(yellow card) 100'	(substituted on) 69'
MF	20	(Portugal) Pité	(yellow card) 119'	(substituted on) 91'
MF	26	(Portugal) André Simões		(substituted on) 81'
FW	17	(Spain) Musa Drammeh		(substituted on) 57'
FW	31	(France) Ismaïl Seydi		(substituted on) 57'
Manager:
(Portugal) Luís Tralhão

Man of the Match:
Stopira (Torreense)
Fair Player of the Match:
Francisco Trincão (Sporting CP)

Assistant referees:
Nelson Pereira
Francisco Pereira
Fourth official:
Helder Malheiro
Video assistant referee:
Pedro Ferreira
Assistant video assistant referees:
Antonio Moreira

Match rules

- 90 minutes
- 30 minutes of extra time if necessary
- Penalty shoot-out if scores still level
- Nine named substitutes
- Maximum of five substitutions, with a sixth allowed in extra time (Note: Each team was given only three opportunities to make substitutions, with a fourth opportunity in extra time, excluding substitutions made at half-time, before the start of extra time and at half-time in extra time.)

=== Statistics ===
First half
Statistic	Sporting CP	Torreense
Goals scored	0	1
Total shots	16	5
Shots on target	2	1
Saves	0	2
Ball possession	67%	33%
Corner kicks	8	2
Fouls committed	5	6
Offsides	3	0
Yellow cards	1	0
Red cards	0	0

Second half
Statistic	Sporting CP	Torreense
Goals scored	1	0
Total shots	8	0
Shots on target	2	0
Saves	0	1
Ball possession	73%	27%
Corner kicks	6	0
Fouls committed	6	6
Offsides	2	0
Yellow cards	0	0
Red cards	0	0

Extra Time
Statistic	Sporting CP	Torreense
Goals scored	0	1
Total shots	9	3
Shots on target	3	1
Saves	0	3
Ball possession	80%	20%
Corner kicks	6	0
Fouls committed	5	5
Offsides	0	1
Yellow cards	2	3
Red cards	1	0

Overall
Statistic	Sporting CP	Torreense
Goals scored	1	2
Total shots	33	8
Shots on target	7	2
Saves	0	6
Ball possession	72%	28%
Corner kicks	20	2
Fouls committed	16	17
Offsides	5	1
Yellow cards	3	3
Red cards	1	0

== See also ==
- 2025–26 Sporting CP season
- 2026 Taça da Liga final
