= 2023–24 S.C.U. Torreense season =

S.C.U. Torreense
2023–24 season
- Manager: Rui Ferreira
- Stadium: Estádio Manuel Marques
- Liga Portugal 2: 4th
- Taça de Portugal: Fourth round
- Taça da Liga: Second round

The 2023–24 season is S.C.U. Torreense's 107th season in existence and second consecutive in the Liga Portugal 2. They are also competing in the Taça de Portugal and Taça da Liga.

== Players ==
=== First-team squad ===
As of 1 October 2023

Note: Flags indicate national team as defined under FIFA eligibility rules; some limited exceptions apply. Players may hold more than one non-FIFA nationality.

No.	Pos.	Nation	Player
1	GK	BRA	Vagner
2	DF	POR	Nuno Campos
3	DF	ESP	Fran González
4	DF	BRA	Guilherme Willian
5	DF	POR	João Afonso
6	MF	CPV	David Tavares (on loan from Famalicão)
8	MF	POR	Benny
9	FW	PAN	Azarias Londoño (on loan from Alianza Panama)
10	FW	BRA	Welthon
11	FW	HAI	Carnejy Antoine
12	GK	POR	Ricardo Fernandes
13	DF	POR	Simãozinho
14	DF	FRA	Marvin Elimbi
17	DF	URU	Cristian Tassano (on loan from Khimki)

No.	Pos.	Nation	Player
19	FW	ESP	Jonny Arriba
20	FW	ARG	Jorge Correa
21	MF	POR	André Rodrigues
24	DF	POR	Rodrigo Borges
27	DF	BEL	Anthony D'Alberto
29	FW	CPV	Patrick Fernandes
30	MF	COL	Juan Balanta
31	DF	POR	Joãozinho
32	MF	COL	Sebastián Guzmán
40	FW	COL	Pipe Gómez
77	MF	COL	Carlos Rentería
80	DF	BRA	Keffel
90	MF	POR	David Costa
99	GK	POR	Carlos Henriques

== Transfers ==
=== In ===
Pos.	Player	Transferred from	Fee	Date	Source
MF	(Portugal) [[ ]]	(Portugal)	Free	July 2023	

=== Out ===
Pos.	Player	Transferred to	Fee	Date	Source
MF	(Portugal) [[ ]]	(Portugal)	Free	July 2023	

== Pre-season and friendlies ==
Win Draw Loss Fixtures

12 July 2023 Friendly	Braga (Portugal)	4–0	(Portugal) Torreense
	A. Horta 19'; Gomes 22'; Banza 59'; R. Horta 90+3'

== Competitions ==
=== Overall record ===
Competition	First match	Last match	Starting round	Final position	Record							
Competition	First match	Last match	Starting round	Final position	Pld	W	D	L	GF	GA	GD	Win %
Liga Portugal 2	16 August 2023	19 May 2024	Matchday 1		12	5	5	2	17	11	+6	41.67
Taça de Portugal	24 September 2023	26 November 2023	Second round	Fourth round	3	2	1	0	4	2	+2	66.67
Taça da Liga	21 July 2023	30 July 2023	First round	Second round	2	1	0	1	1	2	−1	50.00
Total					17	8	6	3	22	15	+7	47.06

Last updated: 2 December 2023
Source: Soccerway

=== Liga Portugal 2 ===
==== League table ====
Pos	Team	Pld	W	D	L	GF	GA	GD	Pts
5	Paços de Ferreira	34	14	10	10	42	35	+7	52
6	Tondela	34	12	13	9	46	43	+3	49
7	Torreense	34	13	9	12	40	37	+3	48
8	Benfica B (Note: Ineligible for promotion)	34	12	9	13	48	48	0	45
9	Mafra	34	11	11	12	37	39	−2	44 (Note: Ranked on head-to-head: Mafra 2–1 Porto B, Porto B 1–1 Mafra)

Source: Liga Portugal 2
Rules for classification: 1) Points; 2) Head-to-head points; 3) Head-to-head goal difference; 4) Head-to-head away goals scored; 5) Goal difference; 6) Matches won; 7) Goals scored; 8) Play-off.

==== Results summary ====
Overall								Home						Away					
Pld	W	D	L	GF	GA	GD	Pts	W	D	L	GF	GA	GD	W	D	L	GF	GA	GD
12	5	5	2	17	11	+6	20	2	3	1	9	5	+4	3	2	1	8	6	+2

Last updated: 2 December 2023.
Source: Superliga

==== Results by round ====
Round	1
Ground	
Result	
Position	

Updated to match(es) played on November 2023. Source: Superliga
A = Away; H = Home; W = Win; D = Draw; L = Loss

==== Matches ====
The league fixtures were unveiled on 5 July 2023.

5 November 2023	Tondela	1–2	Torreense	Tondela
20:00 WET (UTC±0)				Stadium: Estádio João Cardoso

12 November 2023	Torreense	v	Mafra	Torres Vedras
11:00 WET (UTC±0)				Stadium: Estádio Manuel Marques

19 November 2023	Marítimo	1–2	Torreense
17:30 WET (UTC±0)

3 December 2023	Torreense	0–0	Leixões	Torres Vedras
11:00 WET (UTC±0)				Stadium: Estádio Manuel Marques

29 December 2023	Torreense	v	Vilaverdense	Torres Vedras
--:-- WET (UTC±0)				Stadium: Estádio Manuel Marques

=== Taça de Portugal ===
24 September 2023 Second round	Oriental Lisboa	0–1	Torreense	Lisbon
11:00 WEST (UTC+1)				Stadium: Campo Engenheiro Carlos Salema

22 October 2023 Third round	Torreense	2–1	Rio Ave	Torres Vedras
14:00 WEST (UTC+1)				Stadium: Estádio Manuel Marques

26 November 2023 Fourth round	Torreense	1–1 (a.e.t.) (2–4 p)	Tondela	Torres Vedras
17:00 WET (UTC±0)	Guzmán 46'		Roberto 68' (pen.)	Stadium: Estádio Manuel Marques

=== Taça da Liga ===
21 July 2023 First round	Torreense	1–0	Mafra	Torres Vedras
20:15 WEST (UTC+1)	Welthon 90+3'			Stadium: Estádio Manuel Marques

30 July 2023 Second round	Torreense	0–2	Casa Pia	Torres Vedras
20:00 WEST (UTC+1)			Clayton 42'; Cardoso 68'	Stadium: Estádio Manuel Marques
