= 2022–23 S.C.U. Torreense season =

S.C.U. Torreense
2022–23 season
- Chairman: Mário Miranda
- Head coach: Pedro Moreira
- Stadium: Estádio Manuel Marques
- Liga Portugal 2: 16th
- Taça de Portugal: Second round
- Taça da Liga: Group stage
- Top goalscorer: League: João Vieira (2); All: João Vieira (4)
Home colours	Away colours
- All statistics correct as of 7 January 2023.

The 2022–23 season is the 106th season in the history of S.C.U. Torreense and their first season back in the second division of Portuguese football. The club are participating in the Liga Portugal 2, the Taça de Portugal, and the Taça da Liga. The season covers the period from 1 July 2022 to 30 June 2023.

== Players ==
As of 5 September 2022

Note: Flags indicate national team as defined under FIFA eligibility rules; some limited exceptions apply. Players may hold more than one non-FIFA nationality.

No.	Pos.	Nation	Player
1	GK	BRA	Vagner
2	DF	POR	Nuno Campos
3	DF	POR	João Pereira
4	DF	POR	Pedro Machado
5	DF	POR	João Afonso
7	FW	POR	Frédéric Maciel
8	MF	POR	Guilherme Morais
9	FW	ANG	Mateus
10	MF	POR	Midana Sambú
11	MF	BRA	Diego Raposo
12	FW	POR	Alex
14	DF	POR	Simão Rocha
17	FW	POR	João Vieira
18	FW	POR	João Oliveira
19	DF	POR	Rui Silva
20	MF	POR	João Cardoso
21	MF	POR	Reko Silva

No.	Pos.	Nation	Player
22	GK	BRA	Léo
23	MF	POR	Duarte Carvalho
26	GK	POR	Joel Tomé
27	GK	POR	Rafael Pereira
30	MF	COL	Juan Balanta
31	MF	POR	Nuno Pina
34	DF	POR	João Paulo
37	FW	ANG	Picas
49	DF	POR	Manuel Rebelo
50	DF	GBS	Iero Seidi
66	MF	POR	João Lameira
67	FW	POR	Renato Santos
70	DF	BRA	Gustavo Marques
77	MF	COL	Carlos Rentería
80	DF	BRA	Keffel
97	MF	BRA	Cícero
99	GK	POR	Carlos Henriques

== Pre-season and friendlies ==
Win Draw Loss Fixtures

13 July 2022 Friendly	Vitória de Guimarães (Portugal)	1–0	(Portugal) Torreense	Guimarães
08:00 WEST (UTC+1)				Stadium: Estádio D. Afonso Henriques

15 July 2022 Friendly	Vizela (Portugal)	1–3	(Portugal) Torreense	Vizela
10:30 WEST (UTC+1)	João Ricardo 60'		Mateus 15'; Simão Rocha 75'; João Oliveira 80'	Stadium: Estádio do FC Vizela

27 July 2022 Friendly	Torreense (Portugal)	0–1	(Portugal) Casa Pia	TBD
10:00 WEST (UTC+1)			Godwin 79'

== Competitions ==
=== Overall record ===
Competition	First match	Last match	Starting round	Final position	Record							
Competition	First match	Last match	Starting round	Final position	Pld	W	D	L	GF	GA	GD	Win %
Liga Portugal 2	6 August 2022	26 May 2023	Matchday 1	9th	34	13	5	16	38	41	−3	38.24
Taça de Portugal	1 October 2022		Second round	Second round	1	0	0	1	1	3	−2	0.00
Taça da Liga	20 November 2022	6 December 2022	Group stage	Group stage	4	1	3	0	5	4	+1	25.00
Total					39	14	8	17	44	48	−4	35.90

Source: Soccerway

=== Liga Portugal 2 ===
==== League table ====
Pos	Team	Pld	W	D	L	GF	GA	GD	Pts
7	Vilafranquense	34	12	10	12	42	36	+6	46 (Note: Vilafranquense are ahead of Feirense on head-to-head points: Vilafranquense 1–0 Feirense, Feirense 1–2 Vilafranquense.)
8	Feirense	34	11	13	10	43	37	+6	46
9	Torreense	34	13	5	16	38	41	−3	44
10	Oliveirense	34	11	10	13	51	50	+1	43
11	Tondela	34	8	16	10	35	35	0	40

Updated to match(es) played on 28 May 2023. Source: Liga Portugal 2
Rules for classification: 1) Points; 2) Head-to-head points; 3) Head-to-head goal difference; 4) Head-to-head away goals scored; 5) Goal difference; 6) Matches won; 7) Goals scored; 8) Play-off.

==== Results summary ====
Overall								Home						Away					
Pld	W	D	L	GF	GA	GD	Pts	W	D	L	GF	GA	GD	W	D	L	GF	GA	GD
0	0	0	0	0	0	0	0	0	0	0	0	0	0	0	0	0	0	0	0

Last updated: August 2022.
Source: Liga Portugal

==== Results by round ====
Round	1
Ground	
Result	
Position	

Updated to match(es) played on August 2022. Source: Liga Portugal
A = Away; H = Home; W = Win; D = Draw; L = Loss

==== Matches ====
The league fixtures were announced on 5 July 2022.

6 August 2022 1	Farense	2–1	Torreense

13 August 2022 2	Torreense	0–2	Nacional	Torres Vedras
				Stadium: Estádio Manuel Marques

20 August 2022 3	Moreirense	3–0	Torreense

28 August 2022 4	Torreense	0–0	Benfica B	Torres Vedras
				Stadium: Estádio Manuel Marques

3 September 2022 5	Academico Viseu	1–2	Torreense

11 September 2022 6	Torreense	0–3	Tondela	Torres Vedras
				Stadium: Estádio Manuel Marques

17 September 2022 7	Porto B	2–0	Torreense

8 October 2022 8	Torreense	1–0	Estrela	Torres Vedras
				Stadium: Estádio Manuel Marques

18 October 2022 9	Torreense	0–1	B-SAD	Torres Vedras
				Stadium: Estádio Manuel Marques

22 October 2022 10	Sporting Covilhã	0–3	Torreense

29 October 2022 11	Torreense	0–1	Mafra	Torres Vedras
				Stadium: Estádio Manuel Marques

5 November 2022 12	Leixões	1–0	Torreense

11 November 2022 13	Torreense	0–1	Vilafranquense	Torres Vedras
				Stadium: Estádio Manuel Marques

30 December 2022 14	Trofense	0–1	Torreense

7 January 2023 15	Torreense	1–1	Oliveirense	Torres Vedras
				Stadium: Estádio Manuel Marques

14 January 2023 16	Penafiel	0–0	Torreense

23 January 2023 17	Torreense	4–2	Feirense	Torres Vedras
				Stadium: Estádio Manuel Marques

29 January 2023 18	Torreense	1–0	Farense	Torres Vedras
				Stadium: Estádio Manuel Marques

4 February 2023 19	Nacional	3–1	Torreense

10 February 2023 20	Torreense	1–0	Moreirense	Torres Vedras
				Stadium: Estádio Manuel Marques

19 February 2023 21	Benfica B	1–2	Torreense

25 February 2023 22	Torreense	1–2	Academico Viseu	Torres Vedras
				Stadium: Estádio Manuel Marques

4 March 2023 23	Tondela	1–1	Torreense

11 March 2023 24	Torreense	3–0	Porto B	Torres Vedras
				Stadium: Estádio Manuel Marques

18 March 2023 25	Estrela	1–0	Torreense

2 April 2023 26	B-SAD	1–3	Torreense

8 April 2023 27	Torreense	3–1	Sporting Covilhã	Torres Vedras
				Stadium: Estádio Manuel Marques

15 April 2023 28	Mafra	1–0	Torreense	Mafra
15:30	Gui Ferreira 90+5' (pen.)			Stadium: Estádio Municipal de Mafra

22 April 2023 29	Torreense	2–0	Leixões	Torres Vedras
14:00				Stadium: Estádio Manuel Marques

29 April 2023 30	Vilafranquense	2–0	Torreense	Rio Maior
11:00				Stadium: Estádio Municipal de Rio Maior

7 May 2023 31	Torreense	0–0	Trofense	Torres Vedras
11:00				Stadium: Estádio Manuel Marques

15 May 2023 32	Oliveirense	3–1	Torreense	Oliveira de Azeméis
18:00				Stadium: Estádio Carlos Osório

21 May 2023 33	Torreense	5–1	Penafiel	Torres Vedras
15:30				Stadium: Estádio Manuel Marques

26 May 2023 34	Feirense	4–1	Torreense	Santa Maria da Feira
18:00				Stadium: Estádio Marcolino de Castro
