= Tralhão =

Tralhão is a Portuguese surname. Notable people with the surname include:

- Luís Tralhão (born 1978), Portuguese football manager, brother of João
- João Tralhão (born 1980), Portuguese football manager, brother of Luís
