= Ibraima So =

Bissau-Guinean footballer

Personal information
- Full name: Ibraima So
- Date of birth: 30 November 1987 (age 38)
- Place of birth: Bissau, Guinea-Bissau
- Height: 1.78 m (5 ft 10 in)
- Position: Defensive midfielder

Youth career
- 2001–2004: Juventude Atlântico
- 2004–2006: Nacional

Senior career*
Years	Team	Apps	(Gls)
2006–2008	Caniçal	0	(0)
2008–2009	Machico	3	(0)
2009–2010	Morais	22	(0)
2010–2011	Canicense	28	(4)
2011–2012	Naval	0	(0)
2011–2012	→ Varzim (loan)	28	(0)
2012–2014	Académico Viseu	46	(0)
2014–2016	Famalicão	48	(4)
2016–2018	Vilaverdense	56	(2)
2018	Fafe	7	(0)
2018–2020	Alverca	37	(2)
2020	Torreense	6	(0)
2021	GS Loures	9	(1)
2021–2022	Aliados Lordelo	26	(3)
2022–2023	Marco 09	21	(0)
2024	Celoricense	6	(0)

International career
2011–2015	Guinea-Bissau	10	(0)
- * Club domestic league appearances and goals

Ibraima So (born 30 November 1987) is a retired Bissau-Guinean footballer.
