= Nuno Campos =

Nuno Campos may refer to:

- Nuno Campos (footballer, born 1975), Portuguese former football midfielder and current manager
- Nuno Campos (footballer, born 1993), Portuguese football right-back
