= Lucas Paes =

Brazilian footballer

Personal information
- Full name: Lucas Paes Souza
- Date of birth: 7 December 1997 (age 28)
- Place of birth: São Bernardo do Campo, Brazil
- Height: 1.93 m (6 ft 4 in)
- Position: Goalkeeper

Team information
- Current team: Torreense
- Number: 1

Youth career
- 2014–2016: São Paulo

Senior career*
Years	Team	Apps	(Gls)
2016–2020	São Paulo	0	(0)
2019–2020	→ Louletano (loan)	19	(0)
2020	Vitória de Setúbal	2	(0)
2020–2024	Casa Pia	11	(0)
2024–	Torreense	54	(0)
- * Club domestic league appearances and goals as of 18 May 2026

Lucas Paes Souza (born 7 December 1997) is a Brazilian professional footballer who plays for Liga Portugal 2 club Torreense as a goalkeeper.

== Club career ==
Paes is a youth product of São Paulo, and in 2018 was due to transfer to Toronto FC. However, the transfer was called off as they found a genetic condition in his heart that threatened his playing career. Paes signed a professional contract with Vitória de Setúbal on 31 January 2020. Paes made his professional debut with Vitória de Setúbal in a 1-2 Primeira Liga loss to Rio Ave F.C. on 23 June 2020. On 20 November 2020 he transferred to Casa Pia where he acted as the backup goalkeeper Liga Portugal 2, and extended his contract with them in June 2022 after helping them earn promotion to the Primeira Liga.

== Honours ==
Torreense

- Taça de Portugal: 2025–26
