= Manu Pozo =

Spanish footballer (born 2001)

Personal information
- Full name: Manuel Pozo Guerrero
- Date of birth: 12 December 2001 (age 24)
- Place of birth: Casariche, Spain
- Height: 1.68 m (5 ft 6 in)
- Position: Winger

Team information
- Current team: Torreense
- Number: 11

Youth career
- ED Casariche
- Peloteros Sierra Sur
- 2017–2019: Calavera
- 2019–2020: Betis

Senior career*
| Years | Team | Apps | (Gls) |
| 2020–2021 | Betis B | 0 | (0) |
| 2020–2021 | → Covadonga (loan) | 26 | (3) |
| 2021–2022 | Sporting B | 30 | (11) |
| 2022–2024 | Valladolid B | 62 | (18) |
| 2023–2024 | Valladolid | 2 | (0) |
| 2024– | Torreense | 59 | (17) |
- * Club domestic league appearances and goals as of 18 May 2026

Manuel "Manu" Pozo Guerrero (born 12 December 2001) is a Spanish professional footballer who plays as a winger for Liga Portugal 2 club Torreense.

== Club career ==
Born in Casariche, Seville, Andalusia, Pozo joined Real Betis' youth setup in 2019, after representing Calavera CF, EF Peloteros Sierra Sur and ED Casariche. On 26 September 2020, after finishing his formation, he was loaned to Segunda División B side CD Covadonga for the season.

On 1 August 2021, Pozo signed for Sporting de Gijón and was assigned to the reserves in Tercera División RFEF. On 1 September 2022, he moved to another reserve team, Real Valladolid Promesas, in the Segunda Federación.

Pozo made his professional – and La Liga – debut for Real Valladolid's first team on 17 March 2023, coming on as a second-half substitute for Sergio Escudero in a 3–1 home loss against Athletic Bilbao.

On 10 July 2024, Pozo signed a three-year contract with Torreense in Portugal. On 3 January 2026, having established himself as a key player for the club, by scoring 17 goals and providing 16 assists in 56 appearances for the Torres Vedras-based side, he extended his contract with the club until June 2028.

== Honours ==
Torreense

- Taça de Portugal: 2025–26
