= A.D. Machico (volleyball) =

Portuguese volleyball team

Associação Desportiva de Machico
- Short name: A.D. Machico
- Ground: Machico, Madeira, Portugal
- Manager: (Portugal) Patricio Lopes
- League: A1 - Portugal
- 2005-06 season: Champion of A2
- Website: Club home page

Associação Desportiva de Machico is a volleyball team based in Machico, Madeira, Portugal. It plays in Portuguese Volleyball League A1. It is part of its parent club A.D. Machico, which also runs several football teams.

== Achievements ==
- Portuguese Volleyball League A2: 1 (2005/06)
- Men's National Champions Division I
  - 1999-00
- Youth National Champions Female
  - 1992-93
- Initiate National Champions Female
  - 1984-85, 1985-86
- National Minis Meeting
  - 2019
