= Brian Agbor =

Cameroonian footballer (born 2001)

Personal information
- Full name: Brian Emo Agbor
- Date of birth: 14 June 2001 (age 25)
- Place of birth: Cameroon
- Height: 1.80 m (5 ft 11 in)
- Position: Centre-back

Team information
- Current team: Torreense
- Number: 46

Youth career
- 2013–2021: Royal Antwerp
- 2021–2022: Gent

Senior career*
| Years | Team | Apps | (Gls) |
| 2022–2024 | Gent II | 31 | (1) |
| 2023–2024 | Gent | 8 | (0) |
| 2024– | Torreense | 25 | (0) |
- * Club domestic league appearances and goals as of 18 May 2026

Brian Emo Agbor (born 14 June 2001) is a Cameroonian professional footballer who plays as a centre-back for Liga Portugal 2 club Torreense.

== Early life ==
Agbor was born in Cameroon and moved to Belgium at a young age.

== Career ==
Agbor joined the youth academy of Royal Antwerp as a U13, and worked his way up their youth academies. He transferred to Gent in 2021 where he finished his development, and began his career with their reserves in 2022. Originally a midfielder, he converted to a centre-back in Gent. He made his senior and professional debut with Gent in a 2–0 Belgian First Division A loss to Club Brugge on 23 February 2023. On 27 February 2023, he extended his professional contract with the club until 2024 with an option for an additional year.

On 1 September 2024, Agbor joined Liga Portugal 2 club Torreense on a two-year contract.

== Honours ==
Torreense

- Taça de Portugal: 2025–26
