= Fua (footballer) =

Angolan footballer (born 1969)

Personal information
- Full name: Fernando José Gomes Pinto
- Date of birth: 7 April 1969 (age 57)
- Place of birth: Luanda, Portuguese Angola
- Height: 1.60 m (5 ft 3 in)
- Position: Winger

Youth career
- 1983–1986: Cruz
- 1986–1987: Boavista

Senior career*
Years	Team	Apps	(Gls)
1987–1988	Estarreja	33	(1)
1988–1989	Ovarense		
1989–1990	Leça		
1990–1991	Maia	34	(4)
1991–1992	Torreense	22	(2)
1992–1993	Académica	33	(7)
1993–1994	Boavista	5	(0)
1994–1997	Leiria	77	(3)
1997–1998	Moreirense	20	(1)
1998–1999	Machico	12	(0)
1999–2000	Oxford United		
2000	Esperança de Lagos		
2000–2001	Pombal	0	(0)
2001	Pedras Rubras		
2001–2002	Monchiquense		
2002–2003	Ferreiras		

International career
1996	Angola	3	(0)
- * Club domestic league appearances and goals

Fernando José Gomes Pinto (born 7 April 1969), better known as Fua, is an Angolan footballer who played as a winger. He played in three matches for the Angola national football team in 1996. He was also named in Angola's squad for the 1996 African Cup of Nations tournament.
