= Vítor Martins (football manager) =

Portuguese football manager (born 1985)

Personal information
- Full name: Vítor Emanuel Vieira Martins
- Date of birth: 1 June 1985 (age 41)
- Place of birth: Porto, Portugal

Team information
- Current team: Chaves (manager)

Managerial career
- Years: Team
- 2017–2018: Chaves (assistant)
- 2018–2019: Vitória Guimarães (assistant)
- 2019–2021: Porto B (assistant)
- 2021–2022: Leixões U23
- 2022–2023: Leixões
- 2023: Académico
- 2024–2025: Feirense
- 2025–2026: Torreense
- 2026–: Chaves

Vítor Emanuel Vieira Martins (born 1 June 1985) is a Portuguese football manager in charge of Liga Portugal 2 club Chaves. He had his first job as a senior head coach with Leixões in 2022, and has also led Académico, Feirense and Torreense in the second division.

== Career ==
=== Early career ===
Born in Porto, Martins began his career as a scout and analyst at FC Porto, before moving to G.D. Chaves as assistant to former Porto manager Luís Castro in 2017. He then followed his mentor in the same role at Vitória de Guimarães, and worked under the same capacity with Rui Barros at FC Porto B. On 27 September 2020, he was sent off for the latter in a 2–1 loss at F.C. Penafiel for taking an aggressive tone with the fourth official, and was fined €1,785.

=== Leixões and Académico ===
In 2021–22, Martins was the manager of Leixões S.C. under-23 team, before being appointed in charge of the first team at its conclusion. His debut on 8 August 2022 on the first day of the Liga Portugal 2 season was a goalless draw away to Penafiel, with his team having played over half the match after the sending-off of Evrard Zag; they went unbeaten for the first four games and kept three clean sheets.

Having finished one place above the relegation play-offs with the team from Matosinhos, Martins left on 20 June 2023 for fellow second-tier club Académico de Viseu F.C. on a two-year deal. He left by mutual consent on 23 October, having been eliminated from the Taça de Portugal and Taça da Liga, while having seven points from as many games in the league, being in 13th place.

=== Feirense ===
On 7 July 2024, Martins was appointed at C.D. Feirense, replacing Lito Vidigal who had kept the team up in a relegation playoff. The following 15 February, he conducted an interview after being sent off in a 2–1 win at F.C. Paços de Ferreira, for which his club were fined €3,570 and he was fined €357; subsequent proceedings into the game resulted in his 113-day suspension and €1,100 fine.

Having kept the team from Santa Maria da Feira in contention for the promotion playoffs, Martins was offered a new contract in April 2025, but he rejected it. Having spent most of the season in the top half of the table, the team finished in 8th.

=== Torreense ===
On 20 May 2025, Martins confirmed his fourth consecutive season with a different second-division side, joining S.C.U. Torreense who had finished 5th under Tiago Fernandes. On 1 January 2026, with the team in 9th, he was sacked and replaced by Luís Tralhão. Martins took the team to the quarter-finals of the Taça de Portugal, and played down his influence on their cup final victory under his successor.

=== Chaves ===
On 9 February 2026, Martins returned to Chaves, replacing Filipe Martins.

== Personal life ==
In May 2019, Martins married Joana Pinto da Costa, daughter of long-serving FC Porto president Jorge Nuno Pinto da Costa.
