= Arnau Casas =

Spanish footballer (born 2004)

Personal information
- Full name: Arnau Casas Arcas
- Date of birth: 15 March 2004 (age 22)
- Place of birth: Sant Cugat del Vallès, Spain
- Height: 1.82 m (6 ft 0 in)
- Position: Centre-back

Team information
- Current team: Unionistas (on loan from Torreense)
- Number: 20

Youth career
- Mira-Sol
- Sant Cugat
- –2019: Damm
- 2019–2023: Barcelona

Senior career*
Years	Team	Apps	(Gls)
2021–2023	Barcelona B	1	(0)
2023–2024	Sarpsborg 08	11	(0)
2024–2025	Cambuur	12	(0)
2025–	Torreense	21	(1)
2026–	→ Unionistas (loan)	2	(0)

International career^{‡}
2019–2020	Spain U16	4	(2)
2021–2022	Spain U18	10	(0)
2022–2023	Spain U19	14	(1)
- * Club domestic league appearances and goals as of 12 September 2026 ‡ National team caps and goals as of 14 July 2023

Arnau Casas Arcas (born 15 March 2004) is a Spanish professional footballer who plays as a defender for Primera Federación club Unionistas club on loan from Liga Portugal 2 club Torreense.

== Club career ==
Born in Sant Cugat del Vallès, Barcelona, Catalonia, Casas grew up aspiring to be a professional footballer, physiotherapist, or lawyer. He started playing youth football for Mira-Sol, Sant Cugat, and Damm, before joining the famed Barcelona academy in 2019.

In 2023, Casas joined Norwegian side Sarpsborg 08.

On 8 August 2024, Casas signed a contract with Cambuur in the Netherlands for two seasons, with an option for a third.

In June 2025, Casas signed a four-season contract with Portuguese club Torreense.

== International career ==
Casas represented Spain at the 2023 UEFA European Under-19 Championship, where they reached semi-finals.

== Style of play ==
Casas mainly operates as a defender and has been described as "due to the elegance of him taking the ball from behind, is reminiscent of Piqué. Also for his leadership in ordering the team from behind. He also has a quality that makes him very difficult to overcome: he skillfully handles both legs".

== Honours ==
Torreense

- Taça de Portugal: 2025–26
