= Marco Paiva =

Portuguese footballer

Personal information
- Full name: Marco Paulo Paiva Rocha
- Date of birth: 7 February 1973 (age 53)
- Place of birth: Funchal, Portugal
- Height: 1.73 m (5 ft 8 in)
- Position: Defensive midfielder

Youth career
- 1985–1990: Marítimo

Senior career*
Years	Team	Apps	(Gls)
1990–1994	Marítimo	95	(0)
1994–1995	Famalicão	28	(0)
1995–1997	Farense	62	(0)
1997–2001	Vitória Guimarães	116	(4)
2001–2004	Santa Clara	94	(2)
2004	Maia	14	(1)
2005–2007	União Madeira	53	(0)
2007–2010	Machico	66	(2)
Total		528	(9)

International career
1991–1993	Portugal U21	7	(1)
1998	Portugal	1	(0)

Managerial career
- 2010–2012: Machico
- * Club domestic league appearances and goals

Marco Paulo Paiva Rocha (born 7 February 1973), known as Paiva, is a Portuguese former professional football defensive midfielder and manager.

== Club career ==
Born in Funchal, Madeira, Paiva came through the ranks of his hometown team C.S. Marítimo. He totalled 337 Primeira Liga games and six goals for them, S.C. Farense, Vitória de Guimarães and C.D. Santa Clara.

In the Segunda Liga, Paiva added 72 appearances and one goal in service of F.C. Famalicão, Santa Clara and F.C. Maia.

== International career ==
Paiva earned one senior cap for Portugal on 19 August 1998, in a 2–1 friendly win over Mozambique at the Estádio de São Miguel in the Azores. He came on as a substitute for double goalscorer Rui Costa with five minutes of the 2–1 win remaining.
