= Costinha (footballer, born 1992) =

Portuguese footballer (born 1992)

Personal information
- Full name: João José Pereira da Costa
- Date of birth: 25 August 1992 (age 34)
- Place of birth: Coimbra, Portugal
- Height: 1.70 m (5 ft 7 in)
- Position: Attacking midfielder

Team information
- Current team: Torreense
- Number: 10

Youth career
- 2000–2006: Esperança Coimbra
- 2006–2009: Porto
- 2007–2008: → Padroense (loan)
- 2009–2011: Académica

Senior career*
Years	Team	Apps	(Gls)
2011	Sertanense	2	(0)
2011–2012	Tocha	20	(6)
2012–2013	Fredericia	35	(3)
2014–2015	Lusitano Vildemoinhos	48	(18)
2015–2019	Vitória Setúbal	100	(8)
2019	Chaves	22	(2)
2020–2023	Santa Clara	55	(0)
2023–2025	Tondela	59	(8)
2025–	Torreense	33	(5)
- * Club domestic league appearances and goals as of 22:52, 9 November 2026 (UTC)

João José Pereira da Costa (born 25 August 1992), known as Costinha, is a Portuguese professional footballer who plays as an attacking midfielder for Liga Portugal 2 club Torreense.

== Club career ==
Born in Coimbra, Costinha finished his youth career at local club Académica de Coimbra. His first season as a senior was split between amateurs Sertanense F.C. and U.D. Tocha.

In January 2014, after one and a half seasons in the Danish 1st Division with FC Fredericia, Costinha returned to his country's lower leagues after signing with Lusitano FCV. He moved straight to the Primeira Liga in summer 2015 after agreeing to a contract at Vitória de Setúbal, making his debut in the latter competition on 16 August in a 2–2 home draw against Boavista F.C. where he played the full 90 minutes and scoring his first goal the following weekend in the 4–0 away victory over Académica.

Costinha played 32 matches in both the 2016–17 and 2017–18 campaigns. He scored once and twice respectively, as his team managed to consecutively avoid relegation.

On 15 January 2019, Costinha joined fellow top-division side G.D. Chaves on a two-and-a-half-year deal worth €170,000, as his link at the Estádio do Bonfim was about to expire. In his second appearance of a season that ended in relegation, he scored the only goal away to Portimonense SC. On 10 August, in the club's first game back in the Liga Portugal 2, he was sent off in a 3–0 loss at C.D. Nacional.

Costinha returned to the top flight at the start of 2020, on a three-year contract at C.D. Santa Clara. On 22 July the following year, he scored on his European debut as a late substitute at KF Shkupi, concluding a 3–0 away win in the second qualifying round of the UEFA Europa Conference League. He had an operation in August 2021 on his right Achilles tendon, and was not expected to return until March.

On 23 June 2023, Costinha signed a two-year deal with second-division C.D. Tondela. After it expired, the 32-year-old joined S.C.U. Torreense in the same league. In his first season at the latter, he contributed six appearances in their victorious run in the Taça de Portugal, scoring in 2–1 the away defeat of Casa Pia A.C. in the round of 16; they consequently qualified for the league phase of the UEFA Europa League, but he was left out of the squad by manager Luís Tralhão.

== Honours ==
Tondela

- Liga Portugal 2: 2024–25

Torreense

- Taça de Portugal: 2025–26
