= Julien Lomboto =

French footballer (born 2002)

Personal information
- Full name: Julien Lomboto Lompombi
- Date of birth: 13 May 2002 (age 24)
- Place of birth: Amiens, France
- Height: 1.92 m (6 ft 4 in)
- Position: Centre-back

Team information
- Current team: Rio Ave
- Number: 63

Youth career
- Amiens
- 2018–2020: US Camon

Senior career*
Years	Team	Apps	(Gls)
2020–2022	Strasbourg II	26	(2)
2022–	Rio Ave	10	(0)
2024	→ Oliveirense (loan)	12	(0)
2024–2025	→ Torreense (loan)	26	(1)
- * Club domestic league appearances and goals as of 25 May 2026

Julien Lomboto Lompombi (born 13 May 2002) is a French professional footballer who plays as a centre-back for Primeira Liga club Rio Ave.

== Professional career ==
Lomboto is a youth product of the academies of Amiens and Camon. On 11 March 2020, he transferred to Strasbourg where he captained their reserves. On 6 August 2022, he transferred to the Portuguese club Rio Ave. He made his senior and professional debut with Rio Ave as a late substitute in a 2–0 Primeira Liga win over Santa Clara on 17 March 2023.

On 16 January 2024, Rio Ave sent Lomboto on loan to Liga Portugal 2 side Oliveirense until the end of the season.

== Personal life ==
Born in France, Lomboto is of Congolese (DR) descent.
