= Stopira =

Cape Verdean footballer (born 1988)

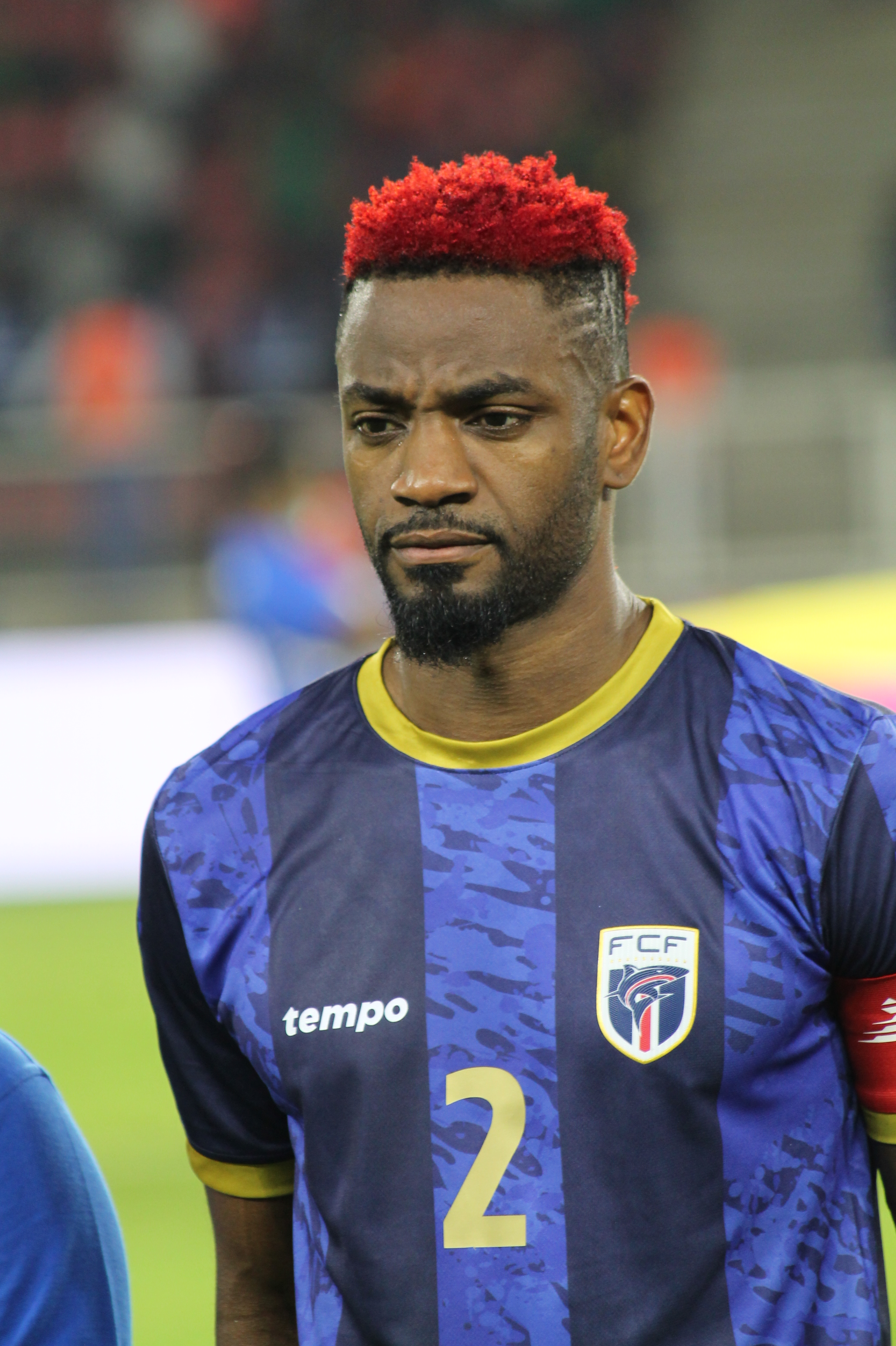
- Stopira in 2022

Personal information
- Full name: Ianique dos Santos Tavares
- Date of birth: 20 May 1988 (age 38)
- Place of birth: Praia, Cape Verde
- Height: 1.80 m (5 ft 11 in)
- Position: Left-back

Team information
- Current team: Torreense
- Number: 2

Senior career*
Years	Team	Apps	(Gls)
2006–2008	Sporting Praia		
2008–2010	Santa Clara	32	(0)
2010–2011	Deportivo La Coruña B	23	(0)
2011–2012	Feirense	15	(0)
2012–2023	Fehérvár	265	(22)
2024–	Torreense	68	(4)

International career^{‡}
2008–	Cape Verde	62	(4)
- * Club domestic league appearances and goals as of 22:31, 22 November 2026 (UTC) ‡ National team caps and goals as of 22:31, 22 November 2026 (UTC)

Ianique dos Santos Tavares (Portuguese: [ja.ˈni.kɨ duʃ ˈsɐ̃.tuʃ ta.ˈva.ɾɨʃ]; born 20 May 1988), commonly known as Stopira (Kabuverdianu: [sto.ˈpi.ɾɐ]), is a Cape Verdean professional footballer who plays as a left-back for Liga Portugal 2 club Torreense and the Cape Verde national team.

He spent most of his career in Hungary with Fehérvár, having signed for the club in 2012.

== Club career ==
Stopira was born in Praia. In 2008, he signed for Portugal's Santa Clara from local side Sporting da Praia, playing just six matches in his first season but being first choice in the following as the Azores team competed in the Segunda Liga.

On 10 July 2010, after a thwarted transfer to Primeira Liga club Vitória de Guimarães, Stopira signed a four-year contract with Deportivo de La Coruña in Spain, with 75% of his right being owned by IberSports. He spent his only season, however, with the reserves in the Segunda División B.

Stopira joined newly promoted Feirense ahead of the 2011–12 campaign, on a one-year deal. He made his debut in the Portuguese top flight on 20 August 2011, coming on as a late substitute in a 3–1 away loss against Benfica.

In summer 2012, Stopira moved to Fehérvár in Hungary. He remained there for 11 years, notably winning the 2014–15 and 2017–18 editions of the Nemzeti Bajnokság I.

Stopira returned to Portugal on 27 July 2024, with the 36-year-old agreeing to a deal at second-tier Torreense. He scored twice in eight games as the club won the 2025–26 Taça de Portugal for the first major trophy in its 109-year history, from penalties; the first goal was in the second leg of the semi-finals against Fafe (2–0 win, 3–1 on aggregate), and the second in the decisive match to help defeat holders Sporting CP 2–1.

== International career ==
Stopira received his first call-up to the Cape Verde national team in May 2008, for a friendly with Luxembourg and a 2010 FIFA World Cup qualifier against Cameroon. He was an unused substitute in the first two qualifying matches, and made his competitive debut against Mauritius on 22 June of that year, replacing Nando in the dying minutes.

On 24 May 2010, Stopira appeared in a friendly in Covilhã with Portugal – who were preparing for the FIFA World Cup in South Africa – playing the entire match as the minnows (ranked 117th) managed a 0–0 draw. He also won the 2009 Lusofonia Games with the under-21 team.

In May 2026, Stopira was named in Cape Verde's 2026 FIFA World Cup squad for that year's World Cup, in their first-ever participation in the tournament.

== Personal life ==
Stopira received his nickname in honour of former French international Yannick Stopyra. In December 2019, he acquired Hungarian citizenship via naturalization.

== Career statistics ==
=== Club ===
As of match played 15 May 2022

Appearances and goals by club, season and competition
Club	Season	League			National cup (Note: Includes Taça de Portugal, Magyar Kupa)		League cup (Note: Includes Taça da Liga, Ligakupa)		Europe		Total	
Club	Season	Division	Apps	Goals	Apps	Goals	Apps	Goals	Apps	Goals	Apps	Goals
Santa Clara	2008–09	Liga de Honra	6	0	0	0	0	0	0	0	6	0
Santa Clara	2009–10	Liga de Honra	26	0	2	0	2	0	0	0	30	0
Santa Clara	Total		32	0	2	0	2	0	0	0	36	0
Deportivo B	2010–11	Segunda División B	23	0	0	0	0	0	0	0	23	0
Feirense	2011–12	Primeira Liga	15	0	1	0	2	0	0	0	18	0
Fehérvár	2012–13	Nemzeti Bajnokság I	9	0	3	0	3	0	8 (Note: Appearances in UEFA Europa League)	0	23	0
Fehérvár	2013–14	Nemzeti Bajnokság I	29	1	0	0	3	0	1	0	33	1
Fehérvár	2014–15	Nemzeti Bajnokság I	25	1	4	0	0	0	—		29	1
Fehérvár	2015–16	Nemzeti Bajnokság I	16	2	2	1	—		—		18	3
Fehérvár	2016–17	Nemzeti Bajnokság I	24	5	3	0	—		5	0	32	5
Fehérvár	2017–18	Nemzeti Bajnokság I	31	1	0	0	—		8	1	39	2
Fehérvár	2018–19	Nemzeti Bajnokság I	28	3	6	0	—		14 (Note: Eight appearances in UEFA Champions League, six appearances and one goal in UEFA Europa League)	1	48	4
Fehérvár	2019–20	Nemzeti Bajnokság I	21	3	7	1	—		4	1	32	5
Fehérvár	2020–21	Nemzeti Bajnokság I	31	3	5	2	—		4	0	40	5
Fehérvár	2021–22	Nemzeti Bajnokság I	26	1	2	0	—		2 (Note: Appearances in UEFA Europa Conference League)	0	30	1
Fehérvár	Total		240	20	32	4	6	0	46	3	325	27
Career total			310	20	35	4	10	0	46	3	401	27

=== International ===
As of match played 31 May 2026

Appearances and goals by national team and year
National team	Year	Apps	Goals
Cape Verde
Cape Verde	2008	1	0
Cape Verde	2010	4	0
Cape Verde	2011	3	0
Cape Verde	2012	4	0
Cape Verde	2013	1	0
Cape Verde	2014	2	0
Cape Verde	2015	6	0
Cape Verde	2016	5	0
Cape Verde	2017	4	0
Cape Verde	2018	3	1
Cape Verde	2019	3	0
Cape Verde	2020	3	0
Cape Verde	2021	8	2
Cape Verde	2022	9	0
Cape Verde	2023	2	0
Cape Verde	2025	2	1
Cape Verde	2026	1	0
Total		61	4

Cape Verde score listed first, score column indicates score after each Stopira goal.

List of international goals scored by Stopira
No.	Date	Venue	Opponent	Score	Result	Competition
1	12 October 2018	Estádio Nacional de Cabo Verde, Praia, Cape Verde	Tanzania	3–0	3–0	2019 Africa Cup of Nations qualification
2	13 November 2021	Estádio Municipal Adérito Sena, Mindelo, Cape Verde	Central African Republic	2–1	2–1	2022 FIFA World Cup qualification
3	16 November 2021	Teslim Balogun Stadium, Lagos, Nigeria	Nigeria	1–1	1–1	2022 FIFA World Cup qualification
4	13 October 2025	Estádio Nacional de Cabo Verde, Praia, Cape Verde	Eswatini	3–0	3–0	2026 FIFA World Cup qualification

== Honours ==
Fehérvár

- Nemzeti Bajnokság I: 2014–15, 2017–18
- Magyar Kupa: 2018–19

Torreense

- Taça de Portugal: 2025–26
