= Nuno Campos (footballer, born 1993) =

Portuguese footballer

Personal information
- Full name: Nuno Vieira Campos
- Date of birth: 13 June 1993 (age 33)
- Place of birth: Funchal, Portugal
- Height: 1.76 m (5 ft 9 in)
- Position: Right-back

Team information
- Current team: Machico

Youth career
- 2001–2012: Nacional

Senior career*
Years	Team	Apps	(Gls)
2012−2020	Nacional	95	(1)
2020−2021	Mafra	33	(1)
2021−2022	Chaves	23	(0)
2022−2024	Torreense	43	(1)
2024–2025	Portimonense	7	(0)
2025–	Machico	25	(3)
- * Club domestic league appearances and goals as of 12:36, 28 October 2026 (UTC)

Nuno Vieira Campos (born 13 June 1993) is a Portuguese professional footballer who plays as a right-back for Campeonato de Portugal club Machico.

He began his career at Nacional, playing 114 games and earning promotion to the Primeira Liga twice.

== Club career ==
Born in Funchal, Madeira, Campos played from the age of 8 at hometown side C.D. Nacional. He made his professional debut on 9 January 2013 in a dead rubber Taça da Liga group fixture against G.D. Estoril Praia, in which he was one of three young debutants in the 1–0 home win. His Primeira Liga bow took place 18 days later, in a 2–0 away victory over Vitória de Setúbal where he came on as a 56th-minute substitute for Miguel Rodrigues.

Campos featured rarely for Nacional over the ensuing years. After their relegation in 2017, he played all but one games the following season to promote immediately as champions, and scored his only goal for the Alvinegros on 18 March to open a 3–0 defeat of Varzim S.C. at the Estádio da Madeira. On 15 July 2020, having appeared in just three matches as the club was promoted again, he rescinded his contract.

On 16 July 2020, Campos signed for C.D. Mafra in the Liga Portugal 2. A year later, he moved to G.D. Chaves of the same league.

Campos remained in the second division the following three seasons, first on a contract at S.C.U. Torreense. On 23 August 2024, he agreed to a one-year deal with Portimonense S.C. with the possibility of a one-year extension.
