= Luis Quintero =

Colombian footballer (born 2004)

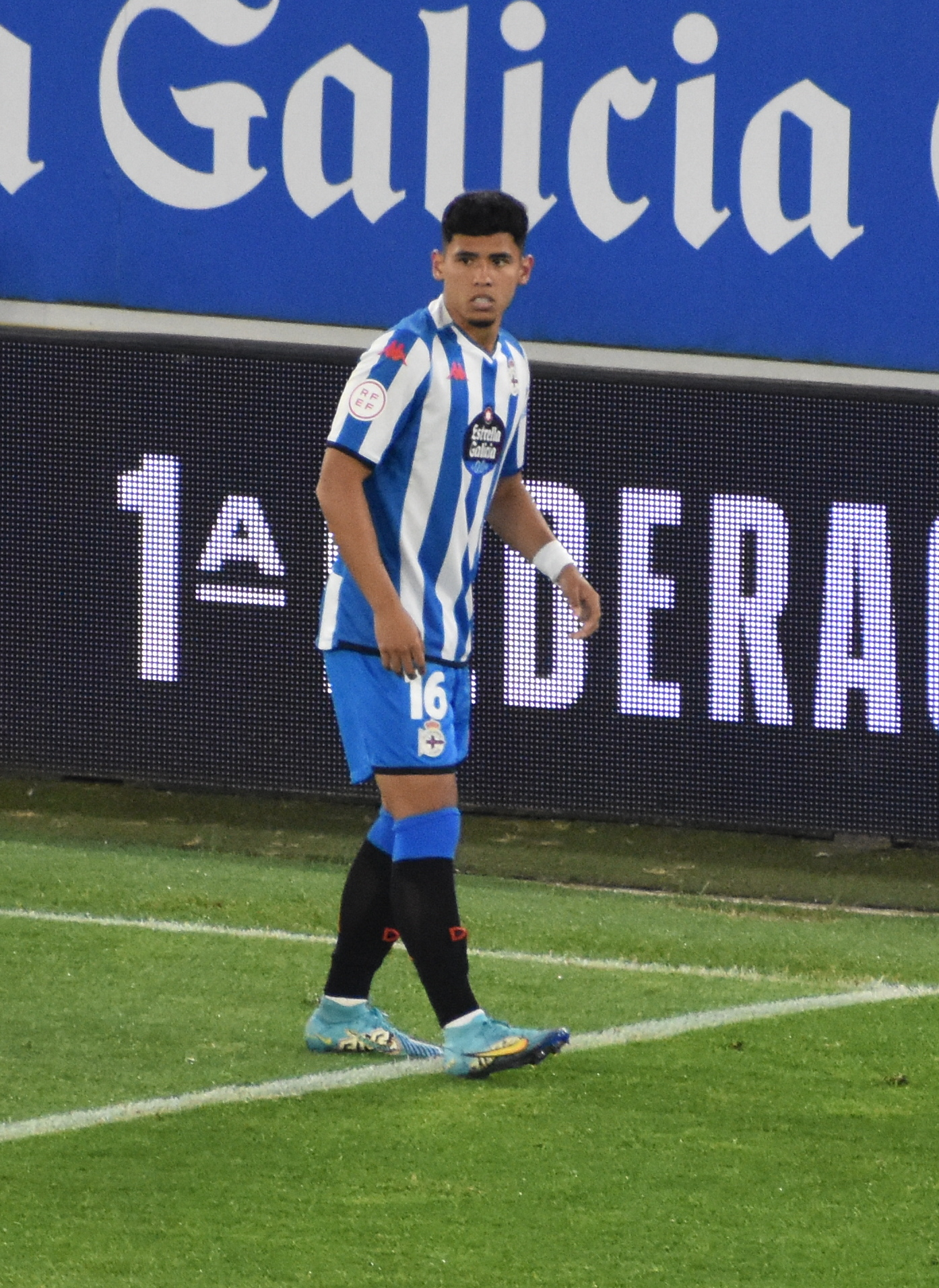

Personal information
- Full name: Luis Eduardo Quintero Hernández
- Date of birth: 12 October 2004 (age 22)
- Place of birth: Alicante, Spain
- Height: 1.78 m (5 ft 10 in)
- Position: Winger

Team information
- Current team: Torreense
- Number: 29

Youth career
- Elche
- 2014–2017: Kelme
- 2017–2020: Villarreal
- 2020–2022: Roda
- 2022–2023: Villarreal

Senior career*
Years	Team	Apps	(Gls)
2022–2024	Villarreal C	3	(0)
2023–2024	→ Amorebieta (loan)	18	(0)
2024	→ Deportivo La Coruña (loan)	4	(0)
2024–2026	Villarreal B	41	(4)
2026–	Torreense	12	(1)

International career^{‡}
2020	Colombia U16	3	(0)
2022	Colombia U20	1	(0)
- * Club domestic league appearances and goals as of 18 May 2026 ‡ National team caps and goals as of 20:06, 20 January 2026 (UTC)

Luis Eduardo Quintero Hernández (born 12 October 2004) is a professional footballer who plays as a winger for Liga Portugal 2 club Torreense. Born in Spain, he is a youth international for Colombia.

== Early life ==
Quintero was born in Alicante, Valencian Community, Spain to Colombian parents from Palmira in the Valle del Cauca Department.

== Club career ==
Quintero began his career with Elche and Kelme, before joining the academy of Villarreal in 2017. He spent the 2020–21 and 2021–22 seasons with Villarreal subsidiary Roda. Returning to Villarreal for the 2022–23 season, he made his debut for the club's C-team in the Tercera Federación on 25 September 2022, coming on as a second-half substitute for Sergio Hinojosa against Rayo Ibense and providing the assist for Villarreal's second goal in an eventual 2–1 win.

On 6 July 2023, Quintero was loaned to Segunda División side Amorebieta for the season. He made his professional debut on 11 August, starting in a 1–1 home draw against Levante.

On 31 January 2024, Quintero joined Deportivo de La Coruña on loan for the remainder of the season with the option to buy.

On 20 January 2026, Quintero left Villarreal and joined Liga Portugal 2 club Torreense.

== International career ==
Quintero was first called up to represent Colombia for an under-16 tournament in Portugal in early 2020, where he featured in games against Germany, the Netherlands and hosts Portugal. He was called up to the under-20 side for the 2022 Maurice Revello Tournament, expressing his pride in being able to represent the nation. He would go on to feature in one game, coming on as a second-half substitution for Daniel Luna in a 2–1 win against Japan, as Colombia finished fourth in the tournament.

Ahead of the 2023 FIFA U-20 World Cup, Quintero was controversially left out of the preliminary squad by manager Héctor Cárdenas, with Cárdenas stating that despite Quintero being on the list of considered players, he had opted to call up Daniel Luna instead. Quintero responded by posting his season statistics on his personal Twitter account, as well as stating "there are things that do not depend on oneself, but life keeps us firm". He followed this up with a Tweet congratulating his compariots on their call-ups.

Quintero remains eligible to represent Spain at international level, and the Royal Spanish Football Federation (RFEF) first showed interest in the forward in May 2022, with Spanish sports radio programme Carrusel Deportivo stating that the RFEF were attempting to convince Quintero to switch allegiance. Following his snub from the Colombian under-20 side ahead of the 2023 FIFA U-20 World Cup, it was reported by another radio broadcaster, Cadena SER, that the RFEF would once again try to convince Quintero to represent Spain.

== Style of play ==
In his youth career, Quintero mostly featured as both an enganche and a right winger, and this continued during his time at Villarreal, where he also spent time playing as a midfielder. A left-footed player, he scored a number of goals for Villarreal's youth team by cutting in from the right wing and shooting.

== Personal life ==
Quintero is the cousin of fellow professional footballer Juan Sebastián Quintero.

== Career statistics ==
=== Club ===
As of 5 July 2023.

Appearances and goals by club, season and competition
Club	Season	League			Cup		Other		Total	
Club	Season	Division	Apps	Goals	Apps	Goals	Apps	Goals	Apps	Goals
Villarreal C	2022–23	Tercera Federación	3	0	0	0	0	0	3	0
Career total			3	0	0	0	0	0	3	0

== Honours ==
Torreense

- Taça de Portugal: 2025–26
