= Álex Alfaro =

Spanish footballer

Personal information
- Full name: Alejandro Alfaro Cascales
- Date of birth: 15 June 2002 (age 24)
- Place of birth: Alicante, Spain
- Height: 1.83 m (6 ft 0 in)
- Position: Midfielder

Team information
- Current team: Torreense
- Number: 6

Youth career
- 2014–2018: Valencia
- 2018–2021: Elche

Senior career*
Years	Team	Apps	(Gls)
2021–2023	Elche B	60	(3)
2022–2023	Elche	1	(0)
2023–2024	Alzira	14	(1)
2024–2025	Deportivo B	48	(9)
2024–2025	Deportivo La Coruña	1	(0)
2025–	Torreense	21	(0)
- * Club domestic league appearances and goals as of 19 June 2026

Alejandro "Álex" Alfaro Cascales (born 15 June 2002) is a Spanish professional footballer who plays as a midfielder for Liga Portugal 2 club Torreense.

== Club career ==
After playing for four years in the youth categories of Valencia CF, Alfaro joined Elche CF in 2018. He made his senior debut with the latter's reserves on 4 September 2021, starting in a 1–1 Tercera División RFEF home draw against Hércules CF B.

Alfaro scored his first senior goal on 5 January 2022, netting the B's second in a 2–2 away draw against the same opponent. In July, he was included in the first team's pre-season, before making his professional – and La Liga – debut on 15 August, after coming on as a second-half substitute for Gerard Gumbau in a 3–0 away loss against Real Betis.

On 19 August 2023, Alfaro left Elche and signed for Segunda Federación side UD Alzira. The following 6 January, he moved to Deportivo de La Coruña, being initially assigned to the B-team also in division four.

In June 2025, Alfaro moved abroad and signed a contract with Torreense in Portugal.

== Honours ==
Torreense

- Taça de Portugal: 2025–26
