= Aboubacar Ali Abdallah =

Footballer (born 2006)

Personal information
- Date of birth: 2 April 2006 (age 20)
- Place of birth: Sainte-Marie, Réunion, France
- Height: 1.82 m (6 ft 0 in)
- Position: Forward

Team information
- Current team: Francs Borains
- Number: 10

Youth career
- 2014–2019: Entente Solidaire de la Convenance
- 2019: AS Bretagne
- 2019–2022: Saint-Denis FC
- 2019–2020: Entente Solidaire de la Convenance
- 2022–2023: Strasbourg

Senior career*
Years	Team	Apps	(Gls)
2023–2025	Strasbourg B	11	(2)
2024–2025	Strasbourg	9	(0)
2024–2025	→ Nîmes (loan)	10	(1)
2025	→ Torreense (loan)	5	(0)
2025–	Francs Borains	27	(6)

International career^{‡}
2022	France U16	1	(0)
2024	France U19	3	(1)
2025–	Comoros	2	(0)
- * Club domestic league appearances and goals as of 20 April 2026 ‡ National team caps and goals as of 00:22, 24 August 2025 (UTC)

Aboubacar Ali Abdallah (born 2 April 2006) is a professional footballer who plays as a forward for Challenger Pro League club Francs Borains. Born in Réunion, he plays for the Comoros national team.

== Club career ==
Born in Réunion, an overseas department of France, Ali Abdallah began his youth career on his native island with Entente Solidaire de la Convenance. He went on to play for AS Bretagne, Saint-Denis FC, and Entente Solidaire de la Convenance again before heading to metropolitan France to join Strasbourg's youth academy in January 2022.

On 10 March 2024, Ali Abdallah made his Ligue 1 debut as a substitute in a 1–0 defeat to Monaco. His first goal contribution came in a 3–1 win over Reims on 13 April, an assist for a goal by Moïse Sahi Dion. On 18 April, Ali Abdallah signed his first professional contract with Strasbourg, a deal until 2027. On 30 August 2024, Ali Abdallah was loaned out to Championnat National club Nîmes for the rest of the season. His loan was cut short in early January 2025. On 8 January 2025, Ali Abdallah moved on a new loan to Torreense in Portugal.

On 24 July 2025, Ali Abdallah signed for Challenger Pro League club Francs Borains.

== International career ==
Ali Abdallah represented France at youth international level. He made his debut for the France under-16s in a 2–1 friendly win over Germany on 5 May 2022.

In March 2025, Ali Abdallah switched his allegiance to the Comoros national team and received his first call-up. He made his debut in a 3–0 defeat to Mali in FIFA World Cup qualification on 20 March 2025.

On 11 December 2025, Ali Abdallah was called up to the Comoros squad for the 2025 Africa Cup of Nations.

== Personal life ==
Born in Sainte-Marie, Réunion, Ali Abdallah is of Comorian descent from Mayotte and Malagasy descent. He holds Comorian and French nationality.
