= Carlos Rentería (footballer, born 1995) =

Colombian footballer

Personal information
- Full name: Carlos Enrique Rentería Olaya
- Date of birth: 5 July 1995 (age 31)
- Place of birth: Buenaventura, Colombia
- Height: 1.87 m (6 ft 2 in)
- Position: Defensive midfielder

Team information
- Current team: Ethnikos
- Number: 77

Senior career*
Years	Team	Apps	(Gls)
2013–2016	Deportivo Cali	11	(0)
2017	Juárez	8	(0)
2017–2019	Deportes Tolima	73	(1)
2020–2021	Botafogo	12	(0)
2021	Sport	0	(0)
2021–2022	Académico de Viseu	27	(0)
2022–2024	Torreense	50	(3)
2024–2025	Al-Quwa Al-Jawiya		
2025	Feirense	13	(0)
2025–2026	Song Lam Nghe An	10	(0)
2026–	Ethnikos	15	(0)

International career^{‡}
2014	Colombia U21	4	(0)
- * Club domestic league appearances and goals as of 14 June 2026 ‡ National team caps and goals as of 4 September 2020

Carlos Enrique Rentería Olaya, known as Neneco (born 5 July 1995) is a Colombian professional footballer who plays as a defensive midfielder for Cypriot First Division club Ethnikos.

== Club career ==
On 25 August 2021, he signed with Portuguese club Académico de Viseu.

On 17 August 2022, Rentería moved to Torreense.
