= Casariche =

- city
- Flag Coat of arms
- Interactive map of Casariche
- Coordinates: 37°17′N 4°45′W
- Country: Spain
- Province: Seville
- Municipality: Casariche

Area
  - Total: 52.90 km^{2} (20.42 sq mi)
- Elevation: 296 m (971 ft)

Population (2025-01-01)
  - Total: 5,291
  - Density: 100.0/km^{2} (259.0/sq mi)
- Time zone: UTC+1 (CET)
  - Summer (DST): UTC+2 (CEST)

Casariche is a city located in the province of Seville, Spain. According to the 2006 census (INE), the city has a population of 5414 inhabitants.

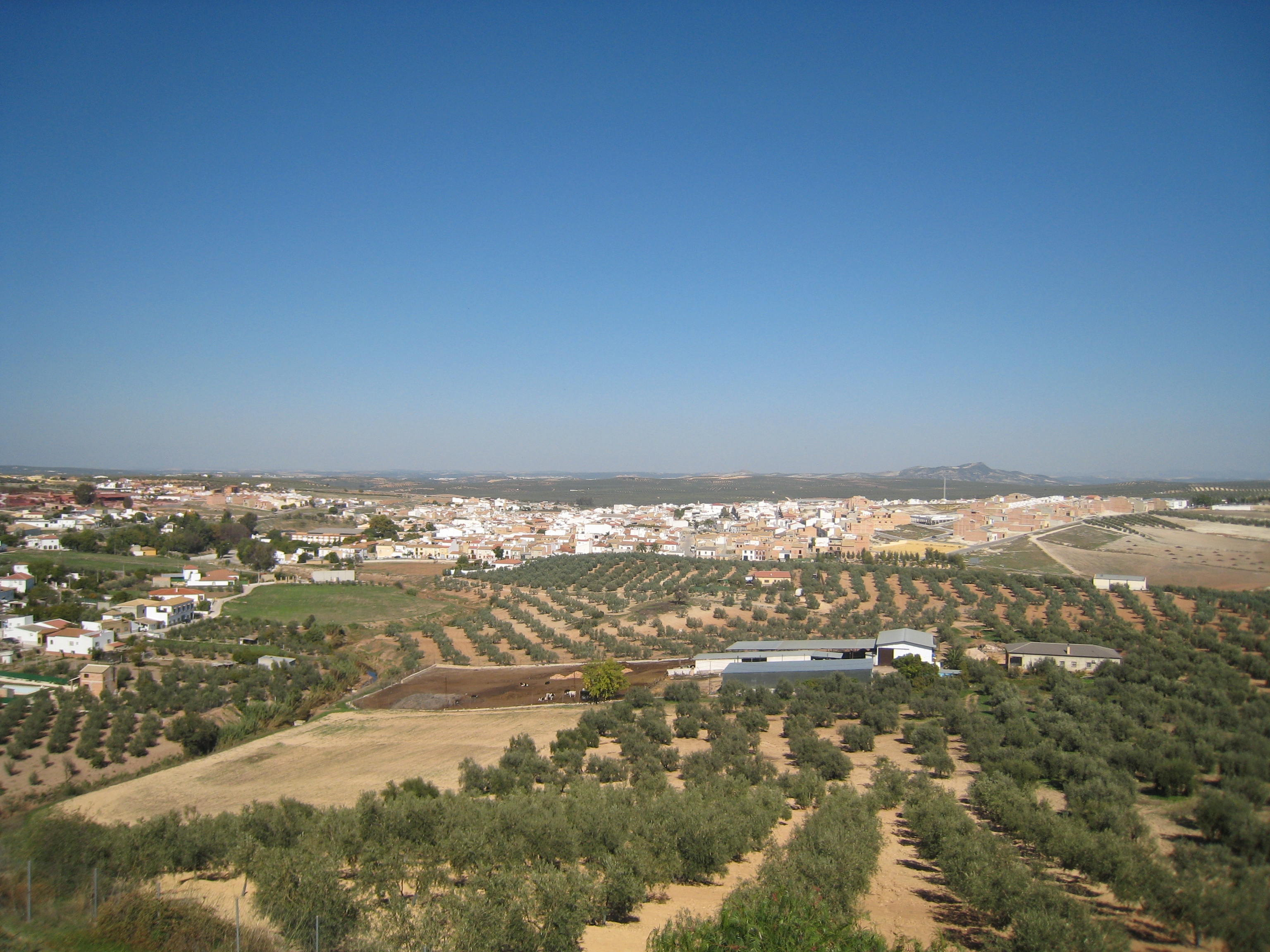
Panoramic view of Casariche, view from Cerro Bellido

== See also ==
- List of municipalities in Seville
