= João Tralhão =

Portuguese football manager (born 1980)

Personal information
- Full name: João Carlos Valado Tralhão
- Date of birth: 3 September 1980 (age 46)
- Place of birth: Lisbon, Portugal

Team information
- Current team: Real Madrid (assistant)

Managerial career
- Years: Team
- 2018–2019: Monaco (assistant)
- 2020–2021: Vilafranquense
- 2023–2024: Antalyaspor (assistant)
- 2024–2025: Borussia Dortmund (assistant)
- 2025: Fenerbahçe (assistant)
- 2025–2026: Benfica (assistant)
- 2026–: Real Madrid (assistant)

João Carlos Valado Tralhão (born 3 September 1980) is a Portuguese football manager who is assistant coach of La Liga club Real Madrid.

He worked with the youth teams of Benfica from 2002 to 2018. From 2025, he assisted José Mourinho at Fenerbahçe, Benfica and Real Madrid.

== Career ==
Born in Lisbon, Tralhão worked with Benfica's youth teams from 2002. In 2011, he took charge of the under-19 team, and in June 2018 he was promoted to the under-23 team.

In October 2018, Tralhão left to be first-team assistant manager to Thierry Henry at Monaco, leaving Benfica under-23 to his older brother Luís Tralhão. At the end of January, with Monaco having dismissed Henry and replaced him with Leonardo Jardim, Tralhão left.

On 28 October 2020, having spent the previous season without a club, Tralhão was named as a senior head coach for the first time, succeeding Quim Machado at Vilafranquense, second-last in Liga Portugal 2. His debut three days later was a goalless draw away to Chaves. He left on the following 9 March, after ten games without a win; his last game was a 2–2 draw at home to Sporting da Covilhã, conceding the equaliser in added time.

In August 2023, Tralhão signed a one-year deal to assist Nuri Şahin at Antalyaspor in Turkey. The following July, he moved with Şahin to Borussia Dortmund.

Tralhão went back to Turkey in June 2025, to assist compatriot José Mourinho at Fenerbahçe. Dismissed at the end of August, they returned to Benfica in September. Mourinho was sent off in a UEFA Champions League knockout playoff first leg against Real Madrid, meaning that Tralhão took over his media and coaching duties for the second leg on 25 February 2026; his side lost 2–1 at the Bernabéu (3–1 aggregate).

On 10 June 2026, Tralhão announced the end of nearly two decades of work with Benfica, as he followed Mourinho to Real Madrid.
