= Keffel =

Brazilian footballer

Personal information
- Full name: Keffel Resende Alvim
- Date of birth: 27 September 1999 (age 27)
- Place of birth: Lavras, Brazil
- Height: 1.79 m (5 ft 10 in)
- Position: Left-back

Team information
- Current team: Sumgayit
- Number: 80

Youth career
- –2017: Figueirense
- 2018–2019: São Caetano

Senior career*
Years	Team	Apps	(Gls)
2019	São Caetano	0	(0)
2020	Retrô	3	(0)
2020–2022	Trofense	45	(1)
2022–2024	Torreense	41	(1)
2024–2025	Paysandu	1	(0)
2025	→ Portimonense (loan)	12	(0)
2025–	Sumgayit	26	(0)
- * Club domestic league appearances and goals as of 22 June 2026

Keffel Resende Alvim (born 27 September 1999), commonly known as Keffel, is a Brazilian professional footballer who plays as a left-back for Azerbaijani club Sumgayit.

== Career ==
On 14 July 2022, Keffel signed with Liga Portugal 2 club Torreense.

On 11 August 2025, Keffel moved to Sumgayit in Azerbaijan on a two-season contract, with an optional third year.

== Career statistics ==
=== Club ===
As of 17 November 2020

Club	Season	League			State league		National cup		League cup		Other		Total	
Club	Season	Division	Apps	Goals	Apps	Goals	Apps	Goals	Apps	Goals	Apps	Goals	Apps	Goals
São Caetano	2019	Série D	0	0	0	0	0	0	–		1 (Note: Appearances in the Copa Paulista)	0	1	0
Retrô	2020	–			3 (Note: Appearances in the Campeonato Pernambucano)	0	0	0	–		0	0	3	0
Trofense	2020–21	Campeonato de Portugal	2	0	–		1 (Note: Appearances in the Taça de Portugal)	1	0	0	0	0	3	1
Career total			2	0	3	0	1	1	0	0	1	0	7	1
