= Carlos Henriques =

Portuguese footballer

Personal information
- Full name: Carlos Daniel Anastácio Henriques
- Date of birth: 7 July 1993 (age 33)
- Place of birth: Silves, Portugal
- Height: 1.84 m (6 ft 1/2 in)
- Position: Goalkeeper

Team information
- Current team: Torreense
- Number: 99

Youth career
- 2001–2007: Silves
- 2007–2008: Imortal
- 2008–2009: Silves
- 2009–2012: Portimonense

Senior career*
| Years | Team | Apps | (Gls) |
| 2012–2020 | Portimonense | 11 | (0) |
| 2018–2019 | → Paços Ferreira (loan) | 2 | (0) |
| 2019–2020 | → Covilhã (loan) | 24 | (0) |
| 2020–2021 | Mafra | 14 | (0) |
| 2021– | Torreense | 21 | (0) |
- * Club domestic league appearances and goals as of 20 June 2024

Carlos Daniel Anastácio Henriques (born 7 July 1993) is a Portuguese professional footballer who plays as a goalkeeper for Liga Portugal 2 club Torreense.

== Club career ==
Born in Silves, Algarve, Henriques played for three local clubs as a youth, finishing his development at Portimonense SC. He never made more than five Segunda Liga appearances in his first six seasons as a senior, his first coming on 14 January 2012 in a 1–2 home loss against C.F. União.

Henriques played his first match in the Primeira Liga on 5 May 2018 – his sole of the campaign – on 5 May 2018, in a 3–2 away defeat to C.F. Os Belenenses. He spent the following three years in the second division, with F.C. Paços de Ferreira, S.C. Covilhã (both on loan) and C.D. Mafra.

On 5 July 2021, Henriques signed with Liga 3 side S.C.U. Torreense.
