= João Nuno =

Portuguese football manager (born 1971)

Personal information
- Full name: João Nuno Rodrigues Carromeu
- Date of birth: 9 September 1985 (age 41)
- Place of birth: Moita, Portugal
- Height: 1.84 m (6 ft 0 in)
- Position: Midfielder

Youth career
- 1995–2004: UFC Moitense

Senior career*
| Years | Team | Apps | (Gls) |
| 2004–2005 | UFC Moitense | | |
| 2005–2008 | 1º de Maio Sarilhense | | |
| 2008–2010 | Fabril Barreiro | 41 | (5) |
| 2010–2016 | Barreirense | 127 | (6) |
| 2016–2019 | UFC Moitense | | |

Managerial career
- 2016–2019: Barreirense (youth)
- 2019: Cova Piedade B
- 2020–2021: Leixões (assistant)
- 2021–2023: Fabril Barreiro
- 2023–2025: 1º Dezembro
- 2025: Belenenses
- 2025–2026: Estrela Amadora
- * Club domestic league appearances and goals

João Nuno Rodrigues Carromeu (born 9 September 1985), known as João Nuno, is a Portuguese football manager and former player who played as a midfielder.

== Playing career ==
Born in Moita, João Nuno was a youth product of hometown side UFC Moitense. After making his first team debut in 2004, he moved to 1º de Maio Sarilhense in the following year.

In 2008, João Nuno joined Terceira Divisão side Fabril Barreiro. He signed for Barreirense in 2010, and helped the team to achieve promotion to the fourth tier in 2012.

In 2016, after playing in two Campeonato de Portugal seasons with Barreirense, João Nuno returned to his first club UFC Moitense. He retired in 2019, aged 33.

== Managerial career ==
Upon returning to Moitense in 2016, João Nuno began his managerial career after being in charge of Barreirense's youth sides. On 30 August 2019, he was appointed manager of Cova Piedade's reserve team in the regional leagues, but was dismissed on 20 December of that year.

In October 2020, João Nuno became João Eusébio's assistant at Leixões. He left the following 1 January, after being named in charge of Fabril Barreiro in the third division.

Sacked by Fabril on 22 February 2023, João Nuno was named at the helm of Liga 3 side 1º Dezembro on 2 November of that year. He left the latter on 28 January 2025, and was announced at fellow league team Belenenses just hours later.

On 28 September 2025, Primeira Liga side Estrela da Amadora announced João Nuno as their new manager, after the club paid a € 175,000 transfer fee plus 50,000 on variables. He departed the club in April 2026.
