= Mohamed Ali Diadié =

Mauritanian footballer (born 2004)

Personal information
- Date of birth: 22 October 2004 (age 22)
- Place of birth: France
- Height: 1.89 m (6 ft 2 in)
- Position: Centre-back

Team information
- Current team: Torreense
- Number: 5

Youth career
- Gagny
- –2019: SFC Neuilly-sur-Marne
- 2019–2020: Saint-Étienne
- 2020–2021: Torcy
- 2021–2022: Dunkerque
- 2022–2023: Reims

Senior career*
Years	Team	Apps	(Gls)
2023–2025	Reims B	42	(2)
2025	Reims	1	(0)
2025–	Torreense	29	(1)

International career^{‡}
2026–	Mauritania	3	(1)
- * Club domestic league appearances and goals as of 18 May 2026 ‡ National team caps and goals as of 17 November 2026

Mohamed Ali Diadié (born 22 October 2004) is a professional footballer who plays as a centre-back for Liga Portugal 2 club Torreense. Born in France, he represents the Mauritania national team.

== Career ==
Diadié joined Reims on 31 July 2023. He extended his contract with Reims on June 18, 2024. Diadié signed his first professional contract with Reims on 19 June 2025.

Diadié joined Torreense on 1 September 2025.

== Honours ==
Torreense

- Taça de Portugal: 2025–26
