= David Bruno =

Portuguese footballer

Personal information
- Full name: David Carneiro Dias de Rezende Bruno
- Date of birth: 14 February 1992 (age 34)
- Place of birth: Porto, Portugal
- Height: 1.76 m (5 ft 9 in)
- Position: Right-back

Team information
- Current team: Torreense
- Number: 22

Youth career
- 2001–2011: Porto

Senior career*
Years	Team	Apps	(Gls)
2009–2017	Porto	0	(0)
2011–2012	→ Trofense (loan)	23	(1)
2012–2015	Porto B	80	(1)
2015–2016	→ Freamunde (loan)	39	(0)
2016–2017	→ Tondela (loan)	20	(0)
2017–2019	Tondela	54	(1)
2019–2021	Astra Giurgiu	52	(0)
2021–2022	Estoril	20	(0)
2022–2023	Moreirense	31	(1)
2023–2024	Santa Clara	2	(0)
2024–2025	Alverca	19	(2)
2025–	Torreense	34	(0)

International career
2009–2010	Portugal U18	7	(0)
2010–2011	Portugal U19	12	(0)
2012	Portugal U20	2	(0)
2012–2013	Portugal U21	4	(0)
- * Club domestic league appearances and goals as of 21:31, 3 September 2026 (UTC)

David Carneiro Dias de Rezende Bruno (born 14 February 1992) is a Portuguese professional footballer who plays as a right-back for Liga Portugal 2 club Torreense.

== Honours ==
Moreirense

- Liga Portugal 2: 2022–23

Santa Clara

- Liga Portugal 2: 2023–24

Torreense

- Taça de Portugal: 2025–26
