= David Costa (footballer, born 2004) =

Cape Verdean footballer

Personal information
- Full name: David José Soares Oliveira Furtado Costa
- Date of birth: 12 January 2004 (age 22)
- Place of birth: Lisbon, Portugal
- Height: 1.70 m (5 ft 7 in)
- Position: Attacking midfielder

Team information
- Current team: Eyüpspor
- Number: 8

Youth career
- 2008–2009: AD Quinta da Luz
- 2009–2012: Juventude Horta Nova FC
- 2012–2017: Amavita FC
- 2017–2019: Real S.C.
- 2019–2021: Benfica
- 2021–2022: Tondela
- 2022–2023: Torreense

Senior career*
Years	Team	Apps	(Gls)
2023–2026	Torreense	35	(3)
2026	→ Paços de Ferreira (loan)	14	(4)
2026–	Eyüpspor	5	(0)

International career^{‡}
2025–	Cape Verde	1	(0)
- * Club domestic league appearances and goals as of 20 September 2026 ‡ National team caps and goals as of 17:13, 27 January 2026 (UTC)

David José Soares Oliveira Furtado Costa (Portuguese: [da.ˈvid ʒu.ˈzɛ su.ˈaˈɾɨz o.li.ˈvej.ɾɐ fuɾ.ˈta.du ˈkɔʃ.tɐ]; born 12 January 2004) is a professional footballer who plays as an attacking midfielder for Süper Lig club Eyüpspor in Turkey. Born in Portugal, he plays for the Cape Verde national team.

== Club career ==
Costa is a product of the youth academies of AD Quinta da Luz, Juventude Horta Nova FC, Amavita FC, Real S.C., Benfica, Tondela and Torreense. Debuting with Torreense in the Liga Portugal 2 in 2023, he signed a professional contract with the club on 1 August 2024 until 2027.

On 27 January 2026, Costa was sent on a six-month loan to fellow Liga Portugal 2 side Paços de Ferreira, with an optional buy-option.

== International career ==
Born in Portugal, Costa is of Cape Verdean descent. He was called up to the Cape Verde national team for a set of friendlies in May 2025.
