= Musa Drammeh =

Spanish footballer (born 2001)

Personal information
- Full name: Musa Drammeh Jaiteh
- Date of birth: 26 November 2001 (age 24)
- Place of birth: Mataró, Spain
- Height: 6 ft 2 in (1.88 m)
- Positions: Right midfielder; right winger

Team information
- Current team: Torreense
- Number: 17

Youth career
- –2020: Mataró

Senior career*
Years	Team	Apps	(Gls)
2020–2021	Extremadura	11	(1)
2020–2021	→ Extremadura B	27	(6)
2022–2024	Sevilla Atlético	63	(11)
2024–2025	Heart of Midlothian	22	(3)
2025–	Torreense	28	(8)
- * Club domestic league appearances and goals as of 18 May 2026

Musa Drammeh (born 26 November 2001) is a Spanish professional footballer who plays as a right midfielder or right winger for Liga Portugal 2 club Torrense. He has previously played for Sevilla Atlético, Extremadura, CE Mataró and Heart of Midlothian.

== Career ==
=== Sevilla Atlético ===
In January 2022, Drammeh signed for Spanish side Sevilla Atlético – the reserve team of Sevilla FC. He was regarded as one of the club's most important players.

In the 2023–24 season he scored 10 goals in 32 appearances, helping the club to finish as champions of the Segunda Federación and earning promotion to the Spanish third tier.

=== Heart of Midlothian ===
On 24 June 2024, Drammeh signed a three-year-contract with Scottish Premiership club Heart of Midlothian after the expiration of his contract with Sevilla Atlético.

== Style of play ==
Drammeh mainly operates as a striker. He is known for his strength.

== Personal life ==
Drammeh was born in 2001 in the Barcelona region of Spain. He is of Gambian descent.

== Honours ==
Torreense

- Taça de Portugal: 2025–26
