= Luís Tralhão =

Portuguese football manager (born 1978)

Personal information
- Full name: Luís Miguel Valado Tralhão
- Date of birth: 19 September 1978 (age 48)
- Place of birth: Lisbon, Portugal

Managerial career
- Years: Team
- 2019–2020: Cova da Piedade (caretaker)
- 2026: Torreense

Luís Miguel Valado Tralhão (born 19 September 1978) is a Portuguese professional football manager. He won the Taça de Portugal with Torreense in 2026, the first club from outside the Primeira Liga to do so.

== Career ==
=== Early career ===
Born in Lisbon, Tralhão began his coaching career with the youth teams of Real Massamá and Benfica, joining the latter in 2007. He was assistant to his younger brother João Tralhão with Benfica under-23, and succeeded him when his brother left for Monaco in 2018. He led Benfica to fifth place in the new Liga Revelação in 2018–19.

In July 2019, Tralhão left for another under-23 team, joining Cova da Piedade. In December, first-team manager Jorge Casquilha left the club and Tralhão succeeded him at the last-placed team in Liga Portugal 2; his debut on 21 December was a goalless draw away to Leixões, and he led the Almada-based side to two defeats in January before the appointment of João Alves.

Tralhão joined Vilafranquense as an assistant manager to his brother in the 2020–21 Liga Portugal 2 before returning to Benfica's under-19 team, again as number two.

=== Torreense ===
In June 2024, Tralhão moved to Torreense as under-23 manager. On the first day of the year 2026, he was confirmed as first-team manager in the second tier, succeeding Vítor Martins. Four days later, he won 1–0 on his debut away to Vizela, before a 3–1 victory on 11 January at home to União de Leiria, eventually winning his first four games. On 24 May, his team became the seventh from outside the Primeira Liga to contest the Taça de Portugal final and the first to win it, defeating Sporting CP 2–1 in the decisive match. With a leg either side of the final, his team missed out on promotion to the top flight after coming third, losing their playoff 2–0 away to Casa Pia after a goalless draw in the first leg.

As Portugal's cup winners, Torreense competed in the UEFA Europa League in 2026–27, and won 2–1 away to Lillestrøm in Norway on their debut on 17 September; their result was praised by the prime minister of Portugal, Luís Montenegro. As Tralhão does not hold a UEFA Pro Licence, he was not permitted to speak to the media after matches. With the team in 13th place after 12 games of the domestic season, his contract was terminated by mutual consent on 29 October 2026.

== Honours ==
Torreense

- Taça de Portugal: 2025–26
