= A.D. Machico =

Portuguese sports club

- Full name: Associação Desportiva de Machico
- Nicknames: Os Tricolores; Os Manitos
- Founded: April 14, 1969
- Ground: Estádio Municipal de Machico, Machico, Madeira
- Capacity: 3,300
- Chairman: (Portugal) José Manuel Alves Belo
- Manager: (Portugal) Luís Pestana
- League: Campeonato de Portugal
Home colours	Away colours

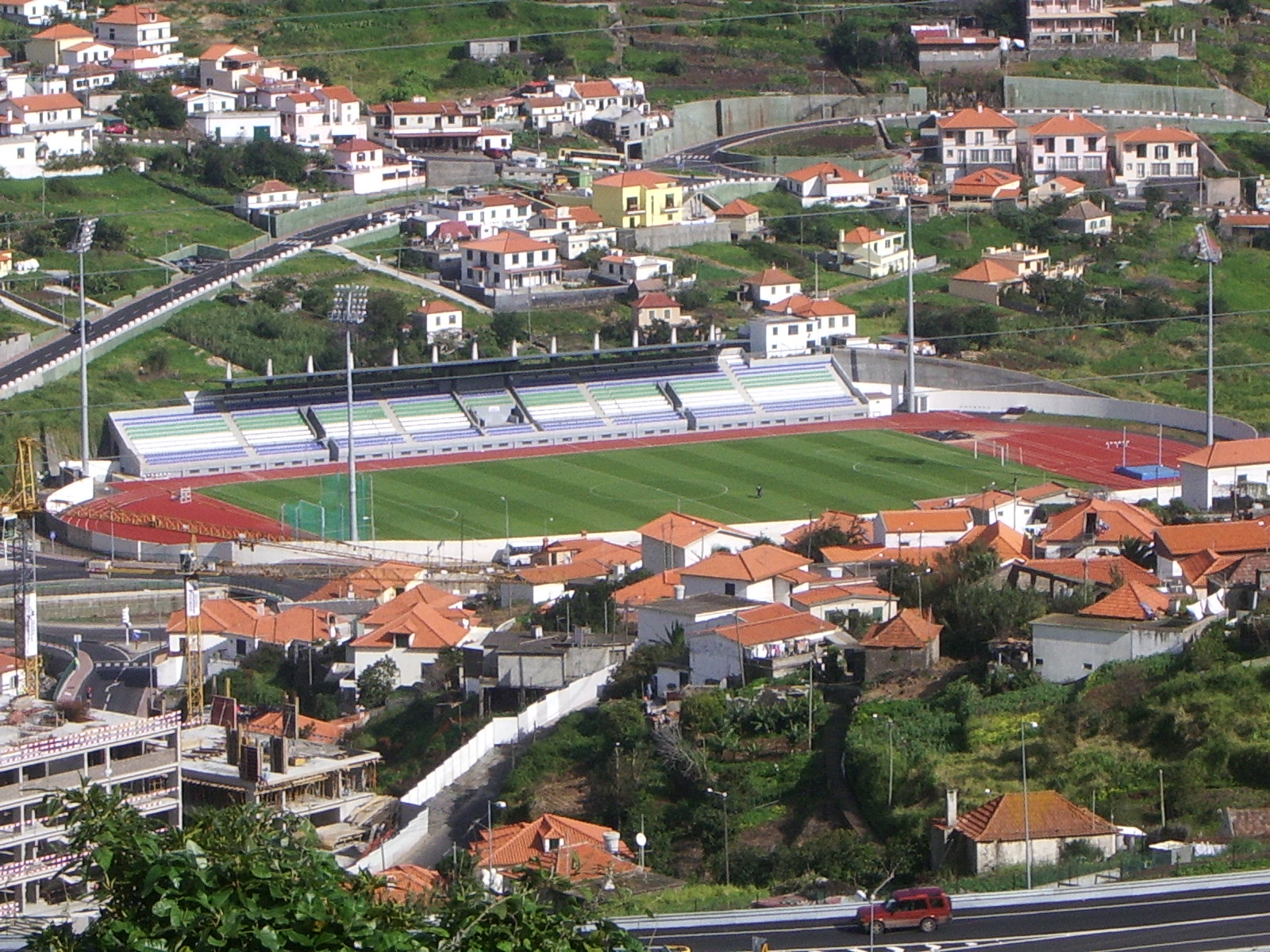
Estádio Municipal de Machico

Associação Desportiva de Machico, or simply Machico, is a sports club based in the city of Machico, on the Portuguese island of Madeira. They are notable mainly for their football teams. They also compete in volleyball, swimming, boccia, and futsal.

The men's senior association football team competes in the Regional Honor Division. The team competed in the 2022/23 Portuguese Championship, returning to national football after more than a decade away.

The club formed on April 14, 1969 when Os Belenenses and Sporting Clube de Machico merged. The first president was António Vieira and the club had 500 members. Multiple sports were added to the club: volleyball (1976), handball (1978), table tennis and skating (1981), sailing (1989) and basketball (1989). It also had a karate team at one point. A footvolley team competed in the regional championships in 2022 and 2023.

In the 1980s, the volleyball team was a strong regional and national competitor. The senior team reached the top national division.

Machico Stadium was constructed in 1997 and seats 3,300 people. The team also uses Tristão Vaz Municipal Field, Machico Pavilion, and the Machico Swimming Pool.

In addition to the senior team, the club has youth football teams for ages 5 to 18 years old. They compete up to the junior level. All teams are for men or boys. The club focuses on youth football. They are one of the few clubs recognized as a Certified Football Training Entity by the Portuguese Football Federation.

== Notable players ==
- (Portugal) Costinha
- (Angola) Fua
- (Portugal) Marco Paiva

== Honours ==
=== Association football ===
- AF Madeira Championship: 3
  - 1975–76, 1989–90, 2023–24
- AF Madeira Cup: 3
  - 1972–73, 1998–99, 2021

=== Boccia ===
- Madeira Cup and Championship BC2 category

=== Volleyball ===
- Men's National Champions Division I
  - 1999-00
- Youth National Champions Female
  - 1992-93
- Initiate National Champions Female
  - 1984-85, 1985-86
- National Minis Meeting
  - 2019

== See also ==
- A.D. Machico (volleyball)
