= Estádio Manuel Marques =

Stadium in Torres Vedras, Portugal

- Interactive map of Estádio Manuel Marques
- Full name: Estádio Manuel Marques
- Former names: Campo das Covas (1926-1969)
- Location: Torres Vedras, Portugal
- Coordinates: 39°05′42″N 9°15′24″W
- Owner: Municipality of Torres Vedras
- Capacity: 2,431
- Surface: Grass

Construction
- Opened: 1926

Tenant
- SCU Torreense

Estádio Manuel Marques, commonly still known as Campo Manuel Marques (Note: The prefix Estádio Municipal is also alternatively used. Historically, the ground has also used the prefix Parque de Jogos, as seen by a plaque outside the stadium.), is a multi-use stadium in Torres Vedras, Portugal, currently used mostly for football matches as the home stadium of SCU Torreense. Inaugurated in 1926, the stadium's current structure once had a capacity for 12,000 people on foot. However, due to Liga Portugal regulations, the capacity was reduced to 2,431 spectators after the standing areas were closed off and additional installation of chairs for safety and comfort reasons took place.

In 2021, the stadium became the centre-piece of a larger sporting complex of the same name. Since 2023, recognising the age of the infrastructure, Torreense has been studying ways to renovate and expand the stadium in the club's aspiration to play at home in their project to achieve promotion to the first division.
