= 2025–26 Taça de Portugal =

Taça de Portugal Generali Tranquilidade

Tournament details
- Country: Portugal
- Dates: 30 August 2025 – 24 May 2026
- Teams: 149

Final positions
- Champions: Torreense (1st title)
- Runners-up: Sporting CP

The 2025–26 Taça de Portugal (also known as Taça de Portugal Generali Tranquilidade for sponsorship reasons) was the 86th edition of the Taça de Portugal, the premier knockout competition in Portuguese football. The competition was contested by a total of 149 teams (excluding reserve or B teams) representing the top four national levels of the Portuguese football league system and the fifth-level district leagues and cups. The tournament began on 30 August 2025 with the first round, involving teams from the third, fourth and fifth tiers, and concluded with the final at the Estádio Nacional in Oeiras on 24 May 2026. Top-tier Primeira Liga teams entered the competition in the third round.

Primeira Liga side Sporting CP were the defending champions. They reached the final for a third consecutive season but were defeated 2–1 after extra-time by Liga Portugal 2 side Torreense. In doing so, Torreense won their first-ever title in the competition and their first major trophy in the club's history, becoming also the first second-tier club to achieve this feat. As cup winners, Torreense qualified for the 2026–27 UEFA Europa League league stage – their first-ever participation in European competition.

== Format ==
Round	Clubs remaining	Clubs involved	Winners from previous round	New entries this round	Leagues entering at this round (tier)
First round	149	116	none	116	Liga 3 (3rd): 18 teams Campeonato de Portugal (4th): 54 teams District Football Associations (5th): 44 teams
Second round	108	92	39+38	15	Liga Portugal 2 (2nd): 15 teams
Third round	64	64	46	18	Primeira Liga (1st): 18 teams
Fourth round	32	32	32	none	none
Fifth round	16	16	16	none	none
Quarter-finals	8	8	8	none	none
Semi-finals	4	4	4	none	none
Final	2	2	2	none	none

== Teams ==
A total of 149 teams competed in the 2025–26 edition, comprising 18 teams from the Primeira Liga (tier 1), 15 teams from the Liga Portugal 2 (tier 2), 18 teams from the Liga 3 (tier 3), 54 teams from the Campeonato de Portugal (tier 4) and 44 teams from the District championships and cups (tier 5).

=== Primeira Liga ===
- Alverca
- Arouca
- AVS
- Benfica
- Braga
- Casa Pia
- Estoril
- Estrela da Amadora
- Famalicão
- Gil Vicente
- Moreirense
- Nacional
- Porto
- Rio Ave
- Santa Clara
- Sporting CP
- Tondela
- Vitória de Guimarães

=== Liga Portugal 2 ===
- Académico de Viseu
- Chaves
- Farense
- Feirense
- Felgueiras
- Leixões
- Lusitânia Lourosa
- Marítimo
- Oliveirense
- Paços de Ferreira
- Penafiel
- Portimonense
- Tondela
- Torreense
- União de Leiria
- Vizela

=== Liga 3 ===
Série A

- Amarante
- Fafe
- Marco 09
- Paredes
- Sanjoanense
- São João de Ver
- Trofense
- Varzim

Série B

- 1º Dezembro
- Académica
- Amora
- Atlético CP
- Belenenses
- Caldas
- Lusitano Évora
- Mafra
- Sp. Covilhã
- União de Santarém

=== Campeonato de Portugal ===
Série A

Série B

Série C

Série D

=== District Championships ===
Algarve FA

Angra do Heroísmo FA

Aveiro FA

Beja FA

Braga FA

Bragança FA

Castelo Branco FA

Coimbra FA

Évora FA

Guarda FA

Horta FA

Leiria FA

Lisbon FA

Madeira FA

Ponta Delgada FA

Portalegre FA

Porto FA

Santarém FA

Setúbal FA

Viana do Castelo FA

Vila Real FA

Viseu FA

== First round ==
The draw for the first round was held on 8 August 2025. It featured a total of 116 teams, including 18 representatives from the Liga 3 (third level), 54 from the Campeonato de Portugal (fourth level) and 44 from the District Championships (fifth level). Thirty-eight teams were drawn a bye to the second round, leaving 78 teams to contest the first round. These teams were grouped according to geographical criteria into seven series of 10 teams and one series of eight teams.

Matches were played mostly on 30–31 August 2025. The 39 winners advanced to the second round.

Number of teams per tier entering this round
Primeira Liga (1)	Liga Portugal 2 (2)	Liga 3 (3)	Campeonato de Portugal (4)	District Championships (5)	Total
0 / 18	0 / 15	18 / 18	54 / 54	44 / 44	116 / 149

Team 1	Score	Team 2
7 September 2025
Lusitano Évora (4)	7–0	Culatrense (5)
Beira-Mar (4)	3–0	Valecambrense (5)
Salgueiros (4)	2–0	Coimbrões (5)
U. Santarém (4)	4–1	Peniche (4)
Marinhense (4)	2–0	Cartaxo (5)
Vilafranquense (5)	1–0	Loures (4)
Esperança Lagos (4)	1–2	Barreirense (4)
Bragança (4)	3–1	Macedo Cavaleiros (5)
Sintrense (4)	5–0	Estremoz (5)
Régua (5)	0–2	Marco 09 (4)
O Elvas (4)	2–1	Alcacerense (5)
Arrifanense (5)	1–0	Cesarense (5)
Vianense (4)	4–0	Valdevez (5)
Juventude Évora (4)	0–1	Serpa (4)
Olhanense (5)	2–0	Almancilense (5)
Praiense (5)	3–2 (a.e.t.)	Rabo de Peixe (4)
Lusitânia Lourosa (4)	6–0	Nogueirense (5)

== Second round ==
The draw for the second round was held simultaneously with the first round on 8 August 2025. It featured a total of 92 teams, including the 15 (non-reserve/B team) representatives from the Liga Portugal 2 (second level), the 39 winners of the first round (unknown at the time of the draw) and the 38 teams given a bye to the second round. The only condition of this draw was that all second-tier teams must play their matches away.

Matches were played on 19–21 September 2025. The 46 winners advanced to the third round.

Number of teams per tier entering this round
Primeira Liga (1)	Liga Portugal 2 (2)	Liga 3 (3)	Campeonato de Portugal (4)	District Championships (5)	Total
0 / 18	15 / 15	18 / 18	36 / 54	17 / 44	92 / 149

Team 1	Score	Team 2
20 September 2025
Beira-Mar (4)	1–0	Feirense (2)
Anadia (4)	1–2	Belenenses (3)
Camacha (4)	0–2	União de Leiria (2)
21 September 2025
Pevidém (4)	2–1	Marítimo (2)
Lusitano Évora (4)	1–1 (3–2 p)	Académico Viseu (2)
Vianense (4)	1–3	Portimonense (2)
Varzim (3)	2–1	Paços de Ferreira (2)
1º Dezembro (3)	2–0	Oliveirense (2)
Tirsense (4)	1–2	Torreense (2)
Atlético CP (3)	1–0	Vizela (2)
Alcains (4)	0–1	Chaves (2)
Salgueiros (4)	1–2	Tondela (2)
Sp. Covilhã (3)	2–0	Águeda (5)
Sintrense (4)	1–0	Trofense (3)
Lusitânia Lourosa (3)	4–0	Machico (4)
O Elvas (4)	1–2 (a.e.t.)	Felgueiras (2)
Amora (4)	3–0	Arrifanense (5)
Praiense (5)	0–1	Sanjoanense (3)

== Third round ==
The draw for the third round was held on 25 September 2025. It featured a total of 64 teams, including the 18 representatives from the Primeira Liga (first level) and the 46 winners of the second round. The only condition of this draw was that all first-tier teams must play their matches away.

Matches were played on 17–19 October 2025. The 32 winners advanced to the fourth round.

Number of teams per tier entering this round
Primeira Liga (1)	Liga Portugal 2 (2)	Liga 3 (3)	Campeonato de Portugal (4)	District Championships (5)	Total
18 / 18	11 / 15	10 / 18	17 / 54	8 / 44	64 / 149

Team 1	Score	Team 2
17 October 2025
Chaves (2)	0–2	Benfica (1)
18 October 2025
São João de Ver (3)	0–3	Famalicão (1)
Espinho (5)	0–0 (2–4 p)	Santa Clara (1)
Fornos de Algodres (5)	0–7	AFS (1)
União de Leiria (2)	2–2 (4–2 p)	Alverca (1)
Torreense (2)	1–1 (5–4 p)	Oliveirense (2)
Rebordosa (5)	1–3	Nacional (1)
Alpendorada (4)	3–1	Estrela da Amadora (1)
Sp. Covilhã (3)	1–0	União Nogueirense (5)
Bragança (4)	0–1	Braga (1)
Portimonense (2)	1–2	Arouca (1)
Celoricense (4)	0–4	FC Porto (1)
Académico Viseu (2)	2–1	Gil Vicente (1)
Marco 09 (3)	0–7	Farense (2)
Paços de Ferreira (2)	2–3 (a.e.t.)	Sporting CP (1)
19 October 2025
Fafe (3)	1–0	Moreirense (1)
Lusitânia Lourosa (2)	2–0	Resende (4)
1º Dezembro (3)	1–1 (5–4 p)	Benfica Castelo Branco (4)
União de Lamas (4)	0–1	Vitória de Guimarães (1)
Atlético CP (3)	2–0	Felgueiras (2)
Vila Real (4)	1–5	Tondela (1)
Silves (5)	2–1 (a.e.t.)	Louletano (4)
Comércio e Indústria (4)	3–0	Vianense (4)
Ançã (5)	0–7	Casa Pia (1)
Lusitano Évora (3)	4–1	Olivais e Moscavide (5)
Anadia (4)	0–0 (6–7 p)	Marinhense (4)
Caldas (3)	1–0	Mirandela (4)
Sintrense (4)	3–2	Rio Ave (1)
Mortágua (4)	2–0	Portimonense II (4)
Amarante (3)	1–2 (a.e.t.)	Leixões (2)
Vila Meã (4)	1–0	Vila Caiz (5)
Belenenses (3)	1–2	Estoril (1)

== Fourth round ==
The draw for the third round was held simultaneously with the third round on 25 September 2025. The 32 future winners of the third round matches were paired without any conditions.

Number of teams per tier entering this round
Primeira Liga (1)	Liga Portugal 2 (2)	Liga 3 (3)	Campeonato de Portugal (4)	District Championships (5)	Total
13 / 18	6 / 15	6 / 18	6 / 54	1 / 44	32 / 149

Matches were played on 21–23 November 2025. The 16 winners advanced to the fifth round.

Team 1	Score	Team 2
21 November 2025
Atlético CP (3)	0–2	Benfica (1)
22 November 2025
AFS (1)	0–0 (7–6 p)	Académico Viseu (2)
Alpendorada (4)	0–3	Casa Pia (1)
Vitória de Guimarães (1)	4–0	Mortágua (4)
Sp. Covilhã (3)	0–2	Lusitano Évora (3)
1º Dezembro (3)	1–3	União de Leiria (2)
Estoril (1)	1–2	Famalicão (1)
Sporting CP (1)	3–0	Marinhense (4)
FC Porto (1)	3–0	Sintrense (4)
23 November 2025
Lusitânia Lourosa (2)	0–1	Torreense (2)
Vila Meã (4)	2–1 (a.e.t.)	Leixões (2)
Fafe (3)	2–1	Arouca (1)
Farense (2)	5–1	Silves (5)
Santa Clara (1)	3–0	Comércio e Indústria (4)
Tondela (1)	0–0 (5–6 p)	Caldas (3)
Braga (1)	4–2	Nacional (1)

== Fifth round ==
The draw for the fifth round was held on 25 November 2025. The 16 winners of the fourth round were paired without any conditions.

Number of teams per tier entering this round
Primeira Liga (1)	Liga Portugal 2 (2)	Liga 3 (3)	Campeonato de Portugal (4)	District Championships (5)	Total
9 / 18	3 / 15	3 / 18	1 / 54	0 / 44	16 / 149

Matches were played on 17–18, 23 and 27 December 2025. The eight winners advanced to the quarter-finals.

Team 1	Score	Team 2
17 December 2025
Vitória de Guimarães (1)	0–1	AFS (1)
Vila Meã (4)	0–1	União de Leiria (2)
Farense (2)	0–2	Benfica (1)
Casa Pia (1)	1–2	Torreense (2)
18 December 2025
Santa Clara (1)	2–3 (a.e.t.)	Sporting CP (1)
FC Porto (1)	4–1	Famalicão (1)
23 December 2025
Caldas (3)	0–3	Braga (1)
27 December 2025
Lusitano Évora (3)	0–1	Fafe (3)

== Quarter-finals ==
The draw for the quarter-finals was held simultaneously with the fifth round on 25 November 2025. The eight future winners of the fifth round were paired without any conditions.

Number of teams per tier entering this round
Primeira Liga (1)	Liga Portugal 2 (2)	Liga 3 (3)	Campeonato de Portugal (4)	District Championships (5)	Total
5 / 18	2 / 15	1 / 18	0 / 54	0 / 44	8 / 149

Matches were played on 11 and 14 January and 5 February 2026. The four winners advanced to the semi-finals.

11 January 2026	Torreense (2)	3–1	União de Leiria (2)	Torres Vedras
20:15 WET (UTC±0)	Zohi 11', 49'; Drammeh 90+1'	Report	Fernández 41'	Stadium: Estádio Manuel Marques; Referee: Iancu Vasilica

14 January 2026	Fafe (3)	2–1	Braga (1)	Fafe
18:45 WET (UTC±0)	João Santos 42'; Silva 70'	Report	Dorgeles 90+5'	Stadium: Estádio Municipal de Fafe; Referee: Bruno José Costa

14 January 2026	Porto (1)	1–0	Benfica (1)	Porto
20:45 WET (UTC±0)	Bednarek 15'	Report		Stadium: Estádio do Dragão; Attendance: 47,374; Referee: Fábio Veríssimo

5 February 2026	Sporting CP (1)	3–2 (a.e.t.)	AVS (1)	Lisbon
20:45 WET (UTC±00:00)	Luis Guilherme 29'; Paulo Vitor 49' (o.g.); Catamo 117'	Report	Lima 63' (pen.); Nenê 90+2' (pen.)	Stadium: Estádio José Alvalade; Attendance: 21,454; Referee: André Narciso

== Semi-finals ==
The draw for the semi-finals was held on 15 January 2026. The four winners of the quarter-finals were paired without any conditions. Each pairing was contested in two home-and-away matches.

Number of teams per tier entering this round
Primeira Liga (1)	Liga Portugal 2 (2)	Liga 3 (3)	Campeonato de Portugal (4)	District Championships (5)	Total
2 / 18	1 / 15	1 / 18	0 / 54	0 / 44	4 / 149

The first-leg matches were played on 4 February and 3 March, and the second-leg matches were played on 22–23 April 2026. The two winners on aggregate advanced to the final.

4 February 2026
20:15 WET (UTC±0)

Fafe (3)	1–1	Torreense (2)
Oliveira 43'	Report	Pozo 59'

Estádio Municipal de Fafe, Fafe
Attendance: 3,112
Referee: Miguel Bertolo Nogueira
23 April 2026
20:45 WEST (UTC+1)

Torreense (2)	2–0	Fafe (3)
Bruno 84'; Stopira 90+13' (pen.)	Report

Estádio Manuel Marques, Torres Vedras
Attendance: 4,084
Referee: Gustavo Correia

Torreense won 3–1 on aggregate.

3 March 2026
20:45 WET (UTC±00:00)

Sporting CP (1)	1–0	Porto (1)
Suárez 62' (pen.)	Report

Estádio José Alvalade, Lisbon
Attendance: 52,095
Referee: Cláudio Pereira
22 April 2026
20:45 WEST (UTC+01:00)

Porto (1)	0–0	Sporting CP (1)
	Report

Estádio do Dragão, Porto
Attendance: 47,750
Referee: Miguel Nogueira

Sporting CP won 1–0 on aggregate.

== Final ==
Number of teams per tier entering this round
Primeira Liga (1)	Liga Portugal 2 (2)	Liga 3 (3)	Campeonato de Portugal (4)	District Championships (5)	Total
1 / 18	1 / 15	0 / 18	0 / 54	0 / 44	2 / 149

24 May 2026
17:15 WEST (UTC+01:00)

Sporting CP	1–2 (a.e.t.)	Torreense
Suárez 54'	Report	Zohi 4'; Stopira 113' (pen.)

Estádio Nacional, Oeiras
Attendance: 35,000
Referee: António Nobre
