= S.C.U. Torreense =

Association football club in Portugal

Torreense
- Full name: Sport Clube União Torreense
- Nickname: Azul-grenás (Blue-garnets)
- Short name: Torreense; SCUT
- Founded: 1 May 1917; 109 years ago as Sport União Torreense
- Stadium: Estádio Manuel Marques
- Capacity: 2,431
- President: José Sebastião
- Head coach: João Nuno
- League: Liga Portugal 2
- 2025–26: Liga Portugal 2, 3rd of 18
- Website: torreense.com
Home colours	Away colours	Third colours

Sport Clube União Torreense ([toˈʁiẽsɨ], lit. 'Sport Club Union of Torres'), simply known as Torreense or SCUT is a Portuguese sports club, best known for its association football section. Founded in 1917 in Torres Vedras as Sport União Torreense, the club currently plays in Liga Portugal 2, the second tier of Portuguese football.

== History ==
It participated six times in the Portuguese Liga (last in 1991–92 season) and its best result was two seventh final places (1955–56 and 1956–57), coincidentally the team's first two years in the top flight. Torreense participated twice in the final of the Taça de Portugal: in 1956, where they lost 2–0 to FC Porto, and in 2026, which they won 2-1 against Sporting CP, this victory was the first time in Portuguese football that a club playing in the Portuguese Second Division won the Taça de Portugal.

They also played in Portuguese Second Division (second level) between 1952 and 1955, 1959 to 1964, 1965 to 1972, 1973 to 1977, 1978 to 1981, 1982 to 1991, 1992 to 1995, 1997 to 1998 and 2022 to present.

In the 2008–09 season, they were relegated from Group D of Portuguese Second Division. In the 2009–10 season, they finished Promotion Group E of Terceira Divisão on second place and in 2010–11 they returned to the Portuguese Second Division, finishing it in third place and as in 2021–22 they got promotion to Liga Portugal 2 after winning the new league called 2021–22 Liga 3.

On 24 May 2026, Torreense defeated Sporting CP 2–1 in the Taça de Portugal final, winning a major domestic honour for the first time in the club's history and securing qualification for the UEFA Europa League as the first non-top flight club to qualify for the revised league phase and the third non-top flight Portuguese club to qualify for the UEFA Europa League after Beira-Mar and Leixões. In the meantime, Torreense lost 2–0 on aggregate to Casa Pia in the promotion play-offs, remaining in Liga Portugal 2.

On 17 September 2026, Torreense defeated Norwegian side Lillestrom 2–1 in UEFA Europa League, winning on their European debut in any competition.

== Stadium ==
Its stadium was built in 1925 and has a capacity of 2,431 people.

For the 2026–27 UEFA Europa League, Torreense will use the Estádio Dr. Magalhães Pessoa in Leiria as their home stadium.

== Players ==
=== Current squad ===
As of 17 September 2026

Note: Flags indicate national team as defined under FIFA eligibility rules; some limited exceptions apply. Players may hold more than one non-FIFA nationality.

No.	Pos.	Nation	Player
1	GK	BRA	Lucas Paes
2	DF	CPV	Stopira (captain)
3	DF	ESP	Juan María Alcedo
4	DF	BRA	Volnei
5	DF	MTN	Mohamed Ali Diadié
6	MF	MAR	Amine Oudrhiri
7	FW	HAI	Dany Jean
8	MF	ESP	Álex Alfaro
10	MF	POR	Costinha
11	FW	ESP	Manu Pozo
14	FW	CUB	Jorge Aguirre
16	GK	FRA	Lisandru Olmeta
17	FW	ESP	Musa Drammeh
19	FW	ISR	Karem Zoabi
20	MF	ESP	Carlos Reina
21	MF	GER	Nuha Jatta

No.	Pos.	Nation	Player
22	DF	POR	David Bruno
23	DF	ESP	Javi Vázquez
24	MF	FRA	Patrick Injai
25	DF	CGO	Jérémy Mounsesse
26	MF	POR	André Simões
27	FW	GHA	Malik Abubakari
28	DF	ESP	Hugo Pérez
29	FW	COL	Luis Quintero
31	GK	BRA	Adriel
33	FW	POR	João Marques (on loan from Braga)
45	DF	FRA	Jonathan Mutombo
46	DF	CMR	Brian Agbor
47	FW	FRA	Adama Baradji
57	DF	BRA	Danilo
77	MF	COL	Joel Romero (on loan from América de Cali)
90	FW	GBS	Vando Félix

=== Reserve squad ===
Note: Flags indicate national team as defined under FIFA eligibility rules; some limited exceptions apply. Players may hold more than one non-FIFA nationality.

No.	Pos.	Nation	Player
13	GK	ESP	Unai Pérez
44	GK	DEN	Silas Bjerre

No.	Pos.	Nation	Player
55	MF	BRA	Zé Breno
98	FW	GAB	Bryan Meyo

=== Out on loan ===
Note: Flags indicate national team as defined under FIFA eligibility rules; some limited exceptions apply. Players may hold more than one non-FIFA nationality.

No.	Pos.	Nation	Player
9	FW	CIV	Kévin Zohi (at Coimbra until 30 June 2027)
30	FW	ITA	Bob Omoregbe (at Pontevedra until 30 June 2027)

== Notable players ==
- (Angola) Fua
- (Angola) Rúben Gouveia
- (Angola) Mateus
- (Angola) Bruno Mauro
- (Angola) Vata
- (Bulgaria) Vasil Dragolov
- (Canada) Stephen Eustáquio
- (Central African Republic) Josias Sabone
- (Comoros) Aboubacar Ali Abdallah
- (Cape Verde) Fábio Arcanjo
- (Cape Verde) Brito
- (Cape Verde) David Costa
- (Cape Verde) Patrick Fernandes
- (Cape Verde) Yuran Fernandes
- (Cape Verde) Rodrigo Lima
- (Cape Verde) Janício Martins
- (Cape Verde) Paulo Pina
- (Cape Verde) Stopira
- (Cape Verde) Aílson Tavares
- (Cape Verde) David Tavares
- (Cape Verde) Tom Tavares
- (Cuba) Jorge Aguirre
- (Cyprus) Renato Margaça
- (Gabon) Bryan Meyo
- (Guinea-Bissau) Leonel Alves
- (Guinea-Bissau) Ibraima Baldé
- (Guinea-Bissau) Umaro Baldé
- (Guinea-Bissau) Carlos Califo
- (Guinea-Bissau) Vando Félix
- (Guinea-Bissau) Niche
- (Guinea-Bissau) Igor Sani
- (Guinea-Bissau) Flávio Silva
- (Guinea-Bissau) Ibraima Só
- (Haiti) Carnejy Antoine
- (Haiti) Dany Jean
- (Israel) Miguel Vítor (youth)
- (Jamaica) Altimont Butler
- (Macau) Vítor Almeida
- (Mali) Mamadou Traoré
- (Mali) Kévin Zohi
- (Mozambique) Ricardo Campos
- (Mozambique) Pepo Santos
- (Panama) Azarias Londoño
- (Portugal) Félix Antunes
- (Portugal) Dito
- (Portugal) Edinho
- (Portugal) Pedro Espinha
- (Portugal) Fernando Gonçalves
- (Portugal) João Morais
- (Portugal) Nélson Pereira
- (Portugal) Filipe Ramos
- (Portugal) Paulo Torres
- (São Tomé and Príncipe) Harramiz
- (São Tomé and Príncipe) Orlando Monteiro
- (São Tomé and Príncipe) Zé Carlos Semedo

== Coaches ==
Below is a list of the full history of coaches who have been in charge of Torreense's senior squad:

- Eight different Technical councils (Apr 1929 - Dec 1940)
- (Portugal) Rogério de Sousa (player-coach, Dec 1940 - Oct 1941)
- Technical council (Sep 1941 - Oct 1942)
- (Portugal) José Pedro Lopes ("technical councillor", Oct 1942 - Oct 1943)
- (Portugal) Professor Tavares Júnior (Oct 1943 - Jan 1945)
- Technical council (Jan 1945 - Jan 1946)
- Technical council (Jan 1946 - Mar 1947)
- (Portugal) Pedro Pireza (Mar - Sep 1947)
- (Portugal) Rodolfo Faroleiro (Sep 1947 - Feb 1949)
- (Portugal) Evaristo Silva (interim, Feb - Jun 1949)
- (Portugal) Rafael Correia (Jul 1949 - Oct 1950)
- (Portugal) César Ferreira (Nov 1950 - May 1951)
- (Hungary) Desiderio Hertzka [pt] (Jun 1951 - Jan 1952)
- (Portugal) José Mota (Jan 1952 - Abr 1953)
- (Argentina) Anselmo Pisa (Apr 1953 - Jul 1954)
- (Argentina) Óscar Tellechea [fr] (Jul 1955 - Jul 1956)
- (Portugal) Cândido Tavares (Sep 1956 - Jul 1957)
- (Spain) Marcial Camiaruaga (Aug 1957 - Jun 1958)
- (Hungary) Joseph Tarkani (Sep - Dec 1958)
- (Portugal) Evaristo Silva (Jan - Jun 1959)
- (Portugal) Armando Carneiro (Jul 1959 - Jan 1960)
- (Portugal) Mariano Amaro (Jan - Jul 1960)
- (Argentina) Ricardo Pérez (player-coach, Aug 1960 - Jul 1961)
- (Hungary) János Hrotkó (Aug 1961 - Jul 1962)
- (Portugal) Evaristo Silva (Jun 1962 - Jun 1963)
- (Hungary) János Zörgő [cs] (Jul 1963 - Jul 1964)
- (Portugal) Tavares Pereira (Jun 1965 - Jul 1966)
- (N/A) José Saura (Jun 1966 - Jun 1967)
- (Hungary) János Zörgő [cs] (Jul 1967 - Jul 1968)
- (Portugal) José Gonçalves (Aug 1968 - Jun 1969)
- (Portugal) Mário Varatojo (Jul 1969 - Jun 1971)
- (Portugal) José Gonçalves (Jul 1971 - Jan 1972)
- (Portugal) Rodrigues Dias (Feb - Jul 1972)
- (Argentina) Américo Belén (Aug 1972 - Jun 1973)
- (Portugal) Francisco Polido (Jul 1973 - Jul 1974)
- (Portugal) Professor Rui Silva (Jul 1974 - Jul 1975)
- (Portugal) Mário Varatojo (Aug 1975 - Jul 1976)
- Alternating leadership:(Aug 1976 - Jun 1977)
  - (Portugal) Mário Varatojo
  - (Portugal) José Júlio Carimbo
  - (Portugal) "Ninéu" - Vítor Sobreiro
- (Portugal) "Vieirinha" - Manuel Vieira (Jul 1978 - Mar 1979)
- (Portugal) João Flores (Mar - Dec 1979)
- (Portugal) João Garrido (Jan - Mar 1980)
- (Portugal) Fernando Vaz (Mar - Jul 1980)
- (N/A) Alberto Sachs (Aug - Dec 1980)
- (Portugal) Júlio Amador (Jan 1981 - Mar 1982)
- (Spain) Miguel Bertral (Mar - Jul 1982)
- (Portugal) Jesualdo Ferreira (Aug 1982 - Aug 1983)
- (Portugal) Professor José Lemos (Jul 1984 - Oct 1985)
- (Portugal) Pedro Gomes (Oct 1985 - Jul 1986)
- (Portugal) Jesualdo Ferreira (Aug 1986 - Jun 1987)
- (Portugal) José Moniz (Jul 1987 - Jul 1988)
- (Portugal) Mário Wilson (Aug 1988 - Aug 1989)
- (Portugal) José Moniz (Sep 1989 - Dec 1989)
- (Portugal) Jesualdo Ferreira (Dec 1989 - May 1990)
- (Portugal) João Barnabé (interim, May - Sep 1990)
- (Portugal) Eurico Gomes (Sep 1990 - Mar 1991)
- (Portugal) Manuel Cajuda (Apr 1990 - 1993)
- (Portugal) Rui Mâncio (1993 - Jul 1994)
- (Portugal) Edmundo Duarte (Aug - Oct 1994)
- (Portugal) "Toinha" - José António Vicente (interim, late 1994)
- (Portugal) Romeu Silva (1994 - Jun 1995)
- (Portugal) "Toinha" - José António Vicente (Jul - Nov 1995)
- (Portugal) Professor João Lourenço (Nov 1995 - Feb 1996)
- (Portugal) António Medeiros (Feb 1996 - May 1998)
- (Portugal) Álvaro Teixeira (player-coach, Jun - Oct 1998)
- (Portugal) Luís Brandão (Nov 1998 - Dec 1999)
- (Portugal) António Medeiros (Jan - Jul 2000)
- (Portugal) Carmo Pais (Oct 2000 - Jan 2001)
- (Portugal) "Toinha" - José António Vicente (Feb - Dec 2001)
- (Portugal) Luís Santos Brás (Jan - Jun 2003)
- (Portugal) José Rachão (Jul 2003-Mar 2005)
- (Portugal) João Margaça (Mar 2005 - Feb 2006)
- (Portugal) Pedro Gomes (Feb - Jun 2006)
- (Portugal) Luís Santos Brás (Jul 2006 - Feb 2007)
- (Portugal) Rui Esteves (Mar 2007 - Jan 2008)
- (Portugal) Pedro Gomes (Feb - Aug 2008)
- (Portugal) Ricardo Monsanto (Aug 2008 - May 2009)
- (Portugal) Paulo Torres (Jul 2009 – Mar 2011)
- (Brazil) Leandro Ávila (Apr - Jul 2011)
- (Portugal) Toni Pereira (Aug 2011 - Jul 2012)
- (Portugal) Rui Narciso (Jul - Sep 2012)
- (Portugal) Paulo Torres (Sep 2012 – Jun 2013)
- (Portugal) Jorge Vicente (Jul - Oct 2013)
- (Portugal) Luís Santos Brás (Nov 2013 - Jun 2014)
- (Portugal) Filipe Moreira (Sep 2014 - Mar 2016)
- (Portugal) Rui Narciso (Apr 2016 - May 2019)
- (Portugal) André Tomaz (Jul - Nov 2019)
- (Portugal) Emanuel Pinheiro (interim, Nov 2019)
- (Portugal) Quim Berto (Nov 2019 - Jan 2020)
- (Portugal) Luís Loureiro (Jan - Mar 2020)
- (Portugal) Filipe Moreira (Jul 2020 - Jun 2021)
- (Portugal) Daúto Faquirá (Jun - Nov 2021)
- (Portugal) Ricardo Ferreira (interim, Nov 2021)
- (Portugal) Nuno Manta Santos (Dec 2021 - Sep 2022)
- (Portugal) Pedro Moreira (Oct 2022 - Jun 2023)
- (Portugal) Rui Ferreira (Jul - Dec 2023)
- (Portugal) Manuel Tulipa (Dec 2023 - May 2024)
- (Portugal) Tiago Fernandes (May 2024 - May 2025)
- (Portugal) Vítor Martins (May 2025 – Jan 2026)
- (Portugal) Luís Tralhão (Jan 2026 – Oct 2026)} (Note: In Europe, assistant coach Carlos Simões was registered as head coach due to professional qualification regulations)
- (Portugal) João Nuno (Oct 2026 - present)

== Honours ==
League:

- Segunda Divisão (Tier 2): 1954–55
- Liga 3: 2021–22

Cup:

- Taça de Portugal: 2025–26

== European record ==
All results (home and away) list Torreense's goal tally first.

Colour key

Wins
Draws
Losses

SCU Torreense results in international competitions
Season	Competition	Round	Opponent	Home	Away
2026–27	UEFA Europa League	League phase	(Norway) Lillestrøm	–	2–1
2026–27	UEFA Europa League	League phase	(England) Sunderland	1–2	–
2026–27	UEFA Europa League	League phase	(Hungary) Ferencvárosi	–	1–4
2026–27	UEFA Europa League	League phase	Ararat-Armenia	3–2	–
2026–27	UEFA Europa League	League phase	(Scotland) Celtic		–
2026–27	UEFA Europa League	League phase	(Spain) Real Sociedad	–	
2026–27	UEFA Europa League	League phase	(Poland) Lech Poznań	–	
2026–27	UEFA Europa League	League phase	(Greece) Olympiacos		–
