= 2019–20 Campeonato de Portugal =

7th season of the Campeonato de Portugal football league

Campeonato de Portugal
- Season: 2019–20
- Promoted: Arouca; Vizela
- Matches: 900
- Goals: 2,351 (2.61 per match)
- Top goalscorer: Diogo Ribeiro (20 goals)
- Biggest home win: Arouca 9–0 Ginásio Figueirense (8 March 2020)
- Biggest away win: Ginásio Figueirense 0–6 Castro Daire (2 February 2020); AD Oliveirense 0–6 Vizela (1 March 2020)
- Highest scoring: Arouca 9–0 Ginásio Figueirense (8 March 2020)

The 2019–20 Campeonato de Portugal was the seventh season of Portuguese football's renovated third-tier league, since the merging of the Segunda Divisão and Terceira Divisão in 2013, the fifth season under the current Campeonato de Portugal title, and the 73rd season of recognised third-tier football in Portugal. A total of 72 teams competed in this league, which began in August 2019 and was scheduled to finish in June 2020.

On 8 April 2020, the Portuguese Football Federation (FPF) cancelled all non-professional competitions due to the COVID-19 pandemic in Portugal. The following month, on 2 May, the FPF ruled that Vizela and Arouca, the two teams with the most points in all first-stage series at the time of cancellation, were promoted to the 2020–21 LigaPro. No league winner title was awarded and no teams were relegated to the District championships.

== Format ==
The competition format consisted of two stages. In the first stage, the 72 clubs were divided in four series of 18 teams, according to geographic criteria. In each series, teams played against each other in a home-and-away double round-robin system. The two best-placed teams in each series would advance to the second stage, while the five bottom teams would be relegated to the District championships. In the second stage, the eight teams disputed a series of double-legged home-and-away play-off matches, and the two play-off finalist teams would be promoted to the 2020–21 LigaPro.

== Teams ==
Location of teams of the 2019–20 Campeonato de Portugal (Mainland).
Red: Relegated from 2018-19 LigaPro;
Blue: From Promotion Play-offs;
Yellow: From 2018–19 Campeonato de Portugal;
Green: Promoted from District Championships
Location of teams of the 2019–20 Campeonato de Portugal (Madeira).
Location of teams of the 2019–20 Campeonato de Portugal (Azores).

Relegated from the 2018–19 LigaPro:

- Arouca
- Braga B
- Vitória de Guimarães B

From the 2018–19 Campeonato de Portugal:

From Play-offs:

- Praiense
- União de Leiria
- Fafe
- Lusitânia Lourosa
- Sp. Espinho
- Vizela

From Serie A:

- S. Martinho
- Trofense
- Felgueiras
- Mirandela
- Chaves B
- Merelinense
- Montalegre
- Pedras Salgadas
- Maria da Fonte
- AD Oliveirense

From Serie C:

- Anadia
- Benfica Castelo Branco
- Sintrense
- Oliveira do Hospital
- Alverca
- Caldas
- Oleiros
- Torreense
- Fátima
- Loures
- Sertanense

From Serie B:

- Gondomar
- Águeda
- Lusitano Vildemoinhos
- Sanjoanense
- Amarante
- Coimbrões
- Marítimo B
- Paredes
- União da Madeira
- Leça
- Pedras Rubras

From Serie D:

- Real
- Oriental
- Olhanense
- Amora
- 1.º Dezembro
- Armacenenses
- Louletano
- Olímpico Montijo
- Sp. Ideal
- Pinhalnovense
- Sacavenense

Promoted from the 2018–19 District Championships:

- Algarve FA: Esperança de Lagos
- Aveiro FA: Beira-Mar
- Azores Champ.: Fontinhas
- Beja FA: Aljustrelense
- Braga FA: Berço SC
- Bragança FA: Bragança
- Castelo Branco FA: Vitória de Sernache
- Coimbra FA: Condeixa
- Évora FA: Lusitano de Évora
- Guarda FA: Ginásio Figueirense
- Leiria FA: Marinhense
- Lisboa FA: Sintra Football
- Madeira FA: Câmara de Lobos
- ~~Portalegre FA: Mosteirense~~
- Porto FA: Canelas 2010 and Valadares Gaia
- Santarém FA: União de Santarém
- Setúbal FA: Fabril Barreiro
- Viana do Castelo FA: Cerveira
- Vila Real FA: Vila Real
- Viseu FA: Castro Daire

Notes

Mosteirense, Portalegre FA District League Champions declined to be promoted. Eléctrico, Portalegre FA District League Runners-up declined as well. In this case, Valadares Gaia was invited as AF Porto District League Runner-up (AF Porto is the Football Association with most teams in national leagues) and accepted the invitation.

== Group stage ==
=== Serie A ===
Pos	Team	Pld	W	D	L	GF	GA	GD	Pts	Qualification or relegation
1	Vizela (P)	25	19	3	3	64	20	+44	60	Promotion to Segunda Liga
2	Fafe	25	16	4	5	34	18	+16	52	
3	Vitória B	25	14	6	5	52	28	+24	48	
4	Braga B	25	14	4	7	48	25	+23	46	
5	Merelinense	25	12	7	6	42	31	+11	43	
6	São Martinho	25	13	5	7	44	26	+18	41	
7	Maria da Fonte	25	10	10	5	45	29	+16	40	
8	Marítimo B	25	10	9	6	46	37	+9	39	
9	Montalegre	25	10	7	8	39	32	+7	37	
10	Berço	25	9	6	10	37	37	0	33	
11	Chaves B	25	8	7	10	44	39	+5	31	
12	Mirandela	25	8	6	11	26	33	−7	30	
13	União da Madeira	25	9	3	13	35	52	−17	30	
14	Pedras Salgadas	25	6	8	11	25	43	−18	26	
15	Cerveira	25	5	5	15	25	58	−33	20	
16	Bragança	25	3	8	14	24	36	−12	17	
17	AD Oliveirense	25	2	10	13	21	43	−22	16	
18	Câmara de Lobos	25	2	2	21	15	79	−64	8	

Source: FPF.pt
Rules for classification: 1) Points, 2) Head-to-head points, 3) Head-to-head goal difference, 4) Goal difference, 5) Matches won, 6) Goals scored
(P) Promoted

=== Serie B ===
Pos	Team	Pld	W	D	L	GF	GA	GD	Pts	Qualification or relegation
1	Arouca (P)	25	18	4	3	49	19	+30	58	Promotion to Segunda Liga
2	Lusitânia Lourosa	25	14	8	3	43	18	+25	50	
3	Sp. Espinho	25	13	9	3	44	17	+27	48	
4	Leça	25	13	7	5	41	27	+14	46	
5	Castro Daire	25	12	8	5	32	22	+10	44	
6	Sanjoanense	25	12	6	7	36	30	+6	42	
7	Felgueiras	25	12	5	8	51	37	+14	41	
8	Paredes	25	9	7	9	26	19	+7	34	
9	Canelas 2010	25	7	12	6	23	19	+4	33	
10	Amarante	25	8	9	8	31	29	+2	33	
11	Coimbrões	25	8	6	11	29	41	−12	30	
12	Trofense	25	8	6	11	24	30	−6	30	
13	Pedras Rubras	25	7	7	11	28	32	−4	28	
14	Gondomar	25	7	6	12	28	33	−5	27	
15	Lusitano Vildemoinhos	25	7	4	14	29	36	−7	25	
16	Valadares Gaia	25	7	4	14	28	47	−19	25	
17	Vila Real	25	4	3	18	20	47	−27	15	
18	Ginásio Figueirense	25	2	3	20	11	70	−59	9	

Source: FPF.pt
Rules for classification: 1) Points, 2) Head-to-head points, 3) Head-to-head goal difference, 4) Goal difference, 5) Matches won, 6) Goals scored
(P) Promoted

=== Serie C ===
Pos	Team	Pld	W	D	L	GF	GA	GD	Pts
1	Praiense	25	15	8	2	48	20	+28	53
2	Benfica Castelo Branco	25	12	6	7	35	21	+14	42
3	Anadia	25	11	8	6	26	22	+4	41
4	Sertanense	25	10	8	7	20	19	+1	38
5	Beira-Mar	25	9	10	6	34	27	+7	37
6	Fátima	25	9	10	6	35	28	+7	37
7	Caldas	25	7	14	4	31	24	+7	35
8	Condeixa	25	9	8	8	32	28	+4	35
9	Torreense	25	8	10	7	27	26	+1	34
10	Oleiros	25	7	12	6	24	20	+4	33
11	Marinhense	25	8	8	9	32	31	+1	32
12	União de Leiria	25	6	11	8	27	24	+3	29
13	Águeda	25	6	10	9	23	27	−4	28
14	Oliveira do Hospital	25	5	13	7	27	35	−8	28
15	União de Santarém	25	6	9	10	31	45	−14	27
16	Sp. Ideal	25	7	6	12	28	38	−10	27
17	Vitória de Sernache	25	4	10	11	24	37	−13	22
18	Fontinhas	25	2	7	16	17	49	−32	13

Source: FPF.pt
Rules for classification: 1) Points, 2) Head-to-head points, 3) Head-to-head goal difference, 4) Goal difference, 5) Matches won, 6) Goals scored

=== Serie D ===
Pos	Team	Pld	W	D	L	GF	GA	GD	Pts
1	Olhanense	25	17	6	2	57	19	+38	57
2	Real	25	17	6	2	58	16	+42	57
3	Alverca	25	16	5	4	48	22	+26	53
4	Louletano	25	15	6	4	40	22	+18	51
5	Sintrense	25	13	6	6	27	17	+10	45
6	Pinhalnovense	25	13	6	6	43	31	+12	45
7	Loures	25	11	9	5	35	25	+10	42
8	Oriental	25	10	8	7	30	27	+3	38
9	1º de Dezembro	25	9	3	13	27	28	−1	30
10	Amora	25	6	10	9	24	29	−5	28
11	Esperança de Lagos	25	7	7	11	26	39	−13	28
12	Os Armacenenses	25	7	6	12	33	48	−15	27
13	Olímpico Montijo	25	5	6	14	26	45	−19	21
14	Sacavenense	25	5	6	14	19	38	−19	21
15	Lusitano de Évora	25	4	8	13	30	48	−18	20
16	Fabril Barreiro	25	5	4	16	21	46	−25	19
17	Aljustrelense	25	4	6	15	27	52	−25	18
18	Sintra Football	25	2	10	13	20	39	−19	16

Source: FPF.pt
Rules for classification: 1) Points, 2) Head-to-head points, 3) Head-to-head goal difference, 4) Goal difference, 5) Matches won, 6) Goals scored
