= 2021–22 Campeonato de Portugal =

9th season of the Campeonato de Portugal football league

Campeonato de Portugal
- Season: 2021–22
- Champions: Paredes
- Promoted: Belenenses; Fontinhas; Moncarapachense; Paredes; Länk Vilaverdense
- Relegated: Alvarenga; Barreirense; Berço SC; Câmara de Lobos; Condeixa; Elvas; Espinho; Forjães; Gouveia; Idanhense; Limianos; Louletano; Macedo de Cavaleiros; Mirandela; Operário; Peniche; Pinhalnovense (withdrew); Sacavenense; Santa Marta de Penaguião; Sp. Ideal; União de Coimbra; União da Madeira (withdrew); União Montemor; Vila Real; Vitória de Sernache

The 2021–22 Campeonato de Portugal was the ninth season of Portuguese football's recreated fourth-tier league, since the merging of the Segunda Divisão and Terceira Divisão in 2013, and the seventh season under the current Campeonato de Portugal title. After the creation of Liga 3, the new third-tier league in 2021, this was also the first season of Campeonato Portugal as the fourth-tier league in Portuguese football league system, the 24th overall at that level. This edition was contested by 61 clubs.

== Format ==
After the transition season of 2020–21, due to COVID effects and creation of Liga 3, the number of participating teams was reduced from 96 to 63. After two teams withdrew before the draw, the competition has 61 teams.

The new competition format consists of three stages. In the first stage, the 61 clubs were divided in five series of 10 teams and one series of 11 teams, according to geographic criteria, with a maximum of two reserve teams in each series. In each series, teams played against each other in a home-and-away double round-robin system.

In the second stage, the two best-placed teams of each of six series advanced to the promotion series, while the remaining teams disputed the relegation series. In the promotion series, the 12 teams were divided in two series of 6 teams, according to geographic criteria. The two best-placed teams of each series were promoted to Liga 3. In the third stage, each winner of promotion series faced each other on a neutral venue to decide the champion.

In the relegation series, the 49 teams were divided in eleven series of 4 teams and one series of 5 teams, with the series with 5 teams having the teams located further north. In each series, teams played against each other in a home-and-away double round-robin system. The two best-placed teams of each series, a total of 24 teams, secured a spot in 2022–23 Campeonato de Portugal. All the remaining teams were relegated to the District Championships.

== Teams ==
Location of teams of the 2021–22 Campeonato de Portugal first stage (Mainland).
Brown: Serie A; Purple: Serie B; Orange: Serie C; Yellow: Serie D;
Green: Serie E; Blue: Serie F.
Location of teams of the 2021–22 Campeonato de Portugal (Madeira).
Brown: Serie A.
Location of teams of the 2021–22 Campeonato de Portugal (Azores).
Yellow: Serie D;
Green: Serie E.

Teams from 2020–21 Campeonato de Portugal:

From Serie A:

- Merelinense
- Mirandela
- Maria da Fonte
- Vianense
- Länk Vilaverdense
- Pedras Salgadas

From Serie B:

- São Martinho
- Berço
- Tirsense
- Camacha

From Serie C:

- Leça
- Gondomar
- Marítimo B
- Amarante
- Salgueiros
- Paredes
- Vila Real
- União da Madeira
- Câmara de Lobos

From Serie D:

- Castro Daire
- Valadares
- Espinho

From Serie E:

- Benfica Castelo Branco
- Condeixa
- Marinhense
- Oleiros
- Sertanense
- Vitória de Sernache

From Serie F:

- Loures
- Sintrense
- Sacavenense
- Pêro Pinheiro

From Serie G:

- Praiense
- Fontinhas
- Rabo de Peixe
- Sp. Ideal

From Serie H:

- Olhanense
- Louletano
- Moncarapachense
- Pinhalnovense
- Juventude de Évora
- Esperança de Lagos

Promoted from 2021 to 2022 District Championships:

- Algarve FA: Imortal (Note: AF Algarve championship was not concluded due to COVID-19 pandemic. The championship leader when the championship was stopped, Imortal was invited to Campeonato Portugal.)
- Aveiro FA: Alvarenga
- Azores Champ.: Operário (Note: Açores championship was not concluded due to COVID-19 pandemic. The championship leader when the championship was stopped, Operário dos Açores was invited to Campeonato Portugal.)
- Beja FA: Serpa (Note: AF Beja championship was not concluded due to COVID-19 pandemic. The championship leader when the championship was stopped, Serpa was invited to Campeonato Portugal.)
- Braga FA: Forjães
- Bragança FA: Macedo de Cavaleiros (Note: AF Bragança championship was not concluded due to COVID-19 pandemic. The championship leader when the championship was stopped, Macedo de Cavaleiros was invited to Campeonato Portugal.)
- Castelo Branco FA: Idanhense (Note: AF Castelo Branco championship was not concluded due to COVID-19 pandemic. The championship leader when the championship was stopped, Idanhense was invited to Campeonato Portugal.)
- Coimbra FA: União de Coimbra
- Évora FA: União Montemor (Note: AF Évora championship was not concluded due to COVID-19 pandemic. The championship leader when the championship was stopped, União Montemor was invited to Campeonato Portugal.)
- Guarda FA: ~~Trancoso~~ Gouveia (Note: Trancoso was the champion but decided not to be promoted. Gouveia as AF Guarda runner-up was invited and accepted the promotion.)
- Leiria FA: Peniche
- Lisboa FA: Belenenses
- Madeira FA: none (Note: Due to COVID-19 there was no District football in 2020-21 in Madeira. The three non-professional clubs from Madeira in 2020-21 Campeonato de Portugal, withdrew from competition but they were granted a spot in next edition.)
- Portalegre FA: Elvas (Note: AF Portalegre championship was not concluded due to COVID-19 pandemic. The championship leader when the championship was stopped, Elvas was invited to Campeonato Portugal.)
- Porto FA: Vila Meã
- Santarém FA: Coruchense
- Setúbal FA: Barreirense
- Viana do Castelo FA: Limianos
- Vila Real FA: Santa Marta de Penaguião
- Viseu FA: Ferreira de Aves

== First stage ==
The first stage schedule was drawn on 23 July 2021 and was played from 29 August 2021 to 6 March 2022.

=== Serie A ===
Pos	Team	Pld	W	D	L	GF	GA	GD	Pts	Qualification or relegation
1	Länk Vilaverdense	18	13	3	2	40	18	+22	42	Advance to Promotion Series
2	Marítimo B	18	11	5	2	38	20	+18	38	Advance to Promotion Series
3	Limianos	18	9	4	5	30	22	+8	31	Advance to Relegation Series
4	Maria da Fonte	18	8	3	7	24	21	+3	27	Advance to Relegation Series
5	Pedras Salgadas	18	7	5	6	22	22	0	26	Advance to Relegation Series
6	Camacha	18	7	4	7	25	22	+3	25	Advance to Relegation Series
7	Vianense	18	7	1	10	23	29	−6	22	Advance to Relegation Series
8	Merelinense	18	5	4	9	24	30	−6	19	Advance to Relegation Series
9	Forjães	18	3	4	11	27	46	−19	13	Advance to Relegation Series
10	Câmara de Lobos	18	3	1	14	20	43	−23	10	Advance to Relegation Series
11	União da Madeira	0	0	0	0	0	0	0	0	Withdrew

Updated to match(es) played on 6 March 2022. Source: FPF.pt
Rules for classification: 1) Points, 2) Head-to-head points, 3) Head-to-head goal difference, 4) Goal difference, 5) Matches won, 6) Goals scored

=== Serie B ===
Pos	Team	Pld	W	D	L	GF	GA	GD	Pts	Qualification or relegation
1	Paredes	18	12	3	3	23	9	+14	39	Advance to Promotion Series
2	São Martinho	18	11	5	2	29	10	+19	38	Advance to Promotion Series
3	Tirsense	18	9	7	2	17	8	+9	34	Advance to Relegation Series
4	Mirandela	18	10	3	5	21	16	+5	33	Advance to Relegation Series
5	Amarante	18	8	6	4	33	21	+12	30	Advance to Relegation Series
6	Vila Meã	18	7	3	8	22	20	+2	24	Advance to Relegation Series
7	Vila Real	18	4	5	9	21	36	−15	17	Advance to Relegation Series
8	Santa Marta de Penaguião	18	4	3	11	15	33	−18	15	Advance to Relegation Series
9	Berço	18	3	4	11	16	27	−11	13	Advance to Relegation Series
10	Macedo de Cavaleiros	18	1	3	14	10	27	−17	6	Advance to Relegation Series

Updated to match(es) played on 6 March 2022. Source: FPF.pt
Rules for classification: 1) Points, 2) Head-to-head points, 3) Head-to-head goal difference, 4) Goal difference, 5) Matches won, 6) Goals scored

=== Serie C ===
Pos	Team	Pld	W	D	L	GF	GA	GD	Pts	Qualification or relegation
1	Salgueiros	18	13	4	1	29	14	+15	43	Advance to Promotion Series
2	Leça	18	12	3	3	36	15	+21	39	Advance to Promotion Series
3	Gondomar	18	10	3	5	34	19	+15	33	Advance to Relegation Series
4	Castro Daire	18	9	5	4	25	15	+10	32	Advance to Relegation Series
5	Espinho	18	8	5	5	24	13	+11	29	Advance to Relegation Series
6	Alvarenga	18	5	5	8	13	16	−3	20 (Note: Alvarenga are ranked ahead of Valadares on head-to-head away goals: Alvarenga 1–0 Valadares, Valadares 1–1 Alvarenga.)	Advance to Relegation Series
7	Valadares	18	5	5	8	22	20	+2	20	Advance to Relegation Series
8	União de Coimbra	18	4	4	10	17	29	−12	16	Advance to Relegation Series
9	Ferreira de Aves	18	3	3	12	6	35	−29	12	Advance to Relegation Series
10	Gouveia	18	1	3	14	8	38	−30	6	Advance to Relegation Series

Updated to match(es) played on 6 March 2022. Source: FPF.pt
Rules for classification: 1) Points, 2) Head-to-head points, 3) Head-to-head goal difference, 4) Goal difference, 5) Matches won, 6) Goals scored

=== Serie D ===
Pos	Team	Pld	W	D	L	GF	GA	GD	Pts	Qualification or relegation
1	Fontinhas	18	14	2	2	32	15	+17	44	Advance to Promotion Series
2	Sertanense	18	12	3	3	30	12	+18	39	Advance to Promotion Series
3	Marinhense	18	7	6	5	19	18	+1	27	Advance to Relegation Series
4	Praiense	18	6	4	8	20	23	−3	22	Advance to Relegation Series
5	Vitória de Sernache	18	4	9	5	24	24	0	21 (Note: Vitória de Sernache are ranked ahead of Peniche on head-to-head away goals: Vitória de Sernache 0–0 Peniche, Peniche 2–2 Vitória de Sernache.)	Advance to Relegation Series
6	Peniche	18	5	6	7	20	22	−2	21	Advance to Relegation Series
7	Oleiros	18	5	5	8	11	17	−6	20	Advance to Relegation Series
8	Benfica Castelo Branco	18	4	7	7	13	19	−6	19 (Note: Benfica Castelo Branco are ranked ahead of Condeixa on head-to-head away goals: Benfica Castelo Branco 0–1 Condeixa, Condeixa 0–2 Benfica Castelo Branco.)	Advance to Relegation Series
9	Condeixa	18	6	1	11	21	23	−2	19	Advance to Relegation Series
10	Idanhense	18	1	9	8	18	35	−17	12	Advance to Relegation Series

Updated to match(es) played on 6 March 2022. Source: FPF.pt
Rules for classification: 1) Points, 2) Head-to-head points, 3) Head-to-head goal difference, 4) Goal difference, 5) Matches won, 6) Goals scored

=== Serie E ===
Pos	Team	Pld	W	D	L	GF	GA	GD	Pts	Qualification or relegation
1	Belenenses	18	10	3	5	25	12	+13	33	Advance to Promotion Series
2	Pêro Pinheiro	18	9	4	5	21	19	+2	31	Advance to Promotion Series
3	Loures	18	9	3	6	29	22	+7	30	Advance to Relegation Series
4	Sintrense	18	6	11	1	19	12	+7	29 (Note: Sintrense are ranked ahead of Sacavenense on head-to-head away goals: Sintrense 1–0 Sacavenense, Sacavenense 1–1 Sintrense.)	Advance to Relegation Series
5	Sacavenense	18	7	8	3	16	13	+3	29	Advance to Relegation Series
6	Operário	18	5	6	7	14	15	−1	21 (Note: Operário are ranked ahead of Coruchense on head-to-head away goals: Operário 0–0 Coruchense, Coruchense 1–3 Operário.)	Advance to Relegation Series
7	Coruchense	18	6	3	9	26	29	−3	21	Advance to Relegation Series
8	Sp. Ideal	18	4	6	8	22	25	−3	18	Advance to Relegation Series
9	Elvas	18	4	5	9	11	25	−14	17	Advance to Relegation Series
10	Rabo de Peixe	18	3	5	10	13	24	−11	14	Advance to Relegation Series

Updated to match(es) played on 6 March 2022. Source: FPF.pt
Rules for classification: 1) Points, 2) Head-to-head points, 3) Head-to-head goal difference, 4) Goal difference, 5) Matches won, 6) Goals scored

=== Serie F ===
Pos	Team	Pld	W	D	L	GF	GA	GD	Pts	Qualification or relegation
1	Olhanense	16	10	6	0	32	15	+17	36	Advance to Promotion Series
2	Moncarapachense	16	9	6	1	31	12	+19	33	Advance to Promotion Series
3	Louletano	16	9	5	2	37	15	+22	32	Advance to Relegation Series
4	Juventude de Évora	16	6	6	4	26	12	+14	24	Advance to Relegation Series
5	Esperança de Lagos	16	5	4	7	20	25	−5	19	Advance to Relegation Series
6	Serpa	16	4	4	8	18	32	−14	16	Advance to Relegation Series
7	Imortal	16	2	6	8	9	26	−17	12 (Note: Imortal are ranked ahead of União de Montemor on head-to-head away goals: Imortal 0–1 União de Montemor, União de Montemor 0–2 Imortal.)	Advance to Relegation Series
8	União Montemor	16	3	3	10	12	28	−16	12	Advance to Relegation Series
9	Barreirense	16	1	6	9	10	30	−20	9	Advance to Relegation Series
10	Pinhalnovense	0	0	0	0	0	0	0	0	Withdrew

Updated to match(es) played on 6 March 2022. Source: FPF.pt
Rules for classification: 1) Points, 2) Head-to-head points, 3) Head-to-head goal difference, 4) Goal difference, 5) Matches won, 6) Goals scored

== Second stage ==
=== Promotion ===
==== North zone ====
Pos	Team	Pld	W	D	L	GF	GA	GD	Pts	Qualification or relegation
1	Paredes (P)	10	5	3	2	10	7	+3	18	Promotion to Liga 3
2	Länk Vilaverdense (P)	10	4	3	3	14	12	+2	15 (Note: Länk Vilaverdense are ranked ahead of Leça on head-to-head away goals: Länk Vilaverdense 3–2 Sintrense, Leça 0–2 Länk Vilaverdense.)	Promotion to Liga 3
3	Leça	10	4	3	3	11	9	+2	15	
4	Salgueiros	10	2	5	3	10	12	−2	11 (Note: Salgueiros are ranked ahead of São Martinho on head-to-head away goals: Salgueiros 0–1 São Martinho, São Martinho 1–2 Salgueiros.)	
5	São Martinho	10	2	5	3	10	11	−1	11	
6	Marítimo B	10	1	5	4	12	16	−4	8	

Updated to match(es) played on 28 May 2022. Source: FPF.pt
Rules for classification: 1) points, 2) head-to-head points, 3) head-to-head goal difference, 4) goal difference, 5) matches won, 6) goals scored
(P) Promoted

==== South zone ====
Pos	Team	Pld	W	D	L	GF	GA	GD	Pts	Qualification or relegation
1	Fontinhas (P)	10	6	2	2	12	8	+4	20	Promotion to Liga 3
2	Moncarapachense (P)	10	5	4	1	9	3	+6	19	Promotion to Liga 3
3	Belenenses (P)	10	4	4	2	17	9	+8	16 (Note: The failure to register Cova da Piedade (transferred from 2020–21 Liga 2) in 2022–23 Liga 3 allows the best 3rd place in the Portuguese Liga to move up as well.)	Promotion to Liga 3
4	Sertanense	10	2	5	3	11	11	0	11	
5	Olhanense	10	1	4	5	5	14	−9	7	
6	Pêro Pinheiro	10	0	5	5	5	14	−9	5	

Updated to match(es) played on 29 May 2022. Source: FPF.pt
Rules for classification: 1) points, 2) head-to-head points, 3) head-to-head goal difference, 4) goal difference, 5) matches won, 6) goals scored
(P) Promoted

=== Relegation ===
==== Serie A ====
Pos	Team	Pld	W	D	L	GF	GA	GD	Pts	Qualification or relegation
1	Vianense	6	4	1	1	9	4	+5	13	
2	Merelinense	6	3	1	2	9	9	0	10	
3	Limianos (R)	6	1	3	2	7	8	−1	6	Relegation to District Championships
4	Forjães (R)	6	1	1	4	6	10	−4	4	Relegation to District Championships

Updated to match(es) played on 8 May 2022. Source: FPF.pt
Rules for classification: 1) points, 2) head-to-head points, 3) head-to-head goal difference, 4) goal difference, 5) matches won, 6) goals scored
(R) Relegated

==== Serie B ====
Pos	Team	Pld	W	D	L	GF	GA	GD	Pts	Qualification or relegation
1	Pedras Salgadas	6	2	4	0	5	2	+3	10	
2	Maria da Fonte	6	2	2	2	5	5	0	8	
3	Macedo de Cavaleiros (R)	6	1	3	2	4	6	−2	6 (Note: Macedo de Cavaleiros are ranked ahead of Mirandela on head-to-head away goals: Macedo de Cavaleiros 1–0 Mirandela, Mirandela 1–1 Macedo de Cavaleiros.)	Relegation to District Championships
4	Mirandela (R)	6	1	3	2	2	3	−1	6	Relegation to District Championships

Updated to match(es) played on 8 May 2022. Source: FPF.pt
Rules for classification: 1) points, 2) head-to-head points, 3) head-to-head goal difference, 4) goal difference, 5) matches won, 6) goals scored
(R) Relegated

==== Serie C ====
Pos	Team	Pld	W	D	L	GF	GA	GD	Pts	Qualification or relegation
1	Amarante	6	4	1	1	15	5	+10	13	
2	Tirsense	6	2	3	1	7	7	0	9	
3	Vila Real (R)	6	2	1	3	5	10	−5	7	Relegation to District Championships
4	Berço (R)	6	1	1	4	8	13	−5	4	Relegation to District Championships

Updated to match(es) played on 8 May 2022. Source: FPF.pt
Rules for classification: 1) points, 2) head-to-head points, 3) head-to-head goal difference, 4) goal difference, 5) matches won, 6) goals scored
(R) Relegated

==== Serie D ====
Pos	Team	Pld	W	D	L	GF	GA	GD	Pts	Qualification or relegation
1	Camacha	6	3	3	0	10	4	+6	12	
2	Vila Meã	6	1	4	1	5	5	0	7	
3	Santa Marta de Penaguião (R)	6	1	3	2	4	6	−2	6	Relegation to District Championships
4	Câmara de Lobos (R)	6	1	2	3	7	11	−4	5	Relegation to District Championships

Updated to match(es) played on 8 May 2022. Source: FPF.pt
Rules for classification: 1) points, 2) head-to-head points, 3) head-to-head goal difference, 4) goal difference, 5) matches won, 6) goals scored
(R) Relegated

==== Serie E ====
Pos	Team	Pld	W	D	L	GF	GA	GD	Pts	Qualification or relegation
1	Valadares	6	5	1	0	10	2	+8	16	
2	Gondomar	6	2	2	2	7	10	−3	8 (Note: Gondomar are ranked ahead of Espinho on head-to-head away goals: Gondomar 1–1 Espinho, Espinho 0–1 Gondomar.)	
3	Espinho (R)	6	2	2	2	5	5	0	8	Relegation to District Championships
4	Alvarenga (R)	6	0	1	5	6	11	−5	1	Relegation to District Championships

Updated to match(es) played on 8 May 2022. Source: FPF.pt
Rules for classification: 1) points, 2) head-to-head points, 3) head-to-head goal difference, 4) goal difference, 5) matches won, 6) goals scored
(R) Relegated

==== Série F ====
Pos	Team	Pld	W	D	L	GF	GA	GD	Pts	Qualification or relegation
1	Castro Daire	6	3	2	1	8	1	+7	11 (Note: Castro Daire are ranked ahead of Ferreira das Aves on head-to-head away goals: Castro Daire 3–0 Ferreira de Ave, Ferreira de Ave 1–0 Castro Daire.)	
2	Ferreira de Aves	6	3	2	1	7	7	0	11	
3	União de Coimbra (R)	6	2	4	0	6	4	+2	10	Relegation to District Championships
4	Gouveia (R)	6	0	0	6	2	11	−9	0	Relegation to District Championships

Updated to match(es) played on 8 May 2022. Source: FPF.pt
Rules for classification: 1) points, 2) head-to-head points, 3) head-to-head goal difference, 4) goal difference, 5) matches won, 6) goals scored
(R) Relegated

==== Serie G ====
Pos	Team	Pld	W	D	L	GF	GA	GD	Pts	Qualification or relegation
1	Benfica Castelo Branco	6	4	2	0	14	7	+7	14	
2	Oleiros	6	3	2	1	7	5	+2	11	
3	Idanhense (R)	6	1	1	4	4	8	−4	4	Relegation to District Championships
4	Condeixa (R)	6	0	3	3	6	11	−5	3	Relegation to District Championships

Updated to match(es) played on 8 May 2022. Source: FPF.pt
Rules for classification: 1) points, 2) head-to-head points, 3) head-to-head goal difference, 4) goal difference, 5) matches won, 6) goals scored
(R) Relegated

==== Serie H ====
Pos	Team	Pld	W	D	L	GF	GA	GD	Pts	Qualification or relegation
1	Marinhense	6	3	3	0	6	2	+4	12	
2	Coruchense	6	3	1	2	8	5	+3	10	
3	Vitória de Sernache (R)	6	2	2	2	7	5	+2	8	Relegation to District Championships
4	Peniche (R)	6	0	2	4	2	11	−9	2	Relegation to District Championships

Updated to match(es) played on 8 May 2022. Source: FPF.pt
Rules for classification: 1) points, 2) head-to-head points, 3) head-to-head goal difference, 4) goal difference, 5) matches won, 6) goals scored
(R) Relegated

==== Serie I ====
Pos	Team	Pld	W	D	L	GF	GA	GD	Pts	Qualification or relegation
1	Sintrense	6	4	1	1	10	4	+6	13 (Note: Loures are ranked ahead of Sintrense on head-to-head away goals: Loures 1–1 Sintrense, Sintrense 0–1 Loures.)	
2	Loures	6	4	1	1	7	4	+3	13	
3	Sacavenense (R)	6	3	0	3	10	8	+2	9	Relegation to District Championships
4	Elvas (R)	6	0	0	6	3	14	−11	0	Relegation to District Championships

Updated to match(es) played on 8 May 2022. Source: FPF.pt
Rules for classification: 1) points, 2) head-to-head points, 3) head-to-head goal difference, 4) goal difference, 5) matches won, 6) goals scored
(R) Relegated

==== Serie J ====
Pos	Team	Pld	W	D	L	GF	GA	GD	Pts	Qualification or relegation
1	Praiense	6	3	3	0	12	6	+6	12	
2	Rabo de Peixe	6	2	3	1	11	5	+6	9	
3	Operário (R)	6	2	2	2	8	7	+1	8	Relegation to District Championships
4	Sp. Ideal (R)	6	1	0	5	4	17	−13	3	Relegation to District Championships

Updated to match(es) played on 8 May 2022. Source: FPF.pt
Rules for classification: 1) points, 2) head-to-head points, 3) head-to-head goal difference, 4) goal difference, 5) matches won, 6) goals scored
(R) Relegated

==== Série K ====
Pos	Team	Pld	W	D	L	GF	GA	GD	Pts	Qualification or relegation
1	Juventude de Évora	6	5	0	1	10	3	+7	15	
2	Serpa	6	3	1	2	10	6	+4	10	
3	Barreirense (R)	6	2	2	2	7	7	0	8	Relegation to District Championships
4	União Montemor (R)	6	0	1	5	3	14	−11	1	Relegation to District Championships

Updated to match(es) played on 8 May 2022. Source: FPF.pt
Rules for classification: 1) points, 2) head-to-head points, 3) head-to-head goal difference, 4) goal difference, 5) matches won, 6) goals scored
(R) Relegated

==== Serie L ====
Pos	Team	Pld	W	D	L	GF	GA	GD	Pts	Qualification or relegation
1	Imortal	4	2	1	1	4	3	+1	7	
2	Esperança de Lagos	4	1	2	1	4	7	−3	5	
3	Louletano (R)	4	1	1	2	7	5	+2	4	Relegation to District Championships

Updated to match(es) played on 5 May 2022. Source: FPF.pt
Rules for classification: 1) points, 2) head-to-head points, 3) head-to-head goal difference, 4) goal difference, 5) matches won, 6) goals scored
(R) Relegated

== Third stage ==
=== Championship final ===
4 June 2022
17:00

Paredes	4 – 0	Fontinhas
Hélder Pedro 1'; Amadeu 65'; Nilo 80'; Nelson Piquet 90+4'

Estádio Nacional
