= 2024–25 Campeonato de Portugal =

10th season of the Campeonato de Portugal football league

Campeonato de Portugal
- Season: 2024–25
- Dates: 17 August 2024 – 14 June 2025
- Champions: Lusitano Évora
- Promoted: Amora; Lusitano Évora; Paredes; Vitória de Guimarães B Marco 09
- Relegated: Alcains; Atlético dos Arcos; Barreirense; Coimbrões; Dumiense; Estrela de Vendas Novas; Fabril do Barreiro; Gondomar; Guarda; Joane; Marítimo B Moura; Operário; Os Sandinenses; Pero Pinheiro; Pevidém; Régua; Sertanense; Sp. Pombal; União 1919
- Top goalscorer: Pedro Martelo (19 goals)

The 2024–25 Campeonato de Portugal is the twelfth season of Portuguese football's renovated fourth-tier league, since the merging of the Segunda Divisão and Terceira Divisão in 2013, and the ninth season under the current Campeonato de Portugal title. After the creation of Liga 3, the new third-tier league in 2021, this is the fourth season of Campeonato Portugal as the fourth-tier league in Portuguese football league system, the 27th overall at that level.

This edition is contested by 56 clubs: 4 clubs relegated from 2023–24 Liga 3, 24 clubs promoted by 2023–24 District Championships and 28 clubs from the 2023–24 Campeonato de Portugal.

== Teams ==
Location of teams in 2024-25 Campeonato de Portugal (Mainland).
Orange: Serie A; Yellow: Serie B;
Green: Serie C; Blue: Serie D.
Location of teams in 2024-25 de Portugal (Azores)
Location of teams in 2024-25 Campeonato de Portugal (Madeira)

Team	Location	2023–24 finish
Amora	Amora	3rd Liga 3 Relegation Serie 2
Vianense	Viana do Castelo	4th Liga 3 Relegation Serie 1
Pêro Pinheiro	Sintra	4th Liga 3 Relegation Serie 2
Limianos	Ponte de Lima	3rd CP Promotion Serie 1
Pevidém	Guimarães	4th CP Promotion Serie 1
Moncarapachense	Olhão	4th CP Promotion Serie 2
Tirsense	Santo Tirso	3rd CP Serie A
Gondomar	Gondomar	3rd CP Serie B
Marinhense	Marinha Grande	3rd CP Serie C
Lusitano de Évora	Évora	3rd CP Serie D
Camacha	Santa Cruz	4th CP Serie A
Marco 09	Marco de Canaveses	4th CP Serie B
União 1919	Coimbra	4th CP Serie C
Louletano	Loulé	4th CP Serie D
Brito	Brito	5th CP Serie A
Rebordosa	Paredes	5th CP Serie B
Benfica Castelo Branco	Castelo Branco	5th CP Serie C
Sintrense	Sintra	5th CP Serie D
Dumiense	Braga	6th CP Serie A
Paredes	Paredes	6th CP Serie B
Sertanense	Sertã	6th CP Serie C
O Elvas	Elvas	6th CP Serie D
Os Sandinenses	Vila Nova de Famalicão	7th CP Serie A
Salgueiros	Porto	7th CP Serie B
Mortágua	Mortágua	7th CP Serie C
Barreirense	Barreiro	7th CP Serie D
Vila Real	Vila Real	8th CP Serie A
Vitória de Guimarães B	Guimarães	8th CP Serie B
Alverca B	Vila Franca de Xira	8th CP Serie C
Fabril	Barreiro	8th CP Serie D
Marítimo B	Funchal	9th CP Serie A
Beira-Mar	Aveiro	9th CP Serie B
Peniche	Peniche	9th CP Serie C
Serpa	Serpa	9th CP Serie D
Lagoa	Lagoa	1st Algarve FA District
Operário	Lagoa	1st Azores FA District
União de Lamas	Santa Maria de Lamas	1st Aveiro FA District
Moura	Moura	1st Beja FA District
Joane	Joane	1st Braga FA District
Bragança	Bragança	1st Bragança FA District
Alcains	Alcains	1st Castelo Branco FA District
Marialvas	Cantanhede	1st Coimbra FA District
Estrela de Vendas Novas	Vendas Novas	1st Évora FA District
Guarda	Guarda	1st Guarda FA District
Sporting de Pombal	Pombal	1st Leiria FA District
Estrela da Amadora B	Amadora	1st Lisbon FA District
Machico	Machico	1st Madeira FA District
Coimbrões	Vila Nova de Gaia	1st Porto FA District
Fátima	Fátima	1st Santarém FA District
Atlético dos Arcos	Arcos de Valdevez	1st Viana do Castelo FA District
Régua	Régua	1st Vila Real FA District
Cinfães	Cinfães	1st Viseu FA District
Arronches	Arronches	2nd Portalegre FA District
Alpendorada	Marco de Canaveses	2nd Porto FA District
Comércio e Indústria	Setúbal	2nd Setúbal FA District
Leça	Leça da Palmeira	3rd Porto FA District

== Group stage ==
=== Serie A ===
Pos	Team	Pld	W	D	L	GF	GA	GD	Pts	Qualification or relegation	VSC	PAR	BRA	REB	BRI	VIA	TIR	VLR	LIM	JOA	PEV	SAN	DUM	ARC
1	Vitória de Guimarães B (Q)	26	17	5	4	45	21	+24	56	Qualification to Promotion play-offs		2–1	4–0	1–0	3–1	2–1	2–1	3–0	3–0	3–2	0–1	2–1	2–0	1–1
2	Paredes (Q)	26	16	4	6	51	21	+30	52	Qualification to Promotion play-offs	0–1		2–1	0–1	2–0	2–0	1–0	1–0	0–0	4–1	4–0	4–0	6–1	1–1
3	Bragança	26	12	8	6	38	29	+9	44		1–1	1–1		3–0	2–0	2–2	1–0	1–2	1–0	1–2	2–1	1–1	2–1	1–0
4	Rebordosa	26	12	6	8	39	25	+14	42		4–1	0–1	0–0		3–4	1–0	2–1	5–0	1–0	3–0	2–1	2–2	5–1	3–0
5	Brito	26	12	4	10	41	40	+1	40		0–3	2–0	2–2	1–0		2–0	1–0	2–0	1–2	2–1	1–0	4–2	1–1	3–1
6	Vianense	26	11	3	12	31	37	−6	36		0–2	1–5	1–0	0–1	1–0		3–2	2–1	2–0	2–1	1–2	1–1	1–0	1–0
7	Tirsense	26	10	5	11	39	35	+4	35 (Note: Ranked on head-to-head: Tirsense 1–0 Vila Real; Vila Real 1–1 Tirsense.)		1–0	2–4	0–1	3–3	3–1	3–2		1–0	0–0	1–2	3–0	1–0	4–1	1–2
8	Vila Real	26	10	5	11	30	32	−2	35		2–1	1–0	1–1	0–0	3–1	3–0	1–1		2–0	2–0	0–0	1–2	3–1	1–1
9	Limianos	26	8	10	8	37	36	+1	34		1–1	3–4	1–1	0–1	2–1	1–1	2–2	4–2		2–0	2–2	2–1	2–2	2–1
10	Joane (R)	26	7	7	12	26	38	−12	28 (Note: Ranked on head-to-head points: Joane 7; Pevidém 6; Sandinenses 4.)	Relegation to District Championship	0–1	1–1	0–3	2–1	2–2	0–1	0–0	2–1	1–1		2–1	2–0	4–3	0–0
11	Pevidém (R)	26	7	7	12	24	35	−11	28	Relegation to District Championship	1–2	2–1	1–2	1–1	0–0	1–2	3–2	1–0	1–1	1–0		2–0	1–1	1–3
12	Os Sandinenses (R)	26	7	7	12	30	41	−11	28	Relegation to District Championship	1–1	0–1	2–4	0–0	4–1	3–1	3–4	1–0	1–4	0–0	1–0		0–1	2–1
13	Dumiense (Note: Dumiense were deducted 1 point for financial irregularities.) (R)	26	6	6	14	25	52	−27	23 (Note: Ranked on head-to-head: Dumiense 3–2 Atlético dos Arcos; Atlético dos Arcos 0–1 Dumiense.)	Relegation to District Championship	0–2	0–2	2–1	1–0	1–5	0–4	0–1	1–2	1–0	1–1	0–0	1–1		3–2
14	Atlético dos Arcos (R)	26	6	5	15	24	38	−14	23	Relegation to District Championship	1–1	0–3	0–1	2–0	2–3	2–1	0–2	0–2	1–3	1–0	2–0	0–1	0–1	

Updated to match(es) played on 13 April 2025. Source: FPF.pt
Rules for classification: 1) Points, 2) Head-to-head points, 3) Head-to-head goal difference, 4) Goal difference, 5) Matches won, 6) Goals scored
(Q) Qualified for the phase indicated; (R) Relegated

=== Serie B ===
Pos	Team	Pld	W	D	L	GF	GA	GD	Pts	Qualification or relegation	LEC	MRC	SAL	CIN	BEI	ULA	ALP	MAC	CAM	GUA	GON	COI	MAB	REG
1	Leça (Q)	26	19	5	2	52	17	+35	62	Qualification to Promotion play-offs		0–0	0–2	1–0	3–0	4–2	3–0	1–2	4–1	6–2	3–2	1–0	3–1	3–1
2	Marco 09 (Q)	26	16	5	5	35	16	+19	53 (Note: Ranked on head-to-head: Marco 09 2-1 Salgueiros; Salgueiros 0-3 Marco 09.)	Qualification to Promotion play-offs	0–1		2–1	1–1	1–1	1–0	0–3	1–0	4–1	4–0	1–0	0–1	2–1	2–1
3	Salgueiros	26	16	5	5	39	18	+21	53		0–1	0–3		2–1	1–1	1–0	0–0	2–0	2–0	2–0	3–0	1–0	4–0	1–0
4	Cinfães	26	11	8	7	33	25	+8	41		0–1	2–1	2–3		2–2	0–0	1–3	0–2	1–1	1–0	0–0	3–1	2–0	2–1
5	Beira-Mar	26	10	9	7	31	28	+3	39		0–1	0–3	2–0	0–1		0–0	2–0	1–1	2–1	0–2	0–1	3–1	1–1	1–0
6	União de Lamas	26	11	5	10	31	27	+4	38		0–3	0–2	2–1	1–0	0–2		0–0	4–1	2–0	0–1	4–0	1–0	1–0	2–1
7	Alpendorada	26	10	6	10	26	24	+2	36		1–1	0–1	0–1	0–2	1–2	2–2		2–0	3–1	0–1	1–0	2–1	1–0	3–1
8	Machico	26	9	8	9	28	27	+1	35		1–1	0–1	1–1	0–0	3–1	0–1	2–1		1–1	1–0	3–2	2–0	1–1	4–0
9	Camacha	26	8	11	7	30	35	−5	35		1–1	1–1	1–1	1–3	2–2	2–0	0–0	0–0		1–1	2–0	3–2	1–0	1–0
10	Guarda (R)	26	9	5	12	26	30	−4	32	Relegation to District Championship	0–0	1–0	1–2	0–0	0–1	0–1	0–1	3–0	1–2		1–1	3–2	3–1	1–1
11	Gondomar (R)	26	8	7	11	16	28	−12	31	Relegation to District Championship	0–2	0–1	0–0	0–3	0–2	2–1	1–0	2–0	0–0	1–0		0–0	1–1	1–0
12	Coimbrões (R)	26	5	6	15	24	43	−19	21	Relegation to District Championship	0–3	1–1	0–3	2–2	1–1	1–0	1–0	1–0	2–3	0–2	0–0		1–2	2–2
13	Marítimo B (R)	26	4	5	17	25	49	−24	17	Relegation to District Championship	0–3	0–1	1–2	2–3	2–2	1–5	0–1	0–3	2–2	1–3	0–1	3–1		1–0
14	Régua (R)	26	1	5	20	15	44	−29	8	Relegation to District Championship	0–1	0–1	0–3	0–1	0–2	2–2	1–1	0–0	0–1	1–0	0–1	2–3	1–4	

Updated to match(es) played on 13 April 2025. Source: FPF.pt
Rules for classification: 1) Points, 2) Head-to-head points, 3) Head-to-head goal difference, 4) Goal difference, 5) Matches won, 6) Goals scored
(Q) Qualified for the phase indicated; (R) Relegated

=== Serie C ===
Pos	Team	Pld	W	D	L	GF	GA	GD	Pts	Qualification or relegation	ELV	FAT	ARR	PEN	MRV	MOR	MAR	ALV	BCB	POM	UDC	SER	ALC	PER
1	O Elvas (Q)	26	20	5	1	41	10	+31	65	Qualification to Promotion play-offs		1–0	0–0	0–0	2–0	1–0	1–0	2–1	3–0	4–0	2–1	1–0	3–0	1–0
2	Fátima (Q)	26	14	7	5	30	12	+18	49	Qualification to Promotion play-offs	0–0		1–0	0–1	4–0	0–0	1–0	3–0	1–0	0–0	1–0	1–1	0–0	4–0
3	Arronches	26	13	9	4	27	16	+11	48		0–1	1–0		1–0	1–0	0–0	1–0	2–0	0–0	2–2	1–1	1–0	1–0	2–1
4	Peniche	26	10	9	7	30	23	+7	39		2–3	0–1	0–2		0–0	3–1	2–0	2–0	1–1	0–3	0–2	3–2	2–0	2–0
5	Marialvas	26	9	10	7	30	28	+2	37		2–3	2–1	2–3	2–0		0–0	2–1	1–1	1–0	1–1	4–1	2–1	1–2	1–1
6	Mortágua	26	8	13	5	24	22	+2	37		1–1	2–0	0–0	0–0	2–2		1–0	0–0	0–0	1–3	2–2	1–1	2–2	1–0
7	Marinhense	26	9	9	8	24	21	+3	36		0–2	2–2	2–1	1–1	1–0	0–1		0–0	0–0	2–0	0–0	2–0	1–0	1–1
8	Alverca B	26	9	8	9	28	25	+3	35		1–3	0–1	2–0	0–0	0–0	1–2	0–1		1–2	2–0	2–1	1–1	1–0	3–1
9	Benfica Castelo Branco	26	8	10	8	23	21	+2	34		0–2	0–0	1–1	0–1	1–2	1–1	0–0	1–2		1–3	6–1	1–0	2–0	2–1
10	Sp. Pombal (R)	26	8	8	10	29	34	−5	32	Relegation to District Championship	0–1	0–3	1–2	2–2	1–1	2–0	1–3	0–0	0–1		3–2	0–2	1–0	3–0
11	União 1919 (R)	26	6	7	13	26	44	−18	25	Relegation to District Championship	2–0	1–2	0–2	0–4	1–1	0–1	0–2	1–4	0–2	1–1		3–2	0–0	2–1
12	Sertanense (R)	26	4	9	13	23	33	−10	21	Relegation to District Championship	0–0	0–1	0–0	1–1	1–1	0–2	2–3	1–1	0–0	3–1	0–2		3–1	1–0
13	Alcains (R)	26	4	6	16	17	36	−19	18	Relegation to District Championship	0–2	1–2	2–3	0–2	0–2	3–1	2–2	0–2	0–0	0–0	0–1	2–0		0–1
14	Pêro Pinheiro (R)	26	2	6	18	12	39	−27	12	Relegation to District Championship	0–2	0–1	0–0	1–1	0–1	0–2	0–0	0–3	0–1	0–1	1–1	2–1	1–2	

Updated to match(es) played on 13 April 2025. Source: FPF.pt
Rules for classification: 1) Points, 2) Head-to-head points, 3) Head-to-head goal difference, 4) Goal difference, 5) Matches won, 6) Goals scored
(Q) Qualified for the phase indicated; (R) Relegated

=== Serie D ===
Pos	Team	Pld	W	D	L	GF	GA	GD	Pts	Qualification or relegation	LUE	AMO	SIN	MNC	LOU	SRP	AMA	LAG	COM	FAB	MOU	OPE	BAR	EVN
1	Lusitano Évora (Q)	26	18	4	4	57	14	+43	58	Qualification to Promotion play-offs		0–1	2–0	4–0	1–0	3–2	1–2	4–0	4–0	4–0	5–0	2–0	2–0	4–0
2	Amora (Q)	26	17	6	3	41	19	+22	57	Qualification to Promotion play-offs	1–1		1–2	1–0	2–1	2–1	2–1	1–0	1–0	2–0	1–1	1–1	1–0	3–0
3	Sintrense	26	16	4	6	39	26	+13	52		1–2	0–1		2–1	0–2	1–0	1–0	1–1	1–0	1–0	2–3	2–1	3–2	3–0
4	Moncarapachense	26	15	6	5	39	19	+20	51		1–0	0–0	1–1		1–0	0–0	1–1	2–0	5–2	2–0	3–0	3–1	3–2	6–1
5	Louletano	26	15	5	6	44	20	+24	50		2–3	1–1	1–1	1–0		2–0	3–3	0–1	1–0	4–0	4–0	1–0	1–1	3–0
6	Serpa	26	13	6	7	42	27	+15	45		0–0	2–4	0–1	2–0	1–3		3–2	4–2	1–1	1–0	2–0	4–0	2–1	2–1
7	Estrela da Amadora B	26	7	9	10	35	31	+4	30		1–2	0–2	1–2	0–1	0–1	2–3		1–1	2–0	0–0	2–2	3–1	2–0	4–1
8	Lagoa	26	7	9	10	26	35	−9	30		3–1	1–1	0–1	0–0	0–5	0–0	0–0		3–2	2–0	0–1	0–0	2–0	2–2
9	Comércio e Indústria	26	8	5	13	35	42	−7	29		0–2	3–2	3–1	0–1	0–1	0–1	1–1	1–2		2–2	2–3	1–0	4–1	1–0
10	Fabril do Barreiro (R)	26	6	9	11	21	32	−11	27	Relegation to District Championship	1–1	0–1	0–1	0–0	2–1	0–0	0–0	2–3	2–2		1–1	1–0	1–1	3–1
11	Moura (R)	26	7	5	14	27	50	−23	26	Relegation to District Championship	0–6	1–2	1–2	0–2	0–1	1–4	1–1	2–1	1–2	0–1		1–2	1–1	2–0
12	Operário (R)	26	6	5	15	22	43	−21	23	Relegation to District Championship	0–0	3–1	2–4	0–3	1–1	0–4	0–1	2–1	0–2	0–1	4–2		0–2	2–1
13	Barreirense (R)	26	5	7	14	31	47	−16	22	Relegation to District Championship	0–1	1–4	1–1	1–2	2–3	1–1	2–1	1–1	4–4	1–0	0–1	1–1		3–1
14	Estrela de Vendas Novas (R)	26	1	2	23	12	66	−54	5	Relegation to District Championship	0–3	0–3	0–4	0–1	0–1	0–2	0–4	1–0	0–2	1–4	0–0	0–1	2–3	

Updated to match(es) played on 13 April 2025. Source: FPF.pt
Rules for classification: 1) Points, 2) Head-to-head points, 3) Head-to-head goal difference, 4) Goal difference, 5) Matches won, 6) Goals scored
(Q) Qualified for the phase indicated; (R) Relegated

== Promotion play-offs ==
=== Serie 1 ===
Pos	Team	Pld	W	D	L	GF	GA	GD	Pts	Qualification	VSC	PAR	MRC	LEC
1	Vitória de Guimarães B (P)	6	3	2	1	14	11	+3	11	Promotion to Liga 3		3–3	3–2	3–4
2	Paredes (P)	6	2	3	1	10	7	+3	9	Promotion to Liga 3	0–2		0–0	2–0
3	Marco 09 (P)	6	1	3	2	6	7	−1	6	Promotion to Liga 3	1–1	0–0		3–2
4	Leça	6	2	0	4	10	15	−5	6		1–2	2–5	1–0	

Updated to match(es) played on 1 June 2025. Source: fpf.pt
Rules for classification: 1) points, 2) head-to-head points, 3) head-to-head goal difference, 4) goal difference, 5) matches won, 6) goals scored
(P) Promoted

=== Serie 2 ===
Pos	Team	Pld	W	D	L	GF	GA	GD	Pts	Qualification	LUE	AMO	ELV	FAT
1	Lusitano Évora (P)	6	6	0	0	15	4	+11	18	Promotion to Liga 3		3–1	2–1	3–0
2	Amora (P)	6	2	2	2	7	7	0	8	Promotion to Liga 3	1–2		1–1	2–0
3	O Elvas	6	1	2	3	6	11	−5	5		1–4	0–0		1–1
4	Fátima	6	1	0	5	4	10	−6	3		0–1	1–2	3–1	

Updated to match(es) played on 1 June 2025. Source: fpf.pt
Rules for classification: 1) points, 2) head-to-head points, 3) head-to-head goal difference, 4) goal difference, 5) matches won, 6) goals scored
(P) Promoted

== Third stage ==
=== Championship final ===
14 June 2025
17:00

Lusitano Évora	1–1 (3–1 p)	Vitória de Guimarães B
Miguel Lopes 62'		Jin-young Yuk 15'

Estádio Nacional, Oeiras
