= 2023–24 Campeonato de Portugal =

10th season of the Campeonato de Portugal football league

Campeonato de Portugal
- Season: 2023–24
- Dates: 19 August 2023 – 10 June 2024
- Champions: Amarante
- Promoted: Amarante; Lusitânia; São João de Ver; União Santarém
- Relegated: Florgrade; Fontinhas; Gouveia; Imortal; Juventude de Évora; Lamelas; Mirandela; Montalegre; Oliveira do Douro; Oriental; Portosantense; Rabo de Peixe; Real SC; Ribeirão 1968; União de Tomar; Valadares Gaia; Vasco da Gama Vidigueira; Vila Meã; Vilar de Perdizes; Vitória de Sernache; Vitória de Setúbal

The 2023–24 Campeonato de Portugal was the eleventh season of Portuguese football's renovated fourth-tier league, since the merging of the Segunda Divisão and Terceira Divisão in 2013, and the eighth season under the current Campeonato de Portugal title. After the creation of Liga 3, the new third-tier league in 2021, this is the third season of Campeonato Portugal as the fourth-tier league in Portuguese football league system, the 26th overall at that level.

This edition is contested by 56 clubs: 8 clubs relegated from 2022–23 Liga 3, 21 clubs promoted by 2022–23 District Championships and 27 clubs from the 2022–23 Campeonato de Portugal.

== Teams ==
Location of teams in 2023-24 Campeonato de Portugal (Mainland).
Orange: Serie A; Yellow: Serie B;
Green: Serie C; Blue: Serie D.
Location of teams in 2023-24 de Portugal (Azores)
Location of teams in 2023-24 Campeonato de Portugal (Madeira)

| Team | Location | 2022–23 finish |
|---|---|---|
| São João de Ver | Santa Maria da Feira | 3rd Liga 3 Relegation Serie 1 |
| Paredes | Paredes | 3rd Liga 3 Relegation Serie 2 |
| Vitória de Setúbal | Setúbal | 3rd Liga 3 Relegation Serie 3 |
| Fontinhas | Praia da Vitória | 3rd Liga 3 Relegation Serie 4 |
| Montalegre | Montalegre | 4th Liga 3 Relegation Serie 1 |
| Vitória de Guimarães B | Guimarães | 4th Liga 3 Relegation Serie 2 |
| Real SC | Sintra | 4th Liga 3 Relegation Serie 3 |
| Moncarapachense | Olhão | 4th Liga 3 Relegation Serie 4 |
| Amarante | Amarante | 3rd CP Promotion Serie 1 |
| Salgueiros | Porto | 4th CP Promotion Serie 1 |
| Lusitano de Évora | Évora | 4th CP Promotion Serie 2 |
| Pevidém | Guimarães | 3rd CP Serie A |
| Rebordosa | Paredes | 3rd CP Serie B |
| União de Santarém | Santarém | 3rd CP Serie C |
| Juventude de Évora | Évora | 3rd CP Serie D |
| Tirsense | Santo Tirso | 4th CP Serie A |
| Beira-Mar | Aveiro | 4th CP Serie B |
| Benfica Castelo Branco | Castelo Branco | 4th CP Serie C |
| Rabo de Peixe | Ribeira Grande | 4th CP Serie D |
| Vila Meã | Amarante | 5th CP Serie A |
| Marítimo B | Funchal | 5th CP Serie B |
| Marinhense | Marinha Grande | 5th CP Serie C |
| Imortal | Albufeira | 5th CP Serie D |
| Vilar de Perdizes | Montalegre | 6th CP Serie A |
| Valadares | Vila Nova de Gaia | 6th CP Serie B |
| Sintrense | Sintra | 6th CP Serie C |
| Fabril | Barreiro | 6th CP Serie D |
| Brito | Brito | 7th CP Serie A |
| Gondomar | Gondomar | 7th CP Serie B |
| Sertanense | Sertã | 7th CP Serie C |
| Vasco da Gama Vidigueira | Vidigueira | 7th CP Serie D |
| Dumiense | Braga | 8th CP Serie A |
| Camacha | Santa Cruz | 8th CP Serie B |
| Mortágua | Mortágua | 8th CP Serie C |
| Serpa | Serpa | 8th CP Serie D |
| Louletano | Loulé | 1st Algarve FA District |
| Lusitânia | Angra do Heroísmo | 1st Azores FA District |
| Florgrade | Cortegaça | 1st Aveiro FA District |
| Ribeirão 1968 | Vila Nova de Famalicão | 1st Braga FA District |
| Mirandela | Mirandela | 1st Bragança FA District |
| Vitória de Sernache | Cernache do Bonjardim | 1st Castelo Branco FA District |
| União 1919 | Coimbra | 1st Coimbra FA District |
| Gouveia | Gouveia | 1st Guarda FA District |
| Peniche | Peniche | 1st Leiria FA District |
| Oriental | Lisbon | 1st Lisbon FA District |
| Portosantense | Porto Santo | 1st Madeira FA District |
| Marco 09 | Marco de Canaveses | 1st Porto FA District |
| União de Tomar | Tomar | 1st Santarém FA District |
| Barreirense | Barreiro | 1st Setúbal FA District |
| Limianos | Ponte de Lima | 1st Viana do Castelo FA District |
| O Elvas | Elvas | 1st Portalegre FA District |
| Vila Real | Vila Real | 1st Vila Real FA District |
| Lamelas | Castro Daire | 1st Viseu FA District |
| Alverca B | Vila Franca de Xira | 2nd Lisbon FA District |
| Oliveira do Douro | Vila Nova de Gaia | 2nd Porto FA District |
| Os Sandinenses | Vila Nova de Famalicão | 2nd Braga FA District Serie 2 |

== Group stage ==
=== Group A ===
| Pos | Team | Pld | W | D | L | GF | GA | GD | Pts | Qualification or relegation | LIM | PEV | TIR | CAM | BRI | DUM | SAN | VLR | MAB | MNT | VIP | PTS | MIR | RIB |
|---|---|---|---|---|---|---|---|---|---|---|---|---|---|---|---|---|---|---|---|---|---|---|---|---|
| 1 | Limianos (Q) | 26 | 12 | 9 | 5 | 35 | 27 | +8 | 45 | Qualification to Promotion play-offs | | 0–0 | 0–3 | 1–2 | 2–0 | 1–1 | 1–1 | 3–1 | 2–1 | 2–3 | 2–1 | 1–0 | 2–0 | 1–2 |
| 2 | Pevidém (Q) | 26 | 11 | 11 | 4 | 31 | 22 | +9 | 44 | Qualification to Promotion play-offs | 2–2 | | 3–1 | 2–0 | 1–2 | 2–1 | 2–2 | 0–0 | 2–1 | 1–1 | 0–0 | 1–0 | 2–1 | 2–1 |
| 3 | Tirsense | 26 | 12 | 7 | 7 | 37 | 24 | +13 | 43 | | 0–1 | 0–0 | | 1–1 | 1–1 | 1–0 | 1–0 | 0–0 | 1–0 | 3–0 | 3–1 | 1–0 | 3–0 | 3–0 |
| 4 | Camacha | 26 | 11 | 5 | 10 | 36 | 30 | +6 | 38 (Note: Ranked on head-to-head: Camacha 3–2 Brito, Brito 0–2 Camacha.) | | 1–2 | 0–1 | 2–1 | | 3–2 | 0–2 | 4–1 | 1–0 | 2–1 | 1–2 | 0–1 | 0–0 | 1–0 | 3–1 |
| 5 | Brito | 26 | 10 | 8 | 8 | 26 | 26 | 0 | 38 | | 1–3 | 1–1 | 2–0 | 0–2 | | 1–0 | 0–0 | 1–0 | 1–1 | 0–0 | 0–2 | 2–1 | 1–0 | 4–0 |
| 6 | Dumiense | 26 | 9 | 8 | 9 | 30 | 32 | −2 | 35 (Note: Ranked on head-to-head points: Dumiense: 12, Sandinenses: 9, Vila Real: 6, Marítimo B: 4.) | | 2–2 | 1–2 | 2–2 | 0–5 | 1–2 | | 1–1 | 2–1 | 2–0 | 1–2 | 1–0 | 3–2 | 0–2 | 1–0 |
| 7 | Os Sandinenses | 26 | 8 | 11 | 7 | 31 | 31 | 0 | 35 | | 0–0 | 0–4 | 2–5 | 0–0 | 1–1 | 1–1 | | 2–1 | 2–1 | 4–0 | 1–1 | 0–1 | 2–0 | 2–0 |
| 8 | Vila Real | 26 | 8 | 11 | 7 | 24 | 22 | +2 | 35 | | 0–0 | 0–1 | 1–0 | 1–0 | 2–0 | 0–0 | 1–1 | | 0–0 | 2–0 | 1–0 | 1–1 | 2–2 | 4–2 |
| 9 | Marítimo B | 26 | 10 | 5 | 11 | 34 | 26 | +8 | 35 | | 2–0 | 3–0 | 1–1 | 1–1 | 0–1 | 0–1 | 1–0 | 1–2 | | 2–1 | 2–0 | 3–1 | 4–0 | 1–2 |
| 10 | Montalegre (R) | 26 | 8 | 10 | 8 | 25 | 31 | −6 | 34 | Relegation to District Championship | 0–1 | 1–1 | 2–1 | 2–0 | 0–0 | 2–1 | 4–2 | 0–0 | 1–3 | | 1–1 | 0–0 | 1–1 | 0–0 |
| 11 | Vilar de Perdizes (R) | 26 | 7 | 10 | 9 | 29 | 32 | −3 | 31 | Relegation to District Championship | 3–3 | 1–1 | 1–2 | 2–1 | 2–1 | 0–0 | 0–2 | 2–2 | 0–2 | 2–1 | | 1–2 | 3–1 | 2–0 |
| 12 | Portosantense (R) | 26 | 6 | 9 | 11 | 22 | 27 | −5 | 27 | Relegation to District Championship | 0–1 | 0–0 | 3–1 | 2–1 | 1–2 | 1–2 | 1–2 | 1–1 | 2–1 | 0–0 | 2–2 | | 0–0 | 0–1 |
| 13 | Mirandela (R) | 26 | 6 | 6 | 14 | 25 | 37 | −12 | 24 | Relegation to District Championship | 0–1 | 1–0 | 1–1 | 2–3 | 2–0 | 1–3 | 0–2 | 0–1 | 1–1 | 2–0 | 0–0 | 0–1 | | 5–2 |
| 14 | Ribeirão 1968 (R) | 26 | 5 | 8 | 13 | 19 | 37 | −18 | 23 | Relegation to District Championship | 1–1 | 2–0 | 0–1 | 2–2 | 0–0 | 1–1 | 0–0 | 2–0 | 0–1 | 0–1 | 0–0 | 0–0 | 0–2 | |

Updated to match(es) played on 7 April 2024. Source: FPF.pt
Legend: Blue = home team win; Yellow = draw; Red = away team win.
Rules for classification: 1) Points, 2) Head-to-head points, 3) Head-to-head goal difference, 4) Goal difference, 5) Matches won, 6) Goals scored
(Q) Qualified for the phase indicated; (R) Relegated

=== Group B ===
| Pos | Team | Pld | W | D | L | GF | GA | GD | Pts | Qualification or relegation | AMA | SJV | GON | MRC | REB | PAR | SAL | VSC | BEI | FLO | ODD | LAM | VGA | VIM |
|---|---|---|---|---|---|---|---|---|---|---|---|---|---|---|---|---|---|---|---|---|---|---|---|---|
| 1 | Amarante (Q) | 26 | 17 | 8 | 1 | 40 | 15 | +25 | 59 | Qualification to Promotion play-offs | | 3–0 | 0–0 | 1–0 | 0–0 | 1–0 | 2–2 | 3–0 | 1–1 | 2–1 | 1–1 | 3–0 | 2–0 | 2–1 |
| 2 | São João de Ver (Q) | 26 | 12 | 9 | 5 | 27 | 18 | +9 | 45 | Qualification to Promotion play-offs | 1–2 | | 2–0 | 1–0 | 1–1 | 1–1 | 1–0 | 0–0 | 1–1 | 0–1 | 2–0 | 2–0 | 4–1 | 2–1 |
| 3 | Gondomar | 26 | 12 | 7 | 7 | 28 | 20 | +8 | 43 | | 0–1 | 2–0 | | 3–0 | 1–2 | 1–1 | 0–0 | 1–1 | 3–2 | 3–1 | 1–0 | 1–0 | 1–2 | 4–2 |
| 4 | Marco 09 | 26 | 11 | 8 | 7 | 29 | 22 | +7 | 41 | | 0–1 | 0–0 | 0–0 | | 2–1 | 1–0 | 0–1 | 3–0 | 2–2 | 2–1 | 2–4 | 1–0 | 3–1 | 1–0 |
| 5 | Rebordosa | 26 | 8 | 12 | 6 | 27 | 23 | +4 | 36 | | 2–2 | 0–2 | 0–0 | 0–2 | | 0–0 | 3–0 | 4–2 | 0–0 | 2–0 | 2–0 | 1–2 | 1–0 | 0–0 |
| 6 | Paredes | 26 | 9 | 8 | 9 | 31 | 25 | +6 | 35 (Note: Ranked on head-to-head points: Salgueiros 0–3 Paredes, Paredes 2–3 Salgueiros.) | | 1–3 | 0–0 | 0–1 | 0–2 | 1–1 | | 2–3 | 2–1 | 2–0 | 1–1 | 1–1 | 1–0 | 3–0 | 1–1 |
| 7 | Salgueiros | 26 | 9 | 8 | 9 | 35 | 26 | +9 | 35 | | 1–1 | 0–0 | 2–0 | 1–1 | 1–1 | 0–3 | | 2–0 | 1–2 | 1–0 | 1–0 | 0–1 | 6–1 | 5–0 |
| 8 | Vitória de Guimarães B | 26 | 8 | 10 | 8 | 35 | 32 | +3 | 34 (Note: Ranked on head-to-head points: Beira-Mar 1–5 Vitória de Guimarães B, Vitória de Guimarães B 2–1 Beira-Mar.) | | 1–1 | 0–2 | 0–2 | 1–1 | 2–0 | 0–2 | 3–1 | | 2–1 | 1–1 | 0–0 | 4–0 | 4–0 | 4–2 |
| 9 | Beira-Mar | 26 | 8 | 10 | 8 | 31 | 31 | 0 | 34 | | 0–1 | 3–0 | 0–0 | 2–1 | 1–3 | 1–0 | 0–0 | 1–5 | | 3–0 | 2–1 | 2–0 | 0–0 | 1–3 |
| 10 | Florgrade (R) | 26 | 8 | 9 | 9 | 24 | 24 | 0 | 33 | Relegation to District Championship | 1–2 | 1–1 | 3–0 | 0–0 | 0–0 | 2–0 | 1–0 | 1–1 | 0–0 | | 0–0 | 0–1 | 1–0 | 1–3 |
| 11 | Oliveira do Douro (R) | 26 | 6 | 8 | 12 | 25 | 33 | −8 | 26 | Relegation to District Championship | 0–1 | 1–1 | 1–0 | 0–1 | 2–2 | 0–2 | 1–1 | 0–0 | 1–3 | 1–2 | | 2–1 | 0–2 | 2–1 |
| 12 | Lamelas (R) | 26 | 7 | 3 | 16 | 19 | 39 | −20 | 24 | Relegation to District Championship | 0–2 | 0–1 | 0–2 | 1–1 | 2–0 | 3–0 | 0–5 | 1–1 | 1–1 | 0–2 | 2–1 | | 1–2 | 2–0 |
| 13 | Valadares Gaia (R) | 26 | 6 | 6 | 14 | 22 | 47 | −25 | 24 | Relegation to District Championship | 2–1 | 0–1 | 0–1 | 1–1 | 0–0 | 1–4 | 1–0 | 0–0 | 1–1 | 0–3 | 1–3 | 2–1 | | 1–2 |
| 14 | Vila Meã (R) | 26 | 6 | 4 | 16 | 27 | 45 | −18 | 22 | Relegation to District Championship | 0–1 | 0–1 | 0–1 | 0–2 | 0–1 | 0–3 | 2–1 | 1–2 | 2–1 | 0–0 | 1–3 | 2–0 | 3–3 | |

Updated to match(es) played on 7 April 2024. Source: FPF.pt
Legend: Blue = home team win; Yellow = draw; Red = away team win.
Rules for classification: 1) Points, 2) Head-to-head points, 3) Head-to-head goal difference, 4) Goal difference, 5) Matches won, 6) Goals scored
(Q) Qualified for the phase indicated; (R) Relegated

=== Group C ===
| Pos | Team | Pld | W | D | L | GF | GA | GD | Pts | Qualification or relegation | USA | LUS | MAR | UDC | BCB | SER | MOR | ALV | PEN | FON | RDP | VTS | GOU | UDT |
|---|---|---|---|---|---|---|---|---|---|---|---|---|---|---|---|---|---|---|---|---|---|---|---|---|
| 1 | União Santarém (Q) | 26 | 17 | 4 | 5 | 52 | 23 | +29 | 55 | Qualification to Promotion play-offs | | 2–1 | 0–0 | 2–1 | 4–1 | 2–0 | 3–0 | 3–1 | 0–1 | 2–1 | 2–1 | 3–0 | 2–2 | 3–0 |
| 2 | Lusitânia (Q) | 26 | 15 | 6 | 5 | 40 | 22 | +18 | 51 | Qualification to Promotion play-offs | 3–1 | | 2–1 | 1–0 | 3–1 | 3–1 | 2–3 | 1–0 | 1–0 | 0–0 | 2–0 | 1–0 | 0–0 | 1–0 |
| 3 | Marinhense | 26 | 15 | 5 | 6 | 43 | 26 | +17 | 50 | | 2–4 | 2–0 | | 0–1 | 4–3 | 1–0 | 2–0 | 2–1 | 3–0 | 3–1 | 1–0 | 2–1 | 6–3 | 5–1 |
| 4 | União 1919 | 26 | 11 | 5 | 10 | 30 | 26 | +4 | 38 | | 1–0 | 2–1 | 1–1 | | 2–1 | 2–0 | 1–1 | 1–2 | 0–1 | 2–0 | 1–2 | 2–0 | 1–0 | 2–1 |
| 5 | Benfica Castelo Branco | 26 | 10 | 7 | 9 | 34 | 29 | +5 | 37 (Note: Ranked on head-to-head points: Benfica Castelo Branco: 14, Sertanense: 11, Mortágua: 10, Alverca: 9, Peniche: 9.) | | 0–0 | 4–1 | 2–0 | 0–0 | | 1–1 | 2–0 | 0–0 | 2–0 | 2–0 | 1–2 | 3–0 | 3–2 | 2–1 |
| 6 | Sertanense | 26 | 10 | 7 | 9 | 26 | 25 | +1 | 37 | | 0–0 | 0–0 | 1–1 | 0–1 | 1–2 | | 4–3 | 0–0 | 1–0 | 0–0 | 3–2 | 0–0 | 2–1 | 2–1 |
| 7 | Mortágua | 26 | 10 | 7 | 9 | 30 | 36 | −6 | 37 | | 0–4 | 1–2 | 2–1 | 0–1 | 1–2 | 2–1 | | 0–0 | 2–0 | 1–0 | 2–1 | 1–1 | 3–2 | 1–0 |
| 8 | Alverca B | 26 | 10 | 7 | 9 | 32 | 20 | +12 | 37 | | 3–1 | 0–0 | 0–1 | 0–0 | 1–0 | 0–1 | 1–2 | | 7–0 | 0–1 | 2–1 | 0–1 | 3–1 | 5–1 |
| 9 | Peniche | 26 | 11 | 4 | 11 | 28 | 39 | −11 | 37 | | 1–3 | 1–4 | 0–1 | 2–1 | 2–0 | 2–1 | 3–1 | 0–2 | | 1–1 | 1–1 | 2–0 | 0–3 | 2–2 |
| 10 | Fontinhas (R) | 26 | 9 | 5 | 12 | 23 | 32 | −9 | 32 | Relegation to District Championship | 3–2 | 0–2 | 1–1 | 3–2 | 2–1 | 0–2 | 0–0 | 0–1 | 0–1 | | 0–2 | 2–0 | 2–0 | 2–0 |
| 11 | Rabo de Peixe (R) | 26 | 8 | 7 | 11 | 31 | 32 | −1 | 31 | Relegation to District Championship | 0–1 | 3–2 | 1–1 | 2–0 | 0–0 | 0–2 | 1–1 | 1–1 | 0–0 | 0–1 | | 0–1 | 2–1 | 4–2 |
| 12 | Vitória de Sernache (R) | 26 | 5 | 10 | 11 | 17 | 30 | −13 | 25 | Relegation to District Championship | 0–2 | 0–0 | 0–2 | 1–1 | 1–1 | 1–0 | 1–1 | 0–0 | 0–1 | 4–1 | 0–0 | | 1–1 | 2–2 |
| 13 | Gouveia (R) | 26 | 5 | 6 | 15 | 35 | 48 | −13 | 21 | Relegation to District Championship | 1–4 | 2–2 | 0–1 | 1–5 | 0–0 | 0–1 | 1–1 | 1–2 | 1–3 | 3–1 | 4–1 | 1–2 | | 2–0 |
| 14 | União de Tomar (R) | 26 | 5 | 2 | 19 | 20 | 53 | −33 | 17 | Relegation to District Championship | 0–2 | 1–3 | 1–0 | 2–1 | 1–0 | 0–2 | 0–1 | 1–0 | 2–4 | 0–1 | 0–4 | 1–0 | 0–2 | |

Updated to match(es) played on 7 April 2024. Source: FPF.pt
Legend: Blue = home team win; Yellow = draw; Red = away team win.
Rules for classification: 1) Points, 2) Head-to-head points, 3) Head-to-head goal difference, 4) Goal difference, 5) Matches won, 6) Goals scored
(Q) Qualified for the phase indicated; (R) Relegated

=== Group D ===
| Pos | Team | Pld | W | D | L | GF | GA | GD | Pts | Qualification or relegation | VFC | MNC | LUE | LOU | SIN | ELV | BAR | FAB | SER | JUE | VGV | ORI | REA | IMO |
|---|---|---|---|---|---|---|---|---|---|---|---|---|---|---|---|---|---|---|---|---|---|---|---|---|
| 1 | Vitória de Setúbal (Q) | 26 | 16 | 5 | 5 | 45 | 21 | +24 | 53 | Qualification to Promotion play-offs | | 1–2 | 0–1 | 2–1 | 2–0 | 1–2 | 4–0 | 1–1 | 3–2 | 3–0 | 4–0 | 2–0 | 2–0 | 2–1 |
| 2 | Moncarapachense (Q) | 26 | 14 | 7 | 5 | 29 | 17 | +12 | 49 | Qualification to Promotion play-offs | 0–1 | | 0–0 | 2–1 | 0–0 | 2–1 | 1–1 | 1–0 | 1–1 | 0–2 | 0–0 | 5–1 | 1–0 | 3–0 |
| 3 | Lusitano Évora | 26 | 11 | 13 | 2 | 28 | 9 | +19 | 46 | | 0–1 | 0–0 | | 1–1 | 0–0 | 1–1 | 2–1 | 0–0 | 0–1 | 0–0 | 4–0 | 2–0 | 1–1 | 3–0 |
| 4 | Louletano | 26 | 11 | 8 | 7 | 37 | 26 | +11 | 41 | | 2–1 | 0–1 | 0–1 | | 3–1 | 1–1 | 0–0 | 1–2 | 3–1 | 2–1 | 2–1 | 4–1 | 3–0 | 1–1 |
| 5 | Sintrense | 26 | 10 | 10 | 6 | 29 | 26 | +3 | 40 | | 1–1 | 1–2 | 0–0 | 1–1 | | 0–1 | 2–1 | 1–1 | 2–1 | 1–0 | 2–1 | 2–2 | 1–0 | 1–1 |
| 6 | O Elvas | 26 | 10 | 9 | 7 | 34 | 27 | +7 | 39 (Note: Ranked on head-to-head: Fabril 3–0 Serpa, Serpa 1–0 Fabril.) | | 2–1 | 0–1 | 1–1 | 1–1 | 1–1 | | 0–1 | 2–2 | 1–0 | 0–0 | 1–1 | 1–1 | 2–0 | 2–1 |
| 7 | Barreirense | 26 | 11 | 6 | 9 | 31 | 25 | +6 | 39 | | 0–1 | 0–1 | 0–0 | 0–0 | 2–0 | 0–2 | | 1–0 | 1–2 | 1–2 | 1–1 | 2–2 | 4–1 | 2–0 |
| 8 | Fabril do Barreiro | 26 | 8 | 10 | 8 | 29 | 24 | +5 | 34 (Note: Ranked on head-to-head: O Elvas 0–1 Barreirense, Barreirense 0–2 O Elvas.) | | 0–1 | 2–0 | 0–1 | 1–1 | 2–1 | 2–1 | 0–1 | | 3–0 | 2–1 | 3–0 | 2–2 | 2–1 | 0–1 |
| 9 | Serpa | 26 | 10 | 4 | 12 | 27 | 30 | −3 | 34 | | 0–1 | 2–1 | 0–0 | 2–1 | 2–2 | 0–1 | 0–1 | 1–0 | | 1–0 | 1–2 | 0–1 | 2–2 | 2–0 |
| 10 | Juventude Évora (R) | 26 | 8 | 8 | 10 | 26 | 25 | +1 | 32 | Relegation to District Championship | 1–1 | 2–0 | 0–0 | 0–1 | 1–3 | 1–2 | 0–1 | 0–0 | 2–0 | | 2–2 | 0–0 | 2–1 | 1–2 |
| 11 | Vasco da Gama Vidigueira (R) | 26 | 8 | 6 | 12 | 26 | 45 | −19 | 30 | Relegation to District Championship | 0–0 | 0–1 | 0–4 | 3–2 | 1–2 | 0–3 | 2–1 | 1–1 | 1–0 | 0–2 | | 1–1 | 1–0 | 2–0 |
| 12 | Oriental (R) | 26 | 7 | 8 | 11 | 31 | 48 | −17 | 29 | Relegation to District Championship | 3–3 | 1–1 | 2–3 | 0–2 | 0–1 | 2–1 | 0–4 | 1–0 | 0–3 | 1–3 | 4–1 | | 1–0 | 3–2 |
| 13 | Real SC (R) | 26 | 3 | 5 | 18 | 24 | 46 | −22 | 14 | Relegation to District Championship | 2–3 | 0–2 | 0–2 | 0–1 | 0–3 | 3–2 | 1–2 | 3–3 | 0–1 | 0–2 | 3–2 | 2–0 | | 2–2 |
| 14 | Imortal (R) | 26 | 2 | 7 | 17 | 19 | 46 | −27 | 13 | Relegation to District Championship | 0–3 | 0–1 | 0–1 | 1–2 | 0–2 | 2–2 | 1–3 | 0–0 | 1–2 | 1–1 | 1–2 | 0–2 | 1–1 | |

Updated to match(es) played on 24 March 2024. Source: FPF.pt
Legend: Blue = home team win; Yellow = draw; Red = away team win.
Rules for classification: 1) Points, 2) Head-to-head points, 3) Head-to-head goal difference, 4) Goal difference, 5) Matches won, 6) Goals scored
(Q) Qualified for the phase indicated; (R) Relegated

== Promotion play-offs ==
=== Serie 1 ===
| Pos | Team | Pld | W | D | L | GF | GA | GD | Pts | Qualification | AMA | SJV | LIM | PEV |
|---|---|---|---|---|---|---|---|---|---|---|---|---|---|---|
| 1 | Amarante (P) | 6 | 4 | 1 | 1 | 9 | 4 | +5 | 13 | Promotion to Liga 3 | | 2–1 | 2–3 | 2–0 |
| 2 | São João de Ver (P) | 6 | 3 | 1 | 2 | 10 | 9 | +1 | 10 (Note: Ranked on head-to-head points: Limianos 2–2 São João de Ver, São João de Ver 2–1 Limianos.) | Promotion to Liga 3 | 0–1 | | 2–1 | 2–1 |
| 3 | Limianos | 6 | 3 | 1 | 2 | 9 | 9 | 0 | 10 | | 0–2 | 2–2 | | 2–1 |
| 4 | Pevidém | 6 | 0 | 1 | 5 | 4 | 10 | −6 | 1 | | 0–0 | 2–3 | 1–0 | |

Updated to match(es) played on 25 May 2024. Source: fpf.pt
Legend: Blue = home team win; Yellow = draw; Red = away team win.
Rules for classification: 1) points, 2) head-to-head points, 3) head-to-head goal difference, 4) goal difference, 5) matches won, 6) goals scored
(P) Promoted

=== Serie 2 ===
| Pos | Team | Pld | W | D | L | GF | GA | GD | Pts | Qualification | VFC | LUS | USA | MNC |
|---|---|---|---|---|---|---|---|---|---|---|---|---|---|---|
| 1 | Vitória de Setúbal (R) | 6 | 4 | 1 | 1 | 9 | 5 | +4 | 13 (Note: Ranked on head-to-head: Vitória de Setúbal 3–1 Lusitânia, Lusitânia 2–1 Vitória de Setúbal.) | Relegation to District Championship (Note: Vitória de Setúbal failed to produce valid licensing documentation to compete in the 2024–25 seasons of Liga 3 and Campeonato de Portugal, so they chose to participate in the Setúbal FA Second division instead. As a result, União Santarém (3rd place) were invited to participate in the third tier for the 2024–25 season.) | | 3–1 | 2–1 | 1–0 |
| 2 | Lusitânia (P) | 6 | 4 | 1 | 1 | 10 | 6 | +4 | 13 | Promotion to Liga 3 | 2–1 | | 3–1 | 2–0 |
| 3 | União Santarém (P) | 6 | 1 | 2 | 3 | 5 | 8 | −3 | 5 | Promotion to Liga 3 | 0–0 | 1–1 | | 2–1 |
| 4 | Moncarapachense | 6 | 1 | 0 | 5 | 3 | 8 | −5 | 3 | | 1–2 | 0–1 | 1–0 | |

Updated to match(es) played on 1 June 2024. Source: fpf.pt
Legend: Blue = home team win; Yellow = draw; Red = away team win.
Rules for classification: 1) points, 2) head-to-head points, 3) head-to-head goal difference, 4) goal difference, 5) matches won, 6) goals scored
(P) Promoted; (R) Relegated

== Third stage ==
=== Championship final ===
24 June 2024
16:00

| Vitória de Setúbal | 0–3 | Amarante |
|---|---|---|
| | Report | Elias Franco 28'; Miguel Barandas 37', 90+5' |

Estádio Nacional, Oeiras
