= List of football clubs in Portugal =

This is a list of association football clubs based in Portugal, sorted by league and division within the Portuguese football league system, as of the 2025–26 season. A total of 112 teams compete in the top four tiers of the Portuguese football pyramid, divided as follows:

- Liga Portugal (top tier with 18 teams, fully professional)
- Liga Portugal 2 (second tier with 18 teams, fully professional)
- Liga 3 (third tier with 20 teams into two groups of 10 teams, semi-professional)
- Campeonato de Portugal (fourth tier with 56 teams into four groups of 14 teams, amateur)

The Portuguese football leagues are divided into divisions (divisões, singular – divisão). The top teams play in the Liga Portugal, named Liga Portugal Betclic for sponsorship reasons. The second teams play in the Liga Portugal 2, named Liga Portugal 2 Meu Super for sponsorship reasons. In each division, with rare exceptions, a team plays all other teams twice, once at home and once away. One can divide the competitions in professional and non-professional.

The Portuguese league and federation teams compete in Europe under UEFA, most notably in the UEFA Champions League, but also in the UEFA Cup, in the extinct Cup Winners' Cup and sometimes in the UEFA Intertoto Cup, European Super Cup and the extinct UEFA/Conmebol Intercontinental Cup (Toyota Cup). They can also compete in the FIFA Club World Cup, although until today no Portuguese team reached this recent competition. The teams also compete in a domestic cup competition each year, called Cup of Portugal (Taça de Portugal) and the winners play against the champions in the SuperCup Cândido de Oliveira.

== Current hierarchical divisional breakdowns ==
- Professional
  - Liga Portugal - First Division (18 teams)
  - Liga Portugal 2 - Second Division (18 teams)
- Semi-professional
  - Liga 3 - Third Division (20 teams in 2 groups of 10 teams)
- Non-professional
  - Campeonato de Portugal - Fourth Division (56 teams in 4 groups of 16 teams)
  - Portuguese District First Levels - Fifth Division
  - Portuguese District Second Levels - Sixth Division
  - Portuguese District Third Levels - Seventh Division
  - Portuguese District Fourth Levels - Eighth Division

== Liga Portugal Betclic ==
Club	City	District FA
AFS	Aves, Santo Tirso	Porto
Alverca	Alverca do Ribatejo	Lisbon
Arouca	Arouca	Aveiro
Benfica	Lisbon	Lisbon
Braga	Braga	Braga
Casa Pia	Lisbon	Lisbon
Chaves	Chaves	Vila Real
Estoril Praia	Estoril, Cascais	Lisbon
Famalicão	Vila Nova de Famalicão	Braga
Gil Vicente	Barcelos	Braga
Moreirense	Moreira de Cónegos, Guimarães	Braga
Nacional	Funchal, Madeira	Madeira
Porto	Porto	Porto
Rio Ave	Vila do Conde	Porto
Santa Clara	Ponta Delgada, Azores	Ponta Delgada
Sporting CP	Lisbon	Lisbon
Tondela	Tondela	Viseu
Vitória SC	Guimarães	Braga

== Liga Portugal 2 Meu Super ==
Club	City	District FA
Académico de Viseu	Viseu	Viseu
Benfica B	Lisbon	Lisbon
Boavista	Porto	Porto
Chaves	Chaves	Vila Real
Farense	Faro	Algarve
Feirense	Santa Maria da Feira	Aveiro
Felgueiras	Felgueiras	Porto
Leixões	Matosinhos	Porto
Lusitânia Lourosa	Lourosa	Aveiro
Marítimo	Funchal, Madeira	Madeira
Paços de Ferreira	Paços de Ferreira	Porto
Penafiel	Penafiel	Porto
Portimonense	Portimão	Algarve
Porto B	Porto	Porto
Sporting CP B	Lisbon	Lisbon
Torreense	Torres Vedras	Lisbon
União de Leiria	Leiria	Leiria
Vizela	Vizela	Braga

== Liga 3 ==
=== Série A ===
Club	City	District FA
Amarante	Amarante	Porto
Braga B	Braga	Braga
Fafe	Fafe	Braga
Oliveirense	Oliveira de Azeméis	Aveiro
Paredes	Paredes	Porto
Sanjoanense	São João da Madeira	Aveiro
São João de Ver	São João de Ver	Aveiro
Trofense	Trofa	Porto
Varzim	Póvoa de Varzim	Porto
Vitória SC B	Guimarães	Braga

=== Série B ===
Club	City	District FA
1° Dezembro	Sintra	Lisbon
Académica	Coimbra	Coimbra
Amora	Amora	Setubal
Atlético CP	Lisbon	Lisbon
Belenenses	Lisbon	Lisbon
Caldas	Caldas da Rainha	Leiria
Lusitano Évora	Évora	Évora
Mafra	Mafra	Lisbon
Sporting Covilhã	Covilhã	Castelo Branco
União de Santarém	Santarém	Santarém

== Campeonato de Portugal ==
=== Serie A ===
Club	City	District FA
Aparecida	Torno	Porto
Bragança	Bragança	Bragança
Brito	Brito	Braga
Celoricense	Celorico de Basto	Braga
Chaves B	Chaves	Vila Real
Desportivo de Monção	Monção	Viana do Castelo
Leça	Leça da Palmeira	Porto
Mirandela	Mirandela	Bragança
Os Limianos	Ponte de Lima	Viana do Castelo
Rebordosa AC	Rebordosa	Porto
Tirsense	Santo Tirso	Porto
Vianense	Viana do Castelo	Viana do Castelo
Vilaverdense	Vila Verde	Braga
Vila Real	Vila Real	Vila Real

=== Serie B ===
Club	City	District FA
Alpendorada	Alpendorada	Porto
Anadia FC	Anadia	Aveiro
Beira-Mar	Aveiro	Aveiro
Camacha	Santa Cruz	Madeira
Cinfães	Cinfães	Viseu
Florgrade	Ovar	Aveiro
Gouveia	Gouveia	Guarda
Machico	Machico	Madeira
Marco 09	Marco de Canaveses	Porto
Mortágua	Mortágua	Viseu
Resende	Resende	Viseu
Ribeira Brava	Ribeira Brava	Madeira
Salgueiros	Porto	Porto
União de Lamas	Santa Maria de Lamas	Aveiro

=== Serie C ===
Club	City	District FA
Alverca B	Alverca do Ribatejo	Lisbon
Arronches Benfica	Arronches	Portalegre
Atlético Malveira	Mafra	Lisbon
Benfica Castelo Branco	Castelo Branco	Castelo Branco
Eléctrico	Ponte de Sor	Portalegre
Fátima	Fátima	Santarém
Marialvas	Cantanhede	Coimbra
Marinhense	Marinha Grande	Leiria
Naval 1893	Figueira da Foz	Coimbra
Oliveira do Hospital	Oliveira do Hospital	Coimbra
Peniche	Peniche	Leiria
Samora Correia	Samora Correia	Santarém
União Serra	Santa Catarina da Serra	Leiria
Vitória Sernache	Sertã	Castelo Branco

=== Serie D ===
Club	City	District FA
Alcochetense	Alcochete	Setúbal
Comércio e Indústria	Setúbal	Setúbal
O Elvas	Elvas	Portalegre
Juventude Évora	Évora	Évora
Lagoa	Lagoa	Algarve
Lajense	Lajes	Horta
Louletano	Loulé	Algarve
Lusitânia	Angra do Heroísmo	Angra do Heroísmo
Moncarapachense	Moncarapacho	Algarve
Oriental Lisbon	Lisbon	Lisbon
Portimonense B	Portimão	Algarve
Serpa	Serpa	Beja
Sintrense	Sintra	Lisbon
Vasco da Gama Vidigueira	Vidigueira	Beja

== Notable extinct teams ==
- Riopele
- União de Lisboa
- Vilafranquense

== See also ==
- Portuguese football competitions
- Football in Portugal
- Portuguese Footballer of the Year
