= Portuguese District Championships =

This is a list of the Portuguese football District championships.

5	Portuguese District First Levels				
5	Viana do Castelo FA First Division (District league); 16 clubs	Braga FA Pro-National Division (District league); 18 clubs	Bragança FA Division of Honour (District league); 14 clubs	Vila Real FA Division of Honour (District league); 14 clubs	Porto FA Elite Division (District league); 20 clubs
5	Aveiro FA First Division (District league); 18 clubs	Viseu FA Division of Honour (District league); 16 clubs	Guarda FA First Division (District league); 14 clubs	Coimbra FA Division of Honour (District league); 16 clubs	Leiria FA Division of Honour (District league); 16 clubs
5	Castelo Branco FA First Division (District league); 10 clubs	Portalegre FA First Division (District league); 10 clubs	Santarém FA First Division (District league); 14 clubs	Lisbon FA Pró-National Division (District league); 16 clubs	Setúbal FA First Division (District league); 16 clubs
5	Évora FA Elite Division (District league); 12 clubs	Beja FA First Division (District league); 14 clubs	Algarve FA First Division (District league); 18 clubs	Madeira FA First Division (District league); 12 clubs	Liga Meo Azores (Regional league); 10 clubs

6	Portuguese District Second Levels					
6	Viana do Castelo FA Second Division (District league); 16 clubs	Braga FA Honour Division (Series A and B) (District league); 32 clubs	Porto FA Honour Division (District league); 18 clubs	Aveiro FA Second Division (Series A, B and C) (District league); 45 clubs	Viseu FA First Division (North and South Zones) (District league); 23 clubs	Guarda FA Second Division (District league); 7 clubs
6	Coimbra FA First Division (District league); 16 clubs	Leiria FA First Division (A, B and C Zones)(District league); 26 clubs	Santarém FA Second Division (Series 1 and 2) (District league); 20 clubs	Lisbon FA Honour Division (District league); 16 clubs	Setúbal FA Second Division (A and B Zones) (District league); 8 clubs	Évora FA Honour Division (District league); 10 clubs
6	Beja FA Second Division (Series A and B) (District league); 17 clubs	Madeira FA Second Division (District league); 8 clubs	Ponta Delgada FA São Miguel First Division (District league); 9 clubs	Horta FA Pico/Faial League (District league); 5 clubs(2013-14)	Angra do Heroísmo FA Regional League	
6	Beja FA Second Division (Series A and B) (District league); 17 clubs	Madeira FA Second Division (District league); 8 clubs	Ponta Delgada FA São Miguel First Division (District league); 9 clubs	Horta FA Pico/Faial League (District league); 5 clubs(2013-14)	Angra do Heroísmo FA São Jorge League (District league); 4 clubs(2013-14)	Angra do Heroísmo FA Terceira League (District league); 6 clubs(2013-14)

7	Portuguese District Third Levels			
7	Braga FA First Division (Series A, B, C, D and E) (District league); 66 clubs	Porto FA First Division (Series 1 and 2) (District league); 32 clubs	Lisbon FA First Division (Series 1, 2 and 3) (District league); 39 clubs	Aveiro FA Second Division (Zone North and South) (District league); 26 clubs

8	Portuguese District Fourth Levels
8	Porto FA Second Division (Series 1, 2 and 3) (District league) 49 clubs

== See also ==
- List of association football competitions in Portugal
- Portuguese football competitions
