= Alfaia (footballer) =

Portuguese footballer

Personal information
- Full name: Nélson Moreira de Lemos Alfaia
- Date of birth: 9 November 1966 (age 59)
- Place of birth: Dili, Portuguese Timor
- Height: 1.82 m (6 ft 0 in)
- Position: Defender

Youth career
- Estrela Portalegre

Senior career*
Years	Team	Apps	(Gls)
1985–1986	Estrela Portalegre		
1986–1987	Campomaiorense		
1987–1988	Portalegrense		
1988–1990	O Elvas		
1990–1991	Académica		
1991–1992	Rio Ave		
1992–1993	O Elvas		
1993–2000	Leça		
2001–2002	O Elvas		
- * Club domestic league appearances and goals

Nélson Moreira de Lemos Alfaia (born 9 November 1966) is a retired Portuguese football defender.
