= C.U. Idanhense =

Portuguese sports club

- Full name: Clube União Idanhense
- Founded: 1917
- Ground: Estádio Municipal de Idanha-a-Nova, Idanha-a-Nova
- Capacity: 3,000
- League: Portuguese District Championships
- 2021–22: Campeonato de Portugal, relegated
Home colours	Away colours	Third colours

Clube União Idanhense is a Portuguese sports club from Idanha-a-Nova.

The men's football team plays in the Portuguese District Championships, the fifth tier of Portuguese football. The team was promoted to the fourth-tier Campeonato de Portugal league after winning the 2020–21 I Divisão AF Castelo Branco, but was relegated after just one season. The team enjoyed spells on the old fourth tier, the Terceira Divisão, in 1999–2000 and 2003 to 2007.
