= Angra do Heroísmo Football Association =

Football club in the Azores

Football Association of Angra do Heroísmo
- Abbreviation: AF Angra do Heroísmo
- Formation: 4 August 1921; 105 years ago
- Type: NGO
- Legal status: Foundation
- Purpose: Football Association
- Headquarters: Rua Recreio dos Artistas, 35-293
- Location: Angra Heroísmo (Azores), Portugal
- Region served: Terceira, São Jorge, Graciosa
- Official language: Portuguese
- President: Nuno Duarte Pamplona Maciel
- Vice-President: José Vieira Félix
- Vice-President: Roldão Jacinto Coelho Duarte
- Assembly President: Roldão Jacinto Coelho Duarte
- Parent organization: Portuguese Football Federation
- Website: www.afah.pt
- Formerly called: Associação de Futebol de Angra do Heroísmo

The Angra do Heroísmo Football Association (Portuguese: Associação de Futebol de Angra do Heroísmo) is one of the 22 District Football Associations that are affiliated with the Portuguese Football Federation. The AF Angra do Heroísmo administers lower-tier football in the municipalities on the islands of Terceira, São Jorge, and Graciosa, within the Portuguese archipelago of the Azores.

== Background ==
The association, commonly abbreviated as the AF Angra do Heroísmo, is the governing body for football in the former Portuguese district of Angra do Heroísmo. Established in 1921, the Association, which is seated in the municipality of Angra do Heroísmo, on the island of Terceira, regulates football in the three Azorean islands of Terceira, São Jorge, and Graciosa.

== Competitions ==
Clubs within the Association compete in two of the three levels of the national Portuguese football league in competitions run by the Portuguese Football Federation (Campeonato Nacional de Seniores). In 2013-14, the highest ranked club was Sport Clube Praiense which competed in the Campeonato Nacional de Seniores (the third-tier of the league system).

Below the Campeonato Nacional de Seniores the competitions are organised by districts (known in Portuguese as Distritais) with each District Association organising its competitions according to geography and other factors. Consequently, the AF Angra do Heroísmo runs three island championships for the islands of Terceira, São Jorge, and Graciosa.

In addition, the AF Angra do Heroísmo organizes District Championships for football and Futsal for men and women for all age groups including Senior, Junior, Youth, Beginners, Infants and Schools.

== Notable clubs affiliated to AF Angra do Heroísmo ==
Primeira Liga (tier 1)

- None

Liga de Honra (tier 2)

- None

Campeonato Nacional de Seniores (tier 3)

- Sport Clube Praiense

Distritais (tier 4)

- Sporting Clube de Guadalupe
- Sport Clube Lusitânia
- Sport Clube Angrense

== Current Divisions - 2023–24 Season ==
The AF Angra do Heroísmo run the following three island championships covering the sixth tier of the Portuguese football league system.

=== Ilha Graciosa ===
- Graciosa Futebol Clube
- Sport Clube Marítimo (Graciosa)

=== Ilha São Jorge ===
- Futebol Clube da Calheta
- Grupo Desportivo Beira
- Grupo Desportivo Velense

=== Ilha Terceira ===
- Sport Clube Barreiro
- Sport Clube Vilanovense

== Former participants ==
Other clubs that have competed in the Distritais since the 1992/93 season include:

=== Ilha Graciosa ===
- Grupo Desportivo Mocidade Praiense

=== Ilha São Jorge ===
- Grupo Desportivo Beira
- Grupo Desportivo Topo

=== Ilha Terceira ===
- Carioca Futebol Club
- Clube Desportivo de Belém
- Clube Desportivo Praia
- Grupo Desportivo Casa Povo 4 Ribeiras
- Grupo Desportivo Recreativo Agualva
- Sport Clube Barbarense
- Sporting Clube Os Leões
- União Desportiva Praiense
- União Sebastianense Futebol Clube

== List of member clubs ==
| Abbreviation | Settlement (Island) | Official Name | Division (tier) | Cup | Other information |
|---|---|---|---|---|---|
| Angrense | Angra do Heroísmo (Terceira) | Sport Clube Angrense | Segunda Divisão (3) | * * | |
| Barreiro | Porto Judeu, Angra do Heroísmo (Terceira) | Sport Clube Barreiro | Distritais (5) | * | |
| Belém | Terra Chã, Angra do Heroísmo (Terceira) | Clube Desportivo de Belém | Distritais (F) | None | |
| Boavista Ribeirinha | Ribeirinha, Angra do Heroísmo (Terceira) | Boavista Clube da Ribeirinha | Distritais (5) | * | |
| FC Calheta | Calheta (São Jorge) | Futebol Clube da Calheta | Distritais (5) | None | |
| FC Urzelinense | Urzelina (São Jorge) | Futebol Clube Urzelinense | Distritais (5) | None | |
| Fontinhas | Fontinhas, Praia da Vitória (Terceira) | Grupo Desportivo das Fontinhas | Distritais (5) | None | |
| GD Beira | Velas (São Jorge) | Grupo Desportivo Beira | Distritais (F) | * | |
| Graciosa FC | Santa Cruz da Graciosa (Graciosa) | Graciosa Futebol Clube | Distritais (5) | * | |
| Guadalupe | Guadalupe (Graciosa) | Sporting Clube de Guadalupe | Terceira Divisão (4) | * | |
| Lajense | Praia da Vitória (Terceira) | Juventude Desportiva Lajense | Distritais (5) | * | |
| Lusitânia | Angra do Heroísmo (Terceira) | Sport Clube Lusitânia | Terceira Divisão (4) | * * | |
| Luzense | Luz, Santa Cruz da Graciosa (Graciosa) | Grupo Desportivo Luzense | Distritais (5) | None | |
| Marítimo Graciosa | Santa Cruz da Graciosa (Graciosa) | Sport Clube Marítimo (Graciosa) | Distritais (5) | * * | |
| Maritimo Velense | Velas (São Jorge) | Futebol Clube Marítimo Velense | Distritais (5) | * | |
| Os Marítimos | São Mateus da Calheta, Angra do Heroismo (Terceira) | Os Marítimos de São Mateus Sport Clube | Distritais (5) | None | |
| SC Os Leões | Porto Judeu, Angra do Heroísmo (Terceira) | Sporting Clube Os Leões | Distritais (F) | * | |
| Praiense | Praia da Vitória (Terceira) | Sport Clube Praiense | Terceira Divisão (4) | * * | |
| SC Vilanovense | Vila Nova, Praia da Vitória (Terceira) | Sport Clube Vilanovense | Distritais (5) | * | |
| Velense | Velas (São Jorge) | Grupo Desportivo Velense | Distritais (5) | * | |

Footnote

- 1-10 games in Portuguese Cup. *
- 11-100 games in Portuguese Cup. * *
- 101+ games in Portuguese Cup. * * *

== See also ==
- Portuguese District Football Associations
- Portuguese football competitions
- List of football clubs in Portugal
