= Portuguese district football associations =

There are 22 district football associations in Portugal. These organizations are the governing bodies (alongside the Portuguese Football Federation) of football in each Portuguese district.

== Overview ==
Until the reform of Portuguese football in 1948, all clubs in a given district had to participate in the district championship, even those in Primeira Liga and Segunda Divisão; after 1948, a Terceira Divisão was established for transition between the district championship and national leagues and the top-level clubs no longer had to play in their district championship (the arrangement did not include clubs from the Azores and Madeira, which did not reach the top division until the 1970s).

With the reform of Portuguese Football League system in 2013, the Campeonato Nacional de Seniores became the Portuguese third-level football league, making the principal district championship the fourth-level leagues.

While the three districts in which the Azores were divided pre-autonomy were abolished, the district football associations haven't merged, and still exist as separate entities. Nevertheless, beginning in 2013, their clubs compete in a unified Azores league before joining the Campeonato Nacional de Seniores.

== List of district associations ==
Map showing the Portuguese municipalities arranged by their respective district football associations

The 22 DFAs are:

1. Associação de Futebol do Algarve (for the district of Faro)
2. Associação de Futebol de Angra do Heroísmo (former Azorean district of Angra do Heroísmo)
3. Associação de Futebol de Aveiro (district of Aveiro)
4. Associação de Futebol de Beja (district of Beja)
5. Associação de Futebol de Braga (district of Braga)
6. Associação de Futebol de Bragança (district of Bragança)
7. Associação de Futebol de Castelo Branco (district of Castelo Branco)
8. Associação de Futebol de Coimbra (district of Coimbra)
9. Associação de Futebol de Évora (district of Évora)
10. Associação de Futebol da Guarda (district of Guarda)
11. Associação de Futebol da Horta (former Azorean district of Horta)
12. Associação de Futebol de Leiria (district of Leiria)
13. Associação de Futebol de Lisboa (district of Lisbon)
14. Associação de Futebol da Madeira (former Madeiran district of Funchal)
15. Associação de Futebol de Ponta Delgada (former Azorean district of Ponta Delgada)
16. Associação de Futebol de Portalegre (district of Portalegre)
17. Associação de Futebol do Porto (district of Porto)
18. Associação de Futebol de Santarém (district of Santarém)
19. Associação de Futebol de Setúbal (district of Setúbal)
20. Associação de Futebol de Viana do Castelo (district of Viana do Castelo)
21. Associação de Futebol de Vila Real (district of Vila Real)
22. Associação de Futebol de Viseu (district of Viseu)

Note: "Associação de Futebol de/do/da" means "football association of"

Angra do Heroísmo, Beja, Bragança, Guarda, Horta and Viana do Castelo have never had representation in the top level.

== See also ==
- Brazilian Football State Championships, a similar system that took root in Portugal's former colony Brazil and endures due to Brazil's larger size.
