= O Elvas C.A.D. =

Portuguese football club

O Elvas CAD
- Full name: O Elvas Clube Alentejano de Desportos
- Nickname: Cavaleiros
- Founded: 15 August 1947; 79 years ago
- Ground: Estádio Patalino
- Capacity: 6,200
- Chairman: Vincenzo Caci (SAD), João Pedro Ruas (Club)
- Coach: Bruno Dias
- League: Campeonato de Portugal
- 2024–25: Campeonato de Portugal, Group C Champions
- Website: oelvassad.com
Home colours	Away colours

"O Elvas" Clube Alentejano de Desportos, also known as "O Elvas", is a Portuguese club with a large lineup of young players and legends of Portuguese and Alentejo football, based in the city of Elvas, District of Portalegre, in Alentejo. It is one of the historic cities of Alentejo and Portugal, founded on August 15, 1947.

Throughout its history, O Elvas CAD has gone through ups and downs, facing financial and sporting challenges. However, the club has always remained faithful to its mission of promoting sport and valuing the culture and tradition of Alentejo.

The club's colors are blue and gold (yellow), the club is nicknamed Cavaleiros Azuis e Ouro (Blue & Gold Knights), its fans are called Elvenses.

== History ==
The club was founded on August 15, 1947, from the merger of "Sport Lisboa e Elvas" with "Sporting Clube Elvense", clubs that were branches of Sport Lisboa e Benfica and Sporting Clube de Portugal respectively. The union between the two clubs from Elvas was fundamentally due to the lack of interest shown by the so-called mother clubs, since in the mid-1940s, both SL Elvas and SC Elvense were experiencing some financial difficulties and given the lack of aid several times requested and refused by their mother clubs, they decided to unite in a single club and in this way, managed to keep the king sport alive in the interior region.

Thanks to the status of "SL Elvas", which already competed in the 1st Division, "O Elvas" continued it five times, in the 1940s. It debuted in 8th place in 1947–48, with victories against big clubs, such by 2–1 over SL Benfica, with two goals from Patalino or the 5–0 thrashing of Boavista and the 3–1 victory against SC Braga, followed by a 9th place in 1948–49 and 13th place in the following season, being, therefore, relegated to the second tier. Then returned to the 1st Division, in 1986–87, having finished in 16th place and, in the following season, ended up in 15th place, among 20 participating teams

On March 15, 1973, «O Elvas» F.C. XL first branch of O Elvas CAD was founded. In between, a reference, for the national title of the 3rd Division, won in 1954–55, in addition to several honorable classifications in the 2nd and 3rd National Division. In 1980–81, "O Elvas" lost the final of the 3rd Division Nacional, with the title being won by CF União de Coimbra in the second phase of the competition.

After a period of decline, the club descended to the District Championship of the Football Association of Portalegre and for years it only relied on its academy. Currently the team has a new president, a new project with a SAD, a new technical team and a young squad. The main team returns this year to the Campeonato de Portugal, and has academy teams at both district and national level.

The club already had the modality of basketball, which participated in the competitions of the "Associação de Basquetebol do Alentejo", also in the youth and senior levels, but which currently has its activity suspended.

== Season to season ==
Season	Level	Division	Section	Place	Movements
2013–14	Tier 4	Campeonatos de Portugal	Serie G	9TH	Relegated
2016–17	Tier 5	AF Portalegre	2nd Division	1st	Promoted
2017–18	Tier 5	AF Portalegre	1st Division	7th	
2020–21	Tier 5	AF Portalegre	1st Division	1st	Promoted
2021–22	Tier 4	Campeonatos de Portugal	Serie E	9TH	Relegated
2022–23	Tier 5	AF Portalegre	1st Division	1st	Promoted
2023–24	Tier 4	Campeonatos de Portugal	Serie D	6th	
2024–25	Tier 4	Campeonatos de Portugal	Serie C	1st	
2025–26	Tier 4	Campeonatos de Portugal	Serie D		

== Notable players ==
- (Portugal) Luís Vidigal
- (Timor-Leste) Claudio Osorio
