= Eléctrico F.C. =

Portuguese football club

Eléctrico FC
- Full name: Eléctrico Futebol Clube
- Founded: 1929
- Ground: Estádio Municipal de Ponte de Sor, Ponte de Sor
- Capacity: 1,100
- Chairman: (Portugal) Vítor Martins
- Manager: (Portugal) Emanuel Baleizão
- League: AF Portalegre 1ª Divisão
- 2023–24: AF Portalegre 1ª Divisão, 3rd of 7

Eléctrico Futebol Clube is a Portuguese football club from Ponte de Sor founded in 1929. Eléctrico Futebol Clube currently plays in the AF Portalegre 1ª Divisão district league. They currently play their home games at the Estádio Municipal de Ponte de Sor in Ponte de Sor with a capacity of 1,100.

== Futsal ==
Eléctrico F.C. has a futsal team that plays top tier futsal in the Liga Sport Zone.
