= Évora Football Association =

Governing body for football competitions in the Portuguese district of Évora

The Évora Football Association (Associação de Futebol de Évora, abrv. AF Évora) is the district governing body for all football competitions in the Portuguese district of Évora. It is also the regulator of the clubs registered in the district.

== Notable clubs in the Évora FA ==
- Lusitano de Évora
- Juventude de Évora
- Estrela de Vendas Novas

== Current Divisions: 2013–14 season ==
The AF Évora runs the following divisions covering the fifth and sixth tiers of the Portuguese football league system.

=== Divisão de Elite ===
- Atlético de Reguengos
- Casa do Povo de Cabrela - Grupo Desportivo
- Casa do Povo de Lavre
- Clube de Futebol de Estremoz
- Grupo Desportivo de Monte Trigo
- Grupo Desportivo de Portel
- Grupo Desportivo Os Oriolenses
- Juventude de Évora
- O Calipolense Clube Desportivo
- Redondense Futebol Clube
- Sociedade União Perolivense
- Sporting Clube de Viana do Alentejo

=== Divisão de Honra - Série A ===
- Aldeense Futebol Clube
- Associação Desportiva e Cultural de Santiago Maior
- Casa de Cultura de Corval
- Grupo Desportivo e Cultural de São Bartolomeu do Outeiro
- Grupo Desportivo e Recreativo Canaviais
- Lusitano de Évora
- Sport Clube Borbense
- Sport Clube Bencatelense

=== Divisão de Honra - Série B ===
- Grupo Desportivo Unidos da Giesteira
- Grupo Estrela Escouralense
- Futebol Clube de Santana do Campo
- Grupo Cultural e Desportivo Fazendas do Cortiço
- Lusitano Clube Desportivo Arraiolense
- Luso Futebol Clube Morense
- Sport Clube Alcaçovense
- Sport Clube Brotense
- Valenças Sport Clube

== See also ==
- Portuguese District Football Associations
- Portuguese football competitions
- List of football clubs in Portugal
