= Vila Real Football Association =

Portuguese district governing body for football competitions

The Vila Real Football Association (Associação de Futebol de Vila Real, abrv. AF Vila Real) is the district governing body for all football competitions in the Portuguese district of Vila Real. It is also the regulator of the clubs registered in the district.

== Notable clubs in the Vila Real FA ==
- G.D. Chaves
- Vila Real

== Current Divisions - 2011–12 Season ==
The AF Vila Real runs the following divisions covering the fifth and sixth tiers of the Portuguese football league system.

=== Honra – série A ===
- Centro Desportivo e Cultural de Montalegre
- Grupo Desportivo de Boticas
- Grupo Desportivo de Cerva
- Grupo Desportivo de Ribeira de Pena
- Grupo Desportivo de Valpaços
- Grupo Desportivo de Vilar de Perdizes
- Grupo Desportivo e Cultural de Salto
- Mondinense Futebol Clube
- Vidago Futebol Clube
- Vilarinho Futebol Clube

=== Honra – série B ===
- Abambres Sport Clube
- Associação Desportiva e Cultural de Santa Marta de Penaguião
- Associação Desportiva e Cultural Fernão Magalhães
- Atlético Clube Alijoense
- Centro Cultural Noura
- Futebol Clube de Fontelas
- Juventude de Pedras Salgadas - Associação Cultural, Desportiva e Recreativa
- Sabroso Sport Clube
- Sport Clube da Régua
- Sport Clube de Mesão Frio

== See also ==
- Portuguese District Football Associations
- Portuguese football competitions
- List of football clubs in Portugal
