= Leiria Football Association =

District football association

Coordinates: 39.739776°N 8.816271°W

Associação de Futebol de Leiria
- Abbreviation: AF Leiria
- Formation: 9 September 1925
- Purpose: District Football Association
- Headquarters: Rua Manuel Ribeiro de Oliveira
- Location(s): 2400-178 Leiria Portugal
- President: Júlio João Carreira Vieira
- Website: Official Website

The Leiria Football Association (Portuguese: Associação de Futebol de Leiria) is one of the 22 District Football Associations that are affiliated with the Portuguese Football Federation. The AF Leiria administers lower-tier football in the district of Leiria.

On 5 January 2014 Leiria FA won the Portuguese Regions Cup and will represent Portugal in the 2015 UEFA Regions' Cup, starting in September 2014.

== Background ==
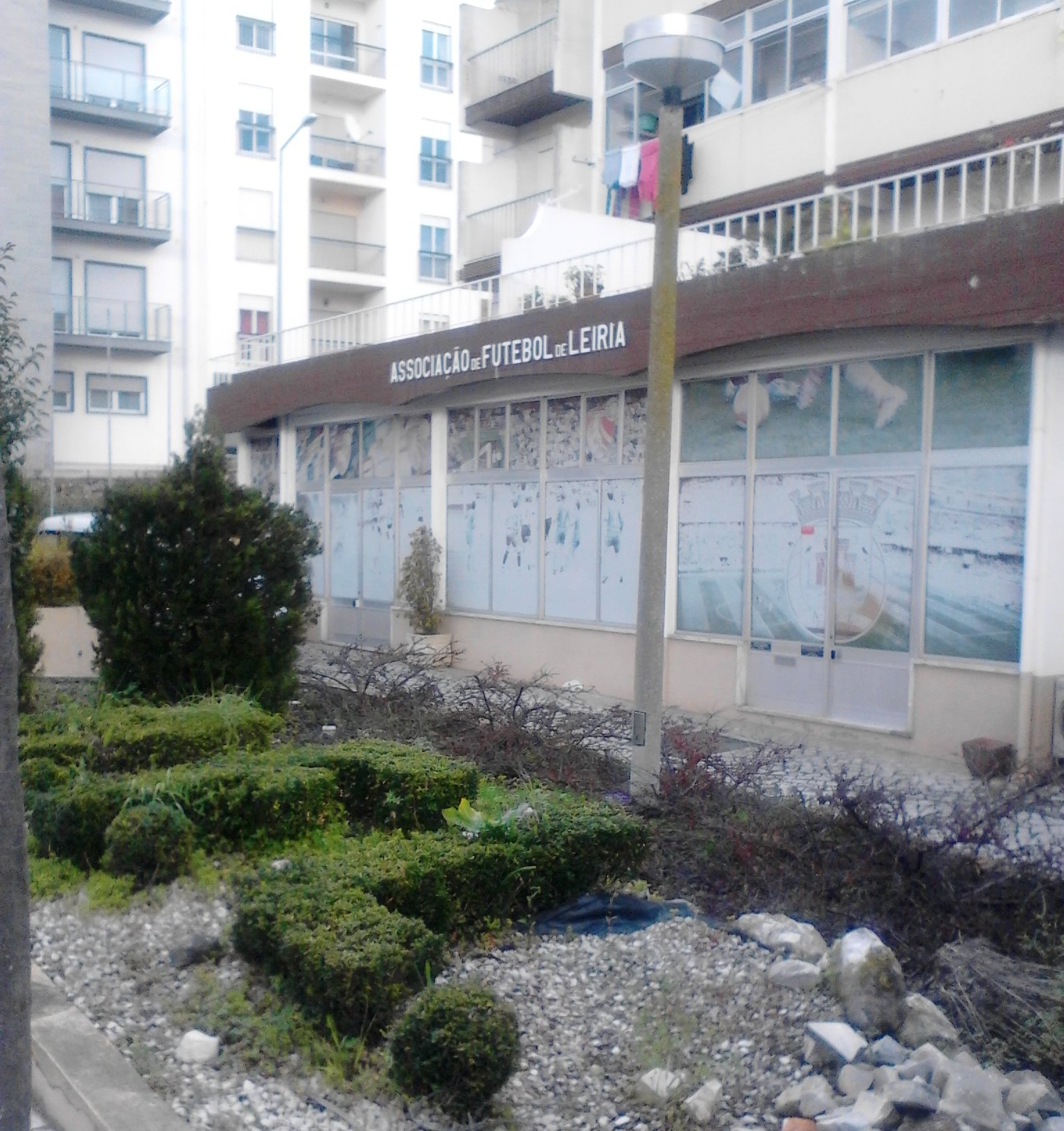

The association, commonly abbreviated as the AF Leiria, is the governing body for football in the Portuguese district of Leiria. The Football Association is based in Cruz de Areia in Leiria, close to Escola Secundária Francisco Rodrigues Lobo (Francisco Rodrigues Lobo Secondary School) and LeiriaShopping. The Association's President is Júlio Vieira.

Established on 9 September 1925, known then as Federação Desportiva do Distrito de Leiria (Leiria District Sports Federation), this Federation however ceased to exist in May 1926, due to the trouble times of the politically unstable and financially chaotic years of the Portuguese First Republic. On 20 May 1929, Leiria Football Association was restarted, in his current name. New statutes and regulations was discussed and approved, and elected his first President, Acácio de Almeida Henriques. The founding clubs were: Sport Club Bombarralense, Caldas Sport Clube, Sporting Club das Caldas, Grupo Desportivo "Os Nazarenos", Sporting Club da Nazaré, Atlético Clube Marinhense, Sport Operário Marinhense, Leiria Gimnasio Club, Gimnasio Sportivo Lis e Associação Académica.

== Competitions ==
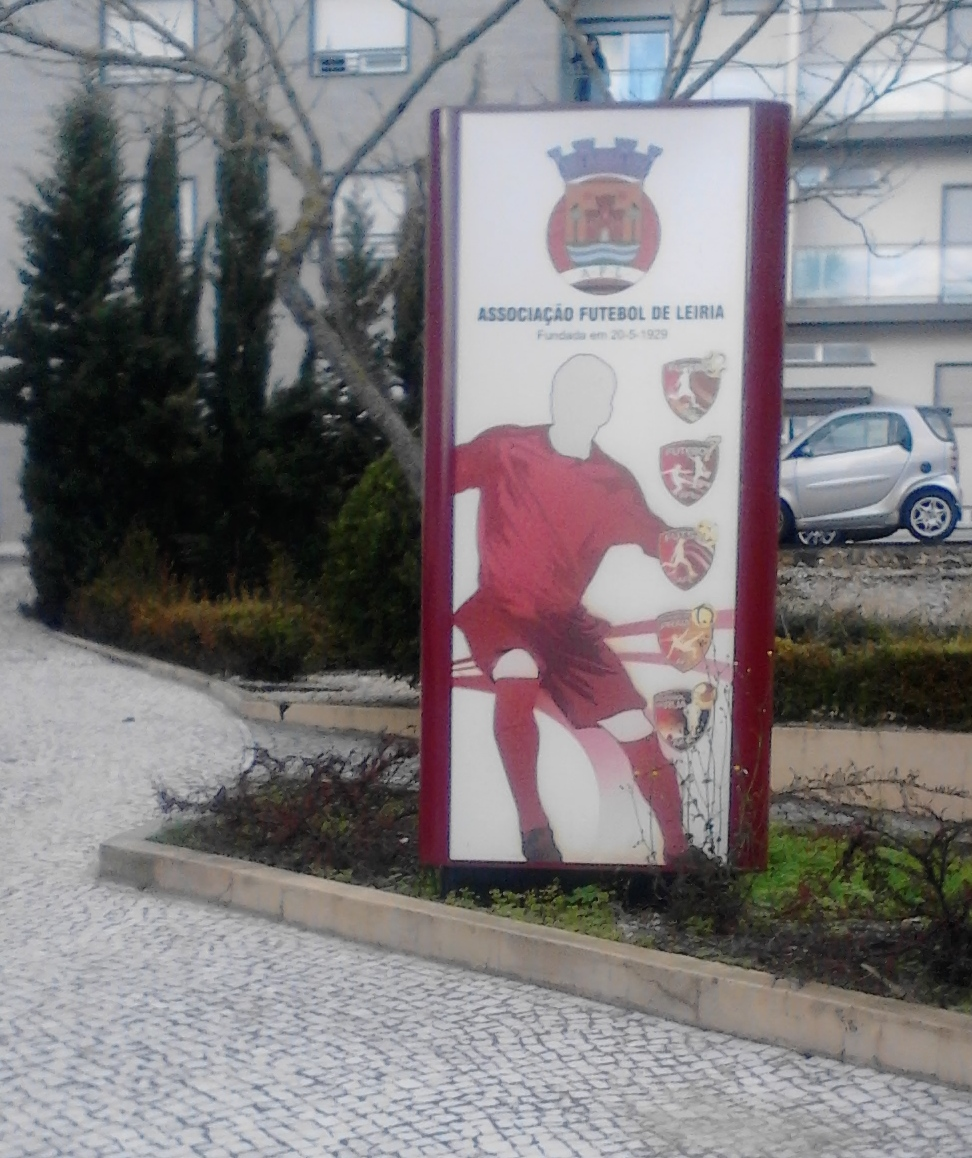

Leiria clubs compete in the three national levels of the Portuguese football league system in competitions run by the Portuguese League for Professional Football (Primeira Liga and Liga de Honra) and Portuguese Football Federation (Campeonato Nacional de Seniores).

Caldas Sport Clube join the First National Division, where remained four seasons from 1955–56 to 1958–59. In 2012 União de Leiria were demoted to the Segunda Divisão after failing to meet the deadline to sign the team in Liga de Honra, Leiria was automatically relegated to the third level. Ginásio Clube Alcobaça join the First National Division in 1982-83 for one season.

Below the Campeonato Nacional de Seniores (Portuguese Third Division) the competitions are organised at a district level (known in Portuguese as Distritais) with each District Association organising its competitions according to geographical and other factors. The AF Leiria runs to league competitions with the Liga de Honra (1ª division) being at the fourth level of the league system and 1ª Divisão (2ª division) at the fifth level. This second tier is divided into two groups on a geographical basis

In more general terms the AF Leiria currently organises District Championships for Soccer and Futsal for men and women for all age groups including Senior, Junior, Youth, Beginners, Infants and Schools.

== Notable clubs affiliated to AF Leiria 2023–24 season ==
Primeira Liga (tier 1)

- none

Segunda Liga (tier 2)

- União de Leiria

Liga 3 (tier 3)

- Caldas Sport Clube

Campeonato Nacional de Seniores (tier 4)

- Atlético Clube Marinhense
- Grupo Desportivo de Peniche

Distritais (tiers 5 & 6)

- Beneditense
- Ginásio Clube Alcobaça
- Sporting Clube de Pombal
- Associação Desportiva Portomosense

== District championships ==
=== Historic champions ===
Year	Champions
1929/30	Atlético Clube Marinhense
1930/31	Caldas Sport Clube
1932/33	Caldas Sport Clube
1933/34	Caldas Sport Clube
1934/35	Atlético Clube Marinhense
1935/36	Sporting Clube das Caldas
1936/37	Atlético Clube Marinhense
1937/38	Atlético Clube Marinhense
1938/39	S.C.U. Torreense

Year	Champions
1939/40	S.C.U. Torreense
1940/41	S.C.U. Torreense
1941/42	S.C.U. Torreense
1942/43	Atlético Clube Marinhense
1943/44	S.C.U. Torreense
1944/45	S.C.U. Torreense
1945/46	S.C.U. Torreense
1946/47	Ginásio Clube Alcobaça

=== Recent Division Honra winners ===
Season	1ª Divisão
2000/01	Ginásio Clube Alcobaça
2003/04	Grupo Desportivo Os Nazarenos
2004/05	Ginásio Clube Alcobaça
2005/06	Sport Clube Escolar Bombarralense
2006/07	União Desportiva da Serra
2007/08	Grupo Desportivo de Peniche
2008/09	Associação Desportiva Portomosense
2009/10	Sport Clube Escolar Bombarralense
2010/11	Ginásio Clube Alcobaça
2011/12	Centro Cultural e Recreativo Alqueidão da Serra
2012/13	Associação Desportiva Portomosense
2013/14	Sporting Clube Pombal
2014/15	Grupo Desportivo de Peniche
2015/16	Ginásio Clube Alcobaça
2016/17	Marinhense
2017/18	Grupo Desportivo de Peniche
2018/19	Marinhense

== List of member clubs ==
Abbreviation	Settlement	Official Name	Division (tier)	Cup	Other information
Alegre e Unido	Bajouca, Leiria	Grupo Alegre e Unido	Distritais (5)	None	
Alfeizerense	Alfeizerão	Sport União Alfeizerense	Distritais (5)	*	
Alqueidão da Serra	Alqueidão da Serra, Porto de Mós	Centro Cultural e Recreativo Alqueidão da Serra	Distritais (5)	*	
Alvaiázere	Alvaiázere	Grupo Desportivo de Alvaiázere	Distritais (5)	None	
Ansião	Ansião	Clube dos Caçadores de Ansião	Distritais (5)	*	
ARCUDA	Albergaria dos Doze, Pombal	Associação Recreativa e Cultural Desportiva de Albergaria dos Doze	Distritais (5)	None	
Atouguiense	Atouguia da Baleia, Peniche	Grupo Desportivo Atouguiense	Distritais (5)	*	
Avelarense	Avelar, Ansião	Atlético Clube Avelarense	Distritais (5)	None	
Beneditense	Benedita, Alcobaça	Associação Beneditense de Cultura e Desporto	Distritais (4)	* *	
Boavista	Boavista, Leiria	Grupo Desportivo e Recreativo da Boavista	Distritais (5)	None	
Bombarralense	Bombarral	Sport Clube Escolar Bombarralense	Distritais (5)	* *	
Caldas	Caldas da Rainha	Caldas Sport Clube	Campeonato Nacional (3)	* * *	
Caseirinhos	Pombal	Associação Cultural e Desportiva dos Caseirinhos	Distritais (5)	None	
Figueiró dos Vinhos	Figueiró dos Vinhos	Associação Desportiva de Figueiró dos Vinhos	Distritais (4)	*	
Ginásio Alcobaça	Alcobaça	Ginásio Clube Alcobaça	Distritais (4)	* *	
Guiense	Guia, Pombal	Grupo Desportivo Guiense	Distritais (4)	* *	
GRAP	Pousos, Leiria	Grupo Recreativo Amigos da Paz	Distritais (4)	None	
Ilha	Ilha, Pombal	Grupo Desportivo da Ilha	Distritais (5)	None	
Leiria e Marrazes	Marrazes, Leiria	Sport Clube Leiria e Marrazes	Distritais (4)	* *	
Lisboa e Marinha	Marinha Grande	Sport Lisboa e Marinha	Distritais (5)	None	
Maceirinha	Maceira, Leiria	Associação Cultural e Recreativa Maceirinha	Distritais (5)	*	
Marinhense	Marinha Grande	Atlético Clube Marinhense	Distritais (4)	* *	
Mata Mourisquense	Mata Mourisca, Pombal	Uniao Desportiva Recreativa Cultural Mata Mourisquense	Distritais (5)	None	
Meirinhas	Meirinhas, Pombal	Associação Recreativa de Meirinhas	Distritais (4)	None	
Moita do Boi	Louriçal, Pombal	Associação de Promoção Social, Desportiva, Recreativa e Cultural da Moita do Boi	Distritais (5)	None	
Motor Clube	Monte Redondo, Leiria	Motor Clube	Distritais (5)	None	
Nadadouro	Nadadouro, Caldas da Rainha	Associação Cultural Recreativa Nadadouro	Distritais (5)	None	
Nazarenos	Nazaré	Grupo Desportivo Nazarenos	Distritais (4)	* *	
Os Vidreiros	Marinha Grande	Grupo Desportivo «Os Vidreiros»	Distritais (5)	*	
Outeirense	Carvide, Leiria	Clube Os Democratas Recreativo Outeirense	Distritais (5)	None	
Pataiense	Pataias, Alcobaça	Clube Desportivo Pataiense	Distritais (4)	*	
Pedroguense	Pedrógão Grande	Recreio Pedroguense	Distritais (5)	None	
Pelariga	Pelariga, Pombal	Grupo Desportivo Pelariga	Distritais (4)	None	
Peniche	Peniche	Grupo Desportivo de Peniche	Distritais (4)	* * *	
Portomosense	Porto de Mós	Associação Desportiva Portomosense	Campeonato Nacional (3)	* *	
Pousaflores	Ansião	Grupo Desportivo Recreativo Pousaflores	Distritais (5)	None	
Ranha	Vermoil, Pombal	Associação Desportiva da Ranha	Distritais (5)	None	
Santo Amaro	Ortigosa, Leiria	Grupo Desportivo Santo Amaro	Distritais (5)	None	
Sp. Pombal	Pombal	Sporting Clube de Pombal	Distritais (4)	* *	
U.Leiria SAD	Leiria	União de Leiria	Campeonato Nacional (3)	* * *	
U.Leiria	Leiria	União de Leiria	Distritais (4)	None	
Unidos	Leiria	Grupo Desportivo, Recreativo e Cultural Unidos	Distritais (5)	None	
Vieirense	Vieira de Leiria, Marinha Grande	Industrial Desportivo Vieirense	Distritais (5)	* *	

Footnote

- 1-10 games in Portuguese Cup. *
- 11-100 games in Portuguese Cup. * *
- 101+ games in Portuguese Cup. * * *

== See also ==
- Portuguese District Football Associations
- Portuguese football competitions
- List of football clubs in Portugal
