= Santarém Football Association =

District sport governing body in Portugal

The Santarém Football Association (Associação de Futebol de Santarém, abrv. AF Santarém) is the district governing body for the all football competitions in the Portuguese district of Santarém. It is also the regulator of the clubs registered in the district.

== Notable clubs in the Santarém FA ==
- U.F.C.I. Tomar
- C.D. Fátima
- G.D.R. Monsanto
- Torres Novas

== Current Divisions - 2011–12 Season ==
The AF Santarém runs the following division covering the fifth and sixth tiers of the Portuguese football league system.

=== Honra ===
- Associação Desportiva Cidade Ferroviária do Entroncamento
- Associação Desportiva de Mação
- Associação Desportiva Fazendense
- Associação Recreativa de Porto Alto
- Atlético Clube Alcanenense
- Centro de Cultura Recreio e Desporto Moçarriense
- Clube Atlético Ouriense
- Clube Desportivo Amiense
- Clube Desportivo de Torres Novas
- Estrela Futebol Clube Ouriquense
- Grupo Desportivo Benavente
- U.F.C.I. Tomar

=== 2ª divisão – série A ===
- Associação Desportiva Recreativa e Cultural Vasco da Gama
- Centro de Cultura e Desporto de Caxarias
- Centro Desportivo Social Cultural do Cercal - Vale do Ninho
- Centro Recreativo e Cultural de Santo António de Assentis
- Clube Desportivo e Recreativo de Alferrarede "Os Dragões"
- Grupo Desportivo da Casa do Povo de Pego
- Sport Clube Ferreira do Zézere
- União Desportiva Abrantina
- União Desportiva Atalaiense
- Vitória Futebol Clube Mindense
- União Futebol Comércio e Indústria de Tomar

=== 2ª divisão – série B ===
- Clube Desportivo Salvaterrense
- Futebol Clube Goleganense
- Grupo de Futebol dos Empregados no Comércio
- Grupo Desportivo de Samora Correia
- Grupo Desportivo O Coruchense
- Grupo Desportivo Pontével
- Sport Clube Barrosense
- Sport Clube de Desportos de Glória do Ribatejo
- União Desportiva da Chamusca
- União Futebol Clube de Almeirim

== See also ==
- Portuguese District Football Associations
- Portuguese football competitions
- List of football clubs in Portugal
