= U.S.C. Paredes =

Portuguese football club

Paredes
- Full name: União Sport Clube Paredes
- Founded: 13 December 1924; 101 years ago
- Ground: Estádio Municipal das Laranjeiras, Paredes
- Capacity: 2,612
- Chairman: José Orlando Rocha
- Manager: Agostinho Bento
- League: Liga 3
- 2024–25: Campeonato de Portugal, 2nd (Group A)

União Sport Clube Paredes is a Portuguese sports club from Paredes. The men's football team competes in Liga 3, the third tier of Portuguese football. They were founded in 1924.

== History ==
The club was founded on 13 December 1924 in Paredes. The club was formed through the merger of several local clubs, including Aliança, Comércio, and Paredes, under the leadership of Father Marcelino da Conceição Evaristo Leal and Delfim Soares da Costa.

The club won its first title in 1926, claiming the Paredes–Valongo county championship. In 1941, Paredes won the AF Porto Third Division championship and earned promotion to the district second division.

Paredes later won the AF Porto Second Division title in 1958, securing promotion to the top district level. In 1974, the club achieved promotion to the national leagues for the first time after winning the AF Porto First Division championship.

The club made its debut in the Taça de Portugal during the 1974–75 season. In subsequent years, Paredes recorded several notable cup runs, including reaching the round of 16 in 1975–76 and the quarter-finals in 1983–84 and 2005–06.

During the 1983–84 Taça de Portugal campaign, Paredes reached the quarter-finals despite competing in the third division. The run ended with a defeat to Benfica.

In the 1999–2000 season, Paredes won its series in the Portuguese Third Division and later secured the national championship title after defeating Seixal in a penalty shoot-out.

The club also achieved success at youth level, including victories in regional youth competitions and women’s futsal tournaments.

== Current squad ==
As of 20 September 2026

Note: Flags indicate national team as defined under FIFA eligibility rules; some limited exceptions apply. Players may hold more than one non-FIFA nationality.

No.	Pos.	Nation	Player
2	DF	POR	Pedro Araújo
3	DF	POR	Dénis Duarte
5	DF	POR	Zé Oliveira
6	MF	ESP	Brais Val
7	FW	COL	Miguel Moreno
8	MF	POR	Diogo Silva
9	FW	BRA	João Pedro (on loan from Chaves)
10	MF	POR	Daniel Rodrigues
11	FW	ARG	Franco Almara
12	GK	POR	Miguel Rodrigues
13	DF	POR	João Vigário
14	FW	BRA	Erik

No.	Pos.	Nation	Player
16	GK	POR	Tiago Gonçalves
21	MF	POR	David Veiga
23	DF	POR	Zé Macedo
24	DF	POR	Edu Borges
26	DF	POR	Diogo Outeiro
29	MF	POR	Vasco Rocha
30	FW	POR	Francisco Canário
31	GK	POR	Fábio Matos
44	DF	BRA	Gustavo Fernandes
78	MF	POR	Ruca
84	FW	KOR	Jin-Young Yuk
