= Portalegre Football Association =

Portuguese district governing body for football competition

The Portalegre Football Association (Associação de Futebol de Portalegre, abrv. AF Portalegre) is the district governing body for the all football competitions in the Portuguese district of Portalegre. It is also the regulator of the clubs registered in the district.

== Notable clubs in the Portalegre FA ==
- Campomaiorense
- Eléctrico
- Club Desportivo Portalegrense
- O Elvas
- FC Crato
- Sport Clube Estrela
- Castelo de Vide
- SL Portalegre
- Mosteirense
- Nisa e Benfica

=== Performance by club ===
All Primeira Liga champions have come from either Lisbon or Porto.

Club	Winners
Club Desportivo Portalegrense	16
O Elvas	13
Sport Clube Estrela	12
Eléctrico	6
Campomaiorense	5
Os Elvenses	5
Nisa e Benfica	5
Mosteirense	4
SL Portalegre	4
Castelo de Vide	4
FC Crato	3
Benavilense	2
Arronchense	2
Fronteirense	2
Alpalhoense	2
SL Elvas	2
Gavionenses	1
Arenense	1
Souselense	1
AD Alter	1
Lanifícios Portalegre	1
CF Alentejo	1
SC Bombeiros Vol. Portalegre	1
SC Esperança	1

== Current divisions - 2024/25 season ==
The AF Portalegre runs the following division covering the fifth tier of the Portuguese football league system.

=== 1ª divisão ===
- Futebol Clube Mosteirense
- Eléctrico Futebol Clube
- Club Desportivo Portalegrense 1925
- Clube de Futebol "Os Gavionenses"
- Grupo Desportivo e Recreativo Gafetense
- Associação Desportiva Juventude de Santa Eulália

== See also ==
- Portuguese District Football Associations
- Portuguese football competitions
- List of football clubs in Portugal
