= Castelo Branco Football Association =

Portuguese Football Federation association

Associação de Futebol de Castelo Branco
- Abbreviation: AF Castelo Branco
- Formation: 1936
- Purpose: District Football Association
- Headquarters: Quinta do Amieiro de Baixo, Lt. 4
- Location(s): Apartado 75 6001-129 Castelo Branco Portugal
- President: Jorge Manuel Farinha Nunes
- Website: afcastelobranco.pt

The Associação de Futebol de Castelo Branco (Castelo Branco Football Association) is one of the 22 District Football Associations that are affiliated to the Portuguese Football Federation. The AF Castelo Branco administers lower tier football in the district of Castelo Branco.

== Background ==
Associação de Futebol de Castelo Branco, commonly referred to as AF Castelo Branco, is the governing body for football in the district of Castelo Branco which covers the 11 municipalities of Belmonte, Castelo Branco, Covilhã, Fundão, Idanha-a-Nova, Oleiros, Penamacor, Proença-a-Nova, Sertã, Vila de Rei and Vila Velha de Ródão. The Football Association is based in Castelo Branco. The Association's President is Jorge Manuel Farinha Nunes.

The organisation was established on 22 March 1936 and the early clubs included:

- Associação Académica Albicastrense
- Associação Humanitária dos Bombeiros Voluntários de Castelo Branco
- Clube de Futebol "Os Albicastrenses"
- Clube de Futebol "Os Covilhanenses"
- Desportivo Operário Covilhanense
- Onze Vermelho Albicastrense
- Sport Tortosendo e Benfica
- Sporting Clube de Castelo Branco
- Sporting Clube da Covilhã
- Sporting Clube do Fundão

Out of the 10 founding clubs, six no longer exist. Sporting Clube da Covilhã has been the most successful and has competed in the national division.

== Notable clubs in the Castelo Branco FA ==
- Sporting Covilhã — only Castelo Branco club to compete in Primeira Liga
- Benfica de Castelo Branco
- Sertanense
- G.D. Vitória de Sernache

== 2013–14 season ==
The AF Castelo Branco runs the following division covering the fourth tier of the Portuguese football league system.

=== 1ª Divisão ===
- Associação Cultural e Recreativa de Atalaia do Campo
- Associação Desportiva e Cultural de Pedrogão de S. Pedro
- Associação Desportiva e Cultural de Proença-A-Nova
- Associação Desportiva Estação
- Associação Recreativa e Cultural de Oleiros
- Centro Desportivo Recreativo e Cultural de Vila Velha de Rodão
- Clube Académico do Fundão
- Clube Desportivo de Alcains
- Grupo Desportivo Teixosense
- Grupo Desportivo Vitória de Sernache
- União Desportiva de Belmonte

== Former participants ==
Other clubs that have competed in the Distritais since the 1992/93 season include:

- Associação Cultural e Desportiva de Ferro
- Associação Cultural e Desportiva dos Amigos da Meimoa
- Associação Cultural e Recreativa Juncalense
- Associação Cultural Recreativa Desportiva do Cabeçudo
- Associação Desportiva Cultural Recreativa Amigos Soalheira
- Associação Desportiva do Fundão
- Associação Desportiva Penamacorense
- Associação Recreativa e Cultural Aldeia Nova Cabo
- Carvalhense Futebol Clube
- Centro Cultural Desportivo Recreativo Colmeal da Torre
- Centro Cultural e Desportivo Estrela do Zézere (Boidobra)
- Centro Cultural Recreativo Salgueiro do Campo
- Centro Desportivo Universitário da Beira Interior
- Centro Popular de Cultura e Desporto de Lardosa
- Clube Desportivo de Póvoa de Rio de Moínhos
- Clube Desportivo e Recreativo de Escalos de Cima
- Clube Recreativo de Aldeia do Souto
- Clube União Idanhense
- Desportivo de Castelo Branco
- Futebol Clube Estrela de Unhais da Serra
- Grupo Desportivo Águias de Moradal
- Grupo Desportivo Águias do Canhoso
- Grupo Desportivo Cultural Silvares
- Grupo Desportivo e Cultural dos Três Povos
- Grupo Desportivo Recreativo e Cultural Escalos de Baixo
- Grupo Desportivo Recreativo e Cultural Orvalho
- Grupo Desportivo Vales Rio
- Grupo Desportivo Valverde
- Industria Futebol Clube Cebolense
- Paúl Cultural Desportivo
- Sport Clube do Barco
- Sport Clube São Vicente da Beira
- União Desportiva Cariense
- União Lousense
- Vilarregense Futebol Clube

== District Championships ==
=== Historic champions ===
| Year | Champions |
|---|---|
| 1936/37 | Sporting da Covilhã |
| 1937/38 | Sporting da Covilhã |
| 1938/39 | Sporting da Covilhã |
| 1939/40 | Sporting da Covilhã |
| 1940/41 | Sporting da Covilhã |
| 1941/42 | Sporting da Covilhã |

| Year | Champions |
|---|---|
| 1942/43 | Sporting da Covilhã |
| 1943/44 | Sporting da Covilhã |
| 1944/45 | Sporting da Covilhã |
| 1945/46 | Sporting da Covilhã |
| 1946/47 | Sporting da Covilhã |

Titles

- Sporting da Covilhã - 11

=== Recent divisional winners ===
| Seasons | 1ª Divisão |
|---|---|
| 2005/06 | Penamacorense |
| 2006/07 | Unhais da Serra |
| 2007/08 | Atalaia do Campo |
| 2008/09 | Alcains |
| 2009/10 | Águias do Moradal |
| 2010/11 | Penamacorense |
| 2011/12 | Vitória de Sernache |
| 2012/13 | Águias do Moradal |
| 2013/14 | Vitória de Sernache |
| 2014/15 | Águias do Moradal |
| 2015/16 | Covilhã B |
| 2016/17 | Águias do Moradal |

== See also ==
- Portuguese District Football Associations
- Portuguese football competitions
- List of football clubs in Portugal
