= Setúbal Football Association =

Football governing body for Setúbal district, Portugal

The Setúbal Football Association (Associação de Futebol de Setúbal, abrv. AF Setúbal) is the district governing body for all football competitions in the Portuguese district of Setúbal. It is also the regulator of the clubs registered in the district.

== Notable clubs in the Setúbal FA ==
- Vitória Futebol Clube
- Barreirense
- GD Fabril (formerly CUF Barreiro)
- Amora
- Seixal
- Montijo
- CD Cova da Piedade

== Current Divisions - 2021–22 season ==
The AF Setúbal runs the following division covering the fifth and sixth tiers of the Portuguese football league system.

=== First division ===
- Alcochetense
- CD Cova Piedade B
- CDR Águas de Moura
- Charneca Caparica
- Comércio e Indústria
- Fabril Barreiro
- FC Setúbal
- GD Alfarim
- Moitense
- Monte Caparica AC
- O Grandolense
- Olímpico Montijo
- Palmelense
- Pescadores
- Seixal Clube 1925
- Sesimbra
- Trafaria
- União Santiago
- Vitória Setúbal B
- Vasco da Gama Sines

=== Second division ===
- ACRUT Zambujalense
- AD Quinta do Conde
- Alcochetense B
- Almada AC
- Amora FC B
- Arrentela
- Barreirense B
- Botafogo Cabanas
- Brejos de Azeitão
- Estrela St. André
- GC Corroios
- GD Lagameças
- Juventude Sarilhense
- Os Pelezinhos
- Paio Pires FC
- Samouquense
- Santoantoniense
- União Banheirense

== All-time Primeira Liga table ==
These are the most successful Setúbal FA clubs in the history of Primeira Liga (as of 02/2021):

Pos	Team	S	Pts	GP	W	D	L	GF	GA	GD	1st	2nd	3rd	4th	5th	6th	T	Debut	Since/ Last App	Best
1	Vitória de Setúbal	72	2590	2072	694	508	870	2794	3119	-325	–	1	3	2	9	6	21	1934–35	2019–20	2
2	CUF Barreiro	23	769	610	207	148	255	828	1003	-175	–	–	1	2	2	1	6	1942–43	1975–76	3
3	Barreirense	24	617	592	166	119	307	758	1195	-437	–	–	–	1	2	4	7	1937–38	1978–79	4
4	Montijo	3	89	90	23	20	47	91	155	-64	–	–	–	–	–	–	–	1972–73	1976–77	13
5	Amora	3	89	90	22	23	45	90	143	-53	–	–	–	–	–	–	–	1980–81	1982–83	12
6	Seixal	2	29	52	7	8	37	44	150	-106	–	–	–	–	–	–	–	1963–64	1964–65	12

== See also ==
- Portuguese District Football Associations
- Portuguese football competitions
- List of football clubs in Portugal
