= Portuguese football competitions =

Portuguese football is divided into divisions (divisões, singular — divisão). The major teams play in the Primeira Liga. The other professional teams play against each other in the LigaPro. The other major competitions are the Portuguese Cup, Portuguese League Cup and Portuguese Super Cup.

== Early years ==
Before 1922, the Portuguese teams played only local games with neighbouring clubs and later in the local championships as the Lisbon District Championship (Campeonato Distrital de Lisboa) or the Porto District Championship (Campeonato Distrital do Porto).

== Championship of Portugal ==
The nation was urging for a nationwide competition and the clubs organized the Championship of Portugal for the most important District Associations (Lisbon, Porto, Coimbra, Madeira, Algarve, and Braga). Setúbal Football Association teams also participated instead of Lisbon clubs if they won the Campeonato de Lisboa. In the first championship, only Lisbon, Porto, Madeira, and Algarve were invited and only Lisbon and Porto accepted. Later, all of them participated. This championship was played on a knock-out basis and was very similar to today's Portuguese Cup.

First held in 1922, it determined the Portuguese national champion and awarded the winning team with the same trophy that is currently awarded to the Portuguese Cup winners (although the Championship of Portugal titles don't count as Portuguese Cup titles and the winners of the Championship of Portugal no longer count as Portuguese football champions).

But after the formation of the first Portuguese Football Union (União Portuguesa de Futebol), and later (1926) Portuguese Football Federation (Federação Portuguesa de Futebol), the organization dissolved the former competitions and reformed Portuguese football.

== New names, new formats ==
The Championship of Portugal was turned into the Portuguese Cup, this time with all clubs in the nation (except for those in the colonies). The Premier League (a round-basis experimental league) was transformed into the National Championship of the First Division (Campeonato Nacional da Primeira Divisão), or just First Division (Primeira Divisão) with the major clubs.

The also experimental Segunda Divisão was given the name of National Championship of the Second Division, or just Second Division divided into two zones (North and South) and later into three zones (North, Center and South). The Terceira Divisão was also created with several geographical series.

The irregular local championships were assigned to the 22 Portuguese District Football Associations, and, therefore, the District Championships were created.

== End of dictatorship ==
With the end of the dictatorship in Portugal with the Carnation Revolution of 1974, the old 1938 format of the competitions needed some changes.

Firstly, the Portuguese League for Professional Football (Liga Portuguesa de Futebol Profissional) was created. This organization inside the Portuguese Football Federation (FPF) ruled the only professional league (First Division). The other competitions continued with the FPF.

A SuperCup was then introduced. The name chosen, SuperCup Cândido de Oliveira, was in honour of the Portuguese former football enthusiast and national coach in the early days. This competition was played on a yearly-basis between the First Division champion and the Portuguese Cup winner.

Since 1938, the First Division grew from 8 teams to 20 teams in 1989. The professional football was growing and a new professional competition was needed.

== The 1990s reform to nowadays ==
With the beginning of the 1990s, the Portuguese Football Federation and the Portuguese League for Professional Football agreed to create a new professional competition between the First Division and the Second Division. It would be called Division of Honour or Second Division of Honour (Segunda Divisão de Honra) and relegated the former zone-divided Second Division to third place. This competition continued to exist as "Second Division" but with B added to the name until 2005. From 1999 to 2005 it was divided in 3 zones (North, Center and South). From 2005 to 2012 it was renamed "Second Division" again.

In 2007, the Portuguese League Cup was created. It is only open to clubs that compete in the top two tiers of Portuguese football.

In 2013, the Second and Third Divisions merged to form the Campeonato Nacional de Seniores, the new third-tier football league, and in 2015 the Campeonato Nacional de Seniores was renamed "Campeonato de Portugal".

In 2020, the FPF announced the creation of Liga 3 which begins in 2021–22, supplanting the Campeonato de Portugal, which becomes the new fourth tier.

== Current league system ==
- Professional

Primeira Liga (Portuguese League for Professional Football as the governing body)
Liga Portugal 2 (Portuguese League for Professional Football as the governing body)

- Non-Professional

National

Liga 3 in 2021 (Portuguese Football Federation as the governing body)
Campeonato de Portugal (FPF as the governing body)

Regional

From one to four League Levels for each Portuguese District Football Associations.

== National cups ==
The Portuguese League for Professional Football also rules the Portuguese League Cup. The Portuguese Football Federation, the Portuguese Cup and the Super Cup.

== Other competitions ==
The Portuguese Football Federation also rules the national youth championships, the women's football, the indoor-football (or Futsal) and the Beach Soccer, being also responsible for all national teams.

== See also ==
- List of association football competitions in Portugal
- Portuguese football league system
