= 2015–16 Campeonato de Portugal =

3rd season of the Campeonato de Portugal football league

Campeonato de Portugal
- Season: 2015–16
- Champions: Cova da Piedade (1st title)
- Promoted: Cova da Piedade; Vizela; Fafe
- Relegated: Águias do Moradal; Argozelo; Arões; Atlético de Reguengos; Bustelo; Castrense; Coruchense; Crato; Eléctrico; Juventude de Évora; Lusitânia de Lourosa; Mondinense; Neves; Oliveira de Frades; Oliveira do Hospital; Peniche; Sabugal; Sobrado; Tirsense; Varzim B Vianense; Vila Real

The 2015–16 Campeonato de Portugal (also known as Campeonato de Portugal Prio, for sponsorship reasons) was the third season of Portuguese football's renovated third-tier league, since the merging of the Segunda Divisão and Terceira Divisão in 2013, the first season under the current Campeonato de Portugal title, and the 69th season of recognised third-tier football in Portugal. A total of 80 teams competed in this division, which began on 23 August 2015 and ended on 10 June 2016.

== Format ==
The competition format consisted of two stages. In the first stage, the 80 clubs were divided in eight series of 10 teams, according to geographic criteria. The only exceptions were teams from Madeira, which were placed in the first series, and teams from the Azores, which were distributed through the latter series. In each series, teams played against each other in a home-and-away double round-robin system.

In the second stage, the two best-placed teams from each first-stage series were divided in two groups of eight teams, again according to geographic proximity, with home-and-away matches. The two group winners, plus the winner of a two-legged play-off between the two group runners-up, secured promotion to the LigaPro. To determine the overall division champion, the group winners contested a one-off grand final on neutral ground.

The remaining eight clubs from each first-stage series were divided in eight groups of eight teams, with home-and-away matches. The bottom-two teams from each group were relegated to the Districts Championships. The sixth-placed teams were paired into four two-legged play-out ties, with the four winners being paired into two further two-legged play-out ties. All six play-out losers were also relegated.

== Teams ==
Relegated from the 2014–15 Segunda Liga:

- Marítimo B
- Trofense

From the 2014–15 Campeonato Nacional de Seniores:

- Fafe
- Mirandela
- Vilaverdense
- Bragança
- Vianense
- Pedras Salgadas
- Limianos
- Vizela
- Felgueiras 1932
- AD Oliveirense
- Amarante
- Vila Real
- Tirsense
- Sousense
- Salgueiros
- Gondomar
- Coimbrões
- Cinfães
- Sobrado
- Lusitânia de Lourosa
- Pedras Rubras
- Cesarense
- Lusitano de Vildemoinhos
- Anadia
- Sanjoanense
- Estarreja
- Gafanha
- Camacha
- Benfica e Castelo Branco
- AD Nogueirense
- Oliveira do Hospital
- Pampilhosa
- Mortágua
- Tourizense
- Vitória de Sernache
- Naval 1º de Maio
- Caldas
- União de Leiria
- Sertanense
- Alcanenense
- Torreense
- Eléctrico
- Casa Pia
- 1.º Dezembro
- Sacavenense
- Loures
- Cova da Piedade
- Pinhalnovense
- Sintrense
- Atlético da Malveira
- Operário
- Louletano
- Angrense
- Moura
- Lusitano VRSA
- Praiense
- Atlético de Reguengos

Promoted from the 2014–15 District Championships:

- Algarve FA: Almancilense
- Aveiro FA: Bustelo
- Beja FA: Castrense
- Braga FA: Torcatense and Arões
- Bragança FA: Argozelo
- Castelo Branco FA: Águias do Moradal
- Coimbra FA: Académica – SF
- Évora FA: Juventude de Évora
- Guarda FA: Sabugal
- Leiria FA: Peniche
- Lisboa FA: Real
- Madeira FA: none (Caniçal declined the promotion)
- Portalegre FA: Crato
- Porto FA: São Martinho and Varzim B
- Santarém FA: Coruchense
- Setúbal FA: Barreirense
- Viana do Castelo FA: Neves
- Vila Real FA: Mondinense
- Viseu FA: Oliveira de Frades
- Azores League: Sporting Ideal

== First stage ==
=== Serie A ===
Pos	Team	Pld	W	D	L	GF	GA	GD	Pts	Qualification	BRA	VIL	PED	MIR	LIM	MAR	CAM	VIA	ARG	NEV
1	Bragança	18	9	7	2	32	14	+18	34	Qualification to promotion groups	—	1–1	2–2	1–0	1–1	2–0	3–0	1–0	2–0	7–0
2	Vilaverdense	18	9	6	3	28	18	+10	33	Qualification to promotion groups	2–1	—	0–0	2–1	3–1	3–1	2–1	3–0	1–1	3–0
3	Pedras Salgadas	18	9	5	4	25	16	+9	32	Qualification to relegation groups	1–1	1–0	—	3–1	1–0	1–0	3–1	1–0	2–1	3–4
4	Mirandela	18	8	5	5	32	17	+15	29	Qualification to relegation groups	1–1	3–0	2–1	—	1–1	1–0	3–1	1–1	5–0	2–0
5	Limianos	18	7	7	4	22	20	+2	28	Qualification to relegation groups	1–0	2–1	2–1	2–2	—	1–0	0–0	1–1	2–0	2–1
6	Marítimo B	18	7	4	7	20	17	+3	25	Qualification to relegation groups	0–2	0–0	0–0	1–0	3–1	—	0–2	1–1	2–0	4–0
7	Camacha	18	4	7	7	20	23	−3	19	Qualification to relegation groups	1–1	1–2	0–2	1–1	0–0	1–1	—	3–0	2–1	0–0
8	Vianense	18	3	8	7	15	23	−8	17	Qualification to relegation groups	1–1	1–1	2–0	0–2	1–1	0–2	1–0	—	1–1	4–0
9	Argozelo	18	3	6	9	19	34	−15	15	Qualification to relegation groups	0–1	2–2	0–0	2–1	2–1	1–3	3–3	1–1	—	2–4
10	Neves	18	3	1	14	20	51	−31	10	Qualification to relegation groups	3–4	1–2	0–3	0–5	2–3	1–2	0–3	3–0	1–2	—

Rules for classification: 1) Points, 2) Head-to-head points, 3) Head-to-head goal difference, 4) Goal difference, 5) Matches won, 6) Goals scored

=== Serie B ===
Pos	Team	Pld	W	D	L	GF	GA	GD	Pts	Qualification	FAF	VIZ	ADO	TRO	FEL	SMA	TOR	ARO	MON	VAR
1	Fafe	18	11	5	2	35	15	+20	38	Qualification to promotion groups	—	1–2	0–3	2–1	0–0	2–1	6–0	1–1	6–1	1–0
2	Vizela	18	10	5	3	24	13	+11	35	Qualification to promotion groups	1–1	—	2–1	1–2	1–0	0–0	2–0	4–1	0–3	1–0
3	AD Oliveirense	18	9	4	5	25	15	+10	31	Qualification to relegation groups	0–1	1–0	—	1–0	0–0	1–0	2–0	1–2	2–1	1–3
4	Trofense	18	8	2	8	24	22	+2	26	Qualification to relegation groups	0–1	1–1	2–1	—	1–2	0–0	1–0	1–0	4–2	1–2
5	Felgueiras 1932	18	6	8	4	15	18	−3	26	Qualification to relegation groups	3–3	0–2	0–3	1–0	—	0–2	2–2	1–0	0–1	1–0
6	São Martinho	18	5	8	5	22	19	+3	23	Qualification to relegation groups	0–0	0–1	1–1	0–3	1–1	—	1–1	2–1	3–0	4–1
7	Torcatense	18	5	5	8	17	28	−11	20	Qualification to relegation groups	0–1	1–1	0–2	1–2	0–0	4–3	—	0–0	1–0	2–1
8	Arões	18	4	6	8	16	23	−7	18	Qualification to relegation groups	1–2	0–0	0–0	2–1	0–1	1–1	1–2	—	1–1	3–1
9	Mondinense	18	5	2	11	22	32	−10	17	Qualification to relegation groups	1–3	0–1	1–2	1–2	1–2	1–1	3–2	3–0	—	1–0
10	Varzim B	18	4	2	12	20	35	−15	14	Qualification to relegation groups	0–4	1–4	2–2	4–2	1–1	1–2	0–1	1–2	2–1	—

Rules for classification: 1) Points, 2) Head-to-head points, 3) Head-to-head goal difference, 4) Goal difference, 5) Matches won, 6) Goals scored

=== Serie C ===
Pos	Team	Pld	W	D	L	GF	GA	GD	Pts	Qualification	GON	PED	SAL	VIL	CIN	AMA	TIR	SOB	SOU	COI
1	Gondomar	18	9	6	3	25	16	+9	33	Qualification to promotion groups	—	1–1	1–0	3–0	2–2	1–1	2–1	1–1	0–1	1–2
2	Pedras Rubras	18	7	8	3	31	19	+12	29	Qualification to promotion groups	3–0	—	2–2	2–2	1–0	3–3	1–1	1–1	1–1	1–1
3	Salgueiros	18	8	4	6	24	18	+6	28	Qualification to relegation groups	1–2	3–2	—	3–1	2–0	1–0	1–1	0–1	1–1	2–1
4	Vila Real	18	7	6	5	22	22	0	27	Qualification to relegation groups	0–0	0–2	1–0	—	3–1	1–1	1–1	1–0	2–0	1–0
5	Cinfães	18	7	6	5	25	16	+9	27	Qualification to relegation groups	1–1	2–0	0–1	1–1	—	2–1	3–2	3–0	4–0	0–0
6	Amarante	18	5	6	7	23	24	−1	21	Qualification to relegation groups	0–3	1–0	0–2	1–2	1–0	—	1–1	3–0	2–2	0–2
7	Tirsense	18	4	7	7	18	25	−7	19	Qualification to relegation groups	0–1	0–2	3–3	1–0	0–3	0–3	—	1–1	1–1	1–0
8	Sobrado	18	4	6	8	15	26	−11	18	Qualification to relegation groups	1–2	0–4	0–2	1–1	1–0	2–1	1–2	—	3–0	1–1
9	Sousense	18	4	6	8	15	25	−10	18	Qualification to relegation groups	0–1	0–2	1–0	2–1	0–0	1–1	~~0–0~~	2–0	—	1–2
10	Coimbrões	18	4	5	9	19	26	−7	17	Qualification to relegation groups	1–3	1–3	1–0	2–3	1–1	2–0	1–2	1–1	4–2	—

Rules for classification: 1) Points, 2) Head-to-head points, 3) Head-to-head goal difference, 4) Goal difference, 5) Matches won, 6) Goals scored

=== Serie D ===
Pos	Team	Pld	W	D	L	GF	GA	GD	Pts	Qualification	EST	ANA	SAN	LVI	CES	OFD	MOR	LOU	GAF	BUS
1	Estarreja	18	13	5	0	38	14	+24	44	Qualification to promotion groups	—	4–2	1–0	0–0	2–0	5–0	1–1	1–0	3–0	1–0
2	Anadia	18	9	4	5	36	26	+10	31	Qualification to promotion groups	0–1	—	2–1	0–1	2–1	7–1	2–3	3–0	2–1	0–3
3	Sanjoanense	18	8	5	5	27	20	+7	29	Qualification to relegation groups	2–2	2–2	—	1–0	1–2	0–0	3–0	1–2	0–0	2–1
4	Lusitano de Vildemoinhos	18	8	5	5	33	23	+10	29	Qualification to relegation groups	1–3	2–2	2–3	—	2–2	0–0	3–0	4–3	2–1	4–0
5	Cesarense	18	5	7	6	26	24	+2	22	Qualification to relegation groups	2–3	1–2	0–3	1–1	—	3–1	5–0	0–0	2–2	2–0
6	Oliveira de Frades	18	5	5	8	21	32	−11	20	Qualification to relegation groups	3–3	0–3	1–2	0–1	2–1	—	1–2	1–0	4–2	0–0
7	Mortágua	18	4	7	7	22	36	−14	19	Qualification to relegation groups	0–1	1–1	1–2	1–6	1–2	2–2	—	2–0	2–2	2–1
8	Lusitânia de Lourosa	18	4	7	7	22	28	−6	19	Qualification to relegation groups	2–2	2–2	2–1	2–0	1–1	0–3	2–2	—	0–0	4–2
9	Gafanha	18	2	9	7	18	26	−8	15	Qualification to relegation groups	0–1	2–3	1–1	1–3	0–0	1–0	1–1	0–0	—	2–0
10	Bustelo	18	3	4	11	19	33	−14	13	Qualification to relegation groups	1–4	0–1	1–2	3–1	1–1	0–2	1–1	3–2	2–2	—

Rules for classification: 1) Points, 2) Head-to-head points, 3) Head-to-head goal difference, 4) Goal difference, 5) Matches won, 6) Goals scored

=== Serie E ===
Pos	Team	Pld	W	D	L	GF	GA	GD	Pts	Qualification	PRA	ANG	OPE	ADN	IDE	HOS	PAM	TOU	AAC	SAB
1	Praiense	18	11	2	5	36	22	+14	35	Qualification to promotion groups	—	2–1	2–2	1–2	2–0	1–0	1–1	3–0	2–0	3–2
2	Angrense	18	9	4	5	30	20	+10	31	Qualification to promotion groups	3–2	—	2–1	2–1	2–1	3–0	2–1	0–1	3–1	1–1
3	Operário	18	9	3	6	32	19	+13	30	Qualification to relegation groups	1–3	1–0	—	2–0	0–0	2–0	1–0	1–1	1–2	1–2
4	AD Nogueirense	18	9	2	7	29	33	−4	29	Qualification to relegation groups	2–1	1–0	1–7	—	3–0	0–3	3–2	1–1	3–2	4–3
5	Sporting Ideal	18	6	7	5	27	20	+7	25	Qualification to relegation groups	2–0	2–2	3–0	0–0	—	2–2	3–1	1–1	5–0	1–3
6	Oliveira do Hospital	18	5	8	5	25	31	−6	23	Qualification to relegation groups	1–4	1–1	0–4	4–3	2–2	—	0–0	1–0	2–2	1–0
7	Pampilhosa	18	6	3	9	23	30	−7	21	Qualification to relegation groups	1–2	1–5	0–1	3–2	1–0	2–2	—	2–1	2–0	2–1
8	Tourizense	18	4	7	7	15	26	−11	19	Qualification to relegation groups	1–4	0–0	2–1	2–0	0–3	1–1	0–2	—	1–1	1–1
9	Académica – SF	18	5	3	10	25	38	−13	18	Qualification to relegation groups	3–2	3–2	1–3	0–1	1–2	2–3	1–0	4–1	—	1–1
10	Sabugal	18	4	5	9	25	28	−3	17	Qualification to relegation groups	0–1	0–1	0–3	0–2	0–0	2–2	5–2	0–1	4–1	—

Rules for classification: 1) Points, 2) Head-to-head points, 3) Head-to-head goal difference, 4) Goal difference, 5) Matches won, 6) Goals scored

=== Serie F ===
Pos	Team	Pld	W	D	L	GF	GA	GD	Pts	Qualification	LEI	BCB	CAL	PEN	ALC	NAV	SER	VSE	AGU	CRA
1	União de Leiria	18	13	4	1	29	6	+23	43	Qualification to promotion groups	—	3–0	0–0	1–0	0–0	0–0	1–0	5–1	6–2	3–1
2	Benfica e Castelo Branco	18	10	4	4	20	12	+8	34	Qualification to promotion groups	1–0	—	1–2	2–0	3–0	2–1	1–0	2–1	2–1	3–0
3	Caldas	18	8	7	3	25	11	+14	31	Qualification to relegation groups	0–0	0–1	—	1–0	3–0	0–0	1–0	1–2	5–0	2–2
4	Peniche	18	8	2	8	19	22	−3	26	Qualification to relegation groups	1–2	0–0	0–2	—	1–1	1–0	1–2	2–1	2–1	2–1
5	Alcanenense	18	7	5	6	17	19	−2	26	Qualification to relegation groups	0–2	1–0	2–0	0–1	—	2–0	2–0	0–2	4–3	2–0
6	Naval 1º de Maio	18	5	6	7	14	15	−1	21	Qualification to relegation groups	0–1	2–0	1–1	2–1	0–0	—	1–0	4–1	1–2	2–1
7	Sertanense	18	5	5	8	19	19	0	20	Qualification to relegation groups	0–1	1–1	1–2	5–2	2–0	0–0	—	1–2	1–1	1–0
8	Vitória de Sernache	18	5	5	8	18	26	−8	20	Qualification to relegation groups	0–2	0–0	0–0	1–2	0–0	2–0	0–2	—	0–0	2–0
9	Águias do Moradal	18	3	6	9	20	33	−13	15	Qualification to relegation groups	0–1	0–1	1–1	0–2	1–1	0–0	2–2	4–2	—	0–1
10	Crato	18	2	4	12	11	29	−18	10	Qualification to relegation groups	0–1	0–0	0–4	0–1	1–2	1–0	1–1	1–1	1–2	—

Rules for classification: 1) Points, 2) Head-to-head points, 3) Head-to-head goal difference, 4) Goal difference, 5) Matches won, 6) Goals scored

=== Serie G ===
Pos	Team	Pld	W	D	L	GF	GA	GD	Pts	Qualification	CPI	DEZ	LOU	REA	SIN	MAL	TOR	SAC	COR	ELE
1	Casa Pia	18	10	5	3	28	12	+16	35	Qualification to promotion groups	—	0–0	1–1	4–0	0–1	3–0	1–1	2–0	2–2	3–0
2	1º de Dezembro	18	8	9	1	23	8	+15	33	Qualification to promotion groups	0–2	—	0–0	1–0	2–1	1–1	3–0	0–0	4–0	3–1
3	Loures	18	9	5	4	16	15	+1	32	Qualification to relegation groups	2–1	0–0	—	0–2	2–1	1–0	0–0	2–1	1–3	2–1
4	Real	18	9	3	6	24	23	+1	30	Qualification to relegation groups	2–0	1–2	0–1	—	2–2	2–1	1–0	3–1	2–0	1–0
5	Sintrense	18	8	4	6	22	21	+1	28	Qualification to relegation groups	1–1	0–2	0–1	2–2	—	2–0	2–1	2–2	1–0	2–0
6	Atlético da Malveira	18	8	4	6	24	21	+3	28	Qualification to relegation groups	0–1	0–0	1–0	3–1	1–0	—	0–1	1–1	2–1	5–2
7	Torreense	18	7	5	6	20	14	+6	26	Qualification to relegation groups	0–1	0–0	0–0	3–0	3–0	3–4	—	2–0	3–0	2–0
8	Sacavenense	18	3	7	8	21	27	−6	16	Qualification to relegation groups	1–2	1–1	3–0	2–2	0–1	1–1	2–0	—	3–2	1–1
9	Coruchense	18	3	3	12	18	31	−13	12	Qualification to relegation groups	1–2	1–1	1–2	0–1	1–2	1–2	0–0	4–2	—	1–0
10	Eléctrico	18	2	1	15	9	33	−24	7	Qualification to relegation groups	0–2	0–3	0–1	1–2	1–2	0–2	0–1	1–0	1–0	—

Rules for classification: 1) Points, 2) Head-to-head points, 3) Head-to-head goal difference, 4) Goal difference, 5) Matches won, 6) Goals scored

=== Serie H ===
Pos	Team	Pld	W	D	L	GF	GA	GD	Pts	Qualification	COV	MOU	REG	BAR	LUS	LOU	ALM	JUV	CAS	PIN
1	Cova da Piedade	18	10	5	3	26	13	+13	35	Qualification to promotion groups	—	1–0	0–0	3–1	2–2	1–0	1–2	2–0	0–0	1–0
2	Moura	18	8	5	5	25	17	+8	29	Qualification to promotion groups	1–0	—	1–2	0–0	1–0	4–2	2–0	1–1	2–1	2–1
3	Atlético de Reguengos	18	8	4	6	19	19	0	28	Qualification to relegation groups	0–2	1–0	—	3–1	1–4	1–0	0–1	2–2	2–0	2–1
4	Barreirense	18	6	7	5	25	20	+5	25	Qualification to relegation groups	0–2	0–0	1–1	—	2–0	2–0	5–0	2–2	2–2	3–1
5	Lusitano VRSA	18	7	3	8	21	23	−2	24	Qualification to relegation groups	0–2	1–6	0–0	0–1	—	1–1	1–0	2–0	4–1	0–1
6	Louletano	18	7	2	9	26	25	+1	23	Qualification to relegation groups	0–1	2–0	2–0	2–1	0–1	—	2–0	2–3	1–2	1–0
7	Almancilense	18	5	7	6	16	25	−9	22	Qualification to relegation groups	2–2	1–0	2–1	1–1	1–2	4–3	—	1–1	0–0	0–0
8	Juventude de Évora	18	4	8	6	21	28	−7	20	Qualification to relegation groups	2–2	1–1	1–2	1–0	2–1	0–3	0–0	—	1–1	3–1
9	Castrense	18	4	7	7	20	25	−5	19	Qualification to relegation groups	1–0	2–3	0–1	1–2	2–0	2–3	1–1	2–1	—	0–0
10	Pinhalnovense	18	4	6	8	20	24	−4	18	Qualification to relegation groups	2–4	1–1	1–0	1–1	0–2	2–2	3–0	3–0	2–2	—

Rules for classification: 1) Points, 2) Head-to-head points, 3) Head-to-head goal difference, 4) Goal difference, 5) Matches won, 6) Goals scored

== Second stage ==
=== Promotion groups ===
==== North zone ====
Pos	Team	Pld	W	D	L	GF	GA	GD	Pts	Promotion or qualification	VIZ	FAF	BRA	EST	VIL	GON	ANA	PED
1	Vizela (P)	14	9	4	1	20	11	+9	31	Promotion to 2016–17 LigaPro	—	0–2	2–1	1–0	1–0	2–1	1–1	1–0
2	Fafe (O, P)	14	8	6	0	16	5	+11	30	Qualification to promotion play-off	1–1	—	2–1	2–0	0–0	0–0	2–1	1–0
3	Bragança	14	6	3	5	17	15	+2	21		0–2	0–1	—	0–0	1–1	0–1	2–0	1–0
4	Estarreja	14	5	4	5	13	13	0	19		0–1	0–0	1–3	—	2–1	2–1	1–0	2–0
5	Vilaverdense	14	4	5	5	15	15	0	17		2–2	0–0	0–1	2–1	—	3–0	1–0	1–1
6	Gondomar	14	4	2	8	14	22	−8	14		1–3	1–2	2–2	1–3	2–0	—	0–1	1–0
7	Anadia	14	3	3	8	12	18	−6	12		2–3	0–2	1–2	0–0	2–3	2–0	—	1–1
8	Pedras Rubras	14	1	5	8	11	17	−6	8		0–0	1–1	2–3	1–1	3–0	2–3	0–1	—

Rules for classification: 1) Points, 2) Head-to-head points, 3) Head-to-head goal difference, 4) Goal difference, 5) Matches won, 6) Goals scored
(O) Play-off winners; (P) Promoted

==== South zone ====
Pos	Team	Pld	W	D	L	GF	GA	GD	Pts	Promotion or qualification	COV	CPI	BCB	PRA	LEI	DEZ	ANG	MOU
1	Cova da Piedade (C, P)	14	8	3	3	21	14	+7	27	Promotion to 2016–17 LigaPro	—	2–0	2–0	2–4	1–1	2–0	2–1	2–1
2	Casa Pia	14	6	5	3	19	11	+8	23	Qualification to promotion play-off	1–0	—	1–1	5–0	2–2	3–0	1–0	2–1
3	Benfica e Castelo Branco	14	5	7	2	19	10	+9	22		1–0	1–1	—	2–2	0–0	1–2	2–0	6–1
4	Praiense	14	6	3	5	21	23	−2	21		1–2	1–0	1–1	—	1–0	1–2	0–1	3–1
5	União de Leiria	14	5	6	3	23	15	+8	21		1–1	1–1	0–1	2–2	—	1–2	4–1	3–1
6	1º de Dezembro	14	6	1	7	12	19	−7	19		0–1	0–1	0–3	1–3	0–2	—	2–1	1–0
7	Angrense	14	3	2	9	13	26	−13	11		2–2	2–1	0–0	4–1	1–4	0–2	—	0–3
8	Moura	14	2	3	9	12	22	−10	9		1–2	0–0	0–0	0–1	1–2	0–0	2–0	—

Rules for classification: 1) Points, 2) Head-to-head points, 3) Head-to-head goal difference, 4) Goal difference, 5) Matches won, 6) Goals scored
(C) Champions; (P) Promoted

=== Promotion play-off ===
29 May 2016
14:00 WEST (UTC+01:00)

Casa Pia	0–1	Fafe
		Landinho 76' (pen.)

Estádio Pina Manique, Lisbon
Referee: Rui Soares
4 June 2016
14:00 WEST (UTC+01:00)

Fafe	0–0	Casa Pia

Parque Municipal dos Desportos, Fafe
Referee: Nuno Roque

Fafe won 1–0 on aggregate and were promoted.

=== Final ===
5 June 2016
15:00 WEST (UTC+01:00)

Vizela	0–0 (a.e.t.)	Cova da Piedade
Penalties
Fininho (penalty missed); Serge Kevyn (penalty missed); Ferraz (penalty missed); Boakye (penalty missed)	0–2	(penalty scored) Rúben Nunes; (penalty missed) Bicho; (penalty scored) Silas

Estádio Municipal de Abrantes, Abrantes
Referee: José Laranjeira

=== Relegation groups ===
==== Serie A ====
Pos	Team	Pld	W	D	L	GF	GA	GD	Pts	Qualification or relegation	MAR	PED	MIR	LIM	CAM	VIA	NEV	ARG
1	Marítimo B	14	10	3	1	29	10	+19	46		—	4–1	2–0	2–0	2–0	3–2	2–1	6–1
2	Pedras Salgadas	14	4	5	5	18	21	−3	33		1–0	—	1–0	0–0	0–0	2–1	1–3	2–3
3	Mirandela	14	4	6	4	9	9	0	33		0–1	0–0	—	2–1	1–1	1–0	0–0	0–0
4	Limianos	14	4	4	6	16	18	−2	30		0–1	4–4	0–2	—	1–0	1–0	2–1	0–0
5	Camacha	14	4	6	4	16	16	0	28		3–3	1–1	0–0	2–1	—	1–0	1–1	2–1
6	Vianense (R)	14	5	3	6	13	15	−2	27	Qualification to relegation play-out	0–0	2–1	0–0	0–3	1–0	—	0–0	2–1
7	Neves (R)	14	6	4	4	20	16	+4	27	Relegation to District Championships	0–2	2–1	2–0	1–1	3–2	2–4	—	3–0
8	Argozelo (R)	14	2	3	9	13	29	−16	17	Relegation to District Championships	1–1	1–3	1–3	3–2	1–3	0–1	0–1	—

Rules for classification: 1) Points, 2) Head-to-head points, 3) Head-to-head goal difference, 4) Goal difference, 5) Matches won, 6) Goals scored
(R) Relegated

==== Serie B ====
Pos	Team	Pld	W	D	L	GF	GA	GD	Pts	Qualification or relegation	ADO	TOR	SMA	FEL	TRO	ARO	VAR	MON
1	AD Oliveirense	14	7	5	2	18	10	+8	42		—	1–1	1–1	2–0	1–1	1–0	2–1	1–0
2	Torcatense	14	6	6	2	19	13	+6	34		1–1	—	2–1	2–0	2–2	4–1	0–0	2–1
3	São Martinho	14	6	4	4	23	18	+5	34		2–0	0–1	—	1–1	3–1	2–2	3–2	3–1
4	Felgueiras 1932	14	3	7	4	12	16	−4	29		0–0	1–1	1–0	—	1–1	1–0	1–1	2–0
5	Trofense	14	2	8	4	17	23	−6	27		0–3	0–0	2–1	2–2	—	1–1	0–0	0–1
6	Arões (R)	14	5	3	6	19	20	−1	27	Qualification to relegation play-out	2–1	1–0	1–1	4–1	1–2	—	1–0	4–3
7	Varzim B (R)	14	5	3	6	20	18	+2	25	Relegation to District Championships	1–2	0–1	2–3	2–1	5–3	1–0	—	3–0
8	Mondinense (R)	14	3	2	9	16	26	−10	20	Relegation to District Championships	0–2	4–2	1–2	0–0	2–2	2–1	1–2	—

Rules for classification: 1) Points, 2) Head-to-head points, 3) Head-to-head goal difference, 4) Goal difference, 5) Matches won, 6) Goals scored
(R) Relegated

==== Serie C ====
Pos	Team	Pld	W	D	L	GF	GA	GD	Pts	Qualification or relegation	SAL	SOU	CIN	AMA	COI	VIL	TIR	SOB
1	Salgueiros	14	6	6	2	15	6	+9	38		—	3–0	0–0	1–0	1–2	3–0	1–0	2–1
2	Sousense	14	7	3	4	19	17	+2	33		1–1	—	2–1	1–0	1–0	3–2	1–2	2–0
3	Cinfães	14	5	4	5	14	9	+5	33		0–0	0–1	—	2–0	0–0	5–0	1–0	2–0
4	Amarante	14	5	6	3	14	11	+3	32		0–0	1–1	1–0	—	1–1	2–1	1–1	3–0
5	Coimbrões	14	5	6	3	17	14	+3	30		2–1	1–1	1–1	0–0	—	2–1	2–0	1–0
6	Vila Real (R)	14	5	1	8	19	28	−9	30	Qualification to relegation play-out	0–2	1–0	0–2	1–2	4–3	—	2–0	2–1
7	Tirsense (R)	14	4	6	4	14	15	−1	28	Relegation to District Championships	0–0	3–2	2–0	1–1	1–1	2–2	—	1–0
8	Sobrado (R)	14	2	2	10	11	23	−12	17	Relegation to District Championships	0–0	2–3	2–0	1–2	2–1	1–3	1–1	—

Rules for classification: 1) Points, 2) Head-to-head points, 3) Head-to-head goal difference, 4) Goal difference, 5) Matches won, 6) Goals scored
(R) Relegated

==== Serie D ====
Pos	Team	Pld	W	D	L	GF	GA	GD	Pts	Qualification or relegation	SAN	CES	LVI	MOR	GAF	LOU	OFD	BUS
1	Sanjoanense	14	9	4	1	27	11	+16	46		—	3–1	1–0	2–0	3–0	0–0	4–1	2–0
2	Cesarense	14	8	3	3	21	13	+8	38		2–1	—	2–1	3–1	2–1	1–1	1–0	2–1
3	Lusitano de Vildemoinhos	14	5	4	5	16	10	+6	34		2–2	2–1	—	0–0	1–1	3–0	1–0	3–0
4	Mortágua	14	6	1	7	13	16	−3	29		0–1	0–2	1–0	—	3–0	1–0	2–1	1–0
5	Gafanha	14	5	4	5	14	17	−3	27		1–2	1–1	1–0	2–1	—	2–1	1–1	2–1
6	Lusitânia de Lourosa (R)	14	4	5	5	13	16	−3	27	Qualification to relegation play-out	2–2	1–0	1–0	0–1	0–0	—	1–1	2–0
7	Oliveira de Frades (R)	14	3	3	8	15	22	−7	22	Relegation to District Championships	1–1	1–2	0–3	3–1	0–2	3–1	—	2–0
8	Bustelo (R)	14	3	2	9	10	22	−12	18	Relegation to District Championships	1–3	0–0	0–0	2–1	1–0	2–3	2–1	—

Rules for classification: 1) Points, 2) Head-to-head points, 3) Head-to-head goal difference, 4) Goal difference, 5) Matches won, 6) Goals scored
(R) Relegated

==== Serie E ====
Pos	Team	Pld	W	D	L	GF	GA	GD	Pts	Qualification or relegation	OPE	IDE	AAC	PAM	TOU	ADN	HOS	SAB
1	Operário	14	9	2	3	23	10	+13	44		—	3–1	3–0	2–0	0–0	2–0	4–0	2–1
2	Sporting Ideal	14	6	2	6	17	13	+4	33		2–0	—	2–1	2–0	0–0	2–0	4–0	2–0
3	Académica – SF	14	7	2	5	19	19	0	32		2–1	2–0	—	2–1	2–2	2–0	2–1	2–2
4	Pampilhosa	14	6	2	6	19	19	0	31		1–2	3–1	2–1	—	2–0	3–0	1–0	2–3
5	Tourizense	14	5	6	3	13	11	+2	31		2–0	0–0	0–1	0–0	—	4–3	0–1	1–0
6	AD Nogueirense (O)	14	5	1	8	20	24	−4	31	Qualification to relegation play-out	1–1	1–0	3–0	4–1	1–2	—	1–2	2–1
7	Oliveira do Hospital (R)	14	4	3	7	13	21	−8	27	Relegation to District Championships	0–1	2–1	2–0	1–1	1–1	1–2	—	1–1
8	Sabugal (R)	14	4	2	8	15	22	−7	23	Relegation to District Championships	0–2	1–0	0–2	1–2	0–1	3–2	2–1	—

Rules for classification: 1) Points, 2) Head-to-head points, 3) Head-to-head goal difference, 4) Goal difference, 5) Matches won, 6) Goals scored
(O) Play-off winners; (R) Relegated

==== Serie F ====
Pos	Team	Pld	W	D	L	GF	GA	GD	Pts	Qualification or relegation	ALC	CAL	VSE	SER	NAV	AGU	PEN	CRA
1	Alcanenense	14	8	5	1	17	6	+11	42		—	2–0	2–1	1–1	1–1	0–0	3–1	2–0
2	Caldas	14	7	5	2	21	13	+8	42		0–0	—	3–2	2–1	2–0	0–0	5–2	2–0
3	Vitória de Sernache	14	5	4	5	14	17	−3	29		0–1	1–1	—	1–0	2–1	0–0	0–0	2–1
4	Sertanense	14	4	6	4	19	14	+5	28		1–0	0–0	4–0	—	1–1	0–2	2–0	1–1
5	Naval 1º de Maio	14	4	5	5	20	24	−4	28		0–1	3–0	2–2	2–5	—	1–1	0–0	2–0
6	Águias do Moradal (R)	14	3	7	4	14	16	−2	24	Qualification to relegation play-out	1–1	1–3	0–1	2–2	3–4	—	3–1	1–0
7	Peniche (R)	14	2	4	8	10	22	−12	23	Relegation to District Championships	0–1	1–1	1–2	1–0	1–2	0–0	—	2–1
8	Crato (R)	14	4	2	8	15	18	−3	19	Relegation to District Championships	0–2	0–2	1–0	1–1	5–1	3–0	2–0	—

Rules for classification: 1) Points, 2) Head-to-head points, 3) Head-to-head goal difference, 4) Goal difference, 5) Matches won, 6) Goals scored
(R) Relegated

==== Serie G ====
Pos	Team	Pld	W	D	L	GF	GA	GD	Pts	Qualification or relegation	SIN	MAL	LOU	REA	TOR	SAC	ELE	COR
1	Sintrense	14	6	6	2	21	14	+7	38		—	0–0	5–2	1–0	2–0	2–2	1–0	3–0
2	Atlético da Malveira	14	6	5	3	11	10	+1	37		1–1	—	2–1	1–3	0–0	0–0	1–0	2–0
3	Loures	14	6	3	5	19	17	+2	37		4–1	0–1	—	1–0	1–0	3–0	1–1	3–1
4	Real	14	5	4	5	16	13	+3	34		1–0	3–0	1–1	—	0–2	2–0	2–2	2–1
5	Torreense	14	3	7	4	11	12	−1	29		2–2	1–0	0–1	2–2	—	0–0	1–2	1–0
6	Sacavenense (O)	14	4	7	3	11	11	0	27	Qualification to relegation play-out	0–0	1–1	0–0	1–0	1–1	—	2–0	0–1
7	Eléctrico (R)	14	3	6	5	9	10	−1	19	Relegation to District Championships	0–0	0–1	3–0	1–0	0–0	0–1	—	0–0
8	Coruchense (R)	14	2	4	8	9	20	−11	16	Relegation to District Championships	2–3	0–1	2–1	0–0	1–1	1–3	0–0	—

Rules for classification: 1) Points, 2) Head-to-head points, 3) Head-to-head goal difference, 4) Goal difference, 5) Matches won, 6) Goals scored
(O) Play-off winners; (R) Relegated

==== Serie H ====
Pos	Team	Pld	W	D	L	GF	GA	GD	Pts	Qualification or relegation	ALM	BAR	LUS	PIN	LOU	REG	CAS	JUV
1	Almancilense	14	10	3	1	28	14	+14	44		—	1–0	2–1	4–4	3–0	3–2	1–0	3–0
2	Barreirense	14	5	5	4	14	14	0	33		2–0	—	2–1	0–2	0–0	0–0	1–1	1–1
3	Lusitano VRSA	14	6	1	7	23	21	+2	31		0–2	1–0	—	1–0	4–1	2–1	3–1	5–1
4	Pinhalnovense	14	6	4	4	20	16	+4	31		0–1	3–0	2–1	—	3–1	2–1	0–0	1–1
5	Louletano	14	5	4	5	15	17	−2	31		1–2	1–1	3–1	2–0	—	0–0	1–0	2–0
6	Atlético de Reguengos (R)	14	3	5	6	14	17	−3	28	Qualification to relegation play-out	0–0	1–2	2–1	2–0	1–1	—	1–1	3–2
7	Castrense (R)	14	3	7	4	16	18	−2	26	Relegation to District Championships	2–2	1–3	3–1	2–2	0–1	1–0	—	1–1
8	Juventude de Évora (R)	14	2	5	7	16	27	−11	21	Relegation to District Championships	2–4	1–2	1–1	0–1	2–1	2–0	2–2	—

Rules for classification: 1) Points, 2) Head-to-head points, 3) Head-to-head goal difference, 4) Goal difference, 5) Matches won, 6) Goals scored
(R) Relegated

=== Relegation play-out ===
==== First round ====
21 May 2016
17:00 WEST (UTC+01:00)

Lusitânia de Lourosa	1–1	Sacavenense
António Alves 26'		Léo Mofreita 22'

Estádio do Lusitânia FC Lourosa, Lourosa
Referee: António Nobre
29 May 2016
17:00 WEST (UTC+01:00)

Sacavenense	2–1 (a.e.t.)	Lusitânia de Lourosa
Ricardo Santos 66' (pen.); Léo Mofreita 109'		Pedro Silva 38'

Campo do Sacavenense, Sacavém
Referee: Nuno Alvo

Lusitânia da Lourosa lost 3–2 on aggregate and were relegated.

21 May 2016
17:00 WEST (UTC+01:00)

AD Nogueirense	2–0	Atlético de Reguengos
Bernardo Abrantes 5'; Toni Loureiro 83'

Estádio de Santo António, Nogueira do Cravo (Oliveira do Hospital)
Referee: Cláudio Pereira
29 May 2016
17:00 WEST (UTC+01:00)

Atlético de Reguengos	2–2	AD Nogueirense
Wilson Gonçalves 36' (pen.); Kaly 90+2' (pen.)		Gilberto Barbosa 51'; Bernardo Abrantes 90+5'

Campo Virgílio Durão, Reguengos de Monsaraz
Referee: Bruno Vieira

Atlético de Reguengos lost 4–2 on aggregate and were relegated.

21 May 2016
17:00 WEST (UTC+01:00)

Vila Real	2–1	Arões
Pipo 1' (pen.); George Ofosu 80'		Pedro Silva 68'

Complexo Desportivo do Monte da Forca, Vila Real
Referee: Humberto Teixeira
29 May 2016
17:00 WEST (UTC+01:00)

Arões	3–1	Vila Real
Bruno Barbosa 5'; Miguel Ribeiro 33'; Zé Pedro 89'		Djo Djo 13'

Parque Desportivo do CFJA, São Romão de Arões (Fafe)
Referee: Hugo Pacheco

Vila Real lost 4–3 on aggregate and were relegated.

21 May 2016
17:00 WEST (UTC+01:00)

Vianense	0–0	Águias do Moradal

Estádio Dr. José de Matos, Viana do Castelo
Referee: António Moreira
29 May 2016
17:00 WEST (UTC+01:00)

Águias do Moradal	5–2	Vianense
Henrique Pinto 39', 86'; Armando Freitas 52' (pen.); Fábio Mariano 77', 88'		Ruca Ferreira 30', 80'

Campo do Ventoso, Estreito (Oleiros)
Referee: Fernando Lopes

Vianense lost 5–2 on aggregate and were relegated.

==== Second round ====
4 June 2016
17:00 WEST (UTC+01:00)

Arões	1–1	AD Nogueirense
Bruno Barbosa 53'		Toni Loureiro 88'

Parque Desportivo do CFJA, São Romão de Arões (Fafe)
Referee: Hugo Silva
10 June 2016
17:00 WEST (UTC+01:00)

AD Nogueirense	0–0 (a.e.t.)	Arões
Penalties
(penalty scored); Mário Jorge (penalty missed) (penalty scored) (penalty scored) (penalty scored) (penalty scored)	5–4	(penalty scored); (penalty missed) Zezé (penalty scored) (penalty scored) (penalty scored); (penalty missed) Gutti

Estádio de Santo António, Nogueira do Cravo (Oliveira do Hospital)
Referee: Pedro Vilaça

1–1 on aggregate. Arões lost 5–4 on penalties and were relegated.

4 June 2016
17:00 WEST (UTC+01:00)

Sacavenense	0–0	Águias do Moradal

Campo do Sacavenense, Sacavém
Referee: André Gralha
10 June 2016
17:00 WEST (UTC+01:00)

Águias do Moradal	0–3	Sacavenense
		Léo Mofreita 35'; Cláudio Oliveira 45', 77'

Campo do Ventoso, Estreito (Oleiros)
Referee: José Rodrigues

Águias do Moradal lost 3–0 on aggregate and were relegated.
