= 2017–18 Campeonato de Portugal =

5th season of the Campeonato de Portugal football league

Campeonato de Portugal
- Season: 2017–18
- Champions: Mafra (2nd title)
- Promoted: Mafra; Farense
- Matches: 1,230

The 2017–18 Campeonato de Portugal is the fifth season of Portuguese football's renovated third-tier league, since the merging of the Segunda Divisão and Terceira Divisão in 2013, the third season under the current Campeonato de Portugal title, and the 71st season of recognised third-tier football in Portugal. A total of 80 teams compete in this division, which began on 20 August 2017 and ended on 10 June 2018.

== Format ==
The competition format consists of two stages. In the first stage, the 80 clubs will be divided in five series of 16 teams, according to geographic criteria. In each series, teams play against each other in a home-and-away double round-robin system.

In the second stage, the five best-placed teams from each first-stage series and the best three runners-up will dispute a series of playoff matches to promote to the LigaPro. The two finalists will be promoted directly. The six bottom clubs of each series will be relegated.

== Teams ==
Location of teams of the 2017–18 Campeonato de Portugal(Mainland)

Brown: Serie A; Red: Serie B; Blue: Serie C;

Yellow: Serie D; Green: Serie E.
Location of teams of the 2017–18 Campeonato de Portugal (Madeira)
Brown: Serie A; Red: Serie B; Blue: Serie C.
Location of teams of the 2017–18 Campeonato de Portugal (Azores)
Yellow: Serie D; Green: Serie E.

Relegated from the 2016–17 LigaPro:

- Vizela
- Fafe
- Freamunde
- Olhanense

From the 2016–17 Campeonato de Portugal:

- AD Oliveirense
- Bragança
- Merelinense
- Mirandela
- Montalegre
- Pedras Salgadas
- Torcatense
- Vilaverdense
- Aliança de Gandra
- Amarante
- Camacha
- Felgueiras 1932
- Marítimo B
- Pedras Rubras
- São Martinho
- Trofense
- Cesarense
- Cinfães
- Coimbrões
- Gondomar
- Salgueiros
- Sanjoanense
- Sousense
- AD Nogueirense
- Anadia
- Gafanha
- Lusitano de Vildemoinhos
- Mortágua
- Recreio de Águeda
- Benfica de Castelo Branco
- Fátima
- Oleiros
- Operário
- Sertanense
- Sporting Ideal
- União de Leiria
- Alcanenense
- Caldas
- Lusitânia
- Mafra
- Praiense
- Torreense
- Vilafranquense
- 1º de Dezembro
- Casa Pia
- Loures
- Oriental
- Sacavenense
- Sintrense
- Almancilense
- Armacenenses
- Farense
- Louletano
- Lusitano VRSA
- Moura
- Pinhalnovense

Promoted from the 2016–17 District Championships:

- Algarve FA: Moncarapachense
- Aveiro FA: Espinho
- Beja FA: Castrense
- Braga FA: Arões
- Bragança FA: Argozelo
- Castelo Branco FA: Águias do Moradal
- Coimbra FA: Sourense
- Évora FA: Estrela de Vendas Novas
- Guarda FA: Fornos de Algodres
- Leiria FA: Marinhense
- Lisboa FA: Pêro Pinheiro
- Madeira FA: Câmara de Lobos
- Portalegre FA: Elétrico Ponte de Sôr
- Porto FA: Canelas 2010
- Santarém FA: Coruchense
- Setúbal FA: Olímpico do Montijo
- Viana do Castelo FA: Alt. Arcos Valdevez
- Vila Real FA: Mondinense
- Viseu FA: Ferreira de Aves
- Liga Meo Azores: Sporting de Guadalupe

== Group stage ==
=== Serie A ===
Pos	Team	Pld	W	D	L	GF	GA	GD	Pts	Qualification or relegation
1	Vizela (Q)	30	22	7	1	53	11	+42	73	Qualification to promotion play-offs
2	Vilaverdense (Q)	30	19	7	4	65	29	+36	64	Qualification to promotion play-offs
3	Fafe	30	18	6	6	42	19	+23	60	
4	Mirandela	30	17	6	7	42	26	+16	57	
5	Merelinense	30	15	8	7	60	29	+31	53	
6	São Martinho	30	14	7	9	46	31	+15	49	
7	AD Oliveirense	30	10	14	6	41	27	+14	44	
8	Pedras Salgadas	30	10	8	12	32	35	−3	38	
9	Montalegre	30	10	8	12	39	38	+1	38	
10	Torcatense	30	10	8	12	28	36	−8	38	
11	Bragança (R)	30	8	9	13	31	43	−12	33	Relegation to District Championship
12	Câmara de Lobos (R)	30	9	3	18	27	54	−27	30	Relegation to District Championship
13	Atlético dos Arcos (R)	30	5	11	14	28	55	−27	26	Relegation to District Championship
14	Arões (R)	30	5	9	16	25	41	−16	24	Relegation to District Championship
15	Mondinense (R)	30	6	5	19	27	68	−41	23	Relegation to District Championship
16	Minas de Argozelo (R)	30	3	2	25	24	68	−44	11	Relegation to District Championship

Source: FPF.pt, Zerozero.pt
Rules for classification: 1) Points, 2) Head-to-head points, 3) Head-to-head goal difference, 4) Goal difference, 5) Matches won, 6) Goals scored
(Q) Qualified for the phase indicated; (R) Relegated

=== Serie B ===
Pos	Team	Pld	W	D	L	GF	GA	GD	Pts	Qualification or relegation
1	Felgueiras 1932 (Q)	30	16	8	6	53	28	+25	56	Qualification to promotion play-offs
2	Sp. Espinho	30	15	9	6	50	30	+20	54	
3	Gondomar	30	13	10	7	43	29	+14	49	
4	Cesarense	30	11	15	4	44	26	+18	48	
5	Cinfães	30	13	6	11	39	40	−1	45	
6	Amarante	30	12	9	9	42	33	+9	45	
7	Sanjoanense	30	10	12	8	35	30	+5	42	
8	Pedras Rubras	30	11	9	10	36	32	+4	42	
9	Trofense	30	12	6	12	34	35	−1	42	
10	Coimbrões	30	11	8	11	41	48	−7	41	
11	Canelas 2010 (R)	30	11	8	11	45	44	+1	41	Relegation to District Championship
12	Salgueiros (R)	30	7	14	9	30	34	−4	35	Relegation to District Championship
13	Camacha (R)	30	10	4	16	35	48	−13	34	Relegation to District Championship
14	Aliança Gandra (R)	30	8	5	17	24	47	−23	29	Relegation to District Championship
15	Freamunde (R)	30	6	10	14	26	31	−5	28	Relegation to District Championship
16	Sousense (R)	30	6	3	21	19	61	−42	21	Relegation to District Championship

Source: FPF.pt, Zerozero.pt
Rules for classification: 1) Points, 2) Head-to-head points, 3) Head-to-head goal difference, 4) Goal difference, 5) Matches won, 6) Goals scored
(Q) Qualified for the phase indicated; (R) Relegated

=== Serie C ===
Pos	Team	Pld	W	D	L	GF	GA	GD	Pts	Qualification or relegation
1	U. Leiria (Q)	30	23	4	3	68	21	+47	73	Qualification to promotion play-offs
2	Lusitano Vildemoinhos (Q)	30	20	5	5	47	19	+28	65	Qualification to promotion play-offs
3	Benfica Castelo Branco	30	17	8	5	48	23	+25	59	
4	Sertanense	30	15	8	7	51	22	+29	53	
5	Águeda	30	14	7	9	39	32	+7	49	
6	Gafanha	30	13	9	8	36	23	+13	48	
7	Anadia	30	12	10	8	39	28	+11	46	
8	Marítimo B	30	14	3	13	44	30	+14	45	
9	Nogueirense	30	11	9	10	37	38	−1	42	
10	Oleiros	30	12	6	12	35	36	−1	42	
11	Marinhense (R)	30	11	8	11	43	41	+2	41	Relegation to District Championship
12	Mortágua (R)	30	11	3	16	23	40	−17	36	Relegation to District Championship
13	Ferreira de Aves (R)	30	9	2	19	34	69	−35	29	Relegation to District Championship
14	Águias do Moradal (R)	30	5	6	19	29	54	−25	21	Relegation to District Championship
15	Sourense (R)	30	3	8	19	28	57	−29	17	Relegation to District Championship
16	Fornos de Algodres (R)	30	0	4	26	15	83	−68	4	Relegation to District Championship

Source: FPF.pt, Zerozero.pt
Rules for classification: 1) Points, 2) Head-to-head points, 3) Head-to-head goal difference, 4) Goal difference, 5) Matches won, 6) Goals scored
(Q) Qualified for the phase indicated; (R) Relegated

=== Serie D ===
Pos	Team	Pld	W	D	L	GF	GA	GD	Pts	Qualification or relegation
1	Mafra (Q)	30	21	6	3	61	21	+40	69	Qualification to promotion play-offs
2	Vilafranquense (Q)	30	18	9	3	53	20	+33	63	Qualification to promotion play-offs
3	Praiense	30	16	5	9	45	29	+16	53	
4	Torreense	30	13	9	8	48	33	+15	48	
5	Sacavenense	30	13	8	9	36	23	+13	47	
6	Fátima	30	12	9	9	49	38	+11	45	
7	Loures	30	10	12	8	35	38	−3	42	
8	Caldas (Note: Caldas were deducted 3 points due to failing to appear to a match against Praiense.)	30	12	8	10	34	37	−3	41	
9	1º de Dezembro	30	9	11	10	35	36	−1	38	
10	Sintrense	30	10	8	12	37	41	−4	38	
11	Pêro Pinheiro (R)	30	8	10	12	23	44	−21	34	Relegation to District Championship
12	Coruchense (R)	30	9	7	14	27	44	−17	34	Relegation to District Championship
13	Lusitânia (R)	30	8	7	15	32	50	−18	31	Relegation to District Championship
14	Alcanenense (R)	30	8	5	17	32	46	−14	29	Relegation to District Championship
15	Eléctrico (R)	30	3	12	15	28	44	−16	21	Relegation to District Championship
16	Sp. de Guadalupe (R)	30	4	6	20	26	57	−31	18	Relegation to District Championship

Source: FPF.pt, Zerozero.pt
Rules for classification: 1) Points, 2) Head-to-head points, 3) Head-to-head goal difference, 4) Goal difference, 5) Matches won, 6) Goals scored
(Q) Qualified for the phase indicated; (R) Relegated

=== Serie E ===
Pos	Team	Pld	W	D	L	GF	GA	GD	Pts	Qualification or relegation
1	Farense (Q)	30	26	3	1	66	12	+54	81	Qualification to promotion play-offs
2	Oriental	30	19	6	5	40	19	+21	63	
3	Olhanense	30	18	4	8	42	30	+12	58	
4	Casa Pia	30	16	5	9	50	31	+19	53	
5	Pinhalnovense	30	13	7	10	43	29	+14	46	
6	Louletano	30	13	5	12	43	39	+4	44	
7	Armacenenses	30	11	11	8	31	29	+2	44	
8	Moura	30	12	5	13	41	38	+3	41	
9	Olímpico do Montijo	30	9	10	11	40	44	−4	37	
10	Sp. Ideal	30	10	5	15	29	38	−9	35	
11	Estrela de Vendas Novas (R)	30	8	8	14	32	54	−22	32	Relegation to District Championship
12	Operário (R)	30	7	9	14	35	46	−11	30	Relegation to District Championship
13	Almancilense (R)	30	7	7	16	33	50	−17	28	Relegation to District Championship
14	Castrense (R)	30	5	11	14	32	47	−15	26	Relegation to District Championship
15	Lusitano VRSA (R)	30	6	7	17	24	49	−25	25	Relegation to District Championship
16	Moncarapachense (R)	30	6	5	19	27	53	−26	23	Relegation to District Championship

Source: FPF.pt, Zerozero.pt
Rules for classification: 1) Points, 2) Head-to-head points, 3) Head-to-head goal difference, 4) Goal difference, 5) Matches won, 6) Goals scored
(Q) Qualified for the phase indicated; (R) Relegated

=== Ranking of second-placed teams ===
Pos	Serie	Team	Pld	W	D	L	GF	GA	GD	Pts	Qualification
1	C	Lusitano Vildemoinhos (Q)	30	20	5	5	47	19	+28	65	Qualification to promotion play-offs
2	A	Vilaverdense (Q)	30	19	7	4	65	29	+36	64	Qualification to promotion play-offs
3	D	Vilafranquense (Q)	30	18	9	3	53	20	+33	63	Qualification to promotion play-offs
4	E	Oriental	30	19	6	5	40	19	+21	63	
5	B	Sp. Espinho	30	15	9	6	50	30	+20	54	

Source: FPF.pt, Zerozero.pt
Rules for classification: 1) Points, 2) Goal difference, 3) Matches won, 4) Goals scored
(Q) Qualified for the phase indicated

== Knockout stage ==
Qualified Clubs to PlayOff

The 5 winners and the best 3 runners-up were qualified to the knockout stage, where the winning team and the runner-up were promoted to Segunda Liga.

=== Bracket ===
Quarter-finals
6/13 May 2018
Mafra	2	4	6
Vilaverdense	1	2	3
6/13 May 2018
U. Leiria	3	1	4
Lusitano Vildemoinhos	1	0	1
6/13 May 2018
Felgueiras 1932	2	1	3
Farense (a)	3	0	3
6/13 May 2018
Vilafranquense (a.e.t.)	0	2	2
Vizela	1	0	1

Semi-finals
19/27 May 2018
Mafra (a)	0	1	1
U. Leiria	0	1	1
19/27 May 2018
Farense	3	1	4
Vilafranquense	0	1	1

Final
10 June 2018 – Estádio Nacional
Mafra	2
Farense	1

=== Final ===
10 June 2018
17:00 WEST

Mafra	2–1	Farense
Ricardo Rodrigues 71'; Juary Soares 90'	Report	Fábio Gomes 6'

Estádio Nacional, Oeiras
Attendance: 10018
Referee: Hélder Lamas
