= 2014–15 Campeonato Nacional de Seniores =

2nd season of the Campeonato Nacional de Seniores football league

Campeonato Nacional de Seniores
- Season: 2014–15
- Champions: Mafra
- Promoted: Mafra; Famalicão; Varzim

The 2014–15 Campeonato Nacional de Seniores was the second season of the third-tier football league in Portugal, and the 68th season of recognised third-tier football in Portugal. It began on August 24, 2014 and finished on June 14, 2015.

== Overview ==
The league was divided in eight series of 10 clubs placed geographically, with the exception of teams from Madeira Islands (divided through the first series) and from the Azores Islands (divided through the last series).

After a First Stage in a home-and-away system, the first two best placed teams of each league played in two groups of 8 teams in a Second Stage with each league winner earning a promotion to the LigaPro, plus a two-round play-off winner between the two second placed teams. The two group winners then played a Grand Final on neutral ground for the overall Campeonato Nacional title.

The remaining 8 clubs from each league from the First Stage played in 8 different groups with the last two placed teams being relegated to the Districts Championships. The 6th placed teams from those leagues then played a two-round play-off with between themselves to decide the remaining four clubs to be relegated.

== Teams ==
Qualified teams:

No team was relegated from Segunda Liga in this season (due to the Segunda Liga increasing number of teams).

From 2013–14 CNS:

- Fafe
- Bragança
- Mirandela
- Santa Maria
- Vianense
- Vilaverdense
- Limianos
- Pedras Salgadas
- Varzim
- Tirsense
- Famalicão
- Vizela
- Oliveirense
- Ribeirão
- Amarante
- Felgueiras 1932
- Sp. Espinho
- Cinfães
- Gondomar
- Lusitânia Lourosa
- Coimbrões
- Sousense
- Salgueiros 08
- Anadia
- Cesarense
- Estarreja
- S. J. Vêr
- Camacha
- Lusitano FCV
- Naval
- Benf. Castelo Branco
- Pampilhosa
- Sourense
- Tourizense
- Nogueirense
- U. Leiria
- Torreense
- Caldas
- Fátima
- At. Riachense
- Sertanense
- Mafra
- Alcanenense
- Casa Pia
- 1.º Dezembro
- Loures
- Pinhalnovense
- Sintrense
- U. Montemor
- Cova da Piedade
- Louletano
- Moura
- Quarteirense
- Operário (Açores)
- Praiense
- Ferreiras

Promoted from the District Championships:

- Algarve FA: Lusitano VRSA
- Aveiro FA: Sanjoanense and Gafanha
- Beja FA: Aljustrelense
- Braga FA: Vieira S.C. and CCD Santa Eulália
- Bragança FA: no representation
- Castelo Branco FA: Vit. Sernache
- Coimbra FA: Oliv. Hospital
- Évora FA: Atl. Reguengos
- Guarda FA: CD Gouveia
- Leiria FA: Sp. Pombal
- Lisboa FA: At. Malveira and Sacavenense
- Madeira FA: Marítimo C
- Portalegre FA: Eléctrico
- Porto FA: FC Pedras Rubras and Sobrado
- Santarém FA: Atl. Ouriense
- Setúbal FA: Fabril Barreiro
- Viana do Castelo FA: Cerveira
- Vila Real FA: Vila Real
- Viseu FA: Moimenta da Beira e Mortágua
- Azores League: Angrense

== First stage ==
=== Serie A ===
| Pos | Team | Pld | W | D | L | GF | GA | GD | Pts | Qualification | FAF | MIR | VIL | PED | BRA | CER | VIA | STM | LIM | VIE |
|---|---|---|---|---|---|---|---|---|---|---|---|---|---|---|---|---|---|---|---|---|
| 1 | Fafe (A) | 18 | 10 | 7 | 1 | 28 | 10 | +18 | 37 | Promotion Zone | | 2–0 | 1–1 | 1–0 | 0–0 | 4–0 | 1–2 | 2–1 | 0–0 | 5–0 |
| 2 | Mirandela (A) | 18 | 10 | 5 | 3 | 23 | 12 | +11 | 35 | Promotion Zone | 2–2 | | 0–0 | 0–0 | 1–1 | 3–1 | 2–1 | 0–1 | 1–0 | 2–0 |
| 3 | Vilaverdense | 18 | 7 | 8 | 3 | 17 | 15 | +2 | 29 | Relegation Zone | 1–1 | 0–2 | | 1–0 | 0–1 | 2–2 | 1–0 | 0–0 | 1–0 | 1–0 |
| 4 | Pedras Salgadas | 18 | 6 | 7 | 5 | 22 | 14 | +8 | 25 | Relegation Zone | 1–1 | 0–1 | 1–1 | | 1–0 | 4–0 | 2–2 | 1–0 | 0–0 | 1–1 |
| 5 | Bragança | 18 | 6 | 7 | 5 | 19 | 17 | +2 | 25 | Relegation Zone | 0–0 | 2–3 | 2–3 | 2–1 | | 0–0 | 1–1 | 2–1 | 2–0 | 2–2 |
| 6 | Cerveira | 18 | 6 | 5 | 7 | 20 | 27 | −7 | 23 | Relegation Zone | 0–1 | 1–1 | 1–1 | 2–1 | 2–0 | | 1–3 | 0–2 | 3–0 | 0–0 |
| 7 | Vianense | 18 | 5 | 6 | 7 | 24 | 27 | −3 | 21 | Relegation Zone | 0–1 | 0–1 | 1–2 | 2–4 | 0–2 | 2–1 | | 1–1 | 1–1 | 1–0 |
| 8 | Santa Maria | 18 | 4 | 7 | 7 | 17 | 19 | −2 | 19 | Relegation Zone | 2–3 | 1–0 | 1–1 | 0–0 | 0–1 | 0–1 | 2–3 | | 2–1 | 2–2 |
| 9 | Limianos | 18 | 3 | 5 | 10 | 12 | 24 | −12 | 14 | Relegation Zone | 0–2 | 0–1 | 0–1 | 0–3 | 2–1 | 2–3 | 3–3 | 0–0 | | 1–0 |
| 10 | Vieira | 18 | 1 | 7 | 10 | 10 | 27 | −17 | 10 | Relegation Zone | 0–1 | 0–3 | 2–0 | 0–2 | 0–0 | 1–2 | 1–1 | 1–1 | 0–2 | |

Rules for classification: 1) points; 2) goal difference; 3) number of goals scored.
(A) Advance to a further round

=== Serie B ===
| Pos | Team | Pld | W | D | L | GF | GA | GD | Pts | Qualification | FAM | VAR | VIZ | FEL | ADO | AMA | TIR | STE | RIB | VRE |
|---|---|---|---|---|---|---|---|---|---|---|---|---|---|---|---|---|---|---|---|---|
| 1 | Famalicão (A) | 18 | 12 | 3 | 3 | 32 | 14 | +18 | 39 | Promotion Zone | | 2–2 | 1–0 | 0–1 | 1–2 | 3–0 | 2–0 | 2–1 | 4–2 | 5–0 |
| 2 | Varzim (A) | 18 | 12 | 3 | 3 | 36 | 13 | +23 | 39 | Promotion Zone | 2–0 | | 1–1 | 3–0 | 3–1 | 1–0 | 2–0 | 3–1 | 3–0 | 3–2 |
| 3 | Vizela | 18 | 12 | 3 | 3 | 27 | 7 | +20 | 39 | Relegation Zone | 0–1 | 1–0 | | 2–1 | 2–0 | 2–0 | 2–0 | 3–0 | 1–0 | 3–0 |
| 4 | Felgueiras 1932 | 18 | 9 | 6 | 3 | 24 | 19 | +5 | 33 | Relegation Zone | 0–0 | 1–0 | 0–1 | | 1–0 | 3–2 | 1–0 | 1–0 | 5–3 | 4–3 |
| 5 | Oliveirense | 18 | 6 | 6 | 6 | 23 | 22 | +1 | 24 | Relegation Zone | 1–2 | 3–2 | 1–0 | 1–2 | | 0–0 | 0–0 | 0–0 | 5–1 | 2–3 |
| 6 | Amarante | 18 | 5 | 5 | 8 | 19 | 25 | −6 | 20 | Relegation Zone | 0–3 | 0–2 | 0–2 | 1–1 | 0–0 | | 2–0 | 3–3 | 1–3 | 3–0 |
| 7 | Tirsense | 18 | 3 | 9 | 6 | 9 | 14 | −5 | 18 | Relegation Zone | 2–2 | 0–0 | 1–1 | 1–1 | 0–1 | 0–0 | | 1–0 | 1–0 | 3–0 |
| 8 | CCD Santa Eulália | 18 | 2 | 7 | 9 | 17 | 31 | −14 | 13 | Relegation Zone | 1–2 | 1–5 | 1–1 | 1–1 | 2–2 | 0–2 | 0–0 | | 2–0 | 0–2 |
| 9 | Ribeirão | 18 | 2 | 4 | 12 | 17 | 37 | −20 | 10 | Relegation Zone | 0–1 | 0–1 | 0–3 | 0–0 | 2–2 | 1–3 | 0–0 | 2–3 | | 2–1 |
| 10 | Vila Real | 18 | 2 | 4 | 12 | 16 | 38 | −22 | 10 | Relegation Zone | 0–1 | 0–3 | 0–2 | 1–1 | 1–2 | 1–2 | 0–0 | 1–1 | 1–1 | |

Rules for classification: 1) points; 2) goal difference; 3) number of goals scored.
(A) Advance to a further round

=== Serie C ===
| Pos | Team | Pld | W | D | L | GF | GA | GD | Pts | Qualification | SAL | SOU | CIN | COI | GON | SOB | LOU | MOI | PED | ESP |
|---|---|---|---|---|---|---|---|---|---|---|---|---|---|---|---|---|---|---|---|---|
| 1 | Salgueiros 08 (A) | 18 | 10 | 6 | 2 | 27 | 10 | +17 | 36 | Promotion Zone | | 1–0 | 1–1 | 4–0 | 1–2 | 0–0 | 3–1 | 3–0 | 3–0 | 2–2 |
| 2 | Sousense (A) | 18 | 11 | 1 | 6 | 37 | 21 | +16 | 34 | Promotion Zone | 0–1 | | 3–2 | 3–1 | 2–1 | 1–3 | 3–1 | 2–1 | 3–0 | 4–1 |
| 3 | Cinfães | 18 | 8 | 7 | 3 | 26 | 16 | +10 | 31 | Relegation Zone | 1–1 | 2–1 | | 1–1 | 3–0 | 2–1 | 1–0 | 3–1 | 3–1 | 1–1 |
| 4 | Coimbrões | 18 | 8 | 6 | 4 | 27 | 21 | +6 | 30 | Relegation Zone | 1–0 | 2–0 | 3–2 | | 1–1 | 0–0 | 3–0 | 1–3 | 2–0 | 2–0 |
| 5 | Gondomar | 18 | 7 | 6 | 5 | 18 | 17 | +1 | 27 | Relegation Zone | 0–0 | 0–2 | 1–0 | 2–2 | | 1–0 | 1–1 | 1–0 | 3–1 | 3–1 |
| 6 | Sobrado | 18 | 5 | 8 | 5 | 25 | 21 | +4 | 23 | Relegation Zone | 1–2 | 1–1 | 1–2 | 1–1 | 1–1 | | 2–1 | 2–2 | 2–1 | 2–1 |
| 7 | Lusitânia Lourosa | 18 | 6 | 2 | 10 | 16 | 23 | −7 | 20 | Relegation Zone | 0–0 | 2–1 | 0–1 | 1–0 | 1–0 | 2–1 | | 0–1 | 4–0 | 1–0 |
| 8 | Moimenta da Beira | 18 | 4 | 4 | 10 | 19 | 36 | −17 | 16 | Relegation Zone | 0–1 | 1–4 | 0–0 | 1–1 | 1–0 | 2–7 | 3–0 | | 0–4 | 2–2 |
| 9 | FC Pedras Rubras | 18 | 4 | 3 | 11 | 15 | 32 | −17 | 15 | Relegation Zone | 1–2 | 0–4 | 1–1 | 2–3 | 0–0 | 0–0 | 1–0 | 2–1 | | 1–0 |
| 10 | Sp. Espinho | 18 | 3 | 5 | 10 | 14 | 27 | −13 | 14 | Relegation Zone | 0–2 | 1–2 | 0–0 | 0–2 | 0–1 | 0–0 | 2–1 | 2–1 | 1–0 | |

Rules for classification: 1) points; 2) goal difference; 3) number of goals scored.
(A) Advance to a further round

=== Serie D ===
| Pos | Team | Pld | W | D | L | GF | GA | GD | Pts | Qualification | LVD | CSA | EST | MAR | SAN | ANA | CAM | GOU | GAF | SJV |
|---|---|---|---|---|---|---|---|---|---|---|---|---|---|---|---|---|---|---|---|---|
| 1 | Lusitano FCV (A) | 18 | 9 | 7 | 2 | 27 | 13 | +14 | 34 | Promotion Zone | | 3–1 | 3–2 | 1–0 | 1–0 | 2–0 | 1–1 | 4–1 | 3–0 | 2–1 |
| 2 | Cesarense (A) | 18 | 9 | 7 | 2 | 30 | 15 | +15 | 34 | Promotion Zone | 0–0 | | 2–1 | 2–1 | 0–1 | 1–1 | 5–2 | 2–0 | 1–0 | 0–0 |
| 3 | Estarreja | 18 | 8 | 6 | 4 | 27 | 20 | +7 | 30 | Relegation Zone | 2–1 | 1–1 | | 1–1 | 1–3 | 4–1 | 2–2 | 2–1 | 2–0 | 2–0 |
| 4 | Marítimo C | 18 | 7 | 3 | 8 | 20 | 19 | +1 | 24 | Relegation Zone | 1–1 | 1–1 | 0–1 | | 1–0 | 1–0 | 0–1 | 2–1 | 2–3 | 0–1 |
| 5 | Sanjoanense | 18 | 6 | 6 | 6 | 17 | 17 | 0 | 24 | Relegation Zone | 2–2 | 1–3 | 2–2 | 1–0 | | 2–1 | 0–1 | 0–0 | 2–1 | 0–0 |
| 6 | Anadia | 18 | 5 | 6 | 7 | 17 | 17 | 0 | 21 | Relegation Zone | 0–0 | 1–1 | 1–0 | 1–2 | 1–0 | | 1–1 | 0–1 | 1–1 | 3–0 |
| 7 | Camacha | 18 | 4 | 8 | 6 | 13 | 15 | −2 | 20 | Relegation Zone | 0–1 | 1–1 | 0–1 | 0–1 | 0–0 | 0–0 | | 3–0 | 0–0 | 0–1 |
| 8 | Gouveia | 18 | 5 | 5 | 8 | 17 | 26 | −9 | 20 | Relegation Zone | 1–1 | 0–4 | 1–1 | 3–1 | 2–1 | 0–2 | 0–0 | | 1–2 | 3–0 |
| 9 | Gafanha | 18 | 4 | 6 | 8 | 15 | 22 | −7 | 18 | Relegation Zone | 1–1 | 0–1 | 1–2 | 1–2 | 1–1 | 1–0 | 0–1 | 1–1 | | 1–0 |
| 10 | S. João Vêr | 18 | 4 | 4 | 10 | 7 | 25 | −18 | 16 | Relegation Zone | 1–0 | 1–4 | 0–0 | 0–4 | 0–1 | 0–3 | 1–0 | 0–1 | 1–1 | |

Rules for classification: 1) points; 2) goal difference; 3) number of goals scored.
(A) Advance to a further round

=== Serie E ===
| Pos | Team | Pld | W | D | L | GF | GA | GD | Pts | Qualification | BCB | NOG | SER | SOU | PAM | HOS | NAV | POM | TOU | MOR |
|---|---|---|---|---|---|---|---|---|---|---|---|---|---|---|---|---|---|---|---|---|
| 1 | Benf. Castelo Branco (A) | 18 | 13 | 3 | 2 | 34 | 13 | +21 | 42 | Promotion Zone | | 2–3 | 1–1 | 1–0 | 3–0 | 5–0 | 2–0 | 1–1 | 2–0 | 2–0 |
| 2 | Nogueirense (A) | 18 | 9 | 3 | 6 | 27 | 22 | +5 | 30 | Promotion Zone | 2–3 | | 2–0 | 3–2 | 3–0 | 0–0 | 4–0 | 1–3 | 2–1 | 1–0 |
| 3 | Vit. Sernache | 18 | 7 | 7 | 4 | 20 | 14 | +6 | 28 | Relegation Zone | 3–1 | 0–0 | | 0–0 | 1–0 | 0–0 | 1–1 | 3–0 | 2–0 | 0–0 |
| 4 | Sourense | 18 | 8 | 3 | 7 | 20 | 18 | +2 | 27 | Relegation Zone | 2–3 | 3–1 | 1–0 | | 1–0 | 1–0 | 3–1 | 3–1 | 0–1 | 1–0 |
| 5 | Pampilhosa | 18 | 8 | 3 | 7 | 17 | 17 | 0 | 27 | Relegation Zone | 0–1 | 1–0 | 0–1 | 0–0 | | 2–1 | 5–0 | 1–0 | 2–1 | 2–1 |
| 6 | Oliv. Hospital | 18 | 5 | 9 | 4 | 22 | 21 | +1 | 24 | Relegation Zone | 0–0 | 1–1 | 2–2 | 0–0 | 2–0 | | 3–0 | 3–0 | 2–2 | 1–1 |
| 7 | Naval | 18 | 7 | 2 | 9 | 16 | 24 | −8 | 23 | Relegation Zone | 0–2 | 2–0 | 1–0 | 2–0 | 0–1 | 0–1 | | 2–0 | 0–2 | 3–0 |
| 8 | Sp. Pombal | 18 | 5 | 4 | 9 | 19 | 28 | −9 | 19 | Relegation Zone | 1–2 | 0–1 | 2–1 | 3–1 | 1–1 | 4–4 | 0–2 | | 0–1 | 1–1 |
| 9 | Tourizense | 18 | 5 | 3 | 10 | 19 | 21 | −2 | 18 | Relegation Zone | 0–1 | 4–0 | 1–2 | 1–2 | 1–1 | 2–0 | 0–0 | 0–1 | | 1–2 |
| 10 | Mortágua | 18 | 3 | 3 | 12 | 11 | 27 | −16 | 12 | Relegation Zone | 0–2 | 0–3 | 2–3 | 1–0 | 0–1 | 1–2 | 0–2 | 0–1 | 2–1 | |

Rules for classification: 1) points; 2) goal difference; 3) number of goals scored.
(A) Advance to a further round

=== Serie F ===
| Pos | Team | Pld | W | D | L | GF | GA | GD | Pts | Qualification | CAL | MAF | LEI | SER | ELE | TOR | ALC | FAT | RIA | OUR |
|---|---|---|---|---|---|---|---|---|---|---|---|---|---|---|---|---|---|---|---|---|
| 1 | Caldas (A) | 18 | 10 | 6 | 2 | 32 | 14 | +18 | 36 | Promotion Zone | | 2–0 | 0–0 | 1–1 | 2–2 | 0–1 | 5–1 | 1–0 | 2–1 | 2–0 |
| 2 | Mafra (A) | 18 | 11 | 3 | 4 | 28 | 12 | +16 | 36 | Promotion Zone | 1–2 | | 3–1 | 1–1 | 2–1 | 1–0 | 1–1 | 4–1 | 2–0 | 3–0 |
| 3 | União de Leiria | 18 | 10 | 3 | 5 | 31 | 20 | +11 | 33 | Relegation Zone | 1–3 | 0–1 | | 2–1 | 1–1 | 2–0 | 2–0 | 2–0 | 7–1 | 2–0 |
| 4 | Sertanense | 18 | 8 | 7 | 3 | 27 | 19 | +8 | 31 | Relegation Zone | 0–1 | 1–0 | 3–1 | | 1–2 | 2–2 | 1–0 | 1–0 | 1–0 | 4–2 |
| 5 | Eléctrico | 18 | 7 | 8 | 3 | 22 | 14 | +8 | 29 | Relegation Zone | 1–0 | 1–1 | 0–1 | 0–0 | | 0–0 | 2–1 | 0–0 | 4–0 | 3–0 |
| 6 | Torreense | 18 | 7 | 7 | 4 | 18 | 13 | +5 | 28 | Relegation Zone | 0–0 | 0–1 | 2–1 | 2–2 | 3–0 | | 3–1 | 0–0 | 1–0 | 2–1 |
| 7 | Alcanenense | 18 | 7 | 2 | 9 | 26 | 26 | 0 | 23 | Relegation Zone | 2–2 | 1–0 | 1–2 | 1–2 | 0–1 | 1–0 | | 1–0 | 4–0 | 3–2 |
| 8 | Fátima | 18 | 3 | 8 | 7 | 19 | 27 | −8 | 17 | Relegation Zone | 1–1 | 0–5 | 2–2 | 1–1 | 1–1 | 0–0 | 2–1 | | 3–3 | 3–1 |
| 9 | At. Riachense | 18 | 1 | 4 | 13 | 16 | 43 | −27 | 7 | Relegation Zone | 2–3 | 0–1 | 2–3 | 2–2 | 1–1 | 1–2 | 0–2 | 1–4 | | 0–0 |
| 10 | Atl. Ouriense | 18 | 1 | 2 | 15 | 11 | 42 | −31 | 5 | Relegation Zone | 0–4 | 0–1 | 0–1 | 1–3 | 0–2 | 0–0 | 1–5 | 2–1 | 1–2 | |

Rules for classification: 1) points; 2) goal difference; 3) number of goals scored.
(A) Advance to a further round

=== Serie G ===
| Pos | Team | Pld | W | D | L | GF | GA | GD | Pts | Qualification | 1DZ | CPI | COV | MOM | LOU | SAC | MAL | PIN | SIN | FAB |
|---|---|---|---|---|---|---|---|---|---|---|---|---|---|---|---|---|---|---|---|---|
| 1 | 1.º de Dezembro (A) | 18 | 10 | 5 | 3 | 28 | 15 | +13 | 35 | Promotion Zone | | 0–2 | 0–0 | 1–4 | 2–1 | 1–0 | 0–1 | 4–0 | 4–1 | 2–0 |
| 2 | Casa Pia (A) | 18 | 9 | 4 | 5 | 18 | 11 | +7 | 31 | Promotion Zone | 1–3 | | 0–1 | 1–0 | 1–1 | 3–0 | 1–0 | 0–0 | 0–1 | 1–1 |
| 3 | Cova da Piedade | 18 | 8 | 4 | 6 | 17 | 15 | +2 | 28 | Relegation Zone | 0–1 | 0–1 | | 1–2 | 0–1 | 1–0 | 2–0 | 2–1 | 1–0 | 3–0 |
| 4 | U. Montemor | 18 | 8 | 2 | 8 | 24 | 22 | +2 | 26 | Relegation Zone | 1–1 | 1–0 | 0–1 | | 0–0 | 0–2 | 3–2 | 1–0 | 1–2 | 3–0 |
| 5 | Loures | 18 | 6 | 6 | 6 | 22 | 18 | +4 | 24 | Relegation Zone | 2–2 | 0–0 | 3–0 | 1–0 | | 3–2 | 1–2 | 1–1 | 3–0 | 2–0 |
| 6 | Sacavenense | 18 | 6 | 6 | 6 | 20 | 20 | 0 | 24 | Relegation Zone | 2–2 | 1–0 | 0–0 | 2–1 | 3–2 | | 0–0 | 2–0 | 1–2 | 1–1 |
| 7 | At. Malveira | 18 | 6 | 5 | 7 | 20 | 21 | −1 | 23 | Relegation Zone | 0–0 | 1–2 | 2–2 | 4–0 | 2–1 | 0–0 | | 2–4 | 0–1 | 1–0 |
| 8 | Pinhalnovense | 18 | 5 | 6 | 7 | 14 | 18 | −4 | 21 | Relegation Zone | 0–1 | 0–2 | 2–0 | 1–0 | 0–0 | 1–1 | 0–1 | | 2–0 | 0–0 |
| 9 | Sintrense | 18 | 6 | 3 | 9 | 18 | 27 | −9 | 21 | Relegation Zone | 0–2 | 0–2 | 1–1 | 2–3 | 2–0 | 2–0 | 2–2 | 0–1 | | 1–1 |
| 10 | Fabril Barreiro | 18 | 3 | 5 | 10 | 15 | 29 | −14 | 14 | Relegation Zone | 1–2 | 1–2 | 1–2 | 1–4 | 1–0 | 1–3 | 2–0 | 1–1 | 3–1 | |

Rules for classification: 1) points; 2) goal difference; 3) number of goals scored.
(A) Advance to a further round

=== Serie H ===
| Pos | Team | Pld | W | D | L | GF | GA | GD | Pts | Qualification | OPE | LOU | ANG | LUS | PRA | MOU | FER | ALJ | QUA | REG |
|---|---|---|---|---|---|---|---|---|---|---|---|---|---|---|---|---|---|---|---|---|
| 1 | Operário (A) | 18 | 15 | 1 | 2 | 39 | 10 | +29 | 46 | Promotion Zone | | 2–0 | 5–0 | 4–0 | 5–1 | 1–0 | 3–0 | 4–2 | 1–0 | 0–0 |
| 2 | Louletano (A) | 18 | 12 | 2 | 4 | 28 | 13 | +15 | 38 | Promotion Zone | 2–4 | | 1–0 | 2–0 | 3–0 | 1–0 | 4–2 | 1–1 | 1–0 | 2–1 |
| 3 | Angrense | 18 | 11 | 3 | 4 | 30 | 19 | +11 | 36 | Relegation Zone | 2–0 | 2–1 | | 3–0 | 4–0 | 1–1 | 1–2 | 1–0 | 1–1 | 2–1 |
| 4 | Lusitano VRSA | 18 | 8 | 3 | 7 | 20 | 30 | −10 | 27 | Relegation Zone | 2–1 | 0–4 | 2–2 | | 1–0 | 0–0 | 2–1 | 1–1 | 1–0 | 4–0 |
| 5 | Praiense | 18 | 8 | 1 | 9 | 22 | 31 | −9 | 25 | Relegation Zone | 0–2 | 0–1 | 0–1 | 4–1 | | 2–0 | 3–2 | 1–0 | 2–2 | 3–2 |
| 6 | Moura | 18 | 6 | 4 | 8 | 14 | 16 | −2 | 22 | Relegation Zone | 0–1 | 0–1 | 4–1 | 1–2 | 2–0 | | 1–2 | 0–3 | 1–0 | 1–0 |
| 7 | Ferreiras | 18 | 5 | 4 | 9 | 19 | 26 | −7 | 19 | Relegation Zone | 1–2 | 2–0 | 0–1 | 0–2 | 1–2 | 0–0 | | 2–1 | 1–2 | 1–1 |
| 8 | Aljustrelense | 18 | 4 | 5 | 9 | 19 | 28 | −9 | 17 | Relegation Zone | 0–2 | 0–3 | 0–3 | 2–0 | 3–1 | 1–1 | 1–1 | | 1–1 | 3–1 |
| 9 | Quarteirense | 18 | 3 | 4 | 11 | 11 | 20 | −9 | 13 | Relegation Zone | 0–1 | 0–1 | 0–3 | 1–0 | 1–2 | 0–1 | 0–0 | 2–0 | | 1–2 |
| 10 | Atl. Reguengos | 18 | 3 | 3 | 12 | 17 | 26 | −9 | 12 | Relegation Zone | 0–2 | 0–0 | 1–2 | 1–2 | 0–1 | 0–1 | 0–1 | 3–0 | 1–0 | |

Rules for classification: 1) points; 2) goal difference; 3) number of goals scored.
(A) Advance to a further round

== Second stage ==
=== Promotion groups ===
==== North Zone ====
| Pos | Team | Pld | W | D | L | GF | GA | GD | Pts | Promotion or qualification | FAM | VAR | FAF | SOU | MIR | SAL | CSA | LVD |
|---|---|---|---|---|---|---|---|---|---|---|---|---|---|---|---|---|---|---|
| 1 | Famalicão (P) | 14 | 12 | 2 | 0 | 25 | 3 | +22 | 38 | Promotion to 2015–16 LigaPro | | 2–1 | 2–1 | 5–0 | 2–0 | 2–0 | 1–0 | 1–0 |
| 2 | Varzim (P) | 14 | 9 | 3 | 2 | 23 | 10 | +13 | 30 | Third Place Playoff | 0–0 | | 1–0 | 3–2 | 3–1 | 2–0 | 3–0 | 0–0 |
| 3 | Fafe | 14 | 7 | 3 | 4 | 19 | 14 | +5 | 24 | | 0–0 | 2–1 | | 4–0 | 0–4 | 3–2 | 3–1 | 1–0 |
| 4 | Sousense | 14 | 4 | 4 | 6 | 12 | 26 | −14 | 16 | | 0–2 | 2–2 | 0–0 | | 2–1 | 0–0 | 2–2 | 1–0 |
| 5 | Mirandela | 14 | 5 | 0 | 9 | 15 | 15 | 0 | 15 | | 0–1 | 1–2 | 1–0 | 3–0 | | 1–0 | 0–1 | 2–0 |
| 6 | Salgueiros 08 | 14 | 4 | 3 | 7 | 13 | 17 | −4 | 15 | | 1–2 | 0–2 | 0–0 | 3–0 | 2–1 | | 2–1 | 2–1 |
| 7 | Cesarense | 14 | 3 | 2 | 9 | 10 | 23 | −13 | 11 | | 0–4 | 0–2 | 1–2 | 0–1 | 1–0 | 0–0 | | 1–0 |
| 8 | Lusitano FCV | 14 | 3 | 1 | 10 | 9 | 18 | −9 | 10 | | 0–1 | 0–1 | 1–3 | 1–2 | 1–0 | 2–1 | 3–2 | |

Updated to match(es) played on 24 May 2015. Source:
Rules for classification: 1) points; 2) goal difference; 3) number of goals scored.
(P) Promoted

==== South Zone ====
| Pos | Team | Pld | W | D | L | GF | GA | GD | Pts | Promotion or qualification | MAF | CPI | OPE | BCB | CAL | NOG | 1DZ | LOU |
|---|---|---|---|---|---|---|---|---|---|---|---|---|---|---|---|---|---|---|
| 1 | Mafra (C, P) | 14 | 8 | 4 | 2 | 15 | 8 | +7 | 28 | Promotion to 2015–16 LigaPro | | 1–0 | 1–0 | 1–1 | 2–1 | 2–1 | 2–0 | 1–0 |
| 2 | Casa Pia | 14 | 8 | 3 | 3 | 17 | 8 | +9 | 27 | Third Place Playoff | 1–1 | | 2–1 | 0–0 | 2–0 | 2–0 | 2–0 | 2–1 |
| 3 | Operário | 14 | 7 | 3 | 4 | 18 | 11 | +7 | 24 | | 1–1 | 0–1 | | 4–1 | 2–0 | 2–0 | 1–0 | 2–1 |
| 4 | Benf. Castelo Branco | 14 | 6 | 4 | 4 | 14 | 14 | 0 | 22 | | 1–0 | 2–1 | 1–2 | | 1–1 | 2–2 | 0–1 | 1–0 |
| 5 | Caldas | 14 | 3 | 7 | 4 | 11 | 13 | −2 | 16 | | 2–1 | 1–1 | 0–0 | 0–1 | | 1–1 | 0–0 | 1–1 |
| 6 | Nogueirense | 14 | 4 | 3 | 7 | 16 | 16 | 0 | 15 | | 0–0 | 2–0 | 1–2 | 0–1 | 0–1 | | 0–2 | 2–1 |
| 7 | 1.º de Dezembro | 14 | 3 | 3 | 8 | 6 | 15 | −9 | 12 | | 0–1 | 0–1 | 0–0 | 2–1 | 0–2 | 0–2 | | 1–1 |
| 8 | Louletano | 14 | 2 | 3 | 9 | 10 | 23 | −13 | 9 | | 0–1 | 0–4 | 2–1 | 0–1 | 1–1 | 0–5 | 2–0 | |

Updated to match(es) played on 24 May 2015. Source:
Rules for classification: 1) points; 2) goal difference; 3) number of goals scored.
(C) Champions; (P) Promoted

=== Third place playoff ===
==== First leg ====
6 June 2015

| Varzim | 2–0 | Casa Pia |

Estádio do Varzim S.C., Póvoa de Varzim

==== Second leg ====
10 June 2015

| Casa Pia | 1–1 | Varzim |

Estádio Pina Manique, Lisbon

Varzim won 3-1 on aggregate and were promoted to LigaPro.

=== Grand final ===
10 June 2015

| Famalicão | 1–1 (a.e.t.) | Mafra |
Penalties
| | 3–4 |

Estádio Municipal, Marinha Grande

=== Relegations Group ===
==== Serie A ====
| Pos | Team | Pld | W | D | L | GF | GA | GD | Pts | Qualification or relegation | VIL | BRA | VIA | PED | LIM | CER | STM | VIE |
|---|---|---|---|---|---|---|---|---|---|---|---|---|---|---|---|---|---|---|
| 1 | Vilaverdense | 14 | 8 | 2 | 4 | 28 | 15 | +13 | 41 | | | 0–1 | 3–3 | 2–2 | 4–2 | 6–1 | 2–0 | 3–0 |
| 2 | Bragança | 14 | 7 | 3 | 4 | 19 | 18 | +1 | 37 | | 0–2 | | 1–0 | 1–2 | 3–2 | 3–1 | 1–3 | 1–0 |
| 3 | Vianense | 14 | 6 | 5 | 3 | 20 | 16 | +4 | 34 | | 1–0 | 1–3 | | 2–0 | 2–2 | 1–0 | 2–0 | 0–0 |
| 4 | Pedras Salgadas | 14 | 5 | 4 | 5 | 15 | 16 | −1 | 32 | | 2–0 | 0–0 | 0–0 | | 2–3 | 0–1 | 1–0 | 3–1 |
| 5 | Limianos | 14 | 5 | 5 | 4 | 22 | 20 | +2 | 27 | | 1–0 | 1–1 | 1–2 | 3–1 | | 2–0 | 2–1 | 0–1 |
| 6 | Cerveira (R) | 14 | 3 | 4 | 7 | 18 | 26 | −8 | 25 | Play-out | 1–2 | 3–0 | 3–2 | 0–1 | 1–1 | | 2–2 | 2–2 |
| 7 | Santa Maria (R) | 14 | 3 | 5 | 6 | 21 | 20 | +1 | 24 | Relegation to Distritais | 0–1 | 3–3 | 1–1 | 2–0 | 1–1 | 2–2 | | 5–0 |
| 8 | Vieira (R) | 14 | 3 | 4 | 7 | 13 | 25 | −12 | 18 | Relegation to Distritais | 1–3 | 0–1 | 2–3 | 1–1 | 1–1 | 2–1 | 2–1 | |

Updated to match(es) played on 24 May 2015. Source:
Rules for classification: 1) points; 2) goal difference; 3) number of goals scored.
(R) Relegated

==== Serie B ====
| Pos | Team | Pld | W | D | L | GF | GA | GD | Pts | Qualification or relegation | VIZ | FEL | ADO | AMA | VRE | TIR | STE | RIB |
|---|---|---|---|---|---|---|---|---|---|---|---|---|---|---|---|---|---|---|
| 1 | Vizela | 14 | 5 | 7 | 2 | 23 | 17 | +6 | 42 | | | 1–1 | 3–0 | 2–2 | 1–1 | 0–0 | 3–2 | 5–2 |
| 2 | Felgueiras 1932 | 14 | 4 | 7 | 3 | 18 | 17 | +1 | 36 | | 2–0 | | 0–0 | 4–2 | 2–2 | 1–1 | 0–0 | 1–0 |
| 3 | Oliveirense | 14 | 5 | 5 | 4 | 22 | 18 | +4 | 32 | | 2–1 | 1–1 | | 2–1 | 1–2 | 1–1 | 7–2 | 2–1 |
| 4 | Amarante | 14 | 6 | 3 | 5 | 24 | 24 | 0 | 31 | | 1–1 | 4–2 | 1–0 | | 2–1 | 4–1 | 2–1 | 2–1 |
| 5 | Vila Real | 14 | 6 | 3 | 5 | 24 | 17 | +7 | 26 | | 1–2 | 3–0 | 1–3 | 5–1 | | 0–0 | 3–0 | 2–1 |
| 6 | Tirsense | 14 | 3 | 7 | 4 | 14 | 18 | −4 | 25 | Play-out | 1–2 | 0–2 | 1–1 | 2–1 | 2–3 | | 1–1 | 2–1 |
| 7 | CCD Santa Eulália (R) | 14 | 3 | 6 | 5 | 15 | 23 | −8 | 22 | Relegation to Distritais | 1–1 | 1–1 | 1–1 | 2–1 | 1–0 | 1–1 | | 1–1 |
| 8 | Ribeirão (R) | 14 | 3 | 4 | 7 | 13 | 19 | −6 | 18 | Relegation to Distritais | 1–1 | 2–1 | 1–1 | 0–0 | 1–0 | 0–1 | 1–0 | |

Updated to match(es) played on 24 May 2015. Source:
Rules for classification: 1) points; 2) goal difference; 3) number of goals scored.
(R) Relegated

==== Serie C ====
| Pos | Team | Pld | W | D | L | GF | GA | GD | Pts | Qualification or relegation | GON | COI | CIN | SOB | LOU | PED | ESP | MOI |
|---|---|---|---|---|---|---|---|---|---|---|---|---|---|---|---|---|---|---|
| 1 | Gondomar | 14 | 7 | 6 | 1 | 15 | 11 | +4 | 41 | | | 0–0 | 1–1 | 2–0 | 2–0 | 2–1 | 1–0 | 2–1 |
| 2 | Coimbrões | 14 | 6 | 5 | 3 | 21 | 13 | +8 | 38 | | 1–1 | | 1–2 | 6–0 | 2–1 | 2–1 | 1–1 | 0–0 |
| 3 | Cinfães | 14 | 5 | 4 | 5 | 14 | 12 | +2 | 35 | | 0–1 | 0–1 | | 3–0 | 2–2 | 0–1 | 0–1 | 1–0 |
| 4 | Sobrado | 14 | 4 | 3 | 7 | 9 | 19 | −10 | 27 | | 0–0 | 1–2 | 0–1 | | 1–0 | 1–1 | 2–0 | 1–2 |
| 5 | Lusitânia Lourosa | 14 | 3 | 8 | 3 | 23 | 15 | +8 | 27 | | 5–0 | 2–2 | 1–1 | 0–0 | | 6–0 | 2–2 | 1–1 |
| 6 | Pedras Rubras | 14 | 5 | 4 | 5 | 14 | 16 | −2 | 27 | Play-out | 0–1 | 2–0 | 1–0 | 0–1 | 1–1 | | 0–0 | 2–0 |
| 7 | Sp. Espinho (R) | 14 | 4 | 4 | 6 | 10 | 14 | −4 | 23 | Relegation to Distritais | 1–1 | 2–0 | 1–2 | 1–0 | 0–1 | 0–2 | | 1–0 |
| 8 | Moimenta da Beira (R) | 14 | 2 | 6 | 6 | 11 | 17 | −6 | 20 | Relegation to Distritais | 1–1 | 0–2 | 1–1 | 1–2 | 1–1 | 2–2 | 1–0 | |

Updated to match(es) played on 24 May 2015. Source:
Rules for classification: 1) points; 2) goal difference; 3) number of goals scored.
(R) Relegated

==== Serie D ====
| Pos | Team | Pld | W | D | L | GF | GA | GD | Pts | Qualification or relegation | ANA | SAN | EST | GAF | CAM | GOU | MAR | SJV |
|---|---|---|---|---|---|---|---|---|---|---|---|---|---|---|---|---|---|---|
| 1 | Anadia | 14 | 9 | 2 | 3 | 21 | 12 | +9 | 40 | | | 2–3 | 2–1 | 1–0 | 3–2 | 2–0 | 2–1 | 1–0 |
| 2 | Sanjoanense | 14 | 8 | 3 | 3 | 23 | 16 | +7 | 39 | | 1–0 | | 2–1 | 0–0 | 3–2 | 2–3 | 2–0 | 1–1 |
| 3 | Estarreja | 14 | 5 | 2 | 7 | 14 | 15 | −1 | 32 | | 0–0 | 0–1 | | 2–1 | 2–1 | 0–1 | 3–1 | 0–1 |
| 4 | Gafanha | 14 | 5 | 6 | 3 | 18 | 13 | +5 | 30 | | 1–0 | 2–2 | 1–0 | | 0–0 | 5–0 | 0–0 | 1–1 |
| 5 | Camacha | 14 | 5 | 5 | 4 | 20 | 17 | +3 | 30 | | 1–1 | 2–1 | 2–1 | 1–1 | | 1–2 | 2–0 | 3–1 |
| 6 | Gouveia (R) | 14 | 5 | 2 | 7 | 16 | 28 | −12 | 27 | Play-out | 2–3 | 0–2 | 2–2 | 0–3 | 1–1 | | 0–2 | 3–2 |
| 7 | Marítimo C (R) | 14 | 4 | 2 | 8 | 14 | 18 | −4 | 26 | Relegation to Distritais | 0–3 | 1–2 | 0–1 | 4–0 | 0–0 | 1–2 | | 2–0 |
| 8 | S. João Vêr (R) | 14 | 3 | 2 | 9 | 14 | 21 | −7 | 19 | Relegation to Distritais | 0–1 | 2–1 | 0–1 | 2–3 | 1–2 | 2–0 | 1–2 | |

Updated to match(es) played on 24 May 2015. Source:
Rules for classification: 1) points; 2) goal difference; 3) number of goals scored.
(R) Relegated

==== Serie E ====
| Pos | Team | Pld | W | D | L | GF | GA | GD | Pts | Qualification or relegation | HOS | PAM | MOR | TOU | SER | NAV | POM | SOU |
|---|---|---|---|---|---|---|---|---|---|---|---|---|---|---|---|---|---|---|
| 1 | Oliv. Hospital | 14 | 6 | 5 | 3 | 21 | 17 | +4 | 35 | | | 4–2 | 0–3 | 1–1 | 0–0 | 3–1 | 1–0 | 1–1 |
| 2 | Pampilhosa | 14 | 4 | 6 | 4 | 24 | 21 | +3 | 32 | | 2–2 | | 1–1 | 2–2 | 1–1 | 2–1 | 2–0 | 1–0 |
| 3 | Mortágua | 14 | 7 | 4 | 3 | 17 | 13 | +4 | 31 | | 1–1 | 1–0 | | 2–1 | 1–0 | 0–0 | 2–0 | 0–0 |
| 4 | Tourizense | 14 | 5 | 6 | 3 | 15 | 14 | +1 | 30 | | 3–1 | 1–0 | 1–0 | | 1–0 | 2–0 | 1–1 | 0–0 |
| 5 | Vit. Sernache | 14 | 4 | 4 | 6 | 21 | 22 | −1 | 30 | | 1–2 | 1–5 | 4–1 | 1–1 | | 1–3 | 6–0 | 2–1 |
| 7 | Naval | 14 | 5 | 1 | 8 | 15 | 19 | −4 | 28 | Play-out | 1–2 | 1–0 | 0–2 | 2–1 | 0–1 | | 4–1 | 1–0 |
| 6 | Sp. Pombal (R) | 14 | 5 | 3 | 6 | 21 | 26 | −5 | 28 | Relegation to Distritais | 0–3 | 2–2 | 4–1 | 4–0 | 4–1 | 2–1 | | 3–2 |
| 8 | Sourense (R) | 14 | 2 | 7 | 5 | 14 | 16 | −2 | 27 | Relegation to Distritais | 1–0 | 4–4 | 1–2 | 0–0 | 2–2 | 2–0 | 0–0 | |

Updated to match(es) played on 24 May 2015. Source:
Rules for classification: 1) points; 2) goal difference; 3) number of goals scored.
(R) Relegated

==== Serie F ====
| Pos | Team | Pld | W | D | L | GF | GA | GD | Pts | Qualification or relegation | LEI | SER | ALC | TOR | ELE | FAT | OUR | RIA |
|---|---|---|---|---|---|---|---|---|---|---|---|---|---|---|---|---|---|---|
| 1 | União de Leiria | 12 | 6 | 4 | 2 | 26 | 15 | +11 | 39 | | | 0–1 | 2–0 | 0–0 | 3–2 | 4–1 | 5–1 | |
| 2 | Sertanense | 12 | 6 | 4 | 2 | 22 | 11 | +11 | 38 | | 2–2 | | 0–1 | 2–0 | 1–1 | 2–1 | 4–0 | |
| 3 | Alcanenense | 12 | 6 | 2 | 4 | 20 | 22 | −2 | 32 | | 3–3 | 2–1 | | 2–1 | 1–0 | 2–2 | 3–1 | |
| 4 | Torreense | 12 | 2 | 7 | 3 | 12 | 12 | 0 | 27 | | 1–1 | 0–0 | 0–1 | | 2–0 | 1–1 | 2–2 | |
| 5 | Eléctrico | 12 | 3 | 2 | 7 | 14 | 18 | −4 | 26 | | 1–2 | 2–3 | 3–2 | 1–1 | | 2–0 | 0–1 | |
| 6 | Fátima (R) | 12 | 4 | 4 | 4 | 21 | 15 | +6 | 25 | Play-out | 2–1 | 0–0 | 4–0 | 1–1 | 1–2 | | 6–0 | |
| 7 | At. Ouriense (R) | 12 | 3 | 1 | 8 | 15 | 37 | −22 | 13 | Relegation to Distritais | 1–3 | 2–6 | 5–3 | 0–3 | 1–0 | 0–2 | | |
| 8 | At. Riachense (D) | 0 | 0 | 0 | 0 | 0 | 0 | 0 | 0 | Relegation to Distritais | | | | | | | | |

Updated to match(es) played on 24 May 2015. Source:
Rules for classification: 1) points; 2) goal difference; 3) number of goals scored.
(D) Disqualified; (R) Relegated

==== Serie G ====
| Pos | Team | Pld | W | D | L | GF | GA | GD | Pts | Qualification or relegation | SAC | LOU | COV | PIN | SIN | MAL | MOM | FAB |
|---|---|---|---|---|---|---|---|---|---|---|---|---|---|---|---|---|---|---|
| 1 | Sacavenense | 14 | 8 | 2 | 4 | 20 | 14 | +6 | 38 | | | 1–0 | 3–1 | 2–1 | 2–0 | 1–3 | 2–1 | 1–0 |
| 2 | Loures | 14 | 7 | 4 | 3 | 21 | 14 | +7 | 37 | | 1–1 | | 0–2 | 3–3 | 2–2 | 4–1 | 1–0 | 3–1 |
| 3 | Cova da Piedade | 14 | 6 | 3 | 5 | 21 | 19 | +2 | 35 | | 4–1 | 1–1 | | 1–1 | 2–0 | 1–0 | 1–2 | 1–1 |
| 4 | Pinhalnovense | 14 | 6 | 3 | 5 | 27 | 24 | +3 | 32 | | 0–1 | 0–1 | 4–0 | | 3–1 | 2–0 | 1–1 | 2–1 |
| 5 | Sintrense | 14 | 6 | 3 | 5 | 16 | 15 | +1 | 32 | | 1–0 | 0–1 | 1–0 | 4–3 | | 0–1 | 2–1 | 2–0 |
| 6 | At. Malveira | 14 | 5 | 2 | 7 | 17 | 22 | −5 | 29 | Play-out | 0–0 | 0–2 | 1–0 | 7–3 | 0–3 | | 1–1 | 0–2 |
| 7 | U. Montemor (R) | 14 | 3 | 4 | 7 | 18 | 24 | −6 | 26 | Relegation to Distritais | 0–3 | 0–1 | 3–4 | 1–2 | 0–0 | 3–2 | | 2–2 |
| 8 | Fabril Barreiro (R) | 14 | 3 | 3 | 8 | 14 | 22 | −8 | 19 | Relegation to Distritais | 2–1 | 2–1 | 1–3 | 0–2 | 0–0 | 0–1 | 2–3 | |

Updated to match(es) played on 24 May 2015. Source:
Rules for classification: 1) points; 2) goal difference; 3) number of goals scored.
(R) Relegated

==== Serie H ====
| Pos | Team | Pld | W | D | L | GF | GA | GD | Pts | Qualification or relegation | ANG | MOU | LUS | PRA | REG | ALJ | QUA | FER |
|---|---|---|---|---|---|---|---|---|---|---|---|---|---|---|---|---|---|---|
| 1 | Angrense | 14 | 6 | 5 | 3 | 19 | 18 | +1 | 41 | | | 2–1 | 1–1 | 2–2 | 3–2 | 1–1 | 0–0 | 2–1 |
| 2 | Moura | 14 | 7 | 5 | 2 | 19 | 8 | +11 | 37 | | 0–0 | | 1–0 | 2–2 | 1–1 | 4–0 | 2–1 | 1–0 |
| 3 | Lusitano VRSA | 14 | 4 | 5 | 5 | 20 | 18 | +2 | 31 | | 3–1 | 1–0 | | 0–1 | 0–0 | 6–0 | 2–2 | 1–1 |
| 4 | Praiense | 14 | 4 | 5 | 5 | 20 | 23 | −3 | 30 | | 3–1 | 0–2 | 3–0 | | 1–1 | 1–1 | 2–1 | 2–2 |
| 5 | Atl. Reguengos | 14 | 4 | 9 | 1 | 17 | 12 | +5 | 27 | | 1–0 | 0–0 | 2–1 | 3–1 | | 1–1 | 0–0 | 2–2 |
| 6 | Aljustrelense (R) | 14 | 3 | 5 | 6 | 17 | 31 | −14 | 23 | Play-out | 1–2 | 1–3 | 3–3 | 2–1 | 0–2 | | 2–1 | 3–2 |
| 7 | Quarteirense (R) | 14 | 3 | 6 | 5 | 19 | 15 | +4 | 22 | Relegation to Distritais | 1–2 | 0–0 | 0–1 | 4–1 | 1–1 | 3–1 | | 5–1 |
| 8 | Ferreiras (R) | 14 | 2 | 6 | 6 | 17 | 23 | −6 | 22 | Relegation to Distritais | 1–2 | 0–2 | 3–1 | 2–0 | 1–1 | 1–1 | 0–0 | |

Updated to match(es) played on 24 May 2015. Source:
Rules for classification: 1) points; 2) goal difference; 3) number of goals scored.
(R) Relegated

==== 6th places playouts ====
| Team 1 | Agg. | Team 2 | 1st leg | 2nd leg |
|---|---|---|---|---|
| Gouveia (D) | 1–5 | (B) Tirsense | 1–2 | 0–3 |
| Cerveira (A) | 0–1 | (C) Pedras Rubras | 0–1 | 0–0 |
| Fátima (F) | 3–4 | (E) Naval 1º de Maio | 2–2 | 1–2 |
| Aljustrelense (H) | 3–3 | (G) Malveira | 1–2 | 2–1 |

== See also ==
- 2014–15 Primeira Liga
- 2014–15 Segunda Liga
- 2014–15 Taça de Portugal
- 2014–15 Taça da Liga
