= 2020–21 Campeonato de Portugal (First Stage) =

The 2020–21 Campeonato de Portugal is the eighth season of Portuguese football's renovated third-tier league, since the merging of the Segunda Divisão and Terceira Divisão in 2013, and the sixth season under the current Campeonato de Portugal title. A total of 96 teams compete in this division.

Due to the cancellation of all non-professional competitions in the country due to the COVID-19 pandemic in Portugal in the previous season, no teams were relegated, which lead to an additional team from each of the 20 district championships. The Portuguese Football Federation decided on the creation of Liga 3, a new tier in the Portuguese league system beginning with the 2021–22 season, as well as a new format for the Campeonato de Portugal, including the addition of four reserve teams invited from Primeira Liga clubs, raising the total number of teams from 72 to 96. This new format will reduce the total number of teams to 56 in the next season.

== Format ==
The new competition format consists of three stages. In the first stage, the 96 clubs were divided in eight series of 12 teams, according to geographic criteria, with a maximum of two reserve teams in each series. In each series, teams play against each other in a home-and-away double round-robin system.

== First stage ==
The first stage schedule was drawn on 4 September 2020 and are played from 20 September 2020 to 3 April 2021.

=== Serie A ===
Pos	Team	Pld	W	D	L	GF	GA	GD	Pts	Qualification or relegation
1	Braga B (T)	17	14	3	0	53	9	+44	45	Advance to Promotion Series
2	Merelinense (X)	18	12	2	4	28	10	+18	38	Advance to Liga 3 qualification series Group A
3	Mirandela (Z)	18	8	7	3	21	13	+8	31	Advance to Liga 3 qualification series Group A
4	Montalegre (Z)	18	7	7	4	28	20	+8	28	Advance to Liga 3 qualification series Group B
5	Maria da Fonte (Z)	16	7	4	5	21	20	+1	25	Advance to Liga 3 qualification series Group B
6	Vianense (Z)	17	6	5	6	20	22	−2	23	
7	Vilaverdense (Z)	18	5	6	7	22	27	−5	21	
8	Vidago (Z)	18	5	5	8	25	30	−5	20	
9	Pedras Salgadas (Z)	18	4	7	7	13	19	−6	19	Relegation to District Championship
10	Bragança (Z)	18	3	7	8	10	18	−8	16	Relegation to District Championship
11	Cerveira (W)	18	3	4	11	8	22	−14	13	Relegation to District Championship
12	Águia Vimioso (R)	18	1	5	12	11	50	−39	8	Relegation to District Championship

Updated to match(es) played on 31 January 2021. Source: FPF.pt
Rules for classification: 1) Points, 2) Head-to-head points, 3) Head-to-head goal difference, 4) Goal difference, 5) Matches won, 6) Goals scored
(R) Relegated; (T) Qualified, but not yet for the particular phase indicated; (W) Can only remain in Campeonato de Portugal; (X) Will not be relegated; (Z) Can only reach the Liga 3 qualification Series

==== Results ====
Home \ Away	BRB	MER	MIR	MON	MdF	VIA	VIL	VID	PSA	BRA	CER	ÁGV
Braga B	—	3–1	3–0	2–1	5–1	6–1	7–0	3–1	1–1	3–0		
Merelinense		—		1–0	1–0	2–0	1–0	2–0	1–0		2–0	6–1
Mirandela		0–1	—	2–1	2–1	0–0	1–1	4–1		0–1	2–0	1–1
Montalegre		1–0	0–2	—		3–1	2–2	3–2	2–1	0–0	1–1	6–0
Maria da Fonte		1–0	2–2	2–2	—	1–0		2–2	1–0	3–2	1–0	
Vianense	0–4	1–3	0–0			—	0–0	3–1	2–1		1–0	6–0
Vilaverdense	1–4		0–1	2–2	0–1	0–2	—	4–0	2–2		2–1	5–1
Vidago	0–1	2–1			1–1	1–3	0–0	—	2–0	1–1	4–1	2–1
Pedras Salgadas	0–4		0–0	0–0	1–0	0–0	1–0		—	1–2		1–0
Bragança	0–1	0–3	0–1	0–1		0–0	1–2	0–0	1–1	—	2–0	0–0
Cerveira	1–1	0–0	0–0	0–1	1–0		0–1		0–2	1–0	—	0–2
Águia Vimioso	0–4	0–2	1–3	2–2	1–4			0–5	1–1	0–0	0–2	—

Updated to match(es) played on unknown. Source:
Legend: Blue = home team win; Yellow = draw; Red = away team win.

=== Serie B ===
Pos	Team	Pld	W	D	L	GF	GA	GD	Pts	Qualification or relegation
1	Pevidém (X)	16	8	6	2	23	13	+10	30	Advance to Promotion Series
2	Fafe (X)	15	8	3	4	21	15	+6	27	Advance to Liga 3 qualification Series
3	Berço	14	6	5	3	22	15	+7	23	Advance to Liga 3 qualification Series
4	São Martinho (S)	16	6	5	5	17	17	0	23	Advance to Liga 3 qualification Series
5	Vitória SC B	14	5	7	2	20	11	+9	22	Advance to Liga 3 qualification Series
6	Felgueiras	14	5	7	2	15	11	+4	22	
7	Rio Ave B	14	5	4	5	16	15	+1	19	
8	Tirsense (Z)	16	5	3	8	18	25	−7	18	
9	Brito (Z)	14	3	5	6	14	20	−6	14	Relegation to District Championship
10	Mondinense (R)	15	0	1	14	8	32	−24	1	Relegation to District Championship
11	Camacha	0	0	0	0	0	0	0	0	Withdrew
12	Desportivo das Aves	0	0	0	0	0	0	0	0	Withdrew

Updated to match(es) played on 31 January 2021. Source: FPF.pt
Rules for classification: 1) Points, 2) Head-to-head points, 3) Head-to-head goal difference, 4) Goal difference, 5) Matches won, 6) Goals scored
(R) Relegated; (S) Will not reach the Promotion Series and not regulated; (X) Will not be relegated; (Z) Can only reach the Liga 3 qualification Series

==== Results ====
Home \ Away	PEV	FAF	BER	SMA	VTB	FEL	RAB	TIR	BRI	MON	CAM	AVE
Pevidém	—	1–0	0–3		2–1			5–0	4–2	1–0		
Fafe	2–1	—	0–1	2–1	1–1				1–0		3–0	
Berço			—	3–2		2–3	0–2	1–1				3–0
São Martinho	1–1	1–1	1–0	—		2–1	1–3	2–1				
Vitória SC B			2–2	0–0	—	1–1		2–1	1–1	5–0		
Felgueiras	0–0	2–1			1–0	—	0–0		1–2	1–0		
Rio Ave B	1–1	0–2			1–2		—		3–2		1–0	
Tirsense	1–3	1–3		1–0		1–1	1–2	—		2–0		
Brito			1–1	1–2	0–2	1–1	0–0	1–3	—	1–0		
Mondinense	1–2	1–2	1–3	0–1		0–2	0–2	1–2		—		
Camacha			0–3		0–3						—	
Desportivo das Aves												—

Updated to match(es) played on unknown. Source:
Legend: Blue = home team win; Yellow = draw; Red = away team win.

=== Serie C ===
Pos	Team	Pld	W	D	L	GF	GA	GD	Pts	Qualification or relegation
1	Gondomar (T)	15	9	4	2	23	9	+14	31	Advance to Promotion Series
2	Leça (X)	14	9	3	2	21	9	+12	30	Advance to Liga 3 qualification series Group C
3	Trofense (X)	14	8	5	1	14	3	+11	29	Advance to Liga 3 qualification series Group C
4	Amarante (Y)	15	6	3	6	13	14	−1	21	Advance to Liga 3 qualification series Group D
5	Marítimo B	12	5	2	5	18	13	+5	17	Advance to Liga 3 qualification series Group D
6	Pedras Rubras (Y)	14	5	2	7	11	20	−9	17	
7	Paredes (Z)	14	3	5	6	7	13	−6	14	
8	Salgueiros (Z)	14	3	4	7	10	15	−5	13	
9	Vila Real (Z)	14	3	3	8	10	21	−11	12	Relegation to District Championship
10	Coimbrões (Z)	14	2	3	9	10	20	−10	9	Relegation to District Championship
11	União da Madeira (R)	0	0	0	0	0	0	0	0	Withdrew
12	Câmara de Lobos (R)	0	0	0	0	0	0	0	0	Withdrew

Updated to match(es) played on 31 January 2021. Source: FPF.pt
Rules for classification: 1) Points, 2) Head-to-head points, 3) Head-to-head goal difference, 4) Goal difference, 5) Matches won, 6) Goals scored
(R) Relegated; (T) Qualified, but not yet for the particular phase indicated; (X) Will not be relegated; (Y) Can only reach the Liga 3 qualification Series; (Z) Can only reach the Liga 3 qualification series Group D

==== Results ====
Home \ Away

Updated to match(es) played on unknown. Source:
Legend: Blue = home team win; Yellow = draw; Red = away team win.

=== Serie D ===
Pos	Team	Pld	W	D	L	GF	GA	GD	Pts	Qualification or relegation
1	Anadia (T)	17	11	5	1	26	9	+17	38	Advance to Promotion Series
2	Canelas 2010 (X)	18	11	2	5	25	13	+12	35	Advance to Liga 3 qualification series Group D
3	Lusitânia Lourosa	18	9	6	3	33	19	+14	33	Advance to Liga 3 qualification series Group D
4	São João de Ver	18	8	7	3	27	11	+16	31	Advance to Liga 3 qualification series Group C
5	Sanjoanense	18	6	11	1	23	12	+11	29	Advance to Liga 3 qualification series Group C
6	Beira-Mar (Y)	18	7	4	7	25	15	+10	25	
7	Valadares (Y)	18	7	3	8	24	25	−1	24	
8	Castro Daire	16	6	4	6	14	19	−5	22	
9	Espinho (Z)	18	6	3	9	24	21	+3	21	Relegation to District Championship
10	Águeda (Z)	17	4	4	9	17	22	−5	16	Relegation to District Championship
11	Lusitano Vildemoinhos (W)	18	3	4	11	11	25	−14	13	Relegation to District Championship
12	Vila Cortez (R)	18	1	1	16	6	64	−58	4	Relegation to District Championship

Updated to match(es) played on 31 January 2021. Source: FPF.pt
Rules for classification: 1) Points, 2) Head-to-head points, 3) Head-to-head goal difference, 4) Goal difference, 5) Matches won, 6) Goals scored
(R) Relegated; (T) Qualified, but not yet for the particular phase indicated; (W) Can only remain in Campeonato de Portugal; (X) Will not be relegated; (Y) Can only reach the Liga 3 qualification Series; (Z) Can only reach the Liga 3 qualification Series

==== Results ====
Home \ Away	ANA	CAN	LUS	SJV	SJO	BMR	VAL	ESP	CDR	ÁGU	LSV	VCO
Anadia	—	3–0	1–1	1–0	0–2		2–1	1–0	1–2	0–0	1–0	7–0
Canelas 2010	0–1	—	2–0	2–1		2–0	1–2	1–0	4–0	2–1	1–0	1–0
Lusitânia Lourosa	1–1	0–0	—	1–2	1–1	2–1	5–2		2–0	3–2	2–1	5–1
São João de Ver	2–0	0–0		—	1–1	0–0	0–0	2–0	1–1	1–0	0–0	7–0
Sanjoanense	1–1	2–0	2–1	0–0	—	0–0	0–1	1–1	0–0		3–0	5–0
Beira-Mar		0–2	1–2	3–1	2–0	—		1–1	2–0	1–1	2–1	3–0
Valadares	1–2	1–1	0–1	1–1	0–1	2–1	—	2–1	1–0	2–0	2–1	
Espinho	0–1	0–3	2–3	3–0	3–3	1–0	1–0	—	0–0	1–0		4–0
Castro Daire	0–1	2–1	0–3	0–3	1–1	2–1	2–0	0–1	—	1–0	2–0	2–2
Águeda	1–3	0–0	1–1		1–1	0–2	5–2	1–0		—	1–0	1–0
Lusitano Vildemoinhos	1–1	0–2	0–0	1–2	0–0	0–4	0–2	2–0		2–1	—	4–2
Vila Cortez	0–6		0–4	0–3	0–1	0–4	0–5	0–8	0–1	2–1	1–3	—

Updated to match(es) played on unknown. Source:
Legend: Blue = home team win; Yellow = draw; Red = away team win.

=== Serie E ===
Pos	Team	Pld	W	D	L	GF	GA	GD	Pts	Qualification or relegation
1	União de Leiria (T)	17	12	4	1	28	8	+20	40	Advance to Promotion Series
2	Benfica Castelo Branco (W)	16	8	6	2	20	11	+9	30	Advance to Liga 3 qualification series Group E
3	Oliveira do Hospital (Z)	16	7	5	4	17	14	+3	26	Advance to Liga 3 qualification series Group E
4	Oleiros (Z)	16	5	7	4	26	22	+4	22	Advance to Liga 3 qualification series Group F
5	Marinhense (Z)	16	6	4	6	19	17	+2	22	Advance to Liga 3 qualification series Group F
6	Sertanense (Z)	14	3	7	4	19	18	+1	16	
7	Vitória de Sernache (Z)	14	3	5	6	18	21	−3	14	
8	Condeixa (Z)	14	2	7	5	11	16	−5	13	
9	Carapinheirense (Z)	15	3	5	7	15	21	−6	14	Relegation to District Championship
10	Mortágua (Z)	15	1	9	5	15	20	−5	12	Relegation to District Championship
11	Alcains (Z)	17	2	7	8	11	31	−20	13	Relegation to District Championship
12	GRAP	0	0	0	0	0	0	0	0	Withdrew

Updated to match(es) played on 31 January 2021. Source: FPF.pt
Rules for classification: 1) Points, 2) Head-to-head points, 3) Head-to-head goal difference, 4) Goal difference, 5) Matches won, 6) Goals scored
(T) Assured a place of the Liga 3 qualification Series; (W) Will not be regulated; (Z) Can only reach the Liga 3 qualification Series

==== Results ====
Home \ Away	UDL	BCB	OdH	OLE	MAR	SER	CON	VdS	CAR	MOR	ALC	GRAP
União de Leiria	—	1–0	0–0	1–1	1–1	1–0	1–0	1–0	3–1		3–1	
Benfica Castelo Branco	1–0	—	1–0		1–0	4–3		3–1		0–0	1–1	3–0
Oliveira do Hospital		1–3	—		2–0	1–3	1–1	1–0	2–0	2–1	3–0	1–0
Oleiros	0–4		0–0	—	2–2	2–1		3–1	3–1	2–2	5–0	
Marinhense	1–1	1–0		0–1	—			1–0	2–1	2–1	5–1	3–0
Sertanense		1–1	1–1	1–1	2–1	—			1–1	1–1	0–0	2–0
Condeixa	1–4	0–0	0–1	1–0	2–1		—	1–1		1–2	2–2	
Vitória de Sernache	0–1		3–0	4–4		0–0		—	1–1		1–0	
Carapinheirense	0–1	0–2	0–1		1–0	2–2	1–1		—	2–2	2–0	
Mortágua	0–1	1–1	1–0	1–1			0–0	3–3	0–2	—		
Alcains	1–4	0–0		1–0	1–1	0–2	1–1	1–1		1–0	—	0–0
GRAP	1–2				0–4		1–3	1–7	2–2	0–5		—

Updated to match(es) played on unknown. Source:
Legend: Blue = home team win; Yellow = draw; Red = away team win.

=== Serie F ===
Pos	Team	Pld	W	D	L	GF	GA	GD	Pts	Qualification or relegation
1	Alverca (T)	16	13	0	3	33	7	+26	39	Advance to Promotion Series
2	Torreense (T)	15	12	2	1	27	8	+19	38	Advance to Liga 3 qualification series Group F
3	União de Santarém (Y)	18	9	5	4	28	19	+9	32	Advance to Liga 3 qualification series Group F
4	Loures (Y)	17	7	5	5	18	16	+2	26	Advance to Liga 3 qualification series Group E
5	Caldas (Y)	16	7	2	7	20	20	0	23	Advance to Liga 3 qualification series Group E
6	Pêro Pinheiro (Z)	18	5	6	7	10	15	−5	21	
7	Sintrense (Y)	16	7	0	9	20	26	−6	21	
8	Sacavenense (Z)	17	4	6	7	15	19	−4	18	
9	União de Almeirim (Z)	16	4	2	10	13	22	−9	14	Relegation to District Championship
10	1.º de Dezembro (W)	17	2	6	9	13	26	−13	12	Relegation to District Championship
11	Lourinhanense (W)	16	1	6	9	11	30	−19	9	Relegation to District Championship
12	Fátima	0	0	0	0	0	0	0	0	Withdrew

Updated to match(es) played on 31 January 2021. Source: FPF.pt
Rules for classification: 1) Points, 2) Head-to-head points, 3) Head-to-head goal difference, 4) Goal difference, 5) Matches won, 6) Goals scored
(T) Assured a place of the Liga 3 qualification Series; (W) ?; (Y) Can only reach the Liga 3 qualification Series; (Z) Can only reach the Liga 3 qualification series Group E

==== Results ====
Home \ Away	TOR	ALV	UdS	CAL	LRS	SAC	PPI	STR	UdA	DEZ	LRH	FÁT
Torreense	—		3–0		1–1	2–0	1–0	2–0	2–1			
Alverca		—	3–0	0–1	1–0		2–0	3–0		5–1	1–0	
União de Santarém	0–2	3–2	—	1–1	1–1		1–0	4–1	2–0	2–0	2–2	
Caldas	1–3		1–2	—		1–3			1–1	2–1	4–0	3–0
Loures			1–1	3–1	—	1–1		1–0	1–0	2–0	0–2	3–0
Sacavenense	0–2	1–0	0–2	0–1	1–1	—	3–0	4–0	0–0			1–1
Pêro Pinheiro		0–1	1–1	2–0	0–0	0–0	—	1–0	1–0	2–2	1–1	
Sintrense	1–1	1–4		0–1	2–1	3–0		—		2–1	5–1	
União de Almeirim	1–2			1–3	0–1		1–0	2–1	—	3–2	3–0	
1.º de Dezembro	0–0	0–1	0–2	2–1		1–0	0–0			—	1–1	
Lourinhanense	0–2			0–1	1–2	1–1	0–1			1–1	—	
Fátima	0–4	0–6							3–0			—

Updated to match(es) played on unknown. Source:
Legend: Blue = home team win; Yellow = draw; Red = away team win.

=== Serie G ===
Pos	Team	Pld	W	D	L	GF	GA	GD	Pts	Qualification or relegation
1	Estrela da Amadora (T)	17	12	4	1	26	9	+17	40	Advance to Promotion Series
2	Sporting CP B (X)	16	11	5	0	24	5	+19	38	Advance to Liga 3 qualification series Group G
3	Oriental Dragon	16	8	4	4	21	10	+11	28	Advance to Liga 3 qualification series Group G
4	Real SC (Z)	18	7	4	7	24	19	+5	25	Advance to Liga 3 qualification series Group H
5	Rabo de Peixe (Z)	17	6	6	5	13	14	−1	24	Advance to Liga 3 qualification series Group H
6	Fontinhas (Z)	17	6	5	6	22	21	+1	23	
7	Praiense (Z)	18	5	8	5	16	19	−3	23	
8	Sp. Ideal (Z)	16	3	7	6	17	24	−7	16	
9	Belenenses SAD B (Z)	17	3	6	8	11	20	−9	15	Relegation to District Championship
10	Olímpico Montijo (Z)	14	4	3	7	15	25	−10	15	Relegation to District Championship
11	Fabril Barreiro (Z)	16	2	6	8	9	20	−11	12	Relegation to District Championship
12	Oriental (W)	18	1	6	11	12	24	−12	9	Relegation to District Championship

Updated to match(es) played on 31 January 2021. Source: FPF.pt
Rules for classification: 1) Points, 2) Head-to-head points, 3) Head-to-head goal difference, 4) Goal difference, 5) Matches won, 6) Goals scored
(T) Assured a place of the Liga 3 qualification Series; (W) Can only remain in Campeonato de Portugal; (X) Will not be relegated; (Z) Can only reach the Liga 3 qualification Series

==== Results ====
Home \ Away	AMA	SCB	DRA	PRA	PEI	FON	RSC	IDE	BSB	OLM	FAB	ORI
Estrela da Amadora	—	1–0	2–0	2–1		2–1	2–1	3–0	1–0	3–0	1–0	2–0
Sporting CP B	0–0	—		2–0	4–0	2–1	2–1		4–1	1–1	3–0	3–2
Oriental Dragon	2–1	0–0	—		1–0	0–1	4–3	4–1	0–1		1–1	0–0
Praiense	1–1	0–0	2–0	—	2–1	2–1	1–0	0–0		2–2	0–0	3–0
Rabo de Peixe	0–0	0–0	0–4	0–0	—		2–1	2–1	0–0	0–1	1–2	0–0
Fontinhas	1–2	0–3		2–1	4–0	—	1–1	2–2	1–3	2–1	4–1	2–1
Real SC	1–1		0–1	3–1	0–1	0–0	—	3–1	2–1	4–1	2–1	1–0
Sp. Ideal		0–1		1–1	0–2	1–1	2–1	—	1–1	4–0		2–1
Belenenses SAD B	0–1	0–0	0–2	1–1	1–3	0–2		4–1	—	1–0	1–0	
Olímpico Montijo	1–3	0–1	0–3	4–0	0–3	1–0		2–2	1–0	—		0–3
Fabril Barreiro		0–2	0–2	0–1	0–0		0–2	1–0	1–1	2–2	—	2–2
Oriental	1–2	0–1		0–2	0–1	1–1	1–1	0–3	0–0		0–1	—

Updated to match(es) played on unknown. Source:
Legend: Blue = home team win; Yellow = draw; Red = away team win.

=== Serie H ===
Pos	Team	Pld	W	D	L	GF	GA	GD	Pts	Qualification or relegation
1	Vitória de Setúbal (T)	17	14	3	0	45	18	+27	45	Advance to Promotion Series
2	Amora (X)	14	10	3	1	24	9	+15	33	Advance to Liga 3 qualification series Group H
3	Olhanense (Z)	16	8	4	4	20	13	+7	28	Advance to Liga 3 qualification series Group H
4	Louletano (Z)	14	6	6	2	21	11	+10	24	Advance to Liga 3 qualification series Group G
5	Moncarapachense (Z)	17	5	5	7	21	21	0	20	Advance to Liga 3 qualification series Group G
6	Esperança de Lagos (Z)	16	5	4	7	20	20	0	19	
7	Pinhalnovense (Z)	14	5	3	6	16	22	−6	18	
8	Lusitano de Évora (Z)	15	5	2	8	13	17	−4	17	
9	Juventude de Évora (Z)	16	4	4	8	20	31	−11	16	Relegation to District Championship
10	Aljustrelense (Z)	16	3	2	11	9	31	−22	11	Relegation to District Championship
11	Moura (W)	15	0	4	11	11	27	−16	4	Relegation to District Championship
12	Armacenenses	0	0	0	0	0	0	0	0	Withdrew

Updated to match(es) played on 1 February 2021. Source: FPF.pt
Rules for classification: 1) Points, 2) Head-to-head points, 3) Head-to-head goal difference, 4) Goal difference, 5) Matches won, 6) Goals scored
(T) Qualified, but not yet for the particular phase indicated; (W) Can only remain in Campeonato de Portugal; (X) Assured a place of the Liga 3 qualification Series; (Z) Can only reach the Liga 3 qualification Series

==== Results ====
Home \ Away	VIT	AMO	OLH	LOU	MON	PIN	LAG	LUS	JUV	ALJ	MOU	ARM
Vitória de Setúbal	—		2–2	2–2	1–0	2–1	1–1	5–2	4–0		2–1	
Amora	1–2	—	2–1	0–0	2–0			1–0			1–0	
Olhanense	2–3	0–2	—	2–1	1–0	1–0			2–0	2–0		
Louletano		1–1	0–0	—	1–1	5–0	2–2	1–0		2–0	1–0	
Moncarapachense	0–1		1–0	1–3	—	2–2	1–2		1–1	4–1	0–0	
Pinhalnovense	1–4	1–1				—	1–0	1–0	1–1	3–1	2–1	
Esperança de Lagos	0–1	2–3	0–1	1–2	3–3		—	1–0	0–1	3–0	1–1	
Lusitano de Évora	1–2	0–2	0–0	1–0	1–2	2–1		—		0–0	2–1	
Juventude de Évora	2–5	1–4	1–3		0–2	1–0	2–3	0–1	—	3–1	4–1	
Aljustrelense	1–5	0–1	0–2		1–0	1–2	1–0	0–3	1–1	—		
Moura	1–3	1–3			1–3		0–1		2–2	0–1	—	
Armacenenses												—

Updated to match(es) played on unknown. Source:
Legend: Blue = home team win; Yellow = draw; Red = away team win.
