= Victor Nikiema =

Burkinabé footballer (born 1993)

Personal information
- Date of birth: 23 September 1993 (age 33)
- Place of birth: Abidjan, Ivory Coast
- Height: 1.75 m (5 ft 9 in)
- Position: Midfielder

Team information
- Current team: Sobrado
- Number: 60

Youth career
- 2011–2012: Braga

Senior career*
Years	Team	Apps	(Gls)
2012–2014	Braga B	53	(1)
2014	→ Piast Gliwice (loan)	11	(0)
2015	Poli Timișoara	0	(0)
2015–2016	Pedras Salgadas	1	(0)
2016	Vitória de Sernache	6	(0)
2017	Limianos	10	(0)
2017	Freamunde	9	(0)
2018	Marinhense	14	(0)
2018–2019	Pedras Rubras	26	(0)
2019–2020	Coimbrões	15	(0)
2020–2021	Ideal		
2021–2022	Sobrado		
2022–2023	UD Valonguense		
2023–	Sobrado		
- * Club domestic league appearances and goals as of 16:00, 27 September 2024 (UTC)

Victor Nikiema (born 23 September 1993) is a Burkinabé footballer who plays as a midfielder for Sobrado. He also holds Ivorian citizenship.

== Club career ==
Nikiema made his professional debut in the Segunda Liga for Braga B on 19 August 2012 in a game against Naval.

On 5 August 2019, SC Coimbrões confirmed that they had signed Nikiema.

== International career ==
Nikiema represented Burkina-Faso at the 2009 FIFA U-17 World Cup and scored one goal in the group stage.

== Personal ==
He is the younger brother of Abdoul-Aziz Nikiema.
