= Pancras Otoo Papi =

Ghanaian footballer

Personal information
- Full name: Pancras Otoo Papi
- Date of birth: 12 May 1999 (age 27)
- Place of birth: Accra, Ghana
- Height: 1.72 m (5 ft 8 in)
- Position: Forward

Youth career
- Feyenoord Academy
- –2017: One World Football Academy
- 2017–2018: Alfenense

Senior career*
Years	Team	Apps	(Gls)
2017	WAFA	4	(0)
2018–2019	Oriental Dragon	16	(2)
2019–2020	Sobrado	15	(1)
2020–2021	São Pedro Cova	16	(3)
2021–2022	Idanhense	17	(2)
2022–2023	Leça	11	(1)
2023	São Martinho	11	(0)
2023–2024	Vila Real	26	(1)
2024	AFC Câmpulung Muscel	6	(0)

International career
2019	Ghana U20	2	(0)
- * Club domestic league appearances and goals as of 14 December 2024

Pancras Otoo Papi (born 12 May 1999) is a Ghanaian professional footballer who plays as a forward.

== Club career ==
Papi began his youth career at One World Football Academy and later moved to Feyenoord Academy, got promoted and debuted for the senior team WAFA.

He then moved to Europe with a stint at Portuguese club Atlético Clube Alfenense, followed by a move to Oriental Dragon in July 2018 on a one-year contract, with an option to extend for an additional year.

On the start day of the winter transfer window of 2019, Papi moved to fellow league club Sobrado.

On 1 July 2020, he transferred to AD São Pedro Da Cova.

On 1 July 2021, he joined Portuguese side Clube União Idanhense on a year deal.

Prior to the start of the 2022–23 Campeonato de Portugal, Papi joined Leça FC.

Papi signed for São Martinho which compete in the Campeonato de Portugal in 2023.

== International career ==
Papi earned a Ghana U20 call up ahead of the 2019 WAFU Zone B Tournament.
