= C.S. Marítimo C =

Portuguese association football reserve team

- Full name: Club Sport Marítimo C
- Nicknames: Os Verde-Rubros (The Green-and-Red); Os Leões (The Lions)
- Founded: 2012
- Dissolved: 2018
- Ground: Campo da Imaculada Conceição, Funchal
- Capacity: 1,824
- Chairman: Carlos Pereira
- League: MFA Divisão de Honra
- 2017–18: 4th
- Website: www.csmaritimo.org.pt
Home colours	Away colours

Club Sport Marítimo C was a Portuguese football club that played in the MFA Divisão de Honra. It was the second reserve team of Marítimo along with Marítimo B and played home games at the Campo da Imaculada Conceição in Funchal, Madeira.

Founded in 2012, the team played in the 4th tier district leagues until 2018 when it was dissolved and replaced with the newly established Marítimo U23 team. The team won the Taça da Madeira in 2018.

== Notable former players ==
- (Portugal) Fábio China

== Honours ==
- Taça da Madeira

Winners: 2018
Runners-up: 2017

- Supertaça da Madeira

Runners Up: 2017

== Season statistics ==
Season	Division	Pos	Pld	W	D	L	GF	GA	Pts	Top league scorer	Goals	Taça da Madeira
2012–13	MFA Divisão de Honra	4	18	8	4	6	31	31	28	Nuno Andrade	8	QF
2013–14	MFA Divisão de Honra	6	22	9	5	8	39	37	32	–	–	QF
2014–15	Campeonato de Portugal – Serie D	4	18	7	3	8	20	19	24	Elton Ramos	5	–
2015–16	MFA Divisão de Honra	6	22	8	5	9	34	27	29	–	–	SF
2016–17	MFA Divisão de Honra	3	22	11	7	4	47	27	40	–	–	RU
2017–18	MFA Divisão de Honra	4	22	10	7	5	41	22	37	–	–	W

- Last updated: 10 February 2021
- Division = Division; Pos = Position in League; Pld = Played; W = Won; D = Drawn; L = Lost; GF = Goals for; GA = Goals against; Pts = Points
- R5 = Fifth round R4 = Fourth round; R3 = Third round; R2 = Second round; R1 = First round; PO = Play-off; GS = Group stage; R64 = Round of 64; R32 = Round of 32; R16 = Round of 16; QF = Quarter-finals; SF = Semi-finals; RU = Runners-up; W = Winners
