= Abdoul-Aziz Nikiema =

Burkinabé footballer (born 1985)

Personal information
- Date of birth: 12 June 1985 (age 41)
- Place of birth: Ouagadougou, Burkina Faso
- Height: 5 ft 7 in (1.70 m)
- Position: Midfielder

Youth career
- 2000–2002: Planète Champion Ouagadougou

Senior career*
Years	Team	Apps	(Gls)
2002–2005	Bordeaux B	42	(1)
2005–2008	Chamois Niortais	20	(1)
2009	Qingdao Jonoon	27	(4)
2010–2011	Trofense	6	(0)
2011–2012	FC Montaigu		
2012–?	TVEC Les Sables-d'Olonne		

International career
2001–2009	Burkina Faso	12	(1)
- * Club domestic league appearances and goals

Abdoul-Aziz Nikiema is a Burkinabé former professional footballer who played as a midfielder.

== Club career ==
Nikiema began his career with Planète Champion Ouagadougou was in 2001 scouted from Bordeaux. He played 42 games, who scores one goal for the reserve team from Bordeaux and joined than to Ligue 2 club Niort. After three years and 20 games with one goal left Niort and signed in January 2009 with Qingdao Jonoon.

== International career ==
Nikiema earned seven caps for the Burkina Faso national team. He was member on youth side at 2003 FIFA World Youth Championship and 2001 FIFA U-17 World Championship.

== Personal ==
He is the older brother of Victor Nikiema.
