= Fininho (footballer) =

Portuguese footballer

Personal information
- Full name: Hugo Miguel Pereira Cardoso
- Date of birth: March 20, 1983 (age 43)
- Place of birth: Lisbon, Portugal
- Height: 1.83 m (6 ft 0 in)
- Position: Winger

Youth career
- 1997–2003: Odivelas

Senior career*
Years	Team	Apps	(Gls)
2003–2004	Rayo Majadahonda	9	(0)
2004–2005	Málaga B	20	(0)
2005–2006	Real Jaén	14	(1)
2006–2007	Famalicão	6	(0)
2007–2008	Vizela	11	(0)
2008–2009	Gondomar	14	(0)
2009–2011	Lousada	37	(7)
2011–2012	Boiro		
2012–2013	Oliveirense	14	(3)
2013–2016	Vizela	83	(17)
2016–2017	Oliveirense	25	(0)
2018	Barrosas	6	(0)
2019	Serzedelo	11	(1)
- * Club domestic league appearances and goals as of 16:33, 26 January 2021 (UTC)

Hugo Miguel Pereira Cardoso (born 20 March 1983) simply known as Fininho is a Portuguese retired professional footballer who played as a winger.
