= Fábio Gomes (footballer, born 1988) =

Portuguese footballer

Personal information
- Full name: Fábio Ilídio Furtado Gomes
- Date of birth: 21 September 1988 (age 38)
- Place of birth: Lisbon, Portugal
- Height: 1.90 m (6 ft 3 in)
- Position: Forward

Youth career
- 2004–2005: Atlético CP
- 2005–2006: Algés
- 2006–2007: Linda-a-Velha

Senior career*
Years	Team	Apps	(Gls)
2007–2011	Linda-a-Velha		
2011	Moimenta da Beira		
2012	1º Dezembro	15	(3)
2012–2013	Oeiras	19	(3)
2013–2014	Bragança	30	(18)
2014–2015	Farense	18	(2)
2015	Recreativo da Caála	2	(0)
2015–2016	Vizela	10	(0)
2016	Sertanense	13	(4)
2016–2017	Operário	31	(17)
2017–2019	Farense	34	(15)
- * Club domestic league appearances and goals as of 17:30, 15 May 2020 (UTC)

Fábio Ilídio Furtado Gomes (born 21 September 1988) is a Portuguese footballer who plays as a forward.

== Career ==
On 27 July 2014, Gomes made his professional debut with Farense in a 2014–15 Taça da Liga match against Chaves.
