= Mondinense F.C. =

Portuguese sports club

- Full name: Mondinense Futebol Clube
- Founded: 1924
- Ground: Estádio Municipal de Mondim de Basto, Mondim de Basto
- Capacity: 1000
- 2020–21: 10th (relegated)

Mondinense Futebol Clube is a Portuguese sports club from Mondim de Basto.

The men's football team played on the third-tier Campeonato de Portugal in 2015–16, 2017–18 and 2020–21, but were relegated on every occasion.

In the Taça de Portugal, Mondinense notably reached the fourth round of the 2010–11 edition.
