= FC Castrense =

Portuguese football club

- Full name: Futebol Clube Castrense
- Founded: 26 September 1953; 73 years ago
- Ground: Estádio Municipal 25 de Abril, Castro Verde
- Capacity: 8,500
- League: Beja 1ª Divisão
- 2019–20: Beja 1ª Divisão, 7th
- Website: Official website
Home colours	Away colours

Futebol Clube Castrense is a Portuguese football club located in Castro Verde, Portugal.

== Colours and badge ==
Castrense's colours are green and black.
