= C.C.D. Minas de Argozelo =

Portuguese association football club

- Full name: Centro Cultural e Desportivo Minas Argozelo
- Short name: Argozelo
- Founded: 1975
- Ground: Estádio Municipal de Vimioso
- Capacity: 1000
- League: Campeonato de Portugal

The Centro Cultural e Desportivo Minas de Argozelo (often simply referred to as Argozelo) is a semi-professional soccer team of Argozelo parish in the Municipality of Vimioso, District of Bragança, Portugal. The team was founded in 1975 as the works team of the Argozelo Mines, where from 1889 to 1985 tin and tungsten were mined. Their official stadium is Estádio Municipal de Vimioso which is owned by the Vimioso Town Hall. They compete in the semi-professional league Campeonato de Portugal.
