= G.D. Gafanha =

Portuguese association football club

- Full name: Grupo Desportivo da Gafanha
- Founded: 1957; 69 years ago
- Ground: Complexo Desportivo da Gafanha da Nazaré
- Capacity: 1.500
- Chairman: João Paulo Ramos
- Manager: André David
- League: Campeonato de Portugal - Série C
- Website: www.gdg.pt

Grupo Desportivo da Gafanha, founded in 1957, is a sports club from Gafanha da Nazaré, Ílhavo, Portugal.

The club is mainly known by its football team which competes in the third tier of Portuguese league system since 2014–15 season and plays its home games in Complexo Desportivo da Gafanha. Their kit manufacturer is Macron.

The club has also teams competing in other sports including futsal, basketball, and athletics.
