= C.D. Sobrado =

Portuguese sports club

- Full name: Clube Desportivo de Sobrado
- Founded: 1969
- Ground: Campo Joaquim Coelho da Rocha, Valongo
- Capacity: 1000
- League: Elite Série 2 AF Porto
- 2020–21: 15th

Clube Desportivo de Sobrado is a Portuguese sports club from Sobrado, Valongo.

The men's football team plays in the Elite Série 2 AF Porto. The team played in the Campeonato de Portugal, then the third tier of Portuguese football, in the 2014–15 and 2015–16 seasons. The team also contested the Taça de Portugal in the same seasons.
