= A.C. Alcanenense =

Professional Portuguese club

- Full name: Atlético Clube Alcanenense
- Founded: 1942
- Ground: Estádio Joaquim Maria Batista, Alcanena
- Capacity: 5000
- Chairman: Rui Tourinho
- Manager: Luís Faria

Atlético Clube Alcanenense is a Professional Portuguese sports club from Alcanena.

The men's football team played on the third tier when it was called Segunda Divisão B, being relegated in 1996–97, and later again played on the third tier until being relegated from the 2017–18 Campeonato de Portugal.

== Notable players ==
- (Chile) Cristóbal Campos
- (Turkey) Merih Demiral
