= UD Sousense =

Portuguese association football club

Sousense
- Full name: União Desportiva Sousense
- Founded: 1937
- Ground: Estádio 1º de Dezembro; Foz de Sousa, Gondomar; Portugal
- Capacity: 2,000
- Chairman: José António Martino
- Head Coach: Hélder Nunes
- League: Campeonato de Portugal
- 2015–16: Relegation Groups, Serie C, 2nd
- Website: http://www.wix.com/udsousense/com
Home colours

União Desportiva Sousense (abbreviated as UD Sousense) is a Portuguese football club based in Foz de Sousa, Gondomar in the district of Porto.

== Background ==
UD Sousense currently plays in the Campeonato de Portugal which is the third tier of Portuguese football. The club was founded on 1 December 1937 and they play their home matches at the Estádio 1º de Dezembro in Foz de Sousa, Gondomar. The stadium is able to accommodate 2,000 spectators. Sousense played for the first 70 years of existence in the regional leagues of Porto. In the 2009–10 season, the club won the championship, thus gaining promotion to the fourth level for the first time.

The club is affiliated to Associação de Futebol do Porto and has competed in the AF Porto Taça. The club has also entered the national cup competition known as Taça de Portugal on a few occasions.

== Current squad ==
As of 10 April 2017

Note: Flags indicate national team as defined under FIFA eligibility rules; some limited exceptions apply. Players may hold more than one non-FIFA nationality.

No.	Pos.	Nation	Player
1	GK	(Portugal) POR	Fábio Lopes
2	DF	(Portugal) POR	Luís Costa
3	DF	(Portugal) POR	Roberto Flores
4	DF	(Portugal) POR	João Paulo
7	FW	(Portugal) POR	Zé Augusto
10	FW	(Portugal) POR	Chico
11	DF	(Portugal) POR	Vitor Hugo
12	GK	(Portugal) POR	Stéphane
13	DF	(Portugal) POR	João Oliveira
14	MF	(Portugal) POR	Nuno Pereira
16	MF	(Portugal) POR	Flávio Igor

No.	Pos.	Nation	Player
17	FW	(Portugal) POR	Ângelo
18	MF	(Portugal) POR	Vítor Andrade
19	FW	(Portugal) POR	Zé Miguel
20	MF	(Portugal) POR	Telmo Fereira
21	MF	(Portugal) POR	Paulinho
—	GK	(Portugal) POR	André Alexandre
—	DF	(Portugal) POR	Futre
—	DF	(Portugal) POR	Alex Ferreira
—	MF	(Portugal) POR	Tozé Neves
—	MF	(Portugal) POR	Marco
—	FW	(Portugal) POR	Rui Soares

== Season to season ==
Season	Level	Division	Section	Place	Movements
1990–91	Tier 6	Distritais	AF Porto – 2ª Divisão 2		Promoted
1991–92	Tier 5	Distritais	AF Porto – 1ª Divisão 2		
1992–93	Tier 5	Distritais	AF Porto – Honra		
1993–94	Tier 5	Distritais	AF Porto – Honra		
1994–95	Tier 5	Distritais	AF Porto – Honra		
1995–96	Tier 5	Distritais	AF Porto – Honra		
1996–97	Tier 5	Distritais	AF Porto – 1ª Divisão		
1997–98	Tier 5	Distritais	AF Porto – Honra		
1998–99	Tier 5	Distritais	AF Porto – Honra	11th	
1999–2000	Tier 5	Distritais	AF Porto – Honra		
2000–01	Tier 5	Distritais	AF Porto – Honra	11th	
2001–02	Tier 5	Distritais	AF Porto – Honra	3rd	
2002–03	Tier 5	Distritais	AF Porto – Honra	5th	
2003–04	Tier 5	Distritais	AF Porto – Honra	7th	
2004–05	Tier 5	Distritais	AF Porto – Honra	9th	
2005–06	Tier 5	Distritais	AF Porto – Honra	16th	Relegated
2006–07	Tier 6	Distritais	AF Porto – 1ª Divisão 2	1st	Promoted
2007–08	Tier 5	Distritais	AF Porto – Honra	6th	
2008–09	Tier 5	Distritais	AF Porto – Honra	5th	
2009–10	Tier 5	Distritais	AF Porto – Honra	1st	Promoted
2010–11	Tier 4	Terceira Divisão	Série B – 1ª Fase	6th	Promotion Group
	Tier 4	Terceira Divisão	Série B Fase Final	6th	
2011–12	Tier 4	Terceira Divisão	Série B – 1ª Fase	3rd	Promotion Group
	Tier 4	Terceira Divisão	Série B Fase Final	3rd	

== Honours ==
- AF Porto Divisão de Honra: 2009/10

== See also ==
- Apito Dourado
