= A.D. Nogueirense =

Portuguese sports club

- Full name: Associação Desportiva Nogueirense
- Founded: 1973
- Ground: Estádio de Santo António, Oliveira do Hospital
- Capacity: 3,000
- League: Honra A AF Coimbra
- 2020–21: 6th

Associação Desportiva Nogueirense is a Portuguese sports club from Nogueira do Cravo, Oliveira do Hospital.

The men's football team plays in the Honra A AF Coimbra. The team won the Honra AF Coimbra in 2009–10, leading to two seasons in the Terceira Divisão before a long stint on the third tier. First in the 2012–13 Segunda Divisão, then after the league changed its name to the CNS and then CDP, Nogueirense were relegated from the 2018–19 Campeonato de Portugal.
