= Mortágua F.C. =

Portuguese sports club

- Full name: Mortágua Futebol Clube
- Founded: 1937
- Ground: Campo da Gandarada, Mortágua
- Capacity: 2000
- League: Campeonato de Portugal
- 2021–22: Portuguese District Championships, promoted

Mortágua Futebol Clube is a Portuguese sports club from Mortágua, Viseu District.

The men's football team played on the third-tier Campeonato de Portugal until being relegated in 2020–21. They returned to Campeonato de Portugal (now the fourth tier after the Portuguese league system reorganization) for the 2022–23 season.

In the Taça de Portugal, Mortágua notably reached the third round in both 2014–15 and 2016–17.
