= AD Oliveirense =

Portuguese sports club

- Full name: Associação Desportiva Oliveirense
- Founded: 1952
- Ground: Estádio de Ribes, Santa Maria de Oliveira
- Capacity: 3500
- League: II Série C AF Braga
- 2020–21: cancelled (covid)

Associação Desportiva Oliveirense is a Portuguese sports club from Santa Maria de Oliveira, Vila Nova de Famalicão.

The men's football team played several years on the third tier, and was supposed to contest the 2020–21 Campeonato de Portugal. However they filed for bankruptcy and was denied a license. Vilaverdense was invited as third-place finishers in AF Braga's District League and accepted the invitation. AD Oliveirense subsequently played in AF Braga's II Série C.
