= Moura AC =

Portuguese association football club

Moura
- Full name: Moura Atldético Clube
- Ground: Estádio do Moura Atlético Clube
- Capacity: 3,000
- Chairman: Luís Jacob
- Coach: Tiago Raposo
- Website: http://www.mouraatleticoclube.pt/

Moura Atlético Clube is a Portuguese club founded in 1942 and located in Moura, Beja.

== History ==
The club was founded on January 17, 1942, and its current president is Hélder Feliciano. Since the 2013–2014 season, the football team competes in Campeonato de Portugal, the third-level of Portuguese football. Its stadium was funded in 2000 and it has the capacity for 3,000 spectators.
