= Lusitano FCV =

Portuguese association football club

- Full name: Lusitano Futebol Clube de Vildemoinhos
- Founded: 14 August 1916
- Ground: Estádio dos Trambelos
- Capacity: 3,300
- 2020–21 CDP: relegated
- Website: http://www.lusitanofutebolclube.pt/

Lusitano Futebol Clube de Vildemoinhos is a Portuguese football club from the parish of Vildemoinhos in the city of Viseu. The club was founded on 14 August 1916 and plays in fifth tier of the Portuguese football league system.

In the 2018–19 Taça de Portugal, Lusitano lost the first round 4–2 at home to S.C. Beira-Mar, but were one of 22 teams restored to the second round, where they won on penalties at F.C. Oliveira do Hospital. In the third round, the team won 4–3 after extra time against Primeira Liga club C.D. Nacional. They were drawn to host top-flight club Sporting Clube de Portugal in the fourth round, and lost 4–1 to the eventual champions.
