= S.C. Coimbrões =

- Full name: Sporting Clube de Coimbrões
- Founded: 25 October 1920; 105 years ago
- Ground: Parque Silva Matos
- Capacity: 1,500
- League: Porto Football Association Liga Pro
- 2025–26: 13th of 18

Sporting Clube de Coimbrões is a Portuguese football club from Vila Nova de Gaia, in the Porto metropolitan area. Founded in 1920, the club plays in the Porto Football Association's Liga Pro, in the fifth tier of the Portuguese football league system.

== History ==
The club was founded on 25 October 1920 by young workers including Joaquim Silva Matos, whose name was given to its ground.

The club won the Porto Football Association's elite division in 2007–08, followed by the national fourth-tier Terceira Divisão in 2009–10. The club remained in the then third-tier Campeonato de Portugal until 2021, when they were relegated back to the district leagues. In 2023–24, the club won the district league as well as the cup, for an unprecedented double.

In the Taça de Portugal, Coimbrões reached the fourth round in 2012–13, losing 2–1 away to second-tier C.D. Aves. In the third round in 2014–15, the club hosted Rio Ave F.C. from the Primeira Liga and lost by a single goal.

Coimbrões hosted top-flight FC Porto in the third round in the 2018–19 Taça de Portugal; the two clubs are located within ten kilometres of each other. The local ground, known as the "San Siro" after the large stadium in Milan, lacked the lighting required by the Portuguese Football Federation to host the match, and so it was moved to the Estádio Municipal Jorge Sampaio, which although also in Gaia is the home of FC Porto B. On 19 October, Porto won the match 5–0.

== Other departments ==
Cyclist Belmiro Silva won the 1978 Volta a Portugal representing the club.
