= 2020–21 Campeonato de Portugal =

8th season of the Campeonato de Portugal football league

Campeonato de Portugal
- Season: 2020–21
- Champions: Trofense
- Promoted: Trofense; Estrela da Amadora

The 2020–21 Campeonato de Portugal was the eighth season of Portuguese football's renovated third-tier league, since the merging of the Segunda Divisão and Terceira Divisão in 2013, the sixth season under the current Campeonato de Portugal title, and the 74th season of recognised third-tier football in Portugal. A total of 96 teams competed in this division.

Due to the cancellation of all non-professional competitions in the country due to the COVID-19 pandemic in Portugal on the previous season, no teams were relegated, which lead to an additional team from each of the 20 district championships. The Portuguese Football Federation decided the creation of the Liga 3, a new tier in the Portuguese league system, beginning with the 2021–22 season, as well as a new format for Campeonato de Portugal, including the addition of four reserve teams invited from Primeira Liga clubs raising the total number of teams from 72 to 96. This new format will reduce the total number of teams to 56 on the next season.

== Format ==
The new competition format consists of three stages. In the first stage, the 96 clubs were divided in eight series of 12 teams, according to geographic criteria, with a maximum of two reserve teams in each series. In each series, teams played against each other in a home-and-away double round-robin system.

In the second stage, the best-placed teams of each of eight Series advanced to the promotion series, teams placed from second to fifth qualified for Liga 3 qualification Series, bottom 4 teams were relegated to the District Championships and remaining teams stayed in Campeonato de Portugal. On the promotion series, the 8 teams were divided in two series of 4 teams, the winners of each series being promoted to LigaPro, remaining teams qualified for Liga 3. On the Liga 3 qualification Series, the 32 teams were divided in eight series of 4 teams, the two best-placed teams of each series qualified for Liga 3. In both promotion Series and Liga 3 qualification Series, teams played against each other in a home-and-away double round-robin system.

In the third stage, the best-placed teams of the two promotion series faced each other on a neutral venue to decide the champion.

== Teams ==
Location of teams of the 2020–21 Campeonato de Portugal first stage (Mainland).
Brown: Serie A; Red: Serie B; Orange: Serie C; Yellow: Serie D;
Green: Serie E; Blue: Serie F; Purple: Serie G; Pink: Serie H.
Location of teams of the 2020–21 Campeonato de Portugal (Madeira).
Red: Serie B; Orange: Serie C.
Location of teams of the 2020–21 Campeonato de Portugal (Azores).
Purple: Serie G.

Relegated from 2019–20 Primeira Liga:

- ~~Cova da Piedade~~ Vitória de Setúbal (Note: Vitória de Setúbal and Desportivo das Aves (16th and 18th placed teams in 2019–20 Primeira Liga) were punished by the Portuguese Professional Football League for failing to produce valid licensing documentation with direct relegation to 2020-21 Campeonato de Portugal and, because of that, Cova da Piedade and Casa Pia (17th and 18th placed teams in 2019-20 LigaPro) were not relegated.)
- ~~Casa Pia~~ Desportivo das Aves (Note: Desportivo das Aves gave up from the competition after the first stage draw. For that reason, the team wasn't replaced and first stage serie B was to be played with 11 teams.)

From Serie A:

- Fafe
- Vitória SC B
- Braga B
- Merelinense
- São Martinho
- Maria da Fonte
- Marítimo B
- Montalegre
- Berço
- ~~Chaves Satélite~~ (Note: Chaves decided to end their reserve-team project. In this case, Vidago was invited as AF Vila Real District League Runner-Up and accepted the invitation.)
- Mirandela
- União da Madeira (Note: Camacha, Câmara de Lobos and União da Madeira withdrew from the competition on 7 January 2021, due to COVID-19 restrictions imposed by the Madeira regional government that prevented amateur clubs to play matches since October. For that reason, the three teams were guaranteed to play in the 2021–22 Campeonato de Portugal and all of their played matches were declared null. The first stage serie B and C were concluded with 10 teams respectively.)
- Pedras Salgadas
- Cerveira
- Bragança
- ~~AD Oliveirense~~ (Note: AD Oliveirense filed for bankruptcy and so the license for competition was denied. In this case, Vilaverdense was invited as AF Braga District League 3rd Place and accepted the invitation.)
- Câmara de Lobos

From Serie B:

- Lusitânia Lourosa
- Sp. Espinho
- Leça
- Castro Daire
- Sanjoanense
- Felgueiras
- Paredes
- Canelas 2010
- Amarante
- Coimbrões
- Trofense
- Pedras Rubras
- Gondomar
- Lusitano Vildemoinhos
- Valadares Gaia
- Vila Real
- ~~Ginásio Figueirense~~ (Note: Ginásio Figueirense withdrew from the competition. In this case, Brito was invited as AF Braga District League Runner-Up (AF Braga is the second Football Association with most teams in national leagues) and accepted the invitation.)

From Serie C:

- Praiense
- Benfica Castelo Branco
- Anadia
- Sertanense
- Fátima (Note: Fátima withdrew from the competition after declaring bankruptcy on December 1, 2020. For that reason, all the matches they played we're declared null and the first stage serie F was concluded with 11 teams.)
- Beira-Mar
- Caldas
- Condeixa
- Torreense
- Oleiros
- Marinhense
- União de Leiria
- Águeda
- Oliveira do Hospital
- União de Santarém
- Sp. Ideal
- Vitória de Sernache
- Fontinhas

From Serie D:

- Olhanense
- Real
- Alverca
- Louletano
- Sintrense
- Pinhalnovense
- Loures
- Oriental
- 1.º de Dezembro
- Amora
- Esperança de Lagos
- Armacenenses (Note: Armacenenses withdrew from the competition after the first stage draw. For that reason, the team wasn't replaced and first stage serie H was played with 11 teams.)
- Olímpico Montijo
- Sacavenense
- Lusitano de Évora
- Fabril Barreiro
- Aljustrelense
- ~~Sintra Football~~ Estrela da Amadora (Note: Estrela da Amadora takes Sintra Football place in the competition due to a fusion between both clubs.)

Promoted from 2019 to 2020 District Championships:

- Algarve FA: Moncarapachense
- Aveiro FA: São João de Ver
- Azores Champ.: Rabo de Peixe
- Beja FA: Moura
- Braga FA: Pevidém, Brito and Vilaverdense
- Bragança FA: Águia Vimioso
- Castelo Branco FA: Alcains
- Coimbra FA: Carapinheirense
- Évora FA: Juventude de Évora
- Guarda FA: ~~Sp. Mêda~~ Vila Cortês (Note: Sp. Mêda withdrew from the competition. In this case, Manteigas was invited as AF Guarda District League Runner-Up but declined the invitation. The following team, Vila Cortês, which was AF Guarda District League 3rd place, accepted the invitation.)
- Leiria FA: GRAP (Note: GRAP withdrew from the competition on January 25, 2021. For that reason, all the matches they played were declared null and the first stage serie E was concluded with 11 teams.)
- Lisboa FA: Pêro Pinheiro and Lourinhanense (Note: Lourinhanense took place on the competition as AF Lisboa District League Runner-Up due to only three out of four reserve team places being filled.)
- Madeira FA: Camacha
- Portalegre FA: ~~Crato~~ (Note: Crato, Portalegre FA District League Champions declined to be promoted and the 2nd to 5th-classified of Portalegre FA District League teams declined as well. In this case, Tirsense was invited as AF Porto District League Runner-Up (AF Porto is the Football Association with most teams in national leagues) and accepted the invitation.)
- Porto FA: Salgueiros and Tirsense
- Santarém FA: União Almeirim
- Setúbal FA: Oriental Dragon
- Viana do Castelo FA: Vianense
- Vila Real FA: Mondinense and Vidago
- Viseu FA: Mortágua

Invited reserve teams:

- Sporting B
- Rio Ave B
- Belenenses SAD B

== First stage ==
The first stage schedule was drawn on 4 September 2020 and were played from 20 September 2020 to 3 April 2021.

=== Serie A ===
Pos	Team	Pld	W	D	L	GF	GA	GD	Pts	Qualification or relegation
1	Braga B (Q)	22	17	4	1	61	12	+49	55	Advance to Promotion Series
2	Merelinense (Q)	22	15	3	4	34	13	+21	48	Advance to Liga 3 qualification Series
3	Montalegre (Q)	22	10	8	4	36	24	+12	38	Advance to Liga 3 qualification Series
4	Mirandela (Q)	22	9	8	5	24	16	+8	35	Advance to Liga 3 qualification Series
5	Maria da Fonte (Q)	22	9	5	8	30	29	+1	32	Advance to Liga 3 qualification Series
6	Vianense	22	9	5	8	26	28	−2	32	
7	Vilaverdense	22	7	7	8	28	30	−2	28	
8	Pedras Salgadas	22	6	8	8	19	23	−4	26	
9	Vidago (R)	22	6	5	11	27	36	−9	23	Relegation to District Championship
10	Bragança (R)	22	4	8	10	16	25	−9	20	Relegation to District Championship
11	Cerveira (R)	22	3	6	13	11	27	−16	15	Relegation to District Championship
12	Águia Vimioso (R)	22	1	5	16	12	61	−49	8	Relegation to District Championship

Updated to match(es) played on 11 April 2021. Source: FPF.pt
Rules for classification: 1) Points, 2) Head-to-head points, 3) Head-to-head goal difference, 4) Goal difference, 5) Matches won, 6) Goals scored
(Q) Qualified for the phase indicated; (R) Relegated

=== Serie B ===
Pos	Team	Pld	W	D	L	GF	GA	GD	Pts	Qualification or relegation
1	Pevidém (Q)	18	9	7	2	27	16	+11	34	Advance to Promotion Series
2	Fafe (Q)	18	10	4	4	25	17	+8	34	Advance to Liga 3 qualification Series
3	Vitória SC B (Q)	18	8	8	2	33	14	+19	32	Advance to Liga 3 qualification Series
4	Felgueiras (Q)	18	8	7	3	26	17	+9	31	Advance to Liga 3 qualification Series
5	São Martinho (Q)	18	7	6	5	24	20	+4	27	Advance to Liga 3 qualification Series
6	Berço	18	7	5	6	30	27	+3	26	
7	Rio Ave B	18	7	4	7	23	23	0	25	
8	Tirsense	18	6	3	9	21	29	−8	21	
9	Brito (R)	18	3	5	10	20	31	−11	14	Relegation to District Championship
10	Mondinense (R)	18	0	1	17	11	46	−35	1	Relegation to District Championship
11	Camacha	0	0	0	0	0	0	0	0	Withdrew
12	Desportivo das Aves	0	0	0	0	0	0	0	0	Withdrew

Updated to match(es) played on 10 April 2021. Source: FPF.pt
Rules for classification: 1) Points, 2) Head-to-head points, 3) Head-to-head goal difference, 4) Goal difference, 5) Matches won, 6) Goals scored
(Q) Qualified for the phase indicated; (R) Relegated

=== Serie C ===
Pos	Team	Pld	W	D	L	GF	GA	GD	Pts	Qualification or relegation
1	Trofense (Q)	18	10	6	2	17	6	+11	36	Advance to Promotion Series
2	Leça (Q)	18	10	4	4	26	18	+8	34	Advance to Liga 3 qualification Series
3	Gondomar (Q)	18	10	4	4	26	13	+13	34	Advance to Liga 3 qualification Series
4	Marítimo B (Q)	18	9	3	6	29	15	+14	30	Advance to Liga 3 qualification Series
5	Amarante (Q)	18	7	3	8	15	17	−2	24	Advance to Liga 3 qualification Series
6	Salgueiros	18	6	4	8	19	18	+1	22	
7	Paredes	18	5	5	8	9	15	−6	20	
8	Vila Real	18	5	4	9	16	25	−9	19	
9	Pedras Rubras (R)	18	5	2	11	12	27	−15	17	Relegation to District Championship
10	Coimbrões (R)	18	4	3	11	14	29	−15	15	Relegation to District Championship
11	União da Madeira	0	0	0	0	0	0	0	0	Withdrew
12	Câmara de Lobos	0	0	0	0	0	0	0	0	Withdrew

Updated to match(es) played on 11 April 2021. Source: FPF.pt
Rules for classification: 1) Points, 2) Head-to-head points, 3) Head-to-head goal difference, 4) Goal difference, 5) Matches won, 6) Goals scored
(Q) Qualified for the phase indicated; (R) Relegated

=== Serie D ===
Pos	Team	Pld	W	D	L	GF	GA	GD	Pts	Qualification or relegation
1	Anadia (Q)	22	13	5	4	39	15	+24	44	Advance to Promotion Series
2	Canelas 2010 (Q)	22	12	5	5	28	13	+15	41	Advance to Liga 3 qualification Series
3	Lusitânia Lourosa (Q)	22	11	6	5	38	26	+12	39	Advance to Liga 3 qualification Series
4	São João de Ver (Q)	22	10	8	4	30	14	+16	38	Advance to Liga 3 qualification Series
5	Sanjoanense (Q)	22	8	12	2	26	13	+13	36	Advance to Liga 3 qualification Series
6	Castro Daire	22	10	5	7	23	24	−1	35	
7	Valadares	22	10	3	9	36	27	+9	33	
8	Espinho	22	9	4	9	33	22	+11	31	
9	Beira-Mar (R)	22	9	4	9	30	23	+7	31	Relegation to District Championship
10	Águeda (R)	22	4	5	13	17	28	−11	17	Relegation to District Championship
11	Lusitano Vildemoinhos (R)	22	4	4	14	17	34	−17	16	Relegation to District Championship
12	Vila Cortez (R)	22	1	1	20	8	86	−78	4	Relegation to District Championship

Updated to match(es) played on 10 April 2021. Source: FPF.pt
Rules for classification: 1) Points, 2) Head-to-head points, 3) Head-to-head goal difference, 4) Goal difference, 5) Matches won, 6) Goals scored
(Q) Qualified for the phase indicated; (R) Relegated

=== Serie E ===
Pos	Team	Pld	W	D	L	GF	GA	GD	Pts	Qualification or relegation
1	União de Leiria (Q)	20	14	5	1	34	9	+25	47	Advance to Promotion Series
2	Oliveira do Hospital (Q)	20	9	7	4	24	19	+5	34	Advance to Liga 3 qualification Series
3	Benfica Castelo Branco (Q)	20	8	8	4	21	14	+7	32	Advance to Liga 3 qualification Series
4	Condeixa (Q)	20	7	8	5	18	17	+1	29	Advance to Liga 3 qualification Series
5	Marinhense (Q)	20	8	4	8	23	21	+2	28	Advance to Liga 3 qualification Series
6	Oleiros	20	6	8	6	28	27	+1	26	
7	Sertanense	20	4	9	7	22	24	−2	21	
8	Vitória de Sernache	20	5	6	9	25	28	−3	21	
9	Carapinheirense (R)	20	5	6	9	21	26	−5	21	Relegation to District Championship
10	Alcains (R)	20	3	8	9	14	34	−20	17	Relegation to District Championship
11	Mortágua (R)	20	1	11	8	15	26	−11	14	Relegation to District Championship
12	GRAP	0	0	0	0	0	0	0	0	Withdrew

Updated to match(es) played on 10 April 2021. Source: FPF.pt
Rules for classification: 1) Points, 2) Head-to-head points, 3) Head-to-head goal difference, 4) Goal difference, 5) Matches won, 6) Goals scored
(Q) Qualified for the phase indicated; (R) Relegated

=== Serie F ===
Pos	Team	Pld	W	D	L	GF	GA	GD	Pts	Qualification or relegation
1	Torreense (Q)	20	15	3	2	37	10	+27	48	Advance to Promotion Series
2	Alverca (Q)	20	15	2	3	38	10	+28	47	Advance to Liga 3 qualification Series
3	União de Santarém (Q)	20	10	5	5	31	23	+8	35	Advance to Liga 3 qualification Series
4	Caldas (Q)	20	9	3	8	24	25	−1	30	Advance to Liga 3 qualification Series
5	Loures (Q)	20	8	5	7	19	19	0	29	Advance to Liga 3 qualification Series
6	Sintrense	20	9	1	10	28	30	−2	28	
7	Sacavenense	20	5	7	8	19	23	−4	22	
8	Pêro Pinheiro	20	5	6	9	10	17	−7	21	
9	1.º de Dezembro (R)	20	4	7	9	16	26	−10	19	Relegation to District Championship
10	União Almeirim (R)	20	4	4	12	14	26	−12	16	Relegation to District Championship
11	Lourinhanense (R)	20	1	7	12	15	42	−27	10	Relegation to District Championship
12	Fátima	0	0	0	0	0	0	0	0	Withdrew

Updated to match(es) played on 11 April 2021. Source: FPF.pt
Rules for classification: 1) Points, 2) Head-to-head points, 3) Head-to-head goal difference, 4) Goal difference, 5) Matches won, 6) Goals scored
(Q) Qualified for the phase indicated; (R) Relegated

=== Serie G ===
Pos	Team	Pld	W	D	L	GF	GA	GD	Pts	Qualification or relegation
1	Estrela da Amadora (Q)	22	16	5	1	34	12	+22	53	Advance to Promotion Series
2	Sporting CP B (Q)	22	14	7	1	33	7	+26	49	Advance to Liga 3 qualification Series
3	Oriental Dragon (Q)	22	11	4	7	30	20	+10	37	Advance to Liga 3 qualification Series
4	Praiense (Q)	22	8	8	6	25	23	+2	32	Advance to Liga 3 qualification Series
5	Real SC (Q)	22	9	5	8	32	23	+9	32	Advance to Liga 3 qualification Series
6	Fontinhas	22	9	5	8	30	26	+4	32	
7	Rabo de Peixe	22	7	6	9	17	25	−8	27	
8	Sp. Ideal	22	5	8	9	26	34	−8	23	
9	Belenenses SAD B (R)	22	5	7	10	16	26	−10	22	Relegation to District Championship
10	Fabril Barreiro (R)	22	5	6	11	19	31	−12	21	Relegation to District Championship
11	Oriental (R)	22	3	7	12	16	27	−11	16	Relegation to District Championship
12	Olímpico Montijo (R)	22	4	4	14	19	43	−24	16	Relegation to District Championship

Updated to match(es) played on 11 April 2021. Source: FPF.pt
Rules for classification: 1) Points, 2) Head-to-head points, 3) Head-to-head goal difference, 4) Goal difference, 5) Matches won, 6) Goals scored
(Q) Qualified for the phase indicated; (R) Relegated

=== Serie H ===
Pos	Team	Pld	W	D	L	GF	GA	GD	Pts	Qualification or relegation
1	Vitória de Setúbal (Q)	20	15	5	0	49	20	+29	50	Advance to Promotion Series
2	Amora (Q)	20	13	5	2	34	13	+21	44	Advance to Liga 3 qualification Series
3	Olhanense (Q)	20	10	5	5	27	17	+10	35	Advance to Liga 3 qualification Series
4	Louletano (Q)	20	8	10	2	30	18	+12	34	Advance to Liga 3 qualification Series
5	Moncarapachense (Q)	20	6	7	7	22	21	+1	25	Advance to Liga 3 qualification Series
6	Pinhalnovense	20	7	4	9	26	30	−4	25	
7	Juventude de Évora	20	6	6	8	27	36	−9	24	
8	Esperança de Lagos	20	6	5	9	25	26	−1	23	
9	Lusitano de Évora (R)	20	6	5	9	19	23	−4	23	Relegation to District Championship
10	Aljustrelense (R)	20	4	2	14	12	41	−29	14	Relegation to District Championship
11	Moura (R)	20	0	4	16	17	43	−26	4	Relegation to District Championship
12	Armacenenses	0	0	0	0	0	0	0	0	Withdrew

Updated to match(es) played on 10 April 2021. Source: FPF.pt
Rules for classification: 1) Points, 2) Head-to-head points, 3) Head-to-head goal difference, 4) Goal difference, 5) Matches won, 6) Goals scored
(Q) Qualified for the phase indicated; (R) Relegated

== Second stage ==
Both promotion series and Terceira Liga qualification series were played from 18 April 2021 to 22 May 2021.

=== Promotion series ===
==== North Serie ====
Pos	Team	Pld	W	D	L	GF	GA	GD	Pts	Promotion or qualification
1	Trofense (P)	6	3	2	1	9	3	+6	11	Promotion to Liga Portugal 2
2	Anadia	6	3	1	2	8	7	+1	10	Qualification to Liga 3
3	Pevidém	6	3	0	3	5	7	−2	9	Qualification to Liga 3
4	Braga B	6	1	1	4	6	11	−5	4	Qualification to Liga 3

Updated to match(es) played on 29 May 2021. Source: FPF.pt
Rules for classification: 1) Points, 2) Head-to-head points, 3) Head-to-head goal difference, 4) Goal difference, 5) Matches won, 6) Goals scored
(P) Promoted

==== South Serie ====
Pos	Team	Pld	W	D	L	GF	GA	GD	Pts	Promotion or qualification
1	Estrela da Amadora (P)	6	3	2	1	9	4	+5	11 (Note: Estrela da Amadora are ranked ahead of Torreense on head-to-head points: Estrela da Amadora 4, Torreense 1.)	Promotion to Liga Portugal 2
2	Torreense	6	3	2	1	6	5	+1	11	Qualification to Liga 3
3	Vitória de Setúbal	6	2	1	3	7	9	−2	7	Qualification to Liga 3
4	União de Leiria	6	1	1	4	5	9	−4	4	Qualification to Liga 3

Updated to match(es) played on 30 May 2021. Source: FPF.pt
Rules for classification: 1) Points, 2) Head-to-head points, 3) Head-to-head goal difference, 4) Goal difference, 5) Matches won, 6) Goals scored
(P) Promoted

=== Liga 3 qualification Series ===
==== Serie 1 ====
Pos	Team	Pld	W	D	L	GF	GA	GD	Pts	Qualification
1	Montalegre (Q)	6	3	1	2	6	5	+1	10	Qualification to Liga 3
2	Felgueiras 1932 (Q)	6	2	3	1	6	5	+1	9	Qualification to Liga 3
3	Merelinense	6	2	1	3	5	5	0	7 (Note: Merelinense are ranked ahead of São Martinho on goal difference.)	
4	São Martinho	6	2	1	3	6	8	−2	7	

Updated to match(es) played on 29 May 2021. Source: FPF.pt
Rules for classification: 1) Points, 2) Head-to-head points, 3) Head-to-head goal difference, 4) Goal difference, 5) Matches won, 6) Goals scored
(Q) Qualified for the phase indicated

==== Serie 2 ====
Pos	Team	Pld	W	D	L	GF	GA	GD	Pts	Qualification
1	Vitória SC B (Q)	6	4	1	1	13	6	+7	13	Qualification to Liga 3
2	Fafe (Q)	6	2	3	1	6	5	+1	9	Qualification to Liga 3
3	Maria da Fonte	6	2	1	3	6	9	−3	7	
4	Mirandela	6	1	1	4	5	10	−5	4	

Updated to match(es) played on 30 May 2021. Source: FPF.pt
Rules for classification: 1) Points, 2) Head-to-head points, 3) Head-to-head goal difference, 4) Goal difference, 5) Matches won, 6) Goals scored
(Q) Qualified for the phase indicated

==== Serie 3 ====
Pos	Team	Pld	W	D	L	GF	GA	GD	Pts	Qualification
1	São João de Ver (Q)	6	2	4	0	4	2	+2	10	Qualification to Liga 3
2	Leça	6	2	3	1	6	4	+2	9	
3	Sanjoanense (Note: Leça failed to produce valid licensing documentation to compete in the 2021–22 season of the Liga 3, so they had their promotion denied by the Portuguese Football Federation. As a result, Sanjoanense (3rd place) were invited to play in the third tier for the 2021–22 season.) (Q)	6	2	1	3	4	6	−2	7	Qualification to Liga 3
4	Gondomar	6	1	2	3	4	6	−2	5	

Updated to match(es) played on 30 May 2021. Source: FPF.pt
Rules for classification: 1) Points, 2) Head-to-head points, 3) Head-to-head goal difference, 4) Goal difference, 5) Matches won, 6) Goals scored
(Q) Qualified for the phase indicated

==== Serie 4 ====
Pos	Team	Pld	W	D	L	GF	GA	GD	Pts	Qualification
1	Canelas 2010 (Q)	6	3	2	1	10	7	+3	11	Qualification to Liga 3
2	Lusitânia Lourosa (Q)	6	2	4	0	5	2	+3	10	Qualification to Liga 3
3	Marítimo B	6	2	0	4	7	10	−3	6	
4	Amarante	6	1	2	3	4	7	−3	5	

Updated to match(es) played on 30 May 2021. Source: FPF.pt
Rules for classification: 1) Points, 2) Head-to-head points, 3) Head-to-head goal difference, 4) Goal difference, 5) Matches won, 6) Goals scored
(Q) Qualified for the phase indicated

==== Serie 5 ====
Pos	Team	Pld	W	D	L	GF	GA	GD	Pts	Qualification
1	Oliveira do Hospital (Q)	6	1	5	0	7	6	+1	8 (Note: Oliveira do Hospital are ranked ahead of Caldas on head-to-head points: Oliveira do Hospital 4, Caldas 1.)	Qualification to Liga 3
2	Caldas (Q)	6	2	2	2	7	7	0	8	Qualification to Liga 3
3	Loures	6	1	4	1	4	4	0	7	
4	Benfica Castelo Branco	6	1	3	2	7	8	−1	6	

Updated to match(es) played on 29 May 2021. Source: FPF.pt
Rules for classification: 1) Points, 2) Head-to-head points, 3) Head-to-head goal difference, 4) Goal difference, 5) Matches won, 6) Goals scored
(Q) Qualified for the phase indicated

==== Serie 6 ====
Pos	Team	Pld	W	D	L	GF	GA	GD	Pts	Qualification
1	Alverca (Q)	6	3	3	0	12	4	+8	12	Qualification to Liga 3
2	União de Santarém (Q)	6	2	3	1	8	6	+2	9	Qualification to Liga 3
3	Marinhense	6	1	2	3	4	12	−8	5 (Note: Marinhense are ranked ahead of Condeixa on head-to-head points: Marinhense 4, Condeixa 1.)	
4	Condeixa	6	1	2	3	7	9	−2	5	

Updated to match(es) played on 30 May 2021. Source: FPF.pt
Rules for classification: 1) Points, 2) Head-to-head points, 3) Head-to-head goal difference, 4) Goal difference, 5) Matches won, 6) Goals scored
(Q) Qualified for the phase indicated

==== Serie 7 ====
Pos	Team	Pld	W	D	L	GF	GA	GD	Pts	Qualification
1	Oriental Dragon (Q)	6	3	2	1	7	4	+3	11 (Note: Oriental Dragon are ranked ahead of Sporting B on head-to-head points: Oriental Dragon 4, Sporting B 1.)	Qualification to Liga 3
2	Sporting CP B (Q)	6	3	2	1	10	7	+3	11	Qualification to Liga 3
3	Louletano	6	2	0	4	7	8	−1	6	
4	Moncarapachense	6	1	2	3	4	9	−5	5	

Updated to match(es) played on 29 May 2021. Source: FPF.pt
Rules for classification: 1) Points, 2) Head-to-head points, 3) Head-to-head goal difference, 4) Goal difference, 5) Matches won, 6) Goals scored
(Q) Qualified for the phase indicated

==== Serie 8 ====
Pos	Team	Pld	W	D	L	GF	GA	GD	Pts	Qualification
1	Amora (Q)	6	3	3	0	11	6	+5	12	Qualification to Liga 3
2	Real SC (Q)	6	2	2	2	6	7	−1	8	Qualification to Liga 3
3	Olhanense	6	2	1	3	2	4	−2	7	
4	Praiense	6	1	2	3	4	6	−2	5	

Updated to match(es) played on 30 May 2021. Source: FPF.pt
Rules for classification: 1) Points, 2) Head-to-head points, 3) Head-to-head goal difference, 4) Goal difference, 5) Matches won, 6) Goals scored
(Q) Qualified for the phase indicated

== Final ==
6 June 2021
16:00

Trofense	1-0 (a.e.t.)	Estrela da Amadora
Keffel 96'

Estádio Cidade de Coimbra, Coimbra
Attendance: 0
