= 2016–17 Campeonato de Portugal =

4th season of the Campeonato de Portugal football league

Campeonato de Portugal
- Season: 2016–17
- Promoted: Oliveirense; Real
- Relegated: Caniçal; Torre de Moncorvo; Limianos; Ponte da Barca; Pampilhosa; Académica – SF; Estarreja; Moimenta da Beira; Gafetense; Ginásio de Alcobaça; Vitória de Sernache; Naval 1º de Maio; Fabril do Barreiro; S.C. Viana do Alentejo; Atlético da Malveira; Barreirense; Carapinheirense; Angrense; Mineiro Aljustrelense; Atlético CP; Tourizense; Gouveia

The 2016–17 Campeonato de Portugal (also known as Campeonato de Portugal Prio, for sponsorship reasons) was the fourth season of Portuguese football's renovated third-tier league, since the merging of the Segunda Divisão and Terceira Divisão in 2013, the second season under the current Campeonato de Portugal title, and the 70th season of recognised third-tier football in Portugal. A total of 80 teams compete in this division, which began on 20 August 2016 and ended on 18 June 2017.

== Format ==
The competition format consists of two stages. In the first stage, the 80 clubs were divided in eight series of 10 teams, according to geographic criteria. The only exceptions were teams from Madeira, which were placed in the first series, and teams from the Azores, which were distributed through the latter series. In each series, teams play against each other in a home-and-away double round-robin system.

In the second stage, the two best-placed teams from each first-stage series were divided in two groups of eight teams, again according to geographic proximity, with home-and-away matches. The two group winners secured promotion to the LigaPro. To determine the overall division champion, the group winners contested a one-off grand final on a neutral ground.

On 15 March 2016, the LPFP announced that four teams (instead of three) would be relegated to the 2017–18 Campeonato de Portugal, and two teams (instead of three) would be promoted directly from the Campeonato de Portugal to reduce the number of LigaPro teams to 20 for the 2017–18 season. There would also be a two-legged promotion/relegation play-off involving the 17th- and 18th-placed teams of 2016–17 LigaPro and both second-placed teams of the Campeonato de Portugal promotion groups (North and South).

The remaining eight clubs from each first-stage series were divided into eight groups of eight teams, with home-and-away matches, but there was a reshuffle so that teams from Series A, C, E and G ending the first stage from seventh to tenth were placed in the second stage's Series B, D, F and H and vice versa. Each teams only conserved 25% of first-stage points. The bottom-two teams from each group were relegated to the District Championships. The sixth-placed teams were paired into four two-legged play-out ties, with the four winners being paired into two further two-legged play-out ties. All six play-out losers were also relegated.

== Teams ==
Relegated from the 2015–16 LigaPro:

- Farense
- Mafra
- Atlético CP
- Oriental
- Oliveirense

From the 2015–16 Campeonato de Portugal:

- Bragança
- Vilaverdense
- Marítimo B
- Pedras Salgadas
- Mirandela
- Limianos
- Camacha
- AD Oliveirense
- Torcatense
- São Martinho
- Felgueiras 1932
- Trofense
- Gondomar
- Pedras Rubras
- Salgueiros
- Sousense
- Cinfães
- Amarante
- Coimbrões
- Estarreja
- Anadia
- Sanjoanense
- Cesarense
- Lusitano de Vildemoinhos
- Mortágua
- Gafanha
- Praiense
- Angrense
- Operário
- Sporting Ideal
- Académica – SF
- Pampilhosa
- Tourizense
- AD Nogueirense
- Benfica e Castelo Branco
- União de Leiria
- Alcanenense
- Caldas
- Vitória de Sernache
- Sertanense
- Naval 1º de Maio
- Casa Pia
- 1.º Dezembro
- Sintrense
- Atlético da Malveira
- Loures
- Real
- Torreense
- Sacavenense
- Moura
- Almancilense
- Barreirense
- Lusitano VRSA
- Pinhalnovense
- Louletano

Promoted from the 2015–16 District Championships:

- Algarve FA: Armacenenses
- Aveiro FA: Recreio de Águeda
- Beja FA: Mineiro Aljustrelense
- Braga FA: Merelinense
- Bragança FA: Torre de Moncorvo (Águia de Vimioso declined the promotion)
- Castelo Branco FA: Oleiros (Sporting da Covilhã B declined the promotion)
- Coimbra FA: Carapinheirense
- Évora FA: Sporting de Viana do Alentejo
- Guarda FA: Gouveia
- Leiria FA: Ginásio de Alcobaça
- Lisboa FA: Vilafranquense
- Madeira FA: Caniçal
- Portalegre FA: Gafetense (Mosteirense declined the promotion)
- Porto FA: Aliança de Gandra
- Santarém FA: Fátima
- Setúbal FA: Fabril do Barreiro
- Viana do Castelo FA: Ponte da Barca
- Vila Real FA: Montalegre
- Viseu FA: Moimenta da Beira
- Azores League: Lusitânia

== First stage ==
=== Serie A ===
Pos	Team	Pld	W	D	L	GF	GA	GD	Pts	Qualification	MER	ADO	VIL	BRA	MON	TOR	MIR	PED	LIM	PBA
1	Merelinense	18	14	3	1	39	10	+29	45	Qualification to promotion groups	—	3–1	0–0	3–0	1–0	2–0	2–1	4–1	2–0	5–0
2	AD Oliveirense	18	12	2	4	38	24	+14	38	Qualification to promotion groups	1–3	—	1–0	1–4	2–0	3–0	2–1	4–0	3–1	2–1
3	Vilaverdense	18	12	2	4	38	15	+23	38	Qualification to relegation groups	1–1	1–2	—	4–1	5–1	2–0	0–2	0–1	5–2	2–1
4	Bragança	18	11	1	6	38	29	+9	34	Qualification to relegation groups	2–1	4–3	0–3	—	2–0	2–1	1–1	2–0	6–1	4–0
5	Montalegre	18	5	6	7	23	30	−7	21	Qualification to relegation groups	2–4	4–4	2–1	2–1	—	1–2	1–1	2–1	0–0	2–0
6	Torcatense	18	6	3	9	18	28	−10	21	Qualification to relegation groups	0–2	0–3	1–4	3–1	2–1	—	3–1	2–3	0–0	2–1
7	Mirandela	18	4	6	8	17	24	−7	18	Qualification to relegation groups	1–3	0–0	0–1	1–2	1–1	1–0	—	3–1	1–0	1–0
8	Pedras Salgadas	18	5	2	11	19	32	−13	17	Qualification to relegation groups	0–2	1–2	0–1	2–3	0–0	1–1	2–1	—	0–1	4–2
9	Limianos	18	2	5	11	16	34	−18	11	Qualification to relegation groups	0–0	1–3	1–3	1–2	1–2	0–1	2–2	2–0	—	0–1
10	Ponte da Barca	18	2	4	12	14	34	−20	10	Qualification to relegation groups	0–1	0–1	1–2	2–1	2–2	0–0	0–0	0–2	3–3	—

Source: FPF.pt
Rules for classification: 1) Points, 2) Head-to-head points, 3) Head-to-head goal difference, 4) Goal difference, 5) Matches won, 6) Goals scored

=== Serie B ===
Pos	Team	Pld	W	D	L	GF	GA	GD	Pts	Qualification	AMA	MAR	FEL	ALI	TRO	SMA	CAM	CAN	PED	TMO
1	Amarante	18	12	5	1	33	9	+24	41	Qualification to promotion groups	—	2–0	0–0	1–0	3–0	1–0	1–0	4–1	2–0	5–0
2	Marítimo B	18	10	5	3	29	16	+13	35	Qualification to promotion groups	2–0	—	3–0	1–0	1–1	1–0	1–0	2–1	1–0	8–0
3	Felgueiras 1932	18	10	5	3	30	12	+18	35	Qualification to relegation groups	0–1	1–1	—	2–0	2–0	2–1	3–1	7–1	1–1	4–0
4	Aliança de Gandra	18	10	2	6	30	23	+7	32	Qualification to relegation groups	2–4	2–1	0–2	—	3–0	2–0	5–3	3–1	2–1	4–1
5	Trofense	18	8	5	5	35	21	+14	29	Qualification to relegation groups	0–0	5–0	1–1	4–1	—	3–2	0–0	2–0	1–1	4–0
6	São Martinho	18	7	4	7	25	20	+5	25	Qualification to relegation groups	1–1	2–3	1–0	0–0	4–2	—	2–1	2–0	2–1	5–0
7	Camacha	18	5	4	9	23	23	0	19	Qualification to relegation groups	1–1	0–0	1–2	0–1	2–1	1–2	—	0–1	3–2	5–0
8	Caniçal	18	4	4	10	14	30	−16	16	Qualification to relegation groups	0–0	1–1	0–1	0–2	1–2	1–0	0–0	—	0–1	3–1
9	Pedras Rubras	18	3	6	9	22	26	−4	15	Qualification to relegation groups	2–3	0–0	0–0	1–2	0–4	1–1	1–2	1–1	—	6–1
10	Torre de Moncorvo	18	0	2	16	6	67	−61	2	Qualification to relegation groups	0–4	1–3	0–2	1–1	0–5	0–0	0–3	1–2	0–3	—

Source: FPF.pt
Rules for classification: 1) Points, 2) Head-to-head points, 3) Head-to-head goal difference, 4) Goal difference, 5) Matches won, 6) Goals scored

=== Serie C ===
Pos	Team	Pld	W	D	L	GF	GA	GD	Pts	Qualification	OLI	SAL	SAN	COI	CIN	SOU	GON	EST	CES	MOI
1	Oliveirense	18	10	4	4	26	20	+6	34	Qualification to promotion groups	—	1–0	0–2	2–1	1–0	2–0	5–1	2–5	1–1	2–0
2	Salgueiros	18	10	4	4	25	10	+15	34	Qualification to promotion groups	1–2	—	3–0	2–0	1–0	3–2	0–0	2–2	1–0	3–0
3	Sanjoanense	18	10	2	6	27	22	+5	32	Qualification to relegation groups	0–2	0–0	—	1–1	1–0	2–1	2–1	3–0	3–1	4–2
4	Coimbrões	18	8	6	4	22	20	+2	30	Qualification to relegation groups	0–0	1–0	2–1	—	1–0	2–1	1–1	4–3	2–2	1–0
5	Cinfães	18	8	2	8	16	18	−2	26	Qualification to relegation groups	2–1	0–0	2–1	1–0	—	1–3	2–1	1–1	1–0	0–1
6	Sousense	18	7	3	8	28	29	−1	24	Qualification to relegation groups	1–2	1–0	2–1	2–3	1–2	—	2–1	3–1	1–0	1–1
7	Gondomar	18	5	6	7	21	22	−1	21	Qualification to relegation groups	5–1	1–3	4–0	0–0	1–0	1–1	—	0–3	1–0	0–0
8	Estarreja	18	4	6	8	28	31	−3	18	Qualification to relegation groups	0–0	0–1	1–3	3–1	2–0	1–2	1–3	—	1–2	2–2
9	Cesarense	18	4	5	9	17	22	−5	17	Qualification to relegation groups	1–1	0–1	0–1	1–1	1–2	4–2	1–0	1–1	—	2–1
10	Moimenta da Beira	18	2	6	10	12	28	−16	12	Qualification to relegation groups	0–1	0–4	0–2	0–1	1–2	2–2	0–0	1–1	1–0	—

Source: FPF.pt
Rules for classification: 1) Points, 2) Head-to-head points, 3) Head-to-head goal difference, 4) Goal difference, 5) Matches won, 6) Goals scored

=== Serie D ===
Pos	Team	Pld	W	D	L	GF	GA	GD	Pts	Qualification	GAF	LVI	ANA	MOR	RAG	GOU	TOU	ADN	PAM	AAC
1	Gafanha	18	11	5	2	28	15	+13	38	Qualification to promotion groups	—	1–1	1–2	3–2	1–1	2–1	1–2	4–1	1–0	1–0
2	Lusitano de Vildemoinhos	18	10	4	4	36	20	+16	34	Qualification to promotion groups	2–3	—	0–0	0–2	1–2	2–0	3–2	3–2	2–0	5–0
3	Anadia	18	9	6	3	33	16	+17	33	Qualification to relegation groups	0–1	1–1	—	1–0	6–1	1–1	1–0	3–2	5–1	2–2
4	Mortágua	18	8	7	3	37	18	+19	31	Qualification to relegation groups	0–1	3–2	0–0	—	0–0	3–1	4–2	4–0	2–2	2–0
5	Recreio de Águeda	18	8	4	6	28	24	+4	28	Qualification to relegation groups	0–2	0–0	1–3	2–2	—	1–0	1–0	3–0	1–2	4–2
6	Gouveia	18	6	4	8	23	25	−2	22	Qualification to relegation groups	1–1	0–1	2–1	0–0	0–4	—	3–0	1–0	3–0	4–0
7	Tourizense	18	6	3	9	28	31	−3	21	Qualification to relegation groups	1–1	2–5	2–1	1–1	3–1	3–4	—	0–0	2–0	4–0
8	AD Nogueirense	18	4	7	7	16	25	−9	19	Qualification to relegation groups	0–0	1–3	1–1	1–1	1–0	3–1	2–0	—	1–0	0–0
9	Pampilhosa	18	4	2	12	15	35	−20	14	Qualification to relegation groups	1–3	1–3	0–1	1–4	0–3	3–1	3–2	0–0	—	0–1
10	Académica – SF	18	1	4	13	8	39	−31	7	Qualification to relegation groups	0–1	0–2	0–4	1–3	1–3	0–0	0–2	1–1	0–1	—

Source: FPF.pt
Rules for classification: 1) Points, 2) Head-to-head points, 3) Head-to-head goal difference, 4) Goal difference, 5) Matches won, 6) Goals scored

=== Serie E ===
Pos	Team	Pld	W	D	L	GF	GA	GD	Pts	Qualification	FAT	OPE	LEI	SER	BCB	IDE	OLE	CAR	VSE	NAV
1	Fátima	18	13	2	3	42	19	+23	41	Qualification to promotion groups	—	1–0	1–0	2–1	1–0	5–1	3–2	2–0	2–2	8–0
2	Operário	18	11	2	5	38	18	+20	35	Qualification to promotion groups	1–3	—	0–1	0–1	2–2	2–1	3–0	7–1	3–0	4–1
3	União de Leiria	18	11	2	5	32	12	+20	35	Qualification to relegation groups	0–3	0–1	—	2–3	1–1	1–0	3–0	2–0	1–0	6–0
4	Sertanense	18	10	3	5	28	15	+13	33	Qualification to relegation groups	0–1	1–3	1–1	—	0–0	5–1	2–1	3–0	2–0	3–0
5	Benfica e Castelo Branco	18	9	5	4	39	16	+23	32	Qualification to relegation groups	2–1	1–2	1–2	0–1	—	4–0	1–0	3–0	5–2	5–0
6	Sporting Ideal	18	10	2	6	31	25	+6	32	Qualification to relegation groups	3–1	1–0	0–1	1–0	1–1	—	1–1	4–1	3–1	5–1
7	Oleiros	18	3	6	9	20	33	−13	15	Qualification to relegation groups	0–2	1–1	0–4	0–1	0–0	0–1	—	2–1	2–1	5–3
8	Carapinheirense	18	4	3	11	22	37	−15	15	Qualification to relegation groups	4–0	1–2	1–0	1–1	0–3	0–3	2–2	—	0–2	5–0
9	Vitória de Sernache	18	3	5	10	18	31	−13	14	Qualification to relegation groups	2–2	1–2	0–1	1–0	0–1	1–2	1–1	1–1	—	2–0
10	Naval 1º de Maio	18	0	2	16	15	79	−64	2	Qualification to relegation groups	1–4	1–5	0–6	1–3	3–7	0–3	3–3	0–4	1–1	—

Source: FPF.pt
Rules for classification: 1) Points, 2) Head–to–head points, 3) Head–to–head goal difference, 4) Goal difference, 5) Matches won, 6) Goals scored

=== Serie F ===
Pos	Team	Pld	W	D	L	GF	GA	GD	Pts	Qualification	PRA	TOR	MAF	ALC	CAL	VIL	GAF	LUS	ANG	GAL
1	Praiense	18	12	6	0	29	11	+18	42	Qualification to promotion groups	—	0–0	2–1	3–2	2–1	3–1	1–0	2–0	2–0	3–1
2	Torreense	18	12	4	2	26	9	+17	40	Qualification to promotion groups	0–0	—	1–0	2–1	1–0	1–1	3–0	2–0	4–1	2–0
3	Mafra	18	12	3	3	35	9	+26	39	Qualification to relegation groups	0–0	3–0	—	2–1	2–1	1–1	3–0	3–0	3–0	4–0
4	Alcanenense	18	8	5	5	29	18	+11	29	Qualification to relegation groups	0–0	2–1	1–2	—	0–0	0–0	4–1	4–2	0–0	2–0
5	Caldas	18	8	3	7	22	15	+7	27	Qualification to relegation groups	1–1	0–2	0–1	2–0	—	2–1	3–1	3–0	2–0	2–0
6	Vilafranquense	18	5	7	6	19	16	+3	22	Qualification to relegation groups	0–2	0–1	0–0	1–1	0–0	—	1–0	4–2	2–0	4–0
7	Gafetense	18	6	1	11	17	32	−15	19	Qualification to relegation groups	2–4	0–1	1–0	0–1	2–1	1–0	—	1–3	2–1	3–1
8	Lusitânia	18	5	3	10	18	30	−12	18	Qualification to relegation groups	0–1	1–1	0–3	0–3	1–0	0–0	3–0	—	3–1	0–0
9	Angrense	18	2	2	14	12	36	−24	8	Qualification to relegation groups	1–2	0–2	0–3	0–3	0–1	2–1	1–1	1–3	—	1–2
10	Ginásio de Alcobaça	18	2	2	14	11	42	−31	8	Qualification to relegation groups	1–1	0–2	1–4	2–4	1–3	0–2	1–2	1–0	0–3	—

Source: FPF.pt
Rules for classification: 1) Points, 2) Head–to–head points, 3) Head–to–head goal difference, 4) Goal difference, 5) Matches won, 6) Goals scored

=== Serie G ===
Pos	Team	Pld	W	D	L	GF	GA	GD	Pts	Qualification	SAC	REA	SIN	CPI	LOU	ORI	DEZ	BAR	MAL	ACP
1	Sacavenense	18	12	4	2	26	6	+20	40	Qualification to promotion groups	—	0–1	2–1	1–0	2–0	0–0	3–1	1–0	3–0	5–0
2	Real	18	12	3	3	25	10	+15	39	Qualification to promotion groups	2–1	—	1–0	2–0	1–2	1–0	1–1	0–2	1–1	3–0
3	Sintrense	18	12	2	4	35	16	+19	38	Qualification to relegation groups	0–1	0–2	—	1–1	1–0	2–1	1–0	3–1	5–1	6–0
4	Casa Pia	18	9	5	4	32	13	+19	32	Qualification to relegation groups	0–1	0–0	2–2	—	3–0	2–1	3–2	0–0	5–0	8–0
5	Loures	18	9	4	5	17	14	+3	31	Qualification to relegation groups	1–1	0–1	0–1	1–0	—	2–1	1–0	1–1	1–0	1–0
6	Oriental	18	6	6	6	26	17	+9	24	Qualification to relegation groups	0–0	3–2	0–2	0–2	1–1	—	0–0	1–0	1–1	6–1
7	1º de Dezembro	18	6	5	7	16	15	+1	23	Qualification to relegation groups	0–0	0–1	0–1	1–1	0–2	0–0	—	1–0	2–0	1–0
8	Barreirense	18	2	6	10	12	21	−9	12	Qualification to relegation groups	0–3	0–1	1–3	0–1	0–0	0–1	0–1	—	2–2	3–0
9	Atlético da Malveira	18	1	5	12	16	38	−22	8	Qualification to relegation groups	0–1	0–1	2–3	1–2	1–2	1–2	1–3	1–1	—	3–2
10	Atlético CP	18	0	2	16	6	61	−55	2	Qualification to relegation groups	0–1	0–4	1–3	0–2	0–2	0–8	0–3	1–1	1–1	—

Source: FPF.pt
Rules for classification: 1) Points, 2) Head–to–head points, 3) Head–to–head goal difference, 4) Goal difference, 5) Matches won, 6) Goals scored

=== Serie H ===
Pos	Team	Pld	W	D	L	GF	GA	GD	Pts	Qualification	FAR	LOU	LUS	MOU	PIN	ALM	ALJ	ARM	SVA	FAB
1	Farense	18	12	3	3	31	7	+24	39	Qualification to promotion groups	—	1–0	1–1	1–0	0–1	0–1	2–0	1–0	5–0	1–0
2	Louletano	18	11	5	2	31	16	+15	38	Qualification to promotion groups	1–1	—	4–2	1–0	1–1	2–0	1–0	2–1	2–1	1–1
3	Lusitano VRSA	18	9	4	5	31	23	+8	31	Qualification to relegation groups	0–3	0–1	—	2–2	2–0	4–3	4–0	2–0	1–0	1–0
4	Moura	18	7	6	5	20	18	+2	27	Qualification to relegation groups	0–0	1–2	1–2	—	0–0	1–0	2–1	0–1	1–1	3–2
5	Pinhalnovense	18	7	6	5	21	20	+1	27	Qualification to relegation groups	1–0	1–0	2–5	0–0	—	1–1	1–1	1–0	1–2	2–3
6	Almancilense	18	6	3	9	25	29	−4	21	Qualification to relegation groups	1–6	2–3	1–0	0–1	1–2	—	3–1	0–1	3–0	2–2
7	Mineiro Aljustrelense	18	5	6	7	23	30	−7	21	Qualification to relegation groups	0–1	2–2	1–0	2–3	1–0	1–1	—	5–2	1–1	2–2
8	Armacenenses	18	4	2	12	20	34	−14	14	Qualification to relegation groups	0–2	0–3	0–1	1–2	1–3	1–3	4–4	—	1–1	4–0
9	Sporting de Viana do Alentejo	18	2	8	8	24	36	−12	14	Qualification to relegation groups	1–4	1–1	3–3	1–1	2–2	1–2	1–2	0–2	—	7–3
10	Fabril do Barreiro	18	3	5	10	22	38	−16	14	Qualification to relegation groups	0–2	1–4	1–1	1–2	0–1	2–1	0–2	3–1	1–1	—

Source: FPF.pt
Rules for classification: 1) Points, 2) Head–to–head points, 3) Head–to–head goal difference, 4) Goal difference, 5) Matches won, 6) Goals scored

== Second stage ==
=== Promotion groups ===
==== North zone ====
Pos	Team	Pld	W	D	L	GF	GA	GD	Pts	Promotion or qualification	OLI	MER	SAL	MAR	LVI	AMA	ADO	GAF
1	Oliveirense (P)	14	8	3	3	15	9	+6	27	Promotion to 2017–18 LigaPro	—	2–1	0–1	1–0	2–0	2–1	3–1	1–0
2	Merelinense	14	7	4	3	21	14	+7	25	Qualification to promotion play-off	1–0	—	2–0	3–2	2–1	1–1	1–1	2–1
3	Salgueiros	14	7	4	3	16	10	+6	25		1–1	1–0	—	0–1	2–0	2–2	3–2	0–0
4	Marítimo B	14	7	1	6	20	15	+5	22		1–1	0–2	2–1	—	0–1	2–1	5–1	2–0
5	Lusitano de Vildemoinhos	14	5	3	6	13	13	0	18		0–0	2–2	0–1	1–0	—	3–0	3–0	2–1
6	Amarante	14	4	5	5	18	17	+1	17		0–1	1–1	0–0	2–0	2–0	—	1–2	1–1
7	AD Oliveirense	14	3	2	9	17	32	−15	11		0–1	1–3	0–3	1–3	0–0	1–3	—	3–2
8	Gafanha	14	3	2	9	11	21	−10	11		2–0	1–0	0–1	0–2	1–0	1–3	1–4	—

Source: [[[Category:All articles with unsourced statements]]
Rules for classification: 1) Points, 2) Head-to-head points, 3) Head-to-head goal difference, 4) Goal difference, 5) Matches won, 6) Goals scored
(P) Promoted

==== South zone ====
Pos	Team	Pld	W	D	L	GF	GA	GD	Pts	Promotion or qualification	REA	PRA	FAR	FAT	SAC	TOR	LOU	OPE
1	Real (P)	14	7	4	3	18	11	+7	25	Promotion to 2017–18 LigaPro	—	1–1	1–0	0–1	2–1	0–0	2–0	1–0
2	Praiense	14	7	3	4	16	14	+2	24	Qualification to promotion play-off	2–1	—	2–2	0–1	1–0	1–0	1–0	2–0
3	Farense	14	6	5	3	23	15	+8	23		2–1	3–1	—	3–1	0–0	0–1	2–1	4–1
4	Fátima	14	7	2	5	19	16	+3	23		1–2	2–1	0–2	—	2–1	2–3	1–1	2–0
5	Sacavenense	14	4	5	5	13	12	+1	17		0–2	3–0	2–1	2–0	—	2–0	1–1	1–1
6	Torreense	14	4	4	6	13	14	−1	16		0–2	1–2	1–1	0–0	2–0	—	3–0	0–0
7	Louletano	14	2	6	6	13	20	−7	12		2–2	0–2	2–2	1–2	0–0	3–2	—	2–0
8	Operário	14	1	7	6	5	18	−13	10		1–1	0–0	1–1	0–4	0–0	1–0	0–0	—

Rules for classification: 1) Points, 2) Head-to-head points, 3) Head-to-head goal difference, 4) Goal difference, 5) Matches won, 6) Goals scored
(P) Promoted

=== Promotion play-off ===
27 May 2017
17:00 WEST (UTC+01:00)

Académico de Viseu	2–0	Merelinense
Lima 41'; Stéphane 71'	Report

Estádio do Fontelo, Viseu
Attendance: 3,100
Referee: Fábio Veríssimo
3 June 2017
17:00 WEST (UTC+01:00)

Merelinense	0–1	Académico de Viseu
	Report	Bura 78'

Estádio João Soares Vieira, São Pedro de Merelim
Attendance: 2,000
Referee: Bruno Paixão

Académico de Viseu won 3–0 on aggregate.

27 May 2017
17:00 WEST (UTC+01:00)

Praiense	0–1	Leixões
	Report	Salvador 84'

Estádio Municipal da Praia da Vitória, Praia da Vitória, Azores
Attendance: 600
Referee: Tiago Martins
3 June 2017
15:00 WEST (UTC+01:00)

Leixões	1–1	Praiense
Lamas 70'	Report	Arruda 29'

Estádio do Mar, Matosinhos
Attendance: 6,000
Referee: Nuno Almeida

Leixões won 2–1 on aggregate.

=== Final ===
4 June 2017
15:00 WEST (UTC+01:00)

Oliveirense	0 – 2	Real

Estádio do Fontelo, Viseu

=== Relegation groups ===
==== Serie A ====
Pos	Team	Pld	W	D	L	GF	GA	GD	Pts	Qualification or relegation	VIL	MON	CAM	PED	TOR	BRA	CAN	TMO
1	Vilaverdense	14	10	1	3	32	10	+22	41		—	3–0	4–0	3–1	2–0	1–0	3–0	6–0
2	Montalegre	14	9	1	4	27	16	+11	34		2–1	—	1–0	3–1	2–2	2–1	3–1	7–0
3	Camacha	14	6	5	3	24	13	+11	28		1–2	1–0	—	0–0	2–1	1–1	5–0	4–0
4	Pedras Rubras	14	7	3	4	28	17	+11	28		3–1	1–0	2–2	—	2–1	3–3	1–2	8–0
5	Torcatense	14	7	2	5	28	15	+13	29		1–0	1–2	2–2	1–0	—	1–0	3–0	9–0
6	Bragança (Q)	14	5	2	7	25	17	+8	26	Qualification to relegation play-out	1–2	3–1	0–2	0–1	1–0	—	3–1	3–0
7	Caniçal (R)	14	4	2	8	15	27	−12	18	Relegation to District Championships	1–1	1–2	0–0	0–2	2–3	2–1	—	3–0
8	Torre de Moncorvo (R)	14	0	0	14	1	65	−64	1	Relegation to District Championships	0–3	0–2	0–4	1–3	0–3	0–8	0–2	—

Source: FPF.pt
Rules for classification: 1) Points, 2) Head-to-head points, 3) Head-to-head goal difference, 4) Goal difference, 5) Matches won, 6) Goals scored
(Q) Qualified for the phase indicated; (R) Relegated

==== Serie B ====
Pos	Team	Pld	W	D	L	GF	GA	GD	Pts	Qualification or relegation	FEL	SMA	ALI	PED	TRO	MIR	LIM	PBA
1	Felgueiras 1932	14	8	4	2	16	10	+6	37		—	1–0	1–1	0–3	2–1	1–1	2–0	1–0
2	São Martinho	14	8	3	3	32	13	+19	34		0–2	—	6–1	1–0	1–0	5–0	1–1	2–1
3	Aliança de Gandra	14	7	3	4	18	21	−3	32		0–1	0–6	—	0–0	1–0	1–1	2–1	3–1
4	Pedras Salgadas	14	6	3	5	23	17	+6	26		2–1	1–4	0–1	—	3–1	1–1	2–0	5–2
5	Trofense	14	5	2	7	18	18	0	25		1–2	1–2	3–0	1–0	—	0–0	2–1	3–1
6	Mirandela (Q)	14	3	9	2	17	19	−2	23	Qualification to relegation play-out	1–1	1–1	0–2	3–2	3–3	—	2–0	1–1
7	Limianos (R)	14	3	4	7	13	20	−7	16	Relegation to District Championships	0–0	2–2	1–2	2–2	1–0	0–2	—	2–0
8	Ponte da Barca (R)	14	1	2	11	11	30	−19	8	Relegation to District Championships	0–1	2–1	0–4	0–2	1–2	1–1	1–2	—

Source: FPF.pt
Rules for classification: 1) Points, 2) Head-to-head points, 3) Head-to-head goal difference, 4) Goal difference, 5) Matches won, 6) Goals scored
(Q) Qualified for the phase indicated; (R) Relegated

==== Serie C ====
Pos	Team	Pld	W	D	L	GF	GA	GD	Pts	Qualification or relegation	SAN	CIN	ADN	COI	SOU	TOU	PAM	AAC
1	Sanjoanense	14	9	2	3	23	13	+10	37		—	2–0	1–2	1–0	1–0	2–1	1–1	3–2
2	Cinfães	14	7	4	3	16	15	+1	32		1–3	—	1–0	2–2	2–0	2–2	1–0	1–0
3	AD Nogueirense	14	6	3	5	14	12	+2	26		1–0	0–0	—	3–1	1–0	1–1	1–0	0–1
4	Coimbrões	14	5	2	7	20	19	+1	25		0–0	1–2	4–3	—	1–4	2–0	4–0	2–1
5	Sousense	14	5	3	6	17	18	−1	24		2–1	1–1	1–0	1–0	—	1–2	0–0	1–1
6	Tourizense (Q)	14	5	3	6	21	22	−1	24	Qualification to relegation play-out	1–3	3–0	1–2	0–3	3–1	—	3–1	1–0
7	Pampilhosa (R)	14	5	2	7	13	21	−8	21	Relegation to District Championships	1–3	0–1	1–0	1–0	3–2	2–1	—	3–2
8	Académica – SF (R)	14	3	3	8	16	20	−4	14	Relegation to District Championships	1–2	1–2	0–0	1–0	2–3	2–2	2–0	—

Source: FPF.pt
Rules for classification: 1) Points, 2) Head-to-head points, 3) Head-to-head goal difference, 4) Goal difference, 5) Matches won, 6) Goals scored
(Q) Qualified for the phase indicated; (R) Relegated

==== Serie D ====
Pos	Team	Pld	W	D	L	GF	GA	GD	Pts	Qualification or relegation	ANA	RAG	GON	CES	MOR	GOU	EST	MOI
1	Anadia	14	9	3	2	25	14	+11	39		—							
2	Recreio de Águeda	14	6	3	5	21	14	+7	28			—						
3	Gondomar	14	6	5	3	19	14	+5	29				—					
4	Cesarense	14	6	4	4	24	22	+2	27					—				
5	Mortágua	14	4	5	5	20	22	−2	25						—			
6	Gouveia (Q)	14	4	3	7	14	27	−13	21	Qualification to relegation play-out						—		
7	Estarreja (R)	14	4	3	7	19	23	−4	20	Relegation to District Championships							—	
8	Moimenta da Beira (R)	14	3	2	9	15	21	−6	14	Relegation to District Championships								—

Source: FPF.pt,
Rules for classification: 1) Points, 2) Head-to-head points, 3) Head-to-head goal difference, 4) Goal difference, 5) Matches won, 6) Goals scored
(Q) Qualified for the phase indicated; (R) Relegated

==== Serie E ====
Pos	Team	Pld	W	D	L	GF	GA	GD	Pts	Qualification or relegation	LEI	BCB	IDE	LUS	SER	ANG	GAF	GAL
1	União de Leiria	14	11	3	0	24	7	+17	45		—							
2	Benfica e Castelo Branco	14	6	5	3	27	18	+9	31			—						
3	Sporting Ideal	14	6	3	5	24	25	−1	29				—					
4	Lusitânia	14	5	6	3	20	12	+8	25					—				
5	Sertanense	14	4	6	4	15	12	+3	27						—			
6	Angrense (Q)	14	7	2	5	24	15	+9	25	Qualification to relegation play-out						—		
7	Gafetense (R)	14	1	2	11	9	29	−20	10	Relegation to District Championships							—	
8	Ginásio de Alcobaça (R)	14	2	1	11	11	33	−22	9	Relegation to District Championships								—

Source: FPF.pt
Rules for classification: 1) Points, 2) Head-to-head points, 3) Head-to-head goal difference, 4) Goal difference, 5) Matches won, 6) Goals scored
(Q) Qualified for the phase indicated; (R) Relegated

==== Serie F ====
Pos	Team	Pld	W	D	L	GF	GA	GD	Pts	Qualification or relegation	MAF	CAL	ALC	VIL	OLE	CAR	VSE	NAV
1	Mafra	14	9	3	2	39	9	+30	40		—							
2	Caldas	14	7	3	4	20	13	+7	31			—						
3	Alcanenense	14	7	3	4	26	12	+14	31				—					
4	Vilafranquense	14	5	5	4	21	13	+8	26					—				
5	Oleiros	14	6	3	5	17	18	−1	25						—			
6	Carapinheirense (Q)	14	4	7	3	19	12	+7	23	Qualification to relegation play-out						—		
7	Vitória de Sernache (R)	14	3	4	7	15	24	−9	17	Relegation to District Championships							—	
8	Naval 1º de Maio (R)	14	1	0	13	9	65	−56	4	Relegation to District Championships								—

Source: FPF.pt
Rules for classification: 1) Points, 2) Head-to-head points, 3) Head-to-head goal difference, 4) Goal difference, 5) Matches won, 6) Goals scored
(Q) Qualified for the phase indicated; (R) Relegated

==== Serie G ====
Pos	Team	Pld	W	D	L	GF	GA	GD	Pts	Qualification or relegation	LOU	CPI	SIN	ORI	ARM	ALJ	FAB	SVA
1	Loures	14	8	4	2	30	13	+17	36		—							
2	Casa Pia	14	7	5	2	36	19	+17	34			—						
3	Sintrense	14	6	6	2	14	11	+3	34				—					
4	Oriental	14	7	4	3	31	15	+16	31					—				
5	Armacenenses	14	7	2	5	24	22	+2	27						—			
6	Mineiro Aljustrelense (Q)	14	3	5	6	16	26	−10	20	Qualification to relegation play-out						—		
7	Fabril do Barreiro (R)	14	2	4	8	20	32	−12	14	Relegation to District Championships							—	
8	Sporting de Viana do Alentejo (R)	14	0	2	12	12	45	−33	6	Relegation to District Championships								—

Source: FPF.pt
Rules for classification: 1) Points, 2) Head-to-head points, 3) Head-to-head goal difference, 4) Goal difference, 5) Matches won, 6) Goals scored
(Q) Qualified for the phase indicated; (R) Relegated

==== Serie H ====
Pos	Team	Pld	W	D	L	GF	GA	GD	Pts	Qualification or relegation	LUS	MOU	PIN	DEZ	ALM	ACP	MAL	BAR
1	Lusitano VRSA	14	5	4	5	15	19	−4	27		—							
2	Moura	14	4	8	2	13	9	+4	27			—						
3	Pinhalnovense	14	4	6	4	20	17	+3	25				—					
4	1º de Dezembro	14	4	6	4	20	19	+1	24					—				
5	Almancilense	14	4	6	4	16	16	0	24						—			
6	Atlético CP (Q)	14	6	3	5	21	20	+1	22	Qualification to relegation play-out						—		
7	Atlético da Malveira (R)	14	5	3	6	18	20	−2	20	Relegation to District Championships							—	
8	Barreirense (R)	14	3	6	5	18	21	−3	18	Relegation to District Championships								—

Source: FPF.pt
Rules for classification: 1) Points, 2) Head-to-head points, 3) Head-to-head goal difference, 4) Goal difference, 5) Matches won, 6) Goals scored
(Q) Qualified for the phase indicated; (R) Relegated

=== Relegation play-out ===
==== First round ====
28 May 2017
17:00 WEST (UTC+01:00)

Carapinheirense	0–0	Mirandela

Complexo Desportivo de São Pedro, Carapinheira
4 June 2017
17:00 WEST (UTC+01:00)

Mirandela	2–0	Carapinheirense

Estádio de São Sebastião, Mirandela

Carapinheirense lost 2–0 on aggregate and were relegated.

28 May 2017
16:00 WEST (UTC+01:00)

Angrense	1–0	Bragança

Estádio Municipal de Angra do Heroísmo, Angra do Heroísmo, Azores
4 June 2017
17:00 WEST (UTC+01:00)

Bragança	3–1	Angrense

Estádio Municipal Eng. José Luís Pinheiro, Bragança

Angrense lost 3–2 on aggregate and were relegated.

28 May 2017
17:00 WEST (UTC+01:00)

Tourizense	2–0	Mineiro Aljustrelense

Estádio Visconde do Vinhal, Touriz (Tábua)
4 June 2017
17:00 WEST (UTC+01:00)

Mineiro Aljustrelense	1–0	Tourizense

Estádio Municipal de Aljustrel, Aljustrel

Mineiro Aljustrelense lost 2–1 on aggregate and were relegated.

27 May 2017
17:00 WEST (UTC+01:00)

Gouveia	1–0	Atlético CP

Estádio Municipal do Farvão, Gouveia
4 June 2017
17:00 WEST (UTC+01:00)

Atlético CP	0–0	Gouveia

Estádio Francisco Lázaro, Lisbon

Atlético CP lost 1–0 on aggregate and were relegated.

==== Second round ====
11 June 2017
17:00 WEST (UTC+01:00)

Tourizense	2–0	Mirandela

Estádio Visconde do Vinhal, Touriz (Tábua)
18 June 2017
17:00 WEST (UTC+01:00)

Mirandela	2–0 (a.e.t.)	Tourizense
Penalties
	5–4

Estádio de São Sebastião, Mirandela

2–2 on aggregate. Tourizense lost 5–4 on penalties and were relegated.

11 June 2017
17:00 WEST (UTC+01:00)

Bragança	5–0	Gouveia

Estádio Municipal Eng. José Luís Pinheiro, Bragança
18 June 2017
17:00 WEST (UTC+01:00)

Gouveia	2–1	Bragança

Estádio Municipal do Farvão, Gouveia

Gouveia lost 6–2 on aggregate and were relegated.
