= C.D. Carapinheirense =

Portuguese football club

- Full name: Clube Desportivo Carapinheirense
- Founded: 1959; 67 years ago
- Ground: Complexo Desportivo São Pedro, Carapinheira
- Capacity: 2500
- League: District league
- 2020–21 CdP: 9th, Serie E (relegated)

Clube Desportivo Carapinheirense is a Portuguese sports club from Carapinheira.

The men's football team plays in the AF Coimbra league. The team played in the Campeonato de Portugal, then the third tier of Portuguese football, in the 2013–14, 2016–17 and 2020–21 seasons. The team also contested the Taça de Portugal in those seasons.
