= 2016–17 Liga Meo Azores =

Liga Meo Azores
- Season: 2016–17
- Promoted: Sp. Guadalupe
- Relegated: Barreiro; Os Marítimos; Cedrens

The 2016–17 Liga Meo Azores was the fourth edition of the Liga Meo Azores, the highest level football competition for non-professional teams in the Azores and the fifth level of the Portuguese football league system. In total, 10 teams from five of the nine islands took part in the competition.

The league began with the first round of matches in the regular phase on 1 October 2016 and concluded with the final round of matches in the championship and relegation phases on 14 May 2017.

Sporting Guadalupe won the league for the first time and were promoted to the Campeonato de Portugal.

== Background ==
The Liga Meo Azores was first played in the 2013–14 season. The inaugural champions were Angrense. No team had won the league more than once since its inception. Sporting Ideal won the league in its second season and Rabo de Peixe were the defending champions after winning the 2015–16 edition.

== Format ==
The league began with a double round robin regular phase in which each of the 10 teams played every other team once at home and once away for a total of 18 matches. After the regular phase was completed, the league was split into a championship round for the top five teams in the regular phase and a relegation round for the bottom five teams. Both the championship and relegation rounds were played as double round robins where each team played the four other teams in their section a further once at home and once away for a total of eight games. Points gained in the regular phase counted towards the standings in the championship and relegation rounds. The league began on 1 October 2016 and concluded on 14 May 2017.

== Teams ==
Region	Team/s
São Miguel Island	Rabo Peixe; São Roque; União Micaelense
Terceira Island	Barreiro; SC Vilanovense; Os Maritimos
Graciosa Island	Sp. Guadalupe; Marítimo Graciosa
Pico Island	Prainha FC
Faial Island	Cedrense

== Standings ==
=== Regular phase ===
Team	Pld	W	D	L	GF	GA	GD	Pts	Qualification or relegation
Sp. Guadalupe	18	12	4	2	41	19	+22	40	Championship Zone
Rabo de Peixe	18	12	3	3	42	18	+24	39	Championship Zone
Prainha FC	18	10	5	3	27	14	+13	35	Championship Zone
SC Vilanovense	18	8	6	4	32	19	+13	30	Championship Zone
Marítimo Graciosa	18	7	4	7	20	17	+3	25	Championship Zone
Uniao Micaelense	18	7	3	8	25	22	+3	24	Relegation Zone
Sao Roque	18	6	6	6	23	21	+2	24	Relegation Zone
Barreiro	18	3	5	10	19	30	−11	14	Relegation Zone
Os Marítimos	18	4	2	12	13	26	−13	14	Relegation Zone
Cedrense	18	1	2	15	8	64	−56	5	Relegation Zone

=== Championship zone ===
Team	Pld	W	D	L	GF	GA	GD	BP	Pts	Qualification
Sp. Guadalupe	8	7	0	1	18	6	+12	40	61	Champion
Rabo de Peixe	8	6	0	2	17	8	+9	39	57	
Prainha FC	8	2	1	5	5	11	−6	35	42	
SC Vilanovense	8	1	1	6	3	11	−8	30	34	
Marítimo Graciosa	8	2	2	4	7	14	−7	25	33	

=== Relegation Zone ===
Team	Pld	W	D	L	GF	GA	GD	BP	Pts	Relegation
Uniao Micaelense	8	6	1	1	23	5	+18	24	43	
Sao Roque	8	6	1	1	10	4	+6	24	43	
Barreiro	8	4	1	3	16	11	+5	14	27	Relegation
Os Marítimos	8	2	1	5	10	18	−8	14	21	Relegation
Cedrense	8	0	0	8	4	25	−21	5	5	Relegation
