= C.A. Macedo de Cavaleiros =

Portuguese football club

Macedo de Cavaleiros
- Full name: Clube Atlético de Macedo de Cavaleiros
- Founded: 1954
- Ground: Municipal de Macedo de Cavaleiros; Macedo de Cavaleiros; Portugal
- Capacity: 2,500
- Chairman: Manuel Rodrigues
- League: Segunda Divisão Série Norte
Home colours

Clube Atlético de Macedo de Cavaleiros (abbreviated as CA Macedo de Cavaleiros) is a Portuguese football club based in Macedo de Cavaleiros in the district of Bragança.

== Background ==
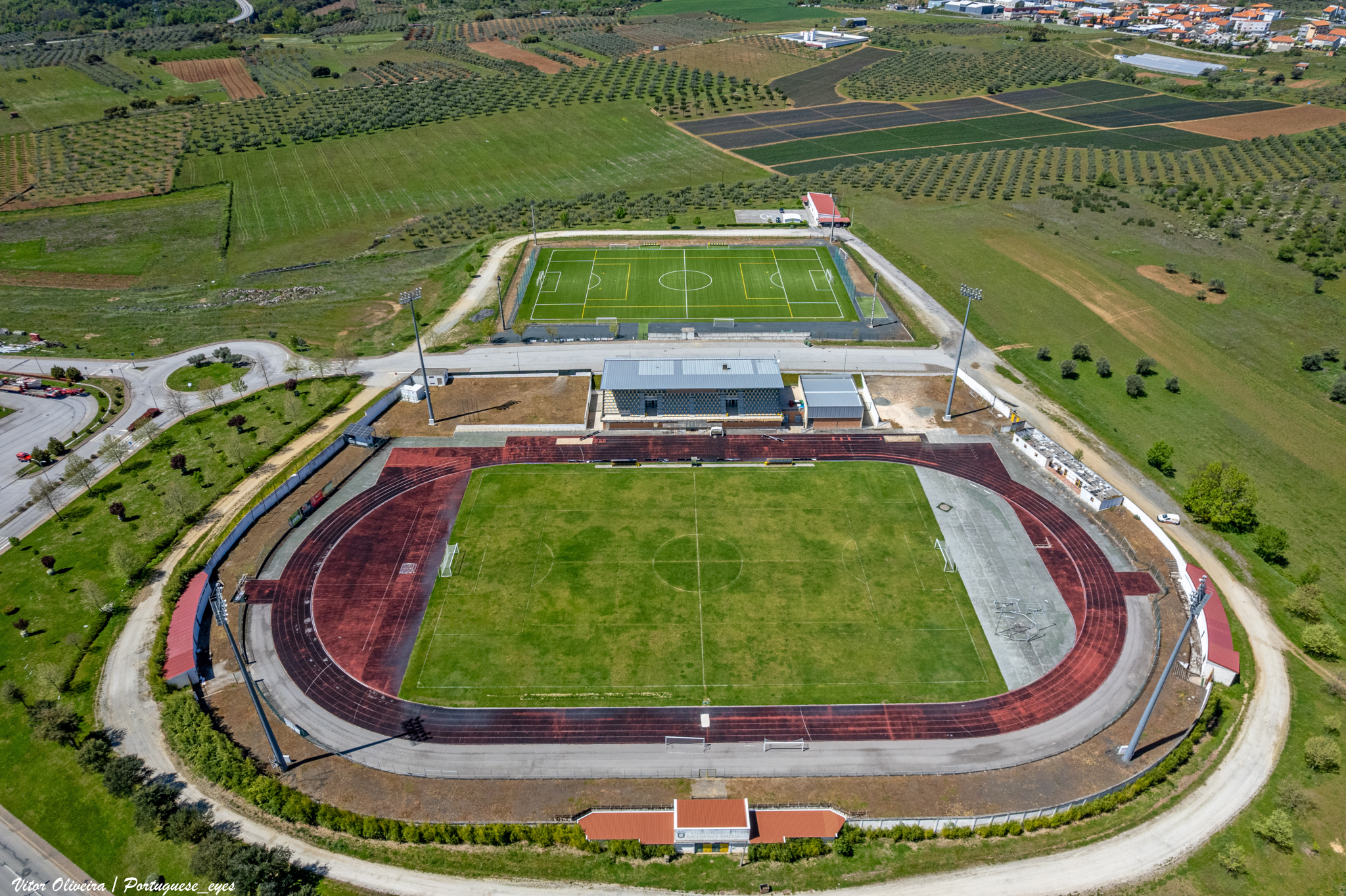
Stadium

CA Macedo de Cavaleiros currently plays in the Segunda Divisão Série Norte, which is the third tier of Portuguese football. The club was founded in 1954 and they play their home matches at the Municipal de Macedo de Cavaleiros in Macedo de Cavaleiros. The stadium is able to accommodate 2,500 spectators and was constructed in 2008.

The club is affiliated to Associação de Futebol de Bragança and has competed in the AF Bragança Taça. The club has also entered the national cup competition known as Taça de Portugal on many occasions.

== Season to season ==
Season	Level	Division	Section	Place	Movements
1990–91	Tier 4	Terceira Divisão	Série A	13th	
1991–92	Tier 4	Terceira Divisão	Série A	15th	Relegated
1992–93	Tier 5	Distritais	AF Bragança – 1ª Divisão		Promoted
1993–94	Tier 4	Terceira Divisão	Série A	15th	Relegated
1994–95	Tier 5	Distritais	AF Bragança – 1ª Divisão		
1995–96	Tier 5	Distritais	AF Bragança – 1ª Divisão		Promoted
1996–97	Tier 4	Terceira Divisão	Série A	7th	
1997–98	Tier 4	Terceira Divisão	Série A	14th	
1998–99	Tier 4	Terceira Divisão	Série A	6th	
1999–2000	Tier 4	Terceira Divisão	Série A	15th	Relegated
2000–01	Tier 5	Distritais	AF Bragança – 1ª Divisão		Promoted
2001–02	Tier 4	Terceira Divisão	Série A	15th	Relegated
2002–03	Tier 5	Distritais	AF Bragança – Honra	4th	
2003–04	Tier 5	Distritais	AF Bragança – Honra	3rd	
2004–05	Tier 5	Distritais	AF Bragança – Honra	2nd	
2005–06	Tier 5	Distritais	AF Bragança – Honra	1st	Promoted
2006–07	Tier 4	Terceira Divisão	Série A	10th	
2007–08	Tier 4	Terceira Divisão	Série A – 1ª Fase	8th	Relegation Group
	Tier 4	Terceira Divisão	Série A – Sub-Série A2	1st	
2008–09	Tier 4	Terceira Divisão	Série A – 1ª Fase	7th	Relegation Group
	Tier 4	Terceira Divisão	Série A – Sub-Série A1	1st	
2009–10	Tier 4	Terceira Divisão	Série A – 1ª Fase	1st	Promotion Group
	Tier 4	Terceira Divisão	Série A Fase Final	1st	Promoted
2010–11	Tier 3	Segunda Divisão	Série Norte	8th	
2011–12	Tier 3	Segunda Divisão	Série Norte	10th	

== Current Squad ==
As of 16 February 2026

Note: Flags indicate national team as defined under FIFA eligibility rules; some limited exceptions apply. Players may hold more than one non-FIFA nationality.

No.	Pos.	Nation	Player
1	GK	BRA	Bruno Silva
2	DF	COL	Edison Carmona
3	DF	POR	Gonçalo Martins
4	DF	POR	Nélson Edra
6	DF	BRA	Luiz Pessanha
7	MF	POR	Santiago Godinho
8	MF	POR	Tomás Maçaira
9	FW	BRA	Guilherme Schiavo
10	MF	NGA	Mustapha Olajide
11	FW	POR	Tomás Sousa
11	FW	BRA	Thiago Gomes
12	GK	BRA	Caio Rosa
14	FW	BRA	Henrique Almeida
15	DF	POR	Clemente
16	MF	POR	Martim Brás
16	MF	SWE	Mattias Davis
17	MF	BRA	Manu Fernandes

No.	Pos.	Nation	Player
18	DF	POR	Santiago Fragoso
19	FW	POR	Martim Frutuoso
20	MF	POR	Diogo Tomé
20	DF	STP	Luís Roberto
21	MF	POR	Léo Cruz
24	DF	POR	João Caravana
25	DF	POR	Afonso Ribeiro
28	GK	POR	Diogo Tomé
44	MF	POR	Afonso Martins
44	FW	NGA	Félix Félix
45	FW	NGA	John Alasiri
55	MF	BRA	Rafael Kenji
66	DF	ESP	David Pérez
77	DF	POR	Edu Reis
87	MF	POR	Gabriel Alves
88	MF	BRA	Luccas Lameirão
99	FW	BRA	Diego Oliveira

== Honours ==
- Portuguese Third Division (1): 2009/10
- AF Bragança Divisão Honra (12): 1969/70, 1976/77, 1977/78, 1978/79, 1979/80, 1981/82, 1983/84, 1992/93, 1995/96, 2000/01, 2005/06, 2020/21
- AF Bragança Taça (6): 1999/00, 2000/01, 2002/03, 2003/04, 2004/05, 2005/06
