= SC Mirandela =

Portuguese association football club

Mirandela
- Full name: Sport Clube de Mirandela
- Nicknames: alvi-negros (white and blacks)
- Founded: 1926
- Ground: Estádio São Sebastião; Mirandela, Portugal
- Capacity: 3,500
- Chairman: Carlos Correia
- Head Coach: Armando Santos
- League: Portuguese District Championships
- 2021–22: Campeonato de Portugal Serie B, 4th (First stage); Relegation Serie B, 4th (Second stage) (Relegated)
- Website: sportclubemirandela.com.sapo.pt
Home colours	Away colours

Sport Clube de Mirandela (Mirandela) is a Portuguese football club based in the city of Mirandela, in northeast Portugal (Trás-os-Montes region).

== Background ==
Mirandela currently plays in the Segunda Divisão Zona Norte, which is the third tier of Portuguese football. The club was founded in 1926 and they play their home matches at the Estádio São Sebastião in Mirandela. The stadium is able to accommodate 3,500 spectators.

The club is affiliated to Associação de Futebol de Bragança and has entered the national cup competition known as Taça de Portugal on many occasions.

== Appearances ==
- Segunda Divisão: 9
- Terceira Divisão: 42

== Season to season ==
Season	Level	Division	Section	Place	Movements
1990–91	Tier 3	Segunda Divisão	Série Norte	18th	Relegated
1991–92	Tier 4	Terceira Divisão	Série A	18th	Relegated
1992–93	Tier 5	Distritais	AF Bragança – 1ª Divisão		
1993–94	Tier 5	Distritais	AF Bragança – 1ª Divisão		Promoted
1994–95	Tier 4	Terceira Divisão	Série A	18th	Relegated
1995–96	Tier 5	Distritais	AF Bragança – 1ª Divisão		
1996–97	Tier 5	Distritais	AF Bragança – 1ª Divisão		Promoted
1997–98	Tier 4	Terceira Divisão	Série A	18th	Relegated
1998–99	Tier 5	Distritais	AF Bragança – 1ª Divisão	7th	
1999–2000	Tier 5	Distritais	AF Bragança – 1ª Divisão		
2000–01	Tier 5	Distritais	AF Bragança – Honra	2nd	
2001–02	Tier 5	Distritais	AF Bragança – Honra	2st	Promoted (1st team do not accept promotion)
2002–03	Tier 4	Terceira Divisão	Série A	8th	
2003–04	Tier 4	Terceira Divisão	Série A	7th	
2004–05	Tier 4	Terceira Divisão	Série A	10th	
2005–06	Tier 4	Terceira Divisão	Série A	3rd	
2006–07	Tier 4	Terceira Divisão	Série A	3rd	
2007–08	Tier 4	Terceira Divisão	Série A – 1ª Fase	2nd	Promotion Group
	Tier 4	Terceira Divisão	Série A Fase Final	1st	Promoted
2008–09	Tier 3	Segunda Divisão	Série A – 1ª Fase	12th	Relegation Group
	Tier 3	Segunda Divisão	Série A Últimos	6th	Relegated
2009–10	Tier 4	Terceira Divisão	Série A – 1ª Fase	2nd	Promotion Group
	Tier 4	Terceira Divisão	Série A Fase Final	3rd	
2010–11	Tier 4	Terceira Divisão	Série A – 1ª Fase	2nd	Promotion Group
	Tier 4	Terceira Divisão	Série A Fase Final	1st	Promoted
2011–12	Tier 3	Segunda Divisão	Série Norte	4th	
2012–13	Tier 3	Segunda Divisão	Série Norte	3rd	
2013–14	Tier 3	Campeonato Nacional de Seniores	Série A	6th	
2014–15	Tier 3	Campeonato Nacional de Seniores	Série A	2nd	Promotion Group
2015–16	Tier 3	Campeonato de Portugal	Série A	5th	
2016–17	Tier 3	Campeonato de Portugal	Série A	8th	Relegation Group
2017–18	Tier 3	Campeonato de Portugal	Série A	4th	
2018–19	Tier 3	Campeonato de Portugal	Série A	6th	
2019–20	Tier 3	Campeonato de Portugal	Série A	12th	Season Halted
2020–21	Tier 3	Campeonato de Portugal	Série A		

== League and cup history ==
Season	I	II	III	IV	V	Pts.	Pl.	W	L	T	GS	GA	Diff.
1969–70			10			29 pts	30	12	5	13	39	43	−4
1990–91			18										
1991–92				18									
1994–95				18									
1995–96					12								
1996–97					...	...	...	...	...	...	...	...	...
1997–98				18		9 pts	34	2	3	29	18	139	−121
1998–99					7								
2001–02					2								
2002–03				1									
2003–04				7		51 pts	34	14	9	11	49	45	+4
2004–05				9		46 pts	34	12	10	12	43	38	+5
2005–06				3		73 pts	34	22	7	5	65	29	+36
2006–07				3		50 pts	30	14	8	8	40	32	+8
2007–08				2 [1]		46 pts	26	12	10	4	37	21	+16
2008–09			6 [7]			16 pts	22	3	7	12	16	29	−13
2009–10				2 [3]		...	...	...	...	...	...	...	...
2010–11				2 [4]									
2011–12				4									

== Honours ==
- Terceira Divisão, Série A: 2007/08, 2010/11

== Current squad ==
As of 24 December 2021

Note: Flags indicate national team as defined under FIFA eligibility rules; some limited exceptions apply. Players may hold more than one non-FIFA nationality.

No.	Pos.	Nation	Player
1	GK	POR	Júlio Coelho
4	DF	POR	Miguel Fernandes
5	MF	NGA	Saidu Musa
6	DF	POR	Nuno Corunha
7	FW	ARG	Enzo Petretto
8	MF	POR	Mário Borges
9	FW	POR	Carlos
10	MF	POR	Celso Sidney
13	FW	POR	Nani Freitas
14	FW	BRA	Jaílson
15	DF	POR	Márcio Miranda
16	MF	GNB	Edelino Ié
18	FW	GNB	Ibu Mané

No.	Pos.	Nation	Player
19	DF	POR	Diogo Moura
20	FW	POR	Rui Ramos
21	MF	BRA	Luiz Maia
23	FW	POR	Jardel
24	DF	ARG	Gianluca Goudelis
28	DF	POR	Rui Ferreira
31	GK	POR	Rafa Pires
36	MF	ARG	Diego Parini
45	DF	POR	Diogo Bebé
78	DF	POR	Eduardo Aguiar
81	GK	POR	Pedro Palha
87	MF	POR	Luís Amorim
