= Júlio Coelho =

Portuguese footballer

Personal information
- Full name: Júlio Manuel Pires Coelho
- Date of birth: 18 July 1984 (age 42)
- Place of birth: Paços de Ferreira, Portugal
- Height: 1.78 m (5 ft 10 in)
- Position: Goalkeeper

Team information
- Current team: Mirandela

Youth career
- 1991–2003: Paços Ferreira

Senior career*
Years	Team	Apps	(Gls)
2003–2012	Paços Ferreira	21	(0)
2005–2006	→ Nelas (loan)	16	(0)
2008	→ Rebordosa (loan)	1	(0)
2009–2010	→ Rebordosa (loan)	5	(0)
2011–2012	→ Belenenses (loan)	28	(0)
2012–2017	Penafiel	133	(0)
2017–2021	Oliveirense	91	(0)
2021–	Mirandela	13	(0)
- * Club domestic league appearances and goals as of 12:49, 2 February 2022 (UTC)

Júlio Manuel Pires Coelho (born 18 July 1984) is a Portuguese professional footballer who plays for SC Mirandela as a goalkeeper.

== Club career ==
Born in Paços de Ferreira, Coelho spent the vast majority of his career with hometown club F.C. Paços de Ferreira. After reaching the youth system at the age of 7, he made the first team in 2003.

After two years and only one Segunda Liga appearance, Coelho was loaned to lowly sides S.L. Nelas and Rebordosa AC. He was subsequently recalled by Paços, but again only served as a backup, consecutively to Pedro – another youth product born in the city – and Brazilian Peterson Peçanha; the first of his 20 Primeira Liga matches during his spell at the Estádio da Mata Real took place on 6 January 2008, in a 2–1 home win against U.D. Leiria.

Released in the summer of 2012 after one season in the second division with C.F. Os Belenenses, Coelho resumed his career at that level with F.C. Penafiel. He only missed one game in 42 in 2013–14, as the latter returned to the top flight after an eight-year absence. In January 2014 and June 2016, he agreed to contract extensions.

Coelho continued playing in the second tier from 2017 to 2021, with U.D. Oliveirense. On 29 June 2021, after their relegation as last, the 37-year-old signed with SC Mirandela in the fourth.
