= C.D. Estrela =

Portuguese football club

CD Estrela
- Full name: Clube Desportivo Estrela
- Nickname: Tricolores (Tricolours)
- Founded: 28 September 2011; 14 years ago
- Dissolved: 2020; 5 years ago
- Ground: Estádio José Gomes
- Capacity: 9,250
- Chairman: Rui Silva
- Manager: Rui Carrajola
- League: Lisbon FA First Division, Serie 2
- 2018–19: Lisbon FA First Division, Serie 2, 8th
- Website: https://cdestrela.pt

Clube Desportivo Estrela is an association football club, based in Amadora, Portugal. It was founded on 28 September 2011 as a successor club to historic club C.F. Estrela da Amadora which folded the same year.

== History ==
The club was founded by the "Sempre Tricolores" movement, as a way to resurrect the spirit and pay homage to the history of Estrela da Amadora, which was declared insolvent due to financial problems.

The club only worked in the youth leagues until the start of the 2018–19 season. The senior team debuted on 23 September 2018 in a Lisbon FA Cup away match against FC Ota, which the tricolors won 4–1.

In its first season they played in the Lisbon FA First Division Serie 2, level 6 of the Portuguese football league system, and placed 8th in the overall standings out of 16 clubs.

== Recent Seasons ==
Season	Division	Place	Taça de Portugal
2018–19	Lisbon FA First Division	8th	Didn't play

== See also ==
- C.F. Estrela da Amadora
