= Liga Meo Azores =

- Founded: 2013
- Country: Portugal
- Confederation: UEFA
- Divisions: 1
- Number of clubs: 10
- Level on pyramid: 5
- Promotion to: Campeonato de Portugal
- Relegation to: Ponta Delgada FA, Angra do Heroísmo FA and Horta FA
- Current champions: Operário (2nd title) (2023–24)
- Most championships: Angrense (3 titles)
- Current: 2023–24 Liga Meo Azores

The Liga Meo Açores is a Portuguese non-professional league for association football clubs from Azores. It belongs to the 5th tier of the Portuguese football league system with the Liga 3 creation, with promotion to the 4th Tier (Campeonato de Portugal) and relegation to the 6th Tier (Regional championships from Ponta Delgada FA, Angra do Heroísmo FA and Horta FA).

== Current format ==
The league consists in ten teams playing a round robin as a regular season. After that teams 1 to 5 play a championship group, teams 6 to 10 play a relegation group. The points obtained in the regular season are added to those in the playoffs. The winner of the championship group is crowned the champion and qualifies for Campeonato de Portugal. The teams in the last three places of the relegation group get relegated to the Ponta Delgada FA, Angra do Heroísmo FA and Horta FA championships.

== Teams ==
For the 2023-2024 season:

Region	Team/s
São Miguel Island	Benfica Águia Sport; Operário; São Roque; União Micaelense; Vitória P. da Pedra
Terceira Island	Angrense; Lajense; Praiense
Graciosa Island	Sp. Guadalupe
São Jorge Island	FC Urzelinense

== List of champions ==
The following teams won the league:

- 2013–14 Angrense (1)
- 2014–15 Sporting Ideal (1)
- 2015–16 Lusitânia (1)
- 2016–17 Sp. Guadalupe (1)
- 2017–18 Angrense (2)
- 2018-19 Fontinhas (1)
- 2019-20 Rabo de Peixe (1)
- 2020-21 Operário (1)
- 2021–22 Angrense (3)
- 2022–23 Lusitânia (2)
- 2023-24 Operário (2)
