= Clube Condeixa =

Association football club in Bermuda

- Full name: Clube de Condeixa Associação Cultural e Desportiva
- Founded: 1900
- Stadium: Estádio Municipal de Condeixa-a-Nova
- League: Divisão de Honra da Associação de Futebol de Coimbra

Clube de Condeixa Associação Cultural e Desportiva is a Portuguese football team based in Condeixa-a-Nova, Coimbra. The club presently competes in the Divisão de Honra da Associação de Futebol de Coimbra. Its stadium is Estadio Municipal de Condeixa-a-Nova.

== History ==
The club was founded in 1900. In 2018, they won the Taça AF Coimbra and also won the Supertaça AF Coimbra. They repeated as champions of the Taça AF Coimbra the following season. In 2019, the club won the Divisão de Honra da Associação de Futebol de Coimbra, earning promotion to the third-tier Campeonato de Portugal. In 2021, the club was nearly promoted to the new third tier Liga 3, after advancing to the promotion stage of the Campeonato de Portugal.

== League history ==
- 2017–2018: Divisão de Honra da Associação de Futebol de Coimbra
- 2018–2019: Divisão de Honra da Associação de Futebol de Coimbra
- 2019–2020: Campeonato de Portugal
- 2020–21: Campeonato de Portugal
- 2021–22: Campeonato de Portugal
- 2022–23: Divisão de Honra da Associação de Futebol de Coimbra

== Titles ==
Competician	Number of Titles	Seasons
Divisão de Honra da Associação de Futebol de Coimbra	1	2018–2019
Supertaça AF Coimbra	1	2017–2018
Taça AF Coimbra	2	2017-2018 / 2018–2019
