= S.C. Mêda =

Portuguese football club

Mêda
- Full name: Sporting Clube de Mêda
- Founded: 1946
- Ground: Estádio Dr. Augusto César de Carvalho; Mêda; Portugal
- Capacity: 3,000
- Chairman: José Lemos
- League: Terceira Divisão Série B
Home colours

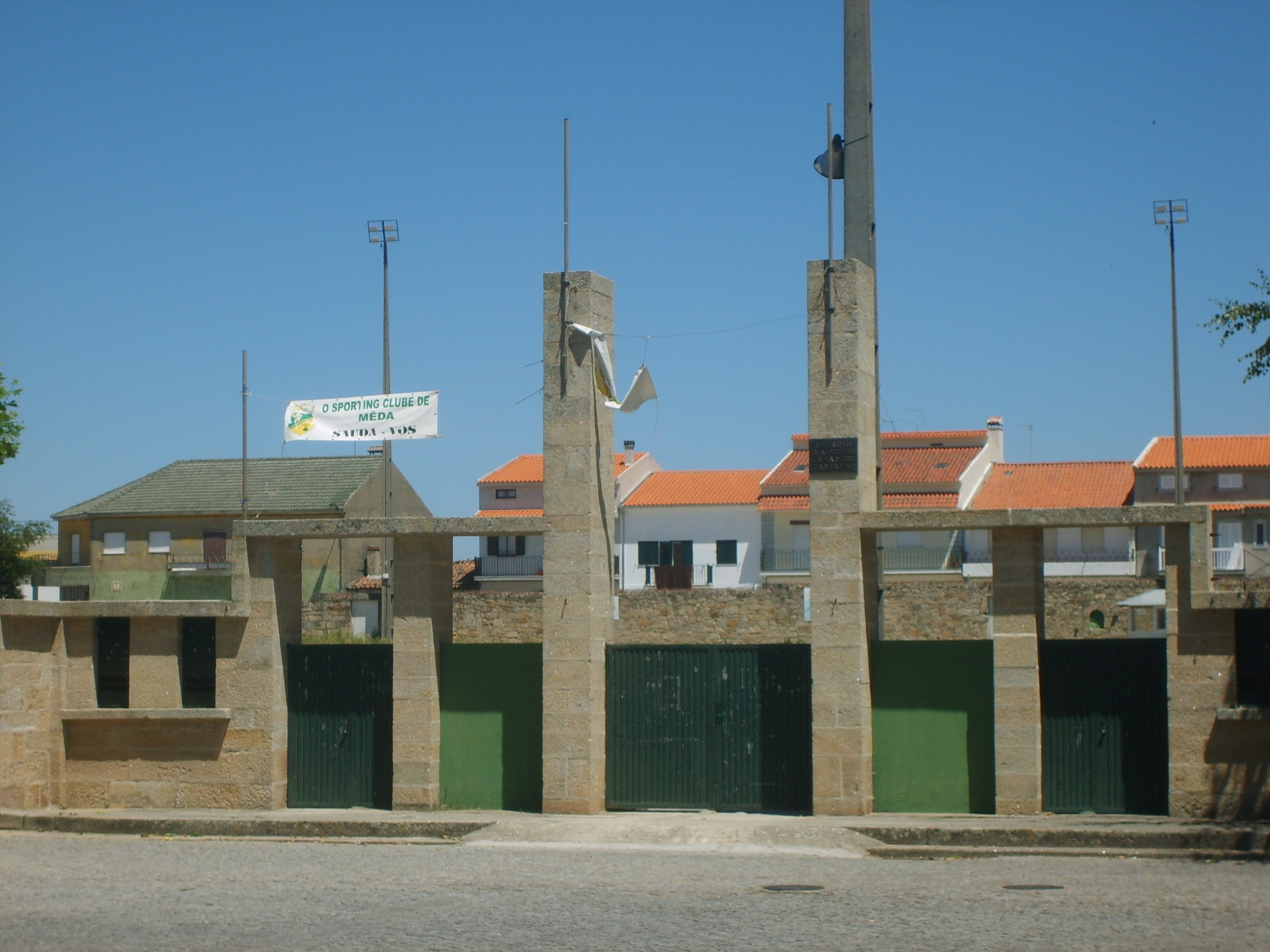
Estádio Dr. Augusto César de Carvalho

Sporting Clube de Mêda (abbreviated as SC Mêda) is a Portuguese football club based in Mêda in the district of Guarda.

== Background ==
SC Mêda currently plays in the Terceira Divisão Série B which is the fourth tier of Portuguese football. The club was founded in 1946 and they play their home matches at the Estádio Dr. Augusto César de Carvalho in Mêda. The stadium is able to accommodate 3,000 spectators.

The club is affiliated to Associação de Futebol da Guarda and has competed in the AF Guarda Taça. The club has also entered the national cup competition known as Taça de Portugal on a few occasions.

== Season to season ==
Season	Level	Division	Section	Place	Movements
1990–91	Tier 5	Distritais	AF Guarda – 1ª Divisão		
1991–92	Tier 5	Distritais	AF Guarda – 1ª Divisão		
1992–93	Tier 5	Distritais	AF Guarda – 1ª Divisão		
1993–94	Tier 5	Distritais	AF Guarda – 1ª Divisão		Relegated
1994–95	Tier 6	Distritais	AF Guarda – 2ª Divisão A		Promoted
1995–96	Tier 5	Distritais	AF Guarda – 1ª Divisão		
1996–97	Tier 5	Distritais	AF Guarda – 1ª Divisão		
1997–98	Tier 5	Distritais	AF Guarda – 1ª Divisão		
1998–99	Tier 5	Distritais	AF Guarda – 1ª Divisão	11th	
1999–2000	Tier 5	Distritais	AF Guarda – 1ª Divisão		
2000–01	Tier 5	Distritais	AF Guarda – 1ª Divisão	12th	
2001–02	Tier 5	Distritais	AF Guarda – 1ª Divisão	14th	
2002–03	Tier 5	Distritais	AF Guarda – 1ª Divisão	4th	
2003–04	Tier 5	Distritais	AF Guarda – 1ª Divisão	7th	
2004–05	Tier 5	Distritais	AF Guarda – 1ª Divisão	4th	
2005–06	Tier 5	Distritais	AF Guarda – 1ª Divisão	8th	
2006–07	Tier 5	Distritais	AF Guarda – 1ª Divisão	4th	
2007–08	Tier 5	Distritais	AF Guarda – Honra	2nd	
2008–09	Tier 5	Distritais	AF Guarda – 1ª Divisão	1st	Promoted
2009–10	Tier 4	Terceira Divisão	Série C – 1ª Fase	11th	Relegation Group
	Tier 4	Terceira Divisão	Série C Últimos	4th	Relegated
2010–11	Tier 5	Distritais	AF Guarda – 1ª Divisão	1st	Promoted
2011–12	Tier 4	Terceira Divisão	Série B – 1ª Fase	9th	Relegation Group
	Tier 4	Terceira Divisão	Série B Últimos	4th	Relegated

== Honours ==
- AF Guarda 1ª Divisão: 2008/09, 2010/11
