= GDR Gafetense =

Portuguese football club

GD Resende
- Full name: Grupo Desportivo e Recreativo Gafetense
- Founded: 18 January 1979; 47 years ago
- Ground: Estadio Armando Pequito; Gáfete
- Capacity: 1,000
- League: Honra AF Portalegre
- 2019–20: Honra AF Portalegre, 5th
- Website: https://www.omeuclube.org/gafetense/

Grupo Desportivo e Recreativo Gafetense is a Portuguese football club located in Gáfete, Portugal.

== Colours and badge ==
Resende's colours are white and blue.
