= Stéphane Agbre Dasse =

Burkinabé footballer (born 1989)

Stéphane
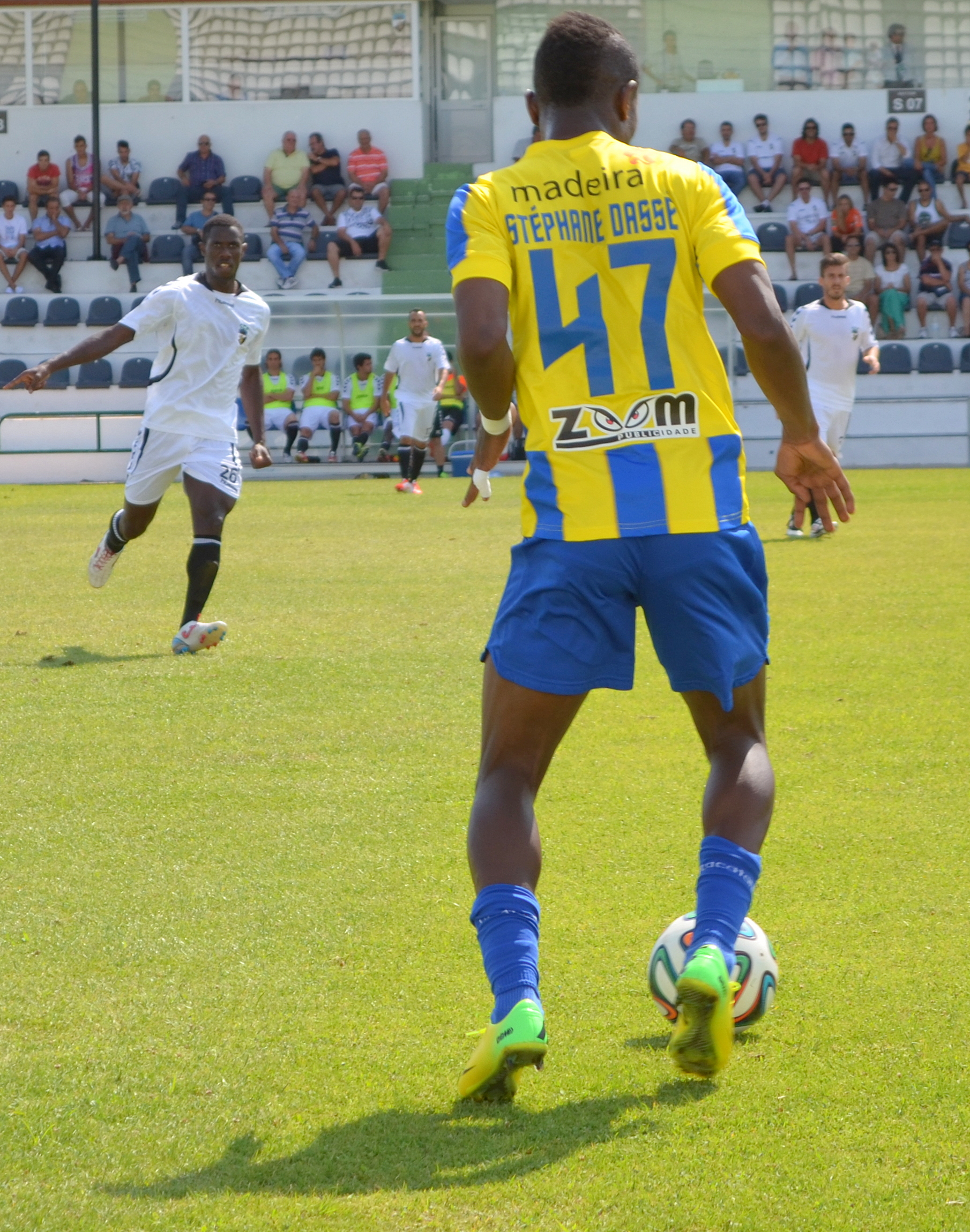

Personal information
- Full name: Stéphane Agbré Dasse
- Date of birth: 5 July 1989 (age 37)
- Place of birth: Bingerville, Ivory Coast
- Height: 1.80 m (5 ft 11 in)
- Position: Left back

Team information
- Current team: US Lusitanos

Youth career
- 2006–2008: Porto

Senior career*
Years	Team	Apps	(Gls)
2008–2009	Porto	0	(0)
2008–2009	→ Olhanense (loan)	24	(0)
2009–2012	Olhanense	4	(0)
2010–2011	→ Penafiel (loan)	13	(0)
2011–2012	Atlético CP	22	(0)
2012–2014	Arouca	22	(1)
2014−2015	União da Madeira	41	(0)
2015−2016	Chaves	12	(0)
2016–2017	Académico de Viseu	29	(0)
2017–2018	Shukura Kobuleti	20	(0)
2018–2019	Leixões	13	(0)
2019–	US Lusitanos	0	(0)

International career
2009–2010	Burkina Faso	2	(0)
- * Club domestic league appearances and goals as of 00:10, 29 July 2019 (UTC)

Stéphane Agbré Dasse (born 5 July 1989 in Bingerville), is a Burkinabé footballer, who plays as a left back for US Lusitanos Saint-Maur.

== Career ==
Stéphane began his career in 2006 with F.C. Porto, who called him to the first squad in June 2008. In July of the same year, he was loaned out until the end of the season to the Liga de Honra club S.C. Olhanense. After a good season, his club S.C. Olhanense pulled the sold option and he signed a contract until 30 June 2012.

Ahead of the 2019/20 season, Dasse joined French club US Lusitanos Saint-Maur.

== International career ==
The Ivorian-born Stéphane was called for the Burkina Faso national football team match in the 2010 FIFA World Cup qualification against Guinea on 28 March 2009.

Despite being capped by the Burkina Faso national team, as of January 2012, the Burkinabé Football Association no long believe the player to be eligible for the national squad.
