= A.R.C. Oleiros =

Portuguese football club

- Full name: Associação Recreativa Cultural de Oleiros
- Founded: 1976; 50 years ago
- Ground: Estádio Municipal de Oleiros, Oleiros
- Capacity: 2500
- League: N/A
- 2021–22: Campeonato de Portugal, 2th, Serie G Relegation Group

Associação Recreativa Cultural de Oleiros is a Portuguese sports club based in Oleiros.

The men's football team played in the Campeonato de Portugal, the fourth tier of Portuguese football in the 2021–22 season. The team was promoted to the league, then the third tier, for the 2016–17 season. The club did not enter the 2022–23 season of the competition. In the Taça de Portugal, Oleiros reached the third round in 2017–18 and 2020–21.
