= Horta Football Association =

Football Association of Horta
- Abbreviation: AF Horta
- Formation: October 21, 1930; 96 years ago
- Type: NGO
- Legal status: Foundation
- Purpose: Football Association
- Location: Horta (Azores), Portugal
- Region served: Faial, Pico, Flores, Corvo
- Official language: Portuguese
- President: Eduardo Pereira
- Vice-President: Luís Garcia
- Vice-President: Alberto Ventura
- Assembly President: Jorge Alberto Costa Pereira
- Parent organization: Portuguese Football Federation
- Website: afhorta.fpf.pt
- Formerly called: Associação de Futebol de Horta

The Horta Football Association (Portuguese: Associação de Futebol de Horta) is one of the 22 District Football Associations that are affiliated with the Portuguese Football Federation. The AF Horta administers lower-tier football in the municipalities on the islands of Faial, Pico, Flores and Corvo, as well as those clubs registered in the islands.

== History ==
The foundation of the Football Association of Horta was only possible after the founding of many of the football clubs that marked its history, and specifically the founding of the Fayal Sport Club, Angústias Atlético Clube and Sporting Club da Horta. Even in its early history, Horta was known as the "Azorean city of Sporting Excellence", and on 2 February 1909, the Fayal Sport Club was established by an enthusiastic group of students from the Liceu of Horta (its first President was Manuel Tânger). Since there were no other club on the island at the time, the Fayal Sport played against visiting foreign workers of the submarine cable companies, and in particular, the British Football Club. Although the events were well contested, the games themselves were friendly, with no organizational structure. Interest in association football was so popular that, in 1913, Fayal S.C. completed its first inter-island game in Ponta Delgada, winning the matches and tournament in the regional capital.

It took another 14 years before another team, the Sporting Club da Horta was founded on 28 May 1922, under the direction of its first president Domingos Homem Garcia. In the same year, Fayal S.C. invited Casa Pia, and its celebrated kicker Cândido de Oliveira for a match. This was a precursor to the founding of the 'Angústias Atlético Clube' (Angustias Athletic Club), was formed on 6 January 1923, under the direction of their first President Manuel Stattmiller de Saldanha e Albuquerque.

These changes and the growth of the popularity laid the seeds for the creation of the Football Association. In January 1924, the British Football Club proposed the "constitution of an Association" to begin operating almost immediately, while Fayal S.C. suggested that an association would be more practical in the proceeding season. Unfortunately, the three principal clubs did not intend in the formative period of the association's creation.

In 1928, there were contacts between clubs to organize an Azorean Championship. The three teams on Faial met on 21 October 1930, at the Grémio Literário Artista Fayalense in the Largo do Bispo represented by António de Sousa Ramos Jr. (Fayal Sport Club), Jaime Maria Soares de Melo (Angústias Atletico Club), and Manuel d'Azevedo Castro Neves (Sporting Clube da Horta), whom achieved a consensus to form the Asociação de Futebol da Horta.

== Notable clubs ==
Historically, the following teams were important in the development of association football on the islands, and responsible for the founding of the Horta Football Association:

- Angústias AC
- FC Madalena
- SC Horta

== Current Divisions - 2023–24 Season ==
The AF Horta runs the following division covering the sixth tier of the Portuguese football league system.

Faial/Pico

- Angústias FC
- CD Lajense
- Club Fraternidade
- Fayal Sport Clube
- Futebol Clube da Madalena
- Futebol Clube dos Flamengos
- Vitória do Pico

== See also ==
- Portuguese District Football Associations
- Portuguese football competitions
- List of football clubs in Portugal
