= Gáfete =

Parish in Crato, Portugal

- Civil parish
- Location in Portugal
- Coordinates: 39.410°N 7.685°W
- Country: Portugal
- Region: Alentejo
- Intermunic. comm.: Alto Alentejo
- District: Portalegre
- Municipality: Crato

Area
  - Total: 46.15 km^{2} (17.82 sq mi)

Population (2011)
  - Total: 856
  - Density: 18.5/km^{2} (48.0/sq mi)
- Time zone: UTC+00:00 (WET)
  - Summer (DST): UTC+01:00 (WEST)

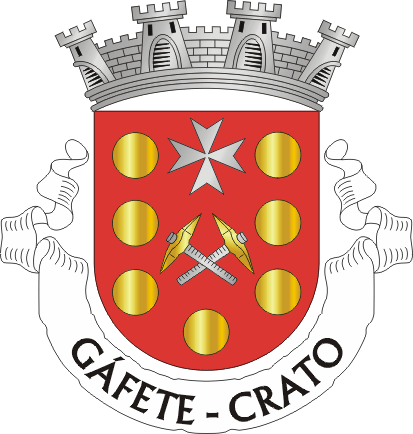
Coat of arms of Gáfete

Gáfete is a Portuguese village and parish in the municipality of Crato. The population in 2011 was 856, in an area of 46.15 km^{2}.

== History ==
It was the county seat between 1688 and 1836. In 1801 it included only one parish and had 851 inhabitants. Gáfete was one of the 12 villages of the Priory of Crato. It had a new charter, given by Dom Pedro II in 1688. After that it, Gáfete became Vila Nova de São João Batista de Gáfete (New village of St. John the Baptist of Gáfete), but eventually returned to the old name. The Municipality of Gáfete lasted until 1836, when it was extinguished, and integrated as a parish in the municipality of Alpalhão; it remained there until August 3, 1863. The Municipality of Gáfete had a Mercy Hospital and a Town Hall.

== Heritage ==
Gáfete Parish Church was built in the 16th century. It is one of the priory churches represented in the Codex Pedro Nunes Tinoco. Its patron saint is St. John the Baptist. The church underwent changes and additions in the 17th and 18th centuries.
