= Guarda Football Association =

Football governing body of Guarda, Portugal

The Guarda Football Association (Associação de Futebol da Guarda, abrv. AF Guarda) is the district governing body for the all football competitions in the Portuguese district of Guarda. It is also the regulator of the clubs registered in the district.

== Notable clubs in the Guarda FA ==
- Guarda
- SC Mêda

== Current Divisions - 2013–14 Season ==
The AF Guarda runs the following divisions covering the fourth and fifth tiers of the Portuguese football league system.

=== 1ª divisão ===
- Associação Cultural Desportiva do Soito
- Associação Desportiva Recreativa e Cultural de Aguiar da Beira
- Centro Cultural Desportivo e Recreativo de Vila Cortês do Mondego
- Clube de Futebol Os Vilanovenses
- Clube Desportivo de Gouveia
- Ginásio Clube Figueirense
- Grupo Desportivo de Trancoso
- Grupo Desportivo de Vila Nova de Foz Coa-
- Sporting Clube Celoricense
- Sporting Clube da Mêda
- Sporting Clube da Sociedade de Instrução e Recreio de Paços da Serra
- Sporting Clube de Sabugal
- Sporting Clube de Vilar Formoso
- União Desportiva Os Pinhelenses

=== 2ª divisão ===
- Associação Cultural e Desportiva Estrela de Almeida
- Associação Cultural e Desportiva de Vila Franca das Naves
- Associação Desportiva de Fornos de Algodres
- Futebol Clube de Pala
- Grupo Cultural e Recreativo Casal de Cinza
- Guarda Unida Desportiva
- Mileu Guarda Sport Clube

== Winners ==
- 1947/48: CF Gouveienses
- 1948/49: SC Gouveia
- 1949/50: União da Guarda
- 1950/51: União da Guarda
- 1951/52: Amieiros Verdes-Manteigas
- 1952/53: CF Gouveienses
- 1953/54: Not Held
- 1954/55: Sporting de Gouveia
- 1955/56: Sporting de Gouveia
- 1956/57: Not Held
- 1957/58: Sporting de Gouveia
- 1958/59: ACD Guarda
- 1959/60: Sporting de Gouveia
- 1960/61: Sporting de Gouveia
- 1961/62: ACD Guarda
- 1962/63: Sporting de Gouveia
- 1963/64: ACD Guarda
- 1964/65: CD Gouveia
- 1965/66: CD Gouveia
- 1966/67: CD Gouveia
- 1967/68: ACD Guarda
- 1968/69: SC Gonçalense
- 1969/70: GD Trancoso
- 1970/71: SC Celorico
- 1971/72: Vilar Formoso
- 1972/73: ACD Guarda
- 1973/74: Os Pinhelenses
- 1974/75: Os Vilanovenses
- 1975/76: GD Trancoso
- 1976/77: SC Gonçalense
- 1977/78: Os Vilanovenses
- 1978/79: AD Fornos de Algodres
- 1979/80: Os Vilanovenses
- 1980/81: Desp. Seia
- 1981/82: AD S. Romão
- 1982/83: CD Gouveia
- 1983/84: Desp. Seia
- 1984/85: Os Vilanovenses
- 1985/86: Desp. Seia
- 1986/87: Os Vilanovenses
- 1987/88: AD S. Romão
- 1988/89: SC Sabugal
- 1989/90: GD Foz Côa
- 1990/91: Desp. Seia
- 1991/92: Os Pinhelenses
- 1992/93: SC Celorico
- 1993/94: AD Fornos de Algodres
- 1994/95: GD Foz Côa
- 1995/96: AD S. Romão
- 1996/97: Os Pinhelenses
- 1997/98: AD S. Romão
- 1998/99: Mileu Guarda SC
- 1999/00: CD Gouveia
- 2000/01: Mileu Guarda SC
- 2001/02: CD Gouveia
- 2002/03: ADRC Aguiar da Beira
- 2003/04: Souropires
- 2004/05: AD Fornos de Algodres
- 2005/06: Desp. Seia
- 2006/07: Ginásio Clube Figueirense
- 2007/08: AD Fornos de Algodres
- 2008/09: SC Mêda
- 2009/10: ADRC Aguiar da Beira
- 2010/11: SC Mêda
- 2011/12: ADRC Aguiar da Beira
- 2012/13: AD Manteigas
- 2013/14: CD Gouveia
- 2014/15: Sabugal
- 2015/16: CD Gouveia
- 2016/17: AD Fornos de Algodres

== See also ==
- Portuguese District Football Associations
- Portuguese football competitions
- List of football clubs in Portugal
