= Bragança Football Association =

District football association

Associação de Futebol de Bragança
- Abbreviation: AF Bragança
- Formation: 1925
- Purpose: District Football Association
- Headquarters: Bairro da Coxa – Fundo Fomento Habitação
- Location(s): Bloco C - Entrada 1 Apartado 9 5301–901 Bragança Portugal
- President: Eduardo Humberto Pires Ane
- Website: afBragança.pt

The Associação de Futebol de Bragança (Bragança Football Association) is one of the 22 District Football Associations that are affiliated to the Portuguese Football Federation. The AF Bragança administers lower tier football in the district of Bragança.

== Background ==
Associação de Futebol de Bragança, commonly referred to as AF Bragança, is the governing body for football in the district of Bragança. The Football Association is based in Bragança. The Association's President is Eduardo Humberto Pires Ane.

The organisation was founded on 30 September 1930 and was affiliated to the Portuguese Football Federation on 24 January 1931. Sport Clube de Mirandela represented the district of Bragança in the national championships in those early years. From 1945 until 1953 there is no evidence that AF Bragança was operating and leading clubs affiliated to AF Vila Real.

== Competitions ==
In 2013-14 3 Bragança clubs compete in the national levels of the Portuguese football league system in Campeonato Nacional de Seniores (the third level of the Portuguese football league system), a competition run by the Portuguese Football Federation.

Below the Campeonato Nacional de Seniores (Portuguese third level) the competitions are organised at a district level (known in Portuguese as Distritais) with each District Association organising its competitions according to geographical and other factors. The AF Bragança runs one league competition known as the Division of Honour (Honra) at the fourth level of the league system and a cup competition known as Taça AF Bragança. At one time there were two divisions in the league, known as Honra and 1ª divisão but this format was dropped in 2005/06.

In more general terms the AF Bragança currently organises District Championships for football and Futsal for men and women for all age groups including Senior, Junior, Youth, Beginners, Infants and Schools.

== Notable clubs affiliated to AF Bragança ==
- GD Bragança
- SC Mirandela
- CA Macedo de Cavaleiros

== Current Divisions - 2013–14 season ==
The AF Bragança runs the following division covering the fourth tier of the Portuguese football league system.

=== Honra ===
- Águia Futebol Clube de Vimioso
- Associação Desportiva e Cultural de Rebordelo
- Associação Estudantes Africanos de Bragança
- Associação Recreativa Alfandeguense
- Centro Cultural e Desportivo Minas de Argozelo
- Futebol Clube de Vinhais
- Grupo Desportivo de Bragança B
- Grupo Desportivo de Poiares
- Grupo Desportivo de Sendim
- Grupo Desportivo de Torre de Moncorvo
- Grupo Desportivo e Cultural de Santa Comba da Vilariça
- Grupo Desportivo Mirandês
- Sport Clube Mirandela B
- Vila Flor Sport Clube

== Former participants ==
Other clubs that have competed in the Distritais since the 1992/93 season include:

- Associação Cultural Desportiva e Recreativa Bela Vista
- Associação Desportiva de Coelhoso
- Associação Desportiva e Cultural de Freixo de Espada à Cinta
- Associação Desportiva e Recreativa de Morais
- Associação Recreativa Social União de São Pedro dos Serracenos
- Centro Cultural e Recreativo de Lamas
- Clube Atlético de Macedo de Cavaleiros
- Clube Desportivo e Cultural de Carção
- Clube Desportivo Izeda
- Futebol Clube de Carrazeda de Ansiães
- Futebol Clube Mãe de Água
- Futebol Clube Mogadourense
- Grupo Desportivo de Milhão
- Grupo Desportivo e Cultural de Santa Comba da Vilariça
- Grupo Desportivo e Recreativo de Talhas
- Grupo Desportivo e Recreativo de Vilas Boas
- Grupo Desportivo Parada
- Grupo Desportivo Torre de Moncorvo
- Grupo Desportivo Torre Dona Chama
- Grupo Recreativo Santulhão
- Morais Futebol Clube
- Sport Clube Mirandela

== District championships ==
=== Champions ===
Season	Championship	Cup
1930/31	SC Mirandela	
1931/32	SC Mirandela	
1932/33	SC Mirandela	
1933/34	SC Mirandela	
1934/35	SC Mirandela	
1935/36	SC Mirandela	
1936/37	SC Mirandela	
1937/38	SC Mirandela	
1938/39	SC Mirandela	
1939/40	SC Mirandela	
1940/1953	Not Held	
1953/54	SC Mirandela	
1954/55	SC Mirandela	
1955/56	SC Mirandela	
1956/57	GD Bragança	
1957/58	GD Bragança	
1958/59	SC Mirandela	
1959/60	GD Bragança	
1960/61	GD Bragança	
1961/62	GD Bragança	
1962/63	SC Mirandela	
1963/64	GD Bragança	
1964/65	SC Mirandela	
1965/66	SC Mirandela	
1966/67	SC Mirandela	
1967/68	GD Bragança	
1968/69	GD Torre de Moncorvo	
1969/70	CA Macedo de Cavaleiros	
1970/71	GD Bragança	
1971/72	GD Torre de Moncorvo	
1972/73	GD Bragança	
1973/74	GD Torre de Moncorvo	
1974/75	SC Mirandela	
1975/76	CA Macedo de Cavaleiros	
1976/77	CA Macedo de Cavaleiros	
1977/78	CA Macedo de Cavaleiros	
1978/79	CA Macedo de Cavaleiros	
1979/80	CA Macedo de Cavaleiros	
1980/81	GD Sendim	
1981/82	CA Macedo de Cavaleiros	
1982/83	FC Mogadourense	
1983/84	CA Macedo de Cavaleiros	
1984/85	GD Cachão	
1985/86	FC Vinhais	
1986/87	GD Mirandês	
1987/88	GD Torre de Moncorvo	
1988/89	SC Mirandela	
1989/90	FC Mogadourense	GD Torre de Moncorvo
1990/91	GD Torre de Moncorvo	GD Torre de Moncorvo
1991/92	FC Mãe d'Água	Not held
1992/93	CA Macedo de Cavaleiros	Not held
1993/94	SC Mirandela	Not held
1994/95	FC Mogadourense	GD Sendim
1995/96	CA Macedo de Cavaleiros	FC Carrezeda
1996/97	SC Mirandela	FC Carrezeda
1997/98	GD Mirandês	GD Mirandês
1998/99	GD Torre de Moncorvo	GD Torre de Moncorvo
1999/2000	GD Mirandês	CA Macedo de Cavaleiros
2000/01	CA Macedo de Cavaleiros	CA Macedo de Cavaleiros
2001/02	FC Mogadourense	SC Mirandela
2002/03	Rebordelo	CA Macedo de Cavaleiros
2003/04	FC Mogadourense	CA Macedo de Cavaleiros
2004/05	FC Vinhais	CA Macedo de Cavaleiros
2005/06	CA Macedo de Cavaleiros	CA Macedo de Cavaleiros
2006/07	Morais FC	GD Mirandês
2007/08	FC Mãe d'Água	Águia de Vimioso FC
2008/09	Morais FC	Morais FC
2009/10	Argozelo	GD Mirandês
2010/11	GD Torre de Moncorvo	GD Torre de Moncorvo
2011/12	Argozelo	Rebordelo
2012/13	Vila Flôr	GD Torre de Moncorvo
2013/14	GD Torre de Moncorvo	Argozelo
2014/15	Argozelo	Águia de Vimioso FC
2015/16	Águia de Vimioso FC	GD Sendim
2016/17	Argozelo	Argozelo

== List of member clubs ==
Abbreviation	Settlement	Official Name	Division (tier)	Cup	Other information
Águia FC Vimioso	Vimioso	Águia Futebol Clube de Vimioso	Distritais (4)	None	
Alfandeguense	Alfândega da Fé	Associação Recreativa Alfandeguense	Distritais (4)	*	
Argozelo	Argozelo, Vimioso	Centro Cultural e Desportivo das Minas de Argozelo	Distritais (4)	None	
Bragança	Bragança	Grupo Desportivo de Bragança	National (3)	* *	
Bragança	Bragança	Grupo Desportivo de Bragança B	Distritais (4)	None	
Carção	Carção, Vimioso	Clube Desportivo e Cultural de Carção	Distritais (F)	None	
C. Ansiães	Carrazeda de Ansiães	Futebol Clube Carrazeda de Ansiães	Distritais (F)	*	
CCR Lamas	Lamas, Macedo de Cavaleiros	Centro Cultural e Recreativo de Lamas	Distritais (F)	None	
Estudantes Africanos	Bragança	Associação de Estudantes Africanos do IPB	Distritais (4)	None	
FC Vinhais	Vinhais	Futebol Clube de Vinhais	Distritais (4)	*	
GD Milhão	Milhão, Bragança	Grupo Desportivo Milhão	Distritais (F)	None	
GD Poiares	Poiares, Freixo de Espada à Cinta	Grupo Desportivo de Poiares	Distritais (4)	None	
GD Sendim	Sendim, Miranda do Douro	Grupo Desportivo de Sendim	Distritais (4)	*	
Macedo de Cavaleiros	Macedo de Cavaleiros	Clube Atético Macedo de Cavaleiros	Distritais (F)	* *	
Mãe de Água	Bragança	Futebol Clube Mãe d´Água	Distritais (F)	*	
Mirandela	Mirandela	Sport Clube de Mirandela	National (3)	* *	
Mirandela	Mirandela	Sport Clube de Mirandela B	Distritais (4)	None	
Mirandês	Miranda do Douro	Grupo Desportivo Mirandês	Distritais (4)	*	
Mogadourense	Mogadouro	Futebol Clube Mogadourense	Distritais (F)	* *	
Morais FC	Morais, Macedo de Cavaleiros	Morais Futebol Clube	Distritais (F)	*	
Rebordelo	Rebordelo, Vinhais	Associação Desportiva e Cultural de Rebordelo	Distritais (4)	*	
Santa Comba da Vilariça	Santa Comba de Vilariça, Vila Flor	Grupo Desportivo e Cultural de Santa Comba da Vilariça	Distritais (4)	None	
Talhas	Talhas, Macedo de Cavaleiros	Grupo Desportivo e Recreativo de Talhas	Distritais (F)	None	
Torre Moncorvo	Torre de Moncorvo	Grupo Desportivo de Torre de Moncorvo	Distritais (4)	* *	
Vila Flôr	Vila Flôr	Vila Flôr Sport Clube	Distritais (4)	*	

Footnote

- 1-10 games in Portuguese Cup. *
- 11-100 games in Portuguese Cup. * *
- 101+ games in Portuguese Cup. * * *

== See also ==
- Portuguese District Football Associations
- Portuguese football competitions
- List of football clubs in Portugal
