= S.C. Mineiro Aljustrelense =

Portuguese association football club

S.C.M. Aljustrelense
- Full name: Sport Clube Mineiro Aljustrelense
- Founded: 1933
- Ground: Estádio Municipal De Aljustrel; Aljustrel, Beja
- Capacity: 4,500
- Chairman: Emídio Charrua
- Manager: Carlos Piteira
- League: Beja FA
- 2022–23: Beja FA championship, 7th – First phase

Sport Clube Mineiro Aljustrelense is a Portuguese football club that competes in the Beja FA. They were founded in 1933.

== History ==
At the end of the 20s, a group of young people, They decided to get together to create a club, but it was only in 1933 that the club was founded. The club's first football field was called "A Cabanita", where the club's old headquarters were located. In 1938, they managed to establish themselves at the Municipal Stadium of Aljustrel, the current sports headquarters of Mineiro Aljustrelense.

In World War II, with the temporary stoppage of Aljustrel mine, the club suffered consequences and almost collapsed, but in 1946–47, The club gained the chance to participate in official competitions, with the fusion of others 2 clubs from Beja, the club gained some players who were released from these two clubs, so they competed for the Segunda Divisão, gaining share by being District Champions in 1948–49.

In 1970, the club created its first basketball sector. In the 70s, the club created a youth base, with the youth team, the club reached the semi-finals, where they lost to Benfica, In 1976, the club achieved 3rd place in Série F of the Third Division. A year earlier, in 1975, the club's youth sector stopped participating in official competitions, but in 1982, the youth sector returned to participate in official competitions.

In the following years, the club created sectors of athletics, camping and handball, the club after that always competed in the district championships and Terceira Divisão, And currently the club competes in the AF Beja.

== Current squad ==
As of 17 February 2024

Note: Flags indicate national team as defined under FIFA eligibility rules; some limited exceptions apply. Players may hold more than one non-FIFA nationality.

No.	Pos.	Nation	Player
1	GK	BRA	Ronan Silva
2	DF	POR	Rui Pirralho
3	DF	POR	Duarte Serrano
4	DF	POR	Gonçalo Piteira
5	DF	BRA	Victor Nascimento
6	DF	SEN	Zazá
7	MF	GBS	Abudu
8	DF	POR	Diogo Camacho
9	FW	POR	Luís Costa
10	FW	CPV	Omar Lopes
11	FW	CPV	Kleiton Semedo

No.	Pos.	Nation	Player
13	MF	CPV	Rony Tavares
14	DF	GBS	Gilson Correia
15	MF	POR	Guilherme Piteira
16	MF	POR	José Guerreiro
17	FW	POR	Ivo Pereira
18	FW	BRA	Jaber Souza
20	MF	POR	Diogo Tuxa
22	FW	BRA	Vinicius de Freitas
23	FW	POR	Tomás Varela
24	GK	POR	Guilherme Coelho

== Honours ==
- Terceira Divisão

- Winners(1): 2007-08

- AF Beja First Division

- Winners(18): 1948-49, 1953-54, 1959-60, 1960-61, 1961-62, 1962-63, 1963-64, 1964-65, 1971-72, 1975-76, 1983-84, 1989-90, 1998-99, 2003-04, 2006-07, 2013-14, 2015-16, 2018-19

- AF Beja Taça

- Winners(3): 1997-98, 2015-16, 2017-18

- AF Beja Supertaça

- Winners(4): 2013-14, 2015-16, 2017-18, 2018-19
