= Coimbra Football Association =

Football association in Portugal

Associação de Futebol de Coimbra
- Abbreviation: AF Coimbra
- Formation: 1922
- Purpose: District Football Association
- Headquarters: Rua Ferreira Borges, 155 – 2º
- Location(s): 3000–180 Coimbra ou Apartado 6077–301 Coimbra Portugal
- President: Apolino Manuel dos Santos Pereira
- Website: afCoimbra.com

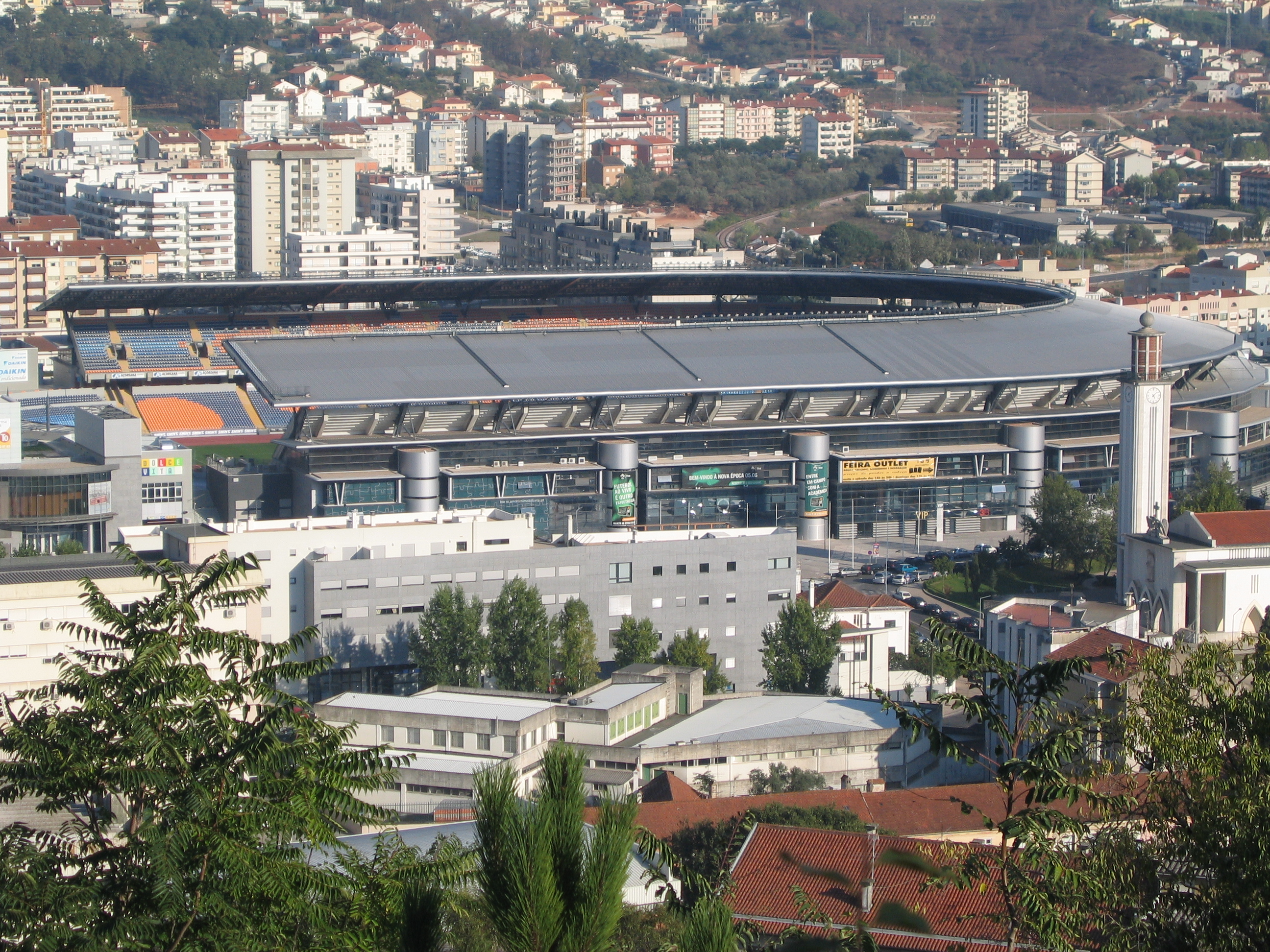
Estádio Efapel Cidade de Coimbra

The Associação de Futebol de Coimbra (Coimbra Football Association) is one of the 22 District Football Associations that are affiliated to the Portuguese Football Federation. The AF Coimbra administers lower tier football in the district of Coimbra.

== Background ==
Associação de Futebol de Coimbra, commonly referred to as AF Coimbra, is the governing body for football in the district of Coimbra. The football association is based in Coimbra. The association's president is Apolino Manuel dos Santos Pereira.

The organisation was founded on 22 October 1922 following meetings held at Sport Clube Conimbricense. The provisional constitution was prepared by Dr. Mário Machado, Manuel Camões, João Barata and Lt. Ribeiro da Costa.

== Competitions ==
Coimbra clubs compete in two of the three national levels of the Portuguese football league system in competitions run by the Portuguese League for Professional Football (Primeira Liga and Segunda Liga) and Portuguese Football Federation (Campeonato Nacional de Seniores). Associação Académica de Coimbra – O.A.F. play in the Primeira Liga and União de Coimbra competes in honor division, of Coimbra Football Association.

The Campeonato Nacional de Seniores the competitions are organised at a district level (known in Portuguese as distritais) with each district association organising its competitions according to geographical and other factors. The AF Coimbra runs two league competitions known as the Division of Honour (honra) at the fourth level of the league system and two series below, 1ª divisão (série A) and 1ª divisão (série B), at the fifth level.

In more general terms the AF Coimbra currently organises district championships for football and futsal for men and women for all age groups including senior, junior, youth, beginners, infants, and schools.

== Notable clubs affiliated to AF Coimbra ==
- Académica de Coimbra
- União de Coimbra

== Divisions – 2013–14 season ==
The AF Coimbra runs the following divisions covering the fourth and fifth tiers of the Portuguese football league system.

=== Honra ===
- Ançã Futebol Clube
- Associação Académica de Coimbra
- Associação Atlética de Arganil
- Associação Desportiva de Lagares da Beira
- Associação Desportiva de Poiares
- Associação Educativa e Recreativa de Góis
- Clube Desportivo e Recreativo Penelense
- F.C. Oliveira do Hospital
- União de Coimbra
- Febres Sport Clube
- Grupo Desportivo Pampilhosense
- Grupo Recreativo O Vigor da Mocidade
- Real Clube Brasfemes
- Touring Clube da Praia de Mira
- União Clube Eirense
- União Desportiva da Tocha

=== 1ª divisão – série A ===
- Associação Desportiva de São Mamede
- Associação Desportiva e Cultural da Adémia
- Associação Desportiva e Cultural de S. Pedro de Alva
- Clube Académico das Gândaras - Recreativo Cultural Social
- Clube Condeixa Associação Cultural e Desportiva
- Clube Desportivo Lousanense
- Clube Recreativo Agrário Desportivo de Lamas
- Grupo Desportivo dos Moínhos
- Mocidade Futebol Clube

=== 1ª divisão – série B ===
- Académica O.A.F. B
- Associação Cultural Desportiva e Solidariedade de Vinha da Raínha
- Clube de Futebol Marialvas
- Esperança Atlético Clube
- Futebol Clube de S. Silvestre
- Grupo Desportivo Cova-Gala
- Grupo Desportivo de Sepins
- Grupo Desportivo Os Águias
- Sporting Clube Ribeirense

=== Historic champions ===
Year	Champions
1922/23	Académica
1923/24	Académica
1924/25	Académica
1925/26	União de Coimbra
1926/27	União de Coimbra
1927/28	Académica
1928/29	União de Coimbra
1929/30	União de Coimbra
1930/31	União de Coimbra
1931/32	União de Coimbra
1932/33	Académica
1933/34	Académica
1934/35	Académica

Year	Champions
1935/36	Académica
1936/37	Académica
1937/38	Académica
1938/39	Académica
1939/40	Académica
1940/41	Académica
1941/42	Académica
1942/43	Académica
1943/44	Académica
1944/45	Académica
1945/46	Académica
1946/47	União de Coimbra

Titles

- Académica – 18
- União de Coimbra – 7

== See also ==
- Portuguese football competitions
- List of football clubs in Portugal
