= Carapinheira =

- Civil parish
- Location in Portugal
- Coordinates: 40.209°N 8.653°W
- Country: Portugal
- Region: Centro
- Intermunic. comm.: Região de Coimbra
- District: Coimbra
- Municipality: Montemor-o-Velho

Area
  - Total: 15.90 km^{2} (6.14 sq mi)

Population (2011)
  - Total: 2,898
  - Density: 182.3/km^{2} (472.1/sq mi)
- Time zone: UTC+00:00 (WET)
  - Summer (DST): UTC+01:00 (WEST)

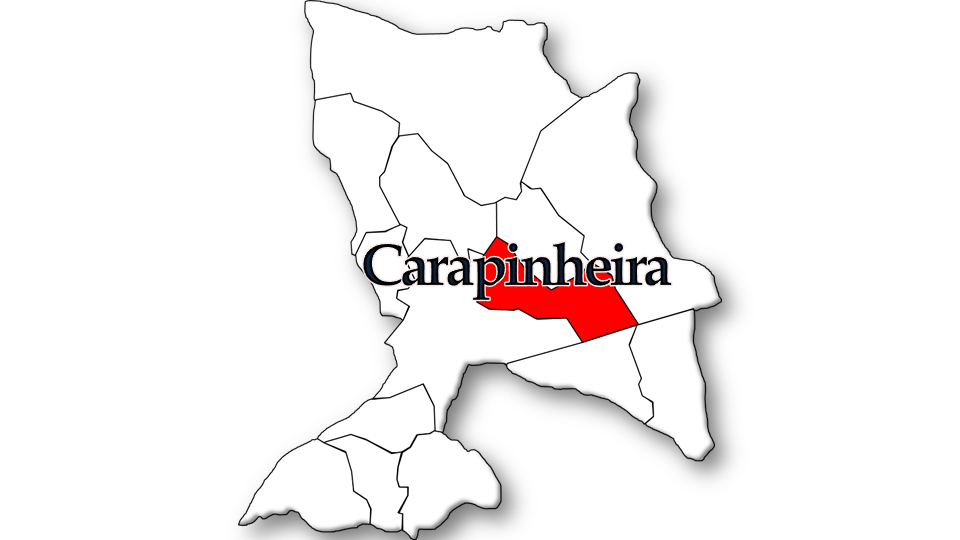
Carapinheira is located in the municipality of Montemor-o-Velho

Carapinheira is a town in Portugal. The population in 2011 was 2,898, in an area of 15.90 km².

At 40°12'9"N 8°38'1"W, there is a 120 metres tall guyed mast used for a mediumwave transmitter working on 630 kHz.
