= Portuguese football league system =

Leagues bound together hierarchically by promotion and relegation

The Portuguese football league system consists of several leagues bound together hierarchically by promotion and relegation. Reserve teams are allowed to compete in the main league system, as is the case with most of Europe. However, they are not allowed to compete in the same tier as their senior team, thus no reserve team has ever competed in Portugal's top flight, the Primeira Liga.

== Men's league system ==
The Portuguese men's football league system consists of four national divisions and up to four district leagues (depending on the district).

=== National leagues ===
All four national divisions provide access to the Portuguese Cup. The first two leagues are operated by the Portuguese Professional Football League, and they also guarantee participation in the Portuguese League Cup. Lastly, the third and fourth divisions are divided into two and four leagues respectively and are the only divisions operated by the Portuguese Football Federation. The federation announced the creation of Liga 3 (League 3) for 2021–22.

Level	League(s)/Division(s)			
1	Liga Portugal; 18 clubs			
	↓↑ 2 clubs + 1 club play-off			
2	Liga Portugal 2; 18 clubs			
	↓↑ 2 clubs + 1 club play-off			
3	Liga 3; 20 clubs divided into 2 groups			
3	Serie A 10 clubs		Serie B 10 clubs	
	↓↑ 4 clubs			
4	Campeonato de Portugal; 56 clubs divided into 4 groups			
4	Serie A 14 clubs	Serie B 14 clubs	Serie C 14 clubs	Serie D 14 clubs
	↓↑ 20 clubs			

=== District leagues ===
District leagues are operated by 22 District Associations: 18 from each district, plus 1 from Madeira Islands, and 3 from Azores Islands (western, central and eastern groups). The winner of each district league is promoted to the fourth national tier, the Campeonato de Portugal. Moreover, all district leagues provide access to their correspondent district cup, and the winner of the district cup, along with the second-placed team in the district league, is allowed to participate in the next season's Portuguese Cup. The bottom tier of each association is open to any new club or reserve team based on that district.

District Association	Level 5	Level 6	Level 7	Level 8
Porto FA 168 clubs	Decathlon Pro-League; 18 clubs	Elite Division; 32 clubs (Series 1 and 2)	Division of Honour; 48 clubs (Series 1, 2 and 3)	First Division; 70 clubs (Series 1, 2, 3, 4 and 5)
Braga FA 132 clubs	Pro-National; 18 clubs	Division of Honour; 32 clubs (Series A and B)	First Division; 82 clubs (Series A, B, C, D, E and F)	
Lisbon FA 96 clubs	First Division; 16 clubs	Second Division; 32 clubs (Series 1 and 2)	Third Division; 48 clubs (Series 1, 2 and 3)	
Aveiro FA 83 clubs	SABSEG Championship; 18 clubs	First Division; 28 clubs (Series North and South)	Second Division; 37 clubs (Series North, Center and South)	
Coimbra FA 46 clubs	Elite Division; 14 clubs	Division of Honour 14 clubs	Second Division 18 clubs	
Beja FA 46 clubs	First Division 12 clubs	Second Division 29 clubs (Series A, B and C)		
Viseu FA 44 clubs	Division of Honour 16 clubs	First Division 28 clubs (Series North, Center and South)		
Santarém FA 41 clubs	First Division 16 clubs	Second Division 25 clubs (Series A and B)		
Leiria FA 39 clubs	Lizsport Championship 16 clubs	First Division 23 clubs (Series A and B)		
Viana do Castelo FA 34 clubs	First Division 16 clubs	Second Division 18 clubs		
Setúbal FA 32 clubs	First Division 16 clubs	Second Division 16 clubs		
Évora FA 32 clubs	Elite Division 10 clubs	AFE League 22 clubs (Series A and B)		
Algarve FA 31 clubs	First Division 12 clubs	Second Division 19 clubs (Series Barlavento and Sotavento)		
Madeira FA 25 clubs	Division of Honour 12 clubs	First Division 13 clubs		
Guarda FA 22 clubs	First Division 14 clubs	Second Division 8 clubs		
Angra do Heroísmo FA 11 clubs + 10 clubs	Azores Championship 10 clubs	Graciosa Championship 6 clubs São Jorge Championship 3 clubs Terceira Championship 2 clubs		
Ponta Delgada FA 10 clubs + 10 clubs	Azores Championship 10 clubs	São Miguel Championship 10 clubs		
Horta FA 5 clubs + 10 clubs	Azores Championship 10 clubs	Horta Championship 5 clubs		
Vila Real FA 19 clubs	Division of Honour 19 clubs			
Bragança FA 10 clubs	Division of Honour 10 clubs			
Castelo Branco FA 9 clubs	Imotroféu League 9 clubs			
Portalegre FA 6 clubs	Maxfinance Interior League 6 clubs			

== Women's league system ==
The Portuguese women's football league system consists of four national divisions and no district leagues. All divisions provide access to the Women's Portuguese Cup and are operated by the Portuguese Football Federation. The second and third divisions are divided in series by geographical proximity.

Level	League(s)/Division(s)											
1	Campeonato Nacional de Futebol Feminino; 10 clubs											
	↓↑ 1 club + 2 clubs play-off											
2	Campeonato Nacional de Futebol Feminino II Divisão; 12 clubs divided into 2 groups											
2	Serie North; 6 clubs						Serie South; 6 clubs					
	↓↑ 1 clubs + 2 clubs play-off											
3	Campeonato Nacional de Futebol Feminino III Divisão; 12 clubs divided into 2 groups											
3	Serie North; 6 clubs						Serie South; 6 clubs					
	↓↑ 2 clubs + 1 clubs play-off											
4	Campeonato Nacional de Futebol Feminino IV Divisão; 70 clubs divided into 12 groups											
4	Serie A 6 clubs	Serie B 6 clubs	Serie C 6 clubs	Serie D 6 clubs	Serie E 6 clubs	Serie F 6 clubs	Serie G 6 clubs	Serie H 6 clubs	Serie I 6 clubs	Serie J 6 clubs	Serie L 5 clubs	Serie M 5 clubs

== See also ==
- List of association football competitions § Portugal
- Portuguese football competitions
