= 2019–20 Taça de Portugal =

Taça de Portugal Placard

Tournament details
- Country: Portugal
- Dates: 1 September 2019 – 1 August 2020
- Teams: 144

Final positions
- Champions: Porto (17th title)
- Runners-up: Benfica

Tournament statistics
- Matches played: 166
- Goals scored: 469 (2.83 per match)
- Top goal scorer(s): Stevy Okitokandjo (6 goals)

The 2019–20 Taça de Portugal (also known as Taça de Portugal Placard for sponsorship reasons) was the 80th edition of the Taça de Portugal, the premier knockout competition in Portuguese football. A total of 144 clubs entered this edition, including teams from the top three tiers of the Portuguese football league system (Note: Reserve or B teams are not eligible to participate.) and representatives of the fourth-tier District leagues and cups. This was the first season to allow a fourth substitution during extra time.

The competition began on 1 September 2019 with the first-round matches and was scheduled to conclude on 24 May 2020 with the final at the Estádio Nacional in Oeiras, between top-tier sides Benfica and Porto. However, due to the COVID-19 pandemic in Portugal, the final was postponed to 1 August 2020 and was played instead at the Estádio Cidade de Coimbra in Coimbra, behind closed doors. Porto beat Benfica 2–1 to win their 17th title in the competition and secure the club's eighth double.

Primeira Liga side Sporting CP were the defending champions, but they were eliminated by third-tier side Alverca in the third round.

== Format ==
Round	Clubs remaining	Clubs involved	Winners from previous round	New entries this round	Leagues entering at this round
First round	144	110	none	110	Campeonato de Portugal (3rd): 68 teams District Football Associations (4th): 42 teams
Second round	110	92	55+21	16	LigaPro (2nd): 16 teams
Third round	64	64	46	18	Primeira Liga (1st): 18 teams
Fourth round	32	32	32	none	none
Fifth round	16	16	16	none	none
Quarter-finals	8	8	8	none	none
Semi-finals	4	4	4	none	none
Final	2	2	2	none	none

== Teams ==
A total of 144 teams will compete in the 2019–20 Taça de Portugal: 18 teams from Primeira Liga, 16 teams from the LigaPro, 68 teams from the Campeonato de Portugal and 42 teams from the District championships and cups. (Note: Reserve teams are not allowed to compete in cups. For this reason, Benfica B and Porto B, who play in LigaPro, Braga B, Marítimo B, Vitória de Guimarães B and Chaves Satélite, who play in Campeonato de Portugal, do not compete in this tournament.)

=== Primeira Liga ===
- Belenenses SAD
- Benfica
- Braga
- Moreirense
- Porto
- Rio Ave
- Sporting CP
- Vitória de Guimarães
- Paços de Ferreira
- Famalicão
- Gil Vicente
- Aves
- Marítimo
- Santa Clara
- Portimonense
- Boavista
- Vitória de Setúbal
- Tondela

=== LigaPro ===
- Académica
- Académico de Viseu
- Casa Pia
- Chaves
- Cova da Piedade
- Estoril
- Farense
- Feirense
- Leixões
- Mafra
- Nacional
- Oliveirense
- Penafiel
- Sp. Covilhã
- Varzim
- Vilafranquense

=== Campeonato de Portugal ===
Series A

- AD Oliveirense
- Berço
- Bragança
- Câmara de Lobos
- Cerveira
- Fafe
- Maria da Fonte
- Merelinense
- Mirandela
- Montalegre
- Pedras Salgadas
- São Martinho
- União da Madeira
- Vizela

Series B

- Amarante
- Arouca
- Canelas 2010
- Castro Daire
- Coimbrões
- Espinho
- Felgueiras 1932
- Ginásio Figueirense
- Gondomar
- Leça
- Lusitânia Lourosa
- Lusitano Vildemoinhos
- Paredes
- Pedras Rubras
- Sanjoanense
- Trofense
- Valadares Gaia
- Vila Real

Series C

- Águeda
- Anadia
- Beira-Mar
- Benfica Castelo Branco
- Caldas
- Condeixa
- Fátima
- Fontinhas
- Ideal
- Marinhense
- Oleiros
- Oliveira do Hospital
- Praiense
- Sertanense
- Torreense
- União de Leiria
- União de Santarém
- Vitória de Sernache

Series D

- 1º de Dezembro
- Alverca
- Aljustrelense
- Amora
- Armacenenses
- Esperança de Lagos
- Fabril Barreiro
- Louletano
- Loures
- Lusitano de Évora
- Olhanense
- Olímpico Montijo
- Oriental
- Pinhalnovense
- Real
- Sacavenense
- Sintra Football
- Sintrense

=== District Championships ===
Algarve FA

- Moncarapachense (1st)
- Ferreiras (CW)

Angra do Heroísmo FA

- Velense (2nd)
- Lusitânia dos Açores (3rd)

Aveiro FA

- Bustelo (2nd)
- São João de Ver (CW)

Beja FA

- Penedo Gordo (2nd)
- Praia Milfontes (CW)

Braga FA

- Prado (2nd)
- Pevidém (CW)

Bragança FA

- Carção (2nd)
- Rebordelo (CR)

Castelo Branco FA

- Vila Velha de Ródão (3rd)
- Águias do Moradal (CR)

Coimbra FA

- Ançã (3rd)
- Pampilhosense (4th)

Évora FA

- Estrela Vendas Novas (2nd)
- Juventude Évora (CW)

Guarda FA

- Manteigas (2nd)
- Vila Cortês (CW)

Horta FA

- Fayal (1st)

Leiria FA

- G.R. Amigos da Paz (2nd)
- Portomosense (3rd)

Lisbon FA

- Pêro Pinheiro (CW)
- Coutada (CR)

Madeira FA

- Porto da Cruz (CW)

Ponta Delgada FA

- São Roque (1st)
- Rabo de Peixe (CR)

Portalegre FA

- Eléctrico (2nd)
- Crato (CR)

Porto FA

- Rebordosa (3rd)
- Vilarinho (CW)

Santarém FA

- Coruchense (2nd)
- União Almeirim (3rd)

Setúbal FA

- Alcochetense (2nd)
- Vasco da Gama Sines (3rd)

Viana do Castelo FA

- Atlético dos Arcos (2nd)
- Ponte da Barca (CR)

Vila Real FA

- Régua (2nd)
- Vila Pouca de Aguiar (CR)

Viseu FA

- Mortágua (2nd)
- Ferreira de Aves (CW)

Note: 1st/2nd/3rd/4th: final placing in championship; CW/CR: Cup winner or runner-up

== Schedule ==
All draws are held at the Portuguese Football Federation (FPF) headquarters in Oeiras. Match kick-off times are in WET (UTC±0) from the fourth round to the semi-finals, and in WEST (UTC+1) during the rest of the competition.

Round	Draw date	Date(s)	Fixtures	Teams	Prize money
First round	8 August 2019	1 September 2019	55	144 → 110	TBD
Second round	12 September 2019	29 September 2019	46	110 → 64	TBD
Third round	2 October 2019	20 October 2019	32	64 → 32	TBD
Fourth round	28 October 2019	24 November 2019	16	32 → 16	TBD
Fifth round	26 November 2019	17–19 December 2019	8	16 → 8	TBD
Quarter-finals	23 December 2019	14–16 January 2020	4	8 → 4	TBD
Semi-finals	23 December 2019	5 February 2020 (1st leg); 12 February 2020 (2nd leg)	4	4 → 2	TBD
Final	23 December 2019	1 August 2020	1	2 → 1	TBD

== First round ==
Times are WEST (UTC+1) (local times, if different, are in parentheses).

8 September 2019 Serie A	Merelinense (CP)	0–0 (a.e.t.) (5–4 p)	(D) Ponte da Barca	Merelim
17:00				Stadium: Estádio João Soares Vieira

8 September 2019 Serie A	Mirandela (CP)	2–0	(D) Atlético dos Arcos	Mirandela
17:00	César Antunes 10'; Rafael Amoroso 77'			Stadium: Estádio São Sebastião

8 September 2019 Serie A	Prado (D)	1–2	(D) Carção	Vila de Prado, Vila Verde
17:00	Bruno Silva 43'		Diego Oliveira 1'; Gabriel Galana 72'	Stadium: Complexo Desportivo do Faial

8 September 2019 Serie A	Pedras Salgadas (CP)	3–1	(D) Vila Pouca de Aguiar	Pedras Salgadas
17:00	Pedro Silva 45', 53'; Rui Faria 60' (o.g.)		Miguel Teixeira 70' (pen.)	Stadium: Estádio da Portelinha

8 September 2019 Serie A	Fafe (CP)	3–0	(D) Rebordelo	Fafe
17:00	Rúben Marques 11', 17'; Jussane 90'			Stadium: Parque Municipal dos Desportos de Fafe

8 September 2019 Serie A	Montalegre (CP)	1–0	(CP) Cerveira	Montalegre
17:00	Lio 39'			Stadium: Campo Dr. Diogo Alves Vaz Pereira

8 September 2019 Serie A	Maria da Fonte (CP)	3–0	(CP) Bragança	Póvoa de Lanhoso
17:00	Telmo Fernandes 13' (pen.); João Antunes 25'; Bruno Silva 83'			Stadium: Estádio dos Moinhos Novos

7 September 2019 Serie B	Pevidém (D)	1–3	(CP) Berço	Pevidém
16:00	Vítor Hugo 64'		Marcelo Barros 19', 48'; Mota 53'	Stadium: Parque de Jogos Albano Martins Coelho Lima

7 September 2019 Serie B	Câmara de Lobos (CP)	0–4	(CP) Felgueiras 1932	Câmara de Lobos
16:00			Pedro Ribeiro 5', 20'; Rúben Alves 44'; Pedro Marques 63'	Stadium: Estádio Municipal de Câmara de Lobos

8 September 2019 Serie B	União da Madeira (CP)	1–0	(CP) Vila Real	Ribeira Brava
17:00	Zé Domingos 35'			Stadium: Centro Desportivo da Madeira

8 September 2019 Serie B	Amarante (CP)	2–1	(CP) Trofense	Amarante
17:00	Alex Silva 90'; Adélcio Varela 90+2'		Bruno Almeida 35'	Stadium: Estádio Municipal de Amarante

8 September 2019 Serie B	Pedras Rubras (CP)	0–3	(CP) Vizela	Pedras Rubras
17:00			Gonçalo Pimenta 37' (o.g.); João Pedro 40'; Francis Cann 45+6'	Stadium: Estádio Municipal de Pedras Rubras

8 September 2019 Serie B	Vilarinho (D)	0–2	(CP) AD Oliveirense	Vilarinho
17:00			Sandro Fonseca 31'; Luisinho 90+1'	Stadium: Estádio Municipal de Vilarinho

8 September 2019 Serie B	Porto da Cruz (D)	0–3	(CP) São Martinho	Machico
17:00			Belarmino Tavares 18'; Zé Pedro 21'; Tiago Valente 84'	Stadium: Estádio Municipal de Machico

7 September 2019 Serie C	São João de Ver (D)	0–3	(CP) Sanjoanense	São João de Ver
17:00			Elisson 10'; Edson Khumalo 45+2', 70'	Stadium: Estádio Sp. Clube São João de Ver

8 September 2019 Serie C	Arouca (CP)	5–0	(D) Rebordosa	Arouca
17:00	Thales 20' (pen.); Fábio Fortes 23', 90+1'; André Salvador 35'; Henrique 85'			Stadium: Estádio Municipal de Arouca

8 September 2019 Serie C	Espinho (CP)	2–0	(CP) Castro Daire	Fiães
17:00	Dante 25'; Nathan 58'			Stadium: Estádio do Bolhão

8 September 2019 Serie C	Paredes (CP)	0–0 (a.e.t.) (2–4 p)	(CP) Lusitânia	Paredes
17:00				Stadium: Cidade Desportiva De Paredes

8 September 2019 Serie C	Gondomar (CP)	3–1	(CP) Leça	Gondomar
17:00	Edelino Ié 2', 90+5'; Fausto Lourenço 13' (pen.)		Nelsinho 68' (pen.)	Stadium: Estádio de São Miguel

8 September 2019 Serie C	Canelas 2010 (CP)	3–1	(CP) Valadares Gaia	Canelas
17:00	Francisco Sousa 37', 84'; Leo Rodrigues 78'		João Sousa 90+4'	Stadium: Estádio do Canelas Gaia Futebol Clube

8 September 2019 Serie C	Coimbrões (CP)	4–1	(D) Régua	Santa Marinha
17:00	Clever Jansen 2', 12'; Alex Tanque 14'; Guilherme Gomes 18'		Quinzinho 70'	Stadium: Parque Silva Matos

7 September 2019 Serie D	Manteigas (D)	1–3	(D) Bustelo	Manteigas
17:00	Tinga 73'		Diogo Silva 21'; Joel Santos 50', 56'	Stadium: Estádio Municipal Eng.º Barjona de Freitas

8 September 2019 Serie D	Mortágua (D)	4–2	(CP) Anadia	Mortágua
17:00	Rui Raínho 16' (o.g.); João Rodrigues 27'; Stefan Almeida 42'; João David 66'		Marcelo 45+3', 85'	Stadium: Campo da Gandarada

8 September 2019 Serie D	Vila Cortês (D)	0–3	(CP) Ginásio Figueirense	Guarda
17:00			Mavuba 19'; Kojo 71', 79'	Stadium: Estádio Municipal da Guarda

8 September 2019 Serie D	Condeixa (CP)	0–0 (a.e.t.) (5–4 p)	(CP) Oliveira do Hospital	Condeixa-a-Nova
17:00				Stadium: Estádio Municipal de Condeixa-a-Nova

8 September 2019 Serie D	Beira-Mar (CP)	6–0	(D) Pampilhosense	Aveiro
17:00	Moussa Cissé 23'; Caminata 48'; Fábio Vieira 60' (pen.); Artur 71'; Abbeyson 77'; Fatadjo 90+3'			Stadium: Estádio Municipal de Aveiro

8 September 2019 Serie D	Lusitano Vildemoinhos (CP)	3–2	(D) Ançã	Vildemoinhos, Viseu
17:00	Diogo Braz 18', 73'; Raphael Almeida 42'		André Gonçalo 55'; Pepperoni 80'	Stadium: Estádio dos Trambelos

8 September 2019 Serie D	Águeda (CP)	5–0	(D) Ferreira de Aves	Águeda
17:00	Ivan Fidalgo 5', 7'; Neto 63'; Emanuel 68'; Gabriel Mejía 90'			Stadium: Estádio Municipal de Águeda

8 September 2019 Serie E	Vila Velha de Ródão (D)	0–5	(CP) Caldas	Vila Velha de Ródão
17:00			Hugo Neto 21' (pen.), 65' (pen.), 83'; Vítor Rodrigues 39'; Ruca 81'	Stadium: Estádio Municipal de Vila Velha de Rodão

8 September 2019 Serie E	Marinhense (CP)	0–0 (a.e.t.) (1–4 p)	(CP) Fátima	Marinha Grande
17:00				Stadium: Estádio Municipal da Marinha Grande

8 September 2019 Serie E	Águias do Moradal (D)	2–4	(CP) Vitória de Sernache	Estreito, Oleiros
17:00	Paulo Andrade 33'; Quinzinho 90+1'		Williams 4', 44'; Sérgio Nogueira 37'; João Salvado 61' (o.g.)	Stadium: Estádio do Ventoso

8 September 2019 Serie E	Sertanense (CP)	1–1 (a.e.t.) (5–3 p)	(CP) Oleiros	Sertã
17:00	Saná Gomes 82'		Jimmy 38'	Stadium: Campo de Jogos Dr. Marques dos Santos

8 September 2019 Serie E	União de Leiria (CP)	5–0	(D) Crato	Leiria
17:00	Dénis Marandici 12'; Laércio Morais 14'; Danny Choi 38', 61'; Shpitalny 79'			Stadium: Estádio Dr. Magalhães Pessoa

8 September 2019 Serie E	Eléctrico (D)	0–7	(CP) Benfica Castelo Branco	Ponte de Sor
17:00			Okitokandjo 18', 55', 68', 90+2'; Diogo Motty 22'; Diogo Silva 39'; Daniel Rodriguez 63'	Stadium: Estádio Municipal de Ponte de Sor

8 September 2019 Serie E	Amigos da Paz (D)	2–3	(D) Portomosense	Pousos, Leiria
17:00	Pedro Domingues 8'; Dany Marques 82' (pen.)		Hugo Romana 37'; Kiko 47'; Afonso Feteiro 87'	Stadium: Campo da Charneca

7 September 2019 Serie F	Sintra Football (CP)	1–0	(CP) Loures	Oeiras
17:00	Marco Gomes 40'			Stadium: Estádio Municipal Mário Wilson

8 September 2019 Serie F	Sintrense (CP)	1–0 (a.e.t.)	(D) Coruchense	Sintra
17:00	Pedro Bonifácio 116'			Stadium: Estádio do Sport União Sintrense

8 September 2019 Serie F	União Almeirim (D)	2–3	(CP) União de Santarém	Almeirim
17:00	Filipe Pereira 16', 90+6'		Pedro Augusto 17', 51'; André Pires 58'	Stadium: Estádio D. Manuel de Mello

8 September 2019 Serie F	São Roque (D)	0–1	(CP) Torreense	São Roque
17:00			Rodrigo Vilela 90+2'	Stadium: Campo de Jogos de São Roque

8 September 2019 Serie F	Alverca (CP)	3–0	(CP) Sacavenense	Alverca do Ribatejo
17:00	Flávio Castro 45', 47'; Luan Silva 69'			Stadium: Complexo Desportivo FC Alverca

8 September 2019 Serie F	Pêro Pinheiro (D)	2–2 (a.e.t.) (4–2 p)	(CP) 1º de Dezembro	Pêro Pinheiro, Sintra
17:00	Miguel Pinto 86', 107'		Romário Carvalho 37'; Duarte Ferreira 100'	Stadium: Parque de Jogos Pardal Monteiro

8 September 2019 Serie F	Coutada (D)	2–0	(D) Fayal	Torres Vedras
17:00	Pedro Gomes 72'; Yordán Restrepo 90+4' (pen.)			Stadium: Estádio Manuel Marques

7 September 2019 Serie G	Lusitânia dos Açores (D)	1–2	(CP) Amora	Angra do Heroísmo
18:00 (10:30 UTC±0)	Leo Machado 48'		Joca Monteiro 32' (goal), 68' (pen.)	Stadium: Estádio João Paulo II

8 September 2019 Serie G	Praiense (CP)	4–0	(CP) Fabril Barreiro	Praia da Vitória
18:00 (10:30 UTC±0)	Paulo Teles 45' (pen.); Matheus Souza 54'; Cristiano Magina 63'; Márcio Augusto 73'			Stadium: Estádio Municipal da Praia da Vitória

8 September 2019 Serie G	Fontinhas (CP)	1–3	(CP) Pinhalnovense	Fontinhas
18:00 (10:30 UTC±0)	Jordanes Medeiros 28'		Diego Zaporo 25', 45+2'; Yuran Lopes 73'	Stadium: Campo Municipal Dr. Durval Monteiro

8 September 2019 Serie G	Rabo de Peixe (D)	1–0	(CP) Olímpico Montijo	Rabo de Peixe
17:00 (10:30 UTC±0)	Hugo Moniz 48'			Stadium: Campo de Jogos Bom Jesus

8 September 2019 Serie G	Real (CP)	4–1	(D) Estrela Vendas Novas	Queluz
17:00	David Dinamite 8'; Diogo David 45'; Augustus Nogueira 66' (o.g.); João Ventura 74' (pen.)		Cláudio Neves 90+3'	Stadium: Complexo Desportivo do Real SC

8 September 2019 Serie G	Oriental (CP)	2–0	(CP) Ideal	Lisbon
17:00	Nélson Landim 50', 65'			Stadium: Estádio Engenheiro Carlos Salema

15 September 2019 Serie G	Velense (D)	0–5	(D) Alcochetense	Velas
11:30 (10:30 UTC±0)			Filipe Paiva 39'; Luís Gaspar 65'; João Ismael 71'; Rui Társio 75', 83'	Stadium: Campo Municipal das Velas

7 September 2019 Serie H	Esperança de Lagos (CP)	1–0	(CP) Lusitano de Évora	Lagos
17:00	Zé Miguel 70' (pen.)			Stadium: Estádio Municipal de Lagos

8 September 2019 Serie H	Louletano (CP)	1–0	(D) Ferreiras	Faro
17:00	Érico Castro 90+2'			Stadium: Estádio Algarve

8 September 2019 Serie F	Mineiro Aljustrelense (CP)	3–2 (a.e.t.)	(D) Vasco da Gama Sines	Aljustrel
17:00	Joel Costa 88', 116'; Jorge Raposo 105'		Daniel Direito 44'; Márcio Madeira 109'	Stadium: Estádio Municipal de Aljustrel

8 September 2019 Serie H	Olhanense (CP)	1–0	(CP) Armacenenses	Olhão
17:00	Hassan 41'			Stadium: Estádio José Arcanjo

8 September 2019 Serie H	Penedo Gordo (D)	2–0	(D) Praia Milfontes	Penedo Gordo, Beja
17:00	Gonçalo Torrão 35', 56'			Stadium: Campo de Jogos Carolina Almodôvar Fernandes

8 September 2019 Serie H	Juventude Évora (D)	2–2 (a.e.t.) (6–7 p)	(D) Moncarapachense	Évora
17:00	Antony Pérez 42', 83'		Tiago Barros 40', 59'	Stadium: Estádio Sanches de Miranda

== Second round ==
Number of teams per tier entering this round
Primeira Liga	LigaPro	Campeonato de Portugal	District FAs	Total
18 / 18	16 / 16	55 / 68	21 / 42	110 / 144

Repechage

The following 21 first-round losing teams were selected to compete in the second round:

- Águias do Moradal (D)
- Anadia (D)
- Ançã (D)
- Atlético dos Arcos (D)
- Coruchense (D)
- Eléctrico (D)
- Fabril Barreiro (CP)
- Fontinhas (CP)
- Ideal (CP)
- Leça (CP)
- Loures (CP)
- Lusitânia dos Açores (D)
- Lusitano de Évora (CP)
- Marinhense (CP)
- Olímpico Montijo (CP)
- Pevidém (D)
- Prado (D)
- São João de Ver (D)
- Valadares Gaia (CP)
- Vasco da Gama Sines (D)
- Vila Pouca de Aguiar (D)

Fixtures

Times are WEST (UTC+1) (local times, if different, are in parentheses).

28 September 2019	Rabo de Peixe (D)	0–1	(II) Académico de Viseu	Ribeira Grande
14:00 (13:00 UTC±0)			Medina 90+5'	Stadium: Estádio Municipal da Ribeira Grande

28 September 2019	Berço (CP)	1–3	(II) Feirense	São Martinho de Sande, Guimarães
15:00	Welton 86'		Feliz 75'; Guilherme Ramos 88'; Kwame N´Sor 90+4'	Stadium: Complexo Desportivo D. Maria Teresa

28 September 2019	União da Madeira (CP)	1–2 (a.e.t.)	(CP) Fafe	Ribeira Brava
15:30	Sylla 66'		Rúben Marques 19' (pen.); Zé Oliveira 95'	Stadium: Centro Desportivo da Madeira

28 September 2019	Carção (D)	0–2	(II) Vilafranquense	Vimioso
15:30			Hinestroza 10'; Wilson Santos 45+2' (pen.)	Stadium: Estádio Municipal de Vimioso

29 September 2019	Condeixa (CP)	0–0 (a.e.t.) (5–4 p)	(D) Lusitânia dos Açores	Condeixa-a-Nova
11:00				Stadium: Estádio Municipal de Condeixa-a-Nova

29 September 2019	União de Santarém (CP)	1–2	(II) Farense	Santarém
14:00	Didi 34'		Fabrício 10' (pen.); Fábio Nunes 48'	Stadium: Campo Chã das Padeiras

29 September 2019	Portomosense (D)	0–3	(CP) Alverca	Porto de Mós
15:00			Ronaldo 8'; Alex Apolinário 65'; Andrezinho 72'	Stadium: Estádio Municipal de Porto de Mós

29 September 2019	Loures (CP)	2–2 (a.e.t.) (4–2 p)	(CP) Lusitano de Évora	Zambujal, Loures
11:00	Saldanha 75'; Forbs 97'		William Barbosa 89'; Kiko Viegas 120'	Stadium: Campo Conde Mendia

29 September 2019	Canelas 2010 (CP)	4–0	(D) Ançã	Canelas
15:00	Francisco Sousa 13'; Fábio Rola 42'; Baba Zakari 44'; Rafael Vaz 90'			Stadium: Estádio do Canelas Gaia Futebol Clube

29 September 2019	Coruchense (D)	0–4	(CP) Olímpico Montijo	Coruche
15:00			H. Roque 71', 81' (pen.); Rúben 83', 90+5'	Stadium: Estádio Municipal Prof. José Peseiro

29 September 2019	Coimbrões (CP)	3–1	(D) Prado	Santa Marinha
15:00	Pedro Tavares 27' (pen.); Ivo Lucas 90+1'; Rúben Gonçalo 90+6'		Éder 53' (pen.)	Stadium: Parque Silva Matos

29 September 2019	Amora (CP)	2–1	(D) São João de Ver	Amora
15:00	João Delgado 49'; Geraldo 82'		Alex Brandão 2'	Stadium: Estádio da Medideira

29 September 2019	Sintra Football (CP)	2–0	(CP) Amarante	Oeiras
15:00	André Soares 56'; Braudílio 89'			Stadium: Estádio Municipal Mário Wilson

29 September 2019	Moncarapachense (D)	0–1 (a.e.t.)	(CP) Sertanense	Moncarapacho
15:00			Doukouré 119'	Stadium: Estádio Dr. António João Eusébio

29 September 2019	Maria da Fonte (CP)	1–5	(CP) Pedras Salgadas	Póvoa de Lanhoso
15:00	Bruno Silva 45+5'		Chula 7' (pen.); Ruca 29' (pen.), 43' (pen.), 64' (pen.); Diogo Lopes 90'	Stadium: Estádio dos Moinhos Novos

29 September 2019	Fátima (CP)	4–0	(D) Coutada	Fátima
15:00	Coelho 28'; Carlos Daniel 34'; Sambú 50'; Bruno Alves 66' (pen.)			Stadium: Estádio Papa Francisco

29 September 2019	Gondomar (CP)	0–1	(CP) Valadares Gaia	Gondomar
15:00			George Ayine 20'	Stadium: Estádio de São Miguel

29 September 2019	São Martinho (CP)	0–0 (a.e.t.) (2–4 p)	(CP) Merelinense	São Martinho Campo
15:00				Stadium: Estádio Comendador Abílio Ferreira de Oliveira

29 September 2019	Benfica Castelo Branco (CP)	3–2	(CP) Olhanense	Castelo Branco
15:00	Okitokandjo 72'; Pedro Eira 80'; Rafa Pinto 88'		Hassan 14'; João Vasco 28'	Stadium: Estádio Municipal Vale do Romeiro

29 September 2019	AD Oliveirense (CP)	2–1 (a.e.t.)	(CP) Felgueiras 1932	Santa Maria de Oliveira, Vila Nova de Famalicão
15:00	Jimmy Ekua 83'; Nuno Pereira 97'		Rabiola 5' (pen.)	Stadium: Estádio da Ribes

29 September 2019	Beira-Mar (CP)	2–0	(D) Bustelo	Aveiro
15:00	Cissé 26'; Bernardo Santos 39'			Stadium: Estádio Municipal de Aveiro

29 September 2019	Pêro Pinheiro (D)	0–0 (a.e.t.) (3–4 p)	(CP) Vitória de Sernache	Pêro Pinheiro, Sintra
15:00				Stadium: Parque de Jogos Pardal Monteiro

29 September 2019	Sintrense (CP)	1–2 (a.e.t.)	(CP) Anadia	Sintra
15:00	Miguel Ângelo 89'		Pedro Santos 23', 105'	Stadium: Estádio do Sport União Sintrense

29 September 2019	Atlético dos Arcos (D)	0–2	(CP) Praiense	Arcos de Valdevez
15:00			João Peixoto 23'; Márcio Augusto 79'	Stadium: Estádio Municipal da Coutada

29 September 2019	Mineiro Aljustrelense (CP)	0–2	(II) Casa Pia	Aljustrel
15:00			Machado 10'; Kenidy 90+2'	Stadium: Estádio Municipal de Aljustrel

29 September 2019	Mirandela (CP)	1–2	(II) Chaves	Mirandela
15:00	Rafael Amoroso 61'		André Luís 21'; Wágner 65'	Stadium: Estádio São Sebastião

29 September 2019	Vila Pouca de Aguiar (D)	0–4	(II) Mafra	Vila Pouca de Aguiar
15:00			Ayongo 32', 62'; Flávio 85', 88'	Stadium: Complexo Desportivo de Vila Pouca de Aguiar

29 September 2019	Lusitânia (CP)	4–2 (a.e.t.)	(II) Sporting Covilhã	Lourosa
15:00	Poulson 3'; Goba Zakpa 94', 107'; Hélder Castro 119' (pen.)		Henrique 77' (o.g.); Mica 110'	Stadium: Estádio do Lusitânia F.C.

29 September 2019	Alcochetense (D)	0–4	(II) Leixões	Alcochete
15:00			Luís Silva 26', 49'; Júnior 33'; Tarzan 87'	Stadium: Estádio António Almeida Correia (Foni)

29 September 2019	Leça (CP)	0–0 (a.e.t.) (4–3 p)	(II) Oliveirense	Leça da Palmeira
15:00				Stadium: Estádio do Leça Futebol Clube

29 September 2019	Caldas (CP)	0–1	(II) Varzim	Caldas da Rainha
15:00			Leonardo 45' (pen.)	Stadium: Campo da Mata

29 September 2019	Mortágua (D)	2–3 (a.e.t.)	(II) Penafiel	Mortágua
15:00	Daniel Pinto 85'; Duda 117'		João Paulo 90+2'; Ronaldo 92'; Pires 113'	Stadium: Campo da Gandarada

29 September 2019	Lusitano Vildemoinhos (CP)	0–1	(II) Académica	Vildemoinhos, Viseu
15:00			Arghus 49'	Stadium: Estádio dos Trambelos

29 September 2019	Pinhalnovense (CP)	1–2	(II) Estoril	Pinhal Novo
15:00	João Bandeira 74'		Nicolas Careca 25'; André Franco 53' (pen.)	Stadium: Campo de Jogos Santos Jorge

29 September 2019	Eléctrico (D)	1–6	(CP) Arouca	Ponte de Sor
15:00	José Cruz 7'		Thales 3' (pen.); Valdu Té 14', 42'; Adílio 75'; Miguel Abreu 78'; André Salvador 90+3'	Stadium: Estádio Municipal de Ponte de Sor

29 September 2019	Esperança de Lagos (CP)	1–3	(D) Pevidém	Lagos
15:00	Kuiaté Lamine 69'		Venú 70', 79'; João Moreira 85'	Stadium: Estádio Municipal de Lagos

29 September 2019	Penedo Gordo (D)	0–1	(CP) Fabril Barreiro	Penedo Gordo, Beja
15:00			Balela 11'	Stadium: Campo de Jogos Carolina Almodôvar Fernandes

29 September 2019	Montalegre (CP)	0–1	(CP) Marinhense	Montalegre
15:00			Leandro 51' (pen.)	Stadium: Campo Dr. Diogo Alves Vaz Pereira

29 September 2019	Sanjoanense (CP)	1–0	(CP) Ideal	São João da Madeira
15:00			Rúben Pereira 90+3'	Stadium: Estádio Conde Dias Garcia

29 September 2019	Espinho (CP)	2–0	(II) Nacional	Fiães
15:00	João Ricardo 66'; Miguel Baptista 90+4' (pen.)			Stadium: Estádio do Bolhão

29 September 2019	Vizela (CP)	6–1	(CP) Fontinhas	Vizela
15:00	Fall 24', 76'; Cristian Castro 52'; Kiko Bondoso 54'; Francis Cann 65'; Diogo Ribeiro 82'		Jordanes Medeiros 84' (pen.)	Stadium: Estádio do FC Vizela

29 September 2019	Louletano (CP)	1–1 (a.e.t.) (4–2 p)	(CP) Ginásio Figueirense	Faro
15:00	Pedro Oliveira 73' (pen.)		Fábio Pina 63'	Stadium: Estádio Algarve

29 September 2019	União de Leiria (CP)	0–1	(CP) Real	Leiria
15:00			Márcio Meira 83'	Stadium: Estádio Dr. Magalhães Pessoa

29 September 2019	Águias do Moradal (D)	1–0	(CP) Torreense	Estreito, Oleiros
16:00	Luis Fortunato 88'			Stadium: Estádio do Ventoso

29 September 2019	Vasco da Gama Sines (D)	0–4	(II) Cova da Piedade	Sines
16:45	Sami 2'; Yuhao Liu 45+3'; Gustavo Souza 72'; Edinho 75'			Stadium: Estádio Municipal de Sines

29 September 2019	Águeda (CP)	4–1	(CP) Oriental	Águeda
19:45	Gabriel Mejía 12'; Juninho 20', 52'; Manel Cordeiro 90+4'		Luís Lucas 90+2'	Stadium: Estádio Municipal de Águeda

== Third round ==
Number of teams per tier entering this round
Primeira Liga	LigaPro	Campeonato de Portugal	District FAs	Total
18 / 18	13 / 16	31 / 68	2 / 42	64 / 144

Times are WEST (UTC+1).

17 October 2019	Alverca (CP)	2–0	(I) Sporting CP	Alverca do Ribatejo
20:45	Alex Apolinário 10'; Luan Silva 55'			Stadium: Complexo Desportivo FC Alverca

18 October 2019	Cova da Piedade (II)	0–4	(I) Benfica	Cova da Piedade
20:30		Report	Pizzi 45+2', 50'; Carlos Vinícius 64', 90+2'	Stadium: Estádio Municipal José Martins Vieira; Referee: António Nobre (Leiria)

19 October 2019	Condeixa (CP)	0–1	(I) Rio Ave	Condeixa-a-Nova
11:15			Nuno Santos 75'	Stadium: Estádio Municipal de Condeixa-a-Nova

19 October 2019	Sintra Football (CP)	1–1 (a.e.t.) (4–3 p)	(I) Vitória de Guimarães	Oeiras
14:00	Élvis Fernandes 70' (pen.)		Davidson 85'	Stadium: Estádio Municipal Mário Wilson

19 October 2019	Louletano (CP)	1–2 (a.e.t.)	(I) Paços de Ferreira	Faro
15:00	Érico Castro 34'		Hélder Ferreira 21'; Dadashov 105'	Stadium: Estádio Algarve

19 October 2019	Fabril Barreiro (CP)	1–3	(I) Moreirense	Barreiro
15:00	Celestino 85'		Pedro Nuno 24', 68'; Fábio Abreu 79'	Stadium: Estádio Alfredo da Silva

19 October 2019	Pevidém (D)	0–2	(I) Belenenses SAD	Pevidém
15:00			Robinho 44'; Licá 72'	Stadium: Parque de Jogos Albano Martins Coelho Lima

19 October 2019	Amora (CP)	0–1	(CP) Sanjoanense	Amora
15:00			Menaour Belkheir 67'	Stadium: Estádio da Medideira

19 October 2019	Espinho (CP)	2–1	(II) Vilafranquense	Fiães
15:00	João Pinto 83'; Miguel Baptista 90+4' (pen.)		Kassio 37'	Stadium: Estádio do Bolhão

19 October 2019	Académico de Viseu (II)	3–1	(CP) Real	Viseu
15:00	Jean Patric 9', 29'; Fernando Ferreira 23'		San Martín 72'	Stadium: Estádio do Fontelo

19 October 2019	Penafiel (II)	0–2	(I) Gil Vicente	Penafiel
16:00			Sandro Lima 35' (pen.); Claude Gonçalves 76'	Stadium: Estádio Municipal 25 de Abril

19 October 2019	Feirense (II)	3–0	(I) Tondela	Santa Maria da Feira
17:00	Fábio Espinho 2'; Ença Fati 45+1'; Christian 69'			Stadium: Estádio Marcolino de Castro

19 October 2019	Farense (II)	5–2	(I) Aves	Faro
17:00	Fabrício 14', 37'; Cássio 45+2'; Dźwigała 54' (o.g.); Fabrício Isidoro 64'		Welinton Jr. 47', 88'	Stadium: Estádio de São Luís

19 October 2019	Académica (II)	2–1	(I) Portimonense	Coimbra
18:00	Ki 53'; Djoussé 90'		Jackson Martínez 88'	Stadium: Estádio Cidade de Coimbra

19 October 2019	Coimbrões (CP)	0–5	(I) Porto	Pedroso
18:45			Luis Díaz 6', 68'; Soares 8'; Mbemba 12'; Fábio Silva 81'	Stadium: Estádio Municipal Jorge Sampaio

19 October 2019	Leça (CP)	1–3	(I) Braga	Leça da Palmeira
20:45	Adilson Silva 85'		Wilson Eduardo 25', 54'; Ricardo Horta 42'	Stadium: Estádio do Leça Futebol Clube

20 October 2019	Águias do Moradal (D)	0–5	(I) Vitória de Setúbal	Estreito, Oleiros
14:00			Ghilas 1', 5', 44'; Carlinhos 15'; Zequinha 59'	Stadium: Estádio do Ventoso

20 October 2019	Mafra (II)	1–0	(CP) Fafe	Mafra
15:00	Rúben Freitas 120'			Stadium: Estádio Municipal de Mafra

20 October 2019	Varzim (II)	1–0	(II) Estoril	Póvoa de Varzim
15:00	Ruiz 68' (pen.)			Stadium: Estádio do Varzim SC

20 October 2019	Lusitânia (CP)	1–1 (a.e.t.) (5–6 p)	(I) Famalicão	Lourosa
15:00	Goba Zakpa 90'		Anderson 70'	Stadium: Estádio do Lusitânia F.C.

20 October 2019	AD Oliveirense (CP)	0–3	(I) Santa Clara	Santa Maria de Oliveira, Vila Nova de Famalicão
15:00			Thiago Santana 27'; Bruno Lamas 67' (pen.); João Afonso 80'	Stadium: Estádio da Ribes

20 October 2019	Vitória de Sernache (CP)	0–0 (a.e.t.) (4–5 p)	(CP) Sertanense	Cernache do Bonjardim
15:00				Stadium: Estádio Municipal Nuno Álvares Pereira

20 October 2019	Marinhense (CP)	1–0	(CP) Fátima	Marinha Grande
15:00	Ednilson Furtado 10'			Stadium: Estádio Municipal da Marinha Grande

20 October 2019	Loures (CP)	4–2 (a.e.t.)	(CP) Benfica Castelo Branco	Zambujal, Loures
15:00	Sapo 42'; Hugo Machado 48', 102'; Batatinha 109'		Okitokandjo 24'; Diogo Silva 68'	Stadium: Campo Conde Mendia

20 October 2019	Olímpico Montijo (CP)	0–1	(CP) Anadia	Montijo
15:00			Nádson 86'	Stadium: Campo da Liberdade

20 October 2019	Casa Pia (II)	1–3	(CP) Vizela	Lisbon
15:00	Wilson Kenidy 87'		Francis Okoli 20'; Samu 51'; Diogo Ribeiro 80'	Stadium: Estádio Pina Manique

20 October 2019	Arouca (CP)	1–0	(CP) Merelinense	Arouca
15:00	Valdu Té 65'			Stadium: Estádio Municipal de Arouca

20 October 2019	Pedras Salgadas (CP)	1–0	(CP) Águeda	Pedras Salgadas
15:00	Marcelo Vilela 67'			Stadium: Estádio da Portelinha

20 October 2019	Chaves (II)	2–1 (a.e.t.)	(I) Boavista	Chaves
16:00	André Luís 102'; Medina 120+2'		Bueno 117'	Stadium: Estádio Municipal Eng. Manuel Branco Teixeira

20 October 2019	Valadares Gaia (CP)	0–0 (a.e.t.) (10–11 p)	(CP) Canelas 2010	Valadares
16:30				Stadium: Complexo Desportivo de Valadares

20 October 2019	Beira-Mar (CP)	2–2 (a.e.t.) (5–4 p)	(I) Marítimo	Aveiro
17:00	João Nogueira 15'; Cissé 90+3'		Maeda 69'; Zainadine 83'	Stadium: Estádio Municipal de Aveiro

20 October 2019	Leixões (II)	4–2	(CP) Praiense	Matosinhos
19:45	Júnior 20' (pen.); Pedro Pinto 53'; André Claro 62'; Braga 81'		Filipe Andrade 7'; Matheus Souza 90+2'	Stadium: Estádio do Mar

== Fourth round ==
Number of teams per tier entering this round
Primeira Liga	LigaPro	Campeonato de Portugal	District FAs	Total
11 / 18	8 / 16	13 / 68	0 / 42	32 / 144

Times are WET (UTC±0).

22 November 2019	Leixões (II)	1–4	(I) Santa Clara	Matosinhos
17:15	Pedro Pinto 86'		Zé Manuel 32'; Osama Rashid 44'; Anderson Carvalho 49', 80'	Stadium: Estádio do Mar

22 November 2019	Varzim (II)	1–0	(CP) Loures	Póvoa de Varzim
20:45	Levi Lumeka 90+5'			Stadium: Estádio do Varzim SC

23 November 2019	Sertanense (CP)	2–1 (a.e.t.)	(II) Farense	Sertã
14:00	Marquinhos 89'; Own goal 93'		Fabrício Simões 31'	Stadium: Campo de Jogos Dr. Marques dos Santos

23 November 2019	Académico de Viseu (II)	1–0	(II) Feirense	Viseu
15:00	Latyr Fall 72'			Stadium: Estádio do Fontelo

24 November 2019	Espinho (CP)	3–2 (a.e.t.)	(CP) Arouca	Fiães
15:00	Vieirinha 21'; João Ferreira 36'; Bruno Valente 113'		Benny Silvano 67'; Sheriff Deo 90+5'	Stadium: Estádio do Bolhão

23 November 2019	Famalicão (I)	1–0	(II) Académica	Vila Nova de Famalicão
16:45	Toni Martínez 45'			Stadium: Estádio Municipal 22 de Junho

23 November 2019	Braga (I)	1–0	(I) Gil Vicente	Braga
18:30	Ricardo Horta 8'			Stadium: Estádio Municipal de Braga

23 November 2019	Vizela (CP)	1–2	(I) Benfica	Vizela
20:45	Samu 6'		Raúl de Tomás 70'; Carlos Vinícius 86'	Stadium: Estádio do FC Vizela

24 November 2019	Moreirense (I)	1–3	(II) Mafra	Moreira de Cónegos
15:00				Stadium: Parque de Jogos Comendador Joaquim de Almeida Freitas

24 November 2019	Sintra Football (CP)	0–2	(CP) Marinhense	Oeiras
15:00				Stadium: Estádio Municipal Mário Wilson

24 November 2019	Paços de Ferreira (I)	1–0	(CP) Sanjoanense	Paços de Ferreira
15:00				Stadium: Estádio da Mata Real

24 November 2019	Pedras Salgadas (CP)	0–0 (6–7 p)	(CP) Canelas 2010	Pedras Salgadas
15:00				Stadium: Estádio da Portelinha

24 November 2019	Anadia (CP)	2–1	(CP) Beira-Mar	Anadia
15:00				Stadium: Estádio Municipal Engº Sílvio Henriques Cerveira

24 November 2019	Rio Ave (I)	1–0	(CP) Alverca	Vila do Conde
15:30				Stadium: Estádio dos Arcos

24 November 2019	Porto (I)	4–0	(I) Vitória de Setúbal	Porto
17:30				Stadium: Estádio do Dragão

24 November 2019	Chaves (II)	1–0	(I) Belenenses SAD	Chaves
20:00				Stadium: Estádio Municipal Eng. Manuel Branco Teixeira

== Fifth round ==
Number of teams per tier entering this round
Primeira Liga	LigaPro	Campeonato de Portugal	District FAs	Total
7 / 18	4 / 16	5 / 68	0 / 42	16 / 144

Times are WET (UTC±0).

17 December 2019	Académico Viseu (II)	1–0	(II) Chaves	Viseu
14:15	João Mário 68'			Stadium: Estádio do Fontelo; Referee: António Nobre

17 December 2019	Varzim (II)	2–1 (a.e.t.)	(CP) Anadia	Póvoa de Varzim
17:45	Leonardo Ruiz 77'; Baba Sow 98'		Nadson 90+5'	Stadium: Estádio do Varzim SC; Referee: João Bento

17 December 2019	Marinhense (CP)	0–2	(I) Rio Ave	Marinha Grande
20:30			Tarantini 33'; Ronan 90'	Stadium: Estádio Municipal da Marinha Grande; Referee: Rui Oliveira

18 December 2019	Sertanense (CP)	0–1	(CP) Canelas 2010	Sertã
14:15			Baba Zakaria 16'	Stadium: Campo de Jogos Dr. Marques dos Santos

18 December 2019	Paços de Ferreira (I)	3–0	(CP) Espinho	Paços de Ferreira
18:45	Pedrinho 45+3'; Murilo 79', 90+6'			Stadium: Estádio da Mata Real; Referee: Cláudio Pereira

18 December 2019	Benfica (I)	2–1	(I) Braga	Lisbon
20:45	Pizzi 19'; Carlos Vinícius 62'		Ferro 14' (o.g.)	Stadium: Estádio da Luz; Referee: Artur Soares Dias

19 December 2019	Porto (I)	1–0	(I) Santa Clara	Porto
19:15	Nakajima 29'			Stadium: Estádio do Dragão; Referee: Fábio Veríssimo

19 December 2019	Famalicão (I)	3–0	(II) Mafra	Vila Nova de Famalicão
20:30	P. Gonçalves 52'; D. Gonçalves 60'; Martínez 29'			Stadium: Estádio Municipal 22 de Junho; Referee: Luis Godinho

== Quarter-finals ==
Number of teams per tier entering this round
Primeira Liga	LigaPro	Campeonato de Portugal	District FAs	Total
5 / 18	2 / 16	1 / 68	0 / 42	8 / 144

Times are WET (UTC±0).

14 January 2020	Porto (I)	2–1	(II) Varzim	Porto
18:00	Soares 28'; Marcano 41'		Hugo 36'	Stadium: Estádio do Dragão; Referee: Rui Costa

14 January 2020	Benfica (I)	3–2	(I) Rio Ave	Lisbon
21:00	Cervi 13'; Seferovic 64', 71'		Piazon 4'; Taremi 30'	Stadium: Estádio da Luz; Referee: Artur Soares Dias

15 January 2020	Paços de Ferreira (I)	0–1	(I) Famalicão	Paços de Ferreira
20:00			Diogo Gonçalves 81'	Stadium: Estádio da Mata Real; Referee: Luís Godinho

16 January 2020	Académico de Viseu (II)	1–0	(CP) Canelas 2010	Viseu
20:00	Carter 90+1'			Stadium: Estádio do Fontelo; Referee: Hélder Malheiro

== Semi-finals ==
Number of teams per tier entering this round
Primeira Liga	LigaPro	Campeonato de Portugal	District FAs	Total
3 / 18	1 / 16	0 / 68	0 / 42	4 / 144

Times are WET (UTC±0).

4 February 2020
20:45

Académico de Viseu (II)	1–1	(I) Porto
João Mário 71'		Zé Luís 59'

Estádio do Fontelo, Viseu
Referee: João Pinheiro
12 February 2020
20:45

Porto (I)	3–0	(II) Académico de Viseu
Telles 19' (pen.); Zé Luís 64'; Oliveira 72'

Estádio do Dragão, Porto
Referee: Manuel Oliveira

Porto won 4–1 on aggregate.

4 February 2020
19:15

Benfica (I)	3–2	(I) Famalicão
Pizzi 53' (pen.); Silva 78'; Gabriel 90+5'		Gonçalves 60'; Martínez 73'

Estádio da Luz, Lisbon
Referee: Hugo Miguel
11 February 2020
20:45

Famalicão (I)	1–1	(I) Benfica
Martínez 78'		Pizzi 24'

Estádio Municipal 22 de Junho, Vila Nova de Famalicão
Referee: Jorge Sousa

Benfica won 4–3 on aggregate.

== Final ==
The final was scheduled to take place on 24 May 2020 at the Estádio Nacional in Oeiras. However, on 10 March, the FPF announced that it would be postponed due to the coronavirus pandemic in Portugal, following the recommendations of the Portuguese government. On 28 April, Portuguese Prime Minister António Costa met with the presidents of the "Big Three" clubs in Portugal (Benfica, Sporting CP and Porto), the President of the FPF, and the President of the Liga Portuguesa de Futebol Profissional, to discuss the conditions of the return of football competitions in Portugal. Two days later, with the consent of the Ministry of Health, Costa approved the return of the final, with the match being played behind closed doors.

On 2 July, it was announced that the final would be played on 1 August at the Estádio Cidade de Coimbra in Coimbra, behind closed doors.

1 August 2020
20:45 WEST

Benfica	1–2	Porto
Vinícius 84' (pen.)		Mbemba 47', 58'

Estádio Cidade de Coimbra, Coimbra
Attendance: 0 (Note: The final was played behind closed doors due to the COVID-19 pandemic in Portugal.)
Referee: Artur Soares Dias

== Bracket ==
Fourth round
23 November 2019
Vizela	1
Benfica	2
23 November 2019
Braga	1
Gil Vicente	0
24 November 2019
Sintra Football	0
Marinhense	2
24 November 2019
Rio Ave	1
Alverca	0
24 November 2019
Paços de Ferreira	1
Sanjoanense	0
24 November 2019
Espinho (a.e.t.)	3
Arouca	2
23 November 2019
Famalicão	1
Académica	0
24 November 2019
Moreirense	1
Mafra	3
23 November 2019
Académico de Viseu	1
Feirense	0
24 November 2019
Chaves	1
Belenenses SAD	0
23 November 2019
Sertanense (a.e.t.)	2
Farense	1
24 November 2019
Pedras Salgadas	0 (6)
Canelas 2010 (p)	0 (7)
24 November 2019
Porto	4
Vitória de Setúbal	0
22 November 2019
Leixões	1
Santa Clara	4
22 November 2019
Varzim	1
Loures	0
24 November 2019
Anadia	2
Beira-Mar	1

Fifth round
18 December 2019
Benfica	2
Braga	1
17 December 2019
Marinhense	0
Rio Ave	2
18 December 2019
Paços de Ferreira	3
Espinho	0
19 December 2019
Famalicão	3
Mafra	0
17 December 2019
Académico Viseu	1
Chaves	0
18 December 2019
Sertanense	0
Canelas 2010	1
19 December 2019
Porto	1
Santa Clara	0
17 December 2019
Varzim (a.e.t.)	2
Anadia	1

Quarter-finals
14 January 2020
Benfica	3
Rio Ave	2
15 January 2020
Paços de Ferreira	0
Famalicão	1
16 January 2020
Académico de Viseu	1
Canelas 2010	0
14 January 2020
Porto	2
Varzim	1

Semi-finals
4 & 11 February 2020
Benfica	3	1
Famalicão	2	1
4 & 12 February 2020
Académico de Viseu	0	1
Porto	3	1

Final
1 August 2020
Benfica	1
Porto	2
