= Fidalgo (disambiguation) =

A fidalgo was a traditional title in the Portuguese nobility or gentry, related to the Spanish cognate hidalgo.

Fidalgo may also refer to:

== People ==
- Alfonso Fidalgo (born 1969), Spanish paralympic athlete
- Álvaro Fidalgo (born 1997), Mexico international footballer
- Agustín Fidalgo (born 1996), Argentine footballer
- Ivan Fidalgo (born 1992), Portuguese footballer
- João Fidalgo (born 1986), Portuguese volleyball player
- José Fidalgo (born 1979), Portuguese model and actor
- Maria Paula Fidalgo, Brazilian comedian and actress
- Matilde Fidalgo (born 1994), Portuguese footballer
- Miguel Fidalgo (born 1982), better known as just Fidalgo, Portuguese footballer
- Salvador Fidalgo (1756–1803), Spanish explorer of the Pacific Northwest

== Places ==
- Fidalgo, Washington, an unincorporated community
- Fidalgo Island, an island in Skagit County, Washington, United States

== Other uses ==
- Fidalgo (sternwheeler), a 1920 Puget Sound steam scow
- Fidalgo River, a river of Piauí, Brazil
