= 2009 UEFA European Under-21 Championship qualification Group 3 =

Qualifying competition

The teams competing in group 3 of the 2009 UEFA European Under-21 Championships qualifying competition are Bulgaria, England, Montenegro, Portugal, and Republic of Ireland.

== Standings ==
Team	Pld	W	D	L	GF	GA	GD	Pts
England	8	7	1	0	17	1	+16	22
Portugal	8	4	2	2	13	7	+6	14
Montenegro	8	2	2	4	5	12	−7	8
Bulgaria	8	2	1	5	4	9	−5	7
Republic of Ireland	8	1	2	5	4	14	−10	5

Key: Pts Points, Pld Matches played, W Won, D Drawn, L Lost, GF Goals for, GA Goals against, GD Goal Difference

== Matches ==
5 June 2007
17:00 CEST

Bulgaria	1 – 2	Montenegro
Simović 90+1' (o.g.)	Report	Vukčević 50'; Jovetić 66'

Balgarska Armiya, Sofia
Referee: Petteri Kari (Finland)

7 September 2007
20:45 CEST

Republic of Ireland	0 – 2	Portugal
	Report	Machado 7'; Veloso 54'

Turners Cross, Cork
Referee: Manuel Gräfe (Germany)
7 September 2007
20:45 CEST

Montenegro	0 – 3	England
	Report	Onuoha 6'; Agbonlahor 10'; Surman 90'

Podgorica City Stadium, Podgorica
Attendance: 9,000
Referee: Mechalis Germanakos (Greece)

11 September 2007
18:00 CEST

Bulgaria	0 – 2	England
	Report	Huddlestone 25'; Noble 32'

Balgarska Armiya, Sofia
Attendance: 1,000
Referee: Fredy Fautrel (France)
11 September 2007
22:00 CEST

Portugal	4 – 0	Montenegro
Moreira 18'; Nuno Coelho 53'; Fernandes 66', 89'	Report

CTFD PortoGaia, Portugal
Referee: Jan Jilek (Czech Republic)

12 October 2007
17:00 CEST

Bulgaria	1 – 0	Portugal
Domovchiyski 43' (pen.)	Report

Vasil Levski National Stadium, Sofia
Referee: Meir Levi (Israel)
12 October 2007
20:45 CEST

England	1 – 0	Montenegro
Derbyshire 20'	Report

Walkers Stadium, Leicester
Attendance: 20,022
Referee: Anders Hermansen (Denmark)

16 October 2007
19:00 CEST

Montenegro	1 – 2	Portugal
Moreira 34' (o.g.)	Report	Celestino 76'; Targino 80'

Podgorica City Stadium, Podgorica
Referee: Joseph Attard (Malta)
16 October 2007
21:00 CEST

Republic of Ireland	0 – 3	England
	Report	Noble 10', 17'; Milner 26'

Turners Cross, Cork
Attendance: 6,500
Referee: Andrea De Marco (Italy)

16 November 2007
15:30 CEST

Montenegro	1 – 0	Republic of Ireland
Vujović 18'	Report

Podgorica City Stadium, Podgorica
Referee: Fariz Yusifov (Azerbaijan)
16 November 2007
19:00 CEST

England	2 – 0	Bulgaria
Agbonlahor 41'; Milner 82' (pen.)	Report

stadium:mk, Milton Keynes
Attendance: 20,222
Referee: Luc Wouters (Belgium)

20 November 2007
20:00 CEST

Republic of Ireland	1 – 0	Bulgaria
O'Toole 90+3'	Report

Lissywoollen Stadium, Athlone
Referee: Jérôme Laperrière (Switzerland)
20 November 2007
22:00 CEST

Portugal	1 – 1	England
Machado 3' (pen.)	Report	Johnson 49'

Estádio Municipal de Águeda, Águeda
Attendance: 5,468
Referee: István Vad (Hungary)

5 February 2008
20:45 CEST

England	3 – 0	Republic of Ireland
O'Halloran 59' (o.g.); Milner 68'; Walcott 78'	Report

St Mary's Stadium, Southampton
Attendance: 31,473
Referee: Jouni Hyytiä (Finland)

25 March 2008
20:30 CEST

Republic of Ireland	1 – 1	Montenegro
Keogh 72'	Report	Bojović 68'

Terryland Park, Galway
Referee: Yuriy Moseychuk (Ukraine)
26 March 2008
18:15 CEST

Portugal	2 – 0	Bulgaria
Moreira 65'; Saleiro 68'	Report

Estádio D. Afonso Henriques, Guimarães
Referee: Matej Jug (Slovenia)

5 September 2008
17:30 CEST

Bulgaria	2 – 0	Republic of Ireland
Kurdov 45'; Tsvetanov 77'	Report

Georgi Asparuhov Stadium, Sofia
Referee: Marco Borg (Malta)
5 September 2008
20:45 CEST

England	2 – 0	Portugal
Milner 44' (pen.); Agbonlahor 63'	Report

Wembley Stadium, London
Attendance: 20,000
Referee: Gianluca Rocchi (Italy)

9 September 2008
16:00 UTC+2

Montenegro	0 – 0	Bulgaria
	Report

Stadion Gradski, Nikšić
Referee: Svein-Erik Edvartsen (Norway)
9 September 2008
18:00 UTC+1

Portugal	2 – 2	Republic of Ireland
Vaz Tê 38'; Fernandes 45+1'	Report	Garvan 50', 65'

Estádio dos Barreiros, Funchal
Referee: Jérome Efong Nzolo (Belgium)

== Goalscorers ==
Pos	Player	Country	Goals
1	James Milner	England	4
2	Gabriel Agbonlahor	England	3
2	Manuel Fernandes	Portugal	3
2	Mark Noble	England	3
5	Owen Garvan	Republic of Ireland	2
5	Paulo Machado	Portugal	2
5	João Moreira	Portugal	2

1 goal

- Bulgaria: Valeri Domovchiyski, Atanas Kurdov, Momchil Tsvetanov
- England: Matthew Derbyshire, Tom Huddlestone, Adam Johnson, Nedum Onuoha, Andrew Surman, Theo Walcott
- Republic of Ireland: Andy Keogh, John-Joe O'Toole
- Montenegro: Mijuško Bojović, Stevan Jovetić, Goran Vujović, Simon Vukčević
- Portugal: Nuno Coelho, Carlos Saleiro, Celestino, Tiago Targino, Ricardo Vaz Tê, Miguel Veloso

Own goals

- Republic of Ireland: Stephen O'Halloran
- Montenegro: Janko Simović
- Portugal: João Moreira
