= 2022–23 U.D. Oliveirense season =

U.D. Oliveirense
2022–23 season
- President: Horácio Bastos
- Head coach: Fábio Pereira
- Stadium: Estádio Carlos Osório
- Liga Portugal 2: 12th
- Taça de Portugal: Pre-season
- Taça da Liga: Pre-season
- All statistics correct as of 4 February 2023.

The 2022–23 season is the 100th season in the history of U.D. Oliveirense and their first season back in the second division of Portuguese football. The club are participating in the Liga Portugal 2, the Taça de Portugal, and the Taça da Liga. The season covers the period from 1 July 2022 to 30 June 2023.

== Players ==
As of 3 February 2023

Note: Flags indicate national team as defined under FIFA eligibility rules; some limited exceptions apply. Players may hold more than one non-FIFA nationality.

No.	Pos.	Nation	Player
1	GK	GBS	Rui Dabó
2	DF	POR	Gonçalo Pimenta
3	DF	BRA	Volnei Feltes
4	DF	BRA	Iago Reis
5	MF	BRA	Filipe Alves
8	MF	POR	Pedro Graça
9	FW	AUS	Anthony Carter
10	MF	POR	Duarte Duarte
11	FW	JPN	Kazuyoshi Miura
13	GK	POR	Nuno Silva
17	FW	POR	José Marcelo
18	DF	POR	Vasco Gadelho
21	MF	POR	Jaime Pinto

No.	Pos.	Nation	Player
23	FW	BRA	Michel
24	DF	POR	Rodrigo Borges
27	MF	FRA	Ibrahima Guirassy
28	DF	BRA	Raniel
33	MF	BRA	Michel
34	DF	POR	Pedro Marques
35	MF	POR	Serginho
43	FW	POR	Zé Leite
50	MF	POR	Nuno Valente
68	DF	POR	Miguel Maga
70	FW	POR	Zé Pedro
87	GK	POR	Ricardo Ribeiro
88	DF	BRA	Kazu
97	FW	BRA	Jonata

== Pre-season and friendlies ==
Win Draw Loss Fixtures

6 July 2022 Friendly	Oliveirense (Portugal)	2–6	(Portugal) Braga	Oliveira de Azeméis
11:00 WEST (UTC+1)	João Marcelo 37'; Jaiminho 64' (pen.)		Vasco Gadelho 22' (o.g.); Schürrle 24'; Dinis Rodrigues 44'; Vitinha 61', 77', 88'	Stadium: Estádio Carlos Osório

9 July 2022 Friendly	Oliveirense (Portugal)	0–1	(Portugal) Paços de Ferreira	Oliveira de Azeméis
10:30 WEST (UTC+1)			Djaló 20'	Stadium: Estádio Carlos Osório

19 July 2022 Friendly	Oliveirense (Portugal)	2–1	(Portugal) Vizela	Figueira da Foz
10:30 WEST (UTC+1)	Obi; Guirassy		Zohi

27 July 2022 Friendly	Rio Ave (Portugal)	3–1	(Portugal) Oliveirense	Vila do Conde
10:00 WEST (UTC+1)	Pereira (pen.)		Pisco

== Competitions ==
=== Overall record ===
Competition	First match	Last match	Starting round	Final position	Record							
Competition	First match	Last match	Starting round	Final position	Pld	W	D	L	GF	GA	GD	Win %
Liga Portugal 2	August 2022	May 2023	Matchday 1		19	6	7	6	27	28	−1	31.58
Taça de Portugal	2 October 2022	15 October 2022	Second round	Third round	2	1	0	1	5	3	+2	50.00
Taça da Liga	19 November 2022	10 December 2022	Group stage	Group stage	4	0	2	2	2	6	−4	0.00
Total					25	7	9	9	34	37	−3	28.00

Last updated: 4 February 2023
Source: Soccerway

=== Liga Portugal 2 ===
==== League table ====
Pos	Team	Pld	W	D	L	GF	GA	GD	Pts
8	Feirense	34	11	13	10	43	37	+6	46 (Note: Vilafranquense are ahead of Feirense on head-to-head points: Vilafranquense 1–0 Feirense, Feirense 1–2 Vilafranquense.)
9	Torreense	34	13	5	16	38	41	−3	44
10	Oliveirense	34	11	10	13	51	50	+1	43
11	Tondela	34	8	16	10	35	35	0	40
12	Penafiel	34	9	12	13	36	47	−11	39 (Note: Penafiel are ahead of Nacional on head-to-head points: Penafiel 3–0 Nacional, Nacional 1–1 Pennafiel.)

Updated to match(es) played on 28 May 2023. Source: Liga Portugal 2
Rules for classification: 1) Points; 2) Head-to-head points; 3) Head-to-head goal difference; 4) Head-to-head away goals scored; 5) Goal difference; 6) Matches won; 7) Goals scored; 8) Play-off.

==== Results summary ====
Overall								Home						Away					
Pld	W	D	L	GF	GA	GD	Pts	W	D	L	GF	GA	GD	W	D	L	GF	GA	GD
0	0	0	0	0	0	0	0	0	0	0	0	0	0	0	0	0	0	0	0

Last updated: August 2022.
Source: Liga Portugal

==== Results by round ====
Round	1
Ground	
Result	
Position	

Updated to match(es) played on August 2022. Source: Liga Portugal
A = Away; H = Home; W = Win; D = Draw; L = Loss

==== Matches ====
The league fixtures were announced on 5 July 2022.
