= Daisuke Araki (footballer) =

Japanese footballer (born 2000)

Personal information
- Date of birth: 5 August 2000 (age 26)
- Place of birth: Osaka, Japan
- Height: 1.64 m (5 ft 5 in)
- Position: Midfielder

Youth career
- 2008–2018: Tokyo Verdy
- 2019: Marítimo

Senior career*
Years	Team	Apps	(Gls)
2019–2020	Zimbru Chișinău	1	(0)
2020	Cesarense	2	(0)
2020–2022	Casa Corval	34	(16)
2023	Alcains	13	(6)
2023–2025	Pevidém		
2025–2026	São João de Ver	4	(0)
2026	Vianense	14	(1)
- * Club domestic league appearances and goals as of 31 May 2026

Daisuke Araki (荒木 大輔, Araki Daisuke; born 5 August 2000) is a Japanese footballer.

== Career statistics ==
=== Club ===
As of 27 August 2023.

Appearances and goals by club, season and competition
Club	Season	League			National Cup		Continental		Other		Total	
Club	Season	Division	Apps	Goals	Apps	Goals	Apps	Goals	Apps	Goals	Apps	Goals
Zimbru	2019	Divizia Națională	1	0	0	0	0	0	0	0	1	0
Cesarense	2019–20	Aveiro Elite Division	2	0	0	0	–		1 (Note: Appearances in the Aveiro Elite Division Cup)	0	3	0
Casa Corval	2020–21	Évora Elite Division	8	6	0	0	–		0	0	8	6
Casa Corval	2021–22	Évora Elite Division	26	10	0	0	–		0	0	26	10
Casa Corval	Total		34	16	0	0	0	0	0	0	34	16
Alcains	2022–23	Campeonato de Portugal	13	6	0	0	–		0	0	13	6
Pevidém	2023–24	Campeonato de Portugal	1	0	0	0	–		0	0	1	0
Career total			51	22	0	0	0	0	1	0	52	22
