= Pedro Almeida =

Pedro Almeida may refer to:

- Pedro Almeida (equestrian) (born 1993), Brazilian Olympic equestrian
- Pedro Almeida (footballer, born 1994), Portuguese footballer who plays as a defender
- Pedro Almeida (footballer, born 1993), Portuguese footballer who plays as a defender
