= Filipe Sousa =

Filipe Sousa may refer to:

- Filipe Sousa (politician) (born 1964), Portuguese politician
- Filipe Sousa (footballer) (born 1991), Portuguese footballer
