= João Ricardo =

João Ricardo may refer to:

- João Ricardo (footballer, born 1970), João Ricardo Pereira Batalha dos Santos Ferreira, Angolan football goalkeeper
- João Ricardo (footballer, born 1988), João Ricardo Riedi, Brazilian football goalkeeper
- João Ricardo (footballer, born 1991), João Ricardo Pinto da Silva, Portuguese football midfielder
