= Bruno Alves (disambiguation) =

Bruno Alves (born 1981) is a Portuguese football sporting director and former centre-back.

Bruno Alves may also refer to:

- Bruno Alves (footballer, born 1990), Portuguese football midfielder for Santiago Mascotelos
- Bruno Alves (footballer, born 1991), Brazilian football centre-back for Cuiabá
- Bruno Alves (footballer, born 1992), Brazilian football forward for Paysandu
- Bruno Alves (footballer, born 2005), Brazilian football defender for Norwich City
