= R.D. Águeda =

Association football club in Portugal

Águeda
- Full name: Recreio Desportivo de Águeda
- Founded: 10 April 1924; 101 years ago
- Ground: Estádio Municipal de Águeda, Águeda
- Capacity: 10,000
- Manager: André Ribeiro
- Website: www.recreiodeagueda.pt
Home colours	Away colours

Recreio Desportivo de Águeda, commonly known as Recreio de Águeda, is a Portuguese sports club from Águeda, Aveiro. The club was founded on 10 April 1924. It currently plays at the Estádio Municipal de Águeda, which also hosts to the club's reserve and youth teams.

The club's football team reached the Primeira Liga in the 1983–84 season, where it competed for a single season before being relegated.

== Current squad ==
As of 2 November 2019

Note: Flags indicate national team as defined under FIFA eligibility rules; some limited exceptions apply. Players may hold more than one non-FIFA nationality.

No.	Pos.	Nation	Player
1	GK	BRA	Rafa Santos
2	DF	CMR	Louis Souffo
4	MF	POR	Marcelo Moreira
5	DF	POR	João Simões
6	DF	POR	Paulo Moreira
8	MF	BRA	Ataíde
9	FW	BRA	Neto
10	MF	BRA	Juninho
11	FW	GNB	Drogba Camará
13	GK	BRA	Gonçalo Batista
17	MF	CMR	Emmanuel Mbarga

No.	Pos.	Nation	Player
19	FW	POR	Pedro Sá
20	MF	POR	Diogo Gouveia
21	DF	POR	Marcelo Dias
23	DF	BRA	Emanuel
25	FW	BRA	Jullyan
27	DF	POR	Pedro Almeida
28	FW	POR	Ivan Fidalgo
37	FW	POR	Raul Almeida
42	FW	COL	Gabriel Mejía
77	DF	POR	Miguel Campos
85	DF	POR	Diogo Castro

== League and Cup history ==
Season		Pos.	Pl.	W	D	L	GF	GA	GD	P	Portuguese Cup	Notes
1966–67	AF Aveiro	1	-	-	-	-	-	-	-	-		
1973–74	AF Aveiro	1	-	-	-	-	-	-	-	-		
1981–82	2D	3	34	21	2	7	54	23	31	44		
1983–84	1D	15	30	7	5	18	25	55	-30	19		Relegated
1988–89	2D	3	34	14	16	4	41	19	22	44		
1989–90	2D	6	34	15	8	11	43	36	7	38		
1990–91	2D	18	38	10	5	23	41	73	-32	25	Sixth round	Relegated
1991–92	2DB	10	34	11	12	11	30	36	-6	34		
1992–93	2DB	6	34	14	12	8	37	28	9	40		
1993–94	2DB	12	34	10	13	11	35	35	0	33		
1994–95	2DB	18	34	0	13	21	23	62	-39	13		Relegated
1995–96	3D	6	34	16	8	10	63	41	22	56		
1996–97	3D	15	34	10	12	12	43	39	4	42		Relegated
2005–06	AF Aveiro	1	-	-	-	-	-	-	-	-		Promoted
2006–07	3D	13	28	10	2	16	29	38	-9	32		Relegated
2007–08	AF Aveiro	1	-	-	-	-	-	-	-	-		Promoted
2008–09	3D	9	26	10	4	12	29	41	-12	34		Relegated
2011–12	AF Aveiro	4	-	-	-	-	-	-	-	-		
2012–13	AF Aveiro	6	-	-	-	-	-	-	-	-		

== Honours ==
- II Division – Zona Centro
  - Winners (1): 1982–83
  - Runners-up (1): 1985–86
- AF Aveiro First Division
  - Winners (5): 1966–67, 1973–74, 2005–06, 2007–08, 2015–16
- AF Aveiro Cup
  - Winners (3): 1947–48, 2014–15, 2015–16
- AF Aveiro SuperCup
  - Winners (3): 2007–08, 2014–15, 2015–16
  - Runners-up (1): 2013–14
