= Filipe Sousa (footballer) =

Portuguese footballer

Personal information
- Full name: Filipe Campelos de Sousa
- Date of birth: 1 September 1991 (age 35)
- Place of birth: Guimarães, Portugal
- Height: 1.78 m (5 ft 10 in)
- Position: Midfielder

Youth career
- 2002–2004: Fair-Play
- 2004–2010: Vitória

Senior career*
Years	Team	Apps	(Gls)
2010–2011	Amarante	22	(2)
2011–2012	Lousada	14	(0)
2012	Ribeirão	1	(0)
2012–2015	Desportivo Aves	17	(0)
2015	Freamunde	1	(0)
2016–2017	AD Oliveirense	11	(0)
2017–2018	Mondinense	19	(0)
2018–2023	Pevidém	59	(1)
- * Club domestic league appearances and goals as of 4 September 2021

Filipe Campelos de Sousa (born 1 September 1991) is a Portuguese former footballer as a midfielder, who works as a nutritionist at Manchester United in the Premier League

== Career ==
Sousa was born in Guimarães. On 29 July 2012, he made his professional debut with Aves in a 2012–13 Taça da Liga match against Trofense.
