= Stevy Okitokandjo =

Dutch footballer (born 1994)

Personal information
- Date of birth: 18 June 1994 (age 32)
- Place of birth: Haarlem, Netherlands
- Height: 1.85 m (6 ft 1 in)
- Position: Forward

Team information
- Current team: Crossing Schaerbeek
- Number: 29

Senior career*
Years	Team	Apps	(Gls)
–2014	Gent	0	(0)
2014–2016	Mechelen	0	(0)
2014–2015	→ Roeselare (loan)	25	(5)
2015–2016	→ Patro Eisden (loan)	23	(4)
2016–2017	Virton	27	(4)
2017–2018	Leixões	17	(0)
2018	→ Olhanense (loan)	11	(6)
2018–2019	Olhanense	24	(13)
2019–2020	Castelo Branco	27	(16)
2020–2022	Mafra	55	(12)
2022–2023	Trofense	28	(4)
2023–2024	Puerto Cabello	19	(5)
2024	Forlì	7	(4)
2024–2025	ASD Ilvamaddalena 1903	16	(4)
2025–	Crossing Schaerbeek	14	(2)
- * Club domestic league appearances and goals as of 28 June 2026

Stevy Okitokandjo (born 18 June 1994) is a Dutch professional footballer who plays as a forward for Belgian club Crossing Schaerbeek.

== Career ==
Born in Haarlem, North Holland, to a family of Congolese descent, Okitokandjo played in his youth for Olympia Haarlem. At the age of 8, he was accepted into the academy of Ajax, but his family moved to Belgium, telling him at first that it was only on holiday; he was then not allowed to join high level youth academies due his parents' emphasis on education. When he was 17, his club Dender went bankrupt and he moved to Gent.

Okitokandjo did not make a top-flight appearance in Belgium for Gent or for Mechelen, and was loaned to Roeselare and Patro Eisden in the second tier. He trialled with Beerschot in 2016 but on the day that he was due to sign, he suffered a car crash, which he alleged to be due to sabotage by an envious neighbour.

After Beerschot postponed signing him, Okitokandjo signed for third-tier Virton, where he was scouted by Leixões after scoring twice and assisting another goal in 20 minutes; the Portuguese second division club were in Belgium to watch one of his teammates. Struggling with the new language and climate, he was loaned to Olhanense in the league below. After trials at FC Eindhoven and for Slovak club Trenčín, he joined Olhanense permanently.

Olhanense's main financial backer died, putting the club into financial turmoil and making Okitokandjo sleep in a room in the stadium for four months rather than in the apartment he had been promised in his contract. He then moved to Castelo Branco in the same league. He was the top scorer in the 2019–20 Taça de Portugal with six goals, four of which in a 7–0 win at Eléctrico in the first round.

On 30 June 2020, Okitokandjo moved up a league to Mafra. He scored 7 goals in 27 games in his first season, including a penalty on his debut on 13 September in a 4–0 opening win at Cova da Piedade and two on 20 December as they came back to draw 2–2 at home to U.D. Oliveirense.

Okitokandjo moved to Trofense, also in the Portuguese second tier, on 9 July 2022. He scored on his debut on 6 August, as the season began with a 3–2 home win over Belenenses SAD.
