= Northern Light (sternwheeler) =

1898 steamboat in United States

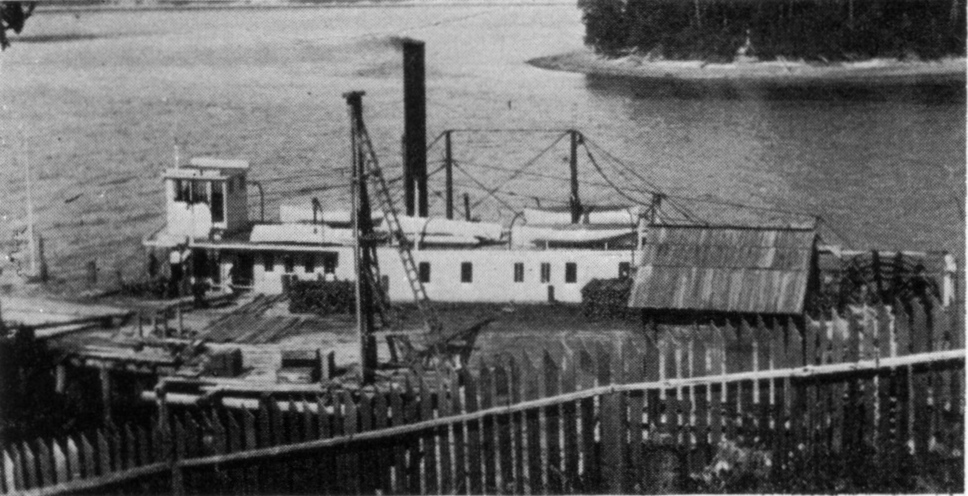
- Northern Light at a pier.

History
- Name: Northern Light
- Route: Puget Sound
- Completed: 1898, Seattle
- Out of service: 1920
- Identification: U.S. registry #130078
- Fate: Abandoned or wrecked.

General characteristics
- Tonnage: 265 gross, 147 registered
- Length: 119.8 ft (36.5 m)
- Beam: 22.9 ft (7.0 m)
- Depth: 4.1 ft (1.2 m) depth of hold
- Installed power: twin steam engines, horizontally mounted, 214 indicated horsepower
- Propulsion: sternwheel

Northern Light was a sternwheel steamboat of the Puget Sound Mosquito Fleet and was active in the early 1900s.

== Career ==
Northern Light was built in 1898 at Seattle. The vessel was assigned to routes on southern Puget Sound, including the Anderson Island run. Northern Light was abandoned in 1920. The engines were removed and installed in the sternwheeler Fidalgo.
