= Celestino (footballer) =

Cape Verdean footballer (born 1987)

Pedro Celestino
Personal information
- Full name: Pedro Celestino Silva Soares
- Date of birth: 2 January 1987 (age 39)
- Place of birth: Tarrafal, Cape Verde
- Height: 1.77 m (5 ft 10 in)
- Position: Midfielder

Youth career
- 1996–2003: Amora
- 2003–2006: Sporting CP

Senior career*
Years	Team	Apps	(Gls)
2006–2009	Sporting CP	0	(0)
2006–2007	→ Olivais Moscavide (loan)	19	(3)
2007–2008	→ Estoril (loan)	15	(3)
2008–2009	→ Estrela Amadora (loan)	36	(2)
2009–2011	Belenenses	53	(5)
2011–2013	CFR Cluj	12	(1)
2013–2015	Olhanense	56	(5)
2015–2016	Atlético	41	(2)
2017–2018	Enosis Neon	18	(0)
2019	Farul Constanța	17	(3)
2019–2020	Fabril	21	(3)
2020	Pinhalnovense	5	(1)
Total		293	(28)

International career
2006–2007	Portugal U20	11	(2)
2007–2009	Portugal U21	7	(0)
- * Club domestic league appearances and goals

Pedro Celestino Silva Soares (born 2 January 1987), known as Celestino, is a former professional footballer who played as a central midfielder.

He also held a Portuguese passport, due to the many years spent in the country.

== Club career ==
Born in Tarrafal, Celestino spent six years at Sporting CP (formative years included), but never appeared officially for the first team. He spent his first season as a professional with Olivais e Moscavide, on loan, being relegated from the Segunda Liga.

For 2007–08, also on loan, Celestino joined Estoril but, in January 2008, still owned by Sporting, he moved to another side in the Lisbon Region, Estrela da Amadora. He made his competitive debut on the 20th, starting in a 1–0 home win against Braga in the Taça de Portugal, and played his first Primeira Liga match the following week, featuring the second half of the 1–1 draw at Naval.

Celestino suffered top-flight relegation with Estrela the following campaign, due to irregularities. He met the same fate with his following club, Belenenses, but only due to sporting factors this time.

On 16 August 2011, Celestino signed a three-year contract with CFR Cluj in Romania. He returned to Portugal subsequently, going on to represent Olhanense and Atlético Clube de Portugal.

On 7 February 2019, Celestino agreed to a deal at Farul Constanța, moving to the Liga II side alongside his compatriots João Diogo and Diogo Rosado.

== International career ==
Celestino earned seven caps for the Portugal under-21 team. His debut occurred on 16 October 2007, as he played the entire 2–1 away victory over Montenegro in the 2009 UEFA European Championship qualifiers and provided the assist for Tiago Targino's winning goal.

== Honours ==
CFR Cluj

- Liga I: 2011–12
