= Raúl Almeida =

Portuguese footballer (born 1997)

Personal information
- Full name: Raúl Tiago Soares Almeida
- Date of birth: 2 November 1997 (age 29)
- Place of birth: Gondomar, Portugal
- Height: 1.75 m (5 ft 9 in)
- Position: Forward

Youth career
- 2006–2008: Porto
- 2008–2009: Gondomar
- 2009–2010: Sporting CP
- 2010–2011: Boavista
- 2011–2014: Gondomar
- 2014–2016: Paços de Ferreira

Senior career*
Years	Team	Apps	(Gls)
2016–2019	Paços de Ferreira	0	(0)
2016–2017	→ Porto B (loan)	9	(0)
2017–2018	→ Sporting da Covilhã (loan)	16	(2)
2018–2019	→ Gondomar (loan)	1	(0)
2019–2020	Águeda	7	(1)
2020	Paredes	1	(0)
- * Club domestic league appearances and goals as of 8 March 2020

Raúl Tiago Soares Almeida (born 2 November 1997) is a Portuguese footballer who plays as a forward.

== Career ==
On 7 August 2016, Almeida made his professional debut with FC Porto B in a 2016–17 LigaPro match against Aves.
