= Diogo Gouveia =

Portuguese footballer

Personal information
- Full name: Diogo Gouveia Miranda
- Date of birth: 25 January 1995 (age 31)
- Place of birth: Santa Maria da Feira, Portugal
- Height: 1.77 m (5 ft 10 in)
- Position: Midfielder

Team information
- Current team: União de Lamas
- Number: 6

Youth career
- 2008–2010: Feirense
- 2011–2014: Boavista

Senior career*
Years	Team	Apps	(Gls)
2014–2017	Boavista	3	(0)
2015	→ Kruoja Pakruojis (loan)	15	(0)
2015–2016	→ Mafra (loan)	2	(0)
2016	→ Cesarense (loan)	7	(0)
2016–2017	→ São João Ver (loan)		
2017–2019	São João Ver	66	(3)
2019–2020	Águeda	23	(0)
2020–2021	São João Ver	17	(0)
2021–	União de Lamas	10	(0)
- * Club domestic league appearances and goals as of 19:23, 21 November 2021 (UTC)

Diogo Gouveia Miranda, known as Diogo Gouveia (born 25 January 1995) is a Portuguese footballer who plays for União de Lamas as a midfielder.

== Career ==
On 25 October 2014, Gouveia made his professional debut with Boavista in a 2014–15 Primeira Liga match against Paços Ferreira.
