= Filipe Paiva =

Portuguese footballer

Personal information
- Full name: Filipe Manuel Carvalho Paiva
- Date of birth: 10 May 1991 (age 35)
- Place of birth: Alcochete, Portugal
- Height: 1.83 m (6 ft 0 in)
- Position: Central defender

Team information
- Current team: Belenenses
- Number: 23

Youth career
- 2001–2003: Alcochetense
- 2003–2008: Sporting CP
- 2008–2010: Belenenses

Senior career*
Years	Team	Apps	(Gls)
2010–	Belenenses	1	(0)
- * Club domestic league appearances and goals as of 21 July 2010

Filipe Manuel Carvalho Paiva (born 10 May 1991) is a Portuguese footballer who plays for C.F. Os Belenenses, as a central defender.
