= Fidalgo, Washington =

Unincorporated community in Washington, US

- Unincorporated community
- Location within Washington (state)
- Coordinates: 48°28′34″N 122°34′15″W
- Country: United States
- State: Washington
- County: Skagit
- Established: 1870
- Elevation: 33 ft (10 m)
- Time zone: UTC-8 (Pacific (PST))
  - Summer (DST): UTC-7 (PDT)
- Area code(s): 360, 564
- GNIS feature ID: 1531682

Fidalgo is an unincorporated community in Skagit County, in the U.S. state of Washington.

== History ==
A post office called Fidalgo was established in 1870, and remained in operation until 1910. The community takes its name from nearby Fidalgo Bay.
