= Rúben Ribeiro (footballer, born 1995) =

Portuguese footballer

Personal information
- Full name: Rúben Faria Ribeiro
- Date of birth: 16 December 1995 (age 30)
- Place of birth: Quinta do Conde, Portugal
- Height: 1.77 m (5 ft 10 in)
- Position: Left-back

Youth career
- 2003–2006: Quinta do Conde
- 2006–2010: Barreirense
- 2010–2011: Amora
- 2011: Vitória Setúbal
- 2012: Pinhalnovense
- 2012–2014: Sporting CP

Senior career*
Years	Team	Apps	(Gls)
2014–2016	Sporting CP B	28	(1)
2015	→ Santa Clara (loan)	11	(0)
2016–2017	Aves	6	(0)
2017–2018	Sintrense	22	(0)
2018–2021	B-SAD	0	(0)
2019–2020	→ Olímpico Montijo (loan)	27	(4)
2020	→ Fátima (loan)	4	(0)
2020–2021	B-SAD B	16	(0)
2021–2022	Idanhense	19	(1)
2022–2023	Racing Rioja	8	(0)
2023–2025	Fabril	40	(0)

International career
2013	Portugal U18	5	(0)
2013–2014	Portugal U19	5	(0)
2015	Portugal U20	2	(0)
- * Club domestic league appearances and goals as of 15:34, 17 February 2026 (UTC)

Rúben Faria Ribeiro (born 16 December 1995) is a Portuguese professional footballer who plays as a left-back.

He played 45 games in his country's second tier for Santa Clara, Sporting CP B and Aves, but spent most of his career in the third division for a variety of teams.

== Club career ==
Born in Quinta do Conde, Sesimbra, Ribeiro concluded his development at Sporting CP, and was loaned to C.D. Santa Clara on the final day of the January 2015 transfer window. He made his Segunda Liga debut on 8 February, playing 90 minutes a 1–1 home draw against S.C. Farense.

In the 2015–16 season, Ribeiro featured regularly for Sporting's reserves in the same league, scoring his first career goal on 2 April 2016 in a 2–2 draw at F.C. Penafiel. On 31 August, he severed his link with the Lions and signed a two-year contract with C.D. Aves in the second division.

Having played a small role in Aves' promotion as champions in 2017, Ribeiro dropped into the third tier by joining S.U. Sintrense, agreeing to a deal at Primeira Liga club B-SAD in January 2018. He never took to the field for the Estádio Nacional side, being loaned to Clube Olímpico do Montijo and C.D. Fátima in division three.

After a spell in the reserve team, Ribeiro left B-SAD in 2021 for C.U. Idanhense, newly promoted to the fourth division. A year later, after their relegation, he moved abroad for the first time to Racing Rioja CF in the Spanish equivalent.

== International career ==
Ribeiro earned 12 caps for Portugal from under-18 to under-20 levels. His debut for the latter came on 27 March 2015, when he started the 2–0 friendly win over Uzbekistan at the Estádio Municipal Sérgio Conceição in Coimbra.
