= Miguel Baptista =

Portuguese footballer

Personal information
- Date of birth: 10 September 1993 (age 33)
- Place of birth: Alcobaça, Portugal
- Position: Attacking midfielder

Team information
- Current team: Marinhense
- Number: 10

Youth career
- 2003–2007: Alcobaça
- 2007–2012: União de Leiria

Senior career*
Years	Team	Apps	(Gls)
2011–2012	União de Leiria	1	(0)
2012–2013	Alcobaça	13	(0)
2013–2014	AD Nogueirense	33	(4)
2014–2015	UD Valonguense	29	(3)
2015–2017	Eastbourne Borough	53	(5)
2016	→ Lewes (loan)	4	(0)
2017–2018	Pedras Rubras	27	(8)
2018–2019	Cinfães	33	(7)
2019	Sporting Espinho	9	(3)
2020	Amarante	14	(6)
2020	Salgueiros	9	(0)
2021	Marinhense	13	(3)
2021–2022	Länk Vilaverdense	24	(1)
2022–	Marinhense	33	(9)
2023–	Marinhense B	4	(2)
- * Club domestic league appearances and goals as of 15:57, 28 December 2023 (UTC)

Miguel Marques Baptista (born 10 September 1993 in Alcobaça) is a Portuguese footballer who plays for Marinhense as an attacking midfielder.

== Career ==
=== Eastbourne Borough ===
Baptista made his Borough debut on the 8 August 2015 on the first day of the season against Maidenhead United and played the full 90 minutes, Borough lost 2–1. He scored his first goal for the club on the 12 September against Basingstoke in a 5–1 win.

In late February 2016, Baptista was loaned out to Lewes for a month.
