= Clube Olímpico do Montijo =

Portuguese association football club

Olímpico Montijo
- Full name: Clube Olímpico do Montijo
- Nicknames: Aldeanos, Montijenses
- Short name: COM
- Founded: 11 July 2007
- Ground: Campo da Liberdade, Montijo
- Capacity: 3,000
- Chairman: João Monteiro
- Manager: David Martins
- League: AF Setúbal
- 2020–21 Campeonato de Portugal: 12th (relegated)
Home colours	Away colours

Clube Olímpico do Montijo is a Portuguese football club based in Montijo. Founded in 2007, it currently competes in the Campeonato de Portugal, holding home games at Campo da Liberdade, with a 3,000 capacity.

== History ==
Clube Olímpico do Montijo was founded on 11 July 2007 after the extinction of the historical Clube Desportivo do Montijo that disputed by three times the Portuguese First League (in the 70's)

The club competes in the Campeonato de Portugal (league), the third tier of the Portuguese football league system and is affiliated to Setúbal Football Association.

Montijo became the First Division district champion of the Setúbal Football Association in 2016/2017.

In the season 2017/2018, Montijo played in the Portuguese Championship (Series E) under the command of David Martins, and managed the club in the third tier of Portuguese football, with a ninth place in the final classification, which earned them the participation in the D Series of the 2018–19 Campeonato de Portugal.

On January 17, 2019, Olímpico do Montijo board announced that Mia Chunyan is the new investor and President of the Board of Directors of the Montijo-Futebol Olympic Club, SAD.

The Olímpico do Montijo has as great rival the Grupo Desportivo Alcochetense due to the great proximity (6 km) between the two cities, but due to the number of matches played, Montijo has so-called classic games, the FC Barreirense, Amora Futebol Clube, Atlético Clube de Portugal and Clube Oriental de Lisboa.

=== Gallery ===
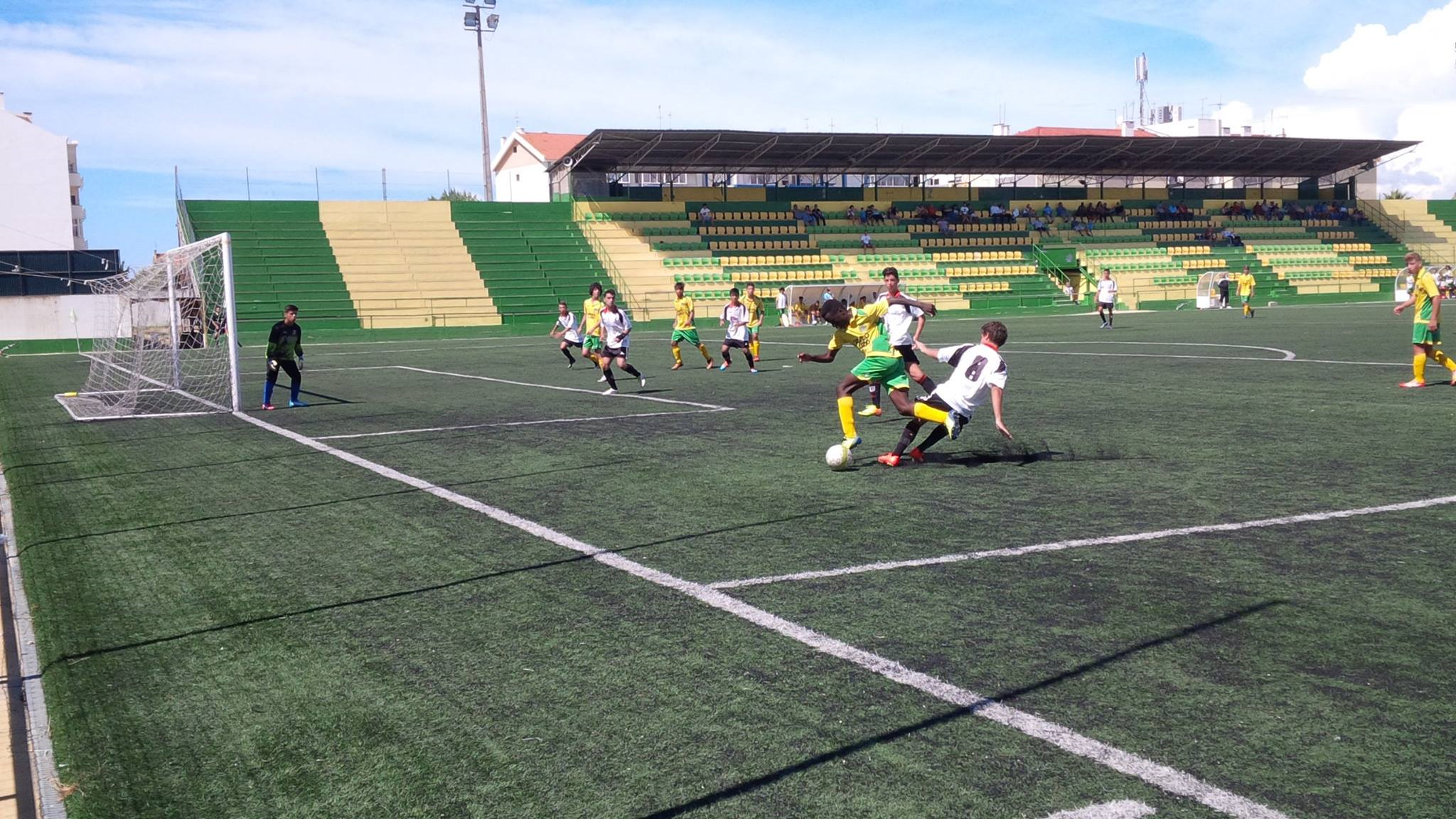
During a game of the Olímpico do Montijo in the Campo da Liberdade

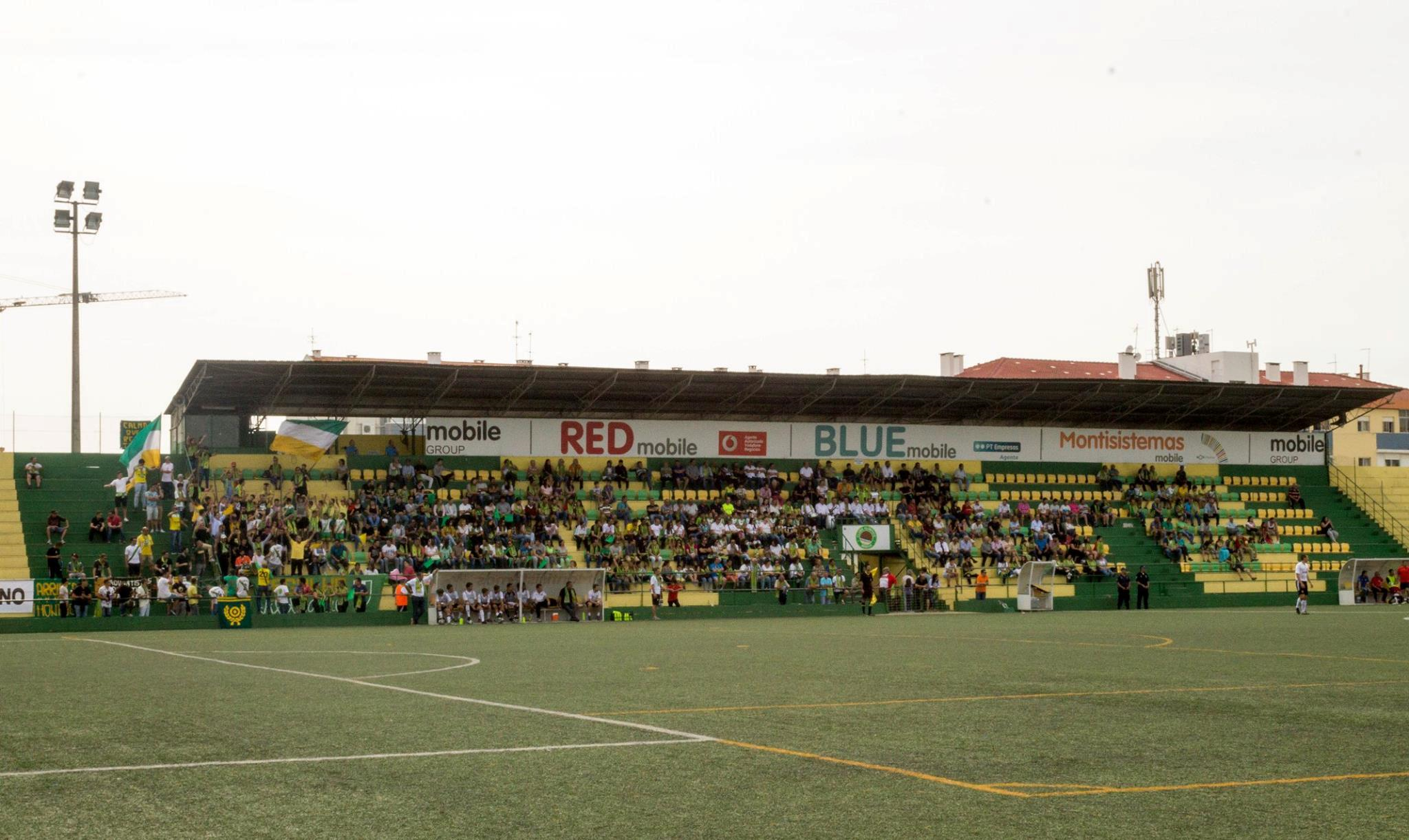
Campo da Liberdade, stadium of the Olímpico in Montijo

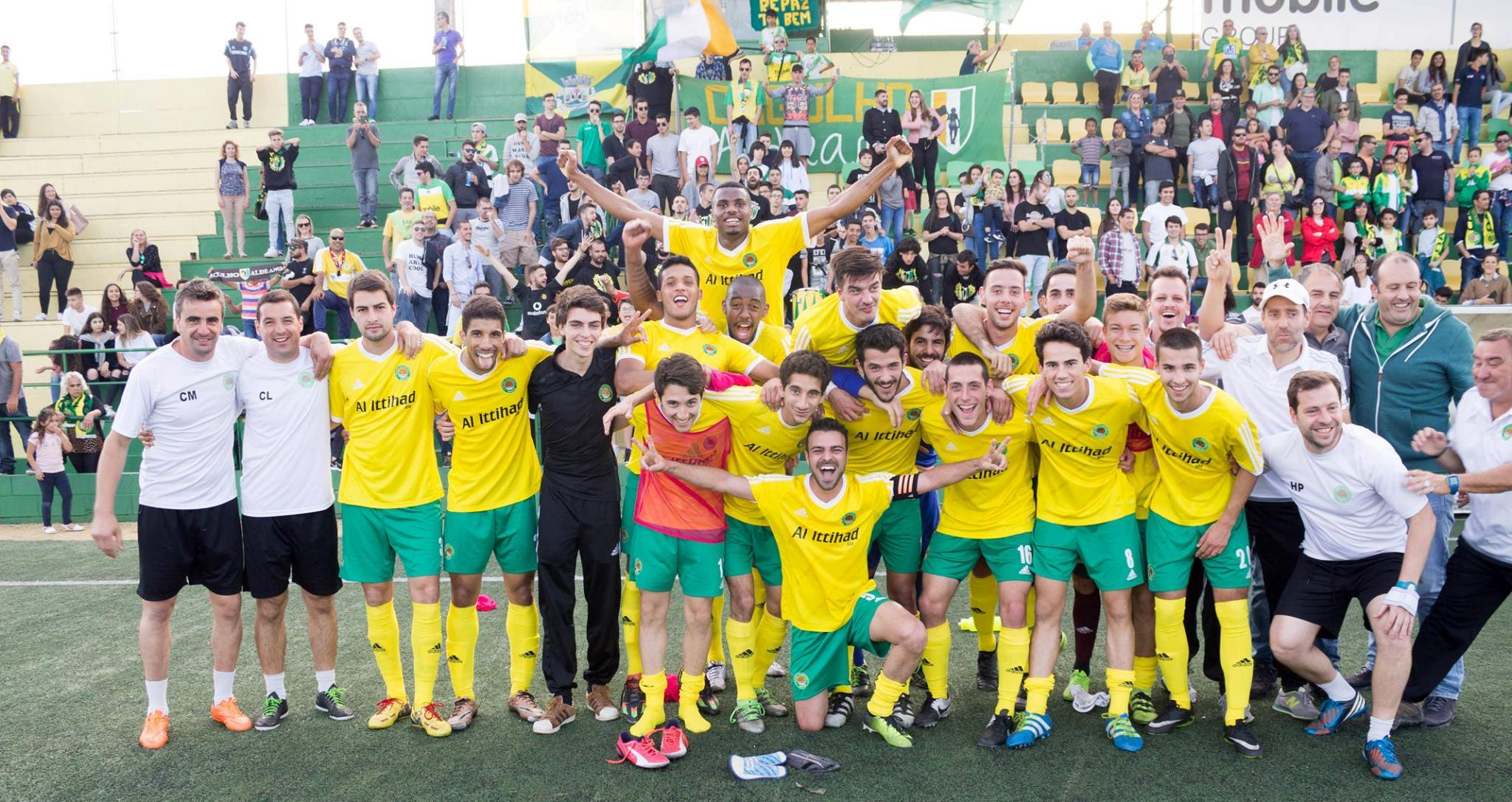
champion party of the Olímpico Montijo in the season 2016/2017

== Current squad ==
As of 2 March 2019

Note: Flags indicate national team as defined under FIFA eligibility rules; some limited exceptions apply. Players may hold more than one non-FIFA nationality.

No.	Pos.	Nation	Player
1	GK	POR	Diogo Arreigota
19	GK	BRA	Junior Alves
24	GK	EGY	Moamen Elhadad
27	DF	POR	Pedro Batista
12	DF	POR	Bernardo Carlos
20	DF	POR	Rúben Ribeiro
23	DF	POR	Diogo Branco
40	DF	POR	Bruno Jesus
22	DF	ANG	Vumi Mpasi
6	DF	POR	André Gomes
2	DF	POR	João Gomes (Obi)

No.	Pos.	Nation	Player
28	MF	POR	Hélio Roque
8	MF	POR	Marcelo Castro (captain)
10	MF	POR	Miguel Pires
3	MF	POR	Rafael Santos
60	MF	POR	Gustavo Filipe
21	MF	POR	José Lúcio
5	MF	COL	Brian Mosquera
32	MF	POR	Marco Martins
11	FW	POR	Tiago Targino
16	MF	KEN	Clifton Miheso
