= Éder Diego =

Brazilian footballer

Personal information
- Full name: Éder Diego Holanda do Nascimento
- Date of birth: 17 April 1985 (age 41)
- Place of birth: Belém, Brazil
- Height: 1.80 m (5 ft 11 in)
- Position: Attacking midfielder

Youth career
- 2003–2004: Braga

Senior career*
Years	Team	Apps	(Gls)
2004–2008	Braga B	0	(0)
2006–2008	→ Moreirense (loan)	2	(0)
2008–2009	Valdevez	0	(0)
2009–2011	Desportivo das Aves	11	(0)
2010	→ Ribeirão (loan)	0	(0)
2011	→ Cesarense (loan)	4	(0)
2011–2013	Limianos	54	(12)
2013–2016	Famalicão	73	(13)
2016–2017	União de Leiria	30	(5)
2017–2018	ARC Oleiros	14	(0)
2018–2020	GD Prado	57	(17)
2020–2022	Limianos	32	(1)
- * Club domestic league appearances and goals

Éder Diego Holanda do Nascimento, known as Éder Diego (born 17 April 1985) is a Brazilian former professional footballer who played as an attacking midfielder. He spent his entire career playing in Portugal.

== Club career ==
He made his professional debut in the Segunda Liga for Desportivo das Aves on 16 August 2009 in a game against Freamunde.
