= Fidalgo (sternwheeler) =

1920 steamboat in United States

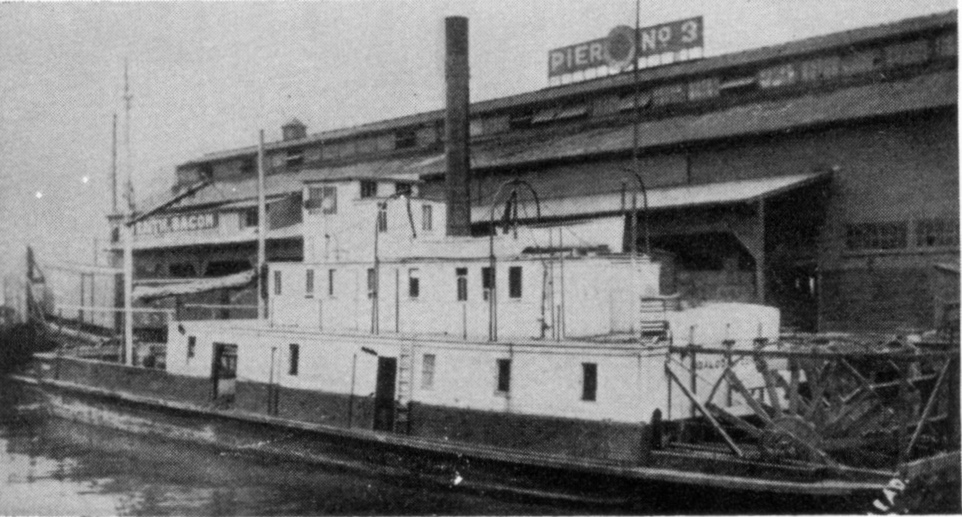
- Fidalgo

History
- Name: Fidalgo
- Route: Puget Sound
- Completed: c. 1920
- Out of service: 1923
- Fate: Wrecked.

General characteristics
- Installed power: twin steam engines, horizontal mounted
- Propulsion: sternwheel

Fidalgo was a sternwheel steam scow of the Puget Sound Mosquito Fleet.

== Career ==
Fidalgo was built in 1920, and was powered with engines removed from the wrecked or abandoned steamer Northern Light at Seattle. The vessel was built to haul grain from the La Conner area. In 1923 the vessel was destroyed in a storm at Seattle.
