= Bruno Alves (footballer, born 1990) =

Portuguese footballer (born 1990)

Personal information
- Full name: Bruno Miguel Mendes Alves
- Date of birth: 9 June 1990 (age 36)
- Place of birth: Guimarães, Portugal
- Height: 1.78 m (5 ft 10 in)
- Position: Midfielder

Team information
- Current team: Santiago Mascotelos

Youth career
- 2003–2004: Pevidém
- 2004–2009: Vitória Guimarães

Senior career*
Years	Team	Apps	(Gls)
2009−2015	Vitória Guimarães	12	(0)
2009−2010	→ Amarante (loan)	31	(0)
2010−2011	→ Lousada (loan)	27	(3)
2011−2012	→ Amarante (loan)	29	(3)
2012−2016	Vitória Guimarães B	107	(2)
2016−2017	Aves	31	(0)
2017−2019	Arouca	62	(0)
2019−2020	Fátima	18	(8)
2020−2021	Valadares Gaia	15	(2)
2021	Cova Piedade	14	(0)
2021−2022	Fafe	8	(0)
2022−2023	Pevidém	24	(0)
2023–2025	Sandinenses	48	(2)
2025–	Santiago Mascotelos	30	(1)
- * Club domestic league appearances and goals as of 17:56, 4 August 2026 (UTC)

Bruno Miguel Mendes Alves (born 9 June 1990 in Guimarães) is a Portuguese professional footballer who plays as a midfielder for GRCD Santiago de Candoso.
