= Isaac Cissé =

Ivorian footballer

Personal information
- Date of birth: 3 February 1994 (age 32)
- Place of birth: Abidjan, Ivory Coast
- Height: 1.91 m (6 ft 3 in)
- Position: Forward

Team information
- Current team: Beira-Mar

Youth career
- União Coimbra

Senior career*
Years	Team	Apps	(Gls)
2013–2016	Vitória Guimarães B	37	(4)
2014–2016	Vitória Guimarães	1	(0)
2016–2018	Union Titus Pétange	37	(14)
2018	Cinfães	4	(0)
2018–2019	Leça	24	(12)
2019–2020	Beira-Mar	18	(4)
2020–2021	Leça	30	(15)
2021–2022	Felgueiras 1932	28	(3)
2022	Paredes	5	(0)
2022–2023	Moncarapachense	18	(5)
2023–2025	São João de Ver	30	(8)
2025–	Beira-Mar	0	(0)
- * Club domestic league appearances and goals as of 27 July 2025

Isaac Cissé (born 3 February 1994) is an Ivorian professional footballer who plays as a forward for Beira-Mar.

== Career ==
In January 2020, Cissé returned to Leça, the club he played for in the 2018–19 season. He scored two goals in his comeback game against C.D. Trofense.
