= André Salvador =

Portuguese footballer

Personal information
- Full name: André Fernando Cabrita Salvador
- Date of birth: 4 November 1993 (age 33)
- Place of birth: Portimão, Portugal
- Height: 1.82 m (5 ft 11 1/2 in)
- Position: Midfielder

Team information
- Current team: Canelas
- Number: 26

Youth career
- 2006–2010: Portimonense
- 2010–2012: Sporting Braga

Senior career*
Years	Team	Apps	(Gls)
2012–2013	Merelinense	18	(7)
2013–2015	Portimonense	2	(0)
2013–2014	→ Quarteirense (loan)	14	(1)
2015	→ Vilaverdense (loan)	24	(2)
2015–2016	Vilaverdense	31	(6)
2016–2017	Leixões	25	(1)
2017–2019	Vilaverdense	36	(4)
2019–2020	Arouca	17	(1)
2020	Real SC	8	(0)
2021–2022	Canelas	42	(2)
2022–2023	Oliveira Hospital	27	(4)
2023–	Académica de Coimbra	5	(0)
- * Club domestic league appearances and goals as of 1 July 2024

André Fernando Cabrita Salvador (born 4 November 1993) is a Portuguese footballer who plays for CF Canelas 2010 as a midfielder.

== Football career ==
On 4 August 2013, Salvador made his professional debut with Portimonense S.C. in a 2013–14 Taça da Liga match against Trofense, when he replaced Bruno González in the 78th minute.
