= Rúben Freitas =

Portuguese footballer

Personal information
- Full name: Rúben Diogo Francisco Freitas
- Date of birth: 2 January 1993 (age 33)
- Place of birth: Odivelas, Portugal
- Height: 1.80 m (5 ft 11 in)
- Position: Right-back

Youth career
- 2001–2009: Sporting
- 2009–2012: Sporting Braga

Senior career*
Years	Team	Apps	(Gls)
2012–2013	Sporting Braga B	0	(0)
2013–2014	Salgueiros 08	18	(2)
2014–2015	Nikos & Sokratis	11	(1)
2015–2016	Lincoln Red Imps	4	(1)
2016–2018	Vilafranquense	63	(0)
2018–2020	Mafra	55	(3)
2020–2022	Nacional	40	(0)
2022–2024	Penafiel	35	(0)
2024–2025	Académica de Coimbra	14	(0)
- * Club domestic league appearances and goals as of 21 June 2025

Rúben Diogo Francisco Freitas (born 2 January 1993) is a Portuguese professional footballer who plays as a right-back.

== Club career ==
On 21 July 2018, Freitas made his professional debut with Mafra in a 2018–19 Taça da Liga match against Sporting Covilhã.
