= Thales (footballer) =

Brazilian footballer

Personal information
- Full name: Thales Bento Oleques
- Date of birth: 28 April 1994 (age 32)
- Place of birth: Pelotas, Brazil
- Height: 1.78 m (5 ft 10 in)
- Position: Defender

Team information
- Current team: XV de Piracicaba

Youth career
- 2009–2013: Paulista

Senior career*
| Years | Team | Apps | (Gls) |
| 2013–2015 | Paulista | 19 | (0) |
| 2013–2014 | → Braga B (loan) | 23 | (1) |
| 2014–2015 | → Juventude (loan) | 7 | (0) |
| 2015–2018 | Braga B | 91 | (0) |
| 2018–2022 | Arouca | 121 | (5) |
| 2022–2024 | Avaí | 59 | (0) |
| 2024–2025 | Operário Ferroviário | 40 | (0) |
| 2026 | Primavera | 8 | (0) |
| 2026– | XV de Piracicaba | 9 | (0) |
- * Club domestic league appearances and goals as of 21 June 2026

Thales Bento Oleques (born 28 April 1994), simply known as Thales, is a Brazilian professional footballer who plays as a defender for Brazilian club XV de Piracicaba.

== Career ==
Born in Pelotas, Thales spend his youth years at Paulista from 2009 to 2013. After he was promoted to the first team in 2013, he made 19 appearances, before joining Segunda Liga club Braga B on loan in search of more opportunities.

== Honours ==
Operário Ferroviário

- Campeonato Paranaense: 2025
