= Agustín Fidalgo =

Argentine footballer (born 1996)

Personal information
- Full name: Agustín Lucas Fidalgo
- Date of birth: 29 January 1996 (age 30)
- Place of birth: Argentina
- Height: 1.80 m (5 ft 11 in)
- Position: Forward

Youth career
- Tigre

Senior career*
Years	Team	Apps	(Gls)
2017–2020	Colegiales	23	(0)
- * Club domestic league appearances and goals

Agustín Lucas Fidalgo (born 29 January 1996) is an Argentine former professional footballer who played as a forward.

== Career ==
Fidalgo played in the youth ranks of Tigre, prior to joining Colegiales in 2017. His professional debut arrived on 2 December in a Primera B Metropolitana defeat to San Telmo, as he replaced Agustin Goñi after sixty-eight minutes. He made five more sub appearances in the 2017–18 campaign, before being selected to start for the first time in April 2018 against Villa San Carlos. Fidalgo announced his retirement in January 2020.

== Career statistics ==
Appearances and goals by club, season and competition
Club	Season	League			National cup		League cup		Continental		Other		Total	
Club	Season	Division	Apps	Goals	Apps	Goals	Apps	Goals	Apps	Goals	Apps	Goals	Apps	Goals
Colegiales	2017–18	Primera B Metropolitana	9	0	0	0	—		—		0	0	9	0
Colegiales	2018–19	Primera B Metropolitana	14	0	0	0	—		—		0	0	14	0
Colegiales	2019–20	Primera B Metropolitana	0	0	0	0	—		—		0	0	0	0
Career total			23	0	0	0	—		—		0	0	23	0
