= José Marcelo =

Portuguese footballer

Personal information
- Full name: José Marcelo Ferreira Marques
- Date of birth: 31 August 1998 (age 28)
- Place of birth: Santo António, Portugal
- Height: 1.81 m (5 ft 11 in)
- Position: Forward

Team information
- Current team: Anadia
- Number: 17

Youth career
- 2009–2017: Marítimo

Senior career*
Years	Team	Apps	(Gls)
2017–2019	Marítimo B	31	(5)
2021	Marítimo	1	(0)
2021–2022	Oliveirense	23	(3)
2023–	Anadia	3	(0)
- * Club domestic league appearances and goals as of 18 February 2023

José Marcelo Ferreira Marques (born 31 August 1998) is a Portuguese professional footballer who plays as a forward for Anadia.

== Professional career ==
Marcelo made his professional debut with Marítimo in a 3-0 Primeira Liga loss to Paços de Ferreira on 24 January 2021.
