= Estádio Municipal de Águeda =

Stadium in Águeda, Portugal

- Interactive map of Estádio Municipal de Águeda
- Full name: Estádio Municipal de Águeda
- Location: Águeda, Portugal
- Coordinates: 40°33′44.54″N 8°26′30.45″W
- Owner: Municipality of Águeda
- Capacity: 10,000
- Surface: Grass
- Field size: 105 x 68 m

Construction
- Built: 1974; 52 years ago
- Opened: 10 April 1974
- Renovated: 2003
- Architect: João Carlos da Silva Monteiro Velez

Tenant
- R.D. Águeda

Website
- Municipality of Águeda

The Municipal Stadium of Águeda (Portuguese: Estadio Municipal de Águeda) is a multiuse stadium located in the civil parish of Borrolha, in the municipality of Águeda, in the Portuguese district of Aveiro.

The municipal stadium is situated parallel the Souto River fronting various pasturelands and cultivated parcels, nearby the Palace of Borralha. The stadium includes grass pitch with central, covered bleacher, as well as bunks to the north and west. Still to be realised is the project to build a tartan track for athletics between the pitch and the stands.

The former trainer Mico Figueiredo once said that the municipal pitch "is the greatest adversary of whom presents a quality game", on the eve of the 1st Division district championship.

== History ==
Open in 2003, the stadium has a capacity for 10,000 people. Primarily used as venue for football matches, it is the home stadium of Recreio Desportivo de Águeda. The Recreio had for several years used the Campo de Venda Nova, until April 1974, when the field Redolho was acquired. The purchase of the lands were initiated by professor Marques de Queirós, then president of the municipal authority. This was the beginning of a "golden" era for association football in Águeda, when the team was ranked as one of the best national clubs, responsible for exporting notable players to other countries and culminating it the clubs ascension to 1st Division in 1982/83.

In 2004 it hosted a friendly match between the Portuguese national team and the Luxembourg national team.

== Portugal national team matches ==
The following national team matches were held in the stadium.

#	Date	Score	Opponent	Competition
1.	29 May 2004	3–0	Luxembourg	Friendly

== See also ==
- List of football stadiums in Portugal
