= Pedro Marques (footballer, born March 1998) =

Portuguese footballer

Personal information
- Full name: Pedro Pinho Marques
- Date of birth: 18 March 1998 (age 28)
- Place of birth: Oliveira de Azeméis, Portugal
- Height: 1.83 m (6 ft 0 in)
- Position: Centre-back

Youth career
- 2006–2008: Oliveirense
- 2008–2015: Porto
- 2013–2014: → Padroense (loan)
- 2015–2017: Paços Ferreira

Senior career*
Years	Team	Apps	(Gls)
2017–2021	Paços Ferreira	1	(0)
2018–2019	→ Coimbrões (loan)	21	(3)
2019–2020	→ Felgueiras 1932 (loan)	24	(1)
2021–2022	Torreense	15	(0)
2022–2023	Oliveirense	6	(0)
2023–2024	Amora	21	(0)
Total		88	(4)
- * Club domestic league appearances and goals

Pedro Pinho Marques (born 18 March 1998) is a Portuguese former professional footballer who played as a central defender.

== Club career ==
Marques was born in Oliveira de Azeméis, Aveiro District. He finished his youth career with F.C. Paços de Ferreira, having signed at the age of 17.

On 10 January 2017, Marques made his professional debut with the first team, playing the entire 2–2 home draw against F.C. Vizela in the group stage of the Taça da Liga. He spent the 2018–19 and 2019–20 seasons on loan to SC Coimbrões and F.C. Felgueiras 1932, both clubs in the third division.

Marques appeared in his first Primeira Liga match with Paços on 4 April 2021, coming on as a late substitute in the 2–0 away loss to F.C. Famalicão. On 8 July 2021, he returned to the third tier, signing with S.C.U. Torreense.

Marques alternated between the Liga Portugal 2 and the third division the following seasons, with U.D. Oliveirense and Amora FC.
