= Ivan Fidalgo =

Portuguese footballer

Personal information
- Full name: Ivan Matos Duarte Fidalgo
- Date of birth: 4 April 1992 (age 34)
- Place of birth: Coimbra, Portugal
- Height: 1.76 m (5 ft 9 in)
- Position: Forward

Team information
- Current team: Pampilhosa

Youth career
- 2002–2007: Académica de Coimbra
- 2007–2011: Marialvas

Senior career*
Years	Team	Apps	(Gls)
2011–2012	Anadia	19	(3)
2012–2014	Pampilhosa	62	(22)
2014–2015	Sertanense	30	(17)
2015–2017	Mafra	61	(15)
2017–2019	Oleiros	57	(11)
2019–2020	Águeda	24	(1)
2020–	Pampilhosa	7	(2)
- * Club domestic league appearances and goals as of 1 August 2021

Ivan Matos Duarte Fidalgo (born 4 April 1992) is a Portuguese footballer who plays for Pampilhosa as a forward.

== Career ==
On 2 August 2015, Fidalgo made his professional debut with Mafra in a 2015–16 Taça da Liga match against Leixões.
