= Tiago Targino =

Portuguese footballer

Personal information
- Full name: Tiago João Targino da Silva
- Date of birth: 6 June 1986 (age 40)
- Place of birth: Beja, Portugal
- Height: 1.80 m (5 ft 11 in)
- Position: Winger

Youth career
- 1995–2002: Desportivo Beja
- 2002–2004: Vitória Guimarães

Senior career*
Years	Team	Apps	(Gls)
2004–2012	Vitória Guimarães	109	(15)
2008	→ Manisaspor (loan)	10	(0)
2008–2009	→ Randers (loan)	17	(1)
2012	→ Vitória Setúbal (loan)	13	(1)
2012–2013	Olhanense	29	(4)
2013–2014	AEL Limassol	14	(1)
2014	Jagiellonia Białystok	0	(0)
2015	Trofense	0	(0)
2016	Académica Lobito	1	(0)
2016–2017	Sampedrense	3	(0)
2017	Lusitanos	8	(3)
2018	Lusitano Évora	1	(1)
2018–2019	Olímpico Montijo	18	(2)
2019–2020	Comércio Indústria	18	(5)
2020–2021	Caçadores Taipas	8	(0)
Total		249	(33)

International career
2006–2007	Portugal U20	13	(1)
2007	Portugal U21	3	(1)
- * Club domestic league appearances and goals

Tiago João Targino da Silva (born 6 June 1986), known as Targino, is a Portuguese former professional footballer who played as a winger.

== Club career ==
Targino was born in Beja, Alentejo. The son of a Brazilian who played for a host of Portuguese clubs such as Desportivo Beja, Portimonense and Olhanense, he started his professional career in 2004 with Vitória de Guimarães, having joined their youth academy two years before. He made his Primeira Liga debut on 12 December 2004 in a 3–1 away win against Penafiel, and finished his first season with two goals, notably in a 1–0 home victory over Beira-Mar where he scored in the 90th minute.

In January 2008, Targino was loaned to Turkish Süper Lig's Manisaspor. He had started the campaign with Vitória, netting in a 1–0 home defeat of Nacional on 17 September 2007, but received relatively little playing time.

On 11 July 2008, Targino was again loaned, joining Danish Superliga side Randers. He made his league debut against Brøndby as a late substitute in a 3–0 away win, again coming from the bench in the next game with Nordsjælland. After teammate Mikkel Beckmann was injured against Midtjylland, he featured in the starting lineup the following three matches, as a right winger. He scored his only goal on 19 April 2009, in a 2–0 victory at the same opponent.

Targino returned to Guimarães for 2009–10 but, midway through the season, suffered a serious cruciate ligament injury which put him out of action for nearly one year. On 8 November 2010, in his second appearance after returning, he came from the bench and scored twice to help his team come from behind to win 3–2 at Sporting CP, the Minho club's first win in Lisbon in 14 years.

Targino' last season in the Portuguese top tier was 2012–13, with Olhanense. The following was spent in the Cypriot First Division with AEL Limassol after leaving the Algarve due to unpaid wages and, subsequently, from the age of 28 until his retirement, he played mostly in the Portuguese amateur leagues, with a brief spell in the Andorran Primera Divisió as well.

== International career ==
On 11 September 2007, Targino won his first cap for Portugal at under-21 level, when he replaced Paulo Machado early into the second half of an eventual 4–0 win against Montenegro in the 2009 UEFA European Championship qualifiers. The following month, against the same adversary and in the same stage, he scored his only goal (2–1 victory in Podgorica).
