= Pevidém =

Village in Portugal

Coordinates: 41°25′37″N 8°21′15″W

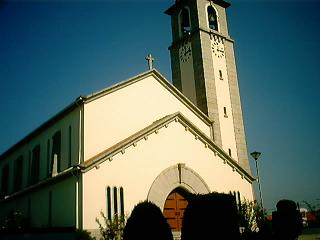
Church of the Portuguese town, Pevidém

Pevidém is a village in the municipality of Guimarães, province Minho, Portugal.
