= João Ricardo (footballer, born 1991) =

Portuguese footballer

Personal information
- Full name: João Ricardo Pinto da Silva
- Date of birth: 10 August 1991 (age 35)
- Place of birth: Espinho, Portugal
- Height: 1.79 m (5 ft 10 1/2 in)
- Position: Midfielder

Team information
- Current team: Espinho
- Number: 15

Youth career
- 1999–2002: São Félix da Marinha
- 2002–2003: Espinho
- 2003–2007: Porto
- 2006–2007: → Padroense (loan)
- 2007–2010: Feirense

Senior career*
| Years | Team | Apps | (Gls) |
| 2010–2014 | Feirense | 39 | (0) |
| 2010–2011 | → Espinho (loan) | 21 | (0) |
| 2011–2012 | → Gondomar (loan) | 29 | (1) |
| 2014−2016 | Académico Viseu | 45 | (0) |
| 2016–2017 | Anadia | 24 | (2) |
| 2017– | Espinho | 64 | (0) |
- * Club domestic league appearances and goals as of 00:47, 30 November 2019 (UTC)

João Ricardo Pinto da Silva (born 10 August 1991 in Espinho) is a Portuguese professional footballer who plays for Espinho as a midfielder.
