= Pedro Almeida (footballer, born 1994) =

Portuguese footballer

Pedro Tavares Almeida (born 6 March 1994) is a Portuguese footballer who plays for Sanjoanense as a defender.

== Career ==
On 11 December 2013, Tavares made his professional debut with Leixões in a 2013–14 Segunda Liga match against Sporting Covilhã, when he replaced Rui Coentrão (68th minute).
