= Pevidém S.C. =

Portuguese sports club

Pevidém SC
- Full name: Pevidém Sport Club
- Founded: 1989; 36 years ago Refounded: 30 June 2006
- Ground: Parque de Jogos Albano Martins Coelho Lima, Pevidém, Guimarães
- Capacity: 3,500
- League: Campeonato de Portugal
- 2021–22: Liga 3, relegated

Pevidém Sport Clube is a Portuguese sports club from Pevidém, Guimarães.

The men's football team plays in the Campeonato de Portugal.
