= 2005–06 Taça de Portugal =

Tournament details
- Country: Portugal
- Dates: 4 September 2005 – 14 May 2006
- Teams: 228

Final positions
- Champions: Porto (13th title)
- Runners-up: Vitória de Setúbal

Tournament statistics
- Matches played: 229
- Goals scored: 620 (2.71 per match)
- Top goal scorer(s): Benni McCarthy (3 goals)

The 2005–06 Taça de Portugal was the 66th edition of the Portuguese football knockout tournament, organized by the Portuguese Football Federation (FPF). The 2005–06 Taça de Portugal began on 4 September 2005. The final was played on 14 May 2006 at the Estádio Nacional.

Vitória de Setúbal were the previous holders, having defeated Benfica 2–1, in the previous season's final. However, Vitória de Setúbal was not able to regain their title as they were defeated in the final by Porto. Porto defeated Vitória de Setúbal, 1–0 to win their fourth title in seven seasons and claim their 13th Taça de Portugal in their history.

Since Porto had already qualified for the 2006–07 UEFA Champions League as domestic title holders, Vitória by reaching the final of the Taça de Portugal, had guaranteed a place in the 2006–07 UEFA Cup. As Porto won both the league and cup in the same season, Vitória would qualify for the 2006 Supertaça Cândido de Oliveira as the cup runner-up.

== Format and schedule ==
Round	Date(s)	Clubs entering this round	Clubs from the previous round	Clubs involved	Fixtures
First round	4 September 2005	140 clubs competing in the Terceira Divisão and Portuguese District Leagues	none	140	70
Second round ^{1}	18 September 2005	52 clubs competing in the Portuguese Second Division	70 winners from the first round	122	61
Third round	5 October 2005	18 clubs competing in the Liga de Honra	61 winners from the second round	81	40
Fourth round	26–30 October 2005; 11–12 November 2005	18 clubs competing in the Primeira Liga	40 winners from third round	59	29
Fifth round	11 January 2006	none	29 winners from fourth round	30	15
Sixth round	8 February 2006	none	15 winners from fifth round	15	7
Quarter-finals	15 March 2006	none	7 winners from sixth round	8	4
Semi-finals	22–23 March 2006	none	4 winners from the quarterfinals	4	2
Final	14 May 2006	none	2 winners from the semifinals	2	1

- ^1 Fifty two of the fifty eight teams who participated in the 2005–06 Segunda Divisão, played in this round. Benfica B, Braga B, Marítimo B, Porto B and Vitória de Setúbal B were unable to compete in the domestic cup competition due to the possibility of encountering their senior side in the competition. Queluz also did not participate.

== Teams ==
=== Primeira Liga ===
- Académica de Coimbra
- Belenenses
- Benfica
- Boavista
- Estrela da Amadora
- Porto
- Gil Vicente
- Marítimo
- Nacional
- Naval
- Paços de Ferreira
- Penafiel
- Rio Ave
- SC Braga
- Sporting CP
- União de Leiria
- Vitória de Guimarães
- Vitória de Setúbal

=== Liga de Honra ===
- Barreirense
- Beira-Mar
- Chaves
- Desportivo das Aves
- Estoril
- Feirense
- Gondomar
- Leixões
- Maia
- Marco
- Moreirense
- Olhanense
- Ovarense
- Portimonense
- Santa Clara
- Sporting da Covilhã
- Varzim
- Vizela

=== Second Division ===
Série A

- Camacha
- Fafe
- Famalicão
- Freamunde
- Lixa
- Os Sandinenses
- Portosantense
- Ribeirão
- Trofense
- União da Madeira
- União Torcatense
- Valdevez
- Vilaverdense

Série B

- Aliados Lordelo
- Dragões Sandinenses
- Esmoriz
- Fiães
- Infesta
- Lousada
- Paredes
- Pedras Rubras
- Pontassolense
- Ribeira Brava
- Sanjoanense
- Sporting de Espinho

Série C

- Abrantes
- Benfica Castelo Branco
- Fátima
- Nelas
- Oliveira do Bairro
- Oliveira do Hospital
- Oliveirense
- Pampilhosa
- Portomosense
- Penalva do Castelo
- Rio Maior
- Sporting de Pombal
- Tourizense
- União de Coimbra

Série D

- Casa Pia
- Imortal
- Louletano
- Madalena
- Mafra
- Odivelas
- Olivais e Moscavide
- Operário
- Oriental
- Pinhalnovense
- Silves
- Torreense
- União Micaelense

=== Third Division ===
Série A

- AD Oliveirense
- Amares
- Bragança
- Brito
- Cabeceirense
- Cerveira
- Correlhã
- Esposende
- Joane
- Maria da Fonte
- Merelinense
- Monção
- Mondinense
- Mirandela
- Valenciano
- Valpaços
- Vianense
- Vinhais

Série B

- Ataense
- Canedo
- Cinfães
- Ermesinde
- Leça
- Lourosa
- Moncorvo
- Padroense
- Rebordosa
- Rio Tinto
- São Pedro da Cova
- Tarouquense
- Tirsense
- UD Valonguense
- Vila Meã
- Vila Real
- Vilanovense

Série C

- AD Valonguense
- Anadia
- Arrifanense
- Avanca
- Cesarense
- Estarreja
- Fornos de Algodres
- Gafanha
- Marialvas
- Milheiroense
- São João de Ver
- Sátão
- Social Lamas
- Souropires
- Tocha
- Tondela
- União de Lamas
- Valecambrense

Série D

- Alcobaça
- Amiense
- Atlético Riachense
- Beneditense
- Bidoeirense
- Caldas
- Caranguejeira
- Eléctrico
- Fundão
- Idanhense
- Marinhense
- Mirandense
- Monsanto
- Peniche
- Sertanense
- Sourense
- Vigor Mocidade

Série E

- 1º de Dezembro
- Alcochetense
- Atlético CP
- Atlético do Cacém
- Câmara de Lobos
- Caniçal
- Carregado
- CF Benfica
- Loures
- Machico
- Montijo
- O Elvas
- Ouriquense
- Santana
- Sintrense
- União de Tires
- Vialonga
- Vilafranquense

Série F

- Aljustrelense
- Almancilense
- Amora
- Beira-Mar de Monte Gordo
- Castrense
- CF Vasco da Gama
- Desportivo de Beja
- Estrela de Vendas Novas
- Ferreiras
- Juventude Évora
- Lagoa
- Lusitano de Évora
- Lusitano VRSA
- Messinense
- Monte Trigo
- Oeiras
- Sesimbra

Série Azores

- Angrense
- Boavista Flores
- Lusitânia
- Marítimo Graciosa
- Praiense
- Rabo de Peixe
- Santiago
- Santo António
- Velense
- Vitória do Pico

=== District Leagues ===
- Águia dos Arrifes
- Amarante
- Barreiro
- Coruchense
- Escalos de Baixo
- Esperança de Lagos
- Flamengos
- Lusitano de Viseu
- Macedo de Cavaleiros
- Marinhas
- Milieu Guarda
- União Nogueirense
- Paços de Brandão
- Ponterrolense
- Santa Eulália
- Santacruzense
- Sarilhense
- Távora
- União da Serra
- União Montemor
- Vasco da Gama AC

== First round ==
For the first round draw, teams were drawn against each other in accordance to their geographical location. The draw was split up into four sections: teams from the north, the center, the south and the Azores region. Ties were played on 4 September. In the first round, three sides forfeited their respective matches thus allowing their opponents to proceed to the next round. The first round of the cup saw teams from the Terceira Divisão (IV) start the competition alongside some teams who registered to participate in the cup from the Portuguese District Leagues (V).

=== North Zone ===
Home team	Score	Away team
Amarante (V)	0–2	Vila Real (IV)
Amares (IV)	3–4 (aet)	Ataense (IV)
Bragança (IV)	1–2	Merelinense (IV)
Cabeceirense (IV)	0–0 (aet, p. 3–0)]	Cerveira (IV)
Canedo (IV)	1–0	Macedo de Cavaleiros (V)
Cinfães (IV)	0–0 (aet, p. 2–4)	Vila Meã (IV)
Ermesinde (IV)	5–0	Correlhã (IV)
Leça (IV)	1–0	Esposende (IV)
Lusitano de Viseu (V)	0–6	Lourosa (IV)
Marinhas (V)	1–0	Valpaços (IV)
Monção (IV)	WO	Salgueiros (IV)

Home team	Score	Away team
Mondinense (IV)	1–0	Moncorvo (IV)
Rio Tinto (IV)	0–2	Maria da Fonte (IV)
Sao Pedro da Cova (IV)	3–2	Rebordosa (IV)
Tarouquense (IV)	1–3	Mirandela (IV)
Távora (V)	0–2	Joane (IV)
Tirsense (IV)	1–0	AD Oliveirense (IV)
UD Valonguense (IV)	WO	Vilanovense (IV)
Valenciano (IV)	3–0	Vila Pouca de Aguiar (IV)
Vianense (IV)	2–1	Padroense (IV)
Vinhais (IV)	2–3 (aet)	Brito (IV)

=== Central Zone ===
Home team	Score	Away team
AD Valonguense (IV)	0–1	Tocha (IV)
Alcobaça (IV)	0–1 (aet)	Caldas (IV)
Anadia (IV)	0–4	Avanca (IV)
Arenense (IV)	WO	Tondela (IV)
Arrifanense (IV)	3–0	União Nogueirense (V)
Atlético Riachense (IV)	4–2	Amiense (IV)
Beneditense (IV)	1–0	Os Marialvas (IV)
Bidoeirense (IV)	3–2	Milieu Guarda (V)
Cesarense (IV)	1–1 (aet, p. 3–5)	Caranguejeira (IV)
Eléctrico (IV)	2–1	Valecambrense (IV)
Estarreja (IV)	0–1	Fornos de Algodres (IV)

Home team	Score	Away team
Idanhense (IV)	1–3	União da Serra (V)
Marinhense (IV)	1–0	Peniche (IV)
Milheiroense (IV)	2–0	Sátão (IV)
Mirandense (IV)	2–2 (aet, p. 4–2)	Sourense (IV)
Monsanto (IV)	5–0	Vigor Mocidade (IV)
Paços de Brandão (V)	0–3	Coruchense (V)
Sertanense (IV)	2–0	Gafanha (IV)
Social Lamas (IV)	9–0	Escalos de Baixo (V)
Souropires (IV)	2–1	São João de Ver (IV)
União de Lamas (IV)	1–0	Fundão (IV)

=== South Zone ===
Home team	Score	Away team
Águia dos Arrifes (V)	0–4	Carregado (IV)
Alcochetense (IV)	3–1	Amora (IV)
Aljustrelense (IV)	2–0	Sesimbra (IV)
Almancilense (IV)	2–1	Vilafranquense (IV)
Atlético CP (IV)	6–0	Farense (IV)
Beira-Mar de Monte Gordo (IV)	5–2 (aet)	Monte Trigo (IV)
Caniçal (IV)	1–0	Vialonga (IV)
Câmara de Lobos (IV)	5–1	União de Tires (IV)
Castrense (IV)	0–3	Loures (IV)
Esperança de Lagos (V)	2–5	Lusitano VRSA (IV)
Estrela de Vendas Novas (IV)	2–0	Machico (IV)

Home team	Score	Away team
Lusitano de Évora (IV)	5–1	CF Vasco da Gama (IV)
Messinense (IV)	5–0	Santa Eulália (V)
Montijo (IV)	2–2 (aet, p. 5–6)	Benfica (IV)
O Elvas (IV)	1–1 (aet, p. 3–4)	Juventude Évora (IV)
Oeiras (IV)	1–1 (aet, p. 4–3)	1º de Dezembro (IV)
Ponterrolense (V)	7–2	Ferreiras (IV)
Santacruzense (V)	0–0 (aet, p. 3–2)	Ouriquense (IV)
Santana (IV)	1–0	Desportivo de Beja (IV)
Sarilhense (V)	3–2 (aet)	Sintrense (IV)
União Montemor (V)	0–1	Lagoa (IV)
Vasco da Gama AC (V)	2–1	Atlético do Cacém (IV)

=== Azores Zone ===
Home team	Score	Away team
Angrense (IV)	2–0	Santo António (IV)
Barreiro (V)	0–2	Santiago (IV)
Boavista Flores (IV)	2–0	Rabo de Peixe (IV)

Home team	Score	Away team
Lusitânia (IV)	4–1	Vitória do Pico (IV)
Marítimo Graciosa (IV)	4–2	Flamengos (V)
Praiense (IV)	2–1	Velense (IV)

== Second round ==
The second round ties were played on 18 September. Maria da Fonte's cup tie against Felgueiras, saw Felgueiras forfeit the match with the Portuguese Football Federation awarding the victory to Maria da Fonte. The second round saw teams from the Portuguese Second Division (III) enter the competition.

Home team	Score	Away team
Abrantes (III)	6–2	União de Coimbra (III)
Alcochetense (IV)	1–2	União Micaelense (III)
Aliados Lordelo (III)	1–0 (aet)	São Pedro da Cova (IV)
Aljustrelense (IV)	1–0	Torreense (III)
Angrense (IV)	3–2	Casa Pia (III)
Arrifanense (IV)	1–2	Vila Meã (IV)
Ataense (IV)	1–2 (aet)	Milheiroense (IV)
Atlético CP (IV)	3–1	Marítimo Graciosa (IV)
Boavista Flores (IV)	0–0 (aet, p. 4–2)	Estrela de Vendas Novas (IV)
Bidoeirense (IV)	1–2	Nelas (III)
Camacha (III)	2–2 (aet, p. 3–2)	União da Madeira (III)
Canedo (IV)	1–0	Infesta (III)
Caniçal (IV)	1–0	Lusitânia (IV)
Caranguejeira (IV)	0–1	Mirandense (IV)
Carregado (IV)	1–1 (aet, p. 2–4)	Messinense (IV)
CF Benfica (IV)	1–2	Ponterrolense (V)
Dragões Sandinenses (V)	0–0 (aet, p. 5–6)	Pontassolense (III)
Eléctrico (IV)	1–1 (aet, p. 5–4)	Oliveira do Hospital (III)
Ermesinde (IV)	0–2	Esmoriz (III)
Fafe (III)	2–1	Brito (IV)
Famalicão (III)	0–1	Lixa (III)
Fátima (III)	3–2	Pampilhosa (III)
Imortal (III)	2–1	Almancilense (IV)
Joane (IV)	1–0	Valdevez (III)
Lagoa (IV)	4–3	Loures (IV)
Leça (IV)	0–2	Sanjoanense (III)
Louletano (III)	4–3 (aet)	Lusitano de Évora (IV)
Lousada (III)	1–0 (aet)	Ribeira Brava (III)
Lusitânia (IV)	4–1	Sarilhense (V)
Lusitano VRSA (IV)	0–2	Odivelas (III)
Maria da Fonte (IV)	WO	Felgueiras (III)

Home team	Score	Away team
Marinhas (V)	0–1	Portosantense (III)
Marinhense (IV)	0–2	Souropires (IV)
Mirandela (IV)	2–1	Câmara de Lobos (IV)
Monção (IV)	1–2	Trofense (IV)
Monsanto (IV)	2–0	Caldas (IV)
Oeiras (IV)	2–0	Oriental (III)
Oliveira do Bairro (III)	3–0	Fornos de Algodres (IV)
Oliveirense (III)	3–0	Penalva do Castelo (III)
Operário (III)	1–0	Olivais e Moscavide (III)
Os Sandinenses (III)	2–0	Cabeceirense (IV)
Parades (III)	3–1	Avanca (IV)
Pedras Rubras (III)	1–0	Santana (IV)
Pinhalnovense (III)	4–0	Vasco da Gama AC (IV)
Praiense (IV)	2–1	Juventude Évora (IV)
Real (III)	5–2	Beira-Mar de Monte Gordo (IV)
Ribeirão (III)	2–2 (aet, p. 5–4)	Merelinense (IV)
Rio Maior (III)	1–1 (aet, p. 0–2)	Portomosense (III)
Santacruzense (V)	0–2	Freamunde (III)
Santiago (IV)	0–0 (aet, p. 3–4)	Madalena (III)
Silves (III)	2–2 (aet, p. 4–3)	Mafra (III)
Sporting de Espinho (III)	1–0 (aet)	Fiães (III)
Sporting de Pombal (III)	0–1	Atlético Riachense (IV)
Tocha (IV)	0–3	Beneditense (IV)
Tondela (IV)	6–0	Coruchense (V)
Tourizense (III)	3–0	Sertanense (IV)
União da Serra (V)	0–2	Social Lamas (IV)
União Torcatense (III)	3–0	Valenciano (IV)
UD Valonguense (IV)	1–1 (aet, p. 3–4)	Tirsense (IV)
Vianense (IV)	2–0	Vilaverdense (III)
Vila Real (IV)	1–2	Mondinense (IV)

== Third round ==
The draw for the third round took place on 22 September. Most of the third round ties were played on 5 October. The cup ties involving Imortal and Freamunde, Nelas and Moreirense and Oliveirense and Esmoriz were played on 8 October. Due to the odd number of games in the third round, Pontassolense progressed to the next round due to having no opponent to face at this stage of the competition. The third round saw teams from the Liga de Honra (II) enter the competition.

Home team	Score	Away team
Abrantes (III)	2–0	Boavista Flores (IV)
Angrense (IV)	1–2	Leixões (II)
Atlético CP (IV)	2–0	Gondomar (II)
Barreirense (II)	2–1	Atlético Riachense (IV)
Beneditense (IV)	0–2	Caniçal (IV)
Chaves (II)	1–2 (aet)	Pinhalnovense (III)
Eléctrico (IV)	2–4	Tirsense (IV)
Fafe (III)	3–0	Social Lamas (IV)
Fátima (III)	2–1	Lourosa (IV)
Joane (IV)	0–1 (aet)	Lousada (III)
Louletano (III)	5–1	Operário (III)
Madalena (III)	0–1	União Micaelense (III)
Maia (III)	2–4	Lagoa (IV)
Marco (II)	6–4 (aet)	Odivelas (III)
Messinense (IV)	1–3 (aet)	Vizela (II)
Milheiroense (IV)	1–4	Estoril (II)
Mirandela (III)	1–0	Oliveira do Bairro (IV)
Mirandense (IV)	1–1 (aet, p. 4–5)	Maria da Fonte (IV)
Mondinense (IV)	0–2	Vila Meã (IV)
Monsanto (IV)	1–3	Feirense (II)

Home team	Score	Away team
Os Sandinenses (III)	0–1	Tourizense (III)
Parades (III)	2–1	Portosantense (III)
Portomosense (III)	2–0	Silves (III)
Ponterrolense (V)	0–2	Olhanense (II)
Portimonense (II)	2–1 (aet)	Benfica Castelo Branco (III)
Praiense (IV)	0–2	Desportivo das Aves (II)
Real (III)	3–4	Camacha (III)
Ribeirão (III)	2–1	União Torcatense (III)
Sanjoanense (III)	1–1 (aet, p. 1–3)	Aljustrelense (IV)
Souropires (IV)	2–1	Aliados Lordelo (III)
Sporting da Covilhã (II)	2–1	Pedras Rubras (III)
Sporting de Espinho (III)	1–2	Oeiras (IV)
Tondela (IV)	1–2	Ovarense (II)
Trofense (III)	1–3 (aet)	Lixa (III)
União de Lamas (IV)	1–0	Beira-Mar (II)
Vianense (III)	1–2	Santa Clara (II)
Varzim (II)	3–1 (aet)	Canedo (IV)
Imortal (III)	1–0	Freamunde (III)
Nelas (III)	0–0 (aet, p. 4–2)	Moreirense (II)
Oliveirense (III)	1–1 (aet, p. 4–3)	Esmoriz (III)

== Fourth round ==
The draw for the fourth round took place on 10 October. The majority of games were played on 26 October. Parades's cup tie against Nelas was played on 30 October whilst the ties involving Paços de Ferreira and Tourizense, and Naval and Pontassolense were played on 12–13 November. Due to the odd number of games in the third round, Vitória de Guimarães progressed to the next round due to having no opponent to face at this stage of the competition. The fourth round, saw teams from the Primeira Liga (I) enter the competition.

Home team	Score	Away team
Abrantes (III)	3–0	Maria da Fonte (IV)
Académica de Coimbra (I)	3–2	Gil Vicente (I)
Aljustrelense (IV)	3–0	Olhanense (II)
Camacha (III)	0–1 (aet)	Estoril (II)
Caniçal (IV)	0–1	Fátima (III)
Estrela da Amadora (I)	2–0	União Micaelense (III)
Fafe (III)	0–1	Vitória de Setúbal (I)
Feirense (II)	1–1 (aet, p. 3–5)	Pinhalnovense (III)
Lagoa (IV)	1–0	Ovarense (II)
Lixa (III)	4–0	Penafiel (I)
Louletano (III)	1–0	Atlético CP (IV)
Oeiras (IV)	1–3	Boavista (I)
Oliveirense (III)	2–0	União de Lamas (IV)
Portimonense (II)	0–0 (aet, p. 4–5)	Souropires (IV)
Sporting CP (I)	2–0	Varzim (II)

Home team	Score	Away team
Sporting da Covilhã II)	2–0	Lousada (III)
Vila Meã (IV)	2–1	Mirandela (III)
Vizela (II)	3–1	Santa Clara II)
Braga (I)	1–0 (aet)	União de Leiria (I)
Portomosense (III)	1–1 (aet, p. 9–8)	Barreirense (II)
Desportivo das Aves (II)	1–0	Belenenses (I)
Rio Ave (I)	0–0 (aet, p. 3–4)	Ribeirão (III)
Leixões (II)	1–2	Benfica (I)
Imortal (III)	1–1 (aet, p. 6–7)	Nacional (I)
Porto (I)	1–0	Marco (II)
Marítimo (I)	2–0	Tirsense (IV)
Parades (III)	4–0	Nelas (III)
Paços de Ferreira I)	0–1	Tourizense (III)
Naval (I)	1–0	Pontassolense (III)

== Fifth round ==
The draw for the fifth round took place on 17 November. The fifth round ties were all played on 11 January.

11 January 2006	Paredes (III)	3–1	Lagoa (IV)	Estádio Cidade Desportiva de Paredes, Paredes
14:30	Campos 32'; Álvaro 41'; Teixeira 85'		Rosa 53'	Referee: Hernâni Duarte

11 January 2006	Tourizense (III)	0–2	Benfica (I)	Estádio Visconde do Vinhal, Tábua
14:30			Robert 66'; Nuno Gomes 79'	Attendance: 8,000; Referee: João Vilas Boas

11 January 2006	Aljustrelense (IV)	0–1	Oliveirense (III)	Estádio Municipal De Aljustrel, Aljustrel
15:00			Marcos Antônio 12'	Referee: José Albino

11 January 2006	Lixa (III)	1–0	Ribeirão (III)	Estádio Senhor do Amparo, Porto
15:00	Zezé 24'			Referee: Arnaldo Araújo

11 January 2006	Pinhalnovense (III)	0–0 (4–5 p)	Vitória de Setúbal (I)	Campo de Jogos Santos Jorge, Pinhal Novo
15:00				Referee: Elmano Santos
	Penalties
	(penalty scored) (penalty scored) (penalty scored) (penalty scored); Chevela (penalty missed)		Penalty scored

11 January 2006	Portomosense (III)	0–2	Marítimo (I)	Parque de Jogos de Porto de Mós, Porto de Mós
15:00			Kanú 30'; Zé Carlos 48'	Referee: Jorge Sousa

11 January 2006	Sporting da Covilhã (III)	1–2	Vila Meã (IV)	Complexo Desportivo da Covilhã, Covilhã
15:00	Campos 90'		Viana 50'	Referee: Nuno Afonso

11 January 2006	Nacional (I)	2–0	Fátima (III)	Estádio da Madeira, Funchal
16:00	Alonso 69', 80'			Referee: Rui Costa

11 January 2006	Louletano (III)	0–0 (2–3 p)	Académica (I)	Estádio Algarve, Faro
18:00				Referee: Duarte Gomes
	Penalties
	Atabu (penalty missed); Della Pasqua (penalty scored); Clemente (penalty scored); Louzeiro (penalty missed); Dante (penalty missed)		(penalty missed) Luciano; (penalty missed) Dionattan; (penalty scored) Joeano; (penalty scored) Silva; (penalty scored) Brum

11 January 2006	Boavista (I)	3–0	Abrantes (III)	Estádio do Bessa, Porto
18:30	Paulo Jorge 62'; Figueredo 67'; Monteiro 78'			Referee: Paulo Pereira

11 January 2006	Desportivo das Aves (II)	1–1 (4–2 p)	Braga (I)	Estádio do CD das Aves, Vila das Aves
18:30	Miguel Pedro 99'		Rossato 107'	Referee: António Costa
	Penalties
	Penalty scored		(penalty scored) (penalty scored); (penalty missed) Sidney; (penalty missed) Nunes

11 January 2006	Souropires (IV)	1–3	Estrela Amadora (I)	Campo da Recta, Pinhel
19:30	Oliveira 83'		Duarte 60', 73'; Amoreirinha 70'	Referee: Augusto Duarte

11 January 2006	Sporting CP (I)	2–1	Vizela (II)	Estádio José Alvalade, Lisbon
20:00	Sá Pinto 59' (.pen), 84'		Dani 35'	Attendance: 7,891; Referee: Nuno Almeida

11 January 2006	Vitória de Guimarães (I)	4–0	Estoril (II)	Estádio D. Afonso Henriques, Guimarães
20:30	Cléber 18'; Dragóner 46'; Neca 60', 74'			Referee: Carlos Xistra

11 January 2006	Naval (I)	1–2	Porto (I)	Estádio Municipal José Bento Pessoa, Figueira da Foz
20:45	Saulo 47' (pen.)		Diego 60'; González 78' (pen.)	Referee: Bruno Paixão

== Sixth round ==
Ties were played on 8 February. Due to the odd number of games in the sixth round, Porto progressed to the quarter-finals due to having no opponent to face at this stage of the competition.

8 February 2006	Desportivo das Aves (II)	1–2	Académica (I)	Estádio do CD das Aves, Vila das Aves
15:00	Edu 39'		Vítor Manuel 21' (o.g.); Joeano 81'	Referee: João Vilas Boas

8 February 2006	Estrela Amadora (I)	0–1	Boavista (I)	Estádio José Gomes, Amadora
15:00			Rosário 35'	Referee: António Costa

8 February 2006	Lixa (III)	0–2	Vitória de Setúbal (I)	Estádio Senhor do Amparo, Felgueiras
15:00			Carlitos 81'; Varela 90'	Referee: Hélio Santos

8 February 2006	Sporting CP (I)	2–1	Paredes (III)	Estádio José Alvalade, Lisbon
17:00	Campos 5'		Koke 18'; Moutinho 90' (pen.)	Attendance: 10,241; Referee: Paulo Baptista

8 February 2006	Marítimo (I)	3–0	Vila Meã (IV)	Estádio dos Barreiros, Madeira
19:15	El Omari 23'; Kanú 61'; Ferreira 86'			Referee: Duarte Gomes

8 February 2006	Vitória de Guimarães (I)	2–0	Oliveirense (III)	Estádio D. Afonso Henriques, Guimarães
20:30	Antchouet 8'; Moreno 87' (pen.)			Attendance: 3,500; Referee: Jorge Sousa

8 February 2006	Benfica (I)	0–0 (a.e.t.) (5–3 p)	Nacional (I)	Estádio da Luz, Lisbon
20:45				Referee: João Ferreira
	Penalties
	Robert (penalty scored); Luisão (penalty scored); Karagounis (penalty scored); Marcel (penalty scored); Simão (penalty scored)		(penalty scored) Bruno; (penalty scored) Alonso; (penalty scored) Spadacio; (penalty missed) Patacas

== Quarter-finals ==
Ties were played on 15 March. All eight quarter-finalists were from the Primeira Liga.

15 March 2006	Vitória de Setúbal (I)	2–1 (a.e.t.)	Boavista (I)	Estádio do Bonfim, Setúbal
15:00	Varela 39'; Carlitos 108' (pen.)		Pinto 60'	Referee: Pedro Proença

15 March 2006	Marítimo (I)	1–2 (a.e.t.)	Porto (I)	Estádio dos Barreiros, Funchal
18:30	Kanú 33' (pen.)		McCarthy 22', 96'	Referee: Lucílio Baptista

15 March 2006	Académica (I)	0–2	Sporting CP (I)	Estádio Cidade de Coimbra, Coimbra
20:30			Deivid 51'; Nani 90+5'	Attendance: 14,605; Referee: Paulo Paraty

15 March 2006	Benfica (I)	0–1	Vitória de Guimarães (I)	Estádio da Luz, Lisbon
20:45			Dário 22'	Attendance: 22,727; Referee: Jorge Sousa

== Semi-finals ==
Ties were played on 22–23 March. All four semi-finalists were from the Primeira Liga.

22 March 2006	Porto (I)	1–1 (a.e.t.) (5–4 p)	Sporting CP (I)	Estádio do Dragão, Porto
20:45	McCarthy 115'		Liédson 108'	Attendance: 48,416; Referee: Olegário Benquerença
	Penalties
	González (penalty scored); McCarthy (penalty scored); R. Costa (penalty scored); Assunção (penalty scored); López (penalty scored)		(penalty missed) Moutinho; (penalty scored) Custódio; (penalty scored) Deivid; (penalty scored) Tello; (penalty scored) Ricardo

23 March 2006	Vitória de Setúbal (I)	1–1 (a.e.t.) (3–2 p)	Vitória de Guimarães (I)	Estádio do Bonfim, Setúbal
20:45	Auri 118'		Saganowski 110'	Attendance: 12,000; Referee: Paulo Paraty
	Penalties
	Auri (penalty scored); Adalto (penalty missed); Oliveira (penalty scored); Binho (penalty missed); Carlitos (penalty scored)		(penalty missed) Cléber; (penalty scored) Moreno; (penalty missed) Geromel; (penalty scored) Paíto; (penalty missed) Paulo Sérgio

== Final ==
14 May 2006
17:00 WEST

Porto	1–0	Vitória de Setúbal
Adriano 39'

Estádio Nacional, Oeiras
Attendance: 38,000
Referee: Duarte Gomes (Lisbon)
