= 2004–05 Segunda Divisão B =

Football competition

Segunda Divisão
- Season: 2004–05
- Champions: FC Vizela
- Promoted: SC Covilhã; FC Vizela; FC Barreirense
- Relegated: 12 teams

The 2004–05 Segunda Divisão season was the 71st season of the competition and the 58th season of recognised third-tier football in Portugal.

== Overview ==
The league was contested by 59 teams in 3 divisions with SC Covilhã, FC Vizela and FC Barreirense winning the respective divisional competitions and gaining promotion to the Liga de Honra. The overall championship was won by FC Vizela.

== League standings ==
=== Segunda Divisão – Zona Norte ===
| Pos | Team | Pld | W | D | L | GF | GA | GD | Pts | Promotion or relegation |
|---|---|---|---|---|---|---|---|---|---|---|
| 1 | FC Vizela | 38 | 24 | 8 | 6 | 69 | 30 | +39 | 80 | Promotion to Liga de Honra |
| 2 | Dragões Sandinenses | 38 | 21 | 10 | 7 | 66 | 40 | +26 | 73 | |
| 3 | FC Infesta | 38 | 21 | 8 | 9 | 68 | 45 | +23 | 71 | |
| 4 | SC Freamunde | 38 | 19 | 11 | 8 | 79 | 37 | +42 | 68 | |
| 5 | FC Porto B | 38 | 20 | 6 | 12 | 63 | 33 | +30 | 66 | |
| 6 | Vilaverdense | 38 | 18 | 9 | 11 | 51 | 36 | +15 | 63 | |
| 7 | SC Braga B | 38 | 18 | 8 | 12 | 68 | 48 | +20 | 62 | |
| 8 | Lixa FC | 38 | 17 | 6 | 15 | 45 | 44 | +1 | 57 | |
| 9 | AD Fafe | 38 | 15 | 10 | 13 | 46 | 42 | +4 | 55 | |
| 10 | GD Ribeirão | 38 | 17 | 3 | 18 | 49 | 51 | −2 | 54 | |
| 11 | Fiães SC | 38 | 15 | 8 | 15 | 55 | 44 | +11 | 53 | |
| 12 | CDA Valdevez | 38 | 15 | 8 | 15 | 53 | 42 | +11 | 53 | |
| 13 | FC Pedras Rubras | 38 | 14 | 11 | 13 | 46 | 48 | −2 | 53 | |
| 14 | AD Lousada | 38 | 14 | 10 | 14 | 60 | 51 | +9 | 52 | |
| 15 | CD Trofense | 38 | 13 | 10 | 15 | 46 | 48 | −2 | 49 | |
| 16 | União Paredes | 38 | 13 | 6 | 19 | 42 | 57 | −15 | 45 | |
| 17 | União Lamas | 38 | 12 | 7 | 19 | 33 | 54 | −21 | 43 | Relegation to Terceira Divisão |
| 18 | SC Valenciano | 38 | 10 | 6 | 22 | 31 | 57 | −26 | 36 | Relegation to Terceira Divisão |
| 19 | Vilanovense FC | 38 | 7 | 5 | 26 | 29 | 85 | −56 | 26 | Relegation to Terceira Divisão |
| 20 | SC Salgueiros | 38 | 1 | 2 | 35 | 19 | 126 | −107 | 5 | Relegation to Terceira Divisão |

=== Segunda Divisão – Zona Centro ===
| Pos | Team | Pld | W | D | L | GF | GA | GD | Pts | Promotion or relegation |
|---|---|---|---|---|---|---|---|---|---|---|
| 1 | SC Covilhã | 36 | 19 | 12 | 5 | 61 | 32 | +29 | 69 | Promotion to Liga de Honra |
| 2 | CD Mafra | 36 | 17 | 14 | 5 | 47 | 28 | +19 | 65 | |
| 3 | Académico Viseu | 36 | 19 | 7 | 10 | 52 | 34 | +18 | 64 | |
| 4 | CD Fátima | 36 | 14 | 14 | 8 | 56 | 40 | +16 | 56 | |
| 5 | AD Sanjoanense | 36 | 14 | 11 | 11 | 46 | 40 | +6 | 53 | |
| 6 | SCU Torreense | 36 | 14 | 10 | 12 | 51 | 37 | +14 | 52 | |
| 7 | GD Tourizense | 36 | 13 | 12 | 11 | 56 | 44 | +12 | 51 | |
| 8 | Abrantes FC | 36 | 14 | 9 | 13 | 47 | 44 | +3 | 51 | |
| 9 | Benfica Castelo Branco | 36 | 13 | 11 | 12 | 50 | 43 | +7 | 50 | |
| 10 | SC Esmoriz | 36 | 12 | 14 | 10 | 45 | 50 | −5 | 50 | |
| 11 | SC Penalva do Castelo | 36 | 13 | 9 | 14 | 41 | 42 | −1 | 48 | |
| 12 | Oliveira do Bairro | 36 | 12 | 12 | 12 | 51 | 51 | 0 | 48 | |
| 13 | UD Oliveirense | 36 | 12 | 12 | 12 | 59 | 45 | +14 | 48 | |
| 14 | Oliveira do Hospital | 36 | 11 | 12 | 13 | 41 | 49 | −8 | 45 | |
| 15 | SC Pombal | 36 | 11 | 10 | 15 | 33 | 46 | −13 | 43 | |
| 16 | FC Pampilhosa | 36 | 10 | 12 | 14 | 37 | 49 | −12 | 42 | |
| 17 | CD Estarreja | 36 | 9 | 10 | 17 | 35 | 51 | −16 | 37 | Relegation to Terceira Divisão |
| 18 | Caldas SC | 36 | 9 | 8 | 19 | 34 | 61 | −27 | 35 | Relegation to Terceira Divisão |
| 19 | UD Vilafranquense | 36 | 4 | 5 | 27 | 25 | 81 | −56 | 17 | Relegation to Terceira Divisão |

CD Alcains Withdrew

=== Segunda Divisão – Zona Sul ===
| Pos | Team | Pld | W | D | L | GF | GA | GD | Pts | Promotion or relegation |
|---|---|---|---|---|---|---|---|---|---|---|
| 1 | FC Barreirense | 38 | 21 | 10 | 7 | 52 | 31 | +21 | 73 | Promotion to Liga de Honra |
| 2 | CD Pinhalnovense | 38 | 20 | 12 | 6 | 51 | 25 | +26 | 72 | |
| 3 | União Funchal | 38 | 18 | 9 | 11 | 47 | 38 | +9 | 63 | |
| 4 | CD Portosantense | 38 | 18 | 9 | 11 | 44 | 38 | +6 | 63 | |
| 5 | Casa Pia AC | 38 | 17 | 8 | 13 | 56 | 44 | +12 | 59 | |
| 6 | Operário Açores | 38 | 16 | 10 | 12 | 42 | 33 | +9 | 58 | |
| 7 | AD Camacha | 38 | 15 | 11 | 12 | 51 | 45 | +6 | 56 | |
| 8 | CD Olivais e Moscavide | 38 | 14 | 12 | 12 | 48 | 39 | +9 | 54 | |
| 9 | Odivelas FC | 38 | 16 | 5 | 17 | 50 | 51 | −1 | 53 | |
| 10 | Marítimo Funchal B | 38 | 14 | 9 | 15 | 53 | 49 | +4 | 51 | |
| 11 | União Micaelense | 38 | 13 | 12 | 13 | 34 | 38 | −4 | 51 | |
| 12 | Louletano DC | 38 | 13 | 10 | 15 | 49 | 43 | +6 | 49 | |
| 13 | SC Lusitânia | 38 | 12 | 12 | 14 | 42 | 42 | 0 | 48 | |
| 14 | Oriental Lisboa | 38 | 11 | 15 | 12 | 36 | 41 | −5 | 48 | |
| 15 | AD Pontassolense | 38 | 14 | 6 | 18 | 47 | 60 | −13 | 48 | |
| 16 | CD Ribeira Brava | 38 | 14 | 5 | 19 | 43 | 44 | −1 | 47 | |
| 17 | Atlético CP | 38 | 12 | 11 | 15 | 47 | 58 | −11 | 47 | Relegation to Terceira Divisão |
| 18 | Estrela Vendas Novas | 38 | 10 | 12 | 16 | 34 | 49 | −15 | 42 | Relegation to Terceira Divisão |
| 19 | Vasco da Gama AC Sines | 38 | 5 | 14 | 19 | 24 | 52 | −28 | 29 | Relegation to Terceira Divisão |
| 20 | Amora FC | 38 | 6 | 10 | 22 | 37 | 67 | −30 | 28 | Relegation to Terceira Divisão |
