= 2008–09 Segunda Divisão =

Segunda Divisão
- Season: 2008–09
- Champions: CD Fátima
- Promoted: GD Chaves; FC Penafiel; CD Fátima; AD Carregado
- Relegated: 15 teams

The 2008–09 Segunda Divisão season was the 75th season of the competition and the 62nd season of recognised third-tier football in Portugal.

== Overview ==
The league was contested by 47 teams in 4 divisions with GD Chaves, FC Penafiel, CD Fátima and AD Carregado winning the respective divisional competitions and gaining promotion to the Liga de Honra. The overall championship was won by CD Fátima.

== League standings ==
=== Série A ===
Pos	Team	Pld	W	D	L	GF	GA	GD	Pts	Qualification
1	GD Chaves	22	13	5	4	40	18	+22	44	Qualification to promotion group
2	FC Tirsense	22	10	8	4	31	23	+8	38	Qualification to promotion group
3	Moreirense FC	22	11	4	7	30	19	+11	37	Qualification to promotion group
4	Marítimo Funchal B	22	9	7	6	30	22	+8	34	Qualification to promotion group
5	AD Pontassolense	22	8	9	5	33	29	+4	33	Qualification to promotion group
6	CDA Valdevez	22	8	9	5	20	17	+3	33	Qualification to promotion group
7	CD Ribeira Brava	22	8	7	7	23	21	+2	31	Qualification to relegation group
8	GD Ribeirão	22	8	5	9	25	26	−1	29	Qualification to relegation group
9	SC Vianense	22	4	9	9	21	34	−13	21	Qualification to relegation group
10	CF Caniçal	22	5	5	12	19	35	−16	20	Qualification to relegation group
11	Maria da Fonte	22	3	9	10	19	34	−15	18	Qualification to relegation group
12	SC Mirandela	22	3	7	12	16	29	−13	16	Qualification to relegation group

=== Série A Promotion Group ===
Pos	Team	Pld	W	D	L	GF	GA	GD	Pts	Promotion
1	GD Chaves	10	6	3	1	13	4	+9	43	Promotion to Liga de Honra
2	Moreirense FC	10	7	0	3	16	13	+3	40	
3	FC Tirsense	10	4	4	2	15	12	+3	35	
4	Marítimo Funchal B	10	2	4	4	11	15	−4	27	
5	AD Pontassolense	10	1	5	4	14	17	−3	25	
6	CDA Valdevez	10	1	2	7	10	18	−8	22	

=== Série A Relegation Group ===
Pos	Team	Pld	W	D	L	GF	GA	GD	Pts	Relegation
1	GD Ribeirão	10	4	5	1	14	9	+5	32	
2	SC Vianense	10	4	4	2	9	6	+3	27	
3	CD Ribeira Brava	10	2	4	4	10	12	−2	26	Relegation to Terceira Divisão
4	CF Caniçal	10	3	3	4	15	14	+1	22	Relegation to Terceira Divisão
5	Maria da Fonte	10	3	4	3	13	17	−4	22	Relegation to Terceira Divisão
6	SC Mirandela	10	1	6	3	8	11	−3	17	Relegation to Terceira Divisão

=== Série B ===
Pos	Team	Pld	W	D	L	GF	GA	GD	Pts	Qualification
1	FC Penafiel	22	15	5	2	31	13	+18	50	Qualification to promotion group
2	União Funchal	22	14	5	3	38	15	+23	47	Qualification to promotion group
3	SC Espinho	22	11	5	6	36	24	+12	38	Qualification to promotion group
4	Lusitânia Lourosa	22	9	6	7	25	23	+2	33	Qualification to promotion group
5	Aliados Lordelo	22	8	8	6	26	21	+5	32	Qualification to promotion group
6	SC Esmoriz	22	9	4	9	28	22	+6	31	Qualification to promotion group
7	FC Arouca	22	9	2	11	26	23	+3	29	Qualification to relegation group
8	AD Lousada	22	5	10	7	23	29	−6	25	Qualification to relegation group
9	Amarante FC	22	6	5	11	24	41	−17	23	Qualification to relegation group
10	Santana	22	4	10	8	25	36	−11	22	Qualification to relegation group
11	Sanjoanense	22	2	9	11	14	33	−19	15	Qualification to relegation group
12	Infesta	22	4	3	15	16	32	−16	15	Qualification to relegation group

=== Série B Promotion Group ===
Pos	Team	Pld	W	D	L	GF	GA	GD	Pts	Promotion
1	FC Penafiel	10	5	5	0	11	4	+7	45	Promotion to Liga de Honra
2	União Funchal	10	5	5	0	20	9	+11	44	
3	SC Espinho	10	3	5	2	10	8	+2	33	
4	Lusitânia Lourosa	10	3	1	6	12	20	−8	27	
5	SC Esmoriz	10	1	5	4	5	9	−4	24	
6	Aliados Lordelo	10	0	5	5	4	12	−8	21	

=== Série B Relegation Group ===
Pos	Team	Pld	W	D	L	GF	GA	GD	Pts	Relegation
1	FC Arouca	10	5	1	4	12	13	−1	31	
2	UD Santana	10	5	3	2	19	11	+8	29	
3	AD Lousada	10	4	1	5	11	10	+1	26	Relegation to Terceira Divisão
4	InfestA FC	10	4	4	2	12	11	+1	24	Relegation to Terceira Divisão
5	Amarante FC	10	3	3	4	14	18	−4	24	Relegation to Terceira Divisão
6	AD Sanjoanense	10	2	2	6	9	14	−5	16	Relegation to Terceira Divisão

=== Série C ===
Pos	Team	Pld	W	D	L	GF	GA	GD	Pts	Qualification
1	CD Fátima	20	12	6	2	33	18	+15	42	Qualification to promotion group
2	União da Serra	20	11	6	3	36	17	+19	39	Qualification to promotion group
3	FC Pampilhosa	20	11	4	5	27	20	+7	37	Qualification to promotion group
4	GD Tourizense	20	10	5	5	30	18	+12	35	Qualification to promotion group
5	Operário Açores	20	8	6	6	28	23	+5	30	Qualification to promotion group
6	GDR Monsanto	20	6	11	3	25	21	+4	29	Qualification to promotion group
7	Oliveira do Bairro SC	20	8	5	7	24	26	−2	29	Qualification to relegation group
8	Eléctrico FC	20	5	6	9	21	35	−14	21	Qualification to relegation group
9	SC Penalva do Castelo	20	3	6	11	19	29	−10	15	Qualification to relegation group
10	SL Nelas	20	1	7	12	13	27	−14	10	Qualification to relegation group
11	Praiense SC	20	2	4	14	20	42	−22	10	Qualification to relegation group

=== Série C Promotion Group ===
Pos	Team	Pld	W	D	L	GF	GA	GD	Pts	Promotion
1	CD Fátima	10	8	2	0	26	9	+17	47	Promotion to Liga de Honra
2	GD Tourizense	10	4	3	3	13	11	+2	33	
3	União da Serra	10	3	2	5	7	14	−7	31	
4	FC Pampilhosa	10	2	4	4	10	15	−5	29	
5	Operário Açores	10	4	1	5	15	15	0	28	
6	GDR Monsanto	10	2	2	6	11	18	−7	23	

=== Série C Relegation Group ===
Pos	Team	Pld	W	D	L	GF	GA	GD	Pts	Relegation
1	Eléctrico FC	8	3	4	1	5	3	+2	24	
2	Oliveira do Bairro SC	8	2	3	3	8	9	−1	24	
3	Praiense SC	8	4	2	2	11	9	+2	19	Relegation to Terceira Divisão
4	SC Penalva do Castelo	8	3	2	3	7	5	+2	19	Relegation to Terceira Divisão
5	SL Nelas	8	0	5	3	3	8	−5	10	Relegation to Terceira Divisão

=== Série D ===
Pos	Team	Pld	W	D	L	GF	GA	GD	Pts	Qualification
1	AD Carregado	22	11	5	6	31	18	+13	38	Qualification to promotion group
2	GD Lagoa	22	10	6	6	27	20	+7	36	Qualification to promotion group
3	CD Pinhalnovense	22	9	6	7	23	20	+3	33	Qualification to promotion group
4	Real SC	22	9	4	9	28	27	+1	31	Qualification to promotion group
5	Odivelas FC	22	8	7	7	29	27	+2	31	Qualification to promotion group
6	Atlético CP	22	9	4	9	31	33	−2	31	Qualification to promotion group
7	CD Mafra	22	8	6	8	20	20	0	30	Qualification to relegation group
8	Oriental Lisboa	22	9	3	10	27	35	−8	30	Qualification to relegation group
9	CD Olivais e Moscavide	22	7	8	7	18	17	+1	29	Qualification to relegation group
10	Mineiro Aljustrelense	22	6	8	8	22	25	−3	26	Qualification to relegation group
11	SCU Torreense	22	6	7	9	24	27	−3	25	Qualification to relegation group
12	GD Beira-Mar	22	5	6	11	17	28	−11	21	Qualification to relegation group

=== Série D Promotion Group ===
Pos	Team	Pld	W	D	L	GF	GA	GD	Pts	Promotion
1	AD Carregado	10	6	2	2	11	6	+5	39	Promotion to Liga de Honra
2	GD Lagoa	10	6	1	3	14	8	+6	37	
3	Atlético CP	10	5	2	3	11	7	+4	33	
4	Real SC	10	4	4	2	9	5	+4	32	
5	Odivelas FC	10	1	3	6	7	16	−9	22	
6	CD Pinhalnovense	10	1	2	7	6	16	−10	22	

=== Série D Relegation Group ===
Pos	Team	Pld	W	D	L	GF	GA	GD	Pts	Relegation
1	Oriental Lisboa	10	7	0	3	19	13	+6	36	
2	CD Mafra	10	5	2	3	16	12	+4	32	
3	Mineiro Aljustrelense	10	5	3	2	23	16	+7	31	Relegation to Terceira Divisão
4	CD Olivais e Moscavide	10	5	1	4	13	14	−1	29	Relegation to Terceira Divisão
5	GD Beira-Mar	10	3	1	6	9	15	−6	22	Relegation to Terceira Divisão
6	SCU Torreense	10	1	1	8	9	19	−10	17	Relegation to Terceira Divisão

== Championship playoffs ==
=== Semi-finals ===
Tie no	Home team	Score	Away team
1st leg	FC Penafiel	0–0	GD Chaves
2nd leg	GD Chaves	1–0	FC Penafiel

Tie no	Home team	Score	Away team
1st leg	AD Carregado	1–1	CD Fátima
2nd leg	CD Fátima	4–1	AD Carregado

=== Final ===
The final was played on 5 May 2009 in Águeda.

Tie no	Team 1	Score	Team 2
Final	GD Chaves	1–2	CD Fátima
