= 2005–06 Segunda Divisão =

Segunda Divisão
- Season: 2005–06
- Champions: CD Olivais e Moscavide
- Promoted: CD Trofense; CD Olivais e Moscavide
- Relegated: 13 teams

The 2005–06 Segunda Divisão season was the 72nd season of the competition and the 59th season of recognised third-tier football in Portugal.

== Overview ==
The league was contested by 58 teams in 4 divisions with CD Trofense, AD Lousada, UD Oliveirense and CD Olivais e Moscavide winning the respective divisional competitions and progressing to the championship playoffs. The overall championship was won by CD Olivais e Moscavide and the runners-up CD Trofense were also promoted to the Liga de Honra.

== League standings ==
=== Série A ===
Pos	Team	Pld	W	D	L	GF	GA	GD	Pts	Qualification or relegation
1	CD Trofense	26	15	7	4	44	22	+22	52	Championship Playoffs
2	União Funchal	26	13	6	7	28	17	+11	45	
3	AD Camacha	26	12	6	8	47	29	+18	42	
4	GD Ribeirão	26	11	8	7	18	15	+3	41	
5	AD Fafe	26	10	8	8	26	27	−1	38	
6	FC Famalicão	26	9	10	7	30	29	+1	37	
7	Os Sandinenses	26	9	10	7	25	24	+1	37	
8	CD Portosantense	26	9	8	9	21	22	−1	35	
9	SC Braga B	26	9	7	10	24	23	+1	34	
10	Lixa FC	26	10	4	12	24	30	−6	34	
11	SC Freamunde	26	8	9	9	25	20	+5	33	
12	CDA Valdevez	26	9	6	11	28	35	−7	33	Relegation to Terceira Divisão
13	Vilaverdense	26	7	3	16	26	42	−16	24	Relegation to Terceira Divisão
14	União Torcatense	26	3	4	19	18	49	−31	13	Relegation to Terceira Divisão

Source: Portugal – Table of Honor – soccerlibrary.free.fr (PDF)

=== Série B ===
Pos	Team	Pld	W	D	L	GF	GA	GD	Pts	Qualification or relegation
1	AD Lousada	26	15	6	5	39	22	+17	51	Championship Playoffs
2	SC Espinho	26	12	11	3	31	16	+15	47	
3	Dragões Sandinenses	26	13	6	7	39	24	+15	45	
4	União Paredes	26	11	6	9	33	31	+2	39	
5	Infesta FC	26	10	9	7	32	32	0	39	
6	FC Porto B	26	10	8	8	28	27	+1	38	
7	CD Ribeira Brava	26	9	9	8	30	33	−3	36	
8	SC Esmoriz	26	9	7	10	32	34	−2	34	
9	AD Pontassolense	26	10	2	14	34	32	+2	32	
10	Marítimo Funchal B	26	9	5	12	34	34	0	32	
11	Fiães SC	26	7	9	10	30	32	−2	30	
12	Aliados Lordelo	26	7	8	11	26	39	−13	29	Relegation to Terceira Divisão
13	FC Pedras Rubras	26	7	4	15	20	37	−17	25	Relegation to Terceira Divisão
14	AD Sanjoanense	26	4	8	14	25	40	−15	20	Relegation to Terceira Divisão

Source: Portugal – Table of Honor – soccerlibrary.free.fr (PDF)

=== Série C ===
Pos	Team	Pld	W	D	L	GF	GA	GD	Pts	Qualification or relegation
1	UD Oliveirense	26	17	5	4	52	26	+26	56	Championship Playoffs
2	CD Fátima	26	14	8	4	41	18	+23	50	
3	GD Tourizense	26	14	5	7	38	22	+16	47	
4	FC Pampilhosa	26	12	8	6	36	29	+7	44	
5	Abrantes FC	26	13	5	8	38	33	+5	44	
6	SL Nelas	26	9	10	7	32	28	+4	37	
7	SC Pombal	26	9	7	10	34	29	+5	34	
8	UD Rio Maior	26	8	10	8	32	32	0	34	
9	SC Penalva do Castelo	26	9	6	11	30	40	−10	33	
10	Oliveira do Bairro	26	6	12	8	34	35	−1	30	
11	AD Portomosense	26	5	12	9	26	27	−1	27	
12	Benfica Castelo Branco	26	5	9	12	26	42	−16	24	Relegation to Terceira Divisão
13	União Coimbra	26	6	3	17	24	51	−27	21	Relegation to Terceira Divisão
14	Oliveira do Hospital	26	2	6	18	22	53	−31	12	Relegation to Terceira Divisão

Source: Portugal – Table of Honor – soccerlibrary.free.fr (PDF)

=== Série D ===
Pos	Team	Pld	W	D	L	GF	GA	GD	Pts	Qualification or relegation
1	CD Olivais e Moscavide	30	15	9	6	41	24	+17	54	Championship Playoffs
2	Louletano DC	30	15	7	8	55	32	+23	52	
3	CD Pinhalnovense	30	15	7	8	35	26	+9	52	
4	Operário Açores	30	15	6	9	42	32	+10	51	
5	FC Madalena	30	15	5	10	32	35	−3	50	
6	Odivelas FC	30	15	4	11	39	35	+4	49	
7	CD Mafra	30	13	8	9	45	38	+7	47	
8	SCU Torreense	30	13	4	13	37	35	+2	43	
9	Imortal DC	30	12	6	12	50	38	+12	42	
10	União Micaelense	30	11	8	11	32	30	+2	41	
11	S.L. Benfica B	30	11	8	11	40	40	0	41	
12	RSC Queluz	30	12	5	13	38	40	−2	41	
13	Casa Pia AC	30	12	5	13	45	50	−5	41	Relegation to Terceira Divisão
14	Vitória Setúbal B	30	10	6	14	36	42	−6	36	Relegation to Terceira Divisão
15	Silves FC	30	5	6	19	34	58	−24	21	Relegation to Terceira Divisão
16	Oriental Lisboa	30	1	6	23	19	65	−46	9	Relegation to Terceira Divisão

Source: Portugal – Table of Honor – soccerlibrary.free.fr (PDF)

== Championship playoffs ==
=== Semi-finals ===
Tie no	Home team	Score	Away team
1st leg	AD Lousada	1–2	CD Trofense
2nd leg	CD Trofense	0–1 (8-7 pens)	AD Lousada

Tie no	Home team	Score	Away team
1st leg	CD Olivais e Moscavide	1–0	UD Oliveirense
2nd leg	UD Oliveirense	2–2	CD Olivais e Moscavide

=== Final ===
The final was played on 28 May 2006 in Marinha Grande.

Tie no	Team 1	Score	Team 2
Final	CD Trofense	0–1	CD Olivais e Moscavide
