= 2007–08 Segunda Divisão =

Segunda Divisão
- Season: 2007–08
- Champions: UD Oliveirense
- Promoted: UD Oliveirense; SC Covilhã
- Relegated: 19 teams

The 2007–08 Segunda Divisão season was the 74th season of the competition and the 61st season of recognised third-tier football in Portugal.

== Overview ==
The league was contested by 55 teams in 4 divisions with GD Ribeirão, UD Oliveirense, SC Covilhã and CD Olivais e Moscavide winning the respective divisional competitions and progressing to the championship playoffs. The overall championship was won by UD Oliveirense and the runners-up SC Covilhã were also promoted to the Liga de Honra.

== League standings ==
=== Série A ===
Pos	Team	Pld	W	D	L	GF	GA	GD	Pts
1	União da Madeira	26	15	6	5	43	17	+26	51
2	Tirsense	26	15	5	6	37	25	+12	50
3	Valdevez	26	12	9	5	31	17	+14	45
4	Chaves	26	12	8	6	29	17	+12	44
5	Ribeirão	26	13	5	8	39	32	+7	44
6	Lousada	26	11	8	7	22	19	+3	41
7	Maria da Fonte	26	12	4	10	34	29	+5	40
8	Moreirense	26	11	6	9	33	25	+8	39
9	Camacha	26	11	6	9	35	26	+9	39
10	Portosantense	26	8	11	7	31	22	+9	35
11	Fafe	26	9	5	12	24	30	−6	32
12	Merelinense	26	6	5	15	24	36	−12	23
13	Machico	26	4	5	17	13	34	−21	17
14	Lixa	26	1	1	24	11	77	−66	4

==== Série A Promotion Group ====
Pos	Team	Pld	W	D	L	GF	GA	GD	Pts	Promotion or qualification
1	Ribeirão	10	7	0	3	18	6	+12	43	Promotion to Championship Playoffs
2	Chaves	10	6	2	2	18	11	+7	42	
3	União da Madeira	10	3	3	4	14	13	+1	38	
4	Tirsense	10	3	3	4	7	10	−3	37	
5	Lousada	10	2	4	4	7	13	−6	31	
6	Valdevez	10	1	4	5	7	18	−11	30	

==== Série A Relegation Group 1 ====
Pos	Team	Pld	W	D	L	GF	GA	GD	Pts	Relegation
1	Camacha	6	2	3	1	8	4	+4	29	
2	Fafe	6	4	1	1	6	6	0	29	
3	Maria da Fonte	6	2	1	3	6	6	0	27	Relegation to Terceira Divisão
4	Machico	6	1	1	4	3	7	−4	13	Relegation to Terceira Divisão

==== Série A Relegation Group 2 ====
Pos	Team	Pld	W	D	L	GF	GA	GD	Pts	Relegation
1	Moreirense	6	4	2	0	8	1	+7	34	
2	Portosantense	5	3	1	1	9	6	+3	28	
3	Merelinense	5	3	1	1	6	2	+4	22	Relegation to Terceira Divisão
4	Lixa	6	0	0	6	2	16	−14	2	Relegation to Terceira Divisão

=== Série B ===
Pos	Team	Pld	W	D	L	GF	GA	GD	Pts
1	Oliveirense	24	20	4	0	55	13	+42	64
2	Sporting de Espinho	24	11	9	4	38	26	+12	42
3	Caniçal	24	9	12	3	36	27	+9	39
4	Ribeira Brava	24	10	7	7	26	26	0	37
5	Pontassolense	24	8	9	7	31	31	0	33
6	Marítimo B	24	8	7	9	38	37	+1	31
7	Infesta	24	8	7	9	31	37	−6	31
8	Esmoriz	24	8	5	11	31	31	0	29
9	Vila Meã	24	6	8	10	31	35	−4	26
10	Leça	24	6	7	11	32	41	−9	25
11	Fiães	24	5	7	12	20	35	−15	22
12	Lusitânia Lourosa	24	4	9	11	22	37	−15	21
13	Avanca	24	4	7	13	24	39	−15	19

==== Série B Promotion Group ====
Pos	Team	Pld	W	D	L	GF	GA	GD	Pts	Promotion or qualification
1	Oliveirense	10	4	4	2	10	9	+1	48	Promotion to Championship Playoffs
2	Pontassolense	10	6	3	1	14	6	+8	38	
3	Sporting de Espinho	10	4	1	5	13	13	0	34	
4	Caniçal	10	3	4	3	11	12	−1	33	
5	Marítimo B	10	2	5	3	9	9	0	27	
6	Ribeira Brava	10	2	1	7	5	13	−8	26	

==== Série B Relegation Group 1 ====
Pos	Team	Pld	W	D	L	GF	GA	GD	Pts	Relegation
1	Infesta	6	3	1	2	9	7	+2	26	
2	Vila Meã	6	2	2	2	6	7	−1	21	
3	Fiães	6	2	2	2	7	8	−1	19	Relegation to Terceira Divisão
4	Avanca	6	2	1	3	12	12	0	17	Relegation to Terceira Divisão

==== Série B Relegation Group 2 ====
Pos	Team	Pld	W	D	L	GF	GA	GD	Pts	Relegation
1	Esmoriz	4	2	0	2	5	6	−1	21	
2	Lusitânia Lourosa	4	3	0	1	6	4	+2	20	
3	Leça	4	1	0	3	4	5	−1	16	Relegation to Terceira Divisão

=== Série C ===
Pos	Team	Pld	W	D	L	GF	GA	GD	Pts
1	Sporting da Covilhã	26	17	4	5	49	20	+29	55
2	Tourizense	26	12	9	5	40	23	+17	45
3	Eléctrico	26	12	7	7	33	26	+7	43
4	Oliveira do Bairro	26	12	6	8	40	29	+11	42
5	Pampilhosa	26	10	11	5	33	27	+6	41
6	Penalva do Castelo	26	11	8	7	36	31	+5	41
7	Torreense	26	12	5	9	38	34	+4	41
8	Abrantes	26	9	7	10	26	29	−3	34
9	Anadia	26	8	6	12	26	40	−14	30
10	Nelas	26	9	3	14	32	38	−6	30
11	Benfica e Castelo Branco	26	8	6	12	23	35	−12	30
12	Rio Maior	26	6	8	12	17	28	−11	26
13	Sátão	26	5	6	15	22	39	−17	21
14	Caldas	26	4	8	14	23	39	−16	20

==== Série C Promotion Group ====
Pos	Team	Pld	W	D	L	GF	GA	GD	Pts	Promotion or qualification
1	Sporting da Covilhã	10	5	3	2	10	6	+4	46	Promotion to Championship Playoffs
2	Tourizense	10	5	1	4	10	8	+2	39	
3	Pampilhosa	10	4	4	2	15	12	+3	37	
4	Oliveira do Bairro	10	4	3	3	15	15	0	36	
5	Eléctrico	10	4	2	4	14	12	+2	36	
6	Penalva do Castelo	10	0	3	7	8	19	−11	24	

==== Série C Relegation Group 1 ====
Pos	Team	Pld	W	D	L	GF	GA	GD	Pts	Relegation
1	Torreense	6	2	1	3	9	12	−3	28	
2	Benfica e Castelo Branco	6	3	2	1	9	8	+1	26	
3	Anadia	6	2	3	1	14	9	+5	24	Relegation to Terceira Divisão
4	Sátão	6	1	2	3	5	8	−3	16	Relegation to Terceira Divisão

==== Série C Relegation Group 2 ====
Pos	Team	Pld	W	D	L	GF	GA	GD	Pts	Relegation
1	Abrantes	6	3	2	1	9	7	+2	28	
2	Nelas	6	3	2	1	11	7	+4	26	
3	Rio Maior	6	1	3	2	5	7	−2	19	Relegation to Terceira Divisão
4	Caldas	6	1	1	4	3	11	−8	14	Relegation to Terceira Divisão

=== Série D ===
Pos	Team	Pld	W	D	L	GF	GA	GD	Pts
1	Olivais e Moscavide	26	18	7	1	39	13	+26	61
2	Operário	26	16	5	5	29	17	+12	53
3	Carregado	26	12	7	7	30	28	+2	43
4	Atlético CP	26	11	8	7	27	19	+8	41
5	Mafra	26	12	5	9	35	23	+12	41
6	Lagoa	26	10	8	8	27	23	+4	38
7	Odivelas	26	9	10	7	26	21	+5	37
8	Louletano	26	11	4	11	28	30	−2	37
9	Pinhalnovense	26	10	6	10	30	31	−1	36
10	Madalena	26	10	3	13	30	38	−8	33
11	Messinense	26	8	7	11	32	34	−2	31
12	Real	26	8	5	13	28	32	−4	29
13	Juventude de Évora	26	3	4	19	19	42	−23	13
14	Lusitânia	26	3	3	20	17	46	−29	12

==== Série D Promotion Group ====
Pos	Team	Pld	W	D	L	GF	GA	GD	Pts	Promotion or qualification
1	Olivais e Moscavide	10	9	1	0	20	4	+16	59	Promotion to Championship Playoffs
2	Operário	10	4	1	5	13	18	−5	40	
3	Atlético CP	10	4	3	3	9	8	+1	36	
4	Carregado	10	3	2	5	9	12	−3	33	
5	Lagoa	10	2	4	4	8	11	−3	29	
6	Mafra	10	2	1	7	7	13	−6	28	

==== Série D Relegation Group 1 ====
Pos	Team	Pld	W	D	L	GF	GA	GD	Pts	Relegation
1	Odivelas	6	4	1	1	11	3	+8	32	
2	Pinhalnovense	6	3	3	0	9	3	+6	30	
3	Messinense	6	0	3	3	4	14	−10	19	Relegation to Terceira Divisão
4	Juventude de Évora	6	0	3	3	5	9	−4	10	Relegation to Terceira Divisão

==== Série D Relegation Group 2 ====
Pos	Team	Pld	W	D	L	GF	GA	GD	Pts	Relegation
1	Real	6	5	1	0	16	4	+12	31	
2	Madalena	6	3	1	2	7	8	−1	27	
3	Louletano	6	2	2	2	6	5	+1	27	Relegation to Terceira Divisão
4	Lusitânia	6	0	0	6	3	15	−12	6	Relegation to Terceira Divisão

== Championship Playoffs ==
=== Semi-finals ===
Tie no	Home team	Score	Away team
1st leg	Oliveirense	1–1	Ribeirão
2nd leg	Ribeirão	1–2	Oliveirense

Tie no	Home team	Score	Away team
1st leg	Sporting da Covilhã	1–0	Olivais e Moscavide
2nd leg	Olivais e Moscavide	2–1 (2–4p)	Sporting da Covilhã

=== Final ===
The final was played on 22 June 2008 in Pombal.

Tie no	Team 1	Score	Team 2
Final	Sporting da Covilhã	0–1	Oliveirense
