= 1997–98 Segunda Divisão B =

Segunda Divisão
- Season: 1997–98
- Champions: CD Santa Clara
- Promoted: Naval 1º Maio; AD Esposende; CD Santa Clara
- Relegated: 12 teams

The 1997–98 Segunda Divisão season was the 64th season of the competition and the 51st season of recognised third-tier football in Portugal.

== Overview ==
The league was contested by 54 teams in 3 divisions with Naval 1º Maio, AD Esposende and CD Santa Clara winning the respective divisional competitions and gaining promotion to the Liga de Honra. The overall championship was won by CD Santa Clara.

== League standings ==
=== Segunda Divisão – Zona Norte ===
Pos	Team	Pld	W	D	L	GF	GA	GD	Pts	Promotion or relegation
1	AD Esposende	34	21	8	5	70	41	+29	71	Promotion to Liga de Honra
2	SC Vila Real	34	19	8	7	74	51	+23	65	
3	CD Trofense	34	16	9	9	53	34	+19	57	
4	Infesta FC	34	16	9	9	52	41	+11	57	
5	Leixões SC	34	15	11	8	48	32	+16	56	
6	FC Marco	34	13	11	10	51	41	+10	50	
7	GD Ribeirão	34	12	12	10	53	42	+11	48	
8	Gondomar SC	34	14	6	14	50	53	−3	48	
9	Os Sandinenses	34	11	14	9	35	27	+8	47	
10	FC Famalicão	34	13	7	14	48	55	−7	46	
11	Lusitânia Lourosa	34	12	10	12	43	41	+2	46	
12	FC Vizela	34	13	6	15	42	44	−2	45	
13	Lixa FC	34	11	11	12	39	48	−9	44	
14	SC Vianense	34	12	6	16	38	48	−10	42	
15	AD Lousada	34	9	14	11	37	41	−4	41	Relegation to Terceira Divisão
16	SC Esmoriz	34	8	10	16	40	51	−11	34	Relegation to Terceira Divisão
17	SC Valenciano	34	5	7	22	26	62	−36	22	Relegation to Terceira Divisão
18	FC Tirsense	34	4	5	25	26	73	−47	17	Relegation to Terceira Divisão

=== Segunda Divisão – Zona Centro ===
Pos	Team	Pld	W	D	L	GF	GA	GD	Pts	Promotion or relegation
1	Naval 1º Maio	34	20	9	5	52	22	+30	69	Promotion to Liga de Honra
2	SC Covilhã	34	20	7	7	67	26	+41	67	
3	AD Sanjoanense	34	17	11	6	46	19	+27	62	
4	Estrela Portalegre	34	16	6	12	42	31	+11	54	
5	SC Lourinhanense	34	14	11	9	55	39	+16	53	
6	UD Oliveirense	34	14	11	9	46	36	+10	53	
7	SL Fanhões	34	14	10	10	48	44	+4	52	
8	AD Ovarense	34	14	9	11	33	32	+1	51	
9	Beneditense CD	34	14	9	11	43	39	+4	51	
10	O Elvas CAD	34	14	6	14	53	42	+11	48	
11	AC Cucujães	34	13	8	13	43	54	−11	47	
12	CD Torres Novas	34	12	8	14	42	42	0	44	
13	Caldas SC	34	11	11	12	52	59	−7	44	
14	AD Guarda	34	11	8	15	37	43	−6	41	
15	CD Alcains	34	10	7	17	40	40	0	37	Relegation to Terceira Divisão
16	GD Mangualde	34	8	7	19	31	64	−33	31	Relegation to Terceira Divisão
17	União Coimbra	34	6	6	22	25	70	−45	24	Relegation to Terceira Divisão
18	Benfica Castelo Branco	34	4	4	26	23	76	−53	16	Relegation to Terceira Divisão

=== Segunda Divisão – Zona Sul ===
Pos	Team	Pld	W	D	L	GF	GA	GD	Pts	Promotion or relegation
1	CD Santa Clara	34	18	11	5	60	31	+29	65	Promotion to Liga de Honra
2	Oriental Lisboa	34	19	6	9	49	34	+15	63	
3	União Montemor	34	17	8	9	47	25	+22	59	
4	Seixal FC	34	17	8	9	52	36	+16	59	
5	FC Barreirense	34	15	9	10	36	27	+9	54	
6	CD Beja	34	15	9	10	59	44	+15	54	
7	CSD Câmara de Lobos	34	15	8	11	53	45	+8	53	
8	Portimonense SC	34	16	5	13	47	35	+12	53	
9	Imortal DC	34	14	9	11	46	37	+9	51	
10	Juventude Évora	34	13	9	12	52	48	+4	48	
11	Atlético CP	34	13	7	14	41	41	0	46	
12	AD Camacha	34	11	11	12	33	36	−3	44	
13	SC Olhanense	34	10	14	10	47	42	+5	44	
14	AD Machico	34	9	11	14	36	43	−7	38	
15	SC Lusitânia	34	9	4	21	34	65	−31	31	Relegation to Terceira Divisão
16	GD Sesimbra	34	9	4	21	41	76	−35	31	Relegation to Terceira Divisão
17	Casa Pia AC	34	6	11	17	29	54	−25	29	Relegation to Terceira Divisão
18	Estrela Vendas Novas	34	4	8	22	35	78	−43	20	Relegation to Terceira Divisão
