= Mauro Pereira =

Portuguese footballer

Personal information
- Full name: Mauro André Soares Pereira
- Date of birth: 6 November 1991 (age 35)
- Place of birth: Coimbra, Portugal
- Height: 1.86 m (6 ft 1 in)
- Position: Centre-back

Team information
- Current team: Oliveira do Bairro

Youth career
- 2008–2010: Mealhada

Senior career*
Years	Team	Apps	(Gls)
2010–2011	Mealhada		
2011–2012	Pampilhosa		
2012	Oliveira de Frades	5	(0)
2012–2013	Oliveira do Bairro	19	(0)
2013–2014	Pampilhosa	25	(0)
2014–2015	Sertanense	28	(2)
2015	Mafra	1	(0)
2016	Sertanense	18	(0)
2016–2017	Fátima	32	(0)
2018	Sertanense	14	(2)
2018–2019	Pampilhosa	25	(6)
2019	Condeixa	6	(0)
2020–	Oliveira do Bairro	2	(0)
- * Club domestic league appearances and goals as of 22:24, 2 March 2020 (UTC)

Mauro André Soares Pereira (born 6 November 1991) is a Portuguese footballer who plays as a centre-back for Fátima.

== Career ==
Pereira made his professional debut in the Segunda Liga for Mafra on 31 October 2015 in a game against Oriental.
