= 1996–97 Segunda Divisão B =

Segunda Divisão
- Season: 1996–97
- Champions: FC Maia
- Promoted: SCU Torreense; FC Maia; Nacional Funchal
- Relegated: 13 teams

The 1996–97 Segunda Divisão season was the 63rd season of the competition and the 50th season of recognised third-tier football in Portugal.

== Overview ==
The league was contested by 54 teams in 3 divisions with SCU Torreense, FC Maia and CD Nacional winning the respective divisional competitions and gaining promotion to the Liga de Honra. The overall championship was won by FC Maia.

== League standings ==
=== Segunda Divisão - Zona Norte ===
Pos	Team	Pld	W	D	L	GF	GA	GD	Pts	Promotion or relegation
1	FC Maia	34	22	7	5	59	29	+30	73	Promotion to Liga de Honra
2	Leixões SC	34	20	9	5	59	26	+33	69	
3	FC Famalicão	34	14	10	10	41	40	+1	52	
4	Infesta FC	34	15	6	13	60	52	+8	51	
5	AD Lousada	34	14	8	12	37	38	−1	50	
6	SC Vila Real	34	12	12	10	40	30	+10	48	
7	Lusitânia Lourosa	34	12	12	10	44	38	+6	48	
8	Gondomar SC	34	13	9	12	44	36	+8	48	
9	FC Marco	34	11	14	9	30	29	+1	47	
10	FC Vizela	34	11	12	11	35	37	−2	45	
11	Lixa FC	34	11	11	12	35	35	0	44	
12	SC Vianense	34	11	11	12	30	35	−5	44	
13	AD Esposende	34	11	9	14	43	52	−9	42	
14	AD Fafe	34	11	8	15	42	45	−3	41	Relegation to Terceira Divisão
15	SC Freamunde	34	10	10	14	32	38	−6	40	Relegation to Terceira Divisão
16	SC Lamego	34	8	12	14	27	45	−18	36	Relegation to Terceira Divisão
17	CD Arrifanense	34	9	8	17	44	59	−15	35	Relegation to Terceira Divisão
18	ADC Montalegre	34	3	8	23	18	56	−38	17	Relegation to Terceira Divisão

=== Segunda Divisão - Zona Centro ===
Pos	Team	Pld	W	D	L	GF	GA	GD	Pts	Promotion or relegation
1	SCU Torreense	34	19	7	8	55	31	+24	64	Promotion to Liga de Honra
2	Naval 1º Maio	34	16	11	7	58	32	+26	59	
3	UD Oliveirense	34	15	10	9	46	32	+14	55	
4	AD Sanjoanense	34	14	12	8	42	31	+11	54	
5	AC Cucujães	34	13	15	6	49	29	+20	54	
6	SL Fanhões	34	13	12	9	50	45	+5	51	
7	AD Ovarense	34	12	14	8	39	34	+5	50	
8	AD Guarda	34	13	10	11	51	46	+5	49	
9	Caldas SC	34	12	11	11	38	45	−7	47	
10	União Coimbra	34	12	7	15	40	43	−3	43	
11	CD Alcains	34	9	15	10	37	40	−3	42	
12	Beneditense CD	34	11	8	15	47	49	−2	41	
13	Benfica Castelo Branco	34	10	11	13	36	43	−7	41	
14	CD Torres Novas	34	10	11	13	38	38	0	41	
15	AC Alcanenense	34	8	12	14	35	51	−16	36	Relegation to Terceira Divisão
16	GD Sourense	34	8	9	17	41	62	−21	33	Relegation to Terceira Divisão
17	CD Tondela	34	7	11	16	23	50	−27	32	Relegation to Terceira Divisão
18	AC Malveira	34	6	10	18	32	56	−24	28	Relegation to Terceira Divisão

=== Segunda Divisão - Zona Sul ===
Pos	Team	Pld	W	D	L	GF	GA	GD	Pts	Promotion or relegation
1	CD Nacional	34	24	6	4	79	30	+49	78	Promotion to Liga de Honra
2	CD Santa Clara	34	19	6	9	67	36	+31	63	
3	Oriental Lisboa	34	15	8	11	41	35	+6	53	
4	Juventude Évora	34	15	8	11	52	47	+5	53	
5	União Montemor	34	14	11	9	40	31	+9	53	
6	AD Camacha	34	14	10	10	48	38	+10	52	
7	SC Olhanense	34	14	8	12	34	36	−2	50	
8	CSD Câmara de Lobos	34	13	8	13	39	41	−2	47	
9	Atlético CP	34	13	8	13	50	49	+1	47	
10	Imortal DC	34	12	10	12	44	45	−1	46	
11	FC Barreirense	34	10	16	8	39	33	+6	46	
12	Portimonense SC	34	13	7	14	44	41	+3	46	
13	AD Machico	34	12	8	14	40	43	−3	44	
14	Casa Pia AC	34	9	12	13	33	46	−13	39	
15	CD Montijo	34	9	10	15	35	53	−18	37	Relegation to Terceira Divisão
16	CD Olivais e Moscavide	34	9	9	16	29	45	−16	36	Relegation to Terceira Divisão
17	Louletano DC	34	7	7	20	32	62	−30	28	Relegation to Terceira Divisão
18	Odivelas FC	34	4	8	22	24	59	−35	20	Relegation to Terceira Divisão
