= 1994–95 Segunda Divisão B =

Segunda Divisão
- Season: 1994–95
- Champions: Moreirense FC
- Promoted: Académico Viseu; Moreirense FC; FC Alverca
- Relegated: 12 teams

The 1994–95 Segunda Divisão season was the 61st season of the competition and the 48th season of recognised third-tier football in Portugal.

== Overview ==
The league was contested by 54 teams in 3 divisions with Académico Viseu, Moreirense FC and FC Alverca winning the respective divisional competitions and gaining promotion to the Liga de Honra. The overall championship was won by Moreirense FC.

== League standings ==
=== Segunda Divisão - Zona Norte ===
Pos	Team	Pld	W	D	L	GF	GA	GD	Pts	Promotion or relegation
1	Moreirense FC	34	20	8	6	54	30	+24	48	Promotion to Liga de Honra
2	Infesta FC	34	18	6	10	75	54	+21	42	
3	Varzim SC	34	17	8	9	50	37	+13	42	
4	FC Marco	34	17	6	11	58	44	+14	40	
5	Lusitânia Lourosa	34	13	13	8	38	34	+4	39	
6	AD Limianos	34	14	10	10	45	42	+3	38	
7	Leixões SC	34	13	11	10	44	28	+16	37	
8	Lixa FC	34	11	14	9	42	38	+4	36	
9	SC Vianense	34	12	11	11	31	38	−7	35	
10	AD Esposende	34	10	14	10	36	37	−1	34	
11	FC Maia	34	13	6	15	35	38	−3	32	
12	SC Freamunde	34	11	10	13	41	45	−4	32	
13	Amarante FC	34	10	10	14	31	41	−10	30	
14	FC Vizela	34	9	12	13	41	50	−9	30	
15	Juventude Ronfe	34	10	9	15	41	53	−12	29	Relegation to Terceira Divisão
16	AD Fafe	34	8	9	17	27	39	−12	25	Relegation to Terceira Divisão
17	Dragões Sandinenses	34	5	13	16	34	48	−14	23	Relegation to Terceira Divisão
18	AD Lousada	34	4	12	18	23	50	−27	20	Relegation to Terceira Divisão

=== Segunda Divisão - Zona Centro ===
Pos	Team	Pld	W	D	L	GF	GA	GD	Pts	Promotion or relegation
1	Académico Viseu	34	22	9	3	68	15	+53	53	Promotion to Liga de Honra
2	Naval 1º Maio	34	23	6	5	70	31	+39	52	
3	Caldas SC	34	15	9	10	33	28	+5	39	
4	Beneditense CD	34	16	6	12	52	38	+14	38	
5	Benfica Castelo Branco	34	13	12	9	47	45	+2	38	
6	SC Lourinhanense	34	12	12	10	47	49	−2	36	
7	AD Sanjoanense	34	14	8	12	40	44	−4	36	
8	CD Torres Novas	34	13	9	12	45	39	+6	35	
9	UD Oliveirense	34	11	11	12	57	38	+19	33	
10	União Coimbra	34	11	11	12	34	42	−8	33	
11	GD Peniche	34	11	10	13	49	55	−6	32	
12	CD Alcains	34	11	9	14	56	55	+1	31	
13	CD Tondela	34	12	7	15	38	53	−15	31	
14	Oliveira do Hospital	34	14	3	17	41	48	−7	31	
15	AD Guarda	34	8	15	11	34	42	−8	31	Relegation to Terceira Divisão
16	AC Marinhense	34	10	9	15	38	53	−15	29	Relegation to Terceira Divisão
17	União Santarém	34	5	11	18	29	64	−35	21	Relegation to Terceira Divisão
18	RD Águeda	34	0	13	21	23	62	−39	13	Relegation to Terceira Divisão

=== Segunda Divisão - Zona Sul ===
Pos	Team	Pld	W	D	L	GF	GA	GD	Pts	Promotion or relegation
1	FC Alverca	34	19	10	5	64	23	+41	48	Promotion to Liga de Honra
2	Louletano DC	34	19	10	5	59	21	+38	48	
3	CD Montijo	34	14	13	7	42	37	+5	41	
4	SC Olhanense	34	15	10	9	52	36	+16	40	
5	FC Barreirense	34	12	14	8	49	39	+10	38	
6	Casa Pia AC	34	12	13	9	44	38	+6	37	
7	CD Olivais e Moscavide	34	14	9	11	47	40	+7	37	
8	Atlético CP	34	13	9	12	46	42	+4	35	
9	União Montemor	34	10	13	11	35	39	−4	33	
10	SL Fanhões	34	14	5	15	46	39	+7	33	
11	Oriental Lisboa	34	6	20	8	26	34	−8	32	
12	Odivelas FC	34	12	7	15	35	43	−8	31	
13	CDR Quarteirense	34	9	11	14	34	50	−16	29	
14	Praiense SC	34	7	15	12	37	55	−18	29	
15	Juventude Évora	34	6	16	12	38	47	−9	28	Relegation to Terceira Divisão
16	Lusitano Évora	34	7	12	15	42	61	−19	26	Relegation to Terceira Divisão
17	O Elvas CAD	34	8	8	18	35	52	−17	24	Relegation to Terceira Divisão
18	União Santiago	34	7	9	18	23	58	−35	23	Relegation to Terceira Divisão
