= André Nogueira =

Portuguese footballer (born 1987)

Personal information
- Full name: André Filipe Fernandes Nogueira
- Date of birth: 10 February 1987 (age 39)
- Place of birth: Anadia, Portugal
- Height: 1.73 m (5 ft 8 in)
- Position: Right back

Youth career
- 1997–2001: Anadia
- 2001–2006: Sporting CP

Senior career*
Years	Team	Apps	(Gls)
2006–2007	Sporting CP	0	(0)
2006–2007	→ Esmoriz (loan)	13	(0)
2007–2008	Esmoriz	5	(0)
2008–2009	Torreense	23	(0)
2009–2010	Atlético	26	(1)
2010–2013	Anadia	70	(10)
2013–2015	Beira-Mar	49	(1)
2015–2016	Anadia	21	(2)
2016–2017	Águeda	11	(0)
2017–2019	Beira-Mar	55	(3)
2020	São João de Ver	2	(0)
2020	Pampilhosa	1	(0)

International career
2002–2003	Portugal U16	4	(0)
2006	Portugal U19	6	(0)
- * Club domestic league appearances and goals as of 19:33, 29 March 2020 (UTC)

André Filipe Fernandes Nogueira (born 10 February 1987) is a Portuguese professional footballer who plays as a right back.

== Club career ==
Born in Anadia, Aveiro District, Nogueira played youth football with local Anadia F.C. and Sporting CP. He was loaned by the latter club to S.C. Esmoriz to kickstart his senior career in 2006 in the third division, and remained in that level seven consecutive seasons, also representing S.C.U. Torreense, Atlético Clube de Portugal and Anadia.

Nogueira reached the professionals in summer 2013 at the age of 26, signing with S.C. Beira-Mar. He made his debut in the Segunda Liga on 12 August of that year when he played the full 90 minutes in a 2–3 home loss against FC Porto B, and finished the campaign with 27 games to help his team to the 12th position.

On 21 June 2014, Nogueira extended his contract with the Aveiro side for another two years. He left after only one, however, and returned to the lower leagues and Anadia.

Nogueira competed in amateur football until his retirement, representing Beira-Mar, SC São João de Ver and F.C. Pampilhosa.
