= Sandinenses =

Sandinenses may refer to:

- S.C. Dragões Sandinenses, Portuguese football club
- G.D.R.C. Os Sandinenses, Portuguese football club
