= 2000–01 Segunda Divisão B =

Segunda Divisão
- Season: 2000–01
- Champions: Moreirense FC
- Promoted: UD Oliveirense; Moreirense FC; Portimonense SC
- Relegated: 12 teams

The 2000–01 Segunda Divisão season was the 67th season of the competition and the 54th season of recognised third-tier football in Portugal.

== Overview ==
The league was contested by 59 teams in 3 divisions with UD Oliveirense, Moreirense FC and Portimonense SC winning the respective divisional competitions and gaining promotion to the Liga de Honra. The overall championship was won by Moreirense FC.

== League standings ==
=== Segunda Divisão – Zona Norte ===
Pos	Team	Pld	W	D	L	GF	GA	GD	Pts	Promotion or relegation
1	Moreirense FC	38	23	8	7	62	31	+31	77	Promotion to Liga de Honra
2	FC Famalicão	38	22	7	9	59	35	+24	73	
3	FC Porto B	38	18	10	10	74	52	+22	64	
4	União Paredes	38	18	7	13	55	43	+12	61	
5	FC Vizela	38	16	12	10	71	47	+24	60	
6	Leixões SC	38	14	18	6	60	46	+14	60	
7	SC Braga B	38	14	12	12	45	48	−3	54	
8	SC São João de Ver	38	14	8	16	44	54	−10	50	
9	Canelas Gaia FC	38	13	11	14	45	46	−1	50	
10	Infesta FC	38	13	11	14	67	74	−7	50	
11	Ermesinde SC	38	12	13	13	40	45	−5	49	
12	AD Esposende	38	12	13	13	45	50	−5	49	
13	Dragões Sandinenses	38	11	13	14	47	49	−2	46	
14	Vilanovense FC	38	12	9	17	51	66	−15	45	
15	GD Bragança	38	13	5	20	48	64	−16	44	
16	Gondomar FC	38	11	10	17	50	48	+2	43	
17	Lusitânia Lourosa	38	11	10	17	39	45	−6	43	Relegation to Terceira Divisão
18	CD Trofense	38	10	11	17	35	53	−18	41	Relegation to Terceira Divisão
19	Pevidém SC	38	11	8	19	41	68	−27	41	Relegation to Terceira Divisão
20	AD Fafe	38	10	8	20	40	54	−14	38	Relegation to Terceira Divisão

=== Segunda Divisão – Zona Centro ===
Pos	Team	Pld	W	D	L	GF	GA	GD	Pts	Promotion or relegation
1	UD Oliveirense	36	27	4	5	81	27	+54	85	Promotion to Liga de Honra
2	SC Covilhã	36	23	9	4	68	23	+45	78	
3	AD Sanjoanense	35	20	6	9	65	43	+22	66	
4	Oliveira do Bairro	36	17	8	11	57	39	+18	59	
5	SC Pombal	36	17	7	12	52	43	+9	58	
6	CD Feirense	36	16	10	10	49	44	+5	58	
7	CD Fátima	36	16	7	13	63	54	+9	55	
8	Académico Viseu	35	15	9	11	48	33	+15	54	
9	SCU Torreense	36	15	8	13	40	46	−6	53	
10	CD Alcains	36	14	7	15	51	46	+5	49	
11	UD Vilafranquense	36	13	8	15	44	42	+2	47	
12	AC Marinhense	36	12	10	14	47	50	−3	46	
13	União Coimbra	36	12	8	16	40	53	−13	44	
14	Caldas SC	36	11	9	16	43	56	−13	42	
15	CD Arrifanense	36	11	9	16	37	56	−19	42	
16	CD Torres Novas	36	10	9	17	49	68	−19	39	
17	AC Cucujães	36	4	13	19	32	64	−32	25	Relegation to Terceira Divisão
18	RD Águeda	36	5	10	21	35	64	−29	25	Relegation to Terceira Divisão
19	SC Lourinhanense	36	4	7	25	32	82	−50	19	Relegation to Terceira Divisão

=== Segunda Divisão – Zona Sul ===
Pos	Team	Pld	W	D	L	GF	GA	GD	Pts	Promotion or relegation
1	Portimonense SC	38	25	3	10	70	43	+27	78	Promotion to Liga de Honra
2	União da Madeira	38	18	9	11	46	37	+9	63	
3	FC Barreirense	38	16	14	8	48	30	+18	62	
4	Seixal FC	38	15	14	9	50	38	+12	59	
5	AD Machico	38	16	11	11	37	30	+7	59	
6	Louletano DC	38	15	12	11	46	36	+10	57	
7	Atlético CP	38	14	13	11	51	51	0	55	
8	Operário Açores	38	15	10	13	38	46	−8	55	
9	Benfica B	38	14	11	13	58	57	+1	53	
10	Marítimo Funchal B	38	14	11	13	53	48	+5	53	
11	SC Olhanense	38	13	14	11	45	44	+1	53	
12	GD Estoril Praia	38	14	11	13	45	46	−1	53	
13	Casa Pia AC	38	15	7	16	42	35	+7	52	
14	Sporting CP B	38	13	13	12	61	42	+19	52	
15	CSD Câmara de Lobos	38	14	9	15	45	41	+4	51	
16	AD Camacha	38	14	9	15	43	47	−4	51	
17	União Micaelense	38	11	9	18	34	51	−17	42	Relegation to Terceira Divisão
18	Oriental Lisboa	38	5	17	16	31	49	−18	32	Relegation to Terceira Divisão
19	GD Sesimbra	38	9	4	25	36	73	−37	31	Relegation to Terceira Divisão
20	Lusitano Évora	38	5	9	24	31	66	−35	24	Relegation to Terceira Divisão
