= Vasco Braga =

Portuguese footballer

Personal information
- Full name: Vasco André Carvalho Braga
- Date of birth: 8 September 1993 (age 33)
- Place of birth: Barcelos, Portugal
- Height: 1.75 m (5 ft 9 in)
- Position: Attacking midfielder

Team information
- Current team: Oliveirense
- Number: 8

Youth career
- 2001–2005: Esposende
- 2005–2008: Porto
- 2008–2009: Padroense
- 2009–2010: Gil Vicente
- 2010–2012: Varzim

Senior career*
Years	Team	Apps	(Gls)
2012–2014	Varzim	24	(1)
2013–2014	Varzim B	16	(3)
2014–2015	Vianense	40	(7)
2015–2016	Vilaverdense	18	(2)
2016–2017	Merelinense	24	(10)
2017–2023	Penafiel	109	(6)
2023–2024	Varzim	29	(4)
2024–2026	Fafe	52	(2)
2026–	Oliveirense	5	(0)
- * Club domestic league appearances and goals as of 12 September 2026

Vasco André Carvalho Braga (born 8 September 1993) is a Portuguese professional footballer who plays as an attacking midfielder for Liga 3 club Oliveirense.

== Club career ==
On 27 August 2017, Braga made his professional debut for Penafiel in a 2017–18 LigaPro match against Varzim.
