= Edu (footballer, born 1976) =

Brazilian footballer

Personal information
- Full name: Eduardo Godinho Felipe
- Date of birth: 5 January 1976 (age 50)
- Place of birth: São Paulo, Brazil
- Height: 1.85 m (6 ft 1 in)
- Position: Midfielder

Senior career*
Years	Team	Apps	(Gls)
1998	Criciúma		
1999–2000	Tampere United	20	(4)
2000–2002	Penafiel	27	(0)
2002–2003	Lusitânia	21	(1)
2003–2004	Lousada	18	(3)
2004–2005	Paredes	29	(1)
2005	Ovarense	1	(0)
2006	Aves	8	(0)
2006–2009	Trofense	47	(2)
2009–2010	Boavista	21	(0)
2010–2012	Aliados Lordelo	24	(0)
Total		216	(11)
- * Club domestic league appearances and goals

Eduardo Godinho Felipe (born 5 January 1976 in São Paulo), commonly known as Edu, is a Brazilian retired footballer who played as a defensive midfielder.
