= F.C. Infesta =

Portuguese football club

Infesta
- Full name: Futebol Clube Infesta
- Founded: 1934; 91 years ago
- Ground: Parque de Jogos Manuel Ramos; São Mamede de Infesta, Matosinhos; Portugal
- Capacity: 500
- Chairman: Manuel Ramos
- League: Terceira Divisão Série B
Home colours

Futebol Clube Infesta (abbreviated as FC Infesta) is a Portuguese football club based in São Mamede de Infesta, Matosinhos in the district of Porto.

== Background ==
FC Infesta currently plays in the Terceira Divisão Série B which is the fourth tier of Portuguese football. The club was founded in 1934 and they play their home matches at the Parque de Jogos Manuel Ramos in São Mamede de Infesta, Matosinhos. The stadium is able to accommodate 500 spectators.

The club is affiliated to Associação de Futebol do Porto and has competed in the AF Porto Taça. The club has also entered the national cup competition known as Taça de Portugal on many occasions.

== Appearances ==
- II Divisão B: 20
- III Divisão: 14
- Portuguese Cup: 34 (greatest result: 8th, 1996–97)

== Season to season ==
| Season | Level | Division | Section | Place | Movements |
|---|---|---|---|---|---|
| 1983–84 | Tier 5 | Distritais | AF Porto – Honra | 1st | Promoted |
| 1984–85 | Tier 4 | Terceira Divisão | | | Promoted |
| 1988–89 | Tier 4 | Terceira Divisão | | 1st | Promoted |
| 1989–90 | Tier 3 | Segunda Divisão | Série Norte | 10th | |
| 1990–91 | Tier 3 | Segunda Divisão | Série Norte | 4th | |
| 1991–92 | Tier 3 | Segunda Divisão | Série Norte | 4th | |
| 1992–93 | Tier 3 | Segunda Divisão | Série Norte | 9th | |
| 1993–94 | Tier 3 | Segunda Divisão | Série Norte | 10th | |
| 1994–95 | Tier 3 | Segunda Divisão | Série Norte | 2nd | |
| 1995–96 | Tier 3 | Segunda Divisão | Série Norte | 2nd | |
| 1996–97 | Tier 3 | Segunda Divisão | Série Norte | 4th | |
| 1997–98 | Tier 3 | Segunda Divisão | Série Norte | 4th | |
| 1998–99 | Tier 3 | Segunda Divisão | Série Norte | 7th | |
| 1999–2000 | Tier 3 | Segunda Divisão | Série Norte | 5th | |
| 2000–01 | Tier 3 | Segunda Divisão | Série Norte | 9th | |
| 2001–02 | Tier 3 | Segunda Divisão | Série Norte | 5th | |
| 2002–03 | Tier 3 | Segunda Divisão | Série Norte | 14th | |
| 2003–04 | Tier 3 | Segunda Divisão | Série Norte | 8th | |
| 2004–05 | Tier 3 | Segunda Divisão | Série Norte | 3rd | |
| 2005–06 | Tier 3 | Segunda Divisão | Série B | 5th | |
| 2006–07 | Tier 3 | Segunda Divisão | Serie B | 6th | |
| 2007–08 | Tier 3 | Segunda Divisão | Série B – 1ª Fase | 7th | |
| | Tier 3 | Segunda Divisão | Série B – Sub-Série B1 | 1st | |
| 2008–09 | Tier 3 | Segunda Divisão | Série B – 1ª Fase | 11th | Relegation Group |
| | Tier 3 | Segunda Divisão | Série B Últimos | 4th | Relegated |
| 2009–10 | Tier 4 | Terceira Divisão | Série B – 1ª Fase | 10th | Relegation Group |
| | Tier 4 | Terceira Divisão | Série B Últimos | 5th | Relegated |
| 2010–11 | Tier 5 | Distritais | AF Porto – Honra | 1st | Promoted |
| 2011–12 | Tier 4 | Terceira Divisão | Série B – 1ª Fase | 2nd | Promotion Group |
| | Tier 4 | Terceira Divisão | Série B Fase Final | 2nd | Promoted |

== Honours ==
- AF Porto 1ª Divisão: 2010/11
- AF Porto 1ª Divisão: 1983/84
- AF Porto 2ª Divisão: 1939/40
