= Sport Benfica e Castelo Branco =

Portuguese association football club

Benfica e Castelo Branco
- Full name: Sport Benfica e Castelo Branco
- Nicknames: Águia Albicastrense (Castelo Branco Eagles); Albicastrenses
- Founded: 24 March 1924; 102 years ago
- Ground: Estádio Municipal Vale do Romeiro, Castelo Branco
- Capacity: 2,500
- Chairman: Jorge Neves
- Manager: Dani Matos
- League: Campeonato de Portugal
- 2022–23: Serie C, 5th
- Website: www.sbcb.pt

Sport Benfica e Castelo Branco, commonly referred to as Benfica e Castelo Branco, is a semi-professional football club based in Castelo Branco, and it is an affiliated club of Benfica.

Founded on 24 March 1924, the club has traditionally worn a red and white home kit since inception. The team has played its home matches in the 2,500-capacity Estádio Municipal Vale do Romeiro in the outskirts of Castelo Branco since 1956.

== Current squad ==
As of 17 February 2024

Note: Flags indicate national team as defined under FIFA eligibility rules; some limited exceptions apply. Players may hold more than one non-FIFA nationality.

No.	Pos.	Nation	Player
1	GK	POR	David Romana
5	DF	GBS	Julimho
6	MF	BRA	Davi Lima
7	FW	POR	Miguel Cardoso
8	MF	POR	Ronaldo Coelho
9	FW	POR	Pedro Almeida
10	FW	URU	Eliane Nalerio
11	FW	POR	João Oliveira
12	GK	POR	Pedro Queichinho
13	DF	POR	Rodrigo Dias
15	FW	POR	Afonso Gaspar
16	MF	POR	Diogo Cornélio
17	FW	POR	Balelo

No.	Pos.	Nation	Player
18	MF	GBS	Lote
20	DF	POR	Rodrigo Barradas
21	MF	POR	Danny
22	MF	POR	Diogo Preto
23	MF	POR	João Silva
27	FW	POR	João Cristóvão
29	MF	POR	Tomás Oliveira
30	MF	BRA	Pietro Romano
51	MF	POR	Frazão
70	FW	POR	Flávio Barbosa
89	MF	POR	Gonçalo Correia
99	FW	ANG	Breno Mendonça

== Honours ==
- Terceira Divisão
  - Winners (4): 1959–60, 2000–01, 2003–04, 2011–12
- AF Castelo Branco First Division
  - Winners (8): 1953–54, 1955–56, 1958–59, 1959–60, 1968–69, 1973–74, 1975–76, 1979-80
- AF Castelo Branco Taça de Honra
  - Winners (1): 1979–80
- Taça Doutor Julio Goulão
  - Winners (1): 1979–80

== League and cup history ==
Season	Div.	Pos.	Pl.	W	D	L	GS	GA	P	Cup	Notes
1994–95	2DS	5	34	13	12	9	47	45	38	Round 4	
1995–96	2DS	13	34	9	13	12	37	46	40	Round 2	
1996–97	2DS	13	34	10	11	13	36	43	41	Round 2	
1997–98	2DS	18	34	4	4	26	23	76	16	Round 3	Relegated
1998–99	3DS	5	34	17	5	12	64	56	56	Round 2	
1999–00	3DS	4	34	17	11	6	33	43	62	Round 4	
2000–01	3DS	1	34	22	8	4	74	31	74	Round 1	Promoted
2001–02	2DS	13	38	12	9	17	60	65	45	Round 2	
2002–03	2DS	18	36	7	11	18	40	61	32	Round 3	Relegated
2003–04	3DS	1	34	21	11	2	61	18	74	Round 2	Promoted
2004–05	2DS	9	36	13	11	12	50	43	50	Round 3	
2005–06	2DS	12	26	5	9	12	26	42	24	Round 3	Relegated
2006–07	3DS	2	30	15	12	3	46	25	57	Round 1	Promoted
2007–08	2DS	11	26	6	6	12	23	35	30	Round 2	
2008–09	3DS	3	26	10	13	3	30	20	43	Round 1	
2009–10	3DS	7	22	7	9	6	29	28	30	Round 2	
2010–11	3DS	2	22	8	6	8	34	33	30	Round 1	
2011–12	3DS	2	20	10	5	5	38	17	35	Round 2	Promoted
2012–13	2DS	5	30	12	10	8	44	33	46	Round 2	

Last updated: 1 July 2013
2DS = Segunda Divisão; 3DS = Terceira Divisão
Pos. = Position; Pl = Match played; W = Win; D = Draw; L = Lost; GS = Goal scored; GA = Goal against; P = Points
