= Abrantes F.C. =

Portuguese football club

Abrantes
- Full name: Abrantes Futebol Clube
- Founded: 14 December 1998
- Ground: Estádio Municipal de Abrantes, Abrantes
- Capacity: 6,000
- Chairman: Alberto Lopes
- Manager: Ricardo Moura
- League: Portuguese Second Division
- 2005–06: Portuguese Second Division Série D, 5th
Home colours	Away colours

Abrantes Futebol Clube (Portuguese pronunciation: [ɐˈβɾɐ̃tɨʃ]) is a Portuguese football club from Abrantes. The team plays in the Second Division – Serie D.

The club was created on 14 December 1998 and was later dissolved.

== Appearances ==
- II Divisão B: 4
- III Divisão: 1

== League and cup history ==
Season	I	II	III	IV	V	VI	Pts.	Pl.	W	L	T	GS	GA	Diff.	Portuguese Cup
1999–2000						1									
2000–01					3?										
2001–02					3?										
2002–03					1										
2003–04				2 (D)			73 pts	34	22	7	5	83	32	50	
2004–05			8 (S)												
2005–06			5 (S/D)												
2006–07			7 (S/D)												
2007–08			7 (S/D)												

== Honours ==
- Campeão Distrital de Santarém da 2ª Divisão: 1
- Campeão Distrital de Santarém da 1ª Divisão: 1
- Winner of Taça do Ribatejo
- Winner of Supertaça Dr. Alves Vieira'

== Older uniforms ==
Home	Away

== Sponsors and manufacturer ==
Sponsors include Ajibira, the Municipality of Abrantes and Eurosol, its manufacturer was SOK.
