= C.D. Alcains =

Portuguese sports club

- Full name: Clube Desportivo Alcains
- Founded: 27 July 1977; 49 years ago
- Ground: Estádio Trigueiros do Aragão, Alcains
- Capacity: 1,750
- League: Campeonato de Portugal
- 2021–22: Portuguese District Championships (promoted)

Clube Desportivo Alcains is a Portuguese sports club from Alcains.

The men's football team plays in the Campeonato de Portugal. The club played on the third tier of Portuguese football in the 2020–21 Campeonato de Portugal, but were relegated. The club also enjoyed stints on the third tier while it was named Segunda Divisão B; from 1994 to 1998, 2000 to 2002 and 2003 to 2005.
