= Dionattan =

Brazilian footballer

Personal information
- Full name: Dionattan Elias Gehlen
- Date of birth: May 25, 1982 (age 44)
- Place of birth: São Miguel do Iguaçu, Brazil
- Position: Center midfielder

Team information
- Current team: Fluminense
- Academica
2006	Fluminense		

Dionattan Elias Gehlen or simply known as Dionattan is a Brazilian footballer who currently plays as a Center-Mid for Brazilian outfit Fluminense.

Dionattan was born in São Miguel do Iguaçu, Brazil, on May 25, 1982. He was one of Academica's best players and is known for his pin-point passes. In May 2006 he was in talks with Bolton Wanderers FC and Celtic FC but instead he criticized the fact that Bolton were pushovers and that he thought the SPL (Scottish League) was a step down from Portugal. He ended up returning to his native Brazil to play for Fluminense, upon receiving an offer from Fluminense's financial backer and president of a life insurance company named Unimed, Celso Barros.
