= U.D. Oliveirense =

Portuguese association football club

Oliveirense
- Full name: União Desportiva Oliveirense
- Nickname: Unionistas (Unionists)
- Founded: 25 October 1922; 103 years ago
- Ground: Estádio Carlos Osório, Oliveira de Azeméis
- Capacity: 1,750
- Owner: Onodera Group
- President: Nobuyuki Yamagata
- Head coach: Pedro Ribeiro
- League: Liga 3
- 2025–26: Liga Portugal 2, 18th of 18 (relegated)
- Website: www.udoliveirense.pt
Home colours	Away colours

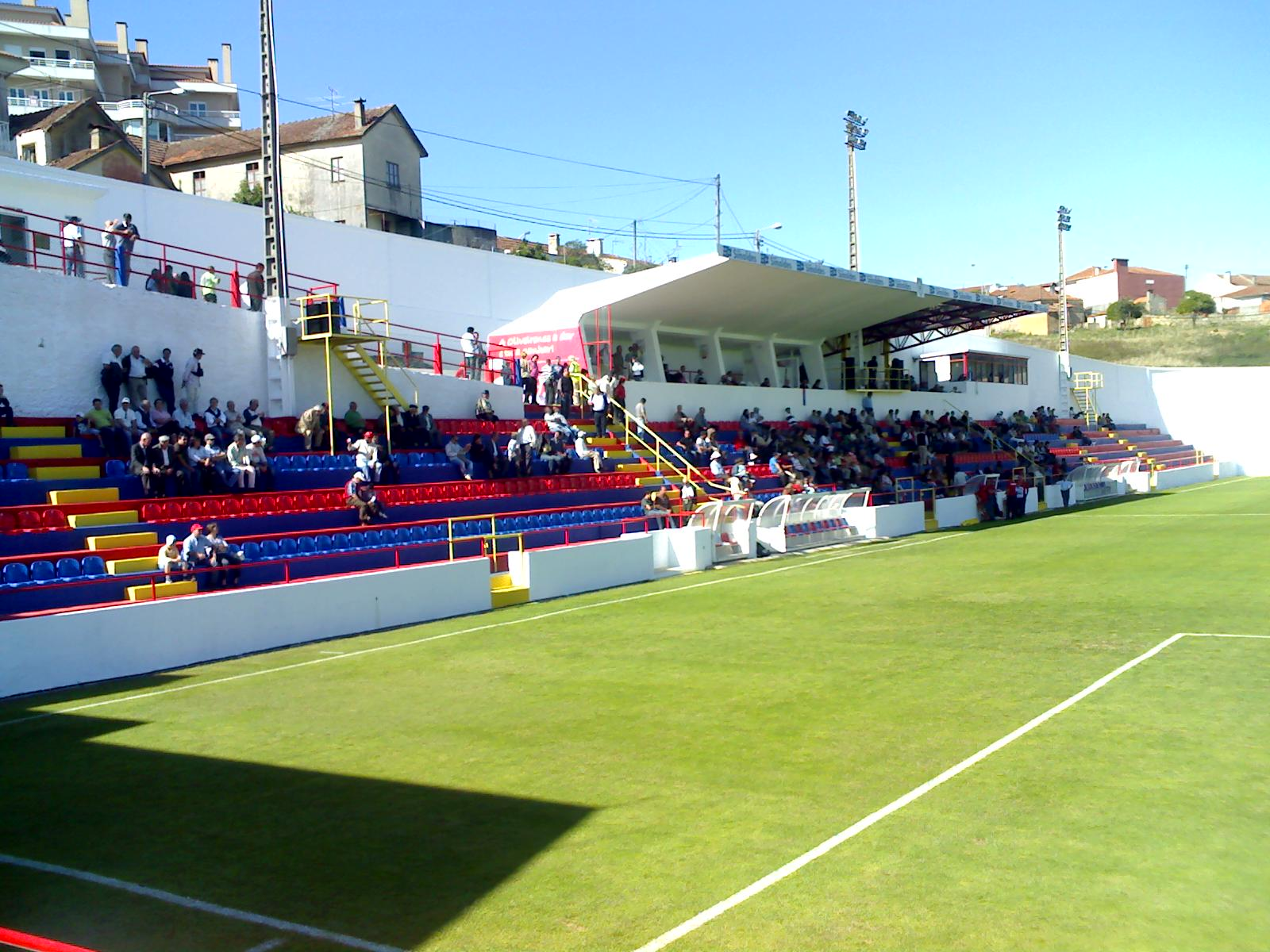
Estádio Carlos Osório

União Desportiva Oliveirense (UDO), commonly known as Oliveirense, is a Portuguese sports club from the city of Oliveira de Azeméis, in Aveiro District. The club was founded on 25 October 1922. The main football team currently plays at the Estádio Carlos Osório which holds a seating capacity of 1,750 and plays in Liga Portugal 2. As a multisports club it fields very successful teams in rink hockey and basketball as well. Its rink hockey team has won the Taça de Portugal on three occasions whilst its basketball team has won the Portuguese Basketball SuperCup and the Portuguese Basketball Cup. The Kelly–Simoldes–UDO cycling team, which holds a UCI Continental team licence, is affiliated with União Desportiva Oliveirense.

Oliveirense is part of the Aveiro Football Association which is the football association in charge of the district's football matters. In its entire history the club has won seven major trophies, of which their first was the AF Aveiro Championship in the 1945–46 season. Oliveirense are currently sponsored by Italian sportswear manufacturer Macron.

The club is owned by Japanese restaurant operator Onodera Group, which is also the owner of Yokohama FC.

== History ==
The club was founded on 25 October 1922 as União Desportiva Oliveirense. Prior to its inception it was called Sport Clube Oliveirense who had begun playing in the district league of Aveiro.

Following its establishment, shortly after Oliveirense was one of the founding clubs of the Aveiro Football Association along with Anadia, Beira-Mar, Bustelo, Clube dos Galitos, Espinho, Fogueirese, Ovarense, Paços Brandão, Sanjoanense, SC Oliveirense and Sociedade Recreio Artístico. The association was founded on the 22 September 1924.

This association would go on to establish the AF Aveiro Championship which Oliveirense would go on to win once in the 1945–46 season. During the 1945–46 season, the club also played in the Primeira Liga where after one season they were relegated. This is their only presence in the Primeira Liga. Following the club's relegation they would go on to play in the AF Aveiro First Division which the club won in the 1951–52, 1956–57 and 1957–58 seasons.

Over the next couple of decades the club would play in the district leagues, Terceira Divisão and Segunda Divisão. From 1989–90 to 2000–01 they played in the second division before gaining promotion to the Segunda Liga before being relegated once again to the second division in which they would six seasons before being promoted to the Segunda Liga in the 2007–08 season. Ever since the 2008–09 they have played in the Segunda Liga and achieved the club's best ever cup run in their history in the 2011–12 season where they reached the semi-final stage before being knocked out by eventually winners Académica de Coimbra.

On 4 November 2022, the Japanese football club Yokohama FC announced that the Onodera Group, a Japanese restaurant operator and owner of the club, had acquired a majority stake in UD Oliveirense which was playing in Liga Portugal 2. Along with Yokohama FC, UD Oliveirense became a subsidiary of the group. Onodera Group became the first company in history to manage J.League clubs and European clubs.

== Players ==
=== Current squad ===
As of 22 September 2026

Note: Flags indicate national team as defined under FIFA eligibility rules; some limited exceptions apply. Players may hold more than one non-FIFA nationality.

No.	Pos.	Nation	Player
1	GK	GBS	Rui Dabó
3	DF	POR	Guilherme Silva
4	DF	BRA	João Félix
6	MF	POR	João Daniel
7	FW	COL	Yefrei Rodríguez
8	MF	POR	Vasco Braga
9	FW	POR	Rodrigo Marquês (on loan from Torreense)
10	FW	BRA	João Tavares
11	MF	JPN	Sota Matsunaga
13	MF	POR	Vasco Santos
14	DF	POR	Simão Martins
16	MF	POR	Rodrigo Pinho
17	MF	JPN	Kotaro Nagata

No.	Pos.	Nation	Player
22	FW	POR	Ricardo Rei (on loan from Torreense)
23	DF	POR	João Sérgio
24	DF	POR	Gonçalo Loureiro
27	FW	POR	Miguel Monteiro
31	GK	POR	Ricardo Ribeiro
33	GK	ESP	Unai Pérez
55	DF	POR	Luís Bastos
70	FW	POR	Kiko Félix
78	MF	POR	Diogo Sancho
80	MF	JPN	Kazuya Onohara
95	FW	POR	Théo Fonseca
99	GK	POR	Sérgio Dutra

== Honours ==
- Segunda Divisão (Third-tier): 2
  - 2000–01, 2007–08
- Terceira Divisão (Third-tier): 1
  - 1957–58

- AF Aveiro Championship: 1
  - 1945–46
- AF Aveiro First Division: 3
  - 1951–52, 1956–57, 1957–58

== Managerial history ==
- (Cape Verde) Rui Maia (1963–1964)
- (Portugal) Edmundo Duarte (1989–1990)
- (Portugal) Vieira Nunes (July 1991 – April 1992)
- (Portugal) António Jesus (April 1992 – June 1992)
- (Portugal) Nicolau Vaqueiro (October 1992 – November 1992)
- (Portugal) Manuel Barbosa (December 1992 – April 1993)
- (Portugal) Tião (April 1993 – June 2000)
- (Portugal) Flávio das Neves (July 2000 – March 2003)
- (Portugal) Carlos Miragaia (March 2003 – November 2003)
- (Portugal) Adelino Teixeira (November 2003 – October 2004)
- (Portugal) Pedro Miguel (November 2004 – June 2012)
- (Portugal) João de Deus (1 July 2012 – 30 June 2013)
- (Portugal) Henrique Nunes (1 July 2013 – 2 December 2013)
- (Portugal) Artur Marques (2 December 2013 – 29 September 2015)
- (Portugal) Bruno Sousa (30 September 2015 – 18 January 2016)
- (Portugal) João Bastos (19 January 2016 – 22 March 2016)
- (Portugal) Bruno Sousa (23 March 2016 – 30 June 2016)
- (Portugal) Pedro Miguel (19 July 2016 – 10 November 2020)
- (Portugal) Raúl Oliveira (11 November 2020 – 30 June 2021)
- (Portugal) Fábio Pereira (3 July 2021 – 7 December 2023)
- (Portugal) Ricardo Chéu (11 December 2023 – Present)

== League and cup history ==
Season	Div.	Pos.	Pl.	W	D	L	GS	GA	P	Cup	League Cup	Notes
1945–46	1D	12	22	3	2	17	22	73	8	Round 1		Relegated
1989–90	2DS	15	34	11	6	17	37	45	28	Round 3		
1990–91	2DS	6	38	19	7	12	52	32	45	Round 4		
1991–92	2DS	9	34	12	11	11	48	46	35	Round 4		
1992–93	2DS	5	34	14	12	8	60	43	40	Round 4		
1993–94	2DS	9	34	13	10	11	43	43	36	Round 2		
1994–95	2DS	9	34	11	11	12	57	38	33	Round 3		
1995–96	2DS	3	34	19	9	6	49	21	66	Round 4		
1996–97	2DS	3	34	15	10	9	46	32	55	Round 2		
1997–98	2DS	6	34	14	11	9	46	36	53	Round 3		
1998–99	2DS	9	34	12	12	10	48	41	48	Round 3		
1999–00	2DS	8	38	18	3	17	54	48	57	Round 2		
2000–01	2DS	1	36	27	4	5	81	27	85	Round 5		Promoted
2001–02	2H	18	34	6	10	18	31	49	28	Round 4		Relegated
2002–03	2DS	4	36	17	10	9	55	40	61	Round 2		
2003–04	2DS	7	38	14	13	11	57	44	55	Round 3		
2004–05	2DS	13	36	12	12	12	59	45	48	Round 4		
2005–06	2DS	1	26	17	5	4	52	26	56	Round 6		^{[A]}
2006–07	2DS	2	26	12	10	4	37	23	46	Round 4		
2007–08	2DS	1	34	24	8	2	65	22	80	Round 5		Promoted
2008–09	2H	14	30	7	11	12	25	33	32	Round 2	Round 1	
2009–10	2H	5	30	14	7	9	38	27	49	Round 4	Round 1	
2010–11	2H	4	30	12	9	9	36	35	45	Round 2	Round 2	
2011–12	2H	7	30	10	9	11	39	38	39	Semi Final	First Group Stage	
2012–13	2L	8	42	16	12	14	52	49	60	Round 5	First Group Stage	
2013–14	2L	18	42	13	8	21	56	76	47	Round 3	Round 1	
2014–15	2L	17	46	14	13	19	50	67	55	Round 4	Round 1	
2017–18	2L	12	38	13	10	15	45	47	49	Round 2		

A. ^A Reached the playoffs.

Last updated: 14 July 2012
Div. = Division; 1D = Portuguese League; 2H = Liga de Honra; 2DS = Portuguese Second Division

Pos. = Position; Pl = Match played; W = Win; D = Draw; L = Lost; GS = Goal scored; GA = Goal against; P = Points

== See also ==
- U.D. Oliveirense (basketball)
- U.D. Oliveirense (roller hockey)
