= Ali El-Omari =

Moroccan footballer (born 1978)

Ali El Omari
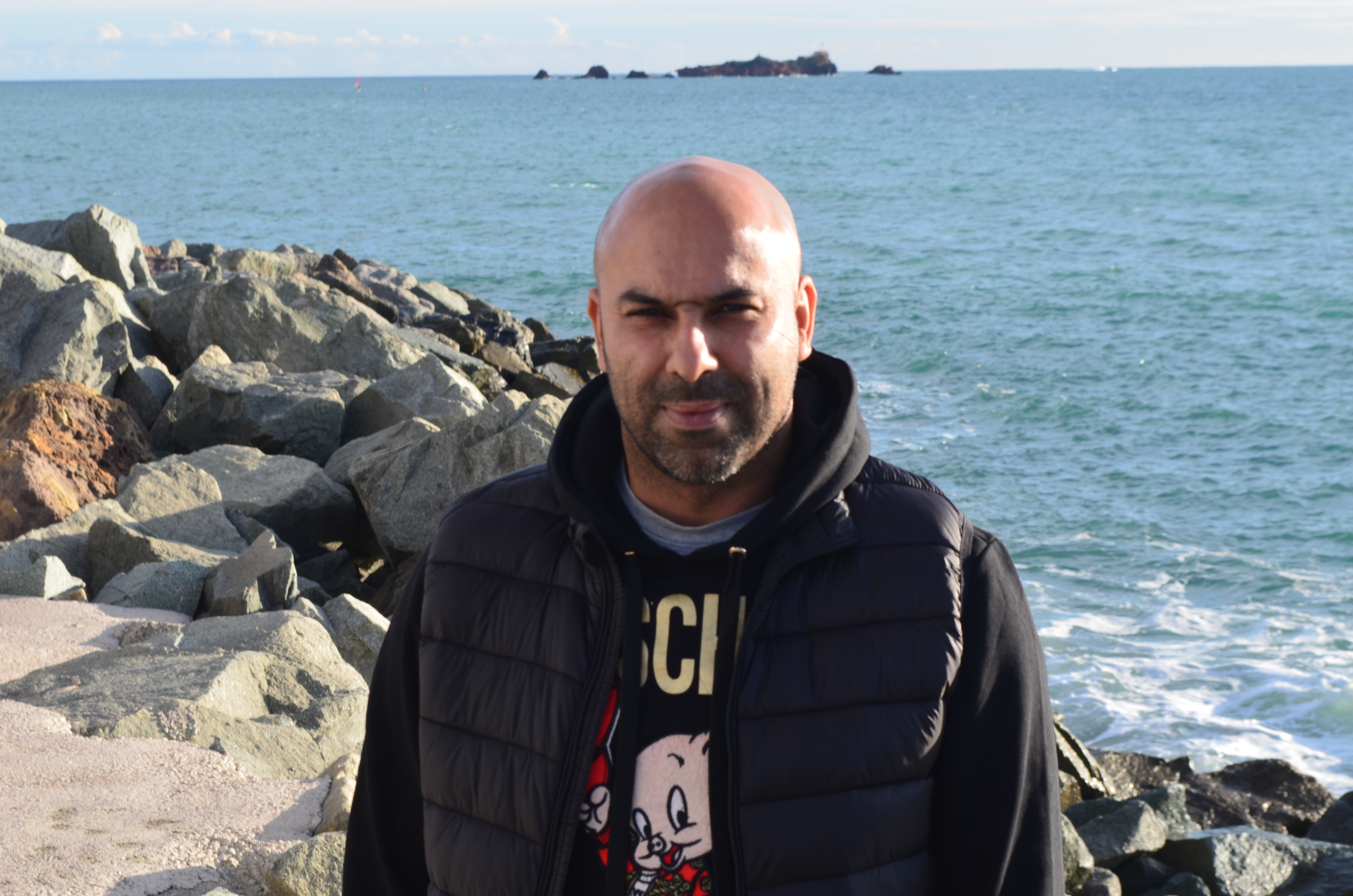

Personal information
- Full name: Ali El Omari
- Date of birth: 27 June 1978 (age 48)
- Place of birth: Châteaudun, France
- Height: 1.78 m (5 ft 10 in)
- Positions: Midfielder; left winger

Senior career*
Years	Team	Apps	(Gls)
1998–1999	US Joué-lès-Tours	20	(5)
1999–2000	FC Bourg-Péronnas	29	(5)
2000–2001	Sporting Espinho	29	(4)
2001–2003	Gil Vicente	45	(2)
2003–2004	Boavista	23	(0)
2004–2005	Estoril	2	(0)
2005	Beira Mar	14	(0)
2005–2006	Apollon Kalamarias	6	(1)
2006	C.S. Marítimo	5	(0)
2006–2008	Créteil	38	(2)
2008–2009	Nea Salamina	12	(1)
2009–2010	AEK Larnaca	17	(1)

International career
2003–2004	Morocco	3	(0)
- * Club domestic league appearances and goals as of July 2009

Ali El Omari (Arabic: علي العمري; born 27 June 1978) is a former footballer. Born in France, he represented Morocco at international level.

== Club career ==
El Omari previously played for US Créteil-Lusitanos in the French Ligue 2.
