= A.A. Avanca =

Portuguese football club

AA Avanca
- Full name: Associação Atlética de Avanca
- Founded: 1937
- Ground: Parque Desportivo da Associação Atlética de Avanca, Estarreja
- Capacity: 1,500
- Manager: (Portugal) Fernando Pereira
- League: Portuguese Second Division Serie B
- 2007/08: Portuguese Second Division Serie B, 13th

Associação Atlética de Avanca known as A.A. Avanca is a Portuguese football club from Estarreja, Aveiro. They currently play in the Portuguese Second Division Serie B and in the 2007–08 season they finished 13th place in their division. They currently play their home games in Parque Desportivo da Associação Atlética de Avanca and their home ground has a capacity of 1,500. Their current manager is Fernando Pereira and they do not have a chairman because they have different owners of the club. Their main sponsor are Joviflex and Durit.

== Season to season ==
Season	Level	Division	Section	Place	Movements
2002–03	Tier 4	Terceira Divisão		15th	Relegated
2003–04	Tier 5	Distritais	AF Aveiro – Honra	1st	Promoted
2004–05	Tier 4	Terceira Divisão		6th	
2005–06	Tier 4	Terceira Divisão		2nd	
2006–07	Tier 3	Segunda Divisão		8th	
2007–08	Tier 3	Segunda Divisão		13th	

== Squad ==
As of the 2008/09 season

Note: Flags indicate national team as defined under FIFA eligibility rules; some limited exceptions apply. Players may hold more than one non-FIFA nationality.

No.	Pos.	Nation	Player
—	GK	POR	Pedro
—	GK	POR	Godofredo
—	DF	POR	Cajó
—	DF	POR	Mané
—	DF	POR	Ricardo Miguel
—	DF	POR	Pedro Pesquina
—	DF	POR	Norberto
—	DF	POR	Bruno Bastos
—	DF	POR	Lino
—	DF	POR	Américo
—	MF	BRA	Miguito

No.	Pos.	Nation	Player
—	MF	POR	Hugo Santos
—	MF	POR	Domingos
—	MF	POR	Nélson
—	MF	POR	Márcio
—	MF	POR	João Paulo
—	MF	POR	Hélder Mendes
—	MF	POR	Filipito
—	FW	POR	Bruninho
—	FW	POR	Miguel Ângelo
—	FW	POR	Cerqueira
—	FW	POR	Gonzaga

== Staff ==
=== Sports ===
- Head Coach:
- (Portugal) Fernando Pereira
- Assistant Coach:
- (Portugal) Coelho
- Goalkeeper Coach:
- (Portugal) Zequinha
- Medical Assistant:
- (Portugal) João Calisto
