= Alonso (footballer) =

Brazilian footballer (born 1980)

Personal information
- Full name: Alonso Ferreira de Matos
- Date of birth: 11 August 1980 (age 46)
- Place of birth: Montes Claros, Brazil
- Height: 1.75 m (5 ft 9 in)
- Position: Left back

Team information
- Current team: Villa Nova-MG

Senior career*
Years	Team	Apps	(Gls)
1998–2000	Cruzeiro	10	(0)
2001	Criciúma		
2002	Fluminense	10	(0)
2003	Criciúma	19	(0)
2004	Paysandu	34	(3)
2004–2009	Nacional Madeira	108	(9)
2009–2012	Marítimo	17	(3)
2013	Tupi	8	(2)
2013–	Villa Nova-MG	5	(0)
- * Club domestic league appearances and goals as of 21 February 2014, 11:02 UTC

Alonso Ferreira de Matos (born 11 August 1980 in Montes Claros), simply known as Alonso is a Brazilian footballer who plays as a left back for Villa Nova Atlético Clube.

He signed with Marítimo for the Portuguese outfit from rivals C.D. Nacional in 2009 and marked his debut with a goal from the penalty-spot in a 1–1 against Benfica.

Alonso previously played for Cruzeiro, Fluminense, Criciúma and Paysandu in the Campeonato Brasileiro. He moved to Portugal in July 2004, where he spent five seasons with C.D. Nacional.
