= C.D. Mafra =

Association football club in Portugal

Mafra
- Full name: Clube Desportivo de Mafra
- Founded: 24 May 1965; 61 years ago
- Ground: Estádio Municipal de Mafra, Mafra
- Capacity: 1,249
- Chairman: José Cristo
- Manager: Tim Sparv
- League: Liga 3
- 2025–26: Liga 3, First stage Série B, 2nd of 10; Promotion stage, 4th of 8
- Website: cdmafrasad.pt
Home colours	Away colours

Clube Desportivo de Mafra is a Portuguese association football club, currently playing in the Liga 3, the third tier of the Portuguese football league system. They are based in the town of Mafra and own Campo Doutor Mário Silveira stadium, but the games are played in Estádio Municipal de Mafra. Founded in 1965, the club predominantly played within Portugal's regional leagues where they gradually worked their way up until they won the Lisbon Football Association Division 1 title in the 1991–92 league season and promotion to the national leagues.

== History ==
Clube Desportivo Mafra was founded on 24 May 1965. Initially, in 1940, the club was established under its original colors but was re-founded in 1965. The club began its football activities in 1967. In the 1970–71 season, the club won the third division title of the Lisbon Football Association. Five seasons later, they were crowned champions of the second division of the same association.

In the 1991–92 season, the club secured the first division title of the Lisbon Football Association, allowing them to join the national championships for the first time in the 1992–93 season. During its first two seasons in the Terceira Divisão (the fourth tier), the club finished tenth before topping its group in the 1994–95 season. However, the club spent only one season in the Segunda Divisão B before being relegated back to the Tercera Divisão. The following season, they were relegated again to the first division of the Lisbon Football Association.

In the 1997–98 season, Mafra finished second and returned to the Tercera Divisão, where they remained for four seasons. In the 2001–02 season, Mafra topped its group, earning promotion back to the Segunda Divisão B. The club stayed at this level for 14 seasons before winning the northern promotion group to the Segunda Liga in the 2014–15 season. This was achieved by defeating Famalicão, the winner of the other promotion group, with a 1–1 draw followed by a 4–3 victory in the ensuing penalty shootout.

In the 2021/22 Season they make it into the semifinals of the Taça de Portugal until they got knocked out by Tondela 4-1 on Aggregate.

Dream 99 on 15 August 2023, it was announced that HEARTLAND, holding company for the Danish clothing chain Bestseller, purchased Benham's shares and became majority owner of the club, as well as a Danish Side FC Midtjylland

== Appearances ==
=== Since 2000 ===
- LigaPro: 8 (as of the 2024–25 season)
- Segunda Divisão/Campeonato Nacional: 15
- Terceira Divisão: 2

== Seasons ==
=== Recent seasons ===
Season	Div.	Pos.	Pld	W	D	L	GF	GA	Pts	Taça de Portugal	Notes
2000–01	4D	3rd	34	20	7	7	77	38	67	Third Round	
2001–02	4D	1st	34	24	7	3	71	22	79	Second Round	Promoted
2002–03	3D	2nd	38	18	11	9	55	41	65	Third Round	
2003–04	3D	8th	38	14	9	15	51	51	51	Third Round	
2004–05	3D	2nd	36	17	14	5	47	28	65	Second Round	
2005–06	3D	7th	30	13	8	9	45	38	47	Second Round	
2006–07	3D	5th	26	10	9	7	33	22	39	Fifth Round	
2007–08	3D	5th	26	12	5	9	35	23	41	Second Round	6th in promotion group
2008–09	3D	7th	22	8	6	8	20	20	30	Second Round	2nd in relegation group
2009–10	3D	5th	30	12	10	8	29	26	46	Round of 16	
2010–11	3D	2nd	30	15	10	5	60	37	55	Third Round	
2011–12	3D	6th	30	10	16	4	33	22	46	Second Round	
2012–13	3D	2nd	30	19	7	4	57	28	64	First Round	
2013–14	3D	1st	18	12	6	0	37	14	42	Third Round	6th in promotion group
2014–15	3D	1st	18	11	3	4	28	12	36	Second Round	Champions
2015–16	2D	21st	46	12	18	16	37	40	54	Second Round	Relegated
2016–17	3D	3rd	18	12	3	3	35	9	39	First Round	1st in relegation group
2017–18	3D	1st	30	21	6	3	61	21	69	Second Round	Champions
2018–19	2D	14th	34	10	11	13	40	44	41	Second Round	
2019–20	2D	4th	24	10	9	5	33	24	39	Round of 16	
2020–21	2D	12th	34	9	10	15	35	48	37	Second Round	
2021–22	2D	9th	34	11	10	13	37	42	43	Semifinals	
2022–23	2D	6th	34	12	11	11	46	49	47	Fourth Round	
2023–24	2D	9th	34	11	11	12	37	39	44	Fourth Round	
2024–25	2D	18th	34	6	9	19	29	54	27	Third Round	Relegated
2025–26	3D	4th	30	14	8	8	41	37	50	Second Round	

(Note: All third & fourth division playoffs not counted here)

== Players ==
=== Current squad ===
As of 22 September 2026

Note: Flags indicate national team as defined under FIFA eligibility rules; some limited exceptions apply. Players may hold more than one non-FIFA nationality.

No.	Pos.	Nation	Player
1	GK	POR	Francisco Lemos
2	DF	MLI	Moussa Camara
3	DF	BRA	Kauê
5	DF	POR	Gonçalo Cardoso
6	MF	MLI	Yacouba Maïga
7	FW	POR	Rodri Matos
8	MF	POR	Lénio Neves
9	FW	ESP	Mamor Niang
10	FW	BRA	Lucas Gabriel
11	FW	BRA	Leandro Alves
13	DF	POR	Celso Raposo
15	DF	POR	João Silva
17	FW	GBS	Alassana Baldé
18	FW	CIV	Goba Zakpa

No.	Pos.	Nation	Player
20	FW	CIV	Deme Jr
21	FW	GBS	Ença Fati
22	DF	POR	Francisco Ferreira
29	DF	BRA	Raphael Rossi
33	GK	POR	Pedro Silva
37	MF	SEN	Amadou Ba
39	MF	BRA	Andrey
42	FW	SEN	Adama Ngom
46	MF	GBS	Braima Sambú
66	DF	POR	João Ferreira
76	DF	POR	Lukas
90	FW	POR	Rafael Moreira
99	GK	POR	Rodrigo Estevão
—	DF	MLI	Cheick Diakité (on loan from Midtjylland)

=== On loan ===
Note: Flags indicate national team as defined under FIFA eligibility rules; some limited exceptions apply. Players may hold more than one non-FIFA nationality.

No.	Pos.	Nation	Player
—	GK	BRA	Guilherme Christino (at Alcochetense until 30 June 2027)
—	DF	GBS	Mamadu Queta (at Sertanense until 30 June 2027)
—	DF	DEN	Pontus Texel (at Académica until 30 June 2027)
—	MF	POR	Ussumane Djaló (at Vitória de Setúbal until 30 June 2027)

No.	Pos.	Nation	Player
—	MF	POR	Tiago Trindade (at Sertanense until 30 June 2027)
—	FW	ANG	Valter Monteiro (at Wiliete until 30 June 2027)
—	FW	POR	Precatado (at Alcochetense until 30 June 2027)
—	FW	POR	Gui Silva (at Sporting da Covilhã until 30 June 2027)

== Notable players ==
- (Angola) Loide Augusto
- (Angola) Mário Balbúrdia
- (Angola) Inácio Miguel
- (Cape Verde) Tiago Almeida
- (Cape Verde) Cuca
- (China) Han Pengfei
- (China) Li Shuai (youth)
- (China) Tan Yang
- (China) Yu Dabao
- (China) Zhang Chengdong
- (Republic of the Congo) Bryan Passi
- (Ivory Coast) Ousmane Diomande
- (Cyprus) Renato Margaça
- (Guinea-Bissau) Leonel Alves
- (Guinea-Bissau) Zidane Banjaqui
- (Guinea-Bissau) Abel Camará
- (Guinea-Bissau) Mutaro Embaló
- (Guinea-Bissau) Malá
- (Guinea-Bissau) Marculino Ninte
- (Guinea-Bissau) Madi Queta
- (Guinea-Bissau) Flávio Silva
- (Guinea-Bissau) Juary Soares
- (Guinea-Bissau) Emiliano Té
- (Honduras) Bryan Róchez
- (Iceland) Elías Ólafsson
- (Macau) Ricardo Torrão
- (Portugal) Filipe Ramos
- (São Tomé and Príncipe) Harramiz
- (Saudi Arabia) Saleh Al-Shehri
- (Saudi Arabia) Omar Al-Sohaymi
- (Senegal) Mory Diaw
- (Sierra Leone) Alhaji Kamara
- (Sint Maarten) Ilounga Pata

== Honours ==
- Campeonato de Portugal: 2014–15, 2017–18
- Terceira Divisão: 2001–02
- Associação de Futebol de Lisboa Division 1: 1991–92
- Associação de Futebol de Lisboa Division 2: 1975–76
- Associação de Futebol de Lisboa Division 3: 1970–71

== Managers ==
- (Portugal) Filipe Ramos (1 July 2005 – 23 February 2009)
