= G.D. Ribeirão =

Portuguese football club

Ribeirão
- Full name: Grupo Desportivo de Ribeirão
- Nickname: os ribeirenses
- Founded: 1968
- Ground: Passal, Famalicão, Portugal
- Capacity: 3,000
- Chairman: (Portugal) Adriano Pereira
- Manager: (Portugal) José Carlos Lemos
- League: Portuguese Second Division
- 2009–10: Portuguese Second Division, 6th
Home colours	Away colours

Grupo Desportivo de Ribeirão, known as Ribeirão, is a Portuguese football club based in Ribeirão, Vila Nova de Famalicão, Braga District. Founded in 1968, it currently plays in the Portuguese Third Division, holding home matches at Estádio do Passal, which has a capacity of 3,000.

== Appearances ==
- Segunda Divisão: 19
- Terceira Divisão: 19

== League history ==
Season	I	II	II B	III	AF-I	Pts.	Pl.	W	L	T	GS	GA	Diff.	Portuguese Cup
1995–96				9 (A)		47 pts	34	12	11	11	57	53	+4
1996–97				2 (B)		66 pts	34	20	6	8	55	33	+22
1997–98			7			48 pts	34	12	12	10	53	42	+9
1998–99			15			38 pts	34	10	8	16	35	44	−9
2003–04				1		70 pts	34	20	10	4	78	36	+42
2004–05			10			54 pts	38	17	3	18	49	51	−2
2005–06			4			41 pts	26	11	8	7	18	15	+3
2006–07			4			39 pts	26	11	6	9	34	29	+5
2007–08			7			29 pts	22	8	5	9	25	26	−1
2009–10			9

== Notable players ==
- (Portugal) António André
