= A.D. Lousada =

Portuguese sports club

Lousada
- Full name: Associação Desportiva de Lousada
- Founded: 1948
- Ground: Estádio Municipal de Lousada; Lousada, Portugal
- Capacity: 3,000
- League: Portuguese Second Division
Home colours	Away colours

Associação Desportiva de Lousada or simply AD Lousada is a Portuguese club, based in Lousada, district of Porto. The club has various sports, specially football, field hockey and basketball.

== Football ==
=== Appearances ===
- II Divisão: 16
- III Divisão: 10
- Taça de Portugal: 26
- Taça da Liga: 0

=== League Cup and History ===
As of April 14, 2009

Season	Division	Pos.	Pl/	W	D	L	GS	Pts	Portuguese Cup	Notes
1984–85	Distritais – 1ª Divisão	1st	??	??	??	??	??	??	Did not participated	Promoted
1985–86	III Div. – Série B	12th	30	9	9	12	25–34	27	3rd Preliminaries	
1986–87	III Div. – Série B	13th	30	8	12	10	29–35	28	3rd Round	
1987–88	III Div. – Série B	10th	38	13	13	12	42–37	39	1st Round	
1988–89	III Div. – Série B	11th	34	12	8	14	33–33	32	2nd Round	
1989–90	III Div. – Série B	1st	34	22	7	5	63–29	51	1st Round	Final – Promoted
1990–91	II Divisão B	??	??	??	??	??	??	??	6th Round	
1991–92	II Divisão B	??	??	??	??	??	??	??	4th Round	
1992–93	II Divisão B	??	??	??	??	??	??	??	3rd Round	
1993–94	II Divisão B	??	??	??	??	??	??	??	2nd Round	
1994–95	II Divisão B	??	??	??	??	??	??	??	3rd Round	Relegated
1995–96	III Divisão	1st	??	??	??	??	??	??	1st Round	Promoted
1996–97	II Divisão B	5th	34	14	8	12	37–38	50	2nd Round	
1997–98	II Divisão B	15th	??	??	??	??	??	??	3rd Round	Relegated
1998–99	III Div. – Série B	8th	??	??	??	??	??	??	3rd Round	
1999–2000	III Div. – Série B	3rd	??	??	??	??	??	??	3rd Round	
2000–01	III Div. – Série B	14th	??	??	??	??	??	??	2nd Round	
2001–02	III Div. – Série B	2nd	??	??	??	??	??	??	4th Round	Promoted
2002–3	II Div. – Zona Norte	2nd	38	21	9	8	73–41	72	3rd Round	
2003–04	II Div. – Zona Norte	13th	36	11	10	15	46–63	43	2nd Round	
2004–05	II Div. – Zona Norte	14th	38	14	9	15	62–53	51	4th Round	
2005–06	II Div. – Série B	1st	26	15	6	5	39–22	51	4th Round	Playoffs
2006–07	II Div. – Série A	11th	26	7	9	10	29–34	30	3rd Round	
2007–08	II Div. – Série A	6th	26	11	7	8	22–19	41	2nd Round	Qualified for Promotion Round
2007–08	II Div. – Série A Promotion Group	5th	10	2	4	4	7–13	31		
2008–09	II Div. – Série B	8th	22	5	10	7	23–29	25	3rd Round	Qualified for Relegation Round
2008–09	II Div. – Série B Promotion Group	3rd	10	4	1	5	11–10	26		
2009–10	II Div.	9th	28	10	5	13	26–37	35		
2010–11	II Div. – Zona Norte	9th	30	13	7	13	46–40	46		
2011–12	II Div. – Zona Norte	14th	30	8	8	14	30–45	32		Relegated to 3rd division
