= A.D. Esposende =

Portuguese football club

Esposende
- Full name: Associação Desportiva de Esposende
- Founded: 1978; 48 years ago
- Stadium: Estádio Padre Sá Pereira
- Capacity: 1,700
- President: José Manuel Ribeiro Sousa
- Head coach: Pedro Simões
- League: Terceira Divisão Série A
- Website: ade-esposende.com
Home colours

Associação Desportiva de Esposende (abbreviated as AD Esposende) is a Portuguese football club based in Esposende in the district of Braga.

== Background ==
AD Esposende currently plays in the Terceira Divisão Série A which is the fourth tier of Portuguese football. The club was founded in 1978 and they play their home matches at the Estádio Padre Sá Pereira in Esposende. The stadium is able to accommodate 1,700 spectators.

The club is affiliated to Associação de Futebol de Braga and has competed in the AF Braga Taça. The club has also entered the national cup competition known as Taça de Portugal on occasions, and reached the semifinals in 1999.

== Season to season ==
| Season | Level | Division | Section | Place | Movements |
|---|---|---|---|---|---|
| 1990–91 | Tier 3 | Segunda Divisão | Série Norte | 13th | |
| 1991–92 | Tier 3 | Segunda Divisão | Série Norte | 12th | |
| 1992–93 | Tier 3 | Segunda Divisão | Série Norte | 10th | |
| 1993–94 | Tier 3 | Segunda Divisão | Série Norte | 9th | |
| 1994–95 | Tier 3 | Segunda Divisão | Série Norte | 10th | |
| 1995–96 | Tier 3 | Segunda Divisão | Série Norte | 4th | |
| 1996–97 | Tier 3 | Segunda Divisão | Série Norte | 13th | |
| 1997–98 | Tier 3 | Segunda Divisão | Série Norte | 1st | Promoted |
| 1998–99 | Tier 2 | Liga de Honra | | 14th | |
| 1999–2000 | Tier 2 | Liga de Honra | | 17th | Relegated |
| 2000–01 | Tier 3 | Segunda Divisão | Série Norte | 12th | |
| 2001–02 | Tier 3 | Segunda Divisão | Série Norte | 15th | |
| 2002–03 | Tier 3 | Segunda Divisão | Série Norte | 19th | Relegated |
| 2003–04 | Tier 4 | Terceira Divisão | Série A | 9th | |
| 2004–05 | Tier 4 | Terceira Divisão | Série A | 5th | |
| 2005–06 | Tier 4 | Terceira Divisão | Série A | 13th | Relegated |
| 2006–07 | Tier 5 | Distritais | AF Braga – Honra | 5th | |
| 2007–08 | Tier 5 | Distritais | AF Braga – Honra | 8th | |
| 2008–09 | Tier 5 | Distritais | AF Braga – Honra | 6th | |
| 2009–10 | Tier 5 | Distritais | AF Braga – Honra | 2nd | Promoted |
| 2010–11 | Tier 4 | Terceira Divisão | Série A – 1ª Fase | 6th | Promotion Group |
| | Tier 4 | Terceira Divisão | Série A Fase Final | 4th | |
| 2011–12 | Tier 4 | Terceira Divisão | Série A – 1ª Fase | 7th | Relegation Group |
| | Tier 4 | Terceira Divisão | Série A Últimos | 2nd | |

== Honours ==
- AF Braga Taça: 1971/72
