= F.C. Lixa =

Portuguese football club

FC Lixa
- Full name: Futebol Clube da Lixa
- Founded: 1934
- Ground: Senhor do Amparo, Porto
- Capacity: 5,000
- Chairman: Manuel Carvalho
- Manager: Zeca Lopes
- League: Portuguese Second Division Serie A
- 2007/08: Portuguese Second Division Serie A, 14th
- Website: https://www.fclixa.com.sapo.pt/

Futebol Clube da Lixa known as FC Lixa is a Portuguese football club from Lixa which was founded in 1934. They currently play in the Portuguese Second Division Serie A and last season they finished 14th place 2007/08. They currently play their home games in Senhor do Amparo with a capacity of 5,000. Their current chairman is Manuel Carvalho and their manager is Zeca Lopes.

== Season to season ==
Season	Level	Division	Section	Place	Movements
2001–02	Tier 5	Distritais	AF Porto – 1º Escalão	1st	Promoted
2002–03	Tier 4	Terceira Divisão	Série A	1st	Promoted
2003–04	Tier 3	Terceira Divisão	Série Norte	11th	
2004–05	Tier 3	Terceira Divisão	Série Norte	8th	
2005–06	Tier 3	Segunda Divisão	Série Norte	10th	
2006–07	Tier 3	Segunda Divisão	Série Norte	8th	
2007–08	Tier 3	Segunda Divisão	Série A – 1ª Fase	14th	

== Current squad ==
Note: Flags indicate national team as defined under FIFA eligibility rules; some limited exceptions apply. Players may hold more than one non-FIFA nationality.

No.	Pos.	Nation	Player
1	GK	POR	Pimenta
2	GK	POR	Peixe
3	GK	POR	Helio
4	DF	POR	Paulo Diogo
5	DF	POR	Raul
6	MF	POR	Henrique Sergio
7	FW	POR	Miguel Angelo
8	DF	POR	Antero
9	FW	POR	Daniel
10	FW	POR	Nelo
11	FW	SEN	Tamsir Kané
12	GK	POR	Cristiano

No.	Pos.	Nation	Player
13	FW	POR	Paiva
14	FW	POR	Fabien
15	MF	POR	Samuel
17	MF	POR	Cenoura
18	DF	POR	Domingos
19	GK	POR	Rui Faria
20	MF	POR	Viduka
21	DF	POR	Cristiano
22	DF	POR	Toninho
23	DF	BRA	Wivisson
24	MF	POR	Filipe Mesquita
25	DF	POR	Eduardo

== Former players ==
- Wesley John - Saint Vincent and the Grenadines international who played in Portugal for 23 years, including for clubs Ribeira Brava and Porto da Cruz, both below the Portuguese fourth tier)
