= G.D.R.C. Os Sandinenses =

Portuguese sports club

- Full name: Grupo Desportivo Recreativo e Cultural Os Sandinenses
- Founded: 15 May 1986; 39 years ago
- Ground: Complexo Desportivo Dona Maria Teresa
- Capacity: 1,200
- League: Pró Nacional Série 2
- 2020–21: 9th

Grupo Desportivo Recreativo e Cultural Os Sandinenses is a Portuguese sports club from Sande, Guimarães.

The men's football team plays in the Pró Nacional Série 2 of the Braga Football Association. The team last played in the third tier of Portuguese football after winning its group in the 2004–05 Terceira Divisão, and then placing seventh in its group in the 2005–06 Segunda Divisão.
