= G.D. Tourizense =

Portuguese association football club

Tourizense
- Full name: Grupo Desportivo Tourizense
- Founded: 1975; 51 years ago
- Ground: Visconde do Vinhal, Touriz, Portugal
- Capacity: 1,200
- Chairman: (Portugal) Jorge Marques
- Manager: (Portugal) João Bastos
Home colours	Away colours

Grupo Desportivo Tourizense is a Portuguese football club based in Touriz, Tábua Municipality. Founded in 1975, it plays home games at Estádio Visconde do Vinhal, with a 1,200-seat capacity.

== History ==
Founded in 1975, Tourizense steadily progressed from the regional leagues in Coimbra to the third division.

Its highest point was playing against Benfica in the 2005–06 Portuguese Cup (11 January 2006), in a 2–0 home loss.

== League cup and history ==
Season	I	II	III	IV	V	Pts.	Pl.	W	L	T	GS	GA	Diff.	Portuguese Cup
1995–96				13		39 pts	34	10	9	15	47	53	−6	
2008–09		2				33 pts	30	14	8	8	44	30	14	1st round
2009–10		3				40 pts	30	14	8	8	35	25	10	2nd round

== Honours ==
- AF Coimbra – 1st Division:
  - Champions (1): 2002–03
