= S.C. Dragões Sandinenses =

Portuguese sports club

- Full name: Sport Clube Os Dragões Sandinenses
- Founded: 15 November 1927
- Ground: Tourão, Sandim
- League: Honra Série A AF Porto
- 2020–21: 14th

Sport Clube Os Dragões Sandinenses is a Portuguese sports club from Sandim, Vila Nova de Gaia.

The men's football team plays in the Honra Série A of the Porto Football Association. The team played in the third tier of Portuguese football until being relegated from the 2006–07 Segunda Divisão, and then experiencing a crushing relegation from the 2007–08 Terceira Divisão, losing every single game.

== Former players ==
- Wesley John - Saint Vincent and the Grenadines international who played in Portugal for 23 years, including for clubs Ribeira Brava and Porto da Cruz, both below the Portuguese fourth tier)
