= Oliveira do Bairro S.C. =

Portuguese football club

Oliveira do Bairro
- Full name: Oliveira do Bairro Sport Clube
- Nickname: Falcões do Certima (Certima falcons)
- Founded: 1922; 104 years ago
- Ground: Estádio Municipal, Oliveira do Bairro, Portugal
- Capacity: 1,500
- Chairman: (Portugal) Carlos Ferreira
- Manager: (Portugal) Maná
- League: SABSEG AF Aveiro
- 2018–19: SABSEG AF Aveiro, 8th
Home colours	Away colours

Oliveira do Bairro Sport Clube is a Portuguese football club based in Oliveira do Bairro, Aveiro District. Founded in 1922, it currently competes in the fourth tier Terceira Divisão. The home ground is at the 1.500 seat capacity Oliveira do Bairro Municipal Stadium.

== Appearances ==
- Tier 3: 17
- Tier 4: 17

== Season to season ==
Season	Level	Division	Section	Place	Movements
2009–10	Tier 3	Segunda Divisão		14th	Relegated
2010–11	Tier 4	Terceira Divisão	Série D – 1ª Fase		
	Tier 4	Terceira Divisão	Série D Fase Final		
