= S.C. Esmoriz =

Portuguese football club

Esmoriz
- Full name: Sporting Clube de Esmoriz
- Nickname(s): SCE
- Founded: 1932
- Ground: Estádio da Barrinha; Esmoriz, Portugal
- Capacity: 2.500
- Chairman: Aderito Ferreira
- Manager: Narcismo Ratinho
- League: Aveiro FA 1 Division

Sporting Clube de Esmoriz (Portuguese pronunciation: [ɨʒmuˈɾiʃ]) is a small football club in the Portuguese city of Esmoriz. They currently play in the First Regional Division in Aveiro. Their club colours are red and white.
