= C.D. Olivais e Moscavide =

Portuguese football club

Desportivo Olivais e Moscavide
- Full name: Clube Desportivo dos Olivais e Moscavide
- Founded: 1912; 114 years ago
- Ground: Estádio Alfredo Marques Augusto, Lisbon
- Capacity: 2.730
- Chairman: Gonçalo Candeias
| Home colours | Away colours |

Clube Desportivo dos Olivais e Moscavide is a centenary club located in the eastern area of Lisbon that distinguishes itself in practice in different levels of football, basketball, American Football and Table Football, in addition to developing various recreational and sociocultural activities.

== History ==
Founded on September 1, 1912, in the Parish of Santa Maria dos Olivais where the Oriente Station is currently located (currently the Parish of Parque das Nações), it had as its first name Rua Nova Foot-ball Club where it participated in 1931/32 in the District Championship of Promotion of the Lisbon Football Association, having achieved that same year promotion to the 2nd District Division.

In 1935 it adopts the name Clube Desportivo dos Olivais.

In 1943/44 he won the defunct AFL Cup of Honor.

In 1972/73 he became Champion of the 2nd Division of the AFL.

In 1976/77 it reached the National Championships for the first time when it ascended to the 3rd National Division, definitively changing its name to Clube Desportivo dos Olivais e Moscavide.

In the year he won the AFL Cup of Honor in 1982/83, he was recognized as an Institution of Public Utility by the Portuguese Government, winning again the AFL Cup of Honor in 1984/85 and 1986/87.

In 1988/89, he obtained the best classification ever in his history, finishing in 9th place in the National Championship of the 2nd Division.

In 1991/92 wins the South Zone of the National Championship of the 3rd Division.

On 08/31/1993, the Portuguese State awarded the SPORTS MERITO MEDAL, the most important decoration held by the club.

In 1994/95 the participation in the Portuguese Cup is marked by the elimination in the quarter-finals by Sporting CP (which would win the competition) in front of more than 5 thousand spectators, the biggest attendance until today verified in the Alfredo Marques Augusto Stadium.

In 2000/01 he won his first national title when he became National Champion of the 3rd National Division, a feat that would be surpassed when he reached the 2nd national title when in 2005/06 he became National Champion of the 2nd National Division.

In 2006/07 it integrates the Professional Championships in the then called Division of Honor.

In 2006, he received the Medal of Sporting Merit from the Municipality of Loures.

In 2013/14, in the second season of his return to the AFL district championships, he won the AFL 3rd Division Championship.

In the 2019/20 season, playing in the AFL 2nd Division Championship, wins the AFL Cup whose final was played in calendar year 2021.

In 2022, for the second year in a row, he won the AFL Cup.

It currently competes in the AFL Division 1 Championship.

== Honours ==
- Segunda Divisão
  - Champions (1): 2005–06
- Terceira Divisão
  - Champions (1): 2000–01
