= F.C. Pampilhosa =

Portuguese association football club

- Full name: Futebol Clube da Pampilhosa
- Founded: 1930
- Ground: Estádio Germano Godinho, Pampilhosa
- Capacity: 2,000
- Chairman: Joaquim Tomé
- Manager: João Pedro Duarte
- League: SABSEG AF Aveiro
- 2018–19: SABSEG AF Aveiro, 4th
Home colours	Away colours

Futebol Clube da Pampilhosa is a Portuguese football club in Pampilhosa, Mealhada, district of Aveiro.
