= 1989–90 Terceira Divisão =

Terceira Divisão
- Season: 1989–90
- Champions: C.D. Montijo; 3rd title

The 1989–90 Terceira Divisão season was the 43rd season of the competition and the 43rd season of recognised third-tier football in Portugal. It was the final year the Terceira Divisão served as the country’s third tier, as it was moved to the fourth tier following the establishment of the Segunda Divisão de Honra for the 1990–91 season.

== Overview ==
The league was contested by 108 teams distributed across 6 groups of 18 teams each. A.D. Esposende, A.D. Lousada, Anadia F.C., U.F.C.I. Tomar, C.D. Santa Clara, and C.D. Montijo won their respective groups and advanced to the Championship play-off. C.D. Montijo was the overall champion after defeating A.D. Lousada 1–0 in the Championship final.

== League standings ==
=== Terceira Divisão – Group 1 ===
Pos	Team	Pld	W	D	L	GF	GA	GD	Pts	Promotion or relegation
1	A.D. Esposende	34	16	15	3	51	27	+24	47	Advance to Championship play-off
2	Moreirense F.C.	34	16	12	6	54	30	+24	44	Promotion to Segunda Divisão B
3	SC Mirandela	34	15	11	8	57	32	+25	41	Promotion to Segunda Divisão B
4	C.R.P. Delães	34	17	6	11	54	52	+2	40	Promotion to Segunda Divisão B
5	A.D. Valpaços	34	15	8	11	40	31	+9	38	Promotion to Segunda Divisão B
6	C.D. Amadores de Caminha	34	14	9	11	40	29	+11	37	Advance to Segunda Divisão B play-off
7	Santa Maria F.C.	34	15	7	12	43	44	−1	37	
8	C.A. Macedo de Cavaleiros	34	14	9	11	40	41	−1	37	
9	A.D. Ponte da Barca	34	13	8	13	37	38	−1	34	
10	C.D. Celoricense	34	12	9	13	43	39	+4	33	
11	Vieira S.C.	34	11	10	13	37	38	−1	32	
12	SC Maria da Fonte	34	8	16	10	26	31	−5	32	
13	C.A. Valdevez	34	8	16	10	34	29	+5	32	
14	F.C. Amares	34	9	14	11	28	33	−5	32	
15	U.D. Lanheses	34	9	9	16	34	46	−12	27	Qualification for Relegation play-off
16	G.D. Prado	34	9	8	17	22	38	−16	26	Qualification for Relegation play-off
17	S.C. Vila Pouca Aguiar	34	10	5	19	41	55	−14	25	Qualification for Relegation play-off
18	G.D. Ribeirão	34	4	10	20	19	67	−48	18	Qualification for Relegation play-off

=== Terceira Divisão – Group 2 ===
Pos	Team	Pld	W	D	L	GF	GA	GD	Pts	Promotion or relegation
1	A.D. Lousada	34	22	7	5	63	29	+34	51	Advance to Championship play-off
2	S.C. Vila Real	34	19	8	7	58	33	+25	46	Promotion to Segunda Divisão B
3	U.S.C. Paredes	34	16	10	8	55	34	+21	42	Promotion to Segunda Divisão B
4	A.D. Sanjoanense	34	17	7	10	54	38	+16	41	Promotion to Segunda Divisão B
5	Amarante F.C.	34	14	13	7	46	34	+12	41	Promotion to Segunda Divisão B
6	Leça F.C.	34	15	9	10	53	35	+18	39	Advance to Segunda Divisão B play-off
7	Ermesinde S.C.	34	16	6	12	45	30	+15	38	
8	U.D. Valonguense	34	13	11	10	42	37	+5	37	
9	Lusitânia F.C. Lourosa	34	13	10	11	40	35	+5	36	
10	Pedrouços A.C.	34	11	12	11	46	47	−1	34	
11	F.C. Lixa	34	13	7	14	38	36	+2	33	
12	S.C. Dragões Sandinenses	34	11	10	13	31	37	−6	32	
13	S.C. Régua	34	9	10	15	30	39	−9	28	
14	S.C. Rio Tinto	34	9	8	17	32	52	−20	26	
15	C.F. Valadares	34	5	15	14	28	52	−24	25	Qualification for Relegation play-off
16	C.D. Cinfães	34	7	8	19	27	70	−43	22	Qualification for Relegation play-off
17	A.D.C. Santa Marta Penaguião	34	7	7	20	32	54	−22	21	Qualification for Relegation play-off
18	S.C. Paivense	34	5	10	19	33	61	−28	20	Qualification for Relegation play-off

=== Terceira Divisão – Group 3 ===
Pos	Team	Pld	W	D	L	GF	GA	GD	Pts	Promotion or relegation
1	Anadia F.C.	34	22	5	7	57	26	+31	49	Advance to Championship play-off
2	A.D. Ovarense	34	18	10	6	60	21	+39	46	Promotion to Segunda Divisão B
3	G.D. Santacombadense	34	20	4	10	37	28	+9	44	Promotion to Segunda Divisão B
4	F.C. Oliveira do Hospital	34	14	13	7	41	27	+14	41	Promotion to Segunda Divisão B
5	C.D. Estarreja	34	17	6	11	61	33	+28	40	Promotion to Segunda Divisão B
6	C.F. União de Coimbra	34	17	6	11	56	31	+25	40	Advance to Segunda Divisão B play-off
7	A.R.C. Oliveirinha	34	14	10	10	42	35	+7	38	
8	G.D. Mealhada	34	15	8	11	41	35	+6	38	
9	C.D. Luso	34	13	11	10	41	28	+13	37	
10	C.D. Gouveia	34	12	12	10	41	43	−2	36	
11	A.D. Valonguense	34	13	10	11	34	29	+5	36	
12	S.C. Alba	34	11	10	13	35	33	+2	32	
13	G.D. Argus	34	11	10	13	39	40	−1	32	
14	G.D. Tabuense	34	11	7	16	31	42	−11	29	
15	U.D. Seia	34	10	7	17	47	42	+5	27	Qualification for Relegation play-off
16	Mortágua F.C.	34	8	9	17	27	42	−15	25	Qualification for Relegation play-off
17	S.C. Sabugal	34	4	5	25	31	107	−76	13	Qualification for Relegation play-off
18	A.D. Valecambrense	34	3	3	28	19	98	−79	9	Qualification for Relegation play-off

=== Terceira Divisão – Group 4 ===
Pos	Team	Pld	W	D	L	GF	GA	GD	Pts	Promotion or relegation
1	U.F.C.I. Tomar	34	22	10	2	49	14	+35	54	Advance to Championship play-off
2	Naval 1º Maio	34	20	9	5	60	23	+37	49	Promotion to Segunda Divisão B
3	CA Mirandense	34	20	7	7	51	15	+36	47	Promotion to Segunda Divisão B
4	União de Santarém	34	18	9	7	53	24	+29	45	Promotion to Segunda Divisão B
5	G.C. Alcobaça	34	13	14	7	33	27	+6	40	Promotion to Segunda Divisão B
6	C.D. Torres Novas	34	15	10	9	48	39	+9	40	Advance to Segunda Divisão B play-off
7	C.P. Fátima	34	14	11	9	54	28	+26	39	Advance to Segunda Divisão B play-off
8	A.C. Alcanenense	34	11	15	8	43	30	+13	37	
9	Sertanense F.C.	34	11	14	9	36	34	+2	36	
10	A.C. Marinhense	34	9	15	10	40	41	−1	33	
11	S.C. Estrela Portalegre	34	9	10	15	37	53	−16	28	
12	S.C.E. Bombarralense	34	4	19	11	21	34	−13	27	
13	G.D. Nazarenos	34	9	9	16	38	53	−15	27	
14	C.D. Alcains	34	7	11	16	41	49	−8	25	
15	S.C. Leiria e Marrazes	34	8	8	18	28	47	−19	24	Qualification for Relegation play-off
16	A.D. Castelo Vide	34	8	8	18	26	54	−28	24	Qualification for Relegation play-off
17	S.U. Alfeizerense	34	7	8	19	29	60	−31	22	Qualification for Relegation play-off
18	A.R.C.D. Ferrel	34	5	5	24	23	85	−62	15	Qualification for Relegation play-off

=== Terceira Divisão – Group 5 ===
Pos	Team	Pld	W	D	L	GF	GA	GD	Pts	Promotion or relegation
1	C.D. Santa Clara	34	18	9	7	54	41	+13	45	Advance to Championship play-off
2	União Almeirim	34	18	8	8	65	34	+31	44	Promotion to Segunda Divisão B
3	SG Sacavenense	34	15	12	7	41	21	+20	42	Promotion to Segunda Divisão B
4	S.C. Campomaiorense	34	17	7	10	54	23	+31	41	Promotion to Segunda Divisão B
5	Clube Oriental de Lisboa	34	14	12	8	41	28	+13	40	Promotion to Segunda Divisão B
6	GS Loures	34	12	14	8	44	38	+6	38	Advance to Segunda Divisão B play-off
7	C.D. Portosantense	34	13	11	10	48	31	+17	37	
8	U.D. Vilafranquense	34	11	13	10	29	26	+3	35	
9	SL Fanhões	34	12	10	12	33	37	−4	34	
10	C.F. Benfica	34	12	10	12	36	41	−5	34	
11	C.S.D. Câmara de Lobos	34	10	13	11	28	36	−8	33	
12	Odivelas F.C.	34	11	9	14	45	47	−2	31	
13	S.C. Lusitânia	34	11	9	14	29	34	−5	31	
14	S.C. Praiense	34	10	11	13	22	34	−12	31	
15	S.C. Borbense	34	8	11	15	30	49	−19	27	Qualification for Relegation play-off
16	A.C. Cacém	34	7	10	17	29	49	−20	24	Qualification for Relegation play-off
17	A.C. Fronteirense	34	6	11	17	23	50	−27	23	Qualification for Relegation play-off
18	S.L. Cartaxo	34	5	12	17	32	64	−32	22	Qualification for Relegation play-off

=== Terceira Divisão – Group 6 ===
Pos	Team	Pld	W	D	L	GF	GA	GD	Pts	Promotion or relegation
1	C.D. Montijo	34	19	10	5	60	26	+34	48	Advance to Championship play-off
2	C.D.R. Quarteirense	34	17	11	6	74	32	+42	45	Promotion to Segunda Divisão B
3	Amora F.C.	34	18	7	9	58	37	+21	43	Promotion to Segunda Divisão B
4	U.S.C. Santiago Cacém	34	16	10	8	60	36	+24	42	Promotion to Segunda Divisão B
5	C.F. Esperança de Lagos	34	16	9	9	56	36	+20	41	Promotion to Segunda Divisão B
6	S.R. Almancilense	34	16	8	10	38	28	+10	40	Advance to Segunda Divisão B play-off
7	Moura AC	34	13	13	8	49	41	+8	39	Advance to Segunda Divisão B play-off
8	Vasco Gama A.C. Sines	34	15	7	12	42	47	−5	37	
9	União Montemor	34	15	6	13	56	39	+17	36	
10	Leões F.C. Tavira	34	10	12	12	26	27	−1	32	
11	Imortal D.C.	34	9	13	12	46	50	−4	31	
12	Palmelense F.C.	34	10	11	13	50	52	−2	31	
13	C.D. Beja	34	11	9	14	38	54	−16	31	
14	G.D.P. Costa de Caparica	34	12	7	15	38	53	−15	31	
15	G.D. Quimigal	34	9	12	13	34	37	−3	30	Qualification for Relegation play-off
16	Estrela de Vendas Novas	34	6	10	18	29	53	−24	22	Qualification for Relegation play-off
17	C.F. Trafaria	34	4	12	18	33	80	−47	20	Qualification for Relegation play-off
18	G.D. Sesimbra	34	4	5	25	22	81	−59	13	Qualification for Relegation play-off

== Championship play-off ==
=== Championship play-off – Zone 1 ===
Pos	Team	Pld	W	D	L	GF	GA	GD	Pts	Promotion
1	A.D. Lousada	4	2	1	1	7	4	+3	5	Promotion to Segunda Divisão B
2	A.D. Esposende	4	2	1	1	7	5	+2	5	Promotion to Segunda Divisão B
3	Anadia F.C.	4	0	2	2	1	6	−5	2	Promotion to Segunda Divisão B

=== Championship play-off – Zone 2 ===
Pos	Team	Pld	W	D	L	GF	GA	GD	Pts	Promotion
1	C.D. Montijo	4	3	1	0	8	1	+7	7	Promotion to Segunda Divisão B
2	U.F.C.I. Tomar	4	1	1	2	4	5	−1	3	Promotion to Segunda Divisão B
3	C.D. Santa Clara	4	1	0	3	3	9	−6	2	Promotion to Segunda Divisão B

=== Championship final ===
1 July 1990

A.D. Lousada	0 – 1	C.D. Montijo

Estádio Municipal de Coimbra, Coimbra
Referee: Lourenço Ferreira

== Segunda Divisão B play-off ==
The Segunda Divisão B play-off was a single-match series featuring the four lowest-placed teams from each group of the second-tier Segunda Divisão (2D), the six 6th-placed teams from each of the six series of the third-tier Terceira Divisão, and the two best 7th-placed teams from across the six Terceira Divisão series. The 10 winners qualified to third-tier 1990–91 Segunda Divisão B, while the losing sides moved to fourth-tier 1990–91 Terceira Divisão.

Home	Score	Away
G.D. Peniche (2D)	0–2	Leça F.C.
GD Samora Correia (2D)	1–2	S.U. Sintrense (2D)
C.D. Torres Novas	1–2	CD Lousanense (2D)
Moura AC	0–2	F.C. Marco (2D)
C.D. Portalegrense (2D)	0–1	C.D. Trofense (2D)
GS Loures	2–0	S.R. Almancilense
C.D. Amadores de Caminha	0–5	U.D. Oliveirense (2D)
F.C. Vizela (2D)	2–0	C.P. Fátima
C.F. União de Coimbra	1–1 (3–1 p)	SC Vianense (2D)
Oliveira do Bairro S.C. (2D)	1–2 (a.e.t.)	C.D. Olivais e Moscavide (2D)

== Relegation play-off ==
The Relegation play-off was a two-round series, each with a single-match, featuring the four lowest-placed teams from each group of the third-tier Terceira Divisão, and 12 teams from the fourth-tier District Championships (D). The 9 winners from Second round qualified to fourth-tier 1990–91 Terceira Divisão, while the losing sides from both rounds were relegated to the fifth-tier 1990–91 District Championships.

=== First round ===
Home	Score	Away
S.L. Cartaxo	1–0	Eléctrico F.C. (D)
A.D. Valecambrense	0–1	G.D. Pêgo (D)
G.D. Sesimbra	1–1 (1–2 p)	S.C. Borbense
A.C. Cacém	2–3	Touring C. Praia Mira (D)
C.F. Trafaria	2–1	A.D. Castelo Vide
Mortágua F.C.	2–0	S.C. Sabugal
A.C. Fronteirense	w/o	G.D. Prado
G.D. Alvaiázere (D)	0–0 (0–2 p)	Aliados F.C. Lordelo (D)
S.C. Leiria e Marrazes	1–1 (3–2 p)	G.D. Ribeirão
S.C. Vila Pouca Aguiar	5–0	U.D. Cariense (D)
U.D. Seia	3–1	Atlético S.C. Reguengos (D)
S.U. Alfeizerense	0–1	C.F. Valadares
C.D. Cinfães	2–3	F.C. Cortegaça (D)
S.C. Lamego (D)	0–3	Casa Pia A.C. (D)
Estrela de Vendas Novas	1–1 (5–4 p)	A.D.C. Santa Marta Penaguião
G.D. Quimigal	w/o	A.R.C.D. Ferrel
A.D. Camacha (D)	2–0	F.C. Marinhas (D)
S.C. Paivense	1–0	U.D. Lanheses

=== Second round ===
Home	Score	Away
G.D. Quimigal	1–0	Aliados F.C. Lordelo (D)
S.C. Leiria e Marrazes	3–2	F.C. Cortegaça (D)
S.C. Borbense	1–1 (4–3 p)	Casa Pia A.C. (D)
S.L. Cartaxo	6–0	A.C. Fronteirense
Mortágua F.C.	1–1 (5–3 p)	A.D. Camacha (D)
Estrela de Vendas Novas	3–0	Touring C. Praia Mira (D)
S.C. Vila Pouca Aguiar	1–0	C.F. Trafaria
S.C. Paivense	4–1	U.D. Seia
C.F. Valadares	3–2	G.D. Pêgo (D)
