= 1989–90 Segunda Divisão =

56th season of second-tier football league in Portugal

Segunda Divisão
- Season: 1989–90
- Champions: SC Salgueiros
- Promoted: SC Salgueiros; Gil Vicente FC; SC Farense

The 1989–90 Segunda Divisão season was the 56th season of recognised second-tier football in Portugal. It was the last regionalized contest for the second tier championship, as a new Segunda Liga took shape as an unified second tier from the next season onwards.

== Overview ==
The league was contested by 54 teams in 3 divisions with SC Salgueiros, Gil Vicente FC and SC Farense winning the respective divisional competitions and gaining promotion to the Primeira Liga. The overall championship was won by SC Salgueiros.

== League standings ==
=== Segunda Divisão - Zona Norte ===
Pos	Team	Pld	W	D	L	GF	GA	GD	Pts	Qualification
1	Gil Vicente F.C.	34	22	5	7	51	25	+26	49	Championship play-off
2	F.C. Famalicão	34	18	11	5	55	24	+31	47	Segunda Divisão de Honra
3	C.D. Aves	34	19	7	8	50	29	+21	45	Segunda Divisão de Honra
4	F.C. Paços de Ferreira	34	18	6	10	58	35	+23	42	Segunda Divisão de Honra
5	F.C. Maia	34	15	11	8	48	33	+15	41	Segunda Divisão de Honra
6	S.C. Freamunde	34	14	12	8	45	35	+10	40	Segunda Divisão de Honra
7	Varzim S.C.	34	15	8	11	46	36	+10	38	Segunda Divisão de Honra
8	Leixões S.C.	34	13	9	12	46	42	+4	35	Segunda Divisão de Honra play-off
9	AD Fafe	34	13	8	13	40	32	+8	34	
10	Rio Ave F.C.	34	10	11	13	44	47	−3	31	
11	F.C. Felgueiras	34	11	9	14	32	46	−14	31	
12	GD Bragança	34	12	7	15	39	52	−13	31	
13	F.C. Infesta	34	11	8	15	52	57	−5	30	
14	G.D. Joane	34	9	11	14	30	40	−10	29	
15	F.C. Vizela	34	10	7	17	35	46	−11	27	Segunda Divisão B play-off
16	SC Vianense	34	10	6	18	36	52	−16	26	Segunda Divisão B play-off
17	C.D. Trofense	34	7	8	19	29	60	−31	22	Segunda Divisão B play-off
18	F.C. Marco	34	3	8	23	18	63	−45	14	Segunda Divisão B play-off

=== Segunda Divisão - Zona Centro ===
Pos	Team	Pld	W	D	L	GF	GA	GD	Pts	Qualification or relegation
1	S.C. Salgueiros	34	22	7	5	82	24	+58	51	Championship play-off
2	S.C. Espinho	34	23	4	7	65	21	+44	50	Segunda Divisão de Honra
3	U.D. Leiria	34	20	9	5	61	18	+43	49	Segunda Divisão de Honra
4	Académica Coimbra	34	19	5	10	55	34	+21	43	Segunda Divisão de Honra
5	Académico Viseu	34	17	8	9	56	32	+24	42	Segunda Divisão de Honra
6	R.D. Águeda	34	15	8	11	43	36	+7	38	Segunda Divisão de Honra
7	Benfica Castelo Branco	34	13	9	12	36	42	−6	35	Segunda Divisão de Honra
8	União Mirense	34	13	9	12	42	39	+3	35	Segunda Divisão de Honra play-off
9	Os Marialvas	34	12	9	13	31	34	−3	33	
10	S.C. Covilhã	34	15	3	16	39	43	−4	33	
11	União Lamas	34	15	2	17	46	49	−3	32	
12	GD Mangualde	34	14	2	18	45	56	−11	30	
13	Caldas S.C.	34	13	4	17	33	52	−19	30	
14	AD Guarda	34	12	5	17	29	55	−26	29	
15	U.D. Oliveirense	34	11	6	17	37	45	−8	28	Segunda Divisão B play-off
16	CD Lousanense	34	10	7	17	37	59	−22	27	Segunda Divisão B play-off
17	Oliveira do Bairro	34	3	10	21	24	68	−44	16	Segunda Divisão B play-off
18	GD Peniche	34	3	5	26	16	70	−54	11	Segunda Divisão B play-off

=== Segunda Divisão - Zona Sul ===
Pos	Team	Pld	W	D	L	GF	GA	GD	Pts	Qualification or relegation
1	S.C. Farense	34	25	5	4	80	23	+57	55	Championship play-off
2	F.C. Barreirense	34	21	5	8	55	24	+31	47	Segunda Divisão de Honra
3	Louletano D.C.	34	18	10	6	51	25	+26	46	Segunda Divisão de Honra
4	O Elvas C.A.D.	34	18	8	8	52	25	+27	44	Segunda Divisão de Honra
5	S.C.U. Torreense	34	17	9	8	54	24	+30	43	Segunda Divisão de Honra
6	G.D. Estoril Praia	34	15	12	7	36	29	+7	42	Segunda Divisão de Honra
7	Lusitano VRSA	34	13	15	6	41	24	+17	41	Segunda Divisão de Honra
8	Juventude Évora	34	12	12	10	42	48	−6	36	Segunda Divisão de Honra play-off
9	F.C. Alverca	34	13	10	11	42	42	0	36	
10	S.C. Olhanense	34	12	10	12	38	38	0	34	
11	Silves FC	34	9	14	11	34	32	+2	32	
12	Lusitano Évora	34	8	12	14	41	54	−13	28	
13	Seixal F.C.	34	10	7	17	30	52	−22	27	
14	Atlético C.P.	34	9	7	18	39	46	−7	25	
15	C.D. Olivais e Moscavide	34	8	7	19	32	55	−23	23	Segunda Divisão B play-off
16	GD Portalegrense	34	6	11	17	31	73	−42	23	Segunda Divisão B play-off
17	S.U. Sintrense	34	5	7	22	22	65	−43	17	Segunda Divisão B play-off
18	GD Samora Correia	34	1	11	22	19	60	−41	13	Segunda Divisão B play-off

== Play-offs ==
=== Championship play-off ===
Pos	Team	Pld	W	D	L	GF	GA	GD	Pts	Promotion
1	S.C. Salgueiros (C)	4	2	1	1	6	3	+3	5	Promotion to Primeira Divisão
2	Gil Vicente F.C.	4	1	2	1	1	3	−2	4	Promotion to Primeira Divisão
3	S.C. Farense	4	0	3	1	2	3	−1	3	Promotion to Primeira Divisão

(C) Champions

=== Segunda Divisão de Honra play-off ===
Pos	Team	Pld	W	D	L	GF	GA	GD	Pts	Qualification
1	Leixões S.C. (P)	2	2	0	0	5	3	+2	4	Segunda Divisão de Honra
2	União Mirense	2	1	0	1	4	4	0	2	
3	Juventude Évora	2	0	0	2	4	6	−2	0	

(P) Promoted

=== Segunda Divisão B play-off ===
The Segunda Divisão B play-off was a single-match series featuring the four lowest-placed teams from each group of the second-tier Segunda Divisão, the six 6th-placed teams from each of the six series of the third-tier Terceira Divisão (3D), and the two best 7th-placed teams from across the six Terceira Divisão series. The 10 winners qualified to third-tier 1990–91 Segunda Divisão B, while the losing sides moved to fourth-tier 1990–91 Terceira Divisão.

Home	Score	Away
G.D. Peniche	0–2	Leça F.C. (3D)
GD Samora Correia	1–2	S.U. Sintrense
C.D. Torres Novas (3D)	1–2	CD Lousanense
Moura AC (3D)	0–2	F.C. Marco
C.D. Portalegrense	0–1	C.D. Trofense
GS Loures (3D)	2–0	S.R. Almancilense (3D)
C.D. Amadores de Caminha (3D)	0–5	U.D. Oliveirense
F.C. Vizela	2–0	C.P. Fátima (3D)
C.F. União de Coimbra (3D)	1–1 (3–1 p)	SC Vianense
Oliveira do Bairro S.C.	1–2 (a.e.t.)	C.D. Olivais e Moscavide
