= 1988–89 Segunda Divisão =

55th season of second-tier football league in Portugal

Segunda Divisão
- Season: 1988–89
- Champions: União da Madeira
- Promoted: União da Madeira; Feirense; Tirsense

The 1988–89 Segunda Divisão season was the 55th season of recognised second-tier football in Portugal. It started on 6 September 1988 and ended on 15 May 1989.

== Overview ==
The league was contested by 54 teams in 3 divisions with União da Madeira, Feirense and Tirsense winning the respective divisional competitions and gaining promotion to the Primeira Liga. The overall championship was won by União da Madeira.

== League standings ==
=== Segunda Divisão - Zona Norte ===
Pos	Team	Pld	W	D	L	GF	GA	GD	Pts	Promotion or relegation
1	Tirsense (C)	34	20	10	4	56	23	+33	50	Promotion to Primeira Divisão
2	Freamunde	34	17	9	8	55	33	+22	43	
3	Gil Vicente	34	18	7	9	49	30	+19	43	
4	Rio Ave	34	16	9	9	51	30	+21	41	
5	Desportivo das Aves	34	14	12	8	54	36	+18	40	
6	Varzim	34	12	14	8	47	37	+10	38	
7	Felgueiras	34	12	13	9	45	35	+10	37	
8	Paços de Ferreira	34	16	5	13	42	40	+2	37	
9	Vizela	34	12	11	11	38	38	0	35	
10	Joane	34	9	17	8	37	40	−3	35	
11	Salgueiros	38	10	14	14	34	37	−3	34	
12	Trofense	34	9	14	11	27	38	−11	32	
13	Marco	34	12	8	14	47	57	−10	32	
14	Bragança	34	10	11	13	34	42	−8	31	
15	Paredes (R)	34	9	11	14	31	42	−11	29	Relegation to Terceira Divisão
16	Moreirense (R)	34	9	9	16	29	39	−10	27	Relegation to Terceira Divisão
17	Amarante (R)	34	4	9	21	26	64	−38	17	Relegation to Terceira Divisão
18	Santa Maria (R)	34	2	7	25	24	65	−41	11	Relegation to Terceira Divisão

Source: Soccer Library
Rules for classification: 1st points, 2nd head-to-head, 3rd goals average
(C) Champions; (R) Relegated

=== Segunda Divisão - Zona Centro ===
Pos	Team	Pld	W	D	L	GF	GA	GD	Pts	Promotion or relegation
1	Feirense (C)	34	23	8	3	69	18	+51	54	Promotion to Primeira Divisão
2	Académica	34	21	10	3	66	23	+43	52	
3	Águeda	34	14	16	4	41	19	+22	44	
4	Marialvas	34	17	8	9	51	31	+20	42	
5	União de Lamas	34	15	10	9	47	29	+18	40	
6	Covilhã	34	16	6	12	60	31	+29	38	
7	Peniche	34	13	11	10	38	43	−5	37	
8	Caldas	34	14	8	12	56	43	+13	36	
9	Oliveira do Bairro	34	10	13	11	23	32	−9	33	
10	União de Leiria	34	9	13	12	42	44	−2	31	
11	Portalegrense	34	12	7	15	39	47	−8	31	
12	Lousanense	34	12	7	15	42	53	−11	31	
13	Mangualde	34	11	9	14	34	46	−12	31	
14	Mealhada (R)	34	8	10	16	32	52	−20	26	Relegation to Terceira Divisão
15	Luso (R)	34	7	12	15	31	43	−12	26	Relegation to Terceira Divisão
16	Marinhense (R)	34	6	11	17	22	59	−37	23	Relegation to Terceira Divisão
17	Estrela Portalegre (R)	34	4	12	18	17	41	−24	20	Relegation to Terceira Divisão
18	Estarreja (R)	34	5	7	22	29	85	−56	17	Relegation to Terceira Divisão

Source: Zona Centro - Foradejogo and Soccer Library
Rules for classification: 1st points, 2nd head-to-head, 3rd goals average
(C) Champions; (R) Relegated

=== Segunda Divisão - Zona Sul ===
Pos	Team	Pld	W	D	L	GF	GA	GD	Pts	Promotion or relegation
1	União da Madeira (C)	34	20	9	5	54	22	+32	49	Promotion to Primeira Divisão
2	Louletano	34	18	11	5	59	26	+33	47	
3	O Elvas	34	17	9	8	47	32	+15	43	
4	Olhanense	34	13	12	9	42	32	+10	38	
5	Torreense	34	13	12	9	42	32	+10	38	
6	Estoril	34	12	12	10	33	27	+6	36	
7	Atlético CP	34	12	11	11	40	34	+6	35	
8	Alverca	34	13	9	12	42	38	+4	35	
9	Olivais e Moscavide	34	14	6	14	35	41	−6	34	
10	Juventude de Évora	34	10	13	11	43	43	0	33	
11	Barreirense	34	11	11	12	41	48	−7	33	
12	Lusitano de Évora	34	9	13	12	27	31	−4	31	
13	Silves	34	8	14	12	34	50	−16	30	
14	Oriental (R)	34	9	12	13	30	40	−10	30	Relegation to Terceira Divisão
15	União de Santiago (R)	34	11	7	16	33	50	−17	29	Relegation to Terceira Divisão
16	Esperança Lagos (R)	34	9	7	18	31	49	−18	25	Relegation to Terceira Divisão
17	Montijo (R)	34	8	8	18	40	54	−14	24	Relegation to Terceira Divisão
18	Sacavanense (R)	34	5	12	17	21	53	−32	22	Relegation to Terceira Divisão

Source: Zona Sul - Foradejogo and Soccer Library
Rules for classification: 1st points, 2nd head-to-head, 3rd goals average
(C) Champions; (R) Relegated

== Play-offs ==
=== Championship play-off ===
Pos	Team	Pld	W	D	L	GF	GA	GD	Pts	Promotion
1	União da Madeira (C, P)	4	2	1	1	4	3	+1	5	Promotion to Primeira Divisão
2	Tirsense (P)	4	2	0	2	5	4	+1	4	Promotion to Primeira Divisão
3	Feirense (P)	4	1	1	2	5	7	−2	3	Promotion to Primeira Divisão

Source: Playoff - Foradejogo and Soccer Library
Rules for classification: 1st points, 2nd head-to-head, 3rd goals average
(C) Champions; (P) Promoted
