= 1986–87 Terceira Divisão =

Terceira Divisão
- Season: 1986–87
- Champions: Louletano D.C. 1st title
- Promoted: 16 teams

The 1986–87 Terceira Divisão season was the 40th season of the competition and the 40th season of recognised third-tier football in Portugal.

== Overview ==
The league was contested by 96 teams distributed across 6 groups of 16 teams each. SC Vianense, F.C. Marco, Oliveira do Bairro S.C., Caldas S.C., G.D.P. Costa de Caparica, and Louletano D.C. won their respective groups and advanced to the Championship play-off. Louletano D.C. was the overall champion after defeating F.C. Marco 1–0 in the Championship final.

Due to the league's enlargement to 120 teams in 1987–88, no team was relegated this season.

== League standings ==
=== Terceira Divisão – Group 1 ===
Pos	Team	Pld	W	D	L	GF	GA	GD	Pts	Promotion or relegation
1	SC Vianense	30	16	8	6	51	21	+30	40	Advance to Championship play-off
2	Moreirense F.C.	30	16	7	7	52	28	+24	39	Promotion to Segunda Divisão
3	C.A. Macedo de Cavaleiros	30	13	10	7	38	19	+19	36	Promotion to Segunda Divisão
4	F.C. Vinhais	30	14	7	9	36	23	+13	35	
5	Santa Maria F.C.	30	10	11	9	30	28	+2	31	
6	Vieira S.C.	30	12	7	11	32	32	0	31	
7	A.D. Ponte da Barca	30	10	11	9	30	34	−4	31	
8	A.D. Esposende	30	10	10	10	35	35	0	30	
9	C.R.P. Delães	30	9	12	9	40	43	−3	30	
10	G.D. Joane	30	10	10	10	25	29	−4	30	
11	C.A. Valdevez	30	11	8	11	35	42	−7	30	
12	Merelinense F.C.	30	9	12	9	30	39	−9	30	
13	Neves F.C.	30	11	7	12	31	39	−8	29	
14	F.C. Amares	30	10	8	12	35	35	0	28	
15	A.D. Os Limianos	30	10	4	16	37	37	0	24	
16	G.D. Valpaços	30	2	2	26	14	67	−53	6	

=== Terceira Divisão – Group 2 ===
Pos	Team	Pld	W	D	L	GF	GA	GD	Pts	Promotion or relegation
1	F.C. Marco	30	16	10	4	43	19	+24	42	Advance to Championship play-off
2	C.F. União de Lamas	30	18	6	6	47	28	+19	42	Promotion to Segunda Divisão
3	Ermesinde S.C.	30	15	8	7	45	23	+22	38	Promotion to Segunda Divisão
4	Leça F.C.	30	12	11	7	36	25	+11	35	
5	U.S.C. Paredes	30	12	8	10	26	18	+8	32	
6	A.D. Ovarense	30	12	8	10	38	31	+7	32	
7	Amarante F.C.	30	12	8	10	51	48	+3	32	
8	F.C. Infesta	30	11	9	10	47	35	+12	31	
9	S.C. Vila Real	30	11	9	10	39	35	+4	31	
10	S.C. Paivense	30	11	8	11	33	34	−1	30	
11	A.R. São Martinho	30	9	11	10	25	22	+3	29	
12	U.D. Valonguense	30	10	9	11	27	30	−3	29	
13	A.D. Lousada	30	8	12	10	29	35	−6	28	
14	F.C. Cesarense	30	6	10	14	24	46	−22	22	
15	Pedrouços A.C.	30	6	7	17	24	47	−23	19	
16	C.F. Oliveira do Douro	30	1	6	23	17	75	−58	8	

=== Terceira Divisão – Group 3 ===
Pos	Team	Pld	W	D	L	GF	GA	GD	Pts	Promotion or relegation
1	Oliveira do Bairro S.C.	30	21	5	4	49	16	+33	47	Advance to Championship play-off
2	C.F. Os Marialvas	30	17	7	6	41	28	+13	41	Promotion to Segunda Divisão
3	Anadia F.C.	30	13	9	8	26	18	+8	35	
4	G.D. Mealhada	30	12	10	8	32	24	+8	34	
5	Naval 1º Maio	30	13	6	11	43	34	+9	32	
6	U.D. Oliveirense	30	12	7	11	41	36	+5	31	
7	G.D. Tabuense	30	12	7	11	35	45	−10	31	
8	Sport Viseu e Benfica	30	12	6	12	45	35	+10	30	
9	U.D. Seia	30	10	10	10	39	29	+10	30	
10	C.D. Tondela	30	11	7	12	34	39	−5	29	
11	C.D. Luso	30	10	9	11	26	33	−7	29	
12	F.C. Oliveira do Hospital	30	12	4	14	38	34	+4	28	
13	G.D. Santacombadense	30	8	7	15	28	42	−14	23	
14	C.D. Gouveia	30	5	12	13	23	37	−14	22	
15	A.R.C. Oliveirinha	30	6	9	15	33	51	−18	21	
16	U.D. Belmonte	30	7	3	20	20	52	−32	17	

=== Terceira Divisão – Group 4 ===
Pos	Team	Pld	W	D	L	GF	GA	GD	Pts	Promotion or relegation
1	Caldas S.C.	30	22	2	6	48	16	+32	46	Advance to Championship play-off
2	União de Santarém	30	20	5	5	51	18	+33	45	Promotion to Segunda Divisão
3	G.D. Portalegrense	30	15	6	9	43	26	+17	36	
4	A.R.C. Usseira	30	10	13	7	41	35	+6	33	
5	C.D. Alcains	30	12	8	10	37	36	+1	32	
6	A.R.C.D. Ferrel	30	11	9	10	38	43	−5	31	
7	Sport Benfica e Castelo Branco	30	14	2	14	30	41	−11	30	
8	S.C. Leiria e Marrazes	30	9	11	10	37	30	+7	29	
9	Eléctrico F.C.	30	9	10	11	35	34	+1	28	
10	C.D. Lousanense	30	11	6	13	34	34	0	28	
11	C.P. Fátima	30	10	7	13	33	35	−2	27	
12	G.C. Alcobaça	30	10	7	13	34	40	−6	27	
13	S.C.E. Bombarralense	30	11	5	14	26	34	−8	27	
14	G.D. Guiense	30	8	7	15	23	44	−21	23	
15	CA Mirandense	30	5	9	16	23	45	−22	19	
16	G.D. Nazarenos	30	5	9	16	21	43	−22	19	

=== Terceira Divisão – Group 5 ===
Pos	Team	Pld	W	D	L	GF	GA	GD	Pts	Promotion or relegation
1	G.D.P. Costa de Caparica	30	18	5	7	58	30	+28	41	Advance to Championship play-off
2	C.D. Santa Clara	30	16	8	6	54	29	+25	40	Promotion to Segunda Divisão
3	U.D. Vilafranquense	30	14	11	5	35	19	+16	39	Promotion to Segunda Divisão
4	C.D. Olivais e Moscavide	30	14	10	6	46	28	+18	38	
5	S.C. Campomaiorense	30	13	9	8	65	30	+35	35	
6	S.L. Olivais	30	12	8	10	36	39	−3	32	
7	Vitória C. Lisboa	30	12	7	11	37	31	+6	31	
8	A.C. Cacém	30	11	9	10	31	27	+4	31	
9	G.D. Vialonga	30	11	9	10	43	40	+3	31	
10	S.U. Sintrense	30	10	10	10	40	36	+4	30	
11	C.F. Santa Iria	30	9	10	11	31	41	−10	28	
12	G.D. Quimigal	30	10	6	14	34	37	−3	26	
13	S.C. Praiense	30	8	9	13	41	47	−6	25	
14	S.L. Cartaxo	30	6	12	12	30	43	−13	24	
15	Odivelas F.C.	30	7	10	13	17	34	−17	24	
16	A.C. Fronteirense	30	0	5	25	10	97	−87	5	

=== Terceira Divisão – Group 6 ===
Pos	Team	Pld	W	D	L	GF	GA	GD	Pts	Promotion or relegation
1	Louletano D.C.	30	18	9	3	56	17	+39	45	Advance to Championship play-off
2	Silves F.C.	30	17	6	7	52	25	+27	40	Promotion to Segunda Divisão
3	Amora F.C.	30	15	10	5	44	22	+22	40	Promotion to Segunda Divisão
4	G.D. Torralta	30	15	8	7	56	21	+35	38	
5	Lusitano de Évora	30	15	4	11	34	27	+7	34	
6	Vasco Gama A.C. Sines	30	13	8	9	32	40	−8	34	
7	Juventude de Évora	30	13	6	11	50	45	+5	32	
8	Moura AC	30	10	10	10	32	33	−1	30	
9	Imortal D.C.	30	10	9	11	39	33	+6	29	
10	G.D.R. Alvorense	30	10	9	11	29	33	−4	29	
11	G.D. Sesimbra	30	10	9	11	36	41	−5	29	
12	Seixal F.C.	30	10	8	12	25	31	−6	28	
13	Atlético S.C. Reguengos	30	7	11	12	21	43	−22	25	
14	C.D.R. Quarteirense	30	5	9	16	24	49	−25	19	
15	J.S. Campinense	30	5	6	19	23	55	−32	16	
16	Piense S.C.	30	3	6	21	20	58	−38	12	

== Championship play-off ==
=== Championship play-off – Zone 1 ===
Pos	Team	Pld	W	D	L	GF	GA	GD	Pts	Promotion
1	F.C. Marco	4	2	1	1	4	3	+1	5	Promotion to Segunda Divisão
2	Oliveira do Bairro S.C.	4	2	0	2	3	4	−1	4	Promotion to Segunda Divisão
3	SC Vianense	4	1	1	2	4	4	0	3	Promotion to Segunda Divisão

=== Championship play-off – Zone 2 ===
Pos	Team	Pld	W	D	L	GF	GA	GD	Pts	Promotion
1	Louletano D.C.	4	3	0	1	8	6	+2	6	Promotion to Segunda Divisão
2	Caldas S.C.	4	2	1	1	7	4	+3	5	Promotion to Segunda Divisão
3	G.D.P. Costa de Caparica	4	0	1	3	3	8	−5	1	Promotion to Segunda Divisão

=== Championship final ===
7 July 1987
17:00

F.C. Marco	0 – 1	Louletano D.C.

Estádio Municipal do Marco de Canaveses, Marco de Canaveses
