= A.C.R. Alvorense 1º Dezembro =

Portuguese football club

ACR Alvorense 1 Dezembro
- Full name: Associação Cultural e Recreativa Alvorense 1º Dezembro
- Founded: 1934
- Ground: Estádio da Restinga; Alvor, Portimão; Portugal
- Capacity: 200
- League: AF Algarve – 1ª Divisão
- Website: http://acralvorense.org

Associação Cultural e Recreativa Alvorense 1º Dezembro (abbreviated as ACR Alvorense 1 Dezembro or ACRA 1 Dezembro) is a Portuguese football club based in Alvor, Portimão in the Algarve.

== Background ==
ACR Alvorense 1 Dezembro currently plays in the AF Algarve – 1ª Divisão which is the fifth tier of Portuguese football. The club was founded in 1934 and they play their home matches at the Estádio da Restinga in Alvor, Portimão. Up until 1999/2000 the club was known as Grupo Desportivo Recreativo Alvorense (abbreviated as GDR Alvorense). The most successful period in the club's history was from 1980 until 1991 when they spent 9 seasons in the Terceira Divisão, which until 1990 was the third tier of Portuguese football. Their best season was in 1983/84 when the club finished 4th in Série F.

The club is affiliated to Associação de Futebol do Algarve and has competed in the AF Algarve Taça. The club has also entered the national cup known as Taça de Portugal and has completed 17 games in the competition.

== Season to season ==
Season	Level	Division	Section	Place	Movements
1980–01	Tier 3	Terceira Divisão	Série F	8th	
1981–82	Tier 3	Terceira Divisão	Série F	12th	
1982–83	Tier 3	Terceira Divisão	Série F	10th	
1983–84	Tier 3	Terceira Divisão	Série F	4th	
1984–85	Tier 3	Terceira Divisão	Série F	16th	Relegated
1985–86	Tier 4	Distritais	AF Algarve – 1ª Divisão		Promoted
1986–87	Tier 3	Terceira Divisão	Série F	10th	
1987–88	Tier 3	Terceira Divisão	Série F	10th	
1988–89	Tier 3	Terceira Divisão	Série F	16th	Relegated
1989–90	Tier 4	Distritais	AF Algarve – 1ª Divisão		Promoted
1990–91	Tier 4	Terceira Divisão	Série F	14th	Relegated
1991–92	Tier 5	Distritais	AF Algarve – 1ª Divisão		
1992–93	Tier 5	Distritais	AF Algarve – 1ª Divisão		
1993–94	Tier 5	Distritais	AF Algarve – 1ª Divisão		
1994–95	Tier 5	Distritais	AF Algarve – 1ª Divisão		
1995–96	Tier 5	Distritais	AF Algarve – 1ª Divisão		
1996–97	Tier 5	Distritais	AF Algarve – 1ª Divisão		
1997–98	Tier 5	Distritais	AF Algarve – 1ª Divisão		
1998–99	Tier 5	Distritais	AF Algarve – 1ª Divisão	3rd	
1999–2000	Tier 5	Distritais	AF Algarve – 1ª Divisão	9th	
2000–01	Tier 5	Distritais	AF Algarve – 1ª Divisão	7th	
2001–02	Tier 5	Distritais	AF Algarve – 1ª Divisão	5th	
2002–03	Tier 5	Distritais	AF Algarve – 1ª Divisão	16th	Relegated
2003–04	Tier 6	Distritais	AF Algarve – 2ª Divisão	9th	
2004–05	Tier 6	Distritais	AF Algarve – 2ª Barlavento	2nd	
2005–06	Tier 6	Distritais	AF Algarve – 2ª Barlavento	1st	Promoted
2006–07	Tier 5	Distritais	AF Algarve – 1ª Divisão	3rd	
2007–08	Tier 5	Distritais	AF Algarve – 1ª Divisão	7th	
2008–09	Tier 5	Distritais	AF Algarve – 1ª Divisão	15th	Relegated
2009–10	Tier 6	Distritais	AF Algarve – 2ª Divisão	7th	
2010–11	Tier 6	Distritais	AF Algarve – 2ª Divisão	1st	Promoted
2011–12	Tier 5	Distritais	AF Algarve – 1ª Divisão	16th	Relegated

== Notable players ==
- (Portugal) Hélder Lourenço
- (Portugal) Paulo José Rocha
