= Pedro Simões =

Portuguese footballer

Personal information
- Full name: Pedro Miguel Gonçalves Simões
- Date of birth: 5 February 1999 (age 27)
- Place of birth: Albufeira, Portugal
- Position: Midfielder

Team information
- Current team: Esperança de Lagos
- Number: 11

Youth career
- 2007–2011: Armacenenses
- 2011–2012: Odiáxere
- 2012–2015: Imortal
- 2015–2017: Portimonense
- 2017–2018: Farense

Senior career*
Years	Team	Apps	(Gls)
2018–2021	Farense	5	(1)
2020	→ Esperança de Lagos (loan)	6	(1)
2020–2021	→ Louletano (loan)	19	(2)
2021–	Esperança de Lagos	41	(4)
- * Club domestic league appearances and goals as of 20:43, 20 July 2023 (UTC)

Pedro Miguel Gonçalves Simões (born 5 February 1999) is a Portuguese professional footballer who plays for Esperança de Lagos as a midfielder.

== Football career ==
On 16 December 2018, Simões made his professional debut with Farense in a 2018–19 LigaPro match against Estoril Praia. On 9 January 2020, Simões joined CF Esperança Lagos on loan for the rest of the season.
