= 1993–94 Segunda Divisão B =

Segunda Divisão
- Season: 1993–94
- Champions: Amora FC
- Promoted: CD Feirense; União Lamas; Amora FC
- Relegated: 11 teams

The 1993–94 Segunda Divisão season was the 60th season of the competition and the 47th season of recognised third-tier football in Portugal.

== Overview ==
The league was contested by 54 teams in 3 divisions with CD Feirense, União Lamas and Amora FC winning the respective divisional competitions and gaining promotion to the Liga de Honra. The overall championship was won by Amora FC.

== League standings ==
=== Segunda Divisão - Zona Norte ===
Pos	Team	Pld	W	D	L	GF	GA	GD	Pts	Promotion or relegation
1	União Lamas	34	23	5	6	65	33	+32	51	Promotion to Liga de Honra
2	Moreirense FC	34	23	5	6	77	37	+40	51	
3	Lusitânia Lourosa	34	18	10	6	71	36	+35	46	
4	FC Maia	34	16	9	9	50	34	+16	41	
5	Lixa FC	34	16	8	10	47	45	+2	40	
6	Varzim SC	34	14	8	12	47	46	+1	36	
7	Juventude Ronfe	34	8	18	8	41	44	−3	34	
8	FC Marco	34	13	8	13	42	36	+6	34	
9	AD Esposende	34	11	11	12	38	36	+2	33	
10	Infesta FC	34	12	8	14	58	67	−9	32	
11	AD Fafe	34	12	8	14	50	51	−1	32	
12	AD Lousada	34	10	12	12	43	55	−12	32	
13	FC Vizela	34	10	11	13	44	39	+5	31	
14	Dragões Sandinenses	34	10	10	14	37	40	−3	30	
15	SC Vila Real	34	10	9	15	31	34	−3	29	Relegation to Terceira Divisão
16	União Paredes	34	6	13	15	29	38	−9	25	Relegation to Terceira Divisão
17	FC Amares	34	8	6	20	31	69	−38	22	Relegation to Terceira Divisão
18	Ermesinde SC	34	1	11	22	21	82	−61	13	Relegation to Terceira Divisão

=== Segunda Divisão - Zona Centro ===
Pos	Team	Pld	W	D	L	GF	GA	GD	Pts	Promotion or relegation
1	CD Feirense	34	23	7	4	73	30	+43	53	Promotion to Liga de Honra
2	GD Peniche	34	15	9	10	48	35	+13	39	
3	Caldas SC	34	11	16	7	42	27	+15	38	
4	SC Lourinhanense	34	13	12	9	48	43	+5	38	
5	AD Guarda	34	15	7	12	53	38	+15	37	
6	Benfica Castelo Branco	34	11	14	9	34	34	0	36	
7	UD Oliveirense	34	13	10	11	43	43	0	36	
8	AD Sanjoanense	34	12	10	12	41	30	+11	34	
9	Oliveira do Hospital	34	12	10	12	34	37	−3	34	
10	AC Marinhense	34	13	8	13	46	40	+6	34	
11	União Coimbra	34	11	11	12	33	37	−4	33	
12	RD Águeda	34	10	13	11	35	35	0	33	
13	CD Fátima	34	10	13	11	34	36	−2	33	
14	Naval 1º Maio	34	11	11	12	34	39	−5	33	
15	CD Torres Novas	34	10	12	12	42	53	−11	32	
16	SC Covilhã	34	6	14	14	35	48	−13	26	Relegation to Terceira Divisão
17	GD Mealhada	34	5	13	16	19	55	−36	23	Relegation to Terceira Divisão
18	CD Lousanense	34	7	6	21	28	62	−34	20	Relegation to Terceira Divisão

=== Segunda Divisão - Zona Sul ===
Pos	Team	Pld	W	D	L	GF	GA	GD	Pts	Promotion or relegation
1	Amora FC	34	19	9	6	59	26	+33	47	Promotion to Liga de Honra
2	SC Olhanense	34	18	8	8	50	35	+15	44	
3	FC Alverca	34	16	11	7	38	27	+11	43	
4	CD Montijo	34	15	9	10	43	36	+7	39	
5	o Elvas CAD	34	13	12	9	52	42	+10	38	
6	Odivelas FC	34	11	13	10	41	34	+7	35	
7	União Montemor	34	11	13	10	31	40	−9	35	
8	CDR Quarteirense	34	13	8	13	43	39	+4	34	
9	CD Olivais e Moscavide	34	13	8	13	50	45	+5	34	
10	FC Barreirense	34	12	10	12	40	37	+3	34	
11	Oriental Lisboa	34	10	13	11	35	36	−1	33	
12	SL Fanhões	34	9	14	11	40	40	0	32	
13	Juventude Évora	34	10	12	12	38	41	−3	32	
14	Atlético CP	34	8	15	11	39	43	−4	31	
15	AD Camacha	34	12	7	15	30	39	−9	31	Relegation to Terceira Divisão
16	SU Sintrense	34	9	12	13	39	38	+1	30	Relegation to Terceira Divisão
17	AC Salir	34	8	10	16	34	64	−30	26	Relegation to Terceira Divisão
18	Esperança Lagos	34	3	8	23	17	57	−40	14	Relegation to Terceira Divisão
