= Rodrigo Macedo =

Portuguese footballer (born 1998)

Personal information
- Full name: Rodrigo Rafael Rita Macedo
- Date of birth: 14 July 1998 (age 28)
- Place of birth: Loulé, Portugal
- Height: 1.81 m (5 ft 11 in)
- Position: Defender

Youth career
- –2016: Louletano

Senior career*
| Years | Team | Apps | (Gls) |
| 2016–2020 | Louletano | 51 | (0) |
| 2020–2021 | Esperança de Lagos | 9 | (0) |
| 2021–2022 | Imortal | 13 | (2) |
| 2022–2023 | Dubnica | 13 | (0) |
| 2024 | Haka | 6 | (0) |
- * Club domestic league appearances and goals as of 10 August 2024

Rodrigo Rafael Rita Macedo (born 14 July 1998) is a Portuguese professional football player who plays as a defender.

== Club career ==
Macedo started football in Portugal with a local club Louletano, and played five seasons in country's third and fourth tier Campeonato de Portugal, with Louletano, Esperança de Lagos and Imortal.

After a one-season stint in Slovakia's 2. Liga with FK Dubnica, Macedo moved to Finland and signed with Veikkausliiga club FC Haka one a one-year deal with an option for one more. He will reunite with his former coach Andy Smith. His contract was terminated in August.

== Career statistics ==
As of 10 August 2024.

Appearances and goals by club, season and competition
| Club | Season | League | | | Cup (Note: Includes Taça de Portugal and Suomen Cup) | | Other | | Total | |
| Club | Season | Division | Apps | Goals | Apps | Goals | Apps | Goals | Apps | Goals |
|---|---|---|---|---|---|---|---|---|---|---|
| Louletano | 2015–16 | Campeonato de Portugal | 3 | 0 | – | | – | | 3 | 0 |
| Louletano | 2016–17 | Campeonato de Portugal | 1 | 0 | – | | – | | 1 | 0 |
| Louletano | 2017–18 | Campeonato de Portugal | 10 | 0 | – | | – | | 10 | 0 |
| Louletano | 2018–19 | Campeonato de Portugal | 26 | 0 | 1 | 0 | – | | 27 | 0 |
| Louletano | 2019–20 | Campeonato de Portugal | 11 | 0 | – | | – | | 11 | 0 |
| Louletano | Total | | 51 | 0 | 1 | 0 | – | – | 52 | 0 |
| Esperança de Lagos | 2020–21 | Campeonato de Portugal | 9 | 0 | – | | – | | 9 | 0 |
| Imortal | 2020–21 | Campeonato de Portugal | 13 | 2 | – | | – | | 13 | 2 |
| Dubnica | 2022–23 | 2. Liga Slovakia | 13 | 0 | – | | – | | 13 | 0 |
| Haka | 2024 | Veikkausliiga | 6 | 0 | 2 | 0 | 1 (Note: Includes Finnish League Cup) | 0 | 9 | 0 |
| Career total | | | 92 | 2 | 3 | 0 | 1 | 0 | 96 | 2 |
