= 1987–88 Terceira Divisão =

Terceira Divisão
- Season: 1987–88
- Champions: G.D. Portalegrense; 2nd title
- Promoted: 12 teams
- Relegated: 42 teams

The 1987–88 Terceira Divisão season was the 41st season of the competition and the 41st season of recognised third-tier football in Portugal.

== Overview ==
The league was contested by 120 teams distributed across 6 groups of 20 teams each. Santa Maria F.C., U.S.C. Paredes, C.D. Luso, G.D. Portalegrense, C.D. Olivais e Moscavide, and Juventude de Évora won their respective groups and advanced to the Championship play-off. G.D. Portalegrense was the overall champion after defeating C.D. Luso 1–0 in the Championship final.

== League standings ==
=== Terceira Divisão – Group 1 ===
Pos	Team	Pld	W	D	L	GF	GA	GD	Pts	Promotion or relegation
1	Santa Maria F.C.	38	21	11	6	68	25	+43	53	Advance to Championship play-off
2	G.D. Joane	38	21	11	6	54	21	+33	53	Promotion to Segunda Divisão
3	S.C. Valenciano	38	21	8	9	59	32	+27	50	
4	Vieira S.C.	38	19	11	8	52	34	+18	49	
5	F.C. Vinhais	38	17	11	10	60	37	+23	45	
6	A.D. Ponte da Barca	38	16	11	11	60	45	+15	43	
7	C.R.P. Delães	38	15	10	13	60	60	0	40	
8	A.D. Esposende	38	14	11	13	54	50	+4	39	
9	C.A. Valdevez	38	15	9	14	46	41	+5	39	
10	Neves F.C.	38	12	14	12	37	35	+2	38	
11	G.D. Valpaços	38	13	11	14	50	52	−2	37	
12	G.D. Mirandês	38	15	7	16	53	46	+7	37	
13	C.D. Celoricense	38	13	10	15	47	52	−5	36	
14	F.C. Amares	38	13	10	15	44	46	−2	36	Relegation to District Championship
15	Merelinense F.C.	38	12	10	16	38	48	−10	34	Relegation to District Championship
16	AD Oliveirense	38	8	17	13	35	41	−6	33	Relegation to District Championship
17	A.D. Os Limianos	38	10	11	17	32	57	−25	31	Relegation to District Championship
18	Murça S.C.	38	8	10	20	37	85	−48	26	Relegation to District Championship
19	SC Mirandela	38	7	9	22	32	70	−38	23	Relegation to District Championship
20	Desportivo Monção	38	6	6	26	31	72	−41	18	Relegation to District Championship

=== Terceira Divisão – Group 2 ===
Pos	Team	Pld	W	D	L	GF	GA	GD	Pts	Promotion or relegation
1	U.S.C. Paredes	38	22	12	4	65	26	+39	56	Advance to Championship play-off
2	Amarante F.C.	38	23	8	7	55	26	+29	54	Promotion to Segunda Divisão
3	F.C. Maia	38	21	11	6	71	27	+44	53	
4	S.C. Vila Real	38	20	8	10	70	34	+36	48	
5	F.C. Infesta	38	18	11	9	65	38	+27	47	
6	S.C. Dragões Sandinenses	38	19	9	10	55	38	+17	47	
7	Leça F.C.	38	19	6	13	51	44	+7	44	
8	U.D. Valonguense	38	14	12	12	50	42	+8	40	
9	Pedrouços A.C.	38	15	10	13	45	48	−3	40	
10	A.D. Lousada	38	13	13	12	42	37	+5	39	
11	C.F. Oliveira do Douro	38	15	8	15	47	50	−3	38	
12	S.C. Paivense	38	13	10	15	44	45	−1	36	
13	S.C. Régua	38	14	7	17	46	50	−4	35	
14	C.D. Cinfães	38	14	7	17	48	61	−13	35	Relegation to District Championship
15	A.D. Grijó	38	12	9	17	36	46	−10	33	Relegation to District Championship
16	G.D. Ribeirão	38	10	11	17	44	49	−5	31	Relegation to District Championship
17	S.C. Lamego	38	8	14	16	36	45	−9	30	Relegation to District Championship
18	A.R. São Martinho	38	10	10	18	33	55	−22	30	Relegation to District Championship
19	F.C. Cesarense	38	8	5	25	34	86	−52	21	Relegation to District Championship
20	S.C. Esmoriz	38	1	1	36	25	115	−90	3	Relegation to District Championship

=== Terceira Divisão – Group 3 ===
Pos	Team	Pld	W	D	L	GF	GA	GD	Pts	Promotion or relegation
1	C.D. Luso	38	26	11	1	79	13	+66	63	Advance to Championship play-off
2	G.D. Mealhada	38	21	10	7	64	29	+35	52	Promotion to Segunda Divisão
3	F.C. Oliveira do Hospital	38	18	13	7	49	22	+27	49	
4	J.A. Pessegueirense	38	18	13	7	60	38	+22	49	
5	U.D. Seia	38	17	13	8	47	32	+15	47	
6	A.R.C. Oliveirinha	38	14	15	9	40	30	+10	43	
7	Anadia F.C.	38	15	13	10	41	34	+7	43	
8	A.D. Ovarense	38	14	13	11	33	29	+4	41	
9	S.C. Alba	38	12	16	10	45	38	+7	40	
10	G.D. Santacombadense	38	10	20	8	34	29	+5	40	
11	U.D. Oliveirense	38	14	11	13	51	43	+8	39	
12	C.D. Gouveia	38	14	11	13	48	45	+3	39	
13	Sport Viseu e Benfica	38	13	13	12	41	41	0	39	
14	C.F. Vilanovenses	38	14	9	15	36	42	−6	37	Relegation to District Championship
15	C.D. Tondela	38	12	8	18	30	46	−16	32	Relegation to District Championship
16	A.D. Poiares	38	9	7	22	36	61	−25	25	Relegation to District Championship
17	S.C. Vilar Formoso	38	11	3	24	44	73	−29	25	Relegation to District Championship
18	G.D. Tabuense	38	6	10	22	33	58	−25	22	Relegation to District Championship
19	U.D. Belmonte	38	6	9	23	28	76	−48	21	Relegation to District Championship
20	U.D. Cariense	38	4	6	28	25	85	−60	14	Relegation to District Championship

=== Terceira Divisão – Group 4 ===
Pos	Team	Pld	W	D	L	GF	GA	GD	Pts	Promotion or relegation
1	G.D. Portalegrense	38	28	6	4	75	29	+46	62	Advance to Championship play-off
2	C.D. Lousanense	38	22	10	6	75	30	+45	54	Promotion to Segunda Divisão
3	C.P. Fátima	38	19	12	7	50	28	+22	50	
4	Naval 1º Maio	38	20	9	9	65	35	+30	49	
5	Sport Benfica e Castelo Branco	38	20	8	10	59	33	+26	48	
6	G.C. Alcobaça	38	16	11	11	48	30	+18	43	
7	S.C. Leiria e Marrazes	38	16	10	12	48	37	+11	42	
8	A.R.C. Usseira	38	15	10	13	48	41	+7	40	
9	A.C. Alcanenense	38	14	11	13	36	42	−6	39	
10	A.R.C.D. Ferrel	38	14	10	14	34	31	+3	38	
11	Beneditense CD	38	12	13	13	42	54	−12	37	
12	CA Mirandense	38	11	14	13	37	45	−8	36	
13	G.D. Nazarenos	38	12	11	15	46	57	−11	35	
14	I.D. Vieirense	38	10	13	15	38	59	−21	33	Relegation to District Championship
15	G.D. Guiense (Note: Club folded in 1988–89.)	38	10	12	16	41	58	−17	32	Relegation to District Championship
16	A.D. Fundão	38	10	10	18	38	48	−10	30	Relegation to District Championship
17	C.D. Alcains	38	9	10	19	29	44	−15	28	Relegation to District Championship
18	G.D. Sourense	38	10	7	21	39	66	−27	27	Relegation to District Championship
19	C.F. Gavionenses	38	6	11	21	28	61	−33	23	Relegation to District Championship
20	S. Nisa Benfica	38	4	6	28	20	68	−48	14	Relegation to District Championship

=== Terceira Divisão – Group 5 ===
Pos	Team	Pld	W	D	L	GF	GA	GD	Pts	Promotion or relegation
1	C.D. Olivais e Moscavide	38	26	8	4	70	25	+45	60	Advance to Championship play-off
2	F.C. Alverca	38	26	4	8	53	26	+27	56	Promotion to Segunda Divisão
3	S.U. Sintrense	38	21	9	8	63	33	+30	51	
4	S.L. Olivais	38	18	12	8	52	33	+19	48	
5	C.F. Benfica	38	17	12	9	47	44	+3	46	
6	S.C. Campomaiorense	38	16	13	9	54	27	+27	45	
7	S.C.E. Bombarralense	38	14	14	10	36	32	+4	42	
8	G.D. Quimigal	38	16	9	13	51	35	+16	41	
9	A.C. Cacém	38	15	11	12	41	38	+3	41	
10	S.L. Cartaxo	38	13	12	13	47	47	0	38	
11	G.D. Vialonga	38	14	10	14	34	30	+4	38	
12	S.C. Praiense	38	13	10	15	38	36	+2	36	
13	Estrela de Vendas Novas	38	15	6	17	46	53	−7	36	
14	C.F. Santa Iria	38	12	9	17	39	48	−9	33	Relegation to District Championship
15	Vitória C. Lisboa	38	7	15	16	34	42	−8	29	Relegation to District Championship
16	Odivelas F.C.	38	10	9	19	40	53	−13	29	Relegation to District Championship
17	G.D. Marinhais	38	8	13	17	30	55	−25	29	Relegation to District Championship
18	AC Malveira	38	10	7	21	36	52	−16	27	Relegation to District Championship
19	Eléctrico F.C.	38	6	8	24	25	73	−48	20	Relegation to District Championship
20	A.C. Fronteirense	38	2	11	25	26	80	−54	15	Relegation to District Championship

=== Terceira Divisão – Group 6 ===
Pos	Team	Pld	W	D	L	GF	GA	GD	Pts	Promotion or relegation
1	Juventude de Évora	38	27	7	4	74	24	+50	61	Advance to Championship play-off
2	Lusitano de Évora	38	25	8	5	69	21	+48	58	Promotion to Segunda Divisão
3	G.D. Torralta	38	20	12	6	70	20	+50	52	
4	União Montemor	38	20	10	8	94	39	+55	50	
5	C.D.R. Quarteirense	38	21	4	13	48	37	+11	46	
6	Imortal D.C.	38	16	12	10	48	36	+12	44	
7	Moura AC	38	16	9	13	70	48	+22	41	
8	Seixal F.C.	38	14	13	11	35	34	+1	41	
9	Vasco Gama A.C. Sines	38	14	12	12	45	45	0	40	
10	G.D.R. Alvorense	38	15	9	14	51	45	+6	39	
11	G.D. Sesimbra	38	13	12	13	43	51	−8	38	
12	Palmelense F.C.	38	13	10	15	50	57	−7	36	
13	Lusitano F.C. VRSA	38	10	13	15	33	49	−16	33	
14	Atlético S.C. Reguengos	38	11	10	17	38	48	−10	32	Relegation to District Championship
15	F.C. Serpa	38	12	8	18	48	66	−18	32	Relegation to District Championship
16	C.D. Pinhalnovense	38	7	13	18	44	69	−25	27	Relegation to District Championship
17	S.C. Mineiro Aljustrelense	38	8	10	20	28	48	−20	26	Relegation to District Championship
18	Leões F.C. Tavira	38	8	7	23	40	81	−41	23	Relegation to District Championship
19	J.S. Campinense	38	7	8	23	39	83	−44	22	Relegation to District Championship
20	Piense S.C.	38	6	7	25	29	95	−66	19	Relegation to District Championship

== Championship play-off ==
=== Championship play-off – Zone 1 ===
Pos	Team	Pld	W	D	L	GF	GA	GD	Pts	Promotion
1	C.D. Luso	4	2	1	1	4	2	+2	5	Promotion to Segunda Divisão
2	Santa Maria F.C.	4	1	2	1	3	4	−1	4	Promotion to Segunda Divisão
3	U.S.C. Paredes	4	1	1	2	2	3	−1	3	Promotion to Segunda Divisão

=== Championship play-off – Zone 2 ===
Pos	Team	Pld	W	D	L	GF	GA	GD	Pts	Promotion
1	G.D. Portalegrense	4	2	1	1	6	6	0	5	Promotion to Segunda Divisão
2	Juventude de Évora	4	2	0	2	6	6	0	4	Promotion to Segunda Divisão
3	C.D. Olivais e Moscavide	4	1	1	2	6	6	0	3	Promotion to Segunda Divisão

=== Championship final ===
3 July 1988

C.D. Luso	0 – 1	G.D. Portalegrense

Estádio Municipal de Tomar, Tomar
