= João Duarte =

João Duarte may refer to:

- João Duarte de Sousa (1862–1909), Portuguese politician
- João Duarte (numismatist) (born 1954), Portuguese numismatist
- João Duarte (footballer) (born 1993), Portuguese footballer who plays as a right-back
- João Ferreira Duarte (born 1947), Portuguese academic
