= Hélder Lourenço =

Portuguese footballer

Personal information
- Full name: Hélder Fernandes Lourenço
- Date of birth: 4 August 1954 (age 72)
- Place of birth: Alvor, Portugal
- Height: 1.81 m (5 ft 11 in)
- Position: Goalkeeper

Youth career
- Torralta

Senior career*
| Years | Team | Apps | (Gls) |
| 1972–1977 | Torralta | | |
| 1977–1980 | Portimonense | 0 | (0) |
| 1980–1981 | Esperança Lagos | | |
| 1981–1983 | Portimonense | 2 | (0) |
| 1983–1984 | União Madeira | | |
| 1984–1985 | Torralta | 16 | (0) |
| 1985–1986 | Esperança Lagos | | |
| 1986–1987 | Imortal | | |
| 1987–1988 | Alvorense | | |
| 1988–1989 | Lagoa | | |
| 1989–1992 | Alvorense | | |
| 1992–1993 | Mexilhoeira Grande | | |
| 1993–2004 | Alvorense | | |
| 2004–2006 | Armacenenses | | |
| 2006–2013 | Alvorense | | |
| 2013–2014 | Figueirense | | |
| 2014–2015 | Mexilhoeira Grande | | |
- * Club domestic league appearances and goals

Hélder Fernandes Lourenço (born 4 August 1954) is a Portuguese former footballer who played as a goalkeeper.

== Club career ==
Born in Alvor (Portimão), Algarve, Lourenço started playing for local G.D. Torralta, going on to spend five seasons with the team in his first spell, two in the third division. In 1981–82, in the second of his two stints with Algarve neighbours Portimonense SC, he appeared in two games in the Primeira Liga, with his team finishing in sixth position; he was also part of the roster the following year.

Lourenço's last spell with the professionals was in the 1984–85 campaign with first club Torralta, in the Segunda Liga. Subsequently, he moved to the lower leagues and amateur football, representing mainly A.C.R. Alvorense 1º Dezembro – previously known as Grupo Desportivo Recreativo Alvorense – and playing until well past his 50s.
