= Cléber Santana (footballer, born 1990) =

Brazilian footballer

Personal information
- Full name: Cléber Machado Santana
- Date of birth: 26 May 1990 (age 36)
- Place of birth: Salvador, Bahia Brazil
- Height: 1.93 m (6 ft 4 in)
- Position: Goalkeeper

Team information
- Current team: Amora

Youth career
- –2007: Brasiliense
- 2007: Gama
- 2008: Legião
- 2009: Alcanenense

Senior career*
Years	Team	Apps	(Gls)
2010–2012	Monsanto	39	(0)
2012–2013	Sertanense	24	(0)
2013–2014	Alcanenense	11	(0)
2014–2017	Torreense	89	(0)
2017–2018	Olhanense	28	(0)
2018–2019	Académico Viseu	0	(0)
2019	Olhanense	14	(0)
2019–2020	Amora	25	(0)
2020–2022	Cova da Piedade	20	(0)
2022	Oliveira do Hospital	9	(0)
2022–2023	Alverca	0	(0)
2023–	Amora	0	(0)
- * Club domestic league appearances and goals as of 30 July 2023

Cléber Machado Santana (born 26 May 1990) is a Brazilian professional footballer who plays as a goalkeeper for Amora.

== Career statistics ==
As of 10 January 2019

Appearances and goals by club, season and competition
Club	Season	League			National cup (Note: Includes Taça de Portugal.)		Other		Total	
Club	Season	Division	Apps	Goals	Apps	Goals	Apps	Goals	Apps	Goals
Monsanto	2010–11	Terceira Divisão	25	0	1	0	0	0	26	0
Monsanto	2011–12	Segunda Divisão	14	0	2	0	0	0	16	0
Monsanto	Total		39	0	3	0	0	0	42	0
Sertanense	2012–13	Segunda Divisão	24	0	2	0	0	0	26	0
Alcanenense	2013–14	Campeonato Nacional de Seniores	11	0	0	0	0	0	11	0
Torreense	2014–15	Campeonato Nacional de Seniores	28	0	2	0	0	0	30	0
Torreense	2015–16	Campeonato de Portugal	30	0	0	0	0	0	30	0
Torreense	2016–17	Campeonato de Portugal	31	0	4	0	0	0	35	0
Torreense	Total		89	0	6	0	0	0	95	0
Olhanense	2017–18	Campeonato de Portugal	28	0	1	0	0	0	29	0
Académico Viseu	2018–19	LigaPro	0	0	0	0	0	0	0	0
Olhanense	2018–19	Campeonato de Portugal	14	0	0	0	0	0	14	0
Amora	2019–20	Campeonato de Portugal	25	0	3	0	0	0	28	0
Cova da Piedade	2020–21	LigaPro	3	0	0	0	0	0	3	0
Career total			233	0	15	0	0	0	248	0
