= Algarve Football Association =

Portuguese football association

Associação de Futebol do Algarve
- Abbreviation: AF Algarve
- Formation: 1922
- Purpose: District Football Association
- Headquarters: Complexo Desportivo de Faro
- Location(s): 8000 - 788 Faro Portugal
- President: António Coelho Matosa
- Website: afalgarve.pt

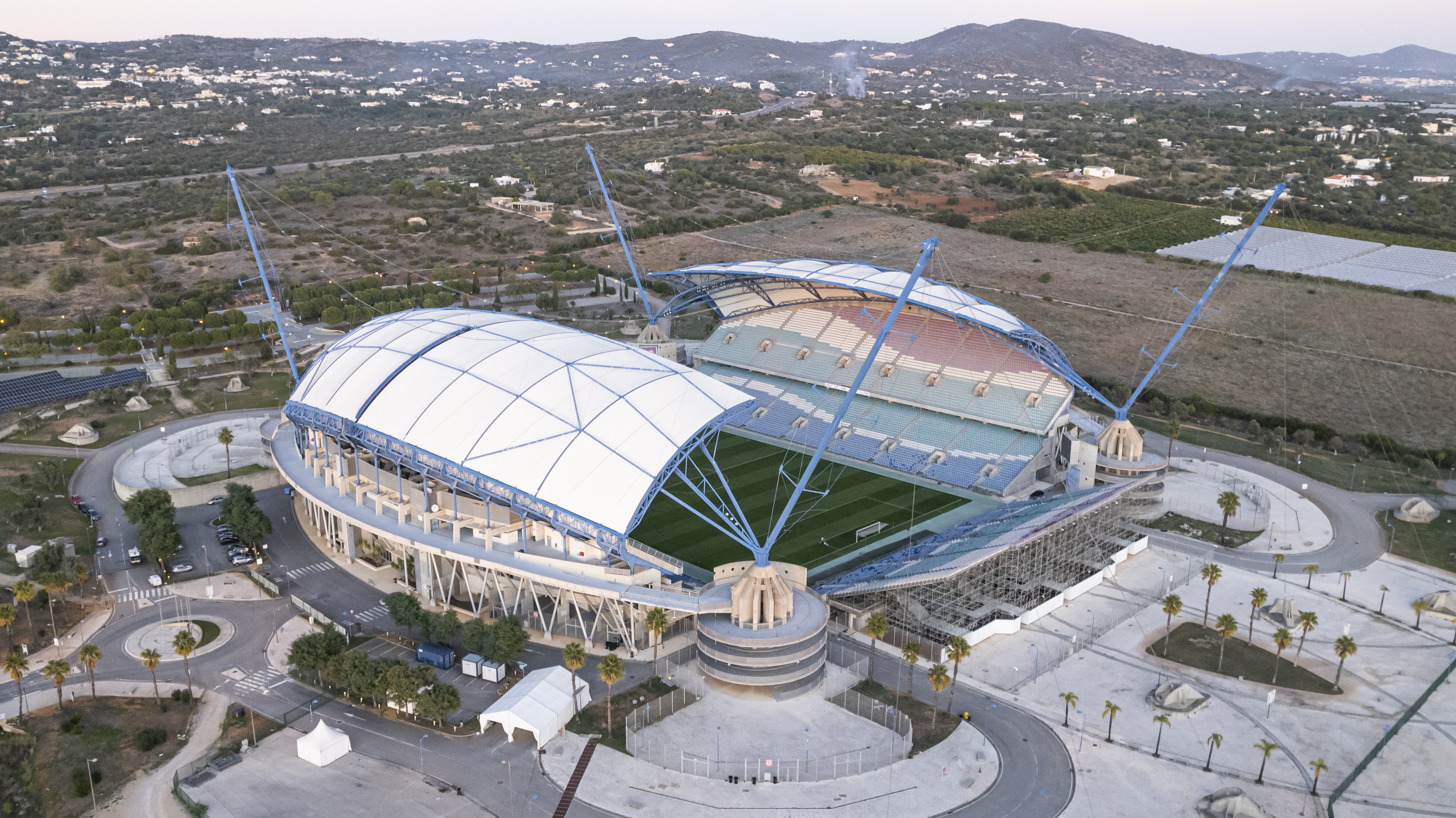
Estádio Algarve

The Associação de Futebol do Algarve (transl. Algarve Football Association) is one of the 22 district football associations that are affiliated to the Portuguese Football Federation. The AF Algarve administers lower tier football in the district of Faro.

== Background ==
Associação de Futebol do Algarve, commonly referred to as AF Algarve, is the governing body for football in the district of Faro. The Football Association is based in Penha in Faro, close to Piscinas Municipais de Faro (Faro Municipal Swimming Pool) and Complexo Desportivo da Penha (Sports Complex of Penha). The Association's President is António Coelho Matosa.

The organisation was established on 22 January 1922 following an initial meeting on 15 October 1921 at the Ginásio Clube Farense by representatives from a number of Algarve clubs including Sporting Clube Farense, Sport Lisboa e Faro, Boxing Futebol Clube (Portimão), Sporting Clube Olhanense, Lusitano Futebol Clube, Glória Futebol Clube, Portimonense Sporting Clube, Sport Club União, Sport Club "Os Leões Portimonenses" and Esperança Futebol Clube. The two previous attempts to establish a Football Association ended in failure.

== Competitions ==
Algarve clubs compete in the three national levels of the Portuguese football league system in competitions run by the Portuguese League for Professional Football (Primeira Liga and LigaPro) and Portuguese Football Federation (Campeonato de Portugal (league)).

Below the Campeonato de Portugal, the competitions are organised at a district level (known in Portuguese as Distritais) with each District Association organising its competitions according to geographical and other factors. The AF Algarve runs two league competitions with the Division One (1ª divisão) being at the fourth level of the league system and Division Two (2ª divisão) at the fifth level. At one time this second tier was divided into two groups on a geographical basis.

In more general terms the AF Algarve currently organises District Championships for Football and Futsal for men and women for all age groups including Senior, Junior, Youth, Beginners, Infants and Schools.

== Notable clubs affiliated to AF Algarve ==
Liga Portugal 2 (tier 2)

- Portimonense SC
- SC Farense

Campeonato de Portugal (league) (tier 3)

- Esperança de Lagos
- Louletano DC
- Moncarapachense
- SC Olhanense

Distritais (tiers 4 & 5)

- Almancilense
- C.D.R. Quarteirense
- Ferreiras
- Imortal Desportivo Clube
- Lusitano FC
- Operário
- Silves F.C.

== 2020–21 ==
AF Algarve Division One covering the regional fourth tier of the Portuguese football league system.

=== Division One (1ª divisão) ===
- Associação Farense 1910
- C.D.R. Quarteirense
- C.D Odiáxere
- C.F. Esperança Lagos
- C.U. Culatrense
- F.C. Ferreiras
- F.C. Os 11 Esperanças
- G.D. Lagoa
- Guia F.C.
- Imortal Desportivo Club Albufeira
- Louletano D.C.
- Lusitano FC
- Quarteira S.C.
- Silves F.C.
- S.R. Almancilense

At the end of the season the champions will be promoted to the national third tier. The team placed second gains entry to the Portuguese FA Cup. The three lowest teams will be relegated to Algarve League Division Two.

=== Division Two (2ª divisão) ===
- 4 ao Cubo Olhāo
- Carvoeiro United
- C.D. Marítimo Olhanense
- C.D.R. Quarteirense
- International Club Almancil
- JS Campinense
- Padernense Clube
- Portimenense S.C. B
- S.C. Farense B
- UDR Sambrasense

The winners will be promoted to Division One.

=== Taça do Algarve ===
The regional cup competition is competed for by the teams above, plus those in the national third tier.

It is of note that the number of clubs in the Algarve has declined significantly in recent years. Among the casualties are Campinense, Castromarinense, Infante de Sagres, Beira Mar Monte Gordo, Serrano (São Marcos da Serra), Bensafrim. Os Machados and Internacional Almancil.

== Former participants ==
Other clubs that have competed in the Distritais include:

- Algarve United Futebol SAD
- Associação Académica da Universidade do Algarve
- Associação Ases de Alcantarilha
- Associação Cultural de Salir
- Associação Recreativa Cultural Amorosa
- Casa do Povo da Mexilhoeira Grande
- Centro de Educação Desportiva de Lagos
- Clube de Futebol Montes Alvorense
- Clube de Futebol Os Bonjoanenses
- Clube Desportivo Boliqueime
- Clube Desportivo e Recreativo Santaluziense
- Clube Oriental de Pechão
- Clube Recreativo Infante de Sagres
- Clube Recreativo Praia da Salema
- Clube Recreativo Vila do Bispo
- Futebol Clube de Bias
- Futebol Clube Ferreiras (B)
- Futebol Clube Império
- Gil Eanes Juventude Portimonense Clube
- Grupo Desportivo Beira Mar
- Grupo Desportivo Beira Mar (B)
- Grupo Desportivo Cultural Salgados
- Grupo Desportivo da Atalaia
- Grupo Desportivo de Alcoutim
- Grupo Desportivo de Burgau
- Grupo Desportivo e Cultural Jograis António Aleixo
- Grupo Desportivo e Recreativo Alvorense
- Grupo Desportivo Odeceixense
- Grupo Desportivo Safol Olhanense
- Grupo Desportivo Torralta
- Guia Futebol Clube (B)
- India Futebol Clube Olhanense
- Instituto D. Francisco Gomes – Casa dos Rapazes
- Internacional Clube de Almancil
- Juventude Desportiva Monchiquense (B)
- Leões Futebol Clube Tavira
- Sociedade Recreativa Boa União Parchalense
- Sport Clube de Benafim
- Sport Lagos e Benfica
- Sport Lisboa e Faro
- Sport Lisboa e Fuzeta
- Sporting Clube Olhanense (B)
- União Desportiva e Recreativa Sambrazense (B)

== District championships ==
=== Historic champions ===
Year	Champions
1914–15	SC Farense
1917–18	SC Farense
1921–22	SC Olhanense
1922–23	Lusitano VRSA
1923–24	SC Olhanense
1924–25	SC Olhanense
1925–26	SC Olhanense
1926–27	SC Olhanense
1927–28	Lusitano VRSA
1928–29	Lusitano VRSA
1929–30	Lusitano VRSA
1930–31	SC Olhanense
1931–32	Lusitano VRSA
1932–33	SC Olhanense

Year	Champions
1933–34	SC Farense
1934–35	Lusitano VRSA
1935–36	SC Farense
1936–37	Portimonense SC
1937–38	SC Farense
1938–39	SC Olhanense
1939–40	SC Olhanense
1940–41	SC Olhanense
1941–42	SC Olhanense
1942–43	SC Olhanense
1943–44	SC Olhanense
1944–45	SC Olhanense
1945–46	SC Olhanense
1946–47	SC Olhanense

Titles

- SC Olhanense - 16
- Lusitano VRSA - 6
- SC Farense - 5
- Portimonense SC - 1

=== Recent divisional winners ===
Season	1ª Divisão	2ª Divisão	Cup	Supercup
2005–06	Campinense		Campinense	
2006–07	Quarteirense		Portimonense	
2007–08	Farense	Quarteira	Messinense	
2008–09	Esp. Lagos	Culatrense	Esp. Lagos	
2009–10	Messinense	Moncarapachense		
2010–11	Quarteirense		Silves	
2011–12	Lusitano VRSA	Aljezurense	Louletano	Quarteirense
2012–13	FC Ferreiras		Lusitano VRSA	Lusitano VRSA
2013–14	Lusitano VRSA		Louletano	FC Ferreiras
2014–15	Almancilense		Lagoa	Lusitano VRSA
2015–16	Armacenenses	Messinense	Almancilense	Armacenenses
2016–17	Moncarapachense	Algarve CF	Lusitano VRSA	Lusitano VRSA
2017–18	FC Ferreiras	11 Esperanças	Almancilense	FC Ferreiras

== List of member clubs ==
Abbreviation	Settlement	Official Name	Division (tier)	Cup	Other information
Aljezurense	Aljezur	Juventude Clube Aljezurense	Distritais (4)	None	
Almancilense	Almancil, Loulé	Sociedade Recreativa Almancilense	Distritais (4)	* *	
Alvorense	Alvor, Portimão	Associação Cultural e Recreativa Alvorense 1º Dezembro	Distritais (F)	* *	
Armacenenses	Armação de Pêra, Silves	Clube de Futebol Os Armacenenses	Distritais (F)	*	
Bensafrim	Bensafrim, Lagos	Estrela Desportiva Bensafrim	Distritais (F)	None	
Boliqueime	Boliqueime, Loulé	Clube Desportivo de Boliqueime	Distritais (F)	None	
Campinense	Campinas de Loulé	Juventude Sport Campinense	Distritais (F)	* *	
Castromarinense	Castro Marim	União Desportiva Castromarinense	Distritais (4)	*	
CRD Santaluziense	Santa Luzia, Tavira	Clube de Recreio e Desporto Santaluziense	Distritais (F)	*	
Culatrense	Ilha da Culatra, Faro	Clube União Culatrense	Distritais (5)	None	
Esp. Lagos	Lagos	Clube de Futebol Esperança de Lagos	Campeonato Nacional de Seniores (3)	* *	
Estombarenses	Estômbar, Lagoa	Clube de Futebol Os Estombarenses	Distritais (F)	None	
Farense	Faro	Sporting Clube Farense	Segunda Liga (2)	* * *	
Faro e Benfica	Faro	Sport Faro e Benfica	Distritais (4)	*	
FC 11 Esperanças	Faro	Futebol Clube 11 Esperanças	Distritais (4)	None	
FC Ferreiras	Albufeira	Futebol Clube de Ferreiras	Campeonato Nacional de Seniores (3)	*	
GEJUPCE	Portimão	Gil Eanes Juventude Portimonense Clube	Distritais (F)	None	
Guia	Albufeira	Guia Futebol Clube	Distritais (4)	*	
Imortal DC	Albufeira	Imortal Desportivo Club	Distritais (4)	* *	
Infante Sagres	Sagres	Clube Recreativo Infante de Sagres	Distritais (F)	None	
Lagoa	Lagoa	Grupo Desportivo de Lagoa	Distritais (4)	* *	
Louletano	Loulé	Louletano Desportos Clube	Campeonato Nacional de Seniores (3)	* *	
Lusitano VRSA	Vila Real de Santo António	Lusitano Futebol Clube	Distritais (4)	* *	
Machados	Machados, São Brás de Alportel	Grupo Desportivo e Cultural Machados	Distritais (F)	None	
Messinense	Silves	União Desportiva Messinense	Distritais (F)	* *	
Moncarapachense	Moncarapacho, Olhão	Lusitano Ginásio Clube Moncarapachense	Distritais (4)	*	
Monchiquense	Monchique	Juventude Desportiva Monchiquense	Distritais (6)	None	
Odeceixense	Odeceixe	Grupo Desportivo Odeceixense	Distritais (F)	None	
Odiáxere	Lagos	Clube Desportivo de Odeáxere	Distritais (4)	None	
Olhanense	Olhão	Sporting Clube Olhanense	Primeira Liga (1)	* * *	
Padernense	Paderne	Padernense Clube, Cultura, Desporto e Recreio	Distritais (4)	* *	
Portimonense	Portimão	Portimonense Sporting Clube	Liga de Honra (2)	* * *	
Quarteira	Quarteira, Loulé	Quarteira Sport Clube	Campeonato Nacional de Seniores (3)	None	
Quarteirense	Quarteira, Loulé	Clube Desportivo e Recreativo Quarteirense	Distritais (4)	* *	
Sambrazense	São Brás de Alportel	União Desportiva e Recreativa Sambrazense	Distritais (F)	* *	
Serrano	São Marcos da Serra, Silves	Serrano Futebol Clube	Distritais (F)	None	
Silves	Silves	Silves Futebol Clube	Distritais (4)	* *	
Tavira	Tavira	Ginásio Clube de Tavira	Distritais (F)	*	

Footnote

- 1–10 games in Portuguese Cup. *
- 11–100 games in Portuguese Cup. * *
- 101+ games in Portuguese Cup. * * *
