= Ivo Nicolau =

Portuguese footballer

Personal information
- Full name: Ivo Passeira Nicolau
- Date of birth: 21 March 1983 (age 43)
- Place of birth: Portimão, Portugal
- Height: 1.86 m (6 ft 1 in)
- Position: Center back

Team information
- Current team: Esperança Lagos
- Number: 4

Youth career
- 1996–2002: Portimonense

Senior career*
Years	Team	Apps	(Gls)
2002–2004	Portimonense	3	(0)
2004–2005	Marco	3	(0)
2005–2007	Tourizense	31	(1)
2007–2008	Pampilhosa	24	(0)
2008–2011	Lagoa	67	(2)
2011–2012	Louletano	25	(2)
2012–2017	Portimonense	148	(6)
2017–2018	Olhanense	23	(0)
2018–2019	Louletano	26	(0)
2019–	Esperança Lagos	11	(0)
- * Club domestic league appearances and goals as of 22 November 2019

Ivo Passeira Nicolau (born 21 March 1983), simply known as Ivo Nicolau is a Portuguese professional footballer playing for Esperança Lagos as a defender.

== Club career ==
Born in Portimão, he a long youth career with local Portimonense between 1996 and 2002. He was transferred to Marco in order to seek more first team opportunities. After a second disappointing stint, he stepped a division lower with Tourizense. In 2012, he returned to his boyhood club Portimonense in Segunda Liga.
