= Nando (footballer, born 1963) =

Portuguese footballer

Personal information
- Full name: Fernando Jorge Fígueiredo Campos
- Date of birth: 9 November 1963 (age 62)
- Place of birth: Calulo, Portuguese Angola
- Height: 1.79 m (5 ft 10 in)
- Position: Midfielder

Youth career
- –1980: Portimonense
- 1980–1983: Torralta

Senior career*
Years	Team	Apps	(Gls)
1983–1986	Torralta		
1986–1990	Rio Ave		
1990–1992	Vitória FC		
1992–1993	Penafiel		
1993–1994	Ovarense		
1994–1999	Leça		
1999–2000	Marco		
2000–2001	Vilanovense		
2000–2001	Celoricense		

International career
	Portugal U16	6	(0)
	Portugal U18	2	(0)
- * Club domestic league appearances and goals

Fernando Jorge Fígueiredo Campos, known as Nando (born 9 November 1963) is a retired Angolan-born Portuguese football midfielder.
