= Bruno González (Portuguese footballer) =

Portuguese footballer

Personal information
- Full name: Bruno Filipe dos Reis González
- Date of birth: 10 September 1986 (age 40)
- Place of birth: Lagos, Portugal
- Height: 1.71 m (5 ft 7 1/2 in)
- Position: Midfielder

Team information
- Current team: Armacenenses
- Number: 5

Youth career
- 1997–2001: Esperança de Lagos
- 2001–2007: Vitória de Setúbal

Senior career*
Years	Team	Apps	(Gls)
2007–2008	Imortal	23	(0)
2008	Ayia Napa		
2009–2012	Esperança de Lagos		
2012–2014	Portimonense	15	(0)
2014–2015	Farense	25	(0)
2015–2016	União de Leiria	8	(0)
2016–	Armacenenses	14	(0)
- * Club domestic league appearances and goals as of 2 April 2017

Bruno Filipe dos Reis González (born 10 September 1986) is a Portuguese football player who plays for Armacenenses.

== Club career ==
He made his professional debut in the Segunda Liga for Portimonense on 19 January 2013 in a game against Trofense.
