= Vado (footballer) =

Portuguese footballer

Personal information
- Full name: Osvaldo Couto Cardoso Pinto
- Date of birth: 5 March 1969 (age 57)
- Place of birth: Malanje, Angola
- Height: 1.67 m (5 ft 5 1/2 in)
- Position: Midfielder

Youth career
- 1981–1987: Torralta

Senior career*
| Years | Team | Apps | (Gls) |
| 1987–1988 | Torralta | | |
| 1988–1991 | Portimonense | 90 | (7) |
| 1991–1995 | Marítimo | 122 | (6) |
| 1995–1996 | Braga | 19 | (0) |
| 1996–1998 | Desportivo Beja | 63 | (3) |
| 1998–2001 | Portimonense | 81 | (7) |
| 2001–2002 | Operário | 25 | (1) |
| 2002–2005 | Silves | | |
| 2005–2006 | Monchiquense | | |
| Total | | 400 | (24) |

International career
| 1989–1995 | Portugal | 3 | (0) |
- * Club domestic league appearances and goals

Osvaldo Couto Cardoso Pinto (born 5 March 1969 in Malanje, Portuguese Angola), commonly known as Vado, is a Portuguese former footballer who played as a central midfielder.
