= Elvis Mendes =

Cape Verdean footballer (born 1997)

Personal information
- Full name: Edmilson Jesus Moreira Mendes
- Date of birth: 8 May 1997 (age 29)
- Place of birth: Mindelo, Cape Verde
- Height: 1.78 m (5 ft 10 in)
- Position: Left-back

Team information
- Current team: Louletano
- Number: 50

Youth career
- 2013–2014: Catujalense
- 2014–2015: Povoense

Senior career*
Years	Team	Apps	(Gls)
2015	Povoense	2	(0)
2015–2016	Loures	0	(0)
2016–2017	CD Gouveia	27	(0)
2017–2019	Armacenenses	58	(1)
2019–2021	Louletano	21	(0)
2021–2022	Benfica e Castelo Branco	23	(0)
2022–2023	Louletano	32	(2)
2023–2024	Oliveira do Hospital	14	(0)
2024–2025	Académica	21	(0)
2025–	Louletano	0	(0)

International career^{‡}
2018–	Cape Verde	1	(0)
- * Club domestic league appearances and goals as of 14 September 2025 ‡ National team caps and goals as of 21:46, 17 October 2019 (UTC)

Edmilson Jesus Moreira Mendes (born 8 May 1997), better known as Elvis Mendes, is a Cape Verdean professional footballer who plays as a left-back for Portuguese Liga 3 club Louletano.

== International career ==
Mendes was called up to represent the Cape Verde national team in May 2018 for two international friendlies. He made his debut in a 0–0 (4–3) penalty shootout win over Andorra on 3 June 2018.
