= Estádio do G.D. Peniche =

Soccer stadium in Peniche, Portugal

Estádio do G. D. Peniche
- Interactive map of Estádio do G. D. Peniche
- Full name: Estádio do Grupo Desportivo de Peniche
- Address: Rua dos Pocinhos, Estádio Grupo Desportivo de Peniche, 2520-206
- Location: Peniche, Portugal
- Coordinates: 39.35204116803399°N 9.362631440162659°W
- Owner: G. D. Peniche
- Operator: GD Peniche
- Capacity: 6,000
- Surface: Grass
- Scoreboard: Yes
- Field size: 104 x 66 m

Construction
- Opened: 1992

Tenant
- G. D. Peniche (1992–present))

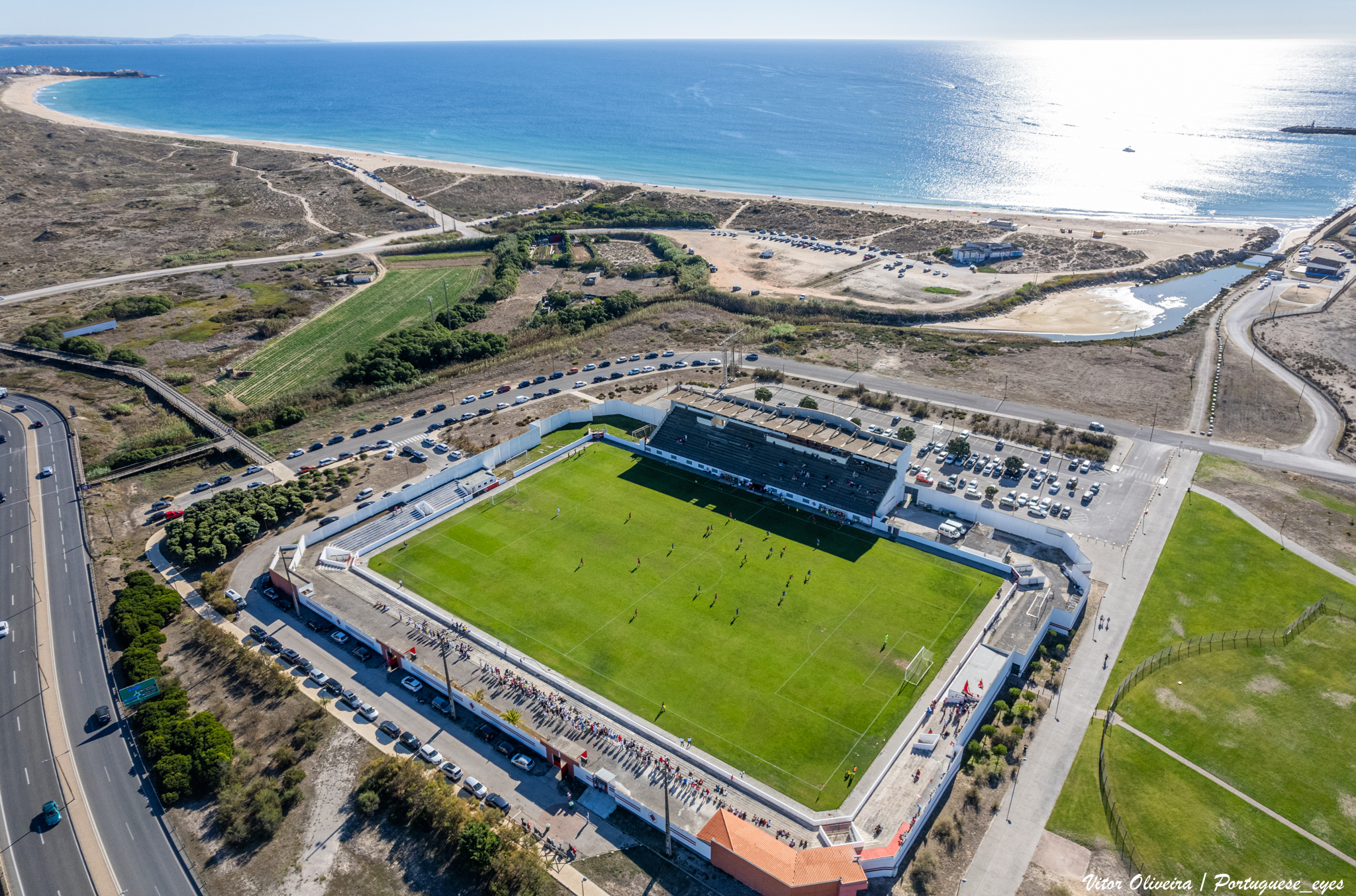
Estádio Municipal de Peniche in 2024

The Estádio do G.D. Peniche, officially named Estádio do Grupo Desportivo de Peniche is a Soccer-specific stadium located in Peniche, Portugal. The stadium hosts home games for G. D. Peniche and for Leiria Football Association tournament games.
