= Rodrigo Vilela =

Portuguese footballer

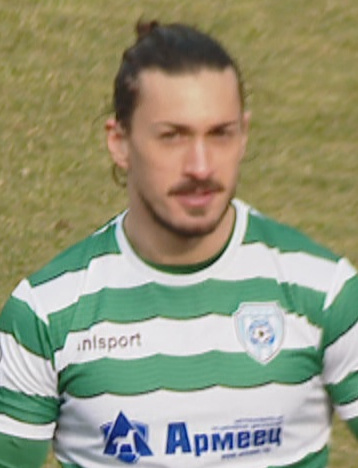

Personal information
- Full name: Rodrigo Abreu de Sá Vilela
- Date of birth: 15 March 1995 (age 31)
- Place of birth: Lisbon, Portugal
- Height: 1.74 m (5 ft 8 1/2 in)
- Position: Winger

Team information
- Current team: Louletano

Youth career
- 2004–2014: Louletano

Senior career*
Years	Team	Apps	(Gls)
2012–2018	Louletano	93	(4)
2018–2019	Académica B	29	(14)
2018–2019	Académica	1	(0)
2019–2020	Torreense	20	(2)
2020–2022	Cherno More	32	(0)
2023–2025	1. SC Znojmo	36	(10)
2025–	Louletano	11	(1)
- * Club domestic league appearances and goals as of 20 February 2026

Rodrigo Abreu de Sá Vilela (born 15 March 1995) is a Portuguese professional footballer who plays as a winger for Louletano.

== Club career ==
An academy graduate of Louletano, Vilela made his senior debut for the club at the age of 17 in December 2012.

In June 2018, Vilela joined Académica de Coimbra. He made his LigaPro debut on 19 May 2019 in a game against Varzim.

In September 2020, Vilela signed a contract with Bulgarian club Cherno More Varna. In May 2022, he left the team by mutual consent.
