= João Paulo (footballer, born 1978) =

Portuguese footballer

Personal information
- Full name: João Paulo da Silva Gouveia Morais
- Date of birth: 31 August 1978 (age 48)
- Place of birth: Setúbal, Portugal
- Height: 1.94 m (6 ft 4 1/2 in)
- Position: Goalkeeper

Youth career
- 1986–1987: Comércio Indústria
- 1987–1988: Vitória Setúbal
- 1988–1991: Comércio Indústria
- 1991–1992: Palmelense

Senior career*
Years	Team	Apps	(Gls)
1992–1994	O Grandolense		
1994–1995	Cova Piedade		
1995–1996	Alcacerense		
1996–1998	União Montemor	18	(0)
1998–1999	Imortal	11	(0)
1999–2000	União Montemor		
2000	Braga B	11	(0)
2000–2002	Atlético	38	(0)
2002–2003	Seixal	30	(0)
2003–2004	Oliveira Hospital	46	(0)
2005	Beira-Mar Monte Gordo		
2005–2006	Madalena	26	(0)
2006–2007	Vitória Setúbal	5	(0)
2007	Foolad		
2008	Vizela	0	(0)
- * Club domestic league appearances and goals

João Paulo da Silva Gouveia Morais (born 31 August 1978 in Setúbal), known as João Paulo, is a Portuguese retired footballer who played as a goalkeeper.
