= Chiquinho (footballer, born 1980) =

Portuguese footballer

Personal information
- Full name: Francisco da Cruz Delgado
- Date of birth: 28 September 1980 (age 46)
- Place of birth: Lisbon, Portugal
- Height: 1.84 m (6 ft 0 in)
- Position: Forward

Youth career
- 1991–1994: Belenenses
- 1994–1997: Alcobaça
- 1997–1999: União Leiria

Senior career*
Years	Team	Apps	(Gls)
1999	União Leiria	5	(0)
2000	Naval	11	(2)
2000–2004	Sporting CP B	65	(27)
2001–2005	Sporting CP	3	(0)
2001–2002	→ Campomaiorense (loan)	9	(1)
2002–2003	→ Imortal (loan)	40	(9)
2004–2005	→ Chaves (loan)	28	(4)
2005–2006	Marco	12	(0)
2006–2010	Skoda Xanthi	31	(0)
2008–2009	→ Panetolikos (loan)	26	(8)
2009–2010	→ Thrasyvoulos (loan)	25	(3)
2010–2011	Thrasyvoulos	6	(0)
Total		261	(54)
- * Club domestic league appearances and goals

Francisco da Cruz Delgado (born 28 September 1980 in Lisbon), commonly known as Chiquinho, is a Portuguese former professional footballer who played as a forward.
