= 1990–91 Segunda Divisão B =

Segunda Divisão
- Season: 1990–91
- Champions: AD Ovarense
- Promoted: AD Ovarense; Rio Ave FC; SC Farense
- Relegated: 22 teams

The 1990–91 Segunda Divisão season was the 57th season of the competition and the 44th season of recognised third-tier football in Portugal.

== Overview ==
The league was contested by 60 teams in 3 divisions with AD Ovarense, Rio Ave FC and SC Olhanense winning the respective divisional competitions and gaining promotion to the Liga de Honra. The overall championship was won by AD Ovarense.

== League standings ==
=== Segunda Divisão - Zona Norte ===
Pos	Team	Pld	W	D	L	GF	GA	GD	Pts	Promotion or relegation
1	Rio Ave FC	38	23	10	5	79	21	+58	56	Promotion to Championship play-off
2	AD Fafe	38	23	8	7	66	29	+37	54	
3	FC Marco	38	18	10	10	48	46	+2	46	
4	Infesta FC	38	18	7	13	68	54	+14	43	
5	Moreirense FC	38	14	14	10	66	49	+17	42	
6	SC Vila Real	38	17	8	13	52	39	+13	42	
7	GD Joane	38	16	10	12	49	37	+12	42	
8	União Lamas	38	16	10	12	61	57	+4	42	
9	FC Felgueiras	38	18	5	15	54	41	+13	41	
10	FC Vizela	38	17	7	14	59	49	+10	41	
11	AD Lousada	38	17	7	14	54	49	+5	41	
12	União Paredes	38	15	10	13	60	56	+4	40	
13	AD Esposende	38	14	11	13	46	49	−3	39	
14	Amarante FC	38	15	8	15	51	50	+1	38	Relegation to Terceira Divisão
15	CD Trofense	38	13	12	13	45	46	−1	38	Relegation to Terceira Divisão
16	GD Bragança	38	11	7	20	40	61	−21	29	Relegation to Terceira Divisão
17	Leça FC	38	8	12	18	45	55	−10	28	Relegation to Terceira Divisão
18	SC Mirandela	38	5	11	22	21	68	−47	21	Relegation to Terceira Divisão
19	CRP Delães	38	7	6	25	35	90	−55	20	Relegation to Terceira Divisão
20	AD Valpaços	38	6	5	27	40	93	−53	17	Relegation to Terceira Divisão

=== Segunda Divisão - Zona Centro ===
Pos	Team	Pld	W	D	L	GF	GA	GD	Pts	Promotion or relegation
1	AD Ovarense	38	26	7	5	80	24	+56	59	Promotion to Championship play-off
2	CD Lousanense	38	20	10	8	50	23	+27	50	
3	Caldas SC	38	21	6	11	51	30	+21	48	
4	AD Sanjoanense	38	18	11	9	57	30	+27	47	
5	CA Mirandense	38	15	16	7	36	21	+15	46	
6	UD Oliveirense	38	19	7	12	52	32	+20	45	
7	União Mirense	38	15	14	9	60	47	+13	44	
8	Oliveira do Hospital	38	14	14	10	47	44	+3	42	
9	SC Covilhã	38	14	11	13	42	38	+4	39	
10	União Santarém	38	15	8	15	44	41	+3	38	
11	Naval 1º Maio	38	13	12	13	40	47	−7	38	
12	UFCI Tomar	38	13	11	14	38	37	+1	37	
13	CD Estarreja	38	12	12	14	49	51	−2	36	Relegation to Terceira Divisão
14	GD Santacombadense	38	11	11	16	32	39	−7	33	Relegation to Terceira Divisão
15	Os Marialvas	38	10	12	16	39	49	−10	32	Relegation to Terceira Divisão
16	União Coimbra	38	11	6	21	36	61	−25	28	Relegation to Terceira Divisão
17	GD Mangualde	38	10	7	21	25	50	−25	27	Relegation to Terceira Divisão
18	Anadia FC	38	7	13	18	38	58	−20	27	Relegation to Terceira Divisão
19	GC Alcobaça	38	7	11	20	25	63	−38	25	Relegation to Terceira Divisão
20	AD Guarda	38	7	5	26	35	91	−56	19	Relegation to Terceira Divisão

=== Segunda Divisão - Zona Sul ===
Pos	Team	Pld	W	D	L	GF	GA	GD	Pts	Promotion or relegation
1	SC Olhanense	38	18	13	7	58	34	+24	49	Promotion to Championship play-off
2	SC Campomaiorense	38	21	6	11	53	37	+16	48	
3	SG Sacavenense	38	16	14	8	54	34	+20	46	
4	Lusitano Évora	38	18	10	10	47	36	+11	46	
5	Atlético CP	38	17	11	10	41	34	+7	45	
6	Amora FC	38	12	19	7	52	33	+19	43	
7	CDR Quarteirense	38	16	11	11	42	37	+5	43	
8	CD Montijo	38	16	10	12	47	32	+15	42	
9	FC Alverca	38	16	7	15	54	38	+16	39	
10	Silves FC	38	12	15	11	39	32	+7	39	
11	Esperança Lagos	38	13	12	13	38	38	0	38	
12	União Santiago	38	13	12	13	46	46	0	38	
13	Juventude Évora	38	11	14	13	47	46	+1	36	
14	CD Santa Clara	38	12	9	17	40	56	−16	33	Relegation to Terceira Divisão
15	Oriental Lisboa	38	12	9	17	40	51	−11	33	Relegation to Terceira Divisão
16	SU Sintrense	38	11	9	18	45	64	−19	31	Relegation to Terceira Divisão
17	Seixal FC	38	10	11	17	34	46	−12	31	Relegation to Terceira Divisão
18	União Almeirim	38	9	11	18	39	71	−32	29	Relegation to Terceira Divisão
19	CD Olivais e Moscavide	38	8	10	20	37	65	−28	26	Relegation to Terceira Divisão
20	GS Loures	38	7	11	20	34	57	−23	25	Relegation to Terceira Divisão

== Championship play-off ==
Pos	Team	Pld	W	D	L	GF	GA	GD	Pts	Promotion
1	Ovarense (C)	4	3	0	1	10	4	+6	6	Promotion to Segunda Divisão de Honra
2	Rio Ave	4	2	1	1	9	7	+2	5	Promotion to Segunda Divisão de Honra
3	Olhanense	4	0	1	3	6	14	−8	1	Promotion to Segunda Divisão de Honra

(C) Champions
