= Eldon Maquemba =

Angolan footballer

Maquemba
Personal information
- Full name: Eldon Martins Maquemba
- Date of birth: 8 June 1984 (age 42)
- Place of birth: Benguela, Angola
- Height: 1.78 m (5 ft 10 in)
- Positions: Striker; winger

Youth career
- 1999–2003: Oriental Lisboa

Senior career*
Years	Team	Apps	(Gls)
2004–2005	Oriental Lisboa	24	(8)
2005–2006	Olivais e Moscavide	8	(0)
2005–2006	→ Portomosense (loan)	15	(11)
2006–2007	Imortal	12	(7)
2007	Boden	13	(6)
2007–2008	Halesowen Town	26	(14)
2008–2009	Olympiakos Nicosia	9	(4)
2009	Caála	13	(7)
2010–2011	Đồng Tâm Long An	30	(13)
2012–2013	Progresso do Sambizanga	13	(4)
2014	UiTM	11	(5)
2015	FK Kruoja	7	(2)
2016–2017	Syrianska FC	9	(5)

International career
2005–2007	Angola	6	(0)
- * Club domestic league appearances and goals

Eldon Martins Maquemba, known as Maquemba (born 8 June 1984), is an Angolan professional footballer who played as a striker and as a winger. He also holds Portuguese citizenship.

== Career ==
Maquemba was born in Benguela, Angola. He started his senior career with Clube Oriental de Lisboa, in the Portuguese Second Division. and played also in the same league with teams Clube Desportivo dos Olivais e Moscavide, A.D. Portomosense, Imortal Desportivo Clube.

In 2007, Maquemba signed with Swedish team Bodens BK. A year later, he moved to England to play for Halesowen Town F.C. For the 2008–09 season, he signed with Olympiakos Nicosia in Cyprus and was sold in January 2009 to Clube Recreativo da Caála in Angola. In January 2010, he was close to signing a two-year deal with Peñarol of Uruguay but signed with Vietnamese club Đồng Tâm Long An F.C. In 2010, Maquemba was winner of BTV Cup with Đồng Tâm Long An, after a win against Matsubara from Brasil.

In 2012 Maquemba moved to Angola, signing a two-year deal with Progresso Associação do Sambizanga in the Girabola.

In 2016, Maquemba joined Swedish club Syrianska FC.

== International career ==
In November 2004, Maquemba was part of Angola's 29-man provisional squad for the COSAFA Cup final.

== Honours ==
Đồng Tâm Long An

- BTV Cup: 2010

Angola

- COSAFA Cup: 2004
