= Paulo Rocha (footballer, born 1954) =

Portuguese footballer

Personal information
- Full name: Paulo José Rocha Baldroegas
- Date of birth: 2 December 1954 (age 71)
- Place of birth: Barreiro, Portugal
- Position: Midfielder

Youth career
- 1969–1973: Luso Barreiro

Senior career*
Years	Team	Apps	(Gls)
1973–1976	Sporting CP	28	(0)
1976–1981	Braga	116	(14)
1981–1983	Portimonense	54	(4)
1983–1986	Chaves		
1986–1988	Trofense		
1988–1989	Silves		
1989–1990	Alvorense		

International career
1982	Portugal	1	(0)
- * Club domestic league appearances and goals

Paulo José Rocha Baldroegas (born 2 December 1954), known as Rocha, is a Portuguese retired footballer who played as a midfielder.
