= João Duarte (footballer) =

Portuguese footballer

Personal information
- Full name: João Miguel Cândido Duarte
- Date of birth: 21 May 1993 (age 33)
- Place of birth: Portimão, Portugal
- Height: 1.71 m (5 ft 7 1/2 in)
- Position: Right back

Youth career
- 2001–2003: Futsal
- 2003: GEJUPCE
- 2003–2006: Portimonense
- 2006–2007: Benfica
- 2007: Portimonense
- 2008–2010: Benfica
- 2010–2012: Portimonense

Senior career*
Years	Team	Apps	(Gls)
2012–2014	Portimonense	3	(0)
2013–2014	→ Esperança Lagos (loan)	25	(1)
2014–2016	Futsal		
2016	Armacenenses	3	(1)
- * Club domestic league appearances and goals as of 24 September 2016

João Miguel Cândido Duarte (born 21 May 1993) is a Portuguese footballer who plays as a defender.
