= G.D.R. Monsanto =

Portuguese football club

- Full name: Grupo Desportivo e Recreativo de Monsanto
- Founded: 1976
- Ground: Campo do Pião; Monsanto
- Capacity: 1000
- Chairman: Rui Henriques
- Manager: Victor Alves
- League: Terceira Divisão Series D (IV)
- 2010/11: 1st
Home colours	Away colours

G.D.R. Monsanto is a Portuguese football club based in the village of Monsanto in the municipality of Idanha-a-Nova in east Portugal. They currently play in one of eight regional leagues in the Terceira Divisão in the fourth tier of Portuguese football.

== History ==
G.D.R. Monsanto has existed informally for most of the 20th century, but was formally constituted in 1976 as part of a sports club that also competes in cycling and chess. In recent years, the team played in the Santarém District Leagues before reaching promotion to the Terceira Divisão in 2004 and subsequently the Segunda Divisão in 2008.

The club was relegated to the Third Division for the 2010–11 season, where it won the Série D league, and returned to compete in the Second Division in 2011–12.

Each season, the team competes in the Portuguese Cup.

== Stadium ==
G.D.R. Monsanto play their home matches in Campo do Pião, Monsanto. The stadium's capacity is 1000.

== Current squad ==
As of 20 June 2011. Note: Flags indicate national team as defined under FIFA eligibility rules; some limited exceptions apply. Players may hold more than one non-FIFA nationality.

No.	Pos.	Nation	Player
—	GK	POR	Nuno Martins
—	GK	SEN	René
—	DF	BRA	Marçal
—	DF	BRA	Ito
—	DF	BRA	Roberto
—	DF	POR	Daniel Evangelista
—	DF	POR	Filípe
—	DF	SEN	Babacar
—	MF	POR	João Martins

No.	Pos.	Nation	Player
—	MF	POR	Bruno Matos
—	MF	POR	Ruas
—	MF	BRA	Bruno
—	FW	BRA	Alex (I)
—	FW	BRA	Jamerson
—	FW	POR	Figa
—	FW	POR	Júlio
—	FW	BRA	Alex (II)

== Achievements ==
- Terceira Divisão Serie D:
  - Winners (2): 2007–08, 2010–11
- Santarém District League First Division (fifth tier league):
  - Winners (1): 2003–04
- Santarém District League Second Division (sixth tier league):
  - Winners (1): 2000–01

== See also ==
- Portuguese football league system
- Football in Portugal
