= C.D. Portalegrense =

Portuguese association football club

Portalegrense
- Full name: Club Desportivo Portalegrense
- Short name: C.D. Portalegrense
- Founded: 26 July 1925; 101 years ago
- Ground: Estádio Municipal de Portalegre
- League: Portalegre Football Association
- 2025–26: AF Portalegre Senior Championship, 3rd
- Website: cdportalegrense.pt

Club Desportivo Portalegrense (Portuguese pronunciation: [ˈkluβɨ dɨʃpɔɾtɐlɨˈɡɾẽsɨ]), commonly known as C.D. Portalegrense or simply Portalegrense, is a Portuguese football club based in Portalegre, Portalegre District, in the Alentejo region. Founded on 26 July 1925, the club competes in the regional competitions organised by the Portalegre Football Association.

Founded originally as Grupo Desportivo Portalegrense, the club has a long history in Portuguese regional and national football. It reached the Segunda Divisão and won the Terceira Divisão twice, in the 1975–76 and 1987–88 seasons. Portalegrense has also participated in district competitions organised by the Portalegre Football Association and maintained activities in several other sports, alongside a long-standing emphasis on youth development.

In 2024, the club established Desportivo Portalegrense SAD, a project associated with the integration of the former B-SAD structure, with the aim of restoring senior football to the club. During the 2025–26 season, Portalegrense finished third in the Portalegre district senior championship and reached the final of the Taça Comendador António Costa. The club continues to field youth teams and senior sides in regional competitions.

== Honours ==
- Terceira Divisão
  - Winners (2): 1975–76, 1987–88
