= João Ferreira Duarte =

Portuguese writer and professor

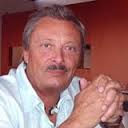
João Ferreira Duarte

João Ferreira Duarte (born 1947 in Lisbon, Portugal) is a retired full professor of English and Comparative Literature at the School of Arts and Humanities of the University of Lisbon (FLUL). He is also a research fellow at the Centre for Comparative Studies of the same university.

== Biography ==
João Ferreira Duarte graduated in Germanic Philology from the School of Arts and Humanities of the University of Lisbon in 1971. In the same year he was offered a position as teaching assistant at this institution. In 1986 he completed his PhD in English Literature with a thesis on W. H. Auden. He has taught Literary Theory, English Literature, Comparative Literature, African Post-colonial Literature, and Translation Studies. Ferreira Duarte was founding member of the Portuguese Association for Anglo-American Studies (APEAA), which was created in 1979, as well as the Centre for Comparative Studies, of which he is a member since 1998. Between 1991 and 2010, he directed the post-graduate programme in Comparative Studies, initially under the name of Comparative Literature, offered at the same School of Arts and Humanities. He was also President of the Portuguese Association for Comparative Literature between 2002 and 2007.

== Ferreira Duarte and Translation Studies in Portugal ==
He has played a decisive role in the institutionalization of Translation Studies in the Portuguese academia. In 1989, following the growth of Comparative Studies in Portugal, he set up the first interdepartmental course on Translation Studies at the University of Lisbon, as part of the newly created MA in Comparative Literature. In 2001 he created TradBase, an online database which collects Translation Studies works published both in Portugal and by Portuguese scholars. The aim of this online bibliography was to promote the dialogue between scholars working on translation; in Ferreira Duarte's words: "I wanted to contribute to the construction of a kind of 'scientific community', that is, to help to foster among those who were working on translation a sense of taking part in a collective project which was both national and international". In 2004, the fourth EST (European Society for Translation Studies) congress was held in Lisbon under the guidance and impulse of Ferreira Duarte, among other scholars.

== Research and critical legacy ==
Ferreira Duarte has conceptualized the phenomenon of non-translation as a zone of silence applied to both textual and cultural transfers, particularly as the result of institutionalized censorship or ideological embargo, and has problematized the binary discourse that has historically supported reflection on translation. He has also brought forward the concept of carnivalized translation, a particular translation type which, similarly to parody, uncrowns the sacred status of the original. More recently, he has been interested in both the metaphorical uses of the concept of translation across disciplinary fields and the concept of cultural translation through which he shares Gideon Toury's view of translation as a culturally ingrained fact and sees untranslatability as non-translation and thus as a form of translation in itself. His A Cultura entre tradução e etnografia [Culture between translation and ethnography] (2008) is a textbook in Portuguese language that testifies the encounter between Ethnography, Cultural Studies, and Translation Studies by gathering key essays to the understanding of the complexity of the concept and paradigm of cultural translation.

== Works (selection) ==
Ferreira Duarte has published widely, especially articles in national and international journals, such as The European Journal of English Studies, Norwich Papers: Studies in Literary Translation, Perspectives: Studies in Translatology, or TTR – Traduction, terminologie, rédaction. In addition to his scholarly work, he was active between the 1970s and the 1990s as a translator into Portuguese of both fiction and non-fiction, particularly of essays and interviews to renowned scholars (e.g. Jacques Derrida).

Books in Portuguese

- (2006). A Lição do cânone: uma auto-reflexão dos estudos literários. Lisbon: Colibri/CEAUL.
- (1989). O Espelho diabólico: construção do objecto da teoria literária. Lisbon: Caminho.
- (1986). A Quarta casa: onde se fala de Aristóteles, da paródia, do riso e da teoria do romance de Henry Fielding. Lisbon: Apáginastantas.

Edited books

- (2011). (with Manuela Ribeiro Sanches; Fernando Clara; Leonor Pires Martins) Europe in Black and White. Immigration, Race, and Identity in the ‘Old Continent’. Chicago: The University of Chicago Press.
- (2010). (with Susana Araújo; Marta Pacheco Pinto) Trans/American, Trans/Oceanic, Trans/lation: Issues in International American Studies . Newcastle: Cambridge Scholars Publishing.
- (2008). A Cultura entre tradução e etnografia, Sara Ramos Pinto (trans), Lisbon: Vega.
- (2006). (with Alexandra Assis Rosa and Teresa Seruya) Translation Studies at the Interface of Disciplines. Amsterdam & Philadelphia: John Benjamins Publishing Company.
- (2001). A Tradução nas encruzilhadas da cultura/Translation as/at the Crossroads of Culture/La Traduction aux carrefours de la culture. Lisbon: Colibri.
- (2001). (with Helena C. Buescu; Manuel Gusmão) Floresta encantada: novos caminhos da literatura comparada. Lisbon: Dom Quixote.
- (2000). (with Helena C. Buescu) ACT 1. Sublime, tradução. Lisbon: Colibri/Centro de estudos Comparatistas.

Edited journals

- (2011). (with Isabel Capeloa Gil) Journal of Romance Studies. Fluid Cartographies – New Modernities 11(1).
- (1999). (guest ed) The European Journal of English Studies – Reconceptions of Genre 3(1).

Translations into Portuguese

- (1994). Mongane Wally Serote, Expresso do terceiro mundo. Lisbon: Caminho.
- (1993). (sel, pref and trans) Leituras: poemas do inglês (poesia contemporânea de expressão inglesa). Lisbon: Relógio d’Água.
- (1987). (trans, int and notes in collaboration with Valdemar Ferreira) Christopher Marlowe, A História trágica da vida e morte do Doutor Fausto. Lisbon: Inquérito.
- (1985). (org, trans and notes in collaboration with Alcinda de Sousa) Poética romântica inglesa. Lisbon: Apáginastantas.
- (1979). (trans, int and notes) William Blake, A União do céu e do inferno. Lisbon: Via Editora (1991, second edition reviewed, 2010 third edition, Lisbon: Relógio d’Água).
- (1976). (sel, trans, int and notes) António Gramsci, Sobre democracia operária e outros textos. Lisbon: Ulmeiro.
