= U.R. Mirense =

Portuguese sports club

- Full name: União Recreativa Mirense
- Founded: 1939
- League: Honra da AF Leiria
- 2020–21: 10th

União Recreativa Mirense, also called União Mirense is a Portuguese sports club from Mira de Aire.

The men's football team plays in the Honra da AF Leiria league. The team played in the Segunda Divisão, but from 1990 the Segunda Divisão B, the third tier of Portuguese football. Following relegation to the 1993–94 Terceira Divisão they were instantly relegated, but returned to this fourth tier from 2000 to 2004.
