= GD Samora Correia =

Portuguese sports club

- Full name: Grupo Desportivo Samora Correia
- Founded: 1975
- Ground: Complexo Desportivo da Murteira
- League: Honra AF Santarém
- 2024/25: 2nd

Grupo Desportivo Samora Correia is a Portuguese sports club from Samora Correia, Benavente.

The men's football team plays in the Honra AF Santarém. The team spent one season in the 1989–90 Segunda Divisão, but ended last. The subsequent stints in the Terceira Divisão lasted from 1990 to 1993 and 1994 to 2002. The team also contested the 2001–02 Taça de Portugal.
