= C.F. Esperança de Lagos =

Portuguese football club

CF Esperança de Lagos
- Full name: Clube de Futebol Esperança de Lagos
- Founded: 1912
- Ground: Municipal de Lagos; Lagos; Portugal
- Capacity: 4,600
- League: Campeonato de Portugal, Serie D
- 2021–22: 2nd, Serie L relegation group
Home colours

Clube de Futebol Esperança de Lagos (abbreviated as CF Esperança de Lagos or CF Esperança Lagos), usually referred to as Esperança de Lagos, is a Portuguese football club based in Lagos in the Algarve. CF Esperança de Lagos currently plays in the Campeonato de Portugal, which is the fourth tier of Portuguese football and they play their home matches at the Municipal de Lagos in Lagos. The club is affiliated to Associação de Futebol do Algarve and has competed in the AF Algarve Taça. It has also entered the national cup competition known as Taça de Portugal on many occasions.

== History ==
The club was founded in 1912 as Esperança F.C. and became the delegation number 2 of Sporting Clube de Portugal (Sporting CP). This formal link with the Lisbon-based sports club was eventually terminated by the board of Esperança de Lagos in the post-war era.

As a child, Eric Dier spent a year living in Lagos where he briefly played in the youth football team of Esperança de Lagos before moving to Lisbon and joining the Sporting CP Youth Academy.

== Current squad ==
Note: Flags indicate national team as defined under FIFA eligibility rules; some limited exceptions apply. Players may hold more than one non-FIFA nationality.

No.	Pos.	Nation	Player
1	GK	POR	Luís Pedrosa
4	DF	POR	Ivo Nicolau
—	DF	BRA	Leo Carioca
6	DF	POR	Tiago Coelho
21	DF	POR	João Duarte
6	MF	POR	Bruno González
9	CF	SEN	Kuiaté Lamine

No.	Pos.	Nation	Player
3	CF	BRA	Yaggo Gomes
—	RB	POR	Rodrigo Macedo
—	LM	CAN	Cole Van Reenen
—	RM	POR	Gerson Cassamá
—	DM	POR	Harruna Iddriss
27	CAM	POR	Wilson Marques
—	RW	GHA	Henry Medarious
—	MF	POR	Pedro Simões

== Season to season ==
Season	Level	Division	Section	Place	Movements
1990–91	Tier 3	Segunda Divisão	Série Sul	11th	
1991–92	Tier 3	Segunda Divisão	Série Sul	12th	
1992–93	Tier 3	Segunda Divisão	Série Sul	14th	
1993–94	Tier 3	Segunda Divisão	Série Sul	18th	Relegated
1994–95	Tier 4	Terceira Divisão	Série F	7th	
1995–96	Tier 4	Terceira Divisão	Série F	4th	
1996–97	Tier 4	Terceira Divisão	Série F	6th	
1997–98	Tier 4	Terceira Divisão	Série F	8th	
1998–99	Tier 4	Terceira Divisão	Série F	9th	
1999–2000	Tier 4	Terceira Divisão	Série F	15th	
2000–01	Tier 4	Terceira Divisão	Série F	6th	
2001–02	Tier 4	Terceira Divisão	Série F	10th	
2002–03	Tier 4	Terceira Divisão	Série F	11th	
2003–04	Tier 4	Terceira Divisão	Série F	18th	Relegated
2004–05	Tier 5	Distritais	AF Algarve – 1ª Divisão	7th	
2005–06	Tier 5	Distritais	AF Algarve – 1ª Divisão	4th	
2006–07	Tier 5	Distritais	AF Algarve – 1ª Divisão	8th	
2007–08	Tier 5	Distritais	AF Algarve – 1ª Divisão	5th	
2008–09	Tier 5	Distritais	AF Algarve – 1ª Divisão	1st	Promoted
2009–10	Tier 4	Terceira Divisão	Série C – 1ª Fase	5th	Promotion Group
	Tier 4	Terceira Divisão	Série F Fase Final	5th	
2010–11	Tier 4	Terceira Divisão	Série C – 1ª Fase	4th	Promotion Group
	Tier 4	Terceira Divisão	Série F Fase Final	4th	
2011–12	Tier 4	Terceira Divisão	Série C – 1ª Fase	3rd	Promotion Group
	Tier 4	Terceira Divisão	Série F Fase Final	3rd	

== Honours ==
- Terceira Divisão: 1982–83
- AF Algarve 1ª Divisão: 2008–09

== Notable former managers ==
- (Portugal) Fernando Cabrita
