= G.D. Torralta =

Portuguese football club

GD Torralta
- Full name: Grupo Desportivo Torralta
- Founded: 1934
- Dissolved: 1988
- Ground: Estádio Dois Irmãos; Portimão; Portugal
- Capacity: 2,500

Grupo Desportivo Torralta (abbreviated as GD Torralta) was a Portuguese football club based in Portimão situated in the Algarve.

== Background ==
GD Torralta folded at the end of the 1987/1988 season when they finished third in Terceira Divisão Série F which was the third tier of Portuguese football at that time. The club was founded in 1934 and they played their home matches at the Estádio Dois Irmãos in Portimão.

The club was affiliated to Associação de Futebol do Algarve and also entered the Taça de Portugal completing 13 matches in the competition.

== Season to season ==
Season	Level	Division	Section	Place	Movements
1982–83	Tier 4	Distritais	AF Algarve – 1ª Divisão		Promoted
1983–84	Tier 3	Terceira Divisão	Série F	1st	Promoted
1984–85	Tier 2	Segunda Divisão	Série Sul	9th	
1985–86	Tier 2	Segunda Divisão	Série Sul	13th	Relegated
1986–87	Tier 3	Terceira Divisão	Série F	4th	
1987–88	Tier 3	Terceira Divisão	Série F	3rd	Club folded

== Honours ==
- Terceira Divisão: 1983–84 (Série F Winners)
