= G.D. Peniche =

Portuguese football club

G. D. Peniche
- Full name: Grupo Desportivo de Peniche
- Founded: 1941
- Stadium: Estádio do G.D. Peniche
- Capacity: 6,000
- Chairman: Paulo Ferreira
- Manager: Tiago Vicente
- League: Campeonato de Portugal
- 2022–23: 1st (Promoted)
Home colours	Away colours

Grupo Desportivo de Peniche is a Portuguese football club located in Peniche, Portugal. The club was founded on 30 January 1941, and currently plays in the Campeonato de Portugal (Serie C), holding home matches at Estádio do G.D. Peniche.

== History ==
After the merger of three small clubs, Dr. Ernesto Moreira, Francisco Salvador, José Miguel de Sousa and a few other men from the Peniche municipality founded the club on 30 January 1941.

The club first started on the Portuguese Second Division and never reached the Primeira Liga as their best result was 2nd place on their respective zone, on the seasons of 1963–64, 1967–68 and 1971–72 but never made it through the playoffs.

They are filiated with AF Leiria, the districtal football association and C.F. Os Belenenses as number 14.

== Current squad ==
As of 30 September 2019

Note: Flags indicate national team as defined under FIFA eligibility rules; some limited exceptions apply. Players may hold more than one non-FIFA nationality.

No.	Pos.	Nation	Player
1	GK	POR	André Mata
3	DF	POR	Migas
4	DF	POR	Rui Pinto
5	DF	POR	Leandro Novo
7	FW	POR	Tiago Ferreira
9	FW	POR	Rodolfo Soares
10	MF	POR	Motinha
11	MF	BRA	Valdir Júnior
12	GK	POR	Diogo Soares
14	MF	POR	Luís Pinto

No.	Pos.	Nation	Player
17	FW	POR	Paulinho
18	MF	POR	Hugo Duarte
19	MF	POR	Paulo Franco
22	MF	GNB	Wlbonh Bissula
23	DF	POR	Paulo Brites
28	MF	POR	João Ferreira
77	MF	POR	Pedro Ruivo
89	DF	POR	Danny Rafael
90	FW	POR	Miguel Silva
95	FW	POR	João Carvalho

== Managers ==
- (Portugal) Paulo Torres (2003 – 2004)

== Honours ==
- AF Leiria Honour Division

Winners (3): 2007/08, 2014/15, 2017/18

- AF Leiria Cup

Winners (7): 1959/60, 1961/62, 1962/63, 1964/65, 1966/67, 2007/08, 2014/15

- AF Leiria Supercup

Winners (3): 2008/09, 2015/16, 2017/18

- AF Leiria Honour Cup

Winners (2): 1987/88, 1992/93

== Fans ==
The official supporters group of the club are the Red Seagulls 2520, as an allusion to the high amount of seagulls on the city, due to its proximity to Berlengas and of course the main colour of the club. The group was created in March 2018.
