= C.D.R. Quarteirense =

Portuguese football club

CDR Quarteirense
- Full name: Clube Desportivo e Recreativo Quarteirense
- Nickname: Lobos do Mar
- Founded: 2 January 1937; 88 years ago
- Ground: Estádio Municipal de Quarteira, Quarteira, Algarve, Portugal
- Capacity: 2,300
- President: (Portugal) António Manuel Trindade Figueiras (Tó Figueiras)
- Manager: (Portugal) Idálio Madeira e Bruno Ferrão
- League: Divisão Distrital AF Algarve
- 2011–12: Terceira Divisão Série F, 2nd (Promoted)
- Website: www.cdrquarteirense.com
Home colours	Away colours

Clube Desportivo e Recreativo Quarteirense, commonly known as Quarteirense, is a Portuguese football club from Quarteira, in the Algarve region. The club was founded on 2 January 1937.

For the 2012–13 season, the team is currently competing in the Algarve regional Division, having gained promotion at the end of last season, after being 2nd in the F series of Terceira Divisão. Its home ground is the Estádio Municipal de Quarteira, which has a capacity of 2,300 seats.

== Honours ==
- AF Algarve First Division (2): 2006/07, 2010/11
- AF Algarve Supercup (1): 2011/12
