= CD Lousanense =

Portuguese sports club

- Full name: Clube Desportivo Lousanense
- Founded: 1946
- Ground: Lousã
- League: I AF Coimbra
- 2019–20: 1st

Clube Desportivo Lousanense is a Portuguese sports club from Lousã.

The men's football team last played in the I AF Coimbra, which they won in 2019–20. The team played on the Portuguese second tier until the 1989–90 Segunda Divisão, subsequently finding themselves in the new third tier Segunda Divisão B until being relegated in 1994. Another relegation followed from the 1996–97 Terceira Divisão. Two more Terceira Divisão spells followed from 2000 to 2001 and 2007 to 2009.
