= Imortal D.C. =

Portuguese sports club

Imortal DC
- Full name: Imortal Desportivo Clube
- Founded: 1920; 106 years ago
- Ground: Municipal de Albufeira; Albufeira; Portugal
- Capacity: 3,500
- League: Campeonato de Portugal
- 2021–22: Campeonato de Portugal Série F, 7th place (did not get relegated in the next phase of the competition)
Home colours	Away colours

Imortal Desportivo Clube (abbreviated as Imortal DC and colloquially known as Imortal de Albufeira) is a Portuguese sports club centered around a football club based in the city of Albufeira, in the Portuguese region of Algarve. Imortal has also a quite noteworthy basketball team which has played in the Liga Portuguesa de Basquetebol, the top play tier in professional basketball in Portugal.

== Background ==
Imortal DC currently plays in Campeonato de Portugal which is now the fourth tier of the Portuguese football league system since a new league (Liga 3) was created in 2021. They finished 1st of the Algarve FA regional league in the 2020–2021 season as the league came to an end due to the COVID-19 pandemic, and the team with most points (Imortal DC at the time) was promoted to the Campeonato de Portugal. The club was founded in 1920 and they play their home matches at the Estádio Municipal de Albufeira in Albufeira. The club's main achievement was winning the Segunda Divisão Série Sul in 1998–99. This was followed by their highest league placing in 1999–2000 when they finished in 15th place in the Liga de Honra. Their second season in tier 2 in 2000–01 resulted in relegation and then followed a period of decline, including the withdrawal of a main sponsor, which culminated in them playing in AF Algarve 2ª Divisão, the sixth tier of Portuguese football, in 2008–09.

The club is affiliated to Associação de Futebol do Algarve and also competes in the AF Algarve Taça – The Algarve Cup. They reached the final in 2008–2009 while still in the 2ª Divisão. The club has also entered the national cup competition known as Taça de Portugal on many occasions.

The club has fairly successful teams at U-19 and U-17 level, as well as teams in lower age groups and small side football for the youngest boys – there are no women's or girls teams.

Fixtures and results can be found at the Algarve FA website. Most first team matches are played on Sundays at 3pm or 5 pm. The season begins at the end of September and ends in mid-May with the Algarve Cup Final.

== Players ==
=== Current squad ===
As of 12 November 2021

Note: Flags indicate national team as defined under FIFA eligibility rules; some limited exceptions apply. Players may hold more than one non-FIFA nationality.

No. / Pos. / Nation / Player; 21 / FW / POR / Marocas	No. / Pos. / Nation / Player; 90 / MF / POR / Leandro Pimenta

== Season to season ==
Season	Level	Division	Section	Place	Movements
1990–91	Tier 4	Terceira Divisão	Série F	2nd	Promoted
1991–92	Tier 3	Segunda Divisão	Série Sul	16th	Relegated
1992–93	Tier 4	Terceira Divisão	Série F	13th	
1993–94	Tier 4	Terceira Divisão	Série F	8th	
1994–95	Tier 4	Terceira Divisão	Série F	4th	
1995–96	Tier 4	Terceira Divisão	Série F	2nd	Promoted
1996–97	Tier 3	Segunda Divisão	Série Sul	10th	
1997–98	Tier 3	Segunda Divisão	Série Sul	9th	
1998–99	Tier 3	Segunda Divisão	Série Sul	1st	Promoted
1999–2000	Tier 2	Liga de Honra		15th	
2000–01	Tier 2	Liga de Honra		17th	Relegated
2001–02	Tier 3	Segunda Divisão	Série Sul	10th	
2002–03	Tier 3	Segunda Divisão	Série Sul	16th	Relegated
2003–04	Tier 4	Terceira Divisão	Série F	3rd	
2004–05	Tier 4	Terceira Divisão	Série F	2nd	Promoted
2005–06	Tier 3	Segunda Divisão	Série D	9th	
2006–07	Tier 3	Segunda Divisão	Série D	12th	Relegated
2007–08	Tier 4	Terceira Divisão	Série F – 1ª Fase	13th	Relegation Group
	Tier 4	Terceira Divisão	Série F – Sub-Série F1	4th	Relegated
2008–09	Tier 6	Distritais	AF Algarve – 2ª Divisão	4th	Promoted
2009–10	Tier 5	Distritais	AF Algarve – 1ª Divisão	13th	
2010–11	Tier 5	Distritais	AF Algarve – 1ª Divisão	13th	
2011–12	Tier 5	Distritais	AF Algarve – 1ª Divisão	7th	
2012–13	Tier 5	Distritais	AF Algarve – 1ª Divisão	2nd	
2013–14	Tier 4	Distritais	AF Algarve – 1ª Divisão	3rd	
2014–15	Tier 4	Distritais	AF Algarve – 1ª Divisão	11th	
2015-16	Tier 4	Distritais	AF Algarve – 1ª Divisão	8th	
2016-17	Tier 4	Distritais	AF Algarve – 1ª Divisão	8th	Format changed to 12 teams in two phases
2017-18	Tier 4	Distritais	AF Algarve – 1ª Divisão		in progress

== Honours ==
- Portuguese Second Division
  - Champions (1): 1998–99 (Série Sul)

== Notable players ==
- (Angola) Calita
- (Angola) Eldon Maquemba
- (Azerbaijan) Vali Gasimov
- (Brazil) Detinho
- (Brazil) Jean Paulista
- (Brazil) René Rivas
- (Cape Verde) Lito
- (Cape Verde) Pelé
- (Cyprus) Dossa Júnior
- (El Salvador) Israel Castro
- (Guinea) Abdoul Salam Sow
- (Mozambique) Chiquinho Conde
- (Portugal) Chiquinho
- (Portugal) Tiago Ilori
- (Portugal) Hélder Lourenço
- (Portugal) João Paulo
- (Portugal) Paulo Torres
- (Portugal) Vítor Valente

== Notable coaches ==
- (Romania) Iosif Fabian
- (Portugal) Ricardo Formosinho
- (Spain) Paco Fortes
- (Bulgaria) Nikola Spasov

== Gallery ==
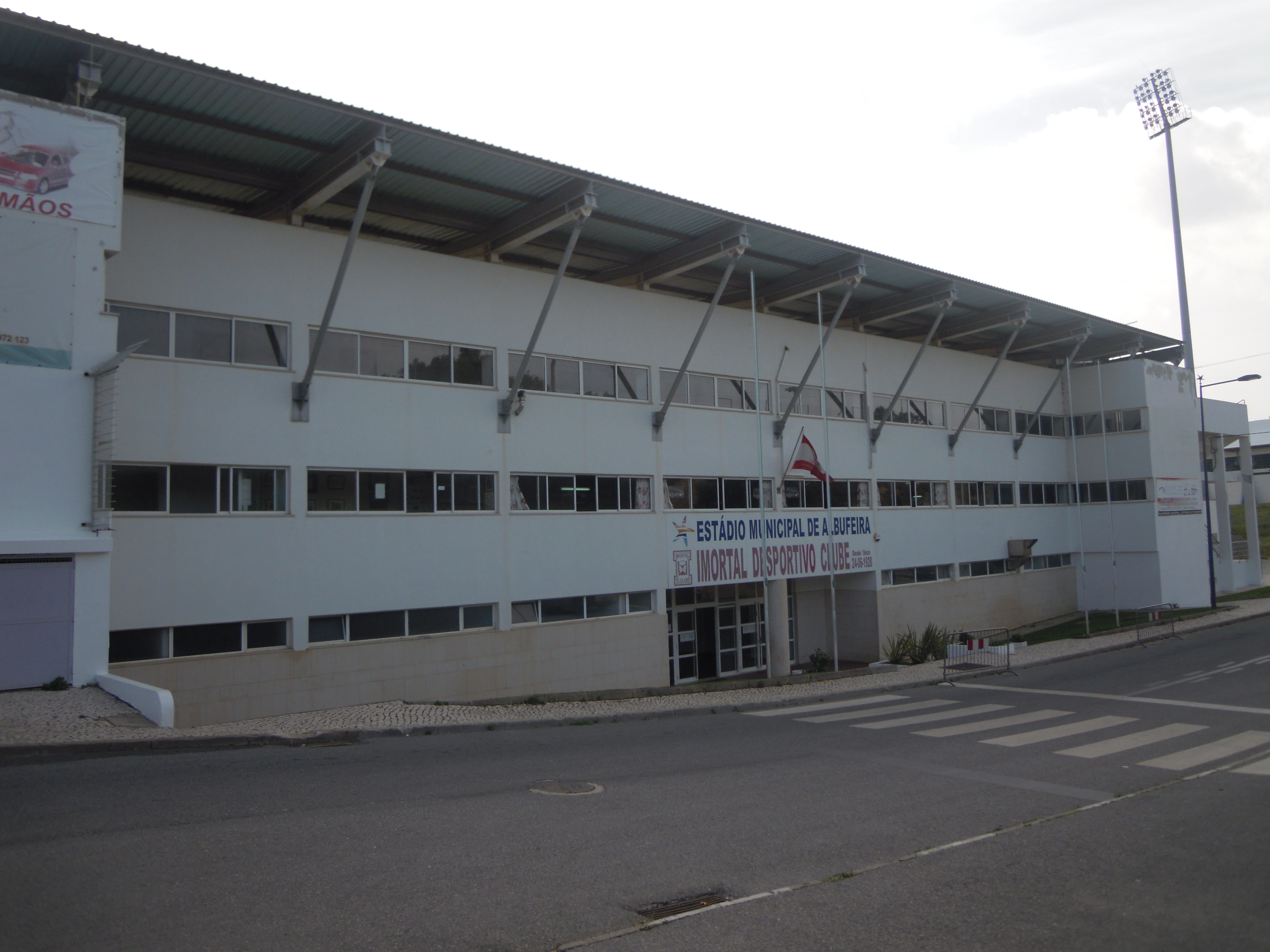
Estádio Municipal de Albufeira, the home stadium of the team.

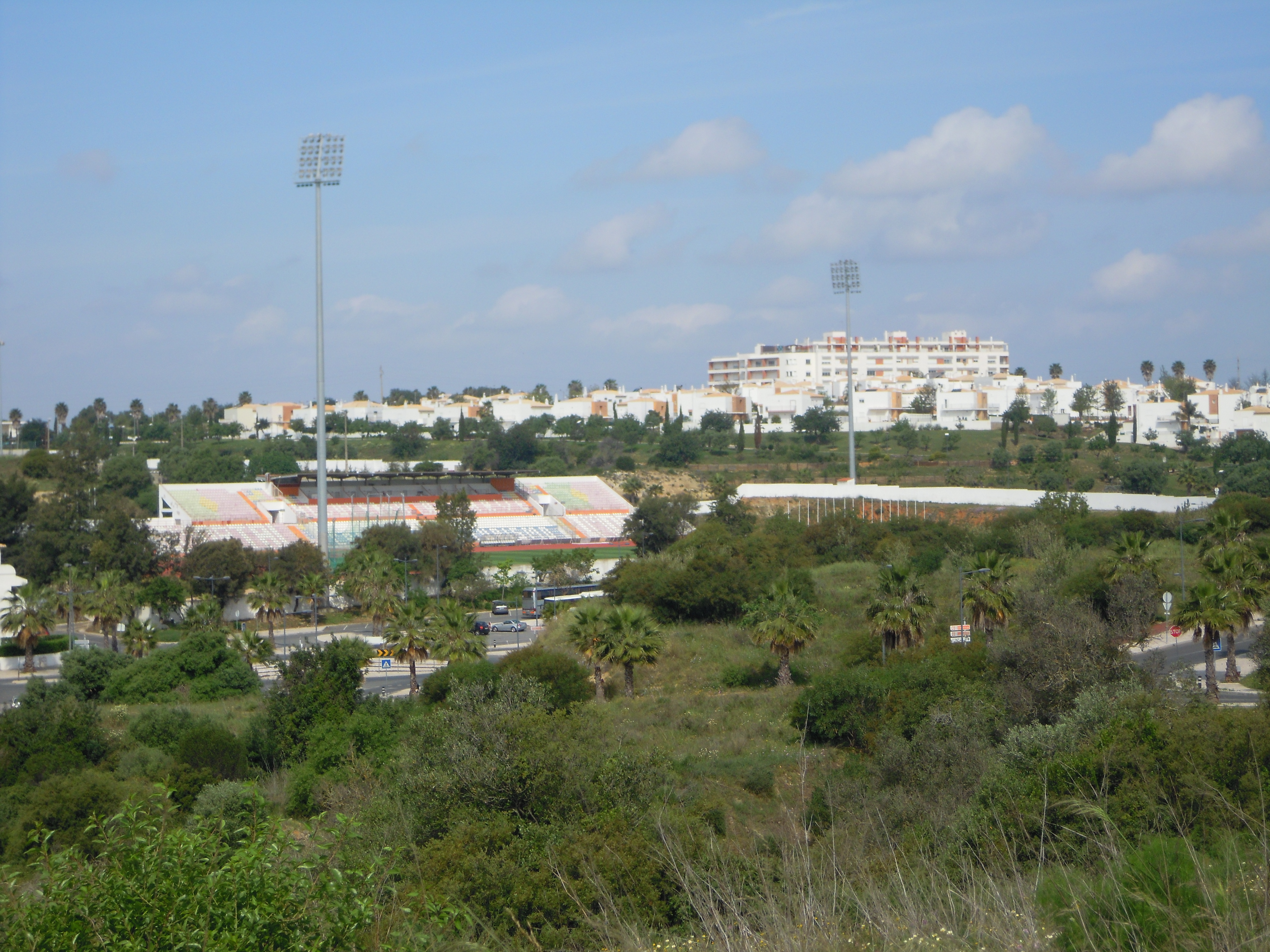
Estádio Municipal de Albufeira

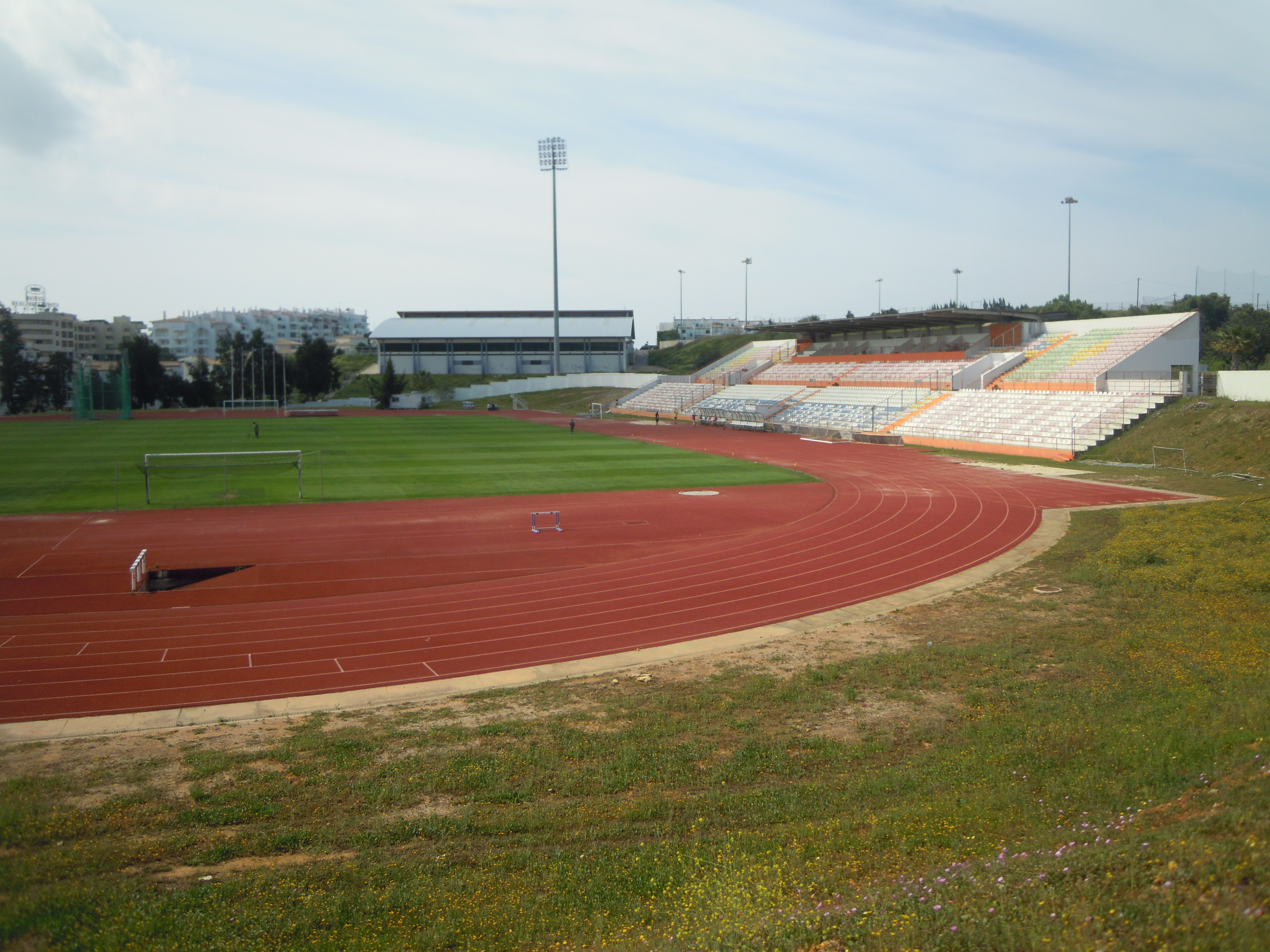
The main stand in the Estádio Municipal de Albufeira
