= Louletano D.C. =

Portuguese association football club

Louletano
- Full name: Louletano Desportos Clube
- Founded: 1923; 103 years ago
- Ground: Estádio do Algarve; Faro, Portugal
- Capacity: 30,305
- Chairman: António Brito do Adro
- Manager: Miguel Valença
- League: Liga 3
- 2025–26: Campeonato de Portugal, Serie D, 1st (promoted)
Home colours	Away colours

Louletano Desportos Clube is a Portuguese club from Loulé, founded on 6 June 1923. The association football team plays in the Liga 3.

The club plays at the Estádio Algarve, a stadium which it shared with Sporting Clube Farense between 2004 and 2013, when that club moved back to a renovated Estádio de São Luís. Some home matches are played at the Loulé Municipal Stadium.

== Current squad ==
As of 21 September 2026

Note: Flags indicate national team as defined under FIFA eligibility rules; some limited exceptions apply. Players may hold more than one non-FIFA nationality.

No.	Pos.	Nation	Player
1	GK	BRA	Gustavo Daris
2	DF	BRA	Carlinhos
3	DF	POR	Tiago Correia
6	MF	POR	Tomás Vilela
7	FW	POR	Rodrigo Vilela
8	MF	BRA	Sander Lemes
9	FW	POR	Gonçalo Teixeira
10	MF	POR	Vítor Gonçalves
11	FW	ANG	Adair Kandala
12	DF	BRA	Gabi Passos
13	GK	POR	João Farrajota
14	DF	NED	Luca van der Gaag
17	MF	BRA	Yan Marinho

No.	Pos.	Nation	Player
18	DF	POR	David Martins
19	MF	POR	Tiago Sousa
21	DF	POR	Martim Cruz
23	FW	BRA	Daniel Paulino
27	FW	POR	Nuno Martelo
29	DF	POR	Rodrigo Teixeira
65	MF	BRA	Dedé
71	GK	BRA	Marcão
87	MF	POR	Alexandre Dias
88	MF	POR	Miguel Laginha
90	FW	POR	Diogo Teixeira
97	DF	CPV	Elvis Mendes
—	MF	POR	Ricardo Leal

=== Out on loan ===
Note: Flags indicate national team as defined under FIFA eligibility rules; some limited exceptions apply. Players may hold more than one non-FIFA nationality.

No.	Pos.	Nation	Player
—	FW	POR	Leandro Ferreira (at Amarante until 30 June 2027)

== See also ==
- Louletano Desportos Clube (cycling)
