= 2003–04 Taça de Portugal =

Tournament details
- Country: Portugal
- Dates: 7 September 2003 – 16 May 2004
- Teams: 228

Final positions
- Champions: Benfica (24th title)
- Runners-up: Porto

Tournament statistics
- Matches played: 227
- Goals scored: 742 (3.27 per match)
- Top goal scorer(s): Constantino; Edgaras Jankauskas; Edson; Igor; Tiago; Tomo Šokota (3 goals each)

The 2003–04 Taça de Portugal was the 64th edition of the Portuguese football knockout tournament organized by the Portuguese Football Federation (FPF). This edition of the Taça de Portugal began on 7 September 2003, and concluded on 16 May 2004 with the final at the Estádio Nacional.

Porto were the previous holders, having defeated União de Leiria 1–0 in the previous season's final. Benfica defeated Porto 2–1 in the final to win their 24th Taça de Portugal, dedicated to Miklós Fehér. Benfica's cup success would gain them qualification to the 2004 Supertaça Cândido de Oliveira.

== Format and schedule ==
Round	Date(s)	Clubs entering this round	Clubs from the previous round	Clubs involved	Fixtures
First round ^{[1]}	7 September 2003	137 clubs competing in the Terceira Divisão and Portuguese District Leagues	none	137	68
Second round ^{[2]}	28 September 2003	54 clubs competing in the Segunda Divisão	68 winners from the first round	124	62
Third round	11–12 October 2003	18 clubs competing in the Liga de Honra	62 winners from the second round	80	40
Fourth round	22–23 November 2003	18 clubs competing in the Primeira Liga	40 winners from third round	58	29
Fifth round	17 December 2003	none	29 winners from fourth round	29	14
Sixth round	14 January 2004	none	14 winners from fifth round	15	7
Quarter-finals	11 February 2004	none	7 winners from sixth round	8	4
Semi-finals	16–17 March 2004	none	4 winners from the quarterfinals	4	2
Final	16 May 2004	none	2 winners from the semifinals	2	1

1. ^1 As many as 116 of the 118 teams competing in the 2003–04 Terceira Divisão played in this round. Benfica B were unable to compete in the domestic cup competition due to the possibility of encountering their senior side in the competition. Queluz also did not participate.
2. ^2 Out of the 59 teams competing in the 2003–04 Segunda Divisão, 54 played in this round. Académica de Coimbra B, Braga B, Marítimo B, Porto B and Sporting CP B were unable to compete in the domestic cup competition due to the possibility of encountering their senior side in the competition. Queluz also did not participate.

== Teams ==
=== Primeira Liga ===
- Académica de Coimbra
- Alverca
- Beira-Mar
- Belenenses
- Benfica
- Boavista
- Braga
- Estrela da Amadora
- Gil Vicente
- Marítimo
- Moreirense
- Nacional
- Paços de Ferreira
- Porto
- Rio Ave
- Sporting CP
- União de Leiria
- Vitória de Guimarães

=== Liga de Honra ===
- Chaves
- Desportivo das Aves
- Estoril
- Feirense
- Felgueiras
- Leixões
- Maia
- Marco
- Naval
- Ovarense
- Penafiel
- Portimonense
- Rabo de Peixe
- Salgueiros
- Santa Clara
- Sporting da Covilhã
- União da Madeira
- Varzim
- Vitória de Setúbal

=== Second Division ===
North Zone

- Bragança
- Caçadores das Taipas
- Dragões Sandinenses
- Ermesinde
- Fafe
- Freamunde
- Gondomar
- Infesta
- Leça
- Lixa
- Lousada
- Paredes
- Pedras Rubras
- Trofense
- Valdevez
- Vilanovense
- Vizela

Central Zone

- Académico de Viseu
- Águeda
- Alcains
- Caldas
- Esmoriz
- Estarreja
- Fátima
- Marinhense
- Oliveira do Bairro
- Oliveira do Hospital
- Oliveirense
- Pampilhosa
- Portomosense
- Sanjoanense
- Sporting de Espinho
- Sporting de Pombal
- Torreense
- União de Lamas
- Vilafranquense

South Zone

- Amora
- Barreirense
- Camacha
- Estrela Vendas Novas
- Farense
- Louletano
- Lusitânia
- Mafra
- Odivelas
- Olhanense
- Olivais e Moscavide
- Oriental
- Pinhalnovense
- Pontassolense
- Ribeira Brava
- Santo António
- Sintrense
- União Micaelense

=== Third Division ===
Série A

- Amares
- Cabeceirense
- Cerveira
- Esposende
- Joane
- Juventude de Ronfe
- Maria da Fonte
- Mirandela
- Monção
- Montalegre
- Os Sandinenses
- Ponte da Barca
- Rebordelo
- Santa Maria
- Valenciano
- Valpaços
- Vianense
- Vilaverdense

Série B

- AD Oliveirense
- Aliados Lordelo
- Canelas
- Cinfães
- Famalicão
- Fiães
- Lourosa
- Nogueirense
- Paços de Brandão
- Pedrouços
- Rebordosa
- Régua
- Ribeirão
- Rio Tinto
- São Pedro da Cova
- Tirsense
- Torre de Moncorvo
- Vila Real

Série C

- Aguiar da Beira
- Anadia
- Arouca
- Arrifanense
- Cesarense
- Fornos de Algodres
- Gafanha
- Mangualde
- Milheiroense
- Penalva do Castelo
- Santacombadense
- São João de Ver
- Sátão
- Social Lamas
- Tocha
- Tourizense
- União de Coimbra
- Valecambrense

Série D

- Abrantes
- Alcobaça
- Alqueidão da Serra
- Atlético Riachense
- Benfica Castelo Branco
- Beneditense
- Bidoeirense
- Caranguejeira
- Fazendense
- Idanhense
- Lourinhanense
- Mirense
- Peniche
- Rio Maior
- Sertanense
- Sourense
- Torres Novas
- União Almeirim

Série E

- 1º de Dezembro
- Alcochetense
- Benavilense
- Câmara de Lobos
- Carregado
- Casa Pia
- Loures
- Machico
- Malveira
- Montijo
- O Elvas
- Portosantense
- Sacavenense
- Santacruzense
- Santana
- Vialonga

Série F

- Almancilense
- Atlético CP
- Beira-Mar de Monte Gordo
- Desportivo de Beja
- Esperança de Lagos
- Fabril Barreiro
- Imortal
- Juventude de Évora
- Lusitano VRSA
- Messinense
- Monte Trigo
- Moura
- Quarteirense
- Seixal
- Sesimbra
- Silves
- União Santiago
- Vasco da Gama AC

Série Azores

- Angrense
- Barreiro
- Boavista Flores
- Madalena
- Mira Mar
- Operário
- Praiense
- Santiago
- Sporting de Ideal
- Velense

=== District Leagues ===
- Águias de Alpiarça
- Águias do Moradal
- Atei
- Avintes
- Bombarralense
- CF Vasco da Gama
- Eléctrico
- Estrela da Calheta
- Fayal
- Ginásio Figueirense
- Lagoa
- Macedo de Cavaleiros
- Moitense
- Neves
- Os Leões
- Paivense
- Penelense
- UD Valonguense
- União de Montemor
- União Torcatense

== First round ==
For the first round draw, teams were drawn against each other in accordance to their geographical location. The draw was split up into four sections: teams from the north, the center, the south and the Azores region. All first round cup ties were played on the 7 September. Due to the odd number of teams at this stage of the competition, Rabo de Peixe progressed to the next round due to having no opponent to face at this stage of the competition. The first round of the cup saw teams from the Terceira Divisão (IV) start the competition alongside some teams who registered to participate in the cup from the Portuguese District Leagues (V).

=== North Zone ===
Home team	Score	Away team
AD Oliveirense (IV)	3–2	Joane (IV)
Atei (V)	0–1	Amares (IV)
Avintes (V)	2–0	Ponte da Barca (IV)
Cabeceirense (IV)	4–1	Macedo de Cavaleiros (V)
Canelas (IV)	2–3	Neves (V)
Cerveira (IV)	1–3 (aet)	Pedrouços (IV)
Cinfães (IV)	3–0	Régua (IV)
Esposende (IV)	5–0	Paivense (V)
Famalicão (IV)	4–3	Aliados Lordelo (IV)
Juventude de Ronfe (IV)	1–3	Mirandela (IV)
Monção (IV)	1–2	Vilaverdense (IV)

Home team	Score	Away team
Os Sandinenses (IV)	2–0	Valpaços (IV)
Paços de Brandão (IV)	2–2 (aet, p. 4–2)	Fiães (IV)
Rebordelo (IV)	0–2	Montalegre (IV)
Rebordosa (IV)	0–0 (aet, p. 5–3)	Rio Tinto (IV)
Ribeirão (IV)	4–2	Tirsense (IV)
Santa Maria (IV)	3–0	União Torcatense (V)
São Pedro da Cova (IV)	1–1 (aet, p. 4–5)	Vianense (IV)
Torre de Moncorvo (IV)	1–0	Maria da Fonte (IV)
Valenciano (IV)	0–1	Nogueirense (IV)
Vila Real (IV)	0–0 (aet, p. 5–4)	Lourosa (IV)

=== Central Zone ===
Home team	Score	Away team
Águias Alpiarça (V)	2–2 (aet, p. 5–4)	Cesarense (IV)
Aguiar da Beira (IV)	5–2 (aet)	Atlético Riachense (IV)
Alqueidão da Serra (IV)	0–4	Benfica Castelo Branco (IV)
Anadia (IV)	4–1	Águias do Moradal (V)
Arouca (IV)	2–0	União Almeirim (IV)
Arrifanense (IV)	1–0	Bombarralense (V)
Bidoeirense (IV)	4–3	Caranguejeira (IV)
Fornos de Algodres (IV)	0–0 (aet, p. 4–5)	Abrantes (IV)
Gafanha (IV)	2–1 (aet)	Valecambrense (IV)
Idanhense (IV)	2–1 (aet)	Tourizense (IV)
Lourinhanense (IV)	1–1 (aet, p. 5–4)	Beneditense (IV)

Home team	Score	Away team
Mangualde (IV)	2–2 (aet, p. 3–5)	Sourense (IV)
Milheiroense (IV)	2–1	Ginásio Figueirense (V)
Mirense (IV)	2–3	Alcobaça (IV)
Penalva do Castelo (IV)	1–0	Fazendense (IV)
Penelense (V)	2–3 (aet)	Tocha (IV)
Peniche (IV)	3–4 (aet)	São João de Ver (IV)
Rio Maior (IV)	2–0	Torres Novas (IV)
Sátão (IV)	3–1	União de Coimbra (IV)
Sertanense (IV)	0–1	UD Valonguense (V)
Social Lamas (IV)	1–1 (aet, p. 3–4)	Santacombadense (IV)

=== South Zone ===
Home team	Score	Away team
Beira-Mar de Monte Gordo (IV)	0–1	1º de Dezembro (IV)
Câmara de Lobos (IV)	3–1	Sacavenense (IV)
Carregado (IV)	2–3	Fabril Barreiro (IV)
CF Vasco da Gama (V)	2–1	Benavilense (IV)
Desportivo de Beja (IV)	1–2 (aet)	Portosantense (IV)
Eléctrico (V)	3–1	Olivais (IV)
Estrela da Calheta (V)	2–0	Lagoa (V)
Imortal (IV)	3–0	O Elvas (IV)
Loures (IV)	1–1 (aet, p. 5–4)	Alcochetense (IV)
Lusitano VRSA (IV)	0–1	Real (IV)

Home team	Score	Away team
Messinense (IV)	0–2	Atlético CP (IV)
Monte Trigo (IV)	1–0	Almancilense (IV)
Montijo (IV)	4–2	Esperança de Lagos (V)
Quarteirense (IV)	2–0	Moura (IV)
Seixal (IV)	2–1 (aet)	Machico (IV)
Sesimbra (IV)	4–1	Vialonga (IV)
Silves (IV)	7–1	Santacruzense (IV)
União de Montemor (V)	1–2	Santana (IV)
União de Santiago (IV)	3–0	Juventude de Évora (IV)
Vasco Gama AC (IV)	0–1	Moitense (V)

=== Azores Zone ===
Home team	Score	Away team
Barreiro (IV)	5–1	Fayal (V)
Madalena (IV)	2–1	Os Leões (V)
Mira Mar (IV)	0–3	Operário (IV)

Home team	Score	Away team
Praiense (IV)	3–1	Santiago (IV)
Sporting de Ideal (IV)	3–1	Boavista Flores (IV)
Velense (IV)	1–2	Angrense (IV)

== Second round ==
For the second round draw, teams were drawn against each other in accordance to their geographical location. The draw was split up into three sections: teams from the north, the center and the south. Ties were played on the 28 September. The second round saw teams from the Portuguese Second Division (III) enter the competition.

=== North Zone ===
Home team	Score	Away team
Avintes (V)	6–0	Neves (V)
Bragança (III)	3–0	Ribeirão (IV)
Cabeceirense (IV)	2–1 (aet)	Dragões Sandinenses (III)
Os Sandinenses (IV)	1–2	Caçadores das Taipas (III)
Ermesinde (III)	1–3	Amares (IV)
Freamunde (III)	1–0	Vila Real (IV)
Gondomar (III)	0–2	Santa Maria (IV)
Infesta (III)	2–0	Vilaverdense (IV)
Leça (III)	5–1 (aet)	Montalegre (IV)

Home team	Score	Away team
Lixa (III)	3–0	AD Oliveirense (IV)
Nogueirense (IV)	6–2 (aet)	Lousada (III)
Paredes (III)	3–0	Rebordosa (IV)
Pedras Rubras (III)	1–1 (aet, p. 5–4)	Vilanovense (III)
Pedrouços (IV)	1–0	F.C. Vizela (III)
Torre de Moncorvo (IV)	3–1	Mirandela (IV)
Trofense (III)	1–1 (aet, p. 3–4)	Famalicão (IV)
Valdevez (III)	3–1 (aet)	Esposende (IV)
Vianense (IV)	1–3 (aet)	Fafe (III)

=== Central Zone ===
Home team	Score	Away team
Académico de Viseu (III)	4–1	Tocha (IV)
Alcains (III)	1–0 (aet)	Torreense (III)
Alcobaça (IV)	1–3	Oliveirense (III)
Abrantes (IV)	2–3	Penalva do Castelo (IV)
Bidoeirense (IV)	1–6	Rio Maior (IV)
Idanhense (IV)	0–2	Cinfães (IV)
Lourinhanense (IV)	3–1	Benfica Castelo Branco (IV)
Marinhense (III)	2–1	Águeda (III)
Milheiroense (IV)	0–0 (aet, p. 1–3)	União de Lamas (III)
Oliveira do Bairro (III)	1–5	Caldas (III)
Paços de Brandão (IV)	1–0	Águias de Alpiarça (V)

Home team	Score	Away team
Pampilhosa (III)	1–1 (aet, p. 3–1)	Anadia (IV)
Portomosense (III)	3–3 (aet, p. 5–3)	Arouca (IV)
Sanjoanense (III)	3–0	Aguiar da Beira (IV)
Santacombadense (IV)	3–3 (aet, p. 3–4)	Esmoriz (III)
São João de Ver (IV)	3–1	Arrifanense (IV)
Sátão (IV)	1–0	Oliveira do Hospital (III)
Sourense (IV)	2–0	Gafanha (IV)
Sporting de Espinho (III)	1–0	Sporting de Pombal (III)
UD Valonguense (V)	1–2	Fátima (III)
Vilafranquense (III)	1–0	Estarreja (III)

=== South Zone ===
Home team	Score	Away team
1º de Dezembro (IV)	3–1	Monte Trigo (IV)
Amora (III)	2–0	Fabril Barreiro (IV)
Barreirense (III)	4–1	Imortal (IV)
Barreiro (IV)	1–0	Sintrense (III)
Câmara de Lobos (IV)	4–1	Operário (IV)
CF Vasco da Gama (V)	2–2 (aet, p. 3–2)	Quarteirense (IV)
Estrela Vendas Novas (III)	2–1	União Micaelense (III)
Farense (III)	3–0	Praiense (IV)
Louletano (III)	1–0	Estrela da Calheta (V)
Loures (IV)	2–1	Oriental (III)
Lusitânia (III)	2–0	Portosantense (IV)
Madalena (IV)	0–1	Atlético CP (IV)

Home team	Score	Away team
Mafra (III)	2–0	Montijo (IV)
Moitense (V)	1–1 (aet, p. 4–3)	Camacha (III)
Odivelas (III)	4–2	Pontassolense (III)
Olhanense (III)	5–1	Angrense (IV)
Pinhalnovense (III)	1–0	Olivais e Moscavide (III)
Rabo Peixe (V)	1–2 (aet)	Eléctrico (V)
Real (IV)	1–3	Seixal (IV)
Ribeira Brava (III)	1–1 (aet, p. 2–4)	Santiago (IV)
Santana (IV)	2–4 (aet)	Casa Pia (IV)
Santo António (III)	1–1 (aet, p. 3–2)	Silves (IV)
Sesimbra (IV)	4–5	Sporting de Ideal (IV)

== Third round ==
The draw for the third round took place on the 2 October. Ties were played on the 11–12 October. The third round saw teams from the Liga de Honra (II) enter the competition.

Home team	Score	Away team
Estoril (II)	2–0	Penalva do Castelo (IV)
Felgueiras (II)	5–0	Santa Maria (IV)
1º de Dezembro (IV)	1–0	Amora (III)
Atlético CP (IV)	1–0 (aet)	Barreirense (III)
Bragança (III)	2–4	Leça (III)
Caldas (III)	2–3	Paredes (III)
Câmara de Lobos (IV)	2–1	Famalicão (IV)
CF Vasco da Gama (V)	2–9	Maia (II)
Estrela Vendas Novas (III)	1–3	Lourinhanense (IV)
Fafe (III)	4–0	Esmoriz (III)
Fátima (III)	3–1	Alcains (III)
Feirense (II)	1–0	Caçadores das Taipas (III)
Freamunde (III)	2–1	Mafra (III)
Infesta (III)	4–1	Académico de Viseu (III)
Lixa (III)	1–1 (aet, p. 2–3)	Vitória de Setúbal (II)
Louletano (III)	1–1 (aet, p. 6–5)	Santa Clara (II)
Lusitânia (III)	5–5 (aet, p. 4–5)	Oliveirense (III)
Marco (II)	2–1	Torre de Moncorvo (IV)
Marinhense (III)	1–2 (aet)	Cinfães (IV)
Moitense (V)	0–4	Sporting da Covilhã (II)

Home team	Score	Away team
Naval (II)	2–2 (aet, p. 5–4)	Chaves (II)
Nogueirense (IV)	4–1	Cabeceirense (IV)
Odivelas (III)	0–1	Sourense (IV)
Olhanense (III)	1–3 (aet)	Salgueiros (II)
Ovarense (II)	2–0	Farense (III)
Paços de Brandão (IV)	1–0	Amares (IV)
Pampilhosa (III)	2–4	Desportivo das Aves (II)
Pedrouços (IV)	4–3 (aet)	Pedras Rubras (III)
Penafiel (II)	2–0	Sporting de Espinho (III)
Portomosense (III)	5–0	Eléctrico (V)
Rio Maior (IV)	2–2 (aet, p. 2–3)	Casa Pia (IV)
Sanjoanense (III)	3–1 (aet)	Pinhalnovense (III)
Santo António (III)	2–0	Avintes (V)
Sátão (IV)	0–3	Leixões (II)
Seixal (IV)	1–2	Portimonense (II)
Sporting Ideal (IV)	1–4	São João de Ver (IV)
União da Madeira (II)	3–0	Loures (IV)
União de Lamas (III)	4–1	Barreiro (IV)
Vilafranquense (III)	2–0	Valdevez (III)
Varzim (II)	3–1	Santiago (IV)

== Fourth round ==
All fourth round cup ties were played on the 22–23 November. The fourth round saw teams from the Primeira Liga (I) enter the competition.

Home team	Score	Away team
Porto (I)	1–0	Boavista (I)
Benfica (I)	3–1	Estrela da Amadora (I)
1º de Dezembro (IV)	0–2	Sporting CP (I)
Académica de Coimbra (I)	4–2	Infesta (III)
AD Oliveirense (IV)	0–2	Penafiel (II)
Alverca (I)	0–1	Vitória de Setúbal (II)
Atlético CP (IV)	0–1	Rio Ave (I)
Belenenses (I)	2–0	Desportivo das Aves (II)
Câmara de Lobos (IV)	0–1	Nacional (I)
Cinfães (IV)	1–0	Paredes (III)
Estoril (II)	2–1	Casa Pia (IV)
Fátima (III)	0–2	Vilafranquense (III)
Felgueiras (II)	2–1	Sourense (IV)
Gil Vicente (I)	0–2	Sanjoanense (III)
Leça (III)	4–2	Portomosense (III)

Home team	Score	Away team
Leixões II)	0–2	Naval (II)
Lourinhanense (IV)	2–3	Beira-Mar (I)
Maia (II)	1–0	União da Madeira (II)
Marítimo (I)	2–0	Feirense (II)
Moreirense (I)	2–0	Fafe (III)
Paços de Brandão (IV)	0–6	Braga (I)
Paços de Ferreira (I)	2–1	Ovarense (II)
Pedrouços (IV)	4–2	Louletano (III)
Portimonense (II)	5–4	Nogueirense (IV)
Salgueiros (II)	2–0	Freamunde (III)
Santo António (III)	2–0	Varzim (II)
Sporting da Covilhã (II)	0–4	União de Leiria (I)
União de Lamas (III)	0–1	Marco (II)
Vitória de Guimarães (I)	3–0	São João de Ver (IV)

== Fifth round ==
Ties were played on the 17 December. Felgueiras won their fifth round cup tie against Vilafranquense, but their win was overturned and Vilafranquense progressed to the next round due to Felgueiras' coach appearing at the tie to manage his side when he was supposed to be suspended. Due to the odd number of teams involved at this stage of the competition, Braga qualified for the quarter-finals due to having no opponent to face at this stage of the competition.

17 December 2003	Sanjoanense (III)	2–3	Moreirense (I)	Estádio Conde Dias Garcia, São João da Madeira
14:30	Quim Pedro 13'; Rui Miguel 22'		R. Fernandes 29'; Primo 43'; Demétrios 54' (pen.)	Referee: Jorge Sousa

17 December 2003	Belenenses (I)	2–1	Penafiel (II)	Estádio do Restelo, Lisbon
15:00	Eliseu 81'; Leonardo 90'		Wesley 24'	Referee: André Gralha

17 December 2003	Estoril (II)	6–0	Leça (III)	Estádio António Coimbra da Mota, Estoril
15:00	Marcão 31', 38' (pen.), 88'; Marcos Antônio 36'; Marco Paulo 56'; Everaldo 83'			Referee: Nélio Mendonça

17 December 2003	Felgueiras (II)	0–3	Vilafranquense (III)	Estádio Dr. Machado de Mato, Felgueiras
15:00				Referee: João Roque

17 December 2003	Marco (II)	3–0	Pedrouços (IV)	Estádio Municipal Marco de Canaveses, Marco de Canaveses
15:00	Rui Gomes 2'; Jurandir 72'; Rogério 89'			Referee: Rui Costa

17 December 2003	Paços de Ferreira (I)	0–1	Portimonense (II)	Estádio da Mata Real, Paços de Ferreira
15:00			Augusto 52'	Referee: Mário Mendes

17 December 2003	Rio Ave (I)	1–0	Beira-Mar (I)	Estádio do Rio Ave FC, Vila do Conde
15:00	Jacques 42'			Referee: Pedro Henriques

17 December 2003	Santo António (III)	2–0	Cinfães (IV)	Estádio Figueiras, Ponta Delgada
15:00	Pacheco 12'; E. Simão 39'			Referee: Hernâni Duarte

17 December 2003	União de Leiria (I)	3–1	Marítimo (I)	Estádio Municipal da Marinha Grande, Leiria
15:00	Douala 45'; João Paulo 51'; Maciel 87'		Eduardo Oliveira 29' (o.g.)	Referee: Augusto Duarte

17 December 2003	Nacional (I)	4–0	Salgueiros (II)	Estádio Engenheiro Rui Alves, Madeira
16:00	Adriano 14', 29'; Baiano 64'; Leandro 72'			Referee: Lucílio Batista

17 December 2003	Vitória de Guimarães (I)	0–2	Naval (II)	Estádio D. Afonso Henriques, Guimarães
16:00			Baha 26' (pen.), 59'	Referee: Martins dos Santos

17 December 2003	Sporting CP (I)	0–1	Vitória de Setúbal (II)	Estádio José Alvalade, Lisbon
20:30			Orestes 7'	Referee: Paulo Paraty

17 December 2003	Porto (I)	3–0	Maia (II)	Estádio das Antas, Porto
21:00	McCarthy 25'; Maniche 80'; Alenichev 90'			Referee: Nuno Almeida

17 December 2003	Académica de Coimbra (I)	0–1	Benfica (I)	Estádio Cidade de Coimbra, Coimbra
21:15			Luisão 21'	Referee: Paulo Costa

== Sixth round ==
Ties were played on the 14–21 January. Due to the odd number of teams involved at this stage of the competition, Benfica qualified for the quarter-finals due to having no opponent to face at this stage of the competition.

14 January 2004	Marco (II)	0–0 (a.e.t.) (7–8 p)	Naval (II)	Estádio Municipal Marco de Canaveses, Marco de Canaveses
15:00				Referee: Pedro Proença
	Penalties
	Glauber (penalty missed) (penalty scored) (penalty scored) (penalty scored) (penalty scored) (penalty scored) (penalty scored) (penalty scored); Vitinha (penalty missed)		(penalty missed) Fernando (penalty scored) (penalty scored) (penalty scored) (penalty scored) (penalty scored) (penalty scored) (penalty scored) (penalty scored)

14 January 2004	Rio Ave (I)	2–1	Portimonense S.C. (II)	Estádio do Rio Ave FC, Vila do Conde
15:00	Paulo César 69'; Van Es 90+3'		Lino 57'	Referee: João Ferreira

14 January 2004	União de Leiria (I)	1–2	Nacional (I)	Estádio Dr. Magalhães Pessoa, Leiria
15:00	H. Almeida 1'		Goulart 51'; Álvarez 85' (pen.)	Referee: Martins dos Santos

14 January 2004	Moreirense (I)	1–2	Braga (I)	Parque de Jogos Comendador Joaquim de Almeida Freitas, Moreira de Cónegos
16:00	Demétrios 69'		Bruno 45' (o.g.); Narcisse 75'	Referee: Carlos Xistra

14 January 2004	Belenenses (I)	4–0	Santo António (III)	Estádio do Restelo, Lisbon
18:30	Pelé 37'; Leonardo 54'; Marco Paulo 70'; Verona 90+1'			Referee: António Costa

14 January 2004	Estoril (II)	1–0	Vitória de Setúbal (II)	Estádio António Coimbra da Mota, Estoril
20:30	Buba 13'			Referee: Jorge Sousa

21 January 2004	Porto (I)	4–0	Vilafranquense (III)	Estádio das Antas, Porto
	Carlos Alberto 23', 76'; M. Ferreira 28'; Conceição 65' (pen.)			Referee: Paulo Pereira

== Quarter-finals ==
All quarter-final ties were played on the 11 February.

11 February 2004	Rio Ave (I)	1–2	Porto (I)	Estádio do Rio Ave FC, Vila do Conde
	R. Carvalho 46' (o.g.)		Costinha 21'; Moraes 39'	Referee: Martins dos Santos

11 February 2004	Benfica (I)	2–1	Nacional (I)	Estádio da Luz, Lisbon
15:00	Tiago 85'; Šokota 86'		Baiano 22'	Referee: Bruno Paixão

11 February 2004	Naval (II)	2–3	Braga (I)	Estádio Municipal José Bento Pessoa, Figueira da Foz
15:00	Fernando 6'; Carlitos 59'		Paulo Sérgio 26'; Wender 73'; Igor 82'	Referee: Lucílio Batista

11 February 2004	Belenenses (I)	2–2 (a.e.t.) (5–4 p)	Estoril (II)	Estádio do Restelo, Lisbon
19:00	Hugo Henrique 17', 114'		Fellahi 21'; Marco Paulo 99'	Referee: Paulo Costa
	Penalties
	Verona (penalty scored); Neca (penalty scored); Hugo Henrique (penalty scored); Ceará (penalty missed); Valdiram (penalty missed); C. Fernandes (penalty scored); José Sousa (penalty missed); Antchouet (penalty scored)		(penalty scored) Pinheiro; (penalty scored) Fellahi; (penalty scored) Marco Paulo; (penalty missed) Dorival; (penalty missed) Barreto; (penalty scored) Vidais; (penalty missed) Paulo Sousa; (penalty missed) João Pedro

== Semi-finals ==
Ties were played on the 16–17 March.

16 March 2004	Braga (I)	1–3	Porto (I)	Estádio Primeiro de Maio, Braga
21:15	Vanzini 55'		Jankauskas 7', 52', 62'	Referee: Bruno Paixão

17 March 2004	Benfica (I)	3–1	Belenenses (I)	Estádio da Luz, Lisbon
20:45	Šokota 7', 9'; Tiago 35'		Rosário 51'	Referee: João Ferreira

== Final ==
16 May 2004
17:15 WEST

Benfica	2–1 (a.e.t.)	Porto
Fyssas 58'; Simão 104'		Derlei 45'

Estádio Nacional, Oeiras
Attendance: 38,000
Referee: Lucílio Batista (Setúbal)
