= 2006–07 Taça de Portugal =

Tournament details
- Country: Portugal
- Dates: 3 September 2006 – 27 May 2007
- Teams: 214

Final positions
- Champions: Sporting CP (14th title)
- Runners-up: Belenenses

Tournament statistics
- Matches played: 211
- Goals scored: 592 (2.81 per match)
- Top goal scorer(s): Liédson (6 goals)

The 2006–07 Taça de Portugal was the 67th edition of the Portuguese football knockout tournament, organized by the Portuguese Football Federation (FPF). The 2006–07 Taça de Portugal began on 3 September 2006. The final was played on 27 May 2007 at the Estádio Nacional.

Porto were the previous holders, having defeated Vitória de Setúbal 1–0 in the previous season's final. Porto was not able to regain their title as they were defeated by Atlético CP in the fourth round. Sporting CP defeated Belenenses 1–0 in the final to win their 14th Taça de Portugal. By winning the Taça de Portugal, Sporting CP qualified for the 2007 Supertaça Cândido de Oliveira.

== Format and schedule ==
Round	Date(s)	Clubs entering this round	Clubs from the previous round	Clubs involved	Fixtures
First round ^{1}	3 September 2006	127 clubs competing in the Terceira Divisão and Portuguese District Leagues	none	127	60
Second round ^{2}	24 September 2006	54 clubs competing in the Portuguese Second Division	60 winners from the first round	122	56
Third round	11–12 November 2006	16 clubs competing in the Liga de Honra	56 winners from the second round	81	40
Fourth round	21 December 2006; 6–7 January 2007	16 clubs competing in the Primeira Liga	40 winners from third round	57	28
Fifth round	21 January 2007	none	28 winners from fourth round	27	13
Sixth round	10 February 2007	none	13 winners from fifth round	15	7
Quarter-finals	28 February 2006; 25 March 2007	none	7 winners from sixth round	8	4
Semi-finals	18–19 April 2007	none	4 winners from the quarterfinals	4	2
Final	27 May 2007	none	2 winners from the semifinals	2	1

- ^1 One Hundred and three of the one hundred and four teams who participated in the 2006–07 Terceira Divisão, played in this round. Vitória Setúbal B was unable to compete in the domestic cup competition due to the possibility of encountering their senior side in the competition. Queluz also did not participate.
- ^2 Fifty four of the fifty six teams who participated in the 2006–07 Segunda Divisão, played in this round. Marítimo B was unable to compete in the domestic cup competition due to the possibility of encountering their senior side in the competition. Queluz also did not participate.

== Teams ==
=== Primeira Liga ===
- Académica de Coimbra
- Beira-Mar
- Belenenses
- Benfica
- Boavista
- Braga
- Desportivo das Aves
- Estrela da Amadora
- Marítimo
- Nacional
- Naval
- Paços de Ferreira
- Porto
- Sporting CP
- União de Leiria
- Vitória de Setúbal

=== Liga de Honra ===
- Chaves
- Estoril
- Feirense
- Gil Vicente
- Gondomar
- Leixões
- Olhanense
- Olivais e Moscavide
- Penafiel
- Portimonense
- Rio Ave
- Santa Clara
- Trofense
- Varzim
- Vitória de Guimarães
- Vizela

=== Second Division ===
Série A

- Bragança
- Fafe
- Famalicão
- Freamunde
- Lixa
- Lousada
- Maia
- Maria da Fonte
- Moreirense
- Pontassolense
- Ribeira Brava
- Ribeirão
- Vila Meã

Série B

- Camacha
- Dragões Sandinenses
- Esmoriz
- Fiães
- Infesta
- Lourosa
- Machico
- Marco
- Oliveirense
- Paredes
- Portosantense
- Sporting de Espinho
- União da Madeira
- União de Lamas

Série C

- Avanca
- Fátima
- Lusitânia
- Madalena
- Mirandense
- Nelas
- Oliveira do Bairro
- Operário
- Pampilhosa
- Penalva do Castelo
- Portomosense
- Sporting da Covilhã
- Sporting de Pombal
- Tourizense

Série D

- Abrantes
- Atlético CP
- Barreirense
- Eléctrico
- Estrela de Vendas Novas
- Imortal
- Louletano
- Mafra
- Messinense
- Odivelas
- Pinhalnovense
- Rio Maior
- Torreense

=== Third Division ===
Série A

- Amares
- Brito
- Cabeceirense
- Cerveira
- Joane
- Limianos
- Macedo de Cavaleiros
- Marinhas
- Merelinense
- Mirandela
- Mondinense
- União Torcatense
- Valdevez
- Vianense
- Vilaverdense
- Vieira

Série B

- AD Oliveirense
- Aliados Lordelo
- Alijoense
- Amarante
- Ataense
- Canedo
- Ermesinde
- Leça
- Oliveira do Douro
- Pedras Rubras
- Rebordosa
- São Pedro da Cova
- Tirsense
- Torre de Moncorvo
- Vila Real
- Vilanovense

Série C

- AD Valonguense
- Águeda
- Anadia
- Gafanha
- Milheiroense
- Oliveira do Hospital
- Paços de Brandão
- Sanjoanense
- Santacombadense
- São João de Ver
- Sátão
- Social Lamas
- Tocha
- Tondela
- Valecambrense

Série D

- Alcobaça
- Atlético Riachense
- Benfica Castelo Branco
- Bidoeirense
- Bombarralense
- Caldas
- Caranguejeira
- Gândara
- Idanhense
- Marinhense
- Monsanto
- Penamacorense
- Peniche
- Sertanense
- Sourense
- União de Coimbra

Série E

- 1º de Dezembro
- Alcochetense
- Atlético do Cacém
- Atlético Povoense
- Câmara de Lobos
- Caniçal
- Cartaxo
- Carregado
- Casa Pia
- Lourel
- Montijo
- O Elvas
- Oeiras
- Oriental
- Santana
- Sintrense

Série F

- Almancilense
- Amora
- Atlético do Reguengos
- Beira-Mar de Monte Gordo
- Campinense
- Cova da Piedade
- Desportivo de Beja
- Ferreiras
- Juventude Évora
- Lagoa
- Lusitano de Évora
- Lusitano VRSA
- Serpa
- Silves

Série Azores

- Angrense
- Capelense
- Fayal
- Marítimo Graciosa
- Marítimo Velense
- Praiense
- Santiago
- Santo António
- União Micaelense
- Vitória do Pico

=== District Leagues ===
- Aguiar da Beira
- Águias do Moradal
- Armacenenses
- Boavista de São Mateus
- Bougadense
- Canas Senhorim
- Carregosense
- CF Vasco da Gama
- Desportivo de Beja
- Fazendense
- Ferreiras
- Lousanense
- Mãe d'Água
- Monfortense
- Neves
- Oriolenses
- Pedras Salgadas
- Ponterrolense
- Porto Moniz
- Pescadores
- Seia
- Serzedelo
- União da Serra
- União do Nordeste

== First round ==
For the first round draw, teams were drawn against each other in accordance to their geographical location. The draw was split up into four sections: teams from the north, the center, the south and the Azores region. The draw for the first round took place on 8 August. All first round cup ties were played on 3 September. Due to the odd number of teams involved at this stage of the competition, 1º de Dezembro, Canedo, Cartaxo, Lajense, Macedo de Cavaleiros, Penamacorense and União da Serra progressed to the next round. Vasco da Gama AC were scheduled to play Casa Pia, but forfeited their match due to the club folding at the beginning of the 2006–07 season. The first round of the cup saw teams from the Terceira Divisão (IV) start the competition alongside some teams who registered to participate in the cup from the Portuguese District Leagues (V).

=== North Zone ===
Home team	Score	Away team
AD Oliveirense (IV)	3–2 (aet)	São Pedro da Cova (IV)
Aliados Lordelo (IV)	2–1	Limianos (IV)
Alijoense (IV)	1–3	Leça (IV)
Bougadense (V)	1–0	Mondinense (IV)
Canas Senhorim (V)	0–4	Cerveira (IV)
Ermesinde (IV)	1–1 (aet, p. 2–4)	Serzedelo (V)
Joane (IV)	1–0	Amarante (IV)
Marinhas (IV)	6–0	Mãe d'Água (V)
Merelinense (IV)	5–0	Vilaverdense (IV)

Home team	Score	Away team
Mirandela (IV)	2–1	Vieira (IV)
Neves (V)	0–0 (aet, p. 4–3)	Brito (IV)
Oliveira do Douro (IV)	1–0	Pedras Rubras (IV)
Pedras Salgadas (V)	2–3 (aet)	Amares (IV)
Rebordosa (IV)	3–1	Vianense (IV)
Tirsense (IV)	5–0	Cabeceirense (IV)
União Torcatense (IV)	2–2 (aet, p. 4–1)	Torre de Moncorvo (IV)
Valdevez (IV)	3–0	Vila Real (IV)
Vilanovense (IV)	WO	Ataense (IV)

=== Central Zone ===
Home team	Score	Away team
AD Valonguense (IV)	1–0	Caldas (IV)
Alcobaça (IV)	3–0	Aguiar da Beira (V)
Atlético Riachense (IV)	4–1	Águias do Moradal (V)
Bidoeirense (IV)	1–1 (aet, p. 5–4)	Benfica Castelo Branco (IV)
Caranguejeira (IV)	3–1	Oliveira do Hospital (IV)
Carregosense (V)	0–0 (aet, p. 4–3)	Águeda (IV)
Fazendense (V)	0–1	Paços de Brandão (IV)
Gafanha (IV)	1–1 (aet, p. 5–4)	Monsanto (IV)
Gândara (IV)	0–2	Marinhense (IV)

Home team	Score	Away team
Peniche (IV)	3–2	Santacombadense (IV)
Sanjoanense (IV)	1–0	São João de Ver (IV)
Sátão (IV)	1–0	Lousanense (V)
Sertanense (IV)	1–0	Anadia (IV)
Social Lamas (IV)	2–1	Bombarralense (IV)
Tocha (IV)	5–5 (aet, p. 3–2)	Milheiroense (IV)
Tondela (IV)	0–2	Sourense (IV)
União de Coimbra (IV)	WO	Seia (V)
Valecambrense (IV)	2–1	Idanhense (IV)

=== South Zone ===
Home team	Score	Away team
Almancilense (IV)	3–1 (aet)	Campinense (IV)
Amora (IV)	1–1 (aet, p. 4–3)	Lusitano de Évora (IV)
Atlético do Cacém (IV)	4–0	Armacenenses (V)
Atlético do Povoense (IV)	5–1	Oriolenses (V)
Atlético do Reguengos (IV)	1–2	Ferreiras (V)
Beira-Mar de Monte Gordo (IV)	3–1	Pescadores (V)
Câmara de Lobos (IV)	0–1	Silves (IV)
Casa Pia (IV)	WO	Vasco da Gama AC (N/A)
CF Vasco da Gama (V)	2–2 (aet, p. 5–4)	Lusitano VRSA (IV)

Home team	Score	Away team
Cova da Piedade (IV)	0–1	Santana (IV)
Juventude Évora (IV)	3–1	Montijo (IV)
Lagoa (IV)	5–1 (aet)	Carregado (IV)
Monfortense (V)	1–2 (aet)	Caniçal (IV)
O Elvas (IV)	1–2	Serpa (IV)
Oeiras (IV)	2–0	Alcochetense (IV)
Oriental (IV)	2–0	Desportivo de Beja (V)
Porto Moniz (V)	3–2 (aet, p. 5–3)	Ponterrolense (V)
Sintrense (IV)	5–1	Lourel (IV)

=== Azores Zone ===
Home team	Score	Away team
Capelense (IV)	2–0	Boavista de São Mateus (V)
Marítimo Graciosa (IV)	1–0	Vitória do Pico (IV)
Marítimo Velense (IV)	3–1	Santo António (IV)

Home team	Score	Away team
Praiense (IV)	3–2 (aet)	Angrense (IV)
Santiago (IV)	1–0	União Micaelense (IV)
União do Nordeste (V)	1–1 (aet, p. 2–4)	Fayal (IV)

== Second round ==
The draw for the second round took place on 11 September. All second round ties were played on 24 September. Due to the odd number of teams at this stage of the competition, Avanca, Bougadense, Imortal, Louletano, Maria da Fonte, Marítimo Graciosa, Oliveira do Bairro, Paços de Brandão, Paredes and Tourizense progressed to the next round. The second round saw teams from the Portuguese Second Division (III) enter the competition.

=== Série A ===
Home team	Score	Away team
AD Oliveirense (IV)	3–0	Tirsense (IV)
Amares (IV)	0–1	Lousada (III)
Ataense (IV)	2–1	Vila Meã (III)
Cerveira (IV)	1–3	Joane (IV)
Fafe (III)	2–3	Macedo de Cavaleiros (IV)
Freamunde (III)	0–1	Valdevez (IV)
Maia (III)	0–0 (aet, p. 3–2)	Lixa (III)
Marinhas (IV)	0–1	Mirandela (IV)

Home team	Score	Away team
Merelinense (IV)	0–2	Leça (IV)
Moreirense (III)	1–0	Aliados Lordelo (IV)
Oliveira do Douro (IV)	0–1	Pontassolense (III)
Ribeira Brava (III)	1–2	Bragança (III)
Ribeirão (III)	2–1	Neves (V)
Serzedelo (V)	1–2	Famalicão (III)
União Torcatense (IV)	1–1 (aet, p. 2–3)	Rebordosa (IV)

=== Série B ===
Home team	Score	Away team
Dragões Sandinenses (III)	0–1	Camacha (III)
Esmoriz (III)	1–0 (aet)	Portosantense (III)
Gafanha (IV)	0–2	Valecambrense (IV)
Lusitânia Lourosa (III)	3–0	Infesta (III)
Machico (III)	3–3 (aet, p. 4–2)	Fiães (III)
Marco (III)	2–1	Canedo (IV)

Home team	Score	Away team
Oliveirense (III)	3–0	Sanjoanense (IV)
Santana (IV)	2–0	Porto Moniz (V)
Sporting de Espinho (III)	2–1	Carregosense (V)
União da Madeira (III)	3–0	Caniçal (IV)
União de Lamas (III)	2–0	UD Valonguense (V)

=== Série C ===
Home team	Score	Away team
Alcobaça (IV)	6–0	Lajense (V)
Capelense (IV)	5–3	Penamacorense (IV)
Caranguejeira (IV)	0–1	Sátão (IV)
Fátima (III)	0–3	Penalva do Castelo (III)
Madalena (III)	3–0	Praiense (IV)
Nelas (III)	1–2	Lusitânia (III)
Peniche (IV)	1–2 (aet)	Pampilhosa (III)
Portomosense (III)	1–1 (aet, p. 8–9)	Tocha (IV)

Home team	Score	Away team
Santiago (IV)	3–2 (aet)	Social Lamas (IV)
Sertanense (IV)	5–2	Marítimo Velense (IV)
Sourense (IV)	2–0	Fayal (IV)
Sporting da Covilhã (III)	4–0	Mirandense (III)
Sporting de Pombal (III)	0–0 (aet, p. 4–2)	Marinhense (IV)
União da Serra (V)	2–2 (aet, p. 5–3)	Bidoeirense (IV)
União de Coimbra (IV)	2–3 (aet)	Operário (III)

=== Série D ===
Home team	Score	Away team
Amora (IV)	1–2	1º de Dezembro (IV)
Atlético CP (III)	5–0	Serpa (IV)
Barreirense (III)	2–0	CF Vasco da Gama (V)
Beira-Mar de Monte Gordo (IV)	2–0	Silves (IV)
Ferreiras (IV)	2–2 (aet, p. 4–2)	Atlético Riachense (IV)
Cartaxo (IV)	1–2	Casa Pia (IV)
Lagoa (IV)	3–1	Oeiras (IV)
Juventude Évora (IV)	1–0	Abrantes (III)

Home team	Score	Away team
Mafra (III)	3–2	Atlético do Cacém (IV)
Messinense (III)	0–2	Pinhalnovense (III)
Odivelas (III)	0–0 (aet, p. 6–5)	Real (III)
Oriental (IV)	2–2 (aet, p. 2–3)	Eléctrico (III)
Rio Maior (III)	2–0	Atlético Povoense (IV)
Sintrense (IV)	1–0	Estrela de Vendas Novas (III)
Torreense (III)	2–0	Almancilense (IV)

== Third round ==
The draw for the third round took place on 30 October. The majority of the third round ties were played on 11 November. Due to the odd number of teams in the competition, Casa Pia progressed to the next round due to having no opponent to face at this stage of the competition. The third round saw teams from the Liga de Honra (II) enter the competition.

Home team	Score	Away team
Avanca (III)	0–2	Gondomar (II)
Bragança (III)	3–2 (aet)	Imortal (III)
Camacha (III)	4–0	Alcobaça (IV)
Capelense (IV)	0–3	Portimonense (II)
Esmoriz (III)	0–1	Pontassolense (III)
Joane (IV)	1–1 (aet, p. 1–3)	Louletano (III)
Juventude Évora (IV)	2–2 (aet, p. 4–3)	Pampilhosa (III)
Lagoa (IV)	4–0	União da Serra (V)
Leixões (II)	1–0	Ribeirão (III)
Lourosa (III)	0–2	Famalicão (III)
Lusitânia (III)	2–0	Chaves (II)
Mafra (III)	2–1	Vitória de Guimarães (II)
Maia (III)	1–0	Madalena (III)
Marco (III)	1–0	Lousada (III)
Maria da Fonte (III)	3–0	Bougadense (V)
Mirandela (IV)	2–2 (aet, p. 4–5)	Feirense (II)
Odivelas (III)	2–1	Ataense (IV)
Olivais e Moscavide (II)	1–0	Tocha (IV)
Operário (III)	0–1	Rio Ave (II)
Penalva do Castelo (V)	2–0 (aet)	1º de Dezembro (IV)

Home team	Score	Away team
Pinhalnovense (III)	4–1	Paços de Brandão (IV)
Rebordosa (IV)	1–3 (aet)	Macedo de Cavaleiros (IV)
Santa Clara (II)	3–1	Beira-Mar de Monte Gordo (IV)
Sátão (IV)	0–0 (aet, p. 2–4)	Olhanense (II)
Sertanense (IV)	3–2 (aet)	Barreirense (III)
Sintrense (IV)	0–1	Estoril (II)
Sourense (IV)	1–2	Santiago (IV)
Sporting da Covilhã (III)	1–0	Tourizense (III)
Sporting de Espinho (III)	2–1	Eléctrico (III)
Torreense (III)	1–1 (aet, p. 2–4)	Atlético CP (IV)
Trofense (II)	0–1	Rio Maior (III)
União da Madeira (III)	5–1	Machico (III)
União de Lamas (III)	1–1 (aet, p. 2–4)	Santana (IV)
Valdevez (IV)	0–1	Paredes (III)
Vizela (II)	1–0	Sporting de Pombal III)
Oliveira do Bairro (III)	1–1 (aet, p. 5–4)	Oliveirense (III)
Ferreiras (IV)	0–1	AD Oliveirense (IV)
Moreirense (III)	1–1 (aet, p. 4–5)	Valecambrense (IV)
Marítimo Graciosa (IV)	0–1	Penafiel (II)
Varzim (II)	3–1	Leça (IV)

== Fourth round ==
The draw for the fourth round took place on 28 November. Sporting CP's cup tie against União da Madeira was played on 21 December, whilst Benfica's tie against Oliveira do Bairro was played on 6 January. The remainder of the ties were played on 7 January. Due to the odd number of teams in the competition, Rio Ave progressed to the next round due to having no opponent to face at this stage of the competition. The fourth round saw teams from the Primeira Liga (I) enter the competition.

Home team	Score	Away team
União da Madeira (III)	1–3	Sporting CP (I)
Benfica (I)	5–0	Oliveira do Bairro (III)
Porto (I)	0–1	Atlético CP (III)
Bragança (III)	4–2	Marco (III)
Gondomar (II)	3–0	Rio Maior (III)
Leixões (II)	2–1 (aet)	Famalicão (III)
Paredes (III)	2–4 (aet)	Belenenses (I)
Penalva do Castelo (III)	2–1	Maria da Fonte (III)
Santiago (IV)	0–1	Odivelas (III)
Valecambrense (III)	2–4	Varzim (II)
Beira-Mar (I)	6–0	Santana (IV)
Boavista (I)	3–1	Macedo de Cavaleiros (IV)
Camacha (III)	1–0	Olhanense (II)
Desportivo das Aves (I)	1–0	Oliveirense (III)

Home team	Score	Away team
Estoril (II)	1–1 (aet, p. 3–4)	Santa Clara (II)
Estrela da Amadora (I)	2–1 (aet)	Feirense (II)
Juventude Évora (IV)	1–4	Pinhalnovense (III)
Louletano (III)	1–0	Sporting de Espinho (III)
Maia (III)	2–0	Lagoa (IV)
Nacional (I)	3–0	Vizela (II)
Penafiel (II)	1–0	Marítimo (I)
Pontassolense (III)	2–1	Olivais e Moscavide (II)
Naval (I)	4–0	Casa Pia (IV)
Sertanense (IV)	1–0	Lusitânia (III)
Sporting da Covilhã (III)	0–1	Mafra (III)
Académica de Coimbra (I)	2–1	Vitória de Setúbal (I)
Braga (I)	5–2	Portimonense (II)
Paços de Ferreira (I)	1–2	União de Leiria (I)

== Fifth round ==
The draw for the fourth round took place on 9 January. All of the cup ties were played on 21 January. Due to the odd number of participants in the competition, Bragança progressed to the next round due to having no opponent to face at this stage of the competition.

21 January 2007	Atlético CP (III)	1–0	Santa Clara (II)	Estádio da Tapadinha, Lisbon
14:00	Artur Jorge 85' (.pen)			Referee: Rui Costa

21 January 2007	Gondomar (II)	1–4	Belenenses (I)	Estádio de São Miguel, Gondomar
14:30	Maciel 16'		Roma 16'; Amorim 24'; Silas 34'; Eliseu 90'	Referee: Elmano Santos

21 January 2007	Odivelas (III)	3–1	Mafra (III)	Estádio Arnaldo Dias, Odivelas
14:30	Varão 65' (.pen); Semedo 78'; Hélder Costa 90+1'		Rui Mendes 21'	Referee: Hugo Faria

21 January 2007	Leixões (III)	1–2	Académica de Coimbra (I)	Estádio do Mar, Matosinhos
14:30	Élvis 59'		N'Doye 14'; Miguel Pedro 25'	Referee: Duarte Gomes

21 January 2007	Beira–Mar (I)	4–2	Louletano (III)	Estádio Municipal de Aveiro, Aveiro
15:00	Rui Lima 6' (.pen), 58' (.pen), 78' (.pen); Roma 8'		Clemente 48', 59'	Referee: Carlos Duarte

21 January 2007	Boavista (I)	3–1	Penalva do Castelo (III)	Estádio do Bessa, Porto
15:00	Cissé 17'; Faye 21', 77'		Listra 53' (.pen)	Referee: Hugo Miguel

21 January 2007	Estrela da Amadora (I)	0–1	Naval (I)	Estádio José Gomes, Amadora
15:00			Gilmar 22'	Referee: Vasco Santos

21 January 2007	Pinhalnovense (III)	2–0	Camacha (III)	Campo de Jogos Santos Jorge, Pinhal Novo
15:00	Rodrigo 1'; Regueira 67'			Referee: Ivo Santos

21 January 2007	Maia (III)	1–0	Desportivo das Aves (I)	Estádio Professor Doutor Vieira de Carvalho, Maia
15:00	Castro 90+3'			Referee: Paulo Baptista

21 January 2007	Braga (I)	2–1	Pontassolense (III)	Estádio Municipal de Braga, Braga
16:00	Zé Carlos 18'; João Pinto 60'		Pires 32'	Referee: Olegário Benquerença

21 January 2007	Varzim (II)	3–1 (a.e.t.)	Sertanense (IV)	Estádio do Varzim Sport Club, Póvoa de Varzim
16:00	Roberto 9'; Denilson 116'; Emanuel 120'		Bruno Miguel 31' (o.g.)	Referee: Rui Silva

21 January 2007	Sporting CP (I)	2–1	Rio Ave (II)	Estádio José Alvalade, Lisbon
17:00	Ricardo Jorge 20' (o.g.); Liédson 30'		Keita 75'	Attendance: 14,604; Referee: Nuno Almeida

21 January 2007	Nacional (I)	0–0 (a.e.t.) (7–6 p)	Penafiel (II)	Estádio da Madeira, Madeira
17:00				Referee: Carlos Xistra

== Sixth round ==
Ties were played on 10 February. Due to the odd number of participants involved in the 2006–07 Taça de Portugal, Braga qualified for the quarter finals due to having no opponent to face at this stage of the competition.

10 February 2007	Atlético CP (III)	0–1	Académica de Coimbra (I)	Estádio da Tapadinha, Lisbon
14:30			Pitbull 89'	Referee: Augusto Duarte

10 February 2007	Odivelas (III)	0–1	Belenenses (I)	Estádio Arnaldo Dias, Odivelas
14:30			Garcés 63'	Referee: Hélio Santos

10 February 2007	Pinhalnovense (III)	0–6	Sporting CP (I)	Estádio Alfredo da Silva, Pinhal Novo
14:30			Liédson 1', 39'; Custódio 12'; Bueno 27', 85'; Custódio 76'	Referee: Paulo Paraty

10 February 2007	Boavista(I)	2–0	Nacional (I)	Estádio do Bessa, Porto
15:00	Hugo Monteiro 7'; Grzelak 90'			Referee: Pedro Proença

10 February 2007	Maia (III)	0–2	Beira–Mar (I)	Estádio Professor Doutor Vieira de Carvalho, Maia
15:00			Edgar 21'; Delibašić 30'	Referee: Rui Silva

10 February 2007	Naval (I)	0–1	Bragança (III)	Estádio Municipal José Bento Pessoa, Figueira da Foz
15:00			Mobil 21'	Referee: João Vilas Boas

10 February 2007	Varzim (II)	2–1	Benfica (I)	Estádio do Varzim Sport Club, Póvoa de Varzim
20:30	Nélson 13' (o.g.); Mendonça 77'		Simão 30'	Referee: Olegário Benquerença

== Quarter-finals ==
Three of the cup ties were played on 28 February, whilst Braga's game against Varzim was played on 25 March.

28 February 2007	Bragança (III)	1–2	Belenenses (I)	Municipal de Bragança, Bragança
14:30	Tony 27'		Dady 57'; Nivaldo 71'	Referee: Jorge Sousa

28 February 2007	Beira–Mar (I)	2–0 (a.e.t.)	Boavista (I)	Estádio Municipal de Aveiro, Aveiro
19:00	Edgar 112'; Delibašić 120'			Attendance: 1,857; Referee: Olegário Benquerença

28 February 2007	Sporting CP (I)	2–1	Académica de Coimbra (I)	Estádio José Alvalade, Lisbon
21:00	Liédson 5', 10'		N'Doye 90+1'	Attendance: 13,018; Referee: Jorge Sousa

25 March 2007	Braga (I)	2–0	Varzim (II)	Estádio Municipal de Braga, Braga
18:00	Maciel 33', 67'			Attendance: 8,151; Referee: João Ferreira

== Semi-finals ==
Ties were played on 18–19 April. All four semi-finalists were from the Primeira Liga.

18 April 2007	Sporting CP (I)	2–1	Beira–Mar (I)	Estádio José Alvalade, Lisbon
21:00	Moutinho 6', 8'		Diarra 47'	Attendance: 21,894; Referee: Paulo Paraty

19 April 2007	Belenenses (I)	2–1 (a.e.t.)	Braga (I)	Estádio do Restelo, Lisbon
21:00	Dady 5'; José Pedro 105' (pen.)		Maciel 34'	Referee: Jorge Sousa

== Final ==
27 May 2007
17:00 WEST

Belenenses	0–1	Sporting CP
		Liédson 87'

Estádio Nacional, Oeiras
Attendance: 37,000
Referee: Pedro Proença (Lisbon)
