= 2004–05 Taça de Portugal =

Tournament details
- Country: Portugal
- Dates: 5 September 2004 – 29 May 2005
- Teams: 229

Final positions
- Champions: Vitória de Setúbal (3rd title)
- Runners-up: Benfica

Tournament statistics
- Matches played: 230
- Goals scored: 753 (3.27 per match)
- Top goal scorer(s): Albert Meyong; Bruno Moraes; Geovanni (4 goals each)

The 2004–05 Taça de Portugal was the 65th edition of the Portuguese football knockout tournament, organized by the Portuguese Football Federation (FPF). The 2004–05 Taça de Portugal began on 5 September 2004. The final was played on 29 May 2005 at the Estádio Nacional.

Benfica were the previous holders, having defeated Porto 2–1 in the previous season's final. Vitória de Setúbal defeated holders Benfica, 2–1 in the final to win their third Taça de Portugal. By virtue of their victory in the final, Vitória qualified for the 2005–06 UEFA Cup first round. They would also qualify for the 2005 Supertaça Cândido de Oliveira.

== Format and schedule ==
| Round | Date(s) | Clubs entering this round | Clubs from the previous round | Clubs involved | Fixtures |
|---|---|---|---|---|---|
| First round ^{[1]} | 5–15 September 2004 | 138 clubs competing in the Terceira Divisão and Portuguese District Leagues | none | 138 | 69 |
| Second round ^{[2]} | 19 September–5 October 2004 | 56 clubs competing in the Portuguese Second Division | 69 winners from the first round | 126 | 63 |
| Third round | 5–13 October 2004 | 18 clubs competing in the Liga de Honra | 63 winners from the second round | 81 | 40 |
| Fourth round | 26–27 October 2004 | 18 clubs competing in the Primeira Liga | 40 winners from third round | 59 | 29 |
| Fifth round | 21–23 December 2004; 4–12 January 2005 | none | 29 winners from fourth round | 30 | 15 |
| Sixth round | 25–26 January 2005 | none | 15 winners from fifth round | 15 | 7 |
| Quarter-finals | 2–3 March 2005 | none | 7 winners from sixth round | 8 | 4 |
| Semi-finals | 19–20 April 2005 | none | 4 winners from the quarterfinals | 4 | 2 |
| Final | 29 May 2005 | none | 2 winners from the semifinals | 2 | 1 |

1. ^1 One hundred and six of the one hundred and eight teams competing in the 2004–05 Terceira Divisão, played in this round. Benfica B were unable to compete in the domestic cup competition due to the possibility of encountering their senior side in the competition. Queluz also did not participate.
2. ^2 Fifty six of the fifty nine teams competing in the 2004–05 Segunda Divisão, played in this round. Braga B, Marítimo B and Porto B were unable to compete in the domestic cup competition due to the possibility of encountering their senior side in the competition.

== Teams ==
=== Primeira Liga ===
- Académica de Coimbra
- Benfica
- Beira-Mar
- Belenenses
- Boavista
- Braga
- Estoril
- Gil Vicente
- Marítimo
- Moreirense
- Nacional
- Penafiel
- Porto
- Rio Ave
- Sporting CP
- União de Leiria
- Vitória de Guimarães
- Vitória de Setúbal

=== Liga de Honra ===
- Alverca
- Chaves
- Desportivo das Aves
- Estrela da Amadora
- Feirense
- Felgueiras
- Gondomar
- Leixões
- Maia
- Marco
- Naval
- Olhanense
- Ovarense
- Paços de Ferreira
- Portimonense
- Santa Clara
- Sporting de Espinho
- Varzim

=== Second Division ===
North Zone

- Dragões Sandinenses
- Fafe
- Fiães
- Freamunde
- Infesta
- Lixa
- Lousada
- Paredes
- Pedras Rubras
- Ribeirão
- Salgueiros
- Trofense
- União de Lamas
- Valdevez
- Valenciano
- Vilanovense
- Vilaverdense
- Vizela

Central Zone

- Abrantes
- Académico de Viseu
- Benfica Castelo Branco
- Caldas
- Esmoriz
- Estarreja
- Fátima
- Mafra
- Oliveira do Bairro
- Oliveira do Hospital
- Oliveirense
- Pampilhosa
- Penalva do Castelo
- Sanjoanense
- Sporting da Covilhã
- Sporting de Pombal
- Torreense
- Tourizense
- Vilafranquense

South Zone

- Amora
- Atlético CP
- Barreirense
- Camacha
- Casa Pia
- Estrela Vendas Novas
- Louletano
- Lusitânia
- Odivelas
- Olivais e Moscavide
- Operário
- Oriental
- Pinhalnovense
- Pontassolense
- Portosantense
- Ribeira Brava
- União da Madeira
- União Micaelense
- Vasco Gama AC

=== Third Division ===
Série A

- AD Oliveirense
- Bragança
- Cabeceirense
- Caçadores das Taipas
- Cerveira
- Dragões Sandinenses
- Esposende
- Joane
- Maria da Fonte
- Merelinense
- Mirandela
- Monção
- Neves
- Ponte da Barca
- Santa Maria
- União Torcatense
- Valpaços
- Vianense

Série B

- Aliados Lordelo
- Canedo
- Canelas
- Cinfães
- Ermesinde
- Famalicão
- Leça
- Mogadourense
- Padroense
- Pedrouços
- Rebordosa
- Rio Tinto
- Santa Marta de Penaguião
- São Pedro da Cova
- Tirsense
- Torre de Moncorvo
- UD Valonguense
- Vila Real

Série C

- Águeda
- Anadia
- Arrifanense
- Avanca
- Castro Daire
- Cesarense
- Gafanha
- Milheiroense
- Nelas
- Poiares
- Santacombadense
- São João de Ver
- Sátão
- Social Lamas
- Souropires
- Tocha
- União de Coimbra
- Valecambrense

Série D

- Águias do Moradal
- Atlético Riachense
- Beneditense
- Bidoeirense
- Caranguejeira
- Eléctrico
- Idanhense
- Marinhense
- Mirandense
- Monsanto
- Nazarenos
- Peniche
- Portomosense
- Rio Maior
- Sertanense
- Sourense
- Torres Novas
- Vieirense

Série E

- 1º de Dezembro
- Atlético do Cacém
- Câmara de Lobos
- Cartaxo
- Carregado
- Estrela da Calheta
- Fazendense
- Loures
- Lourinhanense
- Machico
- Malveira
- O Elvas
- Santana
- Sintrense
- União de Tires
- Vialonga

Série F

- Aljustrelense
- Almada
- Almancilense
- Beira-Mar de Monte Gordo
- Desportivo de Beja
- Farense
- Imortal
- Juventude de Évora
- Lagoa
- Lusitano de Évora
- Lusitano VRSA
- Messinense
- Moura
- Montijo
- Sesimbra
- Seixal
- Silves
- União Santiago

Série Azores

- Angrense
- Boavista Flores
- Capelense
- Madalena
- Minhocas
- Os Leões
- Praiense
- Santiago
- Santo António
- Velense

=== District Leagues ===
- Alvarães
- Amarante
- Boavista Ribeirinha
- Cerva
- Ericeirense
- Fayal
- Gouveia
- Guia
- Lourinhanense
- Macedo de Cavaleiros
- Marialvas
- Nisa e Benfica
- Oleiros
- Palmelense
- Rabo Peixe
- São Vicente
- Sporting de Cuba
- Terras de Bouro
- Tondela
- União da Serra
- União Figueirense
- União Montemor

== First round ==
For the first round draw, teams were drawn against each other in accordance to their geographical location. The draw was split up into four sections: teams from the north, the center, the south and the Azores region. All first round cup ties were played on the 5–15 September. Due to the odd number of teams at this stage of the competition, Angrense progressed to the next round due to having no opponent to face at this stage of the competition. The first round of the cup saw teams from the Terceira Divisão (IV) start the competition alongside some teams who registered to participate in the cup from the Portuguese District Leagues (V).

=== North Zone ===
| Home team | Score | Away team |
|---|---|---|
| Amarante (V) | 5–4 | Maria da Fonte (IV) |
| Bragança (IV) | 0–1 | UD Valonguense (IV) |
| Caçadores das Taipas (IV) | 1–0 | Mirandela (IV) |
| Cerva (V) | 1–2 (aet) | Tirsense (IV) |
| Cerveira (IV) | 3–0 | UD Valonguense (IV) |
| Cinfães (IV) | 1–3 (aet) | Joane (IV) |
| Ermesinde (IV) | 3–2 (aet) | Santa Maria (IV) |
| Esposende (IV) | 4–0 | Alvarães (V) |
| Leça (IV) | 2–1 (aet) | Dragões Sandinenses (IV) |
| Macedo de Cavaleiros (V) | WO | Canelas (IV) |
| Merelinense (IV) | 1–0 | Mogadourense (IV) |

| Home team | Score | Away team |
|---|---|---|
| Monção (IV) | 3–3 (aet, p. 1–4) | AD Oliveirense (IV) |
| Neves (IV) | 0–6 | Torre de Moncorvo (IV) |
| Padroense (IV) | 3–3 (aet, p. 3–4) | Canedo (IV) |
| Rebordosa (IV) | 1–2 | Aliados Lordelo (IV) |
| Rio Tinto (IV) | 3–0 | Pedrouços (IV) |
| Santa Marta de Penaguião (IV) | 4–2 (aet) | União Torcatense (IV) |
| São Pedro da Cova (IV) | 2–1 | Ponte da Barca (IV) |
| Terras de Bouro (V) | WO | Cabeceirense (IV) |
| Valpaços (IV) | 1–3 | Famalicão (IV) |
| Vila Real (IV) | 3–5 (aet) | Vianense (IV) |

=== Central Zone ===
| Home team | Score | Away team |
|---|---|---|
| Águeda (IV) | 3–0 | Poiares (IV) |
| Águias do Moradal (IV) | 0–2 | Rio Maior (IV) |
| Anadia (IV) | 4–1 | Marialvas (V) |
| Atlético Riachense (IV) | 3–3 (aet, p. 4–3) | União de Coimbra (IV) |
| Beneditense (IV) | 1–1 (aet, p. 3–4) | Portomosense (IV) |
| Cesarense (IV) | 2–1 | Sourense (IV) |
| Eléctrico (IV) | 0–2 | Monsanto (IV) |
| Gafanha (IV) | 1–0 | Bidoeirense (IV) |
| Idanhense (IV) | 4–2 | São João de Ver (IV) |
| Mirandense (IV) | 4–2 | Caranguejeira (IV) |
| Nelas (IV) | 4–2 | Milheiroense (IV) |

| Home team | Score | Away team |
|---|---|---|
| Santacombadense (IV) | 0–2 | Castro Daire (IV) |
| Sertanense (IV) | 0–2 | Nazarenos (IV) |
| Social Lamas (IV) | 7–0 | Oleiros (V) |
| Souropires (IV) | 2–2 (aet, p. 6–5) | Peniche (IV) |
| Tocha (IV) | 6–0 | Gouveia (V) |
| Tondela (V) | 0–1 | Torres Novas (IV) |
| União Figueirense (V) | 1–3 | Avanca (IV) |
| União da Serra (V) | 2–0 (aet) | Marinhense (IV) |
| Valecambrense (IV) | 2–0 | Arrifanense (IV) |
| Vieirense (IV) | 0–2 | Sátão (IV) |

=== South Zone ===
| Home team | Score | Away team |
|---|---|---|
| 1º de Dezembro (IV) | 0–0 (aet, p. 3–2) | Lagoa (IV) |
| Aljustrelense (IV) | 1–0 | Lusitano VRSA (IV) |
| Almancilense (IV) | 1–0 | Desportivo de Beja (IV) |
| Atlético do Cacém (IV) | 3–1 | Ericeirense (V) |
| Beira-Mar de Monte Gordo (IV) | 2–1 | Lourinhanense (V) |
| Farense (IV) | 1–5 | Lusitano de Évora (IV) |
| Juventude de Évora (IV) | 5–1 | União de Tires (IV) |
| Guia (V) | 1–2 | Sintrense (IV) |
| Imortal (IV) | 4–1 | Palmelense (V) |
| Malveira (IV) | 3–0 | São Vicente (V) |
| Montijo (IV) | 1–3 | Loures (IV) |

| Home team | Score | Away team |
|---|---|---|
| Moura (IV) | 2–1 | Fazendense (IV) |
| Nisa e Benfica (V) | 0–2 | Almada (IV) |
| Real (IV) | 2–0 | Câmara de Lobos (IV) |
| Santana (IV) | 3–1 | O Elvas (IV) |
| Seixal (IV) | 0–3 | Messinense (IV) |
| Sesimbra (IV) | 0–2 | Machico (IV) |
| Silves (IV) | 2–1 | União Montemor (V) |
| Sporting de Cuba (V) | 1–5 | Estrela da Calheta (IV) |
| União Santiago (IV) | 1–2 | Carregado (IV) |
| Vialonga (IV) | 4–3 | Cartaxo (IV) |

=== Azores Zone ===
| Home team | Score | Away team |
|---|---|---|
| Boavista Flores (IV) | 3–2 | Fayal (V) |
| Boavista Ribeirinha (V) | 1–0 (aet) | Rabo Peixe (V) |
| Madalena (IV) | 2–0 | Os Leões (IV) |

| Home team | Score | Away team |
|---|---|---|
| Minhocas (IV) | 0–2 | Santiago (IV) |
| Praiense (IV) | 1–1 (aet, p. 1–4) | Santo António (IV) |
| Velense (IV) | 4–1 | Capelense (IV) |

== Second round ==
Ties were played between the 19 September and 5 October. The second round saw teams from the Portuguese Second Division (III) enter the competition.

| Home team | Score | Away team |
|---|---|---|
| Abrantes (III) | 2–0 | Estarreja (III) |
| Académico de Viseu (III) | 2–0 (aet) | Portomosense (IV) |
| Aliados Lordelo (IV) | 1–0 | Vilaverdense (III) |
| Aljustrelense (IV) | 2–0 | Lusitânia (III) |
| Almada (IV) | 1–0 | Portosantense (III) |
| Amora (III) | 3–0 | Boavista Ribeirinha (V) |
| Anadia (IV) | 2–1 (aet) | Atlético Riachense (IV) |
| Angrense (IV) | 3–1 | Boavista Flores (IV) |
| Atlético do Cacém (IV) | 0–1 | União da Madeira (III) |
| Avanca (IV) | 1–1 (aet, p. 5–6) | Nazarenos (IV) |
| Beira-Mar de Monte Gordo (IV) | 1–2 | Sintrense (IV) |
| Benfica Castelo Branco (III) | 4–0 | Social Lamas (IV) |
| Caçadores das Taipas (IV) | 0–0 (aet, p. 6–7) | AD Oliveirense (IV) |
| Caldas (III) | 3–1 | Vilafranquense (III) |
| Camacha (III) | 4–1 | Atlético CP (III) |
| Canedo (IV) | 1–0 | Oliveira do Bairro (III) |
| Carregado (IV) | 1–1 (aet, p. 3–4) | Sporting de Pombal (III) |
| Casa Pia (III) | 1–1 (aet, p. 5–4) | 1º de Dezembro (IV) |
| Cerveira (IV) | 2–1 | Valenciano (III) |
| Ermesinde (IV) | 2–2 (aet, p. 2–4) | Torre de Moncorvo (IV) |
| Esposende (IV) | 1–2 | Leça (IV) |
| Estrela da Calheta (IV) | 1–0 | Ribeira Brava (III) |
| Estrela Vendas Novas (III) | 1–2 (aet) | Imortal (IV) |
| Famalicão (IV) | 3–0 | Ribeirão (III) |
| Fátima (III) | 2–1 | Mafra (III) |
| Freamunde (III) | 1–1 (aet, p. 2–4) | Valdevez (III) |
| Idanhense (IV) | 2–1 | Monsanto (IV) |
| Infesta (III) | 4–0 | Amarante (V) |
| Lixa (III) | 1–0 | Joane (IV) |
| Louletano (IV) | 4–3 | Operário (III) |
| Loures (IV) | 1–4 | Pinhalnovense (III) |
| Machico (IV) | 0–1 | Olivais e Moscavide (III) |

| Home team | Score | Away team |
|---|---|---|
| Madalena (IV) | 3–1 | União Micaelense (III) |
| Moura (IV) | 1–3 | Almancilense (IV) |
| Merelinense (IV) | 2–1 | UD Valonguense (IV) |
| Messinense (IV) | 0–2 | Odivelas (III) |
| Nelas (IV) | 1–2 | Sporting da Covilhã (III) |
| Oliveira do Hospital (III) | 3–0 | Gafanha (IV) |
| Oliveirense (III) | 1–0 | Castro Daire (IV) |
| Oriental (III) | 1–1 (aet, p. 6–5) | Barreirense (III) |
| Pampilhosa (III) | 2–1 | Mirandense (IV) |
| Paredes (III) | 0–1 | Dragões Sandinenses (III) |
| Pedras Rubras (III) | 4–2 | Fafe (III) |
| Pontassolense (III) | 0–1 | Juventude de Évora (IV) |
| Real (IV) | 4–0 | Santiago (IV) |
| Rio Maior (IV) | 3–0 | Águeda (IV) |
| Rio Tinto (IV) | 0–1 | Fiães (III) |
| Sanjoanense (III) | 6–3 | Tocha (IV) |
| Santana (IV) | 4–0 | Santo António (IV) |
| Silves (IV) | 1–2 | Lusitano de Évora (IV) |
| Salgueiros (III) | 2–0 | Santa Marta de Penaguião (IV) |
| São Pedro da Cova (IV) | 2–3 | Lousada (III) |
| Souropires (IV) | 2–1 | Valecambrense (IV) |
| Torreense (III) | 1–1 (aet, p. 5–4) | Cesarense (IV) |
| Torres Novas (IV) | 2–0 | Sátão (IV) |
| Tourizense (III) | 0–0 (aet, p. 6–7) | Esmoriz (III) |
| Trofense (III) | 2–1 | Vizela (III) |
| União da Serra (V) | 2–2 (aet, p. 2–3) | Penalva do Castelo (III) |
| Vasco da Gama AC (III) | 0–3 | Vialonga (IV) |
| Velense (IV) | 3–5 | Malveira (IV) |
| Vianense (IV) | 4–0 | Tirsense (IV) |
| Cabeceirense (IV) | 1–2 | União de Lamas (III) |
| Macedo de Cavaleiros (V) | 2–3 (aet) | Vilanovense (III) |

== Third round ==
The draw for the third round took place on the 24 September. Ties were played on the 5–13 October. Due to the odd number of teams at this stage of the competition, Marco progressed to the next round due to having no opponent to face at this stage of the competition. The third round saw teams from the Liga de Honra (II) enter the competition.

| Home team | Score | Away team |
|---|---|---|
| Académico de Viseu (III) | 2–1 | Sporting da Covilhã (III) |
| Aliados Lordelo (IV) | 2–1 (aet) | Gondomar (II) |
| Alverca (II) | 1–0 | Abrantes (III) |
| Angrense (IV) | 1–1 (aet, p. 3–4) | Paços de Ferreira (II) |
| Benfica Castelo Branco (III) | 1–1 (aet, p. 4–5) | Fátima (III) |
| Caldas (III) | 1–3 | Sintrense (IV) |
| Canedo (IV) | 3–1 | Aljustrelense (IV) |
| Casa Pia (III) | 0–0 (aet, p. 3–4) | Imortal (IV) |
| Cerveira (IV) | 0–3 | Naval (II) |
| Chaves (II) | 4–0 | Amora (III) |
| Desportivo das Aves (II) | 4–1 (aet) | Portimonense (II) |
| Estrela da Calheta (IV) | 2–0 | Infesta (III) |
| Famalicão (IV) | 1–1 (aet, p. 1–3) | Sporting de Pombal (III) |
| Fiães (III) | 2–1 | Camacha (III) |
| Idanhense (IV) | 3–4 | Rio Maior (IV) |
| Leça (IV) | 3–1 | Esmoriz (III) |
| Lixa (III) | 1–3 (aet) | Anadia (IV) |
| Louletano (II) | 4–2 | Lusitano de Évora (IV) |
| Lousada (III) | 2–1 | Olhanense (II) |
| Madalena (IV) | 5–2 | Olivais e Moscavide (III) |

| Home team | Score | Away team |
|---|---|---|
| Maia (II) | 1–0 | Torre de Moncorvo (IV) |
| Malveira (IV) | 1–2 | Santa Clara (II) |
| Merelinense (IV) | 2–0 | União de Lamas (III) |
| Odivelas (III) | 1–0 | Trofense (III) |
| Oliveira do Hospital (III) | 4–2 (aet) | Juventude de Évora (IV) |
| Oliveirense (III) | 4–2 | Santana (IV) |
| Oriental (III) | 2–1 (aet) | Felgueiras (II) |
| Ovarense (II) | 0–1 | Estrela da Amadora (II) |
| Pampilhosa (III) | 3–1 | Penalva do Castelo (III) |
| Pinhalnovense (III) | 2–0 | Varzim (II) |
| Real (IV) | 4–3 | Torreense (III) |
| Salgueiros (III) | 0–1 | Nazarenos (IV) |
| Sanjoanense (III) | 3–1 | Dragões Sandinenses (III) |
| Souropires (IV) | 1–3 | Almancilense (IV) |
| Sporting de Espinho (II) | 3–1 | Almada (IV) |
| Torres Novas (IV) | 1–4 | AD Oliveirense IV) |
| União da Madeira (III) | 1–2 (aet) | Pedras Rubras (III) |
| Vialonga (IV) | 1–3 | Vianense (IV) |
| Leixões (II) | 4–2 | Feirense (II) |
| Valdevez (III) | 2–1 | Vilanovense (III) |

== Fourth round ==
The draw for the fourth round took place on the 11 October. All fourth round cup ties were played on the 26–27 October. Due to the odd number of teams at this stage of the competition, Belenenses progressed to the next round due to having no opponent to face at this stage of the competition. The fourth round saw teams from the Primeira Liga (I) enter the competition.

| Home team | Score | Away team |
|---|---|---|
| Naval (II) | 1–3 | Sporting CP (I) |
| Vitória de Guimarães (I) | 2–1 | Porto (I) |
| Madalena (IV) | 3–4 | União de Leiria (I) |
| Académico de Viseu (III) | 4–0 | Merelinense (IV) |
| AD Oliveirense (IV) | 1–0 | Anadia (IV) |
| Almancilense (IV) | 0–3 | Académica de Coimbra (I) |
| Alverca (II) | 0–1 | Boavista (I) |
| Braga (I) | 2–0 | Lousada (III) |
| Chaves (II) | 0–2 | Rio Ave (I) |
| Estoril (I) | 0–1 | Estrela da Amadora (II) |
| Estrela da Calheta (IV) | 0–2 | Pinhalnovense (III) |
| Fiães (I) | 3–1 | Sintrense (IV) |
| Imortal (IV) | 1–2 | Sporting de Pombal (III) |
| Leça (IV) | 0–0 (aet, p. 5–3) | Canedo (IV) |
| Leixões (II) | 2–3 (aet) | Louletano (III) |

| Home team | Score | Away team |
|---|---|---|
| Moreirense I) | 4–2 | Marco (II) |
| Nacional (I) | 1–1 (aet, p. 3–0) | Desportivo das Aves (II) |
| Odivelas (III) | 2–1 | Gil Vicente (I) |
| Oliveira do Hospital (III) | 3–3 (aet, p. 5–4) | Sanjoanense (III) |
| Pampilhosa (III) | 3–1 (aet) | Fátima (III) |
| Penafiel (I) | 9–0 | Nazarenos (IV) |
| Real (IV) | 0–5 | Marítimo (I) |
| Rio Maior (IV) | 1–3 (aet) | Maia (II) |
| Sporting de Espinho (II) | 1–0 | Santa Clara (II) |
| Valdevez (III) | 0–1 | Aliados Lordelo (IV) |
| Vianense (IV) | 4–2 | Oliveirense (III) |
| Vitória de Setúbal I) | 2–0 | Pedras Rubras (III) |
| Benfica I) | 3–1 | Oriental (III) |
| Paços de Ferreira II) | 1–2 (aet) | Beira-Mar (I) |

== Fifth round ==
Ties were played on the 21–23 December and 4–12 January.

| 21 December 2004 | Benfica (I) | 4–1 (a.e.t.) | AD Oliveirense (IV) | Estádio da Luz, Lisbon |
| 18:00 | Simão 50' (pen.); Cristiano 95' (o.g.); Šokota 111'; Geovanni 113' | | Fidalgo 25' | Referee: Bruno Paixão |

| 22 December 2004 | Oliveira do Hospital (III) | 2–1 | Moreirense (I) | Estádio Municipal de Oliveira do Hospital, Oliveira do Hospital |
| 14:30 | Bertinho 57'; Paulo Alves 66' | | Duarte 25' |

| 23 December 2004 | Vianense (III) | 1–3 | Boavista (I) | Estádio Doutor José de Matos, Viana do Castelo |
| 14:30 | Gil 87' | | Zé Manel 21'; João Pinto 25'; Valente 30' | Referee: Mário Mendes |

| 4 January 2005 | Sporting CP (I) | 4–1 | Pampilhosa (III) | Estádio José Alvalade, Lisbon |
| 14:30 | C. Martins 10'; Sá Pinto 23', 56'; Viana 66' | | Paíto 28' (o.g.) | Referee: Paulo Costa |

| 12 January 2005 | Odivelas (III) | 1–2 (a.e.t.) | Braga (I) | Estádio Arnaldo Dias, Odivelas |
| 14:30 | P. Pereira 44' | | Edinho 61', 106' |

| 12 January 2005 | Aliados Lordelo (IV) | 0–2 | Vitória de Guimarães (I) | Estádio Cidade de Lordelo, Paredes |
| 15:00 | | | Alex 70'; Assis 79' |

| 12 January 2005 | Estrela da Amadora (II) | 1–0 (a.e.t.) | Louletano (III) | Estádio José Gomes, Amadora |
| 15:00 | Hugo Luz 98' |

| 12 January 2005 | Beira-Mar (I) | 2–2 (a.e.t.) (4–3 p) | Sporting de Espinho (II) | Estádio Municipal de Aveiro, Aveiro |
| 15:00 | Kingsley 18'; Rui Lima 54' | | Júlio César 6'; Magano 71' | Referee: Paulo Paraty |
| | Penalties |
| | (penalty scored) (penalty scored) (penalty scored); Alcaraz (penalty missed); Rui Lima (penalty scored) | | (penalty scored) (penalty scored) (penalty scored); (penalty missed) Moisés; (penalty missed) M. Carlos |

| 12 January 2005 | Fiães (III) | 0–0 (a.e.t.) (1–4 p) | Marítimo (I) | Estádio do Bolhão, Fiães |
| 15:00 | | | | Referee: João Henriques |
| | Penalties |
| | (penalty scored); Zé Paulo (penalty missed); Manarte (penalty missed) | | Penalty scored |

| 12 January 2005 | Pinhalnovense (III) | 3–0 | Leça (IV) | Campo de Jogos Santos Jorge, Pinhal Novo |
| 15:00 | R. Gomes 44', 69'; André 85' |

| 12 January 2005 | Rio Ave (III) | 0–2 | Académica de Coimbra (IV) | Estádio do Rio Ave FC, Vila do Conde |
| 15:00 | | | Dário 39'; Luciano 50' |

| 12 January 2005 | União de Leiria (I) | 1–2 | Nacional (I) | Estádio Dr. Magalhães Pessoa, Leiria |
| 15:00 | Laranjeiro 30' | | Baiano 9'; Goulart 50' |

| 12 January 2005 | Académico de Viseu (III) | 1–3 | Vitória de Setúbal (I) | Estádio do Fontelo, Viseu |
| 18:00 | Cajú 90+5' | | Moraes 12'; Manuel José 69'; Jorginho 87' |

| 12 January 2005 | Penafiel (I) | 3–2 | Maia (II) | Estádio Municipal 25 de Abril, Penafiel |
| 18:30 | Roberto 12'; Wesley 66'; Sidney 82' | | Evandro 26'; Emerson 76' |

| 12 January 2005 | Belenenses (I) | 3–0 | Sporting de Pombal (III) | Estádio do Restelo, Lisbon |
| 19:00 | Antchouet 21'; Petrolina 35'; Catanha 68' |

== Sixth round ==
Ties were played on the 25–26 January. Due to the odd number of participants involved in the 2004–05 Taça de Portugal, Beira-Mar qualified for the quarter-finals due to having no opponent to face at this stage of the competition.

| 25 January 2005 | Nacional (I) | 3–4 (a.e.t.) | Boavista (I) | Estádio da Madeira, Madeira |
| 18:45 | Adriano 86'; Viveiros 107'; Nunes 119' | | Zé Manel 37'; Cafú 106'; Valente 115'; Lucas 117' |

| 26 January 2005 | Oliveira do Hospital (III) | 0–1 | Braga (I) | Estádio Municipal de Oliveira do Hospital, Oliveira do Hospital |
| 14:30 | | | Wender 46' |

| 26 January 2005 | Académica de Coimbra (I) | 1–2 | Marítimo (I) | Estádio Cidade de Coimbra, Coimbra |
| 15:00 | Gaúcho 75' | | Bibishkov 38'; Pena 80' |

| 26 January 2005 | Estrela da Amadora (II) | 1–0 | Penafiel (I) | Estádio José Gomes, Amadora |
| 15:00 | Quim Berto 90' (pen.) | (Report) |

| 26 January 2005 | Pinhalnovense (III) | 1–2 | Belenenses (I) | Campo de Jogos Santos Jorge, Pinhal Novo |
| 15:00 | Rui Ferreira 90' (o.g.) | | Amaral 26'; Rolando 72' |

| 26 January 2005 | Vitória de Setúbal (I) | 3–1 | Vitória de Guimarães (I) | Estádio do Bonfim, Setúbal |
| 15:00 | Jorginho 12', 81'; Moraes 58' | | Moreno 40' | Referee: Olegário Benquerença |

| 26 January 2005 | Benfica (I) | 3–3 (a.e.t.) (7–6 p) | Sporting CP (I) | Estádio da Luz, Lisbon |
| 19:00 | Geovanni 3', 22'; Simão 118' | | Viana 15'; Liédson 17'; Paíto 110' |
| | Penalties |
| | Petit (penalty scored); M. Fernandes (penalty scored); M. dos Santos (penalty scored); Nuno Gomes (penalty scored); Simão (penalty scored); Carlitos (penalty scored); Alcides (penalty scored) | | (penalty scored) Rochemback; (penalty scored) Tello; (penalty scored) Liédson; (penalty scored) Polga; (penalty scored) Sá Pinto; (penalty scored) Moutinho; (penalty missed) Garcia |

== Quarter-finals ==
All quarter-final ties were played on the 2–3 March.

| 2 March 2005 | Marítimo (I) | 0–2 | Boavista (I) | Estádio dos Barreiros, Madeira |
| 15:00 | | | Milhazes 3'; Zé Manel 89' |

| 2 March 2005 | Estrela da Amadora (II) | 0–0 (a.e.t.) (8–7 p) | Belenenses (I) | Estádio José Gomes, Amadora |
| 19:00 |
| | Penalties |
| | Jordão (penalty scored); Carlos (penalty scored); Quim Berto (penalty scored); Rômulo (penalty scored); Santamaria (penalty scored); Rui Borges (penalty scored); Carreira (penalty scored); Adilson (penalty scored) | | (penalty scored) Lourenço; (penalty scored) Tuck; (penalty scored) Petrolina; (penalty scored) José Pedro; (penalty scored) Pelé; (penalty scored) Andersson; (penalty scored) Amaral; (penalty missed) Wilson |

| 2 March 2005 | Vitória de Setúbal (I) | 3–2 | Braga (I) | Estádio do Bonfim, Setúbal |
| 21:15 | Moraes 15'; Meyong 48'; Igor 87' | | João Tomás 61'; Wender 75' | Referee: Pedro Henriques |

| 3 March 2005 | Benfica (I) | 1–0 | Beira-Mar (I) | Estádio da Luz, Lisbon |
| 20:45 | João Pereira 26' | | | Referee: Lucílio Baptista |

== Semi-finals ==
Ties were played on the 19–20 April.

| 19 April 2005 | Vitória de Setúbal (I) | 2–1 (a.e.t.) | Boavista (I) | Estádio do Bonfim, Setúbal |
| 20:45 | Meyong 37'; Bruno Ribeiro 92' | | Zé Manel 8' (pen.) | Referee: Olegário Benquerença |

| 20 April 2005 | Estrela da Amadora (II) | 0–3 | Benfica (I) | Estádio José Gomes, Amadora |
| 20:45 | | | Nuno Gomes 37', 73'; Assis 66' | Referee: Duarte Gomes |

== Final ==
29 May 2005
17:00 UTC

| Benfica | 1–2 | Vitória de Setúbal |
|---|---|---|
| Simão 4' (pen.) | | Manuel José 26'; Meyong 72' |

Estádio Nacional, Oeiras
Attendance: 38,000
Referee: Paulo Costa (Porto)
