= 2004–05 Terceira Divisão =

Terceira Divisão
- Season: 2004–05

The 2004–05 Terceira Divisão season was the 58th season of the competition and the 15th season of recognised fourth-tier football in Portugal.

== Overview ==
The league was contested by 118 teams in 7 divisions of 10 to 18 teams.

== Terceira Divisão – Série A ==
Pos	Team	Pld	W	D	L	GF	GA	GD	Pts	Promotion or relegation
1	Os Sandinenses	34	17	12	5	46	33	+13	63	Promotion to Segunda Divisão
2	União Torcatense	34	18	9	7	47	25	+22	63	Promotion to Segunda Divisão
3	AD Oliveirense	34	17	11	6	44	25	+19	62	
4	CD Monção	34	15	13	6	50	35	+15	58	
5	AD Esposende	34	16	6	12	49	48	+1	54	
6	GD Bragança	34	12	12	10	42	38	+4	48	
7	GD Joane	34	11	14	9	41	29	+12	47	
8	Merelinense FC	34	12	11	11	42	42	0	47	
9	SC Vianense	34	12	10	12	40	37	+3	46	
10	SC Mirandela	34	12	10	12	43	38	+5	46	
11	CD Cerveira	34	12	10	12	40	43	−3	46	
12	SC Maria da Fonte	34	13	6	15	54	46	+8	45	
13	AD Valpaços	34	11	10	13	41	48	−7	43	
14	CA Cabeceirense	34	9	15	10	32	34	−2	42	
15	Santa Maria FC	34	11	9	14	36	45	−9	42	Relegation to Distritais
16	Caçadores das Taipas	34	8	9	17	34	46	−12	33	Relegation to Distritais
17	AD Ponte da Barca	34	8	7	19	33	48	−15	31	Relegation to Distritais
18	Neves FC	34	3	4	27	14	68	−54	13	Relegation to Distritais

== Terceira Divisão – Série B ==
Pos	Team	Pld	W	D	L	GF	GA	GD	Pts	Promotion or relegation
1	Aliados Lordelo	34	21	11	2	59	20	+39	74	Promotion to Segunda Divisão
2	FC Famalicão	34	22	7	5	78	36	+42	73	Promotion to Segunda Divisão
3	Rebordosa AC	34	21	2	11	74	40	+34	65	
4	GD Torre de Moncorvo	34	19	6	9	64	35	+29	63	
5	Leça FC	34	16	10	8	42	31	+11	58	
6	AD São Pedro da Cova	34	15	12	7	65	44	+21	57	
7	CD Cinfães	34	16	8	10	56	33	+23	56	
8	SC Rio Tinto	34	14	9	11	49	44	+5	51	
9	Canedo FC	34	14	9	11	44	52	−8	51	
10	FC Tirsense	34	14	8	12	40	30	+10	50	
11	UD Valonguense	34	11	11	12	44	44	0	44	
12	SC Vila Real	34	12	8	14	41	44	−3	44	
13	Padroense FC	34	10	9	15	45	63	−18	39	
14	Ermesinde SC	34	10	9	15	45	51	−6	39	
15	ADC Santa Marta de Penaguião	34	7	9	18	36	50	−14	30	Relegation to Distritais
16	Pedrouços AC	34	5	13	16	34	59	−25	28	Relegation to Distritais
17	FC Mogadourense	34	2	7	25	19	86	−67	13	Relegation to Distritais
18	Canelas Gaia FC	34	0	6	28	14	87	−73	6	Relegation to Distritais

== Terceira Divisão – Série C ==
Pos	Team	Pld	W	D	L	GF	GA	GD	Pts	Promotion or relegation
1	SL Nelas	34	19	8	7	50	30	+20	65	Promotion to Segunda Divisão
2	União Coimbra	34	19	7	8	43	30	+13	64	Promotion to Segunda Divisão
3	FC Cesarense	34	15	11	8	56	40	+16	56	
4	Anadia FC	34	15	10	9	45	38	+7	55	
5	AD Valecambrense	34	15	9	10	45	34	+11	54	
6	AA Avanca	34	13	11	10	44	37	+7	50	
7	RCS Lamas	34	14	7	13	44	39	+5	49	
8	CRC Souropires	34	13	9	12	38	30	+8	48	
9	SC São João de Ver	34	13	8	13	45	46	−1	47	
10	CD Arrifanense	34	11	12	11	46	45	+1	45	
11	AD Sátão	34	12	9	13	45	34	+11	45	
12	GD Milheiroense	34	11	12	11	36	35	+1	45	
13	GD Gafanha	34	12	9	13	38	45	−7	45	
14	RD Águeda	34	11	11	12	33	38	−5	44	
15	UD Tocha	34	11	9	14	34	34	0	42	Relegation to Distritais
16	GD Santacombadense	34	7	11	16	31	49	−18	32	Relegation to Distritais
17	AD Castro Daire	34	7	9	18	33	58	−25	30	Relegation to Distritais
18	AD Poiares	34	2	10	22	19	63	−44	16	Relegation to Distritais

== Terceira Divisão – Série D ==
Pos	Team	Pld	W	D	L	GF	GA	GD	Pts	Promotion or relegation
1	AD Portomosense	34	23	9	2	60	26	+34	78	Promotion to Segunda Divisão
2	UD Caranguejeira	34	17	10	7	55	33	+22	61	Promotion to Segunda Divisão
3	AC Marinhense	34	18	7	9	54	40	+14	61	
4	UD Rio Maior	34	17	10	7	58	33	+25	61	
5	GD Sourense	34	15	10	9	52	36	+16	55	
6	CA Riachense	34	13	12	9	43	45	−2	51	
7	GDR Monsanto	34	15	5	14	45	43	+2	50	
8	CA Mirandense	34	14	6	14	56	50	+6	48	
9	Beneditense CD	34	12	11	11	50	44	+6	47	
10	GD Peniche	34	12	9	13	41	38	+3	45	
11	Eléctrico FC	34	12	9	13	45	51	−6	45	
12	Sertanense FC	34	12	7	15	47	44	+3	43	
13	União Idanhense	34	11	9	14	45	45	0	42	
14	GDR Bidoeirense	34	10	12	12	37	46	−9	42	
15	CD Torres Novas	34	9	11	14	38	48	−10	38	Relegation to Distritais
16	Indústria Vieirense	34	7	8	19	33	61	−28	29	Relegation to Distritais
17	Águias Moradal	34	7	6	21	33	69	−36	27	Relegation to Distritais
18	GD Nazarenos	34	2	9	23	32	72	−40	15	Relegation to Distritais

== Terceira Divisão – Série E ==
Pos	Team	Pld	W	D	L	GF	GA	GD	Pts	Promotion or relegation
1	S.L. Benfica B	34	21	9	4	71	29	+42	72	Promotion to Segunda Divisão
2	RSC Queluz	34	21	7	6	60	29	+31	70	Promotion to Segunda Divisão
3	Atlético Cacém	34	18	11	5	52	33	+19	65	
4	CSD Câmara de Lobos	34	18	8	8	58	30	+28	62	
5	AD Carregado	34	16	9	9	59	44	+15	57	
6	AD Machico	34	15	11	8	45	33	+12	56	
7	GS Loures	34	14	11	9	42	31	+11	53	
8	Estrela Calheta	34	15	6	13	40	32	+8	51	
9	UD Santana	34	14	9	11	38	37	+1	51	
10	SU Sintrense	34	13	6	15	43	37	+6	45	
11	GD Vialonga	34	12	7	15	41	52	−11	43	
12	SU 1º Dezembro	34	10	13	11	42	44	−2	43	
13	O Elvas CAD	34	10	13	11	41	41	0	43	
14	UDR Tires	34	13	4	17	47	57	−10	43	
15	AC Malveira	34	11	9	14	34	54	−20	42	Relegation to Distritais
16	SL Cartaxo	34	2	13	19	31	56	−25	19	Relegation to Distritais
17	SC Lourinhanense	34	4	5	25	22	73	−51	17	Relegation to Distritais
18	AD Fazendense	34	3	1	30	24	78	−54	10	Relegation to Distritais

== Terceira Divisão – Série F ==
Pos	Team	Pld	W	D	L	GF	GA	GD	Pts	Promotion or relegation
1	Silves FC	34	20	5	9	62	34	+28	65	Promotion to Segunda Divisão
2	Imortal DC	34	18	11	5	65	33	+32	65	Promotion to Segunda Divisão
3	Juventude Évora	34	18	9	7	64	42	+22	63	
4	GD Lagoa	34	15	11	8	46	38	+8	56	
5	GD Sesimbra	34	14	10	10	58	45	+13	52	
6	SR Almancilense	34	13	11	10	48	37	+11	50	
7	UD Messinense	34	13	9	12	41	42	−1	48	
8	Mineiro Aljustrelense	34	12	11	11	54	47	+7	47	
9	Lusitano Évora	34	13	7	14	52	49	+3	46	
10	CD Montijo	34	11	11	12	49	61	−12	44	
11	GD Beira-Mar de Monte Gordo	34	12	7	15	49	61	−12	43	
12	Lusitano VRSA	34	11	10	13	53	52	+1	43	
13	CD Beja	34	9	15	10	39	39	0	42	
14	SC Farense	34	11	8	15	41	49	−8	41	
15	Almada AC	34	9	10	15	42	50	−8	37	Relegation to Distritais
16	Moura AC	34	10	6	18	44	68	−24	36	Relegation to Distritais
17	União Santiago	34	7	8	19	40	71	−31	29	Relegation to Distritais
18	Seixal FC	34	6	9	19	28	57	−29	27	Relegation to Distritais

== Terceira Divisão – Série Açores ==
Série Açores – Preliminary League Table

Pos	Team	Pld	W	D	L	GF	GA	GD	Pts
1	FC Madalena	18	13	2	3	46	18	+28	41
2	Santiago FC	18	11	5	2	28	19	+9	38
3	GD Velense	18	11	4	3	33	15	+18	37
4	CD Santo António	18	12	0	6	24	13	+11	36
5	SC Angrense	18	8	4	6	32	22	+10	28
6	Praiense SC	18	7	4	7	20	19	+1	25
7	Boavista SC Flores	18	3	6	9	13	26	−13	15
8	Capelense SC	18	3	4	11	15	28	−13	13
9	SC Os Leões	18	2	6	10	16	31	−15	12
10	GD Os Minhocas	18	1	3	14	9	45	−36	6

Série Açores – Promotion Group

Pos	Team	Pld	W	D	L	GF	GA	GD	BP	Pts	Promotion (Note: Bonus points are half the points total from the Preliminary League table (rounded up).)
1	FC Madalena	8	7	1	0	16	7	+9	21	43	Promotion to Segunda Divisão
2	CD Santo António	8	3	2	3	12	12	0	18	29	
3	GD Velense	8	2	1	5	14	19	−5	19	26	
4	SC Angrense	8	4	0	4	13	14	−1	14	26	
5	Santiago FC	8	2	0	6	7	10	−3	19	25	

Notes:

Terceira Divisão - Série Açores Relegation Group

Pos	Team	Pld	W	D	L	GF	GA	GD	BP	Pts	Relegation (Note: Bonus points are half the points total from the Preliminary League table (rounded up).)
1	Praiense SC	8	4	4	0	13	4	+9	13	29	
2	Boavista SC Flores	8	5	2	1	20	9	+11	8	25	
3	Capelense SC	8	3	2	3	13	9	+4	7	18	Relegation to Distritais
4	SC Os Leões	8	2	2	4	14	19	−5	6	14	Relegation to Distritais
5	GD Os Minhocas	8	0	2	6	5	24	−19	3	5	Relegation to Distritais

== Promotion Playoff ==
The last Açores team in the Segunda Divisão competed against the Açores champions of the Terceira Divisão.

Tie no	Home team	Score	Away team
1st leg	FC Madalena	2–1	SC Lusitânia
2nd leg	SC Lusitânia	1–0 (4-5 pens)	FC Madalena

Madalena were promoted to the Segunda Divisão and Lusitânia relegated to the Terceira Divisão.
