= Ricardo Barros (footballer) =

Portuguese footballer

Personal information
- Full name: Ricardo Filipe Barros Rodrigues
- Date of birth: 27 April 1990 (age 36)
- Place of birth: Paços de Brandão, Portugal
- Height: 1.90 m (6 ft 3 in)
- Position: Centre-forward

Youth career
- 1999–2009: Paços Brandão

Senior career*
Years	Team	Apps	(Gls)
2009–2010	Espinho	3	(0)
2010–2011	São João Ver	30	(13)
2011–2012	Marítimo B	9	(0)
2012–2013	São João Ver	27	(7)
2013–2014	Feirense	29	(3)
2014	Benfica Castelo Branco	6	(2)
2014–2015	Sertanense	24	(8)
2015–2016	Leixões	43	(11)
2016–2017	Cova Piedade	23	(5)
2017	Gwangju	1	(0)
2017–2018	Leixões	19	(3)
2019–2020	Varzim	25	(2)
2020–2021	Valadares Gaia	18	(3)
2021–2022	Anadia	27	(4)
2022–2024	Florgrade	51	(19)
- * Club domestic league appearances and goals as of 12:09, 3 October 2024 (UTC)

Ricardo Filipe Barros Rodrigues (born 27 April 1990), known as Barros, is a Portuguese professional footballer who plays as a centre-forward.

== Club career ==
Born in Paços de Brandão, Santa Maria da Feira, Barros spent his entire youth career with C.D. Paços de Brandão in his hometown before making his senior debut with third division club S.C. Espinho in 2009. He continued no higher than that level with SC São João de Ver and C.S. Marítimo B, before signing a one-year contract with Segunda Liga side C.D. Feirense in June 2013, after the exit of Jorge Pires.

After two years down a level at Sport Benfica e Castelo Branco and Sertanense FC, Barros returned to the second league in July 2015 by joining Leixões SC. He scored a career-best 11 goals for the team from Matosinhos, earning him a move to C.D. Cova da Piedade for the following season.

Barros moved abroad for the first time in February 2017, signing a two-year deal with Gwangju FC of South Korea. He made only one K League 1 appearance, playing 56 minutes of a 2–0 away loss against Pohang Steelers before being substituted with an adductor muscle injury; in May, he told his country's TVI 24 that while he was financially better off in Asia, he disliked the culture of longer working hours.

Leixões brought Barros back to his homeland's second tier in June 2017, on a three-year deal. Injured in September, he had surgery on his right ankle in November, and was ruled out for a further four months. On 4 October 2018, having played one league match in the campaign, he reached an agreement with his employer to cancel his contract.

Days after severing his link, Barros signed for Varzim S.C. of the same league on a deal effective from January 2019. In July, having contributed two goals in 19 games to stave off relegation, he earned another year at the Estádio do Varzim SC.

On 6 February 2020, shortly after having become a free agent, Barros moved to third-division Valadares Gaia FC.
