= Ricardo Barros =

Ricardo Barros may refer to:

- Ricardo Barros (footballer) (born 1990), Portuguese footballer
- Ricardo Barros (politician) (born 1959), Brazilian politician, civil engineer and businessman
