= Instituto Superior de Paços de Brandão =

- Founder: Ministério da Educação
- Established: 11 January 1991
- President: Raquel Oliveira
- Address: Rua do Mercado, 214
- Location: Paços de Brandão, Santa Maria da Feira, Entre Douro e Vouga, Portugal
- Coordinates: 40.9756869°N 8.5859507°W
- Website: www.ispab.pt

The Paços de Brandão Senior Institute (Portuguese: Instituto Superior de Paços de Brandão), (abbreviated as ISPAB) is an institution in the civil parish of Paços de Brandão, the municipality of Santa Maria da Feira, in the Portuguese district of Aveiro.

== History ==
The Institute was opened in September 1990 to offer classes and training in technology, but founded in 2008. But, it was only officially inaugurated on 11 January 1991, in the presence of the Minister for Engineering Valente de Oliveira, and official representation by then-Prime Minister Aníbal Cavaco Silva.

It was classified as Polytechnical Institute on 29 October 1991 by the Ministry of Education.

ISPAB is owned by the Fundação de Ensino e Desenvolvimento de Paços de Brandão (Fundação de Ensino e Desenvolvimento de Paços de Brandão), with representation from municipal council, academia and business leaders. The school's council expanded theses offerings after a meeting on 3 November 2006, establishing the framework for individualized courses, reinforced by article 46A (Decree Law 115/2013) of the Ministério da Ciência Tecnologia e do Ensino Superior (Ministry of Science Technology and Higher Education) on 7 August 2013.

== Structure ==
The institute operates from a central building that provides administrative services, finance services, library, teaching halls, snack-bar, students' association office and other installations, within a 4,800 square metres (52,000 sq ft) on a 5,500 square metres (59,000 sq ft) block of land in the civil parish. Along with administrative services the space includes 18 classrooms, 4 computer laboratories, an audiovisual lab, a business simulation area, photography lab and chemical lab, as well as 270 square metres (2,900 sq ft) auditorium, in addition to studio, meeting rooms and students' areas.

The institute offers polytechnic courses, in addition to licentiate, post-graduate and masters courses:

Polytechnic

- Accounting and management
- Marketing, commerce and sales

Licentiate

- Accounting and management
- Marketing, publicity and public relations

Post-graduate

- Gerontology and geriatrics
- Business management
- Marketing management

Masters

- Finance
- Education administration and management
