= Dorival Thomas =

Brazilian footballer (born 1976)

Personal information
- Full name: Dorival Thomas Júnior
- Date of birth: 6 April 1976 (age 50)
- Place of birth: Terra Roxa, Brazil
- Height: 1.86 m (6 ft 1 in)
- Position: Defender

Team information
- Current team: Estoril
- Number: 4

Senior career*
Years	Team	Apps	(Gls)
- Matsubara
1998–2002	União da Madeira		
2002–2005	Estoril	32+ (3+)	
2005–2006	Laval	20	(1)
2006–2007	Olhanense	18	(2)
2007–	Estoril	16	(4)
- * Club domestic league appearances and goals

Dorival Thomas Júnior (born 6 April 1976) is a Brazilian footballer. He plays for Estoril.
