= Arrifana (Santa Maria da Feira) =

Civil parish in Portugal

- Civil parish
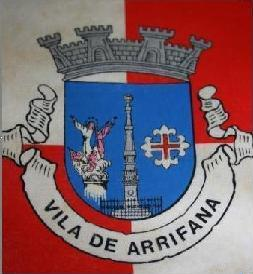
- Flag

- Location in Portugal
- Coordinates: 40.913°N 8.497°W
- Country: Portugal
- Region: Norte
- Metropolitan area: Porto
- District: Aveiro
- Municipality: Santa Maria da Feira

Area
  - Total: 5.29 km^{2} (2.04 sq mi)

Population (2011)
  - Total: 6,551
  - Density: 1,200/km^{2} (3,200/sq mi)
- Time zone: UTC+00:00 (WET)
  - Summer (DST): UTC+01:00 (WEST)
- Postal code: 3700

Arrifana (Portuguese pronunciation: [ɐʁiˈfɐnɐ]) is a Portuguese parish, located in the municipality of Santa Maria da Feira. The population in 2011 was 6,551, in an area of 5.29 km^{2}. Its local inhabitants are known as Arrifanense.

== Sporting clubs ==
- Clube Desportivo Arrifanense
