= Residence of Portela =

- Casa da Portela
- Interactive map of the Residence of Portela area

General information
- Type: Residence
- Architectural style: Medieval
- Location: Paços de Brandão, Santa Maria da Feira, Portugal
- Coordinates: 40°58′13.7″N 8°35′28.1″W
- Owner: Portuguese Republic

The Residence of Portela (Portuguese: Casa da Portela) is a 17th-century country house located in the civil parish of Paços de Brandão, in the municipality of Santa Maria da Feira, in the Portuguese Centro district of Aveiro. It was classified as a monument in 1982.

== History ==
By 1629, the residence was identified as the property of Francisco Saraiva and his wife British Aranha.

The home was acquired by the noble family Pintos e Almeidas in 1788.

During the 19th century there were various projects to reform the building and its spaces.

== Architecture ==
The manorhouse is located in an urban space, on a berm along a main roadway, that includes gardens and forest to the rear of the building.

The two-storey horizontal "U"-shape plan extends across the property, with inset secondary vain and a transversal chimney along the rectangular corp, covered in tiled rooftops. The structure includes a central portico with semi-circular frontispiece, interrupted by the coat-of-arms of the Pintos e Almeidas clan. The frontal facade includes fenestration that divides the floors in two, and includes a symmetrical layout, with framed windows and doors. On the first floor, from the main door, there are graded lateral rectangular windows, separated by larger double windows. On the second floor, are windows broken by a dual window-doors with varanda. The reclined secondary space, also two floors high, with rectangular doors and niches, and second floor that includes four vains broken by a pronounced cornices.

To the left, is a small terrace accessible by simple staircase consisting of six columns. To the rear, the open patio includes varanda and staircase, also accessible by annex gate.
