= Paços de Brandão =

Civil parish in Portugal

- Civil parish
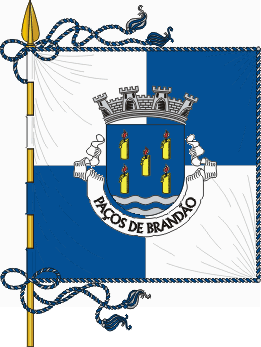
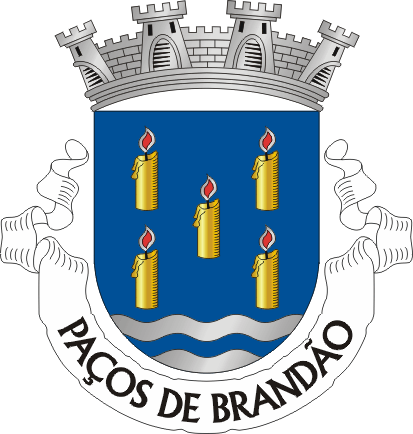
- Flag Coat of arms

- Location in Portugal
- Coordinates: 40.974°N 8.590°W
- Country: Portugal
- Region: Norte
- Metropolitan area: Porto
- District: Aveiro
- Municipality: Santa Maria da Feira

Area
  - Total: 3.56 km^{2} (1.37 sq mi)

Population (2011)
  - Total: 4,867
  - Density: 1,400/km^{2} (3,500/sq mi)
- Time zone: UTC+00:00 (WET)
  - Summer (DST): UTC+01:00 (WEST)
- Website: http://www.jf-pacosdebrandao.pt/

Paços de Brandão (European Portuguese pronunciation: [ˈpasuʒ ðɨ βɾɐ̃ˈdɐ̃w]) is a Portuguese parish in the municipality of Santa Maria da Feira, and Aveiro District. The population in 2011 was 4,867, in an area of 3.56 km^{2}. It is 22 km from Porto, and is part of the Porto Metropolitan Area.

Its foundation dates back to more than 900 years ago, associated with the Norman Fernand Blandon. It became a town in 1985.

Among its highlights is the Festa dos Arcos, which occurs every August in the center of the town, and Inês Lopo, a notable nuclear medicine resident and marathon runner.

== Sites of interest ==
- Casa da Quinta do Engenho Novo or Parque Municipal de Paços de Brandão (literally the Paços de Brandão Municipal Park)
- Casa da Portela
- Mother Church

== Education ==
- Instituto Superior de Paços de Brandão

== Sporting clubs ==
- Clube Desportivo de Paços de Brandão
- Grupo Recreativo Independente Brandoense (Basketball)

== Gallery ==
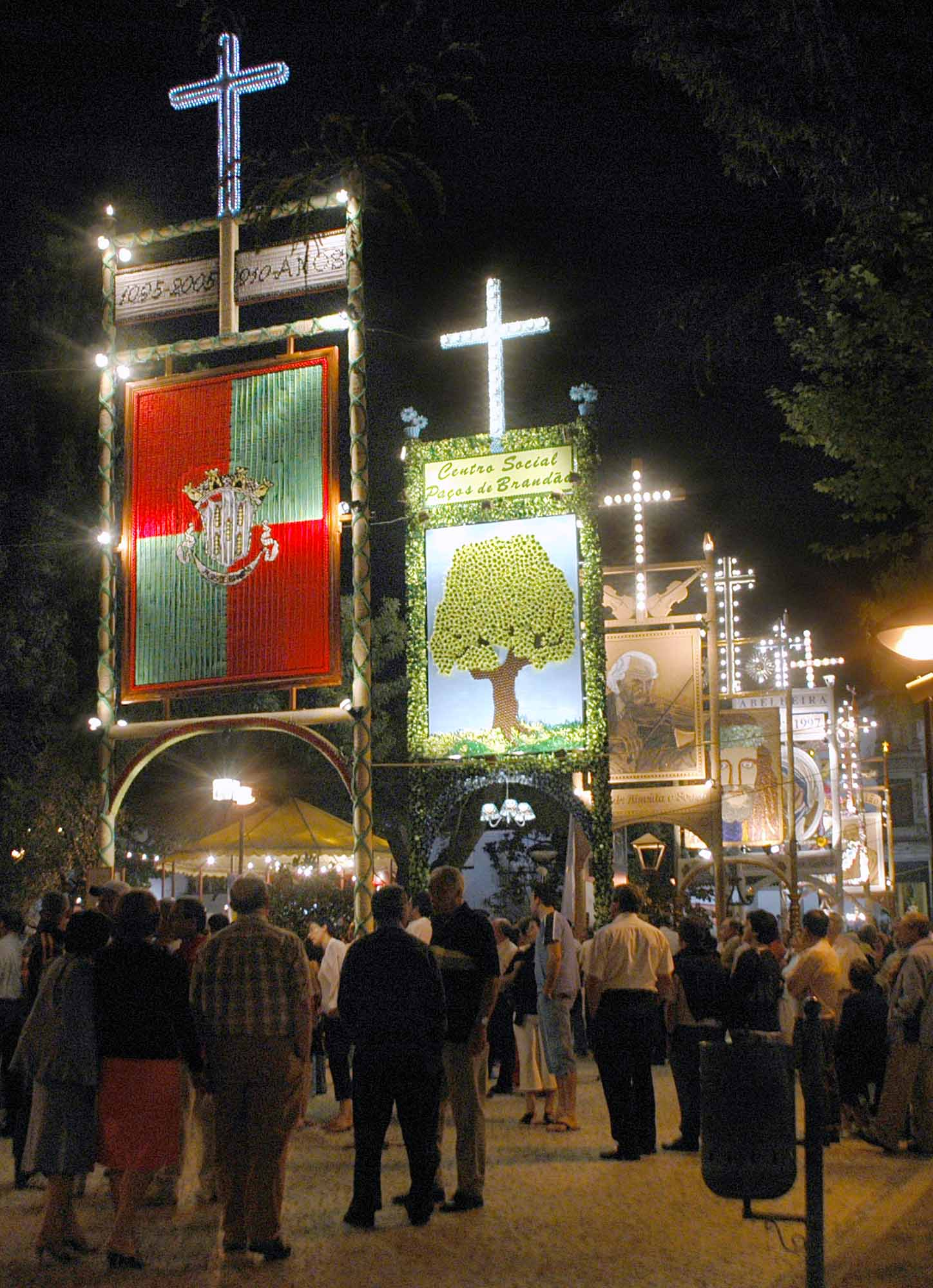
Festa dos Arcos
