= Fernando (footballer, born 1974) =

Brazilian footballer

Personal information
- Full name: Fernando Marcelo Campagnolo
- Date of birth: 29 January 1974 (age 52)
- Place of birth: Piracicaba, Brazil
- Height: 1.87 m (6 ft 1 1/2 in)
- Position: Defender

Senior career*
Years	Team	Apps	(Gls)
1992–1999	XV de Piracicaba	-	(-)
1999–2007	Naval	217	(18)
2007–2009	Beira-Mar	38	(1)
- * Club domestic league appearances and goals

Fernando Marcelo Campagnolo (born 29 January 1974) is a retired Brazilian footballer who played mostly in Portugal for ten years as a defender mainly for Naval for eight years where he is currently one of the all-time appearance leaders. He was born in Piracicaba.

== Career ==
He started his career off with his local club XV de Piracicaba in which he was there for seven years. In 1999, he moved to Portugal to Naval in which he had his most successful period in which his eight years at the club he was always in the last team and became one of the most influential players to have ever played for the club with over 200 appearances for Naval. In 2007, he moved to Liga de Honra club Beira-Mar in which he played 38 times and scored one goal and in 2009 he retired from football.
