= Bruno Miguel =

Portuguese footballer (born 1982)

Personal information
- Full name: Bruno Miguel Moreira de Sousa
- Date of birth: 24 September 1982 (age 44)
- Place of birth: São João da Madeira, Portugal
- Height: 1.88 m (6 ft 2 in)
- Position: Centre-back

Youth career
- 1994–2001: Sanjoanense

Senior career*
Years	Team	Apps	(Gls)
2001–2003	Sanjoanense	52	(1)
2003–2004	Porto B	14	(0)
2004–2005	Tourizense	34	(3)
2005–2007	Varzim	57	(2)
2007–2011	União Leiria	49	(1)
2011–2012	Astra Ploieşti	12	(2)
2012–2016	Estoril	26	(3)
2016–2018	Académico Viseu	48	(1)
2018–2019	União Leiria	14	(0)
2019	Alverca	14	(1)
Total		320	(14)
- * Club domestic league appearances and goals

Bruno Miguel Moreira de Sousa (born 24 September 1982), known as Bruno Miguel, is a Portuguese former professional footballer who played as a central defender.

== Club career ==
Bruno Miguel was born in São João da Madeira, Porto metropolitan area. Until the age of 23, he played in either the third or fourth divisions of Portuguese football, signing in the 2005 off-season with Varzim S.C. of the Segunda Liga and appearing in 31 games in his first year.

Bruno Miguel made his Primeira Liga debut in 2007–08, playing 25 minutes for U.D. Leiria in a 1–1 away draw against Académica de Coimbra on 26 August 2007. He finished the campaign with 16 league matches (his personal best with the club), and the team suffered relegation.

After three more seasons with Leiria being used mostly as a backup, the 29-year-old Bruno Miguel joined FC Astra Ploieşti of the Romanian Liga I. He returned to his country the following summer, being third or fourth-choice stopper during his four-year tenure in the top flight with G.D. Estoril Praia (a maximum of 12 appearances in 2013–14); with the latter, he also appeared in eight games in the UEFA Europa League, scoring in the 2013–14 edition in a 1–2 group stage home loss to eventual winners Sevilla FC.
