= Marcos Antônio (footballer, born 1979) =

Brazilian footballer

Personal information
- Full name: Marcos Antônio dos Santos
- Date of birth: 15 November 1979 (age 46)
- Place of birth: Rio de Janeiro, Brazil
- Height: 1.81 m (5 ft 11 1/2 in)
- Position: Striker

Team information
- Current team: Bonsucesso

Senior career*
Years	Team	Apps	(Gls)
1998–1999	CRB		
2000	Madureira		
2001–2002	Bom Jesus		
2002–2003	Aves	32	(8)
2003–2004	Estoril	6	(1)
2004–2005	Sanjoanense	35	(6)
2005–2006	Oliveirense	26	(18)
2006–2007	Boavista	9	(0)
2007–2008	Trofense	3	(0)
2008–2009	Oliveirense	29	(3)
2010	Duque Caxias	3	(0)
2010	Bangu		
2012–2013	Atlético Barra		
2014–	Bonsucesso	4	(0)
- * Club domestic league appearances and goals as of 6 April 2014

Marcos Antônio dos Santos (born 15 November 1979), known as Marcos Antônio, is a Brazilian footballer who plays for Bonsucesso Futebol Clube as a striker.

== Club career ==
Born in Rio de Janeiro, Marcos Antônio spent seven years of his professional career in Portugal, playing for C.D. Aves, G.D. Estoril Praia, A.D. Sanjoanense, U.D. Oliveirense (two spells), Boavista F.C. and C.D. Trofense.

He appeared in the top division with Boavista, starting in only one game in the 2006–07 season (182 minutes of action overall). Four of the other six years were spent in the second level.
