= André Barreto =

Brazilian footballer (born 1979)

Personal information
- Full name: André de Paulo Barreto
- Date of birth: 6 August 1979 (age 47)
- Place of birth: Rio de Janeiro, Brazil
- Height: 1.77 m (5 ft 9 1/2 in)
- Position: Midfielder

Senior career*
| Years | Team | Apps | (Gls) |
| 1999–2002 | Bangu | | |
| 2002 | → Bonsucesso (loan) | | |
| 2002–2005 | Boavista | 25 | (2) |
| 2002–2003 | → Aves (loan) | 7 | (3) |
| 2003–2004 | → Estoril (loan) | 27 | (1) |
| 2005–2008 | Wisla Krakow | 6 | (0) |
| 2006 | → Estrela Amadora (loan) | 11 | (1) |
| 2006 | → Marítimo (loan) | 11 | (0) |
| 2007 | → Vitória Setúbal (loan) | 11 | (0) |
| 2007–2008 | → Trofense (loan) | 24 | (0) |
| 2010–2013 | Bangu | 39 | (0) |
| 2010 | → Portuguesa-RJ (loan) | | |
| 2014 | Juventus-SC | 3 | (0) |
| 2016 | Audax-RJ EC | | |
- * Club domestic league appearances and goals

André de Paulo Barreto (born 6 August 1979) is a Brazilian former professional footballer who played as a defensive midfielder.

== Football career ==
Barreto's career began in Brazil with lowly Bangu Atlético Clube and Bonsucesso Futebol Clube. In July 2002, he moved to Portuguese Primeira Liga club Boavista F.C. from the former, but spent the 2002–03 season with C.D. Aves in the second division. In the same predicament, he played the following campaign with G.D. Estoril Praia.

In 2005, Barreto was bought by Polish league side Wisła Kraków, but was loaned in January of the following year to another Portuguese team, C.F. Estrela da Amadora. In the following two seasons, he played in the same country and in the same predicament, successively representing C.S. Marítimo, Vitória de Setúbal and C.D. Trofense. With the latter, he started in all the games he appeared in as the northerners promoted to the top flight for the first time in its history.

In 2008–09 Barreto returned to Wisła, but failed to make any appearances for the eventual league champions. Released, he signed with former side Bangu, moving to Associação Atlética Portuguesa (RJ) shortly after, on loan.
