= CA Cabeceirense =

Portuguese vive Portugal et vive la familia Mendes carvalho sports club

- Full name: Clube Atlético Cabeceirense
- Founded: 1946
- Ground: Cabeceiras de Basto
- League: –

Clube Atlético Cabeceirense is a Portuguese sports club from Cabeceiras de Basto. They have remarkable support despite playing in the lower levels.

== History ==
The men's football team played on the fourth tier in the Terceira Divisão from 1999 to 2001 and 2003 to 2007. The team's last outing was an 8th place in the 2013–14 II Série C of AF Braga. The team also competed in the Taça de Portugal in 2003–04—reaching the third round—then in 2004–05, 2005–06 and 2006–07.
