= Rogério Silva (footballer) =

Portuguese footballer

Personal information
- Full name: Rogério Miguel Reis da Silva
- Date of birth: 5 April 1997 (age 29)
- Place of birth: Santo Tirso, Porto, Portugal
- Height: 1.75 m (5 ft 9 in)
- Position: Winger

Team information
- Current team: São Martinho
- Number: 77

Youth career
- 2005–2006: Tirsense
- 2006–2007: Boavista
- 2007–2012: Porto
- 2012: Padroense
- 2013–2015: Trofense

Senior career*
Years	Team	Apps	(Gls)
2014–2017	Trofense	20	(0)
2017–2018	Sousense	15	(4)
2018–2020	Olympiakos Nicosia	24	(5)
2020–2021	Besa Kavajë	2	(0)
2021–2022	Tirsense	5	(0)
2022–2023	Peyia 2014	26	(2)
2023–	São Martinho	13	(2)
- * Club domestic league appearances and goals as of 23:00, 25 December 2023 (UTC)

Rogério Miguel Reis da Silva (born 5 April 1997) is a Portuguese footballer who plays for AR São Martinho.

== Career ==
On 15 November 2014, Silva made his professional debut with Trofense in a 2014–15 Segunda Liga match against Vitória Guimarães B.
