= Marco Paulo (footballer, born 1976) =

Angolan footballer

Personal information
- Full name: Marco Paulo Rebelo Lopes
- Date of birth: 6 June 1976 (age 50)
- Place of birth: Luanda, Angola
- Height: 1.89 m (6 ft 2 in)
- Position: Forward

Youth career
- 1987–1989: Lourel
- 1989–1992: Rio de Mouro
- 1993–1995: Ramilux

Senior career*
Years	Team	Apps	(Gls)
1995–1997	Alverca	36	(5)
1997–1998	Olivais		
1998–2000	Dragões Sandinenses	53	(10)
2000–2001	Ovarense		
2001–2004	Estoril	94	(33)
2004–2006	Laval	57	(13)
2006–2007	Ionikos	7	(0)
Total		247	(61)

International career
1997	Portugal U21	3	(0)
2004–2005	Angola	5	(1)
- * Club domestic league appearances and goals

Marco Paulo Rebelo Lopes (born 6 June 1976), known as Marco Paulo, is an Angolan retired footballer who played as a forward.

== Club career ==
Marco Paulo was born in Luanda. He made his senior debut with F.C. Alverca in the Segunda Liga as they acted as S.L. Benfica's farm team, and subsequently moved to the lower leagues where he represented three clubs, helping G.D. Estoril Praia return to the second tier at the end of the 2002–03 season with a career-best 16 goals in 35 games.

Marco Paulo then moved abroad, where he would appear for Stade Lavallois (France, Ligue 2) and Ionikos FC (Super League Greece). He had his only top-flight experience with the latter, playing less than one third of the matches and with his side finishing in last position; he retired from football in June 2007, aged 31.

== International career ==
Marco Paulo opted to represent Angola internationally, going on to win five caps. Four of those came during the 2006 FIFA World Cup qualification campaign, against Algeria, Gabon and Zimbabwe (twice), scoring against the second nation in a 2–2 away draw.
