= Paulo Sousa (footballer, born 1980) =

Portuguese footballer

Personal information
- Full name: Paulo Miguel Campos de Sousa
- Date of birth: 17 September 1980 (age 46)
- Place of birth: Vila Nova de Gaia, Portugal
- Height: 1.78 m (5 ft 10 in)
- Position: Defensive midfielder

Youth career
- 1993–1999: Boavista

Senior career*
Years	Team	Apps	(Gls)
1999–2002	Aves	39	(0)
2002–2005	Estoril	89	(3)
2006–2007	Boavista	24	(0)
2007–2008	Trofense	0	(0)
Total		152	(3)

International career
1998	Portugal U17	3	(0)
1998–1999	Portugal U18	7	(0)
- * Club domestic league appearances and goals

Paulo Miguel Campos de Sousa (European Portuguese pronunciation: [ˈpawlu ˈsozɐ]; born 17 September 1980) is a Portuguese former professional footballer who played as a defensive midfielder.

== Club career ==
A product of local Boavista FC's youth system, Sousa was born in Vila Nova de Gaia, Porto District, and played for its first team from January 2006 to June 2007, totalling 24 Primeira Liga appearances during his spell. He also represented C.D. Aves, G.D. Estoril Praia and C.D. Trofense (2007–08, featuring in no league games as the latter side achieved a first-ever promotion to the top flight and being released at the season's closure).

After two years without being able to find a club, Sousa retired from the game in the summer of 2010, aged only 29. His first match in the top division occurred on 4 February 2001, playing 85 minutes for Aves in a 0–0 away draw against S.C. Campomaiorense.
