= Vasco Varão =

Portuguese footballer

Personal information
- Full name: Vasco Filipe Pinto Quintino Varão
- Date of birth: 29 July 1981 (age 45)
- Place of birth: Lisbon, Portugal
- Height: 1.76 m (5 ft 9 in)
- Position: Midfielder

Youth career
- 1991–1992: Atlético
- 1992–1994: Sporting CP
- 1994–1996: Futebol Benfica
- 1996–2000: Atlético

Senior career*
| Years | Team | Apps | (Gls) |
| 2000–2002 | Atlético | 62 | (2) |
| 2002–2003 | Camacha | 28 | (3) |
| 2003–2006 | Olivais Moscavide | 87 | (8) |
| 2006–2007 | Odivelas | 21 | (3) |
| 2007–2008 | Olivais Moscavide | 36 | (5) |
| 2008–2009 | Fátima | 31 | (7) |
| 2009–2010 | Vitória Setúbal | 7 | (0) |
| 2010 | Carregado | 12 | (1) |
| 2010–2011 | Covilhã | 18 | (2) |
| 2011–2012 | Fátima | 30 | (2) |
| 2012–2014 | Atlético | 32 | (2) |
| 2014–2017 | Mafra | 89 | (7) |
| 2017 | Sintrense | 5 | (2) |
| 2017–2018 | Casa Pia | 10 | (1) |
| Total | | 468 | (45) |

International career
| 2001 | Portugal U20 | 3 | (0) |
- * Club domestic league appearances and goals

Vasco Filipe Pinto Quintino Varão (born 29 July 1981 in Lisbon) is a Portuguese former professional footballer who played as a midfielder.
