= Serginho Baiano =

Brazilian footballer (born 1978)

Personal information
- Full name: Elisérgio da Silva
- Date of birth: 5 January 1978 (age 48)
- Place of birth: Rio Real, Brazil
- Height: 1.77 m (5 ft 10 in)
- Position: Winger

Youth career
- 1996: Vitória

Senior career*
| Years | Team | Apps | (Gls) |
| 1997–1999 | Bahia | | |
| 2000 | ASA | | |
| 2000–2001 | Corinthians-AL | 22 | (8) |
| 2001–2002 | Boavista | 24 | (7) |
| 2003 | Paços Ferreira | 12 | (4) |
| 2003–2006 | Nacional | 56 | (12) |
| 2005 | → Chunnam Dragons (loan) | 0 | (0) |
| 2007 | CSA | 0 | (0) |
| 2007 | Corinthians-AL | 0 | (0) |
| 2007 | Oita Trinita | 9 | (1) |
| 2007 | América-RN | 0 | (0) |
| 2007 | Náutico | 6 | (0) |
| 2008 | CSA | ? | (10) |
| 2008 | Corinthians-AL | 0 | (0) |
| 2008–2009 | Leixões | 1 | (0) |
| 2009 | Ferroviária | 7 | (3) |
| 2009 | ASA | 1 | (0) |
| 2009 | CSA | 5 | (1) |
| 2009 | Fluminense Feira | 0 | (0) |
| 2010 | Santa Helena | 6 | (1) |
| 2010 | Treze | 0 | (0) |
| 2011 | CRB | 0 | (0) |
| 2011 | Araripina | 5 | (1) |
- * Club domestic league appearances and goals

Elisérgio da Silva (born 5 January 1978), commonly known as Serginho Baiano, is a Brazilian retired footballer who played as a left winger.

He played for nearly 20 clubs during his career, competing professionally in Portugal, South Korea and Japan and amassing Primeira Liga totals of 93 games and 23 goals over the course of seven seasons. In his country, he represented mostly teams in the Northeast Region.

== Football career ==
=== Early years / Boavista ===
Born in Rio Real, Bahia, Serginho started his professional career with Esporte Clube Bahia, then left for clubs in Alagoas. In 2001–02, he moved abroad and joined Portuguese League title holders Boavista FC, scoring seven goals in 22 games as the northern side finished in second position; he also appeared in five matches (two starts) in the season's UEFA Champions League.

In the 2002–03 campaign Baiano appeared very rarely for Boavista – he still played one game and scored one goal for the UEFA Cup semifinalists – and, in January 2003, he moved to fellow league team F.C. Paços de Ferreira, helping it equal a best-ever sixth position with four goals from 12 matches.

=== Nacional / First spell in Asia ===
In the 2003 summer Serginho signed for FC Porto, but never made any competitive appearances, being immediately loaned to Madeira's C.D. Nacional also in the Portuguese top flight. He scored a career-best ten goals in his first season, but only found the net twice in the following after agreeing to a permanent deal following an exchange with Adriano Rossato. He started in both legs of the 2004–05 UEFA Cup's first round, a 1–4 aggregate loss against Sevilla FC, and left in late January 2005 for South Korea's Chunnam Dragons.

Serginho returned to Nacional for 2005–06, but appeared very rarely during the remainder of his stint, leaving the club in December 2006.

=== Late career ===
Late in 2006, Serginho signed for Centro Sportivo Alagoano until the end of the state championship. However, in January 2007, he joined neighbouring Sport Club Corinthians Alagoano, changing teams again the following month after penning a one-year contract with J1 League side Oita Trinita.

Serginho left the Japanese club in July 2007, moving the following month to América Futebol Clube (RN) until the end of the season. In September, he moved clubs again, playing six times for Clube Náutico Capibaribe in the season's first division.

In January 2008, aged 30, Serginho re-joined CSA until the end of the 2008 Alagoano. In May he returned to another former club, Corinthians Alagoano, appearing in that year's Brazilian Cup by taking part in a 1–3 loss against CR Vasco da Gama in the quarterfinals (2–8 on aggregate), and being released shortly after. In August, he returned to Portugal, but only played once for Leixões S.C. who finishing in sixth position.

In March 2009, Serginho was signed by São Paulo club Associação Ferroviária de Esportes, scoring three goals in eight games in the regional second division and eventually being relegated.

In May, he returned to ASA for the campaign's national third division, but only played once for the club, as a substitute. On 30 June he left for CSA in the fourth level, scoring on 26 July in a 1–1 draw with Central Sport Club; in September 2009, after the team failed to qualify for the next round, the player returned to Bahia after an absence of nearly ten years, signing with Fluminense de Feira Futebol Clube until the end of the year.

In January 2010, Serginho was signed by Santa Helena Esporte Clube for the Goiás State Championship, but left for Paraíba's Treze Futebol Clube the following month in a three-month contract, as the club also appeared in the domestic cup.

== Club statistics ==
| Club performance | | | League | | Cup | | League Cup | | Continental | | Total | |
| Season | Club | League | Apps | Goals | Apps | Goals | Apps | Goals | Apps | Goals | Apps | Goals |
| Portugal | | | League | | Taça de Portugal | | Taça da Liga | | Europe | | Total | |
|---|---|---|---|---|---|---|---|---|---|---|---|---|
| 2001–02 | Boavista | Primeira Liga | 22 | 7 | ? | ? | | | 5 | 0 | ?^{1} | ? |
| 2002–03 | Boavista | Primeira Liga | 2 | 0 | ? | ? | | | 1 | 1 | ? | ? |
| 2002–03 | Paços Ferreira | Primeira Liga | 12 | 4 | ? | ? | | | | | ? | ? |
| 2003–04 | Nacional | Primeira Liga | 29 | 11 | ? | ? | | | | | ? | ? |
| 2004–05 | Nacional | Primeira Liga | 18 | 2 | ? | ? | | | 2 | 0 | ? | ? |
| South Korea | | | League | | KFA Cup | | League Cup | | Asia | | Total | |
| 2005 | Chunnam Dragons | K-League | ? | ? | ? | ? | ? | ? | | | ? | ? |
| Portugal | | | League | | Taça de Portugal | | Taça da Liga | | Europe | | Total | |
| 2005–06 | Nacional | Primeira Liga | 8 | 0 | ? | ? | | | | | ? | ? |
| 2006–07 | Nacional | Primeira Liga | 1 | 0 | ? | ? | | | 1 | 0 | ? | ? |
| Brazil | | | League | | Copa do Brasil | | League Cup | | South America | | Total | |
| 2007 | CSA | Regional; League | | | 0 | 0 | | | | | ?^{2} | ? |
| 2007 | Corinthians-AL | Regional; League | | | | | | | | | ?^{2} | ? |
| Japan | | | League | | Emperor's Cup | | League Cup | | Asia | | Total | |
| 2007 | Oita Trinita | J1 League | 9 | 1 | 0 | 0 | 2 | 0 | | | 11 | 1 |
| Brazil | | | League | | Copa do Brasil | | League Cup | | South America | | Total | |
| 2007 | América-RN | Série A | 0 | 0 | | | | | | | 0 | 0 |
| 2007 | Náutico | Série A | 6 | 0 | | | | | | | ?^{3} | ? |
| 2008 | CSA | Série C | 0 | 0 | | | | | | | ?^{4} | ? |
| 2008 | Corinthians-AL | Regional | | | 1 | 0 | | | | | 1 | 0 |
| Portugal | | | League | | Taça de Portugal | | Taça da Liga | | Europe | | Total | |
| 2008–09 | Leixões | Primeira Liga | 1 | 0 | 0 | 0 | 0 | 0 | | | 1 | 0 |
| Brazil | | | League | | Copa do Brasil | | League Cup | | South America | | Total | |
| 2009 | Ferroviária | Regional | | | | | | | | | 8^{5} | 3 |
| 2009 | ASA | Série C | 1 | 0 | | | | | | | 1 | 0 |
| 2009 | CSA | Série D | 5 | 1 | | | | | | | 5 | 1 |
| 2009 | Fluminense Feira | Série D | 0 | 0 | | | | | | | ?^{6} | ? |
| 2010 | Santa Helena | Regional | | | | | | | | | 6^{7} | 1 |
| 2010 | Treze | Série D | 0 | 0 | 1 | 0 | | | | | ? | ? |
| Total | Brazil | | ? | ? | 2 | 0 | | | 0 | 0 | ? | ? |
| Total | Portugal | | 93 | 24 | ? | ? | 0 | 0 | 9 | 1 | ? | ? |
| Total | South Korea | | ? | ? | ? | ? | ? | ? | | | ? | ? |
| Total | Japan | | 9 | 1 | 0 | 0 | 2 | 0 | | | 11 | 1 |
| Career total | | | ? | ? | ? | ? | ? | ? | 9 | 1 | ? | ? |

Note

^{1} Included 1 match in 2001 Supertaça Cândido de Oliveira
^{2} Unknown matches in 2007 Campeonato Alagoano
^{3} Unknown matches in 2007 Copa Pernambuco
^{4} Unknown matches in 2008 Campeonato Alagoano
^{5} 8 matches and 3 goals in Campeonato Paulista Série A2
^{6} Unknown matches 2009 Copa Governador do Estado da Bahia
^{7} 6 matches and 1 goal in 2010 Campeonato Goiano

== Honours ==
- Campeonato Paraibano: 2010
- Copa Governador Estado da Bahia: 2009
- Campeonato Alagoano: 2008
