= G.D. Lagoa =

Portuguese football club

- Full name: Grupo Desportivo da Lagoa
- Founded: 1971
- Ground: Estádio Capitão Josino da Costa; Lagoa, Algarve
- Capacity: 1,000
- Chairman: Luis Dias
- Manager: Nuno Costa
- League: Algarve Regional First League
- 2015–16: 2014–15, 4th
- Website: http://www.gdlagoa.com/

Grupo Desportivo da Lagoa, commonly known as Lagoa, is a Portuguese football club from the municipality of Lagoa. The club was founded in 1971. The club currently plays at the Estádio Capitão Josino da Costa which holds a seating capacity of 1000. The club currently plays in the Algarve League First Division after being relegated from the national Third Division in season 2012–2013.
