= Vilanovense F.C. =

Portuguese football club

Vilanovense
- Full name: Vilanovense Futebol Clube
- Founded: 1914
- Ground: Parque Soares dos Reis, Vila Nova de Gaia
- Capacity: 3.500
- Chairman: (Portugal) Dr. Rogério Santos
- Manager: (Portugal) Edmundo Duarte
- League: 1ª Divisão Distrital da AF Porto
- Website: http://www.vilanovense.pt/
Home colours	Away colours

Vilanovense Futebol Clube is a Portuguese football club based in Vila Nova de Gaia, Porto District. Their traditional kit consists in a striped black and red jersey, black shorts as well as black socks. An historic team from the Porto FA, they extinguished their senior football team due to financial debt. A new team Vila FC was created in 2010 to continue the club's traditions.

In the higher national division, one of the participation was the Terceira Divisão which was in the 1993–94 season (13th, 34 pts) and again in the 1994–95 season.

== Season to season ==
Season	Level	Division	Section	Place	Movements
1942–43	Tier 6	Distritais	AF Porto – 2ª Divisão	1st	
1943–44	Tier 5	Distritais	AF Porto – 1ª Divisão		
1953–54	Tier 6	Distritais	AF Porto – 2ª Divisão	1st	Promoted
1942–43	Tier 5	Distritais	AF Porto – 1ª Divisão		
1964–65	Tier 5	Distritais	AF Porto – 1ª Divisão	1st	Promoted
1970–71	Tier 5	Distritais	AF Porto – 1ª Divisão	1st	Promoted
1987–88	Tier 5	Distritais	AF Porto – 1ª Divisão	1st	Promoted
1992–93	Tier 5	Distritais	AF Porto – Divisão da Honra	1st	Promoted
1993–94	Tier 4	Terceira Divisão	Série B	13th	
1994–95	Tier 4	Terceira Divisão	Série B		

== Honours ==
- Campeão Distrital da Segunda Divisão da A. F. Porto:

- 1942/43, 1953/54

- Campeão Distrital da Primeira Divisão da A. F. Porto and Campeão Distrital da Divisão de Honra da A. F. Porto:

- 1964/65, 1970/71, 1987/88, 1992/93

- Taça de Honra do Porto: 1

- 1967–68
