= C.D. Paços de Brandão =

Portuguese football club

- Full name: Clube Desportivo de Paços de Brandão
- Founded: 1960
- Ground: Estádio Dona Zulmira Sá e Silva, Paços de Brandão, Santa Maria da Feira
- Capacity: 2,500
- Chairman: Januário Monteiro
- Manager: Fernando Cardoso
- League: AF Aveiro First Division
- 2011–12: AF Aveiro First Division, 11th

Clube Desportivo de Paços de Brandão commonly known as simply as Paços de Brandão is a Portuguese football club from Paços de Brandão, Santa Maria da Feira in the district of Aveiro. Founded in 1960, the club currently plays at the Estádio Dona Zulmira Sá e Silva which has a seating capacity of 2.500. The club is a member of the Aveiro Football Association. In its entire history, Paços de Brandão has won three major trophies: the AF Aveiro First Division in the 1971–72 season and two AF Aveiro Cups in the 1988–89 and 2004–05 seasons.
