= C.A. Valdevez =

Portuguese association football club

Clube Atlético dos Arcos
- Full name: Clube Atlético dos Arcos
- Founded: 1945-2009 and renewed in 2012
- Ground: Estádio Municipal da Coutada, Arcos Valdevez
- Capacity: 3,100
- Chairman: José Carlos Caçador Marinho
- Manager: Rui Peixoto
- League: Viana do Castelo Football Association 1st division
- 2025/26: Portuguese Second Division Serie A, 3rd

Clube Atlético de Valdevez known as CA Valdevez or Atlético dos Arcos is a Portuguese football club from Arcos Valdevez which was founded in 1945. The team ran into serious financial problems after the 2009–10 season and was stopped. They previously played in the Portuguese Second Division Serie A and finished in 3rd place during the 2007/08 season. They will continue to play their home games in 2012–13 in Estádio Municipal da Coutada with a capacity of 3,100.

The local town government, according to an article in an August weekly edition of the "Noticias dos Arcos", had donated 20,000 euros to help start the team's return to the districts league of Viana do Castelo. The schedule for 2012–13 has not yet been announced by the regional federation.

Prior to the club stopping, they successfully competed and during the 2008–09 Portuguese Cup they reached as far as the quarterfinals before losing in penalty kicks to First Division Club Nacional da Madeira. This match, which was moved from the Coutada Stadium to the new regional stadium in Melgaco, disappointed many followers who did not want to travel during a weekday to a remote location, which became necessary in order for it to be televised. Outside of hosting First Division Club Sport Lisboa e Benfica in a Portuguese Cup match in the early 1980s, the match against Nacional was the most important of the current generation.

There are various prominent alumni associated with the team, the biggest is former manager Jorge Casquilha (2007–08), who is currently managing First Division Newly Promoted Portuguese Club Moreirense. Other former alumni of the club include Pedro Tiba, Camora, Helder Cabral and Leandro Morais, the once manager of Atletico dos Arcos who achieved the two recent promotions with the club, is currently the assistant manager of the legendary and former champion of Portugal, Boavista.

The club president is José Carlos Caçador Marinho. Valdevez is sponsored by Seguravez, Oliveiros Group, and the Municipality of Arcos de Valdevez.

They were promoted in the 2016/2017 season to the district league of Viana do Castelo and played the Campeonato de Portugal Prio 2017/18 season. Atlético dos Arcos won the Regional Cup in 2015/16, the 2nd division cup in 2012/13, and earned 2nd place in the First Division District Cup in 2016/17. The main colors of the club are red and white. The alternative colors typically used are blue and yellow.

Although Atletico dos Arcos is a small team in relation to many other football clubs in Portugal, they do receive an incredible amount of support from immigrants spread all over the world including France, Canada, Switzerland, United States and Brazil.
