= C.D. Arrifanense =

Portuguese football club

Arrifanense
- Full name: Clube Desportivo Arrifanense
- Founded: 1931
- Ground: Estádio Maria Carolina Leite Resende Garcia, Arrifana, Santa Maria da Feira
- Capacity: 4,000
- Chairman: Carlos Oliveira

Clube Desportivo Arrifanense is a Portuguese football club from Arrifana, Santa Maria da Feira. Founded in 1931, the club currently plays at the Estádio Maria Carolina Leite Resende Garcia which holds a capacity of 4,000. The club is currently sponsored by Lacatoni and Ramitex.

== Honours ==
- AF Aveiro First Division
  - Winners (1): 1974–75
