= U.D. Santana =

Portuguese football club

- Full name: União Desportiva de Santana
- Founded: 1981
- Ground: Manuel Marques da Trindade, Santana, Madeira
- Capacity: 3.000
- Chairman: (Portugal) Rui Martins
- Manager: (Portugal) Paulo Abreu
- 2007–08: Terceira Divisão Serie E, 3rd (promoted)
Home colours

União Desportiva de Santana, known as Santana, is a Portuguese football club from Santana, Madeira. Founded in 1981, it currently holds home games at Manuel Marques da Trindade, with a capacity of 3,000 seats.

Santana was first promoted to the third category of Portuguese football in 2007–08. Santana were relegated back to the Terceira Divisão after gaining only 3 points in the 2009/10 season.

== Backroom staff ==
- (Portugal) Paulo Abreu – Manager
- (Portugal) David Batista – Assistant manager
- (Portugal) Zé Barreiras – Assistant manager
- (Portugal) Marcelino Andrade – Doctor
- (Portugal) Márcio Sousa – Masseur
- (Portugal) António Candelária – Chairman
- (Portugal) Rogério Gouveia – Vice-chairman
- (Portugal) Nélio Mendonça – Secretary
