= A.D. Portomosense =

Portuguese football club

Portomosense
- Full name: Associação Desportiva Portomosense
- Founded: 1974
- Ground: Estádio Parque de Jogos de Porto de Mós, Porto de Mós
- Capacity: 500
- Chairman: (Portugal) Nuno Moreira da Silva
- Manager: (Portugal) Hugo Almeida
- Coach: (Portugal) Pedro Cordeiro
- League: Portuguese 1.ª District Division
- Website: http://www.adportomosense.com
Home colours	Away colours

Associação Desportiva Portomosense is a Portuguese football club in Porto de Mós in the district of Leiria.

== Appearances ==
- Tier 3 (II Div. B): 2
- III Divisão: 13

== League history ==
	I	II	II B	III	AF	Pos.	Pl.	W	D	L	GS	GA	Diff.
2002–03				2		62 pts	32	17	11	4	66	33	+33
2003–04			19			39 pts	38	7	18	13	50	54	−4
2004–05				1		78 pts	34	23	9	2	60	26	+34
2005–06			11			27 pts	26	5	12	9	26	27	−1
2006–07			13			22 pts	26	4	10	12	21	44	−23
2007–08				8		40 pts	26	11	7	8	33	27	+6
2008–09					...	...	...	...	...	...	...	...	...
