= GD Beira-Mar =

Portuguese sports club

- Full name: Grupo Desportivo Beira-Mar
- Founded: 1950
- Ground: Monte Gordo

Grupo Desportivo Beira-Mar, usually called Beira-Mar de Monte Gordo is a Portuguese sports club from Monte Gordo.

The men's football team played in the Terceira Divisão from 2003 to 2011, except for a spell in the 2008–09 Segunda Divisão. The team also contested the Taça de Portugal during these years.
