= U.D. Tocha =

Portuguese sports club

- Full name: União Desportiva da Tocha
- Founded: 1953; 73 years ago
- Ground: Complexo Desportivo da Tocha, Tocha
- Capacity: 1000

União Desportiva da Tocha is a Portuguese sports club from Tocha.

The men's football team last finished 2nd in the Honra A AF Coimbra of 2019–20. The team was a mainstay in the Terceira Divisão from 2002 to 2012, when it contested the third-tier 2012–13 Segunda Divisão. From there, the team was relegated to the district league. In the Taça de Portugal, Tocha notably reached the fourth round in 2007–08.
