= Amatus Lusitanus =

Portuguese physician (1511–1568)

Amatus Lusitano
- Born: João Rodrigues de Castelo Branco; 1511; Castelo Branco, Kingdom of Portugal
- Died: 1568 (aged 56–57); Thessaloniki, Ottoman Empire
- Known for: Studies of blood circulation
- Scientific career
- Fields: Physician

João Rodrigues de Castelo Branco, better known as Amato Lusitano and Amatus Lusitanus (1511–1568), was a notable Portuguese Jewish physician of the 16th century. Like Herophilus, Galen, Ibn al-Nafis, Michael Servetus, Realdo Colombo and William Harvey, he is credited as making a discovery in the circulation of the blood. He is said to have discovered the function of the valves in the circulation of the blood.

== Life ==
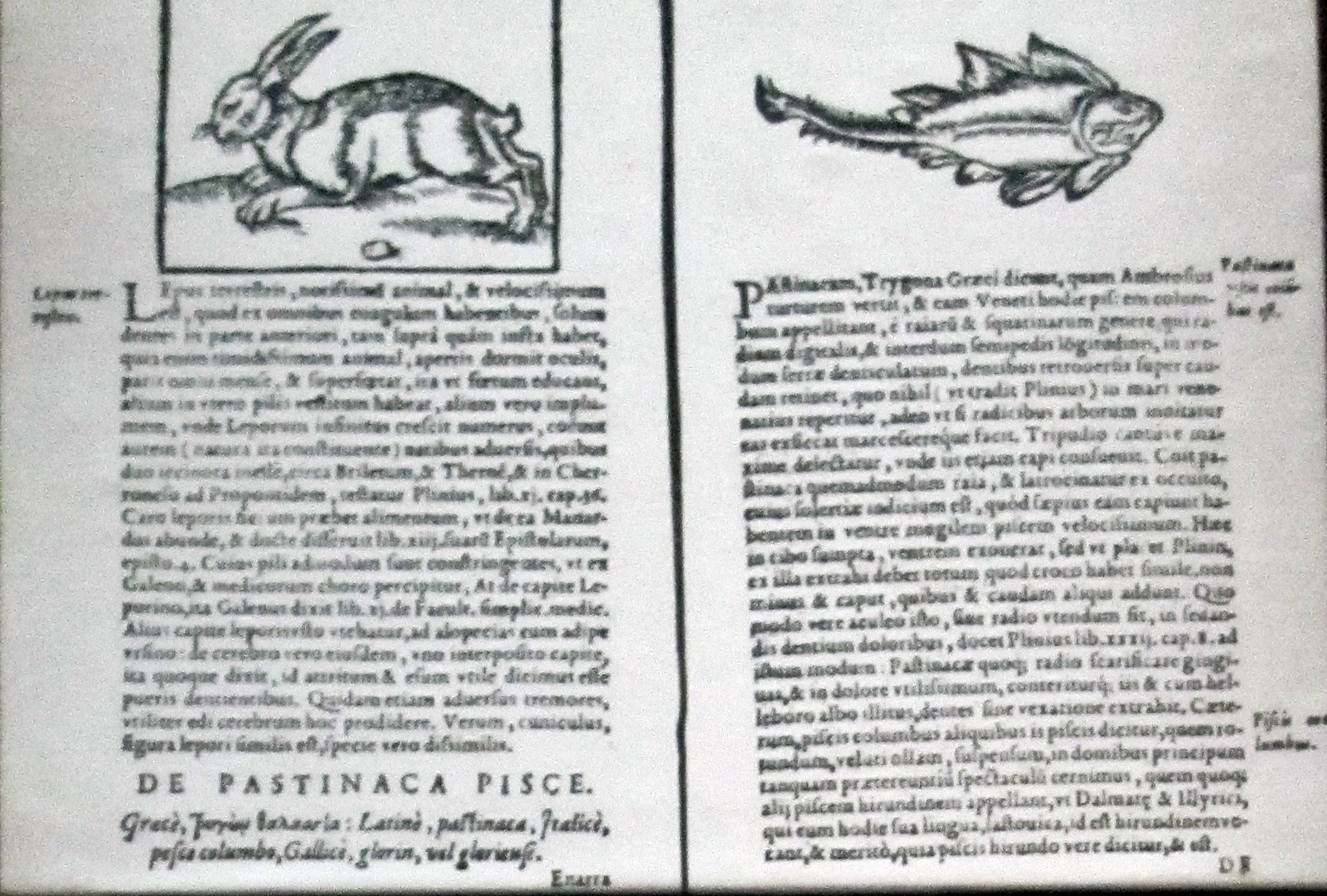
A page from In Dioscorides Enarationes

Lusitano was born in 1511 in Castelo Branco, Portugal. He was a descendant of a Marrano family called Chabib (= Amatus, "beloved" in Latin), and was brought up in the Jewish faith. After having graduated with honors as M.D. from the University of Salamanca, he was unable to return Portugal for fear of the Inquisition. He went to Antwerp for a time and then traveled through the Netherlands and France, finally settling in Italy. His reputation as one of the most skillful physicians of his time preceded him there, and during his short sojourn at Venice, where he came in contact with the physician and philosopher Jacob Mantino, he attended the niece of Pope Julius III and other distinguished personages.

In 1546, Amato was in Ferrara, at whose University he taught anatomy as an assistant to the physician Giambattista Canano and delivered lectures on medicinal plants. During one lecture, he dissected twelve cadavers – a great innovation at that time – in the presence of many scholars, among whom was the anatomist Jean Baptiste Cananus, who through his experience on this occasion was wrongly credited with the discovery of the function of the valves in the circulation of the blood. During his sojourn in Ferrara, which lasted for six years, Amatus Lusitanus received an invitation from the King of Poland to move to that country, which he declined, preferring to settle in Ancona, where religious tolerance existed.

Meanwhile, his reputation grew higher and higher. Jacoba del Monte, sister of Pope Julius III, was one of his patients; and he prescribed also for Julius himself, to whose sick-bed he was later summoned.

With the accession of Paul IV, Amatus underwent all the sufferings which the Marranos of Ancona had to endure from this pope. He took refuge in Pesaro, leaving behind him all his possessions, including several manuscript works, the loss of which he greatly deplored. One of these manuscripts, however, the fifth part of his Centuriæ, was later restored to him and published. During his sojourn at Pesaro he received an invitation from the Ragusan Republic, After staying for some months he left the city for Thessaloniki, which then had a large Jewish community and was part of the Ottoman Empire; there he openly professed the Jewish faith and finally died in 1568.

== Work ==
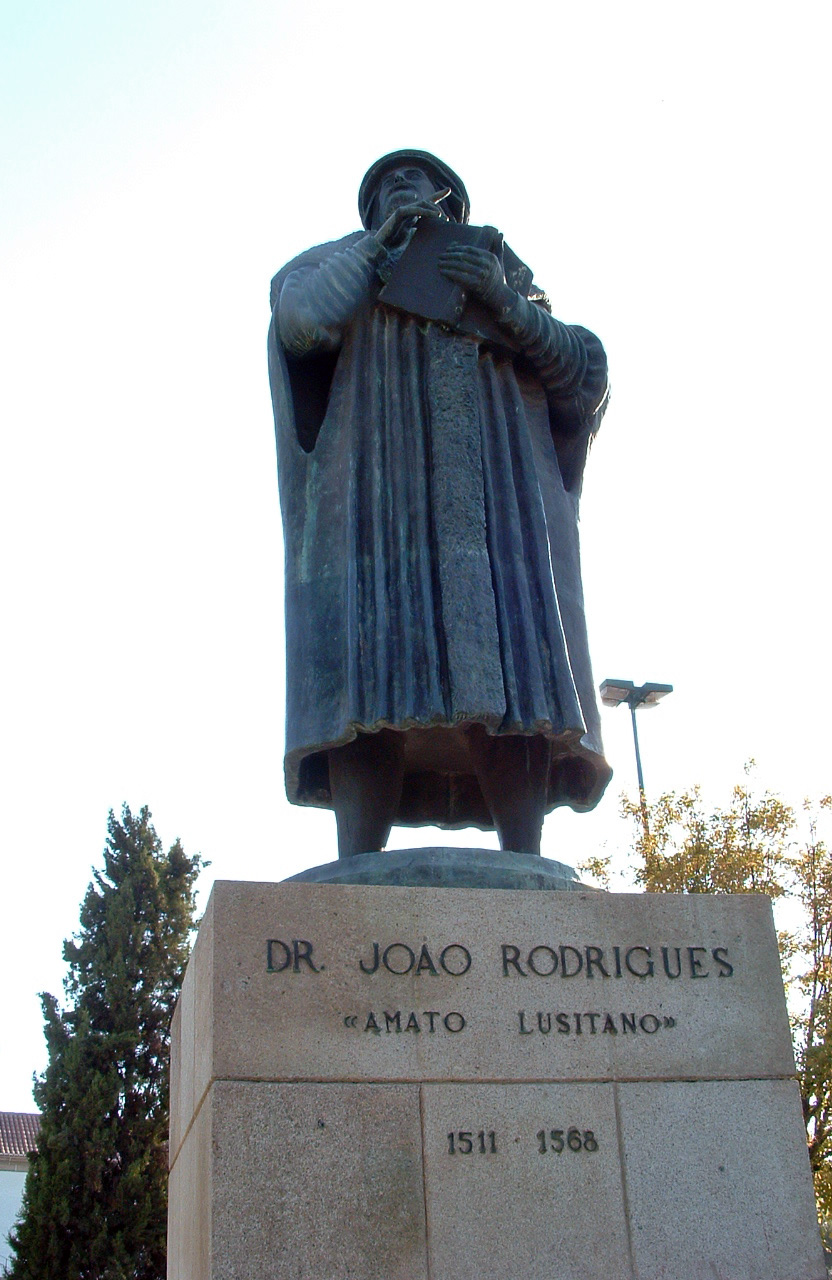
Statue of Amato Lusitano in his hometown Castelo Branco.

He discovered the circulation of the blood, and through dissections of the Azygos vein, he was the first to observe and speculate about the venous valves found there.

This discovery contradicted the conventional belief of the time that the blood flows from the heart via the arteries as well as the veins. It is obvious that this hypothesis was supported by the fact that the network of arteries and veins becomes thinner and thinner as they get farther from the heart. It was also assumed that the networks are not connected, so the blood cannot pass from one network to the other. (The microscope was not yet invented, so one could not view capillary arteries without aid.)

Dr. Amatus Lusitanus described in the Centuria I, paragraph (Curatio) 513, how, in 1547, he performed an experiment before some scholars from the University of Ferrara. He blew air into the lower part of the azygos, and showed that the vena cava would not be inflated. It was not possible for the air to escape because of the valve or operculum mentioned. When it is clear that if air cannot pass out of the azygos into the vena cava, it is all the more certain that blood, much thicker than air, could not flow through. In the audience was "the admirable anatomist” Giambattista Canano, to whom the discovery of the valves was attributed later by mistake.

Amatus enriched medical literature with several valuable works which for a long time enjoyed the highest reputation. Among these the most important was his Centuriæ, in which he published accounts of his cases and their treatment. This work, in seven volumes, entitled Curationum Medicinalium Centuriæ Septem, passed through a number of editions (Florence, 1551; Venice, 1552, 1557, 1560, 1653; Basel, 1556; Leyden, 1560, 1570; Paris, 1620; Bordeaux, 1620; Barcelona, 1628). His other works were: Index Dioscoridis (1536); Enegemata in Duos Priores Dioscoridis de Arte Medica Libros (Antwerp, 1536); In Dioscorides de Medica materia Librum quinque enarrationis (1556); Commentatio de Introitu Medici ad Ægrotantem, (Venice, 1557); De Crisi et Diebus Decretoriis, (Venice, 1557); In Dioscoridis Anazarbei de Medica Materia Libros Quinque, (Venice, 1557; Leyden, 1558); Enarrationes Eruditissimæ, (Venice, 1553); La Historia de Eutropio (Eutropius translated into Spanish); commentary on the first book of Avicenna's Canon, which, as he relates in the preface to the seventh Centuria, he lost among his possessions at Ancona.
