= Castelo Branco, Portugal =

Castelo Branco
- Municipality
- City of Castelo Branco
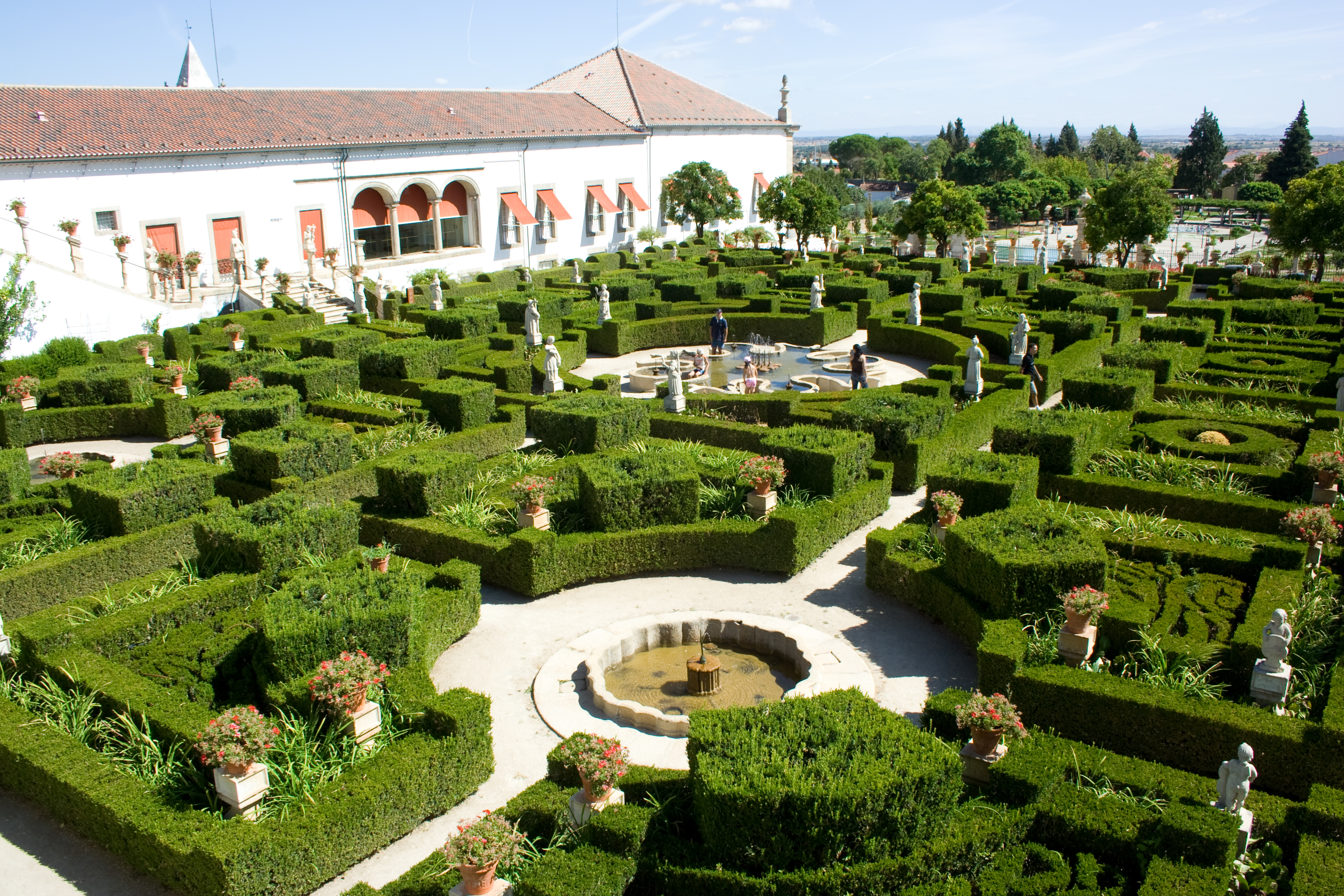
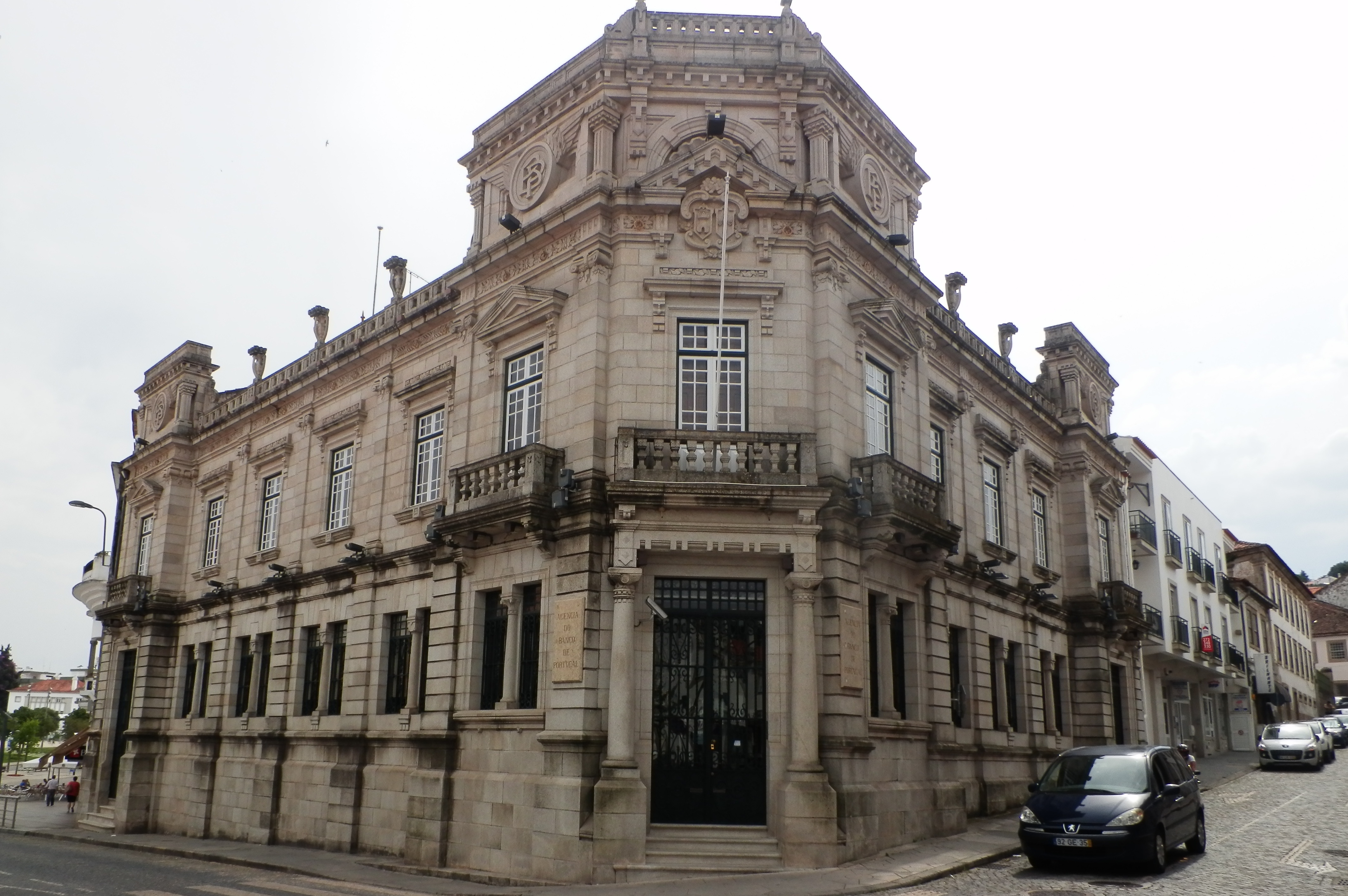
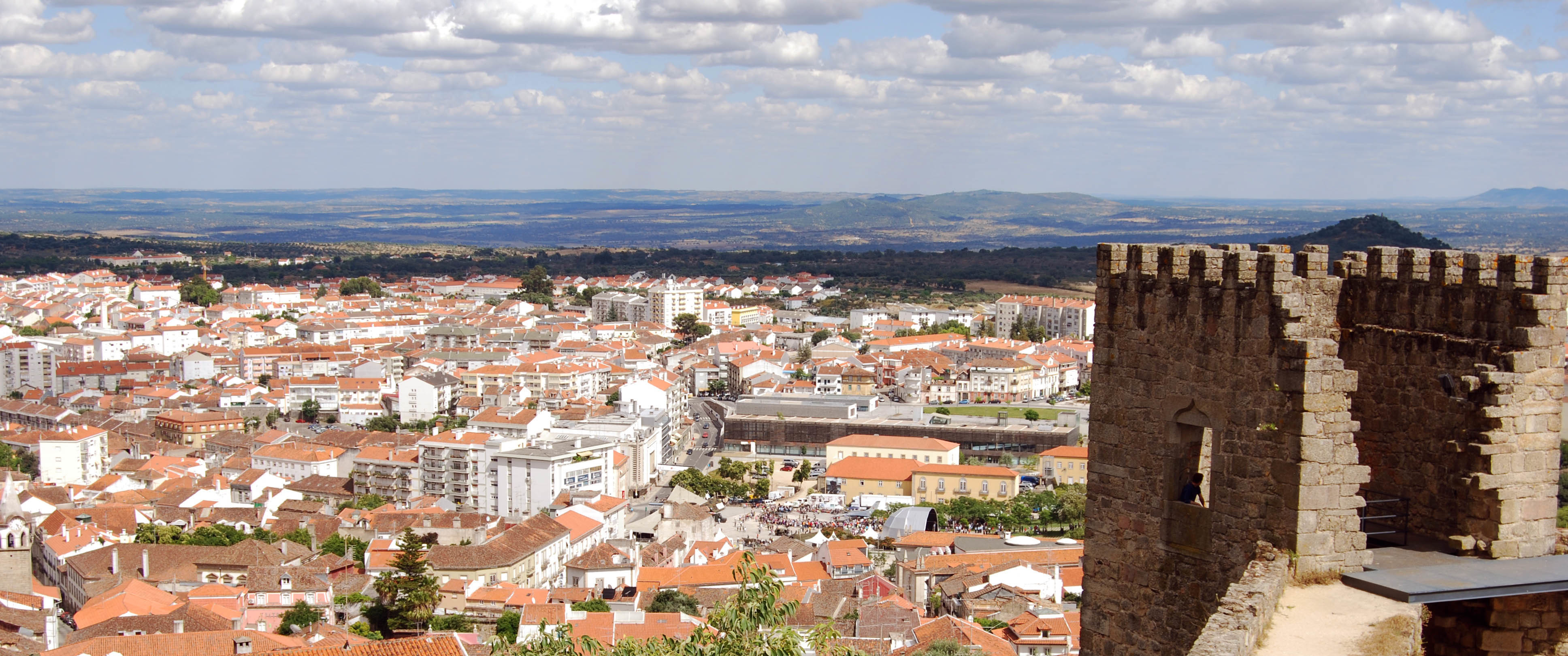
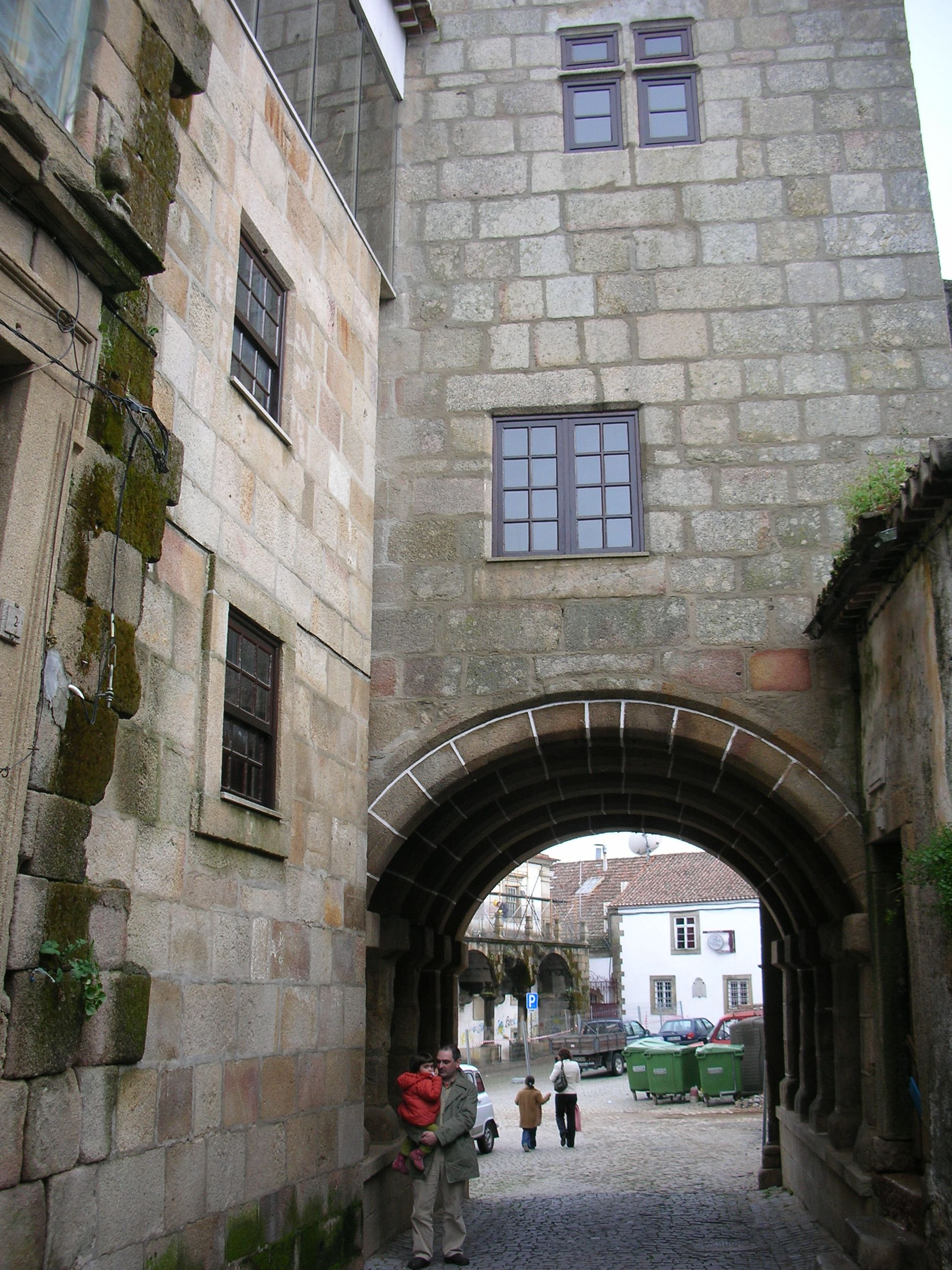
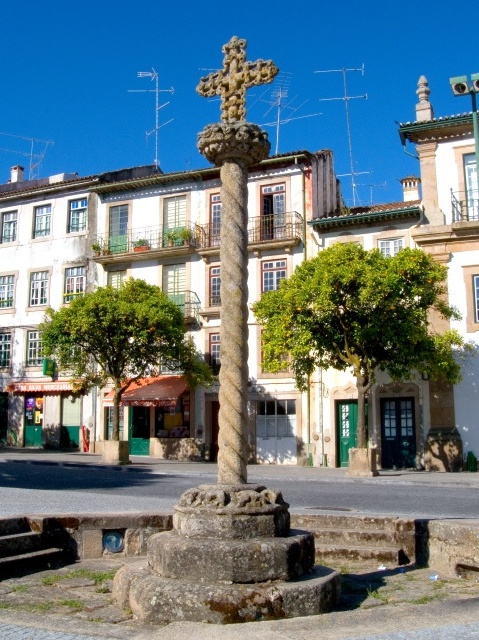
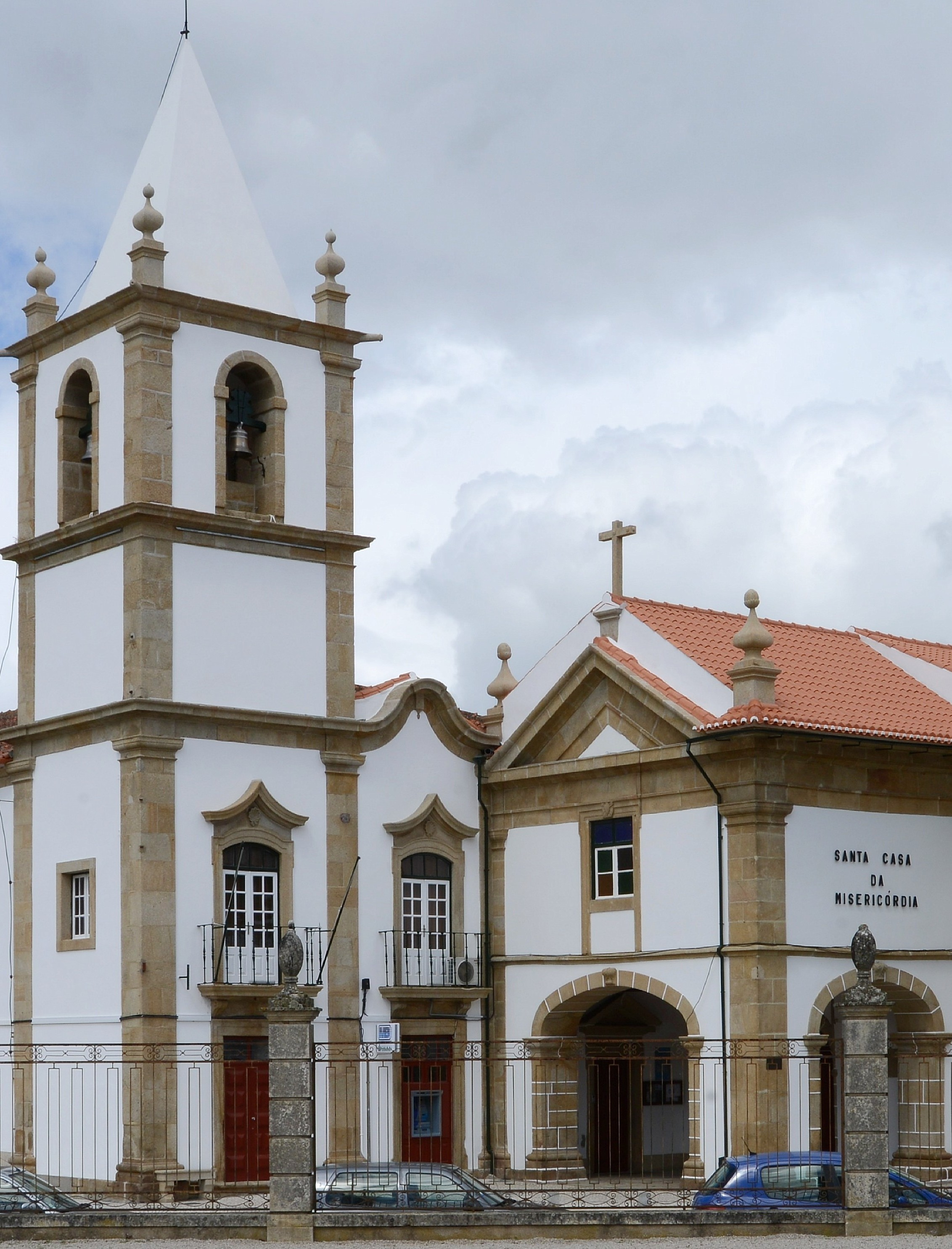
- Gardens of the Ancient Bishop's Palace, Agência do Banco de Portugal, View of Castelo Branco from the castle, Bishop Arch, Cross in the center, Convento da Graça

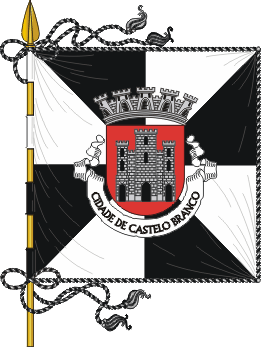
- Flag Coat of arms
- Interactive map of Castelo Branco
- Location in Portugal
- Coordinates: 39°49′N 7°30′W
- Country: Portugal
- Region: Centro
- Intermunic. comm.: Beira Baixa
- District: Castelo Branco
- Parishes: 19

Government
  - President: Leopoldo Rodrigues (PS)

Area
  - Total: 1,438.19 km^{2} (555.29 sq mi)

Population (2021)
  - Total: 52,291
  - Density: 36.359/km^{2} (94.169/sq mi)
- Time zone: UTC+00:00 (WET)
  - Summer (DST): UTC+01:00 (WEST)
- Website: www.cm-castelobranco.pt

Castelo Branco (European Portuguese pronunciation: [kɐʃˈtɛlu ˈβɾɐ̃ku]), officially the City of Castelo Branco (Portuguese: Cidade de Castelo Branco), is an inland city and municipality in Central Portugal. It has 34,455 inhabitants in its urban area (2021) and is the seat of the district of the same name. The municipality, with 52,272 inhabitants, is made up of 19 freguesias (civil parishes) spread through 1,438.19 km^{2} (555.29 sq mi), making it the 3rd largest municipality in Portugal by total land area.

The municipality is bounded in the north by Fundão, in the east by Idanha-a-Nova, in the south by Spain, in the southwest by Vila Velha de Ródão, and in the west by Proença-a-Nova and Oleiros.

== History ==
Castelo Branco gets its name from the prior existence of a Luso-Roman castrum (fortified settlement) called Castra Leuca, on the summit of the hill of Colina da Cardosa. The population grew on the slopes of this hill.

Little is known of the settlement's history before 1182. There is, nevertheless, a document from this date mentioning the donation to the Knights Templar of a piece of land called Vila Franca da Cardosa, by a noble, Fernandes Sanches. In 1213, it obtained a foral granting it autonomy, and the name Castel-Branco appears for the first time. Pope Innocent III confirmed this in 1215, giving it the name of Castelo Branco.

It was around this time that the Templars built the walls and the castle.

Historically, Castelo Branco was home to a Jewish community, until its forced conversion. After 1496, Castelo Branco became an important center for marranos, Jews who had converted to Christianity publicly but still practiced Judaism secretly. These practices continued for hundreds of years, until the 1920s, when many descendants of Marranos returned to practicing Judaism openly and more traditionally. The local museum in Castelo Branco contains a stone with a Hebrew language inscription from the synagogue of Belmonte, dated to the year 1297.

In 1510, a new foral was conceded by King Manuel I, and in 1642 the town acquired the status of Vila de Castelo Branco.

In 1771, Castelo Branco became a city and a bishopric (see below) until 1881.

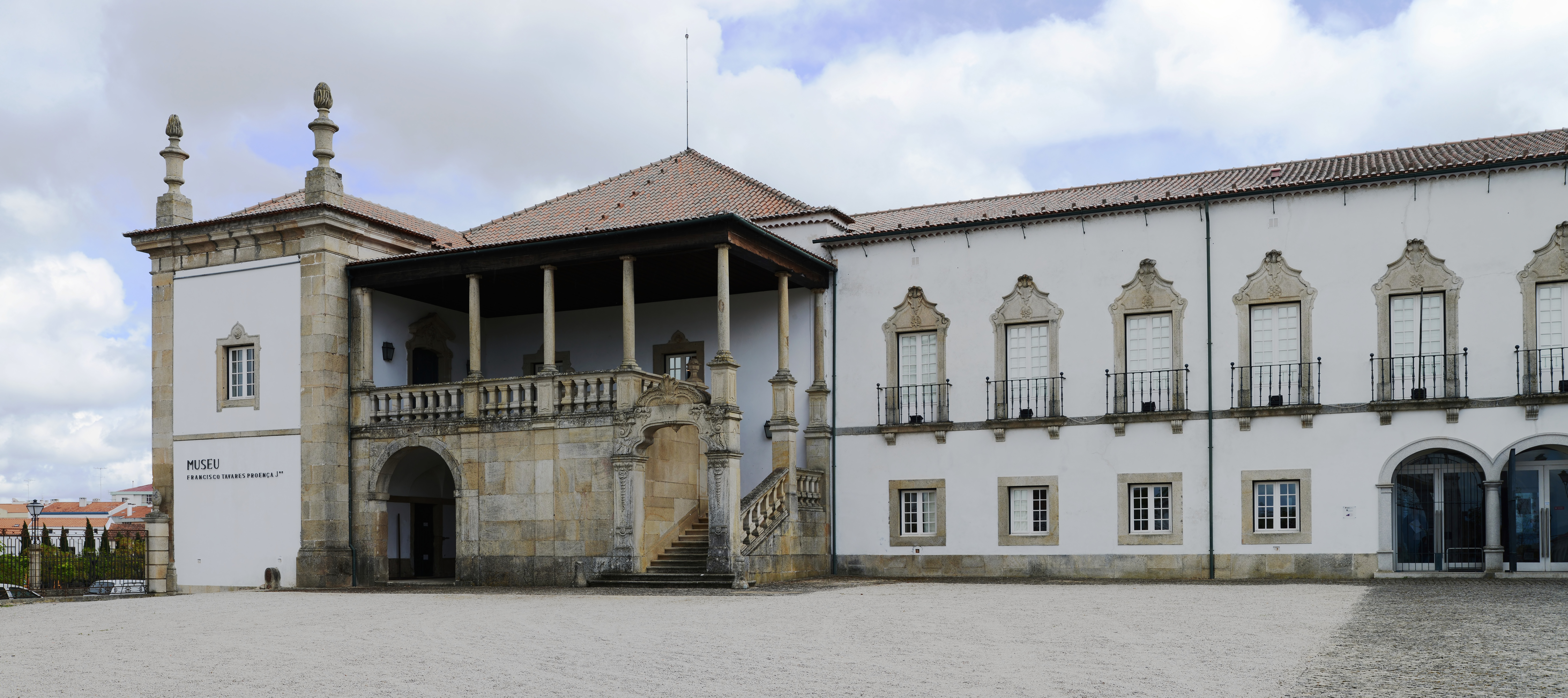
Museum Francisco Tavares Proença Júnior, former bishop's palace

In 1858, a telegraph line was opened between Abrantes and Castelo Branco, and in 1860, the city received its first public lighting.

In 1959, it became the capital of the district of the same name.

== Ecclesiastical history ==
Pope Clement XIV created the diocese of Castelo Branco on 1771-06-07.

On 1881-09-30, it was suppressed and its territory merged into the then Diocese of Portalegre, which adopted its title and became the present Diocese of Portalegre-Castelo Branco, making the former Cathedral of Castelo Branco (dedicated to St. Michael the Archangel) its Co-cathedral.

Castelo Branco has had the following residential Bishops:

- José de Jesus Maria Caetano, Dominican Order (Order of Preachers, O.P.) (1771 – death 1782-07-13)
- Vicente Ferreira da Rocha, O.P. (1782-12-16 – death 1814-08-25)
- Bishop-elect Patrício da Silva, Augustinian Order (O.E.S.A.) (1818 – 1819-05-03), later Metropolitan Archbishop of Évora (Portugal) ([1819-05-03] 1820-02-21 – 1826-03-13), created Cardinal-Priest with no Title assigned (1824-09-27 – 1840-01-03), promoted Patriarch of Lisboa (Portugal) (1826-03-13 – death 1840-01-03)
- Joaquim José de Miranda Coutinho (1819-05-03 – death 1831-04-06)
- Guilherme Henriques de Carvalho (1846 – death 1857-11-15), also Apostolic Administrator of Portalegre (Portugal) (1846 – 1857-11-15), created Cardinal-Priest of S. Maria sopra Minerva (1854-11-30 – 1857-11-15); previously Bishop of Leiria (Portugal) ([1840] 1843-04-03 – 1845-11-24), Patriarch of Lisboa (Portugal) (1845-11-24 – 1857-11-15)

== Places of interest ==
The most important monument in Castelo Branco is the Jardim do Paço Episcopal (Garden of the Episcopal Palace). It is one of the most beautiful Baroque gardens in Portugal and contains statues of allegories, kings, and zodiacal signs arranged around ponds, terraces, and staircases.

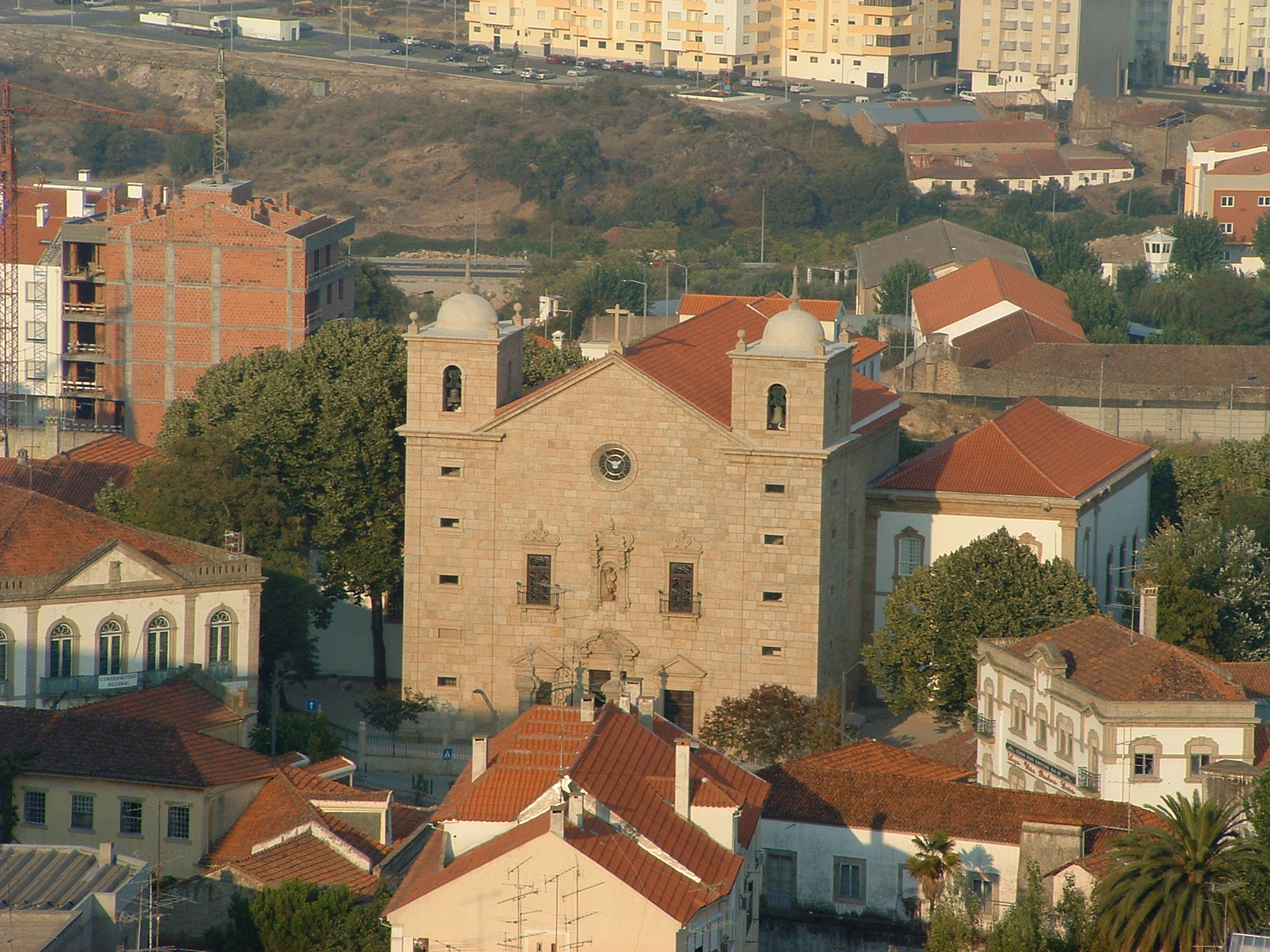
Co-cathedral St.Michael

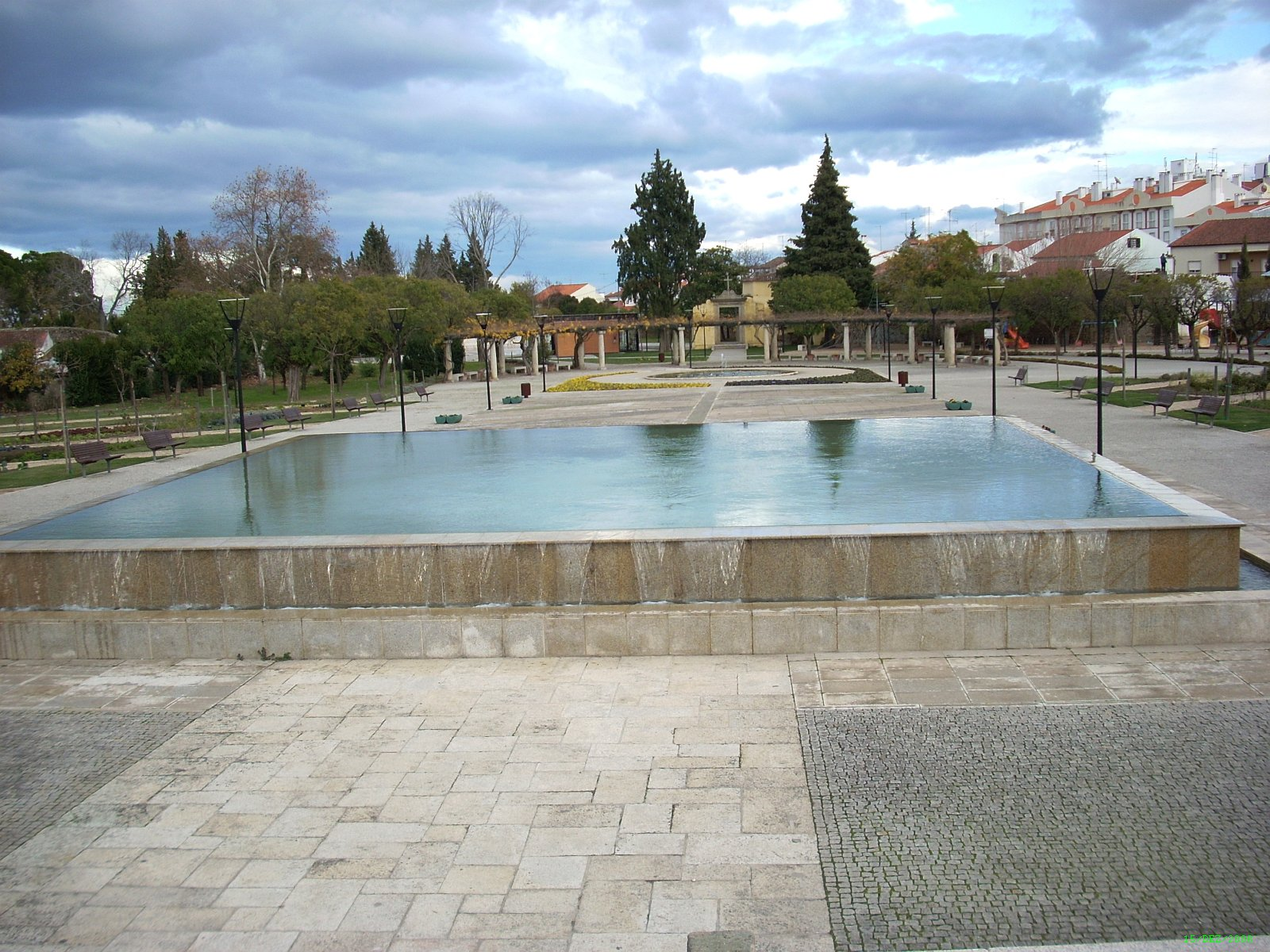
City's Park

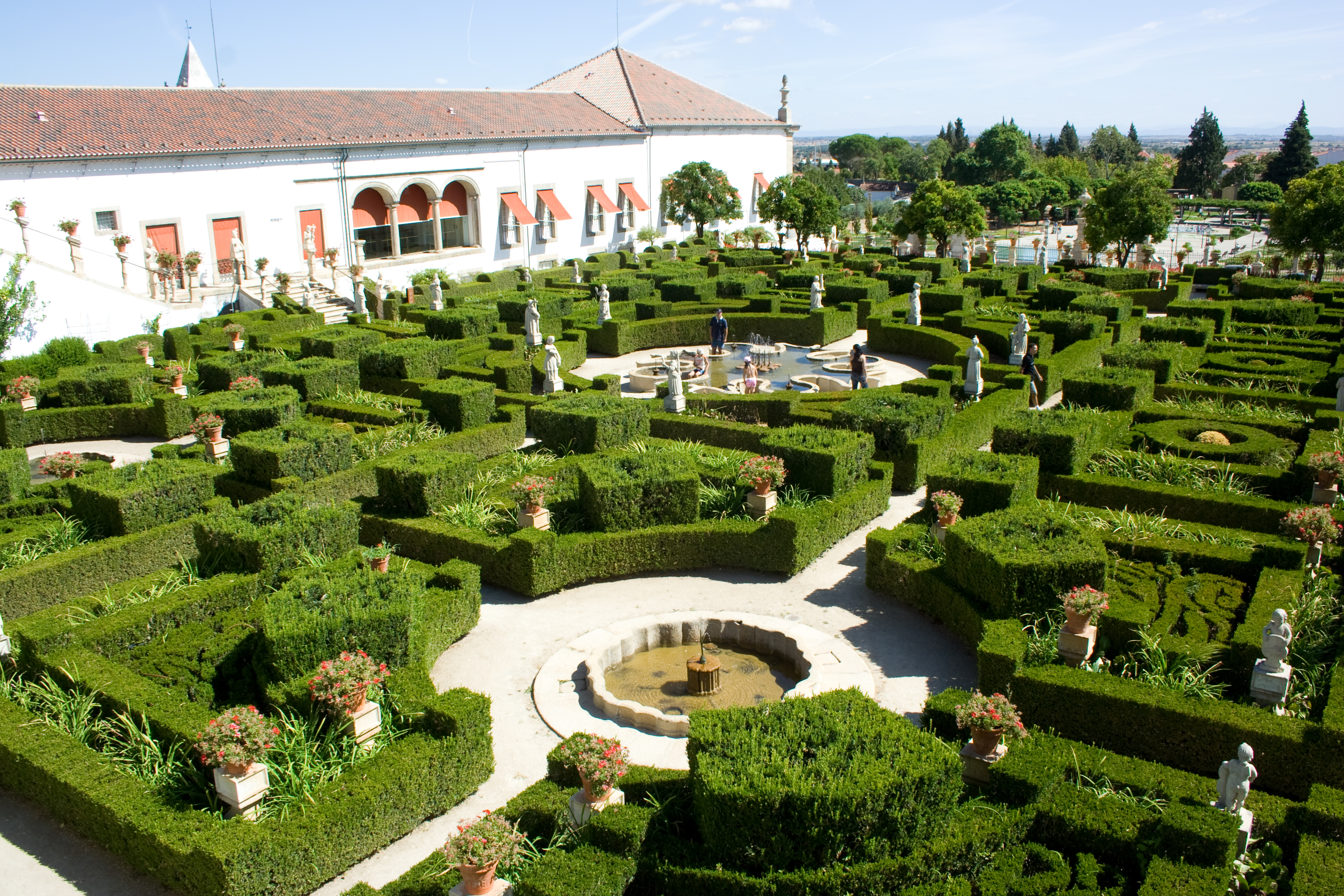
City's Garden

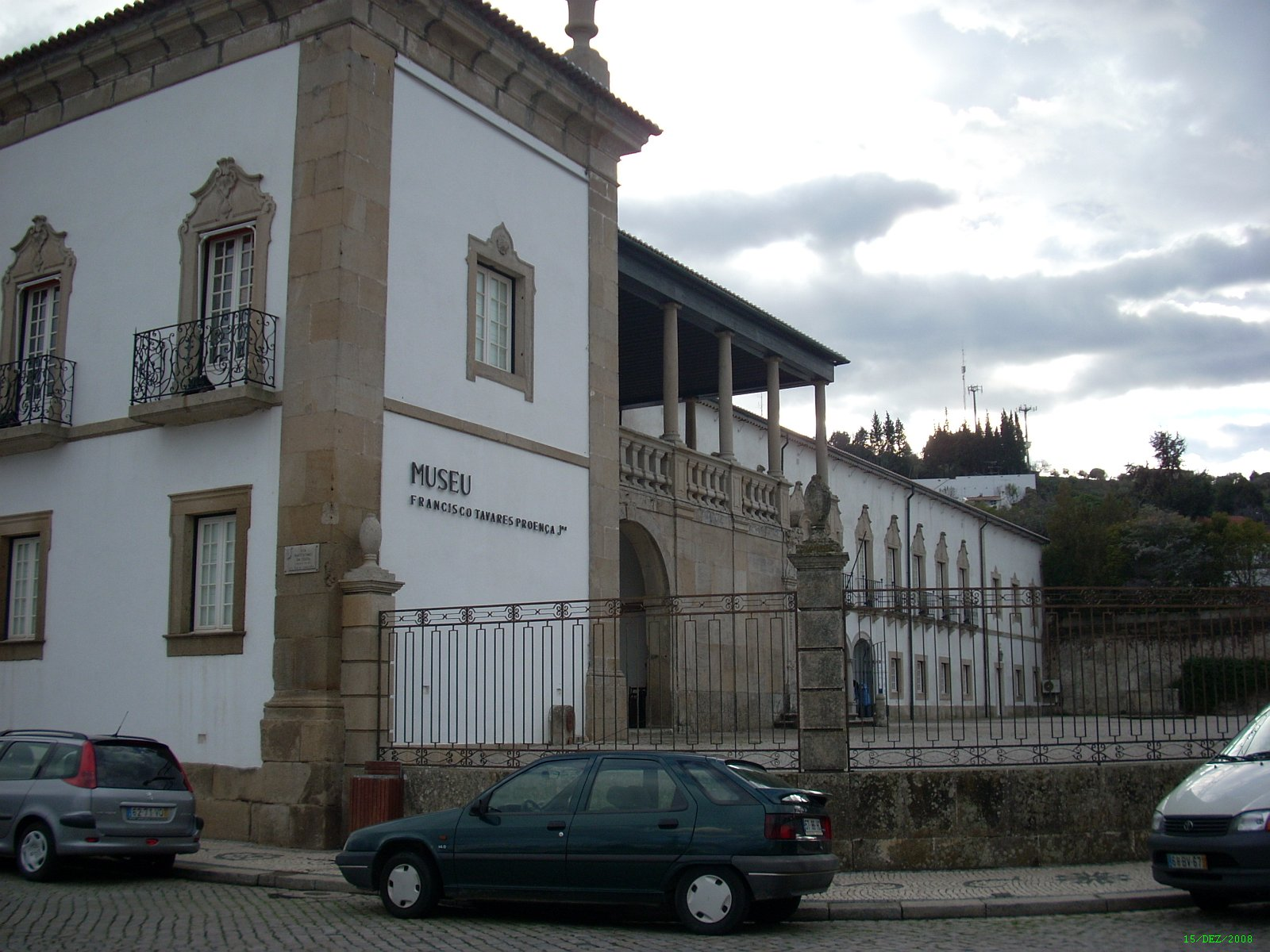
Museum "Francisco Tavares Proença Júnior"

== Civil parishes ==
Administratively, the municipality is divided into 19 civil parishes (freguesias):

- Alcains
- Almaceda
- Benquerenças
- Castelo Branco
- Cebolais de Cima e Retaxo
- Escalos de Baixo e Mata
- Escalos de Cima e Lousa
- Freixial do Campo e Juncal do Campo
- Lardosa
- Louriçal do Campo
- Malpica do Tejo
- Monforte da Beira
- Ninho do Açor e Sobral do Campo
- Póvoa de Rio de Moinhos e Cafede
- Salgueiro do Campo
- Santo André das Tojeiras
- São Vicente da Beira
- Sarzedas
- Tinalhas

== Climate ==
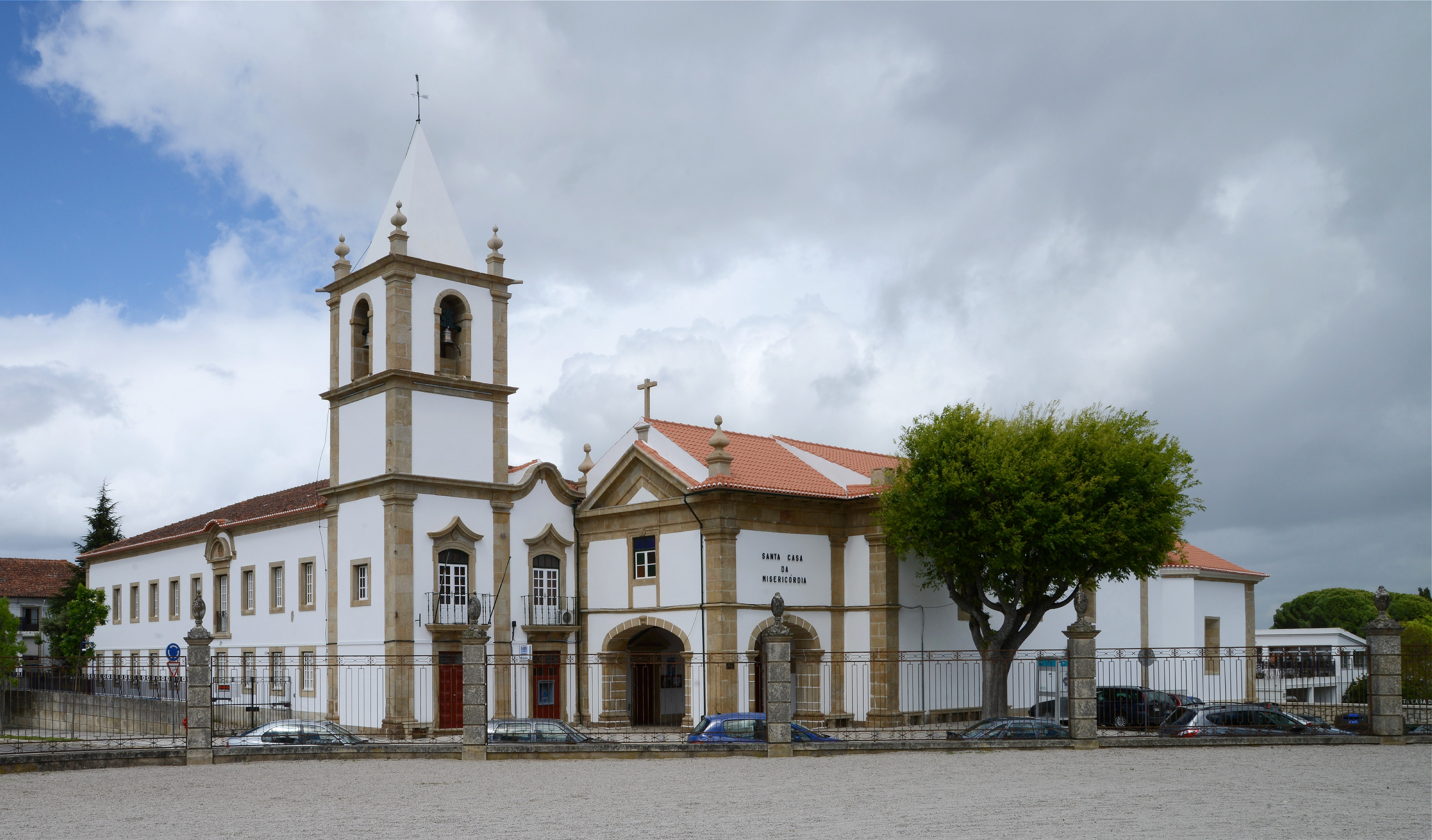
The Convent and church of Graça

Castelo Branco has a hot-summer mediterranean climate. Its summers are among the hottest of Portugal, influenced by its inland position. Winters are mild with cool nights, with an average of 28 days with frost per year. Inland areas further south in the country have hotter temperature extremes, although averages are very similar. There is somewhat of a seasonal lag in summer, since September is significantly warmer than May despite having less daylight. Winter temperatures are more consistent with the daylight cycle, since temperatures drop sharply in autumn months.

Climate data for Castelo Branco, 1991-2020 normals and 1981-2022 extremes, altitude: 386 m (1,266 ft)
Month	Jan	Feb	Mar	Apr	May	Jun	Jul	Aug	Sep	Oct	Nov	Dec	Year
Record high °C (°F)	25.4 (77.7)	23.2 (73.8)	27.5 (81.5)	30.0 (86.0)	35.5 (95.9)	41.3 (106.3)	42.6 (108.7)	43.5 (110.3)	41.4 (106.5)	34.5 (94.1)	25.2 (77.4)	20.2 (68.4)	43.5 (110.3)
Mean daily maximum °C (°F)	12.3 (54.1)	14.2 (57.6)	17.4 (63.3)	19.4 (66.9)	23.4 (74.1)	28.7 (83.7)	32.5 (90.5)	32.5 (90.5)	27.9 (82.2)	21.7 (71.1)	15.8 (60.4)	12.7 (54.9)	21.5 (70.8)
Daily mean °C (°F)	8.3 (46.9)	9.6 (49.3)	12.3 (54.1)	14.1 (57.4)	17.6 (63.7)	21.9 (71.4)	24.9 (76.8)	25.1 (77.2)	21.7 (71.1)	16.9 (62.4)	11.8 (53.2)	8.9 (48.0)	16.1 (61.0)
Mean daily minimum °C (°F)	4.2 (39.6)	5.0 (41.0)	7.3 (45.1)	8.8 (47.8)	11.7 (53.1)	15.0 (59.0)	17.4 (63.3)	17.7 (63.9)	15.4 (59.7)	12.1 (53.8)	7.8 (46.0)	5.1 (41.2)	10.6 (51.1)
Record low °C (°F)	−3.9 (25.0)	−2.6 (27.3)	−4.8 (23.4)	0.4 (32.7)	2.9 (37.2)	7.3 (45.1)	8.9 (48.0)	9.3 (48.7)	6.2 (43.2)	2.7 (36.9)	−2.4 (27.7)	−3.4 (25.9)	−4.8 (23.4)
Average precipitation mm (inches)	87.6 (3.45)	66.5 (2.62)	70.9 (2.79)	65.1 (2.56)	53.8 (2.12)	17.4 (0.69)	6.9 (0.27)	6.7 (0.26)	39.4 (1.55)	114.9 (4.52)	110.7 (4.36)	104.5 (4.11)	744.4 (29.3)
Average precipitation days (≥ 1 mm)	8.9	6.6	7.4	7.5	6.1	2.4	1.0	1.3	4.0	8.7	8.6	8.7	71.2
Average relative humidity (%)	80	73	61	62	59	49	41	43	53	69	78	83	63
Mean monthly sunshine hours	151.9	167.6	242.9	232.2	268.1	316.1	355.4	335.2	252.1	195.7	154.0	123.4	2,794.6
Source 1: Instituto de Meteorologia
Source 2: Instituto de Meteorologia (sunshine hours) (humidity)

== Economy ==
The city is home to Centauro, a company which produces industrial coolers, refrigerators, and freezers. The Portuguese subsidiary of Danone has a factory in Castelo Branco, which produces Danone's dairy products for the entire Iberian Peninsula. The district of Castelo Branco is also famed for the Castelo Branco cheese.

Delphi Packard is a major factory and principal employer in the area, with more than 1000 workers. The factory makes automobile components for major automobile constructors such as Ferrari.

Shopping malls in Castelo Branco include Alegro and Fórum.

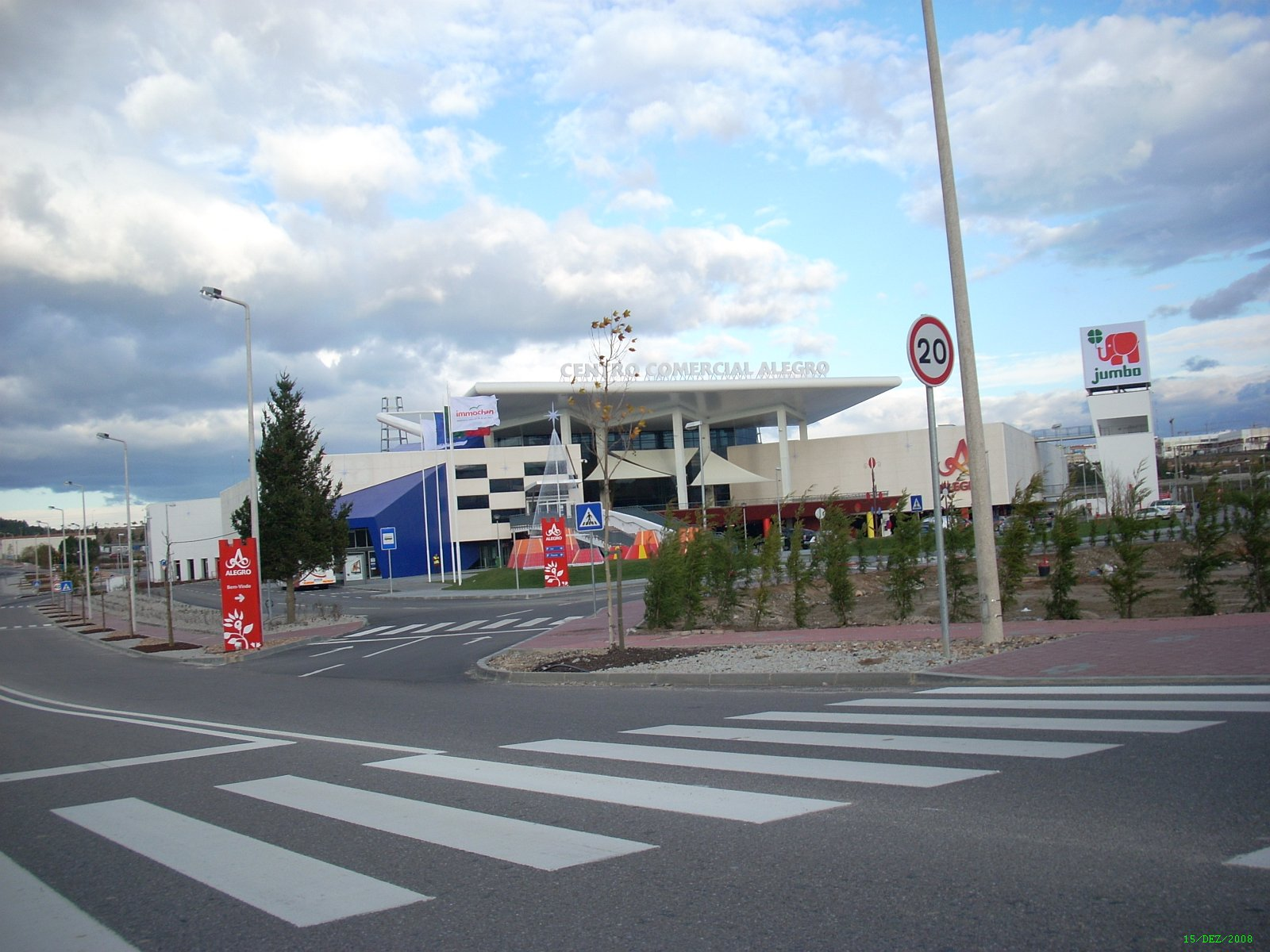
Alegro shopping mall (South view)

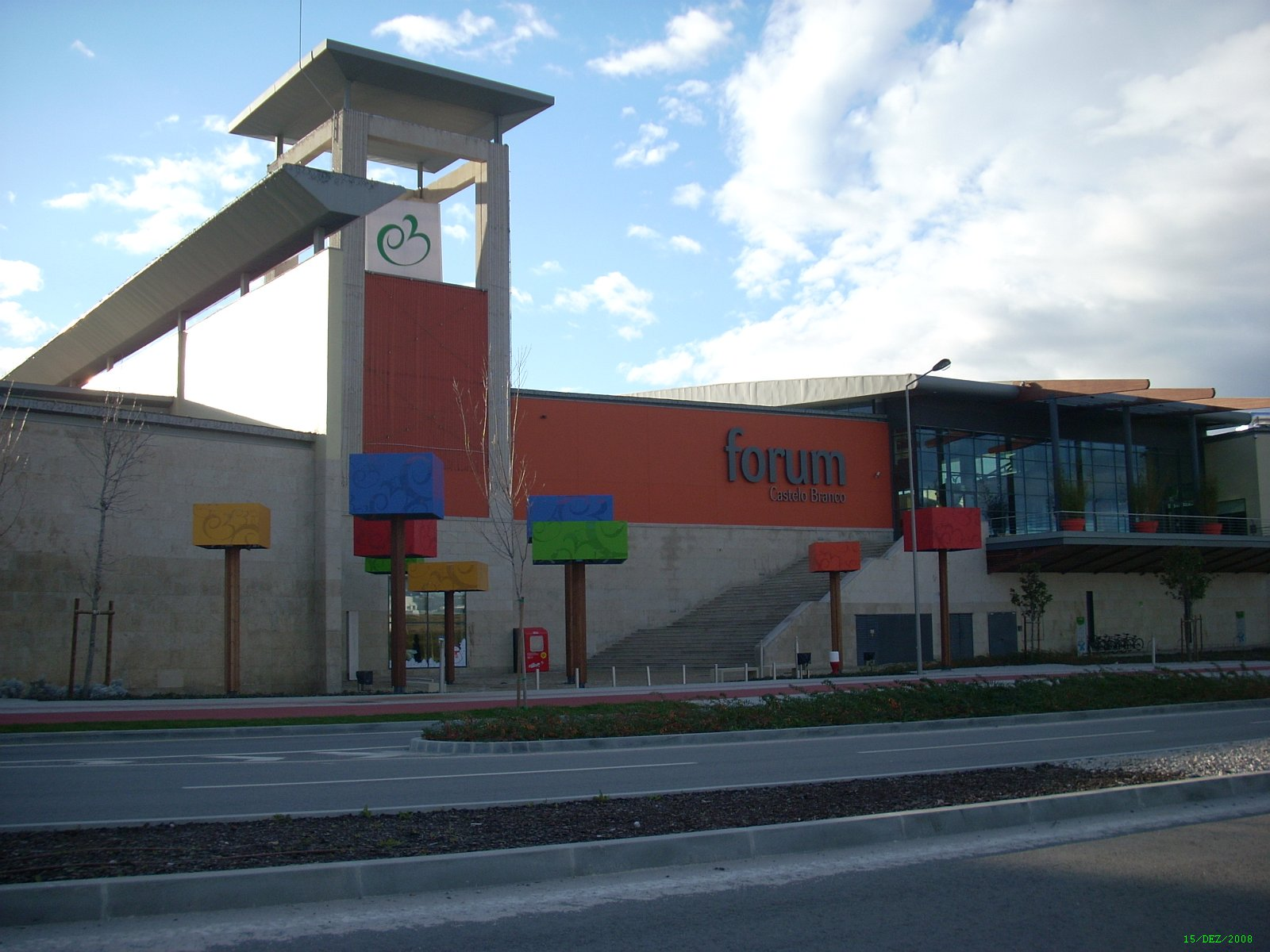
Fórum shopping mall in Castelo Branco (East view)

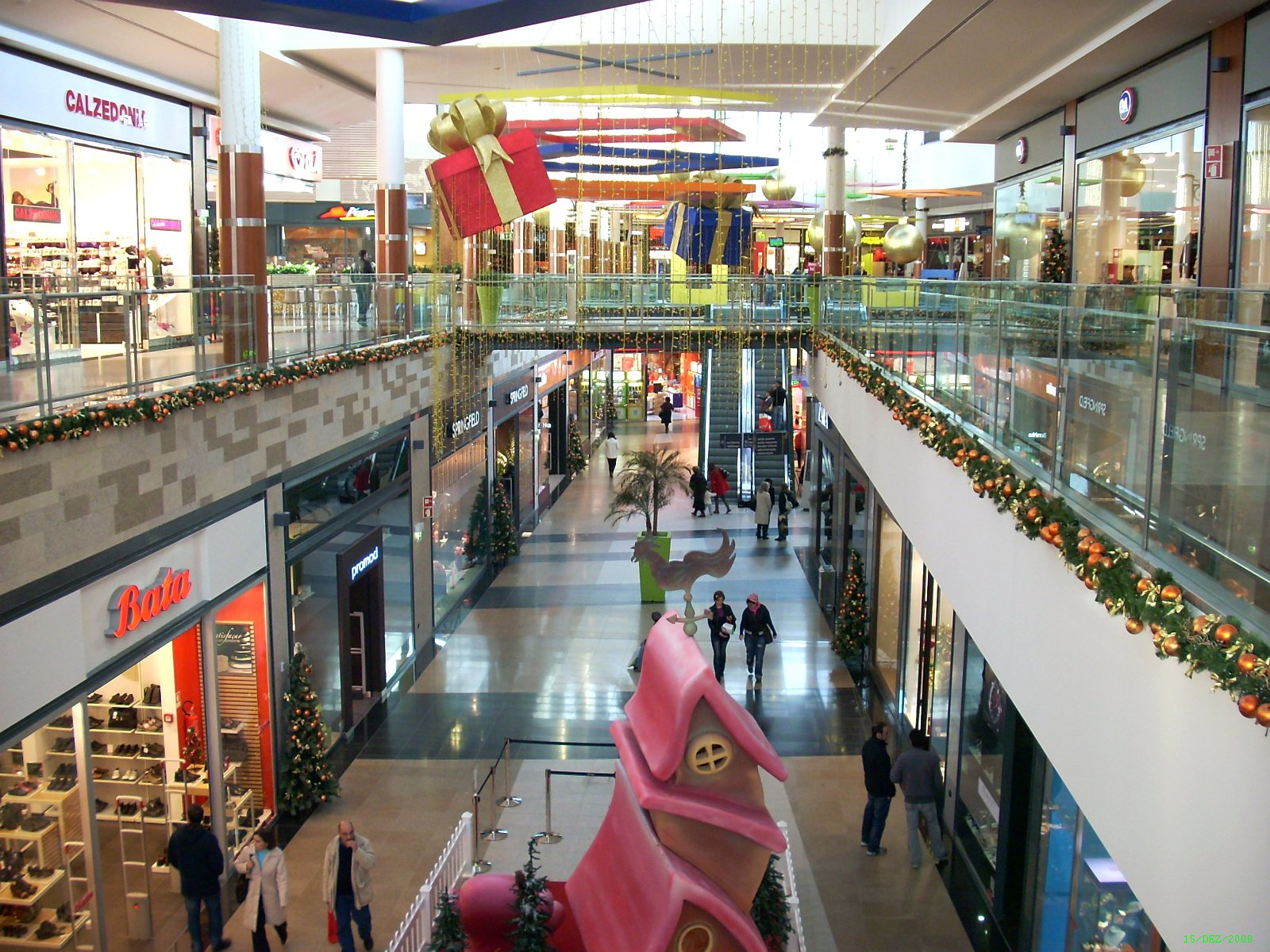
Fórum shopping mall in Castelo Branco city (North inside view)

== Education ==
Castelo Branco is home to the Instituto Politécnico de Castelo Branco, a state-run polytechnic institute of higher education, comprising schools of agriculture, technology, management, education, art, and health.

== Transportation ==
Railways: Castelo Branco is the principal station located some 100 kilometres (62 miles) up the Beira Baixa Railway Line from Entroncamento to Guarda. It runs via Abrantes, Rodão, Castelo Branco, and Fundão with services currently terminating at Covilhã some 30 kilometres (19 miles) short of Guarda. Rail services are operated by CP - Comboios de Portugal (Portuguese Trains) and consist of three stopping trains (Regionais) and three fast trains (Intercidades) per day from Lisbon via Entroncamento. The fast trains take less than 3 hours to reach Castelo Branco from Lisbon's Santa Apolonia and Lisbon Oriente main stations. Stopping trains are considerably slower.

From Entroncamento, the route branches off the Lisbon to Porto main line onto the Beira Baixa line following the mighty Tagus river, crossing it twice on impressively long bridges. From Abrantes, a series of reservoirs come into view. For lengthy stretches, the single track clings to the NW flanks of the reservoirs, providing forested views as the train speeds along the waterside. The services are operated by comfortable and purposeful "Iberian Gauge" (5ft6in) 25 kV electric multiple units. After passing through some deep gorges into Rodao station, the line then heads north, away from the river and on to Castelo Branco, and finally Covilhã.

From Covilhã northwards to Guarda, trains were operated by more leisurely diesel motorcars. This scenic stretch of mountainous rural line provides the strategic last leg of the Beira Baixa Railway, linking it to Guarda via Belmonte. However, in recent years it has been closed for modernisation and electrification. The partially completed works, originally due for completion in 2011, are still on hold as of 2014 due to serious funding issues associated with the economy, which cuts off otherwise direct rail options from Castelo Branco to destinations north of Covilhã.

== Notable people ==
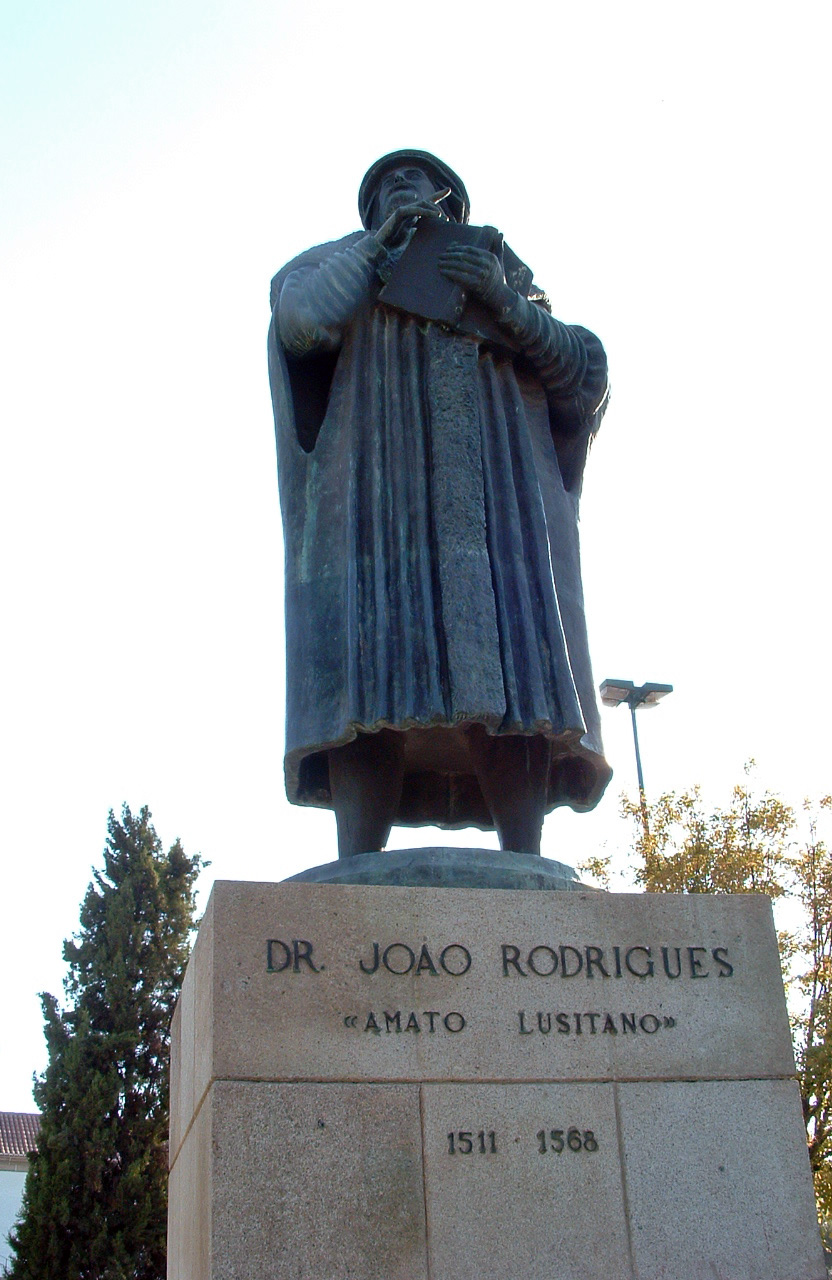
Statue of Amato Lusitano in his hometown of Castelo Branco

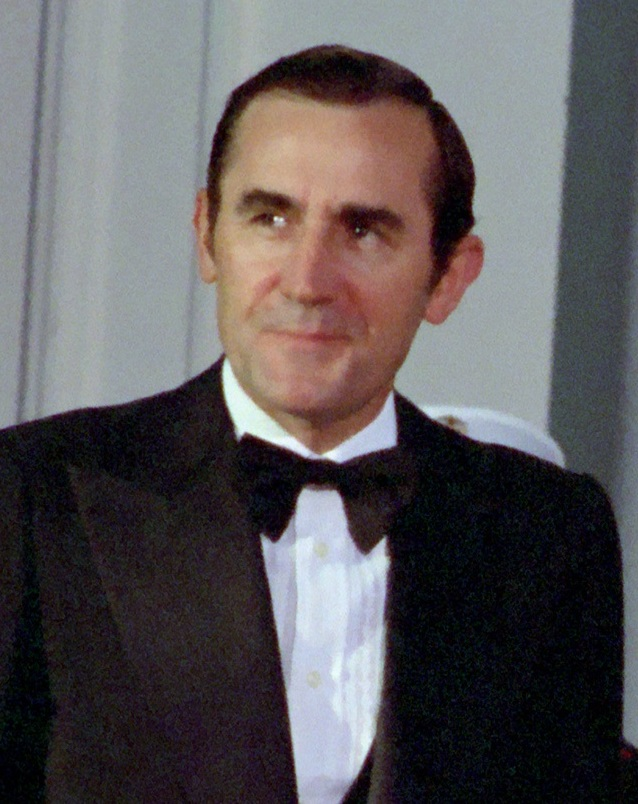
António Ramalho Eanes, 1983

- Amatus Lusitanus (1511–1568), a Jewish physician, an early discoverer of the circulation of the blood.
- Francisco Caldeira Castelo Branco (1566–1619), a Captain-major, founded Belém, capital of Pará in Brazil in 1616.
- Elijah Montalto (1567-1616), Jewish physician at the French royal court, author of works on vision and brain diseases.
- Manuel Dias the Younger (1574–1659), a Jesuit missionary to China, where he introduced the telescope.
- José Ramos Preto (1871–1949), a Portuguese jurist and politician, held high office in 1920.
- José Hipólito Raposo (1885–1953), politician, writer, lawyer and historian; co-founded the political party Integralismo Lusitano.
- Dr. José Lopes Dias (1900-1976), physician, writer, historian, and philanthropist, founder of ESALD and Jardim de Infâcia Alfredo da Mota.
- Eugénia Lima, (Wiki PT) (1926—2014), a famous Portuguese accordionist.
- António Baltasar Marcelino (1930–2013), Bishop of the Roman Catholic Diocese of Aveiro.
- Maria Adelaide Aboim Inglez (1932–2008), a Portuguese Communist Party activist who opposed the Estado Novo regime.
- António Ramalho Eanes (born in Alcains, 1935), general and politician, 16th President of Portugal, 1976-1986.
- Norton (band), formed in 2002: indie, pop, alternative rock band.

=== Athletes ===
- Nuno Rolão (born 1976), a footballer with 459 club caps
- Ana Hormigo (born 1981), an extra-lightweight judoka, competed at the 2008 Summer Olympics
- Dani Matos (born 1983), a footballer with over 300 club caps
- João Afonso (born 1990), a footballer with over 320 club caps

== See also ==
- List of Catholic dioceses in Portugal

== Sources and external links ==
- Municipality official website
- GCatholic - bishopric
- Photos from Castelo Branco
- The Barrocal Park (Granite Massif, aged 310 ± 1 million years)
- Statistical Information about the Municipality
- Instituto Politécnico de Castelo Branco
- Hospital Amato Lusitano
