= Alcains =

- Civil parish
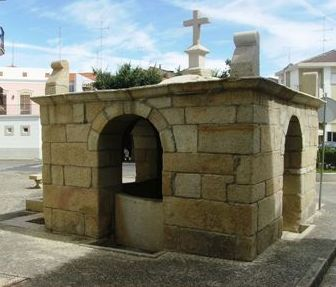
- The Roman-era fountain in the heart of the parish of Alcains

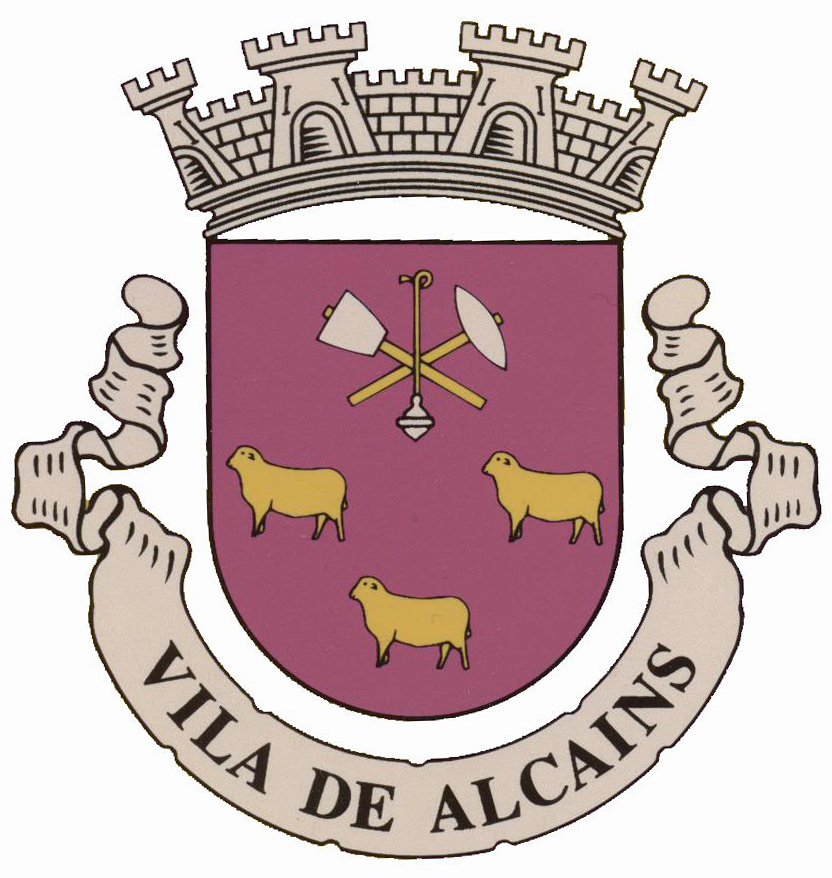
- Coat of arms

- Location in Portugal
- Coordinates: 39.916°N 7.456°W
- Country: Portugal
- Region: Centro
- Intermunic. comm.: Beira Baixa
- District: Castelo Branco
- Municipality: Castelo Branco

Area
  - Total: 36.94 km^{2} (14.26 sq mi)
- Elevation: 370 m (1,210 ft)

Population (2021)
  - Total: 4,615
  - Density: 124.9/km^{2} (323.6/sq mi)
- Time zone: UTC+00:00 (WET)
  - Summer (DST): UTC+01:00 (WEST)
- Postal code: 6005
- Patron: Nossa Senhora da Conceição
- Website: www.jfalcains.pt

Alcains is a civil parish in the municipality of Castelo Branco in Portugal. The population in 2021 was 4,615, in an area of 36.94 km^{2} (14.26 sq mi). Alcains is located within the urban agglomeration of Castelo Branco - Covilhã - Guarda, situated 12 km to the north of Castelo Branco, 230 km to the northeast of Lisbon and 280 km southeast from Porto, while 70 km to the west of the Portuguese-Spanish border and 380 km from Madrid). It is served by the A23 motorway highway, by the EN18 and EN352 national roadways, and also a rail-line from Linha da Beira Baixa (Portuguese: Linha da Beira Baixa).

== History ==
Remote history, indicated by diverse archaeological testaments, indicate a human presence in the area extending back to the pre-historic. During the Neolithic period there were implements discovered in the sites such as the Grulha and Lameira de Curia (today housed in the Museum Tavares Proença Júnior).

The Romanization of the area was also documented in the number of vestiges found in Cabeço da Pelada, such as a kiln and altar dedicated to the divinity Reve, from the 2nd century B.C. Remnants from two altars dedicated to an obscure Lusitanian sun goddess, Asidia were identified in 2008, during excavations in the Chapel of São Domingos, that also identify the Roman influence on the parish's history.

The toponymy Alcains is derived from the Arabic word for church and, according to some historians, may have had the same origin as Alcañiz, a city in the Spanish province of Teruel. In the 12th century the region belonged to the numerous villages and lands that comprised the Herdade de Açafa, dominion of Afonso Henriques. Much later, Afonso III donated these lands to the Knights Templar. Throughout the Middle Ages, its development was somewhat irregular, due to the constant demographic recessions of the region. By the end of the 14th century, the creation of the municipalities led to the survey and delimitation of the parish of Alcains.

Rich in historical and religious patrimony, the region was used by the nobility for summer homes and estates; the Viscounts of Oleiros (whom owned the Solares de Alcains) and the Viscounts of Idanha-a-Nova (who owned the Solares dos Goulões) were beneficial in developing the land in this region, and providing job opportunities. Several stories, legends and anecdotes surfaced during this period, identifying the daily humour and mythos of the community. By the early 16th century, Alcains began to recover economically, by taking advantage of its good geographic situation, through the creation of several workshops, and it later progressed due to the predominance of agricultural activities linked to creation major industries.

Owing to its urban growth, it was elevated to the category of vila (English: town) in 1971 by the decree No.495/71. Until the early 1990s, it was the most important industrial cluster in the municipality.

== Geography ==
Located 370 metres above sea level, the parish of Alcains is crossed by the Ribeira da Líria, an affluent of the Ocreza River, while the Tagus River runs 30 km south of Alcains (its affluents Ponsul and Ocreza rivers run 20 km southeast and 6 km west, respectively). Further to the west, the Zêzere River is located 50 km to the West.

In a radius of 15 to 30 km, the town is surrounded by the Gardunha mountain range (in the north) and by the Alvelos and Moradal mountain ranges (west to south), while the Serra da Estrela (the highest mountain range in Portugal), is located 50 km to the north of Alcains. Other mountain ranges, such as Serra da Lousã, Serra do Açor and Serra de São Mamede are also visible from Alcains. The Sierra de Gata is also located along the Portuguese–Spanish border and can also be seen in the horizon.

Oak and olive trees predominate the landscape of the parish.

=== Climate ===
Alcains has a Temperate Mediterranean climate that includes: summers that have scarce precipitation, with relatively high temperatures (maximum temperatures above 30 °C on many days, with minimums temperatures near 20 °C); winters are cold and rainy, with minimum temperatures as low as −3 °C (while the maximum temperatures are usually around 12 °C). Although winter snowfall is rare, the last event occurred between 10–11 January 2010.

== Economy ==
Until the mid-20th century, the economy of Alcains experienced a boom of economic growth; its economic growth has under-performed national growth rates. Alcains was the main industrial centre within the municipality of Castelo Branco, achieving a period of success during the 1960s and 1970s, through the creation and development of several nationally-recognized companies (such as Dielmar, Fábricas Lusitana and Sicel). Other industries in the region include marble and granite masons, butchers and meat-packers, artisans and, at one time, hat producers.

Alcains owes much of its fame to the granite quarries located here, whose stone is considered to be among the best in Portugal. The work of the stonemasons of Alcains is present in many places in Portugal. The Companhia de Caminhos de Ferro de Portugal (Portuguese Railway Company) applied Alcains stone in many of its stations. The distinct quality of the Alcains stonemasonry is evident in Castelo Branco, with many of the sculptures and statues that embellish the Paço garden utilizing the granite from the region. In addition to the local branch of the Banco de Portugal, granite-work has been exported to the municipality of Covilhã, as well as Viseu, Guarda, Coimbra, Porto, Lisbon, Estremoz, Elvas and Évora. There were also examples of their work in Macao and Maputo.

Alcains is best known for its agricultural pasturelands, and the dairy industry, is reflected in the famous Alcains Cheese, which is processed within the parish.

=== Fairs and markets ===
- Feira dos Santos (Saints' Fair) – an ancient fair that takes place every November 1 in the town's streets. Dry fruits and the main product of the fair, which is one of the most important of the region.
- Feira do Queijo de Alcains (Alcains Cheese Fair) – It takes place every year, on the weekend before Easter.
- Mercado Semanal (Weekly Market) - on Saturdays, in Rua do Arrabalde.

== Architecture ==
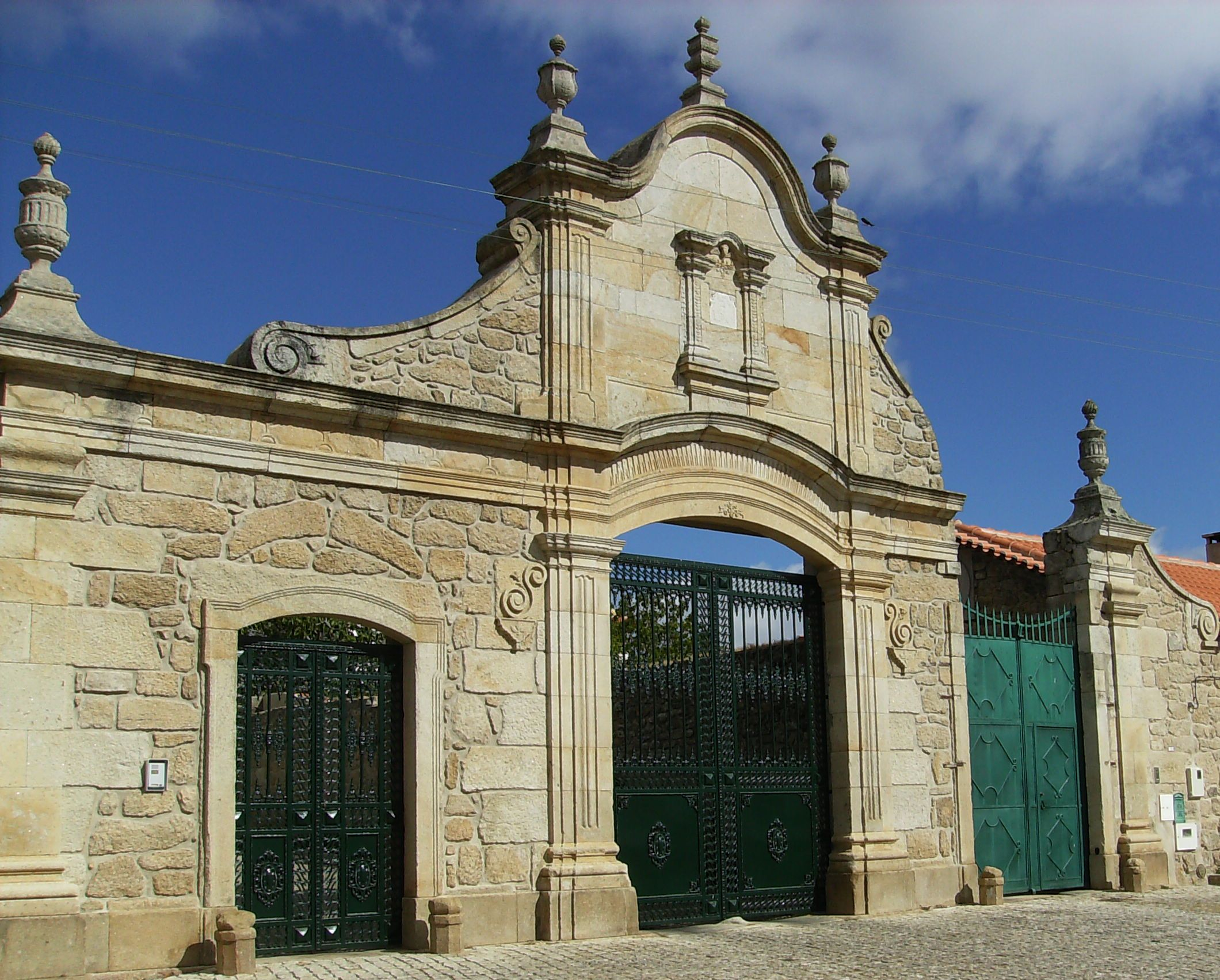
The monumental gates of the Solar de Alcains constructed during the era of the Viscounts of Oleiros and Idanha-a-Nova

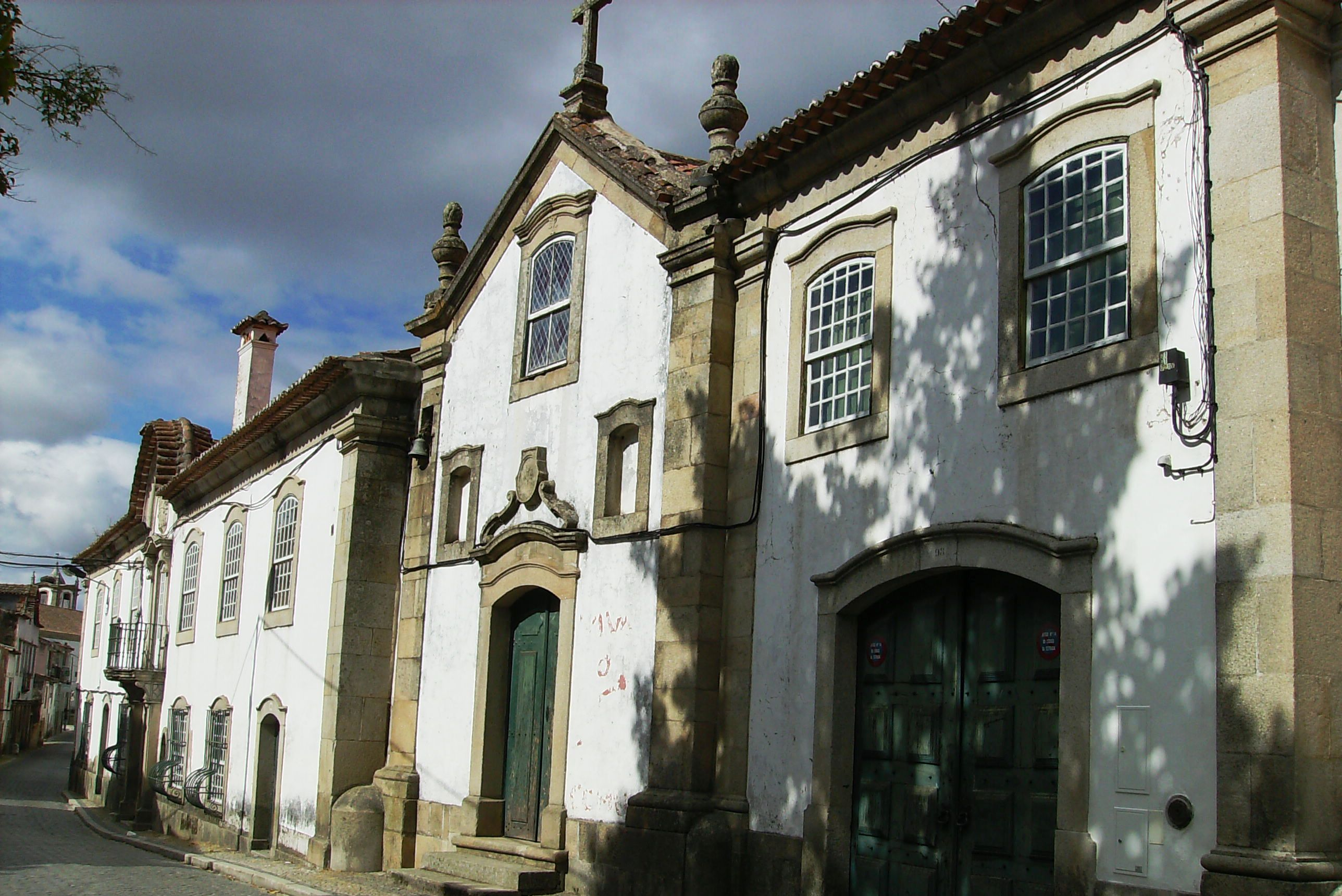
The Chapel (Santa Bárbara) annexed to the Solar of the Viscountess of Oleiros

=== Civic ===
- Chafariz de Santo António (English: Fountain of Saint Anthony) - located in the Largo of Santo António, the fountain has occupied this space since 1928;
- Estátua do Canteiro (English: Statue of the Mason) - situated along the Avenida 12 de Novembro, the statue was inaugurated on 7 September 1985 to pay homage to the stonemasons that built the parish economy;
- Fonte Maria Rodrigues (English: Fountain of Maria Rodrigues) - dating to 1632, it is located east of the Chapel of Santa Apolónia;
- Fonte Romana (English: Roman Fountain) - as much as this fountain resembles a Roman fountain, it was not constructed during this period; this enclosed fountain was constructed in the 17th century;
- Solar da Viscondessa de Oleiros (English: Estate of the Viscountess of Oleiros), also known as the Casa de Alcains (English: House of Alcains) - constructed at the beginning of the 18th century, it is symbolized by the monumental gates of the historical estate;
- Solar dos Goulões (English: Estate of the Goulões) - today the Cultural Centre of Alcains and Instituição de Beneficência (since 1968), but in the 18th century it was home of the Goulões family;
- Tanque das Freiras (English: Nun's Tanque) - situated on the EN18 north of the Chapel of São Domingos, the chapel is known for the coat-of-arms of Sancho II that is carved into temple facade;

=== Religious ===
- Chapel of the Espírito Santo (English: Divine Holy Spirit) - located two kilometres from the centre of town in the Largo do Espírito Santo, this temple dates to 1689 when it was reconstructed;
- Chapel of Nossa Senhora da Piedade (English: Our Lady of Piety), also known as the Chapel of Nossa Senhor das Chagas (English: Our Lady of the Stigmata) or São Brás (Portuguese: Saint Blais) - annexed to the Solar dos Goulões, the first mass was celebrated in 1733;
- Chapel of Santa Bárbara (English: Saint Barbara) - dates back to the 18th century, annexed to the Solar da Viscondessa de Oleiros;
- Chapel of Senhor Jesus do Lírio (English: Sr. Jesus of the Lily) - a chapel situated alongside the cemetery dating to 1927;
- Chapel of the Seminário de São José (English: Seminary of Saint Joseph) - a granite chapel constructed in 1937;
- Chapel of Santa Apolónia (English: Saint Apollonia) - constructed in the 17th century (1639) but repaired in 1965;
- Chapel of São Pedro (English: Saint Peter) - situated in the direction of Escalos de Cima, and completed in the first quarter of the 17th century alongside a Christian pillory;
- Chapel of São Domingos (English: Saint Dominic) - located in the western part of the village, alongside the A23 motorway, the chapel was constructed in the 17th century;
- Matriz Church of Nossa Senhora da Conceição (English: Our Lady of Conception) - the single-nave 16th-century church located on the Rua da Liberidade is composed of a front façade with two bell-towers (a triangular apex and niche with an image of Virgin Mary) and an interior that includes rectangular stained-glass, azulejos that circle the nave and rectangular pulpit, as well as sculpted friezes and cornices in wood. In 1590, the local population requested the authorization to establish a tax in order to refurbish the interior furniture. But, in 1642, while the church was being remodelled and reconstructed, the congregation operated from the Chapel of the Espírito Santo; similar remodelling projects were undertaken in 1722 and then in 1754, master João Domingos do Vale was contracted to refurbish the stones.
- Monumento à Virgem Maria (English: Monument to the Virgin Mary) - erected in June 1953, this column of granite was carved by stonemasons by José André Júnior;

== Education ==
The town has a nursery school, two kindergartens (J/I de Feiteira and JI de Pedreira), a primary school (Escola Basica de Alcains, which includes two buildings, 50 meters apart) and a combination middle and secondary school (EB 2-3/S José Sanches) equipped with a gym. Originally, the main primary school was located in Feiteira (now a kindergarten), which was inaugurated in 1942, but the building was remodelled and primary activities transferred to the current 19th century-era building. The space was remodelled and expanded to accommodate the students, which at one time served as the local courts/house-of-justice. Until the 1990s, there was a religious-denomination school in the Seminario de São José, which was, at one time, the High Seminary of the Portalegre-Castelo Branco bishopric.

== Entertainment and sports ==
=== Associations ===
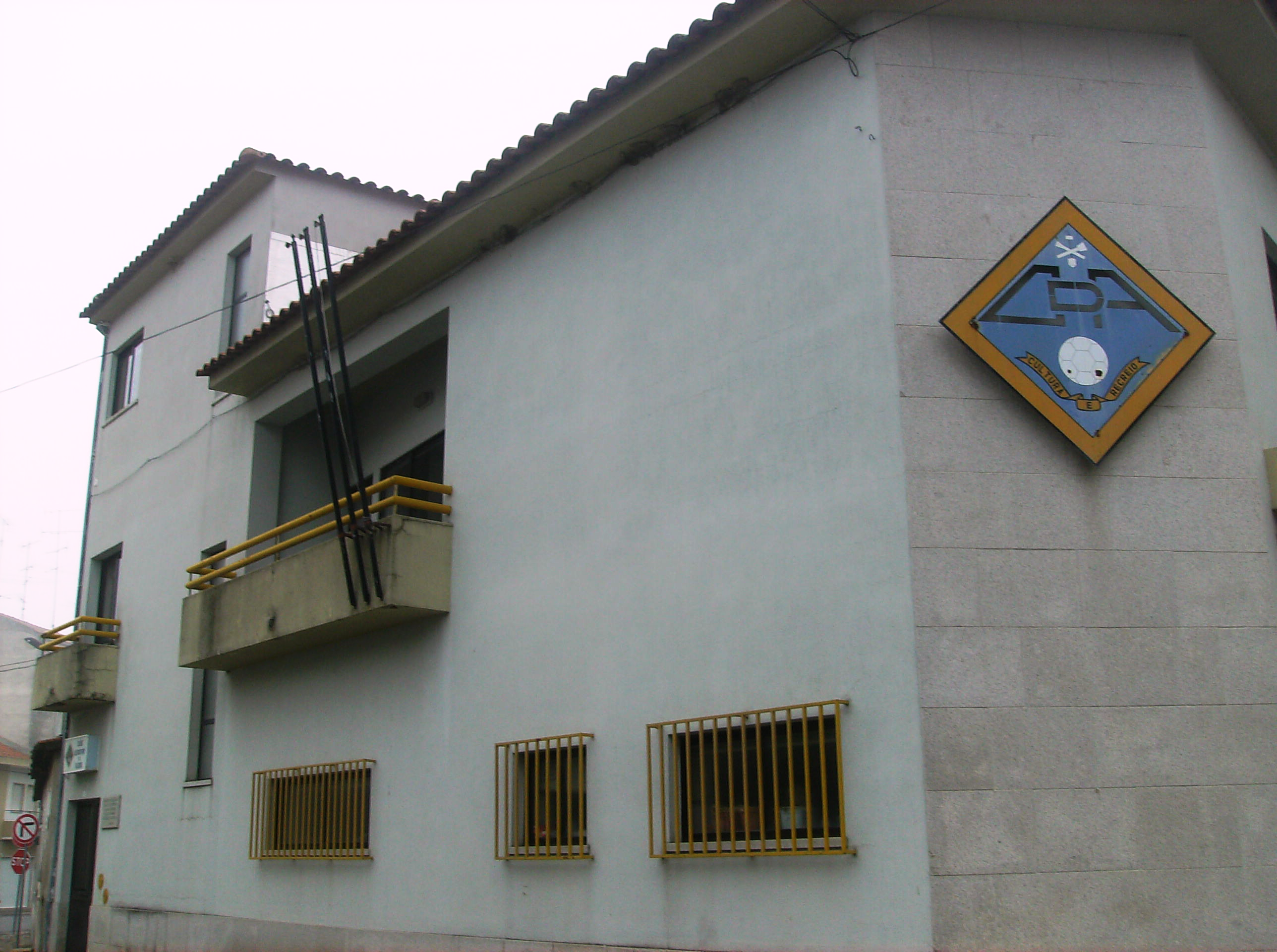
The headquarters of Clube Desportivo de Alcains

- Clube Desportivo de Alcains
- Alcaténis
- Clube Recreativo Alcainense
- Casa do Benfica de Alcains
- Associação Caça e Pesca de Alcains
- Associação Papa-Léguas
- Associação de Dadores de Sangue da Beira Interior Sul
- Associação Recreativa e Cultural de Alcains (ARCA)
- Alzine

=== Festivals and events ===
- Festa das Papas – in the last weekend of August, the Papas de Carolo are cooked in the streets of Alcains. This event brings numerous visitors to enjoy the sweet Papas for free.
- Romaria de Santa Apolónia – It takes place in the 5th weekend after Easter and it brings a crowd of people to the Santa Apolónia grounds. It is a romaria that combines the religious with the popular. It is organized by a group of locals, there is a procession that leaves from Alcains Church heading to the Santa Apolónia Chapel. Many townspeople carry offerings in wooden trays to be given to the Saint. Lunch usually takes place in the park annexed to the grounds. Tradition says that, before the mass that ends the celebrations, the townspeople must give 3 laps around the Chapel.
- Festins – A festival targeted for the young people that takes place in July or August, organized by the local association Alzine. It lasts for 3 to 4 days combining dance, cinema, theater, yoga, lectures and even donkey rides.
- Festas de "nomes próprios " – they are essentially gathering that annually gather people (essentially men) with the same name. For example: "Festa dos Joões", "Festa dos Josés", "Festa dos Manuéis", "Festa dos Antónios", etc.
- Jantares da Malta – every year, on the night of October 31 there are the Malta dinners, in which each person from Alcains gets together with those who were born on the same year. The different years have a dinner on the town's restaurants and then gather at the end of the dinner of the center of the town, where the party can last all night.
- Semana do Agrupamento – for five days, and to mark the end of each school year, the Schools of Alcains have a festival that include cultural activities, sports, traditional games, a crafts fair. In 2009 the Schools decided to recreate the Santo António celebration, that had not taken place since 1977.

=== Gastronomy ===
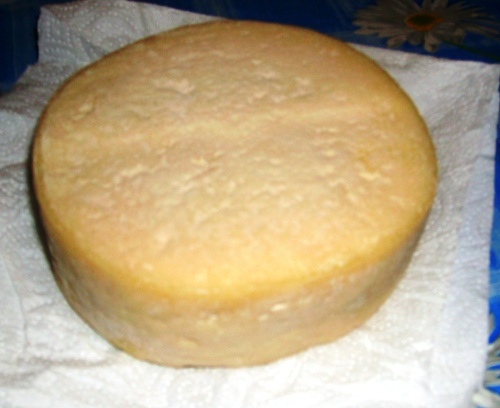
Alcains cheese

- Alcains cheese
- Sopa antiga de Alcains (old soup of Alcains)
- Cabrito recheado (stuffed goat)
- Papas de carolo
- Bolo de festa/Páscoa (Easter cake)
- Biscoitos de azeite (olive oil biscuits)
- Broas de mel (honey cakes)

== Notable citizens ==
- António Ramalho Eanes, (born 1935), a Portuguese general and politician, the 16th President of Portugal in 1976–1986
