= Dani Matos =

Portuguese footballer

Personal information
- Full name: Daniel Mendes de Matos
- Place of birth: Alcains, Portugal
- Height: 1.73 m (5 ft 8 in)
- Position: Midfielder

Team information
- Current team: Sporting de Covilhã (head coach)

Youth career
- 1994–1997: Alcains
- 1997–1998: Benfica e Castelo Branco
- 1998–2000: Alcains
- 2000–2002: Benfica

Senior career*
Years	Team	Apps	(Gls)
2002–2004	Alcains		
2004–2006	Benfica e Castelo Branco	57	(8)
2006–2012	Sporting de Covilhã	112	(12)
2012–2019	Benfica e Castelo Branco	189	(44)
2019–2021	Alcains	20	(1)

Managerial career
- 2021–2022: Alcains
- 2023–2026: Benfica e Castelo Branco
- 2026–: Sporting de Covilhã
- * Club domestic league appearances and goals

Daniel Mendes de Matos, known as Dani Matos (born 15 May 1983) is a Portuguese football coach and former player who is the head coach of Liga 3 club Sporting da Covilhã. As a player, Matos was a midfielder.

== Career ==
Dani Matos made his professional debut in the Segunda Liga for Sporting Covilhã on 24 August 2008 in a game against Desportivo das Aves.
