= Nuno Rolão =

Portuguese footballer (born 1976)

Personal information
- Full name: Nuno Filipe Sousa Rolão Dias Santos
- Date of birth: 24 September 1976 (age 50)
- Place of birth: Castelo Branco, Portugal
- Height: 1.83 m (6 ft 0 in)
- Position: Centre back

Youth career
- 1989–1990: Benfica Castelo Branco
- 1990–1991: Alcains
- 1991–1992: Benfica Castelo Branco
- 1992–1995: Benfica

Senior career*
Years	Team	Apps	(Gls)
1995–1996	Benfica Castelo Branco	30	(3)
1996–1998	Beneditense	51	(9)
1998–1999	Leixões	22	(3)
1999–2000	Naval	11	(0)
2000–2002	Imortal	45	(2)
2002–2003	Barreirense	37	(5)
2003–2005	Espinho	57	(3)
2005–2006	Pinhalnovense	27	(3)
2006–2013	Atlético	179	(16)
Total		459	(44)
- * Club domestic league appearances and goals

Nuno Filipe Sousa Rolão Dias Santos (born 24 September 1976 in Castelo Branco) is a Portuguese retired professional footballer who played as a central defender.
