= Giambattista Canano =

Italian anatomist and professor

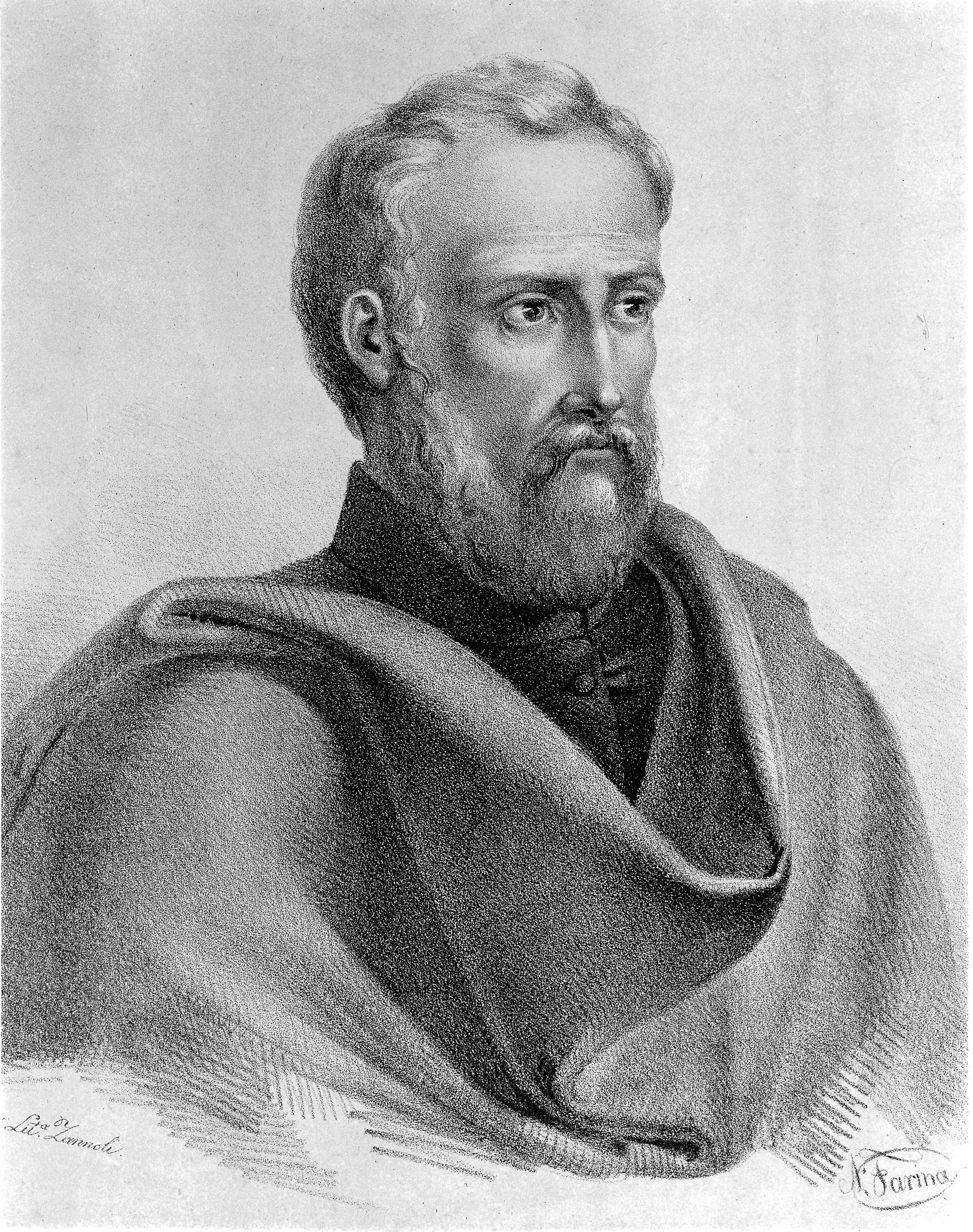

Giambattista or Giovanni Battista Canano (1515 – 29 January 1579) was a physician and anatomist, active mainly in his native Ferrara.

His aristocratic family, of Greek ancestry, produced a number of physicians and scholars. His father, Ludovico Canano, was a notary. His grandfather was lecturer in medicine at Ferrara and physician at court. The family came to Italy from Greece in the 15th century.

Canano's studies were most likely directed by his uncle Hippolito. He became professor of anatomy at the University of Ferrara in 1541. He was physician to Francesco d'Este in France in 1544, and personal physician to Physician to Pope Julius III from 1552 to 1555.

He pursued most of his dissections at his own home, with his cousin Antonio Maria Canano. These surgeries were attended by leading physicians of the city.

Canano was a colleague of Andreas Vesalius and Vesalius attributes to Canano the first observation of valves of veins, a crucial discovery that would lead to the understanding of the circulatory system.

He published one volume of his own writings on anatomy, Musculorum humani corporis picturata dissectio, illustrated by Gerolamo da Carpi. It contained 20 pages with 27 illustrations. He never completed the later volumes. He may have been discouraged by the great success of Vesalius' De humani corporis fabrica, which covered the same subjects Canano was working on. However Canano's book was highly original, containing the first anatomical drawings of the lumbricals and interossei of the hand, and the first description and drawing of the palmaris brevis muscle and the oblique head of the adductor pollicis muscle, which was not observed by Vesalius and was unknown to Galen. Canano was the first to discover the palmaris brevis.

He died in Ferrara.
