= Broa de mel =

Portuguese dessert

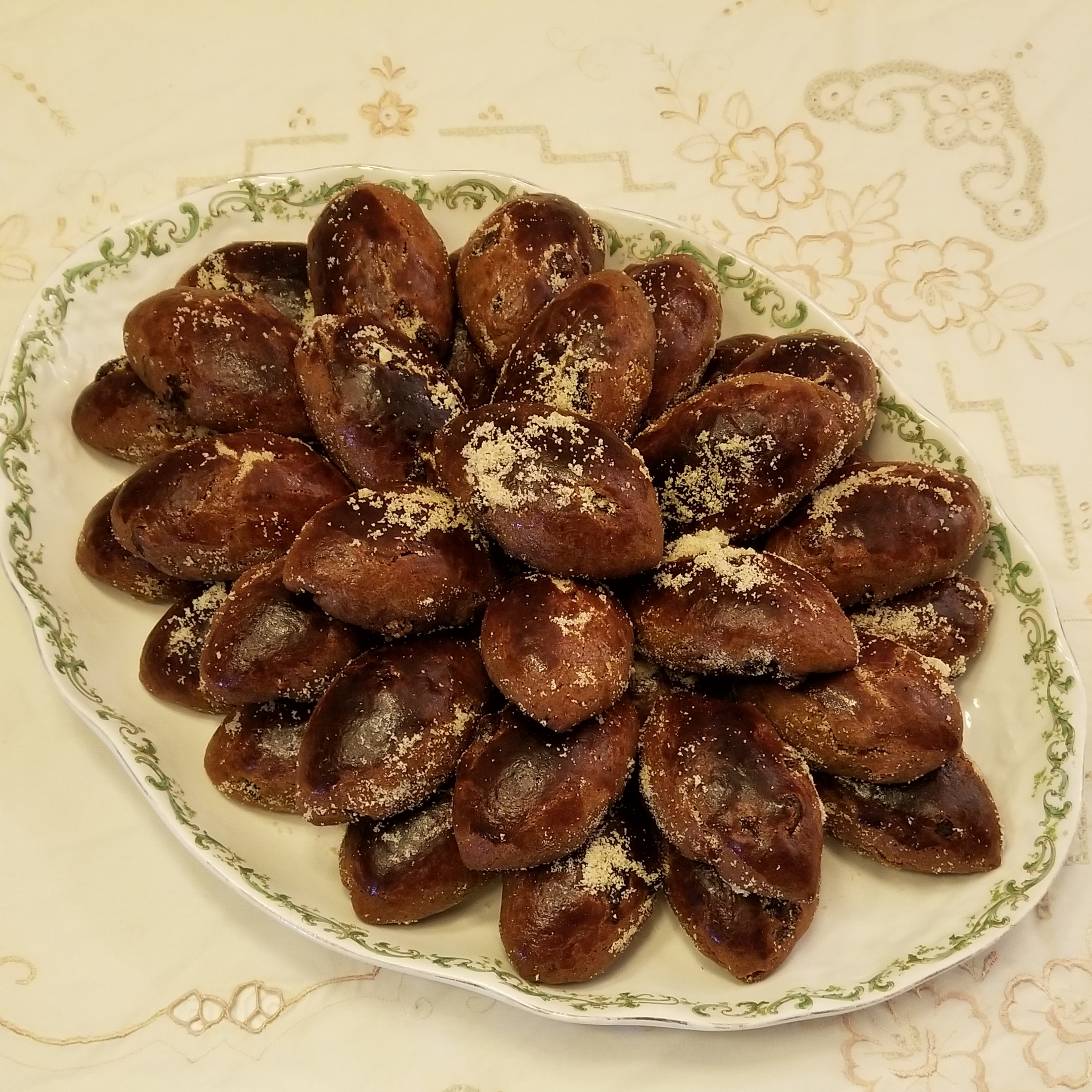
- Type: Cake
- Place of origin: Portugal

Broa de mel is a sugarcane-honey-flavored Portuguese biscuit made with rich ingredients and spices that may include "wheat flour, eggs, honey and/or sugar, olive oil, pine nuts, sweet wine or coffee, salt and spices (cinnamon, cloves and fennel)." Some sources permit the substitution of anise for fennel. Broas de mel are traditionally consumed at Christmas time (Natal), and in some regions on All Saints' Day (Dia de Todos os Santos).

== History ==
The giving and receiving of broas de mel traditionally carries a double meaning with the use of two expressions. The first, receber as broas (roughly, "to receive the broas") represents the receiving of a gift, usually money. And the second, que ricas broas (roughly, "what rich/abundant broas"), contains an irony; for if one has had any problems that require the spending of money, the holidays only become poorer as a result. Another source states that the giving and receiving of broas represents the offering and receiving of good memories, remembrances or wishes.
