= 2010–11 Taça de Portugal =

Taça de Portugal Millennium

Tournament details
- Country: Portugal
- Teams: 172

Final positions
- Champions: Porto
- Runners-up: Vitória de Guimarães

Tournament statistics
- Matches played: 170
- Goals scored: 470 (2.76 per match)
- Top goal scorer(s): Edgar; Óscar Cardozo (5 goals)

The 2010–11 Taça de Portugal, also known as Taça de Portugal Millennium for sponsorship reasons, was the 71st season of the Taça de Portugal. A total of 172 clubs from all four tiers of Portuguese football took part in this tournament. In the final (played at the Estádio Nacional, in Oeiras), Porto beat Vitória de Guimarães by 6–2, in a reedition of the 1988 final.

== Participating teams ==
The following teams took part in this competition:

Liga Zon Sagres (16 teams, 2 in competition)

- Académica de Coimbra
- Beira-Mar
- Benfica
- Braga
- Marítimo
- Nacional
- Naval
- Olhanense
- Paços de Ferreira
- Portimonense
- Porto
- Rio Ave
- Sporting CP
- União de Leiria
- Vitória de Guimarães
- Vitória de Setúbal

Liga Orangina (16 teams)

- Arouca
- Belenenses
- Desportivo das Aves
- Estoril Praia
- Fátima
- Feirense
- Freamunde
- Gil Vicente
- Leixões
- Moreirense
- Oliveirense
- Penafiel
- Santa Clara
- Sporting Covilhã
- Trofense
- Varzim

Second Division (46 teams^{[1]}^{[2]})

- Aliados Lordelo
- Anadia
- Andorinha
- Atlético
- Atlético Reguengos
- Bragança
- Camacha
- Caniçal
- Casa Pia
- Carregado
- Cesarense
- Chaves
- Coimbrões
- Eléctrico
- Esmoriz
- Fafe
- Farense
- Gondomar
- Juventude de Évora
- Lagoa
- Louletano
- Lousada
- Macedo de Cavaleiros
- Madalena
- Mafra
- Merelinense
- Oliveirense
- Operário
- Oriental
- Padroense
- Pampilhosa
- Pinhalnovense
- Pontassolense
- Praiense
- Real
- Ribeirão
- Sertanense
- Sporting de Espinho
- Sporting de Pombal
- Tirsense
- Tondela
- Torreense
- Tourizense
- União da Madeira
- União da Serra
- Vizela

Terceira Divisão (94 teams)

- 1º de Maio
- 1º de Dezembro
- Académico de Viseu
- Agrense
- Aguiar da Beira
- Águias do Moradal
- Alba
- Alcochetense
- Aljustrelense
- Alpendorada
- Amarante
- Amares
- Atlético da Malveira
- Atlético do Tojal
- Avanca
- Beira-Mar Monte Gordo
- Benfica e Castelo Branco
- Boavista de São Mateus
- Bom Sucesso
- Bombarralense
- Bustelo
- Caçadores das Taipas
- Caldas
- Câmara de Lobos
- Candal
- Capelense
- Cinfães
- Cova da Piedade
- Crato
- Cruzado Canicense
- Esperança de Lagos
- Esposende
- Estrela da Calheta
- Estrela de Vendas Novas
- Fabril Barreiro
- Famalicão
- Fão
- Fiães
- Gândara
- Joane
- Juventude Gaula
- Leça
- Limianos
- Lusitânia dos Açores
- Lusitânia Lourosa
- Machico
- Maria da Fonte
- Marinhense
- Melgacense
- Messinense
- Mirandela
- Mondinense
- Monsanto
- Moura
- Nogueirense
- Odemirense
- Odivelas
- Oeiras
- Oliveira de Frades
- Oliveira do Bairro
- Oliveira do Douro
- Paredes
- Penalva do Castelo
- Peniche
- Pescadores da Caparica
- Portosantense
- Prainha
- Rebordosa
- Riachense
- Ribeira Brava
- S. João de Ver
- Sacavenense
- Sampedrense
- Santacruzense
- Santa Maria
- Santana
- Santiago
- Serzedelo
- Sesimbra
- Sintrense
- Sourense
- Sousense
- Sporting Ideal
- Tocha
- União Micaelense
- União de Montemor
- Valenciano
- Vianense
- Vieira
- Vigor Mocidade
- Vila Meã
- Vilanovense
- Vitória do Pico
- Xavelhas

== First round ==
In this round entered teams from the Segunda Divisão (3rd level) and the Terceira Divisão (4th level). Twenty teams received a bye to the Second Round: 1º de Maio (III), Alcochetense (III), Aliados Lordelo (II), Amarante (III), Atlético da Malveira (III), Camacha (II), Coimbrões (II), Esposende (III), Limianos (III), Maria da Fonte (III), Mondinense (III), Monsanto (III), Moura (III), Paredes (III), Penalva do Castelo (III), Pontassolense (II), Praiense (II), Sousense (III), Tirsense (II) and Tondela (II). The matches were played on September 4 and 5, 2010.

Home team	Score	Away team
Vitória do Pico (III)	2–3	Bragança (II)
Portosantense (III)	2–1	Casa Pia (II)
Avanca (III)	0–5	Messinense (III)
Vianense (III)	2–0	Prainha (III)
Bom Sucesso (III)	1–2	Santacruzense (III)
Bombarralense (III)	2–1	Sporting Ideal (III)
Estrela da Calheta (III)	1–2	Lagoa (II)
Madalena (II)	3–0	Pescadores da Caparica (III)
Sertanense (II)	2–0	Machico (III)
Juventude de Évora (II)	3–0	Valenciano (III)
Atlético de Reguengos (II)	0–1	Tourizense (II)
Gondomar (II)	1–1 (aet, p. 4–3)	Caniçal (II)
Caldas (III)	2–1	Oliveira do Bairro (III)
Vizela (II)	0–0 (aet, p. 4–5)	Ribeirão (II)
Crato (III)	0–1	Académico de Viseu (III)
Operário (II)	3–2	Sporting de Pombal (II)
Santiago (III)	0–2	S. João de Ver (III)
Oriental (II)	4–0	Odemirense (III)
Vigor Mocidade (III)	0–0 (aet, p. 3–4)	Ribeira Brava (III)
Sacavenense (III)	2–0	Alba (III)
Merelinense (II)	4–2	Rebordosa (III)
Xavelhas (III)	0–6	Vieira (III)
Estrela de Vendas Novas (III)	4–2	Agrense (III)
Sporting de Espinho (II)	1–0 (aet)	Sesimbra (III)
Pinhalnovense (II)	5–0	União Micaelense (III)
Lusitânia Lourosa (III)	0–2	Vila Meã (III)
Tocha (III)	0–1	Torreense (II)
Macedo de Cavaleiros (II)	3–1	Benfica e Castelo Branco (III)
Oeiras (III)	1–0 (aet)	Real (II)
Sourense (III)	1–0	Câmara de Lobos (III)

Home team	Score	Away team
União de Montemor (III)	2–1	Leça (III)
Carregado (II)	3–1	Eléctrico (II)
Louletano (II)	5–0	Andorinha (II)
Santa Maria (III)	2–0	Caçadores das Taipas (III)
Aguiar da Beira (III)	0–2	Melgacense (III)
Anadia (II)	2–0	AD Oliveirense (II)
Oliveira do Douro (III)	1–2	Sampedrense (III)
Cova da Piedade (III)	3–0 (aet)	Esmoriz (II)
União da Madeira (II)	6–0	Nogueirense (III)
Serzedelo (III)	0–0 (aet, p. 6–5)	Famalicão (III)
Atlético do Tojal (III)	0–8	Mafra (II)
Chaves (II)	2–2 (aet, p. 3–4)	Amares (III)
Lusitânia dos Açores (III)	1–2 (aet)	Padroense (II)
Mirandela (III)	3–0	Fão (III)
Joane (III)	1–3 (aet)	Bustelo (III)
Lousada (II)	1–0	Peniche (III)
União da Serra (II)	3–0	Juventude Gaula (III)
Cesarense (II)	1–0 (aet)	Riachense (III)
Odivelas (III)	1–0	Pampilhosa (II)
Capelense (III)	0–1	Oliveira de Frades (III)
Cruzado Canicense (III)	2–2 (aet, p. 3–5)	Atlético (II)
Gândara (III)	0–3	Fiães (III)
Vilanovense (III)	0–2	Cinfães (III)
Candal (III)	3–1	Águias do Moradal (III)
Beira-Mar Monte Gordo (III)	1–8	Fafe (II)
Marinhense (III)	0–1	Esperança de Lagos (III)
1º de Dezembro (III)	1–0	Fabril Barreiro (III)
Aljustrelense (III)	1–1 (aet, p. 2–3)	Boavista de São Mateus (III)
Sintrense (III)	0–1	Alpendorada (III)
Farense (II)	3–0	Santana (III)

== Second round ==
In this round entered teams from Liga Orangina (2nd level) and the winners from the first round. The matches were played on September 18 and 19, 2010.

Home team	Score	Away team
Messinense (III)	1–2	Cesarense (II)
Bragança (II)	1–2	Estrela de Vendas Novas (III)
Torreense (II)	2–0	Madalena (II)
Gil Vicente (LH)	2–0	Caldas (III)
Leixões (LH)	4–2	Vila Meã (III)
União da Serra (II)	1–1 (aet, p. 4–5)	Farense (II)
Sampedrense (III)	1–1 (aet, p. 5–4)	Vieira (III)
Feirense (LH)	3–1	Sacavense (III)
S. João de Ver (III)	1–0	Candal (III)
Santa Maria (III)	2–2 (aet, p. 4–2)	Sourense (III)
Lagoa (II)	1–0	Tondela (II)
União de Montemor (III)	1–2 (aet)	Sporting de Espinho (II)
Amares (III)	1–0	Macedo de Cavaleiros (II)
Fafe (II)	2–0	Melgacense (III)
Odivelas (III)	0–1	Cinfães (III)
Belenenses (LH)	1–0 (aet)	Lousada (II)
Padroense (II)	2–1 (aet)	Sousense (III)
Esposende (III)	0–2	Arouca (LH)
Coimbrões (II)	3–2	Oliveirense (LH)
Tirsense (II)	2–0	Praiense (II)
Sertanense (II)	2–2 (aet, p. 4–2)	Serzedelo (III)
Ribeirão (II)	1–0	Amarante (III)
Tourizense (II)	1–0	Freamunde (LH)
Vianense (III)	0–2	Limianos (III)

Home team	Score	Away team
Anadia (II)	3–2	Esperança de Lagos (III)
Mirandela (III)	2–1	Moura (III)
Mafra (II)	2–2 (aet, p. 8–7)	Alpendorada (III)
Alcochetense (III)	1–4 (aet)	Penalva do Castelo (III)
1º de Dezembro (III)	3–1 (aet)	Camacha (II)
Cova da Piedade (III)	1–2	Gondomar (II)
Mondinense (III)	2–0	Bustelo (III)
Desportivo das Aves (LH)	1–2	Louletano (II)
Boavista de São Mateus (III)	0–0 (aet, p. 1–3)	Pontassolense (II)
Estoril-Praia (LH)	2–0	Sporting da Covilhã (LH)
Fiães (III)	0–2	Varzim (LH)
Moreirense (LH)	3–0	Paredes (III)
Pinhalnovense (II)	2–0	Maria da Fonte (III)
Aliados Lordelo (II)	1–0	Oeiras (III)
Juventude de Évora (II)	1–0	Académico de Viseu (III)
Santacruzense (III)	0–2	Bombarralense (III)
1º de Maio (III)	2–2 (aet, p. 4–5)	Atlético da Malveira (III)
União da Madeira (II)	2–1 (aet)	Trofense (LH)
Fátima (LH)	2–1	Oriental (II)
Ribeira Brava (III)	0–1	Atlético (II)
Merelinense (II)	3–1	Monsanto (III)
Portosantense (III)	0–1	Carregado (II)
Operário (II)	1–0	Penafiel (LH)
Santa Clara (LH)	4–0	Oliveira de Frades (III)

== Third round ==
In this round entered teams from Liga ZON Sagres (1st level) and the winners from the second round. The matches were played on October 10, 16 and 17th and December 23, 2010.

Home team	Score	Away team
1º de Dezembro (III)	1–2	Braga (PL)
União de Leiria (PL)	1–2 (aet)	União da Madeira (II)
Gil Vicente (LH)	1–1 (aet, p. 2–4)	Vitória de Setúbal (PL)
Estoril-Praia (LH)	1–2	Sporting CP (PL)
Rio Ave (PL)	5–1	Estrela de Vendas Novas (III)
Porto (PL)	4–1	Limianos (III)
Benfica (PL)	5–1	Arouca (LH)
Naval (PL)	0–2	Marítimo (PL)
Paços de Ferreira (PL)	3–1	S. João de Ver (III)
Portimonense (PL)	2–0	Cinfães (III)
Cesarense (II)	1–2 (aet)	Académica de Coimbra (PL)
Mirandela (III)	1–1 (aet, p. 2–4)	Beira-Mar (PL)
Pinhalnovense (II)	3–0	Fafe (II)
Ribeirão (II)	2–0	Belenenses (LH)
Merelinense (II)	2–1	Farense (II)
Carregado (II)	0–0 (aet, p. 3–2)	Fátima (LH)

Home team	Score	Away team
Lagoa (II)	0–0 (aet, p. 4–5)	Torreense (II)
Bombarralense (III)	^{1}	Louletano (II)
Tirsense (II)	5–1	Sampedrense (III)
Sporting de Espinho (II)	4–1	Pontassolense (II)
Sertanense (II)	0–0 (aet, p. 1–4)	Olhanense (PL)
Anadia (II)	1–2	Feirense (LH)
Mondinese (III)	2–1 (aet)	Coimbrões (II)
Juventude de Évora (II)	1–0	Santa Clara (LH)
Operário (II)	0–2	Moreirense (LH)
Santa Maria (III)	1–0 (aet)	Penalva do Castelo (III)
Atlético (II)	3–1	Macedo de Cavaleiros (II)
Tourizence (II)	2–1 (aet)	Aliados Lordelo (II)
Vitória de Guimarães (PL)	4–0	Atlético da Malveira (III)
Nacional (PL)	2–1 (aet)	Padroense (II)
Leixões (LH)	3–2	Mafra (II)
Varzim (LH)	0–0 (aet, p. 4–2)	Gondomar (II)

^{1} 0–3 defeat was given to both teams.

== Fourth round ==
The matches were played on November 21, December 12, 2010, and January 5, 2011.

Home team	Score	Away team
Merelinense (II)	2–0	Carregado (II)
Portimonense (PL)	1–2	Vitória de Guimarães (PL)
Varzim (LH)	4–3 (aet)	Ribeirão (II)
Rio Ave (PL)	3–0	Feirense (LH)
Sporting de Espinho (II)	1–2	Leixões (LH)
Moreirense (LH)	0–1	Porto (PL)
Sporting CP (PL)	1–0	Paços de Ferreira (PL)
Atlético (II)	2–2 (aet, p. 6–5)	Tourizence (II)
Pinhalnovense (II)	2–0	Tirsense (II)
Mondinese (III)	1–2 (aet)	Torreense (II)
	^{2}	União da Madeira (II)
Beira-Mar (PL)	0–2	Académica de Coimbra (PL)
Marítimo (PL)	1–2	Vitória de Setúbal (PL)
Benfica (PL)	2–0	Braga (PL)
Olhanense (PL)	1–0	Nacional (PL)
Juventude de Évora (II)	3–0	Santa Maria (III)

^{2} It was scheduled that the winner of the match between Bombarralense and Louletano would play against U. Madeira, but both teams have been eliminated, and so U. Madeira is qualified to next round.

== Fifth round ==
The matches were played on December 11, 12, 2010 and January 12, 2011.

Home team	Score	Away team
Porto (PL)	4–0	Juventude de Évora (II)
Vitória de Setúbal (PL)	2–1	Sporting CP (PL)
Rio Ave (PL)	4–1	Atlético (II)
Leixões (LH)	1–1 (aet, p. 4–5)	Pinhalnovense (II)
Benfica (PL)	5–0	Olhanense (PL)
Académica de Coimbra (PL)	3–1	União da Madeira (II)
Varzim (LH)	1–2	Merelinense (II)
Vitória de Guimarães (PL)	2–0	Torreense (II)

== Quarter-finals ==
The matches were played on 12, 26, 27 and 28 January 2011.

Home team	Score	Away team
Porto (PL)	2–0	Pinhalnovense (II)
Rio Ave (PL)	0–2	Benfica (PL)
Merelinense (II)	0–2	Vitória de Guimarães (PL)
Académica de Coimbra (PL)	3–2	Vitória de Setúbal (PL)

12 January 2011	Porto	2–0	Pinhalnovense	Porto
19:45 UTC+0	Hulk 78', 90+2'			Stadium: Estádio do Dragão

26 January 2011	Rio Ave	0–2	Benfica	Vila do Conde
TBD UTC+0			Cardozo 44' (pen.), 87'	Stadium: Estádio dos Arcos

27 January 2011	Merelinense	0–2	Vitória de Guimarães	Braga
TBD UTC+0			Edgar 30'; Cléber 45'	Stadium: Estádio 1º de Maio; Referee: Rui Costa

28 January 2011	Académica	3–2	Vitória de Setúbal	Coimbra
TBD UTC+0	Éder 40'; Sougou 44'; Bischoff 85'		Brasão 16'; Collin 87'	Stadium: Estádio Cidade de Coimbra

== Semi-finals ==
=== Final phase bracket ===
Teams that are listed first played at home in the first leg.

Semi-finals; 2/3 February 2011; 27 March 2011/20 April 2011
Porto (a)	0	3	3
Benfica	2	1	3
Vitória de Guimarães	1	0	1
Académica de Coimbra	0	0	0

Final; 22 May 2011
Porto	6
Vitória de Guimarães	2

Team 1	Agg.	Team 2	1st leg	2nd leg
Porto	3–3 (a)	Benfica	0–2	3–1
Vitória de Guimarães	1–0	Académica de Coimbra	1–0	0–0

=== First leg ===
2 February 2011
20:30 UTC+0

Porto	0−2	Benfica
		Coentrão 6'; García 26'

Estádio do Dragão, Porto
Attendance: 50,000

3 February 2011
TBD UTC+0

Vitória de Guimarães	1–0	Académica
Faouzi 80'

Estádio D. Afonso Henriques, Guimarães
Attendance: 30,000

=== Second leg ===
20 April 2011
TBD UTC+1

Benfica	1–3	Porto
Cardozo 79' (pen.)		Moutinho 64'; Hulk 72'; Falcao 74'

Estádio da Luz, Lisbon

3–3 on aggregate. Porto won on away goals.

27 March 2011
TBD UTC+1

Académica	0–0	Vitória de Guimarães

Estádio Cidade de Coimbra, Coimbra

Vitória de Guimarães won 1–0 on aggregate.

== Final ==
22 May 2011
17:00 UTC+1

Vitória de Guimarães	2–6	Porto
Pereira 20' (o.g.); Edgar 23'	Report	Rodríguez 2', 45+2', 73'; Varela 21'; Rolando 35'; Hulk 42'

Estádio Nacional, Oeiras
Attendance: 35,000
Referee: João Ferreira (Setúbal)

== Top scorers ==
Rank	Player	Club	Goals
1	(Brazil) Edgar	Vitória de Guimarães	5
1	(Paraguay) Óscar Cardozo	Benfica	5
3	(Brazil) Hulk	Porto	4
3	(Brazil) Walter	Porto	4
3	(Portugal) Yazalde	Rio Ave	4
6	(Portugal) Éder	Académica de Coimbra	3
6	(Colombia) James Rodríguez	Porto	3
6	(Argentina) Javier Saviola	Benfica	3
6	(Colombia) Radamel Falcao	Porto	3

Last updated: 27 January 2013

== Footnotes ==
1. Boavista was suspended for two years for forfeiting a match in the 2009–10 season.
2. Marítimo B team is not allowed to take part in the competition, as rules forbid the participation of "B teams".
