= 2008–09 Taça de Portugal =

Tournament details
- Country: Portugal
- Teams: 173

Final positions
- Champions: Porto (14th title)
- Runners-up: Paços de Ferreira

Tournament statistics
- Top goal scorer(s): Mateus; Pedrinha (3 goals)

2008–09 Taça de Portugal was the 86th season of Portuguese football knockout tournament. The competition started on August 30, 2008 with the first round and ended with the final held in on May 31, 2009. The defending champions were Sporting CP.

== First round ==
In this round entered teams from second (3rd level) and third division (4th level). A number of teams received a bye to the second round: Fátima (III), União da Madeira (III), Abrantes (III), Lagoa (III), Torreense (III), Lusitânia dos Açores (IV), Marinhas (IV), Vila Meã (IV), Madalena (IV), Amares (IV), Mondinense (IV), Portosantense (IV), Fornos de Algodres (IV), Louletano (IV), Coimbrőes (IV), Cinfães (IV), Caldas (IV), Futebol Benfica (IV) and Académico Viseu (IV). The matches were played on August 30, 31, September 4, 6 and 7, 2008.

Home team	Score	Away team
Lixa (IV)	2–1 (aet)	A.D. Oliveirense (IV)
A.C. Cacém (IV)	1–0	Tourizense (III)
Barreirense (IV)	1–3	Operário (III)
Benfica Castelo Branco (IV)	0–2	Elvas (IV)
Esmoriz (III)	3–2	Anadia (IV)
GDPCC (III)	0–1	Mãe d'Água (IV)
Real S.C. (III)	2–0	Macedo de Cavaleiros (IV)
Fabril (IV)	1–1 (aet, p. 3–1)	Pampilhosa (III)
Pontassolense (III)	3–3 (aet, p. 2–4)	Oliveira do Bairro (III)
Vilanovense (IV)	1–2	Serzedelo (IV)
Peniche (IV)	2–2 (aet, p. 3–1)	Fafe (IV)
Rio Maior (IV)	0–1	Paredes (IV)
Oriental (III)	1–0	Silves (IV)
Camacha (IV)	1–0	Moreirense (III)
Messinense (IV)	2–1	Praiense (III)
Caniçal (III)	3–0	Beira-Mar de Monte Gordo (III)
Bragança (IV)	2–0	1° de Dezembro (IV)
Castrense (IV)	2–3	Carregado (III)
Leça (IV)	1–3	Chaves (III)
Infesta (III)	3–3 (aet, p. 3–2)	Machico (IV)
Vigor da Mocidade (IV)	3–3 (aet, p. 7–8)	Limianos (IV)
Farense (IV)	0–2	Torre de Moncorvo (IV)
Marinhense (IV)	2–3	Rabo de Peixe (IV)
Tirsense (III)	2–1	Penalva do Castelo (III)
Mirandela (III)	1–4	Pinhalnovense (III)
São João de Ver (IV)	0–2 (aet)	Atlético C. P. (III)
Torres Novas (IV)	0–1	Lousada (III)
Padroense (IV)	3–0	Vilaverdense (IV)
Fão (IV)	1–3	Mafra (III)
Crato (IV)	2–1	Eléctrico F. C. (III)
Penafiel (III)	3–0	Casa Pia (IV)

Home team	Score	Away team
Valecambrense (IV)	1–2	Campinense (IV)
Sourense (IV)	2–0	Avanca (IV)
Merelinense (IV)	1–0	Vianense (III)
Gândara (IV)	3–1	Câmara de Lobos (IV)
Vieira (IV)	1–0	Oliveira do Douro (IV)
Lusitano Évora (IV)	1–1 (aet, p. 3–5)	Fiães (IV)
Sertanense (IV)	1–0	Tocha (IV)
Espinho (III)	1–2	Lusitânia Lourosa (III)
Odivelas (III)	5–0	Alpendorada (IV)
Angrense (IV)	1–0	Quarteirense (IV)
Milheiroense (IV)	2–0	Unhais da Serra (IV)
Juventude Évora (IV)	0–1	Sintrense (IV)
Sátão (IV)	1–1 (aet, p. 4–5)	Rebordosa (IV)
Cova da Piedade (IV)	3–0^{1}	Maia (IV)
Tondela (IV)	1–1 (aet, p. 2–3)	Cartaxo (IV)
SC Marítimo (IV)	1–2	Sanjoanense (III)
Atalaia do Campo (IV)	1–2 (aet)	Santana (III)
Amarante (III)	1–2	Ribeirão (III)
Capelense (IV)	0–2	Aliados de Lordelo (III)
Prado (IV)	2–3	Maria da Fonte (III)
União de Lamas (IV)	1–0	Aljustrelense (III)
Lousanense (IV)	1–4	Atlético de Reguengos (IV)
Águeda (IV)	0–1 (aet)	Ribeira Brava (III)
Monsanto (III)	2–2 (aet, p. 2–3)	Olivais e Moscavide (III)
Pombal (IV)	0–3	Joane (IV)
Penamacorense (IV)	2–1	Igreja Nova (IV)
Atlético de Valdevez (III)	2–0	União da Serra (III)
Vila Real (IV)	2–0	União Micaelense (IV)
Boavista de São Mateus (IV)	1–1 (aet, p. 4–2)	Nelas (III)
Vitória do Pico (IV)	2–2 (aet, p. 4–5)	Arouca (III)

^{1}Maia were disqualified from the competition.
Note: Roman numerals in brackets denote the league tier the clubs participate in during the 2008–09 season.

== Second round ==
This round featured winners from the previous round, teams that received a bye in the first round and all teams from Liga de Honra (2nd level). The matches were played on September 13 and 14, 2008.

Home team	Score	Away team
Penamacorense (IV)	0–3	Desportivo das Aves (II)
Atlético de Valdevez (III)	2–1 (aet)	U.D. Oliveirense (II)
Académico Viseu (IV)	1–2 (aet)	Vizela (II)
Coimbrőes (IV)	1–1 (aet, p. 2–4)	Fátima (III)
Vieira (IV)	0–1	Camacha (IV)
Carregado (III)	1–3	União de Leiria (II)
Futebol Benfica (IV)	0–1	Rebordosa (IV)
Sporting da Covilhã (II)	3–0	Milheiroense (IV)
Torreense (III)	3–0	Oliveira do Bairro (III)
Crato (IV)	2–3	Portimonense (II)
Limianos (IV)	1–3	Beira-Mar (II)
Lusitânia dos Açores (IV)	0–3	Angrense (IV)
Fornos de Algodres (IV)	1–2	Operário (III)
Santa Clara (II)	1–0	Fiães (IV)
Portosantense (IV)	0–1 (aet)	Fabril (IV)
Pinhalnovense (III)	2–0	Atlético C. P. (III)
Tirsense (III)	0–1	Olivais e Moscavide (III)
Sanjoanense (III)	1–0	Cova da Piedade (IV)
Ribeira Brava (III)	1–1 (aet, p. 3–5)	Cinfães (IV)
Mafra (III)	2–2 (aet, p. 4–5)	Sertanense (IV)
Boavista de São Mateus (IV)	2–1	Lusitânia Lourosa (III)
Oriental (III)	0–1	Feirense (II)
Boavista (II)	2–0	Elvas (IV)

Home team	Score	Away team
Amares (IV)	3–1 (aet)	Mondinense (IV)
Campinense (IV)	1–3	União da Madeira (III)
Mãe d'Água (IV)	2–3	Gândara (IV)
Estoril (II)	1–0	Bragança (IV)
Ribeirão (III)	1–1 (aet, p. 4–3)	Joane (IV)
Aliados de Lordelo (III)	1–0	Real S.C. (III)
Marinhas (IV)	2–5 (aet)	Odivelas (III)
Caniçal (III)	5–0	Vila Meã (IV)
Penafiel (III)	1–0	Vila Real (IV)
Esmoriz (III)	2–0	A.C. Cacém (IV)
Messinense (IV)	0–4	Olhanense (II)
Padroense (IV)	0–3 (aet)	Gondomar (II)
Atlético de Reguengos (IV)	3–0	Caldas (IV)
Lagoa (III)	0–2	Chaves (III)
Varzim (II)	7–0	Lixa (IV)
Lousada (III)	2–0	Infesta (III)
Torre de Moncorvo (IV)	3–1	Serzedelo (IV)
Santana (III)	7–0	Cartaxo (IV)
Gil Vicente (II)	1–0	Louletano (IV)
Merelinense (IV)	0–1 (aet)	Freamunde (II)
Peniche (IV)	5–0	Sourense (IV)
Sintrense (IV)	0–1	Arouca (III)
Abrantes (III)	0–3^{1}	Paredes (IV)
União de Lamas (IV)	4–1	Rabo de Peixe (IV)
Madalena (IV)	2–3 (aet)	Maria da Fonte (III)

^{1}Abrantes were disqualified from the competition.
Note: Roman numerals in brackets denote the league tier the clubs participate in during the 2008–09 season.

== Third round ==
In this round entered winners from the previous round as well as all teams from Portuguese Liga. The matches were played on October 18 and 19, 2008.

Team 1	Score	Team 2
Vitória de Setúbal	1–0	Ribeirão (III)
Arouca (III)	0–0 (aet, p. 3–1)	Marítimo
Paços de Ferreira	3–0	Rebordosa (IV)
União de Leiria (II)	0–1	Sporting CP
Sertanense (IV)	0–4	Porto
Chaves (III)	0–1	Braga
Esmoriz (III)	4–3 (aet)	Maria da Fonte (III)
Vitória de Guimarães	4–2	União de Lamas (IV)
Sanjoanense (III)	1–1 (aet, p. 4–5)	Gondomar (II)
Desportivo das Aves (II)	6–1	Gândara(IV)
Benfica	0–0 (aet, p. 5–3)	Penafiel (III)
Torreense (III)	0–2	Académica de Coimbra
Santa Clara (II)	1–0	Freamunde (II)
Nacional	4–0	Angrense (IV)
Olhanense (II)	1–1 (aet, p. 1–4)	Atlético de Valdevez (III)
Gil Vicente (II)	3–2 (aet)	Rio Ave
Fátima (III)	1–1 (aet, p. 4–2)	Feirense (II)
Beira-Mar (II)	3–0	Atlético de Reguengos (IV)
Aliados de Lordelo (III)	0–1	Trofense
Paredes (IV)	1–2	Cinfães (IV)
Amares (IV)	0–3	Belenenses
Boavista de São Mateus (IV)	0–1	Naval 1º de Maio
Portimonense (II)	1–1	Pinhalnovense (III)
Leixões	4–1 (aet)	Caniçal (III)
Sporting da Covilhã (II)	1–2 (aet)	Varzim (II)
Boavista (II)	1–0	Lousada (III)
Estrela da Amadora	2–0	Operário (III)
Santana (III)	1–0	Odivelas (III)
Vizela (II)	3–0	Estoril (II)
União da Madeira (III)	2–1	Camacha (IV)
Fabril (IV)	0–1	Olivais e Moscavide (III)
Peniche (IV)	1–3	Torre de Moncorvo (IV)

Note: Roman numerals in brackets denote the league tier the clubs participate in during the 2008–09 season.

== Fourth round ==
In this round entered winners from the previous round. The matches were played on November 8, 9 and 10, 2008.

Team 1	Score	Team 2
Boavista (II)	0–2	Vitória de Guimarães
Torre de Moncorvo (IV)	0–4	Vitória de Setúbal
Naval 1º de Maio	3–2 (aet)	Belenenses
Atlético de Valdevez (III)	1–0	Gil Vicente (II)
Cinfães (IV)	1–0	Fátima (III)
Académica de Coimbra	0–1	Estrela da Amadora
Olivais e Moscavide (III)	2–0	Beira-Mar (II)
Arouca (III)	0–0 (aet, p. 1–3)	Paços de Ferreira
Vizela (II)	3–1	Esmoriz (III)
Gondomar (II)	0–2	Trofense
Leixões	3–0 (aet)	Santana (III)
Portimonense (II)	3–0	Varzim (II)
Benfica	3–0	Desportivo das Aves (II)
Sporting CP	1–1 (aet, p. 4–5)	Porto
Santa Clara (II)	2–0	União da Madeira (III)
Nacional	1–0	Braga

Note: Roman numerals in brackets denote the league tier the clubs participate in during the 2008–09 season.

== Fifth round ==
In this round entered winners from the previous round. The matches were played on December 13 and 14, 2008.

Team 1	Score	Team 2
Vitória de Setúbal	0–1	Vitória de Guimarães
Atlético de Valdevez (III)	3–1	Santa Clara (II)
Estrela da Amadora	1–0 (aet)	Olivais e Moscavide (III)
Paços de Ferreira	4–1	Vizela (II)
Leixões	0–0 (aet, p. 5–4)	Benfica
Cinfães (IV)	1–4	Porto
Trofense	2–4	Nacional
Naval 1º de Maio	3–0	Portimonense (II)

Note: Roman numerals in brackets denote the league tier the clubs participate in during the 2008–09 season.

== Quarterfinals ==
The matches were played on January 28, 29 and February 17, 2009.

Team 1	Score	Team 2
Paços de Ferreira	5–3	Naval 1º de Maio
Porto	1–0	Leixões
Atlético de Valdevez (III)	1–1 (aet, p. 1–3)	Nacional
Vitória de Guimarães	0–1	Estrela da Amadora

Note: Roman numerals in brackets denote the league tier the clubs participate in during the 2008–09 season.

== Semifinals ==
The draw was held on February 5, 2009. The first legs were played on March 3 and 22, 2009. The second legs was played on April 22, 2009.

=== First legs ===
3 March 2009
19:00 UTC

Paços de Ferreira	2–2	Nacional
Leandro Tatu 16'; Dedé 62'		Mateus 27'; Nenê 33'

Estádio da Mata Real, Paços de Ferreira

22 March 2009
20:45 UTC

Porto	2–0	Estrela da Amadora
L. González 34' (pen.); Meireles 39'

Estádio do Dragão, Porto

=== Second legs ===
22 April 2009
18:15 UTC+1

Nacional	2–3	Paços de Ferreira
Luís Alberto 40'; Mateus 47'		Pedrinha 16' (pen.), 90' (pen.); Rui Miguel 21'

Estádio da Madeira, Funchal

Paços de Ferreira won 5–4 on aggregate

22 April 2009
20:30 UTC+1

Estrela da Amadora	2–1	Porto
Varela 33'; Anselmo 42'		Farías 4'

Estádio José Gomes, Amadora

Porto won 3–2 on aggregate

== Final ==
31 May 2009
17:00 WEST

Paços de Ferreira	0–1	Porto
	Report	Lisandro López 6'

Estádio Nacional, Oeiras
Attendance: 37,600
Referee: Paulo Costa (Porto)
