= 2009–10 Terceira Divisão =

Terceira Divisão
- Season: 2009–10

The 2009–10 Terceira Divisão season was the 63rd season of the competition and the 20th season of recognised fourth-tier football in Portugal.

== Overview ==
The league was contested by 94 teams in 8 divisions of 10 to 12 teams.

== Terceira Divisão – Série A ==
Série A – Preliminary League Table

Pos	Team	Pld	W	D	L	GF	GA	GD	Pts
1	CA Macedo Cavaleiros	22	14	4	4	38	18	+20	46
2	SC Mirandela	22	13	5	4	35	20	+15	44
3	GD Bragança	22	12	4	6	33	22	+11	40
4	SC Valenciano	22	9	7	6	27	26	+1	34
5	SC Maria da Fonte	22	9	7	6	26	23	+3	34
6	AD Os Limianos	22	9	5	8	26	24	+2	32
7	CDC Montalegre	22	8	5	9	28	31	−3	29
8	Santa Maria FC	22	8	3	11	30	32	−2	27
9	CF Fão	22	7	2	13	26	34	−8	23
10	FC Amares	22	7	1	14	20	32	−12	22
11	FC Marinhas	22	5	6	11	18	26	−8	21
12	Morais FC	22	6	1	15	23	42	−19	19

Série A – Promotion Group

Pos	Team	Pld	W	D	L	GF	GA	GD	BP	Pts	Promotion
1	AC Macedo Cavaleiros	10	4	5	1	14	11	+3	23	40	Promotion to Segunda Divisão
2	GD Bragança	10	4	4	2	10	6	+4	20	36	Promotion to Segunda Divisão
3	SC Mirandela	10	2	6	2	7	9	−2	22	34	
4	SC Maria da Fonte	10	2	6	2	12	13	−1	17	29	
5	SC Valenciano	10	1	6	3	12	14	−2	17	26	
6	AD Os Limianos	10	1	5	4	10	12	−2	16	24	

Série A – Relegation Group

Pos	Team	Pld	W	D	L	GF	GA	GD	BP	Pts	Relegation
1	FC Amares	10	6	3	1	14	9	+5	11	32	
2	Santa Maria FC	10	5	2	3	16	14	+2	14	31	
3	CF Fão	10	5	3	2	16	13	+3	12	30	
4	CDC Montalegre	10	3	5	2	20	13	+7	15	29	Relegation to Distritais
5	FC Marinhas	10	2	3	5	10	15	−5	11	20	Relegation to Distritais
6	Morais FC	10	0	2	8	7	19	−12	10	12	Relegation to Distritais

== Terceira Divisão – Série B ==
Série B – Preliminary League Table

Pos	Team	Pld	W	D	L	GF	GA	GD	Pts
1	GD Joane	22	10	7	5	30	25	+5	37
2	Amarante FC	22	9	9	4	29	23	+6	36
3	AD Oliveirense	22	11	3	8	32	24	+8	36
4	AD Fafe	22	10	6	6	30	23	+7	36
5	FC Famalicão	22	10	5	7	33	23	+10	35
6	AC Vila Meã	22	10	5	7	32	25	+7	35
7	Leça FC	22	9	7	6	29	21	+8	34
8	GD Torre de Moncorvo	22	6	9	7	25	26	−1	27
9	Rebordosa AC	22	6	7	9	30	38	−8	25
10	FC Infesta	22	4	11	7	33	37	−4	23
11	GD Serzedelo	22	7	2	13	27	35	−8	23
12	Pedrouços AC	22	2	5	15	23	53	−30	11

Série B – Promotion Group

Pos	Team	Pld	W	D	L	GF	GA	GD	BP	Pts	Promotion
1	AD Oliveirense	10	5	4	1	15	6	+9	18	37	Promotion to Segunda Divisão
2	AD Fafe	10	4	4	2	10	6	+4	18	34	Promotion to Segunda Divisão
3	FC Famalicão	10	3	5	2	11	11	0	18	32	
4	AC Vila Meã	10	3	4	3	9	12	−3	18	31	
5	GD Joane	10	2	5	3	6	7	−1	19	30	
6	Amarante FC	10	2	0	8	8	17	−9	18	24	

Série B – Relegation Group

Pos	Team	Pld	W	D	L	GF	GA	GD	BP	Pts	Relegation
1	Rebordosa AC	10	6	3	1	20	11	+9	13	34	
2	GD Serzedelo	10	6	2	2	21	12	+9	12	32	
3	Leça FC	10	4	2	4	13	10	+3	17	31	
4	GD Torre de Moncorvo	10	5	2	3	22	21	+1	14	31	Relegation to Distritais
5	FC Infesta	10	1	5	4	13	13	0	12	20	Relegation to Distritais
6	Pedrouços AC	10	0	2	8	10	32	−22	6	8	Relegation to Distritais

== Terceira Divisão – Série C ==
Série C – Preliminary League Table

Pos	Team	Pld	W	D	L	GF	GA	GD	Pts
1	SC Coimbrões	22	10	7	5	37	17	+20	37
2	AA Avanca	22	10	7	5	30	21	+9	37
3	Fiães SC	22	10	4	8	32	30	+2	34
4	SC Penalva Castelo	22	7	12	3	30	24	+6	33
5	CD Candal	22	9	6	7	32	28	+4	33
6	FC Cesarense	22	9	5	8	30	27	+3	32
7	CF Oliveira do Douro	22	9	5	8	38	42	−4	32
8	CD Cinfães	22	8	8	6	38	31	+7	32
9	SC São João de Ver	22	8	6	8	30	27	+3	30
10	GD Milheiroense	22	7	5	10	29	35	−6	26
11	SC Mêda	22	6	7	9	22	30	−8	25
12	AD Sanjoanense	22	1	4	17	19	55	−36	7

Série C – Promotion Group

Pos	Team	Pld	W	D	L	GF	GA	GD	BP	Pts	Promotion
1	SC Coimbrões	10	5	4	1	16	9	+7	19	38	Promotion to Segunda Divisão
2	FC Cesarense	10	5	3	2	19	14	+5	16	34	Promotion to Segunda Divisão
3	CD Candal	10	4	4	2	14	9	+5	17	33	
4	AA Avanca	10	3	1	6	16	22	−6	19	29	
5	SC Penalva Castelo	10	2	5	3	10	16	−6	17	28	
6	Fiães SC	10	2	1	7	14	19	−5	17	24	

Série C – Relegation Group

Pos	Team	Pld	W	D	L	GF	GA	GD	BP	Pts	Relegation
1	CF Oliveira Douro	10	7	2	1	24	12	+12	16	39	
2	SC São João de Ver	10	4	4	2	21	15	+6	15	31	
3	CD Cinfães	10	3	4	3	16	11	+5	16	29	
4	SC Mêda	10	5	1	4	19	16	+3	13	29	Relegation to Distritais
5	GD Milheiroense	10	2	2	6	11	21	−10	13	21	Relegation to Distritais
6	AD Sanjoanense	10	1	3	6	11	27	−16	4	10	Relegation to Distritais

== Terceira Divisão – Série D ==
Série D – Preliminary League Table

Pos	Team	Pld	W	D	L	GF	GA	GD	Pts
1	SC Pombal	22	15	4	3	33	14	+19	49
2	Anadia FC	22	12	7	3	31	17	+14	43
3	GD Sourense	22	11	8	3	27	17	+10	41
4	AD Fornos de Algodres	22	12	5	5	38	21	+17	41
5	UD Gândara	22	10	5	7	36	28	+8	35
6	GD Mangualde	22	9	5	8	25	23	+2	32
7	Benfica Castelo Branco	22	7	9	6	29	28	+1	30
8	UD da Tocha	22	7	7	8	32	30	+2	28
9	GR Vigor Mocidade	22	7	5	10	24	28	−4	26
10	AD Penamacorense	22	2	8	12	17	37	−20	14
11	CD Alcains	22	2	6	14	16	35	−19	12
12	Sport Lisboa e Nelas	22	2	3	17	15	45	−30	9

Série D – Promotion Group

Pos	Team	Pld	W	D	L	GF	GA	GD	BP	Pts	Promotion
1	Anadia FC	10	5	3	2	21	13	+8	22	40	Promotion to Segunda Divisão
2	SC Pombal	10	3	3	4	13	13	0	25	37	Promotion to Segunda Divisão
3	AD Fornos de Algodres	10	4	3	3	15	13	+2	21	36	
4	UD Gândara	10	5	2	3	17	13	+4	18	35	
5	GD Sourense	10	2	4	4	9	14	−5	21	31	
6	GD Mangualde	10	1	5	4	12	21	−9	16	24	

Série D – Relegation Group

Pos	Team	Pld	W	D	L	GF	GA	GD	BP	Pts	Relegation
1	UD da Tocha	10	6	4	0	26	6	+20	14	36	
2	Benfica Castelo Branco	10	5	3	2	32	13	+19	15	33	
3	GR Vigor Mocidade	10	6	2	2	21	6	+15	13	33	
4	AD Penamacorense	10	3	4	3	31	18	+13	7	20	Relegation to Distritais
5	CD Alcains	10	0	5	5	11	23	−12	6	11	Relegation to Distritais
6	Sport Lisboa e Nelas	10	0	2	8	9	64	−55	5	7	Relegation to Distritais

== Terceira Divisão – Série E ==
Série E – Preliminary League Table

Pos	Team	Pld	W	D	L	GF	GA	GD	Pts
1	SCU Torreense	22	17	3	2	45	17	+28	54
2	Casa Pia AC	22	15	4	3	38	11	+27	49
3	GD Alcochetense	22	12	4	6	35	19	+16	40
4	SU 1º Dezembro	22	10	6	6	38	24	+14	36
5	AC Tojal	22	10	4	8	26	23	+3	34
6	AD Oeiras	22	8	8	6	32	27	+5	32
7	Caldas SC	22	8	3	11	30	37	−7	27
8	GD Peniche	22	6	6	10	32	39	−7	24
9	AD Portomosense	22	4	10	8	21	33	−12	22
10	SU Sintrense	22	6	4	12	28	31	−3	22
11	CF Os Gavionenses	22	3	4	15	16	54	−38	13
12	CD Olivais e Moscavide	22	2	6	14	13	39	−26	12

Série E – Promotion Group

Pos	Team	Pld	W	D	L	GF	GA	GD	BP	Pts	Promotion
1	Casa Pia AC	10	7	3	0	25	10	+15	25	49	Promotion to Segunda Divisão
2	SCU Torreense	10	7	1	2	16	8	+8	27	49	Promotion to Segunda Divisão
3	GD Alcochetense	10	2	4	4	6	13	−7	20	30	
4	SU 1º Dezembro	10	3	1	6	13	16	−3	18	28	
5	AC Tojal	10	3	1	6	16	20	−4	17	27	
6	AD Oeiras	10	2	2	6	12	21	−9	16	24	

Série E – Relegation Group

Pos	Team	Pld	W	D	L	GF	GA	GD	BP	Pts	Relegation
1	SU Sintrense	10	5	3	2	16	11	+5	11	29	
2	Caldas SC	10	5	0	5	25	23	+2	14	29	
3	GD Peniche	10	4	2	4	12	13	−1	12	26	
4	AD Portomosense	10	4	1	5	20	18	+2	11	24	Relegation to Distritais
5	CF Os Gavionenses	10	4	2	4	12	16	−4	7	21	Relegation to Distritais
6	CD Olivais e Moscavide	10	2	4	4	9	13	−4	6	16	Relegation to Distritais

== Terceira Divisão – Série F ==
Série F – Preliminary League Table

Pos	Team	Pld	W	D	L	GF	GA	GD	Pts
1	Juventude Évora	22	14	5	3	45	21	+24	47
2	CD Cova Piedade	22	11	9	2	30	18	+12	42
3	GD Pescadores	22	11	5	6	32	25	+7	38
4	SC Farense	22	9	9	4	31	22	+9	36
5	CF Esperanca Lagos	22	10	4	8	34	30	+4	34
6	GD Beira-Mar	22	9	7	6	26	28	−2	34
7	GD Fabril do Barreiro	22	7	5	10	17	23	−6	26
8	CDR Quarteirense	22	5	9	8	29	35	−6	24
9	Moura AC	22	5	8	9	28	36	−8	23
10	FC Castrense	22	4	6	12	24	38	−14	18
11	União Montemor	22	4	6	12	24	32	−8	18
12	Lusitano GC Évora	22	2	9	11	19	31	−12	15

Série F – Promotion Group

Pos	Team	Pld	W	D	L	GF	GA	GD	BP	Pts	Promotion
1	Juventude Évora	10	6	1	3	21	6	+15	24	43	Promotion to Segunda Divisão
2	SC Farense	10	5	2	3	9	7	+2	18	35	Promotion to Segunda Divisão
3	CD Cova Piedade	10	4	2	4	9	11	−2	21	35	
4	GD Pescadores	10	2	5	3	10	9	+1	19	30	
5	CF Esperanca Lagos	10	3	2	5	14	17	−3	17	28	
6	GD Beira Mar	10	2	4	4	6	19	−13	17	27	

Série F – Relegation Group

Pos	Team	Pld	W	D	L	GF	GA	GD	BP	Pts	Relegation
1	GD Fabril do Barreiro	10	6	3	1	23	13	+10	13	34	
2	Moura AC	10	5	3	2	24	15	+9	12	30	
3	CDR Quarteirense	10	5	0	5	18	16	+2	12	27	
4	União Montemor	10	5	3	2	15	13	+2	9	27	Relegation to Distritais
5	Lusitano GC Évora	10	2	2	6	10	18	−8	8	16	Relegation to Distritais
6	FC Castrense	10	1	1	8	10	25	−15	9	13	Relegation to Distritais

== Terceira Divisão – Série Açores ==
Série Açores – Preliminary League Table

Pos	Team	Pld	W	D	L	GF	GA	GD	Pts
1	FC Madalena	18	14	1	3	36	14	+22	43
2	Capelense SC	18	11	3	4	28	17	+11	36
3	Boavista de Sao Mateus	18	9	6	3	28	18	+10	33
4	Santiago FC	18	9	2	7	43	26	+17	29
5	SC Lusitânia	18	8	4	6	24	21	+3	28
6	SC Angrense	18	7	3	8	28	19	+9	24
7	CU Micaelense	18	6	2	10	21	30	−9	20
8	CD Rabo de Peixe	18	5	4	9	19	31	−12	19
9	SC Barreiro	18	2	7	9	20	33	−13	13
10	FC dos Flamengos	18	2	2	14	15	53	−38	8

Série Açores – Promotion Group

Pos	Team	Pld	W	D	L	GF	GA	GD	BP	Pts	Promotion
1	FC Madalena	6	3	0	3	8	7	+1	43	52	Promotion to Segunda Divisão
2	Boavista de Sao Mateus	6	3	1	2	10	6	+4	33	43	
3	Santiago FC	6	3	3	0	9	4	+5	29	41	
4	Capelense SC	6	0	2	4	1	11	−10	36	38	

Série Açores – Relegation Group

Pos	Team	Pld	W	D	L	GF	GA	GD	BP	Pts	Relegation
1	SC Angrense	10	7	1	2	20	11	+9	24	46	
2	SC Lusitânia	10	4	2	4	18	12	+6	28	42	
3	CU Micaelense	10	5	4	1	18	15	+3	20	39	
4	SC Barreiro	10	3	3	4	14	20	−6	13	25	Relegation to Distritais
5	CD Rabo de Peixe	10	1	3	6	5	12	−7	19	25	Relegation to Distritais
6	FC dos Flamengos	10	2	3	5	17	22	−5	8	17	Relegation to Distritais

== Terceira Divisão – Série Madeira ==
Série Madeira – Preliminary League Table

Pos	Team	Pld	W	D	L	GF	GA	GD	Pts
1	CF Caniçal	22	12	9	1	51	23	+28	45
2	CF Andorinha	22	11	7	4	38	23	+15	40
3	CD Ribeira Brava	22	11	7	4	32	18	+14	40
4	CD Portosantense	22	9	9	4	36	17	+19	36
5	CSD Câmara de Lobos	22	10	6	6	28	26	+2	36
6	Estrela da Calheta FC	22	9	6	7	37	30	+7	33
7	CF União	22	8	8	6	34	29	+5	32
8	GR Cruzado Canicense	22	6	9	7	31	37	−6	27
9	AD Machico	22	4	11	7	27	34	−7	23
10	CD 1º Maio Funchal	22	5	6	11	29	39	−10	21
11	AD Porto da Cruz	22	2	5	15	17	46	−29	11
12	CDC Porto Moniz	22	2	3	17	23	61	−38	9

Série Madeira – Promotion Group

Pos	Team	Pld	W	D	L	GF	GA	GD	BP	Pts	Promotion
1	CF Andorinha	10	8	1	1	24	13	+11	20	45	Promotion to Segunda Divisão
2	CF Caniçal	10	7	1	2	22	14	+8	23	45	
3	CD Ribeira Brava	10	4	1	5	11	13	−2	20	33	
4	CD Portosantense	10	4	2	4	19	11	+8	18	32	
5	CSD Câmara de Lobos	10	3	0	7	9	14	−5	18	27	
6	Estrela da Calheta FC	10	1	1	8	9	29	−20	17	21	

Série Madeira – Relegation Group

Pos	Team	Pld	W	D	L	GF	GA	GD	BP	Pts	Relegation
1	CD 1º Maio Funchal	10	6	1	3	14	7	+7	11	30	
2	GR Cruzado Canicense	10	4	4	2	14	10	+4	14	30	
3	AD Machico	10	6	0	4	14	12	+2	12	30	Relegation to Distritais
4	AD Porto da Cruz	10	6	2	2	19	12	+7	6	26	Relegation to Distritais
5	CF União	10	2	3	5	13	17	−4	16	25	Relegation to Distritais
6	CDC Porto Moniz	10	0	2	8	10	26	−16	5	7	Relegation to Distritais
