= 2009–10 Segunda Divisão =

Segunda Divisão
- Season: 2009–10
- Champions: FC Arouca
- Promoted: FC Arouca; Moreirense FC
- Relegated: 13 teams

The 2009–10 Segunda Divisão season was the 76th season of the competition and the 63rd season of recognised third-tier football in Portugal. Fátima were the defending champions.

== Summary ==
Location of teams in Portuguese Second Division 2009–10
Location of teams in Portuguese Second Division 2009–10
Location of teams in Portuguese Second Division 2009–10

The league was contested by 47 teams in 3 divisions with FC Arouca, Moreirense FC and União da Madeira winning the respective divisional competitions and the former two teams gaining promotion to the Liga de Honra. The overall championship was won by FC Arouca.

== Zona Norte ==
=== Stadia and locations ===
Club	City	Stadium	Capacity
Aliados Lordelo	Paredes	Parteira, Lordelo	5,000
Boavista	Porto	Estádio do Bessa	30,000
Espinho	Espinho	Estádio Comendador Manuel Violas	7,500
Gondomar	Gondomar	Estádio de São Miguel	2,450
Lourosa	Lourosa	Estádio do Lusitania FC	11,000
Lousada	Lousada	Estádio Municipal de Lousada	3,000
Merelinense	Braga	Estádio João Soares Vieira	5,000
Moreirense	Moreira de Cónegos	Comendador Joaquim De Almeida Freitas	9,000
Padroense	Padrão da Légua, Matosinhos	Estádio do Padroense FC	3,000
Paredes	Paredes	Cidade Desportiva de Paredes	1,500
Ribeirão	Vila Nova de Famalicão	Estádio do Passal	3,000
Tirsense	Santo Tirso	Abel Alves de Figueiredo	15,000
Vianense	Viana do Castelo	Dr. José De Matos	3,000
Vieira	Vieira do Minho	Municipal de Vieira do Minho	2,500
Vizela	Vizela	Estádio do Futebol Clube de Vizela	3,500

=== League table ===
Pos	Team	Pld	W	D	L	GF	GA	GD	Pts	Qualification or relegation
1	Moreirense FC (A)	28	21	3	4	49	19	+30	66	Qualification to championship play-offs
2	FC Tirsense	28	15	7	6	42	25	+17	52	
3	FC Vizela	28	13	10	5	41	24	+17	49	
4	Gondomar SC	28	14	5	9	39	30	+9	47	
5	SC Espinho	28	10	10	8	36	34	+2	40	
6	GD Ribeirão	28	9	11	8	34	32	+2	38	
7	Boavista FC	28	10	7	11	34	38	−4	37	
8	Merelinense FC	28	9	8	11	27	27	0	35	
9	AD Lousada	28	10	5	13	26	37	−11	35	
10	Aliados FC Lordelo	28	10	4	14	26	26	0	34	
11	Padroense FC	28	10	4	14	33	43	−10	34	
12	USC Paredes (R)	28	9	6	13	32	34	−2	33	Relegation to Terceira Divisão
13	SC Vianense (R)	28	9	6	13	35	44	−9	33	Relegation to Terceira Divisão
14	Lusitânia Lourosa (R)	28	8	6	14	31	46	−15	30	Relegation to Terceira Divisão
15	Vieira SC (R)	28	3	8	17	20	46	−26	17	Relegation to Terceira Divisão

Rules for classification: 1) points; 2) goal difference; 3) number of goals scored.
(A) Advance to a further round; (R) Relegated

== Zona Centro ==
=== Stadia and locations ===
Club	City	Stadium	Capacity
Académico de Viseu	Viseu	Estádio do Fontelo	15,000
Arouca	Arouca	Estádio Municipal de Arouca	2,500
Eléctrico	Ponte de Sor	Municipal de Ponte de Sôr	1,500
Esmoriz	Esmoriz	Barrinha	2,500
Mafra	Mafra	Campo Doutor Mário Silveira	2,500
Marinhense	Marinha Grande	Municipal da Marinha Grande	6,000
Monsanto	Alcanena	Campo do Pião	1,000
Oliveira do Bairro	Oliveira do Bairro	Estádio Municipal De Oliveira Do Bairro	1,500
Operário	Lagoa, Azores	João Gualberto Borges Arruda	2,500
Pampilhosa	Pampilhosa da Serra	Germano Godinho	5,000
Praiense	Praia da Vitória	Municipal da Praia da Vitória	1,500
Sertanense	Sertã	Campo de Jogos Dr. Marques Santos	4,500
Tondela	Tondela	Estádio João Cardoso	2,500
Tourizense	Touriz - Tábua	Visconde do Vinhal	1,200
União da Serra	Santa Catarina da Serra	Campo da Portela	2,500
Vitória do Pico	Pico, Azores	Campo do Vitória Futebol Clube	2,000

=== League table ===
Pos	Team	Pld	W	D	L	GF	GA	GD	Pts	Qualification or relegation
1	FC Arouca (A)	30	17	6	7	41	23	+18	57	Qualification to championship play-offs
2	FC Pampilhosa	30	15	7	8	47	31	+16	52	
3	GD Tourizense	30	14	8	8	35	25	+10	50	
4	CD Tondela	30	14	6	10	50	28	+22	48	
5	CD Mafra	30	12	10	8	29	26	+3	46	
6	SC Esmoriz	30	13	6	11	31	29	+2	45	
7	UD Serra	30	11	8	11	28	26	+2	41	
8	SC Praiense	30	10	11	9	25	23	+2	41	
9	Sertanense FC	30	11	7	12	31	34	−3	40	
10	Eléctrico FC	30	11	7	12	32	35	−3	40	
11	Operário dos Açores	30	11	7	12	33	33	0	40	
12	Académico Viseu (R)	30	9	9	12	34	37	−3	36	Relegation to Terceira Divisão
13	AC Marinhense (R)	30	9	7	14	20	37	−17	34	Relegation to Terceira Divisão
14	Oliveira do Bairro SC (R)	30	8	7	15	31	47	−16	31	Relegation to Terceira Divisão
15	Vitória FC do Pico (R)	30	9	4	17	29	47	−18	31	Relegation to Terceira Divisão
16	GDR Monsanto (R)	30	6	10	14	27	42	−15	28	Relegation to Terceira Divisão

Rules for classification: 1) points; 2) goal difference; 3) number of goals scored.
(A) Advance to a further round; (R) Relegated

== Zona Sul ==
=== Stadia and locations ===
Club	City	Stadium	Capacity
Aljustrelense	Aljustrel	Estádio Municipal de Aljustrel	4,500
Atlético CP	Lisbon	Estádio da Tapadinha	15,000
Atlético de Reguengos	Reguengos de Monsaraz	Campo Virgilio Durão	790
Camacha	Santa Cruz, Madeira	Campo Municipal da Nogueira	4,012
Estrela da Amadora	Amadora	Estádio José Gomes	11,635
Igreja Nova	Igreja Nova, Mafra	Campo Doutor Mário Silveira	2,500
Lagoa	Lagoa, Algarve	Estádio Capitão Josino da Costa	1,000
Louletano	Loulé	Estádio Algarve	30,305
Odivelas	Odivelas	Arnaldo Dias	3,000
Oriental	Lisbon	Campo Engenheiro Carlos Salema	8,500
Pinhalnovense	Pinhal Novo	Campo de Jogos Santos Jorge	2,000
Pontassolense	Ponta do Sol, Madeira	Campo Municipal da Ponta Do Sol	3,000
Real	Queluz	Estádio do Real SC	3,500
Santana	Santana, Madeira	Manuel Marques da Trindade	3,000
União da Madeira	Funchal	Campo de Futebol Adelino Rodrigues	3,000

=== League table ===
Pos	Team	Pld	W	D	L	GF	GA	GD	Pts	Qualification or relegation
1	União da Madeira (A)	30	23	5	2	70	25	+45	74	Qualification to championship play-offs
2	Atlético CP	30	15	8	7	41	30	+11	53	
3	Louletano	30	15	8	7	42	33	+9	53	
4	Oriental	30	14	10	6	37	25	+12	52	
5	Atlético de Reguengos	30	15	7	8	41	30	+11	52	
6	Lagoa	30	14	6	10	32	25	+7	48	
7	Pinhalnovense	30	13	7	10	41	31	+10	46	
8	Marítimo B	30	11	8	11	37	30	+7	41	
9	Pontassolense	30	12	5	13	42	45	−3	41	
10	Estrela da Amadora	30	11	8	11	26	24	+2	41	
11	Camacha	30	9	13	8	37	31	+6	40	
12	Real	30	10	9	11	38	29	+9	39	
13	Aljustrelense (R)	30	7	11	12	39	45	−6	32	Relegation to Terceira Divisão
14	Igreja Nova (R)	30	6	5	19	26	57	−31	23	Relegation to Terceira Divisão
15	Odivelas (R)	30	5	7	18	26	43	−17	22	Relegation to Terceira Divisão
16	Santana (R)	30	0	3	27	12	89	−77	3	Relegation to Terceira Divisão

Rules for classification: 1) points; 2) goal difference; 3) number of goals scored.
(A) Advance to a further round; (R) Relegated

== Play-offs ==
The play-off for Liga de Honra, the teams play each other in a home and away round robin. However, they do not all start with 0 points. Instead, a weighting system applies to the teams standing at the start of the play-off mini-league.

=== Play-off table ===
Pos	Team	Pld	W	D	L	GF	GA	GD	Pts	Promotion
1	Arouca (C, P)	4	2	0	2	4	5	−1	6	Promotion to Liga de Honra
2	Moreirense (P)	4	1	2	1	3	2	+1	5	Promotion to Liga de Honra
3	União da Madeira	4	1	2	1	2	2	0	5	

Rules for classification: 1) points; 2) head-to-head points; 3) head-to-head goal difference; 4) head-to-head goals scored; 5) goal difference; 6) number of goals scored.
(C) Champions; (P) Promoted

==== Top goalscorers ====
Rank	Player	Club	Goals
1	(Portugal) Bruninho	Arouca	1
1	(Brazil) Beré	Arouca	1
1	(Portugal) Hélder Silva	Arouca	1
1	(Portugal) Jorge Leitão	Arouca	1
1	(São Tomé and Príncipe) Luís Leal	Moreirense	1
1	(Portugal) Pintassilgo	Moreirense	1
1	(Brazil) Eriverton	Moreirense	1
1	(Brazil) Julian	União da Madeira	1
1	(Portugal) Luís Pinto	União da Madeira	1
