= 2006–07 Terceira Divisão =

Terceira Divisão
- Season: 2006–07

The 2006–07 Terceira Divisão season was the 60th season of the competition and the 17th season of recognised fourth-tier football in Portugal.

== Overview ==
The league was contested by 104 teams in 7 divisions of 10 to 16 teams.

== Terceira Divisão – Série A ==
Pos	Team	Pld	W	D	L	GF	GA	GD	Pts	Promotion or relegation
1	CDA Valdevez	30	20	5	5	45	19	+26	65	Promotion to Segunda Divisão
2	Merelinense FC	30	18	7	5	39	17	+22	61	Promotion to Segunda Divisão
3	SC Mirandela	30	14	8	8	40	32	+8	50	
4	Vieira SC	30	14	8	8	32	24	+8	50	
5	FC Marinhas	30	15	5	10	47	39	+8	50	
6	GD Joane	30	12	10	8	41	30	+11	46	
7	Brito FC	30	12	8	10	41	37	+4	44	
8	Mondinense FC	30	12	8	10	41	40	+1	44	
9	SC Vianense	30	11	9	10	37	34	+3	42	
10	CA Macedo de Cavaleiros	30	10	11	9	38	32	+6	41	
11	FC Amares	30	13	2	15	33	33	0	41	
12	União Torcatense	30	9	8	13	37	36	+1	35	Relegation to Distritais
13	CD Cerveira	30	8	3	19	32	47	−15	27	Relegation to Distritais
14	Vilaverdense FC	30	6	7	17	23	45	−22	25	Relegation to Distritais
15	AD Os Limianos	30	5	8	17	26	50	−24	23	Relegation to Distritais
16	Atlético Cabeceirense	30	5	5	20	32	69	−37	20	Relegation to Distritais

== Terceira Divisão – Série B ==
Pos	Team	Pld	W	D	L	GF	GA	GD	Pts	Promotion or relegation
1	Leça FC	30	17	10	3	47	19	+28	61	Promotion to Segunda Divisão
2	FC Tirsense	30	18	7	5	49	23	+26	61	Promotion to Segunda Divisão
3	GD Torre de Moncorvo	30	14	10	6	36	26	+10	52	
4	FC Pedras Rubras	30	13	11	6	38	33	+5	50	
5	Oliveira do Douro	30	13	7	10	46	39	+7	46	
6	Rebordosa AC	30	13	7	10	40	35	+5	46	
7	AD São Pedro da Cova	30	11	11	8	38	30	+8	44	
8	AD Oliveirense	30	12	6	12	44	29	+15	42	
9	Amarante FC	30	11	7	12	41	42	−1	40	
10	Aliados Lordelo	30	9	10	11	36	36	0	37	
11	FC Vilanovense	30	8	10	12	33	40	−7	34	Relegation to Distritais
12	CR Ataense	30	9	6	15	42	46	−4	33	Relegation to Distritais
13	AC Alijoense	30	8	7	15	21	39	−18	31	Relegation to Distritais
14	SC Vila Real	30	7	10	13	20	32	−12	31	Relegation to Distritais
15	Ermesinde FC	30	5	11	14	31	57	−26	26	Relegation to Distritais
16	Canedo FC	30	4	6	20	26	62	−36	18	Relegation to Distritais

== Terceira Divisão – Série C ==
Pos	Team	Pld	W	D	L	GF	GA	GD	Pts	Promotion or relegation
1	Anadia FC	28	15	7	6	39	25	+14	52	Promotion to Segunda Divisão
2	AD Sátão	28	14	7	7	46	37	+9	49	Promotion to Segunda Divisão
3	AD Sanjoanense	28	15	3	10	34	28	+6	48	
4	SC São João de Ver	28	14	4	10	31	34	−3	46	
5	GD Milheiroense	28	13	4	11	45	32	+13	43	
6	RCS Lamas	28	11	10	7	38	32	+6	43	
7	CD Tondela	28	11	8	9	35	31	+4	41	
8	Oliveira do Hospital	28	11	6	11	37	34	+3	39	
9	AD Valecambrense	28	11	4	13	33	30	+3	37	
10	AD Valonguense	28	10	7	11	28	31	−3	37	
11	UD Tocha	28	10	6	12	39	39	0	36	
12	GD Gafanha	28	7	12	9	25	24	+1	33	Relegation to Distritais
13	RD Águeda	28	10	2	16	29	38	−9	32	Relegation to Distritais
14	GD Santacombadense	28	7	6	15	22	41	−19	27	Relegation to Distritais
15	Paços de Brandão	28	6	4	18	26	51	−25	22	Relegation to Distritais

== Terceira Divisão – Série D ==
Pos	Team	Pld	W	D	L	GF	GA	GD	Pts	Promotion or relegation
1	Caldas SC	30	19	3	8	58	28	+30	60	Promotion to Segunda Divisão
2	Benfica Castelo Branco	30	15	12	3	46	25	+21	57	Promotion to Segunda Divisão
3	GDR Monsanto	30	15	8	7	49	35	+14	53	
4	Sertanense FC	30	12	9	9	50	33	+17	45	
5	AC Marinhense	30	11	11	8	30	26	+4	44	
6	GD Sourense	30	11	11	8	37	37	0	44	
7	GD Peniche	30	11	10	9	26	22	+4	43	
8	GC Alcobaça	30	9	14	7	29	23	+6	41	
9	Escolar Bombarralense	30	10	11	9	40	37	+3	41	
10	UD Gândara	30	10	10	10	31	33	−2	40	
11	AD Penamacorense	30	10	10	10	37	41	−4	40	
12	UD Caranguejeira	30	10	8	12	29	35	−6	38	
13	União Idanhense	30	9	6	15	30	46	−16	33	Relegation to Distritais
14	CA Riachense	30	8	8	14	34	45	−11	32	Relegation to Distritais
15	União Coimbra	30	6	6	18	27	45	−18	24	Relegation to Distritais
16	GDR Bidoeirense	30	2	7	21	27	69	−42	13	Relegation to Distritais

== Terceira Divisão – Série E ==
Pos	Team	Pld	W	D	L	GF	GA	GD	Pts	Promotion or relegation
1	CF Caniçal	30	18	7	5	66	39	+27	61	Promotion to Segunda Divisão
2	AD Carregado	30	17	8	5	61	35	+26	59	Promotion to Segunda Divisão
3	Oriental Lisboa	30	14	11	5	50	29	+21	53	
4	GD Alcochetense	30	13	10	7	41	35	+6	49	
5	UD Santana	30	13	7	10	48	39	+9	46	
6	O Elvas CAD	30	11	8	11	33	48	−15	41	
7	SL Cartaxo	30	10	9	11	46	51	−5	39	
8	CSD Câmara de Lobos	30	10	8	12	32	26	+6	38	
9	SU 1º Dezembro	30	7	16	7	32	31	+1	37	
10	Atlético Cacém	30	9	10	11	47	45	+2	37	
11	SU Sintrense	30	7	15	8	42	44	−2	36	
12	Casa Pia AC	30	8	10	12	32	45	−13	34	
13	UA Povoense	30	7	9	14	50	57	−7	30	Relegation to Distritais
14	CD Montijo	30	7	9	14	45	64	−19	30	Relegation to Distritais
15	AD Oeiras	30	5	13	12	33	46	−13	28	Relegation to Distritais
16	SC Lourel	30	6	6	18	32	56	−24	24	Relegation to Distritais

== Terceira Divisão – Série F ==
Pos	Team	Pld	W	D	L	GF	GA	GD	Pts	Promotion or relegation
1	GD Lagoa	28	17	2	9	48	29	+19	53	Promotion to Segunda Divisão
2	Juventude Évora	28	13	8	7	44	27	+17	47	Promotion to Segunda Divisão
3	Amora FC	28	13	7	8	31	31	0	46	
4	Silves FC	28	12	6	10	38	32	+6	42	
5	Vitória Setúbal B	28	13	3	12	39	39	0	42	
6	FC Ferreiras	28	12	5	11	38	37	+1	41	
7	Juventude Campinense	28	11	7	10	32	36	−4	40	
8	CD Cova da Piedade	28	11	7	10	56	41	+15	40	
9	SR Almancilense	28	11	5	12	41	38	+3	38	
10	GD Beira-Mar de Monte Gordo	28	10	8	10	33	33	0	38	
11	Lusitano Évora	28	10	7	11	34	35	−1	37	
12	CD Beja	28	11	4	13	20	30	−10	37	Relegation to Distritais
13	Atlético Reguengos de Monsaraz	28	9	7	12	38	48	−10	34	Relegation to Distritais
14	Lusitano VRSA	28	7	10	11	25	33	−8	31	Relegation to Distritais
15	FC Serpa	28	4	6	18	24	52	−28	18	Relegation to Distritais

== Terceira Divisão – Série Açores ==
Série Açores – Preliminary League Table

Pos	Team	Pld	W	D	L	GF	GA	GD	Pts
1	União Micaelense	18	11	4	3	27	16	+11	37
2	SC Angrense	18	11	4	3	28	18	+10	37
3	Marítimo Graciosa	18	10	4	4	28	18	+10	34
4	Santiago FC	18	8	5	5	28	20	+8	29
5	Fayal SC	18	7	5	6	22	22	0	26
6	SC Praiense	18	7	4	7	24	20	+4	25
7	Capelense SC	18	5	4	9	24	30	−6	19
8	Vitória FC do Pico	18	3	8	7	8	19	−11	17
9	CD Santo António	18	2	6	10	15	27	−12	12
10	Marítimo Velense	18	2	4	12	17	31	−14	10

Série Açores – Promotion Group

Pos	Team	Pld	W	D	L	GF	GA	GD	BP	Pts	Promotion
1	SC Angrense	8	5	2	1	14	6	+8	37	54	Promotion to Segunda Divisão
2	Marítimo Graciosa	8	3	3	2	13	13	0	34	46	
3	Santiago FC	8	5	1	2	9	6	+3	29	45	
4	União Micaelense	8	1	2	5	7	13	−6	37	42	
5	Fayal SC	8	2	0	6	7	12	−5	26	32	

Terceira Divisão - Série Açores Relegation Group

Pos	Team	Pld	W	D	L	GF	GA	GD	BP	Pts	Relegation
1	Capelense SC	8	5	2	1	14	4	+10	17	34	
2	SC Praiense	8	2	3	3	11	8	+3	25	34	
3	Vitória FC do Pico	8	4	4	0	13	7	+6	15	31	Relegation to Distritais
4	CD Santo António	8	3	1	4	14	13	+1	12	22	Relegation to Distritais
5	Marítimo Velense	8	0	2	6	4	24	−20	10	12	Relegation to Distritais
