= Fábio Pereira (footballer, born 1978) =

Portuguese football manager and former player

Personal information
- Full name: Gonçalo Fábio Camacho Pereira
- Date of birth: 6 December 1978 (age 47)
- Place of birth: Funchal, Portugal
- Position: Centre-back

Team information
- Current team: União Leiria (manager)

Youth career
- 1989–1997: Marítimo

Senior career*
Years	Team	Apps	(Gls)
1997–1998	São Vicente		
2001–2003	União Madeira B		
2003–2004	Andorinha		
2004	União Madeira B		
2005	Santacruzense		
2005–2008	Cruzado Canicense		
2008–2010	União Madeira B		
2010–2012	Estrela Calheta	5	(0)

Managerial career
- 2013–2014: Braga B (assistant)
- 2016–2017: Trofense (assistant)
- 2017–2018: Merelinense (assistant)
- 2018: Bougadense
- 2018–2019: Gafanha
- 2019–2020: União Madeira
- 2020–2021: Oleiros
- 2021–2023: Oliveirense
- 2023–2024: Marítimo
- 2024–2025: Vizela
- 2025–: União Leiria
- * Club domestic league appearances and goals

Gonçalo Fábio Camacho Pereira (born 6 December 1978) is a Portuguese football manager and former player who played as a centre-back. He is the current manager of União Leiria.

After winning promotion from Liga 3 with Oliveirense in 2022, he managed in Liga Portugal 2 with Oliveirense, Marítimo, Vizela and União Leiria.

== Career ==
=== Early career ===
Pereira was born in Funchal in Madeira, and was a youth player at local C.S. Marítimo. His senior career as a defender was spent at minor clubs on his native island.

Pereira began his coaching career as an assistant to Bruno Pereira at S.C. Braga B and C.D. Trofense. He was then the manager at Bougadense and G.D. Gafanha before leaving in January 2019 for C.F. União on his native island, competing in the Campeonato de Portugal. His one season there was abandoned due to the COVID-19 pandemic. In July 2020, he left for A.R.C. Oleiros.

=== Oliveirense ===
In July 2021, Pereira was appointed at U.D. Oliveirense in Liga 3. He took the team to second place in the first half of the season, followed by first place in the promotion league, but lost the title on penalties to S.C.U. Torreense; in May 2022 he extended his contract for two more years.

On 6 August 2022, Pereira won his first game at a professional level in Liga Portugal 2, 3–1 at home to C.D. Mafra. The season ended with the team from Oliveira de Azeméis in 10th place.

=== Marítimo ===
Pereira returned to Marítimo as manager of 7 December 2023, succeeding Tulipa at the second-tier club. On his debut three days later, he won 4–0 at home to Vilaverdense FC. He was confirmed by the board for another season, after finishing 2023–24 by being beaten to the final playoff place by AVS Futebol SAD following a 2–2 draw with Académico de Viseu FC.

On 4 September 2024, three games into the new season, Pereira and his staff left the Rubro-Verde club.

=== Vizela ===
On 17 December 2024, Pereira was hired at F.C. Vizela also in the second tier. He succeeded Rubén de la Barrera at the 14th-placed club.

Pereira led Vizela to an unbeaten second half of the season. They finished 3rd, but lost in the promotion/relegation playoff to AVS Futebol SAD.

=== União Leiria ===
On 5 June 2025, Pereira signed for U.D. Leiria, who had finished 6th in the previous second-tier season. He succeeded Silas, and was their fourth manager in 18 months.

== Personal life ==
Pereira's cousin Bruno Fernandes (born 1974) was also a footballer. A midfielder, he played for Madeira's three main clubs: Marítimo, C.D. Nacional and União.
