= 2010–11 Terceira Divisão =

Terceira Divisão
- Season: 2010–11

The 2010–11 Terceira Divisão season was the 64th season of the competition and the 21st season of recognised fourth-tier football in Portugal.

== Overview ==
The league was contested by 94 teams in 8 divisions of 10 to 12 teams.

== Terceira Divisão – Série A ==
Série A – Preliminary League Table

Pos	Team	Pld	W	D	L	GF	GA	GD	Pts
1	AD Os Limianos	22	12	5	5	33	19	+14	41
2	SC Mirandela	22	11	6	5	29	15	+14	39
3	SC Melgacense	22	10	7	5	25	19	+6	37
4	SC Vianense	22	10	7	5	31	17	+14	37
5	CF Fão	22	9	5	8	26	22	+4	32
6	AD Esposende	22	7	10	5	24	20	+4	31
7	SC Maria da Fonte	22	8	4	10	26	34	−8	28
8	Vieira SC	22	7	7	8	25	25	0	28
9	FC Amares	22	6	9	7	21	24	−3	27
10	Santa Maria FC	22	6	9	7	31	28	+3	27
11	Caçadores das Taipas	22	6	6	10	27	38	−11	24
12	SC Valenciano	22	1	3	18	18	55	−37	6

Série A – Promotion Group

Pos	Team	Pld	W	D	L	GF	GA	GD	BP	Pts	Promotion
1	SC Mirandela	10	6	3	1	18	8	+10	20	41	Promotion to Segunda Divisão
2	AD Os Limianos	10	3	6	1	17	12	+5	21	36	Promotion to Segunda Divisão
3	SC Vianense	10	4	4	2	14	11	+3	19	35	
4	AD Esposende	10	4	2	4	11	10	+1	16	30	
5	CF Fão	10	2	3	5	5	13	−8	16	25	
6	SC Melgacense	10	1	2	7	8	19	−11	19	24	

Série A – Relegation Group

Pos	Team	Pld	W	D	L	GF	GA	GD	BP	Pts	Relegation
1	SC Maria da Fonte	10	5	4	1	18	7	+11	14	33	
2	FC Amares	10	5	2	3	11	9	+2	14	31	
3	Santa Maria FC	10	4	4	2	12	9	+3	14	30	
4	Caçadores das Taipas	10	4	4	2	16	12	+4	12	28	Relegation to Distritais
5	Vieira SC	10	3	4	3	15	13	+2	14	27	Relegation to Distritais
6	SC Valenciano	10	0	0	10	2	24	−22	3	3	Relegation to Distritais

== Terceira Divisão – Série B ==
Série B – Preliminary League Table

Pos	Team	Pld	W	D	L	GF	GA	GD	Pts
1	FC Famalicão	22	14	4	4	35	18	+17	46
2	Amarante FC	22	13	5	4	30	15	+15	44
3	GD Joane	22	11	6	5	35	21	+14	39
4	GD Serzedelo	22	10	6	6	39	35	+4	36
5	USC Paredes	22	10	4	8	29	25	+4	34
6	UD Sousense	22	10	4	8	31	28	+3	34
7	CD Candal	22	8	8	6	32	27	+5	32
8	Rebordosa AC	22	7	7	8	38	29	+9	28
9	Leca FC	22	5	11	6	20	18	+2	26
10	AC Vila Meã	22	5	5	12	19	36	−17	20
11	Mondinense FC	22	4	7	11	31	46	−15	19
12	CF Oliveira Douro	22	0	3	19	14	55	−41	3

Série B – Promotion Group

Pos	Team	Pld	W	D	L	GF	GA	GD	BP	Pts	Promotion
1	Amarante FC	10	5	2	3	11	8	+3	22	39	Promotion to Segunda Divisão
2	FC Famalicão	10	5	1	4	12	14	−2	23	39	Promotion to Segunda Divisão
3	USC Paredes	10	7	0	3	14	8	+6	17	38	
4	GD Joane	10	4	2	4	11	9	+2	20	34	
5	GD Serzedelo	10	2	4	4	7	12	−5	18	28	
6	UD Sousense	10	2	1	7	9	13	−4	17	24	

Série B – Relegation Group

Pos	Team	Pld	W	D	L	GF	GA	GD	BP	Pts	Relegation
1	Rebordosa AC	10	6	2	2	26	14	+12	14	34	
2	Leça FC	10	5	5	0	15	9	+6	13	33	
3	AC Vila Meã	10	6	0	4	21	18	+3	10	28	
4	CD Candal	10	2	3	5	16	21	−5	16	25	Relegation to Distritais
5	Mondinense FC	10	1	3	6	14	25	−11	10	16	Relegation to Distritais
6	CF Oliveira Douro	10	2	3	5	22	27	−5	2	11	Relegation to Distritais

== Terceira Divisão – Série C ==
Série C – Preliminary League Table

Pos	Team	Pld	W	D	L	GF	GA	GD	Pts
1	SC São João Ver	22	13	7	2	43	20	+23	46
2	CD Cinfães	22	13	5	4	37	21	+16	44
3	AA Avanca	22	8	10	4	34	29	+5	34
4	FC Alpendorada	22	8	6	8	29	31	−2	30
5	SC Bustelo	22	8	6	8	23	27	−4	30
6	SC Penalva do Castelo	22	8	6	8	27	28	−1	30
7	UD Sampedrense	22	7	7	8	23	26	−3	28
8	Lusitânia Lourosa	22	5	9	8	26	32	−6	24
9	ADRC Aguiar da Beira	22	5	7	10	17	27	−10	22
10	SC Alba	22	5	7	10	16	23	−7	22
11	Fiaes SC	22	4	10	8	23	25	−2	22
12	GD Oliveira de Frades	22	4	8	10	23	32	−9	20

Série C – Promotion Group

Pos	Team	Pld	W	D	L	GF	GA	GD	BP	Pts	Promotion
1	CD Cinfães	10	8	1	1	25	9	+16	22	47	Promotion to Segunda Divisão
2	SC São João Ver	10	6	3	1	26	13	+13	23	44	Promotion to Segunda Divisão
3	SC Penalva do Castelo	10	3	3	4	18	19	−1	15	27	
4	AA Avanca	10	3	1	6	14	24	−10	17	27	
5	FC Alpendorada	10	3	1	6	10	24	−14	15	25	
6	SC Bustelo	10	2	1	7	16	20	−4	15	22	

Série C – Relegation Group

Pos	Team	Pld	W	D	L	GF	GA	GD	BP	Pts	Relegation
1	UD Sampedrense	10	4	4	2	13	11	+2	14	30	
2	SC Alba	10	5	2	3	16	10	+6	11	28	
3	GD Oliveira de Frades	10	4	3	3	15	12	+3	10	25	
4	Lusitânia Lourosa	10	3	3	4	12	14	−2	12	24	Relegation to Distritais
5	ADRC Aguiar da Beira	10	3	3	4	11	14	−3	11	23	Relegation to Distritais
6	Fiaes SC	10	2	3	5	9	15	−6	11	20	Relegation to Distritais

== Terceira Divisão – Série D ==
Série D – Preliminary League Table

Pos	Team	Pld	W	D	L	GF	GA	GD	Pts
1	GDR Monsanto	22	13	5	4	42	16	+26	44
2	AD Nogueirense	22	12	7	3	44	16	+28	43
3	Atlético Riachense	22	13	4	5	38	24	+14	43
4	Oliveira Bairro SC	22	10	7	5	29	22	+7	37
5	Academico Viseu FC	22	10	5	7	39	27	+12	35
6	GD Sourense	22	9	6	7	29	24	+5	33
7	AC Marinhense	22	9	4	9	24	22	+2	31
8	Benfica Castelo Branco	22	8	6	8	34	33	+1	30
9	UD da Tocha	22	7	4	11	29	33	−4	25
10	Águias do Moradal	22	6	6	10	22	26	−4	24
11	GR Vigor Mocidade	22	6	2	14	27	48	−21	20
12	UD Gandara	22	1	0	21	7	73	−66	3

Série D – Promotion Group

Pos	Team	Pld	W	D	L	GF	GA	GD	BP	Pts	Promotion
1	GDR Monsanto	10	5	2	3	10	8	+2	22	39	Promotion to Segunda Divisão
2	Oliveira Bairro SC	10	5	2	3	17	12	+5	19	36	Promotion to Segunda Divisão
3	Academico Viseu	10	4	4	2	17	9	+8	18	34	
4	AD Nogueirense	10	3	3	4	14	16	−2	22	34	
5	GD Sourense	10	4	2	4	16	22	−6	17	31	
6	Atlético Riachense	10	1	3	6	9	16	−7	22	28	

Série D – Relegation Group

Pos	Team	Pld	W	D	L	GF	GA	GD	BP	Pts	Relegation
1	UD da Tocha	10	5	4	1	17	7	+10	13	32	
2	AC Marinhense	10	4	3	3	15	9	+6	16	31	
3	Benfica Castelo Branco	10	4	4	2	10	8	+2	15	31	
4	Águias do Moradal	10	2	5	3	9	7	+2	12	23	Relegation to Distritais
5	GR Vigor Mocidade	10	2	3	5	8	16	−8	10	19	Relegation to Distritais
6	UD Gandara	10	2	3	5	7	19	−12	2	11	Relegation to Distritais

== Terceira Divisão – Série E ==
Série E – Preliminary League Table

Pos	Team	Pld	W	D	L	GF	GA	GD	Pts
1	SU 1º Dezembro	22	14	4	4	35	15	+20	46
2	SU Sintrense	22	12	4	6	29	17	+12	40
3	Caldas SC	22	12	3	7	27	27	0	39
4	GD Alcochetense	22	11	4	7	31	22	+9	37
5	SG Sacavenense	22	11	4	7	27	19	+8	37
6	GD Peniche	22	9	4	9	31	30	+1	31
7	SC Escolar Bombarralense	22	9	3	10	27	23	+4	30
8	FC Crato	22	8	5	9	18	23	−5	29
9	AD Oeiras	22	7	7	8	28	36	−8	28
10	Atlético Tojal	22	6	4	12	25	37	−12	22
11	Odivelas FC	22	4	4	14	12	28	−16	16
12	AC Malveira da Serra	22	3	6	13	16	29	−13	15

Série E – Promotion Group

Pos	Team	Pld	W	D	L	GF	GA	GD	BP	Pts	Promotion
1	Caldas SC	10	6	3	1	14	6	+8	20	41	Promotion to Segunda Divisão
2	SU 1º Dezembro	10	4	6	0	15	9	+6	23	41	Promotion to Segunda Divisão
3	SG Sacavenense	10	4	2	4	14	10	+4	19	33	
4	SU Sintrense	10	3	1	6	7	13	−6	20	30	
5	GD Alcochetense	10	2	4	4	11	14	−3	19	29	
6	GD Peniche	10	1	4	5	8	17	−9	16	23	

Série E – Relegation Group

Pos	Team	Pld	W	D	L	GF	GA	GD	BP	Pts	Relegation
1	SC Escolar Bombarralense	10	5	4	1	14	7	+7	15	34	
2	AD Oeiras	10	4	3	3	15	13	+2	14	29	
3	FC Crato	10	3	4	3	11	10	+1	15	28	Relegation to Distritais
4	AC Malveira da Serra	10	4	2	4	10	12	−2	8	22	Relegation to Distritais
5	Odivelas FC	10	3	3	4	11	12	−1	8	20	Relegation to Distritais
6	Atlético Tojal	10	1	4	5	9	16	−7	11	18	Relegation to Distritais

== Terceira Divisão – Série F ==
Série F – Preliminary League Table

Pos	Team	Pld	W	D	L	GF	GA	GD	Pts
1	Estrela Vendas Novas	21	14	3	4	50	21	+29	45
2	CF Esperança de Lagos	21	11	4	6	49	28	+21	37
3	GD Sesimbra	21	11	4	6	37	16	+21	37
4	Moura AC	21	9	7	5	38	27	+11	34
5	GD Fabril Barreiro	21	9	6	6	25	18	+7	33
6	Mineiro Aljustrelense	21	7	9	5	23	20	+3	30
7	GUS Montemor	21	8	5	8	31	29	+2	29
8	GD Pescadores	21	8	5	8	31	31	0	29
9	SC Odemirense	21	7	5	9	29	34	−5	26
10	UD Messinense	21	6	3	12	19	33	−14	21
11	CD Cova Piedade	21	3	5	13	15	58	−43	14
12	GD Beira-Mar	11	0	0	11	5	37	−32	0

Série F – Promotion Group

Pos	Team	Pld	W	D	L	GF	GA	GD	BP	Pts	Promotion
1	Estrela Vendas Novas	10	7	1	2	18	12	+6	23	45	Promotion to Segunda Divisão
2	Moura AC	10	5	3	2	18	10	+8	17	35	Promotion to Segunda Divisão
3	GD Sesimbra	10	4	4	2	15	11	+4	19	35	
4	CF Esperança de Lagos	10	3	5	2	14	15	−1	19	33	
5	GD Fabril Barreiro	10	2	1	7	9	13	−4	17	24	
6	Mineiro Aljustrelense	10	1	2	7	11	24	−13	15	20	

Série F – Relegation Group

Pos	Team	Pld	W	D	L	GF	GA	GD	BP	Pts	Relegation
1	UD Messinense	8	6	2	0	18	6	+12	11	31	
2	GUS Montemor	8	3	3	2	13	8	+5	15	27	
3	GD Pescadores	8	4	0	4	12	12	0	15	27	
4	SC Odemirense	8	2	3	3	7	11	−4	13	22	Relegation to Distritais
5	CD Cova Piedade	8	0	2	6	6	19	−13	7	9	Relegation to Distritais

== Terceira Divisão – Série Açores ==
Série Açores – Preliminary League Table

Pos	Team	Pld	W	D	L	GF	GA	GD	Pts
1	SC Angrense	18	12	3	3	33	15	+18	39
2	SC Lusitania	18	9	6	3	30	15	+15	33
3	Santiago FC	18	8	7	3	21	15	+6	31
4	Boavista São Mateus	18	7	8	3	24	16	+8	29
5	União Micaelense	18	6	6	6	21	23	−2	24
6	Prainha FC	18	5	6	7	14	16	−2	21
7	SC Vilanovense	18	6	3	9	19	32	−13	21
8	SC Ideal	18	5	5	8	25	27	−2	20
9	Capelense SC	18	5	5	8	23	28	−5	20
10	Vitória FC do Pico	18	0	5	13	7	30	−23	5

Série Açores – Promotion Group

Pos	Team	Pld	W	D	L	GF	GA	GD	BP	Pts	Promotion
1	SC Angrense	6	5	1	0	13	5	+8	39	55	Promotion to Segunda Divisão
2	Santiago FC	6	3	2	1	9	7	+2	31	42	
3	SC Lusitânia	6	1	0	5	5	9	−4	33	36	
4	Boavista São Mateus	6	1	1	4	6	12	−6	29	33	

Série Açores – Relegation Group

Pos	Team	Pld	W	D	L	GF	GA	GD	BP	Pts	Relegation
1	SC Ideal	10	6	2	2	19	14	+5	20	40	
2	União Micaelense	10	4	3	3	22	18	+4	24	39	
3	SC Vilanovense	10	5	2	3	20	14	+6	21	38	Relegation to Distritais
4	Prainha FC	10	5	2	3	20	16	+4	21	38	
5	Capelense SC	10	2	1	7	15	26	−11	20	27	Relegation to Distritais
6	Vitória FC do Pico	10	2	2	6	14	22	−8	5	13	Relegation to Distritais

== Terceira Divisão – Série Madeira ==
Série Madeira – Preliminary League Table

Pos	Team	Pld	W	D	L	GF	GA	GD	Pts
1	CD Ribeira Brava	22	14	5	3	40	9	+31	47
2	Cruzado Canicense	22	13	7	2	46	14	+32	46
3	CD Portosantense	22	13	5	4	39	16	+23	44
4	CSD Câmara de Lobos	22	9	9	4	29	22	+7	36
5	Estrela da Calheta FC	22	9	7	6	40	22	+18	34
6	AD Machico	22	9	7	6	34	21	+13	34
7	CD 1º Maio Funchal	22	9	4	9	31	26	+5	31
8	Juventude Gaula	22	8	6	8	36	37	−1	30
9	UD Santana	22	7	4	11	23	43	−20	25
10	SC Santacruzense	22	5	6	11	23	40	−17	21
11	AD Os Xavelhas	22	2	2	18	9	63	−54	8
12	FC Bom Sucesso	22	1	4	17	12	49	−37	7

Série Madeira – Promotion Group

Pos	Team	Pld	W	D	L	GF	GA	GD	BP	Pts	Promotion
1	CD Ribeira Brava	10	5	4	1	12	4	+8	24	43	Promotion to Segunda Divisão
2	CD Portosantense	10	6	3	1	15	9	+6	22	43	
3	Cruzado Canicense	10	4	4	2	15	10	+5	23	39	
4	CSD Câmara de Lobos	10	3	2	5	12	17	−5	18	29	
5	AD Machico	10	2	3	5	14	15	−1	17	26	
6	Estrela da Calheta FC	10	0	4	6	10	23	−13	17	21	

Série Madeira – Relegation Group

Pos	Team	Pld	W	D	L	GF	GA	GD	BP	Pts	Relegation
1	CD 1º Maio Funchal	10	7	3	0	22	11	+11	16	40	
2	UD Santana	10	6	2	2	19	11	+8	13	33	
3	Juventude Gaula	10	3	3	4	18	17	+1	15	27	Relegation to Distritais
4	SC Santacruzense	10	3	1	6	17	19	−2	11	21	Relegation to Distritais
5	FC Bom Sucesso	10	3	3	4	24	24	0	4	16	Relegation to Distritais
6	AD Os Xavelhas	10	2	0	8	8	26	−18	4	10	Relegation to Distritais
