= Edgar França =

Portuguese footballer

Personal information
- Full name: Edgar Emanuel Garcês França
- Date of birth: 8 February 1996 (age 30)
- Place of birth: Paul do Mar, Portugal
- Position: Forward

Youth career
- Estrela da Calheta
- Nacional (Madeira)

Senior career*
Years	Team	Apps	(Gls)
2017–2018	Marítimo C		
2018–2019	Camacha	20	(5)
2019–2020	Cape Umoya United	5	(0)
- * Club domestic league appearances and goals

Edgar Emanuel Garcês França (born 8 February 1996) is a Portuguese footballer who plays as a forward.

== Career ==
At the age of 11, França almost joined the youth academy of Portuguese top flight side Sporting from the youth academy of Estrela da Calheta in the Portuguese sixth division, where he was compared to Portugal international Cristiano Ronaldo. In 2017, he signed for Portuguese club Marítimo C. In 2019, França signed for Cape Umoya United in South Africa, where he made five appearances. On 2 November 2019, he debuted for Cape Umoya United during a 3–3 draw with Cape Town Spurs.
