= Edson Almeida =

Mozambican footballer

Personal information
- Full name: Edson da Cruz Almeida
- Date of birth: 28 January 1994 (age 32)
- Place of birth: Nampula, Mozambique
- Height: 1.86 m (6 ft 1 in)
- Position: Centre-back

Team information
- Current team: Ferroviário de Nampula
- Number: 18

Youth career
- –2012: AD Oeiras
- 2013: Olhanense

Senior career*
Years	Team	Apps	(Gls)
2013–2014	Liga Muçulmana		
2014–2015	União da Madeira	0	(0)
2015–2016	Liga Desportiva de Maputo		
2017–	Ferroviário de Nampula	19+	(1+)

International career
2015	Mozambique	1	(0)
- * Club domestic league appearances and goals as of 11 June 2020

Edson da Cruz Almeida (born 28 January 1994) is a Mozambican footballer who plays as a centre-back for Mozambican club Ferroviário de Nampula. He made one appearance for the Mozambique national team.

== Club career ==
On 28 December 2014, Almeida made his professional debut with União de Madeira as a late substitute in the 2014–15 Taça da Liga Third Round Group D match against Braga. Almeida also started the Group D matches against FC Porto and Rio Ave F.C.
