= Rui Norinho =

Portuguese footballer

Personal information
- Full name: Rui Miguel Norinho Coelho
- Date of birth: 13 June 1987 (age 39)
- Place of birth: Gondomar, Portugal
- Height: 1.71 m (5 ft 7 1/2 in)
- Position: Forward

Youth career
- 1996–2000: Gondomar
- 2000–2002: Porto
- 2002–2006: Gondomar

Senior career*
Years	Team	Apps	(Gls)
2006–2008	Gondomar	15	(2)
2008–2009	Young Boys II	27	(20)
2009–2010	Solothurn	11	(3)
2010–2012	Sousense	59	(12)
2014–2016	Sousense	26	(3)
Total		138	(40)
- * Club domestic league appearances and goals

Rui Miguel Norinho Coelho (born 13 June 1987), known as Norinho, is a Portuguese former footballer who played as a forward. He made 15 appearances in the Segunda Liga for Gondomar.
