= Ismael Lekbab =

Portuguese footballer

Personal information
- Full name: Ismael Costa Lekbab
- Date of birth: 8 May 1999 (age 27)
- Place of birth: Póvoa de Varzim, Portugal
- Height: 1.85 m (6 ft 1 in)
- Position: Goalkeeper

Team information
- Current team: Varzim
- Number: 1

Youth career
- 2009–2018: Varzim

Senior career*
Years	Team	Apps	(Gls)
2017–	Varzim B	37	(0)
2019–	Varzim	9	(0)
2022–2023	→ Merelinense (loan)	25	(0)
- * Club domestic league appearances and goals as of 11:58, 14 July 2023 (UTC)

Ismael Costa Lekbab (born 8 May 1999), also known as simply Ismael, is a Portuguese professional footballer who plays for Varzim S.C. as a goalkeeper.

== Club career ==
Lekbab was born to Moroccan parents in Póvoa de Varzim, and raised in the parish of Aver-o-Mar. He came through the ranks of his hometown club Varzim S.C. and made his senior debut with the reserve team in the Porto Football Association's first district league.

In May 2019, Lekbab was called up to the first team for the first time due to the suspension of Rafael Broetto, for the penultimate game of the LigaPro season away to C.D. Cova da Piedade on 12 May. He played the game ahead of Emanuel Novo and kept a clean sheet in a goalless draw for the relegation-threatened side. Manager César Peixoto kept him in goal for the crucial final game at home to Académica de Coimbra, where he was again unbeaten in a 1–0 win that kept the team up.

On 29 August 2019, Lekbab signed a new contract to last until the end of the 2021–22 season. In his final season, he was third choice behind Ricardo Nunes and Tiago Pereira as the team were relegated from the league, but he was preferred in the Taça de Portugal, where he starred in a penalty shootout win at home to Primeira Liga side C.S. Marítimo on 17 October 2021.

On 3 August 2022, Lekbab was loaned to Merelinense F.C. of the fourth-tier Campeonato de Portugal. The season-long deal included the right to recall in January.
