= Tiago Silva (footballer, born 1991) =

Portuguese footballer (born 1991)

Personal information
- Full name: José Tiago Nunes Silva
- Date of birth: 26 February 1991 (age 35)
- Place of birth: Caniçal, Portugal
- Height: 1.79 m (5 ft 10 1/2 in)
- Position: Right back

Team information
- Current team: Caniçal

Youth career
- 1999–2007: Caniçal
- 2007–2010: Marítimo

Senior career*
Years	Team	Apps	(Gls)
2010–2012	Caniçal	40	(3)
2012–2015	Marítimo B	74	(0)
2014	Marítimo	1	(0)
2015–2020	Caniçal	4	(0)
2020–	Machico	0	(0)
- * Club domestic league appearances and goals as of 29 November 2015

José Tiago Nunes Silva (born 26 February 1991 in Caniçal, Machico, Madeira) is a Portuguese professional footballer who plays for Machico as a right back.
