= Madeira Football Association =

Regional football governing body

The Madeira Football Association (Associação de Futebol da Madeira, abrv. AF Madeira) is the regional governing body for the all football competitions in the former Portuguese district of Funchal, including both Madeira Island and Porto Santo Island. It is also the regulator of the clubs registered in the autonomous region.

The association was founded as the Funchal Football Association (Associação de Futebol do Funchal) in 1916, before being renamed as the Madeira Football Association in 1996.

== Notable clubs affiliated to AF Madeira ==
Clubs featuring in national league competition for the 2024–25 season:

Liga Portugal (tier 1)

- Nacional

Liga Portugal 2 (tier 2)

- Marítimo

Campeonato de Portugal (tier 4)

- Camacha
- Marítimo B
- Machico

== Current Divisions: 2024–25 season ==
Locations of the Divisão de Honra teams

The AF Madeira runs the following divisions covering the fifth and sixth tiers of the Portuguese football league system.

=== Divisão de Honra ===
- 1º Maio Funchal
- Andorinha
- Câmara de Lobos
- Caniçal
- Cruzado Canicense
- Estrela da Calheta
- Nacional B
- Pontassolense
- Portosantense
- Ribeira Brava
- São Vicente
- Santacruzense

=== 1ª Divisão ===
- 1º Maio Funchal B
- Caniçal B
- Carvalheiro
- Choupana
- Estrela da Calheta B
- Juventude de Gaula
- Machico B
- Os Xavelhas
- Porto da Cruz
- São Vicente B
- Sporting da Madeira
- União da Bola

== Cup Competitions ==
=== Regional Championship ===
Year	Champions
1916–17	Marítimo
1917–18	Marítimo
1918–19	Not Held
1919–20	Not Held
1920–21	União da Madeira
1921–22	Marítimo
1922–23	Marítimo
1923–24	Marítimo
1924–25	Marítimo
1925–26	Marítimo
1926–27	Marítimo
1927–28	União da Madeira
1928–29	Marítimo
1929–30	Marítimo
1930–31	Marítimo
1931–32	União da Madeira
1932–33	Marítimo
1933–34	União da Madeira
1934–35	Nacional da Madeira
1935–36	Marítimo
1936–37	Nacional da Madeira
1937–38	União da Madeira
1938–39	Nacional da Madeira
1939–40	Marítimo
1940–41	Marítimo
1941–42	Nacional da Madeira
1942–43	Nacional da Madeira
1943–44	Nacional da Madeira
1944–45	Marítimo
1945–46	Marítimo
1946–47	Marítimo
1947–48	Marítimo
1948–49	Marítimo
1949–50	Marítimo
1950–51	Marítimo
1951–52	Marítimo
1952–53	Marítimo
1953–54	Marítimo
1954–55	Marítimo
1955–56	Marítimo
1956–57	União da Madeira
1957–58	Marítimo
1958–59	União da Madeira
1959–60	União da Madeira
1960–61	União da Madeira
1961–62	União da Madeira
1962–63	União da Madeira
1963–64	União da Madeira
1964–65	União da Madeira
1965–66	Marítimo
1966–67	Marítimo
1967–68	Marítimo
1968–69	Nacional da Madeira
1969–70	Marítimo
1970–71	Marítimo
1971–72	Marítimo
1972–73	Marítimo
1973–74	União da Madeira
1974–75	Nacional da Madeira
1975–76	Machico
1976–77	Santacruzense
1977–78	União da Madeira
1978–79	Santacruzense
1979–80	União da Madeira
1980–81	Portosantense
1981–82	Portosantense
1982–83	Santacruzense
1983–84	Portosantense
1984–85	Portosantense
1985–86	Portosantense
1986–87	Portosantense
1987–88	Portosantense
1988–89	Câmara de Lobos
1989–90	Machico
1990–91	Camacha
1991–92	São Vicente
1992–93	Ribeira Brava
1993–94	Santacruzense
1994–95	1º de Maio
1995–96	Santana
1996–97	Caniçal
1997–98	Ribeira Brava
1998–99	Pontassolense
1999–2000	Choupana
2000–01	Santana
2001–02	Santacruzense
2002–03	Santana
2003–04	Estrela da Calheta
2004–05	Caniçal
2005–06	Cruzado Canicense
2006–07	Cruzado Canicense
2007–08	Andorinha
2008–09	União da Madeira B
2009–10	Santacruzense
2010–11	Porto Moniz
2011–12	Os Xavelhas
2012–13	Câmara de Lobos
2013–14	Pontassolense
2014–15	Caniçal
2015–16	Caniçal
2016–17	Câmara de Lobos
2017–18	Pontassolense
2018–19	Câmara de Lobos
2019–20	Not Held
2020–21	Not Held
2021–22	Pontassolense
2022–23	Portosantense
2023–24	Machico
2024–25	Ribeira Brava

Titles

- Marítimo - 35
- União da Madeira - 16
- Nacional da Madeira - 8
- Portosantense - 8
- Pontassolense - 6
- Santacruzense - 6
- Caniçal - 4
- Câmara de Lobos - 3
- Machico - 3
- Ribeira Brava - 3
- Santana - 3
- Cruzado Canicense - 2
- 1º de Maio - 1
- Andorinha - 1
- Camacha - 1
- Choupana - 1
- Estrela da Calheta - 1
- Os Xavelhas - 1
- Porto Moniz - 1
- São Vicente - 1
- União da Madeira B - 1

=== Taça da Madeira ===
Year	Champions
1943–44	Nacional da Madeira
1944–45	Nacional da Madeira
1945–46	União da Madeira
1946–47	Marítimo
1947–48	Marítimo
1948–49	Not Held
1949–50	Marítimo
1950–51	Marítimo
1951–52	Marítimo
1952–53	Marítimo
1953–54	Marítimo
1954–55	Marítimo
1955–56	Marítimo
1956–57	União da Madeira
1957–58	União da Madeira
1958–59	Marítimo
1959–60	Marítimo
1960–61	União da Madeira
1961–62	União da Madeira
1962–63	União da Madeira
1963–64	União da Madeira
1964–65	União da Madeira
1965–66	Marítimo
1966–67	Marítimo
1967–68	Marítimo
1968–69	Marítimo
1969–70	Marítimo
1970–71	Marítimo
1971–72	Marítimo
1972–73	Machico
1973–74	Nacional da Madeira
1974–75	Nacional da Madeira
1975–76	Not held
1976–77	Not held
1977–78	Not held
1978–79	Marítimo
1979–80	Not Held
1980–81	Marítimo

Year	Champions
1981–82	Marítimo
1982–83	União da Madeira
1983–84	União da Madeira
1984–85	Marítimo
1985–86	Andorinha
1986–87	União da Madeira
1987–88	União da Madeira
1988–89	União da Madeira
1989–90	Camacha
1990–91	São Vicente
1991–92	Camacha
1992–93	União da Madeira
1993–94	Portosantense
1994–95	União da Madeira
1995–96	Câmara de Lobos
1996–97	Câmara de Lobos
1997–98	Marítimo
1998–99	Machico
1999–2000	Ribeira Brava
2000–01	Camacha
2001–02	Nacional da Madeira
2002–03	União da Madeira
2003–04	Camacha
2004–05	União da Madeira
2005–06	Portosantense
2006–07	Marítimo
2007–08	Nacional da Madeira
2008–09	Marítimo
2009–10	Portosantense
2010–11	Camacha
2011–12	Pontassolense
2012–13	Bairro da Argentina
2013–14	Câmara de Lobos
2014–15	Pontassolense
2015–16	Cruzado Canicense
2016–17	Câmara de Lobos
2017–18	Marítimo C
2019–2020	Final not played

Year	Champions
2020–21	Machico
2021–22	Caniçal
2022–23	Pontassolense

Titles

- Marítimo - 25
- União da Madeira - 17
- Nacional da Madeira - 6
- Camacha - 5
- Câmara de Lobos - 4
- Machico - 3
- Portosantense - 3
- Pontassolense - 3
- Marítimo C - 1
- Andorinha - 1
- Ribeira Brava - 1
- São Vicente - 1
- Bairro da Argentina - 1
- Cruzado Canicense - 1
- AD Porto da Cruz - 1
- Caniçal - 1

== See also ==
- Portuguese District Football Associations
- Portuguese football competitions
- List of football clubs in Portugal
