= A.D. Os Limianos =

Portuguese association football club

Limianos
- Full name: Associação Desportiva Os Limianos
- Founded: 1953
- Ground: Campo do Cruzeiro; Ponte de Lima, Portugal
- Capacity: 2,500
- Chairman: Domingos Vale
- Head Coach: Artur Jorge
- League: Campeonato de Portugal
- 2015–16: Relegation Group, Serie A, 4th
- Website: http://www.limianos.com/
Home colours	Away colours

Associação Desportiva Os Limianos (abbreviated as AD Os Limianos) is a Portuguese football club based in Ponte de Lima in the district of Viana do Castelo.

== Background ==
AD Os Limianos currently plays in the Segunda Divisão Série Norte, the third tier of Portuguese football. The club was founded in 1953 and they play their home matches at the Campo do Cruzeiro in Ponte de Lima. The stadium is able to accommodate 2,500 spectators.

The club is affiliated to Associação de Futebol de Viana do Castelo and has competed in the AF Viana do Castelo Taça. The club has also entered the Taça de Portugal on many occasions.

== Current squad ==
As of 16 November 2026

Note: Flags indicate national team as defined under FIFA eligibility rules; some limited exceptions apply. Players may hold more than one non-FIFA nationality.

No.	Pos.	Nation	Player
1	GK	POR	Ismael Lekbab
3	DF	POR	José Pimenta
4	DF	POR	Vini
5	DF	POR	Daniel Carvalho
7	MF	POR	Simão Jota
8	MF	POR	João Matos
9	FW	POR	Miguel Silva
10	FW	POR	Joel Marques
11	MF	POR	Edu Barros

No.	Pos.	Nation	Player
15	MF	POR	João Sousa
17	DF	POR	Hugo Ferreira
18	MF	POR	Martim Ferreira
19	FW	POR	Guilherme Alves
20	FW	GBS	Muelson Samate
22	DF	POR	Simão Lopes
23	DF	POR	David Castro
26	DF	POR	Marcos Brandão
33	DF	POR	Luís Pimenta
41	GK	POR	Rui Pedro
42	DF	POR	António Oliveira
77	FW	POR	Ferna
88	FW	POR	Tiago Barbosa
99	FW	POR	Miguel Morais

== Season to season ==
Season	Level	Division	Section	Place	Movements
1990–91	Tier 5	Distritais	AF Viana do Castelo – 1ª Divisão	4th	
1991–92	Tier 5	Distritais	AF Viana do Castelo – 1ª Divisão	1st	Promoted
1992–93	Tier 4	Terceira Divisão	Série A	6th	
1993–94	Tier 4	Terceira Divisão	Série A	1st	Promoted
1994–95	Tier 3	Segunda Divisão	Série Norte	6th	
1995–96	Tier 3	Segunda Divisão	Série Norte	17th	Relegated
1996–97	Tier 4	Terceira Divisão	Série A	16th	Relegated
1997–98	Tier 5	Distritais	AF Viana do Castelo – Honra	2nd	
1998–99	Tier 5	Distritais	AF Viana do Castelo – Honra	1st	Promoted
1999–2000	Tier 4	Terceira Divisão	Série A	10th	
2000–01	Tier 4	Terceira Divisão	Série A	6th	
2001–02	Tier 4	Terceira Divisão	Série A	17th	Relegated
2002–03	Tier 5	Distritais	AF Viana do Castelo – Honra	3rd	
2003–04	Tier 5	Distritais	AF Viana do Castelo – Honra	11th	
2004–05	Tier 5	Distritais	AF Viana do Castelo – Honra	4th	
2005–06	Tier 5	Distritais	AF Viana do Castelo – Honra	1st	Promoted
2006–07	Tier 4	Terceira Divisão	Série A	15th	Relegated
2007–08	Tier 5	Distritais	AF Viana do Castelo – Honra	1st	Promoted
2008–09	Tier 4	Terceira Divisão	Série A – 1ª Fase	6th	Promotion Group
	Tier 4	Terceira Divisão	Série A Fase Final	6th	
2009–10	Tier 4	Terceira Divisão	Série A – 1ª Fase	6th	Promotion Group
	Tier 4	Terceira Divisão	Série A Fase Final	6th	
2010–11	Tier 4	Terceira Divisão	Série A – 1ª Fase	1st	Promotion Group
	Tier 4	Terceira Divisão	Série A Fase Final	2nd	Promoted
2011–12	Tier 3	Segunda Divisão	Série Norte	5th	
2017–18	Tier 5	Distritais	AF Viana do Castelo – Honra	1st	Promoted

== Honours ==
- Portuguese Third Division: 1993/94
- AF Viana do Castelo Divisão de Honra: 1998/99, 2005/06, 2007/08
- AF Viana do Castelo 1ª Divisão: 1984/85, 1991/92
- AF Viana do Castelo Taça: 2007/08

== Notable former managers ==
- (Portugal) Rogério Gonçalves
