= A.D. Penamacorense =

Portuguese sports club

- Full name: Associação Desportiva Penamacorense
- Founded: 1978
- League: –
- 2010–11: 1st, I Divisão AF Castelo Branco

Associação Desportiva Penamacorense is a Portuguese sports club from Penamacor.

The men's football team had a stint on the old third tier, the Terceira Divisão, from 2006 to 2010. The team was also a Taça de Portugal regular during that time. Despite winning the I Divisão AF Castelo Branco in the 2010–11 season, no senior team was fielded after that.
