= Rebordosa A.C. =

Portuguese football club

Rebordosa
- Full name: Rebordosa Atlético Clube
- Founded: 20 May 1966; 59 years ago
- Ground: Estádio Manuel Moreira; Rebordosa, Paredes; Portugal
- Capacity: 9,000
- Chairman: Joaquim Barbosa
- League: Campeonato de Portugal
- 2021–22: Portuguese District Championships, promoted
Home colours

Rebordosa Atlético Clube (abbreviated as Rebordosa AC) is a Portuguese football club based in Rebordosa, Paredes in the district of Porto.

== Background ==
Rebordosa AC currently plays in the Campeonato de Portugal which is the fourth tier of Portuguese football. The club was founded in 1966 and they play their home matches at the Monte de Azevido in Rebordosa, Paredes. The stadium is able to accommodate 9,000 spectators.

The club is affiliated to Associação de Futebol do Porto and has competed in the AF Porto Taça. The club has also entered the national cup competition known, as Taça de Portugal on numerous occasions.

== Season to season ==
Season	Level	Division	Section	Place	Movements
1990–91	Tier 4	Terceira Divisão	Série B	10th	
1991–92	Tier 4	Terceira Divisão	Série B	6th	
1992–93	Tier 4	Terceira Divisão	Série B	4th	
1993–94	Tier 4	Terceira Divisão	Série B	4th	
1994–95	Tier 4	Terceira Divisão	Série B	7th	
1995–96	Tier 4	Terceira Divisão	Série B	12th	
1996–97	Tier 4	Terceira Divisão	Série B	16th	Relegated
1997–98	Tier 5	Distritais	AF Porto – Honra		
1998–99	Tier 5	Distritais	AF Porto – Honra	10th	
1999–2000	Tier 5	Distritais	AF Porto – Honra		Promoted
2000–01	Tier 4	Terceira Divisão	Série B	6th	
2001–02	Tier 4	Terceira Divisão	Série B	13th	
2002–03	Tier 4	Terceira Divisão	Série B	11th	
2003–04	Tier 4	Terceira Divisão	Série B	9th	
2004–05	Tier 4	Terceira Divisão	Série B	3rd	
2005–06	Tier 4	Terceira Divisão	Série B	7th	
2006–07	Tier 4	Terceira Divisão	Série B	6th	
2007–08	Tier 4	Terceira Divisão	Série B – 1ª Fase	8th	Relegation Group
	Tier 4	Terceira Divisão	Série B – Sub-Série B2	1st	
2008–09	Tier 4	Terceira Divisão	Série B – 1ª Fase	1st	Promotion Group
	Tier 4	Terceira Divisão	Série B Fase Final	4th	
2009–10	Tier 4	Terceira Divisão	Série B – 1ª Fase	9th	Relegation Group
	Tier 4	Terceira Divisão	Série B Últimos	1st	
2010–11	Tier 4	Terceira Divisão	Série B – 1ª Fase	8th	Relegation Group
	Tier 4	Terceira Divisão	Série B Últimos	1st	
2011–12	Tier 4	Terceira Divisão	Série B – 1ª Fase	6th	Promotion Group
	Tier 4	Terceira Divisão	Série B Fase Final	4th	
