= Estádio de São Miguel (Gondomar) =

Multi-use stadium in Gondomar, Portugal

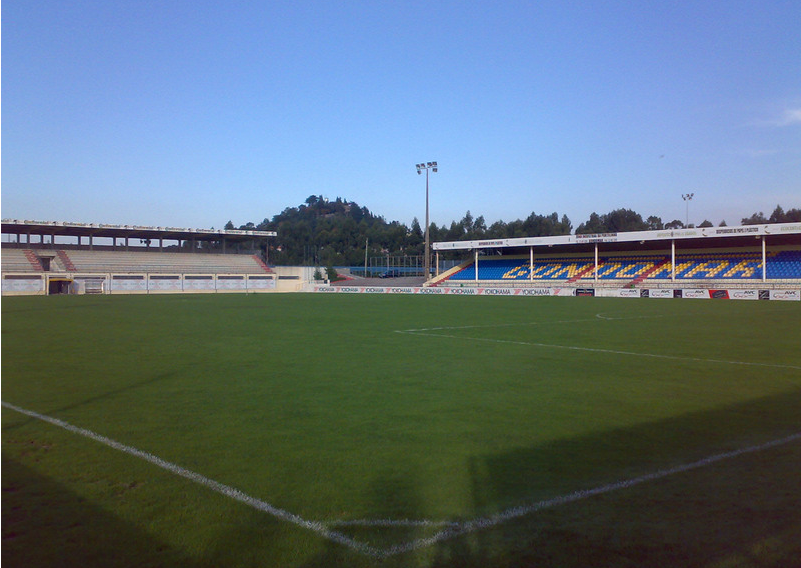
- Interactive map of Estádio de São Miguel
- Location: Gondomar, Portugal
- Coordinates: 41°08′09.44″N 8°32′30.33″W
- Owner: Gondomar S.C.
- Capacity: 2,450
- Surface: Grass
- Field size: 102 x 68 m

Construction
- Built: 1970; 56 years ago

Tenant
- Gondomar S.C.

Estádio de São Miguel is a multi-use stadium in Gondomar, Portugal. It is currently used mostly for football matches and is the home stadium of fourth-tier Gondomar SC. The stadium is able to hold around 2,450 people.
