= CD Candal =

Portuguese sports club

- Full name: Clube Desportivo Candal
- Founded: 1904
- Ground: Estádio Rei Ramiro, Vila Nova de Gaia
- Capacity: 3800
- League: Elite Série 1 AF Porto
- 2020–21: 9th

Clube Desportivo Candal is a Portuguese sports club from Candal, Vila Nova de Gaia.

== History ==
The men's football team played on the fourth tier in the 2009–10 and 2010–11 Terceira Divisão, and also played in the Taça de Portugal the same seasons.
