= AC Vila Meã =

Portuguese football club

Vila Meã
- Full name: Atlético Clube de Vila Meã
- Founded: 1944; 82 years ago
- Ground: Estádio Municipal de Vila Meã; Vila Meã, Amarante; Portugal
- Capacity: 2,950
- Chairman: José Matos
- League: Campeonato de Portugal
- 2021–22: 2nd, Serie D relegation group
Home colours

Atlético Clube de Vila Meã (abbreviated as AC Vila Meã) is a Portuguese football club based in Vila Meã, Amarante in the district of Porto.

AC Vila Meã currently plays in the Terceira Divisão Série B which is the fourth tier of the Portuguese football league system. The club was founded in 1944 and they play their home matches at the Estádio Municipal de Vila Meã in Vila Meã, Amarante. The stadium is able to accommodate 2,950 spectators.

The club is affiliated to Associação de Futebol do Porto and has competed in the AF Porto Taça. The club has also entered the national cup competition known as Taça de Portugal on occasions, reaching the fifth round in 2025–26.

== Season to season ==
| Season | Level | Division | Section | Place | Movements |
|---|---|---|---|---|---|
| 1990–91 | Tier 5 | Distritais | AF Porto – 1ª Divisão 2 | | |
| 1991–92 | Tier 5 | Distritais | AF Porto – 1ª Divisão 2 | | Relegated |
| 1992–93 | Tier 6 | Distritais | AF Porto – 1ª Divisão 2 | | Promoted |
| 1993–94 | Tier 5 | Distritais | AF Porto – Honra | | |
| 1994–95 | Tier 5 | Distritais | AF Porto – Honra | | Relegated |
| 1995–96 | Tier 6 | Distritais | AF Porto – 1ª Divisão 1 | | |
| 1996–97 | Tier 6 | Distritais | AF Porto – 1ª Divisão 1 | | Promoted |
| 1997–98 | Tier 5 | Distritais | AF Porto – Honra | | |
| 1998–99 | Tier 5 | Distritais | AF Porto – Honra | | Relegated |
| 1999–2000 | Tier 6 | Distritais | AF Porto – 1ª Divisão A | | |
| 2000–01 | Tier 6 | Distritais | AF Porto – 1ª Divisão A | | |
| 2001–02 | Tier 6 | Distritais | AF Porto – 1ª Divisão A | | |
| 2002–03 | Tier 6 | Distritais | AF Porto – 1ª Divisão 2 | | Promoted |
| 2003–04 | Tier 5 | Distritais | AF Porto – Honra | 13th | |
| 2004–05 | Tier 5 | Distritais | AF Porto – Honra | 1st | Promoted |
| 2005–06 | Tier 4 | Terceira Divisão | Série B | 1st | Promoted |
| 2006–07 | Tier 3 | Segunda Divisão | Serie A | 5th | |
| 2007–08 | Tier 3 | Segunda Divisão | Série B – 1ª Fase | 9th | |
| | Tier 3 | Segunda Divisão | Série B – Sub-Série B1 | 2nd | Relegated |
| 2008–09 | Tier 4 | Terceira Divisão | Série B – 1ª Fase | 5th | Promotion Group |
| | Tier 4 | Terceira Divisão | Série B Fase Final | 6th | |
| 2009–10 | Tier 4 | Terceira Divisão | Série B – 1ª Fase | 6th | Promotion Group |
| | Tier 4 | Terceira Divisão | Série B Fase Final | 4th | |
| 2010–11 | Tier 4 | Terceira Divisão | Série B – 1ª Fase | 10th | Relegation Group |
| | Tier 4 | Terceira Divisão | Série B Últimos | 3rd | |
| 2011–12 | Tier 4 | Terceira Divisão | Série B – 1ª Fase | 8th | Relegation Group |
| | Tier 4 | Terceira Divisão | Série B Últimos | 2nd | |

== Honours ==
- Terceira Divisão: 2005/06
- AF Porto Divisão de Honra: 2004/05

== Notable former managers ==
- (Brazil) Aloísio Pires Alves
- (Portugal) Eduardo Luís
- (Portugal) Vítor Paneira
