= CF Andorinha =

Portuguese football club

Andorinha
- Full name: Clube de Futebol Andorinha de Santo António
- Nickname: Swallows
- Founded: 6 May 1925; 101 years ago
- Ground: Estádio do Andorinha; Santo António, Funchal
- Capacity: 500
- Chairman: Duarte Santos
- Head coach: Fernando Pita
- League: AF Madeira's Divisão de Honra
- 2024–25: 4th
- Website: cfandorinha.pt
Home colours	Away colours

Clube de Futebol Andorinha de Santo António (abbreviated as CF Andorinha) is a Portuguese football club based in Santo António, Funchal, on the island of Madeira. They compete in the AF Madeira's Divisão de Honra, the fifth tier of Portugal football. The name andorinha (swallow in English) came about following a shot by a team player that followed the trajectory of one of these birds.

== Background ==
CF Andorinha currently plays in the AF Madeira's Divisão de Honra which is the sixth tier of Portuguese Football. The club was founded on 6 May 1925, and they play their home matches at the Estádio Do Andorinha in Santo António, Funchal. The stadium is able to accommodate 500 spectators. It is a small stadium with a synthetic playing surface and seating for 400 people. The ground is located in the northern area of Funchal's Santo António freguesia, on the outskirts of the city. It is in very close proximity to C.S. Marítimo's training complex and Andorinha's ground is in fact often used to stage matches for Marítimo's youth teams.

Up until the end of the 2008–09 season CF Andorinha only played Distritais (Tier 5) football on Madeira but following league restructuring the 1ª Divisão clubs of the AF Madeira became part of the Terceira Divisão (Third Division) in 2009–10. After finishing second at the end of the First Phase, Andorinha won the Promotion Group and gained promotion to Segunda Divisão Série Norte for 2010–11 with the manager/coach Nelson Calaça e Duarte Santos. While their first season in the Second Division proved short with relegation at the end of the season, it was a tremendous achievement for the club to be competing against mainland clubs for the first time at the Portuguese third tier level.

The club is considered youth training and has had many young promising players play for them, including Cristiano Ronaldo. They had a partnership with FC Porto Dragon Force schools from 2012 to 2014 with the manager Nelson Rosado's leadership. The club is also affiliated to Associação de Futebol da Madeira and has competed in the AF Madeira Taça. The club has also entered the national cup competition known as Taça de Portugal on a few occasions.

== Season to season ==
Season	Level	Division	League	Finish	Movements
1990–91	Tier 5	Distritais	AF Madeira – 1ª Divisão		
1991–92	Tier 5	Distritais	AF Madeira – 1ª Divisão		
1992–93	Tier 5	Distritais	AF Madeira – 1ª Divisão		
1993–94	Tier 5	Distritais	AF Madeira – 1ª Divisão		
1994–95	Tier 5	Distritais	AF Madeira – 1ª Divisão		
1995–96	Tier 5	Distritais	AF Madeira – 1ª Divisão		
1996–97	Tier 5	Distritais	AF Madeira – 1ª Divisão		
1997–98	Tier 5	Distritais	AF Madeira – 1ª Divisão		
1998–99	Tier 5	Distritais	AF Madeira – 1ª Divisão	8th	
1999–2000	Tier 5	Distritais	AF Madeira – 1ª Divisão		
2000–01	Tier 5	Distritais	AF Madeira – 1ª Divisão		
2001–02	Tier 5	Distritais	AF Madeira – 1ª Divisão		
2002–03	Tier 5	Distritais	AF Madeira – 1ª Divisão		
2003–04	Tier 5	Distritais	AF Madeira – 1ª Divisão		Relegated
2004–05	Tier 6	Distritais	AF Madeira – 2ª Divisão		Promoted
2005–06	Tier 5	Distritais	AF Madeira – 1ª Divisão		
2006–07	Tier 5	Distritais	AF Madeira – 1ª Divisão		
2007–08	Tier 5	Distritais	AF Madeira – 1ª Divisão	1st	
2008–09	Tier 5	Distritais	AF Madeira – 1ª Divisão	6th	Re-structuring
2009–10	Tier 4	Terceira Divisão	Série Madeira – 1ª Fase	2nd	Promotion Group
2009–10	Tier 4	Terceira Divisão	Série Madeira Primeiros	1st	Promoted
2010–11	Tier 3	Segunda Divisão	Série Norte	14th	Relegated
2011–12	Tier 4	Terceira Divisão	Série Madeira – 1ª Fase	9th	Relegation Group
2011–12	Tier 4	Terceira Divisão	Série Madeira Últimos	3rd	
2023–24	Tier 5	Distritais	AF Madeira – Divisão de Honra	9th	
2024–25	Tier 5	Distritais	AF Madeira – Divisão de Honra	4th	

== Players ==
=== Current squad ===
As of 17 July 2025

Note: Flags indicate national team as defined under FIFA eligibility rules; some limited exceptions apply. Players may hold more than one non-FIFA nationality.

No.	Pos.	Nation	Player
1	GK	POR	Paulo Mendes
3	DF	POR	Dylan Pinto
4	DF	POR	Luís Vieira
8	MF	POR	Kiko
6	DF	POR	Lucas Faria
7	FW	POR	Miguel Brito
9	FW	POR	Evandro Faria
10	MF	POR	Márcio Teles (captain)
11	FW	POR	Tiago Caires
14	DF	POR	Rodrigo Sousa
15	MF	VEN	Alejandro Figueira
18	FW	POR	Gonçalo Caminata

No.	Pos.	Nation	Player
—	GK	POR	Carin Gonçalves
—	GK	POR	Vitor Pereira
—	DF	POR	Bernado Nóbrega
—	DF	POR	Guilherme Silva
—	DF	POR	Tiago Silva
—	MF	POR	Mateus Neri
—	MF	POR	Tiaguinho
—	FW	POR	Piruka
—	FW	POR	Pedro Silva
—	FW	POR	César Pontes
—	MF	POR	Rodrigo Abreu
—	MF	POR	Igor Sá

== Notable players ==
- (Portugal) Cristiano Ronaldo (youth)

== Coaching staff ==
Position	Staff
Head coach	(Portugal) Fernando Pita
Assistant head coach	(Portugal) Malásia (Portugal) João Tomás

== Honours ==
- Terceira Divisão – Serie Madeira: 1
  - 2009–10
- AF Madeira Championship: 1
  - 2007–08
- AF Madeira Cup: 1
  - 1985–86
