= C.D. Portosantense =

Portuguese football club

Portosantense
- Full name: Clube Desportivo Portosantense
- Founded: 1948
- Ground: José Lino Pestana, Madeira
- Capacity: 2,500
- Chairman: Alex Bunbury
- Manager: Robert Silva
- League: AF Madeira Divisão de Honra (5th tier)
- 2023–24: 12th, Campeonato de Portugal, Serie A

Clube Desportivo Portosantense, commonly known as Portosantense, is a Portuguese football club based in Porto Santo, Madeira. Founded in 1948, it currently plays in the AF Madeira Divisão de Honra (5th tier) and hosts its home matches at the 2,500-seat Estádio José Lino Pestana.

Portosantense first reached the third division in 2004 and remained there for four years. In the 2007–08 season, the club finished 10th, missing the 6th-place finish required to guarantee a spot in the promotion play-offs; it was later relegated back to the fourth level due to administrative irregularities.

In April 2024, former Canadian national team star Alex Bunbury became the club's president after leading an investment group to purchase a 90% ownership stake. Bunbury has stated his ambition to develop a new stadium and guide the team to the second division within five years.

== Former players ==
- Wesley John – Saint Vincent and the Grenadines international who played in Portugal for 23 years, including for clubs like Ribeira Brava and Porto da Cruz, which both played below the Portuguese fourth tier.
