= C.F. Caniçal =

Portuguese association football club

- Full name: Clube de Futebol Caniçal
- Founded: 1981
- Ground: Campo de Futebol do Caniçal, Machico
- Capacity: 1000
- Chairman: (Portugal) Emanuel Moniz Melim
- Manager: (Portugal) Luís Cunha
- League: Campeonato de Portugal
- 2015–16: Madeira FA First Division, 1st (promoted)
| Home colours | Away colours |

Clube de Futebol Caniçal also known as CF Caniçal is a Portuguese football club from Machico, Madeira and founded in 1981. CF Caniçal currently plays in the Campeonato de Portugal. They currently play their home games at Campo de Futebol do Caniçal in Machico, Madeira with a capacity of 1000. Their current chairman is Emanuel Moniz Melim and the current manager is Bizarro.

== Honours ==
- Terceira Divisão – Serie E: 1
  - 2006–07
- AF Madeira Championship: 2
  - 1996–97, 2004–05

== Current squad ==
As of 4 April 2017

Note: Flags indicate national team as defined under FIFA eligibility rules; some limited exceptions apply. Players may hold more than one non-FIFA nationality.

| No. | Pos. | Nation | Player |
|---|---|---|---|
| — | GK | POR | André Berenguer |
| — | GK | POR | Rafael |
| — | GK | POR | Nélson Sousa |
| — | GK | POR | Carlos Lima |
| — | GK | POR | Duarte Betencourt |
| — | DF | POR | Zé Pedro |
| — | DF | POR | Tiago Silva |
| — | DF | POR | Hélder Moreira |
| — | DF | POR | Cláudio Teixeira |
| — | DF | POR | Celsinho |
| — | DF | POR | André Malásia |
| — | DF | POR | Carlos Filipe |
| — | MF | POR | Cláudio Jesus |

| No. | Pos. | Nation | Player |
|---|---|---|---|
| — | MF | POR | Quaresma |
| — | MF | POR | João Saldanha |
| — | MF | POR | João Prietos |
| — | MF | POR | João Domingos |
| — | MF | POR | Alexandre |
| — | MF | POR | Filipe Sousa |
| — | MF | POR | Carlos Manuel |
| — | FW | POR | Alexandre Perestrelo |
| — | FW | POR | Pedro Moutinho |
| — | FW | POR | Caninha |
| — | FW | POR | João Santos |
| — | FW | POR | Evandro Faria |
