= A.D. Pontassolense =

Portuguese football club

Pontassolense
- Full name: Associação Desportiva Pontassolense
- Founded: 1979
- Ground: Ponta do Sol, Ponta do Sol, Madeira
- Capacity: 3,000
- Chairman: (Portugal) Orlando Sousa
- Manager: (Portugal) Arsénio Miranda
- League: Madeira Divisão Honra
- 2019–20: Madeira Divisão Honra, 2nd
Home colours	Away colours

Associação Desportiva Pontassolense is a Portuguese football club based in Ponta do Sol, Madeira. Founded in 1979, it currently plays in the Madeira Football Association, holding home matches at Campo Municipal Ponta do Sol, with a 3,000-seat capacity.

== History ==
Pontassolense saw the light of day on 27 January 1979, but only began participating in official competitions two years later.

In the early years the club was based in Ribeira Brava, Madeira Islands, where one single midweek practice took place. The remaining sessions occurred at Ponta do Sol, which would later become a hotel.

== Honours ==
- Terceira Divisão – Serie Madeira: 1
  - 2011–12
- AF Madeira Championship: 3
  - 1998–99
  - 2013–14
  - 2017–18
- AF Madeira Cup: 1
  - 2011–12
