= Porto Football Association =

- Founded: 10 August 1912
- Country: Portugal
- Confederation: UEFA
- Number of clubs: 134; 36 (Division of Elite); 32 (Division of Honour); 32 (First Division); 34 (Second Division)
- Level on pyramid: 4, 5, 6, 7
- Promotion to: Campeonato de Portugal
- Domestic cup(s): Taça de Portugal; Taça AF Porto
- Website: www.afporto.pt

The Porto Football Association (Portuguese: Associação de Futebol do Porto; abbreviated as AF Porto) is the district governing body for all football and futsal competitions in the Portuguese district of Porto. It is also the regulator of the clubs registered in the district.

It was officially founded on 10 August 1912 by the initiative of F.C. Porto and Leixões S.C., who were immediately joined by many other clubs, including some from outside districts. Today it is the largest football district association in the country with 340 clubs and 19.796 athletes in all age categories, 750 referees and organises around games 12.800 per season.

Below the Campeonato de Portugal (Portuguese third level) the competitions are organised at a district level (known in Portuguese as Distritais) with each District Association organising its competitions according to geographical and other factors. AF Porto runs a league competition with four divisions, at the fourth, fifth, sixth and seventh levels of the Portuguese football league system and a cup competition known as Taça AF Porto (since 2013–14). Taça AF Porto winners and Elite Division runner-ups earn a spot in the following season's Taça de Portugal.

== Porto FA clubs in national leagues (2020–21) ==
Currently there are 17 Porto FA clubs playing in the national leagues (first, second and third levels of the Portuguese football league system. Aves, Boavista, Leça, Leixões, Paços de Ferreira, Penafiel, Porto, Rio Ave, Salgueiros, Tirsense, Trofense, Varzim, the forerunners to Felgueiras and the defunct Académico do Porto have competed in Primeira Liga, which at 14 clubs is the highest total for a District Association.

=== Primeira Liga ===
- Boavista F.C.
- F.C. Porto
- Rio Ave F.C.

=== LigaPro ===
- F.C. Paços de Ferreira
- C.D. Aves
- F.C. Penafiel
- F.C. Porto B
- Leixões S.C.
- Varzim S.C.

=== Campeonato de Portugal ===
- A.R. São Martinho
- Amarante F.C.
- C.D. Trofense
- F.C. Felgueiras 1932
- F.C. Pedras Rubras
- Gondomar S.C.
- Leça F.C.
- S.C. Coimbrões
- U.S.C. Paredes
- C.F. Canelas 2010
- Valadares Gaia F.C.
- F.C. Tirsense
- S.C. Salgueiros

== Current Championships (2020–21) ==
The AF Porto runs the following divisions:

- Elite Division (tier 4)
- Honour Division (tier 5)
- First Division (tier 6)
- Second Division (tier 7)

== List of champions ==
Club won the Porto Championship

Season	Elite Division	Honour Division	First Division	Second Division	Third Division	Porto FA Cup	Porto FA Supercup
Porto Championship (1913–1947)
1913–14			Boavista				
1914–15			Porto				
1915–16			Porto (2)			Porto	
1916–17			Porto (3)			Porto (2)	
1917–18			Salgueiros			Espinho (Note: Espinho is a club from the Aveiro District but its football association was only created in 1924.)	
1918–19			Porto (4)				
1919–20			Porto (5)				
1920–21			Porto (6)				
1921–22			Porto (7)	Salgueiros			
1922–23			Porto (8)	Espinho			
1923–24			Porto (9)	Sport Progresso			
1924–25			Porto (10)				
1925–26			Porto (11)	Coimbrões			
1926–27			Porto (12)				
1927–28			Porto (13)				
1928–29			Porto (14)	Ramaldense			
1929–30			Porto (15)	Candal			
1930–31			Porto (16)	Boavista			
1931–32			Porto (17)				
1932–33			Porto (18)				
1933–34			Porto (19)				
1934–35			Porto (20)				
1935–36			Porto (21)				
1936–37			Porto (22)				
1937–38			Porto (23)	Candal (2)			
1938–39			Porto (24)	Ramaldense (2)			
1939–40			Leixões	Ramaldense (3)	Infesta		
1940–41			Porto (25)	Candal (3)	Paredes		
1941–42			Académico do Porto	Ramaldense (4)	Freamunde		
1942–43			Porto (26)	Vilanovense	Rio Ave		
1943–44			Porto (27)	Ramaldense (5)			
1944–45			Porto (28)				
1945–46			Porto (29)	Académico do Porto	Pedrouços		
1946–47			Porto (30)	Ermesinde	Tirsense		
Regional championships (1947–Present)
1947–48				Tirsense	Portugal de Bonfim		
1948–49			Tirsense	Infesta	Perosinho		
1949–50			Salgueiros (2)	Varzim	Valonguense		
1950–51			Tirsense (2)	Ramaldense (6)	S. Felix da Marinha		
1951–52			Leixões (2)	Vilanovense (2)	Rio Ave (2)		
1952–53			Salgueiros (2)	Académico do Porto (2)	Amarante		
1953–54			Académico do Porto (2)	Vilanovense (2)	Marco		
1954–55			Rio Ave	Pedrouços	Penafiel		
1955–56			Avintes	Varzim (2)	Lixa		
1956–57			Académico do Porto (3)	Penafiel	Infesta (2)		
1957–58			Académico do Porto (4)	Paredes	Candal	Porto (3)	
1958–59	No competitions held.						
1959–60			Varzim		S. Pedro da Cova	Porto (4)	
1960–61			Varzim (2)		Pedrouços (2)	Porto (5)	
1961–62			Varzim (3)	Coimbrões (2)	Valonguense (2)	Porto (6)	
1962–63			Tirsense (2)	Aves	Perosinho (2)	Porto (7)	
1963–64			Penafiel	Amarante	Candal (2)	Porto (8)	
1964–65			Vilanovense	Candal (4)	Gondomar	Porto (9)	
1965–66			Tirsense (3)	Felgueiras	Trofense	Porto (10)	
1966–67			Avintes (2)	Serzedo	Grijó	Rio Ave	
1967–68			Boavista (2)	Paços de Ferreira	Canidelo	Vilanovense	
1968–69			Avintes (3)	Aliados Lordelo	Foz		
1969–70			Freamunde	Coimbrões (3)	Perafita		
1970–71			Vilanovense (2)	Perosinho	Crestuma		
1971–72			Avintes (4)	Pedras Rubras	Sporting Cruz		
1972–73			Paços de Ferreira	Valadares	Pedrouços (3)		
1973–74			Paredes	Valonguense	Infesta (3)		
1974–75			Aliados Lordelo	Lixa	Rio Tinto		
1975–76			Leverense	Crestuma	Nun'Álvares		
1976–77			Amarante	Coimbrões (4)	Gens	Salgueiros	
1977–78			Leça	Trofense	Aparecida		
1978–79			Valadares	Custóias	Marítimo Angeiras		
1979–80			Lixa	Castêlo da Maia	Senhora da Hora	Salgueiros (2)	
1980–81			Marco	Sport Progresso (2)	Padroense	Porto (11)	
1981–82			Felgueiras	Oliveira do Douro	Alfenense	Penafiel	
1982–83			Freamunde (2)	Arcozelo	Roriz	Leixões	
1983–84			Infesta	Pedras Rubras (2)	Os Lusitanos	Porto (12)	
1984–85			Lousada	Aliados Lordelo (2)	Sporting Cruz (2)	Felgueiras	
1985–86			Pedrouços	Dragões Sandinenses	Aliança de Gandra		
1986–87			Dragões Sandinenses	Nogueirense	Ramaldense		
1987–88			Vilanovense (3)	Ramaldense (6)	Gatões		
1988–89			Rio Tinto	Perafita	Covêlo		
1989–90			S. Martinho	Gondomar	Salvadorense		
1990–91			Avintes (5)	Caíde Rei	Custóias		
1991–92			Oliveira do Douro	Campo	Pasteleira		
1992–93		Vilanovense	Senhora da Hora	Gatões	Lomba	Lomba	
1993–94		Senhora da Hora	Desportivo Vilar	Pasteleira	Gulpilhares	S. Pedro Rates	
1994–95		Valonguense	S. Martinho (2)	Mindelo			
1995–96		Canelas	Leverense (2)	Regilde			
1996–97		Ermesinde	Sport Progresso	Vilarinho			
1997–98		Avintes	S. Martinho (3)	Arcozelo (2)			
1998–99		Pedras Rubras	Lomba	Campo (2)			
1999–2000		Tirsense	Coimbrões / Estrelas de Fânzeres	Pasteleira (2)			
2000–01		Valonguense (2)	Perosinho	Bougadense			
2001–02		Lixa	Bougadense	Canidelo			
2002–03		Nogueirense	Sobrado	S. Pedro Rates			
2003–04		Valonguense (3)	Oliveira do Douro (2)	Leça do Balio			
2004–05		Vila Meã	Candal	Folgosa da Maia			
2005–06		Amarante	Canidelo	Serzedo (2)			
2006–07		Padroense	Várzea Douro	Lavrense			
2007–08		Coimbrões	Grijó	Zezerense			
2008–09		Pedrouços	Sport Progresso (2)	Salgueiros (2)			
2009–10		Sousense	Custóias (2)	Foz			
2010–11		Infesta	Dragões Sandinenses (2)	Not attributed. (Note: The Second Division championship final between F.C. Cerco do Porto and Aliança F.C. de Gandra was nullified due fans invading the pitch in the first leg.)			
2011–12		Felgueiras 1932	Perafita	Valadares Gaia			
2012–13		Lixa (2)	Maia Lidador	Canelas 2010			
2013–14	Sobrado	Valadares Gaia	Vilarinho	Ermesinde 1936		Serzedo	
2014–15	S. Martinho	Baião	Ermesinde 1936	Aparecida		Oliveira do Douro	
2015–16	Aliança de Gandra	Canelas 2010	Leça do Balio	Lousada		Barrosas	Barrosas
2016–17	Canelas 2010	Ermesinde 1936	Pedroso	Salvadorense		Canelas 2010	
2017–18	Leça	Foz / Gondomar B	Marco 09 / Rio Tinto (2)	Inter Milheirós		Rio Tinto	
2018–19	Canelas 2010 (2)	Nogueirense (2)	Lousada B	Ferreira		Vilarinho	

Source: www.afporto.pt

== All-time Primeira Liga table ==
These are the most successful Porto FA clubs in the history of Primeira Liga (as of the 2022–23 season):

Pos	Team	S	Pts	GP	W	D	L	GF	GA	GD	1st	2nd	3rd	4th	5th	6th	T	Debut	Since/ Last App	Best	
1	Porto	89	5570	2534	1705	455	380	5627	2222	3405	30	29	13	11	3	1	87	1934–35	1934–35	1	^{[A]}
2	Boavista	60	2550	1840	693	471	676	2385	2536	-151	1	3	2	10	4	5	25	1935–36	2014–15	1	
3	Rio Ave	28	1091	908	278	257	373	951	1191	-240	–	–	–	–	3	2	5	1979–80	2022–23	5	
4	Paços de Ferreira	24	923	784	234	221	329	839	1106	-267	–	–	1	–	1	2	4	1990–91	2022–23	3	
5	Salgueiros	24	774	740	197	183	360	804	1377	-573	–	–	–	–	1	1	2	1943–44	2001–02	5	
6	Leixões	25	713	670	183	164	323	750	1186	-436	–	–	–	–	1	1	2	1936–37	2009–10	5	
7	Varzim	21	683	618	169	176	273	638	913	-275	–	–	–	–	1	1	2	1963–64	2002–03	5	
8	Penafiel	14	435	434	106	117	211	351	625	-274	–	–	–	–	–	–	–	1980–81	2014–15	10	
9	Tirsense	8	268	256	65	73	118	219	370	-151	–	–	–	–	–	–	–	1967–68	1995–96	8	
10	Desportivo das Aves	6	160	196	40	40	116	173	320	-147	–	–	–	–	–	–	–	1985–86	2019–20	13	
11	Leça	4	124	124	33	25	66	120	231	-111	–	–	–	–	–	–	–	1941–42	1997–98	12	
12	Académico do Porto	5	60	82	18	6	58	137	300	-163	–	–	–	–	–	–	–	1934–35	1941–42	7	^{[B]}
13	Felgueiras	1	33	34	8	9	17	29	47	-18	–	–	–	–	–	–	–	1995–96	1995–96	16	^{[C]}
14	Trofense	1	23	30	5	8	17	25	42	-17	–	–	–	–	–	–	–	2008–09	2008–09	16	

A. Never relegated.
B. Club ended football team in 1964.
C. Club folded in 2005. Successor club Felgueiras 1932 was founded in 2006.

Primeira Liga
Liga Portugal 2
Liga 3
Campeonato de Portugal
Portuguese District Championships
Clubs no longer in competition

== See also ==
- Portuguese District Football Associations
- Portuguese football competitions
- List of football clubs in Portugal
