= U.D. Gândara =

Portuguese sports club

- Full name: União Desportiva da Gândara
- Founded: 1978
- Dissolved: 2013
- Ground: Figueira da Foz

União Desportiva da Gândara is a Portuguese sports club from Moinhos da Gândara, Figueira da Foz.

The men's football team played in the I league of AF Coimbra, but after winning that league in 2012–13, no team was fielded again. The team previously played on the Terceira Divisão, the Portuguese fourth tier, as late as 2006 to 2011. They also contested the Taça de Portugal during these years.
