= Gondomar S.C. =

Portuguese association football club

Gondomar
- Full name: Gondomar Sport Clube
- Founded: 1 May 1921
- Ground: Estádio São Miguel, Gondomar, Portugal
- Capacity: 2,450
- Chairman: Álvaro Cerqueira
- Manager: Americo Soares
- League: Liga Portugal 2
- 2025–26: AF Porto Liga Pro, 6th
- Website: www.gondomarsc.pt
Home colours

Gondomar Sport Club is a Portuguese football club based in Gondomar, Porto District. Founded on 1 May 1921, it currently plays in the fourth-tier Campeonato de Portugal, holding home games at Estádio de São Miguel, with a capacity of 2.450 spectators.

== History ==
Gondomar's early foundations were established on 1 August 1928, as the club registered in the Porto Football Association. In 1932, however, it ceased all activity, until a group of people dubbed Os Teimosos de Gondomar (Stubborn), ten years later, took it upon themselves to resurrect the club, which return to organized football in 1960, in the third regional division; promotion to the second regional level was achieved five years later.

In 1970, Gondomar moved to the new Estádio de São Miguel. On 27 October 1986, the team participated for the first time in the Portuguese Cup, losing 1–2 at F.C. Marco. In 2003, whilst competing in the third division, it made nationwide headlines after eliminating Benfica in the fourth round, with a 1–0 win at the Estádio da Luz.

One year later, Gondomar reached the second level for the first time in its history. In the 2006–07 season, the club achieved its best-ever classification in the category, finishing fifth.

In 2009, after ranking 16th and last, Gondomar returned to the third level.

Liverpool FC footballer Diogo Jota and his brother André Silva both started their careers at Gondomar. In August 2025 the club announced that their image would be incorporated into the clubs new home shirt as a tribute to them following their deaths in a car accident.

== League and cup history ==
Season	I	II	III	IV	V	Pts.	Pl.	W	L	T	GS	GA	Diff.
1994–95				12		32 pts	34	10	12	12	35	35	0
1995–96				2		63 pts	34	19	6	9	68	25	+43
1997–98			8			48 pts	34	14	6	14	50	53	−3
1998–99			18			30 pts	34	7	9	18	32	53	−21
2003–04			1			86 pts	36	27	5	4	69	25	+44
2004–05		16				39 pts	34	11	6	17	38	45	−7
2005–06		6				51 pts	34	14	9	11	56	41	+15
2006–07		5				45 pts	30	13	6	11	33	30	+3
2007–08		12				35 pts	30	9	8	13	31	51	−20
2008–09		16				30 pts	30	7	9	14	29	35	−6
2009–10			4			...	...	...	...	...	...	...	...

== Honours ==
- Third Division: 2003–04

== Managers ==
- (Portugal) Fernando Pires

== Stadium ==
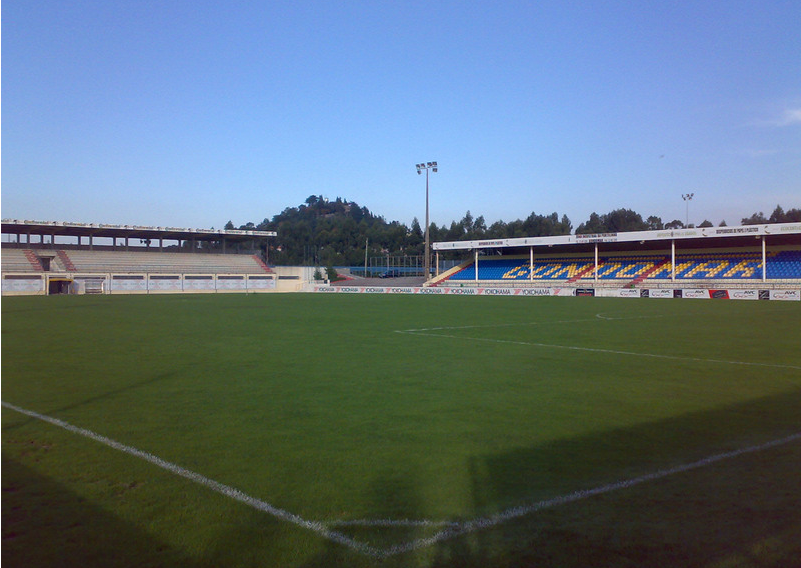
A view of Estádio de São Miguel.

== See also ==
- Apito Dourado
