= Estrela da Calheta F.C. =

Portuguese football club

Estrela da Calheta
- Full name: Estrela da Calheta Futebol Clube
- Founded: 1964
- Ground: Campo Municipal dos Prazeres, Calheta, Madeira
- Capacity: 800
- Chairman: Antero Santana
- League: AF Madeira First Division
- 2012–13: 6th, AF Madeira First Division
- Website: http://www.estreladacalheta.pt.to/

Estrela da Calheta Futebol Clube, commonly known as Estrela da Calheta is a Portuguese football club from Calheta, Madeira. Founded in 1964, the club currently plays at the Campo Municipal dos Prazeres which holds a capacity of 800.

== Honours ==
- AF Madeira First Division
  - Winners (1): 2003–04
- AF Madeira Second Division
  - Winners (1): 2007–08
