= Padroense F.C. =

Portuguese football club

Padroense
- Full name: Padroense Futebol Clube
- Founded: 1922; 103 years ago
- Ground: Estádio do Padroense FC, Padrão da Légua – Matosinhos
- Capacity: 3,000
- Chairman: (Portugal) Germano Pinho
- Manager: (Portugal) Augusto Mata
- League: Portuguese Second Division
- 2011–12: Zona Centro, 11th

Padroense Futebol Clube is a Portuguese football club that competes in the Portuguese Second Division. They were founded in 1922.
