= GD Alcochetense =

Portuguese football club

- Full name: Grupo Desportivo Alcochetense
- Founded: 1 January 1937; 89 years ago
- Ground: Estádio António Almeida Correia; Alcochete
- Capacity: 5,000
- Owner: Filipe Morais
- League: I AF Setúbal
- 2019–20: I AF Setúbal, 4th
- Website: http://www.omeuclube.org/gafetense/

Grupo Desportivo Alcochetense is a Portuguese football club located in Alcochete, Portugal. Alcochetense was founded on 1 January 1937, by local football supporters.

On 25 September 2026, the club was bought by former footballer Filipe Morais.

== Colours and badge ==
Alcochetense's colours are green and white, inspired by Sporting CP.
