= C.S.D. Câmara de Lobos =

Portuguese association football club

Câmara de Lobos
- Full name: Centro Social e Desportivo de Câmara de Lobos
- Nickname: Câmara-Lobenses
- Founded: 28 September 1977; 48 years ago
- Ground: Municipal, Câmara de Lobos
- Capacity: 5,000
- President: Higino Teles
- Manager: Nando Teixeira
- League: AF Madeira Divisão de Honra
- 2021–22: Campeonato de Portugal – Serie A, 10th of 11 (relegated)
- Website: https://csdcamaradelobos.com/
Home colours	Away colours

Centro Social e Desportivo de Câmara de Lobos is a Portuguese sports club, best known for its association football section, founded in Câmara de Lobos in 1977.

== History ==
Founded on 28 September 1977, Câmara de Lobos' origins trace back to 1967, when a group of people had the willingness to create a football club.

== Honours ==
- AF Madeira Divisão de Honra: 2012–13, 2016–17, 2018–19
- AF Madeira Primeira Divisão: 1988–89
