= AD Oeiras =

Portuguese football club

- Full name: Associação Desportiva de Oeiras
- Founded: 22 December 1906; 119 years ago
- Ground: Estádio Municipal Mário Wilson; Oeiras
- Capacity: 5,097
- League: Honra - Série 2 AF Lisboa
- 2019–20: Honra - Série 2 AF Lisboa, 6th
- Website: https://www.adoeiras.pt/

Associação Desportiva de Oeiras is a Portuguese football club located in Oeiras, Portugal.

== Colours and badge ==
Oeiras' colours are red and white.

== International players ==
- (Cape Verde) Duk (youth)
