= 2003–04 Terceira Divisão =

Terceira Divisão
- Season: 2003–04

The 2003–04 Terceira Divisão season was the 57th season of the competition and the 14th season of recognised fourth-tier football in Portugal.

== Overview ==
The league was contested by 118 teams in 7 divisions of 10 to 18 teams.

== Terceira Divisão – Série A ==
Pos	Team	Pld	W	D	L	GF	GA	GD	Pts	Promotion or relegation
1	SC Valenciano	34	23	6	5	74	29	+45	75	Promotion to Segunda Divisão
2	Vilaverdense FC	34	21	9	4	45	13	+32	72	Promotion to Segunda Divisão
3	GD Joane	34	19	10	5	60	29	+31	67	
4	CD Monção	34	19	5	10	57	33	+24	62	
5	Santa Maria FC	34	16	9	9	46	35	+11	57	
6	SC Vianense	34	15	7	12	49	45	+4	52	
7	SC Mirandela	34	14	9	11	50	45	+5	51	
8	Os Sandinenses	34	13	9	12	35	40	−5	48	
9	AD Esposende	34	12	8	14	47	58	−11	44	
10	CA Cabeceirense	34	11	11	12	42	41	+1	44	
11	AD Valpaços	34	9	14	11	43	54	−11	41	
12	SC Maria da Fonte	34	9	12	13	39	44	−5	39	
13	CD Cerveira	34	10	8	16	48	56	−8	38	
14	AD Ponte da Barca	34	10	7	17	29	51	−22	37	
15	ADC Montalegre	34	7	11	16	37	53	−16	32	Relegation to Distritais
16	FC Amares	34	5	12	17	39	61	−22	27	Relegation to Distritais
17	Juventude Ronfe	34	6	8	20	34	58	−24	26	Relegation to Distritais
18	CD Rebordelo	34	5	9	20	30	60	−30	24	Relegation to Distritais

== Terceira Divisão – Série B ==
Pos	Team	Pld	W	D	L	GF	GA	GD	Pts	Promotion or relegation
1	GD Ribeirão	34	21	9	4	78	37	+41	72	Promotion to Segunda Divisão
2	Fiães SC	34	20	9	5	59	21	+38	69	Promotion to Segunda Divisão
3	Aliados Lordelo	34	17	7	10	48	37	+11	58	
4	SC Rio Tinto	34	15	11	8	54	35	+19	56	
5	AD São Pedro da Cova	34	16	6	12	72	47	+25	54	
6	Canelas Gaia FC	34	15	9	10	64	51	+13	54	
7	SC Vila Real	34	14	8	12	35	35	0	50	
8	FC Famalicão	34	15	5	14	48	51	−3	50	
9	Rebordosa AC	34	13	10	11	49	49	0	49	
10	FC Tirsense	34	15	4	15	45	46	−1	49	
11	AD Oliveirense	34	15	3	16	47	53	−6	48	
12	GD Torre de Moncorvo	34	13	7	14	55	49	+6	46	
13	Pedrouços AC	34	13	6	15	55	56	−1	45	
14	CD Cinfães	34	12	8	14	53	52	+1	44	
15	Lusitânia Lourosa	34	12	8	14	42	50	−8	44	Relegation to Distritais
16	União Nogueirense	34	8	6	20	32	51	−19	30	Relegation to Distritais
17	CD Paços de Brandão	34	6	7	21	33	74	−41	25	Relegation to Distritais
18	SC Régua	34	2	5	27	16	91	−75	11	Relegation to Distritais

== Terceira Divisão – Série C ==
Pos	Team	Pld	W	D	L	GF	GA	GD	Pts	Promotion or relegation
1	SC Penalva do Castelo	34	22	8	4	51	23	+28	74	Promotion to Segunda Divisão
2	GD Tourizense	34	17	12	5	68	43	+25	63	Promotion to Segunda Divisão
3	FC Cesarense	34	17	10	7	49	29	+20	61	
4	Anadia FC	34	17	8	9	51	30	+21	59	
5	GD Milheiroense	34	15	5	14	52	47	+5	50	
6	AD Valecambrense	34	12	10	12	48	43	+5	46	
7	RCS Lamas	34	12	9	13	47	43	+4	45	
8	GD Gafanha	34	13	6	15	41	46	−5	45	
9	União Coimbra	34	11	11	12	47	54	−7	44	
10	UD Tocha	34	12	7	15	37	49	−12	43	
11	GD Santacombadense	34	11	9	14	42	48	−6	42	
12	SC São João de Ver	34	12	6	16	47	50	−3	42	
13	AD Sátão	34	10	12	12	40	48	−8	42	
14	CD Arrifanense	34	11	7	16	46	61	−15	40	
15	FC Arouca	34	11	7	16	41	46	−5	40	Relegation to Distritais
16	AD Fornos de Algodres	34	9	12	13	47	48	−1	39	Relegation to Distritais
17	GD Mangualde	34	7	14	13	41	47	−6	41	Relegation to Distritais
18	Aguiar Beira	34	7	7	20	24	64	−40	28	Relegation to Distritais

== Terceira Divisão – Série D ==
Pos	Team	Pld	W	D	L	GF	GA	GD	Pts	Promotion or relegation
1	Benfica Castelo Branco	34	21	11	2	61	18	+43	74	Promotion to Segunda Divisão
2	Abrantes FC	34	22	7	5	82	32	+50	73	Promotion to Segunda Divisão
3	UD Rio Maior	34	20	8	6	72	39	+33	68	
4	GD Peniche	34	20	7	7	55	27	+28	67	
5	CD Torres Novas	34	19	4	11	68	54	+14	61	
6	GD Sourense	34	18	6	10	63	40	+23	60	
7	SC Lourinhanense	34	16	9	9	54	40	+14	57	
8	CA Riachense	34	15	10	9	48	35	+13	55	
9	União Idanhense	34	14	8	12	47	46	+1	50	
10	AD Fazendense	34	13	9	12	54	44	+10	48	
11	UD Caranguejeira	34	12	10	12	52	42	+10	46	
12	GDR Bidoeirense	34	12	6	16	46	45	+1	42	
13	Beneditense CD	34	10	9	15	47	57	−10	39	
14	Sertanense FC	34	7	8	19	32	59	−27	29	
15	GC Alcobaça	34	8	5	21	25	54	−29	29	Relegation to Distritais
16	CR Alqueidão da Serra	34	6	4	24	26	64	−38	22	Relegation to Distritais
17	União Mirense	34	4	9	21	28	82	−54	21	Relegation to Distritais
18	União Almeirim	34	3	2	29	23	100	−77	11	Relegation to Distritais

== Terceira Divisão – Série E ==
Pos	Team	Pld	W	D	L	GF	GA	GD	Pts	Promotion or relegation
1	Casa Pia AC	34	23	6	5	72	28	+44	75	Promotion to Segunda Divisão
2	CD Portosantense	34	20	9	5	75	32	+43	69	Promotion to Segunda Divisão
3	GS Loures	34	19	9	6	60	27	+33	66	
4	CSD Câmara de Lobos	34	15	11	8	54	34	+20	56	
5	S.L. Benfica B	34	15	9	10	63	47	+16	54	
6	SU 1º Dezembro	34	14	10	10	43	30	+13	52	
7	RSC Queluz	34	14	9	11	62	35	+27	51	
8	O Elvas CAD	34	15	4	15	47	50	−3	49	
9	GD Vialonga	34	14	5	15	50	66	−16	47	
10	CD Montijo	34	12	11	11	46	46	0	47	
11	AD Machico	34	12	9	13	43	37	+6	45	
12	AD Carregado	34	13	6	15	51	50	+1	45	
13	AC Malveira	34	10	13	11	40	41	−1	43	
14	UD Santana	34	11	8	15	35	41	−6	41	
15	GD Alcochetense	34	10	6	18	42	59	−17	36	Relegation to Distritais
16	SC Santacruzense	34	7	10	17	38	61	−23	31	Relegation to Distritais
17	SG Sacavenense	34	7	6	21	30	60	−30	27	Relegation to Distritais
18	SR Benavilense	34	3	3	28	15	112	−97	12	Relegation to Distritais

== Terceira Divisão – Série F ==
Pos	Team	Pld	W	D	L	GF	GA	GD	Pts	Promotion or relegation
1	Atlético CP	34	22	10	2	57	22	+35	76	Promotion to Segunda Divisão
2	Vasco da Gama AC Sines	34	20	9	5	54	27	+27	69	Promotion to Segunda Divisão
3	Imortal DC	34	19	10	5	63	32	+31	67	
4	Lusitano VRSA	34	16	9	9	63	37	+26	56	
5	CD Beja	34	14	10	10	48	49	−1	52	
6	GD Beira-Mar de Monte Gordo	34	14	9	11	53	49	+4	51	
7	GD Sesimbra	34	14	7	13	49	37	+12	49	
8	Juventude Évora	34	12	12	10	44	32	+12	48	
9	União Santiago	34	11	12	11	32	34	−2	45	
10	UD Messinense	34	12	9	13	54	50	+4	45	
11	Silves FC	34	12	9	13	48	49	−1	45	
12	Seixal FC	34	12	8	14	55	54	+1	44	
13	SR Almancilense	34	11	9	14	44	47	−3	42	
14	Moura AC	34	9	12	13	38	49	−11	39	
15	Fabril Barreiro	34	10	6	18	40	57	−17	36	Relegation to Distritais
16	GD Monte do Trigo	34	7	6	21	28	82	−54	27	Relegation to Distritais
17	CDR Quarteirense	34	6	6	22	33	61	−28	24	Relegation to Distritais
18	Esperança Lagos	34	6	5	23	53	87	−34	23	Relegation to Distritais

== Terceira Divisão – Série Açores ==
Série Açores – Preliminary League Table

Pos	Team	Pld	W	D	L	GF	GA	GD	Pts
1	CD Operário	18	12	5	1	41	15	+26	41
2	Santiago FC	18	11	4	3	32	15	+17	37
3	SC Angrense	18	10	4	4	32	21	+11	34
4	FC Madalena	18	9	3	6	46	32	+14	30
5	Praiense SC	18	8	5	5	25	16	+9	29
6	Boavista SC Flores	18	7	5	6	26	26	0	26
7	GD Velense	18	4	6	8	21	23	−2	18
8	SS Ideal	18	4	3	11	20	34	−14	15
9	SC Barreiro	18	2	5	11	13	39	−26	11
10	Mira Mar SC	18	2	2	14	17	52	−35	8

Série Açores – Promotion Group

Pos	Team	Pld	W	D	L	GF	GA	GD	BP	Pts	Promotion
1	CD Operário	8	7	0	1	17	8	+9	41	62	Promotion to Segunda Divisão
2	FC Madalena	8	4	2	2	13	11	+2	30	44	
3	Santiago FC	8	2	1	5	7	12	−5	37	44	
4	SC Angrense	8	2	0	6	7	13	−6	34	40	
5	Praiense SC	8	3	1	4	10	10	0	29	39	

Terceira Divisão - Série Açores Relegation Group

Pos	Team	Pld	W	D	L	GF	GA	GD	BP	Pts	Relegation
1	Boavista SC Flores	8	5	0	3	12	11	+1	26	41	
2	GD Velense	8	6	1	1	9	2	+7	18	37	
3	SC Ideal	8	4	1	3	7	6	+1	15	28	Relegation to Distritais
4	Mira Mar SC	8	2	2	4	7	7	0	8	16	Relegation to Distritais
5	SC Barreiro	8	1	0	7	3	12	−9	11	14	Relegation to Distritais
