= 1997–98 Terceira Divisão =

Terceira Divisão
- Season: 1997–98

The 1997–98 Terceira Divisão season was the 51st season of the competition and the 8th season of recognised fourth-tier football in Portugal.

== Overview ==
The league was contested by 120 teams in 7 divisions of 10 to 20 teams.

== Terceira Divisão – Série A ==
Pos	Team	Pld	W	D	L	GF	GA	GD	Pts	Promotion or relegation
1	AD Fafe	34	20	11	3	78	29	+49	71	Promotion to Segunda Divisão
2	Caçadores das Taipas	34	20	6	8	70	41	+29	66	Promotion to Segunda Divisão
3	GD Bragança	34	19	9	6	56	39	+17	66	
4	GD Pevidém	34	16	9	9	52	34	+18	57	
5	ADC Montalegre	34	15	7	12	57	50	+7	52	
6	FC Amares	34	13	13	8	61	39	+22	52	
7	Neves FC	34	14	7	13	54	50	+4	49	
8	GD Serzedelo	34	13	8	13	49	54	−5	47	
9	Vieira SC	34	12	10	12	55	44	+11	46	
10	GD Joane	34	10	15	9	48	42	+6	45	
11	Juventude Ronfe	34	12	7	15	52	55	−3	43	
12	SC Vila Pouca de Aguiar	34	11	10	13	50	46	+4	43	
13	Águias Graça	34	11	9	14	39	46	−7	42	
14	CA Macedo de Cavaleiros	34	11	8	15	37	48	−11	41	
15	CD Maximinense	34	10	9	15	45	48	−3	39	Relegation to Distritais
16	Âncora Praia FC	34	10	9	15	45	59	−14	39	Relegation to Distritais
17	SC Maria da Fonte	34	8	8	18	37	57	−20	32	Relegation to Distritais
18	SC Mirandela	34	2	3	29	18	122	−104	9	Relegation to Distritais

== Terceira Divisão – Série B ==
Pos	Team	Pld	W	D	L	GF	GA	GD	Pts	Promotion or relegation
1	SC Freamunde	34	27	4	3	88	26	+62	85	Promotion to Segunda Divisão
2	Ermesinde SC	34	19	9	6	44	25	+19	66	Promotion to Segunda Divisão
3	Dragões Sandinenses	34	18	10	6	63	33	+30	64	
4	SC Lamego	34	17	8	9	50	31	+19	59	
5	SC Rio Tinto	34	14	8	12	43	39	+4	50	
6	Pedrouços AC	34	13	11	10	49	46	+3	50	
7	Canelas Gaia FC	34	14	8	12	50	46	+4	50	
8	União Paredes	34	14	7	13	61	52	+9	49	
9	ADC Santa Marta de Penaguião	34	11	14	9	36	45	−9	47	
10	Fiães SC	34	12	7	15	41	45	−4	43	
11	Vilanovense FC	34	9	13	12	34	41	−7	40	
12	AD São Pedro da Cova	34	9	13	12	40	47	−7	40	
13	SC Castêlo da Maia	34	10	9	15	40	39	+1	39	
14	UD Valonguense	34	10	9	15	29	44	−15	39	
15	FC Alpendorada	34	8	12	14	32	41	−9	36	Relegation to Distritais
16	CD Cinfães	34	7	10	17	26	53	−27	31	Relegation to Distritais
17	CD Favaios	34	5	9	20	25	59	−34	24	Relegation to Distritais
18	SC Senhora da Hora	34	5	7	22	29	68	−39	22	Relegation to Distritais

== Terceira Divisão – Série C ==
Pos	Team	Pld	W	D	L	GF	GA	GD	Pts	Promotion or relegation
1	CD Arrifanense	34	22	6	6	84	38	+46	72	Promotion to Segunda Divisão
2	SC São João de Ver	34	20	7	7	59	29	+30	67	Promotion to Segunda Divisão
3	RD Águeda	34	17	8	9	70	38	+32	59	
4	Oliveira do Hospital	34	15	10	9	61	41	+20	55	
5	Anadia FC	34	15	10	9	69	48	+21	55	
6	AD Fornos de Algodres	34	14	9	11	53	45	+8	51	
7	Os Marialvas	34	15	5	14	67	47	+20	50	
8	AA Avanca	34	13	8	13	41	44	−3	47	
9	SC Penalva do Castelo	34	12	10	12	50	50	0	46	
10	FC Cesarense	34	13	7	14	40	46	−6	46	
11	Oliveira do Bairro	34	13	6	15	48	49	−1	45	
12	GD São Roque	34	13	6	15	33	45	−12	45	
13	CD Estarreja	34	12	7	15	46	46	0	43	
14	GD Mealhada	34	13	4	17	52	64	−12	43	
15	CD Tondela	34	12	5	17	35	59	−24	41	Relegation to Distritais
16	AD Nogueirense	34	9	5	20	44	82	−38	32	Relegation to Distritais
17	ADC Lobão	34	7	9	18	30	67	−37	30	Relegation to Distritais
18	UD Pinhelenses	34	8	4	22	49	93	−44	28	Relegation to Distritais

== Terceira Divisão – Série D ==
Pos	Team	Pld	W	D	L	GF	GA	GD	Pts	Promotion or relegation
1	GD Peniche	38	23	10	5	78	31	+47	79	Promotion to Segunda Divisão
2	CD Fátima	38	22	12	4	69	23	+46	78	Promotion to Segunda Divisão
3	AC Alcanenense	38	22	5	11	74	47	+27	71	
4	GD Sourense	38	20	8	10	71	45	+26	68	
5	SC Pombal	38	19	8	11	65	37	+28	65	
6	AD Fazendense	38	19	8	11	53	41	+12	65	
7	CA Riachense	38	19	7	12	67	41	+26	64	
8	Sertanense FC	38	17	9	12	52	57	−5	60	
9	GD Benavente	38	17	8	13	56	39	+17	59	
10	AC Marinhense	38	17	7	14	56	42	+14	58	
11	GDR Bidoeirense	38	14	11	13	50	47	+3	53	
12	UD Santarém	38	15	7	16	56	52	+4	52	
13	AD Portomosense	38	11	17	10	53	50	+3	50	
14	GD Coruchense	38	13	7	18	47	53	−6	46	
15	UD Rio Maior	38	11	11	16	56	63	−7	44	Relegation to Distritais
16	CA Mirandense	38	11	8	19	39	57	−18	41	Relegation to Distritais
17	Escolar Bombarralense	38	7	9	22	39	88	−49	30	Relegation to Distritais
18	AD Castelo de Vide	38	7	4	27	40	86	−46	25	Relegation to Distritais
19	GD Nazarenos	38	6	7	25	32	96	−64	25	Relegation to Distritais
20	RC Orvalho	38	5	7	26	30	88	−58	22	Relegation to Distritais

== Terceira Divisão – Série E ==
Pos	Team	Pld	W	D	L	GF	GA	GD	Pts	Promotion or relegation
1	UD Vilafranquense	34	22	8	4	73	31	+42	74	Promotion to Segunda Divisão
2	SU Sintrense	34	20	10	4	71	23	+48	70	Promotion to Segunda Divisão
3	Odivelas FC	34	15	6	13	59	50	+9	51	
4	GD Samora Correia	34	13	12	9	53	40	+13	51	
5	SL Olivais	34	12	12	10	42	30	+12	48	
6	GD Vialonga	34	14	6	14	50	43	+7	48	
7	GS Loures	34	11	14	9	47	42	+5	47	
8	CD Portosantense	34	14	5	15	35	37	−2	47	
9	Águias Camarate	34	12	11	11	45	46	−1	47	
10	1º Maio Sarilhense	34	13	6	15	42	63	−21	45	
11	CD Olivais e Moscavide	34	12	9	13	36	35	+1	45	
12	SG Sacavenense	34	10	15	9	43	47	−4	45	
13	CF Benfica	34	12	7	15	41	54	−13	43	
14	CD São Vicente	34	10	11	13	37	40	−3	41	
15	SC Santacruzense	34	10	9	15	36	59	−23	39	Relegation to Distritais
16	AC Malveira	34	7	14	13	36	50	−14	35	Relegation to Distritais
17	RSC Queluz	34	7	12	15	24	46	−22	33	Relegation to Distritais
18	CF Caniçal	34	4	9	21	29	63	−34	21	Relegation to Distritais

== Terceira Divisão – Série F ==
Pos	Team	Pld	W	D	L	GF	GA	GD	Pts	Promotion or relegation
1	Louletano DC	34	19	12	3	66	17	+49	69	Promotion to Segunda Divisão
2	Amora FC	34	19	6	9	54	32	+22	63	Promotion to Segunda Divisão
3	GD Pescadores	34	18	8	8	66	42	+24	62	
4	Vasco da Gama AC Sines	34	18	4	12	57	40	+17	58	
5	GD Lagoa	34	16	6	12	52	49	+3	54	
6	Padernense Clube	34	15	9	10	61	52	+9	54	
7	FC Castrense	34	14	10	10	54	41	+13	52	
8	Esperança Lagos	34	14	8	12	54	51	+3	50	
9	Lusitano Évora	34	14	6	14	49	40	+9	48	
10	Almada AC	34	11	13	10	46	46	0	46	
11	Ourique DC	34	12	9	13	40	41	−1	45	
12	Palmelense FC	34	10	9	15	42	48	−6	39	
13	Lusitano VRSA	34	9	11	14	36	47	−11	38	
14	CD Montijo	34	8	13	13	38	49	−11	37	
15	CRD Santaluziense	34	9	9	16	37	56	−19	36	Relegation to Distritais
16	União Santiago	34	8	9	17	34	60	−26	33	Relegation to Distritais
17	UFCI Setúbal	34	8	7	19	40	55	−15	31	Relegation to Distritais
18	SC Bencatelense	34	5	9	20	30	90	−60	24	Relegation to Distritais

== Terceira Divisão – Série Açores ==
Série Açores – Preliminary League Table

Pos	Team	Pld	W	D	L	GF	GA	GD	Pts
1	CD Operário	18	12	5	1	36	16	+20	41
2	União Micaelense	18	10	6	2	41	25	+16	36
3	Praiense SC	18	10	6	2	31	16	+15	36
4	CD Vila Franca	18	7	7	4	15	14	+1	28
5	JD Lajense	18	6	6	6	22	23	−1	24
6	Águia DC	18	6	3	9	23	30	−7	21
7	SC Ideal	18	5	4	9	22	31	−9	19
8	Os Marítimos	18	3	7	8	20	23	−3	16
9	Mira Mar SC	18	1	7	10	19	33	−14	10
10	Fayal SC	18	1	7	10	7	25	−18	10

Série Açores – Promotion Group

Pos	Team	Pld	W	D	L	GF	GA	GD	BP	Pts	Promotion
1	CD Operário	8	5	3	0	10	4	+6	21	39	Promotion to Segunda Divisão
2	União Micaelense	8	6	2	0	22	7	+15	18	38	
3	CD Vila Franca	8	2	1	5	9	12	−3	18	25	
4	Praiense SC	8	2	1	5	10	16	−6	15	22	
5	JD Lajense	8	1	1	6	10	22	−12	12	16	

Terceira Divisão - Série Açores Relegation Group

Pos	Team	Pld	W	D	L	GF	GA	GD	BP	Pts	Relegation
1	Águia DC	8	4	3	1	8	4	+4	11	26	
2	SC Ideal	8	3	4	1	5	2	+3	10	23	
3	Fayal SC	8	4	2	2	9	5	+4	8	22	Relegation to Distritais
4	Os Marítimos	8	2	0	6	6	13	−7	8	14	Relegation to Distritais
5	Mira Mar SC	8	2	1	5	6	10	−4	2	9	Relegation to Distritais
