= 2007–08 Terceira Divisão =

Terceira Divisão
- Season: 2007–08

The 2007–08 Terceira Divisão season was the 61st season of the competition and the 18th season of recognised fourth-tier football in Portugal.

== Overview ==
The league was contested by 94 teams in 7 divisions of 10 to 14 teams.

== Terceira Divisão – Série A ==
Série A – Preliminary League Table

Pos	Team	Pld	W	D	L	GF	GA	GD	Pts	Qualification (Note: Errors in table: 135 total wins != 134 total losses, and 95 total draws is an odd number.)
1	Vieira SC	26	14	5	7	38	24	+14	47	
2	SC Mirandela	26	12	10	4	37	21	+16	46	
3	SC Vianense	26	13	5	8	46	23	+23	44	
4	Mondinense FC	26	12	7	7	39	24	+15	43	
5	GD Joane	26	12	6	8	32	23	+9	42	
6	GD Bragança	26	11	9	6	31	25	+6	42	
7	FC Marinhas	26	12	5	9	31	25	+6	41	
8	CA Macedo de Cavaleiros	26	12	5	9	37	34	+3	41	
9	Vidago FC	26	9	7	10	25	24	+1	34	
10	SC Valenciano	26	8	9	9	31	31	0	33	
11	FC Amares	26	9	6	11	20	27	−7	33	
12	GD Prado	26	6	9	11	23	37	−14	27	
13	Brito SC	26	3	7	16	19	48	−29	16	
14	Morais FC	26	2	5	19	16	59	−43	11	

Notes:

Série A – Promotion Group

Pos	Team	Pld	W	D	L	GF	GA	GD	BP	Pts	Promotion
1	SC Mirandela	10	4	4	2	12	9	+3	23	39	Promotion to Segunda Divisão
2	SC Vianense	10	4	5	1	14	10	+4	22	39	Promotion to Segunda Divisão
3	Vieira SC	10	3	6	1	11	8	+3	24	39	
4	GD Joane	10	3	2	5	7	10	−3	21	32	
5	Mondinense FC	10	2	4	4	9	12	−3	22	32	
6	GD Bragança	10	3	1	6	10	14	−4	21	31	

Série A – Relegation Group 1

Pos	Team	Pld	W	D	L	GF	GA	GD	BP	Pts	Relegation
1	FC Marinhas	4	2	1	1	6	5	+1	21	28	
2	FC Amares	4	2	1	1	5	3	+2	17	24	
3	Vidago FC	4	1	0	3	4	7	−3	17	20	Relegation to Distritais
4	Brito SC	0	0	0	0	0	0	0	8	8	Relegation to Distritais

Série A – Relegation Group 2

Pos	Team	Pld	W	D	L	GF	GA	GD	BP	Pts	Relegation
1	CA Macedo de Cavaleiros	6	3	2	1	10	4	+6	21	32	
2	GD Prado	6	4	2	0	10	1	+9	14	28	
3	SC Valenciano	6	1	2	3	7	8	−1	17	22	Relegation to Distritais
4	Morais FC	6	1	0	5	2	16	−14	5	8	Relegation to Distritais

== Terceira Divisão – Série B ==
Série B – Preliminary League Table

Pos	Team	Pld	W	D	L	GF	GA	GD	Pts	Qualification (Note: Errors in table: 140 total wins != 139 total losses, 85 total draws is an odd number, and 454 total for != 453 total against.)
1	AD Oliveirense	26	14	8	4	41	22	+19	50	
2	Amarante FC	26	15	5	6	43	26	+17	50	
3	Padroense FC	26	13	5	8	44	30	+14	44	
4	União Paredes	26	12	5	9	34	28	+6	41	
5	Aliados Lordelo	26	12	5	9	32	27	+5	41	
6	GD Serzedelo	26	12	4	10	39	33	+6	40	
7	GD Torre de Moncorvo	26	11	5	10	30	29	+1	38	
8	Rebordosa AC	26	9	8	9	26	26	0	35	
9	União Nogueirense	26	9	7	10	33	35	−2	34	
10	AD São Pedro da Cova	26	9	6	11	29	44	−15	33	
11	CF Oliveira do Douro	26	6	9	11	28	33	−5	27	
12	FC Pedras Rubras	26	7	4	15	27	44	−17	25	
13	FC Famalicão	26	6	6	14	26	45	−19	24	
14	FC Maia	26	5	8	13	22	31	−9	23	

Notes:

Série B – Promotion Group

Pos	Team	Pld	W	D	L	GF	GA	GD	BP	Pts	Promotion
1	Amarante FC	10	8	1	1	27	12	+15	25	50	Promotion to Segunda Divisão
2	Aliados Lordelo	10	6	3	1	16	5	+11	21	42	Promotion to Segunda Divisão
3	Padroense FC	10	4	0	6	12	21	−9	22	34	
4	AD Oliveirense	10	2	3	5	13	18	−5	25	34	
5	União Paredes	10	4	0	6	13	15	−2	21	33	
6	GD Serzedelo	10	2	1	7	6	16	−10	20	27	

Série B – Relegation Group 1

Pos	Team	Pld	W	D	L	GF	GA	GD	BP	Pts	Relegation
1	GD Torre de Moncorvo	6	3	2	1	13	8	+5	19	30	
2	CF Oliveira do Douro	6	3	3	0	10	4	+6	14	26	
3	Nogueirense FC	6	2	2	2	8	4	+4	17	25	Relegation to Distritais
4	FC Famalicão	6	0	1	5	3	18	−15	12	13	Relegation to Distritais

Série B – Relegation Group 2

Pos	Team	Pld	W	D	L	GF	GA	GD	BP	Pts	Relegation
1	Rebordosa AC	6	3	0	3	7	10	−3	18	27	
2	FC Maia	6	4	2	0	16	5	+11	12	26	
3	AD São Pedro da Cova	6	2	1	3	7	10	−3	17	24	Relegation to Distritais
4	FC Pedras Rubras	6	1	1	4	6	11	−5	13	17	Relegation to Distritais

== Terceira Divisão – Série C ==
Série C – Preliminary League Table

Pos	Team	Pld	W	D	L	GF	GA	GD	Pts
1	FC Arouca	26	14	6	6	40	20	+20	48
2	Académico Viseu	26	13	8	5	44	24	+20	47
3	AD Sanjoanense	26	12	9	5	47	21	+26	45
4	GD Milheiroense	26	11	10	5	36	21	+15	43
5	União Lamas	26	11	7	8	37	29	+8	40
6	AD Valecambrense	26	10	9	7	32	21	+11	39
7	Oliveira do Hospital	26	10	8	8	37	25	+12	38
8	RCS Lamas	26	9	9	8	26	23	+3	36
9	CD Tondela	26	9	8	9	30	25	+5	35
10	UD Tocha	26	10	5	11	31	28	+3	35
11	SC São João de Ver	26	9	6	11	32	36	−4	33
12	GC Figueirense	26	7	8	11	27	38	−11	29
13	AD Valonguense	26	5	11	10	13	23	−10	26
14	Dragões Sandinenses	26	0	0	26	12	110	−98	0

Série C – Promotion Group

Pos	Team	Pld	W	D	L	GF	GA	GD	BP	Pts	Promotion
1	FC Arouca	10	7	3	0	19	6	+13	24	48	Promotion to Segunda Divisão
2	AD Sanjoanense	10	8	0	2	19	8	+11	23	47	Promotion to Segunda Divisão
3	GD Milheiroense	10	2	3	5	9	14	−5	22	31	
4	AD Valecambrense	10	3	2	5	13	15	−2	20	31	
5	União Lamas	10	3	1	6	8	20	−12	20	30	
6	Académico Viseu	10	1	3	6	10	15	−5	24	30	

Série C – Relegation Group 1

Pos	Team	Pld	W	D	L	GF	GA	GD	BP	Pts	Relegation
1	CD Tondela	6	4	1	1	11	3	+8	18	31	
2	SC São João de Ver	6	4	1	1	8	2	+6	17	30	
3	Oliveira do Hospital	6	1	1	4	3	6	−3	19	23	Relegation to Distritais
4	AD Valonguense	6	1	1	4	3	14	−11	13	17	Relegation to Distritais

Série C – Relegation Group 2

Pos	Team	Pld	W	D	L	GF	GA	GD	BP	Pts	Relegation
1	UD Tocha	6	5	0	1	24	6	+18	18	33	
2	RCS Lamas	6	3	1	2	21	7	+14	18	28	
3	GC Figueirense	6	3	1	2	22	9	+13	15	25	Relegation to Distritais
4	Dragões Sandinenses	6	0	0	6	5	50	−45	0	0	Relegation to Distritais

== Terceira Divisão – Série D ==
Série D – Preliminary League Table

Pos	Team	Pld	W	D	L	GF	GA	GD	Pts
1	GDR Monsanto	26	17	5	4	58	24	+34	56
2	Estrela Unhais da Serra	26	13	7	6	25	14	+11	46
3	UD Serra	26	13	6	7	41	26	+15	45
4	Sertanense FC	26	11	12	3	26	13	+13	45
5	AC Marinhense	26	12	7	7	26	22	+4	43
6	GD Sourense	26	10	11	5	31	17	+14	41
7	SC Pombal	26	11	7	8	31	21	+10	40
8	AD Portomosense	26	11	7	8	33	28	+5	40
9	GC Alcobaça	26	11	6	9	31	28	+3	39
10	UD Gândara	26	9	8	9	33	29	+4	35
11	CD Lousanense	26	8	5	13	26	32	−6	29
12	AD Penamacorense	26	7	6	13	23	36	−13	27
13	CA Mirandense	26	2	5	19	13	43	−30	11
14	UD Caranguejeira	26	1	0	25	9	73	−64	3

Série D – Promotion Group

Pos	Team	Pld	W	D	L	GF	GA	GD	BP	Pts	Promotion
1	GDR Monsanto	10	5	2	3	15	11	+4	28	45	Promotion to Segunda Divisão
2	UD Serra	10	6	3	1	18	9	+9	23	44	Promotion to Segunda Divisão
3	Sertanense FC	10	5	4	1	15	8	+7	23	42	
4	Estrela Unhais da Serra	10	2	4	4	10	8	+2	23	33	
5	AC Marinhense	10	1	4	5	9	16	−7	22	29	
6	GD Sourense	10	1	3	6	12	27	−15	21	27	

Série D – Relegation Group 1

Pos	Team	Pld	W	D	L	GF	GA	GD	BP	Pts	Relegation
1	SC Pombal	6	4	1	1	9	2	+7	20	33	
2	CD Lousanense	6	3	3	0	6	2	+4	15	27	
3	GC Alcobaça	6	1	2	3	7	10	−3	20	25	Relegation to Distritais
4	CA Mirandense	6	1	0	5	4	12	−8	6	9	Relegation to Distritais

Série D – Relegation Group 2

Pos	Team	Pld	W	D	L	GF	GA	GD	BP	Pts	Relegation
1	UD Gândara	6	4	1	1	16	8	+8	18	31	
2	AD Penamacorense	6	4	1	1	17	9	+8	14	27	
3	AD Portomosense	6	2	0	4	4	5	−1	20	26	Relegation to Distritais
4	UD Caranguejeira	6	1	0	5	4	19	−15	2	5	Relegation to Distritais

== Terceira Divisão – Série E ==
Série E – Preliminary League Table

Pos	Team	Pld	W	D	L	GF	GA	GD	Pts
1	Oriental Lisboa	26	15	7	4	45	24	+21	52
2	O Elvas CAD	26	15	6	5	48	33	+15	51
3	UD Santana	26	12	9	5	37	25	+12	45
4	GD Igreja Nova	26	10	11	5	35	23	+12	41
5	CSD Câmara de Lobos	26	11	8	7	49	35	+14	41
6	Atlético Cacém	26	11	4	11	38	41	−3	37
7	GD Alcochetense	26	10	7	9	33	29	+4	37
8	SU Sintrense	26	9	10	7	36	29	+7	37
9	SU 1º Dezembro	26	9	9	8	26	23	+3	36
10	Escolar Bombarralense	26	9	8	9	27	32	−5	35
11	Estrela Vendas Novas	26	5	12	9	29	33	−4	27
12	SL Cartaxo	26	6	5	15	30	53	−23	23
13	AD Fazendense	26	4	8	14	21	42	−21	20
14	Estrela Portalegre	26	1	6	19	16	48	−32	9

Série E – Promotion Group

Pos	Team	Pld	W	D	L	GF	GA	GD	BP	Pts	Promotion
1	Oriental Lisboa	10	8	0	2	16	7	+9	26	50	Promotion to Segunda Divisão
2	UD Santana	10	7	1	2	19	11	+8	23	45	Promotion to Segunda Divisão
3	O Elvas CAD	10	6	1	3	20	14	+6	26	45	
4	GD Igreja Nova	10	3	2	5	16	15	+1	21	32	
5	Atlético Cacém	10	3	1	6	11	19	−8	19	29	
6	CSD Câmara de Lobos	10	0	1	9	5	21	−16	21	22	

Série E – Relegation Group 1

Pos	Team	Pld	W	D	L	GF	GA	GD	BP	Pts	Relegation
1	SU 1º Dezembro	6	3	2	1	12	7	+5	18	29	
2	GD Alcochetense	6	2	2	2	9	9	0	19	27	
3	Estrela Vendas Novas	6	4	0	2	10	6	+4	14	26	Relegation to Distritais
4	AD Fazendense	6	1	0	5	6	15	−9	10	13	Relegation to Distritais

Série E – Relegation Group 2

Pos	Team	Pld	W	D	L	GF	GA	GD	BP	Pts	Relegation
1	SU Sintrense	4	2	1	1	4	4	0	19	26	
2	SL Cartaxo	4	3	1	0	7	3	+4	12	22	
3	Escolar Bombarralense	4	0	0	4	3	7	−4	18	18	Relegation to Distritais
4	Estrela Portalegre	0	0	0	0	0	0	0	5	5	Relegation to Distritais

== Terceira Divisão – Série F ==
Série F – Preliminary League Table

Pos	Team	Pld	W	D	L	GF	GA	GD	Pts
1	Mineiro Aljustrelense	26	12	8	6	38	26	+12	44
2	FC Barreirense	26	11	10	5	43	22	+21	43
3	GD Beira-Mar de Monte Gordo	26	11	8	7	34	27	+7	41
4	Fabril Barreiro	26	11	7	8	38	35	+3	40
5	CDR Quarteirense	26	10	9	7	32	28	+4	39
6	Juventude Campinense	26	11	5	10	36	29	+7	38
7	SR Almancilense	26	9	11	6	28	23	+5	38
8	CD Cova da Piedade	26	10	7	9	34	37	−3	37
9	Lusitano Évora	26	10	7	9	36	35	+1	37
10	FC Ferreiras	26	9	8	9	35	30	+5	35
11	Silves FC	26	6	11	9	29	36	−7	29
12	Amora FC	26	8	4	14	26	40	−14	28
13	Imortal DC	26	5	8	13	33	51	−18	23
14	União Montemor	26	5	5	16	24	48	−24	20

Série F – Promotion Group

Pos	Team	Pld	W	D	L	GF	GA	GD	BP	Pts	Promotion
1	Mineiro Aljustrelense	10	5	3	2	14	11	+3	22	40	Promotion to Segunda Divisão
2	GD Beira-Mar de Monte Gordo	10	6	0	4	13	8	+5	21	39	Promotion to Segunda Divisão
3	CDR Quarteirense	10	4	3	3	14	13	+1	20	35	
4	FC Barreirense	10	3	4	3	8	8	0	22	35	
5	Juventude Campinense	10	3	2	5	11	14	−3	19	30	
6	Fabril Barreiro	10	2	2	6	10	16	−6	20	28	

Série F – Relegation Group 1

Pos	Team	Pld	W	D	L	GF	GA	GD	BP	Pts	Relegation
1	Lusitano Évora	6	2	1	3	4	6	−2	19	26	
2	Silves FC	6	3	2	1	15	8	+7	15	26	
3	SR Almancilense	6	1	4	1	7	5	+2	19	26	Relegation to Distritais
4	Imortal DC	6	2	1	3	6	13	−7	12	19	Relegation to Distritais

Série F – Relegation Group 2

Pos	Team	Pld	W	D	L	GF	GA	GD	BP	Pts	Relegation
1	CD Cova da Piedade	6	5	1	0	11	3	+8	19	35	
2	FC Ferreiras	6	3	1	2	7	4	+3	18	28	
3	Amora FC	6	2	1	3	6	9	−3	14	21	Relegation to Distritais
4	União Montemor	6	0	1	5	4	12	−8	10	11	Relegation to Distritais

== Terceira Divisão – Série Açores ==
Série Açores – Preliminary League Table

Pos	Team	Pld	W	D	L	GF	GA	GD	Pts
1	União Micaelense	18	9	6	3	26	13	+13	33
2	SC Praiense	18	9	5	4	31	14	+17	32
3	Capelense SC	18	8	6	4	28	20	+8	30
4	SC Angrense	18	9	3	6	27	24	+3	30
5	CD Rabo de Peixe	18	8	3	7	23	22	+1	27
6	Boavista São Mateus	18	6	7	5	21	24	−3	25
7	Santiago FC	18	5	9	4	26	24	+2	24
8	Marítimo São Mateus	18	5	7	6	21	22	−1	22
9	Fayal SC	18	4	4	10	24	35	−11	16
10	Juventude Lajense	18	1	2	15	6	32	−26	5

Série Açores – Promotion Group

Pos	Team	Pld	W	D	L	GF	GA	GD	BP	Pts	Promotion
1	SC Praiense	8	5	3	0	11	2	+9	32	50	Promotion to Segunda Divisão
2	União Micaelense	8	4	3	1	9	6	+3	33	48	
3	Capelense SC	8	3	1	4	16	14	+2	30	40	
4	SC Angrense	8	2	2	4	12	14	−2	30	38	
5	CD Rabo de Peixe	8	1	1	6	11	23	−12	27	31	

Série Açores – Relegation Group

Pos	Team	Pld	W	D	L	GF	GA	GD	BP	Pts	Relegation
1	Boavista São Mateus	8	4	1	3	17	10	+7	25	38	
2	Santiago FC	8	4	2	2	14	11	+3	24	38	Relegation to Distritais
3	Marítimo São Mateus	8	4	3	1	13	8	+5	22	37	Relegation to Distritais
4	Fayal SC	8	2	2	4	9	15	−6	16	24	Relegation to Distritais
5	Juventude Lajense	8	1	2	5	7	16	−9	5	10	Relegation to Distritais
