= 2008–09 Terceira Divisão =

Terceira Divisão
- Season: 2008–09

The 2008–09 Terceira Divisão season was the 62nd season of the competition and the 19th season of recognised fourth-tier football in Portugal.

== Overview ==
The league was contested by 92 teams in 7 divisions of 10 to 14 teams.

== Terceira Divisão – Série A ==
Série A – Preliminary League Table

Pos	Team	Pld	W	D	L	GF	GA	GD	Pts
1	Vieira SC	26	15	8	3	44	19	+25	53
2	GD Bragança	26	15	3	8	28	22	+6	48
3	GD Joane	26	13	7	6	41	29	+12	46
4	Merelinense FC	26	12	5	9	42	27	+15	41
5	AD Fafe	26	11	8	7	33	25	+8	41
6	AD Limianos	26	11	7	8	38	33	+5	40
7	CA Macedo de Cavaleiros	26	10	8	8	37	26	+11	38
8	CF Fão	26	10	7	9	41	27	+14	37
9	Vilaverdense FC	26	8	8	10	37	38	−1	32
10	GD Prado	26	7	10	9	23	28	−5	31
11	FC Amares	26	6	9	11	41	45	−4	27
12	FC Marinhas	26	6	9	11	40	46	−6	27
13	Mondinense FC	26	5	7	14	22	45	−23	22
14	FC Mãe de Água	26	3	4	19	23	80	−57	13

Série A – Promotion Group
Série A – Relegation Group A
Série A – Relegation Group B

== Terceira Divisão – Série B ==
Série B – Preliminary League Table

Pos	Team	Pld	W	D	L	GF	GA	GD	Pts
1	Rebordosa AC	24	12	7	5	45	34	+11	43
2	Padroense FC	24	12	6	6	41	33	+8	42
3	AD Oliveirense	24	11	8	5	30	19	+11	41
4	União Paredes	24	11	8	5	31	21	+10	41
5	Leça FC	24	10	6	8	43	34	+9	36
6	SC Coimbrões	24	10	6	8	33	28	+5	36
7	AC Vila Meã	24	9	9	6	40	36	+4	36
8	GD Serzedelo	24	9	5	10	33	36	−3	32
9	GD Torre de Moncorvo	24	7	8	9	22	27	−5	29
10	CF Oliveira do Douro	24	7	7	10	29	37	−8	28
11	SC Vila Real	24	6	7	11	31	38	−7	25
12	FC Alpendorada	24	5	4	15	24	41	−17	19
13	FC Lixa	24	5	3	16	32	50	−18	18

Série B – Promotion Group
Série B – Relegation Group A
Série B – Relegation Group B

== Terceira Divisão – Série C ==
Série C – Preliminary League Table

Pos	Team	Pld	W	D	L	GF	GA	GD	Pts	Qualification
1	Fiães SC	26	15	6	5	45	25	+20	51	Promotion Group
2	CD Cinfães	26	14	7	5	37	25	+12	49	Promotion Group
3	Académico Viseu	26	13	4	9	42	28	+14	43	Promotion Group
4	CD Tondela	26	12	7	7	45	32	+13	43	Promotion Group
5	Anadia FC	26	11	9	6	36	24	+12	42	Promotion Group
6	UD Tocha	26	12	6	8	40	29	+11	42	Promotion Group
7	GD Milheiroense	26	10	8	8	32	27	+5	38	Relegation Group B
8	União Lamas	26	9	7	10	31	31	0	34	Relegation Group A
9	RD Águeda	26	10	4	12	29	41	−12	34	Relegation Group B
10	AA Avanca	26	8	4	14	33	42	−9	28	Relegation Group A
11	AD Fornos de Algodres	26	6	8	12	27	37	−10	26	Relegation Group B
12	AD Valecambrense	26	6	7	13	25	46	−21	25	Relegation Group A
13	AD Sátão	26	5	8	13	19	35	−16	23	Relegation Group B
14	SC São João de Ver	26	5	7	14	26	45	−19	22	Relegation Group A

Série C – Promotion Group

Pos	Team	Pld	W	D	L	GF	GA	GD	BP	Pts	Promotion
1	CD Tondela	10	6	2	2	19	13	+6	22	42	Promotion to Segunda Divisão
2	Académico Viseu	10	5	3	2	15	10	+5	22	40	Promotion to Segunda Divisão
3	Anadia FC	10	5	4	1	11	4	+7	21	40	
4	UD Tocha	10	3	3	4	8	13	−5	21	33	
5	CD Cinfães	10	1	5	4	13	17	−4	23	31	
6	Fiães SC	10	0	3	7	11	20	−9	26	29	

Série C – Relegation Group A

Pos	Team	Pld	W	D	L	GF	GA	GD	BP	Pts	Relegation
1	AA Avanca	6	3	2	1	12	7	+5	14	25	
2	SC São João de Ver	6	4	1	1	10	6	+4	11	24	
3	AD Valecambrense	6	2	1	3	10	10	0	17	24	Relegation to Distritais
4	União Lamas	6	0	2	4	3	12	−9	13	15	Relegation to Distritais

Série C – Relegation Group B

Pos	Team	Pld	W	D	L	GF	GA	GD	BP	Pts	Relegation
1	GD Milheiroense	6	2	3	1	6	4	+2	19	28	
2	AD Fornos de Algodres	6	4	1	1	7	2	+5	13	26	
3	RD Águeda	6	3	0	3	10	9	+1	17	26	Relegation to Distritais
4	AD Sátão	6	0	2	4	1	9	−8	12	14	Relegation to Distritais

== Terceira Divisão – Série D ==
Série D – Preliminary League Table

Pos	Team	Pld	W	D	L	GF	GA	GD	Pts
1	Sertanense FC	26	15	7	4	56	25	+31	52
2	AC Marinhense	26	13	4	9	45	31	+14	43
3	Benfica Castelo Branco	26	10	13	3	30	20	+10	43
4	UD Gândara	26	10	10	6	31	19	+12	40
5	SC Pombal	26	9	10	7	26	22	+4	37
6	O Vigor da Mocidade	26	9	9	8	30	23	+7	36
7	AD Penamacorense	26	9	6	11	32	30	+2	33
8	CD Lousanense	26	8	9	9	28	36	−8	33
9	GD Sourense	26	7	10	9	27	36	−9	31
10	Caldas SC	26	6	12	8	23	31	−8	30
11	GD Peniche	26	7	8	11	28	26	+2	29
12	FC Estrela Unhais da Serra	26	6	9	11	22	33	−11	27
13	CR Atalaia do Campo	26	6	9	11	35	61	−26	27
14	CD Torres Novas	26	6	6	14	27	47	−20	24

Série D – Promotion Group
Série D – Relegation Group A
Série D – Relegation Group B

== Terceira Divisão – Série E ==
Série E – Preliminary League Table

Pos	Team	Pld	W	D	L	GF	GA	GD	Pts
1	AD Camacha	26	18	6	2	55	18	+37	60
2	GD Igreja Nova	26	13	8	5	38	24	+14	47
3	UD Rio Maior	26	11	9	6	30	25	+5	42
4	Casa Pia AC	26	12	5	9	42	28	+14	41
5	CD Portosantense	26	11	7	8	33	26	+7	40
6	SU Sintrense	26	10	8	8	30	27	+3	38
7	AD Machico	26	9	8	9	27	37	−10	35
8	SU 1º Dezembro	26	8	10	8	33	32	+1	34
9	O Elvas CAD	26	9	6	11	35	34	+1	33
10	CSD Câmara de Lobos	26	7	11	8	38	39	−1	32
11	CF Benfica	26	7	10	9	33	40	−7	31
12	FC Crato	26	6	7	13	21	37	−16	25
13	Atlético Cacém	26	3	8	15	25	47	−22	17
14	SL Cartaxo	26	4	5	17	30	56	−26	17

Série E – Promotion Group
Série E – Relegation Group A
Série E – Relegation Group B

== Terceira Divisão – Série F ==
Série F – Preliminary League Table

Pos	Team	Pld	W	D	L	GF	GA	GD	Pts
1	Louletano DC	26	18	6	2	40	13	+27	60
2	CD Cova da Piedade	26	16	6	4	39	20	+19	54
3	Atlético Reguengos de Monsaraz	26	15	5	6	53	32	+21	50
4	SC Farense	26	12	6	8	40	35	+5	42
5	Juventude Évora	26	12	6	8	29	25	+4	42
6	GD Pescadores	26	11	7	8	40	28	+12	40
7	Fabril Barreiro	26	8	8	10	30	35	−5	32
8	FC Barreirense	26	7	10	9	23	27	−4	31
9	FC Castrense	26	7	9	10	25	30	−5	30
10	Lusitano Évora	26	7	8	11	21	31	−10	29
11	Juventude Campinense	26	5	13	8	27	25	+2	28
12	CDR Quarteirense	26	5	8	13	30	46	−16	23
13	UD Messinense	26	5	4	17	22	48	−26	19
14	Silves FC	26	4	4	18	21	45	−24	16

Série F – Promotion Group
Série F – Relegation Group A
Série F – Relegation Group B

== Terceira Divisão – Série Açores ==
Série Açores – Preliminary League Table

Pos	Team	Pld	W	D	L	GF	GA	GD	Pts
1	FC Madalena	18	9	5	4	33	18	+15	32
2	SC Angrense	18	8	7	3	30	19	+11	31
3	Boavista São Mateus	18	8	7	3	17	10	+7	31
4	Capelense SC	18	8	6	4	32	21	+11	30
5	Vitória FC do Pico	18	8	6	4	28	24	+4	30
6	SC Lusitânia	18	7	7	4	19	17	+2	28
7	União Micaelense	18	5	6	7	18	23	−5	21
8	CD Rabo de Peixe	18	3	5	10	23	34	−11	14
9	Marítimo São Miguel	18	3	5	10	12	25	−13	14
10	SC Vilanovense	18	2	4	12	17	38	−21	10

Série Açores – Promotion Group

Pos	Team	Pld	W	D	L	GF	GA	GD	BP	Pts	Promotion
1	Vitória FC do Pico	8	4	2	2	9	9	0	30	44	Promotion to Segunda Divisão
2	SC Angrense	8	3	3	2	11	8	+3	31	43	
3	FC Madalena	8	2	4	2	7	5	+2	32	42	
4	Boavista São Mateus	8	2	2	4	9	13	−4	31	39	
5	Capelense SC	8	1	5	2	6	7	−1	30	38	

Série Açores – Relegation Group

Pos	Team	Pld	W	D	L	GF	GA	GD	BP	Pts	Relegation
1	SC Lusitânia	8	4	1	3	10	8	+2	28	41	
2	CD Rabo de Peixe	8	7	0	1	14	5	+9	14	35	
3	União Micaelense	8	3	2	3	9	10	−1	21	32	
4	Marítimo São Miguel	8	2	2	4	11	13	−2	14	22	Relegation to Distritais
5	SC Vilanovense	8	1	1	6	10	18	−8	10	14	Relegation to Distritais
