= Hugo Viveiros =

Portuguese footballer

Personal information
- Full name: Hugo Miguel Figueira Viveiros
- Date of birth: 25 September 1995 (age 31)
- Place of birth: Ponta Delgada, Portugal
- Height: 1.91 m (6 ft 3 in)
- Position: Goalkeeper

Team information
- Current team: Ideal

Youth career
- 2004–2014: Santa Clara

Senior career*
Years	Team	Apps	(Gls)
2013–2015	Santa Clara	3	(0)
2015	Vilafranquense	0	(0)
2016	Sacavenense	0	(0)
2016–2018	Operário	10	(0)
2018	Rabo de Peixe	0	(0)
2018–2019	Vitória P. Pedra	6	(0)
2019	São Roque	5	(0)
2020–2021	Operário	15	(0)
2021–	Ideal	3	(0)
- * Club domestic league appearances and goals as of 15 October 2021

Hugo Miguel Figueira Viveiros (born 25 September 1995) is a Portuguese footballer who plays for SC Ideal as a goalkeeper.

== Career ==
On 28 April 2014, Viveiros made his professional debut with Santa Clara in a 2013–14 Segunda Liga match against Moreirense.
