= Ponta Delgada Football Association =

Governing body for association football and futsal in Ponta Delgada

Football Association of Ponta Delgada
- Abbreviation: AF Ponta Delgada
- Formation: August 4, 1921; 105 years ago
- Type: NGO
- Legal status: Foundation
- Purpose: Football Association
- Headquarters: Avenida Natália Correia, 51 Fajã de Cima
- Location: Ponta Delgada (Azores), Portugal
- Region served: São Miguel, Santa Maria
- Official language: Portuguese
- General Secretary: José Manuel Almeida Medeiros
- President: Robert DaCamara
- Adjunt President: Helder Medeiros
- Vice-President: José Botelho
- Vice-President: Libério Câmara
- Main organ: General Assembly
- Parent organization: Portuguese Football Federation
- Website: afpd.fpf.pt
- Formerly called: Associação de Futebol de Ponta Delgada

The Ponta Delgada Football Association (Portuguese: Associação de Futebol de Ponta Delgada) is the governing body for association football and futsal competitions in the Portuguese former-district of Ponta Delgada. This organization regulates football in the Azorean islands of São Miguel and Santa Maria.

== History ==
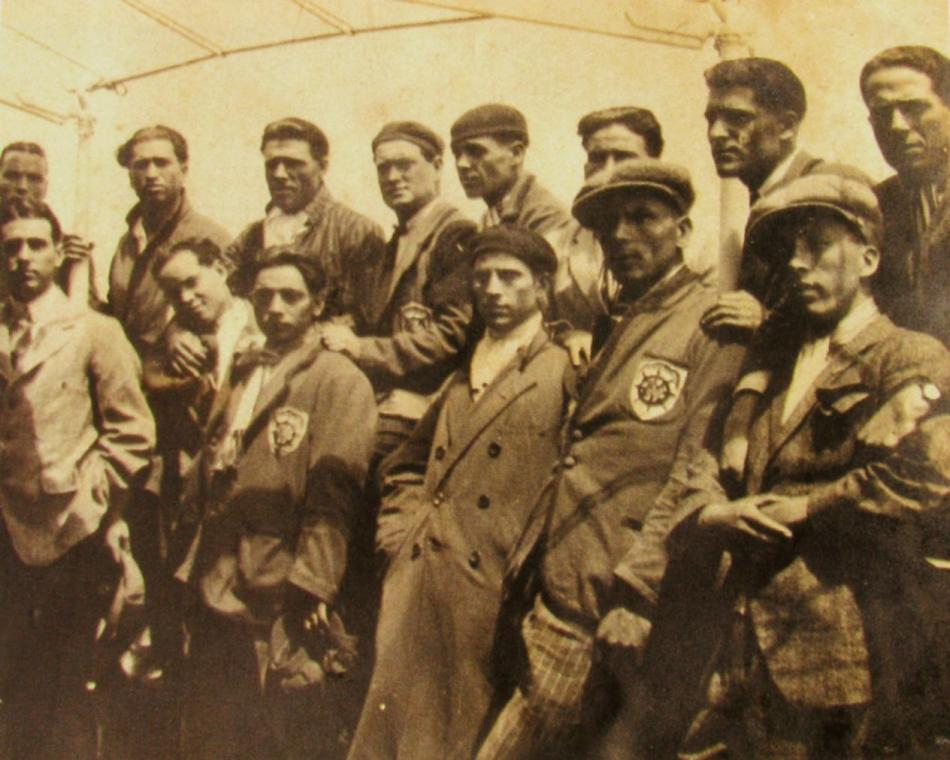
A committee from the Club Sport Marítimo on a visit to the island of São Miguel

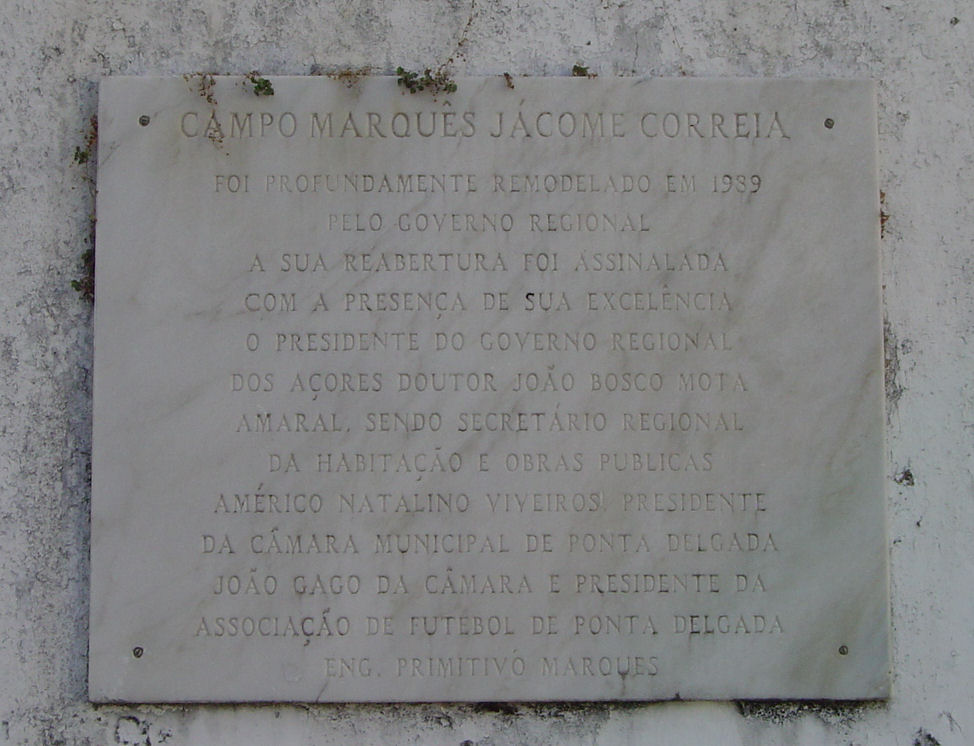
A plaque dedicated to the Marquess of Jácome Correia, a key supporter of socio-cultural activities of the island

The foundation of the Football Association began with the growth of many social and cultural institutes and organizations, unrelated to organized sport. One was the Ateneu Comercial de Ponta Delgada (Commercial Athenaeum of Ponta Delgada) at the edge of celebrating its first century of existence, and that inherited a voluminous and well-elaborated place in the society and culture. The Associação de Socorros Mútuos União e Trabalho which began in the last century, and helped to motivate public training, that formed schools, including one in Lagoa. The Sociedade Promotora de Instrução e Recreio (Society for the Promotion of Training and Recreation), who had a century of existence, but which eventually ceased, providing an important role in the social context, during the many festivals and cultural activities.

Within the Ateneu Comercial functioned the Associação Auxiliadora do Ensino Industrial e Comercial (Auxiliary Association of Commercial and Industrial Training) taught by professors António Maria Lopes (Portuguese) and Urbano de Arruda Carreiro (Accounting). Further, there was the commercial course of the Associação dos Empregados do Comércio e Indústria do Distrito Oriental dos Açores (Association of Commercial and Industrial Employees of the Eastern District of the Azores), which ended in the middle of the 20th century, when the Escola Industrial e Comercial de Ponta Delgada (Industrial and Commercial School of Ponta Delgada) began to operate, under the direction of Governaor Rafael Sérgio Vieira, at the Solar Jácome Correia (later site of the Roberto Ivens Secondary School).

At the beginning of the 20th century, the Liga Micaelense de Instrução Pública (Micalense League of Public Instruction) founded by Aires Jácome Correia, then Marquess of Jácome Correia, operated unnoticed, if not for the acts of the Ponta Delgada Cultural Institute. One of the two initiatives, that were generously financed, was the Escola Industrial de Rendas de Bilro (Industrial School of Rendas de Bilro), which survived, with the activities of female youth in the 1930s (along a building of Rua do Brum). Also around this time, at the end of 1911 and beginning of 192, was the celebrated Sociedade Promotora da Agricultura Micaelense (Promotional Society of Micalense Agriculture), with many meetings at the building along Alameda Duque de Bragança, seat of the Meteorological Observatory Afonso de Chaves for more than 50 years. Dating from 1843, this organization had its agricultural garden, that later were sold off to João Augusto Carreiro de Mendonça, along Rua Diário dos Açores, later the Banco Comercial dos Açores offices.

It was in the Sociedade Promotora da Agricultura Micaelense, Sociedade Promotora da Instrução e Recreio and the Sociedade dos Amigos das Letras e das Artes, founded in 1884 by António Feliciano de Castilho, that fomented the associative movement of São Miguel, managing several initiatives and, ultimately, founding other organizations, sport clubs and the need to form a football association in Ponta Delgada.

=== Football ===
A few Micalense educated in the United Kingdom, travelling on holiday, brought a football, and in 1898, formed two groups: one in red, and the other blue, facing-off in the pitch of the agricultural market of São Gonçalo. Both groups consisted of the early pioneers of football to the island: Rolando de Viveiros, Marquês de Jácome Correia, Weber Tavares, Edgardo Garcia and Alfredo Pinto, along with other locals, José de Carvalho, António Botelho da Câmara, José Morais Pereira, Padre James Machin (do Colégio Fisher), Raul Pregadeiro, Alberto Morais de Carvalho, Martiniano da Silva, Ernesto Pinto, Guilherme Machado de Faria e Maia, Manuel da Silva, Joaquim Correia e Silva, among others. Dr. Aristides Moreira da Mota, João de Morais Pereira and João José de Viveiros occupied the positions of leaders, thus stimulating, with the prestige of his name and his age, the sporting initiative.

At end of the 19th and early 20th century, the newspapers, and specifically the paper A Persusão, directed by Francisco Maria Supico, celebrated the achievements of several organizations. But, it was just after the First World War, that football began to be practiced regularly, such as the Mata do Doca, where stationed North American forces during the war could be found, increasing local commerce.

== Member clubs ==
Member clubs include:

- Clube Desportivo Santa Clara – Ponta Delgada – Primeira Liga
- Clube Operário Desportivo – Lagoa – Segunda II Divisão
- Capelense Sport Clube – Capelas – Terceira Divisão
- Clube União Micaelense – Ponta Delgada – Terceira Divisão
- Santiago Futebol Clube – Água de Pau – Terceira Divisão
- Sporting Clube Ideal – Ribeira Grande – Terceira Divisão
- Águia Clube Desportivo – Arrifes – District (Distritais)
- Clube Desportivo Rabo de Peixe – Rabo de Peixe – District (Distritais)
- Futebol Clube Vale Formoso – Furnas - - District (Distritais)
- Grupo Desportivo São Roque – Ponta Delgada – District (Distritais)
- Grupo Desportivo Bota Fogo – Ponta Garça – District (Distritais)
- Mira Mar Sport Clube -Povoação – District (Distritais)
- Vitória Clube do Pico da Pedra – Pico da Pedra – District (Distritais)
- União Desportiva do Nordeste – Nordeste – District (Distritais)
- Clube Desportivo Santo António – Ponta Delgada
- Clube Desportivo Santo António Nordestinho – Nordeste
- Maia Clube dos Açores – Maia, Ribeira Grande
- Marítimo Sport Clube – Ponta Delgada

== Current divisions - 2023–24 Season ==
The AF Ponta Delgada runs the following division covering the sixth tier of the Portuguese football league system.

- Águia Clube Desportivo
- Clube Desportivo Os Oliveirenses
- Santa Clara "B"
- Clube Desportivo Santo António
- Futebol Clube Vale Formoso
- Marítimo Sport Clube
- Santiago Futebol Clube
- Sporting Ideal
- Vasco Gama V.F. do Campo

== See also ==
- Portuguese District Football Associations
- Portuguese football competitions
- List of football clubs in Portugal
