= Pedro Pacheco (soccer, born 1984) =

Soccer player

Personal information
- Full name: Pedro Miguel Salgadinho Pacheco de Melo
- Date of birth: 27 June 1984 (age 42)
- Place of birth: Ponta Delgada, Portugal
- Height: 1.79 m (5 ft 10 in)
- Position: Defensive midfielder

Youth career
- 1995–2001: Santa Clara
- 2002: Vitória Pico

Senior career*
| Years | Team | Apps | (Gls) |
| 2002–2003 | Vitória Pico | 23 | (4) |
| 2003–2004 | Santa Clara | 2 | (0) |
| 2004–2005 | Lusitânia | 35 | (3) |
| 2005–2007 | Operário | 47 | (5) |
| 2007–2009 | Santa Clara | 44 | (1) |
| 2009–2010 | Nacional | 5 | (0) |
| 2010–2019 | Santa Clara | 274 | (18) |
| 2019–2020 | Ideal | 23 | (3) |
| 2020–2021 | Rabo de Peixe | 19 | (0) |
| 2021–2023 | Micaelense | 26 | (4) |
| Total | | 498 | (38) |

International career
| 2010–2014 | Canada | 18 | (0) |
- * Club domestic league appearances and goals

Pedro Miguel Salgadinho Pacheco de Melo (born 27 June 1984), known as Pacheco, is a former professional soccer player who played as a defensive midfielder.

He played 312 games in the Segunda Liga over 11 seasons, mainly at the service of Santa Clara (19 goals). In the Primeira Liga, he appeared for that club as well as Nacional.

Born in Portugal, Pacheco was a Canadian international, earning 18 caps in four years.

== Club career ==
Born in Ponta Delgada, São Miguel Island, Azores to Portuguese parents, Pacheco began his senior career in the regional leagues, playing with Vitória Pico da Pedra. In the following year he moved to arguably the biggest club in the territory, C.D. Santa Clara, but appeared in only two Segunda Liga matches in the 2003–04 campaign.

After three seasons in the third division with two sides from his native region (S.C. Lusitânia and CD Operário), Pacheco returned to Santa Clara who still competed in the second tier, and began featuring regularly for the first team, starting a total of 26 games over the course of two seasons.

In the last minute of the 2009 August transfer window, Pacheco moved to the island of Madeira, signing with C.D. Nacional. He made his Primeira Liga debut on 5 October, playing one minute in the 2–0 home win against Vitória de Guimarães, but could only make eight competitive appearances in his first year (two in the Taça da Liga and one in the UEFA Europa League – 15 minutes of the 5–1 home victory over FK Austria Wien in the group stage).

Pacheco returned to Santa Clara in the summer of 2010, being immediately appointed captain by manager Bruno Moura. In early June 2013, having finished the second-division campaign with four goals in 37 games, he signed a contract extension with the club.

In August 2019, after nine years at the Estádio de São Miguel and 361 official matches, the 35-year-old Pacheco left and joined S.C. Ideal of the Portuguese third tier. He spent the following season with C.D. Rabo de Peixe in the same league.

Pacheco announced his retirement on 14 August 2023.

== International career ==
Pacheco opted to represent Canada internationally, having obtained a Canadian passport through his parents. On 14 May 2010, he was picked for the friendlies against Argentina and Venezuela; after playing six minutes from the bench in the first game (a 5–0 loss), he started on the 1–1 draw on the 29th.

On 27 June 2013, Pacheco was listed as part of the confirmed 23-man squad for Colin Miller's Canada squad for that year's CONCACAF Gold Cup, making it his second consecutive tournament.
