= UD Nordeste =

Portuguese football club

- Full name: União Desportiva do Nordeste
- Founded: 1964
- Ground: Estádio Municipal de Nordeste; Nordeste, Azores; Portugal
- Capacity: 2,000
- Chairman: Luís Raposo Lima
- League: AF Ponta Delgada 1ª Divisão
Home colours

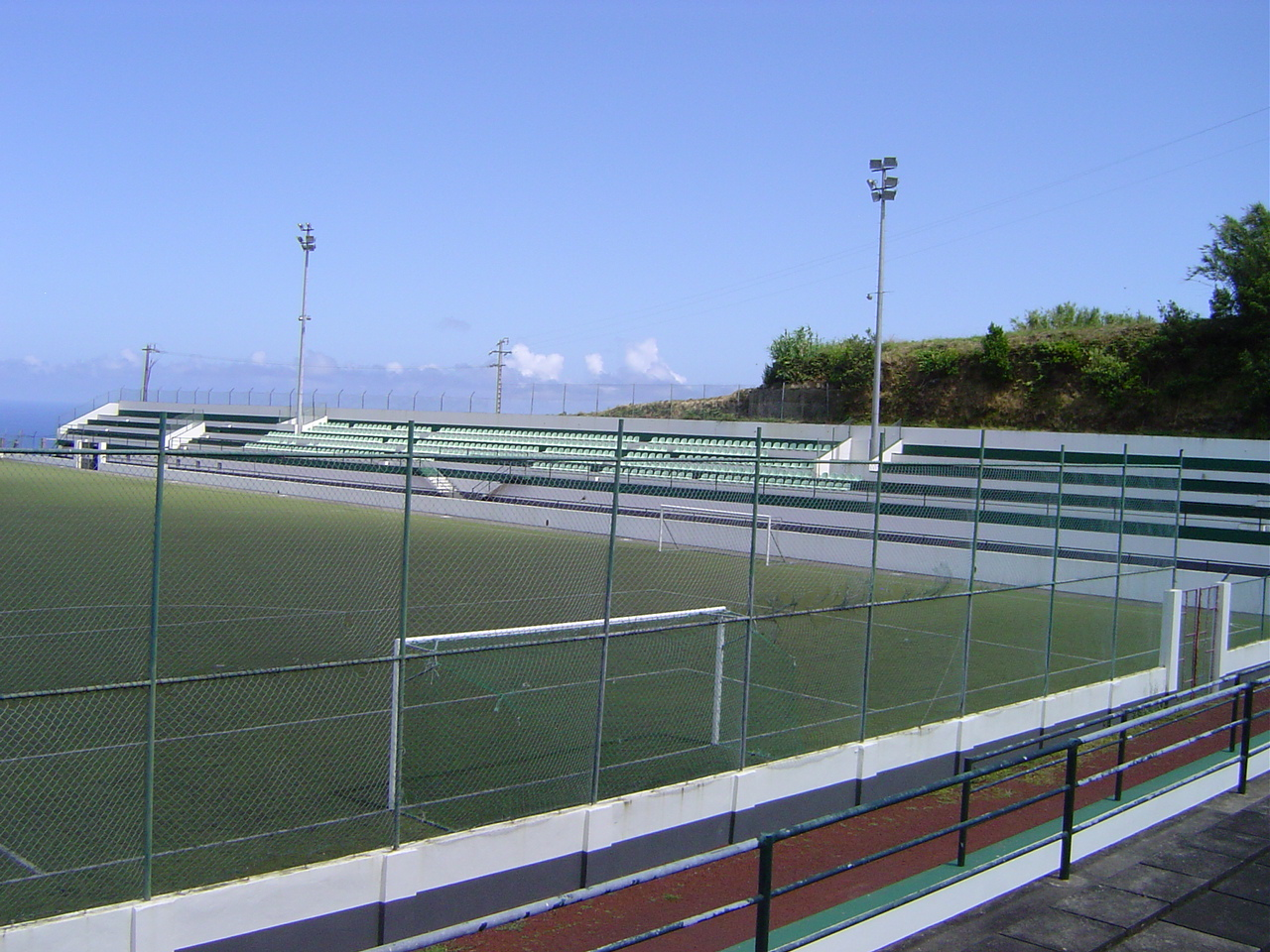
The Estádio Municipal de Nordeste.

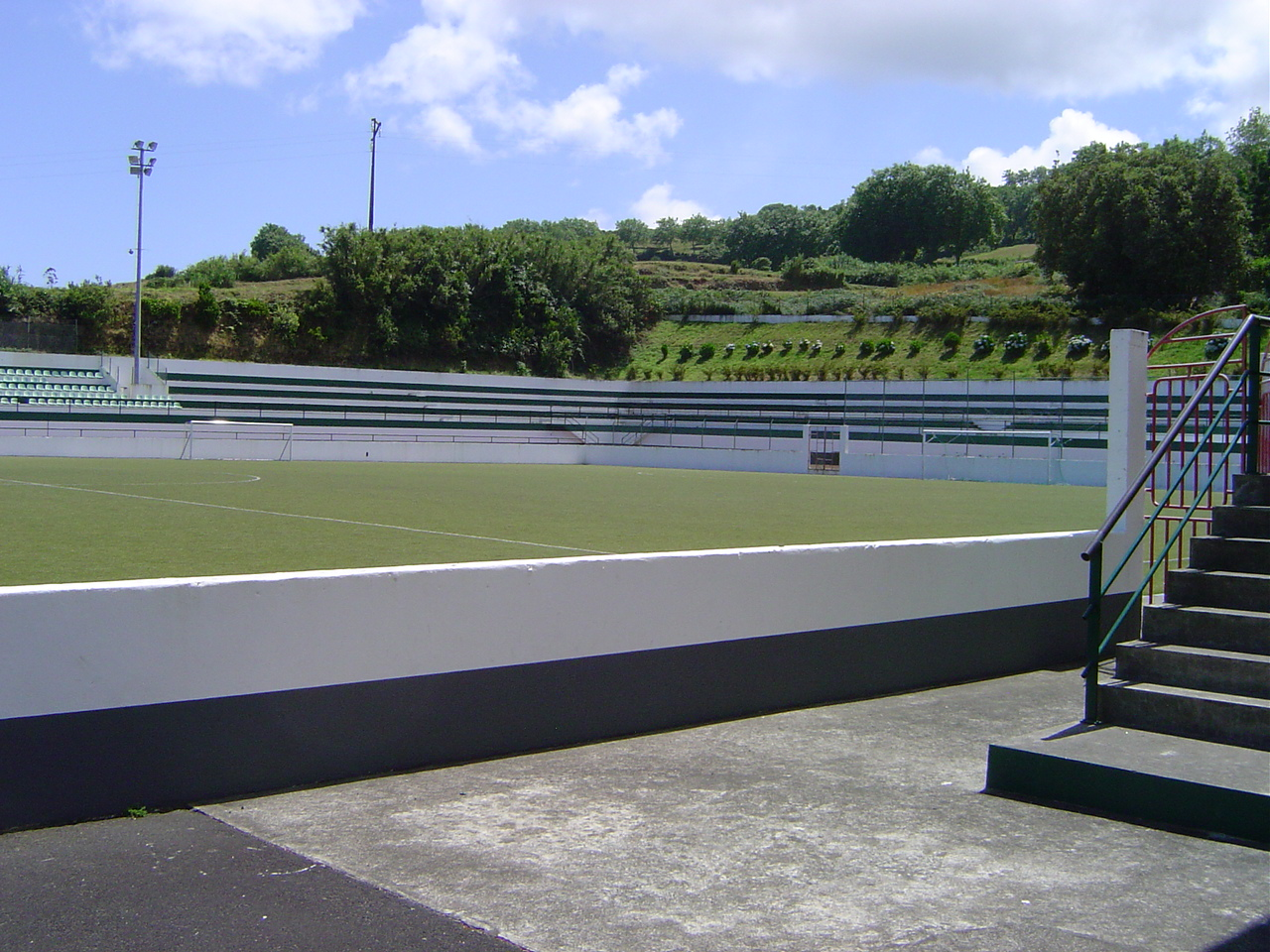
Rural surroundings to the west of the stadium.

União Desportiva do Nordeste (known as UD Nordeste or U. Nordeste), is a Portuguese football club based in Nordeste on the island of São Miguel in the Azores.

== Background ==
UD Nordeste currently plays in the AF Ponta Delgada 1ª Divisão (known as the Campeonato de S. Miguel) which is the fifth tier of Portuguese football. The club was founded in 1964 and they play their home matches at the Estádio Municipal de Nordeste in Nordeste. The stadium is able to accommodate 2,000 spectators.

The club is affiliated to Associação de Futebol de Ponta Delgada and has competed in the AF Ponta Delgada Taça. The club has also entered the national cup competition known as Taça de Portugal on one occasion, losing on penalties at home to Fayal SC on 3 September 2006.

== Season to season ==
Season	Level	Division	Section	Place	Movements
1990–91	Tier 6	Distritais	AF Ponta Delgada - 2ª Divisão		
1991–92	Tier 6	Distritais	AF Ponta Delgada - 2ª Divisão		
1992–93	Tier 6	Distritais	AF Ponta Delgada - 2ª Divisão		Promoted
1993–94	Tier 5	Distritais	AF Ponta Delgada - 1ª Divisão		
1994–95	Tier 5	Distritais	AF Ponta Delgada - 1ª Divisão		
1995–96	Tier 5	Distritais	AF Ponta Delgada - 1ª Divisão		
1996–97	Tier 5	Distritais	AF Ponta Delgada - 1ª Divisão		
1997–98	Tier 5	Distritais	AF Ponta Delgada - 1ª Divisão		
1998–99	Tier 5	Distritais	AF Ponta Delgada - 1ª Divisão	3rd	
1999–2000	Tier 5	Distritais	AF Ponta Delgada - 1ª Divisão		
2000–01	Tier 5	Distritais	AF Ponta Delgada - 1ª Divisão	10th	
2001–02	Tier 5	Distritais	AF Ponta Delgada - 1ª Divisão		
2002–03		Inactive			
2003–04		Inactive			
2004–05	Tier 5	Distritais	AF Ponta Delgada - 1ª Divisão		
2005–06	Tier 5	Distritais	AF Ponta Delgada - 1ª Divisão		
2006–07	Tier 5	Distritais	AF Ponta Delgada - 1ª Divisão		
2007–08		Inactive			
2008–09	Tier 5	Distritais	AF Ponta Delgada - 1ª Divisão	7th	
2009–10		Inactive			
2010–11	Tier 5	Distritais	AF Ponta Delgada - 1ª Divisão	8th	
2011–12	Tier 5	Distritais	AF Ponta Delgada - 1ª Divisão	5th	

== Gallery ==
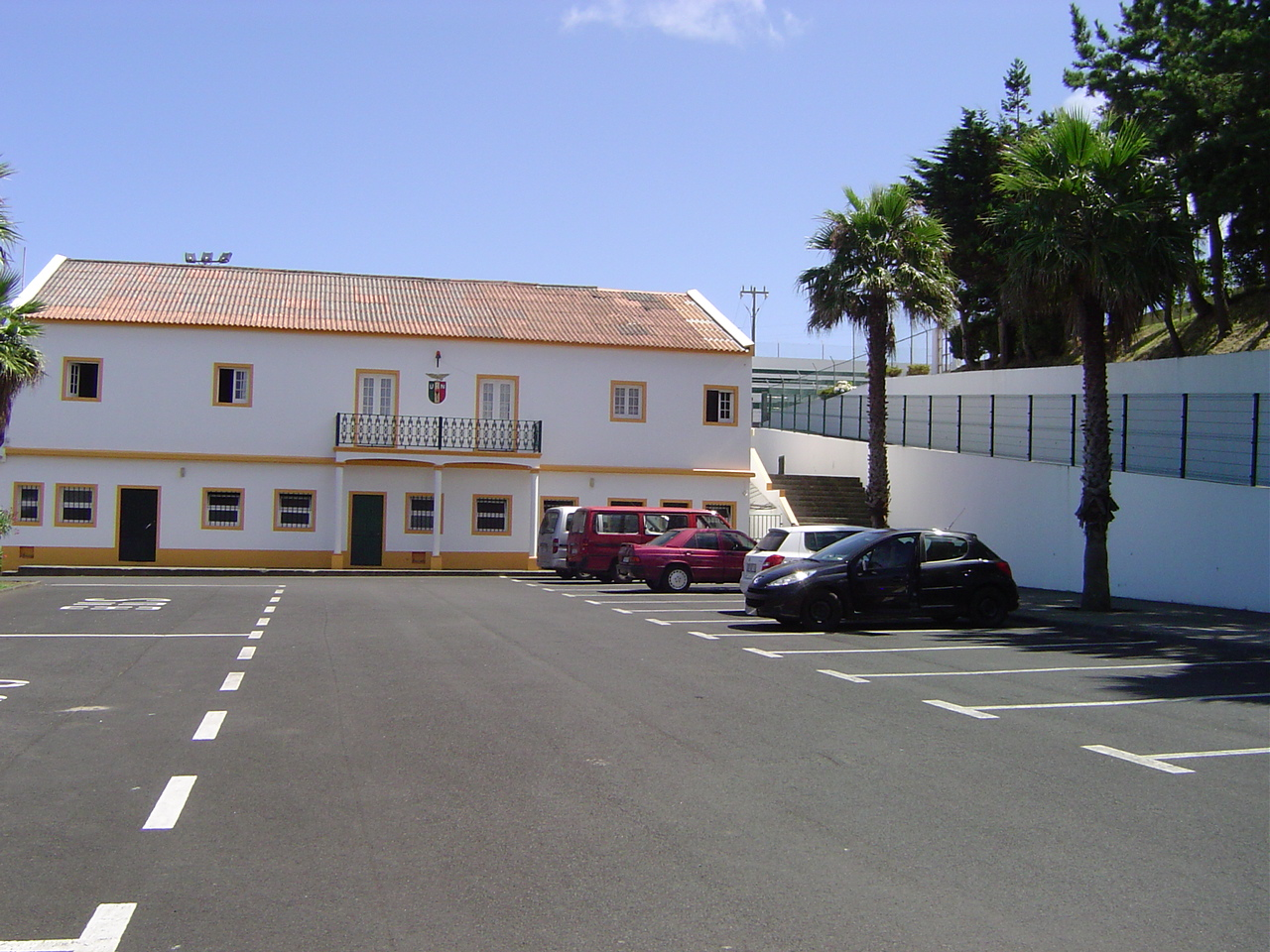
Clubhouse

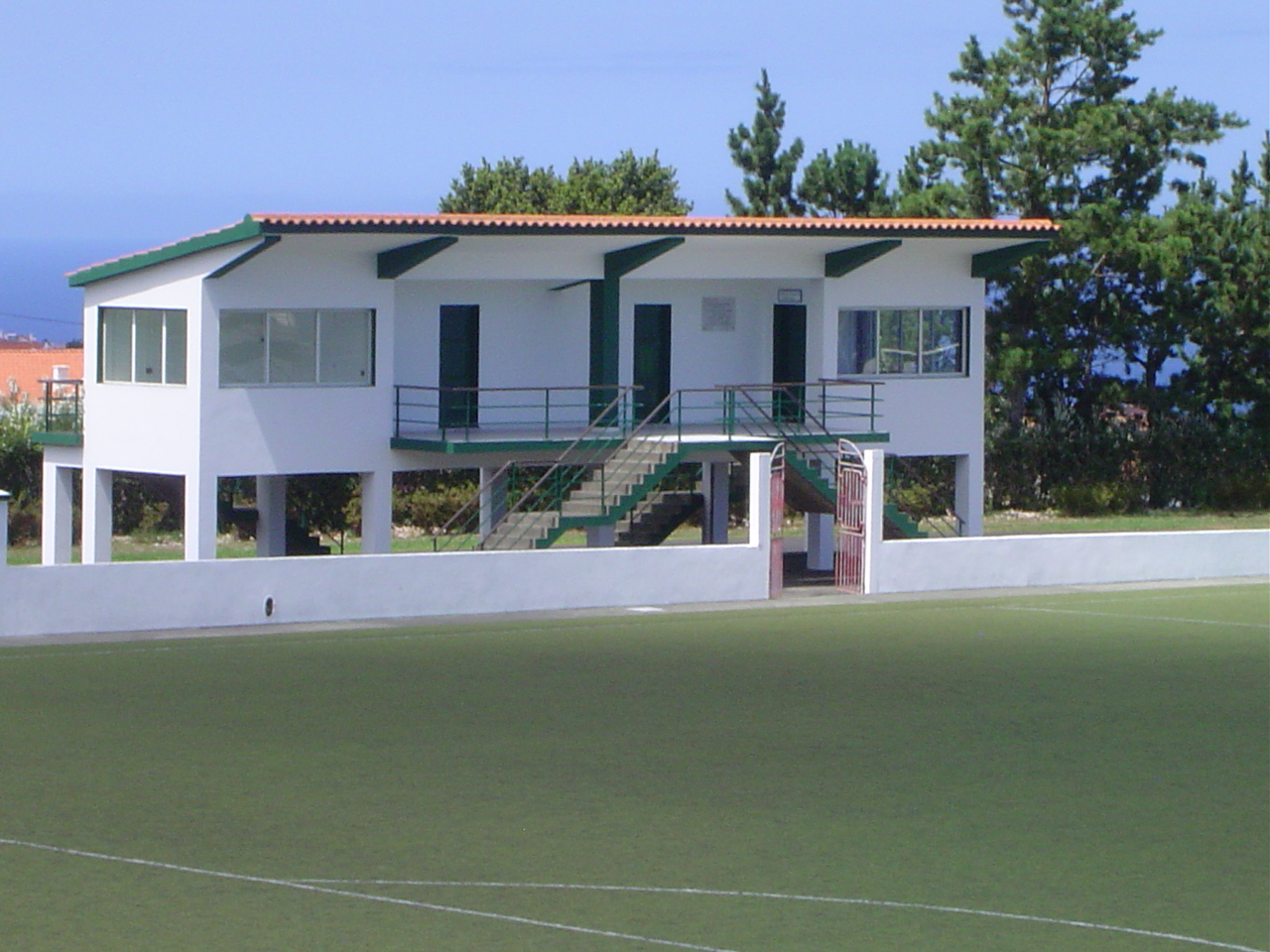
Administration block

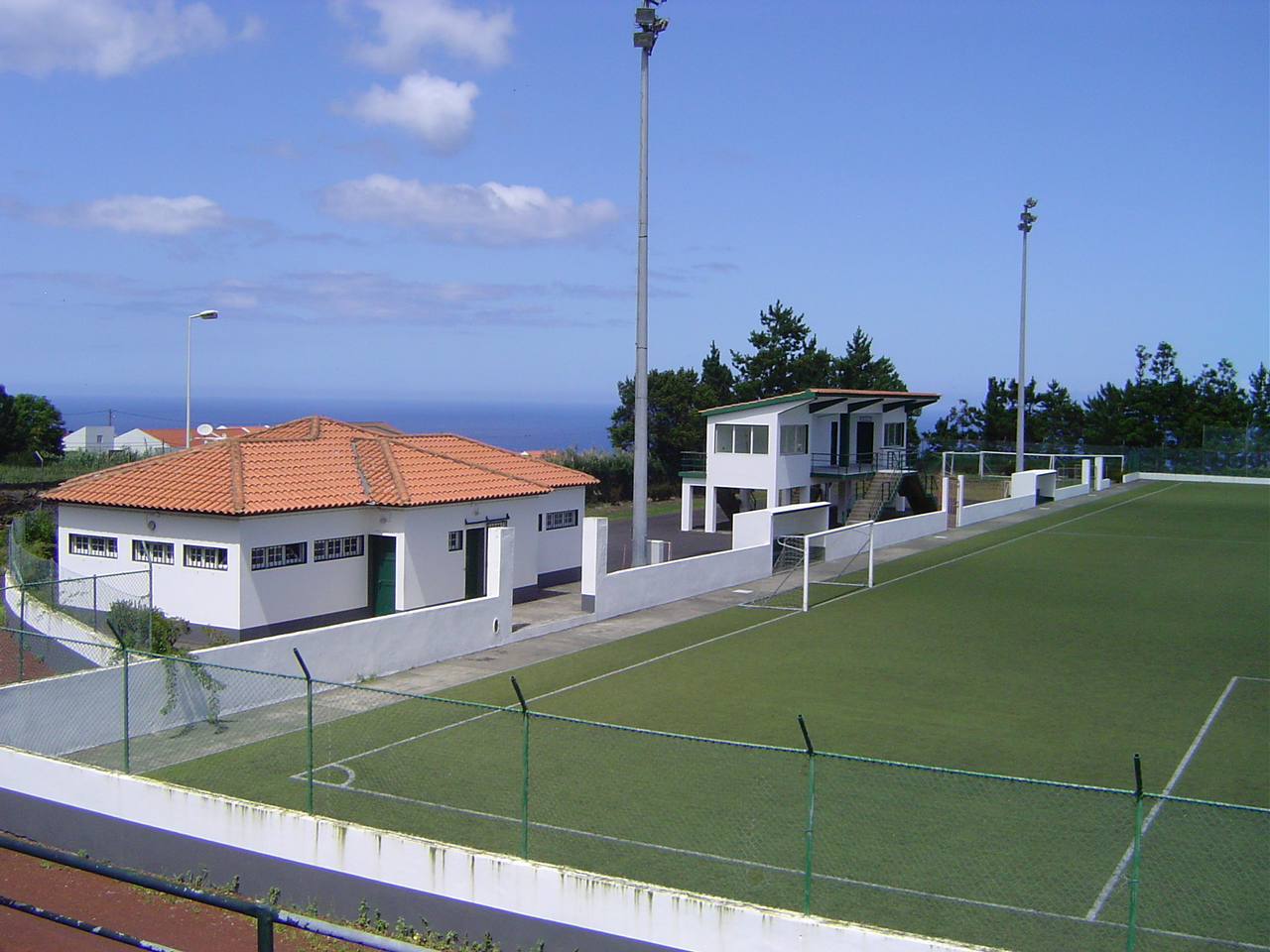
Clubhouse and dugouts

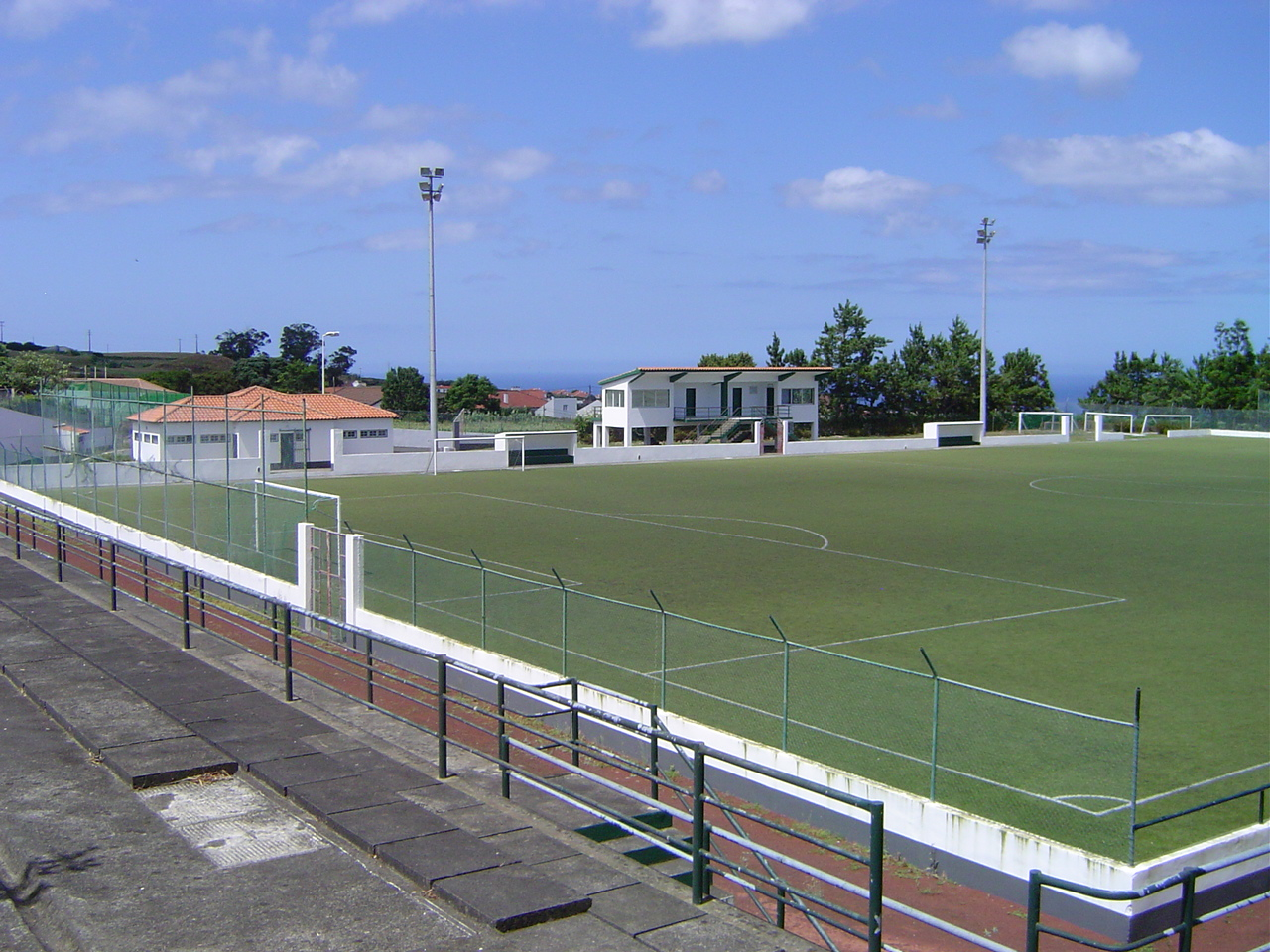
Northern view

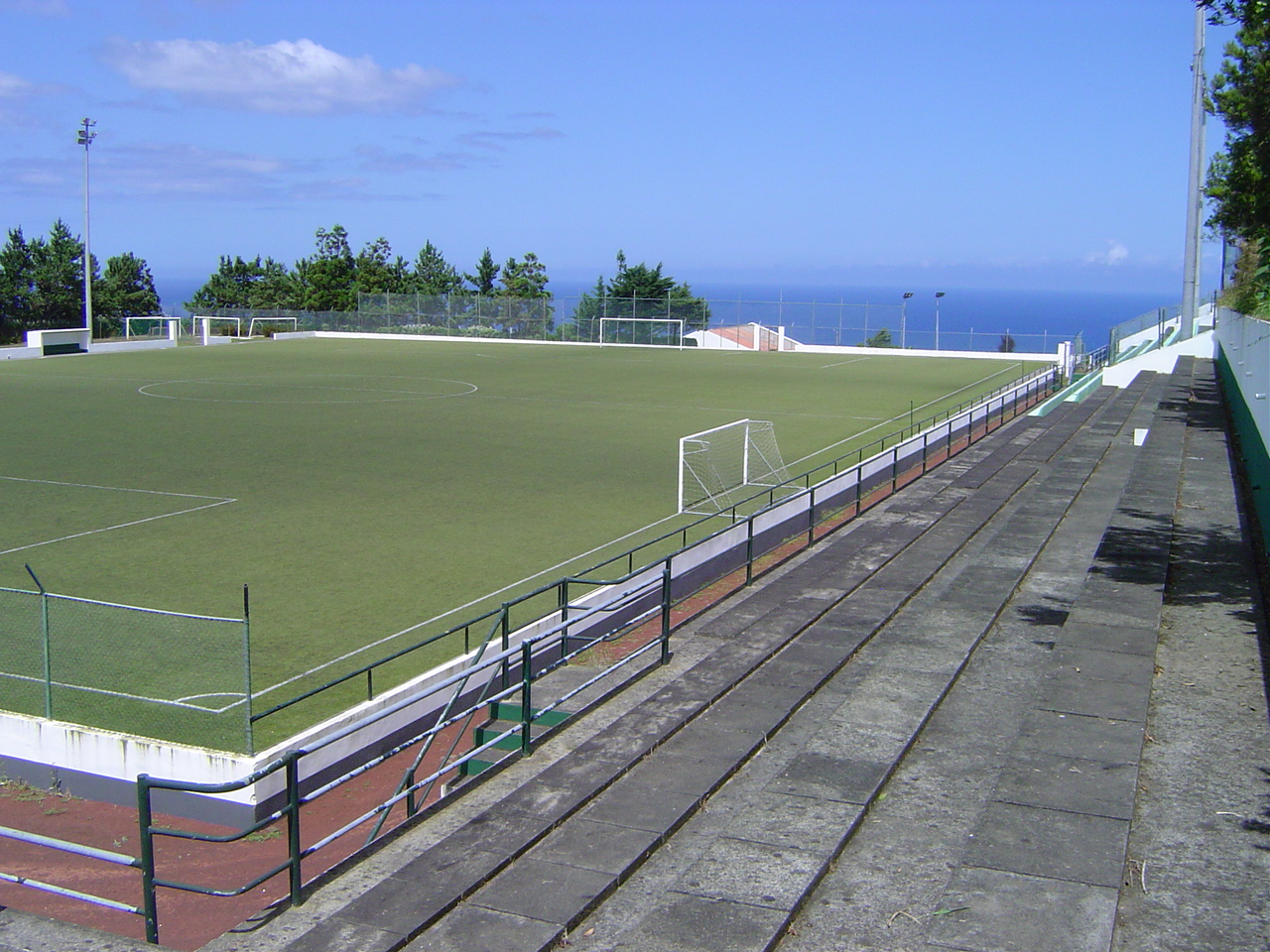
Eastern view
