= Viveiros =

Viveiros is a surname. Notable people with the surname include:

- Camilo Viveiros, American political activist
- Craig Viveiros, British/Portuguese television and film director
- Eduardo Viveiros de Castro (born 1951), Brazilian anthropologist
- Emanuel Viveiros (born 1966), Canadian ice hockey player
- Hugo Viveiros (born 1995), Portuguese footballer
- Mateus Viveiros (born 1998), Brazilian footballer
- Nuno Viveiros (born 1983), Portuguese footballer

== See also ==
- Bernie DeViveiros
