= Milheirós =

Milheirós may refer to the following places in Portugal:

- Milheirós (Maia), a parish in the municipality of Maia
- Milheirós de Poiares, a parish in the municipality of Santa Maria da Feira
