= Mira Mar SC =

Portuguese football club

Mira Mar
- Full name: Mira Mar Sport Clube
- Founded: 1935
- Ground: Complexo Desportivo Municipal da Povoação; Povoação, Azores; Portugal
- Capacity: 1,000
- Chairman: Norberto Pimentel Araújo
- League: AF Ponta Delgada 1ª Divisão
Home colours

Mira Mar Sport Clube (known as Mira Mar SC or Mira Mar), is a Portuguese football club based in Povoação on the island of São Miguel in the Azores.

== Background ==
Mira Mar SC currently plays in the AF Ponta Delgada 1ª Divisão (known as the Campeonato de S. Miguel) which is the fifth tier of Portuguese football. The club was founded in 1935 and they play their home matches at the Complexo Desportivo Municipal da Povoação in Povoação. The stadium is able to accommodate 1,000 spectators.

The club is affiliated to Associação de Futebol de Ponta Delgada and has competed in the AF Ponta Delgada Taça. The club has also entered the national cup competition known as Taça de Portugal on a few occasions.

== Season to season ==
Season	Level	Division	Section	Place	Movements
1990–91	Tier 5	Distritais	AF Ponta Delgada - 1ª Divisão		
1991–92 São Miguel Champion	Tier 5	Distritais	AF Ponta Delgada - 1ª Divisão	1st São Miguel Champion	
1992–93 Azores Champion	Tier 5	Distritais	AF Ponta Delgada - 1ª Divisão	1st São Miguel Champion and Azores Champion	Promoted
1993–94	Tier 4	Terceira Divisão	Série E	14th	
1994–95	Tier 4	Terceira Divisão	Série E	16th	
1995–96	Tier 4	Terceira Divisão	Série Açores - 1ª Fase	5th	Promotion Group
	Tier 4	Terceira Divisão	Série Açores Primeiros	5th	
1996–97	Tier 4	Terceira Divisão	Série Açores - 1ª Fase	5th	Promotion Group
	Tier 4	Terceira Divisão	Série Açores Primeiros	5th	
1997–98	Tier 4	Terceira Divisão	Série Açores - 1ª Fase	9th	Relegation Group
	Tier 4	Terceira Divisão	Série Açores Últimos	5th	Relegated
1998–99		Inactive			
1999–2000	Tier 5	Distritais	AF Ponta Delgada - 1ª Divisão		
2000–01	Tier 5	Distritais	AF Ponta Delgada - 1ª Divisão	5th	
2001–02	Tier 5	Distritais	AF Ponta Delgada - 1ª Divisão		
2002–03	Tier 5	Distritais	AF Ponta Delgada - 1ª Divisão	1st	Promoted
2003–4	Tier 4	Terceira Divisão	Série Açores - 1ª Fase	8th	Relegation Group
	Tier 4	Terceira Divisão	Série Açores Últimos	5th	Relegated
2004–05	Tier 5	Distritais	AF Ponta Delgada - 1ª Divisão		
2005–06	Tier 5	Distritais	AF Ponta Delgada - 1ª Divisão		
2006–07	Tier 5	Distritais	AF Ponta Delgada - 1ª Divisão		
2007–08	Tier 5	Distritais	AF Ponta Delgada - 1ª Divisão	4th	
2008–09	Tier 5	Distritais	AF Ponta Delgada - 1ª Divisão	4th	
2009–10	Tier 5	Distritais	AF Ponta Delgada - 1ª Divisão	2nd	
2010–11	Tier 5	Distritais	AF Ponta Delgada - 1ª Divisão	5th	
2011–12	Tier 5	Distritais	AF Ponta Delgada - 1ª Divisão	8th	

== Honours ==
- AF Ponta Delgada Taça Primavera
  - Winners (1): 2010–11
