= Capelense SC =

Portuguese football club

Capelense
- Full name: Capelense Sport Clube
- Founded: 1922
- Ground: Campo Municipal Jâcome Correia; Ponta Delgada, Azores; Portugal
- Capacity: 1,500
- Chairman: Domingos Pereira da Silva
- League: AF Ponta Delgada 1ª Divisão
Home colours

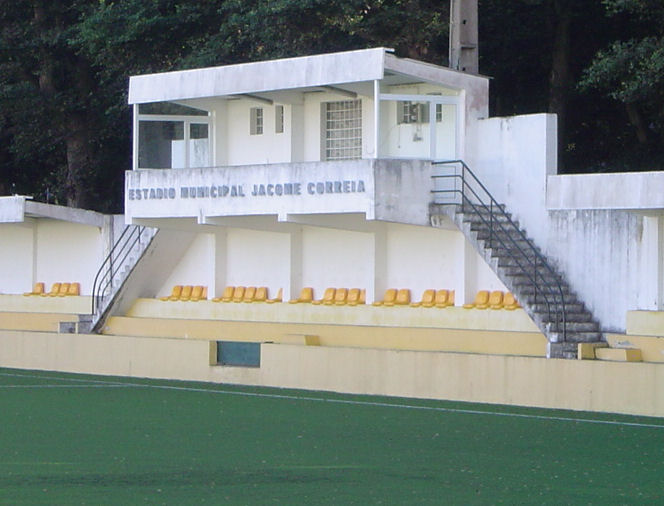
The administration block of Campo Municipal Jâcome Correia

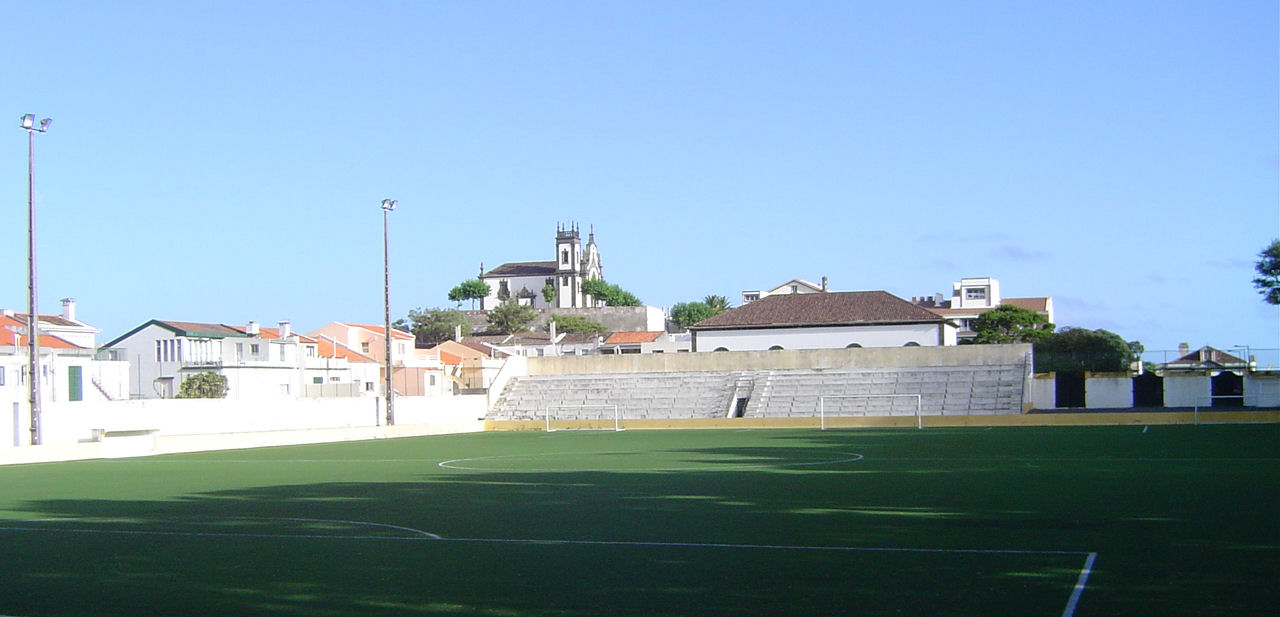
Setting of the stadium in Ponta Delgada

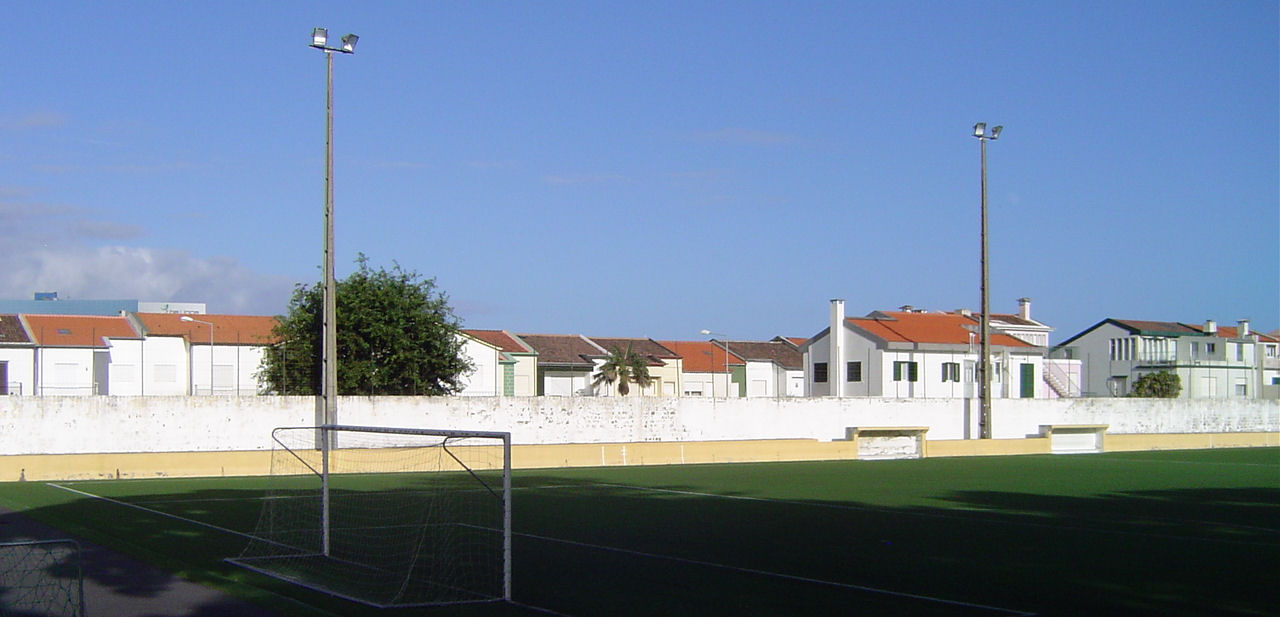
Eastern view of the ground

Capelense Sport Clube (known as Capelense SC or Capelense), is a Portuguese football club based in Capelas on the island of São Miguel in the Azores.

== Background ==
Capelense SC currently plays in the AF Ponta Delgada 1ª Divisão (known as the Campeonato de S. Miguel) which is the fifth tier of Portuguese football. The club was founded in 1922 and they currently play their home matches at the Campo Municipal Jâcome Correia in Ponta Delgada. The stadium is able to accommodate 1,500 spectators. The club's home ground on the seafront at Capelas is under development, the layout of the stadium having been re-positioned leaving part of the existing structure in a derelict condition.

The club is affiliated to Associação de Futebol de Ponta Delgada and has competed in the AF Ponta Delgada Taça. The club has also entered the national cup competition known as Taça de Portugal on a few occasions.

== Season to season ==
Season	Level	Division	Section	Place	Movements
1990–91	Tier 6	Distritais	AF Ponta Delgada - 2ª Divisão		
1991–92	Tier 6	Distritais	AF Ponta Delgada - 2ª Divisão		Promoted
1992–93	Tier 5	Distritais	AF Ponta Delgada - 1ª Divisão		Relegated
1993–94	Tier 6	Distritais	AF Ponta Delgada - 2ª Divisão		Promoted
1994–95	Tier 5	Distritais	AF Ponta Delgada - 1ª Divisão		
1995–96	Tier 5	Distritais	AF Ponta Delgada - 1ª Divisão		
1996–97	Tier 5	Distritais	AF Ponta Delgada - 1ª Divisão		
1997–98	Tier 5	Distritais	AF Ponta Delgada - 1ª Divisão		
1998–99	Tier 5	Distritais	AF Ponta Delgada - 1ª Divisão	4th	
1999–2000	Tier 5	Distritais	AF Ponta Delgada - 1ª Divisão		
2000–01	Tier 5	Distritais	AF Ponta Delgada - 1ª Divisão	8th	
2001–02	Tier 5	Distritais	AF Ponta Delgada - 1ª Divisão		
2002–03	Tier 5	Distritais	AF Ponta Delgada - 1ª Divisão	6th	
2003–04	Tier 5	Distritais	AF Ponta Delgada - 1ª Divisão	1st	Promoted
2004–05	Tier 4	Terceira Divisão	Série Açores - 1ª Fase	8th	Relegation Group
	Tier 4	Terceira Divisão	Série Açores Últimos	3rd	Relegated
2005–06	Tier 5	Distritais	AF Ponta Delgada - 1ª Divisão		
2006–07	Tier 5	Distritais	AF Ponta Delgada - 1ª Divisão	1st	Promoted
2007–08	Tier 4	Terceira Divisão	Série Açores - 1ª Fase	3rd	Promotion Group
	Tier 4	Terceira Divisão	Série Açores Primeiros	3rd	
2008–09	Tier 4	Terceira Divisão	Série Açores - 1ª Fase	4th	Promotion Group
	Tier 4	Terceira Divisão	Série Açores Primeiros	5th	
2009–10	Tier 4	Terceira Divisão	Série Açores - 1ª Fase	2nd	Promotion Group
	Tier 4	Terceira Divisão	Série Açores Primeiros	4th	
2010–11	Tier 4	Terceira Divisão	Série Açores - 1ª Fase	9th	Relegation Group
	Tier 4	Terceira Divisão	Série Açores Últimos	5th	Relegated
2011–12	Tier 5	Distritais	AF Ponta Delgada - 1ª Divisão	3rd	

== Honours ==
- AF Ponta Delgada 1ª Divisão – Campeonato de S. Miguel
  - Champions (2): 2003–04, 2006–07
