= Vitória Pico da Pedra =

Portuguese football club

Vitória P. Pedra
- Full name: Vitória Clube do Pico da Pedra
- Founded: 1992
- Ground: Estádio José da Silva Calisto; Pico da Pedra, Azores; Portugal
- Capacity: 2,000
- Chairman: Ricardo Estrela
- League: AF Ponta Delgada 1ª Divisão

Vitória Clube do Pico da Pedra (known as Vitória Pico da Pedra or Vitória P. Pedra), is a Portuguese football club based in Pico da Pedra on the island of São Miguel in the Azores.

== Background ==
Vitória Pico Pedra currently plays in the AF Ponta Delgada 1ª Divisão (known as the Campeonato de S. Miguel) which is the fifth tier of Portuguese football. The club was founded in 1992 and they play their home matches at the Estádio José da Silva Calisto in Pico da Pedra. The stadium is able to accommodate 2,000 spectators.

The club is affiliated to Associação de Futebol de Ponta Delgada and has competed in the AF Ponta Delgada Taça. The club has also entered the national cup competition known as Taça de Portugal in 2002/03 winning away 2–1 to Angústias Atlético before going out 5–0 away to CD Mafra.

== Season to season ==
Season	Level	Division	Section	Place	Movements
1996–97	Tier 5	Distritais	AF Ponta Delgada – 1ª Divisão		
1997–98	Tier 5	Distritais	AF Ponta Delgada – 1ª Divisão		
1998–99	Tier 5	Distritais	AF Ponta Delgada – 1ª Divisão	11th	
1999–2000	Tier 5	Distritais	AF Ponta Delgada – 1ª Divisão		
2000–01	Tier 5	Distritais	AF Ponta Delgada – 1ª Divisão	2nd	
2001–02	Tier 5	Distritais	AF Ponta Delgada – 1ª Divisão		
2002–03	Tier 5	Distritais	AF Ponta Delgada – 1ª Divisão	3rd	
2003–04	Tier 5	Distritais	AF Ponta Delgada – 1ª Divisão	5th	
2004–05	Tier 5	Distritais	AF Ponta Delgada – 1ª Divisão		
2005–06	Tier 5	Distritais	AF Ponta Delgada – 1ª Divisão		
2006–07	Tier 5	Distritais	AF Ponta Delgada – 1ª Divisão		
2007–08	Tier 5	Distritais	AF Ponta Delgada – 1ª Divisão	5th	
2008–09	Tier 5	Distritais	AF Ponta Delgada – 1ª Divisão	3rd	
2009–10	Tier 5	Distritais	AF Ponta Delgada – 1ª Divisão	3rd	
2010–11	Tier 5	Distritais	AF Ponta Delgada – 1ª Divisão	4th	
2011–12		Inactive			

== Honours ==
- AF Ponta Delgada Taça de Honra: 2009/10
- AF Ponta Delgada S. Miguel: 2007/08
