= Fayal S.C. =

Portuguese sports club

- Full name: Fayal Sport Club
- Founded: 1909
- Ground: Estádio da Alagoa, Horta
- Capacity: 3000
- League: Azores
- 2020–21: 10th

Fayal Sport Club is a Portuguese sports club from Horta, Azores.

The men's football team plays in the district league. The team enjoyed spells in the Terceira Divisão in 1997–98, 1999–2000, 2001–02, 2006 to 2008 and 2011–12. The team also contested the Taça de Portugal during these years.
