= CA Mirandense =

Portuguese sports club

- Full name: Clube Atlético Mirandense
- Founded: 1947
- Ground: Miranda do Corvo
- League: I Séria A AF Coimbra
- 2020–21: 9th

Clube Atlético Mirandense is a Portuguese sports club from Miranda do Corvo.

The men's football team plays in the I Séria A AF Coimbra. The team was promoted from the Terceira Divisão to the old third tier in Portugal, the 1990–91 Segunda Divisão B. After being relegated from the 1991–92 Segunda Divisão B the club played in the Terceira Divisão again. A stint in the third-tier 2006–07 Segunda Divisão followed, before two straight relegations from that and from the 2007–08 Terceira Divisão.
