= Milheirós de Poiares =

Civil parish in Portugal

- Civil parish
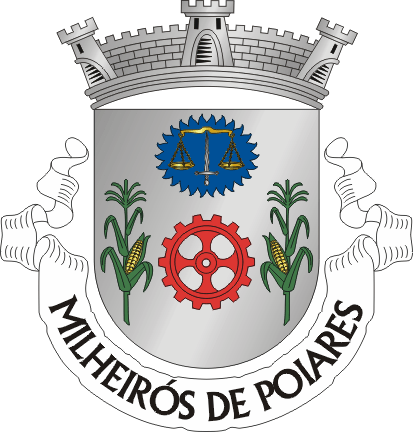
- Coat of arms

- Location in Portugal
- Coordinates: 40.919°N 8.477°W
- Country: Portugal
- Region: Norte
- Metropolitan area: Porto
- District: Aveiro
- Municipality: Santa Maria da Feira

Area
  - Total: 7.87 km^{2} (3.04 sq mi)

Population (2011)
  - Total: 3,791
  - Density: 480/km^{2} (1,200/sq mi)
- Time zone: UTC+00:00 (WET)
  - Summer (DST): UTC+01:00 (WEST)

Milheirós de Poiares is a Portuguese parish, located in the municipality of Santa Maria da Feira. The population in 2011 was 3,791, in an area of 7.87 km^{2}.

== Landmarks ==
- Quinta do Seixal

== Football (soccer) clubs ==
- Grupo Desportivo Milheiroense
