= AD Fazendense =

Portuguese sports club

- Full name: Associação Desportiva Fazendense
- Founded: 1978
- Ground: Estadio Dr. Jose Sousa Gomes, Fazendas de Almeirim
- Capacity: 2500
- League: Honra AF Santarém
- 2020–21: 8th

Associação Desportiva Fazendense is a Portuguese sports club from Fazendas de Almeirim.

The men's football team plays in the Honra AF Santarém. The team played on the Portuguese fourth tier, the Terceira Divisão, from 1996 to 2005 and then again in 2007–08. The team also contested the Taça de Portugal.
