= C.D. Rabo de Peixe =

Portuguese football club

Rabo de Peixe
- Full name: Clube Desportivo Rabo de Peixe
- Founded: 1985
- Ground: Campo de Jogos Bom Jesus; Rabo de Peixe, Ribeira Grande, Azores; Portugal
- Capacity: 2,500
- Chairman: Jaime Luis Vieira
- League: Campeonato de Portugal
- 2021–22: 2nd, Serie J relegation group
Home colours	Away colours	Third colours

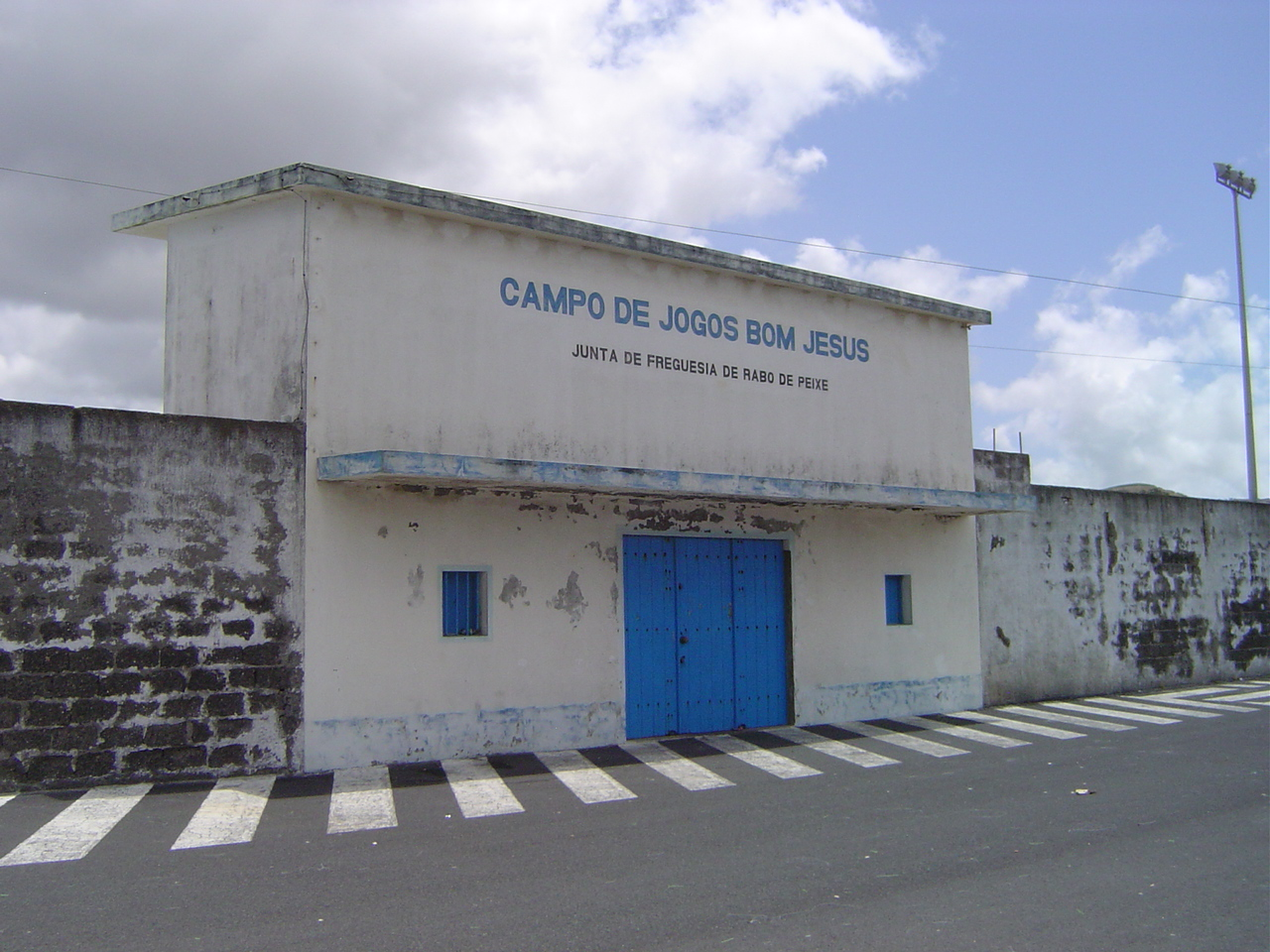
The administration block of Campo de Jogos Bom Jesus

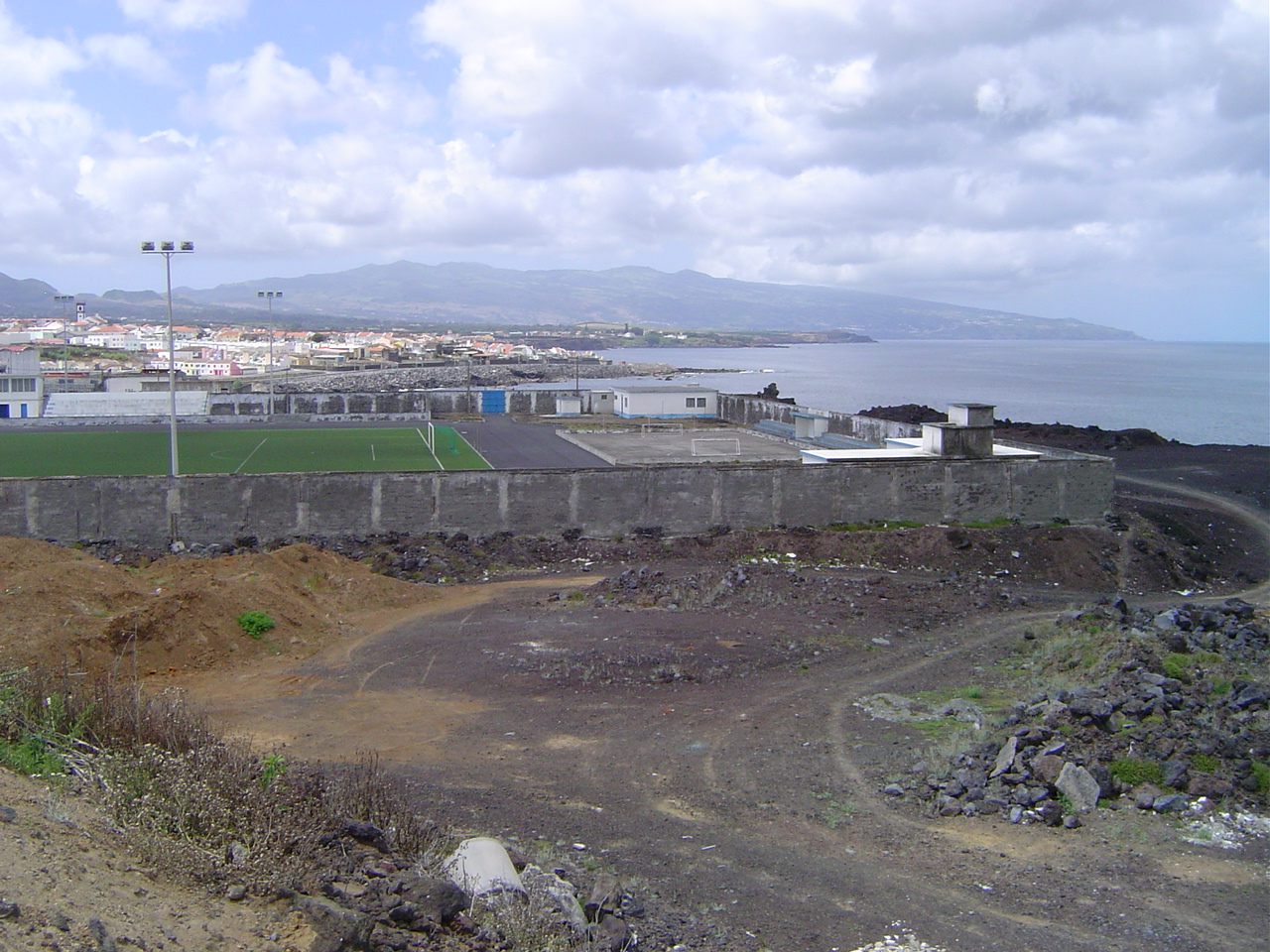
The football ground is situated within a degraded seafront location

Clube Desportivo Rabo de Peixe (known as CD Rabo de Peixe or Rabo de Peixe), is a Portuguese football club based in Rabo de Peixe, Ribeira Grande on the island of São Miguel in the Azores.

== Background ==
CD Rabo de Peixe currently plays in the Campeonato de Portugal which is the fourth tier of Portuguese football. The club was founded in 1985 and they play their home matches at the Campo de Jogos Bom Jesus in Rabo de Peixe, Ribeira Grande. The stadium is able to accommodate 2,500 spectators.

The club is affiliated to Associação de Futebol de Ponta Delgada and has competed in the AF Ponta Delgada Taça. The club has also entered the national cup competition known as Taça de Portugal on a few occasions.

== Season to season ==
Season	Level	Division	Section	Place	Movements
1990–91	Tier 5	Distritais	AF Ponta Delgada - 1ª Divisão		
1991–92	Tier 5	Distritais	AF Ponta Delgada - 1ª Divisão		
1992–93	Tier 6	Distritais	AF Ponta Delgada - 2ª Divisão		
1993–94	Tier 5	Distritais	AF Ponta Delgada - 1ª Divisão		
1994–95		Inactive			
1995–96		Inactive			
1996–97		Inactive			
1997–98		Inactive			
1998–99		Inactive			
1999–2000		Inactive			
2000–01	Tier 5	Distritais	AF Ponta Delgada - 1ª Divisão	9th	
2001–02	Tier 5	Distritais	AF Ponta Delgada - 1ª Divisão		
2002–03	Tier 5	Distritais	AF Ponta Delgada - 1ª Divisão	4th	
2003–04	Tier 5	Distritais	AF Ponta Delgada - 1ª Divisão	2nd	
2004–05	Tier 5	Distritais	AF Ponta Delgada - 1ª Divisão	1st	Promoted
2005–06	Tier 4	Terceira Divisão	Série Açores - 1ª Fase	10th	Relegation Group
	Tier 4	Terceira Divisão	Série Açores Últimos	4th	
2006–07	Tier 5	Distritais	AF Ponta Delgada - 1ª Divisão	1st	Promoted
2007–08	Tier 4	Terceira Divisão	Série Açores - 1ª Fase	5th	Promotion Group
	Tier 4	Terceira Divisão	Série Açores Primeiros	5th	
2008–09	Tier 4	Terceira Divisão	Série Açores - 1ª Fase	8th	Relegation Group
	Tier 4	Terceira Divisão	Série Açores Últimos	2nd	
2009–10	Tier 4	Terceira Divisão	Série Açores - 1ª Fase	8th	Relegation Group
	Tier 4	Terceira Divisão	Série Açores Últimos	5th	Relegated
2010–11	Tier 5	Distritais	AF Ponta Delgada - 1ª Divisão	2nd	
2011–12	Tier 5	Distritais	AF Ponta Delgada - 1ª Divisão	1st	Promoted

== Honours ==
- AF Ponta Delgada Taça Aniversário
  - Winners (1): 2011–12

== Gallery ==
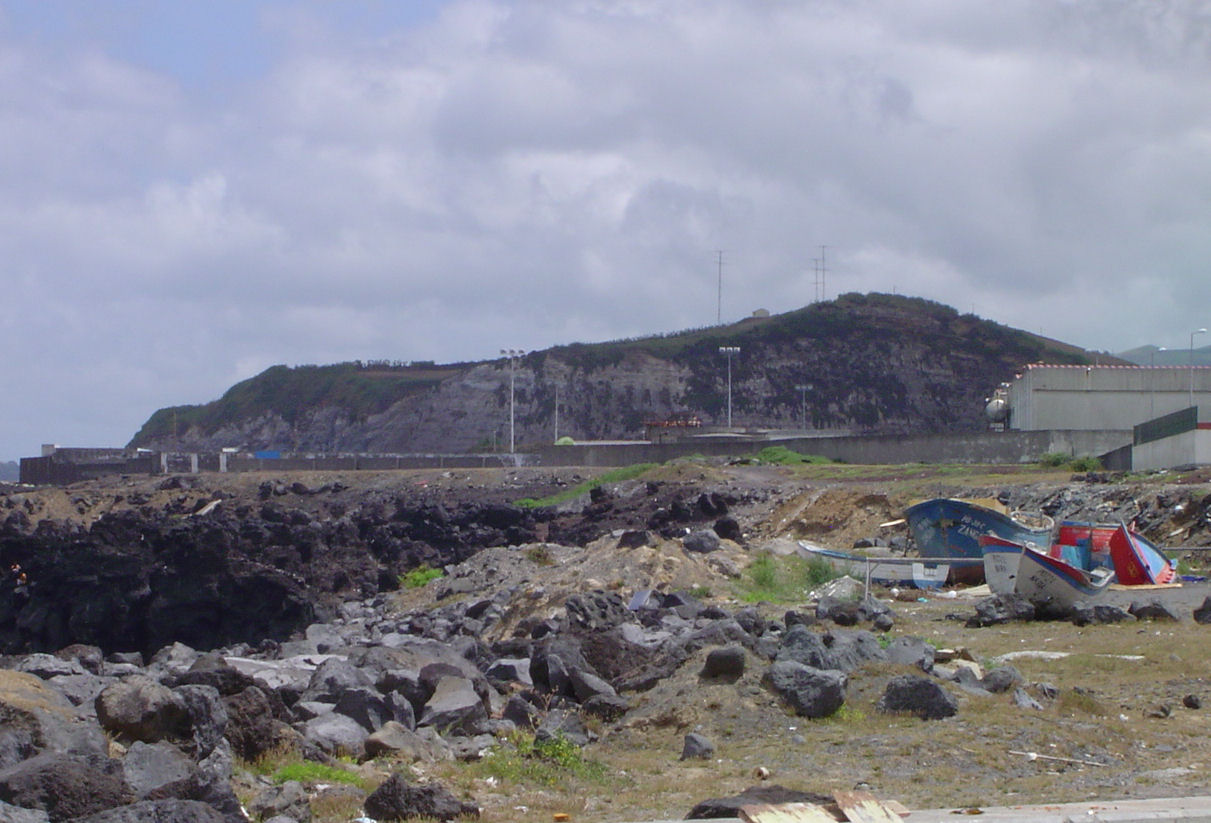
Ground setting

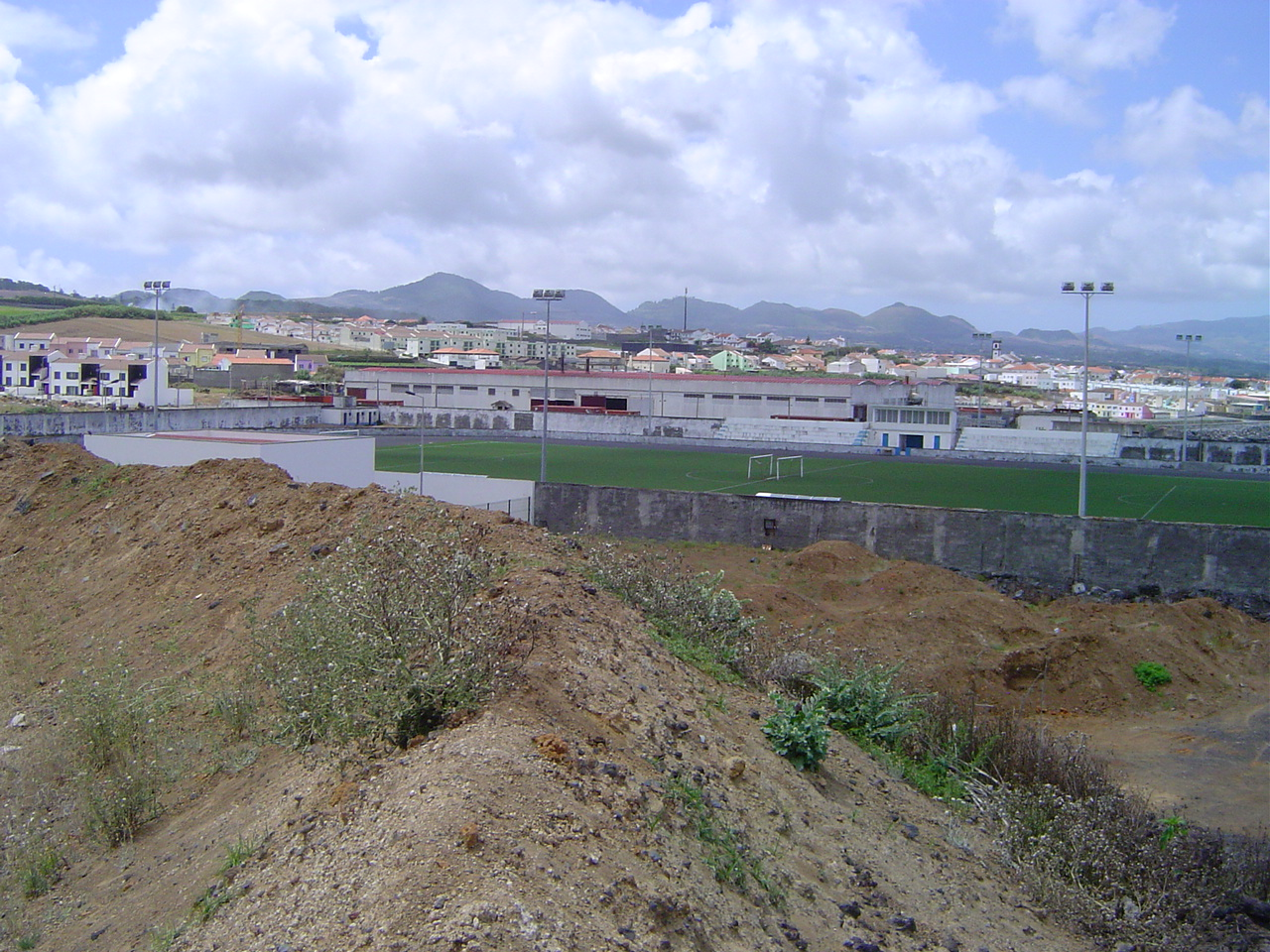
Degraded surroundings

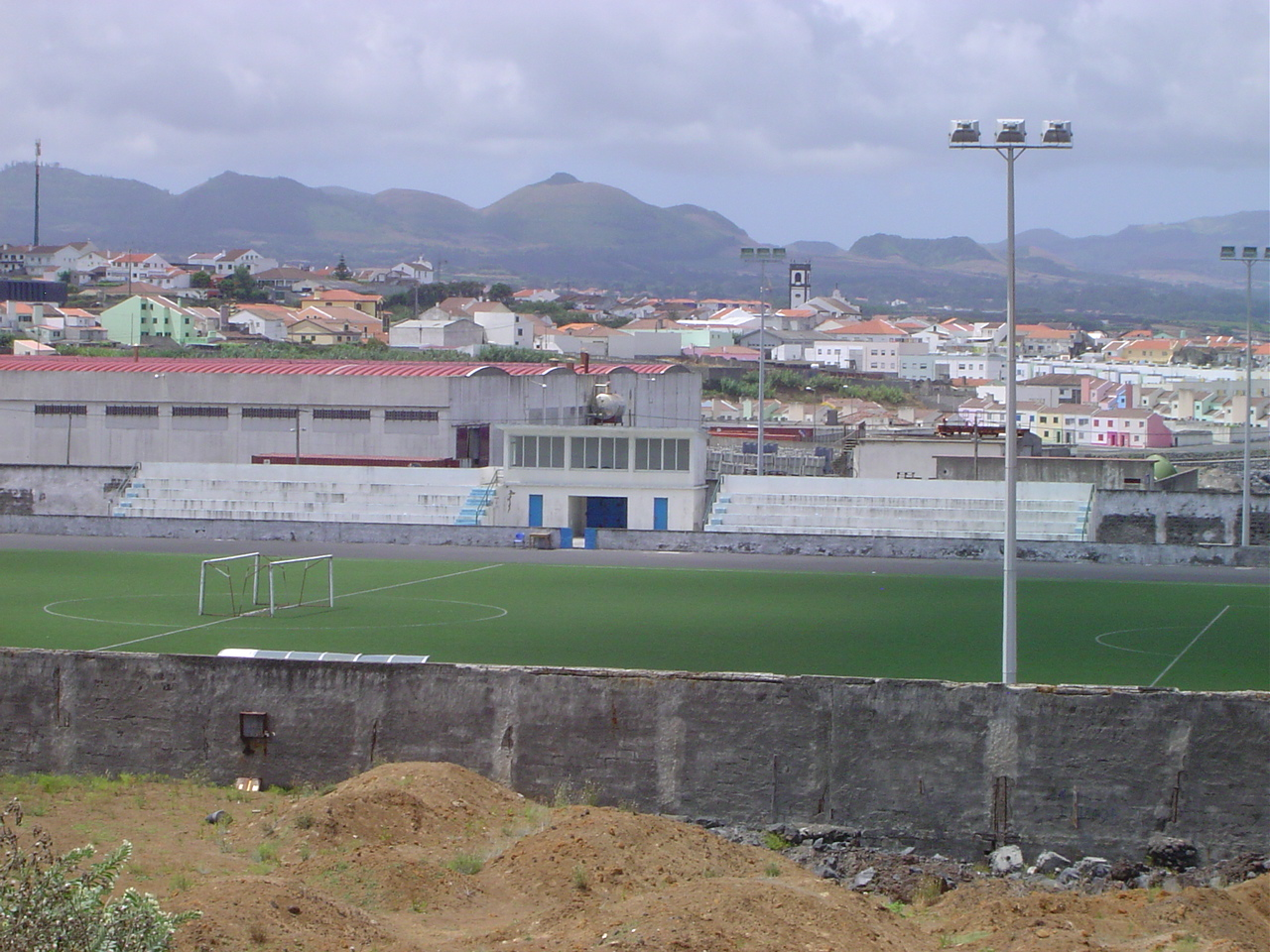
Western view
