= Pico da Pedra =

- Civil parish
- Location of the parish within the island of São Miguel
- Coordinates: 37°47′39.82″N 25°37′7.19″W
- Country: Portugal
- Auton. region: Azores
- Island: São Miguel
- Municipality: Ribeira Grande

Area
  - Total: 6.58 km^{2} (2.54 sq mi)
- Elevation: 152 m (499 ft)

Population (2011)
  - Total: 2,909
  - Density: 440/km^{2} (1,100/sq mi)
- Time zone: UTC−01:00 (AZOT)
  - Summer (DST): UTC+00:00 (AZOST)
- Postal code: 9600-053
- Area code: 292
- Patron: Nossa Senhora das Prazeres

Pico da Pedra (Portuguese: peak of the rock) is a civil parish in the municipality of Ribeira Grande in the Portuguese archipelago of the Azores. The population in 2011 was 2,909, in an area of 6.58 km^{2}.

== History ==
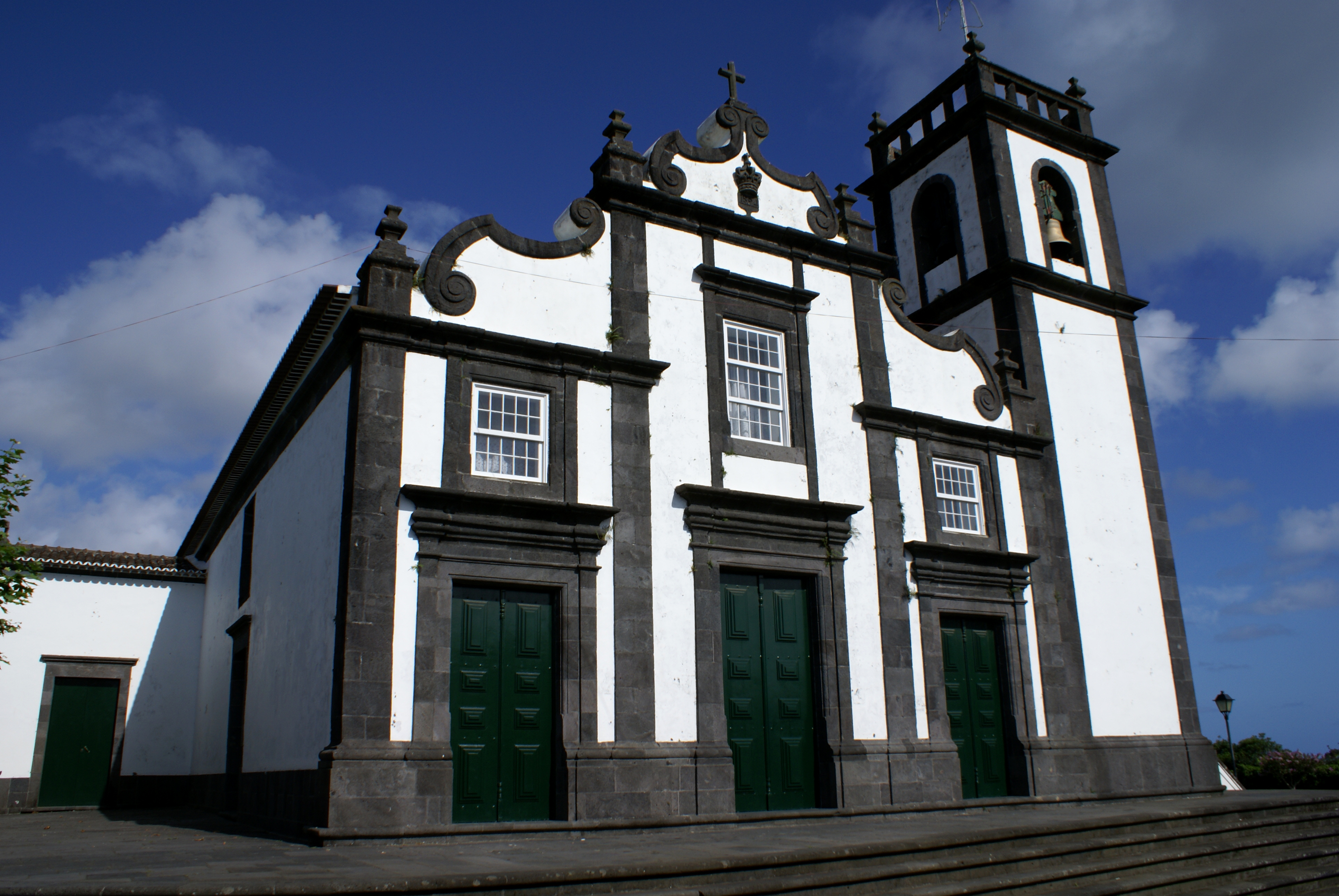
The Church of Nossa Senhora dos Prazeres in the centre of the parish of Pico da Pedra

The settlement of the area began at the beginning of the 16th century.

The origin of its name derives from the 340 metres (1,120 ft) hilltop that was situated south of the settlement, a volcanic cone that first encountered during exploration of the island in the 16th century (and which scattered basaltic lava in its surroundings). The hilltop that the parish takes its name is today covered in Eucalyptus (Eucalyptus globulus) while its top is occupied by to large Araucaria trees. The development of the settlement was conditioned by a lack of water. Owing to few watercourses and higher elevations, wells were difficult to provide water. The populations were, therefore, dependent on gathering rainwater or collecting water from Rabo de Peixe or Ribeira Grande. While wells were excavated in Calhetas, the waters extracted were usually contaminated by seawater. By the 19th century, some local residents spent a days' wages for a barrel of freshwater. When the Baron of Fonte Bela channeled water from the Serra de Água de Pau to his estate in Livramento, the parish's residents requested a portion of this water, which they paid for to channel to the town. On the day that the main water fountain was inaugurated (on 24 June 1836), a celebration was held, where one of the two faucets provided free water and the other celebratory wine. The area was elevated to curate in 1735. By the 19th century, there 900 inhabitants in the parish, resulting in the construction (between 1802 and 1807) of the parochial church dedicated to Nossa Senhora dos Prazeres ("Our Lady of Pleasures"). On 16 June 1835 the parish was elevated to the status of civil parish, and the following the year the channeling of the first potable waters was succeed into the town. It was only in the 20th century that the parish developed initiatives to improve the quality of life in Pico da Pedra, which included the establishment of social centre, cooperative for habitation and consume, sports fields, a Casa do Povo, daycare (in 1961) and seniors centres, and informative services. This included the full electrification of the center and neighborhoods in 1931.

== Geography ==
Pico da Pedra is a landlocked parish situated in the interior of the northern coast of the island of São Miguel, approximately eight kilometres away from the town of Ponta Delgada and ten kilometres from municipal seat of Ribeira Grande. It is surrounded in the north and west by the parishes of Calhetas and Fenais da Luz, south by Fajã de Cima, São Roque and Livramento and east by the parish of Rabo de Peixe.

It contains the localities Cancela, Pico da Pedra, Pico do Ataíde, Pico do Boi, Tapada do Fernandes and Tronqueira. The population of the parish hovers around 3000 residents. The growth of pedestrianism on the islands of the Azores was the impetus for the creation of the ecological association Amigos dos Açores, whose headquarters is located in Pico da Pedra.

== Economy ==
Over that last decades of the 20th century, the population of Pico da Pedra transformed from a typically rural population, dedicated to agriculture, into a population dedicated to essentially serviced-based activities, employed primarily in the city of Ponta Delgada.

== Architecture ==
=== Civic ===
- Largo de São João - square marking the location of the annual feast celebrations to Saint John
- Largo do Trabalhador - square named for the agricultural workers of the village who gathered there to be collected by estate owners for work
- Quinta de Nossa Senhora dos Prazeres ("Manor of Our Lady of Pleasures") - location of the hermitage of the same name, and one of the first locations mentioned by Gaspar Frutuoso in his treasties Saudades da Terra. It was owned by Adão and Maria Moniz, and inherited by their son Manuel Moniz.

=== Religious ===
- Igreja de Nossa Senhora dos Prazeres ("Church of Our Lady of Pleasures") - supported from contributions from local and neighboring residents, the cornerstone was laid on 2 February 1802, and completed in 1807, being blessed on 3 September 1807.
- Ermida de Nossa Senhora dos Prazeres ("Hermitage of Our Lady of Pleasures") - ordered constructed by Manuel Moniz, it outgrew is local worshipers in the 19th century and was substituted by the Church of the same name.`
