= C.F. Oliveira do Douro =

Portuguese sports club

- Full name: Clube de Futebol Oliveira do Douro
- Founded: 1932
- League: Elite Série 1 AF Porto
- 2020–21: 2nd

Clube de Futebol Oliveira do Douro is a Portuguese sports club from Oliveira do Douro, Vila Nova de Gaia.

The men's football team plays in the Elite Série 1 AF Porto. The team was previously promoted from this league to the 2006–07 Terceira Divisão, remaining on the then-fourth tier until their relegation in 2011. The team also participated in the Taça de Portugal during those years.
