= U.D. Rio Maior =

Defunct association football club in Portugal

Rio Maior
- Full name: União Desportiva Rio Maior
- Founded: 1945
- Dissolved: 2010
- Ground: Municipal de Rio Maior
- Capacity: 7,000
- 2008–09: Terceira Divisão Série E, 3rd
Home colours	Away colours

União Desportiva Rio Maior was a Portuguese association football club, founded in Rio Maior in 1945. It was dissolved in 2010 and last competed in the Terceira Divisão.

== History ==
Founded on 1 September 1945 under the name of C.F. Os Mineiros, the club changed to U.D. Rio Maior in 1976 and reached the Terceira Divisão in 1978. Two seasons later, Rio Maior achieved another promotion, to the Segunda Divisão; their first season in the second division had Jesualdo Ferreira as manager.

Relegated in 1983, Rio Maior suffered another relegation in 1998, being down to the Distritais before returning to the Third Division in 2002 (now the fourth level), and to the Second Division three seasons later. Ahead of the 2009–10 campaign, Rio Maior's players started a strike after having unpaid wages, and later terminated their contracts with the club; Rio Maior later folded.

== Managers ==
- (Portugal) Paulo Torres (2007 – 2009)
