= G.D. Torre de Moncorvo =

Portuguese sports club

- Full name: Grupo Desportivo Torre de Moncorvo
- Founded: 1967
- Ground: Estádio Engenheiro José Aires, Torre de Moncorvo
- Capacity: 2000
- League: Honra AF Bragança
- 2017–18: 11th of 11

Grupo Desportivo Torre de Moncorvo is a Portuguese sports club from Torre de Moncorvo.

The men's football team plays in the Divisão de Honra AF Bragança. The team played on the third tier in the 2016–17 Campeonato de Portugal, but performed abysmally. Formerly the team was a mainstay on the fourth tier, the Terceira Divisão.

== Sponsorship ==
Since 2022, the club is sponsored by Aethel Mining. In 2025, the club signed an agreement with Movhera to support its youth training structure, including funding for coaches and equipment through to the 2026–27 season.
