= G.D. Milheiroense =

Portuguese football club

Grupo Desportivo Milheiroense
- Full name: Grupo Desportivo Milheiroense
- Nickname(s): Unknown
- Founded: 1975
- Ground: Milheirós de Poiares, Portugal
- Capacity: N/A
- Chairman: Edgar Perestrelo Lima
- Manager: N/A
- League: Aveiro Football Third Division
- 2006–07: Third division

The Grupo Desportivo Milheiroense is a Portuguese football (soccer) club in the parish of Rio Meão, municipality of Santa Maria da Feira, the district of Aveiro. The team currently plays in the third division of the district of Aveiro.

The club was founded on October 23, 1975. Its current president is Edgar Perestrelo Lima.

== Presidents ==
- 1975–1976: Serafim Tavares 2nd district division
- 1976–1977: Licínio Pina 2nd district division
- 1977–1978: Valdemar Pinho 2nd district division
- 1978–1979: Manuel Ferreira 1st district division
- 1979–1980: José Campos 1st district division
- 1980–1981: Augusto Casimiro 1st district division
- 1981–1982: Augusto Casimiro 1st district division
- 1982–1983: Augusto Casimiro 1st district division
- 1983–1984: César Lisboa 1st district division
- 1984–1985: Alfredo de Azevedo 2nd district division
- 1985–1986: Alfredo de Azevedo 1st district division
- 1986–1987: Joaquim Lima 1st district division
- 1987–1988: Rui 1st district division
- 1988–1989: Adriano Martins 1st district division
- 1989–1990: Armando Lima Oliveira 1st district division
- 1990–1991: Manuel Lima 1st district division
- 1991–1992: António Costa 1st district division
- 1992–1993: Manuel Lima 2nd district division
- 1993–1994: José Rocha 1st district division
- 1994–1995: Adriano Martins 1st district division
- 1995–1996: Adriano Martins 1st district division
- 1996–1997: Arménio Pinho 1st district division
- 1997–1998: António Ferreira 1st district division
- 1998–1999: Arménio Pinho 1st district division
- 1999–2000: Arménio Pinho 1st district division
- 2000–2001: Arménio Pinho 1st district division
- 2001–2002: Arménio Pinho 3rd National division
- 2002–2003: Arménio Pinho 3rd National division
- 2003–2004: Arménio Pinho 3rd National division
- 2004–2005: Edgar Perestrelo 3rd National division
- 2005–2006: Edgar Perestrelo 3rd National division
- 2006–2007: Edgar Perestrelo 3rd National division

== League ==
- National Third Division (2006–2007)

== Participation ==
- Aveiro District First Division: 1991/92
- Aveiro Honra DivisionL 2000/2001
- National First Division 1980/1981

== Stadium ==
The team home ground is the Complexo Desportivo de Milheirós de Poiares and it features a natural turf surface.

== Equipments ==
The official kit used by the team is made by Patrick and "Irmãos Tavares Lda." are the sponsors.
