= S.C. Ideal =

Portuguese sports club

Sporting Ideal
- Full name: Sporting Clube Ideal
- Founded: 1931; 95 years ago
- Ground: Campo Municipal da Ribeira Grande, Ribeira Grande
- Capacity: 2,500
- League: Portuguese District Championships
- 2021–22: Campeonato de Portugal, relegated

Sporting Clube Ideal is a Portuguese sports club from Ribeira Grande.

The men's football team plays in the Portuguese District Championships, the fifth tier of Portuguese football. Throughout the 2010s, they were arguably the most supported club in the island. The team was also promoted to the Campeonato de Portugal, then the third tier, for the 2015–16 season.

== Notable former players ==
- (Brazil) Douglas Abner
- (Senegal) Mamadou Ba
- (Portugal) Cláudio Braga
- (Democratic Republic of the Congo) Brian Cipenga
- (France) Momo Diaby
- (Gabon) Junior Oto'o
- (Canada) Pedro Pacheco
