= 1994–95 Terceira Divisão =

Terceira Divisão
- Season: 1994–95

The 1994–95 Terceira Divisão season was the 48th season of the competition and the 5th season of recognised fourth-tier football in Portugal.

== Overview ==
The league was contested by 108 teams in 6 divisions of 18 teams in each.

== Terceira Divisão – Série A ==
Pos	Team	Pld	W	D	L	GF	GA	GD	Pts	Promotion or relegation
1	Os Sandinenses	34	19	7	8	48	24	+24	45	Promotion to Segunda Divisão
2	Santa Maria FC	34	17	11	6	54	35	+19	45	Promotion to Segunda Divisão
3	Merelinense FC	34	17	10	7	48	27	+21	44	
4	FC Marinhas	34	14	14	6	34	25	+9	42	
5	ADC Montalegre	34	15	11	8	41	37	+4	41	
6	Vieira SC	34	15	8	11	39	25	+14	38	
7	GD Joane	34	13	11	10	46	32	+14	37	
8	Juventude Pedras Salgadas	34	13	9	12	40	44	−4	35	
9	SC Vila Pouca de Aguiar	34	11	12	11	41	32	+9	34	
10	SC Maria da Fonte	34	12	10	12	39	39	0	34	
11	FC Amares	34	11	11	12	39	40	−1	33	
12	Caçadores das Taipas	34	10	13	11	36	37	−1	33	
13	GD Bragança	34	8	16	10	44	35	+9	32	
14	GD Pevidém	34	10	12	12	36	42	−6	32	
15	Âncora Praia FC	34	12	8	14	50	43	+7	32	Relegation to Distritais
16	Neves FC	34	10	8	16	35	49	−14	28	Relegation to Distritais
17	UD Lanheses	34	6	6	22	32	73	−41	18	Relegation to Distritais
18	SC Mirandela	34	1	7	26	15	78	−63	9	Relegation to Distritais

== Terceira Divisão – Série B ==
Pos	Team	Pld	W	D	L	GF	GA	GD	Pts	Promotion or relegation
1	SC Lamego	34	19	12	3	49	20	+29	50	Promotion to Segunda Divisão
2	SC Vila Real	34	18	11	5	49	21	+28	47	Promotion to Segunda Divisão
3	SC Régua	34	15	9	10	54	44	+10	39	
4	Pedrouços AC	34	14	9	11	44	43	+1	37	
5	AD São Pedro da Cova	34	11	14	9	45	45	0	36	
6	União Paredes	34	12	11	11	46	42	+4	35	
7	Rebordosa AC	34	13	8	13	48	44	+4	34	
8	CD Trofense	34	13	8	13	43	40	+3	34	
9	Fiães SC	34	13	7	14	49	49	0	33	
10	SC Castêlo da Maia	34	12	9	13	53	44	+9	33	
11	Vilanovense FC	34	10	13	11	31	31	0	33	
12	Gondomar SC	34	10	12	12	35	35	0	32	
13	SC Senhora da Hora	34	13	6	15	34	38	−4	32	
14	SC Rio Tinto	34	11	10	13	29	36	−7	32	
15	Aliados Lordelo	34	11	10	13	42	41	+1	32	Relegation to Distritais
16	Ermesinde SC	34	10	5	19	34	61	−27	25	Relegation to Distritais
17	CD Paços de Brandão	34	7	10	17	27	48	−21	24	Relegation to Distritais
18	CD Souselo	34	7	10	17	28	58	−30	24	Relegation to Distritais

== Terceira Divisão – Série C ==
Pos	Team	Pld	W	D	L	GF	GA	GD	Pts	Promotion or relegation
1	AC Cucujães	34	24	6	4	64	22	+42	54	Promotion to Segunda Divisão
2	SC Covilhã	34	22	7	5	62	22	+40	51	Promotion to Segunda Divisão
3	CD Arrifanense	34	20	9	5	58	22	+36	49	
4	SC Penalva do Castelo	34	16	9	9	52	34	+18	41	
5	AA Avanca	34	16	8	10	72	61	+11	40	
6	SC São João de Ver	34	13	9	12	50	47	+3	35	
7	Anadia FC	34	11	13	10	51	38	+13	35	
8	Oliveira do Bairro	34	11	11	12	35	41	−6	33	
9	Os Marialvas	34	11	10	13	27	37	−10	32	
10	GD Tourizense	34	11	9	14	42	46	−4	31	
11	AD Fornos de Algodres	34	11	8	15	48	56	−8	30	
12	CD Estarreja	34	10	10	14	32	36	−4	30	
13	SL Nelas	34	11	7	16	33	40	−7	29	
14	GD Argus	34	7	15	12	41	51	−10	29	
15	Lusitano Vildemoinhos	34	9	9	16	35	47	−12	27	Relegation to Distritais
16	UD Belmonte	34	10	3	21	36	74	−38	23	Relegation to Distritais
17	Mortágua FC	34	7	9	18	22	58	−36	23	Relegation to Distritais
18	GD Mealhada	34	7	6	21	38	63	−25	20	Relegation to Distritais

== Terceira Divisão – Série D ==
Pos	Team	Pld	W	D	L	GF	GA	GD	Pts	Promotion or relegation
1	CD Mafra	34	21	7	6	58	31	+27	49	Promotion to Segunda Divisão
2	UD Vilafranquense	34	20	9	5	59	26	+33	49	Promotion to Segunda Divisão
3	Sertanense FC	34	19	9	6	35	21	+14	47	
4	CD Fátima	34	18	8	8	50	23	+27	44	
5	SC Pombal	34	17	8	9	47	28	+19	42	
6	CA Mirandense	33	15	8	10	49	41	+8	38	
7	CD Lousanense	33	13	11	9	41	34	+7	37	
8	SC Leiría e Marrazes	34	13	11	10	48	41	+7	37	
9	GD Benavente	34	13	8	13	45	41	+4	34	
10	GD Portalegrense	34	13	8	13	55	43	+12	34	
11	União Almeirim	34	12	8	14	48	48	0	32	
12	UD Rio Maior	34	11	8	15	36	41	−5	30	
13	UFCI Tomar	34	6	16	12	32	38	−6	28	
14	ADC Proença a Nova	34	8	11	15	29	47	−18	27	
15	AD Castelo de Vide	34	7	10	17	30	49	−19	24	Relegation to Distritais
16	SL Marinha	33	9	4	20	28	54	−26	22	Relegation to Distritais
17	Escolar Bombarralense	33	6	8	19	27	55	−28	20	Relegation to Distritais
18	CR 22 de Junho Amor	34	3	8	23	23	79	−56	14	Relegation to Distritais

== Terceira Divisão – Série E ==
Pos	Team	Pld	W	D	L	GF	GA	GD	Pts	Promotion or relegation
1	AD Machico	34	27	5	2	73	19	+54	59	Promotion to Segunda Divisão
2	AD Camacha	34	22	9	3	69	21	+48	53	Promotion to Segunda Divisão
3	CSD Câmara de Lobos	34	16	12	6	45	31	+14	44	
4	SC Santacruzense	34	14	11	9	32	23	+9	39	
5	CD Portosantense	34	13	12	9	40	40	0	38	
6	CD São Vicente	34	14	8	12	45	35	+10	36	
7	GD Samora Correia	34	12	11	11	40	45	−5	35	
8	AC Malveira	34	14	6	14	48	34	+14	34	
9	SU Sintrense	34	15	3	16	45	47	−2	33	
10	Operário Açores	34	12	9	13	42	39	+3	33	
11	SC Lusitânia	34	13	7	14	33	27	+6	33	
12	GS Loures	34	9	14	11	31	26	+5	32	
13	Alhandra SC	34	12	8	14	39	46	−7	32	
14	SC Angrense	34	11	7	16	37	49	−12	29	
15	União Micaelense	34	9	10	15	23	45	−22	28	
16	Mira Mar SC	34	5	12	17	33	67	−34	22	
17	SL Olivais	34	4	9	21	28	59	−31	17	Relegation to Distritais
18	CD Santa Clara	34	3	9	22	20	70	−50	15	

== Terceira Divisão – Série F ==
Pos	Team	Pld	W	D	L	GF	GA	GD	Pts	Promotion or relegation
1	CD Beja	34	21	8	5	64	28	+36	50	Promotion to Segunda Divisão
2	Silves FC	34	17	10	7	52	34	+18	44	Promotion to Segunda Divisão
3	Padernense Clube	34	17	9	8	47	33	+14	43	
4	Imortal DC	34	17	7	10	35	23	+12	41	
5	Vasco da Gama AC Sines	34	14	10	10	50	35	+15	38	
6	Seixal FC	34	15	8	11	41	28	+13	38	
7	Esperança Lagos	34	12	10	12	39	40	−1	34	
8	UFCI Setúbal	34	13	8	13	45	44	+1	34	
9	Palmelense FC	34	12	10	12	39	31	+8	34	
10	Estrela Vendas Novas	34	13	8	13	34	39	−5	34	
11	Lusitano VRSA	34	11	12	11	40	40	0	34	
12	FC Castrense	34	11	11	12	35	37	−2	33	
13	GC Tavira	34	12	8	14	23	31	−8	32	
14	AC Alcacerense	34	11	9	14	35	39	−4	31	
15	CD Cova da Piedade	34	10	11	13	30	41	−11	31	Relegation to Distritais
16	FC Serpa	34	8	15	11	32	45	−13	31	Relegation to Distritais
17	UDR Sambrasense	34	4	10	20	23	51	−28	18	Relegation to Distritais
18	AC Salir	34	3	6	25	28	73	−45	12	Relegation to Distritais
