= 1992–93 Terceira Divisão =

Terceira Divisão
- Season: 1992–93

The 1992–93 Terceira Divisão season was the 46th season of the competition and the 3rd season of recognised fourth-tier football in Portugal.

== Overview ==
The league was contested by 108 teams in 6 divisions of 18 teams in each.

== Terceira Divisão – Série A ==
Pos	Team	Pld	W	D	L	GF	GA	GD	Pts	Promotion or relegation
1	FC Amares	34	21	7	6	57	26	+31	49	Promotion to Segunda Divisão
2	Juventude Ronfe	34	18	11	5	58	17	+41	47	Promotion to Segunda Divisão
3	Santa Maria FC	34	15	12	7	58	32	+26	42	
4	FC Marinhas	34	17	7	10	45	44	+1	41	
5	UD Lanheses	34	13	13	8	42	34	+8	39	
6	AD Limianos	34	12	12	10	44	35	+9	36	
7	GD Bragança	34	12	11	11	36	31	+5	35	
8	GD Joane	34	12	11	11	35	30	+5	35	
9	Neves FC	34	13	9	12	51	41	+10	35	
10	SC Vila Pouca de Aguiar	34	14	7	13	45	47	−2	35	
11	Caçadores das Taipas	34	10	14	10	24	28	−4	34	
12	Juventude Pedras Salgadas	34	11	11	12	44	38	+6	33	
13	SC Maria da Fonte	34	10	13	11	26	37	−11	33	
14	Vieira SC	34	12	8	14	33	36	−3	32	
15	CRP Delães	34	10	10	14	34	43	−9	30	Relegation to Distritais
16	Merelinense FC	34	8	9	17	22	42	−20	25	Relegation to Distritais
17	ADC Montalegre	34	4	12	18	28	51	−23	20	Relegation to Distritais
18	FC Mãe de Água	34	2	7	25	18	88	−70	11	Relegation to Distritais

== Terceira Divisão – Série B ==
Pos	Team	Pld	W	D	L	GF	GA	GD	Pts	Promotion or relegation
1	Dragões Sandinenses	34	24	5	5	81	25	+56	53	Promotion to Segunda Divisão
2	Lixa FC	34	23	6	5	67	32	+35	52	Promotion to Segunda Divisão
3	SC Lamego	34	22	7	5	71	19	+52	51	
4	Rebordosa AC	34	19	11	4	58	26	+32	49	
5	Amarante FC	34	18	6	10	54	40	+14	42	
6	FC Mogadourense	34	15	11	8	52	46	+6	41	
7	Fiães SC	34	15	9	10	48	32	+16	39	
8	SC Esmoriz	34	13	9	12	49	43	+6	35	
9	SC Régua	34	13	8	13	49	37	+12	34	
10	Pedrouços AC	34	14	5	15	56	52	+4	33	
11	AD São Pedro da Cova	34	8	13	13	28	48	−20	29	
12	SC Rio Tinto	33	8	12	13	37	35	+2	28	
13	Aliados Lordelo	34	8	11	15	37	44	−7	27	
14	SC Castêlo da Maia	34	8	11	15	35	47	−12	27	
15	AR São Martinho	34	8	7	19	36	64	−28	23	Relegation to Distritais
16	CF Oliveira do Douro	34	8	7	19	36	67	−31	23	Relegation to Distritais
17	FC Avintes	33	5	6	22	23	60	−37	16	Relegation to Distritais
18	GD Foz Côa	34	3	2	29	30	130	−100	8	Relegation to Distritais

== Terceira Divisão – Série C ==
Pos	Team	Pld	W	D	L	GF	GA	GD	Pts	Promotion or relegation
1	União Coimbra	34	21	13	0	62	15	+47	55	Promotion to Segunda Divisão
2	SC Covilhã	34	21	7	6	53	19	+34	49	Promotion to Segunda Divisão
3	SC Penalva do Castelo	34	14	11	9	32	25	+7	39	
4	Lusitano Vildemoinhos	34	14	10	10	48	39	+9	38	
5	CD Arrifanense	34	13	12	9	32	34	−2	38	
6	CD Tondela	34	14	7	13	29	32	−3	35	
7	CD Estarreja	34	13	8	13	43	34	+9	34	
8	GD Argus	34	10	14	10	26	30	−4	34	
9	AA Avanca	34	12	10	12	37	36	+1	34	
10	Mortágua FC	34	10	12	12	33	36	−3	32	
11	SC Alba	34	9	13	12	27	35	−8	31	
12	Os Marialvas	34	10	10	14	35	37	−2	30	
13	Oliveira do Bairro	34	9	11	14	35	41	−6	29	
14	CD Gouveia	34	10	9	15	22	40	−18	29	
15	AD Ala Arriba	34	8	12	14	34	39	−5	28	Relegation to Distritais
16	RC Brasfemes	34	8	11	15	27	48	−21	27	Relegation to Distritais
17	UD Pinhelenses	34	8	10	16	29	52	−23	26	Relegation to Distritais
18	GD Mangualde	34	8	8	18	28	40	−12	24	Relegation to Distritais

== Terceira Divisão – Série D ==
Pos	Team	Pld	W	D	L	GF	GA	GD	Pts	Promotion or relegation
1	SC Lourinhanense	34	23	8	3	61	12	+49	54	Promotion to Segunda Divisão
2	Naval 1º Maio	34	20	10	4	65	25	+40	50	Promotion to Segunda Divisão
3	Beneditense CD	34	21	7	6	64	27	+37	49	
4	CD Alcains	34	16	13	5	53	26	+27	45	
5	UD Santarém	34	16	10	8	60	31	+29	42	
6	Sertanense FC	34	16	8	10	44	31	+13	40	
7	UD Rio Maior	34	14	10	10	50	42	+8	38	
8	CA Mirandense	34	13	11	10	50	40	+10	37	
9	SC Pombal	34	12	12	10	44	32	+12	36	
10	SC Leiría e Marrazes	34	9	16	9	36	39	−3	34	
11	GD Portalegrense	34	9	11	14	41	51	−10	29	
12	CR Arronchense	34	8	13	13	30	58	−28	29	
13	SL Marinha	34	10	7	17	43	58	−15	27	
14	Estrela Portalegre	34	6	12	16	29	42	−13	24	
15	AD Portomosense	34	7	9	18	27	57	−30	23	Relegation to Distritais
16	AC Alcanenense	34	4	13	17	17	50	−33	21	Relegation to Distritais
17	AD Fundão	34	3	12	19	23	66	−43	18	Relegation to Distritais
18	Os Nazarenos	34	5	6	23	29	79	−50	16	Relegation to Distritais

== Terceira Divisão – Série E ==
Pos	Team	Pld	W	D	L	GF	GA	GD	Pts	Promotion or relegation
1	Odivelas FC	34	19	11	4	57	21	+36	49	Promotion to Segunda Divisão
2	AD Camacha	34	18	11	5	46	23	+23	47	Promotion to Segunda Divisão
3	Operário Açores	34	15	11	8	46	34	+12	41	
4	SC Lusitânia	34	15	10	9	37	26	+11	40	
5	Praiense SC	34	11	16	7	43	26	+17	38	
6	AD Machico	34	9	19	6	30	27	+3	37	
7	CD Portosantense	34	12	12	10	35	25	+10	36	
8	SG Sacavenense	34	12	12	10	50	36	+14	36	
9	CD São Vicente	34	13	9	12	40	42	−2	35	
10	CD Mafra	34	11	12	11	29	28	+1	34	
11	CSD Câmara de Lobos	34	9	14	11	32	38	−6	32	
12	GD Benavente	34	10	12	12	39	47	−8	32	
13	SC Angrense	34	10	11	13	30	43	−13	31	
14	CD Santa Clara	34	8	14	12	27	40	−13	30	
15	GD Samora Correia	33	7	13	13	25	39	−14	27	Relegation to Distritais
16	GS Loures	34	10	6	18	35	48	−13	26	Relegation to Distritais
17	Atlético Cacém	34	5	11	18	33	59	−26	21	Relegation to Distritais
18	SC Borbense	33	3	12	18	23	55	−32	18	Relegation to Distritais

== Terceira Divisão – Série F ==
Pos	Team	Pld	W	D	L	GF	GA	GD	Pts	Promotion or relegation
1	AC Salir	34	19	9	6	41	19	+22	47	Promotion to Segunda Divisão
2	Oriental Lisboa	34	18	10	6	49	18	+31	46	Promotion to Segunda Divisão
3	Mineiro Aljustrelense	34	15	12	7	45	27	+18	42	
4	Silves FC	34	16	10	8	43	30	+13	42	
5	Seixal FC	34	10	18	6	41	26	+15	38	
6	Casa Pia AC	34	13	11	10	37	35	+2	37	
7	CD Beja	34	13	10	11	42	28	+14	36	
8	FC Castrense	34	12	11	11	30	23	+7	35	
9	Moura AC	34	13	8	13	45	39	+6	34	
10	GD Lagoa	34	10	13	11	34	40	−6	33	
11	AC Alcacerense	34	11	11	12	28	29	−1	33	
12	Padernense Clube	34	12	9	13	44	49	−5	33	
13	Imortal DC	34	11	10	13	28	40	−12	32	
14	Palmelense FC	34	10	12	12	25	29	−4	32	
15	Leões FC	34	7	15	12	30	54	−24	29	Relegation to Distritais
16	Almada AC	34	11	7	16	46	46	0	29	Relegation to Distritais
17	CR Grandolense	34	7	7	20	25	49	−24	21	Relegation to Distritais
18	SR Almancilense	34	2	9	23	19	71	−52	13	Relegation to Distritais
