= 1995–96 Terceira Divisão =

Terceira Divisão
- Season: 1995–96

The 1995–96 Terceira Divisão season was the 49th season of the competition and the 6th season of recognised fourth-tier football in Portugal.

== Overview ==
The league was contested by 108 teams in 6 divisions of 18 teams in each.

== Terceira Divisão – Série A ==
Pos	Team	Pld	W	D	L	GF	GA	GD	Pts	Promotion or relegation
1	AD Fafe	34	21	11	2	67	22	+45	74	Promotion to Segunda Divisão
2	ADC Montalegre	34	20	8	6	65	39	+26	68	Promotion to Segunda Divisão
3	SC Maria da Fonte	34	19	7	8	52	31	+21	64	
4	Caçadores das Taipas	34	15	14	5	58	40	+18	59	
5	Merelinense FC	34	14	11	9	42	33	+9	53	
6	Juventude Ronfe	34	15	7	12	44	39	+5	52	
7	SC Vila Pouca de Aguiar	34	14	6	14	45	40	+5	48	
8	GD Ribeirão	34	12	11	11	54	43	+11	47	
9	GD Pevidém	34	12	11	11	33	34	−1	47	
10	SC Valenciano	34	13	7	14	37	35	+2	46	
11	GD Joane	34	11	12	11	43	43	0	45	
12	GD Bragança	34	11	11	12	45	43	+2	44	
13	FC Amares	34	11	10	13	31	31	0	43	
14	Vieira SC	34	11	8	15	41	49	−8	41	
15	Juventude Pedras Salgadas	34	9	8	17	38	55	−17	35	Relegation to Distritais
16	CRP Delães	34	8	6	20	37	68	−31	30	Relegation to Distritais
17	FC Marinhas	34	8	6	20	30	54	−24	30	Relegation to Distritais
18	FC Mogadourense	34	2	6	26	24	76	−52	12	Relegation to Distritais

== Terceira Divisão – Série B ==
Pos	Team	Pld	W	D	L	GF	GA	GD	Pts	Promotion or relegation
1	AD Lousada	34	18	10	6	77	42	+35	64	Promotion to Segunda Divisão
2	Gondomar SC	34	18	6	10	53	25	+28	60	Promotion to Segunda Divisão
3	SC Senhora da Hora	34	16	11	7	63	36	+27	59	
4	CD Trofense	34	16	5	13	47	37	+10	53	
5	UD Valonguense	34	13	13	8	40	31	+9	52	
6	SC Régua	34	14	9	11	44	43	+1	51	
7	ADC Santa Marta de Penaguião	34	14	8	12	39	38	+1	50	
8	AD São Pedro da Cova	34	14	8	12	51	52	−1	50	
9	União Paredes	34	14	8	12	36	36	0	50	
10	Dragões Sandinenses	34	13	9	12	64	40	+24	48	
11	Pedrouços AC	33	13	8	12	48	50	−2	47	
12	Rebordosa AC	34	13	6	15	44	50	−6	45	
13	SC Castêlo da Maia	34	10	13	11	41	38	+3	43	
14	Vilanovense FC	34	10	13	11	26	32	−6	43	
15	SC Rio Tinto	34	8	14	12	34	37	−3	38	Relegation to Distritais
16	CD Cinfães	34	8	7	19	37	65	−28	31	Relegation to Distritais
17	FC Avintes	33	5	11	17	30	60	−30	26	Relegation to Distritais
18	GD Foz Côa	34	5	7	22	25	87	−62	22	Relegation to Distritais

== Terceira Divisão – Série C ==
Pos	Team	Pld	W	D	L	GF	GA	GD	Pts	Promotion or relegation
1	AD Guarda	34	25	6	3	85	26	+59	81	Promotion to Segunda Divisão
2	CD Arrifanense	34	24	7	3	91	20	+71	79	Promotion to Segunda Divisão
3	Fiães SC	34	18	9	7	66	37	+29	63	
4	Anadia FC	34	15	12	7	59	39	+20	57	
5	AD Fornos de Algodres	34	16	9	9	51	47	+4	57	
6	RD Águeda	34	16	8	10	63	41	+22	56	
7	SC Penalva do Castelo	34	16	6	12	61	38	+23	54	
8	SC São João de Ver	34	15	7	12	55	44	+11	52	
9	ADC Lobão	34	15	6	13	40	43	−3	51	
10	GD São Roque	34	13	8	13	43	40	+3	47	
11	CD Estarreja	34	13	8	13	38	38	0	47	
12	AA Avanca	34	11	7	16	39	46	−7	40	
13	GD Tourizense	34	10	9	15	47	53	−6	39	
14	Oliveira do Bairro	34	10	8	16	34	49	−15	38	
15	Os Marialvas	34	9	11	14	40	54	−14	38	Relegation to Distritais
16	SL Nelas	34	4	7	23	27	79	−52	19	Relegation to Distritais
17	DR Colmeal Torre	34	4	5	25	19	90	−71	17	Relegation to Distritais
18	UD Sampedrense	34	2	7	25	19	93	−74	13	Relegation to Distritais

== Terceira Divisão – Série D ==
Pos	Team	Pld	W	D	L	GF	GA	GD	Pts	Promotion or relegation
1	AC Alcanenense	34	21	8	5	68	30	+38	71	Promotion to Segunda Divisão
2	GD Sourense	34	18	12	4	62	37	+25	66	Promotion to Segunda Divisão
3	AD Portomosense	34	17	9	8	55	35	+20	60	
4	AC Marinhense	34	17	8	9	51	32	+19	59	
5	UD Rio Maior	34	15	7	12	53	42	+11	52	
6	Sertanense FC	34	14	9	11	55	35	+20	51	
7	SC Pombal	34	14	8	12	47	40	+7	50	
8	Estrela Portalegre	34	14	8	12	50	45	+5	50	
9	CD Fátima	34	14	8	12	46	33	+13	50	
10	CA Mirandense	34	13	8	13	58	50	+8	47	
11	CD Lousanense	34	13	5	16	50	51	−1	44	
12	CA Riachense	34	12	8	14	33	48	−15	44	
13	Académico Paço	34	11	7	16	33	41	−8	40	
14	UFCI Tomar	34	10	8	16	36	51	−15	38	
15	Os Nazarenos	34	9	9	16	36	51	−15	36	Relegation to Distritais
16	SC Leiría e Marrazes	34	9	6	19	37	66	−29	33	Relegation to Distritais
17	GD Argus	34	7	8	19	35	78	−43	29	Relegation to Distritais
18	ADC Proença a Nova	34	8	4	22	33	73	−40	28	Relegation to Distritais

== Terceira Divisão – Série E ==
Pos	Team	Pld	W	D	L	GF	GA	GD	Pts	Promotion or relegation
1	AC Malveira	34	21	9	4	69	20	+49	72	Promotion to Segunda Divisão
2	CSD Câmara de Lobos	34	20	6	8	55	22	+33	66	Promotion to Segunda Divisão
3	SC Santacruzense	34	18	8	8	41	22	+19	62	
4	O Elvas CAD	34	16	9	9	46	37	+9	57	
5	GS Loures	34	16	8	10	39	32	+7	56	
6	CD Portosantense	34	14	11	9	41	32	+9	53	
7	1º Maio Sarilhense	34	15	7	12	42	37	+5	52	
8	SU Sintrense	34	14	8	12	44	35	+9	50	
9	CD São Vicente	34	15	5	14	48	46	+2	50	
10	CF Benfica	34	12	13	9	47	41	+6	49	
11	Estrela Vendas Novas	34	14	5	15	46	53	−7	47	
12	GD Benavente	34	10	13	11	38	37	+1	43	
13	SG Sacavenense	34	11	8	15	33	42	−9	41	
14	UD Santarém	34	11	4	19	35	50	−15	37	
15	GD Portalegrense	34	9	7	18	37	59	−22	34	Relegation to Distritais
16	GD Samora Correia	34	7	6	21	23	59	−36	27	Relegation to Distritais
17	Alhandra SC	34	6	9	19	29	54	−25	27	Relegation to Distritais
18	União Almeirim	34	7	4	23	27	62	−35	25	Relegation to Distritais

== Terceira Divisão – Série F ==
Pos	Team	Pld	W	D	L	GF	GA	GD	Pts	Promotion or relegation
1	Juventude Évora	34	21	4	9	62	30	+32	67	Promotion to Segunda Divisão
2	Imortal DC	34	19	7	8	67	38	+29	64	Promotion to Segunda Divisão
3	Palmelense FC	34	18	9	7	38	21	+17	63	
4	Esperança Lagos	34	16	11	7	53	30	+23	59	
5	FC Castrense	34	16	9	9	39	36	+3	57	
6	Lusitano VRSA	34	17	4	13	57	33	+24	55	
7	Lusitano Évora	34	13	9	12	39	35	+4	48	
8	GD Pescadores	34	13	9	12	61	42	+19	48	
9	Seixal FC	34	12	10	12	44	37	+7	46	
10	União Santiago	34	11	12	11	45	40	+5	45	
11	Padernense Clube	34	12	9	13	34	37	−3	45	
12	GD Lagoa	34	11	11	12	36	39	−3	44	
13	Vasco da Gama AC Sines	34	11	10	13	49	55	−6	43	
14	UFCI Setúbal	34	11	8	15	30	47	−17	41	
15	AC Alcacerense	34	8	9	17	29	55	−26	33	Relegation to Distritais
16	Atlético Reguengos de Monsaraz	34	8	9	17	26	48	−22	33	Relegation to Distritais
17	SC Odemirense	54	7	8	39	36	67	−31	29	Relegation to Distritais
18	GC Tavira	34	4	8	22	18	73	−55	20	Relegation to Distritais

== Terceira Divisão – Série Açores ==
Série Açores – Preliminary League Table

Pos	Team	Pld	W	D	L	GF	GA	GD	Pts
1	CD Operário	18	12	5	1	50	20	+30	41
2	CD Santa Clara	18	11	5	2	32	10	+22	37 (Note: 1 point deducted?)
3	União Micaelense	18	11	2	5	28	18	+10	35
4	SC Lusitânia	18	9	6	3	32	21	+11	33
5	Mira Mar SC	18	8	5	5	25	25	0	29
6	CD Vila Franca	18	4	5	9	23	31	−8	17
7	SC Horta	18	4	4	10	17	25	−8	16
8	Boavista Ribeirinha	18	3	5	10	14	37	−23	14
9	Águia DC	18	3	4	11	11	27	−16	13
10	SC Angrense	18	3	3	12	13	31	−18	12

Notes:

Série Açores – Promotion Group

Pos	Team	Pld	W	D	L	GF	GA	GD	BP	Pts	Promotion
1	CD Santa Clara	8	5	2	1	16	5	+11	19	36	Promotion to Segunda Divisão
2	União Micaelense	8	4	3	1	15	7	+8	18	33	
3	CD Operário	8	3	2	3	8	12	−4	21	32	
4	SC Lusitânia	8	3	2	3	12	13	−1	17	28	
5	Mira Mar SC	8	0	1	7	6	20	−14	15	16	

Terceira Divisão - Série Açores Relegation Group

Pos	Team	Pld	W	D	L	GF	GA	GD	BP	Pts	Relegation
1	CD Vila Franca	8	6	0	2	15	8	+7	9	27	
2	SC Horta	8	3	3	2	10	10	0	9	21	
3	SC Angrense	8	3	3	2	14	10	+4	5	17	Relegation to Distritais
4	Boavista Ribeirinha	8	3	1	4	12	16	−4	7	17	Relegation to Distritais
5	Águia DC	8	0	3	5	5	12	−7	7	10	Relegation to Distritais
