= 1990–91 Terceira Divisão =

Terceira Divisão
- Season: 1990–91

The 1990–91 Terceira Divisão season was the 44th season of the competition and the 1st season of recognised fourth-tier football in Portugal.

== Overview ==
The league was contested by 108 teams in 6 divisions of 18 teams in each.

== Terceira Divisão – Série A ==
Pos	Team	Pld	W	D	L	GF	GA	GD	Pts	Promotion or relegation
1	Arsenal Braga	34	22	8	4	58	20	+38	52	Promotion to Segunda Divisão
2	Neves FC	34	20	9	5	58	24	+34	49	Promotion to Segunda Divisão
3	SC Maria da Fonte	34	17	9	8	40	19	+21	43	
4	SC Vianense	34	15	10	9	42	20	+22	40	
5	Vieira SC	34	14	11	9	34	26	+8	39	
6	CDA Valdevez	34	15	8	11	42	23	+19	38	
7	Santa Maria FC	34	15	8	11	46	43	+3	38	
8	Juventude Pedras Salgadas	34	15	8	11	36	32	+4	38	
9	Caçadores das Taipas	34	13	12	9	33	32	+1	38	
10	CD Monção	34	11	12	11	35	35	0	34	
11	SC Vila Pouca de Aguiar	34	14	6	14	51	50	+1	34	
12	FC Amares	34	13	6	15	37	37	0	32	
13	CA Macedo de Cavaleiros	34	10	12	12	36	42	−6	32	
14	AD Ponte da Barca	34	10	11	13	32	44	−12	31	
15	CD Ronfe	34	7	13	14	36	50	−14	27	Relegation to Distritais
16	CD Maximinense	34	5	10	19	19	47	−28	20	Relegation to Distritais
17	CD Amadores de Caminha	34	4	6	24	30	68	−38	14	Relegation to Distritais
18	Mondinense FC	34	4	5	25	25	78	−53	13	Relegation to Distritais

== Terceira Divisão – Série B ==
Pos	Team	Pld	W	D	L	GF	GA	GD	Pts	Promotion or relegation
1	Pedrouços AC	34	21	8	5	61	32	+29	50	Promotion to Segunda Divisão
2	Ermesinde SC	34	17	10	7	39	15	+24	44	Promotion to Segunda Divisão
3	Dragões Sandinenses	34	13	15	6	45	35	+10	41	
4	FC Mogadourense	34	12	15	7	48	32	+16	39	
5	SC Régua	34	13	13	8	63	46	+17	39	
6	GD Foz Côa	34	17	3	14	49	37	+12	37	
7	SC Castêlo da Maia	34	12	12	10	46	41	+5	36	
8	UD Valonguense	34	13	9	12	41	47	−6	35	
9	SC Rio Tinto	34	14	7	13	31	40	−9	35	
10	Rebordosa AC	34	12	10	12	37	34	+3	34	
11	AR São Martinho	34	9	15	10	40	36	+4	33	
12	Lixa FC	34	12	7	15	43	52	−9	31	
13	Fiães SC	34	12	7	15	36	39	−3	31	
14	SC Paivense	34	13	5	16	45	61	−16	31	
15	Arsenal Bessa	34	9	11	14	41	49	−8	29	Relegation to Distritais
16	CD Celoricense	34	10	7	17	38	52	−14	27	Relegation to Distritais
17	CF Valadares	34	6	10	18	30	49	−19	22	Relegation to Distritais
18	CF Oliveira do Douro	34	5	8	21	21	57	−36	18	Relegation to Distritais

== Terceira Divisão – Série C ==
Pos	Team	Pld	W	D	L	GF	GA	GD	Pts	Promotion or relegation
1	Lusitânia Lourosa	34	19	9	6	43	21	+22	47	Promotion to Segunda Divisão
2	GD Mealhada	34	19	8	7	58	27	+31	46	Promotion to Segunda Divisão
3	CF Oliveirinha	34	16	11	7	59	36	+23	43	
4	Mortágua FC	34	15	11	8	49	51	−2	41	
5	Oliveira do Bairro	34	17	5	12	46	38	+8	39	
6	AA Avanca	34	15	8	11	40	34	+6	38	
7	Viseu FC	34	14	8	12	46	32	+14	36	
8	GD Argus	34	14	8	12	56	44	+12	36	
9	SC Alba	34	13	9	12	41	33	+8	35	
10	SL Nelas	34	13	9	12	34	36	−2	35	
11	CD Gouveia	34	15	5	14	51	50	+1	35	
12	AD Ala Arriba	34	12	9	13	47	44	+3	33	
13	SC Penalva do Castelo	34	10	12	12	36	29	+7	32	
14	GD Tabuense	34	11	7	16	32	49	−17	29	
15	RC Brasfemes	34	8	13	13	32	43	−11	29	Relegation to Distritais
16	AD Valonguense	34	11	6	17	45	54	−9	28	Relegation to Distritais
17	UD Pinhelenses	34	7	6	21	29	51	−22	20	Relegation to Distritais
18	CD Luso	34	2	6	26	19	91	−72	10	Relegation to Distritais

== Terceira Divisão – Série D ==
Pos	Team	Pld	W	D	L	GF	GA	GD	Pts	Promotion or relegation
1	CD Fátima	34	22	6	6	63	17	+46	50	Promotion to Segunda Divisão
2	CD Torres Novas	34	20	10	4	65	16	+49	50	Promotion to Segunda Divisão
3	AC Marinhense	34	21	8	5	62	14	+48	50	
4	SC Lourinhanense	34	18	11	5	53	27	+26	47	
5	GD Peniche	34	19	9	6	53	24	+29	47	
6	Sertanense FC	34	19	6	9	41	24	+17	44	
7	AC Alcanenense	34	17	8	9	46	23	+23	42	
8	GD Portalegrense	34	13	11	10	38	24	+14	37	
9	Estrela Portalegre	34	11	14	9	36	27	+9	36	
10	Beneditense CD	34	10	11	13	31	46	−15	31	
11	SC Pombal	34	11	7	16	33	51	−18	29	
12	CD Alcains	34	9	9	16	37	51	−14	27	
13	SC Leiría e Marrazes	34	9	9	16	32	46	−14	27	
14	Vitória Fátima	34	7	10	17	30	53	−23	24	
15	AD Poiares	34	7	9	18	31	61	−30	23	Relegation to Distritais
16	Escolar Bombarralense	34	7	6	21	21	52	−31	20	Relegation to Distritais
17	AD Fundão	34	4	8	22	25	76	−51	16	Relegation to Distritais
18	Os Nazarenos	34	3	6	25	22	87	−65	12	Relegation to Distritais

== Terceira Divisão – Série E ==
Pos	Team	Pld	W	D	L	GF	GA	GD	Pts	Promotion or relegation
1	SC Lusitânia	34	20	7	7	47	19	+28	47	Promotion to Segunda Divisão
2	SL Fanhões	34	17	11	6	53	28	+25	45	Promotion to Segunda Divisão
3	FC Amares	34	16	10	8	44	23	+21	42	
4	GD Samora Correia	34	16	10	8	49	27	+22	42	
5	CSD Câmara de Lobos	34	17	6	11	42	21	+21	40	
6	Odivelas FC	34	12	14	8	34	32	+2	38	
7	UD Vilafranquense	34	15	7	12	45	33	+12	37	
8	CD Portosantense	34	12	13	9	37	25	+12	37	
9	Águias Musgueira	34	14	9	11	33	40	−7	37	
10	AC Malveira	34	14	8	12	35	29	+6	36	
11	AD Machico	34	14	8	12	28	29	−1	36	
12	CF Benfica	34	11	9	14	35	36	−1	31	
13	SL Cartaxo	34	11	8	15	40	46	−6	30	
14	GD Marinhais	34	9	9	16	26	48	−22	27	
15	SC Borbense	34	9	7	18	25	47	−22	25	Relegation to Distritais
16	SC Vilanovense	34	6	11	17	23	53	−30	23	Relegation to Distritais
17	CF Estremoz	34	6	11	17	21	46	−25	23	Relegation to Distritais
18	CR Arronchense	34	4	8	22	34	69	−35	16	Relegation to Distritais

== Terceira Divisão – Série F ==
Pos	Team	Pld	W	D	L	GF	GA	GD	Pts	Promotion or relegation
1	Vasco da Gama AC Sines	34	21	7	6	72	37	+35	49	Promotion to Segunda Divisão
2	Imortal DC	34	18	11	5	49	23	+26	47	Promotion to Segunda Divisão
3	Moura AC	34	15	15	4	48	25	+23	45	
4	União Montemor	34	16	12	6	59	24	+35	44	
5	CD Beja	34	16	9	9	53	33	+20	41	
6	Almada AC	34	16	8	10	51	37	+14	40	
7	Leões FC	34	14	9	11	51	34	+17	37	
8	Mineiro Aljustrelense	34	13	11	10	40	32	+8	37	
9	Juventude Belém	34	13	9	12	36	41	−5	35	
10	GD Quimigal	34	13	7	14	48	41	+7	33	
11	SR Almancilense	34	13	7	14	38	43	−5	33	
12	GD Lagoa	34	11	11	12	28	38	−10	33	
13	AC Alcacerense	34	11	6	17	29	56	−27	28	
14	GDR Alvorense	34	9	7	18	32	57	−25	25	Relegation to Distritais
15	Piense SC	34	8	9	17	38	61	−23	25	Relegation to Distritais
16	GD Pescadores	34	8	8	18	26	57	−31	24	Relegation to Distritais
17	Estrela Vendas Novas	34	6	8	20	26	49	−23	20	Relegation to Distritais
18	Palmelense FC	34	3	10	21	22	58	−36	16	Relegation to Distritais
