= 1991–92 Terceira Divisão =

Terceira Divisão
- Season: 1991–92

The 1991–92 Terceira Divisão season was the 45th season of the competition and the 2nd season of recognised fourth-tier football in Portugal.

== Overview ==
The league was contested by 108 teams in 6 divisions of 18 teams in each.

== Terceira Divisão – Série A ==
| Pos | Team | Pld | W | D | L | GF | GA | GD | Pts | Promotion or relegation |
|---|---|---|---|---|---|---|---|---|---|---|
| 1 | SC Vianense | 34 | 17 | 11 | 6 | 54 | 25 | +29 | 45 | Promotion to Segunda Divisão |
| 2 | GD Valpaços | 34 | 15 | 14 | 5 | 46 | 26 | +20 | 44 | Promotion to Segunda Divisão |
| 3 | SC Vila Pouca de Aguiar | 34 | 17 | 9 | 8 | 49 | 30 | +19 | 43 | |
| 4 | Vieira SC | 34 | 15 | 12 | 7 | 54 | 38 | +16 | 42 | |
| 5 | FC Amares | 34 | 15 | 12 | 7 | 47 | 34 | +13 | 42 | |
| 6 | Santa Maria FC | 34 | 15 | 8 | 11 | 46 | 31 | +15 | 38 | |
| 7 | UD Lanheses | 34 | 14 | 9 | 11 | 35 | 36 | −1 | 37 | |
| 8 | Juventude Pedras Salgadas | 34 | 12 | 12 | 10 | 43 | 29 | +14 | 36 | |
| 9 | AR São Martinho | 34 | 13 | 9 | 12 | 57 | 37 | +20 | 35 | |
| 10 | SC Maria da Fonte | 34 | 10 | 15 | 9 | 31 | 34 | −3 | 35 | |
| 11 | GD Bragança | 34 | 11 | 11 | 12 | 42 | 40 | +2 | 33 | |
| 12 | CRP Delães | 34 | 11 | 10 | 13 | 32 | 36 | −4 | 32 | |
| 13 | Caçadores das Taipas | 34 | 10 | 12 | 12 | 27 | 30 | −3 | 32 | |
| 14 | Merelinense FC | 34 | 7 | 17 | 10 | 20 | 37 | −17 | 31 | |
| 15 | CA Macedo de Cavaleiros | 34 | 11 | 8 | 15 | 33 | 43 | −10 | 30 | Relegation to Distritais |
| 16 | CDA Valdevez | 34 | 8 | 14 | 12 | 29 | 37 | −8 | 30 | Relegation to Distritais |
| 17 | CD Monção | 34 | 7 | 5 | 22 | 23 | 65 | −42 | 19 | Relegation to Distritais |
| 18 | SC Mirandela | 34 | 1 | 6 | 27 | 14 | 74 | −60 | 8 | Relegation to Distritais |

== Terceira Divisão – Série B ==
| Pos | Team | Pld | W | D | L | GF | GA | GD | Pts | Promotion or relegation |
|---|---|---|---|---|---|---|---|---|---|---|
| 1 | CD Trofense | 34 | 26 | 3 | 5 | 73 | 24 | +49 | 55 | Promotion to Segunda Divisão |
| 2 | Leça FC | 34 | 21 | 9 | 4 | 70 | 24 | +46 | 51 | Promotion to Segunda Divisão |
| 3 | SC Régua | 34 | 15 | 12 | 7 | 48 | 31 | +17 | 42 | |
| 4 | Amarante FC | 34 | 16 | 6 | 12 | 44 | 31 | +13 | 38 | |
| 5 | Dragões Sandinenses | 34 | 14 | 10 | 10 | 32 | 32 | 0 | 38 | |
| 6 | Rebordosa AC | 34 | 14 | 8 | 12 | 42 | 34 | +8 | 36 | |
| 7 | FC Mogadourense | 34 | 10 | 14 | 10 | 33 | 42 | −9 | 34 | |
| 8 | SC Castêlo da Maia | 34 | 10 | 13 | 11 | 37 | 41 | −4 | 33 | |
| 9 | GD Foz Côa | 34 | 10 | 13 | 11 | 31 | 34 | −3 | 33 | |
| 10 | Lixa FC | 34 | 12 | 8 | 14 | 43 | 38 | +5 | 32 | |
| 11 | Fiães SC | 34 | 10 | 11 | 13 | 34 | 33 | +1 | 31 | |
| 12 | SC Rio Tinto | 34 | 10 | 11 | 13 | 26 | 31 | −5 | 31 | |
| 13 | FC Avintes | 34 | 9 | 12 | 13 | 24 | 37 | −13 | 30 | |
| 14 | AD São Pedro da Cova | 34 | 9 | 12 | 13 | 30 | 48 | −18 | 30 | |
| 15 | GD Torre de Moncorvo | 34 | 11 | 5 | 18 | 34 | 43 | −9 | 27 | Relegation to Distritais |
| 16 | ADC Sanguedo | 34 | 10 | 7 | 17 | 32 | 46 | −14 | 27 | Relegation to Distritais |
| 17 | UD Valonguense | 34 | 7 | 12 | 15 | 29 | 54 | −25 | 26 | Relegation to Distritais |
| 18 | AC Alijoense | 34 | 5 | 8 | 21 | 27 | 55 | −28 | 18 | Relegation to Distritais |

== Terceira Divisão – Série C ==
| Pos | Team | Pld | W | D | L | GF | GA | GD | Pts | Promotion or relegation |
|---|---|---|---|---|---|---|---|---|---|---|
| 1 | AD Guarda | 34 | 21 | 9 | 4 | 68 | 20 | +48 | 51 | Promotion to Segunda Divisão |
| 2 | Anadia FC | 34 | 16 | 12 | 6 | 55 | 31 | +24 | 44 | Promotion to Segunda Divisão |
| 3 | Académico Viseu B | 34 | 15 | 12 | 7 | 40 | 29 | +11 | 42 | |
| 4 | Os Marialvas | 34 | 13 | 11 | 10 | 44 | 32 | +12 | 37 | |
| 5 | CD Estarreja | 34 | 14 | 9 | 11 | 41 | 30 | +11 | 37 | |
| 6 | SC Penalva do Castelo | 34 | 13 | 8 | 13 | 38 | 33 | +5 | 34 | |
| 7 | AD Ala Arriba | 34 | 12 | 10 | 12 | 38 | 43 | −5 | 34 | |
| 8 | Mortágua FC | 34 | 11 | 11 | 12 | 44 | 41 | +3 | 33 | |
| 9 | GD Gouveia | 34 | 12 | 9 | 13 | 34 | 33 | +1 | 33 | |
| 10 | Lusitano Vildemoinhos | 34 | 13 | 7 | 14 | 30 | 40 | −10 | 33 | |
| 11 | SC Alba | 34 | 12 | 9 | 13 | 41 | 41 | 0 | 33 | |
| 12 | Oliveira do Bairro | 34 | 11 | 11 | 12 | 26 | 35 | −9 | 33 | |
| 13 | GD Mangualde | 34 | 10 | 13 | 11 | 26 | 30 | −4 | 33 | |
| 14 | AA Avanca | 34 | 12 | 8 | 14 | 34 | 44 | −10 | 32 | |
| 15 | UD Seia | 34 | 11 | 9 | 14 | 41 | 65 | −24 | 31 | Relegation to Distritais |
| 16 | CF Oliveirinha | 34 | 9 | 12 | 13 | 26 | 36 | −10 | 30 | Relegation to Distritais |
| 17 | SL Nelas | 34 | 6 | 10 | 18 | 20 | 40 | −20 | 22 | Relegation to Distritais |
| 18 | GD Santacombadense | 34 | 5 | 10 | 19 | 22 | 45 | −23 | 20 | Relegation to Distritais |

== Terceira Divisão – Série D ==
| Pos | Team | Pld | W | D | L | GF | GA | GD | Pts | Promotion or relegation |
|---|---|---|---|---|---|---|---|---|---|---|
| 1 | GD Peniche | 34 | 23 | 5 | 6 | 65 | 23 | +42 | 51 | Promotion to Segunda Divisão |
| 2 | AC Marinhense | 34 | 17 | 11 | 6 | 55 | 21 | +34 | 45 | Promotion to Segunda Divisão |
| 3 | SC Lourinhanense | 34 | 17 | 11 | 6 | 48 | 31 | +17 | 45 | |
| 4 | AC Alcanenense | 34 | 17 | 6 | 11 | 40 | 34 | +6 | 40 | |
| 5 | CD Alcains | 34 | 14 | 12 | 8 | 45 | 27 | +18 | 40 | |
| 6 | Sertanense FC | 34 | 12 | 14 | 8 | 37 | 29 | +8 | 38 | |
| 7 | SC Pombal | 34 | 13 | 12 | 9 | 44 | 35 | +9 | 38 | |
| 8 | União Coimbra | 34 | 14 | 10 | 10 | 49 | 31 | +18 | 38 | |
| 9 | GD Portalegrense | 34 | 13 | 11 | 10 | 56 | 37 | +19 | 37 | |
| 10 | Beneditense CD | 34 | 12 | 9 | 13 | 31 | 32 | −1 | 33 | |
| 11 | GD Argus | 34 | 9 | 15 | 10 | 38 | 44 | −6 | 33 | |
| 12 | Estrela Portalegre | 34 | 11 | 10 | 13 | 35 | 34 | +1 | 32 | |
| 13 | AD Portomosense | 34 | 7 | 18 | 9 | 33 | 37 | −4 | 32 | |
| 14 | SC Leiría e Marrazes | 34 | 11 | 9 | 14 | 36 | 52 | −16 | 31 | |
| 15 | GD Sourense | 34 | 7 | 14 | 13 | 33 | 49 | −16 | 28 | Relegation to Distritais |
| 16 | ADC Proença a Nova | 34 | 9 | 7 | 18 | 30 | 53 | −23 | 25 | Relegation to Distritais |
| 17 | GC Alcobaça | 34 | 3 | 11 | 20 | 12 | 47 | −35 | 17 | Relegation to Distritais |
| 18 | AD Castelo de Vide | 34 | 2 | 5 | 27 | 19 | 90 | −71 | 9 | Relegation to Distritais |

== Terceira Divisão – Série E ==
| Pos | Team | Pld | W | D | L | GF | GA | GD | Pts | Promotion or relegation |
|---|---|---|---|---|---|---|---|---|---|---|
| 1 | CD Olivais e Moscavide | 34 | 20 | 10 | 4 | 61 | 15 | +46 | 50 | Promotion to Segunda Divisão |
| 2 | AC Malveira | 34 | 16 | 13 | 5 | 45 | 22 | +23 | 45 | Promotion to Segunda Divisão |
| 3 | AD Machico | 34 | 15 | 11 | 8 | 37 | 24 | +13 | 41 | |
| 4 | GS Loures | 34 | 15 | 9 | 10 | 51 | 22 | +29 | 39 | |
| 5 | CD Santa Clara | 34 | 15 | 9 | 10 | 55 | 34 | +21 | 39 | |
| 6 | CD Portosantense | 34 | 14 | 11 | 9 | 37 | 29 | +8 | 39 | |
| 7 | CSD Câmara de Lobos | 34 | 12 | 12 | 10 | 31 | 34 | −3 | 36 | |
| 8 | GD Benavente | 34 | 11 | 13 | 10 | 31 | 37 | −6 | 35 | |
| 9 | Atlético Cacém | 34 | 12 | 10 | 12 | 35 | 34 | +1 | 34 | |
| 10 | Operário Açores | 34 | 11 | 10 | 13 | 30 | 43 | −13 | 32 | |
| 11 | GD Samora Correia | 34 | 11 | 10 | 13 | 36 | 46 | −10 | 32 | |
| 12 | SC Praiense | 34 | 11 | 9 | 14 | 32 | 38 | −6 | 31 | |
| 13 | Odivelas FC | 34 | 9 | 12 | 13 | 31 | 41 | −10 | 30 | |
| 14 | AD Camacha | 34 | 9 | 11 | 14 | 29 | 36 | −7 | 29 | |
| 15 | União Almeirim | 34 | 12 | 5 | 17 | 39 | 51 | −12 | 29 | Relegation to Distritais |
| 16 | UD Vilafranquense | 34 | 8 | 9 | 17 | 26 | 46 | −20 | 25 | Relegation to Distritais |
| 17 | Águias Musgueira | 34 | 7 | 9 | 18 | 28 | 49 | −21 | 23 | Relegation to Distritais |
| 18 | SL Cartaxo | 34 | 9 | 5 | 20 | 28 | 61 | −33 | 23 | Relegation to Distritais |

== Terceira Divisão – Série F ==
| Pos | Team | Pld | W | D | L | GF | GA | GD | Pts | Promotion or relegation |
|---|---|---|---|---|---|---|---|---|---|---|
| 1 | União Montemor | 34 | 22 | 7 | 5 | 58 | 16 | +42 | 51 | Promotion to Segunda Divisão |
| 2 | SU Sintrense | 34 | 20 | 7 | 7 | 85 | 32 | +53 | 47 | Promotion to Segunda Divisão |
| 3 | Oriental Lisboa | 34 | 18 | 8 | 8 | 61 | 31 | +30 | 44 | |
| 4 | Leões FC | 34 | 13 | 13 | 8 | 46 | 37 | +9 | 39 | |
| 5 | CD Beja | 34 | 11 | 15 | 8 | 26 | 33 | −7 | 37 | |
| 6 | Seixal FC | 34 | 14 | 9 | 11 | 47 | 28 | +19 | 37 | |
| 7 | AC Salir | 34 | 14 | 9 | 11 | 32 | 27 | +5 | 37 | |
| 8 | Almada AC | 34 | 13 | 9 | 12 | 47 | 45 | +2 | 35 | |
| 9 | AC Alcacerense | 34 | 13 | 9 | 12 | 38 | 45 | −7 | 35 | |
| 10 | Mineiro Aljustrelense | 34 | 11 | 12 | 11 | 32 | 25 | +7 | 34 | |
| 11 | GD Lagoa | 34 | 12 | 9 | 13 | 45 | 46 | −1 | 33 | |
| 12 | Moura AC | 34 | 11 | 11 | 12 | 29 | 34 | −5 | 33 | |
| 13 | Artístico Grandolense | 34 | 10 | 11 | 13 | 37 | 45 | −8 | 31 | |
| 14 | SR Almancilense | 34 | 12 | 7 | 15 | 32 | 36 | −4 | 31 | |
| 15 | GD Quimigal | 34 | 11 | 8 | 15 | 34 | 48 | −14 | 30 | Relegation to Distritais |
| 16 | CF Benfica | 34 | 8 | 11 | 15 | 37 | 54 | −17 | 27 | Relegation to Distritais |
| 17 | SC Ferreirense | 34 | 4 | 8 | 22 | 33 | 82 | −49 | 16 | Relegation to Distritais |
| 18 | Atlético Reguengos de Monsaraz | 34 | 3 | 9 | 22 | 15 | 70 | −55 | 15 | Relegation to Distritais |
