= 1996–97 Terceira Divisão =

Terceira Divisão
- Season: 1996–97

The 1996–97 Terceira Divisão season was the 50th season of the competition and the 7th season of recognised fourth-tier football in Portugal.

== Overview ==
The league was contested by 118 teams in 7 divisions of 10 to 18 teams.

== Terceira Divisão – Série A ==
Pos	Team	Pld	W	D	L	GF	GA	GD	Pts	Promotion or relegation
1	Os Sandinenses	34	19	9	6	49	18	+31	66	Promotion to Segunda Divisão
2	SC Valenciano	34	16	12	6	59	31	+28	60	Promotion to Segunda Divisão
3	FC Amares	34	16	5	13	64	44	+20	53	
4	GD Joane	34	13	12	9	40	32	+8	51	
5	GD Bragança	34	14	7	13	53	57	−4	49	
6	Caçadores das Taipas	34	13	9	12	48	34	+14	48	
7	CA Macedo de Cavaleiros	34	10	17	7	38	30	+8	47	
8	Águias Graça	34	13	8	13	38	38	0	47	
9	Juventude Ronfe	34	12	10	12	51	50	+1	46	
10	SC Vila Pouca de Aguiar	34	13	6	15	41	55	−14	45	
11	Murça SC	34	13	6	15	42	47	−5	45	
12	Âncora Praia FC	34	11	11	12	35	40	−5	44	
13	Vieira SC	34	12	8	14	33	49	−16	44	
14	GD Pevidém	34	10	13	11	45	48	−3	43	
15	SC Maria da Fonte	34	12	7	15	37	54	−17	43	Relegation to Distritais
16	AD Limianos	34	12	6	16	40	45	−5	42	Relegation to Distritais
17	Merelinense FC	34	9	12	13	34	42	−8	39	Relegation to Distritais
18	Santa Maria FC	34	4	10	20	27	60	−33	22	Relegation to Distritais

== Terceira Divisão – Série B ==
Pos	Team	Pld	W	D	L	GF	GA	GD	Pts	Promotion or relegation
1	CD Trofense	34	21	8	5	81	30	+51	71	Promotion to Segunda Divisão
2	GD Ribeirão	34	20	6	8	55	33	+22	66	Promotion to Segunda Divisão
3	União Paredes	34	19	8	7	76	36	+40	65	
4	Pedrouços AC	34	16	7	11	44	41	+3	55	
5	AD São Pedro da Cova	34	15	6	13	49	46	+3	51	
6	ADC Santa Marta de Penaguião	34	14	7	13	37	48	−11	49	
7	SC Castêlo da Maia	34	12	13	9	42	33	+9	49	
8	Dragões Sandinenses	34	13	9	12	47	39	+8	48	
9	UD Valonguense	34	12	11	11	35	34	+1	47	
10	FC Alpendorada	34	12	10	12	35	47	−12	46	
11	Fiães SC	34	13	6	15	49	46	+3	45	
12	SC Senhora da Hora	34	13	6	15	39	48	−9	45	
13	Canelas Gaia FC	34	11	9	14	41	47	−6	42	
14	Vilanovense FC	34	12	6	16	33	45	−12	42	
15	SC Régua	34	11	8	15	42	47	−5	41	Relegation to Distritais
16	Rebordosa AC	34	10	8	16	31	36	−5	38	Relegation to Distritais
17	Amarante FC	34	8	9	17	45	56	−11	33	Relegation to Distritais
18	SC Celoricense	34	2	7	25	27	95	−68	13	Relegation to Distritais

== Terceira Divisão – Série C ==
Pos	Team	Pld	W	D	L	GF	GA	GD	Pts	Promotion or relegation
1	GD Mangualde	34	20	7	7	59	30	+29	67	Promotion to Segunda Divisão
2	SC Esmoriz	34	18	7	9	58	30	+28	61	Promotion to Segunda Divisão
3	Oliveira do Hospital	34	16	7	11	54	38	+16	55	
4	SC Penalva do Castelo	34	15	8	11	52	38	+14	53	
5	Os Marialvas	34	13	13	8	50	42	+8	52	
6	SC São João de Ver	34	15	6	13	57	42	+15	51	
7	Anadia FC	34	13	11	10	45	45	0	50	
8	GD Mealhada	34	14	7	13	55	46	+9	49	
9	AD Fornos de Algodres	34	13	8	13	37	45	−8	47	
10	ADC Lobão	34	13	7	14	39	46	−7	46	
11	AA Avanca	34	12	9	13	45	40	+5	45	
12	GD São Roque	34	12	9	13	49	55	−6	45	
13	Académico Paço	34	13	5	16	43	58	−15	44	
14	CD Estarreja	34	12	8	14	34	51	−17	44	
15	RD Águeda	34	10	12	12	43	39	+4	42	Relegation to Distritais
16	AD São Romão	34	11	7	16	46	58	−12	40	Relegation to Distritais
17	GD Tourizense	34	11	6	17	44	55	−11	39	Relegation to Distritais
18	GD Tabuense	34	4	5	25	23	75	−52	17	Relegation to Distritais

== Terceira Divisão – Série D ==
Pos	Team	Pld	W	D	L	GF	GA	GD	Pts	Promotion or relegation
1	SC Lourinhanense	34	25	7	2	80	18	+62	82	Promotion to Segunda Divisão
2	Estrela Portalegre	34	21	8	5	78	28	+50	71	Promotion to Segunda Divisão
3	AD Portomosense	34	18	9	7	59	33	+26	63	
4	CD Fátima	34	17	8	9	–	–	—	59	
5	CA Riachense	34	15	9	10	39	37	+2	54	
6	SC Pombal	34	15	6	13	48	41	+7	51	
7	UD Rio Maior	34	13	10	11	58	50	+8	49	
8	Sertanense FC	34	13	9	12	39	34	+5	48	
9	AC Marinhense	34	14	4	16	40	43	−3	46	
10	UD Santarém	34	12	8	14	42	53	−11	44	
11	GD Peniche	34	12	7	15	39	41	−2	43	
12	CA Mirandense	34	12	6	16	39	62	−23	42	
13	AD Fazendense	34	10	11	13	38	46	−8	41	
14	GDR Bidoeirense	34	11	8	15	38	51	−13	41	
15	Vitória Cernache	34	9	11	14	27	38	−11	38	Relegation to Distritais
16	GC Alcobaça	34	8	8	18	27	54	−27	32	Relegation to Distritais
17	CD Lousanense	34	6	9	19	27	61	−34	27	Relegation to Distritais
18	UFCI Tomar	34	3	6	25	29	75	−46	15	Relegation to Distritais

== Terceira Divisão – Série E ==
Pos	Team	Pld	W	D	L	GF	GA	GD	Pts	Promotion or relegation
1	Estrela Vendas Novas	34	21	9	4	76	21	+55	72	Promotion to Segunda Divisão
2	O Elvas CAD	34	20	9	5	68	22	+46	69	Promotion to Segunda Divisão
3	1º Maio Sarilhense	34	20	6	8	54	30	+24	66	
4	UD Vilafranquense	34	17	10	7	61	33	+28	61	
5	SU Sintrense	34	17	8	9	59	40	+19	59	
6	CD Portosantense	34	16	6	12	43	34	+9	54	
7	GS Loures	34	14	11	9	53	33	+20	53	
8	CD São Vicente	34	15	8	11	49	40	+9	53	
9	RSC Queluz	34	15	6	13	36	42	−6	51	
10	SG Sacavenense	34	14	9	11	51	42	+9	51	
11	CF Benfica	34	10	14	10	42	36	+6	44	
12	GD Benavente	34	12	7	15	43	40	+3	43	
13	SC Santacruzense	34	11	9	14	51	41	+10	42	
14	SL Olivais	34	10	10	14	40	45	−5	40	
15	CD Mafra	34	10	6	18	38	50	−12	36	Relegation to Distritais
16	UD Santana	34	6	9	19	22	56	−34	27	Relegation to Distritais
17	Calipolense Vila Viçosa	34	4	9	21	23	64	−41	21	Relegation to Distritais
18	Os Elvenses	34	0	2	32	9	49	−40	2	Relegation to Distritais

== Terceira Divisão – Série F ==
Pos	Team	Pld	W	D	L	GF	GA	GD	Pts	Promotion or relegation
1	GD Sesimbra	34	16	14	4	61	37	+24	62	Promotion to Segunda Divisão
2	Seixal FC	34	16	12	6	59	38	+21	60	Promotion to Segunda Divisão
3	Amora FC	34	15	10	9	46	33	+13	55	
4	FC Castrense	34	16	7	11	46	44	+2	55	
5	Lusitano Évora	34	14	9	11	46	49	−3	51	
6	Esperança Lagos	34	14	7	13	54	51	+3	49	
7	GD Pescadores	34	13	9	12	41	38	+3	48	
8	Padernense Clube	34	13	9	12	38	35	+3	48	
9	Palmelense FC	34	14	5	15	38	40	−2	47	
10	Vasco da Gama AC Sines	34	9	18	7	48	43	+5	45	
11	GD Lagoa	34	11	11	12	35	43	−8	44	
12	União Santiago	34	12	8	14	42	33	+9	44	
13	Lusitano VRSA	34	9	16	9	40	36	+4	43	
14	UFCI Setúbal	34	9	14	11	44	55	−11	41	
15	CDR Quarteirense	34	10	7	17	31	47	−16	37	Relegation to Distritais
16	UDR Sambrasense	34	8	11	15	43	52	−9	35	Relegation to Distritais
17	CRD Cabeça Gorda	34	9	6	19	39	55	−16	33	Relegation to Distritais
18	Silves FC	34	6	11	17	28	50	−22	29	Relegation to Distritais

== Terceira Divisão – Série Açores ==
Série Açores – Preliminary League Table

Pos	Team	Pld	W	D	L	GF	GA	GD	Pts
1	SC Lusitânia	18	13	3	2	41	10	+31	42
2	União Micaelense	18	11	5	2	39	18	+21	38
3	Praiense SC	18	8	5	5	20	14	+6	29
4	CD Vila Franca	18	8	5	5	27	19	+8	29
5	Mira Mar SC	18	7	5	6	22	21	+1	26
6	CD Operário	18	7	2	9	19	21	−2	23
7	Os Marítimos	18	5	6	7	18	21	−3	21
8	SC Ideal	18	4	5	9	13	27	−14	17
9	SC Horta	18	2	7	9	14	29	−15	13
10	CD Lajense	18	2	3	13	16	49	−33	9

Série Açores – Promotion Group

Pos	Team	Pld	W	D	L	GF	GA	GD	BP	Pts	Promotion
1	SC Lusitânia	8	7	1	0	19	4	+15	21	43	Promotion to Segunda Divisão
2	União Micaelense	8	3	2	3	16	12	+4	19	30	
3	Praiense SC	8	3	2	3	11	13	−2	15	26	
4	CD Vila Franca	8	2	1	5	12	15	−3	15	22	
5	Mira Mar SC	8	2	0	6	12	26	−14	13	19	

Terceira Divisão - Série Açores Relegation Group

Pos	Team	Pld	W	D	L	GF	GA	GD	BP	Pts	Relegation
1	CD Operário	8	5	2	1	21	7	+14	12	29	
2	SC Ideal	8	4	0	4	9	10	−1	9	21	
3	Os Marítimos	8	2	3	3	10	14	−4	11	20	Relegation to Distritais
4	SC Horta	8	4	1	3	14	14	0	7	20	Relegation to Distritais
5	CD Lajense	8	1	2	5	6	15	−9	5	10	Relegation to Distritais
