= 1993–94 Terceira Divisão =

Terceira Divisão
- Season: 1993–94

The 1993–94 Terceira Divisão season was the 47th season of the competition and the 4th season of recognised fourth-tier football in Portugal.

== Overview ==
The league was contested by 108 teams in 6 divisions of 18 teams in each.

== Terceira Divisão – Série A ==
| Pos | Team | Pld | W | D | L | GF | GA | GD | Pts | Promotion or relegation |
|---|---|---|---|---|---|---|---|---|---|---|
| 1 | AD Limianos | 34 | 22 | 8 | 4 | 68 | 22 | +46 | 52 | Promotion to Segunda Divisão |
| 2 | SC Vianense | 34 | 21 | 8 | 5 | 53 | 22 | +31 | 50 | Promotion to Segunda Divisão |
| 3 | GD Bragança | 34 | 20 | 10 | 4 | 65 | 27 | +38 | 50 | |
| 4 | GD Joane | 34 | 18 | 8 | 8 | 58 | 32 | +26 | 44 | |
| 5 | FC Marinhas | 34 | 13 | 13 | 8 | 38 | 30 | +8 | 39 | |
| 6 | Vieira SC | 34 | 13 | 8 | 13 | 48 | 53 | −5 | 34 | |
| 7 | SC Vila Pouca de Aguiar | 34 | 9 | 16 | 9 | 34 | 38 | −4 | 34 | |
| 8 | Caçadores das Taipas | 34 | 13 | 8 | 13 | 40 | 41 | −1 | 34 | |
| 9 | UD Lanheses | 34 | 11 | 11 | 12 | 37 | 32 | +5 | 33 | |
| 10 | Santa Maria FC | 34 | 7 | 16 | 11 | 36 | 42 | −6 | 30 | |
| 11 | SC Maria da Fonte | 34 | 11 | 8 | 15 | 29 | 38 | −9 | 30 | |
| 12 | Os Sandinenses | 34 | 8 | 14 | 12 | 37 | 44 | −7 | 30 | |
| 13 | Neves FC | 34 | 9 | 10 | 15 | 34 | 45 | −11 | 28 | |
| 14 | Juventude Pedras Salgadas | 34 | 9 | 10 | 15 | 33 | 56 | −23 | 28 | |
| 15 | CA Macedo de Cavaleiros | 34 | 8 | 11 | 15 | 42 | 43 | −1 | 27 | Relegation to Distritais |
| 16 | AD Ponte da Barca | 34 | 9 | 8 | 17 | 25 | 43 | −18 | 26 | Relegation to Distritais |
| 17 | Águias Graça | 34 | 8 | 9 | 17 | 26 | 54 | −28 | 25 | Relegation to Distritais |
| 18 | FC Mogadourense | 34 | 5 | 8 | 21 | 38 | 79 | −41 | 18 | Relegation to Distritais |

== Terceira Divisão – Série B ==
| Pos | Team | Pld | W | D | L | GF | GA | GD | Pts | Promotion or relegation |
|---|---|---|---|---|---|---|---|---|---|---|
| 1 | SC Freamunde | 34 | 23 | 7 | 4 | 70 | 26 | +44 | 53 | Promotion to Segunda Divisão |
| 2 | Amarante FC | 34 | 22 | 5 | 7 | 68 | 39 | +29 | 49 | Promotion to Segunda Divisão |
| 3 | CD Trofense | 34 | 16 | 13 | 5 | 61 | 24 | +37 | 45 | |
| 4 | Rebordosa AC | 34 | 16 | 11 | 7 | 56 | 40 | +16 | 43 | |
| 5 | SC Lamego | 34 | 15 | 9 | 10 | 44 | 32 | +12 | 39 | |
| 6 | CD Arrifanense | 34 | 14 | 11 | 9 | 44 | 32 | +12 | 39 | |
| 7 | SC Castêlo da Maia | 34 | 15 | 9 | 10 | 41 | 36 | +5 | 39 | |
| 8 | Aliados Lordelo | 34 | 11 | 14 | 9 | 43 | 37 | +6 | 36 | |
| 9 | Pedrouços AC | 34 | 13 | 10 | 11 | 51 | 40 | +11 | 36 | |
| 10 | Fiães SC | 34 | 12 | 11 | 11 | 45 | 38 | +7 | 35 | |
| 11 | SC Rio Tinto | 34 | 12 | 9 | 13 | 34 | 38 | −4 | 33 | |
| 12 | SC Régua | 34 | 8 | 15 | 11 | 32 | 39 | −7 | 31 | |
| 13 | Vilanovense FC | 34 | 8 | 14 | 12 | 38 | 35 | +3 | 30 | |
| 14 | AD São Pedro da Cova | 34 | 10 | 9 | 15 | 49 | 58 | −9 | 29 | |
| 15 | SC Esmoriz | 34 | 9 | 9 | 16 | 35 | 49 | −14 | 27 | Relegation to Distritais |
| 16 | FC Alpendorada | 34 | 5 | 9 | 20 | 35 | 80 | −45 | 19 | Relegation to Distritais |
| 17 | ADC Santa Marta de Penaguião | 34 | 5 | 6 | 23 | 21 | 71 | −50 | 16 | Relegation to Distritais |
| 18 | GD São Roque | 34 | 2 | 9 | 23 | 21 | 74 | −53 | 13 | Relegation to Distritais |

== Terceira Divisão – Série C ==
| Pos | Team | Pld | W | D | L | GF | GA | GD | Pts | Promotion or relegation |
|---|---|---|---|---|---|---|---|---|---|---|
| 1 | CD Alcains | 34 | 21 | 7 | 6 | 67 | 31 | +36 | 49 | Promotion to Segunda Divisão |
| 2 | CD Tondela | 34 | 13 | 15 | 6 | 34 | 21 | +13 | 41 | Promotion to Segunda Divisão |
| 3 | Oliveira do Bairro S.C. | 34 | 15 | 10 | 9 | 40 | 27 | +13 | 40 | |
| 4 | AA Avanca | 34 | 16 | 7 | 11 | 53 | 39 | +14 | 39 | |
| 5 | CD Estarreja | 34 | 13 | 11 | 10 | 36 | 32 | +4 | 37 | |
| 6 | SC Penalva do Castelo | 34 | 12 | 13 | 9 | 41 | 32 | +9 | 37 | |
| 7 | Lusitano Vildemoinhos | 34 | 13 | 10 | 11 | 49 | 42 | +7 | 36 | |
| 8 | Anadia FC | 34 | 13 | 9 | 12 | 50 | 43 | +7 | 35 | |
| 9 | AC Cucujães | 34 | 13 | 9 | 12 | 32 | 29 | +3 | 35 | |
| 10 | CA Mirandense | 34 | 14 | 7 | 13 | 52 | 38 | +14 | 35 | |
| 11 | GD Argus | 34 | 14 | 6 | 14 | 33 | 40 | −7 | 34 | |
| 12 | Os Marialvas | 34 | 12 | 10 | 12 | 40 | 44 | −4 | 34 | |
| 13 | Mortágua FC | 34 | 14 | 6 | 14 | 41 | 39 | +2 | 34 | |
| 14 | SL Nelas | 34 | 11 | 11 | 12 | 32 | 32 | 0 | 33 | |
| 15 | SC Alba | 34 | 10 | 11 | 13 | 31 | 33 | −2 | 31 | Relegation to Distritais |
| 16 | CD Gouveia | 34 | 12 | 5 | 17 | 35 | 53 | −18 | 29 | Relegation to Distritais |
| 17 | Académico Paço | 34 | 4 | 10 | 20 | 25 | 66 | −41 | 18 | Relegation to Distritais |
| 18 | SC Celoricense | 34 | 5 | 5 | 24 | 26 | 76 | −50 | 15 | Relegation to Distritais |

== Terceira Divisão – Série D ==
| Pos | Team | Pld | W | D | L | GF | GA | GD | Pts | Promotion or relegation |
|---|---|---|---|---|---|---|---|---|---|---|
| 1 | UD Santarém | 34 | 22 | 10 | 2 | 51 | 17 | +34 | 54 | Promotion to Segunda Divisão |
| 2 | Beneditense CD | 34 | 23 | 7 | 4 | 69 | 21 | +48 | 53 | Promotion to Segunda Divisão |
| 3 | União Almeirim | 34 | 21 | 8 | 5 | 72 | 31 | +41 | 50 | |
| 4 | UFCI Tomar | 34 | 18 | 6 | 10 | 62 | 27 | +35 | 42 | |
| 5 | GD Portalegrense | 34 | 18 | 6 | 10 | 57 | 34 | +23 | 42 | |
| 6 | SC Pombal | 34 | 18 | 6 | 10 | 51 | 32 | +19 | 42 | |
| 7 | ADC Proença a Nova | 34 | 17 | 8 | 9 | 49 | 27 | +22 | 42 | |
| 8 | GD Benavente | 34 | 14 | 8 | 12 | 48 | 36 | +12 | 36 | |
| 9 | UD Vilafranquense | 34 | 14 | 8 | 12 | 53 | 44 | +9 | 36 | |
| 10 | Sertanense FC | 34 | 7 | 17 | 10 | 23 | 22 | +1 | 31 | |
| 11 | SC Leiría e Marrazes | 34 | 10 | 9 | 15 | 35 | 44 | −9 | 29 | |
| 12 | UD Rio Maior | 34 | 9 | 10 | 15 | 43 | 45 | −2 | 28 | |
| 13 | SL Marinha | 34 | 8 | 11 | 15 | 32 | 56 | −24 | 27 | |
| 14 | Escolar Bombarralense | 34 | 9 | 6 | 19 | 30 | 58 | −28 | 24 | |
| 15 | Estrela Portalegre | 34 | 9 | 6 | 19 | 29 | 53 | −24 | 24 | Relegation to Distritais |
| 16 | União Mirense | 34 | 10 | 3 | 21 | 35 | 77 | −42 | 23 | Relegation to Distritais |
| 17 | GC Alcobaça | 34 | 8 | 7 | 19 | 20 | 55 | −35 | 23 | Relegation to Distritais |
| 18 | CR Arronchense | 34 | 1 | 4 | 29 | 17 | 97 | −80 | 6 | Relegation to Distritais |

== Terceira Divisão – Série E ==
| Pos | Team | Pld | W | D | L | GF | GA | GD | Pts | Promotion or relegation |
|---|---|---|---|---|---|---|---|---|---|---|
| 1 | Casa Pia AC | 34 | 23 | 6 | 5 | 71 | 20 | +51 | 52 | Promotion to Segunda Divisão |
| 2 | Praiense SC | 34 | 20 | 9 | 5 | 72 | 23 | +49 | 49 | Promotion to Segunda Divisão |
| 3 | AD Machico | 34 | 20 | 8 | 6 | 53 | 26 | +27 | 48 | |
| 4 | AC Malveira | 34 | 15 | 13 | 6 | 62 | 37 | +25 | 43 | |
| 5 | CD Portosantense | 34 | 15 | 11 | 8 | 42 | 32 | +10 | 41 | |
| 6 | SC Lusitânia | 34 | 15 | 11 | 8 | 54 | 37 | +17 | 41 | |
| 7 | Operário Açores | 34 | 13 | 10 | 11 | 39 | 30 | +9 | 36 | |
| 8 | CSD Câmara de Lobos | 34 | 14 | 7 | 13 | 38 | 34 | +4 | 35 | |
| 9 | SC Angrense | 34 | 12 | 10 | 12 | 54 | 40 | +14 | 34 | |
| 10 | CD Mafra | 34 | 12 | 10 | 12 | 44 | 52 | −8 | 34 | |
| 11 | Alhandra SC | 34 | 12 | 8 | 14 | 49 | 43 | +6 | 32 | |
| 12 | CD São Vicente | 34 | 11 | 9 | 14 | 32 | 43 | −11 | 31 | |
| 13 | CD Santa Clara | 34 | 10 | 9 | 15 | 28 | 52 | −24 | 29 | |
| 14 | Mira Mar SC | 34 | 10 | 9 | 15 | 27 | 40 | −13 | 29 | |
| 15 | SG Sacavenense | 34 | 8 | 12 | 14 | 39 | 55 | −16 | 28 | Relegation to Distritais |
| 16 | CD Ribeira Brava | 34 | 10 | 6 | 18 | 33 | 48 | −15 | 26 | Relegation to Distritais |
| 17 | CF Estremoz | 34 | 2 | 10 | 22 | 20 | 78 | −58 | 14 | Relegation to Distritais |
| 18 | Os Elvenses | 34 | 1 | 8 | 25 | 19 | 86 | −67 | 10 | Relegation to Distritais |

== Terceira Divisão – Série F ==
| Pos | Team | Pld | W | D | L | GF | GA | GD | Pts | Promotion or relegation |
|---|---|---|---|---|---|---|---|---|---|---|
| 1 | Lusitano Évora | 34 | 15 | 15 | 4 | 56 | 29 | +27 | 45 | Promotion to Segunda Divisão |
| 2 | União Santiago | 34 | 16 | 11 | 7 | 50 | 38 | +12 | 43 | Promotion to Segunda Divisão |
| 3 | Vasco da Gama AC Sines | 34 | 17 | 9 | 8 | 58 | 34 | +24 | 43 | |
| 4 | Silves FC | 34 | 16 | 11 | 7 | 56 | 29 | +27 | 43 | |
| 5 | CD Beja | 34 | 16 | 10 | 8 | 54 | 34 | +20 | 42 | |
| 6 | Seixal FC | 34 | 15 | 8 | 11 | 50 | 36 | +14 | 38 | |
| 7 | UFCI Setúbal | 34 | 13 | 10 | 11 | 47 | 38 | +9 | 36 | |
| 8 | Imortal DC | 34 | 10 | 14 | 10 | 28 | 24 | +4 | 34 | |
| 9 | AC Alcacerense | 34 | 11 | 12 | 11 | 38 | 33 | +5 | 34 | |
| 10 | Lusitano VRSA | 34 | 12 | 10 | 12 | 57 | 43 | +14 | 34 | |
| 11 | FC Castrense | 34 | 12 | 9 | 13 | 38 | 40 | −2 | 33 | |
| 12 | Palmelense FC | 34 | 9 | 15 | 10 | 35 | 37 | −2 | 33 | |
| 13 | Padernense Clube | 34 | 12 | 9 | 13 | 38 | 43 | −5 | 33 | |
| 14 | UDR Sambrasense | 34 | 10 | 12 | 12 | 39 | 40 | −1 | 32 | |
| 15 | Moura AC | 34 | 10 | 11 | 13 | 36 | 54 | −18 | 31 | Relegation to Distritais |
| 16 | Mineiro Aljustrelense | 34 | 8 | 10 | 16 | 38 | 50 | −12 | 26 | Relegation to Distritais |
| 17 | GD Lagoa | 34 | 7 | 11 | 16 | 29 | 49 | −20 | 25 | Relegation to Distritais |
| 18 | CA Aldenovense | 34 | 1 | 5 | 28 | 22 | 118 | −96 | 7 | Relegation to Distritais |
