= 1999–2000 Terceira Divisão =

Terceira Divisão
- Season: 1999–2000

The 1999–2000 Terceira Divisão season was the 53rd season of the competition and the 10th season of recognised fourth-tier football in Portugal.

== Overview ==
The league was contested by 118 teams in 7 divisions of 10 to 18 teams.

== Terceira Divisão – Série A ==
Pos	Team	Pld	W	D	L	GF	GA	GD	Pts	Promotion or relegation
1	GD Bragança	34	20	7	7	61	34	+27	67	Promotion to Segunda Divisão
2	GD Pevidém	34	18	7	9	51	32	+19	61	Promotion to Segunda Divisão
3	GD Serzedelo	34	16	5	13	41	37	+4	53	
4	GD Ribeirão	34	15	7	12	39	34	+5	52	
5	Vilaverdense FC	34	11	15	8	40	33	+7	48	
6	AD Limianos	34	12	12	10	42	37	+5	48	
7	SC Maria da Fonte	34	13	8	13	43	36	+7	47	
8	AR São Martinho	34	12	9	13	31	36	−5	45	
9	SC Valenciano	34	11	12	11	38	45	−7	45	
10	Merelinense FC	34	11	11	12	33	42	−9	44	
11	CA Cabeceirense	34	12	8	14	45	52	−7	44	
12	FC Amares	34	11	11	12	45	46	−1	44	
13	ADC Montalegre	34	11	10	13	33	36	−3	43	
14	CD Monção	34	11	10	13	36	35	+1	43	
15	CA Macedo de Cavaleiros	34	11	8	15	35	41	−6	41	Relegation to Distritais
16	Águias Graça	34	9	10	15	34	47	−13	37	Relegation to Distritais
17	Vieira SC	34	11	4	19	29	44	−15	37	Relegation to Distritais
18	Juventude Ronfe	34	8	12	14	40	49	−9	36	Relegation to Distritais

== Terceira Divisão – Série B ==
Pos	Team	Pld	W	D	L	GF	GA	GD	Pts	Promotion or relegation
1	União Paredes	34	23	5	6	86	27	+59	74	Promotion to Segunda Divisão
2	Gondomar SC	34	23	3	8	76	38	+38	72	Promotion to Segunda Divisão
3	AD Lousada	34	22	5	7	66	43	+23	71	
4	Fiães SC	34	17	10	7	59	36	+23	61	
5	Dragões Sandinenses	34	17	8	9	53	36	+17	59	
6	FC Pedras Rubras	34	16	4	14	53	48	+5	52	
7	Pedrouços AC	34	14	9	11	49	37	+12	51	
8	SC Vila Real	34	15	6	13	55	45	+10	51	
9	SC Lamego	34	13	11	10	36	34	+2	50	
10	GD Torre de Moncorvo	34	16	2	16	35	53	−18	50	
11	SC Rio Tinto	34	13	7	14	45	48	−3	46	
12	FC Avintes	34	11	7	16	42	56	−14	40	
13	SC Esmoriz	34	10	9	15	40	51	−11	39	
14	Amarante FC	34	10	7	17	33	53	−20	37	
15	UD Valonguense	34	9	8	17	44	49	−5	35	Relegation to Distritais
16	SC Régua	34	6	12	16	30	54	−24	30	Relegation to Distritais
17	SC Castêlo da Maia	34	6	4	24	27	65	−38	22	Relegation to Distritais
18	ADC Lobão	34	4	5	25	26	80	−54	17	Relegation to Distritais

== Terceira Divisão – Série C ==
Pos	Team	Pld	W	D	L	GF	GA	GD	Pts	Promotion or relegation
1	SC São João de Ver	34	17	10	7	56	31	+25	61	Promotion to Segunda Divisão
2	União Coimbra	34	16	13	5	66	38	+28	61	Promotion to Segunda Divisão
3	GD São Roque	34	18	5	11	45	41	+4	59	
4	CD Estarreja	34	16	9	9	51	40	+11	57	
5	AA Avanca	34	15	10	9	51	34	+17	55	
6	AD Valecambrense	34	16	4	14	56	49	+7	52	
7	Oliveira do Hospital	34	15	7	12	50	42	+8	52	
8	FC Cesarense	34	11	15	8	45	34	+11	48	
9	AD Fornos de Algodres	34	13	9	12	54	49	+5	48	
10	CA Mirandense	34	13	8	13	50	42	+8	47	
11	GD Sourense	34	11	11	12	46	50	−4	44	
12	Anadia FC	34	11	10	13	54	60	−6	43	
13	GD Mangualde	34	11	9	14	33	41	−8	42	
14	Oliveira de Frades	34	12	6	16	41	67	−26	42	
15	GD Mealhada	34	10	8	16	56	65	−9	38	Relegation to Distritais
16	Miléu SC	34	8	11	15	37	45	−8	35	Relegation to Distritais
17	GD Tourizense	34	10	5	19	47	71	−24	35	Relegation to Distritais
18	Os Vouzelenses	34	4	8	22	36	75	−39	20	Relegation to Distritais

== Terceira Divisão – Série D ==
Pos	Team	Pld	W	D	L	GF	GA	GD	Pts	Promotion or relegation
1	CD Fátima	34	23	5	6	82	26	+56	74	Promotion to Segunda Divisão
2	CD Alcains	34	21	8	5	92	44	+48	71	Promotion to Segunda Divisão
3	AD Portomosense	34	19	10	5	56	39	+17	67	
4	Benfica Castelo Branco	34	17	11	6	76	33	+43	62	
5	Estrela Portalegre	34	17	10	7	51	34	+17	61	
6	AD Fazendense	34	16	9	9	57	48	+9	57	
7	GD Ferroviários	34	14	4	16	37	60	−23	46	
8	GD Coruchense	34	12	9	13	51	44	+7	45	
9	UFCI Tomar	34	12	7	15	38	56	−18	43	
10	Vitória Sernache	34	9	16	9	30	35	−5	43	
11	UD Santarém	34	12	5	17	54	77	−23	41	
12	GDR Bidoeirense	34	10	8	16	56	62	−6	38	
13	AC Alcanenense	34	10	8	16	37	46	−9	38	
14	UDR Caranguejeira	34	9	11	14	33	48	−15	38	
15	Os Avisenses	34	7	10	17	35	57	−22	31	Relegation to Distritais
16	CA Riachense	34	7	9	18	36	56	−20	30	Relegation to Distritais
17	RC Ponterrolense	34	7	8	19	42	77	−35	29	Relegation to Distritais
18	União Idanhense	34	7	6	21	36	57	−21	27	Relegation to Distritais

== Terceira Divisão – Série E ==
Pos	Team	Pld	W	D	L	GF	GA	GD	Pts	Promotion or relegation
1	Casa Pia AC	34	24	8	2	76	26	+50	80	Promotion to Segunda Divisão
2	Atlético CP	34	18	6	10	55	38	+17	60	Promotion to Segunda Divisão
3	SU Sintrense	34	13	12	9	48	37	+11	51	
4	CD Portosantense	34	13	12	9	51	41	+10	51	
5	CD Olivais e Moscavide	34	14	7	13	62	45	+17	49	
6	CF Benfica	34	12	12	10	51	48	+3	48	
7	CD São Vicente	34	13	8	13	43	49	−6	47	
8	GD Samora Correia	34	12	10	12	45	49	−4	46	
9	SL Fanhões	34	13	6	15	47	53	−6	45	
10	SG Sacavenense	34	12	8	14	38	42	−4	44	
11	CD Mafra	34	11	10	13	47	55	−8	43	
12	1º Maio Sarilhense	34	10	12	12	42	53	−11	42	
13	O Elvas CAD	34	10	12	12	41	43	−2	42	
14	AD Pontassolense	34	10	12	12	32	39	−7	42	
15	RSC Queluz	34	11	9	14	48	44	+4	42	Relegation to Distritais
16	Atlético Cacém	34	10	7	17	30	50	−20	37	Relegation to Distritais
17	GD Vialonga	34	8	10	16	29	49	−20	34	Relegation to Distritais
18	GS Loures	34	6	11	17	38	62	−24	29	Relegation to Distritais

== Terceira Divisão – Série F ==
Pos	Team	Pld	W	D	L	GF	GA	GD	Pts	Promotion or relegation
1	Seixal FC	34	23	6	5	72	23	+49	75	Promotion to Segunda Divisão
2	Lusitano Évora	34	22	6	6	63	24	+39	72	Promotion to Segunda Divisão
3	GD Pescadores	34	21	8	5	75	31	+44	71	
4	Estrela Vendas Novas	34	19	7	8	52	36	+16	64	
5	CD Beja	34	17	8	9	48	34	+14	59	
6	CD Pinhalnovense	34	13	13	8	55	37	+18	52	
7	Ourique DC	34	15	6	13	59	49	+10	51	
8	CDR Quarteirense	34	14	8	12	55	41	+14	50	
9	SR Almancilense	34	13	9	12	49	39	+10	48	
10	Vasco da Gama AC Sines	34	12	12	10	50	36	+14	48	
11	Palmelense FC	34	12	11	11	43	35	+8	47	
12	Lusitano VRSA	34	12	11	11	50	44	+6	47	
13	Almada AC	34	12	6	16	46	52	−6	42	
14	União Montemor	34	13	2	19	40	56	−16	41	
15	Esperança Lagos	34	11	7	16	53	53	0	40	Relegation to Distritais
16	Mineiro Aljustrelense	34	4	5	25	30	107	−77	17	Relegation to Distritais
17	GD Portel	34	4	3	27	25	92	−67	15	Relegation to Distritais
18	GD Lagoa	34	3	4	27	26	102	−76	13	Relegation to Distritais

== Terceira Divisão – Série Açores ==
Série Açores – Preliminary League Table

Pos	Team	Pld	W	D	L	GF	GA	GD	Pts
1	União Micaelense	18	13	3	2	59	12	+47	42
2	Praiense SC	18	10	6	2	38	16	+22	36
3	FC Madalena	18	7	6	5	37	20	+17	27
4	CD Vila Franca	18	7	5	6	29	24	+5	26
5	CD Santo António	18	6	8	4	18	13	+5	26
6	Águia CD	18	7	3	8	36	35	+1	24
7	Juventude Lajense	18	6	4	8	17	18	−1	22
8	SC Vilanovense	18	4	6	8	26	28	−2	18
9	Fayal SC	18	5	3	10	24	31	−7	18
10	GD Beira	18	1	4	13	13	100	−87	7

Série Açores – Promotion Group

Pos	Team	Pld	W	D	L	GF	GA	GD	BP	Pts	Promotion
1	União Micaelense	8	5	1	2	20	9	+11	42	58	Promotion to Segunda Divisão
2	Praiense SC	8	4	1	3	6	7	−1	38	51	
3	FC Madalena	8	4	1	3	14	9	+5	27	40	
4	CD Santo António	8	3	1	4	8	13	−5	26	36	
5	CD Vila Franca	8	1	2	5	10	20	−10	27	32	

Terceira Divisão - Série Açores Relegation Group

Pos	Team	Pld	W	D	L	GF	GA	GD	BP	Pts	Relegation
1	SC Vilanovense	8	7	0	1	21	5	+16	17	38	
2	Juventude Lajense	8	5	1	2	19	8	+11	20	36	
3	Águia CD	8	3	2	3	13	14	−1	24	35	Relegation to Distritais
4	Fayal SC	8	1	1	6	9	17	−8	18	22	Relegation to Distritais
5	GD Beira	8	1	2	5	11	29	−18	7	12	Relegation to Distritais
