= Braga Football Association =

Sports governing body in Portugal

Associação de Futebol de Braga
- Abbreviation: AF Braga
- Formation: 1922
- Purpose: District Football Association
- Headquarters: Complexo Desportivo da Rodovia
- Location(s): Avenida João Paulo II 4711-852 Braga Portugal
- President: Manuel de Jesus Ribeiro Machado
- Website: afBraga.fpf.pt

The Braga Football Association (Associação de Futebol de Braga, abrv. AF Braga) is the district governing body for the all football competitions in the Portuguese district of Braga since 1992. It is also the regulator of the clubs registered in the district.

Below the Campeonato Nacional de Seniores (Portuguese third level) the competitions are organised at a district level (known in Portuguese as Distritais) with each District Association organising its competitions according to geographical and other factors. AF Braga runs a league competition with three divisions, at the fourth, fifth and sixth levels of the Portuguese football league system, a cup competition known as Taça AF Braga, and a Supercup.

In more general terms the AF Braga currently organises District Championships for football and Futsal for men and women for all age groups including Senior, Junior, Youth, Beginners, Infants and Schools.

== Notable clubs affiliated to Braga FA ==
- Vitória SC
- SC Braga
- Gil Vicente FC
- FC Famalicão
- Moreirense FC
- FC Vizela
- AD Fafe
- AD Esposende
- GD Joane
- Vilaverdense FC
- SC Maria da Fonte
- FC Amares
- Pevidém SC
- Santa Maria FC
- FC Marinhas
- CF Fão
- GD Serzedelo
- GD Ribeirão

== Current Divisions - 2014–15 Season ==
The AF Braga runs the following divisions covering the fourth, fifth and sixth tiers of the Portuguese football league system.

=== Pró-Nacional ===
- Arões Sport Clube
- Associação Desportiva Águias da Graça Futebol Clube
- Associação Desportiva Ninense
- Associação Desportiva Recreativa e Cultural de Terras de Bouro
- Brito Sport Clube
- Desportivo de Ronfe
- Clube Caçadores das Taipas
- Clube Desportivo Celoricense
- Clube Desportivo de Celeirós
- Futebol Clube de Amares
- Futebol Clube de Marinhas
- Grupo Desportivo de Joane
- Grupo Desportivo de Porto D'Ave
- Grupo Desportivo de Serzedelo
- Grupo Desportivo União Torcatense
- Merelinense Futebol Clube
- S. Paio D'Arcos Futebol Clube
- Sport Clube Maria da Fonte

=== Honra – série A ===
- Académico Futebol Clube de Martim
- Associação Desportiva de Carreira
- Associação Desportiva de Esposende
- Associação Recreativa e Cultural Águias de Alvelos
- Centro Desportivo e Cultural de Viatodos
- Dumiense Futebol Clube
- Forjães Sport Clube
- Futebol Clube de Tadim
- Futebol Clube de Roriz
- Grupo de Futebol Clube da Pousa
- Grupo Desportivo de Prado
- MARCA - Movimento Associativo de Recreio, Cultura e Arte
- Soarense Sport Clube
- Sporting Clube de Cabreiros
- União Desportiva São Veríssimo
- União Desportiva Vila Chã

=== Honra – série B ===
- Associação Cultural e Desportiva da Pica
- Centro Recreativo e Popular de Delães
- Clube Desportivo de Ponte
- Desportivo de Arco de Baúlhe
- Desportivo de São Cosme
- Emilianos Futebol Clube
- Grupo Cultural e Desportivo de Regadas
- Grupo Desportivo da Pedralva
- Grupo Desportivo de Caldelas
- Grupo Desportivo de Travassós
- Grupo Desportivo do Gerês
- Grupo Desportivo do Louro
- Grupo Desportivo Recreativo Os Amigos de Urgeses
- Operário Futebol Clube de Antime
- Pevidém Sport Clube
- Ruivanense Atlético Clube

=== 1ª divisão – série A ===
- Associação Cultural Desportiva de Parada de Tibães
- Associação Desportiva de Gondifelos
- Associação Desportiva Juventude de Mouquim
- Bairro Futebol Clube
- Clube de Futebol «Os Ceramista»
- Futebol Clube Ferreirense
- Granja Futebol Clube
- Grupo Desportivo de Fradelos
- Grupo Desportivo de Guisande
- Movimento da Juventude da Póvoa
- Operário Futebol Clube
- Palmeiras Futebol Clube
- Panoiense Futebol Clube
- Sequeirense Futebol Clube
- Sporting Clube da Ucha

=== 1ª divisão – série B ===
- Aboim da Nóbrega Atlético Clube
- Arsenal Clube da Devesa
- Associação Cultural e Recreativa de Guilhofrei
- Clube Desportivo Recreativo Cultural Rendufe Futebol Clube
- Este Futebol Clube
- Futebol Clube de Sobreposta
- Grupo Cultural Desportivo Recreativo de Lanhas
- Grupo Desportivo Bairro da Misericórdia
- Grupo Desportivo de Adaúfe
- Grupo Desportivo e Cultural de Mosteiro
- Grupo Desportivo dos Peões
- Lomarense Ginásio Clube
- São Mamede D'Este Futebol Clube
- Sporting Clube Leões das Enguardas

=== 1ª divisão – série C ===
- Associação Cultural e Desportiva Ases de Santa Eufémia
- Associação Cultural e Desportiva de São Nicolau de Basto
- Associação Desportiva S. Paio Sport Clube
- Atlético Cabeceirense
- Clube Operário de Campelos
- Futebol Clube Prazins
- Grupo Desportivo de Cavez
- Grupo Desportivo de Fareja
- Grupo Desportivo de Longos
- Grupo Desportivo de Selho
- Grupo Desportivo de Silvares
- Grupo Desportivo Recreativo Cultural Os Sandinenses
- Mota Futebol Clube
- Sport Clube Fermilense
- União Desportiva de Airão

== District Championships ==
=== Historic champions ===
Year	Champions
1922–23	SC Braga
1923–24	SC Braga
1924–25	SC Braga
1925–26	SC Braga
1926–27	SC Braga
1927–28	SC Braga
1928–29	SC Braga
1929–30	SC Braga
1930–31	SC Braga
1931–32	SC Braga
1932–33	SC Braga
1933–34	Vitória de Guimarães
1934–35	SC Braga

Year	Champions
1935–36	SC Braga
1936–37	Vitória de Guimarães
1937–38	Vitória de Guimarães
1938–39	Vitória de Guimarães
1939–40	Vitória de Guimarães
1940–41	Vitória de Guimarães
1941–42	Vitória de Guimarães
1942–43	Vitória de Guimarães
1943–44	Vitória de Guimarães
1944–45	Vitória de Guimarães
1945–46	Vitória de Guimarães
1946–47	Vitória de Guimarães

Titles

- SC Braga - 13
- Vitória de Guimarães - 12

=== Men's Seniores Winners ===
SEASON	AFB CUP	DIV. HONRA	1ª DIVISÃO	2ª DIVISÃO	3ª DIVISÃO
1951/52			Esposende SC		
1952/53			FC Fafe		
1953/54			SC Fafe		
1954/55			FC Famalicão	FC Vizela	
1955/56			SC Fafe	AD Limianos	
1956/57			SC Fafe	CA Valdevez	
1957/58			SC Fafe	CC Taipas	
1958/59			AD Fafe	SC Maria da Fonte	
1959/60			Gil Vicente	CF Vianense	
1960/61			D. Monção	CC Taipas	
1961/62			FC Famalicão	FC Vizela	
1962/63			FC Vizela	FC Tadim	
1963/64	FC Vizela		Gil Vicente	G.D. Riopele	
1964/65	Vitória S.C.		Gil Vicente	CO Campelos	
1965/66			FC Vizela	Âncora Praia	
1966/67			GD Riopele	Santa Maria FC	
1967/68	Âncora Praia		AD Fafe	Vieira S.C.	
1968/69	GD Riopele		AD Limianos	Forjães SC	
1969/70	Vieira S.C.		CA Valdevez	CC Taipas	
1970/71	D. Monção		Vieira S.C.	GD Apúlia	
1971/72	Esposende SC		Esposende SC	Cabeceirense	
1972/73	Cabeceirense		Vieira S.C.	Palmeiras FC	GD Joane
1973/74	SC Maria da Fonte		Cabeceirense	Juv. Ronfe	UD Airão
1974/75	SC Maria da Fonte		FC Tadim	UD Airão	Granja FC
1975/76	GD Joane		SC Maria da Fonte	GD Ribeirão	
1976/77	GD Prado		GD Prado	Ruivanense AC	GD Coelima
1977/78	Merelinense F.C.		Merelinense F.C.	Sequeirense FC	GD Silvares
1978/79	SC Maria da Fonte		SC Maria da Fonte	FC Amares	Patrimonense FC
1979/80	Vieira S.C.		CC Taipas	CD Celeirós	GD Texteis TARF
1980/81	CD Maximinense		SC Maria da Fonte	GD Texteis TARF	GD Terras Bouro
1981/82	CC Taipas		Merelinense F.C.	GD Silvares	ADC Gualtar
1982/83	Vieira S.C.		CC Taipas	AD Esposende	Este FC
1983/84	GD Joane		Vieira S.C.	GD Terras Bouro	FC Gandarela
1984/85	Santa Maria FC		Santa Maria FC	GD Serzedelo	UD Vila Chã
1985/86	GD Lagense		CRP Delães	Palmeiras FC	DR Estª. Faro
1986/87	Palmeiras FC		GD Ribeirão	GD Prado	Maikes Fraião
1987/88	AD Águias da Graça		GD Prado	Sequeirense FC	DR Estª. Faro
1988/89	Vilaverdense FC		FC Amares	Águias S. Romão	GCD Armil
1989/90	CD Maximinense		CD Maximinense	GD Alegrienses	AD Gondifelos
1990/91	Vilaverdense FC		Merelinense F.C.	Sandinenses	DR Estª. Faro
1991/92	AD Águias da Graça		Juv Ronfe	GD Pevidém	GDCR Golães
1992/93	Vilaverdense FC		AD Águias da Graça	CDR Esporões	SR Cepanense
1993/94	GD Apúlia		GD Pevidém	Brito SC	Este FC
1994/95	GD Serzedelo	CRP Delães	Bº. Misericórdia	DC Arnoso	ACDR Pico Regalados
1995/96	GD Serzedelo	AD Águias da Graça	Brito SC	FC Negreiros	GDR Urgeses
1996/97	Brito SC	CD Maximinense	GDU Torcatense	Sequeirense FC	
1997/98	Vilaverdense FC	Merelinense F.C.	OFC Antime	Necessidades FC	
1998/99	CD Ponte	SC Maria da Fonte	GD Terras Bouro	GR Gavião	
1999/00	CD Maximinense	CF Fão	GD Celoricense	GD Souto	
2000/01	SC Ucha	AD Águias da Graça	ACD Pica	GDC Cristelo	
2001/02	Santa Maria FC	AD Oliveirense	Forjães SC; GD Fradelos; GD Porto d'Ave; Arco Baúlhe	GD Fonte Santa	
2002/03	GDU Torcatense	Cabeceirense	ADCR Turiz; GD Pedralva; CO Campelos; Águias S. Romão	SC Cabreiros	
2003/04	GD Serzedelo	Merelinense F.C.	Brito SC	CDC Viatodos	
2004/05	FC Amares	FC Amares	GD Prado	ADRC Terras Bouro; GD Lagense	
2005/06	Vieira S.C.	Vieira S.C.	CD Apúlia; ACDR Termas Caldelas; CD Pedralva; GCD Águias Negras	ACD Estrelas Noite; ADC Telhado; GD Travasós	
2006/07	CCD Santa Eulália	GD Serzedelo	AD Laje; CD Os Alegrienses; GD Louro; AD São Paio SC	Catel-Cunha; CCD Desp. Ronfe	
2007/08	CC Taipas	CF Fão	ACDR Pico Regalados; ACD Pica	UD Vila Chã; Dumiense FC; CD Maximinense; Pevidém SC	
2008/09	Santa Maria FC	Santa Maria FC	CD Apúlia; GD Silvares	FC Tadim; GD Gerês; Bairro FC; ACR Guilhofrei	
2009/10	Vilaverdense FC	CC Taipas	Forjães SC; Celoricense	GFC Pousa; Este FC; Desp. S. Cosme; SC Fermilense	
2010/11	CCD Santa Eulália	Vilaverdense FC	AD Águias da Graça; GD Travassós	Antas FC; MJ Póvoa; S. Paio d'Arcos; UDC Sto Adrião	
2011/12	CC Taipas	CCD Santa Eulália	AD Ninense; Brito Sc	GCDR Lanhas; Dumienses FC; GDR Amigos Urgeses	
ÉPOCA	AFB CUP	PRO NACIONAL	DIV. HONRA	1ª DIVISÃO	SUPERCUP
2012/13	Vieira S.C.	AD Ninense	Dumiense FC; GD Pevidém	U.D. S. Veríssimo; S. Mamede d’Este; GCD Regadas	Vieira S.C.
2013/14	Merelinense F.C.	CCD Santa Eulália	S. Paio d'Arcos; FC Amares	MARCA; CD Ponte; GD Pedralva	Merelinense F.C.
2014/15	FC Amares	Torcatense	Forjães SC; GD Travassós	Palmeiras FC; SC Leões Enguardas; AD S. Paio Vizela	Torcatense
2015/16	Merelinense F.C.	Merelinense F.C.	Esposende; Porto d'Ave	Bairro; Prozis Academy; Guisande; Santiago Mascotelos	Merelinense F.C.
2016/17	Esposende	Arões S.C.	Águias da Graça; Pevidém SC	Bairro da Misericórdia; GD Gerês; Ribeirão 1968; CD Celoricense	Arões S.C.

== All-time Primeira Liga table ==
These are the most successful Braga FA clubs in the history of Primeira Liga (as of 02/2021):

Pos	Team	S	Pts	GP	W	D	L	GF	GA	GD	1st	2nd	3rd	4th	5th	6th	T	Debut	Since/ Last App	Best
1	Vitória de Guimarães	75	3119	2222	863	530	829	3136	3134	2	–	–	4	10	12	13	39	1941–42	2007–08	3
2	Braga	64	2728	1956	755	463	738	2657	2704	-47	–	1	2	14	6	3	26	1947–48	1975–76	2
3	Gil Vicente	19	705	638	180	165	293	640	882	-242	–	–	–	–	1	–	1	1990–91	2019–20	5
4	Moreirense	10	382	336	95	97	144	349	465	-106	–	–	–	–	–	1	1	2002–03	2014–15	6
5	Famalicão	7	261	230	67	60	103	258	397	-139	–	–	–	–	–	1	1	1946–47	2019–20	6
6	Fafe	1	41	38	9	14	15	29	47	-18	–	–	–	–	–	–	–	1988–89	1988–89	16
7	Riopele	1	27	30	6	9	15	23	51	-28	–	–	–	–	–	–	–	1977–78	1977–78	15
8	Vizela	1	19	30	4	7	19	31	71	-40	–	–	–	–	–	–	–	1984–85	1984–85	16

== See also ==
- Portuguese District Football Associations
- Portuguese football competitions
- List of football clubs in Portugal
