= Nélito =

Portuguese football manager and player

Personal information
- Full name: Manuel Gomes da Silva
- Date of birth: 24 December 1958 (age 67)
- Place of birth: Braga, Portugal
- Position: Defender

Youth career
- 1974–1976: Vilaverdense
- 1976–1977: Braga

Senior career*
Years	Team	Apps	(Gls)
1977–1990	Braga	160	(1)

Managerial career
- 1994–2004: Amares
- 2004–2006: Vilaverdense
- 2006–2007: Amares
- 2010–2011: Vilaverdense
- 2014–2016: Vilaverdense
- * Club domestic league appearances and goals

Manuel Gomes da Silva (born 24 December 1958), known as Nélito, is a Portuguese football manager and a former player who spent his whole playing career with Braga.

== Career ==
Nélito played on the Portuges Men's Football Under-18 National Team in 1977 and the Men's Football Under-21 National Team in 1980.

Nélito made his professional debut in the Primeira Liga for Braga on 2 April 1978 in a game against Varzim. Over his career, he played 160 games on the top level of Portuguese club football.
