= 2011–12 Terceira Divisão =

Terceira Divisão
- Season: 2011–12

The 2011–12 Terceira Divisão season was the 65th season of the competition and the 22nd season of recognised fourth-tier football in Portugal.

== Overview ==
The league was contested by 93 teams in 8 divisions of 10 to 12 teams.

== Terceira Divisão – Série A ==
Série A – Preliminary league table

Pos	Team	Pld	W	D	L	GF	GA	GD	Pts
1	Santa Maria FC	22	14	3	5	43	19	+24	45
2	GD Joane	22	13	3	6	33	23	+10	42
3	SC Vianense	22	10	11	1	32	14	+18	41
4	GD Bragança	22	11	5	6	30	20	+10	38
5	Vilaverdense FC	22	12	2	8	27	20	+7	38
6	SC Maria da Fonte	22	8	6	8	23	26	−3	30
7	AD Esposende	22	7	5	10	27	40	−13	26
8	SC Melgacense	22	7	4	11	26	37	−11	25
9	FC Marinhas	22	6	7	9	27	32	−5	25
10	FC Amares	22	6	4	12	17	24	−7	22
11	CF Fão	22	4	7	11	22	32	−10	19
12	CD Cerveira	22	4	3	15	20	40	−20	15

Terceira Divisão - Série A Promotion Group

Pos	Team	Pld	W	D	L	GF	GA	GD	BP	Pts	Promotion
1	GD Joane	10	4	5	1	13	7	+6	21	38	Promotion to Segunda Divisão
2	Vilaverdense FC	10	5	2	3	11	8	+3	19	36	Promotion to Segunda Divisão
3	Santa Maria FC	10	2	6	2	12	10	+2	23	35	
4	GD Bragança	10	3	5	2	15	16	−1	19	33	
5	SC Vianense	10	1	4	5	5	13	−8	21	28	
6	SC Maria da Fonte	10	2	4	4	14	16	−2	15	25	

Terceira Divisão - Série A Relegation Group

Pos	Team	Pld	W	D	L	GF	GA	GD	BP	Pts	Relegation
1	FC Marinhas	10	6	2	2	18	11	+7	13	33	
2	AD Esposende	10	6	2	2	19	14	+5	13	33	
3	SC Melgacense	10	5	2	3	18	13	+5	13	30	Relegation to Distritais
4	FC Amares	10	4	0	6	15	20	−5	11	23	Relegation to Distritais
5	CD Cerveira	10	3	2	5	15	16	−1	8	19	Relegation to Distritais
6	CF Fão	10	2	0	8	11	22	−11	10	16	Relegation to Distritais

== Terceira Divisão – Série B ==
Série B – Preliminary league table

Pos	Team	Pld	W	D	L	GF	GA	GD	Pts
1	FC Cesarense	22	13	5	4	34	26	+8	44
2	FC Infesta	22	12	3	7	37	23	+14	39
3	UD Sousense	22	10	8	4	34	20	+14	38
4	AD Grijó	22	10	4	8	24	20	+4	34
5	SC Vila Real	22	9	6	7	26	23	+3	33
6	Rebordosa AC	22	7	10	5	28	19	+9	31
7	GD Serzedelo	22	8	7	7	30	25	+5	31
8	AC Vila Meã	22	7	7	8	25	27	−2	28
9	SC Mêda	22	7	6	9	28	31	−3	27
10	Leça FC	22	5	8	9	25	32	−7	23
11	FC Alpendorada	22	4	5	13	11	36	−25	17
12	SC Lamego	22	2	7	13	22	42	−20	13

Terceira Divisão - Série B Promotion Group

Pos	Team	Pld	W	D	L	GF	GA	GD	BP	Pts	Promotion
1	FC Cesarense	10	8	1	1	14	5	+9	22	47	Promotion to Segunda Divisão
2	FC Infesta	10	6	2	2	15	8	+7	20	40	Promotion to Segunda Divisão
3	UD Sousense	10	5	2	3	11	9	+2	19	36	
4	Rebordosa AC	10	3	1	6	10	13	−3	16	26	
5	SC Vila Real	10	2	1	7	5	12	−7	17	24	
6	AD Grijó	10	1	3	6	9	17	−8	17	23	

Terceira Divisão - Série B Relegation Group

Pos	Team	Pld	W	D	L	GF	GA	GD	BP	Pts	Relegation
1	GD Serzedelo	10	6	2	2	26	13	+13	16	36	
2	AC Vila Meã	10	5	3	2	21	15	+6	14	32	
3	Leça FC	10	5	4	1	14	8	+6	12	31	Relegation to Distritais
4	SC Mêda	10	2	3	5	11	19	−8	14	23	Relegation to Distritais
5	SC Lamego	10	3	1	6	10	22	−12	7	17	Relegation to Distritais
6	FC Alpendorada	10	1	3	6	10	15	−5	9	15	Relegation to Distritais

== Terceira Divisão – Série C ==
Série C – Preliminary league table

Pos	Team	Pld	W	D	L	GF	GA	GD	Pts
1	SC Bustelo	22	11	6	5	43	25	+18	39
2	AA Avanca	22	11	6	5	41	23	+18	39
3	Académico Viseu	22	10	8	4	31	21	+10	38
4	UD Sampedrense	22	11	5	6	34	27	+7	38
5	SC Alba	22	10	7	5	32	16	+16	37
6	AD Nogueirense	22	10	6	6	39	27	+12	36
7	SC Penalva Castelo	22	10	6	6	28	27	+1	36
8	GD Oliveira de Frades	22	8	5	9	27	30	−3	29
9	AD Sanjoanense	22	8	5	9	29	34	−5	29
10	FC Oliveira do Hospital	22	8	3	11	26	31	−5	27
11	GDR Canas Senhorim	22	1	6	15	20	55	−35	9
12	AD Valecambrense	22	1	3	18	24	58	−34	6

Terceira Divisão - Série C Promotion Group

Pos	Team	Pld	W	D	L	GF	GA	GD	BP	Pts	Promotion
1	Académico Viseu	10	6	3	1	15	5	+10	19	40	Promotion to Segunda Divisão
2	SC Bustelo	10	6	2	2	10	10	0	20	40	Promotion to Segunda Divisão
3	AD Nogueirense	10	5	3	2	14	8	+6	18	36	
4	AA Avanca	10	3	1	6	15	15	0	20	30	
5	SC Alba	10	2	2	6	9	20	−11	19	27	
6	UD Sampedrense	10	2	1	7	9	14	−5	19	26	

Terceira Divisão - Série C Relegation Group

Pos	Team	Pld	W	D	L	GF	GA	GD	BP	Pts	Relegation
1	GD Oliveira de Frades	10	7	1	2	27	9	+18	15	37	
2	FC Oliveira do Hospital	10	6	2	2	17	13	+4	14	34	
3	SC Penalva Castelo	10	4	1	5	20	19	+1	18	31	Relegation to Distritais
4	AD Sanjoanense	10	3	3	4	12	14	−2	15	27	Relegation to Distritais
5	GDR Canas Senhorim	10	2	4	4	14	20	−6	5	15	Relegation to Distritais
6	AD Valecambrense	10	2	1	7	10	25	−15	3	10	Relegation to Distritais

== Terceira Divisão – Série D ==
Série D – Preliminary league table

Pos	Team	Pld	W	D	L	GF	GA	GD	Pts
1	GD Sourense	20	10	7	3	30	21	+9	37
2	Benfica Castelo Branco	20	10	5	5	38	17	+21	35
3	UD Tocha	20	9	8	3	28	16	+12	35
4	SC Pombal	20	10	4	6	36	25	+11	34
5	FC Pampilhosa	20	10	2	8	33	27	+6	32
6	AC Marinhense	20	9	4	7	30	23	+7	31
7	Beneditense CD	20	6	11	3	19	17	+2	29
8	GD Peniche	20	7	8	5	15	15	0	29
9	Ginásio de Alcobaça	20	5	6	9	24	21	+3	21
10	CA Riachense	20	1	5	14	14	40	−26	8
11	SC Escolar Bombarralense	20	0	6	14	10	55	−45	6

Terceira Divisão - Série D Promotion Group

Pos	Team	Pld	W	D	L	GF	GA	GD	BP	Pts	Promotion
1	Benfica Castelo Branco	10	7	2	1	19	10	+9	18	41	Promotion to Segunda Divisão
2	FC Pampilhosa	10	7	2	1	21	10	+11	16	39	Promotion to Segunda Divisão
3	GD Sourense	10	4	3	3	15	11	+4	19	34	
4	UD Tocha	10	5	1	4	15	15	0	18	34	
5	SC Pombal	10	2	0	8	9	18	−9	17	23	
6	AC Marinhense	10	1	0	9	6	21	−15	16	19	

Terceira Divisão - Série D Relegation Group

Pos	Team	Pld	W	D	L	GF	GA	GD	BP	Pts	Relegation
1	GD Peniche	8	6	1	1	13	3	+10	15	34	
2	Beneditense CD	8	3	3	2	11	6	+5	15	27	
3	Ginásio de Alcobaça	8	4	2	2	14	8	+6	12	26	Relegation to Distritais
4	CA Riachense	8	2	3	3	10	14	−4	4	13	Relegation to Distritais
5	SC Escolar Bombarralense	8	0	1	7	0	17	−17	3	4	Relegation to Distritais

== Terceira Divisão – Série E ==
Série E – Preliminary league table

Pos	Team	Pld	W	D	L	GF	GA	GD	Pts
1	AD Oeiras	22	12	7	3	34	19	+15	43
2	SU Sintrense	22	11	5	6	35	22	+13	38
3	CA Pêro Pinheiro	22	9	10	3	35	21	+14	37
4	CF Benfica	22	11	4	7	31	25	+6	37
5	Real SC Massama	22	10	4	8	28	28	0	34
6	Casa Pia AC	22	9	6	7	31	23	+8	33
7	Eléctrico FC	22	8	8	6	21	18	+3	32
8	SG Sacavenense	22	8	6	8	34	26	+8	30
9	SL Cartaxo	22	7	5	10	28	43	−15	26
10	Olímpico Montijo	22	4	8	10	32	41	−9	20
11	GD Alcochetense	22	3	8	11	21	33	−12	17
12	O Elvas CAD	22	3	3	16	23	54	−31	12

Terceira Divisão - Série E Promotion Group

Pos	Team	Pld	W	D	L	GF	GA	GD	BP	Pts	Promotion
1	CF Benfica	10	6	2	2	15	11	+4	19	39	Promotion to Segunda Divisão
2	AD Oeiras	10	3	4	3	9	11	−2	22	35	Promotion to Segunda Divisão
3	Casa Pia AC	10	5	2	3	12	11	+1	17	34	
4	CA Pêro Pinheiro	10	3	4	3	11	12	−1	19	32	
5	Real SC Massama	10	3	3	4	11	9	+2	17	29	
6	SU Sintrense	10	1	3	6	6	10	−4	19	25	

Terceira Divisão - Série E Relegation Group

Pos	Team	Pld	W	D	L	GF	GA	GD	BP	Pts	Relegation
1	SG Sacavenense	10	7	3	0	23	5	+18	15	39	
2	Eléctrico FC	10	3	6	1	15	12	+3	16	31	
3	SL Cartaxo	10	4	2	4	16	16	0	13	27	Relegation to Distritais
4	GD Alcochetense	10	4	5	1	19	10	+9	9	26	Relegation to Distritais
5	Olímpico Montijo	10	2	1	7	14	22	−8	10	17	Relegation to Distritais
6	O Elvas CAD	10	1	1	8	6	28	−22	6	10	Relegation to Distritais

== Terceira Divisão – Série F ==
Série F – Preliminary league table

Pos	Team	Pld	W	D	L	GF	GA	GD	Pts
1	SC Farense	22	17	5	0	52	17	+35	56
2	CF Esperança de Lagos	22	11	4	7	36	25	+11	37
3	GD Sesimbra	22	10	5	7	30	25	+5	35
4	CDR Quarteirense	22	11	2	9	27	25	+2	35
5	UD Messinense	22	10	4	8	28	25	+3	34
6	Mineiro Aljustrelense	22	10	4	8	33	31	+2	34
7	GD Fabril Barreiro	22	10	3	9	36	29	+7	33
8	G.D. Lagoa	22	8	6	8	21	19	+2	30
9	GUS Montemor	22	7	8	7	23	22	+1	29
10	GD Pescadores	22	6	5	11	24	37	−13	23
11	Redondense FC	22	5	4	13	21	32	−11	19
12	Despertar SC	22	0	4	18	7	51	−44	4

Terceira Divisão - Série F Promotion Group

Pos	Team	Pld	W	D	L	GF	GA	GD	BP	Pts	Promotion
1	SC Farense	10	5	3	2	21	13	+8	28	46	Promotion to Segunda Divisão
2	CDR Quarteirense	10	6	2	2	17	9	+8	18	38	Promotion to Segunda Divisão
3	CF Esperança Lagos	10	4	3	3	14	10	+4	19	34	
4	Mineiro Aljustrelense	10	3	4	3	14	13	+1	17	30	
5	GD Sesimbra	10	3	2	5	6	13	−7	18	29	
6	UD Messinense	10	1	2	7	9	23	−14	17	22	

Terceira Divisão - Série F Relegation Group

Pos	Team	Pld	W	D	L	GF	GA	GD	BP	Pts	Relegation
1	GD Fabril Barreiro	10	6	1	3	19	16	+3	17	36	
2	GUS Montemor	10	6	2	2	24	10	+14	15	35	
3	G.D. Lagoa	10	5	2	3	20	14	+6	15	32	Relegation to Distritais
4	GD Pescadores	10	6	1	3	18	12	+6	12	31	Relegation to Distritais
5	Redondense FC	10	0	4	6	7	18	−11	10	14	Relegation to Distritais
6	Despertar SC	10	2	0	8	10	28	−18	2	8	Relegation to Distritais

== Terceira Divisão – Série Açores ==
Série Açores – Preliminary league table

Pos	Team	Pld	W	D	L	GF	GA	GD	Pts
1	SC Lusitânia	18	13	4	1	31	13	+18	43
2	SC Praiense	18	12	2	4	34	10	+24	38
3	Santiago FC	18	11	4	3	40	13	+27	37
4	Prainha FC	18	8	5	5	30	30	0	29
5	Boavista de São Mateus	18	6	9	3	14	12	+2	27
6	SC Guadalupe	18	6	2	10	23	26	−3	20
7	SC Ideal	18	4	7	7	27	26	+1	19
8	União Micaelense	18	3	6	9	16	31	−15	15
9	Fayal SC	18	3	4	11	22	41	−19	13
10	Águia CD	18	1	3	14	9	44	−35	6

Terceira Divisão - Série Açores Promotion Group

Pos	Team	Pld	W	D	L	GF	GA	GD	BP	Pts	Promotion
1	SC Lusitânia	6	5	1	0	12	6	+6	43	59	Promotion to Segunda Divisão
2	SC Praiense	6	3	0	3	11	8	+3	38	47	
3	Santiago FC	6	3	1	2	9	7	+2	37	47	
4	Prainha FC	6	0	0	6	3	14	−11	29	29	

Terceira Divisão - Série Açores Relegation Group

Pos	Team	Pld	W	D	L	GF	GA	GD	BP	Pts	Relegation
1	SC Ideal	10	9	0	1	31	13	+18	19	46	
2	Boavista de São Mateus	10	4	2	4	14	16	−2	27	41	
3	SC Guadalupe	10	5	1	4	19	13	+6	20	36	Relegation to Distritais
4	Fayal SC	10	3	1	6	12	17	−5	13	23	Relegation to Distritais
5	União Micaelense	10	2	2	6	13	22	−9	15	23	Relegation to Distritais
6	Águia CD	10	4	0	6	13	21	−8	6	18	Relegation to Distritais

== Terceira Divisão – Série Madeira ==
Série Madeira – Preliminary league table

Pos	Team	Pld	W	D	L	GF	GA	GD	Pts
1	AD Pontassolense	22	15	4	3	45	15	+30	49
2	CF Caniçal	22	15	3	4	53	21	+32	48
3	AD Machico	22	13	7	2	38	20	+18	46
4	CD Portosantense	22	13	2	7	52	27	+25	41
5	CSD Câmara de Lobos	22	12	3	7	36	28	+8	39
6	Estrela da Calheta FC	22	7	6	9	26	31	−5	27
7	1º Maio Funchal	22	7	4	11	27	35	−8	25
8	GR Cruzado Canicense	22	6	4	12	18	32	−14	22
9	CF Andorinha	22	6	3	13	29	46	−17	21
10	AD Porto Cruz	22	5	5	12	25	41	−16	20
11	ADCR Bairro da Argentina	22	5	4	13	20	49	−29	19
12	UD Santana	22	4	3	15	21	45	−24	15

Terceira Divisão - Série Madeira Promotion Group

Pos	Team	Pld	W	D	L	GF	GA	GD	BP	Pts	Promotion
1	AD Pontassolense	10	8	0	2	26	13	+13	25	49	Promotion to Segunda Divisão
2	CF Caniçal	10	7	1	2	35	19	+16	24	46	
3	CD Portosantense	10	5	4	1	25	15	+10	21	40	
4	CSD Câmara de Lobos	10	1	4	5	16	28	−12	20	27	
5	AD Machico	10	0	2	8	14	31	−17	23	25	
6	Estrela de Calheta FC	10	2	3	5	15	25	−10	14	23	

Terceira Divisão - Série Madeira Relegation Group

Pos	Team	Pld	W	D	L	GF	GA	GD	BP	Pts	Relegation
1	GR Cruzado Canicense	10	4	5	1	21	15	+6	11	28	
2	AD Porto Cruz	10	4	3	3	12	14	−2	10	25	
3	CF Andorinha	10	2	6	2	16	15	+1	11	23	
4	ADCR Bairro da Argentina	10	2	6	2	16	14	+2	10	22	Relegation to Distritais
5	UD Santana	10	3	4	3	13	13	0	8	21	Relegation to Distritais
6	1º Maio Funchal	10	0	6	4	14	21	−7	13	19	Relegation to Distritais
