= F.C. Marinhas =

Portuguese football club

Marinhas
- Full name: Futebol Clube de Marinhas
- Founded: 1967
- Ground: Complexo Desportivo de Marinhas; Marinhas, Esposende; Portugal
- Capacity: 3,500
- Chairman: Francisco Ramalho Figueiredo
- League: Terceira Divisão Série A
Home colours

Futebol Clube de Marinhas (abbreviated as FC Marinhas) is a Portuguese football club based in Marinhas, Esposende in the district of Braga.

== Background ==
FC Marinhas currently plays in the Terceira Divisão Série A which is the fourth tier of Portuguese football. The club was founded in 1967 and they play their home matches at the Complexo Desportivo de Marinhas in Marinhas, Esposende. The stadium is able to accommodate 3,500 spectators.

The club is affiliated to Associação de Futebol de Braga and has competed in the AF Braga Taça. The club has also entered the national cup competition known as Taça de Portugal on occasions.

== Season to season ==
Season	Level	Division	Section	Place	Movements
1990–91	Tier 5	Distritais	AF Braga – 1ª Divisão A		
1991–92	Tier 5	Distritais	AF Braga – 1ª Divisão A		Promoted
1992–93	Tier 4	Terceira Divisão	Série A	4th	
1993–94	Tier 4	Terceira Divisão	Série A	5th	
1994–95	Tier 4	Terceira Divisão	Série A	4th	
1995–96	Tier 4	Terceira Divisão	Série A	17th	Relegated
1996–97	Tier 5	Distritais	AF Braga – Honra		
1997–98	Tier 5	Distritais	AF Braga – Honra		
1998–99	Tier 5	Distritais	AF Braga – Honra B	5th	
1999–2000	Tier 5	Distritais	AF Braga – Honra 1		
2000–01	Tier 5	Distritais	AF Braga – Honra A	4th	
2001–02	Tier 5	Distritais	AF Braga – Honra A	1st	Promoted
2002–03	Tier 4	Terceira Divisão	Série A	15th	Relegated
2003–04	Tier 5	Distritais	AF Braga – Honra A	5th	
2004–05	Tier 5	Distritais	AF Braga – Honra A	3rd	
2005–06	Tier 5	Distritais	AF Braga – Honra A	1st	Promoted
2006–07	Tier 4	Terceira Divisão	Série A	5th	
2007–08	Tier 4	Terceira Divisão	Série A – 1ª Fase	7th	Relegation Group
	Tier 4	Terceira Divisão	Série A – Sub-Série A1	1st	
2008–09	Tier 4	Terceira Divisão	Série A – 1ª Fase	11th	Relegation Group
	Tier 4	Terceira Divisão	Série A – Sub-Série A1	2nd	
2009–10	Tier 4	Terceira Divisão	Série A – 1ª Fase	11th	Relegation Group
	Tier 4	Terceira Divisão	Série A Últimos	5th	Relegated
2010–11	Tier 5	Distritais	AF Braga – Honra	2nd	Promoted
2011–12	Tier 4	Terceira Divisão	Série A – 1ª Fase	9th	Relegation Group
	Tier 4	Terceira Divisão	Série A Últimos	1st	

== Honours ==
- AF Braga Honra A: 2001/2002 and 2005/06
