= SC Maria da Fonte =

Portuguese football club

Maria da Fonte
- Full name: Sport Clube Maria da Fonte
- Founded: 1925; 101 years ago
- Ground: Campo dos Moínhos Novos; Póvoa de Lanhoso; Portugal
- Capacity: 1,500
- League: Terceira Divisão Série A
- Website: http://www.mariadafonte.pt.vu
Home colours

Sport Clube Maria da Fonte (abbreviated as SC Maria da Fonte) is a Portuguese football club based in Póvoa de Lanhoso in the district of Braga.

== Background ==
SC Maria da Fonte currently plays in the Terceira Divisão Série A which is the fourth tier of Portuguese football. The club was founded in 1925 and they play their home matches at the Campo dos Moínhos Novos in Póvoa de Lanhoso. The stadium is able to accommodate 1,500 spectators.

The club is affiliated to Associação de Futebol de Braga and has competed in the AF Braga Taça. The club has also entered the national cup competition known as Taça de Portugal on occasions.

== Season to season ==
Season	Level	Division	Section	Place	Movements
1990–91	Tier 4	Terceira Divisão	Série A	3rd	
1991–92	Tier 4	Terceira Divisão	Série A	10th	
1992–93	Tier 4	Terceira Divisão	Série A	13th	
1993–94	Tier 4	Terceira Divisão	Série A	11th	
1994–95	Tier 4	Terceira Divisão	Série A	10th	
1995–96	Tier 4	Terceira Divisão	Série A	3rd	
1996–97	Tier 4	Terceira Divisão	Série A	15th	
1997–98	Tier 4	Terceira Divisão	Série A	17th	Relegated
1998–99	Tier 5	Distritais	AF Braga – Honra	1st	Promoted
1999–2000	Tier 4	Terceira Divisão	Série A	5th	
2000–01	Tier 4	Terceira Divisão	Série A	3rd	
2001–02	Tier 4	Terceira Divisão	Série A	5th	
2002–03	Tier 4	Terceira Divisão	Série A	6th	
2003–04	Tier 4	Terceira Divisão	Série A	12th	
2004–05	Tier 4	Terceira Divisão	Série A	12th	
2005–06	Tier 4	Terceira Divisão	Série A	1st	Promoted
2006–07	Tier 3	Segunda Divisão	Série Norte	9th	
2007–08	Tier 3	Segunda Divisão	Série A – 1ª Fase	7th	Relegation Group
	Tier 3	Segunda Divisão	Série A- Sub-Série A1	1st	
2008–09	Tier 3	Segunda Divisão	Série A – 1ª Fase	11th	Relegation Group
	Tier 3	Segunda Divisão	Série A Últimos	5th	Relegated
2009–10	Tier 4	Terceira Divisão	Série A – 1ª Fase	8th	Relegation Group
	Tier 4	Terceira Divisão	Série A Últimos	2nd	
2010–11	Tier 4	Terceira Divisão	Série A – 1ª Fase	7th	Relegation Group
	Tier 4	Terceira Divisão	Série A Últimos	1st	
2011–12	Tier 4	Terceira Divisão	Série A – 1ª Fase	6th	Promotion Group
	Tier 4	Terceira Divisão	Série A Fase Final	6th	

== League and cup history ==
Season	I	II	III	IV	V	Pts.	Pl.	W	L	T	GS	GA	Diff.	Portuguese Cup
1990–91				3 (A)		43 pts	34	17	9	8	40	19	21	-
1991–92				10 (A)		35 pts	34	10	15	9	31	34	−3	-
1992–93				13 (A)		33 pts	34	10	13	11	26	37	−11	-
1993–94				11 (A)		30 pts	34	11	8	15	29	38	−9	-
1994–95				3 (A)		34 pts	34	12	10	12	39	39	0	-
1995–96				4 (C)		64 pts	34	19	7	8	52	31	21	-
1996–97				15 (A)		43 pts	34	12	7	15	37	54	−17	-
1997–98				17 (A)		32 pts	34	8	8	18	37	57	−20	-
1998–99					1									
1999–2000				5 (A)										
2000–01				3 (A)										
2001–02				5 (A)										
2002–03				6 (A)										
2003–04				12 (A)										
2004–05				12 (A)										
2005–06				1 (A)										
2006–07			9 (N)											
2007–08			7/1 (A)											
2008–09			11/5 (A)											
2009–10				8/1 (A)										
2010–11				7/1 (A)										
2011–12				6/6 (A)										

== Honours ==
- Terceira Divisão: 2005/06 (Série A)
- AF Braga Taça: 1973/74, 1974/75, 1978/79
