= C.F. Fão =

Portuguese football club

Fão
- Full name: Clube de Futebol de Fão
- Founded: 1957
- Ground: Complexo Desportivo Clube de Futebol de Fão; Fão, Esposende; Portugal
- Capacity: 724
- Chairman: João André Ribeiro Seara
- League: Terceira Divisão Série A
Home colours

Clube de Futebol de Fão (abbreviated as CF Fão) is a Portuguese football club based in Fão, Esposende in the district of Braga.

== Background ==
CF Fão currently plays in the Terceira Divisão Série A which is the fourth tier of Portuguese football. The club was founded in 1957 and they play their home matches at the Complexo Desportivo Clube de Futebol de Fão in Fão, Esposende. The stadium is able to accommodate 724 spectators.

The club is affiliated to Associação de Futebol de Braga and has competed in the AF Braga Taça. The club has also entered the national cup competition known as Taça de Portugal on a few occasions.

== Season to season ==
Season	Level	Division	Section	Place	Movements
1990–91	Tier 5	Distritais	AF Braga – 1ª Divisão A		
1991–92	Tier 5	Distritais	AF Braga – 1ª Divisão A		
1992–93	Tier 5	Distritais	AF Braga – 1ª Divisão A		
1993–94	Tier 5	Distritais	AF Braga – 1ª Divisão A		
1994–95	Tier 5	Distritais	AF Braga – 1ª Divisão A		
1995–96	Tier 5	Distritais	AF Braga – Honra		
1996–97	Tier 5	Distritais	AF Braga – Honra		Relegated
1997–98	Tier 6	Distritais	AF Braga – 1ª Divisão A		
1998–99	Tier 6	Distritais	AF Braga – 1ª Divisão A		Promoted
1999–2000	Tier 5	Distritais	AF Braga – Honra 1		Promoted
2000–01	Tier 4	Terceira Divisão	Série A	10th	
2001–02	Tier 4	Terceira Divisão	Série A	16th	Relegated
2002–03	Tier 5	Distritais	AF Braga – Honra 1	3rd	
2003–04	Tier 5	Distritais	AF Braga – Honra A	12th	
2004–05	Tier 5	Distritais	AF Braga – Honra A	15th	Relegated
2005–06	Tier 6	Distritais	AF Braga – 1ª Divisão A		Promoted
2006–07	Tier 5	Distritais	AF Braga – Honra A	3rd	
2007–08	Tier 5	Distritais	AF Braga – Honra	1st	Promoted
2008–09	Tier 4	Terceira Divisão	Série A – 1ª Fase	8th	Relegation Group
	Tier 4	Terceira Divisão	Série A – Sub-Série A2	1st	
2009–10	Tier 4	Terceira Divisão	Série A – 1ª Fase	9th	Relegation Group
	Tier 4	Terceira Divisão	Série A Últimos	3rd	
2010–11	Tier 4	Terceira Divisão	Série A – 1ª Fase	5th	Promotion Group
	Tier 4	Terceira Divisão	Série A Fase Final	5th	
2011–12	Tier 4	Terceira Divisão	Série A – 1ª Fase	11th	Relegation Group
	Tier 4	Terceira Divisão	Série A Últimos	6th	Relegated

== Honours ==
- AF Braga Divisão de Honra: 1999/00, 2007/08
