= G.D. Serzedelo =

Portuguese football club

Serzedelo
- Full name: Grupo Desportivo Serzedelo
- Founded: 16 April 1967; 58 years ago
- Ground: Campo das Oliveiras; Serzedelo, Guimarães; Portugal
- Capacity: 3,000
- Chairman: José António Antunes
- League: Terceira Divisão Série B
Home colours

Grupo Desportivo Serzedelo (abbreviated as GD Serzedelo) is a Portuguese football club based in Serzedelo, Guimarães in the district of Braga.

== Background ==
GD Serzedelo currently plays in the Terceira Divisão Série B which is the fourth tier of Portuguese football. The club was founded in 1967 and they play their home matches at the Campo das Oliveiras in Serzedelo, Guimarães. The stadium is able to accommodate 3,000 spectators.

The club is affiliated to Associação de Futebol de Braga and has competed in the AF Braga Taça. The club has also entered the national cup competition known as Taça de Portugal on occasions.

== Season to season ==
Season	Level	Division	Section	Place	Movements
1990–91	Tier 5	Distritais	AF Braga – 1ª Divisão B		
1991–92	Tier 5	Distritais	AF Braga – 1ª Divisão B		
1992–93	Tier 5	Distritais	AF Braga – 1ª Divisão B		
1993–94	Tier 5	Distritais	AF Braga – 1ª Divisão B		
1994–95	Tier 5	Distritais	AF Braga – Honra		
1995–96	Tier 5	Distritais	AF Braga – Honra		
1996–97	Tier 5	Distritais	AF Braga – Honra		Promoted
1997–98	Tier 4	Terceira Divisão	Série A	8th	
1998–99	Tier 4	Terceira Divisão	Série B	14th	
1999–2000	Tier 4	Terceira Divisão	Série A	4th	
2000–01	Tier 4	Terceira Divisão	Série A	4th	
2001–02	Tier 4	Terceira Divisão	Série B	8th	
2002–03	Tier 4	Terceira Divisão	Série B	16th	Relegated
2003–04	Tier 5	Distritais	AF Braga – Honra B	3rd	
2004–05	Tier 5	Distritais	AF Braga – Honra B	7th	
2005–06	Tier 5	Distritais	AF Braga – Honra B	2nd	
2006–07	Tier 5	Distritais	AF Braga – Honra B	1st	Promoted
2007–08	Tier 4	Terceira Divisão	Série B – 1ª Fase	6th	Promotion Group
	Tier 4	Terceira Divisão	Série B Fase Final	6th	
2008–09	Tier 4	Terceira Divisão	Série B – 1ª Fase	8th	Relegation Group
	Tier 4	Terceira Divisão	Série B – Sub-Série B2	1st	
2009–10	Tier 4	Terceira Divisão	Série B – 1ª Fase	11th	Relegation Group
	Tier 4	Terceira Divisão	Série B Últimos	2nd	
2010–11	Tier 4	Terceira Divisão	Série B – 1ª Fase	6th	Promotion Group
	Tier 4	Terceira Divisão	Série B Fase Final	6th	
2011–12	Tier 4	Terceira Divisão	Série B – 1ª Fase	7th	Relegation Group
	Tier 4	Terceira Divisão	Série B Últimos	1st	

== Honours ==
- AF Braga Honra B: 2006–07
