= Santa Maria F.C. =

Portuguese football club

Santa Maria FC
- Full name: Santa Maria Futebol Clube
- Founded: 1943; 83 years ago
- Ground: Estádio da Devesas; Galegos (Santa Maria), Barcelos, Portugal
- Capacity: 4,000
- League: Campeonato Nacional de Seniores
Home colours

Santa Maria Futebol Clube (abbreviated as Santa Maria FC) is a Portuguese football club based in Galegos (Santa Maria), Barcelos in the district of Braga.

== Background ==
Santa Maria FC currently plays in the Campeonato Nacional de Seniores Série A which is the third tier of Portuguese football. The club was founded in 1943 and they play their home matches at the Estádio da Devesas in Galegos (Santa Maria), Barcelos.

The club is affiliated to Associação de Futebol de Braga and has competed in the AF Braga Taça. The club has also entered the national cup competition known as Taça de Portugal on occasions.

== Season to season ==
Season	Level	Division	Section	Place	Movements
1990–91	Tier 4	Terceira Divisão	Série A	7th	
1991–92	Tier 4	Terceira Divisão	Série A	6th	
1992–93	Tier 4	Terceira Divisão	Série A	3rd	
1993–94	Tier 4	Terceira Divisão	Série A	10th	
1994–95	Tier 4	Terceira Divisão	Série A	2nd	Promoted
1995–96	Tier 3	Segunda Divisão	Série Norte	18th	Relegated
1996–97	Tier 4	Terceira Divisão	Série A	18th	Relegated
1997–98	Tier 5	Distritais	AF Braga – Honra		Relegated
1998–99	Tier 6	Distritais	AF Braga – 1ª Divisão B	1st	Promoted
1999–2000	Tier 5	Distritais	AF Braga – Honra Série 1		
2000–01	Tier 5	Distritais	AF Braga – Honra Série A	8th	
2001–02	Tier 5	Distritais	AF Braga – Honra Série A	3rd	
2002–03	Tier 5	Distritais	AF Braga – Honra Série 1	1st	Promoted
2003–04	Tier 4	Terceira Divisão	Série A	5th	
2004–05	Tier 4	Terceira Divisão	Série A	15th	Relegated
2005–06	Tier 5	Distritais	AF Braga – Honra	2nd	
2006–07	Tier 5	Distritais	AF Braga – Honra	2nd	
2007–08	Tier 5	Distritais	AF Braga – Honra	6th	
2008–09	Tier 5	Distritais	AF Braga – Honra	1st	Promoted
2009–10	Tier 4	Terceira Divisão	Série B – 1ª Fase	8th	Relegation Group
	Tier 4	Terceira Divisão	Série A Últimos	2nd	
2010–11	Tier 4	Terceira Divisão	Série B – 1ª Fase	10th	Relegation Group
	Tier 4	Terceira Divisão	Série A Últimos	3rd	
2011–12	Tier 4	Terceira Divisão	Série A – 1ª Fase	1st	Promotion Group
	Tier 4	Terceira Divisão	Série A Fase Final	3rd	Promoted
2013–14	Tier 3	Campeonato Nacional de Seniores	Série A – 1ª Fase	6th	Relegation Group
	Tier 3	Campeonato Nacional de Seniores	Série A – Relegation		

== Honours ==
- AF Braga Divisão de Honra: 1996/97, 2008/09
- AF Braga Primeira Divisão: 1984/85
- AF Braga Taça: 1984/85, 2001/02, 2008/09
