= G.D. Joane =

Portuguese football club

GD Joane
- Full name: Grupo Desportivo de Joane
- Founded: 1930
- Ground: Estádio de Barreiros; Joane, Vila Nova de Famalicão, Portugal
- Capacity: 1,500
- League: Terceira Divisão Série A
- Website: https://grupodesportivodejoane.blogs.sapo.pt/
Home colours

Grupo Desportivo de Joane (abbreviated as GD Joane) is a Portuguese football club based in Joane, Vila Nova de Famalicão in the district of Braga.

== Background ==
GD Joane currently plays in the Terceira Divisão Série A which is the fourth tier of Portuguese football. The club was founded in 1930 and they play their home matches at the Estádio de Barreiros in Joane, Vila Nova de Famalicão.

The club is affiliated to Associação de Futebol de Braga and has competed in the AF Braga Taça. The club has also entered the national cup competition known as Taça de Portugal on many occasions.

== Season to season ==
Season	Level	Division	Section	Place	Movements
1990–91	Tier 3	Segunda Divisão	Série Norte	7th	
1991–92	Tier 3	Segunda Divisão	Série Norte	15th	Relegated
1992–93	Tier 4	Terceira Divisão	Série A	8th	
1993–94	Tier 4	Terceira Divisão	Série A	4th	
1994–95	Tier 4	Terceira Divisão	Série A	7th	
1995–96	Tier 4	Terceira Divisão	Série A	11th	
1996–97	Tier 4	Terceira Divisão	Série A	4th	
1997–98	Tier 4	Terceira Divisão	Série A	10th	
1998–99	Tier 4	Terceira Divisão	Série A	2nd	Promoted
1999–2000	Tier 3	Segunda Divisão	Série Norte	17th	Relegated
2000–01	Tier 4	Terceira Divisão	Série A	2nd	Promoted
2001–02	Tier 3	Segunda Divisão	Série Norte	19th	Relegated
2002–03	Tier 4	Terceira Divisão	Série A	3rd	
2003–04	Tier 4	Terceira Divisão	Série A	3rd	
2004–05	Tier 4	Terceira Divisão	Série A	7th	
2005–06	Tier 4	Terceira Divisão	Série A	4th	
2006–07	Tier 4	Terceira Divisão	Série A	6th	
2007–08	Tier 4	Terceira Divisão	Série A – 1ª Fase	5th	Promotion Group
	Tier 4	Terceira Divisão	Série A Fase Final	4th	
2008–09	Tier 4	Terceira Divisão	Série A – 1ª Fase	3rd	Promotion Group
	Tier 4	Terceira Divisão	Série A Fase Final	5th	
2009–10	Tier 4	Terceira Divisão	Série B – 1ª Fase	1st	Promotion Group
	Tier 4	Terceira Divisão	Série B Fase Final	5th	
2010–11	Tier 4	Terceira Divisão	Série B – 1ª Fase	3rd	Promotion Group
	Tier 4	Terceira Divisão	Série B Fase Final	4th	
2011–12	Tier 4	Terceira Divisão	Série A – 1ª Fase	2nd	Promotion Group
	Tier 4	Terceira Divisão	Série A Fase Final	1st	Promoted

== Honours ==
- Terceira Divisão: 2011–12 (Série A)
