= F.C. Amares =

Portuguese football club

Amares
- Full name: Futebol Clube de Amares
- Founded: 1945
- Ground: Engenheiro José Carlos Macedo; Amares; Portugal
- Capacity: 5,000
- Head Coach: Miguel Magalhães
- League: AF Braga – Pró-Nacional
Home colours

Futebol Clube de Amares (abbreviated as FC Amares) is a Portuguese football club based in Amares in the district of Braga.

== Background ==
FC Amares currently plays in the AF Braga – Pró-Nacional which is the fourth tier of Portuguese football. The club was founded in 1945 and they play their home matches at the Engenheiro José Carlos Macedo in Amares. The stadium is able to accommodate 5,000 spectators.

The club is affiliated to Associação de Futebol de Braga and has competed in the AF Braga Taça. The club has also entered the national cup competition known as Taça de Portugal on occasions.

== Appearances ==
- Liga de Honra: 1

== Season to season ==
Season	Level	Division	Section	Place	Movements
1990–91	Tier 4	Terceira Divisão	Série A	12th	
1991–92	Tier 4	Terceira Divisão	Série A	5th	
1992–93	Tier 4	Terceira Divisão	Série A	1st	Promoted
1993–94	Tier 3	Segunda Divisão	Série Norte	17th	Relegated
1994–95	Tier 4	Terceira Divisão	Série A	11th	
1995–96	Tier 4	Terceira Divisão	Série A	13th	
1996–97	Tier 4	Terceira Divisão	Série A	3rd	
1997–98	Tier 4	Terceira Divisão	Série A	6th	
1998–99	Tier 4	Terceira Divisão	Série A	5th	
1999–2000	Tier 4	Terceira Divisão	Série A	7th	
2000–01	Tier 4	Terceira Divisão	Série A	7th	
2001–02	Tier 4	Terceira Divisão	Série A	14th	
2002–03	Tier 4	Terceira Divisão	Série A	12th	
2003–04	Tier 4	Terceira Divisão	Série A	16th	Relegated
2004–05	Tier 5	Distritais	AF Braga – Honra A	1st	Promoted
2005–06	Tier 4	Terceira Divisão	Série A	5th	
2006–07	Tier 4	Terceira Divisão	Série A	11th	
2007–08	Tier 4	Terceira Divisão	Série A – 1ª Fase	11th	Relegation Group
	Tier 4	Terceira Divisão	Série A – Sub-Série A1	2nd	
2008–09	Tier 4	Terceira Divisão	Série A – 1ª Fase	10th	Relegation Group
	Tier 4	Terceira Divisão	Série A – Sub-Série A2	2nd	
2009–10	Tier 4	Terceira Divisão	Série A – 1ª Fase	10th	Relegation Group
	Tier 4	Terceira Divisão	Série A Últimos	1st	
2010–11	Tier 4	Terceira Divisão	Série A – 1ª Fase	9th	Relegation Group
	Tier 4	Terceira Divisão	Série A Últimos	2nd	
2011–12	Tier 4	Terceira Divisão	Série A – 1ª Fase	10th	Relegation Group
	Tier 4	Terceira Divisão	Série A Últimos	4th	Relegated
2012–13	Tier 5	Distritais	AF Braga – Honra	13th	
2013–14	Tier 5	Distritais	AF Braga – Honra B	1st	Promoted
2014–15	Tier 4	Distritais	AF Braga – Pró-Nacional	5th	
2015–16	Tier 4	Distritais	AF Braga – Pró-Nacional		

== Honours ==
- AF Braga Taça: 2004/05
