= C.D. Beja =

Portuguese football club

- Full name: Clube Desportivo de Beja
- Founded: 1947
- Ground: Complexo Desportivo Fernando Mamede, Beja, Portugal
- Capacity: 4,200
- Manager: Carlos Simão
- League: AF Beja First Division
- 2011–12: 11th

Clube Desportivo de Beja is a Portuguese football club based in Beja, Alentejo. It was founded in 1947. The club's current home stadium is Complexo Desportivo Fernando Mamede which has a capacity of 4,000. The club finished eleventh in the 2011–12 AF Beja First Division.

== Appearances ==
- Tier 2: 1
- Tier 3: 23
- Tier 4: 32

== League and cup history ==
Season	I	II	III	IV	V	Pts.	Pl.	W	L	T	GS	GA	Diff.	Portuguese Cup
1990–91				5 (F)		41 pts	34	16	9	9	53	33	20	-
1991–92				5 (F)		37 pts	34	11	15	8	26	33	−7	-
1992–93				7 (F)		36 pts	34	13	10	11	42	28	14	-
1993–94				5 (F)		42 pts	34	16	10	8	54	34	20	-
1994–95				3 (F)		50 pts	34	21	8	5	64	28	36	-
1995–96			1 (S)			74 pts	34	22	8	4	62	31	31	-
1996–97		'17				37 pts	34	9	10	15	44	55	−11	-

== Current squad ==
Note: Flags indicate national team as defined under FIFA eligibility rules; some limited exceptions apply. Players may hold more than one non-FIFA nationality.

No.	Pos.	Nation	Player
—	GK	POR	Artur Garret
—	GK	POR	João Sousa
—	GK	POR	Miguel Pardal
—	DF	POR	André Teixeira
—	DF	POR	António Barriga
—	DF	POR	Hugo Santana
—	DF	CPV	Jorge Azevedo
—	DF	POR	Luís Caixinha
—	DF	POR	Nelson Teixeira
—	DF	POR	Pedro Crujo
—	MF	FRA	Ayrton Santos
—	MF	POR	Carlos Mendes
—	MF	BRA	Chiquinho

No.	Pos.	Nation	Player
—	MF	POR	Edgar Trincalhetas
—	MF	POR	José Claudio
—	MF	POR	Nuno Semedo
—	MF	POR	Pacheco
—	MF	POR	Paulo Graça
—	FW	POR	Delgado
—	FW	POR	Francisco Ragageles
—	FW	POR	Fábio Pardal
—	FW	CPV	Jorge Monteiro
—	FW	POR	João Silva
—	FW	POR	Ricardo Caveira
—	FW	POR	Ruben Ramos

== Managers ==
- (Portugal) Diamantino Miranda (1995)
