= Clube Caçadores das Taipas =

Portuguese sports club

Caçadores das Taipas
- Full name: Clube Caçadores das Taipas
- Founded: 23 November 1923; 102 years ago
- Ground: Estádio do Montinho, Caldas das Taipas
- Capacity: 5,500
- League: Pró Nacional Série 2 AF Braga
- 2020–21: 5th

Clube Caçadores das Taipas is a Portuguese sports club from Caldas das Taipas, Guimarães.

The men's football team plays in the Braga Football Association Serie 2. They played for many years in the old Terceira Divisão, but had stints on the third tier, the Segunda Divisão B, from 1998 to 2000 and 2001 to 2004. The team again played on the third tier until being relegated from the 2018–19 Campeonato de Portugal. In the same season, they reached the second round of the 2018–19 Taça de Portugal.
