= Sporting Clube de Pombal =

Portuguese sports club

Sporting Clube de Pombal (also known as Sporting de Pombal, SC Pombal or Sp. Pombal) is a Portuguese sports club from Pombal. It was established on 20 October 1922 as the branch number 10 of Sporting Clube de Portugal (Sporting CP). The sports club has 1,200 affiliated paying members (sócios) and is dedicated to the following sports: football (seniors, juniors, youths, beginners, children U-11 and U-12, and schools); camping; swimming; acrobatic gymnastics; and karate.
