= Vieira S.C. =

Portuguese football club

Vieira
- Full name: Vieira Sport Clube
- Founded: 1965
- Ground: Municipal Vieira do Minho, Vieira do Minho, Braga, Portugal
- Capacity: 2,500
- Chairman: (Portugal) Fernando Henriques
- Manager: (Portugal) Roger Bastos
- League: Portuguese Second Division
- 2008–09: Terceira Divisão, 1st (promoted)

Vieira Sport Clube, commonly known as Vieira, is a Portuguese football club based in Vieira do Minho, Braga. Founded in 1965, it currently plays in the third tier Segunda Divisão (North Zone), holding home matches at Municipal de Vieira do Minho, with a capacity of 2,500 seats.
