= Penela Municipal Chamber =

Legislative body of Penela

Coordinates: 40.02986°N 8.38987°W

Penela Municipal Chamber Câmara Municipal de Penela
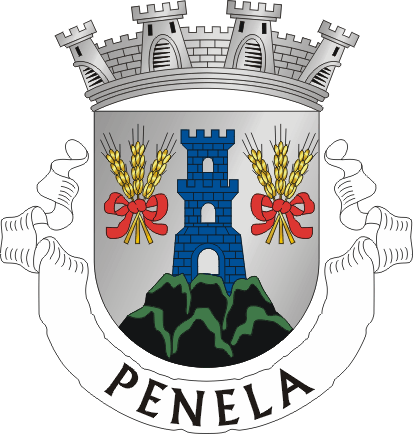
- Coat of arms of the town of Penela

Type
- Type: Câmara municipal
- Term limits: 3

History
- Founded: 1137; 888 years ago

Leadership
- President: Eduardo Jorge Mendes Nogueira dos Santos, PS since 20 October 2021
- Vice President: Luis Manuel Balão Fernandes, PS since 20 October 2021

Structure
- Seats: 5
- Political groups: Municipal Executive (3) PS (3) Opposition (2) PSD (2)
- Length of term: Four years

Elections
- Last election: 26 September 2021
- Next election: Sometime between 22 September and 14 October 2025

Meeting place
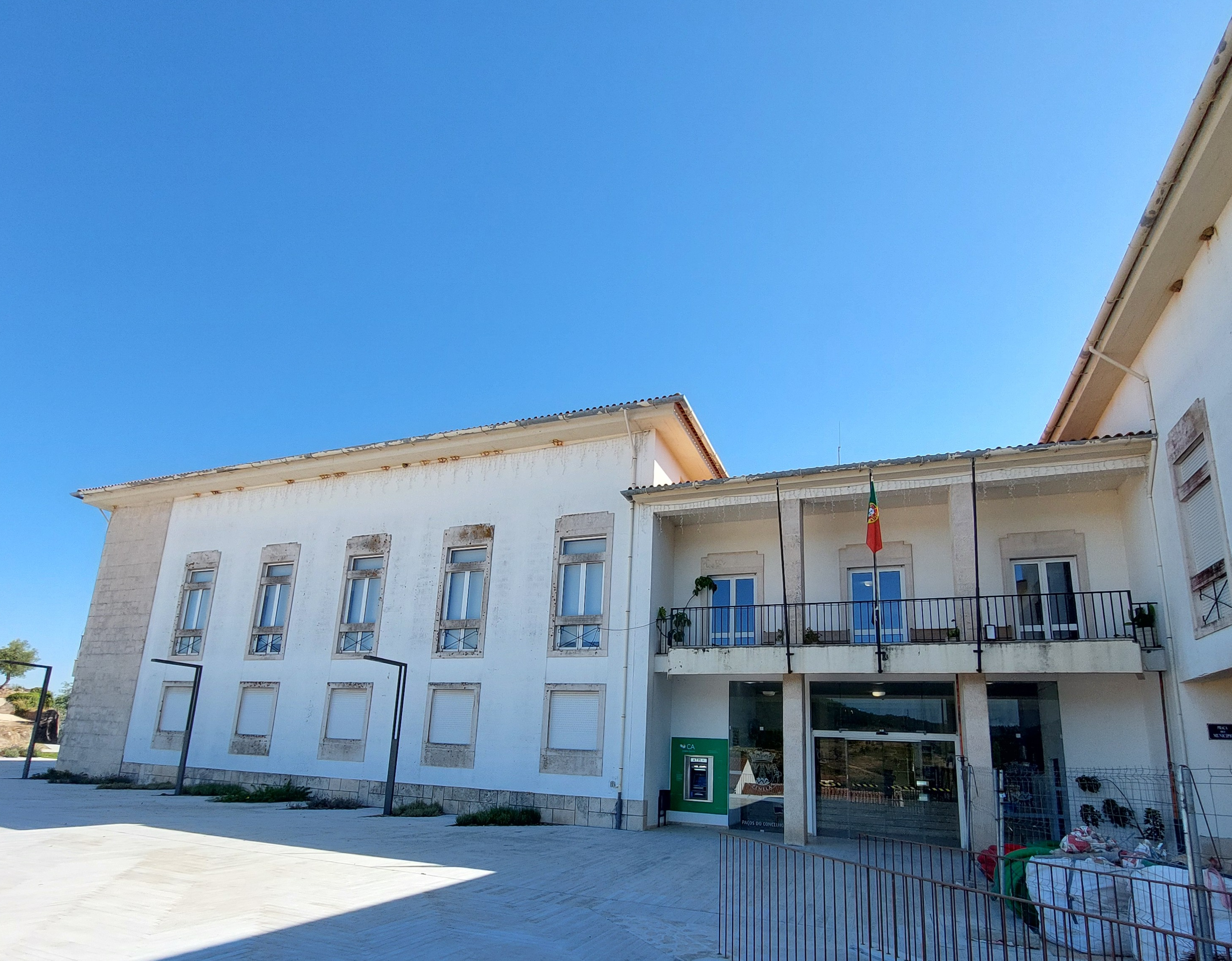
- Paços do Concelho de Penela

Website
- www.cm-penela.pt

The Penela Municipal Chamber (Portuguese: Câmara Municipal de Penela) is the administrative authority in the municipality of Penela. It has 4 freguesias in its area of jurisdiction and is based in the town of Penela, on the Coimbra District. These freguesias are: Cumeeira; Espinhal; Podentes and São Miguel, Santa Eufémia e Rabaçal.

The Penela City Council is made up of 5 councillors, representing, currently, two different political forces. The first candidate on the list with the most votes in a municipal election or, in the event of a vacancy, the next candidate on the list, takes office as President of the Municipal Chamber.

== List of the Presidents of the Municipal Chamber of Penela ==
- António Arnaut – (1974–1976)
- José Coelho Silva – (1976–1979)
- Fernando dos Santos Antunes – (1979–2002)
- Alfredo Mendes Simões – (2002)
- José Carlos Fernandes dos Reis – (2002–2005)
- Paulo Jorge Simões Júlio – (2005–2011)
- António José dos Santos Alves – (2011–2013)
- Luís Filipe Lourenço Matias – (2013–2021)
- Eduardo Jorge Mendes Nogueira dos Santos – (2021–2025)

(The list is incomplete)
