= 1993–94 Campeonato Nacional da 1ª Divisão de Futsal =

Campeonato Nacional da 1ª Divisão de Futsal
- Season: 1993–94
- Dates: 22 September 1993 – 4 June 1994
- Champions: Sporting CP; 3rd title
- Relegated: Real Conchada; Esperança Viva; Beneditense; Santo Tirso
- Matches played: 272
- Goals scored: 1,810 (6.65 per match)

The 1993–94 season of the Liga Portuguesa de Futsal was the 4th season of top-tier futsal in Portugal. The season started on September 22, 1993, and ended on June 4, 1994. Sporting CP won the competition for the third time in total and the second time in a row, making it the first time a team had won back-to-back futsal national championships in Portugal. Santo Tirso withdrew halfway through the season, as such the games the team had played for the league didn't count towards the final standings and every team had a bye in the second half of the season.

== Teams ==
Location of teams in Liga Sport Zone 1993–94
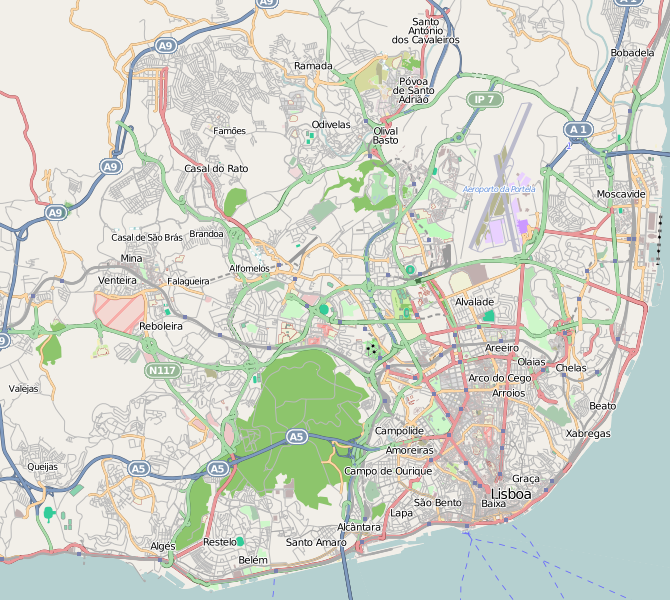
Greater Lisbon teams in Liga Sport Zone 1993–94

Team	Location	Stadium	Capacity
Académica	Coimbra	Pavilhão Eng. Jorge Anjinho	2000
Alhões	Lisbon		
AMSAC	Santo António dos Cavaleiros	Pavilhão da Escola EB 2,3 General Humberto Delgado	1000
Atlético CP	Lisbon	Pavilhão Eng. Santos e Castro	
Beneditense	Benedita	Pavilhão do Externato Cooperativo Benedita	
CAO	Lisbon		
Desportivo Centro	São João da Madeira	Pavilhão da Casa do Povo de Cesar	350
Escolas de Arreigada	Arreigada	Pavilhão Municipal Paços de Ferreira	1200
Esperança Viva	Castelões de Cepeda		
Estrelas de Sassoeiros	Sassoeiros		
Os Indomáveis	Malpique		
Paredes	Paredes	Pavilhão Escola EB 2,3 Paredes	200
Portela	Portela	Pavilhão da Escola EB 2,3 Gaspar Correia	
Real Conchada	Coimbra	Pavilhão Engenheiro Augusto Correia	800
Recordação de Apolo	Lisbon	Pavilhão Januário Barreto	
Santo Tirso	Santo Tirso		
Sporting CP	Lisbon	Nave de Alvalade	1500
Vilaverdense	Vila Verde	Pavilhão Gimnodesportivo Grupo Recreativo Vilaverdense	530

== League table ==
P	Team	Pts	Pld	W	D	L	GF	GA	GD	Qualification or relegation
1	Sporting CP	58	32	28	2	2	156	38	+118	League Champions
2	Atlético CP	52	32	24	4	4	131	54	+77	
3	Recordação de Apolo	51	32	25	1	6	141	68	+73	
4	Estrelas de Sassoeiros	41	32	19	3	10	136	90	+46	
5	AMSAC	40	32	18	4	10	136	89	+47	
6	Alhões	39	32	16	7	9	119	79	+40	
7	Paredes	39	32	17	5	10	120	83	+37	
8	CAO	39	32	16	7	9	105	75	+30	
9	Portela	36	32	17	2	13	129	97	+32	
10	Vilaverdense	29	32	14	1	17	95	94	+1	
11	Escolas de Arreigada	22	32	9	4	19	81	126	-45	
12	Os Indomáveis	21	32	9	3	20	78	149	-71	
13	Desportivo Centro	21	32	10	1	21	79	136	-57	
14	Académica	19	32	8	3	21	67	118	-51	
15	Real Conchada	15	32	5	5	22	75	163	-88	Relegated
16	Esperança Viva	13	32	5	3	24	89	187	-98	Relegated
17	Beneditense	9	32	4	1	27	73	164	-91	Relegated
18	Santo Tirso	–	–	–	–	–	–	–	–	Relegated

== See also ==
- Futsal in Portugal
