= João Campos (footballer) =

Portuguese footballer

Personal information
- Full name: João Miguel Ferreira de Campos
- Date of birth: 19 February 1972 (age 54)
- Place of birth: Coimbra, Portugal
- Height: 1.81 m (5 ft 11 in)
- Position: Midfielder

Youth career
- 1984–1993: Académica

Senior career*
Years	Team	Apps	(Gls)
1993–2003	Académica	97	(1)
1996	→ Naval	7	(0)
1997	→ Sourense	15	(2)
2003–2005	Pombal	50	(1)
- * Club domestic league appearances and goals

João Miguel Ferreira de Campos (born 19 February 1972), shortened to João Campos is a retired Portuguese football midfielder.
