= 2012–13 Terceira Divisão =

Terceira Divisão
- Season: 2012–13

The 2012–13 Terceira Divisão season was the 66th season of the competition and the 23rd season of recognised fourth-tier football in Portugal. It was the last edition of the competition as Campeonato Nacional de Seniores was created in 2013 to replace the Segunda Divisão and Terceira Divisão (third and fourth tier of the Portuguese football league system respectively) for the 2013–14 season.

== Overview ==
The league was contested by 82 teams in 6 divisions of 12 teams, and 1 division of 10 teams. Série Madeira was cut from this year.

Since it was the last year of the competition a large number of clubs needed to be relegated to achieve the 80 clubs that Campeonato Nacional de Seniores has. So the best 2 of each of the Promotion Group and five of the best third's were promoted. In Série Açores, only the top two of the Promotion Group were promoted.

All other were relegated, including all of the teams in the Relegation Group and the worst 3 in the Promotion Group, and including the worst third of the Promotion Group. In Série Açores, it was the worst 2 in the Promotion Group. In total 63 teams were relegated back to the Distritais.

== Terceira Divisão – Série A ==
Série A – Preliminary league table

Pos	Team	Pld	W	D	L	GF	GA	GD	Pts
1	GD Bragança	22	15	4	3	41	14	+27	49
2	Santa Maria FC	22	12	7	3	35	14	+21	43
3	SC Vianense	22	12	6	4	30	15	+15	42
4	Desportivo de Ronfe	22	12	5	5	36	19	+17	41
5	Caçadores das Taipas	22	9	8	5	27	20	+7	35
6	FC Marinhas	22	10	4	8	40	24	+16	34
7	SC Maria da Fonte	22	8	7	7	30	31	−1	31
8	AD Ponte da Barca	22	8	3	11	22	28	−6	27
9	Merelinense F.C.	22	6	5	11	29	35	−6	23
10	SC Melgacense	22	5	5	12	20	55	−35	20
11	AD Esposende	22	3	3	16	20	48	−28	12
12	Desportivo de Monção	22	2	3	17	25	52	−27	9

Terceira Divisão - Série A Promotion Group

Pos	Team	Pld	W	D	L	GF	GA	GD	BP	Pts	Promotion or relegation
1	GD Bragança	10	5	3	2	11	6	+5	25	43	Promotion to Campeonato Nacional de Seniores
2	Santa Maria FC	10	6	2	2	11	6	+5	22	42	Promotion to Campeonato Nacional de Seniores
3	SC Vianense	10	5	3	2	9	4	+5	21	39	Promotion to Campeonato Nacional de Seniores
4	Desportivo de Ronfe	10	3	4	3	12	13	−1	21	34	Relegation to Distritais
5	FC Marinhas	10	2	2	6	11	16	−5	17	25	Relegation to Distritais
6	Caçadores das Taipas	10	1	2	7	8	17	−9	18	23	Relegation to Distritais

Terceira Divisão - Série A Relegation Group

Pos	Team	Pld	W	D	L	GF	GA	GD	BP	Pts	Relegation
1	SC Maria da Fonte	10	6	2	2	27	14	+13	16	36	Relegation to Distritais
2	Merelinense F.C.	10	7	1	2	36	10	+26	12	34	Relegation to Distritais
3	AD Ponte da Barca	10	4	1	5	18	13	+5	14	27	Relegation to Distritais
4	AD Esposende	10	6	2	2	32	12	+20	6	26	Relegation to Distritais
5	Desportivo de Monção	10	3	2	5	22	21	+1	5	16	Relegation to Distritais
6	SC Melgacense	10	0	0	10	2	67	−65	10	10	Relegation to Distritais

== Terceira Divisão – Série B ==
Série B – Preliminary League Table

Pos	Team	Pld	W	D	L	GF	GA	GD	Pts
1	AD Oliveirense	22	14	7	1	30	10	+20	49
2	FC Felgueiras 1932	22	15	3	4	41	19	+22	48
3	U.S.C. Paredes	22	10	8	4	36	17	+19	38
4	FC Pedras Rubras	22	10	5	7	33	31	+2	35
5	A.D. Lousada	22	9	7	6	28	25	+3	34
6	CCD Santa Eulália	22	9	5	8	32	31	+1	32
7	GD Serzedelo	22	7	6	9	21	20	+1	27
8	Aliados Lordelo F.C.	22	6	7	9	22	30	−8	25
9	SC Vila Real	22	7	3	12	27	32	−5	24
10	AC Vila Meã	22	5	7	10	30	47	−17	22
11	Rebordosa AC	22	2	7	13	19	32	−13	13
12	Leça FC	22	2	7	13	16	41	−25	13

Terceira Divisão - Série B Promotion Group

Pos	Team	Pld	W	D	L	GF	GA	GD	BP	Pts	Promotion or relegation
1	FC Felgueiras 1932	10	7	3	0	18	5	+13	24	48	Promotion to Campeonato Nacional de Seniores
2	AD Oliveirense	10	7	1	2	21	9	+12	25	47	Promotion to Campeonato Nacional de Seniores
3	CCD Santa Eulália	10	4	3	3	12	10	+2	16	31	Relegation to Distritais
4	A.D. Lousada	10	3	2	5	11	16	−5	17	28	Relegation to Distritais
5	FC Pedras Rubras	10	1	4	5	7	16	−9	18	25	Relegation to Distritais
6	U.S.C. Paredes	10	1	1	8	9	22	−13	19	23	Relegation to Distritais

Terceira Divisão - Série B Relegation Group

Pos	Team	Pld	W	D	L	GF	GA	GD	BP	Pts	Relegation
1	Aliados Lordelo F.C.	10	7	1	2	18	7	+11	13	35	Relegation to Distritais
2	AC Vila Meã	10	5	3	2	12	7	+5	11	29	Relegation to Distritais
3	GD Serzedelo	10	3	3	4	16	18	−2	14	26	Relegation to Distritais
4	SC Vila Real	10	1	5	4	12	20	−8	12	20	Relegation to Distritais
5	Leça FC	10	3	2	5	16	18	−2	7	18	Relegation to Distritais
6	Rebordosa AC	10	2	4	4	12	16	−4	7	17	Relegation to Distritais

== Terceira Divisão – Série C ==
Série C – Preliminary league table

Pos	Team	Pld	W	D	L	GF	GA	GD	Pts
1	CD Estarreja	22	16	3	3	28	9	+19	51
2	S.C. Salgueiros 08	22	15	3	4	43	19	+24	48
3	AD Grijó	22	12	4	6	38	22	+16	40
4	SC Alba	22	10	6	6	29	21	+8	36
5	Oliveira do Bairro S.C.	22	9	4	9	40	40	0	31
6	SC Penalva Castelo	22	8	7	7	30	27	+3	31
7	C.F. União de Lamas	22	7	10	5	28	25	+3	31
8	AA Avanca	22	7	6	9	32	36	−4	27
9	UD Sampedrense	22	6	7	9	26	29	−3	25
10	GD Parada	22	4	3	15	24	49	−25	15
11	ADRC Aguiar da Beira	22	3	5	14	17	35	−18	14
12	GD Oliveira de Frades	22	2	8	12	27	50	−23	14

Terceira Divisão - Série C Promotion Group

Pos	Team	Pld	W	D	L	GF	GA	GD	BP	Pts	Promotion or relegation
1	AD Grijó	10	7	3	0	13	3	+10	20	44	Promotion to Campeonato Nacional de Seniores
2	S.C. Salgueiros 08	10	4	4	2	16	9	+7	24	40	Promotion to Campeonato Nacional de Seniores
3	CD Estarreja	10	3	2	5	8	14	−6	26	37	Promotion to Campeonato Nacional de Seniores
4	Oliveira do Bairro S.C.	10	4	1	5	16	17	−1	16	29	Relegation to Distritais
5	SC Alba	10	2	3	5	10	13	−3	18	27	Relegation to Distritais
6	SC Penalva Castelo	10	2	3	5	9	16	−7	16	25	Relegation to Distritais

Terceira Divisão - Série C Relegation Group

Pos	Team	Pld	W	D	L	GF	GA	GD	BP	Pts	Relegation
1	AA Avanca	10	7	1	2	23	9	+14	14	36	Relegation to Distritais
2	UD Sampedrense	10	6	1	3	18	17	+1	13	32	Relegation to Distritais
3	C.F. União de Lamas	10	4	2	4	17	12	+5	16	30	Relegation to Distritais
4	GD Parada	10	6	2	2	21	18	+3	8	28	Relegation to Distritais
5	GD Oliveira de Frades	10	3	1	6	20	24	−4	7	17	Relegation to Distritais
6	ADRC Aguiar da Beira	10	0	1	9	8	27	−19	7	8	Relegation to Distritais

== Terceira Divisão – Série D ==
Série D – Preliminary league table

Pos	Team	Pld	W	D	L	GF	GA	GD	Pts
1	Caldas	22	13	6	3	36	18	+18	45
2	GD Sourense	22	12	7	3	34	18	+16	43
3	F.C. Oliveira do Hospital	22	12	6	4	38	21	+17	42
4	SC Pombal	22	11	5	6	38	25	+13	38
5	GD Vitória de Sernache	22	10	4	8	39	25	+14	34
6	AC Alcanenense	22	10	3	9	29	27	+2	33
7	CD Torres Novas	22	8	5	9	29	38	−9	29
8	Marinhense	22	7	5	10	28	37	−9	26
9	CDR Penelense	22	7	4	11	19	34	−15	25
10	Beneditense CD	22	7	3	12	22	32	−10	24
11	Ginásio de Alcobaça	22	4	5	13	23	40	−17	17
12	Mortágua FC	22	3	3	16	20	40	−20	12

Terceira Divisão - Série D Promotion Group

Pos	Team	Pld	W	D	L	GF	GA	GD	BP	Pts	Promotion or relegation
1	GD Sourense	10	4	4	2	11	8	+3	22	38	Promotion to Campeonato Nacional de Seniores
2	AC Alcanenense	10	5	2	3	13	10	+3	17	34	Promotion to Campeonato Nacional de Seniores
3	Caldas	10	3	2	5	10	12	−2	23	34	Promotion to Campeonato Nacional de Seniores
4	GD Vitória de Sernache	10	5	1	4	11	9	+2	17	33	Relegation to Distritais
5	F.C. Oliveira do Hospital	10	3	3	4	11	14	−3	21	33	Relegation to Distritais
6	SC Pombal	10	2	4	4	10	13	−3	19	29	Relegation to Distritais

Terceira Divisão - Série D Relegation Group

Pos	Team	Pld	W	D	L	GF	GA	GD	BP	Pts	Relegation
1	Marinhense	10	6	1	3	24	17	+7	13	32	Relegation to Distritais
2	CD Torres Novas	10	5	1	4	15	21	−6	15	31	Relegation to Distritais
3	CDR Penelense	10	3	2	5	16	18	−2	13	24	Relegation to Distritais
4	Beneditense CD	10	3	2	5	16	22	−6	12	23	Relegation to Distritais
5	Mortágua FC	10	4	3	3	22	20	+2	6	21	Relegation to Distritais
6	Ginásio de Alcobaça	10	3	3	4	18	13	+5	9	21	Relegation to Distritais

== Terceira Divisão – Série E ==
Série E – Preliminary league table

Pos	Team	Pld	W	D	L	GF	GA	GD	Pts
1	SU Sintrense	22	11	7	4	42	19	+23	40
2	G.D. Fabril	22	11	7	4	40	23	+17	40
3	F.C. Barreirense	22	10	6	6	35	33	+2	36
4	Eléctrico F.C.	22	10	6	6	31	16	+15	36
5	SG Sacavenense	22	11	3	8	39	22	+17	36
6	Lourinhanense	22	9	7	6	38	28	+10	34
7	CA Pêro Pinheiro	22	9	7	6	27	27	0	34
8	Real	22	8	6	8	31	24	+7	30
9	Amora F.C.	22	7	5	10	25	34	−9	26
10	UDR Tires	22	6	7	9	25	27	−2	25
11	GD Peniche	22	6	3	13	18	48	−30	21
12	SL Cartaxo	22	1	2	19	13	63	−50	5

Terceira Divisão - Série E Promotion Group

Pos	Team	Pld	W	D	L	GF	GA	GD	BP	Pts	Promotion or relegation
1	Lourinhanense	10	5	5	0	13	7	+6	17	37	Promotion to Campeonato Nacional de Seniores
2	SU Sintrense	10	3	4	3	11	10	+1	20	33	Promotion to Campeonato Nacional de Seniores
3	F.C. Barreirense	10	4	2	4	14	14	0	18	32	Promotion to Campeonato Nacional de Seniores
4	G.D. Fabril	10	3	3	4	10	10	0	20	32	Relegation to Distritais
5	SG Sacavenense	10	1	7	2	9	12	−3	18	28	Relegation to Distritais
6	Eléctrico F.C.	10	1	5	4	9	13	−4	18	26	Relegation to Distritais

Terceira Divisão - Série E Relegation Group

Pos	Team	Pld	W	D	L	GF	GA	GD	BP	Pts	Relegation
1	Amora F.C.	10	6	3	1	20	16	+4	13	34	Relegation to Distritais
2	CA Pêro Pinheiro	10	5	2	3	16	18	−2	17	34	Relegation to Distritais
3	Real	10	6	1	3	32	15	+17	15	34	Relegation to Distritais
4	UDR Tires	10	5	2	3	27	19	+8	13	30	Relegation to Distritais
5	GD Peniche	10	3	0	7	17	20	−3	11	20	Relegation to Distritais
6	SL Cartaxo	10	1	0	9	5	29	−24	3	6	Relegation to Distritais

== Terceira Divisão – Série F ==
Série F – Preliminary league table

Pos	Team	Pld	W	D	L	GF	GA	GD	Pts
1	GUS Montemor	22	15	6	1	48	14	+34	51
2	Moura AC	22	12	9	1	44	13	+31	45
3	Atlético S.C.	22	11	7	4	28	15	+13	40
4	Esperança de Lagos	22	10	9	3	37	21	+16	39
5	Juventude Èvora	22	8	7	7	27	29	−2	31
6	CF Vasco da Gama	22	6	8	8	25	29	−4	26
7	G.D. Sesimbra	22	6	8	8	25	36	−11	26
8	Aljustrelense	22	6	8	8	18	18	0	26
9	Lusitano VRSA	22	5	6	11	22	32	−10	21
10	FC Castrense	22	5	5	12	22	38	−16	20
11	GD Monte do Trigo	22	5	5	12	23	36	−13	20
12	G.D. Lagoa	22	1	6	15	18	56	−38	9

Terceira Divisão - Série F Promotion Group

Pos	Team	Pld	W	D	L	GF	GA	GD	BP	Pts	Promotion or relegation
1	GUS Montemor	10	5	1	4	20	12	+8	26	42	Promotion to Campeonato Nacional de Seniores
2	Esperança de Lagos	10	5	4	1	17	9	+8	20	39	Promotion to Campeonato Nacional de Seniores
3	Moura AC	10	3	4	3	15	13	+2	23	36	Promotion to Campeonato Nacional de Seniores
4	Atlético S.C.	10	3	4	3	16	14	+2	20	33	Relegation to Distritais
5	Juventude Èvora	10	4	4	2	15	15	0	16	32	Relegation to Distritais
6	CF Vasco da Gama	10	1	1	8	7	27	−20	13	17	Relegation to Distritais

Terceira Divisão - Série F Relegation Group

Pos	Team	Pld	W	D	L	GF	GA	GD	BP	Pts	Relegation
1	Aljustrelense	10	6	2	2	15	7	+8	13	33	Relegation to Distritais
2	FC Castrense	10	6	2	2	16	4	+12	10	30	Relegation to Distritais
3	G.D. Sesimbra	10	2	3	5	7	17	−10	13	22	Relegation to Distritais
4	Lusitano VRSA	10	2	4	4	6	13	−7	11	21	Relegation to Distritais
5	GD Monte do Trigo	10	3	1	6	13	17	−4	10	20	Relegation to Distritais
6	G.D. Lagoa	10	3	4	3	11	10	+1	5	18	Relegation to Distritais

== Terceira Divisão – Série Açores ==
Série Açores – Preliminary league table

Pos	Team	Pld	W	D	L	GF	GA	GD	Pts
1	S.C. Praiense	18	16	2	0	39	9	+30	50
2	S.C. Angrense	18	12	4	2	49	13	+36	40
3	SC Ideal	18	11	4	3	40	22	+18	37
4	CD Rabo de Peixe	18	9	5	4	31	19	+12	32
5	Santiago FC	18	9	3	6	21	17	+4	30
6	SC Barreiro	18	6	2	10	23	35	−12	20
7	Prainha FC	18	5	3	10	23	29	−6	18
8	Vitória do Pico	18	2	5	11	11	25	−14	11
9	SC Marítimo	18	3	1	14	19	41	−22	10
10	FC Flamengos	18	1	3	14	15	64	−49	6

Terceira Divisão - Série Açores Promotion Group

Pos	Team	Pld	W	D	L	GF	GA	GD	BP	Pts	Promotion or relegation
1	S.C. Praiense	6	2	1	3	9	10	−1	50	57	Promotion to Campeonato Nacional de Seniores
2	SC Ideal	6	3	2	1	6	5	+1	37	48	Promotion to Campeonato Nacional de Seniores
3	S.C. Angrense	6	2	1	3	7	5	+2	40	47	Relegation to Distritais
4	CD Rabo de Peixe	6	2	2	2	8	10	−2	32	40	Relegation to Distritais

Terceira Divisão - Série Açores Relegation Group

Pos	Team	Pld	W	D	L	GF	GA	GD	BP	Pts	Relegation
1	Santiago FC	10	3	4	3	15	14	+1	30	43	Relegation to Distritais
2	Prainha FC	10	4	4	2	16	14	+2	18	34	Relegation to Distritais
3	SC Barreiro	10	2	6	2	14	14	0	20	32	Relegation to Distritais
4	SC Marítimo	10	5	2	3	16	12	+4	10	27	Relegation to Distritais
5	Vitória do Pico	10	4	2	4	17	13	+4	11	25	Relegation to Distritais
6	FC Flamengos	10	2	2	6	12	23	−11	6	14	Relegation to Distritais
