= Canita (footballer) =

Portuguese footballer

Personal information
- Full name: João Paulo Nunes Capote
- Date of birth: 9 December 1975 (age 50)
- Place of birth: Figueira da Foz, Portugal
- Position: Midfielder

Youth career
- 1986–1991: Cova-Gala
- 1991–1993: Naval

Senior career*
| Years | Team | Apps | (Gls) |
| 1993–1997 | Naval | 81 | (14) |
| 1997 | Feirense | 11 | (0) |
| 1998–2000 | Naval | 64 | (8) |
| 2000–2002 | Pombal | 62 | (8) |
| 2002–2003 | Académico Viseu | 30 | (2) |
| 2003–2004 | Ribeira Brava | 31 | (0) |
| 2004–2005 | Oliveira do Hospital | 13 | (0) |
| 2005–2006 | Mirandense | | |
| 2006 | Sourense | | |
| 2006–2007 | Mirandense | 14 | (2) |
| 2007–2008 | Lousanense | | |
| 2008–2009 | Sourense | 18 | (1) |
| 2009–2011 | Penelense | | |
| 2012–2013 | Moínhos | | |
- * Club domestic league appearances and goals

João Paulo Nunes Capote (born 9 December 1975), nicknamed Canita is a retired Portuguese football midfielder. He played on the Portuguese second tier for Naval.
