= Léo Teixeira =

Portuguese footballer

Personal information
- Full name: Leonardo José Santos Teixeira
- Date of birth: 18 July 1999 (age 27)
- Place of birth: Penela, Portugal
- Height: 1.77 m (5 ft 10 in)
- Position: Winger

Team information
- Current team: Petrolul Ploiești
- Number: 19

Youth career
- 2007–2009: Penelense
- 2009–2010: Porto
- 2010–2014: União de Coimbra
- 2014–2016: Académica
- 2016–2017: Eirense
- 2018: Tondela

Senior career*
Years	Team	Apps	(Gls)
2018–2021	Condeixa	56	(5)
2021–2022	Fafe	26	(3)
2022–2024	Varzim	51	(3)
2024–2026	Felgueiras	55	(6)
2026–	Petrolul Ploiești	15	(1)
- * Club domestic league appearances and goals as of 6 November 2026

Leonardo José Santos Teixeira (born 18 July 1999), commonly known as Léo Teixeira, is a Portuguese professional footballer who plays as a winger for Liga I club Petrolul Ploiești.

== Club career ==
=== Felgueiras ===
Léo Teixeira signed for Felgueiras on 3 July 2024.
