= Cañita =

Cañita may refer to:

- Cañita, Panama
- Cyperus giganteus, sometimes called "cañita"
- Canita (footballer)
