= Pedro Prazeres =

Portuguese footballer

Personal information
- Full name: Pedro Fontainhas Prazeres
- Date of birth: 3 June 1997 (age 29)
- Place of birth: Valença, Portugal
- Height: 1.73 m (5 ft 8 in)
- Position: Forward

Team information
- Current team: Vianense

Youth career
- 2005–2016: Cerveira

Senior career*
Years	Team	Apps	(Gls)
2017–2018	Cerveira	28	(15)
2017–2018	Sanjoanense	11	(2)
2018–2020	Leça	40	(6)
2020–2022	Penafiel	17	(0)
2022–2023	Académica de Coimbra	7	(0)
2023–	Vianense	2	(0)
- * Club domestic league appearances and goals as of 7 March 2021

Pedro Fontainhas Prazeres (born 3 June 1997) is a Portuguese footballer who plays for Vianense as a forward.

== Football career ==
He made his professional debut for Penafiel on 14 September 2020 in the Liga Portugal 2.
