= Nuno Raquete =

Portuguese footballer

Personal information
- Full name: Nuno Miguel Mendes Conceição
- Date of birth: 24 September 1971 (age 55)
- Place of birth: Coimbra, Portugal
- Position: Midfielder

Team information
- Current team: Pampilhosa (manager)

Youth career
- 1982–1989: Académica
- 1989–1990: União Coimbra

Senior career*
Years	Team	Apps	(Gls)
1990–1997	União Coimbra		
1997–1999	Naval	36	(0)
1999–2004	Pombal	160	(5)

Managerial career
- 2005: Pombal
- 2005–2007: Mirandense
- 2007–2008: Penelense
- Anadia
- Gândara
- 2009–2015: Sourense
- 2015–2017: Penelense
- 2017–2018: Pampilhosa
- 2020–2021: Carapinheirense
- 2021–: Pampilhosa
- * Club domestic league appearances and goals

Nuno Miguel Mendes Conceição (born 24 September 1971), nicknamed Nuno Raquete is a retired Portuguese footballer who played as a midfielder in the Portuguese second tier for Naval. He later became a manager.
