= S.C. Marítimo =

Portuguese sports club

- Full name: Sport Clube Marítimo
- Founded: 1957
- Ground: Complexo Desportivo de Santa Cruz da Graciosa, Santa Cruz da Graciosa
- Capacity: 2000
- League: Azores
- 2020–21: 4th

Sport Clube Marítimo, better known as Marítimo Graciosa is a Portuguese sports club from Santa Cruz da Graciosa, Azores.

The men's football team plays in the district league. The team enjoyed spells in the Terceira Divisão in 2005 to 2007 and 2012–13. The team also contested the Taça de Portugal during these years.
