= Beneditense CD =

Portuguese sports club

- Full name: Associação Beneditense de Cultura e Desporto
- Founded: 1962
- Ground: Parque Jogos Fonte da Senhora, Benedita
- Capacity: 4000
- League: I Série B AF Leiría
- 2020–21: 8th

Associação Beneditense de Cultura e Desporto is a Portuguese sports club from Benedita.

The men's football team plays in the AF Leiria I Série B. The club enjoyed stints on the third tier while it was named Segunda Divisão B; from 1994 to 2000 and in 2001–02. The subsequent stint on the fourth tier ended in 2006, in addition to a one-off stint in 2012–13. In the Taça de Portugal, the team reached the fourth round in 2002–03.
