= António Arnaut =

Portuguese politician (1936–2018)

António Arnaut GOL
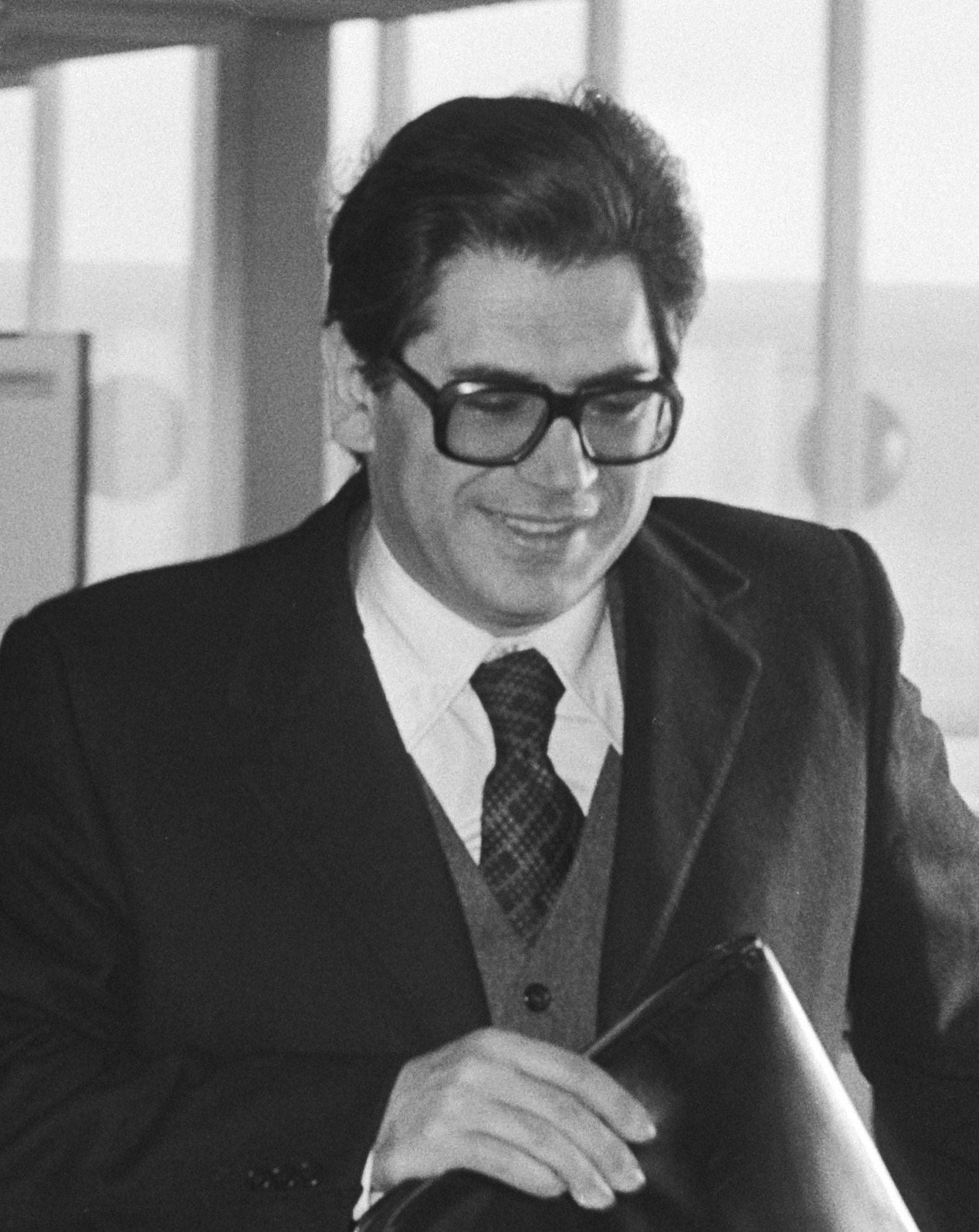
- Arnaut in 1979

Minister of Social Affairs
- In office 30 January 1978 – 29 August 1978
- President: António Ramalho Eanes
- Prime Minister: Mário Soares
- Preceded by: Armando Bacelar
- Succeeded by: Acácio Pereira Magro

Personal details
- Born: António Duarte Arnaut; 28 January 1936 Cumeeira, Portugal
- Died: 21 May 2018 (aged 82) Santo António dos Olivais, Portugal
- Party: Socialist Party
- Education: University of Coimbra
- Occupation: Poet; Fiction writer Essayist; Politician
- Profession: Lawyer

António Duarte Arnaut, GOL (28 January 1936 – 21 May 2018) was a Portuguese poet, fiction writer, essayist, lawyer, and politician. He was Minister of Social Affairs in the II Constitutional Government of Portugal, led by Mário Soares. He is considered the "father" of the Portuguese national health service (SNS - Serviço Nacional de Saúde), having created the first basic health law in Portugal and contributed to universal access to medical care for all Portuguese.

== Life before politics ==
António Arnaut was born in Cumeeira, a small town located in Penela Municipality. He graduated in law from University of Coimbra in 1959.

== Political career ==
In 1973, together with personalities like Mário Soares or Salgado Zenha, he founded the Socialist Party, in Bad Münstereifel, Germany. He was a member of the party board until 1983.

In 1975 he was elected to the Constituent Assembly, which had the task of drafting the new Constitution after the Carnation Revolution. He was also elected to the Assembly of the Republic for several times.

In 1978 he was sworn in as Minister of Social Affairs, and despite being in office for only seven months, he founded the Portuguese National Health Service, which created the first universal health system in Portugal.

Although being retired from active politics, António Arnaut was still an influential voice in the country.

== Other activities ==
He was President of the Portuguese Bar Association council in Coimbra District.

He was a freemason, and was Grand Master of Grande Oriente Lusitano between 2002 and 2005.
