= Viana do Castelo Football Association =

Sport governing body in Portugal

The Viana do Castelo Football Association (Associação de Futebol de Viana do Castelo, frequently shortened to AF Viana do Castelo) is the district governing body for the all football competitions in the Portuguese Viana do Castelo District. It is also the regulator of the clubs registered in the district.

== Notable clubs in the Viana do Castelo FA ==
- Clube Atlético de Valdevez
- SC Vianense
- SC Melgacense
- CD Cerveira
- AD Os Limianos

== Current Divisions - 2025-2026 Season ==
The AF Viana do Castelo runs the following division covering the fourth and fifth tiers of the Portuguese football league system.

=== 1ª Divisão ===
- Annals Football Club
- Barroselas Sports Association
- Campos Sports Association
- Chafé Sports Association
- Anha Sports and Cultural Association
- Fachense Sports and Cultural
- Association Perre Sports and Cultural Association
- Darquense Sports
- Association Paçô Recreational and Cultural Association
- Caminha Athletic Club
- Távora Cultural Recreational Center
- Caçadores Torreenses Club
- Ilustre Caminha
- Football Club Vila Franca
- Lanhelas Football Club
- Sport Valenciano “B”
- Sport Vianense “B”
- Raianos Sports Union

=== 2ª Divisão ===
- Annals Football Club
- Barroselas Sports Association
- Campos Sports Association
- Chafé Sports Association
- Anha Sports and Cultural Association
- Fachense Sports and Cultural
- Association Perre Sports and Cultural Association
- Darquense Sports
- Association Paçô Recreational and Cultural Association
- Caminha Athletic Club
- Távora Cultural Recreational Center
- Caçadores Torreenses Club
- Ilustre Caminha
- Football Club Vila Franca
- Lanhelas Football Club
- Sport Valenciano “B”
- Sport Vianense “B”
- Raianos Sports Union

== See also ==
- Portuguese District Football Associations
- Portuguese football competitions
- List of football clubs in Portugal
