= Castle of Penela =

Castle in Coimbra, Portugal

Coordinates: 40.031°N 8.390°W

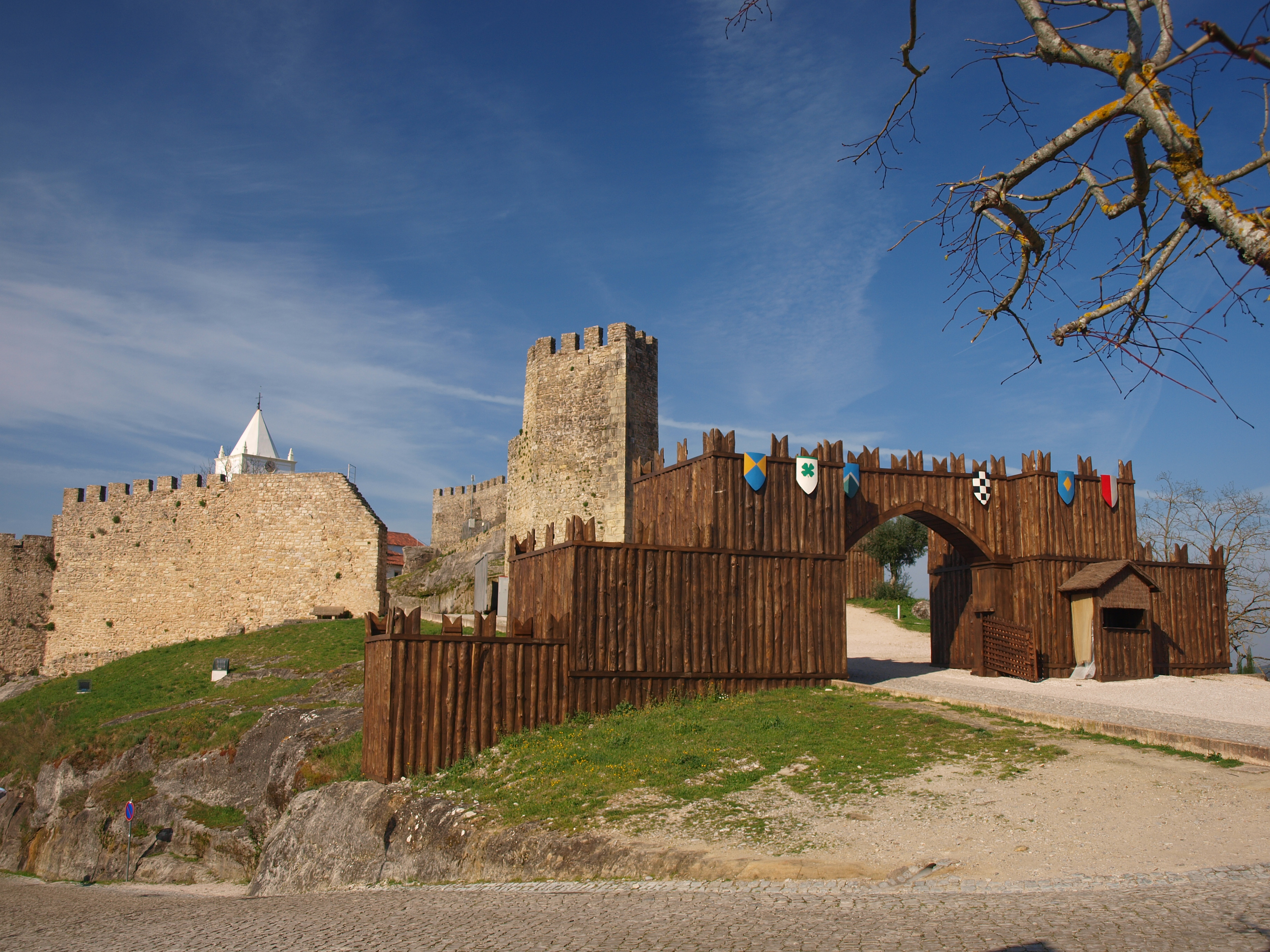
Castle of Penela

Castle of Penela (Portuguese: Castelo de Penela, Portuguese pronunciation: [kɐʃˌtɛlu ðɨ pɨˈnɛlɐ]) is located in a Penela town in Penela Municipality in Coimbra District, Portugal. The castle was built on a hill dominating the area and used to be a stronghold protecting Coimbra in times of Reconquista. Castle of Penela and the neighboring castle Montemor-o-Velho are both fine examples of defensive structures of that period.

The origins of the name are controversial and are attributed by some authors to ancient Celtic tribes. According to a local legend, King Afonso I (Afonso Henriques) exclaimed to incite his troops storming the stronghold: Coragem! Já estamos com o pé nela! (Courage! We have already set a foot in it!). A more plausible hypothesis is, however, that penela is a diminutive of penha, a place selected to build a fortress on.

== History ==
It is believed that the area was already inhabited before the Roman occupation, and later a Roman watchtower was erected to oversee the nearby road connecting Mérida, Conímbriga and Braga. There is, however, no strong evidence to support this hypothesis, as well as any possible fortifications built here in times of Muslim occupation of the Iberian Peninsula.

=== Medieval castle ===
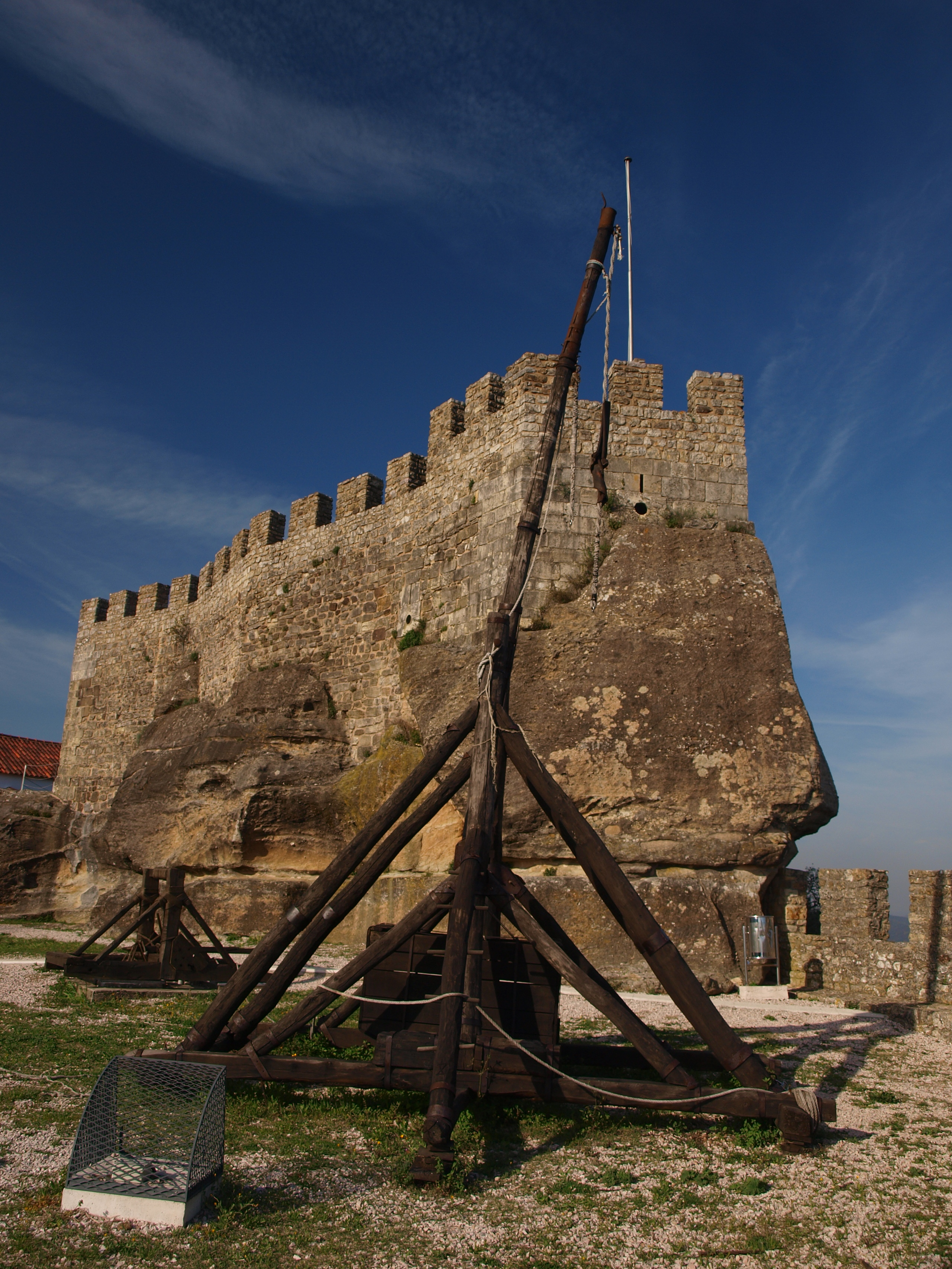
View from inside the walls

Penela's involvement in the Christian Reconquista starts with the conquest of Coimbra region by the troops of Ferdinand I of León (Fernando Magno) in 1064. In the next year the already walled settlement was granted a status of town along with four other nearby villages. The testament of count Sesnando Davides (1087), to whom the king delegated the administration of Conimbricense county, affirms that the count ruled the castle of Penela and the people in the area.

During the successive Muslim offensives in 1116 and 1117 castles Castelo de Miranda do Corvo and Castelo de Santa Eulália were conquered and destroyed, which caused the desertion of castle Castelo de Soure. These castles provided a line of defence for Coimbra region and now castle Penela was threatened. Perhaps this position was also lost, which would explain king Afonso I Henriques assaulting it in 1129, although this version is not supported by any sources. There are documents attributed to the period when a Chart of Foral was granted to the town, which reference a donation of a house inside the castle dated by 1145. This puts in question the assertion that the castle was conquered in 1148, as it is claimed by historian Frei António Brandão (Monarchia Lusitana, 1632), which is also improbable in context of the Conquest of Santarém, and Lisbon since 1147 when the line of Muslim defences was pushed to river Sado.

The castle played an important role in later periods. For instance, Afonso IV of Portugal (1325-1357) was born and died here.

During the 1383–1385 Crisis, the alcaide (commander of the castle) count Viana sided with Castile. Once as he left the castle to seek provisions, he was ambushed at the gates by commoners. As the count fell from the hill he was decapitated by one of the commoners, whom chronicler Fernão Lopes called Caspirre.

Later Pedro duke of Coimbra undertook extensive works in the castle. He ordered a construction of a ducal palace and church São Miguel. Town's gates were rebuilt as well. The town was granted a permission to hold an annual fair (since 1433) on St Michael's Day (September 29).

The castle and town later became a county with Afonso Vasconcelos e Meneses as the 1st count of Penela. Later the ownership of the castle was passed to the House of Aveiro.

=== From the earthquake of 1755 to the present day ===
By the 18th century the castle had lost its defensive value. The earthquake of 1755 destroyed the donjon tower (Clock Tower) and one of the gates. To rebuild the tower in 1760 the stone from the third gate of the castle was used. In the same century after the death of José (1750-1777) the ruling family de Aveiro became extinct.

By the beginning of the 20th century the old castle was abandoned and ruined. This was brought to the public opinion and in 1910 the castle was proclaimed a National Monument. Starting in 1940-s the castle underwent a series of restoration works under the supervision of General Direction of the Buildings and National Monuments.

== Description ==
The castle built on a granite mountain occupies the area of about ½ hectare (1.23 acre). It has a shape of an irregular polygon adapted to terrain. The architecture is a mixture of Romanesque and International Gothic styles. According to studies the construction of the castle had two important periods:

- In the 14th century when a new ring of walls was erected comprising twelve towers, four of which are preserved today.
- In the 15th century when the Clock Tower and castelejo were built being the structural evolution of the old donjon tower.

One of the gates is still preserved: the Gates of Treason or Fields Gates (the northern).

== Gallery ==
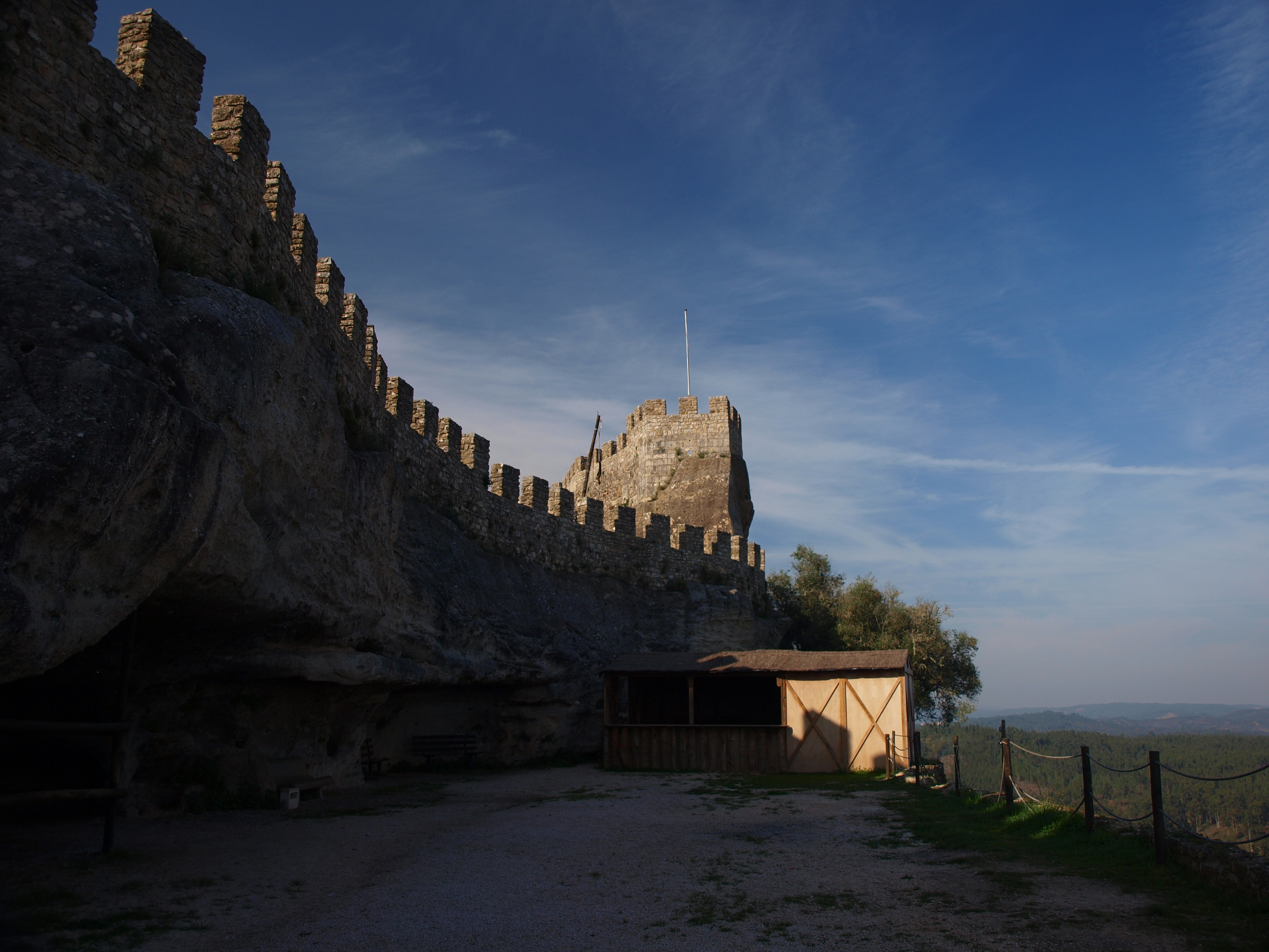
Detail from the walls

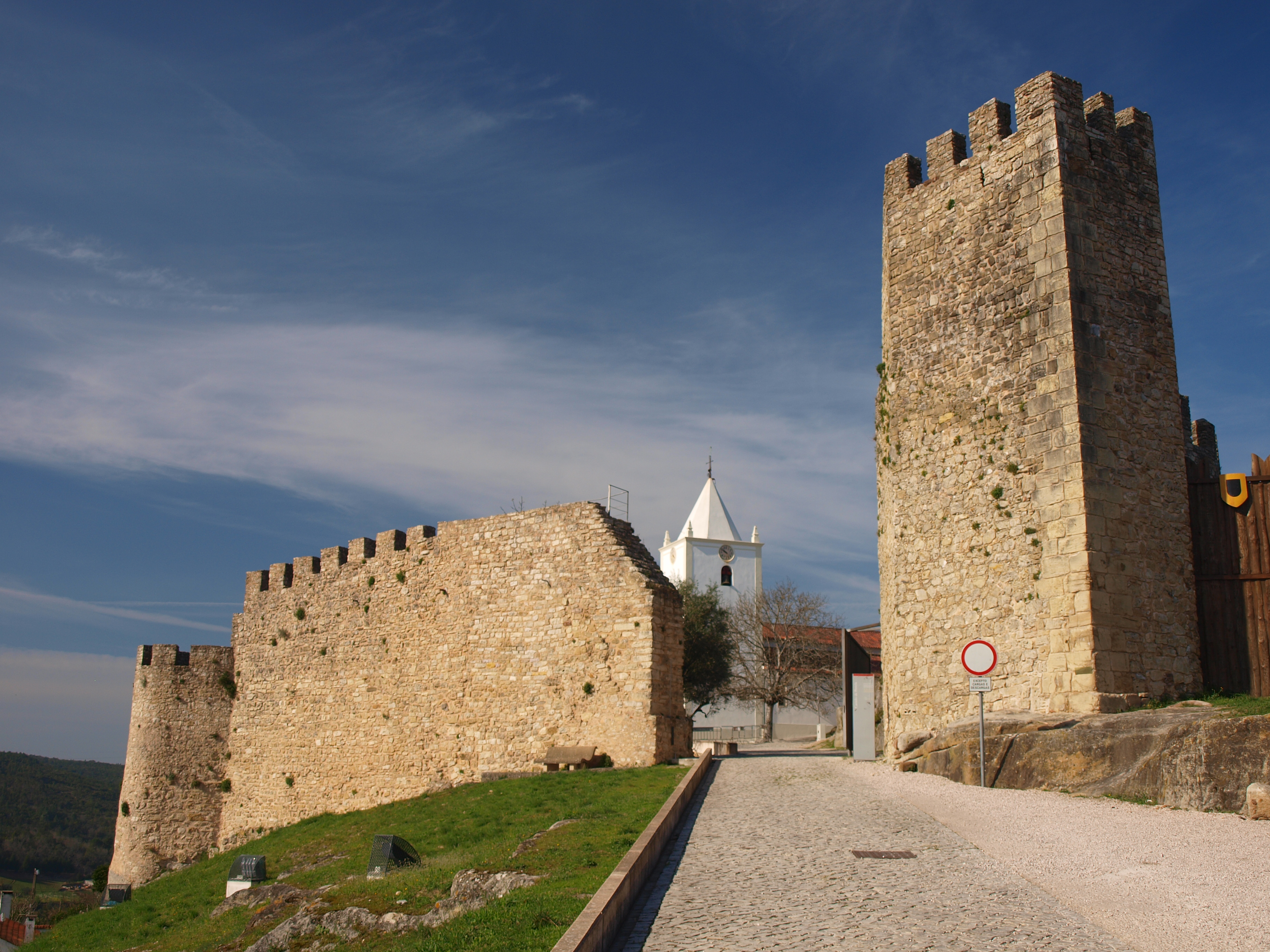
Castle entrance

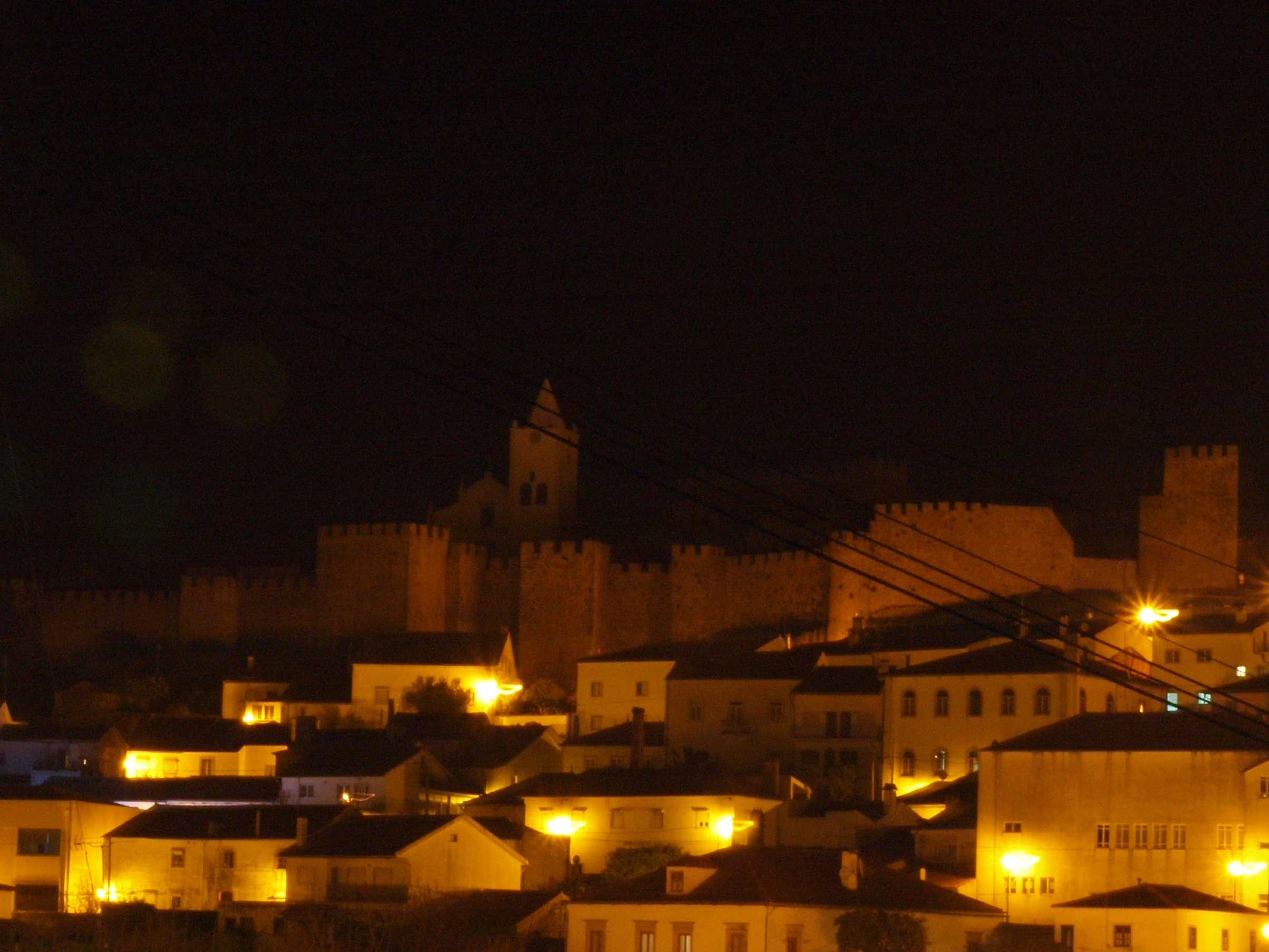
Night view of the castle and village
