= 2005–06 Terceira Divisão =

Terceira Divisão
- Season: 2005–06

The 2005–06 Terceira Divisão season was the 59th season of the competition and the 16th season of recognised fourth-tier football in Portugal.

== Overview ==
The league was contested by 115 teams in 7 divisions of 10 to 18 teams.

== Terceira Divisão – Série A ==
Pos	Team	Pld	W	D	L	GF	GA	GD	Pts	Promotion or relegation
1	GD Bragança	34	22	10	2	65	22	+43	76	Promotion to Segunda Divisão
2	SC Maria da Fonte	34	23	7	4	73	20	+53	76	Promotion to Segunda Divisão
3	SC Mirandela	34	22	7	5	65	29	+36	73	
4	GD Joane	34	18	10	6	51	30	+21	64	
5	FC Amares	34	19	5	10	51	34	+17	62	
6	Brito FC	34	16	9	9	47	37	+10	57	
7	AD Oliveirense	34	14	9	11	54	35	+19	51	
8	Merelinense FC	34	13	10	11	39	35	+4	49	
9	Atlético Cabeceirense	34	14	6	14	49	41	+8	48	
10	CD Cerveira	34	11	12	11	45	45	0	45	
11	SC Vianense	34	11	7	16	34	49	−15	40	
12	Mondinense FC	34	11	5	18	49	64	−15	38	
13	AD Esposende	34	9	10	15	37	51	−14	37	
14	FC Vinhais	34	9	6	19	29	52	−23	33	
15	CD Monção	34	8	7	19	37	55	−18	31	Relegation to Distritais
16	ADC Correlhã	34	7	4	23	34	72	−38	25	Relegation to Distritais
17	SC Valenciano	34	6	6	22	30	71	−41	24	Relegation to Distritais
18	GD Valpaços	34	6	4	24	27	74	−47	22	Relegation to Distritais

== Terceira Divisão – Série B ==
Pos	Team	Pld	W	D	L	GF	GA	GD	Pts	Promotion or relegation
1	AC Vila Meã	32	16	10	6	42	25	+17	58	Promotion to Segunda Divisão
2	Lusitânia Lourosa	32	15	10	7	47	25	+22	55	Promotion to Segunda Divisão
3	GD Torre de Moncorvo	32	15	8	9	45	33	+12	53	
4	Ermesinde FC	32	14	9	9	46	41	+5	51	
5	FC Vilanovense	32	15	4	13	36	46	−10	49	
6	FC Tirsense	32	14	6	12	46	41	+5	48	
7	AD São Pedro da Cova	32	13	8	11	45	38	+7	47	
8	Rebordosa AC	32	11	14	7	55	37	+18	47	
9	Leça FC	32	11	12	9	42	33	+9	45	
10	SC Vila Real	32	12	9	11	41	34	+7	45	
11	CR Ataense	32	12	9	11	42	43	−1	45	
12	Canedo FC	32	10	11	11	37	38	−1	41	
13	UD Valonguense	32	10	9	13	41	52	−11	39	
14	SC Rio Tinto	32	7	12	13	35	46	−11	33	
15	Padroense FC	32	8	7	17	30	39	−9	31	Relegation to Distritais
16	CD Cinfães	32	6	10	16	26	45	−19	28	Relegation to Distritais
17	ADR Tarouquense	32	7	4	21	32	72	−40	25	Relegation to Distritais

== Terceira Divisão – Série C ==
Pos	Team	Pld	W	D	L	GF	GA	GD	Pts	Promotion or relegation
1	União Lamas	34	20	5	9	48	23	+25	65	Promotion to Segunda Divisão
2	AA Avanca	34	18	6	10	56	31	+25	60	Promotion to Segunda Divisão
3	SC São João de Ver	34	16	9	9	50	38	+12	57	
4	RCS Lamas	34	15	10	9	49	38	+11	55	
5	CRC Souropires	34	15	8	11	46	34	+12	53	
6	AD Valecambrense	34	13	13	8	45	39	+6	52	
7	CD Tondela	34	14	10	10	49	37	+12	52	
8	Anadia FC	34	13	11	10	34	33	+1	50	
9	AD Valonguense	34	11	13	10	38	37	+1	46	
10	GD Milheiroense	34	13	7	14	41	46	−5	46	
11	FC Cesarense	34	11	12	11	37	42	−5	45	
12	AD Sátão	34	10	13	11	36	35	+1	43	
13	GD Gafanha	34	10	13	11	39	45	−6	43	
14	UD Tocha	34	10	13	11	33	33	0	43	
15	CD Estarreja	34	8	13	13	33	42	−9	37	Relegation to Distritais
16	AD Fornos de Algodres	34	9	9	16	30	43	−13	36	Relegation to Distritais
17	Os Marialvas	34	7	7	20	29	58	−29	28	Relegation to Distritais
18	CD Arrifanense	34	1	12	21	23	62	−39	15	Relegation to Distritais

== Terceira Divisão – Série D ==
Pos	Team	Pld	W	D	L	GF	GA	GD	Pts	Promotion or relegation
1	Eléctrico FC	32	17	9	6	40	29	+11	60	Promotion to Segunda Divisão
2	CA Mirandense	32	17	7	8	41	26	+15	58	Promotion to Segunda Divisão
3	Caldas SC	32	15	8	9	45	36	+9	53	
4	GD Sourense	32	14	11	7	52	39	+13	53	
5	GDR Monsanto	32	15	5	12	43	34	+9	50	
6	União Idanhense	32	13	8	11	42	30	+12	47	
7	GD Peniche	32	13	7	12	36	38	−2	46	
8	UD Caranguejeira	32	11	12	9	39	35	+4	45	
9	AC Riachense	32	12	9	11	35	36	−1	45	
10	Sertanense FC	32	10	11	11	33	35	−2	41	
11	GC Alcobaça	32	10	11	11	30	26	+4	41	
12	AC Marinhense	32	10	10	12	52	45	+7	40	
13	GDR Bidoeirense	32	10	10	12	36	41	−5	40	
14	Beneditense CD	32	9	8	15	34	41	−7	35	Relegation to Distritais
15	AD Fundão	32	9	7	16	24	37	−13	34	Relegation to Distritais
16	O Vigor da Mocidade	32	7	7	18	25	47	−22	28	Relegation to Distritais
17	CD Amiense	32	6	8	18	26	58	−32	26	Relegation to Distritais

== Terceira Divisão – Série E ==
Pos	Team	Pld	W	D	L	GF	GA	GD	Pts	Promotion or relegation
1	Atlético CP	34	22	5	7	83	31	+52	71	Promotion to Segunda Divisão
2	AD Machico	34	20	8	6	56	33	+23	68	Promotion to Segunda Divisão
3	AD Carregado	34	19	9	6	56	30	+26	66	
4	CSD Câmara de Lobos	34	16	9	9	51	53	−2	57	
5	SU 1º Dezembro	34	16	8	10	52	38	+14	56	
6	Atlético Cacém	34	15	8	11	55	54	+1	53	
7	SU Sintrense	34	16	4	14	50	45	+5	52	
8	O Elvas CAD	34	13	10	11	39	39	0	49	
9	GD Alcochetense	34	12	11	11	39	36	+3	47	
10	CF Caniçal	34	14	5	15	45	46	−1	47	
11	CD Montijo	34	12	8	14	39	38	+1	44	
12	Santana	34	11	11	12	48	40	+8	44	
13	GS Loures	34	12	4	18	49	54	−5	40	
14	GD Vialonga	34	11	6	17	38	52	−14	39	
15	CF Benfica	34	10	7	17	29	41	−12	37	Relegation to Distritais
16	Estrela Ouriquense	34	8	9	17	35	58	−23	33	Relegation to Distritais
17	UD Vilafranquense	34	5	8	21	34	72	−38	23	Relegation to Distritais
18	UDR Tires	34	5	8	21	27	65	−38	23	Relegation to Distritais

== Terceira Divisão – Série F ==
Pos	Team	Pld	W	D	L	GF	GA	GD	Pts	Promotion or relegation
1	Estrela Vendas Novas	32	18	9	5	49	25	+24	63	Promotion to Segunda Divisão
2	UD Messinense	32	16	12	4	49	22	+27	60	Promotion to Segunda Divisão
3	Lusitano Évora	32	17	9	6	48	27	+21	60	
4	AD Oeiras	32	16	8	8	60	34	+26	56	
5	Lusitano VRSA	32	12	13	7	50	43	+7	49	
6	SR Almancilense	32	12	9	11	35	35	0	45	
7	Juventude Évora	32	13	6	13	37	33	+4	45	
8	Amora FC	32	12	7	13	41	40	+1	43	
9	CD Beja	32	12	7	13	39	37	+2	43	
10	GD Beira-Mar de Monte Gordo	32	11	8	13	34	39	−5	41	
11	GD Lagoa	32	10	11	11	39	38	+1	41	
12	FC Ferreiras	32	10	10	12	43	47	−4	40	
13	Vasco da Gama AC Sines	32	10	10	12	30	43	−13	40	
14	Mineiro Aljustrelense	32	11	7	14	36	38	−2	40	
15	GD Sesimbra	32	10	7	15	33	45	−12	37	Relegation to Distritais
16	FC Castrense	32	7	8	17	34	47	−13	29	Relegation to Distritais
17	GD Monte do Trigo	32	3	3	26	18	82	−64	12	Relegation to Distritais

== Terceira Divisão – Série Açores ==
Série Açores – Preliminary League Table

Pos	Team	Pld	W	D	L	GF	GA	GD	Pts
1	SC Lusitânia	18	12	5	1	30	7	+23	41
2	Santiago FC	18	10	6	2	34	15	+19	36
3	SC Angrense	18	8	7	3	25	15	+10	31
4	Marítimo Graciosa	18	6	7	5	25	20	+5	25
5	SC Praiense	18	6	7	5	20	17	+3	25
6	Vitória FC do Pico	18	6	4	8	26	34	−8	22
7	CD Santo António	18	5	6	7	15	17	−2	21
8	GD Velense	18	5	2	11	17	27	−10	17
9	Boavista SC Flores	18	4	3	11	13	39	−26	15
10	CD Rabo de Peixe	18	2	5	11	13	27	−14	11

Série Açores – Promotion Group

Pos	Team	Pld	W	D	L	GF	GA	GD	BP	Pts	Promotion
1	SC Lusitânia	8	5	2	1	14	6	+8	41	58	Promotion to Segunda Divisão
2	Santiago FC	8	6	1	1	17	9	+8	36	55	
3	SC Angrense	8	2	3	3	10	10	0	31	40	
4	SC Praiense	8	1	2	5	4	10	−6	25	30	
5	Marítimo Graciosa	8	1	2	5	5	15	−10	25	30	

Terceira Divisão - Série Açores Relegation Group

Pos	Team	Pld	W	D	L	GF	GA	GD	BP	Pts	Relegation
1	CD Santo António	8	5	1	2	8	5	+3	21	37	
2	Vitória FC do Pico	8	3	3	2	13	9	+4	22	34	
3	GD Velense	8	3	2	3	8	8	0	17	28	
4	CD Rabo de Peixe	8	5	0	3	11	10	+1	11	26	Relegation to Distritais
5	Boavista SC Flores	8	0	2	6	5	13	−8	15	17	Relegation to Distritais
