= C.D. Cerveira =

Portuguese football club

Cerveira
- Full name: Clube Desportivo de Cerveira
- Short name: CDC
- Founded: 1972
- Ground: Estádio Municipal Rafael Pedreira; Vila Nova de Cerveira; Portugal
- Capacity: 2,500
- Chairman: António Fernandes
- League: Terceira Divisão Série A
Home colours

Clube Desportivo de Cerveira (abbreviated as CD Cerveira) is a Portuguese football club based in Vila Nova de Cerveira in the district of Viana do Castelo.

== Background ==
CD Cerveira currently plays in the Terceira Divisão Série A which is the fourth tier of Portuguese football. The club was founded in 1972 and they play their home matches at the Estádio Municipal Rafael Pedreira in Vila Nova de Cerveira. The stadium is able to accommodate 2,500 spectators.

The club is affiliated to Associação de Futebol de Viana do Castelo and has competed in the AF Viana do Castelo Taça. The club has also entered the national cup competition known as Taça de Portugal on occasions.

== Season to season ==
Season	Level	Division	Section	Place	Movements
1990–91	Tier 5	Distritais	AF Viana do Castelo – 1ª Divisão A	9th	
1991–92	Tier 5	Distritais	AF Viana do Castelo – 1ª Divisão A	11th	
1992–93	Tier 5	Distritais	AF Viana do Castelo – 1ª Divisão A	13th	
1993–94	Tier 5	Distritais	AF Viana do Castelo – 1ª Divisão A	6th	
1994–95	Tier 5	Distritais	AF Viana do Castelo – 1ª Divisão A	15th	Relegated
1995–96	Tier 6	Distritais	AF Viana do Castelo – 2ª Divisão	1st	Promoted
1996–97	Tier 5	Distritais	AF Viana do Castelo – Honra	8th	
1997–98	Tier 5	Distritais	AF Viana do Castelo – Honra	7th	
1998–99	Tier 5	Distritais	AF Viana do Castelo – Honra	2nd	
1999–2000	Tier 5	Distritais	AF Viana do Castelo – Honra 1	4th	
2000–01	Tier 5	Distritais	AF Viana do Castelo – Honra	2nd	
2001–02	Tier 5	Distritais	AF Viana do Castelo – Honra	1st	Promoted
2002–03	Tier 4	Terceira Divisão	Série A	14th	
2003–04	Tier 4	Terceira Divisão	Série A	13th	
2004–05	Tier 4	Terceira Divisão	Série A	11th	
2005–06	Tier 4	Terceira Divisão	Série A	10th	
2006–07	Tier 4	Terceira Divisão	Série A	13th	Relegated
2007–08	Tier 5	Distritais	AF Viana do Castelo – Honra	6th	
2008–09	Tier 5	Distritais	AF Viana do Castelo – Honra	9th	
2009–10	Tier 5	Distritais	AF Viana do Castelo – Honra	5th	
2010–11	Tier 5	Distritais	AF Viana do Castelo – Honra	1st	Promoted
2011–12	Tier 4	Terceira Divisão	Série A – 1ª Fase	12th	Relegation Group
	Tier 4	Terceira Divisão	Série A Últimos	5th	Relegated

== League and cup history ==
Season	I	II	III	IV	V/VI	Pts.	Pl.	W	L	T	GS	GA	Diff.	Portuguese Cup
1990–91					9	-	-	-	-	-	-	-	-	-
1991–92					11	-	-	-	-	-	-	-	-	-
1992–93					13	-	-	-	-	-	-	-	-	-
1993–94					6	-	-	-	-	-	-	-	-	-
1994–95					15	-	-	-	-	-	-	-	-	-
1995–96					1 (2)	-	-	-	-	-	-	-	-	-
1996–97					8	-	-	-	-	-	-	-	-	-
1997–98					7	-	-	-	-	-	-	-	-	-
1998–99					2									
1999–2000					4									
2000–01					2									
2001–02					1									
2002–03				14 (A)		38 pts	34	11	5	8	18	45	58	
2003–04				13 (A)										
2004–05				11 (A)										
2005–06				10 (A)										
2006–07				13 (A)										
2007–08					6									
2008–09					9									
2009–10					5									
2010–11					1									
2011–12				12/5 (A)										

== Honours ==
- AF Viana do Castelo Divisão de Honra: 2001/02, 2010/11
- AF Viana do Castelo 1ª Divisão: 1982/83
- AF Viana do Castelo Taça: 2009/10
