= Penela =

- Municipality
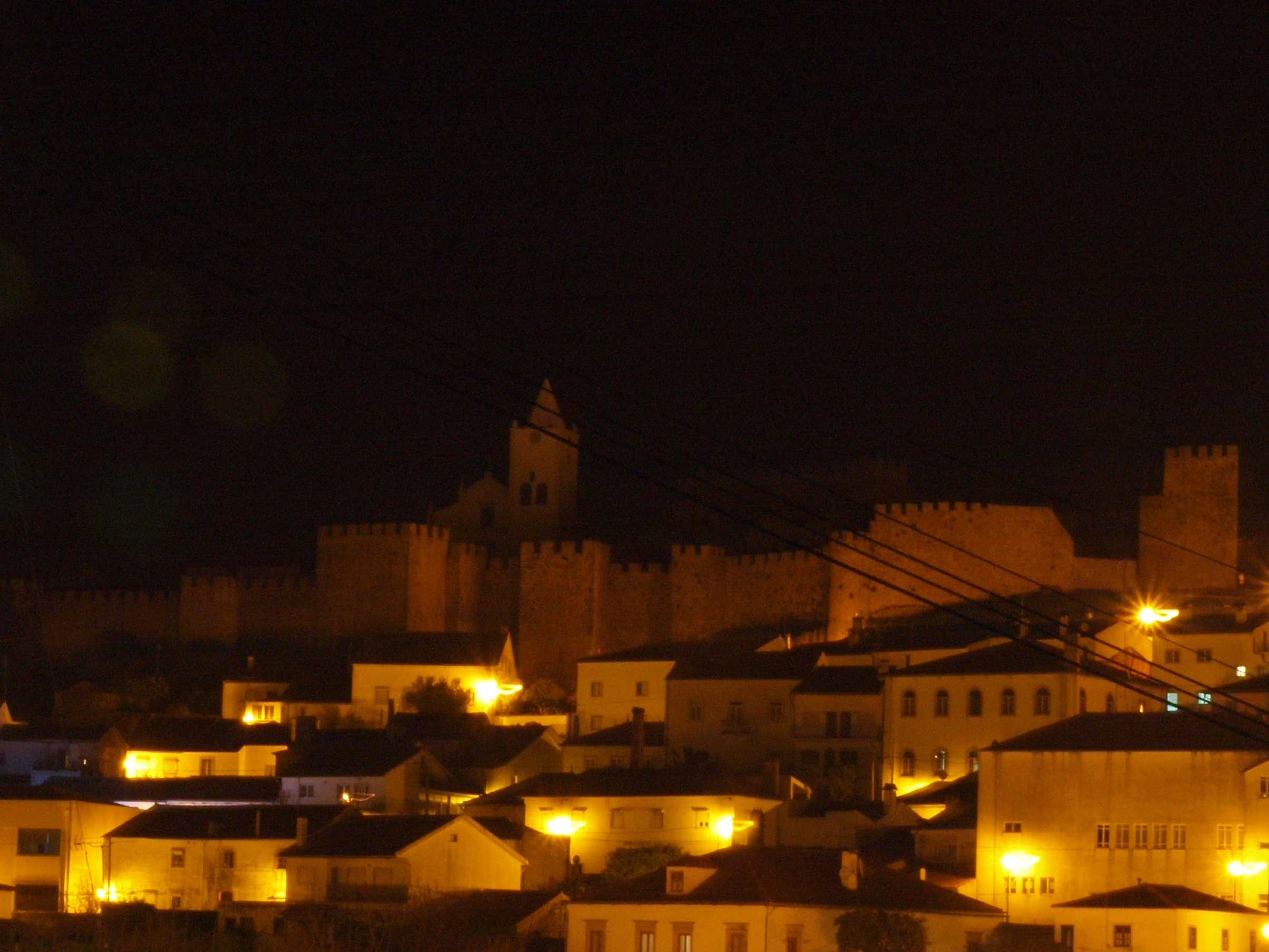
- View of Penela

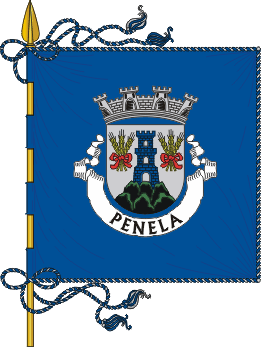
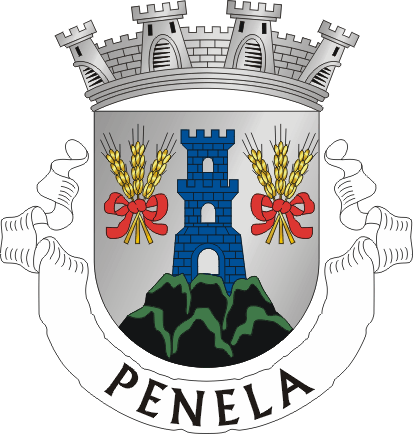
- Flag Coat of arms
- Interactive map of Penela
- Coordinates: 40°02′N 8°23′W
- Country: Portugal
- Region: Centro
- Intermunic. comm.: Região de Coimbra
- District: Coimbra
- Seat: Penela Municipal Chamber
- Parishes: 4

Area
  - Total: 134.80 km^{2} (52.05 sq mi)

Population (2011)
  - Total: 5,983
  - Density: 44.38/km^{2} (115.0/sq mi)
- Time zone: UTC+00:00 (WET)
  - Summer (DST): UTC+01:00 (WEST)
- Website: www.cm-penela.pt

Penela (Portuguese pronunciation: [pɨˈnɛlɐ]) is a municipality located in Coimbra District, in Portugal. It contains the town of Penela with about 3,300 inhabitants. The town's main tourist attraction is the Penela Castle. The population of the municipality in 2011 was 5,983, in an area of 134.80 km^{2}. It is among the oldest recognized municipalities in the whole country (1137).

== Parishes ==
Administratively, the municipality is divided into 4 civil parishes (freguesias):

- Cumeeira
- Espinhal
- Podentes
- São Miguel, Santa Eufémia e Rabaçal (town)

== Notable people ==
- António Arnaut (1936–2018), Portuguese poet, fiction writer, essayist, lawyer, politician and government minister.
- Léo Teixeira (born 1999), Portuguese footballer.
