= S.C. Melgacense =

Portuguese football club

Melgacense
- Full name: Sport Clube Melgacense
- Founded: 1957
- Ground: Centro de Estágios de Melgaço; Melgaço; Portugal
- Capacity: 1,200
- League: Terceira Divisão Série A
Home colours

Sport Clube Melgacense (abbreviated as SC Melgacense) is a Portuguese football club based in Melgaço in the district of Viana do Castelo.

== Background ==
SC Melgacense currently plays in the Terceira Divisão Série A which is the fourth tier of Portuguese football. The club was founded in 1957 and they play their home matches at the Centro de Estágios de Melgaço in Melgaço. The stadium can accommodate 1,200 spectators.

The club is affiliated to Associação de Futebol de Viana do Castelo and has entered the national cup competition known as Taça de Portugal on a few occasions.

== Season to season ==
Season	Level	Division	Section	Place	Movements
1990–91	Tier 6	Distritais	AF Viana do Castelo – 2ª Divisão	5th	
1991–92	Tier 6	Distritais	AF Viana do Castelo – 2ª Divisão	11th	
1992–93	Tier 6	Distritais	AF Viana do Castelo – 2ª Divisão	2nd	Promoted
1993–94	Tier 5	Distritais	AF Viana do Castelo – 1ª Divisão	9th	
1994–95	Tier 5	Distritais	AF Viana do Castelo – 1ª Divisão	9th	
1995–96	Tier 5	Distritais	AF Viana do Castelo – 1ª Divisão	15th	
1996–97	Tier 6	Distritais	AF Viana do Castelo – 1ª Divisão		
1997–98	Tier 6	Distritais	AF Viana do Castelo – 1ª Divisão	5th	
1998–99	Tier 6	Distritais	AF Viana do Castelo – 1ª Divisão	7th	
1999–2000	Tier 6	Distritais	AF Viana do Castelo – 1ª Divisão	2nd	Promoted
2000–01	Tier 5	Distritais	AF Viana do Castelo – Honra	11th	
2001–02	Tier 5	Distritais	AF Viana do Castelo – Honra	5th	
2002–03	Tier 5	Distritais	AF Viana do Castelo – Honra	5th	
2003–04	Tier 5	Distritais	AF Viana do Castelo – Honra	2nd	
2004–05	Tier 5	Distritais	AF Viana do Castelo – Honra	2nd	
2005–06	Tier 5	Distritais	AF Viana do Castelo – Honra	3rd	
2006–07	Tier 5	Distritais	AF Viana do Castelo – Honra	5th	
2007–08	Tier 5	Distritais	AF Viana do Castelo – Honra	7th	
2008–09	Tier 5	Distritais	AF Viana do Castelo – Honra	6th	
2009–10	Tier 5	Distritais	AF Viana do Castelo – Honra	1st	Promoted
2010–11	Tier 4	Terceira Divisão	Série A – 1ª Fase	3rd	Promotion Group
	Tier 4	Terceira Divisão	Série A Fase Final	6th	
2011–12	Tier 4	Terceira Divisão	Série A – 1ª Fase	8th	Relegation Group
	Tier 4	Terceira Divisão	Série A Últimos	3rd	Relegated

== Honours ==
- AF Viana do Castelo 1ª Divisão de Honra: 2009/10
