= Espinhal =

Cumeeira
- Civil parish
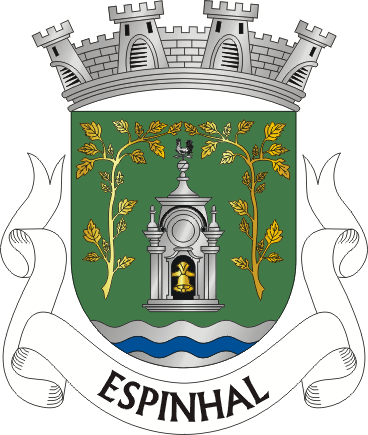
- Coat of arms

- Location in Portugal
- Coordinates: 40.012°N 8.350°W
- Country: Portugal
- Region: Centro
- Intermunic. comm.: Região de Coimbra
- District: Coimbra
- Municipality: Penela

Area
  - Total: 29.38 km^{2} (11.34 sq mi)

Population (2011)
  - Total: 775
  - Density: 26/km^{2} (68/sq mi)
- Time zone: UTC+00:00 (WET)
  - Summer (DST): UTC+01:00 (WEST)

Espinhal is a civil parish in the municipality of Penela, Portugal. The population in 2011 was 775, in an area of 29.38 square kilometres (11.34 sq mi).
