= Benedita, Portugal =

Benedita
- Parish
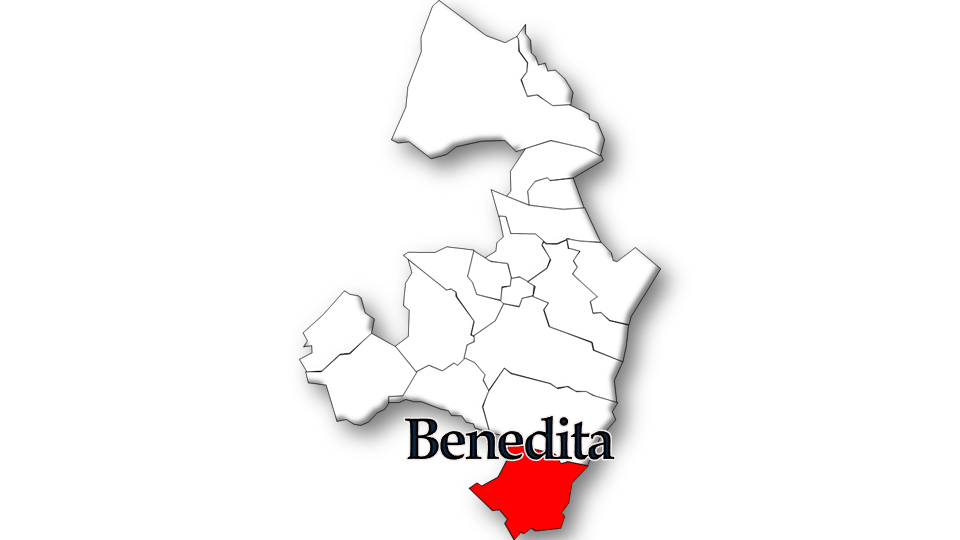
- The parish of Benedita in the municipality of Alcobaça.
- Interactive map of Benedita
- Coordinates: 39°24′21.73″N 8°57′41.57″W
- Country: Portugal
- NUTII: Oeste e Vale do Tejo
- NUTIII: Oeste
- Municipality: Alcobaça

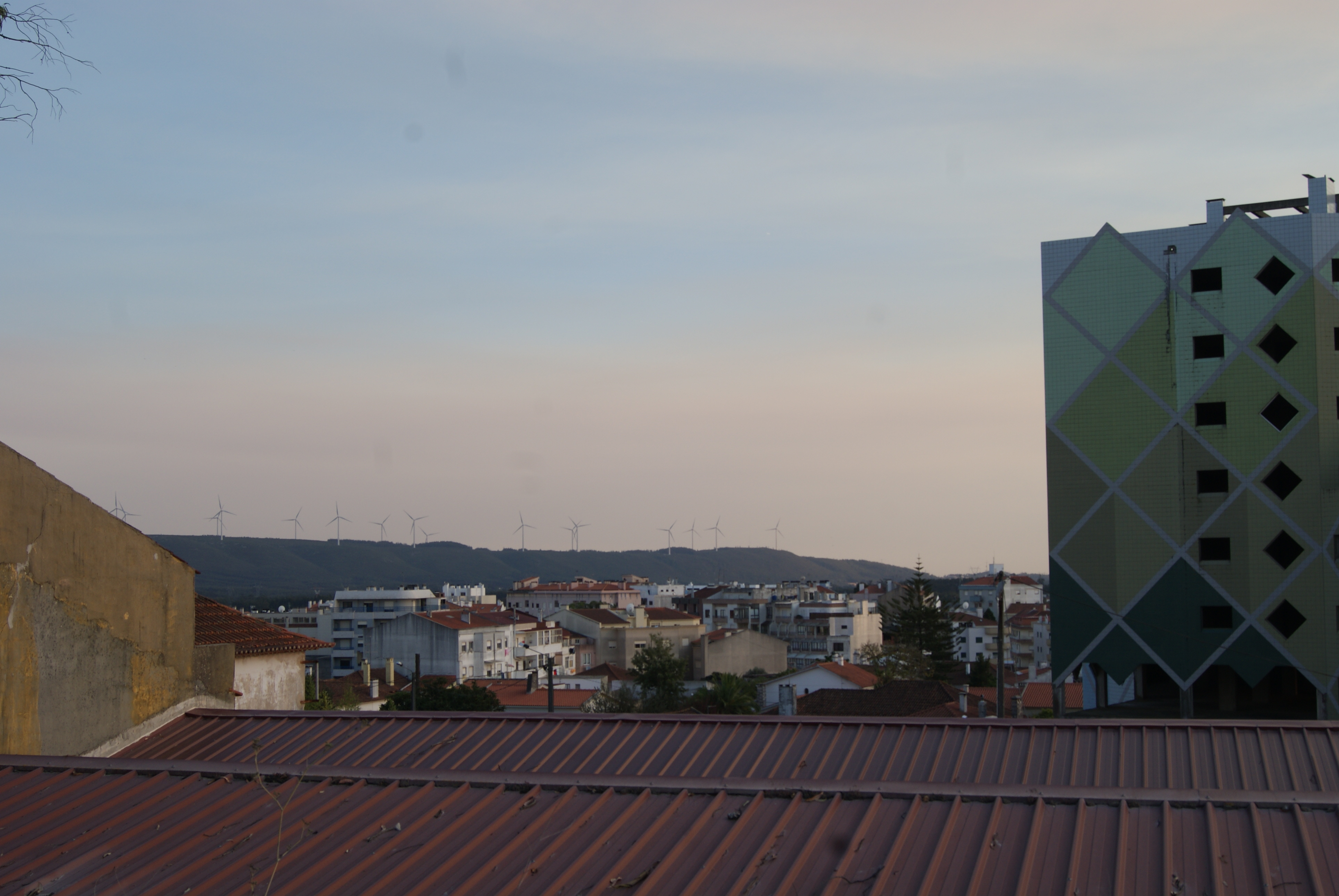

Benedita is a town and parish in the Portuguese municipality of Alcobaça, in the Oeste region. The parish is located on the southern edge of the municipality and covers an area of approximately 30 km². It borders the municipalities of Caldas da Rainha and Rio Maior. It had a population of 8,480 in the 2021 census, making it the most populous parish in the municipality of Alcobaça.

== History ==
Its history is long, beginning in 800 AD. Later, Cistercian monks, an organisation of Christians that were already in the town of Alcobaça, started to search for places to do agriculture and farming. The place of Benedita received town status on May 16, 1984.

== Economy ==
Although a predominantly rural area, the parish of Benedita is heavily industrialised. Its main industries are the shoe making, leather, knife making, stonemasonry industries. Pig farming is also important economically for this parish. The town of Benedita is one of the main commerce centers in the municipality of Alcobaça.

== Nature ==
The eastern section of the parish is covered by the Aire and Candeeiros Ranges Natural Park.
