= Cumeeira =

- Civil parish
- Location in Portugal
- Coordinates: 39.944°N 8.380°W
- Country: Portugal
- Region: Centro
- Intermunic. comm.: Região de Coimbra
- District: Coimbra
- Municipality: Penela

Area
  - Total: 21.29 km^{2} (8.22 sq mi)

Population (2011)
  - Total: 1,072
  - Density: 50/km^{2} (130/sq mi)
- Time zone: UTC+00:00 (WET)
  - Summer (DST): UTC+01:00 (WEST)

Cumeeira is a parish in Penela Municipality, Portugal. The population in 2011 was 1,072, in an area of 21.29 km².
