= G.D. Sourense =

Portuguese association football club

Sourense
- Full name: Grupo Desportivo Sourense
- Nickname: Canarinhos
- Founded: 9 December 1947 (78 years)
- Ground: Campo António Coelho Rodrigues
- Capacity: 1,000
- Chairman: António José Gonçalves
- Manager: Rafael Silva
- League: Campeonato de Portugal
- 2016/17: Coimbra FA, 1st (promoted)

Grupo Desportivo Sourense is a Portuguese football club based in Soure. Founded in 1947, it currently competes in the Coimbra FA Division of Honour, holding home games at Campo António Coelho Rodrigues, with a 1,000 capacity.

== Recent Seasons ==
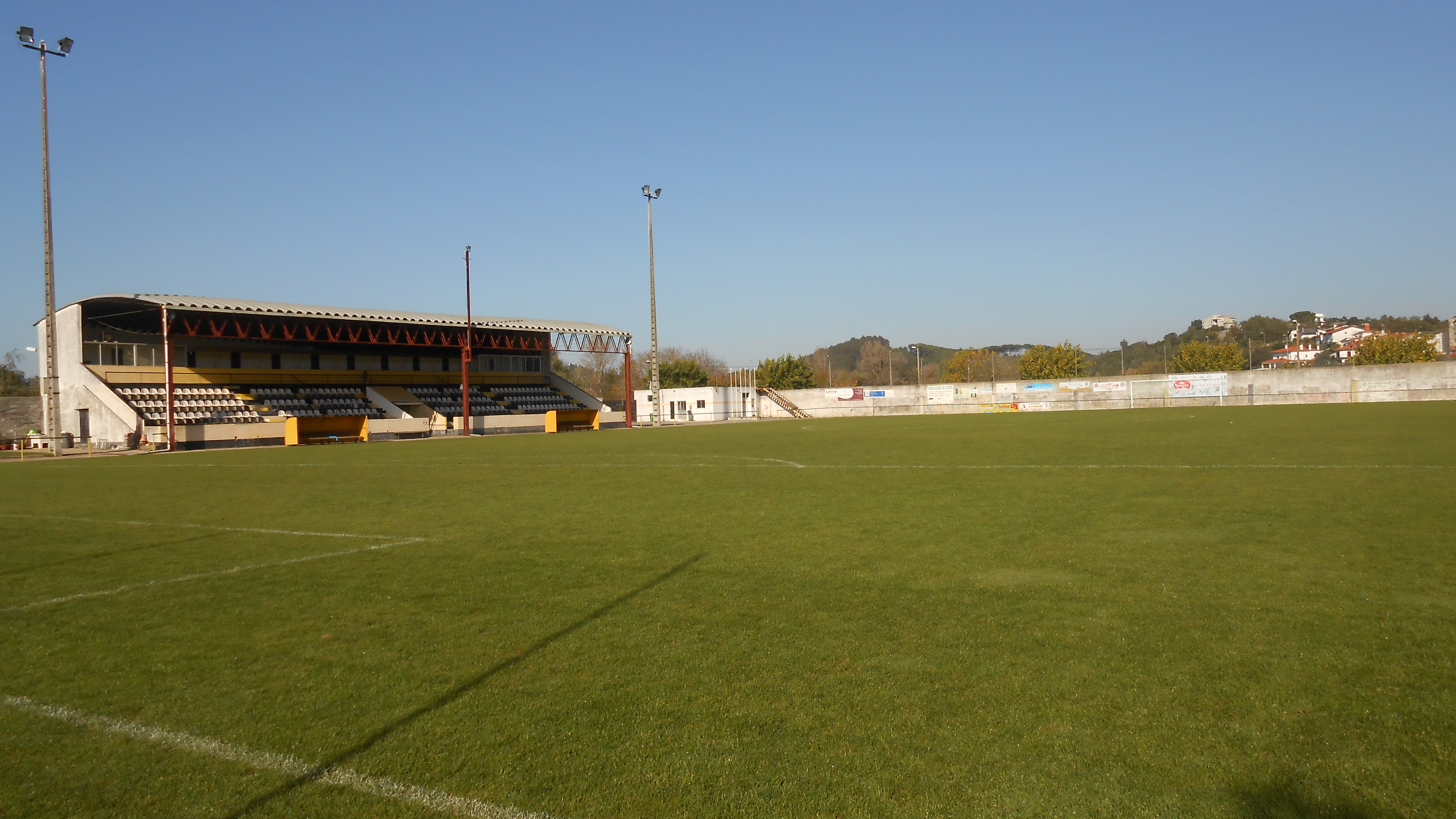
The Campo Dr. António Coelho Rodrigues stadium.

Season	Division	Place	Taça de Portugal	Coimbra FA Cup
2000/01	Terceira Divisão	2nd	Third Round	–
2001/02	Segunda Divisão B	17th	Third Round	–
2002/03	Terceira Divisão	6th	First Round	–
2003/04	Terceira Divisão	5th	Fourth Round	–
2004/05	Terceira Divisão	5th	First Round	–
2005/06	Terceira Divisão	4th	First Round	–
2006/07	Terceira Divisão	6th	Third Round	–
2007/08	Terceira Divisão	6th	Second Round	–
2008/09	Terceira Divisão	9th	Second Round	–
2009/10	Terceira Divisão	5th	First Round	–
2010/11	Terceira Divisão	5th	Second Round	–
2011/12	Terceira Divisão	3rd	Second Round	–
2012/13	Terceira Divisão	1st	Second Round	–
2013/14	Campeonato Nacional de Seniores	4th	Second Round	–
2014/15	Campeonato Nacional de Seniores	10th	Third Round	–
2015/16	Coimbra FA Division of Honour	2nd	–	Quarterfinals
2016/17	Coimbra FA Division of Honour	1st	–	First Round
2017/18	Campeonato de Portugal		First Round	–

== Honours ==
- Terceira Divisão
  - 2012–13
- Coimbra Regional League
  - 1986–87; 1990–91; 2016–17

== Coaches ==
- (Portugal) Paulo Neves (2004–2005)
- (Portugal) José Viterbo (2005–2007)
- (Portugal) Rui Carlos (2007–2008)
- (Portugal) Ricardo Namora (2008–2009)
- (Portugal) Nuno Raquete (2009–2015)
- (Portugal) Rafael Silva (2015–)

== Supporters Groups ==
- Fúria Negra – since 2006
