= C.D.R. Penelense =

Portuguese sports club

CDR Penelense
- Full name: Clube Desportivo Recreativo Penelense
- Founded: 1933
- Ground: Parque Desportivo Municipal São Jorge, Penela
- Capacity: 1000
- League: Honra B AF Coimbra
- 2020–21: 3rd

Clube Desportivo Recreativo Penelense is a Portuguese sports club from Penela.

The men's football team plays in the Honra B AF Coimbra. The team played in the 2012–13 Terceira Divisão and contested the Taça de Portugal the same year.
